= 1995 IAAF World Half Marathon Championships =

- Organisers: IAAF
- Edition: 4th
- Date: October 1
- Venue: Montbéliard to Belfort, Franche-Comté, France
- Events: 2
- Participation: 243 athletes from 54 nations

The 4th IAAF World Half Marathon Championships was held on October 1, 1995, from Montbéliard to Belfort, France. A total of 243 athletes, 147 men and 96 women, from 54 countries took part.

Complete results were published.

== Medallists ==
Event	Gold		Silver		Bronze	
Individual
Men	Moses Tanui (KEN)	1:01:45	Paul Yego (KEN)	1:01:46	Charles Tangus (KEN)	1:01:50
Women	Valentina Yegorova (RUS)	1:09:58	Cristina Pomacu (ROU)	1:10:22	Anuța Cătună (ROU)	1:10:28
Team
Team Men	Kenya	3:05:21	Spain	3:07:51	Italy	3:08:31
Team Women	Romania	3:31:29	Russia	3:33:12	Spain	3:34:26

== Race results ==
=== Men's ===
Rank	Athlete	Nationality	Time	Notes
1st place, gold medalist(s)	Moses Tanui	Kenya	1:01:45	
2nd place, silver medalist(s)	Paul Yego	Kenya	1:01:46	
3rd place, bronze medalist(s)	Charles Tangus	Kenya	1:01:50	
4	Antonio Serrano	Spain	1:01:56	
5	Josiah Thugwane	South Africa	1:02:28	
6	Delmir dos Santos	Brazil	1:02:32	
7	Herder Vázquez	Colombia	1:02:32	
8	Nobuyuki Sato	Japan	1:02:36	
9	Yoshifumi Miyamoto	Japan	1:02:38	
10	Joaquim Pinheiro	Portugal	1:02:40	
11	Bartolomé Serrano	Spain	1:02:41	
12	Vincenzo Modica	Italy	1:02:48	
13	Danilo Goffi	Italy	1:02:49	
14	Oleg Strizhakov	Russia	1:02:54	
15	Giacomo Leone	Italy	1:02:54	
16	Godfrey Muriuki	Kenya	1:02:59	
17	Pasi Mattila	Finland	1:03:01	
18	Muhammed Nazipov	Russia	1:03:02	
19	Pablo Sierra Hermoso	Spain	1:03:14	
20	Philippe Rémond	France	1:03:16	
21	Rainer Wachenbrunner	Germany	1:03:18	
22	Fabián Roncero	Spain	1:03:21	
23	Meck Mothuli	South Africa	1:03:25	
24	André Ramos	Brazil	1:03:26	
25	Masatoshi Ibata	Japan	1:03:30	
26	Vanderlei de Lima	Brazil	1:03:36	
27	Abdi Djama	France	1:03:45	
28	Peter Weilenmann	United States	1:03:47	
29	Dagne Debela	Ethiopia	1:03:48	
30	Luca Barzaghi	Italy	1:03:48	
31	António Rodrigues	Portugal	1:03:56	
32	Focus Willbroad	Tanzania	1:03:57	
33	Bob Kempainen	United States	1:03:58	
34	Klaus-Peter Hansen	Denmark	1:04:00	
35	Andrea Arlati	Italy	1:04:09	
36	Steffen Dittmann	Germany	1:04:11	
37	Takeo Nakahara	Japan	1:04:11	
38	Joseph LeMay	United States	1:04:11	
39	Juan Antonio Crespo	Spain	1:04:12	
40	Lemma Bonsa	Ethiopia	1:04:14	
41	Carsten Jørgensen	Denmark	1:04:21	
42	Valeriy Fedotov	Russia	1:04:24	
43	Sid-Ali Sakhri	Algeria	1:04:26	
44	Martin McLoughlin	Great Britain	1:04:27	
45	Santtu Mäkinen	Finland	1:04:28	
46	Daniel Held	United States	1:04:30	
47	Kidane Gebrmichael	Ethiopia	1:04:35	
48	Daniel Böltz	Switzerland	1:04:38	
49	Bertrand Frechard	France	1:04:39	
50	Aleksey Korobov	Russia	1:04:47	
51	David Taylor	Great Britain	1:04:49	
52	Viktor Chumakov	Belarus	1:04:50	
53	Kaare Sørensen	Denmark	1:04:51	
54	Harri Hänninen	Finland	1:04:52	
55	Mahieddine Belhadj	Algeria	1:04:54	
56	René Godlieb	Netherlands	1:05:04	
57	Sergey Romanchuk	Ukraine	1:05:05	
58	Gerard Kappert	Netherlands	1:05:07	
59	Kingston Maringe	Zimbabwe	1:05:12	
60	Abel Chimukoko	Zimbabwe	1:05:15	
61	Arlindo Macedo	Portugal	1:05:19	
62	Yann Millon	France	1:05:20	
63	Andrés Espinosa	Mexico	1:05:20	
64	Luboš Šubrt	Czech Republic	1:05:21	
65	Motori Choloo	Tanzania	1:05:21	
66	Manuel Matias	Portugal	1:05:23	
67	Roman Kejžar	Slovenia	1:05:25	
68	Pedro Ortíz	Colombia	1:05:28	
69	Viktor Rogovoy	Ukraine	1:05:29	
70	Tolosa Gebre	Ethiopia	1:05:37	
71	Thorsten Naumann	Germany	1:05:43	
72	Ronaldo da Costa	Brazil	1:05:49	
73	Peter van der Velden	Netherlands	1:05:50	
74	Wodage Zvadya	Israel	1:05:51	
75	Igor Šalamun	Slovenia	1:05:53	
76	Ronny Ligneel	Belgium	1:06:04	
77	Marly Sopyev	Turkmenistan	1:06:06	
78	Fernando Couto	Portugal	1:06:13	
79	Marcos Villa	Mexico	1:06:16	
80	Viktor Korniyenko	Ukraine	1:06:31	
81	Aleksandr Kostikov	Russia	1:06:32	
82	Mohamed El-Massoudi	France	1:06:36	
83	Chris Verbeeck	Belgium	1:06:37	
84	Julius Ruto	Kenya	1:06:40	
85	Simon Mphulanyane	South Africa	1:06:47	
86	Marcelo Cascabelo	Argentina	1:06:48	
87	Gezahegn Abera	Ethiopia	1:06:48	
88	Mark Flint	Great Britain	1:06:49	
89	Seiichi Miyajima	Japan	1:06:50	
90	Ronald Schut	Netherlands	1:06:53	
91	Ivo Claes	Belgium	1:06:59	
92	Khelil Benhalima	Algeria	1:07:01	
93	Andrey Kovalenko	Belarus	1:07:05	
94	Mirko Vindiš	Slovenia	1:07:10	
95	Teppo Jalonen	Finland	1:07:13	
96	Tayeb Kalloud	Algeria	1:07:21	
97	Eduardo do Nascimento	Brazil	1:07:26	
98	Bigboy Goromonzi	Zimbabwe	1:07:28	
99	Terje Näss	Norway	1:07:31	
100	Daniel Dasta	Israel	1:07:37	
101	Peter De Vocht	Belgium	1:07:40	
102	Chris Dagg	New Zealand	1:07:41	
103	David Morris	United States	1:07:48	
104	Bashir Hussain	Great Britain	1:08:03	
105	Ebrahim Etta-Ati	Iran	1:08:10	
106	Wilson Theleso	Botswana	1:08:12	
107	Atadjan Duzdyev	Turkmenistan	1:08:15	
108	Haja Ramananjatavo	Madagascar	1:08:25	
109	Ramiz Taipi	FR Yugoslavia	1:08:37	
110	Petri Kuusinen	Finland	1:08:39	
111	Kefemawg Selogilwe	Botswana	1:08:39	
112	Stéphane Schweickhardt	Switzerland	1:08:57	
113	Eike Loch	Germany	1:09:14	
114	Jens Wilky	Germany	1:09:17	
115	Frederick Baldacchino	Malta	1:09:26	
116	Ajay Chuttoo	Mauritius	1:09:29	
117	Linton McKenzie	Jamaica	1:09:37	
118	Parakhat Kurtgeldiyev	Turkmenistan	1:09:50	
119	Aleksey Tarasyuk	Belarus	1:09:59	
120	Geza Grabar	Slovenia	1:10:13	
121	Robert Sádek	Slovakia	1:10:24	
122	Edo Janić	FR Yugoslavia	1:10:38	
123	Nazim Noorbux	Mauritius	1:10:40	
124	Hossein Behdouj	Iran	1:10:44	
125	Prasanna Gamage	Sri Lanka	1:11:31	
126	Rachamim Gasha	Israel	1:11:53	
127	Ali Mohammad Vahed-Puor	Iran	1:11:57	
128	Hossein Fazeli-Sani	Iran	1:12:49	
129	Benjamin Keleketu	Botswana	1:13:19	
130	Lee Kar Lun	Hong Kong	1:13:28	
131	Richard Muscat	Gibraltar	1:13:54	
132	Colin Graham	Jamaica	1:14:09	
133	Binesh Prasad	Fiji	1:15:38	
134	Louis Chichon	Gibraltar	1:15:44	
135	Paul Levick	Gibraltar	1:16:19	
136	Kadri Uka	Albania	1:16:31	
137	Genc Lugja	Albania	1:16:53	
138	Geront Quirici	Albania	1:19:06	
139	Andrew Gutzmore	Jamaica	1:21:43	
140	Edouard Exant	Haiti	1:28:36	
—	Kamal Kohil	Algeria	DNF	
—	Antonio Silio	Argentina	DNF	
—	Heiki Sarapuu	Estonia	DNF	
—	Brian Rushworth	Great Britain	DNF	
—	Pablo Cerón	Mexico	DNF	
—	Baha Tulumbo	Tanzania	DNF	
—	Stevan Stefanović	FR Yugoslavia	DNF	

=== Women's ===
Rank	Athlete	Nationality	Time	Notes
1st place, gold medalist(s)	Valentina Yegorova	Russia	1:09:58	
2nd place, silver medalist(s)	Cristina Pomacu	Romania	1:10:22	
3rd place, bronze medalist(s)	Anuța Cătună	Romania	1:10:28	
4	Colleen de Reuck	South Africa	1:10:34	
5	Alla Zhilyayeva	Russia	1:10:39	
6	Elena Fidatof	Romania	1:10:39	
7	Ana Isabel Alonso	Spain	1:10:43	
8	Zahia Dahmani	France	1:11:28	
9	Maura Viceconte	Italy	1:11:32	
10	Rocío Ríos	Spain	1:11:42	
11	Aurica Buia	Romania	1:11:44	
12	Kamila Gradus	Poland	1:11:45	
13	Marleen Renders	Belgium	1:11:52	
14	Lynn Doering	United States	1:11:54	
15	Carmen Fuentes	Spain	1:12:01	
16	Naomi Sakashita	Japan	1:12:17	
17	Firiya Sultanova-Zhdanova	Russia	1:12:35	
18	Yelena Mazovka	Belarus	1:12:47	
19	María del Carmen Díaz	Mexico	1:12:59	
20	Valentina Enachi	Moldova	1:13:06	
21	Nadia Prasad	France	1:13:06	
22	Mari Yoshikawa	Japan	1:13:07	
23	Anne van Schuppen	Netherlands	1:13:09	
24	Griselda González	Argentina	1:13:11	
25	Franziska Rochat	Switzerland	1:13:16	
26	María Luisa Servín	Mexico	1:13:20	
27	Nicole Lévêque	France	1:13:26	
28	Getenesh Urge	Ethiopia	1:13:26	
29	Ursula Jeitziner	Switzerland	1:13:29	
30	Anne Hare	New Zealand	1:13:29	
31	Gabrielle Vijverberg	Netherlands	1:13:30	
32	Lucilla Andreucci	Italy	1:13:35	
33	Chantal Dällenbach	France	1:14:12	
34	Cath Mijovic	Great Britain	1:14:13	
35	Angie Hulley	Great Britain	1:14:19	
36	Ramilya Burangulova	Russia	1:14:19	
37	Päivi Tikkanen	Finland	1:14:26	
38	Vikki McPherson	Great Britain	1:14:27	
39	Christine Mallo	France	1:14:28	
40	Ornella Ferrara	Italy	1:14:33	
41	Olga Michurina	Russia	1:14:52	
42	Yelena Plastinina	Ukraine	1:14:55	
43	Iglandini González	Colombia	1:14:56	
44	Lizianne Holmes	South Africa	1:14:58	
45	Asha Gigi	Ethiopia	1:15:08	
46	Marianne van de Linde	Netherlands	1:15:25	
47	Andrea Fleischer	Germany	1:15:27	
48	Trudi Thomson	Great Britain	1:15:48	
49	Brynhild Synstnes	Norway	1:15:49	
50	Antonia Andronakiy	Moldova	1:16:11	
51	Danuta Marczyk	Poland	1:16:15	
52	Harue Morishita	Japan	1:16:27	
53	Lisa Dick	Australia	1:16:38	
54	Ágnes Jakab	Hungary	1:16:41	
55	Darlene Mota	United States	1:16:45	
56	Maria Trujillo	United States	1:16:47	
57	Luminita Zaituc	Germany	1:16:49	
58	Kristijna Loonen	Netherlands	1:16:50	
59	Patrizia Ragno	Italy	1:16:54	
60	Jennifer Martin	United States	1:16:55	
61	Asselefech Assefa	Ethiopia	1:17:00	
62	Alla Zadorozhnaya	Belarus	1:17:10	
63	Laurel Park	United States	1:17:29	
64	Grace de Oliveira	South Africa	1:17:39	
65	Rimma Dubovik	Ukraine	1:17:47	
66	Solange de Souza	Brazil	1:17:51	
67	Silvana Pereira	Brazil	1:17:57	
68	Dorota Gruca-Giezek	Poland	1:18:03	
69	Leila Bendahmane	Algeria	1:18:27	
70	Lyubov Klotschko	Ukraine	1:18:30	
71	Leila Aman	Ethiopia	1:18:32	
72	Tatyana Nefedyeva	Belarus	1:18:41	
73	Wendy Llewellyn	New Zealand	1:19:17	
74	Jeļena Prokopčuka/Čelnova	Latvia	1:19:27	
75	Nasria Baghdad	Algeria	1:19:27	
76	Erica Souverein	Netherlands	1:19:28	
77	Siska Maton	Belgium	1:20:15	
78	Kathryn Bailey	Great Britain	1:20:16	
79	Tiziana Alagia	Italy	1:21:19	
80	Petra Guevara	Mexico	1:21:20	
81	Christel Rogiers	Belgium	1:22:37	
82	Tania Taboada	Bolivia	1:22:46	
83	Nemia Coca	Bolivia	1:25:02	
84	Hamida Mazouzi	Algeria	1:25:41	
85	Emi Setoguchi	Japan	1:26:49	
86	Miranda Grecu	Albania	1:35:45	
87	Manushaqe Taku	Albania	1:35:58	
88	Sonila Cekina	Albania	1:39:00	
—	Madina Biktagirova	Belarus	DNF	
—	Rizoneide Vanderley	Brazil	DNF	
—	Gadissie Edato	Ethiopia	DNF	
—	Ann-Catrin Nordman	Finland	DNF	
—	Monika Schäfer	Germany	DNF	
—	Bożena Dziubińska	Poland	DNF	
—	Iulia Olteanu/Negura	Romania	DNF	
—	Paulina Phaho	South Africa	DNF	

== Team Results ==
=== Men's ===
Rank	Country	Team	Time
1st place, gold medalist(s)	Kenya	Moses Tanui; Paul Yego; Charles Tangus	3:05:21
2nd place, silver medalist(s)	Spain	Antonio Serrano; Bartolomé Serrano; Pablo Sierra Hermoso	3:07:51
3rd place, bronze medalist(s)	Italy	Vincenzo Modica; Danilo Goffi; Giacomo Leone	3:08:31
4	Japan	Nobuyuki Sato; Yoshifumi Miyamoto; Masatoshi Ibata	3:08:44
5	Brazil	Delmir dos Santos; André Ramos; Vanderlei de Lima	3:09:34
6	Russia	Oleg Strizhakov; Muhammed Nazipov; Valeriy Fedotov	3:10:20
7	France	Philippe Rémond; Abdi Djama; Bertrand Frechard	3:11:40
8	Portugal	Joaquim Pinheiro; António Rodrigues; Arlindo Macedo	3:11:55
9	United States	Peter Weilenmann; Bob Kempainen; Joseph LeMay	3:11:56
10	Finland	Pasi Mattila; Santtu Mäkinen; Harri Hänninen	3:12:21
11	Ethiopia	Dagne Debela; Lemma Bonsa; Kidane Gebrmichael	3:12:37
12	South Africa	Josiah Thugwane; Meck Mothuli; Simon Mphulanyane	3:12:40
13	Denmark	Klaus-Peter Hansen; Carsten Jørgensen; Kaare Sørensen	3:13:12
14	Germany	Rainer Wachenbrunner; Steffen Dittmann; Thorsten Naumann	3:13:12
15	Netherlands	René Godlieb; Gerard Kappert; Peter van der Velden	3:16:01
16	Great Britain	Martin McLoughlin; David Taylor; Mark Flint	3:16:05
17	Algeria	Sid-Ali Sakhri; Mahieddine Belhadj; Khelil Benhalima	3:16:21
18	Ukraine	Sergey Romanchuk; Viktor Rogovoy; Viktor Korniyenko	3:17:05
19	Zimbabwe	Kingston Maringe; Abel Chimukoko; Bigboy Goromonzi	3:17:55
20	Slovenia	Roman Kejžar; Igor Šalamun; Mirko Vindiš	3:18:28
21	Belgium	Ronny Ligneel; Chris Verbeeck; Ivo Claes	3:19:40
22	Belarus	Viktor Chumakov; Andrey Kovalenko; Aleksey Tarasyuk	3:21:54
23	Turkmenistan	Marly Sopyev; Atadjan Duzdyev; Parakhat Kurtgeldiyev	3:24:11
24	Israel	Wodage Zvadya; Daniel Dasta; Rachamim Gasha	3:25:21
25	Botswana	Wilson Theleso; Kefemawg Selogilwe; Benjamin Keleketu	3:30:10
26	Iran	Ebrahim Etta-Ati; Hossein Behdouj; Ali Mohammad Vahed-Puor	3:30:51
27	Jamaica	Linton McKenzie; Colin Graham; Andrew Gutzmore	3:45:29
28	Gibraltar	Richard Muscat; Louis Chichon; Paul Levick	3:45:57
29	Albania	Kadri Uka; Genc Lugja; Geront Quirici	3:52:30
—	Mexico	Andrés Espinosa; Marcos Villa; Pablo Cerón	DNF
—	Tanzania	Focus Willbroad; Motori Choloo; Baha Tulumbo	DNF
—	FR Yugoslavia	Ramiz Taipi; Edo Janić; Stevan Stefanović	DNF

=== Women's ===
Rank	Country	Team	Time
1st place, gold medalist(s)	Romania	Cristina Pomacu; Anuța Cătună; Elena Fidatof	3:31:29
2nd place, silver medalist(s)	Russia	Valentina Yegorova; Alla Zhilyayeva; Firiya Sultanova-Zhdanova	3:33:12
3rd place, bronze medalist(s)	Spain	Ana Isabel Alonso; Rocío Ríos; Carmen Fuentes	3:34:26
4	France	Zahia Dahmani; Nadia Prasad; Nicole Lévêque	3:38:00
5	Italy	Maura Viceconte; Lucilla Andreucci; Ornella Ferrara	3:39:40
6	Japan	Naomi Sakashita; Mari Yoshikawa; Harue Morishita	3:41:51
7	Netherlands	Anne van Schuppen; Gabrielle Vijverberg; Marianne van de Linde	3:42:04
8	Great Britain	Cath Mijovic; Angie Hulley; Vikki McPherson	3:42:59
9	South Africa	Colleen de Reuck; Lizianne Holmes; Grace de Oliveira	3:43:11
10	United States	Lynn Doering; Darlene Mota; Maria Trujillo	3:45:26
11	Ethiopia	Getenesh Urge; Asha Gigi; Asselefech Assefa	3:45:34
12	Poland	Kamila Gradus; Danuta Marczyk; Dorota Gruca-Giezek	3:46:03
13	Mexico	María del Carmen Díaz; María Luisa Servín; Petra Guevara	3:47:39
14	Belarus	Yelena Mazovka; Alla Zadorozhnaya; Tatyana Nefedyeva	3:48:38
15	Ukraine	Yelena Plastinina; Rimma Dubovik; Lyubov Klotschko	3:51:12
16	Belgium	Marleen Renders; Siska Maton; Christel Rogiers	3:54:44
17	Algeria	Leila Bendahmane; Nasria Baghdad; Hamida Mazouzi	4:03:35
18	Albania	Miranda Grecu; Manushaqe Taku; Sonila Cekina	4:50:43
—	Brazil	Solange de Souza; Silvana Pereira; Rizoneide Vanderley	DNF
—	Germany	Andrea Fleischer; Luminita Zaituc; Monika Schäfer	DNF

== Participation ==
The participation of 243 athletes (147 men/96 women) from 54 countries is reported.

- Albania (6)
- Algeria (8)
- Argentina (3)
- Australia (1)
- Belarus (7)
- Belgium (7)
- Bolivia (2)
- Botswana (3)
- Brazil (8)
- Colombia (3)
- Czech Republic (1)
- Denmark (3)
- Estonia (1)
- Ethiopia (10)
- Fiji (1)
- Finland (7)
- France (10)
- Germany (8)
- Gibraltar (3)
- Haiti (1)
- Hong Kong (1)
- Hungary (1)
- Iran (4)
- Israel (3)
- Italy (10)
- Jamaica (3)
- Japan (9)
- Kenya (5)
- Latvia (1)
- Madagascar (1)
- Malta (1)
- Mauritius (2)
- Mexico (6)
- Moldova (2)
- Netherlands (9)
- New Zealand (3)
- Norway (2)
- Poland (4)
- Portugal (5)
- Romania (5)
- Russia (10)
- South Africa (7)
- Spain (8)
- Slovakia (1)
- Slovenia (4)
- Sri Lanka (1)
- Switzerland (4)
- Tanzania (3)
- Turkmenistan (3)
- Ukraine (6)
- United Kingdom (10)
- United States (10)
- FR Yugoslavia (3)
- Zimbabwe (3)

== See also ==
- 1995 in athletics (track and field)
