= 1996 IAAF World Half Marathon Championships =

- Organisers: IAAF
- Edition: 5th
- Date: September 29
- Host city: Palma de Mallorca, Illes Balears, Spain
- Events: 2
- Participation: 206 athletes from 53 nations

The 5th IAAF World Half Marathon Championships was held on September 29, 1996, in Palma de Mallorca, Spain. A total of 206 athletes, 134 men and 72 women, from 53 countries took part.

Complete results were published.

== Medallists ==
Event	Gold		Silver		Bronze	
Individual
Men	Stefano Baldini (ITA)	1:01:17	Josephat Kiprono (KEN)	1:01:30	Tendai Chimusasa (ZIM)	1:02:00
Women	Ren Xiujuan (CHN)	1:10:39	Lidia Șimon (ROU)	1:10:57	Aurica Buia (ROU)	1:11:01
Team
Team Men	Italy	3:07:42	Spain	3:08:36	Japan	3:08:43
Team Women	Romania	3:32:59	France	3:38:44	Italy	3:41:28

== Race results ==
=== Men's ===
Rank	Athlete	Nationality	Time	Notes
1st place, gold medalist(s)	Stefano Baldini	Italy	1:01:17	
2nd place, silver medalist(s)	Josephat Kiprono	Kenya	1:01:30	
3rd place, bronze medalist(s)	Tendai Chimusasa	Zimbabwe	1:02:00	
4	Carlos de la Torre	Spain	1:02:03	
5	Toshiyuki Hayata	Japan	1:02:05	
6	Neema Tuluway	Tanzania	1:02:30	
7	Delmir dos Santos	Brazil	1:02:44	
8	Alejandro Gómez	Spain	1:02:47	
9	Giacomo Leone	Italy	1:02:48	
10	Stéphane Schweickhardt	Switzerland	1:02:49	
11	Gemechu Kebede	Ethiopia	1:02:52	
12	Masatoshi Ibata	Japan	1:03:07	
13	Lucketz Swartbooi	Namibia	1:03:24	
14	Katsuhiko Hanada	Japan	1:03:31	
15	Ezael Thlobo	South Africa	1:03:32	
16	Philip Chirchir	Kenya	1:03:36	
17	Vincenzo Modica	Italy	1:03:37	
18	Dario Fegatelli	Italy	1:03:38	
19	Kamal Kohil	Algeria	1:03:39	
20	Christopher Isengwe	Tanzania	1:03:43	
21	Paul Arpin	France	1:03:44	
22	Dave Swanston	Great Britain	1:03:44	
23	José Manuel García	Spain	1:03:46	
24	André Ramos	Brazil	1:03:46	
25	Michele Gamba	Italy	1:03:50	
26	John Sence	United States	1:04:07	
27	Dagne Debela	Ethiopia	1:04:13	
28	Charles Tangus	Kenya	1:04:18	
29	Johannes Maremane	South Africa	1:04:20	
30	Margarito Zamora	Mexico	1:04:21	
31	José Manuel Martínez	Spain	1:04:26	
32	Eduardo do Nascimento	Brazil	1:04:35	
33	Pablo Olmedo Castañon	Mexico	1:04:37	
34	Klaus-Peter Hansen	Denmark	1:04:39	
35	Bruno Léger	France	1:04:41	
36	Ronny Ligneel	Belgium	1:04:49	
37	James Herald	United States	1:04:50	
38	Jens Karrass	Germany	1:04:52	
39	Jerry Lawson	United States	1:04:55	
40	Muneyuki Ojima	Japan	1:04:59	
41	Chris Robison	Great Britain	1:05:10	
42	Aleksandr Bolkhovitin	Russia	1:05:12	
43	Kaare Sørensen	Denmark	1:05:15	
44	Abdi Djama	France	1:05:20	
45	Mykola Rudyk	Ukraine	1:05:20	
46	Philip Tanui	Kenya	1:05:22	
47	Luboš Šubrt	Czech Republic	1:05:26	
48	Vladimir Afanasyev	Russia	1:05:37	
49	Geraldo Morales	Mexico	1:05:39	
50	Wodage Zvadya	Israel	1:05:40	
51	Viktor Rogovoy	Ukraine	1:05:46	
52	Herman Decoux	Belgium	1:05:53	
53	Miroslav Sajler	Czech Republic	1:06:05	
54	Andrey Shalagin	Russia	1:06:08	
55	Farid Khayrullin	Russia	1:06:08	
56	Xia Fengyuan	China	1:06:10	
57	Meck Mothuli	South Africa	1:06:12	
58	Aleksandr Kuzin	Ukraine	1:06:18	
59	Dominique Chauvelier	France	1:06:21	
60	Carsten Eich	Germany	1:06:31	
61	Alfredo Vigueras	United States	1:06:35	
62	Phil Makepeace	Great Britain	1:06:36	
63	Zoltán Holba	Hungary	1:06:42	
64	Kidane Gebrmichael	Ethiopia	1:06:46	
65	Apolinar Caudillo	Mexico	1:06:47	
66	Rainer Huth	Germany	1:06:49	
67	Ángel Vizcarrondo	Puerto Rico	1:06:52	
68	Tesfaye Tola	Ethiopia	1:06:59	
69	Asaf Bimro	Israel	1:07:12	
70	Semyon Zhustin	Russia	1:07:15	
71	Ayele Setegne	Israel	1:07:21	
72	Tadayuki Ojima	Japan	1:07:42	
73	Pavel Loskutov	Estonia	1:07:50	
74	Marly Sopyev	Turkmenistan	1:07:50	
75	Josphat Mhandu	Zimbabwe	1:07:55	
76	Carlos Ayala	Mexico	1:07:58	
77	Peter Ndirangu	Kenya	1:08:06	
78	Leonid Pykhteyev	Kyrgyzstan	1:08:13	
79	Peter Weilenmann	United States	1:08:28	
80	Martin Block	Germany	1:08:31	
81	Fungai Kapanyota	Zimbabwe	1:08:38	
82	Dov Kremer	Israel	1:08:40	
83	Ricardo Vera	Uruguay	1:08:48	
84	Aleksandr Saprykin	Kazakhstan	1:08:51	
85	Sujeewa Chandrapala	Sri Lanka	1:08:54	
86	Marcel Matanin	Slovakia	1:08:56	
87	Vladimir Gusev	Kazakhstan	1:09:15	
88	David Tune	Great Britain	1:09:26	
89	Martin Horáček	Czech Republic	1:09:36	
90	Johnny Loría	Costa Rica	1:09:45	
91	Nazirdin Akylbekov	Kyrgyzstan	1:09:53	
92	Jaroslav Jakubáček	Slovakia	1:09:54	
93	Mo Shuxin	China	1:09:56	
94	Miroslav Plešivka	Slovakia	1:10:09	
95	Drago Paripović	Croatia	1:10:34	
96	Josip Lacković	Croatia	1:10:45	
97	Gabriel Laboy	Puerto Rico	1:10:49	
98	Parakhat Kurtgeldiyev	Turkmenistan	1:10:51	
99	Nazim Noorbux	Mauritius	1:11:04	
100	Vladimir Kiselyov	Kyrgyzstan	1:11:17	
101	Bhairon Singh Loney	India	1:11:27	
102	Toni Bernadó	Andorra	1:11:40	
103	Nedeljko Ravić	Croatia	1:12:09	
104	Muni Rajappa	India	1:12:21	
105	Khalid Al-Estashi	Yemen	1:13:17	
106	José Luis Ebatela	Equatorial Guinea	1:13:17	
107	Satish Huryl	Mauritius	1:13:28	
108	Marco Ivan Condori	Bolivia	1:13:28	
109	Jean Ntdugou	Gabon	1:14:01	
110	Kostas Konstantinou	Cyprus	1:14:15	
111	Michal Kavacký	Slovakia	1:14:34	
112	Loasis Boussougou	Gabon	1:14:37	
113	Soudesh Rajcoomar	Mauritius	1:15:21	
114	Leonard Madinda	Gabon	1:16:33	
115	Redmal Singh	India	1:16:34	
116	Theofilou Vasos	Cyprus	1:16:44	
117	Carles Font	Andorra	1:17:39	
118	Ihab Salama	Palestine	1:18:42	
119	Mohamed Al-Khawlani	Yemen	1:19:33	
120	Xavier Bossa	Andorra	1:22:42	
121	Josep Graells	Andorra	1:22:42	
—	Marcelo Cascabelo	Argentina	DNF	
—	Stéphane Rousseau	Belgium	DNF	
—	Gino Van Geyte	Belgium	DNF	
—	Marco Antonio Condori	Bolivia	DNF	
—	Tomix da Costa	Brazil	DNF	
—	Vanderlei de Lima	Brazil	DNF	
—	Willy Kalombo	Zaire	DNF	
—	Mohamed El-Massoudi	France	DNF	
—	Klaus-Peter Nabein	Germany	DNF	
—	Robert de Vido	Hong Kong	DNF	
—	Sam Molokomme	South Africa	DNF	
—	Bartolomé Serrano	Spain	DNF	
—	Maxmillian Iranqhe	Tanzania	DNF	

=== Women's ===
Rank	Athlete	Nationality	Time	Notes
1st place, gold medalist(s)	Ren Xiujuan	China	1:10:39	
2nd place, silver medalist(s)	Lidia Șimon	Romania	1:10:57	
3rd place, bronze medalist(s)	Aurica Buia	Romania	1:11:01	
4	Nuta Olaru	Romania	1:11:07	
5	Kanako Haginaga	Japan	1:11:18	
6	Christine Mallo	France	1:12:24	
7	Firiya Sultanova	Russia	1:12:34	
8	Heather Turland	Australia	1:12:46	
9	Zahia Dahmani	France	1:12:47	
10	Lucilla Andreucci	Italy	1:12:50	
11	Cristina Pomacu	Romania	1:13:05	
12	Zola Pieterse	South Africa	1:13:19	
13	Getenesh Urge	Ethiopia	1:13:22	
14	Martha Ernstdóttir	Iceland	1:13:27	
15	Muriel Linsolas	France	1:13:33	
16	Annalisa Scurti	Italy	1:13:41	
17	Mayumi Ichikawa	Japan	1:13:42	
18	Alla Zhilyayeva	Russia	1:13:47	
19	Dorota Gruca-Giezek	Poland	1:14:07	
20	Nina Korvryzkina	Ukraine	1:14:28	
21	Teresa Récio	Spain	1:14:32	
22	Tatyana Dzhabrayilova	Ukraine	1:14:45	
23	Bénédicte Molle	France	1:14:52	
24	Sonia Maccioni	Italy	1:14:57	
25	Paola Cabrera	Mexico	1:15:00	
26	María Luisa Lárraga	Spain	1:15:03	
27	Wendy Barrett	United States	1:15:23	
28	Sally Goldsmith	Great Britain	1:15:33	
29	Angelines Rodríguez	Spain	1:15:50	
30	Patrizia Ritondo	Italy	1:16:04	
31	Lorraine Masuoka/Hochella	United States	1:16:05	
32	Magdalena Thorsell	Sweden	1:16:07	
33	Tatyana Belovol	Ukraine	1:16:11	
34	Nicole Whiteford	South Africa	1:16:15	
35	Emebet Abossa	Ethiopia	1:16:16	
36	María Luisa Muñoz	Spain	1:16:29	
37	Sonja Deckers	Belgium	1:16:32	
38	Dörte Köster	Germany	1:16:45	
39	Irina Šafářová	Russia	1:16:48	
40	Katrina Price	United States	1:16:49	
41	Renata Paradowska	Poland	1:16:49	
42	Gadissie Edato	Ethiopia	1:16:53	
43	Natalia Requena	Spain	1:16:54	
44	Danielle Sanderson	Great Britain	1:16:56	
45	Laurel Park	United States	1:17:04	
46	Ilona Barbanova	Ukraine	1:17:29	
47	Hayley Nash	Great Britain	1:17:45	
48	Nelly Glauser	Switzerland	1:18:05	
49	Adriana Fernández	Mexico	1:18:25	
50	Anniek Beckers	Belgium	1:18:51	
51	Tijana Pavičić	Croatia	1:19:22	
52	Chunping Jin	China	1:19:41	
53	Asselefech Assefa	Ethiopia	1:19:45	
54	Lu Jing	China	1:20:00	
55	Danuta Marczyk	Poland	1:20:36	
56	Ingrid Van Giel	Belgium	1:21:53	
57	Eloisa Toral	Mexico	1:21:56	
58	Lizianne Holmes	South Africa	1:21:58	
59	Lynn Doering	United States	1:22:25	
60	Mandy Lo	Hong Kong	1:22:37	
61	Flor Venegas	Chile	1:24:28	
62	Abebe Tola	Ethiopia	1:24:36	
63	Usha Verma	India	1:24:50	
64	Slavica Brčić	Croatia	1:25:10	
65	Shelyi Joseph	India	1:25:36	
66	Rigzen Angmo	India	1:25:37	
—	Anja Jørgensen	Denmark	DNF	
—	Heather Heasman	Great Britain	DNF	
—	Liz McColgan	Great Britain	DNF	
—	Lyudmila Petrova	Russia	DNF	
—	Paulina Phaho	South Africa	DNF	
—	Cristina Burca	Romania	DQ^{†}	

^{†}: Cristina Burca from Romania was initially 8th (1:12:37), but disqualified later. From 2 May 1999, the IAAF imposed a life ban on her.

== Team results ==
=== Men's ===
Rank	Country	Team	Time
1st place, gold medalist(s)	Italy	Stefano Baldini; Giacomo Leone; Vincenzo Modica	3:07:42
2nd place, silver medalist(s)	Spain	Carlos de la Torre; Alejandro Gómez; José Manuel García	3:08:36
3rd place, bronze medalist(s)	Japan	Toshiyuki Hayata; Masatoshi Ibata; Katsuhiko Hanada	3:08:43
4	Kenya	Josephat Kiprono; Philip Chirchir; Charles Tangus	3:09:24
5	Brazil	Delmir dos Santos; André Ramos; Eduardo do Nascimento	3:11:05
6	France	Paul Arpin; Bruno Léger; Abdi Djama	3:13:45
7	Ethiopia	Gemechu Kebede; Dagne Debela; Kidane Gebrmichael	3:13:51
8	United States	John Sence; James Herald; Jerry Lawson	3:13:52
9	South Africa	Ezael Thlobo; Johannes Maremane; Meck Mothuli	3:14:04
10	Mexico	Margarito Zamora; Pablo Olmedo Castañon; Geraldo Morales	3:14:37
11	Great Britain	Dave Swanston; Chris Robison; Phil Makepeace	3:15:30
12	Russia	Aleksandr Bolkhovitin; Vladimir Afanasyev; Andrey Shalagin	3:16:57
13	Ukraine	Mykola Rudyk; Viktor Rogovoy; Aleksandr Kuzin	3:17:24
14	Germany	Jens Karrass; Carsten Eich; Rainer Huth	3:18:12
15	Zimbabwe	Tendai Chimusasa; Josphat Mhandu; Fungai Kapanyota	3:18:33
16	Israel	Wodage Zvadya; Asaf Bimro; Ayele Setegne	3:20:13
17	Czech Republic	Luboš Šubrt; Miroslav Sajler; Martin Horáček	3:21:07
18	Slovakia	Marcel Matanin; Jaroslav Jakubáček; Miroslav Plešivka	3:28:59
19	Kyrgyzstan	Leonid Pykhteyev; Nazirdin Akylbekov; Vladimir Kiselyov	3:29:23
20	Croatia	Drago Paripović; Josip Lacković; Nedeljko Ravić	3:33:28
21	Mauritius	Nazim Noorbux; Satish Huryl; Soudesh Rajcoomar	3:39:53
22	India	Bhairon Singh Loney; Muni Rajappa; Redmal Singh	3:40:22
23	Gabon	Jean Ntdugou; Loasis Boussougou; Leonard Madinda	3:45:11
24	Andorra	Toni Bernadó; Carles Font; Xavier Bossa	3:52:01
—	Belgium	Ronny Ligneel; Herman Decoux; Stéphane Rousseau	DNF
—	Tanzania	Neema Tuluway; Christopher Isengwe; Maxmillian Iranqhe	DNF

=== Women's ===
Rank	Country	Team	Time
1st place, gold medalist(s)	Romania	Lidia Șimon; Aurica Buia; Nuta Olaru	3:33:05
2nd place, silver medalist(s)	France	Christine Mallo; Zahia Dahmani; Muriel Linsolas	3:38:44
3rd place, bronze medalist(s)	Italy	Lucilla Andreucci; Annalisa Scurti; Sonia Maccioni	3:41:28
4	Russia	Firiya Sultanova; Alla Zhilyayeva; Irina Šafářová	3:43:09
5	Ukraine	Nina Korvryzkina; Tatyana Dzhabrayilova; Tatyana Belovol	3:45:24
6	Spain	Teresa Récio; María Luisa Lárraga; Angelines Rodríguez	3:45:25
7	Ethiopia	Getenesh Urge; Emebet Abossa; Gadissie Edato	3:46:31
8	United States	Wendy Barrett; Lorraine Masuoka/Hochella; Katrina Price	3:48:17
9	Great Britain	Sally Goldsmith; Danielle Sanderson; Hayley Nash	3:50:14
10	China	Ren Xiujuan; Chunping Jin; Lu Jing	3:50:20
11	Poland	Dorota Gruca-Giezek; Renata Paradowska; Danuta Marczyk	3:51:32
12	South Africa	Zola Pieterse; Nicole Whiteford; Lizianne Holmes	3:51:32
13	Mexico	Paola Cabrera; Adriana Fernández; Eloisa Toral	3:55:21
14	Belgium	Sonja Deckers; Anniek Beckers; Ingrid Van Giel	3:57:16
15	India	Usha Verma; Shelyi Joseph; Rigzen Angmo	4:16:03

== Participation ==
The participation of 206 athletes (134 men/72 women) from 53 countries is reported.

- Algeria (1)
- Andorra (4)
- Argentina (1)
- Australia (1)
- Belgium (7)
- Bolivia (2)
- Brazil (5)
- Chile (1)
- China (5)
- Costa Rica (1)
- Croatia (5)
- Cyprus (2)
- Czech Republic (3)
- Denmark (3)
- Equatorial Guinea (1)
- Estonia (1)
- Ethiopia (9)
- France (9)
- Gabon (3)
- Germany (6)
- Hong Kong (2)
- Hungary (1)
- Iceland (1)
- India (6)
- Israel (4)
- Italy (9)
- Japan (7)
- Kazakhstan (2)
- Kenya (5)
- Kyrgyzstan (3)
- Mauritius (3)
- Mexico (8)
- Namibia (1)
- Palestine (1)
- Poland (3)
- Puerto Rico (2)
- Romania (5)
- Russia (9)
- Slovakia (4)
- South Africa (8)
- Spain (10)
- Sri Lanka (1)
- Sweden (1)
- Switzerland (2)
- Tanzania (3)
- Turkmenistan (2)
- Ukraine (7)
- United Kingdom (9)
- United States (10)
- Uruguay (1)
- Yemen (2)
- Zaire (1)
- Zimbabwe (3)

== See also ==
- 1996 in athletics (track and field)
