= 1994 IAAF World Cross Country Championships – Senior women's race =

Senior women's race at the 1994 IAAF World Cross Country Championships
- Organisers: IAAF
- Edition: 22nd
- Date: March 26
- Host city: Budapest, Hungary
- Venue: Kincsem Park
- Events: 1
- Distances: 6.22 km – Senior women
- Participation: 148 athletes from 36 nations

The Senior women's race at the 1994 IAAF World Cross Country Championships was held in Budapest, Hungary, at the Kincsem Park on March 26, 1994. A preview on the event was given in The Herald, and a report in The New York Times.

Complete results, medallists, and the results of British athletes were published.

== Race results ==
=== Senior women's race (6.22 km) ===
==== Individual ====
Rank	Athlete	Country	Time
1st place, gold medalist(s)	Hellen Chepngeno	Kenya	20:45
2nd place, silver medalist(s)	Catherina McKiernan	Ireland	20:52
3rd place, bronze medalist(s)	Conceição Ferreira	Portugal	20:52
4	Merima Denboba	Ethiopia	20:57
5	Albertina Dias	Portugal	20:59
6	Elana Meyer	South Africa	21:00
7	Zola Pieterse	South Africa	21:01
8	Farida Fatès	France	21:01
9	Olga Shurbanova	Russia	21:05
10	Fernanda Ribeiro	Portugal	21:05
11	Margareta Keszeg	Romania	21:06
12	Daria Nauer	Switzerland	21:10
13	Silvia Sommaggio	Italy	21:12
14	Getenesh Urge	Ethiopia	21:13
15	Claudia Stalder	Switzerland	21:17
16	Julia Vaquero	Spain	21:18
17	Sumie Yamaguchi	Japan	21:20
18	Joyce Chepchumba	Kenya	21:22
19	Asha Gigi	Ethiopia	21:24
20	Estela Estévez	Spain	21:26
21	Carmen Fuentes	Spain	21:27
22	Nina Belikova	Russia	21:28
23	Nadezhda Galyamova	Russia	21:30
24	Maria Guida	Italy	21:32
25	Jane Omoro	Kenya	21:32
26	Roseli Machado	Brazil	21:32
27	Gwyn Coogan	United States	21:33
28	Berhane Adere	Ethiopia	21:33
29	Iulia Negura	Romania	21:34
30	Yelena Kopytova	Russia	21:35
31	Hellen Kimaiyo	Kenya	21:35
32	Carole Montgomery	Canada	21:35
33	Yuko Kubota	Japan	21:37
34	Gete Wami	Ethiopia	21:38
35	Nathalie Téjéra	France	21:38
36	Pacifica Monda	Kenya	21:39
37	Mónica Gama	Portugal	21:39
38	Zahra Ouaziz	Morocco	21:39
39	Lucy Nusrala	United States	21:40
40	Maria Curatolo	Italy	21:41
41	Mitsuyo Yoshida	Japan	21:42
42	Tamara Koba	Ukraine	21:42
43	Chikako Suzuki	Japan	21:42
44	Carmen Troncoso	United States	21:43
45	Laura Adam	United Kingdom	21:44
46	Blandine Bitzner	France	21:44
47	Helána Barócsi	Hungary	21:45
48	Paula Schnurr	Canada	21:45
49	Maria Rébélo	France	21:46
50	Flavia Gaviglio	Italy	21:46
51	Aniela Nikiel	Poland	21:46
52	Nicole Whiteford	South Africa	21:47
53	Tatyana Belovol	Ukraine	21:47
54	Mónica Pont	Spain	21:47
55	Liz Wilson	United States	21:48
56	Leah Pells	Canada	21:50
57	Isabel Juárez	Mexico	21:52
58	Svetlana Miroshnik	Ukraine	21:54
59	Anchen Rose	South Africa	21:54
60	Li Dong	China	21:55
61	Tatyana Pozdnyakova	Ukraine	21:56
62	Olga Bondarenko	Russia	21:56
63	Grethe Koens	Netherlands	21:56
64	Julia Sakara	Zimbabwe	21:58
65	Alta Lohann	South Africa	21:58
66	Tian Mei	China	21:58
67	Daniela Bran	Romania	21:59
68	Emma Carney	Australia	21:59
69	Laura Cattivera	United States	21:59
70	Silvana Pereira	Brazil	22:00
71	Teresa Recio	Spain	22:00
72	Natalya Sorokivskaya	Kazakhstan	22:01
73	Carla Sacramento	Portugal	22:02
74	Teresa Duffy	Ireland	22:04
75	Yulia Kovalyova	Ukraine	22:05
76	Saida El Kouhail	Morocco	22:05
77	Tanya Blake	United Kingdom	22:06
78	Wendy Ore	United Kingdom	22:07
79	Paola Cabrera	Mexico	22:08
80	Vikki McPherson	United Kingdom	22:11
81	Leah Malot	Kenya	22:12
82	Anja Smolders	Belgium	22:12
83	Lucia Mendiola	Mexico	22:13
84	Roberta Brunet	Italy	22:14
85	Ana Oliveira	Portugal	22:15
86	Garifa Kuku	Kazakhstan	22:16
87	Wang Chunmei	China	22:17
88	Odile Ohier	France	22:18
89	Annette Palluy	France	22:19
90	Stella Castro	Colombia	22:20
91	Martha Tenorio	Ecuador	22:21
92	Anikó Javos	Hungary	22:21
93	Galina Baruk	Belarus	22:22
94	Nobuko Fujimura	Japan	22:24
95	Lisa Harvey	Canada	22:25
96	Mama Amele	Ethiopia	22:25
97	Judit Földing	Hungary	22:26
98	Kerryn McCann	Australia	22:26
99	Rose Lambe	Ireland	22:26
100	Tatyana Pentukova	Russia	22:27
101	Mónika Tóth	Hungary	22:27
102	Bouchra Moustaid	Morocco	22:29
103	Junko Asari	Japan	22:29
104	Desana Sourková	Czech Republic	22:30
105	Alina Gherasim	Romania	22:32
106	Amina Maanaoui	Morocco	22:33
107	Yelena Mostovaya	Kazakhstan	22:33
108	Kate Anderson	Australia	22:34
109	Beatriz Santíago	Spain	22:36
110	Soraya Telles	Brazil	22:37
111	Márta Visnyei	Hungary	22:38
112	Maureen Harrington	Ireland	22:40
113	Janina Malska	Poland	22:40
114	Ronell Scheepers	South Africa	22:42
115	Yelena Mazovka	Belarus	22:43
116	Simona Viola	Italy	22:44
117	Esmeraldo Guillen	Mexico	22:47
118	Yelena Makolova	Belarus	22:48
119	Carol Greenwood	United Kingdom	22:49
120	Luminita Gogîrlea	Romania	22:51
121	Jayne Spark	United Kingdom	22:53
122	Najat Ouali	Morocco	22:53
123	Viviany de Oliveira	Brazil	23:00
124	Isabel Carreno	Mexico	23:02
125	Maryann Murray	Australia	23:05
126	Iulia Ionescu	Romania	23:05
127	Yelena Tsukhlo	Belarus	23:09
128	Benita Perez	Mexico	23:15
129	Wei Yan	China	23:16
130	Fatiha Klilech	Morocco	23:21
131	Helena Javornik	Slovenia	23:23
132	Laura Coll	United States	23:26
133	Anna Baloghová	Slovakia	23:35
134	Natalya Dimitriyeva	Kazakhstan	23:41
135	Monica O'Reilly	Ireland	23:42
136	Andrea Hayoz	Switzerland	23:46
137	Zulma Ortíz	Argentina	23:55
138	Lukose Leelamma	India	24:15
139	Viktória Barta	Hungary	24:24
140	Kay Byrne	Ireland	24:26
141	Usha Verma	India	24:33
142	Roxana Coronati	Argentina	24:58
143	Inés Rodríguez	Argentina	24:59
144	Senka Golik	Croatia	25:01
145	Nancy Romero	Argentina	25:23
146	Vidya Deoghare	India	26:58
147	Bhageerathi Bille	India	27:32
—	Kathy Butler	Canada	DNF

==== Teams ====
Rank	Team	Points
1st place, gold medalist(s)	Portugal: Conceição Ferreira / 3; Albertina Dias / 5; Fernanda Ribeiro / 10; Mónica Gama / 37; (Carla Sacramento) / (73); (Ana Oliveira) / (85)	55
2nd place, silver medalist(s)	Ethiopia: Merima Denboba / 4; Getenesh Urge / 14; Asha Gigi / 19; Berhane Adere / 28; (Gete Wami) / (34); (Mama Amele) / (96)	65
3rd place, bronze medalist(s)	Kenya: Hellen Chepngeno / 1; Joyce Chepchumba / 18; Jane Omoro / 25; Hellen Kimaiyo / 31; (Pacifica Monda) / (36); (Leah Malot) / (81)	75
4	Russia: Olga Shurbanova / 9; Nina Belikova / 22; Nadezhda Galyamova / 23; Yelena Kopytova / 30; (Olga Bondarenko) / (62); (Tatyana Pentukova) / (100)	84
5	Spain: Julia Vaquero / 16; Estela Estévez / 20; Carmen Fuentes / 21; Mónica Pont / 54; (Teresa Recio) / (71); (Beatriz Santíago) / (109)	111
6	South Africa: Elana Meyer / 6; Zola Pieterse / 7; Nicole Whiteford / 52; Anchen Rose / 59; (Alta Lohann) / (65); (Ronell Scheepers) / (114)	124
7	Italy: Silvia Sommaggio / 13; Maria Guida / 24; Maria Curatolo / 40; Flavia Gaviglio / 50; (Roberta Brunet) / (84); (Simona Viola) / (116)	127
8	Japan: Sumie Yamaguchi / 17; Yuko Kubota / 33; Mitsuyo Yoshida / 41; Chikako Suzuki / 43; (Nobuko Fujimura) / (94); (Junko Asari) / (103)	134
9	France: Farida Fatès / 8; Nathalie Téjéra / 35; Blandine Bitzner / 46; Maria Rébélo / 49; (Odile Ohier) / (88); (Annette Palluy) / (89)	138
10	United States: Gwyn Coogan / 27; Lucy Nusrala / 39; Carmen Troncoso / 44; Liz Wilson / 55; (Laura Cattivera) / (69); (Laura Coll) / (132)	165
11	Romania: Margareta Keszeg / 11; Iulia Negura / 29; Daniela Bran / 67; Alina Gherasim / 105; (Luminita Gogîrlea) / (120); (Iulia Ionescu) / (126)	212
12	Ukraine: Tamara Koba / 42; Tatyana Belovol / 53; Svetlana Miroshnik / 58; Tatyana Pozdnyakova / 61; (Yulia Kovalyova) / (75)	214
13	Canada: Carole Montgomery / 32; Paula Schnurr / 48; Leah Pells / 56; Lisa Harvey / 95; (Kathy Butler) / (DNF)	231
14	United Kingdom: Laura Adam / 45; Tanya Blake / 77; Wendy Ore / 78; Vikki McPherson / 80; (Carol Greenwood) / (119); (Jayne Spark) / (121)	280
15	Ireland: Catherina McKiernan / 2; Teresa Duffy / 74; Rose Lambe / 99; Maureen Harrington / 112; (Monica O'Reilly) / (135); (Kay Byrne) / (140)	287
16	Morocco: Zahra Ouaziz / 38; Saida El Kouhail / 76; Bouchra Moustaid / 102; Amina Maanaoui / 106; (Najat Ouali) / (122); (Fatiha Klilech) / (130)	322
17	Brazil: Roseli Machado / 26; Silvana Pereira / 70; Soraya Telles / 110; Viviany de Oliveira / 123	329
18	Mexico: Isabel Juárez / 57; Paola Cabrera / 79; Lucia Mendiola / 83; Esmeraldo Guillen / 117; (Isabel Carreno) / (124); (Benita Perez) / (128)	336
19	Hungary: Helána Barócsi / 47; Anikó Javos / 92; Judit Földing / 97; Mónika Tóth / 101; (Márta Visnyei) / (111); (Viktória Barta) / (139)	337
20	China: Li Dong / 60; Tian Mei / 66; Wang Chunmei / 87; Wei Yan / 129	342
21	Australia: Emma Carney / 68; Kerryn McCann / 98; Kate Anderson / 108; Maryann Murray / 125	399
22	Kazakhstan: Natalya Sorokivskaya / 72; Garifa Kuku / 86; Yelena Mostovaya / 107; Natalya Dimitriyeva / 134	399
23	Belarus: Galina Baruk / 93; Yelena Mazovka / 115; Yelena Makolova / 118; Yelena Tsukhlo / 127	453
24	Argentina: Zulma Ortíz / 137; Roxana Coronati / 142; Inés Rodríguez / 143; Nancy Romero / 145	567
25	India: Lukose Leelamma / 138; Usha Verma / 141; Vidya Deoghare / 146; Bhageerathi Bille / 147	572

- Note: Athletes in parentheses did not score for the team result

== Participation ==
An unofficial count yields the participation of 148 athletes from 36 countries in the Senior women's race. This is in agreement with the official numbers as published.

- Argentina (4)
- Australia (4)
- Belarus (4)
- Belgium (1)
- Brazil (4)
- Canada (5)
- China (4)
- Colombia (1)
- Croatia (1)
- Czech Republic (1)
- Ecuador (1)
- Ethiopia (6)
- France (6)
- Hungary (6)
- India (4)
- Ireland (6)
- Italy (6)
- Japan (6)
- Kazakhstan (4)
- Kenya (6)
- Mexico (6)
- Morocco (6)
- Netherlands (1)
- Poland (2)
- Portugal (6)
- Romania (6)
- Russia (6)
- Slovakia (1)
- Slovenia (1)
- South Africa (6)
- Spain (6)
- Switzerland (3)
- Ukraine (5)
- United Kingdom (6)
- United States (6)
- Zimbabwe (1)

== See also ==
- 1994 IAAF World Cross Country Championships – Senior men's race
- 1994 IAAF World Cross Country Championships – Junior men's race
- 1994 IAAF World Cross Country Championships – Junior women's race
