= Athletics at the 1996 Summer Olympics – Women's 10,000 metres =

Women's 10,000 metres at the Games of the XXVI Olympiad
- Venue: Centennial Olympic Stadium
- Dates: 27 July 1996 (heats); 2 August 1996 (final)
- Competitors: 35 from 19 nations
- Winning time: 31:01.63 OR

Medalists
1st place, gold medalist(s)		Fernanda Ribeiro; Portugal
2nd place, silver medalist(s)		Wang Junxia; China
3rd place, bronze medalist(s)		Gete Wami; Ethiopia

These are the official results of the Women's 10,000 metres race at the 1996 Summer Olympics in Atlanta, Georgia. There were a total of 35 competitors.

== Results ==
=== Heats ===
Qualification: First 8 in each heat (Q) and the next 4 fastest (q) qualified to the final.

Rank	Heat	Name	Nationality	Time	Notes
1	2	Derartu Tulu	Ethiopia	31:35.90	Q
2	2	Sally Barsosio	Kenya	31:36.00	Q
3	2	Fernanda Ribeiro	Portugal	31:36.32	Q
4	2	Masako Chiba	Japan	31:37.03	Q
5	2	Iulia Negura	Romania	31:40.16	Q
6	2	Annemari Sandell	Finland	31:40.42	Q
7	2	Hiromi Suzuki	Japan	31:54.89	Q
8	2	Maria Guida	Italy	31:55.35	Q
9	2	Lyudmila Petrova	Russia	31:58.84	q
10	2	Wang Mingxia	China	32:10.26	q
11	1	Gete Wami	Ethiopia	32:20.92	Q
12	1	Birhane Adere	Ethiopia	32:21.09	Q
13	2	Yang Siju	China	32:22.77	q
14	2	Susan Hobson	Australia	32:25.13	q
15	1	Julia Vaquero	Spain	32:27.05	Q
16	1	Tegla Loroupe	Kenya	32:28.73	Q
17	1	Yuko Kawakami	Japan	32:31.69	Q
18	1	Catherina McKiernan	Ireland	32:32.10	Q
19	2	Joan Nesbit	United States	32:33.48	
20	1	Wang Junxia	China	32:36.53	Q
21	1	Colleen De Reuck	South Africa	32:39.19	Q
22	2	Firiya Sultanova	Russia	32:40.91	
23	1	Kate Fonshell	United States	32:48.05	
24	1	Nyla Carroll	New Zealand	32:50.64	
25	1	Silvia Sommaggio	Italy	32:59.40	
26	2	Chantal Dällenbach	France	33:22.35	
27	1	Klara Kashapova	Russia	33:28.34	
28	1	Kathrin Weßel	Germany	33:31.67	
29	1	Conceição Ferreira	Portugal	33:40.76	
30	2	Daria Nauer	Switzerland	33:56.95	
31	2	Olga Appell	United States	34:12.54	
32	1	Farida Fates	France	34:38.49	
33	2	Justine Nahimana	Burundi	35:58.51	
	1	Ursula Jeitziner	Switzerland	DNF	
	1	Kylie Risk	Australia	DNF	

=== Final ===
Rank	Name	Nationality	Time	Notes
1st place, gold medalist(s)	Fernanda Ribeiro	Portugal	31:01.63	OR, NR
2nd place, silver medalist(s)	Wang Junxia	China	31:02.58	
3rd place, bronze medalist(s)	Gete Wami	Ethiopia	31:06.65	
4	Derartu Tulu	Ethiopia	31:10.46	
5	Masako Chiba	Japan	31:20.62	
6	Tegla Loroupe	Kenya	31:23.22	
7	Yuko Kawakami	Japan	31:23.23	
8	Iulia Negura	Romania	31:26.46	
9	Julia Vaquero	Spain	31:27.07	
10	Sally Barsosio	Kenya	31:53.38	
11	Catherina McKiernan	Ireland	32:00.38	
12	Annemari Sandell	Finland	32:14.66	
13	Colleen De Reuck	South Africa	32:14.69	
14	Lyudmila Petrova	Russia	32:25.89	
15	Wang Mingxia	China	32:38.98	
16	Hiromi Suzuki	Japan	32:43.39	
17	Susan Hobson	Australia	32:47.71	
18	Birhane Adere	Ethiopia	32:57.35	
19	Yang Siju	China	33:15.29	
	Maria Guida	Italy	DNS	

== See also ==
- 1992 Women's Olympic 10.000 metres (Barcelona)
- 1993 Women's World Championships 10.000 metres (Stuttgart)
- 1994 Women's European Championships 10.000 metres (Helsinki)
- 1995 Women's World Championships 10.000 metres (Gothenburg)
- 1997 Women's World Championships 10.000 metres (Athens)
