= 1995 World Championships in Athletics – Women's 10,000 metres =

The women's 10,000 metres event featured at the 1995 World Championships in Gothenburg, Sweden. There were a total number of 34 participating athletes, and the two qualifying heats and the final were held on 9 August 1995.

== Final ==
RANK	FINAL	TIME
	Fernanda Ribeiro (POR)	31:04.99
	Derartu Tulu (ETH)	31:08.10
	Tegla Loroupe (KEN)	31:17.66
4.	Maria Guida (ITA)	31:27.82
5.	Elana Meyer (RSA)	31:31.96
6.	Liz McColgan (GBR)	31:40.14
7.	Alla Zhilyaeva (RUS)	31:52.15
8.	Hiromi Suzuki (JPN)	31:54.01
9.	Annemari Sandell (FIN)	31:54.29
10.	Kathrin Weßel (GER)	31:55.04
11.	Lieve Slegers (BEL)	32:10.59
12.	Lynn Jennings (USA)	32:12.82
13.	Conceição Ferreira (POR)	32:14.69
14.	Anne Marie Lauck (USA)	32:22.54
15.	Jill Hunter (GBR)	32:24.93
16.	Junko Kataoka (JPN)	32:45.43
17.	Marleen Renders (BEL)	32:47.46
18.	Gete Wami (ETH)	32:56.94
—	Albertina Dias (POR)	DNF
—	Yvonne Murray (GBR)	DNF

== Qualifying heats ==
- Held on Sunday 1995-08-06

RANK	HEAT 1	TIME
1.	Derartu Tulu (ETH)	32:16.71
2.	Yvonne Murray (GBR)	32:16.76
3.	Gete Wami (ETH)	32:17.41
4.	Tegla Loroupe (KEN)	32:17.92
5.	Elana Meyer (RSA)	32:17.97
6.	Junko Kataoka (JPN)	32:18.62
7.	Anne Marie Lauck (USA)	32:19.57
8.	Lieve Slegers (BEL)	32:21.29
9.	Jill Hunter (GBR)	32:22.93
10.	Conceição Ferreira (POR)	32:34.62
11.	Kathrin Weßel (GER)	32:46.51
12.	Dong Zhaoxia (CHN)	33:18.58
13.	Laurie Henes (USA)	33:22.92
14.	Martha Tenorio (ECU)	34:23.76
15.	Nora Rocha (MEX)	34:23.78
16.	Carol Galea (MLT)	35:30.84
—	Klara Kashapova (RUS)	DNF

RANK	HEAT 2	TIME
1.	Fernanda Ribeiro (POR)	32:33.87
2.	Liz McColgan (GBR)	32:33.89
3.	Lynn Jennings (USA)	32:33.89
4.	Maria Guida (ITA)	32:34.28
5.	Albertina Dias (POR)	32:34.44
6.	Annemari Sandell (FIN)	32:35.05
7.	Hiromi Suzuki (JPN)	32:39.92
8.	Marleen Renders (BEL)	32:45.50
9.	Alla Zhilyaeva (RUS)	32:51.55
10.	Yasuko Kimura (JPN)	32:54.82
11.	Berhane Adere (ETH)	33:14.76
12.	Carmen Fuentes (ESP)	33:16.86
13.	Serap Aktaş (TUR)	34:19.25
14.	Carole Montgomery (CAN)	34:23.16
15.	Martha Ernstsdottir (ISL)	34:29.55
16.	Virginie Gloum (CAF)	40:07.49 (NR)
—	Catherina McKiernan (IRL)	DNS

== See also ==
- 1991 Women's World Championships 10.000 metres (Tokyo)
- 1992 Women's Olympic 10.000 metres (Barcelona)
- 1993 Women's World Championships 10.000 metres (Stuttgart)
- 1994 Women's European Championships 10.000 metres (Helsinki)
- 1996 Women's Olympic 10.000 metres (Atlanta)
- 1997 Women's World Championships 10.000 metres (Athens)
