= 1997 World Marathon Cup =

World Marathon Cup in Athens

The 1997 World Marathon Cup was the seventh edition of the World Marathon Cup of athletics and were held in Athens, Greece, inside of the 1997 World Championships.

== Results ==
Team men
#	Nations	Time
1	Spain; Abel Antón; Martín Fiz; Fabián Roncero	6:43:30
2	Italy; Danilo Goffi; Giacomo Leone; Francesco Ingargiola	6:55:33
3	Brazil; Luíz Antônio dos Santos; Vanderlei de Lima; Osmiro Silva	7:02:56

Team women
#	Nations	Time
1	Japan; Hiromi Suzuki; Takako Tobise; Nobuko Fujimura	7:38:57
2	Romania; Lidia Șimon; Anuța Cătună; Aurica Buia	7:52:18
3	Italy; Ornella Ferrara; Franca Fiacconi; Laura Fogli	7:56:31

Individual men
#	Athlete	Time
1st place, gold medalist(s)	Abel Antón (ESP)	2:13:16
2nd place, silver medalist(s)	Martín Fiz (ESP)	2:13:21
3rd place, bronze medalist(s)	Steve Moneghetti (AUS)	2:14:16
4	Danilo Goffi (ITA)	2:14:47
5	Luíz Antônio dos Santos (BRA)	2:15:31
6	Fabián Roncero (ESP)	2:16:53
7	Giacomo Leone (ITA)	2:17:16
8	Azzedine Sakhri (ALG)	2:17:44
9	Eduard Tukhbatullin (RUS)	2:17:44
10	António Rodrigues (POR)	2:17:54

Individual women
#	Athlete	Time
1st place, gold medalist(s)	Hiromi Suzuki (JPN)	2:29:48
2nd place, silver medalist(s)	Manuela Machado (POR)	2:31:12
3rd place, bronze medalist(s)	Lidia Șimon (ROM)	2:31:55
4	Takako Tobise (JPN)	2:32:18
5	Ornella Ferrara (ITA)	2:33:10
6	Iris Biba (GER)	2:34:06
7	Sonja Krolik (GER)	2:35:28
8	Franziska Rochat-Moser (SUI)	2:36:16
9	Yelena Razdrogina (RUS)	2:36:37
10	Nobuko Fujimura (JPN)	2:36:51

== See also ==
- 1997 World Championships in Athletics – Men's Marathon
- 1997 World Championships in Athletics – Women's Marathon
