= 1996 Boston Marathon =

Footrace in Boston, Massachusetts, USA

- Venue: Boston, United States
- Dates: April 15

Champions
- Men: Moses Tanui (2:09:16)
- Women: Uta Pippig (2:27:13)

The 1996 Boston Marathon was the 100th running of the annual marathon race in Boston, United States, which was held on April 15. The elite men's race was won by Kenya's Moses Tanui in a time of 2:09:16 hours and the women's race was won by Germany's Uta Pippig in 2:27:13.

== Results ==
=== Men ===
Position	Athlete	Nationality	Time
1st place, gold medalist(s)	Moses Tanui	Kenya	2:09:16
2nd place, silver medalist(s)	Ezequiel Bitok	Kenya	2:09:26
3rd place, bronze medalist(s)	Cosmas Ndeti	Kenya	2:09:51
4	Lameck Aguta	Kenya	2:10:03
5	Sammy Lelei	Kenya	2:10:11
6	Abebe Mekonnen	Ethiopia	2:10:21
7	Charles Tangus	Kenya	2:10:28
8	Paul Yego	Kenya	2:10:49
9	Carlos Grisales	Colombia	2:11:17
10	Steve Moneghetti	Australia	2:11:17
11	Luíz Antônio dos Santos	Brazil	2:11:49
12	Gilbert Rutto	Kenya	2:12:29
13	Andrés Espinosa	Mexico	2:13:05
14	Samwel Maritim	Kenya	2:13:13
15	Jan Huruk	Poland	2:13:14
16	João Lopes	Portugal	2:13:15
17	Simon Lopuyet	Kenya	2:14:34
18	Eric Kimaiyo	Kenya	2:14:37
19	André Luiz Ramos	Brazil	2:14:51
20	Tumo Turbo	Ethiopia	2:14:59

=== Women ===
Position	Athlete	Nationality	Time
1st place, gold medalist(s)	Uta Pippig	Germany	2:27:13
2nd place, silver medalist(s)	Tegla Loroupe	Kenya	2:28:37
3rd place, bronze medalist(s)	Nobuko Fujimura	Japan	2:29:24
4	Sonja Oberem	Germany	2:29:24
5	Larisa Zyusko	Russia	2:31:06
6	Franziska Rochat-Moser	Switzerland	2:31:33
7	Madina Biktagirova	Belarus	2:31:38
8	Lorraine Moller	New Zealand	2:32:02
9	Alla Zhilyaeva	Russia	2:33:27
10	Valentina Enachi	Moldova	2:33:58
11	Márcia Narloch	Brazil	2:34:27
12	Selina Chirchir	Kenya	2:34:33
13	Solange de Souza	Brazil	2:34:54
14	Stefanija Statkuvienė	Lithuania	2:36:42
15	Lizanne Bussières	Canada	2:36:55
	Mieke Hombergen	Netherlands	2:41:55
