= Athletics at the 1987 Pan American Games – Women's 3000 metres =

Women's 3000 metres at the Pan American Games

The women's 3000 metres event at the 1987 Pan American Games was held in Indianapolis, United States on 16 August.

== Results ==
Rank	Name	Nationality	Time	Notes
1st place, gold medalist(s)	Mary Knisely	United States	9:06.75	
2nd place, silver medalist(s)	Angela Chalmers	Canada	9:14.48	
3rd place, bronze medalist(s)	Leslie Seymour	United States	9:19.26	
4	Susan Lee	Canada	9:21.91	
5	Carmem de Oliveira	Brazil	9:22.62	
6	Michelle Bush	Cayman Islands	9:35.52	NR
7	Mónica Regonesi	Chile	9:50.08	
8	Isabel Juárez	Mexico	9:55.58	
9	Kriscia García	El Salvador	10:09.03	
10	Yolanda Quimbita	Ecuador	10:39.74	
11	Natividad Fernández	Paraguay	11:13.38	
	Olga Caccaviello	Argentina	DNS	
	Maria-Luisa Servin	Mexico	DNS	
	Teresa Paucar	Ecuador	DNS	
