= Athletics at the 1991 Summer Universiade – Women's 10,000 metres =

Women's event at the 1991 Summer Universiade

The women's 10,000 metres event at the 1991 Summer Universiade was held at the Don Valley Stadium in Sheffield on 22 July 1991.

== Results ==
Rank	Athlete	Nationality	Time	Notes
1st place, gold medalist(s)	Anne Marie Letko	United States	32:36.87	PB
2nd place, silver medalist(s)	Suzana Ćirić	Yugoslavia	32:37.94	NR
3rd place, bronze medalist(s)	Olga Nazarkina	Soviet Union	32:40.83	
4	Trina Painter	United States	32:41.44	
5	Carmem de Oliveira Fuentes	Brazil	32:44.89	AR
6	Maria Guida	Italy	32:45.36	
7	Wilma van Onna	Netherlands	32:48.94	
8	Carmen Fuentes	Spain	33:12.92	
9	Yosie Terazawa	Japan	33:21.32	
10	Vicki Vaughan	Great Britain	33:47.35	
11	Claire Lavers	Great Britain	34:01.49	
12	Beatrice Ayikoru	Uganda	34:03.41	NR
13	Mariana Stanescu	Romania	34:06.01	
14	Simona Staicu	Romania	34:11.27	
15	Lucille Smith	Canada	34:28.96	
