= 1994 European Athletics Championships – Women's 10,000 metres =

Women's 10,000 metres at the European Athletics Championships

These are the official results of the Women's 10,000 metres event at the 1994 European Championships in Helsinki, Finland. The final was held at Helsinki Olympic Stadium on 13 August 1994.

== Medalists ==
Gold	Fernanda Ribeiro; Portugal
Silver	Maria Conceição Ferreira; Portugal
Bronze	Daria Nauer; Switzerland

== Final ==
Rank	Final	Time
	Fernanda Ribeiro (POR)	31:08.75
	Conceiçao Ferreira (POR)	31:32.82
	Daria Nauer (SUI)	31:35.96
4.	Kathrin Weßel (GER)	31:38.75
5.	Cristina Misaros (ROM)	31:41.03
6.	Maria Guida (ITA)	31:42.14
7.	Fernanda Marques (POR)	31:53.12
8.	Klara Kashapova (RUS)	31:55.99
9.	Claudia Lokar (GER)	32:08.74
10.	Marleen Renders (BEL)	32:11.18
11.	Nicole Lévêque (FRA)	32:12.07
12.	Gitte Karlshøj (DEN)	32:26.25
13.	Iulia Negură (ROM)	32:29.07
14.	Claudia Metzner (GER)	32:38.11
15.	Tatyana Pentukova (RUS)	32:40.72
16.	Milka Mikhailova (BUL)	32:55.73
17.	Serap Aktaş (TUR)	32:59.76
18.	Carmen Fuentes (ESP)	33:05.55
19.	Martha Ernstsdóttir (ISL)	33:24.78
20.	Päivi Tikkanen (FIN)	34:22.45
—	Catherina McKiernan (IRL)	DNF

== Participation ==
According to an unofficial count, 21 athletes from 15 countries participated in the event.

- Belgium (1)
- Bulgaria (1)
- Denmark (1)
- Finland (1)
- France (1)
- Germany (3)
- Iceland (1)
- Ireland (1)
- Italy (1)
- Portugal (3)
- Romania (2)
- Russia (2)
- Spain (1)
- Switzerland (1)
- Turkey (1)

== See also ==
- 1990 Women's European Championships 10,000 metres (Split)
- 1991 Women's World Championships 10,000 metres (Tokyo)
- 1992 Women's Olympic 10,000 metres (Barcelona)
- 1993 Women's World Championships 10,000 metres (Stuttgart)
- 1995 Women's World Championships 10,000 metres (Gothenburg)
- 1996 Women's Olympic 10,000 metres (Atlanta)
- 1997 Women's World Championships 10,000 metres (Athens)
- 1998 Women's European Championships 10,000 metres (Budapest)
