= 1997 World Championships in Athletics – Women's 10,000 metres =

The women's 10,000 metres event featured at the 1997 World Championships in Athens, Greece. There were a total number of 34 participating athletes, with two qualifying heats on 2 August and the final being held on 5 August 1997.

== Results ==
=== Heats ===
First 8 of each Heat (Q) and the next 4 fastest (q) qualified for the Final.

Rank	Heat	Name	Nationality	Time	Notes
1	2	Berhane Adere	Ethiopia	32:05.29	Q, SB
2	2	Fernanda Ribeiro	Portugal	32:05.65	Q
3	2	Sally Barsosio	Kenya	32:05.68	Q, SB
4	2	Gete Wami	Ethiopia	32:05.73	Q
5	2	Masako Chiba	Japan	32:05.76	Q
6	2	Yang Siju	China	32:06.12	Q, SB
7	2	Colleen De Reuck	South Africa	32:09.56	Q
8	2	Hiromi Masuda	Japan	32:11.63	Q
9	2	Julia Vaquero	Spain	32:12.25	q
10	2	Annette Peters	United States	32:14.08	q
11	2	Chantal Dallenbach	France	32:49.40	q
12	2	Marleen Renders	Belgium	33:02.37	q
13	1	Nora Leticia Rocha	Mexico	33:07.09	Q
14	1	Annemari Sandell	Finland	33:07.50	Q
15	1	Ren Xiujuan	China	33:08.12	Q, SB
16	1	Silvia Sommaggio	Italy	33:08.19	Q
17	1	Tegla Loroupe	Kenya	33:08.20	Q
18	1	Chiemi Takahashi	Japan	33:08.26	Q
19	1	Zahia Dahmani	France	33:08.68	Q
20	1	Elana Meyer	South Africa	33:09.70	Q
21	2	Helena Sampaio	Portugal	33:14.85	
22	1	Khrysostomia Iakovou	Greece	33:14.86	
23	1	Olivera Jevtić	Yugoslavia	33:18.42	
24	1	Derartu Tulu	Ethiopia	33:25.99	
25	2	Adriana Fernández	Mexico	33:40.09	
26	2	Kylie Risk	Australia	33:56.48	SB
27	1	Gwyn Coogan	United States	34:06.34	
28	2	Maysa Matrood	Iraq	35:44.93	NR
29	1	Yvonne Danson	Singapore	37:19.51	
30	1	Ela Esperanza Obono	Equatorial Guinea	45:13.69	
	1	Marina Bastos	Portugal	DNF	
	1	Nyla Carroll	New Zealand	DNF	

=== Final ===
Rank	Name	Result
	Sally Barsosio (KEN)	31:32.92
	Fernanda Ribeiro (POR)	31:39.15
	Masako Chiba (JPN)	31:41.93
4.	Berhane Adere (ETH)	31:48.95
5.	Ren Xiujuan (CHN)	31:50.63
6.	Tegla Loroupe (KEN)	32:00.93
7.	Yang Siju (CHN)	32:01.61
8.	Colleen De Reuck (RSA)	32:03.81
9.	Silvia Sommaggio (ITA)	32:16.92
10.	Chiemi Takahashi (JPN)	32:23.61
11.	Nora Rocha (MEX)	32:34.58
12.	Julia Vaquero (ESP)	32:36.91
13.	Annette Peters (USA)	32:43.38
14.	Chantal Dallenbach (FRA)	32:51.20
15.	Annemari Sandell (FIN)	33:00.11
16.	Hiromi Masuda (JPN)	33:03.14
17.	Elana Meyer (RSA)	33:05.82
—	Marleen Renders (BEL)	DNF
—	Zahia Dahmani (FRA)	DNF
—	Gete Wami (ETH)	DNF

== See also ==
- 1995 Women's World Championships 10.000 metres
- 1996 Women's Olympic 10.000 metres
- 1999 Women's World Championships 10.000 metres
