= Takako Tobise =

Japanese long-distance runner

Takako Tobise (Japanese: 飛瀬 貴子; born 2 June 1974) is a Japanese female former long-distance runner who specialised in marathon running.

She had a very short-lived career. At the start of 1997 she set a personal best of 1:09:22 hours for half marathon in Tokyo before claiming the 10,000 metres title at the All Japan Corporate Track and Field Championships. At the Nagoya Women's Marathon, a third-place finish in 2:29:37 hours earned her an international call-up for Japan at the 1997 World Championships in Athletics. At the competition in Tokyo the 23-year-old managed to finish fourth on her international debut with a run of 2:32:18 hours. Combined with the performances of winner Hiromi Suzuki and tenth-placer Nobuko Fujimura, this performance helped the Japanese women to the title at the 1997 World Marathon Cup.

Following her global performance she returned to the Nagoya Marathon in 1998, but her time of 2:35:26 hours left her out of contention and she did not compete internationally thereafter.

== International competitions ==
Year	Competition	Venue	Position	Event	Notes
1997	World Championships	Athens, Greece	4th	Marathon	2:32:18
1997	World Marathon Cup	Athens, Greece	1st	Team	7:38:57
