= 1995 Boston Marathon =

Footrace in Boston, Massachusetts, USA

- Venue: Boston, United States
- Dates: April 17

Champions
- Men: Cosmas Ndeti (2:09:22)
- Women: Uta Pippig (2:25:11)

The 1995 Boston Marathon was the 99th running of the annual marathon race in Boston, United States, which was held on April 17. The elite men's race was won by Kenya's Cosmas Ndeti in a time of 2:09:22 hours and the women's race was won by Germany's Uta Pippig in 2:25:11.

A total of 8258 people finished the race, 6409 men and 1849 women.

== Results ==
=== Men ===
Position	Athlete	Nationality	Time
1st place, gold medalist(s)	Cosmas Ndeti	Kenya	2:09:22
2nd place, silver medalist(s)	Moses Tanui	Kenya	2:10:22
3rd place, bronze medalist(s)	Luíz Antônio dos Santos	Brazil	2:11:02
4	Lameck Aguta	Kenya	2:11:03
5	Paul Yego	Kenya	2:11:13
6	Alberto Juzdado	Spain	2:12:04
7	Kim Jae-ryong	South Korea	2:12:15
8	Sam Nyangincha	Kenya	2:12:16
9	Gilbert Rutto	Kenya	2:12:25
10	Thabiso Moqhali	Lesotho	2:12:56
11	Isidro Rico	Mexico	2:13:10
12	Kim Wan-gi	South Korea	2:13:32
13	Charles Tangus	Kenya	2:14:08
14	Barnabas Rotich	Kenya	2:14:25
15	Peter Maher	Canada	2:14:33
16	Kim Min-woo	South Korea	2:15:08
17	Martín Mondragón	Mexico	2:16:29
18	Jorge Marquez	Mexico	2:16:50
19	Clair Antonio Wathier	Brazil	2:17:49
20	Hector Dejesus	Mexico	2:18:45
21	Jose Jacinto López	Colombia	2:19:09
22	Barnabas Katui	Kenya	2:19:31
23	Yuriy Mikhailov	Russia	2:19:37
24	Richard Verney	New Zealand	2:19:41
25	Artemio Navarro	Mexico	2:20:31

=== Women ===
Position	Athlete	Nationality	Time
1st place, gold medalist(s)	Uta Pippig	Germany	2:25:11
2nd place, silver medalist(s)	Elana Meyer	South Africa	2:26:51
3rd place, bronze medalist(s)	Madina Biktagirova	Belarus	2:29:00
4	Franziska Rochat-Moser	Switzerland	2:29:35
5	Yvonne Danson	United Kingdom	2:30:53
6	Yoshiko Yamamoto	Japan	2:31:39
7	Mari Tanigawa	Japan	2:31:48
8	Susan Mahoney	Australia	2:33:07
9	Tegla Loroupe	Kenya	2:33:10
10	Martha Tenorio	Ecuador	2:33:34
11	Linda Somers	United States	2:34:30
12	Claudia Metzner	Germany	2:36:22
13	Ai Sugihara	Japan	2:37:07
14	Mayuko Kosaka	Japan	2:37:59
15	Valentina Enachi	Moldova	2:38:15
16	Maria Guadalupe Loma	Mexico	2:39:31
17	Tatyana Pozdnyakova	Ukraine	2:40:26
18	Irina Bondarchuk	Russia	2:43:42
19	Ayako Suzuki	Japan	2:44:18
20	Iglandini González	Colombia	2:44:45
21	Kinuyo Yoshida	Japan	2:45:26
22	Mary O'Connor	New Zealand	2:47:03
23	Marion Schöler	Germany	2:47:58
24	Cindy Keeler	United States	2:48:02
25	Lynn Holda	United States	2:49:40
