= Christine Mallo =

French athletics competitor

Personal information
- Nationality: French
- Born: 26 February 1966 (age 59) Orléans
- Years active: 1990s
- Height: 1.63 m (5 ft 4 in)

Sport
- Event: distance running
- Coached by: Alexandre Gonzales, Bernard Faure

Christine Mallo (born 26 February 1966 at Orléans) is a French former athlete, who specialized in long-distance running.

She won the French national title in the half marathon in 1995. In 1996, at the IAAF World Half Marathon Championships in Palma de Mallorca, Spain, Mallo placed sixth in the individual event in 1:12:24, and won the silver medal in the team event alongside her compatriots Zahia Dahmani and Muriel Linsolas.

She placed 14th in the marathon at the 1997 IAAF World Championships in Athletics in Athens with the time of 2:40:55.

Her personal best for the marathon, established in 1999, is 2:31:49.

== International competitions ==
Year	Competition	Venue	Position	Event	Notes
1996	Half Marathon World Championships	Palma, Spain	6th	Half marathon	1:12:24
1996	Half Marathon World Championships	Palma, Spain	2nd	Team	3:38:44
1997	World Championships	Athens, Greece	14th	Marathon	2:40:55

== Personal bests ==
Event	Performance	Location	Date
Half marathon	1:11:29	Nice	29 March 1998
Marathon	2:31:49	Rotterdam	18 April 1999
