= Athletics at the 1993 Summer Universiade – Men's marathon =

The men's marathon event at the 1993 Summer Universiade was held in Buffalo, United States on 18 July 1993.

== Results ==
Rank	Athlete	Nationality	Time	Notes
1st place, gold medalist(s)	Kennedy Manyisa	Kenya	2:12:19	UR
2nd place, silver medalist(s)	Kim Wan-ki	South Korea	2:15:35	
3rd place, bronze medalist(s)	Hyung Jae-young	South Korea	2:15:53	
4	Marco Di Lieto	Italy	2:18:18	
5	Hideyuki Oe	Japan	2:18:26	
6	Daniel Rathbone	Great Britain	2:18:34	
7	Sergio Jiménez	Mexico	2:19:20	
8	Howard Nippert	United States	2:19:35	
9	Makoto Ogura	Japan	2:23:29	
10	Patrick Kangara	Kenya	2:26:42	
11	Tsai Yi-cheng	Chinese Taipei	2:29:51	
12	Mukti Pathak	Nepal	2:43:32	
13	Dilesh Shrestha	Nepal	2:48:49	
	James Estes	United States	DNF	
	Giacomo Leone	Italy	DNF	
