= Athletics at the 1993 Summer Universiade – Women's 3000 metres =

The women's 3000 metres event at the 1993 Summer Universiade was held at the UB Stadium in Buffalo, United States on 17 July 1993. This was the last time this event was held at the Games, being replaced with the 5000 metres at the 1995 edition.

== Results ==
Rank	Athlete	Nationality	Time	Notes
1st place, gold medalist(s)	Clare Eichner	United States	9:04.32	
2nd place, silver medalist(s)	Iulia Ionescu	Romania	9:05.10	
3rd place, bronze medalist(s)	Rosalind Taylor	United States	9:06.25	
4	Julia Vaquero	Spain	9:06.25	
5	Milka Mihaylova	Bulgaria	9:07.10	
6	Lisa Harvey	Canada	9:10.68	
7	Silvia Botticelli	Italy	9:11.65	
8	Natalia Azpiazu	Spain	9:15.79	
9	Natsue Koikawa	Japan	9:21.18	
10	Geraldine Hendricken	Ireland	9:25.01	
11	Amina Amaddah	Morocco	9:25.45	
12	Kay Gooch	New Zealand	9:34.47	
13	Shirley Cespedes	Costa Rica	10:12.99	
14	Mirna El-Hajj	Lebanon	11:17.68	
15	Nthamane Malepa	Lesotho	11:32.14	
