= Benjamin Keleketu =

Botswana long-distance runner

Personal information
- Nationality: Botswana
- Born: 6 February 1965 (age 60)
- Height: 1.50 m (4 ft 11 in)
- Weight: 55 kg (121 lb)

Sport
- Sport: Long-distance running cross country running
- Event: Marathon

Benjamin Keleketu (born 6 February 1965) is a Botswana former long-distance runner and cross country runner. He competed in the men's marathon at the 1992 Summer Olympics and the 1996 Summer Olympics.

== Career ==
As a cross country runner he competed in the men's race at the 1991 IAAF World Cross Country Championships in Antwerp, Belgium.

Ahead of the 1992 Summer Olympics he trained about 55 kilometres per week. He ran his first ever marathon in April 1992.

The marathon event at the 1992 Summer Olympics was the second marathon he ever ran. During the marathon he was "racked by pain and suffering" and found the "hill of hell" up to the stadium sheer purgatory but was devoted to reach the finish line. He finished the marathon as one of the last runners, 32 minutes after the South Korean winner. He had to finish the race at a warm-up track, as the Barcelona Olympic Stadium was needed for the 1992 Summer Olympics closing ceremony. Keleketu said after the finish in extensive comments how hard it was but that he will win next time.

He also represented his country at the 1995 IAAF World Half Marathon Championships in France.
