= Carlos de la Torre =

Spanish distance runner (born 1966)

Carlos de la Torre Allariz (born 18 May 1966 in Marín, Pontevedra) is a retired Spanish long-distance runner who specialized in the 10,000 metres.

== Achievements ==
Year	Competition	Venue	Position	Event	Notes
Representing Spain
1990	Ibero-American Championships	Manaus, Brazil	3rd	10,000m	29:49.19
1994	European Championships	Helsinki, Finland	8th	10,000 m	28:10.77
1996	Olympic Games	Atlanta, United States	14th	10,000 m	28:32.11
1996	World Half Marathon Championships	Palma de Mallorca, Spain	4th	Half marathon	1:02:03
1996	World Half Marathon Championships	Palma de Mallorca, Spain	2nd	Team	3:08:36

=== Personal bests ===
- 5000 metres - 14:01.42 min (1994)
- 10,000 metres - 28:09.63 min (1994)
