= Annalisa Scurti =

Italian long-distance runner (born 1969)

Personal information
- National team: Italy (3 caps from 1989-1996)
- Born: 20 January 1969 (age 57) Pescara, Italy

Sport
- Country: Italy
- Sport: Athletics
- Event: Long-distance running

Achievements and titles
- Personal best: Half marathon: 1:13:41 (1996)
Medal record
World Half Marathon Championships
Bronze medal – third place	1996 Palma de Mallorca	Team

Annalisa Scurti (born 20 January 1969) is a former Italian female long-distance runner who competed at individual senior level at the IAAF World Half Marathon Championships.

She also won a bronze medal with the national team at 1996 IAAF World Half Marathon Championships.
