= 1993 World Championships in Athletics – Women's 10,000 metres =

The women's 10,000 metres event featured at the 1993 World Championships in Stuttgart, Germany. There were a total number of 42 participating athletes, with two qualifying heats and the final being held on 21 August 1993.

The race was conducted in almost 30 °C temperatures, but the Chinese team took the race out at a pace only seen once before, during Ingrid Kristiansen's world record race 5 years earlier. Zhong Huandi took the pace for her 20 year old country mate Wang Junxia, while the others struggled to keep up. 15 year old Sally Barsosio stayed close to the pace, but her inexperience and erratic movements disrupted the flow for several runners near her. At one point during the race she was shown a yellow card by an umpire to essentially tell her to get out of the way. After getting spiked too many times from Barsosio's back kick, Elana Meyer walked off the track. The fast pace eventually slowed mid-race, then in frustration, Wang took off, separating from the chase pack of Zhong, Barsosio and Tegla Loroupe. Wang began dropping her lap times progressively 72, 71, 70, 69, 68. She capped it off with a 61 final lap for a championship record 30:49.30. Half a lap back, Barsosio had edged ahead of with Loroupe unable to maintain the pace and fading, then Zhong launched into a sprint the loping Barsosio could not match, pulling away to a three second gap for silver. After the race, Barsosio was disqualified, only to be reinstated on appeal. A little over two weeks later, Wang demolished the world record, running 29:31.78, part of a record smashing National Games of China when three major women's distance records were set. Wang's 10,000 record lasted until the 2016 Olympics when it was smashed by Ethiopian Almaz Ayana. Her 3000 metres record from 1993 has never been beaten. 4th place in that 1993 Chinese race was still the #4 time in history until 2019. In 2016, a letter written by Wang in 1995 was published where she is said to have admitted to herself and her Liaoning teammates doping. Zhong trained with a different group in Yunnan. Four years later Barsosio won this race as a 19 year old.

== Final ==
RANK	FINAL	TIME
	Wang Junxia (CHN)	30:49.30 CR
	Zhong Huandi (CHN)	31:12.55
	Sally Barsosio (KEN)	31:15.38
4.	Tegla Loroupe (KEN)	31:29.91
5.	Lynn Jennings (USA)	31:30.53
6.	Conceição Ferreira (POR)	31:30.60
7.	Albertina Dias (POR)	31:33.03
8.	Anne Marie Letko (USA)	31:37.36
9.	Uta Pippig (GER)	31:39.97
10.	Fernanda Ribeiro (POR)	31:40.51
11.	Carmem de Oliveira (BRA)	31:47.76
12.	Maria Guida (ITA)	32:15.34
13.	Kathrin Ullrich-Weßel (GER)	32:27.38
14.	Olga Appell (MEX)	32:32.51
15.	Naomi Yoshida (JPN)	32:35.44
16.	Iulia Negura-Olteanu (ROM)	32:40.61
17.	Izumi Maki (JPN)	32:53.41
18.	Rosario Murcia (FRA)	32:54.65
19.	Suzana Ćirić (IPU)	33:36.72
20.	Isabel Juarez (MEX)	33:28.47
21.	Elaine Van Blunk (USA)	33:42.85
22.	Gitte Karlshoj (DEN)	33:58.58
—	Catherina McKiernan (IRL)	DNF
—	Päivi Tikkanen (FIN)	DNF
—	Elana Meyer (RSA)	DNF

== Qualifying heats ==
- Held on Thursday 1993-08-19

RANK	HEAT 1	TIME
1.	Sally Barsosio (KEN)	32:27.99
2.	Lynn Jennings (USA)	32:28.30
3.	Wang Junxia (CHN)	32:28.35
4.	Albertina Dias (POR)	32:28.39
5.	Conceição Ferreira (POR)	32:28.42
6.	Naomi Yoshida (JPN)	32:28.66
7.	Carmem de Oliveira (BRA)	32:29.48
8.	Uta Pippig (GER)	32:31.90
9.	Iulia Negura-Olteanu (ROM)	32:32.51
10.	Olga Appell (MEX)	32:34.43
11.	Rosario Murcia (FRA)	32:56.24
12.	Elaine Van Blunk (USA)	33:06.44
13.	Julia Sakara (ZIM)	33:20.16 (NR)
14.	Junko Kataoka (JPN)	33:21.31
15.	Viktoriya Nenasheva (RUS)	33:23.19
16.	Lisa Harvey (CAN)	33:24.66
17.	Vikki McPherson (GBR)	33:49.51
18.	Jayanthi Palaniappan (MAS)	33:56.72
19.	Barbara Moore (NZL)	34:38.27
20.	Aura Morales (GUA)	36:06.02
—	Martha Ernstsdottir (ISL)	DNS

RANK	HEAT 2	TIME
1.	Anne Marie Letko (USA)	32:26.22
2.	Zhong Huandi (CHN)	32:26.40
3.	Maria Guida (ITA)	32:26.60
4.	Tegla Loroupe (KEN)	32:26.67
5.	Izumi Maki (JPN)	32:26.89
6.	Elana Meyer (RSA)	32:28.02
7.	Fernanda Ribeiro (POR)	32:29.21
8.	Päivi Tikkanen (FIN)	32:51.72
9.	Kathrin Ullrich-Weßel (GER)	32:52.06
10.	Suzana Ćirić (IPU)	32:58.38
11.	Catherina McKiernan (IRL)	33:00.38
12.	Gitte Karlshoj (DEN)	33:05.13
13.	Isabel Juarez (MEX)	33:17.94
14.	Berhane Adere (ETH)	33:20.62
15.	Martha Tenorio (ECU)	33:50.68
16.	Lesley Morton (NZL)	33:54.39
17.	Marilu Salazar (PER)	34:58.62
18.	Gulsara Dadabayeva (TJK)	39:30.28
19.	Tevdenshigmed Enh-Od (MGL)	40:32.86
—	Ma Ningning (CHN)	DNS
—	Tamara Koba (UKR)	DNS

== See also ==
- 1990 Women's European Championships 10,000 metres (Split)
- 1991 Women's World Championships 10,000 metres (Tokyo)
- 1992 Women's Olympic 10,000 metres (Barcelona)
- 1994 Women's European Championships 10,000 metres (Helsinki)
- 1995 Women's World Championships 10,000 metres (Gothenburg)
- 1996 Women's Olympic 10,000 metres (Atlanta)
