= Athletics at the 1987 Pan American Games – Women's 10,000 metres =

Women's 10,000 metres at the Pan American Games

The women's 10,000 metres event at the 1987 Pan American Games was held in Indianapolis, United States on 13 August. It was the first time that this event was contested at the Games.

== Results ==
Rank	Name	Nationality	Time	Notes
1st place, gold medalist(s)	Marta Cooksey	United States	33:00.00	GR
2nd place, silver medalist(s)	Nancy Tinari	Canada	33:02.51	
3rd place, bronze medalist(s)	Patti Murray	United States	33:38.12	
4	Mónica Regonesi	Chile	33:48.67	NR
5	Carmem de Oliveira	Brazil	34:24.63	
6	Michelle Bush	Cayman Islands	34:41.67	
7	Teresa Paucar	Ecuador	35:21.71	NR
8	María Luisa Servín	Mexico	36:19.56	
9	Olga Caccaviello	Argentina	37:27.51	
10	Yolanda Quimbita	Ecuador	37:33.23	
11	Cornelia Melis	Aruba	39:50.39	
12	Natividad Fernández	Paraguay	41:13.71	
	Santa Velázquez	Mexico	DNF	
