= Anne Marie Letko =

American long-distance runner

Personal information
- Born: March 7, 1969 (age 57) Rochester, New York, United States

Sport
- Sport: Long-distance running Marathon running
Medal record
Representing United States
Summer Universiade
Gold medal – first place	1991 Sheffield	10,000m

Anne Marie Letko (married name Lauck; born March 7, 1969) is an American long-distance runner who competed in the Summer Olympics in 1996 (10th place in marathon) and 2000 (5000m).

Anne Marie Letko is the daughter of Jim and Sandy Letko. She started running at the age of 14 when she accompanied her father on jogs around the block. Letko claims that she became hooked on running after winning her age division in the Hampton Classic 7-miler. Lynne Lauck, her future mother-in-law, was the overall female winner in the same race. In high school, Letko finished 18th at the 1986 Kinney Cross Country Championships. She was two-time New Jersey State Champion in the indoor 3200 meter run and her mark of 10:39.6 was a state record from 1986 to 2001.

In 1991, Letko won the 10,000 metres at the Summer Universiade in Sheffield, England, in what was a personal best for her at the time of 32:26.87. Her 31:37.26 at the 1993 World Championships in Stuttgart, Germany, was the fourth fastest 10,000 by an American woman. In 1994, Letko won USA 15K Championships at the newly named Gate River Run in Jacksonville, Florida.

Dehydration forced Letko to drop out of her debut marathon - the New York City Marathon - in 1993. She returned the following year, coached by for two-time NYC marathon champion Tom Fleming, to finish third with a time of 2:30:19. Letko qualified for the 1996 Summer Olympics in Atlanta, Georgia, with a third-place finish of 2:31:18 at the United States Olympic women's marathon trials the preceding February in Columbia, South Carolina. She was the top American woman in Atlanta finishing in 10th place with a time of 2:31:30.

Letko won Spokane, Washington's Lilac Bloomsday Run in 1993, Atlanta's historic Peachtree Road Race in 1994, and has competed in San Francisco's Bay to Breakers multiple times, finishing third in 1994, second in 1996, and third in 1998. She is the last American to win the Crim 10 mile race in Flint, Michigan (1994).

A native of Glen Gardner, New Jersey, Letko graduated from North Hunterdon High School in Clinton Township in 1987. In 1992, she earned a B.A. in English from Rutgers University. She competed under the name Anne Marie Lauck after she married Jim Lauck in 1995. Jim Lauck later became a chiropractor. She was previously coached by Alberto Salazar.

== Achievements ==
Year	Competition	Venue	Position	Event	Notes
Representing the United States
1991	Universiade	Sheffield, United Kingdom	1st	10,000 m	32:36.87
1991	World Championships	Tokyo, Japan	—	10,000 m	DNF
1992	World Cup	Havana, Cuba	5th	10,000 m	34:14.18
1993	World Championships	Stuttgart, Germany	8th	10,000 m	31:37.36
1995	World Championships	Gothenburg, Sweden	14th	10,000 m	32:22.54
1996	Olympic Games	Atlanta, United States	10th	Marathon	2:31:30
1998	New York City Marathon	New York City, New York	14th	Marathon	2:42:52
1999	World Championships	Sevilla, Spain	16th	10,000 m	32:57.07
1999	Philadelphia Marathon	Philadelphia, Pennsylvania	1st	Marathon	2:37:59
2000	Olympic Games	Sydney, Australia	32nd (h)	5000 m	15:47.78
