= Roseli Machado =

Brazilian long-distance runner (1968–2021)

Personal information
- Full name: Roseli Aparecida Machado
- Born: 27 December 1968 Coronel Macedo, São Paulo, Brazil
- Died: 8 April 2021 (aged 52) Curitiba, Paraná, Brazil

Sport
- Sport: Long-distance running
- Event: 5000 metres

Roseli Aparecida Machado (27 December 1968 – 8 April 2021) was a Brazilian long-distance runner.

== Biography ==
She finished 26th at the 1994 World Cross Country Championships, 48th at the 1995 World Cross Country Championships and 7th at the 1995 New York Marathon. She competed in the women's 5000 metres at the 1996 Summer Olympics, but did not progress from the heats. At the end of this year, she won the women's event at the Saint Silvester Road Race.

She died from COVID-19 in Curitiba on 8 April 2021, at the age of 52.
