= Sonia Maccioni =

Italian athletics competitor

Personal information
- Nationality: Italian
- Born: 5 March 1966 (age 60) Sesto San Giovanni

Sport
- Country: Italy
- Sport: Athletics
- Event: Marathon
- Club: Fiat Sud Formia

Achievements and titles
- Personal bests: Half marathon: 1:12:04 (1997); Marathon: 2:28:54 (1999)
Medal record
World Half Marathon Championships
Bronze medal – third place	1996 Palma de Mallorca	Team
International Marathons
Event / 1st / 2nd / 3rd; Venice Marathon / 1 / 0 / 0

Sonia Maccioni (born 5 March 1966) is an Italian female retired marathon runner, which participated at the 1997 World Championships in Athletics.

== Biography ==
She won an edition of Venice Marathon in 1999.

== Achievements ==
Year	Competition	Venue	Position	Event	Time	Notes
1997	World Championships	(Greece) Athens	DNF	Marathon	NM	
