= 1997 World Championships in Athletics – Women's marathon =

The Women's Marathon at the 1997 World Championships in Athens, Greece, was held on Saturday August 9, 1997, with the start at 08:05h local time.

== Medalists ==
Gold	Hiromi Suzuki; Japan (JPN)
Silver	Manuela Machado; Portugal (POR)
Bronze	Lidia Șimon; Romania (ROM)

== Records ==
Standing records prior to the 1997 World Athletics Championships
World record	Ingrid Kristiansen	Norway	2:21:06	April 21, 1985	London, United Kingdom
Championships record	Rosa Mota	Portugal	2:25:17	August 29, 1987	Rome, Italy
Season best	Tegla Loroupe	Kenya	2:22:07	April 20, 1997	Rotterdam, Netherlands

== Final ranking ==
Rank	Athlete	Country	Time	Note
1st place, gold medalist(s)	Hiromi Suzuki	Japan	2:29:48	
2nd place, silver medalist(s)	Manuela Machado	Portugal	2:31:12	
3rd place, bronze medalist(s)	Lidia Șimon	Romania	2:31:55	
4	Takako Tobise	Japan	2:32:18	
5	Ornella Ferrara	Italy	2:33:10	
6	Iris Biba	Germany	2:34:06	
7	Sonja Krolik	Germany	2:35:28	
8	Franziska Rochat-Moser	Switzerland	2:36:16	
9	Yelena Razdrogina	Russia	2:36:37	
10	Nobuko Fujimura	Japan	2:36:51	
11	Anuța Cătună	Romania	2:38:38	
12	Maria Polyzou	Greece	2:39:10	
13	Franca Fiacconi	Italy	2:39:53	
14	Christine Mallo	France	2:40:55	
15	Elfenesh Alemu	Ethiopia	2:41:00	
16	Grete Kirkeberg	Norway	2:41:05	
17	Maryse Le Gallo	France	2:41:08	
18	Aurica Buia	Romania	2:41:45	
19	Mariko Hara	Japan	2:42:00	
20	Heather Turland	Australia	2:42:12	
21	Rocío Ríos	Spain	2:42:18	
22	Judit Földing-Nagy	Hungary	2:42:21	
23	Angharad Mair	Great Britain & N.I.	2:42:31	
24	Laura Fogli	Italy	2:43:28	
25	Cheryl Collins	United States	2:43:42	
26	Olga Yudenkova	Belarus	2:43:47	
27	Anna Villani	Italy	2:43:58	
28	Sally Goldsmith	Great Britain & N.I.	2:44:20	
29	Tomoe Abe	Japan	2:45:19	
30	Nuţa Olaru	Romania	2:47:12	
31	Elena Vinitskaya	Belarus	2:47:57	
32	Manuela Veith	Germany	2:48:45	
33	Asselefech Assefa	Ethiopia	2:48:54	
34	Evelyne Mura	France	2:48:57	
35	Danielle Sanderson	Great Britain & N.I.	2:49:03	
36	Julia Kirtland	United States	2:49:43	
37	Anfisa Kosacheva	Russia	2:50:29	
38	Grace de Oliveira	South Africa	2:50:36	
39	Gaëlle Houitte	France	2:50:38	
40	Jeanne Peterson	United States	2:51:59	
41	Irina Timofeyeva	Russia	2:53:01	
42	Panayota Nikolakopoulou	Greece	2:54:03	
43	Lo Man Yi	Hong Kong	2:54:59	
44	Alemitu Bekele	Ethiopia	2:55:06	
45	Georgia Ambatzidou	Greece	2:56:58	
46	Marisol Vargas	Mexico	2:58:22	
47	Carolyn Hunter-Rowe	Great Britain & N.I.	3:01:01	
48	May Allison	Canada	3:01:26	
49	Danuta Bartoszek	Canada	3:01:30	
50	Rita Toto	South Africa	3:04:05	
51	Rosa Salinas	Mexico	3:12:55	
52	Gina Liseth Coello	Honduras	3:17:33	
53	Alexandra De Snoo	Aruba	3:22:08	
54	Gulsara Dadabayeva	Tajikistan	3:30:45	
—	Gadisay Edato	Ethiopia	DNF	
—	Fatuma Roba	Ethiopia	DNF	
—	Jane Salumäe	Estonia	DNF	
—	Alina Tecuta	Romania	DNF	
—	Sonia Maccioni	Italy	DNF	
—	Birgit Jerschabek	Germany	DNF	
—	Rosa Oliveira	Portugal	DNF	
—	Galina Baruk	Belarus	DNF	
—	Alena Mazouka	Belarus	DNF	
—	Alina Ivanova	Russia	DNF	
—	Nicole Carroll	Australia	DNF	
—	Anita Håkenstad	Norway	DNF	
—	Josette Colomb-Janin	France	DNF	
—	Mary Alico	United States	DNF	
—	Patty Valadka	United States	DNF	
—	Maria Elena Reyna	Mexico	DNF	
—	Lucia Rendon	Mexico	DNF	
—	Flor Venegas	Chile	DNF	
—	Paraskevi Kastriti	Greece	DNF	
—	Chrisoula Souma	Greece	DNF	

== See also ==
- Women's Olympic Marathon (1996)
- 1997 World Marathon Cup
