= 1996 Berlin Marathon =

Road running event in Berlin, Germany

23rd Berlin Marathon
- Venue: Berlin, Germany
- Dates: 29 September 1996

Champions
- Men: Abel Antón (2:09:15)
- Women: Colleen De Reuck (2:26:35)

The 1996 Berlin Marathon was the 23rd running of the annual marathon race held in Berlin, Germany, held on 29 September 1996. Spain's Abel Antón won the men's race in 2:09:15 hours, while the women's race was won by South Africa's Colleen De Reuck in 2:26:35.

== Results ==
=== Men ===
Position	Athlete	Nationality	Time
1	Abel Antón	Spain	2:09:15
2	Francis Robert Naali	Tanzania	2:09:33
3	Sammy Lelei	Kenya	2:09:49
4	Gilbert Rutto	Kenya	2:10:01
5	Martin Ndivheni	South Africa	2:10:18
6	Samson Maritim	Kenya	2:11:19
7	Paul Yego	Kenya	2:11:22
8	Osmiro Silva	Brazil	2:11:59
9	Philippe Remond	France	2:12:05
10	Éder Fialho	Brazil	2:13:01

=== Women ===
Position	Athlete	Nationality	Time
1	Colleen De Reuck	South Africa	2:26:35
2	Renata Kokowska	Poland	2:27:41
3	Marleen Renders	Belgium	2:27:42
4	Claudia Lokar	Germany	2:28:17
5	Judit Földing-Nagy	Hungary	2:28:50
6	Iris Biba	Germany	2:29:08
7	Anita Håkenstad	Norway	2:30:08
8	Rosa Oliveira	Portugal	2:31:05
9	Kirsi Mattila	Finland	2:31:54
10	Marina Belyayeva	Russia	2:34:19
