= Nobuko Fujimura =

Japanese long-distance runner (born 1965)

Medal record

Women's athletics

Representing Japan

Asian Games
Bronze medal – third place	1994 Hiroshima	Marathon

Nobuko Fujimura (Japanese: 藤村 信子; born 18 December 1965) is a Japanese female former long-distance runner who competed in the marathon. She won the Hokkaido Marathon in 1993 and the Tokyo Women's Marathon in 1996. She represented her country at the World Championships in Athletics (1997), IAAF World Cross Country Championships (1994), and was a bronze medallist at the 1994 Asian Games.

== Career ==
Born in Kameoka, she attended Kyoto Prefectural Minamidan High School and took up running there, initially doing the 400 metres. She moved up to longer distances after she began studying at Osaka University of Health and Sport Sciences. Following her graduation she joined the Tsugumichi Suzuki-led Daihatsu corporate running team.

Her running professional career began in earnest in her mid-twenties. She ranked in the top ten at the Gold Coast Half Marathon in 1991 and 1992. The 1993 season marked a breakthrough, as she took fourth at the high-profile Osaka Women's Marathon with a personal best of 2:30:02 hours before winning the Hokkaido Marathon. She returned an improved runner to Osaka the next year and knocked nearly four minutes from her best with a time of 2:26:09 to place second behind Tomoe Abe. She was chosen for two international teams that year, first at the 1994 IAAF World Cross Country Championships, where she placed in the top 100 in the women's race, and then in the marathon at the 1994 Asian Games, where she claimed the bronze medal behind Chinese opposition.

Her 1995 was highlighted by her first marathon on foreign soil, and she finished in third at the Paris race. An attempt to gain selection for the 1996 Atlanta Olympics failed as he was eighth at the Osaka Marathon, where performances were used by the national selectors. Despite this disappointment, the season proved to be a career high as she finished third at the 1996 Boston Marathon, and won the Tokyo Women's Marathon in 2:28:58 hours, which was also the national championship race. Fujimura was chosen to represent Japan at the 1997 World Championships in Athletics and her tenth-place finish, combined with the performances of winner Hiromi Suzuki and fourth-placer Takako Tobise, led the Japanese women to the title at the 1997 World Marathon Cup.

Fujimura's career quickly tailed off after the 1997 season. She was 15th at the Osaka Marathon in 1998 and was close to the 3-hour mark at the Naha Marathon the next year. Her last outings at major races were 33rd in Tokyo in 2002 and a DNF at the 2003 Osaka Marathon. Following the end of her professional running career, she became a physical education teacher at Fuchu Nuran High School, coaching track and field. She later moved to Nankan High School and also served on Ritsumeikan University coaching staff.

== International competitions ==
Year	Competition	Venue	Position	Event	Notes
1994	World Cross Country Championships	Budapest, Hungary	94th	Senior race	22:24
1994	World Cross Country Championships	Budapest, Hungary	8th	Team	134 pts
1994	Asian Games	Hiroshima, Japan	3rd	Marathon	2:37:03
1997	World Championships	Athens, Greece	10th	Marathon	2:36:51
1997	World Marathon Cup	Athens, Greece	1st	Team	7:38:57

== National titles ==
- Japan Marathon Championships: 1996
