= Athletics at the 1987 Summer Universiade – Women's 10,000 metres =

The women's 10,000 metres event at the 1987 Summer Universiade was held at the Stadion Maksimir in Zagreb on 14 July 1987.

The winning margin was 0.33 seconds which as of 2024 remains the only time the women's 10,000 metres has been won by less than half a second at these games.

== Results ==
Rank	Athlete	Nationality	Time	Notes
1st place, gold medalist(s)	Patty Murray	USA	33:11.26	
2nd place, silver medalist(s)	Zhong Huandi	China	33:11.59	
3rd place, bronze medalist(s)	Yelena Uskova	Soviet Union	33:14.71	
4	Elena Murgoci	Romania	33:30.27	
5	Ellen Lyons	United States	34:03.44	
6	Irina Yagodina	Soviet Union	34:05.96	
7	Marguerite Buist	New Zealand	34:08.27	
8	Maria-Luisa Servin	Mexico	34:32.38	
9	Yolanda Quimbita	Ecuador	35:20.44	
10	Mara Mićanović	Yugoslavia	35:32.22	
	Dimitra Papaspirou	Greece	DNF	
	Astrid Schmidt	West Germany	DNS	
