= Ren Xiujuan =

Chinese long-distance runner

Ren Xiujuan (Chinese: 任秀娟; pinyin: Rén Xiùjuān; born September 14, 1974, in Dalian, Liaoning) is a female Chinese long-distance runner who specialized in the marathon. She represented her country twice in the Olympic marathon, having her best placing of ninth in 1996. She also ranked fifth in the 10,000 metres at the 1997 World Championships in Athletics. She won a global title at the 1996 IAAF World Half Marathon Championships, becoming the first Asian person to win that event.

She won the 1995 Beijing Marathon in a time of 2:30:00 and repeated that feat in 1996, improving to 2:27:13 hours. Her final race in Beijing came in 2001, when she placed third in 2:24:22 hours – a personal best.

== International competitions ==
Year	Competition	Venue	Position	Event	Notes
Representing China
1996	Olympic Games	Atlanta, United States	9th	Marathon	2:31:21
1996	World Half Marathon Championships	Palma, Spain	1st	Half marathon	1:10:39
1997	World Championships	Athens, Greece	5th	10,000 m	31:50.63
2000	Olympic Games	Sydney, Australia	10th	Marathon	2:27:55

== Personal bests ==
- 5000 metres - 15:49.90 min (2000)
- 10,000 metres - 31:13.21 min (1996)
- Marathon - 2:24:22 hrs (2001)
