= Isabel Juárez =

Mexican runner

Personal information
- Born: 10 September 1966 (age 60)

Sport
- Sport: Track and field
Medal record
Representing Mexico
Central American and Caribbean Games
Gold medal – first place	1993 Ponce	3000m
Silver medal – second place	1993 Ponce	1500m

Isabel Juárez (born 10 September 1966) is a Mexican long-distance runner.

In the 1500 metres, she won the silver medal at the 1993 Central American and Caribbean Games as well as the gold medals at the 1993 and 1999 Central American and Caribbean Championships.

In the 3000 metres, she finished eighth at the 1987 Pan American Games, won the gold medal at the 1993 Central American and Caribbean Games and another gold medal at the 1993 Central American and Caribbean Championships.

In the 10,000 metres, she won the gold medal at the 1987 Central American and Caribbean Championships, finished 20th at the 1993 World Championships and won the silver medal at the 2000 Ibero-American Championships.

In road and cross-country races, she participated in the 1993 and 1994 World Cross Country Championships as well as the marathon race at the 2003 Pan American Games.
