= Kate Fonshell =

American long-distance runner

Personal information
- Full name: Katherine Fonshell
- Nationality: American
- Born: October 10, 1969 (age 57)

Sport
- Sport: Long-distance running
- Event: 10,000 metres

Katherine Fonshell (born October 10, 1969) is an American long-distance runner. She competed in the women's 10,000 metres at the 1996 Summer Olympics. She competed in track and cross country at Villanova University.
