= Serap Aktaş =

Turkish runner

Personal information
- Nationality: Turkey
- Born: September 25, 1971 (age 55)
- Height: 1.63 m (5.3 ft)
- Weight: 46 kg (101 lb)

Sport
- Sport: Long-distance
- Club: Fenerbahçe Spor Kulübü
- Coached by: Neşe ÇETİN

Achievements and titles
- Personal bests: 1500 m 4:20.90 (1994)NR; 1 mile 4:49.43 (1994) NR; 3000 m 9:07.04 (1994)NR; 5000 m 15:53.76 (1995) NR; 10000 m 32:59.76 (1994) NR; Half marathon 1:13:17 (1997) NR; Marathon 2:31:43 (1999)NR
Medal record
Women's athletics
Representing Turkey
Marathons
Gold medal – first place	1994 Istanbul	Marathon
Mediterranean Games
Gold medal – first place	1997 Bari	Marathon
Silver medal – second place	2001 Tunis	Marathon

Serap Aktaş (born September 25, 1971, in Ceyhan, Turkey) is a Turkish female middle and long-distance runner, who later specialized in marathon. She holds various Turkish records.

In 1994, she finished the Istanbul Marathon first in the women's category, an achievement not reached yet by any other Turkish female athlete. She won the gold medal in women's marathon at the 1997 Mediterranean Games held in Bari, Italy. Serap Aktaş represented Turkey at the 1996 Summer Olympics in Atlanta, United States and 2000 Summer Olympics in Sydney, Australia in marathon finishing 23rd and 37th respectively.

== Achievements ==
- All results regarding marathon, unless stated otherwise

Year	Competition	Venue	Position	Event	Notes
Representing Turkey
1994	European Championships	Helsinki, Finland	24th (h)	3000m	9:07.04
1994	European Championships	Helsinki, Finland	17th	10,000m	32:59.76
1994	Istanbul Marathon	Istanbul, Turkey	1st	Marathon	2:46:42
1996	Olympic Games	Atlanta, United States	23rd	Marathon	2:36:14
1997	Mediterranean Games	Bari, Italy	1st	Marathon	2:39:22
2000	Olympic Games	Sydney, Australia	37th	Marathon	2:42:40
2001	Mediterranean Games	Tunis, Tunisia	2nd	Marathon	2:43:18

=== Personal bests ===
- 1500 m 4:20.90 (1994) NR
- 1 mile 4:49.43 (1994) NR
- 3000 m 9:07.04 (1994) NR
- 5000 m 15:53.76 (1995) NR
- 10000 m 32:59.76 (1994) NR
- Half marathon 1:13:17 (1997) NR
- Marathon 2:31:43 (1999) NR
- NR - National record
