= Päivi Tikkanen =

Finnish long-distance runner

Päivi Marja Sinikka Tikkanen (née Kunttu; born 19 January 1960 in Savitaipale) is a retired female long-distance runner from Finland, who won the 1989 edition of the Berlin Marathon. A two-time Olympian (1988 and 1992) she ended up in fourth place in the women's 3,000 metres at the 1991 World Championships. Tikkanen was Finnish champion in the same event for ten years in a row (1985–1994). She was coached by her husband Esa Tikkanen.

== Achievements ==
Year	Competition	Venue	Position	Event	Notes
Representing Finland
1989	Berlin Marathon	Berlin, West Germany	1st	Marathon	2:28:45
1990	European Championships	Split, Yugoslavia	6th	3000m	8:50.26
1990	European Championships	Split, Yugoslavia	—	10,000m	DNF
1991	World Championships	Tokyo, Japan	4th	3000 m	8:41.30
1991	World Championships	Tokyo, Japan	DNF	10,000 m	32:06.67 (heats)
1992	Olympic Games	Barcelona, Spain	21st (h)	3000 m	8:59.60
1992	Olympic Games	Barcelona, Spain	DNF (h)	10,000 m	—
1992	World Half Marathon Championships	Newcastle, United Kingdom	13th	Half marathon	1:11:22
1993	World Championships	Stuttgart, Germany	DNF	10,000 m	32:51.72 (heats)
1994	European Championships	Helsinki, Finland	14th	3000m	9:06.93
1994	European Championships	Helsinki, Finland	20th	10,000m	34:22.45

== Personal bests ==
- 800m 2:06.17 (Varkaus 23.7.1989)
- 1500m 4:08.46 (Tuusula 22.8.1989)
- Mile 4:34.91 (Lohja 8.9.1985)
- 3000m 8:41.30 (Tokyo 26.8.1991)
- 5000m 15:15.76 (Lohja 27.8.1989)
- 10000m 31:45.02 (Helsinki 39.6.1992)
- 10 km road 33:27 (Jakarta 23.1.1993)
- 15 km road 52:56 (Adelaide 23.3.1986)
- Half marathon 1:10:35 (Stockholm 3.9.1994)
- Marathon 2:28:45 (Berlin Marathon 1.10.1989)
