= Silvia Sommaggio =

Italian long-distance runner

Personal information
- Nationality: Italian
- Born: November 20, 1969 (age 56) Camposampiero, Italy
- Height: 1.70 m (5 ft 7 in)
- Weight: 59 kg (130 lb)

Sport
- Country: Italy
- Sport: Athletics
- Event: Long distance running
- Club: Snam Gas Metano

Achievements and titles
- Personal bests: 5000 m: 15:20.89 (1995); 10000 m: 31:24.12 (2000)
Medal record
Event	1st	2nd	3rd
Summer Universiade	0	1	0
Mediterranean Games	0	1	0

Silvia Sommaggio (born 20 November 1969) is a retired Italian long-distance runner who specializes in the 5000 and 10,000 metres as well as cross-country and road running.

== Biography ==
She was born in Camposampiero. Her father was Gianfranco Sommaggio, the Italian champion in 3000 metres steeplechase in 1961 and 1962. She became Italian 5000 metres champion in 1995 and 10,000 metres champion in 1997 and 2000, as well as an indoor champion in the 3000 metres in 2000.

In the 5000 metres she competed at the 1995 World Championships and the 1996 Olympic Games without reaching the final, and won the silver medal at the 1995 Summer Universiade in Fukuoka. In the 10,000 metres she competed at the 1996 Olympic Games without reaching the final, before winning the silver medal at the 1997 Mediterranean Games. She also finished ninth at the 1997 World Championships in Athens and fourth at the 2001 Mediterranean Games. In her third Olympic race, the 2000 Olympic 10,000 metres, she again failed to reach the final. In the 3000 metres she competed at the 1994 European Championships and at the 2000 European Indoor Championships without reaching the final.

Sommaggio also competed in cross-country and road races. Her best finish at the World Cross Country Championships was 31st in 2000. She finished 28th at the 2001 World Half Marathon Championships, 36th at the 2002 World Half Marathon Championships and 30th at the 2006 World Road Running Championships.

In the 3000 metres her personal best time was 8:59.18 minutes (indoor), achieved in August 1975 in Nice; in the 5000 metres she had 15:20.89 minutes, achieved at the 1995 World Championships; and in the 10,000 metres she had 31:24.12 minutes, achieved in August 2000 in Heusden. In the half marathon she had 1:12:14 hours, achieved at the 2001 World Half Marathon Championships; and in the marathon she has 2:36:29 hours, achieved in April 2005 in Padua.

== Achievements ==
Year	Competition	Venue	Position	Event	Notes
Representing Italy
1994	European Championships	Helsinki, Finland	19th (h)	3000m	8:59.58
1995	Italian Athletics Championships	Cesenatico, Italy	1st	5000 m	15:44.99
1995	World Student Games	Fukuoka, Japan	2nd	5000 m	15:34.32
1997	Mediterranean Games	Bari, Italy	2nd	10,000 m	32:41.79
1997	World Championships	Athens, Greece	9th	10,000 m	32:16.92
2001	Mediterranean Games	Tunis, Tunisia	4th	10,000 m	33:08.18

== See also ==
- Italian all-time lists - 5000 metres
- Italian all-time lists - 10000 metres
