= Carmem de Oliveira =

Brazilian long-distance runner

Personal information
- Born: 17 August 1965 (age 60) Sobradinho, Federal District, Brazil

Sport
- Sport: Track and field
Medal record
Representing Brazil
Pan American Games
Gold medal – first place	1995 Mar del Plata	10,000m

Carmem Sousa de Oliveira Furtado (born 17 August 1965) is a retired Brazilian long-distance runner.

She finished eleventh in the 10,000 metres at the 1993 World Championships in a new South American record time of 31:47.76 minutes. She also holds the South American record in 5000 metres with 15:22.01 minutes and in the marathon with 2:27:41 hours from the 1994 Boston Marathon. She also won the 15 km (Saint Silvester Road Race in São Paulo) in 1995.

Oliveira also has two cross country titles to her name, having won the South American Cross Country Championships in 1992 and 1994.

== Achievements ==
Year	Competition	Venue	Position	Event	Notes
Representing Brazil
1985	South American Championships	Santiago, Chile	2nd	3000 m	9:30.37
1985	South American Championships	Santiago, Chile	2nd	10,000 m	34:47.02
1987	Pan American Games	Indianapolis, United States	5th	10,000 m	34:24.63
1989	South American Championships	Medellín, Colombia	1st	3000 m	9:22.58
1989	South American Championships	Medellín, Colombia	1st	10,000 m	35:08.5
1991	South American Championships	Manaus, Brazil	1st	3000 m	9:17.50
1991	South American Championships	Manaus, Brazil	1st	10,000 m	33:27.85
1991	Universiade	Sheffield, United Kingdom	19th	3000 m	9:34.44
1991	Universiade	Sheffield, United Kingdom	5th	10,000 m	32:44.89
1992	Ibero-American Championships	Seville, Spain	1st	3000 m	9:20.83
1992	Ibero-American Championships	Seville, Spain	1st	10,000 m	33:21.00
1992	Olympic Games	Barcelona, Spain	41st (h)	10,000 m	34:48.21
1993	South American Championships	Lima, Peru	1st	10,000 m	33:49.8
1995	Pan American Games	Mar del Plata, Argentina	1st	10,000 m	33:10.19
1995	South American Championships	Manaus, Brazil	1st	10,000 m	33:55.84
1996	Olympic Games	Atlanta, United States	—	Marathon	DNF
