= Julia Vaquero =

Spanish long-distance runner

Personal information
- Full name: Julia Vaquero Sousa
- Born: 18 September 1970 (age 56) Chamonix, France

Sport
- Country: Spain
- Sport: Athletics
Medal record
Representing Spain
Mediterranean Games
Silver medal – second place	1993 Narbonne	3000 m
Bronze medal – third place	1997 Bari	5000 m

Julia Vaquero Sousa (Note: In this Spanish name, the first or paternal surname is Vaquero and the second or maternal family name is Sousa.) (born 18 September 1970) is a Spanish retired athlete who competed in the long-distance events. She represented her country at the 1996 Summer Olympics, as well as four World Championships.

Although born in France, at the age of two months she returned to her native A Guarda in Galicia. She is considered one of the best Galician athletes of all time.

== Competition record ==
Year	Competition	Venue	Position	Event	Notes
Representing Spain
1988	World Junior Championships	Sudbury, Canada	15th (h)	1500 m	4:34.01
1989	European Junior Championships	Varaždin, Yugoslavia	7th	3000 m	9:26.45
1990	Ibero-American Championships	Manaus, Brazil	2nd	3000 m	9:12.87
1991	Universiade	Sheffield, United Kingdom	7th	3000 m	9:08.45
1991	World Championships	Tokyo, Japan	14th (h)	3000 m	8:58.90
1993	Mediterranean Games	Narbonne, France	3rd	3000 m	9:04.99
1993	Universiade	Buffalo, United States	4th	3000 m	9:06.25
1993	World Championships	Stuttgart, Germany	27th (h)	3000 m	9:05.50
1994	European Championships	Helsinki, Finland	26th (h)	3000 m	9:11.76
1996	Olympic Games	Atlanta, United States	9th	10,000 m	31:27.07
1997	Mediterranean Games	Bari, Italy	2nd	5000 m	15:04.48
1997	World Championships	Athens, Greece	12th	10,000 m	32:36.91
1998	European Championships	Budapest, Hungary	6th	10,000 m	31:46.47
1998	World Half Marathon Championships	Uster, Switzerland	7th	Half marathon	1:10:33
1999	World Championships	Seville, Spain	6th	5000 m	14:56.00

== Personal bests ==
- 800 metres – 2:09.74 (1989)
- 1500 metres – 4:17.37 (Segovia 1992)
- 2000 metres – 5:47.81 (Nice 1996) NR
- 3000 metres – 8:41.23 (Nice 1996)
- 5000 metres – 14:44.95 (Oslo 1996) NR
- 10,000 metres – 31:14.51 (Barakaldo 1997)
- 15 kilometres – 49:33+ (Uster 1998) NR
- 20 kilometres – 1:06:43+ (Uster 1998) NR
- Half marathon – 1:10:33 (Uster 1998)
