= Johannes Maremane =

South African long-distance runner

Personal information
- Nationality: South African
- Born: 27 September 1965 (age 60) Polokwane, South Africa

Sport
- Sport: Long-distance running
- Event: Marathon

Johannes Maremane (born 27 September 1965) is a South African long-distance runner. He competed in the men's marathon at the 2000 Summer Olympics.
