= Sally Barsosio =

Kenyan runner

Personal information
- Born: 21 March 1978 (age 48)
Medal record
Women's athletics
Representing Kenya
World Championships
Gold medal – first place	1997 Athens	10,000 m
Bronze medal – third place	1993 Stuttgart	10,000 m
African Championships
Silver medal – second place	1998 Dakar	5000 m

Sally Barsosio (born 21 March 1978 in Keiyo District) is a Kenyan distance runner. As of 2015, Barsosio is the youngest ever medallist at the World Junior Championships in Athletics, at 14 years and 182 days.

== Career ==
In 1993, aged 15 years 153 days, she won the 10,000 metres bronze medal at the 1993 World Championships in Athletics after initially being disqualified for impeding fellow runners, most notably Elana Meyer who rather dramatically dropped out of the race. This made her the youngest ever person to win a medal at the World Championships in Athletics.

She was the winner of the inaugural Cross Internacional de Soria meeting in 1994.

Sally returned to the world championships in 1995 taking 11th place and in 1997 when she won the 10,000m gold medal, becoming the first Kenyan woman to win a senior track title. Adding to her position as the youngest medallist, this win made her the youngest ever champion of the 10,000 m.

She trains with PACE Sports Management and is coached by Ricky Simms.

Her sisters Florence Barsosio and Chepkemoi Barsosio and her cousin Susan Sirma are also Kenyan runners.
