= Yang Siju =

Chinese long-distance runner

Yang Siju (Chinese: 杨思菊, born 19 April 1973 in Qushi 曲石, Tengchong County, Yunnan) is a Chinese long-distance runner who specialized in the 10,000 metres.

She finished seventh at the 1997 World Championships in Athens in a time of 32:01.61 minutes.

Her personal best time was 31:16.39 minutes, achieved in October 1997 in Shanghai.

== Achievements ==
Year	Tournament	Venue	Result	Event
1996	Olympic Games	Atlanta, United States	20th	5,000 m
1996	Olympic Games	Atlanta, United States	19th	10,000 m
1997	World Championships	Athens, Greece	7th	10,000 m
