= Colleen De Reuck =

South African born American long-distance runner

Personal information
- Full name: Colleen Stella De Reuck
- Nationality: South Africa; United States
- Born: 13 April 1964 (age 62) Vryheid, KwaZulu-Natal
- Height: 1.66 m (5 ft 5 in)

Sport
- Sport: Athletics
- Event: Long-distance running

Achievements and titles
- Olympic finals: 1992; Marathon, 9th 1996; 10,000 m, 13th 2000; Marathon, 31st 2004; Marathon, 39th
Medal record
Women's athletics
World Marathon Majors
Gold medal – first place	1996 Berlin	Marathon
Silver medal – second place	1997 New York	Marathon
Silver medal – second place	1998 Chicago	Marathon
Bronze medal – third place	1997 Boston	Marathon

Colleen S. De Reuck (born 1964 in Vryheid, Kwazulu-Natal) is a long-distance runner from South Africa, who became an American citizen on 11 December 2000. She has had a long-lasting career and made a total of four appearances at the Summer Olympics, and finished in the top eight places at 11 World Marathon Majors.

She was a late bloomer and her first major success came in 1995 and 1996, when she won the Honolulu Marathon and the Berlin Marathon. Despite numerous appearances in the Summer Olympics and the IAAF World Championships in Athletics, medals never came on the track. By virtue of winning the Olympic Trials, she was also the 2004 United States National Champion in the Marathon. Just ten days short of moving into the Masters division, she broke the 16-year-old Trials record, and defeated eventually Olympic bronze medalist, Deena Kastor in the process.

After her transfer to compete for the United States in 2000 she won her first major world medals, taking the individual bronze and team silver at the 2002 IAAF World Cross Country Championships. Another team bronze came at the following year's championships and she won at the 2004 and 2005 USA Cross Country Championships.

She continues to run and finished third at the Houston Half Marathon in 2009, finishing in 1:12:14.

== Career ==
=== South Africa ===
De Reuck began competing for South Africa and made her first Olympic appearance at the 1992 Barcelona Games, where she finished ninth in the marathon race. She tried her hand at the half marathon, resulting in a win at the City-Pier-City Loop in 1993 and a fourth-place finish at the 1995 IAAF World Half Marathon Championships. She also won the Honolulu Marathon that year with a time of 2:37:29. In 1996 she won the Lilac Bloomsday Run, the Berlin Marathon, and the Eurocross cross country meeting in Luxembourg. She made her second Olympic appearance in the 10,000 m, taking 13th place at the 1996 Atlanta Olympics.

Her first appearance on the world championships stage came at the 1997 World Championships in Athletics and she finished in eighth in the final of the 10,000 meters. At the 1998 IAAF World Cross Country Championships she finished in 15th overall in the women's long race. Following a missed opportunity at the 1999 World Championships in Athletics, she represented South Africa at the Olympics for the third and final time, but managed on 31st place in the women's marathon with a time of 2:36:58.

=== Switch to United States ===
After making a nationality transfer, De Reuck made her first appearance for "Team USA" at the 2002 World Cross Country Championships in Dublin, Ireland, where she finished third overall (27:17) and helped the United States team to a silver medal. The following year she finished in seventh place at the 2003 World Cross Country Championships, helping the U.S. team to the bronze medal. She made her fourth and final Olympics the 2004 Athens Olympics. She finished in 39th place in the marathon, while U.S. teammate Deena Kastor won the bronze medal.

She won the USA Cross Country Championships twice consecutively in 2004 and 2005. De Reuck represented the United States twice more at the World Cross Country Championships, finishing in 13th place in 2005, and 33rd place at her final competition in 2006 at age 41.

A resident of Boulder, Colorado De Reuck is a former world record holder at 10 miles (51:16, set at the Cherry Blossom Ten Mile Run) and 20 km (1:05:11 New Haven). She was fourth at the 2005 Chicago Marathon in 2:28:40, a masters record for United States.

At the 2009 Boston Marathon at age 45, she finished 8th overall, beating the W40 winner by over a minute and the next competitor in her own division by 14 minutes. Just nine days earlier she had run 2:32:37 at the Twin Cities Marathon in St. Paul, Minnesota beating the listed American W45 record by over 6 minutes.

She ran at the Falmouth Road Race in Massachusetts in August 2010 and took fifth place as the first American past the line. Shortly after she ran in the Copenhagen Marathon in Denmark and placed 1st in 2:30:51, 8 minutes ahead of her nearest opponent.

On 14 January 2012, de Reuck ran in the 2012 US Olympic Team Marathon Trials, finishing in 2:38:52. Her pace was 13:14 behind women's winner Shalane Flanagan. Her time was good for a 35th-place finish out of 152.

Following her elite career de Reuck took up coaching with Boulder Striders as well as personal training. She was inducted into the Boulder (Colorado) Sports Hall of Fame in 2018.

== Achievements ==
Year	Competition	Venue	Position	Event	Notes
Representing South Africa
1992	Olympic Games	Barcelona, Spain	9th	Marathon	2:39:03
1993	City-Pier-City Loop	The Hague, Netherlands	1st	Half Marathon	1:10:50
1995	Honolulu Marathon	Honolulu, Hawaii	1st	Marathon	2:37:29
1996	Olympic Games	Atlanta, United States	13th	10,000 m	32:14.69
1996	Berlin Marathon	Berlin, Germany	1st	Marathon	2:26:35
2000	Olympic Games	Sydney, Australia	31st	Marathon	2:36:48
Representing the United States
2002	World Cross Country Championships	Dublin, Ireland	3rd	Cross	Individual
2002	World Cross Country Championships	Dublin, Ireland	2nd	Cross	Team
2003	World Cross Country Championships	Lausanne, Switzerland	3rd	Cross	Team
2004	Olympic Games	Athens, Greece	39th	Marathon	2:46:30
