= Muriel Linsolas =

French long-distance runner

Personal information
- Nationality: French
- Born: 24 September 1965 (age 60) Avignon

Sport
- Event: distance running

Muriel Linsolas (born 24 September 1965 in Avignon) is a former French athlete, who specialized in the distance races.

== Biography ==
She won the French national title in the 10,000 meters in 1998 and the half-marathon in 1996 and 1997.

In 1996, during the IAAF World Half Marathon Championships at Palma, Spain, she won the silver medal in the team event alongside her compatriots Zahia Dahmani and Christine Mallo.

=== Prize list ===
International Awards
Date	Competition	Location	Result	Event	Performance
1996	Half Marathon World Championships	Palma	2nd	Team	3:38:44

=== Records ===
Personal Bests
Event	Performance	Location	Date
10 000 m	32:57.83		1998
Half-marathon	1:13:33		1996
Marathon	2:36:54		1996

== Sources ==
- DocAthlé 2003 - Fédération française d'athlétisme - p. 417
