= Paul Yego =

Kenyan long-distance runner (born 1968)

Paul Yego (born 25 November 1968) is a Kenyan retired distance and marathon runner. He participated at the World Athletics Half Marathon Championships in 1995 and won a silver medal finishing behind Moses Tanui. He finished fifth in the 1995 Boston Marathon, eighth in the 1996 Boston Marathon, and seventh in the 1996 Berlin Marathon.
