= Zahia Dahmani =

French long-distance runner

Personal information
- Nationality: French
- Born: 2 June 1972 (age 54) Roubaix
- Height: 1.60 m (5 ft 3 in)

Sport
- Event: Cross Country

Zahia Dahmani (born 2 June 1972, in Roubaix) is a former French athlete, who specialized in long-distance running.

Dahmani won the French national title for the half marathon in 2001, the 5000 metres in 1997, the 10,000 metres in 1997 and 1999, and 10K run in 1997 and 2000.

In 1996, during the IAAF World Half Marathon Championships in Palma, Spain, she won the silver medal in the team event alongside her compatriots Christine Mallo and Muriel Linsolas.

At the European Cross Country Championships, she received the team silver medal in 1999 and the bronze team medal in 1996.

== International competitions ==
Year	Competition	Venue	Position	Event	Notes
1996	World Half Marathon Championships	Palma, Spain	2nd	Team	3:38:44

== Personal bests ==
Event	Performance	Location	Date
5000 metres	15:37.98	Saint Petersburg, Russia	29 May 1999
10,000 metres	32:10.21	Reims, France	27 June 1997
Half marathon	1:11:28	Montbéliard, France	1 October 1995
Marathon	2:29:58	Paris, France	8 April 2001
