= Charles Tangus =

Kenyan long-distance runner (born 1974)

Charles Tangus (born 4 June 1974) is a Kenyan distance and marathon runner. He participated at the IAAF World Half Marathon Championships in 1995 and won a bronze medal finishing third behind fellow Kenyan Paul Yego. He won the Berlin Half Marathon in 1996 and finished seventh in the 1996 Boston Marathon.
