= Daria Nauer =

Swiss long-distance runner

Medal record

Women's athletics

Representing Switzerland

European Championships
Bronze medal – third place	1994 Helsinki	10,000 m

Daria Nauer (born 21 May 1966) is a retired Swiss long-distance runner, who won a bronze medal in 10,000 metres at the 1994 European Championships in Helsinki in a Swiss record time of 31:35.96 minutes.

== Achievements ==
Year	Competition	Venue	Position	Event	Notes
Representing Switzerland
1991	World Championships	Tokyo, Japan	23rd (h)	3000 m	9:05.08
1993	World Championships	Stuttgart, Germany	32nd (h)	3000 m	9:11.28
1994	European Championships	Helsinki, Finland	3rd	10,000 m	31:35.96
1996	Olympic Games	Atlanta, United States	30th (h)	10,000 m	33:56.95
2000	Olympic Games	Sydney, Australia	38th	Marathon	2:43:00

(h) Indicates overall position in qualifying heats.
