= María Luisa Servín =

Mexican long-distance runner

Personal information
- Born: August 25, 1962 (age 64)

Sport
- Sport: Track and field
Medal record
Representing Mexico
Pan American Games
Bronze medal – third place	1991 Havana	10,000m
Central American and Caribbean Games
Silver medal – second place	1990 Mexico City	1500m
Silver medal – second place	1990 Mexico City	3000m

María Luisa Servín Ortíz (born August 25, 1962) is a retired female long-distance runner from Mexico. She set her personal best in the women's 10,000 metres event (33:13.70) on August 27, 1991, at the World Championships in Tokyo, Japan.

== Achievements ==
Year	Competition	Venue	Position	Event	Notes
Representing Mexico
1987	Universiade	Zagreb, Yugoslavia	14th	3000 m	9:24.13
1987	Universiade	Zagreb, Yugoslavia	8th	10,000 m	34:32.38
1987	Pan American Games	Indianapolis, United States	8th	10,000 m	36:19.56
1988	Ibero-American Championships	Mexico City, Mexico	5th	3000 m	10:04.09 A
1990	Central American and Caribbean Games	Mexico City, Mexico	2nd	1500 m	4:29.03 A
1990	Central American and Caribbean Games	Mexico City, Mexico	2nd	3000 m	9:38.08 A
1991	Pan American Games	Havana, Cuba	5th	3000 m	9:20.26
1991	Pan American Games	Havana, Cuba	3rd	10,000 m	34:55.94
1991	Central American and Caribbean Championships	Xalapa, Veracruz, Mexico	1st	1,500 m	4:26.98 A
1991	Central American and Caribbean Championships	Xalapa, Veracruz, Mexico	1st	3,000 m	9:28.02 A
1992	Ibero-American Championships	Seville, Spain	7th	1500 m	4:25.08
1992	Ibero-American Championships	Seville, Spain	3rd	3000 m	9:23.71
1992	World Cup	Havana, Cuba	7th	10,000 m	34:55.33
