= Carmen Fuentes =

Spanish long-distance runner

Personal information
- Born: 7 June 1965 (age 61) Atienza, Spain

Sport
- Sport: Marathon running

Carmen Fuentes Yagüe (born 7 June 1965) is a retired Spanish long-distance runner.

She finished eighteenth in 5000 metres at the 1994 European Championships and competed at the 1995 World Championships. She became Spanish champion in the same event in 1995.

Fuentes was also a prolific competitor at the World Cross Country Championships. She finished 21st at the 1995 World Cross Country Championships, and seventh with the Spanish team. In the same year she finished fifteenth at the 1995 World Half Marathon Championships and won a bronze medal with the Spanish team.

Her personal best times were 32:35.62 minutes in the 10,000 metres (1996), 1:12:01 hours in the half marathon (1995) and 2:31:20 hours in the marathon (1995 Rotterdam Marathon).
