= Klara Kashapova =

Russian long-distance runner

Personal information
- Nationality: Russian
- Born: 29 January 1970 (age 55)

Sport
- Sport: Long-distance running
- Event: 10,000 metres

Klara Kashapova (born 29 January 1970) is a Russian long-distance runner. She competed in the women's 10,000 metres at the 1996 Summer Olympics.
