= Giacomo Leone =

Italian long-distance runner

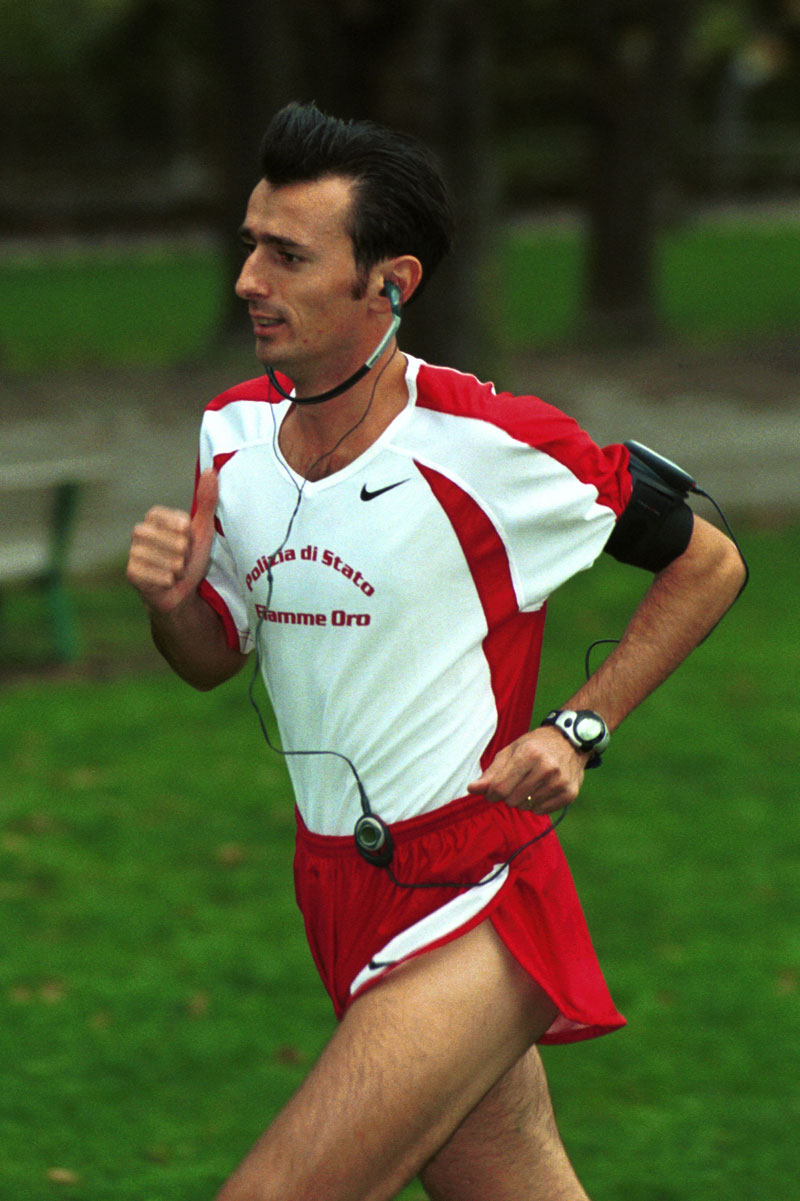

Personal information
- Nationality: Italian
- Born: 10 April 1971 (age 55) Francavilla Fontana, Italy

Sport
- Country: Italy
- Sport: Athletics
- Event: Marathon
- Retired: 1983

Achievements and titles
- Personal best: Marathon: 2:07:52 (2001)
Medal record
World Marathon Cup
Bronze medal – third place	2001 Edmonton	Team
World Half Marathon Championships
Bronze medal – third place	2001 Montbéliard-Belfort	Team
Event	1st	2nd	3rd
New York City Marathon	1	0	0
Rome City Marathon	0	1	0
Lake Biwa Marathon	1	0	0

Giacomo Leone (born 10 April 1971 in Francavilla Fontana, Brindisi) is a retired male long-distance runner from Italy. He set his personal best (2:07:52) in the marathon on 4 March 2001 in Otsu, Japan. Leone is best known for winning the 1996 edition of the New York City Marathon.

== Biography ==
He was the last European to win New York City Marathon, in 1996, before Andreas Almgren won in 2026. In the intervening decades, Africans dominated the event, except for Brazilian victories in 2006 and 2008.

When 18–20 years old he started to run distances over 20 km and in 1989 won the bronze medal in European Athletics Junior Championships (in 1989 edition in Varaždin, on 20 km Road Race); in the next year he places himself at fifth place at Juniores World Championship on the same distance. When he was 20 he debuted in a marathon at Sheffield Universiade.

== Achievements ==
Year	Competition	Venue	Position	Event	Notes
Representing Italy
1990	World Junior Championships	Plovdiv, Bulgaria	5th	20 km road run	1:03:01
1993	Universiade	Buffalo, United States	–	Marathon	DNF
1996	New York City Marathon	New York, United States	1st	Marathon	2:09:54
1997	World Championships	Athens, Greece	7th	Marathon	2:17:16
1998	European Championships	Budapest, Hungary	—	Marathon	DNF
2000	Rome City Marathon	Rome, Italy	2nd	Marathon	2:08:41
2000	Olympic Games	Sydney, Australia	5th	Marathon	2:12:14
2001	Lake Biwa Marathon	Ōtsu, Japan	2nd	Marathon	2:07:52
2001	World Championships	Edmonton, Canada	11th	Marathon	2:17:54
2006	European Championships	Gothenburg, Sweden	—	Marathon	DNF

== See also ==
- Men's marathon Italian record progression
- Italian all-time lists - half marathon
- Italian all-time lists - Marathon
