= Solange de Souza =

Brazilian long-distance runner

Personal information
- Full name: Solange Cordeiro de Souza
- Born: 5 February 1969 (age 57) Brasília, Brazil
- Height: 1.56 m (5 ft 1 in)
- Weight: 43 kg (95 lb)

Sport
- Sport: Long-distance running
- Event: Marathon
- Club: Reebok / Funilense Cosmópolis

Solange Cordeiro de Souza (born 5 February 1969) is a Brazilian long-distance runner. She competed in the women's marathon at the 1996 Summer Olympics.
