= Aurica Buia =

Romanian long-distance runner

Aurica Buia (born February 16, 1970, in Bratovoești, Dolj) is a retired female long-distance runner from Romania, who specialized in the marathon race during her career. She set her personal best (2:31:39) in the women's marathon in Vienna, Austria on April 14, 1996.

== Achievements ==
| Year | Competition | Venue | Position | Event | Notes |
Representing Romania
| 1997 | Vienna Marathon | Vienna, Austria | 1st | Marathon | 2:31:39 |
| 1997 | World Championships | Athens, Greece | 18th | Marathon | 2:41:45 |
| 1998 | European Championships | Budapest, Hungary | 23rd | Marathon | 2:36:55 |
| 2003 | World Championships | Paris, France | 45th | Marathon | 2:30:49 |
| 2005 | World Championships | Helsinki, Finland | 21st | Marathon | 2:33:20 |
