= André Luiz Ramos =

Brazilian long-distance runner

Personal information
- Nationality: Brazilian
- Born: 20 January 1970 (age 56)

Sport
- Sport: Long-distance running
- Event: Marathon

André Luiz Ramos (born 20 January 1970) is a Brazilian long-distance runner. He competed in the men's marathon at the 2004 Summer Olympics.
