= Maria Guida =

Italian long-distance runner

Personal information
- Nationality: Italian
- Born: 23 January 1966 (age 60) Vico Equense, Italy
- Height: 1.60 m (5 ft 3 in)
- Weight: 49 kg (108 lb)

Sport
- Country: Italy
- Sport: Athletics
- Event: Long distance running
- Club: G.S. Forestale

Achievements and titles
- Personal bests: 5000 m: 14:58.84 (1996); 10000 m: 31:27.82 (1995); Marathon: 2:25:57 (1999)
Medal record
Event	1st	2nd	3rd
European Championships	1	0	0

Maria Guida (born 23 January 1966 in Vico Equense) is an Italian former long-distance runner.

== Biography ==
Maria Guida won one important medal, at individual level, at the International athletics competitions (gold medal at the European Championships in the marathon). She participated at one edition of the Summer Olympics (1996), she has 29 caps in national team from 1988 to 2002.

== Personal bests ==
- 3000 metres - 8:54.59 min (1994)
- 5000 metres - 14:58.84 min (1996)
- 10,000 metres - 31:27.82 min (1995)
- Half marathon - 1:09:00 hrs (2000)
- Marathon - 2:25:57 hrs (1999)

== Achievements ==
Year	Competition	Venue	Position	Event	Notes
Representing Italy
1993	World Championships	Stuttgart, Germany	12th	10,000 m	32:15.34
1994	European Championships	Helsinki, Finland	6th	10,000 m	31:42.14
1995	World Championships	Gothenburg, Sweden	4th	10,000 m	31:27.82
1998	World Half Marathon Championships	Uster, Switzerland	15th	Half marathon	1:11:31
1999	Italian Marathon	Carpi, Emilia-Romagna	1st	Marathon	2:25:57
2001	Rome City Marathon	Rome, Italy	1st	Marathon	2:30:42
2002	European Championships	Munich, Germany	1st	Marathon	2:26:05

== National titles ==
She has won 9 times the individual national championship.

- 6 wins in the 10,000 metres (1991, 1993, 1994, 1995, 1996, 2001)
- 3 wins in the half marathon (1994, 1999, 2002)

== See also ==
- FIDAL Hall of Fame
- Italian all-time lists - 5000 metres
- Italian all-time lists - 10000 metres
- Italian all-time lists - Half marathon
- Italian all-time lists - Marathon
