= Hiromi Suzuki (runner) =

Japanese long-distance runner

Hiromi Suzuki (鈴木 博美, Suzuki Hiromi; born December 6, 1968) is a Japanese former long-distance runner. She represented her country at the 1992 and 1996 Summer Olympics. She won the world title in the women's marathon at the 1997 World Championships in Athens, Greece.

== Life ==
Suzuki was born on December 6, 1968, in Chiba.

She was a torchbearer at the 1998 Winter Olympics Opening Ceremonies in Nagano.

She is married to former sprinter Koji Ito.

== Personal bests ==
- 3000 metres — 9:21.92 (01/01/1987)
- 5000 metres — 15:30.43 (25/07/1999)
- 10,000 metres — 31:19.40 (09/06/1996)
- Half Marathon — 1:10:33 (18/07/1999)
- Marathon — 2:26:27 (28/01/1996)
