= 1997 IAAF World Half Marathon Championships =

- Organisers: IAAF
- Edition: 6th
- Date: October 4
- Host city: Košice, Slovakia
- Events: 3
- Participation: 226 athletes from 45 nations

The 6th IAAF World Half Marathon Championships was held on October 4, 1997, in the city of Košice, Slovakia. A total of 228 athletes, 144 men and 84 women, from 45 countries took part. Detailed reports on the event and an appraisal of the results was given.

Complete results were published.

== Medallists ==
Event	Gold		Silver		Bronze	
Individual
Men	Shem Kororia (KEN)	59:56	Moses Tanui (KEN)	59:58	Kenneth Cheruiyot (KEN)	1:00:00
Women	Tegla Loroupe (KEN)	1:08:14	Cristina Pomacu (ROU)	1:08:43	Lidia Șimon (ROU)	1:09:05
Team
Team Men	Kenya	2:59:54	South Africa	3:03:34	Ethiopia	3:03:46
Team Women	Romania	3:27:40	Kenya	3:27:57	Japan	3:31:38

== Race results ==
=== Men's ===
Rank	Athlete	Nationality	Time	Notes
1st place, gold medalist(s)	Shem Kororia	Kenya	59:56	CR
2nd place, silver medalist(s)	Moses Tanui	Kenya	59:58	
3rd place, bronze medalist(s)	Kenneth Cheruiyot	Kenya	1:00:00	
4	Hendrick Ramaala	South Africa	1:00:07	
5	Mohamed Mourhit	Belgium	1:00:18	
6	Gert Thys	South Africa	1:00:23	
7	Abraham Assefa	Ethiopia	1:00:52	
8	Luís Jesús	Portugal	1:00:56	NR
9	Stefano Baldini	Italy	1:01:01	
10	Laban Chege	Kenya	1:01:13	
11	Lemma Alemayehu	Ethiopia	1:01:17	
12	Michael Fietz	Germany	1:01:18	
13	Stéphane Schweickhardt	Switzerland	1:01:26	
14	Eduardo do Nascimento	Brazil	1:01:27	
15	Wilbroad Axweso	Tanzania	1:01:28	
16	Jan Pešava	Czech Republic	1:01:31	
17	Alejandro Gómez	Spain	1:01:36	
18	Tesfaye Tola	Ethiopia	1:01:37	
19	Tendai Chimusasa	Zimbabwe	1:01:42	
20	Jean-Pierre Lautredoux	France	1:01:43	
21	Bartolomé Serrano	Spain	1:01:44	
22	Nicolae Negru	Romania	1:01:45	
23	Osamu Nara	Japan	1:02:06	
24	Abel Chimukoko	Zimbabwe	1:02:07	
25	Herder Vázquez	Colombia	1:02:09	
26	Joshua Chelanga	Kenya	1:02:12	
27	Michele Gamba	Italy	1:02:13	
28	Noriaki Igarashi	Japan	1:02:15	
29	Róbert Štefko	Slovakia	1:02:15	
30	Antonio Peña	Spain	1:02:15	
31	Yoshifumi Miyamoto	Japan	1:02:16	
32	Carlos de la Torre	Spain	1:02:42	
33	Elisvaldo de Carvalho	Brazil	1:02:42	
34	Carlos Grisales	Colombia	1:02:43	
35	Alene Emere	Ethiopia	1:02:44	
36	Antonio Armuzzi	Italy	1:02:46	
37	Imre Berkovics	Hungary	1:02:46	
38	Marco Gielen	Netherlands	1:02:48	
39	José Orlando Sánchez Guerrero	Colombia	1:02:49	
40	Tamás Kliszek	Hungary	1:02:50	
41	Ali Mabrouk El-Zaidi	Libya	1:02:57	
42	Makhosonke Fika	South Africa	1:03:04	
43	Giovanni Ruggiero	Italy	1:03:06	
44	Alcidio Costa	Portugal	1:03:08	
45	Alemayehu Girma	Ethiopia	1:03:08	
46	Fungai Kapanyota	Zimbabwe	1:03:12	
47	Hakim Bagy	France	1:03:14	
48	Ronny Ligneel	Belgium	1:03:14	
49	José Carlos Adán	Spain	1:03:15	
50	Joaquim Pinheiro	Portugal	1:03:18	
51	Zoltán Holba	Hungary	1:03:19	
52	Migidio Bourifa	Italy	1:03:22	
53	David Taylor	Great Britain	1:03:24	
54	Viktor Röthlin	Switzerland	1:03:29	
55	Valeriy Kuzman	Russia	1:03:34	
56	Rainer Huth	Germany	1:03:39	
57	Janko Benša	Yugoslavia	1:03:41	
58	Lee Troop	Australia	1:03:43	
59	João Junqueira	Portugal	1:03:47	
60	Alberto Chaíça	Portugal	1:03:59	
61	Alan Chilton	Great Britain	1:03:59	
62	Aleksandr Kuzin	Ukraine	1:04:06	
63	Pat Carroll	Australia	1:04:09	
64	Pavel Kokin	Russia	1:04:10	
65	Faustin Saktay	Tanzania	1:04:29	
66	Jeffrey Spillane	New Zealand	1:04:31	
67	Jens Karrass	Germany	1:04:34	
68	Anton Nikolesko	Russia	1:04:35	
69	Percy Sephoda	Lesotho	1:04:35	
70	Kokichi Kawamoto	Japan	1:04:36	
71	Jean-Pierre Monciaux	France	1:04:36	
72	Benno Piskur	Slovenia	1:04:41	
73	Petr Pipa	Slovakia	1:04:42	
74	Vladimír Vašek	Czech Republic	1:04:44	
75	Todd Reeser	United States	1:04:45	
76	Wiesław Figurski	Poland	1:04:48	
77	Vladimir Tsyamchik	Belarus	1:04:52	
78	Khomojoo Kapane	Lesotho	1:04:58	
79	Hansjörg Brücker	Switzerland	1:04:59	
80	Glynn Tromans	Great Britain	1:05:00	
81	Darrell General	United States	1:05:10	
82	Mykola Rudyk	Ukraine	1:05:15	
83	Józef Kazanecki	Poland	1:05:23	
84	Miroslav Vanko	Slovakia	1:05:24	
85	Drago Paripović	Croatia	1:05:29	
86	Markus Gerber	Switzerland	1:05:29	
87	Mark Steinle	Great Britain	1:05:36	
88	Ali Awad	Lebanon	1:05:38	
89	Ramiz Taipi	Yugoslavia	1:05:46	
90	Zsolt Bacskai	Hungary	1:05:53	
91	Vladimir Tonchinskiy	Belarus	1:06:02	
92	Jan Bláha	Czech Republic	1:06:14	
93	Daniel Ferreira	Brazil	1:06:15	
94	Robert Petro	Slovakia	1:06:25	
95	Vladimir Gusev	Kyrgyzstan	1:06:30	
96	Ian Hudspith	Great Britain	1:06:35	
97	Boris Batuyev	Belarus	1:06:38	
98	Marek Sukiennik	Poland	1:06:41	
99	Dov Kremer	Israel	1:06:48	
100	Yuriy Gichun	Ukraine	1:06:51	
101	Pavel Faschingbauer	Czech Republic	1:06:51	
102	Eric Morrison	United States	1:06:59	
103	Kopamo Pekile	Lesotho	1:07:04	
104	Sérgio da Silva	Brazil	1:07:10	
105	Neema Tuluway	Tanzania	1:07:13	
106	Amit Neʼeman	Israel	1:07:14	
107	Thabiso Ralekhetla	Lesotho	1:07:17	
108	Leonid Pykhteyev	Kyrgyzstan	1:07:19	
109	Ali Al-Dosari	Bahrain	1:07:19	
110	János Szemán	Hungary	1:07:29	
111	Jos Maes	Belgium	1:07:40	
112	Abdi Djama	France	1:07:44	
113	David Morris	United States	1:07:46	
114	Darius Gruzdys	Lithuania	1:07:48	
115	Robert Sádek	Slovakia	1:07:51	
116	Bogdan Krupa	Ukraine	1:07:54	
117	James Herald	United States	1:08:01	
118	Zarislav Gapeyenko	Belarus	1:08:14	
119	Macbeth Akakwansa	Uganda	1:08:18	
120	Sentso Retere	Lesotho	1:08:27	
121	Abdullah Al-Dosari	Bahrain	1:08:48	
122	Rustam Radjapov	Turkmenistan	1:08:54	
123	Vujadin Alempic	Yugoslavia	1:09:15	
124	Charygeldiy Allaberdiyev	Turkmenistan	1:09:18	
125	Hayk Khojumyan	Armenia	1:09:28	
126	Islam Dugum	Bosnia and Herzegovina	1:09:51	
127	Hidajet Bulic	Bosnia and Herzegovina	1:09:51	
128	Hsu Gi-Sheng	Chinese Taipei	1:09:56	
129	Mehdi Chebli	Lebanon	1:10:03	
130	Robert Prejnjak	Croatia	1:10:04	
131	Adra Mocha	Israel	1:10:28	
132	Ivica Škopac	Croatia	1:11:36	
133	Željko-Franjo Letonija	Croatia	1:12:15	
134	Dovletmomed Nazarov	Turkmenistan	1:12:18	
135	Hussein Awada	Lebanon	1:14:03	
136	Kaido Koppel	Estonia	1:16:35	
137	Jacques Diab	Lebanon	1:18:11	
138	Aleksandr Levdanskiy	Kyrgyzstan	1:19:23	
—	Sead Kondo	Bosnia and Herzegovina	DNF	
—	Tomix da Costa	Brazil	DNF	
—	Josip Lacković	Croatia	DNF	
—	Cyrille Ballester	France	DNF	
—	Adam Motlagale	South Africa	DNF	
—	Panayiotis Karimalis	Greece	DNS	

=== Women's ===
Rank	Athlete	Nationality	Time	Notes
1st place, gold medalist(s)	Tegla Loroupe	Kenya	1:08:14	
2nd place, silver medalist(s)	Cristina Pomacu	Romania	1:08:43	
3rd place, bronze medalist(s)	Lidia Șimon	Romania	1:09:05	
4	Joyce Chepchumba	Kenya	1:09:07	
5	Nuta Olaru	Romania	1:09:52	
6	Katrin Heinig	Germany	1:09:56	
7	Lyudmila Petrova	Russia	1:10:02	
8	Rocío Ríos	Spain	1:10:06	
9	Mari Sotani	Japan	1:10:13	
10	Svetlana Zakharova	Russia	1:10:29	
11	Delilah Asiago	Kenya	1:10:36	
12	Noriko Geji	Japan	1:10:37	
13	Hiromi Katayama	Japan	1:10:48	
14	Aurica Buia	Romania	1:11:01	
15	Alina Tecuţă/Gherasim	Romania	1:11:02	
16	Petra Wassiluk	Germany	1:11:03	
17	Viktoria Nenasheva	Russia	1:11:14	
18	Iris Biba	Germany	1:11:17	
19	Lucia Subano	Kenya	1:11:39	
20	Hellen Kimaiyo	Kenya	1:11:42	
21	Christine Mallo	France	1:11:43	
22	Silvia Skvortsova	Russia	1:11:53	
23	Makiko Ito	Japan	1:12:08	
24	Lucilla Andreucci	Italy	1:12:21	
25	Sonja Deckers	Belgium	1:12:27	
26	Kore Alemu	Ethiopia	1:12:30	
27	Eyerusalem Kuma	Ethiopia	1:12:36	
28	Abebe Tola	Ethiopia	1:12:42	
29	Laura Fogli	Italy	1:12:43	
30	Mónica Pont	Spain	1:12:44	
31	Helena Javornik	Slovenia	1:12:51	
32	Nadir de Siqueira	Brazil	1:13:05	
33	Katrina Price	United States	1:13:07	
34	Ursula Jeitziner	Switzerland	1:13:10	
35	Lydia Mafula	South Africa	1:13:12	
36	Yelena Plastinina	Ukraine	1:13:20	
37	María Luisa Muñoz	Spain	1:13:33	
38	Lee-Ann McPhillips	New Zealand	1:13:42	
39	Yelena Makolova	Belarus	1:13:43	
40	Angela Joiner	Great Britain	1:13:44	
41	Kristijna Loonen	Netherlands	1:13:48	
42	Irina Šafářová	Russia	1:13:53	
43	Sally Goldsmith	Great Britain	1:14:08	
44	Leila Aman	Ethiopia	1:14:15	
45	Sonia Maccioni	Italy	1:14:18	
46	Line Kuster	France	1:14:20	
47	Simone Kuster	France	1:14:24	
48	Luciene de Deus	Brazil	1:14:25	
49	Galina Karnatsevich/Baruk	Belarus	1:14:42	
50	Tatyana Glazyr	Ukraine	1:14:44	
51	Ludmila Melicherová	Slovakia	1:14:45	
52	Susan Michelsson	Australia	1:14:51	
53	Jenny Crain	United States	1:15:05	
54	Maria Trujillo	United States	1:15:08	
55	Alta Lohann	South Africa	1:15:11	
56	Amanda Wright-Allen	Great Britain	1:15:21	
57	Angelines Rodríguez	Spain	1:15:23	
58	Natalya Galushko	Belarus	1:15:26	
59	Lorraine Masuoka/Hochella	United States	1:16:09	
60	Alla Zadorozhnaya	Belarus	1:16:11	
61	Lete Yesus	Ethiopia	1:16:34	
62	Ágnes Jakab	Hungary	1:16:38	
63	Vilija Birbalaitė	Lithuania	1:16:50	
64	Nina Korvryzkina	Ukraine	1:16:56	
65	Stephanie Manel	France	1:17:02	
66	Renee Kruse	United States	1:17:11	
67	Dana Janecková	Slovakia	1:17:45	
68	Monika Deverová	Czech Republic	1:17:50	
69	Muriel Linsolas	France	1:18:03	
70	Nili Avramski	Israel	1:18:15	
71	Tracey Swindell	Great Britain	1:19:40	
72	Alena Mocariová	Slovakia	1:20:02	
73	Alena Pochybová	Slovakia	1:21:22	
74	Anna Balosakova	Slovakia	1:22:10	
75	Adelaide Malepa	Lesotho	1:25:55	
76	Kristinka Marković	Croatia	1:28:36	
77	Ekateríni Fotopoúlou	Greece	1:33:29	
—	Yelena Mazovka	Belarus	DNF	
—	Christina Mai	Germany	DNF	
—	Jacky Newton	Great Britain	DNF	
—	Patrizia Ragno	Italy	DNF	
—	Elana Meyer	South Africa	DNF	
—	Tatyana Dzhabrayilova	Ukraine	DNF	
—	Agata Balsamo	Italy	DNS	

== Team Results ==
=== Men's ===
Rank	Country	Team	Time
1st place, gold medalist(s)	Kenya	Shem Kororia; Moses Tanui; Kenneth Cheruiyot	2:59:54
2nd place, silver medalist(s)	South Africa	Hendrick Ramaala; Gert Thys; Makhosonke Fika	3:03:34
3rd place, bronze medalist(s)	Ethiopia	Abraham Assefa; Lemma Alemayehu; Tesfaye Tola	3:03:46
4	Spain	Alejandro Gómez; Bartolomé Serrano; Antonio Peña	3:05:35
5	Italy	Stefano Baldini; Michele Gamba; Antonio Armuzzi	3:06:00
6	Japan	Osamu Nara; Noriaki Igarashi; Yoshifumi Miyamoto	3:06:37
7	Zimbabwe	Tendai Chimusasa; Abel Chimukoko; Fungai Kapanyota	3:07:01
8	Portugal	Luís Jesús; Alcidio Costa; Joaquim Pinheiro	3:07:22
9	Colombia	Herder Vázquez; Carlos Grisales; José Orlando Sánchez Guerrero	3:07:41
10	Hungary	Imre Berkovics; Tamás Kliszek; Zoltán Holba	3:08:55
11	Germany	Michael Fietz; Rainer Huth; Jens Karrass	3:09:31
12	France	Jean-Pierre Lautredoux; Hakim Bagy; Jean-Pierre Monciaux	3:09:33
13	Switzerland	Stéphane Schweickhardt; Viktor Röthlin; Hansjörg Brücker	3:09:54
14	Brazil	Eduardo do Nascimento; Elisvaldo de Carvalho; Daniel Ferreira	3:10:24
15	Belgium	Mohammed Mourhit; Ronny Ligneel; Jos Maes	3:11:12
16	Russia	Valeriy Kuzman; Pavel Kokin; Anton Nikolesko	3:12:19
17	Slovakia	Róbert Štefko; Petr Pipa; Miroslav Vanko	3:12:21
18	Great Britain	David Taylor; Alan Chilton; Glynn Tromans	3:12:23
19	Czech Republic	Jan Pešava; Vladimír Vašek; Jan Bláha	3:12:29
20	Tanzania	Wilbroad Axweso; Faustin Saktay; Neema Tuluway	3:13:10
21	Ukraine	Aleksandr Kuzin; Mykola Rudyk; Yuriy Gichun	3:16:12
22	Lesotho	Percy Sephoda; Khomojoo Kapane; Kopamo Pekile	3:16:37
23	Poland	Wiesław Figurski; Józef Kazanecki; Marek Sukiennik	3:16:52
24	United States	Todd Reeser; Darrell General; Eric Morrison	3:16:54
25	Belarus	Vladimir Tsyamchik; Vladimir Tonchinskiy; Boris Batuyev	3:17:32
26	Yugoslavia	Janko Benša; Ramiz Taipi; Vujadin Alempic	3:18:42
27	Israel	Dov Kremer; Amit Neʼeman; Adra Mocha	3:24:30
28	Croatia	Drago Paripović; Robert Prejnjak; Ivica Škopac	3:27:09
29	Lebanon	Ali Awad; Mehdi Chebli; Hussein Awada	3:29:44
30	Turkmenistan	Rustam Radjapov; Charygeldiy Allaberdiyev; Dovletmomed Nazarov	3:30:30
31	Kyrgyzstan	Vladimir Gusev; Leonid Pykhteyev; Aleksandr Levdanskiy	3:33:12
—	Bosnia and Herzegovina	Islam Dugum; Hidajet Bulic; Sead Kondo	DNF

=== Women's ===
Rank	Country	Team	Time
1st place, gold medalist(s)	Romania	Cristina Pomacu; Lidia Șimon; Nuta Olaru	3:27:40
2nd place, silver medalist(s)	Kenya	Tegla Loroupe; Joyce Chepchumba; Delilah Asiago	3:27:57
3rd place, bronze medalist(s)	Japan	Mari Sotani; Noriko Geji; Hiromi Katayama	3:31:38
4	Russia	Lyudmila Petrova; Svetlana Zakharova; Viktoria Nenasheva	3:31:45
5	Germany	Katrin Heinig; Petra Wassiluk; Iris Biba	3:32:16
6	Spain	Rocío Ríos; Mónica Pont; María Luisa Muñoz	3:36:23
7	Ethiopia	Kore Alemu; Eyerusalem Kuma; Abebe Tola	3:37:48
8	Italy	Lucilla Andreucci; Laura Fogli; Sonia Maccioni	3:39:22
9	France	Christine Mallo; Line Kuster; Simone Kuster	3:40:27
10	Great Britain	Angela Joiner; Sally Goldsmith; Amanda Wright-Allen	3:43:13
11	United States	Katrina Price; Jenny Crain; Maria Trujillo	3:43:20
12	Belarus	Yelena Makolova; Galina Karnatsevich/Baruk; Natalya Galushko	3:43:51
13	Ukraine	Yelena Plastinina; Tatyana Glazyr; Nina Korvryzkina	3:45:00
14	Slovakia	Ludmila Melicherová; Dana Janecková; Alena Mocariová	3:52:32
—	South Africa	Lydia Mafula; Alta Lohann; Elana Meyer	DNF

== Participation ==
The participation of 226 athletes (143 men/83 women) from 45 countries is reported.

- Armenia (1)
- Australia (3)
- Bahrain (2)
- Belarus (9)
- Belgium (4)
- Bosnia and Herzegovina (3)
- Brazil (7)
- Chinese Taipei (1)
- Colombia (3)
- Croatia (6)
- Czech Republic (5)
- Estonia (1)
- Ethiopia (10)
- France (10)
- Germany (7)
- Greece (1)
- Hungary (6)
- Israel (4)
- Italy (9)
- Japan (8)
- Kenya (10)
- Kyrgyzstan (3)
- Lebanon (4)
- Lesotho (6)
- Libya (1)
- Lithuania (2)
- Netherlands (2)
- New Zealand (2)
- Poland (3)
- Portugal (5)
- Romania (6)
- Russia (8)
- Slovakia (10)
- Slovenia (2)
- South Africa (7)
- Spain (9)
- Switzerland (5)
- Tanzania (3)
- Turkmenistan (3)
- Uganda (1)
- Ukraine (8)
- United Kingdom (10)
- United States (10)
- Yugoslavia (3)
- Zimbabwe (3)

== See also ==
- 1997 in athletics (track and field)
