= 1999 IAAF World Half Marathon Championships =

- Organisers: IAAF
- Edition: 8th
- Date: October 3
- Host city: Palermo, Sicily, Italy
- Events: 2
- Participation: 192 athletes from 48 nations

The 8th IAAF World Half Marathon Championships was held on October 3, 1999, in the city of Palermo, Italy. A total of 192 athletes, 119 men and 73 women, from 48 countries, took part. The course was traced through the historical centre of the town with the start/finish line on the "Foro Italico." A detailed report on the event and an appraisal of the results were given.

Complete results were published.

== Medallists ==
Event	Gold		Silver		Bronze	
Individual
Men	Paul Tergat (KEN)	1:01:50	Hendrick Ramaala (RSA)	1:01:50	Tesfaye Jifar (ETH)	1:01:51
Women	Tegla Loroupe (KEN)	1:08:48	Mizuki Noguchi (JPN)	1:09:12	Catherine Ndereba (KEN)	1:09:23
Team
Team Men	South Africa	3:06:01	Ethiopia	3:06:03	Kenya	3:06:03
Team Women	Kenya	3:27:40	Japan	3:30:06	Russia	3:31:49

== Race results ==
=== Men's ===
Rank	Athlete	Nationality	Time	Notes
1st place, gold medalist(s)	Paul Tergat	Kenya	1:01:50	
2nd place, silver medalist(s)	Hendrick Ramaala	South Africa	1:01:50	
3rd place, bronze medalist(s)	Tesfaye Jifar	Ethiopia	1:01:51	
4	Abdellah Béhar	France	1:01:53	
5	Eduardo Henriques	Portugal	1:01:53	
6	Abner Chipu	South Africa	1:01:54	
7	Laban Chege	Kenya	1:01:54	
8	Tesfaye Tola	Ethiopia	1:01:56	
9	Fekadu Degefu	Ethiopia	1:02:16	
10	Mluleki Nobanda	South Africa	1:02:17	
11	Sammy Korir	Kenya	1:02:19	
12	Gert Thys	South Africa	1:02:24	
13	Kamiel Maase	Netherlands	1:02:33	
14	Toshiyuki Hayata	Japan	1:02:35	
15	Faustin Baha	Tanzania	1:02:41	
16	Gebremariam Gebremedhin	Ethiopia	1:02:46	
17	Philip Rugut	Kenya	1:02:59	
18	Rachid Berradi	Italy	1:03:03	
19	Larbi Zéroual	France	1:03:05	
20	Alberto Chaíça	Portugal	1:03:08	
21	Toshiaki Tezuka	Japan	1:03:20	
22	Araya Berhane	Ethiopia	1:03:24	
23	Shigeru Aburaya	Japan	1:03:26	
24	Rachid Ziar	Algeria	1:03:32	
25	Teodoro Cuñado	Spain	1:03:33	
26	Javier Caballero	Spain	1:03:39	
27	Mohamed Serbouti	France	1:03:41	
28	Jafred Lorone	Uganda	1:03:44	
29	José Ramos	Portugal	1:03:49	
30	Tsuyoshi Ogata	Japan	1:03:50	
31	Antonio Martins	France	1:03:55	
32	Jumanne Tuluway	Tanzania	1:03:57	
33	Antonio Serrano	Spain	1:03:58	
34	Hakim Bagy	France	1:03:58	
35	Koen Allaert	Belgium	1:04:00	
36	Giacomo Leone	Italy	1:04:00	
37	Roberto Barbi	Italy	1:04:02	
38	Aiduna Aitnafa	Netherlands	1:04:02	
39	Said Boumhandi	Morocco	1:04:10	
40	Mark Steinle	Great Britain	1:04:11	
41	Scott Larson	United States	1:04:14	
42	Alejandro Cuahtepizi	Mexico	1:04:32	
43	José Dias	Portugal	1:04:32	
44	Christian Nemeth	Belgium	1:04:42	
45	Vladimir Tsyamchik	Belarus	1:04:44	
46	John Sence	United States	1:04:55	
47	Kim Gillard	Australia	1:05:04	
48	Marco Gielen	Netherlands	1:05:08	
49	António Resende	Portugal	1:05:11	
50	Kevin Odiorne	United States	1:05:19	
51	Amar Dahbi	Algeria	1:05:19	
51	Kamal Kohil	Algeria	1:05:19	
52	Sebastiano Mazzara	Italy	1:05:20	
53	Sebastian Bürklein	Germany	1:05:21	
54	Ahmed Abd El-Mangoud	Egypt	1:05:34	
55	Pavel Loskutov	Estonia	1:05:45	
56	Rachid Boulenouar	Algeria	1:05:47	
57	Miguel Bravo	Mexico	1:05:47	
58	Nick Jones	Great Britain	1:05:57	
59	Drago Paripović	Croatia	1:05:58	
60	Stéphane Rousseau	Belgium	1:06:10	
61	Delmir dos Santos	Brazil	1:06:13	
62	David Taylor	Great Britain	1:06:13	
63	Alphonse Munyeshyaka	Rwanda	1:06:21	
64	Masayuki Kobayashi	Japan	1:06:26	
65	Borislav Dević	Yugoslavia	1:06:32	
66	Francis Yiga	Uganda	1:06:47	
67	Oscar Fernández	Spain	1:06:50	
68	Fouly Salem	Egypt	1:06:50	
69	Zarislav Gapeyenko	Belarus	1:06:52	
70	Christian Fischer	Germany	1:06:54	
71	Sipho Dlamini	Swaziland	1:06:59	
72	Jan Křižák	Slovakia	1:07:00	
73	Toomas Tarm	Estonia	1:07:08	
74	Ali Awad	Lebanon	1:07:10	
75	Ahmed Abdel Rasool Badry	Egypt	1:07:17	
76	Leszek Lewandowski	Poland	1:07:25	
77	Margus Pirksaar	Estonia	1:07:32	
78	Pavel Faschingbauer	Czech Republic	1:07:39	
79	Isaiah Dlamini	Swaziland	1:07:42	
80	Oliver Mintzlaff	Germany	1:07:42	
81	Lucky Bhembe	Swaziland	1:07:44	
82	Vasilios Zabélis	Greece	1:07:47	
83	Glynn Tromans	Great Britain	1:07:49	
84	Jeff Campbell	United States	1:07:50	
85	Job Sikoria	Uganda	1:08:30	
86	Michael Fietz	Germany	1:08:33	
87	Francisco Bautista	Mexico	1:08:38	
88	Sokhibdjan Sharipov	Tajikistan	1:08:50	
89	Gabriel Mazimpaka	Rwanda	1:08:51	
90	Nedeljko Ravić	Croatia	1:08:55	
91	António Zeferino	Cape Verde	1:09:05	
92	Seif Eldin El-Nur	Sudan	1:09:10	
93	Joseph Sterlino	Sudan	1:09:27	
94	Shadrack Hoff	South Africa	1:09:44	
95	Cordero Roy Vargas	Costa Rica	1:10:02	
96	Ahmed Boulahia	Algeria	1:10:07	
97	Ramiz Taipi	Yugoslavia	1:10:11	
98	Mohamed Al-Khawlani	Yemen	1:10:11	
99	Vladimir Tonchinskiy	Belarus	1:10:12	
100	Ivica Škopac	Croatia	1:10:13	
101	Miguel Romero	Ecuador	1:13:19	
102	Hussein Awada	Lebanon	1:13:35	
103	Ihab Salama	Palestine	1:13:41	
104	Omar Abdel Latif	Lebanon	1:14:05	
105	Weldon Johnson	United States	1:14:58	
106	Frederick Baldacchino	Malta	1:14:58	
107	Khalid Al-Estashi	Yemen	1:15:40	
108	Vasiliy Andreyev	Uzbekistan	1:16:35	
109	Abdel Salam Al-Dabaji	Palestine	1:18:48	
—	Daniel Ferreira	Brazil	DNF	
—	Geraldo Francisco de Assis	Brazil	DNF	
—	Luíz Antônio dos Santos	Brazil	DNF	
—	Michele Gamba	Italy	DNF	
—	Shem Kororia	Kenya	DNF	
—	Ali Mohamad	Sudan	DNF	
—	John Nada Saya	Tanzania	DNF	
—	Yevgeniy Nujdin	Uzbekistan	DNF	
—	Esmail Al-Dawla	Yemen	DNF	
—	Silvio Guerra	Ecuador	DNS	
—	Nestor Jarni	Ecuador	DNS	
—	Ahmed Aly Aly	Egypt	DNS	
—	Wael Anwar Adan	Egypt	DNS	
—	José Luis Ebatela Nvó	Equatorial Guinea	DNS	
—	Diosdado Edjang Ndemesogo	Equatorial Guinea	DNS	
—	Sergey Zabavski	Tajikistan	DNS	
—	Joseph Nsubuga	Uganda	DNS	
—	Santino Diang	Sudan	DNS	
—	Gabriel Ndour	Senegal	DNS	
—	Malick Seck	Senegal	DNS	
—	Medson Chibwe	Zambia	DNS	
—	Vincent Hatuleke	Zambia	DNS	
—	Sam Mfula Mwape	Zambia	DNS	
—	Mohammed S.A. Salama	Palestine	DNS	

=== Women's ===
Rank	Athlete	Nationality	Time	Notes
1st place, gold medalist(s)	Tegla Loroupe	Kenya	1:08:48	
2nd place, silver medalist(s)	Mizuki Noguchi	Japan	1:09:12	
3rd place, bronze medalist(s)	Catherine Ndereba	Kenya	1:09:23	
4	Joyce Chepchumba	Kenya	1:09:29	
5	Reiko Tosa	Japan	1:09:36	
6	Valentina Yegorova	Russia	1:09:59	
7	Elana Meyer	South Africa	1:10:20	
8	Luminița Talpoș	Romania	1:10:33	
9	Lyudmila Biktasheva	Russia	1:10:35	
10	Alina Ivanova	Russia	1:11:15	
11	Hiromi Katayama	Japan	1:11:18	
12	Constantina Diţă	Romania	1:11:22	
13	Margaret Okayo	Kenya	1:11:29	
14	Derartu Tulu	Ethiopia	1:11:33	
15	Ana Isabel Alonso	Spain	1:11:38	
16	Cristina Pomacu	Romania	1:11:45	
17	Satomi Matsuo	Japan	1:11:48	
18	Lyudmila Petrova	Russia	1:11:53	
19	Agata Balsamo	Italy	1:11:58	
20	Jane Omoro	Kenya	1:12:10	
21	Olivera Jevtić	Yugoslavia	1:12:32	
22	Marian Sutton	Great Britain	1:12:36	
23	Rosaria Console	Italy	1:12:46	
24	María Abel	Spain	1:13:08	
25	Lyubov Morgunova	Russia	1:13:25	
26	Ritsuko Sasaki	Japan	1:13:26	
27	Florinda Andreucci	Italy	1:13:33	
28	Tereza Yohanes	Ethiopia	1:13:38	
29	Birhan Dagne	Great Britain	1:13:41	
30	Fatima Hajjami	France	1:13:55	
31	Gabrielle OʼRourke	New Zealand	1:14:12	
32	Gitte Karlshøj	Denmark	1:14:15	
33	Lucilla Andreucci	Italy	1:15:05	
34	Susan Michelsson	Australia	1:15:07	
35	Mónica Pont	Spain	1:15:12	
36	Alemitu Bekele	Ethiopia	1:15:27	
37	Marlene Fortunato	Brazil	1:15:29	
38	Teyba Erkesso	Ethiopia	1:15:48	
39	Michelle Byrne	United States	1:15:55	
40	Lynn Fitzsimmons	United States	1:16:14	
41	Christine McNamara	United States	1:16:18	
42	Marie Boyd	United States	1:16:37	
43	Annemette Jensen	Denmark	1:16:47	
44	Asegedech Gizaw	Ethiopia	1:16:53	
45	Silvana Trampuz	Australia	1:17:12	
46	Stefanija Statkuvienė	Belgium	1:17:30	
47	Theresa du Toit	South Africa	1:17:33	
48	Jo Lodge	Great Britain	1:17:36	
49	Krystyna Pieczulis	Poland	1:18:02	
50	Azwindini Lukhwareni	South Africa	1:18:28	
51	Carlien Cornelissen	South Africa	1:18:37	
52	Shireen Crumpton	New Zealand	1:19:21	
53	Kelly Liljeblad	United States	1:19:23	
54	Nili Avramski	Israel	1:20:20	
55	Yeoryía Abatzídou	Greece	1:20:45	
56	Dana Janecková	Slovakia	1:21:28	
57	Vesna Stevanović	Yugoslavia	1:21:34	
58	Sarah Mahlangu	South Africa	1:22:01	
59	Margarita Cabello	Mexico	1:22:28	
60	Tijana Pavičić	Croatia	1:25:58	
61	Slavica Brčić	Croatia	1:25:59	
62	Irina Matrosova	Uzbekistan	1:28:25	
63	Kristinka Marković	Croatia	1:30:24	
64	Gina Coello	Honduras	1:30:27	
65	Yuliya Arfipova	Uzbekistan	1:35:45	
66	Aleksandra Rodigina	Uzbekistan	1:35:45	
—	Carolyn Schuwalov	Australia	DNF	
—	Sonja Deckers	Belgium	DNF	
—	Milka Mihailova	Bulgaria	DNF	
—	Annick Clouvel	France	DNF	
—	Sonia Maccioni	Italy	DNF	
—	Iulia Olteanu	Romania	DNF	
—	Valentina Enaki	Moldova	DNS	
—	Mable Chiwama	Zambia	DNS	
—	Florina Pana	Romania	DQ^{†}	

^{†}: Florina Pana from Romania was initially 4th (1:09:26), but tested positive for nandrolone and disqualified.

== Team results ==
=== Men's ===
Rank	Country	Team	Time
1st place, gold medalist(s)	South Africa	Hendrick Ramaala; Abner Chipu; Mluleki Nobanda	3:06:01
2nd place, silver medalist(s)	Ethiopia	Tesfaye Jifar; Tesfaye Tola; Fekadu Degefu	3:06:03
3rd place, bronze medalist(s)	Kenya	Paul Tergat; Laban Chege; Sammy Korir	3:06:03
4	France	Abdellah Béhar; Larbi Zéroual; Mohamed Serbouti	3:08:39
5	Portugal	Eduardo Henriques; Alberto Chaíça; José Ramos	3:08:50
6	Japan	Toshiyuki Hayata; Toshiaki Tezuka; Shigeru Aburaya	3:09:21
7	Italy	Rachid Berradi; Giacomo Leone; Roberto Barbi	3:11:05
8	Spain	Teodoro Cuñado; Javier Caballero; Antonio Serrano	3:11:10
9	Netherlands	Kamiel Maase; Aiduna Aitnafa; Marco Gielen	3:11:43
10	United States	Scott Larson; John Sence; Kevin Odiorne	3:14:28
11	Algeria	Rachid Ziar; Amar Dahbi; Kamal Kohil	3:14:10
12	Belgium	Koen Allaert; Christian Nemeth; Stéphane Rousseau	3:14:52
13	Great Britain	Mark Steinle; Nick Jones; David Taylor	3:16:21
14	Mexico	Alejandro Cuahtepizi; Miguel Bravo; Francisco Bautista	3:18:57
15	Uganda	Jafred Lorone; Francis Yiga; Job Sikoria	3:19:01
16	Egypt	Ahmed Abd El-Mangoud; Fouly Salem; Ahmed Abdel Rasool Badry	3:19:41
17	Germany	Sebastian Bürklein; Christian Fischer; Oliver Mintzlaff	3:19:57
18	Estonia	Pavel Loskutov; Toomas Tarm; Margus Pirksaar	3:20:25
19	Belarus	Vladimir Tsyamchik; Zarislav Gapeyenko; Vladimir Tonchinskiy	3:21:48
20	Swaziland	Sipho Dlamini; Isaiah Dlamini; Lucky Bhembe	3:22:25
21	Croatia	Drago Paripović; Nedeljko Ravić; Ivica Škopac	3:25:06
22	Lebanon	Ali Awad; Hussein Awada; Omar Abdel Latif	3:34:50
—	Brazil	Delmir dos Santos; Daniel Ferreira; Geraldo Francisco de Assis	DNF
—	Sudan	Seif Eldin El-Nur; Joseph Sterlino; Ali Mohamad	DNF
—	Tanzania	Faustin Baha; Jumanne Tuluway; John Nada Saya	DNF
—	Yemen	Mohamed Al-Khawlani; Khalid Al-Estashi; Esmail Al-Dawla	DNF

=== Women's ===
Rank	Country	Team	Time
1st place, gold medalist(s)	Kenya	Tegla Loroupe; Catherine Ndereba; Joyce Chepchumba	3:27:40
2nd place, silver medalist(s)	Japan	Mizuki Noguchi; Reiko Tosa; Hiromi Katayama	3:30:06
3rd place, bronze medalist(s)	Russia	Valentina Yegorova; Lyudmila Biktasheva; Alina Ivanova	3:31:49
4	Romania	Luminița Talpoș; Constantina Diţă; Cristina Pomacu	3:33:40
5	Italy	Agata Balsamo; Rosaria Console; Florinda Andreucci	3:38:17
6	Spain	Ana Isabel Alonso; María Abel; Mónica Pont	3:39:58
7	Ethiopia	Derartu Tulu; Tereza Yohanes; Alemitu Bekele Aga	3:40:38
8	Great Britain	Marian Sutton; Birhan Dagne; Jo Lodge	3:43:53
9	South Africa	Elana Meyer; Theresa du Toit; Azwindini Lukhwareni	3:46:21
10	United States	Michelle Byrne; Lynn Fitzsimmons; Christine McNamara	3:48:27
11	Croatia	Tijana Pavičić; Slavica Brčić; Kristinka Marković	4:22:21
12	Uzbekistan	Irina Matrosova; Yuliya Arfipova; Aleksandra Rodigina	4:39:55
—	Australia	Susan Michelsson; Silvana Trampuz; Carolyn Schuwalov	DNF

== Participation ==
The participation of 192 athletes (119 men/73 women) from 48 countries is reported. Although announced, athletes from Equatorial Guinea, Moldova, Senegal, and Zambia did not show.

- Algeria (5)
- Australia (4)
- Belarus (3)
- Belgium (5)
- Brazil (4)
- Bulgaria (1)
- Cape Verde (1)
- Costa Rica (1)
- Croatia (6)
- Czech Republic (1)
- Denmark (2)
- Ecuador (1)
- Egypt (3)
- Estonia (3)
- Ethiopia (10)
- France (7)
- Germany (4)
- Greece (2)
- Honduras (1)
- Israel (1)
- Italy (10)
- Japan (10)
- Kenya (10)
- Lebanon (3)
- Malta (1)
- Morocco (1)
- Mexico (4)
- Netherlands (3)
- New Zealand (2)
- Palestine (2)
- Poland (2)
- Portugal (5)
- Romania (5)
- Russia (5)
- Rwanda (2)
- Slovakia (2)
- South Africa (10)
- Spain (7)
- Sudan (3)
- Swaziland (3)
- Tajikistan (1)
- Tanzania (3)
- Uganda (3)
- United Kingdom (7)
- United States (10)
- Uzbekistan (5)
- Yemen (3)
- Yugoslavia (4)

== See also ==
- 1999 in athletics (track and field)
