= 1998 IAAF World Half Marathon Championships =

- Organisers: IAAF
- Edition: 7th
- Date: September 27
- Host city: Uster, Zürich, Switzerland
- Events: 2
- Participation: 236 athletes from 54 nations

The 7th IAAF World Half Marathon Championships was held on September 27, 1998, in the city of Uster, Switzerland. A total of 236 athletes, 139 men and 97 women, from 54 countries took part.

Detailed reports on the event and an appraisal of the results was given.

Complete results were published.

== Medallists ==
Event	Gold		Silver		Bronze	
Individual
Men	Paul Koech (KEN)	1:00:01	Hendrick Ramaala (RSA)	1:00:24	Khalid Skah (MAR)	1:00:24
Women	Tegla Loroupe (KEN)	1:08:29	Elana Meyer (RSA)	1:08:32	Lidia Șimon (ROU)	1:08:58
Team
Team Men	South Africa	3:02:21	Kenya	3:03:07	Ethiopia	3:05:18
Team Women	Kenya	3:29:43	Romania	3:32:19	Spain	3:34:18

== Race results ==
=== Men's ===
Rank	Athlete	Nationality	Time	Notes
1st place, gold medalist(s)	Paul Koech	Kenya	1:00:01	PB
2nd place, silver medalist(s)	Hendrick Ramaala	South Africa	1:00:24	
3rd place, bronze medalist(s)	Khalid Skah	Morocco	1:00:24	PB
4	Ibrahim Seid	Ethiopia	1:00:31	PB
5	Gert Thys	South Africa	1:00:37	
6	Antonio Silio	Argentina	1:00:45	NR
7	Luís Jesús	Portugal	1:01:10	
8	Tendai Chimusasa	Zimbabwe	1:01:14	
9	Abner Chipu	South Africa	1:01:20	
10	Shem Kororia	Kenya	1:01:30	
11	John Gwako	Kenya	1:01:36	
12	Ronaldo da Costa	Brazil	1:01:40	
13	Joseph Kibor	Kenya	1:01:42	
14	Bartolomé Serrano	Spain	1:01:43	PB
15	Martín Fiz	Spain	1:01:47	
16	Luís Novo	Portugal	1:01:50	PB
17	Carsten Jørgensen	Denmark	1:01:55	PB
18	Javier Cortés	Spain	1:02:02	PB
19	Alemayehu Girma	Ethiopia	1:02:07	PB
20	Janko Benša	Yugoslavia	1:02:11	PB
21	Joseph Kimani	Kenya	1:02:15	
22	Maxwell Zungu	South Africa	1:02:16	PB
23	Osamu Nara	Japan	1:02:21	
24	Carlos Patrício	Portugal	1:02:22	
25	Danilo Goffi	Italy	1:02:24	
26	Mohamed Ouaadi	France	1:02:29	PB
27	Daniele Caimmi	Italy	1:02:33	PB
28	Ali Mabrouk El-Zaidi	Libya	1:02:39	PB
29	Addis Abebe	Ethiopia	1:02:40	
30	Atsushi Fujita	Japan	1:02:45	
31	Stéphane Schweickhardt	Switzerland	1:02:48	
32	Giacomo Leone	Italy	1:02:49	
33	Alene Emere	Ethiopia	1:02:50	
34	Kebede Tekeste	Ethiopia	1:02:51	PB
35	Wilbroad Axweso	Tanzania	1:02:52	
36	Javier Caballero	Spain	1:02:54	PB
37	João N'Tyamba	Angola	1:02:54	PB
38	Marco Gielen	Netherlands	1:02:57	
39	Alberto Chaíça	Portugal	1:03:03	
40	Mohamed Serbouti	France	1:03:07	PB
41	José Orlando Sánchez Guerrero	Colombia	1:03:08	
42	Alfred Shemweta	Sweden	1:03:20	
43	Francesco Ingargiola	Italy	1:03:30	
44	Valdenor dos Santos	Brazil	1:03:32	
45	Juan Carlos Gutiérrez	Colombia	1:03:42	
46	Delfim Conceição	Portugal	1:03:44	
47	Carlos Grisales	Colombia	1:03:47	
48	Pedro Rojas	Colombia	1:03:59	PB
49	Antonio Pérez	Spain	1:04:06	
50	Krzysztof Przybyła	Poland	1:04:07	PB
51	Ezael Thlobo	South Africa	1:04:08	
52	Benedict Ako	Tanzania	1:04:14	
53	Richard Potts	New Zealand	1:04:16	PB
54	André Ramos	Brazil	1:04:17	PB
55	Eryk Szostak	Poland	1:04:20	
56	Jonathan Wyatt	New Zealand	1:04:23	PB
57	Stephen Bwalya	Zambia	1:04:26	
58	Viktor Röthlin	Switzerland	1:04:30	
59	Alex Malinga	Uganda	1:04:33	PB
60	Joseph Nsengiyumya	Rwanda	1:04:40	PB
61	Vladimir Tsyamchik	Belarus	1:04:43	
62	Sam Mwape	Zambia	1:04:44	
63	Bigboy Goromonzi	Zimbabwe	1:04:46	
64	Katsuhiko Hanada	Japan	1:04:53	
65	Jean-Pierre Lautredoux	France	1:04:59	
66	Pavel Loskutov	Estonia	1:05:00	PB
67	Elijah Mutandiro	Zimbabwe	1:05:03	
68	Koji Kimura	Japan	1:05:06	
69	Craig Kirkwood	New Zealand	1:05:08	
70	Oliver Mintzlaff	Germany	1:05:09	PB
71	Borislav Dević	Yugoslavia	1:05:14	
72	Michael Fietz	Germany	1:05:15	
73	Todd Reeser	United States	1:05:18	
74	Tekeye Gebrselassie	Netherlands	1:05:18	
75	Hansjörg Brücker	Switzerland	1:05:19	
76	Toomas Tarm	Estonia	1:05:21	PB
77	Eduardo do Nascimento	Brazil	1:05:27	
78	Safari Ingi	Tanzania	1:05:34	
79	Gabriel Mazimpaka	Rwanda	1:05:35	
80	Gavin Gaynor	United States	1:05:36	PB
81	Peter van der Velden	Netherlands	1:05:47	
82	Eric Morrison	United States	1:05:50	
83	Markus Gerber	Switzerland	1:05:51	
84	Jan Křižák	Slovakia	1:05:56	PB
85	Patrick Phillips	United States	1:05:58	PB
86	Ceslovas Kundrotas	Lithuania	1:05:59	
87	Pavelas Fedorenko	Lithuania	1:05:59	
88	Felix Mbuye	Zambia	1:06:00	
89	Peter Visser	Netherlands	1:06:00	
90	Steffen Benecke	Germany	1:06:04	
91	Miroslav Sajler	Czech Republic	1:06:06	
92	Joseph Nsubuga	Uganda	1:06:09	PB
93	Daniel Ferreira	Brazil	1:06:14	
94	Ben Chesang	Uganda	1:06:29	PB
95	Margus Pirksaar	Estonia	1:06:31	PB
96	Philip Rist	Switzerland	1:06:32	
97	Pavel Dudr	Czech Republic	1:06:34	
98	Sipho Dlamini	Swaziland	1:06:45	PB
99	Ali Awad	Lebanon	1:06:50	
100	Andrew Peskett	New Zealand	1:06:51	PB
101	Vladimir Gusev	Kyrgyzstan	1:06:55	
102	Pavel Faschingbauer	Czech Republic	1:06:56	
103	Menon Ramsamy	Mauritius	1:07:05	
104	Jean-François Bertron	France	1:07:06	
105	Pascal Fetizon	France	1:07:07	
106	Jiří Hajzler	Czech Republic	1:07:15	
107	Michael Wolf	Germany	1:07:24	
108	Patrick Ishyaka	Rwanda	1:07:42	
109	Darrell General	United States	1:07:48	
110	Christian Fischer	Germany	1:07:56	
111	Ramiz Taipi	Yugoslavia	1:08:18	
112	Arunas Balciunas	Lithuania	1:08:28	
113	Wiesław Figurski	Poland	1:08:31	
114	Samuli Vasala	Finland	1:08:43	
115	Hidajet Bulic	Bosnia and Herzegovina	1:09:10	PB
116	Mehdi Chebli	Lebanon	1:09:53	
117	António Zeferino	Cape Verde	1:10:19	
118	Omar Abdel Latif	Lebanon	1:10:37	
119	Kaare Sørensen	Denmark	1:10:39	
120	Room Singh	India	1:10:40	PB
121	Charygeldiy Allaberdiyev	Turkmenistan	1:10:49	
122	Roland Wille	Liechtenstein	1:10:56	
123	Hari Singh	India	1:10:58	PB
124	Raj Pal	India	1:11:05	PB
125	Clement Omagoro	Uganda	1:11:15	PB
126	Josip Lacković	Croatia	1:11:48	
127	Drago Paripović	Croatia	1:12:18	
128	Robert Prejnjak	Croatia	1:12:28	
129	José Luis Ebatela	Equatorial Guinea	1:13:01	PB
130	Eric Vamben	Mauritius	1:13:38	
131	Liam Byrne	Gibraltar	1:14:11	
132	Judex Durhone	Mauritius	1:15:14	
133	Dovletmomed Nazarov	Turkmenistan	1:16:01	
134	Louis Chichon	Gibraltar	1:16:18	
135	Aleksandr Levdanskiy	Kyrgyzstan	1:19:25	
—	Diego Colorado	Colombia	DNF	
—	Saša Ljubojević	Croatia	DNF	
—	Michele Gamba	Italy	DNF	
—	Parakhat Kurtgeldiyev	Turkmenistan	DNF	

=== Women's ===
Rank	Athlete	Nationality	Time	Notes
1st place, gold medalist(s)	Tegla Loroupe	Kenya	1:08:29	
2nd place, silver medalist(s)	Elana Meyer	South Africa	1:08:32	
3rd place, bronze medalist(s)	Lidia Șimon	Romania	1:08:58	PB
4	Olivera Jevtić	Yugoslavia	1:10:02	
5	Annemari Sandell	Finland	1:10:04	
6	Joyce Chepchumba	Kenya	1:10:10	
7	Julia Vaquero	Spain	1:10:33	
8	Cristina Pomacu	Romania	1:10:39	
9	Yukiko Okamoto	Japan	1:10:50	
10	Leah Malot	Kenya	1:11:04	
11	Albertina Dias	Portugal	1:11:08	
12	Alina Ivanova	Russia	1:11:18	
13	Svetlana Zakharova	Russia	1:11:26	
14	María Luisa Lárraga	Spain	1:11:30	PB
15	Maria Guida	Italy	1:11:31	
16	Irma Heeren	Netherlands	1:11:35	
17	Rakiya Maraoui	France	1:11:44	
18	Franziska Rochat	Switzerland	1:11:47	
19	Asha Gigi	Ethiopia	1:11:49	PB
20	Firiya Sultanova-Zhdanova	Russia	1:11:53	
21	Lornah Kiplagat	Kenya	1:12:09	
22	Kazumi Matsuo	Japan	1:12:12	
23	Rocío Ríos	Spain	1:12:15	
24	Daria Nauer	Switzerland	1:12:25	
25	Zahia Dahmani	France	1:12:27	
26	Lucilla Andreucci	Italy	1:12:34	
27	Franca Fiacconi	Italy	1:12:37	
28	Jody Hawkins	United States	1:12:38	
29	Constantina Diţă-Tomescu	Romania	1:12:42	
30	Sylvia Renz	Germany	1:12:44	
31	Nicole Whiteford	South Africa	1:12:49	
32	Maren Östringer	Germany	1:12:49	
33	Melissa Moon	New Zealand	1:13:06	
34	Mayumi Ichikawa	Japan	1:13:16	
35	Aurica Buia	Romania	1:13:44	
36	Annemette Jensen	Denmark	1:13:47	
37	Galina Karnatsevich/Baruk	Belarus	1:13:47	
38	Rosa Oliveira	Portugal	1:13:52	
39	Alena Peterková	Czech Republic	1:13:58	
40	Annick Clouvel	France	1:14:02	
41	Jackline Torori	Kenya	1:14:03	
42	Shelly Steely	United States	1:14:06	
43	Yelena Mazovka	Belarus	1:14:16	
44	Irina Šafářová	Russia	1:14:28	
45	Takako Kotorida	Japan	1:14:32	
46	Leila Aman	Ethiopia	1:14:36	
47	Elsabet Truneh	Ethiopia	1:14:37	PB
48	Birgit Jerschabek	Germany	1:14:45	
49	Satoko Karita	Japan	1:14:48	
51	Christine McNamara	United States	1:15:01	
52	Liz Yelling/Talbot	Great Britain	1:15:06	PB
53	Dorota Gruca-Giezek	Poland	1:15:12	
54	Florinda Andreucci	Italy	1:15:14	
55	Clarisse Rasoarizay	Madagascar	1:15:43	
56	Helána Barócsi	Hungary	1:15:48	
56	Martha Ernstdóttir	Iceland	1:15:48	
57	Pan Jinhong	China	1:15:56	
58	Wang Yanfang	China	1:15:56	
59	Marietjie McDermott	South Africa	1:15:56	
60	Fátima Cabral	Portugal	1:16:05	
61	Trina Painter	United States	1:16:10	
62	Kim Pawelek	United States	1:16:22	
63	Inga Juodeškienė	Lithuania	1:16:23	
64	Debbie Percival	Great Britain	1:16:25	
65	Yelena Makolova	Belarus	1:16:31	
66	Ursula Jeitziner	Switzerland	1:16:40	
67	Alison Wyeth	Great Britain	1:16:44	
68	Elisabeth Krieg-Ruprecht	Switzerland	1:16:50	
69	Dita Hebelková	Czech Republic	1:17:20	PB
70	Anna-Ursula Olbrecht	Switzerland	1:17:20	
71	Maria Bradley	Great Britain	1:17:25	
72	Yigezu Tsehay	Ethiopia	1:17:30	PB
73	Maree Bunce	New Zealand	1:17:51	
74	Eti Einer	Israel	1:18:01	PB
75	Asegedech Gizaw	Ethiopia	1:18:13	
76	Lydia Mafula	South Africa	1:18:14	
77	Mirjana Glisovic	Yugoslavia	1:18:52	
78	Vilija Birbalaitė	Lithuania	1:19:21	
79	Sue Reinsford	Great Britain	1:19:30	
80	Mable Chiwama	Zambia	1:19:34	
81	Dana Janecková	Slovakia	1:19:50	
82	Suzana Čirić	Yugoslavia	1:20:10	
83	Luz Fabiola Rueda	Colombia	1:20:24	
84	Chanda Mwansa	Zambia	1:20:47	
85	Jean Mpundu	Zambia	1:21:22	
86	Annie Coathalem	France	1:21:39	
87	Irena Šádková	Czech Republic	1:21:40	
88	Ines Cronjäger	Germany	1:21:52	
89	Anna Markelova	Turkmenistan	1:22:13	PB
90	Rigzen Angmo	India	1:31:36	
91	Esperanza Obono	Equatorial Guinea	1:33:59	
92	Kristinka Marković	Croatia	1:34:04	
93	Sarbjett Kaur	India	1:34:06	
—	Natalia Bendzik	Belarus	DNF	
—	Chantal Dällenbach	France	DNF	
—	Sonia Maccioni	Italy	DNF	
—	Nuta Olaru	Romania	DNF	

== Team Results ==
=== Men's ===
Rank	Country	Team	Time
1st place, gold medalist(s)	South Africa	Hendrick Ramaala; Gert Thys; Abner Chipu	3:02:21
2nd place, silver medalist(s)	Kenya	Paul Koech; Shem Kororia; John Gwako	3:03:07
3rd place, bronze medalist(s)	Ethiopia	Ibrahim Seid; Alemayehu Girma; Addis Abebe	3:05:18
4	Portugal	Luís Jesús; Luís Novo; Carlos Patrício	3:05:22
5	Spain	Bartolomé Serrano; Martín Fiz; Javier Cortés	3:05:32
6	Italy	Danilo Goffi; Daniele Caimmi; Giacomo Leone	3:07:46
7	Brazil	Ronaldo da Costa; Valdenor dos Santos; André Ramos	3:09:29
8	Japan	Osamu Nara; Atsushi Fujita; Katsuhiko Hanada	3:09:59
9	France	Mohamed Ouaadi; Mohamed Serbouti; Jean-Pierre Lautredoux	3:10:35
10	Colombia	José Orlando Sánchez Guerrero; Juan Carlos Gutiérrez; Carlos Grisales	3:10:37
11	Zimbabwe	Tendai Chimusasa; Bigboy Goromonzi; Elijah Mutandiro	3:11:03
12	Switzerland	Stéphane Schweickhardt; Viktor Röthlin; Hansjörg Brücker	3:12:37
13	Tanzania	Wilbroad Axweso; Benedict Ako; Safari Ingi	3:12:40
14	New Zealand	Richard Potts; Jonathan Wyatt; Craig Kirkwood	3:13:47
15	Netherlands	Marco Gielen; Tekeye Gebrselassie; Peter van der Velden	3:14:02
16	Zambia	Stephen Bwalya; Sam Mwape; Felix Mbuye	3:15:10
17	Yugoslavia	Janko Benša; Borislav Dević; Ramiz Taipi	3:15:43
18	Germany	Oliver Mintzlaff; Michael Fietz; Steffen Benecke	3:16:28
19	United States	Todd Reeser; Gavin Gaynor; Eric Morrison	3:16:44
20	Estonia	Pavel Loskutov; Toomas Tarm; Margus Pirksaar	3:16:52
21	Poland	Krzysztof Przybyła; Eryk Szostak; Wiesław Figurski	3:16:58
22	Uganda	Alex Malinga; Joseph Nsubuga; Ben Chesang	3:17:11
23	Rwanda	Joseph Nsengiyumya; Gabriel Mazimpaka; Patrick Ishyaka	3:17:57
24	Czech Republic	Miroslav Sajler; Pavel Dudr; Pavel Faschingbauer	3:19:36
25	Lithuania	Ceslovas Kundrotas; Pavelas Fedorenko; Arunas Balciunas	3:20:26
26	Lebanon	Ali Awad; Mehdi Chebli; Omar Abdel Latif	3:27:20
27	India	Room Singh; Hari Singh; Raj Pal	3:32:43
28	Mauritius	Menon Ramsamy; Eric Vamben; Judex Durhone	3:35:57
29	Croatia	Josip Lacković; Drago Paripović; Robert Prejnjak	3:36:34
—	Turkmenistan	Charygeldiy Allaberdiyev; Dovletmomed Nazarov; Parakhat Kurtgeldiyev	DNF

=== Women's ===
Rank	Country	Team	Time
1st place, gold medalist(s)	Kenya	Tegla Loroupe; Joyce Chepchumba; Leah Malot	3:29:43
2nd place, silver medalist(s)	Romania	Lidia Șimon; Cristina Pomacu; Constantina Diţă-Tomescu	3:32:19
3rd place, bronze medalist(s)	Spain	Julia Vaquero; María Luisa Lárraga; Rocío Ríos	3:34:18
4	Russia	Alina Ivanova; Svetlana Zakharova; Firiya Sultanova-Zhdanova	3:34:37
5	Japan	Yukiko Okamoto; Kazumi Matsuo; Mayumi Ichikawa	3:36:18
6	Italy	Maria Guida; Lucilla Andreucci; Franca Fiacconi	3:36:42
7	South Africa	Elana Meyer; Nicole Whiteford; Marietjie McDermott	3:37:17
8	France	Rakiya Maraoui; Zahia Dahmani; Annick Clouvel	3:38:13
9	Germany	Sylvia Renz; Maren Östringer; Birgit Jerschabek	3:40:18
10	Switzerland	Franziska Rochat; Daria Nauer; Ursula Jeitziner	3:40:52
11	Ethiopia	Asha Gigi; Leila Aman; Elsabet Truneh	3:41:02
12	Portugal	Albertina Dias; Rosa Oliveira; Fátima Cabral	3:41:05
13	United States	Jody Hawkins; Shelly Steely; Christine McNamara	3:41:45
14	Belarus	Galina Karnatsevich/Baruk; Yelena Mazovka; Yelena Makolova	3:44:34
15	Great Britain	Liz Yelling/Talbot; Debbie Percival; Alison Wyeth	3:48:15
16	Yugoslavia	Olivera Jevtić; Mirjana Glisovic; Suzana Čirić	3:49:04
17	Czech Republic	Alena Peterková; Dita Hebelková; Irena Šádková	3:52:58
18	Zambia	Mable Chiwama; Chanda Mwansa; Jean Mpundu	4:01:43

== Participation ==
The participation of 236 athletes (139 men/97 women) from 54 countries is reported.

- Angola (1)
- Argentina (1)
- Belarus (5)
- Bosnia and Herzegovina (1)
- Brazil (5)
- Cape Verde (1)
- China (2)
- Colombia (6)
- Croatia (5)
- Czech Republic (7)
- Denmark (3)
- Equatorial Guinea (2)
- Estonia (3)
- Ethiopia (10)
- Finland (2)
- France (10)
- Germany (9)
- Gibraltar (2)
- Hungary (1)
- Iceland (1)
- India (5)
- Israel (1)
- Italy (10)
- Japan (9)
- Kenya (10)
- Kyrgyzstan (2)
- Lebanon (3)
- Libya (1)
- Liechtenstein (1)
- Lithuania (5)
- Madagascar (1)
- Mauritius (3)
- Morocco (1)
- Netherlands (5)
- New Zealand (6)
- Poland (4)
- Portugal (8)
- Romania (5)
- Russia (4)
- Rwanda (3)
- Slovakia (2)
- South Africa (9)
- Spain (8)
- Swaziland (1)
- Sweden (1)
- Switzerland (10)
- Tanzania (3)
- Turkmenistan (4)
- Uganda (4)
- United Kingdom (5)
- United States (10)
- Yugoslavia (6)
- Zambia (6)
- Zimbabwe (3)

== See also ==
- 1998 in athletics (track and field)
