= Andreucci =

Andreucci is an Italian surname, derived from Andrea (Andrew). Notable people with the surname include:

- Chris Andreucci (born 1998), Scottish country music singer/songwriter
- Florinda Andreucci (born 1969), former Italian female long-distance runner
- Lucilla Andreucci (born 1969), Italian former female long-distance runner
- Martius Andreucci (died 1623), Roman Catholic prelate who served as Bishop of Trogir
- Paolo Andreucci (born 1965), Italian rally driver
