= Mluleki Nobanda =

South African long-distance runner

Medal record

Men's athletics

Representing South Africa

IAAF World Half Marathon Championships
Gold medal – first place	1999 Palermo	Team

Mluleki Nobanda (born 15 November 1968) is a South African long-distance runner who competes in half marathons and marathons. He was a team gold medallist at the 1999 IAAF World Half Marathon Championships with Hendrick Ramaala and Abner Chipu after finishing tenth with a personal best time of 62:17 minutes.

He has won marathons in three continents, having taken the Belgrade Marathon in 2001, Taipei International Marathon in 2002, and numerous marathons in South Africa. He has also won the prestigious 56 km Two Oceans Marathon. He achieved his personal best at the 1999 Reims Marathon, running a time of 2:12:13 hours for third. He won the Cape Town Marathon in 2007 at the age of 39.

== International competitions ==
Year	Competition	Venue	Position	Event	Notes
1998	Commonwealth Games	Kuala Lumpur, Malaysia	16th	Marathon	2:28:47
1999	World Half Marathon Championships	Palermo, Italy	10th	Half marathon	1:02:17
1999	World Half Marathon Championships	Palermo, Italy	1st	Half marathon	3:06:01

== Circuit wins ==
- Cape Town Marathon: 2007
- Two Oceans Marathon: 2003
- Taipei International Marathon: 2002
- Belgrade Marathon: 2001
- Soweto Marathon: 2001

== Personal bests ==
- Half marathon – 1:02:17 (1999)
- Marathon – 2:12:13 (1999)
