= Athletics at the 1997 Summer Universiade – Women's 5000 metres =

The women's 5000 metres event at the 1997 Summer Universiade was held at the Stadio Cibali in Catania, Italy on 26 August.

== Results ==
Rank	Athlete	Nationality	Time	Notes
1st place, gold medalist(s)	Nnenna Lynch	United States	15:47.61	
2nd place, silver medalist(s)	Lori Durward	Canada	15:48.68	
3rd place, bronze medalist(s)	Sarah Howell	Canada	15:49.96	
4	Cristina Iloc	Romania	15:52.43	
5	Kristin Ihle	United States	16:03.73	
6	Miwako Yamanaka	Japan	16:07.38	
7	Melissa Moon	New Zealand	16:13.06	
8	Stine Larsen	Norway	16:15.95	
9	Sunita Rani	India	16:21.59	
10	Maggie Chan Man Yee	Hong Kong	16:51.73	
11	Khadija Karaoui	Morocco	16:58.57	
12	Margaret Awuma	Uganda	17:35.02	
13	Svetlana Svekla	Moldova	17:42.97	
14	Essalha Anibi	Morocco	17:51.61	
	Mari Sotani	Japan	DNF	
