= Marathon de La Rochelle =

Annual road running event

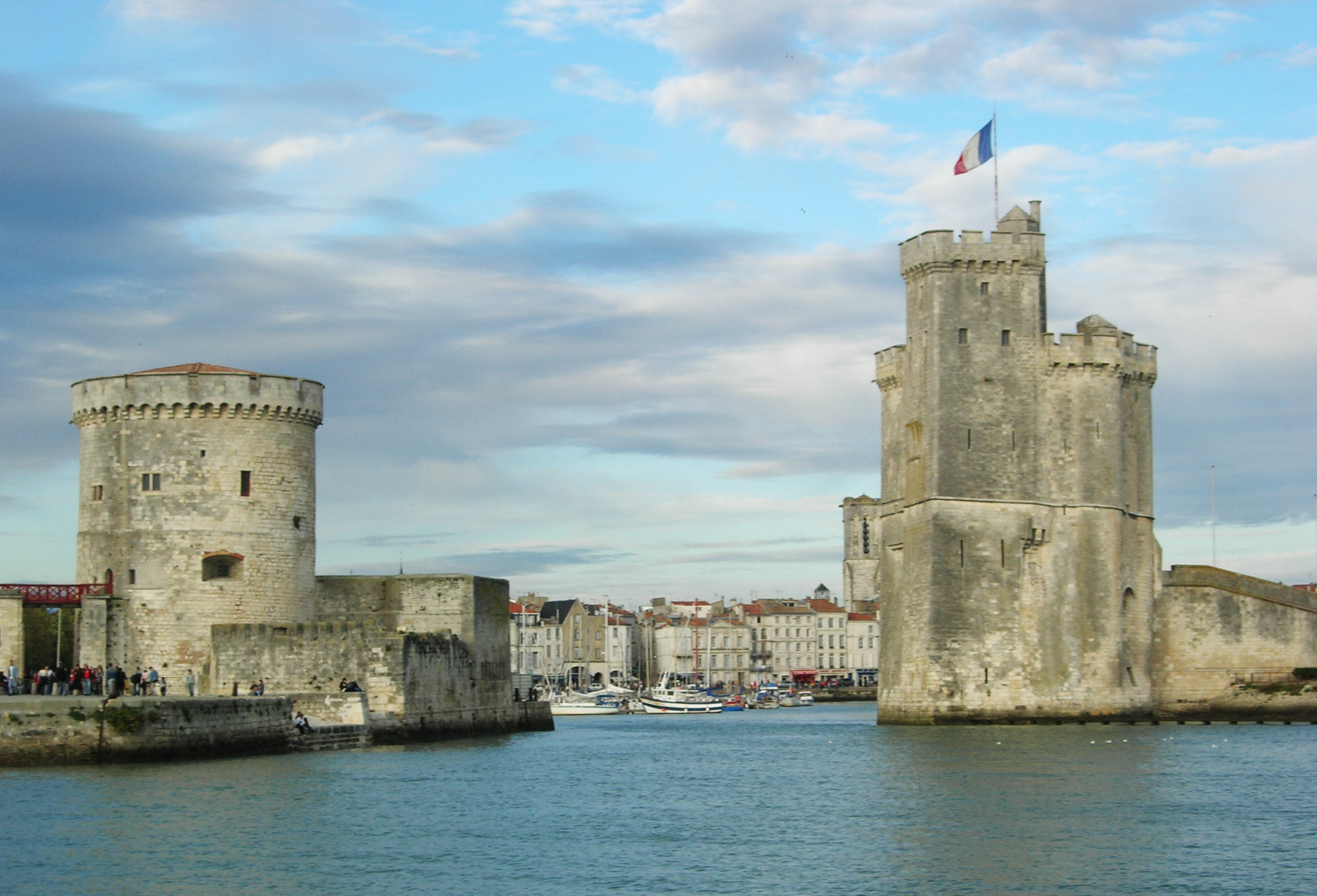
- The course goes through La Rochelle's historic port
- Date: Late November
- Location: La Rochelle, France
- Event type: Road
- Distance: Marathon
- Established: 1991
- Course records: Men: 2:07:13 (2011) (Kenya) John Komen; Women: 2:23:38 (2021) (Kenya) Celestine Chepchirchir
- Website: Marathon de La Rochelle
- Participants: 6,611 finishers (2021); 5,167 (2019); 6,091 (2018)

The Marathon de La Rochelle is an annual road running event which takes place in late November in La Rochelle, France. It features a full 42.195 km marathon race as well a 10 km race for amateur runners, a half marathon for wheelchair athletes, and a recreational 4 km jog around the city's harbour.

The city of La Rochelle had its first marathon race in 1981. This competition, which featured winners such as Driss Dacha, lasted until 1989 (with shorter 20 km races occurring in 1983 to 1985). Following the absence of a race in 1990, the Marathon de La Rochelle was established in its place, having its first edition on 24 November, 1991. The marathon is one of the most popular in France, having had a record high of 10,000 entrants and 8625 finishers at the 20th edition in 2010. Among French races, only the Paris Marathon has had greater participation.

Following the sudden death of Serge Vigot, the race founder and president of the organising committee, during the 2005 Marrakech Marathon, the event was officially renamed the Marathon De La Rochelle - Serge Vigot in his honour.

The race held IAAF Bronze Label Road Race status in 2011.

The course of the race is based on the streets of the central and historical port areas of the city. It has a double-looped figure-8 format and a flat race profile, which makes it easier for elite runners to record fast times. The runners in the marathon are predominantly French, but the elite level races attract East African and other European athletes. The total annual prize money available is typically around 37,000€.

The current men's and women's course records are held by Kenya's John Kipkorir Komen (2:07:13 hours) and Goitetom Haftu Tesema of Ethiopia (2:28:24 hours), respectively. The most successful athletes historically at the race are John Ngeny (who won three times straight from 2000 to 2002) and Elizabeth Chemweno (who won three times between 2005 and 2008).

== Past winners ==
Key: Course record

Edition	Year	Men's winner	Time (h:m:s)	Women's winner	Time (h:m:s)
1st	1991	Herve Bouffaux (FRA)	2:23:18	Claudine Golfieri (FRA)	2:53:32
2nd	1992	El Hadi Moumou (FRA)	2:20:31	Galina Ikonnikova (RUS)	2:42:54
3rd	1993	Nourredine Sobhi (FRA)	2:19:19	Anuța Cătună (ROM)	2:37:02
4th	1994	Gilles Diehl (FRA)	2:19:27	Natalia Charanova (RUS)	2:44:52
5th	1995	Andrey Tarasov (RUS)	2:17:11	Annie Coathalem (FRA)	2:40:44
6th	1996	Viktor Rogovoy (UKR)	2:16:14	Irina Permitina (RUS)	2:38:39
7th	1997	Igor Osmak (UKR)	2:17:10	Marina Ivanova (RUS)	2:42:22
8th	1998	Viktor Rogovoy (UKR)	2:15:43	Marina Ivanova (RUS)	2:38:34
9th	1999	Aleksandr Krestyaninov (UKR)	2:15:45	Evelyne Murat (FRA)	2:41:54
10th	2000	John Ngeny (KEN)	2:18:35	Valentina Lunyegova (RUS)	2:40:03
11th	2001	John Ngeny (KEN)	2:16:19	Valentina Enachi (MDA)	2:35:42
12th	2002	John Ngeny (KEN)	2:17:11	Valentina Enachi (MDA)	2:38:55
13th	2003	Elijah Yator (KEN)	2:11:34	Helena Javornik (SLO)	2:31:54
14th	2004	Stephen Rerimoi (KEN)	2:16:08	Halina Karnatsevich (BLR)	2:39:24
15th	2005	Eliud Kurgat (KEN)	2:12:17	Elizabeth Chemweno (KEN)	2:34:50
16th	2006	Peter Biwott (KEN)	2:14:01	Elizabeth Chemweno (KEN)	2:37:58
17th	2007	Johnstone Chebii (KEN)	2:14:17	Flora Kandie (KEN)	2:37:12
18th	2008	Amersisa Ketema (ETH)	2:14:21	Elizabeth Chemweno (KEN)	2:34:52
19th	2009	Oleksandr Sitkovskyy (UKR)	2:10:27	Getnet Selomie (ETH)	2:33:28
20th	2010	Haile Haja (ETH)	2:09:44	Goitetom Haftu (ETH)	2:28:24
21st	2011	John Komen (KEN)	2:07:13	Ture Chaltu (ETH)	2:36:04
22nd	2012	Ishhimael Chemtan (KEN)	2:09:12	Zherfe Boku (ETH)	2:32:59
23rd	2013	Isaac Kosgei (KEN)	2:12:28	Zherfe Boku (ETH)	2:38:00
24th	2014	Afewerk Mesfin (ETH)	2:12:16	Peninah Arusei (KEN)	2:33:10
25th	2015	Norbert Kigen (KEN)	2:09:25	Bekelech Daba (ETH)	2:32:11
26th	2016	Emmanuel Oliaulo (KEN)	2:10:46	Jane Moraa (KEN)	2:30:51
27th	2017	Workneh Tesfa (ETH)	2:11:07	Susan Kipsang (KEN)	2:30:57
28th	2018	Alex Saekwo (KEN)	2:13:23	Beth Muthoni (KEN)	2:40:08
29th	2019	Emmanuel Oliaulo (KEN)	2:08:22	Marion Kibor (KEN)	2:29:51
30th	2021	Edwin Soi (KEN)	2:09:16	Celestine Chepchirchir (KEN)	2:23:38

=== Wins by country ===
Country	Men's race	Women's race	Total
Kenya	16	10	26
Ethiopia	4	6	10
France	4	3	7
Russia	1	6	7
Ukraine	5	0	5
Moldova	0	2	2
Belarus	0	1	1
Romania	0	1	1
Slovenia	0	1	1
