= Bhembe =

Bhembe is a surname. Notable people with the surname include:

- Lucky Bhembe (born 1973), Liswati athlete
- Mfanafuthi Bhembe (born 1982), Liswati footballer
