= Alemitu Bekele =

Alemitu Bekele is the name of

- Alemitu Bekele Aga (born 1978), Belgian marathon runner of Ethiopian descent
- Alemitu Bekele Degfa (born 1977), Turkish middle and long-distance runner of Ethiopian descent
