= Fátima Silva =

Portuguese long-distance runner

Fátima Silva (born May 6, 1970) is a female long-distance runner from Portugal. She set her personal best (2:32:01) in the marathon in 2002 (Hamburg).

== Achievements ==
Year	Competition	Venue	Position	Event	Notes
Representing Portugal
1999	Paris Marathon	Paris, France	11th	Marathon	2:36:10
1999	World Championships	Seville, Spain	31st	Marathon	2:42:55
2000	Lisbon Marathon	Lisbon, Portugal	1st	Marathon	2:34:29
2001	Lisbon Marathon	Lisbon, Portugal	2nd	Marathon	2:35:16
2002	Hamburg Marathon	Hamburg, Germany	3rd	Marathon	2:32:01
2002	European Championships	Munich, Germany	19th	Marathon	2:47:28
2002	Lisbon Marathon	Lisbon, Portugal	1st	Marathon	2:35:07
2003	Hamburg Marathon	Hamburg, Germany	8th	Marathon	2:32:57
2003	World Championships	Paris, France	50th	Marathon	2:40:59
2004	Valence Marathon	Valence, France	2nd	Marathon	2:51:15
2004	Lisbon Marathon	Lisbon, Portugal	1st	Marathon	2:38:59
2005	Porto Marathon	Porto, Portugal	1st	Marathon	2:45:09
2005	Lisbon Marathon	Lisbon, Portugal	2nd	Marathon	2:45:44
2006	European Championships	Gothenburg, Sweden	—	Marathon	DNF
2006	Lisbon Marathon	Lisbon, Portugal	1st	Marathon	2:40:00
2008	Lisbon Marathon	Lisbon, Portugal	3rd	Marathon	2:53:55
