= Oliver Mintzlaff =

German athletics competitor

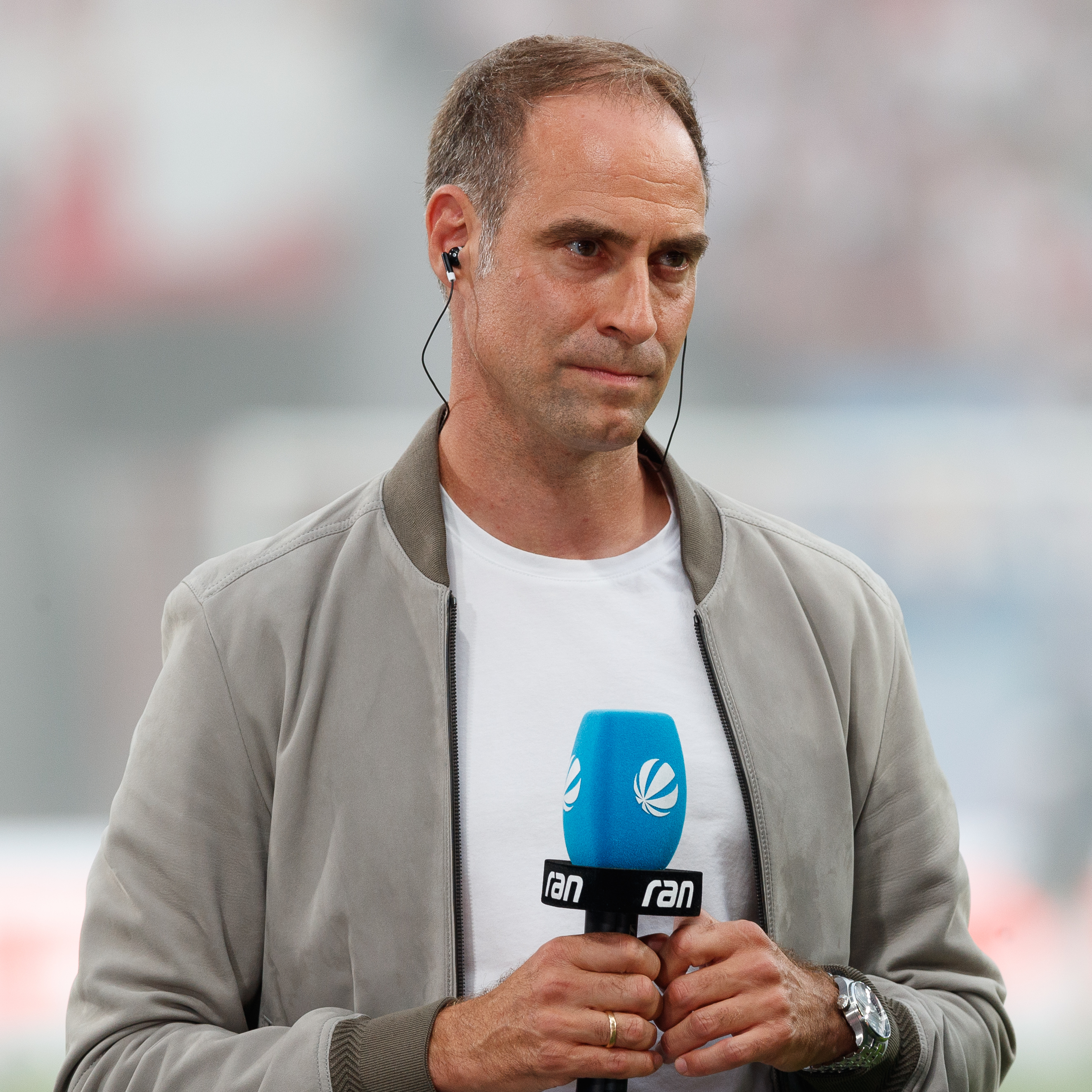
- Mintzlaff in 2022
- Born: 19 August 1975 (age 50); Bonn, West Germany
- Title: CEO of Corporate Projects and New Investments of Red Bull
- Term: 2022–present

Oliver Mintzlaff (born 19 August 1975) is a German businessman and former football official, who is CEO of Corporate Projects and New Investments of Red Bull GmbH, former CEO of RB Leipzig, and a former long-distance runner.

== Career ==
=== Running ===
Oliver Mintzlaff participated twice in the half marathon world championships: he finished 70th at the 1998 IAAF World Half Marathon Championships in Uster, 80th at the 1999 IAAF World Half Marathon Championships in Palermo.

A Cross Country specialist, he was included six times on the German squad at the European Cross Country Championships, with the following rankings:

- 2000 in Malmö: 49
- 2001 in Thun: 55
- 2002 in Medulin: 51
- 2003 in Edinburgh: 39
- 2004 in Heringsdorf: 58
- 2005 in Tilburg: 53

He finished fifth at the 1999 German Championships in the half marathon and 2001 eighth at the German championships in 10-km road race. At the German Championships in 10,000-meter race in 2000 he was ninth and 2002 fourth. In 2005, he won the 10-km competition of the coastal marathons and was German Vice Champion in Cross Country.

=== Marketing ===
From 2000 to 2008 he worked for the sports goods manufacturer Puma, most recently as Head of the Sports Marketing. Since then he has been a managing director for Ferber Marketing, where he advised footballer and manager Ralf Rangnick, the long-distance runner Sabrina Mockenhaupt and the pop singer Andrea Berg.

=== Football ===
Around 1 January 2014 Mintzlaff began working under Red Bull "Head of Global Soccer" Gerard Houllier, where he coordinated the group's football activities. On 12 June 2014 he was appointed CEO of RB Leipzig. After a double ascent RB Leipzig is currently playing in the 1. Bundesliga.

Sometime in January 2015 Mintzlaff began operating as the Red Bull "Head of Global Soccer", replacing Houllier but retaining his predecessor as an advisor.
