= Hari Singh (athlete) =

Indian long-distance runner

Hari Singh (born 1961) is a former marathon runner from India.

He ran at the 1987 World Championships in Athletics and finished in 42nd among 67 entrants in the men's marathon with a time of 2:34:20.

He also competed at the 1998 IAAF World Half Marathon Championships, finishing in 123rd with a time of 1:10:58.
