= Athletics at the 1997 Summer Universiade – Women's 10,000 metres =

The women's 10,000 metres event at the 1997 Summer Universiade was held at the Stadio Cibali in Catania, Italy on 29 August.

== Results ==
| Rank | Athlete | Nationality | Time | Notes |
|---|---|---|---|---|
| 1st place, gold medalist(s) | Deena Drossin | United States | 33:45.31 | |
| 2nd place, silver medalist(s) | Lucilla Andreucci | Italy | 33:54.22 | |
| 3rd place, bronze medalist(s) | Miwako Yamanaka | Japan | 34:10.28 | |
| 4 | Stine Larsen | Norway | 34:15.65 | |
| 5 | Melissa Moon | New Zealand | 34:38.88 | |
| 6 | Ursula Jetziner | Switzerland | 34:46.46 | |
| 7 | Leone Justino da Silva | Brazil | 36:14.23 | |
| | Annemette Jensen | Denmark | DNS | |
