= Makiko Ito =

Japanese marathon runner

Makiko Ito (Japanese: 伊藤 真貴子; born 18 January 1973) is a Japanese female former long-distance runner who specialised in the marathon. She represented her country at the IAAF World Half Marathon Championships in 1997. Her greatest achievement was a win at the Tokyo Women's Marathon in 1997. She achieved her career best time that year at the Rotterdam Marathon, recording 2:26:03 for third place.

From Kazuno, Akita, her entire career came in the 1990s. She also had top five finishes at the Nagoya Women's Marathon, Sapporo Half Marathon and Hokkaido Marathon. She was the 1998 winner of the Otawara Marathon, in a course record of 2:38:20 hours.

== International competitions ==
Year	Competition	Venue	Position	Event	Notes
1997	World Half Marathon Championships	Košice, Slovakia	23rd	Half marathon	1:12:08
