= Fleet Half Marathon =

- Date: March
- Location: Fleet, Hampshire
- Event type: Road
- Distance: Half marathon
- Established: 1982; 44 years ago
- Course records: 1:02:47 (men); 1:11:44 (women)
- Website: fleethalfmarathon.com

The Fleet Half Marathon is an annual road running event held in Fleet, Hampshire, United Kingdom. It is organised by Fleet & Crookham AC and is currently sponsored by ASICS.

The race is branded as the 'Pre-London' half marathon due to its location in the running calendar prior to the London Marathon. However, in 2018 due to snow the event was cancelled and eventually took place a week after the London Marathon.

== Past winners ==
Edition	Date	Time (h:m:s)	Men's winner	Time (h:m:s)	Women's winner
40	24 Mar 2024	1:05:06	Sam Bramwell	1:16:10	Georgie Bruinvels
39	26 Mar 2023	1:06:03	Kurt Taylor	1:17:13	Claire Jacobs
38	20 Mar 2022	1:06:49	Kurt Taylor	1:19:00	Jenna McGrevey
37	17 Mar 2019	1:07:34	James Bellward	1:18:29	Lesley Locks
36	29 Apr 2018	1:09:36	Robert Wood	1:21:54	Helen Cozens
35	19 Mar 2017	1:07:21	Michael Kallenberg	1:20:59	Lesley Locks
34	20 Mar 2016	1:07:49	Michael Kallenberg	1:22:53	Melissa Woodward
33	22 Mar 2015	1:07:49	Michael Kallenberg	1:15:44	Stacey Ward
32	16 Mar 2014	1:10:01	Gareth Watkins	1:19:44	Annabel Granger
31	17 Mar 2013	1:11:36	Matthew Blunden	1:16:36	Liz Cocks
30	25 Mar 2012	1:06:21	Ben Livesey	1:19:29	Claire Martin
29	20 Mar 2011	1:06:22	Toby Lambert	1:18:24	Sarah Harris
28	21 Mar 2010	1:11:14	Martin Shore	1:19:59	Laura Parsonage
27	15 Mar 2009	1:10:48	Matthew Blunden	1:17:49	Victoria Gill
26	16 Mar 2008	1:10:14	Neil Chisholm	1:20:43	Helen Decker
25	11 Mar 2007	1:06:03	Marks Miles	1:17:53	Jo Kelsey
24	19 Mar 2006	1:09:09	Toby Lambert	1:18:47	Debbie Coslett
23	20 Mar 2005	1:06:18	Haggai Chepkwony	1:21:37	Erica Sheldon
22	14 Mar 2004	1:08:00	Haggai Chepkwony	1:18:14	Amy Stiles
21	16 Mar 2003	1:08:35	Ron Adams	1:17:16	Louise Watson
20	17 Mar 2002	1:06:26	Haggai Chepkwony	1:26:21	Pippa Major
	18 Mar 2001	Cancelled			
19	19 Mar 2000	1:04:40	Mark Steinle	1:18:57	Debbie Gunning
18	21 Mar 1999	1:07:23	Stuart Hall	1:18:00	Jo Lodge
17	22 Mar 1998	1:06:47	Rodney Finch	1:14:31	Debbie Percival
16	23 Mar 1997	1:03:37	Gary Staines	1:12:35	Marian Sutton
15	24 Mar 1996	1:03:42	Stephen Brace	1:16:59	Paula Fudge
14	19 Mar 1995	1:07:24	Alan Shephard	1:20:25	Mandy Ayling
13	20 Mar 1994	1:06:31	Mike Gormley	1:14:05	Teresa Dyer
12	21 Mar 1993	1:05:47	William Foster	1:16:41	Alison Rose
11	22 Mar 1992	1:02:47	William Dee	1:15:42	Paula Fudge
10	24 Mar 1991	1:02:58	Christopher Robison	1:13:17	Angela Hulley
9	25 Mar 1990	1:04:57	William Dee	1:13:44	Nicola Morris
8	19 Mar 1989	1:06:01	Mike Boyle	1:14:34	Nicola Morris
7	27 Mar 1988	1:04:37	Jerry Kiernan	1:12:16	Ann Ford
6	29 Mar 1987	1:02:54	Steve Jones	1:11:44	Jill Clarke
5	23 Mar 1986	1:04:07	Roger Hackney	1:12:47	Paula Fudge
4	24 Mar 1985	1:03:50	Bernie Ford	1:12:33	Ann Ford
3	08 Apr 1984	1:05:29	Michael Hurd	1:14:52	Karen Holdsworth
2	20 Mar 1983	1:04:34	Anthony Barlow	1:15:47	Glynis Penny
1	04 Apr 1982	1:05:32	Derek Stevens	1:12:31	Paula Fudge
