= Jo Lodge =

British long-distance runner

Joanna Lodge (born 6 January 1968 Harrogate) is a retired British long-distance runner. She represented Great Britain in the Marathon at the 2003 World Championships in Athletics and in the 1999 edition of the IAAF World Half Marathon Championships.

Lodge grew up in Liverpool and was a good club athlete at Liverpool Harriers. Her first marathon was with the uncategorised masses at the 1995 London Marathon where she finished with a respectable time of 3 hrs 9mins. A win at the 1999 Fleet Half Marathon was a precursor to representing Great Britain at the 1999 IAAF World Half Marathon Championships where she finished 48th behind compatriots Marian Sutton(22nd) and Birhan Dagne(29th).

An excellent finish in the 2002 Berlin Marathon, in a personal best time of 2:34:17 gave her a place in the British team at the 2003 World Championships in Athletics in Paris. As the only British competitor in the race she finished mid-field in a time of 2:37:56. The following year at the London Marathon she came home as the third British woman (13th woman overall), in a time of 2:34:49, behind emerging athlete Tracey Morris and Birhan Dagne. At the time Lodge was a member of Windsor, Slough, Eton and Hounslow Athletic Club and a teacher of art and ceramics at Gunnersbury Catholic School.

== Competition record ==
Year	Competition	Venue	Position	Event	Notes
Representing Great Britain
1999	Fleet Half Marathon	Fleet, Hampshire, UK	1st	Half Marathon	1:18:00
1999	IAAF World Half Marathon Championships	Palermo, Italy	48th	Half Marathon	1:17:36
2002	Bath Half Marathon	Bath, Somerset, UK	1st	Half Marathon	1:14.01 (PB)
2002	Berlin Marathon	Berlin, Germany	7th	Marathon	2:34:17 (PB)
2003	2003 World Championships in Athletics	Paris, France	39th	Marathon	2:37:56
2004	London Marathon	London, United Kingdom	13th	Marathon	2:34:49
