= Lisbon Marathon =

Annual marathon held in Lisbon, Portugal

- Date: October
- Location: Lisbon, Portugal
- Event type: Road
- Distance: 42 km
- Primary sponsor: EDP
- Established: 1986
- Course records: Men's: 2:05:52 (2021) (Ethiopia) Andualem Shiferaw; Women's: 2:24:13 (2016) (Kenya) Sarah Chepchirchir
- Website: Lisbon Marathon
- Participants: 1,887 finishers (2021)

The Lisbon Marathon or the EDP Lisbon Marathon is an annual marathon held in Lisbon, Portugal in the month of October, established in 1986.

The Marathon starts in the beachside city of Cascais and finishes alongside the Luso Portugal Half Marathon in Lisbon. Both the marathon and half marathon (which starts on the Vasco da Gama Bridge) are IAAF Gold Standard. The marathon course is flat, fast and incredibly scenic. Both races feature live music along the course and a Finish Line Concert.

The 2020 edition of the race was postponed to 2021.10.17 due to the coronavirus pandemic.

Lisbon Marathon course map

== Winners ==
Key: Course record Portuguese championship race

Edition	Date	Men's winner	Time (h:m:s)	Women's winner	Time (h:m:s)
38th	6 October 2024	Wisley Kimeli (KEN)	2:08:33	Rael Kinyara (KEN)	2:27:11
37th	8 October 2023	Birhan Nebebew (ETH)	2:09:31	Aberu Ayana (ETH)	2:25:06
36th	9 October 2022	Andualem Shiferaw (ETH)	2:05:45	Bornes Chepkirui (KEN)	2:24:17
35th	17 October 2021	Andualem Shiferaw (ETH)	2:05:52	Bere Ayalew (ETH)	2:25:07
	2020	postponed to 2021 due to coronavirus pandemic			
34th	20 October 2019	Andualem Shiferaw (ETH)	2:05:59	Sechale Dalasa (ETH)	2:29:51
33rd	14 October 2018	Limenih Getachew (ETH)	2:07:30	Kuftu Dadiso (ETH)	2:24:56
32nd	15 October 2017	Ishhimael Chemtan (KEN)	2:10:51	Sarah Chepchirchir (KEN)	2:27:57
31st	2 October 2016	Alfred Kering (KEN)	2:10:27	Sarah Chepchirchir (KEN)	2:24:13
30th	18 October 2015	Asbel Kipsang (KEN)	2:09:26	Purity Rionoripo (KEN)	2:25:09
29th	5 October 2014	Samuel Ndungu (KEN)	2:08:21	Visiline Jepkesho (KEN)	2:26:47
28th	6 October 2013	Paul Lonyangata (KEN)	2:09:45	Agnes Kiprop (KEN)	2:31:15
27th	9 December 2012	Oleg Marusin (RUS)	2:19:02	Anabela Gomes (POR)	2:45:44
26th	4 December 2011	Vasco Azevedo (POR)	2:22:03	Anabela Tavares (POR)	2:50:19
25th	5 December 2010	Vasco Azevedo (POR)	2:23:09	Marina Kovaleva (RUS)	2:42:40
24th	6 December 2009	Vasco Azevedo (POR)	2:20:42	Yuliya Mochalova (RUS)	2:40:45
23rd	7 December 2008	Sergey Lukin (RUS)	2:17:40	Dorota Ustianowska (POL)	2:47:07
22nd	2 December 2007	Vasco Azevedo (POR)	2:19:55	Fátima Silva (POR)	2:47:49
21st	3 December 2006	Luís Filipe Jesus (POR)	2:21:08	Fátima Silva (POR)	2:40:00
20th	4 December 2005	Philip Biwott (KEN)	2:18:22	Yelena Kozhevnikova (RUS)	2:41:57
19th	5 December 2004	Philemon Kemei (KEN)	2:16:07	Fátima Silva (POR)	2:38:59
18th	7 December 2003	Luís Filipe Jesus (POR)	2:15:31	Madina Biktagirova (RUS)	2:42:06
17th	1 December 2002	Samson Kosgei (KEN)	2:15:35	Fátima Silva (POR)	2:35:07
16th	2 December 2001	Stephan Freigang (GER)	2:14:27	Claudia Dreher (GER)	2:31:01
15th	26 November 2000	William Musyoki (KEN)	2:16:10	Fátima Silva (POR)	2:34:39
14th	28 November 1999	Larbi Zéroual (FRA)	2:12:20	Judit Nagy (HUN)	2:32:22
13th	29 November 1998	Alcídio Costa (POR)	2:16:05	Christine Mallo (FRA)	2:33:46
12th	23 November 1997	William Musyoki (KEN)	2:16:32	Claudia Dreher (GER)	2:33:59
11th	24 November 1996	Nour Bile (ETH)	2:15:40	Albertina Machado (POR)	2:36:21
10th	26 November 1995	William Musyoki (KEN)	2:13:30	Birgit Jerschabek (GER)	2:28:02
9th	27 November 1994	Zbigniew Nadolski (POL)	2:11:57	Adriana Barbu (ROM)	2:32:56
8th	28 November 1993	Said Ermilli (MAR)	2:12:39	Manuela Machado (POR)	2:31:31
7th	18 October 1992	Jacob Ngunzu (KEN)	2:13:34	Yekaterina Khramenkova (BLR)	2:30:17
6th	20 October 1991	Mario Sousa (POR)	2:15:21	Rita Borralho (POR)	2:38:39
5th	21 October 1990	Antonio Godinho (POR)	2:15:25	Manuela Dias (POR)	2:40:37
4th	5 November 1989	Joaquim Silva (POR)	2:16:56	Evany Souza (BRA)	2:47:27
3rd	6 November 1988	Osmiro da Silva (BRA)	2:20:29	Janeth Mayal (BRA)	2:43:11
2nd	8 November 1987	Gualdino Viegas (POR)	2:13:59	Umbelina Nunes (POR)	3:00:56
1st	26 October 1986	Cidálio Caetano (POR)	2:16:49	Maria Lousada (POR)	3:20:26

== See also ==
- Lisbon Half Marathon
- Portugal Half Marathon
