= Atsushi Fujita =

Japanese long-distance runner

Atsushi Fujita (藤田 敦史, Fujita Atsushi; born November 6, 1976 in Shirakawa, Fukushima) is a former long-distance runner from Japan.

== Career ==
He graduated from Komazawa University, during the student has participated in Hakone Ekiden.

He won the 2000 edition of the Fukuoka Marathon, clocking 2:06:51 on December 3, 2000 – the second fastest run of 2000 after Antonio Pinto's time at the London Marathon. This also won him the Japanese title and remains the record for the national championship race. Fujita finished in sixth place (2:15:45) at the 1999 World Championships in Seville and twelfth at the 2001 World Championships in Athletics.

He also won the 2002 Seoul International Marathon and the 2007 edition of the Beppu-Ōita Marathon.

His career quietly came to an end in 2013, as in his final two performances at the Lake Biwa Marathon and the Nagano Marathon, he did not finish the distance.

In 2015 Fujita returned with a win at the Ishigakijima Marathon in Okinawa.

== Achievements ==
Year	Competition	Venue	Position	Event	Notes
Representing Japan
1998	World Half Marathon Championships	Uster, Switzerland	30th	Half Marathon	1:02:45
1999	Lake Biwa Marathon	Ōtsu, Japan	2nd	Marathon	2:10:07
1999	World Championships	Seville, Spain	6th	Marathon	2:15:45
2000	Fukuoka Marathon	Fukuoka, Japan	1st	Marathon	2:06:51
2001	World Championships	Edmonton, Canada	12th	Marathon	2:18:23
2002	Seoul Marathon	Seoul, South Korea	1st	Marathon	2:11:22
2004	Sapporo Half Marathon	Sapporo, Japan	8th	Half Marathon	1:02:12
2005	Lake Biwa Marathon	Ōtsu, Japan	10th	Marathon	2:12:30
2005	Sapporo Half Marathon	Sapporo, Japan	11th	Half Marathon	1:03:00
2005	Fukuoka Marathon	Fukuoka, Japan	3rd	Marathon	2:09:48
2006	Fukuoka Marathon	Fukuoka, Japan	8th	Marathon	2:11:50
2007	Beppu-Ōita Marathon	Beppu-Ōita, Japan	1st	Marathon	2:10:23
2007	Sapporo Half Marathon	Sapporo, Japan	6th	Half Marathon	1:02:39
2007	Fukuoka Marathon	Fukuoka, Japan	8th	Marathon	2:12:29
2009	Tokyo Marathon	Tokyo, Japan	10th	Marathon	2:14:00
2009	Berlin Marathon	Berlin, Germany	8th	Marathon	2:12:54
2011	Beppu-Ōita Marathon	Beppu-Ōita, Japan	5th	Marathon	2:12:26
2013	Lake Biwa Marathon	Ōtsu, Japan	DNF	Marathon	-
2013	Nagano Marathon	Nagano, Japan	DNF	Marathon	-
2015	Ishigakijima Marathon	Okinawa, Japan	1st	Marathon	2:39:25
