= Miwako Yamanaka =

Japanese long-distance runner

Personal information
- Born: 24 May 1978 (age 48)

Sport
- Sport: Track and field
Medal record
Representing Japan
Summer Universiade
Bronze medal – third place	1997 Catania	10,000m

Miwako Yamanaka (山中 美和子, Yamanaka Miwako; born 24 May 1978) is a retired Japanese long-distance runner. Her first and only international medal came at the 1997 Summer Universiade where she took the bronze in the 10,000 metres. She won the Kobe Women's Half Marathon in 2001, setting a personal best time of 1:08:54 for the event.

Her greatest achievements came in 2002 when she won the Fukuoka International Cross Country and went on to finish in fourth in the long race at the 2002 IAAF World Cross Country Championships. She also won the Chiba International Cross Country competition in 2005.

== Achievements ==
Year	Competition	Venue	Position	Event	Notes
Representing Japan
1996	World Junior Championships	Sydney, Australia	7th	3000m	9:09.06
1997	Universiade	Catania, Italy	3rd	10,000 m	34:10.28
2002	World Cross Country Championships	Dublin, Ireland	4th	Long race (7.974 km)	27:19
2002	World Cross Country Championships	Dublin, Ireland	4th	Team competition	67 pts

=== Personal bests ===
- 5000 metres - 15:20.58 min (2002)
- 10,000 metres - 31:32.10 min (2003)
- Half marathon - 1:08:54 hrs (2001)
