= Luís Jesus =

Portuguese long-distance runner (born 1968)

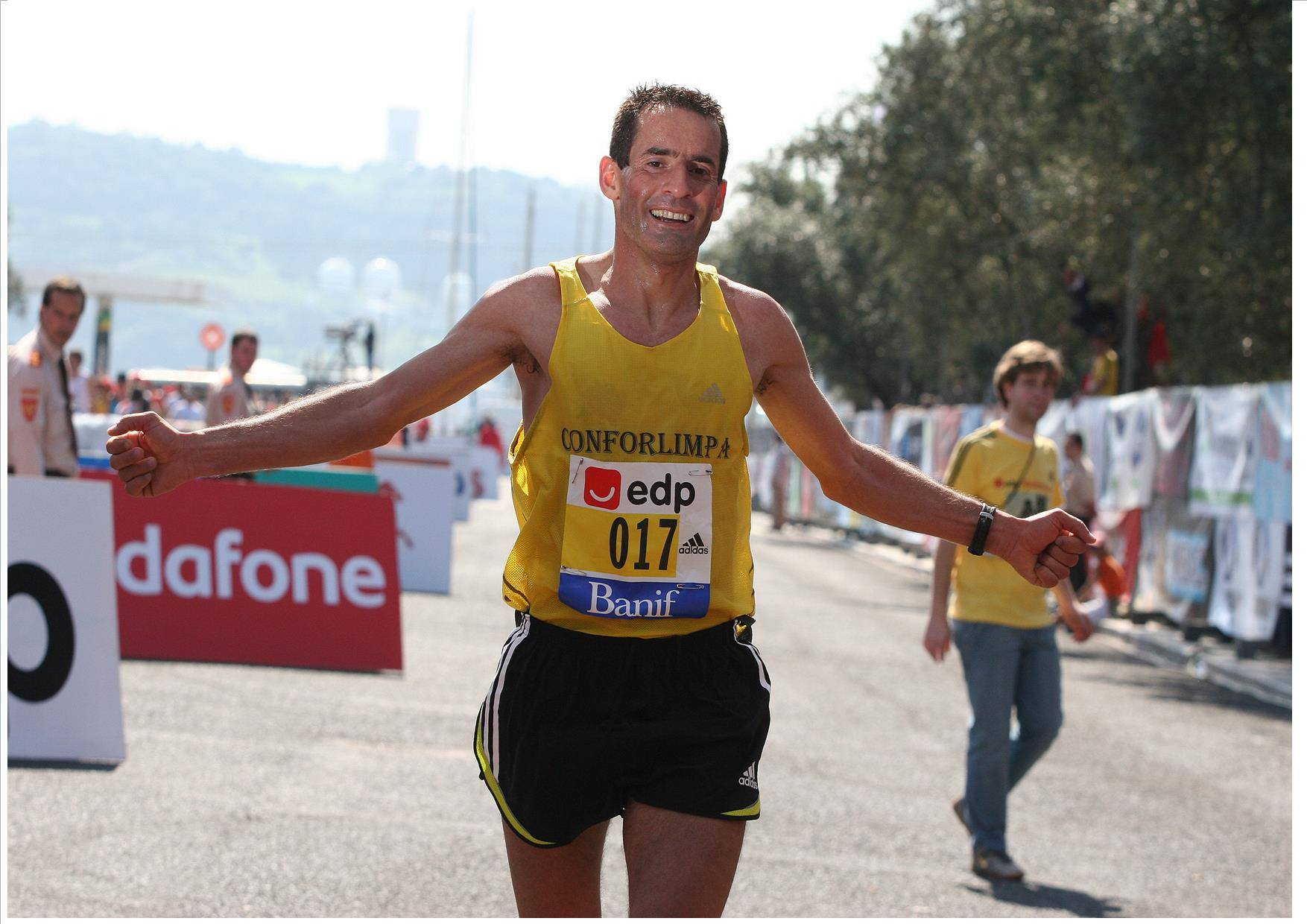
Image of Luís Jesus

Luís Filipe Jesus (born 19 November 1968) is a Portuguese long-distance runner. He set his personal best (2:08:55) in the marathon in 2006 (Paris).

He finished fourteenth in the short race at the 1998 World Cross Country Championships and seventh at the 1998 IAAF World Half Marathon Championships. In the marathon he finished eighteenth at the 2005 World Championships and tenth at the 2006 European Athletics Championships. Jesus competed in track distances at the World Championships in 1993 and 1995, without reaching the finals.

== Achievements ==
Year	Competition	Venue	Position	Event	Notes
Representing Portugal
1998	Turin Marathon	Turin, Italy	3rd	Marathon	2:12:59
2003	Lisbon Marathon	Lisbon, Portugal	1st	Marathon	2:15:31
2004	Vienna Marathon	Vienna, Austria	3rd	Marathon	2:11:24
2004	Berlin Marathon	Berlin, Germany	5th	Marathon	2:09:08
2005	World Championships	Helsinki, Finland	18th	Marathon	2:16:33
2006	Paris Marathon	Paris, France	4th	Marathon	2:08:55
2006	Lisbon Marathon	Lisbon, Portugal	1st	Marathon	2:21:08
2007	World Championships	Osaka, Japan	—	Marathon	DNS

== Personal bests ==
- 1500 metres - 3:37.43 min (1995)
- 5000 metres - 13:28.66 min (1995)
- 10,000 metres - 28:06.70 min (1993)
- Half marathon - 1:00:56 hrs (1998)
- Marathon - 2:08:55 hrs (2006)
