= Bartolomé Serrano =

Spanish long-distance runner (born 1969)

Bartolomé Serrano (born 5 March 1969 in Terrassa) is a Spanish retired long-distance runner who specialized in the half marathon.

He finished fourteenth at the 1998 World Half Marathon Championships in a personal best time of 1:01:43 hours.
