= Celestine Chepchirchir =

Kenyan long-distance runner

Personal information
- Nationality: Kenyan
- Born: December 18, 1995 (age 30) Kenya
- Occupation: Long-distance runner
- Years active: 2018–2024

Sport
- Country: Kenya
- Sport: Long-distance running
- Events: Marathon, Half marathon

Achievements and titles
- Personal bests: Marathon: 2:20:10 (Seoul, 2022); Half Marathon: 1:08:35 (Paris, 2018)

Celestine Chepchirchir (born 18 December 1995) is a Kenyan long-distance runner who has competed internationally in marathons and half marathons. She set a marathon personal best of 2:20:10 in Seoul (2022) and a half marathon best of 1:08:35 in Paris (2018).

== Career ==
In 2018, Celestine clocked 1:08:35 at the Paris Half Marathon, finishing among the leading women.

In March 2022, she delivered her strongest marathon performance to date, running 2:20:10 at the Seoul International Marathon, where she placed fourth.

The following year, in December 2023, she recorded another top finish at the prestigious Valencia Marathon, again placing fourth with a time of 2:20:46.

== Doping ban ==
In April 2024, it was announced that Celestine had been issued a three-year ban from competition after testing positive for exogenous testosterone, a prohibited substance. The ban, imposed by the Athletics Integrity Unit, took effect on 26 March 2024. All her results from 9 February 2024 onward were annulled.

The ban period was reduced by one year after Celestine admitted to the offence, a factor that contributed to the mitigation of her sanction.

== Personal bests ==
- Marathon: 2:20:10 – Seoul, 2022
- Half Marathon: 1:08:35 – Paris, 2018

== Major results ==
Year	Event	Location	Position	Time
2018	Half Marathon	Paris, France	—	1:08:35
2022	Seoul Marathon	Seoul, South Korea	4th	2:20:10
2023	Valencia Marathon	Valencia, Spain	4th	2:20:46
