= Abner Chipu =

South African long-distance runner

Abner Chipu (born 2 January 1972) is a retired South African long-distance runner. His specialties include Cross, Half Marathon, Marathon, Cross team event and the Half Marathon Team Event.

== Achievements ==
Year	Competition	Venue	Position	Notes
Representing South Africa
1997	World Championships	Athens, Greece	39th	Marathon
1998	World Half Marathon Championships	Uster, Switzerland	9th	Half marathon
1999	World Half Marathon Championships	Palermo, Italy	6th	Half marathon
1999	World Championships	Seville, Spain	46th	Marathon
2001	World Half Marathon Championships	Bristol, England	14th	Half marathon
2001	World Half Marathon Championships	Bristol, England	5th	Team competition

=== Personal bests ===
- 3000 metres – 8:10.34 min (2002)
- 10,000 metres – 28:27.94 min (2002)
- Half marathon – 1:01:15 hrs (1998)
- Marathon – 2:12:46 hrs (1999)
