= Agata Balsamo =

Italian former long-distance runner

Personal information
- Nationality: Italian
- Born: November 11, 1970 (age 55) Nicolosi, Italy

Sport
- Country: Italy
- Sport: Athletics
- Event: Long distance running
- Club: Cus Palermo

Achievements and titles
- Personal bests: 1500 m: 4:14.64 (2000); 3000 m: 8:55.03 (1996); 5000 m: 15:14.70 (1999); 10000 m: 31:56.39 (2000); Half-marathon: 1:11:58 (1999); Marathon: 2:36:57 (2001)
Medal record
Senior level (individual)
Event	1st	2nd	3rd
Universiade	0	1	0
European 10,000m Cup	0	0	1
Total	0	1	1
Summer Universiade
Silver medal – second place	1997 Catania	Half-marathon
European Junior Championships
Bronze medal – third place	1989 Varaždin	3000 m

Agata Balsamo (Nicolosi, 11 November 1970) is an Italian former long-distance runner.

== Biography ==
In her career she won 4 times the national championships.

== Achievements ==
Year	Competition	Venue	Position	Event	Performance	Notes
1999	World Half Marathon Championships	(Italy) Palermo	5th	Team	1:11.58	

== National titles ==
- 1 win in 5000 metres at the Italian Athletics Championships (2003)
- 1 win in 10000 metres at the Italian Athletics Championships (1999)
- 2 wins in cross-country at the Italian Athletics Championships (2000, 2001)

== See also ==
- Italian all-time top lists - 5000 metres
- Italian all-time top lists - 10000 metres
