= Wilbroad Axweso =

Tanzanian long-distance runner (born 1974)

Wilbroad Axweso (born 1 January 1974) is a Tanzanian retired long-distance runner.

== Career ==
In 1998, Axweso competed in the World Cross Country Championships. He came 15th place in the long race with a time of 35:15 and he came 6th place in the team competition. In the same year he also competed in World Half Marathon Championships. He came 35th place with a time of 1:02:52. In 2000, Axweso also competed in the next World Cross Country Championships. This time he placed 30th in the long race in a time of 36:53 and 5th in the team competition.

== Achievements ==
Year	Tournament	Venue	Result	Event
1998	World Cross Country Championships	Marrakesh, Morocco	15th	Long race
1998	World Cross Country Championships	Marrakesh, Morocco	6th	Team competition
