= Valentina Enachi =

Moldovan long-distance runner

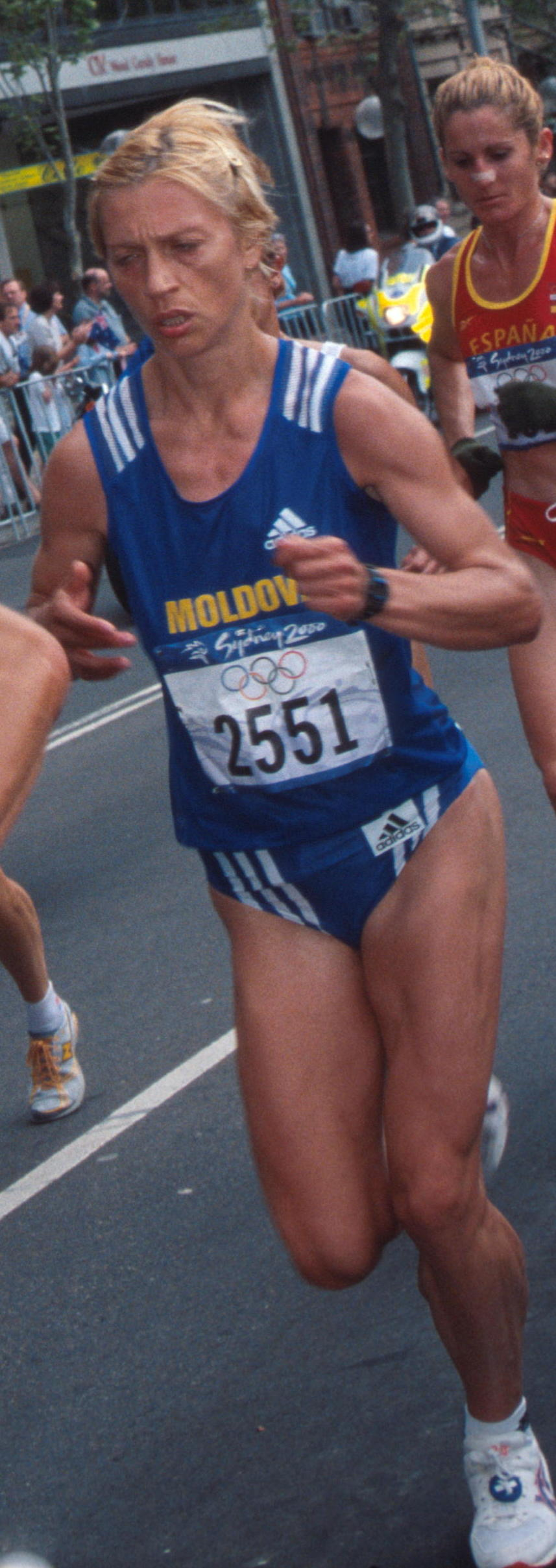
Enachi competing in the marathon, Sydney Olympics 2000

Valentina Enachi (born 15 February 1966 in Chișinău), also known as Valentina Enaki in sports world, is a Moldovan long-distance runner who specialised in road running competitions, including the marathon. She represented Moldova in the event at the 2000 Summer Olympics. She competed mostly in France and won the Tiberias Marathon, Lausanne Marathon and La Rochelle Marathon

== Career ==
Enaki began her international career representing the Soviet Union. She ran in the British 100 km Championships in 1990 and came second with a time of 8:48:39 hours. She also ran at the Tiberias Marathon that year and won the race in a little over three hours. Following the declaration of Independence of Moldova in August 1991, she represented her new country at the Crete Marathon, winning in a time of 2:50:37 hours.

She began competing on the road running circuit in France in the 1990s, winning the Futuroscope Marathon in 1994 and the 1995 Liberté Marathon in Caen with a personal best of 2:38:43 hours. She improved her best to 2:33:35 hours with a win at the Lausanne Marathon in 1995 (she went on to win a second title in 2001). In March 1996 she won the Alençon-Médavy 15.4 km race and then set a Moldovan record over 20 km with her winning time of 1:10:06 at the Maroilles 20K. Enaki was the first women's 10K winner at the Corrida de Langueux and she ran in the Olympic marathon at the 1996 Summer Olympics, albeit as an unofficial competitor. Later that season she took the women's title at the La Coulée Verte Half Marathon in Niort.

At the start of 1997, she opened her year by winning the Val Nantais Marathon and just one week after her marathon outing, she ran and won at the La Rochelle Half Marathon. A second consecutive win came at the Maroilles race and she ran course record and personal best of 2:31:22 hours to win the Lyon Marathon. She was also fifth at the Jungfrau-Marathon that year. In 1999 she won two road races: the Courses Pédestres d'Arras 10K and the Saint Pol-Morlaix Half Marathon.

Enachi came fifth at the 2000 Paris Marathon and her time of 2:33:28 hours qualified her to compete at the 2000 Sydney Olympics. She ran in her second Olympic marathon race but she didn't manage to finish the distance. Following her appearance on the Olympic stage she had back-to-back wins at the La Rochelle Marathon in 2001 and 2002. She also won the 2001 Murtenlauf and in 2002 she topped the podium at the Cannes Half Marathon and Marathon du Mont Saint-Michel (setting a career best of 2:30:06 hours at the latter competition).
