= Ursula Jeitziner =

Swiss long-distance runner

Personal information
- Nationality: Swiss
- Born: 14 March 1972 (age 54)

Sport
- Sport: Long-distance running
- Event: 10,000 metres

Ursula Jeitziner (born 14 March 1972) is a Swiss long-distance runner. She competed in the women's 10,000 metres at the 1996 Summer Olympics.
