= Susan Michelsson =

Australian long-distance runner

Personal information
- Born: 29 February 1972 (age 53)

Sport
- Country: Australia
- Sport: Long-distance running

Susan Michelsson (born 29 February 1972) is an Australian long-distance runner. She competed in the women's marathon at the 2001 World Championships in Athletics held in Edmonton, Alberta, Canada, finishing in 40th place.
