= Halina Karnatsevich =

Belarusian long-distance runner

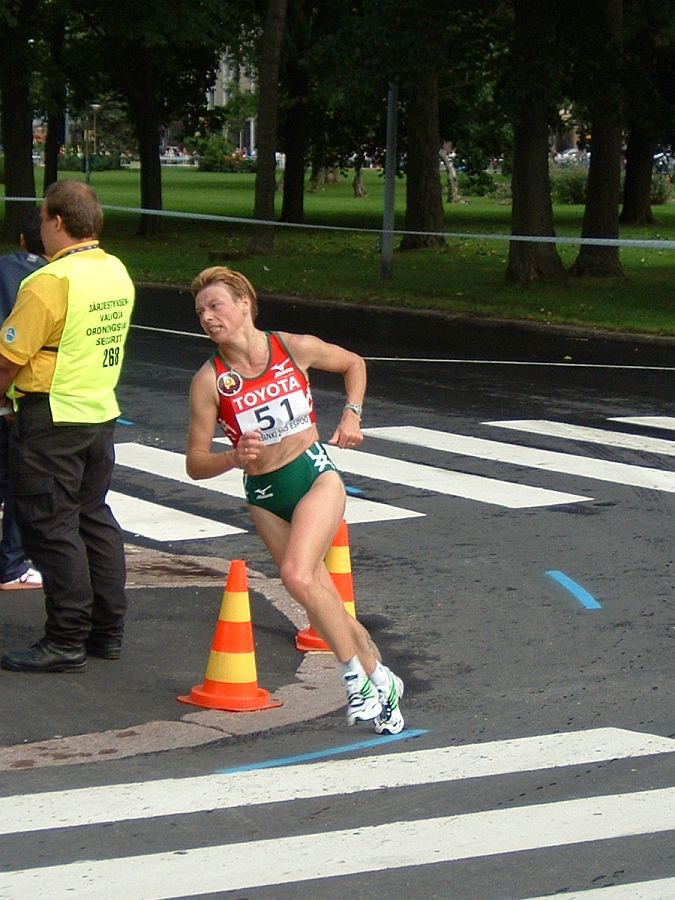
Halina Karnatsevich

Halina Karnatsevich, née Baruk (Belarusian: Галiна Карнацэвiч, born 2 November 1969) is a Belarusian long-distance runner.

She finished twelfth in the marathon at the 2005 World Championships in a personal best time of 2:27:14 hours.

In 2006 Karnatsevich was found guilty of stanozolol doping. The sample was delivered on 17 June 2006 in an in-competition test in Duluth, Minnesota, United States. She received an IAAF suspension from July 2006 to July 2008.

== Achievements ==
Year	Competition	Venue	Position	Event	Notes
Representing Belarus
1998	Reims Marathon	Reims, France	3rd	Marathon	2:36:18
1998	Hamburg Marathon	Hamburg, Germany	6th	Marathon	2:35:40
1998	European Championships	Budapest, Hungary	29th	Marathon	2:38:50
1999	Rome City Marathon	Rome, Italy	6th	Marathon	2:35:59
1999	Enschede Marathon	Enschede, Netherlands	1st	Marathon	2:37:35
1999	Eindhoven Marathon	Eindhoven, Netherlands	3rd	Marathon	2:39:14
2003	La Rochelle Marathon	La Rochelle, France	4th	Marathon	2:39:32
2005	Grandma's Marathon	Duluth, United States	1st	Marathon	2:28:43
2005	World Championships	Helsinki, Finland	12th	Marathon	2:27:14
2006	Belgrade Marathon	Belgrade, Serbia and Montenegro	1st	Marathon	2:34:35
