= Alemitu Bekele Aga =

Ethiopian long-distance runner

Alemitu Bekele Aga (born 22 August 1976) is an Ethiopian-born Belgium long-distance runner who specialized in cross-country running, half-marathon and marathon.

Alemitu Bekele is a former Belgian marathon, half marathon and 10,000 metres champion. Furthermore, she became Benelux marathon champion 2008 at the Eindhoven Marathon.

== International competitions ==
| Year | Competition | Venue | Position | Notes |
|---|---|---|---|---|
| 1998 | World Cross Country Championships | Marrakesh, Morocco | 17th | Short race |
| 1998 | World Cross Country Championships | Marrakesh, Morocco | 2nd | Team competition |
