= Lucky Bhembe =

Liswati athlete

Lucky Willie Bhembe (born 25 October 1973) is a Liswati athlete. He competed at the 2000 Summer Olympics.

== Achievements ==
Year	Competition	Venue	Position	Event	Notes
Representing Eswatini
2000	Olympic Games	Sydney, Australia	51st	Marathon	2:23:08
