= Florinda Andreucci =

Italian long-distance runner (born 1969)

Personal information
- National team: Italy (3 caps in 1998-2001)
- Born: 19 December 1969 (age 56) Rome, Italy

Sport
- Country: Italy
- Sport: Athletics
- Event: Long-distance running

Achievements and titles
- Personal best: Half marathon: 1:12:22 (2002)

Florinda Andreucci (born 19 December 1969) is a former Italian long-distance runner who competed at individual senior level at the IAAF World Half Marathon Championships.

She is the twin sister of Lucilla Andreucci, who is also a long-distance runner.

== Biography ==
Cross-country race specialist, like her twin sister Lucilla Andreucci, but with inferior results. She collected only a few appearances on the senior national team and in 2001, after switching from specializing in the half marathon to her first marathon, ever, a flash with victory in the important Florence Marathon, then a gradual decline that would lead to her premature retirement, caused by continuing physical troubles (three tendon operations).

Florinda aims hard to qualify for the 2002 European Athletics Championships, but fails in what will be her last chance to achieve excellence at the national level.
