= Michael Fietz =

German long-distance runner (born 1967)

Michael Fietz (born 13 November 1967 in Bochum, West Germany) is a long-distance runner. In 1997 he won the Frankfurt Marathon. He represented Germany at the 2000 Summer Olympics marathon in Sydney, Australia, finishing in 37th place, with a time of 2:20:09.

== Achievements ==
Year	Competition	Venue	Position	Event	Notes
Representing Germany
1997	Frankfurt Marathon	Frankfurt, Germany	1st	Marathon	2:10:59
1998	European Championships	Budapest, Hungary	19th	Marathon	2:15:53
2000	Rotterdam Marathon	Rotterdam, Netherlands	12th	Marathon	2:11:28
2000	Olympic Games	Sydney, Australia	37th	Marathon	2:20:09
