= Lucilla Andreucci =

Italian long-distance runner

Personal information
- Nationality: Italian
- Born: 19 December 1969 (age 56) Rome, Italy
- Height: 1.61 m (5 ft 3 1/2 in)
- Weight: 48 kg (106 lb)

Sport
- Country: Italy
- Sport: Athletics
- Event: Marathon
- Club: G.S. Forestale

Achievements and titles
- Personal best: Marathon: 2:29.43 (2000)
Medal record
Half Marathon World Championships
Bronze medal – third place	1996 Palma de Mallorca	Team marathon
Summer Universiade
Silver medal – second place	1997 Catania	10000 metres
International Marathons
Event	1st	2nd	3rd
Venice Marathon	1	0	1
Milan Marathon	1	0	0
Vienna Marathon	1	0	0
Padua Marathon	0	1	0

Lucilla Andreucci (born 19 December 1969 in Rome) is a former long-distance runner from Italy.

== Biography ==
She set her personal best (2:29:43) in the women's marathon on 3 December 2000 in Milan, Italy. She has 16 caps in national team from 1997 to 2007. She is the twin sister of Florinda Andreucci, she also a long-distance runner.

== Achievements ==
Year	Competition	Venue	Position	Event	Notes
1997	Universiade	Catania, Italy	2nd	10,000 m	33:54.22
1998	Venice Marathon	Venice, Italy	1st	Marathon	2:30.34
2000	Milan Marathon	Milan, Italy	1st	Marathon	2:29:43
2001	Naples Marathon	Naples, Italy	1st	Marathon	2:36:24
2003	Vienna City Marathon	Vienna, Austria	1st	Marathon	2:35:32
2003	Venice Marathon	Venice, Italy	3rd	Marathon	2:32:48
2003	World Championships	Paris, France	41st	Marathon	2:38:22
2003	Milan Marathon	Milan, Italy	4th	Marathon	2:30:21
2007	Padua Marathon	Padua, Italy	2nd	Marathon	2:33:29
2007	World Championships	Osaka, Japan	48th	Marathon	2:56:19

== National titles ==
She won five national championships at individual senior level.

- Italian Athletics Championships
  - 5000 m: 1997
  - 10,000 m: 1998
  - Half marathon: 1996, 1997, 1998
