= 1993 IAAF World Half Marathon Championships =

- Organisers: IAAF
- Edition: 2nd
- Date: October 3
- Host city: Brussels, Belgium
- Events: 3
- Participation: 254 athletes from 49 nations

The 2nd IAAF World Half Marathon Championships was held on October 3, 1993, in Brussels, Belgium. A total of 254 athletes, 133 men, 86 women and 35 juniors, from 49 countries took part. Complete results were published.

== Medallists ==
Event	Gold		Silver		Bronze	
Individual
Men	Vincent Rousseau (BEL)	1:01:06	Steve Moneghetti (AUS)	1:01:10	Carl Thackery (GBR)	1:01:13
Junior (Boys)	Meck Mothuli (RSA)	1:02:11	Beruke Bekele (ETH)	1:03:32	Isaac Radebe (RSA)	1:03:35
Women	Conceição Ferreira (POR)	1:10:07	Mari Tanigawa (JPN)	1:10:09	Tegla Loroupe (KEN)	1:10:12
Team
Team Men	Kenya	3:05:40	Australia	3:05:43	United Kingdom	3:06:10
Team Junior (Boys)	South Africa	3:09:46	Ethiopia	3:13:34	Italy	3:17:12
Team Women	Romania	3:32:18	Japan	3:32:22	Portugal	3:34:12

== Race results ==
=== Men's ===
Rank	Athlete	Nationality	Time	Notes
1st place, gold medalist(s)	Vincent Rousseau	Belgium	1:01:06	
2nd place, silver medalist(s)	Steve Moneghetti	Australia	1:01:10	
3rd place, bronze medalist(s)	Carl Thackery	Great Britain	1:01:13	
4	Lameck Aguta	Kenya	1:01:15	
5	Valdenor dos Santos	Brazil	1:01:17	
6	Antonio Silio	Argentina	1:01:35	
7	John Andrews	Australia	1:01:37	
8	Adam Motlagale	South Africa	1:01:42	
9	Rainer Wachenbrunner	Germany	1:02:00	
10	Jan Ikov	Denmark	1:02:02	
11	Kozu Akutsu	Japan	1:02:07	
12	Kidane Gebrmichael	Ethiopia	1:02:10	
13	Thomas Osano	Kenya	1:02:10	
14	Haruo Urata	Japan	1:02:12	
15	Mark Flint	Great Britain	1:02:13	
16	Joseph Cheromei	Kenya	1:02:15	
17	Graziano Calvaresi	Italy	1:02:19	
18	Akira Nakamura	Japan	1:02:21	
19	Henrique Crisostomo	Portugal	1:02:25	
20	Paul Aufdemberge	United States	1:02:30	
21	Leykun Gebremedhin	Ethiopia	1:02:31	
22	Alberto Maravilha	Portugal	1:02:32	
23	Ezael Thlobo	South Africa	1:02:38	
24	Bernd Bürger	Germany	1:02:40	
25	Davide Milesi	Italy	1:02:42	
26	Ronny Ligneel	Belgium	1:02:43	
27	Dave Lewis	Great Britain	1:02:44	
28	Mohamed Ezzher	France	1:02:45	
29	Zablon Miano	Kenya	1:02:48	
30	António Resende	Portugal	1:02:49	
31	Luigi Di Lello	Italy	1:02:49	
32	Meshack Mogotsi	South Africa	1:02:55	
33	Antonio Peña	Spain	1:02:55	
34	Fernando Couto	Portugal	1:02:56	
35	Pat Carroll	Australia	1:02:56	
36	Fransua Woldemarian	Ethiopia	1:02:57	
37	José Ramon Moreno	Spain	1:03:08	
38	Rodney Higgins	Australia	1:03:08	
39	Santtu Mäkinen	Finland	1:03:09	
40	Hoche Yaya Aden	Djibouti	1:03:09	
41	Martin Jones	Great Britain	1:03:10	
42	Luíz dos Santos	Brazil	1:03:11	
43	Gerard Kappert	Netherlands	1:03:18	
44	Ryo Watanabe	Japan	1:03:19	
45	Aiduna Aitnafa	Ethiopia	1:03:25	
46	Frank Bjørkli	Norway	1:03:29	
47	Tomix da Costa	Brazil	1:03:33	
48	Yuriy Chizhov	Russia	1:03:34	
49	Klaus-Peter Nabein	Germany	1:03:38	
50	Luís Soares	France	1:03:38	
51	Viktor Vykhrystenko	Ukraine	1:03:39	
52	Wolde Silasse Melkessa	Ethiopia	1:03:41	
53	Eddy Hellebuyck	Belgium	1:03:44	
54	Salvatore Orgiana	Italy	1:03:48	
55	Joaquim Silva	Portugal	1:03:49	
56	Omar Daher Ghadid	Djibouti	1:03:56	
57	Sergey Struganov	Russia	1:03:57	
58	Delmir dos Santos	Brazil	1:03:58	
59	Bertrand Frechard	France	1:04:01	
60	Steve Sisson	United States	1:04:02	
61	Nikolay Kerimov	Russia	1:04:02	
62	Valentin Martyniouk	Ukraine	1:04:02	
63	Azzedine Sakhri	Algeria	1:04:04	
64	Danilo Goffi	Italy	1:04:05	
65	Terje Näss	Norway	1:04:08	
66	Pascal Fetizon	France	1:04:10	
67	Daniel Held	United States	1:04:14	
68	Thierry Constantin	Switzerland	1:04:19	
69	Sergey Fedotov	Russia	1:04:28	
70	Raf Wijns	Belgium	1:04:29	
71	Vladimir Epanov	Russia	1:04:29	
72	John Griffin	Ireland	1:04:31	
73	Pierre Délèze	Switzerland	1:04:32	
74	Vladimir Bukhanov	Ukraine	1:04:43	
75	Roger Bjørkli	Norway	1:04:45	
76	Svein Erik Eide	Norway	1:04:45	
77	Steve Jones	Great Britain	1:04:52	
78	Alberto Juzdado	Spain	1:04:53	
79	Jukka Vähä-Vahe	Finland	1:04:59	
80	Mirosław Żerkowski	Poland	1:05:00	
81	Diomede Cishahayo	Burundi	1:05:03	
82	Peter De Vocht	Belgium	1:05:05	
83	Daniel Gonzalez	United States	1:05:07	
84	Axel Krippschock	Germany	1:05:15	
85	Jean-Louis Prianon	France	1:05:17	
86	Marco Gielen	Netherlands	1:05:21	
87	Nicolae Negru	Romania	1:05:22	
88	Boris Batuyev	Belarus	1:05:23	
89	Simon Mphulanyane	South Africa	1:05:33	
90	Jari Hirvonen	Finland	1:05:40	
91	Daniel Dasta	Israel	1:05:42	
92	Craig Dickson	United States	1:05:48	
93	Marcelo Cascabelo	Argentina	1:05:52	
94	Rodrigo Gavela	Spain	1:05:58	
95	Vladimir Tonchinskiy	Belarus	1:06:01	
96	Kuruppe Karunaratne	Sri Lanka	1:06:03	
97	Tom Maher	Ireland	1:06:18	
98	Mikhail Vorontsov	Belarus	1:06:23	
99	Bjørn Nordheggen	Norway	1:06:32	
100	Aart Stigter	Netherlands	1:06:50	
101	Khelil Benhalima	Algeria	1:06:53	
102	Mohamed Abdi Said	Djibouti	1:07:00	
103	Peter Handcock	New Zealand	1:07:10	
104	Aleksandrs Prokopčuks	Latvia	1:07:13	
105	David Rush	New Zealand	1:07:27	
106	Uwe Honsdorf	Germany	1:07:34	
107	Jan-Dirk Hazegeler	Netherlands	1:07:40	
108	Roy Dooney	Ireland	1:07:55	
109	Yuriy Brandes	Belarus	1:08:28	
110	Georges Richmond	French Polynesia	1:08:44	
111	Ģirts Fogels	Latvia	1:09:24	
112	Asaf Bimro	Israel	1:09:27	
113	Ajay Chuttoo	Mauritius	1:09:33	
114	Brent Halley	New Zealand	1:09:37	
115	Roland Wille	Liechtenstein	1:09:46	
116	Kavin Smith	Bermuda	1:10:08	
117	Thomas Payne	Ireland	1:10:20	
118	Lee Kar Lun	Hong Kong	1:11:23	
119	Isvans Normunds	Latvia	1:11:28	
120	Ismael Hassan	Djibouti	1:11:53	
121	Samantha Neil	Sri Lanka	1:11:57	
122	G. Susiripala	Sri Lanka	1:12:17	
123	Andrey Vasilyev	Turkmenistan	1:14:05	
124	Fung Wang Tak	Hong Kong	1:15:23	
125	Chan Hon Hung	Hong Kong	1:15:41	
126	Tracy Wright	Bermuda	1:16:26	
127	Ho Wing Fai	Hong Kong	1:17:28	
128	Makudi Mubenga	Zaire	1:19:36	
129	Andrey Pilipenko	Turkmenistan	1:20:01	
—	Kamal Kohil	Algeria	DNF	
—	Mark Carreras	Gibraltar	DNF	
—	Johannas Mabitle	South Africa	DNF	
—	Marly Sopyev	Turkmenistan	DNF	

=== Women's ===
Rank	Athlete	Nationality	Time	Notes
1st place, gold medalist(s)	Conceição Ferreira	Portugal	1:10:07	
2nd place, silver medalist(s)	Mari Tanigawa	Japan	1:10:09	
3rd place, bronze medalist(s)	Tegla Loroupe	Kenya	1:10:12	
4	Miyoko Takahashi	Japan	1:10:15	
5	Elena Murgoci	Romania	1:10:17	
6	Anuța Cătună	Romania	1:10:39	
7	Iulia Negura	Romania	1:11:22	
8	Albertina Machado	Portugal	1:11:39	
9	Adriana Barbu	Romania	1:11:52	
10	Akari Takemoto	Japan	1:11:58	
11	María Luisa Muñoz	Spain	1:12:04	
12	Suzanne Rigg	Great Britain	1:12:07	
13	Natalya Galushko	Belarus	1:12:08	
14	Annick Clouvel	France	1:12:12	
15	Rosa Oliveira	Portugal	1:12:26	
16	Julia Sakara	Zimbabwe	1:12:28	
17	Jane Salumäe	Estonia	1:12:30	
18	Martha Ernstdóttir	Iceland	1:12:33	
19	Marian Sutton	Great Britain	1:12:37	
20	Monica OʼReilly	Ireland	1:12:50	
21	Mónica Pont	Spain	1:12:53	
22	Nicole Whiteford	South Africa	1:12:55	
23	Firiya Sultanova	Russia	1:12:57	
24	Klara Kashapova	Russia	1:13:13	
25	Sara Romé	Sweden	1:13:30	
26	Tomoe Abe	Japan	1:13:31	
27	Stefanija Statkuvienė	Lithuania	1:13:34	
28	Debbi Morris	United States	1:13:40	
29	Dörte Köster	Germany	1:13:41	
30	Kerstin Herzberg	Germany	1:13:42	
31	Fatima Neves	Portugal	1:13:45	
32	Fantaye Sirak	Ethiopia	1:13:47	
33	Tatyana Pentukova	Russia	1:14:02	
34	Linda Milo	Belgium	1:14:03	
35	Jennifer Martin	United States	1:14:06	
36	Rocío Ríos	Spain	1:14:07	
37	Sue Dilnot	Great Britain	1:14:10	
38	Kerryn McCann	Australia	1:14:11	
39	Sissel Grottenberg	Norway	1:14:20	
40	Susan Hobson	Australia	1:14:24	
41	Irina Gras	France	1:14:30	
42	Rosario Murcia	France	1:14:36	
43	Marjan Freriks	Netherlands	1:14:38	
44	Tatyana Pozdnyakova	Ukraine	1:14:40	
45	Teresa Dyer	Great Britain	1:14:44	
46	Myriam Dumont	Belgium	1:14:52	
47	Tatyana Belovol	Ukraine	1:14:59	
48	Grace de Oliveira	South Africa	1:15:01	
49	Monique Ecker	United States	1:15:08	
50	Lyudmila Pushkina	Ukraine	1:15:11	
51	Anja De Brabant	Belgium	1:15:23	
52	Helle Vullings	Netherlands	1:15:29	
53	Solange de Souza	Brazil	1:15:34	
54	Cathy Schum	Ireland	1:15:36	
55	Isabelle Guillot	France	1:15:37	
56	Andrea Fleischer	Germany	1:15:50	
57	Françoise Bonnet	France	1:15:58	
58	Kelly Lopes dos Santos/de Oliveira	Brazil	1:16:25	
59	Bronwen Cardy-Wise	Great Britain	1:16:33	
60	Torhild Dybwad	Norway	1:16:36	
61	Rose Lambe	Ireland	1:16:48	
62	Radka Pátková	Czech Republic	1:16:53	
63	Yelena Makolova	Belarus	1:17:05	
64	Siska Maton	Belgium	1:17:06	
65	Jennifer Bam	South Africa	1:17:47	
66	Wilma van Onna	Netherlands	1:17:51	
67	Eryn Forbes	United States	1:18:03	
68	Asha Gigi	Ethiopia	1:19:19	
69	Nadir de Siqueira	Brazil	1:19:23	
70	Patricia Griffin	Ireland	1:19:28	
71	Galina Karnatsevich/Baruk	Belarus	1:19:46	
72	Ingrid Van Giel	Belgium	1:20:47	
73	Andrea Devine	New Zealand	1:20:52	
74	Mary Sweeney	Ireland	1:21:11	
75	Asselefech Assefa	Ethiopia	1:21:27	
76	Anna Eatherley	Bermuda	1:23:31	
77	Maisa Tcharyeva	Turkmenistan	1:23:39	
78	Ilona Lubane	Latvia	1:27:55	
79	Kristine Graudina	Latvia	1:28:31	
80	Maria Wille	Liechtenstein	1:29:43	
—	Gabriela Wolf	Germany	DNF	
—	Irena Zumromska	Latvia	DNF	
—	Debbie Sheddan	New Zealand	DNF	
—	Manuela Dias	Portugal	DNF	
—	Nadezhda Tatarenkova	Russia	DNF	
—	Jennifer Brower	United States	DNF	

=== Junior men's ===
Rank	Athlete	Nationality	Time	Notes
1st place, gold medalist(s)	Meck Mothuli	South Africa	1:02:11	
2nd place, silver medalist(s)	Beruke Bekele	Ethiopia	1:03:32	
3rd place, bronze medalist(s)	Isaac Radebe	South Africa	1:03:35	
4	Frank Pooe	South Africa	1:04:00	
5	Tegenu Abebe	Ethiopia	1:04:19	
6	Aleksey Sobolev	Russia	1:05:12	
7	Giovanni Ruggiero	Italy	1:05:21	
8	Rosario Daidoni	Italy	1:05:35	
9	Yifru Fekada Yifru	Ethiopia	1:05:43	
10	Valeriy Kuzman	Russia	1:06:12	
11	Ottaviano Andriani	Italy	1:06:16	
12	Adam Selebalo	South Africa	1:06:46	
13	Anton Nikolesko	Russia	1:07:02	
14	Antonio Andriani	Italy	1:07:08	
15	Johnny Loría	Costa Rica	1:07:14	
16	Pavel Kokin	Russia	1:07:38	
17	Alessandro Fasulo	Italy	1:07:52	
18	José María Prieto	Spain	1:08:51	
19	Aleksey Pletnev	Russia	1:09:09	
20	Péter Imre	Hungary	1:09:11	
21	Vivian Mkhize	South Africa	1:09:12	
22	Torsten Matthes	Germany	1:10:01	
23	Richard Muscat	Gibraltar	1:10:18	
24	Martins Alksnis	Latvia	1:10:36	
25	Zsolt Füleki	Hungary	1:10:54	
26	Patrick Heinlein	Germany	1:11:14	
27	Arturs Curkans	Latvia	1:11:32	
28	Andras Eso	Hungary	1:11:44	
29	Nikolaus Rama	Germany	1:11:57	
30	Zsolt Bacskai	Hungary	1:13:44	
31	Kemal Tuvakuliyev	Turkmenistan	1:15:07	
32	Tofik Inger	Turkmenistan	1:17:30	
33	Abdylesis Nurliev	Turkmenistan	1:19:03	
—	Guido Streit	Germany	DNF	
—	Ivars Lapiņš	Latvia	DNF	

== Team Results ==
=== Men's ===
Rank	Country	Team	Time
1st place, gold medalist(s)	Kenya	Lameck Aguta; Thomas Osano; Joseph Cheromei	3:05:40
2nd place, silver medalist(s)	Australia	Steve Moneghetti; John Andrews; Pat Carroll	3:05:43
3rd place, bronze medalist(s)	Great Britain	Carl Thackery; Mark Flint; Dave Lewis	3:06:10
4	Japan	Kozu Akutsu; Haruo Urata; Akira Nakamura	3:06:40
5	South Africa	Adam Motlagale; Ezael Thlobo; Meshack Mogotsi	3:07:15
6	Belgium	Vincent Rousseau; Ronny Ligneel; Eddy Hellebuyck	3:07:33
7	Ethiopia	Kidane Gebrmichael; Leykun Gebremedhin; Fransua Woldemarian	3:07:38
8	Portugal	Henrique Crisostomo; Alberto Maravilha; António Resende	3:07:46
9	Italy	Graziano Calvaresi; Davide Milesi; Luigi Di Lello	3:07:50
10	Brazil	Valdenor dos Santos; Luíz dos Santos; Tomix da Costa	3:08:01
11	Germany	Rainer Wachenbrunner; Bernd Bürger; Klaus-Peter Nabein	3:08:18
12	France	Mohamed Ezzher; Luís Soares; Bertrand Frechard	3:10:24
13	United States	Paul Aufdemberge; Steve Sisson; Daniel Held	3:10:46
14	Spain	Antonio Peña; José Ramon Moreno; Alberto Juzdado	3:10:56
15	Russia	Yuriy Chizhov; Sergey Struganov; Nikolay Kerimov	3:11:33
16	Norway	Frank Bjørkli; Terje Näss; Roger Bjørkli	3:12:22
17	Ukraine	Viktor Vykhrystenko; Valentin Martyniouk; Vladimir Bukhanov	3:12:24
18	Finland	Santtu Mäkinen; Jukka Vähä-Vahe; Jari Hirvonen	3:13:48
19	Djibouti	Hoche Yaya Aden; Omar Daher Ghadid; Mohamed Abdi Said	3:14:05
20	Netherlands	Gerard Kappert; Marco Gielen; Aart Stigter	3:15:29
21	Belarus	Boris Batuyev; Vladimir Tonchinskiy; Mikhail Vorontsov	3:17:47
22	Ireland	John Griffin; Tom Maher; Roy Dooney	3:18:44
23	New Zealand	Peter Handcock; David Rush; Brent Halley	3:24:14
24	Latvia	Aleksandrs Prokopčuks; Ģirts Fogels; Isvans Normunds	3:28:05
25	Sri Lanka	Kuruppe Karunaratne; Samantha Neil; G. Susiripala	3:30:17
26	Hong Kong	Lee Kar Lun; Fung Wang Tak; Chan Hon Hung	3:42:27
—	Algeria	Azzedine Sakhri; Khelil Benhalima; Kamal Kohil	DNF
—	Turkmenistan	Andrey Vasilyev; Andrey Pilipenko; Marly Sopyev	DNF

=== Women's ===
Rank	Country	Team	Time
1st place, gold medalist(s)	Romania	Elena Murgoci; Anuța Cătună; Iulia Negura	3:32:18
2nd place, silver medalist(s)	Japan	Mari Tanigawa; Miyoko Takahashi; Akari Takemoto	3:32:22
3rd place, bronze medalist(s)	Portugal	Conceição Ferreira; Albertina Machado; Rosa Oliveira	3:34:12
4	Great Britain	Suzanne Rigg; Marian Sutton; Sue Dilnot	3:38:54
5	Spain	María Luisa Muñoz; Mónica Pont; Rocío Ríos	3:39:04
6	Russia	Firiya Sultanova; Klara Kashapova; Tatyana Pentukova	3:40:12
7	France	Annick Clouvel; Irina Gras; Rosario Murcia	3:41:18
8	United States	Debbi Morris; Jennifer Martin; Monique Ecker	3:42:54
9	Germany	Dörte Köster; Kerstin Herzberg; Andrea Fleischer	3:43:13
10	Belgium	Linda Milo; Myriam Dumont; Anja De Brabant	3:44:18
11	Ukraine	Tatyana Pozdnyakova; Tatyana Belovol; Lyudmila Pushkina	3:44:50
12	Ireland	Monica OʼReilly; Cathy Schum; Rose Lambe	3:45:14
13	South Africa	Nicole Whiteford; Grace de Oliveira; Jennifer Bam	3:45:43
14	Netherlands	Marjan Freriks; Helle Vullings; Wilma van Onna	3:47:58
15	Belarus	Natalya Galushko; Natalya Galushko; Yelena Makolova	3:41:21
16	Brazil	Solange de Souza; Kelly Lopes dos Santos/de Oliveira; Nadir de Siqueira	3:51:22
17	Ethiopia	Fantaye Sirak; Asha Gigi; Asselefech Assefa	3:54:33
—	Latvia	Ilona Lubane; Kristine Graudina; Irena Zumromska	DNF

=== Junior men's ===
Rank	Country	Team	Time
1st place, gold medalist(s)	South Africa	Meck Mothuli; Isaac Radebe; Frank Pooe	3:09:46
2nd place, silver medalist(s)	Ethiopia	Beruke Bekele; Tegenu Abebe; Yifru Fekada Yifru	3:13:34
3rd place, bronze medalist(s)	Italy	Giovanni Ruggiero; Rosario Daidoni; Ottaviano Andriani	3:17:12
4	Russia	Aleksey Sobolev; Valeriy Kuzman; Anton Nikolesko	3:18:26
5	Hungary	Péter Imre; Zsolt Füleki; Andras Eso	3:31:49
6	Germany	Torsten Matthes; Patrick Heinlein; Nikolaus Rama	3:33:12
7	Turkmenistan	Kemal Tuvakuliyev; Tofik Inger; Abdylesis Nurliev	3:51:40
—	Latvia	Martins Alksnis; Arturs Curkans; Ivars Lapiņš	DNF

== Participation ==
The participation of 254 athletes (168 men/86 women) from 49 countries is reported.

- Algeria (3)
- Argentina (2)
- Australia (6)
- Belarus (6)
- Belgium (10)
- Bermuda (3)
- Brazil (7)
- Burundi (1)
- Costa Rica (1)
- Czech Republic (1)
- Denmark (1)
- Djibouti (4)
- Estonia (1)
- Ethiopia (11)
- Finland (3)
- France (10)
- Germany (13)
- Gibraltar (2)
- Hong Kong (4)
- Hungary (4)
- Iceland (1)
- Ireland (9)
- Israel (2)
- Italy (10)
- Japan (8)
- Kenya (5)
- Latvia (9)
- Liechtenstein (2)
- Lithuania (1)
- Mauritius (1)
- Netherlands (7)
- New Zealand (5)
- Norway (7)
- Poland (1)
- Portugal (10)
- Romania (5)
- Russia (14)
- South Africa (13)
- Spain (8)
- Sri Lanka (3)
- Sweden (1)
- Switzerland (2)
- (French Polynesia) /Tahiti (1)
- Turkmenistan (7)
- Ukraine (6)
- United Kingdom (10)
- United States (10)
- Zaire (1)
- Zimbabwe (1)

== See also ==
- 1993 in athletics (track and field)
