= Megumi Fujiwara =

Japanese long-distance runner

Medal record

Women's athletics

Representing Japan

IAAF World Half Marathon Championships
Silver medal – second place	1992 South Shields	Half marathon
Gold medal – first place	1992 South Shields	Team

Megumi Fujiwara (藤原 恵, Fujiwara Megumi; born 19 June 1969) is a Japanese former long-distance runner. Her career flourished in the early 1990s.

Her first international competition came at the 1991 IAAF World Cross Country Championships, where she came 61st in the women's senior race. She set track bests the following year, running 32:03.78 minutes in Kobe (ranking in the top 30 for the year) then a time of 68:07.6 minutes for the 20,000 m track distance, placing her in the top ten all-time women for the infrequently competed event.

Her greatest achievement followed that September when she ran at the 1992 IAAF World Half Marathon Championships and claimed the silver medal behind home favourite Liz McColgan, recording a lifetime best of 69:21 minutes for the event. The Japanese women's team including Miyoko Asahina and Eriko Asai were easily the champions, with their combined time being over two minutes faster than the British. As of 2014, this remains the only time that Japanese women have won that title.

The last prominent appearance of her career came at the Miyazaki Women's Road Race, where she was runner-up to China's Wang Xiuting.
