= Joseph Kamau =

Major Marathon medal winner

Personal information
- Born: 17 June 1969 (age 57) Rift Valley Province, Kenya
- Height: 5 ft 3 in (160 cm)
- Weight: 107 lb (49 kg)

Sport
- Country: Kenya

Achievements and titles
- Personal best(s): 10K: 27:11; 10 mile: 45:43; Half marathon: 1:01:02; Marathon: 2:10:40
Medal record
Men's athletics
Representing Kenya
IAAF World Half Marathon Championships
Gold medal – first place	1992 South Shields	Team
World Marathon Majors
Bronze medal – third place	1996 New York City	Marathon
Silver medal – second place	1997 Boston	Marathon

Joseph Kamau (also known as Joseph Kamau Njuguna, b. June 17, 1969) is a former professional long-distance runner from Kenya who finished second in the 1997 Boston Marathon and third in the 1996 New York City Marathon.

== Professional career ==
Joseph Kamau had been a professional runner since the age of 19. He was born in a small village in Kenya's Rift Valley Province. His speed while running got faster over the years and he was named to the Kenyan World Championship team in the half marathon in 1992. He finished 30th in 1:02:30 and the team (which also featured Lameck Aguta, Joseph Keino, Cosmas Ndeti, and winner Benson Masya) finished first.

His marathon personal record of 2:10:40 from New York prompted Boston news organizations and Runner's World to regard him as one of the fastest runners in the world. When he began winning U.S. road races, he was part of a cultural shift that saw top prizes going to foreign runners (often Kenyan and Ethiopian). These sweeping wins prompted many race officials and running commentators in the early to mid-1990s to suggest ways to distribute prize money not just to the first-place finishers (who were often African) but also to first-place American finishers.

The peak of his marathon career was 1996–1997. In April of '96, he made his 26.2-mile debut battling on the roads from Hopkinton, Massachusetts, to Boston with the top runners in the world. At the halfway mark, Kamau was leading the rest, clocking 1:02:01. But two miles later he was in fifth, and he finished in 30th (2:18:48) while Moses Tanui took the win in the 100th running of the race.

In November, he toed the line in the New York City Marathon on a morning with 40-degree weather and gusting wind, dueling with Tanui, Cosmas Ndeti, Turbo Tumo, Andres Espinosa, and other elites from around the world. This time, Kamau didn't fade late but led with Tumo and surprise contender Giacomo Leone, a police officer from small-town Italy. As Leone dropped a 4:44 mile at marker 25, Tumo got a step on Kamau, who kept the pressure on to earn $25,000 in a third-place finish, just 15 seconds ahead of fellow Kenyan John Kagwe (Kagwe would go on to be the '97 and '98 New York City Marathon champion).

At the 1997 Boston Marathon, Kamau had a better idea of the course's punishing Newton hills and didn't take the lead until the halfway point, which he crossed in 1:06:11. As he moved through Brookline, Massachusetts, toward the city, he traded places with Dionicio Ceron, Andre Ramos and Lameck Aguta. But into the city, Aguta passed them all and Kamau held strong on his heels. Kamau finished second in 2:10:46, just 12 seconds behind the winner. After the race, Kamau told reporters he favored the shorter distances.

Kamau has won several notable races, including the 1994 Great Scottish Run half marathon, the 1994 Auray-Vannes Half Marathon, the 1995 Falmouth Road Race, the 1995 Broad Street Run 10-mile, the 1996 Cooper River Bridge Run 10K, the 1996 Pittsburgh Great Race 10K (after coming up a few yards short in 1995), the 1996 and 1999 20K New Haven Road Race, and the 2003 Grandma's Marathon.

He is the course record holder for the Crim Festival of Races 10-mile, where he won in 1996 on a cool day. He had placed second the year before (to Thomas Osano) when they had both broken the previous record time. Kamau's 1996 win came within six seconds of breaking the world's record 10-mile time. He was fourth at 2002 the South American Marathon Championships, where he ran as a guest.

He is a two-time winner of the Philadelphia Distance Run (1995, 1996) and a three-time winner of the Long Beach Marathon (2001–3). He debuted his full marathon running skills at the Frankfurt Marathon. He has continued to receive recognition for his fast race times over the years.

== Personal records ==
30 kilometer race in Hamilton, Canada, with a time of 1:35:36, 2003

25 kilometer race in Michigan with a time of 1:18:25, 1999

Half marathon in Pennsylvania with a time of 1:01:02, 1996, PR

20 kilometers in Connecticut with a time of 58:33, 1996

10 mile in Michigan with a time of 45:43, 1996

15 kilometers in Oklahoma with a time of 42:50, 1996

10 kilometers in Pennsylvania with a time of 27:11, 1995

800 meters in Nairobi, Kenya, with a time of 1:54, 2007
