= 1992 IAAF World Half Marathon Championships =

- Organisers: IAAF
- Edition: 1st
- Date: September 19-20
- Host city: Newcastle upon Tyne to South Shields, Tyne and Wear, United Kingdom
- Events: 3
- Participation: 204 athletes from 36 nations

The 1st IAAF World Half Marathon Championships was held on September 19 and 20, 2001 in Tyneside, UK, and was run simultaneously with that year's Great North Run. A total of 204 athletes, 96 men, 84 women and 24 juniors, from 36 countries took part. Complete results were published.

Though this competition was the first of its kind, it followed on from the 1991 IAAF World Women's Road Race Championships, which was held over the 15K distance.

Some athletes ran as non-scoring members and were not officially considered part of the World Half Marathon Championships despite completing the race. For example, Paul Tergat finished 5th in 1:01:03 but was not listed in the results.

== Medallists ==
| Event | Gold | | Silver | | Bronze | |
|---|---|---|---|---|---|---|
Individual
| Men | Benson Masya (KEN) | 1:00:24 | Antonio Silio (ARG) | 1:00:40 | Boay Akonay (TAN) | 1:00:45 |
| Junior (Boys) | Kassa Tadesse (ETH) | 1:04:51 | Meck Mothuli (RSA) | 1:05:01 | Francesco Ingargiola (ITA) | 1:05:18 |
| Women | Liz McColgan (GBR) | 1:08:53 | Megumi Fujiwara (JPN) | 1:09:21 | Rosanna Munerotto (ITA) | 1:09:38 |
Team
| Team Men | Kenya | 3:02:25 | United Kingdom | 3:04:54 | Brazil | 3:05:56 |
| Team Junior (Boys) | Italy | 3:17:39 | Ethiopia | 3:18:56 | South Africa | 3:20:04 |
| Team Women | Japan | 3:30:39 | United Kingdom | 3:33:03 | Romania | 3:33:27 |

== Results ==
=== Men's ===
| Rank | Athlete | Nationality | Time | Notes |
|---|---|---|---|---|
| 1st place, gold medalist(s) | Benson Masya | Kenya | 1:00:24 | |
| 2nd place, silver medalist(s) | Antonio Silio | Argentina | 1:00:40 | |
| 3rd place, bronze medalist(s) | Boay Akonay | Tanzania | 1:00:45 | |
| 4 | Lameck Aguta | Kenya | 1:00:55 | |
| 5 | Joseph Keino | Kenya | 1:01:06 | |
| 6 | Dave Lewis | Great Britain | 1:01:17 | |
| 7 | Artur Castro | Brazil | 1:01:18 | |
| 8 | Alejandro Gómez | Spain | 1:01:20 | |
| 9 | Cosmas Ndeti | Kenya | 1:01:34 | |
| 10 | Paul Evans | Great Britain | 1:01:38 | |
| 11 | Xolile Yawa | South Africa | 1:01:48 | |
| 12 | Antoni Peña | Spain | 1:01:48 | |
| 13 | Koichi Fujita | Japan | 1:01:53 | |
| 14 | Francesco Panetta | Italy | 1:01:55 | |
| 15 | Malcolm Norwood | Australia | 1:01:56 | |
| 16 | Carl Thackery | Great Britain | 1:01:59 | |
| 17 | Bill Reifsnyder | United States | 1:02:00 | |
| 18 | Luca Barzaghi | Italy | 1:02:06 | |
| 19 | Junji Haraguchi | Japan | 1:02:08 | |
| 20 | Ronaldo da Costa | Brazil | 1:02:10 | |
| 21 | Pascal Fetizon | France | 1:02:11 | |
| 22 | Melese Feissa | Ethiopia | 1:02:14 | |
| 23 | Kamal Kohil | Algeria | 1:02:25 | |
| 24 | Delmir dos Santos | Brazil | 1:02:28 | |
| 25 | Severino Bernardini | Italy | 1:02:28 | |
| 26 | Mark Flint | Great Britain | 1:02:29 | |
| 27 | Kenjiro Jitsui | Japan | 1:02:33 | |
| 28 | Vincenzo Modica | Italy | 1:02:33 | |
| 29 | John Vermeule | Netherlands | 1:02:33 | |
| 30 | Bertrand Itsweire | France | 1:02:37 | |
| 31 | Steve Brace | Great Britain | 1:02:38 | |
| 32 | Róbert Štefko | Czechoslovakia | 1:02:41 | |
| 33 | Luigi Di Lello | Italy | 1:02:48 | |
| 34 | Hiroshi Tako | Japan | 1:02:51 | |
| 35 | James Kariuki | Kenya | 1:02:55 | |
| 36 | Marti ten Kate | Netherlands | 1:02:57 | |
| 37 | Meshack Mogotsi | South Africa | 1:03:03 | |
| 38 | Hendrik Thukwane | South Africa | 1:03:04 | |
| 39 | Alberto Juzdado | Spain | 1:03:08 | |
| 40 | Didier Bernard | France | 1:03:12 | |
| 41 | Philippe Rémond | France | 1:03:24 | |
| 42 | Gerard Kappert | Netherlands | 1:03:33 | |
| 43 | Naoto Suzuki | Japan | 1:03:33 | |
| 44 | Steffen Dittmann | Germany | 1:03:34 | |
| 45 | Carlos Bautista | Mexico | 1:03:46 | |
| 46 | Sid-Ali Sakhri | Algeria | 1:03:46 | |
| 47 | Wolde Silasse Melkessa | Ethiopia | 1:03:47 | |
| 48 | Rafael Zepeda | Mexico | 1:03:57 | |
| 49 | Ronny Ligneel | Belgium | 1:03:59 | |
| 50 | Rodrigo Gavela | Spain | 1:03:59 | |
| 51 | Gert Thys | South Africa | 1:04:03 | |
| 52 | Mirko Vindiš | Slovenia | 1:04:04 | |
| 53 | Bjørn Nordheggen | Norway | 1:04:06 | |
| 54 | Frank Bjørkli | Norway | 1:04:08 | |
| 55 | Azzedine Sakhri | Algeria | 1:04:16 | |
| 56 | Kurt Stenzel | Germany | 1:04:24 | |
| 57 | Kidane Gebrmichael | Ethiopia | 1:04:25 | |
| 58 | Chad Bennion | United States | 1:04:30 | |
| 59 | Igor Šalamun | Slovenia | 1:04:31 | |
| 60 | Noel Berkeley | Ireland | 1:04:35 | |
| 61 | Walter af Donner | Sweden | 1:04:38 | |
| 62 | Martin Vrábel | Czechoslovakia | 1:04:39 | |
| 63 | Benjamin McIntosh | United States | 1:04:39 | |
| 64 | Roy Dooney | Ireland | 1:04:41 | |
| 65 | Antonio Rapisarda | France | 1:04:45 | |
| 66 | Axel Krippschock | Germany | 1:04:45 | |
| 67 | Mohamed Selmi | Algeria | 1:04:50 | |
| 68 | Roman Kejžar | Slovenia | 1:04:51 | |
| 69 | Jan van Rijthoven | Netherlands | 1:04:52 | |
| 70 | Chaouki Achour | Algeria | 1:04:53 | |
| 71 | Matthews Motshwarateu | South Africa | 1:04:54 | |
| 72 | Amit Neʼeman | Israel | 1:04:56 | |
| 73 | Evaldo Souza | Brazil | 1:04:59 | |
| 74 | Zachariah Ditetso | Botswana | 1:05:20 | |
| 75 | Ole Hansen | Denmark | 1:05:23 | |
| 76 | Rainer Wachenbrunner | Germany | 1:05:24 | |
| 77 | Jan Korevaar | Netherlands | 1:05:46 | |
| 78 | Gerry Healy | Ireland | 1:05:46 | |
| 79 | Juan Antonio Crespo | Spain | 1:05:47 | |
| 80 | Peter Troldborg | Denmark | 1:05:48 | |
| 81 | Terje Näss | Norway | 1:05:51 | |
| 82 | Roger Bjørkli | Norway | 1:05:52 | |
| 83 | Haji Bulbula | Ethiopia | 1:05:55 | |
| 84 | Demeke Bekele | Ethiopia | 1:06:03 | |
| 85 | Ángel Vizcarrondo | Puerto Rico | 1:06:07 | |
| 86 | Herman Decoux | Belgium | 1:06:12 | |
| 87 | Tom Maher | Ireland | 1:06:22 | |
| 88 | Chris Fox | United States | 1:06:52 | |
| 89 | Kelekwang Sera | Botswana | 1:07:26 | |
| 90 | Marc Ruell | Belgium | 1:08:16 | |
| 91 | Gerard Assoman | Ivory Coast | 1:08:27 | |
| 92 | Soro Bassirima | Ivory Coast | 1:09:13 | |
| 93 | Kabo Gabaseme | Botswana | 1:12:15 | |
| 94 | Salvador García | Mexico | 1:13:19 | |
| — | Aivar Tsarski | Estonia | DNF | |
| — | Mark Plaatjes | United States | DNF | |

=== Women's ===
| Rank | Athlete | Nationality | Time | Notes |
|---|---|---|---|---|
| 1st place, gold medalist(s) | Liz McColgan | Great Britain | 1:08:53 | |
| 2nd place, silver medalist(s) | Megumi Fujiwara | Japan | 1:09:21 | |
| 3rd place, bronze medalist(s) | Rosanna Munerotto | Italy | 1:09:38 | |
| 4 | Anuța Cătună | Romania | 1:10:25 | |
| 5 | Miyoko Asahina | Japan | 1:10:27 | |
| 6 | Fatuma Roba | Ethiopia | 1:10:28 | |
| 7 | Eriko Asai | Japan | 1:10:51 | |
| 8 | Birgit Jerschabek | Germany | 1:10:53 | |
| 9 | Nadezhda Ilyina | Commonwealth of Independent States | 1:10:58 | |
| 10 | Iulia Negura | Romania | 1:10:59 | |
| 11 | Akari Takemoto | Japan | 1:11:01 | |
| 12 | Andrea Wallace | Great Britain | 1:11:21 | |
| 13 | Päivi Tikkanen | Finland | 1:11:22 | |
| 14 | Gordon Bloch | United States | 1:11:34 | |
| 15 | Joy Smith | United States | 1:11:43 | |
| 16 | Colleen de Reuck | South Africa | 1:11:46 | |
| 17 | Alena Peterková | Czechoslovakia | 1:11:53 | |
| 18 | Annick Clouvel | France | 1:11:59 | |
| 19 | Aurica Buia | Romania | 1:12:03 | |
| 20 | Diane Bussa | United States | 1:12:15 | |
| 21 | Bente Moe | Norway | 1:12:20 | |
| 22 | Marjan Freriks | Netherlands | 1:12:23 | |
| 23 | Martha Ernstdóttir | Iceland | 1:12:25 | |
| 24 | Maria Guida | Italy | 1:12:26 | |
| 25 | Galina Ikonnikova | Commonwealth of Independent States | 1:12:27 | |
| 26 | Hilde Stavik | Norway | 1:12:29 | |
| 27 | Judit Nagy | Hungary | 1:12:43 | |
| 28 | Rizoneide Vanderley | Brazil | 1:12:46 | |
| 29 | Carla Beurskens | Netherlands | 1:12:46 | |
| 30 | Tatyana Titova | Commonwealth of Independent States | 1:12:48 | |
| 31 | Suzanne Rigg | Great Britain | 1:12:49 | |
| 32 | Emma Scaunich | Italy | 1:12:53 | |
| 33 | Ritva Lemettinen | Finland | 1:12:57 | |
| 34 | Kerstin Pressler | Germany | 1:13:00 | |
| 35 | Wanda Panfil | Poland | 1:13:01 | |
| 36 | Dominique Le Pechoux | France | 1:13:09 | |
| 37 | Marian Sutton | Great Britain | 1:13:09 | |
| 38 | Adriana Barbu | Romania | 1:13:14 | |
| 39 | Rocío Ríos | Spain | 1:13:23 | |
| 40 | Susanne Nedergaard | Denmark | 1:13:25 | |
| 41 | Gabriela Wolf | Germany | 1:13:28 | |
| 42 | Grete Kirkeberg | Norway | 1:13:30 | |
| 43 | Jane Welzel | United States | 1:13:30 | |
| 44 | Tatyana Pentukova | Commonwealth of Independent States | 1:13:45 | |
| 45 | Ana Isabel Alonso | Spain | 1:13:49 | |
| 46 | Nicole Whiteford | South Africa | 1:13:53 | |
| 47 | balram maddheshiya | Ireland | 1:13:57 | |
| 48 | Debbi Morris | United States | 1:13:58 | |
| 49 | Odile Ohier | France | 1:14:04 | |
| 50 | Marianne van de Linde | Netherlands | 1:14:06 | |
| 51 | Grace de Oliveira | South Africa | 1:14:07 | |
| 52 | Soledad Castro Soliño | Spain | 1:14:08 | |
| 53 | Anita Palshøj | Denmark | 1:14:10 | |
| 54 | Anne van Schuppen | Netherlands | 1:14:14 | |
| 55 | Isabella Moretti | Switzerland | 1:14:25 | |
| 56 | Silva Vivod | Slovenia | 1:14:25 | |
| 57 | Viviany de Oliveira | Brazil | 1:14:29 | |
| 58 | Sally Eastall | Great Britain | 1:14:33 | |
| 59 | Andrea Fleischer | Germany | 1:15:17 | |
| 60 | Maria Lelut | France | 1:15:25 | |
| 61 | Sonja Laxton | South Africa | 1:15:26 | |
| 62 | Emebet Abossa | Ethiopia | 1:15:29 | |
| 63 | María Luisa Muñoz | Spain | 1:15:44 | |
| 64 | Nelly Glauser | Switzerland | 1:15:58 | |
| 65 | Sara Romé | Sweden | 1:16:07 | |
| 66 | Jocelyne Villeton | France | 1:16:19 | |
| 67 | Carmen Mingorance | Spain | 1:16:39 | |
| 68 | Marlie Marutiak | Netherlands | 1:16:47 | |
| 69 | Márta Visnyei | Hungary | 1:16:51 | |
| 70 | Gadissie Edato | Ethiopia | 1:17:09 | |
| 71 | Myriam Dumont | Belgium | 1:17:11 | |
| 72 | Christine Smith | Ireland | 1:17:13 | |
| 73 | Cathy Smith | Ireland | 1:17:32 | |
| 74 | Anette Nielsen | Denmark | 1:17:37 | |
| 75 | Marie-Christine Deurbroeck | Belgium | 1:18:21 | |
| 76 | Karen Gobby | Australia | 1:18:24 | |
| 77 | Mazal Shalom | Israel | 1:18:27 | |
| 78 | Fikirte Gebremichael | Ethiopia | 1:18:29 | |
| 79 | Debbie van Rensburg | South Africa | 1:19:33 | |
| 80 | Frances Murphy | Ireland | 1:20:42 | |
| 81 | Mary Brayley | Ireland | 1:21:08 | |
| 82 | Viviane Van Buggenhout | Belgium | 1:24:52 | |
| — | Kelly Lopes dos Santos/de Oliveira | Brazil | DNF | |
| — | Ann-Catrin Nordman | Finland | DNF | |

=== Junior men's ===
| Rank | Athlete | Nationality | Time | Notes |
|---|---|---|---|---|
| 1st place, gold medalist(s) | Kassa Tadesse | Ethiopia | 1:04:51 | |
| 2nd place, silver medalist(s) | Meck Mothuli | South Africa | 1:05:01 | |
| 3rd place, bronze medalist(s) | Francesco Ingargiola | Italy | 1:05:18 | |
| 4 | Salvatore Orgiana | Italy | 1:05:40 | |
| 5 | Zeryihun Bekele | Ethiopia | 1:06:26 | |
| 6 | Isaac Radebe | South Africa | 1:06:36 | |
| 7 | Ottaviano Andriani | Italy | 1:06:41 | |
| 8 | Matteo Palumbo | Italy | 1:07:12 | |
| 9 | Tesfaye Etecha | Ethiopia | 1:07:39 | |
| 10 | Henno Haava | Estonia | 1:07:44 | |
| 11 | Enoch Skosana | South Africa | 1:08:27 | |
| 12 | Marcel Matanin | Czechoslovakia | 1:09:04 | |
| 13 | Rain Miljan | Estonia | 1:09:11 | |
| 14 | Dirk Berger | Germany | 1:09:18 | |
| 15 | Péter Werner | Hungary | 1:09:48 | |
| 16 | Zsolt Füleki | Hungary | 1:10:09 | |
| 17 | Yared Kebede | Ethiopia | 1:10:15 | |
| 18 | Christoph Melcher | Germany | 1:10:41 | |
| 19 | Jesús Alvarado | Spain | 1:11:49 | |
| 20 | Jan Diekow | Germany | 1:13:11 | |
| 21 | Dirk Schinkoreit | Germany | 1:13:51 | |
| 22 | János Bohus | Hungary | 1:14:15 | |
| 23 | Tobias Lindenmayer | Germany | 1:14:15 | |
| — | Maurizio Gemetto | Italy | DNF | |

== Team Results ==
=== Men's ===
| Rank | Country | Team | Time |
|---|---|---|---|
| 1st place, gold medalist(s) | Kenya | Benson Masya; Lameck Aguta; Joseph Keino | 3:02:25 |
| 2nd place, silver medalist(s) | Great Britain | Dave Lewis; Paul Evans; Carl Thackery | 3:04:54 |
| 3rd place, bronze medalist(s) | Brazil | Artur Castro; Ronaldo da Costa; Delmir dos Santos | 3:05:56 |
| 4 | Spain | Alejandro Gómez; Antoni Peña; Alberto Juzdado | 3:06:16 |
| 5 | Italy | Francesco Panetta; Luca Barzaghi; Severino Bernardini | 3:06:29 |
| 6 | Japan | Koichi Fujita; Junji Haraguchi; Kenjiro Jitsui | 3:06:34 |
| 7 | South Africa | Xolile Yawa; Meshack Mogotsi; Hendrik Thukwane | 3:07:55 |
| 8 | France | Pascal Fetizon; Bertrand Itsweire; Didier Bernard | 3:08:00 |
| 9 | Netherlands | John Vermeule; Martin ten Kate; Gerard Kappert | 3:09:03 |
| 10 | Ethiopia | Melese Feissa; Wolde Silasse Melkessa; Kidane Gebrmichael | 3:10:26 |
| 11 | Algeria | Kamal Kohil; Sid-Ali Sakhri; Azzedine Sakhri | 3:10:27 |
| 12 | United States | Bill Reifsnyder; Chad Bennion; Benjamin McIntosh | 3:11:09 |
| 13 | Germany | Steffen Dittmann; Kurt Stenzel; Axel Krippschock | 3:12:43 |
| 14 | Slovenia | Mirko Vindiš; Igor Šalamun; Roman Kejžar | 3:13:26 |
| 15 | Norway | Bjørn Nordheggen; Frank Bjørkli; Terje Näss | 3:14:05 |
| 16 | Ireland | Noel Berkeley; Roy Dooney; Gerry Healy | 3:15:02 |
| 17 | Belgium | Ronny Ligneel; Herman Decoux; Marc Ruell | 3:18:27 |
| 18 | Mexico | Carlos Bautista; Rafael Zepeda; Salvador García | 3:21:02 |
| 19 | Botswana | Zachariah Ditetso; Kelekwang Sera; Kabo Gabaseme | 3:25:01 |

=== Women's ===
| Rank | Country | Team | Time |
|---|---|---|---|
| 1st place, gold medalist(s) | Japan | Megumi Fujiwara; Miyoko Asahina; Eriko Asai | 3:30:39 |
| 2nd place, silver medalist(s) | Great Britain | Liz McColgan; Andrea Wallace; Suzanne Rigg | 3:33:03 |
| 3rd place, bronze medalist(s) | Romania | Anuța Cătună; Iulia Negura; Aurica Buia | 3:33:27 |
| 4 | Italy | Rosanna Munerotto; Maria Guida; Emma Scaunich | 3:34:57 |
| 5 | United States | Gordon Bloch; Joy Smith; Diane Bussa | 3:35:32 |
| 6 | Commonwealth of Independent States | Nadezhda Ilyina; Galina Ikonnikova; Tatyana Titova | 3:36:13 |
| 7 | Germany | Birgit Jerschabek; Kerstin Pressler; Gabriela Wolf | 3:37:21 |
| 8 | Norway | Bente Moe; Hilde Stavik; Grete Kirkeberg | 3:38:19 |
| 9 | France | Annick Clouvel; Dominique Le Pechoux; Odile Ohier | 3:39:12 |
| 10 | Netherlands | Marjan Freriks; Carla Beurskens; Marianne van de Linde | 3:39:15 |
| 11 | South Africa | Colleen de Reuck; Nicole Whiteford; Grace de Oliveira | 3:39:46 |
| 12 | Spain | Rocío Ríos; Ana Isabel Alonso; Soledad Castro Soliño | 3:41:20 |
| 13 | Ethiopia | Fatuma Roba; Emebet Abossa; Gadissie Edato | 3:43:06 |
| 14 | Denmark | Susanne Nedergaard; Anita Palshøj; Anette Nielsen | 3:45:12 |
| 15 | Ireland | Ursula Noctor; Christine Smith; Cathy Smith | 3:48:42 |
| 16 | Belgium | Myriam Dumont; Marie-Christine Deurbroeck; Viviane Van Buggenhout | 4:00:24 |
| — | Brazil | Rizoneide Vanderley; Viviany de Oliveira; Kelly Lopes dos Santos/de Oliveira | DNF |
| — | Finland | Päivi Tikkanen; Ritva Lemettinen; Ann-Catrin Nordman | DNF |

=== Junior men's ===
| Rank | Country | Team | Time |
|---|---|---|---|
| 1st place, gold medalist(s) | Italy | Francesco Ingargiola; Salvatore Orgiana; Ottaviano Andriani | 3:17:39 |
| 2nd place, silver medalist(s) | Ethiopia | Kassa Tadesse; Zeryihun Bekele; Tesfaye Etecha | 3:18:56 |
| 3rd place, bronze medalist(s) | South Africa | Meck Mothuli; Isaac Radebe; Enoch Skosana | 3:20:04 |
| 4 | Germany | Dirk Berger; Christoph Melcher; Jan Diekow | 3:33:10 |
| 5 | Hungary | Péter Werner; Zsolt Füleki; János Bohus | 3:34:12 |

== Participation ==
The participation of 204 athletes (120 men/84 women) from 36 countries is reported.

- Algeria (5)
- Argentina (1)
- Australia (2)
- Belgium (6)
- Botswana (3)
- Brazil (7)
- Commonwealth of Independent States (4)
- Czechoslovakia (4)
- Denmark (5)
- Estonia (3)
- Ethiopia (13)
- Finland (3)
- France (10)
- Germany (13)
- Hungary (5)
- Iceland (1)
- Ireland (9)
- Israel (2)
- Italy (13)
- Ivory Coast (2)
- Japan (9)
- Kenya (5)
- Mexico (3)
- Netherlands (10)
- Norway (7)
- Poland (1)
- Puerto Rico (1)
- Romania (4)
- South Africa (13)
- Spain (11)
- Slovenia (4)
- Sweden (2)
- Switzerland (2)
- Tanzania (1)
- United Kingdom (10)
- United States (10)

== See also ==
- 1992 in athletics (track and field)
