= DVLF =

DVLF is the initialism for:

- Delaware Valley Legacy Fund
- Dictionnaire Vivant de la Langue Française
