= 1997 Boston Marathon =

Footrace in Boston, Massachusetts, USA

- Venue: Boston, United States
- Dates: April 21

Champions
- Men: Lameck Aguta (2:10:34)
- Women: Fatuma Roba (2:26:23)

The 1997 Boston Marathon was the 101st running of the annual marathon race in Boston, United States, which was held on April 21. The elite men's race was won by Kenya's Lameck Aguta in a time of 2:10:34 hours and the women's race was won by Ethiopia's Fatuma Roba in 2:26:23.

== Results ==
=== Men ===
Position	Athlete	Nationality	Time
1st place, gold medalist(s)	Lameck Aguta	Kenya	2:10:34
2nd place, silver medalist(s)	Joseph Kamau	Kenya	2:10:46
3rd place, bronze medalist(s)	Dionicio Cerón	Mexico	2:10:59
4	Germán Silva	Mexico	2:11:21
5	Moses Tanui	Kenya	2:11:38
6	Gilbert Rutto	Kenya	2:12:30
7	Jimmy Muindi	Kenya	2:12:49
8	André Luiz Ramos	Brazil	2:13:10
9	José Luis Molina	Costa Rica	2:13:24
10	Tesfaye Bekele	Ethiopia	2:14:02

=== Women ===
Position	Athlete	Nationality	Time
1st place, gold medalist(s)	Fatuma Roba	Ethiopia	2:26:23
2nd place, silver medalist(s)	Elana Meyer	South Africa	2:27:09
3rd place, bronze medalist(s)	Colleen De Reuck	South Africa	2:28:03
4	Uta Pippig	Germany	2:28:51
5	Derartu Tulu	Ethiopia	2:30:28
6	Junko Asari	Japan	2:31:12
7	Alla Zhilyaeva	Russia	2:31:55
8	Sonia Maccioni	Italy	2:31:59
9	Kim Jones	United States	2:32:52
10	Debbi Kilpatrick	United States	2:36:04
