= Gold Coast Marathon =

Annual race in Australia held since 1979

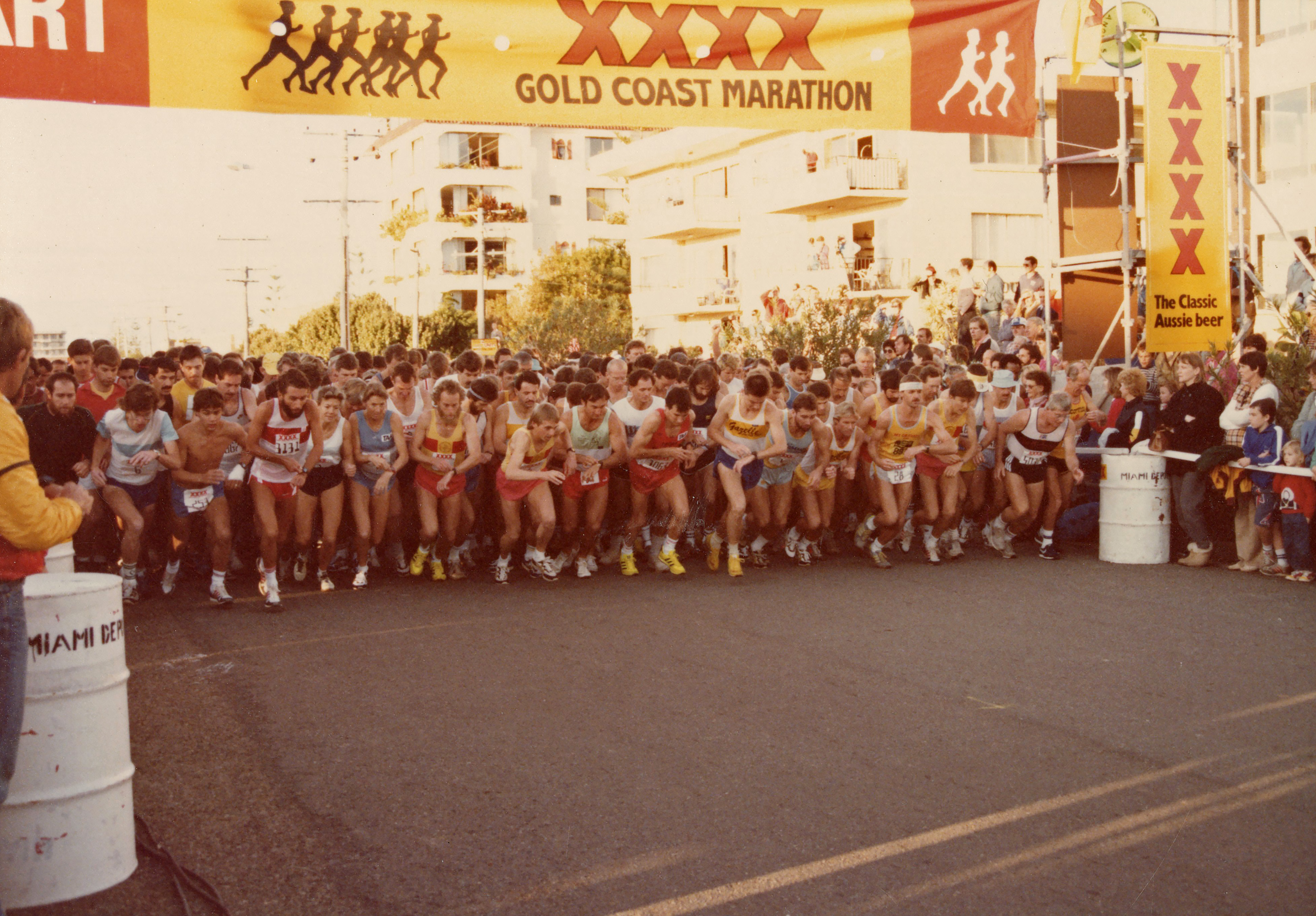
- Starting line of the 1986 race
- Date: July
- Location: Gold Coast, Queensland, Australia
- Event type: Road
- Distance: Marathon, half marathon
- Established: 1979 (47 years ago)
- Course records: Men's: 2:07:50 (2019) (Japan) Yuta Shitara; Women's: 2:24:22 (2024) (Japan) Yuki Nakamura
- Website: Official website
- Participants: 5,769 (2019)

The Gold Coast Marathon is an annual road marathon on the Gold Coast, Queensland, Australia, first held in 1979. Marketed as "Australia's premier road race", the marathon is one of two races in Australia to hold World Athletics Label status, the other being Sydney Marathon. The marathon is held on the first Sunday of July each year, with other races held the day before.

The men's course record of 2:07:40 was achieved by Naoki Koyama in 2023. Lindsay Flanagan is the women's course record holder with her run of 2:24:43 in 2022.

== History ==
The inaugural Gold Coast Marathon was held on 2 September 1979 in the suburb of Evandale as part of a health awareness campaign for the Gold Coast. It started and ended at the Evandale Civic Centre and consisted of six laps over Chevron Island Bridge, through Surfers Paradise and over the Isle of Capri Bridge. There were 124 competitors in the marathon, 144 competitors in the half marathon and 423 competitors in an additional fun run. The winning male and female were Eric Sigmont from Victoria and Mary Murison from Lismore.

The 2020 edition of the race was cancelled due to the coronavirus pandemic, with all registrants receiving refunds. (Note: Registrants who paid by credit card would receive refunds automatically (minus credit card fees), while other registrants would receive a full refund via direct deposit after supplying bank details.) Four days before the scheduled event, the 2021 edition of the race was cancelled due to a three-day snap lockdown in parts of Queensland, including the Gold Coast, that was announced earlier that day. (Note: The lockdown was announced in response to an unvaccinated hospital worker who had been travelling throughout Queensland while she was potentially infectious for over a week.) The lockdown would have ended hours before the start of the event, which would have made attempting to hold the event impractical.

== Winners ==
Key: Course record (in bold)

Ed.	Year	Men's winner	Time	Women's winner	Time	Rf.
1	1979	(Australia) Eric Sigmont	2:28:44	(New Zealand) Lindsey Simmons	2:50:17	
2	1980	(Australia) Andrew Lloyd	2:23:02	(Australia) Mary Murison	2:58:33	
3	1981	(Australia) Rod Lyons	2:24:04	(Australia) Margaret Reddan	2:58:33	
4	1982	(New Caledonia) Alain Lazare	2:19:21	(Australia) Jill Colwell	2:43:25	
5	1983	(Australia) Laurie Adams	2:16:22	(Australia) Rhonda Bushby	2:49:17	
6	1984	(Australia) Pat Carroll	2:23:16	(Australia) Margaret Reddan	2:57:13	
7	1985	(Australia) Pat Carroll	2:17:10	(Australia) Margaret Reddan	2:54:55	
8	1986	(Australia) Peter Mitchell	2:14:59	(Australia) Margaret Reddan	2:47:09	
9	1987	(Australia) Laurie Adams	2:18:24	(Australia) Janet McAfee	2:54:22	
10	1988	(Australia) Pat Carroll	2:10:44	(New Zealand) Ngaire Drake	2:39:25	
11	1989	(Australia) Brad Camp	2:10:11	(Australia) Jan Fedrick	2:51:30	
12	1990	(Australia) Allan Carman	2:15:15	(Japan) Hiromi Satoyama	2:40:57	
13	1991	(Japan) Shinji Kawashima	2:14:01	(Australia) Jackie Hallam	2:36:23	
14	1992	(Japan) Katsumi Kitajima	2:14:14	(Japan) Mari Tanigawa	2:35:45	
15	1993	(Australia) Sean Quilty	2:15:31	(Japan) Eriko Asai	2:29:29	
16	1994	(Japan) Hajime Nakatomi	2:15:05	(Japan) Yuko Yamazoe	2:43:20	
17	1995	(Australia) Roderic De Highden	2:13:59	(Australia) Julie Rose	2:38:42	
18	1996	(Australia) Magnus Michelsson	2:20:20	(Australia) Sylvia Rose	2:40:17	
19	1997	(Australia) Pat Carroll	2:11:21	(Australia) Susan Hobson	2:32:43	
20	1998	(Kenya) Fred Kiprop	2:11:15	(Estonia) Jane Salumäe	2:33:34	
21	1999	(Kenya) Fred Kiprop	2:14:02	(Japan) Hiromi Igarishi	2:35:19	
22	2000	(Kenya) Joseph Kahugu	2:16:39	(Australia) Samantha Hughes	2:44:04	
23	2001	(New Zealand) Phil Costley	2:13:36	(Japan) Yuko Arimori	2:35:40	
24	2002	(Australia) Rod de Highden	2:15:22	(Japan) Saori Kawai	2:37:48	
25	2003	(Tanzania) Dickson Marwa	2:12:53	(New Zealand) Shireen Crumpton	2:40:10	
26	2004	(Australia) Gemechu Woyecha	2:15:47	(Australia) Anna Thompson	2:40:53	
27	2005	(Tanzania) Dickson Marwa	2:16:10	(Australia) Jackie Fairweather	2:34:42	
28	2006	(Australia) Lee Troop	2:14:13	(Australia) Jennifer Gillard	2:41:06	
29	2007	(Japan) Toyokazu Yoshimura	2:20:07	(Japan) Ayumi Hayashi	2:33:22	
30	2008	(Japan) Kazuo Ietani	2:14:17	(New Zealand) Shireen Crumpton	2:38:16	
31	2009	(Kenya) William Chebor	2:11:58	(Australia) Lauren Shelley	2:42:22	
32	2010	(Kenya) James Mbugua	2:13:53	(Japan) Kaori Yoshida	2:31:33	
33	2011	(Kenya) Nicholas Kamakya	2:10:01	(Ethiopia) Goitetom Haftu	2:30:08	
34	2012	(Ethiopia) Alemayehu Shumye	2:10:35	(Japan) Kaori Yoshida	2:30:36	
35	2013	(Japan) Yuki Kawauchi	2:10:01	(Japan) Yukiko Akaba	2:27:17	
36	2014	(Kenya) Silah Limo	2:09:14	(Japan) Asami Kato	2:28:51	
37	2015	(Kenya) Kenneth Mungara	2:08:42	(Japan) Risa Takenaka	2:28:25	
38	2016	(Kenya) Kenneth Mungara	2:09:00	(Japan) Misato Horie	2:26:40	
39	2017	(Japan) Takuya Noguchi	2:08:59	(Ethiopia) Abebech Bekele	2:25:34	
40	2018	(Kenya) Kenneth Mungara	2:09:49	(Kenya) Ruth Chebitok	2:24:49	
41	2019	(Japan) Yuta Shitara	2:07:50	(Kenya) Rodah Tanui	2:27:56	
—	—	cancelled in 2020 and 2021 due to coronavirus pandemic				
42	2022	(Japan) Jo Fukuda	2:10:55	(United States) Lindsay Flanagan	2:24:43	
43	2023	(Japan) Naoki Koyama	2:07:40	(Kenya) Rodah Tanui	2:27:10	
44	2024	(Kenya) Timothy Kipkorir	2:08:52	(Japan) Yuki Nakamura	**2:24:22**	
45	2025	(Japan) Yuki Takei	2:07:33	(Ethiopia) Tegest Ayalew	2:29:27	
46	2026	(Australia) Haftu Strintzos	**2:06:20**	(Ethiopia) Almaz Kebebe	2:24:53	
