= C.C. Téllez =

Bolivian runner and LGBTQ rights advocate

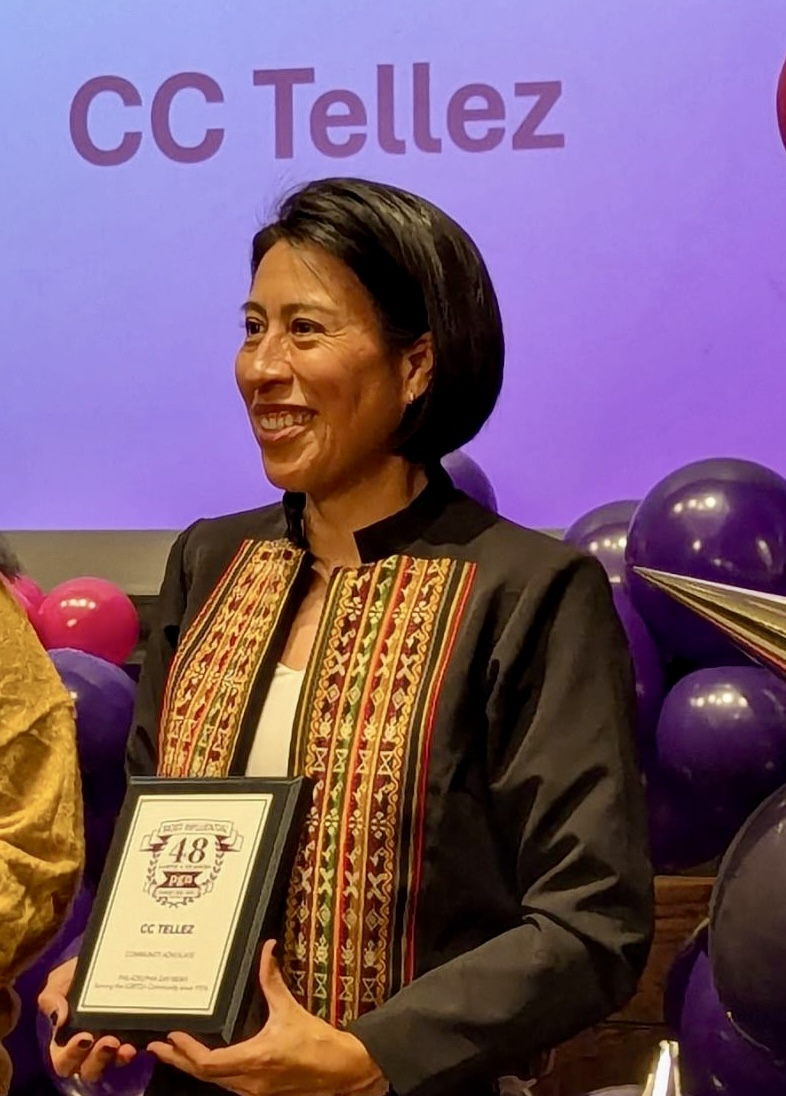
C.C. Tellez PGN 2024 Award

Cecilia (C.C.) Téllez is a Bolivian distance runner and advocate for LGBTQ civil rights. Téllez graduated from Wissahickon High School in Ambler, Pennsylvania, and earned a Bachelor of Arts in Business Administration from Bloomsburg University of Pennsylvania, where she was a member of the Bloomsburg University Women's Rugby Club (BUWRFC).

Téllez was named one of the 48 Most Influential LGBTQ+ Leaders for 2024 by the Philadelphia Gay News.

Téllez is a lesbian and hails from La Paz, Bolivia. She currently resides in Lafayette Hill, Pennsylvania.

== Advocacy and Leadership ==
Téllez has made significant contributions to both the LGBTQ+ community and the running world. She is the founder of the Lez Run Running Club. She serves as Co-Race Director and Co-Founder of the Philadelphia Pride Run. An ambassador for Athlete Ally, Téllez actively promotes inclusivity in sports. She previously served as Associate Director of LGBTQ Programming for Students Run Philly Style.

In 2024, she was appointed by the Montgomery County Commissioners to the inaugural Montgomery County Commission on LGBTQIA+ Affairs, a nonpartisan, non-political commission.

== Advocacy in Athletics ==
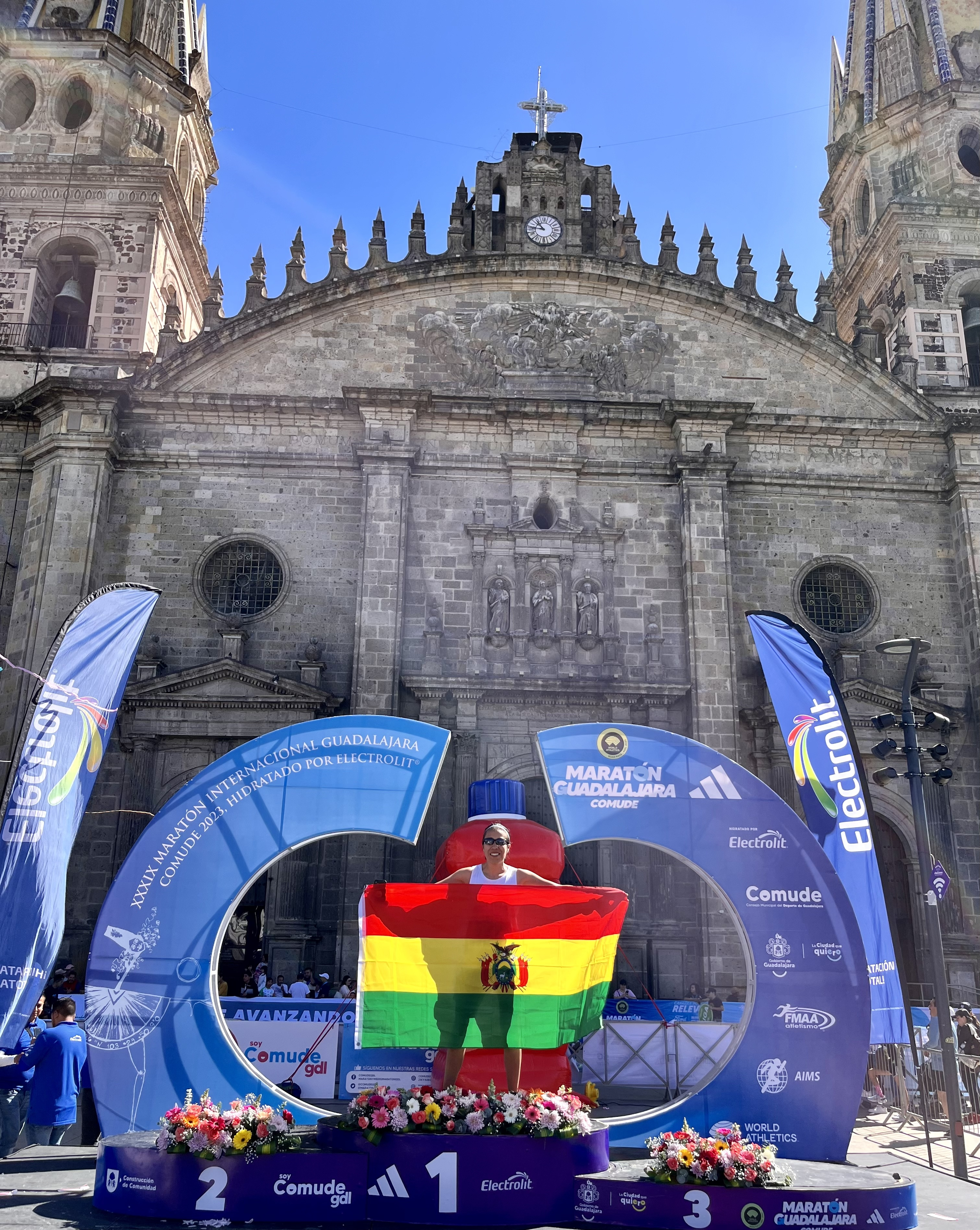
C.C. Tellez 2023 Mexico Gay Games Gold Medal

Téllez's advocacy has led to the adoption of nonbinary race inclusion and registration with equal prizes in events such as the Philadelphia Distance Run (PDR). After the groundbreaking PDR nonbinary race inclusion, the Blue Cross Broad Street Run, the Philadelphia Marathon, and all seven World Major Marathons, including Berlin, Boston, Chicago, London, New York, Tokyo and Sydney followed shortly afterward.

The Delaware Valley Legacy Fund (DVLF) honored Téllez with the Hero Award in recognition of her work in promoting LGBTQ+ inclusion. She joins a group of past DVLF Hero Award recipients, including The Philadelphia Foundation, GLSEN, Giovanni's Room, Barbara Gittings and Kay Lahusen, Gloria Casarez, U.S. Representatives Patrick Murphy and Mary Gay Scanlon, philanthropist Mel Heifetz, Olympian Johnny Weir, Admiral Dr. Rachel Levine, and Pennsylvania Governor Ed Rendell among others.

The DVLF praised Téllez's transformative efforts, stating:

"C.C. has been instrumental in promoting LGBTQ+ acceptance in running. Her efforts toward non-binary inclusion resulted in races adopting more inclusive policies, including the Philadelphia Distance Run, the first public race to offer non-binary race registrations with equal prizes. Since helping to generate this change, in 2022, the Blue Cross Broad Street Run and the Philadelphia Marathon, along with five of the six World Major Marathons—including Boston and Berlin—have adopted the policy."

== Athletic Achievements ==
- 2017 Women's Right to Run 19k: Téllez won first place at this race in Seneca Falls, New York, which celebrates the 19th Amendment mandating women's suffrage.
- 2022 Buffalo Marathon 5k: Téllez and Jenner Selig became the first women to secure the top two overall positions in this race.
- 2023 Gay Games XI in Guadalajara, Mexico: Representing Bolivia, Téllez won the gold medal in the women's marathon. This marked the first time the Gay Games were held in Latin America, an event recognized as the largest global sporting and cultural event for the LGBTQ+ community.
