= Cheromei =

Cheromei is a surname of Kenyan origin. Notable people with the surname include:

- Joseph Cheromei (born 1966), Kenyan former marathon runner and coach
- Lydia Cheromei (born 1977), Kenyan distance runner and world medallist, sister of Joseph
