= Orgiana =

Orgiana is an Italian surname. Notable people with the surname include:

- Benito Orgiana (1938–2021), Italian politician
- Salvatore Orgiana (born 1973), Italian long-distance runner

== See also ==
- Oriana
