= Philadelphia Distance Run =

Running event

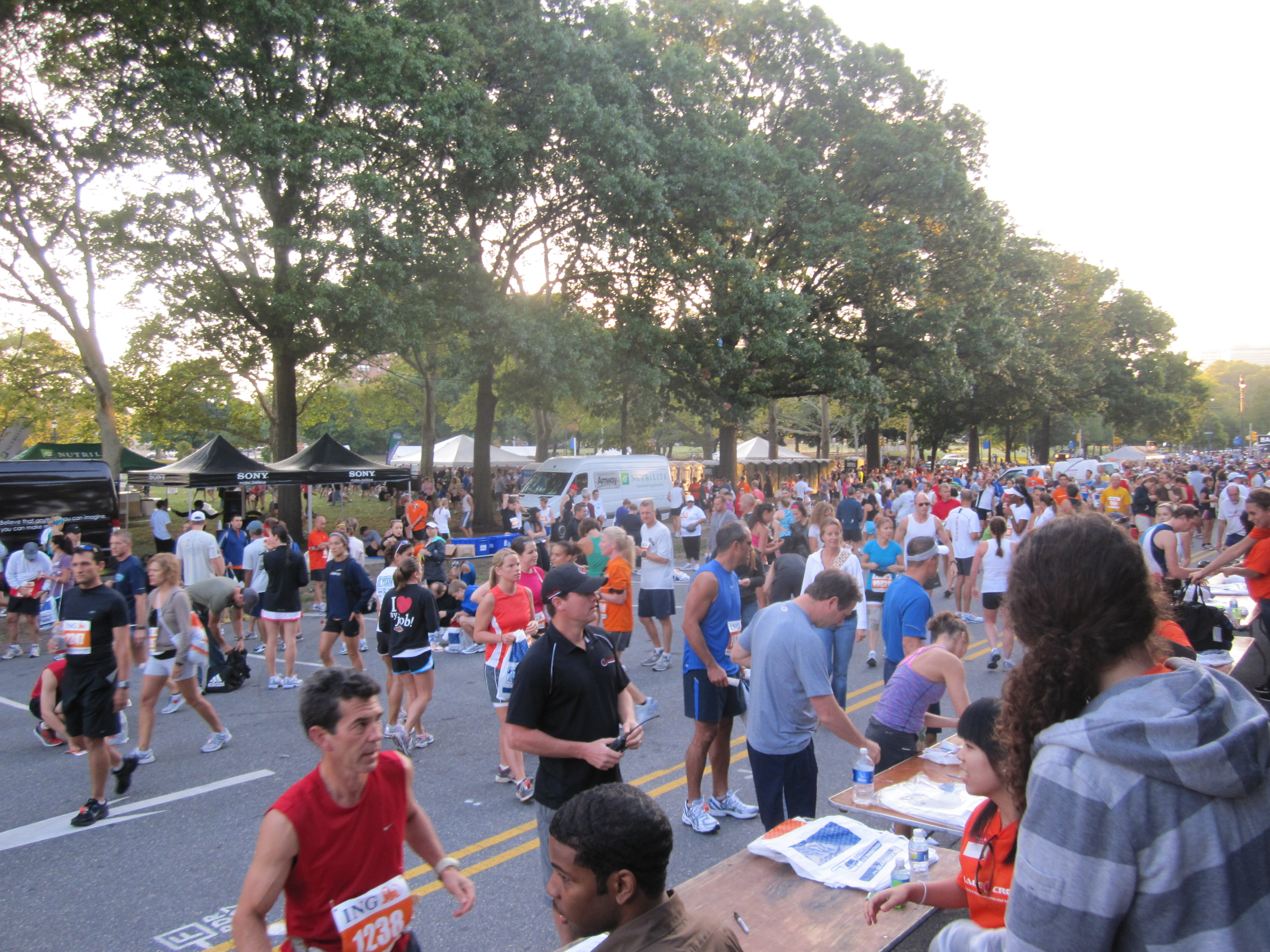
- Runners gathering at the 2010 race
- Date: September
- Location: Philadelphia, Pennsylvania; United States
- Event type: Road
- Distance: Half marathon
- Established: 1978
- Website: Philadelphia Distance Run

The Philadelphia Distance Run (PDR) is an annual half marathon road running event which takes place in Philadelphia, Pennsylvania in the United States on the third Sunday of September.

The competition was established in 1978 as the Philadelphia Distance Run and was founded by Gene H. Martenson, and was held under this name until 2009. From 2010 when Competitor Group Inc. bought the rights to the race, until 2020 it was part of the Rock 'n' Roll Marathon Series of running competitions. It has subsequently been presented by a consortium of local runners.

The race quickly became a top level race with international competition: four-time Olympic champion Lasse Virén of Finland won at the second edition and he was followed by further foreign Olympic medalists in New Zealand's Rod Dixon and Michael Musyoki of Kenya. Joan Samuelson took consecutive victories in the women's race in 1983 to 1985, which included world record times of 1:09:14 hours and 1:08:34 hours in 1983 and 1984. The latter mark stood as the American record for over twenty years and was broken by Deena Kastor at the 2005 edition of the Philadelphia Distance Run, with her winning time of 1:07:53 hours. The men's race has also seen historically fast times: Michael Musyoki's winning time of 1:01:36 hours in 1982 was a world record and in 1985 Mark Curp ran a world record time of 1:00:55 hours. On top of this, Dionicio Cerón's winning time of 1:00:46 hours in 1990 was recognised by the Association of Road Racing Statisticians as their world best mark, as per their stricter criteria.

The current course records were set in 2011 and both are the fastest times ever recorded for the half marathon on American soil: Mathew Kisorio ran the fourth fastest time ever (58:46 minutes) while Kim Smith's women's record of 1:07:11 hours made her the seventh fastest female ever in the half marathon.

The 2020 and 2021 editions of the race were cancelled due to the coronavirus pandemic.

In 2021 three running community leaders announced the return of the PDR with a focus on equity and inclusion. The three community leaders and new PDR race organizers were Ross Martinson, owner of Philadelphia Runner; Ryan Callahan, President of Runhouse and co-founder of the Philly 10K; and Andy Kucer, executive director of Students Run Philly Style.

Nonbinary Division

In 2021, the Philadelphia Distance Run made history as the first U.S. road race to establish a nonbinary gender division up to the elite level. Race organizer Andy Kucer said "we're looking at every angle of this race from an inclusivity standpoint, and making people feel included is so important to the character of the race." In 2021, Kucer and staff at Students Run Philly Style, including C.C. Téllez, associate director of LGBTQ Programming for Students Run Philly Style and founder of Lez Run, a Philadelphia running team aimed at providing LGBTQ athletes with safe and supportive running spaces looked at ways to make the PDR more inclusive. Téllez and Lez Run began working with local race directors to include the nonbinary division starting in 2018. “When we imagined an elite nonbinary division, we imagined it would be years and years in the future. We were struggling to just see this change at the local level,” Téllez told Runner’s World. Kucer and the race organizers announced that the 2021 Philadelphia Distance Run would become the first road race in the U.S. to establish a nonbinary division all the way up to the elite level, with equal prize money awarded to winners of the male, female, and nonbinary categories.

Following the 2021 Philadelphia Distance Run, major races across the U.S. and world modeled the PDR policy. In 2022, the Blue Cross Broad Street Run and the Philadelphia Marathon, plus five of the six World Major Marathons including the New York City Marathon, Boston Marathon, Chicago Marathon, London Marathon, Berlin Marathon, adopted the PDR's policy.

== Winners ==
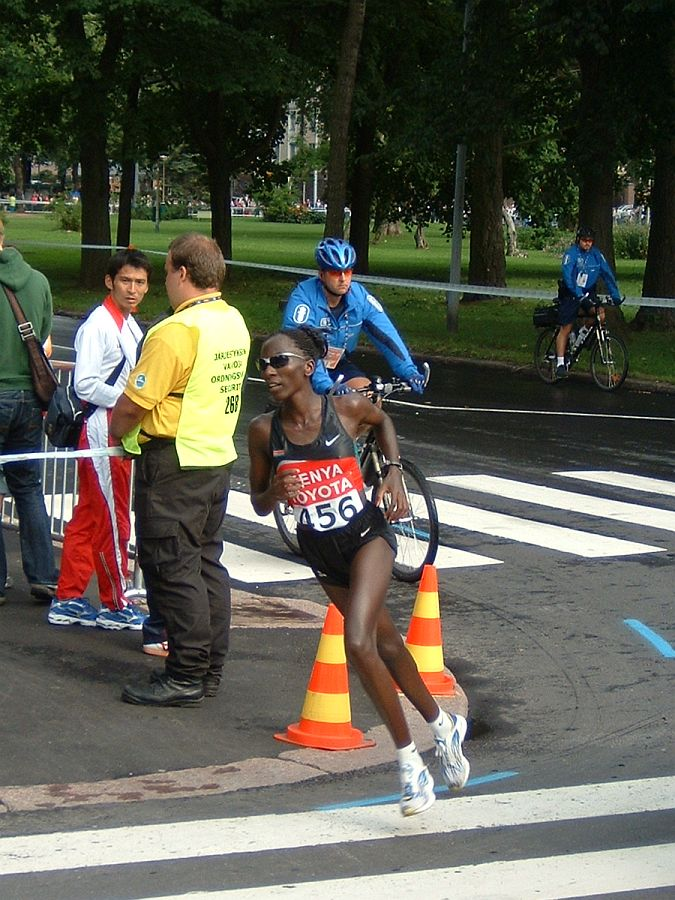
Catherine Ndereba of Kenya has won the women's race seven times, including five straight wins from 1998 to 2002.

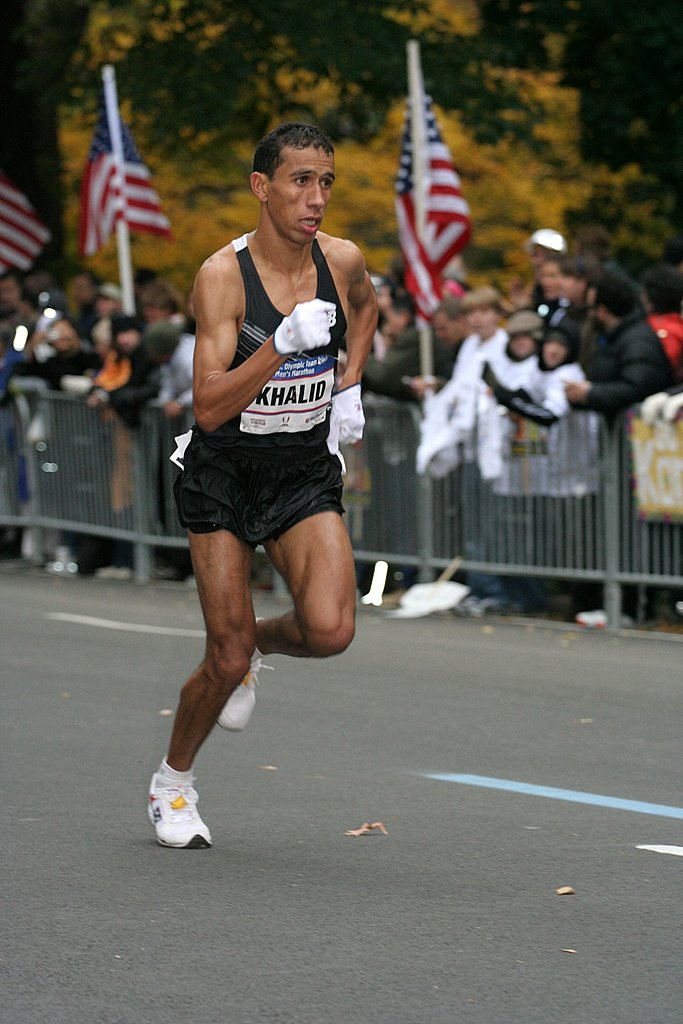
Multiple Chicago Marathon champion Khalid Khannouchi has won three times in Philadelphia.

Key: Course record

Ed.	Year	Men's winner	Time	Women's winner	Time
1st	1978	Julio Piazza (USA)	1:07:35	Nora Johnson (USA)	1:24:34
2nd	1979	Lasse Virén (FIN)	1:04:48	Lena Hollman (SWE)	1:20:06
3rd	1980	Rod Dixon (NZL)	1:03:39	Jan Yerkes (USA)	1:17:56
4th	1981	Rod Dixon (NZL)	1:02:12	Jan Yerkes (USA)	1:13:33
5th	1982	Michael Musyoki (KEN)	1:01:36	Judi St. Hilaire (USA)	1:13:13
6th	1983	Michael Musyoki (KEN)	1:02:49	Joan Samuelson (USA)	1:09:10
7th	1984	Dean Matthews (USA)	1:02:14	Joan Samuelson (USA)	1:08:34
8th	1985	Mark Curp (USA)	1:00:55	Joan Samuelson (USA)	1:09:44
9th	1986	Mark Curp (USA)	1:01:43	Midde Hamrin (SWE)	1:11:41
10th	1987	Martyn Brewer (USA)	1:02:07	Sylvia Mosqueda (USA)	1:10:47
11th	1988	Steve Jones (GBR)	1:02:17	Lesley Lehane (USA)	1:10:47
12th	1989	El Mostafa Nechchadi (MAR)	1:02:01	Nan Doak-Davis (USA)	1:11:24
13th	1990	Dionicio Cerón (MEX)	1:00:46	Cathy O'Brien (USA)	1:09:39
14th	1991	Rolando Vera (ECU)	1:03:00	Kim Jones (USA)	1:12:53
15th	1992	Noel Richardson (IRL)	1:03:13	Wilma van Onna (NED)	1:10:59
16th	1993	Luketz Swartbooi (NAM)	1:01:26	Colleen De Reuck (RSA)	1:10:26
17th	1994	William Kiptoo Koech (KEN)	1:02:04	Anne-Marie Lauck (USA)	1:10:03
18th	1995	Joseph Kamau (KEN)	1:01:30	Tatyana Pozdnyakova (UKR)	1:12:56
19th	1996	Joseph Kamau (KEN)	1:01:02	Catherine Ndereba (KEN)	1:10:40
20th	1997	Khalid Khannouchi (MAR)	1:00:27	Colleen De Reuck (RSA)	1:10:06
21st	1998	Peter Githuka Mwangi (KEN)	1:01:58	Catherine Ndereba (KEN)	1:09:46
22nd	1999	Khalid Khannouchi (MAR)	1:00:47	Catherine Ndereba (KEN)	1:10:31
23rd	2000	Khalid Khannouchi (USA)	1:01:17	Catherine Ndereba (KEN)	1:10:01
24th	2001	Ronald Mogaka (KEN)	1:01:25	Catherine Ndereba (KEN)	1:08:30
25th	2002	Ronald Mogaka Boraya (KEN)	1:02:22	Catherine Ndereba (KEN)	1:09:20
26th	2003	Laban Kipkemboi (KEN)	1:01:29	Leah Malot (KEN)	1:11:20
27th	2004	Julius Kibet Koskei (KEN)	1:01:17.1	Nuța Olaru (ROM)	1:09:38
28th	2005	Gudisa Shentama (ETH)	1:02:23	Deena Kastor (USA)	1:07:53
29th	2006	Wilson Kebenei (KEN)	1:01:05	Lineth Chepkurui (KEN)	1:10:09
30th	2007	Julius Kibet Kosgei (KEN)	1:02:02	Pamela Chepchumba (KEN)	1:08:45
31st	2008	Yerefu Berhanu (ETH)	1:01:22	Liliya Shobukhova (RUS)	1:10:21
32nd	2009	Ryan Hall (USA)	1:01:52	Catherine Ndereba (KEN)	1:09:43
33rd	2010	Mathew Kisorio (KEN)	1:00:16	Meseret Defar (ETH)	1:07:45
34th	2011	Mathew Kisorio (KEN)	58:46	Kim Smith (NZL)	1:07:11
35th	2012	Stanley Biwott (KEN)	1:00:03	Sharon Cherop (KEN)	1:07:21
36th	2013	Stanley Biwott (KEN)	59:36	Lyudmyla Kovalenko (UKR)	1:08:59
37th	2014	Bitan Karoki (KEN)	59:23	Aberu Kebede (ETH)	1:08:41
38th	2015	Tim Ritchie (USA)	1:01:23	Maegan Krifchin (USA)	1:09:51
39th	2016	Augustine Choge (KEN)	1:03:24	Buze Diriba (ETH)	1:11:49
40th	2017	Galen Rupp (USA)	1:02:18	Meseret Defar (ETH)	1:08:45
41st	2018	Shura Kitana (ETH)	59:16	Desiree Linden (USA)	1:11:48
42nd	2019	Daniel Mesfun (ERI)	1:02:58	Caroline Rotich (KEN)	1:10:59
	2020	cancelled due to coronavirus pandemic			
43rd	2021	Tsegay Tuemay (ERI)	1:02:44	Atsede Tesema (ETH)	1:10:42
44th	2022	James Ngandu (KEN)	1:02:01	Monicah Ngige (KEN)	1:09:23
