= Pat Carroll (runner) =

Personal information
- Born: Patrick Francis Carroll; 17 August 1961 (age 64)

Sport
- Country: Australia
- Sport: Athletics
- Event: Marathon
Medal record
World Half Marathon Championships
| Silver medal – second place | 1993 Brussels | Men's team |

Patrick Francis Carroll OAM (born 17 August 1961) is an Australian former long-distance runner.

Carroll retired from competitive running and currently coaches runners online as well as at his running group PCRG. Carroll MC's events and is a Gold Coast Marathon Ambassador.

A Brisbane-based runner, Carroll claimed a silver medal at the 1993 World Half Marathon Championships for the team competition.

In 1995, Carroll ran a personal best time of 2:09:39 to win the Beppu-Ōita Marathon, becoming the fourth Australian to register a sub 2:10 time. He beat a field which included reigning Olympic bronze medalist Stephan Freigang.

Carroll competed in three editions of the Commonwealth Games, placing eighth in the 5,000 metres in 1990, fifth in the marathon in 1994 and seventh in the marathon in 1998.

Carroll won the Australian cross country championships in 1991, was a four-time winner of the Gold Coast Marathon and twice won the Sydney Morning Herald Half Marathon.

Jan 2024. Awarded “Medal of the order of Australia” (OAM) for services to community health and athletics.

11th fastest in the World for the Marathon throughout 1995 (2.09.39)

6 fastest in the World for the Half Marathon throughout 1994 (61:11)

1st place – 1995 Beppu Marathon (2:09:39)

4 time winner of the Gold Coast Marathon 83/84/88/97, where there was 14 years separating first and fourth win

2 time winner (94/96) Sydney Morning Herald Half Marathon

current holder of the Australian all comers record for the Half Marathon: 61min 11sec

member of Silver Medal Australian Team @ 1993 World Half Marathon Championship

2000: Awarded Australian Sports Medal

He is one of Australia’s most versatile distance runners, with personal bests of 3:39.03 in the 1500 metres (3.56 miles) and 2:09:39 in the marathon.

represented Australia 18 times

finished in the top 8 at three Commonwealth Games

1988/1999 Australian Marathon Champion

1991 Australian Cross Country Champion

twice runner up in Sydney’s City to Surf

Qld record holder: Marathon 1988 – 2024 (36 years)

Qld record hold: Half Marathon 1987 – 2022 (35 years)

7th fastest Australian Marathoner “all-time”

8th fastest Australian Half Marathoner “all-time”
