= 1996 New York City Marathon =

Footrace held in New York City

27th New York City Marathon
- Venue: New York City, New York
- Date: November 3

Champions
- Men: Giacomo Leone (2:09:54)
- Women: Anuța Cătună (2:28:18)

The 1996 New York City Marathon was the 27th running of the annual marathon race in New York City, New York, which took place on Sunday, November 3. The men's elite race was won by Italy's Giacomo Leone in a time of 2:09:54 hours while the women's race was won by Romania's Anuța Cătună in 2:28:18.

A total of 28,182 runners finished the race, 20,749 men and 7433 women.

== Results ==
=== Men ===
Position	Athlete	Nationality	Time
1st place, gold medalist(s)	Giacomo Leone	Italy	2:09:54
2nd place, silver medalist(s)	Tumo Turbo	Ethiopia	2:10:09
3rd place, bronze medalist(s)	Joseph Kamau	Kenya	2:10:40
4	John Kagwe	Kenya	2:10:59
5	Andrés Espinosa	Mexico	2:11:39
6	Cosmas Ndeti	Kenya	2:11:53
7	Martín Fiz	Spain	2:12:31
8	Luca Barzaghi	Italy	2:12:42
9	Sam Nyangincha	Kenya	2:12:44
10	William Koech	Kenya	2:12:57
11	Philip Chirchir	Kenya	2:15:29
12	Ezequiel Bitok	Kenya	2:15:57
13	Pablo Sierra	Spain	2:16:14
14	Marcello Curioni	Italy	2:16:19
15	Benson Masya	Kenya	2:16:36
16	Dominique Chauvelier	France	2:17:26
17	Terje Ness	Norway	2:17:47
18	Mirosław Żerkowski	Poland	2:18:24
19	Elijah Lagat	Kenya	2:18:35
20	Klaus-Peter Hansen	Denmark	2:18:41
—	Lazarus Nyakeraka	Kenya	DNF
—	Stefano Baldini	Italy	DNF
—	Massimiliano Ingrami	Italy	DNF
—	Moses Tanui	Kenya	DNF

=== Women ===
Position	Athlete	Nationality	Time
1st place, gold medalist(s)	Anuța Cătună	Romania	2:28:18
2nd place, silver medalist(s)	Franca Fiacconi	Italy	2:28:42
3rd place, bronze medalist(s)	Joyce Chepchumba	Kenya	2:29:38
4	Kim Jones	United States	2:34:46
5	Christine Mallo	France	2:35:31
6	Zahia Dahmani	France	2:36:40
7	Tegla Loroupe	Kenya	2:37:19
8	Grete Kirkeberg	Norway	2:37:37
9	Jeanne Peterson	United States	2:38:05
10	Gadisse Edato	Ethiopia	2:40:44
11	Josette Colomb	France	2:41:06
12	Zofia Wieciorkowska	Poland	2:42:46
13	Nelly Glauser	Switzerland	2:43:25
14	Gillian Horovitz	United Kingdom	2:45:12
15	Karen Peterson	United States	2:45:28
16	Maria-Claudia Menconi	Italy	2:46:01
17	Annie Coathalem	France	2:46:05
18	Jean Chodnicki	United States	2:49:33
19	Maria Gomes	Brazil	2:54:47
20	Makiko Somiya	Japan	2:55:37
