= Francesco Ingargiola =

Italian long-distance runner

Gianni Iapichino
Personal information
- Nationality: Italian
- Born: 15 February 1973 (age 53) Mazara del Vallo, Italy
- Height: 1.72 m (5 ft 7 1/2 in)
- Weight: 60 kg (132 lb)

Sport
- Country: Italy
- Sport: Athletics
- Event: Marathon
- Club: Polisportiva Atletica Mazara

Achievements and titles
- Personal best: Marathon: 2:08:49 (2000)
Medal record
World Half Marathon Championships
Bronze medal – third place	1992 Tyneside	Junior Race
World Military Championships
Gold medal – first place	1995 Rome	Marathon
Gold medal – first place	2003 Catania	Marathon
European Marathon Cup
Gold medal – first place	2006 Gothenburg	Team marathon

Francesco Ingargiola (born 15 February 1973 in Mazara del Vallo) is an Italian long-distance runner, who finished 5th in the men's marathon at the 2006 European Athletics Championships in Gothenburg.

== Biography ==
Ingargiola won two gold medals at the World Military Track & Field Championship (1995 and 2003).

== Achievements ==
Year	Competition	Venue	Position	Event	Notes
1997	World Championships	Athens, Greece	30th	Marathon	2:23:30
2000	Rome City Marathon	Rome, Italy	3rd	Marathon	2:08:49
2006	European Championships	Gothenburg, Sweden	5th	Marathon	2:13:04

== National titles ==
Ingargiola has won one time the individual national championship.

- 1 win in Marathon (1997)

== See also ==
- Italian all-time lists - half marathon
- Italian all-time lists - Marathon
