= Fred Kiprop =

Kenyan marathon runner

Fred Kiprop Kiptum (born June 3, 1974) is a male long-distance runner from Kenya, who won the Amsterdam Marathon in 1999 in a time of 2:06:47.

== Achievements ==
Year	Competition	Venue	Position	Event	Notes
Representing Kenya
1997	Bordeaux Marathon	Bordeaux, France	2nd	Marathon	2:12:44
1997	Chicago Marathon	Chicago, United States	2nd	Marathon	2:08:19
1998	Gold Coast Marathon	Brisbane, Australia	1st	Marathon	2:11:15
1998	New York City Marathon	New York City, United States	13th	Marathon	2:13:32
1999	Paris Marathon	Paris, France	4th	Marathon	2:08:44
1999	Gold Coast Marathon	Brisbane, Australia	1st	Marathon	2:14:02
1999	Amsterdam Marathon	Amsterdam, Netherlands	1st	Marathon	2:06:47
2000	Seoul International Marathon	Seoul, South Korea	4th	Marathon	2:12:45
2000	Chicago Marathon	Chicago, United States	5th	Marathon	2:08:23
2001	Paris Marathon	Paris, France	3rd	Marathon	2:09:43
2001	Madrid Millenium Marathon	Madrid, Spain	3rd	Marathon	2:11:24
2002	Lake Biwa Marathon	Ōtsu, Japan	3rd	Marathon	2:09:08
2002	Boston Marathon	Boston, United States	3rd	Marathon	2:09:45
2002	JoongAng Seoul Marathon	Seoul, South Korea	2nd	Marathon	2:09:47
2003	Rotterdam Marathon	Rotterdam, Netherlands	4th	Marathon	2:09:14
2003	JoongAng Seoul Marathon	Seoul, South Korea	4th	Marathon	2:12:27
2004	Hamburg Marathon	Hamburg, Germany	3rd	Marathon	2:11:46
2004	Berlin Marathon	Berlin, Germany	13th	Marathon	2:12:42
2006	Hamburg Marathon	Hamburg, Germany	5th	Marathon	2:11:04
2006	Amsterdam Marathon	Amsterdam, Netherlands	8th	Marathon	2:12:34
2009	Incheon Bridge Opening Commemorative International Marathon	Incheon, South Korea	4th	Marathon	2:17:15
