= Mari Tanigawa =

Japanese marathon runner

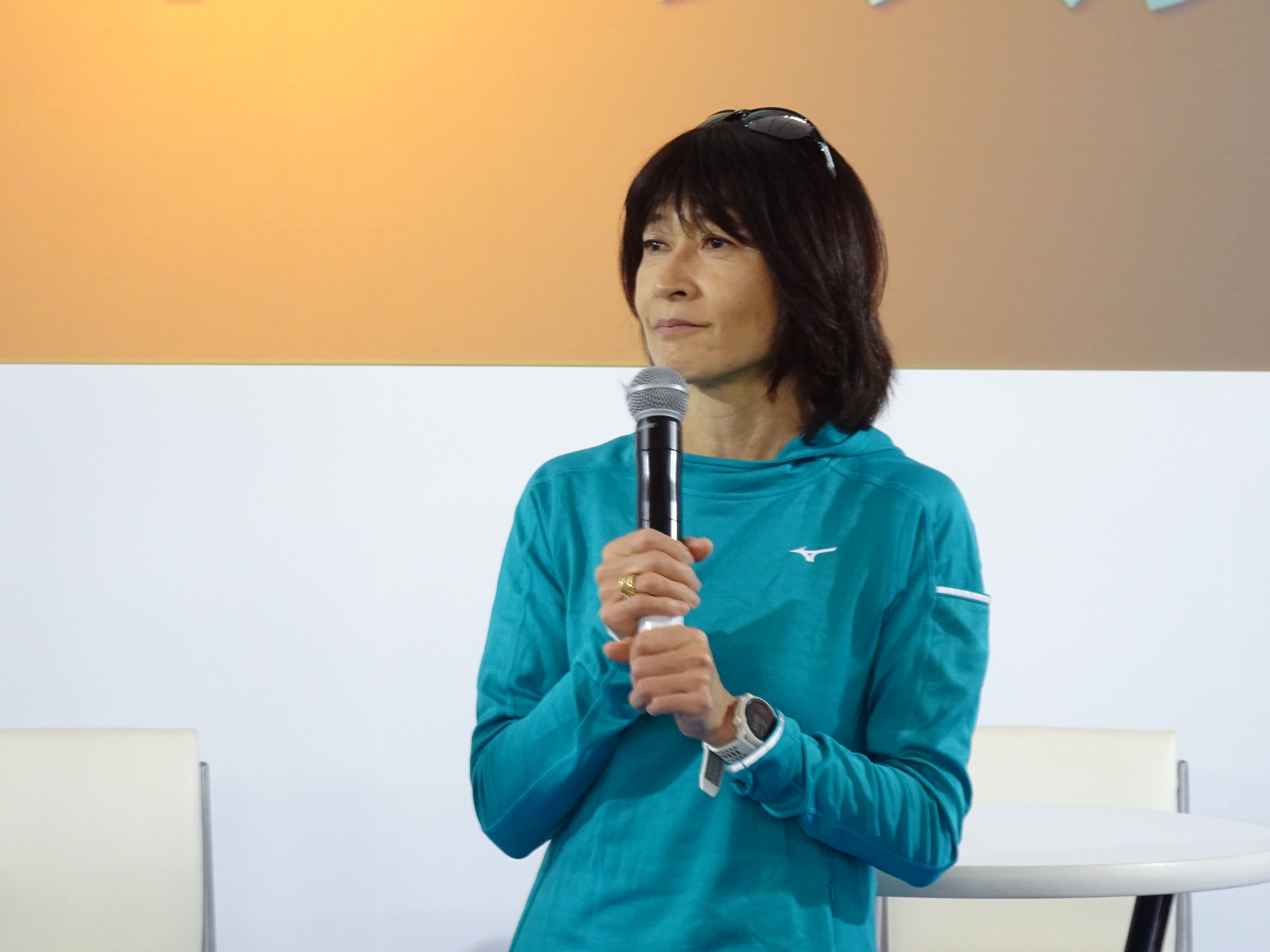
- at a talk show at "Furusato Matsuri Tokyo Dome 2023"

Personal information
- Born: 27 October 1962 (age 63)

Sport
- Country: Japan

Mari Tanigawa (谷川真理, Tanigawa Mari; born 27 October 1962) is a Japanese former marathon runner. Born in Fukuoka Prefecture, she was a two-time winner at the Tokyo International Women's Marathon, winner of the Australia's Gold Coast Marathon in 1992 and won the Paris Marathon in 1994.

Tanigawa also competed in half marathon races: she won individual and team silver medals at the 1993 IAAF World Half Marathon Championships and won the 1994 Sapporo Half Marathon and 1996 America's Finest City Half Marathon. She was a team bronze medalist at the 1994 IAAF World Half Marathon Championships, where she finished tenth.

She had career personal bests of 2:27:55 hours for the marathon and 1:09:37 hours for the half marathon.

She is the organizer of several popular races in Japan, the Mari Tanigawa Half Marathon and the Mari Tanigawa Ekiden.

== Achievements ==
- All results regarding marathon, unless stated otherwise

Year	Competition	Venue	Position	Event	Notes
Representing Japan
1990	Tokyo International Women's Marathon	Tokyo, Japan	3rd	Marathon	2:34:10
1991	Tokyo International Women's Marathon	Tokyo, Japan	1st	Marathon	2:31:27
1992	Nagoya International Women's Marathon	Nagoya, Japan	3rd	Marathon	2:31:09
1992	Gold Coast Marathon	Gold Coast, Australia	1st	Marathon	2:34:45
1993	Tokyo International Women's Marathon	Tokyo, Japan	2nd	Marathon	2:28:22
1994	Paris Marathon	Paris, France	1st	Marathon	2:27:55
1996	Honolulu Marathon	Honolulu, Hawaii	3rd	Marathon	2:36:20
1998	Maui Marathon	Maui, Hawaii	1st	Marathon	2:40:37
2003	Tokyo International Women's Marathon	Oki, Japan	3rd	Marathon	3:06:54
2005	Tokyo International Women's Marathon	Tokyo, Japan	1st	Marathon	2:40:46
2007	Tokyo Marathon	Tokyo, Japan	2nd	Marathon	2:49:55
