= Graziano Calvaresi =

Italian long-distance runner

Personal information
- Nationality: Italian
- Born: 18 October 1966 (age 59) Rimini

Sport
- Country: Italy
- Sport: Athletics
- Event: Long-distance running

Achievements and titles
- Personal best: Half marathon: 1:01:08 (1997)

Graziano Calvaresi (born 18 October 1966) is a former Italian male long-distance runner who competed at the 1993 IAAF World Half Marathon Championships at senior level.

== Achievements ==
Year	Competition	Venue	Rank	Event	Time	Notes
1993	Half Marathon Championships	(Belgium) Brussels	17th	Half marathon	1:02:19	
1994	European Championships	(Finland) Helsinki	DNF	Marathon	No time	

== National titles ==
- Italian Athletics Championships
  - 10,000 metres: 1990

== See also ==
- Italian all-time lists - half marathon
