= Naoki Koyama =

Japanese marathon runner (born 1996)

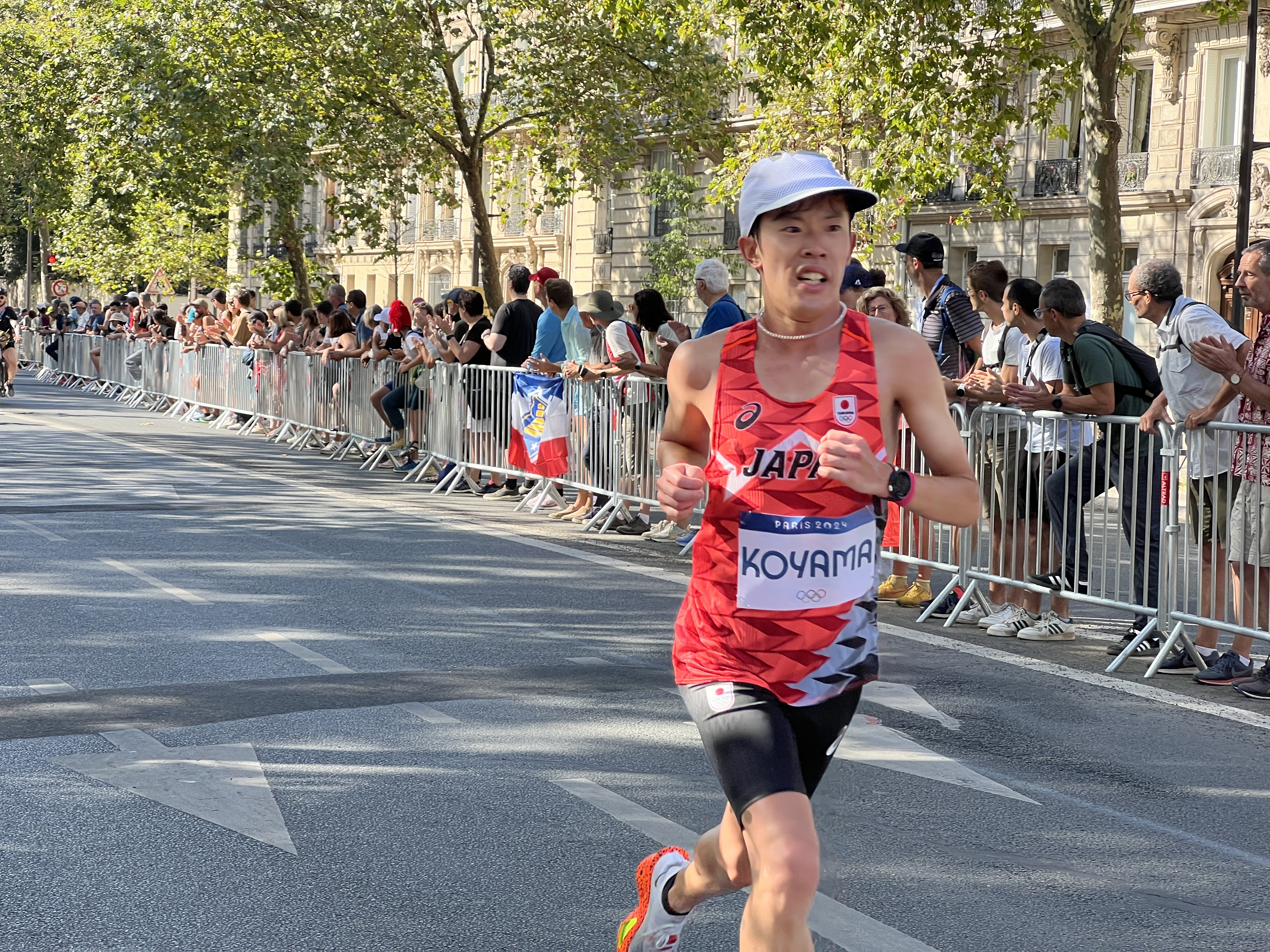
- Koyama at the 2024 Summer Olympics

Personal information
- Born: 12 May 1996 (age 29) Saitama, Japan
- Height: 1.70 m (5 ft 7 in)

Naoki Koyama (born 12 May 1996) is a Japanese marathon runner. Koyoma set a course record of 2:07:40 at the 2023 Gold Coast Marathon in Australia and qualified for the 2024 Summer Olympics by winning the Marathon Grand Championships in Japan. At the Olympics, Koyama placed 23rd in the men's marathon. He was present at the opening of the Museum of World Athletics Heritage Athletics exhibition at the Tokyo Metropolitan Government Building in July 2025.

== Personal bests ==
- 5000 metres – 13:38.81 (Chitose 2020)
- 10,000 metres – 27:55.16 (Fukagawa 2021)
- Half marathon – 1:01:08 (Yamaguchi 2020)
- Marathon – 2:06:33 (Osaka 2024)
