= Joseph Cheromei =

Kenyan long-distance runner and athletics coach

Medal record

Men's athletics

Representing Kenya

IAAF World Half Marathon Championships
Gold medal – first place	1993 Brussels	Team

Joseph Cheromei Kiprotich (born 24 January 1966) is a Kenyan former long-distance runner and athletics coach. He was a team gold medallist at the 1993 IAAF World Half Marathon Championships with Lameck Aguta and Thomas Osano, having finished sixteenth individually. His personal best for the marathon was 2:11:44 hours, achieved at the 1997 Prague International Marathon.

He regularly ran on the European professional road running circuit from 1992 to 2003 and won the Giro di Castelbuono (1993), Livorno Marathon (1998) and Quattro Porte Half Marathon (1998). During the course of his career, he completed no less than 43 marathons. In addition to Livorno, he won marathons in Italy in Pompei and Parabita, as well as the Florianópolis marathon in Brazil. At higher level races, he was runner-up at the Italian Marathon in 1997 and the 20 km of Brussels in 1995, and was fourth at the 1995 Florence Marathon.

After retiring, he went into coaching and among others coached his sister Lydia Cheromei.

== International competitions ==
Year	Competition	Venue	Position	Event	Notes
1993	World Half Marathon Championships	Brussels, Belgium	16th	Half marathon	1:02:15
1993	World Half Marathon Championships	Brussels, Belgium	1st	Team	3:05:40
