= Dictionnaire Vivant de la Langue Française =

French Dictionary (ARTFL Project)

The Dictionnaire Vivant de la Langue Française (French pronunciation: [diksjɔnɛːʁ vivɑ̃ d(ə) la lɑ̃ɡ fʁɑ̃sɛːz]; DVLF) is a French language dictionary developed by a team at the University of Chicago's ARTFL Project through the support of a Digital Humanities Start-Up Grant from the National Endowment for the Humanities. It is an experimental approach to dictionary compilation that offers an interactive and community-oriented alternative to traditional methods of French lexicography.

It was released in beta form in January 2011. Version 2.0 was released in 2017.
