= Luigi Di Lello =

Italian long-distance runner

Personal information
- Nationality: Italian
- Born: 31 May 1968 (age 58)

Sport
- Country: Italy
- Sport: Athletics
- Event: Marathon

Achievements and titles
- Personal best: Marathon: 2:11:36 (1995)

Luigi Di Lello (born 31 May 1968) is an Italian male retired marathon runner, which participated at the 1995 World Championships in Athletics in Gothenburg, Sweden.

== Achievements ==
Year	Competition	Venue	Position	Event	Performance	Notes
1995	World Championships	(Sweden) Gothenburg	DNF	Marathon	2:23:51	
