= Eriko Asai =

Japanese long-distance runner

Eriko Asai (浅井 えり子, Asai Eriko; born October 20, 1959) is a retired long-distance runner from Japan. She represented her native country in the women's marathon at the 1988 Summer Olympics in Seoul, South Korea. She won a gold medal at the 1986 Asian Games in Seoul, South Korea, and won the 1994 edition of the Nagoya Women's Marathon. She competed at a weight of 40 kilograms and a height of 150 centimeters.

== Achievements ==
Year	Competition	Venue	Position	Event	Notes
Representing Japan
1986	Asian Games	Seoul, South Korea	1st	Marathon	2:41:03
1987	World Championships	Rome, Italy	26th	Marathon	2:48:44
1988	Olympic Games	Seoul, South Korea	25th	Marathon	2:34:41
1992	World Half Marathon Championships	Newcastle, United Kingdom	7th	Half marathon	1:10:51
1994	Nagoya Women's Marathon	Nagoya, Japan	1st	Marathon	2:30:30
