= Delaware Valley Legacy Fund =

American LGBT organization

Delaware Valley Legacy Fund logo

The Delaware Valley Legacy Fund (DVLF) is a community foundation whose mission is to support the needs of the lesbian, gay, bisexual, and transgender (LGBT) and straight-allied communities in Eastern Pennsylvania, Delaware, and New Jersey. It is engaged in building a permanent endowment and philanthropic apparatus to serve the fundraising and grant making. DVLF was founded in 1993 and is based in Center City Philadelphia.

== History ==
DVLF was created in 1993, when community activists and donors decided that there was a need, given the growth of the LGBT movement, for a permanent reservoir of funds to support organizations in Greater Philadelphia. Many of these leaders had lived through the McCarthy Era, the Civil Rights Movement, and the beginning of the HIV/AIDS era, and desired the stability that could be provided by a permanent funding source. Legendary lesbian activist Barbara Gittings, whose activism began forty years earlier in the 1950s, served as a founding board member that also included Larry Biddle and Dennis Green.

In 2008, DVLF grants will total over $55,000, up from $18,800 in 2007.

The current president is D. Mark Mitchell and the current executive director is Samantha M. Giusti.

It has a 12-member Board of Directors and an Advisory Council of about 25 members.

== Fundraising ==
DVLF devotes significant resources to raising funds for programs and growing the endowment. It cultivates a broad donor base of individuals, couples, and businesses interested in supporting regional LGBT communities.

== Grant making ==
DVLF is also a grantmaking organization. In 2008, DVLF grants exceeded $50,000. Organizations that have received funding that year included:

- ActionAIDS
- AIDS Delaware – “You’re Not Alone” Youth Program
- AIDS Services in Asian Communities*
- Astraea Lesbian Foundation for Justice
- Attic Youth Center*
- Beta Phi Omega Sorority
- Bethel Community Center*
- Bucks Co. Council on Alcohol & Drug Dependence
- CAMP Rehoboth
- Delaware Valley Grantmakers
- Diakon Family Services
- Dignity Philadelphia
- Equality Action Pennsylvania*
- Equality Advocates Pennsylvania*
- Equality Forum
- Free Library of Philadelphia Foundation, Barbara Gittings Collection*
- Foyer of Philadelphia*
- Funders for Lesbian & Gay Issues
- House of Manolo Blahnik
- Human Rights Campaign – Philadelphia
- Human Rights Campaign Foundation
- Independence Business Alliance
- Lambda Legal Defense & Education Fund
- Martin Luther King High School Rainbow Room
- Men of All Colors Together – Philadelphia
- Mountain Meadow*
- Mural Arts Program
- National AIDS Fund
- National Black Justice Coalition
- New Hope Celebrates
- NLGJA Scholarship — Indiana University
- Philadelphia Falcons Soccer Club
- Philadelphia Gay Tourism Caucu
- Philly Pride Presents, Inc.
- Philadelphia Theatre Workshop
- Philadelphia Voices of Pride
- Philly Black Gay Pride COLOURS
- Rainbow Room — Planned Parenthood of Bucks County
- Queer Philadelphia Asians*
- Sean Halpin Memorial Scholarship at The Philadelphia Foundation
- SeniorLAW Center
- Smoke, Lilies, and Jade Project
- University of the Arts — Justin Eng Scholarship Award
- The William Way Community Center

(Asterisks indicate organizations for which DVLF provided the founding grant or grants.)
