= Salvatore Orgiana =

Italian long-distance runner

Personal information
- National team: Italy (5 caps from 1993 to 1995)
- Born: 12 October 1973 (age 52) Orroli, Italy

Sport
- Country: Italy
- Sport: Athletics
- Event: Long-distance running

Achievements and titles
- Personal bests: 10,000 Metres: 31:25.54 (10/08/1991); 10 Miles Road: 51:07 (11/09/1994); Half marathon: 1:03:48 (03/10/1993); Marathon: 2:14:58 (04/12/1994)

Salvatore Orgiana (born 12 October 1973) is a former Italian male long-distance runner who competed at individual senior level at the IAAF World Half Marathon Championships.
