= Miyoko Asahina =

Japanese long-distance runner

Miyoko Asahina (朝比奈三代子; born September 24, 1969) is a retired female long-distance runner from Japan. She set her personal best (2:25:52) in the women's marathon event on April 17, 1994, to win the Rotterdam Marathon.

== Achievements ==
Year	Competition	Venue	Position	Event	Notes
Representing Japan
1992	World Half Marathon Championships	Newcastle upon Tyne, United Kingdom	1st	Team Half Marathon	
1993	World Half Marathon Championships	Brussels, Belgium	2nd	Team Half Marathon	
1994	Rotterdam Marathon	Rotterdam, Netherlands	1st	Individual Marathon	
