= Lameck Aguta =

Kenyan long-distance runner

- Born: 10 October 1971 (age 54); Kenya
- Occupation: Marathon runner
- Notable work: winner of the 101st Boston Marathon in 1997

Lameck Aguta Orero (born October 10, 1971) is a former Kenyan marathon runner. He was the winner of the 101st Boston Marathon in 1997 with a time of 2:10:34 hours. He also competed in the men's marathon at the 1996 Summer Olympics.

== Biography ==
Aguta's personal best time in any marathon is 2:10:03 hours, achieved at the 1996 Boston Marathon. He finished fourth in that race, which was the 100th running of the Boston Marathon. His best time in the half marathon is 1:00:55 hours at the 1992 IAAF World Half Marathon Championships in South Shields, England.

Three months after winning the 1997 Boston Marathon, Aguta was the victim of a vicious robbery in his home country of Kenya during which he was clubbed in the back of the head after emerging from an auto accident. Thieves made off with approximately $10,000 of Aguta's earnings. He was in a coma for three months and nearly died. He would spend years struggling to move again. His health did improve and he attempted a comeback at racing by 2003. He ran the Dallas White Rock Marathon in 2004 before attempting to run Boston again in 2005. His time in the White Rock Marathon of 2004 was 2:34:04 and is considered a respectable time but not an elite time.

== Achievements ==
Year	Competition	Venue	Position	Event	Notes
Representing Kenya
1992	World Half Marathon Championships	Newcastle, United Kingdom	4th	Half marathon	1:00:55
1994	Boston Marathon	Boston, United States	14th	Marathon	2:11:19
1994	Commonwealth Games	Victoria, Canada	1st	10,000 m	28:38.22
1994	Berlin Marathon	Berlin, Germany	4th	Marathon	2:10:41
1995	Boston Marathon	Boston, United states	4th	Marathon	2:11:03
1996	Boston Marathon	Boston, United States	4th	Marathon	2:10:03
1996	Olympic Games	Atlanta, United States	52nd	Marathon	2:22:04
1997	Boston Marathon	Boston, United States	1st	Marathon	2:10:34
