= 1994 IAAF World Half Marathon Championships =

- Organisers: IAAF
- Edition: 3rd
- Date: September 24
- Host city: Oslo, Norway
- Events: 2
- Participation: 214 athletes from 48 nations

The 3rd IAAF World Half Marathon Championships was held on September 24, 1994, in Oslo, Norway. A total of 214 athletes, 127 men and 87 women, from 48 countries took part.

Complete results were published.

== Medallists ==
Event	Gold		Silver		Bronze	
Individual
Men	Khalid Skah (MAR)	1:00:27	Germán Silva (MEX)	1:00:28	Ronaldo da Costa (BRA)	1:00:54
Women	Elana Meyer (RSA)	1:08:36	Iulia Negura (ROU)	1:09:15	Anuța Cătună (ROU)	1:09:35
Team
Team Men	Kenya	3:03:36	Mexico	3:03:47	Morocco	3:05:58
Team Women	Romania	3:29:03	Norway	3:33:36	Japan	3:35:39

== Race results ==
=== Men's ===
Rank	Athlete	Nationality	Time	Notes
1st place, gold medalist(s)	Khalid Skah	Morocco	1:00:27	
2nd place, silver medalist(s)	Germán Silva	Mexico	1:00:28	
3rd place, bronze medalist(s)	Ronaldo da Costa	Brazil	1:00:54	
4	Godfrey Kiprotich	Kenya	1:01:01	
5	Shem Kororia	Kenya	1:01:16	
6	Andrew Masai	Kenya	1:01:19	
7	Tendai Chimusasa	Zimbabwe	1:01:26	
8	Fackson Nkandu	Zambia	1:01:30	NR
9	Moses Tanui	Kenya	1:01:35	
10	Rolando Vera	Ecuador	1:01:36	
11	Paul Tergat	Kenya	1:01:37	
12	Martín Pitayo	Mexico	1:01:38	
13	Bedilu Kibret	Ethiopia	1:01:40	
14	Benjamín Paredes	Mexico	1:01:41	
15	Carsten Eich	Germany	1:01:44	
16	Kamal Kohil	Algeria	1:01:50	
17	Addis Abebe	Ethiopia	1:02:14	
18	Salah Hissou	Morocco	1:02:20	
19	Samson Dingani	Zimbabwe	1:02:21	
20	Meshack Mogotsi	South Africa	1:02:26	
21	Taher Mansouri	Tunisia	1:02:27	
22	Luíz dos Santos	Brazil	1:02:28	
23	Fernando Couto	Portugal	1:02:28	
24	Javier Cortés	Spain	1:02:32	
25	Keita Fujino	Japan	1:02:36	
26	Adam Motlagale	South Africa	1:02:43	
27	Paul Arpin	France	1:02:44	
28	José Isidro Rico	Mexico	1:02:44	
29	Martin McLoughlin	Great Britain	1:02:45	
30	Daniel Held	United States	1:02:46	
31	João Lopes	Portugal	1:02:53	
32	Yuriy Chizhov	Russia	1:02:55	
33	Kidane Gebrmichael	Ethiopia	1:03:10	
34	Abdel Kader El-Mouaziz	Morocco	1:03:11	
35	Brighton Chipere	Zimbabwe	1:03:12	
36	Talal Omar Abdillahi	Djibouti	1:03:14	
37	Pascal Clouvel	France	1:03:16	
38	Omar Daher Ghadid	Djibouti	1:03:19	
39	Aleksey Korobov	Russia	1:03:21	
40	Arkadiy Tolstyn/Nikitin	Kyrgyzstan	1:03:24	
41	Andrey Tikhonov	Russia	1:03:25	
42	Ronny Ligneel	Belgium	1:03:26	
43	Terje Näss	Norway	1:03:27	
44	Hamid Essebani	Morocco	1:03:29	
45	Arnold Mächler	Switzerland	1:03:30	
46	Jorge Márquez	Mexico	1:03:36	
47	Carl Udall	Great Britain	1:03:36	
48	Sergey Fedotov	Russia	1:03:40	
49	Julio Hernández	Colombia	1:03:43	
50	Mahieddine Belhadj	Algeria	1:03:48	
51	Pedro Rojas	Colombia	1:03:50	
52	Kenjiro Jitsui	Japan	1:03:55	
53	Winston Muzini	Zimbabwe	1:03:57	
54	Michael Scheytt	Germany	1:03:59	
55	Christopher Campagne	France	1:04:00	
56	Konrad Dobler	Germany	1:04:01	
57	Joseph LeMay	United States	1:04:03	
58	José Dias	Portugal	1:04:21	
59	Tomix da Costa	Brazil	1:04:25	
60	Andrew Pearson	Great Britain	1:04:30	
61	Mark Croasdale	Great Britain	1:04:41	
62	Klaus-Peter Nabein	Germany	1:04:47	
63	Bigboy Goromonzi	Zimbabwe	1:04:48	
64	Mohamed Abdi Said	Djibouti	1:04:50	
65	Francis Mukuka	Zambia	1:04:51	
66	Pierre Lévisse	France	1:04:52	
67	Boris Batuyev	Belarus	1:04:54	
68	Vladimir Kiselyov	Kyrgyzstan	1:04:55	
69	Ayele Setegne	Israel	1:04:59	
70	René Godlieb	Netherlands	1:05:01	
71	Simon Morolong	South Africa	1:05:06	
72	Gennadiy Panin	Russia	1:05:10	
73	Peter Sichula	Zambia	1:05:11	
74	Peter De Vocht	Belgium	1:05:12	
75	Asaf Bimro	Israel	1:05:14	
76	Frank Pooe	South Africa	1:05:28	
77	Pavel Loskutov	Estonia	1:05:30	
78	Dan Nelson	United States	1:05:34	
79	Tayeb Kalloud	Algeria	1:05:36	
80	Daniel Gonzalez	United States	1:05:37	
81	Kiyoji Hayashi	Japan	1:05:41	
82	Markus Gerber	Switzerland	1:05:42	
83	Azzedine Sakhri	Algeria	1:05:45	
84	Toomas Tarm	Estonia	1:05:47	
85	Bertrand Itsweire	France	1:06:06	
86	Amit Neʼeman	Israel	1:06:12	
87	Viktor Rogovoy	Ukraine	1:06:18	
88	Marly Sopyev	Turkmenistan	1:06:24	
89	Svein Inge Buhaug	Norway	1:06:34	
90	Nazirdin Akylbekov	Kyrgyzstan	1:06:36	
91	Meck Mothuli	South Africa	1:06:41	
92	Tibor Nemes-Nagy	Hungary	1:06:41	
93	Miroslav Vanko	Slovakia	1:06:44	
94	Viktor Chumakov	Belarus	1:06:50	
95	Jan Bláha	Czech Republic	1:06:53	
96	Chuck Trujillo	United States	1:06:56	
97	Ivar Øyan	Norway	1:07:00	
98	Markus Graf	Switzerland	1:07:29	
99	Modise Mosarwa	Botswana	1:07:52	
100	Jun Kuroki	Japan	1:08:01	
101	Hansjörg Brücker	Switzerland	1:08:13	
102	Wayne Edgeler	New Zealand	1:08:14	
103	Ali Youssouf	Djibouti	1:08:15	
104	Lesedinyana Lekgoa	Botswana	1:08:15	
105	Ajay Chuttoo	Mauritius	1:08:17	
106	Andrew Peskett	New Zealand	1:08:26	
107	Andrey Kovalenko	Belarus	1:08:33	
108	Heiki Sarapuu	Estonia	1:08:38	
109	Charygeldiy Allaberdiyev	Turkmenistan	1:08:40	
110	Chala Kelele	Ethiopia	1:08:59	
111	Nazim Noorbux	Mauritius	1:10:07	
112	Alister Munroe	New Zealand	1:10:49	
113	Richard Muscat	Gibraltar	1:11:25	
114	Philip Harris	Gibraltar	1:12:25	
115	Lee Kar Lun	Hong Kong	1:12:27	
116	Fouad Obad	Yemen	1:12:47	
117	Parakhat Kurtgeldiyev	Turkmenistan	1:13:33	
118	Mohamed Al-Hada	Yemen	1:13:51	
119	Louis Chichon	Gibraltar	1:15:10	
120	Tom Kikina	Botswana	1:16:11	
121	Mohamed Al-Ahjari	Yemen	1:18:12	
—	Saïd Belhout	Algeria	DNF	
—	Aleksey Tarasyuk	Belarus	DNF	
—	Kurt Stenzel	Germany	DNF	
—	Frank Bjørkli	Norway	DNF	
—	Knut Hegvold	Norway	DNF	
—	Stéphane Schweickhardt	Switzerland	DNF	

=== Women's ===
Rank	Athlete	Nationality	Time	Notes
1st place, gold medalist(s)	Elana Meyer	South Africa	1:08:36	CR
2nd place, silver medalist(s)	Iulia Negura	Romania	1:09:15	
3rd place, bronze medalist(s)	Anuța Cătună	Romania	1:09:35	
4	Albertina Dias	Portugal	1:09:57	
5	Elena Fidatof	Romania	1:10:13	
6	Hilde Stavik	Norway	1:10:21	
7	Brynhild Synstnes	Norway	1:10:29	
8	Marleen Renders	Belgium	1:10:33	
9	Adriana Barbu	Romania	1:10:38	
10	Mari Tanigawa	Japan	1:10:43	
11	Fatuma Roba	Ethiopia	1:10:49	
12	Natalya Galushko	Belarus	1:11:00	
13	Alena Peterková	Czech Republic	1:11:02	
14	Alla Zhilyayeva	Russia	1:11:16	
15	Nicole Lévêque	France	1:11:54	
16	Klara Kashapova	Russia	1:12:04	
17	Martha Ernstdóttir	Iceland	1:12:15	
18	Stella Castro	Colombia	1:12:23	
19	Mineko Watanabe	Japan	1:12:26	
20	Yukari Komatsu	Japan	1:12:30	
21	Manuela Dias	Portugal	1:12:43	
22	Grete Kirkeberg	Norway	1:12:46	
23	Garifa Kuku	Kazakhstan	1:12:52	
24	Cathy Schum	Ireland	1:12:52	
25	Rosa Oliveira	Portugal	1:13:02	
26	Nadezhda Ilyina	Russia	1:13:05	
27	Nadezhda Tatarenkova	Russia	1:13:07	
28	Kornélia Pásztor	Hungary	1:13:12	
29	Danielle Sanderson	Great Britain	1:13:13	
30	Maiken Sørum	Norway	1:13:19	
31	Angie Hulley	Great Britain	1:13:19	
32	Eri Yamaguchi	Japan	1:13:21	
33	Lucía Rendón	Mexico	1:13:32	
34	Carmem de Oliveira	Brazil	1:13:33	
35	Ann Boyd	United States	1:13:35	
36	Grace de Oliveira	South Africa	1:13:36	
37	Anita Håkenstad	Norway	1:13:40	
38	Natalya Sorokivskaya	Kazakhstan	1:13:41	
39	Jane Salumäe	Estonia	1:13:47	
40	Susan Mahony	Australia	1:13:50	
41	Carla Beurskens	Netherlands	1:13:51	
42	Fikirte Woldemichael	Ethiopia	1:13:53	
43	Albertina Machado	Portugal	1:13:58	
44	Fantaye Sirak	Ethiopia	1:14:00	
45	Yumi Akao	Japan	1:14:05	
46	Heather Heasman	Great Britain	1:14:06	
47	Cath Mijovic	Great Britain	1:14:15	
48	Yelena Mazovka	Belarus	1:14:16	
49	Heather Turland	Australia	1:14:17	
50	Yelena Vinitskaya	Belarus	1:14:18	
51	Julie Petersen	United States	1:14:21	
52	Márta Visnyei	Hungary	1:14:25	
53	Christine Mallo	France	1:14:27	
54	Muriel Linsolas	France	1:14:33	
55	Nicole Whiteford	South Africa	1:14:38	
56	Elfenesh Alemu	Ethiopia	1:14:39	
57	Lorraine Davis	Australia	1:14:48	
58	Midde Hamrin	Sweden	1:14:53	
59	Ana Maria Mejía	Mexico	1:15:01	
60	Emma Cabrera	Mexico	1:15:14	
61	Jane Welzel	United States	1:15:24	
62	Christine Toonstra	Netherlands	1:15:32	
63	Marietjie McDermott	South Africa	1:15:37	
64	Gadissie Edato	Ethiopia	1:15:39	
65	Marta Durán	Mexico	1:15:44	
66	Lesley Morton	New Zealand	1:15:47	
67	Delirde Bernardi	Brazil	1:15:48	
68	Irina Bogachova	Kyrgyzstan	1:15:51	
69	Josette Janin	France	1:15:55	
70	Ingmarie Nilsson	Sweden	1:15:56	
71	Maria Lundgren	Sweden	1:16:15	
72	Marian Sutton	Great Britain	1:16:15	
73	Sonja Laxton	South Africa	1:16:46	
74	Éva Nagy	Hungary	1:16:57	
75	Yelena Mostovaya	Kazakhstan	1:16:58	
76	Olga Yudenkova	Belarus	1:17:34	
77	Winnie Ng	Hong Kong	1:17:37	
78	Kamila Gradus	Poland	1:18:44	
79	Monique Ecker	United States	1:19:37	
80	Anna Cosser	Iceland	1:22:50	
81	Nemia Coca	Bolivia	1:24:16	
82	Hulda Pálsdóttir	Iceland	1:27:30	
83	Olga Shiyanova	Turkmenistan	1:28:29	
84	Josiane Nairac-Boullé	Mauritius	1:32:15	
85	Maisa Tcharyeva	Turkmenistan	1:38:14	
—	Firiya Sultanova	Russia	DNF	
—	Jennifer Martin	United States	DNF	

== Team Results ==
=== Men's ===
Rank	Country	Team	Time
1st place, gold medalist(s)	Kenya	Godfrey Kiprotich; Shem Kororia; Andrew Masai	3:03:36
2nd place, silver medalist(s)	Mexico	Germán Silva; Martín Pitayo; Benjamín Paredes	3:03:47
3rd place, bronze medalist(s)	Morocco	Khalid Skah; Salah Hissou; Abdel Kader El-Mouaziz	3:05:58
4	Zimbabwe	Tendai Chimusasa; Samson Dingani; Brighton Chipere	3:06:59
5	Ethiopia	Bedilu Kibret; Addis Abebe; Kidane Gebrmichael	3:07:04
6	Brazil	Ronaldo da Costa; Luíz dos Santos; Tomix da Costa	3:07:47
7	Russia	Yuriy Chizhov; Aleksey Korobov; Andrey Tikhonov	3:09:41
8	Portugal	Fernando Couto; João Lopes; José Dias	3:09:42
9	Germany	Carsten Eich; Michael Scheytt; Konrad Dobler	3:09:44
10	France	Paul Arpin; Pascal Clouvel; Christopher Campagne	3:10:00
11	South Africa	Meshack Mogotsi; Adam Motlagale; Simon Morolong	3:10:15
12	Great Britain	Martin McLoughlin; Carl Udall; Andrew Pearson	3:10:51
13	Algeria	Kamal Kohil; Mahieddine Belhadj; Tayeb Kalloud	3:11:14
14	Djibouti	Talal Omar Abdillahi; Omar Daher Ghadid; Mohamed Abdi Said	3:11:23
15	Zambia	Fackson Nkandu; Francis Mukuka; Peter Sichula	3:11:32
16	Japan	Keita Fujino; Kenjiro Jitsui; Kiyoji Hayashi	3:12:12
17	United States	Daniel Held; Joseph LeMay; Dan Nelson	3:12:23
18	Kyrgyzstan	Arkadiy Tolstyn/Nikitin; Vladimir Kiselyov; Nazirdin Akylbekov	3:14:55
19	Israel	Ayele Setegne; Asaf Bimro; Amit Neʼeman	3:16:25
20	Switzerland	Arnold Mächler; Markus Gerber; Markus Graf	3:16:41
21	Norway	Terje Näss; Svein Inge Buhaug; Ivar Øyan	3:17:01
22	Estonia	Pavel Loskutov; Toomas Tarm; Heiki Sarapuu	3:19:55
23	Belarus	Boris Batuyev; Viktor Chumakov; Andrey Kovalenko	3:20:17
24	New Zealand	Wayne Edgeler; Andrew Peskett; Alister Munroe	3:27:29
25	Turkmenistan	Marly Sopyev; Charygeldiy Allaberdiyev; Parakhat Kurtgeldiyev	3:28:37
26	Botswana	Modise Mosarwa; Lesedinyana Lekgoa; Tom Kikina	3:32:18
27	Gibraltar	Richard Muscat; Philip Harris; Louis Chichon	3:39:00
28	Yemen	Fouad Obad; Mohamed Al-Hada; Mohamed Al-Ahjari	3:44:50

=== Women's ===
Rank	Country	Team	Time
1st place, gold medalist(s)	Romania	Iulia Negura; Anuța Cătună; Elena Fidatof	3:29:03 CR
2nd place, silver medalist(s)	Norway	Hilde Stavik; Brynhild Synstnes; Grete Kirkeberg	3:33:36
3rd place, bronze medalist(s)	Japan	Mari Tanigawa; Mineko Watanabe; Yukari Komatsu	3:35:39
4	Portugal	Albertina Dias; Manuela Dias; Rosa Oliveira	3:35:42
5	Russia	Alla Zhilyayeva; Klara Kashapova; Nadezhda Ilyina	3:36:25
6	South Africa	Elana Meyer; Grace de Oliveira; Nicole Whiteford	3:36:50
7	Ethiopia	Fatuma Roba; Fikirte Woldemichael; Fantaye Sirak	3:38:42
8	Belarus	Natalya Galushko; Yelena Mazovka; Yelena Vinitskaya	3:39:34
9	Great Britain	Danielle Sanderson; Angie Hulley; Heather Heasman	3:40:38
10	France	Nicole Lévêque; Christine Mallo; Muriel Linsolas	3:40:54
11	Australia	Susan Mahony; Heather Turland; Lorraine Davis	3:42:55
12	United States	Ann Boyd; Julie Petersen; Jane Welzel	3:43:20
13	Kazakhstan	Garifa Kuku; Natalya Sorokivskaya; Yelena Mostovaya	3:43:31
14	Mexico	Lucía Rendón; Ana Maria Mejía; Emma Cabrera	3:43:47
15	Hungary	Kornélia Pásztor; Márta Visnyei; Éva Nagy	3:44:34
16	Sweden	Midde Hamrin; Ingmarie Nilsson; Maria Lundgren	3:47:04
17	Iceland	Martha Ernstdóttir; Anna Cosser; Hulda Pálsdóttir	4:02:35

== Participation ==
The participation of 214 athletes (127 men/87 women) from 48 countries is reported.

- Algeria (5)
- Australia (3)
- Belarus (8)
- Belgium (3)
- Bolivia (1)
- Botswana (3)
- Brazil (5)
- Colombia (3)
- Czech Republic (2)
- Djibouti (4)
- Ecuador (1)
- Estonia (4)
- Ethiopia (9)
- France (9)
- Germany (5)
- Gibraltar (3)
- Hong Kong (2)
- Hungary (4)
- Iceland (3)
- Ireland (1)
- Israel (3)
- Japan (9)
- Kazakhstan (3)
- Kenya (5)
- Kyrgyzstan (4)
- Morocco (4)
- Mauritius (3)
- Mexico (9)
- Netherlands (3)
- New Zealand (4)
- Norway (10)
- Poland (1)
- Portugal (7)
- Romania (4)
- Russia (10)
- Slovakia (1)
- South Africa (10)
- Spain (1)
- Sweden (3)
- Switzerland (5)
- Tunisia (1)
- Turkmenistan (5)
- Ukraine (1)
- United Kingdom (9)
- United States (10)
- Yemen (3)
- Zambia (3)
- Zimbabwe (5)

== See also ==
- 1994 in athletics (track and field)
