= 1986 World Junior Championships in Athletics – Men's 20 kilometres road run =

The men's 20 kilometres road run event at the 1986 World Junior Championships in Athletics was held in Athens, Greece, on 20 July.

== Medalists ==
Gold	Tadesse Gebre; Ethiopia
Silver	Juma Mnyampanda; Tanzania
Bronze	Negash Dube; Ethiopia

== Results ==
=== Final ===
20 July

Rank	Name	Nationality	Time	Notes
1st place, gold medalist(s)	Tadesse Gebre	Ethiopia	1:01:32	
2nd place, silver medalist(s)	Juma Mnyampanda	Tanzania	1:01:45	
3rd place, bronze medalist(s)	Negash Dube	Ethiopia	1:04:23	
4	Stephan Freigang	East Germany	1:04:52	
5	Siarhei Sokov	Soviet Union	1:04:58	
6	Stephen Spiers	Australia	1:05:01	
7	Talal Omar Abdillahi	Djibouti	1:05:58	
8	Hoche Yaya Aden	Djibouti	1:05:59	
9	Alejandro Aros	Chile	1:06:13	
10	József Kovács	Hungary	1:06:26	
11	Orlando Santiago	Puerto Rico	1:07:02	
12	Jacky Puech	France	1:07:25	
13	Sándor Barcza	Hungary	1:07:42	
14	Francisco García	Mexico	1:07:55	
15	Thierry Vera	France	1:08:05	
16	Brian Walter	United States	1:08:14	
17	Grigorios Georgitsas	Greece	1:10:09	
18	Konstadínos Kourdís	Greece	1:11:35	
19	Philip Ellis	Canada	1:12:05	
20	Benjamin Vilakati	Swaziland	1:12:08	
21	Boukary Ouédraogo	Burkina Faso	1:14:28	
22	Aleksandr Kostikov	Soviet Union	1:15:16	
23	Thabiso Moqhali	Lesotho	1:20:57	
24	Marc Davis	United States	1:29:13	
	Gino Van Geyte	Belgium	DNF	
	Anthony Ford	Australia	DNF	
	Luigi Bentavegna	Italy	DNF	
	Tom Bessai	Canada	DNF	

== Participation ==
According to an unofficial count, 28 athletes from 19 countries participated in the event.

- Australia (2)
- Belgium (1)
- Burkina Faso (1)
- Canada (2)
- Chile (1)
- Djibouti (2)
- East Germany (1)
- Ethiopia (2)
- France (2)
- Greece (2)
- Hungary (2)
- Italy (1)
- Lesotho (1)
- Mexico (1)
- Puerto Rico (1)
- Soviet Union (2)
- Swaziland (1)
- Tanzania (1)
- United States (2)
