= Giro al Sas =

Coordinates: 46°04′04″N 11°07′17″E

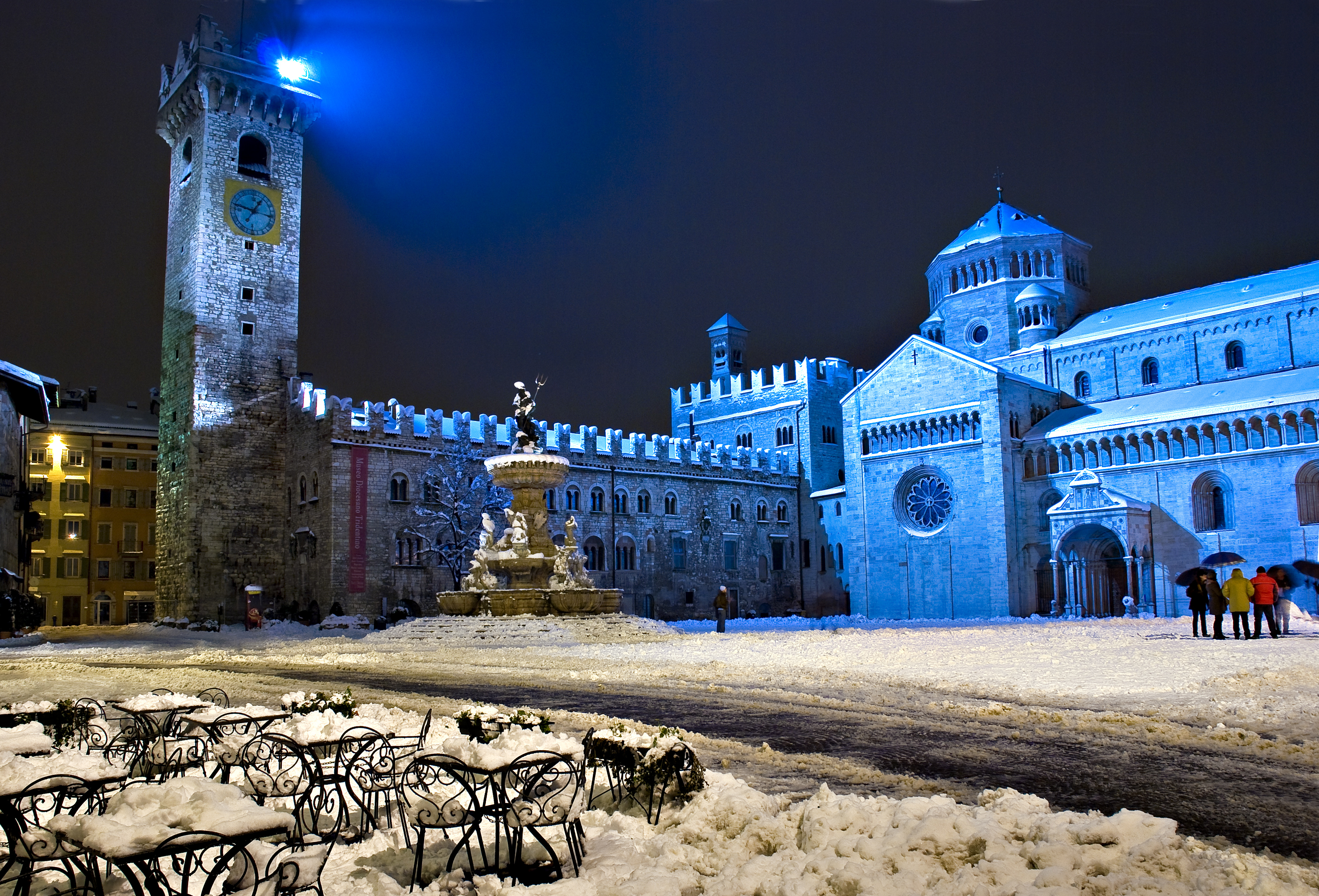
- The Piazza del Duomo is the race start and finish point
- Date: Mid-October
- Location: Trento, Italy
- Event type: Road
- Distance: 10 km
- Established: 1907
- Website: Giro al Sas

The Giro al Sas, also known as the Giro Podistico di Trento and the Giro Internazionale Città di Trento, is an annual 10-kilometre road running competition for men which takes place in October in the city of Trento, Italy.

First held as a part of celebrations for Saint Vigilius of Trent in 1907, the competition was interrupted by World Wars but has been held virtually every year since 1945. This makes it one of Europe's longest-running competitions of its type. The race has been won by some of Italy's most successful long-distance runners, including Stefano Baldini, as well as elite foreign athletes such as Paul Tergat and Kenenisa Bekele.

The race is held within the city centre and starts and finishes at Piazza del Duomo. The name of the race, roughly translated as the Sas Circuit, derives from the fact that the course features ten kilometre-long loops on the main city streets – which are locally referred to as al Sas.

The running event should not be confused with the similarly named Giro del Trentino – a road cycling competition which the city has hosted since 1963.

== History ==
The history of the competition can be traced back to 1907 when a community group organised a race on the city streets of roughly 6 km as part of the festival of Saint Vigilius of Trent. Domenico Gottin, a runner from Veneto, was the first to cross the line but he was later disqualified for taking a short cut, leaving Isidoro Trenner (a member of the local sports club) as the winner of the inaugural race. The race became an annual tradition, although it ceased during World War I.

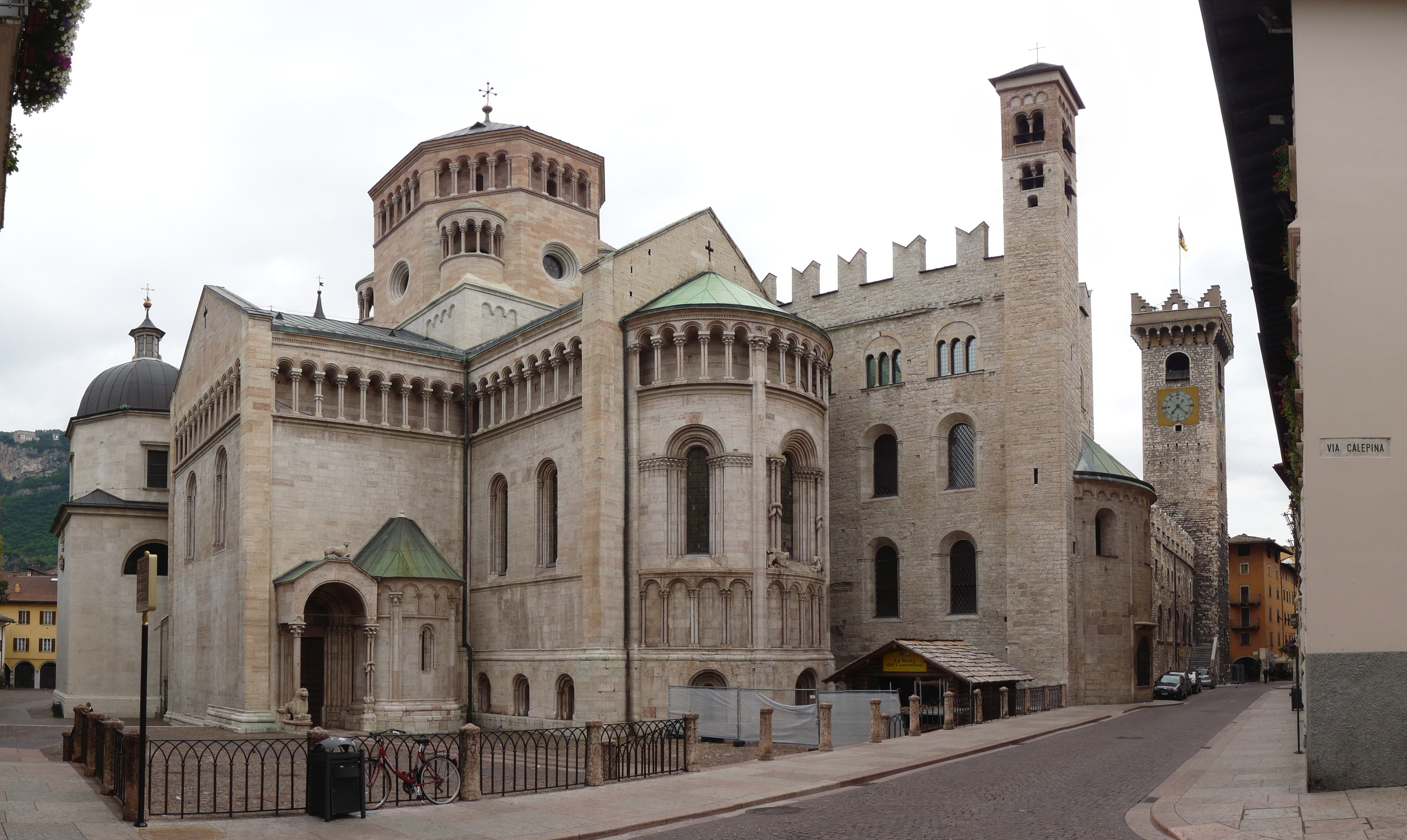
Trento Cathedral is central to the race circuit.

It re-emerged in the post-war period and gained its current moniker of the Giro al Sas at this point – a name roughly meaning the Sas Circuit, which derived from the race's looped course on the city's main streets which were known as the Sas. The running competition was placed on hiatus from 1940–44 due to World War II. The Giro al Sas returned to the streets in November 1945, just months after the Italy's surrender to the Allied Forces.

After the wars, the race entered a new, uninterrupted era (with the exception of 1991 and 1996) and gradually became international in nature with elite athlete competition. Alongside other Italian races, such as the Giro di Castelbuono, it is among the oldest road running competitions which continue to the present day. The current race director is Gianni Demadonna, a former athlete and athletics manager who won the race three times in his running career. Among the prominent competitors of the race's history is Stefano Baldini, the 2004 Olympic marathon champion, who competed in 18 editions and won on three occasions. He set the 2010 race as his final outing of his successful career, although an injury forced him to miss of the competition. Other significant winners include Franjo Mihalić, Francesco Panetta, Paul Tergat, and Kenenisa Bekele.

== Course and records ==
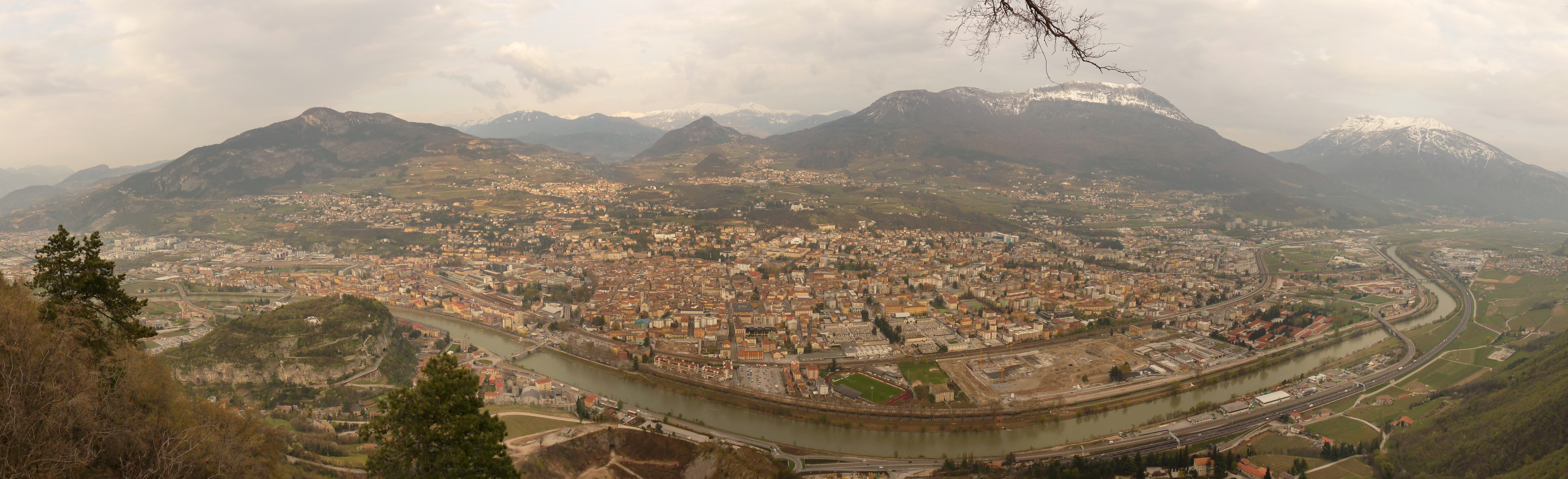
An overview of the city and the streets where the race takes place

The course of the race has varied through its history: it was a 15 km race in the 1960s, before existing as a 12 km circuit from 1970 to the mid-1990s. From 1997 to 2004, the race typically featured ten laps spanning 10.9 km. It has been a 10 km race from 2005 to present. The current course of ten 1 km laps features many twists and bends as it traces a circular loop around the central city streets, making fast times difficult to achieve in the Trento race.

Paul Kimaiyo Kimugul of Kenya holds the fastest time for the 10 km distance via his winning run of 28:00 minutes from 2005. Over the 10.9 km circuit, another Kenyan – Paul Kosgei Malakwen – has the course record with 30:46 minutes. Although it has almost exclusively been a men's race only for its entire history, a women's competition was added to the programme for the 2005 edition – this 10 km race was won in 33:15 minutes by Bruna Genovese, an Italian professional marathon runner.

== Past winners ==
Little information about the race (or its winners) in its early history is available and the modern competition regards its post-war rebirth in 1945 as the start of its modern, continuous lineage.

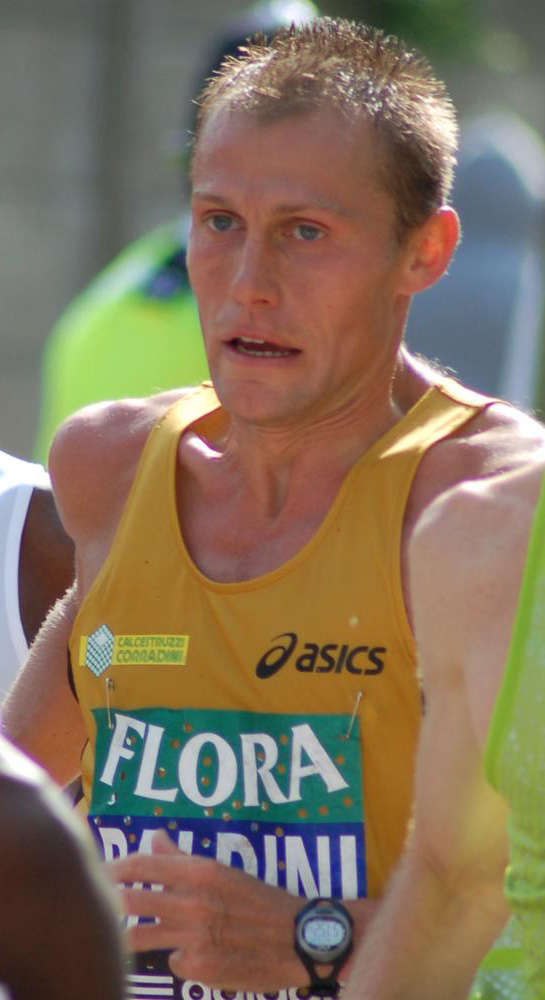
Italy's Stefano Baldini is a three-time winner of the race.

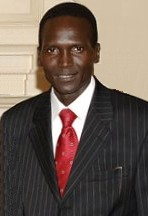
Former world record holder Paul Tergat was victorious at the 1997 race.

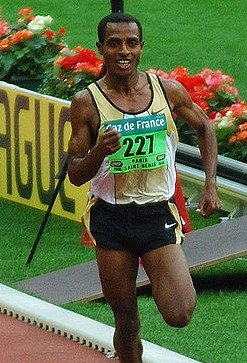
Kenenisa Bekele, a multiple Olympic champion on the track, won in 2001.

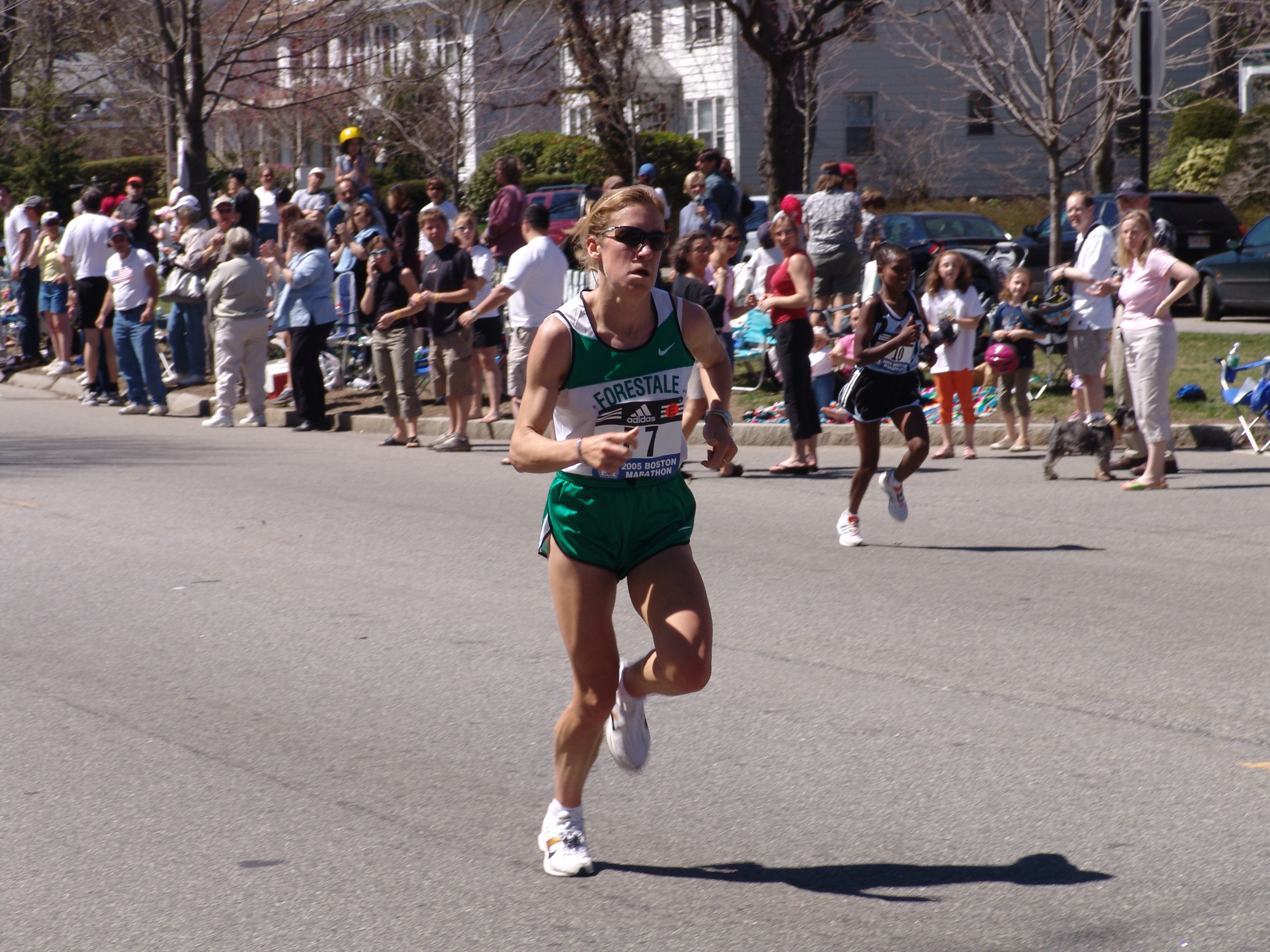
A one-off women's race in 2005 was won by Bruna Genovese.

Key: 12 km race 10.9 km race 10 km race

Year	Men's winner	Time (m:s)
1945	Elvio Schiavini (ITA)	?
1946	Giovanni Nocco (ITA)	?
1947	Giovanni Nocco (ITA)	?
1948	? Roetzer (AUT)	?
1949	Giuseppe Beviacqua (ITA)	?
1950	Giovanni Nocco (ITA)	?
1951	? Ceraj (YUG)	?
1952	? Page (SUI)	?
1953	Walter Konrad (GER)	?
1954	D Stritof (YUG)	?
1955	Walter Konrad (GER)	?
1956	Giacomo Peppicelli (ITA)	?
1957	Franjo Mihalić (YUG)	?
1958	Silvio de Florentis (ITA)	?
1959	Franjo Mihalić (YUG)	?
1960	Franjo Mihalić (YUG)	?
1961	Antonio Ambu (ITA)	?
1962	Franco Antonelli (ITA)	?
1963	Nedjalko Farcic (YUG)	48:0 (15 km)
1964	Antonio Ambu (ITA)	?
1965	Antonio Ambu (ITA)	?
1966	Antonio Ambu (ITA)	?
1967	Antonio Ambu (ITA)	?
1968	Antonio Ambu (ITA)	?
1969	Antonio Ambu (ITA)	?
1970	Lutz Philipp (GER)	35:56
1971	Giuseppe Ardizzone (ITA)	36:36.2
1972	Werner Dössegger (SUI)	36:39.3
1973	Werner Dössegger (SUI)	?
1974	Luigi Lauro (ITA)	?
1975	Primo Gretter (ITA)	37:52.2
1976	Primo Gretter (ITA)	37:47
1977	Luigi Zarcone (ITA)	?
1978	Domingo Tibaduiza (COL)	36:47.9
1979	Luigi Zarcone (ITA)	?
1980	Gianni Demadonna (ITA)	36:45.2
1981	Venanzio Ortis (ITA)	36:50.1
1982	Robert McDonald (AUS)	36:42.9
1983	Gianni Demadonna (ITA)	36:18.4
1984	Mike McLeod (ENG)	37:13.3
1985	Gianni Demadonna (ITA)	37:00.1
1986	Andrew Masai (KEN)	36:55.3
1987	Francesco Panetta (ITA)	35:57.8
1988	Francesco Panetta (ITA)	35:43.7
1989	Said Ermili (MAR)	36:32.7
1990	Abderrahim Zitouna (MAR)	28:01.4
1991	Not held	
1992	Eliud Barngetuny (KEN)	35:04
1993	Thierry Pantel (FRA)	36:04
1994	Jonah Koech Kimurgor (KEN)	35:53.2
1995	Andrew Masai (KEN)	35:58.5
1996	Not held	
1997	Paul Tergat (KEN)	31:15
1998	Giuliano Battocletti (ITA)	?
1999	John Cheruiyot Korir (KEN)	31:05
2000	Paul Kosgei Malakwen (KEN)	30:46
2001	Kenenisa Bekele (ETH)	30:49
2002	Stefano Baldini (ITA)	30:50.6
2003	Martin Sulle (TAN)	28:34
2004	Stefano Baldini (ITA)	31:21.1
2005	Paul Kimaiyo Kimugul (KEN)	28:00
2006	Stefano Baldini (ITA)	28:43
2007	Moses Mosop (KEN)	29:59 (10.5 km)
2008	Moses Mosop (KEN)	28:29
2009	Edwin Soi (KEN)	29:25
2010	Edwin Soi (KEN)	28:45.9
2011	Edwin Soi (KEN)	29:16
2012	Edwin Soi (KEN)	28:43
2013	Edwin Soi (KEN)	29:01
2014	Muktar Edris (ETH)	28:52
2015	Muktar Edris (ETH)	28:46
2016	Abdallah Mande (UGA)	28:47
2017	Muktar Edris (ETH)	28:54
2018	Jacob Kiplimo (UGA)	28:17
2019	Telahun Bekele (ETH)	28:09
2021	Muktar Edris (ETH)	28:13

== Statistics ==
=== Winners by country ===
Country	Wins
Italy	31
Kenya	15
Yugoslavia	6
Germany	3
Switzerland	3
Ethiopia	4
Morocco	2
Australia	1
Austria	1
Colombia	1
England	1
France	1
Tanzania	1
Totals
13	65

=== Multiple winners ===
Athlete	Country	Wins	Years
Antonio Ambu	Italy	7	1961, 1964–1969
Edwin Soi	Kenya	5	2009–2013
Giovanni Nocco	Italy	3	1946, 1947, 1950
Franjo Mihalić	Yugoslavia	3	1957, 1959, 1960
Gianni Demadonna	Italy	3	1980, 1983, 1985
Stefano Baldini	Italy	3	2002, 2004, 2006
Moses Mosop	Kenya	2	2007, 2008
Andrew Masai	Kenya	2	1986, 1995
Francesco Panetta	Italy	2	1987, 1988
Luigi Zarcone	Italy	2	1977, 1979
Primo Gretter	Italy	2	1975, 1976
Werner Dössegger	Switzerland	2	1972, 1973
Walter Konrad	Germany	2	1953, 1955

== See also ==
- BOclassic
- Memorial Peppe Greco
