= 1985 African Cross Country Championships =

- Organisers: CAA
- Edition: Trial
- Date: 16 February 1985
- Host city: Nairobi, Kenya
- Events: 3
- Participation: 72 athletes from 8 nations

The 1985 African Cross Country Championships was the first trial edition of the international cross country running competition for African athletes organised by the Confederation of African Athletics. It was held on 16 February in Nairobi, Kenya and would be the only African cross-country championship until its re-launch in 2011.

There were three races on the program: 12 km for senior men, 4 km for senior women, and 8 km for under-20 men. 72 athletes from eight countries participated, consisting of Kenya, Uganda, Zimbabwe, Lesotho, Tanzania, Somalia, Egypt, and Djibouti.

Kenya swept all team and individual gold medals. The competition was said to have attracted mostly Kenyans and other neighbors.

== Medallists ==
Event	Gold		Silver		Bronze	
Senior men's 12 km	Paul Kipkoech (KEN)		Andrew Masai (KEN)		Joshua Kipkemboi (KEN)	
Senior men's team	Kenya	21 pts	Uganda	83 pts	Tanzania	141 pts
Senior women's 4 km	Hellen Kimaiyo (KEN)		Marcelina Cheboi (KEN)		Florence Mwangechi (KEN)	
Senior women's team	Kenya	10 pts	Tanzania	40 pts	Uganda	44 pts
U20 men's 8 km	Peter Rono (KEN)		Jeremiah Chelego (KEN)		Samuel Okemwa (KEN)	
U20 men's team	Kenya	10 pts	Djibouti	32 pts	Uganda	46 pts

== Results ==
=== Senior races ===
Senior men's race
Place	Athlete	Country	Time
1st place, gold medalist(s)	Paul Kipkoech	Kenya	
2nd place, silver medalist(s)	Andrew Masai	Kenya	
3rd place, bronze medalist(s)	Joshua Kipkemboi	Kenya	
4th	Jackson Ruto	Kenya	
5th	James Kipngetich	Kenya	
6th	Alfred Nyasani	Kenya	
7th	Unknown	Unknown	
8th	Unknown	Unknown	
9th	Unknown	Unknown	
10th	Elly Mirembe	Uganda	
11th	Unknown	Unknown	
12th	Wilson Achia	Uganda	
13th	Pius Lonika	Uganda	
14th	Juma Mnyampanda	Tanzania	
15th	Vincent Rugua	Uganda	
16th	Hillmark Lobunei	Uganda	
17th	Benjamin Longris	Uganda	
18th	Jackson Hallot	Tanzania	
19th	Unknown	Unknown	
20th	Japhet Mashishanga	Tanzania	
21st	Unknown	Unknown	
22nd	Unknown	Unknown	
23rd	Francis John	Tanzania	
24th	Unknown	Unknown	
25th	Unknown	Unknown	
26th	Unknown	Unknown	
27th	Unknown	Unknown	
28th	Unknown	Unknown	
29th	Unknown	Unknown	
30th	Jacob Lubinza	Tanzania	
31st	Unknown	Unknown	
32nd	Unknown	Unknown	
33rd	Unknown	Unknown	
34th	Ida Bunda	Tanzania	

Senior women's race
Place	Athlete	Country	Time
1st place, gold medalist(s)	Hellen Kimaiyo	Kenya	
2nd place, silver medalist(s)	Marcelina Cheboi	Kenya	
3rd place, bronze medalist(s)	Florence Mwangechi	Kenya	
4th	Jepkemoi Barmasai	Kenya	
5th	Unknown	Unknown	
6th	Unknown	Unknown	
7th	Lilian Nyiti	Tanzania	
8th	Marcelina Emmanuel	Tanzania	
9th	Beatrice Namatovu	Uganda	
10th	Grace Kabhweza	Uganda	
11th	Consolata Makune	Uganda	
12th	Graciana Bungu	Tanzania	
13th	Rajawu Mwajuma	Tanzania	
14th	Mary Lalam	Uganda	

=== U20 race ===
U20 men's race
Place	Athlete	Country	Time
1st place, gold medalist(s)	Peter Rono	Kenya	
2nd place, silver medalist(s)	Jeremiah Chelego	Kenya	
3rd place, bronze medalist(s)	Samuel Okemwa	Kenya	
4th	Ngotho Musyoki	Kenya	
5th	Talal Omar Abdillahi	Djibouti	
6th	Yaye Aden	Djibouti	
7th	Patrick Baguma	Uganda	
8th	Unknown	Unknown	
9th	Unknown	Unknown	
10th	Robleh Hussein	Djibouti	
11th	Iltireh Djama	Djibouti	
12th	Vincent Lyoda	Uganda	
13th	Patrick Shaka	Uganda	
14th	Gabriel Omuna	Uganda	

== See also ==
- 1985 IAAF World Cross Country Championships
- 1985 NCAA Division I cross country championships
