= Chepkoya =

- Location in Kenya
- Coordinates: 00°47′00″N 34°45′00″E
- Country: Kenya

Population (2009)
  - Total: 2,134

Chepkoya is a village found in Kaptalelio sub-location, Kongit location, Kaptama division of Bungoma County in western Kenya. It borders a forest known as Chesamo. Many people in the village are farmers. It has the population of 2134 people according to the census conducted in 2009. It is the birthplace of famous runners such as Andrew Masai, Edith Masai, Titus Kwemoi and Gilbert Masai. Sprinter Joy Nakhumicha Sakari was also born there.
