= Giro di Trento =

Giro di Trento may refer to:

- Giro al Sas, an annual road running event in Trento, Italy
- Giro del Trentino, an annual road cycling competition which passes through the same city
