= Athletics at the 1981 Summer Universiade – Women's 1500 metres =

The women's 1500 metres event at the 1981 Summer Universiade was held at the Stadionul Naţional in Bucharest on 21 and 22 July 1981.

== Medalists ==
Gold	Silver	Bronze
Gabriella Dorio; Italy	Doina Melinte; Romania	Olga Dvirna; Soviet Union

== Results ==
=== Heats ===
Rank	Heat	Athlete	Nationality	Time	Notes
1	1	Olga Dvirna	Soviet Union	4:18.78	Q
2	1	Maria Radu	Romania	4:18.83	Q
3	1	Breda Pergar	Yugoslavia	4:21.83	Q
4	1	Maggie Keyes	United States	4:22.63	Q
5	1	Mercedes Calleja	Spain	4:27.43	Q
6	1	Eloína Kerr	Cuba	4:33.01	
7	1	Susana Herrera	Mexico	4:37.86	
8	1	Hala El-Moughrabi	Syria	4:44.64	
1	2	Gabriella Dorio	Italy	4:16.00	Q
2	2	Doina Melinte	Romania	4:16.27	Q
3	2	Ravilya Agletdinova	Soviet Union	4:18.39	Q
4	2	Wendy Smith	Great Britain	4:18.54	Q
5	2	Linda Goen	United States	4:19.18	Q
7	2	Katharina Sävestrand	Sweden	4:23.31	q
8	2	Gloria Pallé	Spain	4:23.52	q
9	2	Sergia Martínez	Cuba	4:23.70	q
10	2	Angelita Lind	Puerto Rico	4:25.50	q
11	2	Tuija Toivonen	Finland	4:25.93	

=== Final ===
Rank	Athlete	Nationality	Time	Notes
1st place, gold medalist(s)	Gabriella Dorio	Italy	4:05.35	UR
2nd place, silver medalist(s)	Doina Melinte	Romania	4:05.74	
3rd place, bronze medalist(s)	Olga Dvirna	Soviet Union	4:06.39	
4	Ravilya Agletdinova	Soviet Union	4:07.03	
5	Maria Radu	Romania	4:10.28	
6	Wendy Smith	Great Britain	4:10.76	
8	Breda Pergar	Yugoslavia	4:12.95	
9	Mercedes Calleja	Spain	4:15.38	
10	Maggie Keyes	United States	4:15.59	
11	Linda Goen	United States	4:16.03	
12	Gloria Pallé	Spain	4:18.03	PB
13	Katharina Sävestrand	Sweden	4:19.44	
14	Sergia Martínez	Cuba	4:34.18	
	Angelita Lind	Puerto Rico	DNF	
