= Peter Chumba =

Kenyan long-distance runner

Peter Chumba (born 20 December 1968) is a Kenyan male former long-distance runner. He was the first athlete to achieve a gold medal double at the IAAF World Junior Championships in Athletics, taking victory in the 5000 metres and 10,000 metres. This feat has since been matched by Haile Gebrselassie, Daniel Komen and Assefa Mezgebu. While all three of those athletes won senior medals at global level, this feat would remain the highlight of Chumba's career.

== International competitions ==
| Year | Competition | Venue | Position | Event | Notes |
|---|---|---|---|---|---|
| 1986 | World Junior Championships | Athens, Greece | 1st | 5000 m | 13:55.25 |
| 1986 | World Junior Championships | Athens, Greece | 1st | 10,000 m | 28:44.00 |
