= Marc Davis (runner) =

American track and field athlete (born 1969)

Personal information
- Born: December 17, 1969 (age 56) Oceanside, California, U.S.
Medal record
Men's athletics (track and field)
Representing United States
Goodwill Games
| Gold medal – first place | 1994 Saint Petersburg | 3000&m Steeplechase |

Marc Davis (born December 17, 1969) is an American retired track and field athlete, who mainly competed in distance races like the men's 3000 metres steeplechase and 5000 metres. His personal bests include running 3:54.30 for the mile, 8:14.26 in the steeplechase and 8:12.74 for 2 Miles.

Davis first gained fame while running for San Diego High School (the same alma mater as American distance star Meb Keflezighi), winning the 1986 Foot Locker Cross Country Championships - which at the time was the only high school national championship contested - on his home course before a national TV audience.

Davis went on to run for the University of Arizona, winning the 1992 3000m Steeple Chase NCAA Men's Outdoor Track and Field Championships.

As a professional, he won the 1993 USA Outdoor Track and Field Championships 3000m Steeplechase, and in 1998 he won the USATF 5000 metres. On the roads he won the 1997 USATF National 5K Championship. Davis ran an American Record time of 13:24 for the 5K on the roads in 1996, and that record lasted 19 years until Ben True broke it in 2015.

At the 1996 Summer Olympics, Davis won his semi-final in the steeplechase, but because of an injury, he finished only 12th in the final.

In 1998, Davis represented the United States in the IAAF World Cross Country Championships in Marrakesh, Morocco, placing 8th overall in the 4K race.

== Personal bests ==
| Year | Event | Time |
|---|---|---|
| 1993 | 1500 meters | 3:36.31 |
| 1997 | Mile | 3:54.30 |
| 1994 | 2000m (en route) | 5:07.17 |
| 1993 | 3000m Steeplechase | 8:14.26 |
| 1994 | 2 Miles | 8:12.74 |
| 2000 | 5000m | 13:27.05 |
| 1996 | 5K (Road) | 13:24 |

== International competitions ==
| Year | Competition | Venue | Position | Event | Notes |
Representing the United States
| 1986 | World Junior Championships | Athens, Greece | 24th | 20 km road run | 1:29:13 |
| 1993 | World Championships | Stuttgart, Germany | 11th | 3000 m steeple | 8:28.74 |
| 1994 | Goodwill Games | Saint Petersburg, Russia | 1st | 3000 m steeple | 8:14.30 |
| 1996 | Olympic Games | Atlanta, United States | 12th | 3000 m steeple | 9:51.96 |
| 1998 | Goodwill Games | New York City, United States | 6th | 5000 m | 13:50.84 |
