= Andrew Masai =

Kenyan long-distance runner

Medal record

Men's athletics

Representing Kenya

IAAF World Half Marathon Championships
Gold medal – first place	1994 Oslo	Team

IAAF World Cross Country Championships
Gold medal – first place	1989 Stavanger	Team
Gold medal – first place	1987 Warsaw	Team
Gold medal – first place	1986 Colombier	Team
Gold medal – first place	1985 Lisbon	Team

African Cross Country Championships
Silver medal – second place	1985 Nairobi	Senior race
Gold medal – first place	1985 Nairobi	Team

Andrew Masai (born 13 December 1960) is a Kenyan former long-distance runner who competed in road running and cross country running events. He was one of Kenya's best cross country runners in the late 1980s, taking six team gold medals at the IAAF World Cross Country Championships. His best individual finish at that competition was sixth in 1987. He was key to the rise of Kenya in cross country, helping the nation to its first team title and scoring points which helped establish an unbeaten streak in the team race which lasted from 1986 to 2003.

He was also a silver medallist at the African Cross Country Championships in 1985. He was a one-time national champion, taking the long-course Kenyan title in 1991.

A member of the Sabaot tribe, Masai grew up in Chepkoya – a village on Mount Elgon in Kenya's Bungoma County. Over his career spanning twenty years, from 1984 to 2004, he ran mainly cross country until 1991 before switching to road running. He contested mainly races in France and Italy (under Gianni DeMadonna's management) before turning to the United States professional circuit in 2000. He was the national runner-up in cross country three times (1985, 1987, 1989). Among his road victories were the Giro al Sas (twice), Roma-Ostia Half Marathon (twice), Lyon Half Marathon (twice), the Paris Half Marathon and Indianapolis Half Marathon. He had one win over the marathon distance at the Südtirol Marathon in 1995.

He ran twice at the New York City Marathon (1991 and 1993) and at the Boston Marathon in 1992, but did not place highly. His half marathon best of 60:42 was achieved at the Stramilano race in 1993, where he was runner-up, where his marathon best of 2:11:01 hours was achieved in third place at the 1994 Paris Marathon. His sixth-place finish at the 1994 IAAF World Half Marathon Championships brought him a team gold alongside compatriots Godfrey Kiprotich and Shem Kororia. Towards the end of his career he took part in masters category races after being encouraged to do so by Shawn and Eddy Hellebuyck.

Masai had three children with his wife and with his race winnings set up a transport company and a farming business near Eldoret.

== International competitions ==
Year	Competition	Venue	Position	Event	Notes
1984	World Cross Country Championships	East Rutherford, United States	72nd	Senior race	34:52
1985	World Cross Country Championships	Lisbon, Portugal	14th	Senior race	34:06
1985	World Cross Country Championships	Lisbon, Portugal	1st	Team	pts
1985	African Cross Country Championships	Nairobi, Kenya	2nd	Senior race	36:02
1985	African Cross Country Championships	Nairobi, Kenya	1st	Team	21 pts
1986	World Cross Country Championships	Colombier, Switzerland	21st	Senior race	36:23.9
1986	World Cross Country Championships	Colombier, Switzerland	1st	Team	45 pts
1987	World Cross Country Championships	Warsaw, Poland	6th	Senior race	37:01
1987	World Cross Country Championships	Warsaw, Poland	1st	Team	53 pts
1989	World Cross Country Championships	Stavanger, Norway	7th	Senior race	40:32
1989	World Cross Country Championships	Stavanger, Norway	1st	Team	44 pts
1991	World Cross Country Championships	Antwerp, Belgium	34th	Senior race	35:06
1991	World Cross Country Championships	Antwerp, Belgium	1st	Team	38 pts
1994	World Half Marathon Championships	Oslo, Norway	6th	Half marathon	1:01:19
1994	World Half Marathon Championships	Oslo, Norway	1st	Team	3:03:36

== National titles ==
- Kenyan Cross Country Championships
  - Long course: 1991

== Circuit wins ==
- Südtirol Marathon: 1995
- Roma-Ostia Half Marathon: 1992, 1993
- Lyon Half Marathon: 1994, 1995
- Paris Half Marathon: 1996
- Indianapolis Half Marathon: 1996
- Diecimiglia del Garda: 1991
- Amatrice-Configno: 1994
- Giro al Sas: 1986, 1995

== Personal bests ==
- 5000 metres – 13:45.90 min (1991)
- 10,000 metres – 28:23.97 min (1991)
- 10K run – 27:43 min (1995)
- Half marathon – 60:42 min (1993)
- Marathon – 2:11:01 (1994)

Info from All-Athletics
