= Tadelesh Birra =

Ethiopian long-distance runner

Personal information
- Born: 24 April 1975 (age 50)

Sport
- Country: Ethiopia
- Sport: Long-distance running

Tadelesh Birra (born 24 April 1975) is an Ethiopian long-distance runner. In 2001, she competed in the women's marathon at the 2001 World Championships in Athletics held in Edmonton, Alberta, Canada. She finished in 31st place.

She won the women's race at the Hannover Marathon in Hannover, Germany both in 2003 and in 2004. In 2009, she won the inaugural edition of the Amman Marathon held in Amman, Jordan.
