= Juma Mnyampanda =

Tanzanian long-distance runner

Personal information
- Nationality: Tanzanian
- Born: 17 November 1967 (age 58)

Sport
- Sport: Long-distance running
- Event: 5000 metres
Medal record
Men's athletics
Representing Tanzania
World U20 Championships
Silver medal – second place	1986 Athens	10,000 m
Silver medal – second place	1986 Athens	20 km
African Cross Country Championships
Bronze medal – third place	1985 Nairobi	Senior team
East and Central African Championships
Bronze medal – third place	1989 Arusha	5000 m
Gold medal – first place	1990 Jinja	10,000 m
Silver medal – second place	1990 Jinja	5000 m

Juma Mnyampanda (born 17 November 1967) is a Tanzanian long-distance runner. He competed in the men's 5000 metres at the 1988 Summer Olympics.

== Career ==
Mnyampanda achieved his first international podium at the 1985 African Cross Country Championships, placing as the 14th scorer in the senior 12 km race to help Tanzania win the bronze medal.

The following year at the inaugural World Athletics U20 Championships, Mnyampanda won silver medals in both the 10,000 m and since-discontinued 20 km run, along with a fifth-place finish in the 5000 m. He qualified for his first senior global championship at the 1987 World Championships in Athletics, where he placed 12th in his 5000 m heat and did not advance.

At the 1988 Summer Olympics, Mnyampanda was seeded in the 3rd 5000 m heat. He ran 14:05.09 to finish 15th and did not qualify for the finals.

In August 1989, Mnyampanda finished runner-up at the Stockholmsloppet half-marathon.

He participated in the 1989 and 1990 East and Central African Championships, winning bronze in the 1989 5000 m, silver in the 1990 5000 m, and gold in the 1990 10,000 m.

Mnyampanda won three Tanzanian Athletics Championships national titles, including the 10,000 m title in 1988 and the 5000 m and 10,000 m titles in 1990.

In March 1991, Mnyampanda won the Roma-Ostia Half Marathon in a time of 1:02:34.

Mnaympanda qualified for both the 1991 and 1992 World Cross Country Championships senior races, finishing 124th and 148th respectively. The Tanzanian team didn't have enough members to score as a team in 1991, and due to Andrew Sambu's did-not-finish result in 1992 the Tazanian team also could not be scored.

The 1992 Boston Marathon served as the Olympic qualifying race for Tanzanian athletes, and Mnyampanda was considered a top contender along with three other athletes. Mnyampanda finished as the 2nd Tanzanian behind Juma Ikangaa, however his time and place of 2:16:49 for 18th was not fast enough to make the 1992 Tanzanian Olympic team.

At the 1994 Stockholm Marathon, Mnyampanda was in runner-up position on the homestretch, but he was out-run by Anders Szalkai before the finish and ultimately placed 3rd, winning US$4,200 of prize money.
