= Stephan Freigang =

German long-distance runner

Personal information
- Born: 27 September 1967 (age 58) Hohenleipisch, Brandenburg, East Germany

Sport
- Sport: Marathon running
Medal record
Representing Germany
Olympic Games
| Bronze medal – third place | 1992 Barcelona | Marathon |
Summer Universiade
| Gold medal – first place | 1991 Sheffield | 10,000 m |

Stephan Timo Freigang (born 27 September 1967) is a former long-distance runner from Germany, who won the bronze medal in the men's marathon at the 1992 Summer Olympics in Barcelona, Spain. He also competed for his native country at the 1996 Summer Olympics in Atlanta, Georgia. He was a three-time participant at the World Championships in Athletics (1991, 1993 and 1995).

== Life and sports ==
As a youth, Freigang ran long-distance races. As a 16-year-old he took part in 15 km runs. In 1986, he was fourth at the World Junior Championships in the 10,000 meter run and in the 20 km run. He ran his first marathon in 1987 with a time of 2 hours 14 min. 34 sec. He sporting career was in question in 1989 after a bad motorcycle accident, but in 1990 he was once again one of the top German runners and took place in the September sporting event in Berlin and recorded a time of 28:05 in the 10,000, a result that was the best by a German that year. He won the Berlin Half Marathon in 1990 and 1992.

At the 1992 Olympic games he planned to run the 10,000 meters, but he failed to qualify for the German team in that event. But with a marathon time of 2 hours 12 minutes in Palermo, December 1991, he was still able to join the Olympic team. The marathon at the games came to a dramatic end. He reached the stadium in third place, but was overtaken by Takeyuji Nakayama of Japan. Even so, he was able to overtake Nakayama to take the bronze.

After his Olympic medal he had no further important results in international competitions. Freigang represented first LC Cottbus and trained with Dieter Bittermann. In 2002, he represented SC DHfK Leipzig and has trained under Karl-Heinz Baumbach and Dr. Thomas Prochnow. In 2005, he retired from sport. During his career, he was 1.76 meters tall and weighed 65 kilograms.

== International competitions ==
| Year | Competition | Venue | Position | Event | Notes |
Representing East Germany
| 1986 | World Junior Championships | Athens, Greece | 4th | 10,000m | 29:53.52 |
| 1986 | World Junior Championships | Athens, Greece | 4th | 20 km road run | 1:04:52 |
Representing Germany
| 1992 | Olympic Games | Barcelona, Spain | 3rd | Marathon | 2:14:00 |
| 1994 | European Championships | Helsinki, Finland | 10th | 10,000m | 28:15.98 |
| 1996 | Olympic Games | Atlanta, Georgia, U.S. | — | Marathon | DNF |
| 1998 | European Championships | Budapest, Hungary | 24th | Marathon | 2:17:24 |

== Marathons ==
| Year | Competition | Venue | Position | Notes |
|---|---|---|---|---|
| 1987 | Budapest Marathon | Budapest, Hungary | 1st | 2:14:34 |
| 1988 | Fukuoka Marathon | Fukuoka, Japan | 8th | 2:12:28 |
| 1990 | Berlin Marathon | Berlin, Germany | 4th | 2:09:45 |
| 1991 | Palermo Marathon | Palermo, Italy | 1st | 2:12:00 |
| 1993 | Frankfurt Marathon | Frankfurt, Germany | 1st | 2:11:53 |
| 1995 | Tokyo Marathon | Tokyo, Japan | 2nd | 2:10:12 |
| 1997 | Cologne Marathon | Cologne, Germany | 1st | 2:11:58 |
| 1998 | Frankfurt Marathon | Frankfurt, Germany | 1st | 2:12:58 |
| 1998 | Hanover Marathon | Hanover, Germany | 1st | 2:12:16 |
| 1999 | Hanover Marathon | Hanover, Germany | 1st | 2:13:48 |
| 2001 | Leipzig Marathon | Leipzig, Germany | 1st | 2:15:57 |
| 2001 | Lisbon Marathon | Lisbon, Portugal | 1st | 2:14:27 |
| 2002 | Leipzig Marathon | Leipzig, Germany | 2nd | 2:20:11 |

Sporting positions
| Preceded by Stanisław Cembrzyński | Men's Leipzig Marathon winner 2001 | Succeeded by Carsten Eich |
