= Thabiso Moqhali =

Mosotho marathon runner (born 1967)

Medal record

Representing Lesotho

Men's athletics

Commonwealth Games
Gold medal – first place	Kuala Lumpur 1998	Marathon

Thabiso Paul Moqhali (born 7 December 1967) is a retired male marathon runner from Lesotho. He won the gold medal at the 1998 Commonwealth Games held in Kuala Lumpur in a time of 2:19:15 hours, the slowest winning time since 1966. In addition he finished 16th at the 2000 Summer Olympics.

== Achievements ==
- All results regarding marathon, unless stated otherwise

Year	Competition	Venue	Position	Event	Notes
Representing Lesotho
1986	World Junior Championships	Athens, Greece	22nd (h)	5000m	14:27.62
1986	World Junior Championships	Athens, Greece	23rd	20 km road run	1:20:57
1986	Commonwealth Games	Auckland, New Zealand	22nd (h)	1500 m	3:52.31
1986	Commonwealth Games	Auckland, New Zealand	14th	5000 m	14:48.91
1990	Commonwealth Games	Auckland, New Zealand	10th	Marathon	2:17:33
1992	Olympic Games	Barcelona, Spain	33rd	Marathon	2:19:28
1998	Commonwealth Games	Kuala Lumpur, Malaysia	1st	Marathon	2:19:15
2000	Belgrade Marathon	Belgrade, Yugoslavia	1st	Marathon	2:15:08
2000	Olympic Games	Sydney, Australia	16th	Marathon	2:16:43
2001	World Championships	Edmonton, Canada	30th	Marathon	2:25:44
