= Sergia Martínez =

Personal information
- Born: 9 September 1960 (age 65)

Sport
- Sport: Athletics
- Event: 3000 metres
Medal record
Representing Cuba
Central American and Caribbean Games
Gold medal – first place	1982 Havana	3000m
Silver medal – second place	1982 Havana	1500m
Silver medal – second place	1986 Santiago	3000m

Sergia Felicia Martínez Ravelo (born 9 September 1960) is a retired Cuban middle- and long-distance runner who specialised in the 3000 metres. She won multiple medals at regional level.

== International competitions ==
Year	Competition	Venue	Position	Event	Notes
Representing Cuba
1978	Central American and Caribbean; Junior Championships	Xalapa, Mexico	5th	800 m	2:29.2
1978	Central American and Caribbean; Junior Championships	Xalapa, Mexico	1st	1500 m	4:50.1
1979	Central American and Caribbean Championships	Guadalajara, Mexico	2nd	1500 m	4:41.2
1981	Central American and Caribbean Championships	Santo Domingo, Dominican Republic	1st	1500 m	4:26.72
1981	Central American and Caribbean Championships	Santo Domingo, Dominican Republic	1st	3000 m	9:47.26
1981	Universiade	Bucharest, Romania	14th	1500 m	4:34.18
1982	Central American and Caribbean Games	Havana, Cuba	2nd	1500 m	4:26.69
1982	Central American and Caribbean Games	Havana, Cuba	1st	3000 m	9:37.32
1983	Central American and Caribbean Championships	Havana, Cuba	1st	3000 m	9:36.75
1985	Central American and Caribbean Championships	Nassau, Bahamas	3rd	3000 m	9:47.90
1986	Central American and Caribbean Games	Santiago, Dominican Republic	2nd	3000 m	9:36.84
1986	Ibero-American Championships	Havana, Cuba	5th	3000 m	9:44.29
1995	Pan American Games	Mar del Plata, Argentina	4th	Marathon	2:47:21
1995	Central American and Caribbean Championships	Guatemala City, Guatemala	3rd	Half marathon	1:20:41

== Personal bests ==
Outdoor

- 1500 metres – 4:23.70 (Bucharest 1981)
- Marathon – 2:42:41 (Madrid 2000)
