= Lusapho April =

South African long-distance runner

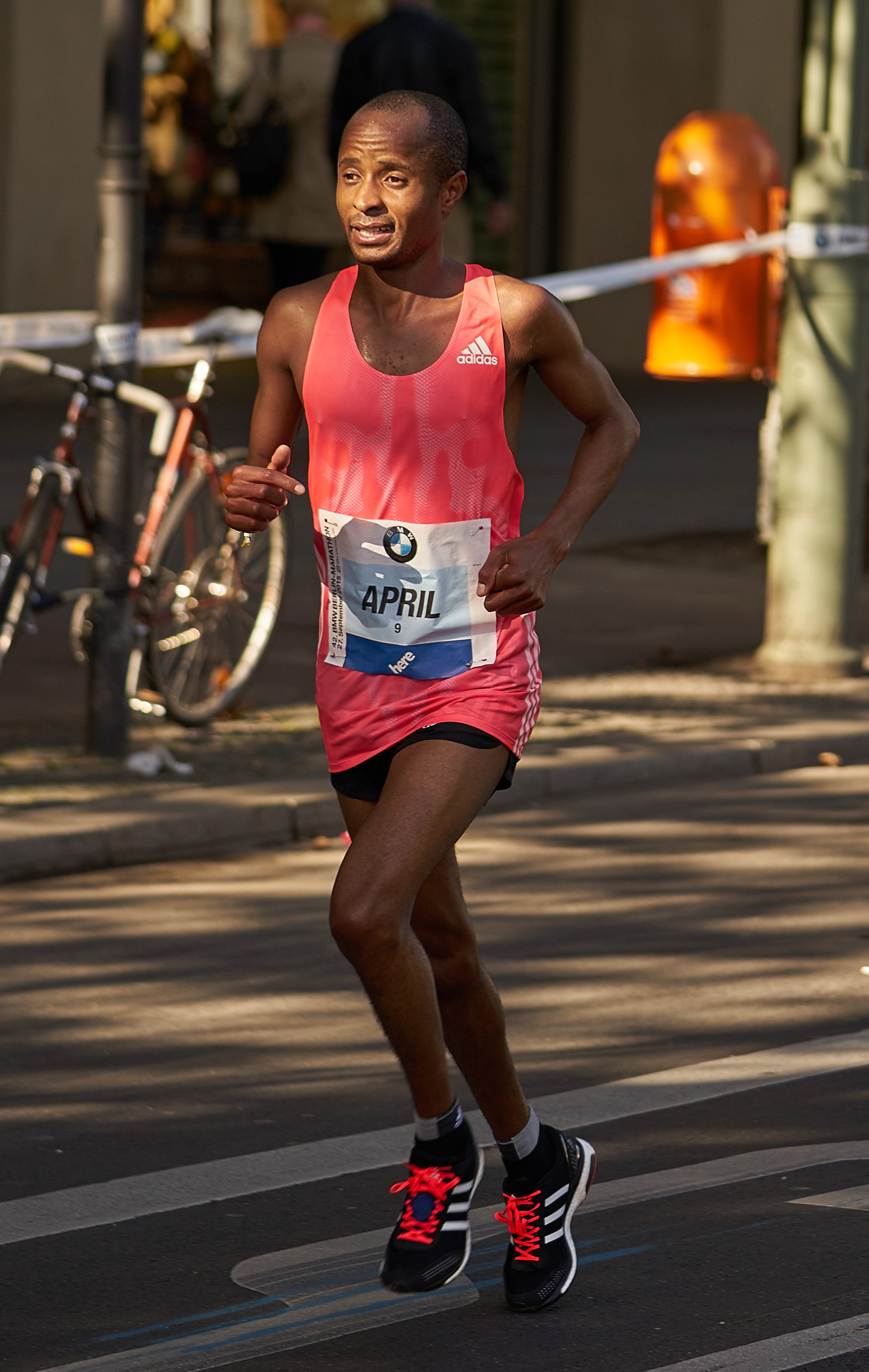
- April in the marathon in Berlin, 2015

Personal information
- Born: 24 May 1982 (age 44)
- Height: 1.72 m (5 ft 7 1/2 in)
- Weight: 50 kg (110 lb)

Sport
- Country: South Africa
- Sport: Athletics
- Event: Marathon

Lusapho Lesly April (born 24 May 1982) is a South African long-distance runner. He was born in Uitenhage. He competed in the marathon at the 2012 Summer Olympics in London, but managed only 43rd place after falling mid-race.

He set a national record in 25 km road running (1:15:02) in 2010. He is a two-time winner at the Two Oceans Half Marathon. He set a course record at the 2013 Hannover Marathon, winning in a personal best time of 2:08:32 hours. He was the third-place finisher at the 2013 New York City Marathon.

He competed in the men's marathon at the 2016 Summer Olympics in Rio de Janeiro. He finished in 24th place with a time of 2:15:24.
