= Brynhild Synstnes =

Norwegian long-distance runner

Brynhild Synstnes (born 20 April 1971) is a retired Norwegian long-distance runner who specialized in 3000/5000 metres and later marathon. She represented Lillehammer IF and SK Vidar during her heyday.

== Biography ==
She finished eighth at the 1990 World Junior Championships and thirteenth at the 1994 European Championships. In addition she was on the Norwegian team who won the silver medal at the 1994 IAAF World Half Marathon Championships, having finished seventh in the individual race. She competed again at the 1995 IAAF World Half Marathon Championships, but only finished 49th. The same year she competed in 5000 metres at the World Championships without reaching the final. She became Norwegian champion in 10,000 metres in 1995, in half marathon in 2001 and in marathon in 2001

== Personal bests ==
- 3000 metres – 8:58.75 min (1994) – sixth among Norwegian 3000 m runners.
- 5000 metres – 15:32.31 min (1995) – sixth among Norwegian 5000 m runners.
- 10,000 metres – 32:28:38 min (1995) – fifth among Norwegian 10,000 m runners.
- Half marathon – 1:10:29 hrs (1994) – fifth among Norwegian half marathon runners.
- Marathon – 2:38:22 hrs (2001) – eleventh among Norwegian marathon runners.
