= Athletics at the 1995 Pan American Games – Women's marathon =

Women's marathon at the Pan American Games

The women's marathon event at the 1995 Pan American Games was held in Mar del Plata on 25 March.

== Results ==
| Rank | Name | Nationality | Time | Notes |
|---|---|---|---|---|
| 1st place, gold medalist(s) | María Trujillo | United States | 2:43:56 | |
| 2nd place, silver medalist(s) | Jennifer Martin | United States | 2:44:10 | |
| 3rd place, bronze medalist(s) | Emma Cabrera | Mexico | 2:46:36 | |
| 4 | Sergia Martínez | Cuba | 2:47:21 | |
| 5 | Maribel Durruty | Cuba | 2:50:25 | |
| 6 | Lucía Rendón | Mexico | 2:55:18 | |
| 7 | María Teresa Aguerre | Argentina | 2:57:03 | |
| 8 | Nélida Olivet | Argentina | 2:58:17 | |
| 9 | Connie de Chang | Paraguay | 3:42:32 | |
| | Norma Quevedo | Argentina | DNF | |
| | Martha Tenorio | Ecuador | DNF | |
| | Florinda Camayo | Peru | DNS | |
