= Hannover Marathon =

Road running event in Hannover, Germany

- Date: April
- Location: Hannover, Germany
- Event type: Road
- Distance: Marathon, Half marathon, 10K run
- Primary sponsor: Hannover Airport
- Established: 1991
- Course records: Men's: 2:06:05 (2024) (Germany) Amanal Petros; Women's: 2:23:50 (2024) (Germany) Domenika Mayer
- Website: Hannover Marathon
- Participants: 2,130 finishers (2022); 2,222 (2019)

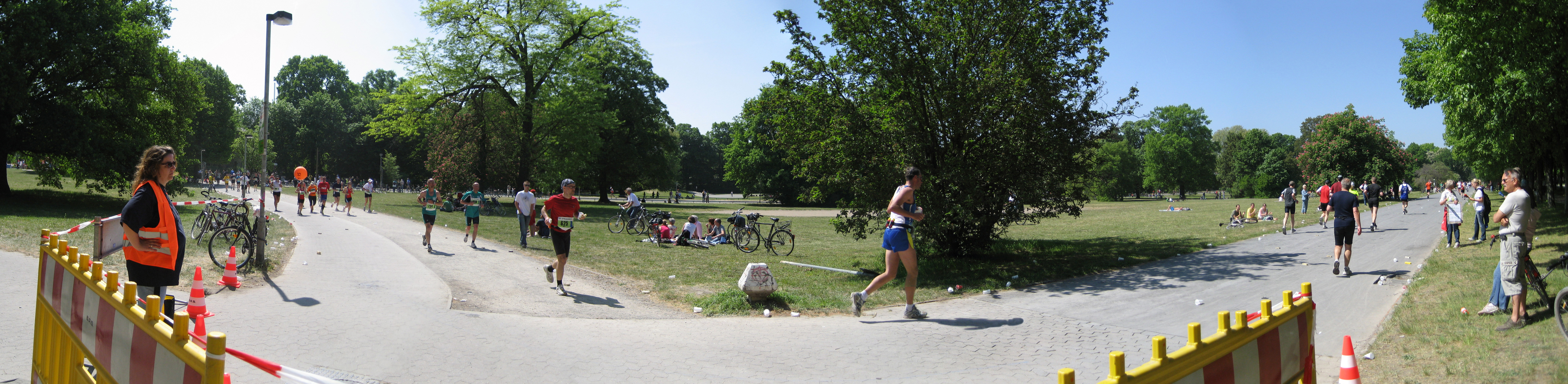
Fun runners participating in the 2007 race

The Hannover Marathon is an annual road running event featuring races over the marathon, half marathon and 10 km distance that is held in May in the city of Hannover, Germany. Over 15,000 people took part in the day's races at the 2011 edition of the event. The half marathon attracts the highest number of entries from the public (over 5000) while the marathon race typically features up to 2000 runners annually.

The marathon race holds IAAF Silver Label status and it is part of the German Road Races group. The race is officially known as the HAJ Hannover Marathon, as Hannover Airport is the current title sponsor. Previous race names include the Energie Hannover Marathon (1999 to 2001) and the Spielbanken Niedersachsen Marathon (2002 to 2007).

The marathon has elite level participants and German, East African and Eastern European runners have been the most successful in this category. The course records were both broken in 2013: South Africa's Lusapho April has the men's best of 2:08:32 hours while Olena Burkovska holds the women's record of 2:27:07 hours. Natalia Galushko has won the race the most times, with three straight wins from 1995 to 1997, while Stephan Freigang and Andrey Gordayev are the most successful male runners, having both had two back-to-back wins.

The 2020 and 2021 editions of the race were cancelled due to the COVID-19 pandemic.

== Winners ==
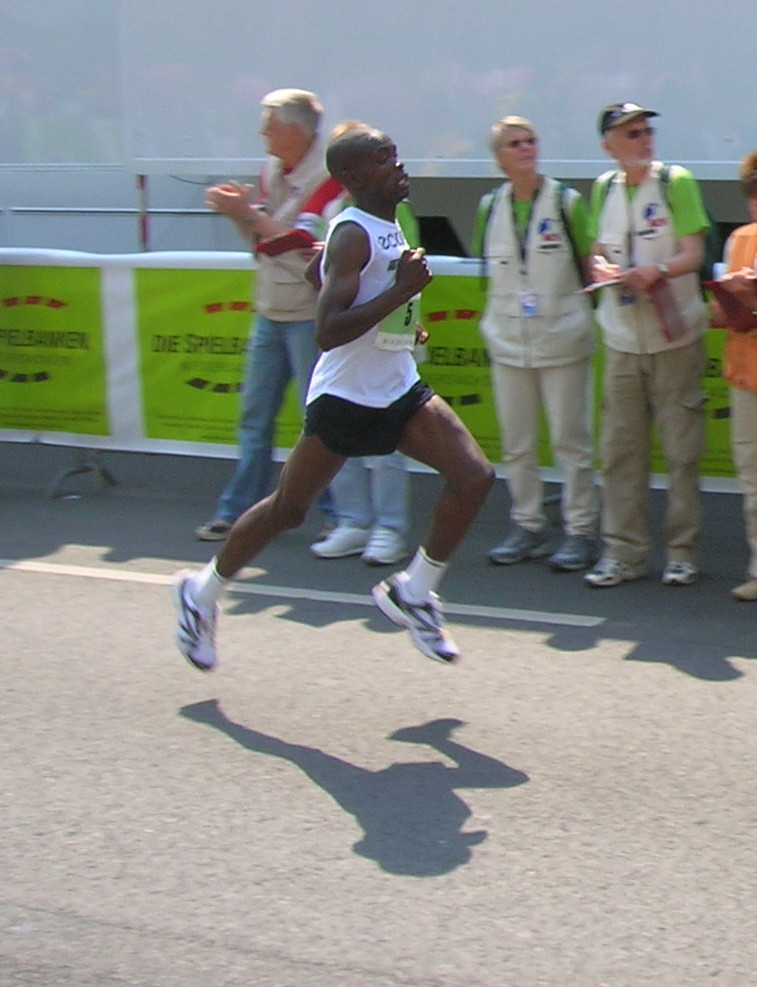
David Kiptanui Chepkwony en route to his victory in 2006

Key: Course record

Edition	Year	Men's winner	Time (h:m:s)	Women's winner	Time (h:m:s)
1st	1991	Marek Adamski (POL)	2:15:04	Elena Yegorova (URS)	2:36:29
2nd	1992	Sergey Sokov (BLR)	2:13:03	Birgit Jerschabek (GER)	2:31:42
3rd	1993	Kurt Stenzel (GER)	2:13:25	Birgit Jerschabek (GER)	2:30:34
4th	1994	Simon Qamunga (TAN)	2:14:48	Suzana Ćirić (YUG)	2:33:00
5th	1995	Rainer Wachenbrunner (GER)	2:14:41	Natalya Galushko (BLR)	2:35:13
6th	1996	Khristo Stefanov (BUL)	2:12:45	Natalya Galushko (BLR)	2:38:02
7th	1997	Česlovas Kundrotas (LTU)	2:13:40	Natalya Galushko (BLR)	2:33:24
8th	1998	Stephan Freigang (GER)	2:12:16	Volha Yudenkova (BLR)	2:32:53
9th	1999	Stephan Freigang (GER)	2:13:48	Claudia Dreher (GER)	2:27:55
10th	2000	Waldemar Glinka (POL)	2:12:55	Birgit Behrend (GER)	2:54:30
11th	2001	Andrey Gordayev (BLR)	2:11:44	Anja Carlsohn (GER)	2:37:29
12th	2002	Andrey Gordayev (BLR)	2:11:57	Ines Cronjäger (GER)	2:42:50
13th	2003	David Simukwo (KEN)	2:15:27	Tadelesh Birra (ETH)	2:33:42
14th	2004	Moses Kimutai (KEN)	2:12:28	Tadelesh Birra (ETH)	2:37:32
15th	2005	Simon Lopuyet (KEN)	2:15:36	Evelyne Kimuria (KEN)	2:48:21
16th	2006	David Chepkwony (KEN)	2:14:13	Keneli Chala (ETH)	2:47:43
17th	2007	Daniel Mbogo (KEN)	2:14:46	Monica Muthoni (KEN)	2:46:19
18th	2008	Duncan Koech (KEN)	2:14:29	Petra Oberli (SUI)	2:52:01
19th	2009	Evans Kipkosgei Ruto (KEN)	2:10:48	Fridah Lodepa (KEN)	2:35:48
20th	2010	Yusuf Songoka (KEN)	2:08:55	Yekatarina Stetsenko (UKR)	2:31:37
21st	2011	Lusapho April (RSA)	2:09:25	Georgina Rono (KEN)	2:31:19
22nd	2012	Joseph Kiptum (KEN)	2:09:56	Nataliya Puchkova (RUS)	2:30:17
23rd	2013	Lusapho April (RSA)	2:08:32	Olena Burkovska (UKR)	2:27:07
24th	2014	Henry Chirchir (KEN)	2:11:30	Souad Aït Salem (ALG)	2:33:09
25th	2015	Jacob Cheshari (KEN)	2:09:32	Souad Aït Salem (ALG)	2:27:21
26th	2016	Lusapho April (RSA)	2:11:27	Anna Hahner (GER)	2:30:35
27th	2017	Allan Kiprono (KEN)	2:09:52	Fate Tola (GER)	2:27:48
28th	2018	Seboka Negusse (ETH)	2:09:44	Agnes Kiprop (KEN)	2:32:35
29th	2019	Silas Mwetich (KEN)	2:09:37	Racheal Mutgaa (KEN)	2:26:15
—	—	cancelled in 2020 and 2021 due to the COVID-19 pandemic			
30th	2022	Hendrik Pfeiffer (GER)	2:10:59	Domenika Mayer (GER)	2:26:50
31st	2023	Amanal Petros (GER)	2:07:02	Matea Parlov Koštro (CRO)	2:25:45
32nd	2024	Amanal Petros (GER)	2:06:05	Domenika Mayer (GER)	2:23:50
33rd	2025	Samuel Fitwi (GER)	2:06:29	Domenika Mayer (GER)	2:24:22
34th	2026	Maru Kibet (KEN)	2:07:53	Domenika Mayer (GER)	2:21:26

=== Multiple wins ===
Men's
Athlete	Wins	Years
Lusapho April (RSA)	3	2011, 2013, 2016
Stephan Freigang (GER)	2	1998, 1999
Andrey Gordayev (BLR)	2	2001, 2002
Amanal Petros (GER)	2	2023, 2024

Women's
Athlete	Wins	Years
Domenika Mayer (GER)	4	2022, 2024, 2025, 2026
Natalya Galushko (BLR)	3	1995, 1996, 1997
Birgit Jerschabek (GER)	2	1992, 1993
Tadelesh Birra (ETH)	2	2003, 2004
Souad Aït Salem (ALG)	2	2014, 2015

=== By country ===
Country	Total	Men's	Women's
Kenya	20	17	6
Germany	20	8	12
Belarus	7	3	4
Ethiopia	4	1	3
South Africa	3	3	0
Poland	2	2	0
Russia	2	0	2
Ukraine	2	0	2
Algeria	2	0	2
Bulgaria	1	1	0
Croatia	1	0	1
Lithuania	1	1	0
Serbia	1	0	1
Switzerland	1	0	1
Tanzania	1	1	0
