= 1986 World Junior Championships in Athletics – Men's 5000 metres =

The men's 5000 metres event at the 1986 World Junior Championships in Athletics was held in Athens, Greece, at Olympic Stadium on 17 and 19 July.

== Medalists ==
Gold	Peter Chumba; Kenya
Silver	Alejandro Gómez; Spain
Bronze	Melese Feissa; Ethiopia

== Results ==
=== Final ===
19 July

Rank	Name	Nationality	Time	Notes
1st place, gold medalist(s)	Peter Chumba	Kenya	13:55.25	
2nd place, silver medalist(s)	Alejandro Gómez	Spain	13:55.94	
3rd place, bronze medalist(s)	Melese Feissa	Ethiopia	13:56.45	
4	Brahim Boutayeb	Morocco	13:57.48	
5	Juma Mnyampanda	Tanzania	13:57.49	
6	Debebe Demisse	Ethiopia	13:59.51	
7	Anacleto Jiménez	Spain	14:00.36	
8	Aboukar Adani	Somalia	14:00.46	
9	Eric Mastalir	United States	14:01.40	
10	John Nuttall	United Kingdom	14:08.68	
11	Greg Andersen	Canada	14:09.51	
12	Darren Mead	United Kingdom	14:12.35	
13	Giuliano Baccani	Italy	14:15.84	
14	Peter Rono	Kenya	14:20.03	
15	Harry Green	United States	14:28.08	
16	Anthony Ford	Australia	14:34.09	
17	Kazumi Ikeda	Japan	14:34.28	
18	Christoph Blum	West Germany	14:34.50	

=== Heats ===
17 July

==== Heat 1 ====
Rank	Name	Nationality	Time	Notes
1	Debebe Demisse	Ethiopia	13:59.52	Q
2	Brahim Boutayeb	Morocco	14:01.44	Q
3	Eric Mastalir	United States	14:02.05	Q
4	Peter Rono	Kenya	14:06.42	Q
5	Anacleto Jiménez	Spain	14:06.58	Q
6	John Nuttall	United Kingdom	14:09.79	Q
7	Greg Andersen	Canada	14:15.38	q
8	Christoph Blum	West Germany	14:20.12	q
9	Keita Fujino	Japan	14:22.31	
10	Athanásios Zalavras	Greece	14:35.27	
11	Edward Nabunone	Indonesia	14:41.84	
12	Ignacio Fragoso	Mexico	14:53.01	
13	Ibrahim Kabir	Nigeria	14:58.14	
14	Jan Jonsson	Sweden	15:06.14	
15	Isaac Simelane	Swaziland	15:16.39	
16	Gofetamang Rabasoto	Botswana	15:49.00	
17	Jamal Ali Al-Hakim	North Yemen	15:54.89	
18	Ndaona Musuma	Malawi	16:04.79	

==== Heat 2 ====
Rank	Name	Nationality	Time	Notes
1	Peter Chumba	Kenya	14:11.30	Q
2	Melese Feissa	Ethiopia	14:11.83	Q
3	Juma Mnyampanda	Tanzania	14:12.42	Q
4	Aboukar Adani	Somalia	14:13.18	Q
5	Giuliano Baccani	Italy	14:15.43	Q
6	Alejandro Gómez	Spain	14:15.99	Q
7	Kazumi Ikeda	Japan	14:17.34	q
8	Harry Green	United States	14:17.88	q
9	Darren Mead	United Kingdom	14:18.62	q
10	Anthony Ford	Australia	14:19.25	q
11	Nourredine Kamoun	Tunisia	14:24.49	
12	Kamal Bouhaloufa	France	14:27.61	
13	Thabiso Moqhali	Lesotho	14:27.62	
14	Herder Vázquez	Colombia	15:00.35	
15	Guy Schultz	Canada	15:12.99	
16	Joaquim Figueirêdo	Portugal	15:17.85	
17	Houssein Djama	Djibouti	15:20.31	
18	Fady Khoury	Lebanon	16:14.17	
19	Neville Walcott	Guyana	16:40.60	

== Participation ==
According to an unofficial count, 37 athletes from 30 countries participated in the event.

- Australia (1)
- Botswana (1)
- Canada (2)
- Colombia (1)
- Djibouti (1)
- Ethiopia (2)
- France (1)
- Greece (1)
- Guyana (1)
- Indonesia (1)
- Italy (1)
- Japan (2)
- Kenya (2)
- Lebanon (1)
- Lesotho (1)
- Malawi (1)
- Mexico (1)
- Morocco (1)
- Nigeria (1)
- North Yemen (1)
- Portugal (1)
- Somalia (1)
- Spain (2)
- Swaziland (1)
- Sweden (1)
- Tanzania (1)
- Tunisia (1)
- United Kingdom (2)
- United States (2)
- West Germany (1)
