= Amman Marathon =

- Date: October of each year
- Location: Amman, Jordan
- Event type: Road
- Distance: Marathon, Half marathon
- Primary sponsor: Bromine
- Established: 2009
- Course records: Men's: 2:16:31 (2018) (Kenya) Raymond Chemungor; Women's: 2:40:23 (2012) (Ethiopia) Zeineba Hasso
- Website: www.runjordan.com/amman-marathon?mnuId=24
- Participants: 1,477 (2019)

Amman International Marathon is an annually held marathon in Amman, Jordan. Organized by the NGO Run Jordan, which also organizes several other marathons across the Kingdom, it was inaugurated in 2009 by King Abdullah. The marathon has routes that are 42, 21, and 10 kilometers long, and holds a separate event for children. Around 20,000 people participate every year.

== Results ==
Key: Course record

Edition	Year	Men's Winner	Time (h:m:s)	Women's Winner	Time (h:m:s)
1st	2009	David Busienei (KEN)	2:20:48	Tadelesh Birra (ETH)	2:51:39
2nd	2010	Benjamin Serem (KEN)	2:17:05	Alemnesh Eshetu (ETH)	2:43:52
3rd	2011	Julius Maisei (KEN)	2:21:16	Sentayehu Getachew (ETH)	2:47:33
4th	2012	Mohammed Nuri (ETH)	2:19:39	Zeineba Hasso (ETH)	2:40:23
5th	2013	Tewodros Zewdu (ETH)	2:20:13	Mihret Anamo (ETH)	3:14:09
6th	2014	Methkal Abu Drais (JOR)	2:26:08	Sarah Kerubo (KEN)	2:44:41
7th	2015	Ayele Tariku (ETH)	2:18:01	Sarah Kerubo (KEN)	2:46:51
8th	2016	Benjamin Serem (KEN)	2:18:15	Yeshumie Ayalew (ETH)	2:47:10
9th	2017	Mohamed Teman (ETH)	2:17:39	Zehara Kedir (ETH)	2:46:37
10th	2018	Raymond Chemungor (KEN)	2:16:31	Leah Kiprono (KEN)	2:44:59
11th	2019	Benjamin Serem (KEN)	2:18:24	Alemi Degefa (ETH)	2:44:25
12th	2022	Ahmad Muhaisen (JOR)	2:40:07	Solène George (FRA)	3:26:31
13th	2024	Huthaifa Ahmad (JOR)	2:29:42	Careen Cheptoeck (KEN)	2:51:59

Huthaifa Alakkawi
