= 1986 World Junior Championships in Athletics – Men's 10,000 metres =

The men's 10,000 metres event at the 1986 World Junior Championships in Athletics was held in Athens, Greece, at Olympic Stadium on 16 July.

== Medalists ==
Gold	Peter Chumba; Kenya
Silver	Juma Mnyampanda; Tanzania
Bronze	Debebe Demisse; Ethiopia

== Results ==
=== Final ===
16 July

Rank	Name	Nationality	Time	Notes
1st place, gold medalist(s)	Peter Chumba	Kenya	28:44.00	
2nd place, silver medalist(s)	Juma Mnyampanda	Tanzania	28:45.14	
3rd place, bronze medalist(s)	Debebe Demisse	Ethiopia	28:49.09	
4	Stephan Freigang	East Germany	29:53.52	
5	Ararse Fuffa	Ethiopia	29:54.91	
6	Gino Van Geyte	Belgium	30:04.41	
7	Thomas Paskus	United States	30:08.49	
8	Akira Nakamura	Japan	30:10.61	
9	Johnstone Kipkoech	Kenya	30:19.14	
10	Stephen Spiers	Australia	30:19.16	
11	Masaki Yamamoto	Japan	30:28.27	
12	Zoltán Káldy	Hungary	30:34.59	
13	Valery Chesak	Soviet Union	30:38.23	
14	Oleg Bandura	Soviet Union	30:39.11	
15	Neal Gassman	United States	30:46.96	
16	João Lopes	Portugal	30:47.99	
17	Sándor Barcza	Hungary	31:06.08	
18	Alejandro Aros	Chile	31:12.04	
19	Tommi Liljedahl	Finland	31:27.29	
20	José Sobral	Portugal	31:50.56	
21	Francisco Gómez	Mexico	32:04.37	
22	Tom Bessai	Canada	32:24.75	

== Participation ==
According to an unofficial count, 22 athletes from 15 countries participated in the event.

- Australia (1)
- Belgium (1)
- Canada (1)
- Chile (1)
- East Germany (1)
- Ethiopia (2)
- Finland (1)
- Hungary (2)
- Japan (2)
- Kenya (2)
- Mexico (1)
- Portugal (2)
- Soviet Union (2)
- Tanzania (1)
- United States (2)
