= Godfrey Kiprotich =

Kenyan long-distance runner

Medal record

Men's athletics

Representing Kenya

IAAF World Half Marathon Championships
Gold medal – first place	1994 Oslo	Team

Godfrey Chirchir Kiprotich (born 23 November 1964) is a Kenyan former long-distance runner who specialised in road running. He was a team gold medallist at the IAAF World Half Marathon Championships in 1994, placing fourth to lead a team including Shem Kororia and Andrew Masai to victory.

== Career ==
Kiprotich grew up running barefoot and attended St. Patrick's High School – a school renowned for producing successful distance runners. He began competing professionally in 1991. Among his first outings outside of Kenya was in the one hour run in La Flèche, France. His distance of 20,620 m in that time was the third best ever recorded by an athlete within the Commonwealth. He following this with runs of 27:47.94 minutes for the 10,000 metres at the Adriaan Paulen Memorial then 13:33.13 minutes to finish runner-up in the Palio della Quercia 5000 metres. He marked a transition into road running in September that year, coming sixth at the Le Lion Half Marathon.

He competed on the American summer circuit of road races in 1992 and placed in the top three at the Cascade Run Off, Peachtree Road Race, Utica Boilermaker and Bix 7 Road Race. He also won the Parkersburg Half Marathon in a personal best time of 62:34 minutes. The following year he was third at the Hastings Half Marathon and Humarathon, but a return to the United States was less successful. Further half marathon wins in Parkersburg and Orlando, Florida saw him selected for Kenya for the 1994 IAAF World Half Marathon Championships. He achieved a lifetime best of 61:01 minutes, which although it did not quite bring him a medal, the in fourth-place finish led a Kenyan team of Shem Kororia and Andrew Masai to the team title. At the end of that year he was runner-up at the Arturo Barrios Invitational and third at the Tulsa Run.

He did well in the half marathon in 1995, coming fourth at the Humarathon with a time of 61:17 minutes and taking a third career win in Parkersburg, but was out of the top three at other races. In the late 1990s he was regularly in the top five of top level American road races, but failed to win any such races. Kiprotich trained with fellow Kenyan Evans Rutto and served as his pacemaker at a number of marathons, including the 2003 Chicago Marathon, which Rutto won. His final years in the early 2000s saw him pace at the Chicago Marathon, New York City Marathon, the Los Angeles Marathon, Country Music Marathon and the Dubai Marathon. He did manage to finish the distance on one occasion, recording a modest time of 2:23:58 at the 1999 Rotterdam Marathon.

== International competitions ==
Year	Competition	Venue	Position	Event	Notes
1994	World Half Marathon Championships	Oslo, Norway	4th	Half marathon	1:01:01
1994	World Half Marathon Championships	Oslo, Norway	1st	Team	3:03:36

== Personal bests ==
- 5000 metres – 13:33.13 (1991)
- 10,000 metres – 27:47.94 (1991)
- One hour run – 20,620 metres (1991)
- 10K run – 28:00 min (1998)
- Half marathon – 1:01:01 (1994)
- Marathon – 2:23:58 (1999)

Info from All-Athletics
