= Athletics at the 1998 Commonwealth Games – Men's marathon =

Men's marathon at the Commonwealth Games

The men's marathon event at the 1998 Commonwealth Games was held on 20 September in Kuala Lumpur.

== Results ==
Rank	Name	Nationality	Time	Notes
1st place, gold medalist(s)	Thabiso Moqhali	Lesotho	2:19:15	
2nd place, silver medalist(s)	Simon Mrashani	Tanzania	2:19:42	
3rd place, bronze medalist(s)	Andea Geway Suja	Tanzania	2:19:50	
4	David Taylor	England	2:20:30	
5	Frank Pooe	South Africa	2:21:12	
6	Julius Kimutai	Kenya	2:21:57	
7	Patrick Carroll	Australia	2:22:14	
8	Thabiso Ralekhetla	Lesotho	2:22:47	
9	Mpakeletsa Sephali	Lesotho	2:22:57	
10	Keith Anderson	England	2:23:07	
11	Sean Quilty	Australia	2:24:43	
12	Elphas Ginindza	Swaziland	2:24:53	
13	John Mwathiwa	Malawi	2:25:27	
14	Benson Muriuki	Kenya	2:26:22	
15	Dale Rixon	Wales	2:26:50	
16	Mluleki Nobanda	South Africa	2:28:47	
17	Steve Brace	Wales	2:29:21	
18	Phil Costley	New Zealand	2:29:39	
19	Joseph Tjitunga	Namibia	2:30:30	
20	Benedict Ballantyne	Saint Vincent and the Grenadines	2:30:44	
21	William Burns	England	2:31:16	
22	Hugh Marsden	Falkland Islands	2:48:54	
	Nicodemus Ongeri	Kenya	DNF	
	David Cavers	Scotland	DNF	
	Simon Mphulanyane	South Africa	DNF	
	Francis Munthali	Malawi	DNS	
