= Olena Burkovska =

Ukrainian long-distance runner

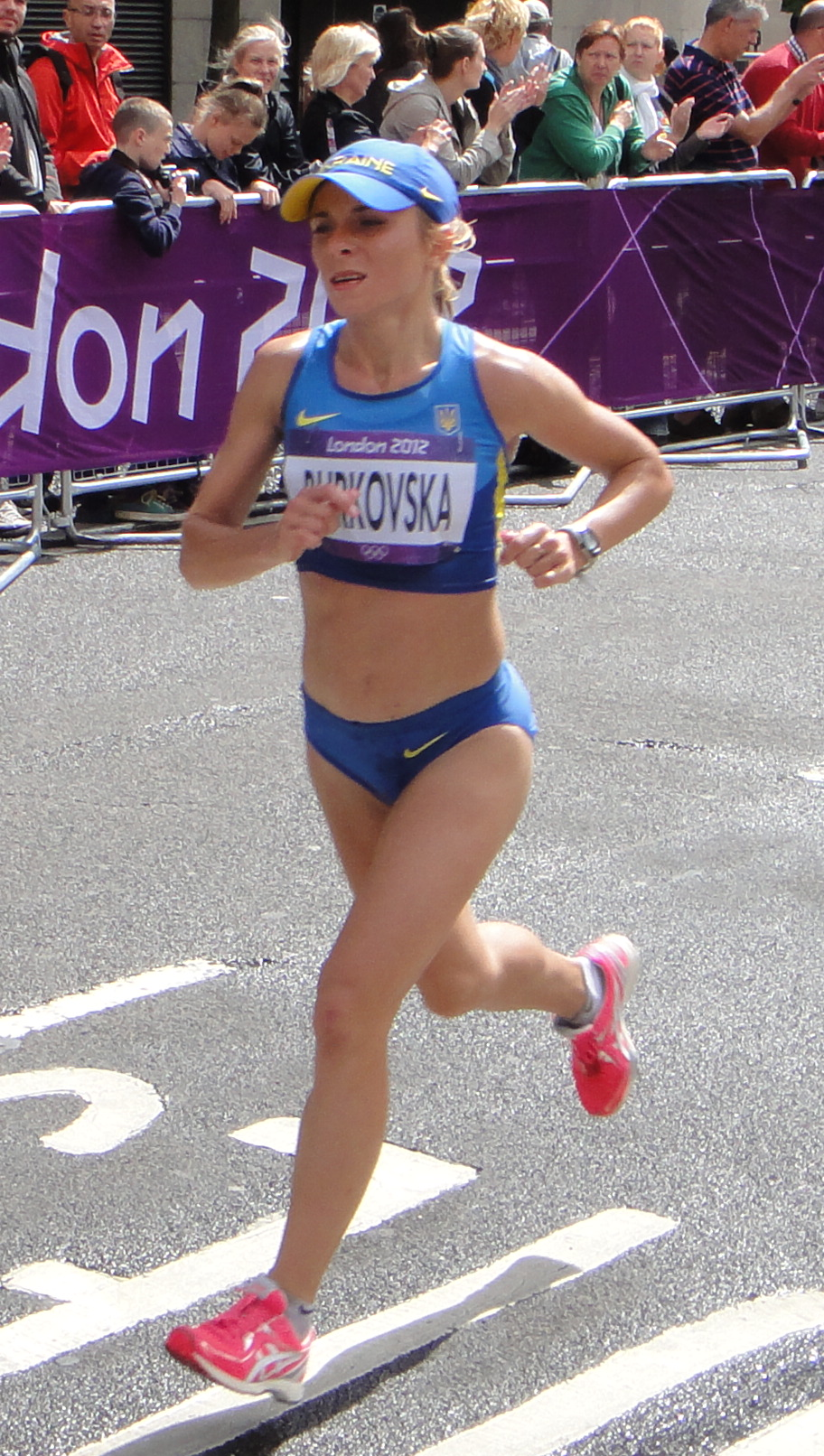
- Olena Burkovska at London 2012 Olympics

Personal information
- Born: 9 August 1981 (age 44)
- Height: 1.58 m (5 ft 2 in)
- Weight: 50 kg (110 lb)

Sport
- Country: Ukraine
- Sport: Athletics
- Event: Marathon

Olena Burkovska (Ukrainian: Олена Бурковська; born on 9 August 1981 in Yahotyn, Kyiv Region) is a Ukrainian long-distance runner who competes in marathons.

She won the 86th Košice Peace Marathon on her debut over the distance. She broke the course record setting the time 2:30:50. Burkovska's performance sliced 38 seconds from the 2:31:28 record set by Czech Alena Peterkova in 1989. At the 2010 Nagano Olympic Commemorative Marathon she finished second behind Lisa Jane Weightman, recording a time of 2:31:53.

She placed fifth at the 2010 Berlin Marathon and managed 21st place at the 2011 World Championships in Athletics. Burkovska finished 48th at the 2012 London Olympics. She broke the course record at the Hannover Marathon in 2013, completing the distance in 2:27:07 hours. On 16 November 2014, Burkovska came third at the Istanbul Marathon in 2:31:32 hours.
