= Emma Cabrera =

Mexican long-distance runner

Personal information
- Born: 5 May 1964 (age 62) Mineral del Chico, Mexico

Sport
- Sport: Track and field
Medal record
Representing Mexico
Pan American Games
Bronze medal – third place	1995 Mar del Plata	Marathon
Central American and Caribbean Games
Gold medal – first place	1993 Ponce	Marathon
Gold medal – first place	1998 Maracaibo	Marathon
Central American and Caribbean Championships
Gold medal – first place	1995 Guatemala City	Half marathon

Emma Cabrera Palafox (born 5 May 1964) is a Mexican former long-distance runner who competed mainly in marathon. She was a two-time champion at the Central American and Caribbean Games and once at the Central American and Caribbean Championships in Athletics. She was a bronze medallist at the 1995 Pan American Games. Her personal best was 2:35:43 hours.

== Career ==
Born in Carboneras near Mineral del Chico, Cabrera had her first sub-three hour marathon in 1991, finishing the Houston Marathon in 2:53:54 hours. Her international career flourished that decade, starting with a gold medal at the 1993 Central American and Caribbean Games in a games record time of 2:42:29 hours. Her global debut followed at the 1994 IAAF World Half Marathon Championships, where she was 60th overall. She ran her marathon best that year – 2:35:43 hours for runner-up at the Monterrey Marathon.

Her highest level medal came at the 1995 Pan American Games in Mar del Plata, where she was the bronze medallist in the marathon. She won two further regional titles in the 1990s: she topped the half marathon podium at the 1995 Central American and Caribbean Championships in Athletics before defending her regional marathon crown at the 1998 Central American and Caribbean Games.

Cabrera was the 1996 winner of the Marine Corps Marathon in a time of 2:48:34 hours, becoming only the second non-American woman to win the race. Among other circuit wins were the Mexico City Marathon in 1994, and three career wins at both the Ciudad de Merida Marathon and the Trabajadores Marathon in Mexico City. She won one national title, coming first in the 10,000 metres at the Mexican Athletics Championships in 1997.

After her career peak, she continued to compete into her fifties and in 2014 completed her 100th half marathon.

== International competitions ==
Year	Competition	Venue	Position	Event	Notes
1993	Central American and Caribbean Games	Ponce, Puerto Rico	1st	Marathon	2:42:29
1994	World Half Marathon Championships	Oslo, Norway	60th	Half marathon	1:15:14
1995	Central American and Caribbean Championships	Guatemala City, Guatemala	1st	Half marathon	1:17:13
1995	Pan American Games	Mar del Plata, Argentina	3rd	Marathon	2:46:36
1996	Marine Corps Marathon	Washington, D.C., United States	1st	Marathon	2:48:34
1998	Central American and Caribbean Games	Maracaibo, Venezuela	1st	Marathon	2:57:49
