= Simon Qamunga =

Tanzanian long-distance runner

Simon Qamunga (born November 20, 1967) is a Tanzanian long-distance runner who represented his country in the 1996 Summer Olympics in Atlanta, Georgia. He competed in the men's marathon event, placing 92nd. He would go on to coach running in Arusha after retirement.

In 1994 he won the Hannover Marathon in Germany with a time of 2:14:48.

== Achievements ==
Year	Competition	Venue	Position	Notes
Representing Tanzania
1994	Hannover Marathon	Hannover, Germany	1st	2:14:48
1996	Olympic Games	Atlanta, United States	92nd	2:33:11
