= Walter Konrad =

German long-distance runner

Personal information
- Full name: Walter Josef Konrad
- Nationality: German
- Born: 4 July 1928 Merano, Kingdom of Italy

Sport
- Sport: Long-distance running
- Event: 10,000 metres

Walter Konrad (born 4 July 1928) is a German long-distance runner. He competed in the men's 10,000 metres at the 1956 Summer Olympics.
