= Hoche Yaya Aden =

Djiboutian middle-distance runner

Hoche Yaya Aden (Somali: Xoosh Yaxye Aadan) (born 1 August 1967) is a Djiboutian middle-distance runner.

He was educated in the Islamic Koranic school in the district of 7, where he was also enrolled at night in a public school located in the popular district of 7bis.

After finishing at the Koranic school in the 1980s he continued in this private school learning French.

Aden came 8th place for the men's 20 km in the World Junior Championships 1986.

Aden competed for his country at the 1988 Summer Olympics held in Seoul, South Korea alongside five other runners and one sailor. He entered the 1500 metres where he came 12th in his heat meaning he did not qualify for the next round.
