= Kaptama =

- Location within Kenya
- Coordinates: 0.88°N 34.77°E
- Country: Kenya
- County: Bungoma County
- Time zone: UTC+3 (EAT)
- Climate: Cfb

Kaptama is a city in Kenya's Bungoma County.
