= Werner Dössegger =

Swiss long-distance runner (born 1938)

Personal information
- Nationality: Swiss
- Born: 18 February 1938 (age 88)

Sport
- Sport: Long-distance running
- Event: 10,000 metres

Werner Dössegger (born 18 February 1938) is a Swiss long-distance runner. He competed in the men's 10,000 metres at the 1972 Summer Olympics.
