= Talal Omar Abdillahi =

Djiboutian long-distance runner (born 1967)

Personal information
- Born: 12 May 1967 (age 59)
- Occupation: Djiboutian long-distance athlete

Sport
- Sport: long-distance running
Medal record
Men's athletics
Representing Djibouti
Francophone Games
Bronze medal – third place	1994 Bondoufle	Marathon
African Cross Country Championships
Silver medal – second place	1985 Nairobi	U20 team

Talal Omar Abdillahi (Arabic: طلال عمر عبد الله; born 12 May 1967) is a Djiboutian long-distance athlete.

At the 1985 African Cross Country Championships, Abdillahi led his Djiboutian U20 team to a silver medal by placing 5th as the top non-Kenyan finisher.

Abdillahi won the bronze medal in the marathon at the 1994 Francophone Games, finishing as the top East African in the race and running 2:25:27 hours.

Abdillahi qualified for two Summer Olympics. At the 1988 Summer Olympics, he finished 18th in his heat in the 10,000 metres and didn't qualify for the final. Four years later, he qualified in the marathon at the 1992 Summer Olympics but he did not finish the course.

As a junior he participated internationally at the 1986 IAAF World Cross Country Championships and 1986 World Junior Championships in Athletics. He also participated at the 1993 World Championships in Athletics, 1994 IAAF World Half Marathon Championships, and 1995 World Championships in Athletics.
