= Nazirdin Akylbekov =

Kyrgyzstani long-distance runner

Personal information
- Nationality: Kyrgyzstani
- Born: 14 July 1966 (age 59)

Sport
- Sport: Long-distance running
- Event: Marathon

Nazirdin Akylbekov (born 14 July 1966) is a Kyrgyzstani former long-distance runner. He competed in the men's marathon at the 1996 Summer Olympics and the 2000 Summer Olympics.
