= Natalya Galushko =

Belarusian long-distance runner

Personal information
- Nationality: Belarusian
- Born: 18 September 1971 (age 54)

Sport
- Sport: Long-distance running
- Event: Marathon

Natalya Galushko (born 18 September 1971) is a Belarusian long-distance runner. She finished in 50th place in the women's marathon at the 1996 Summer Olympics in a time of 2:44:21. She is a three-time women's champion of the Hannover Marathon (1995-97) and won at the Istanbul Marathon in 1998 as well as the Leipzig Marathon in 2002.
