= 1993 IAAF World Cross Country Championships – Junior women's race =

Junior women's race at the 1993 IAAF World Cross Country Championships
- Organisers: IAAF
- Edition: 21st
- Date: March 28
- Host city: Amorebieta, Euskadi, Spain
- Venue: Jaureguibarría Course
- Events: 1
- Distances: 4.45 km – Junior women
- Participation: 119 athletes from 32 nations

The Junior women's race at the 1993 IAAF World Cross Country Championships was held in Amorebieta, Spain, at the Jaureguibarría Course on March 28, 1993. A report on the event was given in The New York Times and in the Herald.

Complete results, medallists, and the results of British athletes were published.

== Race results ==
=== Junior women's race (4.45 km) ===
==== Individual ====
Rank	Athlete	Country	Time
1st place, gold medalist(s)	Gladys Ondeyo	Kenya	14:04
2nd place, silver medalist(s)	Pamela Chepchumba	Kenya	14:09
3rd place, bronze medalist(s)	Sally Barsosio	Kenya	14:11
4	Helen Kimutai	Kenya	14:14
5	Susie Power	Australia	14:18
6	Catherine Kirui	Kenya	14:29
7	Elena Cosoveanu	Romania	14:32
8	Akiko Kato	Japan	14:34
9	Azumi Miyazaki	Japan	14:36
10	Sachiko Nakahito	Japan	14:40
11	Gabriela Szabo	Romania	14:45
12	Alemitu Bekele	Ethiopia	14:46
13	Askale Bereda	Ethiopia	14:47
14	Yuko Kubota	Japan	14:52
15	Annemari Sandell	Finland	14:52
16	Yoshiko Imura	Japan	14:54
17	Yeshi Gebreselassie	Ethiopia	14:56
18	Marta Domínguez	Spain	15:02
19	Getenesh Tamirat	Ethiopia	15:03
20	Oksana Zhelezniak	Russia	15:03
21	Sevilya Khemeyeva	Russia	15:07
22	Rocío Martínez	Spain	15:09
23	Ana Dias	Portugal	15:14
24	Annie Troussard	France	15:15
25	Chiemi Takahashi	Japan	15:16
26	Janeth Caizalitín	Ecuador	15:16
27	Katrin Engelen	Germany	15:16
28	Leila Aman	Ethiopia	15:17
29	Sharon Murphy	United Kingdom	15:18
30	Sandra Lotter	South Africa	15:18
31	Maren Östringer	Germany	15:21
32	Louisa Leballo	South Africa	15:21
33	Nicola Slater	United Kingdom	15:22
34	Constanze Effler	Germany	15:23
35	Nadezhda Ilyina	Russia	15:24
36	Stephanie van Graan	South Africa	15:25
37	Denisa Costescu	Romania	15:26
38	Beatriz Ros	Spain	15:27
39	Amy Skieresz	United States	15:28
40	Mioara Cosuleanu	Romania	15:28
41	Helga Rauch	Italy	15:29
42	Karina Szymanska	Poland	15:30
43	Mary Jane Richards	Canada	15:31
44	Rkia Yajjou	France	15:32
45	María Abel	Spain	15:34
46	Heather Hollis	United States	15:35
47	Isabelle Sluysmans	Belgium	15:35
48	Audrey Fourie	South Africa	15:36
49	Elena Tital	Romania	15:37
50	Julie Mackay	United Kingdom	15:39
51	Nuria Fernández	Spain	15:41
52	Claire O'Connor	United Kingdom	15:41
53	Michelle Matthews	United Kingdom	15:42
54	Lauren Hunter	South Africa	15:42
55	Zsófia Szabó	Hungary	15:42
56	Sandrine Host	Belgium	15:43
57	Cécile Tricot	France	15:46
58	Birte Bultmann	Germany	15:46
59	Veronica Torres	Mexico	15:47
60	Magdalena Paszta	Poland	15:47
61	Tara Carlson	United States	15:48
62	Yelena Matveyeva	Russia	15:49
63	Molly Lori	United States	15:49
64	Katy Hollbacher	United States	15:49
65	Sara Gijsen	Belgium	15:50
66	Miriam Achote	Ecuador	15:52
67	Krestena Sullivan	Canada	15:54
68	Myriam Juveyns	Belgium	15:55
69	Jacqueline Martín	Spain	15:56
70	Patrice Kuntz	Canada	15:56
71	Simone Raupp	Germany	15:57
72	Fatiha Klilech	Morocco	15:59
73	Silvia Basso	Italy	16:00
74	Christina Amice	France	16:01
75	Szilvia Csoszánszky	Hungary	16:03
76	Jeina Mitchell	United Kingdom	16:03
77	Patrizia Ritondo	Italy	16:03
78	Brigitta Tusai	Hungary	16:06
79	Rosa Berardo	Italy	16:07
80	Angie Graham	Canada	16:10
81	Sandra Ruales	Ecuador	16:14
82	Ernestyna Kopec	Poland	16:15
83	Malika El Ali	France	16:16
84	Katarzyna Somkowska	Poland	16:16
85	Fabiane Cristine da Silva	Brazil	16:16
86	Marie Davis	United States	16:17
87	Anupama Bhoyar	India	16:19
88	Marija Gavrilova	Latvia	16:19
89	Rina Das	India	16:20
90	Mirja Moser	Switzerland	16:20
91	Thalosang Kebafitile	Botswana	16:22
92	Erika Hajto	Hungary	16:22
93	Kristin Marvin	Canada	16:23
94	Akwinder Kaur	India	16:23
95	Larisa Vetoshko	Belarus	16:26
96	Susan Nel	South Africa	16:28
97	Elisa Gabrielli	Italy	16:29
98	Christine Hofmeier	Switzerland	16:31
99	Agneta Land	Estonia	16:33
100	Carla Tavares	France	16:34
101	Karina Moncayo	Ecuador	16:35
102	Christine Taruvinga	Zimbabwe	16:36
103	Francislene da Silva	Brazil	16:36
104	Beáta Bujdosó	Hungary	16:38
105	Muriel Bagi	Belgium	16:41
106	Maria Elena Calle	Ecuador	16:42
107	Godirilemang Olerile	Botswana	16:44
108	Anna Wuttke	Poland	16:44
109	Yuliya Nikulshina	Turkmenistan	16:45
110	Maisa Tcharyeva	Turkmenistan	16:45
111	Kristine Graudina	Latvia	16:46
112	Vivian de Aguiar	Brazil	16:49
113	Sarah Thornber	Canada	16:56
114	Sylvia Kruijer	Netherlands	17:14
115	Tiziana di Crescenzo	Italy	17:15
116	Poonam Singh	India	17:17
117	Dzintra Balina	Latvia	17:38
118	Carmen Lluglla	Ecuador	18:42
119	Ana de Oliveira	Brazil	22:14

==== Teams ====
Rank	Team	Points
1st place, gold medalist(s)	Kenya: Gladys Ondeyo / 1; Pamela Chepchumba / 2; Sally Barsosio / 3; Helen Kimutai / 4; (Catherine Kirui) / (6)	10
2nd place, silver medalist(s)	Japan: Akiko Kato / 8; Azumi Miyazaki / 9; Sachiko Nakahito / 10; Yuko Kubota / 14; (Yoshiko Imura) / (16); (Chiemi Takahashi) / (25)	41
3rd place, bronze medalist(s)	Ethiopia: Alemitu Bekele / 12; Askale Bereda / 13; Yeshi Gebreselassie / 17; Getenesh Tamirat / 19; (Leila Aman) / (28)	61
4	Romania: Elena Cosoveanu / 7; Gabriela Szabo / 11; Denisa Costescu / 37; Mioara Cosuleanu / 40; (Elena Tital) / (49)	95
5	Spain: Marta Domínguez / 18; Rocío Martínez / 22; Beatriz Ros / 38; María Abel / 45; (Nuria Fernández) / (51); (Jacqueline Martín) / (69)	123
6	Russia: Oksana Zhelezniak / 20; Sevilya Khemeyeva / 21; Nadezhda Ilyina / 35; Yelena Matveyeva / 62	138
7	South Africa: Sandra Lotter / 30; Louisa Leballo / 32; Stephanie van Graan / 36; Audrey Fourie / 48; (Lauren Hunter) / (54); (Susan Nel) / (96)	146
8	Germany: Katrin Engelen / 27; Maren Östringer / 31; Constanze Effler / 34; Birte Bultmann / 58; (Simone Raupp) / (71)	150
9	United Kingdom: Sharon Murphy / 29; Nicola Slater / 33; Julie Mackay / 50; Claire O'Connor / 52; (Michelle Matthews) / (53); (Jeina Mitchell) / (76)	164
10	France: Annie Troussard / 24; Rkia Yajjou / 44; Cécile Tricot / 57; Christina Amice / 74; (Malika El Ali) / (83); (Carla Tavares) / (100)	199
11	United States: Amy Skieresz / 39; Heather Hollis / 46; Tara Carlson / 61; Molly Lori / 63; (Katy Hollbacher) / (64); (Marie Davis) / (86)	209
12	Belgium: Isabelle Sluysmans / 47; Sandrine Host / 56; Sara Gijsen / 65; Myriam Juveyns / 68; (Muriel Bagi) / (105)	236
13	Canada: Mary Jane Richards / 43; Krestena Sullivan / 67; Patrice Kuntz / 70; Angie Graham / 80; (Kristin Marvin) / (93); (Sarah Thornber) / (113)	260
14	Poland: Karina Szymanska / 42; Magdalena Paszta / 60; Ernestyna Kopec / 82; Katarzyna Somkowska / 84; (Anna Wuttke) / (108)	268
15	Italy: Helga Rauch / 41; Silvia Basso / 73; Patrizia Ritondo / 77; Rosa Berardo / 79; (Elisa Gabrielli) / (97); (Tiziana di Crescenzo) / (115)	270
16	Ecuador: Janeth Caizalitín / 26; Miriam Achote / 66; Sandra Ruales / 81; Karina Moncayo / 101; (Maria Elena Calle) / (106); (Carmen Lluglla) / (118)	274
17	Hungary: Zsófia Szabó / 55; Szilvia Csoszánszky / 75; Brigitta Tusai / 78; Erika Hajto / 92; (Beáta Bujdosó) / (104)	300
18	India: Anupama Bhoyar / 87; Rina Das / 89; Akwinder Kaur / 94; Poonam Singh / 116	386
19	Brazil: Fabiane Cristine da Silva / 85; Francislene da Silva / 103; Vivian de Aguiar / 112; Ana de Oliveira / 119	419

- Note: Athletes in parentheses did not score for the team result

== Participation ==
An unofficial count yields the participation of 119 athletes from 32 countries in the Junior women's race. This is in agreement with the official numbers as published.

- Australia (1)
- Belarus (1)
- Belgium (5)
- Botswana (2)
- Brazil (4)
- Canada (6)
- Ecuador (6)
- Estonia (1)
- Ethiopia (5)
- Finland (1)
- France (6)
- Germany (5)
- Hungary (5)
- India (4)
- Italy (6)
- Japan (6)
- Kenya (5)
- Latvia (3)
- Mexico (1)
- Morocco (1)
- Netherlands (1)
- Poland (5)
- Portugal (1)
- Romania (5)
- Russia (4)
- South Africa (6)
- Spain (6)
- Switzerland (2)
- Turkmenistan (2)
- United Kingdom (6)
- United States (6)
- Zimbabwe (1)

== See also ==
- 1993 IAAF World Cross Country Championships – Senior men's race
- 1993 IAAF World Cross Country Championships – Junior men's race
- 1993 IAAF World Cross Country Championships – Senior women's race
