= 1993 IAAF World Cross Country Championships – Senior women's race =

Senior women's race at the 1993 IAAF World Cross Country Championships
- Organisers: IAAF
- Edition: 21st
- Date: March 28
- Host city: Amorebieta, Euskadi, Spain
- Venue: Jaureguibarría Course
- Events: 1
- Distances: 6.35 km – Senior women
- Participation: 148 athletes from 38 nations

The Senior women's race at the 1993 IAAF World Cross Country Championships was held in Amorebieta, Spain, at the Jaureguibarría Course on March 28, 1993. A report on the event was given in The New York Times and in the Glasgow Herald.

Complete results, medallists, and the results of British athletes were published.

== Race results ==
=== Senior women's race (6.35 km) ===
==== Individual ====
| Rank | Athlete | Country | Time |
|---|---|---|---|
| 1st place, gold medalist(s) | Albertina Dias | Portugal | 20:00 |
| 2nd place, silver medalist(s) | Catherina McKiernan | Ireland | 20:09 |
| 3rd place, bronze medalist(s) | Lynn Jennings | United States | 20:09 |
| 4 | Zola Pieterse | South Africa | 20:10 |
| 5 | Liz McColgan | United Kingdom | 20:17 |
| 6 | Elana Meyer | South Africa | 20:18 |
| 7 | Pauline Konga | Kenya | 20:19 |
| 8 | Farida Fatès | France | 20:20 |
| 9 | Iulia Negura | Romania | 20:20 |
| 10 | Kazumi Kanbayashi | Japan | 20:23 |
| 11 | Olga Shurbanova | Russia | 20:23 |
| 12 | Hellen Kimaiyo | Kenya | 20:24 |
| 13 | Olga Bondarenko | Russia | 20:24 |
| 14 | Odile Ohier | France | 20:24 |
| 15 | Julia Vaquero | Spain | 20:28 |
| 16 | Esther Kiplagat | Kenya | 20:30 |
| 17 | Jane Ngotho | Kenya | 20:33 |
| 18 | Paula Radcliffe | United Kingdom | 20:34 |
| 19 | Merima Denboba | Ethiopia | 20:36 |
| 20 | Tsugumi Fukuyama | Japan | 20:37 |
| 21 | Annette Peters | United States | 20:37 |
| 22 | Getenesh Urge | Ethiopia | 20:39 |
| 23 | Colleen de Reuck | South Africa | 20:39 |
| 24 | Daria Nauer | Switzerland | 20:40 |
| 25 | Zahra Ouaziz | Morocco | 20:42 |
| 26 | Elena Fidatof | Romania | 20:42 |
| 27 | Yumi Osaki | Japan | 20:43 |
| 28 | Estela Estévez | Spain | 20:45 |
| 29 | Rosanna Munerotto | Italy | 20:48 |
| 30 | Yelena Kopytova | Russia | 20:50 |
| 31 | Natalya Sorokivskaya | Kazakhstan | 20:50 |
| 32 | Lydia Cheromei | Kenya | 20:57 |
| 33 | Asha Gigi | Ethiopia | 20:57 |
| 34 | Annette Palluy | France | 20:59 |
| 35 | Susan Hobson | Australia | 20:59 |
| 36 | Kumi Araki | Japan | 21:00 |
| 37 | Aki Tasaka | Japan | 21:00 |
| 38 | Vikki McPherson | United Kingdom | 21:01 |
| 39 | Conceição Ferreira | Portugal | 21:01 |
| 40 | Manuela Machado | Portugal | 21:02 |
| 41 | Cristina Misaros | Romania | 21:03 |
| 42 | Anita Håkenstad | Norway | 21:03 |
| 43 | Martha Tenorio | Ecuador | 21:05 |
| 44 | Annick Clouvel | France | 21:06 |
| 45 | Lisa Harvey | Canada | 21:09 |
| 46 | Maria Rébélo | France | 21:09 |
| 47 | Rocío Ríos | Spain | 21:11 |
| 48 | Berhane Adere | Ethiopia | 21:12 |
| 49 | Monica O'Reilly | Ireland | 21:13 |
| 50 | Helána Barócsi | Hungary | 21:13 |
| 51 | Martha Ernstdóttir | Iceland | 21:14 |
| 52 | Tatyana Pentukova | Russia | 21:14 |
| 53 | Irma Heeren | Netherlands | 21:15 |
| 54 | Véronique Collard | Belgium | 21:16 |
| 55 | Maria Guida | Italy | 21:17 |
| 56 | Anne Keenan-Buckley | Ireland | 21:18 |
| 57 | Carla Sacramento | Portugal | 21:19 |
| 58 | Carita Sunell | Finland | 21:19 |
| 59 | Marie-Hélène Reix | France | 21:19 |
| 60 | Grethe Koens | Netherlands | 21:20 |
| 61 | Harumi Suzuki | Japan | 21:20 |
| 62 | Jackie Gallagher | Australia | 21:21 |
| 63 | Suzanne Rigg | United Kingdom | 21:21 |
| 64 | Maiken Sørum | Norway | 21:22 |
| 65 | Lesley Morton | New Zealand | 21:23 |
| 66 | Nadezhda Tatarenkova | Russia | 21:24 |
| 67 | Mary O'Connor | New Zealand | 21:24 |
| 68 | Kathy Franey | United States | 21:25 |
| 69 | Roberta Brunet | Italy | 21:25 |
| 70 | Teresa Duffy | Ireland | 21:26 |
| 71 | Silvana Pereira | Brazil | 21:26 |
| 72 | Gwen Griffiths | South Africa | 21:27 |
| 73 | Valentina Tauceri | Italy | 21:27 |
| 74 | Grete Kirkeberg | Norway | 21:28 |
| 75 | Anne Marie Letko | United States | 21:28 |
| 76 | Stella Castro | Colombia | 21:29 |
| 77 | Irina Volynskaya | Kazakhstan | 21:30 |
| 78 | Raewyn O'Donnell | New Zealand | 21:30 |
| 79 | Brynhild Synstnes | Norway | 21:32 |
| 80 | Tegla Loroupe | Kenya | 21:33 |
| 81 | Rodica Moroianu | Romania | 21:34 |
| 82 | Carmen Fuentes | Spain | 21:36 |
| 83 | Carmen Brunet | Spain | 21:36 |
| 84 | Garifa Kuku | Kazakhstan | 21:37 |
| 85 | Manuela Dias | Portugal | 21:38 |
| 86 | Adanech Erkulo | Ethiopia | 21:38 |
| 87 | Breda Dennehy | Ireland | 21:39 |
| 88 | Els Peiren | Belgium | 21:39 |
| 89 | Elaine van Blunk | United States | 21:40 |
| 90 | Marjan Freriks | Netherlands | 21:40 |
| 91 | Maria Curatolo | Italy | 21:41 |
| 92 | Alison Wyeth | United Kingdom | 21:44 |
| 93 | Albertina Machado | Portugal | 21:47 |
| 94 | Lucy Smith | Canada | 21:47 |
| 95 | Isabella Moretti | Switzerland | 21:48 |
| 96 | Myriam Dumont | Belgium | 21:48 |
| 97 | Patty Blanchard | Canada | 21:49 |
| 98 | Viviany de Oliveira | Brazil | 21:51 |
| 99 | Solange de Souza | Brazil | 21:52 |
| 100 | Kathy Butler | Canada | 21:52 |
| 101 | Gwyn Coogan | United States | 21:54 |
| 102 | Éva Dóczi | Hungary | 21:56 |
| 103 | Bettina Andersen | Denmark | 21:56 |
| 104 | Hennie Zantinga | Netherlands | 21:57 |
| 105 | Anuța Cătună | Romania | 21:57 |
| 106 | Ana Isabel Alonso | Spain | 21:58 |
| 107 | Anne Hare | New Zealand | 21:59 |
| 108 | Julia Sakara | Zimbabwe | 22:01 |
| 109 | Natalya Galushko | Belarus | 22:02 |
| 110 | Andrea Whitcombe | United Kingdom | 22:05 |
| 111 | Ingrid van Giel | Belgium | 22:09 |
| 112 | Camilla Spires | South Africa | 22:11 |
| 113 | Jacqueline Mota | Canada | 22:13 |
| 114 | Rita de Jesús | Brazil | 22:18 |
| 115 | Ursula Jeitzinger | Switzerland | 22:20 |
| 116 | Sue Malaxos | Australia | 22:26 |
| 117 | Mabel Arrua | Argentina | 22:31 |
| 118 | Mónika Tóth | Hungary | 22:32 |
| 119 | Isabel Juárez | Mexico | 22:42 |
| 120 | Aparna Bhoyar | India | 22:44 |
| 121 | Susan Mahony | Australia | 22:45 |
| 122 | Lukose Leelamma | India | 22:49 |
| 123 | Márta Visnyei | Hungary | 22:52 |
| 124 | Danuta Marczyk | Poland | 22:52 |
| 125 | Wilma Rusman | Netherlands | 22:55 |
| 126 | Delight Nyambe | Zambia | 23:02 |
| 127 | Dessy Muchimba | Zambia | 23:05 |
| 128 | Eucharia Mweemba | Zambia | 23:06 |
| 129 | Linda Thyer | Canada | 23:08 |
| 130 | Anja Smolders | Belgium | 23:11 |
| 131 | Addeh Mwamba | Zambia | 23:15 |
| 132 | Celinamma Joseph | India | 23:16 |
| 133 | Lydia Mafula | South Africa | 23:16 |
| 134 | Nelly Glauser | Switzerland | 23:25 |
| 135 | Vally Satayabhama | India | 23:28 |
| 136 | Iglandini González | Colombia | 23:29 |
| 137 | Réka Csizi | Hungary | 23:32 |
| 138 | Yelena Mostovaya | Kazakhstan | 23:36 |
| 139 | Esneda Londono | Colombia | 23:53 |
| 140 | Ilona Lubane | Latvia | 24:03 |
| 141 | Alexandra Olarte | Colombia | 24:04 |
| 142 | Chiu Pik Kwan | Hong Kong | 24:06 |
| 143 | Andrea Hayoz | Switzerland | 24:07 |
| 144 | Ilona Freimane | Latvia | 24:13 |
| — | Derartu Tulu | Ethiopia | DNF |
| — | Nadia Dandolo | Italy | DNF |
| — | Ingrid Delagrange | Belgium | DNF |
| — | Maureen Harrington | Ireland | DNF |

==== Teams ====
| Rank | Team | Points |
|---|---|---|
| 1st place, gold medalist(s) | Kenya: Pauline Konga / 7; Hellen Kimaiyo / 12; Esther Kiplagat / 16; Jane Ngotho / 17; (Lydia Cheromei) / (32); (Tegla Loroupe) / (80) | 52 |
| 2nd place, silver medalist(s) | Japan: Kazumi Kanbayashi / 10; Tsugumi Fukuyama / 20; Yumi Osaki / 27; Kumi Araki / 36; (Aki Tasaka) / (37); (Harumi Suzuki) / (61) | 93 |
| 3rd place, bronze medalist(s) | France: Farida Fatès / 8; Odile Ohier / 14; Annette Palluy / 34; Annick Clouvel / 44; (Maria Rébélo) / (46); (Marie-Hélène Reix) / (59) | 100 |
| 4 | South Africa: Zola Pieterse / 4; Elana Meyer / 6; Colleen de Reuck / 23; Gwen Griffiths / 72; (Camilla Spires) / (112); (Lydia Mafula) / (133) | 105 |
| 5 | Russia: Olga Shurbanova / 11; Olga Bondarenko / 13; Yelena Kopytova / 30; Tatyana Pentukova / 52; (Nadezhda Tatarenkova) / (66) | 106 |
| 6 | Ethiopia: Merima Denboba / 19; Getenesh Urge / 22; Asha Gigi / 33; Berhane Adere / 48; (Adanech Erkulo) / (86); (Derartu Tulu) / (DNF) | 122 |
| 7 | United Kingdom: Liz McColgan / 5; Paula Radcliffe / 18; Vikki McPherson / 38; Suzanne Rigg / 63; (Alison Wyeth) / (92); (Andrea Whitcombe) / (110) | 124 |
| 8 | Portugal: Albertina Dias / 1; Conceição Ferreira / 39; Manuela Machado / 40; Carla Sacramento / 57; (Manuela Dias) / (85); (Albertina Machado) / (93) | 137 |
| 9 | Romania: Iulia Negura / 9; Elena Fidatof / 26; Cristina Misaros / 41; Rodica Moroianu / 81; (Anuța Cătună) / (105) | 157 |
| 10 | United States: Lynn Jennings / 3; Annette Peters / 21; Kathy Franey / 68; Anne Marie Letko / 75; (Elaine van Blunk) / (89); (Gwynn Coogan) / (101) | 167 |
| 11 | Spain: Julia Vaquero / 15; Estela Estévez / 28; Rocío Ríos / 47; Carmen Fuentes / 82; (Carmen Brunet) / (83); (Ana Isabel Alonso) / (106) | 172 |
| 12 | Ireland: Catherina McKiernan / 2; Monica O'Reilly / 49; Anne Keenan-Buckley / 56; Teresa Duffy / 70; (Breda Dennehy) / (87); (Maureen Harrington) / (DNF) | 177 |
| 13 | Italy: Rosanna Munerotto / 29; Maria Guida / 55; Roberta Brunet / 69; Valentina Tauceri / 73; (Maria Curatolo) / (91); (Nadia Dandolo) / (DNF) | 226 |
| 14 | Norway: Anita Håkenstad / 42; Maiken Sørum / 64; Grete Kirkeberg / 74; Brynhild Synstnes / 79 | 259 |
| 15 | Netherlands: Irma Heeren / 53; Grethe Koens / 60; Marjan Freriks / 90; Hennie Zantinga / 104; (Wilma Rusman) / (125) | 307 |
| 16 | New Zealand: Lesley Morton / 65; Mary O'Connor / 67; Raewyn O'Donnell / 78; Anne Hare / 107 | 317 |
| 17 | Kazakhstan: Natalya Sorokivskaya / 31; Irina Volynskaya / 77; Garifa Kuku / 84; Yelena Mostovaya / 138 | 330 |
| 18 | Australia: Susan Hobson / 35; Jackie Gallagher / 62; Sue Malaxos / 116; Susan Mahony / 121 | 334 |
| 19 | Canada: Lisa Harvey / 45; Lucy Smith / 94; Patty Blanchard / 97; Kathy Butler / 100; (Jacqueline Mota) / (113); (Linda Thyer) / (129) | 336 |
| 20 | Belgium: Véronique Collard / 54; Els Peiren / 88; Myriam Dumont / 96; Ingrid van Giel / 111; (Anja Smolders) / (130); (Ingrid Delagrange) / (DNF) | 349 |
| 21 | Switzerland: Daria Nauer / 24; Isabella Moretti / 95; Ursula Jeitzinger / 115; Nelly Glauser / 134; (Andrea Hayoz) / (143) | 368 |
| 22 | Brazil: Silvana Pereira / 71; Viviany de Oliveira / 98; Solange de Souza / 99; Rita de Jesús / 114 | 382 |
| 23 | Hungary: Helána Barócsi / 50; Éva Dóczi / 102; Mónika Tóth / 118; Márta Visnyei / 123; (Réka Csizi) / (137) | 393 |
| 24 | Colombia: Stella Castro / 76; Iglandini González / 136; Esneda Londono / 139; Alexandra Olarte / 141 | 492 |
| 25 | India: Aparna Bhoyar / 120; Lukose Leelamma / 122; Celinamma Joseph / 132; Vally Satayabhama / 135 | 509 |
| 26 | Zambia: Delight Nyambe / 126; Dessy Muchimba / 127; Eucharia Mweemba / 128; Addeh Mwamba / 131 | 512 |

- Note: Athletes in parentheses did not score for the team result

== Participation ==
An unofficial count yields the participation of 148 athletes from 38 countries in the Senior women's race. This is in agreement with the official numbers as published.

- Argentina (1)
- Australia (4)
- Belarus (1)
- Belgium (6)
- Brazil (4)
- Canada (6)
- Colombia (4)
- Denmark (1)
- Ecuador (1)
- Ethiopia (6)
- Finland (1)
- France (6)
- Hong Kong (1)
- Hungary (5)
- Iceland (1)
- India (4)
- Ireland (6)
- Italy (6)
- Japan (6)
- Kazakhstan (4)
- Kenya (6)
- Latvia (2)
- Mexico (1)
- Morocco (1)
- Netherlands (5)
- New Zealand (4)
- Norway (4)
- Poland (1)
- Portugal (6)
- Romania (5)
- Russia (5)
- South Africa (6)
- Spain (6)
- Switzerland (5)
- United Kingdom (6)
- United States (6)
- Zambia (4)
- Zimbabwe (1)

== See also ==
- 1993 IAAF World Cross Country Championships – Senior men's race
- 1993 IAAF World Cross Country Championships – Junior men's race
- 1993 IAAF World Cross Country Championships – Junior women's race
