= Clouvel =

Clouvel is a French surname. Notable people with the surname include:

- Élodie Clouvel (born 1989), French modern pentathlete
- Annick Clouvel (born 1963), French long-distance runner
- Pascal Clouvel (born 1960), French athlete
