= Athletics at the 1998 Asian Games – Women's 10,000 metres =

Women's 10,000 metres at the 1998 Asian Games
- Venue: Thammasat Stadium
- Dates: 14 December 1998
- Competitors: 8 from 7 nations

Medalists
gold medal	Yuko Kawakami	Japan
silver medal	Zheng Guixia	China
bronze medal	Chiemi Takahashi	Japan

The women's 10,000 metres competition at the 1998 Asian Games in Bangkok, Thailand was held on 14 December at the Thammasat Stadium.

== Schedule ==
All times are Indochina Time (UTC+07:00)

Date	Time	Event
Monday, 14 December 1998	17:00	Final

== Results ==
Rank	Athlete	Time	Notes
1st place, gold medalist(s)	Yuko Kawakami (JPN)	32:01.25	
2nd place, silver medalist(s)	Zheng Guixia (CHN)	32:18.81	
3rd place, bronze medalist(s)	Chiemi Takahashi (JPN)	32:20.68	
4	Hong Myong-hui (PRK)	32:49.57	
5	Supriyati Sutono (INA)	32:52.45	
6	Maggie Chan (HKG)	34:39.44	
7	Zainab Bakkour (SYR)	36:11.94	
8	Anna Markelowa (TKM)	39:35.43	
