= Athletics at the 2000 Summer Olympics – Women's 10,000 metres =

Women's 10,000 metres at the Games of the XXVII Olympiad
- Venue: Stadium Australia
- Date: 27 September 2000 (heats); 30 September 2000 (final)
- Competitors: 41 from 27 nations
- Winning time: 30:17.49 OR

Medalists
1st place, gold medalist(s)		Derartu Tulu; Ethiopia
2nd place, silver medalist(s)		Gete Wami; Ethiopia
3rd place, bronze medalist(s)		Fernanda Ribeiro; Portugal

The 10,000 metres at the 2000 Summer Olympics as part of the athletics programme were held at Stadium Australia on Wednesday 27 September, and Saturday 30 September 2000. The top eight runners in each of the initial two heats automatically qualified for the final. The next four fastest runners from across the heats also qualified. There were a total number of 41 participating athletes.

== Records ==
World and Olympic records prior to the Games
World Record	29:31.78	Junxia Wang	China	Beijing, China	9 September 1993
Olympic Record	31:01.63	Fernanda Ribeiro	Portugal	Atlanta, United States	2 August 1996

== Medalists ==
Gold:	Silver:	Bronze:
Derartu Tulu, Ethiopia	Gete Wami, Ethiopia	Fernanda Ribeiro, Portugal

== Results ==
All times shown are in seconds.

- Q denotes qualification by place in heat.
- q denotes qualification by overall place.
- DNS denotes did not start.
- DNF denotes did not finish.
- DQ denotes disqualification.
- NR denotes national record.
- OR denotes Olympic record.
- WR denotes world record.
- PB denotes personal best.
- SB denotes season best.

== Qualifying heats ==
Heat 1 of 2 Date: Wednesday 27 September 2000
Place		Athlete	Nation	Lane	Time	Qual.	Record
Heat	Overall	Athlete	Nation	Lane	Time	Qual.	Record
1	1	Derartu Tulu	Ethiopia	11	32:06.19	Q	
2	2	Tegla Loroupe	Kenya	22	32:06.41	Q	
3	3	Fernanda Ribeiro	Portugal	7	32:06.43	Q	
4	4	Olivera Jevtic	FR Yugoslavia	12	32:06.54	Q	
5	5	Harumi Hiroyama	Japan	16	32:07.68	Q	
6	6	Li Ji	China	12	32:28.96	Q	
7	7	Sonia O'Sullivan	Ireland	9	32:29.93	Q	
8	8	Jeļena Prokopčuka	Latvia	18	32:32.87	Q	
9	18	Lyudmila Biktasheva	Russia	5	32:52.00	q	
10	19	Asmae Leghzaoui	Morocco	17	32:56.63	q	
11	21	Restituta Joseph	Tanzania	6	33:12.18		
12	23	Anikó Kálovics	Hungary	2	33:20.40		
13	25	Petra Wassiluk	Germany	19	33:23.03		
14	27	Maria Teresa Recio	Spain	1	33:36.44		
15	29	Clair Fearnley	Australia	20	33:47.23		
16	32	Jen Rhines	United States	21	34:08.28		
17	33	Natalie Harvey	Australia	4	34:12.90		
18	35	Nora Leticia Rocha	Mexico	10	34:37.84		
19	37	Tina Connelly	Canada	8	34:46.04		
20	40	Nasria Baghdad	Algeria	15	35:31.53		
		Hrisostomia Iakovou	Greece	14	DNS		
		Marleen Renders	Belgium	3	DNS		

Heat 2 of 2 Date: Wednesday 27 September 2000
Place		Athlete	Nation	Lane	Time	Qual.	Record
Heat	Overall	Athlete	Nation	Lane	Time	Qual.	Record
1	9	Sally Barsosio	Kenya	19	32:34.07	Q	
2	10	Alice Timbilil	Kenya	21	32:34.15	Q	
3	11	Berhane Adere	Ethiopia	4	32:34.62	Q	
4	12	Gete Wami	Ethiopia	17	32:34.63	Q	
5	13	Chiemi Takahashi	Japan	18	32:34.70	Q	
6	14	Paula Radcliffe	Great Britain	6	32:34:73	Q	
7	15	Elana Meyer	South Africa	14	32:35.32	Q	
8	16	Yuko Kawakami	Japan	10	32:36.60	Q	
9	17	Lidiya Grigoryeva	Russia	20	32:44.43	q	
10	20	Libbie Hickman	United States	22	32:59.28	q	
11	22	Breda Dennehy-Willis	Ireland	8	33:17.45		
12	24	Ana Dias	Portugal	13	33:21.69		
13	26	Silvia Sommaggio	Italy	9	33:24.13		
14	28	Fatima Yvelain	France	5	33:44.48		
15	30	María Abel	Spain	3	34:05.44		
16	31	Galina Bogomolova	Russia	15	34:06.21		
17	34	Kylie Risk	Australia	1	34:30.91		
18	36	Deena Drossin	United States	16	34:40.86		
19	38	Bouchra Chaabi	Morocco	11	34:49.35		
20	39	Maggie Chan Man Yee	Hong Kong	7	35:21.20		
		Gunhild Haugen	Norway	12	DNF		
		Carole Montgomery	Canada	2	DNS		

Overall Results Semi-Finals

Semi-Finals Overall Results
Place	Athlete	Nation	Heat	Lane	Place	Time	Qual.	Record
1	Derartu Tulu	Ethiopia	1	11	1	32:06.19	Q	
2	Tegla Loroupe	Kenya	1	22	2	32:06.41	Q	
3	Fernanda Ribeiro	Portugal	1	7	3	32:06.43	Q	
4	Olivera Jevtic	FR Yugoslavia	1	12	4	32:06.54	Q	
5	Harumi Hiroyama	Japan	1	16	5	32:07.68	Q	
6	Li Ji	China	1	13	6	32:28:96	Q	
7	Sonia O'Sullivan	Ireland	1	9	7	32:29.93	Q	
8	Jeļena Prokopčuka	Latvia	1	18	8	32:32.87	Q	
9	Sally Barsosio	Kenya	2	19	1	32:34.07	Q	
10	Alice Timbilil	Kenya	2	21	2	32:34.15	Q	
11	Berhane Adere	Ethiopia	2	4	3	32:34.62	Q	
12	Gete Wami	Ethiopia	2	17	4	32:34.64	Q	
13	Chiemi Takahashi	Japan	2	18	5	32:34.70	Q	
14	Paula Radcliffe	Great Britain	2	6	6	32:34.73	Q	
15	Elana Meyer	South Africa	2	14	7	32:34.73	Q	
16	Yuko Kawakami	Japan	2	10	8	32:36.60	Q	
17	Lidiya Grigoryeva	Russia	2	20	9	32:44.43	q	
18	Lyudmila Biktasheva	Russia	1	5	9	32:52.00	q	
19	Asmae Leghzaoui	Morocco	1	17	10	32:56.63	q	
20	Libbie Hickman	United States	2	22	10	32:59.28	q	
21	Restituta Joseph	Tanzania	1	6	11	33:12.18		
22	Breda Dennehy-Willis	Ireland	2	8	11	33:17.45		
23	Anikó Kálovics	Hungary	1	2	12	33:20.40		
24	Ana Dias	Portugal	2	13	12	33:21.69		
25	Petra Wassiluk	Germany	1	19	13	33:23.03		
26	Silvia Sommaggio	Italy	2	9	13	33:24.13		
27	Maria Teresa Recio	Spain	1	1	14	33:36.44		
28	Fatima Yvelain	France	2	5	14	33:44.48		
29	Clair Fearnley	Australia	1	20	15	33:47.23		
30	María Abel	Spain	2	13	12	34:05.44		
31	Galina Bogomolova	Russia	2	15	16	34:06.21		
32	Jen Rhines	United States	1	21	16	34:08.28		
33	Natalie Harvey	Australia	1	4	17	34:12.90		
34	Kylie Risk	Australia	2	1	17	34:30.19		
35	Nora Leticia Rocha	Mexico	1	10	18	34:37.84		
36	Deena Drossin	United States	2	16	18	34:40.86		
37	Tina Connelly	Canada	1	8	19	34:46.04		
38	Bouchra Chaabi	Morocco	2	11	19	34:49.35		
39	Maggie Chan Man Yee	Hong Kong	2	7	20	35:21.20		
40	Nasria Baghdad	Algeria	1	15	20	35:31.53		
	Gunhild Haugen	Norway	2	12		DNF		
	Hrisostomia Iakovou	Greece	1	14		DNS		
	Carole Montgomery	Canada	2	2		DNS		
	Marleen Renders	Belgium	1	3		DNS		

== Final ==
Final Date: Saturday 30 September 2000
Place	Athlete	Nation	Lane/Order	Time	Record
1st place, gold medalist(s)	Derartu Tulu	Ethiopia	14	30:17.49	OR
2nd place, silver medalist(s)	Gete Wami	Ethiopia	8	30:22.48	SB
3rd place, bronze medalist(s)	Fernanda Ribeiro	Portugal	9	30:22.88	NR
4	Paula Radcliffe	Great Britain	11	30:26.97	NR
5	Tegla Loroupe	Kenya	20	30:37.26	SB
6	Sonia O'Sullivan	Ireland	10	30:53.37	NR
7	Li Ji	China	13	31:06.94	PB
8	Elana Meyer	South Africa	2	31:14.70	SB
9	Lidiya Grigoryeva	Russia	8	31:21.27	PB
10	Yuko Kawakami	Japan	19	31:27.44	
11	Olivera Jevtic	FR Yugoslavia	6	31:29.65	NR
12	Berhane Adere	Ethiopia	18	31:40.52	
13	Lyudmila Biktasheva	Russia	16	31:47.10	
14	Alice Timbilil	Kenya	17	31:50.22	PB
15	Chiemi Takahashi	Japan	5	31:52.59	SB
16	Libbie Hickman	United States	7	31:56.94	SB
17	Sally Barsosio	Kenya	12	31:57.41	SB
18	Asmae Leghzaoui	Morocco	1	31:59.21	NR
19	Jeļena Prokopčuka	Latvia	4	32:17.72	
20	Harumi Hiroyama	Japan	5	32:24.17	
