= Annick Clouvel =

German long-distance runner

Personal information
- Nationality: France
- Born: Annick Michon; 15 October 1963 (age 62) Saint-Rambert-sur-Loire, France
- Height: 170 cm (5 ft 7 in)
- Weight: 55 kg (121 lb)

Sport
- Sport: Long-distance running
- Event: Marathon

Annick Clouvel (born 15 October 1963) is a French long-distance runner who specialized in the half marathon.

During her career she finished 11th at the 1991 World Women's Road Race Championships, 18th at the 1992 World Half Marathon Championships, 14th at the 1993 World Cross Country Championships, 44th at the 1993 World Cross Country Championships, 39th at the 1998 World Half Marathon Championships and did not finish at the 1999 World Half Marathon Championships. At the 1993 World Cross Country Championships, Clouvel took a bronze medal in the team event, together with Farida Fatès, Odile Ohier and Annette Palluy their respective placements adding up to 100 points.

She became French marathon champion three times; in the 10,000 metres in 1991, the half marathon in 1993 and the marathon in 1998.

She is the mother of Élodie Clouvel, a modern pentathlete who has competed in the Olympic Games, a goal Annick Clouvel herself never achieved.
