= 1993 IAAF World Cross Country Championships – Senior men's race =

Senior men's race at the 1993 IAAF World Cross Country Championships
- Organisers: IAAF
- Edition: 21st
- Date: March 28
- Host city: Amorebieta, Euskadi, Spain
- Venue: Jaureguibarría Course
- Events: 1
- Distances: 11.75 km – Senior men
- Participation: 236 athletes from 45 nations

The Senior men's race at the 1993 IAAF World Cross Country Championships was held in Amorebieta, Spain, at the Jaureguibarría Course on March 28, 1993. A report on the event was given in The New York Times and in the Herald.

Complete results, medallists, and the results of British athletes were published.

== Race results ==
=== Senior men's race (11.75 km) ===
==== Individual ====
Rank	Athlete	Country	Time
1st place, gold medalist(s)	William Sigei	Kenya	32:51
2nd place, silver medalist(s)	Dominic Kirui	Kenya	32:56
3rd place, bronze medalist(s)	Ismael Kirui	Kenya	32:59
4	Moses Tanui	Kenya	33:14
5	Ezequiel Bitok	Kenya	33:21
6	Khalid Skah	Morocco	33:22
7	Haile Gebrselassie	Ethiopia	33:23
8	Addis Abebe	Ethiopia	33:29
9	Worku Bikila	Ethiopia	33:31
10	Paul Tergat	Kenya	33:35
11	Brahim Lahlafi	Morocco	33:36
12	Domingos Castro	Portugal	33:43
13	Ondoro Osoro	Kenya	33:45
14	Martín Fiz	Spain	33:46
15	James Kariuki	Kenya	33:50
16	Fita Bayissa	Ethiopia	33:53
17	Thierry Pantel	France	33:55
18	Tendai Chimusasa	Zimbabwe	33:58
19	Abraham Assefa	Ethiopia	33:59
20	Todd Williams	United States	34:00
21	Paulo Guerra	Portugal	34:01
22	Carlos Monteiro	Portugal	34:03
23	Kidane Gebrmichael	Ethiopia	34:04
24	Mustapha Essaïd	France	34:08
25	Joaquim Pinheiro	Portugal	34:08
26	Alberto Juzdado	Spain	34:12
27	Hammou Boutayeb	Morocco	34:15
28	Fekadu Degefu	Ethiopia	34:15
29	José Carlos Adán	Spain	34:16
30	Anthony Kiprono	Kenya	34:17
31	Abdellah Béhar	France	34:17
32	Andrew Pearson	United Kingdom	34:18
33	Meshack Mogotsi	South Africa	34:18
34	Eamonn Martin	United Kingdom	34:19
35	Róbert Stefko	Slovakia	34:23
36	Patrick Kaotsane	South Africa	34:23
37	Francisco Guerra	Spain	34:25
38	Alejandro Gómez	Spain	34:27
39	Jean-Louis Prianon	France	34:28
40	Jan Pesava	Czech Republic	34:29
41	João Junqueira	Portugal	34:29
42	Nigousse Urge	Ethiopia	34:29
43	Antonio Serrano	Spain	34:29
44	Paul Patrick	Australia	34:30
45	Steve Tunstall	United Kingdom	34:34
46	Carlos Patrício	Portugal	34:35
47	Silvio Guerra	Ecuador	34:36
48	Oleg Strizhakov	Russia	34:36
49	Rod de Highden	Australia	34:37
50	Matt Giusto	United States	34:37
51	Paolo Donati	Italy	34:38
52	Abel Antón	Spain	34:38
53	Tonnie Dirks	Netherlands	34:39
54	Francesco Bennici	Italy	34:39
55	Hamid Essebani	Morocco	34:41
56	Farid Khayrullin	Russia	34:42
57	José Regalo	Portugal	34:42
58	Hideyuki Suzuki	Japan	34:43
59	Pascal Thiébaut	France	34:43
60	Ed Eyestone	United States	34:44
61	Ayele Mezegebu	Ethiopia	34:44
62	Peter O'Donoghue	Australia	34:45
63	Aleksandr Mikitenko	Kazakhstan	34:45
64	Rafael Muñoz	Mexico	34:45
65	Henk Gommer	Netherlands	34:46
66	Terry Croyle	United States	34:47
67	Whaddon Nieuwoudt	South Africa	34:50
68	Yann Millon	France	34:51
69	Andy Bristow	United Kingdom	34:54
70	Shaun Creighton	Australia	34:55
71	Jon Brown	United Kingdom	34:55
72	Antonio Silio	Argentina	34:56
73	Oscar Amaya	Argentina	34:58
74	Visa Orttenvuori	Finland	34:58
75	Fraser Bertram	Canada	34:58
76	Arnold Mächler	Switzerland	34:59
77	Mikhail Dasko	Russia	34:59
78	Luis Ibarra	Brazil	35:00
79	Antonio Pérez	Spain	35:00
80	Salah Hissou	Morocco	35:00
81	Elarbi Khattabi	Morocco	35:02
82	Klaus-Peter Hansen	Denmark	35:04
83	Maximino Ayala	Mexico	35:05
84	Winston Muzini	Zimbabwe	35:05
85	Colin Dalton	Australia	35:06
86	Aaron Ramirez	United States	35:08
87	Wayne Larden	Australia	35:09
88	Meshack Dandane	South Africa	35:09
89	Eduardo Henriques	Portugal	35:09
90	Antonio Martins	France	35:10
91	Julian Paynter	Australia	35:10
92	Jean Verster	South Africa	35:10
93	Art Boileau	Canada	35:11
94	Pat Porter	United States	35:11
95	Yoshikazu Aizawa	Japan	35:11
96	Sergey Fedotov	Russia	35:12
97	René Godlieb	Netherlands	35:12
98	Pere Arco	Spain	35:13
99	Bahadur Prasad	India	35:13
100	Hans Ulin	Belgium	35:14
101	Antonio Ibañez	Argentina	35:18
102	Paul Roden	United Kingdom	35:20
103	Vladimir Gusev	Kazakhstan	35:20
104	Shadrack Hoff	South Africa	35:22
105	Andrea Erni	Switzerland	35:23
106	Renato Gotti	Italy	35:23
107	Miloud Badine	Morocco	35:24
108	Noel Berkeley	Ireland	35:24
109	Eddy Hellebuyck	Belgium	35:25
110	Mark Coogan	United States	35:25
111	Dave Clarke	United Kingdom	35:28
112	Valdenor dos Santos	Brazil	35:29
113	Gabino Apolonio	Mexico	35:30
114	Gerry Curtis	Ireland	35:31
115	Vanderlei de Lima	Brazil	35:31
116	Rodney Higgins	Australia	35:31
117	Nikolay Chameyev	Russia	35:32
118	Robert O'Donnell	Australia	35:32
119	Jonathan Hume	United States	35:33
120	Noriaki Igarashi	Japan	35:33
121	Doug Cronkite	Canada	35:35
122	Eddy de Pauw	Belgium	35:35
123	Jacques van Rensburg	South Africa	35:36
124	Tsuyoshi Yasukawa	Japan	35:39
125	Simon Morolong	South Africa	35:41
126	Alessandro Lambruschini	Italy	35:41
127	Juan Juárez	Argentina	35:42
128	Miguel Ubaldo	Mexico	35:42
129	Geraldo Francisco de Assis	Brazil	35:45
130	Leopold Sirabahenda	Burundi	35:46
131	Jos Maes	Belgium	35:47
132	Carsten Jørgensen	Denmark	35:48
133	Darren Mead	United Kingdom	35:49
134	Yuriy Chizhov	Russia	35:49
135	Brighton Chipere	Zimbabwe	35:51
136	Noel Cullen	Ireland	35:52
137	Aart Stigter	Netherlands	35:53
138	Ronaldo da Costa	Brazil	35:53
139	Chris Weber	Canada	35:53
140	Dinesh Kumar	India	35:54
141	Ram Lal	India	35:55
142	Angel Cardenas	Chile	35:55
143	Pasi Mattila	Finland	35:55
144	Sam Molokomme	South Africa	35:56
145	Hilaire Ntirampeba	Burundi	35:57
146	Shivkumar Shreshta	India	35:58
147	Daniel Castro	Argentina	36:00
148	Richard O'Flynn	Ireland	36:02
149	Anatoliy Bychaev	Kazakhstan	36:02
150	Pasi Jeremejeff	Finland	36:03
151	Néstor Quinapanta	Ecuador	36:03
152	Jose Duarte	Mexico	36:04
153	Koji Numata	Japan	36:06
154	Marcelo Cascabelo	Argentina	36:09
155	Dov Kremer	Israel	36:10
156	Santtu Mäkinen	Finland	36:10
157	Jari Venäläinen	Finland	36:14
158	Zachariah Ditetso	Botswana	36:15
159	Michal Kucera	Czech Republic	36:15
160	Colin Dignum	Canada	36:16
161	Luc Krotwaar	Netherlands	36:17
162	Nestor Jami	Ecuador	36:18
163	Kamiel Maase	Netherlands	36:20
164	Richard Lindroos	New Zealand	36:23
165	Jesús Valdez	Mexico	36:24
166	Oscar Cortínez	Argentina	36:24
167	Aurelio Mitty	Angola	36:26
168	Dario Fegatelli	Italy	36:27
169	James Sullivan	Ireland	36:28
170	Paul Dugdale	United Kingdom	36:29
171	Kaare Sørensen	Denmark	36:31
172	Madan Singh	India	36:34
173	Hitoshi Saotome	Japan	36:39
174	Franklin Tenorio	Ecuador	36:41
175	Norman Tinkham	Canada	36:42
176	Vladimir Mayfat	Kazakhstan	36:42
177	Nestor Cevasco	Argentina	36:43
178	Eddy Punina	Ecuador	36:52
179	Gerard Kiernan	Ireland	36:55
180	Jan Korevaar	Netherlands	36:57
181	Adalberto Garcia	Brazil	36:58
182	Jukka Tammisuo	Finland	37:02
183	Luíz dos Santos	Brazil	37:06
184	Paul McCloy	Canada	37:09
185	Bruno Le Stum	France	37:15
186	Jens Wilky	Germany	37:18
187	Umberto Pusterla	Italy	37:22
188	Henno Haava	Estonia	37:22
189	Mokganedi Bobi	Botswana	37:23
190	Andre Zhulin	Kazakhstan	37:32
191	Janis Mitchoulis	Latvia	37:36
192	Danny Schuermans	Belgium	37:38
193	Redmal Singh	India	37:40
194	Kent Jensen	Denmark	37:41
195	Richard Mulligan	Ireland	37:47
196	Normunds Freimanis	Latvia	37:51
197	Henrik Hardahl	Denmark	37:53
198	Girts Fogels	Latvia	37:58
199	Zhanat Baltabayev	Kazakhstan	38:04
200	Sibangubukhosi Sibanda	Zimbabwe	38:07
201	Julio Chuqui	Ecuador	38:14
202	Michel Jean-Louis	Mauritius	38:15
203	Guntis Rozins	Latvia	38:25
204	Normunds Ivzans	Latvia	38:34
205	Robert Kusi	Botswana	38:36
206	Mohamed Al-Hada	Yemen	38:43
207	Fouad Obad	Yemen	39:00
208	Lee Kar-Lun	Hong Kong	39:18
209	Marly Sopyev	Turkmenistan	39:52
210	Juris Treimanis	Latvia	40:02
211	Prosnattam Lal	Fiji	40:39
212	Christopher Blackburn	Mauritius	40:55
213	Bineshwar Prasad	Fiji	41:16
214	Shiraaz Haroon Shah	Fiji	41:25
215	Ashok Kumar	Fiji	43:03
216	Makudi Mubenga	Zaire	44:05
217	Deepak Dalip Kumar	Fiji	44:21
—	Stefano Baldini	Italy	DNF
—	Arturo Barrios	Mexico	DNF
—	John Halvorsen	Norway	DNF
—	Vincenzo Modica	Italy	DNF
—	Vincent Rousseau	Belgium	DNF
—	Davendra Pradesh Singh	Fiji	DNF
—	Ruddy Walem	Belgium	DNF
—	Jonathan Wyatt	New Zealand	DNF
—	Antonio Rapisarda	France	DNF
—	Richard Potts	New Zealand	DNF
—	Gennadiy Temnikov	Russia	DNF
—	Richard Charette	Canada	DNF
—	Mike Felicite	Mauritius	DNF
—	Charif El Ouardi	Morocco	DNF
—	Leonardo Malgor	Argentina	DNF
—	Stephen Boyd	Canada	DNF
—	Brad Schlapak	United States	DNF
—	Mohamed Siti	Morocco	DNF
—	Yevgeniy Yeliyev	Turkmenistan	DNF

==== Teams ====
Rank	Team	Points
1st place, gold medalist(s)	Kenya: William Sigei / 1; Dominic Kirui / 2; Ismael Kirui / 3; Moses Tanui / 4; Ezequiel Bitok / 5; Paul Tergat / 10; (Ondoro Osoro) / (13); (James Kariuki) / (15); (Anthony Kiprono) / (30)	25
2nd place, silver medalist(s)	Ethiopia: Haile Gebrselassie / 7; Addis Abebe / 8; Worku Bikila / 9; Fita Bayissa / 16; Abraham Assefa / 19; Kidane Gebrmichael / 23; (Fekadu Degefu) / (28); (Nigousse Urge) / (42); (Ayele Mezegebu) / (61)	82
3rd place, bronze medalist(s)	Portugal: Domingos Castro / 12; Paulo Guerra / 21; Carlos Monteiro / 22; Joaquim Pinheiro / 25; João Junqueira / 41; Carlos Patrício / 46; (José Regalo) / (57); (Eduardo Henriques) / (89)	167
4	Spain: Martín Fiz / 14; Alberto Juzdado / 26; José Carlos Adán / 29; Francisco Guerra / 37; Alejandro Gómez / 38; Antonio Serrano / 43; (Abel Antón) / (52); (Antonio Pérez) / (79); (Pere Arco) / (98)	187
5	France: Thierry Pantel / 17; Mustapha Essaïd / 24; Abdellah Béhar / 31; Jean-Louis Prianon / 39; Pascal Thiébaut / 59; Yann Millon / 68; (Antonio Martins) / (90); (Bruno Le Stum) / (185); (Antonio Rapisarda) / (DNF)	238
6	Morocco: Khalid Skah / 6; Brahim Lahlafi / 11; Hammou Boutayeb / 27; Hamid Essebani / 55; Salah Hissou / 80; Elarbi Khattabi / 81; (Miloud Badine) / (107); (Charif El Ouardi) / (DNF); (Mohamed Siti) / (DNF)	260
7	United Kingdom: Andrew Pearson / 32; Eamonn Martin / 34; Steve Tunstall / 45; Andy Bristow / 69; Jon Brown / 71; Paul Roden / 102; (Dave Clarke) / (111); (Darren Mead) / (133); (Paul Dugdale) / (170)	353
8	United States: Todd Williams / 20; Matt Giusto / 50; Ed Eyestone / 60; Terry Croyle / 66; Aaron Ramirez / 86; Pat Porter / 94; (Mark Coogan) / (110); (Jonathan Hume) / (119); (Brad Schlapak) / (DNF)	376
9	Australia: Paul Patrick / 44; Rod de Highden / 49; Peter O'Donoghue / 62; Shaun Creighton / 70; Colin Dalton / 85; Wayne Larden / 87; (Julian Paynter) / (91); (Rodney Higgins) / (116); (Robert O'Donnell) / (118)	397
10	South Africa: Meshack Mogotsi / 33; Patrick Kaotsane / 36; Whaddon Nieuwoudt / 67; Meshack Dandane / 88; Jean Verster / 92; Shadrack Hoff / 104; (Jacques van Rensburg) / (123); (Simon Morolong) / (125); (Sam Molokomme) / (144)	420
11	Russia: Oleg Strizhakov / 48; Farid Khayrullin / 56; Mikhail Dasko / 77; Sergey Fedotov / 96; Nikolay Chameyev / 117; Yuriy Chizhov / 134; (Gennadiy Temnikov) / (DNF)	528
12	Argentina: Antonio Silio / 72; Oscar Amaya / 73; Antonio Ibañez / 101; Juan Juárez / 127; Daniel Castro / 147; Marcelo Cascabelo / 154; (Oscar Cortínez) / (166); (Nestor Cevasco) / (177); (Leonardo Malgor) / (DNF)	674
13	Netherlands: Tonnie Dirks / 53; Henk Gommer / 65; René Godlieb / 97; Aart Stigter / 137; Luc Krotwaar / 161; Kamiel Maase / 163; (Jan Korevaar) / (180)	676
14	Italy: Paolo Donati / 51; Francesco Bennici / 54; Renato Gotti / 106; Alessandro Lambruschini / 126; Dario Fegatelli / 168; Umberto Pusterla / 187; (Stefano Baldini) / (DNF); (Vincenzo Modica) / (DNF)	692
15	Mexico: Rafael Muñoz / 64; Maximino Ayala / 83; Gabino Apolonio / 113; Miguel Ubaldo / 128; Jose Duarte / 152; Jesús Valdez / 165; (Arturo Barrios) / (DNF)	705
16	Japan: Hideyuki Suzuki / 58; Yoshikazu Aizawa / 95; Noriaki Igarashi / 120; Tsuyoshi Yasukawa / 124; Koji Numata / 153; Hitoshi Saotome / 173	723
17	Brazil: Luis Ibarra / 78; Valdenor dos Santos / 112; Vanderlei de Lima / 115; Geraldo Francisco de Assis / 129; Ronaldo da Costa / 138; Adalberto Garcia / 181; (Luíz dos Santos) / (183)	753
18	Canada: Fraser Bertram / 75; Art Boileau / 93; Doug Cronkite / 121; Chris Weber / 139; Colin Dignum / 160; Norman Tinkham / 175; (Paul McCloy) / (184); (Richard Charette) / (DNF); (Stephen Boyd) / (DNF)	763
19	Ireland: Noel Berkeley / 108; Gerry Curtis / 114; Noel Cullen / 136; Richard O'Flynn / 148; James Sullivan / 169; Gerard Kiernan / 179; (Richard Mulligan) / (195)	854
20	Finland: Visa Orttenvuori / 74; Pasi Mattila / 143; Pasi Jeremejeff / 150; Santtu Mäkinen / 156; Jari Venäläinen / 157; Jukka Tammisuo / 182	862
21	Kazakhstan: Aleksandr Mikitenko / 63; Vladimir Gusev / 103; Anatoliy Bychaev / 149; Vladimir Mayfat / 176; Andre Zhulin / 190; Zhanat Baltabayev / 199	880
22	India: Bahadur Prasad / 99; Dinesh Kumar / 140; Ram Lal / 141; Shivkumar Shreshta / 146; Madan Singh / 172; Redmal Singh / 193	891
23	Ecuador: Silvio Guerra / 47; Néstor Quinapanta / 151; Nestor Jami / 162; Franklin Tenorio / 174; Eddy Punina / 178; Julio Chuqui / 201	913
24	Latvia: Janis Mitchoulis / 191; Normunds Freimanis / 196; Girts Fogels / 198; Guntis Rozins / 203; Normunds Ivzans / 204; Juris Treimanis / 210	1202
DNF	Belgium: (Hans Ulin) / (100); (Eddy Hellebuyck) / (109); (Eddy de Pauw) / (122); (Jos Maes) / (131); (Danny Schuermans) / (192); (Vincent Rousseau) / (DNF); (Ruddy Walem) / (DNF)	DNF
DNF	Fiji: (Prosnattam Lal) / (211); (Bineshwar Prasad) / (213); (Shiraaz Haroon Shah) / (214); (Ashok Kumar) / (215); (Deepak Dalip Kumar) / (217); (Davendra Pradesh Singh) / (DNF)	DNF

- Note: Athletes in parentheses did not score for the team result

== Participation ==
An unofficial count yields the participation of 236 athletes from 45 countries in the Senior men's race. This is in agreement with the official numbers as published.

- Angola (1)
- Argentina (9)
- Australia (9)
- Belgium (7)
- Botswana (3)
- Brazil (7)
- Burundi (2)
- Canada (9)
- Chile (1)
- Czech Republic (2)
- Denmark (5)
- Ecuador (6)
- Estonia (1)
- Ethiopia (9)
- Fiji (6)
- Finland (6)
- France (9)
- Germany (1)
- Hong Kong (1)
- India (6)
- Ireland (7)
- Israel (1)
- Italy (8)
- Japan (6)
- Kazakhstan (6)
- Kenya (9)
- Latvia (6)
- Mauritius (3)
- Mexico (7)
- Morocco (9)
- Netherlands (7)
- New Zealand (3)
- Norway (1)
- Portugal (8)
- Russia (7)
- Slovakia (1)
- South Africa (9)
- Spain (9)
- Switzerland (2)
- Turkmenistan (2)
- United Kingdom (9)
- United States (9)
- Yemen (2)
- Zaire (1)
- Zimbabwe (4)

== See also ==
- 1993 IAAF World Cross Country Championships – Junior men's race
- 1993 IAAF World Cross Country Championships – Senior women's race
- 1993 IAAF World Cross Country Championships – Junior women's race
