= 1993 IAAF World Cross Country Championships =

- Organisers: IAAF
- Edition: 21st
- Date: March 28
- Host city: Amorebieta, Euskadi, Spain
- Venue: Jaureguibarría Course
- Events: 4
- Distances: 11.75 km – Senior men 7.15 km – Junior men 6.35 km – Senior women 4.45 km – Junior women
- Participation: 653 athletes from 54 nations

The 1993 IAAF World Cross Country Championships was held in Amorebieta, Spain, at the Jaureguibarría Course on March 28, 1993. A report on the event was given in The New York Times and in the Herald.

Complete results for senior men, junior men, senior women, junior women, medallists, and the results of British athletes were published.

== Medallists ==
Event	Gold		Silver		Bronze	
Individual
Senior men (11.75 km)	William Sigei; Kenya	32:51	Dominic Kirui; Kenya	32:56	Ismael Kirui; Kenya	32:59
Junior men (7.15 km)	Philip Mosima; Kenya	20:18	Christopher Koskei; Kenya	20:20	Josephat Machuka; Kenya	20:23
Senior women (6.35 km)	Albertina Dias; Portugal	20:00	Catherina McKiernan; Ireland	20:09	Lynn Jennings; United States	20:09
Junior women (4.45 km)	Gladys Ondeyo; Kenya	14:04	Pamela Chepchumba; Kenya	14:09	Sally Barsosio; Kenya	14:11
Team
Senior men	Kenya	25	Ethiopia	82	Portugal	167
Junior men	Kenya	10	Ethiopia	27	Morocco	76
Senior women	Kenya	52	Japan	93	France	100
Junior women	Kenya	10	Japan	41	Ethiopia	61

== Race results ==
=== Senior men's race (11.75 km) ===
Individual race
Rank	Athlete	Country	Time
1st place, gold medalist(s)	William Sigei	Kenya	32:51
2nd place, silver medalist(s)	Dominic Kirui	Kenya	32:56
3rd place, bronze medalist(s)	Ismael Kirui	Kenya	32:59
4	Moses Tanui	Kenya	33:14
5	Ezequiel Bitok	Kenya	33:21
6	Khalid Skah	Morocco	33:22
7	Haile Gebrselassie	Ethiopia	33:23
8	Addis Abebe	Ethiopia	33:29
9	Worku Bikila	Ethiopia	33:31
10	Paul Tergat	Kenya	33:35
11	Brahim Lahlafi	Morocco	33:36
12	Domingos Castro	Portugal	33:43
Full results

Teams
Rank	Team	Points
1st place, gold medalist(s)	Kenya: William Sigei / 1; Dominic Kirui / 2; Ismael Kirui / 3; Moses Tanui / 4; Ezequiel Bitok / 5; Paul Tergat / 10; (Ondoro Osoro) / (13); (James Kariuki) / (15); (Anthony Kiprono) / (30)	25
2nd place, silver medalist(s)	Ethiopia: Haile Gebrselassie / 7; Addis Abebe / 8; Worku Bikila / 9; Fita Bayissa / 16; Abraham Assefa / 19; Kidane Gebrmichael / 23; (Fekadu Degefu) / (28); (Nigousse Urge) / (42); (Ayele Mezegebu) / (61)	82
3rd place, bronze medalist(s)	Portugal: Domingos Castro / 12; Paulo Guerra / 21; Carlos Monteiro / 22; Joaquim Pinheiro / 25; João Junqueira / 41; Carlos Patrício / 46; (José Regalo) / (57); (Eduardo Henriques) / (89)	167
4	Spain	187
5	France	238
6	Morocco	260
7	United Kingdom	353
8	United States	376
Full results

- Note: Athletes in parentheses did not score for the team result

=== Junior men's race (7.15 km) ===
Individual race
Rank	Athlete	Country	Time
1st place, gold medalist(s)	Philip Mosima	Kenya	20:18
2nd place, silver medalist(s)	Christopher Koskei	Kenya	20:20
3rd place, bronze medalist(s)	Josephat Machuka	Kenya	20:23
4	Lazarus Nyakeraka	Kenya	20:23
5	Tegenu Abebe	Ethiopia	20:28
6	Habte Jifar	Ethiopia	20:50
7	Tibebu Reta	Ethiopia	20:50
8	Stanley Kimutai	Kenya	21:03
9	Geta Tsega	Ethiopia	21:04
10	Tolosa Gebre	Ethiopia	21:05
11	Salah El Ghazi	Morocco	21:08
12	Wener Kashayev	Russia	21:09
Full results

Teams
Rank	Team	Points
1st place, gold medalist(s)	Kenya: Philip Mosima / 1; Christopher Koskei / 2; Josephat Machuka / 3; Lazarus Nyakeraka / 4; (Stanley Kimutai) / (8)	10
2nd place, silver medalist(s)	Ethiopia: Tegenu Abebe / 5; Habte Jifar / 6; Tibebu Reta / 7; Geta Tsega / 9; (Tolosa Gebre) / (10); (Tekalegne Shewaye) / (17)	27
3rd place, bronze medalist(s)	Morocco: Salah El Ghazi / 11; Hicham El Guerrouj / 15; Abdelmajid El Boubkary / 18; Driss El Himer / 32; (Mohamed El Hattab) / (41); (Irba Lakhal) / (51)	76
4	Spain	114
5	Russia	120
6	South Africa	122
7	Yemen	135
8	Japan	155
Full results

- Note: Athletes in parentheses did not score for the team result

=== Senior women's race (6.35 km) ===
Individual race
Rank	Athlete	Country	Time
1st place, gold medalist(s)	Albertina Dias	Portugal	20:00
2nd place, silver medalist(s)	Catherina McKiernan	Ireland	20:09
3rd place, bronze medalist(s)	Lynn Jennings	United States	20:09
4	Zola Pieterse	South Africa	20:10
5	Liz McColgan	United Kingdom	20:17
6	Elana Meyer	South Africa	20:18
7	Pauline Konga	Kenya	20:19
8	Farida Fatès	France	20:20
9	Iulia Negura	Romania	20:20
10	Kazumi Kanbayashi	Japan	20:23
11	Olga Shurbanova	Russia	20:23
12	Hellen Kimaiyo	Kenya	20:24
Full results

Teams
Rank	Team	Points
1st place, gold medalist(s)	Kenya: Pauline Konga / 7; Hellen Kimaiyo / 12; Esther Kiplagat / 16; Jane Ngotho / 17; (Lydia Cheromei) / (32); (Tegla Loroupe) / (80)	52
2nd place, silver medalist(s)	Japan: Kazumi Kanbayashi / 10; Tsugumi Fukuyama / 20; Yumi Osaki / 27; Kumi Araki / 36; (Aki Tasaka) / (37); (Harumi Suzuki) / (61)	93
3rd place, bronze medalist(s)	France: Farida Fatès / 8; Odile Ohier / 14; Annette Palluy / 34; Annick Clouvel / 44; (Maria Rébélo) / (46); (Marie-Hélène Reix) / (59)	100
4	South Africa	105
5	Russia	106
6	Ethiopia	122
7	United Kingdom	124
8	Portugal	137
Full results

- Note: Athletes in parentheses did not score for the team result

=== Junior women's race (4.45 km) ===
Individual race
Rank	Athlete	Country	Time
1st place, gold medalist(s)	Gladys Ondeyo	Kenya	14:04
2nd place, silver medalist(s)	Pamela Chepchumba	Kenya	14:09
3rd place, bronze medalist(s)	Sally Barsosio	Kenya	14:11
4	Helen Kimutai	Kenya	14:14
5	Susie Power	Australia	14:18
6	Catherine Kirui	Kenya	14:29
7	Elena Cosoveanu	Romania	14:32
8	Akiko Kato	Japan	14:34
9	Azumi Miyazaki	Japan	14:36
10	Sachiko Nakahito	Japan	14:40
11	Gabriela Szabo	Romania	14:45
12	Alemitu Bekele	Ethiopia	14:46
Full results

Teams
Rank	Team	Points
1st place, gold medalist(s)	Kenya: Gladys Ondeyo / 1; Pamela Chepchumba / 2; Sally Barsosio / 3; Helen Kimutai / 4; (Catherine Kirui) / (6)	10
2nd place, silver medalist(s)	Japan: Akiko Kato / 8; Azumi Miyazaki / 9; Sachiko Nakahito / 10; Yuko Kubota / 14; (Yoshiko Imura) / (16); (Chiemi Takahashi) / (25)	41
3rd place, bronze medalist(s)	Ethiopia: Alemitu Bekele / 12; Askale Bereda / 13; Yeshi Gebreselassie / 17; Getenesh Tamirat / 19; (Leila Aman) / (28)	61
4	Romania	95
5	Spain	123
6	Russia	138
7	South Africa	146
8	Germany	150
Full results

- Note: Athletes in parentheses did not score for the team result

== Medal table (unofficial) ==
Rank	Nation	Gold	Silver	Bronze	Total
1	Kenya	7	3	3	13
2	Portugal	1	0	1	2
3	Ethiopia	0	2	1	3
4	Japan	0	2	0	2
5	Ireland	0	1	0	1
6	France	0	0	1	1
6	Morocco	0	0	1	1
6	United States	0	0	1	1
Totals (8 entries)		8	8	8	24

- Note: Totals include both individual and team medals, with medals in the team competition counting as one medal.

== Participation ==
An unofficial count yields the participation of 653 athletes from 54 countries. This is in agreement with the official numbers as published.

- Angola (1)
- Argentina (14)
- Australia (15)
- Belarus (3)
- Belgium (22)
- Botswana (6)
- Brazil (19)
- Burundi (2)
- Canada (27)
- Chile (1)
- Colombia (4)
- Czech Republic (3)
- Denmark (11)
- Ecuador (13)
- Estonia (2)
- Ethiopia (26)
- Fiji (6)
- Finland (10)
- France (27)
- Germany (11)
- Hong Kong (2)
- Hungary (15)
- Iceland (1)
- India (18)
- Ireland (19)
- Israel (2)
- Italy (26)
- Japan (24)
- Kazakhstan (10)
- Kenya (25)
- Latvia (15)
- Mauritius (3)
- Mexico (10)
- Morocco (17)
- Netherlands (15)
- New Zealand (8)
- Norway (5)
- Poland (6)
- Portugal (21)
- Romania (10)
- Russia (20)
- Slovakia (2)
- South Africa (26)
- Spain (27)
- Sweden (5)
- Switzerland (14)
- Tunisia (6)
- Turkmenistan (4)
- United Kingdom (27)
- United States (27)
- Yemen (8)
- Zaire (1)
- Zambia (4)
- Zimbabwe (7)

== See also ==
- 1993 IAAF World Cross Country Championships – Senior men's race
- 1993 IAAF World Cross Country Championships – Junior men's race
- 1993 IAAF World Cross Country Championships – Senior women's race
- 1993 IAAF World Cross Country Championships – Junior women's race
- 1993 in athletics (track and field)
