= Pauline Konga =

Kenyan long-distance runner

Personal information
- Born: 10 April 1970 (age 56) Baringo County, Kenya
- Height: 158 cm (5 ft 2 in)
- Weight: 43 kg (95 lb)
Medal record
Women's athletics
Representing Kenya
Olympic Games
Silver medal – second place	1996 Atlanta	5,000 m
World Cross Country Championships
Gold medal – first place	1991 Antwerpen	Team competition
Gold medal – first place	1993 Amorebieta	Team competition

Pauline Konga (born 10 April 1970) is a Kenyan retired long-distance runner. At the 1996 Summer Olympics she won the silver medal in the 5,000 metres, making her the first Kenyan woman to win an Olympic medal.

== Career ==
In 1990, Konga finished a dismal 125th at the 1990 World Cross Country Championships. She improved to 15th at the 1991 World Cross Country Championships, and finished twelfth in the 3,000 metres at the 1991 World Championships. She also became the Kenyan champion in cross-country running (long course). In 1992 she finished a lowly 90th at the 1992 World Cross Country Championships, but improved to seventh at the 1993 World Cross Country Championships, also winning the gold in the team competition.

Konga participated in her first Olympics in 1992, failing to progress from the heats in the 3000 metres. In 1996 she became Kenyan 5000 metres champion and finished third at the 1996 Grand Prix Final. At the 1996 Olympic Games she won the silver medal in the 5000 metres, becoming the first Kenyan woman to win an Olympic medal.

Her personal bests were 8:37.76 minutes in the 3000 metres, achieved in August 1996 in Monaco; 14:47.51 minutes in the 5000 metres, achieved in August 1996 in Köln; and 1:09:33 hours in the half marathon, achieved in January 1996 in Marrakesh.

== Personal life ==
She was born in Baringo District. She is married to Paul Bitok, who won a silver medal in the men's 5000 metres at the 1992 and 1996 Olympics.
