= 1994 World Junior Championships in Athletics – Women's 3000 metres =

The women's 3000 metres event at the 1994 World Junior Championships in Athletics was held in Lisbon, Portugal, at Estádio Universitário de Lisboa on 20 and 22 July.

== Medalists ==
Gold	Gabriela Szabo; Romania
Silver	Susie Power; Australia
Bronze	Sally Barsosio; Kenya

== Results ==
=== Final ===
22 July

Rank	Name	Nationality	Time	Notes
1st place, gold medalist(s)	Gabriela Szabo	Romania	8:47.40	
2nd place, silver medalist(s)	Susie Power	Australia	8:56.93	
3rd place, bronze medalist(s)	Sally Barsosio	Kenya	8:59.34	
4	Annemari Sandell	Finland	9:04.10	
5	Pamela Chepchumba	Kenya	9:13.33	
6	Chiemi Takahashi	Japan	9:14.22	
7	Lu Jing	China	9:15.98	
8	Miwa Sugawara	Japan	9:16.57	
9	Birhan Dagne	Ethiopia	9:20.51	
10	Olivera Jevtić	Yugoslavia	9:29.14	
11	Deanna Arnhill	Canada	9:34.57	
12	Nicola Slater	United Kingdom	9:36.19	

=== Heats ===
20 July

==== Heat 1 ====
Rank	Name	Nationality	Time	Notes
1	Gabriela Szabo	Romania	9:05.38	Q
2	Susie Power	Australia	9:07.28	Q
3	Pamela Chepchumba	Kenya	9:12.45	Q
4	Olivera Jevtić	Yugoslavia	9:13.97	Q
5	Lu Jing	China	9:19.42	q
6	Miwa Sugawara	Japan	9:19.81	q
7	Catherine Berry	United Kingdom	9:29.48	
8	Stine Larsen	Norway	9:41.65	
9	Sarna Renfro	United States	9:45.43	
10	Getenesh Tamirat	Ethiopia	10:11.63	
11	Amal Al-Matari	Jordan	10:12.56	
12	Miriam Achote	Ecuador	10:16.05	

==== Heat 2 ====
Rank	Name	Nationality	Time	Notes
1	Sally Barsosio	Kenya	9:15.98	Q
2	Annemari Sandell	Finland	9:16.12	Q
3	Birhan Dagne	Ethiopia	9:19.22	Q
4	Chiemi Takahashi	Japan	9:22.08	Q
5	Nicola Slater	United Kingdom	9:23.25	q
6	Deanna Arnhill	Canada	9:28.27	q
7	Jeļena Čelnova	Latvia	9:33.67	
8	Letiwe Marakurwa	Zimbabwe	9:46.97	
9	Gabriele Bossmann	Germany	9:47.77	
10	Pa Pa	Myanmar	10:08.38	
11	Julia Stamps	United States	10:18.98	
12	Gulsara Dadabayeva	Tajikistan	10:25.90	
13	Motena Moshad	Lesotho	10:45.86	

== Participation ==
According to an unofficial count, 25 athletes from 20 countries participated in the event.

- Australia (1)
- Canada (1)
- China (1)
- Ecuador (1)
- Ethiopia (2)
- Finland (1)
- Germany (1)
- Japan (2)
- Jordan (1)
- Kenya (2)
- Latvia (1)
- Lesotho (1)
- Myanmar (1)
- Norway (1)
- Romania (1)
- Tajikistan (1)
- United Kingdom (2)
- United States (2)
- Yugoslavia (1)
- Zimbabwe (1)
