= Matt Giusto =

American long-distance runner

Personal information
- Nationality: American
- Born: October 25, 1966 (age 59) San Francisco, California, U.S.
- Height: 178 cm (5 ft 10 in)
- Weight: 62 kg (137 lb)

Sport
- Sport: Athletics
- Event: Middle/Long-distance
- Club: Foot Locker AC

Matthew J. Giusto (born October 25, 1966) is an American track and field athlete. He competed for the United States, running the 5,000 meters in the 1996 Olympics.

He was a 1984 graduate of San Mateo High School where he was the 1983 national champion at the Foot Locker Cross Country Championships. He went on to finish third in the 3200 meters at the CIF California State Meet.

While at the University of Arizona he was the 1988 NCAA Champion at 5,000 meters, thus he became the first male athlete to win both the Footlocker National Championship and an NCAA Championship.

By virtue of finishing second at the USA National Cross Country Championships, he ran on the USA team at the 1993 World Cross Country Championships.

He was the 1993 and 1994 USA National Champion at 5,000 meters and also in 1994, the Indoor 3,000 meter champion. He won the British AAA Championships title in the 3000 metres event at the 1989 AAA Championships.

He also took a shot at road running, winning the 1994 national road championship at 5K and the 1996 Crescent City Classic, which also was the national championship race.
