= Pamela Chepchumba =

Pamela Chepchumba (born March 8, 1979, in Kapsait, West Pokot District) is an athlete from Kenya. Her best achievements are from cross country running.

Aged only 13, Chemchumba competed at the 1992 IAAF World Cross Country Championships, finishing 27th in the junior race. Still at junior level, she participated in the 1994 and 1995 edition of IAAF World Cross Country Championships, finishing 7th and 10th respectively. At the time she took a break in running to concentrate in schooling, where she was lagging. She went to Kapkenda Secondary School in 1997.

Pamela Chepchumba was suspended for two years after testing positive for EPO at the 2003 IAAF World Cross Country Championships held in Lausanne, Switzerland. She had finished sixth, but was disqualified. She returned in 2005 and won the Udine Half Marathon.

Her husband Boaz Kimaiyo is also a runner, as is her younger brother Nicholas Koech, who mainly competes in road races. She has two daughters (as of 2007). She is managed by Federico Rosa and coached by Eric Kimaiyo.

== Achievements ==
Year	Competition	Venue	Position	Event	Notes
Representing Kenya
1993	World Cross Country Championships	Amorebieta, Spain	2nd	Junior Race (4.45 km)	14:09
1994	World Junior Championships	Lisbon, Portugal	5th	3000m	9:13.33
2000	World Half Marathon Championships	Veracruz, Mexico	5th	Half marathon	1:11:33
2001	World Cross Country Championships	Ostend, Belgium	5th	Long Race (7.7 km)	28:20
2001	World Cross Country Championships	Ostend, Belgium	1st	Long Team Race	18 pts
2002	World Cross Country Championships	Dublin, Ireland	9th	Long Race (7.974 km)	27:30
2002	World Half Marathon Championships	Brussels, Belgium	5th	Half marathon	1:09:30
2003	World Cross Country Championships	Lausanne, Switzerland	DQ	Long Race (8 km)	~~6th~~
2007	World Cross Country Championships	Mombasa, Kenya	6th	Long Race (8 km)	27:34
2007	World Road Running Championships	Udine, Italy	3rd	Half marathon	1:08:06
2007	World Road Running Championships	Udine, Italy	1st	Team Race	3:23:33
2008	World Road Running Championships	Rio de Janeiro, Brazil	3rd	Half marathon	1:10:01
2008	World Road Running Championships	Rio de Janeiro, Brazil	2nd	Team Race	3:31:24

=== More achievements ===
- 2001 Heusden International, 5000 metres - 1st.
- 2001 Parelloop 10K - 1st
- 2005 Udine Half Marathon, Italy - 1st
- 2005 Nairobi Marathon - 3rd
- 2006 Paris Marathon - 3rd
- 2006 Beijing Marathon - 2nd (time 2:34:51)
- 2006 Portugal Half Marathon - 1st
- 2007 Azkoitia-Azpeitia Half Marathon - 1st
- 2007 Milan Marathon - 1st (time 2:25:36, PB)
- 2007 Philadelphia Distance Run (half marathon) - 1st
- 2008 Ras Al Khaimah Half Marathon -2nd
- 2008 Lisbon Half Marathon -2nd
- 2008 Bogota Half Marathon -1st
- 2008 Hamburg Marathon - 2nd (time 2:28:36)
- 2008 Porto Half Marathon - 1st (time 1:10:26)
- 2009 Tokyo Marathon - 9th
- 2009 Porto Half Marathon - 1st (time 1:10:24)
- 2009 Honolulu Marathon - 3rd

== See also ==
- List of sportspeople sanctioned for doping offences
