= Dario Fegatelli =

Italian long-distance runner

Personal information
- Nationality: Italian
- Born: 28 August 1969 (age 56)

Sport
- Country: Italy
- Sport: Athletics
- Event: Long-distance running

Achievements and titles
- Personal best: Half marathon: 1:03:27 (1996)

Dario Fegatelli (born 28 August 1969) is a former Italian male long-distance runner who competed at one edition of the IAAF World Cross Country Championships at senior level (1993) and one of the IAAF World Half Marathon Championships (1996).
