= Patrizia Ritondo =

Italian long-distance runner

Personal information
- National team: Italy (4 caps in 1995-2004)
- Born: 18 September 1974 (age 51) Milan, Italy

Sport
- Country: Italy
- Sport: Athletics
- Event: Long-distance running

Achievements and titles
- Personal best: Half marathon: 1:14:21 (2002)

Patrizia Ritondo (born 18 September 1974) is a former Italian long-distance runner who competed at individual senior level at the IAAF World Half Marathon Championships.
