= Yuko Kawakami =

Japanese long-distance runner

Yuko Kawakami (川上 優子, Kawakami Yūko; born 1 August 1975 in Kumamoto) is a retired Japanese long-distance runner.

She finished fifteenth in 5000 metres at the 1997 World Championships. In 10,000 metres she finished seventh at the 1996 Summer Olympics, won the bronze medal at the East Asian Games and the gold medal at the 1998 Asian Games, finished twelfth at the 1999 World Championships and tenth at the 2000 Summer Olympics.

She also finished 36th at the 1995 World Cross Country Championships, and fourth with the Japanese team.

== Personal bests ==
- 3000 metres - 8:55.8 minutes (1998)
- 5000 metres - 15:17.34 minutes (1997)
- 10,000 metres - 31:09.46 minutes (2000)
- Half marathon - 1:09:38 hours (2002)
- Marathon - 2:34:09 hours (1999)
