= Li Ji (runner) =

Chinese orienteering athlete and long-distance runner

Li Ji (born 19 September 1979) is a retired Chinese orienteering athlete and long-distance runner who specialized in the 5000 and 10,000 metres.

She finished seventh at the 2000 Olympic Games, in a personal best time of 31:06.94 minutes, and won the silver medal (in the 5000 m) at the 2001 East Asian Games. Her personal best times on the 5000 metres was 15:34.31 minutes, achieved in September 1999 in Xi'an.

She was eventually found guilty of doping, and served a suspension from August 2001 to August 2003.

== Achievements ==
Year	Competition	Venue	Position	Notes
Representing China
2001	East Asian Games	Osaka, Japan	2nd	5000 m
