= Hellen Jemaiyo Kimutai =

Kenyan marathon runner (born 1977)

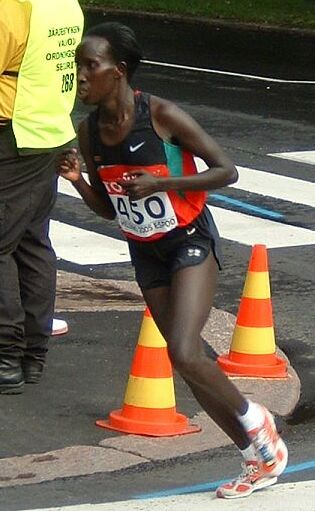
Hellen Jemaiyo Kimutai

Hellen Jemaiyo Kimutai (born 28 December 1977) is a Kenyan marathon runner.

She started out in cross country running and was fourth in the junior race at the 1993 IAAF World Cross Country Championships, taking the team gold medal with Kenya in a perfect score. She set a course record time of 1:05:28 hours to win the 20 Kilomètres de Paris in 2000.

Her personal best time is 2:25:53 hours, achieved in April 2003 winning the Hamburg Marathon. Her first senior international competition came at the 2005 World Championships in Athletics, where she finished ninth for Kenya in the marathon. She also won the 2005 Milan Marathon and 2007 Rock 'n' Roll San Diego Marathon. She represented Kenya in the marathon at the 2007 World Championships in Athletics but finished in 25th position.

She finished second at the 2009 Berlin Half Marathon. She took victory at the Vienna City Marathon, completing the course in a time of 2:31:08. She ran at the Frankfurt Marathon in October 2010, but only managed ninth place. Her two marathon outings of 2011 were a fifth-place finish at the Madrid Marathon and third place at the Baltimore Marathon. She won the Rome City Marathon in 2012.

She has four children with her husband Kenneth Kibet.

== Achievements ==
Year	Competition	Venue	Position	Event	Notes
Representing Kenya
1994	World Junior Championships	Lisbon, Portugal	14th (h)	1500m	4:23.79
2000	Rome City Marathon	Rome, Italy	3rd	Marathon	2:33:47
2003	Hamburg Marathon	Hamburg, Germany	1st	Marathon	2:25:53
2005	World Championships	Helsinki, Finland	9th	Marathon	2:26:14
2005	Milan Marathon	Milan, Italy	1st	Marathon	2:28:49
2007	Rock 'n' Roll San Diego Marathon	San Diego, United States	1st	Marathon	2:32:40
2010	Vienna Marathon	Vienna, Austria	1st	Marathon	2:31:08
2012	Rome Marathon	Rome, Italy	1st	Marathon	2:31:11
2012	Gold Coast Marathon	Gold Coast, Queensland, Australia	3rd	Marathon	2:36:44
