= Kathy Fleming =

American middle-distance runner

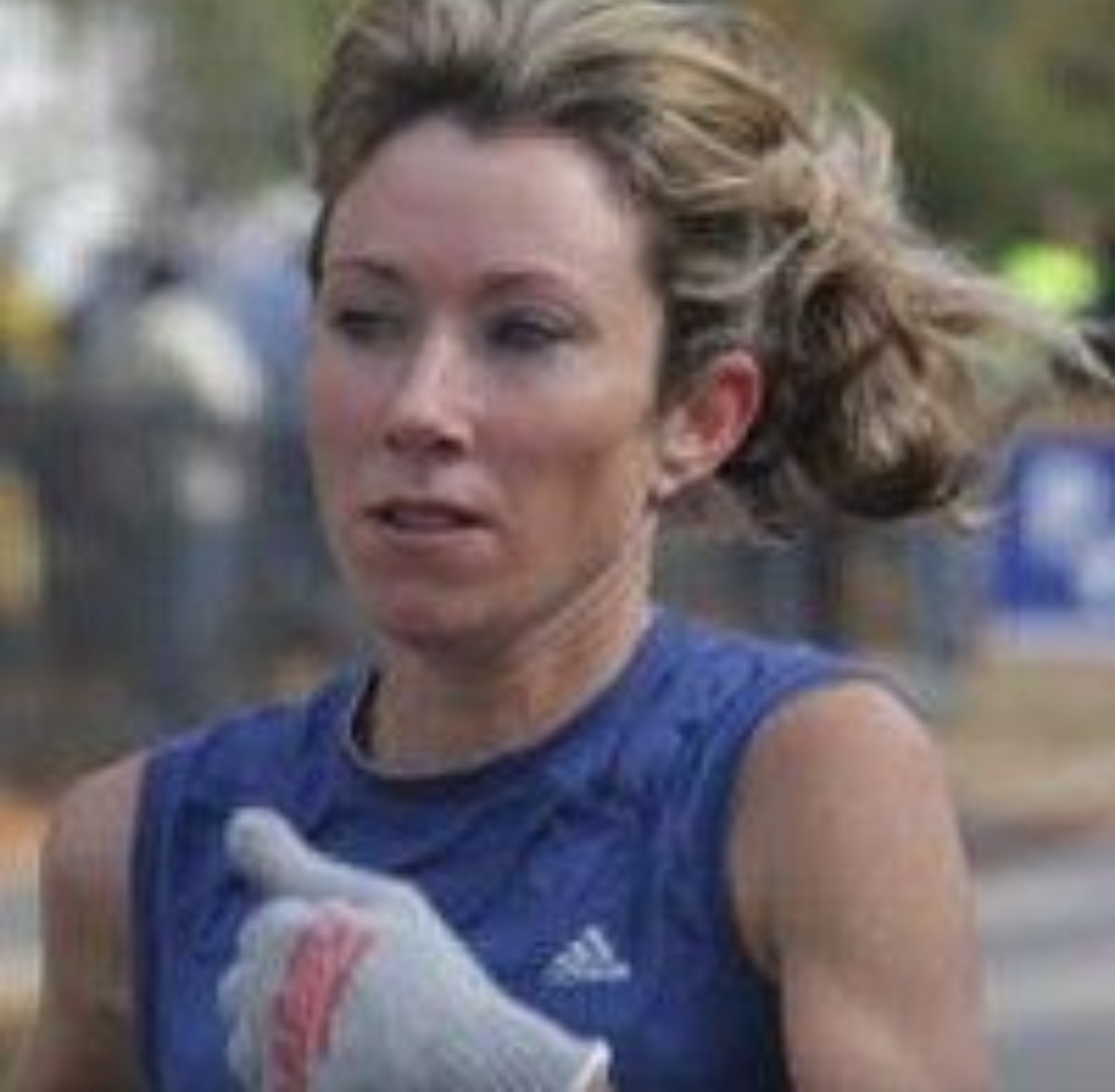
Fleming competing in a road race (2008)

Kathy Fleming (née Franey; born December 25, 1967) is an American retired middle-distance runner. In 1994, she was the USA Track and Field National Champion in the indoor 3000 meters.

== Early life and career ==
She was born on December 25, 1967 in Brooklyn, New York. While running for Massapequa High School in Massapequa, New York, she was a seven time New York State Champion. Her high school career includes big wins in the 1985 Penn Relays Girls 1500 meters and the Girls High School mile at the Millrose Games. She continued to Villanova University where she ran leadoff for the still standing Outdoor Distance Medley Relay World record team which she and her teammates set at the Penn Relays in 1988. She was a seven time NCAA All-American in the 1500 meters and 3000 meters. She was also captained the team when Villanova University won their first NCAA Women's Cross Country Championship in 1989.

== Professional career ==
Her primary distance was the 1500 meters. She ranked in the top ten of the 1500 meters five times in the United States from 1990 to 1998. She also ranked in the top ten of the 3000 meters four times. Her personal bests for the 1500 meters and the 3000 meters are 4:07.15 and 8:46.04 respectively. In 1996 she tied for 5th place in the 1500 meters at the United States Olympic Trials held in Atlanta, Georgia. She was eighth at the IAAF World Indoor Championships in the 3000m in 1993. She was the USA Track and Field Indoor National Champion in the same event a year later. In 1996 Franey Fleming won the prestigious Millrose Games Women's mile run 11 years after capturing the high school Millrose girls mile run making her the only athlete to do so. In 1997 she finished third place behind Deena Kastor and Lynn Jennings at the USA 8k Cross Country Championships in Portland, Oregon. In 1998 she finished 26th at the IAAF World Cross Country Championships held in Marrakech, Morocco where she and her US teammates won the bronze medal.

== Coaching career ==
In 1999 Franey Fleming began coaching as a full-time career at Boston College where she had been a part-time assistant coach since 1994. She and Head coach Randy Thomas were awarded the Big East Cross Country coaching staff of the year in 2000 after the team won the Big East Track and Field Championship and finished fourth at the NCAA Championships. She also coached Shannon Smith, Boston College's first female NCAA champion to her indoor NCAA 3000 meter title in 2001 along with many other notable NCAA All-Americans. Now Kathleen Franey Fleming has three kids, Sean, Patrick, and Caroline Fleming who reside in Natick, Massachusetts.
