= Farida Fatès =

French long-distance runner

Farida Fates
Personal information
- Nationality: French
- Born: 2 February 1962 (age 63) Jijel, Algeria
- Height: 1.66 m (5 ft 5 in)

Sport
- Event: Cross country running
- Club: Revin (1979—1987); AS Sarreguemines-Bitche (1988—1989); Athlétisme Sarreguemines-Sarrebourg Arrondissements; ASPTT Strasbourg (2000—2002)
- Coached by: Joël Bastien

Farida Fates (née Zigha; born 2 February 1962 in Jijel, Algeria) is a former French athlete, who specialized in long-distance running.

She won four track titles at the French Athletics Championships: over 1500 metres (1990), 3000 metres (1989 and 1994) and 5000 metres (1996). She also won three titles at the French Cross Country Championships (1990, 1996 and 1997).

On 21 August 1994, in Cologne, she improved the French 5000 m record by completing the distance in 15:16.41 minutes.

She won the bronze medal team at 1993 IAAF World Cross Country Championships and the team silver medal at the 1994 European Cross Country Championships.

== International competitions ==
Year	Competition	Venue	Position	Event	Notes
1993	World Cross Country Championships	Amorebieta-Etxano, Spain	8th	Individual	
1993	World Cross Country Championships	Amorebieta-Etxano, Spain	3rd	Team	
1993	Mediterranean Games	Narbonne, France	3rd	1500 m	4:12.60
1994	European Cup	Birmingham, United Kingdom	2nd	3000 m	8:53.40
1994	European Championships	Helsinki, Finland	7th	3000 m	8:46.04
1994	European Cross Country Championships	Alnwick, United Kingdom	2nd	Team	
1996	European Cup	Madrid	3rd	5000 m	15:47.72
1997	World Indoor Championships	Paris, France	7th	3000 m	8:54.98

== National titles ==
- French Championships in Athletics
  - 1500 m: 1990
  - 3000 m: 1989, 1994
  - 5000 m: 1996
- French Cross Country Championships
  - Long course: 1990, 1996, 1997

== Personal bests ==
Event	Performance	Location	Date
800 metres	2:02.65		1994
1500 metres	4:08.11		1994
3000 metres	8:46.04	Helsinki	1994
5000 metres	15:16.41	Cologne	1994
10000 metres	31:58.63	Leiria	1996
10 km	34:37	La Courneuve	2002
Half marathon	1:14:48	Paris	2002
