= Odile Ohier =

French long distance athlete (born 1963)

Personal information
- Nationality: French
- Born: November 19, 1963 (age 62) Dinan, Brittany, France

Sport
- Country: France
- Sport: Athletics
- Events: Long-distance running, Cross-country running

Odile Ohier (born 19 November 1963) is a French long distance and cross country athlete. She competed internationally for France in the late 1980s and 1990s, winning medals at the Francophone Games, the French Athletics Championships, and the IAAF World Cross Country Championships.

== Career ==
Ohier was born on 19 November 1963 in Dinan, Brittany, France. Her sister Marie-Hélène Ohier [fr] is also an athlete.

Ohier won a bronze medal in the 10,000m and finished fourth in the 3,000m at the 1989 Francophone Games in Casablanca, Morocco. She also won the sixth stage of the 1989 Barcelona International Women's Ekiden.

In 1990, Ohier won a silver medal at the 1990 French Athletics Championships in Nice, France.

In 1992, Ohier was the women's winner of the annual 10 km Corrida de Langueux race. She also competed at the 1992 IAAF World Half Marathon Championships.

In 1993, Ohier became a French champion, winning the long cross-country course at the French Cross-Country Championship. Also in 1993, she won a bronze medal in the long cross-country senior team course at the 1993 IAAF World Cross Country Championships.

In 1996, Ohier competed at the 1996 IAAF World Cross Country Championships in Stellenbosch, South Africa, coming 20th.
