= Chiemi Takahashi =

Japanese long-distance runner

Medal record

Women's athletics

Representing Japan

Asian Championships
Silver medal – second place	1998 Fukuoka	10,000 m

Chiemi Takahashi (高橋 千恵美, Takahashi Chiemi; born 16 February 1976 in Wakayanagi) is a retired Japanese athlete who competed in the long-distance events. She represented her country at the 2000 Summer Olympics, as well as three World Championships. She also took part in nine editions of World Cross Country Championships.

== Competition record ==
Year	Competition	Venue	Position	Event	Notes
Representing Japan
1992	Asian Junior Championships	New Delhi, India	3rd	3000 m	9:36.72
1994	World Junior Championships	Lisbon, Portugal	6th	3000 m	9:14.22
1995	World Championships	Gothenburg, Sweden	15th (h)	5000 m	15:35.13
1997	World Championships	Athens, Greece	10th	10,000 m	32:23.61
1998	Asian Championships	Fukuoka, Japan	2nd	10,000 m	32:32.99
1998	Asian Games	Bangkok, Thailand	3rd	10,000 m	32:20.68
1999	World Championships	Seville, Spain	5th	10,000 m	31:27.62
2000	Olympic Games	Sydney, Australia	15th	10,000 m	31:52.59

== Personal bests ==
- 3000 metres – 9:11.70 (Tokyo 1994)
- 5000 metres – 15:22.64 (Osaka 1999)
- 10,000 metres – 31:27.57 (Sendai 1998)
- 20 kilometres – 1:06:58 (Berlin 2002)
- Half marathon – 1:11:18 (Sendai 2001)
