= 2002 IAAF World Half Marathon Championships =

- Organisers: IAAF
- Edition: 11th
- Date: May 5
- Host city: Brussels, Belgium
- Events: 2
- Participation: 198 athletes from 60 nations

The 11th IAAF World Half Marathon Championships was held on May 5, 2002 in the city of Brussels, Belgium. A total of 198 athletes, 123 men and 75 women, from 60 countries took part. Detailed reports on the event and an appraisal of the results were given both for the men's race and for the women's race.

Complete results were published for the men's race, for the women's race, for men's team, and for women's team.

== Medallists ==
Event	Gold		Silver		Bronze	
Individual
Men	Paul Kosgei (KEN)	1:00:39	Jaouad Gharib (MAR)	1:00:42	John Yuda (TAN)	1:00:57
Women	Berhane Adere (ETH)	1:09:06	Susan Chepkemei (KEN)	1:09:13	Jeļena Prokopčuka (LAT)	1:09:15
Team
Team Men	Kenya	3:04:42	Japan	3:07:12	Ethiopia	3:07:25
Team Women	Kenya	3:28:22	Russia	3:30:05	Ethiopia	3:30:58

== Race results ==
=== Men's ===
Rank	Athlete	Nationality	Time	Notes
1st place, gold medalist(s)	Paul Kosgei	Kenya	1:00:39	
2nd place, silver medalist(s)	Jaouad Gharib	Morocco	1:00:42	PB
3rd place, bronze medalist(s)	John Yuda	Tanzania	1:00:57	
4	Yonas Kifle	Eritrea	1:01:05	
5	Tesfaye Jifar	Ethiopia	1:01:11	
6	Shadrack Hoff	South Africa	1:01:23	
7	Rachid Berradi	Italy	1:01:32	
8	Atsushi Sato	Japan	1:01:37	PB
9	Charles Kamathi	Kenya	1:02:01	
10	Paul Kirui	Kenya	1:02:02	
11	Julio Rey	Spain	1:02:10	
12	Javier Cortés	Spain	1:02:13	
13	Amebesse Tolossa	Ethiopia	1:02:19	
14	Marco Mazza	Italy	1:02:21	
15	Hendrick Ramaala	South Africa	1:02:27	
16	Alberto Chaíça	Portugal	1:02:29	
17	Toshihide Kato	Japan	1:02:35	
18	Augustin Togon	Kenya	1:02:59	
19	Kurao Umeki	Japan	1:03:00	
20	Francis Yiga	Uganda	1:03:04	PB
21	Zersenay Tadesse	Eritrea	1:03:05	
22	Tetsuo Nishikawa	Japan	1:03:06	
23	Mohamed Serbouti	France	1:03:08	
24	Augusto Gomes	France	1:03:09	
25	David Morris	United States	1:03:26	
26	Jean-Berchmans Ndayisenga	Burundi	1:03:27	
27	Guy Fays	Belgium	1:03:29	
28	Janne Holmén	Finland	1:03:33	
29	Vital Gahungu	Burundi	1:03:35	
30	Josia Thugwane	South Africa	1:03:39	
31	Scott Larson	United States	1:03:42	
32	Moustafa Ahmed Cheboto	Uganda	1:03:44	
33	Alberto Juzdado	Spain	1:03:47	
34	Alfred Shemweta	Sweden	1:03:49	
35	Jim Jurcevich	United States	1:03:51	PB
36	Hassan El Ahmadi	France	1:03:52	
37	Worku Bikila	Ethiopia	1:03:55	
38	Brian Sell	United States	1:03:57	PB
39	Odilón Cuahutle	Mexico	1:03:59	PB
40	Daniele Caimmi	Italy	1:04:00	
41	Ndabili Bashingili	Botswana	1:04:18	
42	Frédéric Collignon	Belgium	1:04:19	PB
43	Christian Nemeth	Belgium	1:04:22	
44	Getachew Kebede	Ethiopia	1:04:23	
45	Antonio Peña	Spain	1:04:24	
46	Stéphane Hannot	France	1:04:24	
47	Medison Chibwe	Zambia	1:04:28	
48	Marco Gielen	Netherlands	1:04:33	
49	Valdenor dos Santos	Brazil	1:04:34	
50	Pavel Faschingbauer	Czech Republic	1:04:39	
51	Zhang Donglin	China	1:04:46	
52	Thuso Dihoro	Botswana	1:04:53	
53	George Ntshiliza	South Africa	1:04:59	
54	Hidemori Noguchi	Japan	1:05:06	
55	Ahmed Jumaa Jaber	Qatar	1:05:07	
56	Wodage Zvadya	Israel	1:05:08	
57	Magnus Bergman	Sweden	1:05:08	
58	Jeff Campbell	United States	1:05:24	
59	Miguel Mallqui	Peru	1:05:26	
60	Takhir Mamashayev	Belarus	1:05:28	PB
61	Toni Bernadó	Andorra	1:05:29	
62	Hilaire Ntirampeba	Burundi	1:05:31	
63	Ali Mabrouk El-Zaidi	Libya	1:05:32	
64	Viktor Lomonosov	Belarus	1:05:33	
65	Constantino León	Peru	1:05:36	
66	Oleg Gutnik	Belarus	1:05:50	
67	Li Zhuhong	China	1:06:02	
68	William Struyven	France	1:06:02	
69	Enoch Skosana	South Africa	1:06:03	
70	Raúl Pacheco	Peru	1:06:04	
71	Yusuf Zepak	Turkey	1:06:11	
72	Ahmed Abdel Mougod Soliman	Egypt	1:06:12	
73	Denis Curzi	Italy	1:06:16	
74	Tesfit Berhe	Eritrea	1:06:16	
75	Jumah Al-Noor	Qatar	1:06:19	
76	Ramiro Morán	Spain	1:06:20	
77	Mcmillan Mwansa	Zambia	1:06:27	PB
78	Adamou Aboubakar	Cameroon	1:06:40	
79	Ahmed Adam Saleh	Qatar	1:06:56	
80	Foaad Abubaker	Qatar	1:06:56	PB
81	Li He	China	1:07:03	
82	Yevgeniy Medvednikov	Kazakhstan	1:07:05	
83	Eduardo Rojas	Mexico	1:07:12	
84	Zeki Öztürk	Turkey	1:07:21	
85	Khimu Giri	Nepal	1:07:22	PB
86	Drago Paripović	Croatia	1:07:27	
87	Martin Toroitich	Uganda	1:07:42	
88	Furkan Boyan	Turkey	1:07:48	
89	Ion Luchianov	Moldova	1:08:11	
90	Rik Ceulemans	Belgium	1:08:16	
91	Hussein Hamid Mousa	Qatar	1:08:30	
92	Ivica Škopac	Croatia	1:08:38	
93	Arkadiy Tolstyn/Nikitin	Kyrgyzstan	1:08:57	
94	Salah Juaim	Yemen	1:09:28	
95	Ahmet Yavuz	Turkey	1:09:41	
96	Bat-Ochir Ser-Od	Mongolia	1:09:54	
97	Rafael Muñoz	Mexico	1:10:13	
98	Nedeljko Ravić	Croatia	1:10:26	
99	Mathieu Kouanotso	Cameroon	1:10:41	
100	Umaru Mohamed	Nigeria	1:10:43	
101	Vasiliy Medvedev	Uzbekistan	1:10:43	
102	Raibat Dahal	Nepal	1:10:57	
103	Mohamed Issa	Libya	1:10:58	
104	Khasan Rakhimov	Uzbekistan	1:11:19	
105	Charles Cilia	Malta	1:11:24	
106	Sergey Zabavskiy	Tajikistan	1:11:29	
107	Nazirdin Akylbekov	Kyrgyzstan	1:12:55	
108	Dovran Amandjayev	Turkmenistan	1:13:24	
109	Kursan Jusupaliyev	Kyrgyzstan	1:14:40	
110	Sifli Ahar	Brunei	1:14:52	
111	Kaelo Mosalagae	Botswana	1:15:31	
112	Lee Kar Lun	Hong Kong	1:15:46	
113	Kun Sio Pan	Macau	1:16:23	PB
114	Mamadou Alpha Barry	Guinea	1:17:01	
115	Vladimir Escajadillo	Peru	1:21:33	
116	Mark Hydes	Cayman Islands	1:22:41	
117	Ihab Salama	Palestine	1:29:01	
—	Berhanu Addane	Ethiopia	DNF	
—	Amara Sangare	Guinea	DNF	
—	Robert Kipkoech Cheruiyot	Kenya	DNF	
—	Khaingaikhuu Uvgunkhuu	Mongolia	DNF	
—	Luís Novo	Portugal	DNF	
—	Mohammed Mourhit	Belgium	DQ^{†}	
—	Jean-Paul Niyonsaba	Burundi	DNS	

^{†}: Mohammed Mourhit from Belgium was initially 23rd (1:03:08), but tested positive for EPO.

=== Women's ===
Rank	Athlete	Nationality	Time	Notes
1st place, gold medalist(s)	Berhane Adere	Ethiopia	1:09:06	
2nd place, silver medalist(s)	Susan Chepkemei	Kenya	1:09:13	
3rd place, bronze medalist(s)	Jeļena Prokopčuka	Latvia	1:09:15	
4	Mihaela Botezan	Romania	1:09:24	PB
5	Pamela Chepchumba	Kenya	1:09:30	
6	Olivera Jevtić	Yugoslavia	1:09:33	
7	Lenah Cheruiyot	Kenya	1:09:39	
8	Marleen Renders	Belgium	1:09:40	
9	Mizuki Noguchi	Japan	1:09:43	
10	Asmae Leghzaoui	Morocco	1:09:46	
11	Kerryn McCann	Australia	1:09:47	
12	Svetlana Zakharova	Russia	1:09:48	PB
13	Lyudmila Petrova	Russia	1:09:55	
14	Sonia O'Sullivan	Ireland	1:10:04	PB
15	Luminița Talpoș	Romania	1:10:08	PB
16	Irina Safarova	Russia	1:10:22	
17	Asha Gigi	Ethiopia	1:10:42	PB
18	Leila Aman	Ethiopia	1:11:10	PB
19	Mikie Takanaka	Japan	1:11:16	
20	Ines Chenonge	Kenya	1:11:25	
21	Kiyomi Ogawa	Japan	1:11:27	
22	Constantina Diţă-Tomescu	Romania	1:11:34	
23	Silvia Skvortsova	Russia	1:11:39	
24	Shitaye Gemechu	Ethiopia	1:11:43	
25	Alina Tecuţă/Gherasim	Romania	1:11:48	
26	Gunhild Haugen	Norway	1:11:56	
27	Mari Ozaki	Japan	1:11:57	
28	Cristina Pomacu	Romania	1:12:19	
29	Wei Yanan	China	1:12:23	
30	Maria Guida	Italy	1:12:26	
31	Viktoriya Klimina	Russia	1:12:33	
32	Gloria Marconi	Italy	1:12:41	
33	Chantal Dällenbach	France	1:12:50	
34	Zhang Shujing	China	1:13:04	
35	Petra Kamínková/Drajzajtlová	Czech Republic	1:13:08	
36	Silvia Sommaggio	Italy	1:13:31	
37	María Abel	Spain	1:13:58	
37	María Abel	Sweden	1:13:58	
38	Worknesh Tola	Ethiopia	1:13:58	
39	Nili Avramski	Israel	1:13:59	PB
41	Irma Heeren	Netherlands	1:14:11	
42	Mounia Aboulahcen	Belgium	1:14:13	
43	Tegla Loroupe	Kenya	1:14:23	
44	Jin Li	China	1:14:36	
45	Monia Capelli	Italy	1:14:38	PB
46	Rodica Moroianu	France	1:14:49	
47	Amanda Wright-Allen	Great Britain	1:14:53	
48	Charné Rademeyer	South Africa	1:15:19	
49	Yelena Tolstygina	Belarus	1:15:27	
50	Sandra Van Den Haesevelde	Belgium	1:15:31	
51	Cathérine Lallemand	Belgium	1:15:59	
52	Rosa Gutierrez	United States	1:16:28	PB
53	Misti Demko	United States	1:16:51	
54	Kim Pawelek	United States	1:17:30	
55	Linda Somers	United States	1:17:38	
56	Monica Hostetler	United States	1:18:02	
57	Marina Gurbina	Kazakhstan	1:18:33	
58	Magdaline Morobi	South Africa	1:18:37	
59	Carol Galea	Malta	1:18:39	
60	Yekaterina Shatnaya	Kazakhstan	1:18:59	
61	Gulsara Dadabayeva	Tajikistan	1:19:08	
62	Caroline Desprez	France	1:19:10	
63	Ann Parmentier	Belgium	1:19:32	
64	Nicole Whiteford	South Africa	1:20:40	
65	Christiana Augustine	Nigeria	1:21:59	
66	Dildar Mamedova	Turkmenistan	1:21:59	PB
67	Rashida Sarbasova	Kazakhstan	1:23:06	PB
68	Chanda Mwansa	Zambia	1:25:43	
—	Marizete Rezende	Brazil	DNF	
—	Annemette Jensen	Denmark	DNF	
—	Zahia Dahmani	France	DNF	
—	Kadiatou Diallo	Guinea	DNF	
—	Stine Larsen	Norway	DNF	
—	Carlien Cornelissen	South Africa	DNF	
—	Irina Matrosova	Uzbekistan	DNF	
—	Yumiko Hara	Japan	DNS	
—	Rosita Rota Gelpi	Italy	DNS	
—	Maria Condrea	Moldova	DNS	
—	Nebiat Habtemariam	Eritrea	DNS	

== Team results ==
=== Men's ===
Rank	Country	Team	Time
1st place, gold medalist(s)	Kenya	Paul Kosgei; Charles Kamathi; Paul Kirui	3:04:42
2nd place, silver medalist(s)	Japan	Atsushi Sato; Toshihide Kato; Kurao Umeki	3:07:12
3rd place, bronze medalist(s)	Ethiopia	Tesfaye Jifar; Amebesse Tolossa; Worku Bikila	3:07:25
4	South Africa	Shadrack Hoff; Hendrick Ramaala; Josia Thugwane	3:07:29
5	Italy	Rachid Berradi; Marco Mazza; Daniele Caimmi	3:07:53
6	Spain	Julio Rey; Javier Cortés; Alberto Juzdado	3:08:10
7	France	Mohamed Serbouti; Augusto Gomes; Hassan El Ahmadi	3:10:09
8	Eritrea	Yonas Kifle; Zersenay Tadesse; Tesfit Berhe	3:10:26
9	United States	David Morris; Scott Larson; Jim Jurcevich	3:10:59
10	Belgium	Guy Fays; Frédéric Collignon; Christian Nemeth	3:12:10
11	Burundi	Jean-Berchmans Ndayisenga; Vital Gahungu; Hilaire Ntirampeba	3:12:33
12	Uganda	Francis Yiga; Moustafa Ahmed Cheboto; Martin Toroitich	3:14:30
13	Belarus	Takhir Mamashayev; Viktor Lomonosov; Oleg Gutnik	3:16:51
14	Peru	Miguel Mallqui; Constantino León; Raúl Pacheco	3:17:06
15	China	Zhang Donglin; Li Zhuhong; Li He	3:17:51
16	Qatar	Ahmed Jumaa Jaber; Jumah Al-Noor; Ahmed Adam Saleh	3:18:22
17	Turkey	Yusuf Zepak; Zeki Öztürk; Furkan Boyan	3:21:20
18	Mexico	Odilón Cuahutle; Eduardo Rojas; Rafael Muñoz	3:21:24
19	Botswana	Ndabili Bashingili; Thuso Dihoro; Kaelo Mosalagae	3:24:42
20	Croatia	Drago Paripović; Ivica Škopac; Nedeljko Ravić	3:26:31
21	Kyrgyzstan	Arkadiy Tolstyn/Nikitin; Nazirdin Akylbekov; Kursan Jusupaliyev	3:36:32

=== Women's ===
Rank	Country	Team	Time
1st place, gold medalist(s)	Kenya	Susan Chepkemei; Pamela Chepchumba; Lenah Cheruiyot	3:28:22
2nd place, silver medalist(s)	Russia	Svetlana Zakharova; Lyudmila Petrova; Irina Safarova	3:30:05
3rd place, bronze medalist(s)	Ethiopia	Berhane Adere; Asha Gigi; Leila Aman	3:30:58
4	Romania	Mihaela Botezan; Luminița Talpoș; Constantina Diţă-Tomescu	3:31:06
5	Japan	Mizuki Noguchi; Mikie Takanaka; Kiyomi Ogawa	3:32:26
6	Italy	Maria Guida; Gloria Marconi; Silvia Sommaggio	3:38:38
7	Belgium	Marleen Renders; Mounia Aboulahcen; Sandra Van Den Haesevelde	3:39:24
8	China	Wei Yanan; Zhang Shujing; Jin Li	3:40:03
9	France	Chantal Dällenbach; Rodica Moroianu; Caroline Desprez	3:46:49
10	United States	Rosa Gutierrez; Misti Demko; Kim Pawelek	3:50:49
11	South Africa	Charné Rademeyer; Magdaline Morobi; Nicole Whiteford	3:54:36
12	Kazakhstan	Marina Gurbina; Yekaterina Shatnaya; Rashida Sarbasova	4:00:38

== Participation ==
The participation of 198 athletes (123 men/75 women) from 60 countries is reported.

- Andorra (1)
- Australia (1)
- Belarus (4)
- Belgium (10)
- Botswana (3)
- Brazil (2)
- Brunei (1)
- Burundi (3)
- Cameroon (2)
- Cayman Islands (1)
- China (6)
- Croatia (3)
- Czech Republic (2)
- Denmark (1)
- Egypt (1)
- Eritrea (3)
- Ethiopia (10)
- Finland (1)
- France (9)
- Guinea (3)
- Hong Kong (1)
- Ireland (1)
- Israel (2)
- Italy (8)
- Japan (9)
- Kazakhstan (4)
- Kenya (10)
- Kyrgyzstan (3)
- Latvia (1)
- Libya (2)
- Macau (1)
- Malta (2)
- Mexico (3)
- Moldova (1)
- Mongolia (2)
- Morocco (2)
- Netherlands (2)
- Nepal (2)
- Nigeria (2)
- Norway (2)
- Palestine (1)
- Peru (4)
- Portugal (2)
- Qatar (5)
- Romania (5)
- Russia (5)
- South Africa (9)
- Spain (6)
- Sweden (3)
- Tajikistan (2)
- Tanzania (1)
- Turkey (4)
- Turkmenistan (2)
- Uganda (3)
- United Kingdom (1)
- United States (10)
- Uzbekistan (3)
- Yemen (1)
- Yugoslavia (1)
- Zambia (3)

== See also ==
- 2002 in athletics (track and field)
