= 2003 World Championships in Athletics – Women's marathon =

The women's marathon at the 2003 World Championships in Paris, France, was held on Sunday, 31 August 2003, starting at 14:20h local time.

== Medalists ==
Gold	Catherine Ndereba; Kenya (KEN)
Silver	Mizuki Noguchi; Japan (JPN)
Bronze	Masako Chiba; Japan (JPN)

== Abbreviations ==
- All times shown are in hours:minutes:seconds

DNS	did not start
NM	no mark
WR	world record
AR	area record
NR	national record
PB	personal best
SB	season best

== Intermediates ==
Rank	Number	Athlete	Time
5 KILOMETRES
1	888	Constantina Tomescu (ROM)	16:45
2	630	Takami Ominami (JPN)	17:17
3	881	Nuţa Olaru (ROM)	17:17
4	797	Stine Larsen (NOR)	17:17
5	328	Workenesh Tola (ETH)	17:17
10 KILOMETRES
1	888	Constantina Tomescu (ROM)	34:02
2	324	Asha Gigi (ETH)	34:14
3	630	Takami Ominami (JPN)	34:14
4	708	Kenza Wahbi (MAR)	34:14
5	885	Luminiţa Talpoş (ROM)	34:15
15 KILOMETRES
1	888	Svetlana Zakharova (RUS)	51:19
2	885	Luminiţa Talpoş (ROM)	51:19
3	858	Ham Bong-Sil (PRK)	51:20
4	881	Nuţa Olaru (ROM)	51:20
5	797	Stine Larsen (NOR)	51:20
20 KILOMETRES
1	888	Svetlana Zakharova (RUS)	1:08:59
2	797	Stine Larsen (NOR)	1:09:00
3	975	Olivera Jevtić (SCG)	1:09:00
4	629	Mizuki Noguchi (JPN)	1:09:00
5	881	Nuţa Olaru (ROM)	1:09:00
HALF MARATHON
1	885	Luminiţa Talpoş (ROM)	1:12:46
2	630	Takami Ominami (JPN)	1:12:46
3	888	Svetlana Zakharova (RUS)	1:12:46
4	881	Nuţa Olaru (ROM)	1:12:46
5	182	Zhang Shujing (CHN)	1:12:46
25 KILOMETRES
1	885	Luminiţa Talpoş (ROM)	1:26:34
2	629	Mizuki Noguchi (JPN)	1:26:34
3	888	Svetlana Zakharova (RUS)	1:26:34
4	858	Ham Bong-Sil (PRK)	1:26:34
5	881	Nuţa Olaru (ROM)	1:26:34
30 KILOMETRES
1	629	Mizuki Noguchi (JPN)	1:44:01
2	317	Elfenesh Alemu (ETH)	1:44:01
3	858	Ham Bong-Sil (PRK)	1:44:01
4	888	Svetlana Zakharova (RUS)	1:44:01
5	881	Catherine Ndereba (KEN)	1:44:01
35 KILOMETRES
1	881	Catherine Ndereba (KEN)	2:00:47
2	629	Mizuki Noguchi (JPN)	2:00:51
3	632	Naoko Sakamoto (JPN)	2:00:57
4	858	Masako Chiba (JPN)	2:01:01
5	858	Ham Bong-Sil (PRK)	2:01:03
40 KILOMETRES
1	881	Catherine Ndereba (KEN)	2:16:45
2	629	Mizuki Noguchi (JPN)	2:17:05
3	632	Naoko Sakamoto (JPN)	2:17:48
4	858	Masako Chiba (JPN)	2:17:49
5	858	Ham Bong-Sil (PRK)	2:17:57

== Final ranking ==
Rank	Athlete	Time	Note
1st place, gold medalist(s)	Catherine Ndereba (KEN)	2:23:55	
2nd place, silver medalist(s)	Mizuki Noguchi (JPN)	2:24:14	
3rd place, bronze medalist(s)	Masako Chiba (JPN)	2:25:09	
4	Naoko Sakamoto (JPN)	2:25:25	
5	Ham Bong-sil (PRK)	2:25:31	NR
6	Elfenesh Alemu (ETH)	2:26:29	
7	Joyce Chepchumba (KEN)	2:26:33	SB
8	Olivera Jevtić (SCG)	2:26:49	
9	Svetlana Zakharova (RUS)	2:26:53	
10	Shitaye Gemechu (ETH)	2:27:26	SB
11	Nuţa Olaru (ROU)	2:28:24	SB
12	Zhang Shujing (CHN)	2:29:24	
13	Beatriz Ros (ESP)	2:29:25	PB
14	Li Helan (CHN)	2:29:46	SB
15	María Abel (ESP)	2:30:15	SB
16	Lena Gavelin (SWE)	2:30:39	NR
17	Stine Larsen (NOR)	2:30:44	
18	Luminiţa Talpoş (ROU)	2:30:49	
19	Asha Gigi (ETH)	2:31:01	PB
20	Ulrike Maisch (GER)	2:31:21	PB
21	Rakiya Maraoui (FRA)	2:31:23	SB
22	Viktoriya Klimina (RUS)	2:31:45	SB
23	Annemette Jensen (DEN)	2:31:55	PB
24	Ri Kum-Sil (PRK)	2:32:08	PB
25	Larisa Zyuzko (RUS)	2:32:26	
26	Marie Söderström (SWE)	2:32:27	SB
27	Takami Ominami (JPN)	2:32:31	
28	Sandy Jacobson (CAN)	2:33:51	PB
29	Kim Jong-Sun (PRK)	2:34:12	
30	Meseret Kotu (ETH)	2:34:19	SB
31	María Teresa Pulido (ESP)	2:34:37	
32	Simona Staicu (HUN)	2:34:51	
33	Jill Boaz (USA)	2:34:54	PB
34	Fatima Yvelain (FRA)	2:36:20	
35	Kenza Wahbi (MAR)	2:36:29	PB
36	Jin Li (CHN)	2:37:10	SB
37	Linda Somers Smith (USA)	2:37:14	SB
38	Svetlana Demidenko (RUS)	2:37:19	SB
39	Jo Lodge (GBR)	2:37:56	SB
40	Irina Timofeyeva (RUS)	2:38:06	SB
41	Lucilla Andreucci (ITA)	2:38:22	
42	Gloria Marconi (ITA)	2:38:26	
43	Giovanna Volpato (ITA)	2:38:38	
44	Nadia Ejjafini (BHR)	2:38:39	PB
45	Aurica Buia (ROU)	2:39:04	
46	Workenesh Tola (ETH)	2:39:25	
47	Jane Salumäe (EST)	2:39:36	SB
48	Zahia Dahmani (FRA)	2:40:34	
49	Banuelia Katesigwa (TAN)	2:40:45	
50	Fátima Silva (POR)	2:40:59	
51	Mihaela Botezan (ROU)	2:41:13	
52	Hanan Fahroun (MAR)	2:42:56	PB
53	Choi Kyung-Hee (KOR)	2:43:38	
54	Hafida Gadi (FRA)	2:45:53	
55	Tamara Lave (USA)	2:46:22	PB
56	Jong Yong-Ok (PRK)	2:50:21	
57	Epiphanie Nyirabarame (RWA)	2:54:16	PB
58	Simona Viola (ITA)	2:54:27	
59	Kelly Keane (USA)	2:55:26	SB
60	Sophie Gordon (PYF)	3:00:53	
61	Priscilla Mamba (SWZ)	3:18:35	SB
62	Sonia Lopes (CPV)	3:21:59	
DID NOT FINISH (DNF)
—	Fatima Hajjami (FRA)	DNF	
—	Sylvia Mosqueda (USA)	DNF	
—	Beatrice Omwanza (KEN)	DNF	
—	Rie Matsuoka (JPN)	DNF	
—	Constantina Diță (ROU)	DNF	
—	Rosaria Console (ITA)	DNF	
DID NOT START (DNS)
—	Anna Pichrtová (CZE)	DNS	

== See also ==
- Athletics at the 2003 Pan American Games – Women's marathon
- 2003 World Marathon Cup
- Athletics at the 2004 Summer Olympics – Women's marathon
