= 2003 IAAF World Half Marathon Championships =

- Organisers: IAAF
- Edition: 12th
- Date: October 4
- Host city: Vilamoura, Algarve, Portugal
- Events: 2

The 12th IAAF World Half Marathon Championships was held on October 4, 2003 in Vilamoura, Portugal. A total of 171 athletes, 98 men and 73 women, from 49 countries took part. Detailed reports on the event and an appraisal of the results were given both for the men's race and for the women's race.

Complete results were published for the men's race, for the women's race, for men's team, and for women's team.

== Medallists ==
Event	Gold		Silver		Bronze	
Individual
Men	Martin Lel (KEN)	1:00:49	Fabiano Joseph (TAN)	1:00:52	Martin Sulle (TAN)	1:00:56
Women	Paula Radcliffe (GBR)	1:07:35	Berhane Adere (ETH)	1:09:02	Benita Johnson (AUS)	1:09:26
Team
Team Men	Tanzania	3:03:01	Kenya	3:03:09	Ethiopia	3:07:34
Team Women	Russia	3:30:16	Japan	3:34:23	Romania	3:35:07

== Race results ==
=== Men's ===
Rank	Athlete	Nationality	Time	Notes
1st place, gold medalist(s)	Martin Lel	Kenya	1:00:49	PB
2nd place, silver medalist(s)	Fabiano Joseph	Tanzania	1:00:52	PB
3rd place, bronze medalist(s)	Martin Sulle	Tanzania	1:00:56	PB
4	John Cheruiyot Korir	Kenya	1:01:02	
5	John Yuda	Tanzania	1:01:13	
6	Yusuf Songoka	Kenya	1:01:18	
7	Zersenay Tadesse	Eritrea	1:01:26	PB
8	Jackson Koech	Kenya	1:01:28	PB
9	Tesfaye Tola	Ethiopia	1:01:35	
10	Ridouane Harroufi	Morocco	1:02:46	
11	Dereje Adere	Ethiopia	1:02:47	
12	Abderrahim Goumri	Morocco	1:02:59	
13	Paulo Gomes	Portugal	1:03:00	PB
14	Kazuyuki Maeda	Japan	1:03:07	
15	Wilson Busienei	Uganda	1:03:08	
16	Mesfin Hailu	Ethiopia	1:03:12	
17	Tariku Jufar	Ethiopia	1:03:23	
18	Rachid Aït Bensalem	Morocco	1:03:37	
19	Abdelghani Lahlali	France	1:03:37	
20	Oscar Fernández	Spain	1:03:41	
21	Alex Malinga	Uganda	1:03:41	PB
22	Saïd Belhout	Algeria	1:03:48	PB
23	Tekle Menghisteab	Eritrea	1:03:49	
24	Ignacio Cáceres	Spain	1:03:52	SB
25	Brian Sell	United States	1:03:53	PB
26	Mostafa Errebbah	Italy	1:03:54	
27	Rachid El-Ghanmouni	Morocco	1:04:00	
28	Tarik Bouzid	France	1:04:01	
29	Tesfayohannes Mesfen	Eritrea	1:04:10	PB
30	Mustafa Mohamed	Sweden	1:04:14	
31	Mohamed Serbouti	France	1:04:17	
32	Toshinari Suwa	Japan	1:04:18	
33	Solomon Tsige	Ethiopia	1:04:19	
34	Ottaviano Andriani	Italy	1:04:23	
35	Sergio Chiesa	Italy	1:04:34	
36	Odilón Cuahutle	Mexico	1:04:41	
37	Masahiko Takeyasu	Japan	1:04:46	
38	José Dias	Portugal	1:04:48	
39	Rik Ceulemans	Belgium	1:04:50	
40	Wataru Okutani	Japan	1:04:51	
41	Joachim Nshimirimana	Burundi	1:04:54	
42	Said Hank	Algeria	1:04:55	
43	Martin Toroitich	Uganda	1:04:57	
44	Eduardo Rojas	Mexico	1:05:17	
45	Iván Sánchez	Spain	1:05:20	SB
46	Karl Rasmussen	Norway	1:05:22	
47	Kamal Kohil	Algeria	1:05:48	
48	Francesco Ingargiola	Italy	1:05:53	
49	Scott Westcott	Australia	1:05:57	
50	Jussi Utriainen	Finland	1:05:59	
51	Teren Jameson	United States	1:06:08	
52	José Alejandro Semprún	Venezuela	1:06:21	
53	Franklin Tenorio	Ecuador	1:06:23	
54	Fabio Rinaldi	Italy	1:06:26	
55	Mark Tucker	Australia	1:06:28	
56	Cian McLoughlin	Ireland	1:06:48	
57	Rachid Boulenouar	Algeria	1:07:04	
58	Claes Nyberg	Sweden	1:07:12	
59	Wim Borms	Belgium	1:07:18	
60	Scott Strand	United States	1:07:32	
61	Pedro Mora	Venezuela	1:07:39	
62	Christian Nemeth	Belgium	1:07:50	
63	Francis Yiga	Uganda	1:07:51	
64	Jesús Primo	Mexico	1:08:02	
65	Sun Wenli	China	1:08:19	
66	Zheng Kai	China	1:09:06	
67	Paulo Catarino	Portugal	1:09:08	
68	Ivica Škopac	Croatia	1:09:11	
69	Francisco Roldán	Ecuador	1:09:42	
70	António Zeferino	Cape Verde	1:09:45	
71	Augusto Gomes	France	1:09:49	
72	John Buhagiar	Malta	1:11:04	NR
73	Wang Xiangfeng	China	1:11:26	
74	Polibio Méndez	Ecuador	1:11:31	
75	César Condori	Bolivia	1:11:36	
76	Appachu Chinnappa	India	1:11:36	
77	Kennady Chinna Ramu	India	1:11:42	
78	Artyom Tetenkin	Kyrgyzstan	1:11:47	
79	Matt Thull	United States	1:12:26	
80	Pablo Gardiol	Uruguay	1:12:32	
81	Alexei Scutaru	Moldova	1:12:53	
82	Charles Cilia	Malta	1:13:03	
83	Sechaba Bohosi	Lesotho	1:15:44	
84	Que Yin Tik	Hong Kong	1:17:57	
85	Naseer Ismail	Maldives	1:21:55	NR
86	Mok Bon Thouen	Cambodia	1:25:46	
—	José Alberto Montenegro	Argentina	DNF	
—	William Amorin	Brazil	DNF	
—	Buenaventura Yanez	Equatorial Guinea	DNF	
—	Richard Muscat	Gibraltar	DNF	
—	Michael Sánchez	Gibraltar	DNF	
—	Shashi Prakash	India	DNF	
—	Lok Wai Kin	Macau	DNF	
—	Mohamed El-Hattab	Morocco	DNF	
—	Luís Jesús	Portugal	DNF	
—	Manuel Magalhães	Portugal	DNF	
—	Simon Labiche	Seychelles	DNF	
—	Ryan Kirkpatrick	United States	DNF	
—	Clotairs Ngoma	Congo	DNS	
—	Sydney Pioh	Congo	DNS	
—	Kenta Oshima	Japan	DNS	
—	Paul Kiprop Kirui	Kenya	DNS	
—	Jafred Lorone	Uganda	DNS	

=== Women's ===
Rank	Athlete	Nationality	Time	Notes
1st place, gold medalist(s)	Paula Radcliffe	Great Britain	1:07:35	
2nd place, silver medalist(s)	Berhane Adere	Ethiopia	1:09:02	
3rd place, bronze medalist(s)	Benita Johnson	Australia	1:09:26	
4	Lidiya Grigoryeva	Russia	1:09:32	PB
5	Constantina Diţă-Tomescu	Romania	1:10:05	
6	Alla Zhilyayeva	Russia	1:10:13	
7	Lyudmila Biktasheva	Russia	1:10:31	PB
8	Susan Chepkemei	Kenya	1:10:35	
9	Mikie Takanaka	Japan	1:10:36	
10	Alina Ivanova	Russia	1:10:59	PB
11	Helena Javornik	Slovenia	1:11:17	
12	Sylvia Mosqueda	United States	1:11:22	
13	Takako Kotorida	Japan	1:11:37	
14	Yesenia Centeno	Spain	1:11:53	
15	Luminița Talpoș	Romania	1:12:02	
16	Risa Hagiwara	Japan	1:12:10	
17	Galina Bogomolova	Russia	1:12:12	
18	Corinne Raux	France	1:12:17	
19	Yumiko Hara	Japan	1:12:21	
20	Bruna Genovese	Italy	1:12:38	PB
21	Teyba Erkesso	Ethiopia	1:12:43	
22	Malika Asahssah	Morocco	1:12:49	
23	Nuta Olaru	Romania	1:13:00	
24	Fatiha Klilech-Fauvel	France	1:13:34	SB
25	Teresa Récio	Spain	1:13:42	PB
26	Beatriz Santíago	Spain	1:13:44	
27	Rosemary Ryan	Ireland	1:13:45	PB
28	Živilė Balčiūnaitė	Lithuania	1:13:47	SB
29	Rosaria Console	Italy	1:13:54	
30	Kan Yongying	China	1:13:56	
31	Kenza Wahbi	Morocco	1:14:05	
32	Anna Incerti	Italy	1:14:08	
33	Christelle Daunay	France	1:14:11	
34	Kathy Butler	Great Britain	1:14:17	
35	Magdeline Chemjor	Kenya	1:14:42	
36	Derebe Alemu	Ethiopia	1:14:52	
37	Hayley Yelling	Great Britain	1:14:52	
38	Nebiat Habtemariam	Eritrea	1:14:54	PB
39	Souad Aït Salem	Algeria	1:15:07	PB
40	Magdalena Lewy	United States	1:15:20	
41	Salina Kosgei	Kenya	1:15:41	
42	Debbie Robinson/Mason	Great Britain	1:16:08	
43	Noémie Flotté	France	1:16:28	
44	Bev Jenkins	Great Britain	1:16:37	
45	Patrizia Ritondo	Italy	1:16:49	
46	Elisabete Lopes	Portugal	1:16:58	PB
47	Ashu Kasim	Ethiopia	1:17:29	
48	Christine Clifton	United States	1:17:40	
49	Bouchra Chaabi	Morocco	1:17:45	
50	Analídia Torre	Portugal	1:17:48	
51	Fernanda Miranda	Portugal	1:17:49	
52	Sara Wells	United States	1:18:03	
53	Marily dos Santos	Brazil	1:18:18	
54	Sisay Measo	Ethiopia	1:19:13	
55	Liu Lixia	China	1:19:32	
56	Nathalie Loubelle	Belgium	1:21:23	
57	Tatyana Belkina	Belarus	1:21:55	
58	Pushpa Devi	India	1:22:19	
59	Sonia Lopes	Cape Verde	1:24:59	
60	Sylvie Mulle	Belgium	1:25:51	
61	Sarbjett Kaur	India	1:26:08	PB
62	Mamokete Lechela	Lesotho	1:27:01	
63	Merceditas Cuevas	Uruguay	1:27:12	
64	Giselle Camilleri	Malta	1:27:41	
65	Lidija Rajčić	Croatia	1:28:04	
66	Moleboheng Mafata	Lesotho	1:29:05	
67	Hidangmayum Devi	India	1:30:14	
68	Olesia Orlova	Kyrgyzstan	1:37:40	
—	Luminita Zaituc	Germany	DNF	
—	Zhor El-Kamch	Morocco	DNF	
—	Mihaela Botezan	Romania	DNF	
—	Iulia Olteanu/Negura	Romania	DNF	
—	Marla Runyan	United States	DNF	
—	Ida Brunelle Kiyindou	Congo	DNS	
—	Katie Bayock	Cameroon	DNS	
—	Hellen Jemaiyo Kimutai	Kenya	DNS	

== Team results ==
=== Men's ===
Rank	Country	Team	Time
1st place, gold medalist(s)	Tanzania	Fabiano Joseph; Martin Sulle; John Yuda	3:03:01
2nd place, silver medalist(s)	Kenya	Martin Lel; John Cheruiyot Korir; Yusuf Songoka	3:03:09
3rd place, bronze medalist(s)	Ethiopia	Tesfaye Tola; Dereje Adere; Mesfin Hailu	3:07:34
4	Morocco	Ridouane Harroufi; Abderrahim Goumri; Rachid Aït Bensalem	3:09:22
5	Eritrea	Zersenay Tadesse; Tekle Menghisteab; Tesfayohannes Mesfen	3:09:25
6	Uganda	Wilson Busienei; Alex Malinga; Martin Toroitich	3:11:46
7	France	Abdelghani Lahlali; Tarik Bouzid; Mohamed Serbouti	3:11:55
8	Japan	Kazuyuki Maeda; Toshinari Suwa; Masahiko Takeyasu	3:12:11
9	Italy	Mostafa Errebbah; Ottaviano Andriani; Sergio Chiesa	3:12:51
10	Spain	Oscar Fernández; Ignacio Cáceres; Iván Sánchez	3:12:53
11	Algeria	Saïd Belhout; Said Hank; Kamal Kohil	3:14:31
12	Portugal	Paulo Gomes; José Dias; Paulo Catarino	3:16:56
13	United States	Brian Sell; Teren Jameson; Scott Strand	3:17:33
14	Mexico	Odilón Cuahutle; Eduardo Rojas; Jesús Primo	3:18:00
15	Belgium	Rik Ceulemans; Wim Borms; Christian Nemeth	3:19:58
16	Ecuador	Franklin Tenorio; Francisco Roldán; Polibio Méndez	3:27:36
17	China	Sun Wenli; Zheng Kai; Wang Xiangfeng	3:28:51
—	India	Appachu Chinnappa; Kennady Chinna Ramu; Shashi Prakash	DNF

=== Women's ===
Rank	Country	Team	Time
1st place, gold medalist(s)	Russia	Lidiya Grigoryeva; Alla Zhilyayeva; Lyudmila Biktasheva	3:30:16
2nd place, silver medalist(s)	Japan	Mikie Takanaka; Takako Kotorida; Risa Hagiwara	3:34:23
3rd place, bronze medalist(s)	Romania	Constantina Diţă-Tomescu; Luminița Talpoș; Nuta Olaru	3:35:07
4	Ethiopia	Berhane Adere; Teyba Erkesso; Derebe Alemu	3:36:37
5	Great Britain	Paula Radcliffe; Kathy Butler; Hayley Yelling	3:36:44
6	Spain	Yesenia Centeno; Teresa Récio; Beatriz Santíago	3:39:19
7	France	Corinne Raux; Fatiha Klilech-Fauvel; Christelle Daunay	3:40:02
8	Italy	Bruna Genovese; Rosaria Console; Anna Incerti	3:40:40
9	Kenya	Susan Chepkemei; Magdeline Chemjor; Salina Kosgei	3:40:58
10	United States	Sylvia Mosqueda; Magdalena Lewy; Christine Clifton	3:44:22
11	Morocco	Malika Asahssah; Kenza Wahbi; Bouchra Chaabi	3:44:39
12	Portugal	Elisabete Lopes; Analídia Torre; Fernanda Miranda	3:52:35
13	India	Pushpa Devi; Sarbjett Kaur; Hidangmayum Devi	4:18:41

== Participation ==
The participation of 171 athletes (98 men/73 women) from 49 countries is reported. Although announced, athletes from Cameroon and Republic of the Congo did not show.

- Algeria (5)
- Argentina (1)
- Australia (3)
- Belarus (1)
- Belgium (5)
- Bolivia (1)
- Brazil (2)
- Burundi (1)
- Cambodia (1)
- Cape Verde (2)
- China (5)
- Croatia (2)
- Ecuador (3)
- Equatorial Guinea (1)
- Eritrea (4)
- Ethiopia (10)
- Finland (1)
- France (8)
- Germany (1)
- Gibraltar (2)
- Hong Kong (1)
- India (6)
- Ireland (2)
- Italy (9)
- Japan (8)
- Kenya (7)
- Kyrgyzstan (2)
- Lesotho (3)
- Lithuania (1)
- Macau (1)
- Maldives (1)
- Malta (3)
- Moldova (1)
- Morocco (9)
- Mexico (3)
- Norway (1)
- Portugal (8)
- Romania (5)
- Russia (5)
- Seychelles (1)
- Slovenia (1)
- Spain (6)
- Sweden (2)
- Tanzania (3)
- Uganda (4)
- United Kingdom (5)
- United States (10)
- Uruguay (2)
- Venezuela (2)

== See also ==
- 2003 in athletics (track and field)
