= Athletics at the 2001 Summer Universiade – Women's half marathon =

The women's half marathon event at the 2001 Summer Universiade was held in Beijing, China on 1 September.

== Results ==
Rank	Athlete	Nationality	Time	Notes
1st place, gold medalist(s)	Ham Pong Sil	North Korea	1:15:24	
2nd place, silver medalist(s)	Miki Oyama	Japan	1:15:31	
3rd place, bronze medalist(s)	Kim Chang Ok	North Korea	1:15:36	
4	Ri Kum Sil	North Korea	1:16:09	
5	Zhang Shujing	China	1:16:49	
6	Ikuko Yoshida	Japan	1:17:18	
7	Marina Kruppa	United States	1:17:48	
8	Asako Yamazaki	Japan	1:19:52	
9	Cha Jong Ok	North Korea	1:21:29	
10	Naima Bara	Morocco	1:22:19	
11	Janelle Olsen	United States	1:23:11	
12	Timea Zsiga	Hungary	1:24:04	
13	Alisha Awal	Nepal	1:36:43	
