= 2005 World Championships in Athletics – Women's marathon =

The Women's Marathon race at the 2005 World Championships in Athletics was held on 14 August in the streets of Helsinki with the goal line situated in the Helsinki Olympic Stadium. Paula Radcliffe set the pace of the race, leading all the way from start to finish. Constantina Tomescu was able to keep up with Radcliffe the longest, but began to fall behind after the 25 km mark and at the end found herself overtaken by the defending champion Catherine Ndereba.

== Medalists ==
Gold	(United Kingdom) Paula Radcliffe; Great Britain (GBR)
Silver	Catherine Ndereba; Kenya (KEN)
Bronze	Constantina Tomescu; Romania (ROM)

== Abbreviations ==
- All times shown are in hours:minutes:seconds

DNS	did not start
NM	no mark
WR	world record
AR	area record
NR	national record
PB	personal best
SB	season best

== Intermediates ==
Rank	Number	Athlete	Time
5 KILOMETRES
1	281	Paula Radcliffe (GBR)	16:47
2	423	Yumiko Hara (JPN)	16:47
3	207	Asha Gigi (ETH)	16:47
4	456	Catherine Ndereba (KEN)	16:50
5	214	Derartu Tulu (ETH)	16:50
10 KILOMETRES
1	281	Paula Radcliffe (GBR)	33:23
2	423	Yumiko Hara (JPN)	33:23
3	207	Asha Gigi (ETH)	33:23
4	601	Constantina Tomescu (ROM)	33:26
5	456	Catherine Ndereba (KEN)	33:26
15 KILOMETRES
1	281	Paula Radcliffe (GBR)	49:53
2	423	Yumiko Hara (JPN)	49:54
3	207	Asha Gigi (ETH)	49:54
4	601	Constantina Tomescu (ROM)	49:54
5	456	Catherine Ndereba (KEN)	49:56
20 KILOMETRES
1	281	Paula Radcliffe (GBR)	1:06:16
2	601	Constantina Tomescu (ROM)	1:06:17
3	450	Hellen Jemaiyo Kimutai (KEN)	1:06:18
4	456	Catherine Ndereba (KEN)	1:06:18
5	125	Zhou Chunxiu (CHN)	1:06:39
HALF MARATHON
1	281	Paula Radcliffe (GBR)	1:09:49
2	456	Catherine Ndereba (KEN)	1:09:52
3	450	Hellen Jemaiyo Kimutai (KEN)	1:09:52
4	601	Constantina Tomescu (ROM)	1:09:53
5	125	Zhou Chunxiu (CHN)	1:10:19
25 KILOMETRES
1	281	Paula Radcliffe (GBR)	1:22:47
2	601	Constantina Tomescu (ROM)	1:22:48
3	456	Catherine Ndereba (KEN)	1:22:50
4	450	Hellen Jemaiyo Kimutai (KEN)	1:23:00
5	125	Zhou Chunxiu (CHN)	1:23:42
30 KILOMETRES
1	281	Paula Radcliffe (GBR)	1:39:22
2	601	Constantina Tomescu (ROM)	1:39:33
3	456	Catherine Ndereba (KEN)	1:39:38
4	450	Hellen Jemaiyo Kimutai (KEN)	1:40:30
5	125	Zhou Chunxiu (CHN)	1:41:03
35 KILOMETRES
1	281	Paula Radcliffe (GBR)	1:56:14
2	456	Catherine Ndereba (KEN)	1:56:42
3	601	Constantina Tomescu (ROM)	1:56:59
4	450	Hellen Jemaiyo Kimutai (KEN)	1:58:29
5	125	Zhou Chunxiu (CHN)	1:58:35
40 KILOMETRES
1	281	Paula Radcliffe (GBR)	2:13:22
2	456	Catherine Ndereba (KEN)	2:14:09
3	601	Constantina Tomescu (ROM)	2:15:16
4	214	Derartu Tulu (ETH)	2:16:06
5	125	Zhou Chunxiu (CHN)	2:16:33

== Final ranking ==
Rank	Athlete	Time	Note
1st place, gold medalist(s)	Paula Radcliffe (GBR)	2:20:57	CR
2nd place, silver medalist(s)	Catherine Ndereba (KEN)	2:22:01	SB
3rd place, bronze medalist(s)	Constantina Diță (ROM)	2:23:19	
4	Derartu Tulu (ETH)	2:23:30	PB
5	Zhou Chunxiu (CHN)	2:24:12	
6	Yumiko Hara (JPN)	2:24:20	
7	Rita Jeptoo (KEN)	2:24:22	PB
8	Harumi Hiroyama (JPN)	2:25:46	
9	Hellen Jemaiyo Kimutai (KEN)	2:26:14	SB
10	Megumi Oshima (JPN)	2:26:29	
11	Madaí Pérez (MEX)	2:26:50	PB
12	Halina Karnatsevich (BLR)	2:27:14	PB
13	Dorota Gruca (POL)	2:27:46	PB
14	Jong Yong-Ok (PRK)	2:29:43	PB
15	Mari Ozaki (JPN)	2:30:28	
16	Asha Gigi (ETH)	2:30:38	
17	Ryoko Eda (JPN)	2:31:16	
18	Mara Yamauchi (GBR)	2:31:26	PB
19	Rosaria Console (ITA)	2:32:47	
20	Alina Ivanova (RUS)	2:32:53	
21	Aurica Buia (ROM)	2:33:20	PB
22	Shitaye Gemechu (ETH)	2:34:01	
23	Oh Song-Suk (PRK)	2:34:07	
24	Ryang Gum-Hwa (PRK)	2:34:35	
25	Hayley Haining (GBR)	2:34:41	PB
26	Turena Johnson-Lane (USA)	2:34:43	PB
27	Anna Pichrtová (CZE)	2:34:45	
28	Kirsten Melkevik Otterbu (NOR)	2:35:08	
29	Beatrice Omwanza (KEN)	2:35:48	
30	Jill Boaz (USA)	2:36:29	SB
31	Isabel Eizmendi (ESP)	2:36:41	
32	Ana Dias (POR)	2:36:50	
33	Shireen Crumpton (NZL)	2:37:03	PB
34	Irina Permitina (RUS)	2:38:16	
35	Emily Levan (USA)	2:38:32	PB
36	Jennifer Crain (USA)	2:39:02	SB
37	Dire Tune (ETH)	2:39:13	
38	Nadezhda Wijenberg (NED)	2:39:36	SB
39	Liza Hunter-Galvan (NZL)	2:39:47	
40	Tegla Loroupe (KEN)	2:39:58	
41	Nadia Ejjafini (BHR)	2:41:51	SB
42	Maija Oravamäki (FIN)	2:43:31	SB
43	Clarisse Rasoarizay (MAD)	2:43:58	SB
44	Oh Jung-hee (KOR)	2:47:42	
45	Rebecca Moore (NZL)	2:50:36	
46	Epiphanie Nyirabarame (RWA)	2:52:11	
47	Hafida Narmouch (MAR)	2:52:41	
48	Mulu Seboka (ETH)	2:53:08	
49	Nili Abramski (ISR)	2:54:08	
50	Mary Akor (USA)	2:57:18	
51	Mamokete Lechela (LES)	3:03:26	SB
DID NOT FINISH (DNF)
—	Debbie Mason (GBR)	DNF	
—	Kenza Wahbi (MAR)	DNF	
—	Fabiola William John (TAN)	DNF	
—	Kay Ulrich (NZL)	DNF	
—	Nuţa Olaru (ROM)	DNF	
—	Zhor El Kamch (MAR)	DNF	
DID NOT START (DNS)
—	Sandra Ruales (Ecuador)	DNS	
—	Agueda Amaral (TLS)	DNS	

== See also ==
- 2005 World Marathon Cup
