= Stine Larsen =

Stine Larsen may refer to:

- Stine Larsen (runner) (born 1975), Norwegian runner
- Stine Larsen (footballer) (born 1996), Danish footballer
