= 2002 Asian Athletics Championships – Women's 5000 metres =

The women's 5000 metres event at the 2002 Asian Athletics Championships was held in Colombo, Sri Lanka on 12 August.

== Results ==
Rank	Name	Nationality	Time	Notes
1st place, gold medalist(s)	Ham Bong-Sil	North Korea	15:42.88	PB
2nd place, silver medalist(s)	Akiko Kawashima	Japan	15:44.08	
3rd place, bronze medalist(s)	Mizuho Nasukawa	Japan	16:24.63	
4	Jo Bun-Hui	North Korea	16:41.43	PB
5	Beant Kaur	India	17:17.47	
6	Dalugoda Inoka	Sri Lanka	17:30.77	
7	Pushpa Devi	India	17:44.43	SB
8	H.M.W.K. Herath	Sri Lanka	18:51.01	PB
