= Constantina Diță =

Romanian long-distance runner

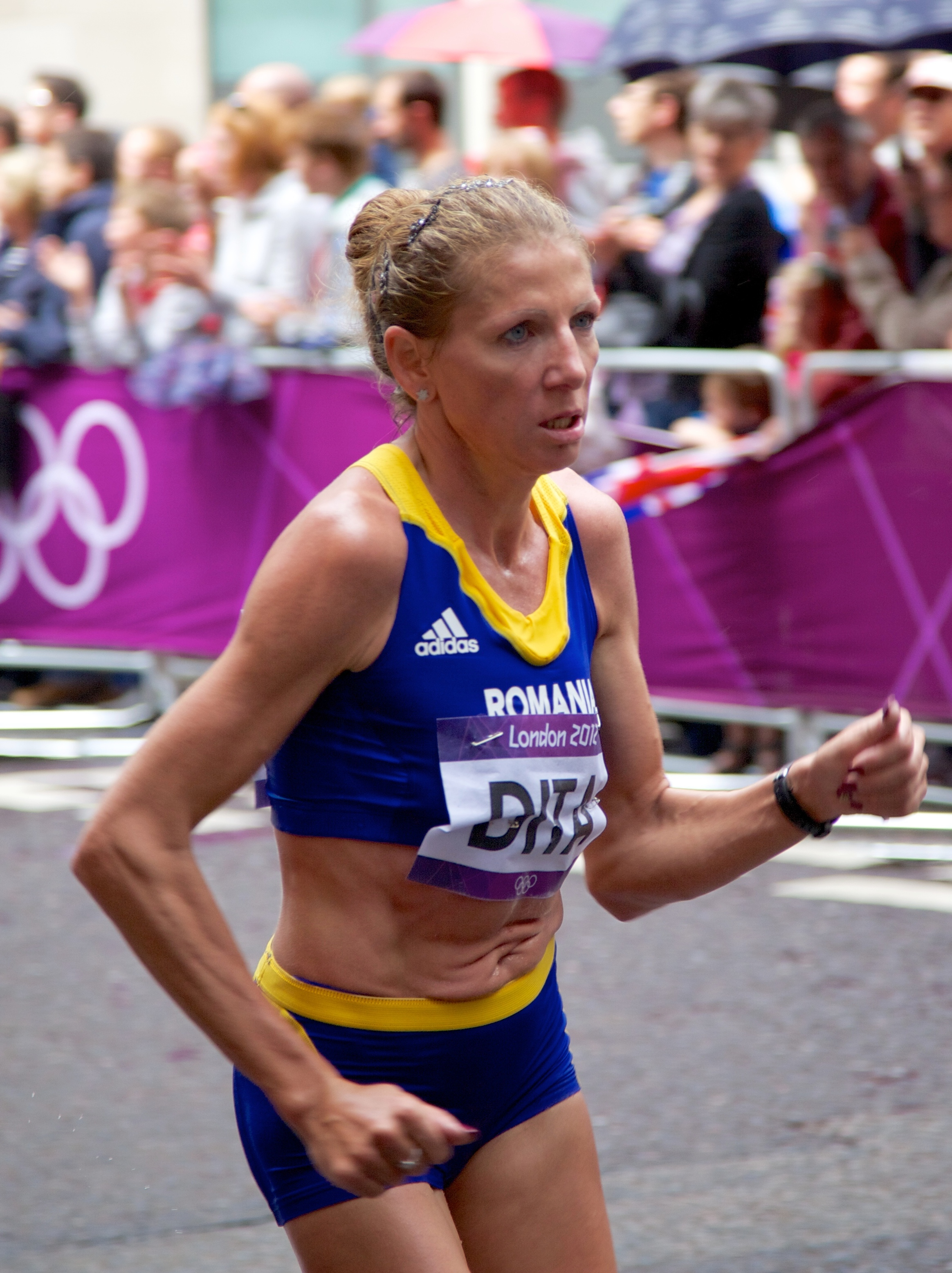
- Constantina Diță in 2012

Personal information
- Nationality: Romania
- Born: January 23, 1970 (age 56) Turburea, Romania
- Height: 1.60 m (5 ft 3 in)
- Weight: 48 kg (106 lb)

Sport
- Sport: Long-distance running
- Club: CS Pandurii Tg. Jiu
Medal record
Women's athletics
Representing Romania
Olympic Games
Gold medal – first place	2008 Beijing	Marathon
World Championships
Bronze medal – third place	2005 Helsinki	Marathon
World Half Marathon Championships
Gold medal – first place	2005 Edmonton	Individual
Gold medal – first place	2005 Edmonton	Team
Silver medal – second place	1998 Zürich	Team
Silver medal – second place	2004 Delhi	Team
Silver medal – second place	2006 Debrecen (20km)	Individual
Bronze medal – third place	2003 Vilamoura	Team
Bronze medal – third place	2004 Delhi	Individual
World Marathon Majors
Gold medal – first place	2004 Chicago	Marathon
Silver medal – second place	2003 Chicago	Marathon
Silver medal – second place	2005 London	Marathon
Silver medal – second place	2005 Chicago	Marathon
Bronze medal – third place	2004 London	Marathon
Bronze medal – third place	2007 London	Marathon

Constantina Diță (married Constantina Diță-Tomescu born on 23 January 1970, in Turburea, Gorj County), is a Romanian long-distance runner, who specializes mainly in the half marathon and marathon. She was the marathon gold medallist at the 2008 Beijing Olympics, having previously won a bronze medal at the 2005 World Championships in Athletics. She also represented her country at the Olympics in 2000 and 2004. She was named the BTA Best Balkan Athlete of the Year in 2008.

Diță has a marathon best of 2:21:30 hours. She was the champion at the 2005 IAAF World Half Marathon Championships – the first Romanian to win that honour. She was the 2004 Chicago Marathon winner.

== Career ==
As a child, Diță became interested in athletics and particularly admired Maricica Puică after seeing her win the 3000 metres gold at the 1984 Summer Olympics. Diță had her first successes at the 1999 European Cross Country Championships at which she won silver medals in the individual race and the team race with Romania. She began competing in the marathon and was tenth at the 2001 World Championships in Athletics. She ran in the Olympic marathon at the 2004 Summer Olympics in Athens (finishing twentieth) and went on to win the Chicago Marathon later that year, running a personal best of 2:21:30.

After winning the marathon bronze at the 2005 World Championships she became the World Half Marathon Champion. She won a silver medal at the 2006 IAAF World Road Running Championships and reached the podium of the 2007 London Marathon, taking third place.

Diță won the women's marathon at the 2008 Summer Olympics in 2 hours, 26 minutes and 44 seconds. At 38 years of age, she became the oldest Olympic marathon champion in history. Previously the oldest man to win an Olympic marathon was aged 37 and the oldest woman was aged 30. She lives and trains at altitude in Boulder, Colorado, and was married to her coach, Valeriu Tomescu, until they divorced in 2008.

Diță ran a marathon at the 2012 Summer Olympics and finished in 86th place.

== Personal bests ==
- 5000 metres – 15:28.91 min (2000)
- 10,000 metres – 31:49.47 min (2006)
- Half marathon – 1:08:07 hrs (2006)
- Marathon – 2:21:30 hrs (2005)

== International competitions ==
Year	Competition	Venue	Position	Event	Notes
Representing Romania
1998	World Cross Country Championships	Marrakesh, Morocco	16th	Short race	
1998	European Championships	Budapest, Hungary	17th	Marathon	2:34:35
1998	World Half Marathon Championships	Uster, Switzerland	29th	Half marathon	
1999	World Cross Country Championships	Belfast, United Kingdom	14th	Long race	
1999	World Cross Country Championships	Belfast, United Kingdom	11th	Short race	
1999	World Championships	Seville, Spain	19th	Marathon	
1999	World Half Marathon Championships	Palermo, Italy	12th	Half marathon	
1999	European Cross Country Championships	Velenje, Slovenia	2nd	Senior race	
1999	European Cross Country Championships	Velenje, Slovenia	2nd	Team race	
2000	World Cross Country Championships	Vilamoura, Portugal	35th	Long race	
2000	World Cross Country Championships	Vilamoura, Portugal	22nd	Short race	
2001	World Cross Country Championships	Ostend, Belgium	33rd	Long race	
2001	World Championships	Edmonton, Canada	10th	Marathon	2:30:38
2001	World Half Marathon Championships	Bristol, United Kingdom	32nd	Half marathon	
2002	European Championships	Munich, Germany	7th	10,000 m	
2002	World Half Marathon Championships	Brussels, Belgium	22nd	Half marathon	
2003	World Championships	Paris, France	DNF	Marathon	
2003	World Half Marathon Championships	Vilamoura, Portugal	5th	Half marathon	
2004	Summer Olympics	Athens, Greece	20th	Marathon	2:37:31
2004	World Half Marathon Championships	New Delhi, India	3rd	Half marathon	
2005	World Championships	Helsinki, Finland	3rd	Marathon	
2005	World Half Marathon Championships	Edmonton, Canada	1st	Half marathon	
2006	European Championships	Gothenburg, Sweden	11th	10,000 m	31:49.47 PB
2006	World Road Running Championships	Debrecen, Hungary	2nd	20 km	
2008	Summer Olympics	Beijing, China	1st	Marathon	2:26:44 SB
2012	Summer Olympics	London, United Kingdom	86th	Marathon	2:41:34 SB

== Marathons ==
Year	Competition	Venue	Position	Event	Notes
2001	Tokyo Marathon	Tokyo, Japan	4th	Marathon	2:26:39
2004	Chicago Marathon	Chicago, United States	1st	Marathon	2:21:30 PB
2007	London Marathon	London, United Kingdom	3rd	Marathon	2:23.55

== Awards ==
- Romanian sportsperson of the year: 2008
- BTA Best Balkan Athlete of the Year: 2008
- AIMS Best Marathon Runner Award: 2008
- National Sports Award: 2009
