= Kenza Wahbi =

Moroccan long-distance runner

Kenza Wahbi (born 4 February 1971) is a retired Moroccan long-distance runner who specialized in the marathon.

She was born in El Kelaa des Sraghna. She competed at the 2003 World Championships, the 2003 World Half Marathon Championships, the 2004 World Cross Country Championships, the 2004 Olympic Games, the 2004 World Half Marathon Championships, and the 2005 World Championships. Her best placement was 30th at the 2004 Olympics.

Her personal best times were 1:14:05 hours in the half marathon and 2:36:29 minutes in the marathon, both in 2003.

== Achievements ==
Year	Competition	Venue	Position	Event	Notes
Representing Morocco
2003	World Championships	Paris, France	35th	Marathon	2:36:29
2004	Olympic Games	Athens, Greece	30th	Marathon	2:41:36
2005	World Championships	Helsinki, Finland	—	Marathon	DNF
