= Luminița Talpoș =

Romanian long-distance runner

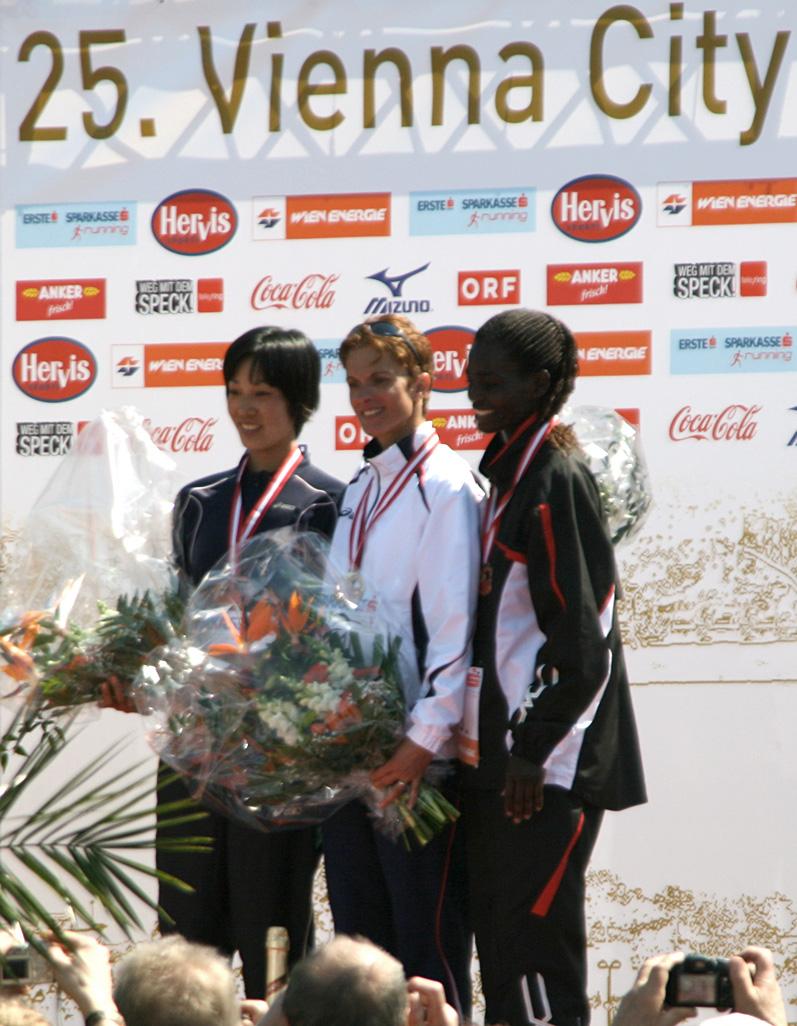
Talpoş (center) atop the podium at the 2008 Vienna City Marathon.

Luminiţa Talpoş (born 9 October 1972 in Craiova) is a female long-distance runner from Romania, who specialized in the marathon race during her career.

== Career ==
Talpoș set her personal best (2:26:43) in the women's marathon at the Vienna City Marathon on 27 April 2008.

== Achievements ==
Year	Competition	Venue	Position	Event	Notes
1999	World Cross Country Championships	Belfast, Northern Ireland	35th	Long race	29:49
1999	World Cross Country Championships	Belfast, Northern Ireland	83rd	Short race	17:39
1999	World Half Marathon Championships	Palermo, Italy	8th	Half Marathon	1:10:33
2002	World Half Marathon Championships	Brussels, Belgium	15th	Half marathon	1:10:08
2002	European Championships	Munich, Germany	16th	10,000 metres	32:30.48
2003	World Half Marathon Championships	Vilamoura, Portugal	15th	Half marathon	1:12:02
2003	World Championships	Paris, France	18th	Marathon	2:30:49
2004	World Half Marathon Championships	New Delhi, India	18th	Half marathon	1:14:25
2005	World Half Marathon Championships	Edmonton, Canada	27th	Half marathon	1:14:01
2006	World Road Running Championships	Debrecen, Hungary	16th	20 kilometres	1:07:11
2007	World Road Running Championships	Udine, Italy	4th	Half Marathon	1:09:01
2007	World Championships	Osaka, Japan	—	Marathon	DNF
2007	Vienna Marathon	Vienna, Austria	1st	Marathon	2:32:21
2008	World Half Marathon Championships	Rio de Janeiro, Brazil	9th	Half marathon	1:11:16
2008	Olympic Games	Beijing, PR China	18th	Marathon	2:31:41
2008	Vienna Marathon	Vienna, Austria	1st	Marathon	2:26:43
