= Naoko Sakamoto (runner) =

Japanese marathon runner (born 1980)

Personal information
- Born: 14 November 1980 (age 45) Nishinomiya, Hyōgo, Japan
- Height: 161 cm (5 ft 3 in)
- Weight: 44 kg (97 lb)

Sport
- Country: Japan
- Sport: Athletics
- Event: Marathon

Naoko Sakamoto (坂本 直子, Sakamoto Naoko; born 14 November 1980 in Nishinomiya) is a Japanese long-distance runner who specializes in the marathon race. In 2003, she finished 4th place in the women's marathon at the 2003 World Championships in Athletics held in Paris, France. In 2004, she was the winner of the Osaka Ladies Marathon and finished 7th place in the women's marathon at the 2004 Summer Olympics.

== Achievements ==
Year	Competition	Venue	Position	Event	Notes
Representing Japan
2003	World Championships	Paris, France	4th	Marathon	2:25:25
2004	Osaka Ladies Marathon	Osaka, Japan	1st	Marathon	2:25:29
2004	Olympic Games	Athens, Greece	7th	Marathon	2:31:43

=== Personal bests ===
- 5000 metres - 15:45.75 min (2002)
- 10,000 metres - 33:06.17 min (2003)
- Half marathon - 1:09:27 hrs (2001)
- Marathon - 2:21:51 hrs (2003)
