= Takami Ominami =

Japanese long-distance runner

Takami Ominami (大南 敬美, Ōminami Takami, born November 15, 1975) is a long-distance runner from Japan, whose main event is the marathon. She won the 2002 edition of the Rotterdam Marathon, clocking a personal best of 2:23:43. Ominami is one half of a world-record setting duo as she and her twin Hiromi (personal best 2:23:26) are the fastest marathoning sisters of all-time.

In 2001, she competed in the women's marathon at the 2001 World Championships in Athletics held in Edmonton, Alberta, Canada. She finished in 37th place.

== Achievements ==
- All results regarding marathon, unless stated otherwise

Year	Competition	Venue	Position	Notes
Representing Japan
2001	Nagoya Marathon	Nagoya, Japan	2nd	2:26:04
2001	World Championships	Edmonton, Canada	37th	2:42:25
2002	Rotterdam Marathon	Rotterdam, Netherlands	1st	2:23:43
2003	Nagoya Marathon	Nagoya, Japan	1st	2:25:03
2003	World Championships	Paris, France	27th	2:32:31
