= Nuța Olaru =

Romanian long-distance runner

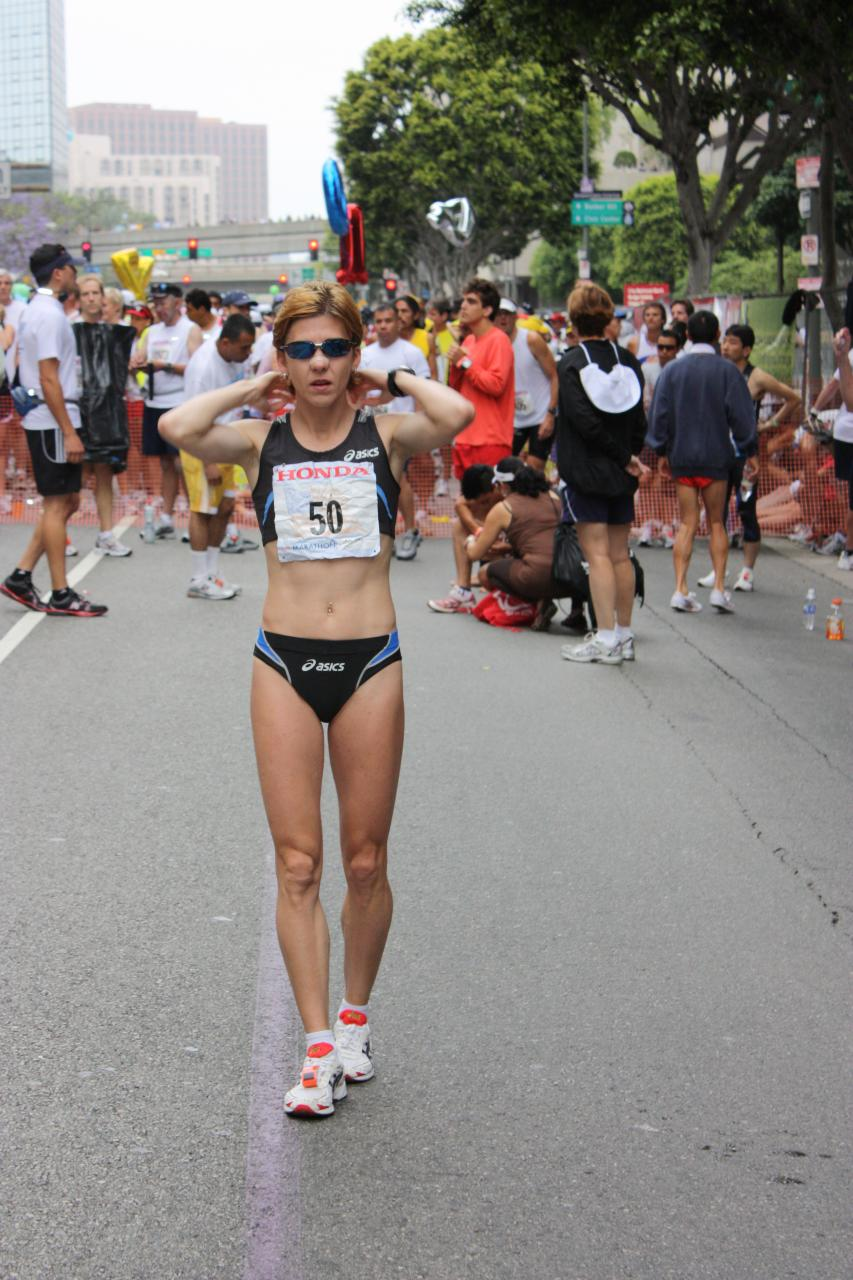
- Nuţa Olaru at 2009 LA Marathon

Personal information
- Born: August 28, 1970 (age 56) Orodel, Romania

Sport
- Sport: Marathon running

Nuța Olaru (born August 28, 1970) is a long-distance runner originally from Romania, who became a naturalized United States citizen in November 2012. She specializes in the marathon race. She set her personal best (2:24:33) in the women's marathon in Chicago, IL on October 10, 2004.

She won the Big Sur Marathon in 2012, 2013 and 2014, ran the 2013 Boston Marathon in 2:42:57 and the 2014 Boston Marathon in 2:37:29.

In April 2013, Olaru teamed up with the product development, ROLL Recovery, in Boulder, Colorado to help develop tools for runners.

== Achievements ==
Year	Competition	Venue	Position	Event	Notes
Representing Romania
1989	World Cross Country Championships	Stavanger, Norway	73rd	Junior race	17:29
1989	European Junior Championships	Varaždin, Yugoslavia	4th	1500 metres	4:14.82
1991	World Women's Road Race Championships	Nieuwegein, Netherlands	16th	15 kilometres	50:13
1991	World Women's Road Race Championships	Nieuwegein, Netherlands	2nd	Team competition	23 pts
1993	Universiade	Buffalo, United States	4th	Marathon	2:43:22
1995	Universiade	Fukuoka, Japan	5th	Marathon	3:03:28
1996	World Half Marathon Championships	Palma de Mallorca, Spain	4th	Half Marathon	1:11:07
1997	World Championships	Athens, Greece	30th	Marathon	2:47:12
1997	World Half Marathon Championships	Košice, Slovakia	5th	Half Marathon	1:09:52
1998	European Championships	Budapest, Hungary	34th	Marathon	2:42:44
1998	World Half Marathon Championships	Uster, Switzerland	–	Half Marathon	DNF
2000	Lille Half Marathon	Lille, France	1st	Half Marathon	1:11:08
2000	World Half Marathon Championships	Veracruz, Mexico	41st	Half Marathon	1:20:00
2001	World Championships	Edmonton, Canada	15th	Marathon	2:33:05
2001	World Half Marathon Championships	Bristol, United Kingdom	11th	Half Marathon	1:10:27
2002	European Championships	Munich, Germany	—	Marathon	DNF
2003	World Championships	Paris, France	11th	Marathon	2:28:24
2003	World Half Marathon Championships	Vilamoura, Portugal	23rd	Half Marathon	1:13:00
2004	Olympic Games	Athens, Greece	13th	Marathon	2:34:45
2005	World Championships	Helsinki, Finland	—	Marathon	DNF
2005	World Half Marathon Championships	Edmonton, Canada	8th	Half marathon	1:11:07
2007	World Championships	Osaka, Japan	—	Marathon	DNF
2009	World Championships	Berlin, Germany	60th	Marathon	3:00:59
2009	World Half Marathon Championships	Birmingham, England	48th	Half marathon	1:16:56
