= 2004 IAAF World Half Marathon Championships =

- Organisers: IAAF
- Edition: 13th
- Date: 3 October
- Host city: New Delhi, National Capital Territory, India
- Events: 2
- Participation: 152 athletes from 55 nations

The 13th IAAF World Half Marathon Championships was held on 3 October 2004 in New Delhi, India. A total of 152 athletes, 91 men and 61 women, from 55 countries took part.

Detailed reports on the event and an appraisal of the results were given both for the men's race and for the women's race.

Complete results were published for the men's race, for the women's race, for men's team, and for women's team.

The competition also incorporated the 1st Asian Half Marathon Championships. Abdullah Ahmed Hassan of Qatar and Sun Yingjie of China were the inaugural winners. The tournament has not been held since, however.

== Medallists ==
Event	Gold		Silver		Bronze	
Individual
Men	Paul Kirui (KEN)	1:02:15	Fabiano Joseph (TAN)	1:02:31	Ahmed Hassan Abdullah (QAT)	1:02:36
Women	Sun Yingjie (CHN)	1:08:40	Lydia Cheromei (KEN)	1:09:00	Constantina Diţă-Tomescu (ROU)	1:09:07
Team
Team Men	Kenya	3:07:55	Ethiopia	3:08:37	Uganda	3:13:48
Team Women	Ethiopia	3:36:00	Romania	3:36:08	Russia	3:38:21

== Race results ==
=== Men's ===
Rank	Athlete	Nationality	Time	Notes
1st place, gold medalist(s)	Paul Kirui	Kenya	1:02:15	
2nd place, silver medalist(s)	Fabiano Joseph	Tanzania	1:02:31	
3rd place, bronze medalist(s)	Ahmed Hassan Abdullah	Qatar	1:02:36	NR
4	John Cheruiyot Korir	Kenya	1:02:38	
5	Solomon Tsige	Ethiopia	1:02:42	
6	Alene Emere	Ethiopia	1:02:52	
7	Wilson Busienei	Uganda	1:02:55	PB
8	Wilson Kiprotich Kebenei	Kenya	1:03:02	
9	Berhanu Addane	Ethiopia	1:03:03	
10	Abebe Dinkessa	Ethiopia	1:04:06	
11	Yonas Kifle	Eritrea	1:04:19	
12	Ayele Setegne	Israel	1:04:41	
13	Martin Toroitich	Uganda	1:04:48	SB
14	Yukinobu Nakazaki	Japan	1:04:48	
15	Samson Kiflemariam	Eritrea	1:05:00	PB
16	Yoshinori Oda	Japan	1:05:03	
17	Terumasa Okamura	Japan	1:05:19	
18	Justin Young	United States	1:05:33	
19	Aziz Driouche	Morocco	1:05:41	
20	Lewis Masunda	Zimbabwe	1:05:42	
21	Tesfayohannes Mesfen	Eritrea	1:05:45	
22	Fernando Rey	Spain	1:05:51	
23	Moulay Ali Ouadih	France	1:05:59	
24	Larbi Zéroual	France	1:06:01	
25	Yevgeniy Rybakov	Russia	1:06:02	
26	Gabalebe Moloko	Botswana	1:06:04	
27	Joseph Nsubuga	Uganda	1:06:05	SB
28	Stephen Rogart	Tanzania	1:06:11	
29	Masatoshi Ibata	Japan	1:06:25	
30	Jumah Al-Noor	Qatar	1:06:42	
31	Jeroen van Damme	Netherlands	1:06:52	
32	Víctor Morente	Spain	1:06:56	
33	Leonid Shvetsov	Russia	1:06:58	
34	Rachid El-Ghanmouni	Morocco	1:07:01	
35	Aleksandr Vasilyev	Russia	1:07:05	
36	Eliphas Maiyo	Uganda	1:07:12	
37	Mohamed Serbouti	France	1:07:24	
38	Magnus Michelsson	Australia	1:07:41	
39	Yared Asmeron	Eritrea	1:07:48	
40	Hakim Bagy	France	1:07:49	
41	Carlos Jaramillo	Chile	1:07:51	
42	Nandana Ratnayake	Sri Lanka	1:08:00	
43	Foaad Abubaker	Qatar	1:08:13	
44	Ajith Bandara	Sri Lanka	1:08:25	
45	Oliver Dietz	Germany	1:08:29	
46	James Kibet	Uganda	1:08:36	
47	Josh Cox	United States	1:08:38	
48	Teddy Mitchell	United States	1:08:39	PB
49	Nick Cordes	United States	1:08:43	
50	Kabo Gabaseme	Botswana	1:09:00	
51	Menon Ramsamy	Mauritius	1:09:05	
52	Dhako Naftali	Tanzania	1:09:11	
53	Mikhail Khobotov	Russia	1:09:23	
54	Grigoriy Andreyev	Russia	1:09:37	
55	Kaelo Mosalagae	Botswana	1:10:10	PB
56	Sin Jung-Hoon	South Korea	1:10:12	
57	Stephen Drew	Canada	1:10:13	
58	Kevin Collins	United States	1:10:32	
59	Ram Bahadur Subha	India	1:10:33	
60	Slavko Petrović	Croatia	1:10:47	
61	Simon Labiche	Seychelles	1:10:52	
62	Tsotang Maine	Lesotho	1:11:08	
63	Sipho Dlamini	Swaziland	1:11:31	
64	Suliman Al-Ghodran	Jordan	1:11:41	
65	Muresh Kumar Yadav	India	1:11:53	
66	Ajith Singh	India	1:12:05	
67	Andrey Chigidinov	Kazakhstan	1:12:07	
68	José Alejandro Semprún	Venezuela	1:12:12	
69	Raj Kumar	India	1:12:12	
70	Yousef Al-Hadhrami	Oman	1:12:24	
71	Uttam Khatri	Nepal	1:12:29	
72	Mohan Chandr Kapri	India	1:12:49	
73	Rene Herrera	Philippines	1:15:06	
74	Arjun Prasad Dhakal	Nepal	1:16:16	
75	Marcel Tschopp	Liechtenstein	1:16:45	
76	Amnuay Tongmit	Thailand	1:17:29	
77	Mihail Faiskanov	Kyrgyzstan	1:18:37	
78	Pema Tshewang	Bhutan	1:18:45	PB
79	Hem Bunting	Cambodia	1:19:40	NR
80	Wong Wang Keung	Hong Kong	1:19:42	
81	Steve Osadiuk	Canada	1:21:26	
82	Nara Bahadur Khatri	Nepal	1:22:32	
83	Yac Aboub Abu Turkey	Palestine	1:22:59	
84	Hussein Riyaz	Maldives	1:25:19	
—	Franck de Almeida	Brazil	DNF	
—	Ieong Chio Wa	Macau	DNF	
—	Abdelhadi Habassa	Morocco	DNF	
—	Ridouane Harroufi	Morocco	DNF	
—	Javier Cortés	Spain	DNF	
—	Mohamed Msenduki Ikoki	Tanzania	DNF	
—	Kemal Tuvakuliyev	Turkmenistan	DNF	
—	Wai Kin Lok	Macau	DNS	
—	Nurridin Irmatov	Tajikistan	DNS	
—	Abdul Aziz Ali Ahmed	Yemen	DNS	

=== Women's ===
Rank	Athlete	Nationality	Time	Notes
1st place, gold medalist(s)	Sun Yingjie	China	1:08:40	NR
2nd place, silver medalist(s)	Lydia Cheromei	Kenya	1:09:00	PB
3rd place, bronze medalist(s)	Constantina Diţă-Tomescu	Romania	1:09:07	
4	Sonia O'Sullivan	Ireland	1:10:33	
5	Yuki Saito	Japan	1:11:05	
6	Eyerusalem Kuma	Ethiopia	1:11:07	
7	Irina Timofeyeva	Russia	1:11:17	
8	Bezunesh Bekele	Ethiopia	1:11:23	
9	Alina Ivanova	Russia	1:12:17	
10	Mihaela Botezan	Romania	1:12:36	
11	Gloria Marconi	Italy	1:12:42	
12	Zhou Chunxiu	China	1:12:52	
13	Kei Terada	Japan	1:13:07	
14	Rita Sitienei Jeptoo	Kenya	1:13:08	
15	Teyba Erkesso	Ethiopia	1:13:30	
16	Adanech Zekiros	Ethiopia	1:13:50	PB
17	Živilė Balčiūnaitė	Lithuania	1:13:53	
18	Luminița Talpoș	Romania	1:14:25	
19	Isabel Eizmendi	Spain	1:14:37	
20	Keiko Isogai	Japan	1:14:39	
21	Yelena Burykina	Russia	1:14:47	
22	Irina Safarova	Russia	1:14:52	
23	Patrizia Tisi	Italy	1:14:58	
24	Fatiha Klilech-Fauvel	France	1:15:05	
25	Aurica Buia	Romania	1:15:10	
26	Christelle Daunay	France	1:15:28	
27	María Luisa Lárraga	Spain	1:15:41	
28	Petra Kamínková/Drajzajtlová	Czech Republic	1:15:46	
29	Yamna Oubouhou	France	1:15:53	
30	Ivana Iozzia	Italy	1:15:59	
31	Fumi Murata	Japan	1:16:32	
32	Kenza Wahbi	Morocco	1:16:41	
33	Emily Nay	United States	1:17:09	
34	Vincenza Sicari	Italy	1:17:30	
35	Kimberly Fitchen-Young	United States	1:17:40	
36	Melissa White	United States	1:18:42	
37	Elena Fetizon	France	1:19:13	
38	Heather Tanner	United States	1:19:48	
39	Adriana da Silva	Brazil	1:19:49	
40	Maria Zambrano	Canada	1:21:41	
41	Irmalyn Falcón	Puerto Rico	1:21:58	
42	Sujeewa Jayasena	Sri Lanka	1:22:07	
43	Anastasiya Padalinskaya	Belarus	1:22:44	
44	Marina Gurbina	Kazakhstan	1:22:52	
45	Geeta Rani	India	1:22:59	PB
46	Sarita Marbade	India	1:23:23	PB
47	Purshot Laima Devi	India	1:24:38	
48	Pushpa Devi	India	1:24:44	
49	Saiphon Piawong	Thailand	1:25:20	NR
50	Ida Kiyindou	Congo	1:25:42	
51	Matirinta Mota	Lesotho	1:28:44	
52	Sarbjett Kaur	India	1:28:48	
53	Vivian Tang	Singapore	1:29:22	
54	Rashida Sarbasova	Kazakhstan	1:30:20	
55	Olesia Orlova	Kyrgyzstan	1:36:56	
56	Nirmala Bharati	Nepal	1:44:30	
57	Zulaikha Ali	Maldives	1:44:39	
58	Marina Tutynina	Turkmenistan	1:44:52	
—	Tenzin Yangdon	Bhutan	DNF	
—	Emily Kimuria	Kenya	DNF	
—	Hafida Izem	Morocco	DNF	

== Team results ==
=== Men's ===
Rank	Country	Team	Time
1st place, gold medalist(s)	Kenya	Paul Kirui; John Cheruiyot Korir; Wilson Kiprotich Kebenei	3:07:55
2nd place, silver medalist(s)	Ethiopia	Solomon Tsige; Alene Emere; Berhanu Addane	3:08:37
3rd place, bronze medalist(s)	Uganda	Wilson Busienei; Martin Toroitich; Joseph Nsubuga	3:13:48
4	Eritrea	Yonas Kifle; Samson Kiflemariam; Tesfayohannes Mesfen	3:15:04
5	Japan	Yukinobu Nakazaki; Yoshinori Oda; Terumasa Okamura	3:15:10
6	Qatar	Ahmed Hassan Abdullah; Jumah Al-Noor; Foaad Abubaker	3:17:31
7	Tanzania	Fabiano Joseph; Stephen Rogart; Dhako Naftali	3:17:53
8	France	Moulay Ali Ouadih; Larbi Zéroual; Mohamed Serbouti	3:19:24
9	Russia	Yevgeniy Rybakov; Leonid Shvetsov; Aleksandr Vasilyev	3:20:05
10	United States	Justin Young; Josh Cox; Teddy Mitchell	3:22:50
11	Botswana	Gabalebe Moloko; Kabo Gabaseme; Kaelo Mosalagae	3:25:14
12	India	Ram Bahadur Subha; Muresh Kumar Yadav; Ajith Singh	3:34:31
13	Nepal	Uttam Khatri; Arjun Prasad Dhakal; Nara Bahadur Khatri	3:51:17
—	Morocco	Aziz Driouche; Rachid El-Ghanmouni; Abdelhadi Habassa	DNF
—	Spain	Fernando Rey; Víctor Morente; Javier Cortés	DNF

=== Women's ===
Rank	Country	Team	Time
1st place, gold medalist(s)	Ethiopia	Eyerusalem Kuma; Bezunesh Bekele; Teyba Erkesso	3:36:00
2nd place, silver medalist(s)	Romania	Constantina Diţă-Tomescu; Mihaela Botezan; Luminița Talpoș	3:36:08
3rd place, bronze medalist(s)	Russia	Irina Timofeyeva; Alina Ivanova; Yelena Burykina	3:38:21
4	Japan	Yuki Saito; Kei Terada; Keiko Isogai	3:38:51
5	Italy	Gloria Marconi; Patrizia Tisi; Ivana Iozzia	3:43:39
6	France	Fatiha Klilech-Fauvel; Christelle Daunay; Yamna Oubouhou	3:46:26
7	United States	Emily Nay; Kimberly Fitchen-Young; Melissa White	3:53:31
8	India	Geeta Rani; Sarita Marbade; Purshot Laima Devi	4:11:00
—	Kenya	Lydia Cheromei; Rita Sitienei Jeptoo; Emily Kimuria	DNF

== Participation ==
The participation of 152 athletes (91 men/61 women) from 55 countries is reported. Although announced, athletes from Tajikistan and Yemen did not show.

- Australia (1)
- Belarus (1)
- Bhutan (2)
- Botswana (3)
- Brazil (2)
- Cambodia (1)
- Canada (3)
- Chile (1)
- China (2)
- Republic of the Congo (1)
- Croatia (1)
- Czech Republic (1)
- Eritrea (4)
- Ethiopia (8)
- France (8)
- Germany (1)
- Hong Kong (1)
- India (10)
- Ireland (1)
- Israel (1)
- Italy (4)
- Japan (8)
- Jordan (1)
- Kazakhstan (3)
- Kenya (6)
- Kyrgyzstan (2)
- Lesotho (2)
- Liechtenstein (1)
- Lithuania (1)
- Macau (1)
- Maldives (2)
- Mauritius (1)
- Morocco (6)
- Netherlands (1)
- Nepal (4)
- Oman (1)
- Palestine (1)
- Philippines (1)
- Puerto Rico (1)
- Qatar (3)
- Romania (4)
- Russia (9)
- Seychelles (1)
- Singapore (1)
- South Korea (1)
- Spain (5)
- Sri Lanka (3)
- Swaziland (1)
- Tanzania (4)
- Thailand (2)
- Turkmenistan (2)
- Uganda (5)
- United States (9)
- Venezuela (1)
- Zimbabwe (1)

== Asian Championships ==
Event	Gold		Silver		Bronze	
Men's individual	Abdullah Ahmed Hassan (QAT)	1:02:36	Yukinobu Nakazaki (JPN)	1:04:48	Yoshinori Oda (JPN)	1:05:03
Women's individual	Sun Yingjie (CHN)	1:08:40	Yuki Saito (JPN)	1:11:05	Zhou Chunxiu (CHN)	1:12:52
Men's team	Japan (JPN)	3:15:10	Qatar (QAT)	3:17:31	India (IND)	3:34:31
Women's team	Japan (JPN)	3:38:51	India (IND)	4:11:00	Only two teams competed	

== See also ==
- 2004 in athletics (track and field)
