= 2005 Asian Athletics Championships – Women's 10,000 metres =

The women's 10,000 metres event at the 2005 Asian Athletics Championships was held in Incheon, South Korea on September 1.

== Results ==
Rank	Name	Nationality	Time	Notes
1st place, gold medalist(s)	Bai Xue	China	33:34.74	
2nd place, silver medalist(s)	Yumi Sato	China	33:42.11	
3rd place, bronze medalist(s)	Ham Bong-Sil	North Korea	34:35.30	SB
4	Choi Kyung-Hee	South Korea	35:07.17	
5	Chen Xiaofang	South Korea	35:23.56	PB
6	Ro Un-Ok	North Korea	36:08.47	
7	Lee Sun-young	South Korea	36:08.78	
8	Mercedita Manipol	Philippines	36:48.87	
9	Aruna Devi	India	37:44.68	
10	Tharanga Jayasekara	Sri Lanka	37:57.19	SB
