= Athletics at the 1993 Summer Universiade – Women's marathon =

The women's marathon event at the 1993 Summer Universiade was held in Buffalo, United States in July 1993.

== Results ==
Rank	Athlete	Nationality	Time	Notes
1st place, gold medalist(s)	Noriko Kawaguchi	Japan	2:37:47	
2nd place, silver medalist(s)	Franca Fiacconi	Italy	2:38:44	
3rd place, bronze medalist(s)	Nao Otani	Japan	2:40:17	
4	Nuța Olaru	Romania	2:43:22	
5	Alison Rose	Great Britain	2:46:09	
6	Gergana Voynova	Bulgaria	2:50:17	
7	María Isabel Martínez	Spain	2:57:24	
8	Isabel Tum	Guatemala	3:09:58	
9	Lee Hsiao-chuan	Chinese Taipei	3:10:06	
