= Sandy Jacobson =

Canadian long-distance runner

Personal information
- Born: 23 March 1966 (age 59)

Sport
- Country: Canada
- Sport: Long-distance running

Sandy Jacobson (born 23 March 1966) is a Canadian long-distance runner. In 2001, she competed in the women's marathon at the 2001 World Championships in Athletics held in Edmonton, Alberta, Canada. She finished in 34th place.

In 2003, she competed in the women's marathon at the 2003 World Championships in Athletics held in Paris, France. She finished in 28th place.
