= Beatriz Ros =

Spanish long-distance runner

Personal information
- Nationality: Spanish
- Born: 12 May 1974 (age 52) Madrid, Spain

Sport
- Sport: Long-distance running
- Event: Marathon

Beatriz Ros (born 12 May 1974) is a Spanish long-distance runner. She competed in the women's marathon at the 2004 Summer Olympics held in Athens, Greece. She finished in 32nd place.

In 2003, she competed in the women's marathon at the 2003 World Championships in Athletics held in Paris, France. She finished in 13th place.
