= John Yuda Msuri =

Tanzanian long-distance runner

John Yuda Msuri (born June 9, 1979 in Dodoma) is a Tanzanian long-distance runner.

== Achievements ==
Year	Competition	Venue	Position	Event	Notes
Representing Tanzania
2003	World Half Marathon Championships	Vilamoura, Portugal	5th	Half Marathon	1:01:13
2005	World Half Marathon Championships	Edmonton, Canada	6th	Half Marathon	1:02:11

- 2002 World Half Marathon Championships – bronze medal
- 2002 World Cross Country Championships – silver medal (long race)
- 2002 Commonwealth Games – bronze medal (10,000 m)
- 2001 World Half Marathon Championships – bronze medal
- 2001 East African Championships – gold medal (10,000 m)
