= Gloria Marconi =

Italian long-distance runner

Personal information
- Nationality: Italian
- Born: March 31, 1968 (age 58) Florence, Italy

Sport
- Country: Italy
- Sport: Athletics
- Event: Marathon

Achievements and titles
- Personal best: Half marathon: 1:09.25 (2003)

Gloria Marconi (born 31 March 1968) is an Italian long-distance runner.

== Biography ==
Gloria Marconi was born in Florence, Italy on 31 March 1968. On the track she finished fifth in the 5000 metres and 24th in the 10,000 metres at the 2002 European Athletics Championships. She became Italian 5000 metres champion in 2002 and 2004, and 10,000 metres champion in 2003 and 2006. She became indoor 3000 metres champion in 2002.

Her personal best times were 4:25.85 minutes in the 1500 metres, achieved in 1998; 9:04.80 minutes in the 3000 metres, achieved in July 2004 in Ferrara; 10:27.72 minutes in the 3000 metres steeplechase, achieved in July 2001 in Catania; 15:31.02 minutes in the 5000 metres, achieved in July 2004 in Florence; and 32:28.65 minutes in the 10,000 metres, achieved in April 2003 in Athens.

She had a greater success in road running. In the half marathon she competed at the 2001 and 2002 World Half Marathon Championships, and finished eleventh at the 2004 World Half Marathon Championships. Marconi took back-to-back victories at the Roma-Ostia Half Marathon in 2002 and 2003. As a debutant in the marathon race she won the 2003 edition of the Rome Marathon. She finished 42nd in this event at the 2003 World Championships, and second in the 2004 Milano City Marathon. In 2006, she finished 26th at the inaugural World Road Running Championships.

After a long competitive break, she completed her first marathon since 2006 at the 2011 Florence Marathon, taking third place in a time of 2:34:57 hours at the age of 43.

Her personal best times on the road are 1:09:25 hours in the half marathon, achieved in October 2006 in Ostia; and 2:29:35 hours in the marathon, achieved in March 2003 in Rome.

== National titles ==
She has won 6 times the individual national championship.

- 2 wins in the 5000 metres (2002, 2004)
- 3 wins in the 10,000 metres (2003, 2006, 2007)
- 1 win in the half marathon (2006)

== See also ==
- Italian Athletics Championships
- Italian all-time lists – Half marathon
