= Atsushi Sato =

Japanese long-distance runner (born 1978)

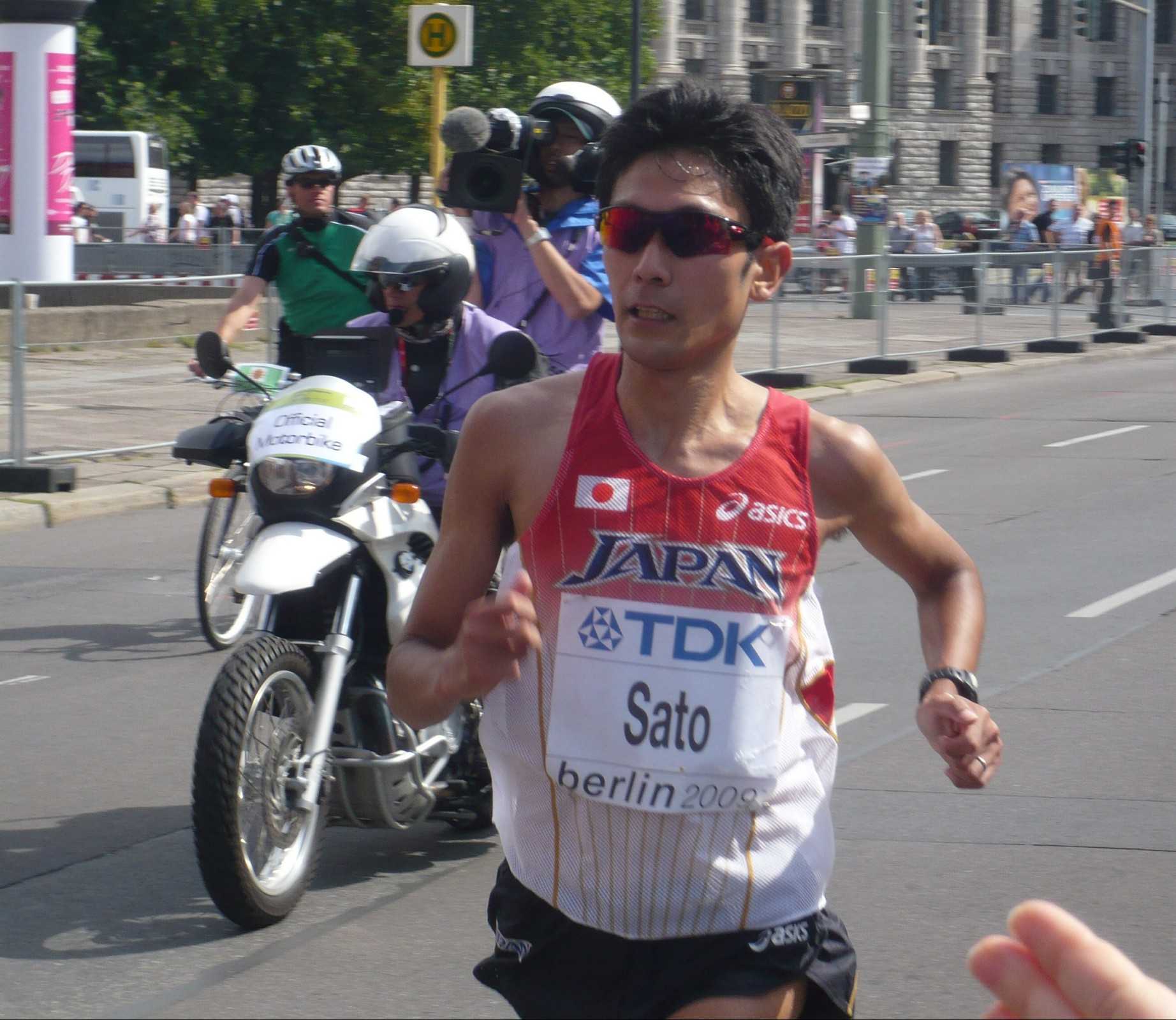
Sato at the 2009 World Championships in Berlin

Atsushi Sato (佐藤 敦之, Satō Atsushi; born 8 May 1978) is a Japanese long-distance runner who competes in marathon races. He is the Asian record holder in the half marathon with his time of 60:25 minutes. His marathon best of 2:07:13 hours is the fourth fastest by a Japanese athlete. He is married to Miho Sato (née Sugimori), who was a 2004 Japanese Olympian.

At major championships, he has twice finished in the top ten in the marathon at the World Championships in Athletics, including sixth at the 2009 World Championships marathon. He has also had two top ten finishes at the IAAF World Half Marathon Championships. He represented Japan at the 2008 Beijing Olympics, but was last in the marathon. He also competed for Japan in the 10,000 metres at the 2002 Asian Games.

== Career ==
Sato began running at an early age and represented his junior and senior high schools in Aizuwakamatsu in the 1500 metres and 5000 metres. He entered higher education at Waseda University and began running over longer distance while there. He made his debut in the marathon at the 2000 Lake Biwa Marathon and he came fourth in a time of 2:09:50 hours, which made him the fastest ever Japanese collegiate runner at that time. On his second outing at the 2001 Fukuoka Marathon he was less successful, as he finished out of contention in eleventh place.

He did not run over the distance in 2002 and entered shorter races instead. He was fourth at the Yamaguchi half marathon (setting a best of 61:53 minutes), then led the Japanese team to the team silver at the 2002 IAAF World Half Marathon Championships, taking eighth in another personal best of 61:37 minutes. Returning to Japan he set a 5000 m best of 13:37.97 to win at the Nobeoka Golden Games. At the Japanese Track and Field Championships he was the runner-up in the 10,000 metres and subsequently represented Japan at the 2002 Asian Games, taking sixth place.

Sato returned to the marathon in 2003 and gained selection for the World team via a personal best run of 2:08:50 minutes at the Lake Biwa Marathon (he was fifth and the third fastest Japanese). He placed third at the Sapporo Half Marathon in July and was tenth in the marathon at the 2003 World Championships in Athletics in Paris. He set a series of personal bests in 2004: 8:00.83 minutes for the 3000 metres, 13:33.62 minutes at the Oda Memorial 5000 m, 2:08:36 hours in the marathon (fourth in Lake Biwa), and finally a 10,000 metres best of 27:56.86 min in Niigata. He did not gain selection for the 2004 Olympic team. He performed to a lower standard in 2005, having seasonal highlights of a fifth-place finish in the 10,000 m Japanese trials and 16th at the Chicago Marathon. His 2006 was worse, as his only major competition was the Lake Biwa Marathon and he failed to finish the race.

The 2007 season saw Sato achieve a career peak. He was the runner-up behind Atsushi Fujita at the Beppu-Ōita Marathon. He was one second off his best at the Sapporo Half Marathon, taking third on the podium. At the 2007 IAAF World Road Running Championships he broke the Asian record for the half marathon with a time of 1:00:25 hours. This brought him ninth place overall, but he was one of only two non-African-born runners to finish in the top ten (alongside Marilson dos Santos). At the end of the year he was the first Japanese runner home at the Fukuoka Marathon and his run of 2:07:13 hours for third place made him the fourth fastest Japanese marathoner ever and gained him a spot on the Olympic team.

In spite of a strong previous year, he managed only sixth at the Good Luck Beijing test event marathon (with a time of 2:23:50 hours) and was the last runner to finish in the 2008 Olympic marathon, which took him 2:41:08 hours to complete the course. In 2009 he was runner-up at the Japanese Corporate Team Half Marathon Championships with a time of 1:01:29 hours (the second best of his career) and was eighth at the 2009 London Marathon with a run of 2:09:16 hours. He was the best non-African performer in the marathon at the 2009 World Championships in Athletics, taking sixth place in the rankings. He ran at the 2009 IAAF World Half Marathon Championships, but managed only 32nd place overall. Sato was the fastest on his 10K leg of the International Chiba Ekiden and helped Japan win the title in the ekiden relay event.

Sato began 2010 at the New Year Ekiden and he moved his team, Chugoku Electric, up in the rankings by winning his 22.3 km stage. The following month he came third at the Tokyo Marathon in February 2010 in very cold conditions. He missed the rest of the 2010 running season due to injury and tried a comeback at the 2011 Chicago Marathon, but did not finish. He struggled in the 23 km stage of the 2012 New Year Ekiden and subsequently missed races due to injury.

== Personal bests ==
- 5000 metres – 13:33.62 min (2004)
- 10,000 metres – 27:56.86 min (2004)
- Half marathon – 1:00:25 hrs (2007)
- Marathon – 2:07:13 (2007)
