= Ham Bong-sil =

North Korean long-distance runner

- Hangul: 함봉실
- RR: Ham Bongsil
- MR: Ham Pongsil

Ham Bong-sil
Medal record

Women's athletics

Representing North Korea

Asian Championships
Gold medal – first place	2002 Colombo	5000 m
Gold medal – first place	2002 Colombo	10,000 m
Bronze medal – third place	2005 Incheon	10,000 m

Ham Pong-sil (born 24 July 1974) is a North Korean long-distance runner who specializes in the marathon race.

She is a three-time Pyongyang Marathon winner (2002, 2003, 2005).

After the Paris World Championships in 2003, she was appointed to a post in charge of track and field coaching in North Korea. She trained O Song Mi, among others.

== Achievements ==
Year	Competition	Venue	Position	Event	Notes
Representing North Korea
2000	Olympic Games	Sydney, Australia	8th	Marathon	2:27:07
2001	Pyongyang Marathon	Pyongyang, North Korea	2nd	Marathon	2:29:44
2001	Universiade	Beijing, China	1st	Half marathon	1:15:24
2002	Pyongyang Marathon	Pyongyang, North Korea	1st	Marathon	2:26:23
2002	Asian Championships	Colombo, Sri Lanka	1st	5000 m	15:42.88
2002	Asian Championships	Colombo, Sri Lanka	1st	10,000 m	34:44.92
2002	Asian Games	Busan, South Korea	1st	Marathon	2:33:35
2003	Pyongyang Marathon	Pyongyang, North Korea	1st	Marathon	2:27:48
2003	World Championships	Paris, France	5th	Marathon	2:25:31 = PB
2004	Olympic Games	Athens, Greece	—	Marathon	DNF
2005	Pyongyang Marathon	Pyongyang, North Korea	1st	Marathon	2:31:46
2005	Asian Championships	Incheon, South Korea	3rd	10,000 m	34:35.30

=== Personal bests ===
- 5000 metres - 15:37.5 min (2002) - national record.
- 10,000 metres - 34:35.30 min (2005)
- Half marathon - 1:12:47 hrs (2003)
- Marathon - 2:25:31 hrs (2003) - national record.
