= Marlene Fortunato =

Brazilian long-distance runner (born 1970)

Personal information
- Nationality: Brazilian
- Born: 8 January 1970 (age 56)

Sport
- Sport: Long-distance running
- Event: Marathon

Achievements and titles
- Olympic finals: Women's marathon at the 2004 Summer Olympics

Marlene Fortunato (born 8 January 1970) is a Brazilian long-distance runner. She competed in the women's marathon at the 2004 Summer Olympics.
