= Li Helan =

Chinese long-distance runner

Personal information
- Nationality: Chinese
- Born: 2 January 1978 (age 47)

Sport
- Sport: Long-distance running
- Event: Marathon

Li Helan (born 2 January 1978) is a Chinese long-distance runner. She competed in the women's marathon at the 2004 Summer Olympics.
