= Asha Gigi =

Ethiopian long-distance runner

Asha Gigi Roba (born 15 October 1973) is an Ethiopian long-distance runner who specialises in the marathon. Her personal best of 2:26:05 hours was set in 2004 at the Paris Marathon, where she came second. She represented Ethiopia in the event at the 2004 Summer Olympics and the World Championships in Athletics (2003 and 2005). She has won the Toronto Waterfront Marathon and the Florence Marathon.

In her early career in the 1990s she won team medals with Ethiopia at the IAAF World Cross Country Championships and the World Road Relay Championships.

== Career ==
Born in Arsi in Ethiopia's Oromia Region, she started her career as a cross country runner. In 1994 she won a silver medal as part of the Ethiopian women's team at the IAAF World Road Relay Championships. She also won a team silver medal at the 1994 IAAF World Cross Country Championships, through a 19th-place finish in the long race. She was selected for the national team at the 1996 IAAF World Cross Country Championships, but came 43rd overall on that occasion. In 1998 she helped the Ethiopian women to the gold medals at the World Relay Championships, came 36th at the 1998 World Cross Country, and was 19th at the 1998 IAAF World Half Marathon Championships.

After coming 32nd and 28th at the 1999 and 2000 World Cross Country events, she began to compete more in road and track competitions. She won the Phoenix 10K race in 1999. At the 2002 African Championships in Athletics she was fourth in the 10,000 metres race and placed 17th at the 2002 IAAF World Half Marathon Championships. The following year she had her best finish at the World Cross Country event, taking tenth place in the women's long race as the fifth Ethiopian woman to finish is a near medal sweep.

Asha Gigi made her debut over the marathon distance in 2003 at the San Diego Marathon, where her time of 2:31:39 hours earned her a place for the national team. At the 2003 World Championships in Athletics in Paris she came 19th and was part of the Ethiopian silver medal-winning team in the IAAF World Marathon Cup competition. The year after she was a lowly tenth at the Osaka Ladies Marathon but then made a breakthrough at the Paris Marathon, setting a personal best time of 2:26:02 hours to finish runner-up to Salina Kosgei. She had her first Olympic selection, but did not manage to finish the marathon at the 2004 Athens Olympics. She also ran at the 2004 New York City Marathon, but managed only 13th place.

She ran in Paris for a third year running in 2005 and came third in her second fastest time (2:27:41 hours). Her third consecutive national selection saw her give her career best finish on the global stage, as she came 16th in the marathon at the 2005 World Championships in Athletics in Helsinki. She had a poor run at the Singapore Marathon in December (2:46:14 hours) but returned to form in Paris in 2006 with a run of 2:32:35 hours for seventh place. She was fourth at that year's Berlin Marathon (2:32:32) and was a late leader at the Tokyo Ladies Marathon, but failed to finish the race.

She recorded her third career sub-2:30 marathon in Paris in 2007 and her time of 2:29:11 hours brought her fourth place. Her first ever victory over the distance came at the Toronto Waterfront Marathon where, in spite of a fast early pace, she went on to break the course record with her time 2:33:15 hours. The 2008 season was one of her most successful: she ran her third fastest ever time (2:28:24) at the Dubai Marathon, taking sixth place, was third at the Hamburg Marathon in another sub-2:30 clocking, then was runner-up in her attempted defence at the Toronto Waterfront Marathon. She also won the Prague Half Marathon

Her sole outing of 2009 was in Dubai, where she came 11th overall. After a break from running in 2010, she came sixth at the Xiamen International Marathon. Asha Gigi won the second marathon of her career at the 2011 Florence Marathon, beating all opposition in a time of 2:31:36 hours.

== Achievements ==
Year	Competition	Venue	Position	Notes
Representing Ethiopia
1994	World Cross Country Championships	Budapest, Hungary	19th	Long race
1994	World Cross Country Championships	Budapest, Hungary	2nd	Team competition
1998	World Half Marathon Championships	Uster, Switzerland	19th	Half marathon
2002	World Half Marathon Championships	Brussels, Belgium	17th	Half marathon
2002	African Championships	Radès, Tunisia	4th	10,000 m
2003	World Cross Country Championships	Lausanne, Switzerland	10th	Long race
2003	World Championships	Paris, France	19th	Marathon
2004	Olympic Games	Athens, Greece	DNF	Marathon
2005	World Championships	Helsinki, Finland	16th	Marathon
2007	Toronto Waterfront Marathon	Toronto, Canada	1st	Marathon

=== Personal bests ===
- 5000 metres – 15:37.38 min (1999)
- 10,000 metres – 31:48.31 min (2003)
- Half marathon – 1:10:27 min (2005)
- Marathon – 2:26:05 min (2004)
