= Miguel Mallqui =

Peruvian long-distance runner

Personal information
- Nationality: Peruvian
- Born: 10 December 1971 (age 53)

Sport
- Sport: Long-distance running
- Event: Marathon

Miguel Mallqui (born 10 December 1971) is a Peruvian long-distance runner. He competed in the men's marathon at the 1996 Summer Olympics.
