= Athletics at the 2004 Summer Olympics – Women's marathon =

Women's marathon at the Games of the XXVIII Olympiad
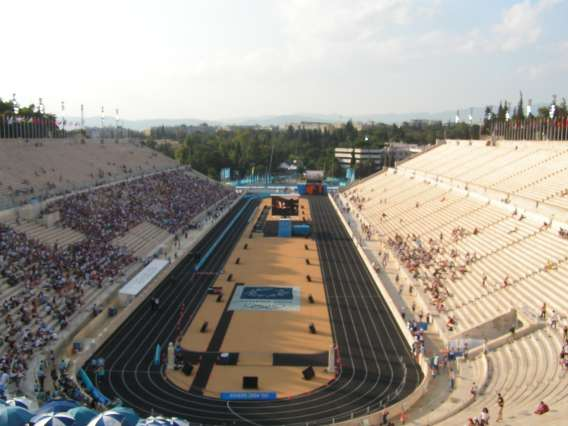
- Panathinaiko
- Venue: Marathon to Athens, Greece
- Dates: 22 August
- Competitors: 82 from 46 nations
- Winning time: 2:26:20

Medalists
| 1st place, gold medalist(s) | | Mizuki Noguchi | Japan |
| 2nd place, silver medalist(s) | | Catherine Ndereba | Kenya |
| 3rd place, bronze medalist(s) | | Deena Kastor | United States |

The women's marathon at the 2004 Summer Olympics took place on August 22 in the streets of Athens, Greece. These streets were recently painted for the event, which provided an excellent road surface for the athletes. Drawing upon the ancient origins of the race, the marathon began in Marathon, Greece, and eventually ended at Panathinaiko Stadium, the venue previously used for the 1896 Athens Olympics.

The 42.195 kilometre (26.2 mile) journey began in Marathon and the race over the classic course began with temperatures exceeding 35 °C (95 °F). The top contenders all found themselves in a large leading group that held a modest pace through the half marathon. A few tried to surge ahead, but a pack of five runners had been separated from the rest of the field to maintain at the front as they passed the 20k mark.

World record holder Paula Radcliffe of Great Britain, who started out as a pre-race favorite coming into the Games, raised the tempo taking four others, including the Japanese duo Mizuki Noguchi and Reiko Tosa, with her to the front. Past 25k, Radcliffe struggled to keep her pace on an uphill stretch of the course and fell behind, leaving the two runners Noguchi and Ethiopia's Elfenesh Alemu to chase into the front with only half a minute apart from each other. At around 35k, Radcliffe launched a brave charge to recover her pace and challenge the leaders into the medal position, until Kenya's Catherine Ndereba managed to overtake her. Distraught and sobbing, Radcliffe tried to restart with 6k left to the finish, but then slumped on the roadside and quit the race, citing pre-race nutrition problems and injuries for her disappointing performance.

Heading to the Panathinaiko Stadium, Noguchi continued to escalate her lead, and edged past the late-charging Ndereba by twelve seconds to win the Olympic gold medal in 2:26:20. Noguchi's victory also marked the second consecutive gold for Japan in the women's marathon with Naoko Takahashi claiming the event in Sydney four years earlier.

Meanwhile, Deena Kastor of the United States came from behind to easily surpass the fading Alemu, and earn the first Olympic medal by an American female in the event since 1984.

Among the 82 starters, only sixty-six were able to successfully finish the race, with two left the track seeking for a medical attention.

== Records ==
Prior to the competition, the existing World and Olympic records were as follows:

| World record | Paula Radcliffe (GBR) | 2:15:25 | London, United Kingdom | 13 April 2003 |
| Olympic record | Naoko Takahashi (JPN) | 2:23:14 | Sydney, Australia | 24 September 2000 |

No new records were set during the competition.

== Qualification ==
The qualification period for athletics was 1 January 2003 to 9 August 2004. For the men's marathon, each National Olympic Committee was permitted to enter up to three athletes that had run the race in 2:37:00 or faster during the qualification period. If an NOC had no athletes that qualified under that standard, one athlete that had run the race in 2:42:00 or faster could be entered.

== Schedule ==
All times are Greece Standard Time (UTC+2)

| Date | Time | Round |
|---|---|---|
| Sunday, 22 August 2004 | 18:00 | Final |

== Results ==
| Rank | Name | Nationality | Result | Notes |
|---|---|---|---|---|
| 1st place, gold medalist(s) | Mizuki Noguchi | Japan | 2:26:20 | |
| 2nd place, silver medalist(s) | Catherine Ndereba | Kenya | 2:26:32 | |
| 3rd place, bronze medalist(s) | Deena Kastor | United States | 2:27:20 | SB |
| 4 | Elfenesh Alemu | Ethiopia | 2:28:15 | |
| 5 | Reiko Tosa | Japan | 2:28:44 | |
| 6 | Olivera Jevtić | Serbia and Montenegro | 2:31:15 | |
| 7 | Naoko Sakamoto | Japan | 2:31:43 | |
| 8 | Lyudmila Petrova | Russia | 2:31:56 | |
| 9 | Svetlana Zakharova | Russia | 2:32:04 | |
| 10 | Bruna Genovese | Italy | 2:32:50 | |
| 11 | Alice Chelangat | Kenya | 2:33:52 | |
| 12 | Zhang Shujing | China | 2:34:34 | |
| 13 | Nuța Olaru | Romania | 2:34:45 | |
| 14 | Živilė Balčiūnaitė | Lithuania | 2:35:01 | |
| 15 | Corinne Raux | France | 2:35:54 | |
| 16 | Rosaria Console | Italy | 2:35:56 | |
| 17 | Małgorzata Sobańska | Poland | 2:36:43 | |
| 18 | Luminița Zaituc | Germany | 2:36:45 | |
| 19 | Lee Eun-jung | South Korea | 2:37:23 | |
| 20 | Constantina Diţă | Romania | 2:37:31 | |
| 21 | Jong Yong-ok | North Korea | 2:37:52 | |
| 22 | Li Helan | China | 2:37:53 | |
| 23 | Chung Yun-hee | South Korea | 2:38:57 | |
| 24 | Stine Larsen | Norway | 2:39:55 | |
| 25 | Liz Yelling | Great Britain | 2:40:13 | |
| 26 | María Abel | Spain | 2:40:13 | |
| 27 | Hafida Izem | Morocco | 2:40:46 | |
| 28 | Anna Pichrtová | Czech Republic | 2:40:58 | |
| 29 | Tracey Morris | Great Britain | 2:41:00 | |
| 30 | Kenza Wahbi | Morocco | 2:41:36 | |
| 31 | Kerryn McCann | Australia | 2:41:41 | |
| 32 | Beatriz Ros | Spain | 2:41:51 | |
| 33 | Zhou Chunxiu | China | 2:42:54 | |
| 34 | Jennifer Rhines | United States | 2:43:52 | |
| 35 | Choi Gyeong-hui | South Korea | 2:44:05 | |
| 36 | Sandra Ruales | Ecuador | 2:44:28 | |
| 37 | María Dolores Pulido | Spain | 2:44:33 | |
| 38 | Margarita Tapia | Mexico | 2:46:14 | |
| 39 | Colleen de Reuck | United States | 2:46:30 | |
| 40 | Albina Ivanova | Russia | 2:47:23 | |
| 41 | Grażyna Syrek | Poland | 2:47:26 | |
| 42 | Nili Abramski | Israel | 2:48:08 | |
| 43 | Clarisse Rasoarizay | Madagascar | 2:48:14 | |
| 44 | Jane Salumäe | Estonia | 2:48:47 | |
| 45 | Simona Staicu | Hungary | 2:48:57 | |
| 46 | Angélica Sánchez | Mexico | 2:49:04 | |
| 47 | Helena Sampaio | Portugal | 2:49:18 | |
| 48 | Beáta Rakonczai | Hungary | 2:49:41 | |
| 49 | Annemette Jensen | Denmark | 2:50:01 | |
| 50 | Georgia Abatzidou | Greece | 2:50:01 | |
| 51 | Liza Hunter-Galvan | New Zealand | 2:50:23 | |
| 52 | Hafida Gadi | France | 2:50:29 | |
| 53 | Gulsara Dadabaeva | Tajikistan | 2:50:45 | |
| 54 | Epiphanie Nyirabarame | Rwanda | 2:52:50 | SB |
| 55 | Sandra Torres | Argentina | 2:54:48 | |
| 56 | Jo Bun-hui | North Korea | 2:55:54 | |
| 57 | Hsu Yu-fang | Chinese Taipei | 2:55:58 | |
| 58 | Érika Olivera | Chile | 2:57:14 | |
| 59 | Mariela González | Cuba | 3:02:20 | |
| 60 | Ida Kovács | Hungary | 3:03:21 | |
| 61 | Svetlana Şepelev-Tcaci | Moldova | 3:03:29 | |
| 62 | Ana Dias | Portugal | 3:08:11 | |
| 63 | Inga Juodeškienė | Lithuania | 3:09:18 | |
| 64 | Mamokete Lechela | Lesotho | 3:11:56 | |
| 65 | Aguida Amaral | Timor-Leste | 3:18:25 | |
| 66 | Luvsanlkhündegiin Otgonbayar | Mongolia | 3:48:42 | |
| | Paula Radcliffe | Great Britain | DNF | |
| | Margaret Okayo | Kenya | DNF | |
| | Ulrike Maisch | Germany | DNF | |
| | Monika Drybulska | Poland | DNF | |
| | Ham Bong-sil | North Korea | DNF | |
| | Rakiya Maraoui-Quétier | France | DNF | |
| | Nasria Baghdad-Azaïdj | Algeria | DNF | |
| | Márcia Narloch | Brazil | DNF | |
| | Marlene Fortunato | Brazil | DNF | |
| | Asha Gigi | Ethiopia | DNF | |
| | Lidia Șimon | Romania | DNF | |
| | Nadia Ejjafini | Bahrain | DNF | |
| | Banuelia Mrashani | Tanzania | DNF | |
| | Workenesh Tola | Ethiopia | DNF | |
| | Lale Öztürk | Turkey | DNF | |
| | Irina Bogachova | Kyrgyzstan | DNF | |
