= Mihaela Botezan =

Romanian long-distance runner

Mihaela Maria Botezan (earlier Mihaela Prundus; born 21 November 1976 in Ocna Mureş) is a Romanian long-distance runner who specializes mainly in the 10000 metres and the half marathon. She represented Romania at the 2004 Summer Olympics, the 2002 European Athletics Championships, twice at the World Championships in Athletics (2001, 2003) and five times at the IAAF World Half Marathon Championships.

She holds the current Romanian national record in the 10,000 m with 31:11.24 minutes, achieved at the 2004 Summer Olympics. This beat Viorica Ghican's time which had stood since 1990.

She received a two-year ban from the sport for doping, after testing positive for chlorthalidone (a diuretic) at the 2007 Hamburg Marathon.

== International competitions ==
Year	Competition	Venue	Position	Event	Notes
Representing Romania
2000	World Half Marathon Championships	Veracruz, Mexico	6th	Half marathon	
2001	World Championships	Edmonton, Canada	5th	10,000 m	
	World Half Marathon Championships	Bristol, United Kingdom	10th	Half marathon	
2002	European Championships	Munich, Germany	6th	5000 m	
2002	European Championships	Munich, Germany	4th	10,000 m	
2002	World Half Marathon Championships	Brussels, Belgium	4th	Half marathon	1:09:24 PB
2003	World Championships	Paris, France	13th	10,000 m	
2003	World Championships	Paris, France	51st	Marathon	2:41:13
2004	Olympic Games	Athens, Greece	11th	10,000 m	31:11.24 NR
2004	World Half Marathon Championships	New Delhi, India	10th	Half marathon	
2005	World Half Marathon Championships	Edmonton, Canada	5th	Half marathon	

== Personal bests ==
- 3000 metres - 9:02.61 min (2003)
- 3000 metres steeplechase - 10:08.46 min (1999)
- 5000 metres - 15:08.78 min (2001)
- 10,000 metres - 31:11.24 min (2004)
- Half marathon - 1:09:24 hrs (2002)
- Marathon - 2:25:32 hrs (2003)

== See also ==
- List of doping cases in athletics
