= Yekaterina Shatnaya =

Kazakhstani triathlete

Yekaterina ("Katya") Shatnaya (born February 21, 1979, in Almaty) is an athlete from Kazakhstan, who competes in triathlon. Shatnaya competed at the second Olympic triathlon at the 2004 Summer Olympics. She took forty-first place with a total time of 2:19:26.75.
