= Svetlana Zakharova (runner) =

Russian long-distance runner

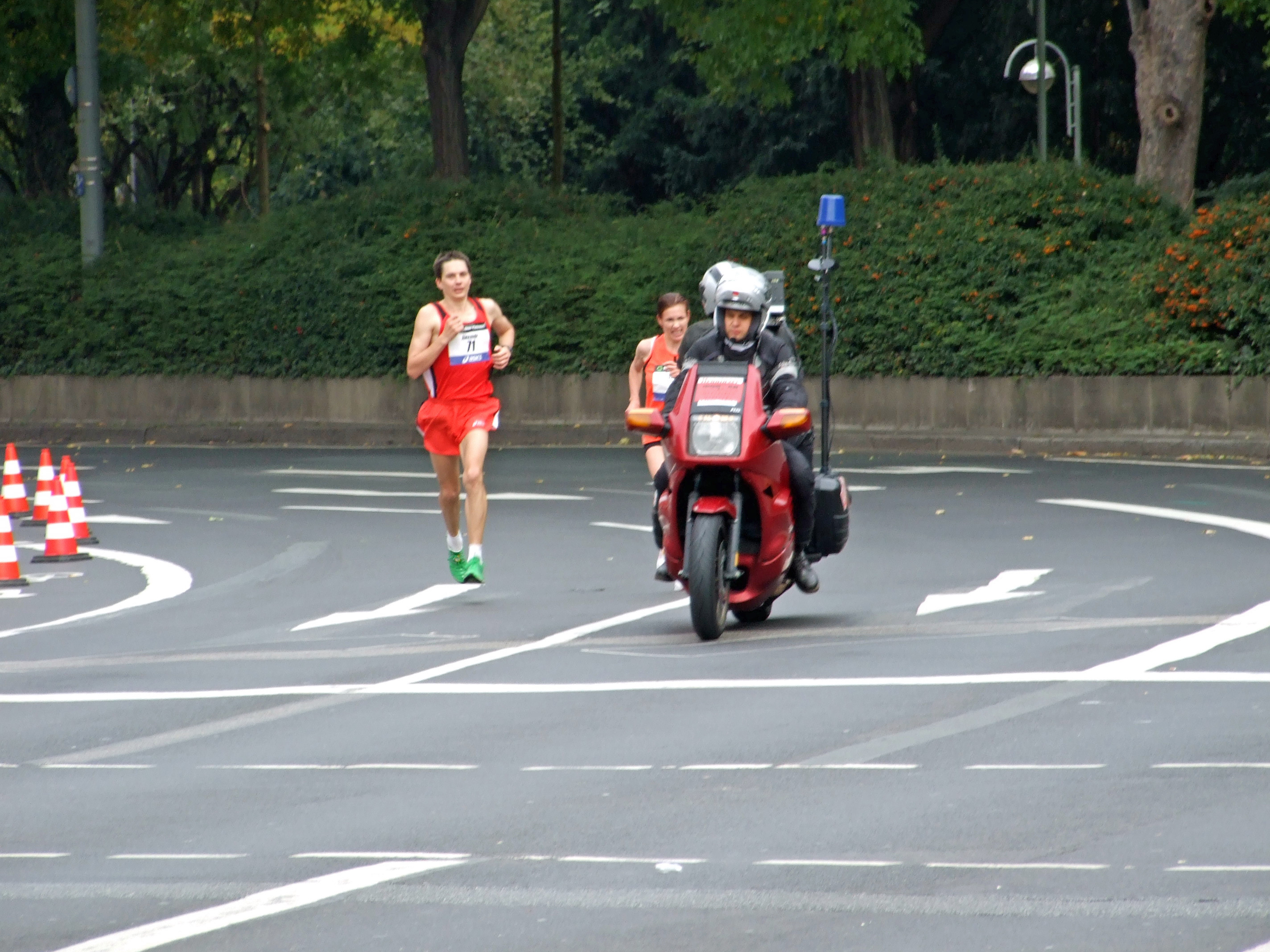
Frankfurt-Marathon 2007 (2.place)

Svetlana Vladimirovna Zakharova (Russian: Светлана Владимировна Захарова), née Vasilieva, (15 September 1970 in Chuvashia) is a Russian long-distance runner, who specializes in marathon races. She won several international marathons, such as: the Honolulu Marathon (1997, 2002 and 2009), the Chicago Marathon (2003) and the Boston Marathon (2003). She participated twice in the Olympic Games.

At the Olympic Games in 2004 at Athens she finished 9th in the marathon in 2:32:04. At the Olympic Games in 2008 at Beijing she finished 22nd in the marathon in 2:32:16.

In the 1990s sometimes she raced under the name Svetlana Vasilyeva.

Svetlana Zakharova has been married to her coach Nikolai Zacharov.

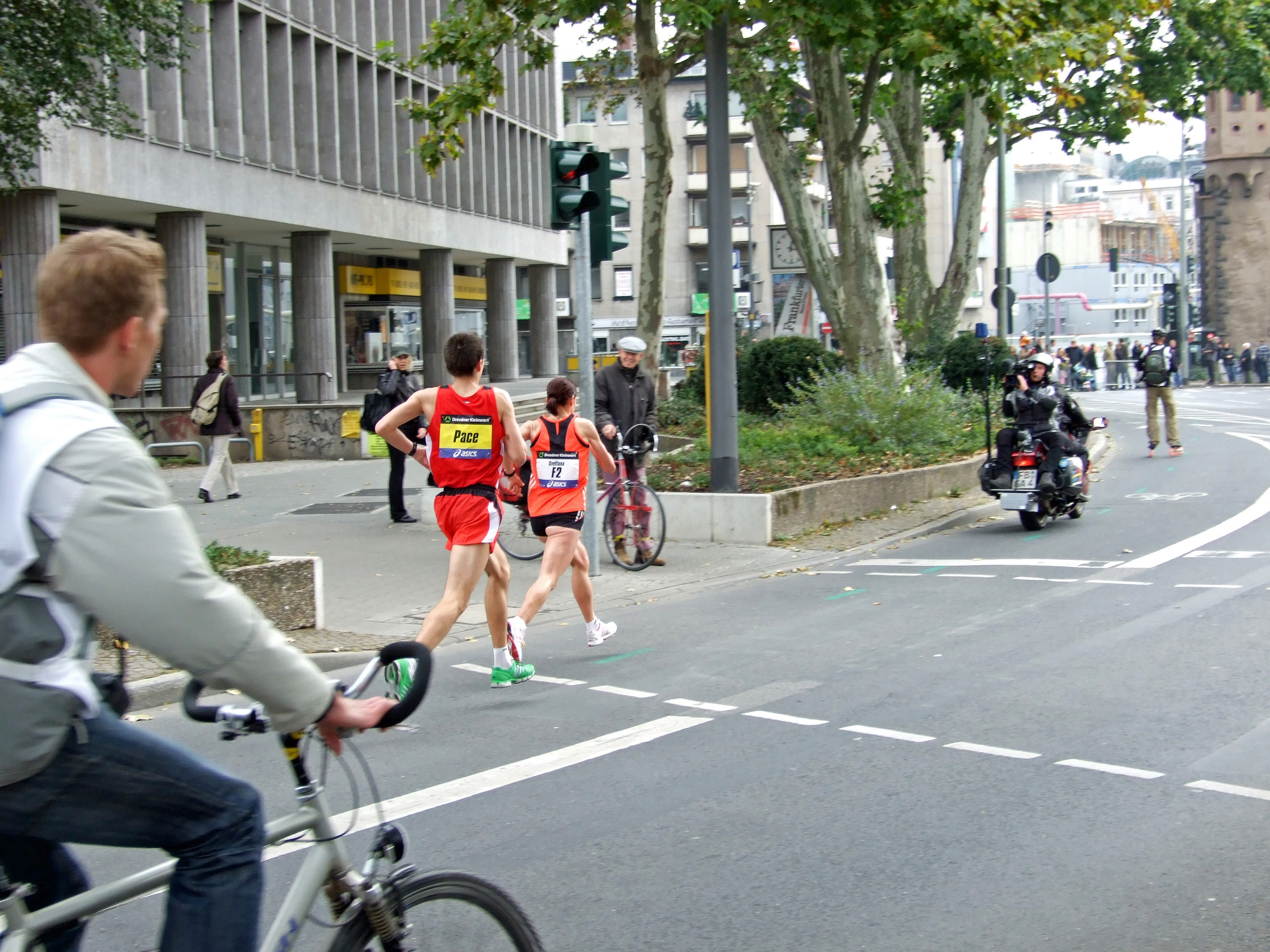
Frankfurt-Marathon 2007 (at this time first)

== Achievements ==
Year	Competition	Venue	Position	Event	Notes
Representing Russia
1997	Honolulu Marathon	Honolulu, Hawaii	1st	Marathon	2:33:14
1998	Los Angeles Marathon	Los Angeles, USA	5th	Marathon	
1998	World Half Marathon Championships	Uster, Switzerland	13th	Half marathon	
1998	Los Angeles Marathon	Los Angeles, USA	2nd	Marathon	
1999	Berlin Marathon	Berlin, Germany	3rd	Marathon	2:27:08
2000	London Marathon	London, United Kingdom	10th	Marathon	2:28:11
2001	London Marathon	London, United Kingdom	2nd	Marathon	2:24:04
2001	World Championships	Edmonton, Canada	3rd	Marathon	2:26:18
2001	New York City Marathon	New York City, USA	3rd	Marathon	2:25:13
2001	Honolulu Marathon	Honolulu, Hawaii	2nd	Marathon	2:30:37
2002	World Half Marathon Championships	Brussels, Belgium	12th	Half marathon	1:09:48 PB
2002	Chicago Marathon	Chicago, United States	4th	Marathon	2:21:31
2002	Honolulu Marathon	Honolulu, Hawaii	1st	Marathon	2:29:08
2003	World Championships	Paris, France	9th	Marathon	
2003	Boston Marathon	Boston, United States	1st	Marathon	
2003	Chicago Marathon	Chicago, United States	1st	Marathon	
2004	Olympic Games	Athens, Greece	9th	Marathon	
2007	Frankfurt Marathon	Frankfurt, Germany	2nd	Marathon	
2008	Olympic Games	Beijing, PR China	22nd	Marathon	2:32:16
2009	World Championships	Berlin, Germany	15th	Marathon	2:29:55
2009	Honolulu Marathon	Honolulu, Hawaii	1st	Marathon	2:28:34

=== Personal bests ===
- Half marathon - 1:09:48 hrs (2002)
- Marathon - 2:21:31 hrs (2002)
