= Corinne Raux =

French duathlete

Personal information
- Nationality: French
- Born: 16 August 1976 (age 49) Combourg
- Height: 1.48 m (4 ft 10 in)

Sport
- Events: Duathlon, Marathon

Corinne Raux (born 16 August 1976 in Combourg) is a French duathlete who was duathon world champion in 2002. She also practiced the marathon successfully, taking 15th in the women's event at the 2004 Summer Olympics.

== Biography ==
=== Youth ===
Corinne Raux began sport in schools and ran in her youth for an Athletics club. She had some success, but focused on her studies and got a baccalaureate of science. She continued her studies and obtained a state diploma as a physiotherapist in 1998. Living in Savoy she naturally practiced mountain running, the VTT, but also the Duathlon where she had some success.

=== Career in duathlon ===
After resuming sporting activities suspended by her student career, she began practicing Duathlon in 2000 and quickly joined the team of France.

In 2002, she won the ITU Duathlon World Championships in the United States. This is her only victory in a global competition. She abandoned the duathlon in favor of Running which remains her main specialty.

=== Career in athletics ===
Since 2003, Corinne Raux has chosen to focus solely on road racing.

In 2004 at the Paris marathon, which was her second marathon, Corinne Raux performed outstandingly taking a place on the podium and winning the third qualifying spot for 2004 Summer Olympics at Athens. She also becomes the third-best French performer at the distance, running 2:29:19 after Chantal Dallenbach and Maria Rebelo. She participates in Athens and represents France with Rakkia Quétier-Marawi and Hafida Gadi. In a marathon race marred by great heat, she takes 15th with a time of 2:34:54.

In 2005, she took 5th place in the Paris marathon with a time of 2:28:47, 20 seconds off the French record held by Chantal Dallenbach. She improved on that occasion her personal best by almost 30 seconds. As in 2003, she also won the Marathon Bay of Mont Saint-Michel in 2005. She became the French marathon championship, for 2005 also.

=== Retirement ===
With Masseuse and physiotherapist training, Corinne Raux, after many competitions and some injuries, stopped the practice of elite running. She resumed the practice of her masseuse profession, which she had put on hold for her competitive period. She is now focusing on the physical and mental preparation of athletes. She shares her knowledge and experience through her physiotherapy practice.

== Awards and records ==
=== Record in duathlon ===
The table shows the most significant results (podium) obtained in the national and international Duathlon circuit.

Awards duathlon
Année	Compétition	Pays	Position	Temps
2003	French Championship Duathlon	France	3rd	Timing
2002	ITU Duathlon World Championships	United States	1st	1h 57' 36"
2002	French Championship Duathlon	France	2nd	Timing
2001	French Championship Duathlon	France	2nd	Timing

=== Record in athletics ===
- 2002
  - Mountain Trail running champion of France
- 2003
  - (gold) winner of Bay of Mont Saint-Miche Marathon
  - Champion of France in the Half Marathon
- 2004
  - 3rd of Paris marathon
  - 14th the marathon Summer Olympics 2004
- 2005
  - (gold) winner Bay of Mont Saint-Michel Marathon
  - (gold) Winner of the Corrida de langueux
  - 5th in the Paris Marathon

=== Personal Bests ===
Personal Bests
Event	Performance	Location	Date
Semi-marathon	1h 11' 39"	Chassieu	18 May 2003
Marathon	2h 28' 48"	Paris	10 April 2005
