= Mizuki Noguchi =

Japanese marathon runner

Medal record

Women's athletics

Representing Japan

Olympic Games
Gold medal – first place	2004 Athens	Marathon

World Championships
Silver medal – second place	2003 Paris	Marathon

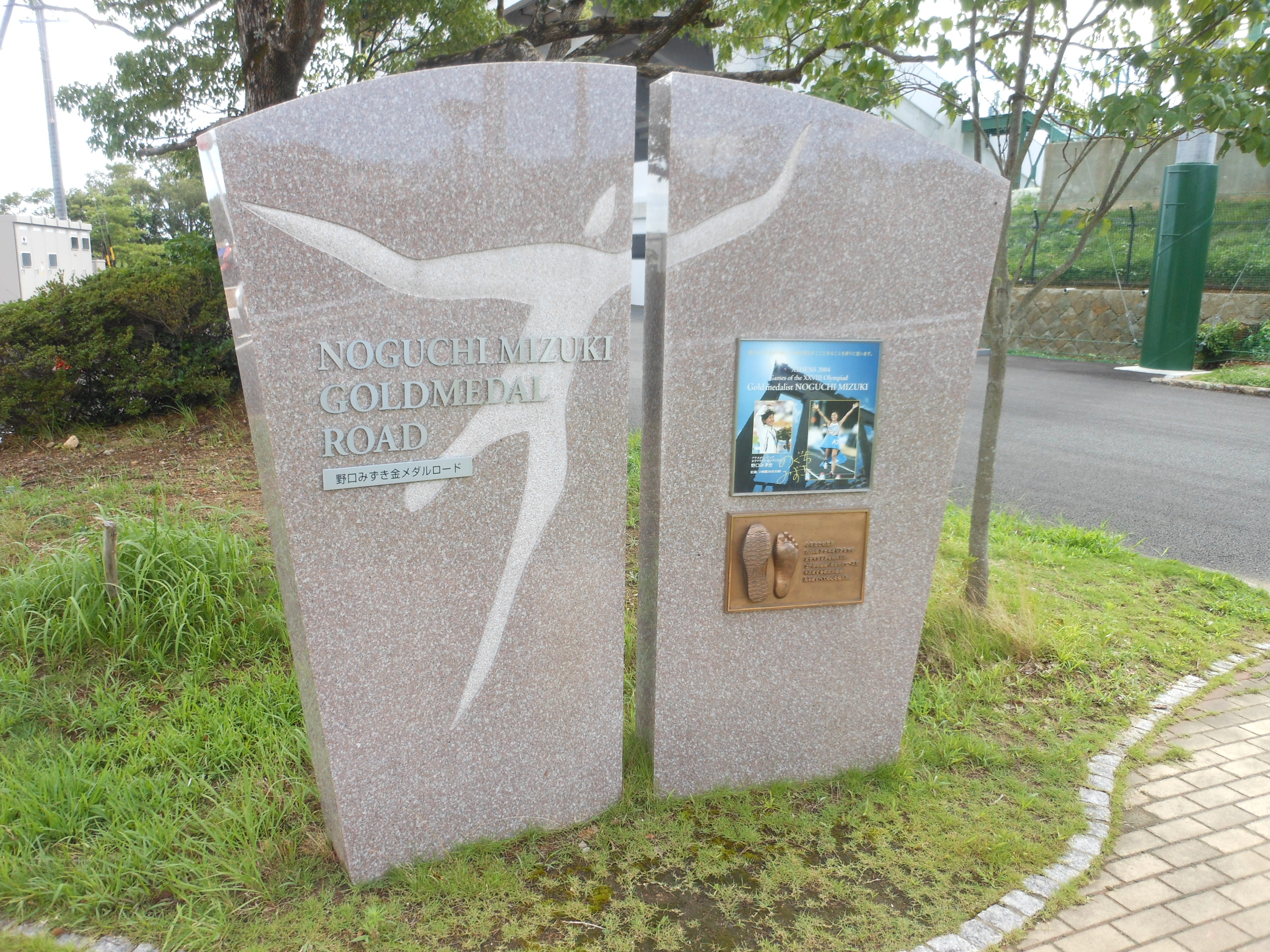

Mizuki Noguchi (野口 みずき, Noguchi Mizuki; born July 3, 1978) is a Japanese professional long-distance runner who specialises in the marathon event. She is an Olympic champion over the distance.

Initially starting out as a track and cross country athlete, her first major success was becoming the Asian cross country champion at age 21. She soon switched to road running, however, focusing on the half marathon. She won the individual and team silver medals at the 1999 IAAF World Half Marathon Championships, and won a second team silver with a fourth-place finish at the same competition in 2000.

A switch to the marathon event demonstrated her talents further: She won the Nagoya and Osaka Women's Marathons, and took the silver medal in the marathon at the 2003 World Championships in Athletics. Her good form continued and she became the Olympic champion in the marathon at the 2004 Athens Olympics. She won the Berlin Marathon the following year, setting world records at 25 km and 30 km along the way, and finishing with a personal best of 2:19:12 – a course record in Berlin and a new Asian record for the distance. The 25K world record was beaten by Mary Keitany of Kenya in 2010, who ran the distance in 1:19:53 hours.

Before the 2008 Summer Olympics in Beijing, Noguchi had set the second fastest time in the world for the previous year. However, she was ruled out of all competitions after tests revealed that she had fatigue and a muscular back problem. She missed the Olympics and the entire 2009 and 2010 seasons as a result. She returned in November 2011 with a fifth-place finish at the Zevenheuvelenloop. She tried to gain a spot on the 2012 Olympic team, but her run of 2:25:33 hours left her in sixth at the Nagoya Women's Marathon. A return to Nagoya in 2013 brought her third place with a run of 2:24:05 hours.

== Early career ==
Noguchi was born in Kanagawa and grew up in Ise in Ise city in Mie. She started competing in track and field during her first year of middle school. While attending Ujiyamada Commercial High School, she entered the national high school track meet and competed in the 3000 m and the long-distance relay.

In 1997 she was hired by Wacoal, a maker of women's clothing, as part of their "Spark Angels" program of sponsored women athletes. In October of the following year the director, Nobuyuki Fujita (藤田信之), left over differences with the company. He took with him a coach and a few athletes, including Noguchi. While she was receiving unemployment benefits for a short time, she remained active athletically. In February 1999, Fujita and all his followers were hired by Globaly, a commodity futures firm.

Noguchi began 1999 by winning individual and team gold at the Asian Cross Country Championships, but after winning the Inuyama half marathon, she was inspired to concentrate her efforts on that event. She was ranked second in the world that year, and in 2001 she won in the all-Japan corporate league. With a string of victories, she became known as "Queen of the Half Marathon." Continuing through the Miyazaki Women's Road Race competition in January 2004, she competed in 24 half marathons and won 14 of them. Only twice was she beaten by another Japanese athlete.

In March 2002 she entered her first full marathon, the Nagoya International Women's Marathon, and won. In January 2003 she won the Osaka International Women's Marathon with a time of 2 hours 21 minutes 18 seconds, the second-fastest on record for Japan. She also won a silver medal in the World Championships in Paris that year.

In 2005, as Globaly closed futures trade department and athletic team, Fujita and all his followers moved to Sysmex, a medical instruments manufacturer, in December.

== 2004 Olympic champion ==
On 22 August 2004 Noguchi won the marathon in the 2004 Athens Olympics, against a field which included world record holder Paula Radcliffe of Great Britain, and the 2003 world champion Catherine Ndereba of Kenya. The race over the Classic course began with temperatures exceeding 95 degrees (35 °C). A leading pack of 12 stayed together through halfway in 1 hour 14 minutes. Noguchi made her move on the tough uphill section between the 25-kilometer (16 mi) and 30-kilometer (19 mi) marks. When she reached the 30-kilometer sign, after running the previous 5 kilometers in just under 17 minutes, she had a 26-second lead on Elfenesh Alemu of Ethiopia and a 32-second lead on Radcliffe. Heading into the streets of downtown Athens, Noguchi held off Catherine Ndereba, who closed the gap over the final 5 kilometers but could not make up the difference. Noguchi won in 2 hours 26 minutes 20 seconds. Ndereba finished 12 seconds behind Noguchi. Deena Kastor of the United States took the bronze at 2:27:20.

== Records at Berlin ==
On September 25, 2005 Noguchi won the Berlin Marathon, which was her first big competition since winning the gold medal in Athens more than a year earlier. Four years earlier, the Berlin Marathon was won by Naoko Takahashi, the Japanese runner who took the Olympic gold medal in Sydney in 2000. Takahashi's remarkable win in 2001 in Berlin marked the first time in history that a woman ran sub-2:20, clocking in at 2 hours, 19 minutes and 46 seconds. Noguchi improved on Takahashi's time by more than half a minute, winning the 2005 Marathon in 2:19:12. Noguchi's time set three new records: the Berlin Marathon course record, the Japanese record, and the Asian record.

After the victory, she declared:

I am happy about my victory and the three records – the Japanese record, the Asian record and the course record. The course is really flat and nice to run. The slight ups and downs helped me to find my rhythm. My coach told me not to worry about split times. I have to thank the fabulous spectators, who cheered me all the way to the finish. I am so happy to have run here. [...] I saw a lot of churches and quite old buildings. But I also saw very nice shops and everywhere people. The race was good, only at 35 km my feet started to get heavy. But I thought of my training and I grit my teeth.

== Achievements ==
- All results regarding marathon, unless stated otherwise

Year	Competition	Venue	Position	Notes
Representing Japan
2002	Nagoya Women's Marathon	Nagoya, Japan	1st	2:25:35
2003	Osaka International Ladies Marathon	Osaka, Japan	1st	2:21:18
2003	World Championships	Paris, France	2nd	2:24:14
2004	Olympic Games	Athens, Greece	1st	2:26:20
2005	Berlin Marathon	Berlin, Germany	1st	2:19:12
2007	Tokyo Marathon	Tokyo, Japan	1st	2:21:37
