= Workenesh Tola =

Ethiopian long-distance runner

Personal information
- Nationality: Ethiopian
- Born: 11 October 1980 (age 45)

Sport
- Sport: Long-distance running
- Event: Marathon

Workenesh Tola (born 11 October 1980) is an Ethiopian long-distance runner. She competed in the women's marathon at the 2004 Summer Olympics.
