= Stine Larsen (runner) =

Norwegian long-distance runner

Personal information
- Born: 5 November 1975 (age 50) Bergen, Norway

Sport
- Sport: Track and field
Medal record
Representing Norway
European U23 Championships
Bronze medal – third place	1997 Turku	10,000m

Stine Elisabeth Larsen (born 5 November 1975) is a retired Norwegian long-distance runner who specialized in the marathon.

In her younger days she won a bronze medal in the 10,000 metres at the inaugural European Under 23 Championships in 1997, finishing behind Olivera Jevtic and Annemari Sandell. She finished twelfth at the 2000 World Half Marathon Championships. In the marathon event she has finished seventeenth at the 2003 World Championships and twenty-fourth at the 2004 Olympic Games.

She became Norwegian champion in the half marathon in 1999, representing the sports club FIK BFG Fana.

== Personal bests ==
- 5000 metres - 15:46.02 min (1997)
- 10,000 metres - 32:28.16 min (2000) - fourth among Norwegian 10,000 metres runners, only behind Ingrid Kristiansen, Susanne Wigene and Gunhild Halle Haugen.
- Half marathon - 1:09:28 hrs (2000) - third among Norwegian half marathon runners, only behind Ingrid Kristiansen and Grete Waitz.
- Marathon - 2:27:05 hrs (2002) - third among Norwegian marathon runners, only behind Ingrid Kristiansen and Grete Waitz.

== Achievements ==
Year	Competition	Venue	Position	Event	Notes
Representing Norway
1994	World Junior Championships	Lisbon, Portugal	15th (h)	3000m	9:41.65
1997	European U23 Championships	Turku, Finland	6th	5000m	15:56.92
1997	European U23 Championships	Turku, Finland	3rd	10,000m	33:11.09
2003	World Championships	Paris, France	17th	Marathon	2:30:44
2004	Olympic Games	Athens, Greece	24th	Marathon	2:39:55
