= María Abel =

Spanish long-distance runner

Personal information
- Full name: María Abel Diéguez
- Nationality: Spanish
- Born: 24 October 1974 (age 52) Lugo, Spain
- Height: 163 cm (5 ft 4 in)
- Weight: 46 kg (101 lb)

Sport
- Sport: Long-distance running
- Event: Marathon

María Abel Diéguez (born 24 October 1974) is a Spanish long-distance runner. She competed in the women's marathon at the 2004 Summer Olympics in which she came 26th out of 82 runners with a time of 2:40:13.

Abel's personal best in the Marathon is 2:26:58 set in Frankfurt, Germany on 27 October 2002.
