= Mamokete Lechela =

Lesotho long-distance runner

Personal information
- Nationality: Lesotho
- Born: 1 January 1982 (age 44)

Sport
- Sport: Long-distance running
- Event: Marathon

Mamokete Lechela (born 1 January 1982) is a Lesotho long-distance runner. She competed in the women's marathon at the 2004 Summer Olympics.
