= Zhang Shujing =

Chinese long-distance runner

Zhang Shujing (simplified Chinese: 张淑晶; traditional Chinese: 張淑晶; pinyin: Zhāng Shújīng, born September 13, 1978, in Baicheng, Jilin province) is a Chinese long-distance runner.

She finished twelfth in the marathon at the 2004 Olympic Games and the 2003 World Championships. She also won the Asian Marathon Championships in 2002 and 2004.

Her personal best times are 15:34.54 minutes over 5000 metres (2001), 1:12:46 hours in the half marathon (2003) and 2:23:17 hours in the marathon (2002).

== Achievements ==
- All results regarding marathon, unless stated otherwise

Year	Competition	Venue	Position	Notes
Representing China
2001	Boston Marathon	Boston, United States	12th	2:33:43
2001	Beijing Marathon	Beijing, PR China	5th	2:24:42
2001	Shanghai Marathon	Shanghai, PR China	1st	2:31:54
2002	Shanghai Marathon	Shanghai, PR China	1st	2:30:43
2003	World Championships	Paris, France	12th	2:29:24
2004	Olympic Games	Athens, Greece	12th	2:34:34
2008	Olympic Games	Beijing, PR China	41st	2:35:35
