= Annemette Jensen =

Danish long-distance runner

Personal information
- Nationality: Danish
- Born: 11 April 1972 (age 54) Roskilde, Denmark

Sport
- Sport: Long-distance running
- Event: Marathon
Medal record
Representing Denmark
Summer Universiade
Bronze medal – third place	1999 Palma de Mallorca	10,000m

Annemette Jensen (born 11 April 1972) is a Danish long-distance runner. She competed in the women's marathon at the 2004 Summer Olympics.
