= Athletics at the 2008 Summer Olympics – Women's marathon =

Women's marathon at the Games of the XXIX Olympiad
- Venue: Beijing National Stadium
- Dates: 17 August 2008
- Competitors: 82 from 42 nations
- Winning time: 2:26:44

Medalists
1st place, gold medalist(s)		Constantina Diṭă-Tomescu	Romania
2nd place, silver medalist(s)		Catherine Ndereba	Kenya
3rd place, bronze medalist(s)		Zhou Chunxiu	China

The women's marathon at the 2008 Summer Olympics took place on August 17 around an urban circuit specifically designed for the competition at Beijing, and finished in the Beijing National Stadium; it was, as of today, the last time in Summer Olympics history in which women's marathon route start and/or finish was located in the Olympic Stadium. The qualifying standards were 2:37.00 (A standard) and 2:42.00 (B standard). There were a total number of 82 competitors from 42 nations.

The winner was Constantina Diṭă-Tomescu of Romania who at one point took a lead of over a minute and maintained it ahead of the chasing pack all the way into the stadium. She completed the marathon in a time of 2:26:44. In second place was Catherine Ndereba of Kenya who completed the race in 2:27:06, closely followed by bronze medalist Zhou Chunxiu of China who finished in a time of 2:27:07.

World record holder Paula Radcliffe of Great Britain took part in the race despite injury problems that bothered her throughout the previous year. However, she did not feature for much of the race and had to pause and do some exercises to rid herself of cramps at one point. She then proceeded to finish the marathon in 23rd place in a time of 2:32:38.

== Records ==
Prior to this event, the existing world and Olympic records were as follows:

World record	Paula Radcliffe (GBR)	2:15:25	London, United Kingdom	13 April 2003
Olympic record	Naoko Takahashi (JPN)	2:23:14	Sydney, Australia	24 September 2000

== Schedule ==
All times are China standard time (UTC+8)

Date	Time	Round
Sunday, 17 August 2008	07:30	Final

== Results ==
Rank	Athlete	Country	Result	Notes
1st place, gold medalist(s)	Constantina Diță	Romania	2:26:44	SB
2nd place, silver medalist(s)	Catherine Ndereba	Kenya	2:27:06	
3rd place, bronze medalist(s)	Zhou Chunxiu	China	2:27:07	SB
4	Zhu Xiaolin	China	2:27:16	SB
5	Martha Komu	Kenya	2:27:23	
6	Mara Yamauchi	Great Britain	2:27:29	
7	Irina Timofeyeva	Russia	2:27:31	
8	Lidia Șimon	Romania	2:27:51	
9	Souad Aït Salem	Algeria	2:28:29	
10	Salina Jebet Kosgei	Kenya	2:29:28	
11	Živilė Balčiūnaitė	Lithuania	2:29:33	
12	Kim Kum-Ok	North Korea	2:30:01	SB
13	Yurika Nakamura	Japan	2:30:19	
14	Anna Incerti	Italy	2:30:55	PB
15	Dire Tune	Ethiopia	2:31:16	
16	Nina Rillstone	New Zealand	2:31:16	
17	Bruna Genovese	Italy	2:31:31	
18	Luminiţa Talpoş	Romania	2:31:41	
19	Madaí Pérez	Mexico	2:31:47	
20	Christelle Daunay	France	2:31:48	
21	Benita Johnson	Australia	2:32:06	
22	Svetlana Zakharova	Russia	2:32:16	
23	Paula Radcliffe	Great Britain	2:32:38	
24	Monika Drybulska	Poland	2:32:39	SB
25	Lee Eun-Jung	South Korea	2:33:07	
26	Liz Yelling	Great Britain	2:33:12	
27	Blake Russell	United States	2:33:13	
28	Beata Naigambo	Namibia	2:33:29	
29	Vincenza Sicari	Italy	2:33:31	
30	Dorota Gruca	Poland	2:33:32	
31	Tetyana Filonyuk	Ukraine	2:33:35	
32	Marisa Barros	Portugal	2:34:08	
33	Lisa Jane Weightman	Australia	2:34:16	
34	Kirsten Melkevik Otterbu	Norway	2:34:35	
35	Liza Hunter-Galvan	New Zealand	2:34:51	
36	Jong Yong-Ok	North Korea	2:34:52	
37	Rasa Drazdauskaitė	Lithuania	2:35:09	
38	Melanie Kraus	Germany	2:35:17	
39	María Portillo	Peru	2:35:19	NR
40	Helalia Johannes	Namibia	2:35:22	
41	Shujing Zhang	China	2:35:35	
42	Lucia Kimani	Bosnia and Herzegovina	2:35:47	NR
43	Sandra Ruales	Ecuador	2:35:53	PB
44	Kate Smyth	Australia	2:36:10	
45	Yesenia Centeno	Spain	2:36:25	
46	Ana Dias	Portugal	2:36:25	
47	Nebiat Habtemariam	Eritrea	2:37:03	
48	Jo Bun-Hui	North Korea	2:37:04	
49	Tabitha Tsatsa	Zimbabwe	2:37:10	
50	Bahar Doğan	Turkey	2:37:12	PB
51	Marily dos Santos	Brazil	2:38:10	
52	Susanne Hahn	Germany	2:38:31	
53	Chae Eun-Hee	South Korea	2:38:52	
54	Alessandra Aguilar	Spain	2:39:29	
55	Patricia Rétiz	Mexico	2:39:34	
56	Lee Sun-Young	South Korea	2:43:23	
57	Eva-Maria Gradwohl	Austria	2:44:24	
58	Iuliia Andreeva	Kyrgyzstan	2:44:41	
59	Sonia Calizaya	Bolivia	2:45:53	
60	Eléni Dónta	Greece	2:46:44	
61	Karina Pérez	Mexico	2:47:02	
62	Bertha Sánchez	Colombia	2:47:02	
63	Pauline Curley	Ireland	2:47:16	
64	María José Pueyo	Spain	2:48:01	
65	Petra Teveli	Hungary	2:48:32	
66	Epiphanie Nyirabarame	Rwanda	2:49:32	
67	Zuzana Šaríková	Slovakia	2:49:39	
68	Gabriela Traña	Costa Rica	2:53:45	
69	Oksana Sklyarenko	Ukraine	2:55:39	
–	Berhane Adere	Ethiopia	DNF	
–	Gete Wami	Ethiopia	DNF	
–	Inês Monteiro	Portugal	DNF	
–	Valentina Delion	Moldova	DNF	
–	Reiko Tosa	Japan	DNF	
–	Olivera Jevtic	Serbia	DNF	
–	Galina Bogomolova	Russia	DNF	
–	Mariana Diaz Ximenez	Timor-Leste	DNF	
–	Beáta Rakonczai	Hungary	DNF	
–	Mamorallo Tjoka	Lesotho	DNF	
–	Magdalena Lewy-Boulet	United States	DNF	
–	Deena Kastor	United States	DNF	
–	Nadia Ejjafini	Bahrain	DNS	
