= 2006 European Athletics Championships – Women's marathon =

Women's marathon at the European Athletics Championships

The Women's Marathon at the 2006 European Athletics Championships was held at the Ullevi on August 12.

== Medalists ==
Gold	Silver	Bronze
Ulrike Maisch; Germany	Olivera Jevtić; Serbia	Irina Permitina; Russia

== Schedule ==
Date	Time	Round
August 12, 2006	12:10	Final

== Final ranking ==
Rank	Name	Nationality	Time	Notes
1st place, gold medalist(s)	Ulrike Maisch	Germany	2:30:01	PB
2nd place, silver medalist(s)	Olivera Jevtić	Serbia	2:30:27	
3rd place, bronze medalist(s)	Irina Permitina	Russia	2:30:53	
4	Živilė Balčiūnaitė	Lithuania	2:31:01	SB
5	Bruna Genovese	Italy	2:31:15	
6	Alevtina Biktimirova	Russia	2:31:23	
7	Deborah Toniolo	Italy	2:31:31	
8	Giovanna Volpato	Italy	2:32:04	
9	Anna Incerti	Italy	2:32:53	PB
10	Anália Rosa	Portugal	2:32:56	PB
11	Claudia Dreher	Germany	2:33:53	
12	Nailiya Yulamanova	Russia	2:35:26	
13	Kirsten Melkevik Otterbu	Norway	2:35:59	SB
14	Susanne Hahn	Germany	2:36:17	
15	Anna Rahm	Sweden	2:36:48	
16	Tracey Morris	Great Britain	2:37:34	
17	Alina Gherasim	Romania	2:37:57	
18	Maija Oravamäki	Finland	2:39:17	
19	Annemette Aagaard	Denmark	2:39:29	
20	Lena Gavelin	Sweden	2:39:36	
21	Marcella Mancini	Italy	2:40:47	
22	Nili Abramski	Israel	2:41:23	SB
23	Albina Ivanova	Russia	2:42:02	
24	Natalya Volgina	Russia	2:42:23	
25	Carmen Oliveras	France	2:43:25	
26	Magdaliní Gazéa	Greece	2:46:08	
27	María José Pueyo	Spain	2:47:27	
28	Fatima Yvelain	France	2:48:09	
29	Elena Fetizon	France	2:57:48	
DID NOT FINISH (DNF)
	Ana Dias	Portugal		DNF
	Luminita Zaituc	Germany		DNF
	Fátima Silva	Portugal		DNF
	Rosaria Console	Italy		DNF
	Lisa Blommé	Sweden		DNF

Italy won European Marathon Cup

== See also ==
- 2006 European Marathon Cup
