= 2002 European Athletics Championships – Women's marathon =

Women's marathon at the European Athletics Championships

The Women's Marathon at the 2002 European Championships, which were held in Munich, Germany, took place on August 10, 2002.

== Medalists ==
Gold	Maria Guida; Italy (ITA)
Silver	Luminita Zaituc; Germany (GER)
Bronze	Sonja Oberem; Germany (GER)

== Abbreviations ==
- All times shown are in hours:minutes:seconds

DNS	did not start
NM	no mark
WR	world record
AR	area record
NR	national record
PB	personal best
SB	season best

== Records ==
Standing records prior to the 2002 European Athletics Championships
World Record	Tegla Loroupe (KEN)	2:20:47	April 19, 1998	Rotterdam, Netherlands
Event Record	Manuela Machado (POR)	2:27:10	August 23, 1998	Budapest, Hungary
Broken records at the 2002 European Athletics Championships
Event Record	Maria Guida (ITA)	2:26:05	August 10, 2002	Munich, Germany

== Final ranking ==
Rank	Athlete	Time	Note
1st place, gold medalist(s)	Maria Guida (ITA)	2:26:05	CR
2nd place, silver medalist(s)	Luminita Zaituc (GER)	2:26:58	
3rd place, bronze medalist(s)	Sonja Oberem (GER)	2:28:45	
4	Jane Salumäe (EST)	2:33:46	
5	Rosaria Console (ITA)	2:35:23	
6	Nadezhda Wijenberg (NED)	2:36:06	
7	Marie Söderström-Lundberg (SWE)	2:36:13	
8	Ulrike Maisch (GER)	2:36:41	
9	Annemette Jensen (DEN)	2:37:27	
10	Judit Földing-Nagy (HUN)	2:37:33	
11	Anna Pichrtová (CZE)	2:37:39	
12	Giovanna Volpato (ITA)	2:38:15	
13	Irina Timofeyeva (RUS)	2:40:11	
14	Tatyana Zolotaryova (RUS)	2:41:29	
15	Dagmar Rabensteiner (AUT)	2:41:39	
16	Lidiya Vasilevskaya (RUS)	2:44:28	
17	Melanie Kraus (GER)	2:44:56	
18	Susanne Johansson (SWE)	2:47:11	
19	Fátima Silva (POR)	2:47:28	
20	Irina Safarova (RUS)	2:49:21	
21	Karin Schon (SWE)	2:49:57	
DID NOT FINISH (DNF)
—	Marleen Renders (BEL)	DNF	
—	Valentina Delion (MDA)	DNF	
—	Nuţa Olaru (ROM)	DNF	
—	Alina Ivanova (RUS)	DNF	
DISQUALIFIED (DSQ)
—	Chantal Dallenbach (FRA)	DQ	

== See also ==
- 2002 Marathon Year Ranking
- 2002 European Marathon Cup
