= Munich Marathon =

Annual race in Germany held since 1983

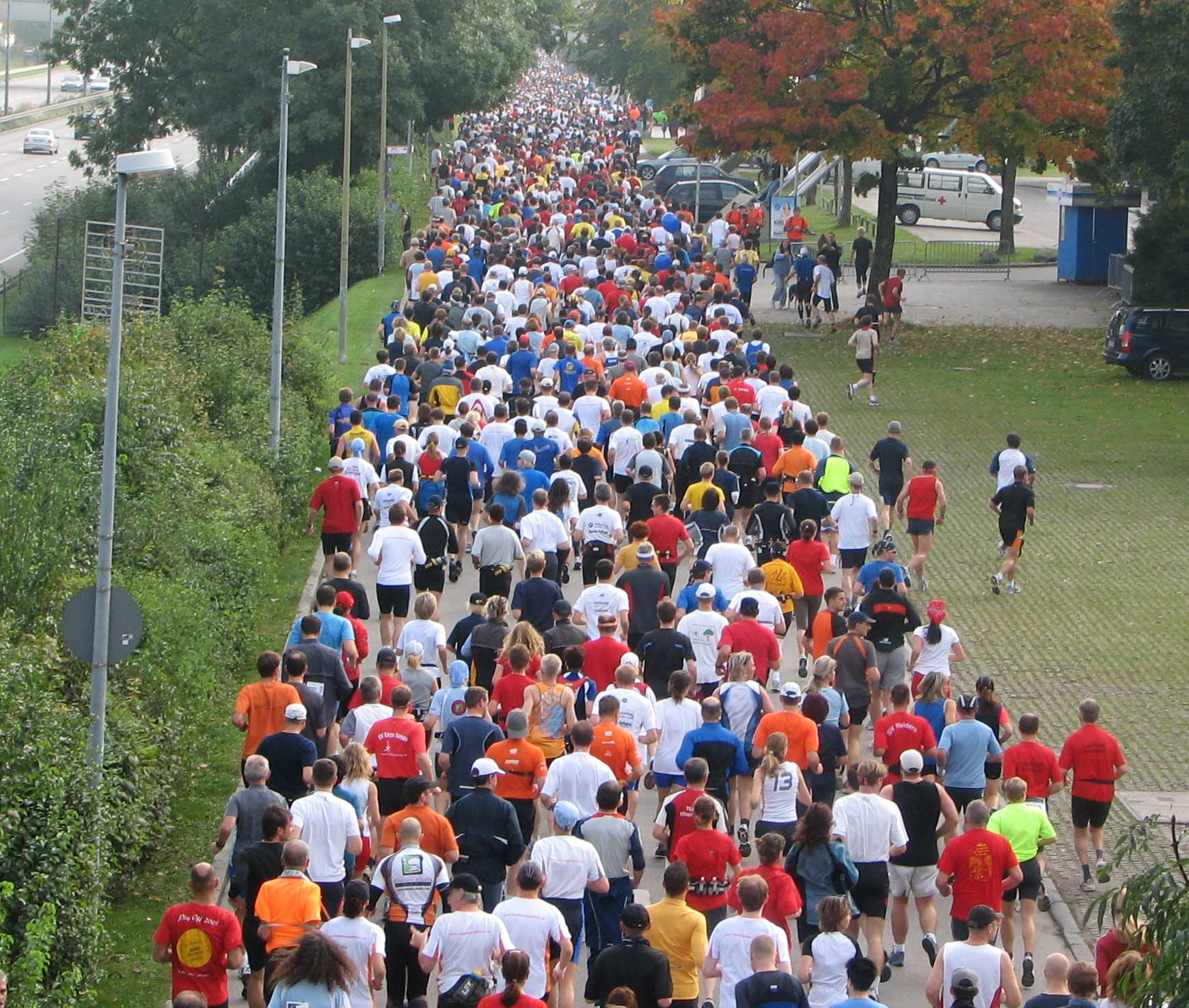
- In the starting corrals, 2005
- Date: Usually October
- Location: Munich, Germany
- Event type: Road
- Distance: Marathon, half marathon, 10K run
- Primary sponsor: Generali
- Established: 1983 (43 years ago)
- Course records: Men's: 2:09:17 (2023) (Kenya) Bernard Muai Katui; Women's: 2:28:36 (2022) (Poland) Aleksandra Lisowska
- Website: Munich Marathon
- Participants: 2,489 finishers (2021); 4,226 (2019)

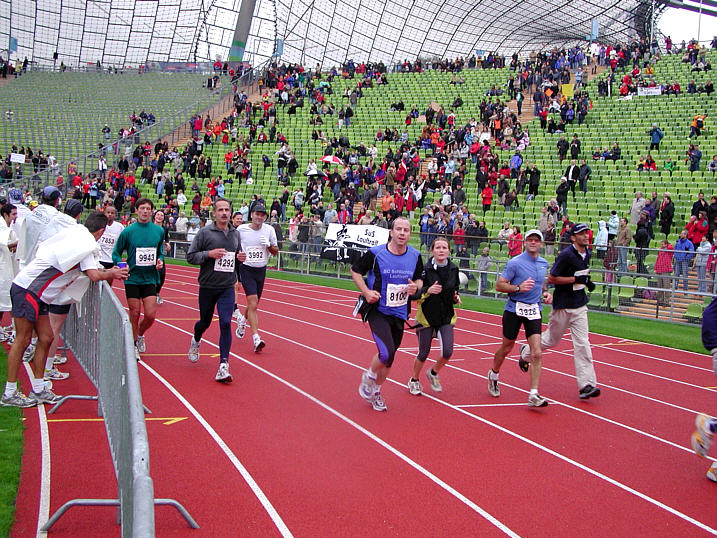
Finishing in Olympiastadion, 2004

The Munich Marathon (German: München Marathon) (also known as Generali Munich Marathon for sponsorship reasons) is an annual marathon road running event hosted by the city of Munich, Germany, usually in October, since 1983. The event features a full marathon (42.195 km (26.219 mi)) as well as a half marathon and 10K run. The marathon is categorized as a Gold Label Road Race by World Athletics.

== History ==
Following the marathon races at the 1972 Munich Olympics, a number of shorter running events were held in the city every year.

In 1983, an annual marathon was established by Michael Schultz-Tholen's company (FVS) and was later jointly organised with the Munich Road Runners Club. The marathon followed the same course as the 1972 Olympic race, beginning in Coubertinplatz in Olympic Park Munich and finishing the last 300 Meters to the finish line in Olympic Stadium. The competition featured nearly 2000 finishers at its inaugural event and this quickly grew, reaching to over 6500 by the late 1980s. As well as the mass race, it attracted high level international competitors in elite races. Participation had a sudden decline after 1990 – going from 6340 finishers that year to 3360 six years later. This change resulted in the eventual bankruptcy of the parent company and its president Schultz-Tholen (who was a polo specialist with limited prior experience in the sector).

In 2000, the race was relaunched on a course outside the inner city, but its popularity returned only when the competition returned to the city streets and the Olympic stadium. Over five thousand people finished the race in 2001. The race established itself among Germany's largest footraces and had a record high of 9041 marathon finishers in 2004.

The 2006 event was the official German Marathon Championship race and Matthias Körner and Carmen Siewert were declared the men's and women's champions, respectively. The event hosted the national marathon championship again in 2012, 2013, and 2014.

The 2020 in-person edition of the race was cancelled due to the coronavirus pandemic.

== Course ==
External images
- Course map of full marathon in 2005
- Course map of full marathon in 2018
- Course map of full marathon in 2019

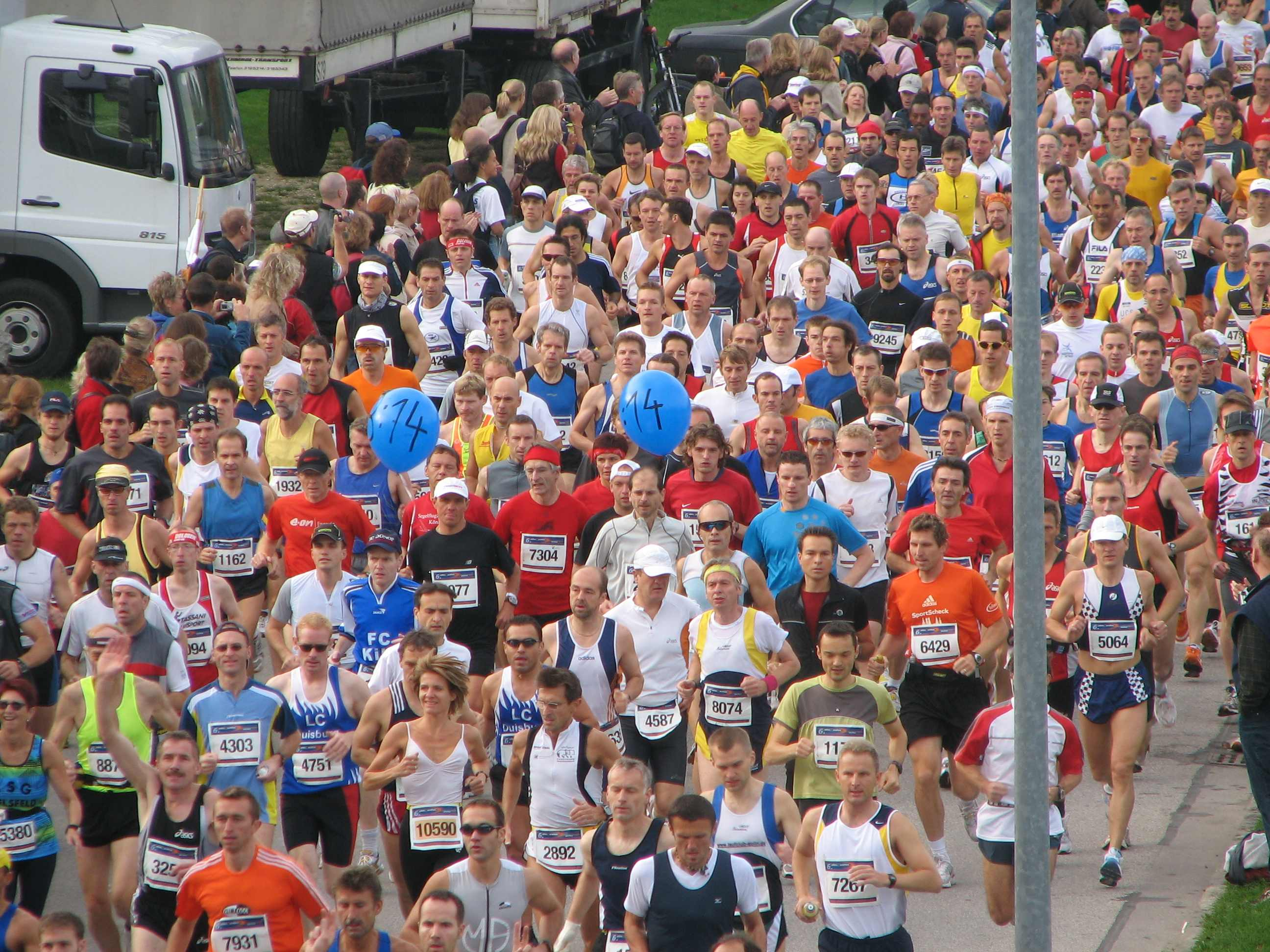
In the starting corrals, 2005

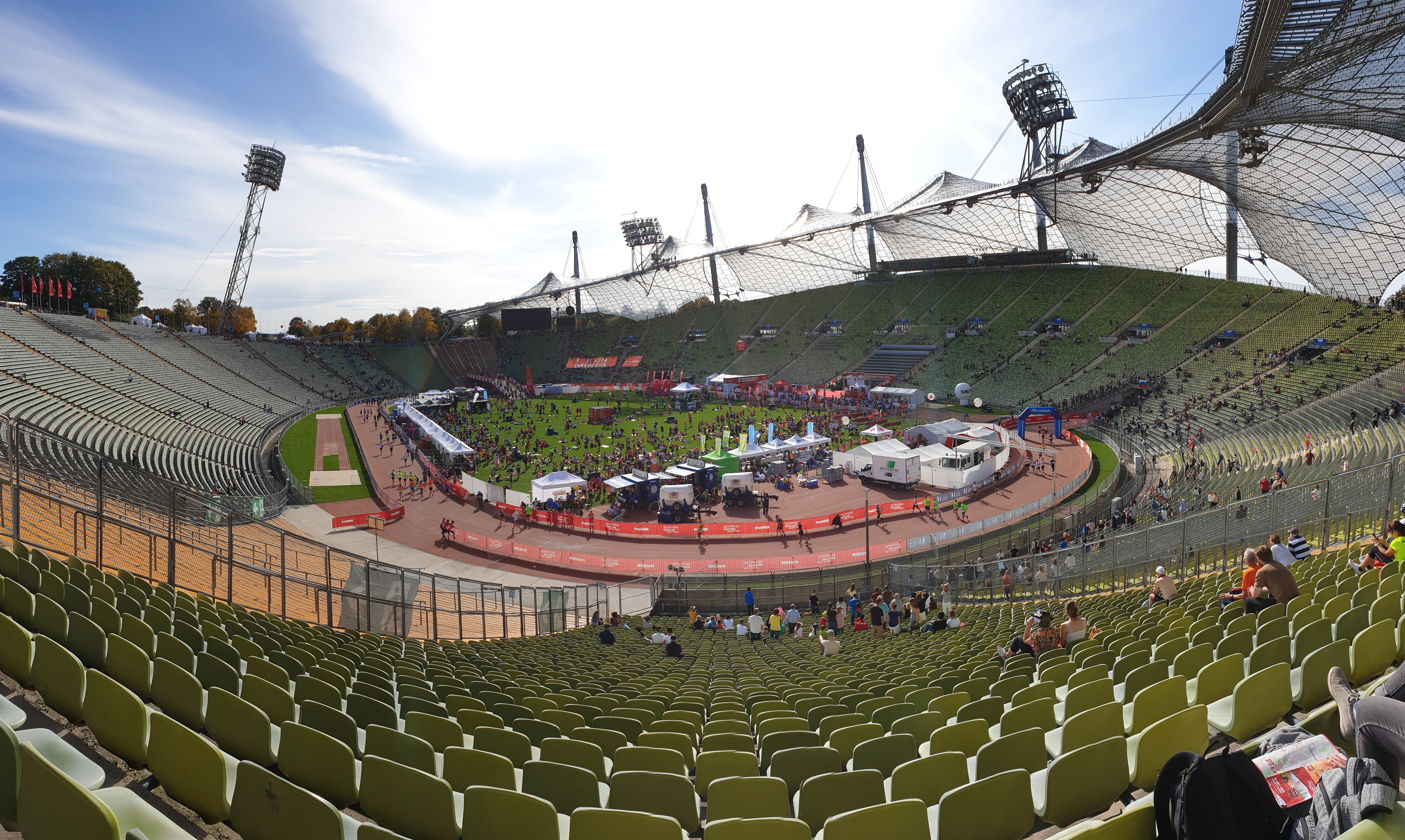
Olympiastadion finish area, 2019

The marathon starts in Coubertinplatz in Olympiapark, and ends in the nearby Olympiastadion (Olympic Stadium).

The course first heads south out of Olympiapark and then east along Elisabethstraße and Franz-Joseph-Straße until it intersects Leopoldstraße at Giselastraße station. Runners then head south and west to hit Königsplatz and circle Karolinenplatz before heading back north to Giselastraße station. The marathon then heads northeast to enter Englischer Garten and nearly reaches its northern end before turning back southwest to exit the park near the Chinese Tower around the race's halfway point.

After crossing the Isar river via the Max Joseph Bridge, runners head northeast along Oberföhringer Straße and then south along Cosimastraße, eventually crossing the train tracks at Berg am Laim Station. The course then heads west to Altstadt via the Ludwig Bridge, and then heads north on Leopoldstraße back to Giselastraße station. The marathon then returns to Olympiapark via Franz-Joseph-Straße and Elisabethstraße, and finishes inside Olympiastadion.

== Winners ==
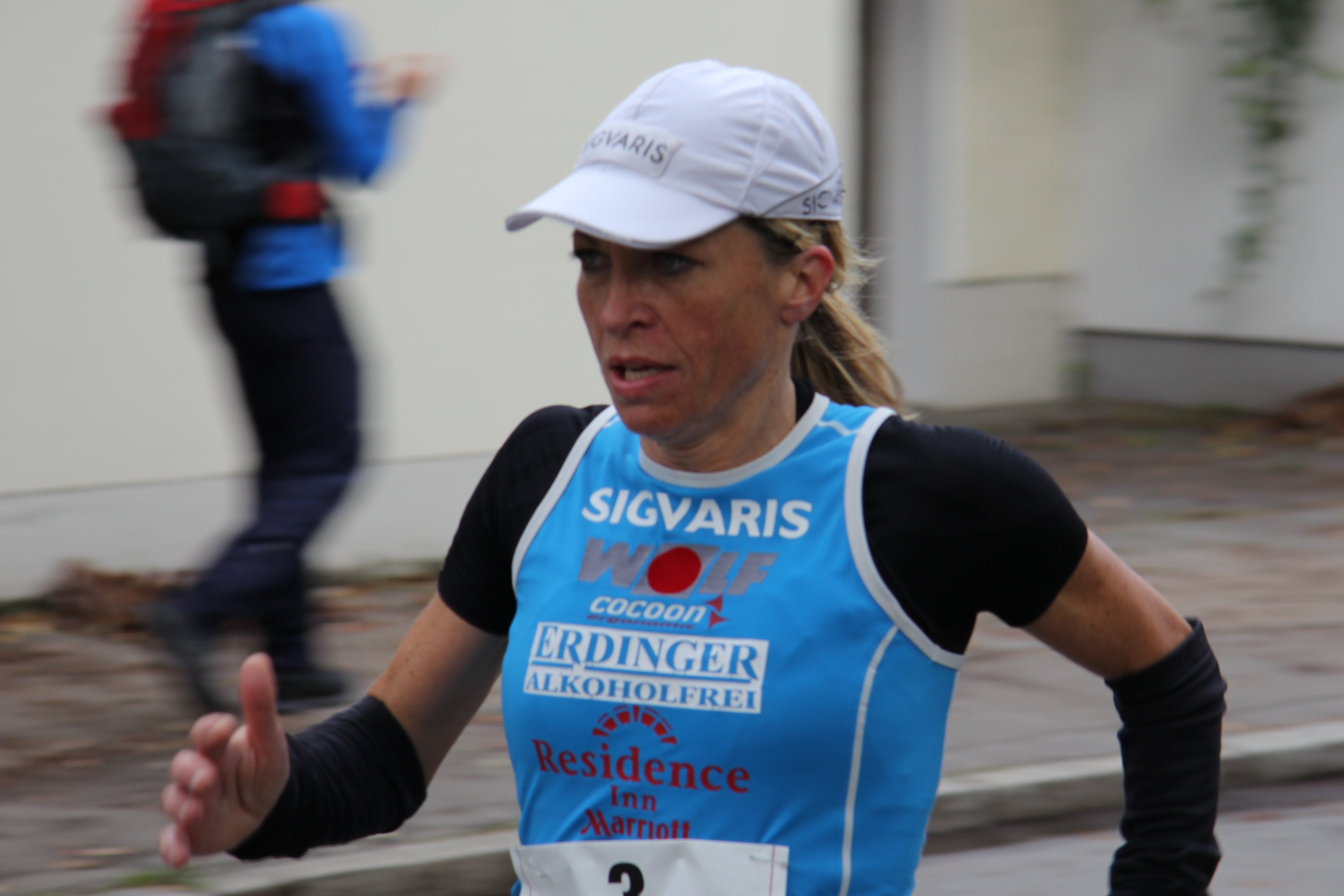
Bernadette Pichlmaier, two-time winner, en route to her win in 2011

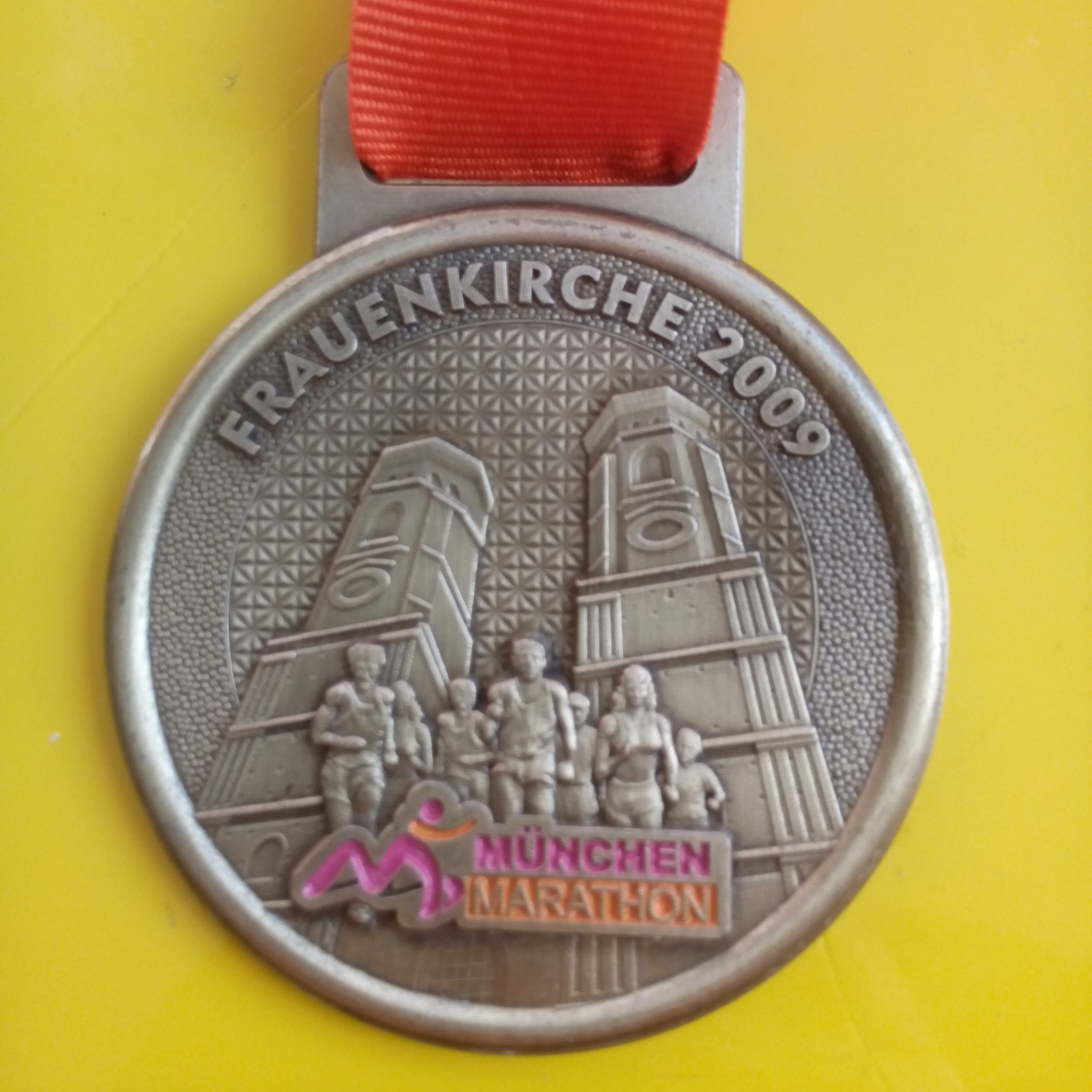
Finisher medal in 2009

The course records over the entire history of the city's marathons are held by Michael Kite of Kenya (2:09:46 hours in 2000) and Hungary's Karolina Szabó (2:33:09 hours in 1991).

Key:

Course record (in bold)
National championship race

=== Marathon ===
Ed.	Year	Men's winner	Time	Women's winner	Time	Rf.
1	1983	Kjell-Erik Ståhl (SWE)	2:13:33	Christa Vahlensieck (FRG)	2:33:45	
2	1984	Karel Lismont (BEL)	2:12:50	Christa Vahlensieck (FRG)	2:38:50	
3	1985	Marjan Krempl (YUG)	2:19:30	Olivia Grüner (FRG)	2:45:52	
4	1986	István Kerékjártó (HUN)	2:17:46	Olivia Grüner (FRG)	2:38:51	
5	1987	Ahmet Altun (TUR)	2:13:37	Angelika Dunke (FRG)	2:40:59	
6	1988	Ernest Tjela (LES)	2:12:55	Janeth Mayal (BRA)	2:42:34	
7	1989	Herbert Steffny (FRG)	2:11:30	Janeth Mayal (BRA)	2:37:04	
8	1990	Steffen Dittmann (FRG)	2:13:47	Charlotte Teske (FRG)	2:33:12	
9	1991	João Alves (BRA)	2:15:34	Karolina Szabó (HUN)	2:33:09	
10	1992	Ivan Uvizl (TCH)	2:14:28	Birgit Lennartz (GER)	2:39:17	
11	1993	Gidamis Shahanga (TAN)	2:14:28	Fátima Neves (POR)	2:39:34	
12	1994	Gidamis Shahanga (TAN)	2:17:27	Svetlana Kazatkina (RUS)	2:53:45	
13	1995	Zoltán Holba (HUN)	2:18:42	Karin Steiger (GER)	2:47:43	
14	1996	Lars Andervang (SWE)	2:19:11	Maria Bak (GER)	2:41:56	
—	—	not held from 1997 to 2000				
15	2000	Michael Kite (KEN)	2:09:46	Elżbieta Jarosz (POL)	2:37:34	
16	2001	Andriy Naumov (UKR)	2:13:57	Valentina Delion (MDA)	2:43:41	
17	2002	Jonathan Wyatt (NZL)	2:23:19	Silke Fersch (GER)	2:46:18	
18	2003	Gemechu Roba (ETH)	2:19:26	Silke Fersch (GER)	2:44:59	
19	2004	Reinhard Harrasser (ITA)	2:21:21	Christine Lelan (FRA)	2:46:18	
20	2005	Herman Achmüller (ITA)	2:24:28	Cornelia Firsching (GER)	2:54:03	
21	2006	Matthias Körner (GER)	2:21:55	Carmen Siewert (GER)	2:47:22	
22	2007	Falk Cierpinski (GER)	2:25:26	Cornelia Firsching (GER)	2:56:33	
23	2008	Steffen Justus (GER)	2:21:38	Melanie Hohenester (GER)	2:49:20	
24	2009	Maksim Saliy (UKR)	2:28:13	Luzia Schmid (GER)	2:53:16	
25	2010	Andriy Naumov (UKR)	2:18:23	Bernadette Pichlmaier (GER)	2:35:28	
26	2011	Richard Friedrich (GER)	2:19:27	Bernadette Pichlmaier (GER)	2:38:02	
27	2012	Jan Hamann (GER)	2:19:46	Susanne Hahn (GER)	2:32:11	
28	2013	Frank Schauer (GER)	2:18:56	Silke Optekamp (GER)	2:41:50	
29	2014	Tobias Schreindl (GER)	2:21:47	Steffi Volke (GER)	2:44:37	
30	2015	Florian Stelzle (GER)	2:29:59	Julia Viellehner (GER)	2:40:28	
31	2016	Oliver Herrmann (GER)	2:27:12	Latifa Schuster (FRA)	2:56:20	
32	2017	Mario Wernsdörfer (GER)	2:27:52	Bianca Meyer (GER)	2:49:35	
33	2018	Andreas Straßner (GER)	2:27:58	Susanne Schreindl (GER)	2:49:38	
34	2019	Andreas Straßner (GER)	2:28:52	Alexandra Morozova (RUS)	2:48:00	
—	2020	cancelled due to coronavirus pandemic				
35	2021	Alexander Hirschhäuser (GER)	2:18:38	Corinna Harrer (GER)	2:43:11	
36	2022	Richard Ringer (GER)	2:10:21	Aleksandra Lisowska (POL)	**2:28:36**	
37	2023	Bernard Muai Katui (KEN)	**2:09:17**	Catherine Cherotich (KEN)	2:31:34	
38	2024	Nehemiah Kipyegon (KEN)	2:10:02	Asmare Beyene Assefa (ETH)	2:29:44	
39	2025	Gabriel Lautenschlager (GER)	2:18:30	Nina Voelckel (GER)	2:31:34	

=== Half Marathon ===
Ed.	Year	Men's winner	Time	Women's winner	Time	Rf.
25	2010	Sören Kah (GER)	1:07:31	Bianca Meyer (GER)	1:21:38	
26	2011	Sören Kah (GER)	1:07:07	Susanne Hahn (GER)	1:13:02	
27	2012	Sören Kah (GER)	1:04:43	Ingalena Heuck (GER)	1:21:35	
28	2013	Valentin Unterholzner (GER)	1:07:23	Corinna Harrer (GER)	1:14:04	
29	2014	Gianluca Borghesi (ITA)	1:08:31	Teresa Montrone (ITA)	1:19:08	
30	2015	Tobias Schreindl (GER)	1:06:45	Susanne Ölhorn (GER)	1:21:18	
31	2016	Wondemagen Seed-Egasso (ETH)	1:07:47	Nora Schmitz (GER)	1:20:41	
32	2017	Tobias Schreindl (GER)	1:08:26	Susanne Schreindl (GER)	1:20:09	
33	2018	Salvatore Gambino (ITA)	1:09:59	Sophie Hardy (BEL)	1:16:37	
34	2019	Luis Carlos Rivero (GUA)	1:08:47	Susanne Schreindl (GER)	1:20:13	
—	2020	cancelled due to coronavirus pandemic				
35	2021	Thomas Kotissek (GER)	1:09:23	Maria Kerres (GER)	1:15:55	

=== 10K ===
Year	Men's winner	Time	Women's winner	Time	Rf.
2010	Joseph Katib (GER)	31:38	Julia Viellehner (GER)	34:22	
2011	Joseph Katib (GER)	31:30	Christine Schleifer (GER)	34:53	
2012	Tobias Gröbl (GER)	30:53	Veronica Clio Pohl (GER)	34:48	
2013	Matthew Coloe (AUS)	31:14	Julia Leenders (GER)	35:37	
2014	Sebastian Nadler (GER)	31:48	Tina Fischl (GER)	35:15	
2015	Sebastian Hallmann (GER)	31:28	Tina Fischl (GER)	35:05	
2016	Julio Del Val González (ESP)	31:32	Laura-Jane Day (GBR)	35:40	
2017	Clemens Bleistein (GER)	30:39	Andrea Meier (SUI)	35:51	
2018	Max Weigand (GER)	32:09	Jule Vetter (GER)	36:36	
2019	Andrey Karpin (RUS)	33:01	Tina Fischl (GER)	36:24	
2020	cancelled due to coronavirus pandemic				
2021	Maxmilian Thorwirth (GER)	30:30	Hanna Klein (GER)	32:13	
