= Chae Eun-hee =

South Korean marathon runner

Personal information
- Nationality: South Korea
- Born: 20 June 1982 (age 44)
- Height: 1.58 m (5 ft 2 in)
- Weight: 41 kg (90 lb)

Korean name
- Hangul: 채은희
- RR: Chae Eunhui
- MR: Ch'ae Ŭnhŭi

Sport
- Sport: Athletics
- Event: Marathon
- Club: K-water Daejeon
- Coached by: Seo Geo-Hyun

Achievements and titles
- Personal best: Marathon: 2:31:38 (2008)

Chae Eun-hee (Korean: 채은희; born June 20, 1982) is a South Korean marathon runner. Chae represented South Korea at the 2008 Summer Olympics in Beijing, where she competed in the women's marathon, along with her teammates and fellow runners Lee Eun-Jung and Lee Sun-Young. She successfully finished the race in fifty-third place by twenty-one seconds behind Germany's Susanne Hahn, with a time of 2:38:52.
