= 2003 European Athletics U23 Championships – Women's 10,000 metres =

The women's 10,000 metres event at the 2003 European Athletics U23 Championships was held in Bydgoszcz, Poland, at Zawisza Stadion on 19 July.

== Medalists ==
Gold	Krisztina Papp; Hungary
Silver	Valentina Levushkina; Russia
Bronze	Louise Damen; United Kingdom

== Results ==
=== Final ===
19 July

Rank	Name	Nationality	Time	Notes
1st place, gold medalist(s)	Krisztina Papp	Hungary	33:23.02	
2nd place, silver medalist(s)	Valentina Levushkina	Russia	33:28.73	
3rd place, bronze medalist(s)	Louise Damen	United Kingdom	33:29.82	
4	Iryna Kunakhavets	Belarus	34:02.63	
5	Collette Fagan	United Kingdom	34:08.93	
6	Oksana Sklyarenko	Ukraine	34:12.66	
7	Nicole Güldemeister	Germany	34:16.71	
8	Anna Rahm	Sweden	34:18.46	
9	Michaela Schedler	Germany	34:22.36	
10	Nathalie De Vos	Belgium	34:43.11	
11	Rosana Fernández	Spain	34:46.55	
12	Nina Thysk Sørensen	Denmark	35:08.42	
13	Minna Myllykoski	Finland	35:20.33	
14	Karolina Jarzyńska	Poland	35:20.92	

== Participation ==
According to an unofficial count, 14 athletes from 12 countries participated in the event.

- Belarus (1)
- Belgium (1)
- Denmark (1)
- Finland (1)
- Germany (2)
- Hungary (1)
- Poland (1)
- Russia (1)
- Spain (1)
- Sweden (1)
- Ukraine (1)
- United Kingdom (2)
