= Patricia Rétiz =

Mexican marathon runner

Personal information
- Full name: Patricia Rétiz Gutiérrez
- Nationality: Mexico
- Born: 17 March 1971 (age 55) Mexico City, Mexico
- Height: 1.68 m (5 ft 6 in)
- Weight: 52 kg (115 lb)

Sport
- Sport: Athletics
- Event: Marathon

Achievements and titles
- Personal bests: Half-marathon: 1:12:29 (2008); Marathon: 2:30:29 (2008)

Patricia Rétiz Gutiérrez (born March 17, 1971, in Mexico City) is a Mexican marathon runner. She set a personal best time of 2:30:29, by winning the 2008 LALA Marathon in Torreón, Coahuila.

At age thirty-seven, Retiz made her official debut for the 2008 Summer Olympics in Beijing, where she competed in the women's marathon, along with her teammates Karina and Madai Pérez. She successfully finished the race in fifty-fifth place by five seconds behind Spain's Alessandra Aguilar, with a time of 2:39:34.
