= 2010 European Athletics Championships – Women's marathon =

Women's marathon at the European Athletics Championships

The women's marathon at the 2010 European Athletics Championships was held on the streets of Barcelona on 31 July. The event doubled as the European Team Marathon Cup 2010.

== Doping ==
Živilė Balčiūnaitė of Lithuania originally won the marathon and was awarded the gold medal, but was disqualified for doping after she tested positive for testosterone. Nailiya Yulamanova of Russia originally came second, and was set to be upgraded to gold winner after Živilė Balčiūnaitė was disqualified. However, in July 2012, Yulamanova was also disqualified for doping, as her results from 20 August 2009 onwards were annulled due to abnormalities in her biological passport profile.

Anna Incerti (gold), Tetyana Filonyuk (silver) and Isabellah Andersson (bronze) received the medals by mail.

== Medalists ==
| Gold | Anna Incerti; Italy (ITA) |
| Silver | Tetyana Filonyuk; Ukraine (UKR) |
| Bronze | Isabellah Andersson; Sweden (SWE) |

== Records ==
Standing records prior to the 2010 European Athletics Championships
| World record | Paula Radcliffe (GBR) | 2:15:25 | London, United Kingdom | 13 April 2003 |
| European record | Paula Radcliffe (GBR) | 2:15:25 | London, United Kingdom | 13 April 2003 |
| Championship record | Maria Guida (ITA) | 2:26:05 | Munich, Germany | 10 August 2002 |
| World Leading | Liliya Shobukhova (RUS) | 2:22:00 | London, United Kingdom | 25 April 2010 |
| European Leading | Liliya Shobukhova (RUS) | 2:22:00 | London, United Kingdom | 25 April 2010 |

== Schedule ==
| Date | Time | Round |
|---|---|---|
| 31 July 2010 | 10:05 | Final |

== Results ==
| Rank | Athlete | Nationality | Time | Notes |
|---|---|---|---|---|
| DQ | Živilė Balčiūnaitė | Lithuania | ~~2:31:14~~ | Doping |
| DQ | Nailya Yulamanova | Russia | ~~2:32:15~~ | Doping |
| 1st place, gold medalist(s) | Anna Incerti | Italy | 2:32:48 | |
| 2nd place, silver medalist(s) | Tetyana Filonyuk | Ukraine | 2:33:57 | |
| 3rd place, bronze medalist(s) | Isabellah Andersson | Sweden | 2:34:43 | |
| 4 | Olivera Jevtić | Serbia | 2:34:56 | |
| 5 | Alessandra Aguilar | Spain | 2:35:04 | |
| 6 | Marisa Barros | Portugal | 2:35:43 | |
| DQ | Irina Timofeyeva | Russia | ~~2:35:53~~ | Doping |
| 7 | Rosaria Console | Italy | 2:36:20 | |
| 8 | Silviya Skvortsova | Russia | 2:36:31 | |
| 9 | Lidia Șimon | Romania | 2:36:52 | |
| 10 | Deborah Toniolo | Italy | 2:37:10 | |
| 11 | Michelle Ross-Cope | Great Britain & N.I. | 2:38:45 | |
| 12 | Rasa Drazdauskaitė | Lithuania | 2:38:55 | |
| 13 | Susan Partridge | Great Britain & N.I. | 2:39:07 | |
| 14 | Beatriz Ros | Spain | 2:40:10 | |
| 15 | Ana Dias | Portugal | 2:41:02 | |
| 16 | Kirsten Melkevik Otterbu | Norway | 2:42:24 | |
| 17 | Holly Rush | Great Britain & N.I. | 2:42:44 | |
| 18 | Helen Decker | Great Britain & N.I. | 2:43:00 | |
| 19 | Svitlana Stanko-Klymenko | Ukraine | 2:43:35 | |
| 20 | Anna von Schenck | Sweden | 2:43:36 | |
| 21 | Rebecca Robinson | Great Britain & N.I. | 2:44:06 | |
| 22 | Jo Wilkinson | Great Britain & N.I. | 2:44:11 | |
| 23 | Kjersti Karoline Danielsen | Norway | 2:45:00 | |
| 24 | Maja Neuenschwander | Switzerland | 2:45:17 | |
| 25 | Yevgeniya Danilova | Russia | 2:46:21 | |
| 26 | Margarita Plaksina | Russia | 2:47:26 | |
| 27 | Christina Bus Holth | Norway | 2:48:15 | |
| 28 | Olena Biloshchuk | Ukraine | 2:51:21 | |
| 29 | Gezashign Šafářová | Azerbaijan | 2:51:59 | |
| 30 | Lena Gavelin | Sweden | 2:53:13 | |
| 31 | Remalda Kergytė | Lithuania | 2:55:12 | |
| 32 | Daneja Grandovec | Slovenia | 3:07:51 | |
| 33 | Vira Ovcharuk | Ukraine | 3:09:27 | |
| | Sladjana Perunović | Montenegro | DNF | |
| | Tatyana Pushkareva | Russia | DNF | |
| | Patricia Morceli | Switzerland | DNF | |
| | Mónica Rosa | Portugal | DNF | |
| | Daniela Cârlan | Romania | DNF | |
| | Fernanda Ribeiro | Portugal | DNF | |
| | Karolina Jarzyńska | Poland | DNF | |

== See also ==
- 2010 European Marathon Cup
