= Anna Incerti =

Italian long-distance runner (born 1980)

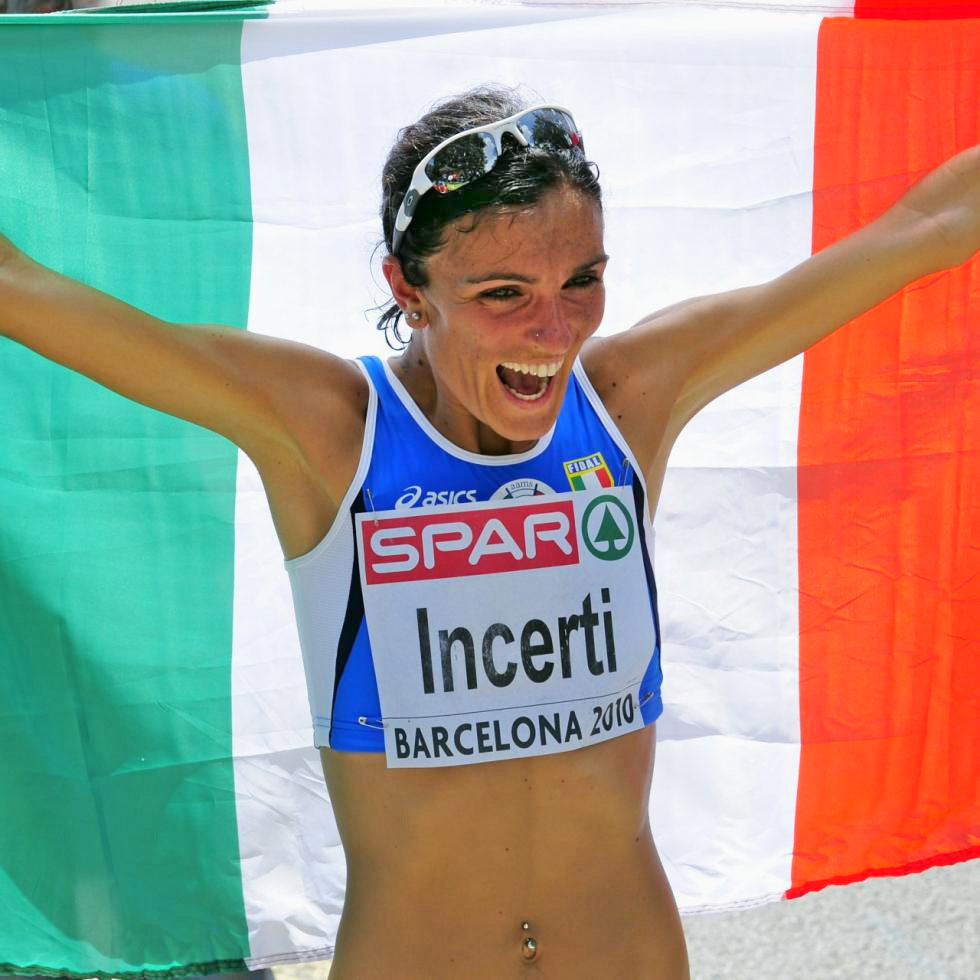
- Incerti celebrating her gold medal in the 2010 European Championships

Personal information
- National team: Italy (17 capa)
- Born: 19 January 1980 (age 46) Palermo, Italy
- Height: 1.68 m (5 ft 6 in)
- Weight: 45 kg (99 lb)

Sport
- Country: Italy
- Sport: Athletics
- Event: Long-distance running
- Club: G.S. Fiamme Azzurre
- Coached by: Tommaso Ticali

Achievements and titles
- Personal bests: 5000 m: 15:15.5 (2011); 10000 m: 32:12.01 (2012); Half marathon: 1:08:18 (2012); Marathon: 2:25:32 (2011)
Medal record
Individual
Event	1st	2nd	3rd
European Championships	1	0	0
Universiade	0	0	1
Mediterranean Games	1	0	0
Total	2	0	1
Team
Event	1st	2nd	3rd
European Marathon Cup	3	0	0
European Half Marathon Cup	0	1	0
European 10,000m Cup	0	1	2
Total	3	2	2
European Championships
Gold medal – first place	2010 Barcelona	Marathon
Silver medal – second place	2016 Amsterdam	Half marathon team
Universiade
Bronze medal – third place	2003 Daegu	10,000 m
Mediterranean Games
Gold medal – first place	2009 Pescara	Half marathon
European Marathon Cup
Gold medal – first place	2006 Gothenburg	Team marathon
Gold medal – first place	2010 Barcelona	Team marathon
Gold medal – first place	2014 Helsinki	Team marathon

Anna Carmela Incerti (born 19 January 1980 in Palermo) is an Italian long-distance runner who specializes in the marathon. She has represented Italy in the marathon at European, World and Olympic-level. She won the bronze in the event at the 2010 European Championships, later upgraded to silver and then to gold.

== Biography ==
She was the 2003 winner of the Florence Marathon, which made her the Italian marathon champion for that year. She also won the bronze medal in 10,000 metres at the 2003 Summer Universiade. Incerti began focusing on longer distances and set a personal best in the marathon at the 2006 European Athletics Championships, running a time of 2:32:53 for ninth place. She finished 17th over the distance at the 2007 World Championships in Athletics.

She represented Italy at the 2008 Beijing Olympics and came fourteenth in the marathon with a personal best run of 2:30:55 hours. Later that year, she won the Milan Marathon in a new personal best time of 2:27:42 hours and finished the season with an Italian record run of 32:1 minutes for the 10K at the San Silvestre Barcelona.

Incerti won the Roma-Ostia Half Marathon in March 2009 and then secured the half marathon title at the 2009 Mediterranean Games in Pescara. At the 2010 European Athletics Championships she won the bronze medal in the marathon race, but was subsequently upgraded to the silver (following the disqualification of race winner Živilė Balčiūnaitė for a doping offence), then to the gold medal (following the disqualification of runner-up Nailiya Yulamanova).

She ran at the 2011 Osaka Ladies Marathon and improved her best time to 2:27:33, coming in fourth place. She also improved her half marathon best soon after, defeating Jessica Augusto to defend at the Roma-Ostia with a time of 1:09:06 – which was also a new course record. After some high altitude training in Ifrane in Morocco she ran at the Stramilano half marathon, but she felt her second-place finish behind Ababel Yeshaneh was not a good performance. She decided to enter the 2011 Berlin Marathon and she ran a significant personal best of 2:25:32 hours. She was runner-up to Valeria Straneo at the Stramilano in 2012 and was fifth in a competitive Roma-Ostia field.

She is married to fellow marathon runner Stefano Scaini.

== Achievements ==
Year	Competition	Venue	Position	Event	Time	Notes
2003	Universiade	(South Korea) Daegu	3rd	10,000 m	33:49.71	
2006	European Championships	(Sweden) Gothenburg	9th	Marathon	2:32:53	
2007	World Championships	(Japan) Osaka	17th	Marathon	2:36:36	
2008	Olympic Games	(China) Beijing	14th	Marathon	2:30:55	
2009	Mediterranean Games	(Italy) Pescara	1st	Half marathon	1:12:25	
2010	European Championships	(Spain) Barcelona	1st	Marathon	2:32:48	
2014	European Championships	(Switzerland) Zürich	6th	Marathon	2:29:58	

== National titles ==
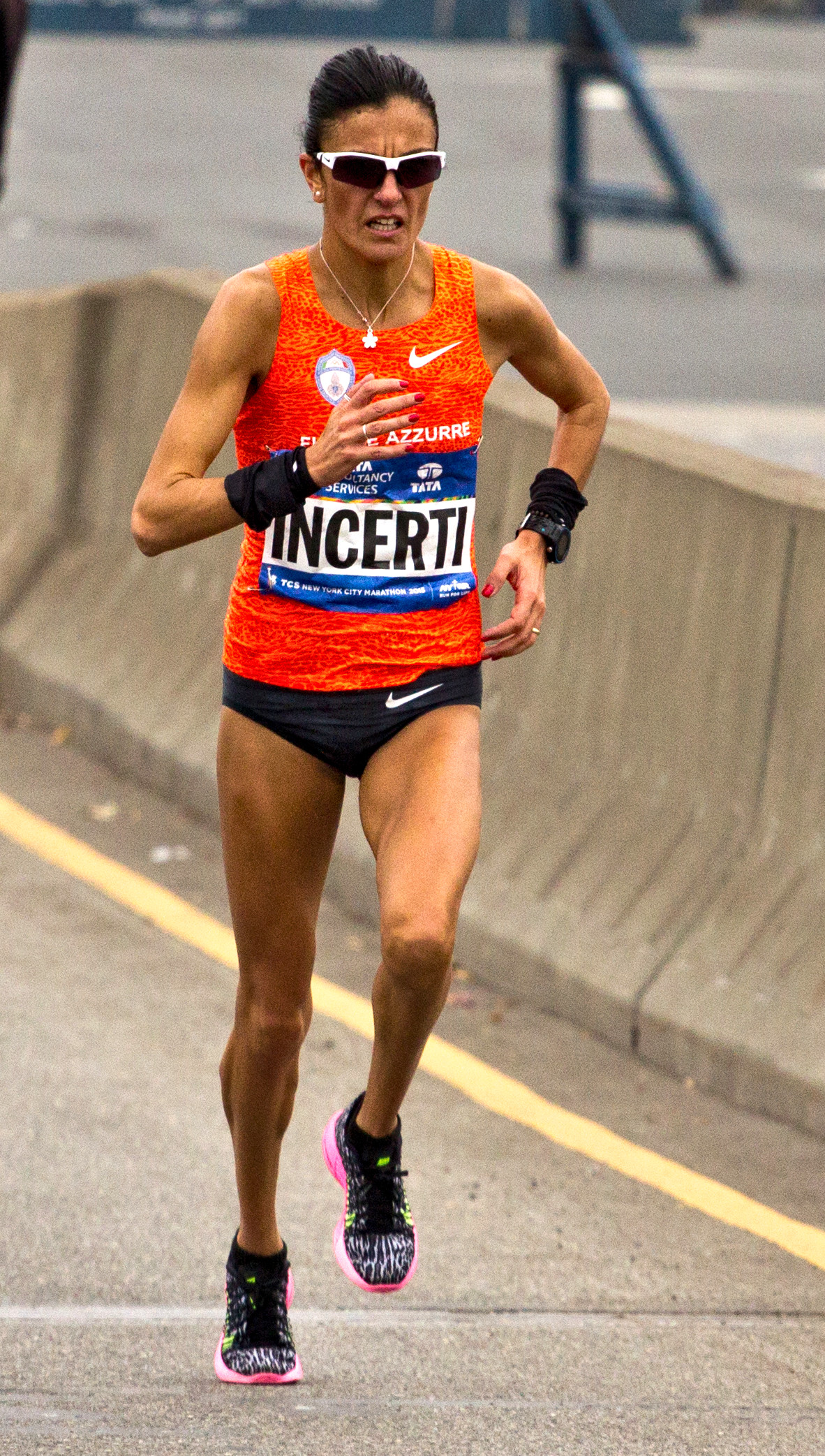
Anna Incerti at 2015 New York City Marathon

She won six national championships.

- Italian Athletics Championships
  - 10,000 metres: 2009 (1)
  - 10 km road: 2015 (1)
  - Half marathon: 2007, 2008, 2019 (3)
  - Marathon: 2003 (1)

== See also ==
- Italian all-time lists - 5000 metres
- Italian all-time lists - Half marathon
- Italian all-time lists - Marathon
- Italian team at the running events
