= Eleni Donta =

Greek marathon runner

Personal information
- Full name: Elena Donta-Bali
- Nationality: Greece
- Born: 17 June 1980 (age 46) Lamia, Greece
- Height: 1.70 m (5 ft 7 in)
- Weight: 52 kg (115 lb)

Sport
- Sport: Athletics
- Event: Marathon
- Club: Iraklis Proponitis (GRE)

Achievements and titles
- Personal best: Marathon: 2:40:42 (2007)

Eleni Donta-Bali (Greek: Ελένη Δοντά-Μπαλή; born 17 June 1980 in Lamia) is a Greek marathon runner. Donta represented Greece at the 2008 Summer Olympics in Beijing, where she competed for the women's marathon. She finished the race in sixtieth place by eighteen seconds ahead of Mexico's Karina Pérez and Colombia's Bertha Sánchez, with a time of 2:46:44.
