= 2003 European 10,000m Challenge =

Running competition in Europe

7th European 10,000m Cup
- Venue: Athens, Greece
- Location: Agios Kosmas Stadium
- Date: 12 April 2003
- Competitors: 66

Champions
- Men: Portugal (1:24:43.85)
- Women: Portugal (1:36:27.97)

The 2003 European 10,000m Cup was the 7th edition of the annual 10,000 metres competition between European athletes, which was held at Agios Kosmas Stadium in Athens, Greece on 12 April. A total of 66 athletes (36 men and 30 women) from 17 European nations entered the competition, plus three Kenyan pacemakers running as guests.

Portugal won both the men's and women's team events with combined times of 1:24:43.85 and 1:36:27.97 hours, led by men's individual runner-up Eduardo Henriques and women's individual winner Fernanda Ribeiro. Ismaïl Sghyr of France won the men's individual race in 27:45.14 minutes.

== Results ==
=== Men's individual ===
| Rank | Athlete | Country | Time |
|---|---|---|---|
| 1st place, gold medalist(s) | Ismaïl Sghyr | France | 27:45.14 |
| 2nd place, silver medalist(s) | Eduardo Henriques | Portugal | 28:05.09 |
| 3rd place, bronze medalist(s) | Juan Carlos de la Ossa | Spain | 28:07.19 |
| 4 | José Ramos | Portugal | 28:15.03 |
| 5 | Marco Mazza | Italy | 28:15.66 |
| 6 | Hélder Ornelas | Portugal | 28:23.73 |
| 7 | Enrique Molina | Spain | 28:26.11 |
| 8 | Erik Sjöqvist | Sweden | 28:32.45 |
| 9 | Aleksandr Vasilyev | Russia | 28:38.57 |
| 10 | Eliseo Martín | Spain | 28:42.90 |
| 11 | Dennis Jensen | Denmark | 28:52.74 |
| 12 | Yuriy Abramov | Russia | 28:54.44 |
| 13 | Slavko Petrović | Croatia | 28:55.12 |
| 14 | Ioannis Kanellopoulos | Greece | 28:55.62 |
| 15 | Giovanni Gualdi | Italy | 29:01.30 |
| 16 | Marco Bartoletti | Italy | 29:09.31 |
| 17 | Mustapha El Ahmadi | France | 29:15.60 |
| 18 | Isaac Viciosa | Spain | 29:25.14 |
| 19 | Christian Nemeth | Belgium | 29:30.12 |
| 20 | Glynn Tromans | United Kingdom | 29:31.44 |
| 21 | Mattia Maccagnan | Italy | 29:32.64 |
| 22 | Simo Wannas | Finland | 29:42.31 |
| 23 | Matthew Smith | United Kingdom | 29:42.45 |
| 24 | Joakim Johansson | Sweden | 29:48.49 |
| 25 | Oliver Bodor | Hungary | 29:56.89 |
| 26 | Marko Kotila | Finland | 30:08.03 |
| 27 | Dmitry Semyonov | Russia | 30:14.41 |
| 28 | Jari Matinlauri | Finland | 30:24.42 |
| 30 | Christos Zarkadas | Greece | 30:43.43 |
| — | Alfredo Brás | Portugal | DNF |
| — | Mustafa Mohamed | Sweden | DNF |
| — | Kent Claesson | Sweden | DNF |
| — | Antonios Papantonis | Greece | DNF |
| — | Frederic Collignon | Belgium | DNF |
| — | Domingos Castro | Portugal | DNF |
| — | Moses Mosop | Kenya | DNF |
| — | Solomon Busendich | Kenya | DNF |

=== Women's individual ===
| Rank | Athlete | Country | Time |
|---|---|---|---|
| 1st place, gold medalist(s) | Fernanda Ribeiro | Portugal | 31:13.42 |
| 2nd place, silver medalist(s) | Irina Mikitenko | Germany | 31:37.15 |
| 3rd place, bronze medalist(s) | Ana Dias | Portugal | 31:38.48 |
| 4 | Helena Javornik | Slovenia | 31:56.90 |
| 5 | Rocío Ríos | Spain | 32:03.99 |
| 6 | María Abel | Spain | 32:20.12 |
| 7 | Liz Yelling | United Kingdom | 32:22.21 |
| 8 | Amaia Piedra | Spain | 32:23.08 |
| 9 | Gloria Marconi | Italy | 32:28.65 |
| 10 | Beatriz Santiago | Spain | 32:33.34 |
| 11 | Hayley Yelling | United Kingdom | 32:37.12 |
| 12 | Rodica Nagel | France | 32:40.70 |
| 13 | Alessandra Aguilar | Spain | 32:42.49 |
| 14 | Dorte Vibjerg | Denmark | 32:42.73 |
| 15 | Agata Balsamo | Italy | 32:49.06 |
| 16 | Charlotte Dale | United Kingdom | 32:52.60 |
| 17 | Silvia Weissteiner | Italy | 32:56.43 |
| 18 | Maria Protopappa | Greece | 33:13.78 |
| 19 | Bente Landøy | Norway | 33:14.75 |
| 20 | Anália Rosa | Portugal | 33:26.23 |
| 21 | Louise Damen | United Kingdom | 33:28.61 |
| 22 | Vera Notz-Umberg | Switzerland | 33:46.69 |
| 23 | Patrizia Tisi | Italy | 33:47.8 |
| 24 | Fátima Cabral | Portugal | 33:50.9 |
| — | Margaret Maury | France | DNF |
| — | Sabrina Mockenhaupt | Germany | DNF |
| — | Hrisostomia Iakovou | Greece | DNF |
| — | Rita Jeptoo | Kenya | DNF |
| — | Mónica Rosa | Portugal | DNF |
| — | Yamna Oubouhou | France | DNF |
| — | Malin Öhrn | Sweden | DNF |

=== Men's team ===
| Rank | Nation | Total time |
|---|---|---|
| 1st place, gold medalist(s) | Portugal; Eduardo Henriques (28:05.09); José Ramos (28:15.03); Hélder Ornelas (28:23.73); Alfredo Brás DNF; Domingos Castro DNF | 1:24:43.85 |
| 2nd place, silver medalist(s) | Spain; Juan Carlos de la Ossa (28:07.19); Enrique Molina (28:26.11); Eliseo Martín (28:42.90); Isaac Viciosa (29:25.14) | 1:25:16.20 |
| 3rd place, bronze medalist(s) | Italy; Marco Mazza (28:15.66); Giovanni Gualdi (29:01.30); Marco Bartoletti (29:09.31); Mattia Maccagnan (29:32.64) | 1:26:26.27 |
| 4 | Russia; Aleksandr Vasilyev (28:38.57); Yuriy Abramov (28:54.44); Dmitry Semyonov (30:14.41) | 1:27:07.41 |
| 5 | Finland; Simo Wannas (29:42.31); Marko Kotila (30:08.03); Jari Matinlauri (30:24.42) | 1:30:14.76 |

Athletes in italics did not score for their team but received medals

=== Women's team ===
| Rank | Nation | Total time |
|---|---|---|
| 1st place, gold medalist(s) | Portugal; Fernanda Ribeiro (31:13.42); Ana Dias (31:38.48); Anália Rosa (33:26.23); Fátima Cabral (33:50.9); Mónica Rosa DNF | 1:36:27.97 |
| 2nd place, silver medalist(s) | Spain; Rocío Ríos (32:03.99); María Abel (32:20.12); Amaia Piedra (32:23.08); Beatriz Santiago (32:33.34); Alessandra Aguilar (32:42.49) | 1:36:47.19 |
| 3rd place, bronze medalist(s) | United Kingdom; Liz Yelling (32:22.21); Hayley Yelling (32:37.12); Charlotte Dale (32:52.60); Louise Damen (33:28.61) | 1:37:11.93 |
| 4 | Italy; Gloria Marconi (32:28.65); Agata Balsamo (32:49.06); Silvia Weissteiner (32:56.43); Patrizia Tisi (33:47.8) | 1:37:34.14 |

Athletes in italics did not score for their team but received medals
