= 2006 European Marathon Cup =

2006 Marathon competition held in Gothenburg, Sweden

The 2006 European Marathon Cup was the eighth edition of the European Marathon Cup of athletics and were held in Gothenburg, Sweden, inside of the 2006 European Championships.

== Results ==
Team men
#	Nations	Time
1	Italy	6:39:21
2	Portugal	6:43:32
3	Netherlands	6:43:41

Team women
#	Nations	Time
1	Italy	7:34:50
2	Russia	7:37:42
2	Germany	7:40:11

Individual men
Rank	Name	Nationality	Time	Notes
1st place, gold medalist(s)	Stefano Baldini	Italy	2:11:32	
2nd place, silver medalist(s)	Viktor Röthlin	Switzerland	2:11:50	
3rd place, bronze medalist(s)	Julio Rey	Spain	2:12:37	
4	Luc Krotwaar	Netherlands	2:12:44	
5	Francesco Ingargiola	Italy	2:13:04	
6	Dmitriy Semyonov	Russia	2:13:09	
7	Janne Holmén	Finland	2:13:10	
8	Alberto Chaíça	Portugal	2:13:14	
9	Kamiel Maase	Netherlands	2:13:46	
10	Luís Jesus	Portugal	2:14:15	

Individual women
Rank	Name	Nationality	Time	Notes
1st place, gold medalist(s)	Ulrike Maisch	Germany	2:30:01	PB
2nd place, silver medalist(s)	Olivera Jevtić	Serbia	2:30:27	
3rd place, bronze medalist(s)	Irina Permitina	Russia	2:30:53	
4	Živilė Balčiūnaitė	Lithuania	2:31:01	SB
5	Bruna Genovese	Italy	2:31:15	
6	Alevtina Biktimirova	Russia	2:31:23	
7	Deborah Toniolo	Italy	2:31:31	
8	Giovanna Volpato	Italy	2:32:04	
9	Anna Incerti	Italy	2:32:53	PB
10	Anália Rosa	Portugal	2:32:56	PB

== See also ==
- 2006 European Athletics Championships – Men's Marathon
- 2006 European Athletics Championships – Women's Marathon
