= Oksana Sklyarenko =

Ukrainian marathon runner

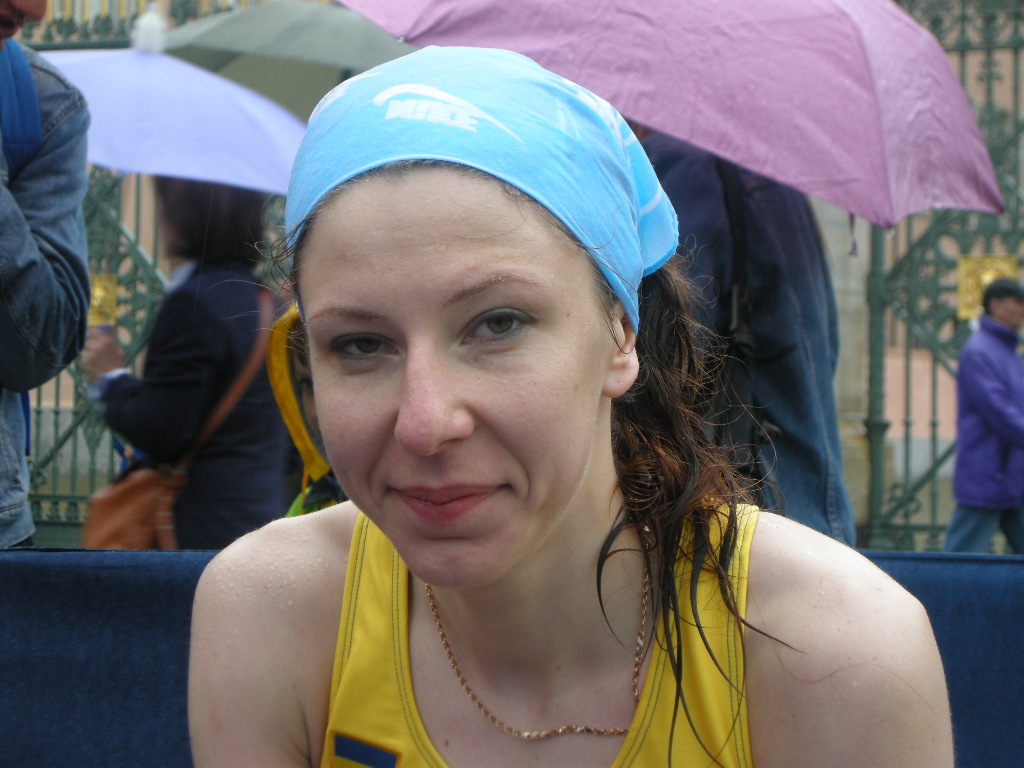
- Oksana Sklyarenko at 2009 Turin Marathon

Personal information
- Full name: Oksana Serhiïvna Sklyarenko
- Nationality: Ukraine
- Born: 4 May 1981 (age 45) Novomoskovsk, Dnipropetrovsk Oblast, Ukrainian SSR, Soviet Union
- Height: 1.68 m (5 ft 6 in)
- Weight: 49 kg (108 lb)

Sport
- Sport: Athletics
- Event: Marathon
- Club: Ukraina Dnipropetrovska

Achievements and titles
- Personal bests: Half-marathon: 1:17:05 (2005); Marathon: 2:36:14 (2008)

Oksana Serhiïvna Sklyarenko (Ukrainian: Оксана Сергіївна Скляренко; born May 4, 1981, in Novomoskovsk, Dnipropetrovsk Oblast) is a Ukrainian marathon runner. In 2008, she set a personal best time of 2:36:14, by winning the bronze medal in the Turin Marathon.

Sklyarenko represented Ukraine at the 2008 Summer Olympics in Beijing, where she competed for the women's marathon, along with her compatriot Tetyana Filonyuk. She finished the race in sixty-ninth place by two minutes behind Costa Rica's Gabriela Traña, with a time of 2:55:39.
