= Athletics at the 2009 Summer Universiade – Women's 10,000 metres =

The women's 10,000 metres event at the 2009 Summer Universiade was held on 7 July.

== Results ==
Rank	Name	Nationality	Time	Notes
1st place, gold medalist(s)	Kasumi Nishihara	Japan	33:14.62	
2nd place, silver medalist(s)	Tatiana Shutova	Russia	33:29.99	PB
3rd place, bronze medalist(s)	Volha Minina	Belarus	33:32.35	
4	Seika Nishikawa	Japan	33:56.62	
5	Alexandra Becker	Canada	34:31.69	
6	Zang Fengmin	China	34:39.18	
7	Kim Jong-hyang	North Korea	34:42.62	
8	Azra Eminović	Serbia	35:05.25	
9	Cheng Jiali	China	35:17.08	
10	Jane Kipchana	Uganda	37:50.07	
