= Athletics at the 2003 Summer Universiade – Women's 10,000 metres =

The women's 10,000 metres event at the 2003 Summer Universiade was held on 25 August in Daegu, South Korea.

== Results ==
Rank	Athlete	Nationality	Time	Notes
1st place, gold medalist(s)	Natalia Cercheș	Moldova	33:37.05	
2nd place, silver medalist(s)	Alena Samokhvalova	Russia	33:40.57	
3rd place, bronze medalist(s)	Anna Incerti	Italy	33:49.71	
4	Inês Monteiro	Portugal	34:10.65	
5	Tomoko Horioka	Japan	34:12.37	
6	Zhang Yuhong	China	34:57.12	
7	Valentina Levushkina	Russia	34:58.35	
8	Iryna Kunakhavets	Belarus	36:25.39	
9	Eleni Gebremedhin	Ethiopia	37:39.44	
10	Lisa Blommé	Sweden	39:31.22	
	Lucélia Peres	Brazil	DNF	
	Emi Ikeda	Japan	DNF	
