= Isabellah Andersson =

Swedish-Kenyan distance runner

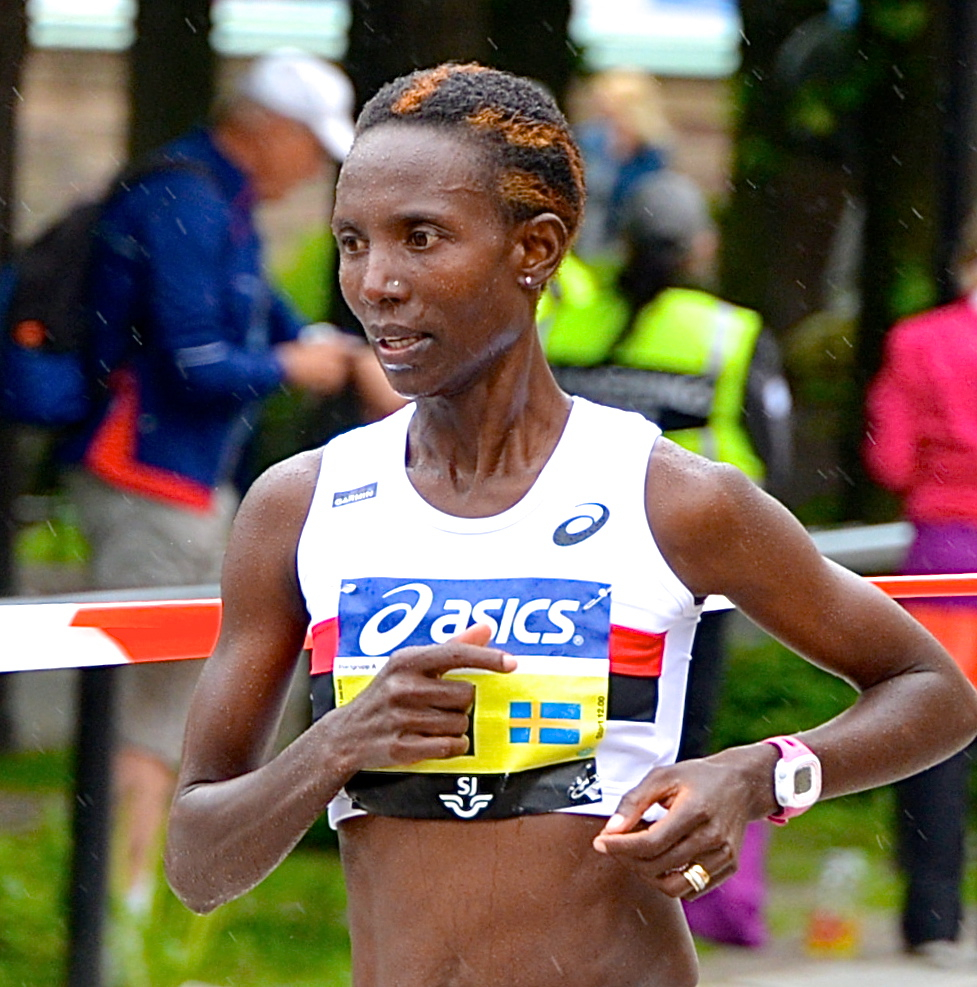
- Isabellah Andersson at Stockholm Marathon 2013.

Personal information
- Born: Isabellah Moraa Amoro; 12 November 1980 (age 45) Kenya
- Height: 1.7 m (5 ft 7 in)
- Weight: 55 kg (121 lb)

Sport
- Country: Sweden
- Sport: Athletics
- Event: Marathon
Medal record
European Championships
Bronze medal – third place	2010 Barcelona	Marathon

Isabellah Andersson (born Isabellah Moraa Amoro on 12 November 1980) is a Swedish-Kenyan distance runner. She resides in Vilshult in Sweden, and since May 2009 is a Swedish citizen. She competes for the club Hässelby SK.

== Career ==
Andersson became the new Swedish marathon record holder on 22 January 2010 when she placed fifth in the Dubai Marathon with a time of 2:26:52. In the 2010 European Championship she originally finished 5th, but was promoted to third in 2012. On 31 October 2010, she finished fourth in the Frankfurt Marathon with a time of 2:25:10 hours, thus setting a new national record. She has won the Stockholm Marathon four times in a row. She ran at the 2011 Dubai Marathon and came in third, improving her record time to 2:23:41 hours. At the 2011 World Championships, she came in seventh. At the 2012 Summer Olympics, she finished eighteenth.

She originally came to Sweden to learn more about the sport foot orienteering. There, she met Lars Andersson, a foot orienteering enthusiast and competitor. The two married in October 2006 and have a daughter Beyoncé (born 2009), named after the American singer Beyoncé Knowles.

On 10 April 2016, due to leg pain, she had to forfeit participating in the Rotterdam Marathon in the Netherlands. This, in turn, led to her missing the 2016 Olympic Summer Games in Rio de Janeiro, Brazil.

== Achievements ==
- Etape Bornholm -- 2009 - victory and Swedish record in 10 km event
- Stockholm Marathon -- 2008 - victory; 2009 - victory; 2010 - victory; 2011 - victory; 2013 - victory; 2014 - victory.
- Göteborgsvarvet -- 2008 - 2nd place; 2009 - 2nd place; 2010 - 2nd place
- Terräng-SM/Cross country championships -- 2008 - placed first in both the 4 km and 8 km events
- Lidingöloppet -- 2007 - placed first in 30 km event
- 2010 European Athletics Championships, Barcelona—in marathon, placed 3rd and earned bronze medal, with a time of 2:34:43

== Personal bests ==
- 5000 m - 15:45.08 - SM, Malmo 2009
- 10 000 m - 33:15.25 - Stockholm, 2013
- 10 km road - 32:24 - Etape Bornholm, 2009, Swedish record
- Half marathon - 1:10:02 - "Venloop" in Dutch Venlo in 2010, Swedish record
- Marathon - 2:23:41 - Dubai Marathon, 2011, Swedish record
