= Giovanna Volpato =

Italian long-distance runner

Personal information
- Nationality: Italian
- Born: August 20, 1975 (age 50) Mestre, Italy
- Height: 1.69 m (5 ft 6 1/2 in)
- Weight: 48 kg (106 lb)

Sport
- Country: Italy
- Sport: Athletics
- Event: Marathon
- Club: Assindustria Sport Padova

Achievements and titles
- Personal best: Marathon: 2:28:59 (2006)
Medal record
European Marathon Cup
Gold medal – first place	2006 Gothenburg	Team marathon

Giovanna Volpato (born August 20, 1975, in Mestre) is a female long-distance runner from Italy who specializes in the marathon.

== Biography ==
She finished twelfth at the 2002 European Athletics Championships and eighth at the 2006 European Athletics Championships, the latter in a personal best time of 2:32:04 hours.

== Achievements ==
Year	Competition	Venue	Position	Event	Notes
2002	European Championships	Munich, Germany	12th	Marathon	2:38:15
2003	World Championships	Paris, France	43rd	Marathon	2:38:38
2006	European Championships	Gothenburg, Sweden	8th	Marathon	2:32:04
2008	Florence Marathon	Florence, Italy	1st	Marathon	2:34:13

== See also ==
- Italian all-time top lists - Marathon
