= Karolina Jarzyńska =

Polish long-distance runner (born 1981)

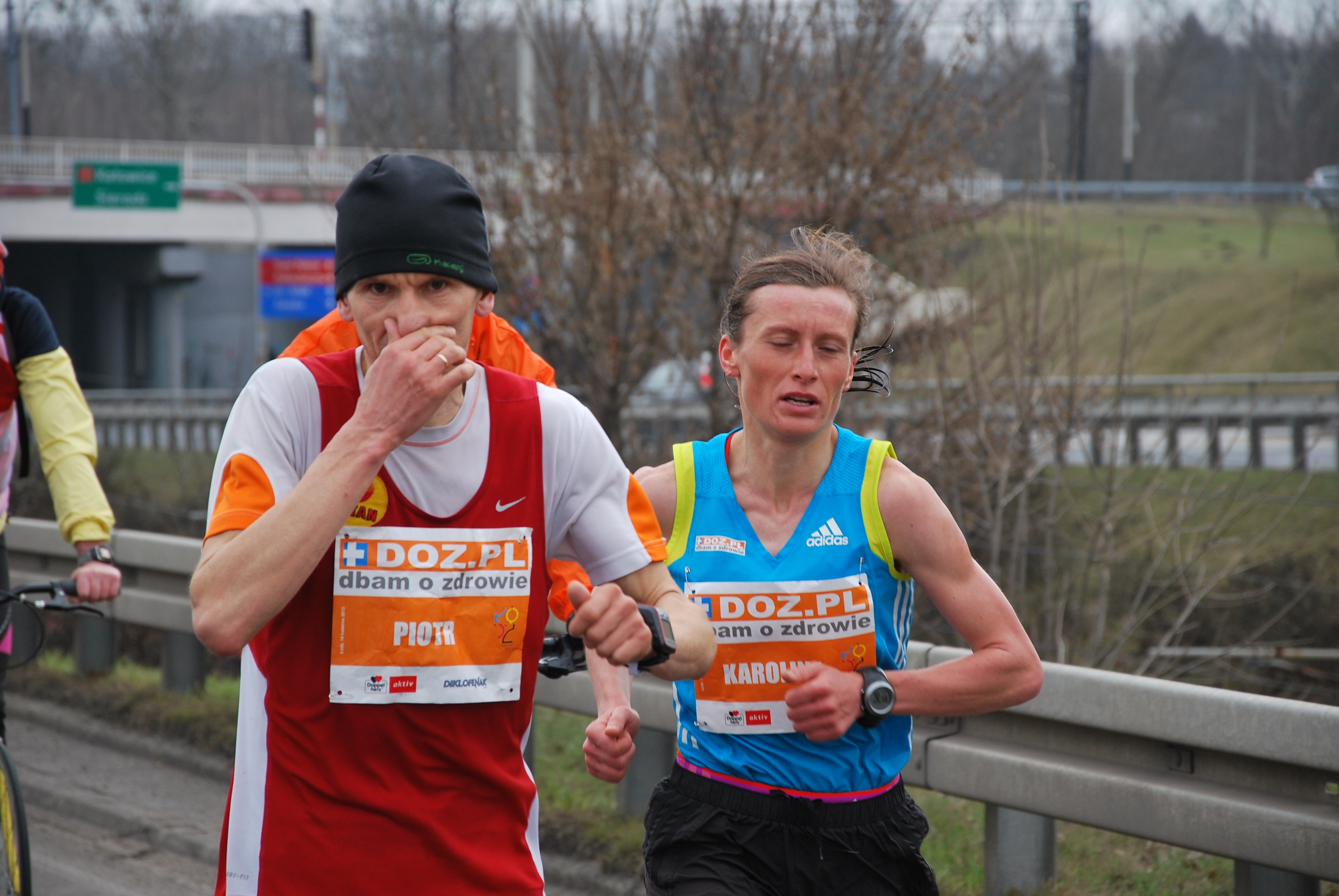
- Karolina Jarzyńska in 2013

Personal information
- Born: September 6, 1981 (age 44) Oleśnica, Poland
- Height: 1.64 m (5 ft 4 1/2 in)
- Weight: 53 kg (117 lb)

Sport
- Country: Poland
- Sport: Athletics
- Event: Marathon
- Club: MKL Toruń
- Coached by: Zbigniew Nadolski

Karolina Jarzyńska-Nadolska (born September 6, 1981, in Oleśnica) is a Polish long-distance runner. She competed in the marathon at the 2012 Summer Olympics, placing 36th with a time of 2:30:57.

She also represented her country at the 2010 European Athletics Championships, but did not finish the marathon distance. She took a career break from mid-2014 to late-2015 to have a child and returned to competition in late 2015.

Jarzyńska set a Polish record for the event in 2013 by winning the Łódź Marathon in a time of 2:26:44 hours.

== Competition record ==
Year	Competition	Venue	Position	Event	Notes
Representing Poland
2003	European U23 Championships	Bydgoszcz, Poland	14th	10,000 m	35:20.92
2010	European Championships	Barcelona, Spain	–	Marathon	DNF
2010	World Half Marathon Championships	Nanning, China	17th	Half marathon	1:12:36
2012	Olympic Games	London, United Kingdom	36th	Marathon	2:30:57
2012	World Half Marathon Championships	Kavarna, Bulgaria	20th	Half marathon	1:13:45
2013	World Championships	Moscow, Russia	15th	10,000 m	32:54.15
2014	European Championships	Zürich, Switzerland	13th	10,000 m	32:40.98
2021	Olympic Games	Sapporo, Japan	14th	Marathon	2:32:04
