= Kasumi Nishihara =

Japanese long-distance runner

Kasumi Nishihara (西原 加純, Nishihara Kasumi; born 1 March 1989) is a Japanese athlete specialising in the long-distance events. She won two medals at the 2009 Summer Universiade – the gold in the 10,000 metres and the silver in the 5000 metres.

== International competitions ==
Representing Japan
Year	Competition	Venue	Position	Event	Notes
2008	Asian Junior Championships	Jakarta, Indonesia	2nd	5000 m	17:11.14
2008	World Junior Championships	Bydgoszcz, Poland	5th	5000 m	16:33.28
2009	Universiade	Belgrade, Serbia	2nd	5000 m	15:46.95
2009	Universiade	Belgrade, Serbia	1st	10,000 m	33:14.62
2014	Asian Games	Incheon, South Korea	8th	10,000 m	32:41.49
2015	World Championships	Beijing, China	13th	10,000 m	32:12.95

== Personal bests ==
Outdoor

- 3000 metres – 9:15.9 (Kyoto 2006)
- 5000 metres – 15:23.80 (Yamaguchi 2011)
- 10,000 metres – 31:53.69 (Kobe 2014)
- 10 kilometres – 32:26 (Okayama 2010)
- Half marathon – 1:11:58 (Kyoto 2009)
