= Nailiya Yulamanova =

Russian long-distance runner

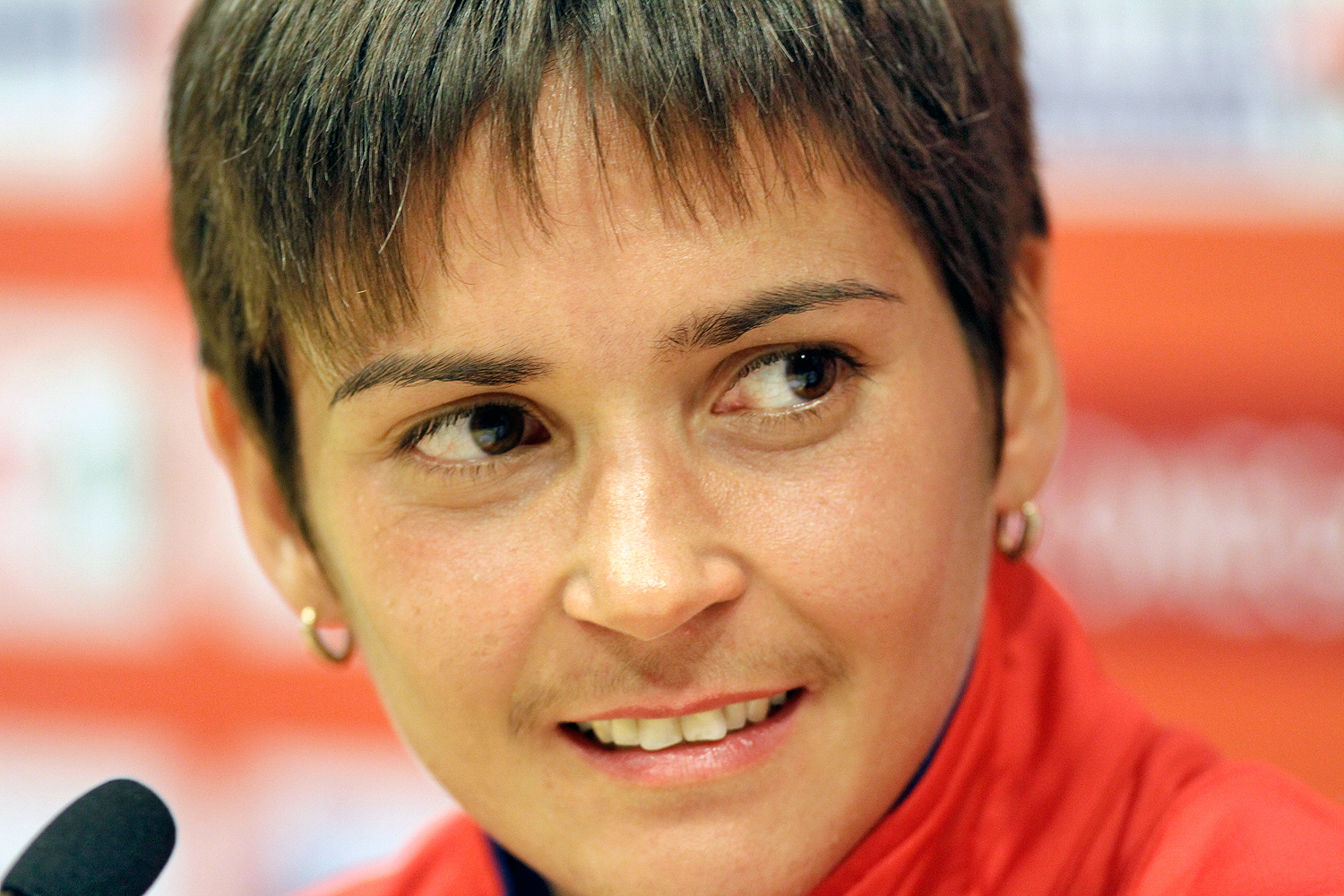
Nailiya Yulamanova

Nailiya Yulamanova (Russian: Наиля Гайнуловна Юламанова; born 6 September 1980) is a Russian long-distance runner who specializes in the marathon.

She won the Saransk Marathon in 2006 and went on to finish twelfth at the 2006 European Championships and 32nd at the 2007 World Championships.

Yulamanova won the Prague International Marathon in 2007 and 2008, the Istanbul Marathon in 2008 and the Rotterdam Marathon in 2009. She competed in the women's marathon at the 2009 World Championships in Athletics and finished eighth overall, the second best European finisher after Marisa Barros of Portugal.

She placed ninth at the 2010 Boston Marathon, but went on to finish in second position behind Lithuania's Živilė Balčiūnaitė in the women's marathon at the 2010 European Athletics Championships, which led Russia to the title of the European Marathon Cup. Yulamanova was subsequently awarded the gold medal after Balčiūnaitė was disqualified for a doping offence.

She won the Shanghai Marathon in December in a new personal best of 2:26:05. Initially set for the 2011 Berlin Marathon, she instead chose the Amsterdam Marathon and came fifth with a time of 2:26:39 hours.

She was given a two-year ban from competition, lasting from 10 February 2012 to 2014. Abnormalities in her biological passport showed proof that she had committed doping offences. Her results were annulled from 20 August 2009 until the date of the ban. This period included her European marathon title win and her personal best-setting run in Shanghai.

== International competitions ==
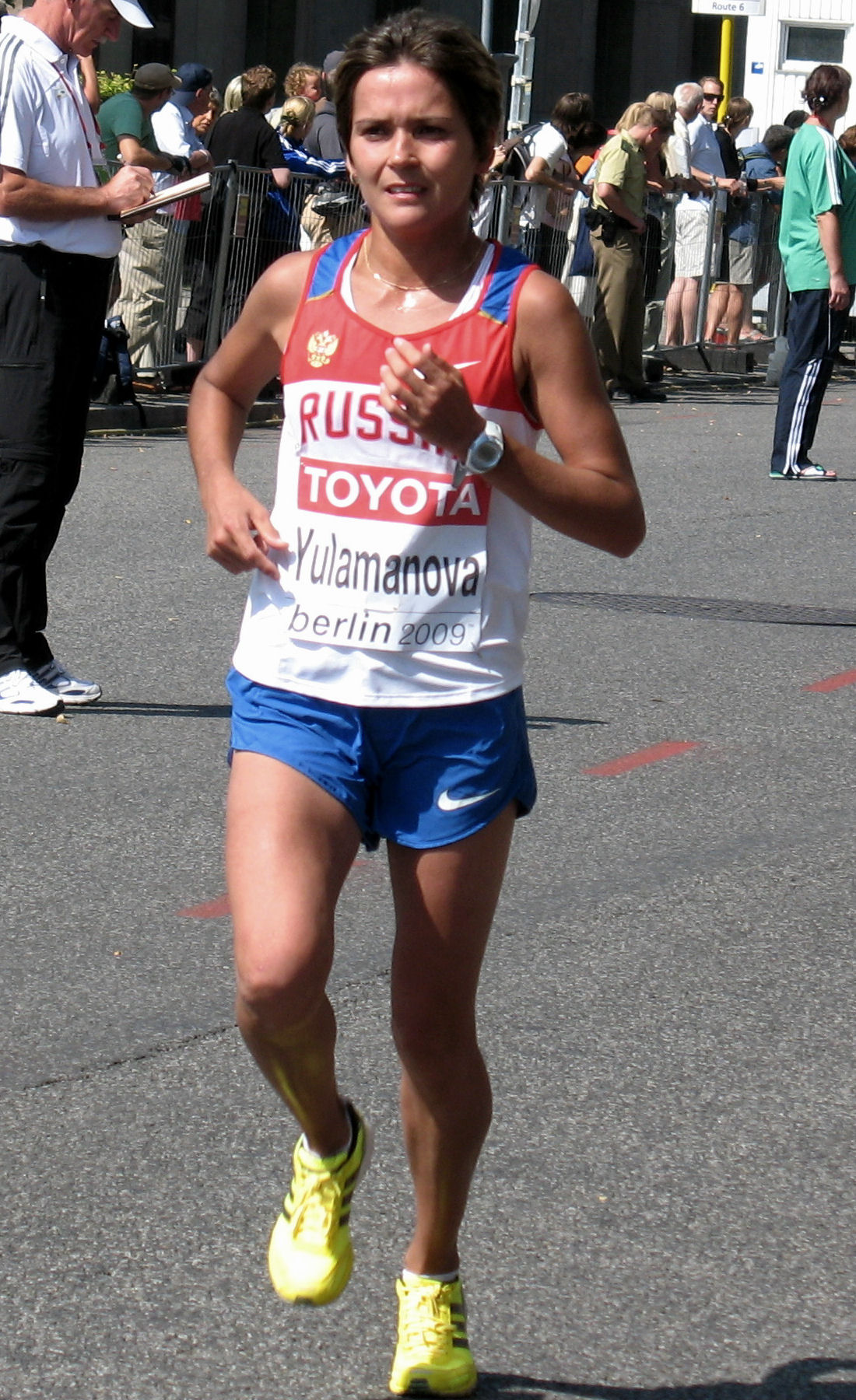
Yulamanova in the marathon at the 2009 World Championships

Representing Russia
Year	Competition	Venue	Position	Event	Result	Notes
2006	European Championships	Gothenburg, Sweden	12th	Marathon	2:35:26	
2009	World Championships	Berlin, Germany	DQ (8th)	Marathon	2:27:08	Doping
2010	European Championships	Barcelona, Spain	DQ (1st)	Marathon	2:32:15	Doping

== Professional marathons ==
Year	Competition	Venue	Position	Result	Notes
2007	Prague Marathon	Prague, Czech Republic	1st	2:33:10	
2008	Prague Marathon	Prague, Czech Republic	1st	2:31:43	
2008	Istanbul Marathon	Istanbul, Turkey	1st	2:30:17	
2009	Rotterdam Marathon	Rotterdam, Netherlands	1st	2:26:30	
2010	Shanghai Marathon	Shanghai, China	DQ (1st)	2:26:05	Doping

== See also ==
- List of doping cases in athletics
- Russia at the World Athletics Championships
- Doping at the World Athletics Championships
- Marathons at the World Championships in Athletics
- List of stripped European Athletics Championships medals
