= Bruna Genovese =

Italian long-distance runner

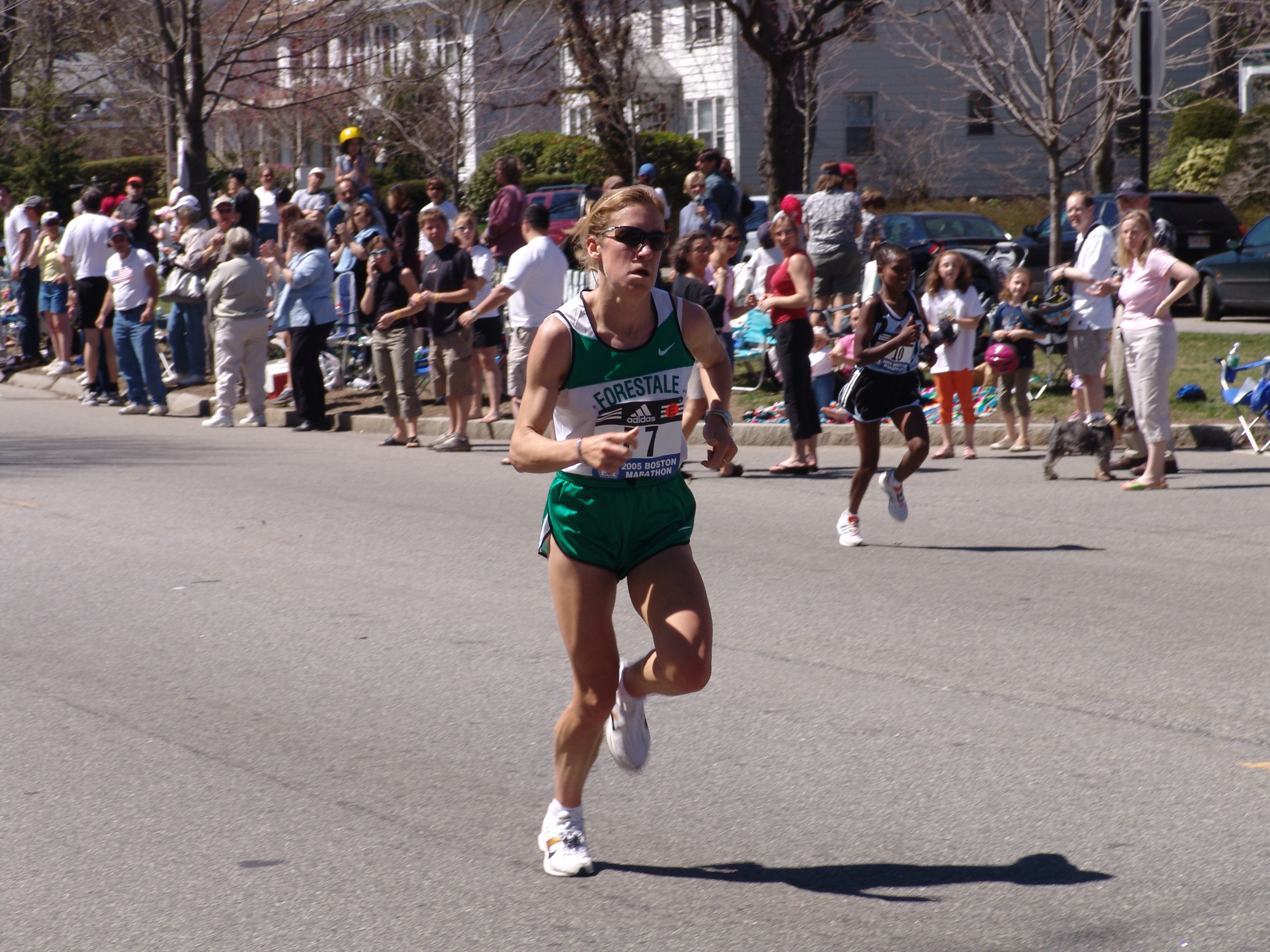
- Bruna Genovese during 2005 Boston Marathon

Personal information
- Nationality: Italian
- Born: September 24, 1976 (age 49) Montebelluna, Italy
- Height: 1.61 m (5 ft 3 1/2 in)
- Weight: 50 kg (110 lb)

Sport
- Country: Italy
- Sport: Athletics
- Event: Marathon
- Club: G.S. Forestale
- Coached by: Salvatore Bettiol

Achievements and titles
- Personal bests: Half marathon: 1:11.22 (2005); Marathon: 2:25.28 (2006)
Medal record
European Marathon Cup
Gold medal – first place	2006 Gothenburg	Team marathon
International Marathons
Event	1st	2nd	3rd
Tokyo Marathon	1	0	1
Rome Marathon	0	1	0
Boston Marathon	0	0	1
Venice Marathon	0	0	1
Turin Marathon	0	0	1

Bruna Genovese (born 24 September 1976 in Montebelluna) is an Italian long-distance runner who specializes in the marathon race.

== Biography ==
Genovese won the Italian under 21 half-marathon championship in 1998. She ran her first marathon on 24 October 1999 in Venice, and won the 2004 Tokyo International Marathon with Kiyoko Shimahara finishing second and Elfenesh Alemu third.

== Achievements ==
- All results regarding marathon, unless stated otherwise

Year	Competition	Venue	Position	Notes
1999	Venice Marathon	Venice, Italy	3rd	2:31:06
2001	Boston Marathon	Boston, United States	9th	2:30:39
2001	World Championships	Edmonton, Canada	17th	2:33:13
2001	Tokyo International Marathon	Tokyo, Japan	3rd	2:25:35
2002	Boston Marathon	Boston, United States	6th	2:29:02
2003	Tokyo International Marathon	Tokyo, Japan	4th	2:34:32
2004	Rome Marathon	Rome, Italy	2nd	2:29:03
2004	Olympic Games	Athens, Greece	10th	2:32:50
2004	Tokyo International Marathon	Tokyo, Japan	1st	2:26:34
2005	Boston Marathon	Boston, United States	3rd	2:29:51
2005	New York City Marathon	New York City, United States	5th	2:27:15
2006	Boston Marathon	Boston, United States	4th	2:25:28
2006	European Championships	Gothenburg, Sweden	6th	2:31:15
2008	Boston Marathon	Boston, United States	6th	2:30:52
2008	Olympic Games	Beijing, PR China	17th	2:31:31
2009	Turin Marathon	Turin, Italy	3rd	2:30:51
2009	Yokohama Marathon	Yokohama, Japan	4th	2:29:57
2010	Boston Marathon	Boston, United States	5th	2:29:12

== Personal bests ==
- 10,000 metres - 33:36.03 min (2005)
- Half marathon - 1:11:22 hrs (2005)
- Marathon - 2:25:28 hrs (2006)

== See also ==
- Italian all-time lists - Half marathon
- Italian all-time lists - Marathon
