= North Korea at the 2009 World Championships in Athletics =

- WA code: PRK

in Berlin
- Competitors: 6
- Medals: Gold 0 Silver 0 Bronze 0 Total 0

World Championships in Athletics appearances
- 1983; 1987–1997; 1999; 2001; 2003; 2005; 2007; 2009; 2011; 2013; 2015; 2017; 2019; 2022; 2023

North Korea competes at the 2009 World Championships in Athletics from 15–23 August in Berlin.

== Team selection ==
Event	Athletes	
Event	Men	Women
Marathon	Pak Song-Chol; Hyon U Ri	Jong Yong-Ok; Chol Sun Kim; Kim Kum-Ok; Un Suk Phyo

== Results ==
=== Men ===
Event	Athletes	Final	
Event	Athletes	Result	Rank
Marathon	Pak Song-Chol	2:21:12	43
Marathon	Hyon U Ri	2:22:48	51

=== Women ===
Event	Athletes	Final	
Event	Athletes	Result	Rank
Marathon	Jong Yong-Ok	2:38:29	33
Marathon	Chol Sun Kim	2:42:18	48
Marathon	Kim Kum-Ok	2:31:24	20
Marathon	Un Suk Phyo	2:40:39	42
