= Dmitry Semyonov =

Russian long-distance runner

Dmitriy Semyonov (Russian: Дмитрий Семенов; born 4 February 1975) is a Russian long-distance runner. He finished sixth in the marathon at the 2006 European Athletics Championships in Gothenburg. He also represented his country at the European Cross Country Championships in 2001 and the IAAF World Half Marathon Championships in 2008.

He won the 10,000 metres national title at the 2001 Russian Athletics Championships, and won the 15K run title at the 2005 Russian Athletics Championships.

== International competitions ==
Year	Competition	Venue	Position	Event	Notes
2001	European 10,000m Cup - B Race	Barakaldo, Spain	—	10,000 m	DNF
2001	European Cross Country Championships	Thun, Switzerland	44th	Senior race	29:11
2001	European Cross Country Championships	Thun, Switzerland	8th	Senior team	160 pts
2001	International Chiba Ekiden	Chiba, Japan	6th	10K (3rd leg)	29:25
2001	International Chiba Ekiden	Chiba, Japan	4th	Team	2:02:18
2002	European 10,000m Cup - B Race	Camaiore, Italy	3rd	10,000 m	28:45.35
2003	European 10,000m Cup	Athens, Greece	27th	10,000 m	30:14.41
2006	European Championships	Gothenburg, Sweden	6th	Marathon	2:13:09
2006	European Championships	Gothenburg, Sweden	4th	Team	6:45:18
2008	World Half Marathon Championships	Rio de Janeiro, Brazil	43rd	Half marathon	1:07:40
2008	World Half Marathon Championships	Rio de Janeiro, Brazil	9th	Team	3:18:12
