= Athletics at the 2009 Summer Universiade – Women's 5000 metres =

The women's 5000 metres event at the 2009 Summer Universiade was held on 9–11 July.

== Results ==
Rank	Name	Nationality	Time	Notes
1st place, gold medalist(s)	Sara Moreira	Portugal	15:32.78	
2nd place, silver medalist(s)	Kasumi Nishihara	Japan	15:46.95	SB
3rd place, bronze medalist(s)	Natalya Medvedeva	Russia	15:49.60	
4	Sonia Bejarano	Spain	15:51.69	SB
5	Azra Eminović	Serbia	16:00.92	
6	Alfiya Khasanova	Russia	16:03.00	
7	Kazue Kojima	Japan	16:03.45	
8	Dudu Karakaya	Turkey	16:10.66	PB
9	Linda Byrne	Ireland	16:12.54	
10	Tetyana Filonyuk	Ukraine	16:12.75	
11	Lenka Všetečková	Czech Republic	16:25.85	
12	Oana Andreea Mircea	Romania	16:37.21	PB
13	Cheng Jiali	China	16:58.54	
14	Laila Kærgaard Laursen	Denmark	17:06.82	SB
15	Marie-Louise Brasen	Denmark	17:33.06	
	Mary Chebet	Uganda	DNS	
	Jane Kipchana	Uganda	DNS	
