= Kate Smyth =

Australian marathon runner

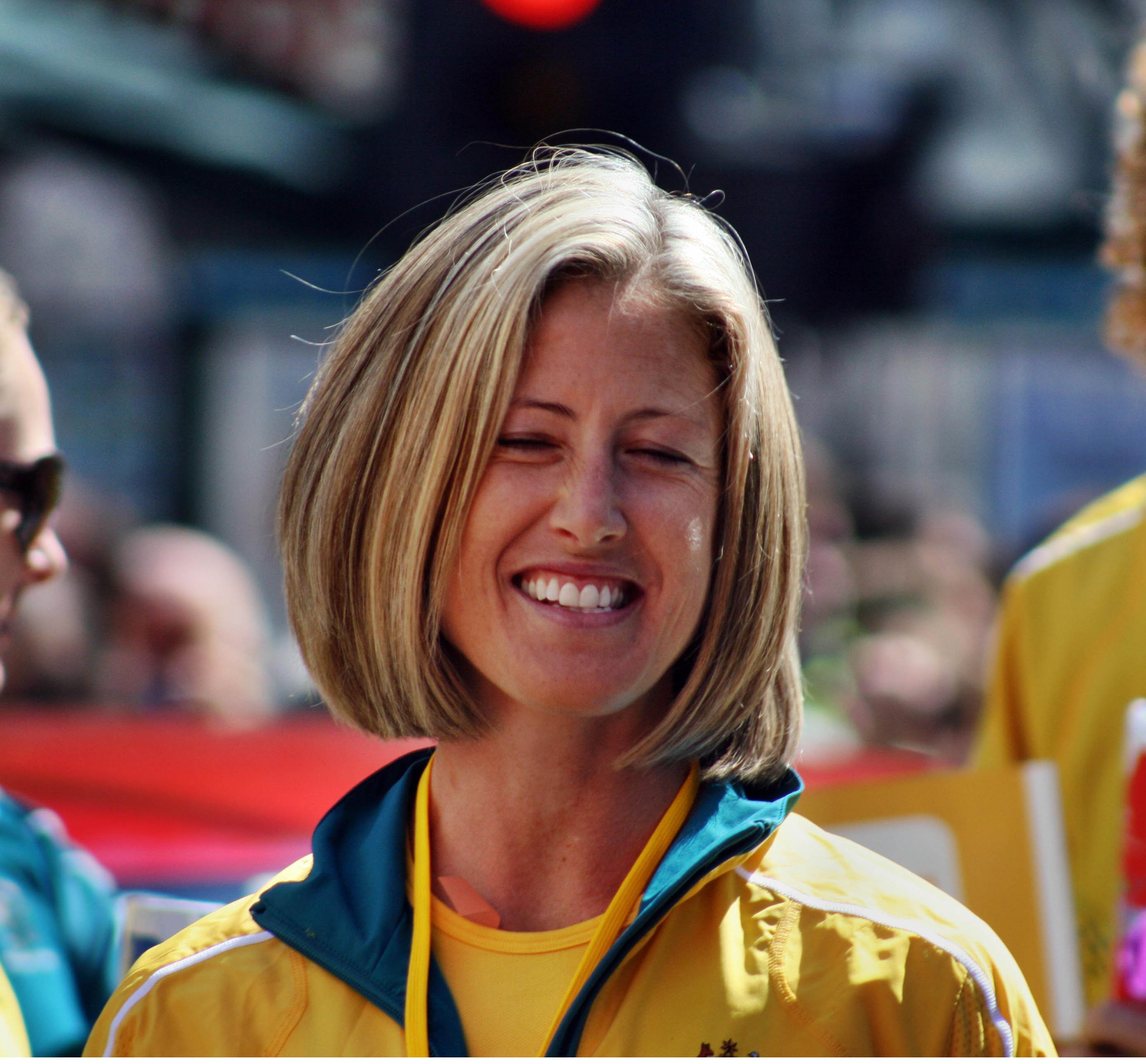
- 2008 by Sarah Ewart

Personal information
- Full name: Kate Harris-Smyth
- Nationality: Australia
- Born: 22 September 1972 (age 53) Cowra, New South Wales, Australia
- Height: 1.65 m (5 ft 5 in)
- Weight: 50 kg (110 lb)

Sport
- Sport: Athletics
- Event: Marathon
- Club: Glenhuntly Athletics Club
- Coached by: John Bowden and Shaun Creighton

Achievements and titles
- Olympic finals: 2008 Summer Olympics -Beijing, China
- National finals: Australian Athletics National Championships, 10,000 mtrs, 1st -New Zealand National Championships 10,000mtrs
- Highest world ranking: 1st- fastest time by a female marathoner in Australia in 2008
- Personal bests: Half-marathon: 1:13:08 (2007); Marathon: 2:28:51 (2008)

Kate Harris-Smyth (born 22 September 1972 in Cowra, New South Wales) is an Australian marathon runner. She set her personal best time of 2:28:51, by finishing second at the 2008 Nagano Olympic Commemorative Marathon in Japan.

At age thirty-five, Smyth made her official debut for the 2008 Summer Olympics in Beijing, where she competed in the women's marathon, along with her teammates Benita Johnson and Lisa Weightman. She also ran in the marathon at the 2006 Commonwealth Games, coming in seventh place after collapsing with heat stroke.
