= Marie Söderström-Lundberg =

Swedish long-distance runner (born 1960)

Personal information
- Born: 21 October 1960 (age 65)

Sport
- Country: Sweden
- Sport: Long-distance running

Marie Söderström-Lundberg (born 21 October 1960) is a Swedish long-distance runner. In 2001, she competed in the women's marathon at the 2001 World Championships in Athletics held in Edmonton, Alberta, Canada. She finished in 24th place.

In 1999, she competed in the women's marathon at the 1999 World Championships in Athletics held in Seville, Spain. She finished in 18th place. In 2003, she competed in the women's marathon at the 2003 World Championships in Athletics held in Paris, France. She finished in 26th place.
