= Marisa Barros =

Portuguese long-distance runner

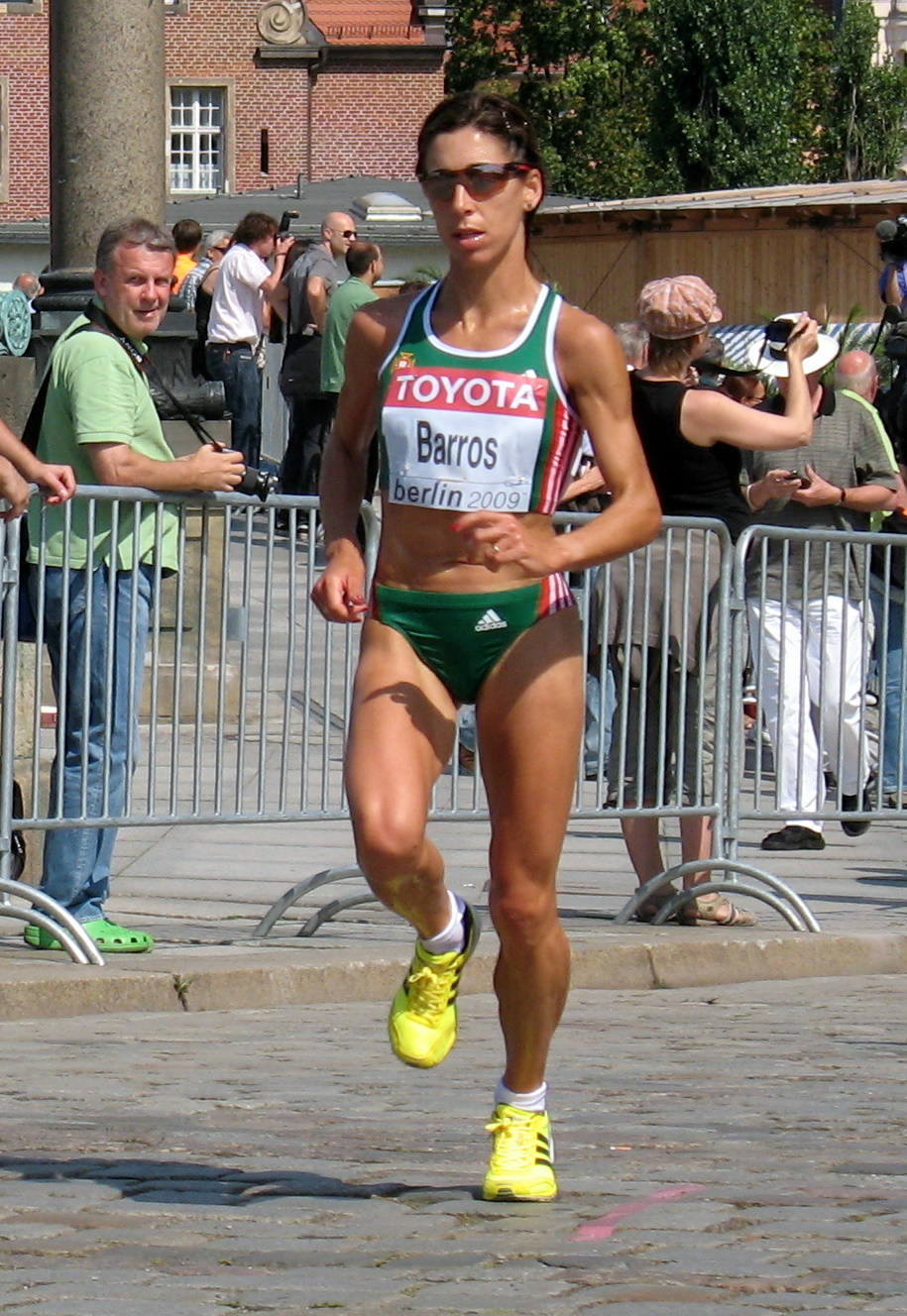
- Barros running in the World Championships Marathon in 2009

Personal information
- Full name: Elsa Marisa Branco Barros
- Born: 25 February 1980 (age 46) Paços de Ferreira, Portugal
- Height: 1.60 m (5 ft 3 in)
- Weight: 50 kg (110 lb)

Sport
- Country: Portugal
- Sport: Athletics
- Event: Marathon

Elsa Marisa Branco Barros ComM (born 25 February 1980), known as Marisa Barros, is a Portuguese long-distance runner who specialises in marathon running. Her personal best for the distance is 2:25:04 hours.

She ran for her country at the Summer Olympics in 2008 and 2012 and ranked in the top ten in the marathon at World Championships in Athletics in 2009 and 2011. On the road circuit, she has won marathons in Porto and Seville.

== Career ==
Born in Paços de Ferreira, Barros was a national level runner in the 1500 metres and the 5000 metres in her early twenties. The 2007 season, where she changed from track races towards road races saw her rise in prominence. In the half marathon she beat all opposition at the Setúbal Half Marathon, running a time of 1:13:54. She ran at the Porto Half Marathon, where she claimed third place, that September and was the runner-up at the Ovar Half Marathon behind Fernanda Ribeiro in October. A marathon debut followed two weeks later and she won on her first attempt, taking the top honours at the Porto Marathon. In 2008, she ran a half marathon in Pombal, finishing behind Inês Monteiro and then went on to represent Portugal in the marathon at the 2008 Beijing Olympics, finishing in 32nd place. Barros showed significant improvements at the Seville Marathon in February 2009 with a significant personal best of 2:26:03, winning the national title. She competed in a 10K road event at the 2009 Lusophony Games and was second behind Ribeiro. Later that season she went on to take sixth place at the 2009 World Championships Marathon as the first European finisher.

Her first race of 2010 was the Osaka Ladies Marathon and she improved her time to 2:25:45, finishing as runner-up to Amane Gobena. Barros underperformed in the event at the 2010 European Athletics Championships as she was ten minutes off her best time and had to settle for eighth place. She ran in the Great North Run in September 2010 and took third place with a time of 1:09:09, behind compatriot Ana Dulce Félix. The 2010 European Cross Country Championships were held on home turf in Albufeira and Barros ran for the hosts, taking sixth place overall and helping the Portuguese women to the team title, alongside race winner Jessica Augusto.

She ran at the 2011 Yokohama Women's Marathon and took third place, improving her personal best time to 2:25:04. She came ninth in the marathon at the 2011 World Championships in Athletics and also placed fifth at that year's Great North Run. The next year she took thirteenth place in the 2012 London Olympic marathon with a run of 2:26:13 and once again came third in Yokohama.

== International competition record ==
| Year | Competition | Venue | Position | Event | Notes |
Representing Portugal
| 2008 | Summer Olympics | Beijing, China | 32nd | Marathon | 2:34:08 |
| 2009 | Osaka Ladies Marathon | Osaka, Japan | 2nd | Marathon | 2:25:44 |
| 2009 | Lusophony Games | Lisbon, Portugal | 2nd | 10K | |
| 2009 | World Championships | Berlin, Germany | 6th | Marathon | 2:26:50 |
| 2010 | European Championships | Barcelona, Spain | 8th | Marathon | 2:35:43 |
| 2010 | European Cross Country Championships | Albufeira, Portugal | 6th | Senior race | (Team gold medal) |
| 2012 | Summer Olympics | London, England | 13th | Marathon | 2:26:13 |
