= Tetyana Filonyuk =

Ukrainian long-distance runner

Tetyana Filonyuk Tetiana Filoniuk
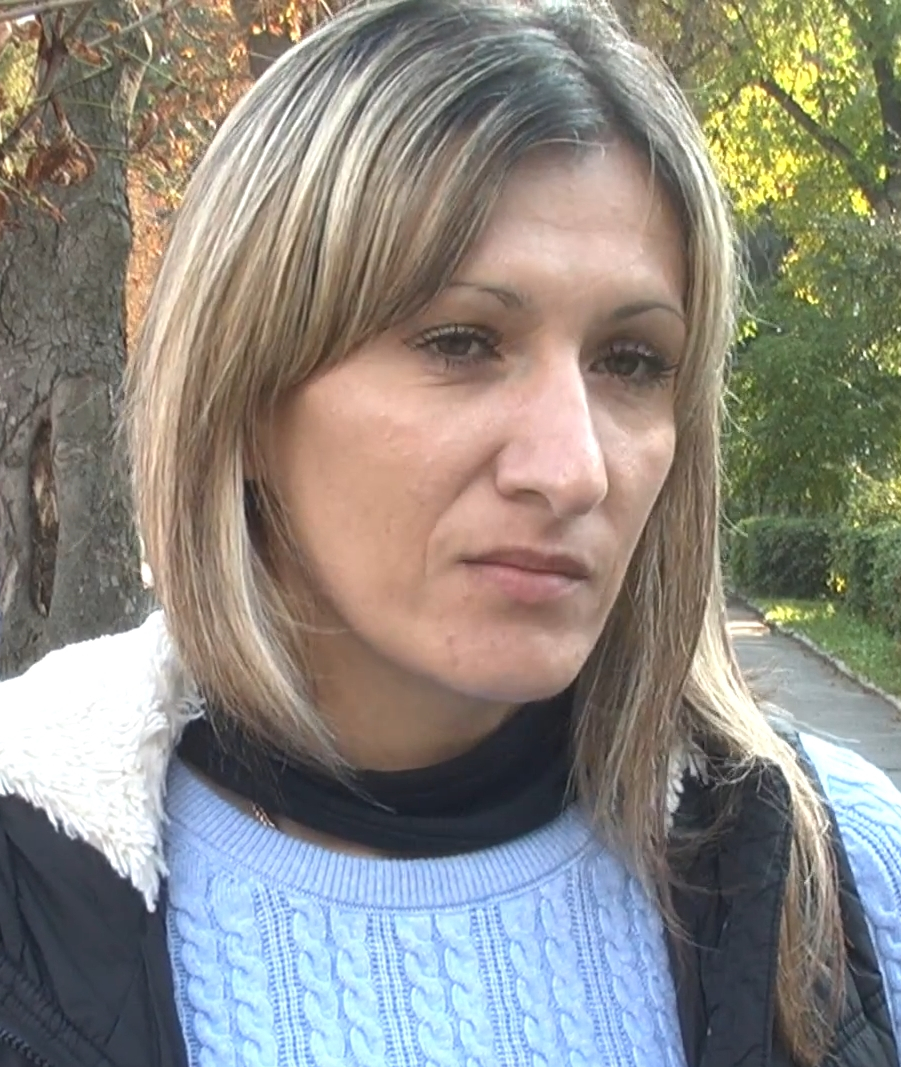
- Tetyana Filonyuk in October 2018

Personal information
- Born: April 5, 1984 (age 42)
- Height: 1.67 m (5 ft 5 1/2 in)
- Weight: 48 kg (106 lb)

Sport
- Country: Ukraine
- Sport: Athletics
- Event: Marathon
Medal record
Ljubljana Marathon
| Gold medal – first place | 2007 Ljubljana | Marathon |
European Championships
| Silver medal – second place | 2010 Barcelona | Marathon |

Tetyana Filonyuk or Tetiana Filoniuk (Ukrainian: Тетяна Філонюк; born April 5, 1984, in Novoselytsia) is a Ukrainian long-distance runner who specialises in marathon running.

== Achievements ==
| Year | Competition | Venue | Position | Event | Notes |
|---|---|---|---|---|---|
| 2007 | Ljubljana Marathon | Ljubljana, Slovenia | 1st | Marathon | 2:34:58 |
| 2008 | Summer Olympics | Beijing, China | 31st | Marathon | 2:33:35 |
| 2009 | Universiade | Belgrade, Serbia | 10th | 5000m | 16:12.75 |
| 2010 | European Championships | Barcelona, Spain | 2nd | Marathon | 2:33:57 |
