= Zuzana Tomaš =

Slovak long-distance runner

Personal information
- Nationality: Slovakia
- Born: Zuzana Šaríková; 15 February 1977 (age 49) Brezno, Czechoslovakia
- Height: 1.68 m (5 ft 6 in)
- Weight: 52 kg (115 lb)

Sport
- Sport: Athletics
- Event: Marathon
- Club: ŠK HI -TEC Banská Bystrica
- Coached by: Aleksandar Tomas

Achievements and titles
- Personal best: Marathon: 2:39:27 (2008)

Zuzana Tomaš (née Šaríková; born 15 February 1977), is a Slovak marathon runner. Tomaš competed at 2008 Summer Olympics, where she finished 67th in 2:49:39, about ten minutes behind her personal record (2:39:26). Tomaš's coach is Aleksandar Tomaš.

Born in Brezno, Tomaš received her PhD in linguistics from the University of Utah in Salt Lake City, Utah, United States. She became an assistant professor in the World Languages department at Eastern Michigan University in Ypsilanti, Michigan, United States, in June 2011.
