= Beatriz Santiago =

Spanish long-distance runner

Personal information
- Born: 28 October 1968 (age 57) Neuilly-sur-Seine, France

Sport
- Sport: Long-distance running

Beatriz Santiago Sánchez (born 28 October 1968) is a Spanish long-distance runner.

She finished sixth in the 3000 metres at the 2002 IAAF World Cup and eighteenth in the long race at the 2003 World Cross Country Championships.

== Personal bests ==
- 3000 metres - 8:59.22 min (2002)
- 5000 metres - 15:11.01 min (2001)
- 10,000 metres - 32:12.6 min (2000)
- Half marathon - 1:13:24 hrs (2003)
