= Lee Sun-young =

South Korean long-distance runner

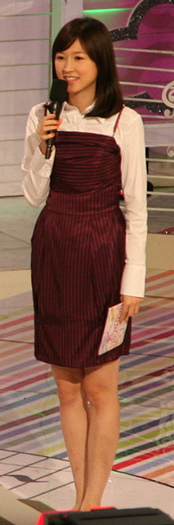
Lee Sun-Young

Lee Sun-young (born 20 April 1984) is a South Korean long-distance runner who specializes in the marathon.

She finished seventh in 10,000 metres at the 2005 Asian Championships and competed in the 2008 Olympic marathon.

She won her first national marathon in 2008, winning the JoongAng Seoul Marathon in 2:29:58. She improved further the following year as achieved a personal best time of 2:27:48 at the Seoul International Marathon in March 2009. She won the JoongAng Marathon for a second time later that year, running a tactical race and beating the next best competitor by over three minutes.

== Achievements ==
Year	Competition	Venue	Position	Event	Notes
Representing South Korea
2008	Olympic Games	Beijing, PR China	56th	Marathon	2:43:23
