= Irina Permitina =

Russian long-distance runner

Irina Permitina (Russian: Ирина Пермитина; born February 3, 1968) is a Russian long distance runner, who won the bronze medal in the marathon at the 2006 European Athletics Championships in Gothenburg. She is the women's course record holder for the Twin Cities Marathon in Minneapolis and St. Paul, Minnesota, along with fellow Russian Zinaida Semenova, who ran the same time (but three-tenths of a second slower) in 2001.

== Half-Marathon World Champion (Masters) ==
Permitina held the record for fastest half-marathon run by a woman over 40 years old. She claimed the title while kicking to finish just seconds behind a younger Olesya Syreva at the Russian Half-Marathon Championship in 2008 in Novosibirsk. (In 2013, Syreva would have all her results to 2011 removed due to doping.) Permitina's record time was 1:09:56. She held this record until American Deena Kastor broke it in 2008.

== Achievements ==
Year	Competition	Venue	Position	Event	Notes
Representing Russia
1998	Reims Marathon	Reims, France	1st	Marathon	2:33:29
2003	Dubai Marathon	Dubai, United Arab Emirates	1st	Marathon	2:36:26
2003	Grandma's Marathon	Duluth, Minnesota	5th	Marathon	2:35:53
2004	Twin Cities Marathon	Minneapolis, United States	1st	Marathon	2:26:51
2005	World Championships	Helsinki, Finland	34th	Marathon	2:38:16
2006	European Championships	Gothenburg, Sweden	3rd	Marathon	2:30:53
2008	Russian National Championship Half-Marathon	Novosibirsk, Russia	2nd	Half-Marathon	1:09:56
2011	Asics Stockholm Marathon	Stockholm, Sweden	3rd	Marathon	2:39:44

== See also ==
- List of European Athletics Championships medalists (women)
