= Valentina Delion =

Moldovan marathon runner

Personal information
- Nationality: Moldova
- Born: 30 October 1973 (age 52)
- Height: 1.69 m (5 ft 6 1/2 in)
- Weight: 60 kg (132 lb)

Sport
- Sport: Athletics
- Event: Marathon

Achievements and titles
- Personal best: Marathon: 2:36:50 (2005)

Valentina Delion (born October 30, 1973) is a Moldovan marathon runner. She set a personal best time of 2:36:50, by winning the 2005 Bonn Marathon in Germany.

At age thirty-four, Delion made her official debut for the 2008 Summer Olympics in Beijing, where she competed in the women's marathon. She did not finish the race, before reaching the 35 km lap of the course.
