= Deborah Toniolo =

Italian long-distance runner

Personal information
- Nationality: Italian
- Born: 24 April 1977 (age 49) Schio
- Height: 1.61 m (5 ft 3 1/2 in)
- Weight: 48 kg (106 lb)

Sport
- Country: Italy
- Sport: Athletics
- Event: Marathon
- Club: G.S. Forestale

Achievements and titles
- Personal best: Marathon: 2:28:31 (1991)
Medal record
European Marathon Cup
| Gold medal – first place | 2006 Helsinki | Team marathon |
| Silver medal – second place | 2010 Barcelona | Team marathon |
International Marathon
Event / 1st / 2nd / 3rd; Milan Marathon / 0 / 0 / 1

Deborah Toniolo (born 24 April 1977) is an Italian long-distance runner who specializes in the marathon. She won two medals, with national marathon team, at the International athletics competitions.

== Biography ==
She finished seventh at the 2006 European Athletics Championships in Gothenburg with a personal best time of 2:31:31 hours. She has 5 caps in national team from 2005 to 2007.

== See also ==
- 2006 European Marathon Cup
- 2010 European Marathon Cup
