= Karina Pérez (runner) =

Mexican long-distance runner

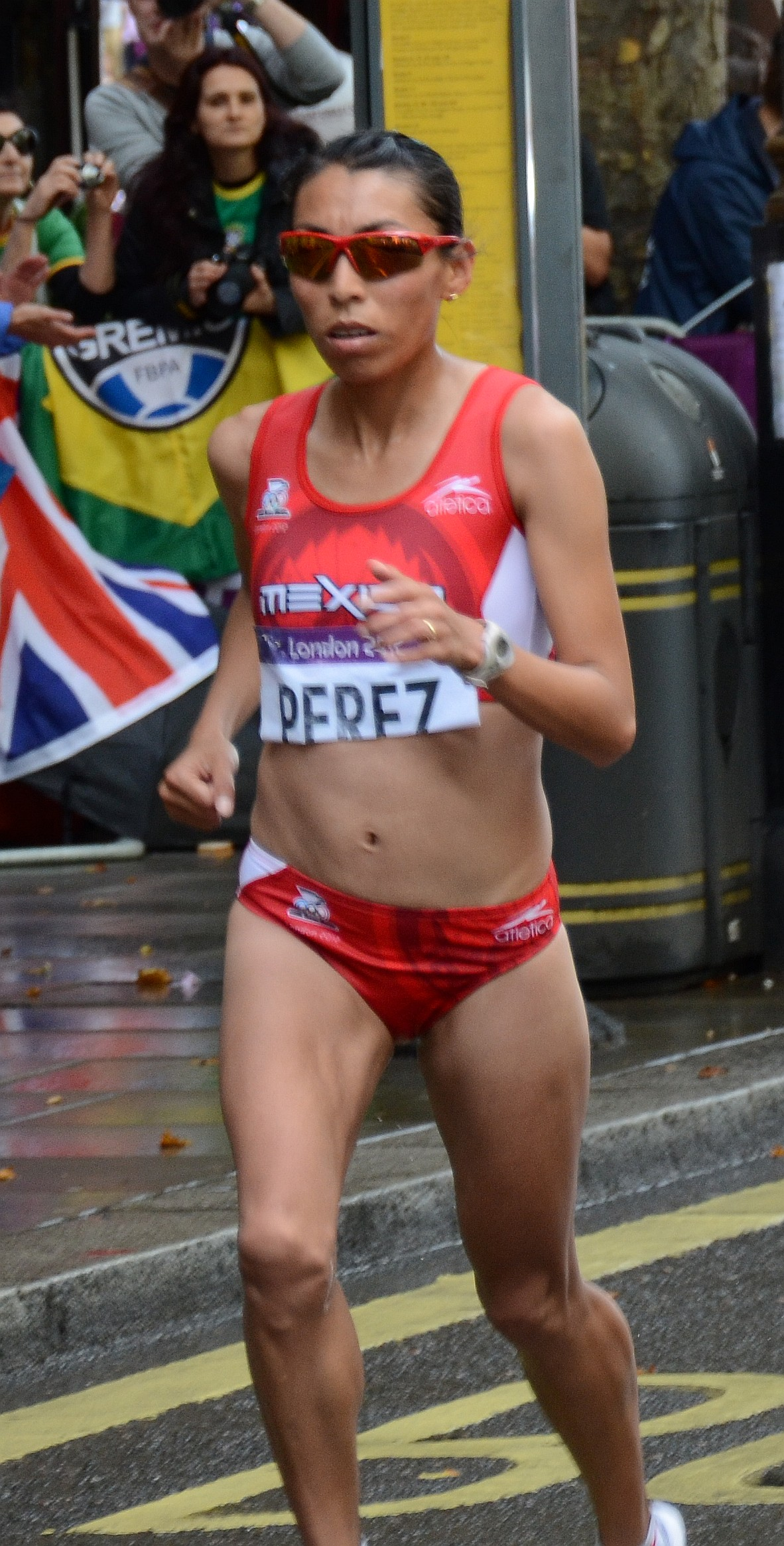
- Pérez in the 2012 Summer Olympics marathon

Personal information
- Full name: Karina Pérez Delgado
- Born: 4 October 1982 (age 43) Tlaxcala, Mexico
- Height: 1.58 m (5 ft 2 in)
- Weight: 44 kg (97 lb)

Sport
- Country: Mexico
- Sport: Athletics
- Event: Marathon
- Updated on 1 January 2015

Karina Pérez Delgado (born 4 October 1982) is a Mexican long-distance runner. At the 2008 Summer Olympics, she finished 61st in the women's marathon. She competed in the marathon at the 2012 Summer Olympics, placing 50th with a time of 2:33:30.

== Personal bests ==
Event	Result	Venue	Date
5000 m	16:26.94 min	Monterrey, Mexico	13 March 2010
10,000 m	33:30.84 min	Walnut, United States	15 April 2010
Half marathon	1:12:55 hrs	Udine, Italy	14 October 2007
Marathon	2:31:30 hrs	Torreón, Mexico	4 March 2012

== Achievements ==
Year	Competition	Venue	Position	Event	Notes
Representing Mexico
2001	World Cross Country Championships (U20)	Ostend, Belgium	92nd	5.9 km	25:36
2001	Pan American Junior Championships	Santa Fe, Argentina	2nd	3000m	10:13.45
2001	Pan American Junior Championships	Santa Fe, Argentina	6th	5000m	18:05.66
2004	NACAC Under-23 Championships	Sherbrooke, Canada	4th	5000m	17:59.97
2007	World Road Running Championships	Udine, Italy	35th	Half marathon	1:12:55
2008	Olympic Games	Beijing, China	61st	Marathon	2:47:02
2010	World Half Marathon Championships	Nanning, China	23rd	Half marathon	1:14:20
2012	Olympic Games	London, United Kingdom	50th	Marathon	2:33:30
2014	Central American and Caribbean Games	Xalapa, Mexico	4th	Marathon	2:44:19 A
