= Susanne Hahn =

German long-distance runner

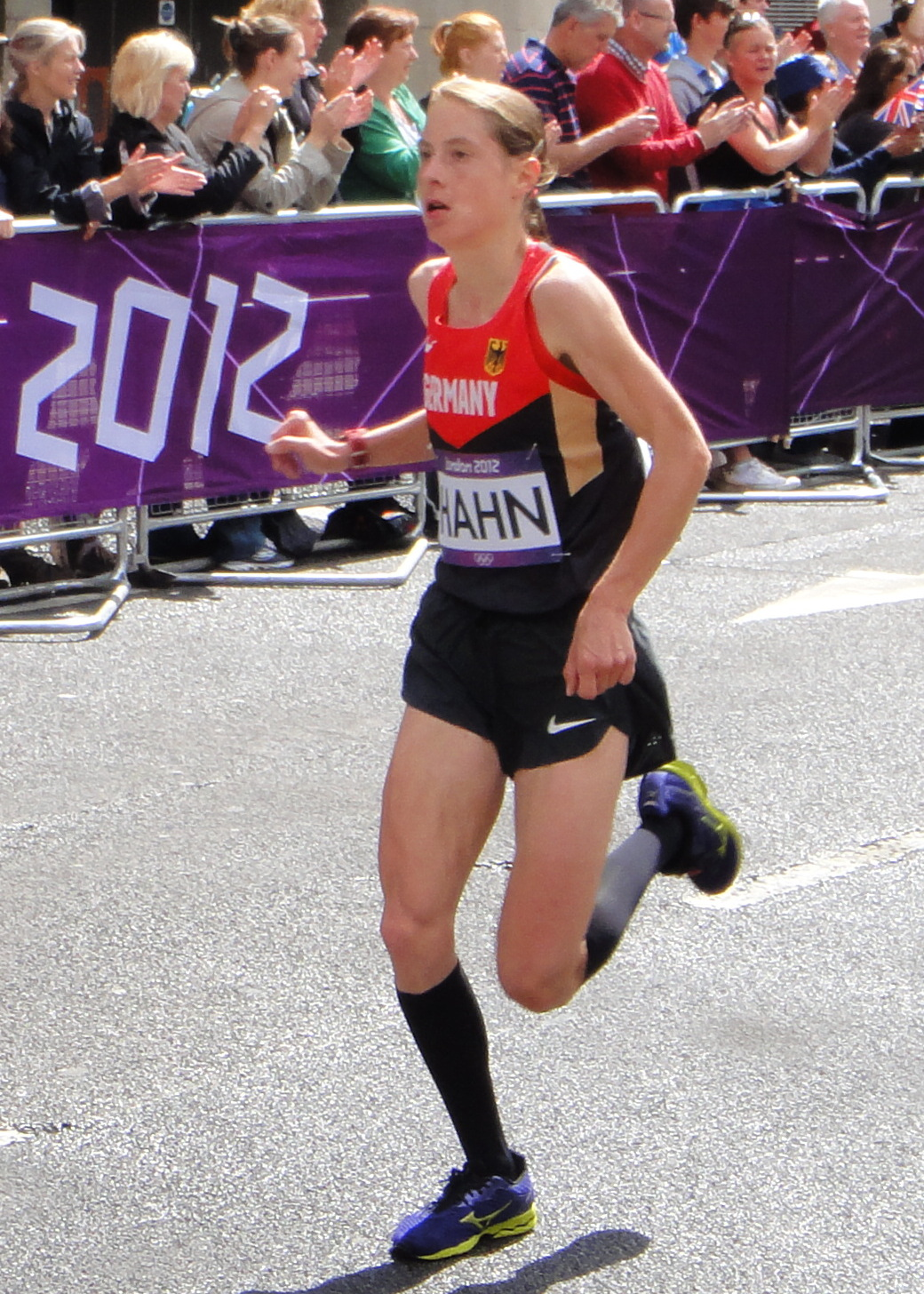
- Susanne Hahn at the Women's marathon during the 2012 Summer Olympics

Personal information
- Nationality: German
- Born: April 23, 1978 (age 48) Hildesheim, West Germany
- Height: 1.69 m (5 ft 6 1/2 in)
- Weight: 50 kg (110 lb)

Sport
- Country: Germany
- Sport: Track and field
- Event: Marathon
- Club: SV Saar 05 Saarbrücken
- Coached by: Frank Hahn

Achievements and titles
- Personal best: Marathon: 2:28:49h

Susanne Hahn (née Ritter, born 23 April 1978 in Hildesheim) is a German track and field athlete competing in the Marathon and other long-distance running events.

== Biography ==
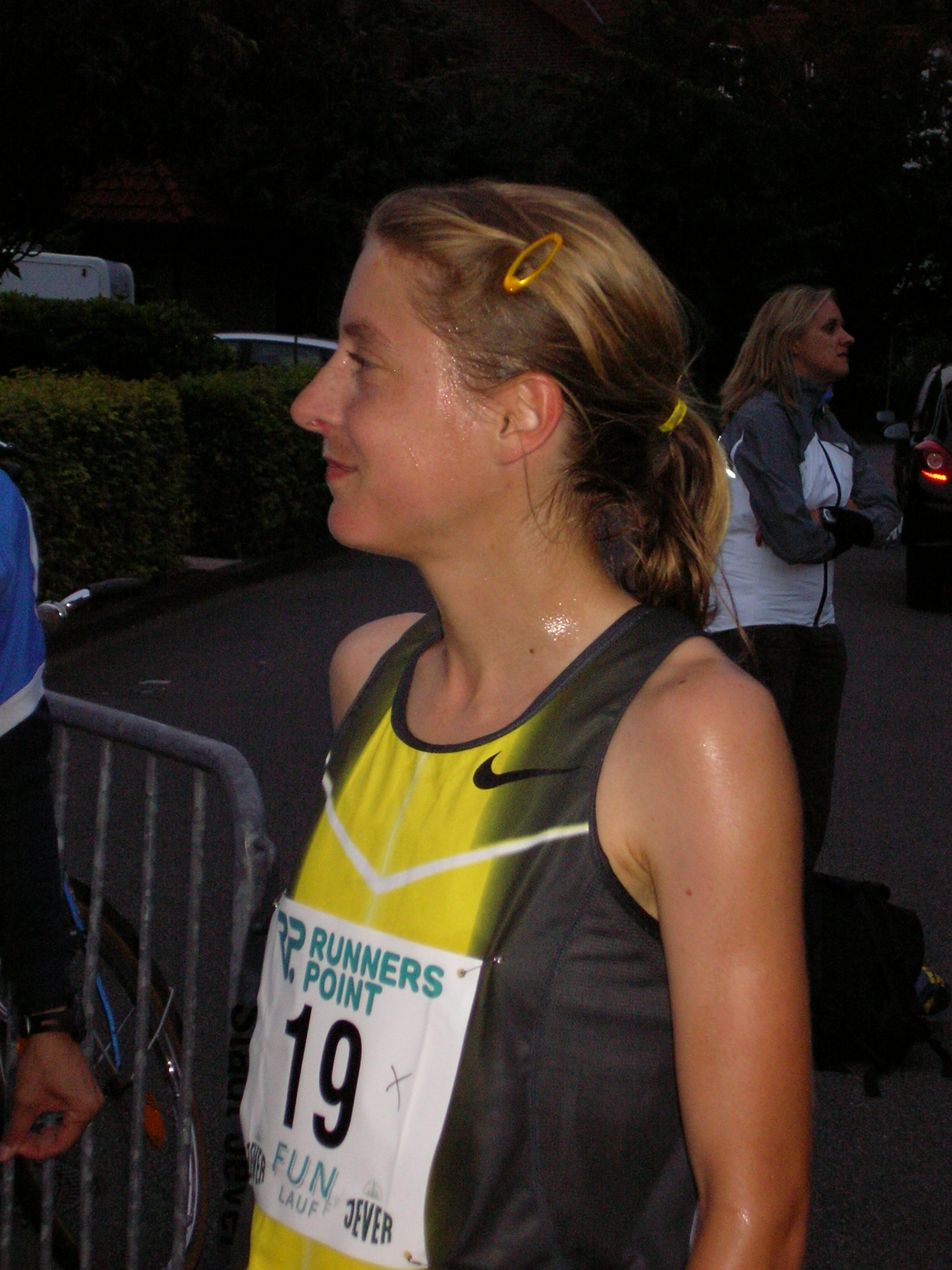
Susanne Hahn in Schortens, 2007

She competed in the 2008 Summer Olympics in Beijing, finishing the marathon in 52nd place. She also participated in the 2009 and 2007 World Championships in Athletics. In 2012, she was nominated to participate in the Olympic Games in London, where she finished in 32nd place.

Hahn is married to her coach, Frank Hahn.

Since May 2012, the German long-distance runner has been the official ambassador of the SOS Children's Villages and participated in several running events for the aid organization.
