= Marcella Mancini =

Italian long-distance runner (born 1971)

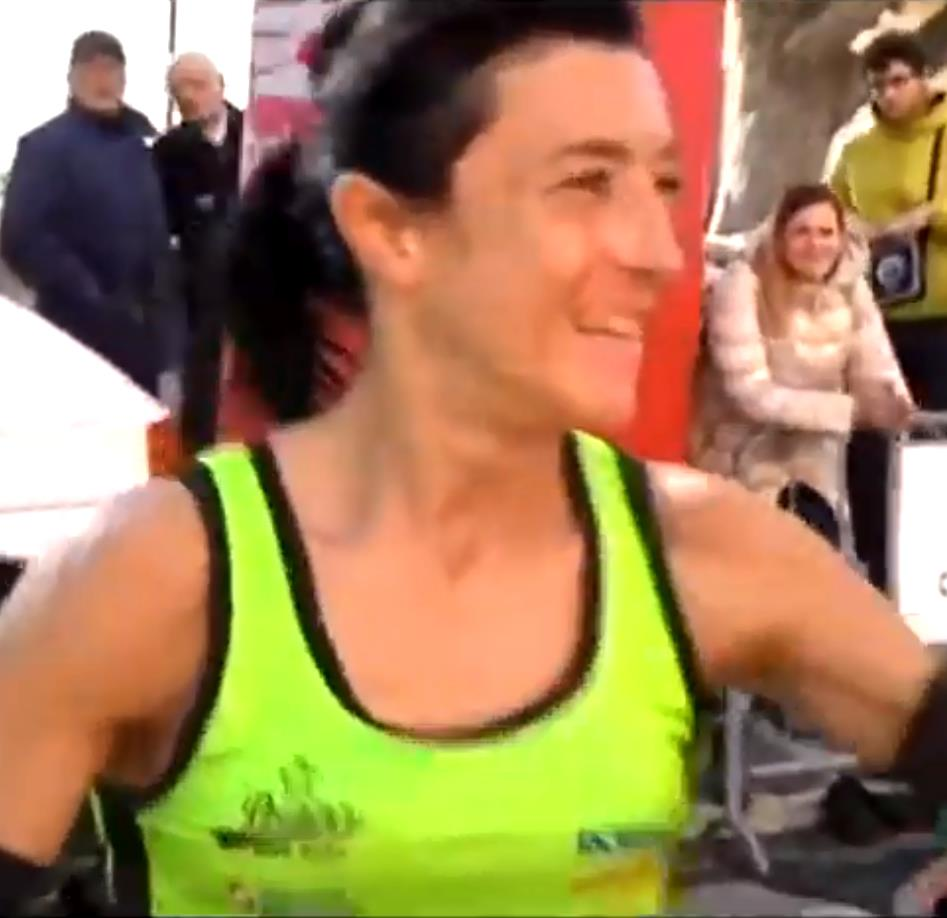
- Mancini at 2017 San Martino race.

Personal information
- National team: Italy: 2 caps (2005-2006)
- Born: 5 September 1971 (age 54) Ascoli Piceno, Italy

Sport
- Country: Italy
- Sport: Athletics
- Event: Marathon

Achievements and titles
- Personal best: Marathon: 2:33.17 (2005)
Medal record
European Marathon Cup
Gold medal – first place	2006 Göteborg	Team event

Marcella Mancini (born 5 September 1971) is an Italian long-distance runner who specialises in the marathon. A two-time Italian champion in the marathon, she has twice represented Italy at the international level – at the 2005 IAAF World Half Marathon Championships and the 2006 European Championships Marathon. Her personal best of 2:33:17 hours for the distance was set at the 2005 Turin Marathon.

She is a three-time winner of the Maratona di Sant'Antonio in Padua and won the 2011 Milan City Marathon. She has also won lower-level races in Reggio Emilia, Ravenna and her home town of Ascoli Piceno.

== Biography ==
Born in Ascoli Piceno, she made her debut over the distance on home turf at the Maratona del Piceno in 2000, coming fourth. The following year, she was sixth at the larger Rome City Marathon and returned to the Piceno race to take her first marathon win. She also took the first of three consecutive victories at the 2001 Maratonina di Porto Recanati half marathon. Mancini completed her first marathon under the two hours and forty minutes mark at the 2002 Rome Marathon, setting a personal best of 2:39:50 for fourth position. She won the 18 km Miglianico Tour competition in August, going on to place sixth at the Venice Marathon in October. Her second career win over the longer distance came at the end of that year, as she topped the rankings at the Reggio Emilia Marathon.

Mancini opened her 2003 season with two half-marathon wins in March, taking the title at the Maratonina delle 4 Porte in Pieve di Cento and then the Bologna Half Marathon. She went on to have a successful year in marathon running: she won the Maratona di Sant'Antonio in Padua in a personal best of 2:36:14 hours, took a second win of the year at the Ravenna Marathon, and then came fourth at the higher profile Italian Marathon in Carpi. The 2004 Roma-Ostia Half Marathon saw her set a personal best of 1:13:57 hours at the distance, taking fifth place. She knocked two minutes off her best at the Rome Marathon, coming fourth in 2:34:02 hours, A back-to-back victory at the Ravenna Marathon was followed by a runner-up performance at the Florence Marathon – her time of 2:34:40 was the second best of her career, although she was far behind Kenyan Florence Barsosio, who won the race.

She achieved a career best for the half-marathon at the Rome-Ostia race in February 2005, running 1:13:15 and finishing as runner-up to Rosaria Console. Another best came at the Turin Marathon in April, where her time of 2:33:16 brought her fourth place. Her performances gained Mancini her first national selection – at the 2005 IAAF World Half Marathon Championships she ended the competition in 51st place. She ended that year with a fourth-place finish at the Venice Marathon.

Mancini took her first Italian title as part of her win at the 2006 Maratona di Sant'Antonio. She was fourth at the Roma-Ostia Half Marathon and sixth at the Stramilano race. Her national title in Padua had earned her the opportunity to represent Italy in the marathon at the 2006 European Athletics Championships. Despite her ranking as the national champion, she was the fifth Italian to cross the line, ending the race in 21st place. Her sole marathon outing of 2007 came at the Milan City Marathon, where she was a distant second to Pamela Chepchumba.

In 2008, she was fourth at the Roma-Ostia and then made her first appearance at the Paris Marathon, coming twelfth overall. Her best time that year came via her winning run at the Padua Marathon, and she also placed in the top three at the Florence Marathon. Mancini completed her first marathon under 2:34:00 since 2005 at the Rome Marathon in 2009, but this was only enough for tenth place. She had a better placing at the Carpi Marathon in October, finishing as runner-up behind Anne Cheptanui Bererwe. The highlight of her 2010 was a national title win at the Venice Marathon (sixth overall) and top five finishes at the Milan and Florence Marathons.

Mancini was sixth at the Stramilano in March, but she went on to take a major win at the Milan Marathon the following month. The heat and wind contributed to the race's slowest ever winning time and she commented: "It was not a good day despite the win...but in the final kilometres I heard the crowd supporting me and this gave me extra strength to take the win." She returned to the Stramilano in 2012 and came third overall.

She is associated with the Volpiano-based Runner Team '99 SBV.

== Achievements ==
Year	Competition	Venue	Position	Notes
2005	World Half Marathon Championships	Edmonton, Canada	51st	Half marathon
2006	European Championships	Gothenburg, Sweden	21st	Marathon

== National titles ==
Mancini won two national championships at the individual senior level.

- Italian Athletics Championships
  - Marathon: 2006, 2010 (2)
