= Vincenza Sicari =

Italian long-distance runner (born 1979)

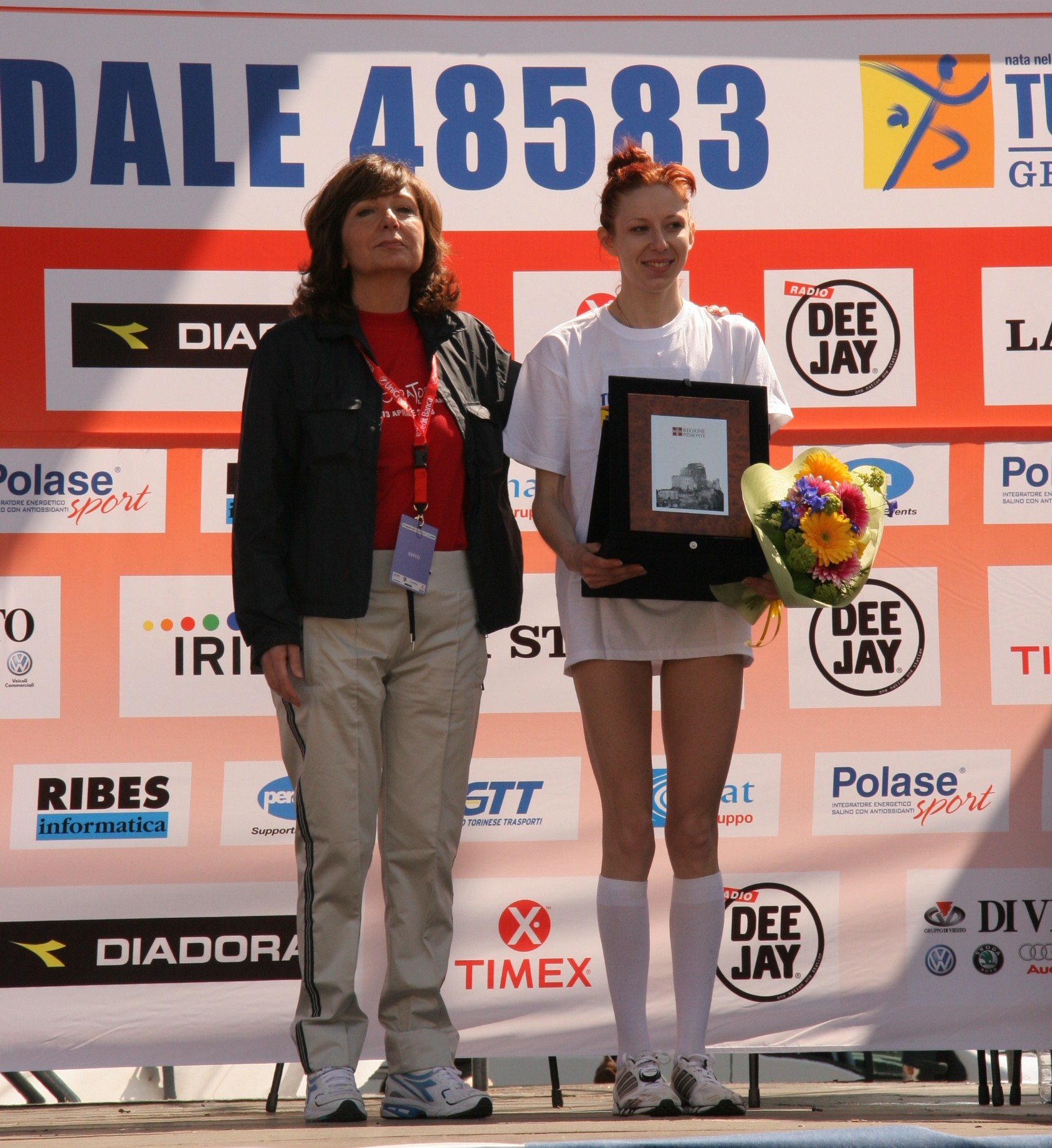
- Sicari (right) on the 2008 Turin Marathon podium

Personal information
- Nationality: Italian
- Born: 19 March 1979 (age 47) Lodi, Italy

Sport
- Country: Italy
- Sport: Athletics
- Event: Marathon

Achievements and titles
- Personal best: Half marathon: 1:10.21 (2008)

Vincenza Sicari (born 19 March 1979 in Lodi) is an Italian long-distance runner. She represented Italy internationally in cross country running early in her career, but later moved on to road events. She has appeared at the IAAF World Half Marathon Championships on three occasions and ran in the marathon for Italy at the 2008 Beijing Olympics.

She has competed extensively on the Italian road circuit and has won marathons in Carpi, Padua, and Turin. Her personal best of 2:29:51 hours, set in 2008, came at the latter race.

== Biography ==
She started her international career as a cross country runner: she ran as a junior at the 1998 IAAF World Cross Country Championships, made her senior debut at the European Cross Country Championships in 2001, and ran in the short race at the 2003 World Cross Championships. She began competing for the Italian Army team in 2004 and this coincided with her first national title, becoming champion over 10,000 metres. She recorded a half marathon best of 1:13:42 hours at the Napoli Half Marathon and represented Italy in that event at the 2004 IAAF World Half Marathon Championships, coming 34th. She was 45th at the European Cross Country Championships that December.

Sicari had her best placing at the World Cross Country Championships in 2005, placing 40th in the long race. She was runner-up at the Stramilano half marathon in April, setting a personal best of 1:12:39 minutes behind Anikó Kálovics. She was selected to compete on the track at the 2005 Mediterranean Games and she was sixth over 10,000 m. She also represented Italy at the World Half Marathon and the European Cross Country Championships that year.

Her debut marathon run came in October 2006 at the Italian Marathon in Carpi. She used the event to test her fitness over the distance and she came third. A run at the Florence Marathon followed and she fought off a challenge from Gloria Marconi to take a clear victory in 2:34:52 hours, although she slowed in the latter stages due to liver problems.

In January 2007 she won the 6 km race at the Montefortiana Turà in Monteforte d'Alpone. She knocked more than four minutes off her best at the 2007 Maratona di Sant'Antonio in Padua and won the women's race. She eased to victory at the Scalata al Castello 5 km and stated that she was keen to form part of the national marathon team for the 2007 World Championships in Athletics. However, she missed out on the squad and instead had to make do with an appearance at the 2007 IAAF World Road Running Championships in Udine (where she was 24th). The Florence Marathon offered her a chance gain a place for the 2008 Italian Olympic team and she won the race for a second year running.

Sicari began 2008 with a win at the Maratonina dei Tre Comuni, followed by a second-place finish at the Rome-Ostia Half Marathon in a personal best of 1:10:21 hours. An attempt to gain an Olympic place at the Rome City Marathon failed after she dropped out of the race. She rebounded with a win at the La Lagarina half marathon later that month and just dipped under FIDAL's time standard of two hours thirty minutes at the Turin Marathon, gaining selection and the women's title in a personal best of 2:29:51 hours. She won the women's race at the Trofeo San Vittore in June. On her debut Olympic appearance at the 2008 Beijing Olympics Marathon she came 29th with a time of 2:33:31 hours. She brought her year to a close with a third-place finish at the Turin Half Marathon and a win at the Straconi Golden Run in Cuneo.

She competed in a number of half marathons in 2009, winning the Valli e Pinete Half Marathon and the Maratonina di Cremona, as well as having a top five finish at the Stramilano. She won a second title at the Maratonina dei Tre Comuni at the start of 2010, but did not run competitively for the rest of the year.

== Achievements ==
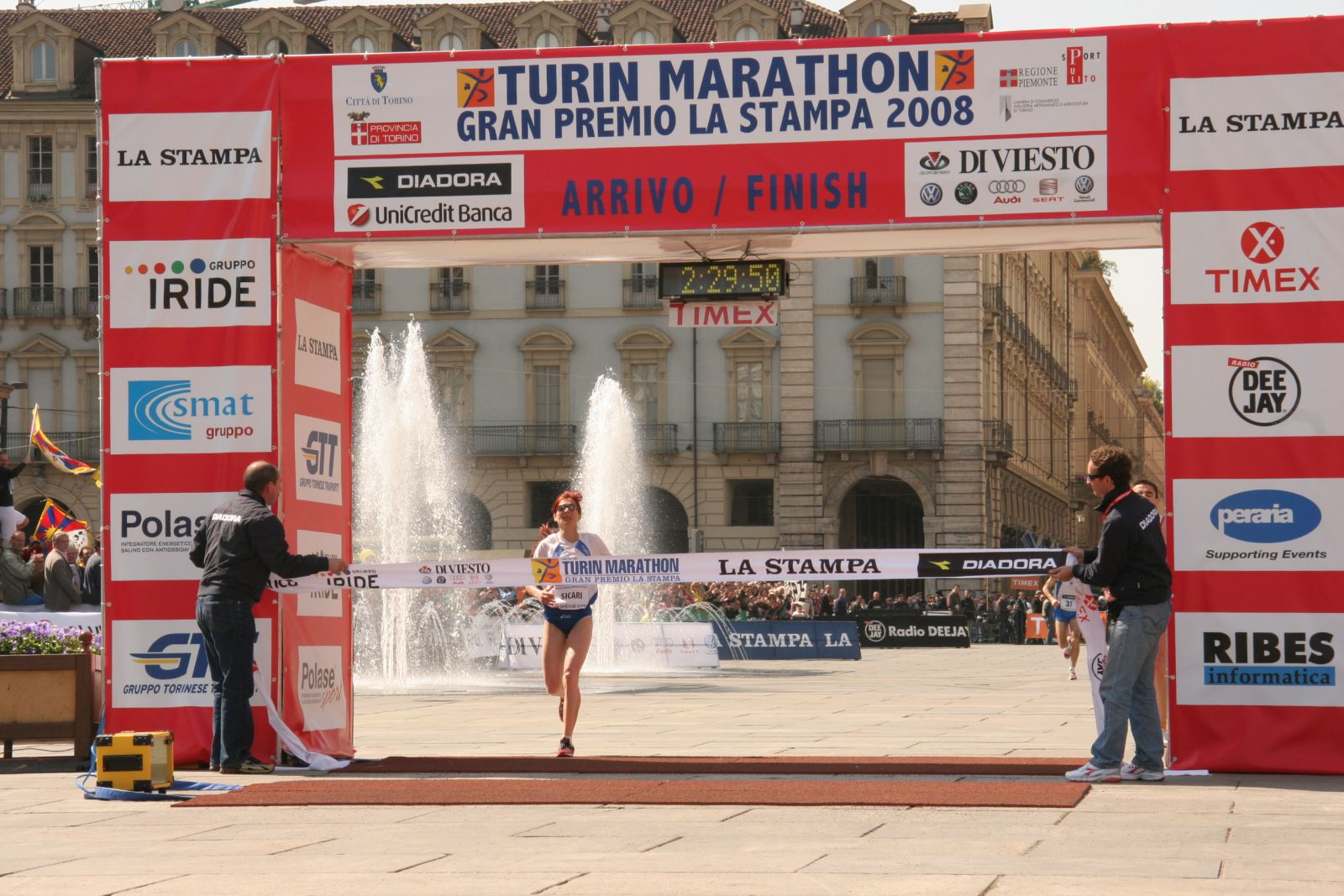
Sicari crossing the line to win the 2008 Turin Marathon

Year	Competition	Venue	Position	Notes
1998	World Cross Country Championships	Marrakesh, Morocco	70th	Junior race
2001	European Cross Country Championships	Thun, Switzerland	55th	Long race
2003	World Cross Country Championships	Lausanne, Switzerland	51st	Short race
2004	World Half Marathon Championships	New Delhi, India	34th	Half marathon
2005	World Cross Country Championships	Saint-Étienne–Saint-Galmier, France	40th	Long race
2005	Mediterranean Games	Almería, Spain	6th	10,000 m
2005	World Half Marathon Championships	Edmonton, Canada	31st	Half marathon
2007	World Road Running Championships	Udine, Italy	24th	Half marathon
2008	Olympic Games	Beijing, China	29th	Marathon

== See also ==
- Italian all-time lists - Half marathon
