= Maratona di Sant'Antonio =

Annual road running competition in Italy

- Prato della Valle, Padua's central square, is the race end point.
- Date: April
- Location: Padua, Italy
- Event type: Road
- Distance: Marathon, Half marathon
- Primary sponsor: Alì
- Established: 2000
- Course records: Men's: 2:08:22 (2024) (Kenya) Timothy Kipchumba; Women's: 2:29:18 (2018) (Ethiopia) Waganesh Mekasha
- Website: Padova Marathon
- Participants: 1,044 finishers (2022); 1,147 finishers (2021); 1,244 (2019)

The Maratona di Sant'Antonio (also known as the Maratona S. Antonio and Padua Marathon) is an annual road running competition which takes place in April in Padua, Italy. The event features a full marathon race (42.195 km), a half marathon, and a range of shorter fun run events for amateurs. The competition is named in honour of Anthony of Padua, a 13th-century saint who died in the city.

== History ==
The first marathon held in the area was the Vedelago Marathon, which was a national level race organised by the Gruppo Atletica Vedelago between 1988 and 1999. Another group, Assindustria Sport Padova, took over management of the marathon in 2000 and the race became an international one. Its route was also changed, with the start point remaining in the comune of Vedelago and the finish point being moved to Padua. A new course was introduced for the 2011 edition, which began in Campodarsego and found its end point in Padua's large city square – the Prato della Valle.

The marathon race has incorporated the Italian Championship in the event, hosting the national title event in 2005 and 2006. The event has also included a hand bike race for disabled athletes and former race-car driver Alex Zanardi won the 2011 competition. A total of 3384 runners finished the half marathon and marathon at that year's event, which was broadcast on television domestically via Rai Sport 2.

The success of African runners at the marathon drew the ire of Pietro Giovannoni, a local politician and Lega Nord member, who said public funds should not be used to support a race won by foreigners. The city's deputy mayor Ivo Rossi condemned the comments, saying they were idiotic and damaging to the region's image.

== Past winners ==
=== Vedelago Marathon era ===
Key: Course record

Edition	Year	Men's winner	Time (h:m:s)	Women's winner	Time (h:m:s)
1st	1988	Paolo Ravaglia (ITA)	2:36:46	Luigia Casagrande (ITA)	3:18:14
2nd	1989	Paolo Ravaglia (ITA)	2:35:39	Laura Zanini (ITA)	3:21:41
3rd	1990	Maurizio Zanfavero (ITA)	2:31:41	Luigia Casagrande (ITA)	3:30:38
4th	1991	Oddone Tubia (ITA)	2:26:43	Laura Zanini (ITA)	3:17:17
5th	1992	Luigi Albertini (ITA)	2:31:17	Maria Rita Zanaboni (ITA)	3:15:20
6th	1993	Oddone Tubia (ITA)	2:32:39	Loretta Mocellin (ITA)	3:26:58
7th	1994	Silvano Gambarotto (ITA)	2:23:55	Monica Casiraghi (ITA)	3:14:22
8th	1995	Diego Paioni (ITA)	2:25:14	Maria Forza (ITA)	3:02:17
9th	1996	Silvano Gambarotto (ITA)	2:21:27	Danila Moras (ITA)	3:03:03
10th	1997	Massimiliano Bogdanich (ITA)	2:22:50	Anna Boniolo (ITA)	2:53:52
11th	1998	Silvano Gambarotto (ITA)	2:24:10	Anna Boniolo (ITA)	2:59:03
12th	1999	Giorgio Calcaterra (ITA)	2:19:26	Anna Boniolo (ITA)	3:00:45

=== Maratona di Sant'Antonio era ===
==== Marathon ====
Key: Course record Country's championship race

Edition	Year	Men's winner	Time (h:m:s)	Women's winner	Time (h:m:s)
1st	2000	Migidio Bourifa (ITA)	2:13:55	Franca Fiacconi (ITA)	2:30:20
2nd	2001	Gideon Chirchir (KEN)	2:11:51.8	Rosaria Console (ITA)	2:30:54.4
3rd	2002	Douglas Rono (KEN)	2:11:01	Giovanna Volpato (ITA)	2:37:23
4th	2003	Dawit Terefa (ETH)	2:10:37.7	Marcella Mancini (ITA)	2:36:14.0
5th	2004	Benjamin Korir (KEN)	2:10:43.5	Tiziana Alagia (ITA)	2:32:02.6
6th	2005	Paul Lokira (KEN)	2:11:24.3	Ivana Iozzia (ITA)	2:35:54.4
7th	2006	Ruggero Pertile (ITA)	2:11:17.8	Marcella Mancini (ITA)	2:34:51.8
8th	2007	Paul Kogo (KEN)	2:10:38.8	Vincenza Sicari (ITA)	2:30:34.7
9th	2008	Francis Kirwa (KEN)	2:11:00.6	Marcella Mancini (ITA)	2:35:24.1
10th	2009	Ben Kipruto (KEN)	2:09:42	Woynishet Girma (ETH)	2:31:03
11th	2010	Gilbert Chepkwony (KEN)	2:10:46	Rael Kinyara (KEN)	2:30:19
12th	2011	Tadese Tolesa (ETH)	2:09:02	Florence Chepsoi (KEN)	2:29:25
13th	2012	Robert Kwambai (KEN)	2:09:14	Marily dos Santos (BRA)	2:31:55
14th	2013	Paulo Roberto Paula (BRA)	2:13:00	Hanane Janat (MAR)	2:36:18
15th	2014	Pharis Kimani (KEN)	2:12:03	Fatna Maraoui (ITA)	2:36:32
16th	2015	Robert Kipkemboi (KEN)	2:09:32	Nancy Githaiga (KEN)	2:41:28
17th	2016	Ruggero Pertile (ITA)	2:12:16	Federica Dal Ri (ITA)	2:37:04
18th	2017	Michael Kunyuga (KEN)	2:10:43	Fatna Maraoui (ITA)	2:32:52
19th	2018	Mogos Shumay (ERI)	2:12:23	Waganesh Mekasha (ETH)	2:29:18
20th	2019	Samuel Lomoi (KEN)	2:12:20	Ayantu Abera (ETH)	2:29:30
22nd	2022	Alfonce Kibiwott (KEN)	2:10:01	Rebecca Cheptegei (UGA)	2:31:21
23rd	2023	Gilbert Chumba (KEN)	2:13:49	Tigist Bikila (ETH)	2:30:45
24th	2024	Timothy Kipchumba (KEN)	2:08:22	Lenah Jerotich (KEN)	2:31:47

==== Half marathon ====
Edition	Year	Men's winner	Time (h:m:s)	Women's winner	Time (h:m:s)
21st	2021	Victor Kipchirchir (KEN)	59:19	Rahma Tusa (ETH)	1:09:06

== Statistics ==
Multiple winners

- Marcella Mancini (2003, 2006 and 2008 winner) is the only athlete to have won the race on multiple occasions

Winners by country

Country	Men's race	Women's race	Total
Kenya	13	3	16
Italy	3	12	15
Ethiopia	2	2	4
Brazil	1	1	2
Eritrea	1	0	1
Morocco	0	1	1
Uganda	0	1	1

- Note: Statistics are for Maratona di Sant'Antonio era only
