= Chebet =

Chebet, also transliterated as Jebet and Chepet, is a surname of Kenyan origin. Notable people with the surname include:

- Beatrice Chebet (born 2000), Kenyan distance runner and Olympic gold medalist
- Ben Chebet Kipruto (born 1982), Kenyan marathon runner based in Italy
- Emily Chebet (born 1986), Kenyan runner and world cross country champion
- Irene Chepet Cheptai (born 1992), Kenyan runner and world cross country medallist
- Joseph Chebet (born 1970), Kenyan runner and winner of the 1999 Boston and New York Marathons
- Lilian Chebet Siyoi, Kenyan politician
- Peter Chebet (born 1974), Kenyan marathon runner
- Ruth Chebet (born 1996), Kenyan-born long-distance runner for Bahrain
- Wilson Chebet (born 1985), Kenyan professional road runner

== See also ==
- Florence Jebet Kiplagat (born 1987), Kenyan runner and 2009 world cross country champion
- Lydia Jebet Rotich (born 1988), Kenyan steeplechase athlete
- Nancy Jebet Langat (born 1981), Kenyan middle-distance runner and 2008 Olympic champion
- Salina Jebet Kosgei (born 1976), Kenyan runner and winner of the 2009 Boston Marathon
