= Kimetto =

Kimetto is a surname of Kenyan origin. Notable people with the surname include:

- Alice Kimetto Chelangat (born 1976), Kenyan marathon runner
- Dennis Kipruto Kimetto (born 1984), Kenyan marathon runner
