= Irina Bogacheva (athlete) =

Kyrgyzstani long-distance runner

Personal information
- Born: 30 May 1961 (age 65) Frunze, Kirghiz SSR, Soviet Union
- Height: 168 cm (5 ft 6 in)
- Weight: 54 kg (119 lb)

Sport
- Country: Kyrgyzstan
- Sport: Track and Field
- Events: Marathon long distance, 5000, 10000
- Club: National Team Kyrgyzstan

Achievements and titles
- Personal best: Marathon – 2:26:27 (2000)
Medal record
Representing Soviet Union
Summer Universiade
Gold medal – first place	1989 Duisburg	Marathon

Irina Bogacheva (Russian: Ирина Богачева; born 30 May 1961) is a retired Kyrgyzstani long-distance runner. She competed in the marathon at the 1996, 2000 and 2004 Summer Olympics with the best result of 14th place in 2000.

Bogacheva consistently ran fast marathons and she has the most sub 2:35 (35), sub 2:40 (59) and sub 2:50 (70) marathon times by a female runner.

== International competitions ==
Year	Competition	Venue	Position	Event	Notes
Representing Soviet Union
1986	Goodwill Games	Moscow, Soviet Union	2nd	Marathon	2:34:09
1986	European Championships	Stuttgart, West Germany	17th	Marathon	2:43:30
1989	Summer Universiade	Duisburg, West Germany	1st	Marathon	2:35:09
1990	Goodwill Games	Seattle, United States	2nd	Marathon	2:36:25
Representing Kyrgyzstan
1996	Olympic Games	Atlanta, United States	21st	Marathon	2:35:44
2000	Olympic Games	Sydney, Australia	14th	Marathon	2:29:55
2004	Olympic Games	Athens, Greece	—	Marathon	DNF

== Marathons ==
Year	Competition	Venue	Position	Notes
1987	Athens Classic Marathon	Athens, Greece	1st	2:43:37
1991	Italian Marathon	Carpi, Emilia-Romagna	1st	2:28:57
1992	San Francisco Marathon	San Francisco	1st	2:36:54
1995	Grandma's Marathon	Duluth, United States	1st	2:34:11
1997	Belgrade Marathon	Belgrade	1st	2:34:57
1997	Grandma's Marathon	Duluth, United States	1st	2:38:44
1997	Honolulu Marathon	Honolulu	2nd	2:34:01
1998	Belgrade Marathon	Belgrade	1st	2:32:07
1998	Honolulu Marathon	Honolulu	1st	2:33:27
1999	Honolulu Marathon	Honolulu	1st	2:32:36
1999	Los Angeles Marathon	Los Angeles, United States	1st	2:30:32
1999	Rock 'n' Roll San Diego Marathon	San Diego	1st	2:28:46
1999	Chicago Marathon	Chicago	5th	2:27:46
2000	Boston Marathon	Boston	2nd	2:26:27 NR
2000	Honolulu Marathon	Honolulu	6th	2:35:54
2001	London Marathon	London, United Kingdom	14th	2:32:28
2001	Milan Marathon	Milan	5th	2:35:27
2001	Hong Kong Marathon	Hong Kong, PR China	1st	2:33:43
2002	Twin Cities Marathon	Minneapolis-St. Paul	1st	2:29:39
2002	Honolulu Marathon	Honolulu	5th	2:33:35
2003	Nagoya Marathon	Nagoya	3rd	2:28:17
2003	Rock 'n' Roll San Diego Marathon	San Diego	1st	2:29:52
2004	Nagoya Marathon	Nagoya	14th	2:35:56
2004	Salt Lake City Marathon	Salt Lake City	2nd	2:33:02
2004	Rock 'n' Roll San Diego Marathon	San Diego	9th	2:57:41
2005	Nagoya Marathon	Nagoya	20th	2:37:04
2005	Knoxville Marathon	Knoxville	1st	2:41:43
2005	Salt Lake City Marathon	Salt Lake City	3rd	2:37:48
