= Sammy Korir =

Kenyan long-distance runner

Sammy Korir (born December 12, 1971) is a long distance runner from Kenya.

== Biography ==
Korir was born in Kiboswa village, Nandi County of Rift Valley Province, Kenya. In 2003 he finished second in Berlin Marathon with a time of 2:04:56, just one second after the winner of the race, Paul Tergat who broke the previous world record. In 2008 he became the first man to run ten marathons faster than the time of 2:09 hours, by finishing third in Dubai Marathon with a time of 2:08:01. The race was won by Haile Gebrselassie, who narrowly failed to break the world record held by himself.

Overall, Korir has run 20 marathons under 2:12:00 in his career.

== Marathon achievements ==
Year	Competition	Venue	Position	Notes
December 1, 1996	Florence Marathon	Florence, Italy	1st	2:15:04
December 15, 1996	Cancún Marathon	Cancún, Mexico	1st	2:12:33
April 20, 1997	Rotterdam Marathon	Rotterdam, Netherlands	3rd	2:08:02
November 2, 1997	Amsterdam Marathon	Amsterdam, Netherlands	1st	2:08:24
November 1, 1998	Amsterdam Marathon	Amsterdam, Netherlands	1st	2:08:13
May 2, 1999	Turin Marathon	Turin, Italy	1st	2:08:27
October 24, 1999	Chicago Marathon	Chicago, United States	13th	2:13:08
April 22, 2001	Rotterdam Marathon	Rotterdam, Netherlands	3rd	2:08:14
February 3, 2002	Beppu-Ōita Marathon	Beppu/Ōita, Japan	1st	2:11:45
June 2, 2002	Rock 'n' Roll San Diego Marathon	San Diego, United States	1st	2:09:01
October 20, 2002	Amsterdam Marathon	Amsterdam, Netherlands	5th	2:08:10
March 30, 2003	Xiamen International Marathon	Xiamen, China	2nd	2:10:44
June 1, 2003	Rock 'n' Roll San Diego Marathon	San Diego, United States	4th	2:11:36
September 28, 2003	Berlin Marathon	Berlin, Germany	2nd	2:04:56
April 18, 2004	London Marathon	London, United Kingdom	2nd	2:06:48
December 5, 2004	Fukuoka Marathon	Fukuoka, Japan	3rd	2:11:45
October 9, 2005	Chicago Marathon	Chicago, United States	9th	2:10:53
February 12, 2006	Tokyo Marathon	Tokyo, Japan	3rd	2:10:07
April 9, 2006	Rotterdam Marathon	Rotterdam, Netherlands	1st	2:06:38
January 18, 2008	Dubai Marathon	Dubai, United Arab Emirates	3rd	2:08:01
March 16, 2008	Seoul International Marathon	Seoul, South Korea	1st	2:07:32
March 22, 2009	Tokyo Marathon	Tokyo, Japan	4th	2:11:57
April 28, 2012	Jeonju-Gunsan Marathon	Jeonju, South Korea	1st	2:11:29
October 21, 2012	Gongju Dong-A Marathon	Gongju, South Korea	11th	2:12:00
