= Silvana Cucchietti =

Italian long-distance runner

Personal information
- National team: Italy (3 caps in 1987-1993)
- Born: 30 December 1957 (age 68) Vernante, Italy

Sport
- Country: Italy
- Sport: Athletics
- Event: Long-distance running

Achievements and titles
- Personal best: Marathon: 2:37:23 (1987)

Silvana Cucchietti (born 30 December 1957) is a former Italian female long-distance runner who competed at individual senior level at the IAAF World Women's Road Race Championships.

She won Rome Marathon in 1990, Turin Marathon in 1988, Ferrara Marathon in 1990 and 1991 and Roma-Ostia Half Marathon in 1987.

== National titles ==
She won a national championships at individual senior level.

- Italian Athletics Championships
  - Half marathon: 1990
