= Andrew Eyapan =

Kenyan long-distance runner

Medal record

Men's athletics

Representing Kenya

African Championships
Bronze medal – third place	1990 Cairo	20 km walk

Andrew Ekai Eyapan (born December 12, 1965) is a long-distance runner from Kenya, who won the 1998 edition of the Vienna Marathon. He is a former race walker, who won the bronze medal in the men's 20 km Walk at the 1990 African Championships in Cairo, Egypt. He won the Berlin Half Marathon in 1998.

== Achievements ==
Year	Competition	Venue	Position	Event	Notes
Representing Kenya
1999	Vienna Marathon	Vienna, Austria	1st	Marathon	2:11:41
2003	Ferrara Marathon	Ferrara, Italy	1st	Marathon	2:20:52.8
