= Florence Barsosio =

Kenyan long-distance runner

Personal information
- Full name: Florence Jepkemoi Barsosio
- Nationality: Kenyan
- Born: 18 August 1976 (age 49)

Sport
- Sport: Running
- Event(s): Half marathon, Marathon

Florence Jepkemoi Barsosio (born 11 August 1976 in Keiyo District) is a Kenyan athlete who specialises in long-distance running. Her sister, Sally Barsosio, is also a professional runner.

She has competed at world championship finals in long-distance track events, cross country running and road running. The majority of her success has come in marathon races: she won the 2000 Turin Marathon in her debut over the distance and has gone on to win marathons in Paris, Madrid, Florence and Vienna.

Barsosio has taken part in two New York Marathons: finishing fifth in 2000 (with her 2:27:00 personal best performance), and eleventh at the 2001 race. Her only Marathon World Championship race came in 2001 and she finished in sixth position. She has also competed over the half marathon distance and has won the Paris Half Marathon and Prague Half Marathon.

== Early career ==
The older sister of 10,000 metres World Champion Sally Barsosio, Florence Barsosio began her career as a track and cross country runner. At the 1995 World Championships in Athletics she finished 13th in the women's 5000 metres final. She was the 1996 winner of the Cross della Vallagarina, Montefortiana Turà and Giro di Castelbuono competitions. She also finished in 13th place at the 1997 IAAF World Cross Country Championships in Turin. However, it was not until she began focusing on road running in the early 2000s that she found greater success.

At the start of 2000, Barsosio won in her debut marathon race, taking the Turin Marathon with a time of 2:27:58. and she took the Scalata al Castello 10 km title in Arezzo, Italy, soon after. She remained successful on the cross country circuit, with victories at the Cross de Caceres and the Cross Campaccio. She competed in the New York City Marathon later that year and recorded a personal best time of 2:27:00 to take fifth place. The following year she won both the Paris Marathon and Paris Half Marathon races and managed a sixth-place finish in the women's marathon at the 2001 World Championships in Athletics. She also took third at the New York Mini Marathon, eleventh at the New York Marathon, and won the Prague Half Marathon. After two successful seasons of road running, she decided to take time away from competition to get married and have a child.

== Return from pregnancy ==
Barsosio is married to Clement Komen. She gave birth to a son, Kevin Kiprono in October 2002. She made her competitive return in 2004 and soon regained her international standing. She won the Madrid Marathon and finished in second place at the Dublin Marathon. She ran virtually unopposed at the Florence Marathon that year, beating second placed Marcella Mancini by over five minutes. Barsosio's time of 2:29:11 was much faster than her previous outings and she was confident of returning to her full pre-pregnancy form for the following season.

Continuing to focus on the marathon in 2005, she finished second to Lidiya Grigoryeva at the Paris Marathon, although her time of 2:27:19 was her second fastest ever. A dominant performance followed at the Vienna Marathon: a high temperature affected all the runners, but she won the race by over eight minutes despite the fact that the race had no pacemaker. She closed the year with a second-place finish at the Taipei International Marathon in Taiwan, beaten to the title by Jane Ekimat Auro. She took second place at the Madrid Marathon in 2006.

== Personal bests ==
Surface	Event	Time (h:m:s)	Venue	Date
Track	3000 m	8:53.50	Nice, France	16 July 1997
Track	5000 m	15:20.51	Berlin, Germany	26 August 1997
Track	10,000 m	34:01.0	Novara, Italy	24 April 2005
Road	Half marathon	1:11:09	Paris, France	13 March 2000
Road	Marathon	2:27:00	New York City, United States	5 November 2000

- All information taken from IAAF profile.

== Major competition record ==
Year	Tournament	Place	Result	Distance	Time (h:m:s)
1995	World Championships in Athletics	Gothenburg, Sweden	13th	5000 metres	15:56.96
1997	World Cross Country Championships	Turin, Italy	13th	Long race	21:36
2001	World Championships in Athletics	Edmonton, Canada	6th	Marathon	2:28:36

=== Other competitions ===
- 1st – 2000 Turin Marathon, 2:27:58
- 1st – 2001 Paris Marathon
- 1st – 2001 Paris Half Marathon
- 1st – 2001 Prague Half Marathon
- 1st – 2004 Madrid Marathon
- 2nd – 2004 Dublin Marathon
- 1st – 2004 Florence Marathon
- 2nd – 2005 Paris Marathon
- 1st – 2005 Vienna Marathon
- 2nd – 2005 Taipei International Marathon
- 2nd – 2006 Madrid Marathon
