= Tiziana Alagia =

Italian long-distance runner (born 1973)

Personal information
- Nationality: Italian
- Born: March 8, 1973 (age 53) Lagonegro, Italy

Sport
- Country: Italy
- Sport: Athletics
- Event: Marathon

Achievements and titles
- Personal best: Marathon: 2:27.54 (2001)

Tiziana Alagia (born 8 March 1973) is a retired Italian long-distance runner who specialised in the marathon. She represented Italy at the World Championships in Athletics in 2001. A one-time Italian marathon champion, her best for the distance was 2:27:53 hours. She primarily competed in Italy and won marathon races in Florence, Carpi, Turin, Padova and Piacenza.

== Biography ==
Born in Lagonegro, Potenza, she started her international career at the 1992 IAAF World Cross Country Championships, where she came 41st in the junior race. Later that year she competed on the track at the 1992 World Junior Championships in Athletics and was 14th in the 10,000 metres final. She represented Italy at the 1995 IAAF World Half Marathon Championships and began to make her impact on the road running scene in the late 1990s under the tutelage of Renato Canova.

Alagia had consecutive wins at the Vivicittà Firenze 12K in 1997 and 1998. She made her debut over the marathon distance at the Millennium for Peace marathon in Assisi, coming fourth. She broke the women's course record to win at the Cannes Half Marathon in February 2002 and went on to take two marathon wins later that year, first at the Cesano Boscone Marathon and then the Florence Marathon. She ended a breakthrough year with a win at the Best Woman 10 km in Fiumicino.

A career best run of 1:11:29 for the half marathon brought her the women's title at the 2001 Rome-Ostia Half Marathon. The fastest marathon of her career followed in April, as she won the Turin Marathon in a time of 2:27:54 hours. These performances gained her two further senior international selections: she was 21st at that year's European Cup 10000m and was chosen for the marathon at the 2001 World Championships in Athletics, where she again finished in 21st (just behind team mate Rosaria Console). Alagia won her first national title in 2002, as she won the women's race at the Italian Marathon in Carpi in a time of 2:30:24 hours. She won the Maratona del Salento in Parabita that year. He only major appearance of 2003 came at the Florence Marathon, where she was third. She missed most of the season through injury, but vowed to return to top level competition the following year.

Alagia trained in Namibia at the start of 2003 and made her comeback with wins at the Piacenza Marathon (running a course record of 2:38:13) and the Stramilano Half Marathon. Making a rare appearance outside the Italian road circuit, she ran at the Berlin Marathon in September and came sixth. Her best run of 2005 was at the Rome City Marathon, where she was runner-up to Silvia Skvortsova in a time of 2:31:46 hours. She returned to the Stramilano to defend her title but came fourth overall. Her final year of top level competition was at the age of 33 in 2006. She won the Piacenza Marathon for a second time and was sixth at the Vienna Marathon.

== See also ==
- Italian all-time lists – Marathon
