= Rock 'n' Roll San Diego Marathon =

Annual race in the United States held since 1998

- Location: San Diego, California
- Event type: Road
- Distance: Marathon and half marathon
- Established: 1998 (28 years ago)
- Website: San Diego Marathon

The Rock 'n' Roll San Diego Marathon is an annual marathon race held in San Diego, California. Established in 1998, it is the original race in the Rock 'n' Roll Running Series. (Note: The series is organized by Advance Publications' Ironman Group.) The event includes a half marathon.

== History ==
The marathon was established in 1998.

The 2006 marathon had 21,159 participants—17,339 of whom successfully finished the race.

A half marathon race over 21.0975 kilometres (13.1094 mi) was added to supplement the established full marathon race from the 2010 edition onwards.

In 2013, Bernard Koech set the half marathon course record of 58:41. This was the fourth-fastest time ever for the event at the time, although the time did not meet official IAAF requirements as the course contained an excessive downhill.

The 2020 edition of the race was cancelled due to the COVID-19 pandemic. (Note: It had initially been postponed before being cancelled.)

== Course ==
External images
- Course map of all races in 2010
- Course map of full marathon in 2019

The marathon originally commenced at 6th Avenue at Palm and concluded on Broadway Avenue downtown San Diego. The following year, the finish moved to the Naval Training Center, and three years later moved to the Parade Deck at Marine Corps Recruit Depot San Diego. In 2010 a new course was defined which ended at SeaWorld San Diego. In 2013, the course was again re-routed with a new finish line at Petco Park. There is also a half-marathon over portions of the same course and a four-person relay option.

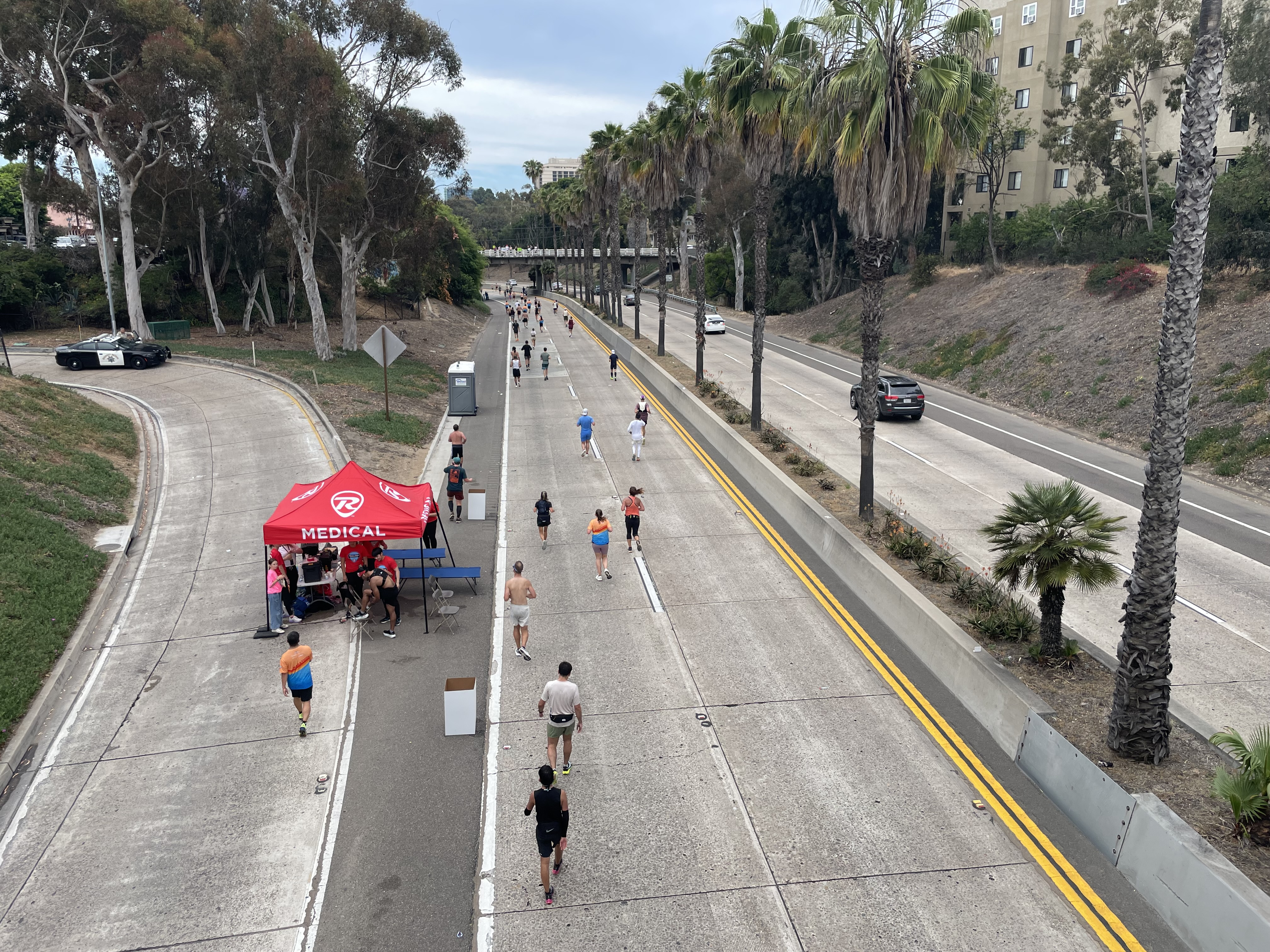
Runners headed south along California State Route 163 in 2025.

Runners have seven hours in which to complete the marathon. The four-person relay option has a four-hour time limit.

== Foundation controversy ==
Since its inception, the marathon claims to have raised in excess of $100 million for charities.

In 2008 the Competitor Group took over Elite Racing, the company that had been organizing the Rock 'n' Roll Marathon. The following year, 2009, an internal audit revealed that the charity in whose name the race had been run, Elite Racing Foundation for Children, Education & Medical Research, had been improperly commingling funds with the for-profit Elite Racing. It further found that the foundation was being operated "in many instances for the benefit of the for-profit," and that the charity's role in hosting the races had been overstated. As a result, the race had benefited improperly from hundreds of thousands of dollars in public subsidies and grants. In announcing the results of the audit, Competitor said it would return $190,500 to San Diego County and $152,544 to the City of San Diego, spend the remaining foundation funds on health and wellness causes, file amended tax returns, and dissolve the foundation. Competitor Group made the final payments in October 2009. Altogether the company returned $344,176 to the city and county.

== Records ==
In 2015, Harriette Thompson of Charlotte, North Carolina, completed the Rock 'n' Roll San Diego Marathon at the age of 92 years, 65 days, thus becoming the oldest woman to complete a marathon. In 2017, at the same event, she became the oldest woman to finish a half marathon, at age 94.

== Winners ==
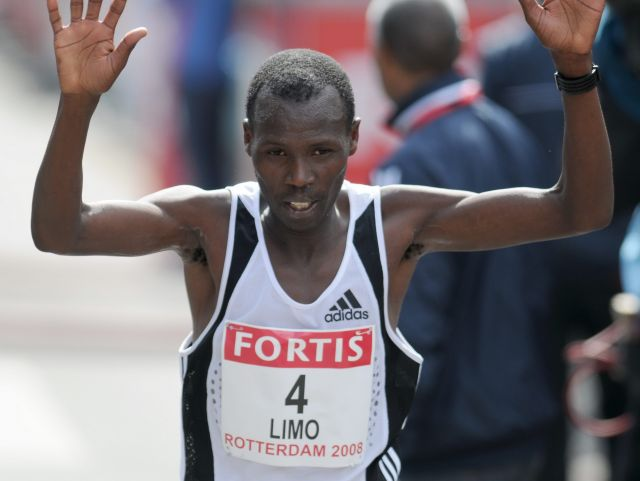
Richard Limo secured victory in 2010 – his first marathon win

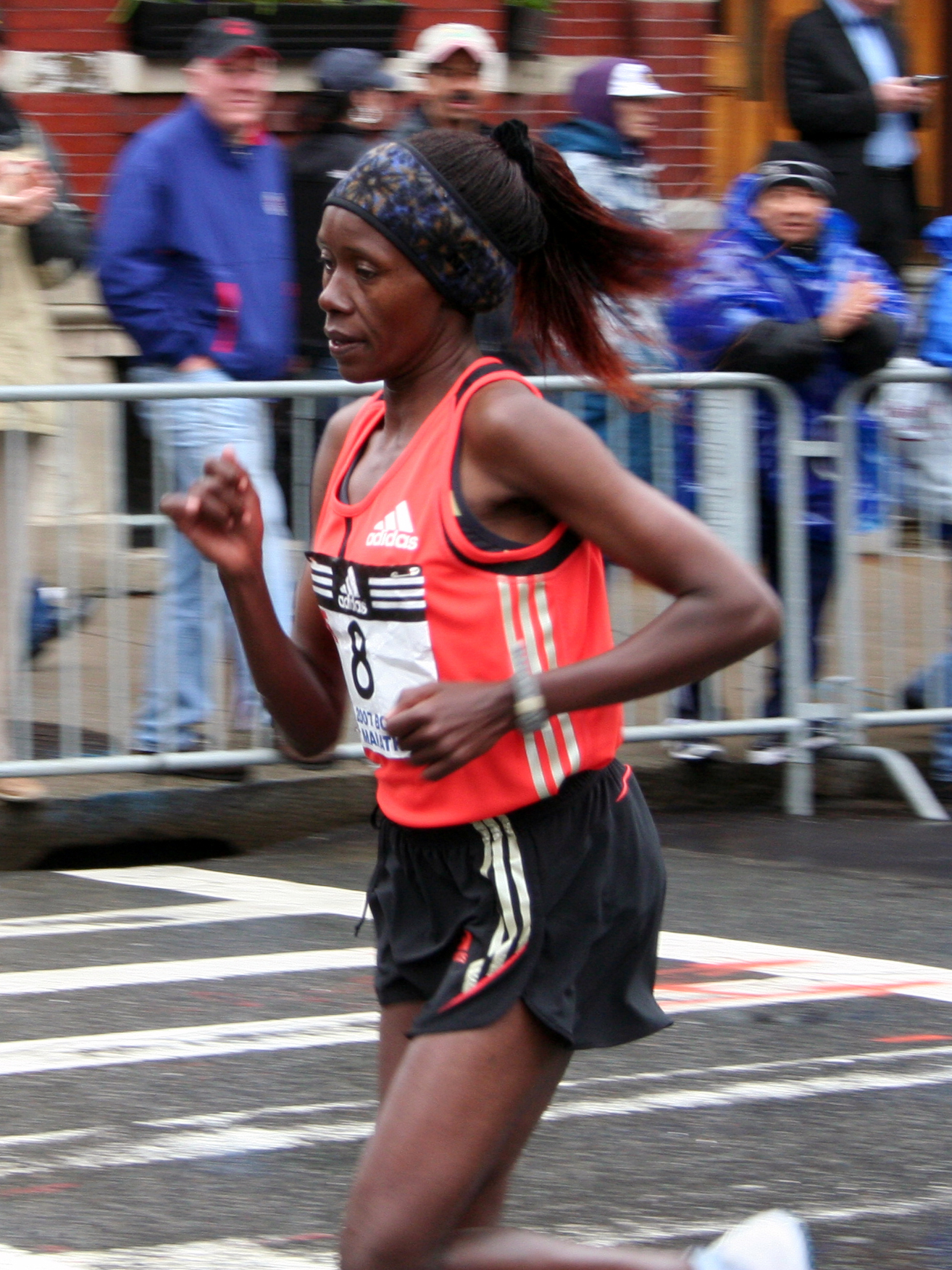
Alice Chelangat of Kenya was the 2006 women's race winner

=== Marathon ===
Key: Course record (in bold)

Ed.	Year	Men's winner	Time	Women's winner	Time	Rf.
1	1998.06.21	Philip Tarus (KEN)	2:10:42	Nadezhda Ilyina (RUS)	2:34:17	
2	1999.05.23	Philip Tarus (KEN)	**2:08:33**	Irina Bogachova (KGZ)	2:28:46	
3	2000.06.04	Wolashe Belay (ETH)	2:12:45	Margaret Okayo (KEN)	2:27:05	
4	2001.06.03	John Kagwe (KEN)	2:10:07	Margaret Okayo (KEN)	2:25:05	
5	2002.06.02	Sammy Korir (KEN)	2:09:02	Alice Chelangat (KEN)	2:29:57	
6	2003.06.01	Osoro Ondoro (KEN)	2:09:38	Irina Bogachova (KGZ)	2:29:52	
7	2004.06.06	Joseph Ngolepus (KEN)	2:11:04	Tatyana Titova (RUS)	2:29:36	
8	2005.06.05	Christopher Cheboiboch (KEN)	2:09:17	Gete Wami (ETH)	2:30:55	
9	2006.06.04	Ambesse Tolosa (ETH)	2:10:08	Alice Chelangat (KEN)	2:28:21	
10	2007.06.03	Daniel Yego (KEN)	2:09:04	Hellen Jemaiyo Kimutai (KEN)	2:32:40	
11	2008.06.01	Simon Wangai (KEN)	2:10:07	Yulia Gromova (RUS)	2:28:23	
12	2009.05.31	Khalid El-Boumlili (MAR)	2:11:16	Yulia Gromova (RUS)	2:27:37	
13	2010.06.06	Richard Limo (KEN)	2:09:56	Yulia Gromova (RUS)	2:27:38	
14	2011.06.05	Terfa Negari (ETH)	2:11:18	Bizunesh Deba (ETH)	**2:23:31**	
15	2012.06.03	Nixon Machichim (KEN)	2:10:03	Alevtina Ivanova (RUS)	2:27:44	
16	2013.06.03	Simon Njoroge (KEN)	2:15:00	Natalya Sergeyeva (RUS)	2:35:05	
17	2014.06.01	Ben Bruce (USA)	2:23:50	Anna Corrigan (USA)	2:44:27	
18	2015.05.31	Igor Campos (USA)	2:37:02	Lenore Moreno (USA)	2:41:39	
19	2016.06.05	Eric Noel (USA)	2:26:39	McKale Davis (USA)	2:56:15	
20	2017.06.04	Jeffrey Eggleston (USA)	2:21:17	Bridie McCarey (USA)	2:48:47	
21	2018.06.03	August Brautigam (USA)	2:33:25	Karen Lockyer (NZL)	2:55:22	
22	2019.06.02	Bradley Wattleworth (USA)	2:25:50	Jennifer Brill (USA)	2:57:49	
	2020	cancelled due to coronavirus pandemic				
23	2021.10.24	Jeff Devlin (USA)	2:41:45	Sammi Groce (USA)	2:50:30	
24	2022.06.05	Kellen Blumberg (USA)	2:28:17	Bonnie Keating (USA)	2:44:58	
25	2023	Chris Frias (USA)	2:29:23	Bonnie Axman Keating (USA)	2:45:47	
26	2024	Daniel Ortiz (USA)	2:28:38	Dakota Bliler (USA)	2:52:26	

=== Half marathon ===
Ed.	Year	Men's winner	Time	Women's winner	Time	Rf.
1	2010.06.06	Sergio Gonzalez (USA)	1:07:18	Jacquelyne Gallegos (USA)	1:21:04	
2	2011.06.05	Meb Keflezighi (USA)	1:02:40	Gina Slaby (USA)	1:16:33	
3	2012.06.03	Meb Keflezighi (USA)	1:03:11	Kim Smith (NZL)	1:08:37	
4	2013.06.03	Bernard Koech (KEN)	**58:41**	Edna Kiplagat (KEN)	1:08:57	
5	2014.06.01	Solomon Deksisa (ETH)	1:00:12	Birhane Dibaba (ETH)	1:09:33	
6	2015.05.31	Jordan Chipangama (USA)	1:02:24	Eri Hayakawa (JPN)	1:10:47	
7	2016.06.05	Scott Smith (USA)	1:02:34	Shalane Flanagan (USA)	**1:07:51**	
8	2017.06.04	Tsegay Tuemay (ERI)	1:01:39	Biruktayit Degefa (ETH)	1:10:13	
9	2018.06.03	Titus Ekiru (KEN)	1:01:02	Meseret Dafar (ETH)	1:08:26	
10	2019.06.02	Bernard Ngeno (KEN)	1:00:08	Rahma Tusa (USA)	1:09:08	
	2020	cancelled due to coronavirus pandemic				
11	2021.10.24	Spencer Johnson (USA)	1:06:06	Sophie Rubi (USA)	1:12:02	
12	2022.06.05	Reid Buchanan (USA)	1:04:01	Jane Bareikis (USA)	1:14:46	
13	2023	Kibrom Elias (USA)	1:05:07	Zoe Baker (USA)	1:15:49	
14	2024	Ayrton Ledesma (MEX)	1:03:39	Lisa Goodin (USA)	1:15:39	
