= Csaba Szűcs =

Hungarian long-distance runner

Csaba Szűcs (born 29 January 1965 in Kiskunfélegyháza, Bács-Kiskun) is a retired Hungarian athlete, who specialized in the long-distance running events. He represented his native Central European country at the 1992 Summer Olympics in Barcelona, Spain, where he did not finish the race.

He was the winner of the 1989 Italian Marathon and also won the Lille Marathon in 1993. He was selected for the Hungarian team at the 1990 European Athletics Championships and finished in ninth place in the marathon.

== Personal best ==
- Marathon — 2.12.10 (1993)

== Achievements ==
| Year | Competition | Venue | Position | Event | Notes |
Representing Hungary
| 1989 | Italian Marathon | Carpi, Italy | 1st | Marathon | 2:15:43 |
| 1990 | European Championships | Split, FR Yugoslavia | 11th | Marathon | 2:20:48 |
| 1992 | Olympic Games | Barcelona, Spain | — | Marathon | DNF |
| 1993 | Lille Marathon | Lille, France | 1st | Marathon | 2:14:24 |
