= Athletics at the 1987 Summer Universiade – Men's marathon =

The men's marathon event at the 1987 Summer Universiade was held in Zagreb on 19 July 1987.

== Results ==
Rank	Athlete	Nationality	Time	Notes
1st place, gold medalist(s)	Takahiro Izumi	Japan	2:24:23	
2nd place, silver medalist(s)	Takashi Murakami	Japan	2:24:55	
3rd place, bronze medalist(s)	Viktor Gural	Soviet Union	2:27:01	
4	Fedor Ryzhov	Soviet Union	2:27:24	
5	Mirko Vindiš	Yugoslavia	2:27:42	
6	Dragan Isailović	Yugoslavia	2:28:10	
7	Kim Won-tak	South Korea	2:28:45	
8	Lee Jong-hee	South Korea	2:30:38	
9	Stephen Brace	Great Britain	2:33:26	
10	Mladen Grgić	Yugoslavia	2:37:00	
11	Hsu Gi-sheng	Chinese Taipei	2:37:55	
12	Cho Hui Bok	North Korea	2:39:30	
13	James Njeru	Kenya	2:42:20	
14	Eddie Kilindo	Seychelles	2:42:50	
15	Metin Deǧirmenci	Turkey	2:44:33	
16	Dilip Karki Kumar	Nepal	2:45:18	
17	Hsu Kuang-piao	Chinese Taipei	2:45:46	
18	Ryu Ok Hyon	North Korea	2:46:23	
19	Song Jae-pil	South Korea	2:55:26	
20	Suedi Abdallah	Tanzania	3:09:25	
	Fausto Molinari	Italy	DNF	
	Dmitriy Feoktistov	Soviet Union	DNF	
	Dmitry Trots	Soviet Union	DNF	
	Daniel Caprioglio	United States	DNF	
	Krzysztof Niedziółka	Poland	DNF	
	Sushil Narsing Rana	Nepal	DNF	
	Semir Berber	Turkey	DNF	
