= 1999 European Athletics U23 Championships – Women's 10,000 metres =

The women's 10,000 metres event at the 1999 European Athletics U23 Championships was held in Gothenburg, Sweden, at Ullevi on 30 July 1999.

== Medalists ==
Gold	Olivera Jevtić; Yugoslavia
Silver	Rosaria Console; Italy
Bronze	Patricia Arribas; Spain

== Results ==
=== Final ===
30 July

Rank	Name	Nationality	Time	Notes
1st place, gold medalist(s)	Olivera Jevtić	Yugoslavia	32:37.59	CR
2nd place, silver medalist(s)	Rosaria Console	Italy	33:05.77	
3rd place, bronze medalist(s)	Patricia Arribas	Spain	33:23.01	
4	Catherine Lallemand	Belgium	33:27.90	
5	Živilė Balčiūnaitė	Lithuania	33:47.13	
6	Ileana Dorca	Romania	33:48.22	
7	Manoli Domínguez	Spain	34:09.80	
8	Sandra Hervas	Spain	34:12.95	
9	Birhan Dagne	Great Britain	34:24.70	
10	Sheila Fairweather	Great Britain	34:32.70	
11	Elizabeth Allott	Great Britain	34:59.79	
	Beáta Rankoczai	Hungary	DNF	

== Participation ==
According to an unofficial count, 12 athletes from 8 countries participated in the event.

- Belgium (1)
- Great Britain (3)
- Hungary (1)
- Italy (1)
- Lithuania (1)
- Romania (1)
- Spain (3)
- Yugoslavia (1)
