= Ferrara Marathon =

Annual marathon in Ferrara, Italy

- Date: March
- Location: Ferrara, Italy
- Event type: Road
- Distance: Marathon
- Established: 1979
- Course records: Men: (Kenya) Patrick Chumba 2:12:39; Women: (United Kingdom) Sally Goldsmith 2:34:11
- Website: Ferrara Marathon

The Ferrara Marathon is an annual marathon competition hosted by the city of Ferrara, Italy. The inaugural year was 1979. The race was held in nearby Vigarano Mainarda for 1999 and earlier.

== Past winners ==
Key: Course record

Edition	Date	Men's winner	Time (h:m:s)	Women's winner	Time (h:m:s)
38th	19/03/2017	Michael Casolin (ITA)	2:30:24	Bojana Bjeljac (CRO)	2:41:12
37th	20/03/2016	Andrea Aragno (ITA)	2:27:14	Josann Attard Pulis (MLT)	2:52:51
36th	15/03/2015	Rudy Magagnoli (ITA)	2:28:33	Elehanna Silvani (ITA)	3:05:35
35th	16/03/2014	Mikhail Kulkov (RUS)	2:21:20	Claudia Gelsomino (ITA)	2:49:43
34th	24/03/2013	Francesco Caliandro (ITA)	2:28:40	Barbara Cimmarusti (ITA)	2:59:19
33rd	25/03/2012	Pietro Cabassi (ITA)	2:35:34	Ilaria Zaccagni (ITA)	2:58:28
32nd	27/03/2011	Zakayo Biwott (KEN)	2:25:06	Salina Kosgei (KEN)	2:50:56
—	28/03/2010	Race was cancelled			
31st	08/03/2009	Alberto Felloni (ITA)	2:38:30	Antonija Orlić (CRO)	3:04:51
30th	09/03/2008	Alexander Medhanie (ERI)	2:15:24.1	Antonija Orlić (CRO)	2:57:51.7
29th	11/03/2007	Festus Kioko (KEN)	2:19:52	Marina Zanardi (ITA)	2:56:15
28th	19/03/2006	Benson Mbithi (KEN)	2:12:58	Paola Ventrella (ITA)	2:43:52
27th	20/03/2005	Graziano Giordanengo (ITA)	2:31:17	Katia Bianchini (ITA)	3:05:42
26th	21/03/2004	Pius Maritim (KEN)	2:13:02.7	Paola Ventrella (ITA)	2:53:21.8
25th	16/03/2003	Andrew Eyapan (KEN)	2:20:52.8	Isabelle LeDroit (CAN)	2:45:14.0
24th	17/03/2002	Dominic Bannister (GBR)	2:16:19	Karin Schön (SWE)	2:38:22
23rd	11/03/2001	Francis Kipketer (KEN)	2:15:21.2	Isabelle LeDroit (CAN)	2:38:58.8
22nd	12/03/2000	Ezekiel Kibiwot (KEN)	2:13:08	Giustina Menna (ITA)	2:43:05
21st	14/03/1999	Patrick Chumba (KEN)	2:14:34a	Gigliola Borghini (ITA)	2:35:45a
20th	01/03/1998	Patrick Chumba (KEN)	2:12:39	Galina Zhulyeva (UKR)	2:44:10
19th	02/03/1997	Zebedayo Bayo (TAN)	2:14:12	Irina Khramova (RUS)	2:45:50
18th	03/03/1996	Clair Wathier (BRA)	2:14:10	Sally Goldsmith (GBR)	2:34:11
17th	19/03/1995	Petr Pipa (SVK)	2:17:12	Ornella Ferrara (ITA)	2:39:34
16th	20/03/1994	Marco Di Lieto (ITA)	2:19:41	Dana Hajná (CZE)	2:48:47
15th	21/03/1993	Marcello Curioni (ITA)	2:15:37	Maura Bulzoni (ITA)	3:00:41
14th	15/03/1992	Mirko Vindiš (SLO)	2:17:29	Weronika Gierwatowska (POL)	2:51:11
13th	17/03/1991	Roberto Cassi (ITA)	2:23:11	Silvana Cucchietti (ITA)	2:44:17
12th	18/03/1990	Marjon Krempl (YUG)	2:18:50	Silvana Cucchietti (ITA)	2:47:52
11th	19/03/1989	Mauro Irrera (ITA)	2:20:35	Maria Rita Zanaboni (ITA)	3:04:13
10th	20/03/1988	Sergio Pesavento (ITA)	2:19:03	Maura Bulzoni (ITA)	2:56:27
9th	15/03/1987	Renato Lavina (ITA)	2:20:31	Maura Bulzoni (ITA)	2:59:25
8th	16/03/1986	Sergio Fabbri (ITA)	2:22:08	Sandra Gatti (ITA)	3:16:49
7th	17/03/1985	Paolo Morandini (ITA)	2:24:01	Fabrizia Buffon (ITA)	3:16:32
6th	18/03/1984	Giuseppe Rossetti (ITA)	2:29:37	Adriana Alessandrini (ITA)	3:13:53
5th	20/03/1983	Mauro Cilia (ITA)	2:32:06	Adriana Alessandrini (ITA)	3:25:59
4th	21/03/1982	Massimo Franchi (ITA)	2:24:02	Anna Messina (ITA)	3:29:31
3rd	22/03/1981	Loris Gennari (ITA)	2:26:31	Iside Bentivogli (ITA)	3:40:25
2nd	30/03/1980	Giuseppe Rossetti (ITA)	2:30:01	Patrizia Dall'Olio (ITA)	3:40:54
1st	28/04/1979	Loris Gennari (ITA)	2:29:01	No competition	
