= Roma–Ostia Half Marathon =

Road running event in Rome, Italy

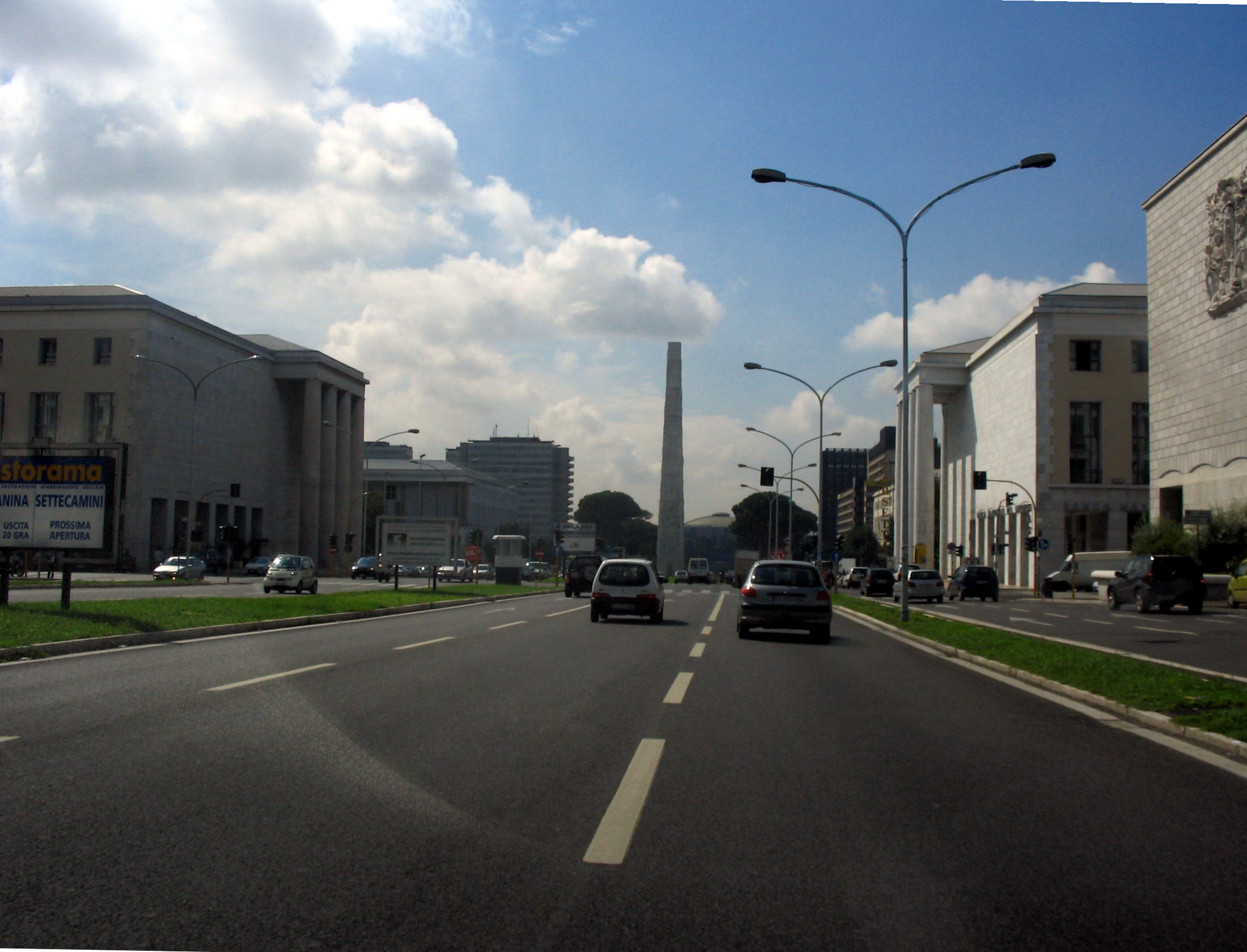
- A view of Via Cristoforo Colombo, where the race begins
- Date: Mid-March
- Location: Rome, Italy
- Event type: Road
- Distance: Half marathon
- Established: 1974
- Course records: Men's: 58:02 (2022) (Kenya) Sabastian Sawe; Women's: 1:06:03 (2022) (Kenya) Irene Kimais
- Website: Roma-Ostia Half Marathon
- Participants: 5,695 finishers (2022); 4,534 finishers (2021); 8,458 (2019)

The Roma–Ostia Half Marathon (Italian: Roma Ostia Mezza Maratona or Maratonina Roma-Ostia) is an annual half marathon road running event which takes place in early March in Rome, Italy. The course begins in the EUR district of the city and follows a direct southeasterly route to the finish point near the beaches of Ostia. It is Italy's most popular half marathon, with a record 12,000 entries and 9,485 finishers in 2011.

The competition is organised by the Gruppo Sportivo Bancari Romani in partnership with RCS Sports & Events comprises three distinct races. There is an elite level race for male and female athletes, a popular fun run for amateurs, and a "Business Run" which sees teams of runners represent domestic companies in the Campionato Italian Imprenditori di Mezza Maratona (Italian Business Championships in the Half Marathon). The Roma-Ostia race has been held every year since its inception, with the exceptions of 1982 and 1999.

The race was inaugurated in March 1974 and was held on a 28-kilometre course. In its first dozen editions, the Roma-Ostia ranged from a distance of 27 km to 30 km. It was converted into an official half marathon race of 21.1 km for the 1987 edition and has remained so ever since. The course has a point-to-point format and as a result it some editions have had an overall downhill drop, as well as athlete-assisting tailwinds. Due to these factors, some performances have been ineligible for personal bests or records.

In 2011 the course was significantly altered, allowing for faster times and record performances. Both the men's and women's course records were set in 2012. Philemon Kimeli Limo's time of 59:32 minutes stands as the men's course record, while Florence Kiplagat's run of 1:06:38 is the current record for females.

The 2020 edition of the race was cancelled due to the coronavirus pandemic.

Past winners of the elite race include Stefano Baldini (the 2004 Olympic marathon champion), four-time Boston Marathon winner Robert Kipkoech Cheruiyot, Franca Fiacconi (1998 New York Marathon winner), Olympic marathon bronze medalist Galen Rupp, 2020 Tokyo Marathon winner Lonah Chemtai Salpeter, and Mediterranean champion Souad Aït Salem.

== Past winners ==
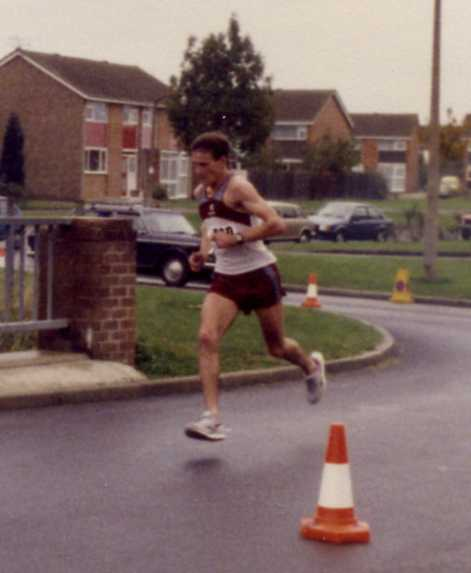
Welshman Steve Jones was among the first foreign-born winners of the Roma-Ostia.

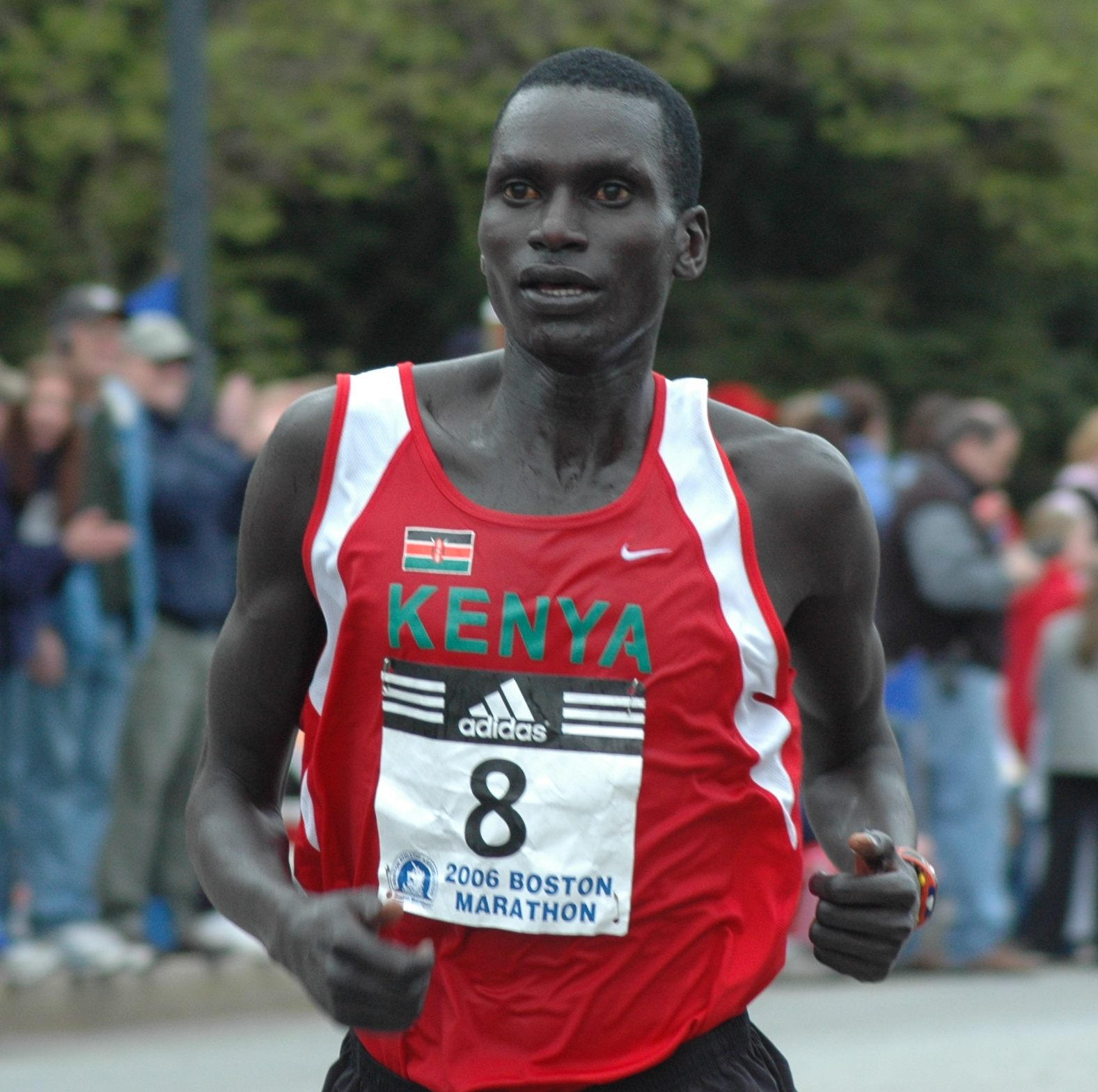
Robert Kipkoech Cheruiyot of Kenya won the 2002 race.

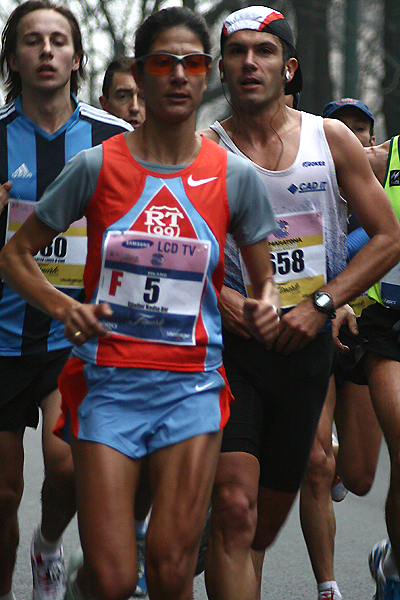
Nadia Ejjafini (then representing Bahrain) became Asia's first winner in 2006.

Key: Course record Race distance 27–30 km

Edition	Year	Men's winner	Time (h:m:s)	Women's winner	Time (h:m:s)
I	1974	Umberto Risi (ITA)	1:28:54	Manuela Mausoli (ITA)	2:05:59
II	1975	Paolo Accaputo (ITA)	1:29:46	Maria Pirozzi (ITA)	2:07:23
III	1976	Alessandro Cervigni (ITA)	1:27:55	Adriana Pedaletti (ITA)	2:06:43
IV	1977	Antonio Erotavo (ITA)	1:27:42	Adriana Pedaletti (ITA)	2:05:38
V	1978	Umberto Risi (ITA)	1:31:47	Chiara Castellani (ITA)	2:07:17
VI	1979	Marco Marchei (ITA)	1:27:10	Maura Bertetto (ITA)	2:07:55
VII	1980	Marco Marchei (ITA)	1:34:01	Rossana Matrella (ITA)	2:11:46
VIII	1981	Dereje Nedi (ETH)	1:21:20	Silvana Cruciata (ITA)	1:42:06
—	1982	Cancelled			
IX	1983	Bernard Ford (GBR)	1:24:30	Rita Marchisio (ITA)	1:38:53
X	1984	Salvatore Nicosia (ITA)	1:25:04	Silvana Cruciata (ITA)	1:40:56
XI	1985	Steve Jones (GBR)	1:26:25	Maria Curatolo (ITA)	1:43:13
XII	1986	Loris Pimazzoni (ITA)	1:34:13	Angie Pain (GBR)	1:50:13
XIII	1987	Salvatore Nicosia (ITA)	1:02:12	Silvana Cucchietti (ITA)	1:14:32
XIV	1988	El Mostafa Nechchadi (MAR)	1:04:32	Glynis Penny (GBR)	1:15:02
XV	1989	Carl Thackery (GBR)	1:02:10	Graziella Striuli (ITA)	1:14:35
XVI	1990	Carl Thackery (GBR)	1:01:44	Rakiya Maraoui (MAR)	1:14:56
XVII	1991	Juma Mnyampanda (TAN)	1:02:34	Izabela Zatorska (POL)	1:13:02
XVIII	1992	Andrew Masai (KEN)	1:02:18	Anna Villani (ITA)	1:12:12
XIX	1993	Andrew Masai (KEN)	1:02:23	Anna Villani (ITA)	1:12:34
XX	1994	Saïd Ermili (MAR)	1:02:27	Tatiana Oussacheva (RUS)	1:14:59
XXI	1995	Giovanni Ruggiero (ITA)	1:02:53	Rosanna Munerotto (ITA)	1:11:36
XXII	1996	Philemon Metto (KEN)	1:01:53	Patrizia Ritondo (ITA)	1:13:07
XXIII	1997	Stefano Baldini (ITA)	1:00:56	Rosanna Munerotto (ITA)	1:12:50
XXIV	1998	Philip Chirchir (KEN)	1:02:23	Franca Fiacconi (ITA)	1:13:19
—	1999	Not held			
XXV	2000	Francesco Ingargiola (ITA)	1:01:19	Maura Viceconte (ITA)	1:11:07
XXVI	2001	Giuliano Battocletti (ITA)	1:02:24	Tiziana Alagia (ITA)	1:11:29
XXVII	2002	Robert Cheruiyot (KEN)	1:00:06	Gloria Marconi (ITA)	1:11:31
XXVIII	2003	Boniface Usisivu (KEN)	1:01:13	Gloria Marconi (ITA)	1:09:25
XXIX	2004	Paul Kirui (KEN)	1:00:22	Hafida Izem (MAR)	1:10:39
XXX	2005	James Kwambai (KEN)	1:00:45	Rosaria Console (ITA)	1:09:34
XXXI	2006	William Rotich (KEN)	1:00:12	Nadia Ejjafini (BHR)	1:10:43
XXXII	2007	Benson Barus (KEN)	1:00:18	Souad Aït Salem (ALG)	1:10:29
XXXIII	2008	Jonathan Kipkorir (KEN)	1:00:19	Souad Aït Salem (ALG)	1:09:15
XXXIV	2009	Elijah Keitany (KEN)	1:00:59	Anna Incerti (ITA)	1:09:24
XXXV	2010	Peter Kimeli (KEN)	1:01:51	Alice Timbilil (KEN)	1:10:34
XXXVI	2011	Tujuba Megersa (ETH)	59:58	Anna Incerti (ITA)	1:09:06
XXXVII	2012	Philemon Limo (KEN)	59:32	Florence Kiplagat (KEN)	1:06:38
XXXVIII	2013	Wilson Kiprop (KEN)	59:15	Flomena Cheyech (KEN)	1:07:39
XXXIX	2014	Aziz Lahbabi (MAR)	59:25	Caroline Chepkwony (KEN)	1:08:48
XL	2015	Robert Chemosin (KEN)	59:37	Amane Beriso (ETH)	1:08:43
XLI	2016	Solomon Yego (KEN)	58:44	Worknesh Degefa (ETH)	1:07:08
XLII	2017	Guye Adola (ETH)	59:18	Gladys Cherono (KEN)	1:07:01
XLIII	2018	Galen Rupp (USA)	59:47	Haftamnesh Tesfay (ETH)	1:09:02
XLIV	2019	Guye Adola (ETH)	1:00:17	Lonah Chemtai Salpeter (ISR)	1:06:40
	2020	Cancelled due to coronavirus outbreak			
XLV	2021	Abdisa Tola (ETH)	59:54	Joyce Tele (KEN)	1:06:35
XLVI	2022	Sabastian Sawe (KEN)	58:02	Irene Kimais (KEN)	1:06:03
XLVII	2023	Isaac Kipkemboi (KEN)	59:17	Dorcas Tuitoek (KEN)	1:06:21
XLVIII	2024	Emmanuel Wafula (KEN)	1:01:10	Mary Ngugi (KEN)	1:07:38
XLVIX	2025	Gideon Kiprotich (KEN)	58:49	Ludwina Chepngetich (KEN)	1:08:20
XLVX	2026	Michael Kiplangat Temoi (KEN)	58:00	Janeth Nyiva Mutungi (KEN)	1:08:11

=== Wins by country ===
Country	Men's	Women's	Total
Italy	14	26	40
Kenya	22	11	33
Ethiopia	5	3	8
Great Britain	4	2	6
Morocco	3	2	5
Algeria	0	2	2
Bahrain	0	1	1
Israel	0	1	1
Poland	0	1	1
Russia	0	1	1
Tanzania	1	0	1
United States	1	0	1
