= Mirko Vindiš =

Slovenian long-distance runner

Personal information
- Nationality: Slovenian
- Born: 8 November 1963 (age 62) Ptuj, SR Slovenia, SFR Yugoslavia

Sport
- Sport: Long-distance running
- Event: Marathon

Achievements and titles
- Personal bests: ½ marathon: 1:03:28; Marathon: 2:13:39

Miroslavo ("Mirko") Vindiš (born 8 November 1963 in Ptuj) is a retired long-distance runner from Slovenia, who won the 1988 edition of the Vienna Marathon. He represented Yugoslavia (1988) and Slovenia (1992) in the men's marathon at the Summer Olympics. Vindiš set his personal best time of 2:13:39 at the 1987 New York City Marathon, finishing about two-and-a-half minutes behind winner Ibrahim Hussein of Kenya. He also represented Yugoslavia and Slovenia in the marathon at the World Championships in Athletics.

He also ran ultramarathons and was the bronze medallist at the IAU 100 km European Championships in 2001.

== Achievements ==
Year	Competition	Venue	Position	Event	Notes
Representing Yugoslavia
1987	Universiade	Zagreb, Yugoslavia	5th	Marathon	2:27:42
1987	World Championships	Rome, Italy	14th	Marathon	2:18:09
1988	Vienna Marathon	Vienna, Austria	1st	Marathon	2:17:25
1988	Italian Marathon	Carpi, Italy	1st	Marathon	2:16:28
1990	European Championships	Split, Yugoslavia	12th	Marathon	2:21:05
Representing Slovenia
1992	Ferrara Marathon	Ferrara, Italy	1st	Marathon	2:17:29
1992	Olympic Games	Barcelona, Spain	40th	Marathon	2:21:03
1993	World Championships	Stuttgart, Germany	19th	Marathon	2:23:31
1994	European Championships	Helsinki, Finland	—	Marathon	DNF
