= Ben Chebet Kipruto =

Kenyan long-distance runner (born 1982)

Ben Chebet Kipruto (born 22 February 1982) is a Kenyan long-distance runner who competes professionally in marathon races. He is coached by Italian trainer Claudio Berardelli. He has a personal best time of 2:09:26 hours for the marathon distance and has won a number races in Europe, including the Italian Marathon, Florence Marathon and Maratona di Sant'Antonio in Padua.

== Biography ==
Kipruto began to establish himself on the European circuit as he won the 2004 Cross der Vlaanderen and then won at the 2005 Tirol Speed Marathon in Innsbruck in a time of 2:12:04 hours. He was the runner-up at the Shanghai Marathon later that year. He won the Maratona d'Europa in Trieste in May 2006. At the Athens Classic Marathon, he was among the race leaders up to the 39th kilometre, but he faded badly over the last two kilometres and ended up in ninth place. He was one of several runners under the course record time at the 2007 Valencia Marathon and placed fourth in a close finish. He returned to the Trieste race in May, but managed only fifth on that occasion.

He demonstrated his improving form in 2008, beginning with a win at the Alexander the Great Marathon. He improved his best time by over a minute with a victory in 2:10:50 hours at the Italian Marathon in Carpi. The following season marked further progression as he set a best of 2:09:42 hours at the Maratona di Sant'Antonio in Padua, breaking the race record and becoming the first runner to complete the course in under two hours and ten minutes He dropped out mid-race with stomach problems at the Venice Marathon in October, but he was keen not to waste his preparation for the distance and signed up for the Florence Marathon in November instead. He held off Reuben Kosgei by one second to claim the men's title in Florence, taking a second consecutive win of the year.

Chebet was among the leading runners at the 2010 Rome City Marathon up to the 30 km mark, but dropped out. He was the runner-up at Australia's Gold Coast Marathon in his first race in the Southern Hemisphere. He attempted to win at the Padua race for a second time in 2011 and came close, running a personal best of 2:09:26 hours and coming second only to Ethiopian Aredo Tolesa Tadese. He was also runner-up at the Buenos Aires Marathon later that year. Chebet was beaten to the Padua title for a second time in 2012, being second place behind Robert Kwambai Kipkorir on that occasion.
