= Alice Chelangat =

Kenyan long-distance runner

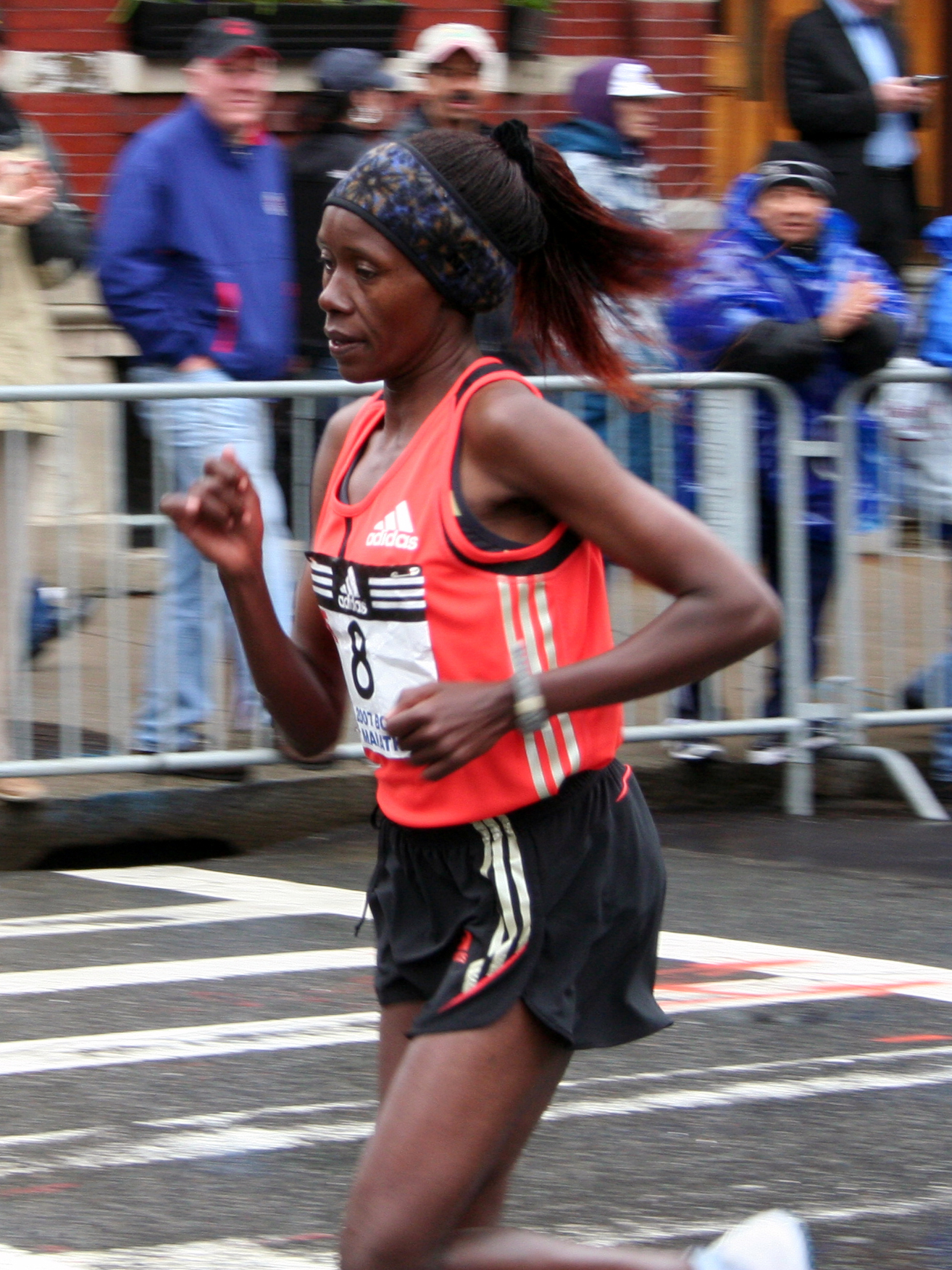
Alice Chelangat at the 2007 Boston Marathon

Alice Kimetto Chelangat (born 27 December 1976 in Kericho) is a Kenyan long-distance runner who specializes in the marathon race.

== Biography ==
She represented her country in the event at the 2004 Olympic Games. She also competes in cross country running and won the team silver medal with Kenya at the 2006 IAAF World Cross Country Championships.

She is a two-time winner of the Rock 'n' Roll San Diego Marathon and has won the Milan Marathon and Florence Marathon in Italy. Her personal best for the marathon distance is 2:26:36 hours, set in 2001.

== Championship record ==
Year	Competition	Venue	Position	Notes
2004	Olympic Games	Athens, Greece	11th	Marathon
2006	World Cross Country Championships	Fukuoka, Japan	10th	Long race
2006	World Cross Country Championships	Fukuoka, Japan	2nd	Team competition

== Road races ==
Year	Competition	Venue	Position	Notes
2001	Milan Marathon	Milan, Italy	1st	Marathon
2001	Enschede Marathon	Enschede, Netherlands	3rd	Marathon
2002	Rock 'n' Roll San Diego Marathon	San Diego, California, U.S.	1st	Marathon
2002	Milan Marathon	Milan, Italy	2nd	Marathon
2003	Prague Marathon	Prague, Czech Republic	2nd	Marathon
2003	Nairobi Marathon	Nairobi, Kenya	1st	Marathon
2004	Hamburg Marathon	Hamburg, Germany	2nd	Marathon
2005	Florence Marathon	Florence, Italy	1st	Marathon
2006	Rock 'n' Roll San Diego Marathon	San Diego, California, U.S.	1st	Marathon
2006	Rock 'n' Roll Virginia Beach Half Marathon	Virginia Beach, VA, U.S.	2nd	Half Marathon
2007	Boston Marathon	Boston, U.S.	8th	Marathon
2008	Rotterdam Marathon	Rotterdam, the Netherlands	4th	Marathon
2009	Nairobi Marathon	Nairobi, Kenya	2nd	Marathon

== Personal bests ==
- 10,000 metres - 32:49.6 min (2001)
- Half marathon - 1:09:10 hrs (2002)
- Marathon - 2:26:36 hrs (2001)
