= Turin Marathon =

Coordinates: 45°04′19″N 7°41′08″E

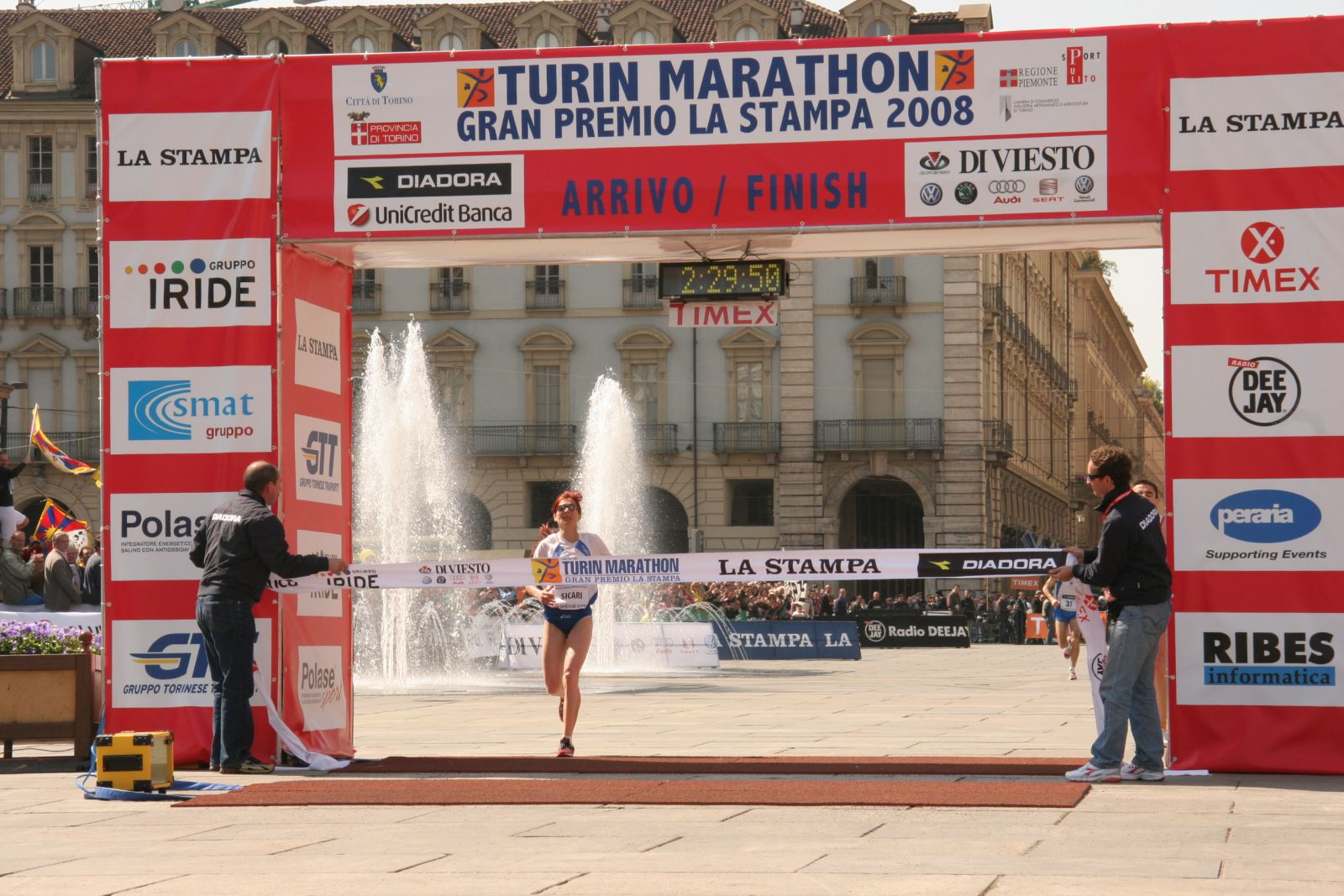
- 2008 Turin Marathon
- Date: Mid-November
- Location: Turin, Italy
- Event type: Road
- Distance: Marathon
- Established: 1987
- Website: Team Marathon

The Turin Marathon (Italian: Maratona di Torino Gran Premio La Stampa) is an annual marathon race which takes place in Turin, Italy in November.

== History ==
The first edition of the modern race was held in 1987, although other marathon competitions have been held in the city prior to this, including sporadic races in the 1970s and early 1980s, and the earliest known instance of a race in 1897. The competition has been broadcast live on television by Italy's state broadcaster RAI.

The marathon race is divided into two sections: the competitive race and the non-competitive race. Prizes are available for the best performers in the competitive events for both men and women. All participants in this competition must be registered with the Italian athletics federation (Federazione Italiana di Atletica Leggera). This race attracts a number of international, professional runners each year, with Kenyans and Ethiopian athletes comprising the main competition against the national-level Italian athletes.

The non-competitive race is a fun run which is open to the public, although runners must attend a compulsory medical before taking part. The race day also includes two further competitions; the Stratorino (a 6 km fun run and walk in the city) and the junior marathon (a 1 km race for children) are available to the public and proceeds go to charity. Over 2500 runners took part in the marathon in 2010. Some 7000 people took part in the Stratorino in 2010, while the junior kilometre race attracted a field of 12,000 fun runners.

The course of the marathon race begins in Piazza Castello in the centre of Turin. The oval, looped circuit of 42.195 km heads out of the city and passes a number of surrounding villages in the area in the following order: Moncalieri, Nichelino, Beinasco, Orbassano, Rivalta, Rivoli and Collegno. After reaching Collegno, the course heads eastwards back towards Piazza Castello in Turin, which is the finishing point for the race. The current course records for the competition are 2:07:45 for men (set by Simretu Alemayehu in 2001) and 2:26:22 for women (set by Agnes Kiprop in 2009).

The competition was previously held in April but it changed to its current mid-November timing for the 2010 edition. In earlier editions, the course was held elsewhere in the Province of Turin, tracing a path from Susa to Avigliana. It was known as the Susavigliana Marathon during this period between 1987 and 1990.

Precursors to the modern competition include the Turin International Marathon, which was held annually from 1919 to 1933. The marathon event for the inaugural 1934 European Athletics Championships was held the following year. The city also hosts the annual Turin Half Marathon, which is organised by the same group as the full marathon and takes place in September.

== Past winners ==
Key: Course record Italian championship race Short course

Edition	Year	Men's winner	Time (h:m:s)	Women's winner	Time (h:m:s)
I	1987	Luigi Chiampo (ITA)	2:17:00	Maria Curatolo (ITA)	2:45:54
II	1988	Franco Borelli (ITA) Giampaolo Messina (ITA)	2:17:12	Silvana Cucchietti (ITA)	2:48:25
III	1989	Joseph Kipsang (KEN)	2:30:32	Cinzia Allasia (ITA)	3:07:21
IV	1990	Gianni Truschi (ITA)	2:13:17	Cinzia Allasia (ITA)	2:52:28
V	1991	Walter Durbano (ITA)	2:10:03	Alla Doudaeva (BLR)	2:39:41
VI	1992	Alessio Faustini (ITA)	2:11:03	Irina Sklyarenko (UKR)	2:37:39
VII	1993	Walter Durbano (ITA)	2:11:13	Emma Scaunich (ITA)	2:34:17
VIII	1994	Michael Kipkai (KEN)	2:10:08	Laura Fogli (ITA)	2:31:45
IX	1995	Sid-Ali Sakhri (ALG)	2:11:35	Rosanna Munerotto (ITA)	2:29:31
X	1996	Abel Gisemba (KEN)	2:11:41	Franca Fiacconi (ITA)	2:29:18
XI	1997	Joseph Chebet (KEN)	2:08:23	Jane Salumäe (EST)	2:27:04
XII	1998	Japhet Kosgei (KEN)	2:09:59	Franca Fiacconi (ITA)	2:30:21
XIII	1999	Sammy Korir (KEN)	2:08:27	Maria Guida (ITA)	2:28:28
XIV	2000	Simretu Alemayehu (ETH)	2:08:33	Florence Barsosio (KEN)	2:27:58
XV	2001	Simretu Alemayehu (ETH)	2:07:45	Tiziana Alagia (ITA)	2:27:54
XVI	2002	Alberico Di Cecco (ITA)	2:10:27	Anastasia Ndereba (KEN)	2:29:25
XVII	2003	Daniele Caimmi (ITA)	2:10:08	Stine Larsen (NOR)	2:27:20
XVIII	2004	Frederick Cherono (KEN)	2:08:38	Helena Javornik (SLO)	2:31:13
XIX	2005	Danilo Goffi (ITA)	2:11:13	Beatrice Omwanza (KEN)	2:30:41
XX	2006	Stephen Kibiwott (KEN)	2:10:10	Jane Ekimat (KEN)	2:32:18
XXI	2007	Philemon Kirwa (KEN)	2:10:24	Anikó Kálovics (HUN)	2:29:24
XXII	2008	Stephen Kibiwott (KEN)	2:10:13	Vincenza Sicari (ITA)	2:29:51
XXIII	2009	Benson Barus (KEN)	2:09:07	Agnes Kiprop (KEN)	2:26:22
XXIV	2010	Ruggero Pertile (ITA)	2:10:58	Priscah Jeptoo (KEN)	2:27:02
XXV	2011	Ennaji El Idrissi (MAR)	2:08:13	Yuliya Ruban (UKR)	2:27:10
XXVI	2012	Patrick Terer (KEN)	2:10:34	Sharon Cherop (KEN)	2:23:57
XXVII	2013	Patrick Terer (KEN)	2:08:52	Ivana Iozzia (ITA)	2:34:52
XXVIII	2014	Samuel Rutto (KEN)	2:10:00	Esther Ndiema (KEN)	2:28:41
XXIX	2015	Alex Saekwo (KEN)	2:15:29	Silvia Weissteiner (ITA)	2:32:35
XXX	2016	Youssef Sbaai (MAR)	2:13:43	Laila Soufyane (ITA)	2:36:32
XXXI	2017	Alessandro Giacobazzi (ITA)	2:15:25	Patrycja Włodarczyk (POL)	2:53:27
