= Salt Lake City Marathon =

Annual race in the United States held since 2004

- Date: April
- Location: Salt Lake City, Millcreek, and Holladay, Utah, U.S.
- Event type: Road
- Distance: Marathon
- Established: 2004 (22 years ago)
- Course records: M: 2:15:14; F: 2:30:08
- Website: Official website
- Participants: 666 finishers (2019); ~9,000 (all races) (2009)

The Salt Lake City Marathon is an annual marathon foot-race run in Salt Lake City, Millcreek and Holladay, Utah. It was first held in 2004.

The race begins at the Olympic Legacy Bridge at the University of Utah, runs through the center of Salt Lake City, and ends at Library Square. A bike tour held on the same day uses the same course, but starts earlier in the morning. A half marathon also starts with the marathon.

== History ==
The marathon was first organized in 2004 by Devine Racing, a Chicago-based race organization company.

In 2005, a bike tour was added. In 2006, a half-marathon was added, and the date of the race was moved from April to June. In 2007, the date was moved back to April.

Prior to the 2009 event, reports surfaced that the winners from the 2008 race had not been paid their prize winnings. Devine Racing reportedly made those payments prior to the 2009 race commencing.

In February 2012, the Salt Lake City Marathon was purchased from Devine by US Road Sports & Entertainment Group. The 2012 event saw "no major flaws" and plentiful water, toilets, and medical aid stations. The marathon was sold in 2014 to Lifetime Fitness and sold again in 2015 to High Altitude Events.

The 2020 in-person edition of the race was first postponed to 2021 due to the coronavirus pandemic, before being cancelled altogether. Registrants were first given the option of running the race virtually in 2020 or transferring their entry to 2021, before those that chose the latter option were then given the option of running the race virtually in 2021 or transferring their entry to 2022.

== Course ==
External image
- Course map of full and half in 2019

The course begins near the foothills of the city at the Olympic Legacy Bridge at the University of Utah in Salt Lake City. The marathon takes runners through the heart of Salt Lake City and the northern part of the Salt Lake Valley offering beautiful views of the local foothills and surrounding Wasatch mountains.

Starting at an elevation of just over 4,800 feet, the course winds its way from the foothills to the lower elevations with the half marathon course offering mostly flat, downhill running.

The half marathon and the full marathon are run simultaneously and share a common start line on the Olympic Legacy Bridge as the event begins.

The course will often follow the base of the Wasatch mountains into neighborhoods of neighboring Millcreek and Holladay as it winds through local Salt Lake streets and by nearby neighborhoods and local businesses towards major boulevards near the finish line in downtown Salt Lake City.

A bike tour follows the entire length of the marathon course and has a time limit of 1 hour and 45 minutes.

== Winners ==
Key: Course record (in bold)

Ed.	Year	Male Winner	Country	Time	Female Winner	Country	Time	Rf.
1	2004	Gabriel Muchiri	Kenya	2:17:21	Lyudmila Korchagina	Russia	2:30:41	
2	2005	Araya Haregot	Ethiopia	**2:15:14**	Dorota Gruca	Poland	**2:30:08**	
3	2006	Joseph Nguran	Kenya	2:16:41	Ilona Baranova	Ukraine	2:38:04	
4	2007	Nelson Lebo	Kenya	2:21:17	Maria Portilla	Peru	2:40:47	
5	2008	Genna Tufa	Ethiopia	2:23:10	Maria Portilla	Peru	2:40:26	
6	2009	Joseph Mutinda	Kenya	2:16:38	Nadezda Tuptova	Russia	2:47:49	
7	2010	Fritz Van de Kamp	United States	2:30:30	Nikki Kimball	United States	3:15:36	
8	2011	Jonathan Ndambuki	Kenya	2:25:56	Keri Cannon	United States	3:09:07	
9	2012	Fritz Van de Kamp	United States	2:25:58	Devra Vierkant	United States	2:54:56	
10	2013	Bryant Jensen	United States	2:30:14	Becky Sondag	United States	3:06:32	
11	2014	Fritz Van de Kamp	United States	2:28:18	Melanie Burnham	United States	3:02:46	
12	2015	Mike Nelson	United States	2:33:41	Nicole Lyons	United States	2:58:38	
13	2016	Bryant Jensen	United States	2:32:41	Natalie Como	United States	3:00:21	
14	2017	Clinton Rhoton	United States	2:35:13	Kristen Olsen	United States	2:55:54	
15	2018	Travis Fuller	United States	2:27:54	Jen Rock	United States	2:50:24	
16	2019	Chad Crockford	United States	2:38:17	Janel Zick	United States	2:56:38	
	2020	postponed due to coronavirus pandemic						
	2021	cancelled due to coronavirus pandemic						
17	2022	Thomas George	United States	2:29:22	Brooke Croxall	United States	3:04:43	
18	2023	Kevin Lynch	United States	2:21:41	Kristin Johnson	United States	3:07:18	
19	2024	Alex Johnson	United States	2:32:18	Sarah Newton	United States	3:02:47	
20	2025	James Wenzel	United States	2:30:57	Keelah Barge	United States	2:44:16	
21	2026	Spencer Kohler	United States	2:30:40	Rebekah Battaglia	United States	2:52:01	
