= Florence Marathon =

Annual race in Italy held since 1984

Coordinates: 43°46′08″N 11°15′40″E

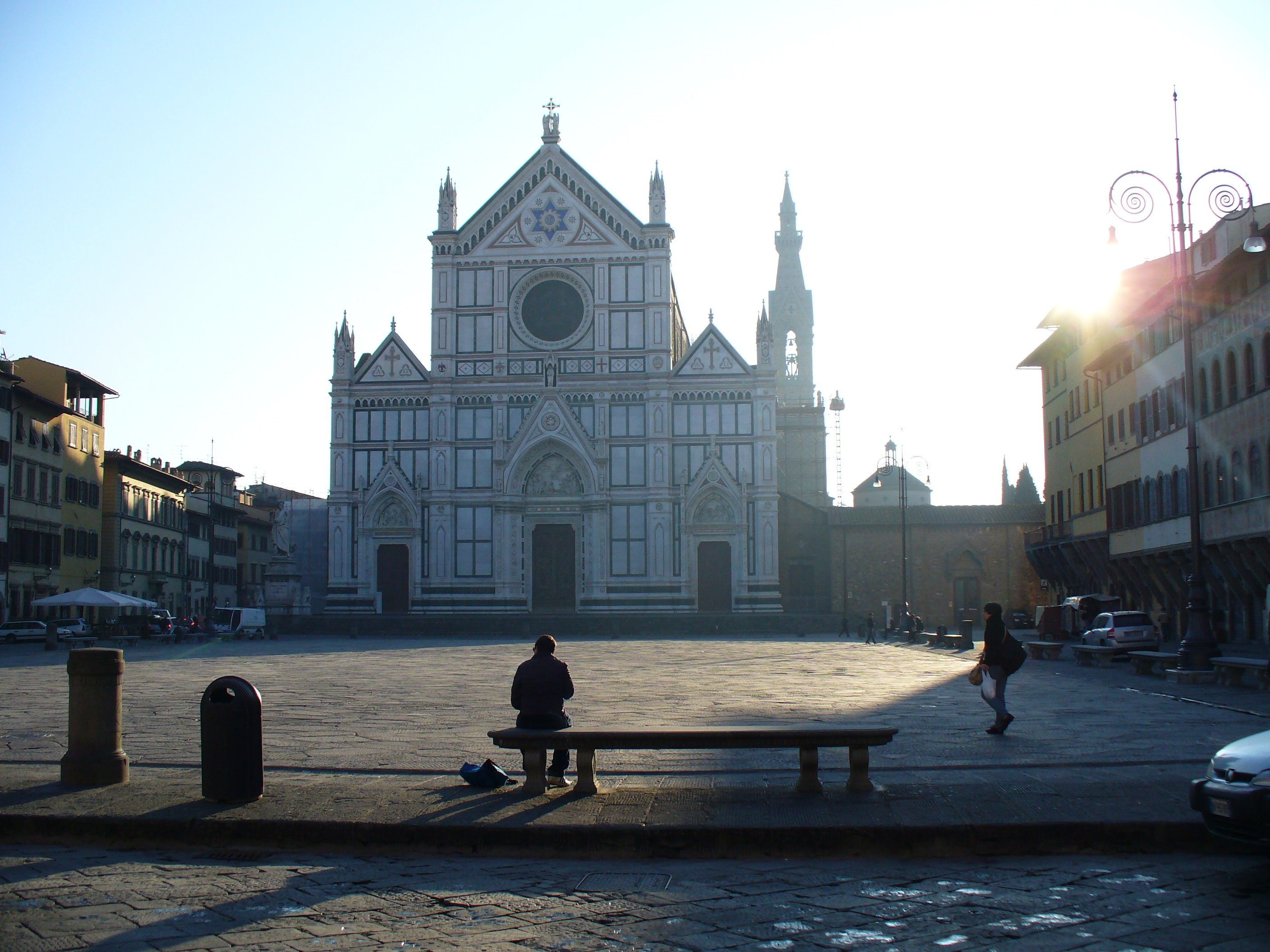
- Florence's architecture features prominently – Piazza Santa Croce is the finishing point
- Date: Late November
- Location: Florence, Italy
- Event type: Road
- Distance: Marathon
- Primary sponsor: Asics
- Established: 1984 (42 years ago)
- Course records: Men: 2:08:41 (2006) (Kenya) James Kutto; Women: 2:24:17 (2018) (Israel) Lonah Salpeter
- Website: Florence Marathon
- Participants: 3,751 finishers (2021); 5,792 (2019); 7,606 (2018)

The Florence Marathon (Italian: Maratona di Firenze) is an annual full-length marathon race held in late November in Florence, Italy, since 1984.

== History ==
Established in 1984, the international competition has significantly grown in size since its inaugural edition of 462 runners – a total of 10,211 runners started the 2010 edition, making it the second largest Italian marathon after the Rome City Marathon.

Orlando Pizzolato, a two-time New York Marathon winner, was present to inaugurate the race in 1984. The competition's first course was about a kilometre short of the true marathon distance, and it was increased for all subsequent editions.

Italians form the bulk of the runners, while France, Germany and the United Kingdom are usually the next most represented nationalities in the field. From 2005 to 2009, the competition was annually broadcast live for three hours on the state-owned Rai Tre channel. The race is among Italy's most prominent – it was selected to be the national championship marathon race for the first time in 2003.

The 2020 edition of the race was cancelled due to the coronavirus pandemic, with all registrants given the option of registering for 2021, 2022, or 2023 for free.

== Course ==
=== Initial course ===
The course used in the inaugural race was about 965 m (3,166 ft) short.

=== From 2001 to 2009 ===
From 2001 through 2009, the course began at Piazzale Michelangelo and had a zigzagging path through the centre. The bends and cobblestone roads made for a particularly difficult marathon and this led to the change in 2011 for an easier, faster race.

An AIMS-certified course, it was ineligible for world records due to an overall net drop of 75 m from 2001 to 2009, but the current course is now eligible.

=== From 2010 to 2011 ===
The course used in 2010 and 2011 had a drop of 40 m (130 ft), which meant that it was eligible for records as it was within the drop limit of 1 m/km (5.3 ft/mi).

=== Current course ===
The course, which was first used in 2012, starts at the Lungarno Pecori Giraldi and finishes in Piazza Santa Croce. It passes through much of Florence's historical town centre, with architecture dating from the 13th century, including: Piazza della Signoria, Ponte Vecchio, and the Basilica of Santa Croce.

== Winners ==
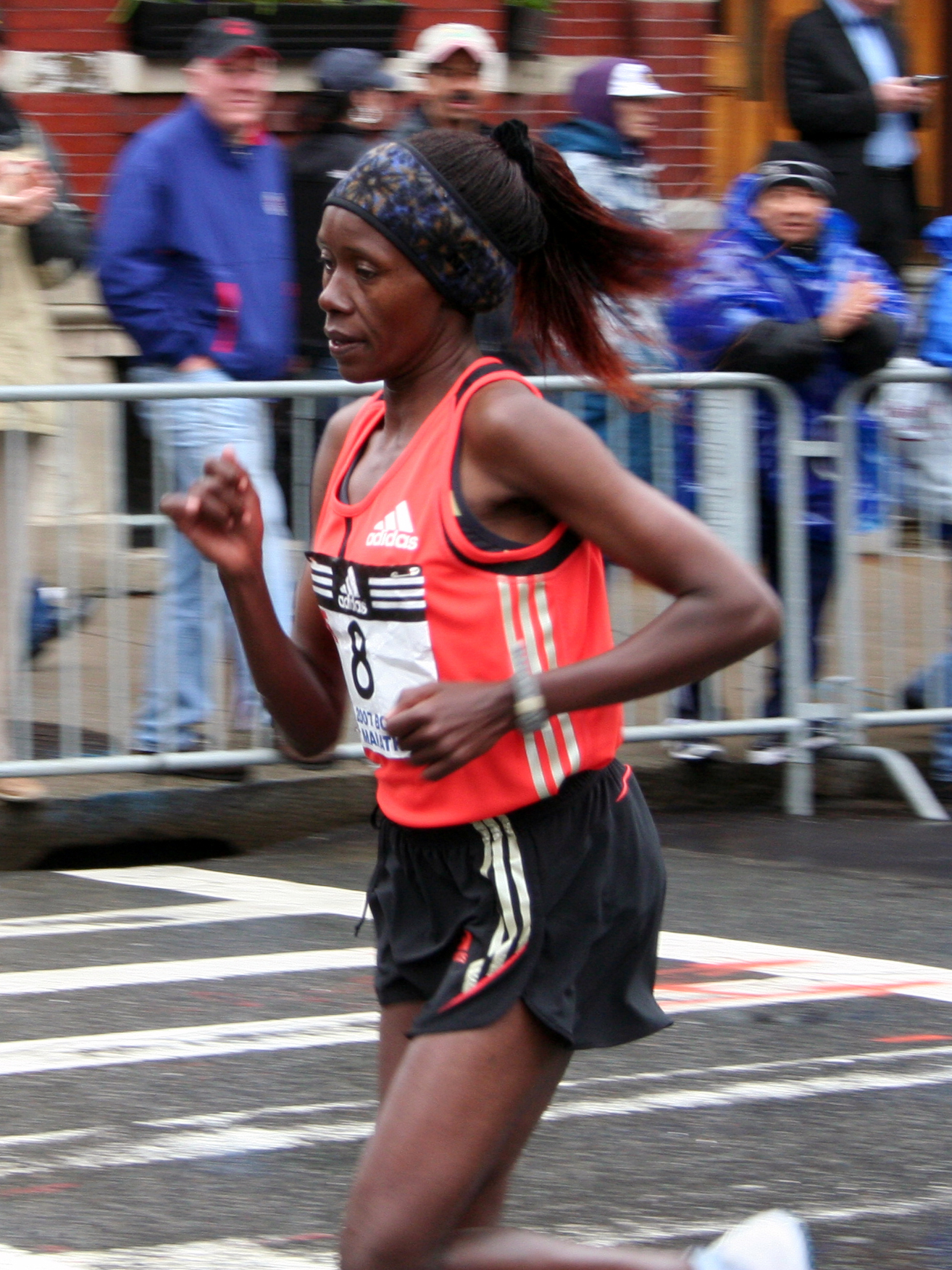
Kenyan runner Alice Chelangat won the women's race in 2005.

The current course record holders are James Kutto, who set the men's record of 2:08:41 in 2006, and Lonah Chemtai Salpeter who set the female course record of 2:24:17 in 2018.

Key:

Course record (in bold)
Country's championship race
Short course

| Edition | Year | Men's winner | Time | Women's winner | Time | Rf. |
|---|---|---|---|---|---|---|
| I | 1984 | Andrew Robertson (GBR) | 2:15:23 | Gillian Burley (GBR) | 2:32:53 | |
| II | 1985 | Fausto Molinari (ITA) | 2:17:44 | Celia Duncan (GBR) | 2:44:32 | |
| III | 1986 | Andrew Girling (GBR) | 2:15:37 | Graziella Striuli (ITA) | 2:39:35 | |
| IV | 1987 | Trevor Fieldsend (GBR) | 2:16:33 | Carolyn Naisby (GBR) | 2:33:23 | |
| V | 1988 | Edgardo Farinelli (ITA) | 2:15:51 | Manola Casalini (ITA) | 2:43:14 | |
| VI | 1989 | Alberto Lucherini (ITA) | 2:16:48 | Christine Van Put (BEL) | 2:39:45 | |
| VII | 1990 | Roman Kejžar (YUG) | 2:18:57 | Valentina Bottarelli (ITA) | 2:44:23 | |
| VIII | 1991 | Alberto Lucherini (ITA) | 2:16:33 | Sheila Catford (GBR) | 2:35:37 | |
| IX | 1992 | Ivo Rodrigues (BRA) | 2:19:12 | Ingrid Ekroll (NOR) | 2:50:34 | |
| X | 1993 | Ivano Marcon (ITA) | 2:16:39 | Éva Petrik (HUN) | 2:42:24 | |
| XI | 1994 | Clair Wathier (BRA) | 2:14:03 | Dana Hajná (CZE) | 2:41:34 | |
| XII | 1995 | Bernard Boiyo (KEN) | 2:15:36 | Svetlana Netchaeva (RUS) | 2:40:08 | |
| XIII | 1996 | Sammy Korir (KEN) | 2:15:04 | Bettina Sabatini (ITA) | 2:33:51 | |
| XIV | 1997 | Ottaviano Andriani (ITA) | 2:14:27 | Matilde Ravizza (ITA) | 2:47:00 | |
| XV | 1998 | Azzedine Sakhri (ALG) | 2:16:39 | Ida Kovács (HUN) | 2:44:16 | |
| XVI | 1999 | Michele Gamba (ITA) | 2:11:51 | Michaela McCallum (GBR) | 2:38:28 | |
| XVII | 2000 | Angelo Carosi (ITA) | 2:14:11 | Tiziana Alagia (ITA) | 2:32:18 | |
| XVIII | 2001 | Daniel Kirwa (KEN) | 2:10:38 | Florinda Andreucci (ITA) | 2:32:26 | |
| XIX | 2002 | Michael Kapkiai (KEN) | 2:11:15 | Helena Javornik (SLO) | 2:28:15 | |
| XX | 2003 | Angelo Carosi (ITA) | 2:15:54 | Anna Incerti (ITA) | 2:34:40 | |
| XXI | 2004 | Benjamin Kiprotich (KEN) | 2:11:34 | Florence Barsosio (KEN) | 2:29:11 | |
| XXII | 2005 | Samson Kosgei (KEN) | 2:11:27 | Alice Chelangat (KEN) | 2:30:46 | |
| XXIII | 2006 | James Kutto (KEN) | **2:08:41** | Vincenza Sicari (ITA) | 2:34:52 | |
| XXIV | 2007 | Paul Ngeny (KEN) | 2:12:50 | Vincenza Sicari (ITA) | 2:33:14 | |
| XXV | 2008 | Jackson Kiprono (KEN) | 2:12:37 | Giovanna Volpato (ITA) | 2:34:13 | |
| XXVI | 2009 | Ben Chebet (KEN) | 2:11:21 | Eva-Maria Gradwohl (AUT) | 2:35:41 | |
| XXVII | 2010 | Tadese Tolesa (ETH) | 2:12:41 | Firehiwot Dado (ETH) | 2:28:58 | |
| XXVIII | 2011 | Birhanu Bekele (ETH) | 2:09:52 | Asha Gigi (ETH) | 2:31:36 | |
| XXIX | 2012 | Endeshaw Negesse (ETH) | 2:09:59 | Shuru Diriba (ETH) | 2:30:08 | |
| XXX | 2013 | Oleksandr Sitkovskyy (UKR) | 2:09:14 | Abeba Teklu (ETH) | 2:30:37 | |
| XXXI | 2014 | Asbel Kipsang (KEN) | 2:09:55 | Bizuayehu Ehite (ETH) | 2:31:28 | |
| XXXII | 2015 | Tujuba Megersa (ETH) | 2:09:55 | Priscah Cherono (KEN) | 2:31:34 | |
| XXXIII | 2016 | Yadete Teshome (ETH) | 2:11:57 | Winnie Jepkorir (KEN) | 2:28:46 | |
| XXXIV | 2017 | Zelalem Bacha (BHR) | 2:14:41 | Dire Tune (ETH) | 2:28:55 | |
| XXXV | 2018 | Abdi Ali Gelelchu (BHR) | 2:11:32 | Lonah Salpeter (ISR) | **2:24:17** | |
| XXXVI | 2019 | Sahlessilae Bekele (ETH) | 2:10:14 | Jess Piasecki (GBR) | 2:25:29 | |
| — | 2020 | cancelled due to coronavirus pandemic | | | | |
| XXXVII | 2021 | Cybrian Kotut (KEN) | 2:08:59 | Tsehay Maru (ETH) | 2:27:17 | |

=== By country ===
| Country | Men's race | Women's race | Total |
|---|---|---|---|
| Italy | 9 | 11 | 20 |
| Kenya | 12 | 4 | 16 |
| Ethiopia | 6 | 7 | 13 |
| England | 2 | 4 | 6 |
| Brazil | 2 | 0 | 2 |
| Hungary | 0 | 2 | 2 |
| Scotland | 1 | 1 | 2 |
| Slovenia | 1 | 1 | 2 |
| Algeria | 1 | 0 | 1 |
| Austria | 1 | 0 | 1 |
| Bahrain | 2 | 0 | 2 |
| Belgium | 0 | 1 | 1 |
| Czech Republic | 0 | 1 | 1 |
| United Kingdom | 0 | 1 | 1 |
| Israel | 0 | 1 | 1 |
| Norway | 0 | 1 | 1 |
| Russia | 0 | 1 | 1 |
| Ukraine | 1 | 0 | 1 |

== Participation ==
Number of race finishers
| Year | Men | Women | Total |
|---|---|---|---|
| 2013 | 7839 | 1451 | 9290 |
| 2012 | 6577 | 1194 | 7771 |
| 2011 | 5924 | 1004 | 6928 |
| 2010 | 6611 | 1179 | 7790 |
| 2009 | 7025 | 1182 | 8207 |
| 2008 | 6181 | 1022 | 7203 |
| 2007 | 5356 | 931 | 6287 |
| 2006 | 5289 | 981 | 6270 |
| 2005 | 4201 | 679 | 4880 |
| 2004 | 3486 | 520 | 4006 |
| 2003 | 3428 | 561 | 3989 |
| 2002 | 2851 | 404 | 3255 |
| 2001 | 2351 | 291 | 2642 |
| 2000 | 2242 | 239 | 2481 |
| 1999 | 2055 | 186 | 2241 |
| 1998 | 2116 | 161 | 2277 |
| 1997 | 2170 | 194 | 2364 |
| 1996 | 2292 | 181 | 2473 |
| 1995 | 2166 | 145 | 2311 |
| 1994 | 1955 | 129 | 2084 |
| 1993 | 1470 | 78 | 1548 |
| 1992 | 1233 | 52 | 1285 |
| 1991 | 1022 | 45 | 1067 |
| 1990 | 1018 | 39 | 1057 |
| 1989 | 1127 | 43 | 1170 |
| 1988 | 1119 | 38 | 1157 |
| 1987 | 1247 | 50 | 1297 |
| 1986 | 1180 | 45 | 1225 |
| 1985 | 822 | 37 | 859 |
| 1984 | 448 | 14 | 462 |

- All statistics taken from the Association of Road Racing Statisticians.
