= Italian Marathon =

Annual running marathon in Italy

- Date: Early November
- Location: Maranello–Carpi
- Event type: Road
- Distance: Marathon
- Established: 1988
- Course records: Men: 2:08:36 (2011) (Kenya) Nicolas Kurgat; Women: 2:25:57 (1999) (Italy) Maria Guida
- Website: Italian Marathon
- Participants: 413 (2016); 529 (2015)

The Italian Marathon memorial Enzo Ferrari (Italian name: Maratona d’Italia memorial Enzo Ferrari) is an annual marathon race in the Province of Modena, Italy which begins in Maranello and finishes in Carpi. Its inaugural event was held in 1988. The event takes place in October and features both a male and female competition.

== History ==
The competition can be traced back further as editions of the Carpi Marathon were held in 1962, 1969, 1970 and 1985, but these were under the auspices of a separate athletics group and are not considered to be part of the current race's history.

The race's current route from Maranello to Carpi began in 1999, the same year that the competition began its sponsorship arrangement with Ferrari and became known as the Memorial Enzo Ferrari, in honour of the company's founder. Since 2001, a roller skating marathon has also been contested at the same time as the traditional road running marathon.

The race has doubled up as the national Italian marathon championships on a number of occasions. The 2008 edition of the race was dedicated to the centennial anniversary of Dorando Pietri's achievement at the 1908 Summer Olympics in the marathon race. Hungarian runner Anikó Kálovics is the only athlete to have won the race on two occasions.

== Past winners ==
Key: Course record Italian championship race

Edition	Year	Men's winner	Time (h:m:s)	Women's winner	Time (h:m:s)
I	1988	Mirko Vindiš (YUG)	2:16:28	Rita Marchisio (ITA)	2:31:08
II	1989	Csaba Szűcs (HUN)	2:15:43.5	Anna Villani (ITA)	2:35:05.1
III	1990	Severino Bernardini (ITA)	2:11:54	Emma Scaunich (ITA)	2:32:47
IV	1991	Diamantino dos Santos (BRA)	2:11:28	Irina Bogacheva (KGZ)	2:28:57
V	1992	Grzegorz Gajdus (POL)	2:12:36	Rosanna Munerotto (ITA)	2:29:34
VI	1993	Graziano Calvaresi (ITA)	2:11:49	Marjan Freriks (NED)	2:39:53
VII	1994	Roberto Crosio (ITA)	2:12:04	Simona Viola (ITA)	2:36:07
VIII	1995	Clair Wathier (BRA)	2:15:48	Jane Salumäe (EST)	2:32:22
IX	1996	Fabián Roncero (ESP)	2:09:43	Franca Fiacconi (ITA)	2:28:22
X	1997	Massimilano Ingrami (ITA)	2:12:16	Ornella Ferrara (ITA)	2:28:43
XI	1998	Vincent Kipkemboi (KEN)	2:13:12	Maura Viceconte (ITA)	2:31:23
XII	1999	Stephen Rugut (KEN)	2:10:44	Maria Guida (ITA)	2:25:57
XIII	2000	Gideon Chirchir (KEN)	2:12:51	Jackline Cherotich (KEN)	2:28:32
XIV	2001	Joseph Maqala (RSA)	2:12:04	Patrizia Ritondo (ITA)	2:33:38
XV	2002	Daniel Kirwa (KEN)	2:09:58.1	Tiziana Alagia (ITA)	2:30:2
XVI	2003	Philemon Rotich (KEN)	2:12:13	Jennifer Chesinon (KEN)	2:31:39
XVII	2004	Harun Toroitich (KEN)	2:09:09	Anne Chelegat (KEN)	2:30:54
XVIII	2005	Stephen Biwott (KEN)	2:11:16	Romina Sedoni (ITA)	2:36:45
XIX	2006	David Kemboi (KEN)	2:10:07.2	Anikó Kálovics (HUN)	2:26:43.2
XX	2007	Noah Serem (KEN)	2:11:18	Anikó Kálovics (HUN)	2:28:17
XXI	2008	Benjamin Chebet (KEN)	2:10:50	Rosaria Console (ITA)	2:30:44
XXII	2009	Vasyl Matvichuk (UKR)	2:11:44	Anne Bererwe (KEN)	2:32:02
XXIII	2010	Paul Kosgei (KEN)	2:09:00	Hellen Mugo (KEN)	2:27:16
XXIV	2011	Nicolas Kurgat (KEN)	2:08:36	Deribe Godana (ETH)	2:32:22
XXV	2012	Sisay Lemma (ETH)	2:11:58	Ivana Iozzia (ITA)	2:35:08
XXVI	2013	Jilali Jamali (MAR)	2:25:00	Silvia Savorana (ITA)	2:51:27
XXVII	2014	Pietro Cabassi (ITA)	2:41:06	Paola Dal Mas (ITA)	2:48:30
XXVIII	2015	Giuseppe Mucerino (ITA)	2:33:03	Elga Caccialanza (ITA)	2:50:39
XXIX	2016	Abderrafii Roqti (MAR)	2:24:00	Patrizia Donato (ITA)	3:07:18
—	2017	Not held			
—	2018	Not held			
—	2019	Not held			

=== By country ===
Country	Men's race	Women's race	Total
Italy	6	18	24
Kenya	12	5	17
Hungary	1	2	3
Ethiopia	1	1	2
Brazil	2	0	2
Morocco	2	0	2
Poland	1	0	1
Spain	1	0	1
South Africa	1	0	1
Ukraine	1	0	1
Kyrgyzstan	0	1	1
Netherlands	0	1	1
Estonia	0	1	1

== Other editions ==
Key: Italian championship race

Year	Men's winner	Time	Women's winner	Time
1962	Salvatore Cuccuru (ITA)	2:46:59	—	—
1969	Antonio Ambu (ITA)	2:23:09	—	—
1970	Francesco Amante (ITA)	2:23:02	—	—
1985	Osvaldo Faustini (ITA)	2:14:10	Lucia Bertelli (ITA)	2:48:29
1988	Mirko Vindis (SLO)	2:16:28	Rita Marchisio (ITA)	2:31:08
