= Franca Fiacconi =

Italian marathon runner

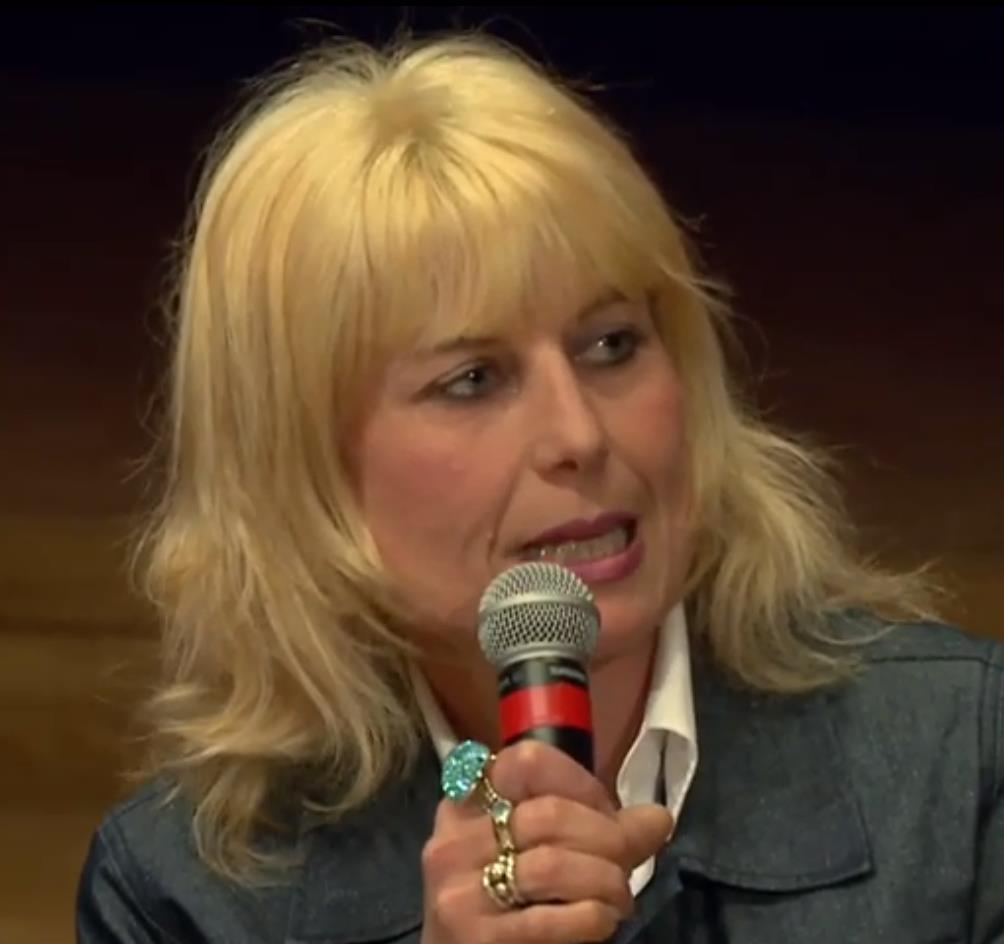
- Fiacconi in 2012.

Personal information
- Nationality: Italian
- Born: October 4, 1965 (age 60) Rome, Italy
- Height: 1.73 m (5 ft 8 in)
- Weight: 56 kg (123 lb)

Sport
- Country: Italy
- Sport: Athletics
- Event: Marathon

Achievements and titles
- Personal best: Marathon: 2:25.17 (1998)
Medal record
Universiade
Silver medal – second place	1993 Buffalo	Marathon
European Marathon Cup
Silver medal – second place	1998 Budapest	Team event
International Marathons
Event	1st	2nd	3rd
New York Marathon	1	2	1
Italian Marathon	1	0	0
Osaka Marathon	0	1	0
Rome Marathon	1	0	0
Turin Marathon	1	0	0
Total	4	3	1

Franca Fiacconi (born 4 October 1965 in Rome) is a marathon runner from Italy.

== Biography ==
Fiacconi won the 1998 New York City Marathon, after finishing second in 1996 and third in 1997. She also won the 2001 Enschede Marathon. She placed fourth in the women's marathon at the 1998 European Championships and won the silver medal at the 1993 Summer Universiade.

Fiacconi won the Turin Marathon in 1996 and 1998, also taking the Italian national title in the latter edition.

== Achievements ==
- All results regarding marathon, unless stated otherwise

Year	Competition	Venue	Position	Notes
1993	World Student Games	Buffalo, United States	2nd	2:38:44
1994	Penang Bridge International Marathon	Penang, Malaysia	1st	2:56:49
1996	Italian Marathon	Carpi, Italy	1st	2:28:22
1997	World Championships	Athens, Greece	13th	2:39:53
1998	Rome City Marathon	Rome, Italy	1st	2:28:12
1998	European Championships	Budapest, Hungary	4th	2:28:59
1998	New York City Marathon	New York, United States	1st	2:25:17
1999	Prague Marathon	Prague, Czech Republic	1st	2:28:33
2001	Osaka International Ladies Marathon	Osaka, Japan	2nd	2:26:49
2001	Enschede Marathon	Enschede, Netherlands	1st	2:31:40

== Personal bests ==
- 10,000 metres - 36:02.5 - Roma - 10/04/1993
- Half marathon - 1:12:37 - Uster - 27/09/1998
- 30 kilometres - 1:44:08 - Osaka - 28/01/2001
- Marathon - 2:25:17 - New York City - 01/11/1998

== See also ==
- Italian all-time lists - Marathon
