= Rosaria Console =

Italian long-distance runner

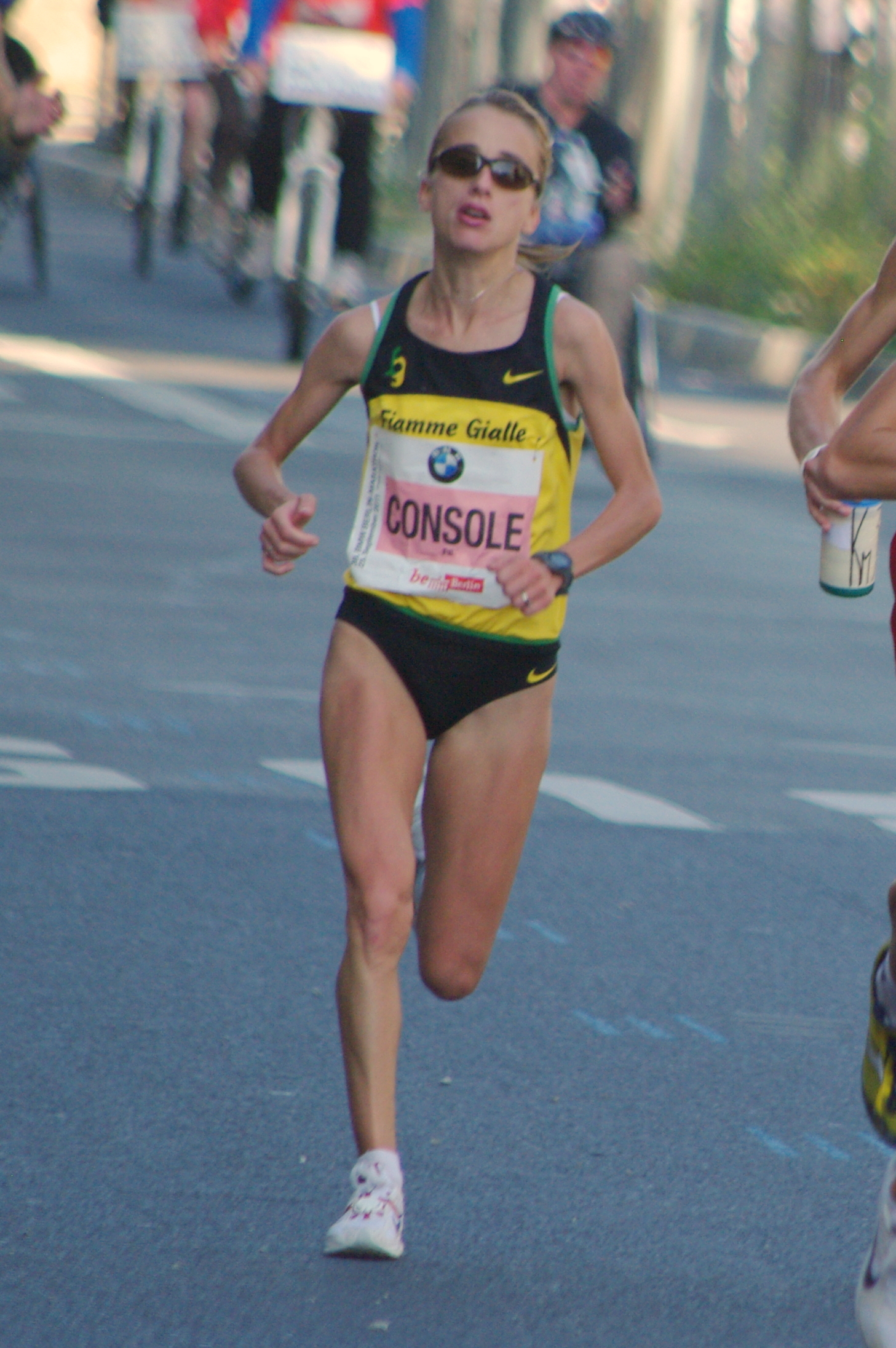
- Rosaria Console at the 2011 Berlin Marathon

Personal information
- Nationality: Italian
- Born: 17 December 1979 (age 46) Martina Franca, Italy
- Height: 1.60 m (5 ft 3 in)
- Weight: 42 kg (93 lb)

Sport
- Country: Italy
- Sport: Athletics
- Event: Long distance running
- Club: G.S. Fiamme Gialle
- Coached by: Luciano Gigliotti

Achievements and titles
- Personal bests: 3000 m: 9:15.80 (2000); 5000 m: 15:49.50 (1999); 10,000 m: 32:55.42 (2000); Half marathon: 1:09:34 (2005); Marathon: 2:26:45 (2009)
Medal record
Senior level (individual)
Event	1st	2nd	3rd
Universiade	1	0	0
Mediterranean Games	0	2	0
European 10,000m Cup	0	1	0
Total	1	3	0
Youth level (individual)
Event	1st	2nd	3rd
European U23 Championships	0	1	0
European Championships
Silver medal – second place	2016 Amsterdam	Half marathon team
International Marathons
Event	1st	2nd	3rd
Italian Marathon	1	0	0
Padua Marathon	1	0	0
Vienna Marathon	1	0	0

Rosaria Console, better known as Rosalba (born 17 December 1979 in Martina Franca, Taranto) is an Italian long-distance runner who specializes in the half marathon and marathon.

== Biography ==
She won four medals, one of these at junior level, at the International athletics competitions. She participated at two editions of the Summer Olympics (2004, 2012). She has 14 caps in national team from 1994 to 2012. She suffered a tibia problem in early 2011 but still managed to take fifth place at the Rome City Marathon in March. She won seven national championships (two on 10000 m in 2008 and 2016, four on half-marathon in 2003, 2009, 2010 and 2016, one on marathon in 2008).

== Achievements ==
Year	Competition	Venue	Position	Event	Notes
Representing Italy
1998	World Junior Championships	Annecy, France	18th (h)	5000m	16:51.21
1999	European U23 Championships	Gothenburg, Sweden	7th	5000m	15:51.35
1999	European U23 Championships	Gothenburg, Sweden	2nd	10,000m	33:05.77
1999	Universiade	Palma de Mallorca, Spain	1st	Half marathon	1:14:14
2001	Padua Marathon	Padua, Italy	1st	Marathon	2:30:55
2001	World Championships	Edmonton, Canada	20th	Marathon	2:34:11
2002	European Championships	Munich, Germany	5th	Marathon	2:35:23
2003	World Championships	Paris, France	—	Marathon	DNF
2004	Vienna Marathon	Vienna, Austria	1st	Marathon	2:29:22
2004	Olympic Games	Athens, Greece	16th	Marathon	2:35:56
2005	Mediterranean Games	Almería, Spain	2nd	Half marathon	1:15:40
2005	World Championships	Helsinki, Finland	19th	Marathon	2:32:47
2006	European Championships	Gothenburg, Sweden	—	Marathon	DNF
2008	Italian Marathon	Carpi, Italy	1st	Marathon	2:30:44
2009	Mediterranean Games	Pescara, Italy	2nd	Half marathon	1:12:34
2010	European Championships	Barcelona, Spain	8th	Marathon	2:36:20
2012	Olympic Games	London, Great Britain	30th	Marathon	2:30:09

== National titles ==
She has won the individual national championship 8 times.

- 3 wins in 10,000 metres (2008, 2016, 2018)
- 4 wins in half marathon (2003, 2009, 2010, 2016)
- 1 win in marathon (2008)

== See also ==
- Italian all-time top lists - Half marathon
- Italian all-time top lists - Marathon
