= 2008 IAAF Road Race Label Events =

Road running competition series

The 2008 IAAF Road Race Label Events were the inaugural edition of the global series of road running competitions given Label status by the International Association of Athletics Federations (IAAF). All five World Marathon Majors had Gold Label status. The races were mostly in North America, Western Europe, and East Asia. It was the first year that the IAAF had provided the race designation. The series included a total of 49 road races, 12 Gold and 37 Silver Label status. In terms of distance, 32 races were marathons, 8 were half marathons, 6 were 10K runs, and 3 were held over other distances.

The Ohme Road Race scheduled for 3 February was cancelled due to heavy snow.

== Races ==
- World Marathon Majors

Date	Label	Distance	Competition	Venue	Country	Men's winner	Women's winner
5 January 2008	Gold	Marathon	Xiamen International Marathon	Xiamen	China	Kiprotich Kenei (KEN)	Zhang Yingying (CHN)
20 January 2008	Silver	Marathon	Standard Chartered Mumbai Marathon	Mumbai	India	John Ekiru Kelai (KEN)	Mulu Seboka (ETH)
27 January 2008	Silver	Marathon	Osaka Intl Ladies Marathon	Osaka	Japan	–	Mara Yamauchi (GBR)
3 February 2008	Silver	10K run	Ohme 30Km/10Km Road	Ohme	Japan	Cancelled	Cancelled
3 February 2008	Silver	Half marathon	Kagawa Marugame Half Marathon	Marugame	Japan	Harun Njoroge Mbugua (KEN)	Philes Moora Ongori (KEN)
17 February 2008	Silver	Marathon	Tokyo Marathon	Tokyo	Japan	Viktor Röthlin (SUI)	Claudia Dreher (GER)
24 February 2008	Gold	10K run	World's Best 10k Race	San Juan	Puerto Rico	Deriba Merga (ETH)	Lornah Kiplagat (NED)
2 March 2008	Silver	Marathon	Lake Biwa Mainichi Marathon	Ōtsu	Japan	Mubarak Hassan Shami (QAT)	—
9 March 2008	Silver	Marathon	Nagoya Intl Women's Marathon	Nagoya	Japan	–	Yurika Nakamura (JPN)
15 March 2008	Silver	Half marathon	Fortis City-Pier-City Run	The Hague	Netherlands	Patrick Makau Musyoki (KEN)	Pauline Wangui Ngigi (KEN)
16 March 2008	Gold	Half marathon	EDP Half Marathon of Lisbon	Lisbon	Portugal	Haile Gebrselassie (ETH)	Salina Jebet Kosgei (KEN)
16 March 2008	Silver	Marathon	Maratona Città di Roma	Rome	Italy	Jonathan Kiptoo Yego (KEN)	Galina Bogomolova (RUS)
16 March 2008	Silver	Marathon	Seoul International Marathon	Seoul	South Korea	Sammy Korir (KEN)	Zhang Shujing (CHN)
29 March 2008	Silver	Half marathon	Hervis Prague Half Marathon	Prague	Czech Republic	Elijah Muturi Karanja (KEN)	Asha Gigi (ETH)
6 April 2008	Gold	Marathon	Marathon International de Paris	Paris	France	Tsegay Kebede (ETH)	Martha Komu (KEN)
13 April 2008	Gold	Marathon	Flora London Marathon	London	United Kingdom	Martin Lel (KEN)	Irina Mikitenko (GER)
13 April 2008	Silver	Marathon	Turin Marathon	Turin	Italy	Stephen Kipkoech Kibiwott (KEN)	Vincenza Sicari (ITA)
13 April 2008	Silver	Marathon	Fortis Rotterdam Marathon	Rotterdam	Netherlands	William Kipsang (KEN)	Lyubov Morgunova (RUS)
20 April 2008	Silver	Marathon	Nagano Olympic Commemorative Marathon	Nagano	Japan	Nephat Ngotho Kinyanjui (KEN)	Alevtina Ivanova (RUS)
21 April 2008	Gold	Marathon	B.A.A. Boston Marathon	Boston	United States	Robert Kipkoech Cheruiyot (KEN)	Dire Tune (ETH)
27 April 2008	Silver	Marathon	Conergy Marathon Hamburg	Hamburg	Germany	David Mandago Kipkorir (KEN)	Irina Timofeyeva (RUS)
27 April 2008	Silver	Marathon	Maraton de Madrid	Madrid	Spain	José Manuel Martínez (ESP)	Nguriatukei Rael Kiyara (KEN)
11 May 2008	Silver	Marathon	Volkswagen Prague Marathon	Prague	Czech Republic	Kenneth Mburu Mungara (KEN)	Nailiya Yulamanova (RUS)
18 May 2008	Silver	10K run	Course Féminine de Casablanca	Casablanca	Morocco	–	Firehiwot Dado (ETH)
24 May 2008	Silver	10K run	Mds Nordion 10K	Ottawa	Canada	Julius Kiptoo (KEN)	Emebet Bacha (ETH)
25 May 2008	Silver	Marathon	ING Ottawa Marathon	Ottawa	Canada	David Emmanuel Cheruiyot (KEN)	Asmae Leghzaoui (MAR)
31 May 2008	Silver	5K run	Freihofer's Run for Women	Troy, NY	United States	–	Benita Johnson (AUS)
31 August 2008	Silver	Marathon	Hokkaido Marathon	Hokkaido	Japan	Masaru Takamizawa (JPN)	Yukari Sahaku (JPN)
7 September 2008	Silver	10K run	Tilburg Ladies Run	Tilburg	Netherlands	–	Mestawet Tufa (ETH)
7 September 2008	Silver	10 miles	Tilburg Ten Miles	Tilburg	Netherlands	Abiyote Guta (ETH)	–
14 September 2008	Silver	Half marathon	Fortis Half Marathon Rotterdam	Rotterdam	Netherlands	Patrick Makau Musyoki (KEN)	Lydia Cheromei (KEN)
28 September 2008	Gold	Half marathon	RTP Half Marathon of Portugal	Lisbon	Portugal	Silas Kipngetich Sang (KEN)	Rita Jeptoo Sitienei (KEN)
28 September 2008	Gold	Marathon	real,- Berlin-Marathon	Berlin	Germany	Haile Gebrselassie (ETH)	Irina Mikitenko (GER)
28 September 2008	Silver	Marathon	Scotiabank Toronto Waterfront Marathon	Toronto	Canada	Kenneth Mburu Mungara (KEN)	Mulu Seboka (ETH)
5 October 2008	Silver	Marathon	Ford Cologne Marathon	Cologne	Germany	Sammy Kiptoo Kurgat (KEN)	Robe Guta (ETH)
5 October 2008	Silver	Marathon	ING Brussels Marathon	Brussels	Belgium	Rik Ceulemans (BEL)	Anne Zijderveld (NED)
12 October 2008	Gold	Marathon	Bank of America Chicago Marathon	Chicago	United States	Evans Kiprop Cheruiyot (KEN)	Lidiya Grigoryeva (RUS)
19 October 2008	Gold	Marathon	Beijing International Marathon	Beijing	China	Benjamin Kolum Kiptoo (KEN)	Bai Xue (CHN)
19 October 2008	Silver	Marathon	ING Amsterdam Marathon	Amsterdam	Netherlands	Paul Kiprop Kirui (KEN)	Lydia Cheromei (KEN)
26 October 2008	Silver	Half marathon	Classique Internationale Marseille-Cassis	Marseille	France	Wilson Kwambai Chebet (KEN)	Iness Chepkesis Chenonge (KEN)
26 October 2008	Silver	Marathon	Dresdner Kleinwort Frankfurt Marathon	Frankfurt	Germany	Robert Kiprono Cheruiyot (KEN)	Sabrina Mockenhaupt (GER)
2 November 2008	Gold	Marathon	ING New York City Marathon	New York City	United States	Marílson dos Santos (BRA)	Paula Radcliffe (GBR)
2 November 2008	Silver	Marathon	JoongAng Seoul Marathon	Seoul	South Korea	Solomon Molla (ETH)	Lee Sun-young (KOR)
9 November 2008	Gold	Half marathon	Airtel Delhi Half Marathon	New Delhi	India	Deriba Merga (ETH)	Aselefech Mergia (KEN)
9 November 2008	Silver	Marathon	Athens Classic Marathon	Athens	Greece	Paul Nicholas Lekuraa (KEN)	Mai Tagami (JPN)
9 November 2008	Silver	10K run	Athens 10Km	Athens	Greece	Olivier Windwehr (FRA)	Rkia Elmoukim (MAR)
16 November 2008	Silver	Marathon	Tokyo Intl Women's Marathon	Tokyo	Japan	–	Yoshimi Ozaki (JPN)
16 November 2008	Silver	15K run	Fortis Zevenheuvelenloop	Nijmegen	Netherlands	Ayele Abshero (ETH)	Mestawet Tufa (ETH)
7 December 2008	Silver	Marathon	Fukuoka Intl Open Marathon Champs	Fukuoka	Japan	Tsegay Kebede (ETH)	–
