= Ashu Kasim =

Ethiopian long-distance runner

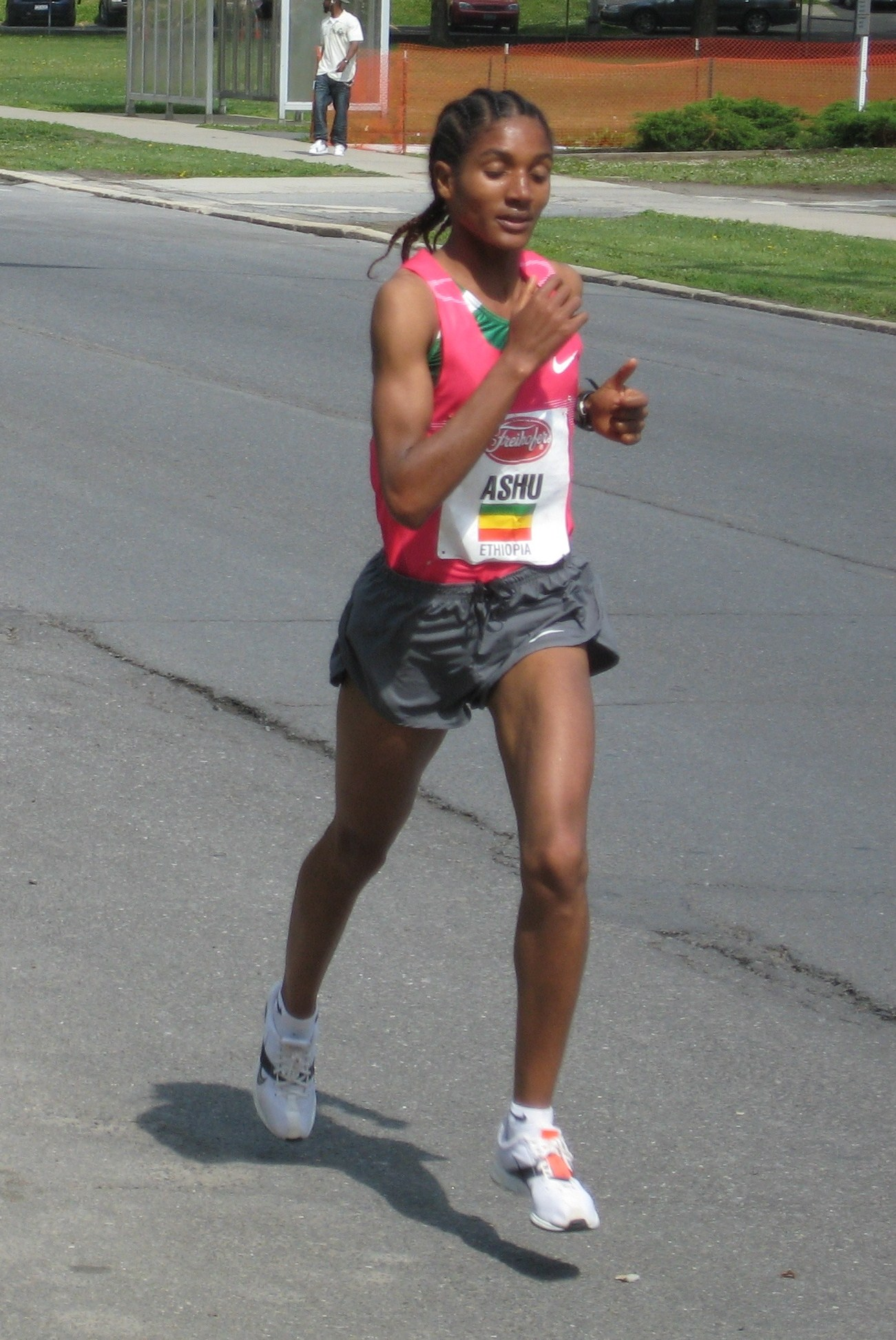
Ashu at the 2009 Freihofer's Run for Women

Ashu Kasim Rabo (born 20 October 1984) is an Ethiopian long-distance runner who specialises in the half marathon and marathon events. Her personal bests are 68:56 minutes and 2:23:09 hours, respectively.

She has won the Istanbul Marathon (2010) and the Xiamen Marathon (2012). Ashu has represented Ethiopia internationally on three occasions: at the 2003 IAAF World Half Marathon Championships, the 2006 IAAF World Road Running Championships, and in the 10,000 metres at the 2007 All-Africa Games (where she was fourth).

== Career ==
She competed at the 2003 IAAF World Half Marathon Championships in Vilamoura, Portugal and finished in 47th place. Running at the 2006 IAAF World Road Running Championships, she finished 17th and helped the Ethiopian team of Dire Tune and Teyba Erkesso to the team silver medal. She had further success on the track the following year as she was fourth in the 10,000 metres at the 2007 All-Africa Games. She won the 15K Boilermaker Road Race in 2008.

Ashu made her marathon debut at the 2009 Paris Marathon and recorded a best of 2:25:49 for fourth place. In October she participated in the Istanbul Marathon and claimed second place behind Bizunesh Urgesa. She ran at the 2010 Prague Marathon and finished in third place with a time of 2:29:54. She returned to Istanbul that year and reached the top of the podium with a course record run of 2:27:25.

She started her 2011 season with a runner-up finish at the Houston Marathon, cross the line after fellow Ethiopian Mamitu Daska. She took on Daska again at the Paris Marathon in April and outperformed her rival, but managed only sixth overall. In October she attempted to defend her title at the Istanbul Marathon, but came fourth while other Ethiopians swept the medals in the women's race.

Ashu won the 2012 Xiamen International Marathon in a new personal best time of 2:23:09. In June she was runner-up at the Freihofer's Run for Women 5K in New York. In her second Chinese race that year, she was runner-up to Feyse Tadese at the Shanghai Marathon, crossing the line in 2:24:09 hours.

A half marathon best came at the 2013 RAK Half Marathon the following February, where she ran 68:56 minutes to again finish a place behind Feyse Tadese in tenth. She placed fourth at the Rome City Marathon in March then won at the Lanzhou Marathon in June. Her best outing was her last of the year: she came third at the Shanghai Marathon in a time of 2:26:34 hours.

Ashu was the runner-up at the 2014 Seoul International Marathon, finishing behind Helah Kiprop.

== Statistics ==
=== International competitions ===
Year	Competition	Venue	Position	Event
2003	World Half Marathon Championships	Vilamoura, Portugal	47th	Half marathon
2006	World Road Running Championships	Debrecen, Hungary	17th	20 km
2007	All-Africa Games	Algiers, Algeria	4th	10,000 m

=== Marathons ===
Year	Competition	Venue	Position	Notes
2009	Istanbul Marathon	Istanbul, Turkey	2nd	Marathon
2010	Istanbul Marathon	Istanbul, Turkey	1st	Marathon
2011	Istanbul Marathon	Istanbul, Turkey	4th	Marathon
2012	Xiamen International Marathon	Xiamen, China	1st	Marathon

=== Personal bests ===
- 1500 metres - 4:14.03 min (2007)
- 3000 metres - 9:02.43 min (2005)
- 5000 metres - 15:32.33 min (2007)
- 10,000 metres - 31:46.05 min (2007)
- Half marathon - 68:56 min (2013)
- Marathon - 2:23:09 hrs (2012)
