= Lübbe =

Lübbe is a German surname. Notable people with the surname include:

- Ann Cathrin Lübbe (born 1971), Norwegian Paralympic equestrian
- Heinrich Lübbe, German engineer
- Marinus van der Lubbe, Dutch communist tried, convicted and executed for setting fire to the German Reichstag building in 1933
- Melanie Lubbe (born 1990), German chess grandmaster
- Vollrath Lübbe, highly decorated World War II Wehrmacht general
