= Siraj Gena =

Ethiopian marathon runner (born 1984)

Siraj Amda Gena, also known as Giday Amha and Siraj Amda Bene, (born 12 November 1984) is an Ethiopian long-distance runner who specialises in the marathon. He won his first race in 2010, beating all-comers at the Rome City Marathon to set a personal best of 2:08:39.

== Career ==
He began his professional career in 2005 and he set a personal best time of 2:11:26 to finish third in the Dubai Marathon. He returned to the race the following year and came one place further to winning, although he would have won if Joseph Ngeny Kiprotich, initially brought in as a pacemaker, hadn't decided to continue and finish the race instead. He competed in Asia for a second time that year and took fifth place at the Nagano Marathon, although he was leading the race throughout right until the 30 km mark. He failed to make much progression in the 2007 and 2008; years which were highlighted by a 13th-place finish at the Amsterdam Marathon and a fourth place at the Nagano Marathon, respectively.

He took part in the Frankfurt Marathon for the first time in 2009 and although he finished in ninth position, he set a personal best of 2:10:41. Gena began to make his mark on the road running circuit in 2010 as he began the year with a second-place finish behind Denis Ndiso at the Mumbai Marathon (an IAAF Gold Label Road Race). His first ever marathon win soon followed: he ran his fastest ever time (2:08:39) to gain victory at the Rome City Marathon. The event was made more special by the fact that it was in honour of the 50th anniversary of Ethiopian Abebe Bikila's Olympic gold in the 1960 Rome Olympic marathon, in which he became the first black African to win an Olympic gold medal. Gena marked the occasion by removing his shoes to run barefoot for the last 300 metres, mirroring the shoe-less running style of Bikila and earning a 5000€ bonus in the process.

Gena won his second marathon of 2010 in October at the Beijing International Marathon. Cold, wet weather severely affected the race, leaving him shivering as he crossed the line in 2:15:45, but his coach (former runner Haji Adillo) said he thought Gena could run around the 2:06 mark in good conditions. He was one of the favourite for the 2011 Xiamen Marathon in January, but he finished in fifth place. He attempted to retain his title in Rome in March 2011 but had to settle for second place, thirty seconds adrift of winner Dickson Chumba. He ran a half marathon best of 1:02:36 hours at the Göteborgsvarvet, and the Frankfurt Marathon in October saw him improve his marathon best to 2:08:31 hours (finishing in eighth).

On November 17, 2013, Gena finished second at the Istanbul Marathon in a time of 2:13:19 hours behind French athlete Abraham Kiprotich. He was subsequently promoted to first place following Kiprotich's disqualification for a doping offence.

== Achievements ==
Year	Competition	Position	Distance	Time (h:m:s)
2005	Dubai Marathon	3rd	Marathon	2:11:26
2006	Dubai Marathon	2nd	Marathon	2:14:25
2010	Mumbai Marathon	2nd	Marathon	2:13:58
2010	Rome City Marathon	1st	Marathon	2:08:39
2013	Istanbul Marathon	1st	Marathon	2:13:19
2016	Buenos Aires Marathon	1st	Marathon	2:20:24

== Personal bests ==
Event	Time (h:m:s)	Venue	Date
Marathon	2:08:31	Frankfurt Marathon	30 October 2011

- All information taken from IAAF profile.
