= Vinnitskaya =

Vinnitskaya is a feminine East Slavic surname. Notable people with the surname include:

- Alena Vinnitskaya (born 1974), Ukrainian singer
- Alena Vinnitskaya (born 1973), Belarusian long-distance runner
- Anna Vinnitskaya (born 1983), Russian pianist
