= Alena Vinnitskaya (athlete) =

Belarusian marathon runner

Alena Vinnitskaya (Belarusian: Алена Віньніцкая; born 23 August 1973) is a Belarusian long-distance runner who specializes in the marathon.

== Biography ==
In the 10,000 metres she finished tenth at the 1992 World Junior Championships. After that she concentrated on the marathon. She finished 31st at the 1997 World Championships, and 28th at the 1998 European Championships.

She also won the Prague Marathon in 1996, 1997 and 1998. In the 1999 edition, she achieved her personal best time of 2:33:20. She has one Belarusian national title on the track: in the 10,000 metres in 1993.

In 1998, she won the California International Marathon in Sacramento with her personal best of 2:32:41. The following year, she won the Las Vegas Marathon and second in Prague. She won the Carlsbad Marathon in 1999, 2001, 2002 and 2003, and she won the Wrocław Marathon in 2000.

In 2002, she was second in the Austin Marathon, third in the Columbus Marathon, and second in the California International Marathon. She finished third in Austin in 2004, third in the Poznań Marathon in 2005, and fourth in Sacramento in 2005. In 2006, she placed sixth in the Houston Marathon, third in Austin, and second in the Hartford Marathon.

In 2007, she won second place in the 2007 Twin Cities Marathon, followed by a victory in the 2008 Georgia Marathon.

In 2010, she finished fourth at 26.2 with Donna and won the Pittsburgh Marathon.
