= Istanbul Half Marathon =

Annual marathon

- Date: April
- Location: Istanbul, Turkey
- Event type: Road
- Distance: Half marathon
- Primary sponsor: Türkiye İş Bankası
- Established: 2014
- Course records: Men's: 59:15 (2022) (Kenya) Rodgers Kwemoi; Women's: 1:04:02 WR (2021) (Kenya) Ruth Chepngetich
- Website: Istanbul Half Marathon
- Participants: 3,389 finishers (2022); 2,410 (2021); 1,638 (2020); 2,606 (2019)

The Istanbul Half Marathon (Turkish: İstanbul Yarı Maratonu) is an annual road running event over the half marathon distance (21.1 km) that takes place on the streets of Istanbul, Turkey in April. The event is sponsored by Vodafone. It was promoted to the IAAF Gold Label status for 2017.

== History ==
The event was established in 1987 under the name "Haliç Yarı Maratonu" ("Golden Horn Half Marathon"), and continued to run until 1993. After a break of 17 years, it revived in 2010 under the name "8th International Golden Horn Half Marathon" with participation of around 1,500 athletes from 22 nations.

The organization of the half marathon took afour-year break until 2015 when the Istanbul Metropolitan Municipality re-established the road running event under the name "Istanbul Half Marathon", and Vodafon took over the sponsorship. The start-finish line of the event was relocated to Balat on the coast of Golden Horn.

The first edition immediately attracted high caliber elite runners, resulting in quick winning times of 1:00:13 minutes in the men's category and 1:06:38 minutes in the women's race. A total of 2,095 runners finished the inaugural mass race in Istanbul.

The event was organized by Istanbul Sports Events – the organizer of the long-running Istanbul Marathon event. The half marathon course begins and ends in Eyüp in the central-western part of the city, following a route south to the seafront area of Eminönü. Among other sights, it passes the Golden Horn, Yenikapı square and Kadir Has University. A 10K run is also hosted for amateur runners and this section had over 1500 finishers in 2016.

The 2016 edition of the race gained IAAF Bronze Label status and the field included world record breakers Zersenay Tadese and Leonard Patrick Komon. That year, the event was staged on the same weekend as the Presidential Cycling Tour of Turkey.

In December 2016, it was announced that the event was promoted to IAAF Gold Label status for 2017.

The race in 2021 ended with a course record in 59:32 by Kenyan Kibiwott Kandie| and a world record for women in 1:04:02 by Kenyan Ruth Chepngetich.

== Past winners ==
Legend:

- CR: Course record
- WR: World record

Year	Men's winner	Time (h:m:s)	Women's winner	Time (h:m:s)
2014	Fetene Regasa (ETH)	1:05:20	Bahar Doğan (TUR)	1:16:33
2015	Evans Kiplagat (KEN)	1:00:13	Gladys Cherono (KEN)	1:06:37
2016	Ali Kaya (TUR)	1:00:16	Violah Jepchumba (KEN)	1:08:18
2017	Ismail Juma (TAN)	1:00:09	Ruth Chepngetich (KEN)	1:06:19
2018	Amedework Walelegn (ETH)	59:50	Ababel Yeshaneh (ETH)	1:06:22
2019	Benard Ngeno (KEN)	59:56	Ruth Chepngetich (KEN)	1:05:30
2020	Sezgin Ataç (TUR)	1:03:16	Fatma Demir (TUR)	1:13:17
2021	Kibiwott Kandie (KEN)	59:35	Ruth Chepngetich (KEN)	1:04:02; CR
2022	Rodgers Kwemoi (KEN)	59:15; CR	Hellen Obiri (KEN)	1:04:48
2023	Daniel Ebenyo (KEN)	59:52	Purity Komen (KEN)	1:06:30
2024	Hicham Amghar (MAR)	59:47	Sheila Chelangat (KEN)	1:06:47
2025	Alex Matata (KEN)	59:40	Miriam Chebet (KEN)	1:06:07
