= Mehtap Doğan-Sızmaz =

Turkish long-distance runner

Personal information
- Nationality: Turkey
- Born: Sızmaz; November 16, 1978 (age 47)

Sport
- Sport: Long-distance
- Club: Beşiktaş J.K. Athletics Team

Achievements and titles
- Personal best: Marathon - 2:31:13 (2006)
Medal record
Women's athletics
Representing Turkey
Marathons
Gold medal – first place	2009 Madrid	Marathon
Bronze medal – third place	2008 Istanbul	Marathon
Silver medal – second place	2003 Istanbul	Marathon
Mediterranean Games
Gold medal – first place	2001 Tunis	Marathon

Mehtap Doğan-Sızmaz, née Sızmaz, (born November 16, 1978) is a Turkish long-distance runner, who specialized in the marathon.

She won the gold medal in the women's marathon at the 2001 Mediterranean Games held in Tunis, Tunisia. She set a women's course record on the way to victory at the 2009 Madrid Marathon. She made a strong start at the 2010 Düsseldorf Marathon in April, but ended up dropping out after leading the race early on.

Doğan-Sızmaz is currently serving an eight-year competition ban to run from 2017 to 2015 following violations against anti-doping regulations (administration and trafficking).

== Achievements ==
Year	Competition	Venue	Position	Event	Notes
1999	21st Istanbul Marathon	Istanbul, Turkey	5th	15 km	53:48
2001	2001 Mediterranean Games	Tunis, Tunisia	1st	Marathon	2.40.48
2003	23rd Istanbul Marathon	Istanbul, Turkey	2nd	Marathon	2:39:13
2007	29th Istanbul Marathon	Istanbul, Turkey	7th	Marathon	2:37:41
2008	30th Istanbul Marathon	Istanbul, Turkey	3rd	Marathon	2:33:17
2009	32nd Madrid Marathon	Madrid, Spain	1st	Marathon	2:32:04

=== Personal bests ===
- Marathon - 2:31:13 (2006)
