= Fikre Bekele =

Ethiopian long-distance runner

Personal information
- Nationality: Ethiopian
- Born: Fikre Bekele Tefera; September 11, 1998 (age 27) Ethiopia
- Occupation: Long-distance runner
- Years active: 2019–present

Sport
- Country: Ethiopia
- Sport: Long-distance running
- Events: Marathon, Half marathon

Achievements and titles
- Personal bests: Marathon: 2:06:16 (Linz, 2022); Half Marathon: 1:02:20 (Ras Al Khaimah, 2020)

Fikre Bekele (born 11 September 1998), also known as Fikre Bekele Tefera, is an Ethiopian long-distance runner specializing in the marathon and half marathon. He is known for winning the 2019 Frankfurt Marathon, 2022 Rome Marathon, and 2022 Linz Marathon.

== Career ==
Fikre made his international debut at the 2019 Seoul International Marathon, where he finished fourth with a time of 2:06:27. He secured his first career victory later that year at the 2019 Frankfurt Marathon, where he out-kicked a competitive field to claim the title.

In February 2020, Fikre achieved his personal best in the half marathon, clocking 1:02:20 in Ras Al Khaimah.

In 2022, Fikre won the Rome Marathon with a new course record of 2:06:48 and followed this up by winning the Linz Marathon, setting another course record and achieving a new personal best time of 2:06:16, which remains his current personal best.

== Personal bests ==
- Marathon: 2:06:16 – Linz, 2022
- Half Marathon: 1:02:20 – Ras Al Khaimah, 2020

== Major results ==
Year	Competition	Location	Position	Time
2019	Seoul International Marathon	Seoul, South Korea	4th	2:06:27
2019	Frankfurt Marathon	Frankfurt, Germany	1st	2:07:08
2022	Rome Marathon	Rome, Italy	1st	2:06:48
2022	Linz Marathon	Linz, Austria	1st	2:06:16
