= Olga Glok =

Russian long-distance runner

Personal information
- Nationality: Russian
- Born: December 16, 1982 (age 42) Russia

Sport
- Country: Russia
- Sport: Long-distance running

Olga Glok (Russian: Ольга Глок; born 16 December 1982) is a Russian long-distance runner who competes in marathon races. She represented her country at the 2009 World Championships in Athletics. She has a marathon best of 2:27:18 hours and has won the Prague Marathon and Twin Cities Marathon.

== Biography ==
She made her debut over the distance at the 2004 Moscow Marathon, coming third in the national championship race with a time of 2:37:01 hours. Later that year she came third at the Istanbul Marathon. In 2005, she won the Bremerhaven Marathon and managed eighth at the Frankfurt Marathon. Her highlight of 2006 was a win at the Dresden Marathon in 2:35:26 hours, with her other performances being eighth at the Vienna City Marathon and fifth at the Russian Championships race.

Her breakthrough came in 2007 when she ran a personal best of 1:09:58 hours for the half marathon at the IAAF World Road Running Championships. Her 17th-place finish helped the Russian women to fifth in the team rankings. A marathon personal best followed at the Istanbul Marathon, where her time of 2:31:12 hours took her to third place. She improved this further to 2:30:40 hours in a tenth-place finish at the 2008 Paris Marathon and went on to win the Twin Cities Marathon that October.

A winning time of 2:28:27 hours at the 2009 Prague Marathon earned her a place on the national team. In the race at the 2009 World Championships in Athletics she came 29th overall. She placed ninth at the high-profile 2010 Amsterdam Marathon and was runner-up to Rasa Drazdauskaite at the Athens Classic Marathon (setting a season's best of 2:33:51 hours). Her sole marathon outing of 2011 was a run at the Dublin Marathon and she missed the podium with a fourth-place finish.

Glok set a personal best at the 2012 Vienna City Marathon, edging Helalia Johannes to second place with a finishing time of 2:27:18 hours.
