= Benard Kipkorir Ngeno =

Kenyan long-distance runner

Personal information
- Born: 10 August 1996 (age 29)

Sport
- Country: Kenya
- Sport: Athletics
- Event: Long-distance running

Benard Kipkorir Ngeno (born 10 August 1996) is a Kenyan long-distance runner. In 2020, he competed in the men's race at the 2020 World Athletics Half Marathon Championships held in Gdynia, Poland.

In 2019, he won the men's race at the Istanbul Half Marathon held in Istanbul, Turkey.
