= Evans Kiplagat Barkowet =

Kenyan-Azerbaijani long-distance runner

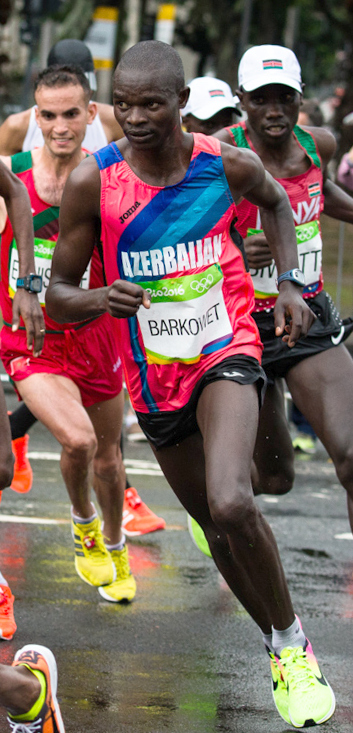
- Barkowet at the 2016 Olympics

Personal information
- Born: 5 March 1988 (age 38)
- Height: 170 cm (5 ft 7 in)
- Weight: 60 kg (132 lb)

Sport
- Sport: Athletics
- Events: half marathon, marathon

Evans Kiplagat Barkowet (born 5 March 1988) is a Kenyan long-distance runner who competes for Azerbaijan since June 2016 when he gained citizenship.

== Career ==
He emerged in national events in 2008 before competing abroad in road running events, with a third-place finish at the 2009 Lille Half Marathon in 59:56, establishing him as an elite level runner. He made his marathon debut at the Amsterdam Marathon in 2009, finishing the distance in 2:10:46 hours. His next outing was the Frankfurt Marathon in 2010, placing ninth in a time of 2:10:07 hours. He ran two further marathons in 2011, taking third at the Vienna City Marathon in a personal best of 2:09:22 hours, before a return to Amsterdam, where he was tenth in 2:10:42.

His performances declined in the 2012 season, though his run of 2:16:43 hours at the Istanbul Marathon was good enough for a third-place finish. He was runner-up at the Rabat Half Marathon and Darıca Half Marathon in 2013. The 2015 season saw him continue his form, with wins at the Tarsus and Istanbul Half Marathons, his first marathon win in Iten, and runner-up finishes in Prague and Istanbul. He appeared for Azerbaijan at the 2016 European Athletics Championships, placing 19th in the half marathon, and at the 2016 Summer Olympics, where he finished 28th in the marathon.

In 2019, he competed in the men's marathon at the 2019 World Athletics Championships held in Doha, Qatar. He did not finish his race.

== International competitions ==
Year	Competition	Venue	Position	Event	Notes
2016	European Championships	Amsterdam, Netherlands	19th	Half marathon	1:05:01
2019	World Championships	Doha, Qatar	–	Marathon	DNF

== See also ==
- List of eligibility transfers in athletics
