= Asbel Rutto =

Kenyan long-distance runner

Personal information
- Nationality: Kenyan
- Born: Asbel Rutto; February 12, 2002 (age 24) Kenya
- Occupation: Long-distance runner
- Years active: 2022–present

Sport
- Country: Kenya
- Sport: Long-distance running
- Events: Marathon, 10km Road, 25km Road

Achievements and titles
- Personal bests: Marathon: 2:06:24 (Rome, 2024); 10 Kilometres Road: 27:55 (Durban, 2023); 25 Kilometres Road: 1:13:36 (Nairobi, 2024)

Asbel Rutto (born 12 February 2002) is a Kenyan long-distance runner specializing in the marathon. He rose to prominence with his course record victory at the 2024 Rome Marathon and holds a personal best of 2:06:24 in the event.

== Career ==
Asbel made his international debut in road races, notably improving his 10 km personal best to 27:55 when he placed third at the 2023 Absa Run Your City Durban 10K.

Asbel's breakthrough came in the marathon in 2024. On March 17, 2024, he won the Rome Marathon in a new course record time of 2:06:24. This performance also marked a significant personal best for Asbel, improving his previous best by over three minutes. During the race, he led at the halfway point with a split of 1:02:36 and sustained his lead to win his first career marathon.

He also holds a personal best of 1:13:36 in the 25 kilometres road race, set in Nairobi in December 2024.

== Personal bests ==
- Marathon: 2:06:24 – Rome, 2024
- 10 Kilometres Road: 27:55 – Durban, 2023
- 25 Kilometres Road: 1:13:36 – Nairobi, 2024

== Major results ==
Year	Competition	Location	Position	Time
2023	Absa Run Your City Durban 10K	Durban, South Africa	3rd	27:55
2024	Rome Marathon	Rome, Italy	1st	2:06:24
2026	Rome Marathon	Rome, Italy	1st	2:06:32
