= Betty Chepkwony =

Kenyan long-distance runner

Personal information
- Nationality: Kenyan
- Born: Betty Chepkwony; April 26, 1995 (age 31) Kenya
- Occupation: Long-distance runner
- Years active: 2019–present

Sport
- Country: Kenya
- Sport: Long-distance running
- Events: Marathon, Half marathon, 10km Road

Achievements and titles
- Personal bests: Marathon: 2:23:02 (Rome, 2023); Half Marathon: 1:14:06 (2024); 10 Kilometres Road: 32:46 (2019)

Betty Chepkwony (born 26 April 1995) is a Kenyan long-distance runner specializing in the marathon. She is a two-time winner of the Rome Marathon, securing titles in 2023 with a personal best of 2:23:02 and again in 2025.

== Career ==
Chepkwony started her international career primarily in road races. She set her personal best in the 10-kilometre road race with a time of 32:46 in 2019. Her half marathon personal best stands at 1:14:06, achieved in 2024.

Chepkwony won the 2023 Rome Marathon with a new personal best time of 2:23:02.

She reclaimed her title at the 2025 Rome Marathon. In a hard-fought race, Chepkwony pulled away in the final kilometers to win in 2:26:16. She also finished ninth in the 2024 Frankfurt Marathon with a time of 2:25:13.

== Personal bests ==
- Marathon: 2:23:02 – Rome, 2023
- Half Marathon: 1:14:06 – 2024
- 10 Kilometres Road: 32:46 – 2019

== Major results ==
Year	Competition	Location	Position	Time
2023	Rome Marathon	Rome, Italy	1st	2:23:02
2024	Frankfurt Marathon	Frankfurt, Germany	9th	2:25:13
2025	Rome Marathon	Rome, Italy	1st	2:26:16
