= Ohme =

Ohme is a surname. Notable people with the surname include:

- Johan Andreas Cornelius Ohme (1746–1818), Danish-Norwegian army officer
- Kevin Ohme (born 1971), Major League Baseball pitcher
- Melanie Ohme (born 1990), German chess player
