= Bizunesh Urgesa =

Ethiopian long-distance runner

Bizunesh Mohammed Urgesa (born 18 June 1989 in Negele Arsi, Oromia Region) is an Ethiopian long-distance runner who competes in the marathon.

She started out as an 800 and 1500 metres runner. She ran in the latter event at the 2005 World Youth Championships in Athletics and won the bronze medal, setting a personal best of 4:19.34 minutes. At the 2005 African Junior Athletics Championships, she came fifth over 800 m and was the silver medallist in the 1500 m. She made her first international cross country appearance two years later, finishing in 14th place in the junior race at the 2007 IAAF World Cross Country Championships, helping the Ethiopian girls team to a bronze medal alongside Sule Utura, Genzebe Dibaba and Abebu Gelan.

Turning to the track, she set a 1500 m best for third place at the CAA Grand Prix in Brazzaville in May, but began to focus on longer distances on the European track and field circuit in the following months. That July, she set a 5000 metres best of 15:14.90 in Liège before running a new 3000 metres best of 9:02.08 in Zaragoza two days later. A performance at the Memorial van Damme preceded her appearance at the 2007 IAAF World Athletics Final, where she came ninth in the 3000 m. In her final year of solely focusing on track performances, she improved her 3000 m best to 8:53.14 at the Rabat Meeting and went on to win the 3000 m silver medal at the 2008 World Junior Championships in Athletics, finishing just behind Mercy Cherono. She came third in the 10,000 metres at the Ethiopian championships in 2009, but began to make a transition to road running thereafter.

She made her road debut at the Dam tot Damloop in Zaandam that September and came sixth in the ten-mile race. Urgesa made her marathon debut a month later and defeated Ashu Kasim to take victory on her first attempt at the Istanbul Marathon. She improved her best for the distance to 2:31:09 with a second career win at the Mumbai Marathon in January 2010. She finished seventh at the Paris Marathon and came fourth on her return to the Istanbul race. A second outing at Mumbai also brought disappointment, as she failed to defend her title and ended the race in fifth place. The Beirut Marathon in November saw her run faster than the previous course record, although she finished runner-up to Seada Kedir.
