= Lyudmyla Pushkina =

Ukrainian long-distance runner

Lyudmyla Pushkina (Ukrainian: Людмила Пушкіна; born October 2, 1965) is a female long-distance runner from Ukraine. She set her personal best (2:28:15) in the women's marathon on October 19, 2003, in Columbus, Ohio.

== Achievements ==
Year	Competition	Venue	Position	Event	Notes
Representing Ukraine
2001	Istanbul Marathon	Istanbul, Turkey	1st	Marathon	2:38:21
2002	Vienna City Marathon	Vienna, Austria	1st	Marathon	2:32:03
2002	Columbus Marathon	Columbus, United States	1st	Marathon	2:28:23
2003	Columbus Marathon	Columbus, United States	1st	Marathon	2:28:15
2004	California International Marathon	Sacramento, United States	1st	Marathon	2:37:21
2005	Columbus Marathon	Columbus, United States	1st	Marathon	2:29:56
2006	Los Angeles Marathon	Los Angeles, United States	7th	Marathon	2:41:15
2009	Saint Jude Memphis Marathon	Memphis, United States	2nd	Marathon	2:51:11
