= Peris Jerono =

Kenyan long-distance runner

Personal information
- Nationality: Kenyan
- Born: Peris Jerono Lagat; 1990 (age 35–36) Kenya
- Occupation: Long-distance runner
- Years active: 2014–present

Sport
- Country: Kenya
- Sport: Long-distance running
- Events: Marathon, Half marathon, 10km Road

Achievements and titles
- Personal bests: Marathon: 2:28:27 (Dongying, 2018); Half Marathon: 1:13:22 (Krakow, 2014); 10 Kilometres Road: 33:23 (2014)

Peris Jerono (born 1990), also known as Peris Jerono Lagat, is a Kenyan long-distance runner specializing in the marathon. Her career highlights include winning the 2021 Rome Marathon and achieving her marathon personal best of 2:28:27 in 2018.

== Career ==
Peris began her international career competing in road races. She set her personal best in the 10-kilometre road race with a time of 33:23 and her half marathon personal best of 1:13:22 in 2014.

In 2018, Peris achieved her marathon personal best of 2:28:27 at the Yellow River Estuary International Marathon, where she finished third.

In 2021 she won the Rome Marathon with a time of 2:29:29.

In 2022, she finished second at the Münster Marathon with a time of 2:28:53. She also took third place at the 2024 Nairobi City Marathon (2:30:43) and third at the 2025 Lagos City Marathon (2:38:09).

== Personal bests ==
- Marathon: 2:28:27 – Dongying, 2018
- Half Marathon: 1:13:22 – Krakow, 2014
- 10 Kilometres Road: 33:23 – 2014

== Major results ==
Year	Competition	Location	Position	Time
2018	Yellow River Estuary International Marathon	Dongying, China	3rd	2:28:27
2021	Rome Marathon	Rome, Italy	1st	2:29:29
2022	Münster Marathon	Münster, Germany	2nd	2:28:53
2024	Nairobi City Marathon	Nairobi, Kenya	3rd	2:30:43
2025	Lagos City Marathon	Lagos, Nigeria	3rd	2:38:09
