= Rahma Tusa =

Ethiopian long-distance runner

Personal information
- Born: 14 September 1993 (age 32)

Sport
- Country: Ethiopia
- Sport: Long-distance running

Rahma Tusa (born 14 September 1993) is an Ethiopian long-distance runner. She won the women's race of the Rome Marathon in Rome, Italy in 2016, 2017 and 2018.

In November 2017, she won the women's race at Boulogne-Billancourt Half Marathon held in Boulogne-Billancourt, France. A month later, she won the women's race at the Guangzhou Marathon held in Guangzhou, China.

In 2018, she finished in 5th place in the 2018 New York City Marathon held in New York City, United States. The following year, she won the women's half marathon event at the Rock 'n' Roll San Diego Marathon held in San Diego, United States.
