= Nikolas Lubbe =

German chess grandmaster (born 1990)

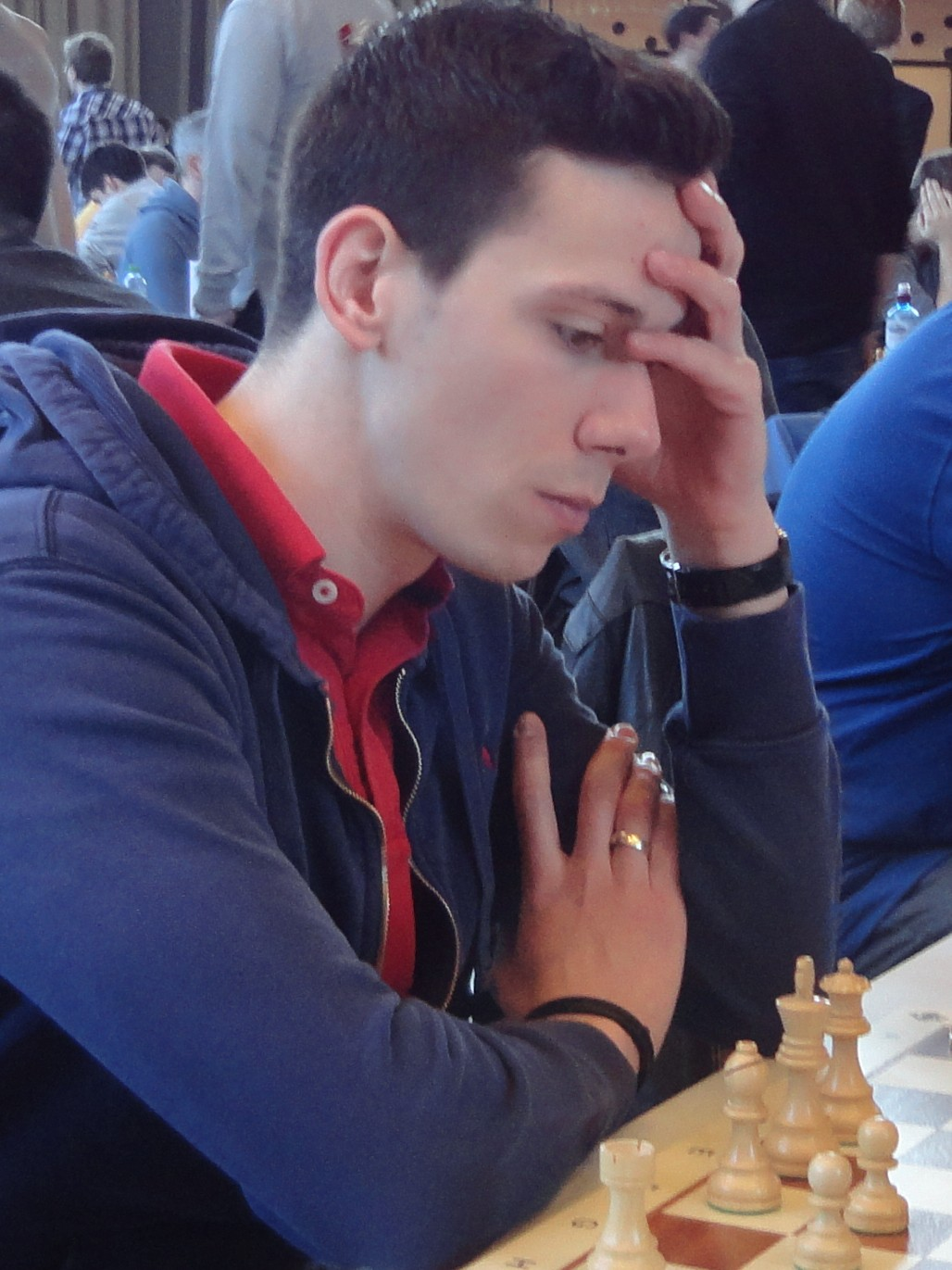

Personal information
- Born: August 14, 1990 (age 35) Wilhelmshaven, Germany
- Spouse: Melanie Ohme (m. 2015)

Chess career
- Country: Germany
- Title: Grandmaster (2023)
- FIDE rating: 2469 (July 2026)
- Peak rating: 2518 (November 2015)

Nikolas Lubbe is a German chess grandmaster.

== Chess career ==
He began playing chess at the age of 7 from his brother, joining a local chess club the following year. He was the U10 Lower Saxony Individual Champion in 2000.

He was awarded the Grandmaster title in 2023, after achieving his norms at the:

- GM-Turnier Braunschweig 150 Jahre SBG in October 2019
- Bundesliga West 2021/2022 in July 2022
- Chessemy Open A in March 2023

== Personal life ==
In 2015, he married fellow German chess player Melanie Ohme. They both play for the Hamburger SK chess club.
