= Sechale Dalasa =

Ethiopian long-distance runner

Personal information
- Nationality: Ethiopian
- Born: September 20, 1991 (age 34) Ethiopia
- Occupation: Long-distance runner
- Years active: 2012–present

Sport
- Country: Ethiopia
- Sport: Long-distance running
- Event: Marathon

Achievements and titles
- Personal bests: Marathon: 2:25:54 (Istanbul, 2022)

Sechale Dalasa (born 20 September 1991) is an Ethiopian long-distance runner specializing in the marathon. She is best known for her victories at the 2022 Rome Marathon and the 2022 Istanbul Marathon, where she set her personal best of 2:25:54.

== Career ==
Sechale made her marathon debut in 2012, running an early personal best of 2:26:27 at the Shanghai Marathon. Over the years, she consistently posted times between 2:26 and 2:28 in various marathons, including multiple appearances at the Houston Marathon.

Her career saw a significant peak in 2022. In March, Sechale won the Rome Marathon with a time of 2:26:09. Later that year, in November, she secured another major victory at the Istanbul Marathon. Despite humid conditions, Sechale ran a dominant race, winning with a new personal best of 2:25:54. She expressed pride in her victory and record-breaking performance.

== Personal bests ==
- Marathon: 2:25:54 – Istanbul, 2022

== Major results ==
Year	Competition	Location	Position	Time
2012	Shanghai Marathon	Shanghai, China	5th	2:26:27
2022	Rome Marathon	Rome, Italy	1st	2:26:09
2022	Istanbul Marathon	Istanbul, Turkey	1st	2:25:54
