= Istanbul Marathon =

Annual race in Turkey held since 1979

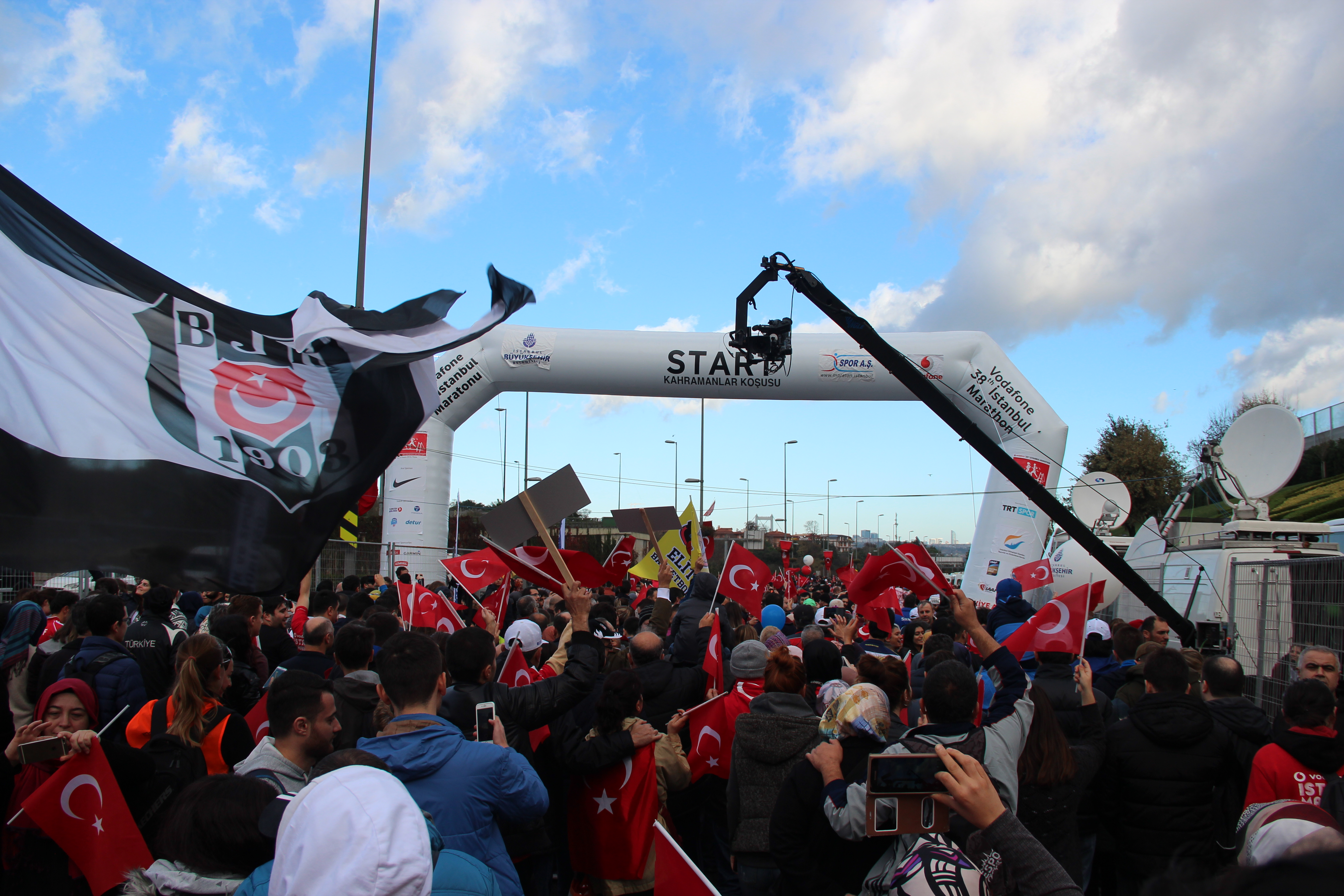
- Starting point of the 28th Eurasia Marathon, 2016
- Date: November
- Location: Istanbul, Turkey
- Event type: Road
- Distance: Marathon
- Primary sponsor: Türkiye İş Bankası
- Established: October 1979 (47 years ago)
- Course records: Men: 2:08:45 (2026) (Kenya) Philimon Kiptoo Kipchumba; Women: 2:18:35 (2018) (Kenya) Ruth Chepngetich
- Website: Istanbul Marathon
- Participants: 3,006 finishers (2021); 1,496 finishers (2020); 2,854 (2019); 3,404 (2018); 571 (2003)

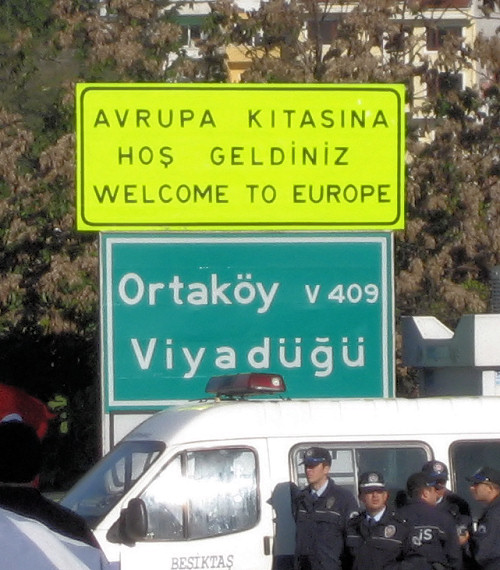
"Welcome to Europe" sign on Istanbul's Bosphorus Bridge during the 28th Eurasia Marathon in 2006

The Istanbul Marathon (Turkish: İstanbul Maratonu, also known as Türkiye İş Bankası Istanbul Marathon for sponsorship reasons) is an international athletics event hosted in Istanbul, Turkey, in November, first held in 1979. It is the only marathon in the world whose course spans two continents, Asia and Europe. (Note: A marathon in Yekaterinburg, Russia, the Europe-Asia International Marathon, also claims to cross the border between Europe and Asia.)

The three race categories for men and women are: marathon, 15 km and public run. A special category for disabled persons exists also. Participation in the public run in 1998 was 150,000 people, a record.

The event is organised by Istanbul Sports Events, which also hosts the annual Istanbul Half Marathon in April.

== History ==
The Istanbul marathon has previously been known as "Vodafone Istanbul Marathon" as well as "Intercontinental Istanbul Eurasia Marathon".

In 1997, Moges Taye of Ethiopia set the course record for men at the time of 2:13:37.

In 2005, Madina Biktagirova of Russia set the course record for women at the time of 2:34:25.

In 2006, Madina Biktagirova broke her own course record for women from the previous year with 2:28:21, and the course record for men was broken by the Lithuanian athlete Mindaugas Pukstas in 2:12:52. Also, for the first time in 2006, time keeping for marathon and 15 km was effected by means of a single-use chip, which was placed on the athlete's shoe tied by shoelaces. An athlete without this so-called champion-chip would not receive an official time. In addition, the Istanbul Eurasia Marathon that year incorporated the 4th European Police Marathon Championships for the first time, which contributed to top results.

In 2012, the month the marathon was generally held was changed from October to November. That year, the 34th edition of the marathon was named "Vodafone Istanbul Eurasia Marathon". Also that year, because the marathon had become a significant marathon event, it was awarded IAAF Gold Label status.

In 2013, around 20,000 local and foreigner athletes participated at the road race in different categories, among them wheelchair runners. The event saw also for the first time security measures concerning the bridge stability. Two years before, the running crowd on the Bosphorus Bridge caused dangerous instability by self-induced vibrations in the structure which could result in its failure. Influenced by this lesson, several start times with ten minutes intervals were held after the first start, which took place on 9:30 hours. The groups were not allowed to run on the bridge rather than to walk only. In order to avoid stopping for taking pictures, the outmost lanes of the bridge were blocked by barriers.

== Course ==
External images
- Course map of full marathon in 2020
- Course map of full marathon in 2021

The course is asphalt, mostly flat and is free of traffic. It is the only course in the world where the marathon includes two continents, Asia and Europe, in one race.

The marathon starts on the Asian side of the city, shortly before the First Bosphorus Bridge, crosses the bridge giving an outstanding view of the Bosphorus and Istanbul, passes many historic sites including the Blue Mosque and Hagia Sophia, and ends in the İnönü Stadium in the European part. In all, the race crosses three bridges, one over the Bosporus and two over the Golden Horn. The course changed three times over the years, therefore winning scores differ.

In 2020, during the coronavirus pandemic, the course was altered to begin and end in Yenikapı and cross the Bosphorus Bridge twice, so runners would start and finish the marathon in Europe, but both enter and exit Asia during the run.

== Qualification ==
To register for the marathon, participants must be 18 years of age or older on the race day.

In 2020, due to the coronavirus pandemic, athletes over the age of 65 were disallowed from participating in the marathon.

== Prizes ==
Money prizes are given to the first 25 male athletes and 15 best female athletes in the marathon category, the first 3 ranks receiving US$35,000, US$15,000 and US$10,000 respectively. An athlete, who broke the course record, is awarded with a bonus of US$5,000. Bonuses exists also for times run between 2:14:00 and 2:04:55 or better for men and between 2:33:00 and 2:15:25 or better for women, scaled from US$500 up to US$100,000. Prizes are also provided for the best ranking athletes in other competition categories.

In 2013, the total amount of the money prizes was US$1 million.

== Winners ==
Key: Course record (in bold)

Ed.	Year	Men's winner	Time	Women's winner	Time	Rf.
1	1979	Hasan Saylam (TUR)	2:35:40	winner data not available		
2	1980	Necmettin Sağlam (TUR)	2:36:00	winner data not available		
3	1981	Süleyman Sılacı (TUR)	2:31:40	winner data not available		
4	1982	İsmail Karagöz (TUR)	2:41:13	winner data not available		
5	1983	Ian Thompson (GBR)	2:32:35	winner data not available		
6	1984	Mehmet Yurdadön (TUR)	2:22:30	winner data not available		
7	1985	Mehmet Terzi (TUR)	2:12:50	winner data not available		
8	1986	Hanifi Atmaca (TUR)	2:23:20	winner data not available		
9	1987	Jens Wørzner (DEN)	2:16:08	Fatma Erkan (TUR)	3:08:36	
10	1988	Ahmet Altun (TUR)	2:15:06	Keriman Günaydin (TUR)	3:12:35	
11	1989	Aydın Çeken (TUR)	2:27:41	winner data not available		
12	1990	Gazi Aşıkoğlu (TUR)	2:23:09	Ayşegül Battal (TUR)	3:46:24	
13	1991	Terry Mitchell (GBR)	2:22:09	Jacqueline Davis (GBR)	2:49:24	
14	1992	Cihangir Demirel (TUR)	2:23:28	Aurica Buia (ROM)	2:46:29	
15	1993	Jacob Ngunzu (KEN)	2:20:43	Yelena Sipatova (RUS)	2:48:10	
16	1994	Bigboy Goromonzi (ZIM)	2:24:58	Serap Aktaş (TUR)	2:46:42	
17	1995	Stephen Langat (KEN)	2:17:56	Firaya Sultanova (RUS)	2:34:44	
18	1996	Stephen Langat (KEN)	2:18:51	Elena Plastinina (UKR)	2:37:38	
19	1997	Moges Taye (ETH)	2:13:37	Adriana Barbu (ROM)	2:34:39	
20	1998	Moges Taye (ETH)	2:15:28	Natalya Galushko (BLR)	2:38:10	
21	1999	Moges Taye (ETH)	2:13:58	Adriana Barbu (ROM)	2:35:57	
22	2000	Josephat Rop (KEN)	2:17:03	Rodica Chiriţă (ROM)	2:37:39	
23	2001	Bedaso Turbe (ETH)	2:18:21	Lyudmyla Pushkina (UKR)	2:38:21	
24	2002	David Chepkwony (KEN)	2:18:42	Rimma Dubovik (UKR)	2:37:20	
25	2003	Belaye Wolashe (ETH)	2:18:29	Rimma Dubovik (UKR)	2:36:49	
26	2004	David Chepkwony (KEN)	2:18:19	Svetlana Demidenko (RUS)	2:36:44	
27	2005	Joseph Mbithi (KEN)	2:15:13	Madina Biktagirova (RUS)	2:34:25	
28	2006	Mindaugas Pukštas (LTU)	2:12:52	Madina Biktagirova (RUS)	2:28:21	
29	2007	David Cheruiyot (KEN)	2:11:00	Atsede Baysa (ETH)	2:29:08	
30	2008	Kasine Adilo (ETH)	2:11:16	Nailiya Yulamanova (RUS)	2:30:17	
31	2009	Kasine Adilo (ETH)	2:12:14	Bizunesh Urgesa (ETH)	2:32:45	
32	2010	Vincent Kiplagat (KEN)	2:10:42	Ashu Kasim (ETH)	2:27:27	
33	2011	Vincent Kiplagat (KEN)	2:10:58	Alemitu Abera (ETH)	2:27:56	
34	2012	Stephen Chebogut (KEN)	2:11:05	Koren Jelela (ETH)	2:28:06	
35	2013	Siraj Gena (ETH)	2:13:19	Rebecca Chesire (KEN)	2:29:05	
36	2014	Gebo Burka (ETH)	2:12:23	Amane Gobena (ETH)	2:28:46	
37	2015	Elias Chelimo (KEN)	2:11:17	Amane Gobena (ETH)	2:31:58	
38	2016	Evans Kiplagat (AZE)	2:13:30	Agnes Barsosio (KEN)	2:28:25	
39	2017	Abraham Kiprotich (FRA)	2:11:22	Ruth Chepngetich (KEN)	2:22:36	
40	2018	Felix Kimutai (KEN)	2:09:57	Ruth Chepngetich (KEN)	**2:18:35**	
41	2019	Daniel Kibet (KEN)	2:09:44	Hirut Tibebu (ETH)	2:23:40	
42	2020	Benard Cheruiyot (KEN)	2:11:49	Diana Kipyokei (KEN)	2:22:06	
43	2021	Victor Kiplangat (UGA)	2:10:18	Sheila Jerotich (KEN)	2:24:15	
44	2022	Robert Kipkemboi (KEN)	2:10:16	Sechale Dalasa (ETH)	2:25:53	
45	2023	Panuel Mkungo (KEN)	2:10:35	Beatrice Cheptoo (KEN)	2:27:09	
46	2024	Dejene Debela (ETH)	2:11:40	Ruth Jebet (BHR)	2:24:45	
47	2025	Rhonzas Kilimo (KEN)	2:10:12	Bizuager Aderra (ETH)	2:26:19	
48	2026	Philimon Kiptoo Kipchumba (KEN)	**2:08:45**	Kasanesh Ayenew Baze (ETH)	2:24:41	

=== By country ===
Country	Men's race	Women's race	Total
Kenya	19	7	26
Ethiopia	10	11	21
Turkey	11	4	15
Russia	0	6	6
Romania	0	4	4
Ukraine	0	4	4
United Kingdom	2	1	3
Azerbaijan	1	0	1
Denmark	1	0	1
France	1	0	1
Lithuania	1	0	1
Zimbabwe	1	0	1
Uganda	1	0	1
Belarus	0	1	1
Bahrain	0	1	1

== Recent results ==
2026

48th marathon was held on November 1, 2026

- Overall
1. (Kenya) Philimon Kiptoo Kipchumba 2:08:45 CRM
2. (Ethiopia) Sufaro Woliyi 2:08:55
3. (Kenya) Vincent Ronoh 2:08:58
- Women's
1. (Ethiopia) Kasanesh Baze 2:24:41
2. (Ethiopia) Azmera Abreha 2:24:48
3. (Ethiopia) Diribe Hirko 2:25:01

2025

47th marathon was held on November 2, 2025

- Overall
1. (Kenya) Rhonzas Lokitam Kilimo 2:10:12
2. (Ethiopia) Dejene Debela 2:10:23
3. (Ethiopia) Sufaro Woliyi 2:10:26
- Women's
1. (Ethiopia) Bizuager Aderra 2:26:19
2. (Ethiopia) Sofia Assefa 2:26:21
3. (Kenya) Joan Kilimo 2:26:36

2024

46th marathon was held on November 3, 2024

- Overall
1. (Ethiopia) Dejene Debela 2:11:40
2. (Kenya) Mathew Samperu 2:11:55
3. (Kenya) Kenneth Kiprop Kipkemoi 2:12:07
- Women's
1. (Bahrain) Ruth Jebet 2:24:45
2. (Ethiopia) Urge Diro 2:33:37
3. (Ethiopia) Ayantu Gemechu 2:33:49

2023

45th marathon was held on November 5, 2023

- Overall
1. (Kenya) Panuel Mkungo 2:10:35
2. (Kenya) Bernard Sang 2:12:41
3. (Kenya) James Kiplagat 2:12:44
- Women's
1. (Kenya) Beatrice Cheptoo 2:27:09
2. (Kenya) Veronica Maina 2:27:24
3. (Kenya) Valentine Chepkwemoi Mateiko 2:32:15

2022

44th marathon was held on November 6, 2022

- Overall
1. (Kenya) Robert Kipkemboi 2:10:18
2. (Bahrain) Marius Kimutai 2:10:27
3. (Kenya) Sila Kiptoo 2:11:42
- Women's
1. (Ethiopia) Sechale Dalasa 2:25:54
2. (Ethiopia) Tsegaye Melesech 2:29:01
3. (Ethiopia) Ethlemahu Sintayehu 2:31:38

2021

43th marathon was held on November 7, 2021

- Overall
1. (Uganda) Victor Kiplangat 2:10:18
2. (Kenya) Robert Kipkemboi 2:10:23
3. (Uganda) Solomon Mutai 2:10:25
- Women's
1. (Kenya) Sheila Jerotich 2:24:15
2. (Kenya) Jackline Chepngeno 2:24:21
3. (Ethiopia) Ayantu Gemechu 2:24:45

2020

42th marathon was held on November 8, 2020

- Overall
1. (Kenya) Bernard Sang 2:11:49
2. (Kenya) Felix Kimutai 2:12:00
3. (Ethiopia) Hailu Zewdu 2:12:23
- Women's
1. (Kenya) Diana Chemtai Kipyokei 2:22:06
2. (Ethiopia) Hiwot Gebrekidan 2:24:30
3. (Ethiopia) Tigist Memuye 2:37:52

2019

41th marathon was held on November 3, 2019

- Overall
1. (Kenya) Daniel Kibet 2:09:44 CRM
2. (Ethiopia) Yitayal Atnafu Zerihun 2:09:57
3. (Kenya) Felix Kimutai 2:10:50
- Women's
1. (Ethiopia) Hirut Tibebu 2:23:40
2. (Ethiopia) Tigist Abayechew 2:24:15
3. (Kenya) Maurine Chepkemoi 2:24:16

2018

40th marathon was held on November 11, 2018

- Overall
1. (Kenya) Felix Kimutai 2:09:57 CRM
2. (Bahrain) Abdi Ibrahim Abdo 2:10:37
3. (France) Abraham Kiprotich 2:10:55
- Women's
1. (Kenya) Ruth Chepngetich 2:18:35 CRW
2. (Kenya) Margaret Agai 2:25:04
3. (Ethiopia) Fatuma Sado 2:31:05

2017

39th marathon was held on November 12, 2017

- Overall
1. (France) Abraham Kiprotich 2:11:22
2. (Kenya) Jacob Kendagor 2:11:27
3. (Ethiopia) Bazu Worku 2:11:39
- Women's
1. (Kenya) Ruth Chepngetich 2:22:36 CRW
2. (Kenya) Visiline Jepkesho 2:22:40
3. (Ethiopia) Letebrhan Haylay 2:25:14

2016

38th marathon was held on November 13, 2016

- Overall
1. (Azerbaijan) Evans Kiplagat Barkowet 2:13:28
2. (Ethiopia) Shura Kitata Tola 2:14:08
3. (Kenya) Peter Kiptoo Kiplagat 2:14:33
- Women's
1. (Kenya) Agnes Jeruto Barsosio 2:28:23
2. (Ethiopia) Sechale Dalasa Adugna 2:33:36
3. (Ethiopia) Rahma Tusa Chota 2:33:43

2015

37th marathon was held on November 15, 2015.

- Overall
1. (Kenya) Eliaz Kemboi Chelimo 2:11:17
2. (Kenya) Evans Kiplagat 2:12:51
3. (Kenya) Sliah Kipkemboi Limo 2:14:02
- Women's
1. (Ethiopia) Amane Gobena Gemeda 2:31:54
2. (Ethiopia) Zerfie Limeneh Tadese 2:40:47
3. (Turkey) Meryem Erdoğan 2:46:37

Prize money (both for men and women):

- Winners: US$50,000
- Runner-up: US$25,000
- Third place: US$15,000

2014

36th marathon was held on November 16, 2014.

- Overall
1. (Morocco) Hafid Chani 2:11:53
2. (Ethiopia) Gebo Burka 2:12:23
3. (Kenya) Michael Kiprop 2:12:39
- Women's
1. (Ethiopia) Amane Gobena 2:28:47
2. (Ethiopia) Salomie Getnet 2:30:38
3. (Ukraine) Olena Burkovska 2:31:32

Prize money (both for men and women):
- Winners: US$50,000
- Runner-up: US$25,000
- Third place: US$15,000

Wheelchair runners:

- Winners: US$5,000
- Runner-up: US$3,000
- Third place: US$2,000

2013

35th marathon was held on November 17, 2013.

- Overall
1. (Ethiopia) Siraj Gena Amda 2:13:19
2. (Kenya) Evans Kiplagat 2:14:43
3. (Ethiopia) Ketema Tadesse 2:14:52
- Women's
1. (Kenya) Rebecca Chesire 2:29:05
2. (Turkey) Elvan Abeylegesse 2:29:30
3. (Turkey) Sultan Haydar 2:29:40

NB Original race winner Abraham Kiprotich was disqualified for a doping offence.

Prize money (both for men and women):
- Winners: US$50,000
- Runner-up: US$25,000
- Third place: US$15,000

Wheelchair runners:

- Winners: US$5,000
- Runner-up: US$3,000
- Third place: US$2,000

2012

34th marathon was held on November 11, 2012.

- Overall
1. (Kenya) Stephen Chebogut 2:11:05
2. (Kenya) Kiprotich Yegon 2:15:35
3. (Kenya) Evans Kiplagat 2:16:43
- Women's
1. (Ethiopia) Koren Jelela Yal 2:28:06
2. (Ethiopia) Amane Gobena 2:28:38
3. (Turkey) Sultan Haydar 2:29:41

2011

33rd marathon was held on October 16, 2011.

- Overall
1. (Kenya) Vincent Kiplagat 2:10:58
2. (Ethiopia) Tariku Jufar 2:11:31
3. (Ethiopia) Tsegay Gebreselassie 2:13:39
- Women's
1. (Ethiopia) Alemitu Abera 2:27:56
2. (Ethiopia) Fatuma Sado 2:28:01
3. (Ethiopia) Tsega Gelaw 2:28:38

2010

32nd marathon was held on October 17, 2010.

- Overall
1. (Kenya) Vincent Kiplagat 2:10:39
2. (Kenya) Dereje Yadete Wolde-Giorgis 2:11:53
3. (Ethiopia) Girma Assefa 2:13:37
- Women's
1. (Ethiopia) Ashu Kasim Rabo 2:27:25 CRW
2. (Ethiopia) Alemitu Abera 2:27:54
3. (Ethiopia) Amane Gobena 2.32:28

2009

31st marathon was held on October 18, 2009.

- Overall
1. (Ethiopia) Kasime Adilo Roba 2:12:14
2. (Qatar) Faisal Bader Shebto 2:12:54
3. (Kenya) Joseph Kahugu 2:13:32
- Women's
1. (Ethiopia) Bizunesh Urgesa 2.32.45
2. (Ethiopia) Ashu Kasim Rabo 2.34.54
3. (Russia) Svetlana Semova 2.37.04

Awards:

- Winner men's: US$50,000
- Winner women's: US$50,000

2008

30th marathon was held on October 26, 2008.

- Overall
1. (Ethiopia) Kasime Adilo Roba 2:11:16 CRM ^{†})
2. (Ethiopia) Lishan Yigezu Fanta 2:11:37
3. (Moldova) Iaroslav Muşinschi 2:11:43
- Women's
1. (Russia) Nailya Yulamanova 2:30:17
2. (Russia) Yuliya Gromova 2:31:36
3. (Turkey) Mehtap Sızmaz 2:33:17

^{†}) Course changed

Prize money:

- Winner men's: US$60,000
- Winner women's: US$60,000
- Course record: US$10,000
- World record: US$100,000

2007

29th marathon was held on October 28, 2007.
Motto: "Sağlıklı Çevre, Sağlıklı Nesiller, Yaşanabilir Bir Kent" (Healthy Environment, Healthy Generations)

- Overall
1. (Kenya) David Emmanuel Cheruiyot 2:10:56 CRM
2. (Kenya) Mark Windot Yatich 2:11:02
3. (Ethiopia) Tariku Jufar 2:11:04
- Women's
1. (Ethiopia) Atsede Baysa 2:29:05
2. (Poland) Małgorzata Sobańska 2:31:08
3. (Russia) Olga Glok 2:31:10

Awards:

- Winner men's: US$60,000
- Winner women's: US$60,000
- Course record: US$10,000
- World record: US$100,000

2006

28th marathon was held on November 5, 2006.
Motto: "Sigarasız Bir Dünya İçin Koşuyoruz" (Smoke-Free World)

- Overall
1. (Lithuania) Mindaugas Pukstas 2:12:52 FCRM
2. (Ukraine) Andriy Naumov 2:12:59
3. (Russia) Sergey Lukin 2:13:08
- Women's
1. (Russia) Madina Biktagirova 2:28:21 CRW
2. (Russia) Liliya Yadzhak 2:29:22
3. (Russia) Natalya Volgina 2:30:07

2005

27th marathon was held on October 2, 2005.

- Overall
1. (Kenya) Joseph Mbithi 2:15:13
2. (Kenya) Hillary Koech Kipkering 2:15:47
3. (Kenya) Benson Mutisya Mbithi 2:16:07
- Women's
1. (Russia) Madina Biktagirova 2:34:25 FCRW
2. (Russia) Natalia Volgina 2:36:42
3. (Russia) Zhanna Malkova 2:37:33

2004

26th marathon was held on October 10, 2004.

- Overall
1. (Kenya) David Kiptanui 2:18:19
2. (Russia) Konstantin Permitin 2:18:25
3. (Ukraine) Yuriy Hychun 2:18:35
- Women's
1. (Russia) Svetlana Demidenko 2:36:44
2. (Russia) Zhanna Malkova 2:39:36
3. (Russia) Olga Glok 2:42:45

2003

25th marathon was held on October 19, 2003.

- Overall
1. (Ethiopia) Belay Wolashe 2:18:29
2. (Russia) Oleg Strijakov 2:18:48
3. (Ethiopia) Bedasso Turbe 2:18:54
- Women's
1. (Ukraine) Rima Dubovik 2:36:49
2. (Russia) Svetlana Demidenko 2:38:34
3. (Russia) Irina Safarova 2:39:41

2002

24th marathon was held on October 27, 2002.

- Overall
1. (Kenya) David Kiptanui 2:18:42
2. (South Africa) Frans Chauke 2:18:51
3. (Ethiopia) Belay Wolashe 2:19:37
- Women's
1. (Ukraine) Rima Dubovik 2:37:20
2. (Moldova) Svetlana Tkach 2:37:57
3. (Russia) Irina Permitina 2:40:50

2001

23rd marathon was held on October 11, 2001.

- Overall
1. (Ethiopia) Bedasso Turbe 2:18:21
2. (Serbia and Montenegro) Sreten Ninković 2:18:22
3. (Morocco) Erraoui Mohammad 2:18:35
- Women's
1. (Ukraine) Lyudmyla Pushkina 2:38:21
2. (Turkey) Mehtap Sızmaz 2:39:13
3. (Bulgaria) Milka Mihailova 2:40:39

2000

22nd marathon was held on October 14, 2000.

- Overall
1. (Kenya) Rop Josephat 2:17:03
2. (Ethiopia) Moges Taye 2:18:21
3. (South Africa) Frans Chauke 2:18:43
- Women's
1. (Romania) Adriana Chirita 2:37:39
2. (Romania) Constantina Diţă 2:37:57
3. (Belarus) Natalia Galshko 2:38:17

- CRM Course record Men's
- CRW Course record Women's
- FCRM Former Course record Men's
- FCRW Former Course record Women's

== Notable participants ==
- (United Kingdom) Ian Thompson in 1983
- (Turkey) Mehmet Terzi in 1985
- (United Kingdom) Terry Mitchell in 1991 and 1992
- (Turkey) Elvan Abeylegesse in 2013
