= Kenai Kiprotich Kenei =

Kenyan long-distance runner

Kenai Kiprotich Kenei (born 1978) is a male long-distance runner from Kenya. He set his personal best (2:07:42) in the men's marathon on April 29, 2007, finishing third in the Hamburg Marathon.

== Achievements ==
Year	Competition	Venue	Position	Event	Notes
Representing Kenya
2003	Venice Marathon	Venice, Italy	12th	Marathon	2:19:39
2006	Paris Marathon	Paris, France	2nd	Marathon	2:08:51
2007	Hamburg Marathon	Hamburg, Germany	3rd	Marathon	2:07.42
2007	Beijing Marathon	Beijing, PR China	7th	Marathon	2:14:30
2008	Xiamen International Marathon	Xiamen, PR China	1st	Marathon	2:09:49
2008	Hamburg Marathon	Hamburg, Germany	8th	Marathon	2:10.33
2008	Seoul Marathon	Seoul, South Korea	8th	Marathon	2:11.21
2009	Daegu Marathon	Daegu, South Korea	2nd	Marathon	2:10:00
2010	Xiamen International Marathon	Xiamen, PR China	4th	Marathon	2:10:46
