= Dawit Wolde =

Ethiopian middle-distance runner

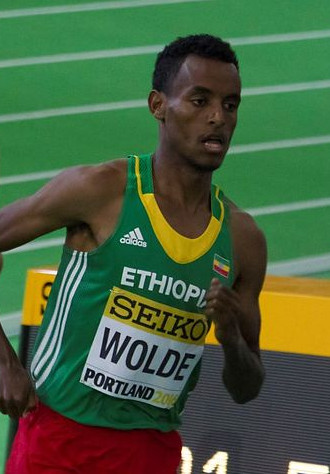
Dawit Wolde in 2016

Dawit Wolde (born 19 May 1991) is an Ethiopian middle-distance runner who specialises in the 1500 metres. A medallist at the World Youth Championships and the African Junior Athletics Championships, he has represented Ethiopia at the African Championships in Athletics and the All-Africa Games. He was chosen to compete at the 2012 Summer Olympics and 2016 Olympics. His 1500 m personal best is 3:33.82 minutes. As of July 2025, he is ranked at 38 in the Men's Marathon & 339th in the Men's Overall Ranking. His personal best world ranking positions have been 6th place in the Men's Marathon, 19th place n Men's 5000m, 111th place in Men's 10,000m & 107th place in Men's Overall Ranking.

== Career ==
Born in Debre Zeyit in Ethiopia's Oromia Region, he came to international prominence as a teenager with a bronze medal at the 2007 World Youth Championships in Athletics and a silver at the 2007 African Junior Athletics Championships. He set a personal best of 3:41.25 minutes for the 1500 m that year at the Meeting Iberoamericano. He ran at the 2008 World Junior Championships in Athletics but was eliminated in the first round.

Dawit knocked nearly five seconds off his best in 2009. He won the Josef Odlozil Memorial 1500 m, took bronze at the 2009 African Junior Athletics Championships, and closed the season with a best of 3:36.74 minutes at the Shanghai Golden Grand Prix. A third-place finish in the 800 metres at the 2010 Ethiopian Athletics Championships led to an appearance in that event at the 2010 African Championships in Athletics, where he was a semi-finalist. He had top three finishes on the 2011 European track and field circuit, highlighted by a run of 3:34.13 minutes in Oordegem. He was a 1500 m finalist at the 2011 All-Africa Games, but did not finish in the final.

He had a successful debut over the half marathon distance at the 2012 Egmond Half Marathon, breaking a thirteen-year-old course record with a time of 60:46 minutes. He was less successful at the Prague Half Marathon, coming eighth, but his 1500 m performances improved: he ran 3:33.82 minutes at the FBK Games and set a mile run best of 3:57.48 minutes at the Prefontaine Classic. As the second fastest Ethiopian that season, he was chosen for the Ethiopian team for the 2012 London Olympics.

In 2015 he competed at the World Championship in the 1500 m.

In 2016, he reached the final of the 1500 m at the World Indoor Championship, finishing in 5th place. That year, he also reached the semifinals of the 1500m at the 2016 Olympics.

In 2025, he set a course record to win the C&D Xiamen Marathon, recognised as a World Athletics Platinum Label road race, securing the title with a time of 2:06:06. He also won the 2025 Gifu Seiryu Half Marathon, a World Athletics Gold Label event, clocking a time of 1:00:06.

== Personal bests ==
- 800 metres: 1:48.92 min (2015)
- 1500 metres: 3:33.82 min (2012)
- Mile run: 3:54.02 min (2016)
- 3000 metres: 7:42.65 min (2011)
- Half marathon: 59.58 min (2020)
- Marathon: 2:03.48 min (2023)
