= Abraham Kiprotich =

Kenyan-French long-distance runner (born 1985)

Personal information
- Born: 17 August 1985 (age 41) Kapnyeberai, Kenya
- Height: 1.77 m (5 ft 10 in)
- Weight: 62 kg (137 lb)

Sport
- Country: France
- Sport: Athletics
- Event: Marathon

Abraham Kiprotich (born 17 August 1985) is a Kenyan-French long-distance runner. At the 2012 Summer Olympics, he competed in the Men's marathon but did not finish.

Born in Kenya's Nandi County, when Kiprotich was just two years old his older brother, Paul Kipkoech, won the gold medal in the 10,000 metres at the 1987 World Championships in Athletics. Kipkoech died before Kiprotich had even reached his teenage years. Kiprotich started out as a track runner and in 2005 he set personal bests of 8:03.25 minutes for the 3000 metres, 13:59.63 minutes for the 5000 metres, as well as a road best of 29:43 minutes for the 10K run. He took up the 3000 metres steeplechase and gradually improved over the following years to achieve a personal best of 8:36.00 minutes in 2008. That year he also won the 10 km de Clermont Ferrand in a personal best time of 28:41 minutes. Another best time of 28:29 minutes came in winning the 10 km event at the Lille Half Marathon.

Kiprotich began running longer distances in 2010 and finished in the top eight at the Boulogne-Billancourt Half Marathon and the Marseille-Cassis Classique Internationale. Having served in the French Foreign Legion and lived in the country for several years, Kiprotich gained French citizenship and began to compete for his adopted nation. He made a career breakthrough at the 2012 Düsseldorf Marathon, running a time of 2:08:35 to finish eight seconds behind the winner and placed third. He was the second ranked French runner after fellow African-born marathoner Patrick Tambwé and was selected for the 2012 Summer Olympics. However, he failed to finish at the Men's Olympic Marathon, as did his compatriots Tambwé and Abdellatif Meftah.

He finished outside the top ten at the 2013 Tiberias Marathon but he topped the podium at the Daegu Marathon on 14 April 2013, beating Boniface Mvubi to win in a personal best of 2:08:33 hours. On 17 November 2013 he won the Istanbul Marathon with a time of 2:12:28. On 10 February 2018 he won the Lagos Marathon, finishing the race in a time of 2 hours, 13 minutes and 4 seconds.

== Doping Case ==
On 30 December 2013 it was announced that Kiprotich had failed a drug test directly after his Istanbul Marathon win, having returned a positive result for erythropoietin (EPO) in a urine sample. The leading French sports journal l'Equipe reported that this adverse finding, which related to his 'A' sample, surprised no-one, and would confirm - if the 'B' sample also proved positive - a suspicion in French athletic circles that Kiprotich was the athlete referred to on 17 April 2013 at a French senatorial anti-doping enquiry, when the president and technical director of the Fédération Française d'Athlétisme both noted that a French marathon runner who had won in Daegu had competed while subject to a two-week suspension for breaches of their medical surveillance regime.

The positive test was subsequently confirmed by the B sample. Kiprotich was stripped of his Istanbul Marathon title and given a two-year ban from competition.
