= Columbus Marathon =

Marathon held in Columbus, Ohio, US

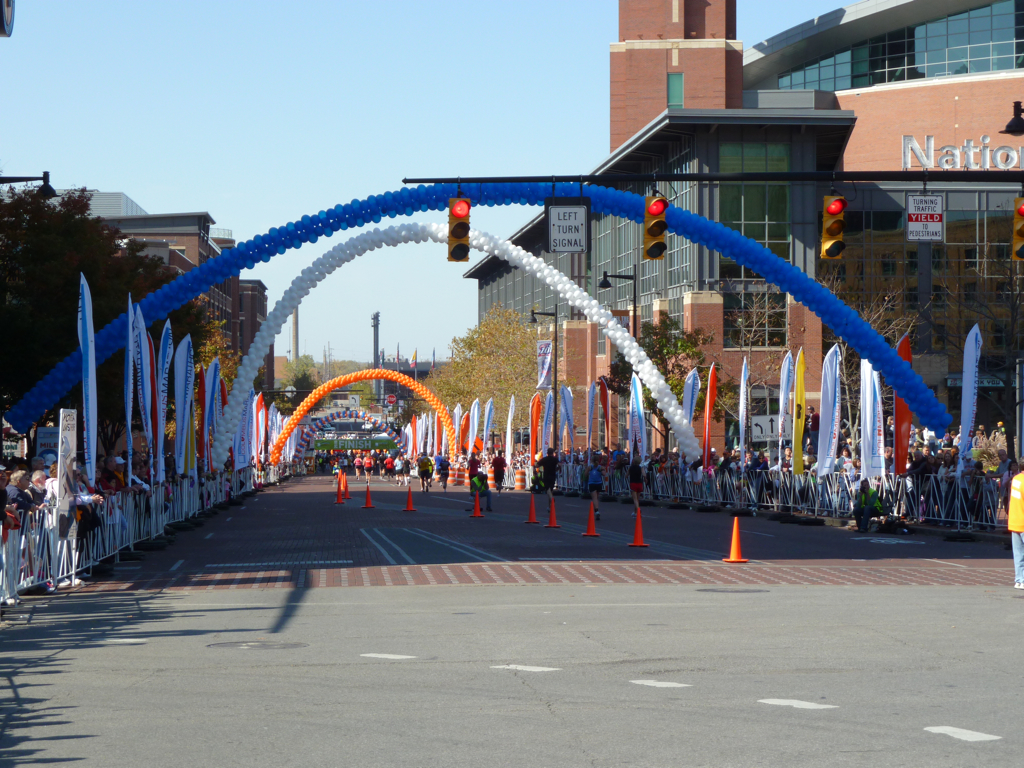
- Marathon finish line in 2010
- Date: Third Sunday in October
- Location: Columbus, Ohio
- Event type: Road
- Distance: Marathon; 26.2 mi (42.2 km) or 13.1 mi (half marathon)
- Primary sponsor: Nationwide Children's Hospital
- Beneficiary: Nationwide Children's Hospital
- Established: 1980
- Course records: Men: 2:11:02 (1980); Tommy Persson; Women: 2:28:15 (2003); Lyudmyla Pushkina
- Website: www.columbusmarathon.com

The Nationwide Children's Hospital Columbus Marathon is a marathon held in Columbus, Ohio, United States. First run in 1978 and held annually since 1980, it features a flat, fast course which saw nearly 20 percent of finishers qualify for the Boston Marathon in 2010. The event has sold-out in mid-August every year since 2018. There are 7,000 runners in the full marathon and 11,000 in the half marathon, making it one of the largest running events in the United States. Proceeds go to Nationwide Children's Hospital. 2023 marks the twelfth year of this partnership; so far more than $12 million has been raised for the Hospital. This includes more than $1 million contributed since 2012 by the Columbus Marathon Board of Directors.

== History ==
The concept of the Columbus Marathon was the brainchild of former Mayors Tom Moody and Greg Lashutka as a way to put Columbus on the map and showcase the city at the same time. The inaugural race was held on June 4, 1978. The 1980 race, on November 16, hosted 2,500 runners. Tommy Persson of Sweden set a course record of 2:11:02 that year which remains unbroken (as of 2025). The female record was set in 2003 by Lyudmyla Pushkina of Ukraine with a time of 2:28:15.

The 2020 edition of the race was cancelled due to the coronavirus pandemic, with all registrants automatically receiving full refunds.

Every year, the Columbus Marathon gives out the "spirit award" to people who "have inspired others by their efforts to overcome obstacles or challenges to take part in our race or represented the event in a positive way."

== Course ==
The cloverleaf design of the course also makes it easy for spectators to see their athletes at several different points – all within a block walking distance. The course begins in downtown Columbus and takes athletes east through Bexley, Ohio, past the Governor's Mansion and Capital University; back through the historic Franklin Park Neighborhood and the festive neighborhood of Old Town East; south through German Village; up High Street through downtown Columbus and the Short North Arts District; a jaunt through Ohio State University, including past The Oval and through Ohio Stadium, home of the football Buckeyes, and through Upper Arlington, through the tree-lined streets of Victorian Village and back to a huge crowd awaiting finishers outside Nationwide Arena in the Arena District.

== Event records ==
- Male Marathon: Tommy Persson of Sweden in 2:11:02 – 1980
- Female Marathon: Lyudmyla Pushkina of Ukraine, 2:28:15 – 2003
- Male ½ Marathon: James Ngandu of Kenya in 1:02:14 - 2019
- Female ½ Marathon: Vicoty Chepngeno of Kenya in 1:10:24 - 2019
- Male Wheelchair: Ernst Van Dyk of South Africa in 1:26:47 – 2003
- Female Wheelchair: Jean Driscoll of Illinois in 1:51:08 – 1993
- Male Hand Cycle: Dane Pilon, Fayetteville, NC in 1:10:47–2010
- Female Hand Cycle: Dianna Johnson of Indiana in 2:26:22 – 2008

== Olympics qualification ==
More than 50 Olympians have run in Columbus, including the 1980 men's Silver Medalist, Gerard Nigboer, 1984 Women's Gold Medalist, Joan Benoit, 1984 Men's Fourth Place Finisher, Joseph Nzau and 1984 Women's 6th Place Finisher, Priscilla Welch. In 1983, seven women qualified for the Women's U.S. Olympic Trials event, six of them were from the state of Ohio. The top 10 males also qualified for their Olympic Trials events. Seven of them men ran in the 1984 Olympics for their respective countries. The following year, eight Olympians competed in the Columbus Marathon. In 1992, 109 of the country's top runners came to Columbus. Only 3 would qualify for the team and their quest for a medal at the Summer Olympics: Steve Spence, Ed Eyestone, and Bob Kempainen.

Since then, more and more athletes have come to Columbus to qualify for the Olympic Marathon Trials.

== Designations ==
The Columbus Marathon has been designated by Runner's World as one of the Top 20 marathons in the nation and by USA Today as one of the top 10 Fall marathons.

== Race directors ==
- Mike VanBuskirk (1980–1981)
- Bill Dejong (1982)
- Doug Thurston (1992–1994)
- Joan Riegel (1995–1999)
- Mike Collins (1983–1991; 2000–2005)
- Scott Weaver (2006–2009)
- Darris Blackford (2010 – Present)
