= Carlsbad Marathon =

California marathon

The Carlsbad Marathon started out as the San Diego Marathon. It is said to be one of the oldest races on the West Coast. In 1978, The Heart of San Diego Marathon was created, and thus there were two marathons in San Diego. When InMotion Inc. was hired to put on the marathon, the decision was made to combine the two marathons, and eventually the marathon was moved from San Diego to Carlsbad.

== About the Marathon and Half Marathon ==
The Carlsbad Marathon and Half Marathon are winter races that takes place in the small beach town of Carlsbad, California in January. Carlsbad is part of North San Diego County. The race offers runners views of the Pacific Ocean as they run down the coast. Participants run through the small and affluent beach community of Carlsbad Village and along the beaches and lagoons that make up Highway 101. Both the marathon and half marathon start and finish at the Westfield Carlsbad, located at 2525 El Camino Real, Carlsbad, CA 92008.

There is a time limit in place for both races. Runners have 6 hours total to complete the full marathon and 4 hours to complete the half. Those runners that participate in the full marathon will be eligible for the SoCal Triple Crown once they have finished the race. The other two races they must complete include the GOVX San Diego Half Marathon and 5k and America's Finest City Half Marathon and 5K.

During the event weekend, participants can also chose the Double Down Challenge, where they complete the 5K and half marathon for a total of 16.2 miles.

In 2026, Andres Aguilar, a runner from San Antonio, Texas, collapsed at the half marathon finish line and later died at the hospital from a suspected cardiac event.
