= Prague Marathon =

Annual race in Czechia since 1995

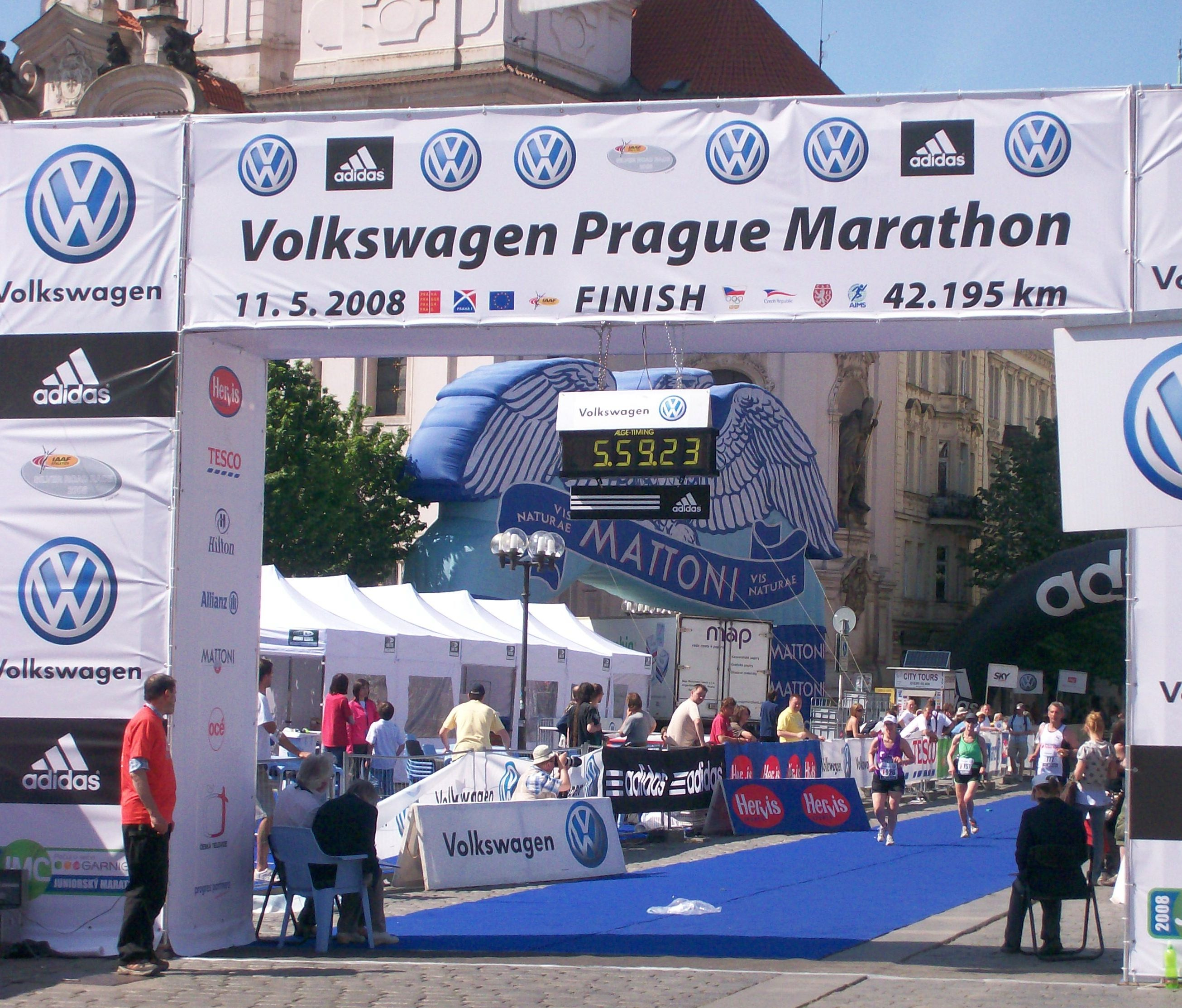
- Finish line outside St. Nicholas Church in 2008
- Date: May
- Location: Prague, Czech Republic
- Event type: Road
- Distance: Marathon
- Established: 1995 (31 years ago)
- Course records: Men's: 2:05:09 (2023) (Kenya) Alexander Mutiso; Women's: 2:19:46 (2019) (Israel) Lonah Chemtai
- Website: Prague Marathon
- Participants: 7,631 finishers (2025)

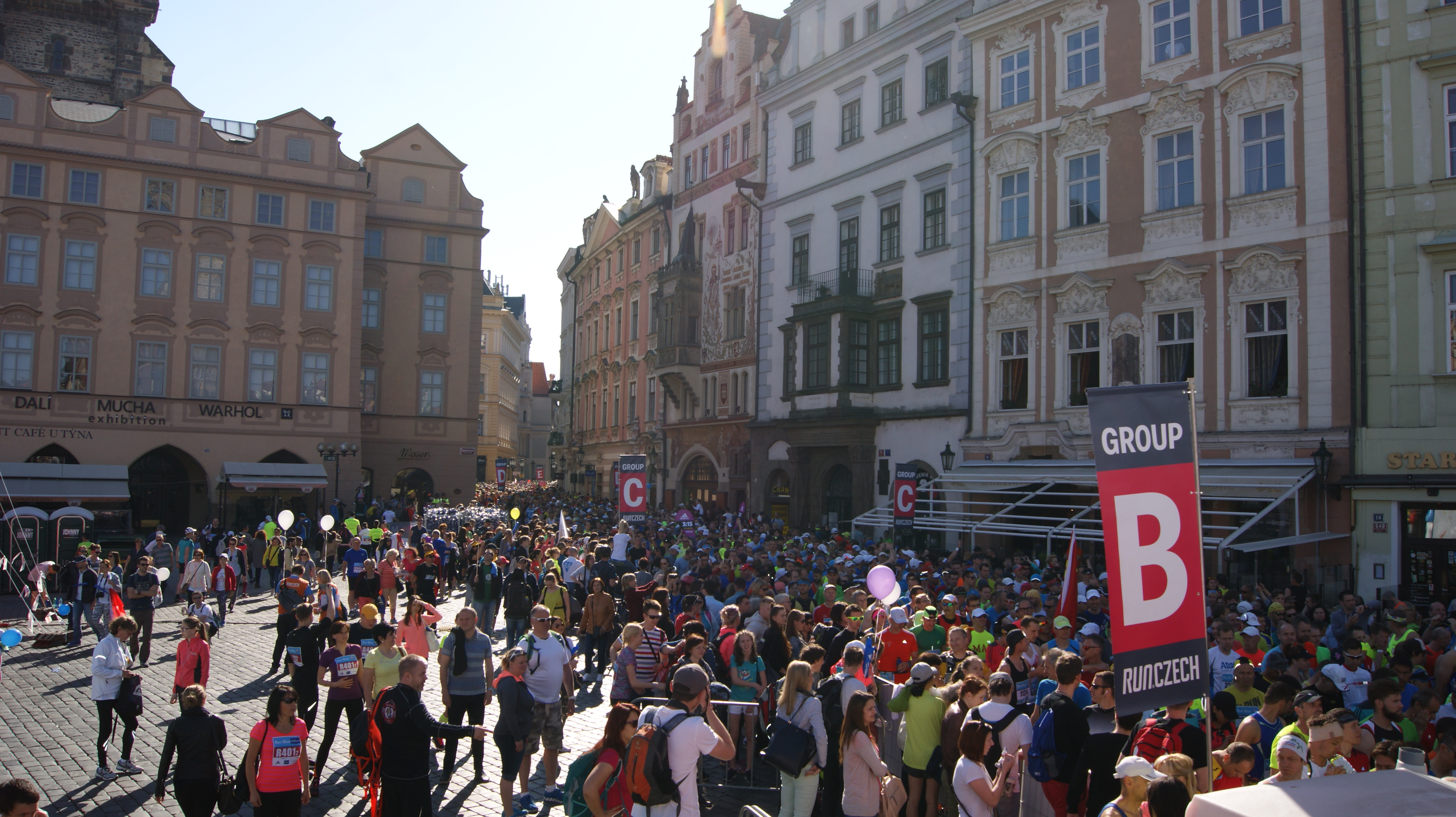
Lining up at the start in the corrals at the Old Town Square in 2016

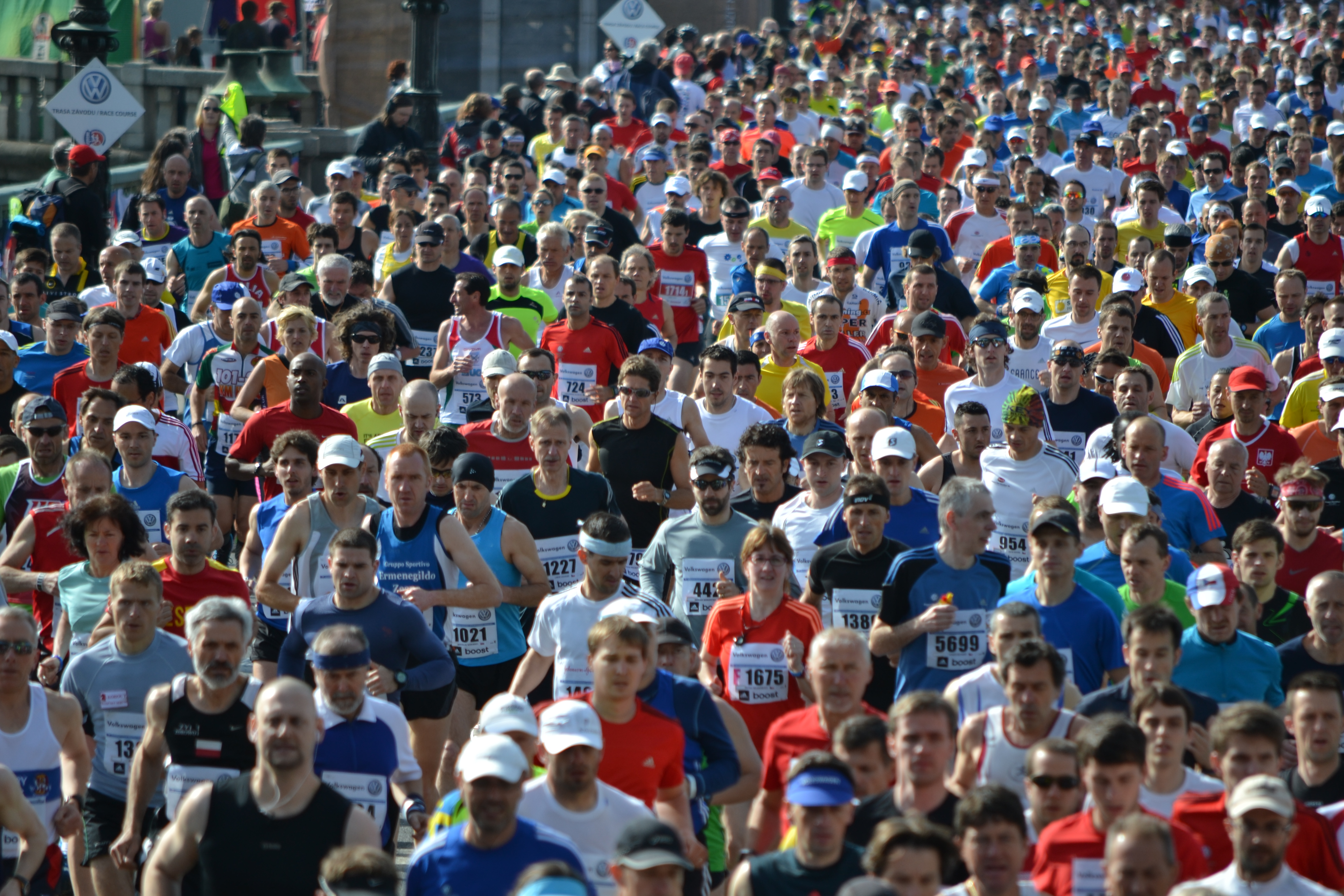
Runners on Čech Bridge in 2013

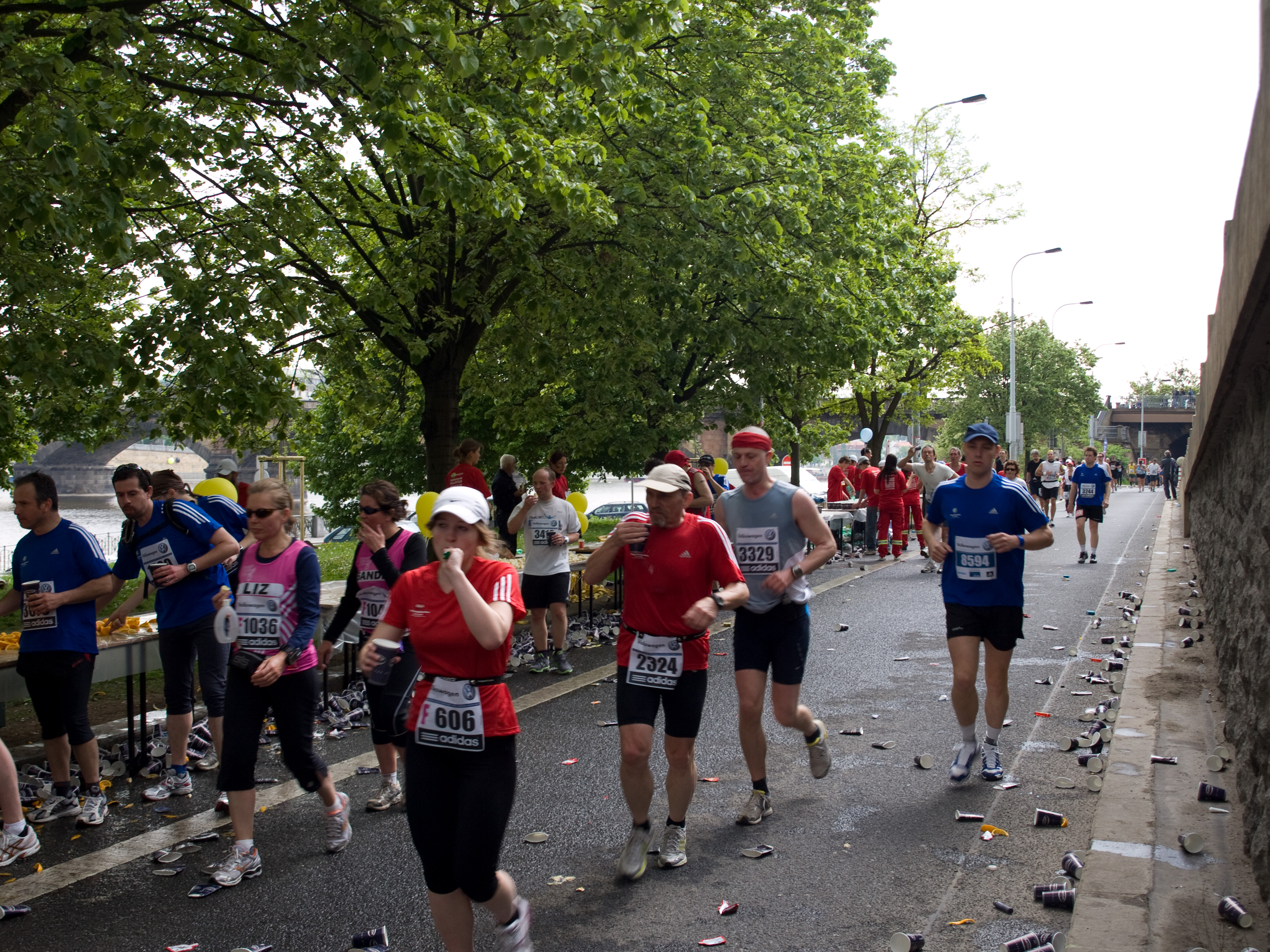
Taking on refreshment in 2010

The Prague Marathon (also known as Prague International Marathon, Czech: Pražský mezinárodní maraton) is an annual road marathon held in the city of Prague in the Czech Republic each May. It was founded in 1995 and has grown to become a significant event, being awarded IAAF Gold Label status. Prague's marathon course has been voted one of the most beautiful in the world.

== History ==
The inaugural marathon was held in 1995 with the support of Emil Zátopek, a Czech runner who had won the marathon at the 1952 Summer Olympics despite never having run a marathon before. For its inaugural year, the marathon itself had 985 participants, while runners in two additional races, measuring 9.2 and 4.8 km (5.7 and 3.0 mi), made up the rest of the roughly 15,000 participants in total.

The 2020 edition of the race was cancelled due to the coronavirus pandemic, with all registrants given the option of transferring their entry to 2021 or 2022 or transferring their entry to another runner. (Note: It had initially been postponed before being cancelled.) Similarly, the 2021 in-person edition was also cancelled due to the pandemic, with all registrants given the option of transferring their entry to 2022 or exchanging it for a shop voucher.

== Other races ==
The Prague Marathon event takes place over a full weekend and comprises several events, including the Prague International Marathon, the ČT 2Run, the DM Family Mile and the DM Bambini Run. The Prague Half Marathon, which is also awarded IAAF Gold Label status, is held each March or April.

== Winners ==
Since its inception in 1995, the men's race has been dominated by East African runners, with Kenyan athletes winning 18 titles alone. Angola-born Portuguese runner Hélder Ornelas became the first and so far only European men's winner in 2007. Kenyan Alexander Mutiso is the men's record holder with 2:05:09 hours.

The winners of the women's race have been mainly Kenyan and Ethiopian. Alena Vinnitskaya of Belarus is the most successful women's athlete, with three straight wins from 1996 to 1998. Israeli Lonah Chemtai Salpeter has the women's course best of 2:19:46 hours.

In 2019, Moroccan runner El Mahjoub Dazza crossed the finish line first, but was disqualified in 2020 by the Athletics Integrity Unit for using a prohibited substance, as determined by abnormalities in his athlete biological passport. Ethiopian runner Dawit Wolde was named the winner after Dazza's disqualification.

Key:

Course record (in bold)
Czech Republic championship race

=== Marathon ===
Ed.	Year	Men's winner	Time	Women's winner	Time	Rf.
1	1995	Tumo Turbo (ETH)	2:12:44	Svetlana Tkach (MDA)	2:39:33	
2	1996	William Musyoki (KEN)	2:12:21	Alena Vinnitskaya (BLR)	2:37:33	
3	1997	John Kagwe (KEN)	2:09:07	Alena Vinnitskaya (BLR)	2:32:58	
4	1998	Elijah Lagat (KEN)	2:08:52	Alena Vinnitskaya (BLR)	2:34:25	
5	1999	Eliud Kering (KEN)	2:11:19	Franca Fiacconi (ITA)	2:28:33	
6	2000	Simon Chemoiywo (KEN)	2:10:35	Alina Ivanova (RUS)	2:27:42	
7	2001	Andrea Sipe (TAN)	2:10:14	Maura Viceconte (ITA)	2:26:33	
8	2002	Henry Kiprotich (KEN)	2:11:41	Alevtina Ivanova (RUS)	2:32:24	
9	2003	Willy Kipkirui (KEN)	2:11:56	Anne Jelagat (KEN)	2:31:10	
10	2004	Barnabas Kipkoech (KEN)	2:12:15	Leila Aman (ETH)	2:31:48	
11	2005	Steven Cheptot (KEN)	2:10:42	Salina Kosgei (KEN)	2:28:42	
12	2006	Mubarak Hassan Shami (QAT)	2:11:11	Alina Ivanova (RUS)	2:29:20	
13	2007	Hélder Ornelas (POR)	2:11:49	Nailiya Yulamanova (RUS)	2:33:10	
14	2008	Kenneth Mungara (KEN)	2:11:06	Nailiya Yulamanova (RUS)	2:31:43	
15	2009	Patrick Ivuti (KEN)	2:07:48	Olga Glok (RUS)	2:28:27	
16	2010	Eliud Kiptanui (KEN)	2:05:39	Helena Kirop (KEN)	2:25:29	
17	2011	Benson Barus (KEN)	2:07:07	Lydia Cheromei (KEN)	2:22:34	
18	2012	Deressa Chimsa (ETH)	2:06:25	Agnes Kiprop (KEN)	2:25:40	
19	2013	Nicholas Kemboi (QAT)	2:08:51	Caroline Rotich (KEN)	2:27:00	
20	2014	Patrick Terer (KEN)	2:08:07	Firehiwot Dado (ETH)	2:23:34	
21	2015	Felix Kandie (KEN)	2:08:32	Yebrgual Melese (ETH)	2:23:49	
22	2016	Lawrence Cherono (KEN)	2:07:24	Lucy Karimi (KEN)	2:24:46	
23	2017	Gebretsadik Abraha (ETH)	2:08:47	Valary Aiyabei (KEN)	2:21:57	
24	2018	Galen Rupp (USA)	2:06:07	Bornes Kitur (KEN)	2:24:19	
25	2019	Dawit Wolde (ETH) (Note: El Mahjoub Dazza crossed the finish line first, but was disqualified for using a prohibited substance.)	2:06:18	Lonah Chemtai (ISR)	**2:19:46**	
—	—	cancelled in 2020 and 2021 due to coronavirus pandemic				
26	2022	Norbert Kigen (KEN)	2:07:54	Bekelech Gudeta (ETH)	2:22:56	
27	2023	Alexander Mutiso (KEN)	**2:05:09**	Workenesh Edesa (ETH)	2:20:42	
28	2024	Lemi Hayle (ETH)	2:08:44	Bedatu Hirpa (ETH)	2:23:41	
29	2025	Lemi Hayle (ETH)	2:05:14	Bertukan Welde (ETH)	2:20:55	
30	2026	Berehanu Tsegu (ETH)	2:05:51	Millicent Jelimo (KEN)	2:24:19	

=== Battle of the Teams ===
Battle of the Teams is an elite-only event inaugurated in 2021 during the coronavirus pandemic.

Ed.	Year	Men's winner	Time	Women's winner	Time	Rf.
1	2021	Benson Kipruto (KEN)	2:10:16	Purity Rionoripo (KEN)	2:20:14	

=== Multiple wins ===
Athlete	Wins	Category	Years
Alena Vinnitskaya (BLR)	3	Women's	1996, 1997, 1998
Alina Ivanova (RUS)	2	Women's	2000, 2006
Nailiya Yulamanova (RUS)	2	Women's	2007, 2008
Lemi Hayle (ETH)	2	Men's	2024, 2025

=== By country ===
Country	Total	Men's	Women's
Kenya	28	18	10
Ethiopia	14	7	7
Russia	6	0	6
Belarus	3	0	3
Italy	2	0	2
Qatar	2	2	0
Moldova	1	0	1
Tanzania	1	1	0
Portugal	1	1	0
United States	1	1	0
Israel	1	0	1
