= Rome Marathon =

Annual race in Italy since 1982

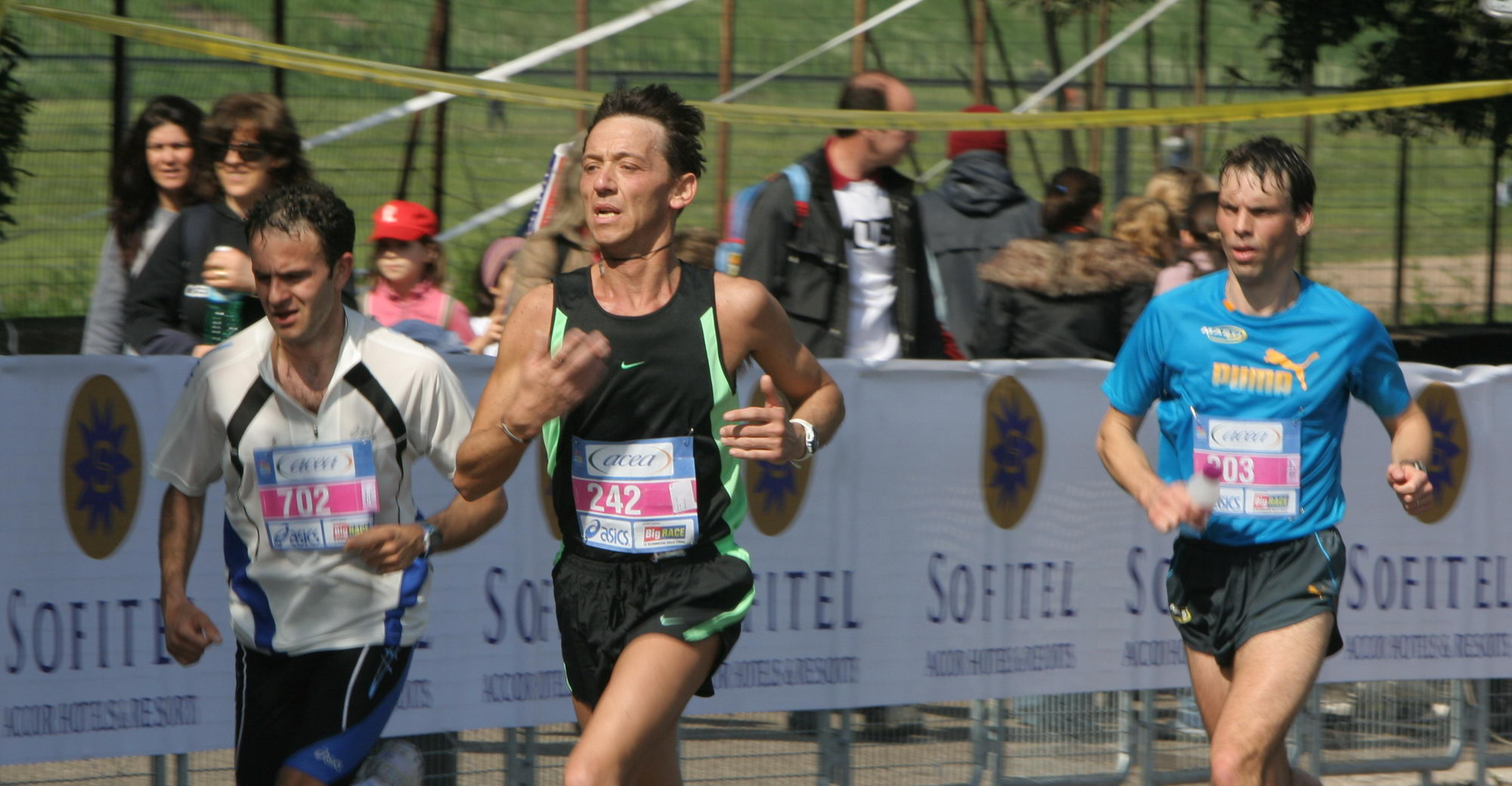
- Runners passing the Circus Maximus in 2006
- Date: April
- Location: Rome, Italy
- Event type: Road
- Distance: Marathon
- Primary sponsor: Acea
- Established: 1982 (44 years ago)
- Course records: Men's: 2:06:24 (2024) (Kenya) Asbel Rutto; Women's: 2:22:44 (2026) (Kenya) Pascaline Kibiwot
- Website: Rome Marathon
- Participants: 5,490 finishers (2022); 4,377 finishers (2021); 8,843 (2019)

The Rome Marathon (Italian: Maratona di Roma) is an annual marathon competition hosted by the city of Rome, Italy.

== History ==
Runners on Via Galvani in 2017

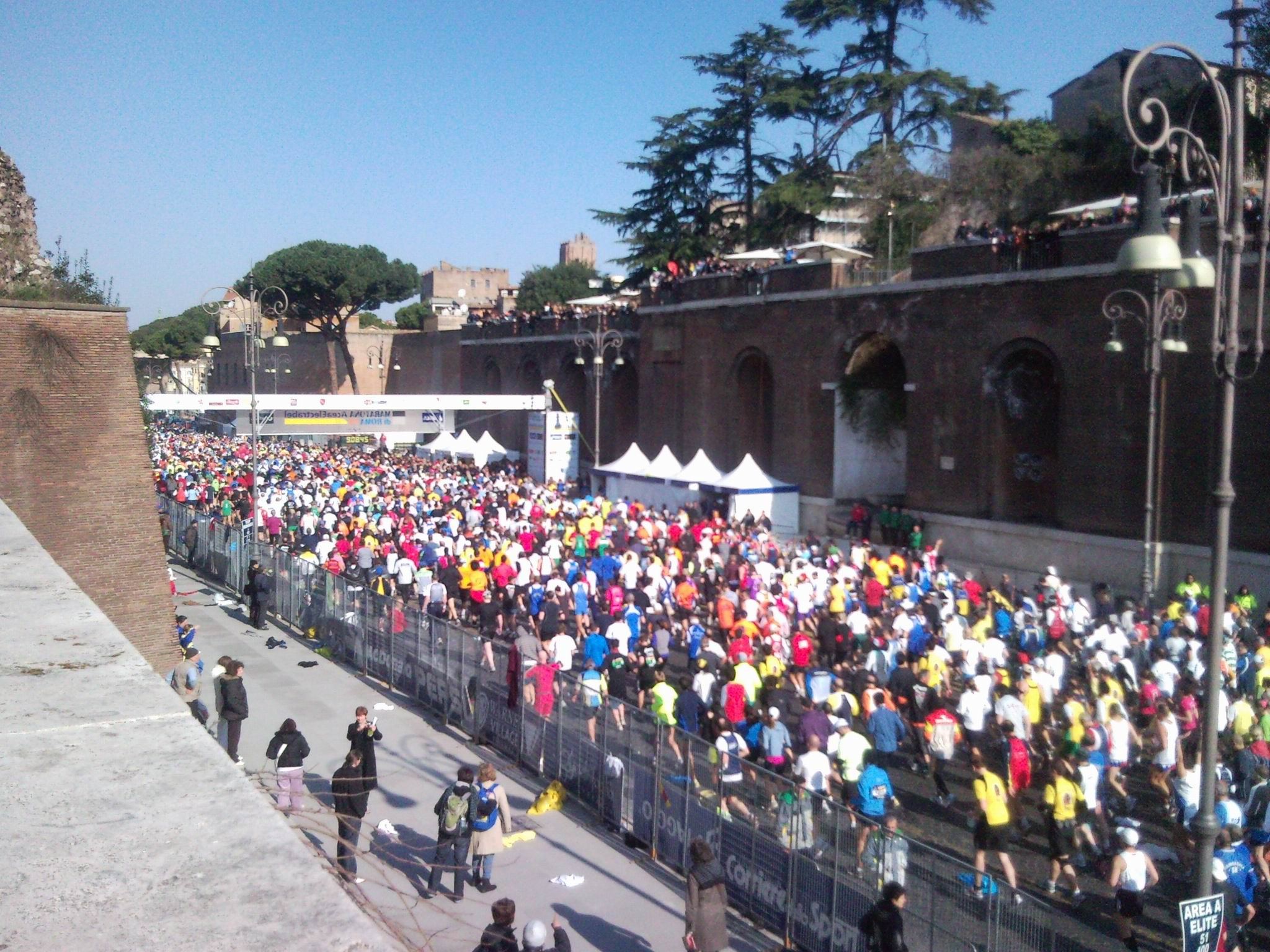
Start by Basilica of Maxentius, 2009

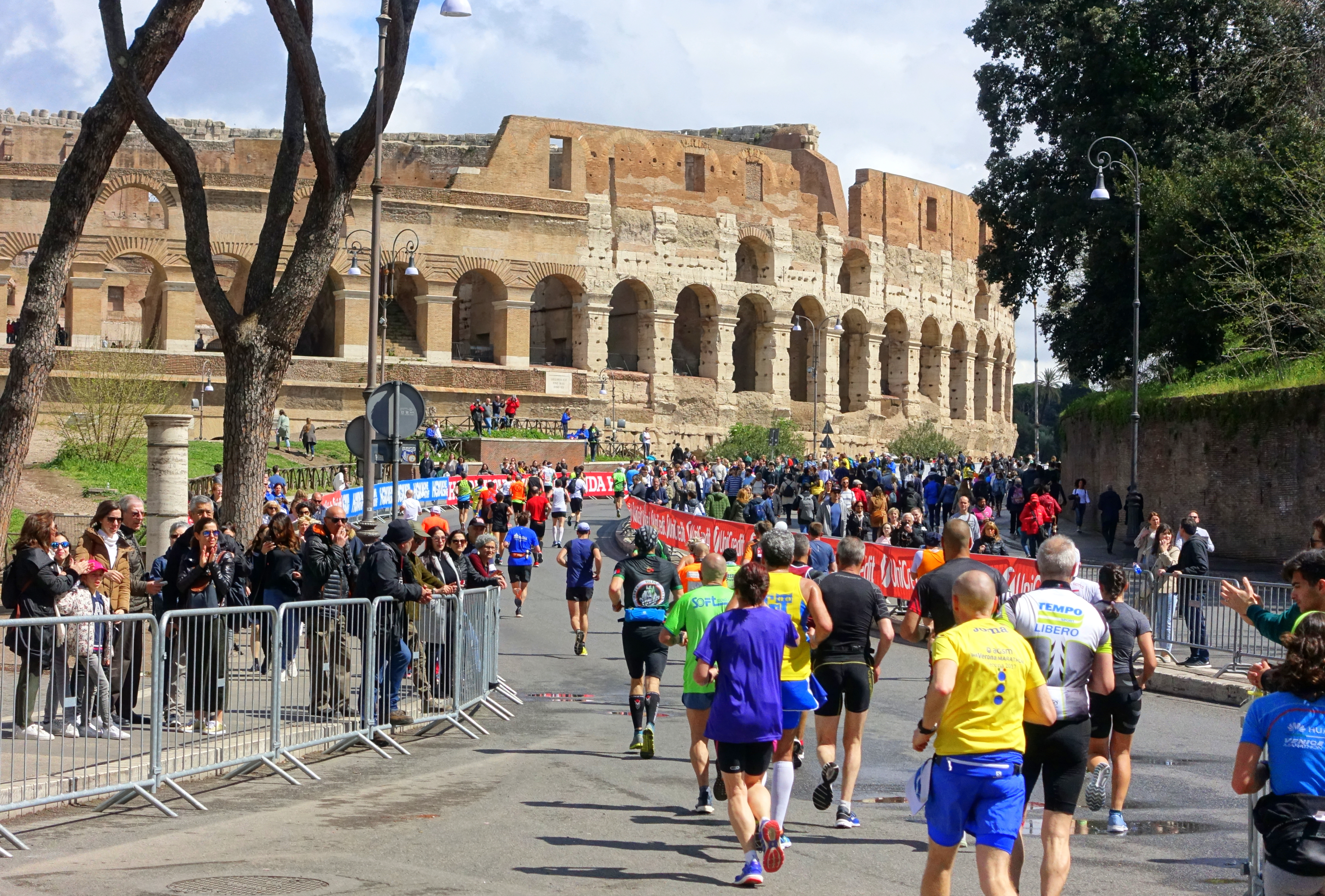
Approaching the Colosseum in 2019

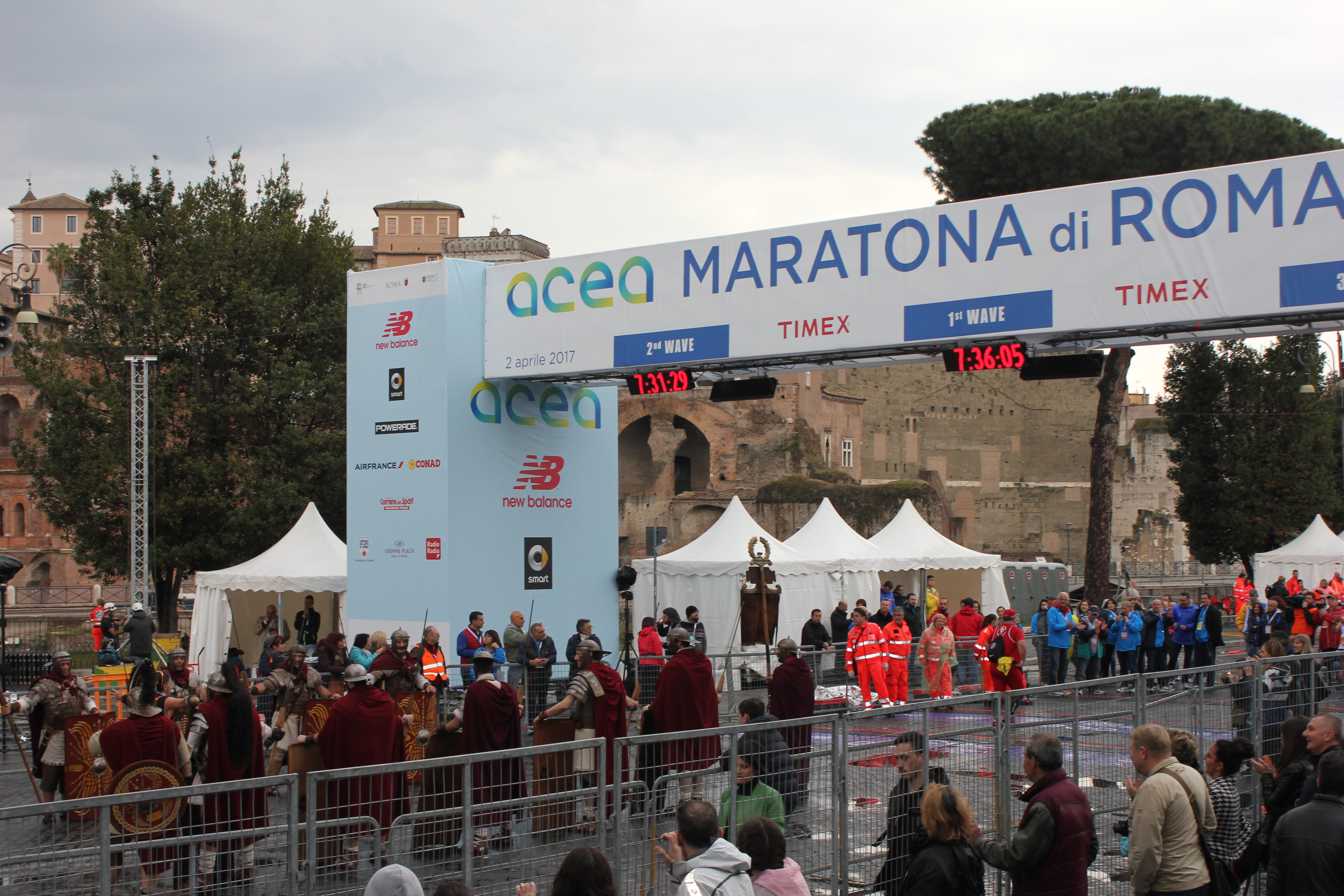
Finish on Via dei Fori Imperiali, 2017

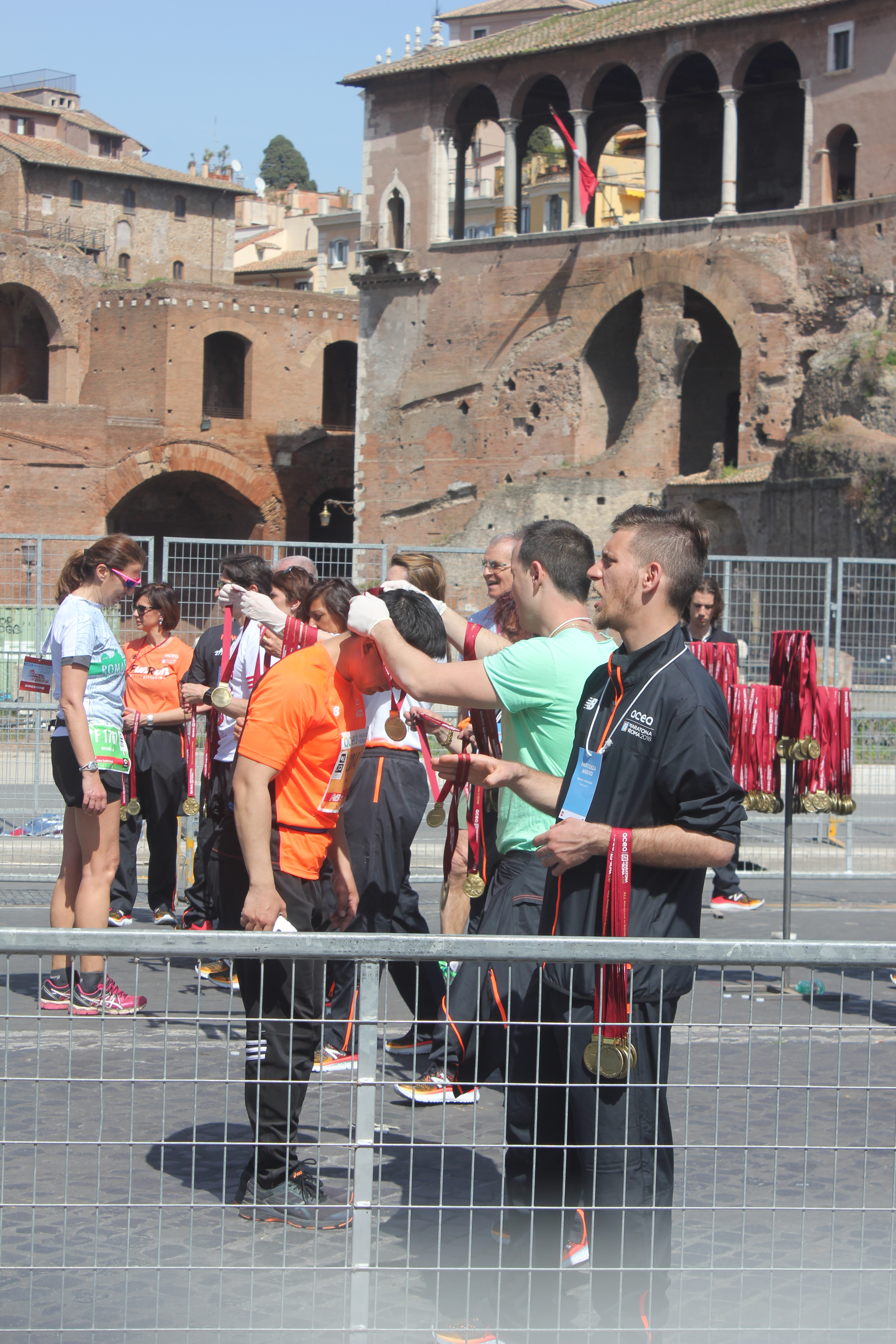
Awarding medals in 2018

The competition has also doubled as the Italian Marathon championships on two occasions; in 1983 and 1986. The race date was shifted from the traditional March schedule to 1 January in 2000 for a special edition of the event to celebrate the beginning of the new millennium. The IAAF Rome Millennium Marathon received the support of Primo Nebiolo and national federation president Gianni Gola. The race start point was at Saint Peter's Square and Pope John Paul II delivered a short benediction in approval of the event and the Bells of Saint Peter's replaced the usual starter's pistol to signal the beginning of the race.

The 2010 race was held in commemoration of the 50th anniversary of Abebe Bikila's win at the 1960 Rome Olympic marathon race, a watershed moment in the development of East African competitive running. The 2010 men's winner, Siraj Gena, earned a 5000€ bonus for crossing the finish line barefoot in honour of Abebe Bikila's style.

The 2020 edition of the race was cancelled due to the coronavirus outbreak, with all registration fees being applied for a guaranteed entry to the 2021 edition of the race, and all finishers to be awarded two medals in 2021.

== Winners ==
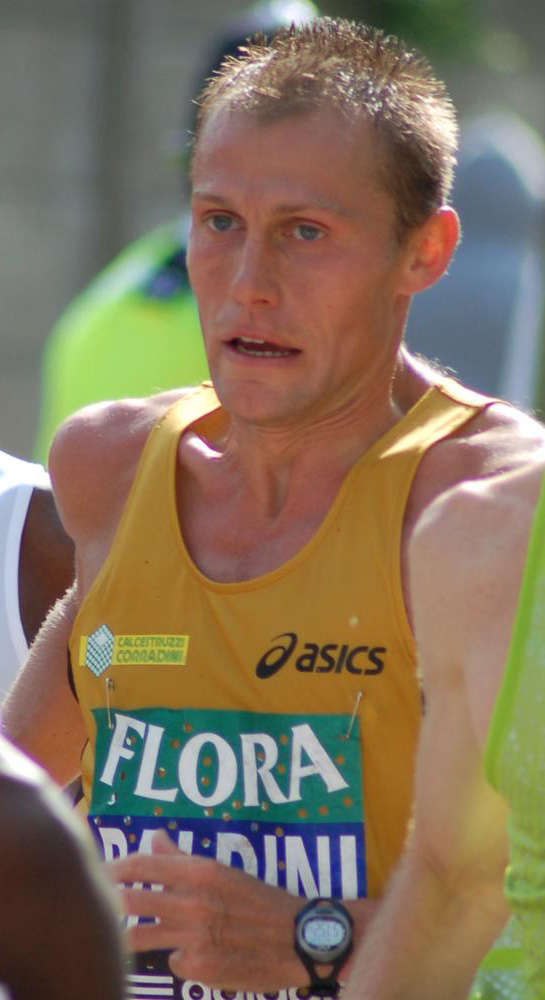
1998 winner Stefano Baldini (pictured here in London) also won the 2004 Olympic marathon.

Key:

Course record (in bold)
Short course
Italian championship race

| Year | Men's winner | Time | Women's winner | Time | Rf. |
|---|---|---|---|---|---|
| 1982 | Emiel Puttemans (BEL) | 2:09:53 | Laura Fogli (ITA) | 2:31:08 | |
| 1983 | Giuseppe Gerbi (ITA) | 2:15:11 | Alba Milana (ITA) | 2:32:57 | |
| 1984 | Bernie Ford (GBR) | 2:17:01 | Daniela Tiberti (ITA) | 2:41:40 | |
| 1985 | Mauro Pappacena (ITA) | 2:28:42 | Janet Richardson (USA) | 3:09:16 | |
| 1986 | Osvaldo Faustini (ITA) | 2:16:03 | Katherine Gregory (USA) | 3:23:43 | |
| 1987 | Gelindo Bordin (ITA) | 2:16:03 | Maria Araneo (ITA) | 2:56:00 | |
| 1988 | Sam Ngatia (KEN) | 2:16:46 | Fabiola Paoletti (ITA) | 2:48:45 | |
| 1989 | Guido Genicco (ITA) | 2:20:43 | Pascaline Wangui (KEN) | 2:46:28 | |
| 1990 | Tadesse Gebre (ETH) | 2:10:28 | Silvana Cucchietti (ITA) | 2:34:21 | |
| 1991 | Marco Milani (ITA) | 2:14:22 | Fabiola Oppliger (COL) | 2:39:31 | |
| — | not held from 1992 to 1994 | | | | |
| 1995 | Belayneh Tadesse (ETH) | 2:10:13 | Yelena Sipatova (RUS) | 2:37:46 | |
| 1996 | Moges Taye (ETH) | 2:12:03 | Fatuma Roba (ETH) | 2:29:05 | |
| 1997 | Dube Jillo (ETH) | 2:13:08 | Jane Salumäe (EST) | 2:31:41 | |
| 1998 | Stefano Baldini (ITA) | 2:09:33 | Franca Fiacconi (ITA) | 2:28:12 | |
| 1999 | Philip Tanui (KEN) | 2:09:56 | Maura Viceconte (ITA) | 2:29:36 | |
| 2000 | Josephat Kiprono (KEN) | 2:08:27 | Tegla Loroupe (KEN) | 2:32:03 | |
| 2001 | Henry Cherono (KEN) | 2:11:27 | Maria Guida (ITA) | 2:30:42 | |
| 2002 | Vincent Kipsos (KEN) | 2:09:30 | Maria Cocchetti (ITA) | 2:33:06 | |
| 2003 | Frederick Cherono (KEN) | 2:08:47 | Gloria Marconi (ITA) | 2:29:35 | |
| 2004 | Ruggero Pertile (ITA) | 2:10:12 | Ornella Ferrara (ITA) | 2:27:49 | |
| 2005 | Alberico Di Cecco (ITA) | 2:08:02 | Silviya Skvortsova (RUS) | 2:28:01 | |
| 2006 | David Kipkorir (KEN) | 2:08:38 | Tetyana Hladyr (UKR) | 2:25:44 | |
| 2007 | Elias Chelimo (KEN) | 2:09:36 | Souad Aït Salem (ALG) | 2:25:08 | |
| 2008 | Jonathan Yego (KEN) | 2:09:57 | Galina Bogomolova (RUS) | 2:22:53 | |
| 2009 | Benjamin Kiptoo (KEN) | 2:07:17 | Firehiwot Dado (ETH) | 2:27:08 | |
| 2010 | Siraj Gena (ETH) | 2:08:39 | Firehiwot Dado (ETH) | 2:25:28 | |
| 2011 | Dickson Chumba (KEN) | 2:08:45 | Firehiwot Dado (ETH) | 2:24:13 | |
| 2012 | Luka Kanda (KEN) | 2:08:04 | Hellen Kimutai (KEN) | 2:31:11 | |
| 2013 | Getachew Terfa (ETH) | 2:07:56 | Helena Kirop (KEN) | 2:24:40 | |
| 2014 | Shume Hailu (ETH) | 2:09:47 | Ayelu Lemma (ETH) | 2:34:49 | |
| 2015 | Abebe Negewo (ETH) | 2:12:23 | Meseret Kitata (ETH) | 2:30:25 | |
| 2016 | Amos Kipruto (KEN) | 2:08:12 | Rahma Tusa (ETH) | 2:28:49 | |
| 2017 | Shura Kitata (ETH) | 2:07:30 | Rahma Tusa (ETH) | 2:27:23 | |
| 2018 | Cosmas Birech (KEN) | 2:08:03 | Rahma Tusa (ETH) | 2:23:46 | |
| 2019 | Tebalu Zawude (ETH) | 2:08:37 | Alemu Megertu (ETH) | 2:22:52 | |
| 2020 | cancelled due to coronavirus pandemic | | | | |
| 2021 | Clement Langat (KEN) | 2:08:23 | Peris Jerono (KEN) | 2:29:29 | |
| 2022 | Fikre Bekele (ETH) | 2:06:48 | Sechale Dalasa (ETH) | 2:26:09 | |
| 2023 | Taoufik Allam (MAR) | 2:07:43 | Betty Chepkwony (KEN) | 2:23:02 | |
| 2024 | Asbel Rutto (KEN) | **2:06:24** | Ivyne Jeruto (KEN) | 2:24:36 | |
| 2025 | Robert Ngeno (KEN) | 2:07:35 | Betty Chepkwony (KEN) | 2:26:16 | |
| 2026 | Asbel Rutto (KEN) | 2:06:32 | Pascaline Kibiwot (KEN) | **2:22:44** | |

== See also ==
- Spirit of the Marathon II, 2013 documentary
