= Melanie Lubbe =

German chess player (born 1990)

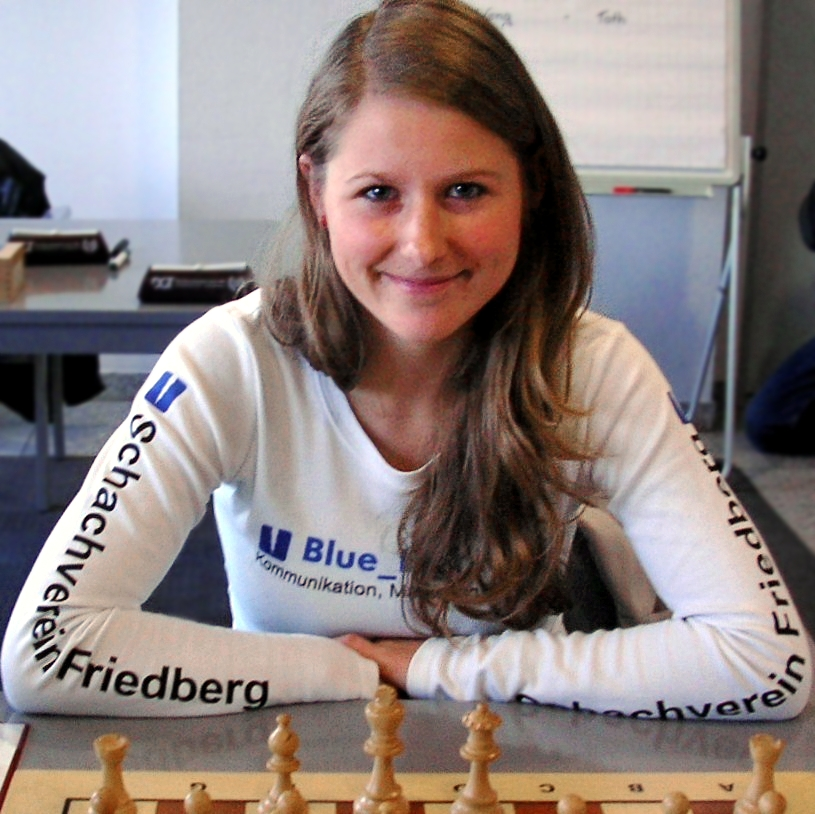
- Lubbe in Stuttgart, 2011

Personal information
- Born: 23 June 1990 (age 36) Leipzig, Germany
- Spouse: Nikolas Lubbe (m. 2015)

Chess career
- Country: Germany
- Title: Woman Grandmaster (2012)
- FIDE rating: 2297 (December 2021)
- Peak rating: 2387 (March 2012)

Melanie Lubbe (née Ohme, born 23 June 1990) is a German chess player who holds the FIDE title of Woman Grandmaster (WGM, 2012).

== Biography ==
Lubbe was the eldest of six siblings. She learned playing chess at the age of four from her parents. She won German Girls' Championships in the under-14 age group (2003), under-16 age group (2005) and under-18 age group.

Melanie Lubbe played for Germany in Women's Chess Olympiads:

- In 2008, at fourth board in the 38th Chess Olympiad (women) in Dresden (+6, =0, -3),
- In 2010, at fourth board in the 39th Chess Olympiad (women) in Khanty-Mansiysk (+4, =3, -2),
- In 2012, at third board in the 40th Chess Olympiad (women) in Istanbul (+4, =1, -4),
- In 2014, at fourth board in the 41st Chess Olympiad (women) in Tromsø (+6, =1, -2),
- In 2016, at fourth board in the 42nd Chess Olympiad (women) in Baku (+3, =0, -4).

Lubbe played for Germany in the World Women's Team Chess Championship:

- In 2007, at second board in the 1st Women's World Team Chess Championship 2007 in Yekaterinburg (+2, =3, -2).

Lubbe played for Germany in European Team Chess Championships:

- In 2007, at fourth board in the 7th European Team Chess Championship (women) in Heraklion (+5, =1, -2),
- In 2009, at third board in the 8th European Team Chess Championship (women) in Novi Sad (+3, =1, -3),
- In 2011, at reserve board in the 9th European Team Chess Championship (women) in Porto Carras (+5, =3, -0) and won individual silver medal,
- In 2015, at fourth board in the 11th European Team Chess Championship (women) in Reykjavík (+3, =4, -1).

In 2009 she was awarded the FIDE Woman International Master (WIM) title and in 2012 the Woman Grandmaster (WGM) title.

Lubbe studied psychology from 2010 to 2013 at the University of Mannheim and graduated with a bachelor's degree. Since February 2015 she works as a personnel consultant in Braunschweig.

Also since 2015, Lubbe has been married to grandmaster Nikolas Lubbe.
