= List of winners of the Chicago Marathon =

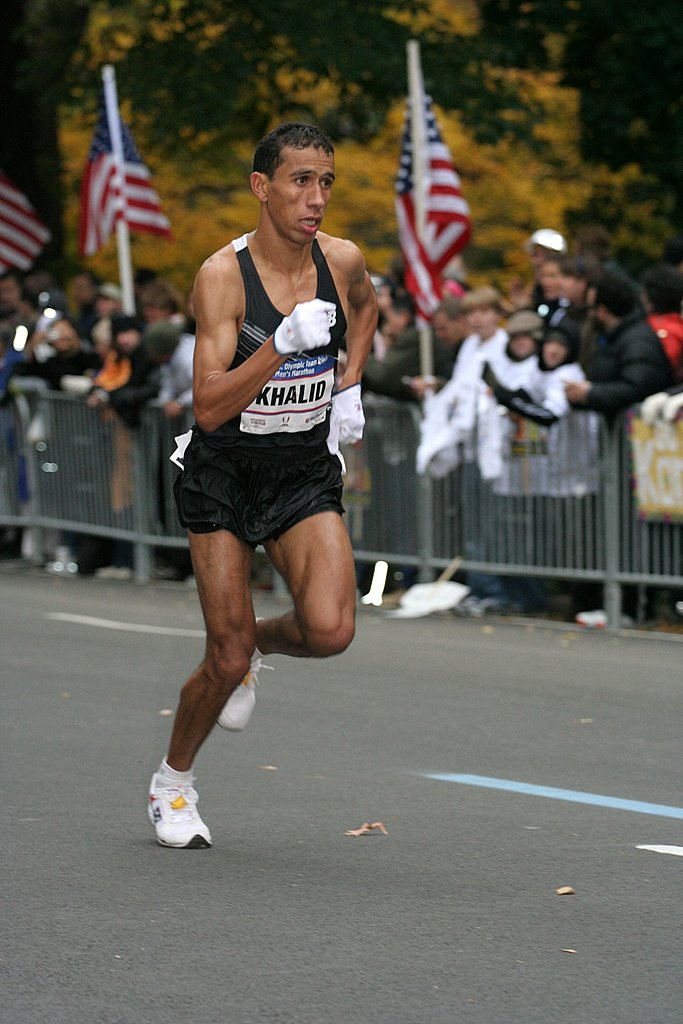
Khalid Khannouchi is a four-time Chicago Marathon winner.

The Chicago Marathon, one of the six World Marathon Majors, has been contested by men and women annually since 1977. Since 1983, it has been held annually in October. The United States had been represented by the most Chicago Marathon winners in the open division (nine men and twelve women). At 32 victories (20 men and 12 women) in the open division, Kenya has the second most winners and is tied with the United States for female victors, and Kenyan men have won more times than men representing any other country, including nine victories in a row from 2003 through 2011. The United Kingdom and Ethiopia are tied for third place in total victories in the open division at nine, while Switzerland is second behind the United States's 57 victories in the wheelchair division with 11. All four of Brazil's victors have been men, and all three of Portugal's winners have been women.

== History ==
The first six pairs of races were swept by the United States. Runners representing the United Kingdom won both races in 1996 (Paul Evans and Marian Sutton). Kenya has been victorious in both races twice (1998 and 2001) and is the most recent country to do so, with representatives Ben Kimondiu and Catherine Ndereba. Deena Kastor, the 2005 female winner, is the last victor from the host nation. Although four-time winner Khalid Khannouchi represented the United States during his 2000 and 2002 victories after becoming an American citizen, the last American-born male winner prior to 2017 was Greg Meyer. Galen Rupp became the first American-born male to win the race in 35 years with his 2017 victory. 1979 winner Laura Michalek of the United States was just 15 years old.

Khannouchi's four victories is the most by any contestant. There have been several two-time winners including Khannouchi, five men and six women. Four of the five male two-time winners have been consecutive winners (most recently Evans Rutto in 2002 and 2003), and six of the seven two-time female victors have been consecutive (most recently Berhane Adere in 2006 and 2007). No one other than Khannouchi has won three races and no one has won three consecutively.

The world record for the marathon had been set six times: three male and three female world records. The United Kingdom has had both a male and a female fastest marathon world record in Chicago. The women's world record was once set by Paula Radcliffe, who succeeded Catherine Ndereba as a world record holder in 2002. The record has been set in 2019 by Brigid Kosgei. Khannouchi set the last male fastest marathon world record in the Chicago Marathon in 1999. After Ndereba set the record in 2001, both the men's and women's current fastest marathon world records had been set in the Chicago Marathon.

== Winners ==
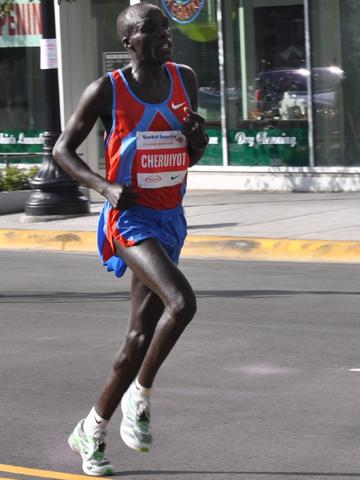
2008 Chicago Marathon winner Evans Cheruiyot

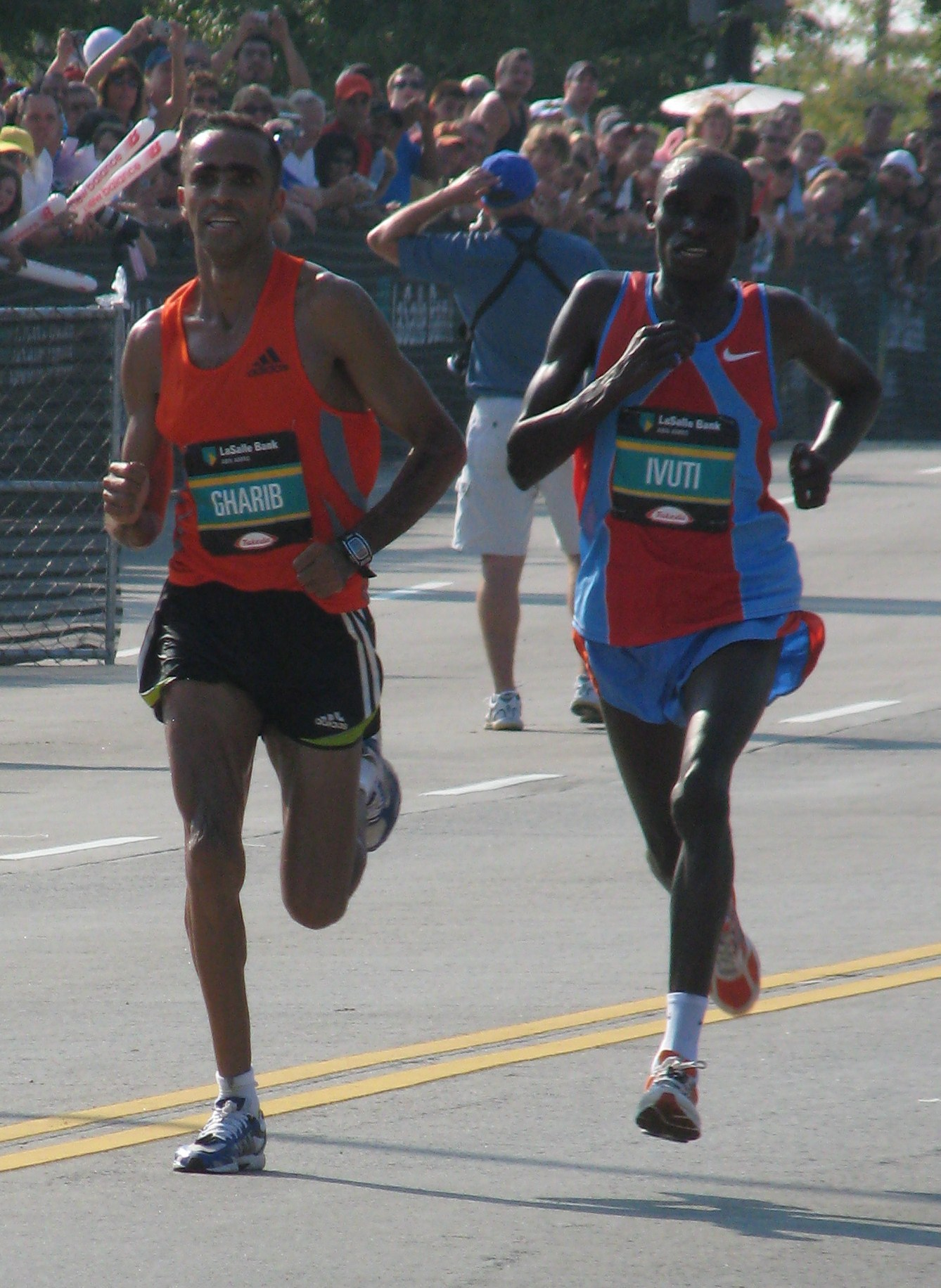
The 2007 Chicago Marathon final 200 meters was a duel between Patrick Ivuti (right) & Jaouad Gharib (left). Ivuti won by 5/100ths of a second.

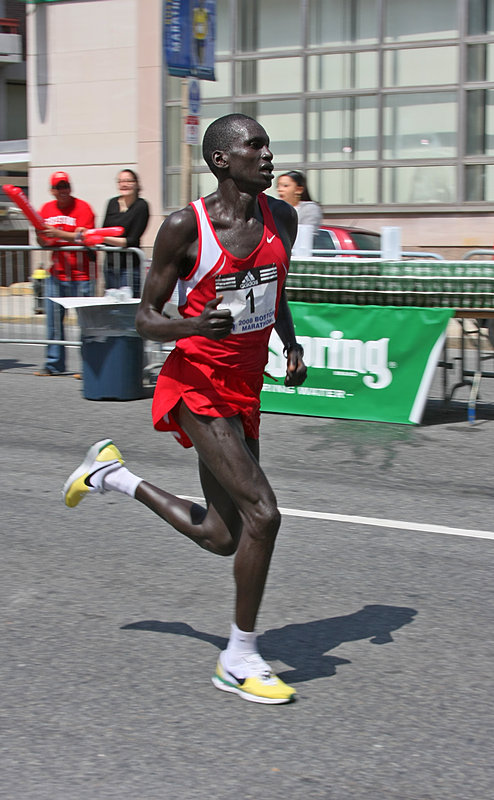
2006 winner Robert Kipkoech Cheruiyot in 2008

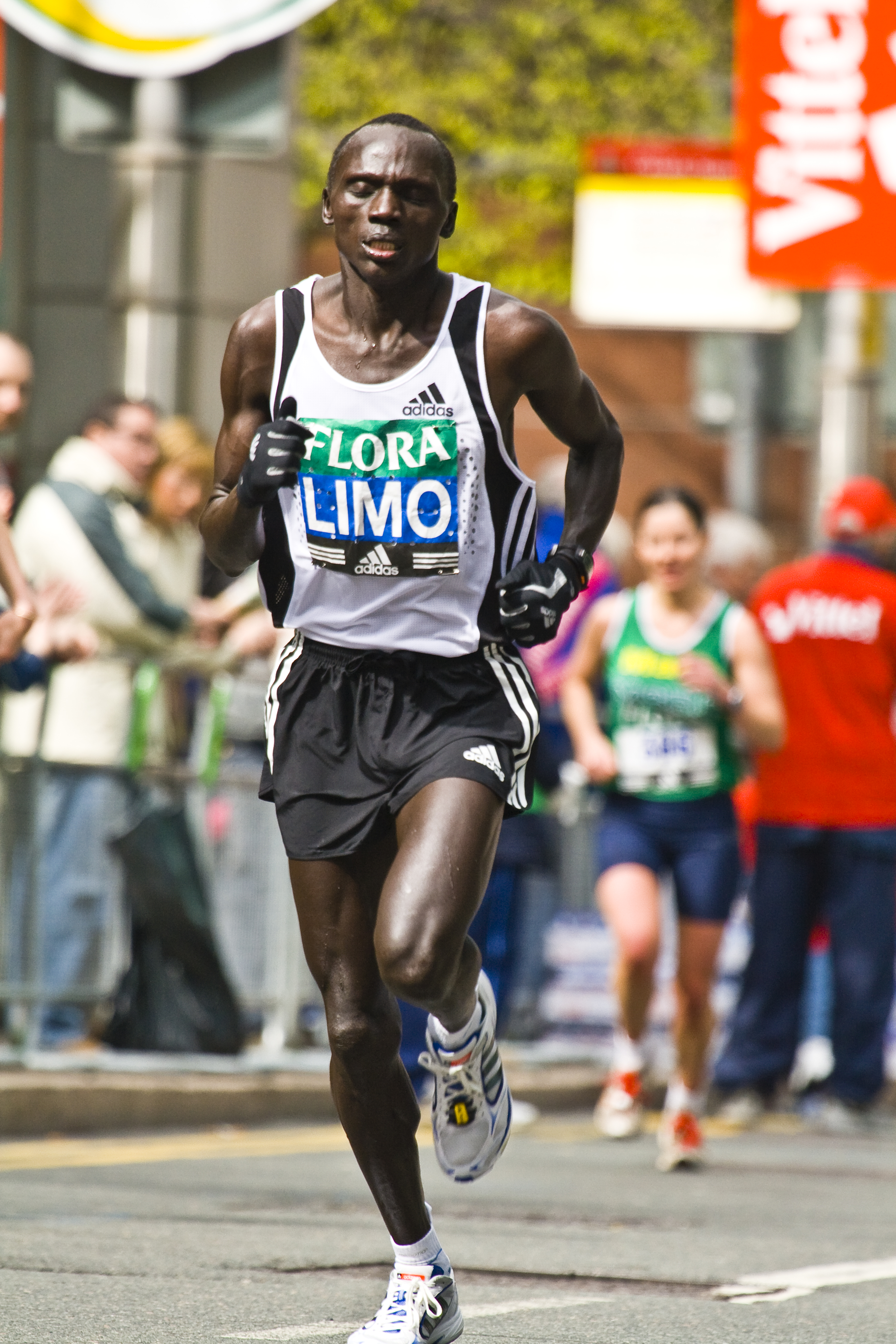
2005 winner Felix Limo in 2008

Legend

‡ Course record

Year	Male athlete	Country	Time	Female athlete	Country	Time	Ref.
1977	Dan Cloeter	United States	2:17:52	Dorothy Doolittle	United States	2:50:47	
1978	Mark Stanforth	United States	2:19:20	Lynae Larson	United States	2:59:25	
1979	Dan Cloeter	United States	2:23:20	Laura Michalek	United States	3:15:45	
1980	Frank Richardson	United States	2:14:04	Sue Petersen	United States	2:45:03	
1981	Phil Coppess	United States	2:16:13	Tina Gandy	United States	2:49:39	
1982	Greg Meyer	United States	2:10:59	Nancy Conz	United States	2:33:23	
1983	Joseph Nzau	Kenya	2:09:44	Rosa Mota	Portugal	2:31:12	
1984	Steve Jones	Great Britain	2:08:05 WR	Rosa Mota	Portugal	2:26:01	
1985	Steve Jones	Great Britain	2:07:13	Joan Benoit	United States	2:21:21	
1986	Toshihiko Seko	Japan	2:08:27	Ingrid Kristiansen	Norway	2:27:08	
1987	marathon distance not held due to sponsorship issues (Note: The event was contested as a half marathon.)						
1988	Alejandro Cruz	Mexico	2:08:57	Lisa Weidenbach	United States	2:29:17	
1989	Paul Davies-Hale	Great Britain	2:11:25	Lisa Weidenbach	United States	2:28:15	
1990	Martín Pitayo	Mexico	2:09:41	Aurora Cunha	Portugal	2:30:11	
1991	Joseildo Rocha	Brazil	2:14:33	Midde Hamrin	Sweden	2:36:21	
1992	Jose Cesar de Souza	Brazil	2:16:14	Linda Somers	United States	2:37:41	
1993	Luíz Antônio	Brazil	2:13:14	Ritva Lemettinen	Finland	2:33:18	
1994	Luíz Antônio	Brazil	2:11:16	Kristy Johnston	United States	2:31:34	
1995	Eamonn Martin	Great Britain	2:11:18	Ritva Lemettinen	Finland	2:28:27	
1996	Paul Evans	Great Britain	2:08:52	Marian Sutton	United Kingdom	2:30:41	
1997	Khalid Khannouchi	Morocco	2:07:10	Marian Sutton	United Kingdom	2:29:03	
1998	Ondoro Osoro	Kenya	2:06:54	Joyce Chepchumba	Kenya	2:23:57	
1999	Khalid Khannouchi	Morocco	2:05:42 WR	Joyce Chepchumba	Kenya	2:25:59	
2000	Khalid Khannouchi	United States	2:07:01	Catherine Ndereba	Kenya	2:21:33	
2001	Ben Kimondiu	Kenya	2:08:52	Catherine Ndereba	Kenya	2:18:47 WR	
2002	Khalid Khannouchi	United States	2:05:56	Paula Radcliffe	United Kingdom	2:17:18 WR	
2003	Evans Rutto	Kenya	2:05:50	Svetlana Zakharova	Russia	2:23:07	
2004	Evans Rutto	Kenya	2:06:16	Constantina Diță	Romania	2:23:45	
2005	Felix Limo	Kenya	2:07:02	Deena Kastor	United States	2:21:25	
2006	Robert Cheruiyot	Kenya	2:07:35	Berhane Adere	Ethiopia	2:20:42	
2007	Patrick Ivuti	Kenya	2:11:11	Berhane Adere	Ethiopia	2:33:49	
2008	Evans Cheruiyot	Kenya	2:06:25	Lidiya Grigoryeva	Russia	2:27:17	
2009	Samuel Wanjiru	Kenya	2:05:41	Irina Mikitenko (Note: Liliya Shobukhova finished first in 2009, 2010 and 2011 but was subsequently disqualified and records erased because of a positive drug test. Her penalty was announced in 2014.)	Germany	2:26:31	
2010	Samuel Wanjiru	Kenya	2:06:23	Atsede Baysa	Ethiopia	2:23:40	
2011	Moses Mosop	Kenya	2:05:37	Ejegayehu Dibaba	Ethiopia	2:22:09	
2012	Tsegaye Kebede	Ethiopia	2:04:38	Atsede Baysa	Ethiopia	2:22:03	
2013	Dennis Kimetto	Kenya	2:03:45	Rita Jeptoo	Kenya	2:19:57	
2014	Eliud Kipchoge	Kenya	2:04:11	Mare Dibaba (Note: Rita Jeptoo tested positive in an out-of-competition drug test for EPO on September 25, 2014. The drug test was confirmed in December 20, 2014, and her two-year suspension was made retroactive to the date of the positive test, which was before the Chicago Marathon, on October 12, 2014 when she had originally finished first in 2:24:35.)	Ethiopia	2:25:37	
2015	Dickson Chumba	Kenya	2:09:25	Florence Kiplagat	Kenya	2:23:33	
2016	Abel Kirui	Kenya	2:11:23	Florence Kiplagat	Kenya	2:21:32	
2017	Galen Rupp	United States	2:09:20	Tirunesh Dibaba	Ethiopia	2:18:31	
2018	Mo Farah	Great Britain	2:05:11	Brigid Kosgei	Kenya	2:18:35	
2019	Lawrence Cherono	Kenya	2:05:45	Brigid Kosgei	Kenya	2:14:04 WR	
2020	cancelled due to coronavirus pandemic						
2021	Seifu Tura	Ethiopia	2:06:12	Ruth Chepngetich	Kenya	2:22:31	
2022	Benson Kipruto	Kenya	2:04:24	Ruth Chepngetich	Kenya	2:14:18	
2023	Kelvin Kiptum	Kenya	2:00:35‡ WR	Sifan Hassan	Netherlands	2:13:44	
2024	John Korir	Kenya	2:02:43	Ruth Chepngetich	Kenya	2:09:56‡ WR	
2025	Jacob Kiplimo	Uganda	2:02:23	Hawi Feysa	Ethiopia	2:14:56	
2026	Amos Kipruto	Kenya	2:01:09	Hawi Feysa	Ethiopia	2:13:33	

== Wheelchair division ==
Year	Male athlete	Country	Time	Female athlete	Country	Time	Ref.
1984	Robert Fitch	United States	2:35:06	Jonnie Baylark	United States	3:29:10	
1985	Robert Fitch	United States	2:23:41	Jayne Fortson	United States	2:52:22	
1986	Bart Bardwell	United States	2:10:19	Jonnie Baylark	United States	3:23:32	
1987	marathon distance not held due to sponsorship issues						
1988	Ken Luckenbaugh	United States	2:12:17	—			
1989	Scot Hollonbeck	United States	1:45:30	Ann Cody-Morris	United States	1:58:51	
1990	Jim Knaub	United States	1:42:34	Ann Cody-Morris	United States	1:53:33	
1991	Philippe Couprie	France	1:41:21	Ann Walters	United States	1:57:17	
1992	Vern Achenbach	United States	1:44:28	Ann Walters	United States	1:44:29	
1993	James Briggs	United States	1:42:03	Ann Walters	United States	1:57:34	
1994	James Briggs	United States	1:32:14	Ann Walters	United States	1:59:45	
1995	James Briggs; Scot Hollonbeck	United States; United States	1:37:12	Ann Walters	United States	1:57:27	
1996	Jacob Heilveil	United States	1:39:57	Ann Walters	United States	1:52:13	
1997	Saul Mendoza	United States	1:37:42	Candace Cable	United States	1:57:32	
1998	Franz Nietlispach	Switzerland	1:34:22	Candace Cable	United States	1:58:32	
1999	Saul Mendoza	United States	1:37:03	Miriam Nibley	United States	2:03:44	
2000	Tony Iniguez	United States	1:41:00	no competitors			
2001	Tony Iniguez	United States	1:37:59	Christina Ripp	United States	1:56:58	
2002	Adam Bleakney	United States	1:40:14	Tricia Downing	United States	1:52:50	
2003	Joshua George	United States	1:41:01	Christina Ripp	United States	1:56:33	
2004	Joshua George	United States	1:36:13	Miriam Nibley	United States	2:05:51	
2005	Krige Schabort	South Africa	1:29:40	Miriam Ladner	United States	2:01:37	
2006	Joshua George	United States	1:38:31	Miriam Lander	United States	2:04:21	
2007	Kurt Fearnley	Australia	1:28:06	Amanda McGrory	United States	1:45:27	
2008	Kurt Fearnley	Australia	1:30:16	Amanda McGrory	United States	1:55:12	
2009	Kurt Fearnley	Australia	1:29:09	Tatyana McFadden	United States	1:50:47	
2010	Heinz Frei	Switzerland	1:26:56	Amanda McGrory	United States	1:47:25	
2011	Kurt Fearnley	Australia	1:29:18	Tatyana McFadden	United States	1:45:03	
2012	Josh Cassidy	Canada	1:32:58	Tatyana McFadden	United States	1:49:52	
2013	Ernst Van Dyk	South Africa	1:30:37	Tatyana McFadden	United States	1:42:35	
2014	Joshua George	United States	1:32:12	Tatyana McFadden	United States	1:44:50	
2015	Kurt Fearnley	Australia	1:30:46	Tatyana McFadden	United States	1:41:10	
2016	Marcel Hug	Switzerland	1:32:57	Tatyana McFadden	United States	1:42:28	
2017	Marcel Hug	Switzerland	1:29:23	Tatyana McFadden	United States	1:39:15	
2018	Daniel Romanchuk	United States	1:31:34	Manuela Schar	Switzerland	1:41:38	
2019	Daniel Romanchuk	United States	1:30:26	Manuela Schar	Switzerland	1:41:08	
2020	cancelled due to coronavirus pandemic						
2021	Daniel Romanchuk	United States	1:29:07	Tatyana McFadden	United States	1:48:57	
2022	Marcel Hug	Switzerland	1:25:20	Susannah Scaroni	United States	1:45:48	
2023	Marcel Hug	Switzerland	1:22:37‡	Catherine Debrunner	Switzerland	1:38:44‡	
2024	Marcel Hug	Switzerland	1:25:54	Catherine Debrunner	Switzerland	1:36:12	
2025	Marcel Hug	Switzerland	1:23:20	Susannah Scaroni	United States	1:38:14	
2026	Marcel Hug	Switzerland	1:21:34	Catherine Debrunner	Switzerland	1:33:16	

== Country summary ==
Total winners by country
Country	Open division		Wheelchair division		Total
Country	Male	Female	Male	Female	Total
United States	9	12	24	33	78
Kenya	20	12	0	0	32
Switzerland	0	0	7	4	11
Ethiopia	2	7	0	0	9
United Kingdom	6	3	0	0	9
Australia	0	0	5	0	5
Brazil	4	0	0	0	4
Portugal	0	3	0	0	3
Finland	0	2	0	0	2
Mexico	2	0	0	0	2
Morocco	2	0	0	0	2
Russia	0	2	0	0	2
South Africa	0	0	2	0	2
Canada	0	0	1	0	1
France	0	0	1	0	1
Germany	0	1	0	0	1
Japan	1	0	0	0	1
Netherlands	0	1	0	0	1
Norway	0	1	0	0	1
Romania	0	1	0	0	1
Sweden	0	1	0	0	1
