= 1995 Chicago Marathon =

Footrace held in Chicago, Illinois

18th Chicago Marathon
- Venue: Chicago, United States
- Dates: October 15

Champions
- Men: Eamonn Martin (2:11:18)
- Women: Ritva Lemettinen (2:28:27)

The 1995 Chicago Marathon was the 18th running of the annual marathon race in Chicago, United States and was held on October 15. The elite men's race was won by Britain's Eamonn Martin in a time of 2:11:18 hours and the women's race was won by Finland's Ritva Lemettinen in 2:28:27.

== Results ==
=== Men ===
| Position | Athlete | Nationality | Time |
|---|---|---|---|
| 1 | Eamonn Martin | United Kingdom | 2:11:18 |
| 2 | Carlos Bautista | Mexico | 2:11:21 |
| 3 | Leonid Shvetsov | Russia | 2:11:24 |
| 4 | Driss Dacha | Morocco | 2:12:05 |
| 5 | Eddy Hellebuyck | Belgium | 2:12:35 |
| 6 | Luis Reyes | Mexico | 2:12:51 |
| 7 | Jesús Herrera | Mexico | 2:13:18 |
| 8 | Carlos Grisales | Colombia | 2:13:41 |
| 9 | Maurilio Castillo | Mexico | 2:14:17 |
| 10 | Hector De Jesus | Mexico | 2:14:27 |

=== Women ===
| Position | Athlete | Nationality | Time |
|---|---|---|---|
| 1 | Ritva Lemettinen | Finland | 2:28:27 |
| 2 | Kim Jones | United States | 2:31:24 |
| 3 | Danuta Bartoszek | Canada | 2:31:46 |
| 4 | Gitte Karlshøj | Denmark | 2:32:10 |
| 5 | Marian Sutton | United Kingdom | 2:32:36 |
| 6 | Tatyana Ivanova | Russia | 2:34:59 |
| 7 | Tatyana Pozdnyakova | Ukraine | 2:35:14 |
| 8 | Kristy Johnston | United States | 2:35:50 |
| 9 | Irina Bogacheva | Kyrgyzstan | 2:37:26 |
| 10 | Iglandini González | Colombia | 2:37:26 |
