= 1996 Chicago Marathon =

Footrace held in Chicago, Illinois

19th Chicago Marathon
- Venue: Chicago, United States
- Dates: October 20

Champions
- Men: Paul Evans (2:08:52)
- Women: Marian Sutton (2:30:41)

The 1996 Chicago Marathon was the 19th running of the annual marathon race in Chicago, United States and was held on October 20. The elite men's race was won by Britain's Paul Evans in a time of 2:08:52 hours and the women's race was won in 2:30:41 by Marian Sutton, also of Great Britain.

== Results ==
=== Men ===
Position	Athlete	Nationality	Time
1	Paul Evans	United Kingdom	2:08:52
2	Jerry Lawson	United States	2:10:04
3	Leonid Shvetsov	Russia	2:10:23
4	Eamonn Martin	United Kingdom	2:11:21
5	Gary Staines	United Kingdom	2:11:25
6	Jackson Kabiga	Kenya	2:11:44
7	Carlos Bautista	Mexico	2:12:18
8	Luis Reyes	Mexico	2:13:04
9	Eddy Hellebuyck	Belgium	2:13:19
10	Antonio Rodríguez	Portugal	2:13:27

=== Women ===
Position	Athlete	Nationality	Time
1	Marian Sutton	United Kingdom	2:30:41
2	Kristy Johnston	United States	2:31:06
3	Danuta Bartoszek	Canada	2:33:01
4	Gitte Karlshøj	Denmark	2:33:53
5	Irina Bogacheva	Kyrgyzstan	2:34:36
6	Bonnie McReynolds	United States	2:39:18
7	Debbie Kilpatrick	United States	2:39:23
8	Päivi Tikkanen	Finland	2:39:36
9	Ritva Lemettinen	Finland	2:42:00
10	Sharon Stubler	United States	2:42:39
