= Sport in Kenya =

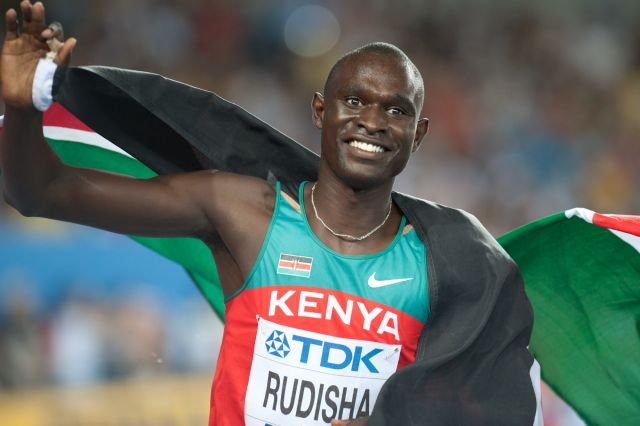
David Rudisha, the current world record holder in 800m and world champion.

Sport is an important element of Kenyan culture. Various indigenous traditional sports have prevailed in Kenyan culture from its earliest history. Some of the traditional games and sports prevalent in Kenya since antiquity have included wrestling, racing exercises, stick fights, hunting (using spears and arrows), board games, bull fights and dances.

Most modern sports in Kenya started during British colonisation. Professional teams in form of clubs were organised by colonial British settlers and Asian contractors as early as 1922, before the establishment of formal schools. Sports were introduced in schools in 1925. The syllabus for teaching sport through physical training in schools (extracurricular activity) was produced in 1935. Football and athletics (track and field) respectively were the first sports to be professionally organized.

Today, many sports are popular in Kenya, played both professionally and as recreational physical activities. The most popular sport in Kenya is football. Sports played in Kenya today include athletics (track & field and other running events), cricket, field hockey, motor sports, Association football, rugby union, volleyball, basketball, swimming and diving, team handball, netball, rounders, baseball, shooting, softball, bicycling, martial arts (boxing, Shotokan karate, Goju Ryu karate, Shorin Ryu karate, kickboxing, judo, Mantis kenPo and taekwondo), Lawn Tennis, Table Tennis, Squash, Badminton, Golf, Canoeing, Chess, Goal Ball, Horse Riding/Equestrianism, Polo, Weightlifting, Wrestling, Archery, Roller Sports, Ice Hockey and Mountain Sports – Kenya.

Globally, Kenya is mainly known for its dominance in middle-distance and long-distance races.

== Athletics (track & field and running events) ==
Athletics (track and field) was one of the two modern sports (together with football) to be formally organized in Kenya. Kenya has regularly produced Olympic and Commonwealth Games champions in various distance events, especially in 800 m, 1,500 m, 3,000 m steeplechase, 5,000 m, 10,000 m and the marathons. Kenyan athletes (particularly Kalenjin) continue to dominate the world of distance running, although competition from Morocco and Ethiopia has reduced this supremacy. Kenya's best-known athletes included the four-time women's Boston Marathon winner and two-time world champion Catherine Ndereba, former Marathon world record-holder Paul Tergat, and John Ngugi. The question of why Kenyans are so dominant in distance running has given rise to various explanations involving topography, or bone structure, or diet.

=== Track events ===
Retired Olympic and Commonwealth Games champion Kipchoge Keino helped usher in Kenya's ongoing distance dynasty 1970s and was followed by Commonwealth Champion Henry Rono's string of world record performances.

Kenya won several medals during the Beijing Olympics, 6 gold, 4 silver and 4 bronze, making it Africa's most successful Nation in the 2008 Olympics. New athletes gained attention, such as Pamela Jelimo, the women's 800m gold medalist who went ahead to win the Golden League jackpot, and Samuel Wanjiru who won the men's marathon.

=== Field events ===
Julius Yego became the first Kenyan field athlete to win a gold medal at the Commonwealth Games when he won the javelin title at the 2014 event in Glasgow (fellow Kenyan John Makaya had taken a bronze in the same event forty years earlier at the 1974 Commonwealths in Christchurch). The following year he took Kenya's first World Championship gold in the field at the 2015 World Championships in Athletics in Beijing, where he set a new Commonwealth record of 92.72m on his way to victory.

=== Cross country ===
Kenyan runners have dominated the IAAF World Cross Country Championships in the past quarter century, maintaining with Ethiopia a stranglehold on the event; from 1986 to 2011, the last year the race was held annually, the Kenyan men's team won 24 world championships, including 18 in a row until Ethiopia won in 2004–05. The junior men's team won 23 titles since 1988, and the women's team has won four straight since 2009. Kenya's junior women have won 15 world championships. Five times – in 1991 (Belgium), 1993 (Spain), 1995 (United Kingdom), 1996 (South Africa) and 2010 (Poland) – Kenya had the champions in the men's and women's senior and junior races.

Only three Kenyan men have won individual world cross country titles in the men's division, and two of them won multiple crowns. John Ngugi became the first man to win the world championship five times (1986–89, 1992). Countryman Paul Tergat became the first man to win five times in a row (1995–1999). Edith Masai won the 4-kilometer women's short race three consecutive times (2003–2004).

=== Marathons ===
Runners from Kenya have run seven of the 10 fastest times for 26.2 miles. They have also been among the most consistent winners in the World Marathon Majors: Boston, New York, London, Berlin, Chicago and Tokyo. An unusual number of marathon winners are Kalenjin.

==== Boston Marathon ====
Ibrahim Hussein won the first of his three Boston Marathon victories in 1988, less than a year after winning the New York City Marathon. Hussein would have back-to-back victories at Boston in 1991–92. Kenyan men broke the tape at the Boston Marathon 20 times since 1988, including 10 times in a row from 1991 to 2000. Kenyan women have 10 victories at Boston, four of them by one woman. The notable winners:

- Cosmas Ndeti, who won three in a row from 1993–95, running a course record 2:07:15 in 1994;
- Moses Tanui, a two-time winner in 1996 and 1998;
- Robert Kipkoech Cheruiyot, whose four victories (2003, 2006–08) make him and Bill Rodgers the race's only four-time winners in the men's division;
- Catherine Ndereba, the only four-time winner in the women's open division;
- Geoffrey Mutai, whose 2:03:02 winning time in 2011 is the fastest marathon time ever.
- Rita Jeptoo, who won in 2013 before the attack

==== New York City Marathon ====
Hussein's win in the New York City Marathon in the fall of 1987 was the first by a runner of African descent in the event. Three years later, Douglas Wakiihuri won the race that begins in Staten Island and goes through Queens, Brooklyn and the Bronx, ending in Manhattan's Central Park. Kenyan men won the race eight more times, and Kenyan women six in the open division. Among them:

- John Kagwe, winner of back-to-back titles (1997–98);
- Tegla Loroupe, who won in 1994 and repeated as champion the following year;
- Martin Lel, whose victories in New York came four years apart (2003, 2007);
- Geoffrey Mutai, the fastest marathoner ever, who set a course record (2:05:06) in winning the 2011 race;
- Margaret Okayo, whose victories in 2001 and 2003 were course records.

==== London Marathon ====
Douglas Wakiihuri won the race in 1989; it would be 15 years before another Kenyan, Evans Rutto, won in London. Martin Lel has three victories in the event and set a course record of 2:05:15 in 2008. Mary Keitany won back to back titles in 2011–12.

==== Chicago Marathon ====
The Chicago Marathon was first held in 1977. Runners from Kenya have won the men's open division 12 times, including nine in a row from 2003 to 2011.

- Evans Rutto (2003–04) and the late Samuel Wanjiru (2009–10) repeated as champions during that period.
- Joyce Chepchumba (1998–99) won consecutive titles in the women's open division; Catherine Ndereba won in 2000 and repeated in 2001 with a world women's record (2:18.47).

==== Berlin Marathon ====
Kenyan men have won the past three Berlin Marathon races (as of 2012) and 12 overall, including seven victories in a row from 1999 to 2005. Patrick Makau Musyoki won in consecutive years in 2010 and 2011, the latter in a world-record time of 2:03:38.

==== Tokyo Marathon ====
The newest of the World Marathon Majors, the first Tokyo Marathon was held in 2007. Daniel Njenga won the inaugural race in 2:09:45. Kenyan runners have won the race four times, including the 2013 champion Dennis Kimetto, who set a course record (2:06:50).

==== Olympic games ====
Samuel Wanjiru became the first Kenyan to become an Olympic champion in the marathon when he ran an Olympic Games record 2:06:32 to win the gold medal in Beijing in 2008.

- Douglas Wakiihuri would win the country's first marathon medal, a silver at the 1988 games in Seoul. Erick Wainaina won two medals, a bronze at the 1996 games in Atlanta and a silver at the 2000 games in Sydney.
- Catherine Ndereba would win consecutive silver medals in the women's marathon, in Athens (2004) and Beijing (2008).

=== Change of nationality ===
Lately, there has been controversy in Kenyan athletics circles, with the defection of a number of Kenyan athletes to represent other countries, chiefly Bahrain and Qatar. The Kenyan Ministry of Sports has tried to stop the defections, but they have continued anyway, with Bernard Lagat the latest, choosing to represent the United States. Most of these defections occur because of economic or financial factors however some elite Kenyan runners who cannot qualify for their country's strong national team also find it easier to qualify by running for other countries.

== Ball sports ==
=== Association football ===
Football is a popular spectator sport in Kenya. Kenya was a regional power in football, but its dominance has been eroded by wrangles within the Kenya Football Federation. This led to a suspension by FIFA which was lifted in March, 2007. Football in Kenya is currently controlled by the Football Kenya Federation. Kombii Betty Nanjalah one of the founders of Mathere Youth Sports Association (MYSA) – Kenya, First trip to Norway in 1991, with a group of 16 players who were from the streets of Nairobi. Trained as Football Referee.

=== Rugby union ===
Kenya is making a name for itself in rugby union. It is popular in Kenya especially with the annual Safari Sevens tournament. Kenya sevens team ranked 9th in IRB Sevens World Series for the 2006 season.

see also:

- Rugby union in Kenya
- Kenya Rugby Football Union
- Kenya national rugby union team
- Kenya women's national rugby union team
- Kenya national rugby sevens team
- Rugby Football Union of East Africa
- East Africa rugby union team
- Rugby league in Kenya

=== Volleyball ===
Kenya has also been a dominant force in ladies' volleyball within Africa, with Kenyan clubs winning 13 African Championships, and the national team leading the continental championship with 9 titles since 1991. The women's team has also competed at the Olympics and World Championships but without any notable success.

=== Basketball ===
Basketball is a popular sport in Kenya, especially among the youth. The country has traditionally been home to several successful players of the US-based NCAA, which is widely considered the world's strongest basketball league for College and University students. Notable players there include Joel Awich (Cal Poly), Tylor Ongwae (LA-Monroe) and Tom Wamukota (Wichita State). Yet, the number of Kenyans who play professionally for top teams in Europe and Asia is still low.

Kenya's national team had its best years between the mid-80s and the mid-90s when it qualified for the African Basketball Championship several times and even reached the Final Four in 1993 when Nairobi hosted the event.

In January 2021, Liz Mills took over Kenya's men's national team. Led by Mills, Kenya qualified for their first AfroBasket championship in 28 years. At the AfroBasket 2021 qualification, Kenya beat 11-time African champions Angola for the first time in history. At the 2021 FIBA AfroBasket Kenya finished 9th out of 16 teams.

=== Cricket ===
Cricket is another popular and the most successful team sport. Kenya has competed in the Cricket World Cup since 1996. They upset some of the world's best teams and reached semi-finals of the 2003 tournament. They also won the inaugural World Cricket League Division 1 hosted in Nairobi and participated in the World T20. As of January 2018, their captain is Rakep Patel.

=== Field Hockey ===
Field hockey is also played in Kenya. The Kenya men's national field hockey team had its best Hockey World Cup result in 1971, when it finished fourth.

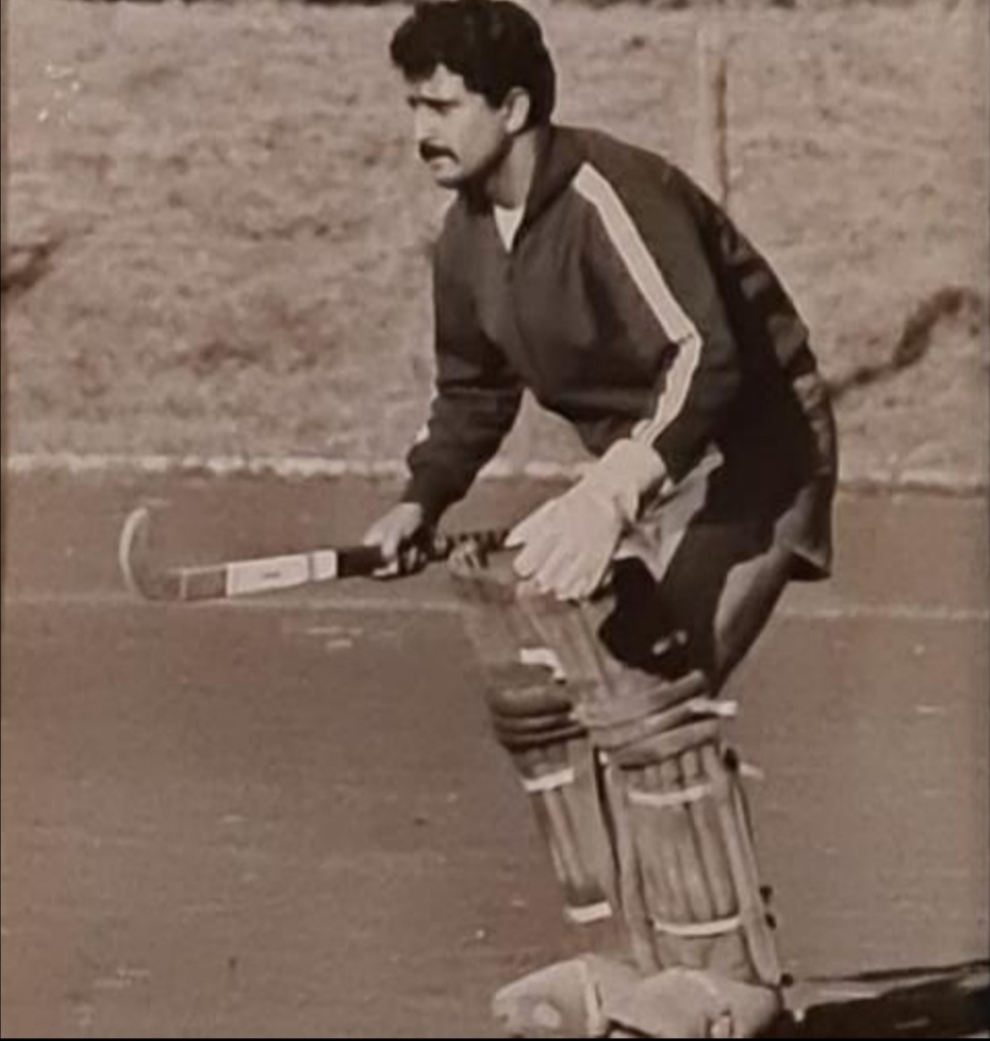
Roshan Ali, former goalkeeper of Kenya field hockey team.

The team also participated in the Summer Olympics seven times, finishing 6th in 1964. The home venue of the team is the City Park Hockey Stadium in Nairobi. The hockey sport in Kenya is overseen by the Kenya Hockey Union (KHU).

=== Lacrosse ===
As of April 2021, Kenya is one of four African members of the rapidly growing International Federation of Lacrosse.

For the first time, Kenya will feature a national team at the 2022 Under-19 World Lacrosse Championships.

=== Baseball ===
The Baseball Federation of Kenya (BFK) and Kenya Little League (KLL) has been promoting baseball in Kenya since 1992 and 2010 respectively. The sport was flourishing in the 90s before slowing down in the 2000s. Kenya has previously participated in the All Africa Games, the Kenko games in Zambia, and the World children's Baseball fair in Japan (4 times). Kenya hosted the World Cup U18 Africa Qualifiers at the Meru university of Science and Technology (MUST) from Dec 15–20, 2014. The sport is popular in Nairobi, Meru, Migori and Makueni. It is played in schools both Primary and Secondary, Colleges and Universities led by MUST. Solomon Gacece has been the long-serving chairman and with George Mahinda as the Secretary General.

The Kenya little League was chartered with Little League Baseball in Williamsport, PA, USA in 2010 and has been active in Meru before spreading to Nairobi and Mombasa. Currently about 24 Counties have baseball with Meru County reputing itself as the home of Baseball in Africa.

Baseball is picking up in the Eastern African countries of Kenya, Uganda, Tanzania, Ethiopia and Rwanda. The annual East Africa championships were held for the first time in Migori and expected to be held again. Kenya participated at the Olympics in Japan in 2020.

=== Softball ===
The Kenya Little League is promoting softball in addition to baseball in areas like Meru, Nairobi and Mombasa with Nairobi being the other softball hotspot.

Softball Federation of Kenya is promoting the sport especially at the universities.

== Motor sports ==
Motor sports in Kenya are governed by the Kenya Motor Sport Federation (KMSF). KMSF is affiliated to various world motor sports governing bodies including the International Motorcycling Federation (FIM) that governs motorcycle racing, and the Federation of International Automobile (FIA) an association that oversees motoring organizations, motor car users, and organizes World Rally Championships (WRC).

=== Rallying ===
The first professional motor sport in Kenya, the East African Coronation Safari was organized in celebration of Queen Elizabeth II's coronation on June 2, 1953. The annual rally was renamed the East African Safari Rally from 1954 to 1975 and the Safari Rally from 1975 to date. The 13-stage Safari Rally was included in the inaugural FIA organized World Rally Championships (WRC) as the fourth round of the 13 rounds that comprised the WRC rally season in 1973. Ian Duncan is the only Kenyan to ever win a WRC round, the Safari Rally in 1994.

The African Rally Championship (ARC) is a regional body of FIA and runs an annual rally season with eight rounds in eight countries (Zimbabwe, South Africa, Zambia, Kenya, Uganda, Tanzania, Rwanda, and Madagascar) from March to November, except in October. The Safari Rally was acknowledged as one of the toughest rallies in the world. The Kenyan legend, Shekhar Mehta/Nissan won the ARC inaugural season (1981) while Davis Horsey/Peugeot was the last Kenyan to win ARC in 1984.

Locally, the Kenya National Rally Champion is selected from the points accumulated in several KCB sponsored rounds. Ian Duncan is the 2011 KNR Champion. Patrick Njiru/David Williamson was the first African driver to win the Kenya National Rally Championship . He raced competitively last in 2002 before retiring from competitive racing. Njiru however continued to organize and participate in charity races. Ian Duncan is the most successful rally drivers in Kenya that continues to feature in various motor races to date. His Résumé is as follows: 1) The only Kenyan to win a WRC round (the 42nd Trust Bank Safari Rally, 1994), 2) He has won Kenyan Rally Championship six times (1987, 1988, 1989, 1991, 2000, and 2011), 3) He won the East African Classic Safari Rally in 2009 (racing in the same race in November, 2011), 4) He has won Guru Nanak Rally Championship 11 times, and 5) He won the Motorsport personality of the year 2010!

Prominent Kenyan-born legend drivers at the WRC series: Joginder Singh (1973–1980), Shekhar Mehta (1973–1987), Patrick Njiru (1983–1998), and Ian Duncan (1983–1999).

Other significant rally drivers in Kenya today: Carl Tundo, Azar Anwar, Lee Rose, Jas Mangat, and Ben Muchemi.

Some of the KNRC two-wheel drivers: James Kirimi, Patrick Kibara, Joe Muchiri, Adnan Suhail, and Niaz Bashir.

=== Motocross ===
In Kenya, motocross has the largest athlete pool among all motor sports. There are six categories in motocross: MX50, MX65, MX85, MX125, MX2, and the open class, MX1. Some of elite Kenya Motocross riders include Shivam Vinayak, Charles Mugo, Cruze Muigai, Anthony Nielsen, Mohammed Anwar, and Tutu Maina. Shivam is the most decorated motocross rider in Kenya with titles such as the MXI National Champion, FIM Central African Motocross Champion, and the Kenyan Motorcycle Cross-Country Champion. On August 28, 2011 during FIM Africa Motocross Championship in Harare, Zimbabwe, Kenya was represented by three riders (Tutu Maina (MX125), Dekker Kihara (MX50), and Rolf Kihara (MX65) and finished 4th out of the six countries represented. In October 14–16, 2011, Kenya hosted the FIM Africa Cross Country Bike and Quad Team Championships in the scenic Soysambu Conservancy in Nakuru.

=== Enduros and cross country ===
Kenya has annual Enduro championships such as National Enduro Championship, JCB/Ganatra Plant and Equipment Cross Country Rally Challenge. Kenya also takes part in the FIM Africa Enduro Championships. Shivam Vinayak is one of the Kenya's most elite Enduro biker who also doubles up in motocross. Enduro championships also attract the four-wheeler quad bikes also known as All Terrain Vehicles (ATV) with elite riders such as the defending champion Shazar Anwar, Murage Waigwa, Abid Ganatra, and Gurraj Singh. Enduro also welcomes Buggy Racing attracting some experienced rallying drivers such as Ian Duncan and Samir Khan.

=== Autocross ===
Both rally cars and buggies compete in Autocross in Kenya. The major championship is the National Autocross Championship. Keith Henrie is the 2011 National Autocross champion. Other autocross athletes in Kenya include Charles Mugo, Samir Khan, and Rajbir Rai. Rally drivers such as the legend Ben Muchemi and his compatriots Stella Macharia and Onkar Rai often participate in Autocross challenge.

=== Grand Prix karting ===
This is the last category of motor racing in Kenya. The Kenyan Grand Prix Karting uses go-karts for leisure races, a 500m race. The Karting organizers welcomes individuals, corporate, and schools to various competitions. Karting in Kenya however mainly focus fun and motor race experience.

== Water sports ==
=== Swimming and diving ===
Kenya has achieved great success in swimming considering it is an individual sport.

=== Canoeing ===
Competitive Canoe-kayak activities started in Kenya under the Kenya Rowing and Canoe Association, after affiliation to the International Canoe federation (ICF) in 2003 after Seifudin Patwa attended the ICF headquarters in 2003 in Madrid, Spain.

=== Rowing ===
Rowing was founded in Kenya during the colonial period with the founding of Mombasa Rowing Club in the 1930s in Liwatoni, Mombasa. This Club functioned as mainly a social club with occasional competitions with visiting Naval ships mainly British Navy, later with Kenya Navy however, the Club and rowing activities closed down in 1991 due to a land dispute with the neighbouring Fishing Company. Interest was again revived in early 1995 with the formation of Kenya Rowing Association, the national Body in charge, founded by Seifudin Patwa and Alisdair Macdonald, which was affiliated to the International Rowing federation (FISA) and National Olympic Committee and rowing activities restarted in the Tudor Creek, Mombasa.

Rowing Interest was revived within Kenya Navy while Mombasa Rowing Club relocated to Tudor Creek. In 2000, The Rowing team competed for the first time outside Kenya in the 4th Africa Rowing Championships in Pretoria South Africa with 8 rowers, all from Kenya Navy. In 2003, Canoeing was added as an activity to the national federation which then became Kenya Rowing and Canoe Association having been affiliated to International Canoe Federation(ICF) in the same year.

In 2003, Kenya qualified for the first time in the Rowing for the Athens 2004 Olympic Games in Single Scull category through Ibragim Githiga, a Kenya Navy soldier. Although his final result was not very good, it was a good step for the development of rowing in Kenya. Kenya further qualified gain in Single scull category in Beijing Olympic Games in 2008.

== Shooting sports ==
=== Target shooting ===
Although Kenya has sent shooters to the Olympic Games since 1956 (with interruptions), the discipline has remained a minority sport. Since the 1970s, Kenya's shooters are now distributed among approximately half African and half Indian. Famous past champions and Olympians are rifle shooter John Harun Mwau (now politician) and pistol shooter Shuaib Adam. The first Kenyan female ISSF shooter has now been seen abroad at the Commonwealth Games 2010 and the African Games 2011. The sport suffers from underfunding, lack of clubs, lack of coaches and an outdated firearms law, but has a modern range in Nairobi, and significant grass-roots talent that is not yet properly developed.

=== Archery ===
In Kenya archery has been practiced traditionally. It has been used in hunting, war and sports. In 2002 the Kenya association of archers was opened to cater for the growing problem of a platform where archers could compete in international sports. This also came with the formation of the Kenyan team of archers.

== Mountain sports ==
Mountain sport is the newest sport in Kenya. It is a combined sport-related individual and team challenges including distance running, High Ropes Course, Mountain Climbing and Abseiling, all done in the Jungle. The Mt. Kenya School of Adventure and Leadership (KESAL) held the inaugural Mountain Sports on October 22, 2011. The winners for the inaugural event were Benard Waweru – Men's 21 km Senior Jungle Race while the Senior Women's 21 km was won by the elite road runner Pauline Wangui. Sammy Ndungu won the Sky Marathon and The Kenya Methodist University (KEMU) won the Extreme Adventure title. See Mountain Sport-Kenya page for more details.

== Other individual sports ==
=== Boxing ===
Waruinge Nakayama is one of Kenya's foremost boxers. Born Philip Warunige, he changed his name as a result of moving to Japan. Wairunge won a silver medal as a Bantamweight in the 1972 Summer Olympics at Munich, Germany as an amateur, before embarking on a professional career that saw him almost crown himself a world champion, losing twice, for the WBC's world Super-Bantamweight title to Rigoberto Riasco and, later on, for the same organization's Bantamweight one, to Carlos Zarate. He also won the Japanese national Super-Bantamweight professional boxing championship.

=== Cycling ===
The Kenyan-born cyclist Chris Froome emerged in the early 2010s as one of the top road racing cyclists in the world, breaking through with runner-up finishes at the 2011 Vuelta a Espana and 2012 Tour de France before winning a bronze medal in the time trial at the 2012 Olympics and the 2013 Tour de France, becoming the first African-born rider to win the race. Froome rode as a Kenyan before switching his nationality to represent the United Kingdom before the 2008 Tour de France. He took his second Tour win in 2015 and a third the following year, followed by another time trial bronze at the 2016 Olympics. Froome was mentored by Kenyan professional cyclist David Kinjah in his early years.

A Kenyan cycling team, the Kenyan Riders, was founded in 2009 by Singaporean photographer Nicholas Leong after seeing Kenyan runners dominate the Singapore Marathon. In 2016 the Kenyan Riders merged with Pro Team Downunder to form Kenyan Riders Downunder, the first UCI Continental team to be registered in East Africa. René van Velhuijzen promotes a 1000 km Safari Oriented bicycle tour, thus drawing mountain bikers to Kenya for a life enriching experience. The Kenya Bicycle Safari.

=== Roller sports ===
Roller sports, mainly skating in Kenya are governed the Roller Sports Kenya Federation (RSKF). The federation was founded in 1997 and organizes various race categories such as roller speed skating, roller hockey, aggressive skating, and freestyle skating. KSKF is affiliated to the International Roller Sports Federation. The federation races/activities mainly take place at Moi International Sports Complex, Kasarani. There are 3 to 4 competitions every annually including the federation held its nationals, held in Bomet, Rift Valley (2011).

See also:

- FIRS Official Website:

== National sports organization ==
The Ministry of Sports, Culture and the Arts represents the highest organ in structural organization of sports in Kenya. The minister for sports implements policies on sports development, and debates sports bills in parliament. The commissioner of sports, within the Ministry of Sports acts as the government advisor on sports matters, drawing and evaluating policies, and maintaining standards within the Sport Department. Every district has a representation of government by Government Sports Officers.

The Kenya National Sports Council is formed by elected members from all sports in Kenya to ensure equity in development, promotion, and representation of all sports at all major competitions, national and international among other duties. The National Olympic Committee of Kenya (NOCK) prepares Kenyan athletes for the Olympics and works with other sports bodies in developing and promoting sports in the country.

== Collegiate sports organization ==
Kenya University Sports Federation (KUSF)is the governing body for Colleges and Universities Sports in Kenya.

== Scholastic sports organization ==
Kenya Primary Schools Sports Association (KPSSA) and Kenya Secondary Schools Sports Association are the governing bodies for sports in primary schools (class 1 to 8) and secondary schools (form 1 to 4)

== Youth sports ==
The raise of youth sports organizations in Kenya followed the failure physical education in schools. The first youth sport program, Mathare Youth Sports Association was formed in 1987. Since then, government agencies, non-governmental organizations (NGOs), and multilateral groups such as the UN, have continued to establish youth sport programs in densely populated urban areas giving the majority of Kenyan children opportunity to participate in sports.
