= 1989 Chicago Marathon =

Footrace held in Chicago, Illinois

12th Chicago Marathon
- Venue: Chicago, United States
- Dates: October 29

Champions
- Men: Paul Davies-Hale (2:11:25)
- Women: Lisa Rainsberger (2:28:15)

The 1989 Chicago Marathon was the 12th running of the annual marathon race in Chicago, United States and was held on October 29. The elite men's race was won by Britain's Paul Davies-Hale in a time of 2:11:25 hours and the women's race was won by America's Lisa Rainsberger in 2:28:15. A total of 5635 runners finished the race.

== Results ==
=== Men ===
Position	Athlete	Nationality	Time
1st place, gold medalist(s)	Paul Davies-Hale	United Kingdom	2:11:25
2nd place, silver medalist(s)	Ravil Kashapov	Soviet Union	2:13:19
3rd place, bronze medalist(s)	Dave Long	United Kingdom	2:13:37
4	Ed Eyestone	United States	2:14:57
5	Juan-Carlos Montero	Spain	2:15:15
6	Belayneh Tadesse	Ethiopia	2:15:19
7	Pedro Ortiz	Colombia	2:16:29
8	Gabriel Kamau	Kenya	2:17:02
9	Eddy Hellebuyck	Belgium	2:17:25
10	Salah Qoqaiche	Morocco	2:18:08
11	Håkan Börjesson	Sweden	2:18:18
12	Doug Kurtis	United States	2:18:31
13	El Mostafa Nechchadi	Morocco	2:18:45
14	Carlos Ayala	Mexico	2:18:45
15	Guido Genicco	Italy	2:18:49
16	Yakov Tolstikov	Soviet Union	2:19:12
17	Roy Dooney	Ireland	2:19:17
18	Isidro Rico	Mexico	2:20:00
19	Milfred Tewawina	United States	2:20:05
20	Maurizio Lorenzetti	Italy	2:21:04
—	Gerardo Alcalá	Mexico	DNF
—	Martín Pitayo	Mexico	DNF
—	Paul Gompers	United States	DNF
—	Steve Binns	United Kingdom	DNF

=== Women ===
Position	Athlete	Nationality	Time
1st place, gold medalist(s)	Lisa Rainsberger	United States	2:28:15
2nd place, silver medalist(s)	Carla Beurskens	Netherlands	2:30:24
3rd place, bronze medalist(s)	Cathy O'Brien	United States	2:31:19
4	Maria Rebelo	France	2:34:59
5	Carole Rouillard	Canada	2:35:20
6	Wanda Panfil	Poland	2:35:40
7	Cassandra Mihailovic	France	2:35:44
8	Jocelyne Villeton	France	2:36:55
9	Marguerite Buist	New Zealand	2:37:20
10	Kamila Gradus	Poland	2:37:37
11	Yekaterina Khramenkova	Soviet Union	2:38:38
12	Erin Baker	New Zealand	2:39:36
13	Odette Lapierre	Canada	2:41:04
14	Tammy Slusser	United States	2:43:03
15	Cesarina Taroni	Italy	2:44:04
16	Susan Stone	Canada	2:45:47
17	Luisa Romero	Mexico	2:46:10
18	Kellie Archuletta	United States	2:49:46
19	?	?	?
20	Charlene Soby	United States	2:54:52
