= 1993 Chicago Marathon =

Footrace held in Chicago, Illinois

16th Chicago Marathon
- Venue: Chicago, United States
- Dates: October 31

Champions
- Men: Luíz Antônio dos Santos (2:13:15)
- Women: Ritva Lemettinen (2:33:19)

The 1993 Chicago Marathon was the 16th running of the annual marathon race in Chicago, United States and was held on October 31. The elite men's race was won by Brazil's Luíz Antônio dos Santos in a time of 2:13:15 hours and the women's race was won by Finland's Ritva Lemettinen in 2:33:19.

== Results ==
=== Men ===
Position	Athlete	Nationality	Time
1	Luíz Antônio dos Santos	Brazil	2:13:15
2	Eddy Hellebuyck	Belgium	2:14:40
3	Antoni Niemczak	Poland	2:15:07
4	Reynaldo Ramirez	Mexico	2:15:47
5	Bruce Deacon	Canada	2:15:52
6	Jeff Jacobs	United States	2:16:00
7	Alfredo Vigueras	Mexico	2:16:10
8	Tesfaye Bekele	Ethiopia	2:16:18
9	Gumercindo Olmedo	Mexico	2:16:43
10	Tadeusz Ławicki	Poland	2:19:12

=== Women ===
Position	Athlete	Nationality	Time
1	Ritva Lemettinen	Finland	2:33:19
2	Linda Somers	United States	2:34:26
3	Silvana Pereira	Brazil	2:37:58
4	Danuta Bartoszek	Canada	2:38:16
5	Debra Gormley	United States	2:42:03
6	Suzanne Rigg	United Kingdom	2:45:00
7	Lyudmila Ilyina	Russia	2:46:41
8	Noeleen Wadden	Canada	2:47:21
9	Bridget Collins	United States	2:53:07
10	Cynthia Woods	United States	2:54:49
