= 1999 Chicago Marathon =

Footrace held in Chicago, Illinois

22nd Chicago Marathon
- Venue: Chicago, United States
- Dates: October 24

Champions
- Men: Khalid Khannouchi (2:05:42)
- Women: Joyce Chepchumba (2:25:59)

The 1999 Chicago Marathon was the 22nd running of the annual marathon race in Chicago, United States and was held on October 24. The elite men's race was won by Morocco's Khalid Khannouchi in a time of 2:05:42 hours and the women's race was won by Kenya's Joyce Chepchumba in 2:25:59. Khannouchi's winning time was a marathon world record, and only his third outing over the distance. That record stood for two and a half years before the Moroccan beat it again at the 2002 London Marathon.

== Results ==
=== Men ===
| Position | Athlete | Nationality | Time |
|---|---|---|---|
| 1 | Khalid Khannouchi | Morocco | 2:05:42 WR |
| 2 | Moses Tanui | Kenya | 2:06:16 |
| 3 | Ondoro Osoro | Kenya | 2:08:00 |
| 4 | David Morris | United States | 2:09:32 |
| 5 | Simon Kipruto Bor | Kenya | 2:09:35 |
| 6 | Éder Fialho | Brazil | 2:09:36 |
| 7 | Joseph Kahugu | Kenya | 2:09:37 |
| 8 | James Kariuki | Kenya | 2:11:14 |
| 9 | Simon Lopuyet | Kenya | 2:11:18 |
| 10 | Thabiso Paul Moqhali | Lesotho | 2:11:44 |

=== Women ===
| Position | Athlete | Nationality | Time |
|---|---|---|---|
| 1 | Joyce Chepchumba | Kenya | 2:25:59 |
| 2 | Margaret Okayo | Kenya | 2:26:00 |
| 3 | Elana Meyer | South Africa | 2:27:17 |
| 4 | Colleen De Reuck | South Africa | 2:27:30 |
| 5 | Irina Bogacheva | Kyrgyzstan | 2:27:46 |
| 6 | Libbie Hickman | United States | 2:28:34 |
| 7 | Marian Sutton | United Kingdom | 2:28:42 |
| 8 | Renata Paradowska | Poland | 2:31:59 |
| 9 | Albina Gallyamova | Russia | 2:32:24 |
| 10 | Kristy Johnston | United States | 2:32:34 |
