= 1998 Chicago Marathon =

Footrace held in Chicago, Illinois

21st Chicago Marathon
- Venue: Chicago, United States
- Dates: October 11

Champions
- Men: Ondoro Osoro (2:06:54)
- Women: Joyce Chepchumba (2:23:57)

The 1998 Chicago Marathon was the 21st running of the annual marathon race in Chicago, United States and was held on October 11. The elite men's race was won by Kenya's Ondoro Osoro in a time of 2:06:54 hours and the women's race was won in 2:23:57 by Joyce Chepchumba, also of Kenya.

== Results ==
=== Men ===
Position	Athlete	Nationality	Time
1	Ondoro Osoro	Kenya	2:06:53
2	Khalid Khannouchi	Morocco	2:07:19
3	Gert Thys	South Africa	2:07:45
4	Joseph Kahugu	Kenya	2:07:59
5	Moses Tanui	Kenya	2:09:43
6	Éder Fialho	Brazil	2:09:48
7	Philip Chirchir	Kenya	2:09:52
8	Shinji Kawashima	Japan	2:10:07
9	Silvio Guerra	Ecuador	2:10:17
10	Elijah Lagat	Kenya	2:10:32

=== Women ===
Position	Athlete	Nationality	Time
1	Joyce Chepchumba	Kenya	2:23:57
2	Colleen De Reuck	South Africa	2:27:04
3	Elana Meyer	South Africa	2:27:20
4	Kayoko Obata	Japan	2:28:39
5	Tatyana Pozdnyakova	Russia	2:29:25
6	Irina Bogacheva	Kyrgyzstan	2:30:34
7	Gitte Karlshøj	Denmark	2:31:57
8	Kristy Johnston	United States	2:32:37
9	Linda Somers	United States	2:34:21
10	Marian Sutton	United Kingdom	2:35:41
