= 2005 Chicago Marathon =

Marathon in Chicago

28th Chicago Marathon
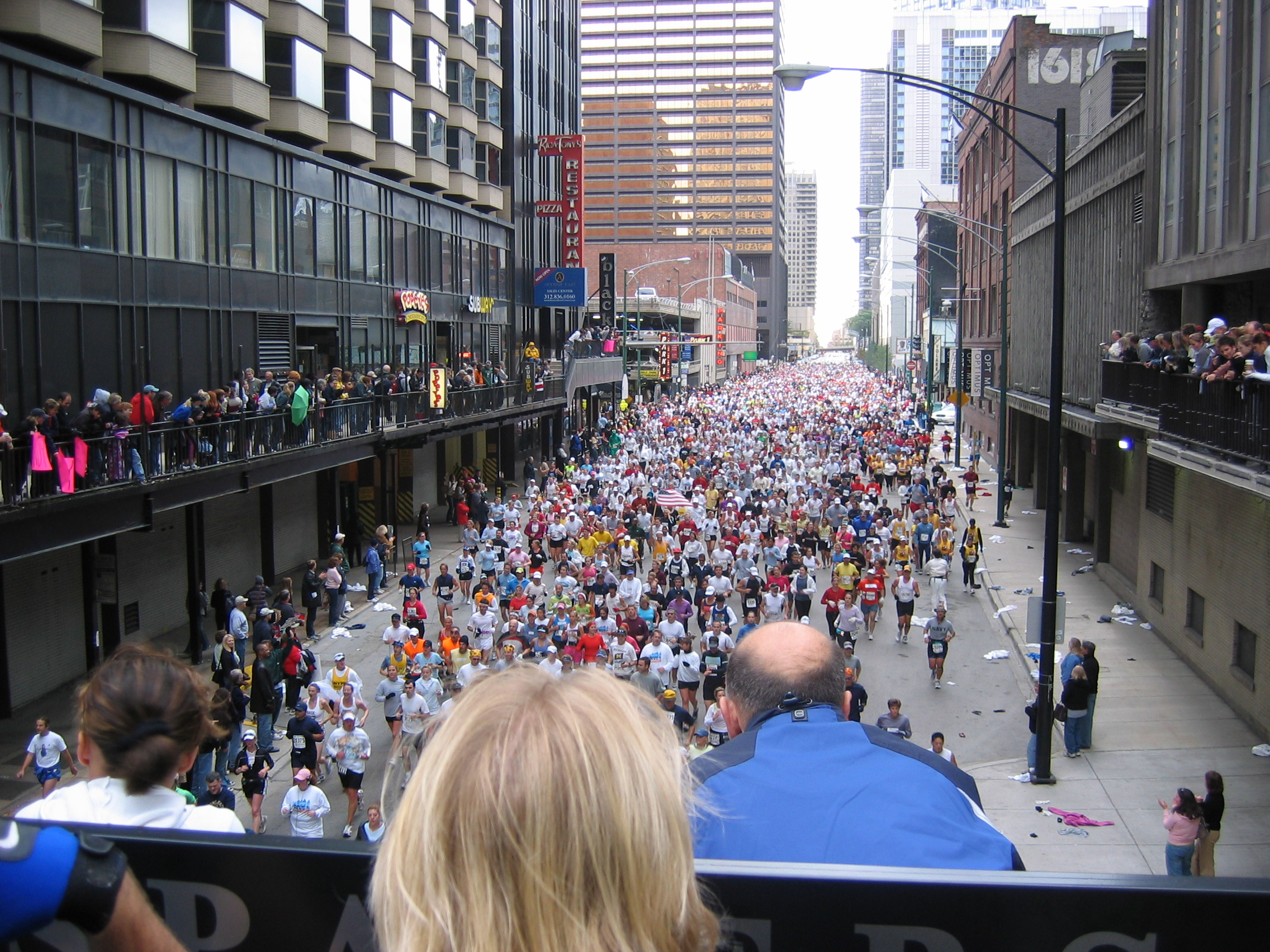
- Runners at the start of the race
- Venue: Chicago, United States
- Dates: October 9

Champions
- Men: Felix Limo (2:07:02)
- Women: Deena Kastor (2:21:25)

The 2005 Chicago Marathon was the 28th running of the annual marathon race in Chicago, United States and was held on October 9. The elite men's race was won by Kenya's Felix Limo in a time of 2:07:02 hours and the women's race was won by home athlete Deena Kastor in 2:21:25.

== Results ==
=== Men ===
Position	Athlete	Nationality	Time
1	Felix Limo	Kenya	2:07:02
2	Benjamin Maiyo	Kenya	2:07:09
3	Daniel Njenga	Kenya	2:07:14
4	Evans Rutto	Kenya	2:07:28
5	Patrick Ivuti	Kenya	2:07:46
6	Laban Kipkemboi	Kenya	2:09:22
7	William Kipsang	Kenya	2:09:49
8	Timothy Cherigat	Kenya	2:10:34
9	Sammy Korir	Kenya	2:10:53
10	John Gwako	Kenya	2:12:30

=== Women ===
Position	Athlete	Nationality	Time
1	Deena Kastor	United States	2:21:25
2	Constantina Diță	Romania	2:21:30
3	Masako Chiba	Japan	2:26:00
4	Colleen De Reuck	United States	2:28:40
5	Eri Hayakawa	Japan	2:28:50
6	Blake Russell	United States	2:29:10
7	Kathy Butler	United Kingdom	2:30:01
8	Tatyana Petrova Arkhipova	Russia	2:31:03
9	Kate Smyth	Australia	2:33:42
10	Grażyna Syrek	Poland	2:36:32
