= Irina Timofeyeva =

Russian long-distance runner

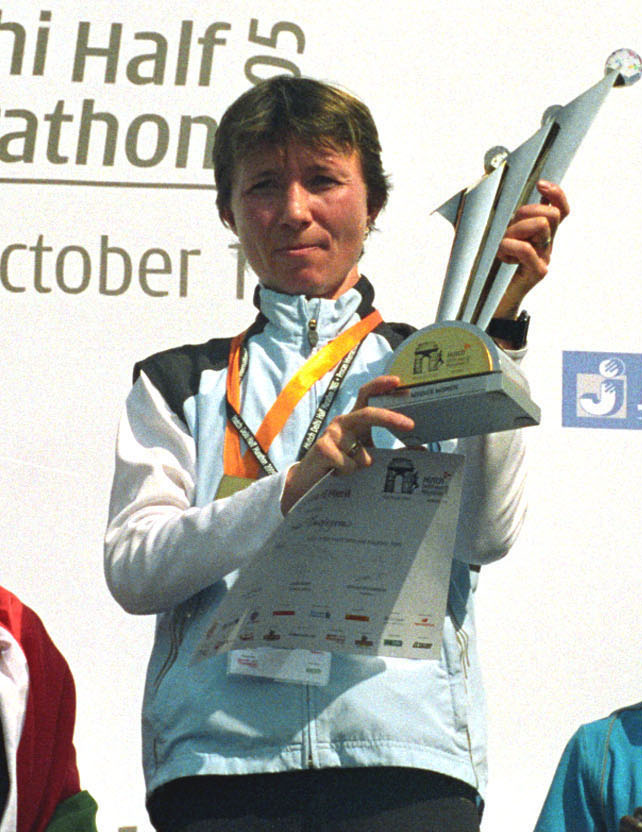
- Irina Timofeyeva at New Delhi half marathon in 2005

Personal information
- Born: 5 April 1970 (age 55) Ibresinsky District, Chuvash ASSR, Russian SFSR, Soviet Union
- Height: 1.64 m (5 ft 4 1/2 in)
- Weight: 48 kg (106 lb)

Sport
- Country: Russia
- Sport: Athletics
- Event: Marathon

Irina Nikolayevna Timofeyeva (Russian: Ирина Николаевна Тимофеева; born 5 April 1970) is a Russian former long-distance runner who specialized in running the marathon.

She won the Singapore Marathon in 2005 and the Paris Marathon in 2006. She ran for Russia at the 2008 Summer Olympics, placing seventh in the marathon race. She won the Nagano Olympic Commemorative Marathon in 2009.

She was banned from the sport for two years, starting 6 September 2016, due to abnormalities in her biological passport.

== International competitions ==
Representing Russia
| Year | Competition | Venue | Position | Event | Result | Notes |
|---|---|---|---|---|---|---|
| 1997 | World Championships | Athens, Greece | 41st | Marathon | 2:53:01 | |
| 1998 | European Championships | Budapest, Hungary | 18th | Marathon | 2:34:44 | |
| 2001 | World Championships | Edmonton, Canada | 11th | Marathon | 2:30:48 | |
| 2002 | European Championships | Munich, Germany | 13th | Marathon | 2:40:11 | |
| 2003 | World Championships | Paris, France | 40th | Marathon | 2:38:06 | |
| 2008 | Olympic Games | Beijing, China | 7th | Marathon | 2:27:31 | |
| 2010 | European Championships | Barcelona, Spain | 9th | Marathon | 2:35:53 | |

== Professional marathons ==
| Year | Competition | Venue | Position | Result | Notes |
|---|---|---|---|---|---|
| 2000 | Chicago Marathon | Chicago, United States | 3rd | Marathon | 2:29:13 |
| 2001 | Tokyo Marathon | Tokyo, Japan | 2nd | Marathon | 2:25:29 |
| 2005 | Mumbai Marathon | Mumbai, India | 3rd | Marathon | 2:36:42 |
| 2005 | Paris Marathon | Paris, France | 7th | Marathon | 2:30:11 |
| 2005 | Singapore Marathon | Singapore | 1st | Marathon | 2:34:37 |
| 2006 | Paris Marathon | Paris, France | 1st | Marathon | 2:27:19 |
| 2006 | Singapore Marathon | Singapore | 2nd | Marathon | 2:34:35 |
| 2007 | Berlin Marathon | Berlin, Germany | 4th | Marathon | 2:26:54 |
| 2008 | Hamburg Marathon | Hamburg, Germany | 1st | Marathon | 2:24:14 |
| 2008 | Shanghai Marathon | Shanghai, China | 1st | Marathon | 2:26:19 |
| 2009 | Nagano Marathon | Nagano, Japan | 1st | Marathon | 2:30:07 |
| 2009 | Shanghai Marathon | Shanghai, China | 4th | Marathon | 2:33:31 |

== See also ==
- List of doping cases in athletics
