= 1986 Chicago Marathon =

Footrace held in Chicago, Illinois

10th Chicago Marathon
- Venue: Chicago, United States
- Dates: October 26

Champions
- Men: Toshihiko Seko (2:08:27)
- Women: Ingrid Kristiansen (2:27:08)

The 1986 Chicago Marathon was the tenth running of the annual marathon race in Chicago, United States, and was held on October 26. The elite men's race was won by Japan's Toshihiko Seko in a time of 2:08:27 hours, and the women's race was won by Norway's Ingrid Kristiansen in 2:27:08. A total of 8173 runners finished the race, an increase of over 600 from the previous year, and a number that would not be beaten until 1995.

== Results ==
=== Men ===
Position	Athlete	Nationality	Time
1st place, gold medalist(s)	Toshihiko Seko	Japan	2:08:27
2nd place, silver medalist(s)	Hussein Ahmed Salah	Djibouti	2:09:57
3rd place, bronze medalist(s)	Charlie Spedding	United Kingdom	2:10:13
4	Michael Musyoki	Kenya	2:10:30
5	Herbert Steffny	West Germany	2:11:17
6	John Burra	Tanzania	2:13:36
7	Paul Williams	Canada	2:13:59
8	Jürgen Dächert	West Germany	2:14:27
9	José Gómez	Mexico	2:14:58
10	Rodolfo Gómez	Mexico	2:15:02
11	Bill Rodgers	United States	2:15:31
12	Allister Hutton	United Kingdom	2:15:57
13	Martti Vainio	Finland	2:16:41
14	Michael Buhmann	United States	2:16:46
15	Werner Grommisch	West Germany	2:16:57
16	Sid-Ali Sakhri	Algeria	2:17:04
17	Mark Curp	United States	2:17:16
18	Bruce Wainman	Canada	2:17:19
19	Pablo Vigil	United States	2:17:51
20	Tommy Ekblom	Finland	2:18:03

=== Women ===
Position	Athlete	Nationality	Time
1st place, gold medalist(s)	Ingrid Kristiansen	Norway	2:27:08
2nd place, silver medalist(s)	Maria Rebelo	France	2:29:51
3rd place, bronze medalist(s)	Priscilla Welch	United Kingdom	2:31:14
4	Deborah Raunig	United States	2:31:28
5	Maureen Roben	United States	2:34:41
6	Gail Kingma	United States	2:35:43
7	Tuija Toivonen	Finland	2:36:48
8	Carina Leutner	Austria	2:37:09
9	Dorothy Goertzen	Canada	2:40:34
10	Solweig Harrysson	Sweden	2:43:24
11	Beth Farmer	United States	2:44:39
12	Karen Bukowski	United States	2:47:16
13	Gillian Beschloss	United Kingdom	2:47:28
14	Joanne Scianna	United States	2:48:12
15	Bridgid Williams	United States	2:49:45
16	Francesca Negri	United States	2:49:59
17	Diane Stoneking	United States	2:51:11
20	Charlene Soby	United States	2:53:22
—	Lisa Rainsberger	United States	DNF
