= 1994 Chicago Marathon =

17th running of the Chicago Marathon

17th Chicago Marathon
- Venue: Chicago, United States
- Dates: October 30

Champions
- Men: Luíz Antônio dos Santos (2:11:16)
- Women: Kristy Johnston (2:31:34)

The 1994 Chicago Marathon was the 17th running of the annual marathon race in Chicago, United States and was held on October 30. The elite men's race was won by Brazil's Luíz Antônio dos Santos in a time of 2:11:16 hours and the women's race was won by home athlete Kristy Johnston in 2:31:34.

== Results ==
=== Men ===
Position	Athlete	Nationality	Time
1	Luíz Antônio dos Santos	Brazil	2:11:16
2	Ed Eyestone	United States	2:11:51
3	Patrick Muturi	Kenya	2:12:56
4	Ovidio Castilla	Mexico	2:13:09
5	Don Janicki	United States	2:13:21
6	Hector De Jesus	Mexico	2:13:35
7	Jeff Jacobs	United States	2:13:44
8	Alejandro Cruz	Mexico	2:14:33
9	Carey Nelson	Canada	2:15:21
10	Daniel Martínez	United States	2:16:07

=== Women ===
Position	Athlete	Nationality	Time
1	Kristy Johnston	United States	2:31:34
2	Gitte Karlshøj	Denmark	2:31:57
3	Elaine Van Blunk	United States	2:32:25
4	Trina Painter	United States	2:35:21
5	Lisa Rainsberger	United States	2:36:35
6	Joan Benoit	United States	2:37:09
7	María Trujillo	United States	2:37:25
8	Ingmarie Nilsson	Sweden	2:39:43
9	Lyubov Klochko	Ukraine	2:40:09
10	Amy Legacki	United States	2:40:18
