= Felix Limo =

Kenyan long-distance runner

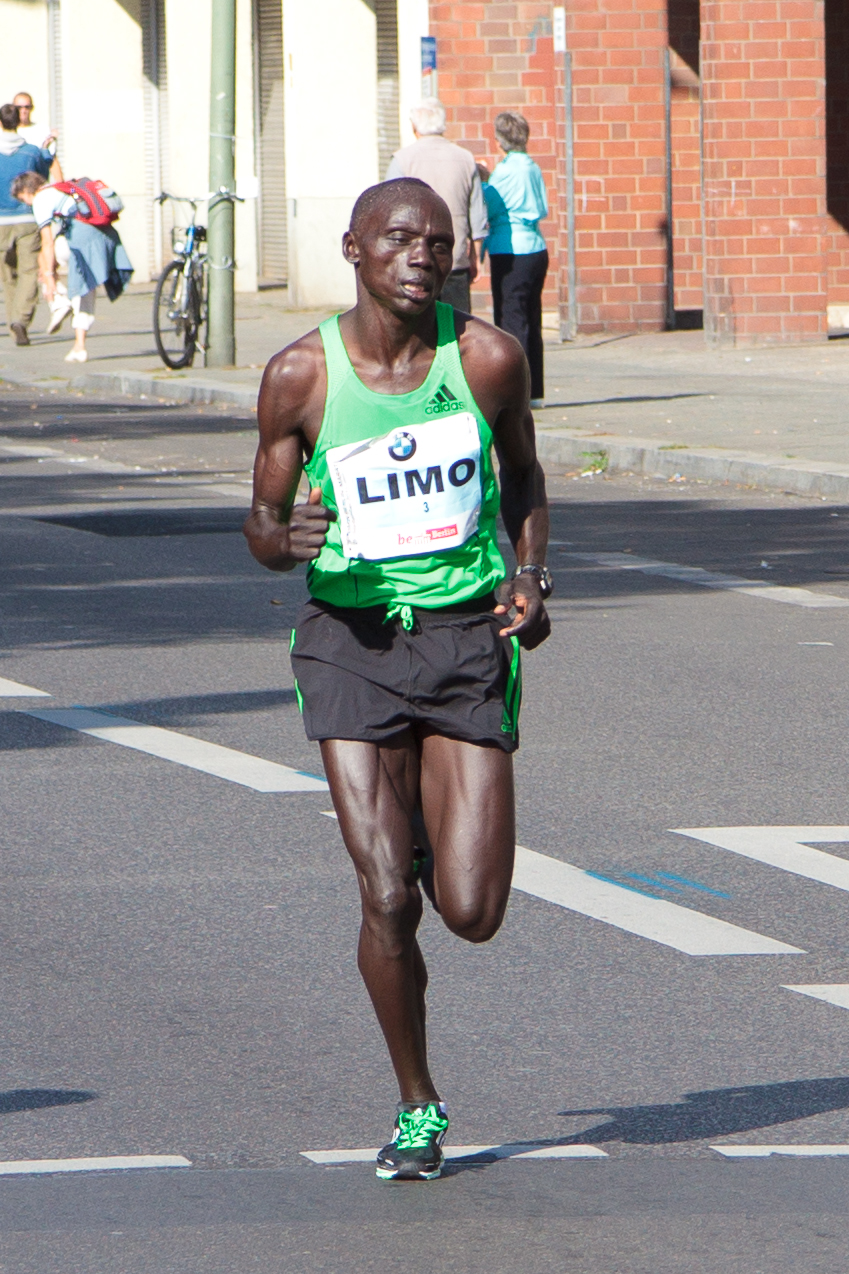
- Limo at the Berlin Marathon 2011

Personal information
- Born: 22 August 1980 (age 45)

Sport
- Country: Kenya
- Sport: Athletics

Felix Limo (born 22 August 1980) is a Kenyan former long-distance runner, who specialized in the marathon.

Limo held the 15 Kilometres road running world record from November 2001 to November 2010, where he lost the record to Leonard Komon. Limo set his record of 41:29 minutes in Nijmegen, the Netherlands when winning the Zevenheuvelenloop race. Deriba Merga of Ethiopia equalled the time in 2009.

He won the Portugal Half Marathon in 2002. He debuted at the 2003 Amsterdam Marathon, finishing second timing 2:06.42, only three seconds slower than William Kipsang, who set a course record.

Limo has achieved victory at the 2005 Chicago Marathon, as well as at Berlin and Rotterdam in 2004. In winning the 2004 Rotterdam Marathon, he ran arguably his strongest effort, setting his personal best of 2:06:14. Not only was that the eleventh fastest marathon ever run, but it was achieved on a very windy day. Limo withdrew from a possible defense of his Chicago Marathon title due to back pain, and the 2006 race was won by Robert Kipkoech Cheruiyot.

He won the 2006 London Marathon in a time of 2:06:39, the third fastest of 2006. He returned the following year and recorded 2:07:47 for third place.

His performances deteriorated significantly from 2008 onwards as he rarely bettered two hours and ten minutes. In 2008 he was eighth in London and fifth in Fukuoka. His 2009 saw little improvement as he came tenth in London and then seventh in Seoul. His sole competition in 2010 was the Vienna Marathon and his time of 2:11:34 brought him seventh place. Limo was sixth at the 2011 Tokyo Marathon, finishing in a time of 2:10:50.

He decided to retire from the sport at the start of 2013. Back problems had reduced his capacity to train and he felt the very top level was now beyond him: "I feel confident I could still run marathons in 2:09 or 2:10 [but] those times are not going to get me into the top three of the best marathons these days". He paid tribute to his coach, Patrick Sang, and said that he hoped to spend more time with his family and managing his business portfolio.

Felix is not related to world champion Richard Limo, but might be distantly related to another Kenyan runner, Benjamin Limo.

== Marathons ==
Year	Competition	Venue	Position	Notes
Representing Kenya
2003	Amsterdam Marathon	Amsterdam, Netherlands	2nd	2:06:42
2004	Rotterdam Marathon	Rotterdam, Netherlands	1st	2:06:14
2004	Berlin Marathon	Berlin, Germany	1st	2:06:44
2005	Rotterdam Marathon	Rotterdam, Netherlands	3rd	2:09:01
2005	Chicago Marathon	Chicago, United States	1st	2:07:02
2006	London Marathon	London, United Kingdom	1st	2:06:39
2007	London Marathon	London, United Kingdom	3rd	2:07:47
2008	London Marathon	London, United Kingdom	8th	2:10:35
2008	Fukuoka Marathon	Fukuoka, Japan	5th	2:10:59
2009	London Marathon	London, United Kingdom	10th	2:09:47
2009	Seoul Marathon	Seoul, South Korea	7th	2:13:13
2010	Vienna City Marathon	Vienna, Austria	7th	2:11:34
2011	Tokyo Marathon	Tokyo, Japan	5th	2:10:50
2011	Berlin Marathon	Berlin, Germany	4th	2:10:38

Sporting positions
Preceded by Mohammed Mourhit	Men's Zevenheuvelenloop Winner (15 km); 2000–2001	Succeeded by Kamiel Maase
Preceded by Evans Rutto	Men's Chicago Marathon winner 2005	Succeeded by Robert Kipkoech Cheruiyot
