= 2003 Chicago Marathon =

Footrace held in Chicago, Illinois

26th Chicago Marathon
- Venue: Chicago, United States
- Dates: October 12

Champions
- Men: Evans Rutto (2:05:50)
- Women: Svetlana Zakharova (2:23:07)

The 2003 Chicago Marathon was the 26th running of the annual marathon race in Chicago, United States and was held on October 12. The elite men's race was won by Kenya's Evans Rutto in a time of 2:05:50 hours and the women's race was won by Russia's Svetlana Zakharova in 2:23:07.

== Results ==
=== Men ===
Position	Athlete	Nationality	Time
1	Evans Rutto	Kenya	2:05:50
2	Paul Koech	Kenya	2:07:07
3	Daniel Njenga	Kenya	2:07:41
4	Peter Chebet	Kenya	2:08:43
5	Jimmy Muindi	Kenya	2:08:57
6	Abdelkader El Mouaziz	Morocco	2:09:38
7	Meb Keflezighi	United States	2:10:03
8	Hendrick Ramaala	South Africa	2:10:55
9	Sisay Bezabeh	Australia	2:11:08
10	Josephat Kiprono	Kenya	2:11:30

=== Women ===
Position	Athlete	Nationality	Time
1	Svetlana Zakharova	Russia	2:23:07
2	Constantina Diță	Romania	2:23:35
3	Jeļena Prokopčuka	Latvia	2:24:53
4	Albina Ivanova	Russia	2:25:35
5	Grażyna Syrek	Poland	2:26:22
6	Małgorzata Sobańska	Poland	2:27:50
7	Colleen De Reuck	United States	2:28:01
8	Madina Biktagirova	Russia	2:28:33
9	Nuța Olaru	Romania	2:29:00
10	Deeja Youngquist	United States	2:29:01
