= 2004 Chicago Marathon =

Footrace held in Chicago, Illinois

27th Chicago Marathon
- Venue: Chicago, United States
- Dates: October 10

Champions
- Men: Evans Rutto (2:06:44)
- Women: Constantina Diță (2:23:44)

The 2004 Chicago Marathon was the 27th running of the annual marathon race in Chicago, United States and was held on October 10. The elite men's race was won by Kenya's Evans Rutto in a time of 2:06:44 hours and the women's race was won by Romania's Constantina Diță in 2:23:44.

== Results ==
=== Men ===
Position	Athlete	Nationality	Time
1	Evans Rutto	Kenya	2:06:16
2	Daniel Njenga	Kenya	2:07:44
3	Toshinari Takaoka	Japan	2:07:50
4	Jimmy Muindi	Kenya	2:08:27
5	Khalid Khannouchi	United States	2:08:44
6	Marílson Gomes dos Santos	Brazil	2:08:48
7	Stephen Kiogora	Kenya	2:09:21
8	Scott Westcott	Australia	2:13:08
9	Benjamin Maiyo	Kenya	2:13:17
10	Paul Koech	Kenya	2:13:20

=== Women ===
Position	Athlete	Nationality	Time
1	Constantina Diță	Romania	2:23:45
2	Nuța Olaru	Romania	2:24:33
3	Svetlana Zakharova	Russia	2:25:01
4	Joyce Chepchumba	Kenya	2:26:21
5	Albina Ivanova	Russia	2:28:22
6	Shitaye Gemechu	Ethiopia	2:28:28
7	Marla Runyan	United States	2:28:33
8	Derartu Tulu	Ethiopia	2:30:21
9	Blake Russell	United States	2:32:04
10	Jenny Spangler	United States	2:33:36
