= Mark Curp =

American long-distance runner

Personal information
- Nationality: American
- Born: January 5, 1959 (age 67) Chillicothe, Missouri

Sport
- Sport: Long-distance running
- College team: Central Missouri Mules and Jennies

Mark Curp (born January 5, 1959, in Chillicothe, Missouri) held the world record for the half marathon from 1985 until 1990. He continued holding the American record in the half marathon until a new record was set by Ryan Hall in 2007.

Curp attended Central Missouri State University, receiving a bachelor's degree in 1981 and a master's degree in 1982.

Curp broke the men's world record in the half marathon on September 15, 1985, clocking 1:00:55 at the Philadelphia Distance Run in Philadelphia, Pennsylvania, at an overall pace just under 4:39 per mile for the official 13.1094-mile distance. According to the Missouri Sports Hall of Fame, "in 1987 and 1988, Runner's World magazine ranked him the number one road racer in the world." (Curp's best time in a marathon came at the 1987 Twin Cities Marathon, when he finished third with a time of 2:11:45.)

Curp's world record in the half marathon stood for five years, until September 16, 1990, when Dionicio Ceron of Mexico broke Curp's time by nine seconds on the same Philadelphia course.

Curp's time of 1:00:55 stood as the American record until January 14, 2007, when Ryan Hall broke the record at the Aramco Houston Half-Marathon in Houston, Texas.

== Achievements ==
- All results regarding marathon, unless stated otherwise

Year	Competition	Venue	Position	Notes
Representing the United States
1986	Chicago Marathon	Chicago, United States	17th	2:17:16
1987	Twin Cities Marathon	Minneapolis, U.S.A.	3rd	2:11:45
1988	U.S. Olympic Trials	Jersey City, United States	5th	2:14:40
1990	Columbus Marathon	Columbus, United States	2nd	2:12:38
1991	Pan Am Games	Havana, Cuba	DNF	- -
1992	Toronto Marathon	Toronto, Canada	4th	2:14:56
1993	Twin Cities Marathon	Minneapolis, U.S.A.	4th	2:15:33
1995	Grandma's Marathon	Duluth, United States	1st	2:15:23

Records
Preceded by (South Africa) Xolile Yawa	Men's Half Marathon World Record Holder; September 15, 1985 – September 16, 1990	Succeeded by (Mexico) Dionicio Cerón
Sporting positions
Preceded by Alberto Cova	Men's Half Marathon Best Year Performance; 1985	Succeeded by Michael Musyoki
