= 1990 Chicago Marathon =

Footrace held in Chicago, Illinois

13th Chicago Marathon
- Venue: Chicago, United States
- Dates: October 28

Champions
- Men: Martín Pitayo (2:09:41)
- Women: Aurora Cunha (2:30:11)

The 1990 Chicago Marathon was the 13th running of the annual marathon race in Chicago, United States and was held on October 28. The elite men's race was won by Mexico's Martín Pitayo in a time of 2:09:41 hours and the women's race was won by Portugal's Aurora Cunha in 2:30:11.

== Results ==
=== Men ===
Position	Athlete	Nationality	Time
1	Martín Pitayo	Mexico	2:09:41
2	Antoni Niemczak	Poland	2:09:41
3	Rex Wilson	New Zealand	2:10:48
4	Åke Eriksson	Sweden	2:10:53
5	Ed Eyestone	United States	2:10:59
6	Jan Huruk	Poland	2:11:26
7	Joaquim Pinheiro	Portugal	2:12:03
8	Osmiro Silva	Brazil	2:12:17
9	Dionicio Cerón	Mexico	2:12:18
10	Viktor Mosgovoy	Soviet Union	2:13:27
11	Spyros Andriopoulos	Greece	2:13:47

=== Women ===
Position	Athlete	Nationality	Time
1	Aurora Cunha	Portugal	2:30:11
2	Carole Rouillard	Canada	2:32:28
3	Midde Hamrin	Sweden	2:34:27
4	Helen Moros	New Zealand	2:34:37
5	Kellie Archuletta	United States	2:35:58
6	Mary Knisely	United States	2:37:58
7	Deborah Raunig	United States	2:38:07
8	Joy Smith	United States	2:38:22
9	Terry Schmidt	United States	2:38:42
10	Anne Roden	United Kingdom	2:38:55
