= 2000 Chicago Marathon =

Footrace held in Chicago, Illinois

23rd Chicago Marathon
- Venue: Chicago, United States
- Dates: October 22

Champions
- Men: Khalid Khannouchi (2:07:01)
- Women: Catherine Ndereba (2:21:33)

The 2000 Chicago Marathon was the 23rd running of the annual marathon race in Chicago, United States and was held on October 22. The elite men's race was won by Morocco's Khalid Khannouchi in a time of 2:07:01 hours and the women's race was won by Kenya's Catherine Ndereba in 2:21:33.

== Results ==
=== Men ===
Position	Athlete	Nationality	Time
1	Khalid Khannouchi	United States	2:07:01
2	Josephat Kiprono	Kenya	2:07:29
3	Moses Tanui	Kenya	2:07:47
4	Peter Githuka	Kenya	2:08:02
5	Fred Kiprop	Kenya	2:08:23
6	William Kiplagat	Kenya	2:11:57
7	David Morris	United States	2:12:00
8	Eric Mack	United States	2:12:42
9	Kim Yi-yong	South Korea	2:13:02
10	Josh Cox	United States	2:13:55

=== Women ===
Position	Athlete	Nationality	Time
1	Catherine Ndereba	Kenya	2:21:33
2	Lornah Kiplagat	Kenya	2:22:36
3	Irina Timofeyeva	Russia	2:29:13
4	Elana Meyer	South Africa	2:31:59
5	Kayoko Obata	Japan	2:31:59
6	Libbie Hickman	United States	2:32:09
7	Christine Junkerman	United States	2:32:45
8	Kristy Johnston	United States	2:33:20
9	Marie Söderström-Lundberg	Sweden	2:34:58
10	Ann Schaefers Coles	United States	2:37:48
