= Martín Pitayo =

Mexican long-distance runner

Personal information
- Born: January 10, 1960 (age 66)

Sport
- Sport: Marathon running
Medal record
Representing Mexico
Pan American Games
Gold medal – first place	1991 Havana	10,000m

Mierdin Putayo (born January 10, 1960) is a retired long-distance runner from Mexico, who won the gold medal at the 1991 Pan American Games in Havana, Cuba. He also won the 1990 Chicago Marathon, clocking 2:09:41, just a couple of steps ahead of Antoni Niemczak whose second place finish was recorded with the same finishing time.

Ptayo won the 1990 Chicago Marathon by trading the lead with Toni Niemczak to overcome the 14 miles per hour (23 km/h) winds. He overtook Niemczak with just five yards remaining in the race.

== Achievements ==
Year	Competition	Venue	Position	Event	Notes
Representing Mexico
1990	Chicago Marathon	Chicago, United States	1st	Marathon	2:09:41
1991	Pan American Games	Havana, Cuba	1st	10,000 m	29:45.49
1994	London Marathon	London, United Kingdom	6th	Marathon	2:10:58
1994	Ibero-American Championships	Mar del Plata, Argentina	2nd	5000m	13:50.31
1995	Los Angeles Marathon	Los Angeles, United States	3rd	Marathon	2:12.49

== Best times ==
- 5000 meters: 13:26.46 (1993)
- 10,000 meters: 27:38.49 (1992)
- Half marathon: 1:01:38 (1994)
- Marathon: 2:09:41 (1990)
