= Lisa Rainsberger =

American runner

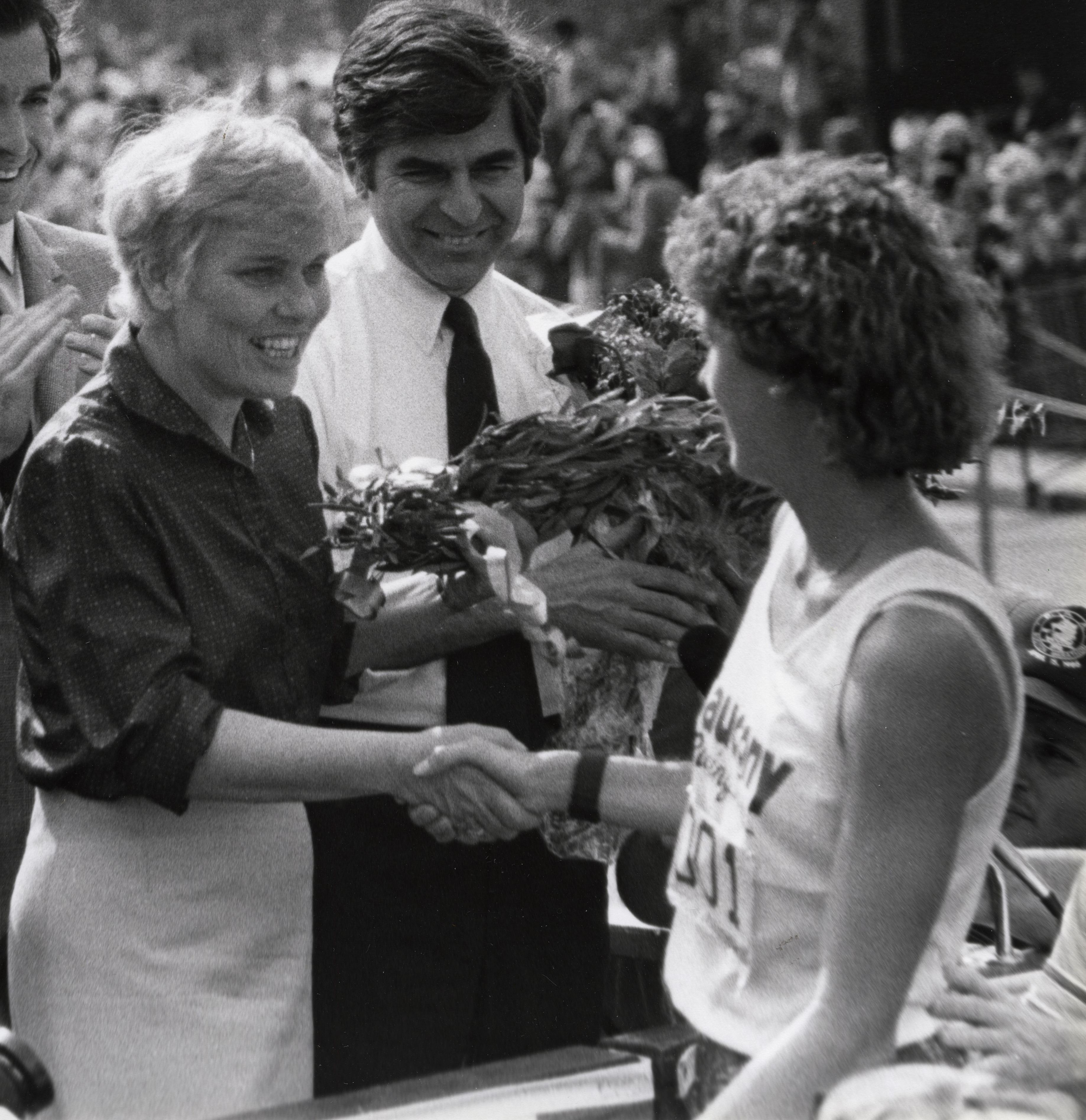
Rainsberger (right) being congratulated for her victory in the 1985 Boston Marathon by First Lady of Boston Kathy Flynn, while Massachusetts Governor Michael Dukakis looks on

Lisa Larsen Rainsberger, previously known as Lisa Larsen Weidenbach, (born May 7, 1961) is a distance runner, swimmer, and triathlete. She is the only American woman to win both the Boston Marathon and Chicago Marathon. Rainsberger was a three-time alternate for the U.S. women’s marathon team at the Olympics, and also qualified for the Olympic trials in the 10,000 m and in swimming. She is a member of the University of Michigan Track and Field and Road Runners of America Halls of Fame.

== Early life ==
While in high school in Battle Creek, Michigan, Rainsberger won competitions as a swimmer in the Individual Medley, qualifying for the 1980 Olympic Swimming trials, and later competed on scholarship as an All-American swimmer in college at the University of Michigan. Due to the 1980 Summer Olympics boycott, Rainsberger joined the track and cross country team and was a two-time All-American in track and cross country.

== Professional career ==
In 1984, she ran the inaugural women's Olympic marathon trials where she finished fourth, missing a spot in the Olympic games. In 1985, she won the Boston Marathon in a time of 2:34:06. An American did not win the Boston Marathon again until 2018. In 1988, Rainsberger finished fifth in the 10,000 m and fourth in the marathon at the Olympic Trials. Rainsberger won the Chicago Marathon back-to-back in 1988 (2:29:17) and 1989 (2:28:15). In 1989, Rainsberger also broke the national records in the 10-mile and 15k. In 1990, she was third in the London Marathon. In 1992, for the third time, she finished fourth in the marathon at the U.S. Olympic Trials. In 1996, she competed in her last marathon Olympic trials, finishing 19th.

Rainsberger transitioned to triathlon with the “sole goal” of qualifying for the 2000 Summer Olympics. She finished sixth at the USA Triathlon Pro National Championship in 1997.

Rainsberger retired in 1998 due to injury and pregnancy. She has since become a coach, and has coached for the U.S. Army World Class Athlete Program and the U.S. Paralympic Track and Field team.

== Achievements ==
Year	Competition	Venue	Position	Event	Notes
Representing the United States
1984	US Olympic Marathon Trial	Olympia, Washington, United States	4th	Marathon	2:33.10
1985	Boston Marathon	Boston, United States	1st	Marathon	2:34:06
1988	US Olympic Trials	Pittsburgh, United States	5th	10,000 m	32:15.88
1988	Pittsburgh Marathon (US Olympic Trials)	Pittsburgh, United States	4th	Marathon	2:31:06
1988	Chicago Marathon	Chicago, United States	1st	Marathon	2:29:17
1989	Chicago Marathon	Chicago, United States	1st	Marathon	2:28:15
1990	London Marathon	London, England	3rd	Marathon	2:28:16
1990	Hokkaido Marathon	Sapporo, Japan	1st	Marathon	2:31:29
1992	Houston Marathon (US Olympic Trial)	Houston, United States	4th	Marathon	2:33:32
1993	Twin Cities Marathon	Minneapolis, United States	1st	Marathon	2:33:38
1996	US Olympic Trials	Columbia, United States	19th	Marathon	2:38:44
1997	USA Triathlon Pro National Championships	St. Joseph, United States	6th	Triathlon	2:08:09

1989 American records in the 10-mile and 15k

== Personal ==
Rainsberger lives in Colorado Springs with her husband, Bud. She has four children. One of her daughters is runner Katie Rainsberger.

== See also ==
- List of winners of the Boston Marathon
- List of winners of the Chicago Marathon
