= Marian Sutton =

English long-distance runner

Personal information
- Born: 7 October 1963 (age 62) London
- Height: 1.83 m (6 ft 0 in)
- Weight: 67 kg (148 lb) (2000)

Sport
- Events: Marathon, Half marathon
- Club: Westbury Harriers

Marian Rosemarie Sutton (born 7 October 1963) is an English long-distance runner. She won the Chicago Marathon twice and competed for Britain at the 2000 Summer Olympics and several IAAF World Half Marathon Championships. She represented England at the 2002 Commonwealth Games, placing eighth in marathon.

Sutton came to prominence as a marathon runner when she finished fifth in the 1995 Chicago Marathon. Then determined to qualify for the 1996 Summer Olympics she with coach Bud Baldaro scheduled training to cope with the heat expected in Atlanta. However, she was not selected for the British team with Karen MacLeod and Suzanne Rigg taking the final two places alongside Liz McColgan. This snub spurred Sutton on to win the Chicago Marathon in 1996 and completed the double win a year later. Sutton was selected for the 2000 Summer Olympics as the only Briton.

== Competition record ==
Year	Competition	Venue	Position	Event	Notes
Representing United Kingdom
1992	IAAF World Half Marathon Championships	Newcastle-upon-Tyne, United Kingdom	37th	Half marathon	1:13:09
1993	IAAF World Half Marathon Championships	Brussels, Belgium	19th	Half marathon	1:12:37
1993	World Championships	Stuttgart, Germany	14th	Marathon	2:39:45
1994	European Championships	Helsinki, Finland	22nd	Marathon	2:40:34
1994	IAAF World Half Marathon Championships	Oslo, Norway	72nd	Half marathon	1:16:15
1995	Chicago Marathon	Chicago, United States	5th	Marathon	2:32:36
1996	Chicago Marathon	Chicago, United States	1st	Marathon	2:30:41
1997	Chicago Marathon	Chicago, United States	1st	Marathon	2:29:03
1997	Fleet Half Marathon	Fleet, England	1st	Half marathon	1:12:35
1999	IAAF World Half Marathon Championships	Palermo, Italy	22nd	Half marathon	1:12:36
1999	Chicago Marathon	Chicago, United States	7th	Marathon	2:28:42 (PB)
2000	Olympic Games	Sydney, Australia	26th	Marathon	2:34:33
2002	Commonwealth Games	Manchester, England	8th	Marathon	2:45:55
2002	Austin Marathon	Austin, Texas, United States	1st	Marathon	2:31:43
2002	Four Villages Half Marathon	Helsby, England	1st	Half marathon	1:13:08
