= Ritva Lemettinen =

Finnish marathon runner

Ritva Kaija Hannele Lemettinen
Personal information
- Full name: Ritva Kaija Hannele Lemettinen
- Nationality: Finnish
- Born: September 9, 1960 Ylistaro, Seinäjoki, Finland
- Height: 160 cm (5 ft 3 in)
- Weight: 50 kg (110 lb)

Sport
- Sport: Athletics
- Event: Marathon
- Club: Vaasan Vasama

Achievements and titles
- Olympic finals: 1992
- Personal bests: 2:28:00 (London Marathon, 1995)

Ritva Kaija Hannele Melender (née Lemettinen, born 9 September 1960 in Ylistaro) is a retired female marathon runner from Finland. She represented Finland at the 1992 Summer Olympics in Barcelona, Spain, finishing in 14th place in the women's marathon. She twice won the Chicago Marathon, in 1993 and 1995. Her personal best time is 2:28:00 set at the London Marathon in 1995. This also stood as the Finnish national record until 2023.

== Achievements ==
Year	Competition	Venue	Position	Event	Notes
Representing Finland
1990	European Championships	Split, SFR Yugoslavia	9th	Marathon	2:39.42
1991	Honolulu Marathon	Honolulu, Hawaii	1st	Marathon	2:40:11
1992	Olympic Games	Barcelona, Spain	14th	Marathon	2:41:48
1993	World Championships	Stuttgart, Germany	18th	Marathon	2:45:05
1993	Chicago Marathon	Chicago, United States	1st	Marathon	2:33:18
1994	European Championships	Helsinki, Finland	6th	Marathon	2:33.05
1995	Chicago Marathon	Chicago, United States	1st	Marathon	2:28:27
1995	World Championships	Gothenburg, Sweden	5th	Marathon	2:31:19
