= Danuta Bartoszek =

Canadian long-distance runner

Danuta Bartoszek (born 19 August 1961 in Pyrzyce, Poland) is a former long-distance runner.

Originally from Poland, Bartoszek represented Canada at the 1996 Summer Olympics in Atlanta, Georgia. At Atlanta, the resident of Mississauga, Ontario finished the women's marathon in 32nd place (2:37:06). In 2001, she competed in the women's marathon at the 2001 World Championships in Athletics held in Edmonton, Alberta, Canada. She finished in 43rd place.

== Achievements ==
Year	Competition	Venue	Position	Event	Notes
Representing Canada
1993	World Championships	Stuttgart, Germany	—	Marathon	DNF
1996	Olympic Games	Atlanta, United States	32nd	Marathon	2:37:06
1997	World Championships	Athens, Greece	49th	Marathon	3:01:30
2001	National Capital Marathon	Ottawa, Ontario, Canada	1st	Marathon	2:37:58.9
2001	World Championships	Edmonton, Alberta, Canada	43rd	Marathon	2:50:06
