= Eddy Hellebuyck =

American long-distance runner

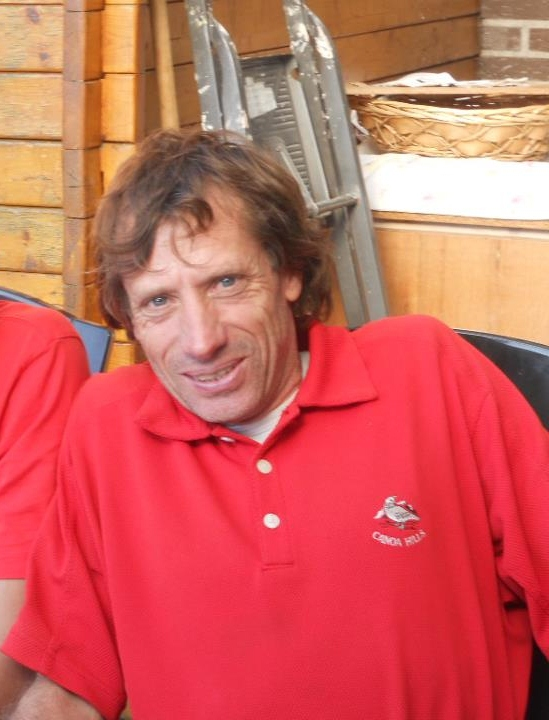
- Eddy Hellebuyck in 2012

Personal information
- Nationality: Belgian
- Born: 22 January 1961 (age 64)

Sport
- Sport: Long-distance running
- Event: Marathon

Eddy Hellebuyck (born 22 January 1961) is a Belgian-born American long-distance runner. He competed in the men's marathon at the 1996 Summer Olympics, representing Belgium and finishing in 67th place. By 2000, he had become a U.S. citizen and competed in the U.S. Olympic Trials that year, but did not make the team. His P.R. is 2:11.50 set in 1994 at the Antwerp Marathon. He also won the Cleveland Marathon in 1989, the Lake Biwa Marathon in Japan in 1990, and then the Columbus Marathon in 1994. His last win at this distance was in the Twin Cities Marathon in 2:12.47, a new US master's record, in 2003.

In 2004, he tested positive for recombinant human erythropoietin (rhEPO) and was suspended from competition for two years. Hellebuyck's U.S. master's record was accordingly rescinded and his victory in the Twin Cities was nullified through this performance enhancing drug disqualification.

== See also ==
- List of doping cases in athletics
