= Daniel Njenga =

Kenyan long-distance runner

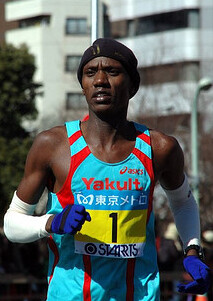
- Njenga in the 2008 Tokyo Marathon.

Personal information
- Full name: Daniel Njenga Muturi
- Nationality: Kenyan
- Born: 7 May 1976 (age 50)
- Years active: 1995–present
Medal record
Representing Kenya
Men's athletics
Universiade
Gold medal – first place	1995 Universiade	3000 m s'chase

Daniel Njenga Muturi (born 7 May 1976) is a Kenyan long-distance runner, who specializes in the marathon.

He had his first successes in 1995 as he won the steeplechase gold medal at the 1995 Summer Universiade and also the Chiba International Cross Country meeting. He was based in Japan from early on in his early career and won the steeplechase at the Japanese Championships on three occasions.

Njenga turned to marathon running and made his debut in 1995 at the Saitama Marathon in Ageo, Saitama, Japan, placing first, and then coming in tenth in his second marathon at the 1999 Fukuoka Marathon. His breakthrough year came in 2002 when he was the runner-up at the Beppu-Oita Marathon and Chicago Marathon. His time of 2:06:16 hours in Chicago made him the third fastest runner in the world for 2002, behind only Khalid Khannouchi and Paul Tergat. He is known for his consistent, close finishes in the Chicago Marathon, finishing as runner-up three times and third on two occasions, between 2003 and 2007. He was the 2006 winner of the Sendai Half Marathon. He won the Tokyo International Marathon in 2004 and then the reformed Tokyo Marathon in 2007. Njenga is a featured subject in the 2007 marathon documentary Spirit of the Marathon.

Njenga was victorious at the 2009 Hokkaido Marathon and took consecutive runner-up spots at the Beppu-Ōita Marathon in 2010 and 2011.

== Achievements ==
Year	Competition	Venue	Position	Event	Notes
Representing Kenya
1995	Universiade	Fukuoka, Japan	1st	3000 m s'chase	8:27.03
1999	Fukuoka Marathon	Fukuoka, Japan	10th	Marathon	2:11:49
2002	Beppu-Ōita Marathon	Beppu and Ōita, Japan	2nd	Marathon	2:12:43
2002	Chicago Marathon	Chicago, United States	2nd	Marathon	2:06:16
2003	Chicago Marathon	Chicago, United States	3rd	Marathon	2:07:41
2004	Tokyo International Marathon	Tokyo, Japan	1st	Marathon	2:08:43
2004	Chicago Marathon	Chicago, United States	2nd	Marathon	2:07:44
2005	Chicago Marathon	Chicago, United States	3rd	Marathon	2:07:14
2006	Chicago Marathon	Chicago, United States	2nd	Marathon	2:07:40
2007	Tokyo Marathon	Tokyo, Japan	1st	Marathon	2:09:45
2007	Chicago Marathon	Chicago, United States	3rd	Marathon	2:12:45
2009	Hokkaido Marathon	Sapporo, Japan	1st	Marathon	2:12:03
2010	Beppu-Ōita Marathon	Beppu and Ōita, Japan	2nd	Marathon	2:10:55
2011	Beppu-Ōita Marathon	Beppu and Ōita, Japan	1st	Marathon	2:10:24
2014	Beppu-Ōita Marathon	Beppu and Ōita, Japan	10th	Marathon	2:13:50

== Notes ==
- Daniel Njenga should not be confused with a similarly named Kenyan athlete, Daniel Mburu Njenga, who was the winner of the 2008 Toronto Marathon and 2009 Mississauga Half Marathon.
