= Evans Rutto =

Kenyan long-distance runner

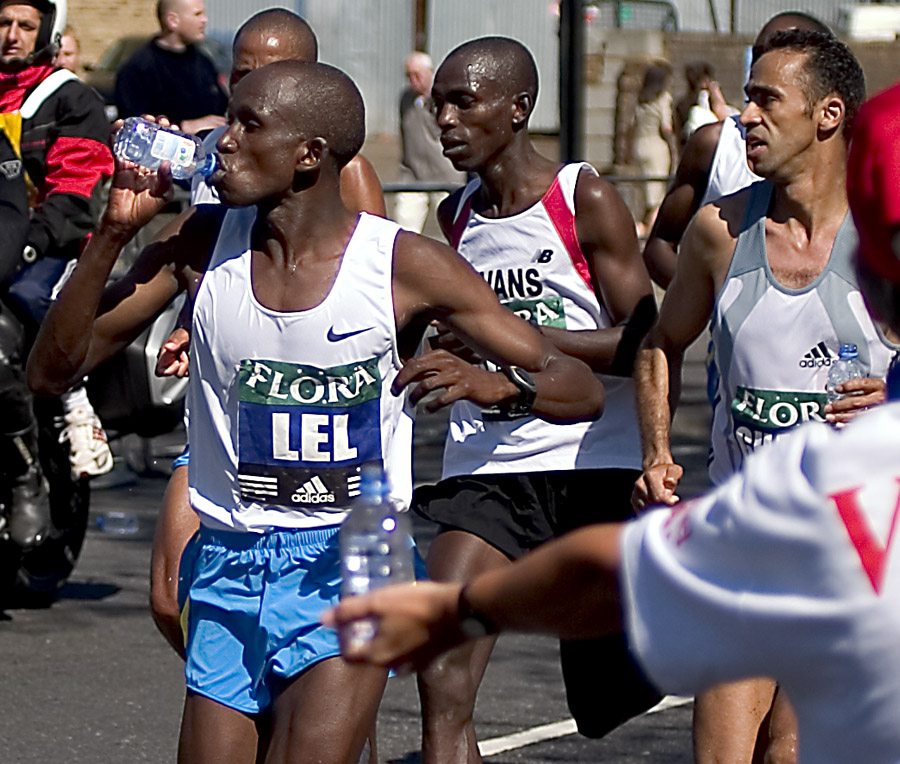
Rutto (center) between Martin Lel (left) and Jaouad Gharib (right)

Evans Rutto (born 8 April 1978 in Marakwet District) is a Kenyan long-distance runner, who specialises in road running events. He made the fastest-ever marathon debut by winning the 2003 Chicago Marathon in a time of 2:05:50. He won the London Marathon and a second title in Chicago the following year.

After 2004, Rutto's form dipped considerably and in 2006 he took time away from marathoning due to injury. He has not yet returned to competition, although his personal best still keeps him within the top-20 fastest runners of all time.

== Career ==
His first major competition was the 1999 IAAF World Cross Country Championships and he finished in fifth place in the long race and helped secure a dominant Kenyan finish in the team competition. Rutto became an elite runner at the 10k to half marathon distances: he won the 2001 Beach to Beacon race and was the top Kenyan finisher at the 2001 IAAF World Half Marathon Championships with a run of 1:00:43 for sixth place.

He moved up to the marathon in 2003 and won the Chicago Marathon with a record debut time of 2:05:50, making him the fourth-fastest marathoner ever at the time (after Paul Tergat, Sammy Korir and Khalid Khannouchi). This was the fastest-ever time for a marathon debut and remains so – it also remains his personal best time.

He opened his 2004 season with a win at the London Marathon, beating Sammy Korir to the finish by half a minute. He returned to the Chicago course in October and defended his title with a winning time of 2:06:16 – over a minute and a half ahead of runner-up Daniel Njenga. These two times placed Rutto at the top two spots on the season's fastest marathons list for 2004.

His 2005 performances were considerably less successful as he only managed tenth place at the London Marathon, losing his unbeaten record of three straight victories. His fastest time of the year, 2:07:28, was only enough to bring him fourth at the Chicago Marathon. At the 2006 London Marathon he was in tenth place again and appeared in agony at the end of the race.

Rutto took time out from competitive running after a disappointing 2006, due to injury and personal problems.

He trains with Kimbia Athletics and is coached by Dieter Hogen. Rutto is married with three children, Winnie, Dennis, and Dieter (after Coach Dieter Hogen) (as of 2005). His father Kilimo Yano was also a runner, whose personal best at 10,000 metres was 29 minutes. He won the 2014 Mumbai Marathon losing out on the course record by one second and a US$15,000 bonus for it.

== Personal bests ==
Surface	Event	Time (h:m:s)	Venue	Date
Track	5000 m	13:02.71	Nürnberg, Germany	25 June 2000
Track	10,000 m	27:21.32	Villeneuve d'Ascq, France	17 June 2000
Road	10 km	28:07	Vancouver, Canada	22 April 2001
Road	Half marathon	1:00:43	Bristol, United Kingdom	7 October 2001
Road	Marathon	2:05:50	Chicago, United States	12 October 2003

- All information taken from IAAF profile.

== Competition record ==
Year	Competition	Venue	Position	Event	Notes
1999	World Cross Country Championships	Belfast, Northern Ireland	5th	Long race	39:12
1999	World Cross Country Championships	Belfast, Northern Ireland	1st	Team race	
2001	World Half Marathon Championships	Bristol, United Kingdom	6th	Half marathon	1:00:43
2001	World Half Marathon Championships	Bristol, United Kingdom	2nd	Team race	
2003	Chicago Marathon	Chicago, United States	1st	Marathon	2:05:50 (fastest debut)
2004	London Marathon	London, United Kingdom	1st	Marathon	2:06:18
2004	Chicago Marathon	Chicago, United States	1st	Marathon	2:06:16 (Year's fastest)
2005	London Marathon	London, United Kingdom	10th	Marathon	2:12:49
2005	Chicago Marathon	Chicago, United States	4th	Marathon	2:07:28
2006	London Marathon	London, United Kingdom	10th	Marathon	2:09:35
