= Kristy Johnston =

American marathon runner (born 1965)

Personal information
- Nationality: American
- Born: June 3, 1965 (age 61) Coos Bay, Oregon
- Height: 5 ft 5 in (165 cm)
- Weight: 110 lb (50 kg)
Medal record
World Marathon Majors
Gold medal – first place	1994 Chicago	Marathon

Kristy Johnston (born 3 June 1965) is a retired American marathoner. Johnson started her athletic career in 1986 and won her only World Marathon Majors at the 1994 Chicago Marathon. She reappeared at Chicago from 1995 to 2000 and was the Chicago women's runner-up in 1996. Outside of Chicago, Johnston ran at the United States Olympic Trials from 1992 to 2000. After retiring from athletics in 2000, Johnston became a middle school language arts teacher in Martinsburg, West Virginia.

== Early life and education ==
Johnston was born on 3 June 1965 in Coos Bay, Oregon. After attending Marshfield High School, she graduated from an English program at Portland College in 1988.

== Career ==
Johnston began running in 1986 at a 5K run in Portland, Oregon. During her career, Johnston ran in various lengths of marathons ranging from 3 kilometre runs to full marathons. Her first win in a full marathon came at the 1993 Houston Marathon with a time of 2:29:05. The following year, Johnston won her only World Marathon Majors at the 1994 Chicago Marathon with a time of 2:31:34. Before competing at the 1995 Chicago Marathon, Johnston told the Daily Herald Suburban Chicago that she had "almost quit running altogether before last year's Chicago marathon" due to a long term back injury. Johnston continued to reappear at the Chicago Marathon from 1995 to 2000 and had multiple top 8 finishes, which included second place in 1996. Outside of Chicago, Johnston competed at the United States Olympic Trials consecutively from 1992 to 2000. After reaching the semi-finals in 1992, Johnston was fifth in the 1996 Olympic Trials and second place at the 2000 Olympic Trials. After ending her athletic career in 2000, Johnston began teaching language arts to students at a middle school in Martinsburg, West Virginia.

== Achievements ==
Year	Competition	Venue	Position	Event	Notes
Representing United States
1991	Houston Marathon	Houston, United States	8th	Marathon	2:39:45
1993	Houston Marathon	Houston, United States	1st	Marathon	2:29:05
1994	Chicago Marathon	Chicago, United States	1st	Marathon	2:31:34
1995	Chicago Marathon	Chicago, United States	8th	Marathon	2:35:50
1996	Chicago Marathon	Chicago, United States	2nd	Marathon	2:31:06
1997	Boston Marathon	Boston, United States	DNF	Marathon	
1997	Chicago Marathon	Chicago, United States	13th	Marathon	2:42:24
1998	Chicago Marathon	Chicago, United States	8th	Marathon	2:32:37
1999	Chicago Marathon	Chicago, United States	10th	Marathon	2:32:34
2000	Chicago Marathon	Chicago, United States	8th	Marathon	2:33:20

== Awards and honors ==
Johnston was inducted into the Marshfield High School Athletic Hall of Fame in 2008.

== Personal life ==
Johnston married her coach Chris Fox in 1998.
