= Chicago Marathon =

Annual footrace held in Chicago, Illinois, US

- Logo for the Chicago Marathon
- Date: Second Sunday in October (before Columbus Day)
- Location: Chicago, Illinois, United States
- Event type: Road
- Distance: 26.219 miles (42.195 km)
- Established: 1977 (49 years ago)
- Last held: 2026
- Course records: Men: 2:00:35 WR to that date (2023 – Kelvin Kiptum); Women: 2:09:56 WR (2024 – Ruth Chepngetich)
- Website: chicagomarathon.com
- 2026 Chicago Marathon

The Chicago Marathon is a road marathon held in October in Chicago, Illinois, United States. It is one of the eight World Marathon Majors. Thus, it is also a World Athletics Label Road Race. The Chicago Marathon is one of the largest races by number of finishers worldwide. The race was awarded the World Athletics Heritage Plaque in 2024, for "outstanding contribution to the history and development of road running."

Annual Chicago marathons were held from 1905 to the 1920s, but the first race in the present series occurred on September 25, 1977, under the original name the Mayor Daley Marathon, and drew a field of 4,200 runners. The race has been held every year since, except in 1987 when only a half-marathon was run, and in 2020 as a result of the COVID-19 pandemic. It became among the fastest-growing modern-marathon road races in the world, due in part to its largely fast and flat course which facilitates the pursuit of personal records and world record performances. It generally begins and ends in Grant Park, and travels streets of the North Side, West Side and South Side, before returning to the Loop. The race has achieved its elite status among marathons by developing relationships with sponsors who provide prize money to lure elite runners who have produced American and world record performances. Since 2008, the race has been sponsored and organized by Bank of America, and is officially known as the Bank of America Chicago Marathon.

The race admits around 50,000 runners and only runners who finish within 6 1/2 hours are officially timed. Those wishing to participate can register after either meeting a time qualifying standard or being selected through a general lottery. Although the race has limited registration, exceptions include elite runners, legacy finishers, and charity representatives. In the 21st century, increasingly, local, national and global charities as well as humanitarian organizations encourage sponsored participation in the event as a means of fund raising.

== History ==
The first modern marathon at the 1896 Games of the I Olympiad in Greece generated interest in the sport which led to similar races throughout most western countries and across the United States. While marathons sporadically occurred in New York City and St. Louis, the Boston Marathon had established an annual marathon in 1897, soon to be followed by a Chicago annual race. Beginning in 1905, the Chicago Marathon (organized first by the Illinois Athletic Club 1905 to 1909, then sponsored by the Chicago Daily News after 1910) was held annually, with significant community and spectator support, until the early 1920s.

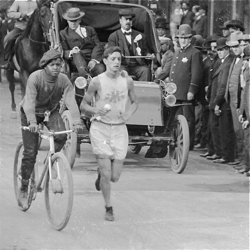
First Chicago Marathon September 23, 1905. Louis Marks in the lead.

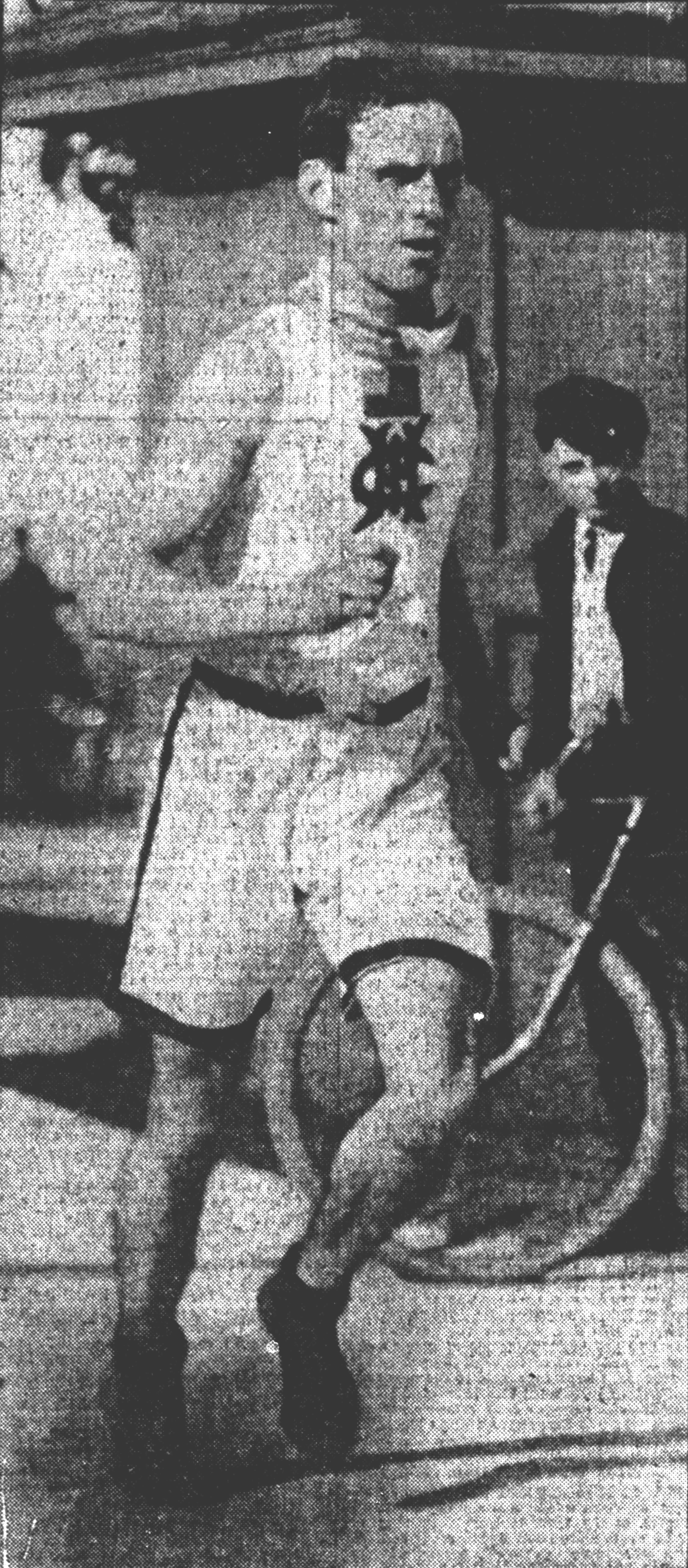
Dennis Bennett at the 1906 Chicago Marathon

The first Chicago Marathon was run on September 23, 1905. That first race began at the Evanston Golf Club and finished in front of a standing-room-only paying crowd at Washington Park Race Track. Beginning with a little over a dozen runners, only seven completed the course. In a stunning upset, a reported 100,000 or more spectators watched Chicagoan Rhud Metzner come from behind to steal a late-race victory from the favored Louis Marks. With that first race, the Chicago Marathon began an annual run of epic races that continued until the early 1920s, eventually on a revised course that largely resembles today's marathon route. The second year, feet bleeding, Canadian Dennis Bennett won, while a band played "Maple Leaf Forever". In the early years, runners had their own regimens: John Lindquist from Brooklyn took a commanding lead in 1907 while doing whiskey shots, but by mile 23, he was apparently falling asleep; while, the next year, the French-born Chicagoan Albert Corey had more success sipping champagne. Over the years elite fields included Olympic champions, world records were continually sought, and the marathon continued to inspire Chicago communities and spectators until challenges of the early 1920s sidelined the event.

It was not until the health consciousness of the 1960s that marathon growth gained traction in the public's eyes. Then the 1976 New York City Marathon, which was the first New York City Marathon to embrace the five borough course, popularized the big city marathon. Also that year, a group of runners in Chicago held a meeting at the YMCA on LaSalle Street to discuss interest and begin planning a local marathon. As the New York marathon began to grow exponentially in the 1970s, the Chicago Marathon was established as a rival to the New York City Marathon. By the mid-1980s, the Chicago Marathon was ensconced as one of the big four marathons. During the mid-1980s, it was named America's Marathon/Chicago and opened up the way for appearance payments. Runner and Olympic Gold Medalist Joan Benoit Samuelson described the Chicago Marathons of the mid-1980s as "The World's Marathon". The Bank of America Chicago Marathon is an open race with no qualifying time to participate.

The founding location of the Chicago Marathon is at 214 West Erie in River North.

The modern era Chicago Marathon was founded over the objection of Ed Kelly, Chicago Park District Superintendent who refused permission to run in the parks or along the Lake Michigan lakefront. With the help of Lee Flaherty, the event's founder who operated out of Flair House in the Near North Side community area of Chicago, Chicago Mayor Richard J. Daley's support for the marathon was enlisted. Although Mayor Daley died, his successor Michael Anthony Bilandic approved the race and got Kelly on board. Michael Bilandic, a runner, and his wife actually passed out medals at the first marathon on September 25, 1977. This first edition of the modern Chicago Marathon was called the Mayor Daley Marathon. Flaherty footed the bill for the first race, which had no sponsors. He again footed the bill in 1978 when the race was again called the Mayor Daley Marathon. In 1979, however, Beatrice Foods became the first race sponsor.

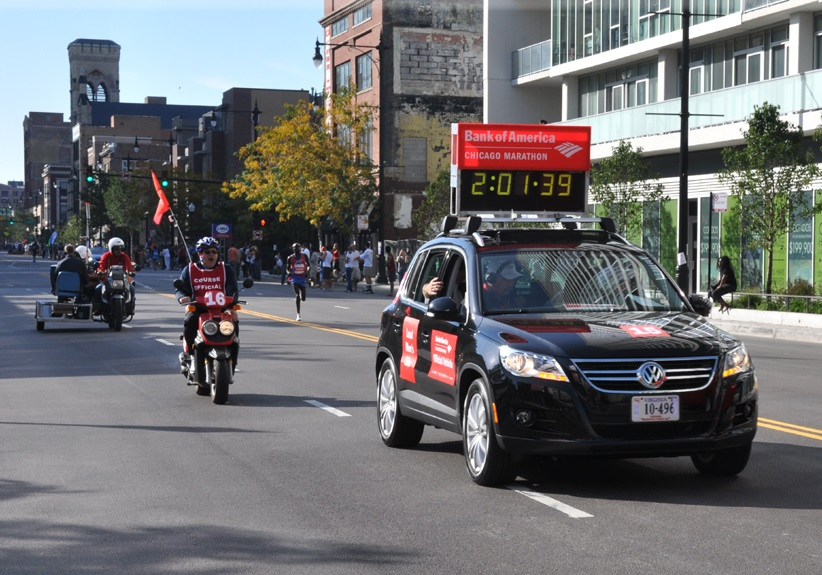
Evans Cheruiyot follows the course car (with clock) during his 2008 victory. The lead course car carries the current race time.

In the early years the Chicago Marathon was held in August. It has from its inception with 4,200 runners and 2,128 finishers been one of the nation's largest marathons. The 2000 running was second only to New York. The 1979 and 1980 events, however, continued to be gatherings of amateur runners. By 1982, the race finally had sufficient prize money to attract world class athletes. The 1982 was the first with world class times such as the 2:10:59 by Greg Meyer. By 1983, the Chicago Marathon had achieved its status as one of America's most important marathons. In 1984, Beatrice raised the purse to $250,000 ($50,000 more than New York's). The race had become a legitimate rival to New York and continues to vie for top runners. In the 1985 race, Steve Jones broke his own course record (2 seconds short of the world record). At that time, it was considered the premier marathon in the United States. Although 1986 had 40 world-class runners among the 8,000 participants the times paled in comparison. Beatrice dropped out as a sponsor in 1987. Because of this only a half-marathon race was held that year and the marathon was moved to the spring of 1988 and attracted Heileman Brewing Company to sponsor the 1988 Old Style Chicago Marathon. The race resulted in three women who had been passed over for the 1988 Games of the XXIV Olympiad placing in the top positions. In 1991, Heileman discontinued its sponsorship and both the prize money and performances waned. In 1992, the race again had no sponsorship, but 1993 brought new sponsor LaSalle Bank. In 1994, the race became the LaSalle Bank Chicago Marathon. In 1996, LaSalle Bank purchased the Chicago Marathon from Major Events, Inc., who had purchased the race three years prior from Flaherty. In 1998, the race began using transponder timing. In 2001, when Catherine Ndereba broke the women's world record marathon time, both the men's and women's then-current world records had been set at the Chicago Marathon.

2007 Chicago Marathon temperatures

In 2007, Bank of America acquired LaSalle Bank's parent company ABN AMRO North America in 2007 and assumed the race's title sponsorship. The 2007 race made history with the first ever CEO Marathon Challenge. The race featured a special competition among the CEOs, presidents, company owners and c-suite executives of companies with at least $5 million in annual gross revenue ($2.5 million for women). The 2007 race also made history for having three (men's, women's & men's wheelchair) of its four races decided in the final 100 meters in a day of record setting heat. The race was partially shut down early (after three and a half hours) as temperatures rose to an unseasonably hot 88 °F (31 °C), which surpassed both the temperature records for the Chicago Marathon and official Chicago records for October 7. Over 10,000 registrants chose not to run in the record temperatures, while 10,934 people did not finish (many were called after the course closed early for safety). One runner died, over 30 were hospitalized, and over 400 others sought medical attention. Marathon owner and sponsor Bank of America, which had just acquired LaSalle Bank, has denied culpability. Similar hot conditions have been experienced in other city center races. In 2003, London's The British 10K also had extremely hot weather that affected many runners.

The 2020 edition of the race was cancelled due to the coronavirus pandemic, with all registrants given the option of either transferring their entry to 2021, 2022, or 2023, or obtaining a full refund.

In 2024, Sebastian Coe, president of World Athletics, presented the Chicago Marathon with the World Athletics Heritage Plaque

== Course ==
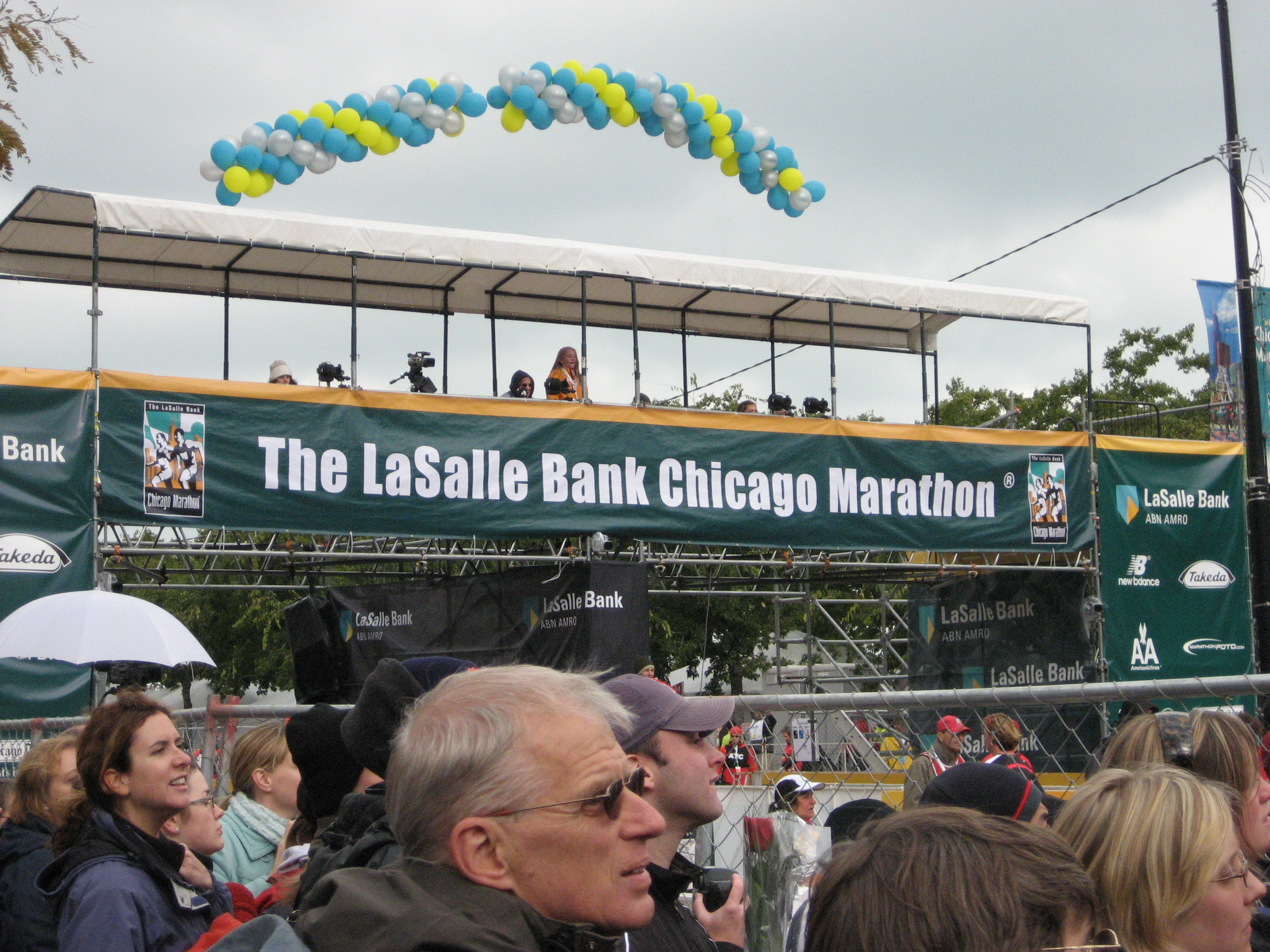
Chicago Marathon start/finish in Grant Park, October 2006

The marathon course is a loop course, starting and ending at Grant Park. From there, the current course winds through 29 of the city's neighborhoods. The course loop can be generally divided into three sections: North, West, and South. In each of these sections, three of the city's main stadiums are near the course's turning points: Wrigley Field to the north; the United Center to the west; and Rate Field to the south. The city's fourth professional stadium, Soldier Field, is located near the start/finish area.

For the first three miles, runners wind through Chicago's downtown area. Eventually, they head north along LaSalle Street.

Runners are supported by over 12,000 volunteers spread throughout the course including at 20 aid stations located approximate every 1–3 miles, plus the finish. For runners in distress, aid station volunteers include medical staff and ambulatory services are scattered throughout the course.

Digital timers are positioned every 5 kilometers, besides the halfway point & finish.

== Runner statistics ==
Chicago Marathon Finishers (2000–present) Total finishers and by gender
Year	Finishers			Avg Finish Time
Year	Total	Male	Female	Avg Finish Time
2000	27,870	16,802	11,068	4:21:46
2001	28,390	17,129	11,261	4:19:28
2002	31,093	18,111	12,982	4:19:51
2003	32,395	18,720	13,675	4:25:09
2004	33,033	19,073	13,960	4:26:53
2005	32,995	18,673	14,322	4:26:22
2006	33,618	18,904	14,714	4:25:02
2007	28,815	16,945	11,870	4:52:11
2008	31,343	17,675	13,668	4:46:30
2009	33,475	18,983	14,492	4:27:20
2010	36,159	19,973	16,186	4:43:48
2011	35,670	20,256	15,414	4:40:34
2012	37,455	20,688	16,767	4:32:02
2013	39,122	21,618	17,504	4:32:23
2014	40,801	22,299	18,502	4:33:03
2015	37,182	20,144	17,038	4:33:14
2016	40,608	22,045	18,563	4:34:48
2017	44,508	22,906	21,602	4:47:23
2018	44,584	23,934	20,650	4:34:01
2019	45,956	24,626	21,330	4:29:51
2020	cancelled due to COVID-19 pandemic			
2021	26,112	14,228	11,884	4:42:32
2022	39,420	20,931	18,489	4:29:09
2023	48,574	25,858	22,626	4:21:03
2024	52,062	28,039	23,888	4:19:55
Source:|||"Chicago Marathon Race Results 2023". www.marathonguide.com.

The Bank of America Chicago Marathon has grown significantly from its beginnings. In 1905, 20 runners registered for the first Chicago Marathon, 15 actually started the race, and 7 finished. For the first "modern" marathon race in 1977, 4,200 people took part. In 1995, 9,000 people registered, and in 1999, over 29,000 people registered. The 2001 marathon run on October 7 reached its cap of 37,500, which was instituted after the 2000 race drew 33,171 runners, just prior to the entry deadline on September 19. In 2003, 2004, 2005, and 2006 it reached its cap of 40,000. The October 10, 2004, October 9, 2005, and October 22, 2006, races reached their 40,000 entrant caps on August 16, July 14, and May 26 respectively. On April 18, 2007, the 2007 race run on October 7 reached its cap of 45,000 entrants. There was a late registration exemption whereby elite runners (marathon times of less than 2:31/3:01 or half marathon times of 1:11/1:21 for (men/women)) could register until September 1 even though the race had reached its registration cap in the spring. The 40,000 registrants and 33,000 finishers in 2003 made the Chicago Marathon the third or fourth largest marathon depending on which metric (registrants or finishers) is used.

The Chicago Marathon has never excluded women. Historically, however, the women's field has been smaller than the men's. This seems to be the result of older age categories having large multiples of men to women, but the women are beginning to outnumber the men in the 20s age group of the field.

=== Records ===
World records have been broken at Chicago seven times. In 1984, Steve Jones broke the world record with 2:08:05. In 1999, Khalid Khannouchi was the first to surpass 2:06:00 with 2:05:42.

The men's course record was broken in the 2013 race by Dennis Kimetto with a time of 2:03:45. On October 8, 2023, the late Kelvin Kiptum set a new world record, and therefore also the Chicago course record, completing the course in 2:00:35.

The women's record was broken in two consecutive years. In 2001, Catherine Ndereba broke the record in 2:18:47, and Paula Radcliffe surpassed that mark with 2:17:18 the year after. In 2019, Brigid Kosgei won in a world record time of 2:14:04, which was surpassed in 2023 by Sifan Hassan setting a new course record of 2:13:44. The next year, in 2024, Ruth Chepng'etich broke the women's world record again with a time of 2:09:56.

At the 2025 Chicago Marathon, Conner Mantz finished fourth in the race with a time of 2:04:43. With this time he broke the American Marathon Record which previously was 2:05:38.

== Economic impact ==
Much of the marathon's impact is derived from the tourism industry. More than 10,000 of the runners in 2010 indicated that it was their first visit to Chicago. Of that, 6,000 came from 100 countries. Due to the travelers, the event increases hotel occupancy rates during the marathon. According to an independent study by the University of Illinois, the 2015 marathon contributed an estimated US$277 million worth of activity to the Chicago economy, equivalent to 1,948 jobs.

=== Charity program ===
Since the charity program was officially established in 2002, more than 106,000 runners have raised over $207 million for local, national and global causes.

Charity fundraising is now closely intertwined with the event as the runners now raise money for research, aid the suffering and heighten public awareness of different causes. The marathon offers all registered entrants the opportunity to fundraise for a charity partner. The marathon recognizes four levels of charities based on the number of participants recruited, and fundraising levels.

Runners can also opt out of the public lottery or obtain a guaranteed place after this has been drawn by choosing to run for an official charity. The 2016 event had over 170 charity partners, and raised more than US$16.9 million.

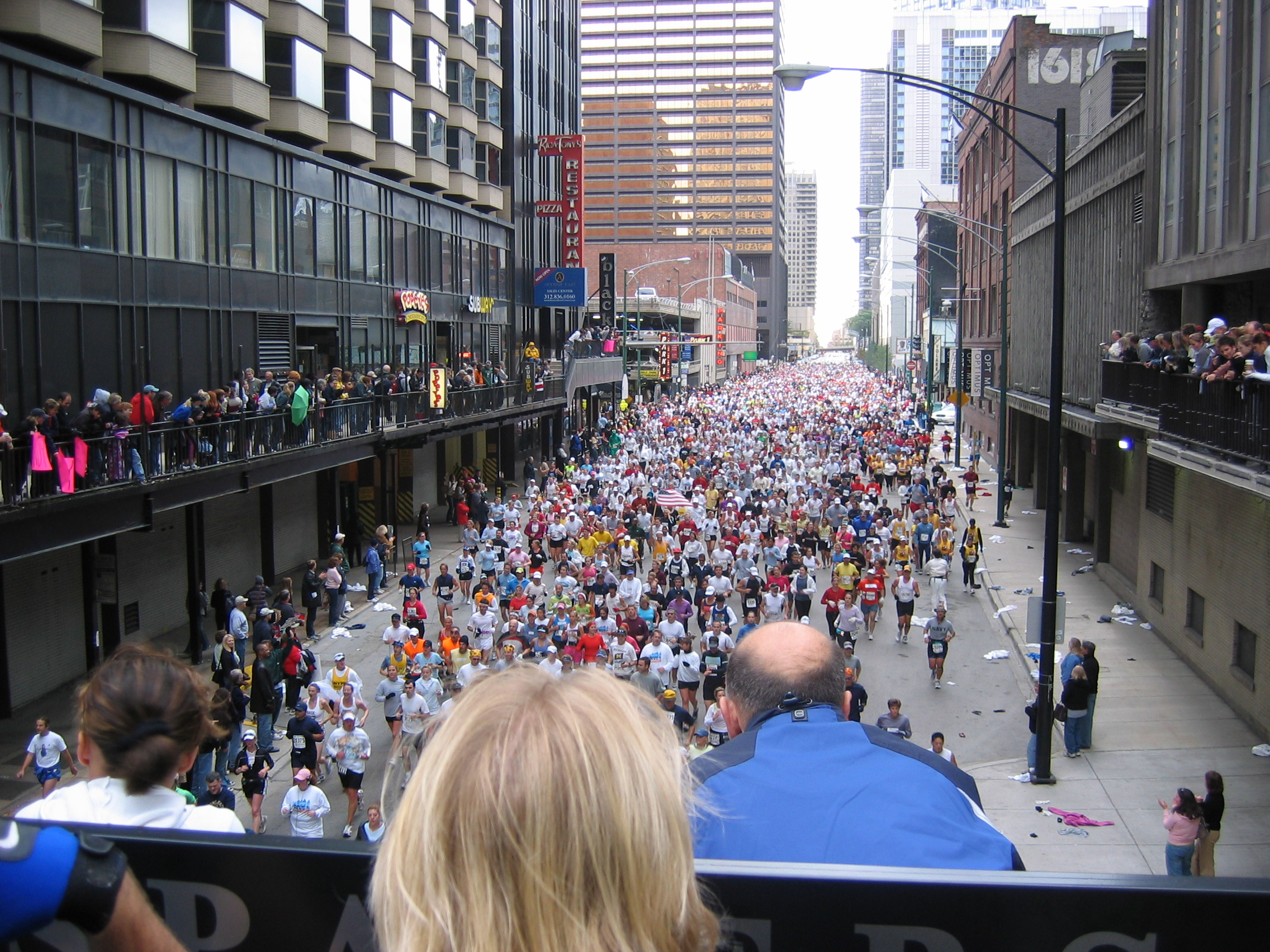
The 2005 LaSalle Bank ABN Amro Chicago Marathon at Grand Avenue passing under Michigan Avenue (Chicago) along the Magnificent Mile.

Year	Charity count	Charity runner count	Funds raised
2001	7	—N/a	—N/a
2002	14	1,674	$2,950,000
2003	19	2,527	$4,540,000
2004	29	2,449	$4,740,000
2005	43	3,000	$6,317,000
2006	60	4,500	$9,500,000
2007	85	6,600	$9,985,482
2008	110	6,745	$9,209,000
2009	123	8,768	$10,183,855
2010	150	9,842	$12,109,000
2011	162	10,192	$13,400,000
2012	170	10,693	$15,300,000
2013	140	10,712	$15,000,000
2014	195	9,107	$17,300,000
2015	172	9,549	$18,700,000
2016	170+	9,313	$16,900,000
2017	180	10,525	$18,500,000
2018	170	11,625	$22,700,000
2019	172	12,000+	$27,100,000
Source: 2015 Chicago Marathon Media Guide

== Deaths ==
- 1998 – Kelly Barrett, 43, Littleton, Colorado – Believed to be caused by hyponatremia
- 2000 – Danny Towns, 45, Edmond, Oklahoma – Cardiac arrest
- 2001 – Luke Roach, 22, Seattle, Washington – Collapsed near finish line. Body temperature reached 107 °F (42 °C) (heat stroke)
- 2003 – Rachael Townsend, 29, The Plains, Ohio – Mitral valve prolapse
- 2007 – Chad Schieber, 35, Midland, Michigan – Mitral valve prolapse
- 2011 – William Caviness, 35, Greensboro, North Carolina – Believed to have died from cardiac arrest five hundred yards from finish line.

== See also ==
- Spirit of the Marathon, 2007 documentary
