= List of winners of the New York City Marathon =

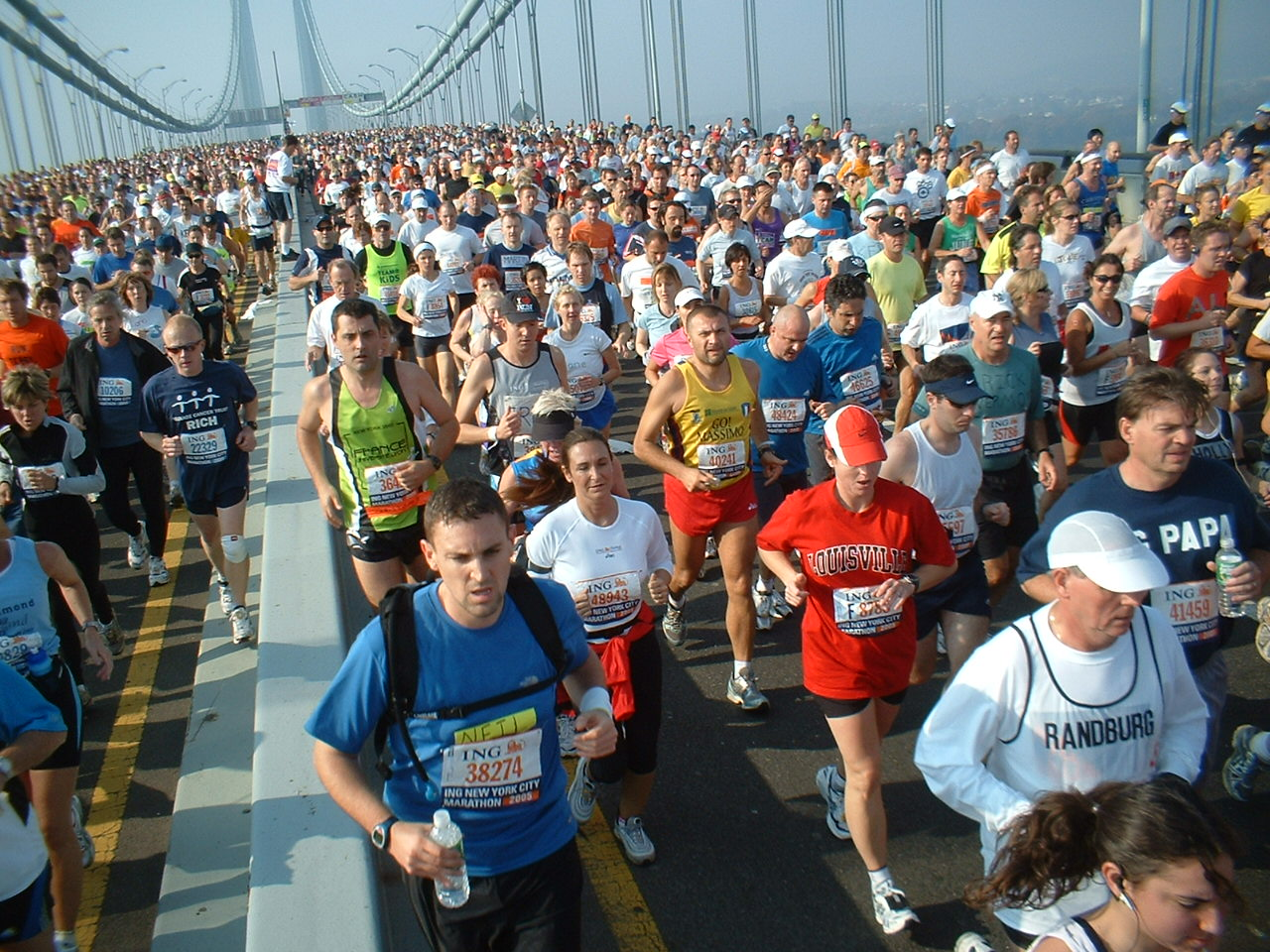
The New York City Marathon is the largest marathon in the world.

The New York City Marathon, one of the six World Marathon Majors, is a 26.2-mile (42.2 km) race that has been held in New York City since 1970. It is the largest marathon in the world; since 2010, every race except one has had over 45,000 finishers, peaking at over 53,000 in 2019. From 1970 through 1975, the race was held entirely in Central Park, but since 1976, the course has started in Staten Island and goes through each of the city's five boroughs. The race was canceled in 2012 due to Hurricane Sandy, which hit New York less than a week before the race had been scheduled to take place. The open division of the race transitioned to a virtual event in 2020 due to the COVID-19 pandemic in the city, while the wheelchair division was cancelled.

Including the 2020 event, 40 men and 34 women have won the open division of the New York City Marathon, while nine men and ten women have won the wheelchair division. The winners have represented 23 countries. Americans have won the marathon the most, doing so on 35 occasions; Kenyans have won 32 times; and Swiss 16 times.

Gary Muhrcke won the first race with a time of 2:31:38. There were 127 entrants, of whom 55 finished – the only female starter, Nina Kuscsik, withdrew partway due to illness. The following year, Beth Bonner became the first female finisher, winning the race in 2:55:22, a time that is officially credited as the first sub-3-hour marathon by a woman. Grete Waitz, a Norwegian female runner, achieved three official world records at the race between 1978 and 1980. Allison Roe and Alberto Salazar set world record times in the women's and men's races in 1981, but a later investigation found that the course was short. Their times do not stand as official world records, though the New York City Marathon maintains them as course records. Waitz dominated the women's marathon between 1978 and 1988, winning nine of the eleven races during that period: her nine wins are the most of any runner at the New York City Marathon. In the men's race, Bill Rodgers has won the most times, doing so in four consecutive years, from 1976 to 1979. The current open division course records are held by Tamirat Tola, who set a time of 2:04:58 in the 2023 men's race, and Margaret Okayo, who set the women's record at 2:22:31 in 2003.

A wheelchair race has been held since 2000, when 72 people finished: Kamel Ayari won the men's race, and Anh Nguyen Thi Xuan won the women's. Among wheelchair racers, Marcel Hug of Switzerland has the most victories, with eight. Three competitors have five victories each: Kurt Fearnley of Australia, Edith Hunkeler of Switzerland, and Tatyana McFadden of the United States. Hug holds the men's course record with a time of 1:25:26 set in 2022, while Catherine Debrunner of Switzerland holds the women's record with 1:39:32 set in 2023.

== Winners ==
=== Men's open division ===
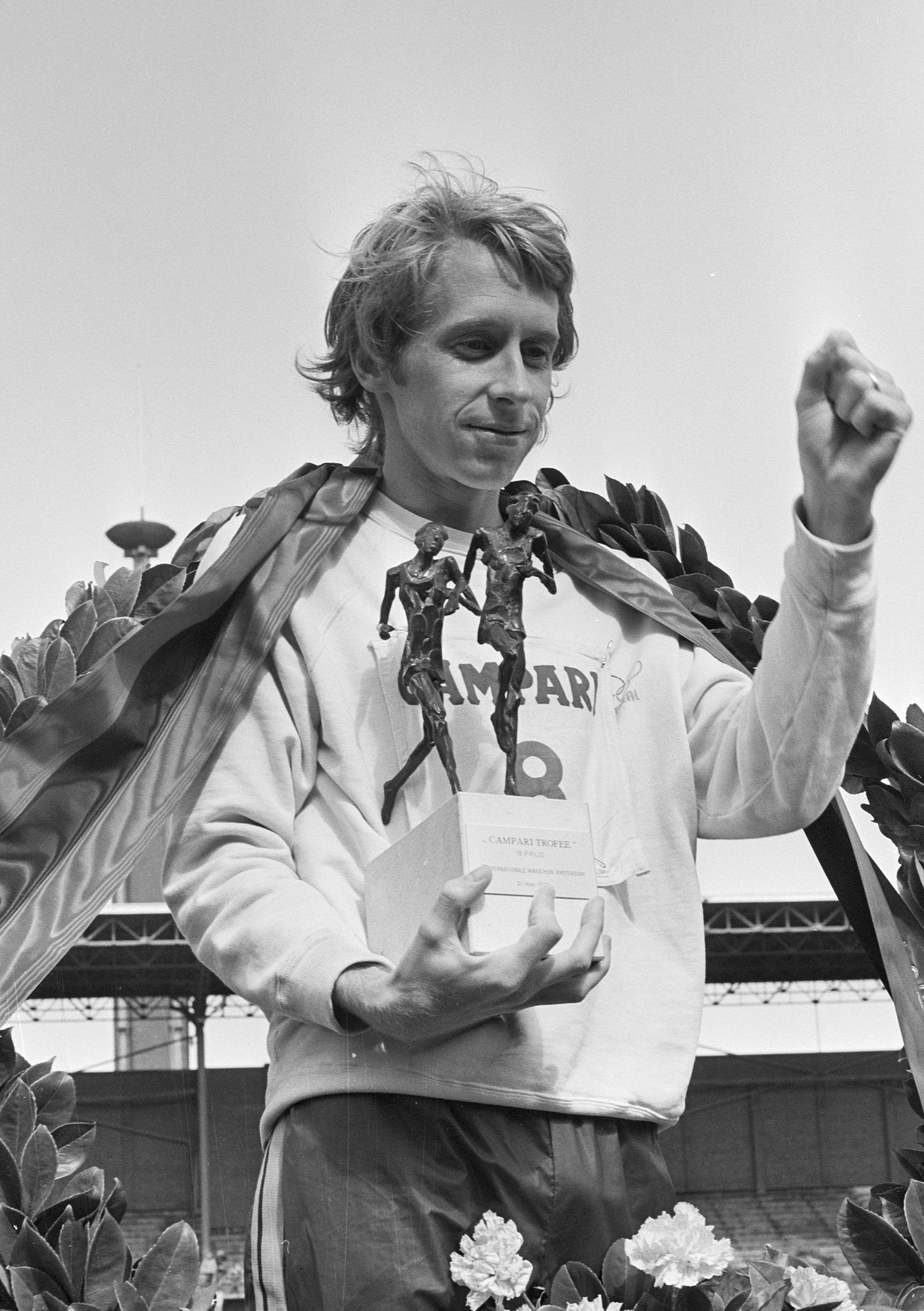
Bill Rodgers won the race four times.

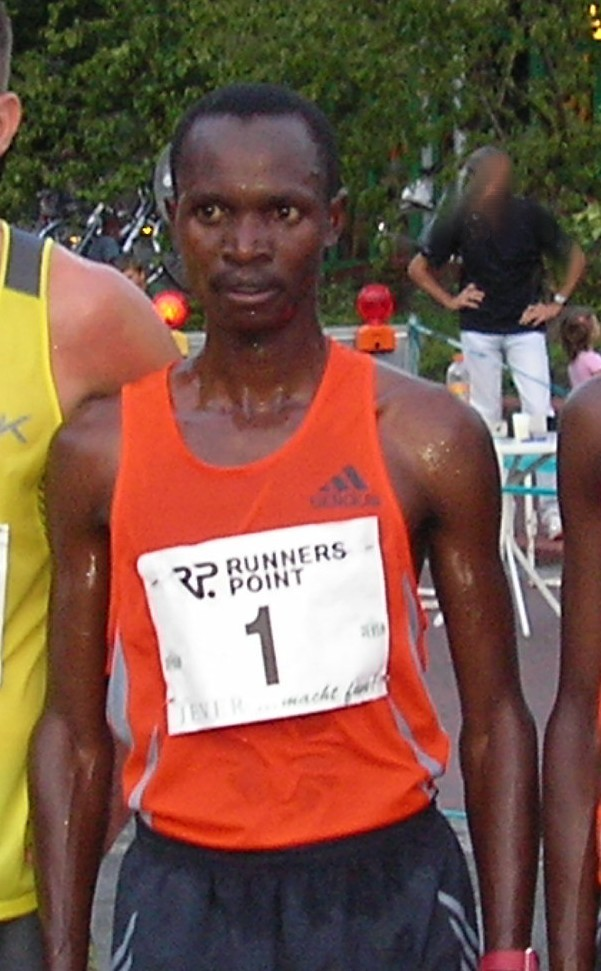
Rodgers Rop won the 2002 New York City Marathon.

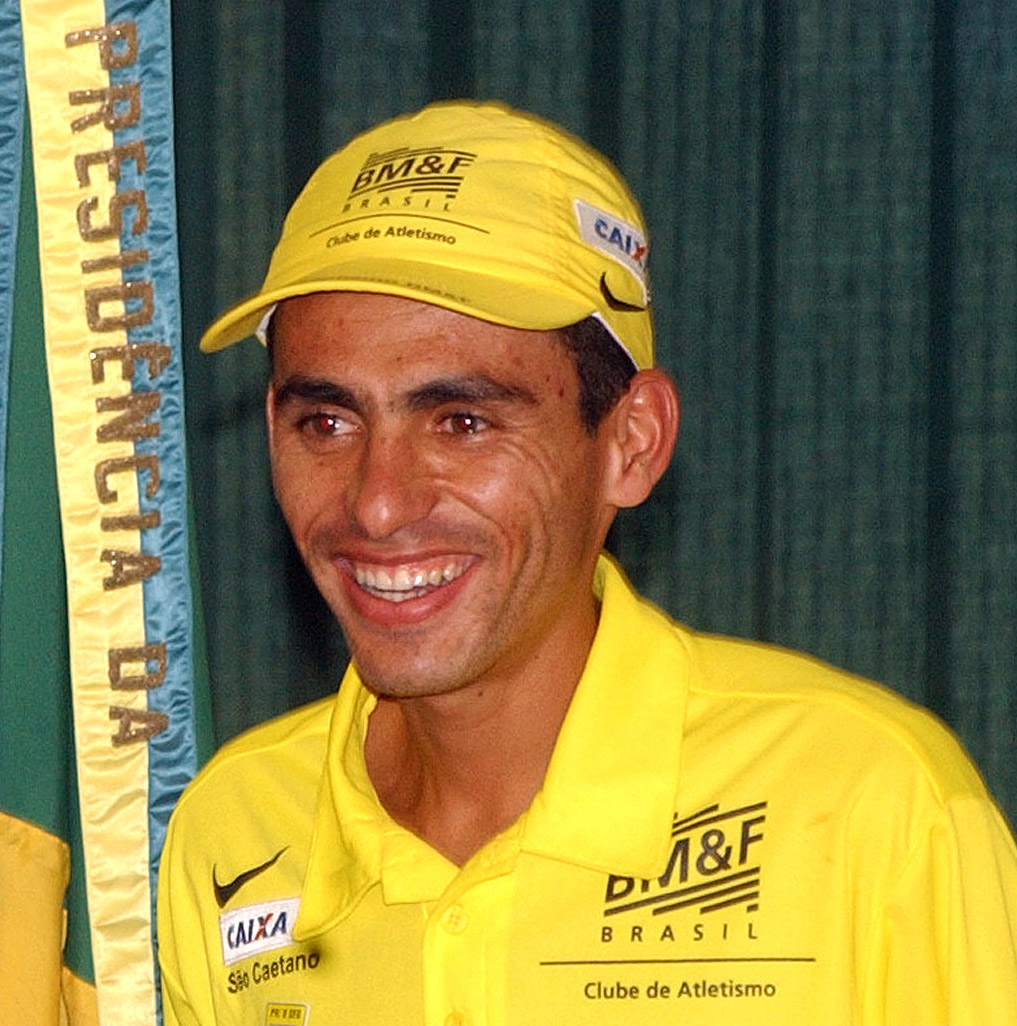
Marílson Gomes dos Santos, who won the 2006 and 2008 New York City Marathons, is the first and only Brazilian to win the race.

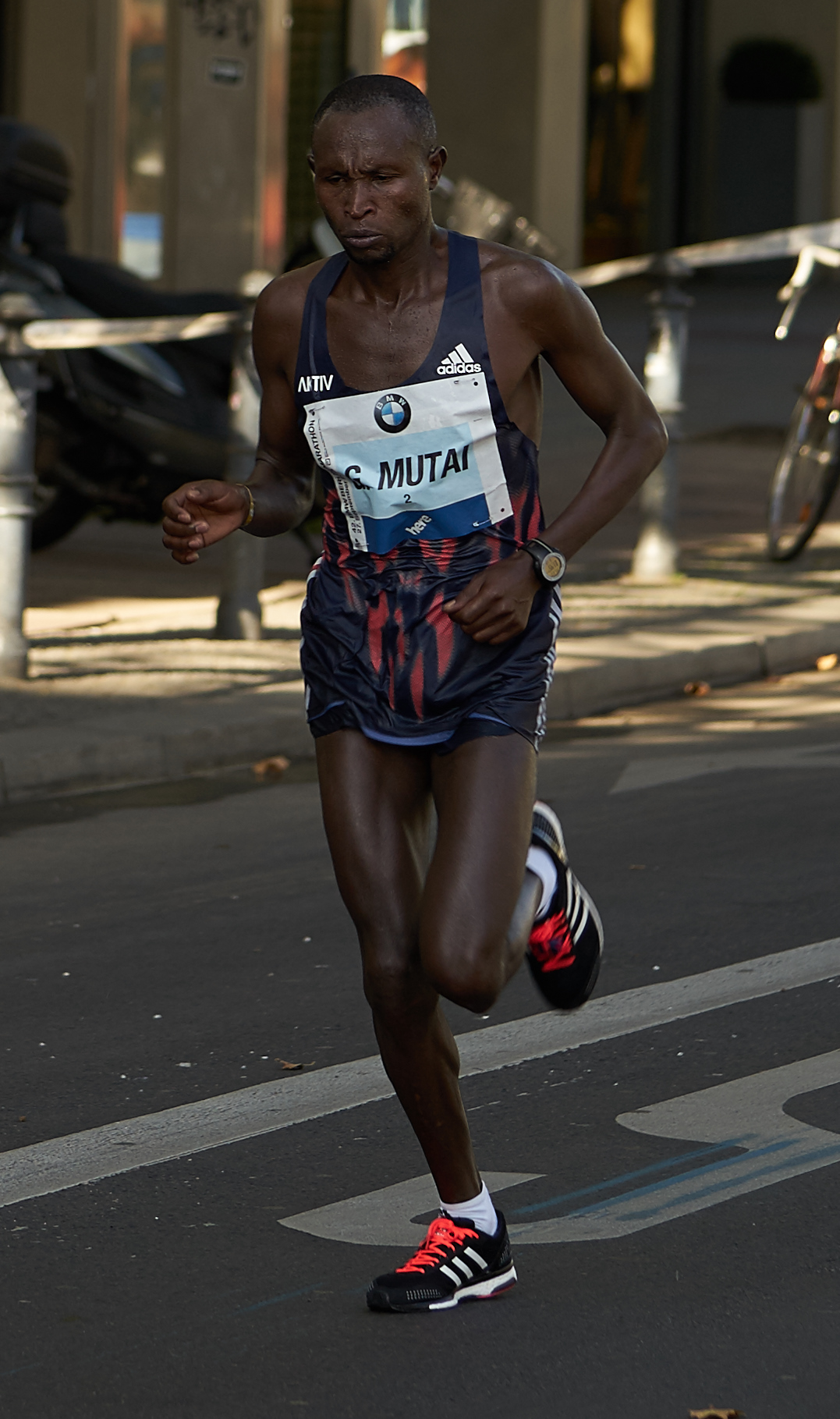
Geoffrey Mutai won the 2011 and 2013 New York City Marathons, and held the course record for twelve years.

Current course record
Course record
Short course

Winners: Men's open division
Year	Winner	Country	Time	Notes
1970	Gary Muhrcke	United States	2:31:38	Course record
1971	Norman Higgins	United States	2:22:54	Course record
1972	Sheldon Karlin	United States	2:27:52	
1973	Tom Fleming	United States	2:21:54	Course record
1974	Norbert Sander	United States	2:26:30	
1975	Tom Fleming	United States	2:19:27	Course record, second victory
1976	Bill Rodgers	United States	2:10:10	Course record
1977	Bill Rodgers	United States	2:11:28	Second victory
1978	Bill Rodgers	United States	2:12:12	Third victory
1979	Bill Rodgers	United States	2:11:42	Fourth victory
1980	Alberto Salazar	United States	2:09:41	Course record
1981	Alberto Salazar	United States	2:08:13	Course record (course measured short), second victory
1982	Alberto Salazar	United States	2:09:29	Third victory
1983	Rod Dixon	New Zealand	2:08:59	
1984	Orlando Pizzolato	Italy	2:14:53	
1985	Orlando Pizzolato	Italy	2:11:34	Second victory
1986	Gianni Poli	Italy	2:11:06	
1987	Ibrahim Hussein	Kenya	2:11:01	
1988	Steve Jones	United Kingdom	2:08:20	
1989	Juma Ikangaa	Tanzania	2:08:01	Course record
1990	Douglas Wakiihuri	Kenya	2:12:39	
1991	Salvador García	Mexico	2:09:28	
1992	Willie Mtolo	South Africa	2:09:29	
1993	Andrés Espinosa	Mexico	2:10:04	
1994	Germán Silva	Mexico	2:11:21	
1995	Germán Silva	Mexico	2:11:00	Second victory
1996	Giacomo Leone	Italy	2:09:54	
1997	John Kagwe	Kenya	2:08:12	
1998	John Kagwe	Kenya	2:08:45	Second victory
1999	Joseph Chebet	Kenya	2:09:14	
2000	Abdelkader El Mouaziz	Morocco	2:10:09	
2001	Tesfaye Jifar	Ethiopia	2:07:43	Course record
2002	Rodgers Rop	Kenya	2:08:07	
2003	Martin Lel	Kenya	2:10:30	
2004	Hendrick Ramaala	South Africa	2:09:28	
2005	Paul Tergat	Kenya	2:09:30	
2006	Marílson Gomes dos Santos	Brazil	2:09:58	
2007	Martin Lel	Kenya	2:09:04	Second victory
2008	Marílson Gomes dos Santos	Brazil	2:08:43	Second victory
2009	Meb Keflezighi	United States	2:09:15	
2010	Gebregziabher Gebremariam	Ethiopia	2:08:14	
2011	Geoffrey Mutai	Kenya	2:05:06	Course record
2012	Canceled due to Hurricane Sandy			
2013	Geoffrey Mutai	Kenya	2:08:24	Second victory
2014	Wilson Kipsang	Kenya	2:10:59	
2015	Stanley Biwott	Kenya	2:10:34	
2016	Ghirmay Ghebreslassie	Eritrea	2:07:51	
2017	Geoffrey Kamworor	Kenya	2:10:53	
2018	Lelisa Desisa	Ethiopia	2:05:59	
2019	Geoffrey Kamworor	Kenya	2:08:13	Second victory
2020	Kevin Quinn	United Kingdom	2:23:48	Virtual event held due to the COVID-19 pandemic
2021	Albert Korir	Kenya	2:08:22	
2022	Evans Chebet	Kenya	2:08:41	
2023	Tamirat Tola	Ethiopia	2:04:58	Current course record
2024	Abdi Nageeye	Netherlands	2:07:39	
2025	Benson Kipruto	Kenya	2:08:09	
2026	Andreas Almgren	Sweden	2:06:01	First marathon

=== Women's open division ===
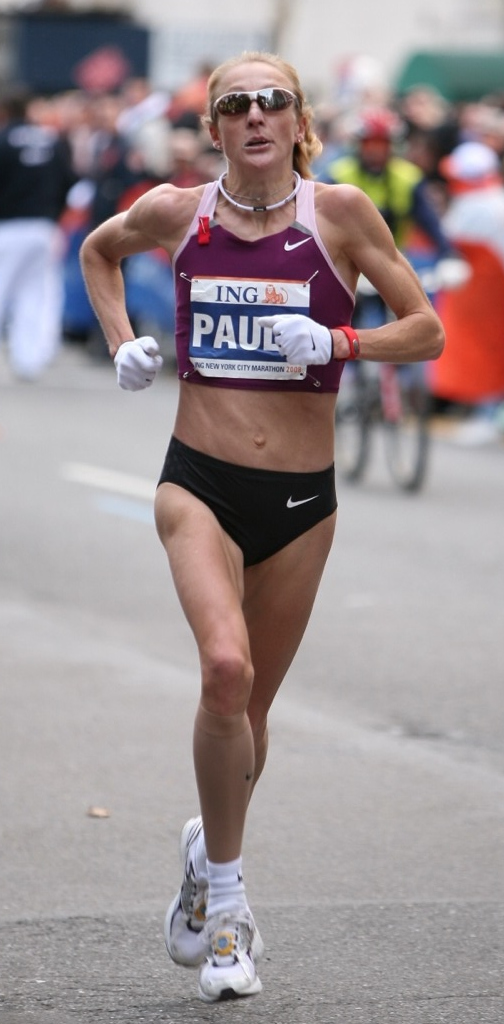
Paula Radcliffe won the 2004, 2007 and 2008 New York City Marathons.

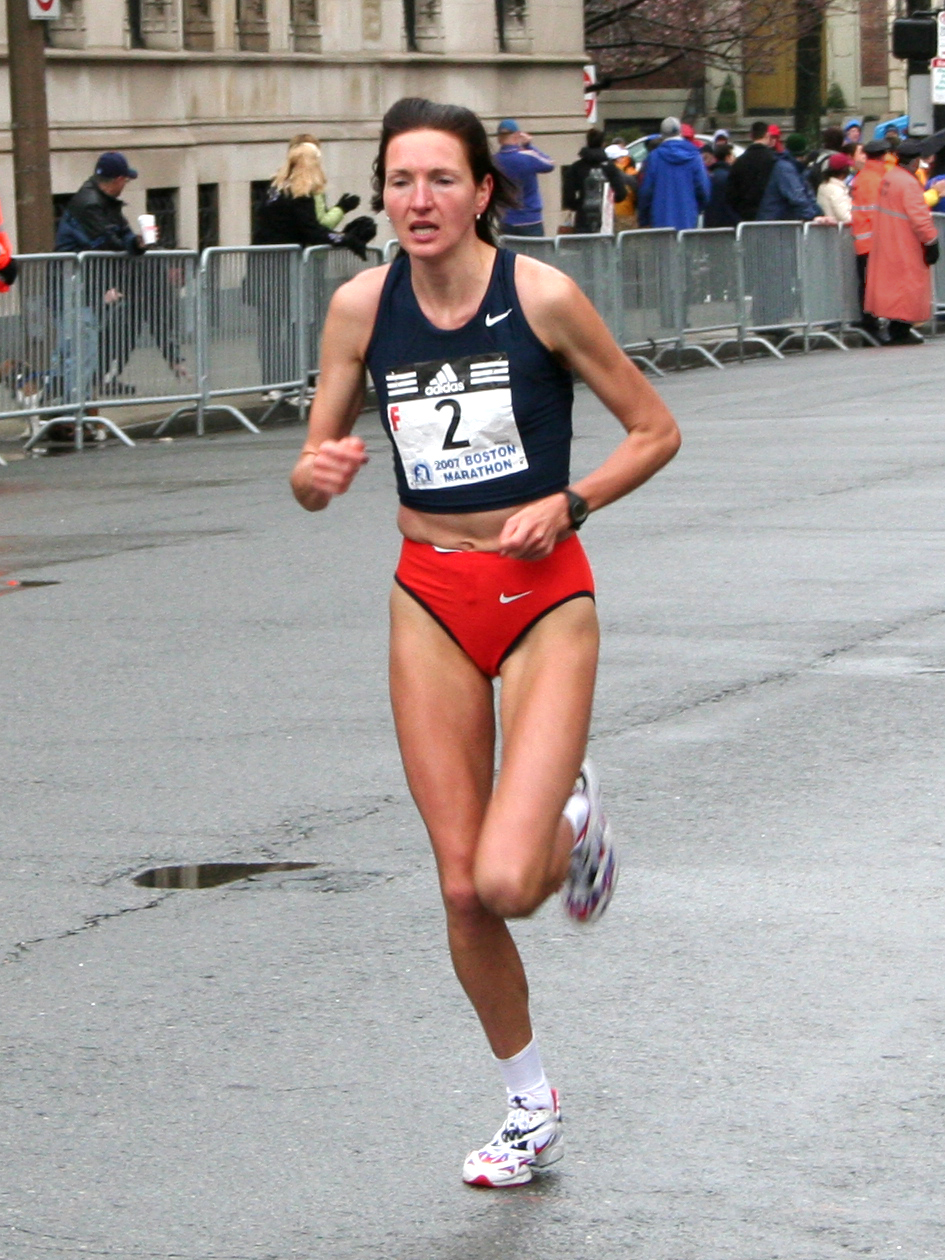
Jeļena Prokopčuka, who won the 2005 and 2006 New York City Marathons, was the first and only Latvian runner to win in either division.

World record
Current course record
Course record
Short course

Winners: Women's open division
Year	Winner	Country	Time	Notes
1970	No female finishers.			
1971	Beth Bonner	United States	2:55:22	World record
1972	Nina Kuscsik	United States	3:08:41	
1973	Nina Kuscsik	United States	2:57:07	Second victory
1974	Kathrine Switzer	United States	3:07:29	
1975	Kim Merritt	United States	2:46:14	Course record
1976	Miki Gorman	United States	2:39:11	Course record
1977	Miki Gorman	United States	2:43:10	Second victory
1978	Grete Waitz	Norway	2:32:30	World record
1979	Grete Waitz	Norway	2:27:33	World record, second victory
1980	Grete Waitz	Norway	2:25:42	World record, third victory
1981	Allison Roe	New Zealand	2:25:29	Course record (course measured short)
1982	Grete Waitz	Norway	2:27:14	Fourth victory
1983	Grete Waitz	Norway	2:27:00	Fifth victory
1984	Grete Waitz	Norway	2:29:30	Sixth victory
1985	Grete Waitz	Norway	2:28:34	Seventh victory
1986	Grete Waitz	Norway	2:28:06	Eighth victory
1987	Priscilla Welch	United Kingdom	2:30:17	
1988	Grete Waitz	Norway	2:28:07	Ninth victory
1989	Ingrid Kristiansen	Norway	2:25:30	
1990	Wanda Panfil	Poland	2:30:45	
1991	Liz McColgan	United Kingdom	2:27:32	
1992	Lisa Ondieki	Australia	2:24:40	Course record
1993	Uta Pippig	Germany	2:26:24	
1994	Tegla Loroupe	Kenya	2:27:37	
1995	Tegla Loroupe	Kenya	2:28:06	Second victory
1996	Anuța Cătună	Romania	2:28:18	
1997	Franziska Rochat-Moser	Switzerland	2:28:43	
1998	Franca Fiacconi	Italy	2:25:17	
1999	Adriana Fernández	Mexico	2:25:06	
2000	Lyudmila Petrova	Russia	2:25:45	
2001	Margaret Okayo	Kenya	2:24:21	Course record
2002	Joyce Chepchumba	Kenya	2:25:56	
2003	Margaret Okayo	Kenya	2:22:31	Former course record, second victory
2004	Paula Radcliffe	United Kingdom	2:23:10	
2005	Jeļena Prokopčuka	Latvia	2:24:41	
2006	Jeļena Prokopčuka	Latvia	2:25:05	Second victory
2007	Paula Radcliffe	United Kingdom	2:23:09	Second victory
2008	Paula Radcliffe	United Kingdom	2:23:56	Third victory
2009	Derartu Tulu	Ethiopia	2:28:52	
2010	Edna Kiplagat	Kenya	2:28:20	
2011	Firehiwot Dado	Ethiopia	2:23:15	
2012	Canceled due to Hurricane Sandy			
2013	Priscah Jeptoo	Kenya	2:25:07	
2014	Mary Keitany	Kenya	2:25:07	
2015	Mary Keitany	Kenya	2:24:25	Second victory
2016	Mary Keitany	Kenya	2:24:26	Third victory
2017	Shalane Flanagan	United States	2:26:53	
2018	Mary Keitany	Kenya	2:22:48	Fourth victory
2019	Joyciline Jepkosgei	Kenya	2:22:38	
2020	Stephanie Bruce	United States	2:35:28	Virtual event held due to the COVID-19 pandemic
2021	Peres Jepchirchir	Kenya	2:22:39	
2022	Sharon Lokedi	Kenya	2:23:23	
2023	Hellen Obiri	Kenya	2:27:23	
2024	Sheila Chepkirui	Kenya	2:24:35	
2025	Hellen Obiri	Kenya	2:19:51	Course record, second victory
2026	Sheila Chepkirui	Kenya	2:24:36	Second victory

=== Men's wheelchair division ===
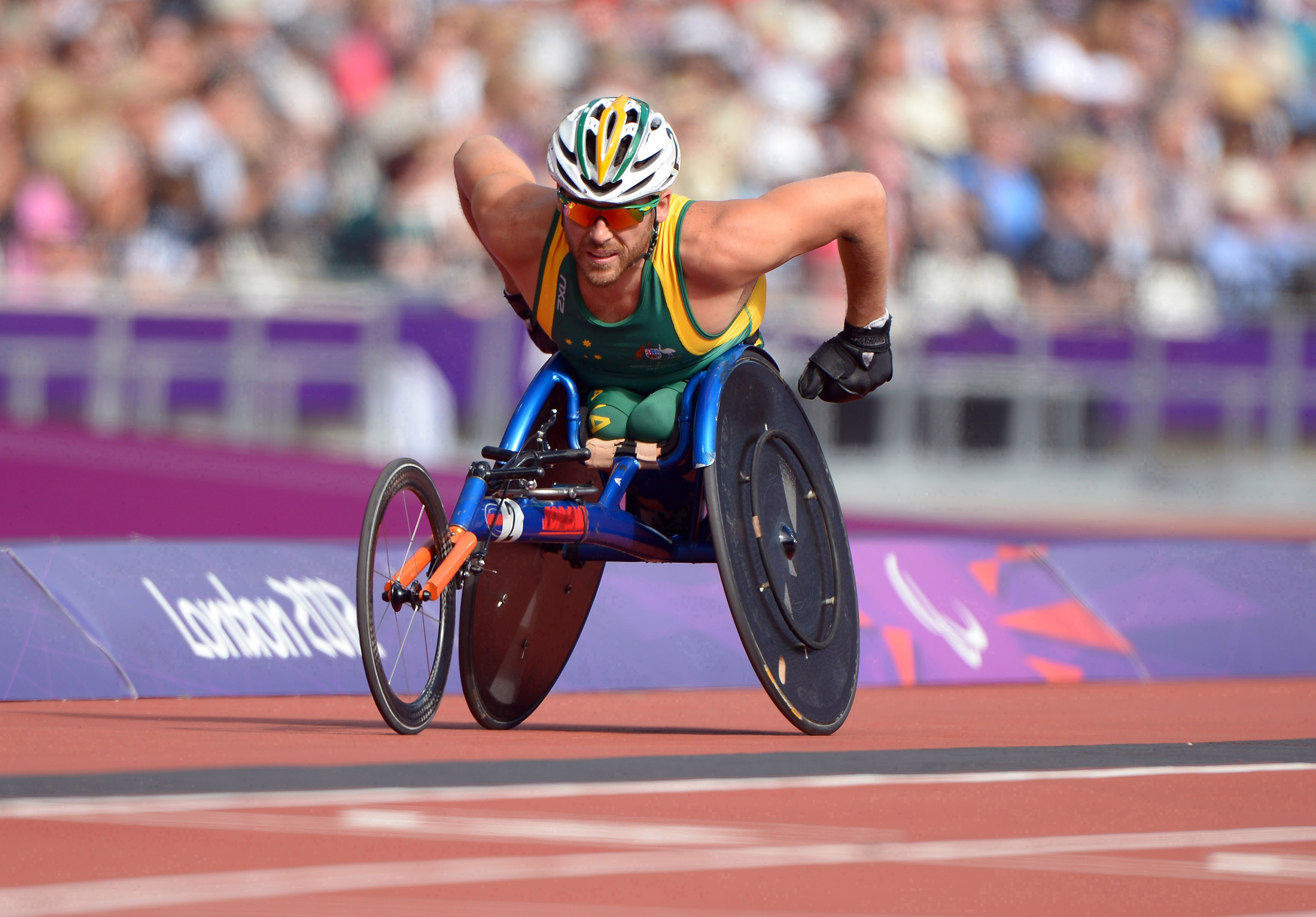
Kurt Fearnley won the race four times in a row from 2006 to 2009, and holds the current course record.

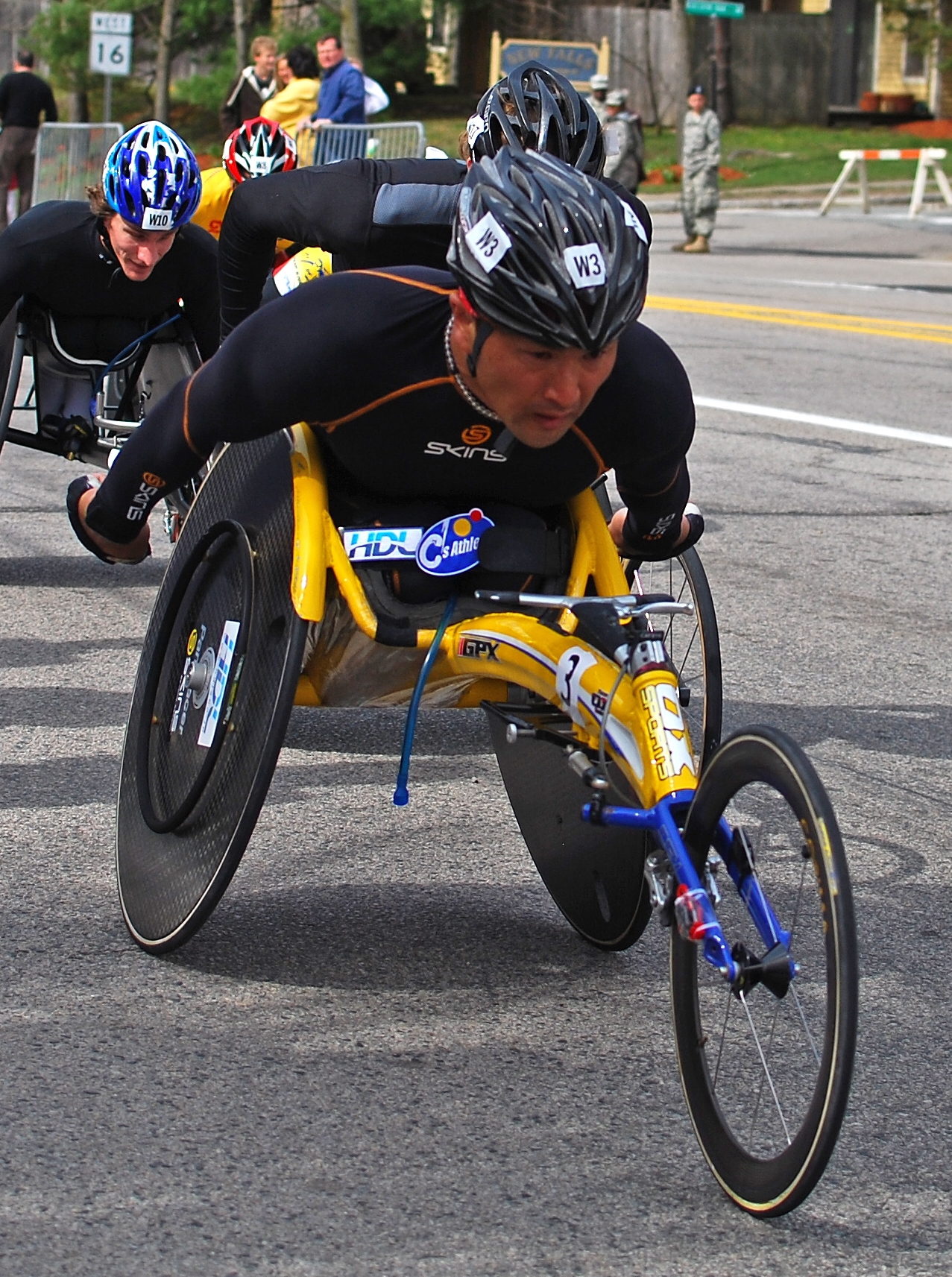
Masazumi Soejima won the race in 2011.

Current course record
Course record
Short course

Winners: Men's wheelchair division
Year	Winner	Country	Time	Notes
2000	Kamel Ayari	Tunisia	1:53:50	
2001	Saúl Mendoza	Mexico	1:39:29	Course record
2002	Krige Schabort	South Africa	1:38:27	Course record
2003	Krige Schabort	South Africa	1:32:19	Course record, second victory
2004	Saúl Mendoza	Mexico	1:33:16	Second victory
2005	Ernst van Dyk	South Africa	1:31:11	Course record
2006	Kurt Fearnley	Australia	1:29:22	Course record
2007	Kurt Fearnley	Australia	1:33:58	Second victory
2008	Kurt Fearnley	Australia	1:44:51	Third victory
2009	Kurt Fearnley	Australia	1:35:58	Fourth victory
2010	David Weir	United Kingdom	1:37:29	
2011	Masazumi Soejima	Japan	1:31:41	
2012	Canceled due to Hurricane Sandy			
2013	Marcel Hug	Switzerland	1:40:14	
2014	Kurt Fearnley	Australia	1:30:55	Fifth victory, shortened 23.2 mile course (Note: Due to strong winds in 2014, the wheelchair race start was moved to after the Verrazzano–Narrows Bridge, reducing the race distance to 23.2 miles.)
2015	Ernst van Dyk	South Africa	1:30:54	Second victory
2016	Marcel Hug	Switzerland	1:35:44	Second victory
2017	Marcel Hug	Switzerland	1:37:17	Third victory
2018	Daniel Romanchuk	United States	1:36:21	
2019	Daniel Romanchuk	United States	1:37:24	Second victory
2020	Canceled due to the COVID-19 pandemic			
2021	Marcel Hug	Switzerland	1:31:24	Fourth victory
2022	Marcel Hug	Switzerland	1:25:26	Current course record, fifth victory
2023	Marcel Hug	Switzerland	1:25:29	Sixth victory
2024	Daniel Romanchuk	United States	1:36:31	Third victory
2025	Marcel Hug	Switzerland	1:30:16	Seventh victory
2026	Marcel Hug	Switzerland	1:28:14	Eighth victory

=== Women's wheelchair division ===
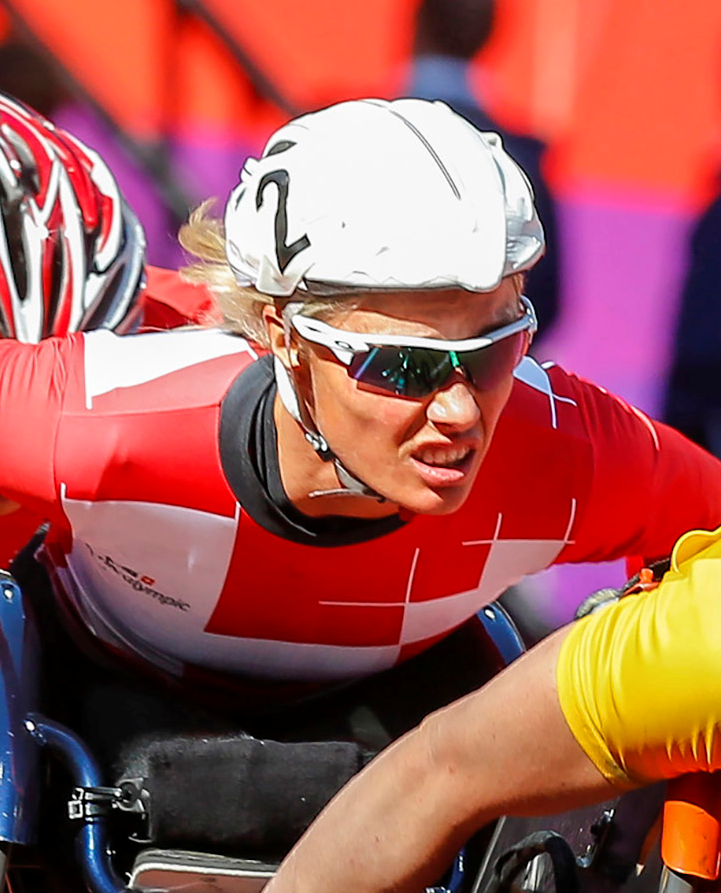
Edith Hunkeler has won the women's wheelchair race five times, more than any other athlete.

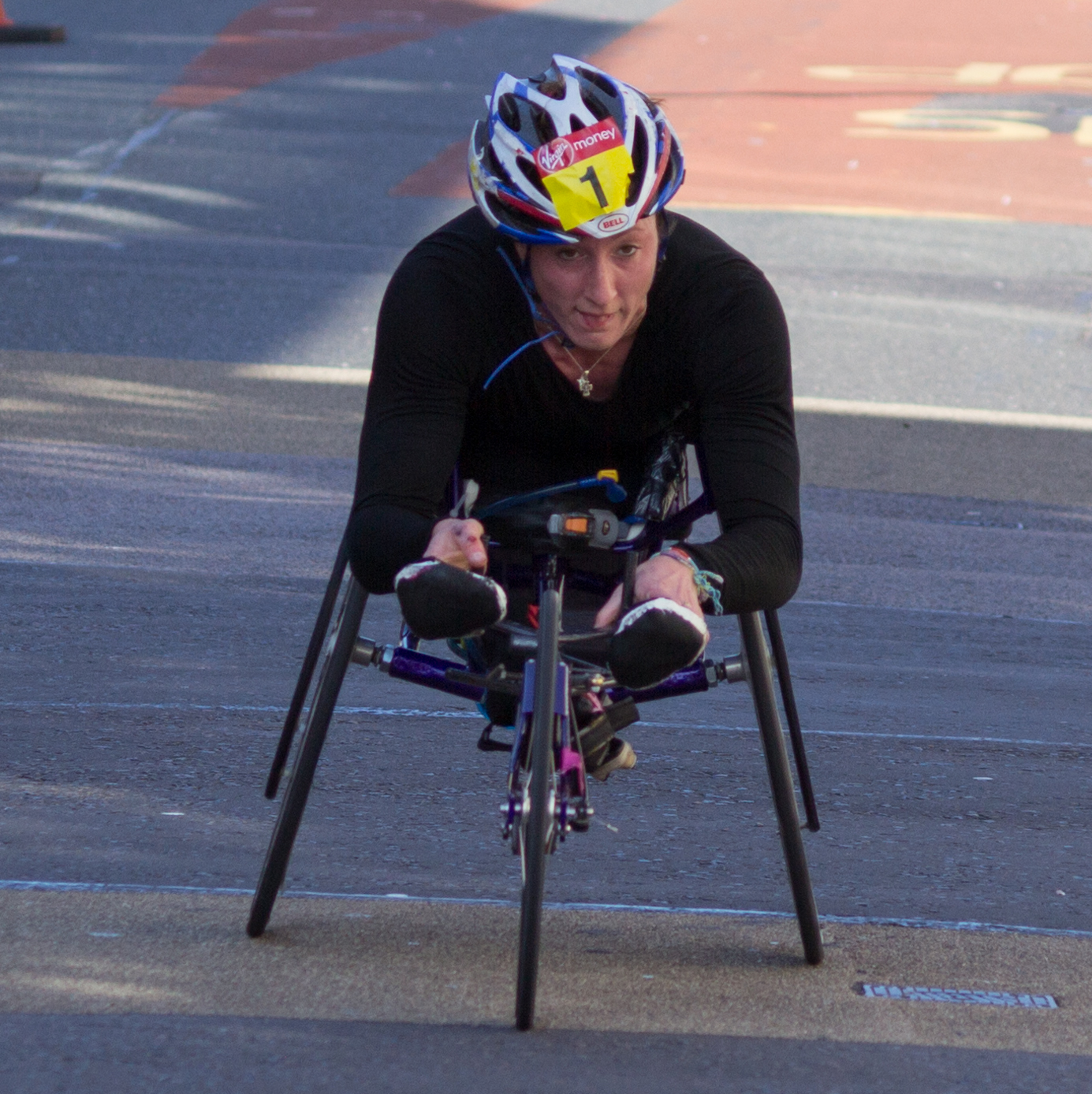
Tatyana McFadden, who won the race four times, holds the current course record.

Current course record
Course record
Short course

Winners: Women's wheelchair division
Year	Winner	Country	Time	Notes
2000	Anh Nguyen Thi Xuan	Vietnam	2:46:47	Course record
2001	Francesca Porcellato	Italy	2:08:51	Course record
2002	Cheri Blauwet	United States	2:14:39	
2003	Cheri Blauwet	United States	1:59:30	Course record, second victory
2004	Edith Hunkeler	Switzerland	1:53:27	Course record
2005	Edith Hunkeler	Switzerland	1:54:52	Second victory
2006	Amanda McGrory	United States	1:54:17	
2007	Edith Hunkeler	Switzerland	1:52:38	Course record, third victory
2008	Edith Hunkeler	Switzerland	2:06:42	Fourth victory
2009	Edith Hunkeler	Switzerland	1:58:15	Fifth victory
2010	Tatyana McFadden	United States	2:02:22	
2011	Amanda McGrory	United States	1:50:25	Course record
2012	Canceled due to Hurricane Sandy			
2013	Tatyana McFadden	United States	1:59:13	Second victory
2014	Tatyana McFadden	United States	1:42:16	Third victory, 23.2 mile course
2015	Tatyana McFadden	United States	1:43:04	Course record, fourth victory
2016	Tatyana McFadden	United States	1:47:43	Fifth victory
2017	Manuela Schär	Switzerland	1:48:09	
2018	Manuela Schär	Switzerland	1:50:27	Second victory
2019	Manuela Schär	Switzerland	1:44:20	Third victory
2020	Canceled due to the COVID-19 pandemic			
2021	Madison de Rozario	Australia	1:51:01	
2022	Susannah Scaroni	United States	1:42:43	Course record
2023	Catherine Debrunner	Switzerland	1:39:32	Current course record
2024	Susannah Scaroni	United States	1:48:05	Second victory
2025	Susannah Scaroni	United States	1:42:10	Third victory
2026	Catherine Debrunner	Switzerland	1:40:02	Second victory

== Victories by nationality ==
Country	Open division		Wheelchair division		Total
Country	Men's	Women's	Men's	Women's	Total
United States	14	9	3	13	39
Kenya	17	17	0	0	34
Switzerland	0	1	8	9	18
Norway	0	10	0	0	10
United Kingdom	2	5	1	0	8
Australia	0	1	5	1	7
Mexico	4	1	2	0	7
Ethiopia	4	2	0	0	6
Italy	4	1	0	1	6
South Africa	2	0	4	0	6
Brazil	2	0	0	0	2
Latvia	0	2	0	0	2
New Zealand	1	1	0	0	2
Eritrea	1	0	0	0	1
Netherlands	1	0	0	0	1
Sweden	1	0	0	0	1
Germany	0	1	0	0	1
Japan	0	0	1	0	1
Morocco	1	0	0	0	1
Poland	0	1	0	0	1
Romania	0	1	0	0	1
Russia	0	1	0	0	1
Tanzania	1	0	0	0	1
Tunisia	0	0	1	0	1
Vietnam	0	0	0	1	1

== Notes and references ==
=== Sources ===
- 2023 TCS New York City Marathon Media Guide. New York: New York Road Runners.
