= 1998 New York City Marathon =

Footrace held in New York City

29th New York City Marathon
- Venue: New York City, New York
- Date: November 1

Champions
- Men: John Kagwe (2:08:45)
- Women: Franca Fiacconi (2:25:17)

The 1998 New York City Marathon was the 29th running of the annual marathon race in New York City, New York, which took place on Sunday, November 1. The men's elite race was won by Kenya's John Kagwe in a time of 2:08:45 hours while the women's race was won by Italy's Franca Fiacconi in 2:25:17.

A total of 31,539 runners finished the race, 22,587 men and 8952 women.

== Results ==
=== Men ===
| Position | Athlete | Nationality | Time |
|---|---|---|---|
| 1st place, gold medalist(s) | John Kagwe | Kenya | 2:08:45 |
| 2nd place, silver medalist(s) | Joseph Chebet | Kenya | 2:08:48 |
| 3rd place, bronze medalist(s) | Zebedayo Bayo | Tanzania | 2:08:51 |
| 4 | Germán Silva | Mexico | 2:10:24 |
| 5 | Vanderlei de Lima | Brazil | 2:10:42 |
| 6 | Roberto Barbi | Italy | 2:10:55 |
| 7 | Simon Chemoiywo | Kenya | 2:11:08 |
| 8 | Peter Githuka | Kenya | 2:11:20 |
| 9 | Shem Kororia | Kenya | 2:11:27 |
| 10 | Jonathan Ndambuki | Kenya | 2:11:30 |
| 11 | Leonid Shvetsov | Russia | 2:11:50 |
| 12 | Róbert Štefko | Slovakia | 2:12:52 |
| 13 | Fred Kiprop | Kenya | 2:13:32 |
| 14 | Daniel Kirwa Too | Kenya | 2:13:54 |
| 15 | Gemechu Kebede | Ethiopia | 2:15:04 |
| 16 | Tesfaye Bekele | Ethiopia | 2:15:23 |
| 17 | Isidro Rico | Mexico | 2:15:52 |
| 18 | Alfredo Vigueras | United States | 2:16:14 |
| 19 | Orlando Guerrero | Colombia | 2:16:47 |
| 20 | Peter Ndirangu | Kenya | 2:16:59 |
| — | Abel Antón | Spain | DNF |
| — | Josia Thugwane | South Africa | DNF |
| — | Joseph Kariuki | Kenya | DNF |
| — | Dionísio Castro | Portugal | DNF |
| — | Paul Pilkington | United States | DNF |
| — | Godfrey Nyombi | Uganda | DNF |
| — | Juan Carlos Gutierrez | Colombia | DNF |
| — | Diamantino dos Santos | Brazil | DNF |
| — | Carlos Grisales | Colombia | DNF |
| — | Michael Mykytok | United States | DNF |
| — | Jean Verster | South Africa | DNF |

=== Women ===
| Position | Athlete | Nationality | Time |
|---|---|---|---|
| 1st place, gold medalist(s) | Franca Fiacconi | Italy | 2:25:17 |
| 2nd place, silver medalist(s) | Adriana Fernández | Mexico | 2:26:33 |
| 3rd place, bronze medalist(s) | Tegla Loroupe | Kenya | 2:30:28 |
| 4 | Lyudmila Petrova | Russia | 2:31:09 |
| 5 | Franziska Rochat-Moser | Switzerland | 2:32:37 |
| 6 | Libbie Hickman | United States | 2:33:06 |
| 7 | Viviany de Oliveira | Brazil | 2:35:12 |
| 8 | Rakiya Maraoui-Quétier | France | 2:35:59 |
| 9 | Alena Vinnitskaya | Belarus | 2:36:53 |
| 10 | Márcia Narloch | Brazil | 2:37:33 |
| 11 | Zofia Wieciorkowska | Poland | 2:40:39 |
| 12 | Joan Samuelson | United States | 2:41:06 |
| 13 | Anne-Marie Lauck | United States | 2:42:52 |
| 14 | Marinella Curreli | Italy | 2:44:30 |
| 15 | Nili Abramski | Israel | 2:45:19 |
| 16 | Leteyesus Berhe | Ethiopia | 2:45:38 |
| 17 | Kimberly Griffin | United States | 2:46:17 |
| 18 | Antonella Bizioli | Italy | 2:46:30 |
| 19 | Gillian Horovitz | United Kingdom | 2:46:36 |
| 20 | Montserrat Martínez | Spain | 2:47:31 |
| — | Anuța Cătună | Romania | DNF |
| — | Maria das Graças | Brazil | DNF |
| — | Madina Biktagirova | Russia | DNF |
| — | Olga Appell | United States | DNF |
