= 1990 New York City Marathon =

Footrace held in New York City

21st New York City Marathon
- Location: New York City, New York
- Date: November 4

Champions
- Men: Douglas Wakiihuri (2:12:39)
- Women: Wanda Panfil (2:30:45)

The 1990 New York City Marathon was the 21st running of the annual marathon race in New York City, New York, which took place on Sunday, November 4. The men's elite race was won by Kenya's Douglas Wakiihuri in a time of 2:12:39 hours while the women's race was won by Poland's Wanda Panfil in 2:30:45.

A total of 23,774 runners finished the race, 19,274 men and 4500 women.

== Results ==
=== Men ===
Position	Athlete	Nationality	Time
1st place, gold medalist(s)	Douglas Wakiihuri	Kenya	2:12:39
2nd place, silver medalist(s)	Salvador García	Mexico	2:13:19
3rd place, bronze medalist(s)	Steve Brace	United Kingdom	2:13:32
4	Juma Ikangaa	Tanzania	2:14:32
5	John Campbell	New Zealand	2:14:34
6	Peter Maher	Canada	2:15:05
7	Filemón López	Mexico	2:16:33
8	Yakov Tolstikov	Soviet Union	2:16:38
9	Herbert Steffny	Germany	2:16:47
10	Pedro Ortiz	Colombia	2:16:57
11	Rafael Zepeda	Mexico	2:17:01
12	Jouni Kortelainen	Finland	2:18:38
13	Juan Antonio Crespo	Spain	2:18:43
14	Abdelmajid Echerkaoui	Morocco	2:18:55
15	Marti ten Kate	Netherlands	2:19:16
16	Jesús Herrera	Mexico	2:19:41
17	Tommy Ekblom	Finland	2:20:29
18	Volmir Herbstrith	Brazil	2:20:33
19	Carlos Rivas Salas	Mexico	2:20:37
20	Ryszard Marczak	Poland	2:20:51
—	Paul Evans	United Kingdom	DNF
—	Ken Martin	United States	DNF
—	Nivaldo Filho	Brazil	DNF
—	Brian Sheriff	Zimbabwe	DNF
—	Nikolay Tabak	Soviet Union	DNF

=== Women ===
Position	Athlete	Nationality	Time
1st place, gold medalist(s)	Wanda Panfil	Poland	2:30:45
2nd place, silver medalist(s)	Kim Jones	United States	2:30:50
3rd place, bronze medalist(s)	Katrin Dörre-Heinig	Germany	2:33:21
4	Grete Waitz	Norway	2:34:34
5	Tatyana Zuyeva	Soviet Union	2:35:48
6	Jocelyne Villeton	France	2:36:12
7	Zoya Ivanova	Soviet Union	2:36:29
8	Nancy Ditz	United States	2:37:15
9	Evy Palm	Sweden	2:38:00
10	Lisa Vaill	United States	2:38:05
11	Véronique Marot	United Kingdom	2:38:40
12	Odette Lapierre	Canada	2:38:48
13	Julie Isphording	United States	2:42:21
14	Luzia Sahli	Switzerland	2:44:09
15	Sinikka Keskitalo	Finland	2:44:13
16	Gillian Beschloss	United Kingdom	2:45:24
17	Emperatriz Wilson	Cuba	2:46:03
18	Gillian Horovitz	United Kingdom	2:47:01
19	Carmem de Oliveira	Brazil	2:47:59
20	Nadezhda Gumerova	Soviet Union	2:52:07
—	Susan Sirma	Kenya	DNF
—	Ria Van Landeghem	Belgium	DNF
—	Margaret Groos	United States	DNF
