= 2007 New York City Marathon =

Running race in 2007

38th New York City Marathon
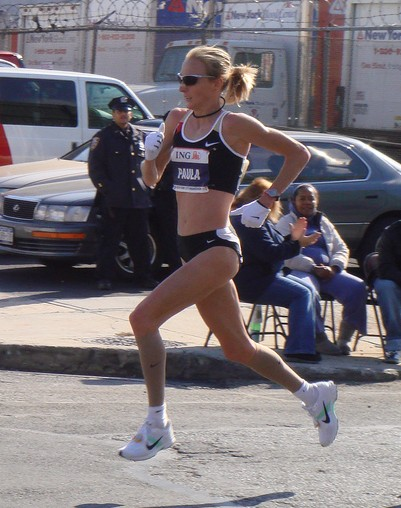
- Paula Radcliffe during the race
- Location: New York City, New York
- Date: November 4

Champions
- Men: Martin Lel (2:09:04)
- Women: Paula Radcliffe (2:23:09)
- Wheelchair men: Kurt Fearnley (1:33:58)
- Wheelchair women: Edith Hunkeler (1:52:38)

The 2007 New York City Marathon was the 38th running of the annual marathon race in New York City, New York, which took place on Sunday, November 4. The men's elite race was won by Kenya's Martin Lel in a time of 2:09:04 hours while the women's race was won by Great Britain's Paula Radcliffe in 2:23:09.

In the wheelchair races, Australia's Kurt Fearnley (1:33:58) and Switzerland's Edith Hunkeler (1:52:38) won the men's and women's divisions, respectively. In the handcycle race, Americans Alejandro Albor (1:17:48) and Helene Hines (1:57:18) were the winners.

A total of 38,557 runners finished the race, 26,042 men and 12,515 women.

== Results ==
=== Men ===
Position	Athlete	Nationality	Time
1st place, gold medalist(s)	Martin Lel	Kenya	2:09:03.9
2nd place, silver medalist(s)	Abderrahim Goumri	Morocco	2:09:16.0
3rd place, bronze medalist(s)	Hendrick Ramaala	South Africa	2:11:24.7
4	Stefano Baldini	Italy	2:11:57.9
5	James Kwambai	Kenya	2:12:24.5
6	Ruggero Pertile	Italy	2:13:01
7	Stephen Kiogora	Kenya	2:13:41
8	Marílson Gomes dos Santos	Brazil	2:13:47
9	Oleksandr Kuzin	Ukraine	2:14:01
10	William Kipsang	Kenya	2:15:32
11	Elias Kemboi	Kenya	2:17:26
12	Rodgers Rop	Kenya	2:18:10
13	Demesse Tefera	Ethiopia	2:19:33
14	Genna Tufa	Ethiopia	2:20:15
15	Francisco Bautista	Mexico	2:21:15
16	Joseph Chirlee	Kenya	2:23:01
17	Bruce Deacon	Canada	2:24:19
18	Kassahun Kabiso	Ethiopia	2:25:05
19	Worku Beyi	Ethiopia	2:25:56
20	Valerio Brignone	Italy	2:26:05
—	Dmytro Baranovskyy	Ukraine	DNF
—	Julius Kibet	Kenya	DNF
—	Samuel Ndereba	Kenya	DNF

=== Women ===
Position	Athlete	Nationality	Time
1st place, gold medalist(s)	Paula Radcliffe	United Kingdom	2:23:09.0
2nd place, silver medalist(s)	Gete Wami	Ethiopia	2:23:31.8
3rd place, bronze medalist(s)	Jeļena Prokopčuka	Latvia	2:26:12.4
4	Lidiya Grigoryeva	Russia	2:28:36.4
5	Catherine Ndereba	Kenya	2:29:07.6
6	Elva Dryer	United States	2:35:15
7	Robyn Friedman	United States	2:39:19
8	Tegla Loroupe	Kenya	2:41:58
9	Melisa Christian	United States	2:42:07
10	Alvina Begay	United States	2:42:46
11	Christine Lundy	United States	2:43:21
12	Veena Reddy	United States	2:43:26
13	Caitlin Tormey	United States	2:43:30
14	Erin Moeller	United States	2:43:57
15	Nathalie Vasseur	France	2:44:00
16	Sopagna Eap	United States	2:44:37
17	Atalelech Ketema	Ethiopia	2:45:04
18	Viktoriya Ganushina	Ukraine	2:45:15
19	Heather Frisone	United States	2:45:56
20	Kristine Spence	United States	2:47:00
—	Constantina Diță	Romania	DNF
—	Claudia-Mariela Nero	Argentina	DNF

=== Wheelchair men ===
Position	Athlete	Nationality	Time
1st place, gold medalist(s)	Kurt Fearnley	Australia	1:33:58
2nd place, silver medalist(s)	Krige Schabort	United States	1:35:08
3rd place, bronze medalist(s)	Masazumi Soejima	Japan	1:36:16
4	Saúl Mendoza	United States	1:38:06
5	Aarón Gordian	Colombia	1:38:06
6	Josh George	United States	1:38:06
7	Roger Puigbò	Spain	1:38:07
8	Denis Lemeunier	France	1:39:21
9	Rafael Botello	Spain	1:39:46
10	Alain Fuss	France	1:41:55

=== Wheelchair women ===
Position	Athlete	Nationality	Time
1st place, gold medalist(s)	Edith Hunkeler	Switzerland	1:52:38
2nd place, silver medalist(s)	Shelly Woods	United Kingdom	1:54:19
3rd place, bronze medalist(s)	Amanda McGrory	United States	1:56:09
4	Chantal Petitclerc	Canada	1:57:44
5	Sandra Graf	Switzerland	1:58:10
6	Diane Roy	Canada	1:59:09
7	Wakako Tsuchida	Japan	2:01:48
8	Cheri Blauwet	United States	2:03:57
9	Christie Dawes	Australia	2:12:58
10	Francesca Porcellato	Italy	2:22:42

=== Handcycle men ===
Position	Athlete	Nationality	Time
1st place, gold medalist(s)	Alejandro Albor	United States	1:17:48
2nd place, silver medalist(s)	Edward Maalouf	Lebanon	1:23:17
3rd place, bronze medalist(s)	Arkadiusz Skrzypinski	Poland	1:27:34
4	Alex Zanardi	Italy	1:33:17
5	Keane West	United States	1:33:26

=== Handcycle women ===
Position	Athlete	Nationality	Time
1st place, gold medalist(s)	Helene Hines	United States	1:57:18
2nd place, silver medalist(s)	Minda Dentler	United States	2:19:06
3rd place, bronze medalist(s)	Irena Pienio	Poland	2:41:05
4	Rosemary Salak	United States	2:48:12
5	Nadine McNeil	United States	3:24:48
