= 1997 New York City Marathon =

Footrace held in New York City

28th New York City Marathon
- Venue: New York City, New York
- Date: November 2

Champions
- Men: John Kagwe (2:08:12)
- Women: Franziska Rochat-Moser (2:28:43)

The 1997 New York City Marathon was the 28th running of the annual marathon race in New York City, New York, which took place on Sunday, November 2. The men's elite race was won by Kenya's John Kagwe in a time of 2:08:12 hours while the women's race was won by Switzerland's Franziska Rochat-Moser in 2:28:43.

A total of 30,427 runners finished the race, 22,014 men and 8413 women.

== Results ==
=== Men ===
Position	Athlete	Nationality	Time
1st place, gold medalist(s)	John Kagwe	Kenya	2:08:12
2nd place, silver medalist(s)	Joseph Chebet	Kenya	2:09:27
3rd place, bronze medalist(s)	Stefano Baldini	Italy	2:09:31
4	Abdelkader El Mouaziz	Morocco	2:10:04
5	Germán Silva	Mexico	2:10:19
6	Domingos Castro	Portugal	2:10:23
7	Róbert Štefko	Slovakia	2:11:11
8	Dionicio Cerón	Mexico	2:13:01
9	Simon Lopuyet	Kenya	2:13:41
10	Saïd Belhout	Algeria	2:14:22
11	Kenjiro Jitsui	Japan	2:14:32
12	Spyros Andriopoulos	Greece	2:17:59
13	Carlos Grisales	Colombia	2:18:38
14	Jerod Neas	United States	2:19:07
15	Davide Milesi	Italy	2:19:25
16	Hamid Oscar	Djibouti	2:19:55
17	Mohamed Ouaadi	France	2:19:57
18	Mark Coogan	United States	2:20:41
19	Diamantino dos Santos	Brazil	2:21:16
20	Edmund Kramarz	Poland	2:21:18
—	Kenneth Cheruiyot	Kenya	DNF
—	Shem Kororia	Kenya	DNF
—	Peter Githuka	Kenya	DNF
—	Orlando Guerrero	Colombia	DNF

=== Women ===
Position	Athlete	Nationality	Time
1st place, gold medalist(s)	Franziska Rochat-Moser	Switzerland	2:28:43
2nd place, silver medalist(s)	Colleen De Reuck	South Africa	2:29:11
3rd place, bronze medalist(s)	Franca Fiacconi	Italy	2:30:15
4	Anuța Cătună	Romania	2:31:24
5	Ornella Ferrara	Italy	2:31:44
6	Kim Jones	United States	2:32:00
7	Tegla Loroupe	Kenya	2:32:07
8	Serap Aktaş	Turkey	2:33:31
9	Mónica Pont	Spain	2:36:04
10	Sonja Oberem	Germany	2:36:22
11	Yelena Razdrogina	Russia	2:36:54
12	Michaela Kawohl	Germany	2:37:35
13	Zofia Wieciorkowska	Poland	2:41:22
14	Luciene Soares de Deus	Brazil	2:42:12
15	Gillian Horovitz	United Kingdom	2:43:20
16	Hilde Hovdenak	Norway	2:44:47
17	Eriko Asai	Japan	2:45:39
18	Marion Millward	New Zealand	2:49:51
19	Kimberly Griffin	United States	2:50:25
20	Dorthe Rasmussen	Denmark	2:52:01
