= 1991 New York City Marathon =

Footrace held in New York City

22nd New York City Marathon
- Venue: New York City, New York
- Date: November 3

Champions
- Men: Salvador García (2:09:29)
- Women: Liz McColgan (2:27:32)

The 1991 New York City Marathon was the 22nd running of the annual marathon race in New York City, New York, which took place on Sunday, November 3. The men's elite race was won by Mexico's Salvador García in a time of 2:09:28 hours while the women's race was won by Great Britain's Liz McColgan in 2:27:32.

A total of 25,797 runners finished the race, 20,593 men and 5204 women.

== Results ==
=== Men ===
Position	Athlete	Nationality	Time
1st place, gold medalist(s)	Salvador García	Mexico	2:09:28
2nd place, silver medalist(s)	Andrés Espinosa	Mexico	2:10:00
3rd place, bronze medalist(s)	Ibrahim Hussein	Kenya	2:11:07
4	Peter Maher	Canada	2:11:55
5	Isidro Rico	Mexico	2:11:58
6	Rex Wilson	New Zealand	2:12:04
7	Daniel Böltz	Switzerland	2:14:38
8	Jean-Baptiste Protais	France	2:14:54
9	John Treacy	Ireland	2:15:09
10	Peter Renner	New Zealand	2:15:45
11	Fedor Ryzhov	Soviet Union	2:15:47
12	Vadim Sidorov	Soviet Union	2:17:04
13	Juma Ikangaa	Tanzania	2:17:19
14	Rolando Vera	Ecuador	2:17:21
15	John Halvorsen	Norway	2:17:47
16	Marti ten Kate	Netherlands	2:18:18
17	Pierre Lévisse	France	2:18:25
18	John Burra	Tanzania	2:18:58
19	Celso Allembrant	Brazil	2:19:15
20	Johan-Olof Engholm	Sweden	2:19:42
—	Andrew Masai	Kenya	DNF
—	Gerard Nijboer	Netherlands	DNF
—	Pedro Ortiz	Colombia	DNF

=== Women ===
Position	Athlete	Nationality	Time
1st place, gold medalist(s)	Liz McColgan	United Kingdom	2:27:32
2nd place, silver medalist(s)	Olga Markova	Soviet Union	2:28:27
3rd place, bronze medalist(s)	Lisa Ondieki	Australia	2:29:02
4	Alena Peterková	Czechoslovakia	2:30:36
5	Ramilya Burangulova	Soviet Union	2:31:55
6	Joan Samuelson	United States	2:33:48
7	Yelena Semyonova	Soviet Union	2:36:54
8	Elena Murgoci	Romania	2:39:49
9	Graziella Striuli	Italy	2:40:15
10	Carmem de Oliveira	Brazil	2:41:06
11	Gillian Horovitz	United Kingdom	2:41:14
12	Maryse Le Gallo	France	2:44:42
13	Gillian Beschloss	United Kingdom	2:48:02
14	Melinda Ireland	United States	2:48:28
15	Maribel Durruty	Cuba	2:49:47
16	Kathleen Amato	United States	2:50:31
17	Jean Chodnicki	United States	2:52:09
19	Elena Cobos	Spain	2:53:04
20	Raisa Smekhnova	Soviet Union	2:53:19
