= 1975 New York City Marathon =

Footrace held in New York City

- Date: 28 September
- Location: (United States) New York City, NY
- Event type: Marathon
- Distance: 42.195 km
- Edition: 6th
- Course records: 2:19:27 (1975 men); 2:46:14 (1975 women)
- Website: Official website

The 1975 New York City Marathon was the 6th edition of the New York City Marathon and took place in New York City on 28 September.

== Results ==
=== Men ===
Rank	Athlete	Country	Time
1	Tom Fleming	United States	2:19:27
2	William Bragg	United States	2:25:20
3	Tim Smith	United States	2:26:03
4	Max White	United States	2:28:38
5	Mike Baxter	United States	2:28:40
6	Art III Hall	United States	2:28:52
7	Larry Fredrick	United States	2:29:46
8	Mike Konig	United States	2:30:24
9	Rory Suomi	United States	2:33:06
10	Sheldon Karlin	United States	2:33:27

=== Women ===
Rank	Athlete	Country	Time
1	Kim Merritt	United States	2:46:14
2	Miki Gorman	United States	2:53:02
3	Gayle Barron	United States	2:57:22
4	Joan Ullyot	United States	2:58:30
5	Marilyn Bevans	United States	2:59:19
6	Diane Barrett	United States	3:01:41
7	Kathrine Switzer	United States	3:02:57
8	Nancy Linday	United States	3:06:53
9	Susan Mallery	United States	3:07:27
10	Marian May	United States	3:12:01
