= 2006 New York City Marathon =

Footrace held in New York City

37th New York City Marathon
- Venue: New York City, New York
- Date: November 5

Champions
- Men: Marílson Gomes dos Santos (2:09:58)
- Women: Jeļena Prokopčuka (2:25:05)
- Wheelchair men: Kurt Fearnley (1:29:22)
- Wheelchair women: Amanda McGrory (1:54:17)

The 2006 New York City Marathon was the 37th running of the annual marathon race in New York City, New York, which took place on Sunday, November 5. The men's elite race was won by Brazil's Marílson Gomes dos Santos in a time of 2:09:58 hours while the women's race was won by Latvia's Jeļena Prokopčuka in 2:25:05.

In the wheelchair races, Australia's Kurt Fearnley (1:29:22) and America's Amanda McGrory (1:54:17) won the men's and women's divisions, respectively. In the handcycle race, Lebanon's Edward Maalouf (1:25:36) and Monique van der Vorst (1:35:48) were the winners.

A total of 37,936 runners finished the race, 25,607 men and 12,329 women.

== Results ==
=== Men ===
Position	Athlete	Nationality	Time
1st place, gold medalist(s)	Marílson Gomes dos Santos	Brazil	2:09:58
2nd place, silver medalist(s)	Stephen Kiogora	Kenya	2:10:06
3rd place, bronze medalist(s)	Paul Tergat	Kenya	2:10:10
4	Daniel Yego	Kenya	2:10:34
5	Rodgers Rop	Kenya	2:11:24
6	Stefano Baldini	Italy	2:11:33
7	William Kipsang	Kenya	2:11:54
8	Hailu Negussie	Ethiopia	2:12:12
9	Hendrick Ramaala	South Africa	2:13:04
10	Peter Gilmore	United States	2:13:13
11	Dathan Ritzenhein	United States	2:14:01
12	Tom Nyariki	Kenya	2:15:58
13	Elias Kemboi	Kenya	2:16:33
14	Simon Wangai	Kenya	2:16:59
15	Francisco Bautista	Mexico	2:17:30
16	Joe Driscoll	United States	2:18:40
17	Kassahun Kabiso	Ethiopia	2:19:04
18	Andrew Letherby	Australia	2:19:53
19	Matthew Gabrielson	United States	2:19:53
20	Meb Keflezighi	United States	2:22:02
—	Rachid Ghanmouni	Morocco	DQ
—	Joseph Kariuki	Kenya	DNF
—	Julius Kibet	Kenya	DNF
—	Titus Munji	Kenya	DNF
—	Raymond Kipkoech	Kenya	DNF
—	Alan Culpepper	United States	DNF
—	Daniel Cheribo	Kenya	DNF
—	Bolota Asmerom	United States	DNF
—	Pablo Olmedo	Mexico	DNF
—	Bret Schoolmeester	United States	DNF
—	Linus Maiyo	Kenya	DNF

- Rachid Ghanmouni of Morocco originally finished in place in a time of hours, but was retrospectively disqualified for doping.

=== Women ===
Position	Athlete	Nationality	Time
1st place, gold medalist(s)	Jeļena Prokopčuka	Latvia	2:25:05
2nd place, silver medalist(s)	Tetyana Hladyr	Ukraine	2:26:05
3rd place, bronze medalist(s)	Catherine Ndereba	Kenya	2:26:58
4	Rita Jeptoo	Kenya	2:26:59
5	Lidiya Grigoryeva	Russia	2:27:21
6	Deena Kastor	United States	2:27:54
7	Nina Rillstone	New Zealand	2:31:19
8	Lornah Kiplagat	Netherlands	2:32:31
9	Katie McGregor	United States	2:32:36
10	Susan Chepkemei	Kenya	2:32:45
11	Sylvia Skvortsova	Russia	2:33:17
12	Samia Akbar	United States	2:34:14
13	Claudia-Mariela Nero	Argentina	2:35:04
14	Sonia O'Sullivan†	Ireland	2:42:05
15	Magdalena Boulet	United States	2:42:38
16	Viktoriya Ganushina	Ukraine	2:42:50
17	Michelle LaFleur	United States	2:44:09
18	Leteyesus Berhe	Ethiopia	2:45:05
19	Nathalie Vasseur	France	2:45:15
20	Nikole Johns	United States	2:45:58
—	Elena Plastinina	Ukraine	DNF
—	Luminița Talpoș	Romania	DNF
—	Amy Rudolph	United States	DNF

- † Ran in mass race

=== Wheelchair men ===
Position	Athlete	Nationality	Time
1st place, gold medalist(s)	Kurt Fearnley	Australia	1:29:22
2nd place, silver medalist(s)	Aarón Gordian	Mexico	1:35:30
3rd place, bronze medalist(s)	Saúl Mendoza	United States	1:37:42
4	Ernst van Dyk	South Africa	1:38:15
5	Jordi Madera Jimenez	Spain	1:40:48
6	Éric Teurnier	France	1:40:49
7	Jacob Heilveil	United States	1:40:49
8	Denis Lemeunier	France	1:40:50
9	Tyler Byers	United States	1:42:23
10	Rafael Botello	Spain	1:43:38

=== Wheelchair women ===
Position	Athlete	Nationality	Time
1st place, gold medalist(s)	Amanda McGrory	United States	1:54:17
2nd place, silver medalist(s)	Shelly Woods	United Kingdom	1:54:19
3rd place, bronze medalist(s)	Diane Roy	Canada	1:54:38
4	Chantal Petitclerc	Canada	1:56:16
5	Sandra Graf	Switzerland	1:56:29
6	Christina Ripp	United States	1:57:14
7	Miriam Ladner	United States	2:07:45
8	Shirley Reilly	United States	2:10:09
9	April Coughlin	United States	2:29:55
10	Pia Jakobsen	Norway	3:36:03

=== Handcycle men ===
Position	Athlete	Nationality	Time
1st place, gold medalist(s)	Edward Maalouf	Lebanon	1:25:36
2nd place, silver medalist(s)	Vittorio Podestà	Italy	1:27:03
3rd place, bronze medalist(s)	Todd Philpott	United States	1:29:07
4	Theo Geeve	Canada	1:31:43
5	Bogdan Krol	Poland	1:31:45

=== Handcycle women ===
Position	Athlete	Nationality	Time
1st place, gold medalist(s)	Monique van der Vorst	Netherlands	1:35:48
2nd place, silver medalist(s)	Monika Pudlis	Poland	1:53:54
3rd place, bronze medalist(s)	Minda Dentler	United States	2:25:15
4	Jacqui Kapinowski	United States	2:28:49
5	Melynda Schnee	Trinidad and Tobago	2:31:27
