= 2002 New York City Marathon =

Footrace held in New York City

33rd New York City Marathon
- Location: New York City, New York
- Date: November 3

Champions
- Men: Rodgers Rop (2:08:07)
- Women: Joyce Chepchumba (2:25:56)
- Wheelchair men: Krige Schabort (1:38:27)
- Wheelchair women: Cheri Blauwet (2:14:39)

The 2002 New York City Marathon was the 33rd running of the annual marathon race in New York City, New York, which took place on Sunday, November 3. The men's elite race was won by Kenya's Rodgers Rop in a time of 2:08:07 hours while the women's race was won in 2:25:56 by Joyce Chepchumba, also of Kenya.

This was the first time in Marathon history that three men from Kenya placed first, second, and third in a marathon. This also was the first time a man and woman from Kenya won the men's and women's race in a marathon as well.

In the wheelchair races, Americans Krige Schabort (1:38:27) and Cheri Blauwet (2:14:39) won the men's and women's divisions, respectively. In the handcycle race, Switzerland's Franz Nietlispach (1:26:57) and America's Helene Hines (1:59:26) were the winners.

A total of 31,824 runners finished the race, 21,634 men and 10,190 women.

== Results ==
=== Men ===
Position	Athlete	Nationality	Time
1st place, gold medalist(s)	Rodgers Rop	Kenya	2:08:07
2nd place, silver medalist(s)	Christopher Cheboiboch	Kenya	2:08:17
3rd place, bronze medalist(s)	Laban Kipkemboi	Kenya	2:08:39
4	Mohamed Ouaadi	France	2:08:53
5	Stefano Baldini	Italy	2:09:12
6	Mark Carroll	Ireland	2:10:54
7	Gert Thys	South Africa	2:11:48
8	Matt O'Dowd	United Kingdom	2:12:20
9	Meb Keflezighi	United States	2:12:35
10	Stephen Ndungu	Kenya	2:13:28
11	Jeff Schiebler	Canada	2:14:13
12	Wilson Musto	Kenya	2:15:45
13	Matteo Palumbo	Italy	2:16:06
14	Hendrick Ramaala	South Africa	2:17:10
15	Mitsunori Hirayama	Japan	2:17:14
16	Gabriel Muchiri	Kenya	2:17:30
17	David Ruto	Kenya	2:18:43
18	Fedor Ryzhov	Russia	2:18:46
19	Japhet Kosgei	Kenya	2:18:55
20	Henry Tarus	Kenya	2:19:40
—	Tesfaye Jifar	Ethiopia	DNF
—	Jon Brown	United Kingdom	DNF
—	Shaun Creighton	Australia	DNF
—	Sreten Ninković	Serbia	DNF
—	Shem Kororia	Kenya	DNF
—	Scott Larson	United States	DNF
—	Robert Kiprotich Cheruiyot	Kenya	DNF
—	Joseph Kariuki	Kenya	DNF
—	Matt Downin	United States	DNF
—	Godfrey Kiprotich	Kenya	DNF
—	Jacob Losian	Kenya	DNF

=== Women ===
Position	Athlete	Nationality	Time
1st place, gold medalist(s)	Joyce Chepchumba	Kenya	2:25:56
2nd place, silver medalist(s)	Lyubov Denisova	Russia	2:26:17
3rd place, bronze medalist(s)	Esther Kiplagat	Kenya	2:27:00
4	Marla Runyan	United States	2:27:10
5	Margaret Okayo	Kenya	2:27:46
6	Kerryn McCann	Australia	2:27:51
7	Lornah Kiplagat	Kenya	2:28:41
8	Lyudmila Petrova	Russia	2:29:00
9	Milena Glusac	United States	2:31:14
10	Zinaida Semenova	Russia	2:31:39
11	Sonia O'Sullivan	Ireland	2:32:06
12	Sylvia Mosqueda	United States	2:33:47
13	Kimberly Fitchen	United States	2:38:05
14	Carol Howe	Canada	2:38:37
15	Faustina-Maria Ramos	Spain	2:39:40
16	Shelly Steely	United States	2:44:51
17	Janina Malska	Poland	2:45:42
18	Makiko Hotta	Japan	2:46:50
19	Maura Danahy	United States	2:47:37
20	Emily LeVan	United States	2:48:58
—	Olivera Jevtić	Yugoslavia	DQ
—	Maria Guida	Italy	DNF
—	Jane Salumäe	Estonia	DNF
—	Lyudmila Biktasheva	Russia	DNF
—	Sylvia Skvortsova	Russia	DNF

- Olivera Jevtić of Serbia originally finished in third place in a time of 2:26:44 hours but was later disqualified after testing positive for ephedrine, a banned stimulant.

=== Wheelchair men ===
Position	Athlete	Nationality	Time
1st place, gold medalist(s)	Krige Schabort	United States	1:38:27
2nd place, silver medalist(s)	Ernst van Dyk	South Africa	1:45:16
3rd place, bronze medalist(s)	Paul Nunnari	Australia	1:51:46
4	Saúl Mendoza	United States	1:52:48
5	Tyler Byers	United States	1:53:36
6	Antonio Nogueira	United States	1:59:17
7	Kamel Ayari	Tunisia	2:06:21
8	Patrick Doak	United States	2:07:10
9	Chad Johnson	United States	2:12:32
10	Carlos Roberto Oliveira	Brazil	2:17:18

=== Wheelchair women ===
Position	Athlete	Nationality	Time
1st place, gold medalist(s)	Cheri Blauwet	United States	2:14:39
2nd place, silver medalist(s)	Francesca Porcellato	Italy	2:27:08
3rd place, bronze medalist(s)	Michelle Lewis	United Kingdom	3:17:27
4	Christy Campbell	Canada	3:37:15
5	Corre Meyer	United States	5:58:56
6	Sister Mary Gladys	United States	6:11:35
7	Coleen Morrison	Jamaica	6:15:13

=== Handcycle men ===
Position	Athlete	Nationality	Time
1st place, gold medalist(s)	Franz Nietlispach	Switzerland	1:26:57
2nd place, silver medalist(s)	Carlos Moleda	United States	1:33:02
3rd place, bronze medalist(s)	Todd Philpott	Australia	1:38:16
4	Bogdan Krol	Poland	1:38:28
5	Matthew Updike	United States	1:41:12

=== Handcycle women ===
Position	Athlete	Nationality	Time
1st place, gold medalist(s)	Helene Hines	United States	1:59:26
2nd place, silver medalist(s)	Kirsty Digger	United States	2:13:22
3rd place, bronze medalist(s)	Graziella Calimero	Italy	2:52:11
4	Graciela Ramirez	United States	3:15:52
5	Isabel Bohn	United States	3:23:13

== Introduction of New Age Groups for Time Qualification ==
In 2001, the New York City Marathon expanded its qualifying times for guaranteed entry. The new qualifying times were less strict, and they also included an option for qualifying with a half marathon time. However, the only two age groups were under 40 and masters (40 and over).

In 2002, two new categories were added for "veteran" runners - 50-59 and 60 and over. These new qualifying times effectively expanded access to the race for older runners.

2002 Qualifying Times for Guaranteed Entry to the NYC Marathon
Age	Men's Marathon	Women's Marathon	Men's Half Marathon	Women's Half Marathon
Under 40	2:45:00	3:15:00	1:16:00	1:31:00
40 to 49	3:00:00	3:30:00	1:24:00	1:39:00
50 to 59	3:15:00	3:45:00	1:32:00	1:44:00
60+	3:30:00	4:00:00	1:40:00	1:55:00
