= 1994 Boston Marathon =

Footrace in Boston, Massachusetts, USA

- Venue: Boston, United States
- Dates: April 18

Champions
- Men: Cosmas Ndeti (2:07:15)
- Women: Uta Pippig (2:21:45)

The 1994 Boston Marathon was the 98th running of the annual marathon race in Boston, United States, which was held on April 18. The elite men's race was won by Kenya's Cosmas Ndeti in a time of 2:07:15 hours and the women's race was won by Germany's Uta Pippig in 2:21:45.

== Results ==
=== Men ===
Position	Athlete	Nationality	Time
1st place, gold medalist(s)	Cosmas Ndeti	Kenya	2:07:15
2nd place, silver medalist(s)	Andrés Espinosa	Mexico	2:07:19
3rd place, bronze medalist(s)	Jackson Kipngok	Kenya	2:08:08
4	Hwang Young-cho	South Korea	2:08:09
5	Arturo Barrios	Mexico	2:08:28
6	Boay Akonay	Tanzania	2:08:35
7	Bob Kempainen	United States	2:08:47
8	Luketz Swartbooi	Namibia	2:09:08
9	Sam Nyangincha	Kenya	2:09:15
10	Moses Tanui	Kenya	2:09:40
11	Lee Bong-ju	South Korea	2:09:57
12	Martín Fiz	Spain	2:10:21
13	Luíz Antônio dos Santos	Brazil	2:10:39
14	Lameck Aguta	Kenya	2:11:19
15	Thabiso Moqhali	Lesotho	2:11:40
16	John Kagwe	Kenya	2:11:52
17	Benson Masya	Kenya	2:12:35
18	Ezequiel Bitok	Kenya	2:12:45
19	Carlos Tarazona	Venezuela	2:12:49
20	Keith Brantly	United States	2:13:00
21	Joaquim Pinheiro	Portugal	2:13:12
22	Mark Coogan	United States	2:13:24
23	Sammy Lelei	Kenya	2:13:40
24	Dan Held	United States	2:13:50
25	Zabron Miano	Kenya	2:14:16

=== Women ===
Position	Athlete	Nationality	Time
1st place, gold medalist(s)	Uta Pippig	Germany	2:21:45
2nd place, silver medalist(s)	Valentina Yegorova	Russia	2:23:33
3rd place, bronze medalist(s)	Elana Meyer	South Africa	2:25:15
4	Alena Peterková	Czech Republic	2:25:19
5	Carmem de Oliveira	Brazil	2:27:41
6	Mónica Pont	Spain	2:29:36
7	Martha Tenorio	Ecuador	2:30:12
8	Kim Jones	United States	2:31:46
9	Colleen De Reuck	South Africa	2:31:53
10	Albertina Dias	Portugal	2:33:21
11	Emma Scaunich	Italy	2:33:36
12	Sachiyo Seiyama	Japan	2:35:46
13	Gabrielle O'Rourke	New Zealand	2:36:30
14	Irina Bondarchuk	Russia	2:36:53
15	Mary-Lynn Currier	United States	2:37:01
16	Alina Ivanova	Russia	2:37:15
17	Veronica Kanga	Kenya	2:38:46
18	Laura Edmark	United States	2:39:38
19	Natalya Galushko	Belarus	2:40:09
20	Sonya Betancourt	Mexico	2:40:55
21	María Luisa Muñoz	Spain	2:41:18
22	Kimberly Webb	Canada	2:41:22
23	Suzana Ćirić	Yugoslavia	2:41:46
24	Barbara Acosta	United States	2:43:36
25	Sharlet Gilbert	United States	2:43:46
