= 1970 New York City Marathon =

Footrace held in New York City

- Date: 13 September
- Location: (United States) New York City, NY
- Event type: Marathon
- Distance: 42.195 km
- Edition: 1st
- Course records: 2:31:39 (1970)
- Website: Official website
- Participants: 127 (55 finished)

The 1970 New York City Marathon was the 1st edition of the New York City Marathon and took place in New York City on 13 September.

== Results ==
=== Men ===
| Rank | Athlete | Country | Time |
|---|---|---|---|
| 1 | Gary Muhrcke | United States | 2:31:39 |
| 2 | Tom Fleming | United States | 2:35:44 |
| 3 | Ed Ayres | United States | 2:39:19 |
| 4 | Pat Bastick | United States | 2:44:09 |
| 5 | Ted Corbitt | United States | 2:44:15 |
| 6 | Eric Walther | United States | 2:45:38 |
| 7 | Tom Hollander | United States | 2:48:35 |
| 8 | Moses Mayfield | United States | 2:49:50 |
| 9 | Glen Ayres | United States | 2:51:04 |
| 10 | William Kinsella | United States | 2:52:59 |
