= 1989 New York City Marathon =

Footrace held in New York City

20th New York City Marathon
- Venue: New York City, New York
- Date: November 5

Champions
- Men: Juma Ikangaa (2:08:01)
- Women: Ingrid Kristiansen (2:25:30)

The 1989 New York City Marathon was the 20th running of the annual marathon race in New York City, New York, which took place on Sunday, November 5. The men's elite race was won by Tanzania's Juma Ikangaa in a time of 2:08:01 hours while the women's race was won by Norway's Ingrid Kristiansen in 2:25:30.

A total of 24,659 runners finished the race, 19,971 men and 4688 women.

Firefighter Orio Palmer, who died on September 11, 2001 in the World Trade Center, took part in this marathon for the first time.

== Results ==
=== Men ===
Position	Athlete	Nationality	Time
1st place, gold medalist(s)	Juma Ikangaa	Tanzania	2:08:01
2nd place, silver medalist(s)	Ken Martin	United States	2:09:38
3rd place, bronze medalist(s)	Gelindo Bordin	Italy	2:09:40
4	Salvatore Bettiol	Italy	2:10:08
5	Jesús Herrera	Mexico	2:11:15
6	Nivaldo Filho	Brazil	2:12:23
7	Osmiro Silva	Brazil	2:12:50
8	Steve Jones	United Kingdom	2:12:58
9	Belayneh Dinsamo	Ethiopia	2:13:42
10	Pat Petersen	United States	2:14:02
11	Gianni Truschi	Italy	2:14:16
12	Rustam Shagiev	Soviet Union	2:14:39
13	Art Boileau	Canada	2:14:48
14	Gianni Poli	Italy	2:15:47
15	John Campbell	New Zealand	2:16:15
16	Ernest Tjela	South Africa	2:16:19
17	Yevgeniy Okorokov	Soviet Union	2:16:25
18	Kenichi Tsurusaki	Japan	2:16:35
19	Karel David	Czechoslovakia	2:17:00
20	Michel Constant	France	2:17:03
—	Marcus Nenow	United States	DNF
—	Mark Plaatjes	South Africa	DNF
—	Joseph Nzau	Kenya	DNF
—	Salvador García	Mexico	DNF
—	Walter Durbano	Italy	DNF

=== Women ===
Position	Athlete	Nationality	Time
1st place, gold medalist(s)	Ingrid Kristiansen	Norway	2:25:30
2nd place, silver medalist(s)	Kim Jones	United States	2:27:54
3rd place, bronze medalist(s)	Laura Fogli	Italy	2:28:43
4	Kumi Araki	Japan	2:30:00
5	Dorthe Rasmussen	Denmark	2:32:18
6	Zoya Ivanova	Soviet Union	2:32:21
7	Emma Scaunich	Italy	2:32:25
8	Gordon Bakoulis	United States	2:33:01
9	Ritva Lemettinen	Finland	2:34:00
10	Alena Peterková	Czechoslovakia	2:34:22
11	Ayumi Ishikura	Japan	2:35:20
12	Priscilla Welch	United Kingdom	2:36:15
13	Margaret Groos	United States	2:37:33
14	Lisa Vaill	United States	2:38:27
15	Ellen Rochefort	Canada	2:38:29
16	Gillian Horovitz	United Kingdom	2:39:34
17	Raisa Smekhnova	Soviet Union	2:39:38
18	Alessandra Olivari	Italy	2:41:57
19	Ágnes Sipka	Hungary	2:42:04
20	Czeslawa Mentlewicz	Poland	2:42:19
