= 1977 New York City Marathon =

Footrace held in New York City

- Date: 23 October
- Location: (United States) New York City, NY
- Event type: Marathon
- Distance: 42.195 km
- Edition: 8th
- Course records: 2:10:09 (1976 men); 2:39:11 (1976 women)
- Website: Official website

The 1977 New York City Marathon was the 8th edition of the New York City Marathon and took place in New York City on 23 October.

== Results ==
=== Men ===
Rank	Athlete	Country	Time
1	Bill Rodgers	United States	2:11:28
2	Jerome Drayton	Canada	2:13:52
3	Chris Stewart	United Kingdom	2:13:52
4	Esa Tikkanen	Finland	2:14:32
5	Garry Bjorklund	United States	2:15:16
6	Randy Thomas	United States	2:15:51
7	Fernand Kolbeck	France	2:16:25
8	Kenny Moore	United States	2:16:28
9	Kazimierz Orzel	Poland	2:16:48
10	Don Kardong	United States	2:17:04

=== Women ===
Rank	Athlete	Country	Time
1	Miki Gorman	United States	2:43:10
2	Kim Merritt	United States	2:46:03
3	Gayle Barron	United States	2:52:19
4	Lauri Pedrinan	United States	2:52:32
5	Lisa Matovcik	United States	2:55:03
6	Wilma Rudolf	United States	2:56:08
7	Jane Killion	United States	2:56:22
8	Carolyn Ann Billington	United Kingdom	2:58:43
9	Nicki Hobson	United States	3:00:12
10	Gale Jones	United States	3:02:46
