= Zebedayo Bayo =

Tanzanian long-distance runner (born 1976)

Amnaay Zebedayo Bayo (born 20 May 1976 in Arusha) is a Tanzanian long-distance runner who specializes in the marathon.

He won the City-Pier-City Loop half marathon in the Hague in 2000.

== Achievements ==
Year	Competition	Venue	Position	Event	Notes
Representing Tanzania
1997	Ferrara Marathon	Ferrara, Italy	1st	Marathon	2:14:12
1997	Venice Marathon	Venice, Italy	2nd	Marathon	2:12:12
1997	World Championships	Athens, Greece	68th	Marathon	3:11:19
1998	New York City Marathon	New York, United States	3rd	Marathon	2:08:51
1998	Los Angeles Marathon	Los Angeles, United States	1st	Marathon	2:11:21
1999	Paris Marathon	Paris, France	10th	Marathon	2:11:17
1999	World Championships	Seville, Spain	—	Marathon	DNF
2000	World Cross Country Championships	Vilamoura, Portugal	14th	Long race	36:15
2000	Paris Half Marathon	Paris, France	1st	Half marathon	1:00:50
2000	City-Pier-City Loop	The Hague, Netherlands	1st	Half marathon	1:01:07
2000	Paris Marathon	Paris, France	4th	Marathon	2:09:18
2000	Olympic Games	Sydney, Australia	61st	Marathon	2:26:24
2000	World Half Marathon Championships	Veracruz, Mexico	7th	Half marathon	1:04:25
2001	Tokyo Marathon	Tokyo, Japan	4th	Marathon	2:11:12
2001	Hokkaido Marathon	Sapporo, Japan	2nd	Marathon	2:14:49
2002	Lake Biwa Marathon	Ōtsu, Japan	17th	Marathon	2:13:56
2003	Tokyo Marathon	Tokyo, Japan	1st	Marathon	2:09:07
2003	Paris Marathon	Paris, France	8th	Marathon	2:08:54
2003	World Championships	Paris, France	—	Marathon	DNF
2003	Athens Classic Marathon	Athens, Greece	1st	Marathon	2:16:59
2004	Rotterdam Marathon	Rotterdam, Netherlands	8th	Marathon	2:12:23
2004	Olympic Games	Athens, Greece	—	Marathon	DNF
2005	Tokyo Marathon	Tokyo, Japan	2nd	Marathon	2:10:51
2005	Seoul Marathon	Seoul, South Korea	7th	Marathon	2:13:29

=== Personal bests ===
- 10,000 metres - 28:21.60 min (2000)
- Half marathon - 1:00:50 hrs (2000)
- Marathon - 2:08:51 hrs (1998)
