= 1973 New York City Marathon =

Footrace held in New York City

- Date: 4 September
- Location: (United States) New York City, NY
- Event type: Marathon
- Distance: 42.195 km
- Edition: 4th
- Course records: 2:21:54 (1973 men); 2:55:22 (1971 women)
- Website: Official website

The 1973 New York City Marathon was the 4th edition of the New York City Marathon and took place in New York City on 4 September.

== Results ==
=== Men ===
Rank	Athlete	Country	Time
1	Tom Fleming	United States	2:21:54
2	Norbert Sander	United States	2:23:38
3	William Bragg	United States	2:26:33
4	Arthur Hall	United States	2:27:26
5	Hector Oritz	United States	2:29:02
6	Hugh Sweeny	United States	2:29:14
7	Art Moore	United States	2:31:08
8	Calvin Hansey	United States	2:32:01
9	Michael Baxter	United States	2:32:06
10	Pat Bastick	United States	2:32:31

=== Women ===
Rank	Athlete	Country	Time
1	Nina Kuscsik	United States	2:57:07
2	Kathrine Switzer	United States	3:16:02
3	Lynn Blackstone	United States	3:55:43
4	Toby Lenner	United States	4:23:37
