= 1974 New York City Marathon =

Footrace held in New York City

- Date: 29 September
- Location: (United States) New York City, NY
- Event type: Marathon
- Distance: 42.195 km
- Edition: 5th
- Course records: 2:21:54 (1973 men); 2:55:22 (1971 women)
- Website: Official website

The 1974 New York City Marathon was the 5th edition of the New York City Marathon and took place in New York City on 29 September.

== Results ==
=== Men ===
Rank	Athlete	Country	Time
1	Norbert Sander	United States	2:26:30
2	Art McAndrews	United States	2:28:16
3	Larry Frederick	United States	2:32:18
4	Arthur Hall	United States	2:35:01
5	Bill Rodgers	United States	2:35:59
6	Hugh Sweeny	United States	2:37:27
7	Michael Baxter	United States	2:37:31
8	Mike Scarbrough	United States	2:41:00
9	Kevin McDonald	United States	2:44:29
10	Colin Beer	United States	2:45:10

=== Women ===
Rank	Athlete	Country	Time
1	Kathrine Switzer	United States	3:07:29
2	Elizabeth Franceschini	United States	3:36:18
3	Faith Berriman	United States	3:55:06
4	Ann Degroff	United States	3:55:49
5	Durhane Rieger	United States	4:03:17
6	Mary Ann Pepan	United States	4:21:00
7	Betty Phillips	United States	4:27:48
8	Cheryl Weill	United States	4:29:37
9	Mary Hart	United States	5:18:17
