= Kim Jones (runner) =

American runner

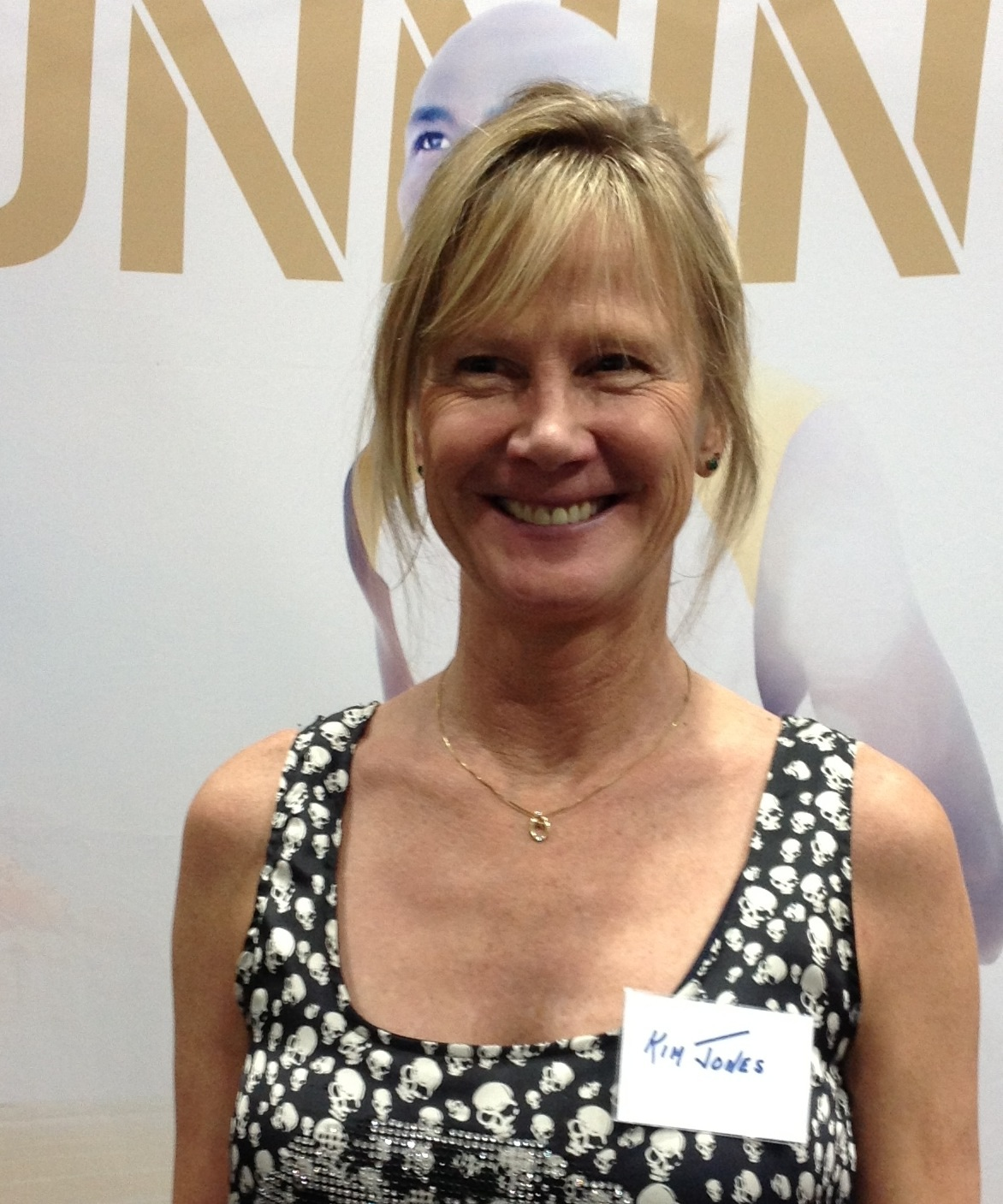

Personal information
- Nationality: American
- Born: May 2, 1958 (age 68) Sonoma, California
- Website: anaerobic.net

Sport
- Country: USA
- Sport: Road Racing
- Event: Marathon
- Coached by: Coached by Benji Durden, US Olympian (1980, Marathon)

Achievements and titles
- Personal bests: 10 K: 32:23 (1989) Half Marathon: 1:11:34 (1988); 30 K: 1:47:41 (1986) Marathon: 2:26:40 (1991)

Kim Jones (born May 2, 1958) is a retired American marathoner and road runner, and author of the autobiography, Dandelion Growing Wild.

== Early life and education ==
Kim Jones was born on May 2, 1958, in Sonoma, California. She had a successful high school running career, winning states titles in the 400 meters, 800 meters, and mile.

== Distance running career ==
Jones became a marathoner after seeing Joan Samuelson's victory in the first women's Olympic marathon. She ran her first marathon in 1984, finishing with a time of 2:48:48. She soon began working with coach Benji Durden, himself an elite marathoner, and posted a second-place finish at the 1985 Twin Cities Marathon, with a time of 2:35:59. Jones competed in the marathon at the 1987 World Championships, but she did not finish after hurting her ankle. In 1988, she finished 5th in the Olympic Marathon Trials with a time of 2:32:16. At the 1991 Berlin Marathon, she ran her lifetime best of 2:26:40 while finishing second. Her time in Berlin made Jones the third-fastest woman marathoner for 1991.

Given her performances in 1991, Jones was among the favorites to qualify for the 1992 US Olympic team and, perhaps, even compete for a medal at the Olympics. Jones injured her ankle, however, only weeks before the Olympic Marathon Trials, and despite continuing her training, she earned a "Did not finish" result in the race. Later that year, at the New York City Marathon, Jones was again unable to complete the race, this time dropping out after 17 miles due to breathing problems. Following the marathon, she suffered from bronchitis and was bedridden for a month while recovering from her illness.

She competed in the World Championships marathon again at the 1993 meet. Because of a slow pace early in the race, Jones led the pack from the 5K mark through the first thirty kilometers. At this point, she began to fall back, explaining later that she "got real mad" and "wasted energy" after contact with another runner. She finished the race in 8th place with a time of 2:36:33. Two years later, she again competed at the World Championships in the marathon, this time finishing 16th with a time of 2:37:06. In February 1996, she tried for the third time to qualify for the Olympics in the marathon, but she failed to complete the race due to illness. Then, in June, she ran the 5000 meters at the Olympic Trials, a distance she had not previously run competitively. She told Runner's World that because her "breathing problems don't usually start for 15 minutes or so," she would be able to complete the race before her asthma began bothering her. At the Trials, she finished 7th with a time of 15:53.58.

=== Marathon performances ===
Year	Marathon	Time	Place
1984	Honolulu Marathon	2:48:48	5th
1985	Twin Cities Marathon	2:35:58	2nd
1986	Twin Cities Marathon	2:32:31	1st
1987	Twin Cities Marathon	2:35:42	2nd
1988	Pittsburgh Marathon	2:32:15	5th
1988	Chicago Marathon	2:32:03	5th
1989	Houston Marathon	2:32:32	2nd
1989	Boston Marathon	2:29:34	3rd
1989	Twin Cities Marathon	2:31:42	1st
1989	New York Marathon	2:27:54	2nd
1990	Boston Marathon	2:31:01	5th
1990	New York Marathon	2:30:50	2nd
1991	Boston Marathon	2:26:40	2nd
1991	Berlin Marathon	2:27:50	2nd
1992	Hokkaido Marathon	2:35:46	3rd
1993	Boston Marathon	2:30:00	2nd
1993	1993 World Championships in Athletics	2:36:33	8th
1994	Boston Marathon	2:31:48	8th
1995	London Marathon	2:31:35	6th
1995	1995 World Championships in Athletics	short course	14th
1995	Chicago Marathon	2:31:24	2nd
1996	New York Marathon	2:34:46	4th
1997	Boston Marathon	2:32:52	9th
1997	New York Marathon	2:32:00	6th
1998	Houston Marathon	2:35:44	2nd
1998	Chicago Marathon	2:43:37	16th
2001	New York Marathon	2:51:21	36th

=== Fastest marathon performances ===
Year	Marathon	Time	Place
1991	Boston Marathon	02:26:40	(2nd) 3rd fastest U.S. marathon performer
1991	Berlin Marathon	02:27:50 AM	(2nd)
1989	New York City Marathon	02:27:54 AM	(2nd)
1989	Boston Marathon	02:29:34 AM	(3rd)
1993	Boston Marathon	02:30:00 AM	(2nd)

- Plus 12 other performances under 2:33 since 1986

== Post-competitive career ==
Jones raised her two daughters in Spokane, Washington, and currently resides in Fort Collins, Colorado, with her husband Jon Sinclair. Since retiring from competition in 1998, she has been a coach with Anaerobic Management, an on-line coaching service for distance runners, as well as a speaker at special events, road races and expos.
