= Róbert Štefko =

Slovak-Czech long-distance runner

Personal information
- Nationality: Slovak
- Born: 28 May 1968 (age 58) Košice, Czechoslovakia

Sport
- Sport: Long-distance running
- Event: Marathon

Róbert Štefko (born 28 May 1968) is a Slovak-Czech retired long-distance runner. He finished fourth in the 1994 European Athletics Championships – Men's 10,000 metres in a time of 28:08.02, less than 2 seconds behind the winner Abel Antón of Spain. He competed in the men's marathon at the 2000 Summer Olympics representing Slovakia and the same event at the 2004 Summer Olympics representing the Czech Republic. In April 2004, he became a Czech citizen.

In 1993 he won the Paris Half Marathon in 1:02.42, establishing a course record. In 1999 he won his home-town marathon, the Košice Peace Marathon, in 2:14:10, and ran a time of 2:11:11 in New York City in 1997. His personal best time at that distance is 2:09:53, set at the 1998 London Marathon, which was good for 6th place.
