= Ibrahim Hussein (runner) =

Kenyan long-distance runner

Personal information
- Full name: Ibrahim Kipkemboi Hussein
- Nationality: Kenyan
- Born: 3 June 1958 (age 68) Kapsabet, Rift Valley, Kenya
- Education: University of New Mexico
- Spouse: Zainab Ibrahim

Sport
- Country: Kenya
- Sport: Athletics
- Events: Long-distance running, Marathon
- Retired: yes

Achievements and titles
- Personal best: Marathon: 2:08:14 (Boston 1992)
Medal record
Men's athletics
Representing Kenya
World Marathon Majors
Gold medal – first place	1988 Boston	Marathon
Gold medal – first place	1991 Boston	Marathon
Gold medal – first place	1992 Boston	Marathon
Gold medal – first place	1987 New York City	Marathon
Bronze medal – third place	1991 New York City	Marathon
Marathons
Gold medal – first place	1985 Honolulu	Marathon
Gold medal – first place	1986 Honolulu	Marathon
Gold medal – first place	1987 Honolulu	Marathon
Silver medal – second place	1989 Honolulu	Marathon

Ibrahim Kipkemboi Hussein (born 3 June 1958 in Kapsabet, Rift Valley) is a retired long-distance runner from Kenya, who was a three-time winner of the Boston Marathon in 1988, 1991, and 1992. He was also the first winner from Kenya of the New York City Marathon in 1987, and multiple other marathons in his years. He and his wife Zainab Ibrahim are both alumni at the University of New Mexico in Albuquerque, NM. Ibrahim Hussein is among many athletesion the Hall of Fame in New Mexico. The couple has five children, Hussein Ibrahim, Farida Ibrahim, Hadija Ibrahim, Jamal Ibrahim and Warda Ibrahim.

Ibrahim Hussein was the first Kenyan (and also the first African) to win Boston, setting a world record and having books written on his legacy. Since his 1988 win, the Kenyans have come to dominate Boston, having won the race every year since 1988 with only nine years of exception. The only non-Africans to win Boston since 1988 were South Korean Lee Bong-Ju, Italian Gelindo Bordin, and Japanese Yuki Kawauchi.

He is now retired and owns Amedo Center, which is an apartment complex that comprises a restaurant, pool place and an electronics shop in Eldoret, Kenya, as well as many other properties in Kenya. He also runs a training camp for young Kenyan athletes who are given a chance to race alongside elite athletes. He was the chairman of Athletics Kenya North Rift branch. He now holds one of only nine offices in the world at the Regional Development Center in Nairobi, after John Velzian's retirement. He works as a representative of English-speaking countries in Africa, holding one of the important offices associated with International Association of Athletics Federation (IAAF), which is an athletic federation governing the sport of athletics.

His 1988 win in Boston was a photo finish with Juma Ikangaa. Hussein held off Ikangaa by a mere second. This was the closest Boston Marathon finish ever up until that point. There would be a closer finish in 2000 when Elijah Lagat won. Ikangaa would go on to finish second again in the next two Boston Marathons but would never win it.

He is the older brother of Mbarak Hussein, a naturalized U.S. citizen who is an elite Master's marathoner in his own right and who has two top five finishes himself in Boston (fifth in 2001 and fourth in 2002.)

Hussein is a graduate of St. Patrick's High School (Iten, Kenya) and the University of New Mexico (Albuquerque, New Mexico, USA).

== Achievements ==
Year	Competition	Venue	Position	Event	Notes
Representing Kenya
1985	New York City Marathon	New York, United States	9th	Marathon	2:15:55
1985	Honolulu Marathon	Honolulu, Hawaii	1st	Marathon	2:12:08
1986	New York City Marathon	New York, United States	4th	Marathon	2:12:51
1986	Honolulu Marathon	Honolulu, Hawaii	1st	Marathon	2:11:44
1987	New York City Marathon	New York, United States	1st	Marathon	2:11:01
1987	Honolulu Marathon	Honolulu, Hawaii	1st	Marathon	2:18:26
1988	Boston Marathon	Boston, United States	1st	Marathon	2:08:43
1988	Olympic Games	Seoul, South Korea	—	Marathon	DNF
1989	Boston Marathon	Boston, United States	4th	Marathon	2:12:41
1989	Honolulu Marathon	Honolulu, Hawaii	2nd	Marathon	2:14:02
1990	Commonwealth Games	Auckland, New Zealand	5th	Marathon	2:13:20
1991	Boston Marathon	Boston, United States	1st	Marathon	2:11:06
1991	New York City Marathon	New York City, United States	3rd	Marathon	2:11:07
1992	Boston Marathon	Boston, United States	1st	Marathon	2:08:14
1992	Olympic Games	Barcelona, Spain	37th	Marathon	2:19:49
1992	Fukuoka Marathon	Fukuoka, Japan	13th	Marathon	2:14:50

== See also ==
- List of winners of the Boston Marathon
