= Mohamed Ouaadi =

French long-distance runner

Mohamed Ouaadi (born 1 January 1969 in Tiznit, Morocco) is a retired French long-distance runner who specialized in the marathon.

== Results ==
Year	Competition	Venue	Position	Event	Notes
Representing France
1998	Reims Marathon	Reims, France	1st	Marathon	2:09:54
1999	World Championships	Seville, Spain	23rd	Marathon	2:18:45
2000	Paris Marathon	Paris, France	1st	Marathon	2:08:49
2000	Olympic Games	Sydney	8th	Marathon	2:14:04
2001	Chicago Marathon	Chicago, United States	4th	Marathon	2:09:26
2002	New York City Marathon	New York, United States	4th	Marathon	2:08:53

=== Personal bests ===
- 5000 metres – 13:44.8 minutes (1998)
- 10,000 metres – 28:33.59 minutes (2002)
- Half marathon – 1:02:29 hours (1998)
- Marathon – 2:07:55 hours (1999)
