= 1972 New York City Marathon =

Footrace held in New York City

- Date: 1 October
- Location: (United States) New York City, NY
- Event type: Marathon
- Distance: 42.195 km
- Edition: 3rd
- Course records: 2:22:54 (1971 men); 2:55:22 (1971 women)
- Website: Official website

The 1972 New York City Marathon was the 3rd edition of the New York City Marathon and took place in New York City on 1 October.

A total of 187 marathon runners finished the race, including 185 men and two women.

== Results ==
=== Men ===
Rank	Athlete	Country	Time
1	Robert Karlin	United States	2:27:52
2	Glenn Appell	United States	2:32:51
3	Pat Bastick	United States	2:33:42
4	William Bragg	United States	2:33:55
5	Arthur Hall	United States	2:37:22
6	Augustin Calle	United States	2:39:17
7	Jim Mcdonagh	United States	2:42:34
8	Orlando Martinez	United States	2:42:38
9	David Faherty	United States	2:43:36
10	Charles Collier	United States	2:43:38

=== Women ===
Rank	Athlete	Country	Time
1	Nina Kuscsik	United States	3:08:41
2	Patricia Barrett	United States	3:29:33
