= Miki Gorman =

American marathon runner (1935–2015)

Personal information
- Full name: Michiko Suwa Gorman
- Nationality: American
- Born: August 9, 1935 Qingdao, China
- Died: 19 September 2015 (aged 80) Bellingham, Washington, U.S.

Sport
- Country: United States
- Sport: Track and field athletics
- Event: Marathon
Medal record
Women's athletics
Representing the United States
World Marathon Majors
Gold medal – first place	1974 Boston	Marathon
Silver medal – second place	1976 Boston	Marathon
Gold medal – first place	1976 New York	Marathon
Gold medal – first place	1977 Boston	Marathon
Gold medal – first place	1977 New York	Marathon

Michiko "Miki" Suwa Gorman (August 9, 1935 – September 19, 2015) was an American marathon runner of Japanese ancestry. Gorman did not begin running competitively until she was in her mid-30s, but rapidly emerged as one of the elite marathoning women of the mid-1970s. She is the only woman to win both the Boston and New York City marathons twice and is the first of only two woman runners to win both marathons in the same year.

== Early life ==
Michiko Suwa was born to Japanese parents in Qingdao, China, grew up in Japan's Fukushima Prefecture during the post-war years and moved to the United States in 1964. Shortly after she moved, she married Michael Gorman. At 5'0½" tall and 86 pounds, she took up running while in her early 30s to gain weight. In 1970, as her first event, Michiko (later "Miki" Gorman) ran an indoor 100 mile run in 21:04:00 in Los Angeles, California.

== Career ==
Gorman set an unofficial world's best for the women's marathon of 2:46:36 at the Western Hemisphere Marathon (now the Culver City Marathon) on December 3, 1973, just four years after she started to run. Four months later, in April 1974, she won the Boston Marathon in a course record of 2:47:11. Gorman would also place second at Boston in 1976, and win Boston again in 1977.

Gorman also won the New York City Marathon twice, in 1976 and 1977, at the age of 41 and 42 respectively. Until 2017, when the race was won by Shalane Flanagan, she had been the last American woman to win the New York City Marathon. She set a personal best during her 1976 victory with a time of 2:39:11, then the second fastest women's marathon in history and just a minute off the world record.

Gorman participated in the 1977 World Masters Athletics Championships in Gothenburg, Sweden and in the 1979 World Masters Athletics Championships that were held in Hanover, West Germany. At Gothenburg, she easily won the 40–44 masters division in the 1500 meters, 3000 meters, cross-country, and marathon competitions. Her cross-country and marathon race times were the fastest among women across all age divisions. In Hanover, at the age of 44, she won her division in the 5000 meters, 10000 meters, and marathon races.

In 1978, Gorman set a women's world record in the half-marathon. Frequently injured in subsequent years, Gorman competed sporadically through the years 1978 to 1981. She decided to retire from competitive running in 1982. In Miki Gorman's hometown of Atsugi, Japan, the city named a 10 km in honor of her called the Gorman Cup.

== Recognition ==
Gorman was inducted into both the Road Runners Club of America Hall of Fame and the USATF Masters Hall of Fame, as well as the National Distance Running Hall of Fame. In 1979, the Supersisters trading card set was produced and distributed; one of the cards featured Gorman's name and picture. In 1981, a film called "Little Champion" (known on video in America as My Champion), starring Yoko Shimada and Chris Mitchum and documenting the events of Gorman's life, was released.

== Death ==
Gorman died from cancer at the age of 80 in Bellingham, Washington.

== See also ==
- List of winners of the Boston Marathon
- List of winners of the New York City Marathon

Records
Preceded by (Belgium) Daniele Justin	Women's Half marathon World record holder 19 November 1978 – 10 March 1979	Succeeded by (United States) Ellison Goodall
Preceded by (United States) Cheryl Bridges	Women's Marathon World Record Holder; December 2, 1973 – October 27, 1974	Succeeded by (France) Chantal Langlacé
