= 2008 New York City Marathon =

Footrace held in New York City

39th New York City Marathon
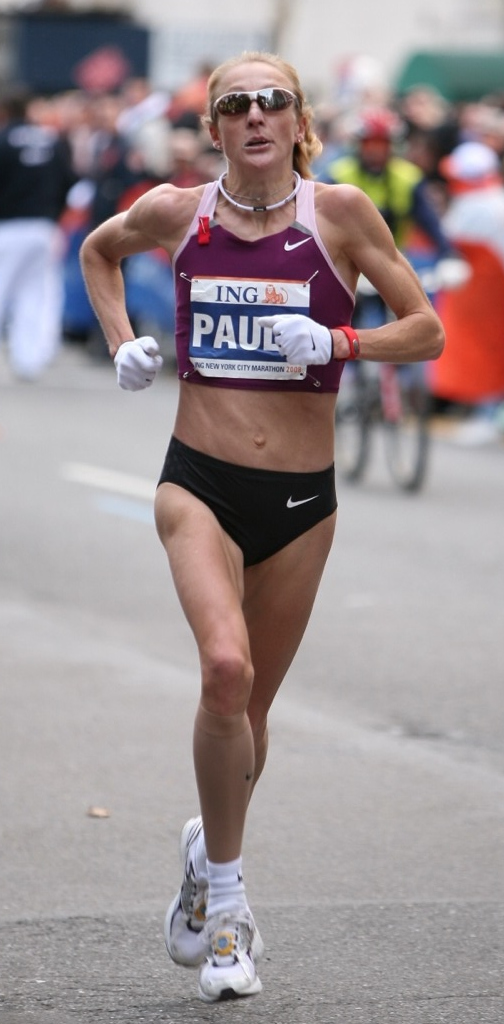
- Paula Radcliffe during the race
- Location: New York City, New York
- Date: November 2

Champions
- Men: Marílson Gomes dos Santos (2:08:43)
- Women: Paula Radcliffe (2:23:56)
- Wheelchair men: Kurt Fearnley (1:44:51)
- Wheelchair women: Edith Hunkeler (2:06:42)

The 2008 New York City Marathon was the 39th running of the annual marathon race in New York City, New York, which took place on Sunday, November 2. The men's elite race was won by Brazil's Marílson Gomes dos Santos in a time of 2:08:43 hours while the women's race was won by Great Britain's Paula Radcliffe in 2:23:56.

In the wheelchair races, Australia's Kurt Fearnley (1:44:51) and Switzerland's Edith Hunkeler (2:06:42) won the men's and women's divisions, respectively. In the handcycle race, Poland's Arkadiusz Skrzypinski (1:35:26) and Dutchwoman Nicole Schefer (1:46:34) were the winners.

A total of 37,790 runners finished the race, 24,991 men and 12,799 women.

== Results ==
=== Men ===
Position	Athlete	Nationality	Time
1st place, gold medalist(s)	Marílson Gomes dos Santos	Brazil	2:08:43
2nd place, silver medalist(s)	Abderrahim Goumri	Morocco	2:09:07
3rd place, bronze medalist(s)	Daniel Rono	Kenya	2:11:22
4	Paul Tergat	Kenya	2:13:10
5	Abderrahime Bouramdane	Morocco	2:13:33
6	Abdihakem Abdirahman	United States	2:14:17
7	Josh Rohatinsky	United States	2:14:23
8	Jason Lehmkuhle	United States	2:14:30
9	Hosea Rotich	Kenya	2:15:26
10	Bolota Asmerom	United States	2:16:37
11	Luke Humphrey	United States	2:18:38
12	Hendrick Ramaala	South Africa	2:19:11
13	Mohammed Awol	Ethiopia	2:19:13
14	Kassahun Kabiso	Ethiopia	2:19:54
15	Jacob Frey	United States	2:20:17
16	Genna Tufa	Ethiopia	2:20:23
18	Teklu Deneke	Ethiopia	2:20:47
19	Boaz Cheboiywo	Kenya	2:21:40
20	Deresse Deniboba	Ethiopia	2:21:54
—	Isaac Macharia	Kenya	DNF
—	Abel Kirui	Kenya	DNF
—	James Carney	United States	DNF
—	Worku Beyi	Ethiopia	DNF
—	Wilfred Kibet Kigen	Kenya	DNF
—	Dereje Hailegeorgis	Ethiopia	DNF

=== Women ===
Position	Athlete	Nationality	Time
1st place, gold medalist(s)	Paula Radcliffe	United Kingdom	2:23:56
2nd place, silver medalist(s)	Lyudmila Petrova	Russia	2:25:43
3rd place, bronze medalist(s)	Kara Goucher	United States	2:25:53
4	Rita Jeptoo	Kenya	2:27:49
5	Catherine Ndereba	Kenya	2:29:14
6	Gete Wami	Ethiopia	2:29:25
7	Dire Tune	Ethiopia	2:29:28
8	Lidia Șimon	Romania	2:30:04
9	Lyubov Morgunova	Russia	2:30:38
10	Katie McGregor	United States	2:31:14
11	Magdalena Boulet	United States	2:33:56
12	Hayley Haining	United Kingdom	2:35:11
13	Lucy MacAlister	United Kingdom	2:39:25
14	Sally Meyerhoff	United States	2:40:57
15	Ilsa Paulson	United States	2:41:17
16	Robyn Friedman	United States	2:41:21
17	Melisa Christian	United States	2:42:33
18	Katarina Janosiková	Slovakia	2:42:57
19	Sopagna Eap	United States	2:43:29
20	Viktoriya Ganushina	Ukraine	2:43:55
—	Kim Smith	New Zealand	DNF
—	Atalelech Ketema	Ethiopia	DNF
—	Catherine Wilding	United Kingdom	DNF
—	Christine Glockenmeier	United States	DNF

=== Wheelchair men ===
Position	Athlete	Nationality	Time
1st place, gold medalist(s)	Kurt Fearnley	Australia	1:44:51
2nd place, silver medalist(s)	Masazumi Soejima	Japan	1:46:10
3rd place, bronze medalist(s)	Aarón Gordian	Colombia	1:46:57
4	Heinz Frei	Switzerland	1:47:33
5	Roger Puigbò	Spain	1:47:37
6	Krige Schabort	United States	1:49:06
7	Marcel Hug	Switzerland	1:49:21
8	Hiroyuki Yamamoto	Japan	1:51:08
9	Denis Lemeunier	France	1:52:11
10	Josh Cassidy	Canada	1:53:09

=== Wheelchair women ===
Position	Athlete	Nationality	Time
1st place, gold medalist(s)	Edith Hunkeler	Switzerland	2:06:42
2nd place, silver medalist(s)	Amanda McGrory	United States	2:11:25
3rd place, bronze medalist(s)	Shelly Woods	United Kingdom	2:16:09
4	Christie Dawes	Australia	2:16:09
5	Diane Roy	Canada	2:16:14
6	Sandra Graf	Switzerland	2:20:34
7	Shirley Reilly	United States	2:22:10
8	Sandra Hager	Switzerland	2:35:39
9	Cristina Sanna	Italy	3:17:12
–	Tatiana Ruleva	Russia	DNF

=== Handcycle men ===
Position	Athlete	Nationality	Time
1st place, gold medalist(s)	Arkadiusz Skrzypinski	Poland	1:35:26
2nd place, silver medalist(s)	Rob Martin	New Zealand	1:37:07
3rd place, bronze medalist(s)	Christopher Ayres	United States	1:38:32
4	Rob Wickham	United Kingdom	1:38:36
5	Keane West	United States	1:41:48

=== Handcycle women ===
Position	Athlete	Nationality	Time
1st place, gold medalist(s)	Nicole Schefer	Netherlands	1:46:34
2nd place, silver medalist(s)	Helene Hines	United States	2:05:21
3rd place, bronze medalist(s)	Kristin Juhasz	United States	2:16:03
4	Minda Dentler	United States	2:25:00
5	Peggy Floback	United States	2:50:34
