= Rodgers Rop =

Kenyan long-distance runner

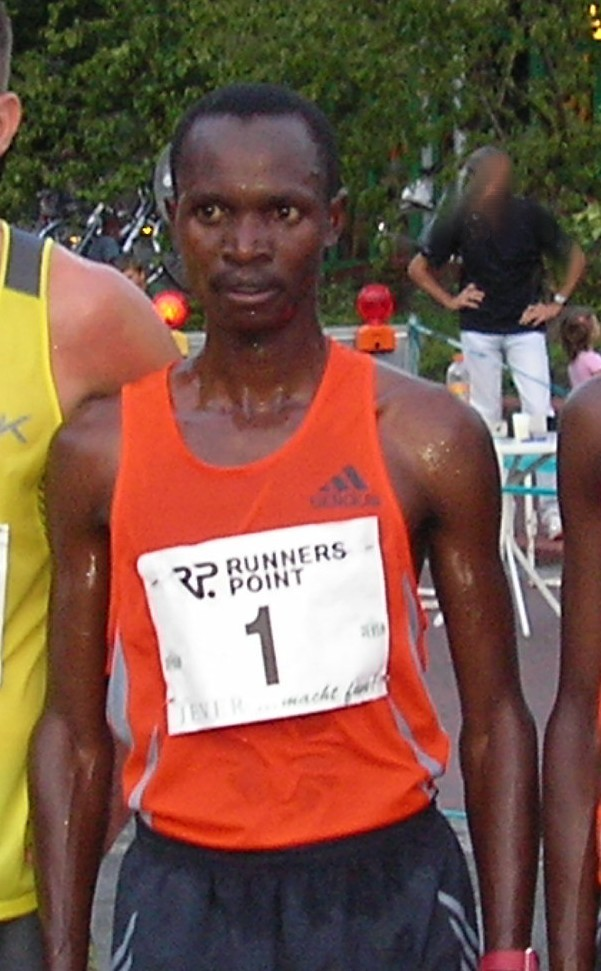
Rodgers Rop 2006 in Schortens

Rodgers Rop (born 16 February 1976) is a long-distance runner from Kenya.

In 2002, Rop won both the Boston Marathon and the New York Marathon. He joined an exclusive club of men who have won both races: Bill Rodgers, Alberto Salazar, Ibrahim Hussein, Joseph Chebet, Meb Keflezighi, and Geoffrey Mutai (see also List of winners of the Boston Marathon and List of winners of the New York City Marathon).

Rop tried to defend his Boston and New York titles in 2003 but finished 7th and 2nd respectively. In 2006 he improved his personal best to 2:07:34, when he finished 6th at the London Marathon.

In 2007 he won the Hamburg Marathon in 2:07:32, one second ahead of Wilfred Kigen, setting again a personal best.

Like many other Kenyan athletes, Rop works as a police officer in the offseason. After winning Boston in 2002, Rop received not only the winner's $80,000 check but also gifts of five sheep and two cows from the people of his native village. He also named his newborn son "Boston".

Rogers Rop comes from Kapsabet, Kenya. He is married and has two children

== Achievements ==
Year	Competition	Venue	Position	Event	Notes
Representing Kenya
2001	New York City Marathon	New York, United States	3rd	Marathon	2:09:51
2002	Boston Marathon	Boston, United States	1st	Marathon	2:09:02
2002	New York City Marathon	New York, United States	1st	Marathon	2:08:07
2004	Lisbon Half Marathon	Lisbon, Portugal	1st	Half marathon	1:02:03
2007	Hamburg Marathon	Hamburg, Germany	1st	Marathon	2:07:32
