= Norbert Sander =

American marathon runner (1942–2017)

Personal information
- Nationality: American
- Born: 21 August 1942 United States
- Died: 17 March 2017 (aged 74)

Sport
- Country: United States
- Sport: Sport of athletics
- Event: Marathon

Achievements and titles
- Personal best: Marathon: 2:23:38 (1972)

Norbert Sander (August 21, 1942 – March 17, 2017) was an American physician and runner who won the New York City Marathon in 1974. He has been described as "one of the most influential track and field figures in the city's history," and is known for his work restoring the Fort Washington Armory.

Sander was born on August 21, 1942 in Yonkers and attended Fordham Prep where he was a member of two title-winning teams and Fordham University where he was a member of a team that set the then Penn Relays record. He graduated from Fordham University in 1964 and the Albert Einstein College of Medicine in 1971.

Sander remains the only male New Yorker to win the New York City Marathon, which he won in 1974 when the course was held in Central Park. Sander had run in the old armory as a child and beginning in 1992, oversaw its restoration and subsequently he became the Armory's President & CEO. In that role, he oversaw the move of the Millrose Games and other marquee track and field events to the building.

Sander was a winner of the Heliodoro and Patricia Rico Lifetime Achievement Award from USA Track & Field in 2000 and the NYRR Abebe Bikila Award in 2014. Posthumously, the Armory named the Sander Invitational in his honor.

Sander died of a heart attack on March 17, 2017.
