= Francisco Bautista =

Mexican long-distance runner

Personal information
- Born: September 17, 1972 (age 53) Contla de Juan Cuamatzi, Tlaxcala, Mexico

Sport
- Sport: Track and field

Francisco Bautista (born September 17, 1972) is a Mexican long-distance runner. He represented his native country at the 2008 Summer Olympics in Beijing, PR China, where he finished in 66th place in the men's marathon event, clocking 2:29.28. Bautista set his personal best (2:11.44) in the marathon on March 7, 2004 in Torreón.

== Achievements ==
| Year | Competition | Venue | Position | Event | Notes |
Representing Mexico
| 2001 | Central American and Caribbean Championships | Guatemala City, Guatemala | 2nd | Half Marathon | |
| 2001 | World Championships | Edmonton, Canada | 45th | Marathon | |
| 2002 | Central American and Caribbean Games | San Salvador, El Salvador | 5th | Marathon | 2:28:09 |
