= Gayle Barron =

American marathon runner

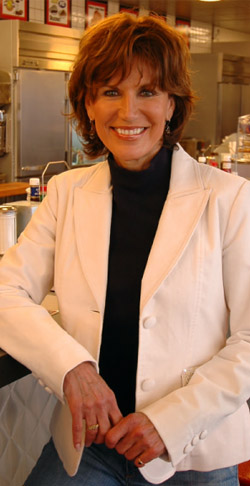

Personal information
- Born: April 6, 1945 (age 80) Atlanta, Georgia
- Occupation: Athlete

Sport
- Country: United States
- Sport: Marathon
- Retired: 1981

Gayle Barron (born 6 April 1945) is an American former marathon runner. From 1970 to 1978, Barron placed in the top five in marathons held across the United States and was the winner of the 1978 Boston Marathon. Barron was inducted into the Georgia Sports Hall of Fame in 2003 and the Atlanta Sports Hall of Fame in 2007.

== Early life and education ==
On 6 April 1945, Barron was born in Atlanta, Georgia. She went to Druid Hills High School before attending the University of Georgia. Barron graduated from the University of Georgia with a degree in journalism.

== Career ==
In the 1960s, Barron began her running distance career in Athens for the Georgia Bulldogs. She entered her first large race in the 1970 Peachtree Road Race. As a co-founder of the Peachtree Road Race, Barron was the top female finisher at Peachtree each year from 1970 to 1975 except for 1972 when she was beaten by Gillian Valk. Barron also won the first three Peach Bowl Marathons held from 1972 to 1975.

In 1974, Barron became a professional runner. As a professional athlete, Barron placed in the top three at the Boston, New York and Honolulu marathons from 1975 to 1977. Barron's final win was at the 1978 Boston Marathon and she continued to run until 1981. After ending her professional running career, Barron began working for an athletic clinic. Outside of marathon running, Barron was a television broadcaster for WAGA-TV in Atlanta and coached a team of runners from the Leukemia Society of America.

== Awards and honors ==
In 2003, Barron was inducted into the Georgia Sports Hall of Fame. In 2007, Barron became a part of the Atlanta Sports Hall of Fame.
