= Gary Muhrcke =

Inaugural New York City Marathon winner

Gary Muhrcke (born c. 1940) is an American runner and former New York City fireman who won the first New York City Marathon in 1970. He also won the first Empire State Building Run-Up in 1978, and was a three-time winner of the Yonkers Marathon.
