= Pedro Ortiz (Colombian athlete) =

Colombian long-distance runner

Personal information
- Nationality: Colombian
- Born: 26 February 1956 (age 70)

Sport
- Sport: Long-distance running
- Event: Marathon

Pedro Ortiz (born 26 February 1956) is a Colombian long-distance runner. He competed in the men's marathon at the 1988 Summer Olympics.
