= John Kagwe =

Kenyan long-distance runner

John Karunga Kagwe (born 9 January 1969) is a Kenyan former long-distance runner who had back-to-back wins at the New York City Marathon from 1997 to 1998. He set his lifetime best of 2:08:12 hours as part of his first victory there. Kagwe's professional road racing career began in 1994 and he continued to compete at a high level until 2006. After he turned forty and entered the veterans category, he returned to running, making some appearances in 2011. He also won the Prague International Marathon and the San Diego Marathon.

== Career ==
A small runner at five foot six inches, Kagwe did not take running seriously until he was 18. He was inspired by the feats of John Ngugi but the strength of athletes in Kenya forced him to try progressively longer distances. He competed mainly in the United States and his first race abroad was the Gasparilla Distance Classic in 1994, later that year he ran at the Boston Marathon and placed sixteenth with 2:11:52 hours. He was runner-up at the Cleveland Marathon a month later. He established himself further with a fourth-place finish at the Philadelphia Distance Run and third at the Twin Cities Marathon later that year. His first marathon win came in 1995, when he took the Pittsburgh Marathon title with a personal record of 2:10:24 hours. A win at the Atlantic City Half Marathon preceded his debut at the New York Marathon in 1995, at which he finished fifth.

A lifetime best of 61:31 minutes in the half marathon came in March 1996 in Lisbon. His only marathon that year was in New York and he came close to his best with 2:10:59 hours. The following year he was victorious at the Fifth Third River Bank Run as well as the Prague International Marathon (his first win in Europe). Among his outings in the United States that year was a runner-up finish at the Philadelphia Distance Run. He had the breakthrough of his career that November, winning the New York City Marathon race. In spite of winning in a quick time of 2:08:12 hours, he was humble upon reflection, stating: "I think I'm maybe the 10th best, maybe the 20th best. I still have to win a couple more big ones to be the best, or maybe run a minute and a half faster and break the world record. I will try.".

Kagwe entered the Boston Marathon in 1998 and was only a little short of his best at 2:08:51 hours, but was down in fifth in the fast-paced race. He was defeated at numerous competitions, only winning a 10K race in Avalon, New Jersey, but on his return to the New York Marathon he lodged a successful defence, winning the race for a second time. He won by a margin of three seconds, ahead of compatriot Joseph Chebet who would himself win the same race a year later.

After his New York wins, he continued to regularly feature at major marathons, but did not come close to winning them. He was fifth in Boston and New York in 1999, then sixth at the Boston race and tenth in New York in 2000. He had a mixed 2001 season: after a lowly 32nd-place finish at the London Marathon he returned to the United States and won both the River Bank Run and Rock 'n' Roll San Diego Marathon. These proved to be his last major wins. He had seventh-place finishes at the 2001 New York Marathon and 2002 Chicago Marathon, as well as several top five finishes in half marathons in the same period. Top ten finishes in New York in 2003 and 2004 were his last high standard performances. His times declined from 2005 onwards and he failed to finish in New York, then scraped the top ten in the lower standard Los Angeles Marathon and Sapporo Marathon in 2006.

== Road race wins ==
- Rock 'n' Roll San Diego Marathon: 2001
- New York City Marathon: 1997, 1998
- Prague International Marathon: 1997
- Pittsburgh Marathon: 1995
- Fifth Third River Bank Run: 1997, 2001
- America's Finest City Half Marathon: 1996

== Personal bests ==
- 10K run – 27:37 min (1995)
- Half marathon – 61:31 min (1996)
- Marathon – 2:08:12 (1997)

== Personal life ==
He is the father of five children, Stephen Karunga, Ephraim Kagwe, Margret Wanjiku, Joseph Mungai and David Chuma.

== See also ==
- List of winners of the New York City Marathon
