= Cheri Blauwet =

American physician and wheelchair racer

Medal record

Women's athletics

Representing the United States

Paralympic Games
Gold medal – first place	2004 Athens	800 m T53
Silver medal – second place	2000 Sydney	100 m T53
Bronze medal – third place	2000 Sydney	200 m T53
Bronze medal – third place	2000 Sydney	400 m T53
Bronze medal – third place	2000 Sydney	800 m T53
Bronze medal – third place	2004 Athens	5000 m T54
Bronze medal – third place	2004 Athens	marathon T54

Cheri Blauwet (born May 15, 1980) is an American physician and Paralympic wheelchair racer. She is Board Certified in Physical Medicine and Rehabilitation (PM&R) and Sports Medicine, is associate professor of PM&R at Harvard Medical School and an attending physician at Brigham and Women's Hospital and Spaulding Rehabilitation Hospital. She has competed at the Paralympic level in events ranging from the 100 meters to the marathon.

In 2023 she became chair of the board of governors of the Boston Athletic Association.She is also the Director of the Kelley Adaptive Sports Research Institute. In 2025, she was also named senior vice president and chief clinical officer for Shirley Ryan AbilityLab.

== Early life and education ==
Blauwet grew up in Larchwood, Iowa, in a farming family. She has used a wheelchair since the age of 18 months, following a farming accident resulting in a spinal cord injury located at the T10 vertebra. She began racing in high school when she was recruited by her school's track and field coach. She later attended the University of Arizona, where she was a member of the school's wheelchair racing team, and graduated magna cum laude with a degree in molecular and cellular biology. She attended Stanford University School of Medicine, completed her residency in physical medicine and rehabilitation at Harvard Medical School, and completed a sports medicine fellowship at Rehabilitation Institute of Chicago. Her inspiration for pursuing medicine was due to her spinal injury, providing her with experience with the healthcare system early on.

== Racing career ==
Blauwet began her sporting career as a wheelchair sprinter, but later focused on longer distances. At the 2000 Summer Paralympics, she won a silver medal in the 100 m and three bronzes in the 200 m, 400 m, and 800 m events. She competed in her first marathon in Japan in 2002, and two weeks later won the New York City race, her second marathon. She then went on to win the New York City Marathon twice (2002, 2003), the Boston Marathon twice (2004, 2005), and the Los Angeles Marathon four times (2003, 2004, 2005, and 2008).

At the 2004 Olympic Games, she finished 5th in the demonstration sport of Women's 800m wheelchair. She also participated in the 2004 Summer Paralympics, where she won gold in the 800 m, bronze in the 5000 m, and another bronze in the marathon. She was also a member of the 2008 USA Paralympic team in Beijing. Blauwet was named a member of the 2002 USA Today All-USA Academic Team and has been nominated for the ESPY Award, the Laureus World Sports Award, and Women's Sports Foundation Athlete of the Year. She was also listed as one of 100 named on forbes "acssesible 100."

== Medical career ==
Blauwet attended Stanford University School of Medicine, graduating in 2009. She completed an internship in internal medicine at Brigham and Women's Hospital in 2010 and a residency in PM&R in 2013 at Spaulding Rehabilitation Hospital/Harvard Medical School, where she served as Chief Resident. She completed a fellowship in sports medicine at the Rehabilitation Institute of Chicago in 2014. She is currently associate professor of PM&R at Harvard Medical School and an Attending Physician at Brigham and Women's Hospital and Spaulding Rehabilitation Hospital, where she specializes in sports medicine.

She has published numerous scientific papers focusing on sports medicine, adaptive sports and exercise, and women in medicine. She was the recipient of the Harold Amos Diversity Award from Harvard Medical School in 2016, which recognized her excellence in promoting research and clinical care for athletes with disabilities as well as promoting opportunities for faculty and trainees with disabilities. She was awarded an Honorary Doctor of Humane Letters degree from Emerson College during their 135th Commencement Ceremony in 2015 and was named by the Boston Chamber of Commerce as one of Boston's Ten Outstanding Young Leaders in 2016.

Blauwet has taken on many leadership and advocacy roles, focusing on promoting physical activity and a healthy lifestyle for individuals with disabilities. She currently serves as Chairperson of the International Paralympic Committee's Medical Commission, is on the board of directors for the United States Olympic Committee as well as the International Olympic Committee Medical and Scientific Commission, and serves as the Disability Access and Awareness Director for Spaulding Rehabilitation Network. She previously served on the board of directors of the United States Anti-Doping Agency, the Neilsen Foundation Quality of Life Grant Review Board, and was a member of the Boston 2024 Olympic Bid Committee. She spoke on the floor of the United Nations in 2015 for the UN International Day of Sport for Development and Peace and was keynote speaker at the Boston celebration of the 25th Anniversary of the Americans with Disabilities Act. She traveled to Ethiopia and Angola in 2006 with the Vietnam Veterans of America Foundation Sports for Life program, where she helped to educate communities on the rights of individuals with disabilities as well as establish sustainable sports programs. She remains an advocate for individuals with disabilities through lectures, interviews and commercials. In 2025, she was named in Forbes' Accessibility 100 as a leader who has significantly impacted global accessibility. She was selected for using her platform and education to increase participation in physical activity for people suffering from disabilities.
