= Tom Fleming (runner) =

American long-distance runner

Thomas J. Fleming (July 23, 1951 – April 19, 2017) was an American distance runner who won the 1973 and 1975 New York City Marathon. He was also a two time runner-up in the Boston Marathon in 1973 and 1974 and finished six times in the top ten in the BAA marathon. Fleming was the winner of the Cleveland, Toronto, Los Angeles, Jersey Shore (3 times) and Washington DC marathons in the 1970s. He set a personal best of 2:12:05 in the Boston Marathon 1975, and was renowned for running 110 to 150 miles per week to train for road racing. He was awarded the United Nations Peace Medal in 1977.

He was quoted as saying "Somewhere, someone in the world is training when you are not. When you race him, he will win."

== Running career ==
Fleming was born in Long Branch, New Jersey. He grew up in Bloomfield, New Jersey and began his life-long interest in running as a student at Bloomfield High School.

A longtime resident of Bloomfield, he was the coach and founder of the three-time USA National Cross Country Champions Nike Running Room in Bloomfield (1990, 1991, 1992).

For 12 years, Fleming was the meet director for the Sunset Classic 5 mile road race in his hometown of Bloomfield. This race raises money for special needs children in the Bloomfield Public Schools. The race was renamed in his memory in 2017 as the Tom Fleming Sunset Classic.

Fleming was a teacher and head coach of the varsity cross country, indoor and outdoor track & field teams at the Montclair Kimberley Academy. On April 19, 2017 Fleming died from a heart attack while coaching a track meet. He was 65.

In May 2013, Fleming was inducted into the American RRCA Distance Running Hall of Fame, and in July 2014, into the National Distance Running Hall of Fame in Utica, New York. In November 2017, Fleming was one of five people inducted by the New York Road Runners into its Hall of Fame.

== Achievements ==
| Year | Competition | Venue | Position | Event | Notes |
Representing the United States
| 1973 | Boston Marathon | Boston, United States | 2nd | Marathon | 2:17:46 |
| 1973 | New York City Marathon | New York, United States | 1st | Marathon | 2:21:54 |
| 1974 | Boston Marathon | Boston, United States | 2nd | Marathon | 2:14:26 |
| 1975 | Boston Marathon | Boston, United States | 3rd | Marathon | 2:12:05 |
| 1975 | New York City Marathon | New York, United States | 1st | Marathon | 2:19:27 |
| 1978 | Cleveland Marathon | Cleveland, United States | 1st | Marathon | 2:15:02 |
| 1981 | Los Angeles Marathon | Los Angeles, United States | 1st | Marathon | 2:13:14 |
