= Gillian Horovitz =

British long-distance runner

Gillian Horovitz née Adams
Personal information
- Nationality: British (English)
- Born: 7 June 1955 (age 70) Bromley, Kent, England
- Spouse: Israel Horovitz
- Children: 2

Sport
- Sport: Athletics
- Event: long distance
- Club: AFD

Gillian Pamela Horovitz (née Adams; born 7 June 1955) is an English female retired long-distance runner. She competed in the late 1970s and early 1980s in the women's marathon.

== Biography ==
In June 1979, Adams finished second behind Joyce Smith at Sandbach in the British national marathon.

Adams won the 1980 Paris Marathon.

Adams married American screenwriter Israel Horovitz, in late 1981 and competed under her married name thereafter. She became the stepmother of Adam Horovitz of the Beastie Boys

Horovitz represented England in the marathon, at the 1998 Commonwealth Games in Kuala Lumpur, Malaysia.

== Achievements ==
Year	Competition	Venue	Position	Event	Notes
Representing United Kingdom and England
1980	Tokyo Marathon	Tokyo, Japan	3rd	Marathon	2:40:53
1980	London Marathon	London, United Kingdom	10th	Marathon	2:42:14
1980	Paris Marathon	Paris, France	1st	Marathon	2:49:42
1980	New York City Marathon	New York City, United States	5th	Marathon	2:37:55
1981	London Marathon	London, United Kingdom	3rd	Marathon	2:40:44
1986	New York City Marathon	New York City, United States	22nd	Marathon	2:46:32
1987	New York City Marathon	New York City, United States	9th	Marathon	2:47:05
1988	New York City Marathon	New York City, United States	13th	Marathon	2:42:18
1998	Commonwealth Games	Kuala Lumpur, Malaysia	4th	Marathon	2:46:58
