= Juma Ikangaa =

Tanzanian long-distance runner (born 1957)

Personal information
- Born: 19 July 1957 (age 69)
Medal record
Men's athletics
Representing Tanzania
African Championships
Gold medal – first place	1982 Cairo	Marathon
Commonwealth Games
Silver medal – second place	1982 Brisbane	Marathon

Juma Ikangaa (born 19 July 1957 in Dodoma) is a former marathon runner from Tanzania, who won the 1989 New York City Marathon in a course-record time of 2:08:01. Ikangaa was also a sentimental favorite in the Boston Marathon after finishing second three years in a row from 1988 to 1990. Famous world-wide along with Bayi and Nyambui as a successful Tanzanian front-runner, "Ikangaa remained synonymous with Tanzania." After retirement from elite competition Ikangaa became a highly respected coach. Ikangaa has emphasized, "The will to win means nothing without the will to prepare."

== International competitions ==
Year	Competition	Venue	Position	Event	Notes
Representing Tanzania
1982	African Championships	Cairo, Egypt	1st	Marathon	2:21:05
1982	Commonwealth Games	Brisbane, Australia	2nd	Marathon	2:09:30
1983	World Championships	Helsinki, Finland	15th	Marathon	2:13:11
1984	Olympic Games	Los Angeles, United States	6th	Marathon	2:11:10
1985	1985 World Marathon Cup	Hiroshima, Japan	10th	Marathon	2:11:06
1987	World Championships	Rome, Italy	6th	Marathon	2:13:43
1988	Olympic Games	Seoul, South Korea	7th	Marathon	2:13:06
1992	Olympic Games	Barcelona, Spain	34th	Marathon	2:19:34
1993	World Championships	Stuttgart, Germany	21st	Marathon	2:24:23
1995	World Championships	Gothenburg, Sweden	43rd	Marathon	2:30:53

== Road races ==
Year	Competition	Venue	Position	Event	Notes
1983	Tokyo Marathon	Tokyo, Japan	5th	Marathon	2:10:54
1983	Melbourne Marathon	Melbourne, Australia	1st	Marathon	2:13:50
1983	Fukuoka Marathon	Fukuoka, Japan	2nd	Marathon	2:08:55
1984	Tokyo Marathon	Tokyo, Japan	1st	Marathon	2:10:49
1984	Melbourne Marathon	Melbourne, Australia	1st	Marathon	2:15:31
1986	Tokyo Marathon	Tokyo, Japan	1st	Marathon	2:08:10
1986	Beijing Marathon	Beijing, China	3rd	Marathon	2:08:39
1986	Fukuoka Marathon	Fukuoka, Japan	1st	Marathon	2:10:06
1987	Beijing Marathon	Beijing, China	1st	Marathon	2:12:19
1988	Tokyo Marathon	Tokyo, Japan	2nd	Marathon	2:08:42
1988	Boston Marathon	Boston, United States	2nd	Marathon	2:08:44
1989	New York City Marathon	New York City, United States	1st	Marathon	2:08:01
1989	Boston Marathon	Boston, United States	2nd	Marathon	2:09:56
1990	Boston Marathon	Boston, United States	2nd	Marathon	2:09:52
1990	New York City Marathon	New York City, United States	4th	Marathon	2:14:32
1992	Boston Marathon	Boston, United States	4th	Marathon	2:11:44
1994	Fukuoka Marathon	Fukuoka, Japan	10th	Marathon	2:13:57
