= List of winners of the Boston Marathon =

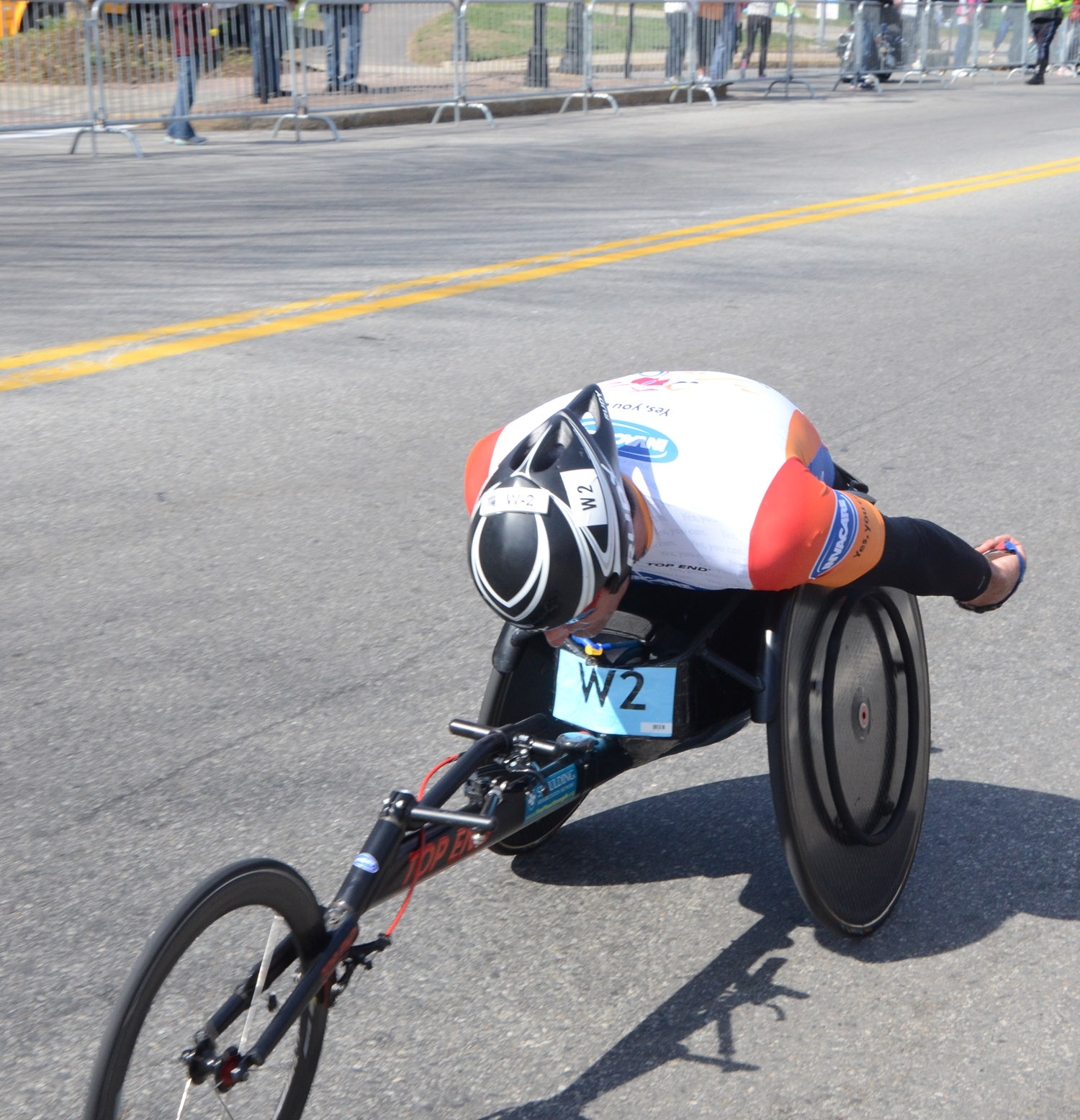
Ernst van Dyk has won the Boston Marathon 10 times, more than any other athlete.

The Boston Marathon, one of six World Marathon Majors, is a 26.2-mile (42.2 km) race which has been held in the Greater Boston area in Massachusetts since 1897, making it the oldest annual marathon in the world. The event is held on Patriots' Day, which was April 19 (or April 20 if April 19 was a Sunday) until the implementation of the Uniform Monday Holiday Act in 1971. Since 1971, except in 2020 (race not held) or 2021 (Columbus Day holiday), the Boston Marathon is held on the third Monday in April. Various factors meant that until 1957 the course varied in length, due to which the marathon recognizes several course records that are slower than previous records due to being run on longer courses. The first Boston Marathon included only 15 runners, all of whom were men, and was won by John McDermott. The race was cancelled twice, in 1918 because of World War I, where a ekiden-style relay was conducted of military teams, and in 2020, when Massachusetts authorities refused to allow the event to be conducted due to the COVID-19 pandemic.

Through the 2025 edition: overall winners (men's open division) have represented 19 countries, with Americans having won the marathon the most, doing so on 43 occasions; Kenyans have won 26 times; and Canadians 16 times. Winners in the women's open division have represented 10 countries: Kenyan women have won 17 races, American women have won 16 times, and Ethiopian women have won 8 times. Ernst van Dyk is the most successful individual athlete, having won the men's wheelchair division 10 times. Course records are held by John Korir (men), Sharon Lokedi (women), Marcel Hug (men's wheelchair), and Manuela Schär (women's wheelchair).

Clarence DeMar won the men's open race seven times, more than any other runner, achieving his first victory in 1911 and his last in 1930. Women were only officially allowed to run the race beginning in 1972, though female runners had unofficially participated beginning in 1966 despite breaching the rules of the Amateur Athletic Union. The first six victories in the women's open division, between 1966 and 1971, were officially recognized in 1996. Bobbi Gibb was the first woman to finish the race in 1966, while Nina Kuscsik was the first official winner in 1972. Catherine Ndereba's four victories between 2000 and 2005 are the most in the women's open division. The Boston Marathon became the first major marathon to include a wheelchair division, in 1975, which was won by Robert Hall, though the first person to complete the race in a wheelchair had been Eugene Roberts in 1970. The first female wheelchair finisher, Sharon Rahn, came in 1977. Ernst van Dyk's ten wins in the men's wheelchair division are the most of any athlete at Boston, while Jean Driscoll leads the women's wheelchair division with seven wins, and holds the overall record for the most consecutive victories, also seven. A handcyclist division was recognized for the first time in 2017, though handcyclists had been taking part prior to that. Tom Davis has won the first three men's handcyclist races since it was officially recognized in 2017, and still holds the course record. Alicia Dana has won the women's handcycle race three times, setting a course record each time.

The course was designed to replicate the original marathon in Greece; a hilly point-to-point race, and as such has not been the venue for many world records. (Note: World records for road races set before 2004 were retrospectively recognised by the IAAF (now World Athletics), and were not officially recognised before that time.) Suh Yun-bok set the only World Athletics-ratified men's open division world record in 1947, in a time of 2:25:39. Two apparent world record times set between 1951 and 1956 by Keizo Yamada and Antti Viskari were later struck when the course was found to be over 1,000 yards (910 m) short. In 1975, Liane Winter took advantage of a 25 miles per hour (40 km/h) following wind to set a world record in the women's open race of 2:42:24, and eight years later, Joan Benoit beat a world record that had only been set the day before at the London Marathon, finishing in 2:22:43. Since 1990, the Boston Marathon has been ineligible for world records, as the start and finish are too far away from each other, and the race is a net downhill. In 2011, Geoffrey Mutai won the race in 2:03:02, which was the world's fastest time for the marathon, beating the official world record by 57 seconds.

== Winners ==
- All Editions Results

=== Key ===
World record (Note: Since 1990, the Boston Marathon has been ineligible for world records, as the start and finish are too far away from each other, and the race is a net downhill.)
Current course record
Course record
Unofficial course record
Short course

=== Men's open division ===
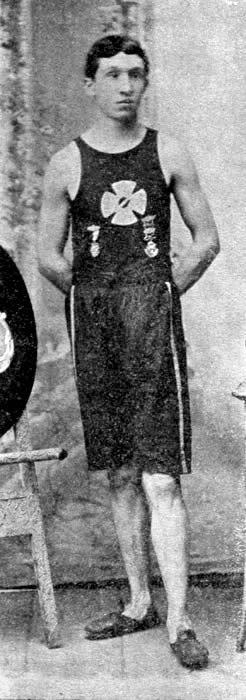
John McDermott won the first Boston Marathon in 1897.

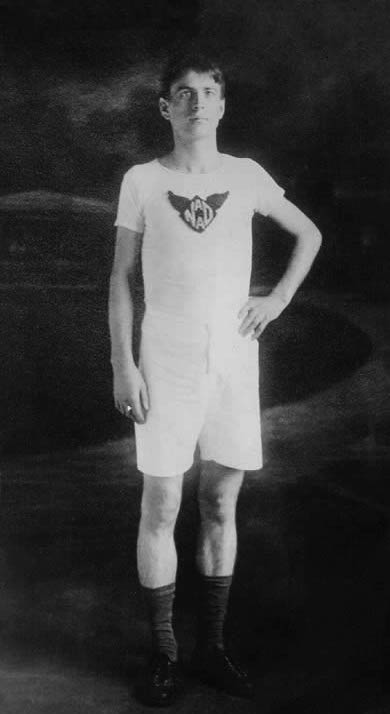
Clarence DeMar has won the Boston Marathon seven times, more than any other runner in the Men's open division.

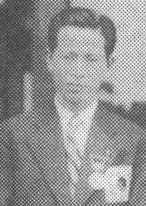
Suh Yun-bok set a world record at the 1947 Boston Marathon.

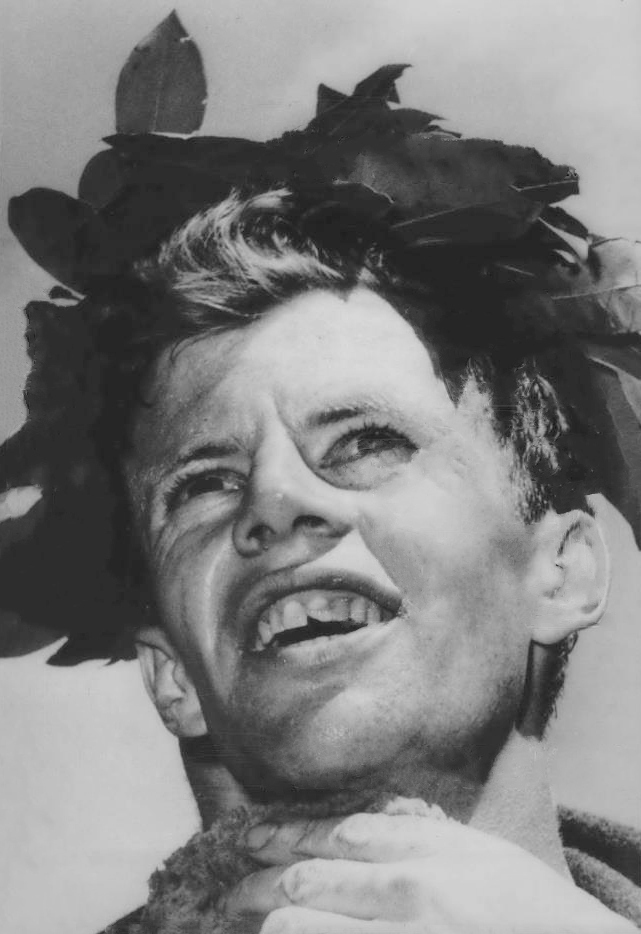
John J. Kelley won the 1957 Boston Marathon with a course record.

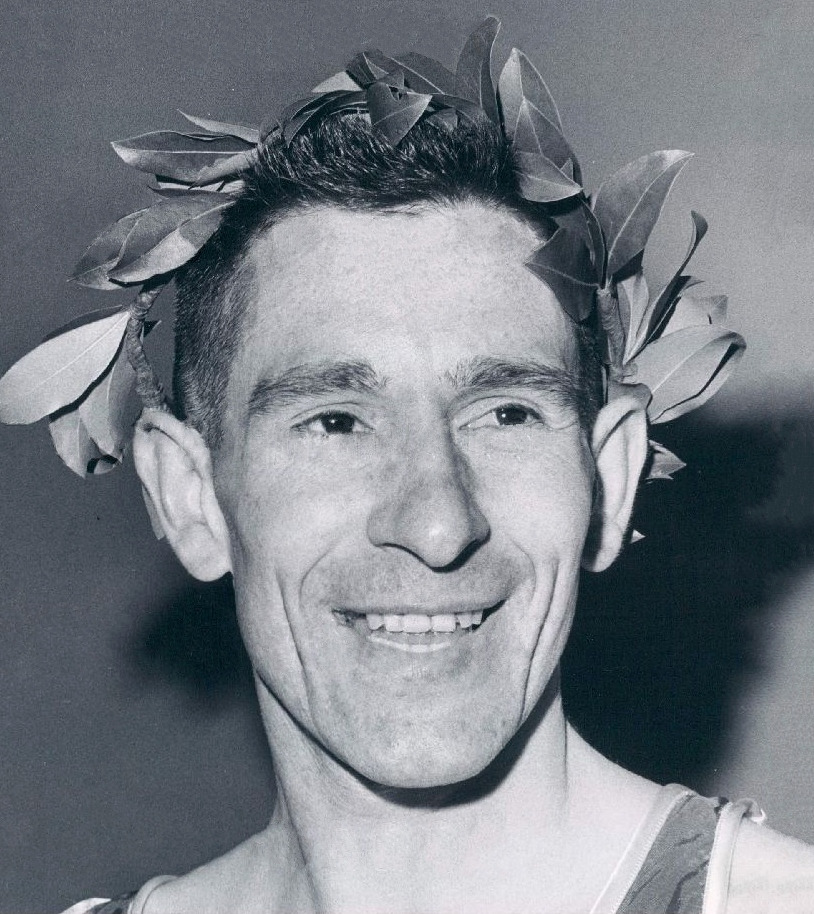
Aurèle Vandendriessche won back-to-back marathons in 1963 and 1964.

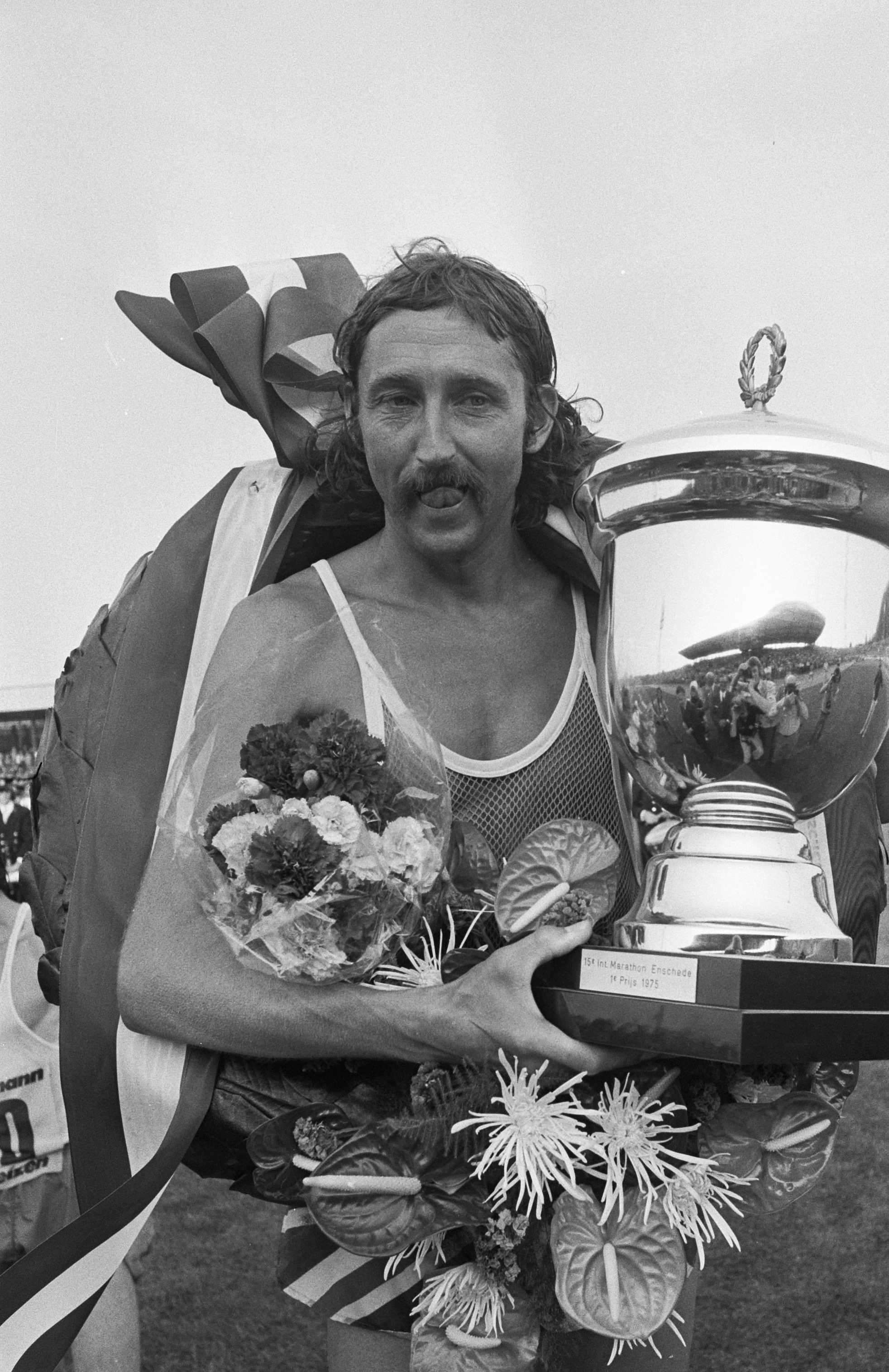
Ron Hill set a course record at the 1970 Boston Marathon.

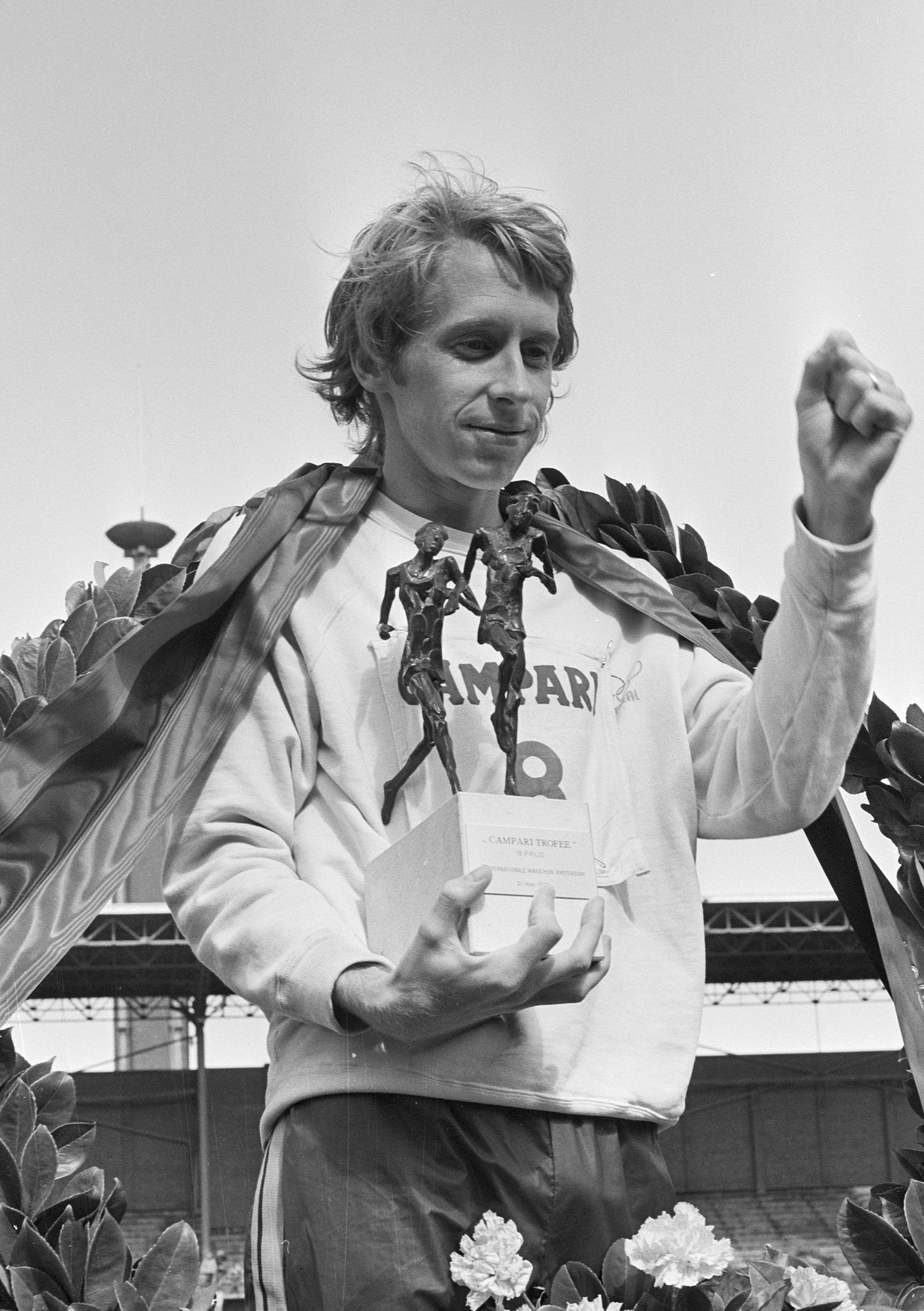
Bill Rodgers won the race four times between 1975 and 1980.

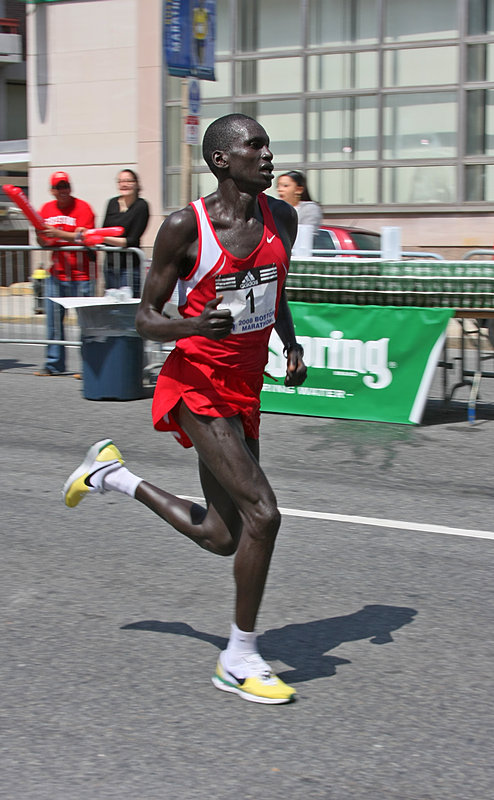
Robert Kipkoech Cheruiyot won the race four times, and set two course records.

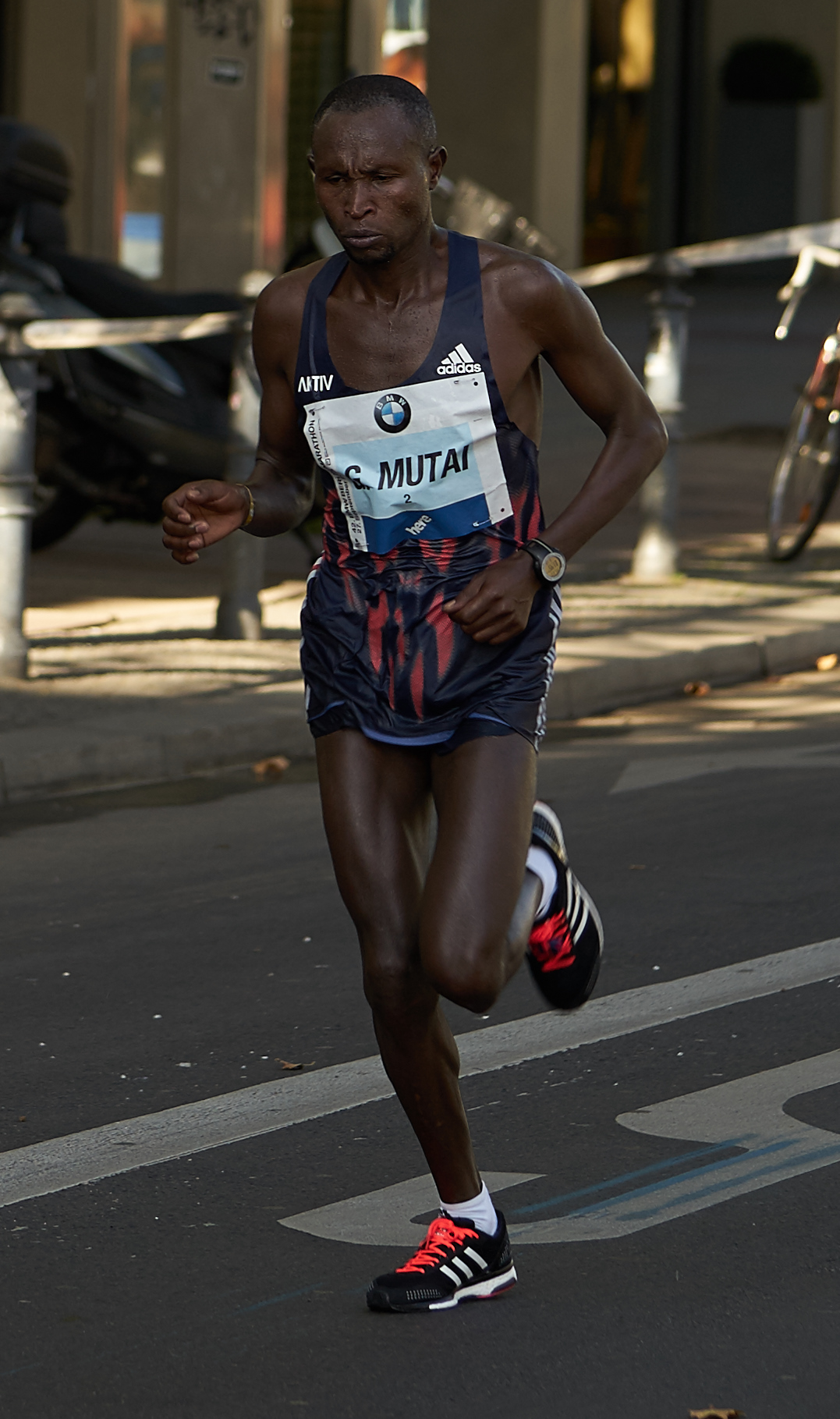
Geoffrey Mutai holds the current course record, 2:03:02, set in 2011.

Winners: Men's open division
Year	Winner	Country	Time	Distance	Notes
1897	John McDermott	United States	2:55:10	24.5 miles (39.4 km)	Starting line in Ashland, Massachusetts
1898	Ronald MacDonald	Canada	2:42:00	24.5 miles (39.4 km)	
1899	Lawrence Brignolia	United States	2:54:38	24.5 miles (39.4 km)	
1900	Jack Caffery	Canada	2:39:44	24.5 miles (39.4 km)	
1901	Jack Caffery	Canada	2:29:23	24.5 miles (39.4 km)	Second victory
1902	Sammy Mellor	United States	2:43:12	24.5 miles (39.4 km)	
1903	John Lordan	United States	2:41:29	24.5 miles (39.4 km)	
1904	Michael Spring	United States	2:38:04	24.5 miles (39.4 km)	
1905	Frederick Lorz	United States	2:38:25	24.5 miles (39.4 km)	
1906	Timothy Ford	United States	2:45:45	24.5 miles (39.4 km)	
1907	Tom Longboat	Canada	2:24:24	24.5 miles (39.4 km)	
1908	Thomas Morrissey	United States	2:25:43	24.5 miles (39.4 km)	
1909	Henri Renaud	United States	2:53:36	24.5 miles (39.4 km)	
1910	Fred S. Cameron	Canada	2:28:52	24.5 miles (39.4 km)	
1911	Clarence DeMar	United States	2:21:39	24.5 miles (39.4 km)	
1912	Michael J. Ryan	United States	2:21:18	24.5 miles (39.4 km)	
1913	Fritz Carlson	United States	2:25:14	24.5 miles (39.4 km)	
1914	Jimmy Duffy	Canada	2:25:14	24.5 miles (39.4 km)	
1915	Édouard Fabre	Canada	2:31:41	24.5 miles (39.4 km)	
1916	Arthur Roth	United States	2:27:16	24.5 miles (39.4 km)	
1917	Bill Kennedy	United States	2:28:37	24.5 miles (39.4 km)	
1918	Individual marathon canceled due to World War I		2:29:53	24.5 miles (39.4 km)	Ten-man ekiden was held over the course for military teams. Camp Devens was the winner.
1919	Carl Linder	United States	2:29:13	24.5 miles (39.4 km)	
1920	Panagiotis Trivoulidas	Greece	2:29:31	24.5 miles (39.4 km)	
1921	Frank Zuna	United States	2:18:57	24.5 miles (39.4 km)	
1922	Clarence DeMar	United States	2:18:10	24.5 miles (39.4 km)	Second victory; 24.5-mile course record
1923	Clarence DeMar	United States	2:23:47	24.5 miles (39.4 km)	Third victory
1924	Clarence DeMar	United States	2:29:40	26.1 miles (42.0 km)	Starting line moved to Hopkinton, Massachusetts; fourth victory for DeMar
1925	Charles Mellor	United States	2:33:00	26.1 miles (42.0 km)	
1926	Johnny Miles	Canada	2:25:40	26.1 miles (42.0 km)	
1927	Clarence DeMar	United States	2:40:22	26.2 miles (42.2 km)	Course record, fifth victory
1928	Clarence DeMar	United States	2:37:07	26.2 miles (42.2 km)	Course record, sixth victory
1929	Johnny Miles	Canada	2:33:08	26.2 miles (42.2 km)	Course record, second victory
1930	Clarence DeMar	United States	2:34:48	26.2 miles (42.2 km)	Seventh victory
1931	James Henigan	United States	2:46:45	26.2 miles (42.2 km)	
1932	Paul de Bruyn	Germany	2:33:36	26.2 miles (42.2 km)	
1933	Les Pawson	United States	2:31:01	26.2 miles (42.2 km)	Course record
1934	Dave Komonen	Finland	2:32:53	26.2 miles (42.2 km)	
1935	Johnny Kelley	United States	2:32:07	26.2 miles (42.2 km)	
1936	Ellison Brown	United States	2:33:40	26.2 miles (42.2 km)	
1937	Walter Young	Canada	2:33:20	26.2 miles (42.2 km)	
1938	Les Pawson	United States	2:35:34	26.2 miles (42.2 km)	Second victory
1939	Ellison Brown	United States	2:28:51	26.2 miles (42.2 km)	Course record, second victory
1940	Gérard Côté	Canada	2:28:28	26.2 miles (42.2 km)	Course record
1941	Les Pawson	United States	2:30:38	26.2 miles (42.2 km)	Third victory
1942	Joe Smith	United States	2:26:51	26.2 miles (42.2 km)	Course record
1943	Gérard Côté	Canada	2:28:25	26.2 miles (42.2 km)	Second victory
1944	Gérard Côté	Canada	2:31:50	26.2 miles (42.2 km)	Third victory
1945	Johnny Kelley	United States	2:30:40	26.2 miles (42.2 km)	Second victory
1946	Stylianos Kyriakides	Greece	2:29:27	26.2 miles (42.2 km)	
1947	Suh Yun-bok	South Korea	2:25:39	26.2 miles (42.2 km)	World record
1948	Gérard Côté	Canada	2:31:02	26.2 miles (42.2 km)	Fourth victory
1949	Gösta Leandersson	Sweden	2:31:50	26.2 miles (42.2 km)	
1950	Ham Kee-yong	South Korea	2:32:39	26.2 miles (42.2 km)	
1951	Shigeki Tanaka	Japan	2:27:45	25.7 miles (41.4 km)	
1952	Mateo Flores	Guatemala	2:31:53	25.7 miles (41.4 km)	
1953	Keizo Yamada	Japan	2:18:51	25.7 miles (41.4 km)	Considered a world record until it was discovered that the course was short.
1954	Veikko Karvonen	Finland	2:20:39	25.7 miles (41.4 km)	
1955	Hideo Hamamura	Japan	2:18:22	25.7 miles (41.4 km)	
1956	Antti Viskari	Finland	2:14:14	25.7 miles (41.4 km)	25.7-mile (41.4 km) course record; considered a world record until it was discovered that the course was short.
1957	John J. Kelley	United States	2:20:05	26.2 miles (42.2 km)	Course record
1958	Franjo Mihalic	Yugoslavia	2:25:54	26.2 miles (42.2 km)	
1959	Eino Oksanen	Finland	2:22:42	26.2 miles (42.2 km)	
1960	Paavo Kotila	Finland	2:20:54	26.2 miles (42.2 km)	
1961	Eino Oksanen	Finland	2:23:39	26.2 miles (42.2 km)	Second victory
1962	Eino Oksanen	Finland	2:23:48	26.2 miles (42.2 km)	Third victory
1963	Aurèle Vandendriessche	Belgium	2:18:58	26.2 miles (42.2 km)	Course record
1964	Aurèle Vandendriessche	Belgium	2:19:59	26.2 miles (42.2 km)	Second victory
1965	Morio Shigematsu	Japan	2:16:33	26.2 miles (42.2 km)	Course record
1966	Kenji Kimihara	Japan	2:17:11	26.2 miles (42.2 km)	
1967	Dave McKenzie	New Zealand	2:15:45	26.2 miles (42.2 km)	Course record
1968	Amby Burfoot	United States	2:22:17	26.2 miles (42.2 km)	
1969	Yoshiaki Unetani	Japan	2:13:49	26.2 miles (42.2 km)	Course record
1970	Ron Hill	United Kingdom	2:10:30	26.2 miles (42.2 km)	Course record
1971	Álvaro Mejía	Colombia	2:18:45	26.2 miles (42.2 km)	
1972	Olavi Suomalainen	Finland	2:15:39	26.2 miles (42.2 km)	
1973	Jon Anderson	United States	2:16:03	26.2 miles (42.2 km)	
1974	Neil Cusack	Ireland	2:13:39	26.2 miles (42.2 km)	
1975	Bill Rodgers	United States	2:09:55	26.2 miles (42.2 km)	Course record
1976	Jack Fultz	United States	2:20:19	26.2 miles (42.2 km)	
1977	Jerome Drayton	Canada	2:14:46	26.2 miles (42.2 km)	
1978	Bill Rodgers	United States	2:10:13	26.2 miles (42.2 km)	Second victory
1979	Bill Rodgers	United States	2:09:27	26.2 miles (42.2 km)	Course record, third victory
1980	Bill Rodgers	United States	2:12:11	26.2 miles (42.2 km)	Fourth victory
1981	Toshihiko Seko	Japan	2:09:26	26.2 miles (42.2 km)	Course record
1982	Alberto Salazar	United States	2:08:52	26.2 miles (42.2 km)	Course record
1983	Greg Meyer	United States	2:09:00	26.2 miles (42.2 km)	
1984	Geoff Smith	United Kingdom	2:10:34	26.2 miles (42.2 km)	
1985	Geoff Smith	United Kingdom	2:14:05	26.2 miles (42.2 km)	Second victory
1986	Robert de Castella	Australia	2:07:51	26.2 miles (42.2 km)	Course record
1987	Toshihiko Seko	Japan	2:11:50	26.2 miles (42.2 km)	Second victory
1988	Ibrahim Hussein	Kenya	2:08:43	26.2 miles (42.2 km)	
1989	Abebe Mekonnen	Ethiopia	2:09:06	26.2 miles (42.2 km)	
1990	Gelindo Bordin	Italy	2:08:19	26.2 miles (42.2 km)	
1991	Ibrahim Hussein	Kenya	2:11:06	26.2 miles (42.2 km)	Second victory
1992	Ibrahim Hussein	Kenya	2:08:14	26.2 miles (42.2 km)	Third victory
1993	Cosmas Ndeti	Kenya	2:09:33	26.2 miles (42.2 km)	
1994	Cosmas Ndeti	Kenya	2:07:15	26.2 miles (42.2 km)	Course record, second victory
1995	Cosmas Ndeti	Kenya	2:09:22	26.2 miles (42.2 km)	Third victory
1996	Moses Tanui	Kenya	2:09:15	26.2 miles (42.2 km)	
1997	Lameck Aguta	Kenya	2:10:34	26.2 miles (42.2 km)	
1998	Moses Tanui	Kenya	2:07:34	26.2 miles (42.2 km)	Second victory
1999	Joseph Chebet	Kenya	2:09:52	26.2 miles (42.2 km)	
2000	Elijah Lagat	Kenya	2:09:47	26.2 miles (42.2 km)	
2001	Lee Bong-ju	South Korea	2:09:43	26.2 miles (42.2 km)	
2002	Rodgers Rop	Kenya	2:09:02	26.2 miles (42.2 km)	
2003	Robert Kipkoech Cheruiyot	Kenya	2:10:11	26.2 miles (42.2 km)	
2004	Timothy Cherigat	Kenya	2:10:37	26.2 miles (42.2 km)	
2005	Hailu Negussie	Ethiopia	2:11:44	26.2 miles (42.2 km)	
2006	Robert Kipkoech Cheruiyot	Kenya	2:07:14	26.2 miles (42.2 km)	Course record, second victory
2007	Robert Kipkoech Cheruiyot	Kenya	2:14:13	26.2 miles (42.2 km)	Third victory
2008	Robert Kipkoech Cheruiyot	Kenya	2:07:45	26.2 miles (42.2 km)	Fourth victory
2009	Deriba Merga	Ethiopia	2:08:42	26.2 miles (42.2 km)	
2010	Robert Kiprono Cheruiyot	Kenya	2:05:52	26.2 miles (42.2 km)	Course record
2011	Geoffrey Mutai	Kenya	2:03:02	26.2 miles (42.2 km)	former men's course record; world's fastest time (Note: Geoffrey Mutai's winning time in 2011 of 2:03:02 beat the world record by 57 seconds, making it the fastest marathon time recorded at the time. It remained the fastest time until Dennis Kimetto set an official world record of 2:02:57 at the 2014 Berlin Marathon.)
2012	Wesley Korir	Kenya	2:12:40	26.2 miles (42.2 km)	
2013	Lelisa Desisa	Ethiopia	2:10:22	26.2 miles (42.2 km)	
2014	Meb Keflezighi	United States	2:08:37	26.2 miles (42.2 km)	
2015	Lelisa Desisa	Ethiopia	2:09:17	26.2 miles (42.2 km)	Second victory
2016	Lemi Berhanu Hayle	Ethiopia	2:12:45	26.2 miles (42.2 km)	
2017	Geoffrey Kirui	Kenya	2:09:37	26.2 miles (42.2 km)	
2018	Yuki Kawauchi	Japan	2:15:58	26.2 miles (42.2 km)	
2019	Lawrence Cherono	Kenya	2:07:57	26.2 miles (42.2 km)	
2020	Canceled due to the COVID-19 pandemic; "virtual alternative" held in September				
2021	Benson Kipruto	Kenya	2:09:51	26.2 miles (42.2 km)	Held in October
2022	Evans Chebet	Kenya	2:06:51	26.2 miles (42.2 km)	
2023	Evans Chebet	Kenya	2:05:54	26.2 miles (42.2 km)	
2024	Sisay Lemma	Ethiopia	2:06:17	26.2 miles (42.2 km)	
2025	John Korir	Kenya	2:04:45	26.2 miles (42.2 km)	Brother of 2012 winner Wesley Korir
2026	John Korir	Kenya	2:01:50		Second victory, course record

=== Women's open division ===
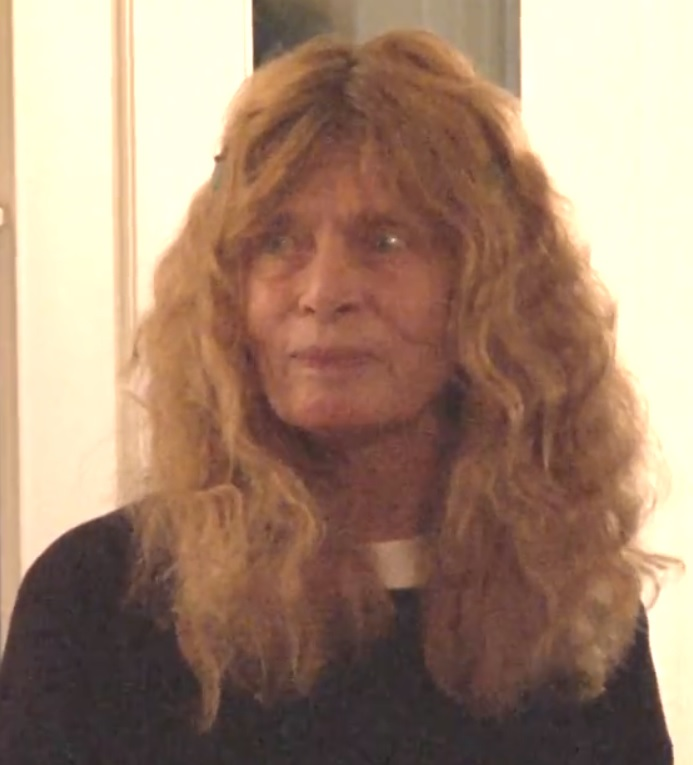
Bobbi Gibb, pictured in 2016, won the first three, unofficial, women's marathons.

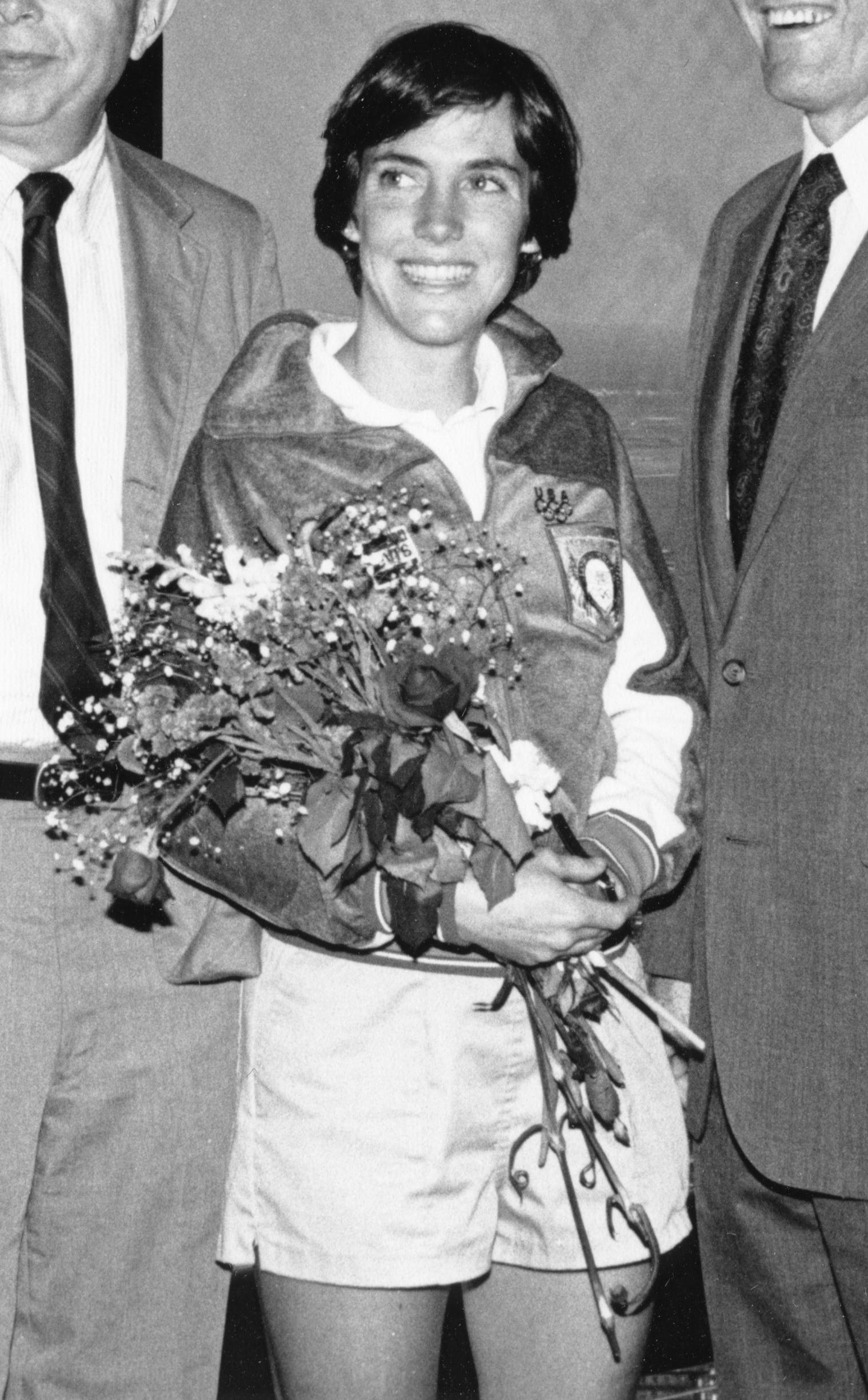
Joan Benoit set a world record at the 1983 Boston Marathon.

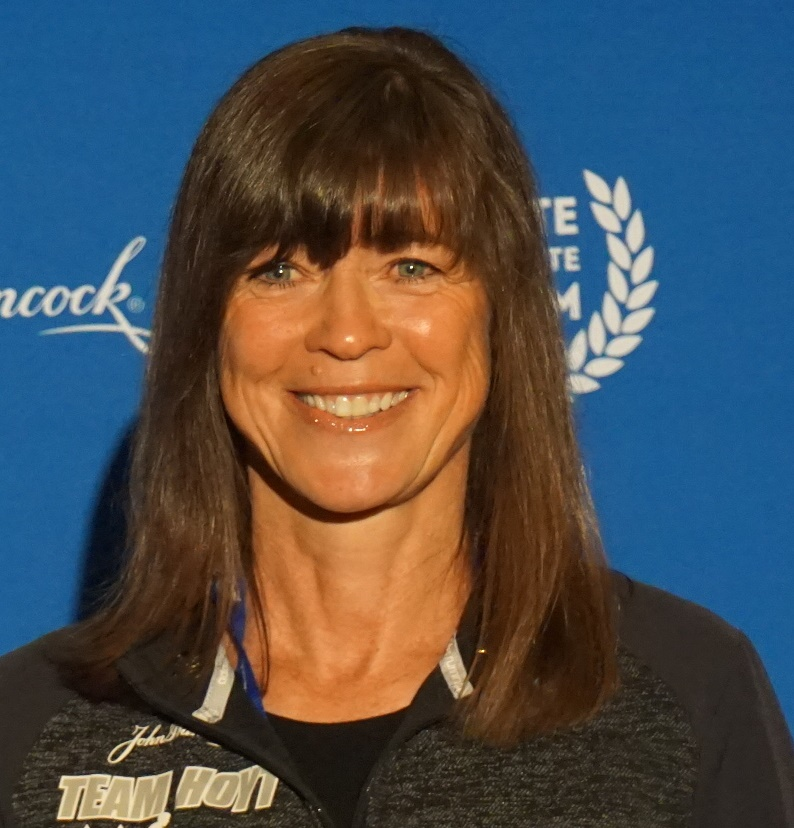
Uta Pippig, pictured in 2019, won three consecutive Boston Marathons from 1994 to 1996.

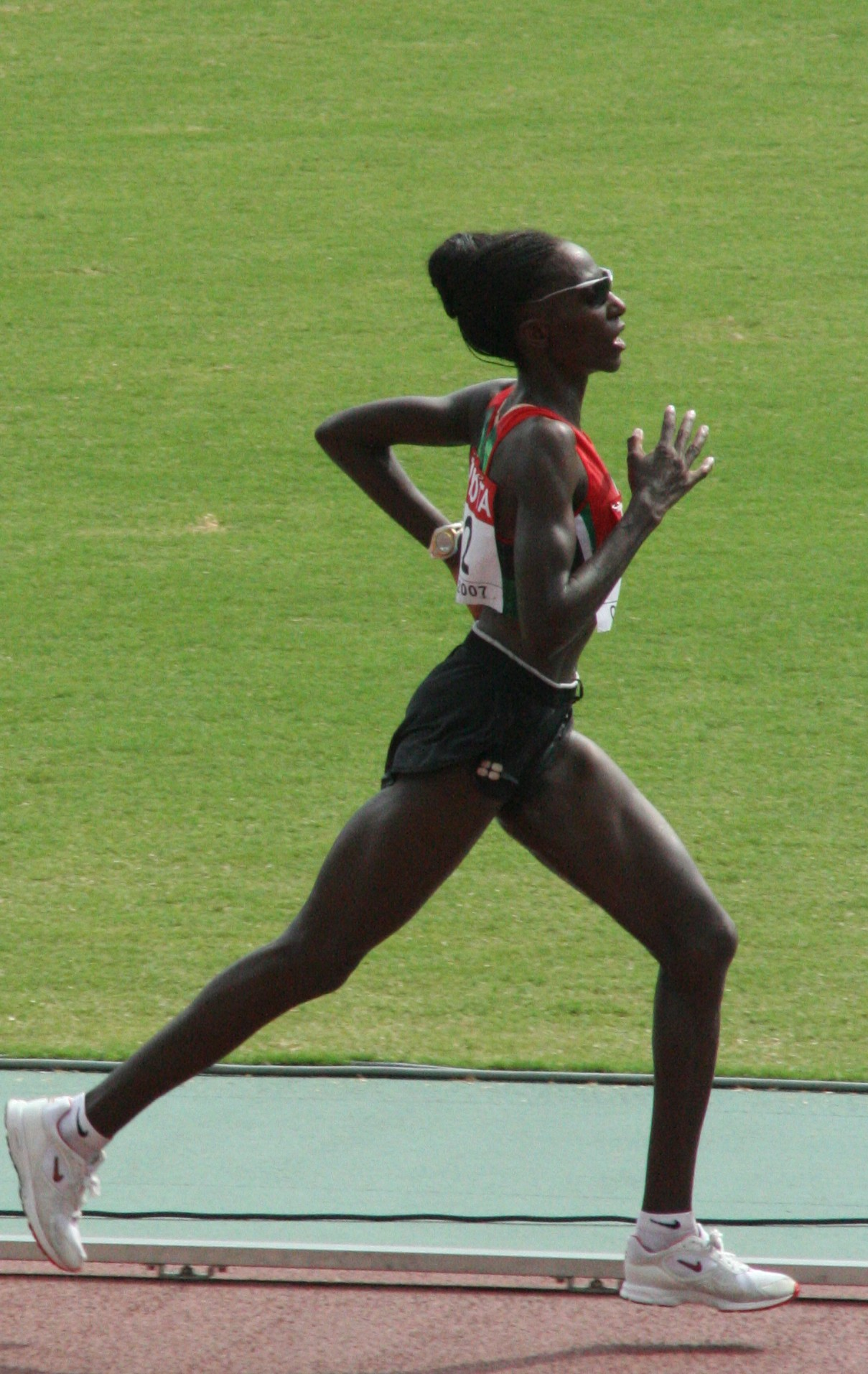
Catherine Ndereba won the Boston Marathon four times between 2000 and 2005.

Winners: Women's open division
Year	Winner	Country	Time	Notes
1966	Bobbi Gibb	United States	3:21:40	Unofficial era, course record
1967	Bobbi Gibb	United States	3:27:17	Unofficial era, second victory
1968	Bobbi Gibb	United States	3:30:00	Unofficial era, third victory
1969	Sara Mae Berman	United States	3:22:46	Unofficial era
1970	Sara Mae Berman	United States	3:05:07	Unofficial era, course record, second victory
1971	Sara Mae Berman	United States	3:08:30	Unofficial era, third victory
1972	Nina Kuscsik	United States	3:10:26	First year that women were officially sanctioned, official course record
1973	Jacqueline Hansen	United States	3:05:59	Official course record
1974	Miki Gorman	United States	2:47:11	Course record
1975	Liane Winter	Germany	2:42:24	World record. Represented the Federal Republic of Germany (commonly known as West Germany before 1990).
1976	Kim Merritt	United States	2:47:10	
1977	Miki Gorman	United States	2:48:33	Second victory
1978	Gayle Barron	United States	2:44:52	
1979	Joan Benoit	United States	2:35:15	Course record
1980	Jacqueline Gareau	Canada	2:34:28	Course record; Rosie Ruiz was declared the winner of the 1980 race, but was later stripped of her win when it was discovered she did not run the entire race.
1981	Allison Roe	New Zealand	2:26:46	Course record
1982	Charlotte Teske	Germany	2:29:33	Represented the Federal Republic of Germany (commonly known as West Germany before 1990).
1983	Joan Benoit	United States	2:22:43	World record, second victory
1984	Lorraine Moller	New Zealand	2:29:28	
1985	Lisa Larsen Weidenbach	United States	2:34:06	
1986	Ingrid Kristiansen	Norway	2:24:55	
1987	Rosa Mota	Portugal	2:25:21	
1988	Rosa Mota	Portugal	2:24:30	Second victory
1989	Ingrid Kristiansen	Norway	2:24:33	Second victory
1990	Rosa Mota	Portugal	2:25:24	Third victory
1991	Wanda Panfil	Poland	2:24:18	
1992	Olga Markova	Russia	2:23:43	
1993	Olga Markova	Russia	2:25:27	Second victory
1994	Uta Pippig	Germany	2:21:45	Course record
1995	Uta Pippig	Germany	2:25:11	Second victory
1996	Uta Pippig	Germany	2:27:12	Third victory
1997	Fatuma Roba	Ethiopia	2:26:23	
1998	Fatuma Roba	Ethiopia	2:23:21	Second victory
1999	Fatuma Roba	Ethiopia	2:23:25	Third victory
2000	Catherine Ndereba	Kenya	2:26:11	
2001	Catherine Ndereba	Kenya	2:23:53	Second victory
2002	Margaret Okayo	Kenya	2:20:43	Course record
2003	Svetlana Zakharova	Russia	2:25:19	
2004	Catherine Ndereba	Kenya	2:24:27	Third victory
2005	Catherine Ndereba	Kenya	2:25:12	Fourth victory
2006	Rita Jeptoo	Kenya	2:23:38	
2007	Lidiya Grigoryeva	Russia	2:29:18	
2008	Dire Tune	Ethiopia	2:25:25	
2009	Salina Kosgei	Kenya	2:32:16	
2010	Teyba Erkesso	Ethiopia	2:26:11	
2011	Caroline Kilel	Kenya	2:22:36	
2012	Sharon Cherop	Kenya	2:31:50	
2013	Rita Jeptoo	Kenya	2:26:25	Second victory
2014	Buzunesh Deba	Ethiopia	2:19:59	Course record; Rita Jeptoo originally won the 2014 race, but was subsequently disqualified for taking performance-enhancing drugs.
2015	Caroline Rotich	Kenya	2:24:55	
2016	Atsede Bayisa	Ethiopia	2:29:19	
2017	Edna Kiplagat	Kenya	2:21:52	
2018	Desiree Linden	United States	2:39:54	
2019	Worknesh Degefa	Ethiopia	2:23:31	
2020	Canceled due to the COVID-19 pandemic; "virtual alternative" held in September			
2021	Edna Kiplagat	Kenya	2:25:09	Held in October; on-course winner Diana Kipyokei was later disqualified for doping.
2022	Peres Jepchirchir	Kenya	2:21:01	
2023	Hellen Obiri	Kenya	2:21:38	
2024	Hellen Obiri	Kenya	2:22:37	Second victory
2025	Sharon Lokedi	Kenya	2:17:22	Current course record
2026	Sharon Lokedi	Kenya	2:18:51	Second victory

=== Men's wheelchair division ===
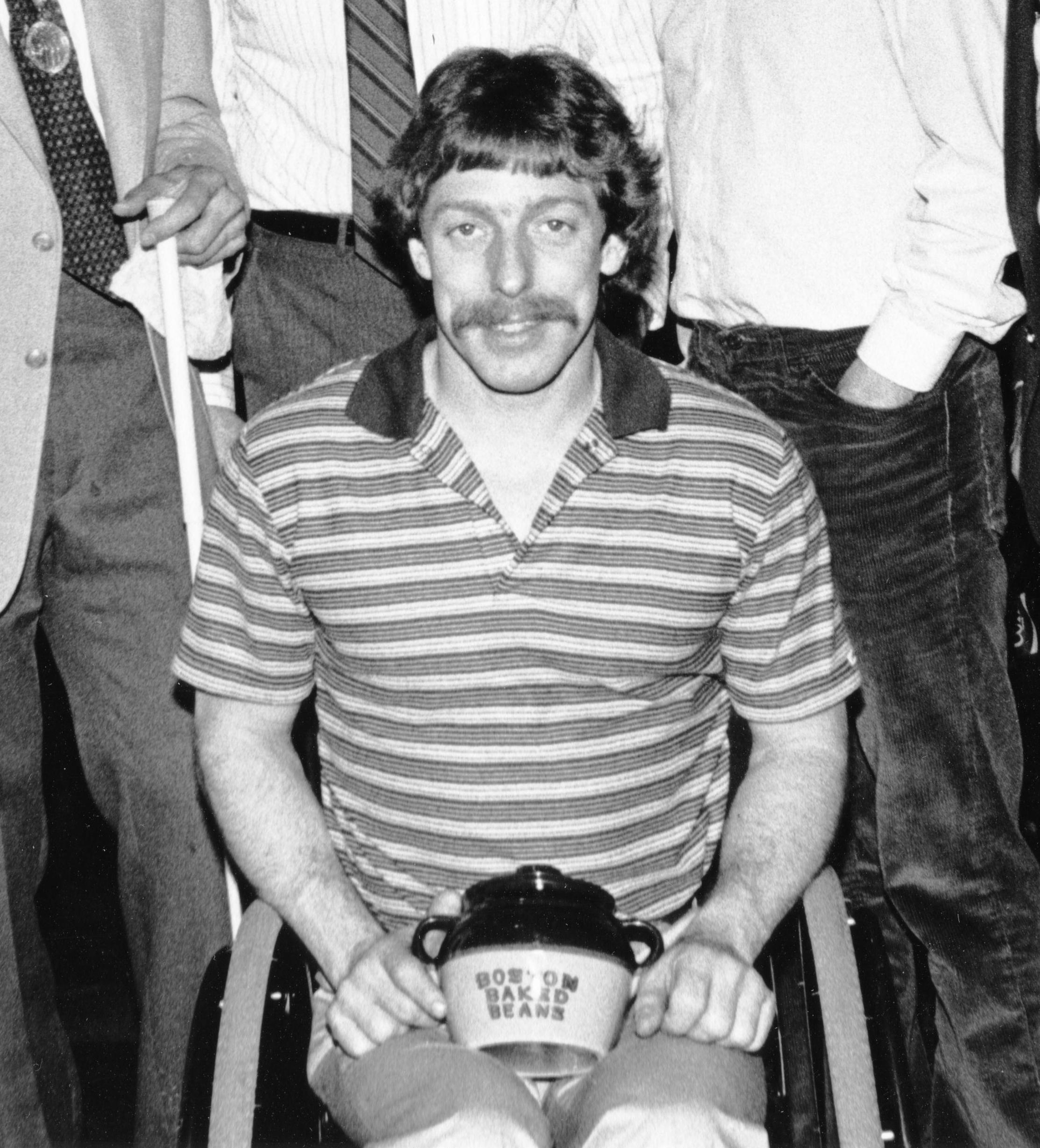
André Viger won the men's wheelchair division three times between 1984 and 1987.

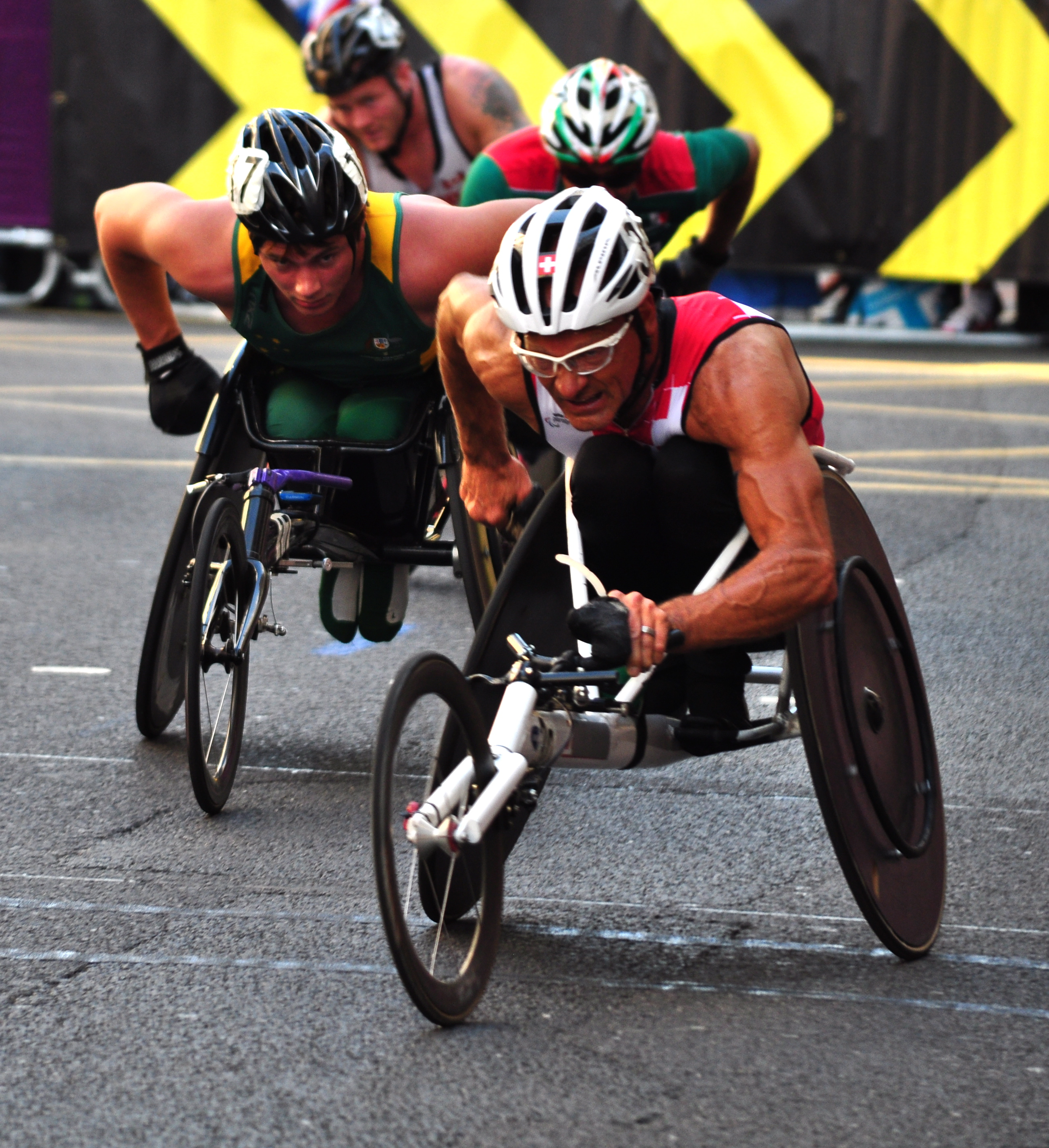
Heinz Frei's 1994 course record stood for ten years.

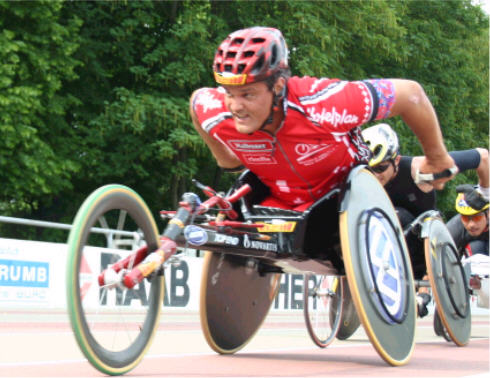
Franz Nietlispach won the race five times in six years.

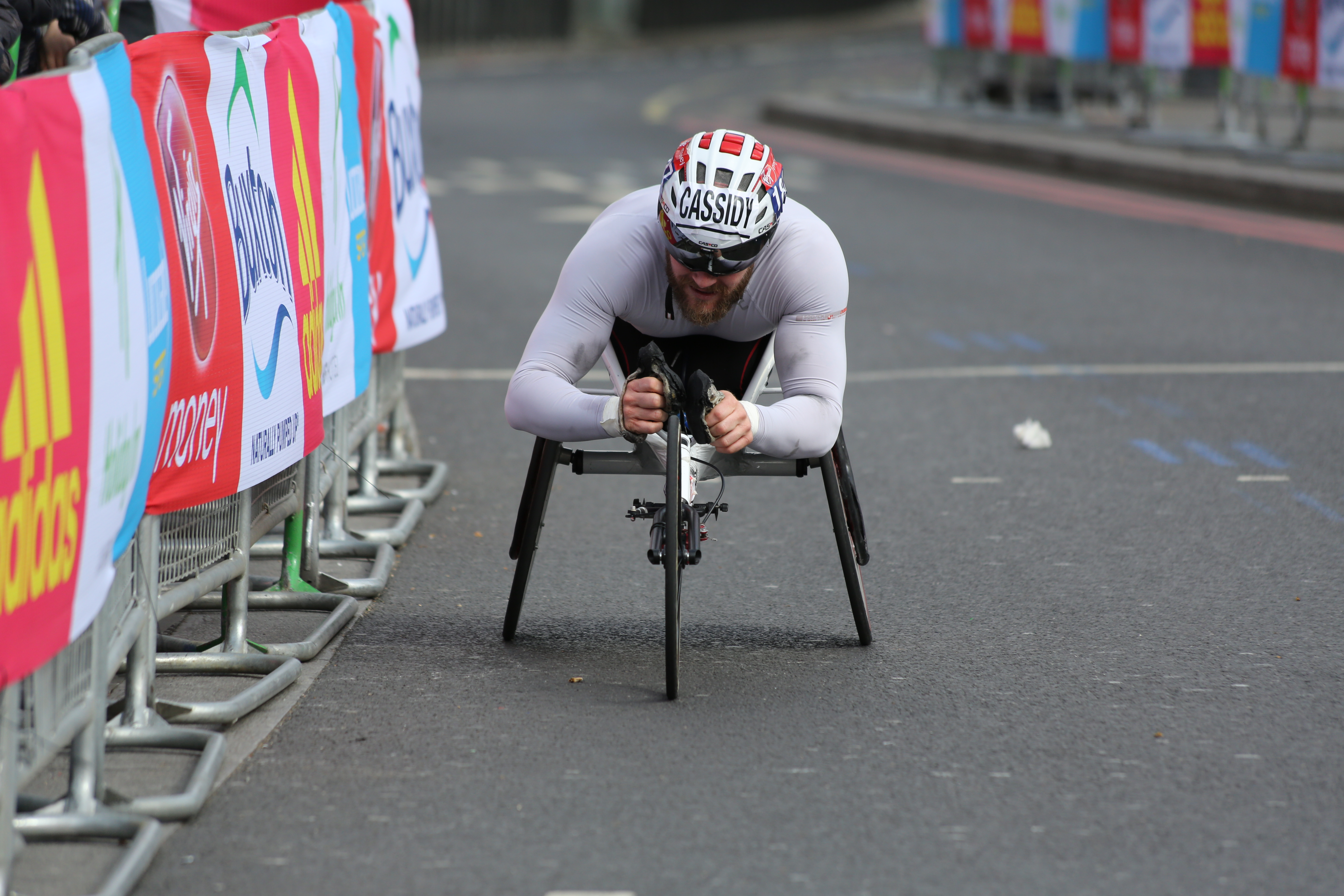
Joshua Cassidy set a course record at the 2012 Boston Marathon.

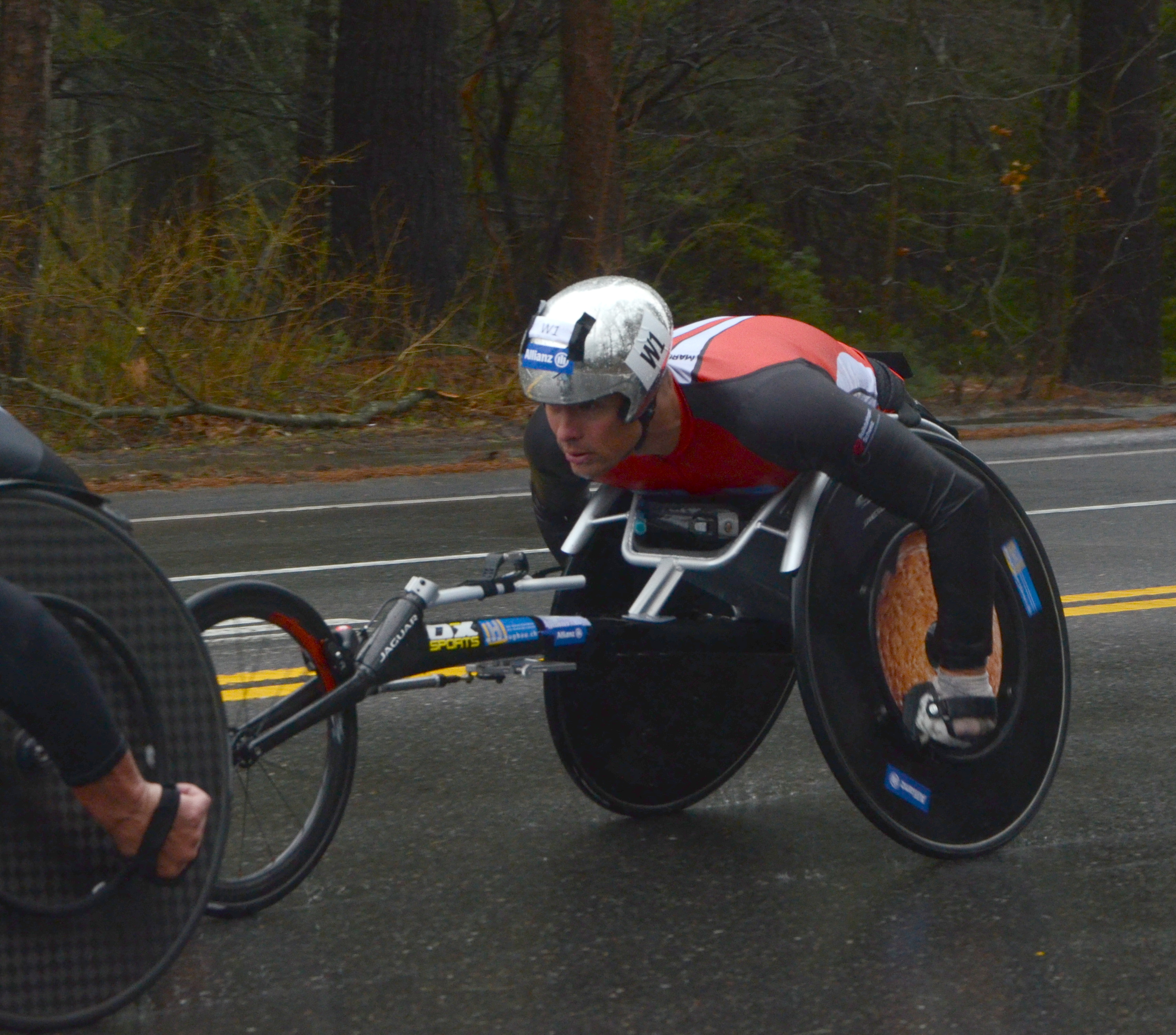
Marcel Hug has won the race eight times, and holds the current course record.

Winners: Men's wheelchair division
Year	Winner	Country	Time	Notes
1975	Bob Hall	United States	2:58:00	Course record
1976	No competitors			
1977	Bob Hall	United States	2:40:10	Course record, second victory
1978	George Murray	United States	2:26:57	Not listed as a course record by BAA (Note: Wheelchair racers set off 15 minutes ahead of the other participants.)
1979	Ken Archer	United States	2:38:59	Not listed as a course record by BAA
1980	Curt Brinkman	United States	1:55:00	Course record
1981	Jim Martinson	United States	2:00:41	
1982	Jim Knaub	United States	1:51:31	
1983	Jim Knaub	United States	1:47:10	Course record, second victory
1984	André Viger	Canada	2:05:20	
1985	George Murray	United States	1:45:34	Course record, second victory
1986	André Viger	Canada	1:43:25	Course record, second victory
1987	André Viger	Canada	1:55:42	Third victory
1988	Mustangs Badid	France	1:43:19	Course record
1989	Philippe Couprie	France	1:36:04	Course record
1990	Mustapha Badid	France	1:29:53	Course record, second victory
1991	Jim Knaub	United States	1:30:44	Third victory
1992	Jim Knaub	United States	1:26:28	Course record, fourth victory
1993	Jim Knaub	United States	1:22:17	Course record, fifth victory
1994	Heinz Frei	Switzerland	1:21:23	Course record
1995	Franz Nietlispach	Switzerland	1:25:59	
1996	Heinz Frei	Switzerland	1:30:14	Second victory
1997	Franz Nietlispach	Switzerland	1:28:14	Second victory
1998	Franz Nietlispach	Switzerland	1:21:52	Third victory
1999	Franz Nietlispach	Switzerland	1:21:36	Fourth victory
2000	Franz Nietlispach	Switzerland	1:33:32	Fifth victory
2001	Ernst van Dyk	South Africa	1:25:12	
2002	Ernst van Dyk	South Africa	1:23:19	Second victory
2003	Ernst van Dyk	South Africa	1:28:32	Third victory
2004	Ernst van Dyk	South Africa	1:18:27	Course record, fourth victory
2005	Ernst van Dyk	South Africa	1:24:11	Fifth victory
2006	Ernst van Dyk	South Africa	1:25:29	Sixth victory
2007	Masazumi Soejima	Japan	1:29:16	
2008	Ernst van Dyk	South Africa	1:26:49	Seventh victory
2009	Ernst van Dyk	South Africa	1:33:29	Eighth victory
2010	Ernst van Dyk	South Africa	1:26:53	Ninth victory
2011	Masazumi Soejima	Japan	1:18:50	Second victory
2012	Joshua Cassidy	Canada	1:18:25	Course record
2013	Hiroyuki Yamamoto	Japan	1:25:33	
2014	Ernst van Dyk	South Africa	1:20:36	Tenth victory
2015	Marcel Hug	Switzerland	1:29:53	
2016	Marcel Hug	Switzerland	1:24:01	Second victory
2017	Marcel Hug	Switzerland	1:18:03	Course record, third victory
2018	Marcel Hug	Switzerland	1:46:26	Fourth victory
2019	Daniel Romanchuk	United States	1:21:36	
2020	Canceled due to the COVID-19 pandemic			
2021	Marcel Hug	Switzerland	1:18:11	Fifth victory
2022	Daniel Romanchuk	United States	1:26:58	Second victory
2023	Marcel Hug	Switzerland	1:17:06	Course record, sixth victory
2024	Marcel Hug	Switzerland	1:15:35	Current course record, seventh victory
2025	Marcel Hug	Switzerland	1:21:34	Eighth victory

=== Women's wheelchair division ===
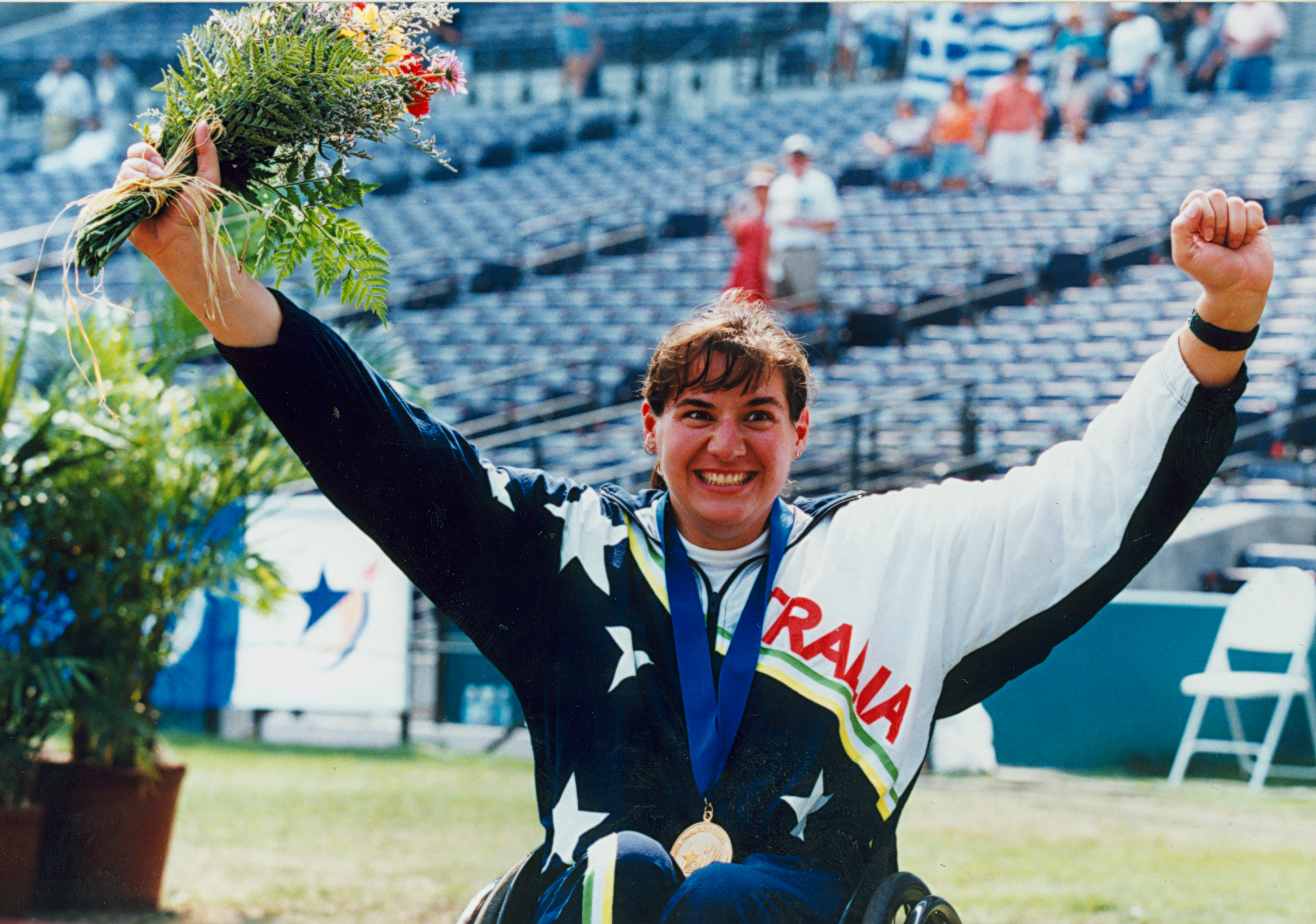
Louise Sauvage won the women's wheelchair division in three consecutive Boston Marathons, between 1997 and 1999.

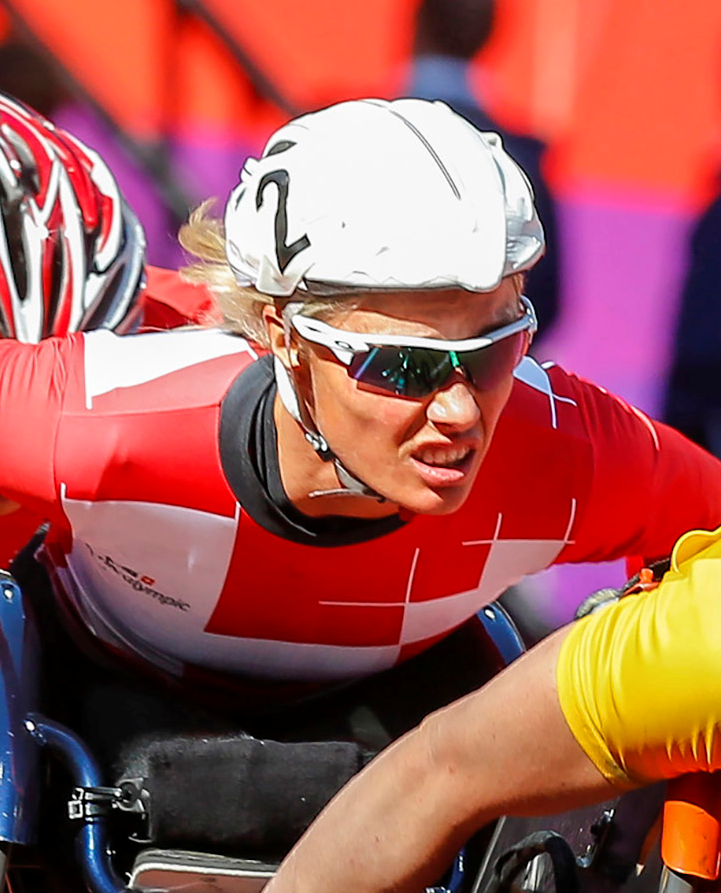
Edith Hunkeler won the race twice, in 2002 and 2006.

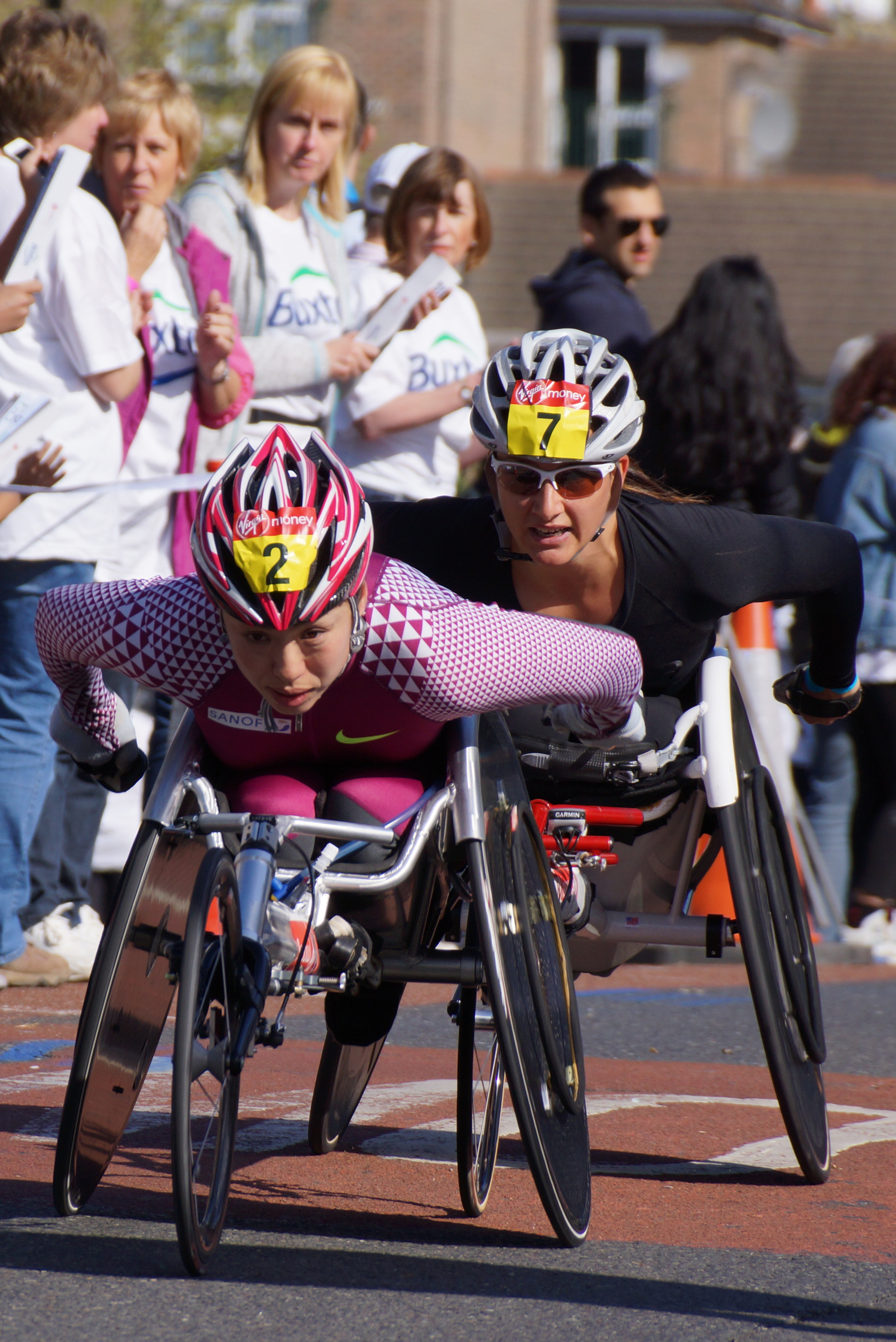
Wakako Tsuchida won the race in five consecutive years from 2007 to 2011.

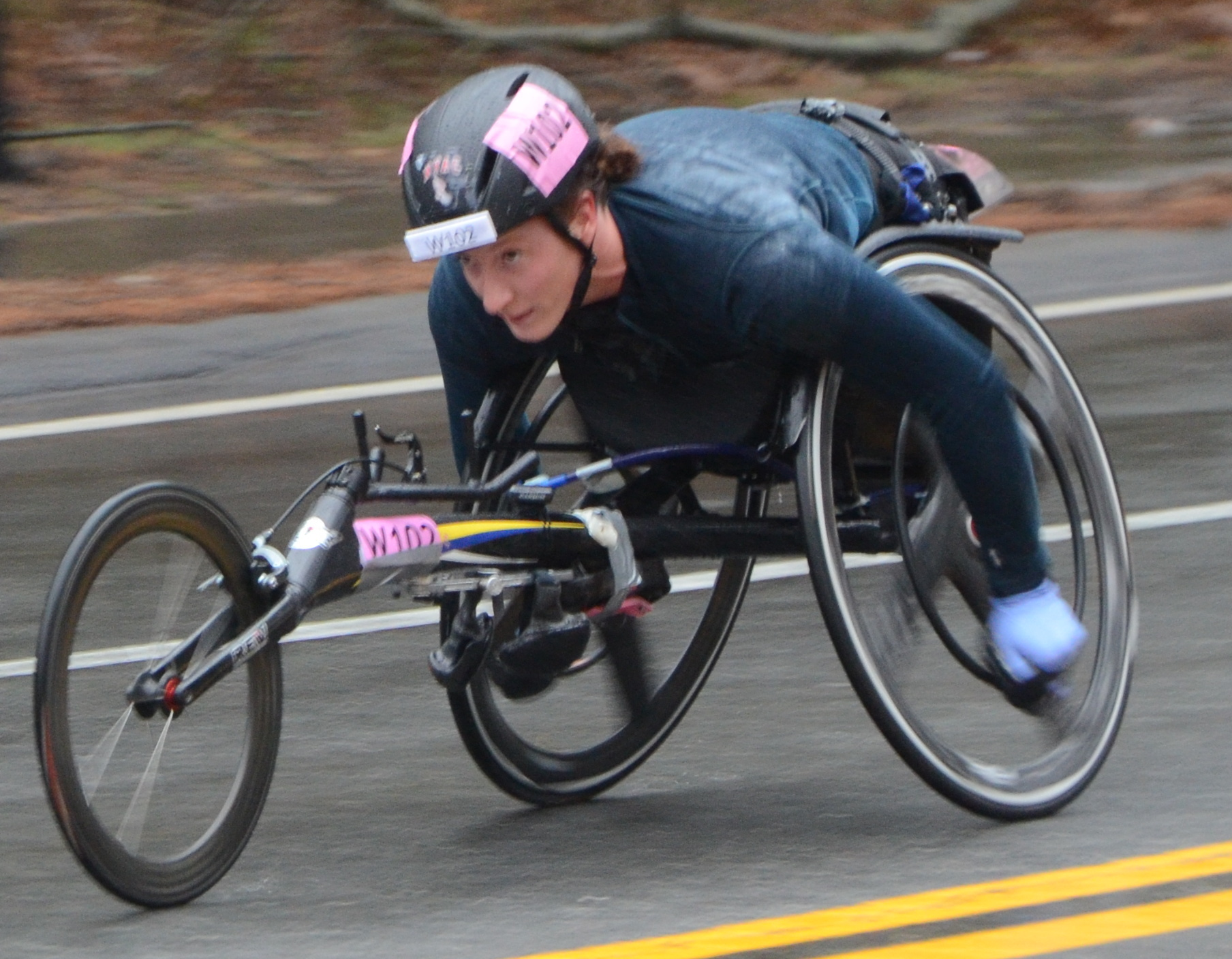
Tatyana McFadden won the race five times between 2013 and 2018.

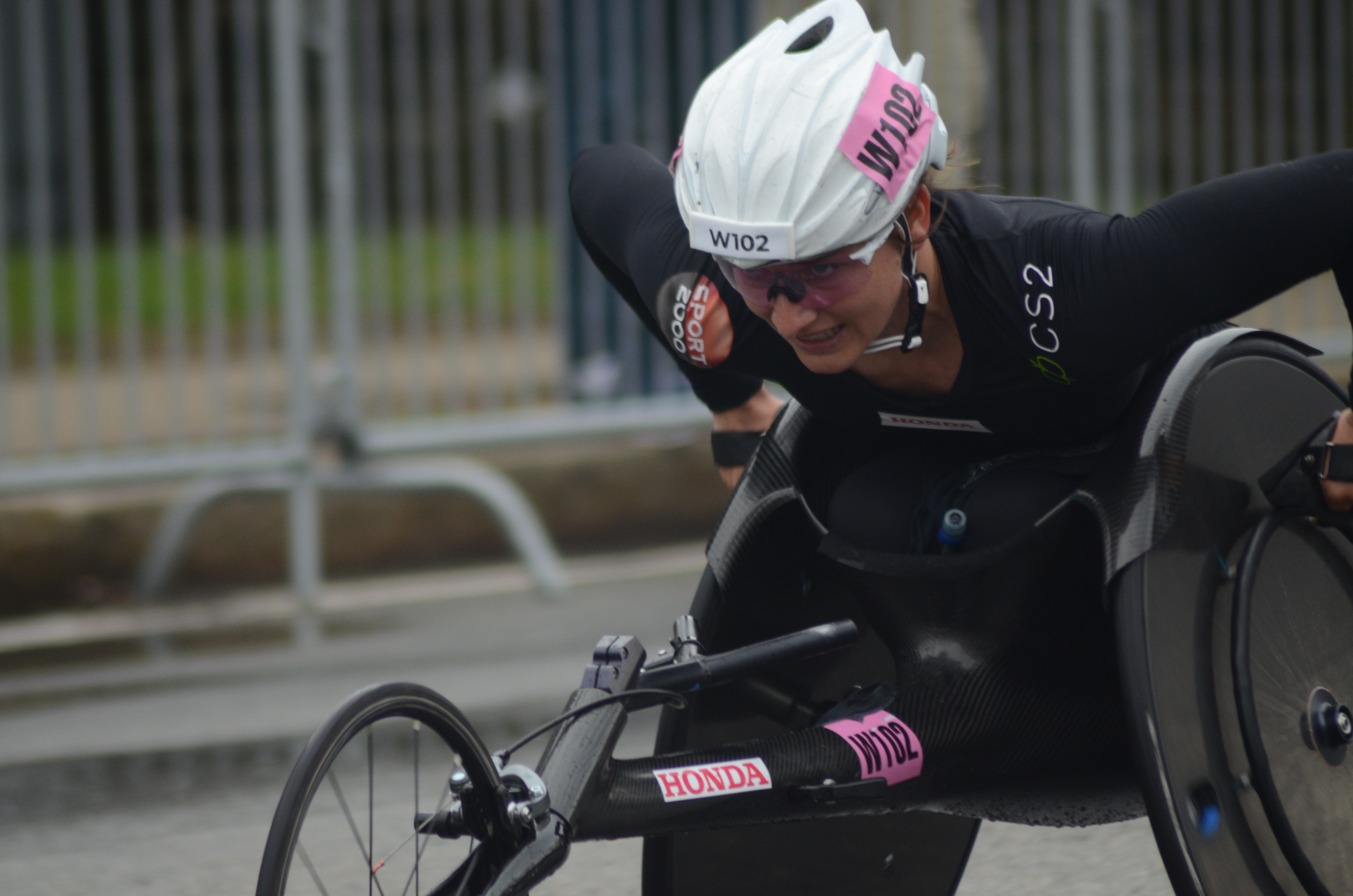
Manuela Schär holds the current course record, 1:28:17, set in 2017.

Winners: Women's wheelchair division
Year	Winner	Country	Time	Notes
1977	Sharon Rahn	United States	3:48:51	Course record
1978	Susan Shapiro	United States	3:52:35	
1979	Sheryl Bair	United States	3:27:56	Course record
1980	Sharon Limpert	United States	2:49:04	Not listed as a course record by BAA
1981	Candace Cable-Brookes	United States	2:38:41	Not listed as a course record by BAA
1982	Candace Cable-Brookes	United States	2:12:43	Course record, second victory
1983	Sherry Ramsey	United States	2:27:07	
1984	Sherry Ramsey	United States	2:56:51	Second victory
1985	Candace Cable-Brookes	United States	2:05:26	Course record, third victory
1986	Candace Cable-Brookes	United States	2:09:28	Fourth victory
1987	Candace Cable-Brookes	United States	2:19:55	Fifth victory
1988	Candace Cable-Brookes	United States	2:10:44	Sixth victory
1989	Connie Hansen	Denmark	1:50:06	Course record
1990	Jean Driscoll	United States	1:43:17	Course record
1991	Jean Driscoll	United States	1:42:42	Course record, second victory
1992	Jean Driscoll	United States	1:36:52	Course record, third victory
1993	Jean Driscoll	United States	1:34:50	Course record, fourth victory
1994	Jean Driscoll	United States	1:34:22	Course record, fifth victory
1995	Jean Driscoll	United States	1:40:42	Sixth victory
1996	Jean Driscoll	United States	1:52:56	Seventh victory
1997	Louise Sauvage	Australia	1:54:28	
1998	Louise Sauvage	Australia	1:41:19	Second victory
1999	Louise Sauvage	Australia	1:42:23	Third victory
2000	Jean Driscoll	United States	2:00:52	Eighth victory
2001	Louise Sauvage	Australia	1:53:54	Fourth victory
2002	Edith Hunkeler	Switzerland	1:45:57	
2003	Christina Ripp	United States	1:54:47	
2004	Cheri Blauwet	United States	1:39:53	
2005	Cheri Blauwet	United States	1:47:45	Second victory
2006	Edith Hunkeler	Switzerland	1:43:42	Second victory
2007	Wakako Tsuchida	Japan	1:53:30	
2008	Wakako Tsuchida	Japan	1:48:32	Second victory
2009	Wakako Tsuchida	Japan	1:54:37	Third victory
2010	Wakako Tsuchida	Japan	1:43:32	Fourth victory
2011	Wakako Tsuchida	Japan	1:34:06	Course record, fifth victory
2012	Shirley Reilly	United States	1:37:36	
2013	Tatyana McFadden	United States	1:45:25	
2014	Tatyana McFadden	United States	1:35:06	Second victory
2015	Tatyana McFadden	United States	1:52:54	Third victory
2016	Tatyana McFadden	United States	1:42:16	Fourth victory
2017	Manuela Schär	Switzerland	1:28:17	Current course record
2018	Tatyana McFadden	United States	2:04:39	Fifth victory
2019	Manuela Schär	Switzerland	1:34:19	Second victory
2020	Canceled due to the COVID-19 pandemic			
2021	Manuela Schär	Switzerland	1:35:21	Third victory
2022	Manuela Schär	Switzerland	1:41:08	Fourth victory
2023	Susannah Scaroni	United States	1:41:45	
2024	Eden Rainbow-Cooper	United Kingdom	1:35:11	
2025	Susannah Scaroni	United States	1:41:45	Second victory

=== Men's handcycle division ===
Winners: Men's handcycle division
Year	Winner	Country	Time	Notes	Refs
2017	Tom Davis	United States	0:58:36	Current course record	
2018	Tom Davis	United States	1:18:41	Second victory	
2019	Tom Davis	United States	1:01:22	Third victory	
2020	Canceled due to the COVID-19 pandemic				
2021	Zachary Stinson	United States	1:11:53		
2022	Alfredo de los Santos	United States	1:08:40		
2023	Zachary Stinson	United States	1:11:51	Second victory	
2024	Zachary Stinson	United States	1:04:46	Third victory	
2025	Alfredo de los Santos	United States	1:07:35	Second victory	

=== Women's handcycle division ===
Winners: Women's handcycle division
Year	Winner	Country	Time	Notes	Refs
2017	Michelle Love	United States	2:39:05	Only female handcyclist finisher	
2018	Alicia Dana	United States	1:40:22	Course record	
2019	Devann Murphy	United States	2:01:02		
2020	Canceled due to the COVID-19 pandemic				
2021	Wendy Larsen	United States	1:37:15	Course record	
2022	Wendy Larsen	United States	1:35:10	Course record, second victory	
2023	Alicia Dana	United States	1:18:15	Course record, second victory	
2024	Alicia Dana	United States	1:15:20	Current course record, third victory	
2025	JoAnn Outten-Kenton	United States	1:42:57		

== Victories by nationality ==
Updated through the 2025 edition

Victories by nationality
Country	Open division		Wheelchair division		Handcycle division		Total
Country	Men's	Women's	Men's	Women's	Men's	Women's	Total
United States	43	16	14	31	8	8	120
Kenya	26	17	0	0	0	0	43
Canada	15	1	4	0	0	0	20
Switzerland	0	0	15	6	0	0	21
Japan	9	0	3	5	0	0	17
Ethiopia	7	8	0	0	0	0	15
South Africa	0	0	10	0	0	0	10
Finland	8	0	0	0	0	0	8
Germany (Note: Since 1949, Bundesrepublik Deutschland (Federal Republic of Germany). All German athletes that won Boston during the era from 1945 to 1990 represented Bundesrepublik Deutschland, known colloquially as West Germany in English. The unified Germany remains officially Bundesrepublik Deutschland.)	1	5	0	0	0	0	6
Australia	1	0	0	4	0	0	5
Russia	0	4	0	0	0	0	4
United Kingdom	3	0	0	1	0	0	4
France	0	0	3	0	0	0	3
New Zealand	1	2	0	0	0	0	3
Portugal	0	3	0	0	0	0	3
South Korea	3	0	0	0	0	0	3
Belgium	2	0	0	0	0	0	2
Greece	2	0	0	0	0	0	2
Norway	0	2	0	0	0	0	2
Colombia	1	0	0	0	0	0	1
Denmark	0	0	0	1	0	0	1
Guatemala	1	0	0	0	0	0	1
Ireland	1	0	0	0	0	0	1
Italy	1	0	0	0	0	0	1
Poland	0	1	0	0	0	0	1
Sweden	1	0	0	0	0	0	1
Yugoslavia (Note: Athlete represented the former Yugoslavia, which is recognised as Serbia today.)	1	0	0	0	0	0	1
