= 2005 Boston Marathon =

Footrace in Boston, Massachusetts, USA

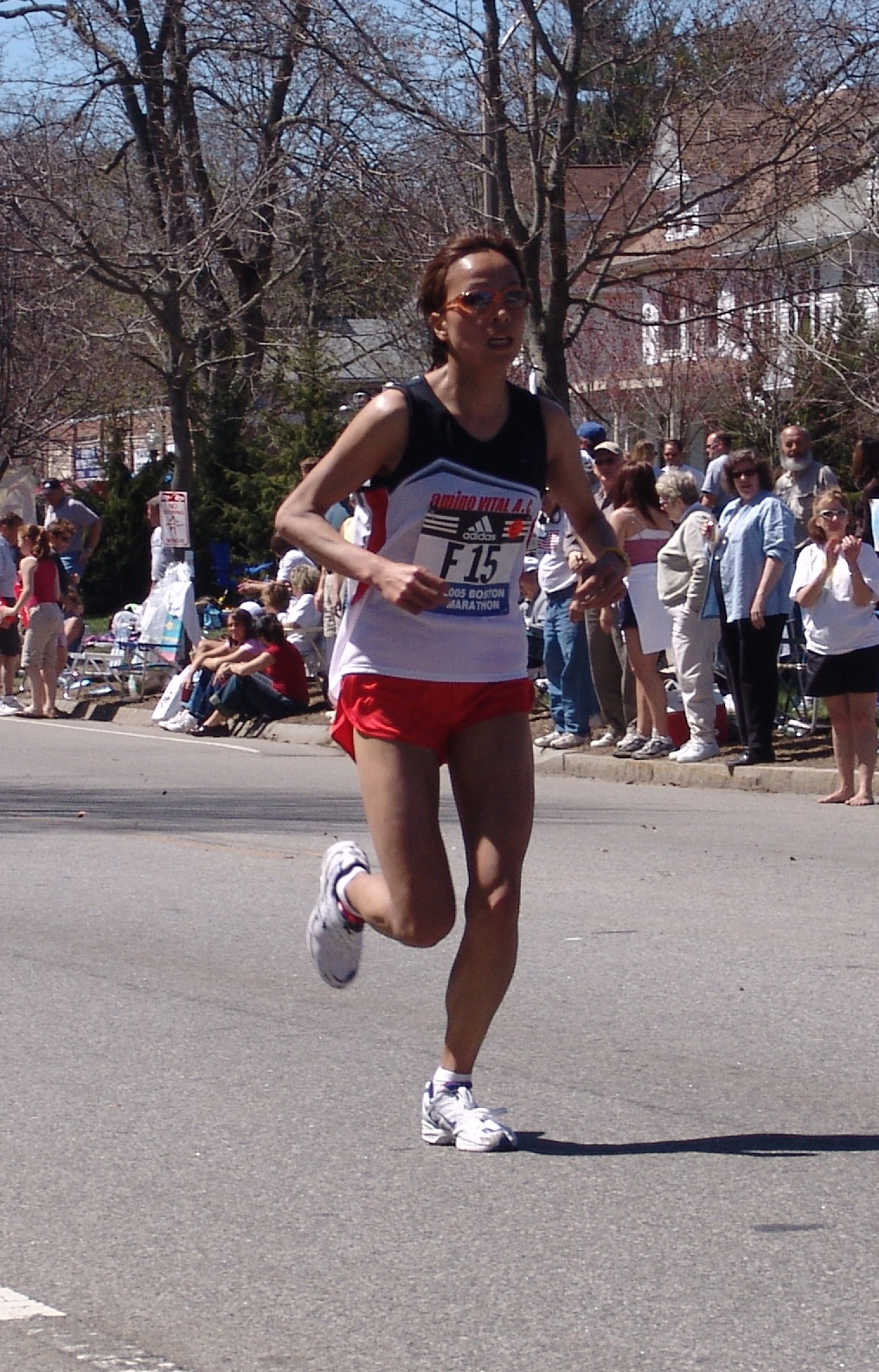
- Mina Ogawa during the race
- Venue: Boston, United States
- Dates: April 18

Champions
- Men: Hailu Negussie (2:11:45)
- Women: Catherine Ndereba (2:25:13)

The 2005 Boston Marathon was the 109th running of the annual marathon race in Boston, United States and was held on April 18. The elite men's race was won by Ethiopia's Hailu Negussie in a time of 2:11:45 hours and the women's race was won by Kenya's Catherine Ndereba in 2:25:13.

== Results ==
=== Men ===
Position	Athlete	Nationality	Time
1	Hailu Negussie	Ethiopia	2:11:45
2	Wilson Onsare	Kenya	2:12:21
3	Benson Kipchumba Cherono	Kenya	2:12:48
4	Alan Culpepper	United States	2:13:39
5	Robert Kipkoech Cheruiyot	Kenya	2:14:30
6	Timothy Cherigat	Kenya	2:15:19
7	Benjamin Kipchumba	Kenya	2:15:26
8	Andrew Letherby	Australia	2:16:38
9	Mohamed Ouaadi	France	2:16:41
10	Peter Gilmore	United States	2:17:32

=== Women ===
Position	Athlete	Nationality	Time
1	Catherine Ndereba	Kenya	2:25:13
2	Elfenesh Alemu	Ethiopia	2:29:51
3	Bruna Genovese	Italy	2:29:51
4	Svetlana Zakharova	Russia	2:31:34
5	Madina Biktagirova	Portugal	2:32:41
6	Lyubov Morgunova	Russia	2:33:24
7	Shitaye Gemechu	Ethiopia	2:33:51
8	Zhor El Kamch	Morocco	2:36:54
9	Mina Ogawa	Japan	2:37:34
10	Nuța Olaru	Romania	2:37:37
