= Viskari =

Viskari is a surname. Notable people with the surname include:

- Antti Viskari (1928–2007), Finnish long-distance runner
- Kalevi Viskari (1928–2018), Finnish gymnast
