= 2004 Boston Marathon =

Footrace in Boston, Massachusetts, USA

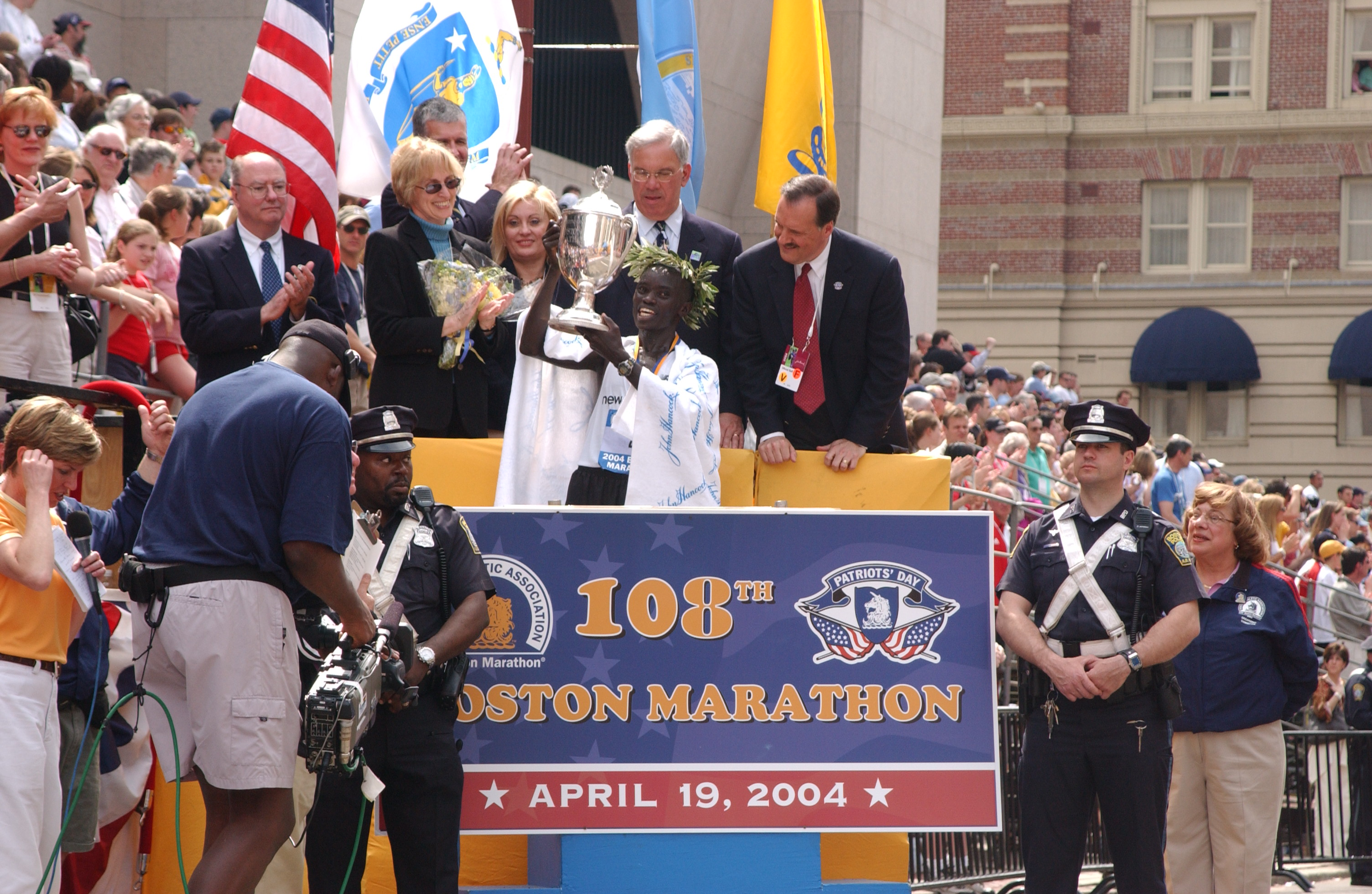
- Cherigat receiving the winner's trophy
- Venue: Boston, United States
- Dates: April 19

Champions
- Men: Timothy Cherigat (2:10:37)
- Women: Catherine Ndereba (2:24:27)

The 2004 Boston Marathon was the 108th running of the annual marathon race in Boston, United States and was held on April 19. The elite men's race was won by Kenya's Timothy Cherigat in a time of 2:11:45 hours and the women's race was won in 2:24:27 by Catherine Ndereba, also of Kenya.

== Results ==
=== Men ===
Position	Athlete	Nationality	Time
1	Timothy Cherigat	Kenya	2:10:37
2	Robert Cheboror	Kenya	2:11:49
3	Martin Lel	Kenya	2:13:38
4	Stephen Kiogora	Kenya	2:14:34
5	Hailu Negussie	Ethiopia	2:17:30
6	Benjamin Kimutai	Kenya	2:17:45
7	Joshua Kipkemboi	Kenya	2:18:23
8	Andrew Letherby	Australia	2:19:31
9	Fedor Ryzhov	Russia	2:21:24
10	Elly Rono	Kenya	2:22:45

=== Women ===
Position	Athlete	Nationality	Time
1	Catherine Ndereba	Kenya	2:24:27
2	Elfenesh Alemu	Ethiopia	2:24:43
3	Olivera Jevtić	Serbia and Montenegro	2:27:34
4	Jeļena Prokopčuka	Latvia	2:30:16
5	Nuța Olaru	Romania	2:30:44
6	Lyubov Denisova	Russia	2:31:17
7	Małgorzata Sobańska	Poland	2:32:23
8	Viktoriya Klimina	Russia	2:33:20
9	Ramilya Burangulova	Russia	2:34:08
10	Ai Yamamoto	Japan	2:34:32
