= 1998 Boston Marathon =

Footrace in Boston, Massachusetts, USA

2000 Boston Marathon
- Venue: Boston, United States
- Dates: April 20

Champions
- Men: Moses Tanui (2:07:34)
- Women: Fatuma Roba (2:23:21)

The 1998 Boston Marathon was the 102nd running of the annual marathon race in Boston, United States, which was held on April 20. The elite men's race was won by Kenya's Moses Tanui in a time of 2:07:34 hours and the women's race was won by Ethiopia's Fatuma Roba in 2:23:21.

== Results ==
=== Men ===
Position	Athlete	Nationality	Time
1st place, gold medalist(s)	Moses Tanui	Kenya	2:07:34
2nd place, silver medalist(s)	Joseph Chebet	Kenya	2:07:37
3rd place, bronze medalist(s)	Gert Thys	South Africa	2:07:52
4	André Luiz Ramos	Brazil	2:08:26
5	John Kagwe	Kenya	2:08:51
6	Germán Silva	Mexico	2:08:56
7	Alejandro Gómez	Spain	2:12:34
8	Tumo Turbo	Ethiopia	2:13:06
9	José Ramón Rodríguez	Spain	2:13:12
10	Takayuki Inubushi	Japan	2:13:15
11	Akinori Kuramata	Japan	2:13:53
12	Margarito Zamora	Mexico	2:14:05
13	Peter Ndirangu	Kenya	2:14:20
14	David Buzza	England	2:14:59
15	Andrey Kuznetzov	Russia	2:15:27

=== Women ===
Position	Athlete	Nationality	Time
1st place, gold medalist(s)	Fatuma Roba	Ethiopia	2:23:21
2nd place, silver medalist(s)	Renata Paradowska	Poland	2:27:17
3rd place, bronze medalist(s)	Anuța Cătună	Romania	2:27:34
4	Manuela Machado	Portugal	2:29:13
5	Colleen De Reuck	South Africa	2:29:43
6	Irina Kazakova	France	2:30:44
7	Jane Salumäe	Estonia	2:31:20
8	Hiroko Nomura	Japan	2:31:58
9	Irina Timofeyeva	Russia	2:32:32
10	Aurica Buia	Romania	2:34:17
11	Mary-Lynn Currier	United States	2:35:18
12	Libbie Hickman	United States	2:35:37
13	Fusai Okamoto	Japan	2:37:06
14	Cindy Keeler	United States	2:39:49
15	Yumiko Furuya	Japan	2:40:40
