= 2001 Boston Marathon =

Footrace in Boston, Massachusetts, USA

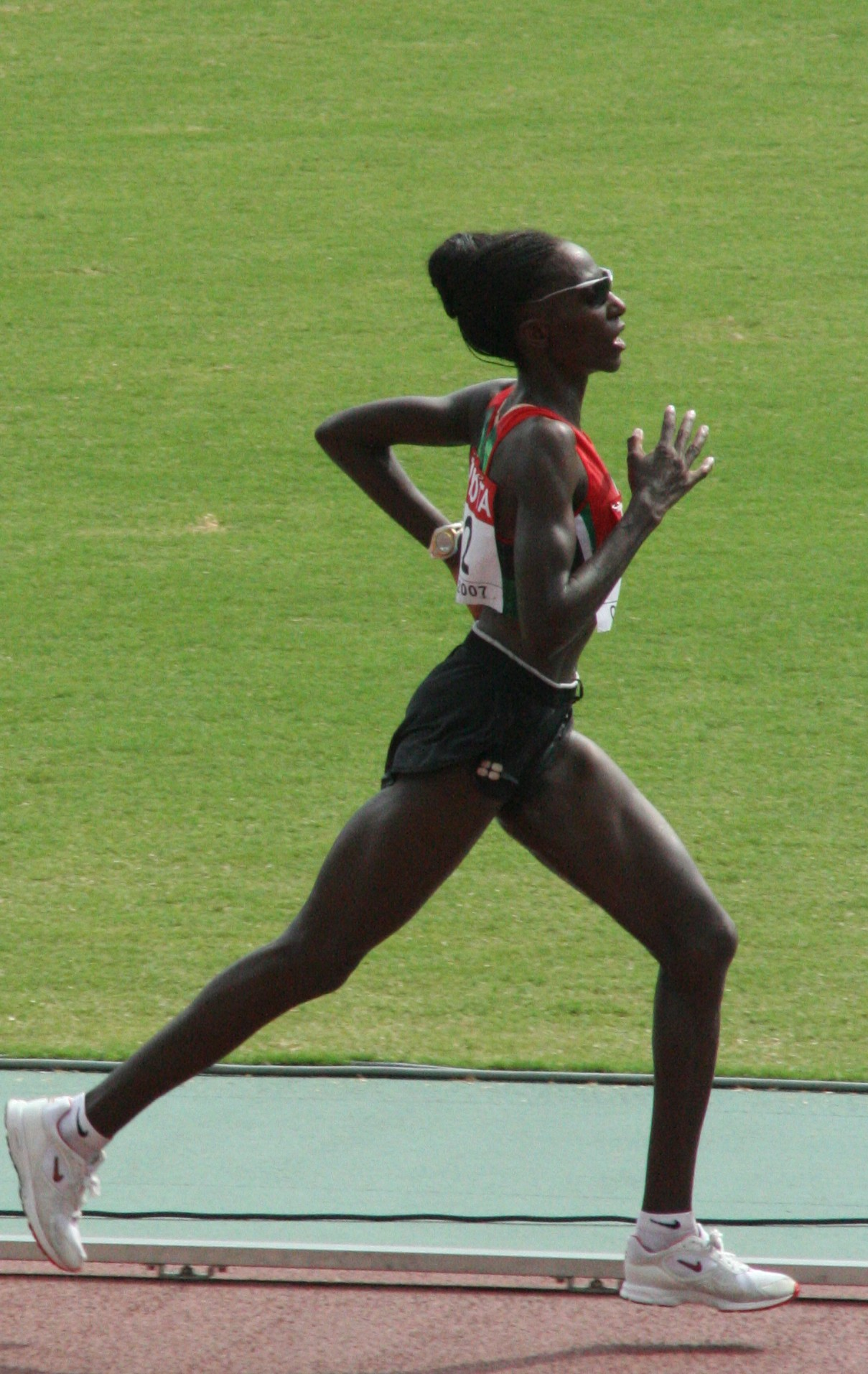
- Women's winner Catherine Ndereba
- Venue: Boston, United States
- Dates: April 16

Champions
- Men: Lee Bong-ju (2:09:43)
- Women: Catherine Ndereba (2:23:53)

The 2001 Boston Marathon was the 105th running of the annual marathon race in Boston, United States and was held on April 16. The elite men's race was won by South Korea's Lee Bong-ju in a time of 2:09:43 hours and the women's race was won by Kenya's Catherine Ndereba in 2:23:53.

A total of 13,395 people finished the race, 8586 men and 4809 women.

== Results ==
=== Men ===
Position	Athlete	Nationality	Time
1st place, gold medalist(s)	Lee Bong-ju	South Korea	2:09:43
2nd place, silver medalist(s)	Silvio Guerra	Ecuador	2:10:07
3rd place, bronze medalist(s)	Joshua Chelanga	Kenya	2:10:29
4	David Busenei	Kenya	2:11:47
5	Mbarak Hussein	Kenya	2:12:01
6	Rodney De Haven	United States	2:12:41
7	Laban Nkete	South Africa	2:12:44
8	Fedor Ryzhov	Russia	2:13:54
9	Makhosonke Fika	South Africa	2:14:13
10	Timothy Cherigat	Kenya	2:14:21
11	Joshua Kipkemboi	Kenya	2:14:47
12	Moses Tanui	Kenya	2:15:00
13	João N'Tyamba	Angola	2:16:00
14	Josh Cox	United States	2:16:17
15	Shem Kororia	Kenya	2:17:02

=== Women ===
Position	Athlete	Nationality	Time
1st place, gold medalist(s)	Catherine Ndereba	Kenya	2:23:53
2nd place, silver medalist(s)	Małgorzata Sobańska	Poland	2:26:42
3rd place, bronze medalist(s)	Lyubov Morgunova	Russia	2:27:18
4	Lornah Kiplagat	Kenya	2:27:56
5	Fatuma Roba	Ethiopia	2:28:08
6	Irina Timofeyeva	Russia	2:28:50
7	Lyudmila Petrova	Russia	2:29:23
8	Wei Yanan	China	2:29:52
9	Bruna Genovese	Italy	2:30:39
10	Kaori Tanabe	Japan	2:31:31
11	Albina Gallyamova	Russia	2:32:45
12	Zhang Shujing	China	2:33:43
13	Gitte Karlshøj	Denmark	2:36:36
14	Jill Boaz	United States	2:36:45
15	Susannah Beck	United States	2:37:12
