= 2003 Boston Marathon =

Footrace in Boston, Massachusetts, USA

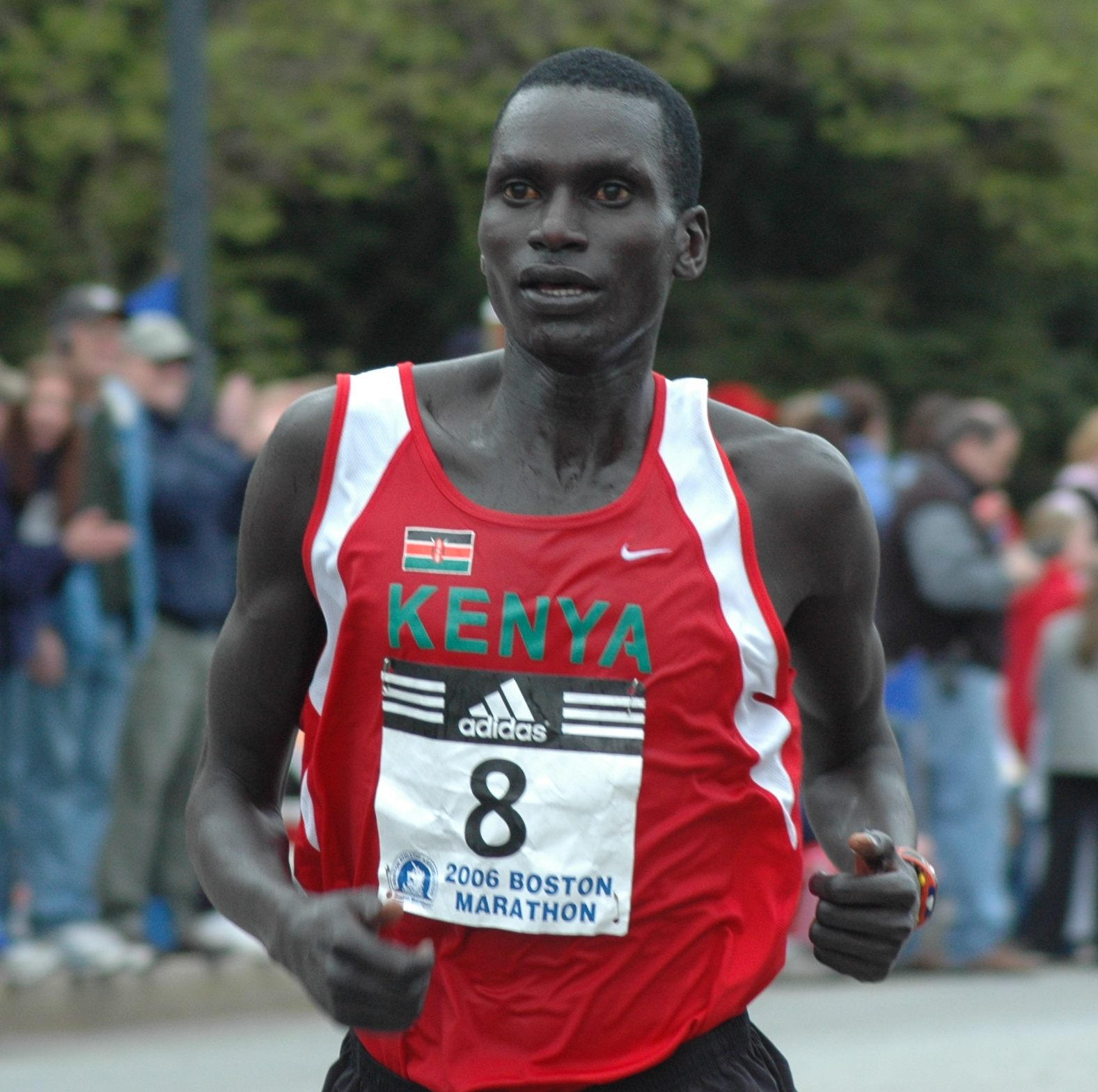
- Men's winner Robert Kipkoech Cheruiyot
- Venue: Boston, United States
- Dates: April 21

Champions
- Men: Robert Kipkoech Cheruiyot (2:10:11)
- Women: Svetlana Zakharova (2:25:20)

The 2003 Boston Marathon was the 107th running of the annual marathon race in Boston, United States and was held on April 21. The elite men's race was won by Kenya's Robert Kipkoech Cheruiyot in a time of 2:10:11 hours and the women's race was won by Russia's Svetlana Zakharova in 2:25:20.

== Results ==
=== Men ===
Position	Athlete	Nationality	Time
1st place, gold medalist(s)	Robert Kipkoech Cheruiyot	Kenya	2:10:11
2nd place, silver medalist(s)	Benjamin Kimutai	Kenya	2:10:34
3rd place, bronze medalist(s)	Martin Lel	Kenya	2:11:11
4	Timothy Cherigat	Kenya	2:11:28
5	Christopher Cheboiboch	Kenya	2:12:45
6	Fedor Ryzhov	Russia	2:15:29
7	Rodgers Rop	Kenya	2:16:14
8	David Busienei	Kenya	2:16:16
9	Elly Rono	Kenya	2:17:00
10	~~Eddy Hellebuyck~~	United States	~~2:17:18~~
11	Laban Kipkemboi	Kenya	2:17:50
12	Silvio Guerra	Ecuador	2:18:31
13	Karl Rasmussen	Norway	2:18:55
14	Salvatore Bettiol	Italy	2:22:06
15	Diego Colorado	Colombia	2:23:59
16	Wiesław Perszke	Poland	2:29:00
17	Gennadiy Temnikov	Russia	2:29:56
18	Ken Pliska	United States	2:30:12
19	Robert Dickie	United States	2:30:21
20	James Lander	United States	2:30:25

=== Women ===
Position	Athlete	Nationality	Time
1st place, gold medalist(s)	Svetlana Zakharova	Russia	2:25:20
2nd place, silver medalist(s)	Lyubov Denisova	Russia	2:26:51
3rd place, bronze medalist(s)	Joyce Chepchumba	Kenya	2:27:20
4	Margaret Okayo	Kenya	2:27:39
5	Marla Runyan	United States	2:30:28
6	Albina Mayorova	Russia	2:30:57
7	Firaya Sultanova-Zhdanova	Russia	2:31:30
8	Milena Glusac	United States	2:37:32
9	Jill Gaitenby	United States	2:38:19
10	Esther Kiplagat	Kenya	2:38:43
11	Gitte Karlshøj	Denmark	2:40:52
12	Emily Levan	United States	2:41:37
13	Alysun Deckert	United States	2:47:19
14	Maribel Burgos	Puerto Rico	2:48:03
15	Cori Mooney	United States	2:48:29
