= 1999 Boston Marathon =

Footrace in Boston, Massachusetts, USA

- Venue: Boston, United States
- Dates: April 19

Champions
- Men: Joseph Chebet (2:09:52)
- Women: Fatuma Roba (2:23:25)

The 1999 Boston Marathon was the 103rd running of the annual marathon race in Boston, United States, which was held on April 19. The elite men's race was won by Kenya's Joseph Chebet in a time of 2:09:52 hours and the women's race was won by Ethiopia's Fatuma Roba in 2:23:25.

== Results ==
=== Men ===
Position	Athlete	Nationality	Time
1st place, gold medalist(s)	Joseph Chebet	Kenya	2:09:52
2nd place, silver medalist(s)	Silvio Guerra	Ecuador	2:10:18
3rd place, bronze medalist(s)	Frank Pooe	South Africa	2:11:37
4	Abner Chipu	South Africa	2:12:46
5	John Kagwe	Kenya	2:13:57
6	Peter Githuka	Kenya	2:14:03
7	Andrey Kuznetsov	Russia	2:14:19
8	José Luis Molina	Costa Rica	2:14:26
9	Rubén Maza	Venezuela	2:14:40
10	Julius Ondieki	Kenya	2:15:27
11	Masaki Oya	Japan	2:15:45
12	Joshua Kipkemboi	Kenya	2:15:56
13	Joseph LeMay	United States	2:16:11
14	Franklin Tenorio	Ecuador	2:16:32
15	Luke Kibet Chebii	Kenya	2:17:50

=== Women ===
Position	Athlete	Nationality	Time
1st place, gold medalist(s)	Fatuma Roba	Ethiopia	2:23:25
2nd place, silver medalist(s)	Franziska Rochat-Moser	Switzerland	2:25:51
3rd place, bronze medalist(s)	Yuko Arimori	Japan	2:26:39
4	Colleen De Reuck	South Africa	2:27:54
5	Martha Tenorio	Ecuador	2:27:58
6	Catherine Ndereba	Kenya	2:28:27
7	Lyudmila Petrova	Russia	2:29:13
8	Mitsuko Hirose	Japan	2:30:34
9	Renata Paradowska	Poland	2:31:41
10	Anuța Cătună	Romania	2:33:49
11	Sun Yingjie	China	2:37:11
12	Lynn Jennings	United States	2:38:37
13	Julia Kirtland	United States	2:39:45
14	Josette Colomb	France	2:40:36
15	Danuta Bartoszek	Canada	2:43:18
