= Johnny Miles =

Canadian marathon runner

John Christopher Miles
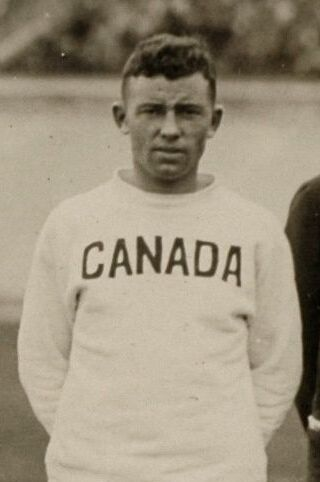
- Miles in 1928

Personal information
- Full name: John Christopher Miles
- Nicknames: Johnny, Jack
- Born: John Christopher Miles; October 30, 1905 Halifax, West Yorkshire, England
- Died: June 15, 2003 (aged 97) Hamilton, Ontario
- Height: 5' 6-1/2"
- Weight: 133 lb (60 kg)

Sport
- Country: Canada
- Coached by: John W. Miles

Achievements and titles
- Olympic finals: 1928 Summer Olympics; 1932 Summer Olympics
- National finals: 1925 Canadian 5-mile champion 1928 Canadian 10000m champion
Medal record
Men's Athletics
British Empire Games
Bronze medal – third place	1930 Hamilton	Marathon

John C. Miles, CM (October 30, 1905 – June 15, 2003) was a Canadian marathon runner. He won the Boston Marathon in 1926 and 1929.

== Early life ==
Born in Halifax, West Yorkshire, as a child he moved with his family to Florence, Nova Scotia, a coal town located near Sydney Mines on Cape Breton Island. When his father enlisted in the armed forces in 1916, at age 11 he helped to support his family by working in the coal mines during the evening shift and continuing at school during daytime. As a teenager he was coached by his father and won local races. He went on to win the Canadian five-mile (8 km) championship when it was held in Halifax in 1925. He also won the Halifax Herald 10-mile (16 km) competition in the same year. As a young man, Miles worked various temporary jobs, including a stint in northern Ontario. When he won the Halifax races, he was employed in a colliery blacksmith's shop. He was then offered employment with the British Canadian Cooperative Store. For them, Miles delivered groceries to local customers and country stores by horse and wagon. To stay in shape he would run behind the wagon wearing heavy boots.

== Boston Marathons ==
In 1926 Miles's neighbours raised a few hundred dollars to send him to the Boston Marathon by train. This would be Miles's debut marathon, having never run a race longer than 10 miles. The field at the 1926 Boston Marathon included four-time winner Clarence DeMar and 1924 Olympic champion Albin Stenroos, whom Miles idolized. Miles arrived at the marathon as an unknown, competing in a handmade singlet adorned with a maple leaf and the letters "NS" for Nova Scotia and a pair of 98-cent sneakers. Stenroos attempted to break away after the first few miles, leaving DeMar behind. Miles stayed with him until Heartbreak Hill, at which point he passed him. Miles completed the race in a time of 2:25:40. His time was so fast that the course was remeasured and found to be 176 yards short.

Miles attempted to defend his title at the 1927 Boston Marathon, but dropped out early due to problems with his shoes. In 1929 Miles returned to Boston and won the marathon in a time of 2:33:08. Miles competed in two more Boston Marathons, never finishing higher than 10th.

== Other competitions ==
Between his two wins in Boston, Miles won the Canadian 10000 metre championship in 1928. He later won a bronze medal in the marathon at the 1930 British Empire Games. He represented Canada at the 1928 Summer Olympics and finished 17th in the 1928 Olympic marathon. Four years later at the 1932 Summer Olympics he finished 14th in the Olympic marathon race.

== Later life ==
After the 1932 Olympics, Miles retired from competition. He had moved to Hamilton, Ontario in 1927 and, while training for the 1928 Olympics, he found work as a labourer for International Harvester. He subsequently worked for them as an inspector and foreman and then as a manager in France and in Chicago. He retired home to Canada in 1971. In 1982, he was made a Member of the Order of Canada. He was inducted into Canada's Sports Hall of Fame and the Nova Scotia Sports Hall of Fame. Miles died at age 97 in Hamilton, Ontario. At the time of his death, he was Canada's oldest living Olympic athlete and the oldest Boston Marathon winner.

In 2018 Miles was named by the Nova Scotia Sports Hall of Fame as one of the greatest 15 athletes in Nova Scotia's history, ranking seventh.

== Tributes ==
Since 1975 the Johnny Miles Marathon has been held in New Glasgow, Nova Scotia in his honour. An annual 5K race is also held in his honour in Sydney Mines, Nova Scotia. Sydney Mines also displays his image on a sign at the entrance of the town and a statue of Miles is displayed on Main St.

== See also ==
- List of winners of the Boston Marathon
