= 1985 Boston Marathon =

Footrace in Boston, Massachusetts, USA

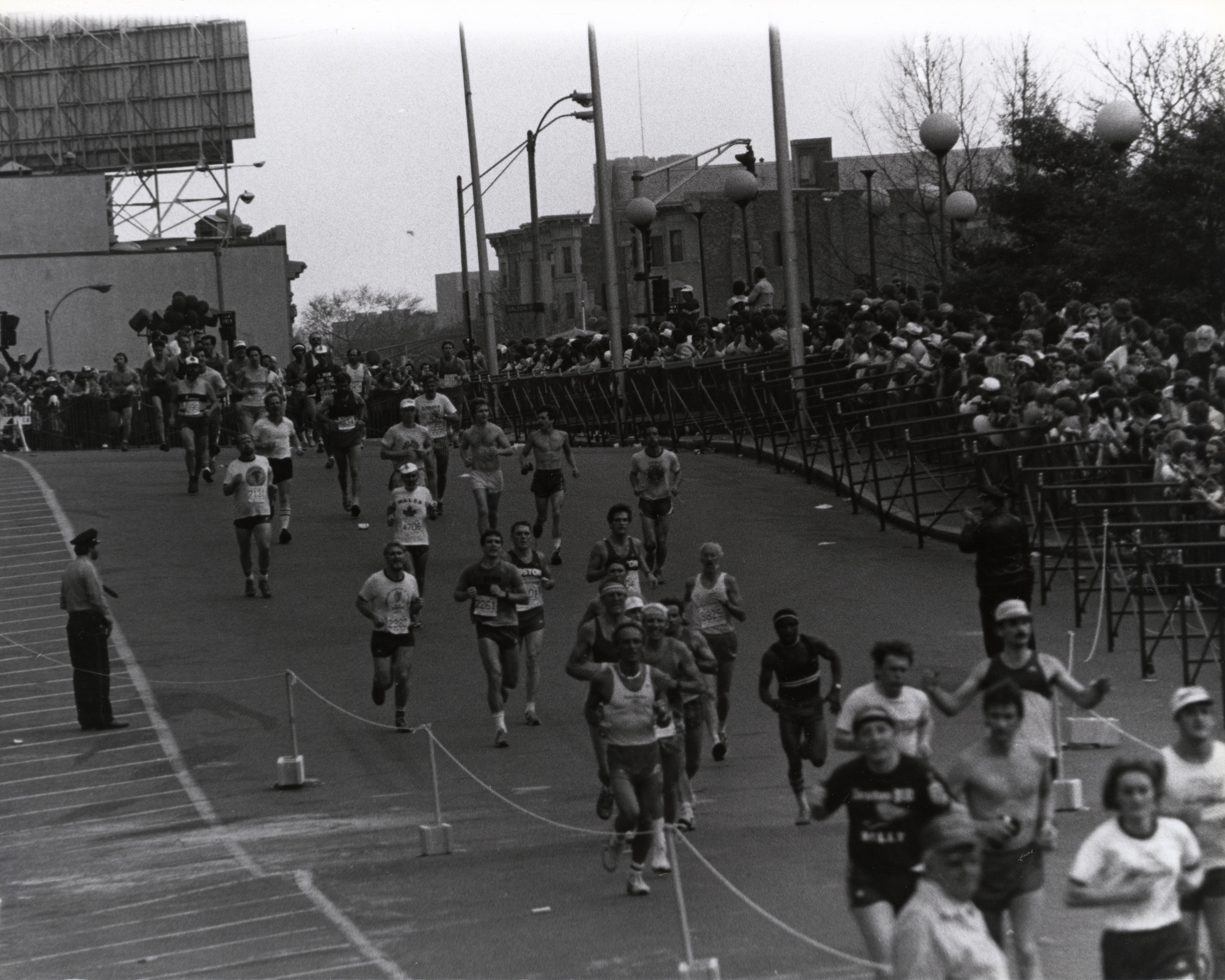
- Competitors running in the marathon
- Venue: Boston, United States
- Dates: April 15

Champions
- Men: Geoff Smith (2:14:05)
- Women: Lisa Rainsberger (2:34:06)
- Wheelchair men: George Murray (1:43:25)
- Wheelchair women: Candace Cable (2:05:26)

The 1985 Boston Marathon was the 89th running of the annual marathon race in Boston, United States, which was held on April 15. The elite men's race was won by Great Britain's Geoff Smith in a time of 2:14:05 hours and the women's race was won by American Lisa Rainsberger in 2:34:06. In the wheelchair race, George Murray of the United States won the men's race in 1:45:34 and Candace Cable of United States won the women's race in 2:05:26.

A total of 3931 runners finished the race, 3472 men and 459 women.

The elite field was of a lower standard than usual, given the lack of prize money on offer and it being the year after an Olympics. The men's and women's winners were by far the favourites for their races, Smith particularly so after the refusal to admit Mark Plaatjes into the race, as part of the international sporting boycott of South Africa during the apartheid era.

== Results ==
=== Men ===
Position	Athlete	Nationality	Time
1st place, gold medalist(s)	Geoff Smith	United Kingdom	2:14:05
2nd place, silver medalist(s)	Gary Tuttle	United States	2:19:11
3rd place, bronze medalist(s)	Mark Helgeson	United States	2:21:15
4	Lou Supino	United States	2:21:19
5	Robert Doyle	United States	2:21:31
6	Toru Mimura	Japan	2:23:35
7	Charles Hewes	United States	2:23:35
8	Dan Dillon	United States	2:23:50
9	Christopher Fletcher	United States	2:24:29
10	Norman Blair	United States	2:25:23
11	Randall Dyson	United States	2:25:36
12	Mark Amway	United States	2:26:22
13	Wayne Jacob	United States	2:26:59
14	Michael Slavin	United States	2:26:59
15	Stephen Grygiel	United States	2:27:04
16	Mark Lohman	United States	2:27:11
17	Peter Kanfer	United States	2:27:12
18	John Zupanc	United States	2:27:13
19	Joseph Worden	United States	2:27:20
20	Edwin Hurlow	United States	2:27:58
21	Michael Novelli	United States	2:28:23
22	Bob Clifford	United States	2:28:27
23	Patrick Corrigan	United States	2:28:33
24	Kevin Retelle	United States	2:28:36
25	Fred Schneck	United States	2:28:39

=== Women ===
Position	Athlete	Nationality	Time
1st place, gold medalist(s)	Lisa Rainsberger	United States	2:34:06
2nd place, silver medalist(s)	Lynne Huntington	United Kingdom	2:42:15
3rd place, bronze medalist(s)	Karen Dunn	United States	2:42:27
4	Deborah Butterfield	United States	2:43:47
5	Vickie Smith	United States	2:46:33
6	Kathleen Northrop	United States	2:46:43
7	Kimberly Moody	United States	2:46:51
8	Mary Hynes	United States	2:48:57
9	Elizabeth Bulman	United States	2:50:16
10	Beth Dillinger	United States	2:50:36
11	Patricia Hinson	United States	2:52:42
12	Susan Lupica	United States	2:53:33
13	Caryle Andrew	United States	2:53:35
14	Sherry Langlais	United States	2:55:34
15	Betty Hite	United States	2:55:38
16	Pauline Brown	New Zealand	2:56:08
17	Sally Zimmer	United States	2:56:53
18	Nancy Munroe	United States	2:58:19
19	Eileen Portz	United States	2:58:33
20	Melinda Ireland	United States	2:59:11
21	Lynne Walmer	United States	2:59:44
22	Kirsten Gilbert	United States	2:59:55
23	Elizabeth Brim	United States	3:00:51
24	Pamela Burke	United States	3:00:59
25	Doreen Mastalli	United States	3:01:14

=== Wheelchair men ===
Position	Athlete	Nationality	Time
1st place, gold medalist(s)	George Murray	United States	1:45:34
2nd place, silver medalist(s)	André Viger	Canada	1:47:23
3rd place, bronze medalist(s)	Jim Knaub	United States	1:48:44
4	Tom Foran	United States	1:50:09
5	Paul Phelan	United States	1:51:40
6	Ron Minor	United States	1:54:23
7	Jim Martinson	United States	1:55:20
8	Jim Tennigkeit	United States	1:57:18
9	John Rodolph	United States	2:01:18
10	Randy Snow	United States	2:04:12

=== Wheelchair women ===
Position	Athlete	Nationality	Time
1st place, gold medalist(s)	Candace Cable	United States	2:05:26
2nd place, silver medalist(s)	Angela Leriti	United States	2:21:11
3rd place, bronze medalist(s)	Amy Doofenbaker	United States	2:34:42
