= Keizo Yamada =

Japanese long-distance runner (1927–2020)

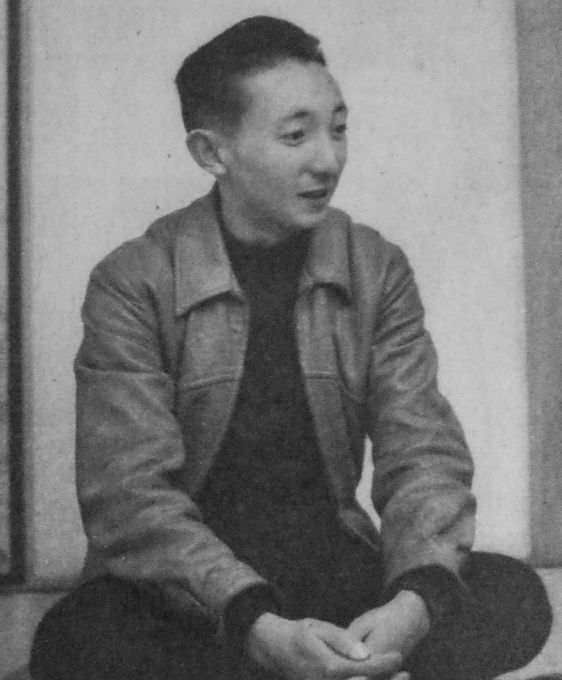

Keizo Yamada (山田 敬蔵, Yamada Keizō; January 30, 1927 – April 2, 2020) was a long-distance runner from Japan, who won the 1956 edition of the Fukuoka Marathon, clocking 2:25:15 on December 9, 1956. He represented his native country at the 1952 Summer Olympics, finishing in 26th place (2:38:11) and won the 1953 Boston Marathon. He retired on July 18, 2009. He was born in Odate, Akita.

== International competitions ==
Representing Japan
Year	Competition	Venue	Position	Notes	
1952	Olympic Games	Helsinki, Finland	26th	Marathon	2:38:11.2
1953	Boston Marathon	Boston, United States	1st	Marathon	2:18:51
1956	Fukuoka Marathon	Fukuoka, Japan	1st	Marathon	2:25:15
