= Jim Knaub =

American wheelchair athlete (1956–2024)

- Born: January 5, 1956; Corona, California, U.S.
- Died: November 17, 2024 (aged 68); Long Beach, California, U.S.
- Known for: Wheelchair racing

James William Knaub (January 5, 1956 – November 17, 2024) was an American professional wheelchair marathon athlete.

== Background ==
Knaub was born in Corona, California on January 5, 1956. He died in Long Beach, California on November 17, 2024, at the age of 68.

== Sport ==
Knaub was a pole vault competitor at Long Beach State and a semifinalist for the 1976 Olympics before a 1978 traffic accident left him paralyzed. He went through rehabilitation at Rancho Los Amigos National Rehabilitation Center, but did not regain the use of his legs. After setting a wheelchair marathon world record at the 1982 Boston Marathon, he went on to win four more times for a total of four world records, and, along with female champion Candace Cable, "gave the 'wheelies' a personality in the 1980s and early 1990s". In the 1990s he held "the world record in every race distance from 5,000 meters to the marathon."

== Other ventures ==
Knaub joined Cannondale Bicycle Corporation in 1998 as production manager for the company's competition wheelchairs.

Jim Knaub appeared as an actor in television (The A Team, The Fall Guy, The Love Boat S6 E7 as Arthur (1982), and others) and movies.

In 2013, it was reported that a film about Knaub's life, titled Hell on Wheels, was in development by Walt Disney Pictures.

== Accolades ==
- Lakewood, California Youth Hall of Fame, 1981
- Long Beach State Hall of Fame, 1990

== See also ==
- List of winners of the Boston Marathon#Men's wheelchair division
- Los Angeles Marathon § Top finishers
