= 1993 Boston Marathon =

Footrace in Boston, Massachusetts, USA

- Venue: Boston, United States
- Dates: April 19

Champions
- Men: Cosmas Ndeti (2:09:33)
- Women: Olga Markova (2:25:27)

The 1993 Boston Marathon was the 97th running of the annual marathon race in Boston, United States, which was held on April 19. The elite men's race was won by Kenya's Cosmas Ndeti in a time of 2:09:33 hours and the women's race was won by Russia's Olga Markova in 2:25:27.

== Results ==
=== Men ===
| Position | Athlete | Nationality | Time |
|---|---|---|---|
| 1st place, gold medalist(s) | Cosmas Ndeti | Kenya | 2:09:33 |
| 2nd place, silver medalist(s) | Kim Jae-ryong | South Korea | 2:09:43 |
| 3rd place, bronze medalist(s) | Luketz Swartbooi | Namibia | 2:09:57 |
| 4 | Hiromi Taniguchi | Japan | 2:11:02 |
| 5 | Sammy Lelei | Kenya | 2:12:12 |
| 6 | Mark Plaatjes | South Africa | 2:12:39 |
| 7 | Boniface Merande | Kenya | 2:12:50 |
| 8 | Severino Bernardini | Italy | 2:12:56 |
| 9 | Keith Brantly | United States | 2:12:58 |
| 10 | Carlos Tarazona | Venezuela | 2:13:37 |
| 11 | Sam Nyangincha | Kenya | 2:14:23 |
| 12 | Andy Ronan | Ireland | 2:14:58 |
| 13 | Andrés Espinosa | Mexico | 2:15:12 |
| 14 | Xolile Yawa | South Africa | 2:15:28 |
| 15 | Steve Jones | United Kingdom | 2:15:30 |

=== Women ===
| Position | Athlete | Nationality | Time |
|---|---|---|---|
| 1st place, gold medalist(s) | Olga Markova | Russia | 2:25:27 |
| 2nd place, silver medalist(s) | Kim Jones | United States | 2:30:00 |
| 3rd place, bronze medalist(s) | Carmem de Oliveira | Brazil | 2:31:18 |
| 4 | Manuela Machado | Portugal | 2:32:20 |
| 5 | Albina Gallyamova | Russia | 2:35:12 |
| 6 | Joan Benoit | United States | 2:35:43 |
| 7 | Nadia Prasad | New Caledonia | 2:37:11 |
| 8 | Tatyana Titova | Russia | 2:37:42 |
| 9 | Joy Smith | United States | 2:38:35 |
| 10 | Gabrielle O'Rourke | New Zealand | 2:39:09 |
| 11 | Jane Welzel | United States | 2:39:38 |
| 12 | Irina Bogacheva | Kyrgyzstan | 2:41:09 |
| 13 | Bernardine Portenski | New Zealand | 2:41:18 |
| 14 | Lutsia Belyayeva | Russia | 2:43:06 |
| 15 | Irina Bondarchuk | Russia | 2:43:15 |
