= Hailu Negussie =

Ethiopian long-distance runner

Personal information
- Born: April 16, 1978 (age 48)

Sport
- Country: Ethiopia
- Sport: Long-distance running

Hailu Negussie (born April 16, 1978) is an Ethiopian marathon runner who won the 109th Boston Marathon in 2005. He finished with a time of 2:11:45 and became the first Ethiopian to win the Boston Marathon since Abebe Mekonnen won the race in 1989. His personal best for the marathon is 2:08:16.

Negussie tried to defend his Boston title in 2006. However, he dropped out of the race just past the halfway point. Kenyan Robert Kipkoech Cheruiyot broke the course record that year. Negussie has also won the Hofu Marathon in 2002 (with a personal best time of 2:08:16) and the Xiamen Marathon (with a time of 2:09:03) in 2003. He also finished fifth in the 2003 Fukuoka Marathon and second in the 2002 Hamburg Marathon.

== Achievements ==
Year	Competition	Venue	Position	Event	Notes
Representing Ethiopia
2000	Shanghai Marathon	Shanghai, China	1st	Marathon	2:18:17
2003	Xiamen International Marathon	Xiamen, China	1st	Marathon	2:09:03
2004	Olympic Games	Athens, Greece	—	Marathon	DNF
2005	Boston Marathon	Boston, United States	1st	Marathon	2:11:44

== See also ==
- List of winners of the Boston Marathon
