= Antti Viskari =

Finnish long-distance runner

Antti Viskari (born 1 May 1928 in Joutseno, Lappeenranta, Etelä-Karjala, Finland; died 4 June 2007) was a Finnish former long-distance runner. He had a personal best for the marathon of 2:21:27, which he set in 1960. Viskari competed in the marathon at the 1960 Summer Olympics in Rome, placing 53rd. He won the 1956 Boston Marathon on a course found to be short. He died in Finland in 2007.
