= Joseph Chebet =

Kenyan long-distance runner (1970–2023)

Joseph Chebet (23 August 1970 – 7 July 2023) was a Kenyan long-distance runner who was the winner of the 1999 Boston Marathon and the 1999 New York Marathon. He won in Boston in 1999 after losing to fellow Kenyan Moses Tanui the year before by only three seconds.

== Personal life ==
Chebet was born in Kapyego, Elgeyo Marakwet County before relocating to Kiptoi, Trans Nzoia County. His running talent was discovered in the early 1990s.

After his retirement from running, Chebet took up maize farming in the region he was born in.

According to his brother, Chebet died on 7 July 2023, at the age of 52, after being hospitalized for three days in Eldoret following a short illness. He had been additionally struggling with a pancreatic disease for three months.

== Achievements ==
- All results regarding marathon, unless stated otherwise

Year	Competition	Venue	Position	Notes
Representing Kenya
1996	Amsterdam Marathon	Amsterdam, Netherlands	1st	2:10:57
1999	Boston Marathon	Boston, United States	1st	2:09:52
1999	New York City Marathon	New York, United States	1st	2:09:14
2003	Vienna Marathon	Vienna, Austria	1st	2:14:49

== Other notable performances ==
- Chebet won the Amsterdam Marathon in 1996
- Chebet won the Torino Marathon in 1997.
- His best marathon time was his 2nd place loss to Tanui when he ran 2:07:37 at Boston in 1998.
- 1998 was a tough year for Chebet. He lost not only the Boston Marathon by three seconds, but also lost the New York Marathon by three seconds to John Kagwe.

== See also ==
- List of winners of the Boston Marathon
- List of winners of the New York City Marathon
