= Timothy Cherigat =

Kenyan long-distance runner

Timothy Cherigat (born December 29, 1976, in Chepkorio) is a long-distance runner from Kenya, who was the winner of the 108th Boston Marathon held in 2004. Cherigat won this race in a time of 2:10:37 on an abnormally warm day during which temperatures reached as high as 87 °F (30 °C).

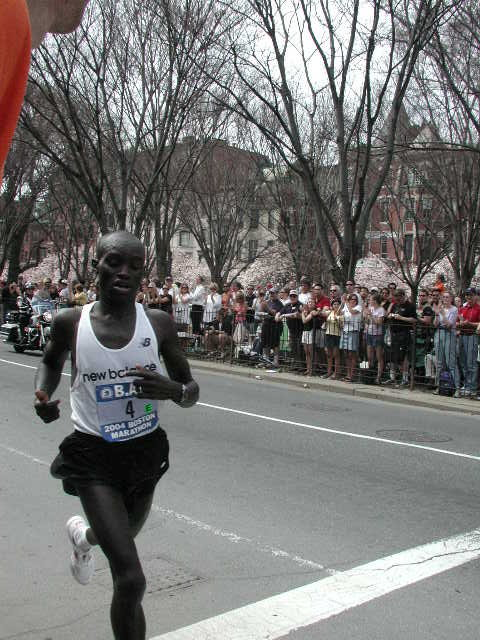
Timothy Cherigat approaching victory at the 2004 Boston Marathon.

== Other Notable Races ==
In addition to his Boston victory, Cherigat has a personal best of 2:09:34, which he attained while winning the San Sebastian Marathon in 2002. He also placed 3rd at the New York City Marathon in 2004. He has a few top ten finishes in the major U.S. marathons of Chicago, New York, and Boston but has yet to duplicate the success that he had in winning Boston in 2004. Although conditions were much cooler in 2005 and 2006, Cherigat ran several minutes slower than his 2004 time during both of these years.

== Achievements ==
- All results regarding marathon, unless stated otherwise

Year	Competition	Venue	Position	Notes
Representing Kenya
2004	Boston Marathon	Boston, United States	1st	2:10:37

== See also ==
- List of winners of the Boston Marathon
