= 2003 New York City Marathon =

Footrace held in New York City

34th New York City Marathon
- Location: New York City, New York
- Date: November 2

Champions
- Men: Martin Lel (2:10:30)
- Women: Margaret Okayo (2:22:31)
- Wheelchair men: Krige Schabort (1:32:19)
- Wheelchair women: Cheri Blauwet (1:53:27)

The 2003 New York City Marathon was the 34th running of the annual marathon race in New York City, New York, which took place on Sunday, November 2. The men's elite race was won by Kenya's Martin Lel in a time of 2:10:30 hours while the women's race was won in 2:22:31 by Margaret Okayo, also of Kenya.

In the wheelchair races, South Africa's Krige Schabort (1:32:19) and America's Cheri Blauwet (1:59:30) won the men's and women's divisions, respectively. In the handcycle race, Dutchman John Vink (1:33:08) and America's Helene Hines (1:49:13) were the winners.

A total of 34,729 runners finished the race, 23,014 men and 11,715 women.

== Results ==
=== Men ===
Position	Athlete	Nationality	Time
1st place, gold medalist(s)	Martin Lel	Kenya	2:10:30
2nd place, silver medalist(s)	Rodgers Rop	Kenya	2:11:11
3rd place, bronze medalist(s)	Christopher Cheboiboch	Kenya	2:11:23
4	Elly Rono	Kenya	2:11:31
5	Alberico Di Cecco	Italy	2:11:40
6	Ottaviano Andriani	Italy	2:13:10
7	David Makori	Kenya	2:13:20
8	Laban Kipkemboi	Kenya	2:13:55
9	John Kagwe	Kenya	2:14:08
10	Elarbi Khattabi	Morocco	2:15:10
11	Timothy Cherigat	Kenya	2:15:57
12	Vito Sardella	Italy	2:16:10
13	Raymond Kipkoech	Kenya	2:16:16
14	Gert Thys	South Africa	2:16:49
15	Augustus Kavutu	Kenya	2:18:30
16	Andrey Gordayev	Belarus	2:18:38
17	Matt Downin	United States	2:18:48
18	Jackson Kipngok	Kenya	2:18:55
19	Ulrich Steidl	Germany	2:19:18
20	Vincenzo Modica	Italy	2:19:53
—	Joseph Kariuki	Kenya	DNF
—	Godfrey Kiprotich	Kenya	DNF
—	António Sousa	Portugal	DNF
—	Julio Rey	Spain	DNF
—	Retta Feyissa	Ethiopia	DNF
—	José Alejandro Semprún	Venezuela	DNF
—	Paul Mwangi	Kenya	DNF
—	Juan Camacho	Mexico	DNF
—	Stephen Cheptot	Kenya	DNF
—	Laban Chege	Kenya	DNF

=== Women ===
Position	Athlete	Nationality	Time
1st place, gold medalist(s)	Margaret Okayo	Kenya	2:22:31
2nd place, silver medalist(s)	Catherine Ndereba	Kenya	2:23:03
3rd place, bronze medalist(s)	Lornah Kiplagat	Netherlands	2:23:43
4	Lyudmila Petrova	Russia	2:25:00
5	Lyubov Denisova	Russia	2:25:58
6	Joyce Chepchumba	Kenya	2:26:06
7	Susan Chepkemei	Kenya	2:29:05
8	Adriana Fernández	Mexico	2:32:09
9	Olivera Jevtić	Serbia and Montenegro	2:32:29
10	Sylvia Mosqueda	United States	2:33:10
11	Firiya Sultanova	Russia	2:33:57
12	Helena Javornik	Slovenia	2:35:07
13	Nataliya Berkut	Ukraine	2:35:23
14	Esther Kiplagat	Kenya	2:35:58
15	Gladys Asiba	Kenya	2:37:47
16	Jenny Crain	United States	2:38:49
17	Jennifer Rhines	United States	2:43:01
18	Sandy Jacobson	Canada	2:44:54
19	Deborah Toniolo	Italy	2:45:08
20	Marla Runyan	United States	2:45:12
—	Lyudmila Korchagina	Russia	DNF
—	Magdalena Boulet	United States	DNF
—	Dorota Gruca	Poland	DNF
—	Anita Håkenstad	Norway	DNF
—	Deena Kastor	United States	DNF
—	Leah Malot	Kenya	DNF
—	Olga Romanova	Russia	DNF

=== Wheelchair men ===
Position	Athlete	Nationality	Time
1st place, gold medalist(s)	Krige Schabort	South Africa	1:32:19
2nd place, silver medalist(s)	Ernst van Dyk	South Africa	1:35:36
3rd place, bronze medalist(s)	Saúl Mendoza	United States	1:35:37
4	Kelly Smith	Canada	1:36:17
5	Scot Hollonbeck	United States	1:42:19
6	Jun Hiromichi	Japan	1:46:04
7	Tyler Byers	United States	1:46:12
8	Adam Bleakney	United States	1:47:27
9	Paul Nunnari	Australia	1:51:51
10	Enzo Masiello	Italy	1:56:23

=== Wheelchair women ===
Position	Athlete	Nationality	Time
1st place, gold medalist(s)	Cheri Blauwet	United States	1:59:30
2nd place, silver medalist(s)	Christina Ripp	United States	2:00:05
3rd place, bronze medalist(s)	Diane Roy	Canada	2:04:29
4	Francesca Porcellato	Italy	2:06:50
5	Miriam Nibley	United States	2:06:54
6	Chantal Petitclerc	Canada	2:17:20
7	Candace Cable	United States	2:17:53
8	April Coughlin	United States	2:26:24
9	Melody Williamson	United States	3:24:35
10	Nikki Tinsley	United States	3:51:04

=== Handcycle men ===
Position	Athlete	Nationality	Time
1st place, gold medalist(s)	John Vink	Netherlands	1:33:08
2nd place, silver medalist(s)	Bogdan Krol	Poland	1:33:08
3rd place, bronze medalist(s)	Ronnie Pulliam	United States	1:40:19
4	Ermenegildo Arnoldi	Italy	1:40:24
5	Jack Beaulieu	United States	1:40:27

=== Handcycle women ===
Position	Athlete	Nationality	Time
1st place, gold medalist(s)	Helene Hines	United States	1:49:13
2nd place, silver medalist(s)	Daniela Rota	Italy	2:03:09
3rd place, bronze medalist(s)	Graziella Calimero	Italy	2:31:15
4	Graciela Ramirez	Mexico	3:11:12
5	Irene Hecht	United States	4:25:07
