= 2000 New York City Marathon =

Footrace held in New York City

31st New York City Marathon
- Location: New York City, New York
- Date: November 5

Champions
- Men: Abdelkader El Mouaziz (2:10:09)
- Women: Lyudmila Petrova (2:25:45)
- Wheelchair men: Kamel Ayari (1:53:50)
- Wheelchair women: Anh Nguyen Thi Xuan (2:46:47)

The 2000 New York City Marathon was the 31st running of the annual marathon race in New York City, New York, which took place on Sunday, November 5. The men's elite race was won by Morocco's Abdelkader El Mouaziz in a time of 2:10:09 hours while the women's race was won by Russia's Lyudmila Petrova in 2:25:45.

For the first time, disabled athletes were included in the New York Marathon with the introduction of official categories for wheelchairs and handcycles. In the wheelchair races, Tunisia's Kamel Ayari (1:53:50) and Vietnam's Anh Nguyen Thi Xuan (2:46:47) won the men's and women's divisions, respectively. In the handcycle race, Americans Joseph Dowling (1:54:25) and Helene Hines (1:57:27) were the winners.

A total of 29,327 runners finished the race, 21,015 men and 8312 women.

== Results ==
=== Men ===
| Position | Athlete | Nationality | Time |
|---|---|---|---|
| 1st place, gold medalist(s) | Abdelkader El Mouaziz | Morocco | 2:10:09 |
| 2nd place, silver medalist(s) | Japhet Kosgei | Kenya | 2:12:30 |
| 3rd place, bronze medalist(s) | Shem Kororia | Kenya | 2:12:33 |
| 4 | Elijah Korir | Kenya | 2:13:00 |
| 5 | Abraham Assefa | Ethiopia | 2:13:16 |
| 6 | Josia Thugwane | South Africa | 2:15:25 |
| 7 | Yasuaki Yamamoto | Japan | 2:15:37 |
| 8 | Simon Bor | Kenya | 2:16:23 |
| 9 | Mathias Ntawulikura | Rwanda | 2:16:26 |
| 10 | John Kagwe | Kenya | 2:17:02 |
| 11 | Kōji Shimizu | Japan | 2:18:55 |
| 12 | Shadrack Hoff | South Africa | 2:18:57 |
| 13 | Marco Orsi | Italy | 2:20:09 |
| 14 | Germán Silva | Mexico | 2:20:41 |
| 15 | Joseph Mereng | Kenya | 2:20:54 |
| 16 | Ben Kimondiu | Kenya | 2:21:27 |
| 17 | Sam Ngatia | Kenya | 2:22:58 |
| 18 | Chris Verbeeck | Belgium | 2:23:14 |
| 19 | Paul Pilkington | United States | 2:23:33 |
| 20 | Fabien Manzanares | France | 2:23:35 |
| — | Joseph Kariuki | Kenya | DNF |
| — | Noah Bor | Kenya | DNF |
| — | Diamantino dos Santos | Brazil | DNF |
| — | Mostafa El Damaoui | Morocco | DNF |
| — | Leonid Shvetsov | Russia | DNF |
| — | James Kariuki | Kenya | DNF |
| — | Simon Mphulanyane | South Africa | DNF |
| — | Belaye Wolashe | Ethiopia | DNF |
| — | Abner Chipu | South Africa | DNF |
| — | Simon Morolong | South Africa | DNF |
| — | Dionicio Cerón | Mexico | DNF |
| — | Róbert Štefko | Slovakia | DNF |
| — | Daniel Lopes Ferreira | Brazil | DNF |
| — | Boaz Kimaiyo | Kenya | DNF |

=== Women ===
| Position | Athlete | Nationality | Time |
|---|---|---|---|
| 1st place, gold medalist(s) | Lyudmila Petrova | Russia | 2:25:45 |
| 2nd place, silver medalist(s) | Franca Fiacconi | Italy | 2:26:03 |
| 3rd place, bronze medalist(s) | Margaret Okayo | Kenya | 2:26:36 |
| 4 | Hellen Jemaiyo Kimutai | Kenya | 2:26:42 |
| 5 | Florence Barsosio | Kenya | 2:27:00 |
| 6 | Tegla Loroupe | Kenya | 2:29:35 |
| 7 | Sun Yingjie | China | 2:30:13 |
| 8 | Kerryn McCann | Australia | 2:30:39 |
| 9 | Esther Kiplagat | Kenya | 2:30:52 |
| 10 | Yuko Arimori | Japan | 2:31:12 |
| 11 | Hellen Kimaiyo | Kenya | 2:32:11 |
| 12 | Svetlana Zakharova | Russia | 2:32:35 |
| 13 | Adriana Fernández | Mexico | 2:35:20 |
| 14 | Silvana Trampuz | Australia | 2:37:02 |
| 15 | Zofia Wieciorkowska | Poland | 2:43:09 |
| 16 | Gordon Bakoulis | United States | 2:45:17 |
| 17 | Dorian Meyer | United States | 2:45:53 |
| 18 | Kari-Anne Bertrand | United States | 2:47:45 |
| 19 | Gillian Horovitz | United Kingdom | 2:48:17 |
| 20 | Kelly Liljeblad | United States | 2:48:19 |
| — | Anuța Cătună | Romania | DNF |

=== Wheelchair men ===
| Position | Athlete | Nationality | Time |
|---|---|---|---|
| 1st place, gold medalist(s) | Kamel Ayari | Tunisia | 1:53:50 |
| 2nd place, silver medalist(s) | Tony Nogueira | United States | 1:57:33 |
| 3rd place, bronze medalist(s) | Bogdan Krol | Poland | 2:06:45 |
| 4 | Charles Sanchez | Ecuador | 2:11:09 |
| 5 | Iranilson da Silva | Brazil | 2:23:13 |
| 6 | Rob Loughlin | United States | 2:33:25 |
| 7 | Carlos Guzman | United States | 2:34:14 |
| 8 | Angel Quevedo | Ecuador | 2:35:17 |
| 9 | Enrico Guerini | Italy | 2:36:37 |
| 10 | Miroslav Legin | Bosnia and Herzegovina | 2:38:47 |

=== Wheelchair women ===
| Position | Athlete | Nationality | Time |
|---|---|---|---|
| 1st place, gold medalist(s) | Jo-Ann O'Callaghan | New Zealand | 3:47:26 |
| 2nd place, silver medalist(s) | Sylvia Grant | Jamaica | 4:37:44 |
| 3rd place, bronze medalist(s) | Kaeti Rigarlsford | New Zealand | 5:35:33 |
| 4 | Helga Thorsen | Norway | 7:32:54 |
| 5 | Sidette Warren | United States | 7:35:23 |
| 6 | Jolana Skalova | Slovakia | 7:51:21 |
| 7 | Denise Conyers | United States | 8:04:21 |

=== Handcycle men ===
| Position | Athlete | Nationality | Time |
|---|---|---|---|
| 1st place, gold medalist(s) | Joseph Dowling | United States | 1:54:25 |
| 2nd place, silver medalist(s) | John Paul Reiches | United States | 2:06:44 |
| 3rd place, bronze medalist(s) | Martin Dropplemann | Germany | 2:08:46 |
| 4 | Todd Philpott | Australia | 2:08:55 |
| 5 | Marshall Edwards | United States | 2:09:29 |

=== Handcycle women ===
| Position | Athlete | Nationality | Time |
|---|---|---|---|
| 1st place, gold medalist(s) | Helene Hines | United States | 1:57:27 |
| 2nd place, silver medalist(s) | Diane Rakiecki | Canada | 2:24:43 |
| 3rd place, bronze medalist(s) | Kirsty Digger | United States | 2:36:36 |
| 4 | Isabel Bohn | United States | 3:29:41 |
| 5 | Graciela Ramirez | Mexico | 3:44:47 |
