= 2001 New York City Marathon =

32nd New York City Marathon
- Location: New York City, New York
- Date: November 4

Champions
- Men: Tesfaye Jifar (2:07:43)
- Women: Margaret Okayo (2:24:21)
- Wheelchair men: Saúl Mendoza (1:39:25)
- Wheelchair women: Francesca Porcellato (2:11:57)

The 2001 New York City Marathon was the 32nd running of the annual marathon race in New York City, New York, which took place on Sunday, November 4. The men's elite race was won by Ethiopia's Tesfaye Jifar in a time of 2:07:43 hours while the women's race was won in 2:24:21 by Kenya's Margaret Okayo. Both these times were race records. Tesfaye Jifar was the first Ethiopian to win in New York and Okayo was the second Kenyan to win the women's race (after Tegla Loroupe).

In the wheelchair races, America's Saúl Mendoza (1:39:25) and Italy's Francesca Porcellato (2:11:57) won the men's and women's divisions, respectively. In the handcycle race, Israel's Ziv Bar-Shira (1:27:49) and America's Helene Hines (1:46:22) were the winners.

A total of 23,648 runners finished the race, 16,810 men and 6838 women.

The race was held in the wake of the September 11 attacks, thus the course was altered and mass participation was significantly down on previous years. Around 2800 police officers were present to ensure security, a no-fly zone was instituted above the race route, and runners were discouraged from accepting water from spectators on the route. The race adopted the slogan "United We Run" and the city's mayor, Rudy Giuliani, was given the number 1 bib, which is typically reserved for the men's defending champion.

== Results ==
=== Men ===
Position	Athlete	Nationality	Time
1st place, gold medalist(s)	Tesfaye Jifar	Ethiopia	2:07:43
2nd place, silver medalist(s)	Japhet Kosgei	Kenya	2:09:19
3rd place, bronze medalist(s)	Rodgers Rop	Kenya	2:09:51
4	Silvio Guerra	Ecuador	2:10:36
5	Hendrick Ramaala	South Africa	2:11:18
6	Jon Brown	United Kingdom	2:11:24
7	John Kagwe	Kenya	2:11:57
8	Joseph Chebet	Kenya	2:13:07
9	Lahoussine Mrikik	Morocco	2:13:31
10	Stephen Ndungu	Kenya	2:14:21
11	Róbert Štefko	Slovakia	2:14:45
12	Paul Kipsambu	Kenya	2:15:06
13	Scott Larson	United States	2:15:26
14	Clint Verran	United States	2:17:20
15	Alejandro Villanueva	Mexico	2:17:45
16	Chris Lundstrom	United States	2:18:08
17	Kenneth Cheruiyot	Kenya	2:18:20
18	Shawn Found	United States	2:18:29
19	Warren Petterson	South Africa	2:18:56
20	Keith Dowling	United States	2:19:10
—	Phaustin Baha Sulle	Tanzania	DNF
—	Jackson Kipngok	Kenya	DNF
—	Julius Kimutai	Kenya	DNF
—	Shem Kororia	Kenya	DNF

=== Women ===
Position	Athlete	Nationality	Time
1st place, gold medalist(s)	Margaret Okayo	Kenya	2:24:21
2nd place, silver medalist(s)	Susan Chepkemei	Kenya	2:25:12
3rd place, bronze medalist(s)	Svetlana Zakharova	Russia	2:25:13
4	Joyce Chepchumba	Kenya	2:25:51
5	Esther Kiplagat	Kenya	2:26:15
6	Lyudmila Petrova	Russia	2:26:18
7	Deena Kastor	United States	2:26:58
8	Yelena Paramonova	Russia	2:30:03
9	Madina Biktagirova	Russia	2:31:14
10	Elana Meyer	South Africa	2:31:43
11	Florence Barsosio	Kenya	2:31:50
12	Franca Fiacconi	Italy	2:32:57
13	Milena Glusac	United States	2:34:46
14	Colleen De Reuck	United States	2:35:31
15	Jeanne Cooper	United States	2:39:58
16	Monica Hostetler	United States	2:41:38
17	Gordon Bakoulis	United States	2:41:43
18	Brynhild Synstnes	Norway	2:41:58
19	Rosana Gutierrez	United States	2:42:26
20	Kelly Cordell	United States	2:42:28
—	Christine Clifton	United States	DNF
—	Nuța Olaru	Romania	DNF

=== Wheelchair men ===
Position	Athlete	Nationality	Time
1st place, gold medalist(s)	Saúl Mendoza	United States	1:39:25
2nd place, silver medalist(s)	Roberto Brigo	Italy	1:47:39
3rd place, bronze medalist(s)	Kamel Ayari	Tunisia	1:48:21
4	Scot Hollonbeck	United States	1:54:54
5	Hayk Abgaryan	Armenia	2:18:58
6	James Hallam	United Kingdom	2:19:03
7	Carlos Guzman	United States	2:23:00
8	Aleksan Bayanduryan	Armenia	2:36:45
9	Freddy Ramirez	Colombia	2:55:06
10	Oscar Londono	Colombia	2:56:32

=== Wheelchair women ===
Position	Athlete	Nationality	Time
1st place, gold medalist(s)	Francesca Porcellato	Italy	2:11:57
2nd place, silver medalist(s)	Antonella Munaro	Italy	2:59:17
3rd place, bronze medalist(s)	Christy Campbell	Canada	3:50:34
4	Judy Woolfenden	United Kingdom	5:16:17
5	Marialisa Galeazzi	Italy	5:22:11
6	Helga Thorsen	Norway	5:55:17
7	Jolana Skalova	Slovakia	6:52:36
8	Diane Robertson	United States	9:32:20

=== Handcycle men ===
Position	Athlete	Nationality	Time
1st place, gold medalist(s)	Ziv Bar-Shira	Israel	1:27:49
2nd place, silver medalist(s)	Bogdan Krol	Poland	1:34:17
3rd place, bronze medalist(s)	Randy Upper	Canada	1:37:19
4	John Ryan	Canada	1:46:18
5	John Curlander	United States	1:46:36

=== Handcycle women ===
Position	Athlete	Nationality	Time
1st place, gold medalist(s)	Helene Hines	United States	1:46:22
2nd place, silver medalist(s)	Kirsty Digger	United States	2:20:54
3rd place, bronze medalist(s)	Graciela Ramirez	Mexico	2:52:19
4	Isabel Bohn	United States	2:56:43
5	Mary Ellen Conaboy	United States	4:08:12

== Introduction of New Qualifying Times for Guaranteed Entry ==
The 2001 race was the first year in which NYRR offered general qualifying times for guaranteed entry. Prior to 2001, the only time qualifications were for runners that bordered on sub-elite (sub-2:30 for men and sub-3:00 for women).

In 2001, the qualification standards were loosened to accommodate more runners. A new set of standards for half marathons were also introduced, allowing runners to use a time from a half marathon to earn guaranteed entry into the New York City Marathon.

2001 Qualifying Times for Guaranteed Entry to the NYC Marathon
Age	Men's Marathon	Women's Marathon	Men's Half Marathon	Women's Half Marathon
Under 40	2:45:00	3:15:00	1:16:00	1:31:00
40 and Over	3:00:00	3:30:00	1:24:00	1:39:00
