= 2002 Boston Marathon =

Footrace in Boston, Massachusetts, USA

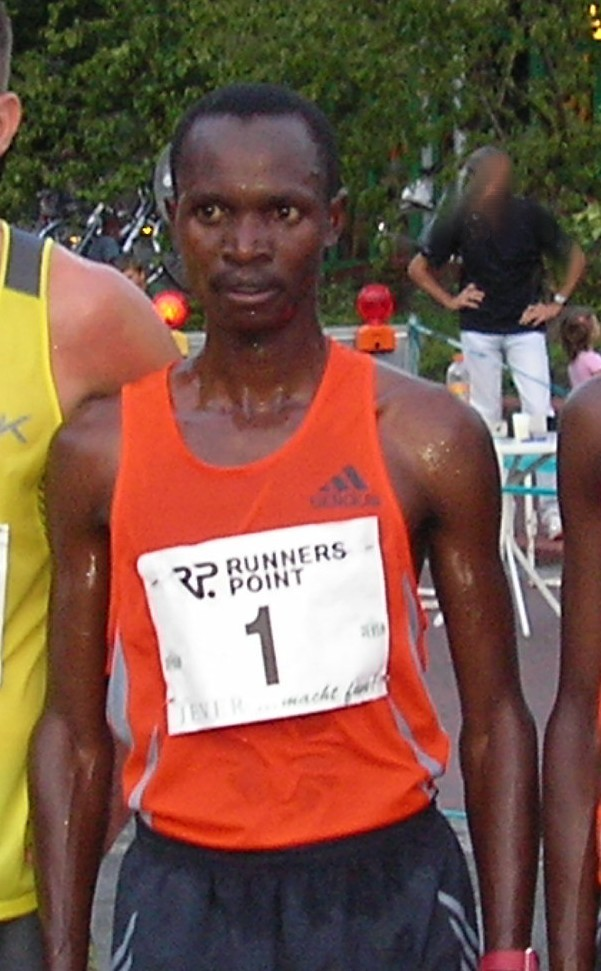
- Men's winner Rodgers Rop
- Venue: Boston, United States
- Dates: April 15

Champions
- Men: Rodgers Rop (2:09:02)
- Women: Margaret Okayo (2:20:43)

The 2002 Boston Marathon was the 106th running of the annual marathon race in Boston, United States and was held on April 15, 2002. The elite men's race was won by Kenya's Rodgers Rop in a time of 2:09:02 hours and the women's race was won by another Kenyan Margaret Okayo in 2:20:43.

A total of 14,400 people finished the race, 9149 men and 5251 women.

== Results ==
=== Men ===
Position	Athlete	Nationality	Time
1st place, gold medalist(s)	Rodgers Rop	Kenya	2:09:02
2nd place, silver medalist(s)	Christopher Cheboiboch	Kenya	2:09:05
3rd place, bronze medalist(s)	Fred Kiprop	Kenya	2:09:45
4	Mbarak Hussein	Kenya	2:09:45
5	Lee Bong-ju	South Korea	2:10:30
6	Elias Chebet	Kenya	2:10:40
7	Simon Bor	Kenya	2:11:39
8	Getachew Kebede	Ethiopia	2:11:43
9	Luis Fonseca	Venezuela	2:11:49
10	Silvio Guerra	Ecuador	2:12:28
11	Joshua Chelanga	Kenya	2:12:40
12	Joshua Kipkemboi	Kenya	2:12:48
13	David Busenei	Kenya	2:13:04
14	Fedor Ryzhov	Russia	2:13:04
15	Keith Dowling	United States	2:13:28
16	Elly Rono	Kenya	2:15:17
17	Clint Verran	United States	2:15:19
18	Noriaki Igarashi	Japan	2:15:55
19	Mark Coogan	United States	2:17:35
20	Kazuaki Wakamoto	Japan	2:17:58
21	Motsehi Moeketsana	South Africa	2:18:21
22	Christopher Wehrman	United States	2:19:03
23	Andrés Espinosa	Mexico	2:19:54
24	Osamu Nara	Japan	2:20:18
25	Gennadiy Temnikov	Russia	2:20:23

=== Women ===
Position	Athlete	Nationality	Time
1st place, gold medalist(s)	Margaret Okayo	Kenya	2:20:43
2nd place, silver medalist(s)	Catherine Ndereba	Kenya	2:21:12
3rd place, bronze medalist(s)	Elfenesh Alemu	Ethiopia	2:26:01
4	Sun Yingjie	China	2:27:26
5	Firaya Sultanova-Zhdanova	Russia	2:27:58
6	Bruna Genovese	Italy	2:29:02
7	Nuța Olaru	Romania	2:30:26
8	Mai Tagami	Japan	2:32:00
9	Gitte Karlshøj	Denmark	2:35:01
10	Yukari Komatsu	Japan	2:35:34
11	Jackie Fairweather	Australia	2:35:46
12	Irina Timofeyeva	Russia	2:36:47
13	Jill Boaz	United States	2:38:55
14	Gordon Bakoulis	United States	2:42:47
15	Norimi Sakurai	Japan	2:43:09
16	Janelle Burgmann	Australia	2:43:46
17	Esther Wanjiru	Kenya	2:44:32
18	Ayumi Noshita	Japan	2:44:47
19	Kelly Keeler	United States	2:45:00
20	Cathleen Campbell	United States	2:46:17
21	Carol Legate	United States	2:47:57
22	Laura Hruby	United States	2:48:49
23	Kristen Till	United States	2:48:52
24	Heather Gardiner	Canada	2:49:39
25	Monique Maddy	Liberia	2:50:10
