= 2001 Chicago Marathon =

Footrace held in Chicago, Illinois

24th Chicago Marathon
- Venue: Chicago, United States
- Dates: October 7

Champions
- Men: Ben Kimondiu (2:08:52)
- Women: Catherine Ndereba (2:18:47)

The 2001 Chicago Marathon was the 24th running of the annual marathon race in Chicago, United States and was held on October 7. The elite men's race was won by Kenya's Ben Kimondiu in a time of 2:08:52 hours and the women's race was won by Catherine Ndereba, also of Kenya, in 2:18:47. Ndereba's time was a new marathon world record, improving 59 seconds on the time of Naoko Takahashi, set only one week earlier at the 2001 Berlin Marathon. Ndereba's record lasted until the 2002 Chicago Marathon, where Paula Radcliffe set a world record on the Chicago course for a second year running.

== Results ==
=== Men ===
Position	Athlete	Nationality	Time
1	Ben Kimondiu	Kenya	2:08:52
2	Paul Tergat	Kenya	2:08:56
3	Peter Githuka	Kenya	2:09:00
4	Mohamed Ouaadi	France	2:09:26
5	Noriaki Igarashi	Japan	2:09:35
6	Rod DeHaven	United States	2:11:40
7	Ondoro Osoro	Kenya	2:11:44
8	Shaun Creighton	Australia	2:11:54
9	Mitsunori Hirayama	Japan	2:12:25
10	Simon Mphulanyane	South Africa	2:12:44

=== Women ===
Position	Athlete	Nationality	Time
1	Catherine Ndereba	Kenya	2:18:47 WR
2	Elfenesh Alemu	Ethiopia	2:24:54
3	Kerryn McCann	Australia	2:26:04
4	Małgorzata Sobańska	Poland	2:26:08
5	Nives Curti	Italy	2:28:59
6	Kayoko Obata	Japan	2:32:19
7	Ichiyo Naganuma	Japan	2:34:02
8	Anne van Schuppen	Netherlands	2:41:51
9	Karin Schön	Sweden	2:42:27
10	Kelly Keeler	United States	2:43:06
