= Vecht =

Vecht may refer to:

- Vecht (Utrecht), a Rhine branch in the Netherlands from Utrecht to the IJmeer (Lake IJ) near Muiden, sometimes called Utrechtse Vecht
  - Vechtstreek, the region along the above river Vecht
- Vechte, a river that originates in the German state of North Rhine-Westphalia and ends in confluence with river Zwarte Water in the Netherlands province of Overijssel; often called Overijsselse Vecht in Dutch
- Stichtse Vecht, a municipality of the Netherlands in the province of Utrecht
- Rosa Vecht (1881–1915), Dutch nurse
