= Naples Half Marathon =

- The 2018 Naples Daily News Half Marathon Logo
- Date: January
- Location: Naples, Florida, U.S.
- Event type: Road
- Distance: Half marathon
- Course records: 1:02:41 (men); 1:09:57 (women)
- Website: www.napleshalfmarathon.net

The Naples Half Marathon is an annual half marathon road running race held in Naples, Florida, United States, since 1989 (with the exception of 2016 due to a tornado). The 25th running of the race was held on January 20, 2013, with 2036 runners taking part, including two-time Olympian Anthony Famiglietti, who finished seventh. The 2014 race saw a repeat victory by Kiprono Kurgat ahead of a crowd of 2412 total runners.

The race has been called one of the best 27 half marathons in the United States by Runner's World magazine.

The men's record on the course is held by Cleophas Ngetich, with a time of 1:02:41, while the women's record is 1:09:57, held by Gebre Belainesh.

The course starts down 5th Avenue South, then turns south down Gordon Drive for just under 3 miles, then turns around to go north up Gordon Drive for over another mile. Then, the course turns into the Port Royal neighborhood at Kings Town Drive, with a loop down Fort Charles Drive (where the halfway mark is, on the northbound return leg), up Treasure Lane to Galleon Drive, then back out via Treasure Lane to Kings Town, and back north on Gordon. There is a turn onto 8th Avenue South, then the finish is up 8th Street next to Cambier Park.

== Winners ==
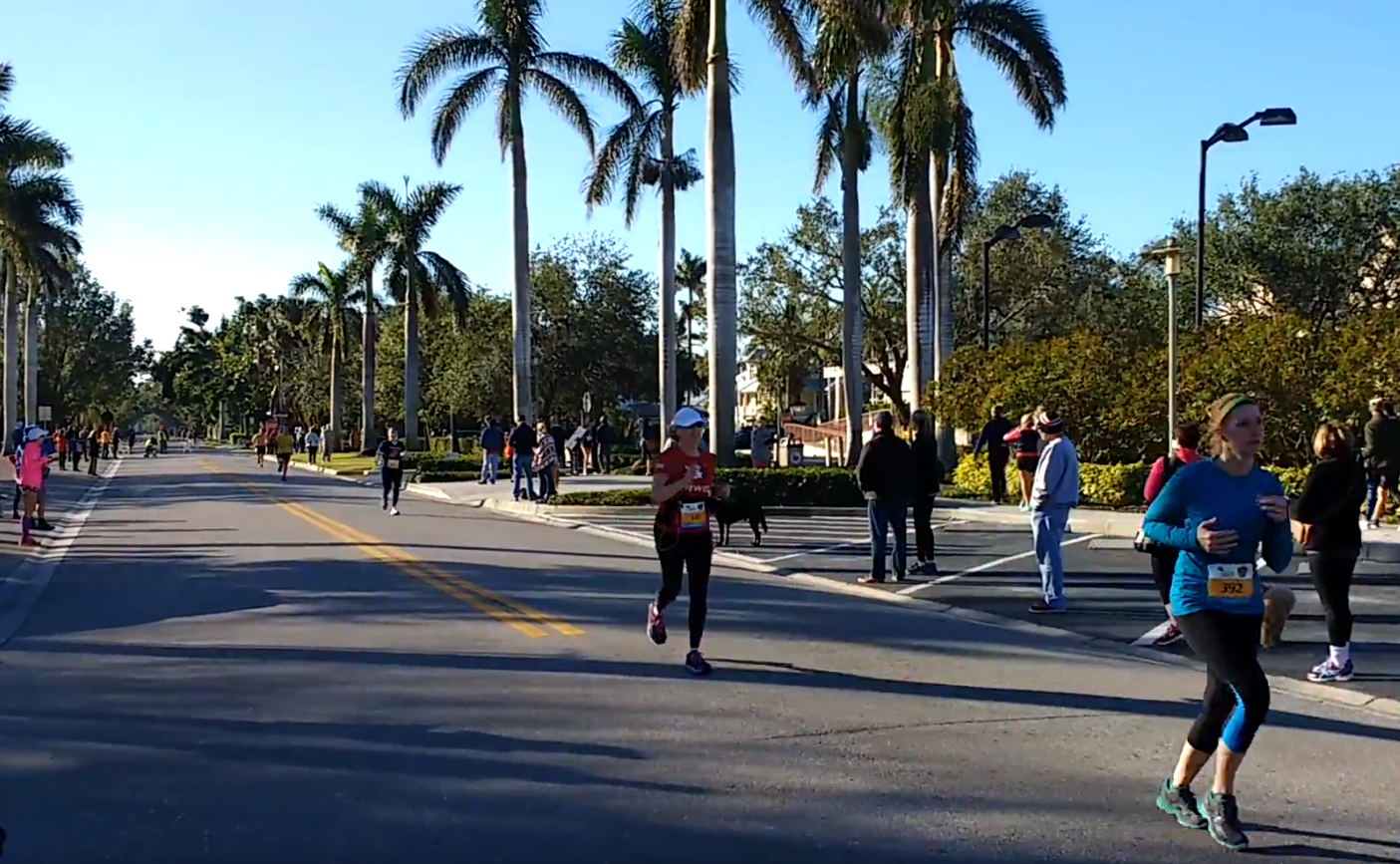
The finish Line of the Naples Half Marathon in 2018.

Course record

Year	Date	Men's winner	Time (h:m:s)	Women's winner	Time (h:m:s)
2023	January 15	Logan Howard (USA)	1:10:50	Stephanie Muscat (USA)	1:20:20
2022	January 16	Kiya Dandena (USA)	1:05:36	Branna MacDougall (Canada)	1:14:24
2021	January 17	Parker Stinson (USA)	1:03:33	Lindsay Flanagan (USA)	1:10:23
2020	January 19	Nathan Martin (USA)	1:03:36	Kaitlin Goodman (USA)	1:13:51
2019	January 20	Tyler McClandless (USA)	1:04:17	Lindsey Scherf (USA)	1:16:41
2018	January 14	Parker Stinson (USA)	1:03:34	Belainesh Gebre (ETH)	1:12:55
2017	January 15	Tyler McCandless (USA)	1:06:02	Belainesh Gebre (ETH)	1:13:29
2016	January 17	Cancelled due to tornado			
2015	January 18	Cleophas Ngetich (KEN)	1:02:41	Zipporah Chebet (KEN)	1:19:00
2014	January 19	Kiprono Kurgat (KEN)	1:04:01	Caroline Rotich (KEN)	1:09:57
2013	January 20	Kiprono Kurgat (KEN)	1:03:37	Belainesh Gebre (ETH)	1:11:54
2012	January 11	Reuben Mwei (KEN)	1:04:33	Stephanie Pezzullo (USA)	1:13:12
2011	January 16	Nicholas Kurgat (KEN)	1:03:25	Belainesh Gebre (ETH)	1:09:57
2010	January 17	Simon Sawe (KEN)	1:04:31	Buzunesh Deba (ETH)	1:12:49
2009	January 18	Nicholas Kurgat (KEN)	1:03:45	Belainesh Gebre (ETH)	1:12:14
2008	January 20	George Towett (KEN)	1:04:47	Tara Quinn-Smith (CAN)	1:13:52
2007	January 21	Joseph Chirlee (KEN)	1:04:18	Turena Johnson Lane (USA)	1:15:55
2006	January 22	John Henwood (NZ)	1:05:00	Firaya Sultanova-Zhdanova (RUS)	1:15:30
2005	January 23	John Korir (KEN)	1:05:22	Lyubov Denisova (RUS)	1:14:26
2004	January 18	Zepherinus Joseph (LC)	1:06:56	Ramilia Burangulova (RUS)	1:14:11
2003	January 26	Elly Rono (KEN)	1:04:36	Amy Yoder Begley (USA)	1:13:39
2002	January 27	Rod DeHaven (USA)	1:04:38	Ramilia Burangulova (RUS)	1:14:08
2001	January 28	Elly Rono (KEN)	1:04:56	Ramilia Burangulova (RUS)	1:14:54
2000	January 30	Rod DeHaven (USA)	1:03:12	Tatyana Pozdnyakova (UKR)	1:12:40
1999	January 24	Randy Ashley (USA)	1:05:10	Lidiya Gigorieva (RUS)	1:13:33
1998	January 25	Steve Boyd (CAN)	1:04:14	Svetlana Zakharova (RUS)	1:13:21
1997	January 19	Yuri Punda (RUS)	1:04:37	Ramila Burangulova (RUS)	1:11:16
1996	January 28	Keith Brantly (USA)	1:03:44	Lybov Klochko (RUS)	1:14:33

By country

Country	Total	Men's	Women's
Kenya	14	12	2
Ethiopia	6		6
United States	18	11	7
New Zealand	1	1	
Russia	10	1	9
Canada	3	1	2
Saint Lucia	1	1	
Ukraine	1		1
