= Church (congregation) =

Christian congregation that meets for worship

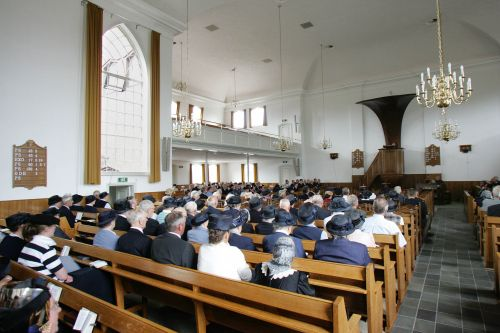
Congregants worship in a Dutch Restored Reformed church, Doornspijk

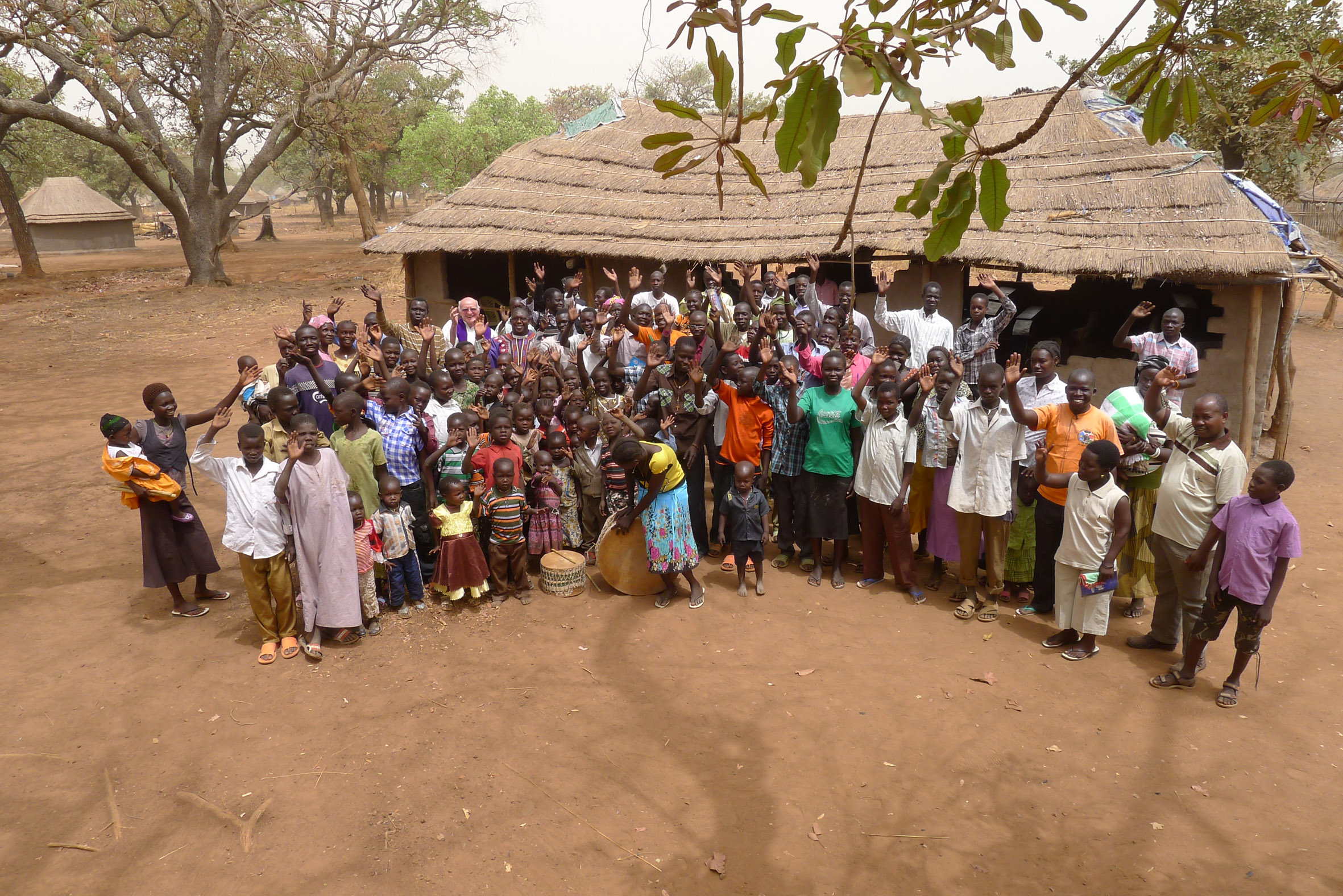
A village church in South Sudan

A church (or local church) is a Christian organization or congregation that meets in a particular location, often for worship. Many are formally organized, with constitutions and by-laws, maintain offices, are served by clergy or lay leaders, and, in nations where this is permissible, often seek non-profit corporate status. The term is distinct from the use of the word "church" to mean a church building.

Local churches often relate with, affiliate with, or consider themselves to be constitutive parts of denominations, which are also called churches in many traditions. Depending on the tradition, these organizations may connect local churches to larger church traditions, ordain and defrock clergy, define terms of membership and exercise church discipline, and have organizations for cooperative ministry such as educational institutions and missionary societies. Non-denominational churches are not part of denominations, but may consider themselves part of larger church movements without institutional expression.

== History ==
The word church is used in the sense of a distinct congregation in a given city in slightly under half of the 200 uses of the term in the New Testament. John Locke defined a church as "a voluntary society of men, joining themselves together of their own accord in order to the public worshipping of God in such manner as they judge acceptable to him".

A local church may be run using congregationalist polity and may be associated with other similar congregations in a denomination or convention, as are the churches of the Southern Baptist Convention or like German or Swiss Landeskirchen. It may be united with other congregations under the oversight of a council of pastors as are Presbyterian churches. It may be united with other parishes under the oversight of bishops, as are Anglican, Lutheran, Oriental Orthodox, and Eastern Orthodox churches. Finally, the local church may function as the lowest subdivision in a global hierarchy under the leadership of one bishop, such as the pope (the bishop of Rome) of the Roman Catholic Church. Such association or unity is a church's ecclesiastical polity.

The word church may rarely be used for other religious communities. For non-Christian communities the term may be considered archaic or even offensive, negating existing terms such as synagogue or mosque used to refer to their community or place of worship.

== Etymology ==
The Greek word ekklēsia, literally "called out" or "called forth" and commonly used to indicate a group of individuals called to gather for some function, in particular an assembly of the citizens of a city, as in Acts 19:32–41, is the New Testament term referring to the Christian Church (either a particular local congregation or the whole body of the faithful). In the Septuagint, the Greek word "ἐκκλησία" is used to translate the Hebrew "קהל" (qahal). In most Romance and Celtic languages, the word for church derives from the Greek word or its Latin form ecclesia (Spanish iglesia, French église, Italian chiesa, Irish eaglais, Welsh eglwys).

The English language word "church" is from the Old English word cirice, derived from West Germanic *kirika, which in turn comes from the Greek κυριακή kuriakē, meaning "of the Lord" (possessive form of κύριος kurios "ruler" or "lord"). Kuriakē in the sense of "church" is most likely a shortening of κυριακὴ οἰκία kuriakē oikia ("house of the Lord") or ἐκκλησία κυριακή ekklēsia kuriakē ("congregation of the Lord"). Some grammarians and scholars say that the word has uncertain roots and may derive from the Anglo-Saxon "kirke" from the Latin "circus" and the Greek "kuklos" for "circle", which shape is the form in which many religious groups met and gathered. Christian churches were sometimes called κυριακόν kuriakon (adjective meaning "of the Lord") in Greek starting in the fourth century, but ekklēsia and βασιλική basilikē were more common.

The word is one of many direct Greek-to-Germanic loans of Christian terminology, via the Goths. The Slavic terms for "church" (Old Church Slavonic црькꙑ [crĭky], Russian церковь [cerkov’], Slovenian cerkev) are via the Old High German cognate chirihha.

== Description ==
Among congregational churches, since each local church is autonomous, there are no formal lines of responsibility to organizational levels of higher authority. Deacons of each church are elected by the congregation. In some Baptist congregations, for example, deacons function much like a board of directors or executive committee authorized to make important decisions. Although these congregations typically retain the right to vote on major decisions such as purchasing or selling property, large spending, and the hiring or firing of pastors and other paid ministers. In many such local churches, the role of deacons includes pastoral and nurturing responsibilities. Typically, congregational churches have informal worship styles, less structured services, and may tend toward modern music and celebrations.

Local churches united with others under the oversight of a bishop are normally called "parishes", by Roman Catholic, Eastern Orthodox, Anglican, and Lutheran communions. Each parish usually has one active parish church, though seldom and historically more than one. The parish church has always been fundamental to the life of every parish community, especially in rural areas. For example, in the Church of England, parish churches are the oldest churches to be found in England. A number are substantially of Anglo-Saxon date and all subsequent periods of architecture are represented in the country. Most parishes have churches that date back to the Middle Ages. Thus, such local churches tend to favor traditional, formal worship styles, liturgy, and classical music styles, although modern trends are common as well.

Local parishes of the Roman Catholic Church, like episcopal parishes, favor formal worship styles, and still more traditional structure in services. The importance of formal office is also a distinctive trait; thus a solemn mass may include the presence of officers of the Knights of Columbus as an escort for the regional bishop when he is present. Likewise, vestments are valued to inculcate the solemnity of the Holy Eucharist and are typically more elaborate than in other churches.

A local church may also be a mission, that is a smaller church under the sponsorship of a larger congregation, a bishop, or a greater church hierarchy. Often congregational churches prefer to call such local mission churches "church plants."

A local church may also work in association with parachurch organizations. While parachurch organizations/ministries are vital to accomplishing specific missions on behalf of the church they do not normally take the place of the local church.

== Church asylum ==
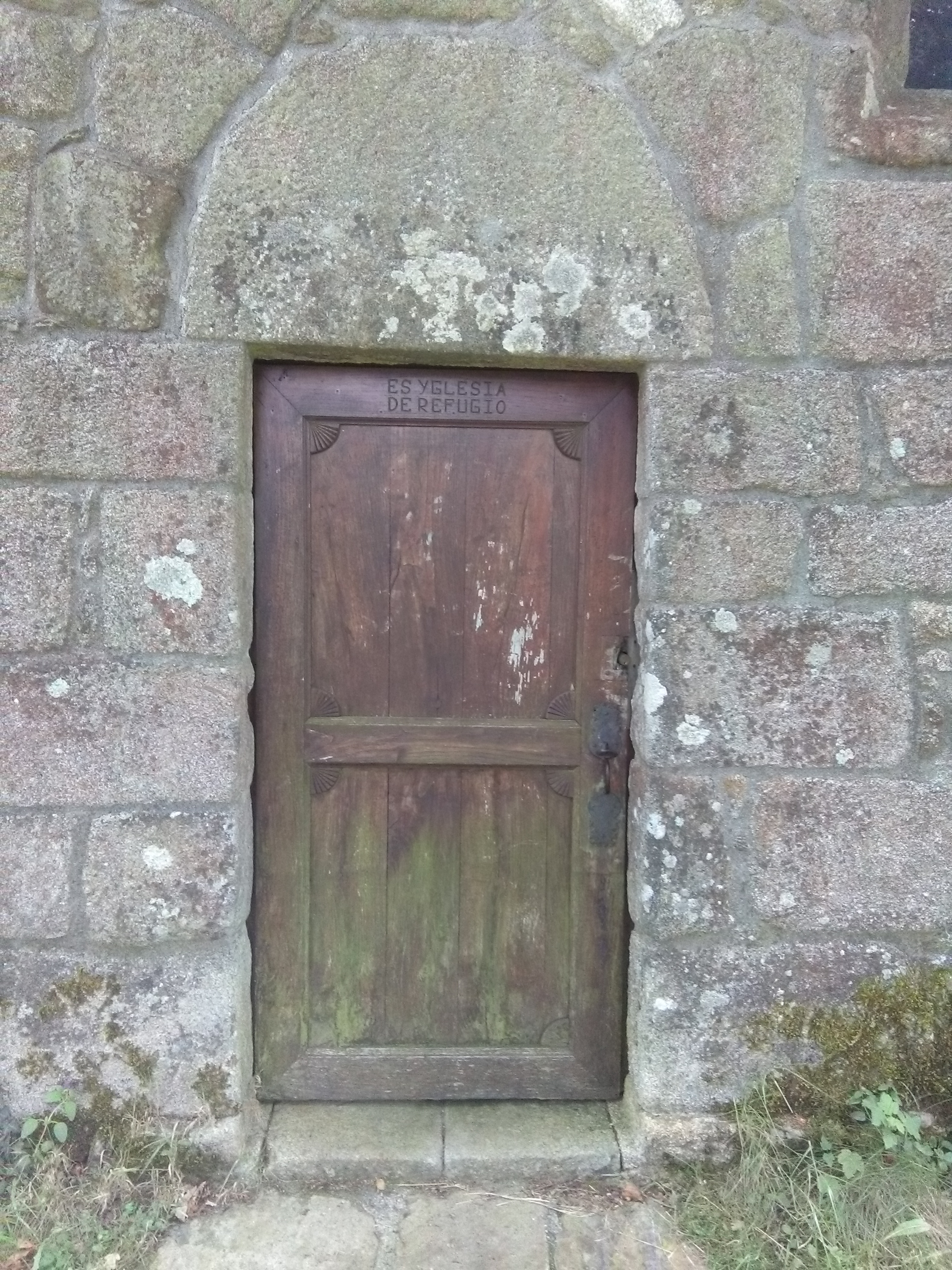
The door of this Spanish church is inscribed ES YGLESIA DE REFUGIO ("[This] is an asylum church").

The Catholic Church has long offered housing to asylum seekers in the form of church asylum. In this tradition, the church provides sanctuary to asylum seekers for a short duration on their congregation's premises.

During the nineteenth century in the United States, many churches, particularly the African Methodist Episcopal Zion Church, sheltered those escaping Southern slavery. Many of these churches assisted fugitive slaves and aligned themselves with the growing abolitionist movement in the northern United States.

== See also ==
- Ecclesiastical polity
- Congregational church
- Parish
- Particular church
- House church
- Early centers of Christianity
- Qahal
