= Elburg =

- Municipality
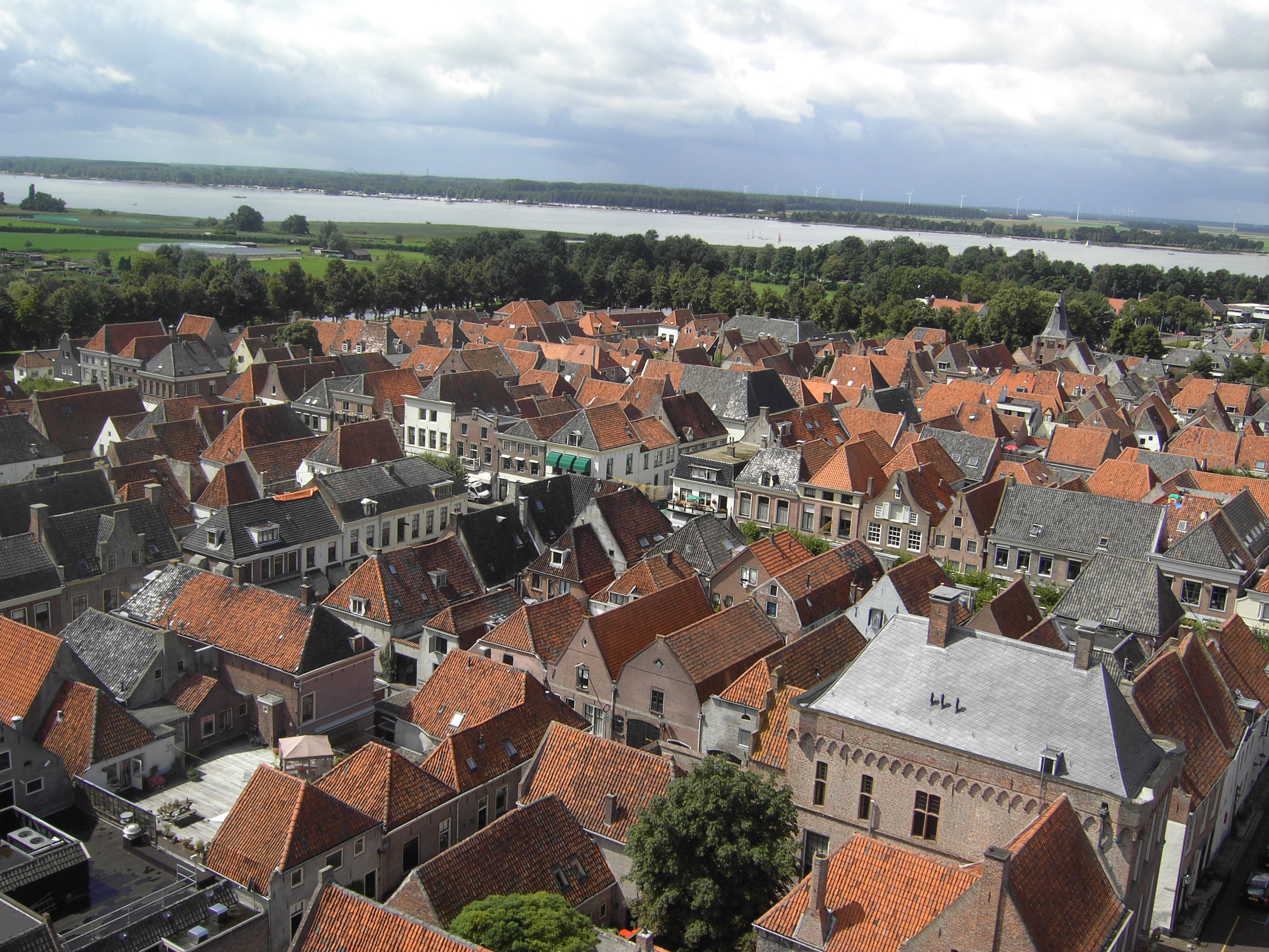
- View of Elburg from the church tower

- Flag Coat of arms

- Location in Gelderland

- Location in The Netherlands
- Coordinates: 52°27′N 5°51′E
- Country: Netherlands
- Province: Gelderland

Government
  - Body: Municipal council
  - Mayor (Acting): Harm-Jan van Schaik (CDA)

Area
  - Total: 65.91 km^{2} (25.45 sq mi)
  - Land: 63.82 km^{2} (24.64 sq mi)
  - Water: 2.09 km^{2} (0.81 sq mi)
- Elevation: 1 m (3.3 ft)

Population (January 2021)
  - Total: 23,429
  - Density: 367/km^{2} (950/sq mi)
- Demonym: Elburger
- Time zone: UTC+1 (CET)
  - Summer (DST): UTC+2 (CEST)
- Postcode: 8080–8085
- Area code: 0525
- Website: www.elburg.nl

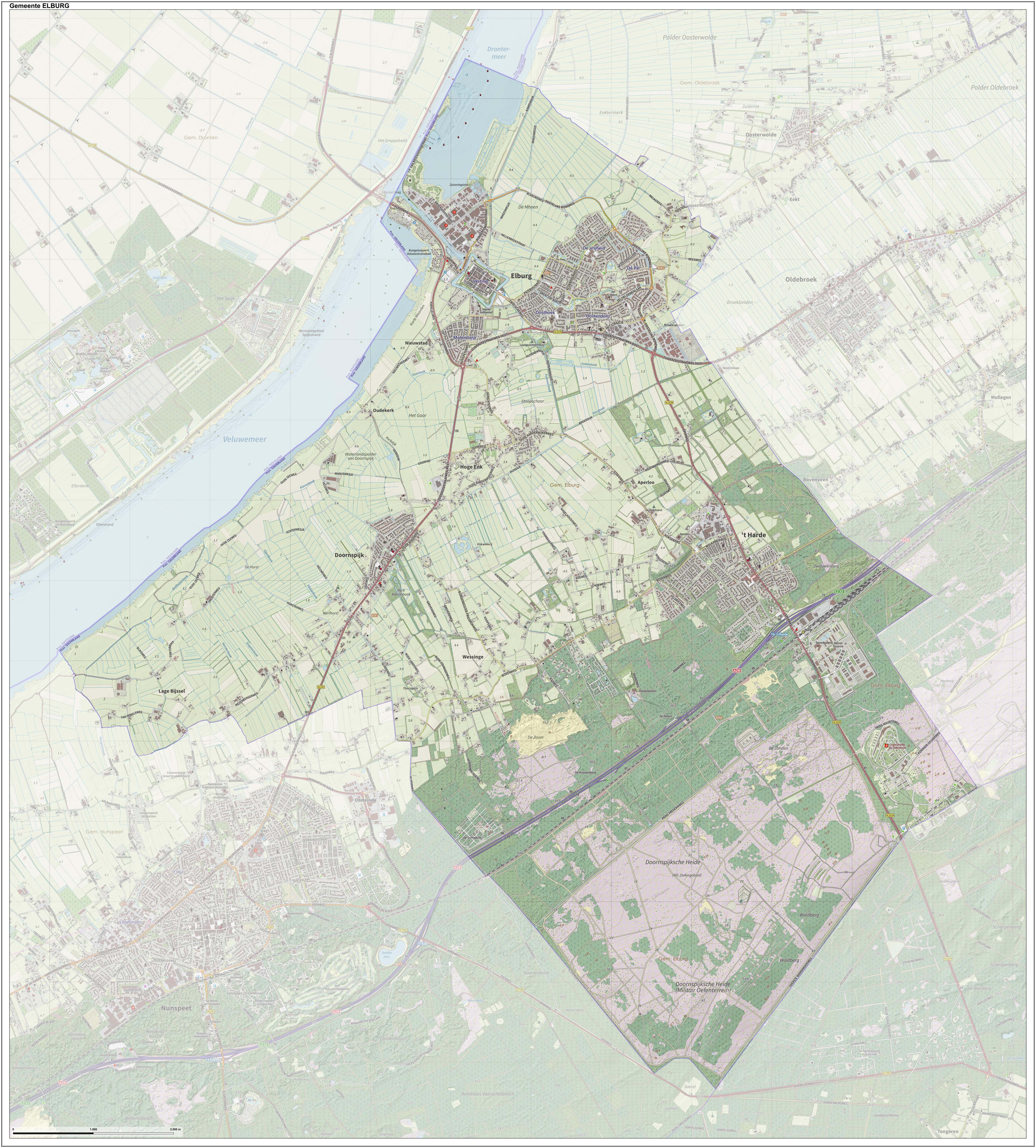
Dutch Topographic map of Elburg, June 2015

Elburg (Dutch pronunciation: [ˈɛlbʏr(ə)x]) is a municipality and a city in the province of Gelderland, Netherlands.

== History ==
There is evidence of a Neolithic settlement at Elburg consisting of stone tools and pottery shards. From Roman times there are names and shards of earthenware which suggest that there was an army camp at the site of Elburg. The earliest extant written record of Elburg is from 796 AD.

Between 1392 and 1396 Elburg was rebuilt with a moat and a city wall, together with a gridiron street plan. This rapid rebuilding was expensive, indicating that Elburg was reasonably affluent in medieval times. Several records of Elburg date back to the 14th century. Elburg was granted town status probably by Count Otto II In the 13th century. There is a record that Elburg got its fishing right granted in 1313. In 1367 the city was recorded as a member of the Hanseatic League. At the end of the 16th century new moats and higher ramparts were built because of the improved war-techniques.

Throughout the centuries, Elburgh remained a fishing and farming center until the end of World War II. Unlike many other Dutch towns, Elburg had refused to use city funds to build a railroad station in 1863. Because the land owners were asking unreasonably high prices for the right of way over their property, the track line Utrecht-Amersfoort-Zwolle bypassed Elburg. As a consequence, Elburg became less attractive for manufacturers compared with neighboring places like Harderwijk and Nunspeet. In addition, the closing off of the Zuiderzee in 1932 meant an end to the fishing industry of Elburg, since the former salt water bay gradually became a fresh water body. Therefore, since 1956, the city concluded that only tourism would be the most viable sector for the local economy. Because of its favourable position both on the edge of the canal and near the Veluwemeer, tourists have made it a popular tourist destination. Each year many visit to see the largely unchanged medieval town, especially during the 'Midweekfeesten' (mid-week feasts), 'Botterdagen' (Botter days - a botter is a type of flat-bottomed fishing boat) and 'Winter in de Vesting' (Winter in the Fortress), which attract more than 30,000 visitors each year.

== Population centers ==
- Doornspijk
- Elburg
- 't Harde
- Hoge Enk
- Oostendorp

== Notable people ==
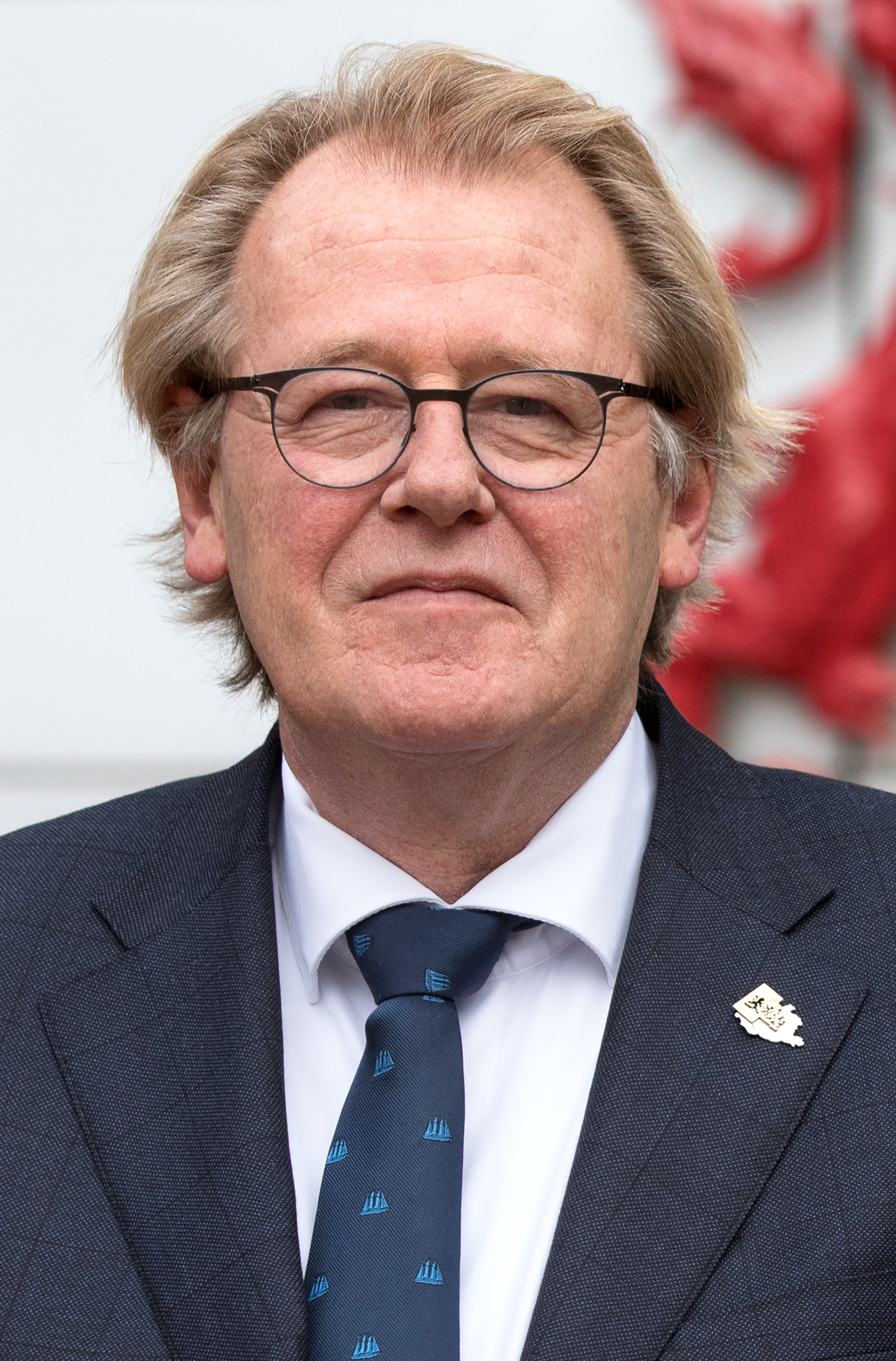
Jaap Smit, 2018

- Jan van der Elburcht (1500 in Elburg – 1571) an early Dutch painter
- Jacob Jan van der Maaten (1820 in Elburg – 1879) a Dutch painter and etcher
- Rosa Vecht (1881 in Elburg - 1915), the only Dutch nurse to die in World War I
- Jaap Smit (born 1957 in 't Harde) a Dutch preacher, manager and the King's Commissioner of South Holland
- Pieter Jan Leusink (born 1958 in Elburg) a Dutch conductor of classical music

=== Sport ===
- Anne van Schuppen (born 1960 in Doornspijk) a former long-distance runner, competed at the 1996 Summer Olympics
- Duncan Huisman (born 1971 in Doornspijk) a Dutch racing driver
- Kira Bulten (born 1973 in Elburg) a former breaststroke swimmer, who competed at the 1992 Summer Olympics
- Dick Boschman (born 1974 in Elburg) a Dutch sport shooter, competed at the 2000 and 2004 Summer Olympics

== Gallery ==
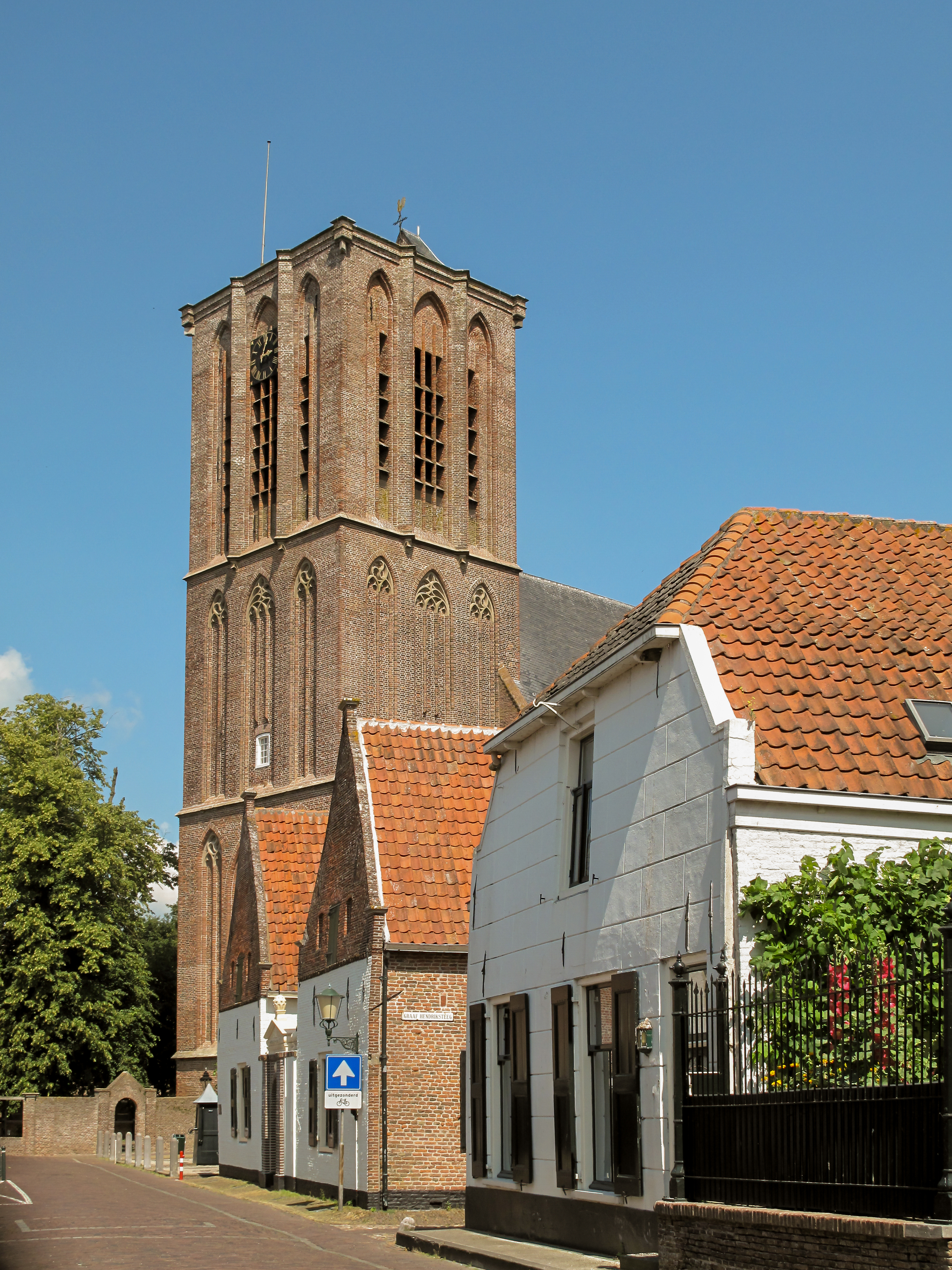
Church tower (de Sint Nicolaaskerk)

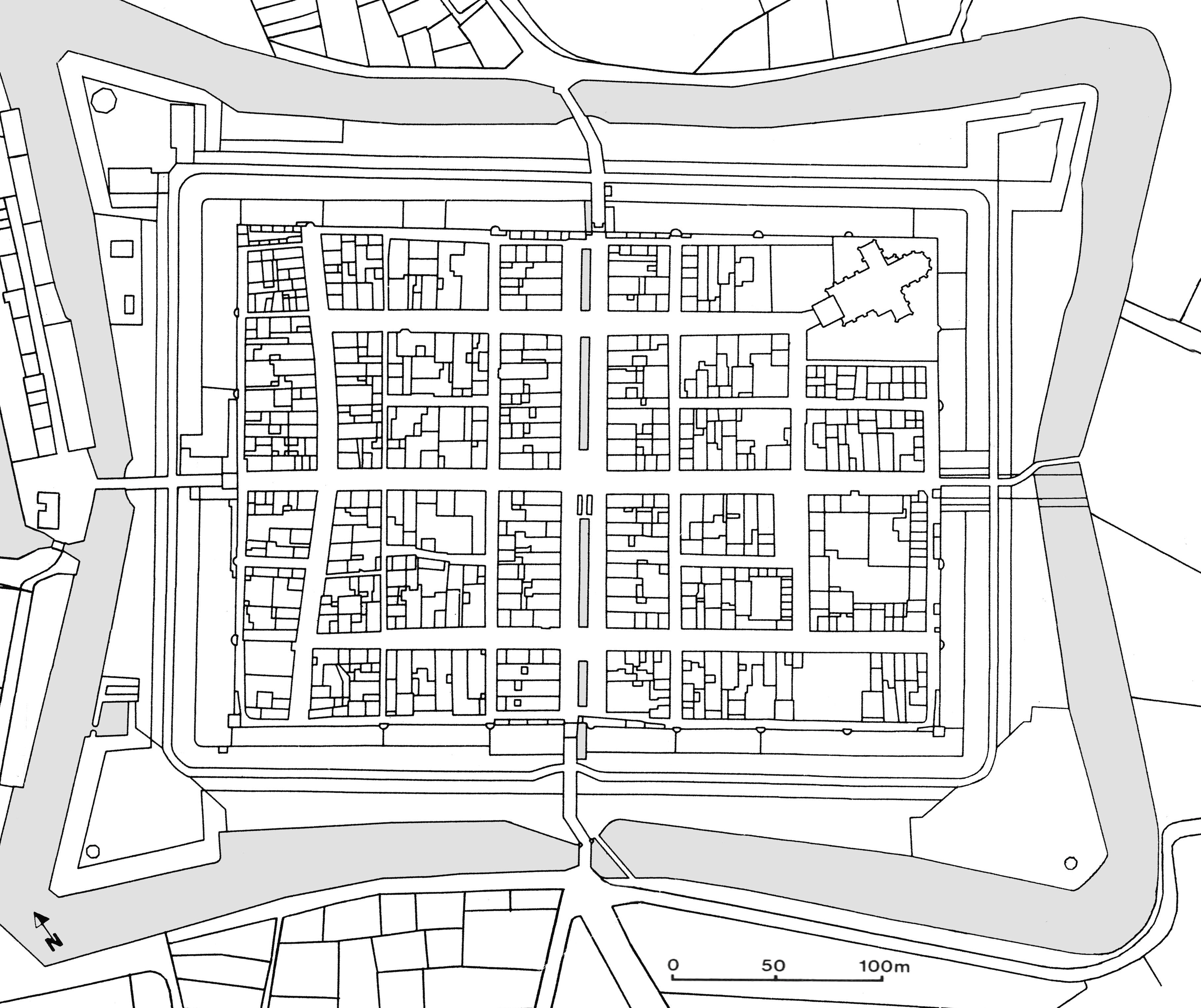
Cadastral plan 1830

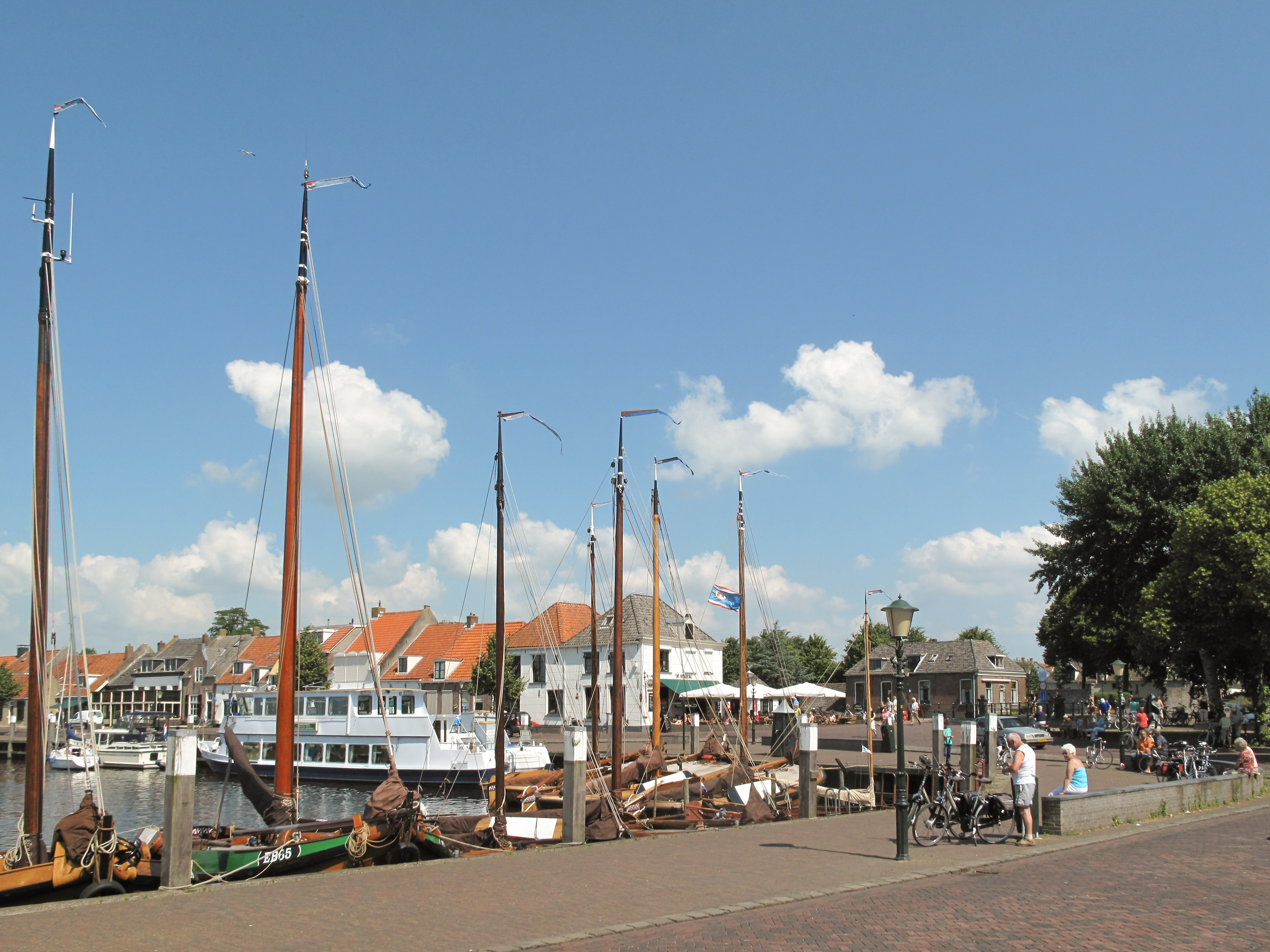
View of the port

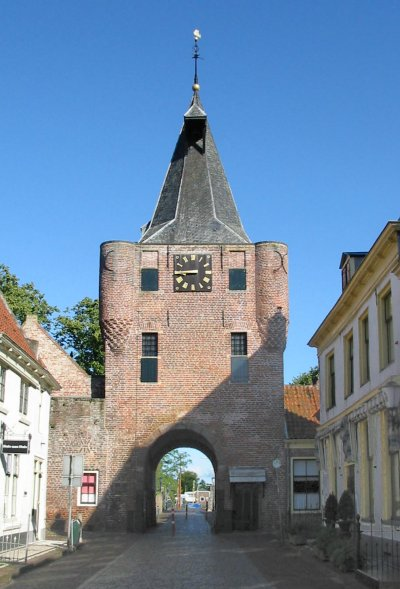
Vischpoort (Fish Gate)

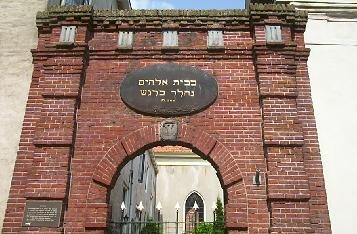
Synagogue in Elburg

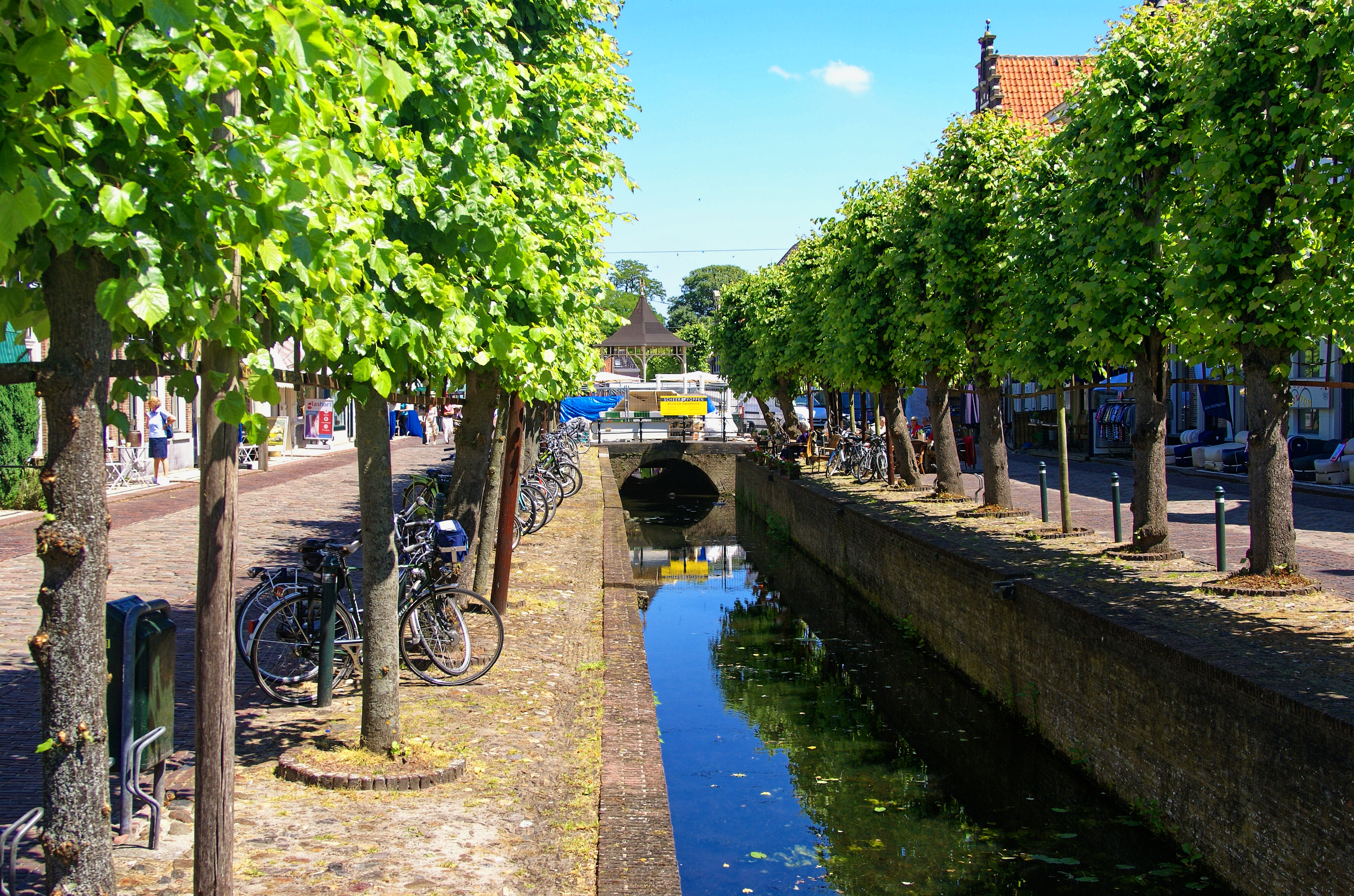
Beekstraat in Elburg, view NE
