= Jan van der Elburcht =

Dutch painter

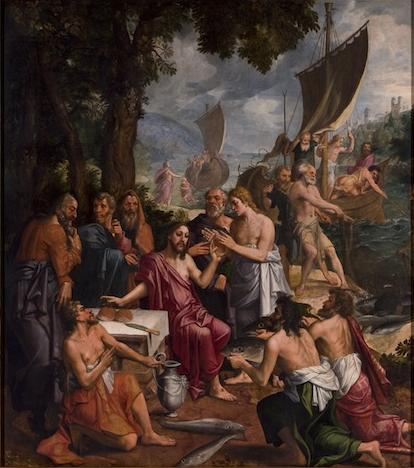
The Miraculous catch of fish, 1560, Onze-Lieve-Vrouwekathedraal, Antwerp

Jan van der Elburcht (1500–1571) was an early Dutch painter. His name is derived from Elburg, his town of birth.

According to Karel van Mander he was called cleen Hansken (little Hans), and was known for landscapes. Sandrart called him der kleine Hans and claimed he was known for his altarpiece for the fisher's altar in the Onze-Lieve-Vrouwekathedraal, Antwerp depicting the Miraculous catch of fish.

According to the RKD he became a member of the Antwerp Guild of St. Luke in 1536. He was a history painter. He died in Antwerp.
