= Rod DeHaven =

American long-distance runner

Rod DeHaven (born September 21, 1966, in Palo Alto, California) is the Head Men's and Women's Cross Country Coach and Track and Field Coach at South Dakota State University (2011 to present). SDSU is his alma mater where he holds several school records in track.

Before returning to SDSU, Rod spent time as a professional runner. His most notable achievement is winning the 2000 Olympic Trials marathon and being the only athlete to represent the United States at the marathon at the 2000 Summer Olympics in Sydney. DeHaven is also the course record holder for the Naples Half Marathon, with a 1:03:12 time set in 2000.

== International competitions ==
Year	Competition	Venue	Position	Event	Notes
Representing United States
2001	Chicago Marathon	Chicago, Illinois	6th	Marathon	2:11:40
2000	Naples Half Marathon	Naples, Florida	1st	Half-marathon	1:03:12
2000	Olympic Games	Sydney, Australia	69th	Marathon	2:30:46
2000	2000 US Olympic Trials Marathon	Pittsburgh, Pennsylvania	1st	Marathon	2:15:30
1999	7th IAAF World Championships	Seville, Spain	24th	Marathon	2:19:06
1998	Chicago Marathon	Chicago, Illinois	15th	Marathon	2:13:01
1991	19th IAAF World Cross Country Championships	Antwerp, Belgium	194th	12k	37:34

== Personal bests ==
- 800 meters - 1:48.67 (1986 - SDSU School Record)
- 1500 meters - 3:40.15 (1987 - SDSU School Record)
- Mile - 4:00.96 (1987 - SDSU School Record)
- 8 kilometers - 22:54 (1999 Cedar Rapids)
- 10,000 meters- 28:17.25 (2000 Palo Alto)
- Half marathon - 1:03:12 (2000 Naples FL)
- Marathon - 2:11:40 (2001 Chicago)
