= Margaret Okayo =

Kenyan marathon runner

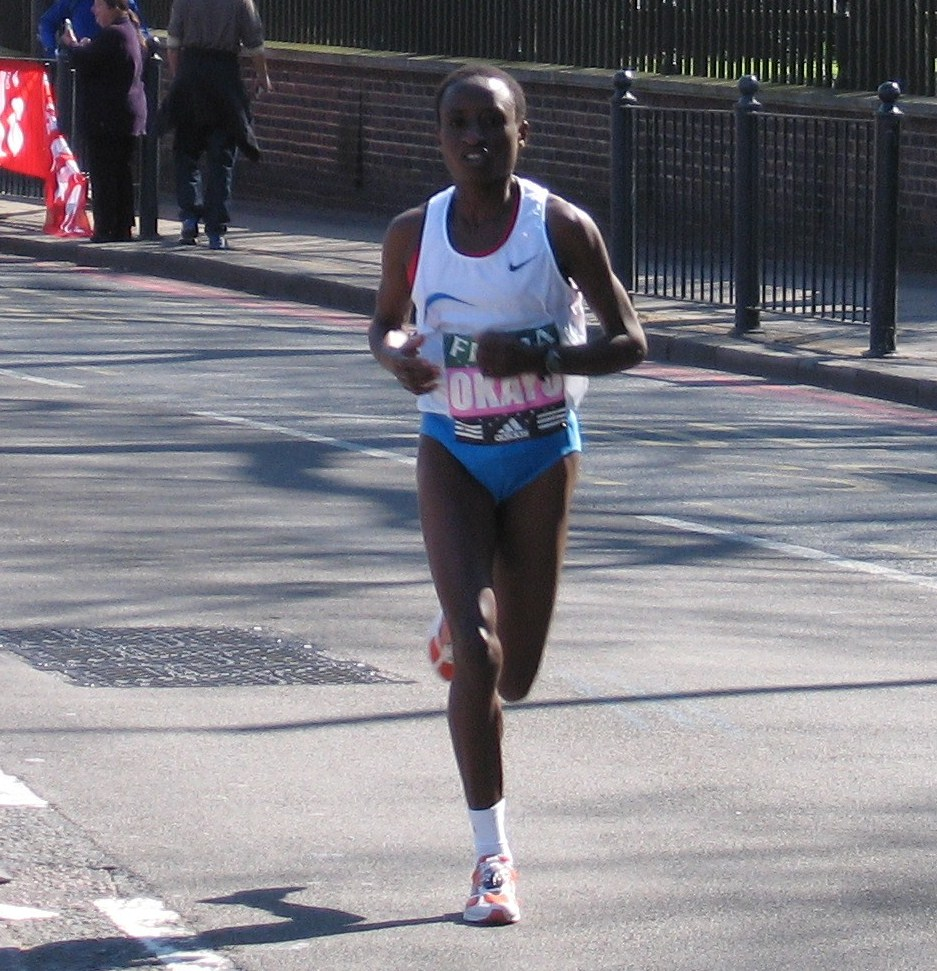
- Okayo running in the 2005 London Marathon

Personal information
- Born: 30 May 1976 (age 50) Masaba, Kisii District, Kenya
- Height: 1.51 m (4 ft 11 in)

Sport
- Country: Kenya
- Sport: Athletics
- Event: Marathon

Achievements and titles
- Personal best: 2:22:35 (London 2004)
Medal record
Women's athletics
Representing Kenya
World Marathon Majors
Gold medal – first place	2001 New York City	Marathon
Gold medal – first place	2002 Boston	Marathon
Gold medal – first place	2003 New York City	Marathon
Gold medal – first place	2004 London	Marathon
Silver medal – second place	1999 Chicago	Marathon
Bronze medal – third place	2000 New York City	Marathon

Margaret Okayo (born 30 May 1976) is a professional Kenyan marathon runner. She has won four World Marathon Majors with victories in the New York City Marathon (two times), the Boston Marathon and the London Marathon, setting three course records. Okayo's 2003 New York course record of 2:22:31 stood until 2025, despite the challenge of some of the world's best distance runners having the benefit of improved shoe technology. She has also won the San Diego Marathon on two occasions.

== Biography ==
Margaret Okayo started running while at primary school. She graduated from the Itierio Secondary School, located near Kisii town, in 1993. She was recruited by Kenya Prisons Service, home to the country's top women's marathon runners, in 1995 where she nurtured her running career.

At the 1998 Commonwealth Games she finished fifth in 10,000 metres. She finished thirteenth at the 1999 IAAF World Half Marathon Championships.

Amongst her most successful races are the wins at the New York Marathon in 2001 and 2003, the Boston Marathon in 2002 and the London Marathon in 2004. She still holds the course records at the New York Marathon and the Boston Marathon.

Other marathons won by Okayo include Milan in 2003, San Diego in 2000 and 2001. She represented her native Kenya in the 2004 Summer Olympic Games in Athens, Greece, but did not finish the marathon. She spends three months of every year training in Italy.

She won the 2003 Udine Half Marathon and finished third at the 2008 Rome-Ostia Half Marathon.

Okayo is of the Gusii tribe. She is managed by Federico Rosa and coached by Gabriele Rosa.

== Achievements ==
- All results regarding marathon, unless stated otherwise

Representing Kenya
Year	Competition	Venue	Position	Event	Time
1999	Chicago Marathon	Chicago, IL, United States	2nd	2:26:00	
2000	Rock 'n' Roll San Diego Marathon	San Diego, CA, United States	1st	2:27:05	
2000	New York City Marathon	New York, NY, United States	3rd	2:26:36	
2001	Rock 'n' Roll San Diego Marathon	San Diego, CA, United States	1st	2:25:05	
2001	New York City Marathon	New York, NY, United States	1st	2:24:21	
2002	Boston Marathon	Boston, MA, United States	1st	2:20:43	
2002	Milan Marathon	Milan, Italy	1st	2:24:59	
2003	Boston Marathon	Boston, MA, United States	4th	2:27:39	
2003	New York City Marathon	New York, NY, United States	1st	2:22:31	
2004	London Marathon	London, United Kingdom	1st	2:22:35	
2004	Olympic Games	Athens, Greece	—	DNF	
2004	New York City Marathon	New York, NY, United States	4th	2:26:31	
2005	London Marathon	London, United Kingdom	4th	2:25:22	
2006	London Marathon	London, United Kingdom	9th	2:29:16	
