= Kamel Ayari =

Tunisian-American wheelchair racer

Personal information
- Born: 1967 or 1968 (age 57–58) Tunisia

Sport
- Sport: Wheelchair racing
Medal record
Representing Tunisia
Major Marathons
Gold medal – first place	2000 New York City	Marathon
Bronze medal – third place	2001 New York City	Marathon

Kamel Ayari (born 1967/1968) is a wheelchair racer who won the 2000 New York City Marathon, and came third at the 2001 event. Born in Tunisia, Ayari now lives in the United States.

== Personal life ==
Ayari was born in Tunisia. As a child, he contracted polio. In 1999, he moved from Tunis to Huntington, New York, US, in order to train full-time. He later lived in New Rochelle, New York.

== Career ==
In 2000, Ayari won the Lisbon and Marine Corps Marathons; he won the Marine Corps Marathon by over half an hour from five-time winner Ken Carnes who finished second. Later in the year, Ayari won the 2000 New York City Marathon, the first time that the event had held an elite wheelchair race. He overtook handcycle competitor Joe Dowling around 2 miles (3.2 km) from the finish line, near to the Metropolitan Museum of Art. Dowling had led for the first 18 miles (29 km) of the race, and at this event, push-rim wheelchair competitors and handcyclists competed in the same race. Ayari overtook push-rim wheelchair competitor Tony Nogueira, who was the favorite in their class, on the Queensboro Bridge, and Ayari finished in a time of 1:53:50.

Ayari came third at the 2001 New York City Marathon, having raced with Roberto Brigo throughout. Brigo finished second at the event. That year, he won the Falmouth Road Race. In 2002, he won the Broad Street Run in a course record time of 35:11. He also won the 2002 Boilermaker Road Race and came third in that year's Twin Cities Marathon. In 2004, he won the Middletown Road Race, and came second at the Twin Cities Marathon. In 2005, he came second in a 10 km race in Fort Williams Park.
