= Joseph Chirlee =

American long-distance runner

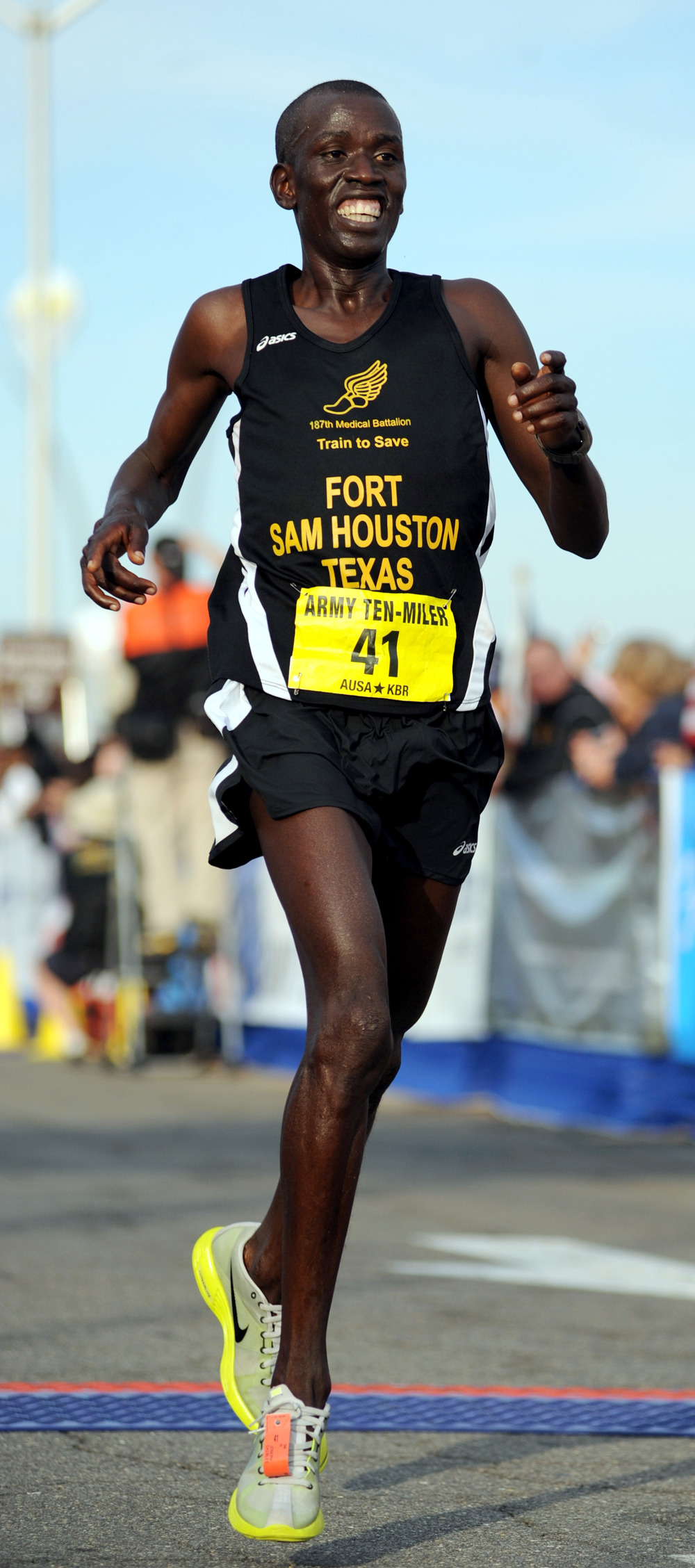
- Chirlee at the 2010 Army Ten-Miler

Personal information
- Born: February 14, 1980 (age 46) Kenya

Sport
- Sport: Athletics
- Event(s): 10,000 m, half-marathon, marathon
- Club: U.S. Army

Achievements and titles
- Personal best(s): 10,000 m – 27:43.96 (2012); HM – 1:02:18 (2006); Mar – 2:15:55 (2008)

Joseph Chirlee (born February 14, 1980)^{[nb]} is an American long-distance runner born in Kenya. Chirlee immigrated to the US in 2006, and became a US citizen in March 2010, but due to IAAF regulations was barred from international competition for two years after that.

In 2007, Chirlee won the Naples Half Marathon. In 2010, Chirlee joined the United States Army as a member of its World Class Athlete Program, where he attempted to compete in the 2011 United States Cross Country Championships, but was barred by USA Track & Field rules.

In 2012, Chirlee ran an Olympic-qualifying 10k time at Wageningen, but he did not make the Olympic team, finishing 16th at the Olympic trials.

== Notes ==
- ^{nb} Some sources list 1981 as his birthdate, although the IAAF lists 1980 and takes information from official passports.
