= Catherine Ndereba =

Kenyan marathon runner (born 1972)

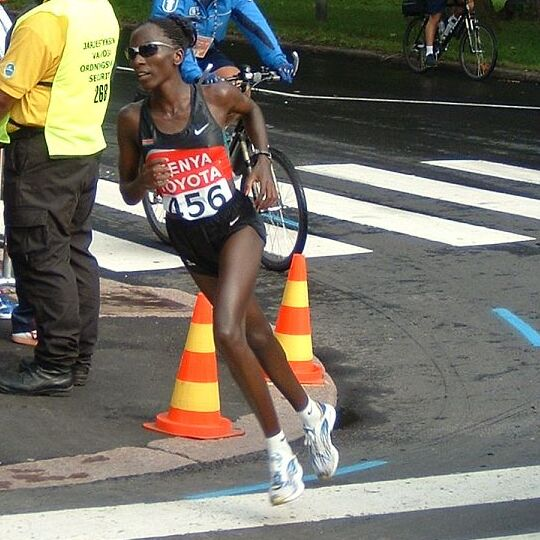
- Ndereba at the 2005 Helsinki Marathon

Personal information
- Born: Wincatherine Nyambura Ndereba; 21 July 1972 (age 54) Nyeri, Kenya
- Height: 1.60 m (5 ft 3 in)
- Weight: 45 kg (99 lb)

Sport
- Country: Kenya
- Sport: Athletics
- Event: Marathon
- Retired: 2008

Achievements and titles
- Personal best: 2:18:47 (Chicago 2001)
Medal record
Women's athletics
Representing Kenya
Olympic Games
Silver medal – second place	2004 Athens	Marathon
Silver medal – second place	2008 Beijing	Marathon
World Championships
Gold medal – first place	2003 Paris	Marathon
Gold medal – first place	2007 Osaka	Marathon
Silver medal – second place	2005 Helsinki	Marathon
World Marathon Majors
Gold medal – first place	2000 Boston	Marathon
Gold medal – first place	2000 Chicago	Marathon
Gold medal – first place	2001 Boston	Marathon
Gold medal – first place	2001 Chicago	Marathon
Gold medal – first place	2004 Boston	Marathon
Gold medal – first place	2005 Boston	Marathon
Silver medal – second place	1999 New York City	Marathon
Silver medal – second place	2002 Boston	Marathon
Silver medal – second place	2002 Chicago	Marathon
Silver medal – second place	2003 London	Marathon
Silver medal – second place	2003 New York City	Marathon
Bronze medal – third place	2006 New York City	Marathon

Catherine Nyambura Ndereba (born 21 July 1972) is a retired Kenyan marathon runner. Between 2003 and 2008, she finished in the top two in five successive global championship marathons. Ndereba has twice won the marathon at the World Championships in Athletics and won silver medals at the Summer Olympic Games in 2004 and 2008, becoming Kenya's first female multi-medalist. She is also a four-time winner of the Boston Marathon and a two-time winner of the Chicago Marathon. It was at the latter in 2001 that she broke the women's marathon world record with a time of 2:18:47.

She retired in 2012 having been described by the Chicago Tribune as the greatest women's marathoner of all time.

== Career ==
Ndereba comes from Gatunganga in Nyeri District, and went to Ngorano Secondary School where she pursued her running career. In 1994, she was recruited into its athletics program by the Kenya Prisons Service. Ndereba was awarded the 2004 and 2005 Kenyan Sportswoman of the Year awards. She was awarded the Order of the Golden Warrior by President Mwai Kibaki in 2005.

Ndereba is a four time Boston Marathon winner between 2000 and 2005.

Ndereba finished seventh at the 2009 London Marathon, equalling Katrin Dorre's record of 21 sub-2:30 hours marathons. She placed third at the Yokohama Women's Marathon later that year, finishing the course in a time of 2:29:13 hours. She did not finish another marathon race until October 2011, when she crossed the line in 2:30:14 hours for third at the Beijing Marathon.

Ndereba decided to retire quietly in 2012. She had problems with the ligaments in her right ankle and she was told that it could be improved by surgery but she wanted to recover naturally. She later made the analogy of a car that needs too many repairs. She retired as the "greatest womens marathoner".

Ndereba, whose nickname is "Catherine the Great", lives in Nairobi with her husband Anthony Maina and daughter Jane. Her brother Samuel and sister Anastasia are also marathon runners.

== Achievements ==
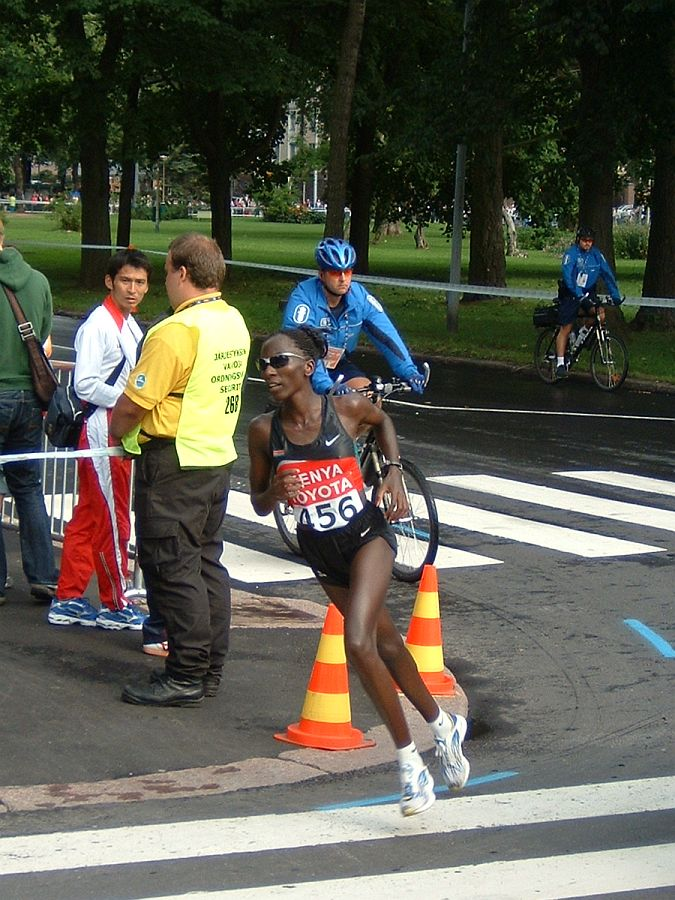
Ndereba competing in the 2005 World Championships marathon.

- 1995
  - Represented Kenya internationally for the first time at a women's relay race in Seoul, South Korea
- 1996
  - Ranked No. 2 in USA Track and Field's World Road Running Rankings; named Road Runner of the Year by Runner's World magazine and Road Racer of the Year by Running Times
- 1997
  - Did not race
  - Gave birth to daughter, Jane.
- 1998
  - Named Road Runner of the Year by Runner's World and Road Racer of the Year by Running Times
  - Won individual bronze and team gold at the IAAF World Half Marathon Championships in Palermo, Italy
  - Ran the world's fastest times for the year at 5 kilometres (15:09), 12 kilometres (38:37), 15 kilometres (48:52), and 10 miles (53:07).
  - Made her marathon debut at the Boston Marathon, finishing sixth in 2:28:27 hours
  - Finished second at the New York City Marathon
- 2000
  - Boston Marathon winner
  - Chicago Marathon winner
  - Named AIMS World Athlete of the Year by the Association of International Marathons and Distance Races
- 2001
  - City-Pier-City Loop (half marathon) winner.
  - Boston Marathon winner
  - Chicago Marathon winner in a world record time
- 2002
  - Finished second at the Boston Marathon. Also finished second at the Chicago Marathon
- 2003
  - World Championships gold medalist in the marathon
  - Sapporo half-marathon winner
  - Finished second at both the New York City Marathon and the London Marathon
- 2004
  - 2004 Summer Olympics, Athens - silver medalist in the marathon
  - Boston Marathon winner
- 2005
  - Boston Marathon winner (the first four-time woman's winner)
  - World Championships silver medalist
- 2006
  - Osaka International Ladies Marathon winner
  - Bogota Half Marathon winner
  - Finished third at the New York City Marathon
- 2007
  - World Championships gold medalist
  - Finished fifth at the New York City Marathon
- 2008
  - 2008 Summer Olympics, Beijing - silver medalist in the marathon
  - Finished fifth at the New York City Marathon
- 2009
  - Finished sixth at the London Marathon
- 2011
  - Finished third at the Beijing International Marathon

== Bibliography ==
- Catherine Ndereba: The Marathon Queen, by Ng’ang’a Mbugua. Sasa Sema Publications, 2008

Records
Preceded by (Japan) Naoko Takahashi	Women's Marathon World Record Holder; 7 October 2001 – 13 October 2002	Succeeded by (United Kingdom) Paula Radcliffe
