= Anke Birnie =

Dutch sculptor

- Born: Anke Rodenburg; 1943 (age 82–83); Doornspijk, Netherlands
- Known for: Sculpture

Anke "Birnie" Rodenburg (born 1943 in Doornspijk) is a Dutch sculptor known for representational figurative bronzes.
