= Reuben Mwei =

Kenyan half marathoner and marathoner (born 1985)

Ruben Mwei
Personal information
- Nationality: Kenyan
- Born: 4 December 1985 (age 40) Kapsabet, Kenya
- Height: 1.8 m (5 ft 11 in)
- Weight: 62 kg (137 lb)

Sport
- Sport: Running
- Events: Half marathon and Marathon

Ruben Chebon Mwei (born 4 December 1985 in Kapsabet, Kenya) is a Kenyan half marathoner and marathoner.

He attended Kemeloi high school and Kamwenja Teacher's College in his native Kenya before moving to the United States to attend Adams State College in 2006, where he majored in psychology.

== Career ==
Mwei redshirted his freshman year at Adams State. His sophomore year, he competed in several cross-country races, including 4- and 5-mile, and 8- and 10-K. He placed second at the NCAA Division II National Championships, with a 30:09 in the 10-K, and earned an All-American award. His junior year, he did not compete in the national championship due to a chest injury.

After college, Mwei has continued to run professionally, winning events such as the 2012 Naples Half Marathon and the 2012 Atlanta Marathon (his debut marathon)
