= 2000 Boston Marathon =

Footrace in Boston, Massachusetts, USA

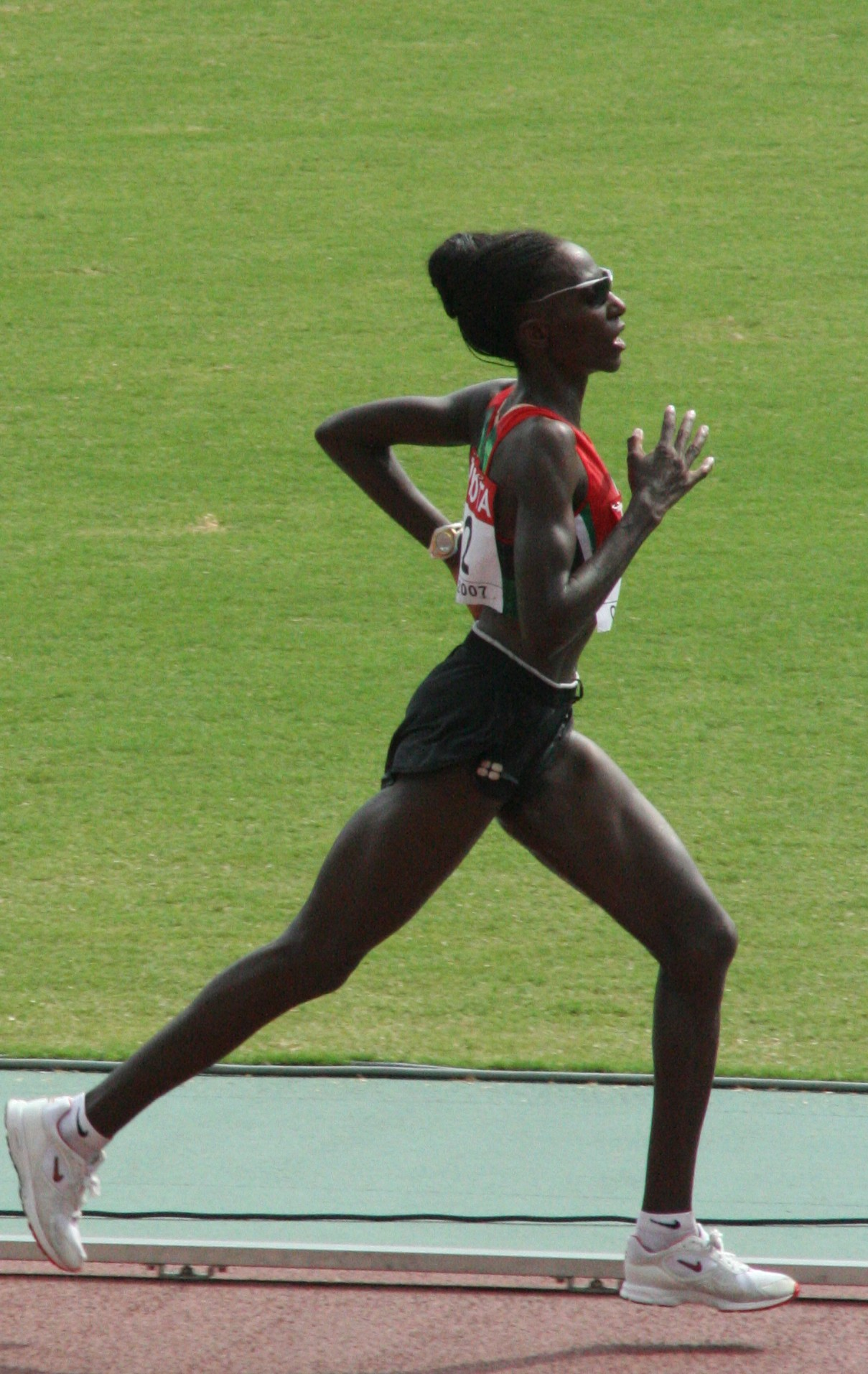
- Women's winner Catherine Ndereba
- Venue: Boston, United States
- Dates: April 17

Champions
- Men: Elijah Lagat (2:09:47)
- Women: Catherine Ndereba (2:26:11)

The 2000 Boston Marathon was the 104th running of the annual marathon race in Boston, United States and was held on April 17. The elite men's race was won by Kenya's Elijah Lagat in a time of 2:09:47 hours and the women's race was won in 2:26:11 by Catherine Ndereba, also Kenyan.

A total of 15,680 people finished the race, 10,207 men and 5473 women.

== Results ==
=== Men ===
| Position | Athlete | Nationality | Time |
|---|---|---|---|
| 1st place, gold medalist(s) | Elijah Lagat | Kenya | 2:09:47 |
| 2nd place, silver medalist(s) | Gezahegne Abera | Ethiopia | 2:09:47 |
| 3rd place, bronze medalist(s) | Moses Tanui | Kenya | 2:09:50 |
| 4 | Ondoro Osoro | Kenya | 2:10:29 |
| 5 | David Busenei | Kenya | 2:11:26 |
| 6 | John Kagwe | Kenya | 2:12:26 |
| 7 | Laban Nkete | South Africa | 2:12:30 |
| 8 | Joseph Chebet | Kenya | 2:12:39 |
| 9 | Julius Rutto | Kenya | 2:13:26 |
| 10 | Silvio Guerra | Ecuador | 2:14:18 |
| 11 | Alejandro Cruz | Mexico | 2:15:09 |
| 12 | Michał Bartoszak | Poland | 2:15:24 |
| 13 | Jackson Kabiga | Kenya | 2:16:13 |
| 14 | Makhosonke Fika | South Africa | 2:16:27 |
| 15 | Ryoji Maeda | Japan | 2:17:04 |

=== Women ===
| Position | Athlete | Nationality | Time |
|---|---|---|---|
| 1st place, gold medalist(s) | Catherine Ndereba | Kenya | 2:26:11 |
| 2nd place, silver medalist(s) | Irina Bogacheva | Kyrgyzstan | 2:26:27 NR |
| 3rd place, bronze medalist(s) | Fatuma Roba | Ethiopia | 2:26:27 |
| 4 | Anuța Cătună | Romania | 2:29:46 |
| 5 | Lornah Kiplagat | Kenya | 2:30:12 |
| 6 | Ai Dongmei | China | 2:30:18 |
| 7 | Ornella Ferrara | Italy | 2:30:20 |
| 8 | Sun Yingjie | China | 2:31:22 |
| 9 | Martha Tenorio | Ecuador | 2:31:49 |
| 10 | Elana Meyer | South Africa | 2:32:09 |
| 11 | Firaya Sultanova-Zhdanova | Russia | 2:32:21 |
| 12 | Renata Paradowska | Poland | 2:33:45 |
| 13 | Gitte Karlshøj | Denmark | 2:35:11 |
| 14 | Annemari Sandell-Hyvärinen | Finland | 2:35:12 |
| 15 | Tatyana Pozdnyakova | Ukraine | 2:35:43 |
