= Anne van Schuppen =

Dutch long-distance runner (born 1960)

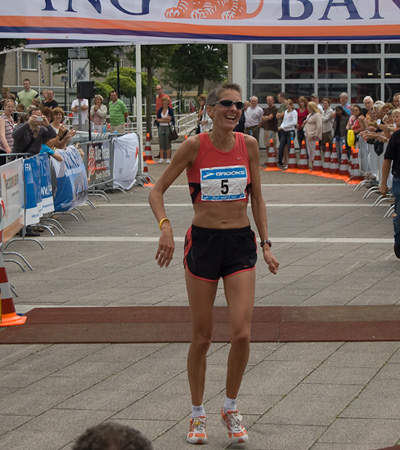
Anne van Schuppen

Antje ("Anne") Elisabeth van Schuppen (born 11 October 1960 in Doornspijk, Gelderland) is a former long-distance runner from the Netherlands, who represented her native country at the 1996 Summer Olympics in Atlanta, Georgia. There she finished in 41st place, clocking 2:40:46. She won the Rotterdam Marathon on 18 April 1993 in a time of 2:34:15. She won the City-Pier-City Loop half marathon in the Hague in 1992.

== Achievements ==
Year	Competition	Venue	Position	Event	Notes
Representing Netherlands
1992	City-Pier-City Loop	The Hague, Netherlands	1st	Half Marathon	1:13:20
1996	Olympic Games	Atlanta, United States	41st	Marathon	2:40:46
2001	Chicago Marathon	Chicago, US	8th	Marathon	2:41:51
