= Tüke =

Tüke Түке
- selo
- Location within Tatarstan
- Country: Russia
- Region: Tatarstan
- District: Aqtanış District
- Time zone: UTC+3:00

Tüke (Tatar: Түке, romanized: Tüke) is a rural locality (a selo) in Aqtanış District, Tatarstan. The population was 421 as of 2010. Tüke is located 40 km from Aqtanış, district's administrative centre, and 328 km from Qazan, republic's capital, by road. The village was established in 17th century. There are 3 streets in the village.
