= Rosa Vecht =

Dutch nurse

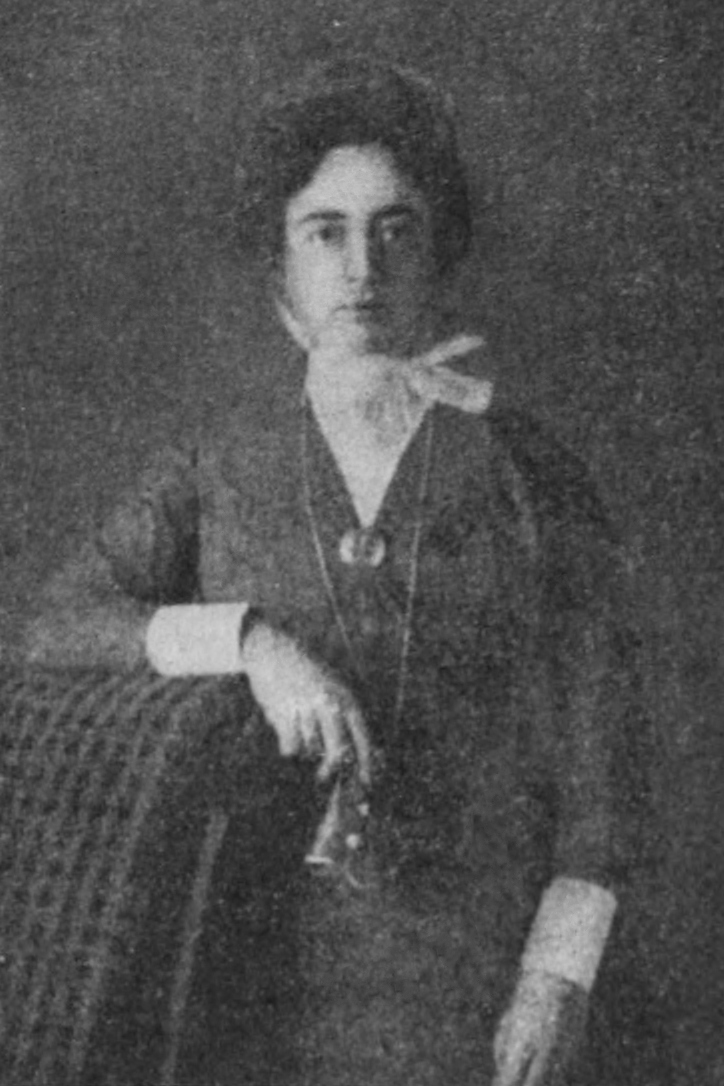
Rosa Vecht, from a 1915 publication.

Rosa Vecht (18 July 1881 – 23 January 1915) was the only Dutch nurse to die in World War I.

== Early life ==
Roosje "Rosa" Vecht was born in Elburg, Gelderland, Netherlands, the eldest child of Mozes Vecht and Diena van Hamberg. Her parents were Jewish.

== Career ==
Vecht trained as a nurse at the Israëlitisch Ziekenhuis (Jewish Hospital) in Rotterdam. She earned her license in 1907 and joined the Nederlandsche Bond voor Ziekenverpleging (Dutch Association for Sick Nursing) in 1908. In 1914, she joined the Belgian Red Cross and worked at the British field hospital at Veurne. Marie Curie worked at the same hospital.

== Personal life ==
Vecht died in 1915, aged 33 years, when she was fatally injured by shrapnel at Veurne in West Flanders, while saying goodbye before a planned evacuation. She died after an operation to amputate her leg at De Panne. She was the only known Dutch nurse to die during World War I. Her remains were buried with military honours at Adinkerke Military Cemetery, and reinterred in 1920, in the Jewish cemetery in Muiderberg. In 2015, to mark the 100th anniversary of her death, Vecht was remembered in a ceremony at the Menin Gate in Ypres.
