= Doornspijk =

- Village
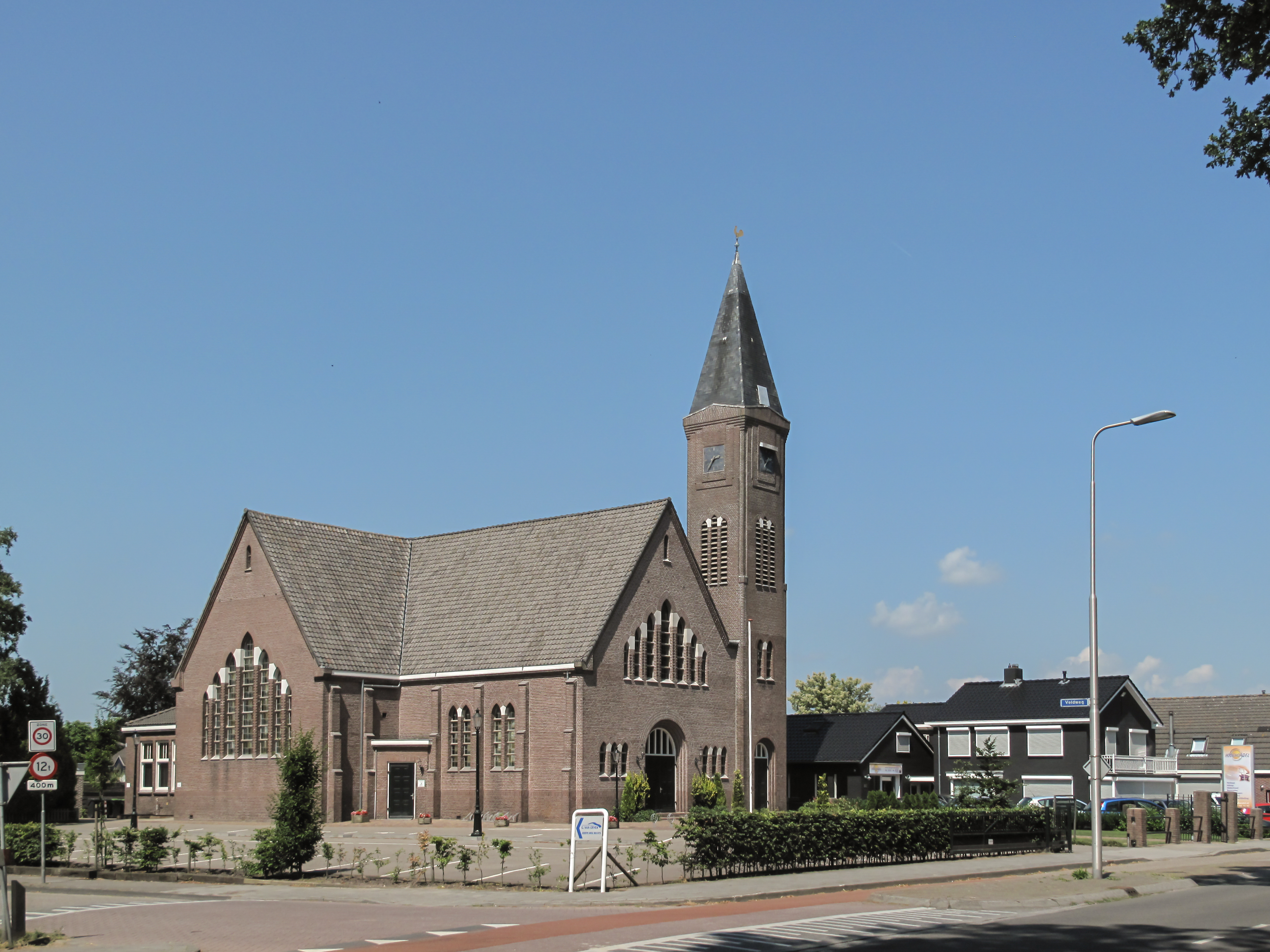
- Doornspijk, reformed church

- Coat of arms

- Location in the province of Gelderland in the Netherlands Doornspijk (Netherlands)
- Coordinates: 52°25′9″N 5°48′58″E
- Country: Netherlands Netherlands
- Province: Gelderland
- Municipality: Elburg

Area
  - Total: 19.93 km^{2} (7.70 sq mi)
- Elevation: 2.9 m (9.5 ft)

Population (2021)
  - Total: 3,330
  - Density: 167/km^{2} (433/sq mi)
- Time zone: UTC+1 (CET)
  - Summer (DST): UTC+2 (CEST)
- Postal code: 8085
- Dialing code: 0525

Doornspijk is a village in the Dutch province of Gelderland. It is located in the municipality of Elburg.

The village was first mentioned in 796 as Thornspiiic, and is a combination of thorn and tapering land. The original village was flooded by the former Zuiderzee in 1825, and current village formed around the church after 1829.

The Dutch Reformed church was built in 1829, and was extended into a cruciform church in 1950. Doornspijk was home to 540 people in 1840.

Doornspijk was a separate municipality until 1974, when it became a part of Elburg.

== Notable people from Doornspijk ==
- Didericus Heineken (1730-1795), a minister of the Dutch Reformed Church, and his wife Theodora Segerina van Lom, ancestors of Freddy Heineken
- Anne van Schuppen (born 1960), long-distance runner
- Duncan Huisman (born 1971), racing car driver
- Anke Birnie (born 1943), sculptor
