= Ben Kimondiu =

Kenyan long-distance runner

Benedict Muli Kimondiu (born 30 November 1977) is a Kenyan former marathon runner. Kimondiu began running marathons as a pacesetter when he finished the 2000 New York City Marathon in sixteenth place. The following year, Kimondiu became the first ever pacesetter to win at the Chicago Marathon. In further marathons, Kimondiu competed at the Boston Marathon in 2002 and resumed his Chicago appearances in 2002 and 2003. After a third place finish at the 2004 Tokyo International Marathon, Kimondiu did not finish the New York City Marathon that year. A few years later, Kimondiu ran at the 2006 Tokyo International Marathon and 2007 Tokyo Marathon, but did not complete either marathon. Kimondiu's last marathon was at the 2012 Hong Kong Marathon, where he came in fifteenth place.

== Early life ==
Kimondiu was born on 30 November 1977 and spent his childhood in Kilungu, Kenya. Growing up, Kimondiu became an athlete while completing his primary education.

== Career ==
Kimondiu began his athletic career at the Cherry Blossom Ten Mile Run in Washington, D.C. As a pacesetter, Kimondiu finished sixteenth at the 2000 New York City Marathon and first at the 2001 Chicago Marathon. Kimondiu's 2001 win made him the first ever pacesetter to finish first at the Chicago Marathon. After the marathon, race director Carey Pinkowski said Kimondiu would be permitted to keep all of the money he won at Chicago as a pacesetter. In subsequent marathons, Kimondiu was twenty-sixth at the 2002 Boston Marathon, eleventh at the 2002 Chicago Marathon and thirteenth at the 2003 Chicago Marathon. Kimondiu's only other top eight performance in major marathons was a third place finish at the 2004 Tokyo International Marathon. In later marathons, Kimondiu did not finish the 2004 New York City Marathon, 2006 Tokyo International Marathon and 2007 Tokyo Marathon. Kimondiu's final marathon was at the 2012 Hong Kong Marathon, where he finished in fifteenth place.
