= Firaya Sultanova-Zhdanova =

Russian long-distance runner

Personal information
- Born: April 29, 1961 (age 64) Tyukovo, Tatarstan

Sport
- Country: Russia
- Sport: long-distance running

Firaya Rifkatovna Sultanova-Zhdanova (Russian: Фирая Рифкатовна Султанова-Жданова; born April 29, 1961, in Tyukovo, Tatarstan) is a retired female long-distance runner from Russia. She set her personal best in the women's marathon on June 21, 2003, in Duluth, Minnesota, clocking 2:27:05. Sultanova represented Russia at the 1996 Summer Olympics in Atlanta, Georgia, where she failed to reach the final of the women's 10,000 metres competition.

== International competitions ==
Representing Russia
| Year | Competition | Venue | Position | Event | Result | Notes |
|---|---|---|---|---|---|---|
| 1993 | World Championships | Stuttgart, Germany | 10th | Marathon | 2:37:59 | |
| 1994 | European Championships | Helsinki, Finland | 12th | Marathon | 2:36:50 | |
| 1999 | World Championships | Seville, Spain | 14th | Marathon | 2:30:45 | |
| 2001 | World Championships | Edmonton, Canada | 12th | Marathon | 2:30:58 | |

== Professional marathons ==
| Year | Competition | Venue | Position | Result | Notes |
|---|---|---|---|---|---|
| 2000 | 2000 Boston Marathon | Boston, United States | 11th | 2:32:21 | |
| 2000 | Omsk Marathon | Omsk, Russia | 2nd | 2:36:07 | |
| 2003 | Grandma's Marathon | Duluth, United States | 1st | 2:27:05 | |
| 2004 | Grandma's Marathon | Duluth, United States | 1st | 2:35:08 | |
| 2006 | Houston Marathon | Houston, United States | 1st | 2:32:25 | |
| 2007 | Houston Marathon | Houston, United States | 3rd | 2:39:06 | |
| 2008 | 2008 Boston Marathon | Boston, United States | 13th | 2:47:17 | |
