= Elly Rono =

Kenyan marathon runner

Elly Rono (born May 5, 1970) is a former Kenyan long-distance runner. Rono attended the University of Southern Indiana where he was an NCAA Division II champion in cross country, the indoor 5,000 metres, and the outdoor 10,000 metres. He is a two-time winner of the California International Marathon.

== Achievements ==
Year	Competition	Venue	Position	Event	Notes
Representing Kenya
1999	Flying Pig Marathon	Cincinnati, United States	1st	Marathon	2:21:15
2000	California International Marathon	Sacramento, United States	1st	Marathon	2:15:38
2001	Pittsburgh Marathon	Pittsburgh, United States	1st	Marathon	2:17:15
2001	Naples Half Marathon	Naples, Florida, United States	1st	Half-marathon	1:04:56
2002	Grandma's Marathon	Duluth, United States	1st	Marathon	2:10:57
2002	Richmond Marathon	Richmond, United States	1st	Marathon	2:16:02
2002	California International Marathon	Sacramento, United States	1st	Marathon	2:11:56
2003	Richmond Marathon	Richmond, United States	1st	Marathon	2:15:36
2003	Naples Half Marathon	Naples, Florida, United States	1st	Half-marathon	1:04:56
2004	National Capital Marathon	Ottawa, Canada	1st	Marathon	2:11:47.4
2004	Richmond Marathon	Richmond, United States	1st	Marathon	2:17:55
