= Helene Hines =

Helene Hines is a handcyclist who has competed in numerous marathons. Hines was diagnosed with multiple sclerosis at the age of 30 and was told that she should give up walking. She went on to compete in 27 marathons in the handcycle division between 1988 and 1999. Hines was the women's handcycle winner at the 2000, 2001, 2002 and 2010 New York City Marathons.

Hines ran with President Bill Clinton in 1994 in commemoration of the Americans with Disabilities Act, and won 24 biking marathons in her division between 2000 and March 2013. In 2003, Hines became the first disabled person to be inducted into the National Jewish Sports Hall of Fame and Museum. She received the Woman of Valor award in 2004 from the East Meadow Jewish Center. Hines is an active member of Achilles International and a physical education instructor. Her book, Third in the World, was published in 2011.
