= Esther Kiplagat =

Kenyan long-distance runner (born 1966)

Personal information
- Nationality: Kenyan
- Born: 8 December 1966 (age 59)

Sport
- Sport: Long-distance running
- Event: 3000 metres

Esther Kiplagat (born 8 December 1966) is a Kenyan long-distance runner. She competed in the women's 3000 metres at the 1992 Summer Olympics.

Kiplagat competed for the Jackson State Lady Tigers track and field team in the NCAA.
