= Madrid Marathon =

Marathon running race held in Madrid, Spain

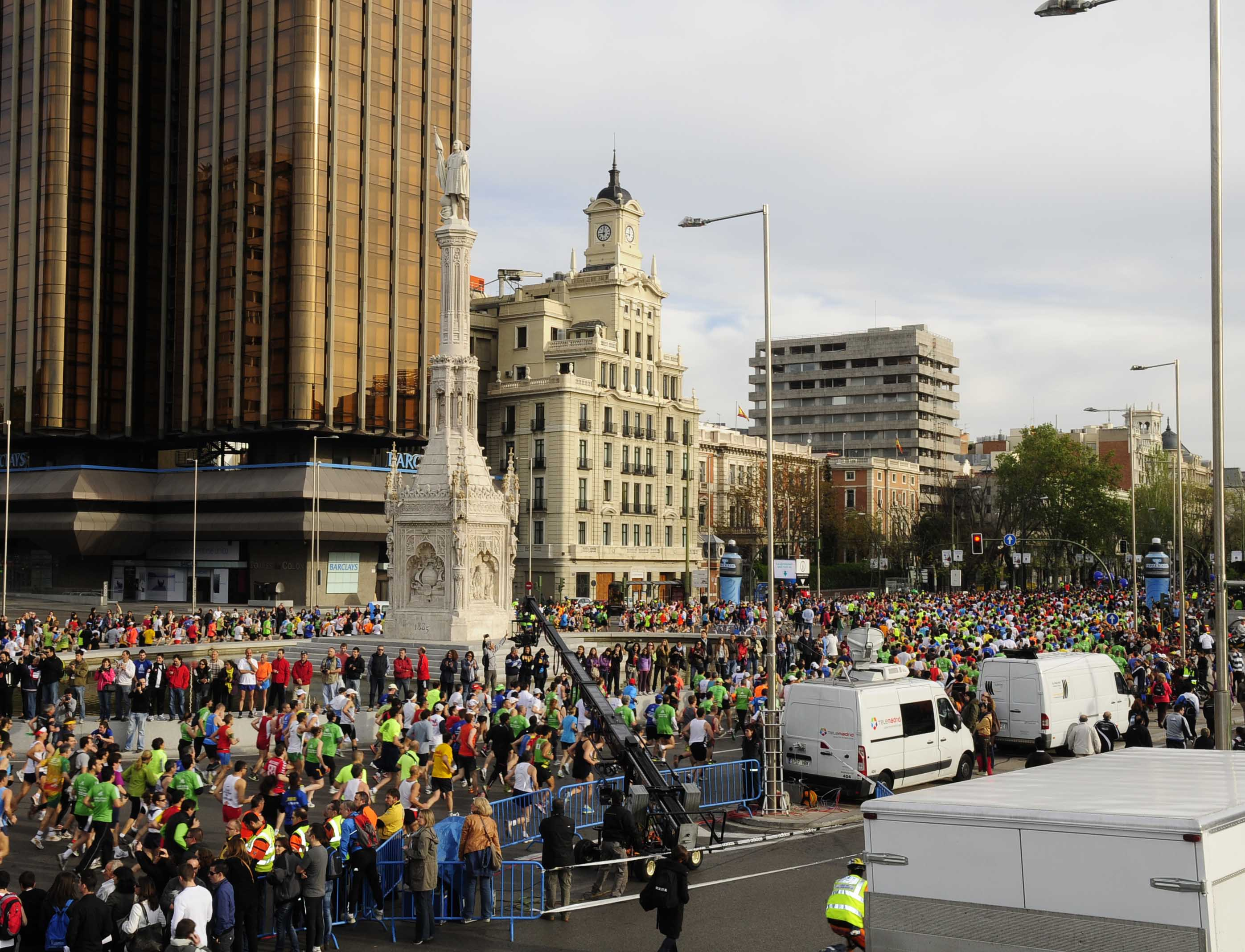
- Madrid Marathon 2016
- Date: Late April
- Location: Madrid, Spain
- Event type: Road
- Distance: Marathon, Half marathon, 10k run
- Primary sponsor: Zurich
- Established: 1978 (48 years ago)
- Course records: Men's: 2:08:18 (2019) (Kenya) Reuben Kerio; Women's: 2:24:37 (2022) (Ethiopia) Siranesh Yirga
- Website: Madrid Marathon
- Participants: 7,405 finishers (2023); 5,824 finishers (2022); 3,207 finishers (2021); 8,106 (2019)

The Rock 'n' Roll Madrid Marathon (Spanish: Maratón de Rock 'n' Roll Madrid) is an annual marathon race which takes place in Madrid, Spain, in late April. The event was first held in 1978 and has since gained IAAF Gold Label Road Race status and had over 15,000 runners participate in the 2017 edition. A 10 km road race was added in 2010 and a Half Marathon road race was added in 2012.

The race course begins near Paseo de Recoletos and heads north past the Biblioteca Nacional de España, then the Santiago Bernabéu Stadium. After 8 kilometres the route turns southwards and heads back towards Nuevos Ministerios. Runners then follow a twisting south-westerly route. After passing Plaza Mayor, it goes north past the Royal Palace of Madrid and reaches the half marathon mark at Parque del Oeste.

After exiting the park, it traces a path south for a few kilometres and includes a six-kilometre loop within Casa de Campo. After a section which loops back south and north, the course heads east, uphill towards Madrid Atocha railway station. It runs along the perimeter of Buen Retiro Park and finishes inside the park at Paseo del Duque de Fernán Nuñez. The combination of an undulating course, the last 10 km approximately uphill, and the altitude of the city has made it difficult for runners to produce fast marathon times. The course is AIMS-certified and is eligible for record performances. The course records are 2:08:18 for the men's race (set by Reuben Kerio in 2019) and 2:24:37 for the women's race (set by Siranesh Yirga in 2022).

Competitor Group, Inc., an American organiser of the Rock 'n' Roll Marathon series, partnered with local Mapoma Club in April 2011, making it Competitor's first event outside the United States.

The 2020 edition of the race was cancelled due to the coronavirus pandemic, with all registrants given the option of transferring their entry to 2021, 2022, or 2023, or obtaining a refund (minus management fees). (Note: It had initially been postponed to 15 November 2020 before being cancelled.)

== Past winners ==
=== Marathon ===
Key: Course record Country's championship race

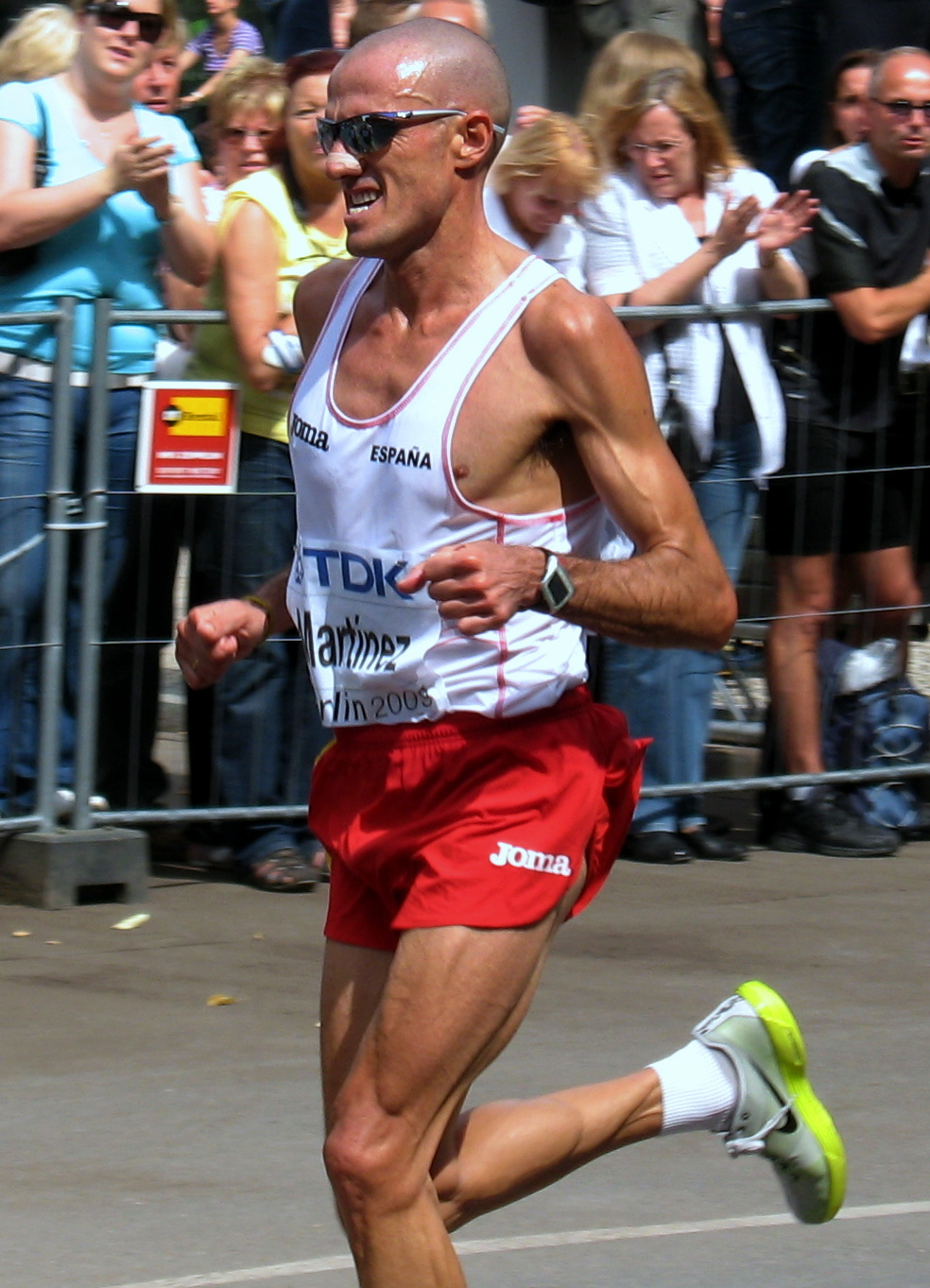
Madrid-born José Manuel Martínez won the 2008 men's race

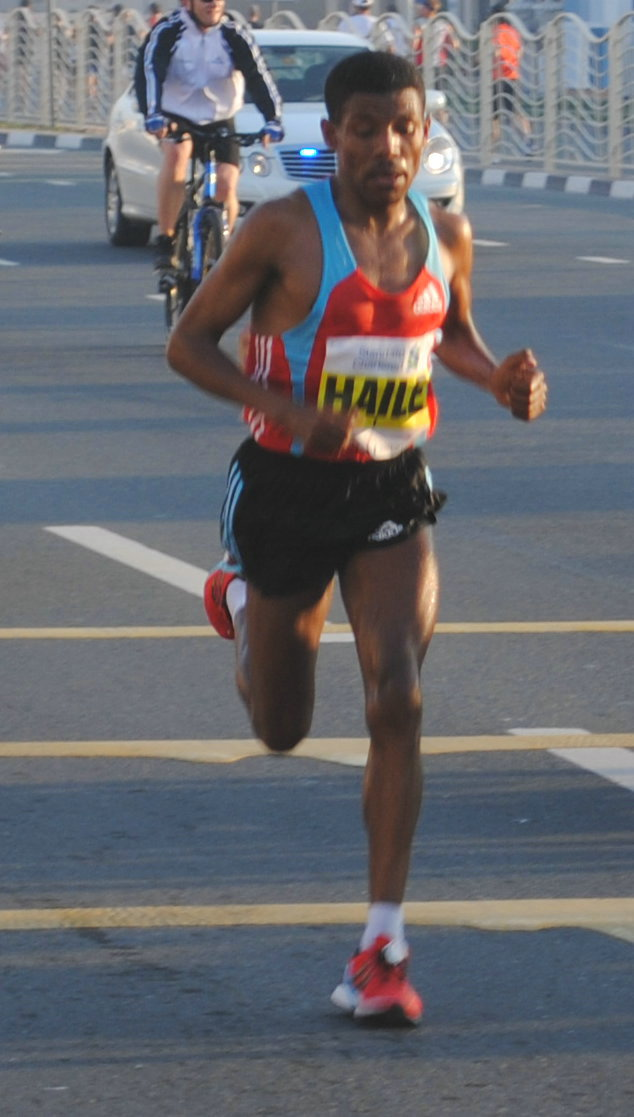
Haile Gebrselassie won the inaugural 10K race in 2010

Edition	Year	Men's winner	Time (h:m:s)	Women's winner	Time (h:m:s)
48th	2026	Mike Chematot (KEN)	2:08:46	Kena Girma (ETH)	2:26:00
47th	2025	Derara Hurisa (ETH)	2:09:11	Maritu Ketema (ETH)	2:25:55
46th	2024	Miktu Tafa (ETH)	2:08:57	Naom Jebet (KEN)	2:26:20
45th	2023	Geofrey Kusuro (UGA)	2:10:29	Doreen Chesang (UGA)	2:26:31
44th	2022	Abdela Godana (ETH)	2:08:44	Siranesh Yirga (ETH)	2:24:37
43rd	2021	Abdela Godana (ETH)	2:10:14	Kasu Bitew (ETH)	2:29:08
42nd	2019	Reuben Kerio (KEN)	2:08:18	Shasho Insermu (ETH)	2:26:24
41st	2018	Eliud Barngetuny (KEN)	2:10:15	Valentine Kipketer (KEN)	2:30:40
40th	2017	Bonsa Dida (ETH)	2:10:16	Elizabeth Rumokol (KEN)	2:33:55
39th	2016	Peter Kiplagat (KEN)	2:11:44	Askale Alemayehu (ETH)	2:33:08
38th	2015	Ezekiel Chebii (KEN)	2:12:00	Monica Jepkoech (KEN)	2:33:42
37th	2014	Ezekiel Chebii (KEN)	2:09:15	Alem Frike (ETH)	2:32:11
36th	2013	Francis Kiprop (KEN)	2:10:37	Vanessa Veiga (ESP)	2:36:38
35th	2012	Patrick Korir (KEN)	2:12:07	Margaret Agai (KEN)	2:32:23
34th	2011	Moses Arusei (KEN)	2:10:58	Desta Tadesse (ETH)	2:35:28
33rd	2010	Thomson Cherogony (KEN)	2:11:27	Desta Tadesse (ETH)	2:34:39
32nd	2009	Khalid Yaseen (BHR)	2:14:31	Mehtap Doğan-Sızmaz (TUR)	2:32:04
31st	2008	José Manuel Martínez (ESP)	2:12:42	Rael Nguriatukei (KEN)	2:36:15
30th	2007	Jonathan Kibet (KEN)	2:12:42	Pauline Chepkorir (KEN)	2:48:46
29th	2006	Joseph Ngolepus (KEN)	2:11:30	Banuelia Katesigwa (TAN)	2:34:54
28th	2005	Daniel Rono (KEN)	2:12:29	Larissa Malikova (RUS)	2:33:27
27th	2004	Joseph Kahugu (KEN)	2:15:14	Florence Barsosio (KEN)	2:34:10
26th	2003	Henry Tarus (KEN)	2:12:42	Ruth Kutol (KEN)	2:34:41
25th	2002	Daniel Too (KEN)	2:16:11	Mariela González (CUB)	2:50:49
24th	2001	José Ramón Rey (ESP)	2:19:12	Mariela González (CUB)	2:44:18
23rd	2000	John Miaka (KEN)	2:16:05	Marina Pilyavina (RUS)	2:39:33
22nd	1999	Thomas Magut (KEN)	2:17:45	Irene Kipkorir (KEN)	2:45:40
21st	1998	Fekadu Bekele (ETH)	2:17:59	Josefa Cruz (ESP)	2:39:11
20th	1997	Alberto Cuba (CUB)	2:16:01	Sergia Martínez (CUB)	2:47:16
19th	1996	Sergei Struganov (RUS)	2:19:26	Montserrat Martínez (ESP)	2:48:16
18th	1995	Juan Antonio Crespo (ESP)	2:19:20	Alina Gubeyeva (RUS)	2:48:54
17th	1994	Abdelkader El Mouaziz (MAR)	2:17:39	Marina Ivanova (RUS)	2:43:52
16th	1993	Martin Vrábeľ (SVK)	2:16:13	Alzira Lario (POR)	2:43:28
15th	1992	Nada Saktay (TAN)	2:14:17	Yekaterina Khramenkova (BLR)	2:35:30
14th	1991	John Burra (TAN)	2:12:19	Fabiola Rueda-Oppliger (SUI)	2:38:45
13th	1990	Jose Cesar de Souza (BRA)	2:14:24	Marina Prat (ESP)	2:37:14
12th	1989	Jose Cesar de Souza (BRA)	2:15:16	Elena Cobos (ESP)	2:41:14
11th	1988	Juan Antonio García (ESP)	2:14:32	Czesława Mentlewicz (POL)	2:37:19
10th	1987	José Ángel Zapata (VEN)	2:20:38	Mercedes Calleja (ESP)	2:41:46
9th	1986	Ramiro Matamoros (ESP)	2:17:04	Consuelo Alonso (ESP)	2:43:21
8th	1985	Antonio Cánovas (ESP)	2:22:31	Joaquina Casas (ESP)	2:48:55
7th	1984	Carmona Páez (ESP)	2:20:43	Catherine Bayle (FRA)	2:58:19
6th	1983	Francisco Medina (ESP)	2:21:33	April Powers (USA)	2:51:52
5th	1982	Roberto García (ESP)	2:19:30	Inez McLean (GBR)	2:50:23
4th	1981	Odis Sanders (USA)	2:19:44	Gillian Adams (GBR)	2:57:50
3rd	1980	Raúl Llusá (ARG)	2:24:43	Victoria García (ESP)	3:29:50
2nd	1979	Vicente Polo (ESP)	2:23:14	Julia Martín (ESP)	3:31:26
1st	1978	Juan Manuel Sánchez (ESP)	2:24:49	Matilde Gómez (ESP)	3:35:47

=== 10K de Madrid ===
Edition	Year	Men's winner	Time (m:s)	Women's winner	Time (m:s)
16th	2026	Adam Maijó (ESP)	29:59	Águeda Marqués (ESP)	33:14
15th	2025	Adam Maijó (ESP)	29:12	Águeda Marqués (ESP)	32:45
14th	2024	Carlos Mayo (ESP)	29:10	Águeda Marqués (ESP)	33:31
13th	2023	Carlos Mayo (ESP)	30:11	Águeda Marqués (ESP)	32:41
12th	2022	Carlos Mayo (ESP)	29:33	Águeda Marqués (ESP)	33:09
11th	2021	Carlos Mayo (ESP)	29:37	Marta Pérez (ESP)	34:43
10th	2019	Carlos Mayo (ESP)	29:54	Irene Sánchez-Escribano (ESP)	34:01
9th	2018	Sergio Salinero (ESP)	30:52	Ana Lozano (ESP)	35:33
8th	2017	Carlos Mayo (ESP)	30:34	Mélanie Doutart (FRA)	36:36
7th	2016	Carlos Mayo (ESP)	30:53	Isabel Macías (ESP)	37:01
6th	2015	José Manuel Abascal (ESP)	31:52	Diana Martín (ESP)	34:59
5th	2014	Arturo Casado (ESP)	31:07	Isabel Macías (ESP)	36:02
4th	2013	Arturo Casado (ESP)	30:22	Marta Silvestre (ESP)	35:03
3rd	2012	Carles Castillejo (ESP)	30:01	Vanessa Veiga (ESP)	34:57
2nd	2011	Joseph Kipkosgei (KEN)	28:59	Sara Moreira (POR)	32:33
1st	2010	Haile Gebrselassie (ETH)	28:56	Nazha Machrouh (MAR)	34:17

== Statistics ==
Note: Marathon statistics only (Updated 26 April 2026)

=== Winners by country ===
Country	Men's race	Women's race	Total
Kenya	18	10	28
Spain	11	11	22
Ethiopia	6	9	15
Russia	1	4	5
Cuba	1	3	4
Tanzania	2	1	3
Brazil	2	0	2
Great Britain	0	2	2
United States	1	1	2
Uganda	1	1	2
Argentina	1	0	1
Bahrain	1	0	1
Morocco	1	0	1
Slovakia	1	0	1
Venezuela	1	0	1
Belarus	0	1	1
France	0	1	1
Poland	0	1	1
Portugal	0	1	1
Switzerland	0	1	1
Turkey	0	1	1

=== Multiple winners ===
Athlete	Country	Wins	Years
Abdela Godana	Ethiopia	2	2021, 2022
Ezekiel Chebii	Kenya	2	2014, 2015
Desta Girma	Ethiopia	2	2010, 2011
Mariela González	Cuba	2	2001, 2002
José Cesar de Souza	Brazil	2	1989, 1990

== See also ==
- Barcelona Marathon
- Valencia Marathon
- Seville Marathon
- Madrid Half Marathon
