= Generali Central Insurance =

Indian insurance company founded in 2006

Generali Central Insurance Company Limited (GCICL)
- Formerly: Future Generali India Insurance
- Type: Private
- Industry: Financial services
- Founded: 2006; 20 years ago
- Headquarters: Mumbai, India
- Key people: Anup Rau (MD & CEO)
- Products: Health insurance Motor insurance Travel insurance Home insurance Lifestyle Insurance; Commercial insurance Social/Rural Insurance
- Total assets: ₹ 5726.28 (2022)
- Owner: Generali Group; Central Bank of India
- Parent: Generali Group; Central Bank of India
- Website: Official website

Generali Central Insurance Company Limited (GCICL) (formally known as Future Generali India Insurance Company Limited (FGII)) is a private general insurance company based in India. It is a joint venture between Generali Group and Central Bank of India.

In June 2025, the Central Bank of India acquired a 24.91% stake in Future Generali India Insurance Company Limited for ₹451 crore.

== History ==
Originally established in 2006, the company received ISO 9001:2008 certification in 2013 and ISO 27001:2013 certification in 2014. It has partenered with India banks like Bank of Maharashtra, UCO Bank, and Bank of India to provide insurance products such as motor, home, health, and rural insurance.

In May 2022, Generali acquired an additional 25 percent stake in Generali Central Insurance from Future Enterprises, increasing its overall shareholding to 74 percent.

The company provides a mobile application, FG Insure, which includes functions such as policy management, insurance renewal, and claim reporting. In 2016, the company launched i-MoSS, a digital tool used by motor claim surveyors.

The Reserve Bank of India has approved Central Bank of India's insurance sector entry via a joint venture with Future Generali India Insurance and Future Generali India Life. With a Rs 508 crore investment, the bank acquired a 24.91% stake in FGIICL and 25.18% in FILICL, The bank also got IRDAI approvals to get into joint venture.

== Financials ==
The company reported its Gross Written Premium of ₹4,210.35 crore in the financial year 2021–22, while in FY 2020–21, it was ₹3,898.91 crore, a growth of 8%. The company reported a solvency ratio of 166% in FY 2021–22. The Net Promoter Score (NPS), of the company stood at 59.4 in FY 2021–2022.

== CSR initiatives ==
In 2018, GCICL adopted The Human Safety Net (THSN), a CSR initiative focused on community-based support programs. The company has collaborated with United Way Mumbai to support children from disadvantaged communities. It also donated 8,500 masks to the Brihanmumbai Municipal Corporation, as part of a campaign promoting mental health awareness.

== Awards and recognition ==
- 2022 Golden Peacock Award for Excellence in Corporate Governance. In *2021 BFSI Silver Medal by The Economic Times.
