= 1992 Chicago Marathon =

Footrace held in Chicago, Illinois

15th Chicago Marathon
- Venue: Chicago, United States
- Dates: October 25

Champions
- Men: José Cesar de Souza (2:16:14)
- Women: Linda Somers (2:37:41)

The 1992 Chicago Marathon was the 15th running of the annual marathon race in Chicago, United States and was held on October 25. The elite men's race was won by Brazil's José Cesar de Souza in a time of 2:16:14 hours and the women's race was won by home athlete Linda Somers in 2:37:41.

== Results ==
=== Men ===
Position	Athlete	Nationality	Time
1	José Cesar de Souza	Brazil	2:16:14
2	Igor Braslawsky	Ukraine	2:17:30
3	Eddy Hellebuyck	Belgium	2:17:55
4	Thomas O'Gara	Ireland	2:18:05
5	Tomasz Gnabel	Poland	2:18:18
6	Roy Dooney	Ireland	2:18:49
7	Terefe Mekonnen	Ethiopia	2:20:25
8	Tadeusz Ławicki	Poland	2:20:28
9	Visa Orttenvuori	Finland	2:20:39
10	Kassa Balcha	Ethiopia	2:22:51

=== Women ===
Position	Athlete	Nationality	Time
1	Linda Somers	United States	2:37:41
2	Gail Hall	United States	2:39:38
3	Kirsi Valasti	Finland	2:40:32
4	Ursula Noctor	Ireland	2:41:52
5	Emma Cabrera	Mexico	2:45:36
6	Betsy Schmid	United States	2:46:49
7	Catriona Dowling	Ireland	2:50:24
8	Renata Sitek	Austria	2:52:14
9	Sandra Natal	Dominican Republic	2:57:09
