= Kevin Dooney =

Irish long-distance runner

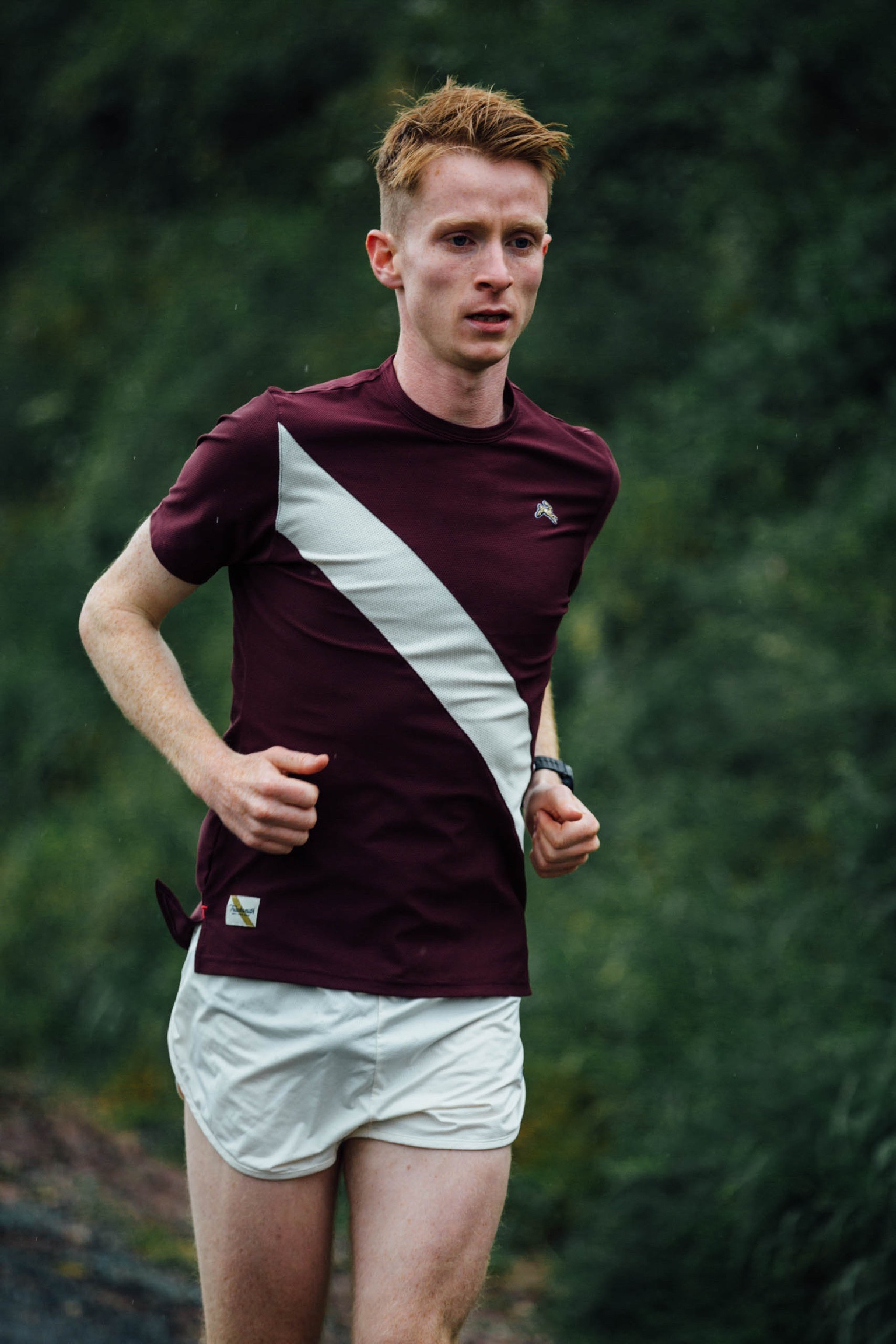

Personal information
- Born: 7 July 1993 (age 32)

Sport
- Country: Ireland
- Sport: Long-distance running

Kevin Dooney (born 7 July 1993) is an Irish long-distance runner.

He won the 2018 Irish Life Health National Senior Cross Country Championship. He competed in the men's half marathon at the 2018 IAAF World Half Marathon Championships held in Valencia, Spain. He finished in 135th place. In 2019, he competed in the senior men's race at the 2019 IAAF World Cross Country Championships held in Aarhus, Denmark. He finished in 105th place..

His father Roy was an Irish cross country and marathon runner, who finished second in the 1991 Chicago Marathon.
