= Siranesh Yirga =

Ethiopian long-distance runner and marathon winner

Personal information
- Nationality: Ethiopian
- Born: 11 September 2000 (age 26)

Sport
- Sport: Athletics
- Events: Long-distance running, Marathon

Siranesh Yirga (born 11 September 2000) is an Ethiopian long-distance runner who specializes in the marathon and half marathon. She has won several international marathons, including Lagos, Ljubljana, and Shanghai.

== Career ==
Siranesh Yirga made a strong debut in the marathon distance in 2022. She won the Lagos City Marathon in February 2022, clocking 2:33:50. Later that year, in October, she significantly improved her personal best by winning the Ljubljana Marathon in a time of 2:21:08. She also secured a win at the Madrid Marathon in 2022, recording a time of 2:24:37.

In 2023, Yirga continued her impressive form, finishing third at the Dubai Marathon with a time of 2:21:08. Her most significant victory of the year came in November, when she won the Shanghai Marathon, a World Athletics Platinum Label road race, in 2:21:28.

In early 2024, she achieved a new personal best in the half marathon at the Ras Al Khaimah Half Marathon, running 1:08:13.

== Personal bests ==
- Marathon – 2:21:08 (Ljubljana, 23 October 2022)
- Half Marathon – 1:08:13 (Ras Al Khaimah, 25 February 2024)
- 10 Kilometres Road – 33:20 (27 May 2024)
