= Ezekiel Kiptoo Chebii =

Kenyan long-distance runner (born 1991)

Ezekiel Kiptoo Chebii (born 3 January 1991) is a Kenyan long-distance runner who competes in half marathon and marathon races. He has personal bests of 59:05 minutes and 2:09:15 hours, respectively. His half marathon best ranks him among the top twenty all-time for the distance. He has won the Madrid Marathon and the Lille Half Marathon, both in course record times.

== Career ==
He first began competing in Europe in 2009, while still a teenager. He placed fifth at the Utrecht Singelloop that year. He was fourth at the Paderborn 10K in 2010, dipping under 28 minutes for the distance for the first time and ranking in the global top 40.

Chebii stepped up to the half marathon distance in 2011 and set a best of 61:40 minutes at the Nice Half Marathon. He also placed in the top eight at the Portugal Half Marathon and Giro di Castelbuono.

He established himself among the world's top road runners in 2012. He ran the half marathon in under an hour for the first time at the Berlin Half Marathon, taking third in 59:22 minutes. He broke the Lille Half Marathon course record with a run of 59:05 minutes that September. This time ranked him fourth in the world for that season, and also raised him into the top twenty of all time for the distance. He served as pacemaker for the Amsterdam Marathon (which resulted in a course record),

After this high, he struggled to capture the same form, taking tenth at the Marseille-Cassis Classique Internationale, twelfth at the RAK Half Marathon, and fifth at the CPC Half Marathon. He began to take on longer distances, serving pacing duties at the 2013 Rotterdam Marathon up to the 30 km mark.

The 2014 Lisbon Half Marathon (third in 60:50 minutes) was his preparation for his marathon debut, which he ran a course record of 2:09.15 hours to top the podium at the Madrid Marathon. His next attempt at the marathon was less convincing – 2:13:14 for 17th in Dubai.

== Personal bests ==
- 5000 metres – 13:54.48 min (2009)
- 10K run – 27:54 (2010)
- Half marathon – 59:05 (2012)
- Marathon – 2:07:18 (2015)
