= Lemi Berhanu Hayle =

Ethiopian long-distance runner

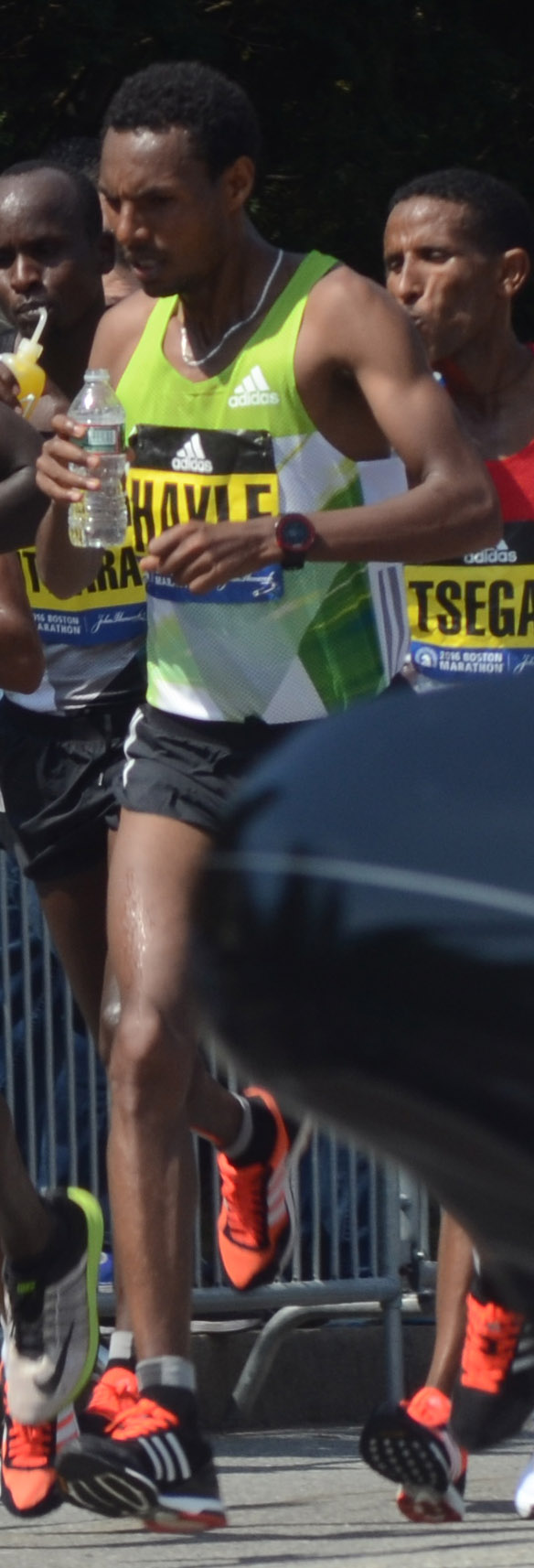
- Berhanu Lemi Hayle, winner of the 2016 Boston Marathon approaching halfway point

Personal information
- Born: 13 September 1994 (age 32)

Sport
- Country: Ethiopia
- Sport: Men's athletics
- Event: Marathon

Achievements and titles
- Personal bests: Marathon: 2:03:33 (2026); Half marathon: 1:01:37 (2015)

Lemi Berhanu Hayle, also known as Berhanu Lemi, (Amharic: ለሚ ብርሃኑ ኃይሌ; born 13 September 1994) is an Ethiopian long-distance runner who specialises in the marathon. He competed in the marathon event at the 2015 World Championships in Athletics in Beijing, China, placing 15th. His personal best of 2:04:33 hours, set in 2015, ranks him in the world's top 15 athletes for the distance (as of 2016). In April 2016, he won the Boston Marathon.

== Career ==
Lemi ran his debut marathon in 2014 and his time of 2:10:40 hours made him the winner at the Zürich Marathon. The following year he entered the Dubai Marathon and surprised the high quality field by winning in a time of 2:05:28 hours – five minutes faster than he had run before to beat Boston Marathon champion Lelisa Desisa and Chicago Marathon runner-up Feyisa Lilesa. The prize winnings of US$200,000 represented a significant change of fortunes for the athlete and he remarked "I really don’t know what I will do with it". He made it three consecutive wins at the distance by topping the podium at the Orlen Warsaw Marathon in 2:07:57 hours later that season.

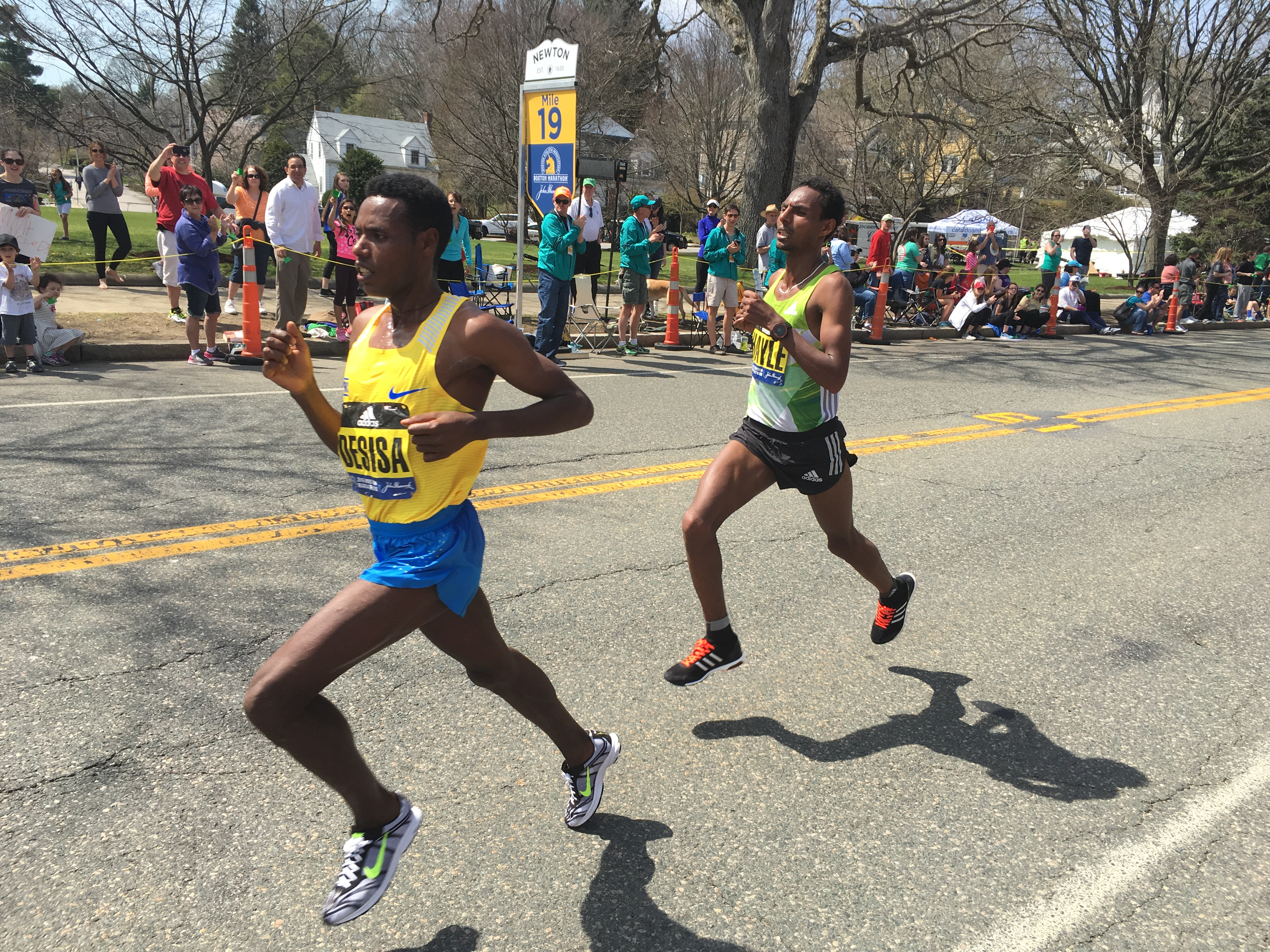
Lemi Berhanu Hayle trails Lelisa Desisa as they pass mile 19 during the 2016 Boston Marathon, but Hayle went on to win; Desisa came in second.

After losing his winning streak on his international debut at the 2015 World Championships in Athletics, he returned to defend his Dubai title in 2016 and gave a strong effort with a personal best of 2:04:33 hours. However, he lost out in a sprint finish with Tesfaye Abera and finished in second place, nine seconds in arrears. Lemi won the 2016 Boston Marathon in a time of 2:12:45, confirming his place among the world's top distance runners.

In 2026 Lemi won the Amsterdam Marathon in wet conditions. He ran a new personal record of 2:03:33.

== International competitions ==
Year	Competition	Venue	Position	Event	Notes
2014	Zürich Marathon	Zürich, Switzerland	1st	Marathon	2:10:40
2015	Dubai Marathon	Dubai, United Arab Emirates	1st	Marathon	2:05:28
2015	Orlen Warsaw Marathon	Warsaw, Poland	1st	Marathon	2:07:57
2015	World Championships	Beijing, China	15th	Marathon	2:17:37
2016	Dubai Marathon	Dubai, United Arab Emirates	2nd	Marathon	2:04:33
2016	Boston Marathon	Boston, United States	1st	Marathon	2:12:45
2016	Olympic Games	Rio de Janeiro, Brazil	13th	Marathon	2:13:29
2017	Xiamen International Marathon	Xiamen, China	1st	Marathon	2:08:27
2017	New York City Marathon	New York City, United States	4th	Marathon	2:11:52
2018	Hengshui Lake Marathon	Hengshui, China	1st	Marathon	2:08:51
2019	Toronto Waterfront Marathon	Toronto, Canada	2nd	Marathon	2:05:09
2021	Boston Marathon	Boston, United States	2nd	Marathon	2:10:37
2022	Boston Marathon	Boston, United States	11th	Marathon	2:09:43
2023	Mumbai Marathon	Mumbai, India	1st	Marathon	2:07:32
2024	Mumbai Marathon	Mumbai, India	1st	Marathon	2:07:50
2024	Prague Marathon	Prague, Czech Republic	1st	Marathon	2:08:44
2024	Beijing Marathon	Beijing, China	1st	Marathon	2:09:16
2025	Prague Marathon	Prague, Czech Republic	1st	Marathon	2:05:14
2025	Beijing Marathon	Beijing, China	1st	Marathon	2:08:10
2026	Amsterdam Marathon	Amsterdam, Netherlands	1st	Marathon	2:03:33

== Circuit wins ==
- Zürich Marathon: 2014
- Dubai Marathon: 2015
- Orlen Warsaw Marathon: 2015
- Boston Marathon: 2016
- Xiamen International Marathon: 2017
- Hengshui Lake Marathon: 2018
- Mumbai Marathon : 2023
- Mumbai Marathon : 2024
- Prague Marathon : 2024
- Prague Marathon : 2025
