= Naom Jebet =

Kenyan long-distance runner and marathon winner

Personal information
- Nationality: Kenyan
- Born: 5 April 1994 (age 32)

Sport
- Sport: Athletics
- Events: Long-distance running, Marathon

Naom Jebet (born 5 April 1994) is a Kenyan long-distance runner specializing in road running events, including the marathon and half marathon. She has won multiple international marathons throughout her career.

== Career ==
Naom Jebet began to make her mark in international road races in the late 2010s. In 2019, she achieved her personal best in the half marathon at the Copenhagen Half Marathon, clocking 1:08:08. She also finished eighth at the Ras Al Khaimah Half Marathon that year with a time of 1:08:19, a strong performance in a highly competitive race.

Jebet secured her first significant marathon victories in 2020 and 2021. She won the Wizz Air Sofia Marathon in 2020 with a time of 2:28:38, followed by a second-place finish at the Maratón BP Castellón in 2:27:56. In 2021, she claimed first place at both the Marathon Varna (2:33:08) and Marathon Stara Zagora (2:32:04).

In 2023, Jebet achieved a notable victory at the Nairobi City Marathon, winning with a personal best time of 2:23:33, which also set a course record. She also finished eighth at the Frankfurt Marathon that year, recording 2:26:48.

Jebet continued her winning streak in 2024, securing victory at the Zurich Rock 'n' Roll Running Series Madrid Marathon with a time of 2:26:20. Later in the year, she also won the Porto Marathon with a time of 2:30:00.

== Personal bests ==
- Marathon – 2:23:33 (Nairobi, 2 July 2023)
- Half Marathon – 1:08:08 (Copenhagen, 15 September 2019)
- 10 Kilometres Road – 31:49 (15 April 2017)
