= Kirsi Rauta =

Finnish long-distance runner

Kirsi Irene Rauta (born 17 March 1962 in Kouvola) is a retired female marathon runner from Finland. She represented her native country at the 1996 Summer Olympics in Atlanta, United States, where she didn't finish in the women's marathon race. She set her personal best (2:28:00) on 2 April 1995 at the London Marathon. She finished in second place in the 1991 Chicago Marathon.

== Achievements ==
Year	Competition	Venue	Position	Event	Notes
Representing Finland
1994	European Championships	Helsinki, Finland	7th	Marathon	2:33.32
1995	World Championships	Gothenburg, Sweden	13th	Marathon	2:35:39
