= Seville Marathon =

Annual marathon in Seville, Spain

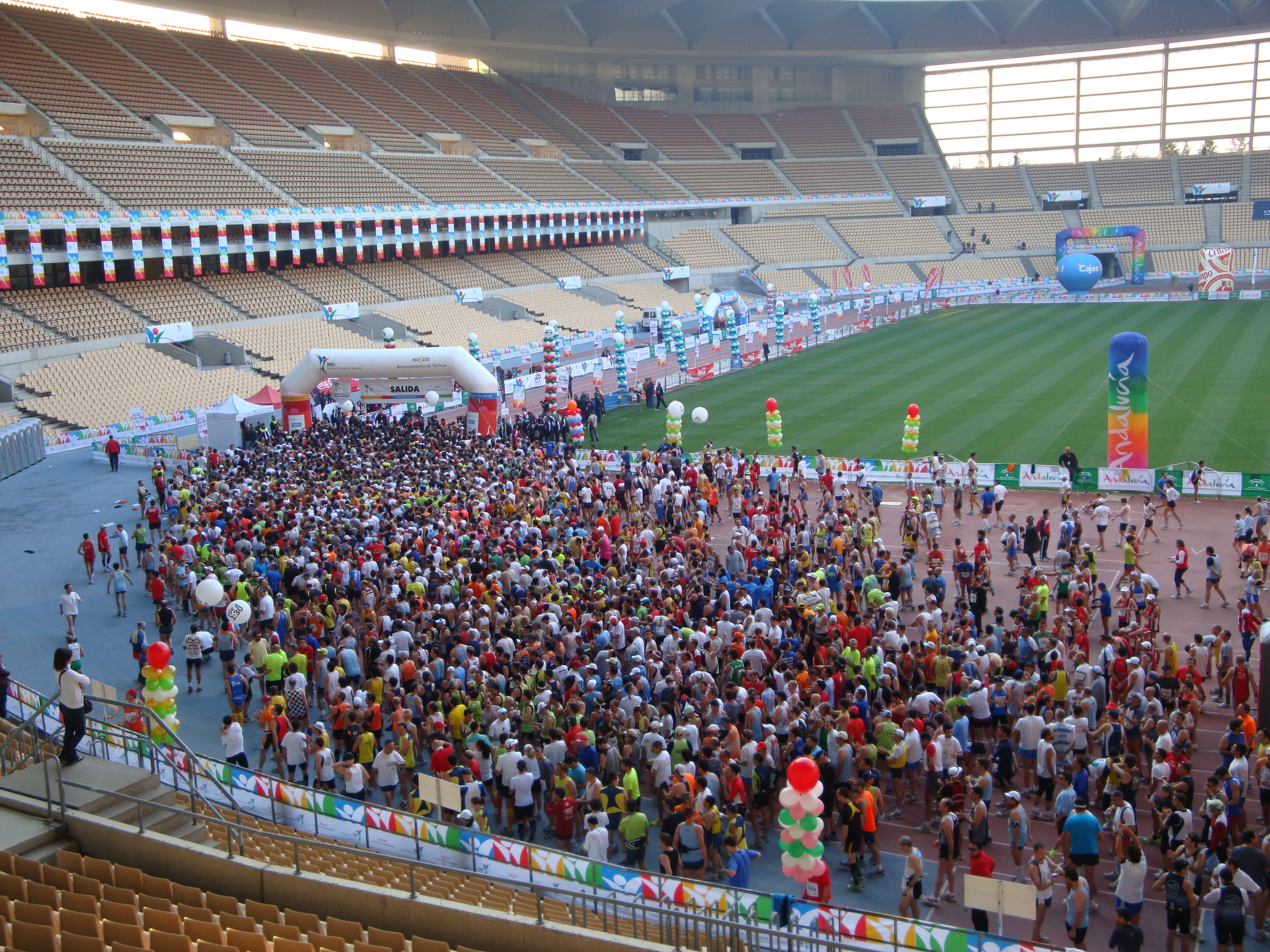
- Date: February
- Location: Seville, Spain
- Event type: Road
- Distance: Marathon
- Primary sponsor: Zurich
- Established: 1985 (41 years ago)
- Course records: Men: 2:03:27 (Ethiopia) Deresa Geleta (2024); Women: 2:18:51 (Ethiopia) Alemu Megertu (2022)
- Website: Official website
- Participants: 8292 finishers (2023); 10,316 (2020); 9154 (2019)

The Zurich Seville Marathon is a marathon held annually in the streets of Seville, Spain since 1985. It is organized by the department of sports of the town hall and sponsored by both public and private organizations. It was used as a host of the 1999 World Championships in Athletics marathon event. In 2018 was for the first time selected as a Gold Label Road Race by IAAF.

The women's course record (2:18:51) was set by Ethiopian Alemu Megertu in 2022, men's (2:03:27) was set also by Ethiopian, Deresa Geleta, in 2024.

== Winners ==
Key: Course record

Year	Men's winner	Time (h:m:s)	Women's winner	Time (h:m:s)
2025	Selemon Barega (ETH)	2:05:15	Anchinalu Dessie (ETH)	2:22:17
2024	Deresa Geleta (ETH)	2:03:27	Azmera Gebru (ETH)	2:22:13
2023	Gadisa Shumie (ETH)	2:04:59	Jackline Chelal (ETH)	2:20:29
2022	Asrar Abderehman (ETH)	2:04:43	Alemu Megertu (ETH)	2:18:51
2020	Mekuant Ayenew (ETH)	2:04:46	Juliet Chekwel (UGA)	2:23:13
2019	Tsedat Ayana (ETH)	2:06:36	Guteni Shone (ETH)	2:24:29
2018	Dickson Tuwei (KEN)	2:08:18	Kaoutar Boulaid (MAR)	2:25:32
2017	Titus Ekiru (KEN)	2:07:42	Paula González (ESP)	2:28:54
2016	Cosmas Lagat (KEN)	2:08:14	Paula González (ESP)	2:31:18
2015	Lawrence Cherono (KEN)	2:09:39	Filomena Costa (POR)	2:28:00
2014	Cosmas Lagat (KEN)	2:08:33	Pamela Rotich (KEN)	2:35:43
2013	Solomon Busendich (KEN)	2:10:13	Ehite Bizuayehu (ETH)	2:29:52
2012	Mohamed Bilal (MAR)	2:13:41	Jill Hodgins (IRL)	2:46:40
2011	Daniel Abera (ETH)	2:09:53	Alemnesh Eshetu (ETH)	2:33:26
2010	Philipp Biwott (KEN)	2:10:39	Desta Girma (ETH)	2:34:53
2009	Hailu Dogaga (ETH)	2:10:31	Marisa Barros (POR)	2:26:03
2008	Samson Bungei (KEN)	2:10:52	Ana Dias (POR)	2:29:22
2007	Sylvester Chebii (KEN)	2:15:16	Faustina-María Ramos (ESP)	2:45:34
2006	Christopher Kipkoech (KEN)	2:19:12	Faustina-María Ramos (ESP)	2:40:20
2005	Noah Serem (KEN)	2:22:15	Liliya Yadzhak (RUS)	2:45:18
2004	Nelson Lebo (KEN)	2:11:13	Julia Myatt (GBR)	2:46:48
2003	Onesmus Mutisya (KEN)	2:17:24	Beatriz Ros (ESP)	2:31:09
2002	William Musyoki (KEN)	2:16:22	Faustina-María Ramos (ESP)	2:36:13
2001	José Rey (ESP)	2:10:49	Faustina-María Ramos (ESP)	2:34:41
2000	Alexandr Krestyaninov (RUS)	2:16:52	Irina Suvorova (RUS)	2:33:48
1999	John Mutai (KEN)	2:16:35	Marie Söderström-Lundberg (SWE)	2:35:21
1998	Nicolas Kioko (KEN)	2:13:01	Anfisa Kosacheva (RUS)	2:41:25
1997	Agustín Molina (ESP)	2:17:43	Anfisa Kosacheva (RUS)	2:41:18
1996	Jorge Juan Sempere (ESP)	2:16:35	María Luisa Muñoz (ESP)	2:28:59
1995	Diego García (ESP)	2:11:21	Alzira Lário (POR)	2:47:04
1994	José Apalanza (ESP)	2:16:09	Ana Isabel Alonso (ESP)	2:33:18
1993	Vicente Antón (ESP)	2:14:37	Karen MacLeod (GBR)	2:34:30
1992	Miguel Ríos (ESP)	2:15:31	Christine Van Put (BEL)	2:40:46
1991	Laurenio Bezerra (BRA)	2:11:56	Sarah Davis (USA)	2:56:45
1990	Luis Adsuara (ESP)	2:15:01	Marina Prat (ESP)	2:38:14
1989	Suleiman Nyambui (TAN)	2:16:59	Consuelo Alonso (ESP)	2:51:33
1988	Pavel Klimeš (TCH)	2:12:59	Wendy Flath-Harris (USA)	3:03:07
1987	Vicente Antón (ESP)	2:12:56	María Luisa Irízar (ESP)	2:42:08
1986	Vicente Antón (ESP)	2:14:40	Carmen Mingorance (ESP)	2:57:38
1985	Francisco Medina (ESP)	2:21:23	Wendy Harris (USA)	3:12:09
