= Desta Girma Tadesse =

Ethiopian long-distance runner

Desta Girma Tadesse (born March 27, 1987) is a female long-distance runner from Ethiopia. Her personal best is 2:31:44 achieved at 2013 Mumbai Marathon. In 2013, she also reached her personal best in half marathon, finishing after 1:12:01 in Rome Marathon. Girma has won 2010 and 2011 Madrid Marathon as well as 2011 Riga Marathon.

== Achievements ==
Year	Competition	Venue	Position	Event	Notes
Representing Ethiopia
2010	Madrid Marathon	Madrid, Spain	1st	Marathon	2:34:39
2011	Madrid Marathon	Madrid, Spain	1st	Marathon	2:35:28
2011	Riga Marathon	Riga, Latvia	1st	Marathon	2:37:14
2013	Madrid Marathon	Madrid, Spain	2nd	Marathon	2:36:44
