= Joseildo da Silva =

Brazilian long-distance runner

Personal information
- Full name: Joseildo Rocha da Silva
- Nationality: Brazilian
- Born: 20 February 1965 (age 61)

Sport
- Sport: Long-distance running
- Event: Marathon

Achievements and titles
- Olympic finals: 1992
- Regional finals: 1991
Medal record
Marathon
Representing Brazil
South American Championships in Athletics
Gold medal – first place	1991 Manaus	Marathon
World Marathon Majors
Gold medal – first place	1991 Chicago	Marathon

Joseildo Rocha da Silva (born 20 February 1965) is a Brazilian long-distance runner. He won the 1991 Chicago Marathon, the marathon event at the 1991 South American Championships in Athletics, and the 1993 Los Angeles Marathon. Da Silva competed in the men's marathon at the 1992 Summer Olympics.

== Career ==
In 1991, da Silva won the marathon event at the 1991 South American Championships in Athletics. Later in the year, he won the 1991 Chicago Marathon. Da Silva took the lead around 7 miles (11 km) into the race, and despite being caught by Irishman Roy Dooney after 24 miles (39 km) of the race, da Silva quickly dropped Dooney, and won the race by six seconds. His winning time of 2:14:33 was the slowest winning time since 1981, due to the wind and cold weather, and da Silva said that the lack of competition in the race affected his ability to run quickly. The prize money for winning the Chicago Marathon was $7,500.

In 1992, da Silva finished second in the Los Angeles Marathon. During the race, he was caught up behind a media car, which prevented him from being able to chase eventual race winner John Treacy. Later in the year, he finished fifth at the Boston Marathon, in a time of 2:11:53. Da Silva competed in the marathon event at the 1992 Summer Olympics in Barcelona, Spain. He finished 56th in a time of 2:26:00.

In 1993, da Silva won the Los Angeles Marathon in a time of 2:14:29. Da Silva sprinted away from the field with 2 miles (3.2 km) left of the race, and his winning time of 2:14:29 was the slowest ever winning time at the race. The race was run in temperatures of 88 °F (31 °C), which accounted for the slow race pace. Da Silva received $2,500 and a Mercedes-Benz car worth $35,000 as a prize for winning the race. Da Silva later came 16th at the 1994 Chicago Marathon, and did not finish the 1996 Chicago Marathon.

== Post career ==
After retiring, not much is known about da Silva, as he did not have a telephone in his house. According to a former agent, da Silva was involved in two road traffic accidents in the early 2000s.
