= Bute Gemechu =

Ethiopian long-distance runner

Personal information
- Nationality: Ethiopian
- Born: December 11, 2001 (age 23)

Sport
- Sport: Athletics
- Event(s): Long-distance running (Marathon, Half Marathon)

Bute Gemechu (born 11 December 2001) is an Ethiopian long-distance runner specializing in road racing, particularly the half marathon and marathon. He won the Dubai Marathon in a world-leading time on his debut.

== Career ==
His early international appearances included an eighth-place finish at the Istanbul Half Marathon in 2021, where he clocked 1:02:53.

In April 2024, Gemechu set a personal best in the half marathon, achieving a time of 1:00:03. Two months later, in June 2024, he secured a victory at the Guizhou Zhenning Huangguoshu Half Marathon, finishing in 1:01:22.

On 12 January 2025, in his marathon debut, Gemechu won the Dubai Marathon with a then-world-leading time of 2:04:51. During the race, he made a decisive move, breaking away from the lead pack after 35 kilometers to become the fifth consecutive Ethiopian debutant to win the men's race in Dubai.

== Personal bests ==
As of May 2025, Gemechu's personal bests are:

- Half Marathon – 1:00:03 (2024)
- Marathon – 2:04:51 (Dubai, 2025)
