= 2016 Boston Marathon =

Footrace in Boston, Massachusetts, USA

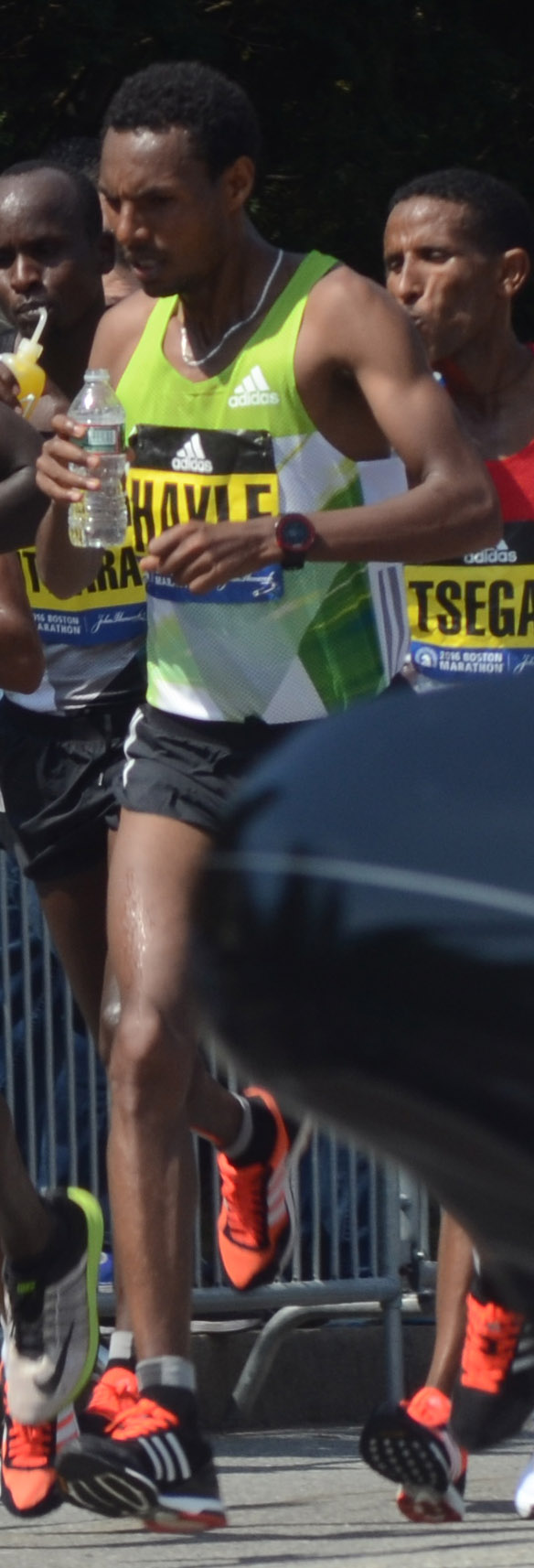
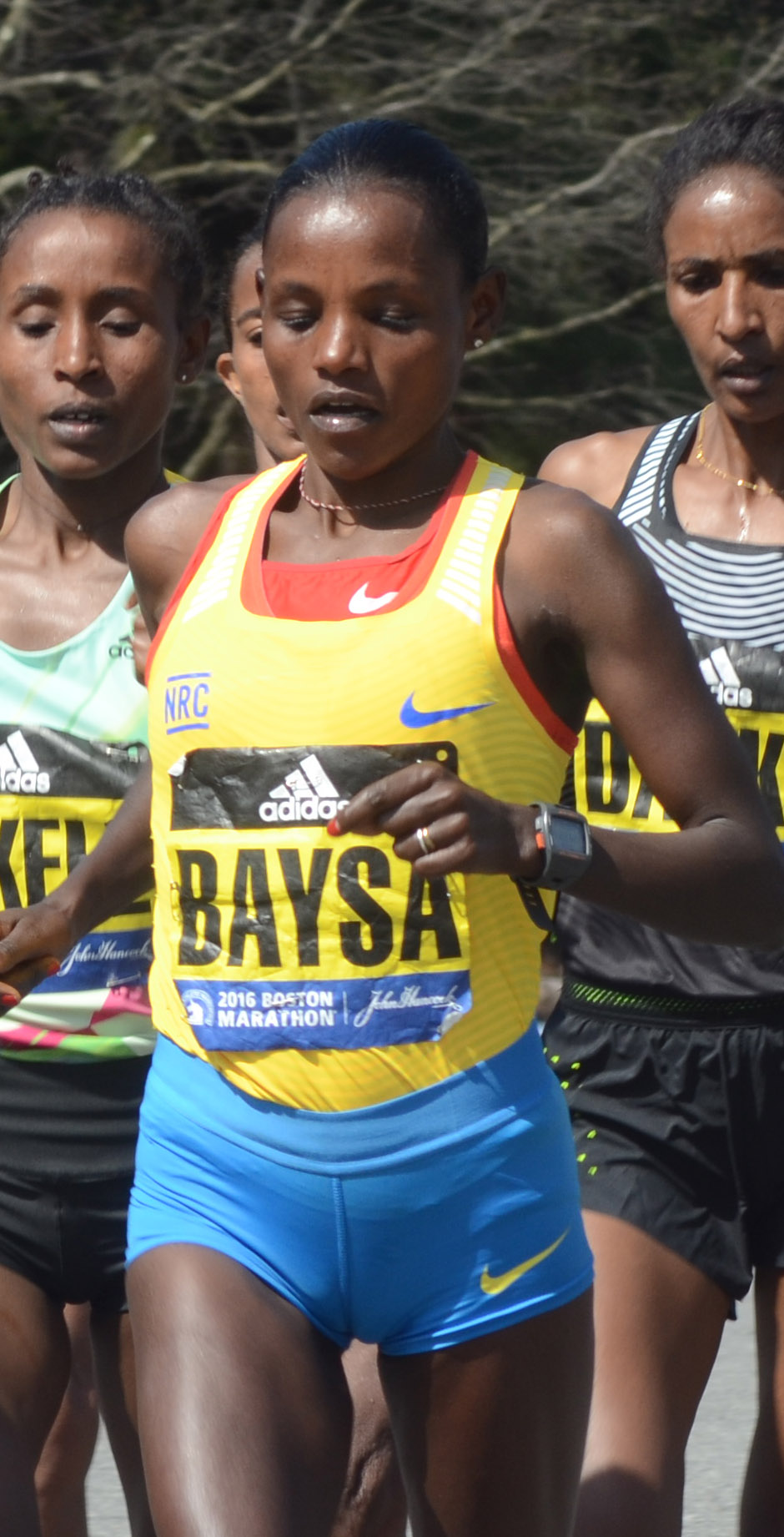
- Winners Lemi Berhanu Hayle and Atsede Baysa approaching the halfway point
- Venue: Boston
- Dates: April 18

Champions
- Men: Lemi Berhanu Hayle (2:12:45)
- Women: Atsede Baysa (2:29:19)
- Wheelchair men: Marcel Hug (1:24:06)
- Wheelchair women: Tatyana McFadden (1:42:16)

The 2016 Boston Marathon was the 120th running of the Boston Athletic Association's mass-participation marathon. It took place on Monday, April 18 (Patriots' Day in Massachusetts). Both of the winners were from Ethiopia: the men's race was won by Lemi Berhanu Hayle in a time of 2:12:45. Atsede Baysa won the women's race with a time of 2:29:19.

== Course ==
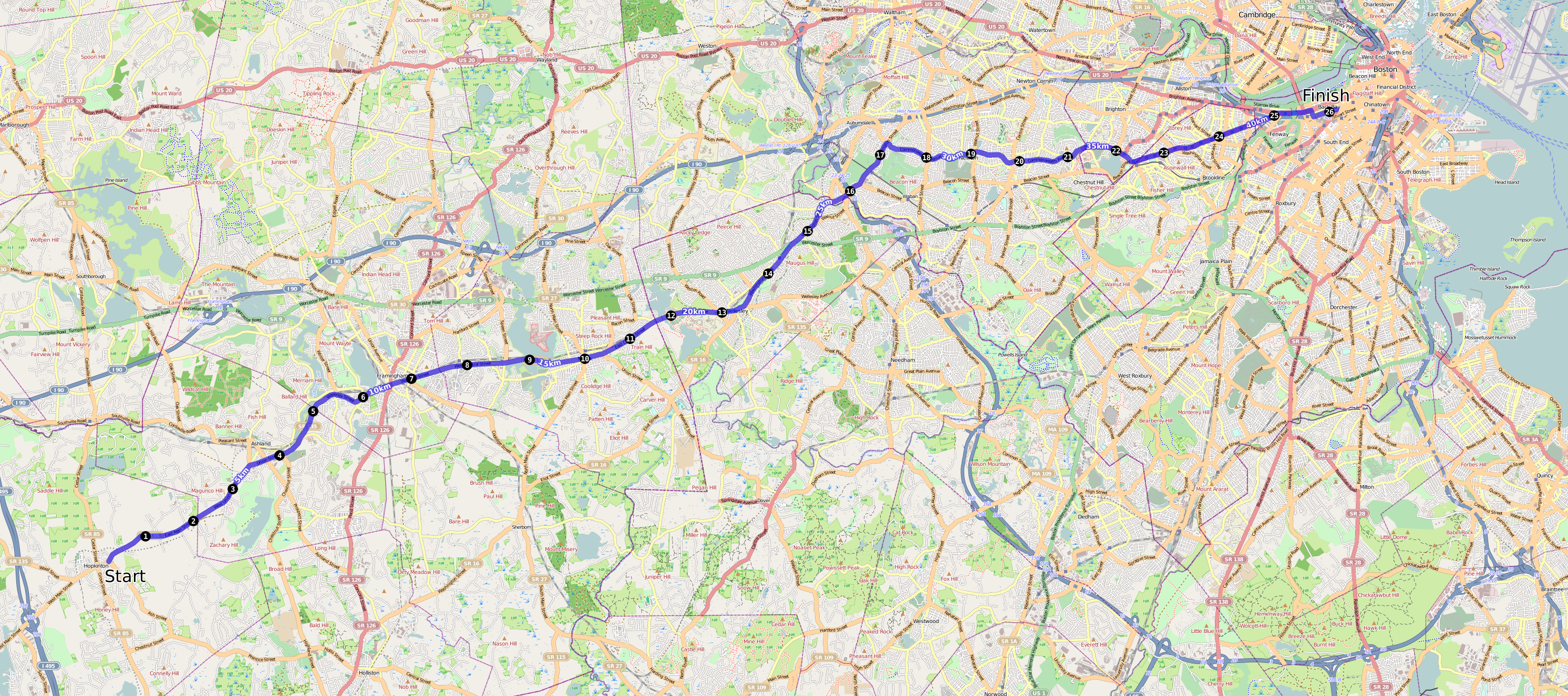
Course map

The event ran along the same winding course the Marathon has followed for many decades ‍—‌26 miles 385 yards (42.195 km) of roads and city streets, starting in Hopkinton and passing through six Massachusetts cities and towns, to the finish line beside the Boston Public Library, on Boylston Street in Boston's Copley Square.

Over 30,000 valid entries were submitted, with an approximate total of 27,500 runners starting the race. All 50 US states were represented at the marathon, as well as several U.S territories, including Guam, Puerto Rico, and the U.S. Virgin Islands.

The race was broadcast live on WBZ-TV in Boston and on NBC Sports in the rest of the United States.

== Race summary ==
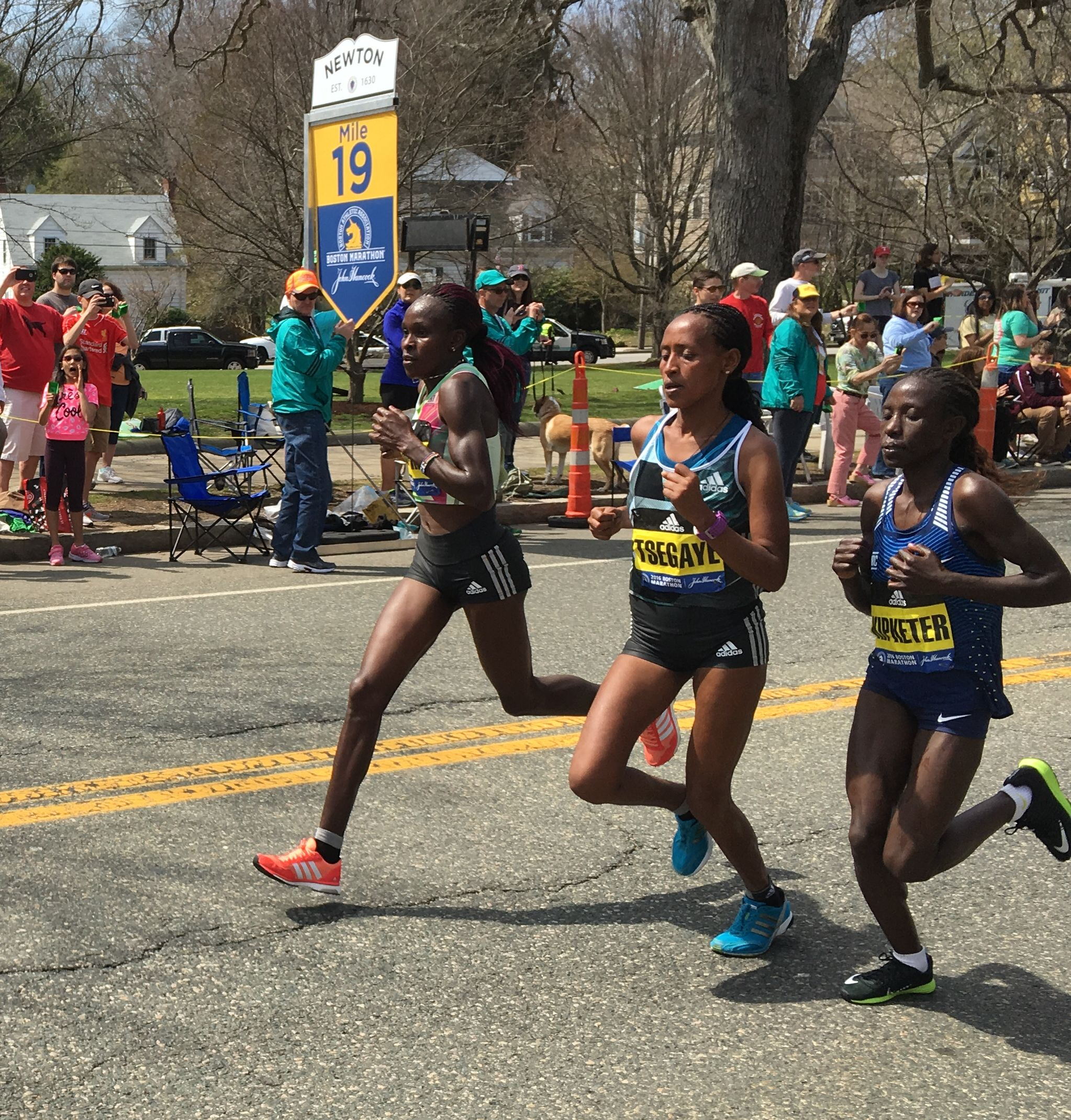
Joyce Chepkirui, Tirfi Tsegaye and Valentine Kipketer lead the women at mile 19

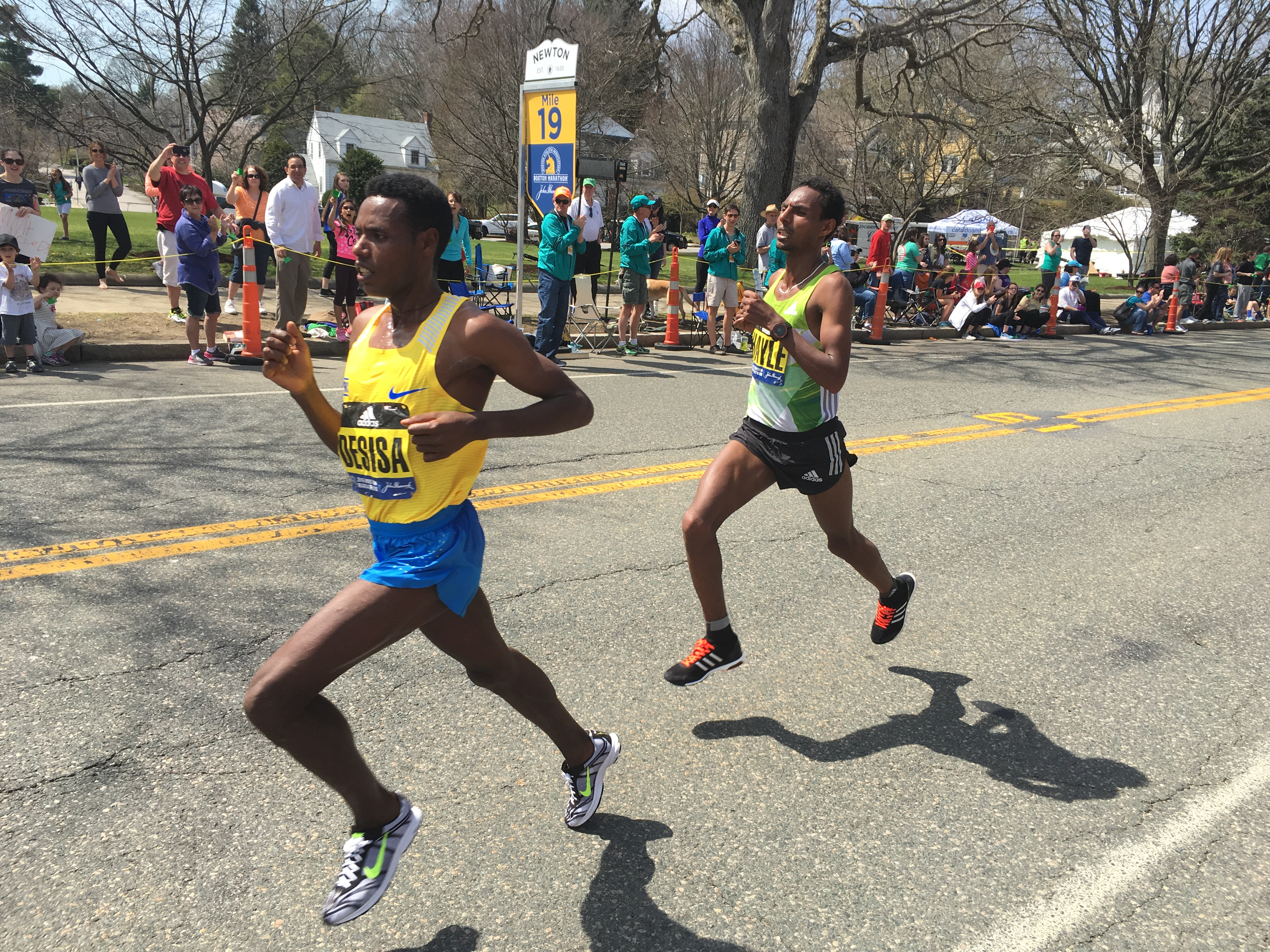
Second place Lelisa Desisa leads eventual winner Lemi Berhanu Hayle at mile 19

Race day was sunny and warm, with temperatures around 70 F (21 C) and a little wind. Security was extensive, with police from several towns and national guard patrolling along the course.

=== Women ===
Defending women's champion Caroline Rotich entered but did not complete the race, withdrawing after 5.0 miles (8.0 km). Three runners, Joyce Chepkirui, Tirfi Tsegaye and Valentine Kipketer led at 19.0 miles (30.6 km). Eventual winner, Atsede Baysa, well behind (by 37 seconds) even at 22.0 miles (35.4 km), passed second and third-place finishers Tsegaye and Chepkirui with two miles to go.

=== Men ===
Lelisa Desisa, who won Boston in 2013 and 2015, and 21-year-old Lemi Berhanu Hayle led the men's field for most of the race. Hayle pulled ahead of Desisa off the Massachusetts Turnpike into Kenmore Square at 25 miles (40 km), maintaining his lead to take the finish line. Yemane Tsegay came in third, completing a podium sweep for Ethiopia.

=== Wheelchair ===
In the wheelchair races, Marcel Hug won his second Boston Marathon in a three-way finish with ten-time winner Ernst van Dyk and Kurt Fearnley. Tatyana McFadden won her fourth successive title, a full minute ahead of Manuela Schär and 2015 runner-up Wakako Tsuchida.

== Results ==
Official results from the Boston Athletic Association:

Elite Men
Place	Athlete	Nationality	Time
1	Lemi Berhanu Hayle	Ethiopia	2:12:45
2	Lelisa Desisa	Ethiopia	2:13:32
3	Yemane Tsegay	Ethiopia	2:14:02
4	Wesley Korir	Kenya	2:14:05
5	Paul Lonyangata	Kenya	2:15:45
6	Sammy Kitwara	Kenya	2:16:43
7	Stephen Chebogut	Kenya	2:16:52
8	Abdi Nageeye	Netherlands	2:18:05
9	Getu Feleke	Ethiopia	2:18:46
10	Zachary Hine	United States	2:21:37

Elite Women
Place	Athlete	Nationality	Time
1	Atsede Baysa	Ethiopia	2:29:19
2	Tirfi Tsegaye	Ethiopia	2:30:03
3	Joyce Chepkirui	Kenya	2:30:50
4	Jeļena Prokopčuka	Latvia	2:32:28
5	Valentine Kipketer	Kenya	2:33:13
6	Flomena Cheyech Daniel	Kenya	2:33:40
7	Bizunesh Deba	Ethiopia	2:33:56
8	Fate Tola	Ethiopia	2:34:38
9	Neely Spence Gracey	United States	2:35:00
10	Mamitu Daska	Ethiopia	2:37:31

=== Wheelchair ===
Men
Place	Athlete	Nationality	Time
1	Marcel Hug	Switzerland	1:24:06
2	Ernst van Dyk	South Africa	1:24:06
3	Kurt Fearnley	Australia	1:24:06
4	David Weir	United Kingdom	1:26:17
5	James Senbeta	United States	1:26:19

Women
Place	Athlete	Nationality	Time
1	Tatyana McFadden	United States	1:42:16
2	Manuela Schär	Switzerland	1:43:30
3	Wakako Tsuchida	Japan	1:43:34
4	Susannah Scaroni	United States	1:46:53
5	Amanda McGrory	United States	1:49:31
