= Ursula Noctor =

Irish long-distance runner

- Noctor in 1992

Personal information
- Born: 21 January 1965 Republic of Ireland
- Died: 4 April 1993 (aged 28)

Sport
- Sport: Athletics
Medal record
Half Marathon
Irish Half Marathon Championships
| Gold medal – first place | 1992 | Marathon |

Ursula Noctor (21 January 1965 – 4 April 1993) was an Irish long-distance runner, who was Irish national champion in the half marathon in 1992. She finished fourth at the 1991 and 1992 Chicago Marathons.

== Career ==
Ursula Noctor was the course record holder for the Waterside Marathon. In 1982, she won the inaugural Cork Mini-Marathon. In 1987, Ursula came third at the 3,000 metres event at the Northern Irish Championships, competing as an athlete from the Republic of Ireland. In 1988, she won the 10,000 metres event at the Orlando Classic invitational meet. Ursula Noctor came third at the 1990 Columbus Marathon in a time of 2:39:26, winning $7,500.

Ursula Noctor finished fourth at the 1991 Chicago Marathon. In 1992, Ursula Noctor won the Republic of Ireland's National Half Marathon Championship. Later in the year, she finished fourth at the 1992 Chicago Marathon in a time of 2:41:52. It was her first marathon event since having surgery the year before.

== Illness and death ==
In 1991, Ursula Noctor was diagnosed with melanoma, and she had to have some lymph glands removed. At the time, she was given a 10 per cent chance of survival. Ursula died on 4 April 1993 of complications caused by the melanoma. She was aged 28.
