= Jose Cesar de Souza =

Brazilian marathon runner (born 1962)

Jose Cesar de Souza (born 16 November 1962) is a retired Brazilian marathon runner who competed in the 1980s and 1990s. In the World Marathon Majors, de Souza became the second athlete from Brazil to win the Chicago Marathon when he won the 1992 event in 2:16:14. The following year, de Souza reappeared at Chicago and finished in 12th place. Outside of Chicago, de Souza was 81st in the 1991 World Marathon Cup and failed to reach the finals of the 1998 IAAF World Road Relay Championships. He also won a silver medal at the 1987 South American Championships in Athletics.

== Biography ==
On 16 November 1962, de Souza was born in Goiana, Brazil. As a runner, de Souza competed in the 10 kilometres and marathon. His first competition was at the 1987 South American Championships in Athletics, where he won a silver medal in the marathon. At the Madrid Marathon, de Souza won consecutive events from 1989 to 1990.

In his first World Marathon Majors, de Souza was 52nd at the 1990 Boston Marathon and 81st at the 1991 London Marathon. After withdrawing from the 1992 Madrid Marathon due to a knee injury, de Souza returned to running at the 1992 Chicago Marathon. At Chicago, de Souza won the event in 2:16:14. With his 1992 win, de Souza was the second ever Brazilian to win the Chicago Marathon after Joseildo Rocha won the event in 2001. The following year, De Souza was in the top nine during the Chicago Marathon before finishing the event in 12th place.

In IAAF events, de Souza competed at the 1991 World Marathon Cup and was 81st in the men's event. He also was 5th in the trials for the 1998 IAAF World Road Relay Championships but did not make the finals. At a separate event outside of the Ibero-American Championships in Athletics, de Souza was 6th at the 1997 Ibero American Marathon Championships. In 1998, de Souza ended his running career when he was simultaneously completing his post-secondary education and working as a real estate broker. In 2002, de Souza planned to enter the 2003 Chicago Marathon after he turned forty years old. At the 2003 Chicago event in the 40-44 age group, de Souza did not compete in the race.
