= Roy Dooney =

Irish runner

Personal information
- Born: 28 January 1958 (age 68)

Sport
- Sport: Long-distance running
- Event: Marathon

Achievements and titles
- Personal best: 2:13:25
Medal record
Marathon
Representing Ireland
World Marathon Majors
Silver medal – second place	1991 Chicago	Marathon

Roy Dooney (born 23 January 1958) is an Irish former runner, who came second at the 1991 Chicago Marathon. He won the 1992 Grandma's Marathon, and was a member of the Irish team that won the 1988 New York City road relay race.

== Career ==
Dooney competed in nine World Cross Country Championships in the 1980s and 1990s. In 1988, Dooney was part of the Irish team that won a 50 kilometres (31 mi) relay road race event in New York City. Dooney was the only member of the four-man Irish team who was not living in the US at the time. He ran the third leg of the race, and completed his 7.4 miles (11.9 km) in a time of 36:41, a similar pace to Soviet runner Oleg Strizhakov who was in the lead with Dooney at the time. In 1989, Dooney came third at the Pittsburgh Marathon; after 5 kilometres (3.1 mi) of the race, Dooney had been leading by one second.

Dooney came second at the 1991 Chicago Marathon, behind Brazilian Joseildo da Silva. Dooney had been one of the favourites to win the race. Da Silva led for the whole race, and Dooney broke away from the chasing pack after 22 miles (35 km), and caught da Silva after 24 miles (39 km). Dooney was soon dropped by da Silva, and finished in a time of 2:14:39, one second slower than his personal best time, and six seconds behind da Silva. Dooney also competed at the 1992 Chicago Marathon; once again Dooney was a favourite for the race, and he finished sixth in the race. In the same year, he won the Grandma's Marathon in a time of 2:13:25, after breaking away from American Chad Bennion within the last 2 miles (3.2 km) of the race. Dooney never ran faster than 2:13:25. Dooney failed to qualify for the 1992 Summer Olympics, as he didn't reach the Irish qualifying time of 2:14:00 in the two qualification events.

Dooney worked as a promoter for the 2002 IAAF World Cross Country Championships which were held in Dublin, Ireland.

== Personal life ==
Dooney is from Dublin, Ireland. Roy Dooney's sons Conor and Kevin are both Irish cross country runners. In 2014, Roy and Conor Dooney became the 13th father and son pair to have both competed for Ireland at the European Cross Country Championships.
