= Anchinalu Dessie =

Ethiopian long-distance runner

Personal information
- Nationality: Ethiopian
- Born: 9 January 2003 (age 23) Ethiopia
- Occupation: Long-distance runner
- Years active: 2022–present

Sport
- Sport: Athletics
- Event(s): Marathon, Half marathon

Achievements and titles
- Personal bests: 10 km road: 31:01 (Valencia 2022); Half marathon: 1:07:30 (Lille 2023); Marathon: 2:18:31 (Dubai 2026)
Medal record
Athletics
Representing Ethiopia
World Athletics Label Road Races
Gold medal – first place	2025 Seville	Marathon
Gold medal – first place	2025 Beijing	Marathon
Gold medal – first place	2026 Dubai	Marathon

Anchinalu Dessie (born 9 January 2003) is an Ethiopian long-distance runner who specializes in the marathon. She is known for her exceptional consistency, having won all three of her first international marathon appearances, including a world-leading victory at the 2026 Dubai Marathon.

== Career ==
Anchinalu Dessie began her international career on the road circuit in 2022, recording a 10 km personal best of 31:01 in Valencia. In March 2023, she demonstrated her potential at longer distances by finishing third at the Lille Half Marathon in 1:07:30.

She made a successful marathon debut in early 2025, winning the Seville Marathon in 2:22:17. She followed this success in November 2025 by claiming victory at the Beijing Marathon in 2:26:08, establishing herself as a rising star in the discipline.

On 1 February 2026, she competed as a late entry in the 25th anniversary edition of the Dubai Marathon. In a highly competitive race, she remained part of a leading trio alongside Muliye Dekebo and Fantu Worku until the final stages. At approximately the 41 km mark, Dessie capitalized on a brief struggle by Dekebo at the final drink station to pull away. She won the race in a personal best time of 2:18:31, shaving nearly four minutes off her previous best and setting a world-leading time for the 2026 season.

== Achievements ==
Year	Race	Place	Position	Time
2023	Lille Half Marathon	Lille	3rd (Half marathon)	1:07:30
2025	Seville Marathon	Seville	1st (Marathon)	2:22:17
2025	Beijing Marathon	Beijing	1st (Marathon)	2:26:08
2026	Dubai Marathon	Dubai	1st (Marathon)	2:18:31
