= Daniel Rono =

Kenyan long-distance runner

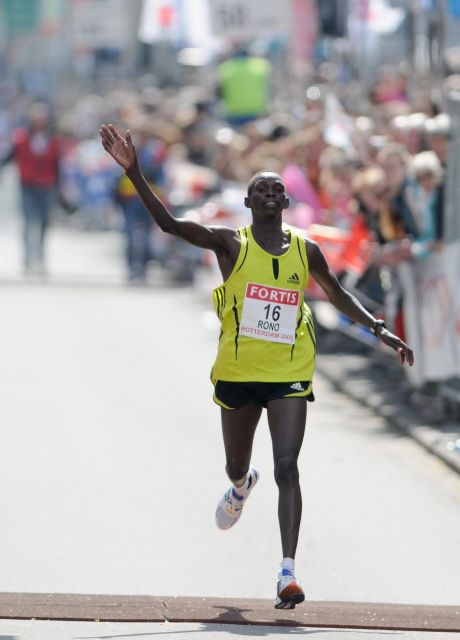
Rono finishing second at the 2008 Rotterdam Marathon

Daniel Rono (born 13 July 1978) is a Kenyan long-distance runner who competes in marathon races. He began his marathon career in 2005 and has won marathons in Mumbai, Toronto and Madrid.

Rono has also reached the podium at major races including the 2007 Paris Marathon, 2008 Rotterdam Marathon, the 2008 New York City Marathon and the 2009 Boston Marathon. He ran his personal best time of 2:06:58 hours in 2008. He has also competed in half marathons and has a best of 1:00:14 hours in that event.

== Career ==
Born in Kenya's Keiyo District, Daniel Rono established himself with a win at the Groningen Half Marathon in a fast time of 60:14 minutes in 2002. The following year he was fifth at the Stramilano Half Marathon. In 2004 he won the Giro Podistico di Rovereto and had top five placings at the Memorial Peppe Greco 10K and the Berlin Half Marathon.

After a fourth-place finish at the Prague Half Marathon in April 2005, he made his debut over the full marathon distance. His first outing at the Madrid Marathon also brought him his first victory in the event and his winning time of 2:12:29 hours was a course record. The switch to the longer distance proved to be a success as he won the 2006 Mumbai Marathon in a course record then had a third straight win at the Toronto Waterfront Marathon, where he set a personal best time of 2:10:14 hours.

Rono reached the podium at the 2007 Paris Marathon, coming third. He attempted to defend his title in Toronto and a duel against John Kelai saw both runners go under the previous Canadian all-comers record, but it was Rono who finished as runner-up with his first sub-2:10 run of 2:09:36 hours. His next competition, the 2008 Rotterdam Marathon saw him deliver a lifetime best performance as the runner-up behind William Kipsang with a time of 2:06:58 hours. Rono made his first appearance at a World Marathon Major event that November as he entered the New York City Marathon and claimed third place on the podium behind Marilson Gomes Dos Santos and Abderrahim Goumri. He returned to the American circuit for the 2009 Boston Marathon. Although he initially thought he would struggle in the second half of the race with its steep inclines, he went on to finish as the runner-up behind Deriba Merga – an achievement which meant that he had never finished outside of the top three positions in the first five years of his marathon career.

He gained his first international selection at the 2009 World Championships in Athletics, but days before the competition he was forced to withdraw under doctor's orders due to an ankle injury sustained in training. Upon his return from injury, he saw his podium streak come to an end at the Rotterdam Marathon, where he came seventh in a very fast race which saw the top four runners all go under two hours and six minutes. Rono rebounded at the Toronto Waterfront Marathon that October when he came third in a time of 2:08:15 hours (the second fastest of his career).

He came sixth at the Ljubljana Marathon in October 2011 in a time of 2:10:11 hours, a result that represented one of his worst marathon career performances at the mid-level race. He was back under that time at the 2012 Marrakesh Marathon, taking third in 2:09:50 hours, but he slowed in the final stages of the Ottawa Marathon and fell back to fifth place in two hours and twelve minutes. He was runner-up at the Turin Marathon in November.

He missed the early year road racing season in 2013 but made a return to top form at October's Beijing Marathon by coming third in a personal best of 2:07:20 hours – his best time since 2008.
