= 1991 Chicago Marathon =

Footrace held in Chicago, Illinois

14th Chicago Marathon
- Venue: Chicago, United States
- Dates: October 27

Champions
- Men: Joseildo da Silva (2:14:33)
- Women: Midde Hamrin (2:36:21)

The 1991 Chicago Marathon was the 14th running of the annual marathon race in Chicago, United States and was held on October 27. The elite men's race was won by Brazil's Joseildo da Silva in a time of 2:14:33 hours and the women's race was won by Sweden's Midde Hamrin in 2:36:21.

== Background ==
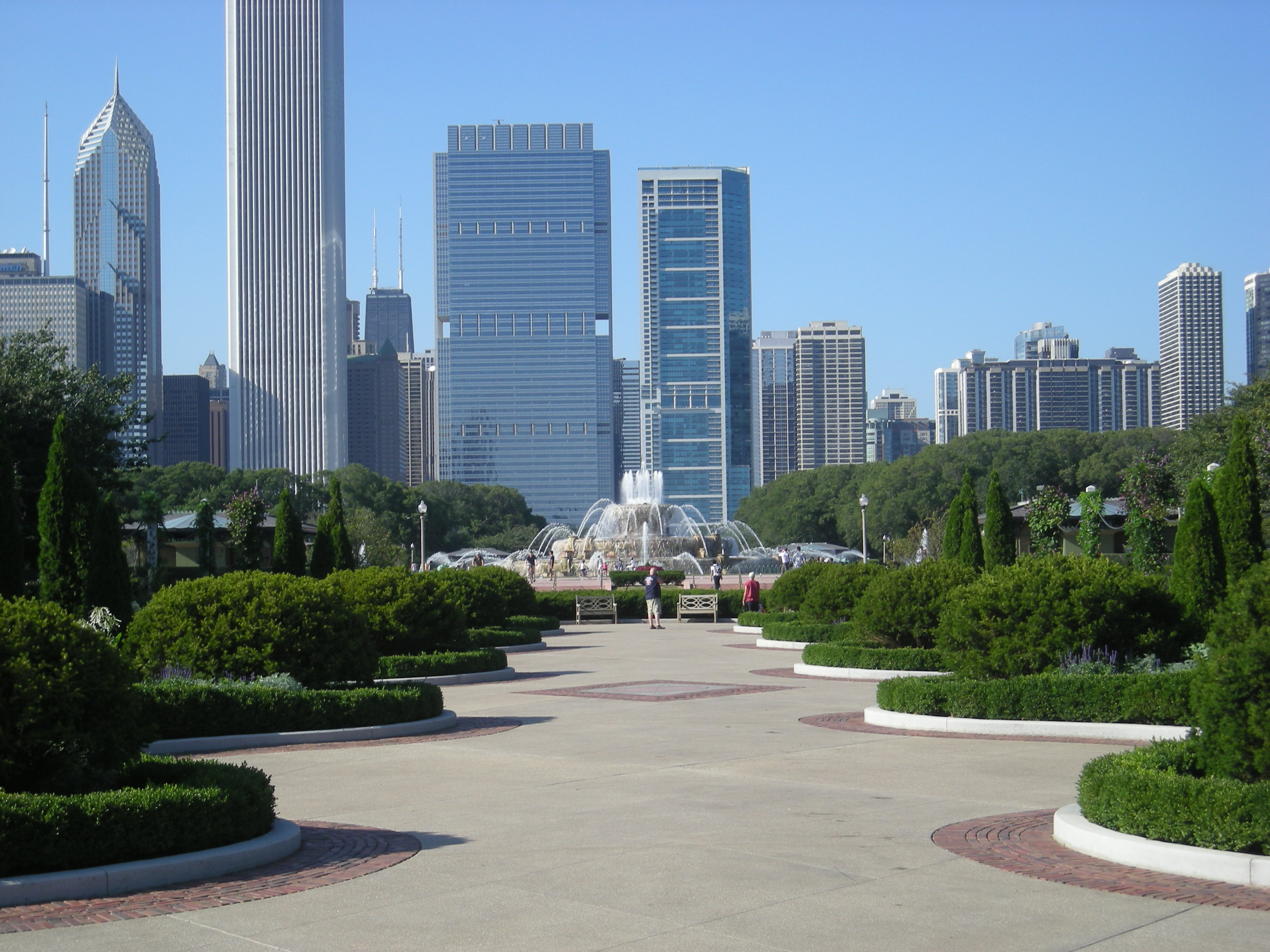
The finish line of the 1991 Chicago Marathon was in Grant Park

The 1991 Chicago Marathon was run without a title sponsor. The 1990 race had been sponsored by G. Heileman Brewing Company, but the race organizers decided they wanted the race to be known as the Chicago Marathon. As a result, the prize money was reduced from $30,000 in 1990 to $7,500 in 1991, plus two free airline tickets. The lack of prize money affected the quality of athletes that participated in the event, with the Chicago Tribune saying that the 1991 race had the weakest field since 1981.

In the men's race, Richard Kaitany who came third at the 1990 Chicago Marathon and won the 1991 Houston Marathon was considered one of the favorites. Other favorites for the men's race included Irish athlete Roy Dooney, Polish national champion Mirosław Bugaj, and Mexican 5,000 and 10,000 meters national champion Marcos Baretto.

The course for the 1991 race was similar to the 1990 race, with a few minor alterations to the roads used. The race began at the Daley Plaza, and the second half of the race was run on the southbound carriageway of Lake Shore Drive. The finish line was in Grant Park. The flatness of the course meant that world record attempts were thought possible.

== Race summary ==
The races temperature was measured as 51 °F (11 °C), and the course was windy, particularly between 12–22 miles (19–35 km), where the racers followed Lake Shore Drive.

The men's race was won by Brazilian Joseildo da Silva. Polish athlete Leszek Stokłosa was the race's pacemaker, and da Silva took the lead around 7 miles (11 km) into the race with fellow Brazilian José Santana. Santana later dropped back, and a chasing group formed, containing Santana, Roy Dooney, and Dave Mora.After 22 miles (35 km), Dooney broke away from the chasing group, and he caught up to da Silva after 24 miles (39 km) of the race. Da Silva quickly dropped Dooney again. Da Silva won the race by six seconds from Dooney, and da Silva's winning time of 2:14:33 was the slowest winning time since 1981. After the race, da Silva said that the wind and a lack of competition in the race affected his ability to run quickly.

The women's race was won by Swede Midde Hamrin in a time of 2:36:21. Harmin broke away from the pack after 5 miles (8.0 km) and stayed ahead throughout. Kirsi Rauta, who finished second, was over two minutes behind Hamrin. Hamrin's winning time was also the slowest since 1981.

The mass participation race had around 7,500 starters and 5,908 finishers. The oldest competitor in the race was 75.

== Results ==
=== Men ===
Men's top 10 finishers
Position	Athlete	Nationality	Time
1	Joseildo da Silva	Brazil	2:14:33
2	Roy Dooney	Ireland	2:14:39
3	Jose Santana	Brazil	2:15:06
4	David Mora	United States	2:15:44
5	Valmir de Carvalho	Brazil	2:16:22
6	Kim Chul-un	South Korea	2:17:00
7	Thomas O'Gara	Ireland	2:18:27
8	David O'Keefe	United States	2:18:30
9	Tommy Ekblom	Finland	2:19:13
10	Greg Meyer	United States	2:19:27

=== Women ===
Women's top 10 finishers
Position	Athlete	Nationality	Time
1	Midde Hamrin	Sweden	2:36:21
2	Kirsi Rauta	Finland	2:38:21
3	Silvana Pereira	Brazil	2:40:10
4	Ursula Noctor	Ireland	2:41:21
5	Kirsi Valasti	Finland	2:41:45
6	Monica Signahl	Sweden	2:42:36
7	Patricia Griffin	Ireland	2:42:45
8	Mary Pastillo	United States	2:43:45
9	Carina Leutner	Austria	2:46:12
10	Betsy Frick	United States	2:50:26
