= 1981 Chicago Marathon =

Footrace held in Chicago, Illinois

5th Chicago Marathon
- Venue: Chicago, United States
- Dates: September 27

Champions
- Men: Phil Coppess (2:16:13)
- Women: Tina Gandy (2:49:39)

The 1981 Chicago Marathon was the fifth running of the annual marathon race in Chicago, United States and was held on September 27. The elite men's and women's races were won by Americans Phil Coppess (2:16:13 hours) and Tina Gandy (2:49:39). A total of 4252 runners finished the race, an increase of over 600 from the previous year.

== Results ==
=== Men ===
| Position | Athlete | Nationality | Time |
|---|---|---|---|
| 1st place, gold medalist(s) | Phil Coppess | United States | 2:16:13 |
| 2nd place, silver medalist(s) | Tony Shockency | United States | 2:17:15 |
| 3rd place, bronze medalist(s) | Frank Shorter | United States | 2:17:27.7 |
| 4 | Robert Busby | United States | 2:17:44 |
| 5 | David Hinz | United States | 2:18:03 |
| 6 | Kevin Higdon | United States | 2:19:37 |
| 7 | Joseph Sheeran | United States | 2:20:15 |
| 8 | Garry Bjorklund | United States | 2:20:26 |
| 9 | Gerald Krane | United States | 2:22:22 |
| 10 | John Wellerding | United States | 2:23:35 |

=== Women ===
| Position | Athlete | Nationality | Time |
|---|---|---|---|
| 1st place, gold medalist(s) | Tina Gandy | United States | 2:49:39 |
| 2nd place, silver medalist(s) | Charlene Groet | United States | 2:56:33 |
| 3rd place, bronze medalist(s) | Betty Johnny | United States | 2:58:05 |
| 4 | Betty Hite | United States | 2:58:58 |
| 5 | Sue Petersen | United States | 2:59:16 |
| 6 | Karen Bukowski | United States | 3:04:47 |
| 7 | Moo Thorpe | United States | 3:05:40 |
| 8 | Jayne Schiff | United States | 3:06:43 |
| 9 | Patricia Elmer | United States | 3:06:46 |
| 10 | Peggy McAleer | United States | 3:08:38 |
