= Tina Gandy =

American marathoner

Personal information
- Born: June 23, 1953 (age 72) Sioux City, Iowa
- Height: 5 ft 5 in (165 cm)
- Weight: 106 lb (48 kg)

Sport
- Sport: Marathon
- Retired: 1984

Tina Gandy Kingery (born 23 June 1953) is a former American marathoner. Gandy was a daycare teacher before she decided to start racing in January 1977. During her athletic career, Gandy won the 1981 Chicago Marathon and was seventh at the 1982 Chicago Marathon. Gandy's final race was at the 1984 United States Olympic Trials before she ended her career due to prior injuries. After leaving running in 1984, Gandy went to Boulder, Colorado to work in healthcare.

== Early life and education ==
Gandy was born on 23 June 1953 in Sioux City, Iowa. For her post-secondary education, she played in sports at Drake University.

== Career ==
While working as a daycare teacher, Gandy was encouraged by her friend to try out marathon racing as a way of exercise. At the start of her marathon career in January 1977, Gandy ran in events held by the Amateur Athletic Union and won her first race in March 1977. From 1977 to 1980, Gandy primarily ran in races throughout the Midwestern United States which included the Bobby Crim Special Olympics, L'eggs Mini-Marathon and the Nike OTC Marathon. Her first World Marathon Majors appearance was at the 1981 Chicago Marathon, which she won with a time of 2:49:39. The following year, Gandy was seventh at the 1982 Chicago Marathon. Gandy continued to run until her final event at the 1984 United States Olympic Trials where she placed in 89th position. After ending her athletic career that year due to marriage and prior injuries, Gandy moved to Boulder, Colorado to work in healthcare.

== Personal life ==
Gandy does not have any children and was previously married.
