= Valentine Kipketer =

Kenyan long-distance runner

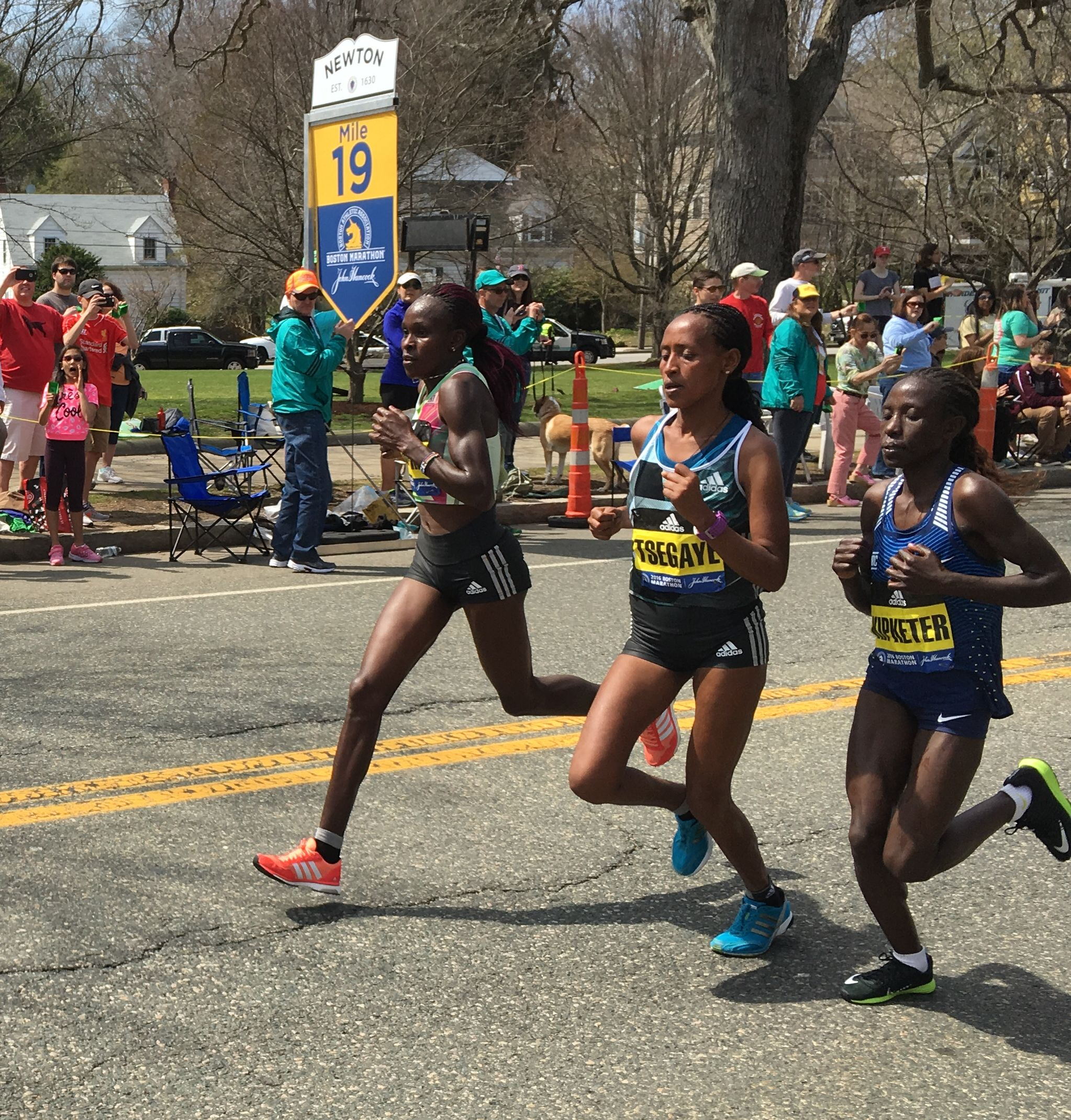
Valentine Kipketer (right) at mile 19 during the 2016 Boston Marathon

Valentine Jepkorir Kipketer (born 5 January 1993) is a Kenyan long-distance runner who specialises in the half marathon and marathon distances. She has won marathons in Mumbai and Amsterdam and represented her country at the 2013 World Championships in Athletics. She has personal bests of 2:23:02 hours for the marathon and 1:08:21 hours for the half marathon.

Kipketer first emerged in cross country running competitions: after a fifth place at the 2008 Eurocross at the age of fifteen, in 2009 she came third at the Discovery Cross Country Championships in Eldoret and was the North Rift Valley junior champion. Her international career began in 2010 in the Netherlands: she ran a 5000 metres best of 16:22.83 minutes at the FBK Games, came third at the 4 Mijl van Groningen and was in the top ten at the Zevenheuvelenloop.

Her breakthrough came the following year with her transition into road running events. She won the major Berlin Half Marathon race in 70:12 minutes. A runner-up finish at the Zwolle Half Marathon preceded another prominent victory at the Lille Half Marathon, where her winning time of 68:21 minutes (ranking her eleventh in the world that year). She dipped under seventy minutes again at the New Delhi Half Marathon, but this was only enough for seventh in a very competitive field. She opened 2012 with a win at the Lotto Cross Cup de Hannut. Her only other outing that year was a debut over the marathon distance – she was leading at the halfway point but faded in the second half, ending fifth with a time of 2:28:02 hours.

Kipketer won her first marathon race at the beginning of 2013, taking the title at the Mumbai Marathon in a personal best of 2:24:33 hours. Although she was only fourth at the Berlin Half Marathon, she was selected for the 2013 World Championships in Athletics. She faltered on her international debut, dropping out of the World Championship marathon. The Amsterdam Marathon saw a revival in her fortunes as she won the major race with a new best time of 2:23:02 hours, although she expressed disappointment at not having run faster.
