= Mumbai Marathon =

Annual international marathon held in Mumbai, India

- The logo for Mumbai Marathon
- Date: Third Sunday of January
- Location: Mumbai, Maharashtra, India
- Event type: Road running
- Distance: Marathon, Half marathon, 10K run
- Primary sponsor: Tata
- Established: 2004
- Course records: Men: 2:07:32 (2023) (Ethiopia) Lemi Hayle; Women: 2:24:15 (2023) (Ethiopia) Anchialem Haymanot
- Website: Mumbai Marathon

The Mumbai Marathon (known as the Tata Mumbai Marathon for sponsorship reasons by Tata Group), is an annual international marathon held in Mumbai, India, on the third Sunday of January every year. It is the largest marathon in Asia as well as the largest mass participation sporting event on the continent. It is the richest race in India with a prize pool of US$405,000. The IAAF elevated the race to an IAAF Gold Label Road Race in 2010.

The Mumbai Marathon has six different race categories: Marathon (42.195 km), Half Marathon (21.097 km), Dream Run (6 km), Senior Citizens' Run (4.3 km), Champions with Disability (2.4 km), and an Open 10K.

The course records set in 2013 were the fastest times ever run for a marathon in India in the women's marathon category – 2:24:33 by the women's winner Valentine Kipketer, Kenya. In 2020, Derara Hurisa broke the men's marathon record, completing the race in 2:08:09. In 2023, 2 new course records were set. For the men's, Hayle Lemi set a new record of 2:07:32 as the marathon's winner. For the women's, Anchialem Haymanot set a new record of 2:24:15 as the marathon's winner.

The event helped bridge the gap between Indian elite athletes and the international elite. Indian runner Ram Singh Yadav qualified for the 2012 Summer Olympics with his best marathon time of 2:16:59 at the 2012 edition.

It was not held for two years in 2021 and 2022 during the COVID-19 pandemic. The following edition was held on 15 January 2023.

== History ==
Inspired by the London Marathon, Procam International believed that Mumbai would support such a road race. The first event was held in 2004, titled as the Standard Chartered Mumbai International Marathon. Standard Chartered Bank continued as the event's title sponsor for 14 years up until 2017. In 2018, the Tata Group and Tata Consultancy Services replaced Standard Chartered as the Marathon sponsor for a period of 10 years.

In 2005, Mumbai Marathon was included as one of the legs of "The Greatest Race on Earth", sponsored by Standard Chartered. The other three legs of this four-marathon race were the Singapore Marathon, the Nairobi Marathon and the Hong Kong Marathon, which were all sponsored by the Bank as well.

The race became an IAAF Silver Label Road Race in 2009. The IAAF elevated the race to an IAAF Gold Label Road Race in 2010, which was taken away in 2013 remaining unlabelled until 2018 when the Silver Label was awarded. The 2019 edition was classified as a Gold Label again.

=== Inspiration Medal ===
The inspiration medal is an award that started in 2018, when Tata Group took control of the event. The initiative was to increase participation and encourage marathoners to complete the marathon run (42 km).The medal has two sides, and it reads the finisher on one side and the inspiration on the other. Hence, it helps to share the joy of winning with their inspiration.

== Organization ==
Mumbai Marathon is the property of Procam International Pvt. Ltd., a Mumbai-based sports management company. Procam International also owns other road races in India such as the Vedanta Delhi Half Marathon, Tata Consultancy Services World 10K Bangalore, and Tata Steel World 25K Kolkata.

== The Race ==
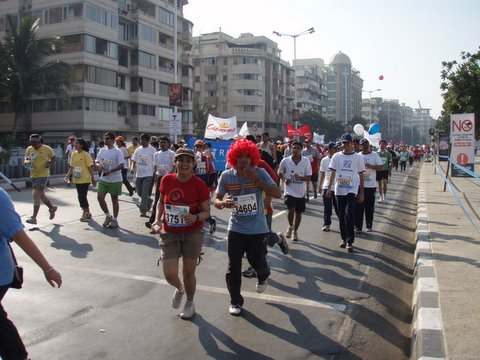
Runners at the 2008 Mumbai Marathon.

The six categories cater to different participants. They are the Marathon (42.195 km), Half Marathon (21.097 km), Dream Run (6 km), Senior Citizens Event (4.3 km), and Champions with Disability Event (2.4 km). The Open 10K has been introduced from the 2018 edition of the Mumbai Marathon.

The marathon starts opposite Chhatrapati Shivaji Terminus Mumbai. It passes many of the city's iconic locations such as Flora Fountain, Marine Drive, Chowpatty, Haji Ali, Mahim Church, and the Bandra–Worli Sea Link. The London marathon winner and the secretary of the Association of International Marathons and Distance Races, Hugh Jones, is the race director.

== Winners ==
Key: Course record

Edition	Year	Men's winner	Time (h:m:s)	Women's winner	Time (h:m:s)
1st	2004	Hendrick Ramaala (RSA)	2:15:47	Wioletta Uryga (POL)	2:47:53
2nd	2005	Julius Sugut (KEN)	2:13:20	Mulu Seboka (ETH)	2:35:03
3rd	2006	Daniel Rono (KEN)	2:12:03	Mulu Seboka (ETH)	2:33:15
4th	2007	John Kelai (KEN)	2:12:27	Yang Fengxia (CHN)	2:36:16
5th	2008	John Kelai (KEN)	2:12:23	Mulu Seboka (ETH)	2:30:04
6th	2009	Kenneth Mugara (KEN)	2:11:51	Kebebush Haile (ETH)	2:34:08
7th	2010	Denis Ndiso (KEN)	2:12:40	Bizunesh Urgesa (ETH)	2:31:09
8th	2011	Girma Assefa (ETH)	2:09:54	Koren Jelela (ETH)	2:26:56
9th	2012	Laban Moiben (KEN)	2:10:48	Netsanet Achamo (ETH)	2:26:12
10th	2013	Jackson Kiprop (UGA)	2:09:32	Valentine Kipketer (KEN)	2:24:33
11th	2014	Evans Rutto (KEN)	2:09:33	Dinknesh Mekash (ETH)	2:28:08
12th	2015	Tesfaye Abera (ETH)	2:09:46	Dinknesh Mekash (ETH)	2:30:00
13th	2016	Gideon Kipketer (KEN)	2:08:35	Shuko Genemo (ETH)	2:27:50
14th	2017	Alphonce Simbu (TAN)	2:09:32	Bornes Kitur (KEN)	2:29:02
15th	2018	Solomon Deksisa (ETH)	2:09:34	Amane Gobena (ETH)	2:25:49
16th	2019	Cosmas Lagat (KEN)	2:09:15	Worknesh Alemu (ETH)	2:25:45
17th	2020	Derara Hurisa (ETH)	2:08:09	Amane Beriso (ETH)	2:24:51
–	2021	Not held due to COVID-19 pandemic			
–	2022	Not held due to COVID-19 pandemic			
18th	2023	Lemi Hayle (ETH)	2:07:32	Anchialem Haymanot (ETH)	2:24:15
19th	2024	Lemi Hayle (ETH)	2:07:50	Abersh Minsewo (ETH)	2:26:06
20th	2025	Berhane Tesfay (ERI)	2:11:44	Joyce Chepkemoi (KEN)	2:24:56
21st	2026	Tadu Abate Deme (ETH)	2:09:55	Yeshi Kalayu Chekole (ETH)	2:25:13

=== Multiple wins ===
Men's
Athlete	Wins	Years
John Kelai (KEN)	2	2007, 2008
Lemi Hayle (ETH)	2	2023, 2024

Women's
Athlete	Wins	Years
Mulu Seboka (ETH)	3	2005, 2006, 2008
Dinknesh Mekash (ETH)	2	2014, 2015

=== By country ===
Country	Men's	Women's	Total
Ethiopia	7	16	22
Kenya	10	3	13
Poland	0	1	1
South Africa	1	0	1
China	0	1	1
Uganda	1	0	1
Tanzania	1	0	1
Eritrea	1	0	1

== Charity ==
The Mumbai Marathon is India's largest charity platform for non-profit organisations to raise funds. NGOs represent causes such as arts, culture and sports, civic and community development, disability, education, environment and wildlife, health, human rights, social services, vocational training, and women, children and the aged. Organizations register with the Event's official Philanthropy Partner, United Way Mumbai. Some NGOs used this event as a platform to raise awareness for their work, and some to directly raise funds. Fundraising is facilitated by an easy-to-use model designed for all groups to raise funds.

Over ₹1.9 billion (US$29 million) has been raised from year 2004 to year 2017.

The first race in 2004 had 22,000 participants and raised ₹14.4 million (US$269,000). Both the number of participants and amount of money raised rose drastically over the years with 30,000 people running in 2007 (₹79.4 million, US$1,490,000). The 2017 edition hosted 42,000 runners (₹329 million, US$5,087,761).

=== Dream Team ===
This special category is meant for highly motivated individuals who feel passionately about a cause and commit to raise a substantial sum of funds. Over the years, the Dream Team has seen a mix of business magnates, celebrities, socialites, NGO trustees, and students. Levels include:

- Dream Champion – minimum pledge of INR 1 million.
- Dream Wizard – minimum pledge of INR 500,000
- Dream Maker – minimum pledge of INR 100,000

=== Corporate Challenge ===
The Corporate Challenge is a category for companies who wish to sponsor employee teams to participate in event and raise funds. 166 companies fielded 257 Corporate Challenge teams at Mumbai Marathon 2013.

=== Philanthropy Partner ===
United Way Mumbai is Mumbai Marathon's Philanthropy Partner. UWM assumes the role of a "Philanthropy Exchange" for charities and non-profit organizations that register with the Event. The Philanthropy Partner's roles are to:

- Facilitate & supplement pledge raising efforts of individuals, companies and NGOs.
- Create, build and communicate the Charity Structure.
- Work on all aspects of Charity like registrations, race day logistics, communications and receiving donations.
- Accounting & reconciling of Pledges.
- Disbursement of funds to beneficiary NGOs.
- 80G receipts to all donors.

UWM maintains neutrality and ensures a level playing field among all participating NGOs. UWM also serves as an assurance to the donor that the NGO and the cause for which money is being donated are credible.

== Flame of Marathon ==
Mumbai Marathon was the youngest marathon to be awarded the "Flame of the Marathon". It was flown in from Greece by Maria Polyzou, Greek Marathon Champion and Director of the Museum of Marathon Runs. They were received by then Mayor of Mumbai Smt. Shraddha Jadhav, at Chhatrapati Shivaji International Airport. The flame was carried by sports luminaries, celebrities, sponsors/partners and dignitaries from the government in a flame relay to the Hutatma Chowk in Fountain, Mumbai. The participants of the torch relay were celebrities including Priya Dutt, Jaspal Bindra, Rahul Bose, John Abraham, Shobha De, Milind Soman, Dhanraj Pillay, and Kiran More.

== Trophy ==
To commemorate Mumbai Marathon's 10th edition, a rolling trophy was instituted, to be handed over to the men's and women's marathon champions.

The trophy was unveiled by Shri K. Sankaranarayanan, (then) Governor of Maharashtra.

The trophy was designed by artist and sculptor Shri Paresh Maity.

== Event Ambassadors ==
The international ambassadors for the Mumbai Marathon have been:

- 2004—Michael Johnson
- 2005—Paul Tergat, Steve Ovett
- 2006—Anju Bobby George, Linford Christie
- 2007—Kelly Holmes, Aravinda de Silva
- 2008—Gabriela Szabo
- 2009—Gail Devers
- 2010—Daniel O'Brien
- 2011—Cathy Freeman
- 2012—Vijay Amritraj
- 2013—Haile Gebrselassie
- 2014—Damon Hill
- 2015—Marion Bartoli
- 2016—Edwin Moses
- 2017—David Rudisha
- 2018—Sergey Bubka
- 2019—Mary Kom
- 2020—Shannon Miller
- 2023—Yohan Blake
- 2024—Meb Keflezighi
- 2025—Mo Farah
- 2026—Andre De Grasse

== Sponsors/partners ==
- Title sponsor: Tata
- Co Title sponsor: Tata Consultancy Services (TCS)
- Associate sponsor: IDFC FIRST Bank
- Sports Goods partner: Asics
- Hydration partner: Bisleri
- Electric two wheeler partner: VIDA
- Energy Drink partner: Fast&Up
- Social Connect partner: Vedanta
- Hospitality partner: Trident
- Print partner: The Times of India
- Radio partner: Radio Mirchi
- Telecast partner: Sony Sports
- Medical Partner: Asian Heart Institute
- Philanthropy partner: United Way Mumbai
- Institution Partner: Adhata
- CWD facilitator: Adapt
- Inclusion Ally: ABBF
- Promoted By : Procam
- Supported by: Government of Maharashtra, M.C.G.M, Indian Navy
- Under the aegis of: Athletics Federation of India
- Certified by: AIMS
