= United Way Mumbai =

Mumbai-based non-profit organisation

United Way Mumbai is a non-profit organisation. addressing social challenges across urban and rural India. As part of the global United Way network with operations in 36 countries, this Mumbai-based non-profit collaborates with corporations, non-government organisations (NGOs), government agencies, and individuals to implement solutions in health, education, financial security, and climate and community resiliency.

== History and network ==
United Way Mumbai established in 2002 is a member of the international United Way network, which has a 130+ year legacy of fostering community development. United Way Mumbai is one of the Indian chapters, as it is also joined by several other regional chapters in Delhi, Bengaluru, Chennai, Baroda, and Hyderabad – each focusing on localised issues within their respective communities.

== Geographical reach ==
The organisation has developed a national footprint through partnerships, and extended its initiatives to multiple states of India, including Assam, Uttar Pradesh, Bengaluru, Delhi, Gujarat, Karnataka, Tamil Nadu, Telangana, and West Bengal, among others.

By collaborating with local NGOs, corporate partners, and government agencies, United Way Mumbai's programmes drive social impact

== Role in the Mumbai Marathon ==
Since 2009, United Way Mumbai has served as the official philanthropy partner for India's largest sporting fundraising platform, the Mumbai Marathon (previously called the Standard Chartered Mumbai Marathon and now the Tata Mumbai Marathon due to sponsorship by the Tata Group). In this capacity, the organisation promotes philanthropy through sports enabling participating NGOs to leverage the fundraising potential of the event. To do this, the non-profit facilitates connections between runners, non-runners, corporate partners and participating charities, raising funds for an extensive list of social causes through its digital platform.

In 2009, the event raised approximately INR 7.75 crore, which increased to INR 45.95 crore by 2020. The 2024 edition, on the other hand, set a philanthropic record, with over INR 58 crores raised before race day. By April 2024, the total funds raised had reached INR 72.39 crore, benefiting 268 NGOs. The same year saw over 12,000 individuals run to promote diverse causes, supported by 1,157 fundraisers and 179 corporate partners. Additionally, 24,083 individual donors contributed to the fundraising efforts.

In the 20th edition of the Tata Mumbai Marathon in January 2025, United Way Mumbai, serving as the official philanthropy partner, helped raise approximately ₹43 crore (about US $5.2 million), with participation from 269 NGOs, corporations, and individuals.

In its 21st edition, the platform raised ₹60.68 crore through 13,580 fundraiser runners. The fundraising effort supported 309 NGOs, with contributions from 28,000 donors, affirming its status as India's largest philanthropic sporting platform. The event also saw participation from 275 corporate teams representing 194 companies, alongside over 69,000 runners across age groups. The edition also recorded its highest-ever participation of first-time fundraisers, with over 1,100 individuals taking up the cause.

Since its inception, the TMM has raised over INR 543 crore (about approximately US $57.10 million), benefiting more than 1,000 NGOs across various causes

== Major Initiatives ==
United Way Mumbai implements these initiatives:

Let’s READ:

The Let’s Read initiative is focussed towards enhancing literacy among children, particularly in underserved communities. The initiative includes the establishment of reading centres, storytelling sessions, and access to books, with a focus on promoting a love for reading and improving literacy skills. It also integrates digital literacy to help children navigate digital learning tools.

A key component of this initiative is the Let's READ Carnival, an annual event that promotes reading for leisure and cognitive development especially among children from low-income schools and regions.

United for Road Safety

United for Road Safety addresses road safety issues, particularly in high-risk areas, in collaboration with partners such as the Mumbai Traffic Police, Regional Transport Office, the National Service Scheme of the University of Mumbai and other road safety experts. The initiative focuses on educating youth in safe two-wheeler riding skills through 'Two Wheels One Life,' creating a network of Road Safety Clubs to spread awareness. It also trains first responders in 'JeevanDoot' (translates to first responders) to provide timely emergency care to road accident victims.

Other mass awareness campaigns like 'Slow Down & Respect the Stop Line' aim to sensitise road users and advocate for better safety practices. The initiative also introduces India’s first mobile two-wheeler simulator, forming a collective approach to road safety by addressing education, engineering, and emergency care. In addition, as part of the VIA initiative, United Way Mumbai also works with teachers, parents, and local traffic authorities to build a strong support system for child road safety.
