= Phil Coppess =

American long-distance runner

Phil Coppess (born September 2, 1954) is an American former long-distance runner. Coppess went to high school in Oxford Junction, Iowa where he was a standout runner. Coppess won the State Boys' Outdoor Track & Field 2-mile run in 1971; he won the State Cross Country in 1971; the State Cross Country Individual Mile in 1971; the State Boys' Indoor Track & Field 2-mile run in 1972; and the State Boys' Outdoor Track & Field 2-mile run in 1972.

In the mid-1980s, he was one of the best US marathon runners, although he worked full-time in a factory and was a single parent. In 1981 he won the Drake Relays Marathon, the Chicago Marathon and the Rocket City Marathon in Huntsville. He finished sixth in the 1982 London Marathon. In 1985 he won the Twin Cities Marathon with his personal best of 2:10:05, one of the faster times run by an American that year. The time set a course record that stood for 33 years until broken by Kenyan Dominic Ondoro.

In 1985, Coppess was named the "Road Runner of the Year" by the Road Runners Club of America.
