= Julia Martín =

Spanish singer, songwriter, and record producer (born 1987)

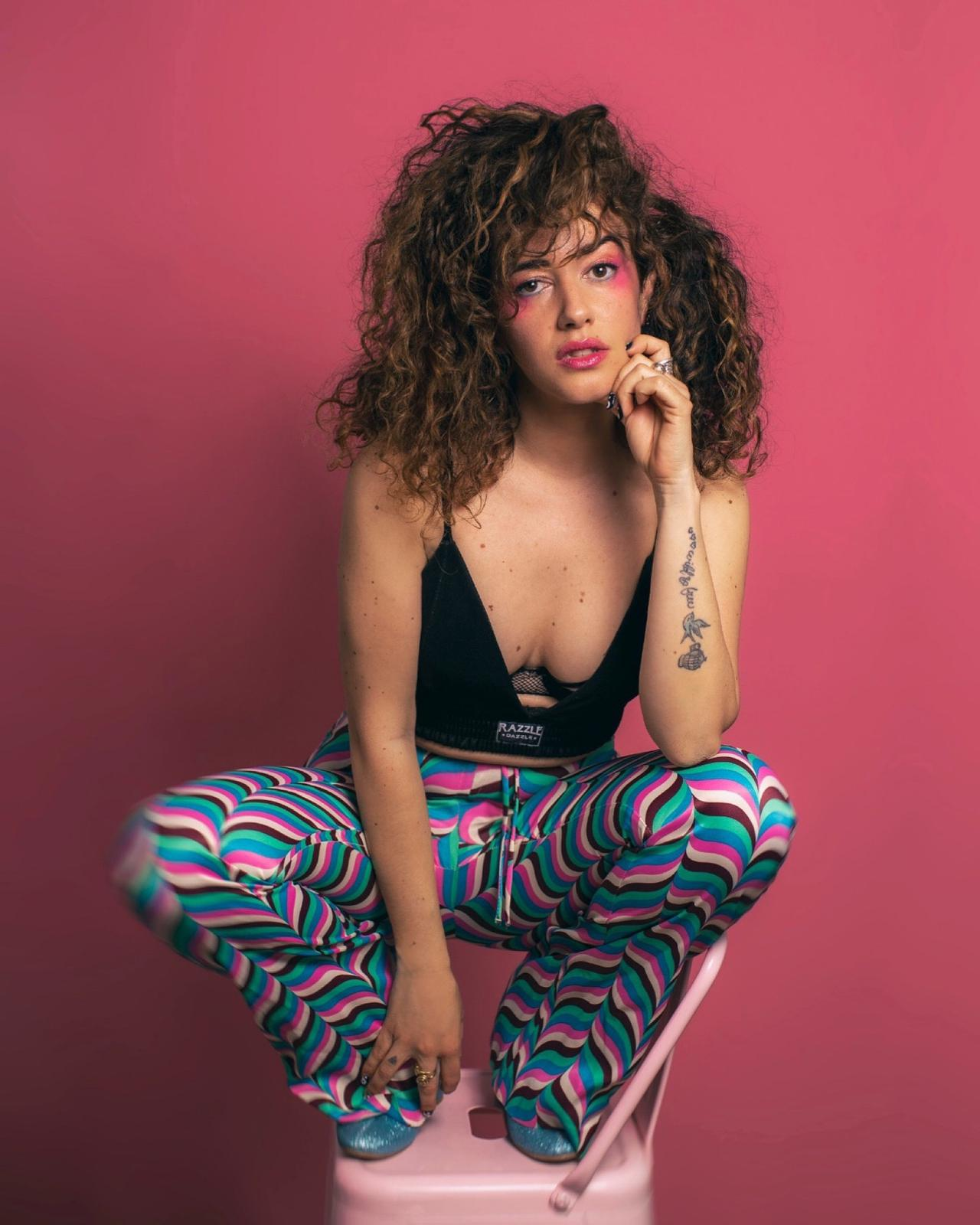

Background information
- Born: Julia Aguilar Martín; October 2, 1987 (age 38); Málaga, Spain
- Origin: Málaga, Spain
- Genres: Pop; R&B; Hip hop; Neo soul; Soul; Funk; Afrobeats; Afropop
- Occupations: Singer; songwriter; record producer
- Years active: 2017–present
- Website: juliamartinmusic.com

Julia Aguilar Martín (born 2 October 1987), known professionally as Julia Martín, is a Spanish singer, songwriter, and record producer from Málaga. She is known for her distinctive use of live looping techniques and her genre-blending musical style that incorporates elements of pop, R&B, neo soul, funk, and Afrobeats.

== Early life and education ==
She grew up in an artistic family; her father is Paco Aguilar, an artist and owner of the art workshop Gravura, and her grandfather Pedro Aguilar "Casero" was a flamenco singer, though not professionally.

As a child, Julia was influenced by Michael Jackson, particularly after listening to his album History. She began taking flamenco lessons from Sole, a cantaora friend of her parents, and initially performed the famous Tangos de La Repompa. Her musical education was further enriched by her father's eclectic taste, which included artists like Sade, Dire Straits, The Beatles, Michael Jackson, and Stevie Wonder.

Julia studied Musical Interpretation at the Superior School of Dramatic Art of Málaga, completing part of her studies in Rennes, France. After finishing her education, she initially worked at Málaga Airport selling tourist packages before moving to London, United Kingdom, where she lived for two years.

== Career ==
=== Early career and London period (2010s) ===
With only 300 euros, she moved to London, where she worked in a recording studio and met Des Marks, who introduced her to Jamaican music and the London underground music scene. It was during this period that she began her career as a songwriter and created some of the songs that would later appear on her first album.

=== Return to Spain and street performances ===
Upon returning to Málaga, Julia discovered the precarious reality of the Spanish music industry. She joined a band called Los Negroides and began performing on the streets, an experience she credits with teaching her valuable lessons about connecting with audiences. She has described street performing as "very honest and pure" and noted that it helped her overcome stage fright and develop her performance skills.

During this period, she developed a special interest in live looping, a technique that has become her distinctive signature. This technique allows her to record instrumental and vocal sounds live and create layered musical arrangements during performances.

=== S.U.P.E.R.R.E.A.L (2018) ===
Julia's debut album S.U.P.E.R.R.E.A.L was released in 2018. The album featured collaborations with Elphomega, Gordo Master, and Des Marks. The work showcased her eclectic musical style, incorporating elements of urban music, funk, electronic pop, and hip hop. Many of the songs on the album were composed during her time in London and represented eight years of musical development.

Following the album's release, Julia became established in the local music scene, participating in notable events and festivals including Festival Terral, Brisa Festival, Porton del Jazz, and the Noches del Gibralfaro cycle.

=== Recognition and collaborations ===
In 2021, Julia served as a member of the jury for the Ateneo-UMA Awards. That same year, she collaborated as a music producer for poet Ángelo Néstore on his EP Poeta Ciborg Pecador.

In 2023, Julia participated as a contestant in Cover Night, a program by Shine Iberia broadcast on RTVE. She also won the contest for the second edition of Fulanita Fest, which allowed her to perform at Madrid Pride and be confirmed as the opening act for Fulanita Fest 2024.

=== Yulai Bombay (2025) ===
Julia's second studio album Yulai Bombay was released on 11 April 2025. The album, which takes its name from one of her early artistic aliases, represents a more mature and personal work. It features 14 tracks that blend neo soul, Afropop, alternative pop, and urban Latin sounds. The album includes collaborations with SpokSponha, Elphomega, Alba LaMerced, Des Marks, and RJayMusiq.

The album was preceded by three singles: "Low" (2023), "Me Kisiste" (2024), and "Lo que no hago jamás" (2025). The song "Low" was written during the COVID-19 pandemic and addresses themes of anxiety and mental health. Julia has described the album as an emotional diary that reflects her personal transformation and reconnection with her essential self.

In 2025, Julia also composed the lyrics, produced, and musicalized the advertising campaign for the ANDALUZAA application, developed by the Junta de Andalucía.

== Musical style and artistry ==
Julia Martín's musical style is characterized by its genre-blending approach, incorporating elements of pop, R&B, hip hop, neo soul, soul, funk, Afrobeats, and Afropop. Her distinctive use of live looping technology allows her to create complex, layered arrangements during live performances, building songs in real-time by recording and layering vocals, instruments, and beats.

Julia's lyrics often explore themes of personal growth, mental health, and social commentary. She has been praised for her honest and direct approach to songwriting, often drawing from personal experiences and social observations.

== Personal life ==
Julia comes from an artistic family in Málaga. Her father, Paco Aguilar, is an artist and owner of the Gravura art workshop, which has exposed her to a multicultural artistic environment from a young age. Her grandfather Pedro Aguilar "Casero" was a flamenco singer, providing her with early exposure to traditional Spanish music.

== Discography ==
=== Studio albums ===
- S.U.P.E.R.R.E.A.L (2018)
- Yulai Bombay (2025)

=== Extended plays ===
- La Buena Suerte (2021) – Special edition for Rosa Montero's book

=== Singles ===
- "Low" (2023)
- "Me Kisiste" (2024)
- "Lo que no hago jamás" (2025)

== Collaborations ==
Julia has collaborated with numerous Spanish artists throughout her career:

- Guerrita – "Good Vibes" (Loto y Papiro, 2017)
- Capaz MC – "Fuerte en estereo" (20 Golpes, 2018)
- Capaz MC – "Juega y gana" (20 Golpes, 2018)
- Rayka – "Una de las nuestras" (Presenta una de las nuestras, 2018)
- Rayka – "Noespatanio" (Presenta una de las nuestras, 2018)
- Elphomega – "Bocarriba" (The Freelance, 2019)
- Da Silva – "Oye Flaca" (Malandra, 2019)
- Daniel Lozano – "The Clouds Are Gone Away" (Insight, 2020)
- Elphomega – "Flash" (Truly Yours, 2020)
- Rayka – "Blind Me" (Cazador de Sueños, 2021)
- Wasabi Cru – "I Trust You're Ready" (Green Shapes, 2022)
- Elphomega – "CRUMMY MUSIC" (The F2eelance, 2023)
- Sergio Gómez – "Moves" (On My Mind, 2024)

== Production work ==
- Ángelo Néstore – Poeta Ciborg Pecador (EP, 2021)
- Junta de Andalucía – "ANDALUZAA" (advertising campaign music and production, 2025)
