= Dubai Marathon =

Annual race in the United Arab Emirates since 1998

- Date: Sunday February 1, 2026
- Location: Dubai, United Arab Emirates
- Event type: Road
- Established: 1998 (28 years ago) Two years missed during Covid
- Course records: Men: 2:03:34 (2019) (Ethiopia) Getaneh Molla; Women: 2:16:07 (2024) Tigist Ketema
- Website: Dubai Marathon
- Participants: Up to 30,000 participants

The Dubai Marathon is an annual road-based marathon hosted by the emirate of Dubai, United Arab Emirates, since 1998. The marathon is categorized as a Gold Label Road Race by World Athletics.

== History ==
=== Initial era ===
The inaugural Dubai Marathon was held on 27 November 1998. (Note: Statements released by the race organization generally do not take this race into account when assigning ordinals to their annual races, and also often omit the race from lists dealing with event statistics.) The marathon started outside the Al Wasl Club, and ended inside the Al Wasl Stadium. About 150 runners participated, with 48 of them finishing the race.

The Association of Road Racing Statisticians (ARRS) has no record of a marathon occurring in Dubai in 1999. (Note: Because the marathon in 1998 was held on 27 November while the one in 2000 was held on 14 January, it is unlikely that another marathon was held in 1999 during the intervening 14 months. However, the marathon's general coordinator acknowledged the 2009 edition of the race as the "12th Dubai Marathon", implying that two Dubai Marathons took place before the race in 2000.)

The event changed management in 1999 for the first edition of the event officially measured and moved to January 2000 with no event in 1999 moving for better weather conditions when the IAAF Officially Measured route was measured by Grade A Course Measurer, Paul Hodgson and became a fully recognised edition for results from 2000 when held starting and finishing outside the Al Wasl Club in Dubai on Friday, January 14, 2000.

=== Current era ===
The 2000 edition of the marathon was held on 14 January; the event has usually been held on a Friday in January since.

In 2006, the marathon was postponed from 6 January to 17 February due to the sudden death of Sheikh Maktoum, Emir of Dubai, on 4 January. (Note: The race took place after a 40-day period of mourning.) The postponement meant that temperatures were higher than usual during the race, approaching 30 °C (86 °F). Winner Joseph Ngeny was originally only meant to pace the first 30 km (19 mi), but broke away from the pack once race organizers gave approval. (Note: He had called out his request, "I can finish?", while approaching the 27 km (17 mi) mark.)

In April 2007, it was announced that the prizes for the 2008 race would be one million dollars offered for a world record and $250,000 for first place for both men and women, making this the long-distance running event with the greatest cash prizes in history.

The 2008 race was won by Haile Gebrselassie with a time of 2:04:53. This was the second fastest recorded time for a marathon at that point, not fast enough to claim a world record or the million dollar prize.

The 2012 race proved to have one of the fastest finishing fields at that point: a record of four athletes finished in under two hours and five minutes. Ayele Abshero won with a course record time of 2:04:23 hours, which was the fourth fastest on the all-time lists and the fastest time ever run by an athlete running his first marathon. The other podium finishers also entered the all-time top ten: runner-up Dino Sefir became the eighth fastest man with a time of 2:04:50 hours, while Markos Geneti became the ninth fastest with a time of 2:04:54 hours. Getaneh Molla became the 13th fastest man with a time of 2:04:56 hours, and Tadese Tola became the 16th fastest with a time of 2:05:10 hours.

The women's side was also fast; for the first time in history, the top three runners of a race all finished in under two hours and twenty minutes. Aselefech Mergia finished with a time of 2:19:31 hours to win, setting an both a course record and an Ethiopian record and becoming the seventh fastest recorded woman. In her first marathon, runner-up Lucy Wangui Kabuu became the eighth fastest woman with a time of 2:19:34 hours, and Mare Dibaba became the 15th fastest woman, finishing in 2:19:52 hours. Fellow Ethiopians Bezunesh Bekele and Aberu Kebede moved up to the 16th and 17th fastest women of all time.

The 2013 event, run under a heavy fog, was also very fast. The Ethiopian winner Lelisa Desisa, won in a sprint finish of the last 200 meters with a time of 2:04:45, leading four other runners who also finished in under 2 hours, 5 minutes. On the women's side, Ethiopian Tirfi Tsegaye won with a time of 2:23:23. The top four runners on the men's side and the top six on the women's side were all Ethiopians.

In 2020, the race organizers stated that they would "not be staging a marathon/mass participation event of any format in Dubai in January 2021" due to the coronavirus pandemic.

The 2022 edition of the race was postponed to 12 February 2023 due to the 2022 FIFA World Cup hosted by Qatar, after marathon organizers realized that a shortage of accommodation in Qatar would mean that many football fans were planning to stay in Dubai during the football tournament, limiting accommodation and travel options for marathoners if the race were to be held during the tournament.

== Course ==
External images
- Course map of full marathon in 2002
- Course map of full marathon in 2020
- Course map of all races in 2020

=== Initial course ===
The course used in the inaugural race in 1998 started outside the Al Wasl Club and ended inside the Al Wasl Stadium.

=== World Trade Center course ===
The course start and finish was moved to the Dubai World Trade Centre. During the marathon, runners crossed the Dubai Creek at one point by going under it via Al Shindagha Tunnel, and at another point by going over it via Al Garhoud Bridge.

=== Current course ===
The marathon starts on Umm Suqeim Street, a few blocks southeast of Madinat Jumeirah, and finishes about a few hundred metres further southeast. The vast majority of the race is run entirely on D 94 road that runs a few blocks away from the coast, including on King Salman bin Abdulaziz al Saud Street (formerly Al Sufouh Road) and Jumeirah Beach Road.

The course first heads briefly northwest before turning southwest for an out-and-back leg of roughly 6 km (3.7 mi) of length each way on King Salman bin Abdulaziz al Saud Street, running past the entrance to the Palm Jumeirah up to around the edge of Dubai Media City, and turning around before reaching the skyscrapers immediately southwest.

After returning to Umm Suqeim Street, marathoners then continue northeast for two repetitions of an out-and-back leg of roughly 7.5 km (4.7 mi) of length each way on Jumeirah Beach Road, passing Burj Al Arab and Jumeirah Beach Hotel, and turning around on Al Mehemal Street a few hundred metres past Sunset Mall.

Afterward, the marathon turns back southeast onto Umm Suqeim Street for about 500 m (1,600 ft) for the finish.

As of 2020, the marathon course has a time limit of six hours.

== Management ==
The event is organised by Pace Events FZ LLC, with a team of qualified Officials flown in each year from Newcastle in the UK to manage the course set up and implementation. and founded by Ahmad Al Kamali.

== Sponsorship ==
In 2001, Samsung became the title sponsor for four years. (Note: Despite ARRS stating that the marathon was known as the "Samsung Dubai Marathon" from 2000 to 2004, Samsung themselves only claim to have been the title sponsor starting from 2001, and the race site itself does not appear to have begun prominently using the phrase until after the 2001 marathon.)

In 2005, Standard Chartered became the title sponsor, up until the 2020 edition of the event. They chose not to renew during Covid and the pandemic in 2021.

== Winners ==
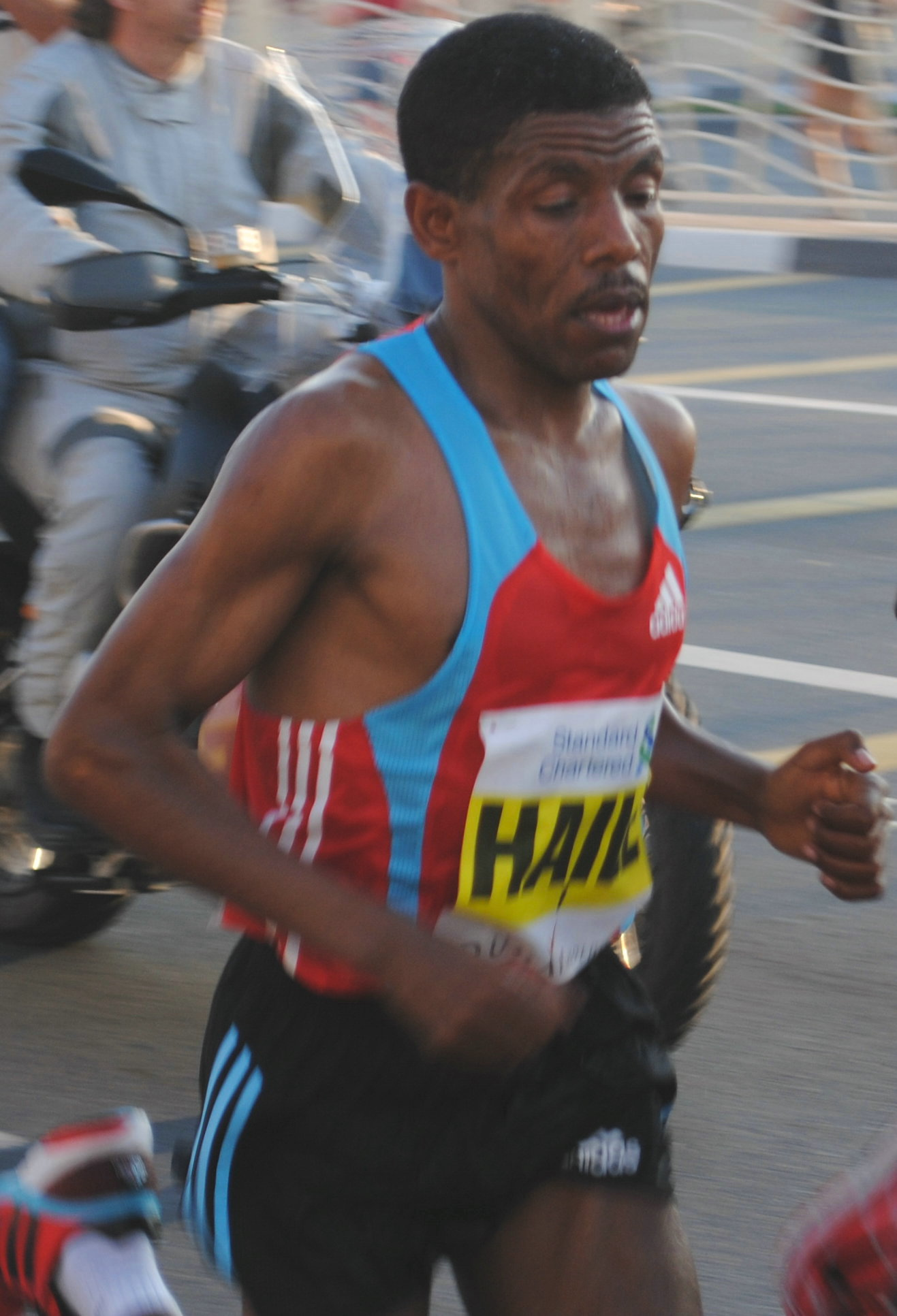
Haile Gebrselassie on his way to winning the 2010 race

Key: Course record (in bold)

=== Initial era ===
Ed.	Date	Male Winner	Time	Female Winner	Time	Rf.
1	1998.11.27	Alan Chilton (GBR)	2:23:08	Barbara Young (IND)	3:50:36	

=== Current era ===
Ed.	Date	Men's winner	Time	Women's winner	Time	Rf.
1	2000.01.14	Wilson Kibet (KEN)	2:12:21	Ramilya Burangulova (RUS)	2:40:22	
2	2001.01.12	Wilson Kibet (KEN)	2:13:36	Ramilya Burangulova (RUS)	2:37:07	
3	2002.01.11	Wilson Kibet (KEN)	2:13:04	Albina Ivanova (RUS)	2:33:31	
4	2003.01.10	Joseph Kahugu (KEN)	2:09:33	Irina Permitina (RUS)	2:36:26	
5	2004.01.09	Gashaw Melese (ETH)	2:12:49	Leila Aman (ETH)	2:42:36	
6	2005.01.07	Dejene Guta (ETH)	2:10:49	Diribe Hunde (ETH)	2:39:08	
7	2006.02.17	Joseph Ngeny (KEN)	2:13:02	Delillah Asiago (KEN)	2:43:09	
8	2007.01.12	William Rotich (KEN)	2:09:53	Askale Magarsa (ETH)	2:27:19	
9	2008.01.18	Haile Gebrselassie (ETH)	2:04:53	Berhane Adere (ETH)	2:22:42	
10	2009.01.16	Haile Gebrselassie (ETH)	2:05:29	Bezunesh Bekele (ETH)	2:24:02	
11	2010.01.22	Haile Gebrselassie (ETH)	2:06:09	Mamitu Daska (ETH)	2:24:19	
12	2011.01.21	David Barmasai Tumo (KEN)	2:07:18	Aselefech Mergia (ETH)	2:22:45	
13	2012.01.27	Ayele Abshero (ETH)	2:04:23	Aselefech Mergia (ETH)	2:19:31	
14	2013.01.25	Lelisa Desisa (ETH)	2:04:45	Tirfi Tsegaye (ETH)	2:23:23	
15	2014.01.24	Tsegaye Mekonnen (ETH)	2:04:32	Mulu Seboka (ETH)	2:25:01	
16	2015.01.23	Lemi Berhanu (ETH)	2:05:28	Aselefech Mergia (ETH)	2:20:02	
17	2016.01.22	Tesfaye Abera (ETH)	2:04:24	Tirfi Tsegaye (ETH)	2:19:41	
18	2017.01.20	Tamirat Tola (ETH)	2:04:11	Worknesh Degefa (ETH)	2:22:36	
19	2018.01.26	Mosinet Geremew (ETH)	2:04:00	Roza Dereje (ETH)	2:19:17	
20	2019.01.25	Getaneh Molla (ETH)	**2:03:34**	Ruth Chepngetich (KEN)	2:17:08	
21	2020.01.24	Olika Adugna (ETH)	2:06:15	Worknesh Degefa (ETH)	2:19:38	
—	2021	not held due to coronavirus pandemic				
—	2022	postponed due to coronavirus pandemic in Jan 2022 and subsequently in Dec due to issues with staging at same of 2022 FIFA World Cup in Doha				
22	2023.02.12	Abdisa Tola (ETH)	2:05:42	Dera Dida (ETH)	2:21:11	
23	2024.01.07	Addisu Gobena (ETH)	2:05:01	Tigist Ketema (ETH)	**2:16:07**	
24	2025.01.12	Bute Gemechu (ETH)	2:04:51	Bedatu Herpa (ETH)	2:18:27	
25	2026.02.01	Nibret Melak (ETH)	2:04:00	Anchinalu Dessie (ETH)	2:18:31	

=== Multiple wins ===
Men's
Athlete	Wins	Years
Wilson Kibet (KEN)	3	2000, 2001, 2002
Haile Gebrselassie (ETH)	3	2008, 2009, 2010

Women's
Athlete	Wins	Years
Aselefech Mergia (ETH)	3	2011, 2012, 2015
Ramilya Burangulova (RUS)	2	2000, 2001
Tirfi Tsegaye (ETH)	2	2013, 2016
Worknesh Degefa (ETH)	2	2017, 2020

=== By country ===
Country	Total	Men's	Women's
Ethiopia	33	16	17
Kenya	9	7	2
Russia	4	0	4

== See also ==
- Ras Al Khaimah Half Marathon
- Zayed International Half Marathon
