= 1987 IAAF World Cross Country Championships – Senior women's race =

Senior women's race at the 1987 IAAF World Cross Country Championships
- Organisers: IAAF
- Edition: 15th
- Date: March 22
- Host city: Warsaw, Poland
- Venue: Służewiec Racecourse
- Events: 1
- Distances: 5.05 km – Senior women
- Participation: 152 athletes from 34 nations

The Senior women's race at the 1987 IAAF World Cross Country Championships was held in Warsaw, Poland, at the Służewiec Racecourse on March 22, 1987. A report on the event was given in the Glasgow Herald and in the Evening Times.

Complete results, medallists, and the results of British athletes were published.

== Race results ==
=== Senior women's race (5.05 km) ===
==== Individual ====
Rank	Athlete	Country	Time
1st place, gold medalist(s)	Annette Sergent	France	16:46
2nd place, silver medalist(s)	Liz Lynch	Scotland	16:48
3rd place, bronze medalist(s)	Ingrid Kristiansen	Norway	16:51
4	Lynn Jennings	United States	16:55
5	Lesley Lehane	United States	16:57
6	Mariana Stanescu	Romania	17:04
7	Cornelia Bürki	Switzerland	17:08
8	Krishna Wood	Australia	17:11
9	Paula Ivan	Romania	17:12
10	Natalya Sorokivskaya	Soviet Union	17:13
11	Margaret Wairimu	Kenya	17:14
12	Martine Fays	France	17:19
13	Olga Bondarenko	Soviet Union	17:20
14	Mary Knisely	United States	17:20
15	Yelena Romanova	Soviet Union	17:23
16	Yvonne Murray	Scotland	17:24
17	Marina Rodchenkova	Soviet Union	17:25
18	Anne Viallix	France	17:25
19	Maria Lelut	France	17:30
20	Christine Benning	England	17:30
21	Delilah Asiago	Kenya	17:31
22	Maria Curatolo	Italy	17:31
23	Janet Smith	United States	17:32
24	Rosa Mota	Portugal	17:32
25	Patricia Demilly	France	17:34
26	Liève Slegers	Belgium	17:36
27	Albertina Machado	Portugal	17:36
28	Wang Xiuting	China	17:36
29	Elena Murgoci	Romania	17:37
30	Sally Ellis	England	17:38
31	Jane Shields	England	17:41
32	Nancy Tinari-Rooks	Canada	17:42
33	Gail Rear	New Zealand	17:43
34	Svetlana Ulmasova	Soviet Union	17:45
35	Maiken Sørum	Norway	17:45
36	Mary O'Connor	New Zealand	17:45
37	Monica Wambui	Kenya	17:47
38	Ana Isabel Alonso	Spain	17:47
39	Radka Naplatanova	Bulgaria	17:49
40	Ulla Marquette	Canada	17:49
41	Carole Rouillard	Canada	17:51
42	Anita Håkenstad	Norway	17:52
43	Mary Donohoe	Ireland	17:52
44	Suzanne Girard	United States	17:53
45	Susan Tooby	Wales	17:54
46	Iris Biba	West Germany	17:55
47	Roberta Brunet	Italy	17:55
48	Leah Malot	Kenya	17:56
49	Sabine Knetsch	West Germany	17:56
50	Iulia Negura	Romania	17:56
51	Conceição Ferreira	Portugal	17:57
52	Jane Ngotho	Kenya	18:00
53	Sabrina Dornhoefer	United States	18:00
54	Glenys Kroon	New Zealand	18:01
55	Tigist Moreda	Ethiopia	18:01
56	Anette Westerberg	Sweden	18:01
57	Aurora Cunha	Portugal	18:02
58	Christina Mai	West Germany	18:02
59	Montserrat Abello	Spain	18:03
60	Lynne Maddison	Wales	18:03
61	Renata Kokowska	Poland	18:03
62	Natalya Lagunkova	Soviet Union	18:04
63	Grete Kirkeberg	Norway	18:04
64	Karen MacLeod	Scotland	18:04
65	Asselefech Adera	Ethiopia	18:05
66	Marie Granberg	Sweden	18:05
67	Agnes Pardaens	Belgium	18:06
68	Teresa Recio	Spain	18:06
69	Caroline Mullen	Ireland	18:06
70	Maree McDonagh	Australia	18:07
71	Fiona Truman	England	18:07
72	Ann Middle	Wales	18:08
73	Susan Berenda	Canada	18:09
74	Danièle Kaber	Luxembourg	18:09
75	Christina Cahill	England	18:10
76	Saori Terakoshi	Japan	18:11
77	Ana Correia	Portugal	18:12
78	Antje Winkelmann	West Germany	18:12
79	Wendy Ore	Wales	18:12
80	Grazyna Kowina	Poland	18:13
81	Christine Price	Scotland	18:13
82	Sue Bruce	New Zealand	18:13
83	Vanya Gospodinova	Bulgaria	18:14
84	Iulia Besliu	Romania	18:14
85	Ana Oliveira	Portugal	18:16
86	Debbie Elsmore	New Zealand	18:17
87	Susan Sirma	Kenya	18:18
88	Carmem de Oliveira	Brazil	18:18
89	Isabella Moretti	Switzerland	18:18
90	Sachiko Yamashita	Japan	18:19
91	Corinne Debaets	Belgium	18:22
92	Anna Busko	Poland	18:23
93	Fantaye Sirak	Ethiopia	18:23
94	Adanech Erkulo	Ethiopia	18:25
95	Anne Keenan	Ireland	18:25
96	Alison Wyeth	England	18:26
97	Laura Faccio	Italy	18:27
98	Amelia Lorza Lopez	Spain	18:29
99	Véronique Collard	Belgium	18:29
100	Anna-Carin Widmark	Sweden	18:30
101	Anne Lord	Australia	18:31
102	Zhang Yanfeng	China	18:32
103	Izabella Zatorska	Poland	18:34
104	Dolores Rizo	Spain	18:35
105	Mizuyo Fukumoto	Japan	18:35
106	Rosanna Munerotto	Italy	18:36
107	Sally James	Wales	18:36
108	Astrid Schmidt	West Germany	18:37
109	Rita de Jesús	Brazil	18:38
110	Alessandra Olivari	Italy	18:39
111	Alena Mocariová	Czechoslovakia	18:43
112	Maria van Gestel	Belgium	18:43
113	Jenny Lund	Australia	18:46
114	Christine Kennedy	Ireland	18:47
115	Suman Rawat	India	18:49
116	Cindy Grant	Canada	18:51
117	Wanda Panfil	Poland	18:55
118	Addis Gezagne	Ethiopia	18:55
119	Carmen Díaz	Spain	18:56
120	Valerie O'Mahoney	Ireland	18:58
121	Ewy Palm	Sweden	18:58
122	Zheng Liyuan	China	19:01
123	Lesley Graham	New Zealand	19:02
124	Irina Theodoridou	Greece	19:03
125	Mahomi Muranaka	Japan	19:04
126	Coral Farr	Australia	19:07
127	Stefania Colombo	Italy	19:07
128	Christine Loiseau	France	19:12
129	Fatima Maama	Morocco	19:13
130	Mazal Shalom	Israel	19:14
131	Penny Rother	Scotland	19:15
132	Silvana Pereira	Brazil	19:20
133	Teresa Duffy	Northern Ireland	19:22
134	Marleen Renders	Belgium	19:26
135	Junko Kabashima	Japan	19:31
136	Nanda Shaner Yadav	India	19:31
137	Mary Friel	Ireland	19:35
138	Katie Fitzgibbon	Scotland	19:39
139	Rumyana Chavdarova	Bulgaria	19:42
140	Rossitza Ekova	Bulgaria	19:54
141	Milagro Rodriguez	Cuba	20:00
142	Paula Hawtin	Northern Ireland	20:01
143	Vijay Nilman Khalko	India	20:16
144	Ursula McKee	Northern Ireland	20:20
145	Maria Belarmino	Brazil	20:30
146	Katya Krasteva	Bulgaria	20:36
147	Purabi Daas	India	20:45
148	Emperatriz Wilson	Cuba	20:45
149	Una Barry	Northern Ireland	21:15
150	Bernadette McAllister	Northern Ireland	21:24
—	Eva Ernström	Sweden	DNF
—	Eva Svensson	Sweden	DNF

==== Teams ====
Rank	Team	Points
1st place, gold medalist(s)	United States: Lynn Jennings / 4; Lesley Lehane / 5; Mary Knisely / 14; Janet Smith / 23; (Suzanne Girard) / (44); (Sabrina Dornhoefer) / (53)	46
2nd place, silver medalist(s)	France: Annette Sergent / 1; Martine Fays / 12; Anne Viallix / 18; Maria Lelut / 19; (Patricia Demilly) / (25); (Christine Loiseau) / (128)	50
3rd place, bronze medalist(s)	Soviet Union: Natalya Sorokivskaya / 10; Olga Bondarenko / 13; Yelena Romanova / 15; Marina Rodchenkova / 17; (Svetlana Ulmasova) / (34); (Natalya Lagunkova) / (62)	55
4	Romania: Mariana Stanescu / 6; Paula Ivan / 9; Elena Murgoci / 29; Iulia Negura / 50; (Iulia Besliu) / (84)	94
5	Kenya: Margaret Wairimu / 11; Delilah Asiago / 21; Monica Wambui / 37; Leah Malot / 48; (Jane Ngotho) / (52); (Susan Sirma) / (87)	117
6	Norway: Ingrid Kristiansen / 3; Maiken Sørum / 35; Anita Håkenstad / 42; Grete Kirkeberg / 63	143
7	England: Christine Benning / 20; Sally Ellis / 30; Jane Shields / 31; Fiona Truman / 71; (Christina Cahill) / (75); (Alison Wyeth) / (96)	152
8	Portugal: Rosa Mota / 24; Albertina Machado / 27; Conceição Ferreira / 51; Aurora Cunha / 57; (Ana Correia) / (77); (Ana Oliveira) / (85)	159
9	Scotland: Liz Lynch / 2; Yvonne Murray / 16; Karen MacLeod / 64; Christine Price / 81; (Penny Rother) / (131); (Katie Fitzgibbon) / (138)	163
10	Canada: Nancy Tinari-Rooks / 32; Ulla Marquette / 40; Carole Rouillard / 41; Susan Berenda / 73; (Cindy Grant) / (116)	186
11	New Zealand: Gail Rear / 33; Mary O'Connor / 36; Glenys Kroon / 54; Sue Bruce / 82; (Debbie Elsmore) / (86); (Lesley Graham) / (123)	205
12	West Germany: Iris Biba / 46; Sabine Knetsch / 49; Christina Mai / 58; Antje Winkelmann / 78; (Astrid Schmidt) / (108)	231
13	Wales: Susan Tooby / 45; Lynne Maddison / 60; Ann Middle / 72; Wendy Ore / 79; (Sally James) / (107)	256
14	Spain: Ana Isabel Alonso / 38; Montserrat Abello / 59; Teresa Recio / 68; Amelia Lorza Lopez / 98; (Dolores Rizo) / (104); (Carmen Díaz) / (119)	263
15	Italy: Maria Curatolo / 22; Roberta Brunet / 47; Laura Faccio / 97; Rosanna Munerotto / 106; (Alessandra Olivari) / (110); (Stefania Colombo) / (127)	272
16	Belgium: Liève Slegers / 26; Agnes Pardaens / 67; Corinne Debaets / 91; Véronique Collard / 99; (Maria van Gestel) / (112); (Marleen Renders) / (134)	283
17	Australia: Krishna Wood / 8; Maree McDonagh / 70; Anne Lord / 101; Jenny Lund / 113; (Coral Farr) / (126)	292
18	Ethiopia: Tigist Moreda / 55; Asselefech Adera / 65; Fantaye Sirak / 93; Adanech Erkulo / 94; (Addis Gezagne) / (118)	307
19	Ireland: Mary Donohoe / 43; Caroline Mullen / 69; Anne Keenan / 95; Christine Kennedy / 114; (Valerie O'Mahoney) / (120); (Mary Friel) / (137)	321
20	Poland: Renata Kokowska / 61; Grazyna Kowina / 80; Anna Busko / 92; Izabella Zatorska / 103; (Wanda Panfil) / (117)	336
21	Sweden: Anette Westerberg / 56; Marie Granberg / 66; Anna-Carin Widmark / 100; Ewy Palm / 121; (Eva Ernström) / (DNF); (Eva Svensson) / (DNF)	343
22	Japan: Saori Terakoshi / 76; Sachiko Yamashita / 90; Mizuyo Fukumoto / 105; Mahomi Muranaka / 125; (Junko Kabashima) / (135)	396
23	Bulgaria: Radka Naplatanova / 39; Vanya Gospodinova / 83; Rumyana Chavdarova / 139; Rossitza Ekova / 140; (Katya Krasteva) / (146)	401
24	Brazil: Carmem de Oliveira / 88; Rita de Jesús / 109; Silvana Pereira / 132; Maria Belarmino / 145	474
25	India: Suman Rawat / 115; Nanda Shaner Yadav / 136; Vijay Nilman Khalko / 143; Purabi Daas / 147	541
26	Northern Ireland: Teresa Duffy / 133; Paula Hawtin / 142; Ursula McKee / 144; Una Barry / 149; (Bernadette McAllister) / (150)	568

- Note: Athletes in parentheses did not score for the team result

== Participation ==
An unofficial count yields the participation of 152 athletes from 34 countries in the Senior women's race. This is in agreement with the official numbers as published.

- Australia (5)
- Belgium (6)
- Brazil (4)
- Bulgaria (5)
- Canada (5)
- China (3)
- Cuba (2)
- Czechoslovakia (1)
- England (6)
- Ethiopia (5)
- France (6)
- Greece (1)
- India (4)
- Ireland (6)
- Israel (1)
- Italy (6)
- Japan (5)
- Kenya (6)
- Luxembourg (1)
- Morocco (1)
- New Zealand (6)
- Northern Ireland (5)
- Norway (4)
- Poland (5)
- Portugal (6)
- Romania (5)
- Scotland (6)
- Soviet Union (6)
- Spain (6)
- Sweden (6)
- Switzerland (2)
- United States (6)
- Wales (5)
- West Germany (5)

== See also ==
- 1987 IAAF World Cross Country Championships – Senior men's race
- 1987 IAAF World Cross Country Championships – Junior men's race
