= 1986 IAAF World Women's Road Race Championships =

The 1986 IAAF World Women's Road Race Championships was the fourth edition of the annual international road running competition organised by the International Amateur Athletics Federation (IAAF). The competition was hosted by Portugal on 9 November 1986 in Lisbon and featured one race only: a 15K run for women. There were individual and team awards available, with the national team rankings being decided by the combined finishing positions of a team's top three runners. Countries with fewer than three finishers were not ranked.

The race was won by Portugal's Aurora Cunha in a championship record time of 48:31 minutes, completing a successful defence of her titles from 1984 and 1985. Her teammate Rosa Mota finished four seconds in arrears for second place, narrowly pushing Carla Beurskens of the Netherlands in the bronze medal spot by a margin of one second. The Soviet Union won the team race, courtesy of Tatyana Kazankina, Lyudmila Matveyeva and Marina Rodchenkova, who all finished in the top ten. Cunha and Mota were joined by Albertina Dias to bring Portugal second in the team rankings, two points clear of the Marty Cooksey-led American team.

== Results ==
=== Individual ===
Rank	Athlete	Country	Time (m:s)
1st place, gold medalist(s)	Aurora Cunha	Portugal (POR)	48:31
2nd place, silver medalist(s)	Rosa Mota	Portugal (POR)	48:35
3rd place, bronze medalist(s)	Carla Beurskens	Netherlands (NED)	48:36
4	Marty Cooksey	United States (USA)	48:41
5	Tatyana Kazankina	Soviet Union (URS)	49:12
6	Lyudmila Matveyeva	Soviet Union (URS)	49:13
7	Maria Curatolo	Italy (ITA)	49:15
8	Nancy Tinari	Canada (CAN)	49:22
9	Marina Rodchenkova	Soviet Union (URS)	49:26
10	Kellie Archuletta	United States (USA)	49:42
11	Agnes Pardaens	Belgium (BEL)	49:49
12	Suzanne Girard	United States (USA)	50:12
13	Christine Loiseau	France (FRA)	50:20
14	Kerstin Pressler	West Germany (FRG)	50:23
15	Jocelyne Villeton	France (FRA)	50:30
16	Anna Villani	Italy (ITA)	50:30
17	Susan Crehan	Great Britain (GBR)	50:32
18	Danièle Kaber	Luxembourg (LUX)	50:38
19	Françoise Bonnet	France (FRA)	50:42
20	Paula Fudge	Great Britain (GBR)	50:51
21	Albertina Dias	Portugal (POR)	51:01
22	Mercedes Calleja	Spain (ESP)	51:02
23	Lynn Everington	Great Britain (GBR)	51:02
24	Iris Biba	West Germany (FRG)	51:24
25	Sharon Astley	Great Britain (GBR)	51:28
26	Nancy Ditz	United States (USA)	51:39
27	Glenys Kroon	New Zealand (NZL)	51:42
28	Marcianne Mukamurenzi	Rwanda (RWA)	51:47
29	Magda Ilands	Belgium (BEL)	51:50
30	Santa Velasquez	Mexico (MEX)	51:54
31	Vera Michallek	West Germany (FRG)	51:56
32	Anne Hilliard	Ireland (IRL)	51:56
33	Grete Hickey	Ireland (IRL)	52:01
34	Kerry Schreiber	Australia (AUS)	52:03
35	Rosanna Munerotto	Italy (ITA)	52:06
36	Carina Leutner	Austria (AUT)	52:09
37	Yelena Sipatova	Soviet Union (URS)	52:18
38	Nicola Will	Canada (CAN)	52:22
39	Olive Harford	Ireland (IRL)	52:25
40	Ana Isabel Alonso	Spain (ESP)	52:29
41	Jenny Lund	Australia (AUS)	52:47
42	Coral Farr	Australia (AUS)	52:48
43	Verena Lechner	Austria (AUT)	52:59
44	Lucilia Soares	Portugal (POR)	53:04
45	Joke van Gerwen	Netherlands (NED)	53:14
46	Christina Mai	West Germany (FRG)	53:14
47	Pia Hunter	Australia (AUS)	53:14
48	Maria-Esther Pedrosa	Spain (ESP)	53:27
49	Lesley Morton	New Zealand (NZL)	53:29
50	Stella-Maris Selles	Argentina (ARG)	53:32
51	Griselda González	Argentina (ARG)	53:35
52	Róisín Smyth	Ireland (IRL)	53:43
53	Manuela Machado	Portugal (POR)	53:51
54	?		
55	Kriscia García	El Salvador (ESA)	54:23
56	Ana Moreira	Portugal (POR)	54:26
57	Rita Krombach	Luxembourg (LUX)	54:35
58	?		
59	?		
60	?		
61	Fabiola Paoletti	Italy (ITA)	56:06
62	?		
63	?		
64	Consuelo Alonso	Spain (ESP)	56:24
65	Marisol Cossio	Bolivia (BOL)	56:26

=== Team ===
Rank	Team	Points
1st place, gold medalist(s)	Soviet Union (URS); Tatyana Kazankina; Lyudmila Matveyeva; Marina Rodchenkova	20 pts
2nd place, silver medalist(s)	Portugal (POR); Aurora Cunha; Rosa Mota; Albertina Dias	24 pts
3rd place, bronze medalist(s)	United States (USA); Marty Cooksey; Kellie Archuletta; Suzanne Girard	26 pts
