= 1985 IAAF World Women's Road Race Championships =

The 1985 IAAF World Women's Road Race Championships was the third edition of the annual international road running competition organised by the International Amateur Athletics Federation (IAAF). The competition was hosted by the United Kingdom on 3 November 1985, in Gateshead and featured one race only: a 15K run for women. This was the first time that the distance was contested at the championships, having previously been a 10K run, and this was a permanent change. There were individual and team awards available, with the national team rankings being decided by the combined finishing positions of a team's top three runners. Countries with fewer than three finishers were not ranked.

The race was won by Portugal's Aurora Cunha in a time of 49:17 minutes, completing a successful defence of her title from 1984. Judi St. Hilaire of the United States finished eight seconds later in second place, while Great Britain's Carole Bradford came third for a second year running. As she had the year before, Bradford led the British women to the team title (alongside fifth place Paula Fudge and Wendy Sly in eleventh). The Soviet Union's team, featuring Lyudmila Matveyeva in fourth and two other top ten finishers in Mariya Vasilyuk and Yelena Sipatova, was just one point behind in the team race. St Hilaire helped the American women to the bronze medal team position (backed up by Nancy Ditz and Carol McLatchie).

== Results ==
=== Individual ===
Rank	Athlete	Country	Time (m:s)
1st place, gold medalist(s)	Aurora Cunha	Portugal (POR)	49:17
2nd place, silver medalist(s)	Judi St. Hilaire	United States (USA)	49:25
3rd place, bronze medalist(s)	Carole Bradford	Great Britain (GBR)	49:59
4	Lyudmila Matveyeva	Soviet Union (URS)	50:28
5	Paula Fudge	Great Britain (GBR)	50:36
6	Donna Gould	Australia (AUS)	50:42
7	Mariya Vasilyuk	Soviet Union (URS)	50:56
8	Anna Villani	Italy (ITA)	51:00
9	Yelena Sipatova	Soviet Union (URS)	51:08
10	Ellen Wessinghage	West Germany (FRG)	51:29
11	Wendy Sly	Great Britain (GBR)	51:40
12	Dorthe Rasmussen	Denmark (DEN)	51:48
13	Tatyana Bultot	Soviet Union (URS)	51:51
14	Jill Rothwell	Great Britain (GBR)	51:53
15	Christina Mai	West Germany (FRG)	51:54
16	Nancy Ditz	United States (USA)	51:57
17	Ann Ford	Great Britain (GBR)	52:01
18	Elizabeth Franzis	West Germany (FRG)	52:06
19	Carol McLatchie	United States (USA)	52:13
20	Mami Fukao	Japan (JPN)	52:18
21	Conceição Ferreira	Portugal (POR)	52:20
22	Danièle Kaber	Luxembourg (LUX)	52:23
23	Rosanna Munerotto	Italy (ITA)	52:30
24	Elly van Hulst	Netherlands (NED)	52:32
25	Antonella Bizioli	Italy (ITA)	52:35
26	Yvonne Murray	Great Britain (GBR)	52:38
27	Lucilia Soares	Portugal (POR)	52:40
28	Sinikka Keskitalo	Finland (FIN)	52:43
29	Jiang Zhourong	China (CHN)	52:45
30	Susan Schneider	United States (USA)	52:51
31	Jocelyne Villeton	France (FRA)	52:52
32	Sheila Purves	Hong Kong (HKG)	53:05
33	Xiao Hongyan	China (CHN)	53:08
34	Maria Rebelo	France (FRA)	53:09
35	Gabriela Górzyńska	Poland (POL)	53:11
36	Ailish Smyth	Ireland (IRL)	53:15
37	Sirkku Kumpulainen	Finland (FIN)	53:17
38	Megan-Louise Sloane	Australia (AUS)	53:18
39	Françoise Bonnet	France (FRA)	53:35
40	Kristiina Iisakkila	Finland (FIN)	53:37
41	Ľudmila Melicherová	Czechoslovakia (TCH)	53:40
42	Sylviane Levesque	France (FRA)	53:42
43	Christine Kennedy	Ireland (IRL)	53:45
44	Maria-Luisa Irizar	Spain (ESP)	53:52
45	Kerstin Pressler	West Germany (FRG)	54:01
46	Mette Holm	Denmark (DEN)	54:04
47	Nikolina Shtereva	Bulgaria (BUL)	54:08
48	Aino-Maria Slej	Denmark (DEN)	54:11
49	Carolien Lucas	Netherlands (NED)	54:13
50	Malgorzata Szuminska	Poland (POL)	54:15
51	Jenny Lund	Australia (AUS)	54:20
52	Deirdre Nagle	Ireland (IRL)	54:21
53	Albertina Dias	Portugal (POR)	54:31
54	Henrietta Fina	Austria (AUT)	54:32
55	Maria-Esther Pedrosa	Spain (ESP)	54:36
56	?		
57	Tuija Toivonen	Finland (FIN)	55:02
58	Odette Lapierre	Canada (CAN)	55:11
59	Ewa Wrzosek	Poland (POL)	55:13
61	Anna Iskra	Poland (POL)	55:53
62	?		
63	Gitte Karlshøj	Denmark (DEN)	56:00
65	Maryse Justin	Mauritius (MRI)	57:01
66	?		
67	Consuelo Alonso	Spain (ESP)	57:11

=== Team ===
Rank	Team	Points
1st place, gold medalist(s)	Great Britain (GBR); Carole Bradford; Paula Fudge; Wendy Sly	19 pts
2nd place, silver medalist(s)	Soviet Union (URS); Lyudmila Matveyeva; Mariya Vasilyuk; Yelena Sipatova	20 pts
3rd place, bronze medalist(s)	United States (USA); Judi St Hilaire; Nancy Ditz; Carol McLatchie	36 pts
