= 1990 IAAF World Women's Road Race Championships =

The 1990 IAAF World Women's Road Race Championships was the eighth, and penultimate, edition of the annual international road running competition organised by the International Amateur Athletics Federation (IAAF). The competition was hosted by Ireland on 14 October 1990 in Dublin and featured one race only: a 15K run for women. There were individual and team awards available, with the national team rankings being decided by the combined finishing positions of a team's top three runners. Countries with fewer than three finishers were not ranked.

Romania's Iulia Olteanu won the race in a time of 50:11.8 – the slowest winning time recorded at the competition's history. Francie Larrieu Smith of the United States was the silver medallist and Chinese runner Zhong Huandi took bronze to feature on the podium for a second year running. Aurora Cunha led Portugal to the team title, as she had in 1987, with support from Conceição Ferreira and Lucilia Soares. The Soviet Union reached the team podium for a fifth time in as many years through the efforts of Nadezhda Stepanova, Valentina Yegorova and Lyudmila Matveyeva. A unified German team entered for the first time and former East German Katrin Dörre led the team to third place in the team rankings with former West Germans Kerstin Pressler and Christina Mai.

== Results ==
=== Individual ===
Rank	Athlete	Country	Time (m:s)
1st place, gold medalist(s)	Iulia Negură	Romania (ROM)	50:11.8
2nd place, silver medalist(s)	Francie Larrieu-Smith	United States (USA)	50:14.2
3rd place, bronze medalist(s)	Zhong Huandi	China (CHN)	50:19.0
4	Andrea Wallace	Great Britain (GBR)	50:19.5
5	Aurora Cunha	Portugal (POR)	50:26.8
6	Katrin Dörre	Germany (GER)	50:29.3
7	Nadezhda Stepanova	Soviet Union (URS)	50:31.6
8	Kerstin Pressler	Germany (GER)	50:36.4
9	Conceição Ferreira	Portugal (POR)	50:59.3
10	Valentina Yegorova	Soviet Union (URS)	51:05.6
11	Rosario Gangloff	France (FRA)	51:08.4
12	Evy Palm	Sweden (SWE)	51:24.6
13	Lucilia Soares	Portugal (POR)	51:33.5
14	Fatuma Roba	Ethiopia (ETH)	51:48.8
15	Tigist Moreda	Ethiopia (ETH)	51:49.8
16	Christina Mai	Germany (GER)	51:50.3
17	Joke Kleijweg	Netherlands (NED)	51:50.7
18	Tani Ruckle	Australia (AUS)	51:55.5
19	Iva Jurkova	Czechoslovakia (TCH)	51:57.4
20	Franziska Moser	Switzerland (SUI)	52:06.7
21	Isabella Moretti	Switzerland (SUI)	52:14.0
22	Maria-del Carmen Brunet	Spain (ESP)	52:16.8
23	Zina Marchant	Great Britain (GBR)	52:19.5
24	Anna Villani	Italy (ITA)	52:20.2
25	Maria Guida	Italy (ITA)	52:24.7
26	Georgeta State	Romania (ROM)	52:27.8
27	Ursula Noctor	Ireland (IRL)	52:29.1
28	Wang Huabi	China (CHN)	52:34.7
29	Carmen de Oliveira	Brazil (BRA)	52:39.5
30	Lyudmila Matveyeva	Soviet Union (URS)	52:39.8
31	Larisa Alekseyeva	Soviet Union (URS)	52:42.9
32	Lynn Deninno	United States (USA)	52:44.7
33	Laura LaMena	United States (USA)	52:46.0
34	Carlien Harms	Netherlands (NED)	52:56.5
35	Izabela Zatorska	Poland (POL)	53:01.6
36	Annalisa Scurti	Italy (ITA)	53:04.9
37	Anne van Schuppen	Netherlands (NED)	53:05.9
38	Tanja Kalinowski	Germany (GER)	53:09.2
39	Marjan Freriks	Netherlands (NED)	53:10.2
40	Jocelyne Villeton	France (FRA)	53:10.9
41	Carmen Fuentes	Spain (ESP)	53:13.0
42	Lesley Morton	New Zealand (NZL)	53:14.1
43	Marie-Hélène Ohier	France (FRA)	53:15.4
44	Andrea Fleischer	Germany (GER)	53:18.9
45	Wang Yongmei	China (CHN)	53:28.3
46	Mariana Chirila	Romania (ROM)	53:39.1
47	Bożena Dziubińska	Poland (POL)	53:45.1
48	Kamila Gradus	Poland (POL)	53:49.6
49	Catherine Newman	Great Britain (GBR)	53:55.5
50	María Trujillo	United States (USA)	54:07.0
51	Myriam Dumont	Belgium (BEL)	54:17.7
52	Addis Gezahegne	Ethiopia (ETH)	54:20.7
53	Rose Lambe	Ireland (IRL)	54:22.4
54	Angelines Rodríguez	Spain (ESP)	54:24.6
55	Anuța Cătună	Romania (ROM)	54:41.6
56	Patricia Griffin	Ireland (IRL)	54:44.0
57	Silvana Pereira	Brazil (BRA)	54:49.5
58	Solange de Souza	Brazil (BRA)	54:59.3
59	Ľudmila Melicherová	Czechoslovakia (TCH)	55:00.5
60	Suzanne Malaxos	Australia (AUS)	55:05.0
61	Kelly dos Santos	Brazil (BRA)	55:13.1
62	Susan Mahoney	Australia (AUS)	55:21.5
63	Marina Prat	Spain (ESP)	55:39.4
64	Susan Tooby	Great Britain (GBR)	55:44.0
65	Connie Kelly	Ireland (IRL)	55:46.9
66	Viviene Van Buggenhout	Belgium (BEL)	55:59.1
67	Marisol Cossio	Bolivia (BOL)	56:04.1
68	Julie McKie	Australia (AUS)	56:52.1
69	Julia Sakala	Zimbabwe (ZIM)	57:34.5
—	Albertina Dias	Portugal (POR)	DNF
—	Jana Bauckmannova	Czechoslovakia (TCH)	DNF
—	Alena Mocariova	Czechoslovakia (TCH)	DNF
—	Agnes Pardaens	Belgium (BEL)	DNF

=== Team ===
Rank	Team	Points
1st place, gold medalist(s)	Portugal (POR); Aurora Cunha; Conceição Ferreira; Lucilia Soares	27 pts
2nd place, silver medalist(s)	Soviet Union (URS); Nadezhda Stepanova; Valentina Yegorova; Lyudmila Matveyeva	47 pts
3rd place, bronze medalist(s)	Germany (GER); Katrin Dörre; Kerstin Pressler; Christina Mai	62 pts
