= 1987 IAAF World Women's Road Race Championships =

The 1987 IAAF World Women's Road Race Championships was the fifth edition of the annual international road running competition organised by the International Amateur Athletics Federation (IAAF). The competition was hosted by Monaco on 21 November 1987 in Monte Carlo and featured one race only: a 15K run for women. There were individual and team awards available, with the national team rankings being decided by the combined finishing positions of a team's top three runners. Countries with fewer than three finishers were not ranked.

The race was won by Ingrid Kristiansen of Norway in a championship record time of 47:17 minutes, breaking Aurora Cunha's three-year winning streak (the Portuguese was twelfth here). In a dominant display by the Norwegian, the runner-up Nancy Tinari (Canada) was over a minute and a half behind, while third-placer Maria Curatolo of Italy arrived nearly two minutes later. The team competition was won by Portugal (their first team title), led by Albertina Machado in sixth with Cunha and Conceição Ferreira in support. The Soviet Union took second place with a team of Yekaterina Khramenkova, Lyudmila Matveyeva and Marina Rodchenkova – though they matched Portugal on 32 points, they lost out on merit of a slower combined time. Great Britain was third in the team rankings, led by Paula Fudge.

== Results ==
=== Individual ===
Rank	Athlete	Country	Time (m:s)
1st place, gold medalist(s)	Ingrid Kristiansen	Norway (NOR)	47:17
2nd place, silver medalist(s)	Nancy Tinari	Canada (CAN)	48:53
3rd place, bronze medalist(s)	Maria Curatolo	Italy (ITA)	49:15
4	Malin Wästland	Sweden (SWE)	49:21
5	Yekaterina Khramenkova	Soviet Union (URS)	49:33
6	Albertina Machado	Portugal (POR)	49:35
7	Lisa Weidenbach	United States (USA)	49:41
8	Paula Fudge	Great Britain (GBR)	49:43
9	Evy Palm	Sweden (SWE)	49:48
10	Agnes Pardaens	Belgium (BEL)	49:56
11	Lyudmila Matveyeva	Soviet Union (URS)	49:59
12	Aurora Cunha	Portugal (POR)	50:04
13	Carolyn Schuwalow	Australia (AUS)	50:08
14	Albertina Dias	Portugal (POR)	50:12
15	Karolina Szabó	Hungary (HUN)	50:18
16	Marina Rodchenkova	Soviet Union (URS)	50:26
17	Teresa Ornduff	United States (USA)	50:31
18	Marina Samy	Great Britain (GBR)	50:43
19	Françoise Bonnet	France (FRA)	50:46
20	Sally Ellis	Great Britain (GBR)	50:48
21	Suzanne Malaxos	Australia (AUS)	50:52
22	Conceição Ferreira	Portugal (POR)	50:59
23	Grete Kirkeberg	Norway (NOR)	51:02
24	Elena Vyazova	Soviet Union (URS)	51:05
25	Christina Mai	West Germany (FRG)	51:08
26	Diane Gentry	United States (USA)	51:15
27	Jacqueline Perkins	Australia (AUS)	51:30
28	Elly van Hulst	Netherlands (NED)	51:30
29	Wanda Panfil	Poland (POL)	51:30
30	Rose Lambe	Ireland (IRL)	51:33
31	Barbara Kamp	Netherlands (NED)	51:38
32	María Luisa Servín	Mexico (MEX)	51:41
33	Sinikka Keskitalo	Finland (FIN)	51:48
34	Ágnes Sipka	Hungary (HUN)	51:57
35	Anni Müller	Austria (AUT)	52:06
36	Rizoneide Vanderlei	Brazil (BRA)	52:08
37	Beatriz Peralta	Mexico (MEX)	52:10
38	Emma Scaunich	Italy (ITA)	52:13
39	Sirkku Kumpulainen	Finland (FIN)	52:15
40	Christine Kennedy	Ireland (IRL)	52:15
41	Jocelyne Villeton	France (FRA)	52:16
42	Gabriela Wolf	West Germany (FRG)	52:19
43	Heléna Barócsi	Hungary (HUN)	52:22
44	Susan Crehan	Great Britain (GBR)	52:24
45	Rita Marchisio	Italy (ITA)	52:29
46	Sissel Grottenberg	Norway (NOR)	52:37
47	May Allison	Canada (CAN)	52:41
48	Maria Luisa Irizar	Spain (ESP)	52:47
49	Magda Ilands	Belgium (BEL)	52:48
50	Marita Yli-ilkka	Finland (FIN)	52:49
51	Marcianne Mukamurenzi	Rwanda (RWA)	52:52
52	Robyn Root	United States (USA)	53:04
53	Sabine Knetsch	West Germany (FRG)	53:04
54	Verena Lechner	Austria (AUT)	53:05
55	Ana Isabel Alonso	Spain (ESP)	53:09
56	Coral Farr	Australia (AUS)	53:12
57	Anita Håkenstad	Norway (NOR)	53:18
58	Griselda González	Argentina (ARG)	53:18
59	Silvana Cucchietti	Italy (ITA)	53:29
60	Silvana Pereira	Brazil (BRA)	53:30
61	Santa Velasquez	Mexico (MEX)	53:34
62	Marina Prat	Spain (ESP)	53:38
63	Sheila Purves	Hong Kong (HKG)	53:39
64	Annie van Stiphout	Netherlands (NED)	53:40
65	Marta Visnyei	Hungary (HUN)	53:42
66	Martine Van De Gehuchte	Belgium (BEL)	53:44
67	Veronique Vauzelle	France (FRA)	53:46
68	Carina Leutner	Austria (AUT)	53:49
69	Gabriela Górzyńska	Poland (POL)	53:58
70	Sylviane Levesque	France (FRA)	54:04
71	?		
72	Sirpa Kytola	Finland (FIN)	54:12
73	Addis Gezahegne	Ethiopia (ETH)	54:29
74	Zehava Shmueli	Israel (ISR)	54:48
75	Bonnie LeFrank	Canada (CAN)	54:48
76	Maria Esther Pedrosa	Spain (ESP)	54:56
77	Fabiola Oppliger	Colombia (COL)	54:59
78	?		
79	?		
80	Ailish Smyth	Ireland (IRL)	55:22
81	?		
82	?		
83	?		
84	Emily Dowling	Ireland (IRL)	56:07
85	Tigist Moreda	Ethiopia (ETH)	56:19
86	Maryse Justin	Mauritius (MRI)	56:33
87	?		
88	?		
89	?		
90	Magdalini Poulimenou	Greece (GRE)	57:12
91	Maria Polyzou	Greece (GRE)	57:53

=== Team ===
Rank	Team	Points
1st place, gold medalist(s)	Portugal (POR); Albertina Machado; Aurora Cunha; Conceição Ferreira	32 pts
2nd place, silver medalist(s)	Soviet Union (URS); Yekaterina Khramenkova; Lyudmila Matveyeva; Marina Rodchenkova	32 pts
3rd place, bronze medalist(s)	Great Britain (GBR); Paula Fudge; Marina Samy; Sally Ellis	46 pts
