= 1991 IAAF World Women's Road Race Championships =

The 1991 IAAF World Women's Road Race Championships was the ninth and final edition of the annual international road running competition organised by the International Amateur Athletics Federation (IAAF). The competition was hosted by the Netherlands on 13 October 1991 in Nieuwegein and featured one race only: a 15K run for women. There were individual and team awards available, with the national team rankings being decided by the combined finishing positions of a team's top three runners. Countries with fewer than three finishers were not ranked.

Romania's Iulia Olteanu defended her title from the 1990 race with a winning time of 48:42 minutes. In the tightest ever finish seen in the competition's history, four women finished within the space of three seconds. Andrea Wallace of Great Britain took the runner-up spot while Germany's Uta Pippig edged out Soviet athlete Nadezhda Ilyina for third place by a fraction of a second. Pippig led Germany to its first team title at the competition with the former East German being backed up by former West German teammates Kerstin Pressler and Iris Biba. The Romanian women, headed by Olteanu, were two points adrift in second, with Georgeta State in seventh and Nuța Olaru in 16th place. In third, the Soviet Union took a sixth consecutive team medal (having reached the podium on every occasion it entered a team) through the performances of Ilyina, Marina Rodchenkova and Yelena Zhupiyeva.

The ending of this championships series coincided with the IAAF launching the 1992 IAAF World Half Marathon Championships a year later, thus a women's road world championship remained in the form of the half marathon distance.

== Results ==
=== Individual ===
Rank	Athlete	Country	Time (m:s)
1st place, gold medalist(s)	Iulia Negură	Romania (ROM)	48:42
2nd place, silver medalist(s)	Andrea Wallace	Great Britain (GBR)	48:43
3rd place, bronze medalist(s)	Uta Pippig	Germany (GER)	48:44
4	Nadezhda Ilyina	Soviet Union (URS)	48:44
5	Rosanna Munerotto	Italy (ITA)	48:47
6	Kerstin Pressler	Germany (GER)	49:19
7	Georgeta State	Romania (ROM)	49:21
8	Lidia Camberg	Poland (POL)	49:24
9	Conceição Ferreira	Portugal (POR)	49:27
10	Marina Rodchenkova	Soviet Union (URS)	49:37
11	Annick Clouvel	France (FRA)	49:38
12	Manuela Dias	Portugal (POR)	49:38
13	Iris Biba	Germany (GER)	49:40
14	Odile Ohier	France (FRA)	49:46
15	Wendy Ticehurst	Australia (AUS)	49:55
16	Nuța Olaru	Romania (ROM)	50:13
17	Yelena Zhupiyeva	Soviet Union (URS)	50:14
18	Heléna Barócsi	Hungary (HUN)	50:20
19	Fatuma Roba	Ethiopia (ETH)	50:21
20	Rosario Gangloff	France (FRA)	50:24
21	Gitte Karlshøj	Denmark (DEN)	50:26
22	Birgit Jerschabek	Germany (GER)	50:30
23	Isabella Moretti	Switzerland (SUI)	50:33
24	Felicidade Sena	Portugal (POR)	50:34
25	Allison Rabour	Italy (ITA)	50:37
26	Olga Appell	Mexico (MEX)	50:41
27	Marian Sutton	Great Britain (GBR)	50:42
28	Silvana Pereira	Brazil (BRA)	50:45
29	Wilma van Onna	Netherlands (NED)	50:48
30	Rizoneide Vanderlei	Brazil (BRA)	50:50
31	María Luisa Servín	Mexico (MEX)	50:54
32	Joy Smith	United States (USA)	51:00
33	Bettina Sabatini	Italy (ITA)	51:06
34	Annette Bell	Great Britain (GBR)	51:21
35	Lucilia Soares	Portugal (POR)	51:28
36	Ceri Pritchard	Great Britain (GBR)	51:29
37	Rita de Jesus	Brazil (BRA)	51:30
38	Margareta Florea	Romania (ROM)	51:31
39	Tigist Moreda	Ethiopia (ETH)	51:32
40	Christine Toonstra	Netherlands (NED)	51:37
41	Paola Cabrera	Mexico (MEX)	51:40
42	Benita Perez	Mexico (MEX)	51:40
43	Laura LaMena	United States (USA)	51:42
44	Maria Rebelo	France (FRA)	51:49
45	Lynn Clayton	Australia (AUS)	51:50
46	Maria-del Carmen Brunet	Spain (ESP)	51:52
47	Aino-Maria Slej	Denmark (DEN)	52:04
48	Rocío Ríos	Spain (ESP)	52:10
49	Anita Palshøj	Denmark (DEN)	52:19
50	Maria-Esther Pedrosa	Spain (ESP)	52:22
51	Tanya Turney	Australia (AUS)	52:22
52	Kelly dos Santos	Brazil (BRA)	52:25
53	Jennifer Martin	United States (USA)	52:45
54	Marjan Freriks	Netherlands (NED)	52:46
55	Joke Kleijweg	Netherlands (NED)	52:53
56	Berhane Adere	Ethiopia (ETH)	53:11
57	Lynn Deninno	United States (USA)	53:40
58	Lyudmila Matveyeva	Soviet Union (URS)	53:48
59	Nelly Glauser	Switzerland (SUI)	53:56
60	Vally Sathyabhama	India (IND)	54:19
61	Vilma Sanchez	Costa Rica (CRC)	54:20
62	Anne Lord	Australia (AUS)	54:33
63	Ursula Jeitziner	Switzerland (SUI)	55:05
64	Carmen Fuentes	Spain (ESP)	55:08
65	Maryse Justin	Mauritius (MRI)	55:54
66	Sunita Godara	India (IND)	56:07

=== Team ===
Rank	Team	Points
1st place, gold medalist(s)	Germany (GER); Uta Pippig; Kerstin Pressler; Iris Biba	22 pts
2nd place, silver medalist(s)	Romania (ROM); Iulia Olteanu; Georgeta State; Nuța Olaru	23 pts
3rd place, bronze medalist(s)	Soviet Union (URS); Nadezhda Ilyina; Marina Rodchenkova; Yelena Zhupiyeva	31 pts
