= 1988 IAAF World Women's Road Race Championships =

Footrace

The 1988 IAAF World Women's Road Race Championships was the sixth edition of the annual international road running competition organised by the International Amateur Athletics Federation (IAAF). The competition was hosted by Australia on 20 March 1988 in Adelaide and featured one race only: a 15K run for women. There were individual and team awards available, with the national team rankings being decided by the combined finishing positions of a team's top three runners. Countries with fewer than three finishers were not ranked. This was the only time that the event was held in the first half of the year.

Norway's Ingrid Kristiansen defended her title with a winning time of 48:24 minutes. Wang Xiuting of China was runner-up nearly two minutes behind and was shortly followed by Zoya Ivanova, who took third place ten seconds later. Ivanova led a Soviets to a comfortable win in the team competition with a total of 21 points coming from her, Yekaterina Khramenkova and Lyudmila Matveyeva. China, entering the competition for the first time took second in the team race through Wang, fourth-placed Zhong Huandi and Wang Huabi in 25th. Portugal, the defending team champions, were led to third place by Conceição Ferreira.

== Results ==
=== Individual ===
Rank	Athlete	Country	Time (m:s)
1st place, gold medalist(s)	Ingrid Kristiansen	Norway (NOR)	48:24
2nd place, silver medalist(s)	Wang Xiuting	China (CHN)	50:18
3rd place, bronze medalist(s)	Zoya Ivanova	Soviet Union (URS)	50:28
4	Zhong Huandi	China (CHN)	50:29
5	Malin Wästland	Sweden (SWE)	50:42
6	Yekaterina Khramenkova	Soviet Union (URS)	50:43
7	Lizanne Bussières	Canada (CAN)	50:46
8	Conceição Ferreira	Portugal (POR)	50:51
9	Tani Ruckle	Australia (AUS)	50:59
10	Jocelyne Villeton	France (FRA)	51:00
11	Marty Cooksey	United States (USA)	51:07
12	Lyudmila Matveyeva	Soviet Union (URS)	51:30
13	Albertina Dias	Portugal (POR)	51:38
14	Maria Curatolo	Italy (ITA)	51:46
15	Kerstin Pressler	West Germany (FRG)	51:49
16	Albertina Machado	Portugal (POR)	51:55
17	Susan Schneider	United States (USA)	51:56
18	Ann Ross	New Zealand (NZL)	52:03
19	Yuki Tamura	Japan (JPN)	52:12
20	Małgorzata Birbach	Poland (POL)	52:19
21	Sinikka Keskitalo	Finland (FIN)	52:25
22	Bente Moe	Norway (NOR)	52:36
23	Marina Rodchenkova	Soviet Union (URS)	52:37
24	Kellie Archuletta	United States (USA)	52:43
25	Wang Huabi	China (CHN)	52:44
26	Päivi Tikkanen	Finland (FIN)	52:56
27	Grete Kirkeberg	Norway (NOR)	52:59
28	Delilah Asiago	Kenya (KEN)	53:00
29	Susan Crehan	Great Britain (GBR)	53:00
30	Jane Ngotho	Kenya (KEN)	53:06
31	Gabriela Wolf	West Germany (FRG)	53:18
32	Sirkku Kumpulainen	Finland (FIN)	53:25
33	Sheila Purves	Hong Kong (HKG)	53:29
34	Jane Welzel	United States (USA)	53:31
35	Kazue Kojima	Japan (JPN)	53:40
36	Janeth Mayal	Brazil (BRA)	53:43
37	Rose Lambe	Ireland (IRL)	53:49
38	Cassandra Mihailovic	France (FRA)	53:53
39	Anni Müller	Austria (AUT)	53:59
40	Christina Mai	West Germany (FRG)	54:08
41	?		
42	?		
43	Maria Guida	Italy (ITA)	54:14
44	Sandra Branney	Great Britain (GBR)	54:18
45	Griselda González	Argentina (ARG)	54:29
46	Eva Svensson	Sweden (SWE)	54:35
47	Kerry Schreiber	Australia (AUS)	54:39
48	Stefania Colombo	Italy (ITA)	54:44
49	Patricia Griffin	Ireland (IRL)	54:45
50	Linda Milo	Belgium (BEL)	54:45
51	Veronique Vauzelle	France (FRA)	54:52
52	Sissel Grottenberg	Norway (NOR)	55:02
53	Lesley Morton	New Zealand (NZL)	55:16
54	Shireen Barbour	Great Britain (GBR)	55:25
55	Bettina Sabatini	Italy (ITA)	55:27
56	Stella-Maris Selles	Argentina (ARG)	55:46
57	Glenys Kroon	New Zealand (NZL)	55:47
58	Susan Sirma	Kenya (KEN)	55:54
59	Viviene Van Buggenhout	Belgium (BEL)	55:58
60	Coral Farr	Australia (AUS)	56:10
61	Maryse Justin	Mauritius (MRI)	57:00
62	Martine Van De Gehuchte	Belgium (BEL)	57:04
63	Carolyn Naisby	Great Britain (GBR)	57:07
64	Yuko Gordon	Hong Kong (HKG)	57:11
65	?		
66	Wendy Breed	New Zealand (NZL)	57:54
67	Jenny Lund	Australia (AUS)	57:59
DNF	Sabine Knetsch	West Germany (FRG)	DNF
DNF	Grażyna Kowina	Poland (POL)	DNF
DNF	Satu Levelä	Finland (FIN)	DNF
DNF	Li Xiuxia	China (CHN)	DNF
DNF	Silvana Pereira	Brazil (BRA)	DNF
DNF	Rizoneide Vanderlei	Brazil (BRA)	DNF

=== Team ===
Rank	Team	Points
1st place, gold medalist(s)	Soviet Union (URS); Zoya Ivanova; Yekaterina Khramenkova; Lyudmila Matveyeva	21 pts
2nd place, silver medalist(s)	China (CHN); Wang Xiuting; Zhong Huandi; Wang Huabi	31 pts
3rd place, bronze medalist(s)	Portugal (POR); Conceição Ferreira; Albertina Dias; Albertina Machado	37 pts
