= IAAF World Women's Road Race Championships =

Annual international athletics championship in road running

The IAAF World Women's Road Race Championships was an annual international athletics championship in road running organised by the International Association of Athletics Federations (then known as the International Amateur Athletics Federation). It was contested from 1983 to 1991, before being replaced by the IAAF World Half Marathon Championships in 1992, an event for both men and women.

The event was a 10 km race in 1983 and 1984, then a 15 km race from 1985 to 1991.

== Editions ==
Edition	Year	City	Country
1st	1983	San Diego	United States
2nd	1984	Madrid	Spain
3rd	1985	Gateshead	United Kingdom
4th	1986	Lisbon	Portugal
5th	1987	Monte Carlo	Monaco
6th	1988	Adelaide	Australia
7th	1989	Rio de Janeiro	Brazil
8th	1990	Dublin	Ireland
9th	1991	Nieuwegein	Netherlands

== Medalists ==
=== Individual ===
Year	Gold		Silver		Bronze	
1983	Wendy Sly (GBR)	32:23	Betty Springs (USA)	32:23	Lesley Welch (USA)	32:41
1984	Aurora Cunha (POR)	33:04	Rosa Mota (POR)	33:18	Carole Bradford (GBR)	33:25
1985	Aurora Cunha (POR)	49:17	Judi St. Hilaire (USA)	49:25	Carole Bradford (GBR)	49:59
1986	Aurora Cunha (POR)	48:31	Rosa Mota (POR)	48:35	Carla Beurskens (NED)	48:36
1987	Ingrid Kristiansen (NOR)	47:17	Nancy Tinari (CAN)	48:53	Maria Curatolo (ITA)	49:15
1988	Ingrid Kristiansen (NOR)	48:24	Wang Xiuting (CHN)	50:18	Zoya Ivanova (URS)	50:28
1989	Wang Xiuting (CHN)	49:34	Zhong Huandi (CHN)	49:44	Aurora Cunha (POR)	50:06
1990	Iulia Negura (ROM)	50:14	Francie Larrieu-Smith (USA)	50:15	Zhong Huandi (CHN)	50:19
1991	Iulia Negura (ROM)	48:42	Andrea Wallace (GBR)	48:43	Uta Pippig (GER)	48:44

=== Team ===
- Team medals were decided by adding the positions of the leading three team members, except in 1984, when the times of the three leading team members were added.

Year	Gold		Silver		Bronze	
1983	United States	12	Canada	19	Ireland	32
1984	Great Britain	1:41:24	United States	1:42:33	Portugal	1:43:11
1985	Great Britain	19	Soviet Union	20	United States	36
1986	Soviet Union	20	Portugal	24	United States	26
1987	Portugal	32	Soviet Union	32	Great Britain	46
1988	Soviet Union	21	China	31	Portugal	37
1989	China	10	Portugal	15	Soviet Union	24
1990	Portugal	27	Soviet Union	47	West Germany	62
1991	Germany	22	Romania	24	Soviet Union	31

== Individual Results ==
=== San Diego 1983 (10 km) ===
66 starters. 62 finishers

Rank	Athlete	Time
Gold medal	Wendy Sly (GBR)	32:23
Silver medal	Betty Springs (USA)	32:23
Bronze medal	Lesley Welch (USA)	32:41
4th	Nancy Rooks (CAN)	32:57
5th	Dorthe Rasmussen (DEN)	33:03
6th	Midde Hamrin (SWE)	33:06
7th	Sylvie Ruegger (CAN)	33:06
8th	Monica Joyce (IRL)	33:14
9th	Ellen Hart (USA)	33:15
10th	Lisa Martin (AUS)	33:19

=== Madrid 1984 (10 km) ===
54 finishers.

Rank	Athlete	Time
Gold medal	Aurora Cunha (POR)	33:04
Silver medal	Rosa Mota (POR)	33:18
Bronze medal	Carole Bradford (GBR)	33:25
4	Debbie Peel (GBR)	33:51
5	Anne Marie Malone (CAN)	34:01
6	Sally Pierson (AUS)	34:05
7	Carol Haigh (GBR)	34:08
8	Monica Joyce (IRE)	34:09
9	Gail Kingma (USA)	34:12
10	Jeanette Nordgren (SWE)	34:13

=== Gateshead 1985 (15 km) ===
67 finishers.

Rank	Athlete	Time
Gold medal	Aurora Cunha (POR)	49:17
Silver medal	Judi St. Hilaire (USA)	49:25
Bronze medal	Carole Bradford (GBR)	49:59
4th	Lyudmila Matveyeva (URS)	50:28
5th	Paula Fudge (GBR)	50:36
6th	Donna Gould (AUS)	50:42
7th	Mariya Vasilyuk (URS)	50:56
8th	Anna Villani (ITA)	51:00
9th	Yelena Sipatova (URS)	51:08
10th	Ellen Wessinhage (FRG)	51:29

=== Lisbon 1986 (15 km) ===
75 finishers.

Rank	Athlete	Time
Gold medal	Aurora Cunha (POR)	48:31
Silver medal	Rosa Mota (POR)	48:35
Bronze medal	Carla Beurskens (NED)	48:36
4	Marty Cooksey (USA)	48:41
5	Tatyana Kazankina (URS)	49:12
6	Lyudmila Matveyeva (URS)	49:13
7	Maria Curatolo (ITA)	49:14
8	Nancy Rooks (CAN)	49:22
9	Marina Rodchenkova (URS)	49:26
10	Kellie Cathey (USA)	49:42

=== Monte Carlo 1987 (15 km) ===
110 starters. 103 finishers.

Rank	Athlete	Time
Gold medal	Ingrid Kristiansen (NOR)	47:17
Silver medal	Nancy Tinari (CAN)	48:53
Bronze medal	Maria Curatolo (ITA)	49:15
4	Malin Wästlund (SWE)	49:21
5	Yekaterina Khramenkova (URS)	49:33
6	Albertina Machado (POR)	49:35
7	Lisa Weidenbach (USA)	49:41
8	Paula Fudge (GBR)	49:43
9	Evy Palm (SWE)	49:48
10	Agnes Pardaens (BEL)	49:56

=== Adelaide 1988 (15 km) ===
77 starters. 70 finishers.

Rank	Athlete	Time
Gold medal	Ingrid Kristiansen (NOR)	48:24
Silver medal	Wang Xiuting (CHN)	50:18
Bronze medal	Zoya Ivanova (URS)	50:28
4	Zhong Huandi (CHN)	50:29
5	Malin Wästlund (SWE)	50:42
6	Yekaterina Khramenkova (URS)	50:43
7	Lizanne Bussieres (CAN)	50:46
8	Conceição Ferreira (POR)	50:51
9	Tani Ruckle (AUS)	50:59
10	Jocelyn Villeton (FRA)	51:00

=== Rio de Janeiro 1989 (15 km) ===
85 starters. 68 finishers.

Rank	Athlete	Time
Gold medal	Wang Xiuting (CHN)	49:34
Silver medal	Zhong Huandi (CHN)	50:06
Bronze medal	Aurora Cunha (POR)	50:06
4.	Albertina Machado (POR)	50:16
5.	Yekaterina Khramenkova (URS)	50:21
6.	Jill Hunter (GBR)	50:34
7	Wang Huabi (CHN)	50:42
8	Albertina Dias (POR)	50:59
9	Nadyezhda Stepanova (URS)	51:05
10	Irina Yagodina (URS)	51:06

=== Dublin 1990 (15 km) ===
83 starters. 77 finishers.

Rank	Athlete	Time
Gold medal	Iulia Negura (ROM)	50:12
Silver medal	Francie Larrieu-Smith (USA)	50:15
Bronze medal	Zhong Huandi (CHN)	50:19
4	Andrea Wallace (GBR)	50:20
5	Aurora Cunha (POR)	50:27
6	Katrin Dorre (GDR)	50:30
7	Nadezhda Galliamova (URS)	50:32
8	Kerstin Pressler (FRG)	50:37
9	Conceição Ferreira (POR)	51:00
10	Valentina Yegorova (URS)	51:06

=== Nieuwegein 1991 (15 km) ===
70 finishers.

Rank	Athlete	Time
Gold medal	Iulia Negura (ROM)	48:42
Silver medal	Andrea Wallace (GBR)	48:43
Bronze medal	Uta Pippig (GER)	48:44
4	Nadezhda Ilyina (URS)	48:44
5	Rosanna Munerotto (ITA)	48:47
6	Kerstin Pressler (GER)	49:19
7	Georgetta Stage (ROM)	49:21
8	Lidia Camberg (POL)	49:24
9	Conceição Ferreira (POR)	49:27
10	Marina Rodchenkova (URS)	49:37
