= 1986 IAAF World Cross Country Championships – Senior women's race =

Senior women's race at the 1986 IAAF World Cross Country Championships
- Organisers: IAAF
- Edition: 14th
- Date: March 23
- Host city: Colombier, Neuchâtel, Switzerland
- Venue: Planeyse Colombier
- Events: 1
- Distances: 4.65 km – Senior women
- Participation: 161 athletes from 36 nations

The Senior women's race at the 1986 IAAF World Cross Country Championships was held in Colombier, Neuchâtel, Switzerland, at the Planeyse Colombier on March 23, 1986. A report on the event was given in the Glasgow Herald and in the Evening Times.

Complete results, medallists, and the results of British athletes were published.

== Race results ==
=== Senior women's race (4.65 km) ===
==== Individual ====
Rank	Athlete	Country	Time
1st place, gold medalist(s)	Zola Budd	England	14:49.6
2nd place, silver medalist(s)	Lynn Jennings	United States	15:07.8
3rd place, bronze medalist(s)	Annette Sergent	France	15:12.2
4	Martine Fays	France	15:14.3
5	Rosa Mota	Portugal	15:18.5
6	Nan Doak	United States	15:22.8
7	Christine McMiken	New Zealand	15:23.6
8	Albertina Machado	Portugal	15:24.4
9	Elena Fidatof	Romania	15:25.3
10	Carole Bradford	England	15:27.5
11	Liève Slegers	Belgium	15:28.3
12	Lyudmila Matveyeva	Soviet Union	15:28.6
13	Renata Kokowska	Poland	15:30.9
14	Cornelia Bürki	Switzerland	15:32
15	Grete Kirkeberg	Norway	15:32.4
16	Marina Rodchenkova	Soviet Union	15:32.7
17	Elizabeth Franzis	West Germany	15:33.1
18	Gail Rear	New Zealand	15:33.3
19	Mary O'Connor	New Zealand	15:33.6
20	Ruth Partridge	England	15:34
21	Christine Sørum	Norway	15:34.7
22	Aurora Cunha	Portugal	15:35
23	Wendy Renner	New Zealand	15:35.4
24	Susi Riermeier	West Germany	15:35.8
25	Marcella Robertson	Scotland	15:36.8
26	Anne Viallix	France	15:37.7
27	Dorthe Rasmussen	Denmark	15:38.1
28	Paula Ivan	Romania	15:38.5
29	Eva Ernström	Sweden	15:39.1
30	Anita Håkenstad	Norway	15:39.6
31	Mariana Stanescu	Romania	15:40.3
32	Sue Bruce	New Zealand	15:40.6
33	Debbie Elsmore	New Zealand	15:41.2
34	Jane Shields	England	15:43.4
35	Betty Springs	United States	15:45.5
36	Krishna Wood	Australia	15:46.7
37	Mercedes Calleja	Spain	15:48
38	Yvonne Murray	Scotland	15:48.7
39	Sabrina Dornhoefer	United States	15:50
40	Julie Laughton	England	15:50.8
41	Charlotte Teske	West Germany	15:51.9
42	Sirkku Kumpulainen	Finland	15:52.3
43	Jacqueline Lefeuvre	France	15:52.7
44	Maria Lelut	France	15:53.2
45	Teresa Recio	Spain	15:53.5
46	Betty van Steenbroeck	Belgium	15:53.8
47	Christina Mai	West Germany	15:54
48	Agnese Possamai	Italy	15:54.6
49	Yelena Sipatova	Soviet Union	15:54.9
50	Susan Berenda	Canada	15:55.7
51	Sandra Gasser	Switzerland	15:56.6
52	Carmem de Oliveira	Brazil	15:57.1
53	Anne Lord	Australia	15:57.3
54	Leslie Seymour	United States	15:57.6
55	Montserrat Abello	Spain	15:57.9
56	Hassania Darami	Morocco	15:58.2
57	Christine Price	Scotland	15:58.5
58	Asuncion Sinobas	Spain	15:59.5
59	Tigist Moreda	Ethiopia	15:59.8
60	Maria van Gestel	Belgium	16:00.4
61	Mary Donohoe	Ireland	16:00.9
62	Martine Oppliger	Switzerland	16:01.2
63	Irina Mozharova	Soviet Union	16:01.4
64	Debbie Bowker	Canada	16:03
65	Ingrid Delagrange	Belgium	16:03.8
66	Jenny Lund	Australia	16:04.1
67	Brenda Webb	United States	16:04.5
68	Francine Peeters	Belgium	16:06
69	Astrid Schmidt	West Germany	16:06.3
70	Isabelle Matthys	France	16:06.5
71	Adanech Workula	Ethiopia	16:06.8
72	Ilinca Mitrea	Romania	16:07.1
73	Viorica Ghican	Romania	16:07.4
74	Tania Turney	Australia	16:07.6
75	Anne Jorun Flaten	Norway	16:07.9
76	Rita Marchisio	Italy	16:08.2
77	Susan Tooby	Wales	16:08.4
78	Kumi Araki	Japan	16:09.1
79	Carole Rouillard	Canada	16:09.7
80	Hassiba Boulmerka	Algeria	16:10.6
81	Fatima Paz	Spain	16:11.6
82	Margreet Verbeek	Netherlands	16:12.8
83	Fernanda Marques	Portugal	16:13.3
84	Asselefech Adera	Ethiopia	16:13.6
85	Fantaye Sirak	Ethiopia	16:14.2
86	Lidia Camberg	Poland	16:14.9
87	Anna Rybicka	Poland	16:15.1
88	Rosanna Munerotto	Italy	16:16.1
89	Marina Vasilyuk	Soviet Union	16:16.7
90	Marie Granberg	Sweden	16:17
91	Anna Busko	Poland	16:17.4
92	Betty Molteni	Italy	16:17.9
93	Eriko Asai	Japan	16:18.2
94	Mébarka El Hadj Abdellah	Algeria	16:19.1
95	Linda Milo	Belgium	16:19.5
96	Penny Just	Australia	16:19.8
97	Mami Fukao	Japan	16:20.1
98	Leanor Costa	Portugal	16:22.2
99	Lucilia Soares	Portugal	16:22.3
100	Angélica de Almeida	Brazil	16:22.4
101	Karen MacLeod	Scotland	16:22.5
102	Sinikka Keskitalo	Finland	16:22.8
103	Yuki Tamura	Japan	16:22.9
104	Brenda Shackleton	Canada	16:23
105	Gaylene Clews	Australia	16:23.1
106	Małgorzata Birbach	Poland	16:23.4
107	Jean Lorden	Scotland	16:24.4
108	Maureen de St. Croix	Canada	16:27
109	Melissa Watson	Wales	16:27.2
110	Ann Hilliard	Ireland	16:30.3
111	Helen Comsa	Switzerland	16:31.8
112	Estela Estévez	Spain	16:32.7
113	Danièle Kaber	Luxembourg	16:41.4
114	Alessandra Corti	Italy	16:41.9
115	Kersti Jakobsen	Denmark	16:42.4
116	Genoveva Eichenmann	Switzerland	16:43
117	Ann Roblin	Wales	16:43.5
118	Mette Holm Hansen	Denmark	16:44.1
119	Valerie O'Mahoney	Ireland	16:44.8
120	Angela Chalmers	Canada	16:45.8
121	Mary Friel	Ireland	16:46.7
122	Ann-Marie Fox	Wales	16:47.2
123	Izabella Zatorska	Poland	16:48
124	Daria Nauer	Switzerland	17:02.4
125	Gitte Karlshøj	Denmark	17:03.8
126	Fatima Maama	Morocco	17:04.8
127	Yoshiko Hidaka	Japan	17:09.1
128	Greta Hickey	Ireland	17:19.7
129	Lynne Maddison	Wales	17:23.3
130	Patricia Griffin	Ireland	17:24.4
131	Wilma Rusman	Netherlands	17:25.6
132	Suman Rawat	India	17:26.9
133	Hanne Kjärsgaard	Denmark	17:27.9
134	Cássia Pegado	Brazil	17:28.6
135	Sally James	Wales	17:29
136	Maryse Justin	Mauritius	17:29.7
137	Dalvirene de Paiva	Brazil	17:30.5
138	Rakiya Maraoui	Morocco	17:32
139	June Standing	Scotland	17:33
140	Marjan Freriks	Netherlands	17:34.3
141	Ilse Riedeman	Netherlands	17:35.2
142	Saadia Bendenoune	Morocco	17:35.7
143	Teresa Duffy	Northern Ireland	17:37
144	Surjit Kaur	India	17:38
145	Krista Aukema	Netherlands	17:40.1
146	Saida Hamama	Morocco	17:42.6
147	Ileana Arroyo	Puerto Rico	17:45.6
148	Barbara Harkness	Northern Ireland	17:56.8
149	Carmen Martinez	Puerto Rico	18:02.7
150	Vijay Nilman Khalko	India	18:10.4
151	Jana Kuceriková	Czechoslovakia	18:13.2
152	Paula Hawtin	Northern Ireland	18:15.9
153	Noelle Harron	Northern Ireland	18:24
154	Carmen Vega	Puerto Rico	18:28
155	Ita Speight	Northern Ireland	18:30
156	M. Permanik	India	18:37.5
157	Betty Sarmiyati	Indonesia	18:53.7
158	Rosita Ocasio	Puerto Rico	18:59.7
159	Nirmala Nair	India	19:04
160	Purabi Daas	India	19:18
161	Elizabeth Gladfelter	U.S. Virgin Islands	21:23.3

==== Teams ====
Rank	Team	Points
1st place, gold medalist(s)	England: Zola Budd / 1; Carole Bradford / 10; Ruth Partridge / 20; Jane Shields / 34; (Julie Laughton) / (40)	65
2nd place, silver medalist(s)	New Zealand: Christine McMiken / 7; Gail Rear / 18; Mary O'Connor / 19; Wendy Renner / 23; (Sue Bruce) / (32); (Debbie Elsmore) / (33)	67
3rd place, bronze medalist(s)	France: Annette Sergent / 3; Martine Fays / 4; Anne Viallix / 26; Jacqueline Lefeuvre / 43; (Maria Lelut) / (44); (Isabelle Matthys) / (70)	76
4	United States: Lynn Jennings / 2; Nan Doak / 6; Betty Springs / 35; Sabrina Dornhoefer / 39; (Leslie Seymour) / (54); (Brenda Webb) / (67)	82
5	Portugal: Rosa Mota / 5; Albertina Machado / 8; Aurora Cunha / 22; Fernanda Marques / 83; (Leanor Costa) / (98); (Lucilia Soares) / (99)	118
6	West Germany: Elizabeth Franzis / 17; Susi Riermeier / 24; Charlotte Teske / 41; Christina Mai / 47; (Astrid Schmidt) / (69)	129
7	Soviet Union: Lyudmila Matveyeva / 12; Marina Rodchenkova / 16; Yelena Sipatova / 49; Irina Mozharova / 63; (Marina Vasilyuk) / (89)	140
8	Romania: Elena Fidatof / 9; Paula Ivan / 28; Mariana Stanescu / 31; Ilinca Mitrea / 72; (Viorica Ghican) / (73)	140
9	Norway: Grete Kirkeberg / 15; Christine Sørum / 21; Anita Håkenstad / 30; Anne Jorun Flaten / 75	141
10	Belgium: Liève Slegers / 11; Betty van Steenbroeck / 46; Maria van Gestel / 60; Ingrid Delagrange / 65; (Francine Peeters) / (68); (Linda Milo) / (95)	182
11	Spain: Mercedes Calleja / 37; Teresa Recio / 45; Montserrat Abello / 55; Asuncion Sinobas / 58; (Fatima Paz) / (81); (Estela Estévez) / (112)	195
12	Scotland: Marcella Robertson / 25; Yvonne Murray / 38; Christine Price / 57; Karen MacLeod / 101; (Jean Lorden) / (107); (June Standing) / (139)	221
13	Australia: Krishna Wood / 36; Anne Lord / 53; Jenny Lund / 66; Tania Turney / 74; (Penny Just) / (96); (Gaylene Clews) / (105)	229
14	Switzerland: Cornelia Bürki / 14; Sandra Gasser / 51; Martine Oppliger / 62; Helen Comsa / 111; (Genoveva Eichenmann) / (116); (Daria Nauer) / (124)	238
15	Poland: Renata Kokowska / 13; Lidia Camberg / 86; Anna Rybicka / 87; Anna Busko / 91; (Małgorzata Birbach) / (106); (Izabella Zatorska) / (123)	277
16	Canada: Susan Berenda / 50; Debbie Bowker / 64; Carole Rouillard / 79; Brenda Shackleton / 104; (Maureen de St. Croix) / (108); (Angela Chalmers) / (120)	297
17	Ethiopia: Tigist Moreda / 59; Adanech Workula / 71; Asselefech Adera / 84; Fantaye Sirak / 85	299
18	Italy: Agnese Possamai / 48; Rita Marchisio / 76; Rosanna Munerotto / 88; Betty Molteni / 92; (Alessandra Corti) / (114)	304
19	Japan: Kumi Araki / 78; Eriko Asai / 93; Mami Fukao / 97; Yuki Tamura / 103; (Yoshiko Hidaka) / (127)	371
20	Denmark: Dorthe Rasmussen / 27; Kersti Jakobsen / 115; Mette Holm Hansen / 118; Gitte Karlshøj / 125; (Hanne Kjärsgaard) / (133)	385
21	Ireland: Mary Donohoe / 61; Ann Hilliard / 110; Valerie O'Mahoney / 119; Mary Friel / 121; (Greta Hickey) / (128); (Patricia Griffin) / (130)	411
22	Brazil: Carmem de Oliveira / 52; Angélica de Almeida / 100; Cássia Pegado / 134; Dalvirene de Paiva / 137	423
23	Wales: Susan Tooby / 77; Melissa Watson / 109; Ann Roblin / 117; Ann-Marie Fox / 122; (Lynne Maddison) / (129); (Sally James) / (135)	425
24	Morocco: Hassania Darami / 56; Fatima Maama / 126; Rakiya Maraoui / 138; Saadia Bendenoune / 142; (Saida Hamama) / (146)	462
25	Netherlands: Margreet Verbeek / 82; Wilma Rusman / 131; Marjan Freriks / 140; Ilse Riedeman / 141; (Krista Aukema) / (145)	494
26	India: Suman Rawat / 132; Surjit Kaur / 144; Vijay Nilman Khalko / 150; M. Permanik / 156; (Nirmala Nair) / (159); (Purabi Daas) / (160)	582
27	Northern Ireland: Teresa Duffy / 143; Barbara Harkness / 148; Paula Hawtin / 152; Noelle Harron / 153; (Ita Speight) / (155)	596
28	Puerto Rico: Ileana Arroyo / 147; Carmen Martinez / 149; Carmen Vega / 154; Rosita Ocasio / 158	608

- Note: Athletes in parentheses did not score for the team result

== Participation ==
An unofficial count yields the participation of 161 athletes from 36 countries in the Senior women's race. This is in agreement with the official numbers as published.

- Algeria (2)
- Australia (6)
- Belgium (6)
- Brazil (4)
- Canada (6)
- Czechoslovakia (1)
- Denmark (5)
- England (5)
- Ethiopia (4)
- Finland (2)
- France (6)
- India (6)
- Indonesia (1)
- Ireland (6)
- Italy (5)
- Japan (5)
- Luxembourg (1)
- Mauritius (1)
- Morocco (5)
- Netherlands (5)
- New Zealand (6)
- Northern Ireland (5)
- Norway (4)
- Poland (6)
- Portugal (6)
- Puerto Rico (4)
- Romania (5)
- Scotland (6)
- Soviet Union (5)
- Spain (6)
- Sweden (2)
- Switzerland (6)
- United States (6)
- U.S. Virgin Islands (1)
- Wales (6)
- West Germany (5)

== See also ==
- 1986 IAAF World Cross Country Championships – Senior men's race
- 1986 IAAF World Cross Country Championships – Junior men's race
