= 1984 IAAF World Women's Road Race Championships =

The 1984 IAAF World Women's Road Race Championships was the second edition of the annual international road running competition organised by the International Amateur Athletics Federation (IAAF). The competition was hosted by Spain on 11 November 1984 in Madrid and featured one race only: a 10K run for women. There were individual and team awards available, with the national team rankings being decided by the combined times of a team's three best athletes (the only time this ranking system was used at the competition, as opposed to combined finishing positions). Countries with fewer than three finishers were not ranked.

The race was won by Aurora Cunha of Portugal in a time of 33:04. She was followed shortly after by her teammate Rosa Mota, while Great Britain's Carole Bradford took third place. Bradford led the British women's team to the team title, with Deborah-Ann Peel in fourth and Carol Greenwood in seventh to provide a combined winning time of 1:41:24 hours. Just over a minute behind on time was Portugal (Conceição Ferreira in 29th being the third runner) and the United States team led by ninth-placed Gail Kingma rounded out the team podium.

== Results ==
=== Individual ===
Rank	Athlete	Country	Time (m:s)
1st place, gold medalist(s)	Aurora Cunha	Portugal (POR)	33:04
2nd place, silver medalist(s)	Rosa Mota	Portugal (POR)	33:18
3rd place, bronze medalist(s)	Carole Bradford	Great Britain (GBR)	33:25
4	Debbie Peel	Great Britain (GBR)	33:51
5	Anna Marie Malone	Canada (CAN)	34:01
6	Sally Pierson	Australia (AUS)	34:05
7	Carol Greenwood	Great Britain (GBR)	34:08
8	Monica Joyce	Ireland (IRL)	34:09
9	Gail Kingma	United States (USA)	34:12
10	Jeanette Nordgren	Sweden (SWE)	34:13
11	Jeanne Lasee	United States (USA)	34:23
12	Joan Nesbit	United States (USA)	34:36
13	Ana Isabel Alonso	Spain (ESP)	34:38
14	Alba Milana	Italy (ITA)	34:53
15	Pilar Fernandez	Spain (ESP)	35:06
16	Deirdre Nagle	Ireland (IRL)	35:06
17	Sylvie Bornet	France (FRA)	35:08
18	Rosanna Munerotto	Italy (ITA)	35:12
19	Michele Bush	United States (USA)	35:13
20	Magda Ilands	Belgium (BEL)	35:14
21	Maria Curatolo	Italy (ITA)	35:14
22	Ellen Wessinghage	West Germany (FRG)	35:15
23	Montserrat Abello	Spain (ESP)	35:41
24	Emma Scaunich	Italy (ITA)	35:56
25	Regina Chemeli	Kenya (KEN)	35:56
26	Jocelyne Villeton	France (FRA)	35:57
27	?		
28	Anne-Marie Cienka	France (FRA)	36:07
29	Conceição Ferreira	Portugal (POR)	36:11
30	?		
31	Christina Mai	West Germany (FRG)	36:16
32	El-Hassania Darami	Morocco (MAR)	36:27
33	Anni Müller	Austria (AUT)	36:28
34	Denise Verhaert	Belgium (BEL)	36:33
35	?		
36	Zita Agoston	Hungary (HUN)	36:40
37	?		
38	?		
39	Jutta Zimmerman	Austria (AUT)	37:01
40	?		
41	Emily Dowling	Ireland (IRL)	37:19
42	Wendy Hancock	New Zealand (NZL)	37:23
43	Ursula Noctor	Ireland (IRL)	37:24
44	Margrit Isenegger	Switzerland (SUI)	37:49
45	Elizabeth Franzis	West Germany (FRG)	38:08
46	?		
47	?		
48	Mariana Chirila	Romania (ROM)	38:28
49	Stella-Maris Selles	Argentina (ARG)	38:50
50	?		
51	Priscilla Chemeli	Kenya (KEN)	39:26

=== Team ===
Rank	Team	Points
1st place, gold medalist(s)	Great Britain (GBR); Carole Bradford; Debbie Peel; Carol Greenwood	1:41:24
2nd place, silver medalist(s)	Portugal (POR); Aurora Cunha; Rosa Mota; Conceição Ferreira	1:42:33
3rd place, bronze medalist(s)	United States (USA); Gail Kingma; Jeanne Lasee; Joan Nesbit	1:43:11
4	Italy (ITA); Alba Milana; Rosanna Munerotto; Maria Curatolo	1:45:19
5	Spain (ESP); Ana Isabel Alonso; Pilar Fernandez; Montserrat Abello	1:45:25
6	Ireland (IRL); Monica Joyce; Deirdre Nagle; Emily Dowling	1:46:34
7	France (FRA); Sylvie Bornet; Jocelyne Villeton; Anne-Marie Cienka	1:47:12
8	West Germany (FRG); Ellen Wessinghage; Christina Mai; Elizabeth Franzis	1:49:39
