= Andrea Wallace =

British long-distance runner

Personal information
- Nationality: British (English)
- Born: 22 November 1966 (age 59) Northallerton, Yorkshire, England

Sport
- Sport: Athletics
- Event: long-distance
- Club: Torbay AC
Medal record
Representing Great Britain
Athletics
World Women's Road Race Championships
Silver medal – second place	1991 Nieuwegein	15 km

Andrea Wallace (born 22 November 1966) is an English former long-distance runner who represented Great Britain in the 10,000 metres at the 1992 Olympic Games in Barcelona. She also won a silver medal over 15 km at the 1991 IAAF World Women's Road Race Championships in Nieuwegein.

== Biography ==
Wallace was born in Northallerton, Yorkshire, England, and was a member of Torbay Athletics Club. She emerged as one of the UK's leading distance runners in 1990, winning the UK World Cross-Country trial in Glasgow, before going on to win the UK National 3000 metres title and the AAA Championships National 10,000 metres title on the track.

Having missed the 1990 World Cross Country Championships through injury and then declined selection for the 1990 European Championships, Wallace's first major championships was the 1990 IAAF 15 km World Road Race Championships in Dublin, where she finished a fine fourth, just one second away from a medal. The following year she placed 27th at the 1991 World Cross Country Championships. Then at the 15 km World Road Race Championships in Nieuwegein, she won the silver medal in a best time of 48:43, narrowly losing out to Iulia Negura of Romania but finishing ahead of Uta Pippig of Germany.

In the spring of 1992, Wallace finished third at the London Marathon in 2:31:33. In the summer, she won her second AAAs 10,000 metres title in 32:21.61, to earn Olympic selection. At the Barcelona Olympics however, she struggled, managing to run only 34:29 in her heat, failing to reach the final.

In 1993, Wallace achieved her lifetime best half-marathon performance, running 69:39 in Bath. In 1994, she finished second at the Great North Run Half-Marathon behind Rosanna Munerotto of Italy, having previously finished second in 1991, behind Ingrid Kristiansen.

At her best on the roads, as of 2018, Wallace still ranks in the UK all-time top ten lists for the 15 km and half-marathon. Her 15 km best of 48:43 (Nieuwegein 1991) ranks her sixth and her half-marathon best of 69:39 (Bath 1993) ranks her seventh. Her 10 km road best of 31:56 (Stoke 1991) ranks her 11th.

== Achievements ==
- AAAs National 10,000 metres Champion (1990, 1992)
- UK National 3000 metres Champion (1990)

Year	Competition	Venue	Position	Event	Notes
1990	World Women's Road Race Championships	Dublin, Ireland	4th	15 km	50:20
1991	World Cross Country Championships	Antwerp, Belgium	27th	6.4 km	21:17
1991	Italian Marathon	Carpi, Italy	7th	Marathon	2:31.36
1991	World Women's Road Race Championships	Nieuwegein, Norway	2nd	15 km	48:43
1992	London Marathon	London, England	3rd	Marathon	2:31:32
1992	Olympic Games	Barcelona, Spain	heats	10,000 metres	34:29.47
1992	World Half Marathon Championships	Newcastle, England	12th	Half-Marathon	71:21

Note: At the 1992 World Half Marathon Championships, Wallace won a team silver medal, along with Liz McColgan and Suzanne Rigg.
