= 1982 European Athletics Indoor Championships – Women's 3000 metres =

The women's 3000 metres event at the 1982 European Athletics Indoor Championships was held on 6 March. This was the first time that this event was contested at the European Athletics Indoor Championships.

== Results ==
Rank	Name	Nationality	Time	Notes
1st place, gold medalist(s)	Agnese Possamai	Italy	8:53.77	CR, NR
2nd place, silver medalist(s)	Maricica Puică	Romania	8:54.26	NR
3rd place, bronze medalist(s)	Paula Fudge	Great Britain	8:56.96	
4	Vera Michallek	West Germany	9:03.27	
5	Nadia Dandolo	Italy	9:03.59	
6	Margherita Gargano	Italy	9:03.62	
7	Natalya Boborova	Soviet Union	9:09.80	
8	Aurora Cunha	Portugal	9:12.86	
9	Gudrun Schulz	West Germany	9:36.48	
