= Dornhoefer =

Dornhoefer, Dornhöfer is a German surname. Notable people with the surname include:

- Gary Dornhoefer (born 1943), Canadian ice hockey player
- Sabrina Dornhoefer (born 1963), American long-distance runner
