= Fabiola Paoletti =

Italian long-distance runner

Personal information
- National team: Italy (1 cap in 1986)
- Born: 1 June 1966 (age 60) Falerone, Italy

Sport
- Country: Italy
- Sport: Athletics
- Event: Long-distance running

Achievements and titles
- Personal best: Half marathon: 1:16:52 (1988)

Fabiola Paoletti (born 1 June 1966) is a former Italian female long-distance runner who competed at individual senior level at the IAAF World Women's Road Race Championships.

== Biography ==
Paoletti won Rome Marathon in 1988. She finished 5th at the 1991 Summer Universiade – Women's marathon held in Sheffield.
