= Athletics at the 1991 Pan American Games – Women's 3000 metres =

Women's 3000 metres at the Pan American Games

The women's 3000 metres event at the 1991 Pan American Games was held in Havana, Cuba on 4 August.

== Results ==
Rank	Name	Nationality	Time	Notes
1st place, gold medalist(s)	Sabrina Dornhoefer	United States	9:16.15	
2nd place, silver medalist(s)	María del Carmen Díaz	Mexico	9:19.05	
3rd place, bronze medalist(s)	Carmen Furtado	Brazil	9:19.18	
4	Lisa Harvey	Canada	9:19.58	
5	María Luisa Servín	Mexico	9:20.26	
6	Sarah Howell	Canada	9:22.50	
7	Milagro Rodríguez	Cuba	9:26.55	
8	Sammie Gdowski	United States	9:31.64	
9	Carmen Arrúa	Argentina	9:35.03	
10	Sandra Cortez	Bolivia	9:50.95	
11	Yesenia Centeno	Cuba	9:56.76	
12	Bigna Samuel	Saint Vincent and the Grenadines	9:57.53	
13	Anna Eatherley	Bermuda	10:12.73	
