= Adriana Barbu =

Romanian long-distance runner

Medal record

Women's athletics

Representing Romania

European Championships
Bronze medal – third place	1994 Helsinki	Marathon

Adriana Barbu (born Adriana Mustata, 17 January 1961) is a retired female long-distance runner from Romania, who specialized in the marathon race.

Barbu is best known for winning the bronze medal in the classic distance at the 1994 European Championships in Helsinki, clocking 2:30.55. She also triumphed in the 1987 edition of the Amsterdam Marathon on 10 May 1987, in 2:36.21.

She also won the 1995 Paris Half Marathon.

== Achievements ==
Year	Competition	Venue	Position	Event	Notes
Representing Romania
1987	Amsterdam Marathon	Amsterdam, Netherlands	1st	Marathon	2:36:21
1994	European Championships	Helsinki, Finland	3rd	Marathon	2:30:55
1995	Paris Half Marathon	Paris, France	1st	Half marathon	1:11:51
1998	European Championships	Budapest, Hungary	26th	Marathon	2:37:58
