= Malin Wästlund =

Swedish long-distance runner

Personal information
- Full name: Malin Charlotta Wästlund
- Born: 27 April 1964 (age 62)

Sport
- Country: Sweden
- Sport: Athletics
- Event(s): 15K run, half marathon
- Club: IF Spexarna

Achievements and titles
- Personal bests: 15K: 49:21 (1987) NR

Malin Charlotta Wästlund (born 27 April 1964) is a Swedish former long-distance runner. She represented Sweden twice at the IAAF World Women's Road Race Championships, placing fourth in 1987 with a Swedish national record of 49:21 minutes for the 15K run and placing fifth at the 1988 race. She also competed at the 1988 IAAF World Cross Country Championships, finished fifteenth in the women's senior race.

Born in Högsbo, near Gothenburg, she competed for IF Spexarna during her career. She won one national title in her career at the 1987 Swedish Half Marathon Championships. She was also runner-up at the Swedish Cross Country Championships that year. In Swedish cross country competitions, she won the 1987 Tjejmilen and was runner-up there and at the Lidingöloppet in 1989.

== International competitions ==
Year	Competition	Venue	Position	Event	Notes
1987	World Women's Road Race Championships	Monte Carlo, Monaco	4th	15K	49:21 NR
1988	World Cross Country Championships	Auckland, New Zealand	15th	Senior race	19:55
1988	World Women's Road Race Championships	Adelaide, Australia	5th	15K	50:42

== National titles ==
- Swedish Athletics Championships
  - Half marathon: 1987
