= Athletics at the 1989 Summer Universiade – Women's marathon =

The women's marathon event at the 1989 Summer Universiade was held in Duisburg on 26 August 1989.

== Results ==
Rank	Athlete	Nationality	Time	Notes
1st place, gold medalist(s)	Irina Bogacheva	Soviet Union	2:35:09	GR
2nd place, silver medalist(s)	Akemi Takayama	Japan	2:39:58	
3rd place, bronze medalist(s)	Kim Yen-ku	South Korea	2:40:52	
4	Tomoko Tanaka	Japan	2:41:05	
5	Alessandra Olivari	Italy	2:44:47	
6	Natalya Bardina	Soviet Union	2:46:27	
7	Anita Johnson	United States	2:50:31	
8	Judit Földing-Nagy	Hungary	2:50:44	
9	Valentina Ivanova	Soviet Union	2:52:11	
10	Asha Aggarwal	India	2:54:21	
11	Karin Rayle	United States	2:56:50	
12	Sangita Yashawant Satpute	India	3:04:26	
