= Francie Larrieu Smith =

American middle and long-distance runner

Frances Anne "Francie" Larrieu Smith (born November 23, 1952) is an American track and field athlete. She was the flagbearer at the 1992 Summer Olympics in Barcelona for the United States of America. Larrieu Smith was the third female American athlete to make five American Olympic teams, behind the six of fencer Jan York-Romary and Track and Field's Willye White. The feat was later equaled by basketball player Teresa Edwards, track and field's Gail Devers, cyclist/speedskater Chris Witty and swimmer Dara Torres. After one of the longest elite careers on record, she retired from that level of competition.

She won a World Road Race Championships silver medal at 15 km in 1990. Larrieu Smith is also a former world indoor record holder at the mile. She holds the Texas Relays Women's Invitational Record for both the 1,500 meters and 10,000 meters, set in 1983 and 1991, respectively.

From 1999 to 2019, Larrieu Smith was a cross country and track coach at Southwestern University in Georgetown, Texas.

== Early life and career ==
Smith was born in Palo Alto, California, the younger sister of the American Olympic distance runner Ron Larrieu. She started running at age 13 and ran for the San Jose Cindergals, one of the first youth track clubs for women. She attended Fremont High School in Sunnyvale, California, graduating in 1970 before any school in California had a women's track team. She attended California State University, Long Beach, and UCLA. Starting with the 1500 meter title in 1970 at age 17, Larrieu won 21 National Championships and set 13 world indoor records and 35 American records in her career. At the U.S./USSR indoor meet in 1975, she ran 4:28.5 for the mile run, indoors, which bested the standing outdoor World Record. Her still standing 1974 meet record in the mile at the Mt. SAC Relays has stood for over 40 years.

Smith has a master's degree in sports administration from the University of Texas. She married Jimmy Smith, a professor of kinesiology, in 1980. They were divorced in 2013.

== Longevity ==
Larrieu Smith had one of the lengthiest distance running careers, beginning with the 1972 Olympics as a 19-year-old running the 1500 metres, then the longest distance race for women, and again in the 1976 Olympics. She also qualified for the 1980 Summer Olympics but did not participate because of the 1980 Summer Olympics boycott. Her best performance was when she finished 5th in the Women's 10,000 metres in 1988 Summer Olympics in Seoul. Her final appearance was finishing 12th in the marathon in the 1992 Summer Olympics in Barcelona where, as the elder stateswoman of American track and field at age 39, she was selected to be the flagbearer in the opening ceremonies. She was the youngest female 1500 meter runner the U.S. has ever sent to the Olympics and the oldest female in any track and field event.

She was elected into the National Track and Field Hall of Fame in 1998. She was inducted into the National Distance Running Hall of Fame in 1999. Runner's World magazine named her "The Most Versatile runner of the Quarter Century". Smith was Inducted into the Texas Track and Field Coaches Association Hall of Fame, Class of 2017.

== Achievements ==
- 6-Times US 1500 m Champion (1972, 1973, 1976, 1977, 1979 & 1980)
- Recipient of one of 461 Congressional Gold Medals created especially for athletes who were prevented from competing in the 1980 Summer Games.
- 2-Time US 3000 m Champion (1979, 1982)
- US 10,000 m Champion (1985) – also won the 1985 US 10 km road title (tied with Betty Springs)
- 4 Times US Indoor 1 mile Champion (1975, 1977, 1978, 1979)
- 2 Time US Indoor 2 mile Champion (1977, 1981)
- Qualified for 5 US Olympic teams (1972, 1976, 1980, 1988, 1992) prevented from competing in 1980, due to the Olympic boycott by the U.S.
- Inducted into the Texas Track and Field Coaches Association Hall of Fame, Class of 2017

Year	Competition	Venue	Position	Event	Notes
Representing the United States
1972	Olympic Games	Munich, Germany	semi-final	1500 m	4:15.26
1976	Olympic Games	Montreal, Canada	semi-final	1500 m	4:09.07
1977	IAAF World Cup	Düsseldorf, Germany	2nd	1500 m	4:13.0
1979	IAAF World Cup	Montreal, Canada	3rd	1500 m	4:09.16
1979	IAAF World Cup	Montreal, Canada	3rd	3000 m	8:53.02
1986	Houston Marathon	Houston, United States	2nd	Marathon	2:33:37
1987	World Championships	Rome, Italy	15th	10,000 m	32:30.00
1988	Olympic Games	Seoul, South Korea	5th	10,000 m	31:35.52
1990	London Marathon	London, United Kingdom	2nd	Marathon	2:28:01
1990	World Women's Road Race Championships	Dublin, Ireland	2nd	15 km	50:15
1992	Houston Marathon / US Women's Olympic Trial	Houston, United States	3rd	Marathon	2:30:39
1992	Olympic Games	Barcelona, Spain	12th	Marathon	2:41:09

Olympic Games
Preceded by Bill Koch	Flagbearer for the United States; Barcelona 1992	Succeeded by Cammy Myler
