= 1994 European Athletics Championships – Women's marathon =

Women's marathon at the European Athletics Championships

These are the official results of the Women's marathon event at the 1994 European Championships in Helsinki, Finland. The race was held on 7 August 1994.

== Medalists ==
| Gold | Manuela Machado; Portugal (POR) |
| Silver | Maria Curatolo; Italy (ITA) |
| Bronze | Adriana Barbu; Romania (ROM) |

== Abbreviations ==
- All times shown are in hours:minutes:seconds

| DNS | did not start |
| NM | no mark |
| WR | world record |
| AR | area record |
| NR | national record |
| PB | personal best |
| SB | season best |

== Final ranking ==
| Rank | Athlete | Time | Note |
|---|---|---|---|
| 1st place, gold medalist(s) | Manuela Machado (POR) | 2:29:54 | |
| 2nd place, silver medalist(s) | Maria Curatolo (ITA) | 2:30:33 | |
| 3rd place, bronze medalist(s) | Adriana Barbu (ROM) | 2:30:55 | |
| 4 | Ornella Ferrara (ITA) | 2:31:57 | |
| 5 | Anuța Cătună (ROM) | 2:32:51 | |
| 6 | Ritva Lemettinen (FIN) | 2:33:05 | |
| 7 | Kirsi Rauta (FIN) | 2:33:32 | |
| 8 | Rosanna Munerotto (ITA) | 2:34:32 | |
| 9 | Anna Villani (ITA) | 2:34:46 | |
| 10 | Lidia Șimon (ROM) | 2:36:14 | |
| 11 | Danielle Sanderson (GBR) | 2:36:29 | |
| 12 | Firiya Sultanova (RUS) | 2:36:50 | |
| 13 | Judit Nagy (HUN) | 2:37:22 | |
| 14 | Ana Isabel Alonso (ESP) | 2:37:36 | |
| 15 | Marie-Hélène Ohier (FRA) | 2:37:38 | |
| 16 | Maryse Le Gallo (FRA) | 2:38:26 | |
| 17 | Elisabeth Krieg-Ruprecht (SUI) | 2:38:27 | |
| 18 | Isabelle Guillot (FRA) | 2:40:20 | |
| 19 | Marjan Freriks (NED) | 2:40:21 | |
| 20 | Izabela Zatorska (POL) | 2:40:31 | |
| 21 | Bettina Sabatini (ITA) | 2:40:32 | |
| 22 | Marian Sutton (GBR) | 2:40:34 | |
| 23 | Anna Rybicka (POL) | 2:40:47 | |
| 24 | Cristina Pomacu (ROM) | 2:40:48 | |
| 25 | Ramilya Burangulova (RUS) | 2:41:15 | |
| 26 | Jane Salumäe (EST) | 2:42:02 | |
| 27 | Lidia Camberg (POL) | 2:42:11 | |
| 28 | Marzanna Helbik (POL) | 2:42:14 | |
| 29 | Rosario Murcia (FRA) | 2:43:15 | |
| 30 | Lesley Turner (GBR) | 2:45:16 | |
| 31 | Alison Rose (GBR) | 2:45:19 | |
| 32 | Linda Rushmere (GBR) | 2:45:24 | |
| 33 | Pia Ruotsalainen (FIN) | 2:45:58 | |
| 34 | Françoise Bonnet (FRA) | 2:49:00 | |
| 35 | Teresa Dyer (GBR) | 2:50:23 | |
| 36 | Olga Michurina (RUS) | 2:51:05 | |
| 37 | Vera Sukhova (RUS) | 2:51:09 | |
| 38 | Satu Levelä (FIN) | 2:51:23 | |
| 39 | Siiri Kangur (EST) | 2:54:36 | |
DID NOT FINISH (DNF)
| — | Tatyana Ivanova (RUS) | DNF | |
| — | Rocío Ríos (ESP) | DNF | |
| — | Anne Jääskeläinen (FIN) | DNF | |
| — | Helena Javornik (SLO) | DNF | |
| — | Lyubov Klochko (UKR) | DNF | |
| — | Laura Fogli (ITA) | DNF | |
| — | Larisa Ziusko (RUS) | DNF | |
| — | Katrin Dörre (GER) | DNF | |
| — | María Luisa Muñoz (ESP) | DNF | |
| — | Ann-Catrin Nordman (FIN) | DNF | |
| — | Josefa Cruz (ESP) | DNF | |
| — | Aniela Nikiel (POL) | DNF | |

== Participation ==
According to an unofficial count, 51 athletes from 16 countries participated in the event.

- Estonia (2)
- Finland (6)
- France (5)
- Germany (1)
- Hungary (1)
- Italy (6)
- Netherlands (1)
- Poland (5)
- Portugal (1)
- Romania (4)
- Russia (6)
- Slovenia (1)
- Spain (4)
- Switzerland (1)
- Ukraine (1)
- United Kingdom (6)

== See also ==
- 1992 Men's Olympic Marathon (Barcelona)
- 1994 European Marathon Cup
