= Lesley Morton =

New Zealand long-distance runner

Personal information
- Full name: Lesley Margaret Morton
- Nationality: New Zealand
- Born: 25 December 1963 (age 62) Croydon, England
- Height: 161 cm (5 ft 3 1/2 in)
- Weight: 44 kg (97 lb)

Sport
- Sport: Long-distance running
- Event: 10,000 metres

Lesley Margaret Morton (born 25 December 1963) is a New Zealand long-distance runner. She competed in the women's 10,000 metres at the 1992 Summer Olympics. She was born in Croydon, England.

== International competitions ==
Year	Competition	Venue	Position	Event	Notes
1986	World Road Race Championships	Lisbon, Portugal	49th	15 km	53:29
1988	World Road Race Championships	Adelaide, Australia	53rd	15 km	55:16
1989	World Cross Country Championships	Stavanger, Norway	48th	6 km	24:09
1990	World Road Race Championships	Dublin, Ireland	42nd	15 km	53:14
1991	World Cross Country Championships	Antwerp, Belgium	109th	6.43 km	22:54
1991	World Championships	Tokyo, Japan	42nd (h)	10,000 m	33:23.17
1992	World Cross Country Championships	Boston, United States	53rd	6.38 km	22:33
1992	Olympic Games	Barcelona, Spain	33rd (h)	10,000 m	33:51.06
1993	World Cross Country Championships	Amorebieta, Spain	65th	6.35 km	21:23
1993	World Championships	Stuttgart, Germany	33rd (h)	10,000 m	33:54.39
1997	World Cross Country Championships	Turin, Italy	99th	6.6 km	23:12
(h) Indicates overall position in qualifying heats
