= Athletics at the 1991 Summer Universiade – Women's marathon =

The women's marathon event at the 1991 Summer Universiade was held at the streets of Sheffield on 21 July 1991.

== Results ==
Rank	Athlete	Nationality	Time	Notes
1st place, gold medalist(s)	Miyako Iwai	Japan	2:36:27	
2nd place, silver medalist(s)	Kim Yen-ku	South Korea	2:37:58	
3rd place, bronze medalist(s)	Mariya Doskoch	Soviet Union	2:38:48	
4	Chung Mi-ja	South Korea	2:43:00	
5	Fabiola Paoletti	Italy	2:53:28	
6	Theresa Padilla	United States	3:04:59	
7	Cher Patterson	United States	3:31:43	
