= Laura Faccio =

Italian middle-distance runner

Personal information
- National team: Italy (5 caps 1987-1991)
- Born: 27 April 1959 (age 67) Albizzate, Italy

Sport
- Country: Italy
- Sport: Athletics
- Events: Middle-distance running; Cross country running

Achievements and titles
- Personal best: 3000: 9:37.26 (1988)

Laura Faccio (born 27 April 1959) is a former Italian female middle-distance runner and cross-country runner who competed at individual senior level at the World Athletics Cross Country Championships (1987, 1989, 1990, 1991).
