= Judi St. Hilaire =

American runner

Judi St. Hilaire (born September 5, 1959) is an American former middle and long-distance runner. She won a silver medal at the 1985 World 15 km Road Race Championships and finished eighth in the 10,000 meters final at the 1992 Barcelona Olympics. She won the 1980 U.S. 10,000m title and the 1983 U.S. 5000m title.

St. Hilaire competed in the AIAW for the Vermont Catamounts track and field team, finishing 5th in the 3000 m at the 1979 AIAW Outdoor Track and Field Championships.

== International competitions ==
Year	Competition	Venue	Position	Event	Notes
Representing United States
1984	New York City Marathon	New York, United States	5th	Marathon	2:37:49
1985	World 15km Road Race Championships	Gateshead, United Kingdom	2nd	15 km	49:25
1991	World Championships	Tokyo, Japan	7th	3000m	8:42.64
1992	Olympic Games	Barcelona, Spain	8th	10,000m	31:38.04
