= Stefania Colombo =

Italian long-distance runner

Personal information
- National team: Italy (3 caps in 1985-1988)
- Born: 30 March 1957 (age 69) Milan, Italy

Sport
- Country: Italy
- Sport: Athletics
- Events: Long-distance running; Cross country running

Achievements and titles
- Personal best: Half marathon: 1:14:45 (1990)

Stefania Colombo (born 30 March 1957) is a former Italian female long-distance runner who competed at individual senior level at the IAAF World Women's Road Race Championships and at the IAAF World Cross Country Championships (1988).
