= Carole Bradford =

English long-distance runner

Personal information
- Nationality: British (English)
- Born: 30 November 1961 (age 63) Gloucestershire, England

Sport
- Sport: Athletics
- Event: long distance
- Club: Clevedon AC

Carole Bradford (born 30 November 1961) is an English retired middle and long-distance runner.

== Biography ==
Bradford finished third behind Kathryn Binns in the 5,000 metres event at the 1981 WAAA Championships, second behind Debbie Peel in the 3,000 metres event at the 1984 WAAA Championships and second behind Zola Budd at the 1985 WAAA Championships.

Bradford twice won the bronze medal at the IAAF World Women's Road Race Championships, in 1984 (10 km) and 1985 (15 km), as well as winning team gold in both years. She also won a team gold at the 1986 World Cross Country Championships and team silver at the 1984 World Cross Country Championships.

== International competitions ==
Year	Competition	Venue	Position	Event	Notes
Representing Great Britain / England
1980	World Cross Country Championships	Paris, France	82nd	4.82 km	17:42
1981	World Cross Country Championships	Madrid, Spain	45th	4.41 km	15:13
1983	World Road Race Championships	Madrid, Spain	3rd	10 km	33:25
1984	World Cross Country Championships	East Rutherford, United States	39th	5 km	16:52
1984	World Road Race Championships	Gateshead, United Kingdom	3rd	15 km	49:49
1986	World Cross Country Championships	Colombier, Switzerland	10th	4.65 km	15:27
