= Alessandra Olivari =

Italian long-distance runner

Personal information
- National team: Italy (2 caps 1987-1989)
- Born: 29 January 1964 (age 62) Santa Margherita Ligure, Italy

Sport
- Country: Italy
- Sport: Athletics
- Events: Long-distance running; Cross country running
- Club: CUS Genova

Achievements and titles
- Personal bests: Half marathon: 1:17:51 (1990); Marathon: 2:41:57 (1989)

Alessandra Olivari (born 29 November 1964) is a former Italian female long-distance runner and cross-country runner who competed at individual senior level at the World Athletics Cross Country Championships (1987).

She was 5th at the 1989 Summer Universiade – Women's marathon.
