= Joke Kleijweg =

Dutch long-distance runner

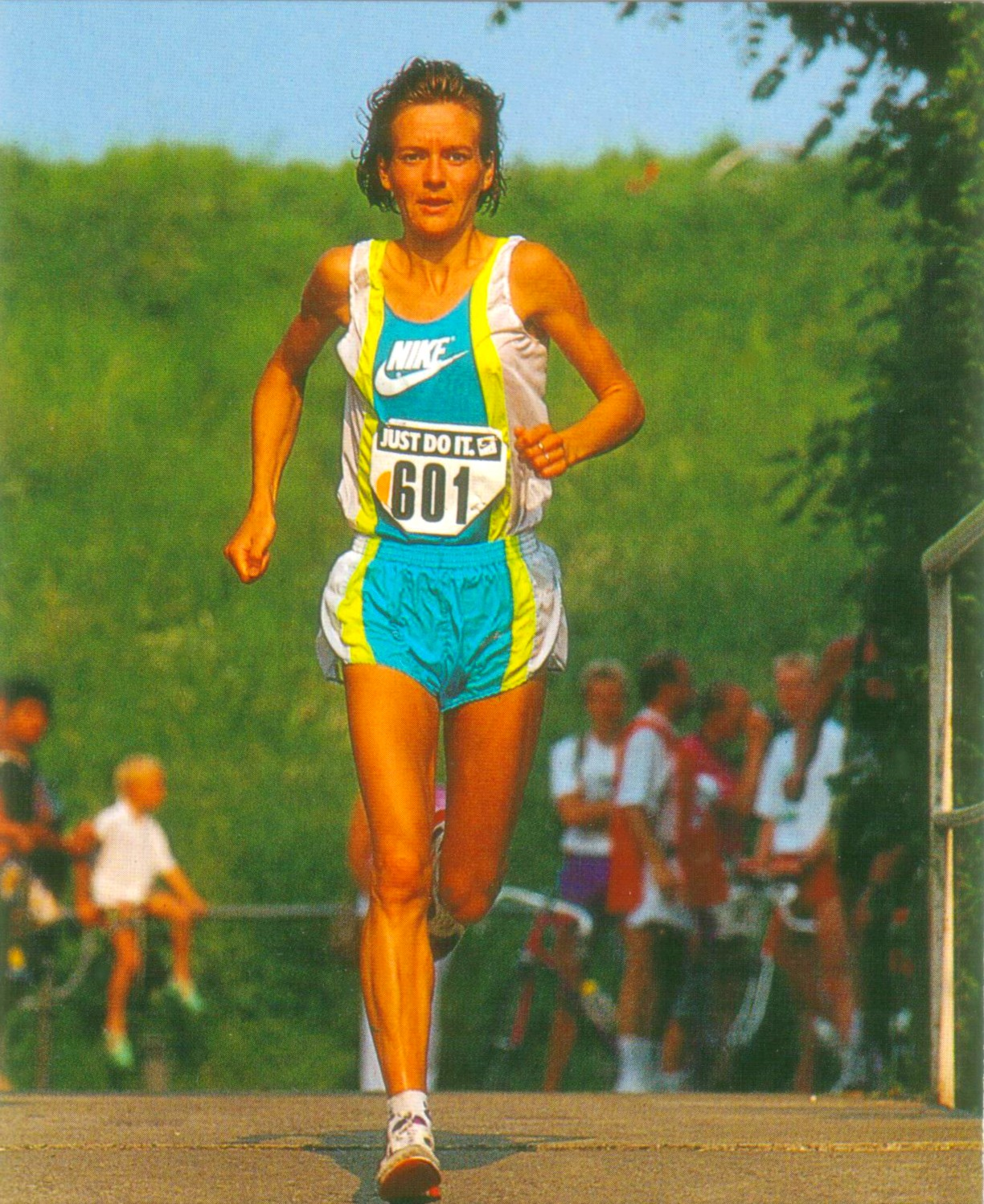
Joke Kleijweg during the NK 15 km in Grootebroek, 1991

Joke Kleijweg (born 9 January 1962, in Maasland) is a retired female long-distance runner from the Netherlands. She won the 1991 edition of the Rotterdam Marathon, clocking 2:34:18 on Sunday April 21, 1991. Later that year she competed at the World Championships in Tokyo, where she didn't finish the women's marathon race. Kleijweg won the Parelloop 10K in race in the Netherlands in 1991.

== Achievements ==
- All results regarding marathon, unless stated otherwise

Year	Competition	Venue	Position	Notes
Representing Netherlands
1990	Frankfurt Marathon	Frankfurt, Germany	3rd	2:38:36
1991	Rotterdam Marathon	Rotterdam, Netherlands	1st	2:34:18
1991	World Championships	Tokyo, Japan	—	DNF
