= Susan Wightman =

British long-distance runner (born 1960)

Susan Wightman née Tooby
Personal information
- Nationality: British
- Born: 24 October 1960 (age 65) Woolhope, England
- Height: 165 cm (5 ft 5 in)
- Weight: 49 kg (108 lb)

Sport
- Sport: Athletics
- Event: long distance
- Club: Cardiff AAC

Susan Julia Wightman (née Tooby; born 24 October 1960) is an English born long-distance runner who represented Great Britain and Wales. She set her personal best of 2:31:33 in the marathon, when finishing 12th at the 1988 Seoul Olympics.

== Biography ==
Born in Woolhope, Herefordshire, England, Tooby is the twin sister of 1988 World Cross Country silver medallist Angela Tooby.

Tooby finished third behind Debbie Peel in the 3,000 metres event at the 1983 WAAA Championships.

Tooby finished sixth in the 10,000 metres event at the 1986 Commonwealth Games, where in the same race her sister Angela won a bronze medal.

At the 1988 Great North Run, she became the first British woman to run a sub-70-minute half-marathon, running 69:46 to finish second behind Greta Waitz. This would stand as the UK record until 1991 when Liz McColgan ran 69:15.

In 1991, she married distance runner and marathoner Geoff Wightman, now a long-time media commentator on athletics. Susan competed under her married name of Wightman thereafter. They have three children, twin sons Jake (the winner of the 1500 metres at the 2022 World Athletics Championships) and Sam, and a daughter, Martha.

== International competitions ==
| Year | Competition | Venue | Position | Event | Notes |
Representing Great Britain / Wales
| 1985 | World Cross Country Championships | Lisbon, Portugal | 29th | 5 km | 16:04 |
| 1986 | World Cross Country Championships | Neuchâtel, Switzerland | 77th | 4.7 km | 16:08 |
| 1986 | Commonwealth Games | Edinburgh, United Kingdom | 6th | 10,000m | 32:56.78 |
| 1987 | World Cross Country Championships | Warsaw, Poland | 45th | 5.1 km | 17:54 |
| 1988 | World Cross Country Championships | Auckland, New Zealand | 16th | 6.0 km | 19:56 |
| 1988 | Olympic Games | Seoul, South Korea | 12th | Marathon | 2:31:33 |
| 1990 | European Championships | Split, SFR Yugoslavia | 20th | Marathon | 2:55:22 |
