= Suzanne Malaxos =

Australian long-distance runner

Personal information
- Nationality: Australian
- Born: 30 December 1961 (age 64) Denmark, Western Australia, Australia

Sport
- Sport: Long-distance running
- Event: Marathon

Suzanne Malaxos (born 30 December 1961) is an Australian former long-distance runner. She competed in the women's marathon at the 1996 Summer Olympics.
