= Lesley Lehane =

American long-distance runner

Lesley (Welch) Lehane
Personal information
- Born: 12 March 1963 (age 63) Lynn, Massachusetts
- Height: 5 ft 10 in (1.78 m)
- Weight: 120 lb (54 kg)

Sport
- Country: United States
- Event(s): Mile run, 5000 m, 10,000 m, Cross country
- College team: University of Virginia
- Coached by: Bruce Lehane
- Retired: 1999

Achievements and titles
- World finals: 1987 Cross Country 5th
- Personal best(s): 1500 m: 4:08.54 2000 m: 5:37.86; 3000 m: 8:44.05; 5000 m: 15:19.84 10000 m: 31:42.8

Lesley (Welch) Lehane (born March 12, 1963, in Lynn, MA) is an American retired long-distance runner.

== Early life ==
Lehane graduated from Peabody Veterans Memorial High School class of 1981, winning back to back to back cross country individual state titles from her sophomore through senior years. Her best times on the track in high school include a 9:27 3000 meter run and a 34:48 10,000 meter run.

== College and professional career ==
Lehane attended University of Virginia for two years, and subsequently transferred to Boston University. Her career highlights in cross country include winning both the NCAA and TAC National Championships in 1982, a 5th-place finish at the 1987 IAAF World Cross Country Championships, and a repeat as TAC National Championship winner in 1986. While at Virginia, she won the Broderick Award (now the Honda Sports Award) as the nation's top female collegiate cross country runner in 1982–83. Her career bests times are 4:08 1500 meters, 4:30 mile, 5:37 2000 meters, 8:44 3000 meters, 15:14 5000 meters on the road (15:19 on the track), 25:37 5 mile run, 31:42 10,000 meters, 53:04 10 mile run, and a 2-hour 32 minute marathon. Her identical twin sister Lisa Brady was also a competitive distance runner, who ran a 2-hour-34-minute marathon, placing sixth at the Boston Marathon.

== Achievements ==
- All results regarding marathon, unless stated otherwise

Year	Competition	Venue	Position	Notes
Representing the United States
1991	San Francisco Marathon	San Francisco, United States	1st	2:35:33
