= Nancy Tinari =

Canadian long-distance runner

Personal information
- Born: 13 June 1959 (age 67) Toronto, Canada

Sport
- Sport: Long distance running
Medal record
Representing Canada
Pan American Games
Silver medal – second place	1987 Indianapolis	10,000m
World Road Race Championships
Silver medal – second place	1983 San Diego	10 km Team
Silver medal – second place	1987 Monte Carlo	15 km Individual
World Cross Country Championships
Bronze medal – third place	1983 Gateshead	Women's Team

Nancy Tinari (née Rooks, born 13 June 1959) is a Canadian former long-distance runner. She won the silver medal at the 1987 World 15 km Road Race Championships behind Ingrid Kristiansen. Her time of 48:53 still stands as the Canadian record. She also won a silver medal at the 1987 Pan American Games, and represented Canada at the 1988 Seoul Olympics. Tinari continued competing into her forties, including finishing second at the 2000 Canadian 10 km Road Race Championships aged 41 and winning the Canadian Masters Cross Country title in November 2008 aged 49.

== Personal bests ==
- 10,000 metres – 32:14.05 (September 1988)
- 10 km road – 32:14 (April 1988)
- 15 km road – 48:53 (November 1987)
- Half-marathon – 72:50 (November 1991)
- Marathon – 2:40:50 (October 1983)

== International competitions ==
Year	Competition	Venue	Position	Event	Notes
Representing Canada
1978	World Cross Country Championships	Glasgow, United Kingdom	38th	4.73 km	18:06
1978	Commonwealth Games	Edmonton, Canada	5th	3000m	9:34.14
1980	World Cross Country Championships	Paris, France	17th	4.82 km	16:20
1982	World Cross Country Championships	Rome, Italy	38th	4.6 km	15:31
1983	World Cross Country Championships	Gateshead, United Kingdom	12th	4.07 km	14:09
1983	World 10 km Road Race Championships	San Diego, United States	4th	10 km	32:57
1984	World Cross Country Championships	East Rutherford, United States	33rd	5 km	16:50
1986	Commonwealth Games	Edinburgh, United Kingdom	4th	10,000m	32:30.71
1986	World 15 km Road Race Championships	Lisbon, Portugal	8th	15 km	49:22
1987	World Cross Country Championships	Warsaw, Poland	32nd	5.05 km	17:42
1987	Pan American Games	Indianapolis, United States	2nd	10,000m	33:02.41
1987	World Championships	Rome, Italy	16th	10,000m	32:31.55
1987	World 15 km Road Race Championships	Monte Carlo, Monaco	2nd	15 km	48:53
1988	World Cross Country Championships	Auckland, New Zealand	19th	5.96 km	19:57
1988	Olympic Games	Seoul, South Korea	13th	10,000m	32:14.05
