= Ailish Smyth =

Irish long-distance runner

Personal information
- Nationality: Irish
- Born: 18 September 1958 (age 67)

Sport
- Sport: Long-distance running
- Event: Marathon

Ailish Smyth (born 18 September 1958) is an Irish long-distance runner. She competed in the women's marathon at the 1988 Summer Olympics.
