= Sabrina Dornhoefer =

American long-distance runner

Personal information
- Born: December 2, 1963 (age 62) Fort Leonard Wood, Missouri, United States

Sport
- Sport: Track and field Cross country running
Medal record
Representing United States
Pan American Games
| Gold medal – first place | 1991 Havana | 3000m |

Sabrina Dornhoefer (born December 2, 1963) is a retired female middle-distance runner from the United States. She set her personal best (8:44.91) in the women's 3000 metres on 8 June 1988 at a meet in Victoria, British Columbia, Canada.

Competing for the Missouri Tigers track and field team, she won the 1985 NCAA Division I Outdoor Track and Field Championships in the 5000 metres.

== International competitions ==
| Year | Competition | Venue | Position | Event | Notes |
Representing the United States
| 1984 | World Cross Country Championships | East Rutherford, United States | 16th | Long Race Individual | |
| 1984 | World Cross Country Championships | East Rutherford, United States | 1st | Long Race Team | |
| 1991 | Pan American Games | Havana, Cuba | 1st | 3000 m | 9:16.15 |
