= Anna Villani =

Italian marathon runner

Personal information
- Nationality: Italian
- Born: 21 June 1966 (age 60) Salerno, Italy
- Height: 1.53 m (5 ft 0 in)
- Weight: 42 kg (93 lb)

Sport
- Country: Italy
- Sport: Athletics
- Event: Marathon
- Club: Fiat Sud Formia

Achievements and titles
- Personal best: Marathon: 2:31:06 (1991)
Medal record
World Marathon Cup
Silver medal – second place	1991 London	Team
European Marathon Cup
Gold medal – first place	1994 Helsinki	Team

Anna Villani (born 21 June 1966) is a retired female marathon runner from Italy.

== Biography ==
Villani was born in Salerno. She represented her native country at the 1992 Summer Olympics in Barcelona, Spain, where she ended up in 20th place in the women's marathon race. She set her personal best (2:31:06) in 1991.

== Achievements ==
Year	Competition	Venue	Position	Event	Notes
Representing Italy
1989	Italian Marathon	Carpi, Italy	1st	Marathon	2:35:05
1992	Olympic Games	Barcelona, Spain	20th	Marathon	2:46:44
1994	European Championships	Helsinki, Finland	9th	Marathon	2:34.46
1997	World Championships	Athens, Greece	27th	Marathon	2:43:58

== National titles ==
She has won 4 times the individual national championship.

- 4 wins in the half marathon (1985, 1991, 1992, 1993)
