= Paula Fudge =

British long-distance runner

Paula Fudge née Yeoman
Personal information
- Nationality: British (English)
- Born: 30 March 1952 (age 74) Ealing, London, England

Sport
- Sport: Athletics
- Event: middle-distance
- Club: Feltham Athletic Club
Medal record
Representing Great Britain
Women's Athletics
World 15km Road Race Championships
Gold medal – first place	1985 Gateshead	Team
Bronze medal – third place	1987 Monte Carlo	Team
European Indoor Championships
Bronze medal – third place	1982 Milan	3000 m
Representing England
World Cross Country Championships
Bronze medal – third place	1979 Limerick	Team
Bronze medal – third place	1982 Rome	Team
Commonwealth Games
Gold medal – first place	1978 Edmonton	3000 m

Paula Fudge (née Yeoman; born 30 March 1952) is an English former middle and long-distance runner.

== Biography ==
Yeoman and her twin sister Ann Yeoman were born in Ealing in 1952. Paula became the British 3000 metres champion after winning the British WAAA Championships title at the 1972 WAAA Championships. Paula and her sister Ann finished third and second respectively behind Joyce Smith in the 3000 metres at the 1974 WAAA Championships.

Paula Yeoman married in 1976 and competed under her married name of Fudge thereafter.

Fudge won a gold medal in the 3000 metres at the 1978 Commonwealth Games, and on 13 September 1981 she set the world record for the 5000 metres with 15.14.51, the first recognised women's 5000m world record by the IAAF. This record remained the British record until 1985 when it was broken by Zola Budd. She also won a bronze medal in the 3000 metres at the 1982 European Indoor Championships.

Fudge made her marathon debut at the 1985 Columbus Marathon, winning in a time of 2:35:10. She then won a team gold medal at the 1985 World 15km Road Race Championships, and finished fifth individually. She improved her marathon personal best to 2:32:25 at the 1986 London Marathon. After the withdrawals of her twin sister Ann and Priscilla Welch due to injury, and Veronique Marot declining selection, Fudge was selected to compete in the marathon at the 1988 Seoul Olympics, but she, too, turned the offer down. A month after the Olympics, she ran her best-ever marathon time, when finishing third at the Chicago Marathon in 2:29:47.

In 2003, Fudge broke the UK W50 record by running 79:39 at the Fleet Half Marathon. A record that stood until 2011. She became an athletics coach at her running club Windsor, Slough, Eton and Hounslow Athletic Club

== International competitions ==
Year	Competition	Venue	Position	Event	Notes
Representing Great Britain / England
1978	Commonwealth Games	Edmonton, Canada	1st	3000 m	9:12.95
1978	European Championships	Prague, Czechoslovakia	8th	3000 m	8:48.74
1979	World Cross Country Championships	Limerick, Ireland	17th	5.0 km	17:58
1981	World Cross Country Championships	Madrid, Spain	28th	4.4 km	15:02
1982	European Indoor Championships	Milan, Italy	3rd	3000 m	8:56.96
1982	World Cross Country Championships	Rome, Italy	14th	4.7 km	15:03
1985	World Cross Country Championships	Lisbon, Portugal	56th	5.0 km	16:22
1985	Columbus Marathon	Columbus, Ohio, United States	1st	Marathon	2:35:10
1985	World Road Race Championships	Gateshead, United Kingdom	5th	15 km	50:36
1986	London Marathon	London, England	5th	Marathon	2.32.25
1986	World Road Race Championships	Lisbon, Portugal	20th	15 km	50:51
1987	Reading Half Marathon	Reading, England	1st	Half marathon	1:12:45
1987	London Marathon	London, England	4th	Marathon	2:32:28
1987	Greifenseelauf	Canton of Zürich, Switzerland	1st	19.5 km	1:09:35
1987	World Championships	Rome, Italy	17th	Marathon	2:42:42
1987	World Road Race Championships	Monte Carlo, Monaco	8th	15 km	49:43
1988	Chicago Marathon	Chicago, United States	3rd	Marathon	2:29:47
