= Debbie Peel =

English middle-distance runner

Personal information
- Nationality: British (English)
- Born: 19 August 1958

Sport
- Sport: Athletics
- Event: middle distance
- Club: Crawley AC

Deborah Ann Peel (born 19 August 1958) is a female former athlete who competed for England.

== Biography ==
Peel, a data control clerk at the time, became the British 3,000 metres champion after winning the British WAAA Championships at the 1982 WAAA Championships. Shortly afterwards Peel represented England in the 3,000 metres, at the 1982 Commonwealth Games in Brisbane, Australia.

Peel retained the 3,000 metres title and finished third behind Gillian Green in the 1500 metres at the 1983 WAAA Championships and then won a third consecutive 3,000 WAAA title at the 1984 WAAA Championships.

Peel represented England again in the 3,000 metres event, at the 1986 Commonwealth Games in Edinburgh, Scotland.
