= Iulia Olteanu =

Romanian long-distance runner

Personal information
- Born: 26 January 1967 (age 59) Piatra Neamț, Romania

Sport
- Sport: Track and field
Medal record
Representing Romania
World Half Marathon Championships
Silver medal – second place	1994 Oslo	Half marathon
Summer Universiade
Gold medal – first place	1993 Buffalo	10,000 m
Gold medal – first place	1995 Fukuoka	10,000 m

Iulia Olteanu (née Negură; born 26 January 1967) is a Romanian former long-distance runner who competed in cross country, track and road running events.

She made her breakthrough on the international scene with consecutive wins at the IAAF World Women's Road Race Championships in 1990 and 1991. She helped Romania to a number of team medals at the IAAF World Half Marathon Championships and IAAF World Cross Country Championships, and also ran in the 10,000 metres at two editions of the IAAF World Championships in Athletics as well as the 1996 Summer Olympics.

Olteanu was the silver medallist at the 1994 IAAF World Half Marathon Championships, setting a lifetime best of 1:09:15. She was victorious at the 1996 European Cross Country Championships but was stripped of her title as she had failed a test for the steroid stanozolol and received a two-year competitive ban for doping. After her ban had expired, she was again selected for the Romanian cross country and half marathon teams, but failed to medal. She competed in her first marathon in 2002 but retired from international competition in 2003.

Among her other achievements are two consecutive 10,000 m titles at the Summer Universiade, as well as circuit wins at the Great South Run, Sapporo Half Marathon and the Chiba and Fukuoka Cross Country meetings.

== Career ==
=== Early career ===
Born Iulia Negură in Piatra Neamț, Romania, she made her debut at the IAAF World Cross Country Championships in 1987, coming in 50th place. She made her breakthrough three years later with a twelfth-place finish at the 1990 IAAF World Cross Country Championships, followed by a win at the IAAF World Women's Road Race Championships. She took a road win at the Foulées de Suresnes over 10 km in October. She made her global track debut at the 1991 World Championships in Athletics in Tokyo where she was 17th over 10,000 metres. She also managed three national titles over that distance in her career. She took a second world title over 15 km at the 1991 Women's Road Championships.

=== World and Olympic competition ===
In 1992 she reached the top twenty at the 1992 IAAF World Cross Country Championships and also ran at the newly inaugurated IAAF World Half Marathon Championships, where she was tenth overall. Among her appearances on the circuit that year was a win over 10 miles at the Great South Run in Portsmouth. She won the race for a second time the next year and improved upon her previous position at the 1993 IAAF World Half Marathon Championships, finishing the race in seventh to help Romania to the women's team title with Elena Murgoci and Anuța Cătună. She represented Romania in the 10,000 m at the 1993 World Championships in Athletics, coming sixteenth.

She was first at the 1994 Marseille-Cassis Classique Internationale and set a course record of 1:10:32. Olteanu ran a personal best of 1:09:15 for the half marathon event at the 1994 IAAF World Half Marathon Championships to take the silver medal behind Elana Meyer, as well as leading the Romanian women to a second consecutive team title. At the 20 Kilomètres de Paris in October she won in a time of 1:08:04. She was studying at university during this period and as a student she won the Summer Universiade titles in the 10,000 m in 1993 and 1995, as well a gold medal at the 1994 FISU Cross Country Championships.

She was 29th in the long race at the 1995 IAAF World Cross Country Championships, sharing in the team bronze medal, while her eleventh-place finish at the 1995 European Cross Country Championships brought Romania the team silver medals at that event. Olteanu ran at the 1995 IAAF World Half Marathon Championships but did not manage to finish the race on that occasion. At the beginning of 1996 she won the Chiba International Cross Country in Japan. She took twelfth place at the 1996 IAAF World Cross Country Championships, helping Romania to another team bronze, and made her Olympic debut on the track in August. Setting a career best mark of 31:26.46 minutes, she came eighth in the women's 10,000 m at the 1996 Atlanta Olympics.

=== Stripped title and doping ban ===
Olteanu ended the year with her first win at a major continental competition, taking the gold medal at the 1996 European Cross Country Championships. However, her performance did not stand as she had failed an out-of-competition drug test in early December, two weeks before the event. She received a four-year ban from competition for her use of stanozolol (a performance-enhancing steroid. Her ban came at a time when numerous Romanian athletes were punished for doping infractions, marking a determined effort by Iolanda Balaş, the president of the Romanian Athletics Federation (FRA), to clean up the national athletics scene. In spite of this, the FRA opted to give Olteanu a two-year ban for her failed test, superseding the longer four-year ban set in place by the International Association of Athletics Federations. She became eligible for competition again in December 1998.

=== Later career ===
She made her international return at the 1999 European Cross Country Championships and helped Romania to the team silver alongside Constantina Diţă. Her efforts were principally focused on cross country over this period: she won the Fukuoka International Cross Country in 2000 and ran in both the long and short races at the 2000 IAAF World Cross Country Championships, finishing 46th in the long race and 21st over the shorter distance. The following year she won both the Chiba and Fukuoka races in Japan at the beginning of 2001, going on to place fifteenth in the short race at the 2001 IAAF World Cross Country Championships. After taking the national title in the half marathon, she ran at that year's World Half Marathon Championships and came 22nd in the rankings. She also competed on the Japanese road circuit in 2001 and was third at both the Sapporo Half Marathon and Kyoto Half Marathon.

Olteanu decided to make a change up to the marathon distance in 2002 and she finished the Vienna City Marathon in a time of 2:40:14 hours, placing sixth. The 2003 season saw her final year of international competition: despite a win at the national half marathon championships, she failed to finish the race at the World Championships that year.

== Personal bests ==
- 5000 metres - 15:06.73 mins (1999)
- 10,000 metres - 31:26.46 mins (1996)
- Half marathon - 1:09:15 hrs (1994)
- Marathon - 2:40:14 hrs (2002)

All information from IAAF Profile

== See also ==
- List of doping cases in athletics
