= Albertina Machado =

Portuguese long-distance runner

Personal information
- Full name: Maria Albertina Pinto Machado
- Nationality: Portuguese
- Born: 25 December 1961 (age 64) Braga, Portugal

Sport
- Sport: Long-distance running
- Event: Marathon

Maria Albertina Pinto Machado (born 25 December 1961) is a Portuguese long-distance runner. She competed in the women's marathon at the 1996 Summer Olympics.

She is mother of Mariana Machado.
