= Tigist Moreda =

Ethiopian long-distance runner

Personal information
- Nationality: Ethiopian
- Born: 1968 (age 57–58)

Sport
- Sport: Long-distance running
- Event: 10,000 metres
Medal record
Women's athletics
Representing Ethiopia
African Championships
| Silver medal – second place | 1989 Lagos | 10,000 m |
| Bronze medal – third place | 1988 Annaba | 3000 m |
| Bronze medal – third place | 1990 Cairo | 10,000 m |

Tigist Moreda (born 1968) is an Ethiopian former long-distance runner. She competed in the women's 10,000 metres at the 1992 Summer Olympics.
