= Maryse Justin-Pyndiah =

Mauritian long-distance runner

Personal information
- Nationality: Mauritian
- Born: 25 August 1959
- Died: 25 September 1995 (aged 36)

Sport
- Sport: Long-distance running
- Event: Marathon

Maryse Justin-Pyndiah (25 August 1959 – 25 September 1995) was a Mauritian long-distance runner. She died of cancer.

== Family life ==
She was born as Maryse Justin and after marriage changed her name to Maryse Justin-Pyndiah.

She worked in a textile factory in Floréal. As part of her training regime she ran daily from her home in Quatre Bornes to her workplace.

== Achievements ==
At the 1985 Indian Ocean Island Games, Jeux des Îles de l'Océan Indien (JIOI) she came out first in the 3000m women's race event ahead of Albertine Rahéliarisoa and Jacqueline Razanadravao of Madagascar.

Maryse Justin-Pyndiah also competed in the women's marathon at the 1988 Summer Olympics, where she ranked 51st.

== Tribute ==
The Maryse Justin-Pyndiah Stadium, located in Réduit (Mauritius), is named after her.
