= Agnes Pardaens =

Belgian long-distance runner

Personal information
- Nationality: Belgian
- Born: 9 October 1956 (age 69)

Sport
- Sport: Long-distance running
- Event: Marathon

Agnes Pardaens (born 9 October 1956) is a Belgian long-distance runner. She competed in the women's marathon at the 1988 Summer Olympics.
