= Christina Mai =

German long-distance runner (born 1961)

Christina Angela Mai (born 3 September 1961) is a retired (West) German long-distance runner.

In the 1980s she finished lowly at the 1986 and the 1987 World Cross Country Championships. She later competed on the highest level in 3000 metres indoors. She finished fifth at the 1987 European Indoor Championships, was disqualified in the final round at the 1991 World Indoor Championships, finished fourth at the 1993 World Indoor Championships, sixth at the 1992 European Indoor Championships, and fourth at the 1994 European Indoor Championships. She later started, but did not finish, the 1997 World Half Marathon Championships.

Mai became German indoor champion in the 3000 metres in 1993 and 1994. She became West German half marathon champion in 1987, and won the club competition in this event from 1983 through 1991 except for 1988. She became national cross-country running champion in 1991 (long race) and 1994 (short race), and took several club titles here as well. She once won a club title in the marathon; in 1983. She represented the club LAV Dortmund/LG Olympia Dortmund. She also won individual silver and bronze medals in the 3000 and 10,000 metres.

His personal best times are 8:54.16 minutes in the 3000 metres, achieved in August 1991 in Menden; 15:47.73 minutes in the 5000 metres, achieved in May 1993 in Köln; 32:55.18 minutes in the 10,000 metres, achieved in June 1991 in Potsdam; and 2:36:20 hours in the marathon, achieved at the 1997 Frankfurt Marathon.
