= Maria Curatolo =

Italian long-distance runner

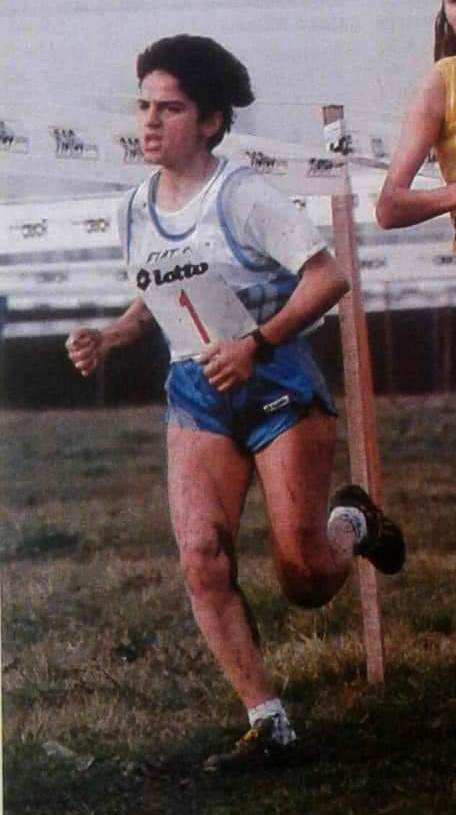
- Curatolo at the Italian Athletics Clubs Championships in Treviso in 1988.

Personal information
- National team: Italy: 24 caps (1984-1997)
- Born: 12 October 1963 (age 62) Turin, Italy
- Height: 1.47 m (4 ft 10 in)
- Weight: 39 kg (86 lb)

Sport
- Sport: Athletics
- Event: Long-distance running
- Club: Fiat Sud Formia

Achievements and titles
- Personal bests: 3000 m: 9:01.71 (1988); 5000 m: 16:04.91 (1988); 10,000 m: 32:04.34 (1986); Half marathon: 1:12:03 (1997); Marathon: 2:30:14 (1988)
Medal record
Women's athletics
Representing Italy
European Championships
Silver medal – second place	1994 Helsinki	Marathon

Maria Curatolo (born 12 October 1963) is a former Italian long-distance runner who specialized in the marathon race.

== Biography ==
She finished eighth at the 1988 Summer Olympics, tenth at the 1988 IAAF World Cross Country Championships and won the silver medal at the 1994 European Championships.

== Achievements ==
Year	Competition	Venue	Position	Event	Notes
Representing Italy
1986	European Championships	Stuttgart, West Germany	10th	10,000 m	32:04.34
1988	Olympic Games	Seoul, South Korea	8th	Marathon	2:30:14
1994	European Championships	Helsinki, Finland	2nd	Marathon	2:30.33
1994	European Championships	Helsinki, Finland	1st	Team	7:37:02
1996	Olympic Games	Atlanta, United States	—	Marathon	DNF

== National titles ==
Curatolo won nine national championships at individual senior level.

- Italian Athletics Championships
  - 10,000 m: 1985, 1987, 1988, 1989 (4)
  - Half marathon: 1986, 1988, 1995 (3)
- Italian Cross Country Championships
  - Long race: 1987, 1988 (2)

== See also ==
- Italian team at the running events
- Italian all-time top lists – 10000 metres
