= Aurora Cunha =

Portuguese long-distance runner

Personal information
- Born: 31 May 1959
- Height: 155 cm (5 ft 1 in)
- Weight: 58 kg (128 lb)

Sport
- Sport: Long-distance runner

Aurora Cunha (born 31 May 1959, in Ronfe, near Guimarães) is a retired long-distance runner from Portugal, living in Póvoa de Varzim. From 1984 to 1992 she represented her native country in three consecutive Olympic Games. Cunha's greatest successes were in road running, at which she was a three-time World Champion. She also won several marathons during her career, including Paris (1988), Tokyo (1988), Chicago (1990) and Rotterdam (1992).

== International competitions ==
Year	Competition	Venue	Position	Event	Notes
Representing Portugal
1982	European Indoor Championships	Milan, Italy	8th	3000 m	9:12.86
1983	Ibero-American Championships	Barcelona, Spain	1st	1500m	4:15.55
1983	Ibero-American Championships	Barcelona, Spain	1st	3000m	9:14.10
1984	World Road Race Championships	Madrid, Spain	1st	10 km	33:04
1984	Olympic Games	Los Angeles, United States	6th	3000 m	8:46.37
1985	World Road Race Championships	Gateshead, England	1st	15 km	49:17
1986	European Indoor Championships	Madrid, Spain	6th	3000 m	9:10.50
1986	European Championships	Stuttgart, West Germany	4th	10,000 m	31:39.35
1986	World Road Race Championships	Lisbon, Portugal	1st	15 km	48:31
1987	World Championships	Rome, Italy	17th	10,000 m	32:44.42
1988	Paris Marathon	Paris, France	1st	Marathon	2:34:56
1988	Olympic Games	Seoul, South Korea	—	Marathon	DNF
1988	Tokyo Marathon	Tokyo, Japan	1st	Marathon	2:31:26
1989	London Marathon	London, England	3rd	Marathon	2:28:11
1989	World Road Race Championships	San Diego, United States	3rd	15 km	50:06
1990	European Championships	Split, Yugoslavia	9th	10,000 m	32:15.83
1990	World Road Race Championships	Dublin, Ireland	5th	15 km	50:27
1990	Chicago Marathon	Chicago, United States	1st	Marathon	2:30:11
1991	World Championships	Tokyo, Japan	—	Marathon	DNF
1992	Rotterdam Marathon	Rotterdam, Netherlands	1st	Marathon	2:29:14
1992	Olympic Games	Barcelona, Spain	—	Marathon	DNF
