= Jocelyne Villeton =

French long-distance runner

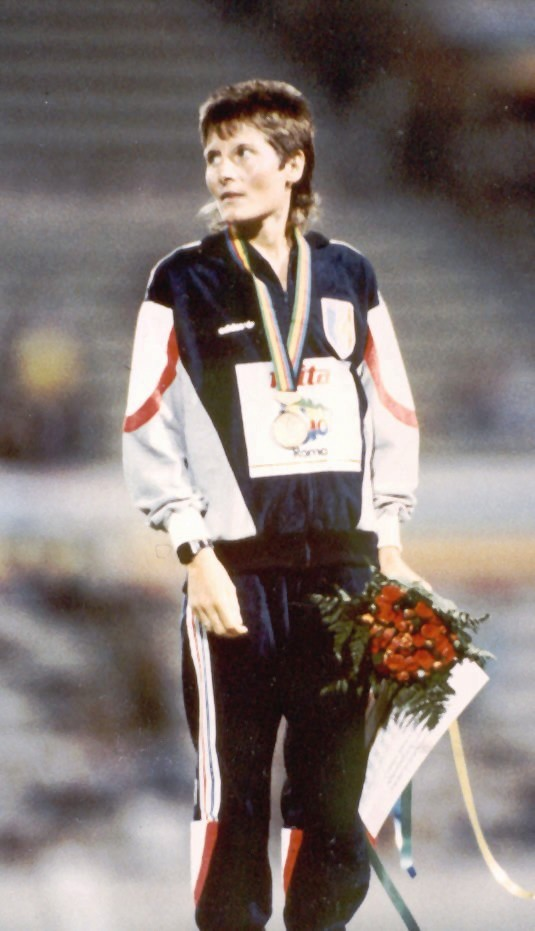
- Villeton in Rome in 1987

Personal information
- National team: France
- Born: 17 September 1954 (age 71) Vals-les-Bains, France

Sport
- Country: France
- Sport: Athletics
- Event: Long-distance running

Achievements and titles
- Personal bests: 10,000 m: 32:51.37 (1988); 15 km: 50:30 (1986); Half marathon: 1:14:31 (1987); 25 km: 1:25:54 (1987); Marathon: 2:32:03 (1987)
Medal record
Women's athletics
Representing France
World Championships
Bronze medal – third place	Rome 1987	Marathon

Jocelyne Villeton (French pronunciation: [ʒɔslin viltɔ̃]; born 17 September 1954) is a French retired long-distance runner who won the bronze medal in the marathon at the 1987 World Championships.

Jocelyne Villeton only occasionally practiced athletics in her teens in the 1970s.

Finding herself unemployed in the early 1980s, she decided to devote herself to distance running, driven by her husband. By 1984, she was French champion in the 10,000 meters and 25 kilometers on the road. In subsequent years, she gained new titles and performed strongly in the marathon.

In 1987, when she had to find employment in the municipality of Saint-Étienne, she surprised everyone by winning the very first French medal at the IAAF World Championships in Athletics with a third place in the marathon. Until 1991, she ran at the highest European level.

She now lives in Saint-Genest-Lerpt, and continues to run as a veteran. She is a Knight of the National Order of Merit in 2002 and a Knight of the Legion of Honour in 2008.

== French Championships ==
- 1984 : (gold) French Champion at 10 000 metres
- 1984 : (gold) French Champion at 25 kilometres on road
- 1985 : (silver) French Championships at 10 000 metres
- 1986 : (gold) French Champion at 10 000 metres, with new French record
- 1987 : (gold) French Champion at 10 000 metres
- 1988 : (silver) French Championships at 10 000 metres
- 1991 : (gold) French Champion at 25 kilometres on road
- 1991 : (bronze) French Champion at 10 000 metres
- 1995 : 5th at French Championships of the half-marathon

== International Performances ==
- 1984 : 25th at World Road Race 10 kilometres Championship
- 1985 : Selected to World Cross Country Championship
- 1985 : World Champion at 15 kilometres on road for 1985
- 1986 : 5th at 1986 European Marathon Championship
- 1987 : (bronze) 1987 World Championships for the marathon
- 1988 : 10th at World Championships for 15 kilometres on road
- 1988 : 19th at marathon of 1988 Olympic Games
- 1992 : selected to the World Championships for the semi-marathon
- 1984-1995 : 25 selections for French international teams
