= Kerstin Preßler =

German long-distance runner (born 1962)

Personal information
- Born: 2 February 1962 (age 64) Augsburg, West Germany

Sport
- Sport: Marathon running

Kerstin Marie-Luise Preßler (born 2 February 1962) is a former female long-distance runner from Germany, who represented West Germany at the 1988 Summer Olympics. She won the Tiberias Marathon in 1986, the 1987 edition of the Berlin Marathon and the 1990 Frankfurt Marathon. She also competed over the half marathon distance and twice won the Berlin Half Marathon (1985 and 1988).

== Achievements ==
Year	Competition	Venue	Position	Event	Notes
Representing West Germany
1986	European Championships	Stuttgart, West Germany	20th	10,000 m	33:03.63
1987	Berlin Marathon	Berlin, West Germany	1st	Marathon	2:31:22
1987	World Championships	Rome, Italy	10th	10,000 m	31:56.80
1988	Olympic Games	Seoul, South Korea	21st	Marathon	2:34:26
1990	Frankfurt Marathon	Frankfurt, Germany	1st	Marathon	2:34:13
1990	European Championships	Split, Yugoslavia	11th	10,000 m	32:42.96
