= Rosanna Munerotto =

Italian long-distance runner

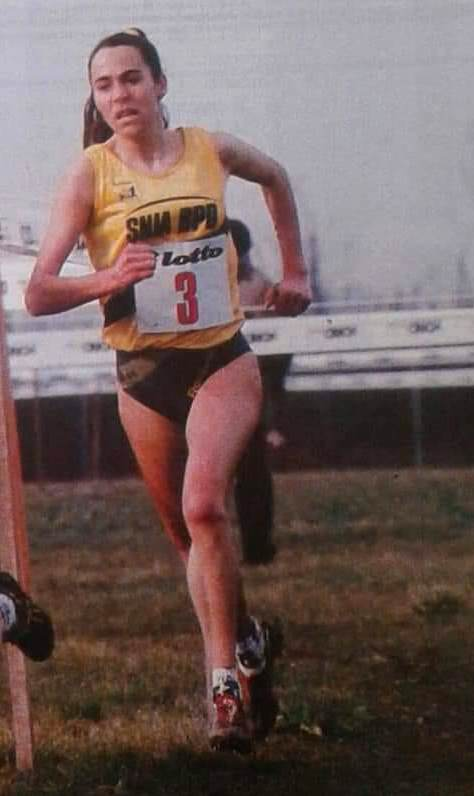
- Munerotto at the Italian Athletics Clubs Championships in Treviso in 1988.

Personal information
- Nationality: Italian
- Born: 3 December 1962 (age 63) San Lucia di Piave, Italy
- Height: 1.69 m (5 ft 6 1/2 in)
- Weight: 53 kg (117 lb)

Sport
- Country: Italy
- Sport: Athletics
- Event: Marathon
- Club: Snia Milano

Achievements and titles
- Personal bests: 3000 m: 8:53.00 (1991); 5000 m: 15:36.62 (1993); 10,000 m: 32:05.75 (1991); Half marathon: 1:09:38 (1992); Marathon: 2:29.31 (1995)
Medal record
World Half Marathon Championships
Bronze medal – third place	1992 Tyneside	Half marathon
Mediterranean Games
Silver medal – second place	1987 Latakia	3000 m
European Marathon Cup
Gold medal – first place	1994 Helsinki	Team marathon
International Marathons
Event / 1st / 2nd / 3rd; Italian Marathon / 1 / 0 / 0

Rosanna Munerotto (born 3 December 1962) is an Italian long-distance runner who specialized in the marathon race.

== Biography ==
She won three medals, at senior level, at the International athletics competitions. She participated at two editions of the Summer Olympics (1988, 1992). She has 24 caps in national team from 1984 to 1994. She was engaged to 1988 Olympic silver medallist, Salvatore Antibo.

== Achievements ==
Year	Competition	Venue	Position	Event	Notes
Representing Italy
1987	Mediterranean Games	Latakia, Syria	2nd	3000 m	9:08.54
1988	Olympic Games	Seoul, South Korea	14th	10,000 m	32:29.84
1991	World Championships	Tokyo, Japan	15th	10,000 m	32:05.75 PB
1992	World Half Marathon Championships	South Shields, England	3rd	Half marathon	1:09:38 PB
1992	Olympic Games	Barcelona, Spain	16th	10,000 m	32:37.91
1992	Italian Marathon	Carpi, Emilia-Romagna	1st	Marathon	2:29:34
1993	World Championships	Stuttgart, Germany	—	Marathon	DNF
1994	European Championships	Helsinki, Finland	8th	Marathon	2:34:32

== National titles ==
She has won one time the individual national championship.

- 1 win in the cross country running (1993)

== See also ==
- Italian all-time top lists - 10000 metres
- Italian all-time top lists - Half marathon
