= Lyudmila Matveyeva =

Russian long-distance runner

Personal information
- Full name: Lyudmila Mikhaylovna Matveyeva
- Nationality: Soviet
- Born: 1 February 1957 (age 68)

Sport
- Sport: Long-distance running
- Event: 10,000 metres

Lyudmila Mikhaylovna Matveyeva (born 1 February 1957) is a Soviet long-distance runner. She competed in the 10,000 metres at the 1988 Summer Olympics and the 1992 Summer Olympics.
