= Conceição Ferreira =

Portuguese long-distance runner (born 1962)

Medal record

Women's athletics

Representing Portugal

European Championships
Silver medal – second place	1994 Helsinki	10,000 m

Maria Conceição da Costa Ferreira (born 13 March 1962 in Aveleda) is a retired Portuguese long-distance runner.

She won the 1993 IAAF World Half Marathon Championships, and finished sixth in 10,000 metres at the 1993 World Championships.

== International competitions ==
Year	Competition	Venue	Position	Event	Notes
Representing Portugal
1984	Olympic Games	Los Angeles, United States	39th	Marathon	2:50:58
1986	Goodwill Games	Moscow, Soviet Union	13th	5000 m	15:54.01
1986	European Championships	Stuttgart, West Germany	26th	10,000 m	33:38.23
1988	Olympic Games	Seoul, South Korea	20th	Marathon	2:34:23
1990	Pittsburgh Marathon	Pittsburgh, United States	1st	Marathon	2:30:34
1990	European Championships	Split, SFR Yugoslavia	—	Marathon	DNF
1991	World Championships	Tokyo, Japan	11th	10,000 m	32:29.12
1993	World Championships	Stuttgart, Germany	6th	10,000 m	31:30.60
1994	European Championships	Helsinki, Finland	2nd	10,000 m	31:32.82
