= 1990 IAAF World Cross Country Championships – Senior women's race =

Senior women's race at the 1990 IAAF World Cross Country Championships
- Organisers: IAAF
- Edition: 18th
- Date: March 25
- Host city: Aix-les-Bains, Rhône-Alpes, France
- Venue: Hippodrome de Marlioz
- Events: 1
- Distances: 6 km – Senior women
- Participation: 139 athletes from 35 nations

The Senior women's race at the 1990 IAAF World Cross Country Championships was held in Aix-les-Bains, France, at the Hippodrome de Marlioz on March 25, 1990. A report on the event was given in the Glasgow Herald.

Complete results, medallists, and the results of British athletes were published.

== Race results ==
=== Senior women's race (6 km) ===
==== Individual ====
Rank	Athlete	Country	Time
1st place, gold medalist(s)	Lynn Jennings	United States	19:21
2nd place, silver medalist(s)	Albertina Dias	Portugal	19:33
3rd place, bronze medalist(s)	Yelena Romanova	Soviet Union	19:33
4	Luchia Yeshak	Ethiopia	19:33
5	Nadia Dandolo	Italy	19:39
6	Jane Ngotho	Kenya	19:41
7	Conceição Ferreira	Portugal	19:45
8	Viorica Ghican	Romania	19:47
9	Margaret Wairimu	Kenya	19:49
10	Nadezhda Galyamova	Soviet Union	19:50
11	Olga Nazarkina	Soviet Union	19:51
12	Iulia Negura	Romania	19:51
13	Regina Chistyakova	Soviet Union	19:52
14	Jeanne-Marie Pipoz	Switzerland	19:52
15	Derartu Tulu	Ethiopia	19:53
16	Estela Estévez	Spain	19:53
17	Annette Sergent	France	19:55
18	Susan Hobson	Australia	19:56
19	Marcianne Mukamurenzi	Rwanda	19:59
20	Martine Fays	France	20:00
21	Aurora Cunha	Portugal	20:01
22	Anuța Cătună	Romania	20:01
23	Véronique Collard	Belgium	20:02
24	Jenny Lund	Australia	20:03
25	Adanech Erkulo	Ethiopia	20:03
26	Carolyn Schuwalov	Australia	20:03
27	Julia Vaquero	Spain	20:04
28	Natalya Sorokivskaya	Soviet Union	20:05
29	Odile Ohier	France	20:05
30	Angela Chalmers	Canada	20:06
31	Getenesh Urge	Ethiopia	20:06
32	Gitte Karlshøj	Denmark	20:06
33	Sabrina Dornhoefer	United States	20:07
34	Elaine van Blunk	United States	20:07
35	Sonia McGeorge	United Kingdom	20:08
36	Kumi Araki	Japan	20:08
37	Marjan Freriks	Netherlands	20:09
38	Kathrin Ullrich	East Germany	20:14
39	Liève Slegers	Belgium	20:15
40	Catherina McKiernan	Ireland	20:16
41	Kaori Kumura	Japan	20:17
42	Naomi Yoshida	Japan	20:17
43	Maria Curatolo	Italy	20:18
44	Shelly Steely	United States	20:20
45	María Luisa Servín	Mexico	20:21
46	Martine Oppliger	Switzerland	20:23
47	Laura Adam	United Kingdom	20:23
48	Annette Hüls	West Germany	20:24
49	Lucy Smith	Canada	20:24
50	Mónica Gama	Portugal	20:27
51	Tatyana Pozdnyakova	Soviet Union	20:27
52	Leah Pells	Canada	20:27
53	Yoshie Terazawa	Japan	20:27
54	Anke Schäning	East Germany	20:28
55	Lisa Harvey	Canada	20:28
56	Dolores Rizo	Spain	20:29
57	Nancy Patteet	Belgium	20:30
58	Anette Dwyer	Australia	20:32
59	Farida Fatès	France	20:33
60	Elena Fidatof	Romania	20:33
61	Sachiko Yamashita	Japan	20:35
62	Corinne Debaets	Belgium	20:37
63	Maria Starovská	Czechoslovakia	20:38
64	Carlien Harms	Netherlands	20:38
65	Birgit Jerschabek	East Germany	20:39
66	Tigist Moreda	Ethiopia	20:39
67	Anja de Brabant	Belgium	20:40
68	Roisin Smyth	Ireland	20:40
69	Fatima Maama	Morocco	20:40
70	Marian Sutton	United Kingdom	20:41
71	Robyn Meagher	Canada	20:41
72	Lucilia Soares	Portugal	20:42
73	Zahra Ouaziz	Morocco	20:43
74	Ana Isabel Alonso	Spain	20:44
75	María del Carmen Díaz	Mexico	20:45
76	Silvana Pereira	Brazil	20:46
77	Carmen Fuentes	Spain	20:48
78	Addis Gezagne	Ethiopia	20:49
79	Annette Fincke	East Germany	20:49
80	Mariana Stanescu	Romania	20:50
81	Nives Curti	Italy	20:50
82	Christien Toonstra	Netherlands	20:54
83	Christine Kennedy	Ireland	20:55
84	Margaret Kagiri	Kenya	20:57
85	Mary O'Connor	New Zealand	20:59
86	Tanja Kalinowski	West Germany	20:59
87	Lucinda Martin	United Kingdom	21:00
88	Isabella Moretti	Switzerland	21:01
89	Valentina Tauceri	Italy	21:02
90	Florence Wangechi	Kenya	21:02
91	Martha Ernstdóttir	Iceland	21:04
92	Carmen Brunet	Spain	21:05
93	Carole Connolly	Australia	21:05
94	Izumi Maki	Japan	21:06
95	Anne Viallix	France	21:06
96	Niamh Murphy	Ireland	21:06
97	Pavlina Evro	Albania	21:07
98	Mébarka El Hadj Abdellah	Algeria	21:07
99	Alison Wyeth	United Kingdom	21:09
100	Liri Brahja	Albania	21:09
101	Rizoneide Vanderley	Brazil	21:10
102	Betty Molteni	Italy	21:10
103	Leanne Martin	United States	21:11
104	Daria Nauer	Switzerland	21:11
105	Lotta Legernes	Sweden	21:13
106	Benita Perez	Mexico	21:13
107	Blanca Jaime	Mexico	21:14
108	Luz Fabiola Rueda	Colombia	21:15
109	Christine Feuillet	France	21:15
110	Ulla Marquette	Canada	21:16
111	Laura Faccio	Italy	21:18
112	Teresa Duffy	Ireland	21:19
113	Claudia Metzner	West Germany	21:21
114	Ursula Noctor	Ireland	21:22
115	Joy Terry	Australia	21:23
116	Andrea Fleischer	East Germany	21:24
117	Janet Smith	United States	21:24
118	Rita de Jesús	Brazil	21:29
119	Donika Hanxhara	Albania	21:30
120	Nanda Shaner Yadav	India	21:32
121	Manushaqe Taku	Albania	21:35
122	Solange de Souza	Brazil	21:41
123	Annet Bezemer	Netherlands	21:43
124	Nelly Glauser	Switzerland	21:44
125	Pauline Konga	Kenya	21:47
126	Anila Mekshi	Albania	21:48
127	Kerstin Streck	West Germany	21:48
128	Nelly Aerts	Belgium	21:49
129	Vijay Nilman Khalko	India	21:52
130	Charulatha Naigaonkar	India	22:06
131	Brenda Sleeuwenhoek	Netherlands	22:09
132	Karla Guerrero	Mexico	22:13
133	Lee Hsiao-Chuan	Chinese Taipei	22:15
134	Lukose Leelamma	India	22:30
135	Zehava Shmueli	Israel	22:46
136	Lisbeth Crafach	Denmark	22:47
137	Olga Avalos	Mexico	22:49
138	Marie-Cecile Rivetta	Monaco	22:55
—	Fernanda Marques	Portugal	DNF

==== Teams ====
Rank	Team	Points
1st place, gold medalist(s)	Soviet Union: Yelena Romanova / 3; Nadezhda Galyamova / 10; Olga Nazarkina / 11; Regina Chistyakova / 13; (Natalya Sorokivskaya) / (28); (Tatyana Pozdnyakova) / (51)	37
2nd place, silver medalist(s)	Ethiopia: Luchia Yeshak / 4; Derartu Tulu / 15; Adanech Erkulo / 25; Getenesh Urge / 31; (Tigist Moreda) / (66); (Addis Gezagne) / (78)	75
3rd place, bronze medalist(s)	Portugal: Albertina Dias / 2; Conceição Ferreira / 7; Aurora Cunha / 21; Mónica Gama / 50; (Lucilia Soares) / (72); (Fernanda Marques) / (DNF)	80
4	Romania: Viorica Ghican / 8; Iulia Negura / 12; Anuța Cătună / 22; Elena Fidatof / 60; (Mariana Stanescu) / (80)	102
5	United States: Lynn Jennings / 1; Sabrina Dornhoefer / 33; Elaine van Blunk / 34; Shelly Steely / 44; (Leanne Martin) / (103); (Janet Smith) / (117)	112
6	France: Annette Sergent / 17; Martine Fays / 20; Odile Ohier / 29; Farida Fatès / 59; (Anne Viallix) / (95); (Christine Feuillet) / (109)	125
7	Australia: Susan Hobson / 18; Jenny Lund / 24; Carolyn Schuwalov / 26; Anette Dwyer / 58; (Carole Connolly) / (93); (Joy Terry) / (115)	126
8	Japan: Kumi Araki / 36; Kaori Kumura / 41; Naomi Yoshida / 42; Yoshie Terazawa / 53; (Sachiko Yamashita) / (61); (Izumi Maki) / (94)	172
9	Spain: Estela Estévez / 16; Julia Vaquero / 27; Dolores Rizo / 56; Ana Isabel Alonso / 74; (Carmen Fuentes) / (77); (Carmen Brunet) / (92)	173
10	Belgium: Véronique Collard / 23; Liève Slegers / 39; Nancy Patteet / 57; Corinne Debaets / 62; (Anja de Brabant) / (67); (Nelly Aerts) / (128)	181
11	Canada: Angela Chalmers / 30; Lucy Smith / 49; Leah Pells / 52; Lisa Harvey / 55; (Robyn Meagher) / (71); (Ulla Marquette) / (110)	186
12	Kenya: Jane Ngotho / 6; Margaret Wairimu / 9; Margaret Kagiri / 84; Florence Wangechi / 90; (Pauline Konga) / (125)	189
13	Italy: Nadia Dandolo / 5; Maria Curatolo / 43; Nives Curti / 81; Valentina Tauceri / 89; (Betty Molteni) / (102); (Laura Faccio) / (111)	218
14	East Germany: Kathrin Ullrich / 38; Anke Schäning / 54; Birgit Jerschabek / 65; Annette Fincke / 79; (Andrea Fleischer) / (116)	236
15	United Kingdom: Sonia McGeorge / 35; Laura Adam / 47; Marian Sutton / 70; Lucinda Martin / 87; (Alison Wyeth) / (99)	239
16	Switzerland: Jeanne-Marie Pipoz / 14; Martine Oppliger / 46; Isabella Moretti / 88; Daria Nauer / 104; (Nelly Glauser) / (124)	252
17	Ireland: Catherina McKiernan / 40; Roisin Smyth / 68; Christine Kennedy / 83; Niamh Murphy / 96; (Teresa Duffy) / (112); (Ursula Noctor) / (114)	287
18	Netherlands: Marjan Freriks / 37; Carlien Harms / 64; Christien Toonstra / 82; Annet Bezemer / 123; (Brenda Sleeuwenhoek) / (131)	306
19	Mexico: María Luisa Servín / 45; María del Carmen Díaz / 75; Benita Perez / 106; Blanca Jaime / 107; (Karla Guerrero) / (132); (Olga Avalos) / (137)	333
20	West Germany: Annette Hüls / 48; Tanja Kalinowski / 86; Claudia Metzner / 113; Kerstin Streck / 127	374
21	Brazil: Silvana Pereira / 76; Rizoneide Vanderley / 101; Rita de Jesús / 118; Solange de Souza / 122	417
22	Albania: Pavlina Evro / 97; Liri Brahja / 100; Donika Hanxhara / 119; Manushaqe Taku / 121; (Anila Mekshi) / (126)	437
23	India: Nanda Shaner Yadav / 120; Vijay Nilman Khalko / 129; Charulatha Naigaonkar / 130; Lukose Leelamma / 134	513

- Note: Athletes in parentheses did not score for the team result

== Participation ==
An unofficial count yields the participation of 139 athletes from 35 countries in the Senior women's race. This is in agreement with the official numbers as published.

- Albania (5)
- Algeria (1)
- Australia (6)
- Belgium (6)
- Brazil (4)
- Canada (6)
- Chinese Taipei (1)
- Colombia (1)
- Czechoslovakia (1)
- Denmark (2)
- East Germany (5)
- Ethiopia (6)
- France (6)
- Iceland (1)
- India (4)
- Ireland (6)
- Israel (1)
- Italy (6)
- Japan (6)
- Kenya (5)
- Mexico (6)
- Monaco (1)
- Morocco (2)
- Netherlands (5)
- New Zealand (1)
- Portugal (6)
- Romania (5)
- Rwanda (1)
- Soviet Union (6)
- Spain (6)
- Sweden (1)
- Switzerland (5)
- United Kingdom (5)
- United States (6)
- West Germany (4)

== See also ==
- 1990 IAAF World Cross Country Championships – Senior men's race
- 1990 IAAF World Cross Country Championships – Junior men's race
- 1990 IAAF World Cross Country Championships – Junior women's race
