= 1991 World Championships in Athletics – Women's 10,000 metres =

Video on YouTube Official Video

The women's 10,000 metres event featured at the 1991 World Championships in Tokyo, Japan. There were a total of 49 participating athletes, with two qualifying heats and the final being held on 30 August 1991.

== Medalists ==
Gold	(United Kingdom) Liz McColgan; Great Britain (GBR)
Silver	Zhong Huandi; PR China (CHN)
Bronze	Wang Xiuting; PR China (CHN)

== Schedule ==
- All times are Japan Standard Time (UTC+9)

Heats
27.08.1991 – 20:25h
Final
30.08.1991 – 19:05h

== Final ==
RANK	FINAL	TIME
	Liz McColgan (GBR)	31:14.31
	Zhong Huandi (CHN)	31:35.08
	Wang Xiuting (CHN)	31:35.99
4.	Kathrin Ullrich (GER)	31:38.96
5.	Lynn Jennings (USA)	31:54.44
6.	Uta Pippig (GER)	31:55.68
7.	Ingrid Kristiansen (NOR)	32:10.75
8.	Derartu Tulu (ETH)	32:16.55
9.	Jill Hunter (GBR)	32:24.55
10.	Luchia Yishak (ETH)	32:27.61
11.	Conceição Ferreira (POR)	32:29.12
12.	Delilah Asiago (KEN)	32:33.71
13.	Tatyana Pozdnyakova (URS)	32:35.17
14.	Wang Yongmei (CHN)	32:40.22
15.	Rosanna Munerotto (ITA)	32:44.43
16.	Miki Igarashi (JPN)	32:44.62
17.	Iulia Negura-Olteanu (ROM)	32:53.57
18.	Carole Rouillard (CAN)	32:58.77
19.	Annette Sergent-Palluy (FRA)	33:01.92
20.	Izumi Maki (JPN)	33:27.84
21.	Jane Ngotho (KEN)	33:36.91
—	Albertina Dias (POR)	DNF
—	Yelena Romanova (URS)	DNF
—	Päivi Tikkanen (FIN)	DNF
—	Anne Marie Letko-Lauck (USA)	DNF

== Qualifying heats ==
- Held on Tuesday 1991-08-27

RANK	HEAT 1	TIME
1.	Iulia Negura-Olteanu (ROM)	31:52.58
2.	Wang Xiuting (CHN)	31:53.13
3.	Kathrin Ullrich (GER)	31:54.05
4.	Jill Hunter (GBR)	31:55.55
5.	Annette Sergent-Palluy (FRA)	31:55.97
6.	Luchia Yishak (ETH)	31:56.42
7.	Lynn Jennings (USA)	31:56.52
8.	Carole Rouillard (CAN)	31:56.74
9.	Izumi Maki (JPN)	31:57.23
10.	Conceição Ferreira (POR)	31:59.13
11.	Tatyana Pozdnyakova (URS)	32:00.24
12.	Wang Yongmei (CHN)	32:00.27
13.	Delilah Asiago (KEN)	32:04.53
14.	Rosanna Munerotto (ITA)	32:05.75
15.	Suzana Ćirić (YUG)	32:28.09
16.	Lieve Slegers (BEL)	32:31.55
17.	Carmem de Oliveira (BRA)	32:36.44
18.	Claudia Dreher (GER)	32:44.94
19.	Olga Nazarkina (URS)	32:55.65
20.	Zita Ágoston (HUN)	33:07.19
21.	Martha Ernstdóttir (ISL)	33:10.93
22.	Maria-Luisa Servin (MEX)	33:13.70
23.	Jenny Lund (AUS)	33:15.18
24.	Valerie McGovern (IRL)	35:08.40

RANK	HEAT 2	TIME
1.	Derartu Tulu (ETH)	31:45.95
2.	Ingrid Kristiansen (NOR)	31:50.36
3.	Liz McColgan (GBR)	31:54.67
4.	Zhong Huandi (CHN)	31:58.82
5.	Uta Pippig (GER)	32:00.76
6.	Miki Igarashi (JPN)	32:01.04
7.	Albertina Dias (POR)	32:03.76
8.	Päivi Tikkanen (FIN)	32:06.67
9.	Yelena Romanova (URS)	32:06.73
10.	Jane Ngotho (KEN)	32:09.38
11.	Anne Marie Letko-Lauck (USA)	32:26.65
12.	Akemi Matsuno (JPN)	32:31.18
13.	Marcianne Mukamurenzi (RWA)	32:33.27
14.	Lisa Harvey (CAN)	32:41.87
15.	Rosario Murcia (FRA)	32:49.75
16.	Olga Appell (MEX)	32:54.63
17.	Susan Hobson (AUS)	33:21.20
18.	Odile Ohier (FRA)	33:22.55
19.	Lesley Morton (NZL)	33:23.17
20.	María del Carmen Díaz (MEX)	33:46.24
21.	Anuța Cătună (ROM)	34:12.44
22.	Griselda González (ARG)	34:16.26
23.	Vilma Peña (CRC)	35:06.98
—	Francie Larrieu-Smith (USA)	DNF
—	Fernanda Marques (POR)	DNF

== See also ==
- 1988 Women's Olympic 10.000 metres (Seoul)
- 1990 Women's European Championships 10.000 metres (Split)
- 1992 Women's Olympic 10.000 metres (Barcelona)
