= 1992 New York City Marathon =

Marathon in New York City

23rd New York City Marathon
- Venue: New York City, New York
- Date: November 1

Champions
- Men: Willie Mtolo (2:09:29)
- Women: Lisa Ondieki (2:24:40)

The 1992 New York City Marathon was the 23rd running of the annual marathon race in New York City, New York, which took place on Sunday, November 1. The men's elite race was won by South Africa's Willie Mtolo in a time of 2:09:29 hours while the women's race was won by Australia's Lisa Ondieki in 2:24:40.

A total of 27,797 runners finished the race, 22,536 men and 5441 women.

== Results ==
=== Men ===
| Position | Athlete | Nationality | Time |
|---|---|---|---|
| 1st place, gold medalist(s) | Willie Mtolo | South Africa | 2:09:29 |
| 2nd place, silver medalist(s) | Andrés Espinosa | Mexico | 2:10:53 |
| 3rd place, bronze medalist(s) | Kim Wan-gi | South Korea | 2:10:54 |
| 4 | Osmiro Silva | Brazil | 2:12:50 |
| 5 | Antoni Niemczak | Poland | 2:13:00 |
| 6 | Walter Durbano | Italy | 2:13:24 |
| 7 | Luca Barzaghi | Italy | 2:13:24 |
| 8 | Driss Dacha | Morocco | 2:13:35 |
| 9 | David Lewis | United Kingdom | 2:13:49 |
| 10 | Steve Brace | United Kingdom | 2:14:10 |
| 11 | Ed Eyestone | United States | 2:14:19 |
| 12 | Risto Ulmala | Finland | 2:14:32 |
| 13 | Faustino Reynoso | Mexico | 2:14:45 |
| 14 | Severino Bernardini | Italy | 2:14:46 |
| 15 | Jesús Herrera | Mexico | 2:16:07 |
| 16 | Dominique Chauvelier | France | 2:16:33 |
| 17 | Sammy Lelei | Kenya | 2:18:16 |
| 18 | Dick Tesselaar | Netherlands | 2:18:31 |
| 19 | Regis Ancel | France | 2:18:34 |
| 20 | Marcos Luis Barreto | Mexico | 2:19:13 |

=== Women ===
| Position | Athlete | Nationality | Time |
|---|---|---|---|
| 1st place, gold medalist(s) | Lisa Ondieki | Australia | 2:24:40 |
| 2nd place, silver medalist(s) | Olga Markova | Russia | 2:26:38 |
| 3rd place, bronze medalist(s) | Yoshiko Yamamoto | Japan | 2:29:58 |
| 4 | Kamila Gradus | Poland | 2:30:09 |
| 5 | Bettina Sabatini | Italy | 2:31:30 |
| 6 | Suzana Ćirić | Yugoslavia | 2:33:58 |
| 7 | Sally Eastall | United Kingdom | 2:34:05 |
| 8 | Irina Bogacheva | Kyrgyzstan | 2:34:31 |
| 9 | Kerstin Preßler | Germany | 2:34:52 |
| 10 | Maria Rebelo | France | 2:36:40 |
| 11 | Alevtina Naumova | Russia | 2:37:19 |
| 12 | Franca Fiacconi | Italy | 2:39:26 |
| 13 | Sissel Grottenberg | Norway | 2:40:34 |
| 14 | Jane Welzel | United States | 2:41:22 |
| 15 | Gillian Horovitz | United Kingdom | 2:42:23 |
| 16 | Jean Chodnicki | United States | 2:45:53 |
| 17 | Odile Leveque | France | 2:46:58 |
| 18 | Petra Maak | Germany | 2:47:28 |
| 19 | Radka Pátková | Czechoslovakia | 2:48:25 |
| 20 | Anita Andersson | Sweden | 2:48:52 |
| — | Gordon Bakoulis | United States | DQ^{[nb]} |
| — | Kim Jones | United States | DNF |

- ^{nb} Gordon Bakoulis originally finished in sixth place with a time of 2:33:26, but was subsequently disqualified after failing a drug test for Probenecid, a substance banned as a masking agent. Bakoulis successfully appealed a four-year doping ban on the grounds she had taken the substance to treat Lyme disease, but the result remained annulled.
