= Gasparilla Distance Classic =

Annual footrace in Tampa, Florida, United States

- Gasparilla Distance Classic logo
- Date: late February-early March
- Location: Tampa, Florida
- Event type: Half Marathon, 15K, 8K, 5K
- Primary sponsor: Publix
- Established: 1978
- Edition: 50th
- Course records: 15K Men: 42:35 (1994); Phillimon Hanneck; 15K Women: 47:03 (1988); Elizabeth Nuttall; Half Men: 1:03:16 (2015); Dathan Ritzenhein; Half Women: 1:12:34 (2015); Jennifer Rhines
- Website: rungasparilla.com/
- Participants: 20,000 (2026); 29,000 (2025) Record

The Gasparilla Distance Classic is a road race event with several races which are held in late February or early March on Bayshore Boulevard in Tampa, Florida. Over 20,000 competitors participated in 2026 and 2027 will be the 50th race year. It is named after the Gasparilla Pirate Festival, which takes place on Tampa's Bayshore Boulevard a few weeks earlier.

== History ==
The Gasparilla Distance Classic Association, established in 1978, provides funding for Tampa Bay area running programs and youth organizations. It administers the annual Gasparilla Distance Classic Race weekend and the Junior Gasparilla Distance Classic, both sponsored by Publix Super Markets. Races were first run in February of that year and since then, $7 million has been raised and donated to non-profit organizations including Big Brothers Big Sisters of Tampa, Friends of Tampa Parks & Recreation, Boys & Girls Clubs of Tampa, Girls Inc. of Pinellas and other running programs. More than 485,000+ runners and walkers have finished races.

The race weekend includes the Half Marathon, 8k, the Publix Super Markets Gasparilla Distance Classic 15K & 5K, Kellogg's 5K Walk, Fifth Third Bank Half Marathon Team Challenge & Stroller Roll, Michelob Ultra Challenge (15K, 5K, Half Marathon & 8K) and the Beck's Light Challenge (15K, 5K & Half Marathon)

The Gasparilla Distance Classic used to include a marathon race (26.2 miles). The final marathon was in 2010 and titled the "Final Voyage". Wilson Chepkwony of Kenya was the Men’s 2010 Marathon Champion with a time of 2:24:48 and Melissa Gacek of St. Paul, Minn was the Women’s 2010 Marathon Champion with a time of 2:53:20

=== Human interest stories ===
In 2008 Iraq war veteran Ivan Castro ran 20.0975 kilometres (12.4880 mi) of the Gasparilla Classic only 17 months after being blinded by shrapnel on a rooftop in Baghdad.

Lieutenant Colonel Sam Arwood ran the 2010 Gasparilla Marathon 7,800 miles (12,600 km) away on a treadmill in Afghanistan. Sam had originally planned to run in the marathon in Tampa, but was deployed one month before the race. He was given the Ok by race officials to run a course on base in Afghanistan, but was forced onto a treadmill after heavy rains ruined the outdoor track.

== Charity ==
The Challenged Athletes Foundation(CAF) sponsors the LabCorp Elite 15K Wheelchair Division. CAF raises money to help people with physical disabilities pursue an active lifestyle through physical fitness and athletics.

The Mendez Foundation Too Good For Drugs Junior Gasparilla Distance Classic is a free mini-marathon, now in its 20th year, for children ages 2 to 10. The race emphasizes participation over competition. Every child receives a race bib with the number "1" printed on it, as well as a goody bag, T-shirt and, after crossing the finish line, a competitor's medal.

2011 Charitable Organizations & Running Related Programs Supported By The Gasparilla Distance Classic Association, Inc.:

- Boys and Girls Club of Tampa Bay
- Girls INC.
- Friends of Tampa Recreation INC.
- St. Joseph's Hospital Foundation
- Richard's Run
- National Psoriasis Foundation
- Because of Ezra
- Wounded Warrior Foundation
- Team Olivia
- Girls On The Run

Tampa Cross Country & Track Programs:

- University of Tampa
- Bloomingdale High School
- Chamberlain High School
- Plant High School
- Robinson High School
- Sickles High School
- Steinbrenner High School
- Wharton High School

Youth Running Programs:

- Fifth Third Bank Too Good For Drugs Jr. Gasparilla Distance Classic
- Florida Blue Kids Running Program
- Tampa Police Memorial Run

== Race purse ==
In 2027, total prize money is $20,000; however, only local residents of the seven counties around Tampa Bay are eligible for the cash: Hillsborough, Pinellas, Pasco, Polk, Hernando, Manatee and Sarasota. There are separate but equal awards for men and women in both the 15K and half-marathon.

Individual Awards 15K
| | 1st | 2nd | 3rd | 4th | 5th |
|---|---|---|---|---|---|
| Men | $2,000 | $1,500 | $750 | $500 | $250 |
| Women | $2,000 | $1,500 | $750 | $500 | $250 |

Individual Awards Half Marathon
| | 1st | 2nd | 3rd | 4th | 5th |
|---|---|---|---|---|---|
| Men | $2,000 | $1,500 | $750 | $500 | $250 |
| Women | $2,000 | $1,500 | $750 | $500 | $250 |

== Past 15K winners ==
Key: Course record

| Edition | Year | Men's winner | Time (m:s) | Women's winner | Time (m:s) |
|---|---|---|---|---|---|
| 1st | 1978 | Bill Rodgers (USA) | 44:29 | Kim Merritt (USA) | 55:40 |
| 2nd | 1979 | Ralph King (USA) | 44:12 | Gayle Olinekova (CAN) | 53:17 |
| 3rd | 1980 | Greg Meyer (USA) | 43:40 | Grete Waitz (NOR) | 48:01 |
| 4th | 1981 | Ric Rojas (USA) | 43:12 | Grete Waitz (NOR) | 48:12 |
| 5th | 1982 | Michael Musyoki (KEN) | 43:09 | Grete Waitz (NOR) | 48:26 |
| 6th | 1983 | Robert de Castella (AUS) | 42:47 | Wendy Sly (GBR) | 48:18 |
| 7th | 1984 | Mike McLeod (GBR) | 42:55 | Grete Waitz (NOR) | 47:52 |
| 8th | 1985 | Mike McLeod (GBR) | 43:02 | Grete Waitz (NOR) | 48:10 |
| 9th | 1986 | John Treacy (IRL) | 42:59 | Ingrid Kristiansen (NOR) | 48:00 |
| 10th | 1987 | Marcos Barreto (MEX) | 43:17 | Grete Waitz (NOR) | 48:50 |
| 11th | 1988 | Marcos Barreto (MEX) | 42:37 | Liz McColgan (GBR) | 47:43 |
| 12th | 1989 | Keith Brantly (USA) | 42:50 | Ingrid Kristiansen (NOR) | 48:14 |
| 13th | 1990 | John Halvorsen (NOR) | 43:25 | Judi St. Hilaire (USA) | 49:26 |
| 14th | 1991 | John Halvorsen (NOR) | 43:14 | Jill Boltz (GBR) | 49:00 |
| 15th | 1992 | Valdenor dos Santos (BRA) | 43:10 | Wilma van Onna (NED) | 49:11 |
| 16th | 1993 | Valdenor dos Santos (BRA) | 42:41 | Carmem de Oliveira (BRA) | 49:03 |
| 17th | 1994 | Phillimon Hanneck (ZIM) | 42:35 | Elana Meyer (RSA) | 48:11 |
| 18th | 1995 | Josephat Machuka (KEN) | 42:37 | Delilah Asiago (KEN) | 48:38 |
| 19th | 1996 | Jon Brown (GBR) | 42:42 | Tegla Loroupe (KEN) | 48:30 |
| 20th | 1997 | Joseph Kimani (KEN) | 43:11 | Elana Meyer (RSA) | 48:48 |
| 21st | 1998 | Gabino Apolonio (MEX) | 43:23 | Lornah Kiplagat (KEN) | 49:24 |
| 22nd | 1999 | Russ Gerbers (USA) | 46:48 | Laura Drake (USA) | 54:33 |
| 23rd | 2000 | Russ Gerbers (USA) | 46:37 | Laura Drake (USA) | 52:59 |
| 24th | 2001 | Muchapiwa Mazano (ZIM) | 48:50 | Laura Drake (USA) | 54:47 |
| 25th | 2002 | Tony Teats (USA) | 46:36 | Monica Joyce (USA) | 55:10 |
| 26th | 2003 | Ronnie Holassie (TRI) | 46:40 | Amy Begley (USA) | 52:21 |
| 27th | 2004 | Joep Tigchelaar (NED) | 46:37 | Rosa Gutierrez (USA) | 55:20 |
| 28th | 2005 | Elias Gonzalez (USA) | 48:23 | Victoria Gill (GBR) | 54:00 |
| 29th | 2006 | Elias Gonzalez (USA) | 48:39 | Victoria Gill (GBR) | 53:47 |
| 30th | 2007 | Todd Snyder (USA) | 45:48 | Christa Benton (USA) | 54:27 |
| 31st | 2008 | Joseph Sitienei (KEN) | 46:45 | Annie Cooper-Gasway (USA) | 56:00 |
| 32nd | 2009 | Ryan Hall (USA) | 43:26 | Christa Benton (USA) | 54:42 |
| 33rd | 2010 | Austin Richmond (USA) | 46:49 | Briana Whaley (USA) | 54:05 |
| 34th | 2011 | Elias Gonzalez (USA) | 46:22 | Jessica Crate (USA) | 54:05 |
| 35th | 2012 | Elias Gonzalez (USA) | 46:55 | Jessica Crate (USA) | 54:59 |
| 36th | 2013 | Jonathan Mott (USA) | 48:44 | Sara Petrick (USA) | 55:49 |
| 37th | 2014 | Jonathan Mott (USA) | 48:44 | Sara Petrick (USA) | 55:49 |
| 38th | 2015 | Jonathan Mott (USA) | 47:49 | Megan Goethals (USA) | 52:17 |
| 39th | 2016 | Mike Parrish (USA) | 46:38 | Becky Howarth (USA) | 54:47 |
| 40th | 2017 | Austin Richmond (USA) | 47:26 | Stephanie Pezzullo (USA) | 54:58 |
| 41st | 2018 | Jonathan Mott (USA) | 47:01 | Paige Howard (USA) | 57:15 |
| 42nd | 2019 | Chris Balestrini (CAN) | 47:12 | Becky Howarth (USA) | 55:49 |
| 43rd | 2020 | Phil Parrot-Migas (CAN) | 45:35 | Kristen Tenaglia (USA) | 54:08 |
| 44th | 2021 | | | | |
| 45th | 2022 | Phil Parrot-Migas (CAN) | 46:19 | Christina Welsh (USA) | 54:43 |
| 46th | 2023 | Jonathan Mott (USA) | 48:50 | Christina Welsh (USA) | 55:24 |
| 47th | 2024 | Luis Orta (USA) | 46:48 | Bethany Sachtleben (USA) | 52:22 |
| 48th | 2025 | Mike Tate (CAN) | 46:28 | Christina Welsh (USA) | 53:53 |
| 49th | 2026 | Phil Parrot-Migas (CAN) | 46:23 | Lindsay Flanagan (USA) | 51:24 |

== Past Half Marathon winners ==
Key: Course record

| Edition | Year | Men's winner | Time (h:m:s) | Women's winner | Time (h:m:s) |
|---|---|---|---|---|---|
| 38th | 2015 | Dathan Ritzenhein (USA) | 1:03:17 | Jennifer Rhines (USA) | 1:12:35 |
| 39th | 2016 | Austin Richmond (USA) | 1:07:33 | Kayla Atkinson (USA) | 1:20:45 |
| 40th | 2017 | Christo Landry (USA) | 1:03:08 | Stephanie Bruce (USA) | 1:12:53 |
| 41st | 2018 | Elkana Kibet (USA) | 1:03:39 | Sara Hall (USA) | 1:12:01 |
| 42nd | 2019 | Scott Fauble (USA) | 1:05:09 | Aliphine Tuliamuk (KEN) | 1:12:29 |
| 43rd | 2020 | Nick Kaleel (USA) | 1:09:20 | Megan Curham (USA) | 1:16:59 |
| 44th | 2021 | | | | |
| 45th | 2022 | Seth Demoor (USA) | 1:08:57 | Christina Welsh (USA) | 1:18:54 |
| 46th | 2023 | Jonathan Mott (USA) | 1:09:20 | Christina Welsh (USA) | 1:21:14 |
| 47th | 2024 | Adam McCollor (USA) | 1:09:49 | Christina Welsh (USA) | 1:18:28 |
| 48th | 2025 | Grant Colligan (USA) | 1:08:31 | Meaghan Strum (USA) | 1:16:08 |
| 49th | 2026 | Trevor Wysong (USA) | 1:09:30 | Anne-Marie Blaney (USA) | 1:15:43 |
