= 1992 Boston Marathon =

Footrace in Boston, Massachusetts, USA

- Venue: Boston, United States
- Dates: April 20

Champions
- Men: Ibrahim Hussein (2:08:14)
- Women: Olga Markova (2:23:43)

The 1992 Boston Marathon was the 96th running of the annual marathon race in Boston, United States, which was held on April 20. The elite men's race was won by Kenya's Ibrahim Hussein in a time of 2:08:14 hours and the women's race was won by Russia's Olga Markova in 2:23:43.

A total of 8123 runners finished the race, 6562 men and 1561 women.

== Results ==
=== Men ===
Position	Athlete	Nationality	Time
1st place, gold medalist(s)	Ibrahim Hussein	Kenya	2:08:14
2nd place, silver medalist(s)	Joaquim Pinheiro	Portugal	2:10:39
3rd place, bronze medalist(s)	Andrés Espinosa	Mexico	2:10:44
4	Juma Ikangaa	Tanzania	2:11:44
5	Joseildo da Silva	Brazil	2:11:53
6	Boniface Merande	Kenya	2:12:23
7	Jose Carlos da Silva	Brazil	2:12:25
8	Abebe Mekonnen	Ethiopia	2:13:09
9	Inocencio Miranda	Mexico	2:13:14
10	Tesfaye Tafa	Ethiopia	2:13:36
11	Steve Jones	Wales	2:13:55
12	Andrzej Witczak	Poland	2:14:06
13	Yuichiro Osuda	Japan	2:14:54
14	Carlos Grisales	Colombia	2:15:09
15	Delmir Alves Dos Santos	Brazil	2:16:21
16	Alejandro Cruz	Mexico	2:16:31
17	Pierre Lévisse	France	2:16:46
18	Juma Mnyampanda	Tanzania	2:16:49
19	Doug Kurtis	United States	2:17:03
20	Randy Haas	United States	2:17:36
21	Artemio Navarro	Mexico	2:17:48
22	Mats Erixon	Sweden	2:18:06
23	Pekka Roto	Finland	2:18:29
24	Isao Saito	Japan	2:18:49
25	Dennis Simonaitis	United States	2:18:59

=== Women ===
Position	Athlete	Nationality	Time
1st place, gold medalist(s)	Olga Markova	Russia	2:23:43
2nd place, silver medalist(s)	Yoshiko Yamamoto	Japan	2:26:26
3rd place, bronze medalist(s)	Uta Pippig	Germany	2:27:12
4	Manuela Machado	Portugal	2:27:42
5	Małgorzata Birbach	Poland	2:28:11
6	Wanda Panfil	Poland	2:29:29
7	Irina Bogacheva	Kyrgyzstan	2:32:45
8	Odette Lapierre	Canada	2:34:19
9	Ritva Lemettinen	Finland	2:34:30
10	Jane Welzel	United States	2:36:21
11	Satoe Minegishi	Japan	2:37:13
12	Anne Roden	United Kingdom	2:37:37
13	Judit Földing-Nagy	Hungary	2:38:33
14	Laura Dewald	United States	2:39:22
15	Gabrielle O'Rourke	New Zealand	2:39:36
16	Bernardine Portenski	New Zealand	2:39:56
17	Gillian Horovitz	United Kingdom	2:40:52
18	Petra Guevara	Mexico	2:41:04
19	Ena Guevara	Peru	2:41:48
20	Noriko Kawaguchi	Japan	2:43:11
21	Raisa Smekhnova	Belarus	2:43:46
22	Aurelia Dejesus	Mexico	2:43:46
23	Chie Matsuda	Japan	2:45:41
24	Barbara Adkins	United States	2:48:21
25	Judy Mercon	United States	2:48:24
