= 1995 World Championships in Athletics – Women's marathon =

The Women's Marathon at the 1995 World Championships in Gothenburg, Sweden was held on Sunday August 5, 1995. Due to judges' error the marathon course was 400 metres short of the normal distance as at the start the women left the stadium one lap too early.

== Medalists ==
Gold	Manuela Machado; Portugal (POR)
Silver	Anuța Cătună; Romania (ROM)
Bronze	Ornella Ferrara; Italy (ITA)

== Abbreviations ==
- All times shown are in hours:minutes:seconds

DNS	did not start
NM	no mark
WR	world record
WL	world leading
AR	area record
NR	national record
PB	personal best
SB	season best

== Records ==
Standing records prior to the 1995 World Athletics Championships
World Record	Ingrid Kristiansen (NOR)	2:21:06	April 21, 1985	London, United Kingdom
Event Record	Rosa Mota (POR)	2:25:17	August 29, 1987	Rome, Italy
Season Best	Uta Pippig (GER)	2:25:11	April 17, 1995	Boston, United States

== Final ranking ==
Rank	Athlete	Time	Note
1st place, gold medalist(s)	Manuela Machado (POR)	2:25:39	
2nd place, silver medalist(s)	Anuța Cătună (ROM)	2:26:25	
3rd place, bronze medalist(s)	Ornella Ferrara (ITA)	2:30:11	
4	Małgorzata Sobańska (POL)	2:31:10	
5	Ritva Lemettinen (FIN)	2:31:19	
6	Mónica Pont (ESP)	2:31:53	
7	Linda Somers (USA)	2:32:12	
8	Sonja Krolik (GER)	2:32:17	
9	Sachiyo Seiyama (JPN)	2:33:07	
10	Lidia Șimon (ROM)	2:33:18	
11	Miki Igarashi (JPN)	2:34:34	
12	Yukari Komatsu (JPN)	2:35:33	
13	Kirsi Rauta (FIN)	2:35:39	
14	Jane Salumäe (EST)	2:35:53	
15	Kerryn McCann (AUS)	2:36:29	
16	Kimberly Rosenquist-Jones (USA)	2:37:06	
17	Ingmarie Nilsson (SWE)	2:37:17	
18	Susan Mahony (AUS)	2:37:38	
19	Fatuma Roba (ETH)	2:39:27	
20	Nelly Glauser (SUI)	2:40:42	
21	Maria Luisa Muñoz (ESP)	2:41:37	
22	Trudi Thomson (GBR)	2:41:42	
23	Judit Földing-Nagy (HUN)	2:42:03	
24	Larisa Zyuzko (RUS)	2:42:12	
25	Cathy Shum (IRL)	2:43:20	
26	Nurten Tasdemir (TUR)	2:44:36	
27	Aura Buia (ROM)	2:45:13	
28	Alison Rose (GBR)	2:45:52	
29	Nyla Carroll (NZL)	2:50:25	
30	Chu Winnie Ng Lai (HKG)	3:01:08	
31	Isabel Tum (GUA)	3:02:02	
32	Gilda Mendez (PAN)	3:05:00	
DID NOT FINISH (DNF)
—	Maria Guadalupe Loma (MEX)	DNF	
—	Dorthe Rasmussen (DEN)	DNF	
—	Birgit Jerschabek (GER)	DNF	
—	Nadia Prasad (FRA)	DNF	
—	Carole Rouillard (CAN)	DNF	
—	Angelina Kanana (KEN)	DNF	
—	Anita Håkenstad (NOR)	DNF	
—	Rocío Ríos (ESP)	DNF	
—	Marina Belyayeva (RUS)	DNF	
—	Elaine Van Blunk (USA)	DNF	
—	Nadezhda Ilyina (RUS)	DNF	
DID NOT START (DNS)
—	Janet Mayal (BRA)	DNS	

== See also ==
- 1995 Marathon Year Ranking
- Women's Olympic Marathon (1996)
