= 1988 Chicago Marathon =

Footrace held in Chicago, Illinois

11th Chicago Marathon
- Venue: Chicago, United States
- Dates: October 30

Champions
- Men: Alejandro Cruz (2:08:57)
- Women: Lisa Rainsberger (2:29:17)

The 1988 Chicago Marathon was the 11th running of the annual marathon race in Chicago, United States and was held on October 30. The elite men's race was won by Mexico's Alejandro Cruz in a time of 2:08:57 hours and the women's race was won by America's Lisa Rainsberger in 2:29:17. It marked the return of the marathon distance at the competition, following a half marathon in 1987 due to sponsorship issues. A total of 5795 runners finished the race, a drop of over 2000 from the previous marathon-length outing in 1986.

== Results ==
=== Men ===
Position	Athlete	Nationality	Time
1st place, gold medalist(s)	Alejandro Cruz	Mexico	2:08:57
2nd place, silver medalist(s)	Yakov Tolstikov	Soviet Union	2:09:20
3rd place, bronze medalist(s)	Richard Kaitany	Kenya	2:09:39
4	Manuel Matias	Portugal	2:10:19
5	Michael O'Reilly	United Kingdom	2:11:50
6	Steve Brace	United Kingdom	2:11:50
7	Gerardo Alcalá	Mexico	2:12:11
8	Derek Froude	New Zealand	2:12:40
9	Elisio Rios	Portugal	2:12:53
10	Steve Binns	United Kingdom	2:13:32
11	Anthony Milovsorov	United Kingdom	2:14:02
12	Viktor Mosgovoy	Soviet Union	2:14:32
13	John Wheway	United Kingdom	2:14:38
14	Manuel Vera	Mexico	2:14:40
15	John Andrews	Australia	2:14:44
16	Budd Coates	United States	2:14:58
17	Jesús Valdez Falcón	Mexico	2:15:02
18	Derrick May	South Africa	2:17:36
19	Mark Curp	United States	2:18:05
20	Abraha Arega	Ethiopia	2:18:13

=== Women ===
Position	Athlete	Nationality	Time
1st place, gold medalist(s)	Lisa Rainsberger	United States	2:29:17
2nd place, silver medalist(s)	Emma Scaunich	Italy	2:29:46
3rd place, bronze medalist(s)	Paula Fudge	United Kingdom	2:29:47
4	Tani Ruckle	Australia	2:31:19
5	Kim Jones	United States	2:32:03
6	Kellie Archuletta	United States	2:32:29
7	Yelena Tsukhlo	Soviet Union	2:33:25
8	Yekaterina Khramenkova	Soviet Union	2:33:36
9	Midde Hamrin	Sweden	2:33:56
10	Irina Yagodina	Soviet Union	2:35:53
11	Terry Adams	Switzerland	2:36:50
12	Tatyana Gridnyeva	Soviet Union	2:37:36
13	Marty Cooksey	United States	2:38:35
14	Cassandra Mihailovic	France	2:39:47
15	Martha White	United States	2:42:15
16	Karen Bukowski	United States	2:46:21
17	Blanca Jaime	Mexico	2:47:54
18	Barbara Filutze	United States	2:48:49
19	Dorothy Goertzen	Canada	2:49:16
20	Dawn-Rae Bohensen	United States	2:49:41
