= 1989 IAAF World Women's Road Race Championships =

The 1989 IAAF World Women's Road Race Championships was the seventh edition of the annual international road running competition organised by the International Amateur Athletics Federation (IAAF). The competition was hosted by Brazil on 24 September 1989 in Rio de Janeiro and featured one race only: a 15K run for women. There were individual and team awards available, with the national team rankings being decided by the combined finishing positions of a team's top three runners. Countries with fewer than three finishers were not ranked.

The race was won by Wang Xiuting of China, who had been runner-up to Ingrid Kristiansen the previous year. She ran 49:34 minutes to finish ten seconds ahead of the runner-up, teammate Zhong Huandi, with former champion Aurora Cunha of Portugal in third place. With Wang Huabi in seventh, the Chinese team achieved a championship record-low score of ten points. The Portuguese women achieved the lowest non-winning score in championship history, with 15 points, with Cunha being followed home by fourth placed Albertina Machado and Albertina Dias in eighth. Showing the dominance of the race by a handful of nations, a Yekaterina Khramenkova-led Soviet Union also achieved the lowest ever score for third place on 24 points.

== Results ==
=== Individual ===
Rank	Athlete	Country	Time (m:s)
1st place, gold medalist(s)	Wang Xiuting	China (CHN)	49:34
2nd place, silver medalist(s)	Zhong Huandi	China (CHN)	49:44
3rd place, bronze medalist(s)	Aurora Cunha	Portugal (POR)	50:06
4	Albertina Machado	Portugal (POR)	50:16
5	Yekaterina Khramenkova	Soviet Union (URS)	50:21
6	Jill Hunter	Great Britain (GBR)	50:34
7	Wang Huabi	China (CHN)	50:42
8	Albertina Dias	Portugal (POR)	50:59
9	Nadezhda Stepanova	Soviet Union (URS)	51:05
10	Irina Yagodina	Soviet Union (URS)	51:06
11	Judy Chamberlin	United States (USA)	51:28
12	Anna Villani	Italy (ITA)	51:32
13	Angie Pain	Great Britain (GBR)	51:35
14	Allison Rabour	Italy (ITA)	52:02
15	Elena Tolstogouzova	Soviet Union (URS)	52:17
16	Anni Müller	Austria (AUT)	52:36
17	Jane Welzel	United States (USA)	52:44
18	Nives Curti	Italy (ITA)	52:52
19	María Luisa Servín	Mexico (MEX)	53:07
20	Janeth Mayal	Brazil (BRA)	53:18
21	Márcia Narloch	Brazil (BRA)	53:20
22	Yolanda Quimbita	Ecuador (ECU)	53:28
23	Susan Dilnot	Great Britain (GBR)	53:35
24	Tani Ruckle	Australia (AUS)	53:42
25	Carole Connelly	Australia (AUS)	53:52
26	Marina Prat	Spain (ESP)	53:53
27	Carmen Brunet	Spain (ESP)	53:54
29	Debbie Elsmore	New Zealand (NZL)	54:06
30	Monica O'Reilly	United States (USA)	54:08
31	Carmem de Oliveira	Brazil (BRA)	54:17
32	Lesley Graham	New Zealand (NZL)	54:19
33	Griselda González	Argentina (ARG)	54:19
34	Patricia Griffin	Ireland (IRL)	54:24
36	Lynn Harding	Great Britain (GBR)	54:30
37	Kimball Dryden	United States (USA)	54:45
38	Santa Velasquez	Mexico (MEX)	54:49
39	Leslie Lewis	United States (USA)	54:54
40	Marta Jimenez	Mexico (MEX)	55:15
41	Wilma Guerra	Ecuador (ECU)	55:19
43	Mary Brayley	Ireland (IRL)	55:43
44	Carmen Díaz	Spain (ESP)	56:20
45	Elsa Calderon	Chile (CHI)	56:32
46	Marisol Cossio	Bolivia (BOL)	56:45
50	Silvana Pereira	Brazil (BRA)	58:07
51	Janeth Alder	Ecuador (ECU)	58:14
61	Trudy Fenton	Australia (AUS)	60:01
63	Julia Sakala	Zimbabwe (ZIM)	61:47

=== Team ===
Rank	Team	Points
1st place, gold medalist(s)	China (CHN); Wang Xiuting; Zhong Huandi; Wang Huabi	10 pts
2nd place, silver medalist(s)	Portugal (POR); Aurora Cunha; Albertina Machado; Albertina Dias	15 pts
3rd place, bronze medalist(s)	Soviet Union (URS); Yekaterina Khramenkova; Nadezhda Stepanova; Irina Yagodina	24 pts
