= Athletics at the 1990 Commonwealth Games – Women's 10,000 metres =

Women's 10,000 metres at the Commonwealth Games

The women's 10,000 metres event at the 1990 Commonwealth Games was held on 2 February at the Mount Smart Stadium in Auckland.

== Results ==
Rank	Name	Nationality	Time	Notes
1st place, gold medalist(s)	Liz McColgan	Scotland	32:23.56	
2nd place, silver medalist(s)	Jill Hunter	England	32:33.21	
3rd place, bronze medalist(s)	Barbara Moore	New Zealand	32:44.73	
4	Carole Rouillard	Canada	32:49.36	
5	Jane Ngotho	Kenya	32:54.20	
6	Susan Hobson	Australia	32:54.92	
7	Jenny Lund	Australia	32:58.68	
8	Jane Shields	England	32:59.42	
9	Lizanne Bussières	Canada	33:16.65	
10	Sue Lee	Canada	33:22.63	
11	Anne Audain	New Zealand	33:40.13	
12	Karen MacLeod	Scotland	34:24.71	
13	Anne Hannam	New Zealand	34:42.62	
	Angela Tooby	Wales	DNF	
	Wendy Sly	England	DNF	
	Andri Avraam	Cyprus	DNS	
	Brenda Walker	Isle of Man	DNS	
