= Wang Xiuting =

Chinese long-distance runner

Medal record

Women's athletics

Representing China

World Championships
Bronze medal – third place	1991 Tokyo	10,000 m

World Road Race Championships
Gold medal – first place	1989 Rio de Janeiro	15 km
Silver medal – second place	1988 Adelaide	15 km

Asian Games
Gold medal – first place	1986 Seoul	10,000 m
Silver medal – second place	1990 Beijing	10,000 m

East Asian Games
Silver medal – second place	1993 Shanghai	10,000 m

Wang Xiuting (Chinese: 王秀婷; born 11 May 1965) is a Chinese former long-distance runner. She won the gold medal at the 1989 World 15km Road Race Championships, silver at the 1988 World 15 km Road Race Championships, and bronze in the 10,000 metres at the 1991 World Championships.

== Career ==
Born in Qingdao, Shandong province, Wang Xiuting rose to prominence with a victory in the 10,000 metres at the 1986 Asian Games in Seoul. She represented China in the long race at the 1987 IAAF World Cross Country Championships and came in 28th place. Wang made her track debut at the global level later that year at the 1987 World Championships in Athletics – she came seventh in the 10,000 m but didn't get past the heats of the 3000 metres. She took both the 5000 metres and 10,000 m crowns at the VI Chinese National Games at the end of the year. At the 1988 IAAF World Cross Country Championships she came fourteenth in the long race.

She made her Olympic debut at the 1988 Seoul Olympics, running in the heats of the 3000 m and taking seventh place in the 10,000 m final. She took the silver medal at that year's IAAF World Women's Road Race Championships, finishing behind Ingrid Kristiansen. She returned to the competition in 1989 and won the women's gold medal as well as a team title alongside Zhong Huandi. Her winning time of 49:34 was a Chinese record for the 15 km distance. Her 1990 season was highlighted by a silver medal in the 10,000 m at the 1990 Asian Games in Beijing, where she was beaten by Zhong.

The highlight of her career came at the 1991 World Championships in Athletics, where she won the 10,000 m bronze medal, finishing after Liz McColgan and Zhong. That December she won the Sanyo Half Marathon in Okayama, running a course record time of 1:10:14. She had her best Olympic performance the following year when she came sixth in the 10,000 m final at the 1992 Barcelona Olympics. Wang also set a marathon best of 2:28:56 at the Osaka International Ladies Marathon that year, where she finished in fifth place. Her final major appearances came in 1993: she was the runner-up at the Beijing Marathon behind Li Yemei, and won another 10,000 m silver behind Zhong, this time at the inaugural East Asian Games.

== International competitions ==
Year	Competition	Venue	Position	Event	Notes
Representing China
1986	Asian Games	Seoul, South Korea	1st	10,000 m	32:47.77
1987	World Cross Country Championships	Warsaw, Poland	28th		
1987	World Championships	Rome, Italy	16th (h)	3000 m	8:50.68
1987	World Championships	Rome, Italy	8th	10,000 m	31:48.88
1988	World Cross Country Championships	Auckland, New Zealand	14th		
1988	Olympic Games	Seoul, South Korea	19th (h)	3000 m	8:54.19
1988	Olympic Games	Seoul, South Korea	7th	10,000m	31:40.23
1988	World Road Race Championships	Adelaide, Australia	2nd	15 km	50:18
1989	World Road Race Championships	Rio de Janeiro, Brazil	1st	15 km	49:34
1990	Asian Games	Beijing, China	2nd	10,000 m	31:52.18
1991	World Championships	Tokyo, Japan	3rd	10,000 m	31:35.99
1992	Olympic Games	Barcelona, Spain	6th	10,000 m	31:28.06
(h) Indicates overall position in qualifying heats
