= Athletics at the 1996 Summer Olympics – Women's marathon =

Women's marathon at the Games of the XXVI Olympiad
- Venue: Centennial Olympic Stadium, Atlanta
- Dates: July 28
- Competitors: 86 from 51 nations
- Winning time: 2:26:05

Medalists
1st place, gold medalist(s)		Fatuma Roba	Ethiopia
2nd place, silver medalist(s)		Valentina Yegorova	Russia
3rd place, bronze medalist(s)		Yuko Arimori	Japan

The women's marathon at the 1996 Summer Olympics in Atlanta was held on Sunday July 28, 1996, beginning at 07:05h local time. Sixty-five athletes finished the race while twenty-one dropped out mid-competition. A total of 86 competitors from 51 countries took part. There were also two competitors, Valentina Enachi of Moldova and Virginie Gloum of the Central African Republic, whose results were deemed unofficial due to procedural errors by their federations in submitting their entries in the event.

== Medalists ==
Gold	Fatuma Roba; Ethiopia
Silver	Valentina Yegorova; Russia
Bronze	Yuko Arimori; Japan

== Abbreviations ==
- All times shown are in hours:minutes:seconds

DNS	did not start
NM	no mark
OR	olympic record
WR	world record
AR	area record
NR	national record
PB	personal best
SB	season best

== Records ==
Standing records prior to the 1996 Summer Olympics
World Record	Ingrid Kristiansen (NOR)	2:21:06	April 21, 1985	London, United Kingdom
Olympic Record	Joan Benoit (USA)	2:24:52	August 5, 1984	Los Angeles, United States
Season Best	Katrin Dörre (GER)	2:26:04	January 28, 1996	Osaka, Japan

== Final ranking ==
Place	Athlete	Time	Notes
1st place, gold medalist(s)	Fatuma Roba (ETH)	2:26:05	
2nd place, silver medalist(s)	Valentina Yegorova (RUS)	2:28:05	
3rd place, bronze medalist(s)	Yuko Arimori (JPN)	2:28:39	
4	Katrin Dörre-Heinig (GER)	2:28:45	
5	Rocío Ríos (ESP)	2:30:50	
6	Lidia Șimon (ROU)	2:31:04	
7	Manuela Machado (POR)	2:31:11	
8	Sonja Krolik (GER)	2:31:16	
9	Ren Xiujuan (CHN)	2:31:21	
10	Anne Marie Lauck (USA)	2:31:30	
11	Małgorzata Sobańska (POL)	2:31:52	
12	Izumi Maki (JPN)	2:32:35	
13	Ornella Ferrara (ITA)	2:33:09	
14	Mónica Pont (ESP)	2:33:27	
15	Angelina Kanana (KEN)	2:34:19	
16	Liz McColgan (GBR)	2:34:30	
17	Junko Asari (JPN)	2:34:31	
18	Franziska Rochat-Moser (SUI)	2:34:48	
19	Griselda González (ARG)	2:35:12	
20	Jong Song-ok (PRK)	2:35:31	
21	Irina Bogachova (KGZ)	2:35:44	
22	Iglandini González (COL)	2:35:45	
23	Serap Aktaş (TUR)	2:36:14	
24	Alena Mazouka (BLR)	2:36:22	
25	Marleen Renders (BEL)	2:36:27	
26	Kim Chang-ok (PRK)	2:36:31	
27	Albertina Dias (POR)	2:36:39	
28	Kerryn McCann (AUS)	2:36:41	
29	Aniela Nikiel (POL)	2:36:44	
30	Oh Mi-ja (KOR)	2:36:54	
31	Linda Somers (USA)	2:36:58	
32	Danuta Bartoszek (CAN)	2:37:06	
33	María del Carmen Díaz (MEX)	2:37:14	
34	Nelly Glauser (SUI)	2:37:19	
35	Ramilya Burangulova (RUS)	2:38:04	
36	Judit Nagy (HUN)	2:38:43	
37	Érika Olivera (CHI)	2:39:06	
38	Yvonne Danson (SIN)	2:39:18	
39	Márcia Narloch (BRA)	2:39:33	
40	Stefanija Statkuvienė (LTU)	2:39:51	
41	Anne van Schuppen (NED)	2:40:46	
42	Maria Polyzou (GRE)	2:41:33	
43	Guadaloupe Loma (MEX)	2:41:56	
44	Anuța Cătună (ROU)	2:42:01	
45	Karen MacLeod (GBR)	2:42:08	
46	Lorraine Moller (NZL)	2:42:21	
47	Albertina Machado (POR)	2:43:44	
48	Anita Håkenstad (NOR)	2:43:58	
49	Ana Isabel Alonso (ESP)	2:44:12	
50	Natalya Galushko (BLR)	2:44:21	
51	Adriana Fernández (MEX)	2:44:23	
52	May Allison (CAN)	2:44:38	
53	Helena Javornik (SLO)	2:46:58	
54	Marilú Salazar (PER)	2:48:58	
55	Suzana Ćirić (YUG)	2:49:30	
56	Nadia Prasad (FRA)	2:50:05	
57	Suzanne Malaxos (AUS)	2:50:46	
58	Suzanne Rigg (GBR)	2:52:09	
59	Elizabeth Mongudhi (NAM)	2:56:19	
60	Solange de Souza (BRA)	2:56:23	
61	Gulsara Dadabayeva (TJK)	3:09:08	
62	Bimala Ranamagar (NEP)	3:16:19	
63	Erkhemsaikhany Davaajargal (MGL)	3:19:06	
64	Sirivanh Khetavong (LAO)	3:25:16	
65	Marie Benito (GUM)	3:27:28	
DID NOT FINISH (DNF)
—	Madina Biktagirova (BLR)	DNF	
—	Joyce Chepchumba (KEN)	DNF	
—	Salina Chirchir (KEN)	DNF	
—	Maria Curatolo (ITA)	DNF	
—	Carmem de Oliveira (BRA)	DNF	
—	Carol Galea (MLT)	DNF	
—	Kamila Gradus (POL)	DNF	
—	Gang Sun-deok (KOR)	DNF	
—	Gitte Karlshøj (DEN)	DNF	
—	Lyubov Klochko (UKR)	DNF	
—	Lee Mi-gyeong (KOR)	DNF	
—	Kirsi Rauta (FIN)	DNF	
—	Elana Meyer (RSA)	DNF	
—	Lisa Ondieki (AUS)	DNF	
—	Uta Pippig (GER)	DNF	
—	Cristina Pomacu (ROU)	DNF	
—	Jane Salumäe (EST)	DNF	
—	Jenny Spangler (USA)	DNF	
—	Martha Tenorio (ECU)	DNF	
—	Maura Viceconte (ITA)	DNF	
—	Alla Zhilyaeva (RUS)	DNF	

== See also ==
- 1995 Women's World Championships Marathon
- 1996 Marathon Year Ranking
- 1997 Women's World Championships Marathon
