= Yoshiko Yamamoto =

Japanese long-distance runner

Personal information
- Born: 6 March 1970 (age 56) Japan

Sport
- Sport: Athletics
Medal record
Marathon
Representing Japan
World Marathon Majors
Gold medal – first place	1990 Paris	Marathon
Silver medal – second place	1992 Boston	Marathon
Bronze medal – third place	1992 New York City	Marathon

Yoshiko Yamamoto (Japanese: 山本佳子, born 6 March 1970) is a Japanese former marathon runner who won the 1990 Paris Marathon, came second at the 1992 Boston Marathon, and third at the 1992 New York City Marathon.

== Career ==
In 1989, Yamamoto came ninth at the Osaka International Ladies Marathon. In 1990, Yamamoto won the Paris Marathon. At the 1992 Boston Marathon, Yamamoto finished second in a time of 2:26:26. She was over 2 minutes, and over 0.5 miles (0.80 km) behind race winner Olga Markova. Her second place was the best result by a Japanese woman at the Boston Marathon, and her time of 2:26:26 tied the Japanese national marathon record. Yamamoto was not selected for the 1992 Summer Olympics in Barcelona, Spain. Later in the year, Yamamoto came third at the 1992 New York City Marathon in a time of 2:29:58.

Yamamoto came third at the 1993 Osaka International Ladies Marathon, and finished sixth at the 1995 Boston Marathon, in a time of 2:31:39.
