= Olga Markova =

Olga Markova may refer to:

- Olga Markova (runner) (born 1968), Russian former long-distance runner
- Olga Markova (figure skater) (born 1974), Russian retired figure skater
