= 1990 Berlin Marathon =

17th annual running

17th Berlin Marathon
- Venue: Berlin, West Germany
- Dates: 30 September 1990

Champions
- Men: Steve Moneghetti (2:08:16)
- Women: Uta Pippig (2:28:37)

The 1990 Berlin Marathon was the 17th running of the annual marathon race held in Berlin, West Germany, held on 30 September 1990. Australia's Steve Moneghetti won the men's race in 2:08:16 hours, while the women's race was won by East Germany's Uta Pippig in 2:28:37.

== Results ==
=== Men ===
Position	Athlete	Nationality	Time
1	Steve Moneghetti	Australia	2:08:16
2	Gidamis Shahanga	Tanzania	2:08.32
3	Jörg Peter	East Germany	2:09:23
4	Stephan Freigang	East Germany	2:09:45
5	Harri Hänninen	Finland	2:12:40
6	Kazuya Nishimoto	Japan	2:12:41
7	Herbert Steffny	West Germany	2:12:44
8	Hisatoshi Shintaku	Japan	2:12:49
9	Michael Heilmann	East Germany	2:13:12
10	Alfredo Shahanga	Tanzania	2:13:29

=== Women ===
Position	Athlete	Nationality	Time
1	Uta Pippig	East Germany	2:28:37
2	Renata Kokowska	Poland	2:28:50
3	Carla Beurskens	Netherlands	2:30:00
4	Anna Rybicka	Poland	2:33:16
5	Márcia Narloch	Brazil	2:33:57
6	Jane Welzel	United States	2:35:09
7	Bożena Dziubińska	Poland	2:35:25
8	Birgit Jerschabek	East Germany	2:36:20
9	Birgit Stephan	East Germany	2:37:23
10	Doris Grossert	West Germany	2:38:35
