= Athletics at the 1992 Summer Olympics – Women's 10,000 metres =

Women's 10,000 metres at the Games of the XXV Olympiad
- Venue: Estadi Olímpic de Montjuïc
- Dates: 1 August 1992 (heats); 7 August 1992 (final)
- Competitors: 48 from 33 nations
- Winning time: 31:06.02

Medalists
1st place, gold medalist(s)		Derartu Tulu; Ethiopia
2nd place, silver medalist(s)		Elana Meyer; South Africa
3rd place, bronze medalist(s)		Lynn Jennings; United States

Official Video

The official results of the Women's 10,000 metres at the 1992 Summer Olympics in Barcelona, Spain, with the final held on Friday August 7, 1992. Derartu Tulu became the first black African woman to win an Olympic Gold medal.

Liz McColgan came into the race as the returning silver medalist, the reigning world champion and a reputation behind it. Elana Meyer came from South Africa with long distance road records. She was considered a good chance to become the first African woman to win a gold medal. Zhong Huandi was the silver medalist behind McColgan in the world championships but not much was known about the Chinese program. The following year, they would scream their superiority at women's distance running, with Zhong running the second fastest 10,000 metres in history.

From the gun, McColgan assumed the lead and the rest of the field respected that. McColgan's pace dropped many runners but Meyer, Zhong, Hellen Kimaiyo and relatively unknown 20 year old Derartu Tulu led a small pack that stayed right behind McColgan. With 9 laps to go, Meyer, going around McColgan and running for daylight. The only one to chase was Tulu, quickly making up the gap and running in Meyer's shadow. Lynn Jennings made an attempt to follow but couldn't bridge the ever-widening gap. And so it stayed until the bell, Tulu made her break, Meyer didn't have the speed and the gold medal was settled. Tulu dropped the pace down to 67 seconds for the last lap, Meyer who had been running 73's ran another 73 taking silver by 8 seconds over Jennings who won the battle for bronze.

== Medalists ==
Gold	Derartu Tulu; Ethiopia
Silver	Elana Meyer; South Africa
Bronze	Lynn Jennings; United States

== Records ==
These were the standing world and Olympic records (in minutes) prior to the 1992 Summer Olympics.

World record	30:13.74	(Norway) Ingrid Kristiansen	Oslo (NOR)	July 5, 1986
Olympic record	31:05.21	(Soviet Union) Olga Bondarenko	Seoul (KOR)	September 30, 1988

== Final ==
RANK	FINAL	TIME
	Derartu Tulu (ETH)	31:06.02
	Elana Meyer (RSA)	31:11.75
	Lynn Jennings (USA)	31:19.89
4.	Zhong Huandi (CHN)	31:21.08
5.	Liz McColgan (GBR)	31:26.11
6.	Wang Xiuting (CHN)	31:28.06
7.	Uta Pippig (GER)	31:36.45
8.	Judi St. Hilaire (USA)	31:38.04
9.	Hellen Kimaiyo (KEN)	31:38.91
10.	Jill Hunter (GBR)	31:46.49
11.	Christien Toonstra (NED)	31:47.38
12.	Izumi Maki (JPN)	31:55.06
13.	Albertina Dias (POR)	32:03.93
14.	Miki Igarashi (JPN)	32:09.58
15.	Lieve Slegers (BEL)	32:14.17
16.	Rosanna Munerotto (ITA)	32:37.91
17.	Tegla Loroupe (KEN)	32:53.09
18.	Tigist Moreda (ETH)	34:05.56
—	Fernanda Marques (POR)	DNF
—	Conceição Ferreira (POR)	DNF

== Heats ==
RANK	HEAT 1	TIME
1.	Hellen Kimaiyo (KEN)	31:58.63
2.	Zhong Huandi (CHN)	32:04.46
3.	Liz McColgan (GBR)	32:07.25
4.	Uta Pippig (GER)	32:07.28
5.	Christien Toonstra (NED)	32:07.42
6.	Izumi Maki (JPN)	32:07.91
7.	Judi St. Hilaire (USA)	32:13.99
8.	Tigist Moreda (ETH)	32:14.42
9.	Conceição Ferreira (POR)	32:15.05
10.	Rosanna Munerotto (ITA)	32:17.01
11.	Carole Rouillard (CAN)	32:52.83
12.	Marcianne Mukamurenzi (RWA)	33:00.66
13.	Gwynneth Coogan (USA)	33:13.13
14.	Rosario Murcia (FRA)	33:16.96
15.	Dorthe Rasmussen (DEN)	33:22.43
16.	Lyudmila Matveyeva (EUN)	33:23.02
17.	Martha Tenorio (ECU)	34:29.03
18.	Hiromi Suzuki (JPN)	34:29.64
19.	Carmem de Oliveira (BRA)	34:48.21
20.	Rosemary Turare (PNG)	42:02.79
—	Olga Bondarenko (EUN)	DNF
—	Véronique Collard (BEL)	DNF
—	Anita Klapote (LAT)	DNF
—	Päivi Tikkanen (FIN)	DNF
—	A. Gutierrez Wittmann (ISV)	DNS

RANK	HEAT 2	TIME
1.	Derartu Tulu (ETH)	31:55.67
2.	Elana Meyer (RSA)	32:05.45
3.	Lynn Jennings (USA)	32:18.06
4.	Jill Hunter (GBR)	32:18.34
5.	Wang Xiuting (CHN)	32:31.91
6.	Albertina Dias (POR)	32:31.95
7.	Tegla Loroupe (KEN)	32:34.07
8.	Fernanda Marques (POR)	32:38.16
9.	Lieve Slegers (BEL)	32:40.59
10.	Miki Igarashi (JPN)	32:45.47
11.	Susan Hobson (AUS)	32:53.61
12.	Annette Sergent (FRA)	32:57.29
13.	Kerstin Preßler (GER)	33:17.88
14.	Lydia Cheromei (KEN)	33:34.05
15.	Suzana Ciric (IOP)	33:42.26
16.	María Luisa Servín (MEX)	33:42.74
17.	Lesley Morton (NZL)	33:51.06
18.	Lisa Harvey (CAN)	33:55.93
19.	Andri Avraam (CYP)	34:06.66
20.	Griselda González (ARG)	34:09.42
21.	Luchia Yeshak (ETH)	34:12.16
22.	Andrea Wallace (GBR)	34:29.47
—	Yelena Zhupiyeva-Vyazova (EUN)	DNF
—	Kathrin Ullrich (GER)	DNF
—	Silvia Cortez Tancara (BOL)	DNS

== See also ==
- 1988 Women's Olympic 10,000 metres (Seoul)
- 1990 Women's European Championships 10,000 metres (Split)
- 1991 Women's World Championships 10,000 metres (Tokyo)
- 1993 Women's World Championships 10,000 metres (Stuttgart)
- 1994 Women's European Championships 10,000 metres (Helsinki)
- 1995 Women's World Championships 10,000 metres (Gothenburg)
- 1996 Women's Olympic 10,000 metres (Atlanta)
