= Izumi Maki =

Izumi Maki may refer to:

- Izumi Maki (Nadesico), appearing in Martian Successor Nadesico
- Izumi Maki (athlete) (1968–2018), Japanese long-distance runner, winner of Nagoya Marathon 1996
- Natsumi Yanase (born 1971), a.k.a. Izumi Maki, Japanese voice actress of adult games
