= Jane Salumäe =

Estonian long-distance runner

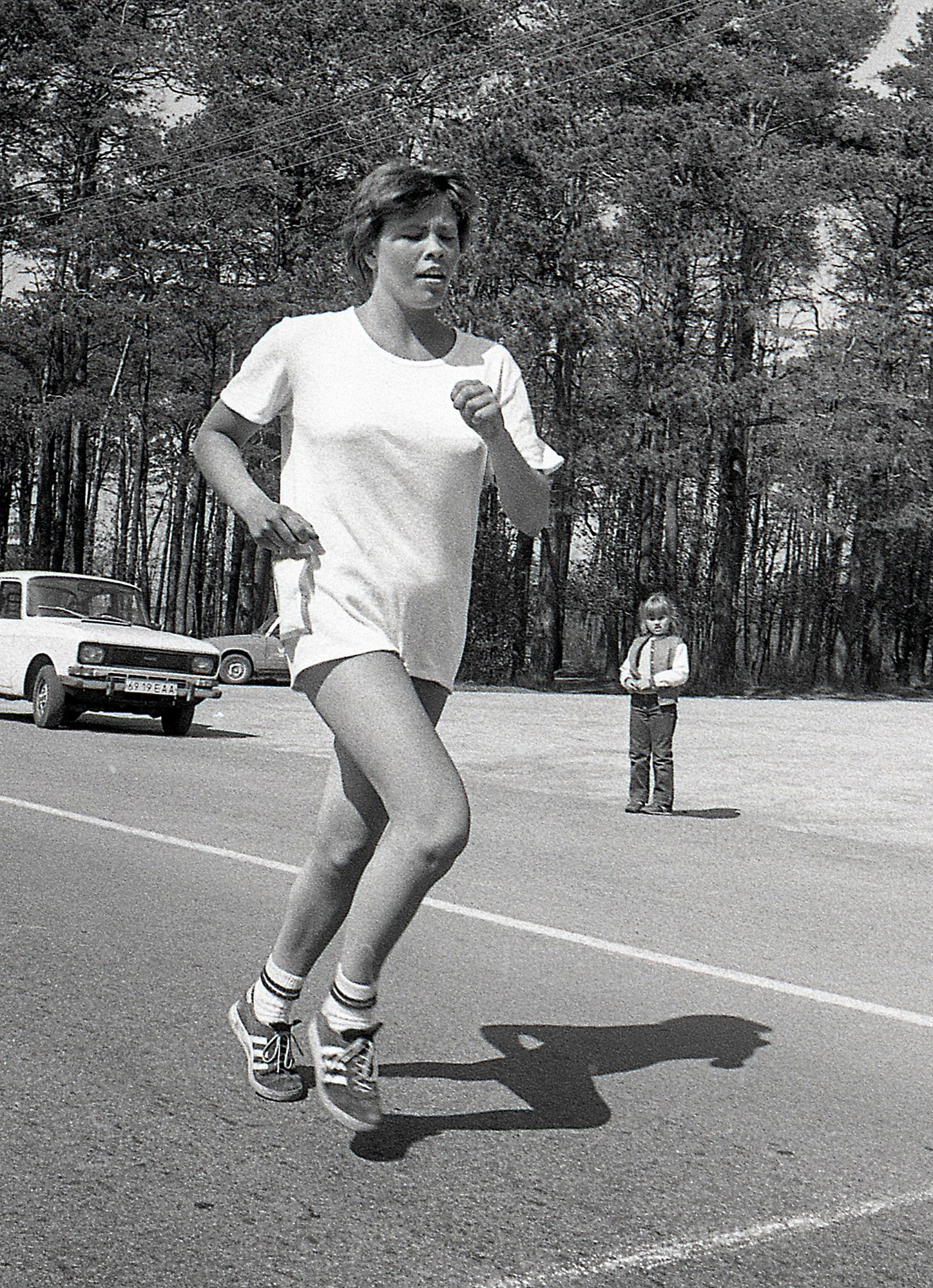
Jane Salumäe (1988)

Jane Salumäe (born 17 January 1968, in Tallinn) is a retired Estonian female long-distance runner, who twice competed in the Summer Olympics (1996 and 2004).

== Biography ==
She set her personal best (2:27:04) in the marathon on May 11, 1997 in Turin.

== Achievements ==
Year	Competition	Venue	Position	Event	Result
Representing Estonia
1994	City-Pier-City Loop	The Hague, Netherlands	1st	Half Marathon	1:10:10
1994	European Championships	Helsinki, Finland	26th	Marathon	2:42:02
1995	World Championships	Gothenburg, Sweden	14th	Marathon	2:35:53
1995	Italian Marathon	Carpi, Italy	1st	Marathon	2:32:22
1996	City-Pier-City Loop	The Hague, Netherlands	1st	Half Marathon	1:11:38
1996	Olympic Games	Atlanta, United States	—	Marathon	DNF
1997	Turin Marathon	Turin, Italy	1st	Marathon	2:27:04
1997	Rome City Marathon	Rome, Italy	1st	Marathon	2:31:41
1997	World Championships	Athens, Greece	—	Marathon	DNF
1998	Monaco Marathon	Monte Carlo, Monaco	1st	Marathon	2:32:55
1999	World Championships	Seville, Spain	30th	Marathon	2:41:50
2000	Los Angeles Marathon	Los Angeles, United States	1st	Marathon	2:33:33
2001	Vienna Marathon	Vienna, Austria	1st	Marathon	2:30:00
2001	Madrid Half Marathon	Madrid, Spain	1st	Half-Marathon	1:13:20
2002	European Championships	Munich, Germany	4th	Marathon	2:33:46
2003	World Championships	Paris, France	47th	Marathon	2:39:36
2004	Olympic Games	Athens, Greece	44th	Marathon	2:48:47

Awards
Preceded by Kristina Šmigun	Estonian Sportswoman of the Year; 1998	Succeeded by Kristina Šmigun
