= Linda Somers =

American long-distance runner

Personal information
- Nationality: American
- Born: May 7, 1961 (age 65) Bitburg, Germany
- Height: 1.63 m (5 ft 4 in)
- Weight: 47.5 kg (105 lb)

Sport
- Country: USA
- Events: Cross country, Marathon
- Team: Asics Aggies
- Turned pro: 1984

Achievements and titles
- Olympic finals: 1996, Marathon, 31st
- World finals: 1995, Marathon, 7th
- National finals: 1993, Marathon, 1st 1994, Marathon, 1st

Linda Somers-Smith (born May 7, 1961, in Bitburg Air Force Base, Rhineland-Palatinate) is an American long-distance runner who is a two-time United States national champion in the marathon. Somers competed in the marathon at the 1996 Summer Olympics. She also won the 1992 Chicago Marathon (2:37:41) and the 1993 California International Marathon (2:34:11). Somers is notable as she is one of the very few athletes who has continued running at the elite level since she turned Pro in 1984 into the transition to Masters athlete. She continues to win and place in open competition, even at the age of 50, all the while as a practicing attorney.

She has run in seven US Olympic Trials Marathons and in the 2008 Boston venue she set the United States 45-49 age group record (2:38:49)* placing 17th. She continues to show impressive results, placing sixth in the Open US Club Nationals Cross Country meet in 2009* (Lexington, Kentucky), and setting age group road records in the 5K (16:14, San Jose 11/26/2009)*, the 10k (33:39, Paso Robles, California 9/26/2010), 10 Miles (57:07 Redding, California 3/6/2010) and the Half Marathon (1:13:32, Rock 'n Roll San Jose Half Marathon, California 10/3/2010).

Somers qualified for her seventh consecutive US Olympic Trials A Standard, a record number, while winning the Masters title (sixth place overall finish ) in the 2010 Los Angeles Marathon (2:36:33). On January 14, 2012, at the age of 50, she finished in 28th place at the USA Olympic Trials Marathon in Houston with a time of 2:37:36, another American Age Group Record.

Somers was inducted into the Road Runners Club of America (RRCA) Hall of Fame on March 17, 2012. Later in 2012 she was inducted into the USATF Masters Hall of Fame.

== US road running records ==
=== Age 45+ ===
- 5 km – 16:14 (November 2009)
- 10 miles – 57:09 (March 2010)
- 20 km – 69:42 (October 2010)
- Half-marathon – 73:32 (October 2010)
- 30 km – 1:52:44 (April 2008)

=== Age 50+ ===
- World age 50+ Half-marathon record – 75:18 (October 2011)
- Marathon – 2:37:36 (January 2012)

As of 2017

== Achievements ==
Year	Competition	Venue	Position	Event	Notes
Representing the United States
1992	Houston Marathon (US Olympic Trial)	Houston, United States	16th	Marathon	2:39:50
1992	Chicago Marathon	Chicago, United States	1st	Marathon	2:37:41
1993	California International Marathon	Sacramento, United States	1st	Marathon	2:34:11
1994	Grandma's Marathon	Duluth, United States	1st	Marathon	2:33:42
1995	World Championships	Gothenburg, Sweden	7th	Marathon	2:32:12
1996	US Olympic Trial	Columbia, United States	2nd	Marathon	2:30:06 (PB)
1996	Olympic Games	Atlanta, United States	31st	Marathon	2:36:58
2004	US Olympic Trial	St Louis, United States	10th	Marathon	2:37:28
2008	US Olympic Trial	Boston, United States	17th	Marathon	2:38:49
2012	US Olympic Trial	Houston, United States	28th	marathon	2:37:36
