= Jenny Lund (runner) =

Australian long-distance runner (born 1961)

Personal information
- Nationality: Australian
- Born: July 11, 1961 (age 64)

Sport
- Sport: Long-distance running

Jenny Lund (born 11 July 1961) is a retired Australian long-distance runner.

At the 1990 Commonwealth Games she finished eighth in the 3000 metres and seventh in the 10,000 metres. She competed at the 1991 World Championships in both 3000 and 10,000 metres without reaching the final in either event. She also competed in most editions of the World Cross Country Championships from 1985 through 1992, her best placements being 24th from 1990 and 14th from 1991.
