= Mónica Pont =

Spanish long-distance runner (born 1969)

Personal information
- Born: 3 June 1969 (age 57) Bufali, Valencia, Spain

Sport
- Sport: Marathon running

Mónica Pont Chafer (born 3 June 1969) is a Spanish former long-distance runner. She won the Rotterdam Marathon on 13 April 1995, clocking 2:30:34. She represented her native country at the 1996 Summer Olympics in the women's marathon race, where she finished in 14th place.

Pont set her personal best (2:27:53) in the classic distance in the 1996 Osaka International Ladies Marathon. Her time from that event was then the second-best Spanish women's marathon time recorded, and it remains the Valencian record. Pont also set the Valencian record for the half-marathon in an event in Barcelona 1996, at 1:12:27, and held it for 22 years until Marta Esteban broke it in 2017.

Pont Chafer is now an agent for elite athletes, especially from Ethiopia and Kenya.

== Achievements ==
| Year | Competition | Venue | Position | Event | Notes |
Representing Spain
| 1995 | Rotterdam Marathon | Rotterdam, Netherlands | 1st | Marathon | 2:30:34 |
| 1995 | World Championships | Gothenburg, Sweden | 6th | Marathon | 2:31:53 |
| 1996 | Olympic Games | Atlanta, United States | 14th | Marathon | 2:33:27 |
