= Rosario Murcia =

French long-distance runner (born 1964)

Personal information
- Born: 23 September 1964 (age 61) Lyon, France
- Height: 1.60 m (5 ft 3 in)
- Weight: 44 kg (97 lb)

Sport
- Sport: Athletics
- Events: 5000 m, 10,000 m
- Club: ASU Bron

Rosario Murcia-Gangloff (born 23 September 1964 in Lyon) is a retired French athlete who competed in long-distance events. She represented her country at the 1992 Summer Olympics as well as three outdoor and one indoor World Championships.

== Competition record ==
| Year | Competition | Venue | Position | Event | Notes |
Representing France
| 1987 | Mediterranean Games | Latakia, Syria | 3rd | 3000 m | 9:13.24 |
| 1989 | Jeux de la Francophonie | Casablanca, Morocco | 8th | 3000 m | 9:28.63 |
| 1990 | European Championships | Split, Yugoslavia | 20th | 10,000 m | 33:44.44 |
| 1991 | World Indoor Championships | Seville, Spain | 6th | 3000 m | 8:56.20 |
| 1991 | World Championships | Tokyo, Japan | 33rd (h) | 10,000 m | 32:49.75 |
| 1992 | Olympic Games | Barcelona, Spain | 26th (h) | 10,000 m | 33:16.96 |
| 1993 | World Championships | Stuttgart, Germany | 18th | 10,000 m | 32:54.65 |
| 1993 | World Half Marathon Championships | Brussels, Belgium | 42nd | Half marathon | 1:14:36 |
| 1994 | European Championships | Helsinki, Finland | 29th | Marathon | 2:43:15 |
| 1995 | World Championships | Gothenburg, Sweden | 24th (h) | 5000 m | 15:41.73 |

== Personal bests ==
Outdoor

- 1500 metres – 4:15.77 (Annecy 1987)
- 3000 metres – 8:52.20 (Nice 1995)
- 5000 metres – 15:25.33 (Saint-Denis 1995)
- 10,000 metres – 31:42.83 (Lommel 1992)
- 10 kilometres – 36:25 (Dax 2005)
- Half marathon – 1:13:24 (Nice 1999)
- Marathon – 2:42:32 (Reims 1998)
- 3000 metres steeplechase – 10:44.54 (Saint-Étienne 2001)

Indoor

- 3000 metres – 8:56.20 (Seville 1991)
