= Anita Klapote =

Latvian long-distance runner

Personal information
- Nationality: Latvian
- Born: 5 September 1967 (age 58) Riga, Latvian SSR, Soviet Union

Sport
- Sport: Long-distance running
- Event: 10,000 metres

Anita Klapote (born 5 September 1967) is a Latvian long-distance runner. She competed in the women's 10,000 metres at the 1992 Summer Olympics.
