= Carole Rouillard =

Canadian long-distance runner

Carole Rouillard (born March 15, 1960, in Montreal, Quebec) is a Canadian retired long-distance runner, who represented her country twice in the women's 10,000 metres at the Summer Olympics, starting in 1988 (Seoul, South Korea). She won the gold medal in the women's marathon at the 1994 Commonwealth Games.

== Achievements ==
Year	Competition	Venue	Position	Event	Notes
Representing Canada
1988	Olympic Games	Seoul, South Korea	16th	10,000 m	32:41.43
1986	Commonwealth Games	Edinburgh, United Kingdom	8th	10,000 m	33:22.31
1990	Commonwealth Games	Auckland, New Zealand	4th	10,000 m	32:49.36
1991	World Championships	Tokyo, Japan	18th	10,000 m	32:58.77
1992	Olympic Games	Barcelona, Spain	24th	10,000 m	32:52.83
1994	Jeux de la Francophonie	Paris, France	3rd	10,000 m	34:43.96
1994	Commonwealth Games	Victoria, British Columbia, Canada	1st	Marathon	2:30:41
1995	World Championships	Gothenburg, Sweden	—	Marathon	DNF
