= Jane Welzel =

American long-distance runner

Personal information
- Nationality: American
- Born: 24 April 1955
- Died: 31 August 2014 (aged 59)

Sport
- Sport: Athletics
- Event: Long-distance running

Achievements and titles
- Personal best: Marathon: 2:33:01
Medal record
Women's athletics
Representing United States
World Athletics Championships
1988 Adelaide, Australia	15K
1989 Rio de Janeiro, Brazil	15K
1992 Tyneside, United Kingdom	Half Marathon
1993 Stuttgart, Germany	Marathon
1993 San Sebastián, Spain	Marathon
1994 Oslo, Norway	Half Marathon

Jane Welzel (born April 24, 1955, d. Aug. 31, 2014) was a pioneering long-distance runner who advocated for women to be added to the sport.

In 1990, she became the U.S. Marathon Champion when she ran 2:33:35 at Grandma's Marathon in Minnesota. Her career spanned decades. She competed in five U.S. Olympic Trials Marathons and won more than 50 major races. She was selected to represent America at the 1988 and 1989 World Road Racing Championships as well as several World Championship races: the 1992 Half Marathon, the 1993 Marathon, the 1993 Marathon Cup, and the 1994 Half Marathon.

== Early career ==
Welzel grew up in Hopkinton, Massachusetts, the city that hosts the start of the Boston Marathon. She graduated from Hopkinton High School in 1973.

She attended University of Massachusetts and competed on the swim team, joining the water polo team as well. However, a problem with the pool facilities canceled practices during one season, and Welzel tried training with the nascent college cross country team. She won her first race and decided to stick with the sport, where she competed with many other pioneering female runners such as Joan Benoit. She would spend three years in cross country, and two years on the track and field team. Her cross country team finished in the top 10 at the AIAW National Championship in 1975.

In the middle of her college career, the age of 20, she trained for Boston, plodding 30–40 miles a week, never going past 10 miles for a run. On the day of the 1975 marathon, she entered the starting crowd, not realizing there was a qualification requirement. She ran as a bandit and finished around 3:35, somewhere in the top-30 women.

She would advance in the marathon distance, and in 1979, she won the Nittany Valley Marathon in State College, Pennsylvania. She ran a 2:41:07 in Louisiana in 1980. Four times she tried to break the 2:40 barrier. Then in 1983, at age 28, she took the lead from the start and won the Philadelphia Marathon by eight minutes in 2:36:38, a personal best time. She was present at the first U.S. Olympic Trials Marathon, and ran with the fastest women in the nation to finish 14th in 2:35:53.

=== Accident ===
Jane Welzel and her husband were driving from Hamilton, New Zealand, to Auckland, New Zealand, while on vacation in 1984. On the way, their vehicle swerved on a gravel road and flipped into a cow pasture. The top of the car was crushed, and Welzel was trapped in the wreckage. He neck was broken. She survived, but spend several weeks strapped to a specialized bed that limited movement before being put into a full-body plaster cast for two months. For nearly three years, she persisted in regaining movement, then fitness, then competitive form.

By the 1988 Olympic Trials Marathon, she had fully recovered and was a contender to win the race. She had qualified with a 2:42 time at the Twin Cities Marathon. She showed that she was back to form by finishing 13th in the trials in 2:36:08, prompting Runner's World to call her the "Comeback Runner of the Year."

== Return to running ==
Welzel ran the 1990 Boston Marathon, finishing in 11th. In 1991, she was 10th. She was the first American woman in 1992 and 10th overall.

She was the 1990 U.S. Champion in the marathon when she won the Grandma's Marathon (named for the sponsor, Grandma's Restaurant) in a personal best time of 2:33:25. The day was muggy and warm, and participants described struggling in the high heat index. Welzel went out faster than local favorite Janice Ettle, then caught Minnesotan Janis Klecker at the halfway mark. Welzel credited her training in Colorado with the ability to hold the lead to the finish.

She raced to 6th place against international competition in the 1990 Berlin Marathon, in which she outran East Germans such as Birgit Jerschabek. She was sponsored by Reebok at the time. Welzel's father Hank, who had escaped Berlin in the late 1940s, returned to the city for the first time to see his daughter's race.

In 1992, she finished 10th at the Boston Marathon just after running to 9th place at the 1992 Olympic Trials Marathon in 2:35:55 during the hot and humid weather Houston provided.

She returned to Grandma's Marathon on the North Shore in June. Dueling with Gail Hall and Elena Semenova of Ukraine, she passed each and won in 2:33:01. It was the second-fastest time ever recorded for a woman on the course from Two Harbors, Minnesota to Duluth.

She ran the World Half Marathon Championships in England, placing 43rd in 1:13:30.

In the 1993 World Championships in Stuttgart, Germany, Welzel lined up in the morning heat and humidity, bracing for a hot race that went to the middle of the day. As her U.S. teammate Kimberly Rosenquist-Jones led athletes in the first laps inside the German "Neckarstadium," Welzel tucked into the pack. Paces were slow as predicted, and Junko Asari won. Jones finished 8th and Welzel finished 19th.

Welzel trained for the U.S. National Championship 25K, which brought her to Grand Rapids, Michigan's Old Kent River Bank Run. The race featured many of the fastest in the U.S., and Alfredo Vigueras (who had just gained citizenship), was eyeing the men's championship. After the gun, Jerry Lawson led the crowd as crushing winds slowed the pace. For 10 miles, Welzel ran with Lorraine Hochella. Then Welzel drafted off a few men to gain ground, which she kept. Vigueras caught Lawson to win for the men, and it was Welzel for the women in 1:29:47—a national record for master's women runners.

She qualified for and ran the 1996 U.S. Olympic Marathon Trials in Columbia, South Carolina. During the Feb. 10 race, Jenny Spangler won and Welzel finished 88th in 2:53:40. In September of the same year, she won the City of Lakes 25K.

At the 2000 Trials, Welzel was one of four women to compete for the fifth time. The others were Julie Peterson, Beverly Docherty and Janice Ettle. Welzel finished 126th in 3:04:44 while Christine Clark took the win.

She found more success in Master's categories (runners over 40 years old), winning dozens of 10Ks (such as the '97 Indy Grand Masters Prix and Sacramento's Avon Running 10K in '99). She set two U.S. records for women over 40 years old, one in the 5K and one in the 25K. She finished 15th at the Fifth Third River Bank Run in both 2002 and 2003, and was top 30 in a return to Grandma's Marathon in 2003 at the age of 48, still clocking a sub-three-hour marathon.

Later in life, she became the race director of competitions in the Fort Collins, Colorado, area.

== Personal life ==
Jane Welzel grew up around marathon culture in the town of Hopkinton, Massachusetts, with her four siblings. Her father Hank grew up in Germany, then refused to fight for the Nazis, escaped to America, lived in a POW camp in Alabama, was sent back to East Germany, then escaped again (with U.S. help) to Hopkinton.

Jane Welzel married Steve Liggett. They met at University of Massachusetts. Welzel was a professional counselor, specializing in eating disorders, couples counseling, personal growth, and sports psychology.

Jane served at a coach in Massachusetts and Penn State.

After studying at, competing for, and coaching in the University of Massachusetts, Welzel was inducted to their Hall of Fame.

She spent the majority of her running career living in Colorado (moving there in 1989) and was included on the Colorado Running Hall of Fame in 2013. Two years later, she was inducted into the USATF Masters Hall of Fame.

She died at 59 after a short battle with pancreatic cancer.

In 1995, she was quoted as saying "For me, running is like a metaphor for life. You put yourself on the line, see what you can do. There are things in running you usually don't have a chance to face otherwise. It gives you strength in other areas."

== Achievements ==
Year	Competition	Venue	Position	Event	Notes
Representing United States
1979	Freihofer's Run for Women	Albany, New York	2nd	10K	34:50
1980	Bonne Bell Mini Marathon	Washington D.C.	1st	10K	35:38
1981	Freihofer's Run for Women	Albany, New York	2nd	10K	36:36
1982	Avon Half Marathon	New York City, New York	1st	Half marathon	1:15:44
1983	Philadelphia Marathon	Philadelphia, Pennsylvania	1st	Marathon	2:36:38
1988	Hokkaido Marathon	Sapporo, Japan	1st	Marathon	2:40:53
1988	World Road Race Championships	Adelaide, Australia	35th	15K	53:31
1989	City of Lakes	Minneapolis, Minnesota	1st	25K	1:28:27
1989	World Road Race Championships	Rio de Janeiro, Brazil	17th	15K	52:44
1990	Boston Marathon	Boston, Massachusetts	11th	Marathon	2:42:04
1990	USA Marathon Championships at Grandma's Marathon	Duluth, Minnesota	1st	Marathon	2:33:35
1990	Berlin Marathon	Berlin, Germany	6th	Marathon	2:35:09
1991	San Francisco Marathon	San Francisco, California	2nd	Marathon	2:37:57
1992	Boston Marathon	Boston, Massachusetts	10th	Marathon	2:36:21
1992	Grandma's Marathon	Duluth, Minnesota	1st	Marathon	2:33:01
1992	World Half Marathon Championships	Newcastle, United Kingdom	43rd	Half marathon	1:13:30
1992	New York City Marathon	New York City, New York	14th	Marathon	2:41:22
1993	Boston Marathon	Boston, Massachusetts	11th	Marathon	2:39:38
1993	World Championships	Stuttgart, Germany	19th	Marathon	2:46:08
1993	IAAF World Marathon Cup	San Sebastián, Spain	25th	Marathon	2:37:53
1994	Las Vegas Mini Marathon	Las Vegas, Nevada	1st	Half marathon	1:13:54
1994	World Half Marathon Championships	Oslo, Norway	61st	Half marathon	1:15:24
1996	City of Lakes	Minneapolis, Minnesota	1st	25K	1:31:58
1996	Amway River Bank Run	Grand Rapids, Michigan	1st	25K	1:29:47
