= Gang Sun-deok =

South Korean long-distance runner

Personal information
- Nationality: South Korean
- Born: 29 October 1974 (age 51)

Sport
- Sport: Long-distance running
- Event: Marathon

Gang Sun-deok (born 29 October 1974) is a South Korean long-distance runner. She competed in the women's marathon at the 1996 Summer Olympics.

Gang started track and field as a 1500 metres runner in 1990 while in middle school. She began to run longer distances in the mid-1990s. While training primarily for the 5000 m and 10,000 m, she won the 1995 Chosun Ilbo Chuncheon International Marathon with a time of 2:35:37. She qualified for the 1996 Summer Olympics the following year, but withdrew midway through that race. She set a Korean record in the 5000 m in 1997, but retired from professional competition the following year due to a muscle injury. She got married in 2000, had a child, and returned as an athlete in 2004. In January 2006, she set a new South Korean record in the 3M Women's Half Marathon held in Austin, Texas.
