= Valentina Tauceri =

Italian runner (born 1966)

Personal information
- Nationality: Italian
- Born: 20 July 1966 (age 60) Trieste, Italy

Sport
- Country: Italy
- Sport: Athletics
- Event: Middle-distance running

Achievements and titles
- Personal bests: 800 m: 2:04.85 (1988); 1000 m: 2:45.81 (1986); 3000 m: 8:53.36 (1993); 5000 m: 15:31.19 (1993)
Medal record
Mediterranean Games
Gold medal – first place	1993 Narbonne	3000 m

Valentina Tauceri (born 20 July 1966 in Trieste) is a former female middle- and long-distance runner from Italy.

== Biography ==
She is best known for winning the gold medal in the women's 3000 metres at the 1993 Mediterranean Games in Narbonne, France. Tauceri set her personal best (15:31.19) in the 5000 m on 13 June 1993 in Arzignano. She has 24 caps in national team from 1985 to 1999.

== Achievements ==
Year	Competition	Venue	Position	Notes	
1990	European Indoor Championships	Glasgow, United Kingdom	7th	3000 metres	9:11.20

== National titles ==
Valentina Tauceri has won 4 times the individual national championship.

- 1 win in the 3000 metres (1993)
- 5 wins in the 1500 metres indoor (1987, 1988)
- 1 win in the cross country running (1997)
