= Delilah Asiago =

Kenyan long-distance runner (born 1972)

Delilah Asiago (born 24 February 1972) is a retired female athlete from Kenya. She specialized in long-distance running, including marathons.

She was banned for two years after she tested positive for doping during the 1999 Saint Silvester Race. Nevertheless, she was still active in 2006 when she won the Dubai Marathon.

Asiago holds 4-Mile and 12-Kilometer road running world records. She was awarded the "Road Racer of the Year" prize in 1995 by Running Times.

== International competitions ==
Representing Kenya
Year	Competition	Venue	Position	Event	Notes
1991	All-Africa Games	Cairo, Egypt	3rd	3000 m	
1991	World Championships	Tokyo, Japan	12th	10,000 m	
1995	All-Africa Games	Harare, Zimbabwe	2nd	10,000 m	

== Road races ==
- 1995 - Falmouth Road Race, 1st
- 1995 - Steamboat Classic, 1st (time 19:28, a 4-Mile world record)
- 1995 - Bay to Breakers, 1st, (time 38:23, a 12-km world record)
- 2002 - Great Lake Marathon, 1st
- 2003 - Nairobi Marathon, 2nd
- 2004 - Rotterdam Marathon, 6th (time 2:37:24, her personal record)
- 2005 - Nairobi Marathon, 6th
- 2006 - Dubai Marathon, 1st
- 2006 - Salt Lake City Marathon, 3rd

== See also ==
- List of doping cases in athletics
