= Alejandro Cruz (runner) =

Mexican runner

Personal information
- Born: February 10, 1968 (age 58) Mexico City, Mexico
Medal record
Representing Mexico
World Marathon Majors
Gold medal – first place	1988 Chicago	Marathon

Alejandro Cruz (born February 10, 1968) is a Mexican former marathoner and civil engineer. He competed during the 1980s to 2000s in the World Marathon Majors. He won the 1988 Chicago Marathon with a time of 2:08:57. At the age of twenty, Cruz's 1988 win made him the youngest man and first Mexican to win the Chicago Marathon. In later Chicago Marathons, Cruz placed fourth in 1994 and did not finish the 1998 edition.

Cruz also finished 4th at the 1991 Boston Marathon and 23rd at the 1993 New York City Marathon. At other marathon events, Cruz placed 5th at the 1995 Summer Universiade and 42nd at the 1999 World Championships in Athletics. In overall points, Cruz was first in the 1993 Runner's World men's rankings based on his 1992 race finishes. Cruz continued to run primarily in North America until his last marathon in 2009.

== Biography ==
Cruz was born in Mexico City, Mexico, on February 10, 1968. As a child, he played association football before becoming a runner at the age of seventeen. For his races, Cruz competed in multiple disciplines ranging from 10 km to the marathon.

Cruz started his marathon career in Mexico before entering his first American marathons in 1988. During an Olympic trial for Mexico in 1988, Cruz finished sixth at the Los Angeles Marathon. Later that year, Cruz was chosen to join the six-runner Mexican contingent as an emergency backup for Mauricio Gonzalez for the 1988 Chicago Marathon. González could not compete in the event due to injury. At the time, Cruz was studying at the University of Mexico for a civil engineering degree.

Cruz won the 1988 Chicago Marathon with a time of 2:08:57. He became the youngest man to win the Chicago Marathon and set the fastest time for a twenty-year old in any marathon. He was also the first-ever person from Mexico to win the Chicago Marathon. Cruz later reappeared at Chicago in 1994 and finished in 4th place. He also entered the 1998 edition but did not finish the event.

In other World Marathon Majors, Cruz competed at the Boston Marathon and New York City Marathon between 1991 and 2000. His best results were a 4th-place finish at the 1991 Boston Marathon and 23rd at the 1993 New York City Marathon. Outside of the World Marathon Majors, Cruz was 5th at the marathon event in the 1995 Summer Universiade. Cruz also ran in the marathon at the 1999 World Championships in Athletics and finished the race in 42nd place.

While primarily running in North America, Cruz travelled to various places for his races including Puerto Rico, Japan, and Guatemala. Cruz continued to run in marathons until 2009. Overall, Cruz was first in points for the 1993 Runner's World men's open rankings based on his 1992 race results.

== Other activities ==
Cruz worked as a civil engineer in the 2000s and planned to start a master's degree in math. Cruz was married and had one child.
