= Miki Igarashi =

Japanese long-distance runner

Miki Igarashi (五十嵐 美紀, Igarashi Miki; born August 22, 1971 in Gunma, Japan) is a retired Japanese female long-distance runner. She represented Japan at the 1992 Summer Olympics, finishing in 14th place in the women's 10,000 metres. She set her personal best (31.45.82) in the event in 1994.

== Biography ==
- In 1988, she set a new section record of 19 minutes 31 seconds in the 2nd section (6 km) of the East Japan Women's Ekiden
- Participated in the 1991 World Championships in Athletics in Tokyo . 16th place in the women's 10,000m final (32 minutes 44.62 seconds)

== Achievements ==
Year	Competition	Venue	Position	Event	Notes
Representing Japan
1991	World Championships	Tokyo, Japan	16th	10,000 m	32:44.62
1995	World Championships	Gothenburg, Sweden	11th	Marathon	2:34:34
