= Marcos Barreto =

Mexican long-distance runner

Personal information
- Full name: Marcos Barreto Luis
- Nationality: Mexican
- Born: 25 April 1960 (age 66)
- Height: 1.77 m (5 ft 10 in)
- Weight: 63 kg (139 lb)

Sport
- Sport: Long-distance running
- Events: 5000 and 10000 metres
Medal record
Men's Athletics
Representing Mexico
Central American and Caribbean Games
Silver medal – second place	1986 Santiago de los Caballeros	5000m
Silver medal – second place	1990 Mexico City	5000m

Marcos Barreto Luis (born 25 April 1960) is a Mexican long-distance runner. He competed in the men's 5000 metres at the 1988 Summer Olympics.

He she silver medal in the 5000m at the 1986 Central American and Caribbean Games in Santiago de los Caballeros and four years later again at the 1990 Central American and Caribbean Games in Mexico City. He won the Gasparilla Distance Classic in 1987 and 1988.
