= Tani Ruckle =

Australian long-distance runner

Tani Ruckle (born 25 June 1962) is a Canadian-born former long-distance runner who represented Australia. She ran her career-best time for the marathon with 2:31:19 for fourth at the 1988 Chicago Marathon. That performance moved her to second on the Australian all-time list behind Lisa Martin, and as of 2018, ranks her 12th. She won a silver medal in the marathon at the 1990 Commonwealth Games. She also finished ninth at the 1988 World 15 km Road Race Championships.

She was born in Vancouver, British Columbia.

== Competition record ==
Year	Competition	Venue	Position	Notes
Representing Australia
1985	Australian Marathon	Sydney, Australia	6th	2:50:03
1985	Melbourne Marathon	Melbourne, Australia	4th	2:48:36
1986	Philippine Air Lines Marathon	Manila, Philippines	1st	2:46:58
1986	Melbourne Marathon	Melbourne, Australia	1st	2:36:06
1987	Australian Marathon	Sydney, Australia	1st	2:37:53
1988	World 15 km Road Race Championships	Adelaide, Australia	9th	50:59
1988	Sapporo Half Marathon	Sapporo, Japan	2nd	73:57
1988	Gold Coast Half Marathon	Gold Coast, Australia	2nd	73:28
1988	Australian 15 km Road Race Championships	Canberra, Australia	2nd	51:49
1988	Chicago Marathon	Chicago, United States	4th	2:31:19
1989	World 15 km Road Race Championships	Rio de Janeiro, Brazil	24th	53:42
1990	Commonwealth Games Marathon	Auckland, New Zealand	2nd	2:33:15
1990	World 15 km Road Race Championships	Dublin, Ireland	18th	51:55
1992	London Marathon	London, United Kingdom	17th	2:40:39
1994	Nagoya International Women's Marathon	Nagoya, Japan	5th	2:34:29
1994	Commonwealth Games Marathon	Victoria, Canada	15th	3:06:27
1996	Sydney International Marathon	Sydney, Australia	4th	2:40:01
