= Guadaloupe Loma =

Mexican long-distance runner (born 1967)

Personal information
- Nationality: Mexican
- Born: 12 December 1967 (age 58)

Sport
- Sport: Long-distance running
- Event: Marathon

Guadaloupe Loma (born 12 December 1967) is a Mexican long-distance runner. She competed in the women's marathon at the 1996 Summer Olympics.
