= Jill Hunter =

English long-distance runner (born 1966)

Personal information
- Nationality: British (English)
- Born: 14 October 1966 (age 60) Hexham, Northumberland, England
- Height: 170 cm (5 ft 7 in)
- Weight: 51 kg (112 lb)
- Spouse: Daniel Boltz (present)
- Children: 3, including Poppy Boltz

Sport
- Sport: Athletics
- Event: middle/long distance
- Club: Blaydon Harriers AC; Valli Harriers
- Now coaching: Pace Project Running and Multisport
Medal record
athletics
Representing England
Commonwealth Games
Silver medal – second place	1990 Auckland	10,000m

Jill Boltz (née Hunter, born 14 October 1966) is an English former distance runner who represented Great Britain at the 1988 Seoul Olympics and the 1992 Barcelona Olympics. She won a silver medal in the 10,000 metres at the 1990 Commonwealth Games. In 1991, she broke the World Best for 10 miles, with 51:41 in New York City. She also twice won the AAA Championships 10,000 metres title (1989, 1995).

== Biography ==
Hunter was born in Hexham, Northumberland, England, and was a member of Blaydon Harriers Athletics Club and later Valli Harriers. She first came to prominence as a cross-country runner, finishing second to Angela Tooby at the 1988 UK world cross country trial, ahead of Zola Budd. At the 1988 World Cross Country Championships in Auckland she made the top ten, finishing ninth. In August, she finished second behind Yvonne Murray at the AAA Championships in the 3000 metres in 8:51.51, earning Olympic selection. Two weeks later, she ran her best ever 3000 metres at the Zurich Grand Prix, running 8:47.36. At the Seoul Olympics in September, she was eliminated in her heat, running 8:57.28

Hunter finished in the top ten at both the 1989 IAAF World Cross Country Championships in Stavanger and the 1989 World 15km Road Race Championships in Rio de Janeiro, placing seventh and sixth respectively. That year, she also won the AAAs National title at 10,000 metres, to earn Commonwealth selection for England.

At the 1990 Commonwealth Games in Auckland in January, she won the silver medal behind Scotland's Liz McColgan. Later that year, she finished eighth in the 10,000 metres final at the European Championships in Split.

Hunter had perhaps the best year of her career in 1991. In April, she broke Cathy O'Brien's 10 mile World Best on the roads, with 51:41 in New York City. In June, at the European Cup in Frankfurt, she ran her lifetime best 10,000 m with 31:07.88, to finish second behind Kathrin Ullrich who ran 31:03.62. This performance moved her to fifth on the world all-time list at the time. In July she ran 48:19 for 15 km on the roads, which at the time, ranked her sixth on the world all-time list. As the world's number three (after McColgan and Ullrich) she was a serious medal contender in the 10,000 metres at the World Championships in Tokyo, however she struggled in the humid conditions and finished ninth in the final in 32:24.55

In 1992, Hunter achieved her third top ten finish at the World Cross Country Championships, finishing eighth in Boston. In the summer, she ran her career best 5000 metres with 15:09.98 in Hechtel. Then in August, at the Barcelona Olympics, she finished 10th in the 10,000 metres final in 31:46.49. After struggling with injuries, Hunter returned to win her second AAAs 10,000 m title in 1995 and earn selection for the World Championships in Gothenburg, where she finished 15th in the 10,000 metres final.

As of 2022, Hunter ranks seventh on the UK all-time list for 10,000 m (31:07 in 1991), 11th on the 10 km road (31.42 in 1989) and eighth on the 15 km road (48:19 in 1991), while her 10-mile road best (51:41 in 1991) still ranks third on the UK all-time list, with Paula Radcliffe and Eilish McColgan being the only British women to have gone faster.

== Personal life ==
Hunter married Danny Boltz, a Swiss-born Australian distance runner, who represented Switzerland at the 1992 Barcelona Olympics in the Marathon.Their kids are Poppy Boltz, Ollie Boltz, Milo Boltz.

== National titles ==
- AAAs National 10,000 metres Champion (1989, 1995)

== International competitions ==
Year	Competition	Venue	Position	Event	Notes
Representing Great Britain / England
1988	World Cross Country Championships	Auckland, New Zealand	9th	6 km	19:46
1988	Olympic Games	Seoul, South Korea	20th (h)	3000 m	8:57.28
1989	World Cross Country Championships	Stavanger, Norway	7th	6 km	23:00
1989	World Road Race Championships	Rio de Janeiro, Brazil	6th	15 km	50:34
1990	Commonwealth Games	Auckland, New Zealand	2nd	10,000 m	32:33.21
1990	European Championships	Split, Yugoslavia	8th	10,000 m	32:10.15
1991	European Cup	Frankfurt, Germany	2nd	10,000 m	31:07.88
1991	World Championships	Tokyo, Japan	9th	10,000 m	32:24.55 (31:55.55)
1992	World Cross Country Championships	Boston, United States	8th	6.4 km	21:39
1992	Olympic Games	Barcelona, Spain	10th	10,000 m	31:46.49
1995	World Championships	Gothenburg, Sweden	15th	10,000 m	32:24.93 (32:22.93)

Notes:

- (h) Indicates overall position achieved in qualifying round.
- (#) indicates superior time achieved in qualifying round.
