= Zhong Huandi =

Chinese long-distance runner

Personal information
- Born: 28 June 1967 (age 59) Yunnan, China

Sport
- Sport: Track and field
Medal record
Representing China
World Championships
Silver medal – second place	1991 Tokyo	10,000m
Asian Games
Gold medal – first place	1990 Beijing	3000m
Gold medal – first place	1990 Beijing	10,000m
Gold medal – first place	1994 Hiroshima	Marathon
Asian Championships
Gold medal – first place	1989 New Delhi	3000 m
Gold medal – first place	1989 New Delhi	10,000 m
Gold medal – first place	1991 Kuala Lumpur	3000 m
Gold medal – first place	1991 Kuala Lumpur	10,000 m
Summer Universiade
Silver medal – second place	1987 Zagreb	10,000m

Zhong Huandi (Chinese: 钟焕娣; born 28 June 1967) is a retired Chinese long-distance runner who concentrated on the 3000 and 10,000 metres, and later the marathon. She became a four-time Asian champion and two-time World Championships silver medalist. On 8 September 1993, she became the second fastest 10,000 meter runner of all time, only surpassed by Wang Junxia, the winner of that same race by more than half a lap in what remained the world record until the 2016 Olympics. Both runners surpassed the standing world record by Ingrid Kristiansen.

== International competitions ==
Representing China
Year	Competition	Venue	Position	Event	Notes
1987	Universiade	Zagreb, Yugoslavia	2nd	10,000 m	
1988	World Road Race Championships	Adelaide, Australia	4th	15 km	50:29
1988	Olympic Games	Seoul, South Korea	30th	Marathon	2:36:02
1989	World Road Race Championships	Rio de Janeiro, Brazil	2nd	15 km	49:44
1990	Asian Games	Beijing, China	1st	3000 m	
1990	Asian Games	Beijing, China	1st	10,000 m	
1991	World Championships	Tokyo, Japan	2nd	10,000 m	31:35.08
1991	World Road Race Championships	Dublin, Ireland	3rd	15 km	50:19
1992	Olympic Games	Barcelona, Spain	4th	10,000 m	31:21.08
1992	World Cup	Habana, Cuba	3rd	10,000 m	
1993	World Championships	Stuttgart, Germany	2nd	10,000 m	31:12.55
1993	East Asian Games	Shanghai, China	1st	10,000 m	
1994	Asian Games	Hiroshima, Japan	1st	Marathon	2:29:32

== See also ==
- China at the World Championships in Athletics
