= Willie Mtolo =

South African long-distance runner

William Bhekizizwe Mtolo (born May 5, 1964) is a South African former long-distance runner who mainly competed in marathons. He is a former New York Marathon winner and two-time runner-up of the Comrades Marathon. He represented his country at the 1993 World Championships in Athletics, but failed to finish in the marathon.

For the bulk of his early career, Mtolo was banned from competing internationally until 1992, due to the South Africa sports boycott associated with apartheid. He began to have success at national level in his early twenties. He won the Johannesburg-Pretoria 50K and the Durban Athletic Club Marathon in 1984 and won the latter title again four years later. He also demonstrated his abilities over the half marathon with wins at the Dick King Half Marathon in 1985 and 1990.

A personal best in the marathon of 2:08:15 hours came in 1986 in Port Elizabeth, but this was done on a course not suitable for record purposes. He won the national marathon championship in Cape Town in 1988 and his time of 2:10:18 hours was ratified as the South African record for the distance. He defended his national title the following year. His record stood for less than two years, being broken by David Tsebe.

Mtolo participated in several marathons in South Africa and won five of them during his career, including the J.S.E. Marathon (1985), S.A. Marathon (1988), Ford Marathon (1988), Two Oceans Marathon (1990), and Peninsula Marathon (1990).

Once Apartheid was ended, the South African sports boycott ceased and Mtolo was able to compete internationally. In his first year of competition abroad, he won both the New York City Marathon and the Enschede Marathon. Towards the end of his career, he won the Macau Marathon in 2000.

Mtolo currently organizes charity runs for peace in South African townships, and has opened his own athletic academy called the Willie Athletic Club.
