= Marta Jimenez =

Spanish philosopher (born 1974)

Marta Jiménez
- Born: 1974 (age 51–52)

Education
- Education: University of Toronto (PhD), Complutense University of Madrid (BA)

Philosophical work
- Era: 21st-century philosophy
- Region: Western philosophy
- Institutions: Emory University
- Main interests: ancient Greek philosophy, moral psychology
- Website: https://www.martajimenez.me/

Marta Jiménez (born 1974) is a Spanish philosopher and associate professor of philosophy at Emory University. She is known for her works on Aristotle. She is not to be confused with the Spanish historian and other persons of the same name.

== Books ==
- Aristotle on Shame and Learning to Be Good, Oxford University Press, 2020, ISBN 9780198829683
- Aristotle on Justice as a Personal Virtue: Self-Love, Friendship and Equality (forthcoming)
