= Albertina Dias =

Portuguese long-distance runner (born 1965)

Medal record

Women's athletics

Representing Portugal

World Cross Country Championships
Silver medal – second place	1990 Aix-les-Bains	Long race
Bronze medal – third place	1990 Aix-les-Bains	Team long race
Bronze medal – third place	1992 Boston	Long race
Gold medal – first place	1993 Amorebieta	Long race
Gold medal – first place	1994 Budapest	Team long race

Maria Albertina da Costa Dias Pereira (born 26 April 1965 in Miragaia) is a former Portuguese long-distance runner. She competed in three consecutive Summer Olympics for her native country, starting in 1988. She was the first female Portuguese world champion in cross country running, having won the long race at the 1993 IAAF World Cross Country Championships.

== Career ==
She finished tenth in the 10,000 metres at the 1988 Summer Olympics. Her first real successes came in cross country running: she won the long race individual silver and the team bronze at the 1990 IAAF World Cross Country Championships. Dias won the Eurocross meeting in 1991 and went on to take sixth place at the 1991 Cross Country Championships. Competing at the world indoors for the first time, she finished in fourth place in the 3000 metres at the IAAF World Indoor Championships. At her first outdoor World Championships in Athletics in 1991, she failed to finish in the 10,000 metres final. Her second world medal, a bronze, came at the 1992 IAAF World Cross Country Championships long race.

Dias attended her second Olympics, the 1992 Barcelona Games and finished in 13th at the 10,000 metres final. She won the 1993 IAAF World Cross Country Championships long race the following year, becoming the first Portuguese woman to ever complete the feat. She won the Olympic Medal Nobre Guedes as a result. She failed to match this feat at the 1993 World Championships in Athletics as she finished seventh in the 10,000 m. A fifth-place finish at the 1994 IAAF World Cross Country Championships was enough for a team gold with Portugal, led by Conceição Ferreira. She began competing in the half marathon and took fourth place at the 1994 IAAF World Half Marathon Championships.

She took part in her third World Athletics Championships but again failed to finish the 10,000 metres final at the 1995 Championships. After a fifth-place finish at the 1996 European Cross Country Championships, she ran in her third Olympics for Portugal – this time in the Olympic marathon race. She finished in 27th place, out-performed by compatriot Manuela Machado, who took 7th.

An eleventh place at the 1998 IAAF World Half Marathon Championships and seventh place with a team gold at the 1998 European Cross Country Championships brought a close to her career.

== International competitions ==
Year	Competition	Venue	Position	Event	Notes
Representing Portugal
1988	World Cross Country Championships	Auckland, New Zealand	—		DNF
1988	Olympic Games	Seoul, South Korea	10th	10,000m	32:07.13
1989	World Cross Country Championships	Stavanger, Norway	18th		
1990	World Cross Country Championships	Aix-les-Bains, France	2nd		
1991	World Indoor Championships	Seville, Spain	4th	3000 m	8:55.45
1991	World Cross Country Championships	Antwerp, Belgium	6th		
1991	World Championships	Tokyo, Japan	—	10,000m	DNF
1992	World Cross Country Championships	Boston, United States	3rd		
1992	Olympic Games	Barcelona, Spain	13th	10,000m	32.03.93
1993	World Cross Country Championships	Amorebieta, Spain	1st		
1993	World Championships	Stuttgart, Germany	7th	10,000m	31:33.03
1994	World Cross Country Championships	Budapest, Hungary	5th		
1994	World Half Marathon Championships	Oslo, Norway	4th		1:09:57
1995	World Cross Country Championships	Durham, United Kingdom	9th		
1995	World Championships	Gothenburg, Sweden	—	10,000m	DNF
1996	World Cross Country Championships	Cape Town, South Africa	31st		
1996	Olympic Games	Atlanta, United States	27th	Marathon	2:36:39
1998	World Half Marathon Championships	Uster, Switzerland	11th		1:11:08

Awards
Preceded by Jorge Pereira	Olympic Medal Nobre Guedes; 1993	Succeeded by Fernanda Ribeiro
