= Elana Meyer =

South African long-distance runner

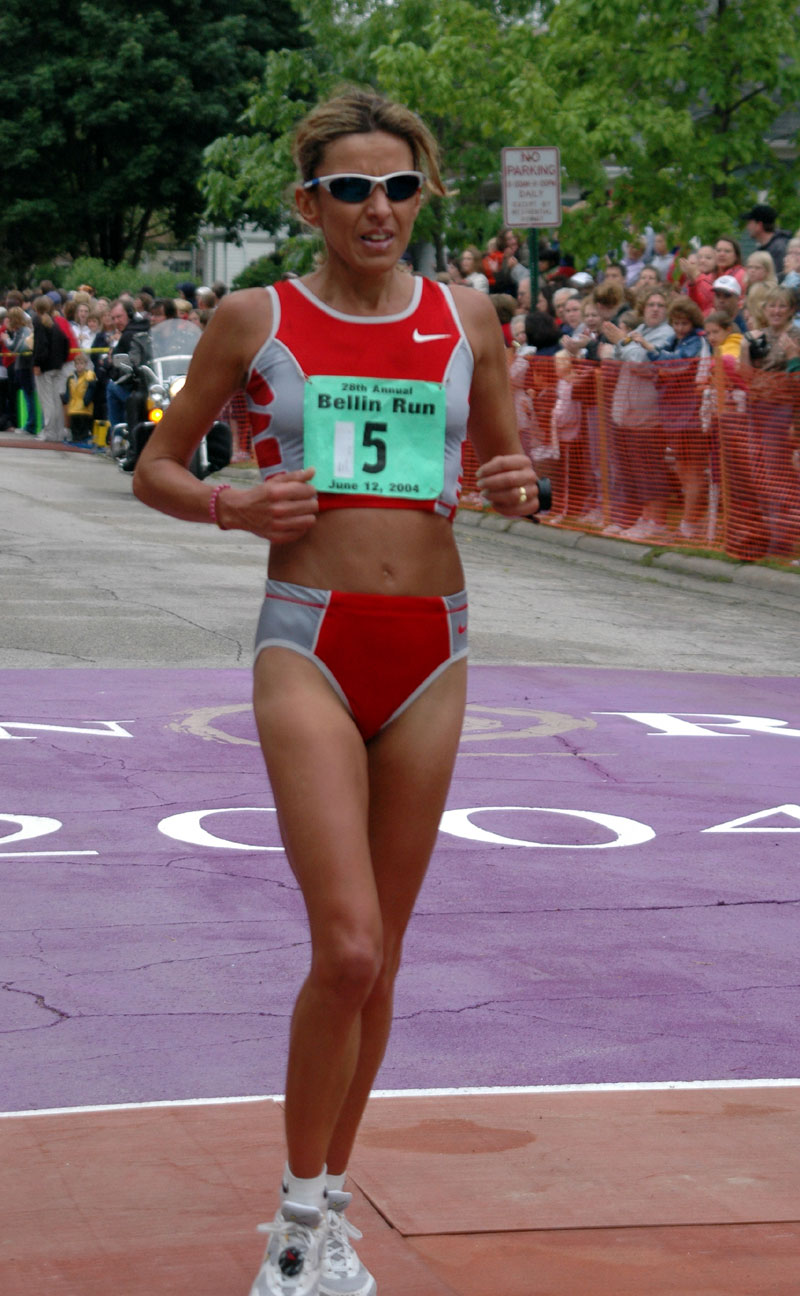

Medal record

Women's athletics

Representing South Africa

Olympic Games
Silver medal – second place	1992 Barcelona	10,000 m

Commonwealth Games
Silver medal – second place	1994 Victoria	10,000 m

All-Africa Games
Silver medal – second place	1999 Johannesburg	5,000 m

African Championships
Gold medal – first place	1992 Belle-Vue	1,500 m
Gold medal – first place	1993 Durban	1,500 m

World Half Marathon Championships
Gold medal – first place	1994 Oslo	Half Marathon
Silver medal – second place	1998 Uster	Half Marathon

Elana Meyer, OIS, (born 10 October 1966) is a South African long-distance runner who won the silver medal at the 1992 Summer Olympics in the 10,000 metres event.

Meyer set the 15 kilometres road running African record of 46:57 minutes in November 1991 in Cape Town. The record was equalled by Ethiopia's Mestawet Tufa in 2008. The record was beaten in 2009 by Tirunesh Dibaba, also from Ethiopia, who posted a new world record of 46:28 minutes.

Meyer also held the half marathon African record (1:06:44 hours), set in January 1999 in Tokyo. The record was broken by Mary Keitany of Kenya at the 2009 IAAF World Half Marathon Championships by running the distance in 1:06:36 hours.

She was the gold medallist at the 1994 IAAF World Half Marathon Championships and set world records in that event in 1991, 1997, 1998, and 1999. She also had several good placings in top level marathon races.

Records
Preceded by (Norway) Ingrid Kristiansen (Germany) Uta Pippig	Women's Half marathon World record holder 18 May 1991 – 19 March 1995; 9 March 1997 – 14 October 2007	Succeeded by (Germany) Uta Pippig (Netherlands) Lornah Kiplagat
Sporting positions
Preceded by Angela Chalmers	Women's 3,000 m Best Year Performance; 1991	Succeeded by Yelena Romanova
Preceded by Yelena Romanova	Women's 5,000 m Best Year Performance; 1991–1992	Succeeded by Sonia O'Sullivan
