= Blanca Jaime =

Mexican long-distance runner

Blanca Jaime (born November 3, 1965) is a retired female long-distance runner from Mexico. She represented her native country at the 1988 Summer Olympics in Seoul, South Korea, where she finished in 43rd place in the women's marathon, clocking a total time of 2:43:00.

== Achievements ==
Year	Competition	Venue	Position	Event	Notes
Representing Mexico
1988	Los Angeles Marathon	Los Angeles, United States	1st	Marathon	2:36:11
1988	Olympic Games	Seoul, South Korea	43rd	Marathon	2:43:00
