= Nelly Glauser =

Swiss long-distance runner

Personal information
- Nationality: Swiss
- Born: 27 January 1966 (age 60) Boncourt, Bern, Switzerland

Sport
- Sport: Long-distance running
- Event: Marathon

Nelly Glauser (born 27 January 1966) is a Swiss long-distance runner. She competed in the women's marathon at the 1996 Summer Olympics.
