= Izumi Maki (athlete) =

Japanese long-distance runner (1968–2018)

Personal information
- Native name: 真木 和
- Nationality: Japanese
- Born: Yamaoka; December 10, 1968 Imabari, Ehime
- Died: October 18, 2018 (aged 49) Namikata, Ehime

Sport
- Country: Japan
- Sport: Athletics
- Events: Marathon, 10,000m
- Team: Wacoal

Achievements and titles
- Olympic finals: 12th (1992, 1996)
- World finals: 22nd (1991 IAAF World Cross Country Championships); 17th (10,000m 1993 World Championships in Athletics
- National finals: 1st (10,000m 1992)
- Personal bests: 31:40.38 (10,000m), 2:27:32 hrs (marathon)

Izumi Maki (真木 和, Maki Izumi; née Yamaoka (山岡); December 10, 1968 – October 18, 2018 in Namikata, Ehime) was a Japanese long-distance runner who competed in the marathon. She represented her native country twice at the Summer Olympics: in 1992 (12th place in the 10,000 metres) and 1996 (12th place in the women's marathon). She competed for the Wacoal corporate team during her career.

In addition to her Olympic appearances, Maki competed three times at the IAAF World Cross Country Championships (1991 to 1993) with her best performance being 22nd in the 1991 women's race. She was also a two-time participant at the World Championships in Athletics in the 10,000 m, coming 20th in 1991 and 17th in 1993. She won the Japanese Championship in the 10,000 m once in her career, in 1992.

Maki had back-to-back wins at the Shibetsu Half Marathon in 1993 and 1994, and also won the Gold Coast Half Marathon in the latter year. She was the initial winner of the 1995 Sapporo Half Marathon in a time of 70:10 minutes but was disqualified for a doping violation and banned for three months.

Later in her career she focused on marathon running. She won the 1996 Nagoya International Women's Marathon and the Pilot Marathon in 1998. She retired from the sport in the late 1990s. She is now a training advisor to the Fujita Running Academy.

Maki holds the Asian record for the infrequently contested 20,000 m track race, a mark which was formerly the world record for the event.

She died of breast cancer on October 18, 2018. She was 49.

== Personal bests ==
- 5000 metres – 15:27.12 min (19910
- 10,000 metres – 31:40.38 min (1992 – former Japanese record)
- One hour run – 17.693 m (1994)
- 20,000 metres – 66:48 min (1993)
- Half marathon – 68:18 min (1996)
- Marathon – 2:27:32 hrs (1996)

== International competitions ==
Representing Japan
| Year | Competition | Venue | Position | Event | Notes |
|---|---|---|---|---|---|
| 1991 | World Championships | Tokyo, Japan | 20th | 10,000 m | 33:27.84 |
| 1992 | Olympic Games | Barcelona, Spain | 12th | 10,000m | 31:55.06 |
| 1996 | Nagoya Marathon | Nagoya, Japan | 1st | Marathon | 2:27:32 |
| 1996 | Olympic Games | Atlanta, United States | 12th | Marathon | 2:32:35 |
