= Fernanda Marques =

Portuguese long-distance runner

Personal information
- Full name: Deolinda Fernanda da Silva Marques
- Nationality: Portuguese
- Born: 15 April 1966 (age 60)

Sport
- Sport: Long-distance running
- Event: 10,000 metres

Deolinda Fernanda da Silva Marques (born 15 April 1966) is a Portuguese long-distance runner. She competed in the women's 10,000 metres at the 1992 Summer Olympics.
