= Anuța Cătună =

Romanian long-distance runner

Anuța Cătună (born 1 October 1968 in Lunca Ilvei, Bistrița-Năsăud) is a former female long-distance runner from Romania, who represented her native country at two consecutive Summer Olympics, starting in 1996. She won the 1996 edition of the New York City Marathon. Her personal best time over the distance was 2:26:25 at the World Championships in 1995.

== Achievements ==
Year	Competition	Venue	Position	Event	Notes
Representing Romania
1991	Leipzig Marathon	Leipzig, Germany	1st	Marathon	2:45:01
1992	World Half Marathon Championships	Newcastle, United Kingdom	4th	Half marathon	1:10:25
1994	European Championships	Helsinki, Finland	5th	Marathon	2:32:51
1994	World Half Marathon Championships	Oslo, Norway	2nd	Half marathon	1:09:35
1995	World Half Marathon Championships	Montbéliard–Belfort, France	2nd	Half marathon	1:10:28
1995	World Championships	Gothenburg, Sweden	2nd	Marathon	2:26:25
1996	Olympic Games	Atlanta, United States	44th	Marathon	2:42:01
1996	New York City Marathon	New York City, United States	1st	Marathon	2:28:18
1997	World Championships	Athens, Greece	11th	Marathon	2:38:38
2000	Olympic Games	Sydney, Australia	—	Marathon	DNF
