= Susan Hobson =

Australian long-distance runner

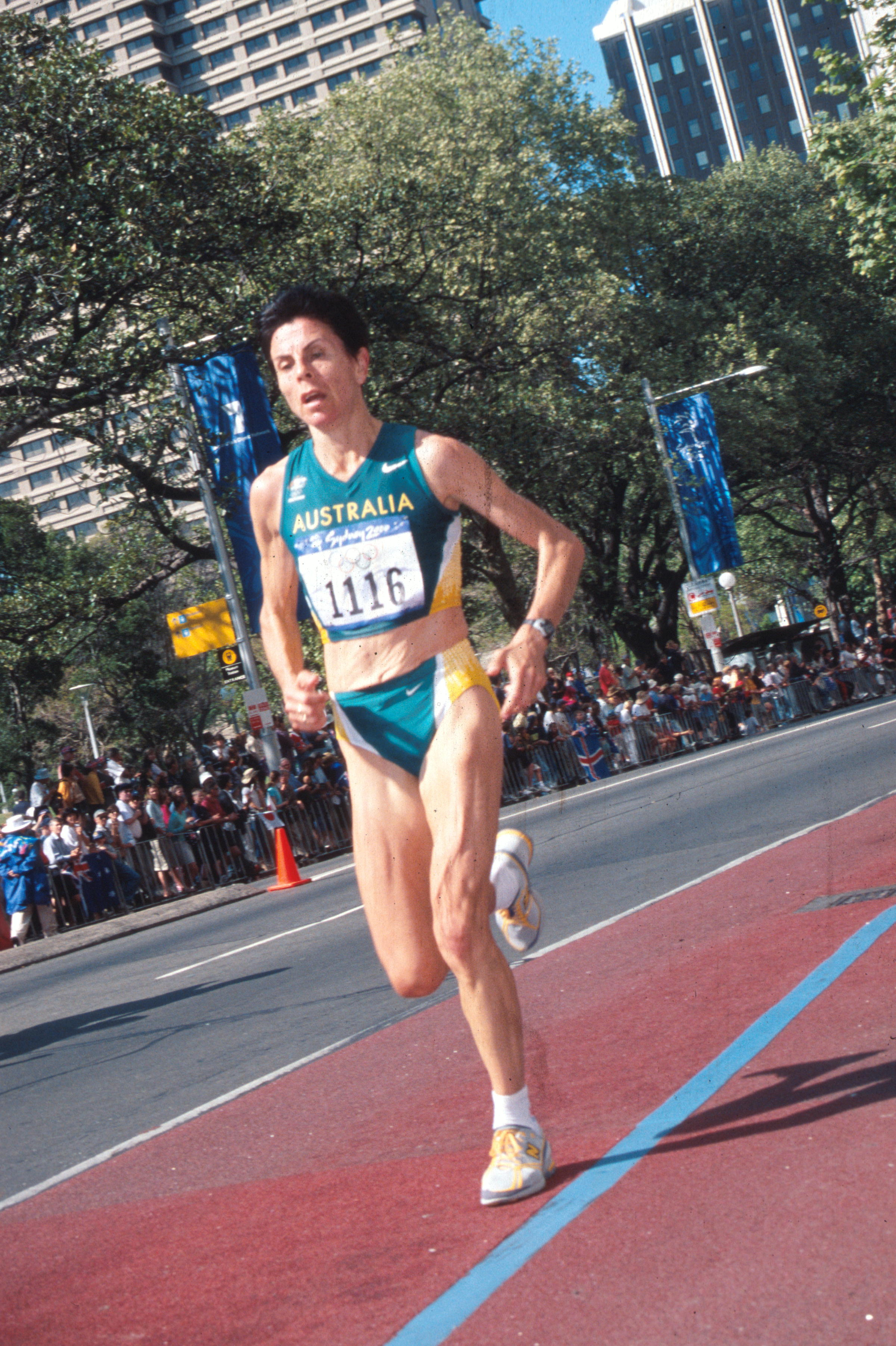
- Hobson in the Women's Marathon at Sydney Olympics 2000

Personal information
- Nationality: Australian
- Born: 13 March 1958 (age 68) Queanbeyan, New South Wales

Sport
- Sport: Long-distance running

Susan Elizabeth Hobson (born 13 March 1958) is an Australian former athlete. She competed at three successive Olympic Games and two Commonwealth Games. She started her competitive athletics career at the age of 27.

She competed in the 10,000 metres at the 1992 and 1996 Olympics and in the marathon at the 2000 Sydney Games. She also represented her country at the 1991 World Athletics Championships in 10,000 metres. She competed at two Commonwealth Games – 3000 and 10,000m at the Auckland games in 1990 and marathon at the 1994 games in Victoria, British Columbia.

Hobson also competed at the World Cross Country Championships in 1989, 1990, 1991, 1992 and 1993 as well as the 1993 IAAF World Half Marathon Championships. Her best placement was 16th from 1992.

Hobson was Australian champion thrice in the 10,000m (1991–92, 1992–93, 1993–1994), twice in the marathon (1997 and 2000), and once in the cross country (1996).

During her athletics career, she was a scholarship holder with the Australian Institute of Sport, ACT Academy of Sport and West Australian Institute of Sport. Hobson was coached by Pat Clohessy (1988–2000) and Dick Telford (1996–97).

After her athletics career, Hobson was a board member of ACT Athletics and the Athletics Australia Distance Running Commission. She managed the Australian Athletics Teams at the 2009 and 2011 World Championships in Athletics and the 2010 Commonwealth Games. Hobson was section manager of the Australian Athletics Team at the 2012 London Olympics.

== Recognition ==
- 1993 – Athletics Australia Edwin Flack Award
- 2007 – Inducted into ACT Sport Hall of Fame
- 2013 – Life member of Athletics Australia
