= Uta Pippig =

German long-distance runner

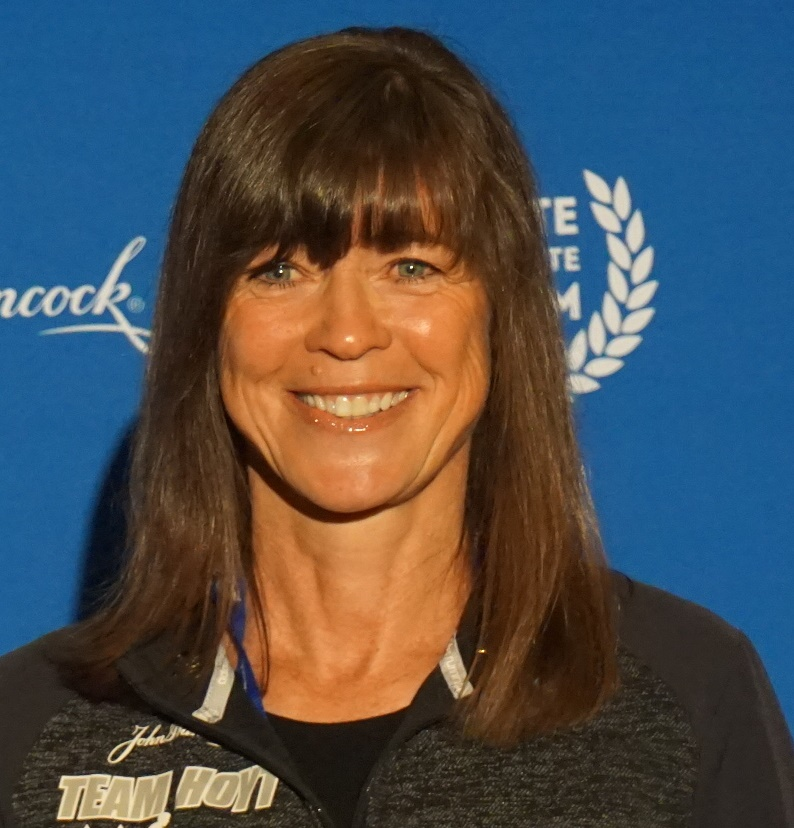
Uta Pippig in 2019

Uta Pippig (German pronunciation: [ˈuːta ˈpɪpɪx], born 7 September 1965) is a retired German long-distance runner, and the first woman to officially win the Boston Marathon three consecutive times (1994–1996). She also won the Berlin Marathon three times (1990, 1992 and 1995); the 1993 New York City Marathon; represented Germany at the Olympic Games in 1992 and 1996, and won a bronze medal at the 1991 World 15km Road Race Championship. Her marathon best of 2:21:45 set in Boston in 1994, made her the third-fastest female marathon runner in history at that time.

== Career ==
The daughter of two physicians, Pippig was born in Leipzig and began running at the age of 13 while a citizen of the former East Germany. She finished 14th in the marathon at the 1987 World Championships in Rome. In university, she was a medical student at the Humboldt University Berlin and when the Berlin Wall came down in November 1989, she continued her studies at the Freie University of Berlin. After passing her final exams, she chose to re-focus her attention exclusively on running professionally. She left East Germany in 1990 before the German reunification. She won the Eurocross meeting in Luxembourg that year.

Pippig's results on the track at 10,000 meters, include finishing sixth at the 1991 World Championships, seventh at the 1992 Olympic Games, and ninth at the 1993 World Championships. She also won a bronze medal at the 1991 World 15 km Road Race Championship. She held the half marathon world record for close to two years with a time of 67:58 she ran in Kyoto 1994.

Pippig won the 1994 Boston Marathon in a lifetime best of 2:21:45, which at the time put her third on the world all-time list behind Ingrid Kristiansen and Joan Benoit. As of 2016, the time still ranks her second on the German all-time list behind Irina Mikitenko. Pippig won the 1996 Boston Marathon in the midst of ischemic colitis. This was incorrectly attributed to menstruation.. Eileen McNamara's. At the 1996 Olympic Games, she dropped out of the marathon after 22 miles, having led earlier in the race.

In 2006, Pippig founded Take The Magic Step to provide health information and charitable support to individuals and to organizations that promote wellness and education. In 2005, she was named to the board of advisors of the MIT Agelab in Massachusetts. In 2008, Pippig and her Take The Magic Step business consultant Michael Reger created the Take The Magic Step Foundation to provide financial and logistical support to organizations that promote education, fitness, and health. The foundation's mission is to improve the lives of underprivileged children through organizations already established to help others. The foundation supports organizations such as SOS Outreach in Colorado, the Louisa May Alcott Orchard House in Massachusetts, and the Kinderhilfe e.V. charity in Pippig's hometown of Petershagen, Germany. Since 2020 Pippig is part of the curatorium of Children for a better World e.V. Her recent program Run for Children brought the Berlin Marathon and Children for a better World together to help children in Berlin.

In 2012 Pippig began her international speaking series, Running To Freedom. The series explores the value of freedom to individuals and society, and includes Pippig's own history of her journey to freedom. In 2016 Pippig began writing columns for the German newspaper Die Welt, and then for the German running magazine Laufzeit & Condition. In 2017, Pippig became the running expert and spokesperson for the Berlin Marathon.

In 2022 Pippig became a Kripalu yoga teacher studying with the Kripalu Center for Yoga and Health in Massachusetts. She added an Āyurveda yoga (2025) and meditation teacher (2023) certifications with the same institute. Pippig is working as a public speaker and yoga and meditation teacher sharing her mental approach which has evolved since she started as a young athlete. Her seminars and sessions include Mindful Walking, Yoga and Running, and Loving/Kindness Meditation added to her overall teachings of longevity, fitness, and health.

== The Dismissed Case With the DLV ==
In 1998, an out-of-competition drug test found Pippig had an elevated ratio of testosterone to epitestosterone, and the German Athletics Federation attempted to ban her for two years. Pippig contested the finding on the grounds that her testosterone levels were normal, and that the elevated ratio was due to a low level of epitestosterone from a long battle with chronic bowel disease and other factors. This claim was supported by a variety of independent medical experts, (Note: In analyses, it was determined by independent specialists Dr. Robert Barbieri, the Chief of Obstetrics and Gynecology at the Brigham and Women's Hospital in Boston, who is also an expert in hormones and the use of steroids, and Dr. Horst Lüppert, the Head of Obstetrics and Gynecology at The Free University in Berlin, that Uta Pippig's ratio imbalance was not due to high levels of testosterone, but rather low levels of epitestosterone. Separate expert opinions from both Dr. Barbieri and Dr. Lübbert, independently concluded that the use of oral contraceptives and active bowel disease both raise the T:E ratio. According to Dr. Barbieri, "The T:E ratio is not valid for women on oral contraceptives with active bowel disease." According to Dr. Barbieri, "In April 1998, at or around the time that a urine specimen was taken for androgen matabolite analysis, Ms. Pippig was on oral contraceptive pills and had active bowel disease.") and a German arbitration court dismissed the case.

== Achievements ==
Year	Competition	Venue	Position	Event	Notes
Representing East Germany
1986	Leipzig Marathon	Leipzig, East Germany	1st	Marathon	2:37:56
1987	World Championships	Rome, Italy	14th	Marathon	2.39.30
1987	Leipzig Marathon	Leipzig, East Germany	1st	Marathon	2:30:50
1990	Berlin Marathon	Berlin, West Germany	1st	Marathon	2:28:37
Representing Germany
1991	World Championships	Tokyo, Japan	6th	10,000 m	31:55.68
1991	IAAF World Women's Road Race Championships	Nieuwegein, Netherlands	3rd	15 km	48.44
1992	Olympic Games	Barcelona, Spain	7th	10,000 m	31.36.45
1992	Berlin Marathon	Berlin, Germany	1st	Marathon	2:30:22
1993	World Championships	Stuttgart, Germany	9th	10,000 m	31.39.97
1993	New York City Marathon	New York, United States	1st	Marathon	2:26:24
1994	Boston Marathon	Boston, United States	1st	Marathon	2:21:45
1995	Boston Marathon	Boston, United States	1st	Marathon	2:25:11
1995	Berlin Marathon	Berlin, Germany	1st	Marathon	2:25:37
1996	Boston Marathon	Boston, United States	1st	Marathon	2:27:12
1996	Olympic Games	Atlanta, United States	—	Marathon	DNF

=== Personal bests ===
- 5000 metres - 15:04.87 (1991)
- 10,000 metres - 31:21.36 (1992)
- Half-marathon - 67:58 (1995)
- Marathon - 2:21:45 (1994)

== Notes ==
Records
Preceded by (South Africa) Elana Meyer	Women's Half marathon World record holder 19 March 1995 – 9 March 1997	Succeeded by (South Africa) Elana Meyer
Sporting positions
Preceded by Birgit Weinhold	Women's Leipzig Marathon winner 1986–1987	Succeeded by Beate Kauke
