= Olga Markova (runner) =

Russian long-distance runner

Olga Markova (Russian: Ольга Маркова; born August 6, 1968) is a retired long-distance runner from Russia, who set the world's best year performance in 1992 and a new national record, when she won the Boston Marathon, clocking 2:23:43. In 1993, she defended her victory in Boston in 2:25:27. She did not make the Olympic team after finishing in fourth at the 1991 USSR Championships behind, among others, Madina Biktagirova, who tested positive for norephedrine at the 1992 Summer Olympics, earning the distinction of being the first Olympic marathoner to ever be disqualified for failing a drug test. The first Soviet-born athlete to win Boston, Olga Markova is the only Russian or Soviet athlete to defend a Boston marathon victory, and along with Irina Mikitenko (in 2009-09), the only Soviet-born athlete to defend a title of any of the current World Marathon Majors.

Currently, Markova resides in Gainesville, Florida.

== Marathons ==
Year	Competition	Venue	Position	Event	Notes
Representing Russia
1990	Hamburg Marathon	Hamburg, Germany	3rd	Marathon	2:38:00
1990	Marine Corps Marathon	Washington, D.C.	1st	Marathon	2:37:00
1991	Los Angeles Marathon	Los Angeles, United States	4th	Marathon	2:33:27
1991	New York City Marathon	New York City, United States	2nd	Marathon	2:28:27
1991	USSR Championships	Bila Tserkva, Ukraine	4th	Marathon	2:34:07
1992	Boston Marathon	Boston, United States	1st	Marathon	2:23:43
1993	Boston Marathon	Boston, United States	1st	Marathon	2:25:27
1994	Osaka Women's Marathon	Osaka, Japan	10th	Marathon	2:32:22
