= 1988 World Junior Championships in Athletics – Women's 10,000 metres =

The women's 10,000 metres event at the 1988 World Junior Championships in Athletics was held in Sudbury, Ontario, Canada, at Laurentian University Stadium on 29 July.

== Medalists ==
Gold	Jane Ngotho; Kenya
Silver	Olga Nazarkina; Soviet Union
Bronze	Mónica Gama; Portugal

== Results ==
=== Final ===
29 July

Rank	Name	Nationality	Time	Notes
1st place, gold medalist(s)	Jane Ngotho	Kenya	33:49.45	
2nd place, silver medalist(s)	Olga Nazarkina	Soviet Union	33:50.03	
3rd place, bronze medalist(s)	Mónica Gama	Portugal	34:16.13	
4	María del Carmen Díaz	Mexico	34:23.38	
5	Sonia Barry	New Zealand	34:44.92	
6	Birgit Jerschabek	East Germany	34:46.77	
7	Nives Curti	Italy	35:10.75	
8	Amy Wendy	United States	35:20.20	
9	Carole Trepanier	Canada	35:38.09	
10	Sandra Ruales	Ecuador	35:44.30	
11	Solange de Souza	Brazil	36:25.20	
12	Cindy Davis	United States	36:27.97	
13	Ikuko Takahashi	Japan	37:04.95	
14	Suzana Ćirić	Yugoslavia	37:09.98	
15	Lucia Marcon	Italy	37:25.71	
16	Lisa Harvey	Canada	37:51.95	
17	Annet Bezemer	Netherlands	38:11.36	
18	Yolanda Budich	Australia	38:43.33	
19	Kirsi Valasti	Finland	39:07.30	
	Larisa Alekseyeva	Soviet Union	DNF	
	Anke Schäning	East Germany	DNF	
	Karin Broberg	New Zealand	DNF	
	Valerie Chauvel	France	DNF	
	Ana Oliveira	Portugal	DNF	
	Aisling Ryan	Ireland	DNF	

== Participation ==
According to an unofficial count, 25 athletes from 18 countries participated in the event.

- Australia (1)
- Brazil (1)
- Canada (2)
- East Germany (2)
- Ecuador (1)
- Finland (1)
- France (1)
- Ireland (1)
- Italy (2)
- Japan (1)
- Kenya (1)
- Mexico (1)
- Netherlands (1)
- New Zealand (2)
- Portugal (2)
- Soviet Union (2)
- United States (2)
- Yugoslavia (1)
