= 10-mile run =

Distance running event

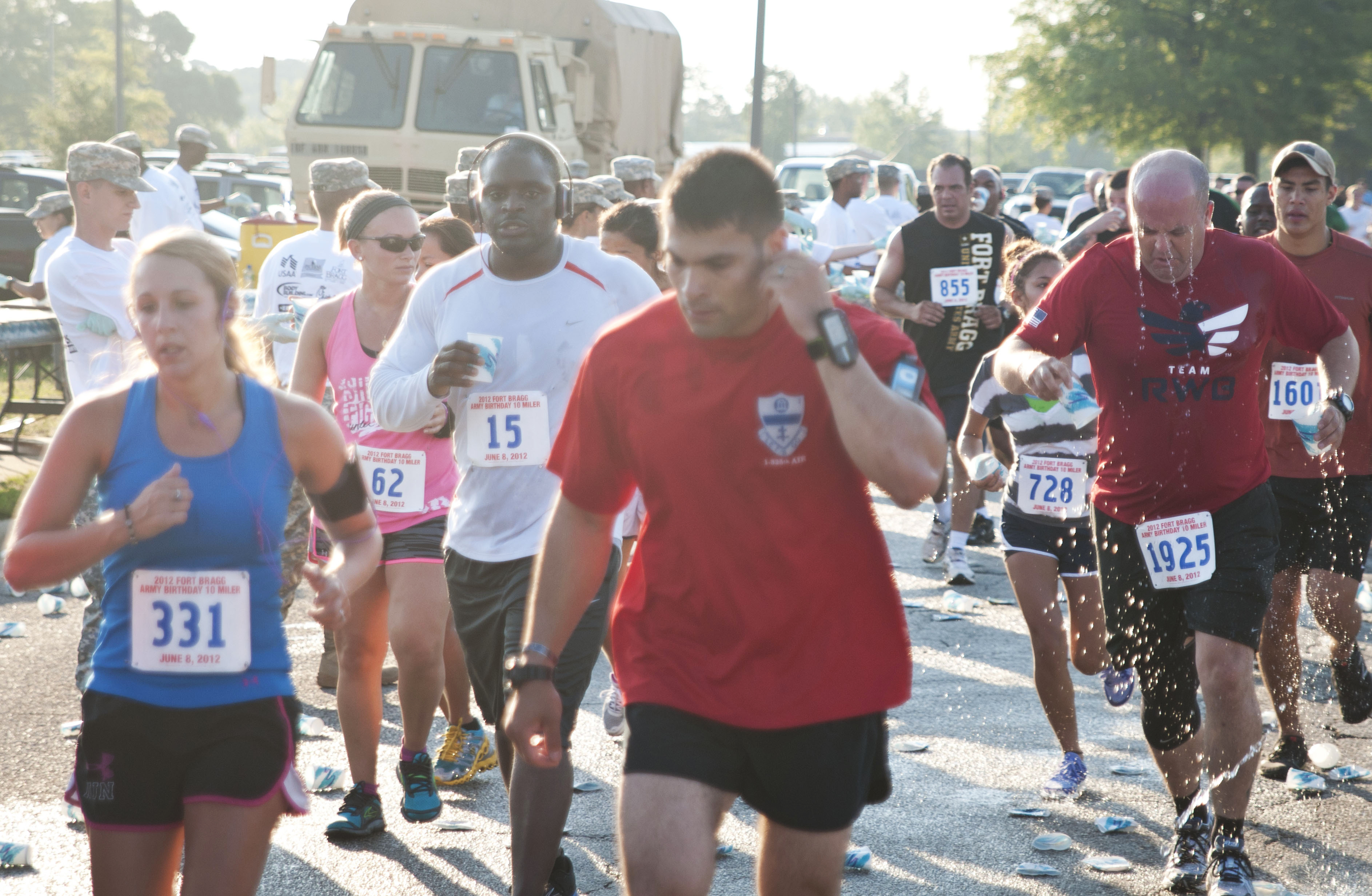
Runners taking part in the 2012 Army Ten-Miler

The 10-mile run is a long-distance running event over a distance of ten miles (16 kilometres). It can be held on a road course or on a running track. Also referred to as a 10-miler or 10 miles run, it is a relatively common distance in countries that use the mile as a unit of measure. Ten miles is roughly an intermediate distance between the 10K run and the half marathon (21.1 km). The level of endurance required to run the distance means it attracts more seasoned runners than shorter events and usually requires a period of preparation for first-time attempts.

On the track, a noted professional athlete named Reed is believed to have run 10 miles in under an hour at the Artillery Ground, London, in 1774. The event was included in the AAA Championships from 1880 to 1972, but it has never formed part of major championships. The IAAF, now called World Athletics, ratified records for the event from 1921 to 1975 when all records at imperial distances other than the one mile run were discontinued.

As a road race, the distance most frequently occurs in non-international, low-level races. Races that attract international-standard athletes are mostly based in the United States, United Kingdom and the Low Countries. Among the longest running 10-mile competitions are the Ten Mile Road Race in Thunder Bay, first held 1910, and the Harold Webster Memorial 10 mile, first held in 1920, both held in Ontario, Canada. The Association of Road Racing Statisticians (ARRS) records world records for the distance, with the approved times for men and women being Haile Gebrselassie's time of 44:23.0 minutes, set on 4 September 2005 at the Tilburg Ten Miles, and Teyba Erkesso's 51:43.4, set on 1 April 2007 at the Cherry Blossom Ten Mile Run. The ARRS only recognises performances at the given distance, rather than intermediate times. Several women have run the 10 miles in faster times, including Taylor Roe (49:53), or as part of a half marathon, including Mary Keitany (50:05) and Ruth Chepng'etich in the marathon (49:49).

== All-time top 25 ==
- + = en route to longer performance

=== Men ===
- Correct as of May 2026.

Rank	Time	Athlete	Nation	Date	Race	Place	Ref.
1	44:04	Benard Koech	Kenya	4 December 2022	Kosa 10-Miler	Kōsa	
2	44:24 (Note: The Association of Road Racing Statisticians regard Gebrselassie's time to be 44:23 based on initially reported stopped times of 44:22.8, 44:23.0 and 44:23.1. The race organisers do not confirm these times and officially regard the time to be 44:24)	Haile Gebrselassie	Ethiopia	4 September 2005	Tilburg Ten Miles	Tilburg	
3	44:27 a	Leonard Komon	Kenya	18 September 2011	Dam tot Damloop	Amsterdam-Zaandam	
4	44:45 a	Paul Koech	Kenya	1997	Dam tot Damloop	Amsterdam-Zaandam	
5	44:51	Martin Mathathi	Kenya	12 December 2004	Kosa 10-Miler	Kōsa	
5	44:51 a	Muktar Edris	Ethiopia	22 September 2024	Dam tot Damloop	Amsterdam-Zaandam	
7	44:57	Geoffrey Kamworor	Kenya	11 May 2019		Bern	
8	44:57.65+	Sabastian Sawe	Kenya	2 September 2022	Memorial Van Damme	Brussels	
9	45:03	Rodgers Kwemoi	Kenya	3 September 2017		Tilburg	
10	45:06	Evans Chebet	Kenya	3 September 2017		Tilburg	
11	45:08	Charles Kamathi	Kenya	22 September 2002	Dam tot Damloop	Amsterdam-Zaandam	
12	45:08.33	Joshua Izewski	United States	3 May 2026	Independence Blue Cross Broad Street Run	Philadelphia	
13	45:10	Samuel Wanjiru	Kenya	11 December 2005	Kosa 10-Miler	Kōsa	
14	45:10.65+	Kibiwott Kandie	Kenya	2 September 2022	Memorial Van Damme	Brussels	
15	45:12	Bernard Kiprop Koech	Kenya	7 September 2014		Tilburg	
16	45:13	Ian Stewart	Great Britain	8 May 1977		Stoke	
16	45:13	Conner Mantz	United States	6 October 2024	The Medtronic TC 10 Mile	Minneapolis-Saint Paul	
18	45:14	Charles Hicks	Great Britain	6 April 2025	Cherry Blossom Ten Mile Run	Washington	
19	45:15	Gideon Ngatunyi	Kenya	7 December 2008	Kosa 10-Miler	Kōsa	
19	45:15	Allan Kiprono	Kenya	1 April 2012	Cherry Blossom Ten Mile Run	Washington	
19	45:15	Alex Maier	United States	6 April 2025	Cherry Blossom Ten Mile Run	Washington	
19	45:15 a	Joshua Cheptegei	Uganda	23 September 2018	Dam tot Damloop	Amsterdam–Zaandam	
23	45:16	Simon Njuguna Wangai	Kenya	5 May 2002	Broad Street Run	Philadelphia	
23	45:16	Moses Ndiema Masai	Kenya	20 September 2009	Dam tot Damloop	Amsterdam–Zaandam	
23	45:16	Joseph Ebuya	Kenya	24 October 2010		Portsmouth	
23	45:16+	Conner Mantz	United States	19 January 2025	Houston Half Marathon	Houston	

==== Notes ====
Below is a list of other times equal or superior to 45:16:

- Leonard Komon also ran 44:48 (2012).
- Martin Mathathi also ran 44:52 (2009), 44:59 (2010), 45:01 (2006).
- Charles Kamathi also ran 45:16 (2009).

=== Women ===
- Correct as of April 2026.

Rank	Time	Athlete	Nation	Date	Race	Place	Ref.
1	49:49+ Mx	Ruth Chepng'etich	Kenya	9 October 2022	Chicago Marathon	Chicago	
2	49:53 Wo	Taylor Roe	United States	6 April 2025	Cherry Blossom Ten Mile Run	Washington	
—	50:01+ a	Paula Radcliffe	Great Britain	21 September 2003		Newcastle upon Tyne–South Shields	
3	50:05+ Mx	Weini Kelati	United States	19 January 2025	Houston Half Marathon	Houston	
4	50:32	Evaline Chirchir	Kenya	22 September 2019	Dam tot Damloop	Amsterdam-Zaandam	
5	50:35	Irene Cheptai	Kenya	22 September 2019	Dam tot Damloop	Amsterdam-Zaandam	
6	50:37	Asayech Ayichew	Ethiopia	12 April 2026	Cherry Blossom Ten Mile Run	Washington, D.C.	
7	50:39	Linet Masai	Kenya	20 September 2009	Dam tot Damloop	Amsterdam-Zaandam	
8	50:41	Joy Cheptoyek	Uganda	12 April 2026	Cherry Blossom Ten Mile Run	Washington, D.C.	
9	50:42	Emma Grace Hurley	United States	12 April 2026	Cherry Blossom Ten Mile Run	Washington, D.C.	
10	50:43	Eilish McColgan	Great Britain	17 October 2021	Great South Run	Portsmouth	
11	50:45	Lonah Salpeter	Israel	23 September 2018	Dam tot Damloop	Amsterdam-Zaandam	
12	50:46	Dibabe Kuma	Ethiopia	23 September 2018	Dam tot Damloop	Amsterdam-Zaandam	
13	50:48	Selamawit Teferi	Israel	22 September 2019	Dam tot Damloop	Amsterdam-Zaandam	
14	50:50	Lornah Kiplagat	Netherlands	17 September 2006	Dam tot Damloop	Amsterdam-Zaandam	
15	50:51	Hellen Obiri	Kenya	21 September 2025	Dam tot Damloop	Amsterdam-Zaandam	
16	50:52+ Mx	Molly Huddle	United States	14 January 2018	Houston Half Marathon	Houston	
17	50:55	Karissa Schweizer	United States	12 April 2026	Cherry Blossom Ten Mile Run	Washington, D.C.	
18	50:56	Asayech Ayichew	Ethiopia	21 September 2025	Dam tot Damloop	Amsterdam-Zaandam	
19	51:00	Sonia O'Sullivan	Ireland	8 September 2002	Great South Run	Portsmouth	
19	51:00	Adane Anmaw	Ethiopia	6 April 2025	Cherry Blossom Ten Mile Run	Washington	
21	51:04	Emma Grace Hurley	United States	6 April 2025	Cherry Blossom Ten Mile Run	Washington	
22	51:08	Isabella Ochichi	Kenya	18 September 2005	Dam tot Damloop	Amsterdam-Zaandam	
23	51:11	Paula Radcliffe	Great Britain	26 October 2008	Great South Run	Portsmouth	
24	51:13	Susan Chepkemei	Kenya	18 September 2005	Dam tot Damloop	Amsterdam-Zaandam	
25	51:16	Colleen De Reuck	South Africa	5 April 1998	Cherry Blossom Ten Mile Run	Washington, D.C.	

==== Notes ====
Below is a list of other times equal or superior to 51:16:

- Weini Kelati also ran 50:46 (2026).
- Lornah Kiplagat also ran 50:54 (2002).

Several athletes posted times that would qualify for the above list if they were performed in sanctioned events for the 10-mile distance:

- Brigid Kosgei: 49:21 (8/9/2019)
- Mary Jepkosgei Keitany: 50:05 (18/2/2011)

== 10-mile road races ==
Race	Location	Country	Founded
Antwerp 10 Miles	Antwerp	Belgium	1988
Army Ten-Miler	Arlington County, Virginia/Washington, D.C.	United States	1985
Broad Street Run	Philadelphia	United States	1980
Cherry Blossom Ten Mile Run	Washington, D.C.	United States	1973
Frank Duffy Ten Mile	Dublin	Ireland	1978
Crim Festival of Races	Flint, Michigan	United States	1977
Cudahy Classic	Cudahy, Wisconsin	United States	1960
Dam tot Damloop	Amsterdam to Zaandam	Netherlands	1985
Diecimiglia del Garda	Gargnano	Italy	1974
Grand Prix von Bern	Bern	Switzerland	1982
Great South Run	Portsmouth	United Kingdom	1990
Harold Webster Memorial 10 Mile	Hamilton, Ontario	Canada	1920
Kanto 10-Miler	Narita, Chiba	Japan	1937
Kumamoto Kosa 10-Miler	Kōsa, Kumamoto	Japan	1983
Navy Ten Nautical Miler	Millington, Tennessee	United States	2010
Ostend-Bruges Ten Miles	Ostend to Bruges	Belgium	1994
Preston Harriers 10 Mile Road Race	Preston, Lancashire	United Kingdom	1981
Tely 10 Mile Road Race	Newfoundland and Labrador	Canada	1922
Ten Mile Road Race	Thunder Bay	Canada	1910
Tilburg Ten Miles	Tilburg	Netherlands	1988
Virginia 10 Miler	Lynchburg, Virginia	United States	1974

== 10-mile track race progression ==
Best performance progression (men)
Time	Athlete	Club/Country	Date	Venue	Ref.
56:30.0 p	William Sheppard	England	4 Nov 1844	Vauxhall Gardens	
54:21.0 p	John Barlow	England	19 Nov 1844	Hoboken, New Jersey	
53:10.0 p	William Jackson	England	5 Apr 1847	Rosemary Branch Grounds, Peckham	
52:35.0 p (Note: On measuring the track after the race it was found they had run 250 yards over the distance. George Frost, the only other competitor, stopped forty yards before the finish.)	John Levett	England	22 Mar 1852	Copenhagen House Grounds	
52:00.0 p	William Jackson	England	31 May 1852	Copenhagen House Grounds	
51:45.0 p	John Levett	England	11 Oct 1852	Copenhagen House Grounds	
51:26.0 p	Louis Bennett	Seneca	3 Apr 1863	Brompton, London	
51:06.6 p	William Cummings	Paisley	28 Sep 1885	Stamford Bridge	
51:05.2 p +	Harry Watkins	England	16 Sep 1899	Rochdale	
64:05.0	Alfred Wheeler	Gymnastic Society, London	6 May 1871	Tufnell Park	
58:58.0	William Fuller	Thames Hare and Hounds	14 Jul 1873	Lillie Bridge Grounds	
57:41.6	William Fuller	London Athletic Club	25 Sep 1875	Lillie Bridge Grounds	
56:07.0	William Fuller	London Athletic Club	16 Oct 1875	Lillie Bridge Grounds	
54:49.0	James Gibb	South London Harriers	17 Nov 1877	Stamford Bridge	
54:06.5	James Warburton	Stoke Victoria AC	2 Aug 1879	Heywood, Greater Manchester	
52:56.5	Walter George	Moseley Harriers	1 May 1882	Aston Lower Grounds	
52:53.0	Walter George	Moseley Harriers	10 Nov 1883	Stamford Bridge	
51:20.0	Walter George	Moseley Harriers	7 Apr 1884	Stamford Bridge	
50:40.6 +	Alfred Shrubb	Horsham Blue Star Harriers	5 Nov 1904	Glasgow (1st performance ratified by IAAF)	
50:15.0 +	Paavo Nurmi	Finland	7 Oct 1928	Berlin	
49:41.6 +	Viljo Heino	Finland	30 Sep 1945	Turku, Finland	
49:22.2 +	Viljo Heino	Finland	14 Sep 1946	Helsinki, Finland	
48:12.0 +	Emil Zátopek	Czechoslovakia	29 Sep 1951	Prague, Czech Republic	
47:47.0	Basil Heatley	Coventry Godiva Harriers	15 Apr 1961	Hurlingham Park	
47:26.8	Melvyn Batty	Thurrock Harriers	11 Apr 1964	Hurlingham Park	
47:12.8	Ronald Clarke	Australia	3 Mar 1965	Dolomore Oval, Melbourne, Australia	
47:02.2	Ron Hill	Bolton United Harriers	6 Apr 1968	Leicester	
46:44.0 +	Ron Hill	Bolton United Harriers	9 Nov 1968	Leicester	
46:37.4	Jerome Drayton	Canada	6 Sep 1970	Toronto, Canada	
46:04.2	Willy Polleunis	Belgium	20 Sep 1972	Brussels, Belgium	
45:57.2	Jos Hermens	Netherlands	14 Sep 1975	Papendal, Netherlands	
45:23.80	Haile Gebrselassie	Ethiopia	26 Jun 2007	Ostrava, Czech Republic	
44:57.65+	Sabastian Sawe	Kenya	2 September 2022	Brussels, Belgium	

- + = en route in one hour run
- p = professional athlete
