= Athletics at the 1991 Pan American Games – Women's 10,000 metres =

Women's 10,000 metres at the Pan American Games

The women's 10,000 metres event at the 1991 Pan American Games was held in Havana, Cuba on 11 August.

== Results ==
| Rank | Name | Nationality | Time | Notes |
|---|---|---|---|---|
| 1st place, gold medalist(s) | María del Carmen Díaz | Mexico | 34:21.13 | |
| 2nd place, silver medalist(s) | Lisa Harvey | Canada | 34:25.62 | |
| 3rd place, bronze medalist(s) | María Luisa Servín | Mexico | 34:55.94 | |
| 4 | Carmen Furtado | Brazil | 35:20.22 | |
| 5 | Griselda González | Argentina | 35:33.45 | |
| 6 | Emperatriz Wilson | Cuba | 35:47.93 | |
| 7 | Elaine Van Blunk | United States | 36:10.91 | |
| 8 | Colette Murphy | United States | 36:22.24 | |
| 9 | Adelaida Iglesias | Cuba | 37:05.37 | |
| 10 | Sandra Cortez | Bolivia | 37:42.15 | |
