= Athletics at the 1995 Pan American Games – Women's 10,000 metres =

Women's 10,000 metres at the Pan American Games

The women's 10,000 metres event at the 1995 Pan American Games was held at the Estadio Atletico "Justo Roman" on 17 March.

== Results ==
Rank	Name	Nationality	Time	Notes
1st place, gold medalist(s)	Carmem de Oliveira	Brazil	33:10.19	
2nd place, silver medalist(s)	Carol Montgomery	Canada	33:13.58	
3rd place, bronze medalist(s)	María del Carmen Díaz	Mexico	33:14.94	
4	Silvana Pereira	Brazil	33:15.24	
5	Laura LaMena-Coll	United States	33:16.15	
6	María Luisa Servín	Mexico	33:18.36	
7	Gwyn Coogan	United States	33:42.49	
8	Érika Olivera	Chile	34:54.42	
9	Martha Tenorio	Ecuador	34:55.61	
10	Vilma Pailos	Argentina	34:56.90	
	Yesenia Centeno	Cuba	DNF	
	Marilú Salazar	Peru	DNS	
	Elisa Cobañea	Argentina	DNS	
