= Kate Bazeley =

Canadian runner (born 1984)

Personal information
- Born: 1984 (age 41–42) St. John's, Newfoundland, Canada

Sport
- Country: Canada
- Sport: Running
- Events: 5K, 10K, 10 Mile, Half Marathon, Marathon

Achievements and titles
- Personal bests: 16:38 (2018), 34:11 (2018), 55:34 (2016), 1:14:54 (2018), 2:36:35 (2019)

Kate Bazeley (born 1984) is a Canadian road running athlete competing in various long-distance events. In 2016, she set a new record in the Tely 10 for women with a time of 55:34. She has won the Tely 10 numerous times over her career. Kate regularly travels across Canada to compete in other national road running events. She has three daughters.
