= Dan Browne =

American long-distance runner

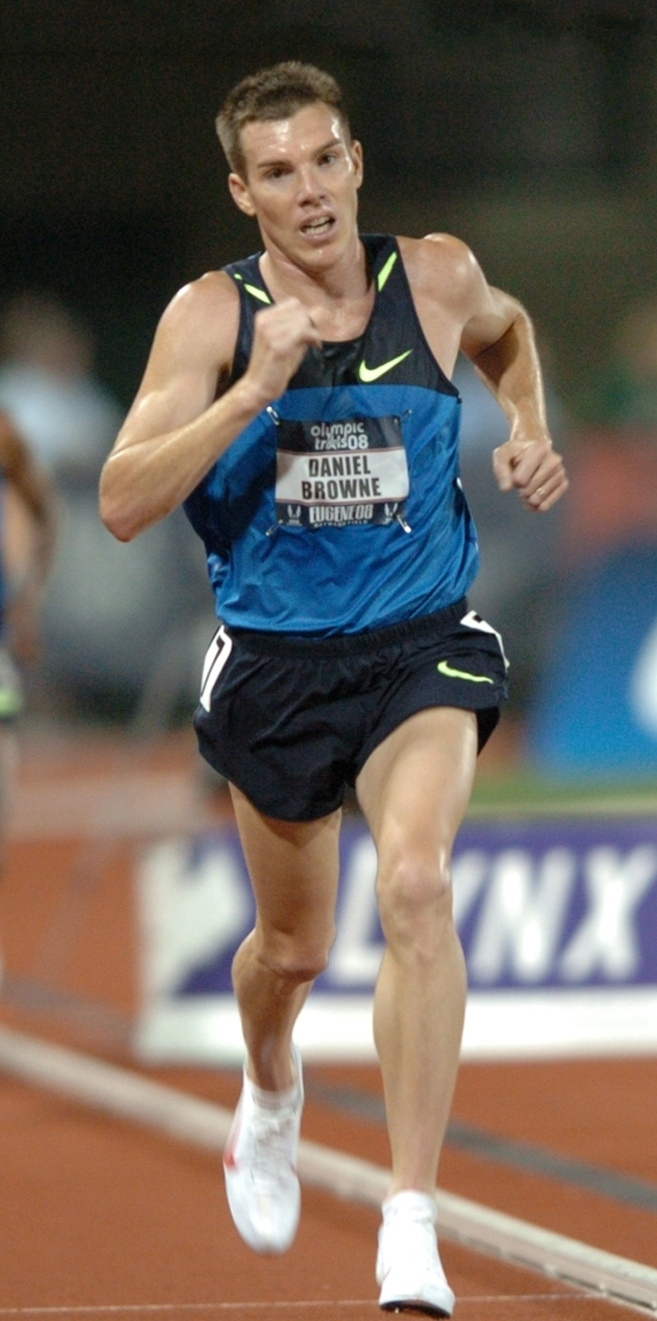
- Browne running 10,000 m at the 2008 Olympic Trials

Personal information
- Born: June 24, 1974 (age 52) Portland, Oregon, United States
- Height: 1.78 m (5 ft 10 in)
- Weight: 66 kg (146 lb)

Sport
- Sport: Running
- Event: 10 km to marathon
- College team: West Point
- Club: Nike, Beaverton
Medal record
Representing United States
Pan American Games
| Bronze medal – third place | 2003 Santo Domingo | 10,000 m |
Summer Universiade
| Silver medal – second place | 1997 Catania | 10,000 m |
| Bronze medal – third place | 1997 Catania | 5000m |
- Updated on 7 May 2018

Daniel J. Browne (born June 24, 1975) is an American distance runner. He has won numerous major American road race championships and was a member of the 2004 Olympic team in the 10 km and marathon.

== Education ==
Browne attended West Linn High School, a suburb of Portland, Oregon, graduating in 1993. He graduated from The United States Military Academy with a major in Spanish & Portuguese and a minor in Systems engineering in 1997.

== Running career ==
Browne first took running seriously while in high school. He attended the United States Military Academy as a member of the class of 1997. While at West Point, he became the only cadet to ever run a mile under four minutes (3:59.37), and set school records in the 3,000, 5,000 and 10,000 meters, which remain unbroken 10 years later. Upon graduating from West Point, he underwent basic officer training before being invited to join the Army's World Class Athlete Program. He moved to Colorado and trained full-time while serving his service commitment in the Colorado National Guard. He won the short course race at the 1998 USA Cross Country Championships. He was later approached by legendary running coach Alberto Salazar about joining the Nike Oregon Project. He now splits time between training Chula Vista, California and living in Oregon. Browne was sponsored by Nike. He made the US Olympic team in 2004 at 10,000 M and Marathon, finishing third in both distances at the trials. He was unsuccessful in a bid to make the 2008 Olympic team. He again attempted to make the 2012 Olympic team in the marathon, but was unsuccessful, completing the race as the last place finisher.

== Personal bests ==
| Event | Time |
|---|---|
| 800 m | 1:49.6 |
| 1500 m | 3:41 |
| Mile | 3:59 |
| 3000 m | 7:46.94 |
| 5000 m | 13:16.02 |
| 10000 m | 27:42.19 |
| 15000 m | 43:56 |
| Half marathon | 1:03.09 |
| Marathon | 2:11.35 |

== International competitions ==
| Year | Competition | Venue | Position | Event | Notes |
|---|---|---|---|---|---|
| 2004 | North American Men's Marathon Relay Championships | Akron, United States | 2nd | Marathon relay | 2:05:39 |

== Road races ==
| Year | Meeting | Location | Event | Result | Time |
|---|---|---|---|---|---|
| 1997 | Army Ten-Miler | Washington, D.C. | 10 Mile | 1st | 47:44 |
| 2002 | USA Marathon Championship | Minneapolis, Minnesota | Marathon | 1st | 2:11:35 |
| 2004 | Army Ten-Miler | Washington, D.C. | 10 Mile | 1st | 47:32 |
| 2007 | USA 5K Road Championships | Providence, Rhode Island | 5K | 1st | 13:47 |
| 2007 | USA 20K Road Championships | New Haven, Connecticut | 20K | 1st | 59:19 |
| 2009 | USA 25K Championships | Grand Rapids, Michigan | 25K | 1st | 1:15:56 |
