= Athletics at the 1930 British Empire Games – Men's marathon =

Men's marathon at the 1930 British Empire Games
- Location: Hamilton, Ontario, Canada

Medalists
gold medal	Dunky Wright	Scotland
silver medal	Sam Ferris	England
bronze medal	Johnny Miles	Canada

The men's marathon event at the 1930 British Empire Games was held on 21 August in Hamilton, Canada with the start and finish at the Civic Stadium.

England's Harry Payne did not finish the race, largely due to being struck by a car when training for the event several days earlier, injuring his head, knee hip and shoulder.

== Results ==
Results of the men's marathon—sortable
Rank	Name	Nationality	Time	Notes
1st place, gold medalist(s)	Dunky Wright	Scotland	2:43:43	
2nd place, silver medalist(s)	Sam Ferris	England	2:47:13e	+800 yd
3rd place, bronze medalist(s)	Johnny Miles	Canada	2:48:23e	
4	Percy Wyer	Canada	?:??:?	
5	Herbert Bignall	England	?:??:?	
6	Silas McLellan	Canada	?:??:?	
7	Norman Dack	Canada	?:??:?	
8	Ronald O'Toole	Newfoundland	?:??:?	
9	Jack O'Reilly	Ireland	?:??:?	
10	Ezra Lee	Canada	?:??:?	
	Jack Cuthbert	Canada	DNF	
	Stan Smith	England	DNF	
	Harry Payne	England	DNF	
	Cliff Stone	Newfoundland	DNF	
	William Mulrooney	Newfoundland	DNF	
