= Athletics at the 1995 Pan American Games – Women's 5000 metres =

Women's 5000 metres at the Pan American Games

The men's 5000 metres event at the 1995 Pan American Games was held at the Estadio Atletico "Justo Roman" on 24 March. This was the first time that this distance was contested by women at the Pan American Games replacing the 3000 metres.

== Results ==
Rank	Name	Nationality	Time	Notes
1st place, gold medalist(s)	Adriana Fernández	Mexico	15:46.32	
2nd place, silver medalist(s)	María del Carmen Díaz	Mexico	15:46.43	
3rd place, bronze medalist(s)	Carol Montgomery	Canada	15:46.80	
4	Sarah Howell	Canada	16:02.59	
5	Misti Demko	United States	16:04.50	
6	Silvana Pereira	Brazil	16:07.16	
7	Érika Olivera	Chile	16:13.76	
8	Yesenia Centeno	Cuba	16:29.06	
9	Elisa Cobañea	Argentina	16:31.24	
10	Ceci St. Geme	United States	16:43.15	
11	Marilu Salazar	Peru	17:04.69	
12	Roxana Coronatti	Argentina	17:46.64	
	Carmem de Oliveira	Brazil	DNS	
	Bigna Samuel	Saint Vincent and the Grenadines	DNS	
