= Bannerman Park =

Public park in St. John's, Newfoundland and Labrador, Canada

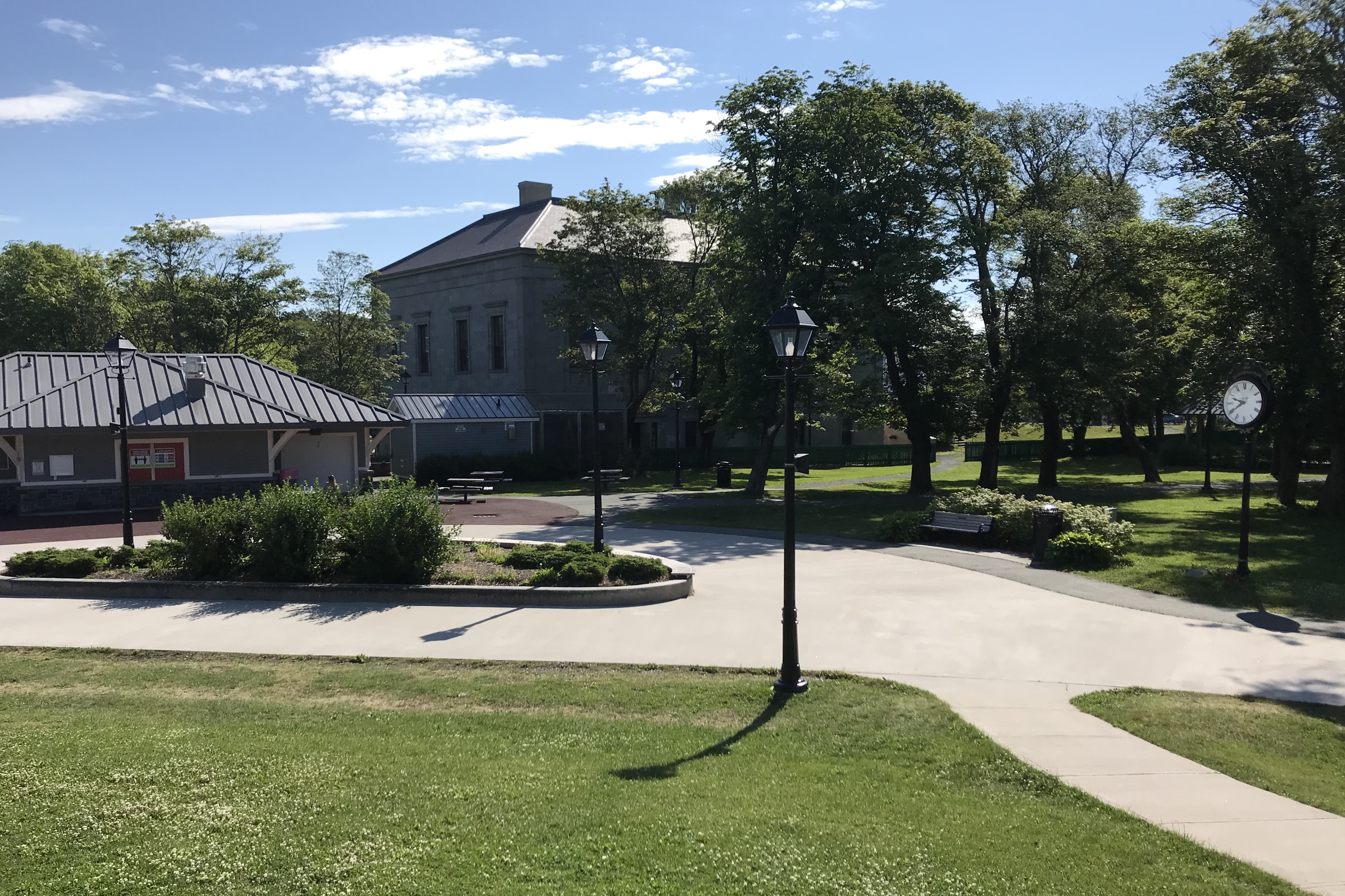
- The Loop viewed from the bandstand with the Colonial Building in the background
- Interactive map of Bannerman Park
- Type: Public park
- Location: St. John's, Newfoundland and Labrador
- Coordinates: 47°34′14″N 52°42′27″W
- Area: 12.6 acres (5.1 ha)
- Established: 1864
- Opened: 1891
- Operator: City of St. John's
- Status: Open year-round

Bannerman Park is a Victorian era urban park located in St. John's, Newfoundland and Labrador. The park is named for Sir Alexander Bannerman, Governor of the Colony of Newfoundland from 1857 to 1864, who assented to an Act establishing the park and donated land for the purpose in 1864. The park occupies the city block bounded by Bannerman Road, Military Road, Rennie's Mill Road, and Circular Road excluding several residential lots carved out of the southwest corner.

== History ==
Bannerman Park was first established as a botanical garden on July 23, 1847, on the barrens between Government House and Rawlin's Cross. The barrens were previously unbuilt except for the Native Hall of the Native Society, the cornerstone of which was laid by Governor Harvey on May 24, 1845, on a site adjacent the present bandstand. The hall and land were being used to house some of those displaced by the Great Fire of 1846 when the hall blew down on September 19, 1846, killing a five- and twenty-year-old sheltering there. The Society's land was subsequently surrendered to the government.

On April 13, 1864, Governor Alexander Bannerman gave assent to an Act establishing Bannerman Park as a public park, the Dominion's first. The garden had been criticized as being too small for the establishment of a proper park, however Bannerman granted access to additional land, both public and private, on the south side of Circular Road. Due to financial constraints the park was unfunded at this time and sat undeveloped for several years.

In the late 1860s the Victoria Rink, a skating rink, was erected within the park on Military Road. A second rink, the Avalon Curling and Skating Rink, was opened on January 4, 1870, by Governor Hill. Of the Avalon rink approximately 4,200 ft^{2} of ice was reserved for curlers and 8,200 ft^{2} for skaters. The Victoria Rink would later come to be known as Exhibition Hall. In June 1872 George E. Wilson opened a theatre in Victoria Rink known as Wilson's New Theatre. One rink was eventually converted by Charles Henry "Professor" Danielle for use as a costume rental. Both burned to the ground on July 17, 1878.

According to Paul O'Neill the first recorded use of the name Bannerman Park was in 1883 despite the fact that the park was still not formally opened at the time. In 1888 St. John's Municipal Council assumed responsibility for the park and committed $10,000 toward landscaping it and Victoria Park on Water Street West. On April 11. 1891, Council opened a design competition for the laying-out of the park as a formal garden with submissions due on the 29th of the same month and a prize of $50. On May 9, 1891, the winning design was announced to be that of local balladeer Johnny Burke. William Joseph Browne, son-in-law of then-councilmember John Harris wrote that the design was actually the work of carpenter William Harris, brother of John, who entered under the name of Burke, his neighbour and friend, to avoid the appearance of impropriety. The design, among other things, included plans for a lake or plot inscribed with the shape of the island of Newfoundland to be installed behind the Colonial Building. Bannerman Park was officially opened on September 1, 1891.

After the Great Fire of 1892 Bannerman Park was again used for housing displaced citizens and a tent city grew there.

On July 3, 1928, local Rotarians opened a pool in the park including changing rooms and a wading pool for small children. On September 6, 1959, the Lions' Club opened a heated outdoor pool.

== Revitalization ==
In 2010 the City of St. John's established the Bannerman Park Foundation to implement the Bannerman Park Master Plan. Thousands attended the "grand re-opening ... on June 21, 2015". The Park's history "was commemorated with major upgrades and improvements as part of a nearly $6 million capital program. Since developing a Park Master Plan in 2003, the Grand Concourse worked with the City of St. John's, the Bannerman Park Foundation, and many generous donors". Between 2012 and 2015 "new entranceways and water features were constructed", "Victorian-style amenities" installed, and planting and landscaping undertaken throughout the Park. "Upgrades included an outdoor skating loop, a new playground, upgrades to the pool area and a new [formal main] entrance".

== Features ==
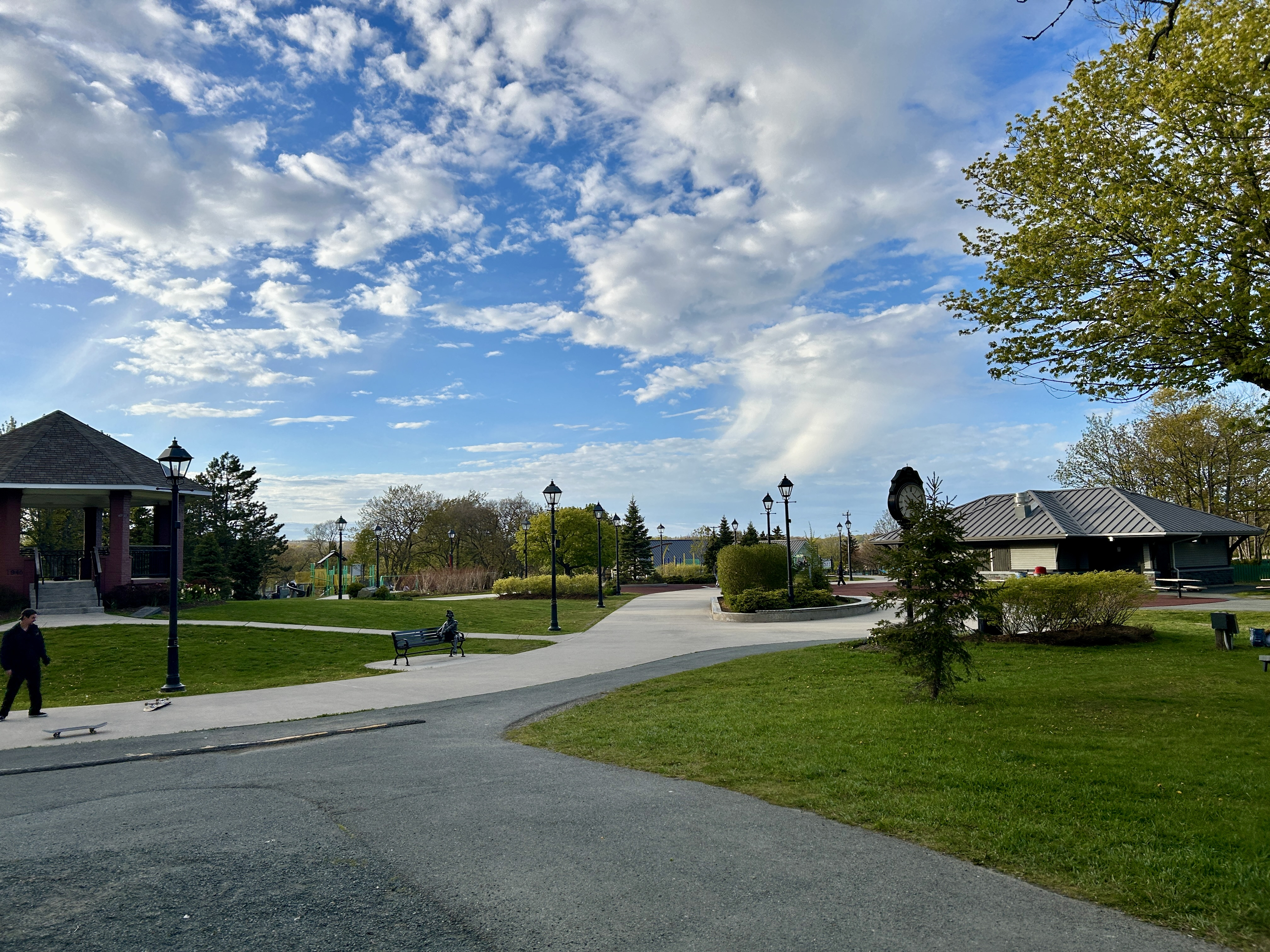
Bannerman Park in 2026

Bannerman Park's current amenities include a baseball field, splash pad, outdoor swimming pool, skating loop, canteen and washroom structure, bandstand, and memory garden. The park is also home to a number of monuments, memorials, and public art installations:

- A ten-foot granite monument and bust commemorates Roman Catholic priest Father Michael Morris, founder of the province's first orphanage at Villa Nova, Manuels, in 1880 and local magazine The Orphan's Friend.
- The official plaque for Parks Canada's Shawnadithit National Historic Person designation.
- A bronze statue by sculptor Morgan MacDonald entitled The Skater was donated by Elinor Gill Ratcliffe in 2016, marking the end of a five-year revitalization project.
- A bronze statue entitled Homecoming, also by MacDonald, was dedicated to surviving members of the Royal Newfoundland Regiment in 2018.

== Events ==
Bannerman Park plays host to many festivals and sporting events, most notably the Newfoundland and Labrador Folk Festival, founded in 1977 as the Bannerman Park Folk Festival. In 1978 British balloonists Donald Cameron and Christopher Davey embarked from the park on the eighteenth known attempt to cross the Atlantic Ocean by balloon. Other notable events include Peace-A-Chord, a free one- and two-day music festival held in the park from 1985 to 2003 and 2005 to 2006. It is the finishing location for the Tely 10 road race.

Bannerman Park is the setting for The Bannerman Quartet, an award-winning, place-based audio fiction developed by Chris Brookes of Battery Radio in 2015. The smartphone app features four stories written by Megan Gail Coles, Joel Thomas Hynes, Sara Tilley, and Michael Winter, performed by Hynes, Allan Hawco, Petrina Bromley, and Lois Brown, and scored by Jake Nicoll. In 2016 it won a Prix Marulic for Special Achievement in Radiophony for Use of New Media.

In 2019 the park was the setting for Other Women Walk, a historical walking tour created by Ruth Lawrence recounting tales of the local suffrage movement. Actors Wendi Smallwood, Monica Walsh, and Marie Jones delivered monologues while playing fictionalized versions of period figures including a housekeeper and sex worker.
