= Elaine Van Blunk =

American long-distance runner

Personal information
- Born: Elaine McGillam; September 11, 1964 (age 62) United States

Sport
- Sport: Athletics
Medal record
Long-distance running
USA Track & Field Indoor Championships
Gold medal – first place	1989 New York City	3000 meters
Marathon
World Marathon Majors
Bronze medal – third place	1994 Chicago	Marathon

Elaine Van Blunk (née McGillam; born September 11, 1964) is an American long-distance runner who finished third at the 1994 Chicago Marathon. She was the 1989 winner of the 3000 meters at the USA Track & Field Indoor Championships, and finished seventh in the 10,000 meters event at the 1991 Pan American Games.

== Personal life ==
Van Blunk attended Archbishop Prendergast High School, and later Saint Joseph's University. She graduated from Saint Joseph's in 1986. She is married to Jim Van Blunk, who was an athlete and later admissions director at Saint Joseph's University. Jim Van Blunk won the 1986 and 1987 Broad Street Run races. Van Blunk has lived in West Deptford Township, New Jersey, and Drexel Hill, Pennsylvania.

== Career ==
Whilst at Archbishop Prendergast High School, Van Blunk competed in Catholic League girl's athletics competitions. In 1981, she finished third in the cross country event, and in 1982, she won the 3,200 meter race in a meeting record time of 11:09.4. Whilst at Saint Joseph's University, Van Blunk qualified for the 1985 NCAA Championships, and in 1986, she became an all-America athlete. After graduating, Van Blunk worked as an accountant, and later as an investigator in Atlantic City, New Jersey for the office of the New Jersey Attorney General. She gave up the role to pursue athletics full time, although she also worked part-time as a track assistant at Saint Joseph's. Van Blunk was sponsored by Nike.

She was the 1989 winner of the 3000 meters event at the USA Track & Field Indoor Championships. In the same year, Van Blunk finished sixth in the Penn Relays mile run. She also won a 3.5 miles (5.6 km) race in Park Avenue, New York City, and a 3.1 miles (5.0 km) event at the Metropolitan Athletics Congress. In 1990, Van Blunk won the 10,000 meters event at the Penn Relays. She finished second in the event in 1991, albeit in a faster time. In 1990, Van Bluck won the 8 km road race at the United States Championships. She competed at the 1991 IAAF World Indoor Championships in Seville, Spain, and placed seventh in the 10,000 meters event at the 1991 Pan American Games. In 1992, Van Blunk won a Dukes invitational 5,000 meters race in a time of 16:04.7. In 1993, Van Blunk set a course record of 1:12:11 at the Fairfield Half-Marathon. She also won the Broad Street Run, in a course record time of 53:15, and the half marathon event at the United States Championships. She also finished 21st in the 10,000 meters event at the 1993 World Championships in Athletics.

In 1994, Van Blunk finished third at the Chicago Marathon, 51 seconds behind winner Kristy Johnston. It was Van Blunk's second career marathon. In 1995, she won the 25 km road race at the United States Championships, and competed in the marathon event at the 1995 World Championships in Athletics, but did not finish the race. In 1997, Van Blunk won the Broad Street Run for the second time.

== International competitions ==
Representing the United States
Year	Competition	Venue	Position	Event	Result	Notes
1990	World Cross Country Championships	Aix-les-Bains, France	34th	Senior race	20:07	
1990	World Cross Country Championships	Aix-les-Bains, France	5th	Senior team	112 pts	
1991	World Cross Country Championships	Antwerp, Belgium	28th	Senior race	21:18	
1991	World Cross Country Championships	Antwerp, Belgium	4th	Senior team	77 pts	
1991	World Indoor Championships	Seville, Spain	8th	3000 m	8:58.23	
1991	Pan American Games	Havana, Cuba	7th	10,000 m	36:10.91	
1993	World Cross Country Championships	Amorebieta-Etxano, Spain	89th	Senior race	21:40	
1993	World Cross Country Championships	Amorebieta-Etxano, Spain	10th	Senior team	167 pts	
1993	World Championships	Stuttgart, Germany	21st	10,000 metres	33:42.85	
1995	World Championships	Gothenburg, Sweden	—	Marathon	DNF	

== Road race wins ==
- Old Kent River Bank Run: 1995
- Cooper River Bridge Run: 1994
- Broad Street Run: 1993, 1997
- Pittsburgh Great Race: 1989

== National titles ==
- USA Indoor Track and Field Championships
  - 3000 m: 1989
