= Victoria Park, St. John's =

Public park in St. John's, Newfoundland and Labrador, Canada

Victoria Park
- Interactive map of Victoria Park
- Type: Public park
- Location: St. John's, Newfoundland and Labrador
- Coordinates: 47°33′06″N 52°43′20″W
- Area: 8.1 acres (3.3 ha)
- Established: 1888
- Operator: City of St. John's
- Status: Open year-round

Victoria Park is a Victorian-era urban park located in St. John's, Newfoundland and Labrador and named for Queen Victoria. The park has street frontage on Water Street, Sudbury Street, Hamilton Avenue (formerly Pokeham Path), and Angel Place, and occupies most of the block bounded by Water Street, Sudbury Street, Hamilton Avenue, Alexander Street.

== History ==
In the early 1800s the land that would become Victoria Park was part of the urban periphery. On June 4, 1813, the cornerstone was laid on the site for a new general hospital by Governor Keats. By 1835 conditions at the hospital had deteriorated considerably and the institution was found to house more of the poor and destitute of the city than the sick. An editorial in 1845 described that it was "heart-rending to behold the accumulation of human misery which [was] to be seen there."

In 1883 Newfoudland's colonial government transferred land at "Riverhead" to the Municipal Council for the establishment of a park in the "west end," and in 1888 the Council of St. John's committed $10,000 to the development of both Bannerman Park in the city's "east end" and Victoria Park in the west. The St. John's or Riverhead Hospital was abandoned the same year and burned down for park development by 1889. By 1890 the grounds of the park were laid out according to the design of city inspector Michael Bambrick and landscaped by gardener Patrick Redmond. After its inauguration Victoria Park became a popular venue for performances by local bands, and paid admission to some helped to fund the erection of a bandstand. The early park also boasted an impressive monument to Moses Monroe: a fifteen-foot high goblet with lions' head fountains pouring into a shallow bowl, as well as the natural cascades of Mullin's Brook descending from Hamilton Avenue. The west side of the brook was under control of the colonial government until access to both sides was granted to the City in exchange for the construction of a sewer.

The cascades once fed a natural pool in the location of the present ballfield. In 1938 Rotarian Anthony Tooton pledged $3,000 toward improvement of the pool in memory of his son, Frank. Work included the addition of a shallow paddling pool alongside the existing. The "Tooton Pool" was again rebuilt starting in 1953 and reopened in 1954. Grading for the sledding hill was also completed around this time. On July 2, 1963, The Lions' Club opened another outdoor pool in the park, their second after that of Bannerman Park. The pool closed in 1996.

The Victoria Park Community Renewal program began in 2016 and is ongoing in 2023. Work to date includes an entrance plaza on Hamilton Avenue, illumination for the sledding hill, a new pedestrian bridge, and new playground equipment.

== Amenities ==
Victoria Park's amenities include a baseball field, sledding hill, playground, dog park, community garden, and a former pool house used by community groups. Other features including a decommissioned World War I-era field gun and bronze monument by Morgan Macdonald entitled "100 Faces of the Great War."

== Friends of Victoria Park ==
The Friends of Victoria Park are a community group established in 1998 following the closure of Victoria Park's public pool two years earlier. The group organizes day camps, operates the pool house, and organisms the Victoria Park Lantern Festival. The Lantern Festival or "Lantern Fest" typically takes place on the last Saturday in July and has been ongoing for more than 20 years.

== See also ==
- Royal eponyms in Canada
