= María del Carmen Díaz =

Mexican long-distance runner

Personal information
- Full name: María del Carmen Díaz Mancilla
- Born: July 15, 1970 (age 56)

Sport
- Sport: Athletics
- Events: 10,000 metres, marathon
Medal record
Women's athletics
Representing Mexico
Pan American Games
Gold medal – first place	1991 Havana	10,000 metres
Silver medal – second place	1991 Havana	3000 metres
Silver medal – second place	1995 Mar del Plata	5000 metres
Bronze medal – third place	1995 Mar del Plata	10,000 metres

María del Carmen Díaz Mancilla (born July 15, 1970) is a retired long-distance runner from Mexico. She competed at the 1996 Summer Olympics in Atlanta, Georgia, where she finished in 33rd place in the women's marathon event. She set a personal best of 2:29:48 hours for the marathon in 1996.

== International competitions ==
Year	Competition	Venue	Position	Event	Notes
Representing Mexico
1986	Central American and Caribbean Junior; Championships (U-20)	Mexico City, Mexico	1st	3000 m	10:16.4 A
1986	Pan American Junior Championships	Winter Park, United States	1st	3000 m	9:42.49
1986	World Junior Championships	Athens, Greece	23rd (h)	3000 m	10:29.58
1986	World Junior Championships	Athens, Greece	10th	10,000 m	36:53.83
1988	Central American and Caribbean Junior; Championships (U-20)	Nassau, Bahamas	1st	1500 m	4:36.37
1988	Central American and Caribbean Junior; Championships (U-20)	Nassau, Bahamas	1st	3000 m	10:06.8
1988	World Junior Championships	Sudbury, Canada	4th	10,000 m	34:23.38
1989	Pan American Junior Championships	Santa Fe, Argentina	2nd	3000 m	9:24.85
1989	Pan American Junior Championships	Santa Fe, Argentina	1st	10,000 m	34:22.83
1989	Central American and Caribbean Championships	San Juan, Puerto Rico	1st	3000 m	9:34.00
1990	Central American and Caribbean Games	Mexico City, Mexico	1st	5000 m	9:30.09
1990	Central American and Caribbean Games	Mexico City, Mexico	1st	10,000 m	35:27.68
1991	Pan American Games	Havana, Cuba	1st	3000 m	9:19.18
1991	Pan American Games	Havana, Cuba	3rd	10,000 m	34:21.13
1991	World Championships	Tokyo, Japan	20th (h)	10,000 m	33:46.24
1992	Ibero-American Championships	Seville, Spain	4th	10,000 m	34:00.08
1993	Central American and Caribbean Games	Ponce, Puerto Rico	1st	10,000 m	34:49.67
1995	Pan American Games	Havana, Cuba	2nd	5000 m	15:46.43
1995	Pan American Games	Havana, Cuba	3rd	10,000 m	33:14.94
1995	World Half Marathon Championships	Montbéliard – Belfort, France	19th	Half marathon	1:12:59
1996	Olympic Games	Atlanta, United States	33rd	Marathon	2:37:14
