= Josh Izewski =

American distance runner (born 1990)

Personal information
- Born: April 25, 1990 (age 36)

Sport
- Country: United States
- Events: Marathon, half marathon
- College team: University of Florida
- Team: ASICS

Achievements and titles
- Personal bests: Marathon: 2:10:54; Half Marathon: 1:02:09; 10 Mile: 45:08

Josh Izewski (born 25 April 1990) is an American distance runner. He participated in the 2020 and 2024 U.S. Olympic Trials in the marathon where he placed 17th and 8th place. He is the 2025 and 2026 winner of the Broad Street Run.

== Early life ==
Izewski was born in Illinois, but spent most of his childhood in Doylestown, Pennsylvania. He began running at age 9 when he joined his father in a local 5K. Izewski attended Central Bucks High School East, where he was a swimmer in addition to running cross country and track. He won a state championship at 3,000 meters on the track. For college, Izewski attended the University of Florida. He ran times of 29:21 for 10,000 meters and 14:02 for 5,000 meters and qualified for both 2010 Outdoor NCAA Championships and 2011 Cross Country NCAA Championship.

== Career ==
Upon graduating from the University of Florida, Izewski turned pro in triathlon where he competed on the ITU circuit. He qualified for and competed in elite international events, including the 2016 ITU World Triathlon Grand Final Cozumel and the ITU Aquathlon World Championships. After his professional triathlon career, he transitioned into elite long-distance running. In 2017, he joined the ZAP Endurance training group. He debuted in the marathon at the 2018 California International Marathon where he ran 2:13:15. This result qualified him for the 2020 United States Olympic Trials (marathon).

At the 2020 Olympic Trials in Atlanta, Izewski ran 2:14:15 to place 17th of 235 men. In 2021, Izewski finished 16th at the Chicago Marathon.

He dropped his marathon time to 2:12:45 at the 2022 Houston Marathon, where he placed eighth. In the fall, he took ninth at the USA 10-Mile Championship in Minnesota.

At the 2024 United States Olympic Trials (marathon) in Orlando, Izewski ran his best marathon time of 2:11:09 to place eighth of 200 men. In the fall of 2024, an injured Izewski placed in the Top 25 at the New York City Marathon.

He finished 2024 ranked in the top 15 in the USA for both the marathon and half marathon.

In 2025, Izewski lowered his marathon time further to 2:10:54 at the Houston Marathon, where he finished ninth. In May of 2025, he won the Broad Street Run in Philadelphia in a time of 46:13.

In 2026, Izewski ran the 2026 Los Angeles Marathon where he finished 4th in 2:14:43 on very hot day. In May of 2026, he successfully defended his title at the Broad Street Run in an American Best time of 45:08.

== Personal ==
As of 2026, Izewski has a professional contract with ASICS. He and his fiancé, Alyssa Vassallo, live in Saddle Brook, NJ where she is a pediatric resident.

Izewski has 4 dogs and he competes in agility competitions with his two border collies.
