= 1986 World Junior Championships in Athletics – Women's 3000 metres =

The women's 3000 metres event at the 1986 World Junior Championships in Athletics was held in Athens, Greece, at Olympic Stadium on 17 and 19 July.

== Medalists ==
Gold	Cleopatra Palacian; Romania
Silver	Philippa Mason; United Kingdom
Bronze	Doina Calenic; Romania

== Results ==
=== Final ===
19 July

Rank	Name	Nationality	Time	Notes
1st place, gold medalist(s)	Cleopatra Palacian	Romania	9:02.91	
2nd place, silver medalist(s)	Philippa Mason	United Kingdom	9:03.35	
3rd place, bronze medalist(s)	Doina Calenic	Romania	9:06.94	
4	Fernanda Ribeiro	Portugal	9:09.39	
5	Christine Sørum	Norway	9:12.26	
6	Anita Håkenstad	Norway	9:12.80	
7	Britta Lorch	West Germany	9:17.77	
8	Sonia Barry	New Zealand	9:19.61	
9	Kerith Duncanson	Australia	9:20.58	
10	Tracy Kennedy	New Zealand	9:21.94	
11	Anzhela Shumeyko	Soviet Union	9:27.51	
12	Anke Breitenbach	West Germany	9:30.42	
13	Agata Nogue	Spain	9:39.19	
14	Ana Oliveira	Portugal	9:47.08	
	Norah Maraga	Kenya	DNF	

=== Heats ===
17 July

==== Heat 1 ====
Rank	Name	Nationality	Time	Notes
1	Doina Calenic	Romania	9:23.41	Q
2	Maiken Sørum	Norway	9:24.06	Q
3	Britta Lorch	West Germany	9:24.78	Q
4	Sonia Barry	New Zealand	9:25.30	Q
5	Ana Oliveira	Portugal	9:25.55	Q
6	Kerith Duncanson	Australia	9:27.96	q
7	Tracy Kennedy	New Zealand	9:29.46	q
8	Regina Chemeli	Kenya	9:42.00	
9	Wendy Neely	United States	9:42.73	
10	Dímitra Anagnostou	Greece	9:47.41	
11	Saori Terakoshi	Japan	9:48.77	
12	María del Carmen Díaz	Mexico	10:29.58	
13	Fanta Camara	Guinea	11:47.6	
14	Gita Basnet	Nepal	12:28.66	

==== Heat 2 ====
Rank	Name	Nationality	Time	Notes
1	Cleopatra Palacian	Romania	9:15.96	Q
2	Philippa Mason	United Kingdom	9:16.32	Q
3	Anita Håkenstad	Norway	9:17.46	Q
4	Anke Breitenbach	West Germany	9:19.07	Q
5	Norah Maraga	Kenya	9:19.26	Q
6	Anzhela Shumeyko	Soviet Union	9:19.27	q
7	Fernanda Ribeiro	Portugal	9:19.82	q
8	Agata Nogue	Spain	9:20.44	q
9	Erin Keough	United States	9:41.00	
10	Heather Ostic	Canada	9:59.38	
11	Susanne Nedergaard	Denmark	10:10.63	
12	Rowena Monton	Philippines	10:48.67	
13	Gabi Morejón	Bolivia	11:20.56	

== Participation ==
According to an unofficial count, 28 athletes from 20 countries participated in the event.

- Australia (1)
- Bolivia (1)
- Canada (1)
- Denmark (1)
- Greece (1)
- Guinea (1)
- Japan (1)
- Kenya (2)
- Mexico (1)
- Nepal (1)
- New Zealand (2)
- Norway (3)
- Philippines (1)
- Portugal (2)
- Romania (2)
- Soviet Union (1)
- Spain (1)
- United Kingdom (1)
- United States (2)
- West Germany (2)
