= Ten Mile Road Race =

Annual road running race held in Thunder Bay, Ontario, Canada

The Ten Mile Road Race is an annual road running race held in Thunder Bay, Ontario, Canada. It originated in 1910, and follows a route linking Port Arthur and Fort William. The race draws about 700 runners, and is held annually on Victoria Day, a Canadian national holiday. This holiday occurs on the 3rd Monday in May.

== History ==
The Ten Mile Road Race in Thunder Bay has a history that dates back to 1910. It is the oldest 10 mile road race in Canada, predating the Tely 10 mile road race held in St John's, Newfoundland and Labrador since 1922. The Fort William Daily Times-Journal, a local newspaper, announced in April 1910 that it would sponsor an annual road race with the purpose of promoting "healthy and clean sport at the head of the lakes". The streets were lined with spectators along the entire route. The inaugural race was won by J.E. Edwards of Port Arthur in a time of 57 minutes.

The Times-Journal went on to provide sponsorship for the race until 1915 when World War I forced the cancellation of the event. It was reinstated in 1920. During the 1930s the race continually drew a great deal of public interest. The number of entrants was consistently higher than in previous years (an average of 30 runners in 1930s vs. an average of 12 runners in the 1920s).

World War II caused the race to end for 10 years. On Victoria Day 1949, one decade after the last race, the Ten Mile Road race was revived and organized by Branch 6 of the Royal Canadian Legion. A mere seven runners toed the line in that race, the lowest turnout ever. In the 1950s the race was not held as interest waned.

In 1963, Branch 6 revived the Ten Mile Road Race one more time. Competitors and the public demonstrated that there was renewed interest in the race. In 1966 Gary Young entered the ten mile race for the first time, even through he did not finish that first year he has surpassed the saying if you do not first succeed, try, try, try again. In 1967 Gary Young finished his first 10-mile race at the age of 15, placing 10th overall in a time of 67:42. The following year at the age of 16, Gary came 4th overall in a time of 58:53. In 1969 at the age of 17 he won in a time of 56:15. Since then Gary has won more awards in the annual road race than any other runner. In 1976 finishing second overall Gary ran his fastest time in 51:36. Gary has finished second twice and third twice. Gary Young has finished the ten mile race fifty two times plus in 1978 the 10 mile race committee added the Canadian 20 kilometer championship in which Gary finished 3rd overall in a time of 67:24, making 53 times finishing ten miles on Victoria day. Gary has finished the ten mile race under one hour thirty-one times. In 2004, Gary Young became the oldest Thunder Bay runner to finish the race under one hour at the age of 52, (3 days short of his 53rd birthday), Gary ran 59:18. Gary now holds the world record for most annual 10 mile races completed. Gary is still competing as of 2020. The world record for most annual road races is 58 held by marathon runner John Kelley (deceased). The world record for most annual races (cross country) completed is 67 by Jack Kirk (deceased). In 1968, the first female competitor ran in the Ten Mile Road Race: Frances Blanche of Marathon, Ontario. Awards and separate categories for female runners were not initiated until the late 1970s. The fastest time to date for a local female athlete is Sue Kainulainen (58:30 in 1984). She went on to win the women's division seven times. In 1970, the event took on a higher profile as it became the National 10 Mile Championship won by Robert Moore. In 1973 Thunder Bay`s Bill Britten ran the 10 mile in 49:13 while living and training in the city of Thunder Bay. In 1975 Jim Trapp also a native of Thunder Bay came back to Thunder Bay after attending Northern Arizona University and ran in a winning time of 49:04. Bill Britton came 2nd in 1975 in a time of 49:26. In 1978 the 10 mile race committee added a second race, the Canadian 20 Kilometre Championship. This race started before the 10 mile. Bill Britten won in 63:47, Jim Fethers was second in 66:04 and Gary Young placed third in 67:24. Only one woman ran the 20 km. race, Marilyn Fraser ran 93:23. Unfortunately most runners in Thunder Bay raced the 10 mile, and the 20 km. race was a big disappointment to the 10 mile road race committee. Since the 1978 race all 10 mile race committees and race directors up to 2016 have failed to recognize the Canadian 20 kilometre event on the Thunder Bay Fire Fighters 10 mile web site. In the 1970s many of the country's top runners traveled to Thunder Bay and provided some of the fastest and most competitive racing the event has ever seen. Some of these runners were Dan Shaughnessy, Brian Armstrong, Robert Moore, and Jerome Drayton (a past winner of Boston Marathon).

The nature of the race gradually began to expand, from a highly competitive elite event to one encompassing runners of all ability levels. This took place with the beginning of the running boom in the 1970s. Up until this time, the largest number of participants was about 80. Into the 1980s, the numbers of participants increased to 300 or so runners taking on the 10 mile distance. In 1989 Lakehead University sponsored the race with the help of Branch 6 of the Royal Canadian Legion and other supporters. They continued their sponsorship for the next five years. Bell Canada came on board in 1992 and 1993. The torch was then passed to Shoppers Drug Mart who contributed financial and volunteer support for the next 10 years. In 2004, the 71st running of the 10 Mile Road Race welcomed the Thunder Bay Professional Firefighters Association as the next title sponsor. In 2009, Half Way Motors stepped forward to become a presenting sponsor with the Firefighters continuing as the title sponsors.

In 1981, a pre-race pasta dinner was added to the venue. It has continued to attract runners, organizers, volunteers along with their families and friends to come together to dine and share stories of past races. In 2009 the race had 714 individual runners and 150 more for relays. Eighty-Six races started with a mass start and normal race procedures. On March 20, 2020 because of the epidemic Covid-19 Virus the Firefighters, Fresh Air sponsored 10 mile road race was cancelled; but the next day a virtual Victoria Day 10 Mile was started by Gary Young. This 87th road race had 59 competitors who paid no entry fee and was raced under the toughest conditions runners had ever experienced in a road race. Runners who entered raced without all the following: bib number, race starter, timer, competitors beside them or in front of them or back of them, spectators, aid stations, closed streets, prizes and there was no one to help them if they had health problems while racing. Runners were racing alone and against the clock. This was a race in a pandemic. It was suggested that entries donate to the Thunder Bay Community Fund and many of the entries did donate. The first overall male runner was Connor Macintosh in a time of 54:45 followed closely by his brother Michael in 54:59. Third overall in the men`s race was Scott Wiebe 57:49. The first overall female runner was Jennifer Pasiciel in 1:10:02 followed by Jodie Ferguson in 1:11:43 and third overall in the woman`s race was Heidi McGee in 1:18:23. Gary Young finished in 1:35:34 for his 53 ten mile race ran on Victoria Day. The low turn out of runners for the virtual Victoria Day 10 Mile Road Race was because of the difficulty of letting runners know the race was actually going to be raced because with obeying strict health rules many runners were unaware of the event.

== Course ==
The current race route is an out and back course and has runners running up and down an overpass bridge twice, making the course more difficult than necessary. Although there have been minor modifications in the course over the years, it continues the tradition of offering a route that connects the two former cities of Fort William and Port Arthur. The course is not a fast course and has never been certified.

The race starts on Simpson Street near the intersection with Donald Street and follows Simpson Street as it turns into Fort William Road and then into Water Street. At this point the route turns onto Marina Park Drive and the runners experience a clear view from the top of the overpass of Lake Superior and the Sleeping Giant. The route goes a short distance into Marina Park where it reaches the mid way turning point. The roads along the course are closed to all vehicular traffic with barricades and volunteers at each intersection. Spectators have easy of access to all sectors of the route with sight lines of the runners on the outward leg and homeward leg of the race.

The Columbus Centre at the corner of May and Arthur Streets serves as the race centre. It provides the venue for the race registrations, the pre-race pasta dinner, and change rooms and the awards event after the race.

The race has and continues to be held on the Victoria Day holiday which occurs on the last Monday on or before May 24. It begins at 9:00 AM to ensure that the runners have a comfortable temperature for the run and the roads can be reopened to traffic before the busier part of the day. The Thunder Bay 10 Mile Road Race celebrated its 75th running in 2008.

== Records ==
- Male Open - Pekka Päivärinta, Finland 47:09 1975
- Female Open - Erja Ervonen, Finland 57:16 1994

Four Thunder Bay athletes have excelled in this race. Sue Kainulainen has the record for the most victories (7) in the women's division. Jonathon Balabuck has posted 5 consecutive victories in the men's division. Gary Young has the most annual races competed with 53 and has won more awards than any other runner. Bill Britten has run four sub 50 minute ten mile races, 1973, 1974, 1975, 1976 and has the highest age graded performance of all Thunder Bay runners at 91.62 percent. In all previous races only one other Thunder Bay runner has raced under 50 minutes.
