= Stan Smith (athlete) =

Personal information
- Nationality: British (English)
- Born: 24 April 1904 West Bromwich, England
- Died: 1986 (aged 81–82) Kidderminster, England

Sport
- Sport: Athletics
- Event: long-distance
- Club: Birchfield Harriers; Halesowen AC

Stanley Howard Smith (24 April 1904 – 1986) was an English athlete who competed at the 1930 British Empire Games.

== Biography ==
Smith was born in West Bromwich, England, and was a member of the Birchfield Harriers.

He represented England at the 1930 British Empire Games in Hamilton, Ontario, where he competed in the marathon event. At the time of the Games he was a mechanic by trade and lived at 570 Hagley Road in Birmingham.

Smith also won the prestigious Polytechnic Marathon in 1930 and finished runner-up behind Dunky Wright at the 1931 AAA Championships from Windsor to Stamford Bridge.

In later years, Smith was involved with Halesowen AC.
