= Anita Håkenstad =

Norwegian mountain runner

Personal information
- Nationality: Norwegian
- Born: 19 February 1968 (age 58) Oslo, Norway

Sport
- Country: Norway
- Sport: Sport of athletics; Mountain running
- Event: Long-distance running
Medal record
Mountain running
Event	1st	2nd	3rd
World LD Championships (individual)	1	0	0
Total	1	0	0

Anita Håkenstad (born 19 February 1968) is a Norwegian long-distance runner who specialized in marathon races and cross-country running. She now competes in mountain running.

Her highest place from the IAAF World Cross Country Championships was a 30th place from 1986. The same year she finished sixth in the 3000 metres at the inaugural World Junior Championships in Athletics. In the World Cross Country team competition her highest place was sixth in 1987. In the marathon she finished 48th at the 1996 Summer Olympics and competed at the World Championships in 1995 and 1997 without managing to finish. She became Norwegian champion in 5000 metres in 1987, and in half marathon in 1996.

== Personal bests ==
- 5000 metres - 15:44.66 min (1992) - tenth among Norwegian 5000 m runners.
- Half marathon - 1:12:21 hrs (1996) - eleventh among Norwegian half marathon runners.
- Marathon - 2:30:08 hrs (1996) - fifth among Norwegian marathon runners, only behind Ingrid Kristiansen, Grete Waitz, Stine Larsen and Kirsten Otterbu.

== Achievements ==
Year	Competition	Venue	Position	Event	Notes
Representing Norway
1986	World Junior Championships	Athens, Greece	6th	3000m	9:12.80
1995	World Championships	Gothenburg, Sweden	—	Marathon	DNF
1996	Olympic Games	Atlanta, United States	48th	Marathon	2:43:58
1997	Stockholm Marathon	Stockholm, Sweden	1st	Marathon	2:33:26
1997	World Championships	Athens, Greece	—	Marathon	DNF
2007	Jungfrau Marathon	Interlaken, Switzerland	1st	Marathon	3:23:06
