= Jane Ngotho =

Kenyan long-distance runner

Personal information
- Born: 29 November 1969 (age 56)
- Height: 1.63 m (5 ft 4 in)
- Weight: 45 kg (99 lb)

Sport
- Country: Kenya
- Sport: Athletics
- Events: 3000 m; 10,000 m

Achievements and titles
- Personal bests: 3000 m: 8:44.14; 10,000: 32:08.54
Medal record
Women's athletics
Representing Kenya
African Championships
Gold medal – first place	1989 Lagos	10,000 m
Silver medal – second place	1989 Lagos	3000 m
Silver medal – second place	1990 Cairo	10,000 m
World Junior Championships
Gold medal – first place	1988 Sudbury	10,000 m

Jane Ngotho Wanjiku (born 29 November 1969) is a former Kenyan long-distance runner who specialised in 3000 metres, and 10,000 metres events. She won three medals in two different editions of the African Championships in 1989 and 1990, including one gold in 10,000 metres at the 1989 African Championships in Athletics in Lagos. She also competed for Kenya in the 1992 Summer Olympics in 3,000 metres, but did not progress to the finals.

== Achievements ==
Year	Competition	Venue	Position	Event	Notes
1988	World Junior Championships	Sudbury, Canada	1st	10,000 m	33:49.45
1989	African Championships	Lagos, Nigeria	1st	10,000 m	33:05.60
1989	African Championships	Lagos, Nigeria	2nd	3000 m	9:15.43
1990	African Championships	Cairo, Egypt	2nd	10,000 m	33:39.26
1991	World Championships	Tokyo, Japan	21st	10,000 m	33:36.91
1992	Summer Olympics	Barcelona, Spain	22nd (h)	3000 m	9:00.96
