= Joel Onwonga =

Kenyan long-distance runner

Joel Onwonga (born 29 December 1972), also spelled Joel Onwong'a, is a Kenyan long-distance runner, best known for winning the 1996 Twin Cities Marathon in 2:13:13.

== Running career ==
Onwonga start running competitively at age 20. One of his first big races was the California International Marathon, where he placed 3rd. From there, Onwonga went around the country to compete in other races.

Onwonga competed in the Twin Cities Marathon three times. In 1995, he was favored to win. During the race, there were reports that he was tripped by another runner, which dropped him from the lead. He finished third as Rafael Zepeda took first place. In 1996, Onwonga placed first in the Twin Cities Marathon, crossing the line in 2:13:13. Also in 1996, Onwonga won the Broad Street Run, a 10-mile run in Philadelphia, where he lived at the time.

After 1996, Onwonga ran a handful of other marathons; Stockholm Marathon, Houston Marathon, and Columbus Marathon. He placed at least in the top six for the rest of his career, but never won another marathon.

== Early and personal life ==
Onwonga was born in Kenya. Following in his father's footsteps, he started running at a young age. He attended the Kenya College of Communications and Technology. After college, he moved to Pennsylvania, living in both Norristown and Philadelphia. He was married in 1996.

== Achievements ==
Year	Competition	Venue	Position	Event	Notes
1995	California International Marathon	Sacramento, California	3rd	Marathon	2:15:22
1995	Twin Cities Marathon	Minneapolis–Saint Paul, Minnesota	3rd	Marathon	2:15:40
1996	Twin Cities Marathon	Minneapolis–Saint Paul, Minnesota	1st	Marathon	2:13:13
1996	Broad Street Run	Philadelphia, Pennsylvania	1st	10 mile	47:27*
1997	Twin Cities Marathon	Minneapolis–Saint Paul, Minnesota	5th	Marathon	2:17:07
1997	Stockholm Marathon	Stockholm, Sweden	6th	Marathon	2:20:44
1998	Houston Marathon	Houston, Texas	4th	Marathon	2:14:42
1998	Columbus Marathon	Columbus, Ohio	4th	Marathon	2:19:00

- in article, last name is spelled Onwoniga

== See also ==
- Twin Cities Marathon
- Houston Marathon
- Stockholm Marathon
- California International Marathon
