= Benard Kibet =

Kenyan athlete

Benard Kibet Koech
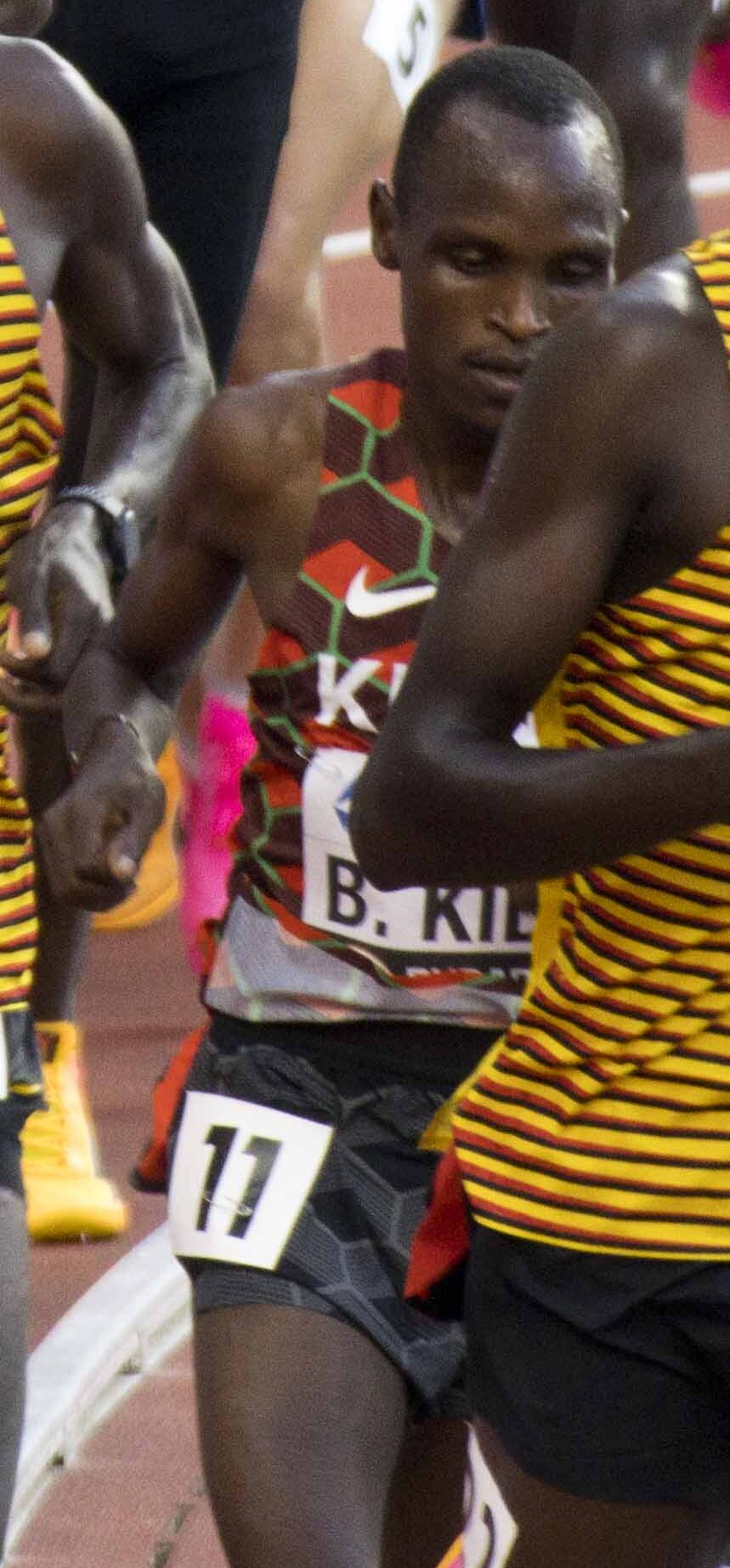
- Benard Kibet in 2023

Personal information
- Nationality: Kenyan
- Born: 30 July 1999 (age 26) Kericho, Kenya

Sport
- Sport: Athletics
- Event: Long-distance running

Benard Kibet Koech (born 25 November 1999) is a Kenyan long-distance runner. He holds the world best performance for the 10-mile run with a time of 44:04 set at the Kosa 10-Miler in December 2022. Koech is currently serving a four-year doping suspension set to expire in June 2029 for Athlete Biological Passport discrepancies.

Koech was born in Kericho and currently lives and trains in Japan. He placed 5th in the 10,000 metres at the 2023 World Athletics Championships.

== Personal bests ==
Outdoor

- 5000 metres – 13:00.38 (Nobeoka 2023)
- 10,000 metres – 26:43.98 (Paris 2024)

Road

- 5K – 13:21 (Fukuoka 2022)
- 10 miles – 44:04 (Kosa 2022) WBP, ABP
- Half marathon – 58:45 (Ras Al Khaimah 2023)
