= Tely 10 Mile Road Race =

Canadian annual road race

The Tely 10 Mile Road Race (generally known as the Tely 10) is a 10 mile road race held in the communities of Paradise, Mount Pearl and St. John's, Newfoundland and Labrador, Canada that attracts over 4000 runners annually. The race course often gets mistaken as 10 km. The race began in 1922 making it one of the oldest road races in all of Canada. The race was not run from 1940 to 1945 because of World War II; thus, the 2019 race was the 92nd in the event's history. Due to the COVID-19 pandemic, the in-person 2020 edition was also cancelled, and the 2021 event was held on October 31. The 2022 event was held on October 8, during Thanksgiving weekend.

Course record holders are Andrew Davies (46:51 in 2026) and Anne Johnston (54:25 in 2019).

The race is held every fourth Sunday in June. The sponsor of the race is The Telegram, from which the race draws its name. The race commences on Topsail Road in the Town of Paradise, continues into the City of Mount Pearl, and into St. John's where it finishes at Bannerman Park in downtown of St. John's. The majority of the course follows Topsail Road).

The 98th and most recent race was held on June 28, 2026. Andrew Davies won the Men's race (46:51 min) and was the overall race winner. Kate Bazeley won the Women's race (55:46 min).

The next race will be held on June 27, 2027.

== Winners ==
Men's race
Year	Winner	Time
2026	Andrew Davies	46:51
2025	Levi Moulton	50:28
2024	Callum Drever	50:37
2023	Noah Defreyne	53:40
2022	Jordan Fewer	53:29
2021	Colin Fewer	50:52
2020	No Race (COVID-19 pandemic)	N/A
2019	Colin Fewer	49:49
2018	Colin Fewer	52:05
2017	Colin Fewer	49:41
2016	Colin Fewer	50:26
2015	Matt Loiselle	49:28
2014	Colin Fewer	50:52
2013	Daniel McNeil	51:11
2012	Matt Loiselle	48:09
2011	Colin Fewer	51:19
2010	Colin Fewer	49:48
2009	Colin Fewer	50:38
2008	Colin Fewer	50:22
2007	Colin Fewer	50:11
2006	Colin Fewer	51:28
2005	Colin Fewer	52:05
2004	Chris Holden	52:44
2003	Trevor O'Brien	51:26
2002	Trevor O'Brien	51:14
2001	Chris Holden	50:44
2000	Trevor O'Brien	53:06
1999	Scott Young	51:28
1998	Scott Young	54:26
1997	Scott Young	50:32
1996	Paul McCloy	49:52
1995	Ernie Lucas	50:31
1994	Dave Ruggles	51:07
1993	Paul McCloy	47:55
1992	Paul McCloy	51:13
1991	Harold St. Croix	49:50
1990	Harold St. Croix	51:15
1989	Peter Lewis	50:53
1988	Harold St. Croix	52:26
1987	Harold St. Croix	52:28
1986	Dave Whittle	50:56
1985	Paul McCloy	47:04
1984	Peter Lewis	50:25
1983	Geoff Thompson	50:33
1982	Greg Grondin	50:06
1981	Geoff Thompson	51:28
1980	Paul McCloy	49:37
1979	Art Meaney	53:02
1978	John Hill	51:03
1977	Harold St. Croix	52:06
1976	Harold St. Croix	54:50
1975	Ben Dunne	56:00
1974	Mike Greene	56:17
1973	Dave Thomas	54:01
1972	Bren Kelly	1:07:58
1971	Dan Clarke	50:35
1970	Dan Clarke	50:07
1969	Joe Ryan	58:25
1968	Ken Rice	1:10:37
1967	Don Coaker	58:20
1966	Don Coaker	56:10
1965	Don Coaker	59:18
1964	Don Coaker	57:00
1963	Don Coaker	56:13
1962	Don Coaker	55:19
1961	Charlie Spurrell	1:00:03
1960	George Crane	1:00:05
1959	Jim Jackson	59:06
1958	Johnny Lafferty	55:19
1957	Jim Jackson	59:44
1956	George Hillier	54:59
1955	George Hillier	54:39
1954	George Hillier	54:28
1953	George Hillier	55:35
1952	George Hillier	57:36
1951	George Hillier	59:18
1950	George Hillier	55:40
1949	Johnny Lafferty	54:15
1948	Bern Thistle	56:52
1947	Pat Kelly	57:12
1946	Pat Kelly	56:03
1940-1945	No Races (World War II)	N/A
1939	Pat Kelly	55:13
1938	Pat Kelly	55:43
1937	Pat Kelly	56:58
1936	Pat Kelly	55:35
1935	Pat Kelly	54:10
1934	Pat Kelly	56:50
1933	Pat Kelly	56:24
1932	Cliff Stone	54:34
1931	Cliff Stone	55:08
1930	Cliff Stone	53:09
1929	Cliff Stone	52:58
1928	Cliff Stone	53:40
1927	Cliff Stone	54:17
1926	Cliff Stone	55:50
1925	Ron O'Toole	56:32
1924	Ron O'Toole	57:05
1923	Ron O'Toole	55:59
1922	Jack Bell	56:35

Women's race
Year	Winner	Time
2026	Kate Bazeley	55:46
2025	Kate Bazeley	53:42
2024	Kate Bazeley	55:50
2023	Kate Bazeley	54:55
2022	Kate Bazeley	56:10
2021	Kate Bazeley	55:06
2020	No Race (COVID-19 pandemic)	N/A
2019	Anne Johnston	54:25
2018	Jennifer Murrin	56:59
2017	Jennifer Murrin	57:16
2016	Kate Bazeley	55:34
2015	Anne Johnston	58:58
2014	Kate Vaughan-Bazeley	55:57
2013	Lisa Harvey	1:00:26
2012	Lisa Harvey	58:58
2011	Kate Vaughan	57:43
2010	Kate Vaughan	56:36
2009	Lisa Harvey	57:41
2008	Lisa Harvey	57:35
2007	Lisa Harvey	58:11
2006	Lisa Harvey	57:12
2005	Caroline Mcilroy	1:01:42
2004	Anne Barrington	58:52
2003	Lisa Harvey	59:19
2002	Anne Barrington	1:00:59
2001	Allison Hobeika	1:04:52
2000	Allison Hobeika	1:05:04
1999	Marie Decker	1:02:43
1998	Noeleen Wadden	1:03:21
1997	Susan King	1:04:01
1996	Pam Bulgin	1:04:14
1995	Tracey Pope	1:05:56
1994	Isabelle Turcotte	59:27
1993	Noeleen Wadden	1:00:02
1992	Noeleen Wadden	1:00:31
1991	Sue Malone	1:03:25
1990	Noeleen Wadden	58:53
1989	Helen Piccinini	1:02:40
1988	Noeleen Wadden	58:53
1987	Nicola Will	1:05:40
1986	Nicola Will	55:47
1985	Diane Drapper	1:08:53
1984	Nicola Will	56:04
1983	Susanne Hanna	1:06:28
1982	Nicola Will	1:00:51
1981	Sheila Currie	1:02:05
1980	Sheila Currie	57:13
1979	Colleen Martin	1:06:04
1978	Colleen Martin	1:07:53
1977	Colleen Martin	1:05:28
1976	Colleen Martin	1:07:22
1975	Cindy French	1:25:50
1974	Gail Vincent	1:27:24
1973	Bonnie Reid	1:15:48
1972	no female entries	-
1971	Gail Vincent	unknown
1970	Jackie Kean	1:16:39
1969	Jackie Kean	1:34:46
