= 1989 USA Indoor Track and Field Championships =

National athletics championship event

- Dates: February 24
- Host city: New York City, New York, United States
- Venue: Madison Square Garden
- Level: Senior
- Type: Indoor
- Events: 26 (14 men's + 12 women's)

The 1989 USA Indoor Track and Field Championships were held at Madison Square Garden in New York City, New York. Organized by The Athletics Congress (TAC), the competition took place on February 24 and served as the national championships in indoor track and field for the United States.

The competition acted as a qualifier for the U.S. team at the 1989 World Indoor Championships in Athletics. At the meeting, Jackie Joyner-Kersee's winning streak of six races in the 55 m hurdles, an event which Joyner-Kersee held the world record in, was ended by Kim McKenzie. It was also the first time that the women's weight throw was contested.

== Medal summary ==
=== Men ===
Event	Gold		Silver		Bronze	
55 m	Leroy Burrell	6.15				
400 m	Antonio McKay	47.03				
500 m	Mark Rowe	1:01.59				
800 m	Ray Brown	1:46.77				
Mile run	Frank O'Mara (IRL)	3:58.58	Marcus O'Sullivan (IRL)	3:59.24	Jeff Atkinson	4:00.03
3000 m	Steve Scott	7:53.69				
55 m hurdles	Tonie Campbell	6.98				
High jump	Troy Kemp (BAH)	2.30 m	Thomas McCants	2.30 m		
Pole vault	Rodion Gataullin (URS)	5.85 m	Billy Olson	5.70 m		
Long jump	Larry Myricks	8.23 m				
Triple jump	Mike Conley	17.32 m				
Shot put	Randy Barnes	20.88 m				
Weight throw	Lance Deal	22.46 m				
5000 m walk	Tim Lewis	20:00.46				

=== Women ===
Event	Gold		Silver	Bronze
55 m	Gwen Torrence	6.61		
200 m	Alice Jackson	23.64		
400 m	Diane Dixon	53.28		
800 m	Joetta Clark	2:02.60		
Mile run	Linda Sheskey	4:43.09		
3000 m	Elaine van Blunk	9:16.46		
55 m hurdles	Kim McKenzie	7.39		
High jump	Louise Ritter	1.96 m		
Long jump	Jennifer Inniss	6.41 m		
Shot put	Ramona Pagel	19.06 m		
Weight throw	Virginia Young	18.34 m		
3000 m walk	Teresa Vaill	13:12.74		
