= Colin Fewer =

Canadian long-distance runner

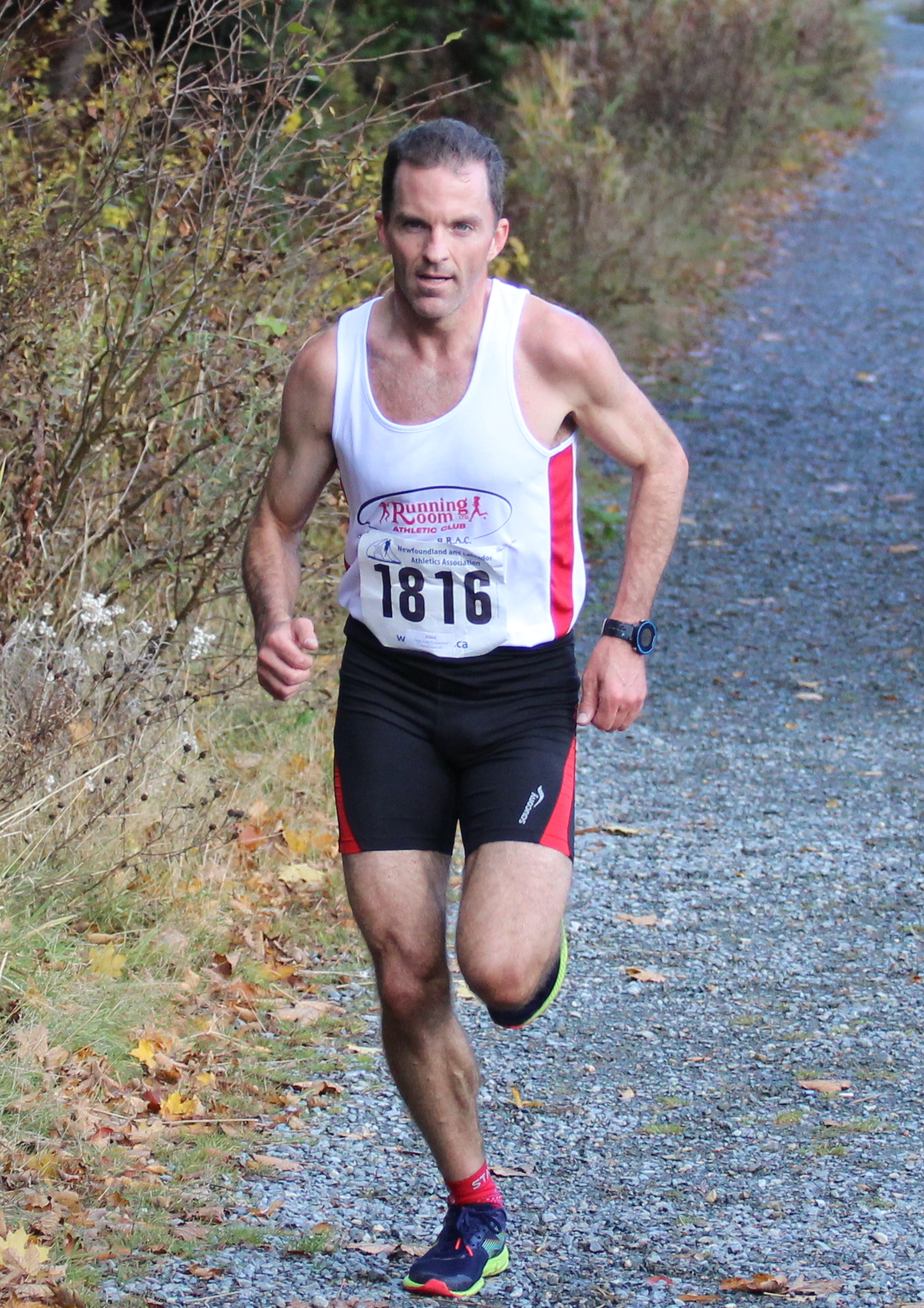
- Fewer at the halfway point of an NLAA XC event.

Personal information
- Born: June 15, 1977 (age 49) St. John's, Newfoundland and Labrador

Sport
- Country: Canada
- Sport: Running
- Event(s): 5K, 10K, 10 Mile, Half Marathon
- Club: Athletics NorthEAST

Achievements and titles
- Personal best(s): 15:07 (2017), 30:27 (2011), 49:41 (2017), 1:06:53 (2018)

Colin Fewer (born June 15, 1977) is a Canadian road running athlete competing in various long-distance events. He has represented Canada nationally on a number of occasions. Fewer frequently travels to road running events in other parts of Canada, and around the world. In 2019, he set a new record for Tely 10 wins (12), and beat Pat Kelly's previously held record of 9. Colin is currently sponsored by the Running Room, and he has been sponsored by Saucony in the past. Fewer is currently a gym teacher at Mary Queen Of Peace Elementary School.
