= Cliff Stone =

Newfoundlander competitive runner

Clifford Stone (1906 – April 1969) was a middle- and long-distance runner from Newfoundland. He was born in Fogo, Notre Dame Bay, Newfoundland Colony. Stone was the winner of The Evening Telegram Ten-Mile Road Race each year from 1926 to 1932, and set a race record of 52:58 in 1929 which stood for forty years.

Stone represented Newfoundland at the 1930 British Empire Games and held Newfoundland records for the half-mile, one-mile, five-mile and ten-mile distances. He was a member of the Newfoundland team that placed first in the Maritime competition on two occasions.

Stone was denied a chance to compete in the Olympics as the Dominion of Newfoundland lacked a National Olympic Committee.
