= Broad Street Run =

Road race in Philadelphia

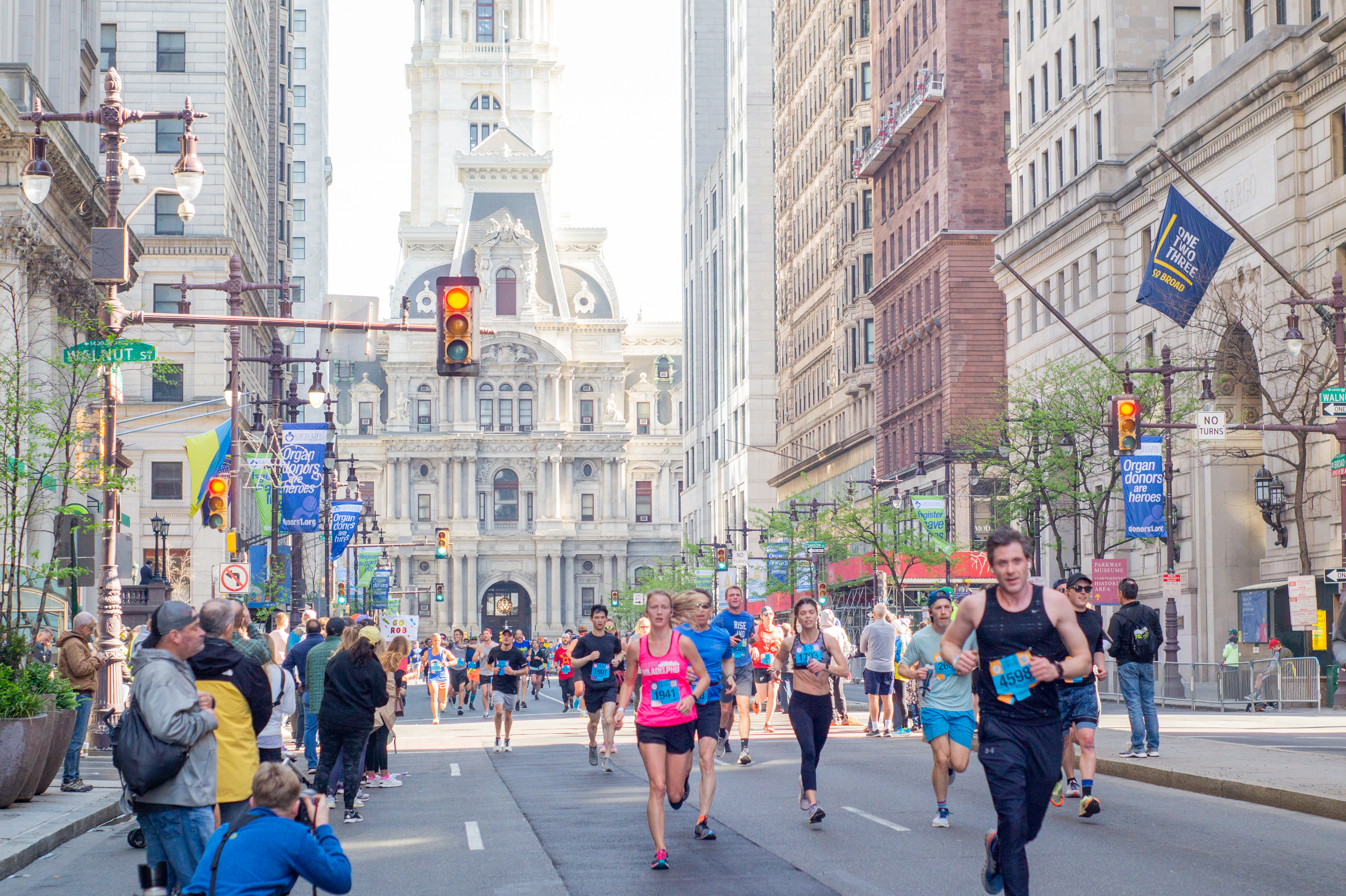
- Runners near Philadelphia City Hall for the Broad Street Run in 2022.
- Date: First Sunday in May
- Location: Philadelphia, Pennsylvania, U.S.
- Event type: Road
- Distance: 10 miles (16 km)
- Primary sponsor: Independence Blue Cross
- Beneficiary: American Cancer Society; American Association for Cancer Research; Fairmount Park Conservancy; Students Run Philly Style; Back On My Feet
- Established: 1980
- Course records: Male: Josh Izewski USA, 45:08, 2026; Female: Cynthia Limo KEN, 50:54, 2023; Non-binary: Winter Parts USA, 52:04, 2026
- Website: www.broadstreetrun.com

The Independence Blue Cross Broad Street Run is an annual 10-mile road race in Philadelphia. Launched in 1980, it is held on the first Sunday in May and is the largest of its kind in the United States (40,689 runners in 2012).

== Course ==
The race starts the athletic fields at Central High School, in the Logan neighborhood. The course stretches south along Broad Street. Runners pass Temple University, Roman Catholic High School for Boys, Philadelphia City Hall, Pennsylvania Academy of the Fine Arts and the Kimmel Center. The race finishes at the Navy Yard in South Philadelphia. Due in part to its nearly flat, slightly downhill route, it has become a favorite in the running community for those working to establish personal best times. All finishers receive a medal.

== History ==
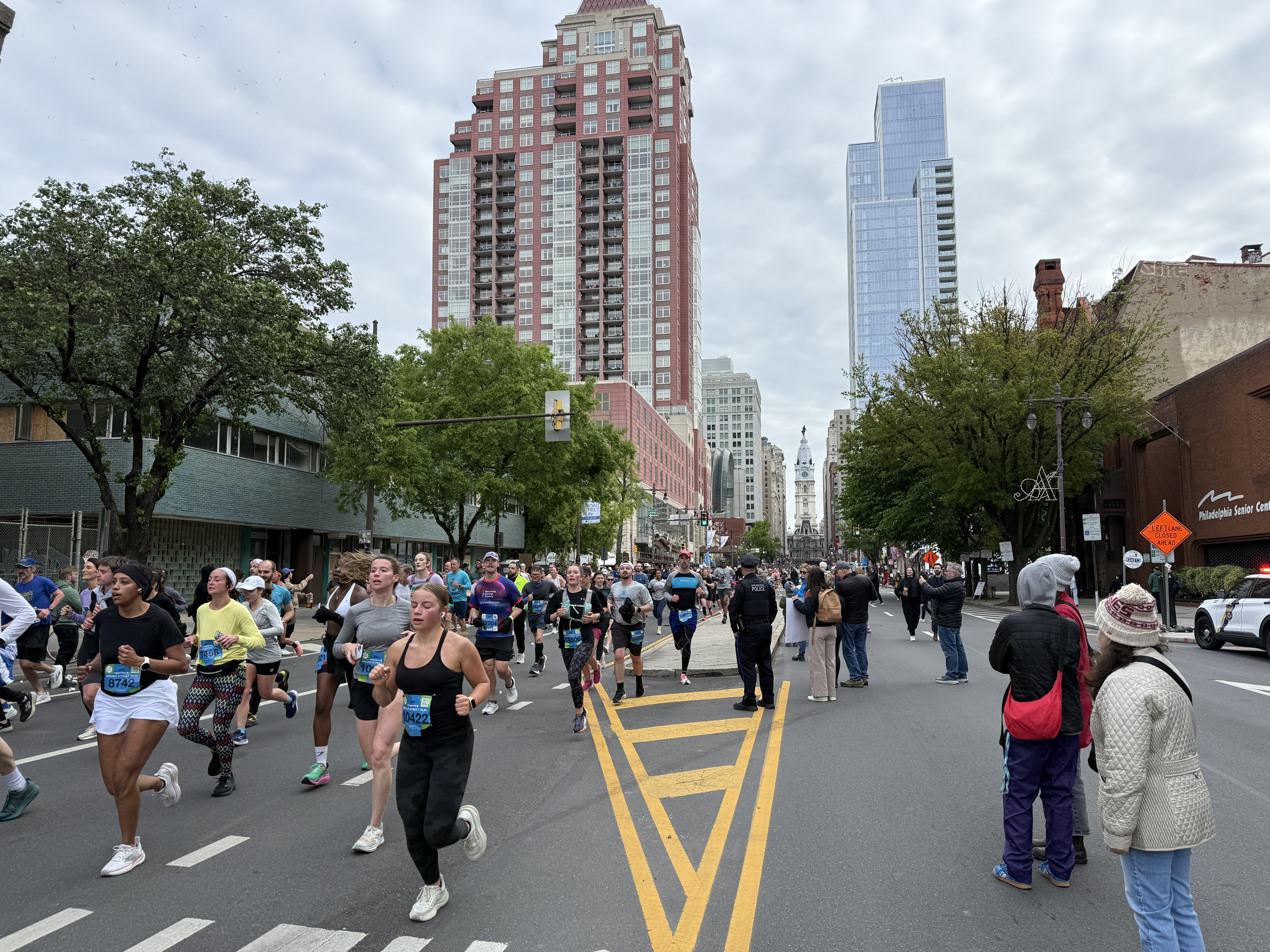
2026 Broad Street Run

The race was first run in 1980 with 1454 men and 122 women finishing. During the first two years, participants ran straight through the courtyard of City Hall; all races since have had runners diverted around the building.

Until 1989, the race ended with a lap around the field at JFK Stadium in South Philadelphia. After the stadium was condemned and demolished, the finish moved to FDR Park (on the other side of Broad Street), and then to the Navy Yard, about a quarter mile beyond the front gates.

Participation rose steadily through the 1990s and exploded by the mid-2000s. Since 2013, registration of single runners has been handled by lottery, with about 40,000 entrants, and roughly 35,000 runners finishing the race, the majority of them women.

Due to the COVID-19 pandemic, the 2020 race was postponed until Sunday, October 10, 2021, marking the first time that the race did not occur on the first Sunday of May. In 2023, the race was run on April 30, due to a scheduling conflict with a morning Philadelphia Phillies game on May 7, 2023.

== Course records ==
- Open Male: Josh Izewski, 45:08, 2026
- Open Female: Cynthia Limo, 50:54, 2023
- Master Male: Andrey Kuznetsov, 50:13, 2002
- Master Female: Sandra Mewett, 57:56, 1992
- Open Wheelchair Male: Tony Nogueira, 32:05, 2007
- Open Wheelchair Female: Jessica Galli, 35:59, 2001
- Master Wheelchair Male: Tony Nogueira, 33:52, 2008
- Master Wheelchair Female: Jacqui Kapinowski, 49:19, 2008

== Past winners ==
Key: Course record

Edition	Year	Men's winner	Time (h:m:s)	Women's winner	Time (h:m:s)
1st	1980	Mike Bradley (USA)	52:45	Jan Yerkes (USA)	1:03:45
2nd	1981	Jack Kruse (USA)	50:34	Sheila Dalo (USA)	1:03:25
3rd	1982	Jack Kruse (USA)	49:01	Pat Shiffert (USA)	57:48
4th	1983	Jack Kruse (USA)	49:46	Roberta Anthes (USA)	1:00:33
5th	1984	Kevin McGarry (USA)	48:23	Lena Holman (USA)	59:58
6th	1985	Jack Kruse (USA)	50:53	Renie Shields (USA)	59:02
7th	1986	Jim Van Blunk (USA)	49:05	Renie Shields (USA)	57:27
8th	1987	Jim Van Blunk (USA)	49:22	Renie Shields (USA)	57:51
9th	1988	Rich Byrne/Bob Schwelm (USA)	48:31	Shelly Steely (USA)	54:11
10th	1989	Briane Ferrari (USA)	49:10	Jane DiMarco (USA)	57:56
11th	1990	Jim Norris (USA)	47:53	Jan Yerkes (USA)	1:03:45
12th	1991	Brent Barnhill (USA)	47:55	Jillian Beschloss (USA)	56:22
13th	1992	Simon Peter (TAN)	47:43	Carol Haux (USA)	57:37
14th	1993	Khalid Kairouani (MAR)	47:13	Elaine Van Blunk (USA)	53:15
15th	1994	Eric Lorenz (USA)	49:21	Lori Roch (USA)	57:14
16th	1995	Joseph Kamau (KEN)	47:26	Gordon Bakoulis (USA)	55:18
17th	1996	Joel Onwonga (KEN)	47:27	Lisa Vail (USA)	55:38
18th	1997	John Mwai (KEN)	47:42	Elaine Van Blunk (USA)	54:45
19th	1998	John Mwai (KEN)	48:44	Teresa Wanjiku (KEN)	57:13
20th	1999	Elijah Kitur (KEN)	47:41	Catherine Ndereba (KEN)	53:07
21st	2000	Ben Kimondiu (KEN)	49:52	Anastasia Ndereba (KEN)	57:10
22nd	2001	Ronald Mogaka (KEN)	46:48	Misti Demko (USA)	55:14
23rd	2002	Simon Wangai (KEN)	45:16	Cassie Byrne (USA)	55:25
24th	2003	Simon Wangai (KEN)	45:19	Kate Fonshell (USA)	56:41
25th	2004	Julius Kibet (KEN)	48:07	Maria Buseinei (KEN)	57:32
26th	2005	John Itati (KEN)	47:59	Marina Ivanova (RUS)	55:37
27th	2006	Nathan Kosgei (KEN)	48:18	Olga Romanova (RUS)	53:21
28th	2007	Patrick Cheruiyot (KEN)	45:14	Naomi Wangui (KEN)	53:43
29th	2008	Philip Koech (KEN)	46:23	Jane Murage (KEN)	54:16
30th	2009	Linus Maiyo (KEN)	47:19	Jane Murage (KEN)	53:29
31st	2010	Alene Reta (ETH)	48:10	Bizunesh Deba (ETH)	55:13
32nd	2011	Ketema Nigusse (ETH)	46:29	Malika Mejdoub (MAR)	55:40
33rd	2012	Henry Kiplagat Rutto (KEN)	47:06	Esther Erb (USA)	55:28
34th	2013	Ayele Feisha (KEN)	47:03	Askale Merachi (ETH)	53:46
35th	2014	Mourad Marofit (MAR)	47:06	Bertukan Germame (ETH)	55:25
36th	2015	Haile Mengesha (ETH)	47:54	Tigist Jabore (ETH)	53:34
37th	2016	Abebe Mekuria (ETH)	48:43	Crystal Burnick (USA)	57:07
38th	2017	Dominic Korir (KEN)	47:38	Askale Merachi (ETH)	53:49
39th	2018	Daniel Kemoi (KEN)	45:43	Sophy Jepchirchir (USA)	55:43
40th	2019	Daniel Kemoi (KEN)	47:20	Susan Jerotich (KEN)	54:47
41st	2021	Dennis Kipkosgei (KEN)	46:13	Allie Kieffer (USA)	52:56
42nd	2022	Robert Gaito (KEN)	45:42	Sarah Naibei (KEN)	52:03
43rd	2023	Raymond Magut (KEN)	45:14	Cynthia Limo (KEN)	50:55
44th	2024	Kevin McDonnell (USA)	47:33	Amber Zimmerman (USA)	52:51
45th	2025	Josh Izewski (USA)	46:14	Amber Zimmerman (USA)	54:02
46th	2026	Josh Izewski (USA)	45:08	Tessa Barrett (USA)	52:24

Winners by Country

Number	Country	Last Time
43	United States	2026
33	Kenya	2023
9	Ethiopia	2017
3	Morocco	2014
2	Russia	2006
1	Tanzania	1992

== Finisher (Richard Lagocki Memorial Award) ==
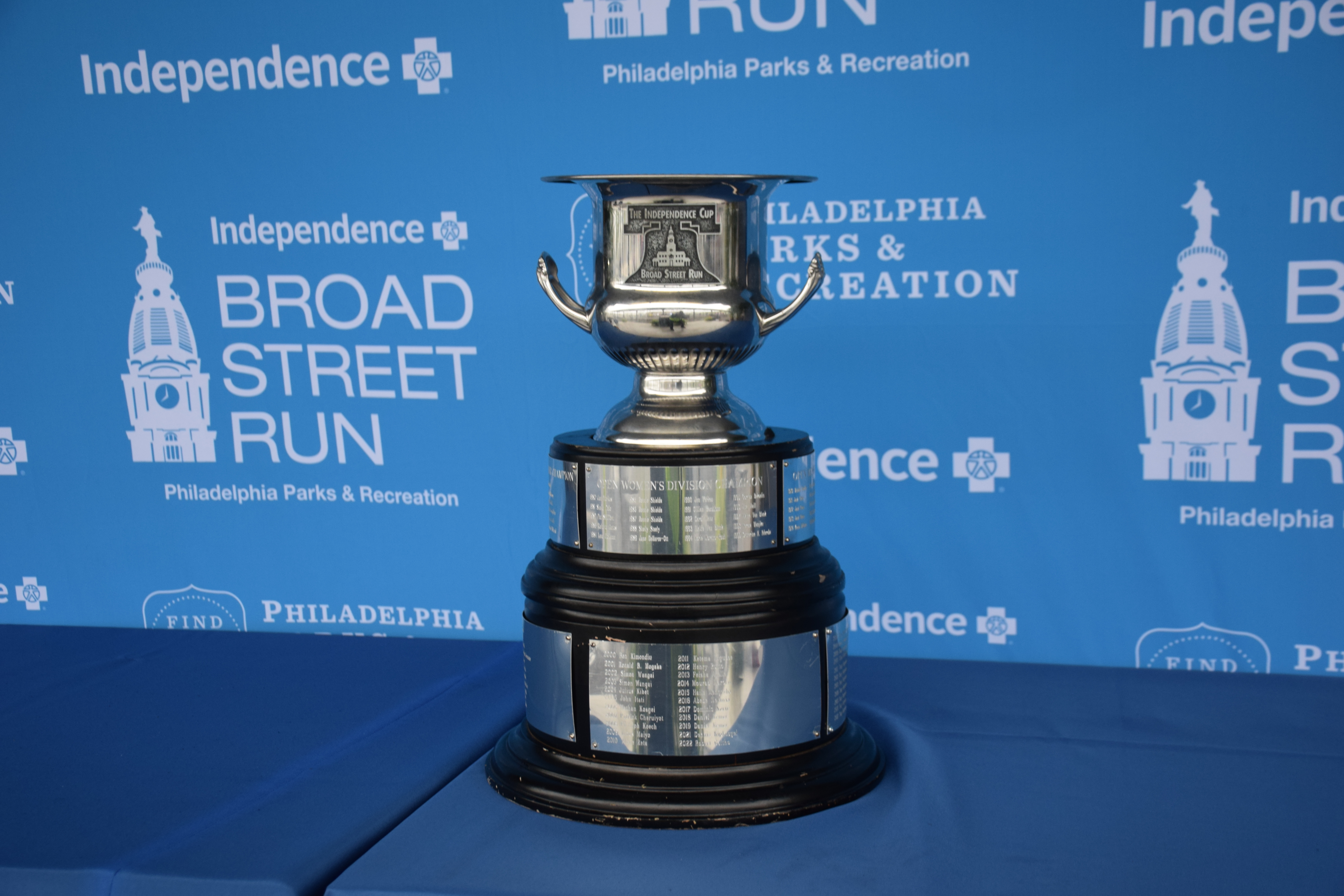
The Independence Cup, with previous winners' names engraved.

Edition	Year	Men's winner	Time (h:m:s)	Women's winner	Time (h:m:s)
5th	1984	(USA)		Lena Holman (USA)	59:58
7th	1986	(USA)		Renie Shields (USA)	57:27
8th	1987	(USA)		Renie Shields (USA)	57:51
21st	2000	Rick McGarry (USA)		Andrea Niggemeier (USA)	
22nd	2001	Rick McGarry (USA)		Andrea Niggemeier (USA)	
23rd	2002	Bob Schwelm (USA)		Abby Dean (USA)	
24th	2003	Matt DiPretore (USA)		Abby Dean (USA)	
25th	2004	Matt Byrne (USA)		Andrea Niggemeier (USA)	
26th	2005	Tom Haxton (USA)		Veena Reddy (USA)	
27th	2006	Tom Haxton (USA)		Emily Kroshus (USA)	
28th	2007	Macharia Yuot (USA)		Renee Gunning (USA)	
29th	2008	Tom Haxton (USA)		Abby Dean (USA)	
30th	2009	Tom Haxton (USA)		Sheila Klick (USA)	
31st	2010	Gregory Bielecki (USA)		Emily McGregor (USA)	
32nd	2011	Gregory Bielecki (USA)		Claire Hewitt (USA)	
33rd	2012	Gregory Bielecki (USA)		Abby Dean (USA)	1:02:30
34th	2013	Paul Matuszak (USA)	51:11	Lauren Kelly (USA)	59:23
35th	2014	Geraint Davies (USA)	51:06	Catherine Campbell (USA)	1:01:46
36th	2015	Stephen Schelander (USA)	50:27	Claire Hewitt (USA)	58:33
37th	2016	Justin Garrard (USA)	50:07	Jessica Fragola (USA)	58:12
38th	2017	Patrick Richie (USA)	49:44	Margaret Vido (USA)	56:56
39th	2018	Duriel Hardy (USA)	49:31	Margaret Vido (USA)	57:01
40th	2019	Paul Matuszak (USA)	49:21	Samantha Roecker (USA)	55:38
41st	2021	Alfredo Santana (USA)	49:39	Anne Marie Everhart (USA)	1:00:38
42nd	2022	Alfredo Santana (USA)	48:49	Amber Zimmerman (USA)	52:40
43rd	2023	Alfredo Santana (USA)	48:48	Amber Zimmerman (USA)	52:16
44th	2024	Joe Maguire (USA)	49:42	Amber Zimmerman (USA)	52:39
45th	2025	Billy Perez (USA)	51:30	Amber Zimmerman (USA)	54:02

== Deaths ==
- 1998 - Richard Lagocki, 45, Philadelphia, Pennsylvania
- 2007 - Robert A. Massaroni, 29, Holland, Pennsylvania, was a 7th grade Social Studies teacher at Shafer Middle School in Bensalem, Pennsylvania.
- 2019 - Brian Smart, 25, Hatboro, Pennsylvania, was an athletic trainer at Upper Darby High School.

== See also ==
- 10-mile run – Distance running event
- Broad Street (Philadelphia) – Thoroughfare in Pennsylvania
- Philadelphia Distance Run – Running event
- Philadelphia Marathon – Annual marathon sporting event held in Philadelphia
