= Army Ten-Miler =

Second largest US ten-mile race

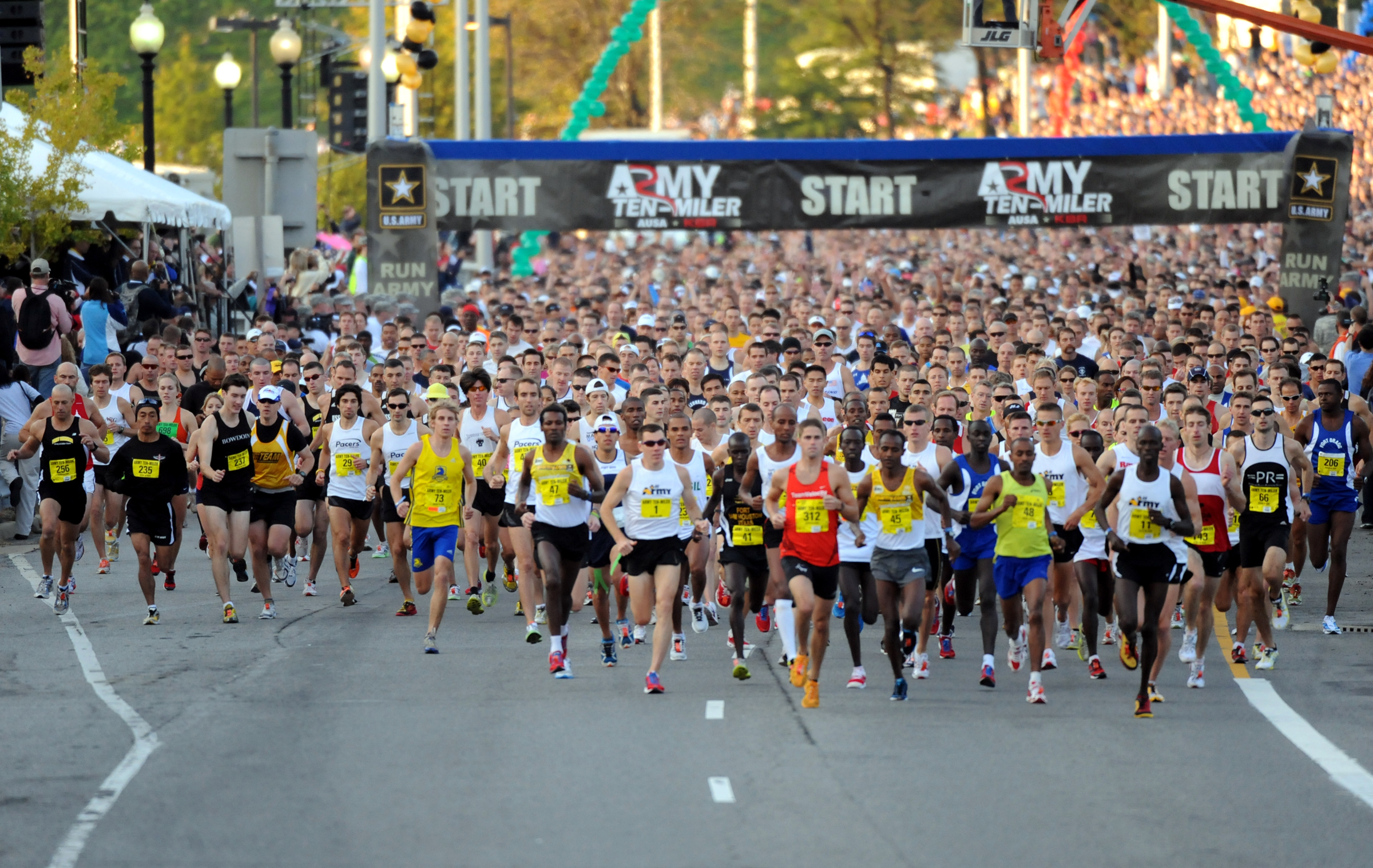
- The 2010 Army Ten Miler Start, October 24, 2010
- Date: October
- Location: Washington, D.C., Arlington County, Virginia, U.S.
- Event type: Road
- Distance: 10 miles (16 km)
- Established: 1985
- Website: www.armytenmiler.com/

The Army Ten-Miler is the second largest (after the Philadelphia Broad Street Run) ten-mile race in the United States. It is held every October in Arlington, Virginia and Washington, D.C., sponsored by the U.S. Army Military District of Washington.

The annual race weekend events also include a youth run, a youth activity fair, and a pre-race pasta dinner. The race draws a large number of civilian and military running teams. The most recent race was held on Sunday, October 11, 2026.

== History ==
Start of the Army Ten-Miler

The race started in 1985 by fitness officials connected with the Army Headquarters staff in the Pentagon. In the early years, it was led by staff assigned to the Pentagon with the logistic support of the Military District of Washington. Subsequently, the program was reassigned to the Military District, where it is headed by a year-round, full-time professional staff. The race course is USA Track and Field certified and is mostly flat, fast and picturesque.

== Notable field sizes ==
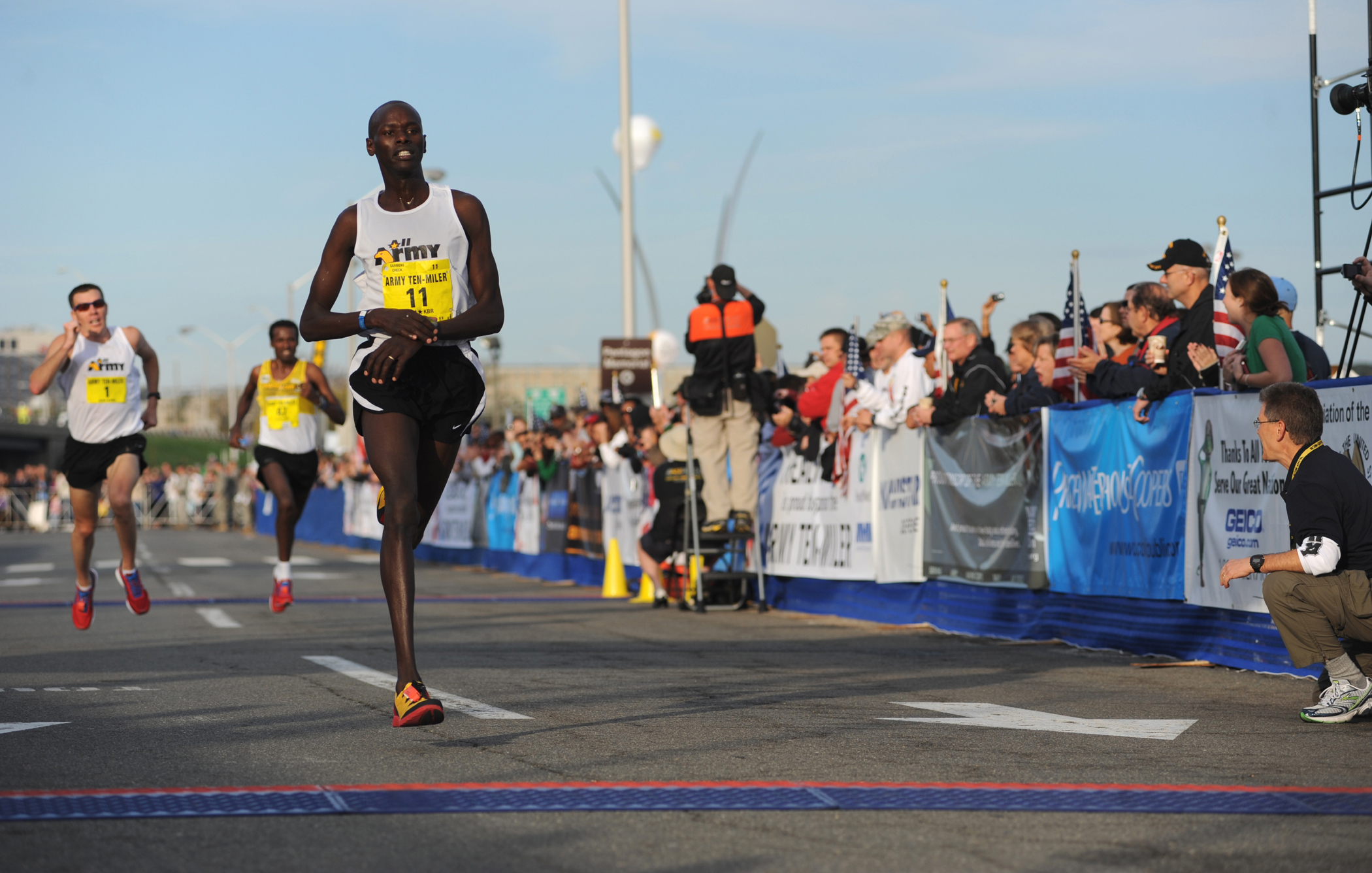
Robert Cheseret running at the 2010 race

The 2007 race was held on Sunday, October 7, 2007 with 26,000 runners entered, and a record 17,000 finishing the 10 mile route. That record lasted only one year until October 6, 2008, when there were a total of 18,789 finishers. The 2009 race was held on Sunday, October 4, 2009. There were course records set for both the men and women's race. Alene Reta, from Ethiopia, captured the men's race in 46:59 and Samia Akbar, from Herndon, Virginia, won the women's race in 55:25. 21,256 runners finished the race, making it the largest ten mile run in the United States. On the same day, nine-hundred runners from fifteen nations participated in a "shadow" run held on Kandahar Airfield, Afghanistan.

The 2010 race set Army Ten Miler registration records, with 30,000 runner slots being sold in only 35 hours. 21,636 runners finished the race, with Alene Reta, from Ethiopia, defending the men's title in 47:10 and Aziza Abate, from Ellicott City, Maryland, winning the women's race in 55:54. During race week, deployed servicemembers and civilians participated in "shadow" runs at six bases in Afghanistan, five bases in Iraq, and one camp in Djibouti, Africa.

By 2019, the race had grown to 25,000 runners.

=== Champions ===
Key: Course record

History of Army 10 Miler
Year	Runners	Male	Female	Master Male	Master Female
1995	7,110	Ronnie Harris, 48:59	Susan Molloy, 56:20	Chuck Moeser, 53:29	Patricia Donohue, 1:06:20
1996	7,579	Michael Berstein, 47:59	Chris Udovich, 58:35	David Wannewurf, 52:24	Linda Wack, 1:03:16
1997	9,404	Dan Browne, 47:44	Chris Udovich, 56:58	Tom Borschel, 52:44	Cathy Ventura-Merkel, 1:03:33
1998	11,472	Dan Browne, 48:52	Alisa Harvey, 58:56	Chuck Moeser, 53:14	Patti Shull, 1:00:10
1999	11,453	Chris Graff, 48:21	Alisa Harvey, 57:47	Sammy Ngatia, 50:46	Patti Shull, 1:03:11
2000	11,935	Sammy Ngatia, 48:50	Naoko Ishibe, 56:40	Sammy Ngatia, 48:50	Patricia Clifford, 1:05:17
2002	11,904	Ryan Kirkpatrick, 48:35	Casey Smith, 58:21	Sammy Ngatia, 51:17	Martha Merz, 59:49
2003	13,198	John Henwood, 48:49	Alisa Harvey, 59:29	John Colpeck, 53:14	Martha Merz, 1:00:36
2004	13,071	Dan Browne 47:32	Casey Smith 57:32	Sammy Ngatia, 52:47	Martha Merz, 1:00:57
2006	15,589	Jared Nyamboki, 48:24	Alisa Harvey, 59:00	Marty Muchow, 53:25	Alisa Harvey, 59:00
2007	17,641	Jose Ferreira, 49:21	Firaya Zhdanova, 58:31	Mike Scannell, 54:31	Firaya Zhdanova, 58:31
2008	18,789	Reginaldo Campos Jr., 48:59	Veena Reddy, 58:08	Mike Scannell, 53:01	Alisa Harvey, 1:00:57
2009	21,256	Alene Reta, 46:59	Samia Akbar, 55:25	Sergey Kaledin, 52:34	Elena Kaledina, 1:00:35
2010	21,636	Alene Reta, 47:10	Aziza Abate, 55:54	Sergey Kaledin, 52:50	Peggy Yetman, 58:51
2018	24,808	Frankline Tonui, 50:23	Susan Tanui, 56:33	Jason Tripp, 57:19	Barb Fallon Wallace, 1:02:31
2019	25,194	Lawi Lalang,48.38	Elvin Kibet, 54:05	Martin Wennblom, 52:25	Perry Shoemaker, 57:43
2022	12,087	Luke Peterson, 49:59	Jenny Simpson, 54:15	Michael Moore, 54:12	Adrienne Glasheen, 1:01:45
2023	17,585	Michael Jordan, 49:23	Elvin Kibet, 54:51	Augustus Maiyo, 49:56	Adrienne Glasheen, 1:05:47
2024	19,619	Sam Chelanga, 48:40	Elizabeth Sullivan, 56:58	Elkanah Kibet, 48:54	Julia Siegel Breton, 1:01:49
2025	27,592	Sam Chelanga, 48:44	Michelle Vaccaro, 56:45	Elkanah Kibet, 49:01	Julia Siegel Breton, 1:03:12
2026	27,543	Edward Buck, 48:40	Charlotte Richman, 53:49	Sam Chelanga, 48:44	Shauneen Werlinger, 58:07
