= Karin Broberg =

Swedish researcher

- Born: January 6, 1973; Uppsala
- Education: Lund University
- Scientific career
- Workplaces: Lund University and Karolinska Institute
- Website: ki.se/en/people/karbro

Karin Broberg (born 6 January 1973) is a Swedish geneticist and toxicologist and professor at Karolinska Institutet and Lund University, Sweden, known for her work on human adaptation to challenging environments.

== Education and career ==
Broberg became M.Sc. in Biology from Lund University in 1996 and MD in Experimental Clinical Genetics, Lund University in 2001. In 2015, she became Professor of Environmental Medicine with a special emphasis on genetics and epigenetics at Karolinska Institute, Stockholm, and since 2018 also holds a professorship in Occupational and Environmental Medicine at Lund University.

== Scientific work ==
Based on knowledge gained from expeditions to remote Andean plains with high arsenic in drinking waters, Broberg observed that indigenous populations of Indians inhabiting these areas since thousands of years are naturally resistant to arsenic., which is a highly toxic chemical. Arsenic tolerance was in resistant individuals found to be the result of allelic variation in the arsenic-3-methyl transferase (AS3MT) gene, the gene product of which detoxifies arsenic. This was the first report on human genetic adaptation to a toxic environment and added to the list of very few examples of evolution of humans in historic time (e.g. lactose tolerance).

Her subsequent work has provided phylogenetic evidence that the AS3MT gene moved by horizontal gene transfer from bacteria to animals during their early evolution, and independently on several occasions to other eukaryotic phylae as well. Horizontal gene transfer is distinct from vertical gene transfer from progeny to progeny, as such transfer of single genes as a means of obtaining new stably inherited trait has only rarely been reported in animals
