= Marilú Salazar =

Peruvian long-distance runner

Personal information
- Full name: Marilú Salazar Musayon
- Nationality: Peruvian
- Born: 27 October 1963 (age 62)
- Height: 1.63 m (5 ft 4 in)
- Weight: 50 kg (110 lb)

Sport
- Sport: Long-distance running
- Event: Marathon

Marilú Salazar Musayon (born 27 October 1963) is a Peruvian long-distance runner. She competed in the women's marathon at the 1996 Summer Olympics.
