= Lisa Harvey =

Canadian athlete (born 1970)

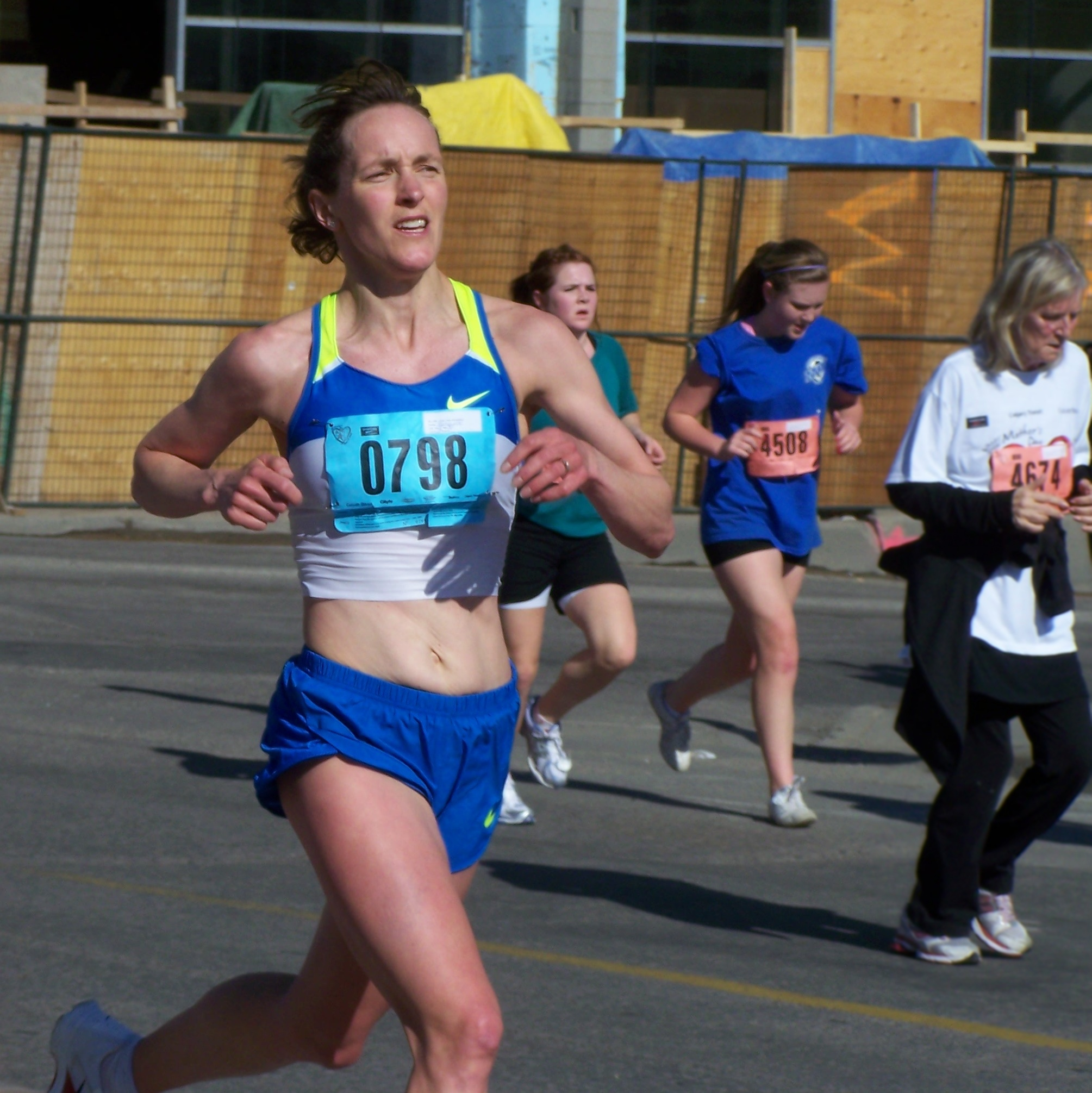
- Harvey at 2009 Calgary Mother's Day Run & Walk

Personal information
- Nationality: Canadian
- Born: February 7, 1970 (age 56) Vancouver, British Columbia
- Height: 173 cm (5 ft 8 in)

Sport
- Sport: Running
- Event: 10K
- Club: Calgary Spartans
Medal record
Representing Canada
Pan American Games
Silver medal – second place	1991 Havana	10,000m

Louise "Lisa" Harvey (born February 7, 1970) is a Canadian athlete who competed for Canada in the 10,000m (10k) competition of the 1992 Summer Olympics in Barcelona, Spain.

== Personal life ==
Harvey was born in Vancouver, British Columbia. She is married to Paul McCloy, a fellow 10k runner. She and her husband live in Calgary and have two children.
