= 1990 London Marathon =

10th London Marathon

10th London Marathon
- Venue: London, United Kingdom
- Date: 22 April 1990

Champions
- Men: Allister Hutton (2:10:10)
- Women: Wanda Panfil (2:26:31)

The 1990 London Marathon was the 10th running of the annual marathon race in London, United Kingdom, which took place on Sunday, 22 April. The elite men's race was won by home athlete Allister Hutton in a time of 2:10:10 hours and the women's race was won by Poland's Wanda Panfil in 2:26:31.

In the wheelchair races, Sweden's Håkan Ericsson (1:57:12) and Denmark's Connie Hansen (2:10:25) set course records in the men's and women's divisions, respectively. This was the first time that the winning time in the women's wheelchair race surpassed that of the women's able-bodied race.

Around 73,000 people applied to enter the race, of which 34,882 had their applications accepted and around 26,500 started the race. A total of 25,013 runners finished the race.

== Results ==
=== Men ===
Position	Athlete	Nationality	Time
1st place, gold medalist(s)	Allister Hutton	United Kingdom	2:10:10
2nd place, silver medalist(s)	Salvatore Bettiol	Italy	2:10:40
3rd place, bronze medalist(s)	Juan Francisco Romera	Spain	2:10:48
4	José Esteban Montiel	Spain	2:11:04
5	Michael O'Reilly	United Kingdom	2:11:05
6	Yakov Tolstikov	Soviet Union	2:11:07
7	Ed Eyestone	United States	2:12:00
8	Rainer Wachenbrunner	East Germany	2:12:02
9	Tomoyuki Taniguchi	Japan	2:12:22
10	Don Janicki	United States	2:12:25
11	Honorato Hernández	Spain	2:12:47
12	Paul Pilkington	United States	2:12:52
13	Walter Bassi	Italy	2:13:08
14	Pascal Zilliox	France	2:13:10
15	Joaquim Pinheiro	Portugal	2:13:17
16	Andy Ronan	Ireland	2:13:30
17	Diego García	Spain	2:13:48
18	Dereje Nedi	Ethiopia	2:13:52
19	Viktor Mosgovoy	Soviet Union	2:14:00
20	Nikolay Tabak	Soviet Union	2:14:20
21	Toshinobu Sato	Japan	2:14:27
22	Werner Grommisch	West Germany	2:14:31
23	Peter Dall	Denmark	2:14:37
24	Rustam Shagiev	Soviet Union	2:14:37
25	Andrzej Witczak	Poland	2:14:41
—	Belayneh Dinsamo	Ethiopia	DNF
—	Kevin Forster	United Kingdom	DNF
—	Hugh Jones	United Kingdom	DNF
—	Mike Gratton	United Kingdom	DNF

=== Women ===
Position	Athlete	Nationality	Time
1st place, gold medalist(s)	Wanda Panfil	Poland	2:26:31
2nd place, silver medalist(s)	Francie Larrieu Smith	United States	2:28:01
3rd place, bronze medalist(s)	Lisa Rainsberger	United States	2:28:15
4	Zhao Youfeng	China	2:29:35
5	Yekaterina Khramenkova	Soviet Union	2:29:45
6	Xie Lihua	China	2:30:18
7	Dorthe Rasmussen	Denmark	2:30:34
8	Irina Bogacheva	Soviet Union	2:30:38
9	Françoise Bonnet	France	2:31:20
10	Antonella Bizioli	Italy	2:31:34
11	Tatyana Zuyeva	Soviet Union	2:31:47
12	Sylviane Levesque	France	2:31:49
13	Lyubov Klochko	Soviet Union	2:32:08
14	Maria Rebelo	France	2:32:36
15	Nicola McCracken	United Kingdom	2:33:07
16	Li Yemei	China	2:33:39
17	Annette Fincke	East Germany	2:33:44
18	Sally Eastall	United Kingdom	2:34:31
19	Akemi Masuda	Japan	2:34:42
20	Sissel Grottenberg	Norway	2:34:57
21	Valentina Yegorova	Soviet Union	2:35:25
22	Martine Van De Gehuchte	Belgium	2:35:27
23	Sheila Catford	United Kingdom	2:36:42
24	Sally Ellis	United Kingdom	2:36:52
25	Wendy Breed	New Zealand	2:37:02
—	Aurora Cunha	Portugal	DNF
—	Susan Wightman	United Kingdom	DNF

=== Wheelchair men ===
Position	Athlete	Nationality	Time
1st place, gold medalist(s)	Håkan Ericsson	Sweden	1:57:12
2nd place, silver medalist(s)	Wolfgang Peterson	Germany	1:57:13
3rd place, bronze medalist(s)	Jean-Francois Poitevin	France	1:58:24
4	Farid Amarouche	France	1:58:35
5	Lex de Turck	Netherlands	2:03:21
6	Chris Hallam	United Kingdom	2:10:05
7	Ian Thompson	United Kingdom	2:15:58
8	David Todd	United Kingdom	2:17:07
9	Ivan Newman	United Kingdom	2:18:03
10	Jens Anderson	Denmark	2:22:02

=== Wheelchair women ===
Position	Athlete	Nationality	Time
1st place, gold medalist(s)	Connie Hansen	Denmark	2:10:25
2nd place, silver medalist(s)	Ingrid Lauridsen	Denmark	2:26:15
3rd place, bronze medalist(s)	Rose Hill	United Kingdom	2:49:46
4	Tanni Grey	United Kingdom	2:49:54
