= 1991 World Marathon Cup =

World Marathon Cup in London

The 1991 World Marathon Cup was the fourth edition of the World Marathon Cup of athletics and were held in London, United Kingdom. The competition was held jointly with the annual London Marathon on 21 April.

== Results ==
Team men
#	Nations	Time
1	Great Britain; David Long; Stephen Brace; David Buzza	6:34:59
2	Portugal; Manuel Matias; Joaquim Pinheiro; Antonio Godinho	6:35:55
3	Poland; Jan Huruk; Sławomir Gurny; Wiesław Perszke	6:36:12

Team women
#	Nations	Time
1	Soviet Union; Valentina Yegorova; Ramilya Burangulova; Tatyana Zuyeva	7:30:21
2	Italy; Anna Villani; Antonella Bizioli; Laura Fogli	7:36:37
3	France; Maria Rebelo; Françoise Bonnet; Marie-Helene Ohier	7:38:51

=== Individual men ===
Rank	Athlete	Country	Time (h:m:s)
1	Yakov Tolstikov	Soviet Union (URS)	2:09:17
2	Manuel Matias	Portugal (POR)	2:10:21
3	Jan Huruk	Poland (POL)	2:10:21
4	David Long	Great Britain (GBR)	2:10:30
5	Joaquim Pinheiro	Portugal (POR)	2:10:38
6	Alfredo Shahanga	Tanzania (TAN)	2:11:20
7	Stephen Brace	Great Britain (GBR)	2:11:45
8	Peter Maher	Canada (CAN)	2:11:46
9	Jean-Luc Assemat	France (FRA)	2:11:49
10	Salvatore Bettiol	Italy (ITA)	2:11:53
11	Konrad Dobler	Germany (GER)	2:11:57
12	José Esteban Montiel	Spain (ESP)	2:11:59
13	Tekeye Gebreselasie	Ethiopia (ETH)	2:12:05
14	Alessio Faustini	Italy (ITA)	2:12:12
15	Marco Gozzano	Italy (ITA)	2:12:26
16	David Buzza	Great Britain (GBR)	2:12:37
17	Isidro Rico	Mexico (MEX)	2:12:38
18	Sławomir Gurny	Poland (POL)	2:12:39
19	Marcelino Crisanto	Mexico (MEX)	2:12:42
20	Hugh Jones	Great Britain (GBR)	2:12:46
21	Carlos Ayala	Mexico (MEX)	2:12:51
22	Luis Soares	France (FRA)	2:12:53
23	Diego Garcia	Spain (ESP)	2:12:54
24	Pascal Zilliox	France (FRA)	2:12:59
25	Belayneh Tadesse	Ethiopia (ETH)	2:13:09
26	Wiesław Perszke	Poland (POL)	2:13:12
27	Takeshi So	Japan (JPN)	2:13:15
28	Peter Daenens	Belgium (BEL)	2:13:16
29	Vicente Anton	Spain (ESP)	2:13:38
30	Sam Carey	Great Britain (GBR)	2:13:54
31	Jose Carlos da Silva	Brazil (BRA)	2:14:11
32	Allister Hutton	Great Britain (GBR)	2:14:13
33	Mohamed Salmi	Morocco (MAR)	2:14:20
34	Giuseppe Miccoli	Italy (ITA)	2:14:30
35	Kennedy Manyisa	Kenya (KEN)	2:14:31
36	Walter Durbano	Italy (ITA)	2:14:39
37	John Griffin	Ireland (IRL)	2:14:42
38	Rodrigo Gavela	Spain (ESP)	2:14:48
39	Roy Dooney	Ireland (IRL)	2:14:50
40	Peter DeVocht	Belgium (BEL)	2:14:54
41	Juan-Antonio Crespo	Spain (ESP)	2:14:54
42	Steve Taylor	United States (USA)	2:14:56
43	Antonio Godinho	Portugal (POR)	2:14:56
44	Anthony Milovsorov	Great Britain (GBR)	2:14:57
45	Jean-Jacques Padel	France (FRA)	2:14:59
46	Pawel Tarasiuk	Poland (POL)	2:14:59
47	Gumercindo Olmedo	Mexico (MEX)	2:15:00
48	Ignacio-Alberto Cuba	Cuba (CUB)	2:15:00
49	Zerihun Gizaw	Ethiopia (ETH)	2:15:08
50	Peter Dall	Denmark (DEN)	2:15:11
51	Nikolay Tabak	Soviet Union (URS)	2:15:20
52	Negash Dube	Ethiopia (ETH)	2:15:22
53	Rustam Shagiev	Soviet Union (URS)	2:15:33
54	Mario Sousa	Portugal (POR)	2:15:39
55	Christopher Buckley	Great Britain (GBR)	2:15:48
56	Ronny Ligneel	Belgium (BEL)	2:16:05
57	Andres Espinosa	Mexico (MEX)	2:16:07
58	Allaoua Khellil	Algeria (ALG)	2:16:16
59	Taieb Tounsi	Tunisia (TUN)	2:16:24
60	Didier Bernard	France (FRA)	2:16:28
61	Kazuyoshi Kudo	Japan (JPN)	2:16:31
62	Rich McCandless	United States (USA)	2:16:36
63	Robin Nash	Great Britain (GBR)	2:16:42
64	David-Robert Clarke	Great Britain (GBR)	2:16:57
65	Gareth Spring	Great Britain (GBR)	2:16:59
66	Michel Deleze	Switzerland (SUI)	2:17:00
67	Ricardo Jose Castano	Spain (ESP)	2:17:11
68	Giacomo Tagliaferri	Italy (ITA)	2:17:11
69	José Luis Adsuara	Spain (ESP)	2:17:17
70	Takashi Kaneko	Japan (JPN)	2:17:18
71	William Bedell	Great Britain (GBR)	2:17:21
72	John Campbell	New Zealand (NZL)	2:17:22
73	Mohamed Abdi-Said	Djibouti (DJI)	2:17:25
74	Won-Tak Kim	South Korea (KOR)	2:17:27
75	Andrew Symonds	Great Britain (GBR)	2:17:27
76	Joseildo Rocha	Brazil (BRA)	2:17:27
77	Kuruppu Karunaratne	Sri Lanka (SRI)	2:17:45
78	Jean-Baptiste Protais	France (FRA)	2:17:45
79	Jeremy Watson	Great Britain (GBR)	2:17:49
80	Bruno Leger	France (FRA)	2:17:54
81	Jose Cesar deSouza	Brazil (BRA)	2:17:58
82	Mervyn Johnstone	Australia (AUS)	2:17:59
83	Werner Grommisch	Germany (GER)	2:18:01
84	Greg Newhams	Great Britain (GBR)	2:18:08
85	Heinz-Bernhardt Bürger	Germany (GER)	2:18:09
86	Henrik Jørgensen	Denmark (DEN)	2:18:15
87	Toribio Gutierrez	Argentina (ARG)	2:18:20
88	Osvaldo Faustini	Italy (ITA)	2:18:30
89	Ian Bloomfield	Great Britain (GBR)	2:18:32
90	Youssef Doukal	Djibouti (DJI)	2:18:42
91	Spyridon Andriopoulos	Greece (GRE)	2:18:42
92	Michel Brochu	Canada (CAN)	2:18:47
93	Enrique Cortinas	Spain (ESP)	2:18:48
94	Geert Muylaert	Belgium (BEL)	2:18:50
95	Russell Foley	Australia (AUS)	2:18:53
96	William Foster	Great Britain (GBR)	2:19:03
97	Ahmet Altun	Turkey (TUR)	2:19:03
98	Julius Sumawe	Tanzania (TAN)	2:19:19
99	Toshihiro Shibutani	Japan (JPN)	2:19:28
100	Peter Fonseca	Canada (CAN)	2:19:31
101	Luis Lopez	Costa Rica (CRC)	2:19:31
102	Othmar Schoop	Germany (GER)	2:19:47
103	Mikhail Tomasek	France (FRA)	2:19:52
104	Ali Hadj	Algeria (ALG)	2:19:54
105	Maurice Cowman	Ireland (IRL)	2:19:56
107	Philippe Plancke	France (FRA)	2:20:10
117	Martin Grüning	Germany (GER)	2:21:11
119?	Ronald Johnson	United States (USA)	2:21:20
126	Ravil Kashapov	Soviet Union (URS)	2:21:52
130?	Ciarán O'Flaherty	Ireland (IRL)	2:22:20
141	John Wheway	Great Britain (GBR)	2:23:46
161	Viktor Mosgovoy	Soviet Union (URS)	2:25:35
164	Tony Power	Great Britain (GBR)	2:25:37
175	Darrell General	United States (USA)	2:26:54
177?	Jozef Kazanecki	Poland (POL)	2:27:12
192?	Per-Gunnar Overland	Norway (NOR)	2:28:18
—	Gelindo Bordin	Italy (ITA)	DNF
—	Bill Reifsnyder	United States (USA)	DNF
—	Carl Thackery	Great Britain (GBR)	DNF
—	Delmir-Alves dos Santos	Brazil (BRA)	DNF
—	Suleiman Nyambui	Tanzania (TAN)	DNF

=== Individual women ===
Rank	Athlete	Country	Time (h:m:s)
1	Rosa Mota	Portugal (POR)	2:26:14
2	Francie Larrieu	United States (USA)	2:27:35
3	Valentina Yegorova	Soviet Union (URS)	2:28:18
4	Katrin Dörre	Germany (GER)	2:28:57
5	Maria Rebelo	France (FRA)	2:29:04
6	Renata Kokowska	Poland (POL)	2:30:12
7	Ramilya Burangulova	Soviet Union (URS)	2:30:41
8	Naomi Watanabe	Japan (JPN)	2:31:23
9	Tatyana Zuyeva	Soviet Union (URS)	2:31:23
10	Anna Villani	Italy (ITA)	2:31:26
11	Irina Bogacheva	Soviet Union (URS)	2:31:35
12	Antonella Bizioli	Italy (ITA)	2:32:30
13	Laura Fogli	Italy (ITA)	2:32:41
14	Mari Tanigawa	Japan (JPN)	2:33:16
15	Sissel Grottenberg	Norway (NOR)	2:33:21
16	Christel Rogiers	Belgium (BEL)	2:33:41
17	Ria Van Landeghem	Belgium (BEL)	2:33:49
18	Joy Smith	United States (USA)	2:34:20
19	Mary O'Connor	New Zealand (NZL)	2:34:31
20	Sally Ellis	Great Britain (GBR)	2:34:42
21	Veronique Marot	Great Britain (GBR)	2:34:46
22	Françoise Bonnet	France (FRA)	2:34:49
23	Izabela Zatorska	Poland (POL)	2:34:55
24	Marie-Helene Ohier	France (FRA)	2:34:59
25	Kerstin Pressler	Germany (GER)	2:35:09
26	Sally Eastall	Great Britain (GBR)	2:36:19
27	Birgit Jerschabek	Germany (GER)	2:36:38
28	Anna Rybicka	Poland (POL)	2:36:41
29	Jocelyne Villeton	France (FRA)	2:37:04
30	Dominique Rembert	France (FRA)	2:37:05
31	Lidia Camberg	Poland (POL)	2:37:13
32	Terry Adams	Switzerland (SUI)	2:37:32
33	Sylvie Laville	France (FRA)	2:37:51
34	Julie Peterson	United States (USA)	2:38:10
35	Sylviane Levesque	France (FRA)	2:38:56
36	Zina Marchant	Great Britain (GBR)	2:39:26
37	Pascaline Wangui	Kenya (KEN)	2:39:39
38	Marian Sutton	Great Britain (GBR)	2:40:03
39	Ursula Noctor	Ireland (IRL)	2:40:18
40	Martine Laurent	France (FRA)	2:40:52
41	Linda Rushmere	Great Britain (GBR)	2:41:17
42	Rosemary Ellis	Great Britain (GBR)	2:41:21
43	Anne Roden	Great Britain (GBR)	2:41:22
44	Karen Scholte	United States (USA)	2:41:54
45	Connie Kelly	Ireland (IRL)	2:42:18
46	Tatyana Polovinskaya	Soviet Union (URS)	2:42:27
47	Elisenda Pucurull	Spain (ESP)	2:42:31
48	Hiroko Tanaka	Japan (JPN)	2:42:40
49	Sandra Bentley	Great Britain (GBR)	2:42:54
50	Yekaterina Khramenkova	Soviet Union (URS)	2:43:12
51	Krystyna Chylińska	Poland (POL)	2:43:30
52	Carmen Mingorance	Spain (ESP)	2:43:42
53	Sheila Catford	Great Britain (GBR)	2:43:50
54	Patricia Griffin	Ireland (IRL)	2:43:56
55	Maryse Le Gallo	France (FRA)	2:44:31
56	Jacqueline Davis	Great Britain (GBR)	2:44:33
57	Bernadette Stankart	Ireland (IRL)	2:45:04
58	Viviene Van Buggenhout	Belgium (BEL)	2:45:34
59	Jacqueline Casey	Great Britain (GBR)	2:45:39
60	Catherina Smyth	Ireland (IRL)	2:45:49
61	Aurelia de Jesus	Mexico (MEX)	2:45:57
62	Elena Cobos	Spain (ESP)	2:45:58
63	Pauline Nolan	Ireland (IRL)	2:46:16
64	Christine Van Put	Belgium (BEL)	2:46:36
65	Carol McLatchie	United States (USA)	2:46:53
66	Maribel Durruty	Cuba (CUB)	2:47:05
67	Maria-Elena Reyna	Mexico (MEX)	2:47:16
68	Consuelo Casanovas	Spain (ESP)	2:47:27
69	Bridget Murphy	Ireland (IRL)	2:47:41
70	Elizabeth Hughes	Great Britain (GBR)	2:47:49
71	Kathryn Drake	Great Britain (GBR)	2:48:02
72	Janet Kelly	Great Britain (GBR)	2:48:03
73	Janice Moorekite	Great Britain (GBR)	2:48:27
74	Elizabeth Staig	Great Britain (GBR)	2:49:16
75	Marianne Fløymo	Norway (NOR)	2:49:29
76	Sigrid Renna	Norway (NOR)	2:49:32
77	Anette Hansen	Denmark (DEN)	2:49:33
78	Eleanor Hill	Ireland (IRL)	2:49:35
79	Suk-Song Kim	South Korea (KOR)	2:49:46
80	Zoe Lowe	Great Britain (GBR)	2:50:16
81	Vilma Sanchez	Costa Rica (CRC)	2:50:48
84	Susan Shield	Great Britain (GBR)	2:51:33
86	Susan Clarke	Great Britain (GBR)	2:52:01
89	Lidia Șimon	Romania (ROM)	2:52:48
90	Marina Prat	Spain (ESP)	2:52:49
91	Kathleen Howe	Great Britain (GBR)	2:53:29
92	Mary Ryzner	United States (USA)	2:53:57
—	Dorthe Rasmussen	Denmark (DEN)	DNF
—	Wendy Breed	New Zealand (NZL)	DNF
