= 1993 New York City Marathon =

24th Marathon in NYC, USA

24th New York City Marathon
- Venue: New York City, New York
- Date: November 14

Champions
- Men: Andrés Espinosa (2:10:04)
- Women: Uta Pippig (2:26:24)

The 1993 New York City Marathon was the 24th running of the annual marathon race in New York City, New York, which took place on Sunday, November 14. The men's elite race was won by Mexico's Andrés Espinosa in a time of 2:10:04 hours while the women's race was won by Germany's Uta Pippig in 2:26:24.

A total of 26,597 runners finished the race, 20,781 men and 5816 women.

== Results ==
=== Men ===
Position	Athlete	Nationality	Time
1st place, gold medalist(s)	Andrés Espinosa	Mexico	2:10:04
2nd place, silver medalist(s)	Bob Kempainen	United States	2:11:03
3rd place, bronze medalist(s)	Arturo Barrios	Mexico	2:12:21
4	Joaquim Pinheiro	Portugal	2:12:40
5	Keith Brantly	United States	2:12:49
6	Inocencio Miranda	Mexico	2:12:52
7	Paul Evans	United Kingdom	2:13:36
8	Sammy Lelei	Kenya	2:13:56
9	Grzegorz Gajdus	Poland	2:15:34
10	Moses Tanui	Kenya	2:15:36
11	Frank Bjørkli	Norway	2:15:40
12	Faustino Reynoso	Mexico	2:16:04
13	Peter Maher	Canada	2:16:29
14	Steve Brace	United Kingdom	2:16:43
15	Sergio Jimenez	Mexico	2:16:47
16	Steve Plasencia	United States	2:17:24
17	Carlos Tarazona	Venezuela	2:17:30
18	Lameck Aguta	Kenya	2:17:36
19	Don Janicki	United States	2:18:08
20	Jose Carlos da Silva	Brazil	2:18:21
—	Luketz Swartbooi	Namibia	DNF
—	Jean-Baptiste Protais	France	DNF
—	Paul Cummings	United States	DNF

=== Women ===
Position	Athlete	Nationality	Time
1st place, gold medalist(s)	Uta Pippig	Germany	2:26:24
2nd place, silver medalist(s)	Olga Appell	Mexico	2:28:56
3rd place, bronze medalist(s)	Nadia Prasad	New Caledonia	2:30:16
4	Márcia Narloch	Brazil	2:32:23
5	Alena Peterková	Czech Republic	2:33:43
6	Emma Scaunich	Italy	2:35:02
7	Ramilya Burangulova	Russia	2:36:13
8	Nadezhda Wijenberg	Russia	2:37:58
9	Christel Rogiers	Belgium	2:38:41
10	Lyubov Klochko	Ukraine	2:41:44
11	Firaya Sultanova-Zhdanova	Russia	2:42:24
12	Estela Castro	Colombia	2:42:31
13	Svetlana Netchaeva	Russia	2:47:31
14	Laura Fogli	Italy	2:47:45
15	Geny Mascarenho	Brazil	2:48:09
16	Ellen Gibson	United States	2:50:17
17	Martine Payet	France	2:50:56
18	Anna Adelia Rios	United States	2:51:09
19	Jean Chodnicki	United States	2:52:00
20	Marijana Vidovic	Slovenia	2:52:09
—	Kim Jones	United States	DNF
—	Anne-Marie Lauck	United States	DNF
