= Klochko =

Klochko (Ukrainian: Клочко) is a gender-neutral Ukrainian surname. Notable people with the surname include:

- Andriy Klochko (born 1981), Ukrainian politician
- Lyubov Klochko (born 1959), Ukrainian long-distance runner
