= City of Norwich Half Marathon =

Road running event in Norwich, England

- Date: April (2017 onward); November (until 2015)
- Location: Norwich
- Event type: Road
- Distance: Half marathon
- Established: 1985; 41 years ago
- Course records: 1:03:59 (men); 1:14:49 (women)
- Website: cityofnorwichhalfmarathon.com

The City of Norwich Half Marathon is an annual road running event held in Norwich, United Kingdom.

== History ==
Duke Street Running Club staged the first event in 1985. The race was originally based in the City of Norwich, but in 1992 it moved to the Royal Norfolk Showground, close to Easton, Norfolk. The event was run in November but after the 2015 edition was moved to April, resulting in the cancellation of the 2016 edition.

== Past winners ==
The event has been won four times by Adrian Mussett, and five times by Sarah Stradling.

Edition	Year	Time (h:m:s)	Men's winner	Time (h:m:s)	Women's winner
1	1985	1:05:11	Dennis Fowles	1:12:57	Sarah Rowell
2	1986	1:07:29	Mark Flint	1:23:52	Sandra Lappage
3	1987	1:06:16	Steve Brace	1:16:48	Sally Ellis
4	1988	1:07:04	Seamus Kerr	1:27:10	Helen Johnson
5	1989	1:07:26	Gregor Booth	1:18:37	Celia Duncan
6	1990	1:10:29	Jerry Watson	1:22:10	Wendy Gaisford
7	1991	1:07:25	Tony Graham	1:17:03	Sally Eastall
8	1992	1:07:21	Tommy Hughes	1:19:32	Susan Coxhall
Change of Route
9	1993	1:08:24	Gareth Deacon	1:15:25	Sally Eastall
10	1994	1:07:02	Gareth Spring	1:18:22	Teresa Dyer
11	1995	1:07:38	Nigel Powley	1:16:44	Karen Cornwell
12	1996	1:08:01	Darren Mead	1:19:52	Angela Joiner
13	1997	1:10:28	Gareth Deacon	1:19:23	Angela Joiner
14	1998	1:06:28	Adrian Mussett	1:24:26	Satomi Miwa
15	1999	1:05:56	Adrian Mussett	1:22:05	Sandra Bower
16	2000	1:11:11	Guy Amos	1:23:45	Sandra Bower
17	2001	1:05:10	Guy Amos	1:18:35	Debbie Percival
18	2002	1:06:39	Erick Kiplagat	1:15:26	Cathy Mutwa
19	2003	1:07:25	Erick Kiplagat	1:14:49	Mara Yamauchi
20	2004	1:09:20	Tesfaye Eticha	1:19:14	Birhan Dagne
21	2005	1:03:59	Neo Molema	1:16:52	Lucy Hasell
22	2006	1:07:26	Simon Tonui	1:17:18	Birhan Dagne
23	2007	1:09:09	Adrian Mussett	1:21:22	Sarah Stradling
24	2008	1:05:44	Matthew Janes	1:17:29	Olivia Walwyn
25	2009	1:08:51	Ian Kimpton	1:18:20	Sarah Stradling
26	2010	1:08:23	Ian Kimpton	1:18:55	Sarah Stradling
27	2011	1:12:44	Adrian Mussett	1:19:44	Sarah Stradling
28	2012	1:13:34	Nick Earl	1:20:13	Daisy Glover
29	2013	1:10:20	Ben Russell	1:17:25	Daisy Glover
30	2014	1:08:08	Daniel Watts	1:20:21	Sarah Stradling
31	2015	1:09:46	Adrian Mussett	1:19:17	Helen Davies
2016 edition cancelled
32	2017	1:12:32	Piers Arnold	1:27:07	Emma Risbey
33	2018	1:09:54	Ash Harrell	1:21:19	Mabel Beckett
34	2019	1:07:41	Piers Arnold	1:20:11	Mabel Beckett
2020 edition cancelled due to the COVID-19 pandemic.
35	2021	1:08:30	Norman Shreeve	1:16:31	Natasha Cockram
