= Elena Plastinina =

Ukrainian athlete

Olena Plastynina (also known as Yelena Plastynina or Yelena Plastinina, Ukrainian: Олена Пластиніна; born Nov. 5, 1963) is a Ukrainian athlete who in 1989 became the Ukrainian 10K Champion when she raced to a 33:55.06 finish in Kyiv, Ukraine.

Plastinina was the sole representative for her country in the 1995 World Marathon Cup. She also competed in the 1995 and 1997 IAAF World Half Marathon Championships.

She won several races in her career, including the 1998 Grandma's Marathon (in Minnesota along the shore of Lake Superior), the 1993 Kosice Marathon, the 1996 Istanbul Marathon, the 2000 Hartford Marathon in Connecticut, and the 2003 Philadelphia Marathon. Another of her other notable performances includes the 2000 Reading Half Marathon in the United Kingdom. In the final mile, Plastinina, then 44, dueled with Ethiopian Birhan Dagne and Lynne MacDougall to finish third in the race's closest-ever woman's finish.
