= Ana Gutiérrez =

Ana Gutiérrez can refer to:

- Ana Gutiérrez (footballer)
- Ana Gutiérrez (runner)
- Ana Gutiérrez (javelin thrower)
- Ana Sol Gutierrez, politician
