= Blaydon Race =

Footrace ending in Blaydon, England

- Date: 9 June
- Location: Newcastle upon Tyne to Blaydon, England, UK
- Event type: Road
- Distance: 5.9 miles (previously 5.4 and 5.8 miles)
- Established: 1981; 45 years ago
- Course records: Men: (United Kingdom) K Forster 25:16; Women: (United Kingdom) Jill Hunter 28:03
- Website: The Blaydon Race

The Blaydon Race is an officially measured 5.9-mile (9.5 km) athletics race from Newcastle upon Tyne to Blaydon, in England, that is steeped in local tradition. It takes place on 9 June every year and starts off with the singing of the "Blaydon Races" – with the words as the basis for the race.

== History ==
The modern race was the inspiration for Dr James Dewar of Blaydon Harriers, who organised the first 24 races starting in 1981. The first race attracted 212 entries, but by 2004 a record of 4,000 people took part with more than 600 other hopefuls rejected.

The 25th anniversary of the race was run by the Blaydon Harriers in 2005 as the "Nike Jim Dewar Blaydon Race" in memory of James Dewar, who died in June 2004 just 2 days after the running of the 24th event.

The task of organising the race was guaranteed by other Blaydon Harrier members and the event's popularity typically means that the entry limit is reached within hours of the race entry forms becoming available. The 2019 event had 4,700 registered entries for a race of 5.4 miles (8.7 km).

== Charity and sponsorships ==
Each year, the event adopts a local Charity – many thousands of pounds have been raised for them each year.

The 2014, 2015, 2023 and 2024 events were sponsored by the sports retailer Start Fitness.

The 2019 event was sponsored by the global software company Sage Group who have their global headquarters in Newcastle upon Tyne.

The 2022 event was sponsored by Costain.

== Local dialect usage ==
In keeping with the local flavour of this race, a lot of the instructions for entering, together with subsequent information mailed to competitors, are written in the local Geordie Dialect. Some translations follow:

"Divvent wurri if ya moovin withoot ya legs waakin": don't worry if you find yourself moving without trying to.

"Gan canny pet": please take care.

"Wu wivvent charge ye owt extra or tyek any cut from it": we will pass on to our charity everything you donate.

== Past winners ==
=== Lads and Lasses ===
	Lads			Lasses		
Year	Name	Club / Country	Time	Name	Club / Country	Time
1981	Mike McLeod	Elswick Harriers	26:27	H Boyes	Morpeth Harriers	34:10
1982	K Forster	Saltwell Harriers	25:16	H Boyes	Morpeth Harriers	31:39
1983	K Forster	Gateshead Harriers	25:59	M Dodsworth	Houghton Harriers	31:30
1984	K Forster	Gateshead Harriers	25:18	P McFarland	Claremont RR	32:05
1985	B Rushworth	Sunderland Harriers	27:36	Jill Hunter	Blaydon Harriers	32:10
1986	Mike McLeod	Elswick Harriers	26:35	Jill Hunter	Blaydon Harriers	31:13
1987	A Richardson	S Shields Harriers	27:59	Jill Hunter	Blaydon Harriers	29:56
1988	P Cuskin	Jarrow & Hebburn AC	25:35	Jill Hunter	Blaydon Harriers	28:03
1989	Mike McLeod	Elswick Harriers	25:24	L Harding	Houghton Harriers	29:59
1990	Mike McLeod	Elswick Harriers	26:46	Veronique Marot	Leeds City	29:51
1991	P Campbell	Sunderland Harriers	32:14	K Mitchell	Tynedale Harriers	37:24
1992	Mike McLeod	Elswick Harriers	27:59	L Marr	Tynedale Harriers	32:22
1993	Mike McLeod	Elswick Harriers	27:53	N Brown	Tynedale Harriers	32:14
1994	Mike McLeod	Elswick Harriers	29:14	K Mitchell	Tynedale Harriers	37:24
1995	B Rushworth	Sunderland Harriers	26:52	S Allen	Houghton Harriers	33:05
1996	B Rushworth	Sunderland Harriers	27:37	S Morley	Jarrow & Hebburn AC	33:00
1997	M Hudspith	Morpeth Harriers	27:24	S Griffiths	Cramlington AC	32:13
1998	Carl Thackery	Hallamshire Harriers	27:25	Birhan Dagne	Essex Ladies	31:18
1999	Julius Kimtai	Kenya	27:15	Birhan Dagne	Essex Ladies	31:04
2000	Julius Kimtai	Kenya	26:35	Birhan Dagne	Essex & Woodford	31:18
2001	Julius Kimtai	Kenya	26:51	Karen Hind	Gateshead Harriers	31:18
2002	Julius Kimtai	Kenya	26:19	Yelena Burykina	Russia	29:34
2003	Tesfaye Eticha	Switzerland	26:25	Yelena Burykina	Russia	29:18
2004	Julius Kimtai	Kenya	27:15	Miriam Wangari	Kenya	30:51
2005	Simon Tonui	Kenya	26:43	Catherine Mutwa	Birchfield	31:20
2006	Patrick Makau	Kenya	26:13	Ogla Kimaiyo	Kenya	30:01
2007	Tewodros Shiferaw	Birchfield	26:28	Catherine Mutwa	Birchfield	30:35
2008	Ayele Mergessa	Ethiopia	28:34	Roman Gessese	Ethiopia	31:59
2009	Ian Hudspith	Morpeth	27:44	Justina Heslop	Clapham	31:46
2010	Ezekiel Cherop	Kenya	27:41	Justina Heslop	Clapham	31:25
2011	Edwin Kipkorir	Kenya	28:25	Justina Heslop	Clapham	31:44
2012	Peter Lemuya	Kenya	27:35	Lauren Howart	Leigh	30:26
2013	Boniface Kiprop	Kenya	26:22	Perendis Lekepana		29:51
2014	Peter Emase	Kenya	26:34	Joanne Chelimo	Kenya	29:42
2015	Jonathan Taylor	Morpeth	26:25	Alyson Dixon	Sunderland Strollers	29:40
2016	Peter Newton	Morpeth	27:11	Alyson Dixon	Sunderland Strollers	29:48
2017	Peter Newton	Morpeth	27:50	Sonia Samuels	Sale Harriers	29:48
2018	John Beattie	Newham & Essex Beagles	26:39	Danielle Hodgkinson	Wallsend Harriers	30:47
2019	Graham Rush	Leeds City AC	25:33	Alyson Dixon	Sunderland Strollers	28:30
2022	Calum Johnson	Gateshead Harriers	29:19	Danielle Hodgkinson	Wallsend Harriers	33:38
2023	Calum Johnson	Gateshead Harriers	26:44	Camilla McKnespiey	Leeds City AC	31:06
2024	Calum Johnson	Gateshead Harriers	27:41	Sonia Samuels	Sale Harriers	31:28
2025	Calum Johnson	Gateshead Harriers	28:07	Sonia Samuels	Sale Harriers	32:07

=== Gadgies and Dames ===
Gadgie (male over 35) and Dame (female over 35).

	Gadgies			Dames		
Year	Name	Club / Country	Time	Name	Club / Country	Time
1981	J Alder	Morpeth Harriers	29:55	V Robson	Gateshead Harriers	38:53
1982	E Hudspith	Morpeth Harriers	28:30	V Robson	Gateshead Harriers	35:45
1983	J Alder	Morpeth Harriers	28:19	M Anderson	Elswick Harriers	34:41
1984	R Highnam	Tynedale	28:56	S Wilson	Houghton Harriers	33:54
1985	K McNally	Gateshead Harriers	28:56	P McFarland	Claremont RR	33:13
1986	D Littlewood	Crook & Dist	29:22	P M Farland	Claremont RR	34:21
1987	H Matthews	Elswick Harriers	28:45	E Lawson	Elswick Harriers	36:59
1988	H Matthews	Elswick Harriers	28:37	P McFarland	Claremont RR	31:59
1989	A Whitfield	Chester-le-Street	27:17	R Haggan	Claremont RR	32:40
1990	H Matthews	Elswick Harriers	28:17	M Laney	Clayton-le-Moors	34:15
1991	H Matthews	Elswick Harriers	34:01	P Goddard	Claremont RR	38:28
1992	M McLeod	Elswick Harriers	27:59	E Robinson	North East Vets	34:34
1993	M McLeod	Elswick Harriers	27:53	A Adams	Chester-le-Street	37:55
1994	M McLeod	Elswick Harriers	29:14	E Robinson	Border AC	34:33
1995	L Atkinson	Morpeth Harriers	28:02	S Allen	Houghton & Peterlee	33:05
1996	I Haggan	Sunderland Harriers	29:41	S Allen	Houghton & Peterlee	33:25
1997	A Dent	Blaydon H & AC	29:06	L Harding	Houghton & Peterlee	32:58
1998	D Mullen	Sunderland Harriers	29:13	H Robinson	Chester-le-Street	33:35
1999	D Mullen	Sunderland Harriers	29:11	H Robinson	Chester-le-Street	33:40
2000	D Mullen	Sunderland Harriers	28:46	T Thomson	Pitreavie	32:14
2001	L Atkinson	Morpeth Harriers	29:09	T Thomson	Pitreavie	32:34
2002	R Hand	Durham City Harriers	28:34	P Affleck	Gala Harriers	34:25
2003	B Rushworth	Sunderland Harriers	28:35	A Raw	Darlington Harriers	35:32
2004	P Embleton	Chester-le-Street	30:49	C Bowman	Chester-le-Street	38:48
2005	D Robertson	Sunderland Harriers	29:36	H Lambert	North Shields Poly	38:15
2006	B Rushworth	Sunderland Harriers	28:39	L Parker	unattached	36:19
2007	B Rushworth	Sunderland Harriers	29:18	F Lothian	Fife AC	36:34
2008	B Rushworth	Sunderland Harriers	30:14	H Robinson	Chester-le-Street	38:26
2009	Brian Rushworth	Sunderland Harriers	30:11	Yamuna Thiru	Elswick	36:43
2010	Gary Moore	North Shields Poly	31:42	Yamuna Thiru	Elswick	36:54
2011	Ian Hudspith	Morpeth Harriers	28:37	Caroline Acaster	Blaydon Harriers	39:25
2012	Ian Hudspith	Morpeth Harriers	27:51	Yamuna Thiru	Elswick	35:32
2013	Ian Hudspith	Morpeth Harriers	27:19	Sue Phillips	Darlington Harriers	36:46
2014	Ian Hudspith	Morpeth Harriers	27:20	Joanne Lee	Tynebridge Harriers	36:07
2015	Ian Hudspith	Morpeth Harriers	27:14	Stephanie Dann Maclean	North Shields Poly	33:04
2016	Ian Hudspith	Morpeth Harriers	27:31	Alyson Dixon	Sunderland Strollers	29:48
2017	Ian Hudspith	Morpeth Harriers	28:22	Sonia Samuels	Sale Harriers	29:48
2018	Ian Hudspith	Morpeth Harriers	28:08	Jane Hodgson	Morpeth Harriers	32:09
2019	Terry Scott	Tyne Bridge Harriers	26:20	Alyson Dixon	Sunderland Strollers	28:24
2022	Jarlath McKenna	Bristol and West AC	29:47	Alyson Dixon	Sunderland Strollers	35:08
2023	Graham Rush	Leeds City AC	27:34	Alyson Dixon	Sunderland Strollers	31:52
2024	Stephen Jackson	Sunderland Harriers & AC	29:44	Sonia Samuels	Sale Harriers	31:28
