= 1995 World Marathon Cup =

World Marathon Cup in Athens

The 1995 World Marathon Cup was the sixth edition of the World Marathon Cup of athletics and were held in Athens, Greece.

== Results ==
=== Men ===
Team men
#	Nations	Time
1	Italy; Marco Gozzano; Davide Milesi; Roberto Crosio	6:43:42
2	France; Jean-Marie Gehin; Dominique Chauvelier; Pascal Fetizon	6:48:47
3	Spain; José Ramón Torres; Bartolomé Serrano ? (2:22:34)	6:51:05

Individual men
Rank	Athlete	Country	Time (h:m:s)
1st place, gold medalist(s)	Douglas Wakiihuri	Kenya (KEN)	2:12:01
2nd place, silver medalist(s)	Takahiro Sunada	Japan (JPN)	2:13:16
3rd place, bronze medalist(s)	Davide Milesi	Italy (ITA)	2:13:23
4	José Ramón Torres	Spain (ESP)	2:14:48
5	Moges Taye	Ethiopia (ETH)	2:14:53
6	Marco Gozzano	Italy (ITA)	2:14:58
7	Roberto Crosio	Italy (ITA)	2:15:21
8	Jean-Marie Gehin	France (FRA)	2:15:27
9	Bartolomé Serrano	Spain (ESP)	2:15:43
10	Joseph Skosana	South Africa (RSA)	2:15:47
11	Dominique Chauvelier	France (FRA)	2:15:58
12	Pascal Fetizon	France (FRA)	2:17:22
13	Aleksandr Vikuzanin	Russia (RUS)	2:17:41
14	Shingo Nakamura	Japan (JPN)	2:17:54
15	Vladimir Plykin	Russia (RUS)	2:18:14
16	Anatoliy Archakov	Russia (RUS)	2:18:19
17	Giovanni Ruggiero	Italy (ITA)	2:18:26
18	William Foster	Great Britain (GBR)	2:18:45
19	Tesfaye Tafa	Ethiopia (ETH)	2:18:57
20	Timothy Moni	Kenya (KEN)	2:19:33
21	Peter Lebopo	South Africa (RSA)	2:19:37
22	Gemechu Kebede	Ethiopia (ETH)	2:19:48
23	Alfredo Vigueras	Mexico (MEX)	2:19:59
24	?	?	
25	?	?	
26	?	?	
27	Michael Scout	South Africa (RSA)	2:20:58
28	Spyridon Andriopoulos	Greece (GRE)	2:21:44
29	?	?	
30	?	?	
31	?	?	
32	?	?	
33	?	?	
34	Daniel Rathbone	Great Britain (GBR)	2:22:48
35	?	?	
36	?	?	
37	?	?	
38	?	?	
39	?	?	
Trevor Clark| ? |Great Britain| ? |2:24;10|
41	?	?	
42	?	?	
43	Steve Taylor	United States (USA)	2:24:38
44	Ian Bloomfield	Great Britain (GBR)	2:24:51
45	?	?	
46	Kozu Akutsu	Japan (JPN)	2:25:49
47	Juan Francisco Romera	Spain (ESP)	2:26:07
48	?	?	
49	?	?	
50	Robin Nash	Great Britain (GBR)	2:26:31
51	?	?	
52	?	?	
53	?	?	
54	?	?	
55	?	?	
56	Dave Dunham	United States (USA)	2:27:51
57	?	?	
58	John Makanya	Tanzania (TAN)	2:28:32
59	Zoltan Koszegi	Hungary (HUN)	2:29:25
60	?	?	
61	?	?	
62	?	?	
63	?	?	
64	Paul Rosser	United States (USA)	2:32:01

=== Women ===
Team women
#	Nations	Time
1	Romania; Anuța Catuna; Lidia Șimon; Cristina Pomacu	7:30:21
2	Russia; Larisa Zyusko; Nadezhda Wijenberg; Marina Belyayeva	7:36:37
3	Italy; Ornella Ferrara; Maura Viceconte; Antonella Bizioli	7:38:51

Individual women
Rank	Athlete	Country	Time (h:m:s)
1st place, gold medalist(s)	Anuța Catuna	Romania (ROM)	2:31:10
2nd place, silver medalist(s)	Lidia Șimon	Romania (ROM)	2:31:46
3rd place, bronze medalist(s)	Cristina Pomacu	Romania (ROM)	2:32:09
4	Ornella Ferrara	Italy (ITA)	2:32:56
5	María Luisa Muñoz	Spain (ESP)	2:34:35
6	Larisa Zyusko	Russia (RUS)	2:34:43
7	Cristina Costea	Romania (ROM)	2:34:55
8	Nadezhda Wijenberg	Russia (RUS)	2:35:16
9	Maria Rebelo	France (FRA)	2:35:17
10	Josette Colomb	France (FRA)	2:36:33
11	Marina Belyayeva	Russia (RUS)	2:37:40
12	Adriana Barbu	Romania (ROM)	2:37:46
13	Volha Yudenkova	Belarus (BLR)	2:37:47
14	Emebet Ambossa	Ethiopia (ETH)	2:38:19
15	Maura Viceconte	Italy (ITA)	2:38:22
16	Antonella Bizioli	Italy (ITA)	2:39:28
17	Maryse Le Gallo	France (FRA)	2:39:50
18	Elfenesh Alemu	Ethiopia (ETH)	2:40:04
19	Laura Fogli	Italy (ITA)	2:40:13
20	Firiya Sultanova	Russia (RUS)	2:41:46
21	Natalya Galushko	Belarus (BLR)	2:42:18
22	Maria Luisa Irizar	Spain (ESP)	2:42:24
23	Jocelyne Villeton	France (FRA)	2:42:38
24	Alison Rose	Great Britain (GBR)	2:42:42
25	Trudi Thomson	Great Britain (GBR)	2:42:44
26	Patrizia Ritondo	Italy (ITA)	2:43:05
27	Carolyn Horne	Great Britain (GBR)	2:43:19
28	Svetlana Tkach	Moldova (MDA)	2:45:13
29	Wendy Nelson	United States (USA)	2:45:32
30	Rizia Silva	Brazil (BRA)	2:45:36
31	Isabelle Guillot	France (FRA)	2:46:27
32	Kellie Archuletta	United States (USA)	2:46:40
33	Lesley Turner	Great Britain (GBR)	2:46:46
34	Deborah Torneden	United States (USA)	2:46:52
35	Mary-Lynn Currier	United States (USA)	2:47:17
36	Fikirte Woldemichael	Ethiopia (ETH)	2:47:34
37	Fantaye Sirak	Ethiopia (ETH)	2:48:21
38	Tatyana Titova	Russia (RUS)	2:49:10
39	Yelena Tsukhlo	Belarus (BLR)	2:49:18
40	Montserrat Martinez	Spain (ESP)	2:49:57
41	Maria Polyzou	Greece (GRE)	2:50:04
42	Geny Mascarenho	Brazil (BRA)	2:50:09
43	Elena Plastinina	Ukraine (UKR)	2:52:33
44	Paraskevi Kastriti	Greece (GRE)	2:54:15
45	Panagiota Nikolakopoulou	Greece (GRE)	2:54:32
46	Marie Boyd	United States (USA)	2:55:14
—	Zina Marchant	Great Britain (GBR)	DNF
