= 1994 New York City Marathon =

Footrace held in New York City

25th New York City Marathon
- Venue: New York City, New York
- Date: November 6

Champions
- Men: Germán Silva (2:11:21)
- Women: Tegla Loroupe (2:27:37)

The 1994 New York City Marathon was the 25th running of the annual marathon race in New York City, New York, which took place on Sunday, November 6. The men's elite race was won by Mexico's Germán Silva in a time of 2:11:21 hours while the women's race was won by Kenya's Tegla Loroupe in 2:27:37. Loroupe became the first African woman to win a major global-level marathon.

A total of 29,735 runners finished the race, 22,758 men and 6977 women.

== Results ==
=== Men ===
Position	Athlete	Nationality	Time
1st place, gold medalist(s)	Germán Silva	Mexico	2:11:21
2nd place, silver medalist(s)	Benjamín Paredes	Mexico	2:11:23
3rd place, bronze medalist(s)	Arturo Barrios	Mexico	2:11:43
4	Sammy Lelei	Kenya	2:12:24
5	Domingos Castro	Portugal	2:12:49
6	Kenjiro Jitsui	Japan	2:13:01
7	Leszek Bebło	Poland	2:13:12
8	Isidro Rico	Mexico	2:13:22
9	Salvatore Bettiol	Italy	2:13:44
10	Michael Kapkiai	Kenya	2:14:38
11	Carlos Tarazona	Venezuela	2:14:53
12	Lawrence Peu	South Africa	2:17:02
13	William Koech	Kenya	2:18:08
14	Thomas Osano	Kenya	2:18:43
15	Joaquim Pinheiro	Portugal	2:18:45
16	Volmir Herbstrith	Brazil	2:19:26
17	Gianni Poli	Italy	2:19:27
18	Leandro Croce	Italy	2:20:06
19	Dominique Chauvelier	France	2:20:44
20	Luiz Carlos da Silva	Brazil	2:20:56
—	Paul Pilkington	United States	DNF
—	Vincent Rousseau	Belgium	DNF
—	Salvador García	Mexico	DNF

=== Women ===
Position	Athlete	Nationality	Time
1st place, gold medalist(s)	Tegla Loroupe	Kenya	2:27:37
2nd place, silver medalist(s)	Madina Biktagirova	Belarus	2:30:00
3rd place, bronze medalist(s)	Anne-Marie Lauck	United States	2:30:19
4	Anuța Cătună	Romania	2:31:26
5	Claudia Lokar	Germany	2:31:47
6	Olga Appell	United States	2:32:45
7	Ritva Lemettinen	Finland	2:33:11
8	Albertina Dias	Portugal	2:34:14
9	Alena Peterková	Czech Republic	2:35:43
10	Nadezhda Wijenberg	Russia	2:38:42
11	Adriana Barbu	Romania	2:39:22
12	Emma Scaunich	Italy	2:41:52
13	Gordon Bakoulis	United States	2:45:28
14	Gillian Horovitz	United Kingdom	2:48:24
15	Yelena Plastinina	Ukraine	2:49:54
16	Christina Scobey	United States	2:51:31
17	Martine Rapin	France	2:52:02
18	Marie-Christine Faure	France	2:52:27
20	Amy Kattwinkel	United States	2:53:09
—	Kim Jones	United States	DNF
—	Nadia Prasad	New Caledonia	DNF
