= 1994 African Junior Athletics Championships =

1st African Junior Championships
- Dates: 6 – 8 July
- Host city: Algiers, Algeria
- Level: Under-20
- Events: 40

The 1994 African Junior Athletics Championships was the first edition of the biennial, continental athletics tournament for African athletes aged 19 years or younger. It was held in Algiers, Algeria, from 6–8 July. A total of forty events were contested, 21 by men and 19 by women.

== Medal table ==
* Host nation (Algeria)

Rank	NOC	Gold	Silver	Bronze	Total
1	South Africa (RSA)	12	5	5	22
2	Algeria (ALG)	6	10	9	25
3	Nigeria (NGR)	5	4	1	10
4	Ethiopia (ETH)	4	4	5	13
5	Kenya (KEN)	4	3	1	8
6	Morocco (MAR)	3	2	7	12
7	Egypt (EGY)	1	4	2	7
8	Burkina Faso (BUR)	1	3	0	4
9	Tunisia (TUN)	1	2	5	8
10	Ghana (GHA)	1	1	0	2
11	Namibia (NAM)	1	0	3	4
12	Seychelles (SEY)	1	0	0	1
13	Senegal (SEN)	0	1	0	1
14	Mali (MLI)	0	0	1	1
Totals (14 entries)		40	39	39	118

== Medal summary ==
=== Men ===
Event	Gold		Silver		Bronze	
100 metres	Deji Aliu (NGR)	10.61	Rudolph Louw (RSA)	10.87	Etienne Roux (RSA)	10.89
200 metres (Wind: +3.5)	Deji Aliu (NGR)	21.34 w	Jacques Sambou (SEN)	21.85 w	Liod Kgopong (RSA)	21.92 w
400 metres	Riaan Dempers (RSA)	46.92	Francis Obikwelu (NGR)	47.22	Adem Hecini (ALG)	47.56
800 metres	Bekele Banbere (ETH)	1:48.43	Elijah Maru (KEN)	1:48.63	Mengesha Feyesa (ETH)	1:49.60
1500 metres	Philip Mosima (KEN)	3:44.52	Ali Hakimi (TUN)	3:45.07	Bekele Banbere (ETH)	3:46.50
5000 metres	Daniel Komen (KEN)	13:31.10	Habte Jifar (ETH)	13:53.36	Mohammed Amyn (MAR)	13:54.36
10,000 metres	Habte Jifar (ETH)	30:06.35	Tekalegne Shewaye (ETH)	30:06.76	Abdellah Maaraf (MAR)	30:24.29
110 metres hurdles (Wind: +2.2)	Amine Harchouche (ALG)	14.73 w	Samir Bouabcha (ALG)	15.55 w	Only two finishers	
400 metres hurdles	Amine Harchouche (ALG)	52.77	Jaco Jonker (RSA)	52.92	Faycal Kacemi (MAR)	53.54
3000 metres steeplechase	Irba Lakhal (MAR)	8:36.08	Paul Chemase (KEN)	8:36.81	Lemma Alemayehu (ETH)	8:43.67
4×100 m relay	South Africa (RSA); Etienne Roux; Dirk Pretorius; Rudolph Louw; Riaan Dempers	41.12	Algeria (ALG); Yacine Djellil; Fethi Jedai; Toufik Sekat; Djabir Saïd-Guerni	41.58	Namibia (NAM); Elroy Diegaart; V. Rugen; T. Adwinga; Stephan Louw	41.63
4×400 m relay	South Africa (RSA); Liod Kgopong; Pieter van Tonder; Dirk Pretorius; Riaan Dempers	3:09.66	Nigeria (NGR); Kunle Adejuyigbe; Wilson Ogbeide; Francis Obikwelu; Sylvester Omodiale	3:10.37	Algeria (ALG); Adem Hecini; Amine Harchouche; Mohamed-Lami Naamane; Yacine Djellil	3:14.65
High jump	Younès Moudrik (MAR)	2.12 m	Abderrahmane Hammad (ALG)	2.09 m	Hassan Darwish (EGY)	2.06 m
Pole vault	Rafik Mefti (ALG)	4.50 m	Mohamed Benyahia (ALG)	4.40 m	Mohamed Bédioui (TUN)	4.00 m
Long jump	François Coetzee (RSA)	7.54 m	Nabil Adamou (ALG)	7.35 m	Younès Moudrik (MAR)	7.31 m
Triple jump	Nabil Adamou (ALG)	14.91 m	Assama Ibrahim (EGY)	14.86 m	Djamel Smichet (ALG)	14.78 m
Shot put	Frantz Kruger (RSA)	14.17 m	Walid Jamil Mustapha (EGY)	13.95 m	Hisham El-Achmawi (EGY)	13.26 m
Discus throw	Frantz Kruger (RSA)	55.86 m	Hisham El-Achmawi (EGY)	44.10 m	Abderrazak Yahiaoui (ALG)	43.38 m
Hammer throw	Mohamed Karim Horchani (TUN)	61.84 m	Bounab Zaki (ALG)	51.08 m	Samir Kacimi (ALG)	48.84 m
Javelin throw	Marius Corbett (RSA)	74.42 m	Chemseddine Bel Hadj Amor (TUN)	59.12 m	Fahem Bel Hadj Mabrouk (TUN)	57.74 m
Decathlon	Donny Magnan (SEY)	6360 pts	Mohamed Halima Mansour (ALG)	6222 pts	Mehdi Mekki (TUN)	5975 pts

=== Women ===
Event	Gold		Silver		Bronze	
100 metres	Philomena Mensah (GHA)	11.47	Heide Seyerling (RSA)	11.69	Mercy Nku (NGR)	11.71
200 metres	Heide Seyerling (RSA)	23.59	Philomena Mensah (GHA)	23.88	Tamaryn Sawyer (RSA)	24.09
400 metres	Olabisi Afolabi (NGR)	53.59	Florence Ekpo-Umoh (NGR)	54.25	Yolande Venter (RSA)	55.00
800 metres	Marie-Louise Henning (RSA)	2:05.82	Kutre Dulecha (ETH)	2:07.79	Shura Hotesa (ETH)	2:07.81
1500 metres	Sally Barsosio (KEN)	4:16.61	Kutre Dulecha (ETH)	4:18.13	Rose Cheruiyot (KEN)	4:22.38
3000 metres	Sally Barsosio (KEN)	8:53.40	Rose Cheruiyot (KEN)	9:04.80	Birhan Dagne (ETH)	9:10.47
10,000 metres	Birhan Dagne (ETH)	33:49.10	Getenesh Tamirat (ETH)	34:56.88	Fatiha Klilech (MAR)	36:11.13
100 metres hurdles	Adri van der Merwe (RSA)	13.95	Nadine Fensham (RSA)	14.07	Willa van Schalkwyk (NAM)	15.12
400 metres hurdles	Ronelle Ullrich (RSA)	59.92	Amina Belkrochi (MAR)	60.24	Adri van der Merwe (RSA)	60.84
4×100 m relay	Nigeria (NGR); Mercy Nku; Endurance Ojokolo; Olabisi Afolabi; Florence Ekpo-Umoh	46.15	South Africa (RSA); Tamaryn Sawyer; Ronelle Ullrich; Nadine Fensham; Heide Seyerling	46.15	Algeria (ALG); Baya Rahouli; Ahlam Allali; Nahida Touhami; Leila Kabouss	48.58
4×400 m relay	South Africa (RSA); Yolande Venter; Marie-Louise Henning; Ronelle Ullrich; Adri van der Merwe	3:45.25	Nigeria (NGR); Mercy Nku; Endurance Ojokolo; Olabisi Afolabi; Florence Ekpo-Umoh	3:45.41	Morocco (MAR); Nawel Benhamoun; Hasna Benhassi; M. Klilech; Amina Belkrochi	3:57.42
5000 metres walk	Yakobe Amsale (ETH)	24:11.45	Nagwa Ibrahim (EGY)	24:28.03	Nadia El-Aaouni (MAR)	26:22.71
High jump	Orla Venter (NAM)	1.68 m	Irène Tiéndrebeogo (BUR)	1.65 m	Annerie De Klerk (NAM)	1.60 m
Long jump	Endurance Ojokolo (NGR)	5.56 m	Baya Rahouli (ALG)	5.41 m	Salimata Sylla (MLI)	5.40 m
Triple jump	Baya Rahouli (ALG)	12.02 m	Chantal Ouoba (BUR)	11.96 m	Radia Mellal (ALG)	11.15 m
Shot put	Iman Mahrous (EGY)	11.99 m	Saadia Amloud (MAR)	11.99 m	Malika Hammou (ALG)	11.03 m
Discus throw	Saadia Amloud (MAR)	43.46 m	Malika Hammou (ALG)	34.20 m	Nadia Saichi (ALG)	29.80 m
Javelin throw	Malika Hammou (ALG)	39.78 m	Marie-Antoinette Marchal (BUR)	37.26 m	Aïda Sellam (TUN)	36.28 m
Heptathlon	Marie-Antoinette Marchal (BUR)	4793 pts	Hamida Rahouli (ALG)	4235 pts	Sana Drid (TUN)	4232 pts
