= Arturo Barrios =

Mexican long-distance runner

Personal information
- Born: December 12, 1962 (age 63) Mexico City, Mexico

Sport
- Sport: Track and field

Achievements and titles
- Olympic finals: 1988; 10,000 m, 5th 1992; 10,000 m, 5th
- World finals: 1987; 10,000 m, 4th
- Personal best: 10,000 m: 27:08.23 (1989) (NR) (former WR)
Medal record
Representing Mexico
Men's athletics
World Marathon Majors
Bronze medal – third place	1993 New York	Marathon
Bronze medal – third place	1994 New York	Marathon
Pan American Games
Gold medal – first place	1987 Indianapolis	5000 metres
Gold medal – first place	1991 Havana	5000 metres
CAC Junior Championships (U20)
Gold medal – first place	1980 Nassau	1500 m
Gold medal – first place	1980 Nassau	5000 m
Gold medal – first place	1980 Nassau	10,000 m
Pan American Junior Championships
Gold medal – first place	1980 Sudbury	5000 m
Bronze medal – third place	1980 Sudbury	2000 m s'chase

Arturo Barrios Flores (born December 12, 1962) is a Mexican and American long-distance runner who set the 10,000 m world record in 1989, the one hour world record in 1991, and the 20,000 m world record en route to the one hour run world record. He placed third in the 1993 New York City Marathon and 1994 New York City Marathon. He also finished fifth in the 10,000 meters at the 1988 Summer Olympics and 1992 Summer Olympics and fourth in the event at the 1987 World Athletics Championships.

== Career ==
Barrios finished in fifth place in the 10,000 metres at the 1988 Summer Olympics. He is a former world record holder at the 10,000 m (27:08.23, set on August 18, 1989, at the Internationales Stadionfest (ISTAF) in Berlin, Germany). Barrios' record was not broken until 1993 when Richard Chelimo ran 27:07.91 in Stockholm. This mark stood as the North American record until May 1, 2010, and still stands as the national record of Mexico.

On March 30, 1991, Barrios set world records at one hour (21.101 km) and 20,000 m (56:55.6). These records stood until June 2007, when they were broken by Haile Gebrselassie. Barrios' 1991 performance makes him the first man ever to run a half-marathon distance in less than one hour; the first to do so in an actual half-marathon competition was Moses Tanui in 1993. That performance also still stands as the North American records and the Mexican record for those two events.

In 1992 he participated in the World Cup in Athletics, running the 5000 m with a time of 13:50.95, finishing in second place.

Between 1987 and 1990, Barrios won the San Francisco Bay to Breakers race, considered the largest footrace in the world, four consecutive times.

Barrios became a United States citizen in September 1994. Barrios graduated from Texas A&M University in 1985 where he competed in track and cross country for the Aggies. Barrios was inducted into the Texas A&M Athletic Hall of Fame in 1998.

The annual Arturo Barrios Invitational 5K and 10K road races in Chula Vista, California, launched in 1989, were held for the last time in 2006.

== Personal records ==
Distance	Time	Date	Venue
1500 metres	3:37.61	13 August 1989	Hengelo, Netherlands
3000 metres	7:35.71	10 July 1989	Nice, France
5000 metres	13:07.79	14 July 1989	London, United Kingdom
10,000 metres	27:08.23	18 August 1989	Berlin, Germany
15,000 metres	42:36	29 July 1986	Portland, United States
20,000 metres	56:55.6	30 March 1991	La Fléche, France

Time	Distance	Date	Location
One Hour	21.101 km	30 March 1991	La Fléche, France

== Achievements ==
Year	Competition	Venue	Position	Event	Notes
Representing Mexico
1980	Central American and Caribbean Junior Championships (U-20)	Nassau, Bahamas	1st	1500 m	3:49.8
1980	Central American and Caribbean Junior Championships (U-20)	Nassau, Bahamas	1st	5000 m	14:26.4
1980	Central American and Caribbean Junior Championships (U-20)	Nassau, Bahamas	1st	10000 m	31:20.4
1988	Ibero-American Championships	Mexico City, Mexico	1st	5000m	14:10.72 A

Records
Preceded by Fernando Mamede	Men's 10,000 m World Record Holder; August 18, 1989 – July 5, 1993	Succeeded by Richard Chelimo
