= Silverstone Half Marathon =

- Silverstone Half Marathon Logo
- Date: March
- Location: Silverstone Circuit, Northamptonshire, United Kingdom
- Event type: Road
- Distance: Half Marathon
- Established: 2003
- Website: www.adidashalfmarathon.co.uk

Adidas Silverstone Half Marathon is a road half marathon that was held each year on the Silverstone Circuit between 2003 and 2017, usually in March. The race did not occur in 2018. It will occur on 24 November 2019 organised by The Race Organiser Ltd. It was sponsored by Adidas, and was known as the Adidas Silverstone Half Marathon.

Recent winners

Table of recent winners.

Year	Date	Men's winner	Time (h:m:s)	Women's winner	Time (h:m:s)
2017	12 March	David Hudson	1:12:15	Tori Green	1:22:21
2016	13 March	Michael Aldridge	1:13:06	Nicki Nealon	1:23:00
2015	15 March	William Mycroft	1:10:59	Hannah Turner	1:24:12
2014	2 March	Chris Thompson	1:05:08	Imogen Keane	1:24:12
2013	3 March	Scott Overall	1:05:41	Sarah Ivory	1:22:34
2012	11 March	Scott Overall	1:09:46	Sally Baker	1:26:42
2011	6 March	Andi Jones	1:08:25	Kirsty Gallagher	1:23:20
2010	14 March	Toby Lambert	1:07:26	Liz Yelling	1:14:50
2009	15 March	Darran Bilton	1:07:23	Juliet Doyle	1:17:26
2008		Tim Hartley	1:08:07	Liz Yelling	1:12:46
2007		Hendrick Ramaala	1:06:53	Liz Yelling	1:14:34
2006	19 March	David Mitchinson	1:07:08	Jude Craft	1:20:36
2005	13 March	Matt Smith	1:05:23	Birhan Dagne	1:16:25
2004	7 March	Matt Smith	1:06:57	Birhan Dagne	1:15:54
2003		Matt O'Dowd	1:05:40	Amy Stiles	1:15:11
