= Janete Mayal =

Brazilian long-distance runner

Personal information
- Nationality: Brazilian
- Born: 19 July 1963 (age 62)

Sport
- Sport: Long-distance running
- Event: Marathon

Janete Mayal (born 19 July 1963) is a Brazilian long-distance runner. She competed in the women's marathon at the 1992 Summer Olympics.
