= Pavel Kokin =

Russian long-distance runner

Personal information
- Nationality: Russian
- Born: 21 July 1974 (age 51)

Sport
- Sport: Long-distance running
- Event: Marathon

Pavel Kokin (born 21 July 1974) is a Russian long-distance runner. He competed in the men's marathon at the 2000 Summer Olympics, the same year he won the Cleveland Marathon in 2:10.29. He finished the Olympic marathon in Sydney with a time of 2:18.02 in 26th place.
