= Christine Bakombo =

Congolese long-distance runner

Personal information
- Nationality: Congolese
- Born: 7 August 1962 (age 63)

Sport
- Sport: Long-distance running
- Event: Marathon

Kungu "Christine" Bakombo (born 7 August 1962) is a Congolese long-distance runner. She competed in the women's marathon at the 1992 Summer Olympics.
