= Athletics at the 1992 Summer Olympics – Women's marathon =

Women's marathon at the Games of the XXV Olympiad
- Venue: Estadi Olímpic Lluís Companys, Barcelona
- Dates: August 1
- Competitors: 47 from 31 nations
- Winning time: 2:32:41

Medalists
1st place, gold medalist(s)		Valentina Yegorova	Unified Team
2nd place, silver medalist(s)		Yuko Arimori	Japan
3rd place, bronze medalist(s)		Lorraine Moller	New Zealand

The Women's Marathon at the 1992 Summer Olympics in Barcelona, Spain was held on Saturday August 1, 1992. The race started on 6.30 p.m. local time. A total number of 37 athletes completed the race, with Bakombo Kungu from Zaire finishing in last position in 3:29:10. There were 47 competitors from 31 countries. Nine of them did not finish. The winning margin was 8 seconds.

After finishing fourth, Madina Biktagirova of the Unified Team tested positive for norephedrine and became the first Olympic marathoner disqualified for failing a drug test.

== Medalists ==
Gold	Valentina Yegorova; Unified Team
Silver	Yuko Arimori; Japan
Bronze	Lorraine Moller; New Zealand

== Abbreviations ==
- All times shown are in hours:minutes:seconds

DNS	did not start
NM	no mark
OR	olympic record
WR	world record
AR	area record
NR	national record
PB	personal best
SB	season best

== Records ==
Standing records prior to the 1992 Summer Olympics
World Record	Ingrid Kristiansen (NOR)	2:21:06	April 21, 1985	London, United Kingdom
Olympic Record	Joan Benoit (USA)	2:24:52	August 5, 1984	Los Angeles, United States
Season Best	Olga Markova (RUS)	2:23:43	April 20, 1992	Boston, United States

== Final ranking ==
Place	Athlete	Time
	Valentina Yegorova (EUN)	2:32:41
	Yuko Arimori (JPN)	2:32:49
	Lorraine Moller (NZL)	2:33:59
4.	Sachiko Yamashita (JPN)	2:36:26
5.	Katrin Dörre (GER)	2:36:48
6.	Mun Gyong-ae (PRK)	2:37:03
7.	Manuela Machado (POR)	2:38:22
8.	Ramilya Burangulova (EUN)	2:38:46
9.	Colleen De Reuck (RSA)	2:39:03
10.	Cathy O'Brien (USA)	2:39:42
11.	Karolina Szabó (HUN)	2:40:10
12.	Francie Larrieu Smith (USA)	2:41:09
13.	Sally Eastall (GBR)	2:41:20
14.	Ritva Lemettinen (FIN)	2:41:48
15.	Birgit Jerschabek (GER)	2:42:45
16.	Véronique Marot (GBR)	2:42:55
17.	Márcia Narloch (BRA)	2:44:32
18.	Emma Scaunich (ITA)	2:46:14
19.	Odette Lapierre (CAN)	2:46:18
20.	Anna Villani (ITA)	2:46:44
21.	Janis Klecker (USA)	2:47:17
22.	Wanda Panfil (POL)	2:47:27
23.	Bettina Sabatini (ITA)	2:50:09
24.	Alena Peterková (TCH)	2:53:30
25.	Lee Mi-Ok (KOR)	2:54:21
26.	Małgorzata Birbach (POL)	2:54:33
27.	Sally Ellis (GBR)	2:54:41
28.	Pascaline Wangui (KEN)	2:56:46
29.	Yumi Kokamo (JPN)	2:58:18
30.	Addis Gezahegn (ETH)	2:58:27
31.	Janete Mayal (BRA)	3:00:23
32.	Elena Murgoci (ROU)	3:01:46
33.	Vilma Peña (CRC)	3:03:34
34.	Ena Guevara (PER)	3:05:50
35.	Ana Gutiérrez (ISV)	3:14:02
36.	Jen Allred (GUM)	3:14:45
37.	Christine Bakombo (ZAI)	3:29:10
—	Aurora Cunha (POR)	DNF
—	Olga Appell (MEX)	DNF
—	Franziska Moser (SUI)	DNF
—	Đặng Thị Tèo (VIE)	DNF
—	Lizanne Bussieres (CAN)	DNF
—	Maria Rebelo (FRA)	DNF
—	Cornelia Melis (ARU)	DNF
—	Marguerite Buist (NZL)	DNF
—	Lisa Ondieki (AUS)	DNF
—	Madina Biktagirova (EUN)	DSQ

== See also ==
- 1990 Women's European Championships Marathon (Split)
- 1991 Women's World Championships Marathon (Tokyo)
- 1992 Marathon Year Ranking
- 1993 Women's World Championships Marathon (Stuttgart)
- 1994 Women's European Championships Marathon (Helsinki)
