= Kamila Gradus =

Polish long-distance runner

Kamila Gradus (born 19 March 1967 in Warsaw, Mazowieckie) is a retired Polish marathon runner, who represented her native country at the 1996 Summer Olympics in Atlanta, Georgia.

== Achievements ==
- All results regarding marathon, unless stated otherwise

Year	Competition	Venue	Position	Notes
Representing Poland
1991	World Championships	Tokyo, Japan	6th	2:32:09
1993	Nagoya Marathon	Nagoya, Japan	1st	2:27:38
1993	World Championships	Stuttgart, Germany	9th	2:36:48
1995	Nagoya Marathon	Nagoya, Japan	1st	2:27:29
1996	Olympic Games	Atlanta, United States	—	DNF

== See also ==
- Polish records in athletics
