= Đặng Thị Tèo =

Vietnamese long-distance runner (born 1968)

Personal information
- Nationality: Vietnamese
- Born: 19 July 1968 (age 58)
- Spouse: Trần Đình Khương
- Children: 2

Sport
- Sport: Long-distance running
- Event: Marathon

Đặng Thị Tèo (born 19 July 1968) is a Vietnamese former long-distance runner.

== Career ==
She is one of the first two Vietnamese women to compete in women's marathon.

She competed in the women's marathon at the 1992 Summer Olympics, but did not finish the race.

In 1997, after giving birth her first child, she retired.

== Personal life ==
As of 2006, she married Trần Đình Khương (a train driver) and has two children, the first one is a male born in 1997.
