= 1991 World Championships in Athletics – Women's marathon =

Long distance running race at the 1991 World Championships in Athletics

Women's marathon at the 1991 World Championships
- Venue: National Stadium, Tokyo
- Date: 25 August 1991
- Competitors: 39 from 25 nations
- Winning time: 2:29:53

Medalists
gold medal	Wanda Panfil	Poland
silver medal	Sachiko Yamashita	Japan
bronze medal	Katrin Dörre	Germany

The women's marathon was one of the road events at the 1991 World Championships in Athletics in Tokyo, Japan. It took place on 25 August 1991; the course started and finished at the National Stadium. The race was won by Poland's Wanda Panfil in 2:29:53, ahead of Sachiko Yamashita of Japan in second and Germany's Katrin Dörre in third.

== Final ranking ==
Results
Rank	Name	Nationality	Time	Notes
1st place, gold medalist(s)	Wanda Panfil	Poland	2:29:53	
2nd place, silver medalist(s)	Sachiko Yamashita	Japan	2:29:57	
3rd place, bronze medalist(s)	Katrin Dörre	Germany	2:30:10	
4	Yuko Arimori	Japan	2:31:08	
5	Maria Rebelo	France	2:32:05	
6	Kamila Gradus	Poland	2:32:09	
7	Manuela Machado	Portugal	2:32:33	
8	Ramilya Burangulova	Soviet Union	2:33:00	
9	Iris Biba	Germany	2:33:48	
10	Sally Ellis	Great Britain & N.I.	2:35:09	
11	Sally Eastall	Great Britain & N.I.	2:36:16	
12	Kumi Araki	Japan	2:38:27	
13	Joy Smith	United States	2:39:16	
14	María Trujillo	United States	2:39:28	
15	Fabiola Rueda	Colombia	2:41:51	
16	Sissel Grottenberg	Norway	2:43:11	
17	Franziska Moser	Switzerland	2:44:07	
18	Pascaline Wangui	Kenya	2:45:22	
19	Ena Guevara	Peru	2:48:53	
20	Françoise Bonnet	France	2:48:57	
21	Cornelia Melis	Aruba	2:58:18	
22	Yi-Lo Man	Hong Kong	2:59:39	
23	Gina Coello	Honduras	2:59:54	NR
24	Graciela Caizabanda	Ecuador	3:00:03	
–	Chen Qingmei	China	DNF	
–	Aurora Cunha	Portugal	DNF	
–	Joke Kleijweg	Netherlands	DNF	
–	Veronique Marot	Great Britain & N.I.	DNF	
–	Ludmila Melicherová	Czechoslovakia	DNF	
–	Rosa Mota	Portugal	DNF	
–	Márcia Narloch	Brazil	DNF	
–	Dorthe Rasmussen	Denmark	DNF	
–	Anna Villani	Italy	DNF	
–	Tatyana Zuyeva	Soviet Union	DNF	
–	Laura Fogli	Italy	DNF	
–	Valentina Yegorova	Soviet Union	DNF	
–	Gordon Bloch	United States	DNF	
–	Isabel Canto	Guatemala	DNF	
–	Sandra Natal	Dominican Republic	DNF	

== See also ==
- 1988 Women's Olympic Marathon (Seoul)
- 1990 Women's European Championships Marathon (Split)
- 1992 Women's Olympic Marathon (Barcelona)
- 1994 Women's European Championships Marathon (Helsinki)
