= Addis Gezahegn =

Ethiopian long-distance runner

Personal information
- Nationality: Ethiopian
- Born: 1969 (age 56–57)

Sport
- Sport: Long-distance running
- Event: Marathon

Addis Gezahegn (born 1969) is an Ethiopian long-distance runner. She competed in the women's marathon at the 1992 Summer Olympics.
