= Teruko Oe =

Japanese long-distance runner

Teruko Ōe (大江 光子, Ōe Teruko; born June 16, 1969) is a retired female long-distance runner from Japan, who won the 1992 edition of Nagoya Marathon on March 1, 1992, clocking a total time of 2:31:04.

== Achievements ==
Year	Competition	Venue	Position	Event	Notes
Representing Japan
1992	Nagoya Marathon	Nagoya, Japan	1st	Marathon	2:31:04
