= Honorato Hernández =

Spanish long-distance runner

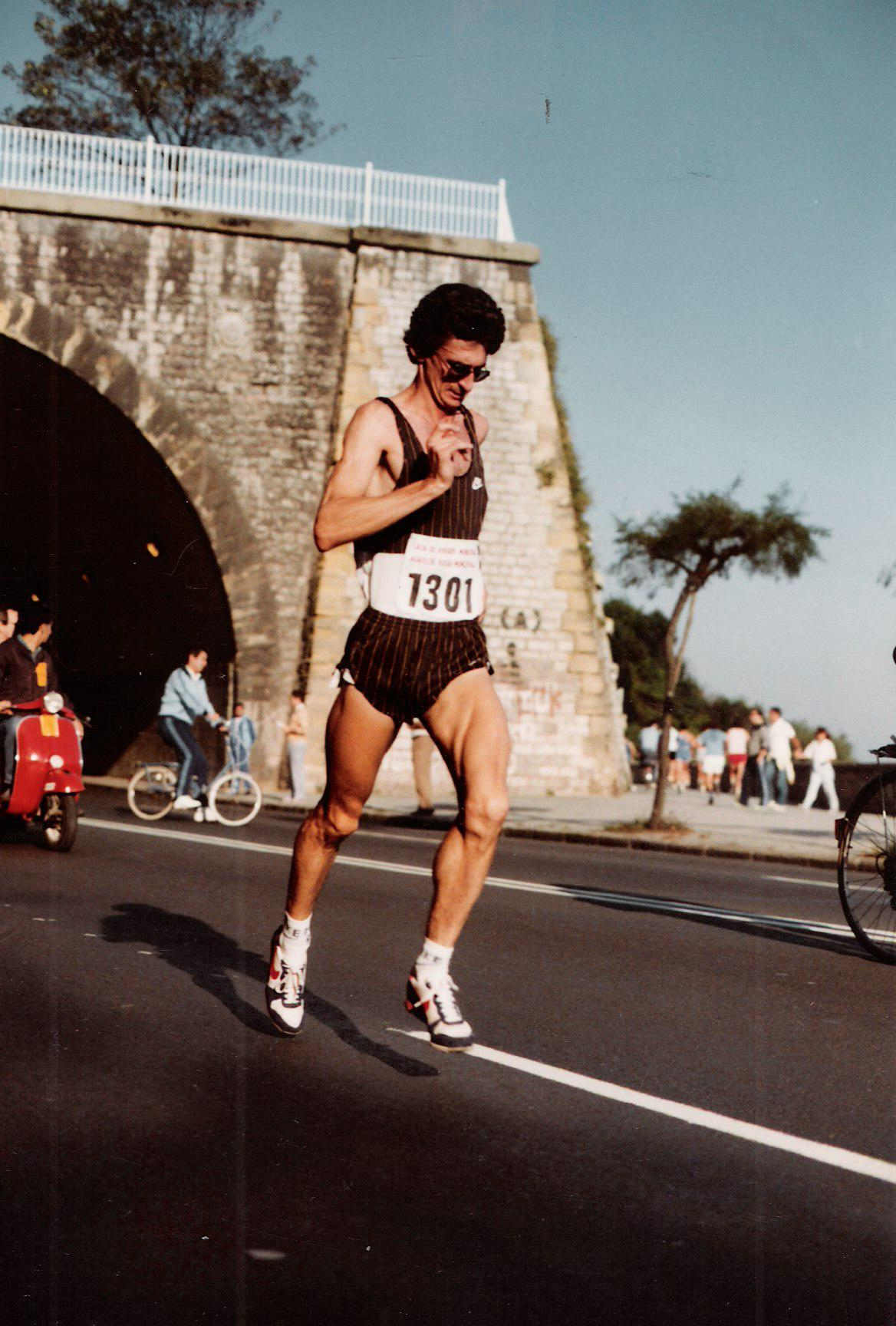
- Honorato Hernández in 1985

Personal information
- Nationality: Spanish
- Born: 29 June 1956 (age 70)

Sport
- Sport: Long-distance running
- Event: Marathon

Honorato Hernández (born 29 June 1956) is a Spanish long-distance runner. He competed in the men's marathon at the 1988 Summer Olympics. He was born in Salamanca. He won a bronze medal in Casablanca at the 1983 Mediterranean Games in the marathon with a time of 2:23:15. His P.R. for the distance is 2:12:47, set at the 1990 London Marathon.
