= Run to the Beat =

Half-marathon/10 km race in London

- Date: 2008 - 2013
- Location: London, United Kingdom
- Event type: Road
- Distance: Half Marathon, 10km from 2014.
- Established: 2008
- Website: www.runtothebeat.co.uk

Run to the Beat, first held in 2008, was the first half marathon event in London, taking its name from the use of music along the route. It was initially organised by IMG, and held each autumn in south-east London until 2013, attracting, at its peak, some 19,000 runners. From 2014, it became a 10 km event elsewhere in London.

== History ==
Organisers expected more than 12,000 runners to take part in the inaugural race in Greenwich on 5 October 2008. But bad weather on the day and tube delays saw just 7252 runners cross the startline. Of those 55% were female and 45% were male. The first event was sponsored by Sony Ericsson, who returned as sponsor in 2009; Nike was official sponsor from 2011 to 2013. The event raised money for its official charity, Leukaemia Research, raising over £400,000 in 2008.

The 2009 race was held on 27 September 2009.

The route started and finished at The O2. Runners initially headed along the river towards the Thames Barrier, past The Royal Artillery Museum and the Royal Artillery Barracks, and through Greenwich Park. A main stage was located next to the start/finish line and music was played at 16 stages along the route.

After criticisms of the route and organisation in 2012, the route changed for the 2013 event, starting and finishing in Greenwich Park, and many runners among the 19,000 participants experienced even worse problems in this edition, described as 'shambolic'. As a result, this was the final year it was run as a half marathon; it became a 10 km event in Wembley.

The theory behind the event came from Dr Costas Karageorghis, associate professor of sport psychology at Brunel University. He said:

"When carefully selected, our research shows that music can help increase performance levels quite profoundly. ... I will ensure that the tempo and rhythm of the music contour the physiological demands of the event – to provide athletes with the additional motivation needed to pull a great performance out of the bag or even just to help them enjoy the experience a little more."

== Winners ==
=== Men ===
- 2008 John McFarlane, 1:10:12
- 2009 Ezekiel Cherop, 1:03:00
- 2010 Tewodros Shiferaw Asfaw, 1:04:57
- 2011 Milton Kiplagat Rotich, 1:01:20
- 2012 Ryan McKinlay, 1:10:07
- 2013 Ryan McKinlay, 1:12:12
- 2014 Michele Bucci 34:02

=== Women ===
- 2008 Birhan Dagne, 1:18:22
- 2009 Genet Measso, 1:16:15
- 2010 Hellen Jemutai, 1:14:09
- 2011 Alice Mogire, 1:09:52
- 2012 Amy Akhaveissy, 1:22:21
- 2013 Anjli Mapara, 1:26:07
- 2014 Sarah Fowkes 40:02

== See also ==
- The Big Half
