= Steve Taylor (runner) =

American runner (born 1965)

Personal information
- Nationality: USA
- Born: 10 July 1965 (61 years, 23 days old)
- Education: St. Marys High School; West Virginia University; Virginia Tech

Sport
- Sport: Athletics
- Events: 5,000 metres 10,000 metres 10 miles half marathon marathon
- College team: West Virginia Mountaineers; Virginia Tech Hokies

Achievements and titles
- National finals: 1981 Foot Locker Cross Country Championships; • 5,000m, 7th; 1982 Foot Locker Cross Country Championships; • 5,000m, 3rd (bronze); 1987 NCAAs; • 10,000m, 3rd (bronze); 1987 NCAAs; • Cross Country, 9th; 1988 USA Champs; • 10,000m, 1st (gold)
- Personal bests: 5K run: 13:38 (1989) 10K run: 27:59 (1988) 10 miles: 47:01 (1989) Half Marathon: 1:02:29 (1990) Marathon: 2:13:56 (1990)
- Updated on 20 February 2024

Steve Taylor (born 10 July 1965) is an American long-distance runner. He won the 10,000 metres at the 1988 USA Outdoor Track and Field Championships and represented the United States at the 1991 World Marathon Championships (Tokyo, Japan), 1991 World Marathon Cup (London, England), and 1995 World Marathon Cup (Athens, Greece).

== Career ==
Taylor was a top prospect coming out of high school where he claimed 11 state titles and was named West Virginia Track Athlete of the Year three times. As a prep junior he placed 7th in the 1981 Foot Locker Cross Country Championships and returned as a senior to place 3rd in the 1982 Foot Locker Cross Country Championships.

He enrolled at West Virginia University for two years, and then transferred to the Virginia Tech Hokies track and field and cross country programs where he led the 1987 cross country team to a 4th place team finish at the NCAA Championship's with his 9th place individual finish.

He was the top USA finisher in the 1991 World Marathon Cup (London, England), and 1995 World Marathon Cup (Athens, Greece). In the 1991 World Championships men's marathon in Tokyo, Japan he placed 26th as the second USA finisher.

Taylor qualified for the 1988 United States Olympic trials in the 10,000 metres and the 1992 and 1996 trials in the marathon. In 1992 he placed 6th in the United States Olympic trials marathon where he was named an alternate to the Olympic team.

== Personal life ==
Taylor graduated from the West Virginia St. Marys High School in 1983. He ran professionally for New Balance and Nike after graduating college and coached cross country at Virginia Tech for 10 years (1991-2001). In 2001 he became the head cross country and track and field coach for the Richmond Spiders where he continues to serve with his wife, Lori.

In 2013 he founded the "Collegiate Running Association".
