= Nanae Sasaki =

Japanese long-distance runner

Medal record

Women's athletics

Asian Championships
Silver medal – second place	1981 Tokyo	3000 m

Nanae Nagata (永田 七恵, Nagata Nanae), born as Nanae Sasaki (佐々木 七恵, Sasaki Nanae), (February 8, 1956 – June 27, 2009) was a Japanese long-distance runner.

She was a high school teacher in Ōfunato, Iwate when she set a Japanese record of 2:40:56 at the Boston Marathon in 1981.

She quit running as an amateur and began her professional career with the S & B Foods Inc. Athletic Club, which included among its members her coach, Kiyoshi Nakamura, and Toshihiko Seko, then one of the top marathon runners in the world.

She set a new Japanese record of 2:35:00 at the Christchurch Marathon in June 1982.

She won the Tokyo International Women's Marathon in 1983, and she represented Japan at the 1984 Summer Olympics in Los Angeles, California, finishing the race in 19th place, at 2:37:04.

She retired from competition after setting her personal best time of 2:33:57 at the Nagoya Marathon in March 1995, and she then served as a coach at the S & B Athletic Club for a while.

On June 29, 2009, Japanese news media reported that she died on June 27 at the age of 53 due to colorectal cancer.

== Achievements ==
Year	Competition	Venue	Position	Event	Notes
Representing Japan
1981	Boston Marathon	Boston, United States	13th	Marathon	2:41:48
1983	Tokyo Marathon	Tokyo, Japan	1st	Marathon	2:37:09
1984	Olympic Games	Los Angeles, United States	19th	Marathon	2:37:04
1985	Nagoya Marathon	Nagoya, Japan	1st	Marathon	2:33:57
