= Sachiko Yamashita =

Japanese long-distance runner

Sachiko Yamashita (山下 佐知子, Yamashita Sachiko; born August 20, 1964, in Tottori) is a Japanese former long-distance runner, who won the silver medal in the women's marathon at the 1991 World Championships in Athletics in Tokyo.

== Achievements ==
Year	Competition	Venue	Position	Notes
Representing Japan
1991	Nagoya Marathon	Nagoya, Japan	1st	Marathon
1991	World Championships	Tokyo, Japan	2nd	Marathon
1992	Olympic Games	Barcelona, Spain	4th	Marathon
