= 1990 European Athletics Championships – Women's marathon =

Women's marathon at the European Athletics Championships

These are the official results of the Women's marathon event at the 1990 European Championships in Split, Yugoslavia. The race was held on 27 August 1990.

== Medalists ==
Gold	Rosa Mota; Portugal (POR)
Silver	Valentina Yegorova; Soviet Union (URS)
Bronze	Maria Rebelo; France (FRA)

== Abbreviations ==
- All times shown are in hours:minutes:seconds

DNS	did not start
NM	no mark
WR	world record
AR	area record
NR	national record
PB	personal best
SB	season best

== Final ranking ==
Rank	Athlete	Time	Note
1st place, gold medalist(s)	Rosa Mota (POR)	2:31:27	
2nd place, silver medalist(s)	Valentina Yegorova (URS)	2:31:32	
3rd place, bronze medalist(s)	Maria Rebelo (FRA)	2:35:51	
4	Emma Scaunich (ITA)	2:37:19	
5	Judit Földing-Nagy (HUN)	2:37:46	
6	Françoise Bonnet (FRA)	2:37:55	
7	Sissel Grottenberg (NOR)	2:39:04	
8	Sylvianne Geffray (FRA)	2:39:21	
9	Ritva Lemettinen (FIN)	2:39:42	
10	Manuela Machado (POR)	2:39:49	
11	Sally Eastall (GBR)	2:41:37	
12	Christine Kennedy (IRL)	2:41:38	
13	Dimitra Papaspyrou (GRE)	2:41:47	
14	Johanna Homminga (NED)	2:43:04	
15	Nicola McCracken (GBR)	2:46:36	
16	Marina Prat (ESP)	2:47:41	
17	Nelly Aerts (BEL)	2:49:10	
18	Elizabeth Bullen (IRL)	2:53:45	
19	Suzana Ćirić (YUG)	2:54:05	
20	Susan Tooby (GBR)	2:55:22	
21	Rumyana Panovska (BUL)	2:56:46	
DID NOT FINISH (DNF)
—	Tijana Kršek (YUG)	DNF	
—	Conceição Ferreira (POR)	DNF	
—	Jelena Jovičić (YUG)	DNF	
—	Alena Peterková (TCH)	DNF	
—	Yekaterina Khramenkova (URS)	DNF	
—	Lyubov Klochko (URS)	DNF	

== Participation ==
According to an unofficial count, 27 athletes from 16 countries participated in the event.

- Belgium (1)
- Bulgaria (1)
- Czechoslovakia (1)
- Finland (1)
- France (3)
- Greece (1)
- Hungary (1)
- Ireland (2)
- Italy (1)
- Netherlands (1)
- Norway (1)
- Portugal (3)
- Soviet Union (3)
- Spain (1)
- United Kingdom (3)
- Yugoslavia (3)

== See also ==
- 1987 Women's World Championships Marathon (Rome)
- 1988 Women's Olympic Marathon (Seoul)
- 1991 Women's World Championships Marathon (Tokyo)
- 1992 Women's Olympic Marathon (Barcelona)
- 1993 Women's World Championships Marathon (Stuttgart)
