= Philomena Mensah =

Canadian sprinter (born 1975)

Personal information
- Born: May 11, 1975 (age 51) Accra, Ghana

Sport
- Sport: Track and field
Medal record
Women's athletics
Representing Canada
World Indoor Championships
Bronze medal – third place	1999 Maebashi	60 m
Commonwealth Games
Silver medal – second place	1998 Kuala Lumpur	100 m
Representing Ghana
African Championships
Silver medal – second place	1990 Cairo	4×100 m

Philomena Mensah (born May 11, 1975) is a Canadian sprinter. Born in Accra, she previously represented Ghana, but emigrated to Canada following the 1994 Commonwealth Games. She won the bronze medal in the 60 metres event at the 1999 IAAF World Indoor Championships, after having set a personal best in the heats with 7.02 seconds.

== International competitions ==
- 1999 IAAF World Indoor Championships - bronze medal (60 m)
- 1998 Commonwealth Games - silver medal (100 m)
- 1994 African Junior Athletics Championships - gold medal (100 m)
- 1994 African Junior Athletics Championships - bronze medal (200 m)
- 1994 World Junior Championships in Athletics - bronze medal (100 m)
