= Chantal Ouoba =

Burkinabé triple jumper

Personal information
- Nationality: Burkinabé
- Born: 2 September 1975 (age 51)

Sport
- Sport: Athletics
- Event: Triple jump

Chantal Ruth Ouoba (born 2 September 1975) is a Burkinabé athlete. She competed in the women's triple jump at the 1996 Summer Olympics.
