= Jeremy Watson =

Professor of engineering systems

Jeremy Watson CBE FREng
- Born: United Kingdom
- Education: University of Sussex, UK
- Awards: FREng (2010); CBE (2013)
- Scientific career
- Fields: Biomedical electronics, Control engineering, Cybersecurity
- Workplaces: University College London, UK
- Website: https://www.ucl.ac.uk/public-policy/spotlight/prof-jeremy-watson

Jeremy Daniel McKendrick Watson CBE FREng FIET is Emeritus Professor of Engineering Systems at University College London, UK. He was formerly President (2016–17) of the IET.

== Early life ==
Watson studied Electronics at the University of London from 1972 - 1974. He was awarded a master's degree in cybernetics in 1976. In 1982, he completed his PhD degree in biomedical engineering from the University of Sussex, UK.

== Career ==
Following an early career as an electronics designer and product manager at the Eurotherm group, Watson was BOC Edwards Technology Director, then Arup's Global Research Director and, concurrently Chief Scientific Adviser (CSA) for the UK Department of Communities and Local Government (now MHCLG). He later joined the UCL Faculty of Engineering Sciences, initially serving as a Vice-Dean, where he is now Professor of Engineering Systems. (Emeritus from June 2024.) He works within the department of Science Technology Engineering and Public Policy (STEaPP). Watson was also, until 08/21 the Chief Scientist & Engineer of BRE Group, UK. Until 2023, he was a member of the NPL Science and Technology Advisory Committee, and has been a visiting professor at Aston University, the University of Sussex and the University of Southampton, UK. Watson was from 2016 - 2024, the Director and Principal Investigator of the EPSRC-funded PETRAS National Centre of Excellence - a consortium of researchers from 24 universities working on making Internet of Things and Edge systems safe and secure. Following service as a Trustee and Deputy President of the Institution of Engineering and Technology (the IET), Watson was President for 2016-17. He is also a senior life member of the IEEE. Recent interests include work to develop a cross-disciplinary Net Zero What Works Centre (NZWWC). He is a Fellow and recent trustee of the Royal Academy of Engineering, and was founding chair of the National Engineering Policy Centre committee at RAEng. Watson has served on the governing boards of Innovate UK and EPSRC, and was appointed to the UK Committee on Research Integrity (UKCORI) in 2022, where he is specialising in Engineering research integrity and AI. Jeremy Watson is a volunteer (2024 -) and Trustee (2025 -) at Amberley Museum.

== Awards ==
Watson was elected to the Royal Academy of Engineering in 2010. He was awarded a CBE by the Queen for services to Engineering in 2013.
