= Wanda Panfil =

Polish long-distance runner (born 1959)

Personal information
- Born: 26 January 1959 (age 67) Opoczno, Poland

Sport
- Country: Poland
Medal record
Women's athletics
Representing Poland
World Championships
Gold medal – first place	1991 Tokyo	Marathon
- Updated on 28-09-2015

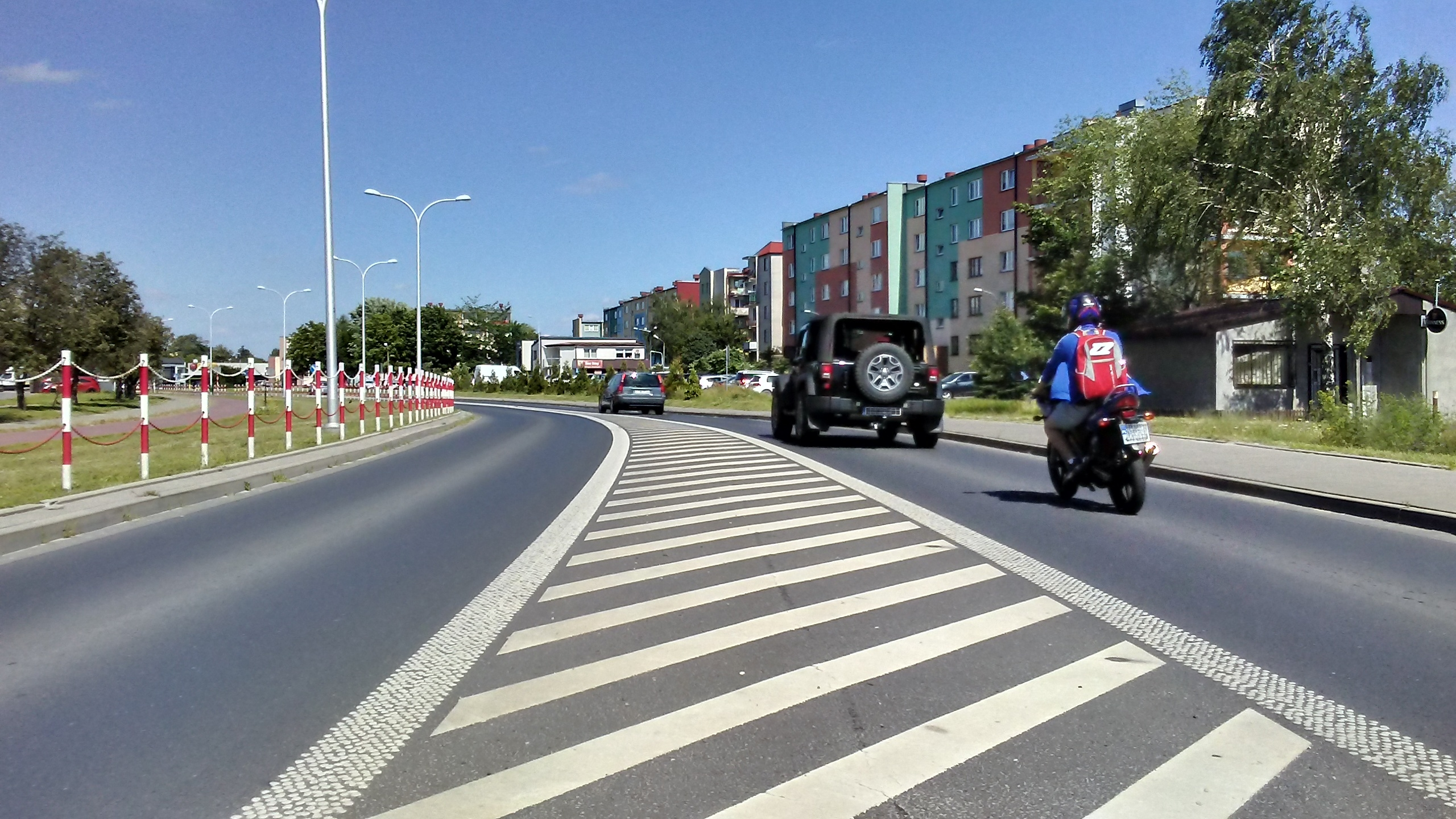
Wanda Panfil street in Tomaszow Mazowiecki, her hometown. The street leads to Tomaszów's Olympians Roundabout

Wanda Marianna Panfil-González, née Panfil, (26 January 1959 in Tomaszów Mazowiecki) is a former long-distance runner from Poland, who won the world title in the women's marathon at the 1991 World Championships in Athletics in Tokyo, Japan. She was married to Mexican long-distance runner Mauricio González.

Panfil twice competed for her native country at the Summer Olympics; in 1988 when she finished 22nd with a 2:34:35, and in 1992 when she finished in 22nd position with a 2:47:27 in the women's marathon. During her career she won the London Marathon, the Boston Marathon, the New York City Marathon and the Nagoya Marathon. In 1990 and 1991 she was named Polish Sportswoman of the Year. Panfil is a four-time national champion in the women's 5.000 metres.

== Achievements ==
Year	Competition	Venue	Position	Event	Notes
Representing Poland
1988	Olympic Games	Seoul, South Korea	22nd	Marathon	2:34:35
1990	Nagoya Marathon	Nagoya, Japan	1st	Marathon	2:31:04
1990	London Marathon	London, United Kingdom	1st	Marathon	2:26:31
1990	Goodwill Games	Seattle, United States	1st	10,000 m	32:01.17
1990	European Championships	Split, Yugoslavia	7th	10,000 m	32:06.01
1990	New York City Marathon	New York, United States	1st	Marathon	2:30:45
1991	Boston Marathon	Boston, United States	1st	Marathon	2:24:18
1991	World Championships	Tokyo, Japan	1st	Marathon	2:29:53
1992	Olympic Games	Barcelona, Spain	22nd	Marathon	2:47:27

== See also ==
- Polish records in athletics

== Bibliography ==
- (in Polish) Polish Olympic Committee
- (in English) sports-reference
