= Andriy Klochko =

Ukrainian politician

- Андрій Клочко
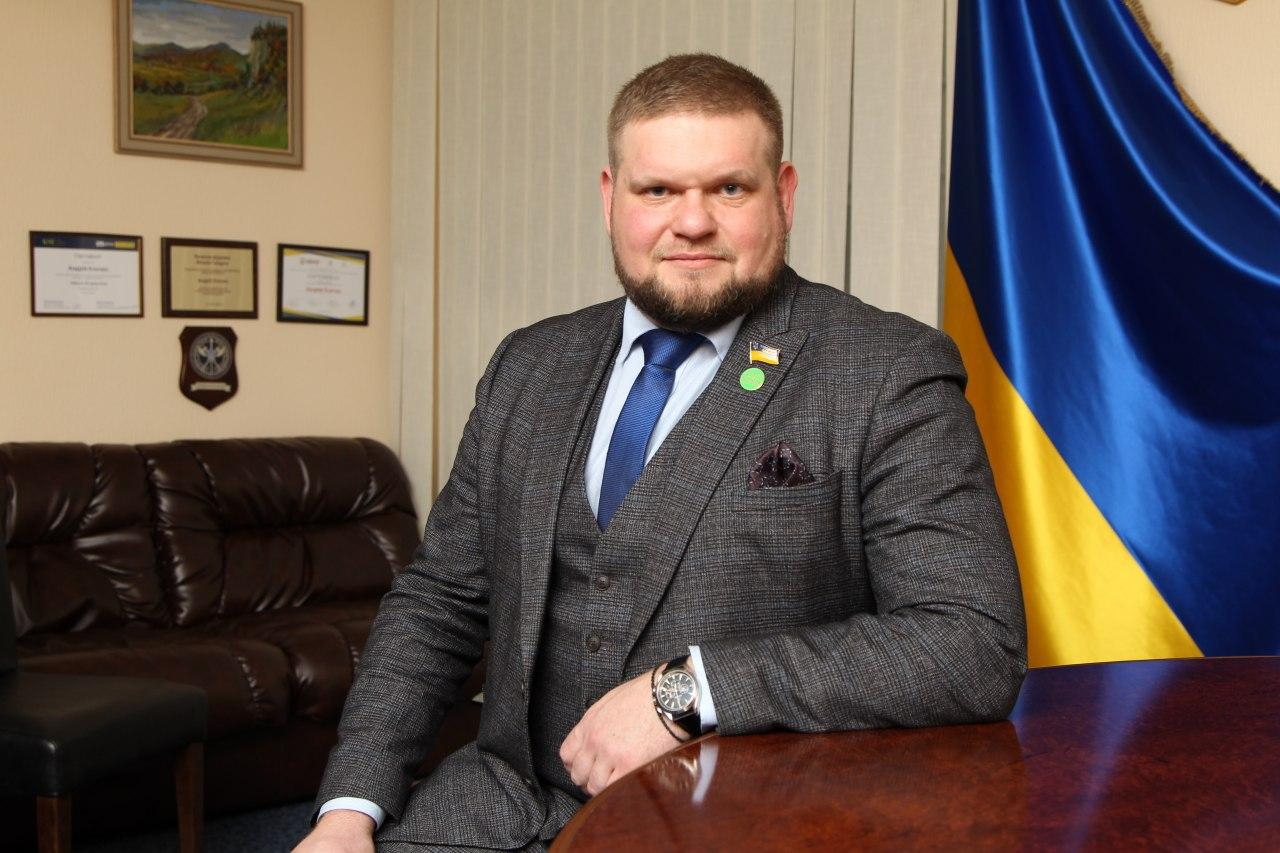

13th Chairman of the Verkhovna Rada

Chairman of the Verkhovna Rada Committee on the Organization of State Power, Local Self-Government, Regional Development and Urban Planning

Personal details
- Born: 16 March 1981 (age 45)
- Party: Servant of the people
- Children: 2
- Education: Higher

Andriy Andriyovych Klochko (born March 16, 1981, in Kyiv) is a Ukrainian politician and public figure. He served as a People's deputy of the Verkhovna Rada of Ukraine of the IX convocation, elected on the list of the "Servant of the People" party (Number 83 in the list), and is a member of the party "Servant of the People".

Klochko served as chairman of the Verkhovna Rada Committee on the Organization of State Power, Local Self-Government, Regional and Urban Development, is a deputy member of the permanent delegation to the NATO Parliamentary Assembly and a member of the board of the Construction Chamber of Ukraine.

== Education ==
From 1998 to 2004 Klochko studied at the faculty of electronics in the National Technical University "Kyiv Polytechnic Institute" where he received the qualification of "electronics engineer" majoring in physical and biomedical electronics. From 2003 to 2005 he studied at the Faculty of Corporate Economics of the Ukrainian Academy of Management and Business where he received the qualification of "Economics Specialist".

In 2003, he underwent military training at the Military Institute of Telecommunications and Informatization and was graduated in the military rank of second lieutenant.

In 2010, he graduated with honors from the International Institute of Management (Kyiv) and received a master's degree in business administration (MBA).

Since September 2017 Klochko is a graduate student of the National Academy of Public Administration under the President of Ukraine.

2019 he became a graduate student of Ivan Franko National University of Lviv.

== Career ==
Klochko has been engaged in business activities (production and sales) in wholesale and retail trade in book products.

2008–2011 headed the sales department of media holding "Hlavred-media." 2009–2013 he headed the book project "Chytaika".

In 2013–2018 he occupied a number of management positions in the field of processing and distribution of agricultural products in Ukraine and abroad.

Before his election to the parliament, he was assistant vice-rector and leading specialist of the international relations department at the Kyiv National University of Construction and Architecture.

He was one of the founders of the trading houses "Intelfert Ukraine" and "Rainbow Ukraine". He resigned as a founding member after being elected as people's deputy of Ukraine.

== Politics ==
In 2014, ran for the Verkhovna Rada in the 217th constituency (Kyiv's Obolon district).

In 2015 – ran to the Kyiv City Council (Dnipro district).

In 2019 – No.83 passed to parliament on the list of the party "Servant of the People" in the early elections to the Verkhovna Rada.

As a member of the Verkhovna Rada of the IX convocation, he is the chairman of the Verkhovna Rada committee on the organization of state power, local self-government, regional and urban development. He initiated more than 120 bills.

Andriy Klochko is a deputy member of the Permanent Delegation to the NATO Parliamentary Assembly, co-chair of the group for inter-parliamentary relations with the Republic of Finland, Secretary of the Group for Inter-Parliamentary Relations with the Republic of Korea and deputy co-chair of the group for inter-parliamentary relations with Japan.

He is a member of the inter-parliamentary relations groups with Australia, the State of Qatar, Sweden, Norway, United Kingdom of Great Britain and Northern Ireland. Furthermore, he is the head of the subcommittee on state architectural and construction control and supervision, licensing and insurance in construction.

== Social activities ==
Andriy Klochko is the Vice President of the All-Ukrainian Federation of Petanque, Chairman of the Judicial Committee of the Federation and a co-founder of the School of Political Leaders.

Also, he is former head of the public organization "Kolo".

== Private life ==
He is married with two children, a son, Adrian, and a daughter, Evelina.
