= Ana Gutiérrez (runner) =

United States Virgin Islands athlete

Personal information
- Nationality: American Virgin Islander
- Born: September 18, 1961 (age 64)

Sport
- Sport: Long-distance running
- Event: Marathon

Ana Gutiérrez (born September 18, 1961) is a long-distance runner who represents the United States Virgin Islands. She competed in the women's marathon at the 1992 Summer Olympics.
