= Cleveland Marathon =

Annual marathon in Cleveland, Ohio

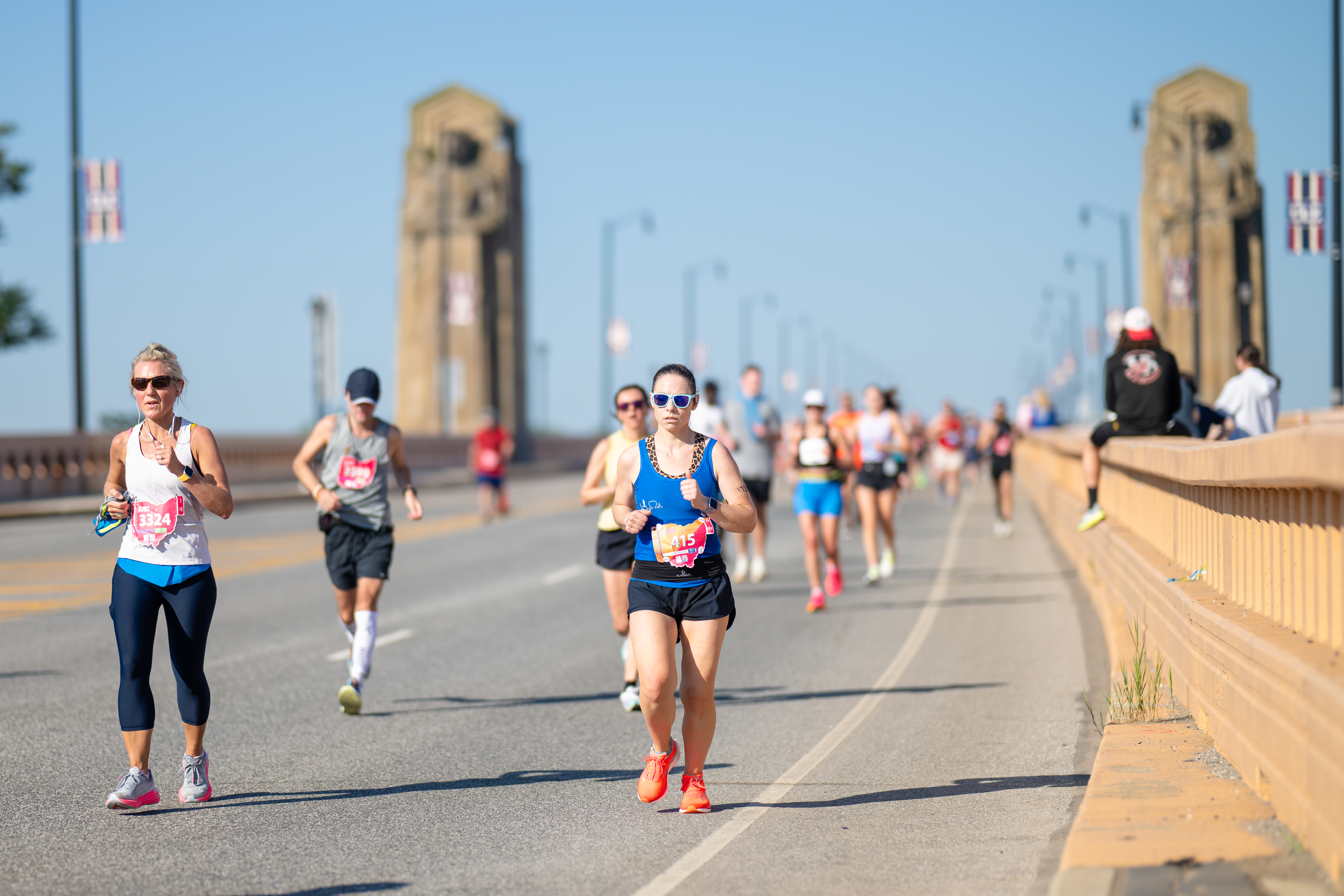
- Participants in the 2024 race
- Date: May
- Location: Cleveland, Ohio
- Event type: Road
- Distance: Marathon
- Primary sponsor: University Hospitals Cleveland Medical Center
- Established: 1976
- Organizer: Cleveland Marathon, Inc.
- Course records: Men: 2:10:29 (2000); Pavel Kokin; Women: 2:30:15 (1998); Tatyana Pozdnyakova
- Website: http://www.clevelandmarathon.com/

The Cleveland Marathon is an annual marathon in Cleveland, Ohio. The 26.2-mile (42.2 km) course begins at the corner of St. Clair and 9th and participants have eight hours to finish the race. One of the 50 oldest marathons in America, the first edition was held in 1978. A half marathon, and 10K, including a Corporate Team Challenge, are held concurrently with the full marathon. A 5K race is held on the day before the marathon race day. Cleveland Marathon events are operated by Cleveland Marathon, Inc., a private for-profit company.

At the finish line of the marathon, half marathon, and 10K the 26.3-mile (42.3 km) Rock Party is held. This party includes live entertainment, food vendors, and a beer garden.

The first prize in the Marathon event is $2,000. Among the charities supported by the marathon are The Leukemia & Lymphoma Society and the Cystic Fibrosis Foundation.

In 2013 and 2014 Sarah Kiptoo had back-to-back victories, joining Pablo Vigil ('80, '81 and later in '88), Demetrio Cabanillas ('83-85), Lyubov Klochko ('92-94), and Don Janicki ('93-94, right after finishing close to Driss Dacha in 1991), as consecutive winners.

The 2020 edition of the race was cancelled due to the coronavirus pandemic, with all registrants having the option to run the race virtually or transfer their registration to either 2021 or 2022.

== Winners ==
Key:

Course record (in bold)

Cleveland Marathon Champions

Ed.	Date	Men's winner	Time	Women's winner	Time
1	5/14/1978	Tom Fleming (USA)	2:15:02	Jacqueline Hansen (USA)	2:46:59
2	5/20/1979	Don Howieson (CAN)	2:17:06	Margret Copeland (CAN)	3:06:40
3	5/18/1980	Pablo Vigil (USA)	2:15:19	Linda Donkelaar (USA)	2:51:27
4	5/24/1981	Pablo Vigil (USA)	2:16:21	Jane Wipf (USA)	2:40:42
5	5/16/1982	Tony Sandoval (USA)	2:14:36	Kitty Consolo (USA)	2:50:47
6	5/15/1983	Demetrio Cabanallis (MEX)	2:17:17	Marcy Schwarm (USA)	2:48:41
7	5/20/1984	Demetrio Cabanallis (MEX)	2:16:13	Maria del Carmen Cardenas (MEX)	2:41:13
8	5/19/1985	Demetrio Cabanallis (MEX)	2:18:57	Kitty Consolo (USA)	2:49:13
9	5/18/1986	Ted Rupe (USA)	2:23:04	Jane Buch (USA)	2:54:53
10	5/17/1987	Jose-Joao da Silva (BRA)	2:19:18	Georgenna Havilland (USA)	2:55:23
11	5/15/1988	Pablo Vigil (USA)	2:19:59	Gloria Ramirez (MEX)	2:41:57
12	5/21/1989	Eddy Hellebuyck (BEL)	2:14:23	Irina Bogacheva (KGZ)	2:35:55
13	5/20/1990	Filemon Lopez (MEX)	2:15:12	Valentina Lunyegova (RUS)	2:44:23
14	5/19/1991	Paul Kipkoech (KEN)	2:14:26	Alevtina Naumova (RUS)	2:35:32
15	5/17/1992	Driss Dacha (MAR)	2:14:40	Lyubov Klochko (UKR)	2:35:11
16	5/16/1993	Don Janicki (USA)	2:11:39	Lyubov Klochko (UKR)	2:34:47
17	5/15/1994	Don Janicki (USA)	2:15:04	Lyubov Klochko (UKR)	2:26:13
18	5/14/1995	Boniface Merande (KEN)	2:15:31	Tatyana Titova (RUS)	2:39:25
19	5/5/1996	Hector DeJesus (MEX)	2:12:10	Alevtina Naumova (RUS)	2:32:14
20	5/4/1997	Samson Maritim (KEN)	2:11:58	Tatyana Pozdniakova (UKR)	2:33:27
21	5/3/1998	Joseph Kahugu (KEN)	2:11:30	Tatyana Pozdniakova (UKR)	2:30:15
22	5/2/1999	Vladimir Epanov (RUS)	2:12:22	Firiya Sultanova (RUS)	2:32:38
23	4/30/2000	Pavel Kokin (RUS)	2:10:29	Wioletta Kryza (POL)	2:34:27
24	4/29/2001	Edilson da Silva (BRA)	2:12:43	Elvira Kolpakova (RUS)	2:42:06
25	4/28/2002	Andrzej Krzyscin (POL)	2:19:06	Larisa Zyusko (RUS)	2:37:43
26	4/27/2003	Richard Roberts (USA)	2:28:59	Lourdes Cruz (PUR)	2:48:48
27	4/25/2004	Aleksandr Belavin (RUS)	2:24:02	Yolanda Mercado (PUR)	2:53:28
28	5/22/2005	Fred Kieser (USA)	2:22:00	Donna Palisca (USA)	2:54:53
29	5/21/2006	Eric Hartman (USA)	2:27:25	Megan Burns (USA)	2:50:24
30	5/20/2007	Brian McNeil (USA)	2:31:06	Claudia Colita (ROM)	2:48:41
31	5/18/2008	Retta Feyissa (ETH)	2:33:34	Donna Palisca (USA)	3:07:27
32	5/17/2009	Joel Stansloski (USA)	2:27:37	Jackie Bumgartner (USA)	2:57:49
34	5/16/2010	Brandon Bauer (USA)	2:27:10	Nicole Camp (USA)	2:55:38
35	5/15/2011	RP White (USA)	2:26:59	Nicole Camp (USA)	2:23:27
36	5/20/2012	Abraham Kogo (KEN)	2:19:59	Mary Akor (USA)	2:39:49
37	5/19/2013	Philemon Terer (KEN)	2:17:36	Sara Kiptoo (KEN)	2:33:41
38	5/18/2014	Phillip Lagat (KEN)	2:12:39	Sara Kiptoo (KEN)	2:34:58
39	5/17/15	Abraham Chelanga (KEN)	2:16:20	Tatyana Aryasova (RUS)	2:35:48
40	5/15/2016	Philemon Terer (KEN)	2:18:42	Hirut Beyene (ETH)	2:40:33
41	5/21/2017	Tisia Kiplangat (KEN)	2:20:25	Serkalem Biset (KEN)	2:42:08
42	5/20/2018	Daniel Mesfun (USA)	2:16:32	Sarah Horbol (USA)	2:51:36
43	5/19/2019	Edwin Kimaiyo (KEN)	2:22:04	Margaret Njuguna (USA)	2:45:31
—	—	not held in 2020 due to coronavirus pandemic			
44	10/23/2021	Jeremiah Fitzgerald (USA)	2:25:52	Ana Maria Villegas (USA)	2:48:58
45	5/21/2022	Jeremiah Fitzgerald (USA)	2:31:03	Ashton Swinford (USA)	2:46:46
46	5/21/2023	Will Loevner (USA)	2:19:26	Ashton Swinford (USA)	2:47:37
47	5/21/23	Will Loevner (USA)	2:19:44	Ashton Swinford (USA)	2:51:16
