= Marco Gozzano =

Italian long-distance runner

Personal information
- Nationality: Italian
- Born: 26 September 1963 (age 62)

Sport
- Country: Italy
- Sport: Athletics
- Events: Long-distance running Marathon

Achievements and titles
- Personal best: Marathon: 2:12:24 (1993)
Medal record
World Marathon Cup
Gold medal – first place	1995 Athens	Team

Marco Gozzano (born 26 September 1963) is a former Italian male long-distance runner who competed at five editions of the IAAF World Cross Country Championships at senior level (from 1984 to 1988).
