= Antonella Bizioli =

Italian long-distance runner

Personal information
- Full name: Antonella Luigina Bizioli
- Nationality: Italian
- Born: 29 March 1957 (age 69) Villa d'Ogna, Italy
- Height: 1.60 m (5 ft 3 in)
- Weight: 50 kg (110 lb)

Sport
- Country: Italy
- Sport: Athletics
- Event: Marathon
- Club: Snam Gas Metano
- Coached by: Claudio Valisa

Achievements and titles
- Personal best: Marathon: 2:31.21 (1988)
Medal record
World Marathon Cup
Silver medal – second place	1991 London	Team marathon
Bronze medal – third place	1995 Athens	Team marathon
International Marathons
Event / 1st / 2nd / 3rd; Venice Marathon / 1 / 0 / 0

Antonella Luigina Bizioli (born 29 March 1957 in Villa d'Ogna) is a former Italian long-distance runner who specialized in the marathon race.

She won two medals, with national team, at the World Marathon Cup.

== Biography ==
She participated at one editions of the Summer Olympics (1988) and one of the IAAF World Championships in Athletics (1987).

== Achievements ==
Year	Competition	Venue	Position	Event	Performance	Note
1987	World Championships	(Italy) Rome	12th	Marathon	2:38:52	
1988	Olympic Games	(South Korea) Seoul	23rd	Marathon	2:34:38	

== See also ==
- Italy at the 1988 Summer Olympics
