= Birhan Dagne =

Ethiopian-British female long-distance runner

Personal information
- Nationality: British/Ethiopian
- Born: 8 April 1978 (age 47) Ethiopia

Sport
- Sport: Athletics
- Event: long-distance
- Club: Woodford Green with Essex Ladies; Belgrave Harriers

Birhan Dagne (born 8 April 1978) is an Ethiopian-born, British former long-distance runner.

== Biography ==
Dagne was born, and grew up, in Ethiopia. She was a promising international athlete and in 1994 represented her country of birth; at the IAAF World Road Relay Championships, in both 3000m and 10000m at the World Junior Championships in Athletics, IAAF World Cross Country Championships and African Junior Athletics Championships.

At the age of 17 she was assaulted by a soldier because she was one of the minority Amhara ethnic group, while the ruling party in Ethiopia was Tigrayan. Later that year she flew to the UK as part of the Ethiopian junior cross country team for the 1995 IAAF World Cross Country Championships. Birhan finished fifth in the race and along with Alemitu Bekele(7th), Yemenashu Taye(8th) and Ayelech Worku(11th) took the silver medal in the team event. Early the following morning Dagne took a train to London, with fellow athletes Askale Bireda and Getenesh Tamirat, to seek political asylum. The UK Government refused asylum to the athletes, but Dagne and Bireda successfully appealed against this decision.

During this time the asylum seeking Ethiopian athletes trained at the Woodford Green with Essex Ladies athletic club. The IAAF approved her changes of allegiance on 1 December 1998 and soon after represented Great Britain at the 1999 IAAF World Cross Country Championships. She also finished second behind Hayley Haining in the 5,000 metres event at the 1999 AAA Championships and won the AAA title at the 2000 AAA Championships.

Dagne became a member of the London-based Belgrave Harriers athletics club and ran in many domestic Half-Marathon and Marathon races. In 2004 Dagne finished less than a minute behind the first Briton, a relatively unknown, Tracey Morris in the London Marathon. This performance meant she just missed out on a trip to the 2004 Olympic Games.

== International Competition ==
Year	Competition	Venue	Position	Event	Notes
Representing Ethiopia
1994	1994 World Junior Championships in Athletics	Lisbon, Portugal	9th	3000m	9:20.51
1994	1994 World Junior Championships in Athletics	Lisbon, Portugal	5th	10000m	34:13.58
1994	1994 IAAF World Cross Country Championships Juniors	Budapest, Hungary	10th	4.3 km	14:48
1994	1994 African Junior Athletics Championships	Algiers, Algeria	3rd	3000m	9:10.47
1994	1994 African Junior Athletics Championships	Algiers, Algeria	1st	10000m	33:49.10
1995	1995 IAAF World Cross Country Championships Juniors	Durham, UK	5th	4.47 km	14:25
Representing Great Britain
1999	1999 IAAF World Cross Country Championships	Belfast, UK	61st	8.012 km	30:55
1999	1999 European Athletics U23 Championships	Gothenburg, Sweden	9th	10000m	34:24.70
1999	1999 IAAF World Half Marathon Championships	Palermo, Italy	29th	Half Marathon	1:13:41
2001	2001 IAAF World Half Marathon Championships	Bristol, UK		Half Marathon	DNF

== Other Races ==
Year	Competition	Venue	Position	Event	Notes
1998	Hastings Half Marathon	Hastings, UK	1st	Half Marathon	1:16:30
1998	Blaydon Race	Newcastle upon Tyne, UK	1st	5.9miles	31:18
1999	Blaydon Race	Newcastle upon Tyne, UK	1st	5.9miles	31:04
2000	Blaydon Race	Newcastle upon Tyne, UK	1st	5.9miles	31:18
2000	Reading Half Marathon	Reading, UK	1st	Half Marathon	1:14:23
2004	Silverstone Half Marathon	Silverstone, UK	1st	Half Marathon	1:15:54
2004	City of Norwich Half Marathon	Norwich, UK	1st	Half Marathon	1:19:14
2004	London Marathon	London, UK	11th	Marathon	2:34:45
2005	Silverstone Half Marathon	Silverstone, UK	1st	Half Marathon	1:16:25
2005	Great Bristol Half Marathon	Bristol, UK	1st	Half Marathon	1:12:53
2006	City of Norwich Half Marathon	Norwich, UK	1st	Half Marathon	1:17:18
2006	Hastings Half Marathon	Hastings, UK	1st	Half Marathon	1:15:50
2006	Windsor Half Marathon	Windsor, UK	1st	Half Marathon	1:15:10
2006	Liverpool Half Marathon	Liverpool, UK	1st	Half Marathon	1:15:01
2006	London Marathon	London, UK	18th	Marathon	2:49:48
2007	Hastings Half Marathon	Hastings, UK	1st	Half Marathon	1:16:02
2008	Great Bristol Half Marathon	Bristol, UK	1st	Half Marathon	1:14:18
2008	Run to the Beat	London, UK	1st	Half Marathon	1:18:22
2008	Great Birmingham Run	Birmingham, UK	1st	Half Marathon	1:17:40
