= Sonia Samuels =

British long-distance runner

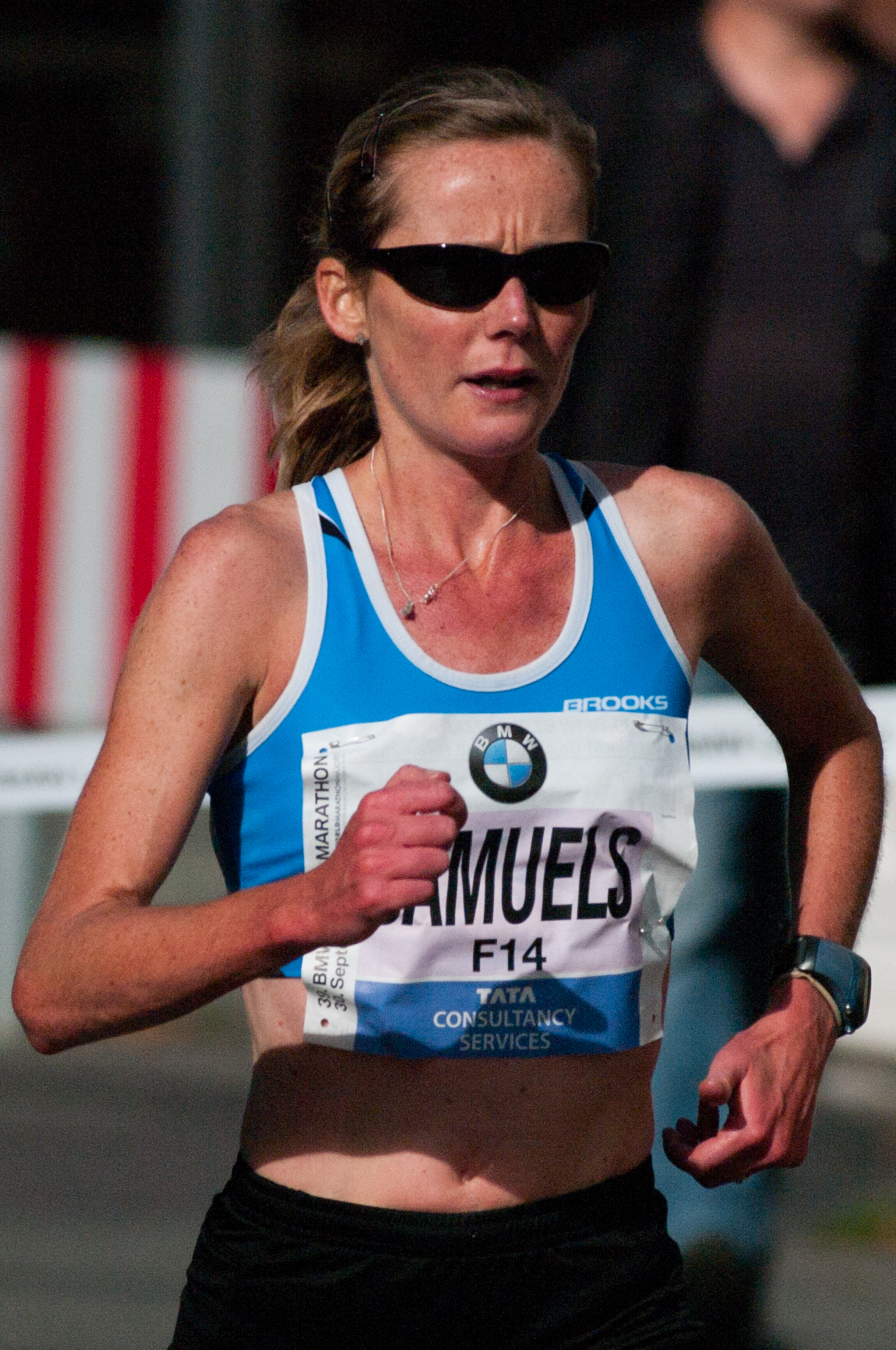
- Sonia Samuels at the 2012 Berlin Marathon

Personal information
- Born: 16 May 1979 (age 46) North Shields, England
- Height: 1.62 m (5 ft 4 in)
- Weight: 47 kg (104 lb)

Sport
- Country: Great Britain
- Sport: Track and field
- Event: Marathon

Sonia Samuels (born 16 May 1979) is a British long-distance runner. She competed in the marathon event at the 2013 World Championships in Athletics in Moscow, Russia. Samuels finished in seventh place at the 2017 Berlin Marathon with a time of 2:29:34.
