= Ramilya Burangulova =

Russian marathon runner

Ramilya Munavarovna Burangulova (Russian: Рамиля Мунаваровна Бурангулова, born July 11, 1961) is a Russian marathon runner. She was born in Kandry-Kutuy, Bashkir Autonomous Soviet Socialist Republic.

== Achievements ==
- All results regarding marathon, unless stated otherwise

Year	Competition	Venue	Position	Notes
Representing Soviet Union
1991	World Championships	Tokyo, Japan	8th	2:33:00
Representing Unified Team
1992	Olympic Games	Barcelona, Spain	8th	2:38:46
Representing Russia
1993	World Championships	Stuttgart, Germany	4th	2:33:03
1994	European Championships	Helsinki, Finland	25th	2:41.15
1996	Olympic Games	Atlanta, United States	35th	2:38:04
1996	Honolulu Marathon	Honolulu, Hawaii	1st	2:34:28
2000	Dubai Marathon	Dubai, United Arab Emirates	1st	2:40:22
2001	Dubai Marathon	Dubai, United Arab Emirates	1st	2:37:07
2004	Baltimore Marathon	Baltimore, United States	1st	2:40:21
2005	Baltimore Marathon	Baltimore, United States	1st	2:42:00
2007	Los Angeles Marathon	Los Angeles, United States	1st	2:37:54

=== Personal bests ===
- 5000 metres - 16:00.66 min (1995)
- Half marathon - 1:10:14 hrs
- Marathon - 2:28:03 hrs (1993)
