= Carlos Tarazona =

Venezuelan long-distance runner

Personal information
- Born: August 14, 1965 (age 60)

Sport
- Sport: Track and field

Carlos Emilio Tarazona (born August 14, 1965) is a retired male long-distance runner from Venezuela. He competed for his native South American country at two consecutive Summer Olympics, starting in 1996. Tarazona set his personal best in the men's marathon on April 30, 2000 in Cleveland, United States, clocking 2:11.25.

== Achievements ==
Year	Competition	Venue	Position	Event	Notes
Representing Venezuela
1996	Olympic Games	Atlanta, United States	89th	Marathon	2:32:35
1998	Central American and Caribbean Games	Maracaibo, Venezuela	6th	Marathon	2:32:40
2000	Olympic Games	Sydney, Australia	40th	Marathon	2:20:39
