= Kandry-Kutuy =

Kandry-Kutuy Кандры-Кутуй
- Selo
- Location within Bashkortostan Location within Russia
- Coordinates: 54°30′N 54°05′E
- Country: Russia
- Region: Bashkortostan
- District: Tuymazinsky District
- Time zone: UTC+5:00

Kandry-Kutuy (Russian: Кандры-Кутуй; Bashkir: Ҡандра-Ҡотой, Qandra-Qotoy) is a rural locality (a selo) in Kandrinsky Selsoviet, Tuymazinsky District, Bashkortostan, Russia. The population was 651 as of 2010. There are 12 streets.

== Geography ==
Kandry-Kutuy is located 37 km southeast of Tuymazy (the district's administrative centre) by road. Starye Kandry is the nearest rural locality.
