= Zhao Youfeng =

Chinese long-distance runner

Zhao Youfeng (simplified Chinese: 赵友凤; traditional Chinese: 趙友鳳; pinyin: Zhào Yǒufèng; born May 5, 1965) is a former long-distance runner from PR China. She represented her native country at the 1988 Summer Olympics in Seoul, South Korea, finishing in 5th place. She set her personal best in the same year, clocking 2:27:06.

== Achievements ==
- All results regarding marathon, unless stated otherwise

Year	Competition	Venue	Position	Notes
Representing China
1988	Nagoya Marathon	Nagoya, Japan	1st	2:27:56
1988	Olympic Games	Seoul, South Korea	5th	2:27:06
1989	Nagoya Marathon	Nagoya, Japan	1st	2:28:20
1990	Asian Games	Beijing, PR China	1st	2:35:19
