= Sissel Grottenberg =

Norwegian long-distance runner

Sissel Sofie Grottenberg (born 17 August 1956 in Sarpsborg, Østfold) is a retired Norwegian long-distance runner who specialized in the marathon race and half marathon.

In the marathon she finished 36th at the 1988 Summer Olympics, seventh at the 1990 European Championships and sixteenth at the 1991 World Championships. She became Norwegian champion in half marathon in the years 1989-1992. In addition she won the 1500 m in 1988 and in 5000 m in 2000.

== Personal bests ==
- 5000 metres - 16:08.41 min (1986)
- 10,000 metres - 32:54.84 min (1987) - eighth among Norwegian 10,000 m runners.
- Half marathon - 1:11:46 hrs (1988) - seventh among Norwegian half marathon runners.
- Marathon - 2:32:57 hrs (1987) - sixth among Norwegian marathon runners.

== Achievements ==
- All results regarding marathon, unless stated otherwise

Year	Competition	Venue	Position	Notes
Representing Norway
1981	Boston Marathon	Boston, United States	6th	2:33:03
1981	New York City Marathon	New York, United States	14th	2:45:04
1988	Olympic Games	Seoul, South Korea	36th	2:38:17
1990	European Championships	Split, FR Yugoslavia	7th	2:39.04
1991	World Championships	Tokyo, Japan	16th	2:43:11
1993	Frankfurt Marathon	Frankfurt, Germany	1st	2:36:50
1994	Vienna Marathon	Vienna, Austria	1st	2:36:17
