= Sally Ellis =

English runner

Sally Ellis née McDiarmid
Personal information
- Nationality: British (English)
- Born: 17 May 1958 (age 68) Lyndhurst, England
- Height: 1.63 m (5 ft 4 in)
- Weight: 50 kg (110 lb) (1992)

Sport
- Sport: Athletics
- Events: Marathon, Half marathon
- Club: Birchfield Harriers

Sally Ellis née McDiarmid (born 17 May 1958) is a female English retired long-distance road and cross-country runner who competed in the Marathon for Great Britain at the 1992 Summer Olympics.

== Biography ==
McDiarmid finished third behind Paula Fudge in the 5,000 metres event at the 1983 WAAA Championships.

McDiarmid married David Ellis in Hampshire during 1985 and competed under her married name thereafter. AS Ellis, she finished second and third behind Sue Crehan and Monica Joyce respectively at the 1985 WAAA Championships.

Ellis represented England in marathon event, at the 1990 Commonwealth Games in Auckland, New Zealand and shortly afterwards became the British 5,000 metres champion after winning the AAA Championship title at the 1990 AAA Championships.

Ellis then competed at the 1991 World Championships in Athletics before representing Great Britain at the 1992 Olympic Games in Barcelona.

Ellis represented England again, at the 1994 Commonwealth Games in Victoria, British Columbia, Canada.

She was a member of Birchfield Harriers and founded a running and fitness group in Sutton Coldfield.

== Competition Record ==
Year	Competition	Venue	Position	Event	Notes
Representing United Kingdom
1983	Stroud Half Marathon	Stroud, United Kingdom	1st	Half Marathon	Unknown
1987	IAAF World Cross Country Championships	Warsaw, Poland	30th	Cross Country 5.05 km	17:38
1987	City of Norwich Half Marathon	Norwich, United Kingdom	1st	Half Marathon	1:16:48
1988	Bath Half Marathon	Bath, United Kingdom	1st	Half Marathon	1:11.38 PB
1989	IAAF World Cross Country Championships	Stavanger, Norway	62nd	Cross Country 6 km	24:16
1989	London Marathon	London, United Kingdom	12th	Marathon	2:33:24 PB
1991	IAAF World Cross Country Championships	Antwerp, Belgium	72nd	Cross Country 6.425 km	22:03
1991	World Championships in Athletics	Tokyo, Japan	10th	Marathon	2:35:09
1992	Olympic Games	Barcelona, Spain	27th	Marathon	2:54:41
1994	London Marathon	London, United Kingdom	4th	Marathon	2:37:06
