= Don Janicki =

American long-distance runner

Personal information
- Born: April 23, 1960 (age 66) Mesa, Arizona, United States

Sport
- Sport: Track and field

Don Janicki (born April 23, 1960) is an American long-distance runner.

As a student at Mesa High School (Mesa, Arizona) in 1978, Janicki set the state high school record for the mile with a time of 4:09.95. The record would remain 35 years until Andy Trouard of Salpointe ran a 4:09.71. He later competed for the Arizona Wildcats and earn All-American honors in 1980 and 1981 in cross country. During his 1982 track season, Janicki ran the 5,000 meters in 13:44.20 and the 10,000 meters in 28:27.87, putting him in the top 10 fastest University of Arizona runners in each event.

In 1987, won the Holiday Bowl Marathon in San Diego, California. He drove away from the race with $4,000 in prize money and a new convertible. The 1989 year took him to Minneapolis and St. Paul for the Twin Cities Marathon, which he won in a time of 2:12:18, earning him $25,000.

Janicki ran his fastest marathon time in 1985 in the Chicago Marathon, which fielded strong competition with world-class finishing times. Janicki's PR of 2:11:16 put him in seventh, four minutes behind British runner Steve Jones, who was hoping to set a second consecutive world record that morning. While Jones did take the win in 2:07:13, a minute faster than his previous world record the year before, it wasn't fast enough to beat Carlos Lopes's 2:07:12 set in April 1985. Janicki's time was the fourth-fastest marathon time by an American in 1985.

He won the Cleveland Marathon in 1993 and 1994 with times of 2:11:39 and 2:15:04 respectively.

He was back in the top finishers at the 1994 Chicago Marathon with a fifth-place finish in 2:13:21.

In 2016, Janicki was inducted into the Colorado Running Hall of Fame.
