= Françoise Bonnet =

French long-distance runner

Françoise Bonnet (born 8 April 1957 in Montluçon, Allier) is a retired female long-distance runner from France. She set her personal best (2:31:20) in the marathon in 1990.

== Achievements ==
Year	Competition	Venue	Position	Event	Notes
Representing France
1988	Olympic Games	Seoul, South Korea	14th	Marathon	2:32:36
1990	European Championships	Split, SFR Yugoslavia	6th	Marathon	2:37.55
1991	World Championships	Tokyo, Japan	20th	Marathon	2:48:57
1994	European Championships	Helsinki, Finland	34th	Marathon	2:49.00
