= Maria Rebelo =

French long-distance runner

Personal information
- Nationality: French
- Born: 29 January 1956 (age 70) Ilhavo
- Years active: 1990s

Sport
- Event: Marathon
Medal record
Women's athletics
Representing France
European Championships
Bronze medal – third place	1990 Split	Marathon

Maria Rebelo (divorced Rebelo-Lelut; born 29 January 1956 in Ílhavo, Baixo Vouga, Portugal) is a retired female long-distance runner from France. She set her personal best of 2:29:04 hours in the marathon in 1991.

Rebelo rose to prominence in the 1986 season by winning the Paris Marathon in the time of 2:32:16. Winner of her first national marathon title in 1990, Maria Rebelo took third at the 1990 European Championships at Split, finishing behind the Portuguese Rosa Mota and the Soviet Valentina Yegorova. She ran the best performance of her career on 21 April 1991 by completing the London Marathon in 2:29:04, then she placed fifth at the 1991 World Championships at Tokyo in 2:32:05. Selected to run at the 1992 Olympic Games, Rebelo did not finish. She won two more French national marathon championships in 1993 and 1994.

== International competitions ==
Year	Competition	Venue	Position	Event	Notes
Representing France
1986	European Championships	Stuttgart, West Germany	9th	Marathon	2:40:20
1987	World Championships	Rome, Italy	—	Marathon	DNF
1988	Olympic Games	Seoul, South Korea	18th	Marathon	2:33:47
1990	European Championships	Split, SFR Yugoslavia	3rd	Marathon	2:35.51
1991	World Championships	Tokyo, Japan	5th	Marathon	2:32:05
1992	Olympic Games	Barcelona, Spain	—	Marathon	DNF
1993	World Championships	Stuttgart, Germany	12th	Marathon	2:38:33

== Road race wins ==
- Paris Marathon: 1986 (2:32:16)
- Paris Half Marathon: 1993 (1:13:02)
