= Nagoya Women's Marathon =

Annual marathon race

- Date: Mid-March
- Location: Nagoya, Japan
- Event type: Road
- Distance: Marathon
- Primary sponsor: Menard Cosmetic
- Established: 1980
- Course records: 2:17:18 (2022) (Kenya) Ruth Chepng'etich
- Website: Nagoya Women's Marathon
- Participants: 49 elite finishers (2022); 96 (2020); 119 (2019)

The Nagoya Women's Marathon (名古屋ウィメンズマラソン), named Nagoya International Women's Marathon (名古屋国際女子マラソン, Nagoya Kokusai Joshi Marathon) until the 2010 race, is an annual marathon race for female runners over the classic distance of 42.195 km, held in Nagoya, Japan in early March every year. It holds World Athletics Platinum road race status. It is held on the same day as the Nagoya City Marathon, an event consisting of a half marathon (21.0975 km) and a quarter marathon (10.5 km), with both races open to both men and women.

== History ==
It began in 1980 as an annual 20-kilometre road race held in Toyohashi, Aichi, Japan. After its first two years there, the venue changed to Nagoya for the third edition in 1982. It was converted to a marathon race for the 1984 edition, and a 10-kilometre race was also added to the race programme. The race acts as the Japanese women's marathon championships on three-year rotational basis. Performances at the race are typically taken into consideration when deciding the Japanese women's Olympic or World Championship teams. Nagoya has also twice hosted the women's Asian Marathon Championship race (1988 and 1994).

The 2011 race was cancelled due to the Tōhoku earthquake that March. In 2012 the race was held on a newly designed course and was opened to public, mass participation for the first time, and renamed the Nagoya Women's Marathon. Around 15,000 runners took part that year.

The 2020 edition of the race was restricted to elite runners only due to the coronavirus pandemic. No refunds or preferential entries to future editions were offered to general runners, but a virtual marathon was organized with commemorative items to be sent by mail to all finishers.

== Winners ==
Key: Course record Japanese championship race Asian Marathon Championship race

- Bolding indicates course record improvement

Edition	Date	Winner	Country	Time (h:m:s)
45	March 9, 2025	Sheila Chepkirui	Kenya	2:20:40
44	March 10, 2024	Yuka Ando	Japan	2:21:19
43	March 12, 2023	Ruth Chepng'etich	Kenya	2:18:08
42	March 13, 2022	Ruth Chepng'etich	Kenya	2:17:18
41	March 14, 2021	Mizuki Matsuda	Japan	2:21:51
40	March 8, 2020	Mao Ichiyama	Japan	2:20:29
39	March 10, 2019	Helalia Johannes	Namibia	2:22:25
38	March 11, 2018	Meskerem Assefa	Ethiopia	2:21:45
37	March 12, 2017	Eunice Kirwa	Bahrain	2:21:17
36	March 13, 2016	Eunice Kirwa	Bahrain	2:22:40
35	March 8, 2015	Eunice Kirwa	Bahrain	2:22:08
34	March 9, 2014	Jeļena Prokopčuka	Latvia	2:24:07
33	March 10, 2013	Ryoko Kizaki	Japan	2:23:34
32	March 11, 2012	Albina Mayorova	Russia	2:23:52
31	March 14, 2010	Yuri Kanō	Japan	2:27:11
30	March 8, 2009	Yoshiko Fujinaga	Japan	2:28:13
29	March 9, 2008	Yurika Nakamura	Japan	2:25:51
28	March 11, 2007	Yasuko Hashimoto	Japan	2:28:49
27	March 12, 2006	Harumi Hiroyama	Japan	2:23:26
26	March 13, 2005	Yumiko Hara	Japan	2:24:19
25	March 14, 2004	Reiko Tosa	Japan	2:23:57
24	March 9, 2003	Takami Ominami	Japan	2:25:03
23	March 10, 2002	Mizuki Noguchi	Japan	2:25:35
22	March 11, 2001	Kazumi Matsuo	Japan	2:26:01
21	March 12, 2000	Naoko Takahashi	Japan	2:22:19
20	March 14, 1999	Lyubov Morgunova	Russia	2:27:43
19	March 8, 1998	Naoko Takahashi	Japan	2:25:48
18	March 12, 1997	Madina Biktagirova	Russia	2:29:30
17	March 10, 1996	Izumi Maki	Japan	2:27:32
16	March 12, 1995	Kamila Gradus	Poland	2:27:29
15	March 13, 1994	Eriko Asai	Japan	2:30:30
14	March 7, 1993	Kamila Gradus	Poland	2:27:38
13	March 1, 1992	Teruko Oe	Japan	2:31:04
12	March 3, 1991	Sachiko Yamashita	Japan	2:31:02
11	March 4, 1990	Wanda Panfil	Poland	2:31:04
10	March 5, 1989	Zhao Youfeng	China	2:28:20
9	March 6, 1988	Zhao Youfeng	China	2:27:56
8	March 1, 1987	Carla Beurskens	Netherlands	2:28:27
7	March 2, 1986	Katrin Dörre	East Germany	2:29:33
6	March 3, 1985	Nanae Sasaki	Japan	2:33:57
5	March 4, 1984	Glenys Quick	New Zealand	2:34:25
4	January 27, 1983	Ellen Hart	United States	1:08:58*
3	March 7, 1982	Cathie Twomey	United States	1:06:52*
2	March 8, 1981	Mie Tanaka	Japan	1:17:50*
1	March 9, 1980	Nanae Sasaki	Japan	1:16:10*

- NB: (*) Asterisks indicate results of 20-kilometre road races
