= Lyubov Klochko =

Ukrainian long-distance runner

Lyubov Klochko or Liubov Klochko (Ukrainian: Любов Клочко; born 26 September 1959) is a retired female long-distance runner from Ukraine. She set her personal best time (2:26:13) in the women's marathon in 1994, a performance which was also her third victory in a row in Cleveland.

== Achievements ==
Year	Competition	Venue	Position	Event	Notes
Representing Soviet Union
1989	London Marathon	London, England	23rd	Marathon	2:38:22
1989	Tokyo Marathon	Tokyo, Japan	1st	Marathon	2:31:33
1990	London Marathon	London, England	13th	Marathon	2:32:08
1990	European Championships	Split, SFR Yugoslavia	—	Marathon	DNF
1991	Tokyo Marathon	Tokyo, Japan	3rd	Marathon	2:32:28
1991	Berlin Marathon	Berlin, Germany	6th	Marathon	2:31:44
Representing Ukraine
1992	Cleveland Marathon	Cleveland, United States	1st	Marathon	2:35:11
1992	Omsk Marathon	Omsk, Russia	2nd	Marathon	2:33:13
1992	Berlin Marathon	Berlin, Germany	4th	Marathon	2:32:13
1993	Cleveland Marathon	Cleveland, United States	1st	Marathon	2:34:47
1993	Los Angeles Marathon	Los Angeles, United States	1st	Marathon	2:39:48
1994	Cleveland Marathon	Cleveland, United States	1st	Marathon	2:26:13
1994	European Championships	Helsinki, Finland	—	Marathon	DNF
1994	Chicago Marathon	Chicago, United States	9th	Marathon	2:40:09
1995	Los Angeles Marathon	Los Angeles, United States	3rd	Marathon	2:33:31
1996	Los Angeles Marathon	Los Angeles, United States	1st	Marathon	2:30:30
1996	Olympic Games	Atlanta, United States	—	Marathon	DNF
1997	Detroit Free Press Marathon	Detroit, United States	1st	Marathon	2:39:59
