= Valentina Yegorova =

Russian long-distance runner

Medal record

Women's athletics

Representing Soviet Union

Olympic Games
Gold medal – first place	1992 Barcelona	Marathon
Silver medal – second place	1996 Atlanta	Marathon

World Half Marathon Championships
Gold medal – first place	1995 Montbéliard	Half marathon

European Championships
Silver medal – second place	1990 Split	Marathon

Valentina Mikhailovna Yegorova (Russian: Валентина Михайловна Егорова, born 16 February 1964) is a long-distance runner from Russia.

== Career ==
Yegorova was born in Cheboksary. Her first medal in the marathon came at the 1990 European Athletics Championships, where she was the silver medallist.

Yegorova competed in the women's marathon for the Unified Team at the 1992 Summer Olympics held in Barcelona, Spain. There she won the gold medal beating the Japanese athlete Yuko Arimori into second. She won a second global title at the 1995 IAAF World Half Marathon Championships.

She returned to compete for Russia in the 1996 Summer Olympics held in Atlanta, where she won the silver medal in the women's marathon, again beating Yuko Arimori this time into third. She made her final major appearance at the 2000 Sydney Olympics, where she failed to finish the Olympic marathon.

On the road circuit, Yegorova won the 1993 and 1994 editions of the Tokyo International Women's Marathon (times of 2:26:40 and 2:30:09) and she won the inaugural Nagano Olympic Commemorative Marathon in 1999 in 2:28:41. She placed eleventh at the 2001 Nagoya Marathon, with a finishing time of 2:28:40 hours.

== International competitions ==
Year	Competition	Venue	Position	Event	Notes
Representing the Soviet Union
1990	European Championships	Split, FR Yugoslavia	2nd	Marathon	2:31.32
1991	World Championships	Tokyo, Japan	—	Marathon	DNF
Representing the Unified Team
1992	Olympic Games	Barcelona, Spain	1st	Marathon	2:32:41
Representing Russia
1995	World Half Marathon Championships	Montbéliard, France	1st	Half marathon	1:09:58
1996	Olympic Games	Atlanta, United States	2nd	Marathon	2:28:05
2000	Olympic Games	Sydney, Australia	—	Marathon	DNF
