= Sally Eastall =

English long-distance runner

Personal information
- Nationality: British (English)
- Born: 5 January 1963 (age 63) Stowmarket, Suffolk, England
- Height: 161 cm (5 ft 3 in)
- Weight: 48 kg (106 lb)

Sport
- Sport: Athletics
- Event: long-distance
- Club: St. Edmunds Pacers

Sally Rose Eastall (born 5 January 1963) is an English former long-distance runner. She competed in the marathon at the 1992 Barcelona Olympics and at the 1991 World Championships in Tokyo. She ran her best time for the marathon of 2:29:29 when winning the 1991 California International Marathon.

== Biography ==
Born in Stowmarket, Suffolk, Eastall finished 11th at the 1991 World Championships in Tokyo. Three months later she ran her best-ever marathon time of 2:29:29 when winning the California International Marathon on 8 December 1991, to become only the eighth British woman to run a marathon in less than 2:30 (after Joyce Smith, Priscilla Welch, Sarah Rowell, Sally-Ann Hales, Veronique Marot, Paula Fudge and Liz McColgan). She went on to finish 13th at the 1992 Olympic Games.

She represented England in the marathon, at the 1994 Commonwealth Games in Victoria, British Columbia, Canada.

As of 2018, Eastall ranks 18th on the UK all-time list for the marathon.

Eastall is a vegan.

== International competitions ==
All results regarding the Marathon

Year	Competition	Venue	Position	Notes
Representing Great Britain / England
1990	European Championships	Split, SFR Yugoslavia	11th	2:41:37
1991	World Championships	Tokyo, Japan	11th	2:36:16
1992	Olympic Games	Barcelona, Spain	13th	2:41:20
1994	Commonwealth Games	Victoria, Canada	13th	2:41:32
Other marathons
1986	Taunton Marathon	Taunton, United Kingdom	1st	2:54:18 (430 metres short)
1986	London Marathon	London, United Kingdom	55th	2:59:23
1986	Montreal International Marathon	Montreal, Canada	5th	2:54:07
1988	London Marathon	London, United Kingdom	36th	2:54:16
1989	Košice Peace Marathon	Košice, Czechoslovakia	4th	2:41:06
1989	London Marathon	London, United Kingdom	29th	2:40:44
1990	Bermuda Marathon	Hamilton, Bermuda	1st	2:42:47
1990	London Marathon	London, United Kingdom	18th	2:34:31
1991	London Marathon	London, United Kingdom	26th	2:36:19
1991	California International Marathon	California, United States	1st	2:29:29
1992	Nagoya International Women's Marathon	Nagoya, Japan	5th	2:33:36
1992	New York City Marathon	New York, United States	7th	2:34:05
1994	London Marathon	London, United Kingdom	5th	2:37:08
1996	Houston Marathon	Houston, United States	12th	2:38:52
1996	London Marathon	London, United Kingdom	14th	2:38:59
1999	London Marathon	London, United Kingdom	20th	2:51:51
