= 1989 London Marathon =

9th London Marathon

9th London Marathon
- Venue: London, United Kingdom
- Date: 23 April 1989

Champions
- Men: Douglas Wakiihuri (2:09:03)
- Women: Véronique Marot (2:25:56)
- Wheelchair men: David Holding (1:59:31)
- Wheelchair women: Josie Cichockyj (3:03:54)

The 1989 London Marathon was the ninth running of the annual marathon race in London, United Kingdom, which took place on Sunday, 23 April. The elite men's race was won by Kenya's Douglas Wakiihuri in a time of 2:09:03 hours and the women's race was won by home athlete Véronique Marot in 2:25:56. Marot's time was a British national record, which stood for 13 years before Paula Radcliffe improved it with a world record at the 2002 London Marathon.

In the wheelchair races, British athletes David Holding (1:59:31) and Josie Cichockyj (3:03:54) won the men's and women's divisions, respectively. This was the first time an athlete completed the wheelchair marathon in under two hours.

Around 72,000 people applied to enter the race, of which 31,772 had their applications accepted and 24,452 started the race. A total of 22,701 runners finished the race.

== Results ==
=== Men ===
Position	Athlete	Nationality	Time
1st place, gold medalist(s)	Douglas Wakiihuri	Kenya	2:09:03
2nd place, silver medalist(s)	Steve Moneghetti	Australia	2:09:06
3rd place, bronze medalist(s)	Hussein Ahmed Salah	Djibouti	2:09:09
4	Manuel Matias	Portugal	2:09:43
5	Suleiman Nyambui	Tanzania	2:09:52
6	Tony Milovsorov	United Kingdom	2:09:54
7	Pat Petersen	United States	2:10:04
8	Wodajo Bulti	Ethiopia	2:10:32
9	Takao Nakamura	Japan	2:11:51
10	Zhang Guowei	China	2:12:03
11	Michael O'Reilly	United Kingdom	2:12:16
12	John Wheway	United Kingdom	2:12:22
13	Allister Hutton	United Kingdom	2:12:47
14	Tefera Guta	Ethiopia	2:12:49
15	Kenneth Stuart	United Kingdom	2:12:53
16	Jose Carlos da Silva	Brazil	2:12:57
17	Allan Zachariasen	Denmark	2:13:15
18	Peter Maher	Canada	2:13:25
19	Kevin Forster	United Kingdom	2:13:31
20	John Andrew Boyes	United Kingdom	2:13:45
21	Peter Dall	Denmark	2:14:25
22	Giuseppe Denti	Italy	2:14:29
23	Bjorn Sivertsen	Denmark	2:14:33
24	Igor Braslavskiy	Soviet Union	2:14:38
25	Yuri Porotov	Soviet Union	2:15:10

=== Women ===
Position	Athlete	Nationality	Time
1st place, gold medalist(s)	Véronique Marot	United Kingdom	2:25:56
2nd place, silver medalist(s)	Wanda Panfil	Poland	2:27:05
3rd place, bronze medalist(s)	Aurora Cunha	Portugal	2:28:11
4	Dorthe Rasmussen	Denmark	2:29:34
5	Raisa Smekhnova	Soviet Union	2:30:15
6	Evy Palm	Sweden	2:31:05
7	Angie Hulley	United Kingdom	2:31:06
8	Lynn Harding	United Kingdom	2:31:45
9	Charlotte Teske	West Germany	2:32:34
10	Conceição Ferreira	Portugal	2:32:50
11	Sheila Catford	United Kingdom	2:33:04
12	Sally Ellis	United Kingdom	2:33:24
13	Krystyna Chylińska	Poland	2:33:46
14	Jill Clarke Harrison	United Kingdom	2:34:19
15	Sissel Grottenberg	Norway	2:35:01
16	Sandra Branney	United Kingdom	2:35:03
17	Rosemary Ellis	United Kingdom	2:35:32
18	Marina Samy	United Kingdom	2:36:32
19	Maria Polyzou	Greece	2:37:03
20	Dominique Rembert	France	2:37:04
21	Małgorzata Birbach	Poland	2:37:08
22	Nicola Morris	United Kingdom	2:38:21
23	Lyubov Klochko	Soviet Union	2:38:22
24	Christine Kennedy	Ireland	2:39:13
25	Ewa Szydlowska	Poland	2:39:21

=== Wheelchair men ===
Position	Athlete	Nationality	Time
1st place, gold medalist(s)	David Holding	United Kingdom	1:59:31
2nd place, silver medalist(s)	Ted Vince	Canada	1:59:32
3rd place, bronze medalist(s)	Chris Hallam	United Kingdom	1:59:33
4	Scott Paterson	Canada	1:59:39
5	Lex de Turck	Netherlands	2:08:12
6	Andy Haynes	United Kingdom	2:09:55
7	Ian Thompson	United Kingdom	2:11:24
8	Ivan Newman	United Kingdom	2:16:30
9	Kevin Breen	Ireland	2:16:35
10	Kevin Doran	United Kingdom	2:22:04

=== Wheelchair women ===
Position	Athlete	Nationality	Time				
1st place, gold medalist(s)	Josie Cichockyj	United Kingdom	3:03:54				
—	Karen Davidson	United Kingdom	DNF	–	Karen Davidson	United Kingdom	DNF
