= 1988 London Marathon =

8th London Marathon

8th London Marathon
- Venue: London, United Kingdom
- Date: 17 April 1988

Champions
- Men: Henrik Jørgensen (2:10:20)
- Women: Ingrid Kristiansen (2:25:41)
- Wheelchair men: Ted Vince (2:01:37)
- Wheelchair women: Karen Davidson (2:41:45)

The 1988 London Marathon was the eighth running of the annual marathon race in London, United Kingdom, which took place on Sunday, 17 April. The elite men's race was won by Denmark's Henrik Jørgensen in a time of 2:10:20 hours and the women's race was won by Norway's Ingrid Kristiansen in 2:25:41.

In the wheelchair races, Canadian Ted Vince (2:01:37) and Britain's Karen Davidson (2:41:45) set course records in their wins of the men's and women's divisions, respectively. This was the first time a non-British athlete won one of wheelchair events.

Around 73,000 people applied to enter the race, of which 29,979 had their applications accepted and 22,469 started the race. A total of 20,932 runners finished the race – the first time the marathon had over 20,000 people achieve that.

== Results ==
=== Men ===
Position	Athlete	Nationality	Time
1st place, gold medalist(s)	Henrik Jørgensen	Denmark	2:10:20
2nd place, silver medalist(s)	Kevin Forster	United Kingdom	2:10:52
3rd place, bronze medalist(s)	Kazuyoshi Kudo	Japan	2:10:59
4	Hugh Jones	United Kingdom	2:11:08
5	Dave Long	United Kingdom	2:11:33
6	Allister Hutton	United Kingdom	2:11:42
7	Herbert Steffny	West Germany	2:11:54
8	Cai Shangyan	China	2:11:58
9	John Wheway	United Kingdom	2:12:13
10	Charlie Spedding	United Kingdom	2:12:28
11	Dominique Chauvelier	France	2:12:39
12	Steve Brace	United Kingdom	2:12:58
13	Gerhard Hartmann	Austria	2:13:33
14	Kenneth Stuart	United Kingdom	2:13:36
15	Jose Carlos da Silva	Brazil	2:13:42
16	Art Boileau	Canada	2:13:44
17	Dave Edge	Canada	2:14:10
18	Karl Harrison	United Kingdom	2:14:27
19	Mehmet Terzi	Turkey	2:14:51
20	Peter Lyrenmann	Switzerland	2:14:55

=== Women ===
Position	Athlete	Nationality	Time
1st place, gold medalist(s)	Ingrid Kristiansen	Norway	2:25:41
2nd place, silver medalist(s)	Ann Ford	United Kingdom	2:30:38
3rd place, bronze medalist(s)	Evy Palm	Sweden	2:31:35
4	Susan Wightman	United Kingdom	2:32:09
5	Susan Crehan	United Kingdom	2:35:10
6	Tove Lorentzen	Denmark	2:35:52
7	Jacqueline Gareau	Canada	2:36:04
8	Angie Hulley	United Kingdom	2:36:11
9	Rosemary Ellis	United Kingdom	2:37:10
10	Wang Qinghuan	China	2:37:42
11	Alison Gooderham	United Kingdom	2:37:49
12	Sheila Catford	United Kingdom	2:38:18
13	Dimitra Papaspirou	Greece	2:40:04
14	Anne Corneliussen	Norway	2:40:40
15	Oddrun Hovsengen	Norway	2:40:48
16	Heather MacDuff	United Kingdom	2:41:02
17	Anne Hannam	New Zealand	2:41:20
18	Mary O'Connor	New Zealand	2:42:25
19	Anita-Lynn Nielsen	Denmark	2:42:47
20	Zehava Shmueli	Israel	2:43:26

=== Wheelchair men ===
Position	Athlete	Nationality	Time
1st place, gold medalist(s)	Ted Vince	Canada	2:01:37
2nd place, silver medalist(s)	Mike Bishop	United Kingdom	2:01:42
3rd place, bronze medalist(s)	Chris Hallam	United Kingdom	2:04:39
4	Kevin Breen	Ireland	2:21:44
5	Ivan Newman	United Kingdom	2:22:58
6	David Todd	United Kingdom	2:25:06
7	Ton Bonte	Netherlands	2:26:17
8	John Harris	United Kingdom	2:27:51
9	Colin Price	United Kingdom	2:32:26
10	Mark Agar	United Kingdom	2:32:39

=== Wheelchair women ===
Position	Athlete	Nationality	Time
1st place, gold medalist(s)	Karen Davidson	United Kingdom	2:41:45
2nd place, silver medalist(s)	Josie Cichockyj	United Kingdom	3:13:27
3rd place, bronze medalist(s)	Collette Rush	United Kingdom	3:25:49
