= 1985 London Marathon =

5th London Marathon

5th London Marathon
- Venue: London, United Kingdom
- Date: 21 April 1985

Champions
- Men: Steve Jones (2:08:16)
- Women: Ingrid Kristiansen (2:21:06)
- Wheelchair men: Chris Hallam (2:19:53)
- Wheelchair women: Kay McShane (2:47:12)

The 1985 London Marathon was the fifth running of the annual marathon race in London, United Kingdom, which took place on Sunday, 21 April. The elite men's race was won by home athlete Steve Jones in a time of 2:08:16 hours and the women's race was won by Norway's Ingrid Kristiansen in 2:21:06. Kristiansen's time was a marathon world record, knocking over a minute and a half off Joan Benoit's previous mark.

In the wheelchair races, Britain's Chris Hallam (2:19:53) and Ireland's Kay McShane (2:47:12) set course records in the men's and women's divisions, respectively.

Around 83,000 people applied to enter the race, of which 22,274 had their applications accepted and 17,500 started the race. A total of 15,873 runners finished the race.

== Results ==
=== Men ===
Position	Athlete	Nationality	Time
1st place, gold medalist(s)	Steve Jones	United Kingdom	2:08:16
2nd place, silver medalist(s)	Charlie Spedding	United Kingdom	2:08:33
3rd place, bronze medalist(s)	Allister Hutton	United Kingdom	2:09:16
4	Christoph Herle	West Germany	2:09:23
5	Henrik Jørgensen	Denmark	2:09:43
6	Pat Petersen	United States	2:11:23
7	Bogumił Kuś	Poland	2:11:43
8	Øyvind Dahl	Norway	2:12:57
9	Eirik Berge	Norway	2:13:00
10	Mark Burnhope	United Kingdom	2:13:54
11	Mike Gratton	United Kingdom	2:14:35
12	Trevor Wright	New Zealand	2:14:51
13	Lindsay Robertson	United Kingdom	2:14:59
14	Nicholas Brawn	United Kingdom	2:15:00
15	Ieuan Ellis	United Kingdom	2:15:02
16	Robin Nash	United Kingdom	2:15:12
17	Graham Payne	United Kingdom	2:15:17
18	James Dingwall	United Kingdom	2:15:24
19	Andrew Girling	United Kingdom	3:28:38
20	Esa Tikkanen	Finland	2:15:45

=== Women ===
Position	Athlete	Nationality	Time
1st place, gold medalist(s)	Ingrid Kristiansen	Norway	2:21:06
2nd place, silver medalist(s)	Sarah Rowell	United Kingdom	2:28:06
3rd place, bronze medalist(s)	Sally Ann Hales	United Kingdom	2:28:38
4	Ann Ford	United Kingdom	2:31:19
5	Mary O'Connor	New Zealand	2:32:35
6	Katy Laetsch	United States	2:33:20
7	Lynda Bain	United Kingdom	2:33:38
8	Sally Ellis	United Kingdom	2:34:58
9	Véronique Marot	United Kingdom	2:35:12
10	Carolyn Horne	United Kingdom	2:37:26
11	Antonella Bizioli	Italy	2:37:47
12	Annette Roberts	United Kingdom	2:39:04
13	Anne Grohansen	Norway	2:39:30
14	Kim Webb	United Kingdom	2:39:53
15	Celia Duncan	United Kingdom	2:42:56
16	Mette Holm	Denmark	2:43:26
17	Sandra Lappage	United Kingdom	2:44:42
18	Angie Hulley	United Kingdom	2:45:58
19	Barbara Byrnes	Australia	2:46:20
20	Eva Isaacs	Sweden	2:46:21

=== Wheelchair men ===
Position	Athlete	Nationality	Time
1st place, gold medalist(s)	Chris Hallam	United Kingdom	2:19:53
2nd place, silver medalist(s)	Gerry O'Rourke	Ireland	2:19:55
3rd place, bronze medalist(s)	Mike Bishop	United Kingdom	2:26:52
4	Kevin Breen	Ireland	2:31:44
5	John Grant	United Kingdom	2:38:54
6	Joseph Fletcher	United Kingdom	2:38:58
7	Gerry Kinsella	United Kingdom	2:44:57
8	Gordon Perry	United Kingdom	2:48:31
9	Mark Agar	United Kingdom	2:51:59
10	Steven Baumber	United Kingdom	2:52:39

=== Wheelchair women ===
Position	Athlete	Nationality	Time
1st place, gold medalist(s)	Kay McShane	Ireland	2:47:12
2nd place, silver medalist(s)	Josie Cichockyj	United Kingdom	2:55:44
3rd place, bronze medalist(s)	Denise Smith	United Kingdom	3:21:19
4	Karen Davidson	United Kingdom	3:27:09
5	Joanne Roberts	United Kingdom	4:00:47
