= 1987 London Marathon =

7th London Marathon

7th London Marathon
- Venue: London, United Kingdom
- Date: 10 May 1987

Champions
- Men: Hiromi Taniguchi (2:09:50)
- Women: Ingrid Kristiansen (2:22:48)
- Wheelchair men: Chris Hallam (2:08:34)
- Wheelchair women: Karen Davidson (2:45:30)

The 1987 London Marathon was the seventh running of the annual marathon race in London, United Kingdom, which took place on Sunday, 10 May. The elite men's race was won by Japan's Hiromi Taniguchi in a time of 2:09:50 hours and the women's race was won by Norway's Ingrid Kristiansen in 2:22:48.

In the wheelchair races, British athletes Chris Hallam (2:08:34) and Karen Davidson (2:45:30) set course records in their wins of the men's and women's divisions, respectively. This was the first time that the winning time for the men's wheelchair race surpassed that of the able-bodied race.

Around 80,000 people applied to enter the race, of which 28,364 had their applications accepted and 21,485 started the race. A total of 19,586 runners finished the race.

== Results ==
=== Men ===
Position	Athlete	Nationality	Time
1st place, gold medalist(s)	Hiromi Taniguchi	Japan	2:09:50
2nd place, silver medalist(s)	El Mostafa Nechchadi	Morocco	2:10:09
3rd place, bronze medalist(s)	Hugh Jones	United Kingdom	2:10:11
4	Gianni Poli	Italy	2:10:15
5	Geir Kvernmo	Norway	2:10:17
6	Mehmet Terzi	Turkey	2:10:25
7	Bogusław Psujek	Poland	2:10:26
8	Charlie Spedding	United Kingdom	2:10:32
9	Dave Edge	Canada	2:11:51
10	Jean-Pierre Paumen	Belgium	2:12:15
11	John Graham	United Kingdom	2:12:32
12	Pat Petersen	United States	2:12:42
13	John Wheway	United Kingdom	2:13:21
14	Petr Klimes	Czechoslovakia	2:13:27
15	Pawel Lorens	Poland	2:13:46
16	Dominique Chauvelier	France	2:13:51
17	Christian Wolfsberg	Denmark	2:13:57
18	Jan Ikov	Denmark	2:14:06
19	Cidálio Caetano	Portugal	2:14:06
20	Pavel Klimes	Czechoslovakia	2:14:07

=== Women ===
Position	Athlete	Nationality	Time
1st place, gold medalist(s)	Ingrid Kristiansen	Norway	2:22:48
2nd place, silver medalist(s)	Priscilla Welch	United Kingdom	2:26:51
3rd place, bronze medalist(s)	Véronique Marot	United Kingdom	2:30:15
4	Paula Fudge	United Kingdom	2:32:28
5	Karolina Szabó	Hungary	2:32:48
6	Misako Miyahara	Japan	2:33:41
7	Ágnes Sipka	Hungary	2:34:37
8	Angie Hulley	United Kingdom	2:34:47
9	Sissel Grottenberg	Norway	2:35:53
10	Valentina Bottarelli	Italy	2:35:57
11	Sally Ellis	United Kingdom	2:36:48
12	Christine Kennedy	Ireland	2:36:58
13	Susan Stone	Canada	2:37:16
14	Glynis Penny	United Kingdom	2:38:23
15	Renata Walendziak	Poland	2:38:57
16	Ailish Smyth	Ireland	2:40:24
17	Zehava Shmueli	Israel	2:40:37
18	Rosemary Ellis	United Kingdom	2:41:05
19	Annette Roberts	United Kingdom	2:41:51
20	Gillian Beschloss	United Kingdom	2:42:06

=== Wheelchair men ===
Position	Athlete	Nationality	Time
1st place, gold medalist(s)	Chris Hallam	United Kingdom	2:08:34
2nd place, silver medalist(s)	Jan Ove-Mattson	Sweden	2:23:15
3rd place, bronze medalist(s)	Kevin Breen	Ireland	2:26:28
4	Patrick Bailey	United Kingdom	2:28:53
5	John Harris	United Kingdom	2:34:50
6	Ton Bente	Netherlands	2:38:30
7	John Naude	United Kingdom	2:40:15
8	Wimk Zwanepol	?	2:40:50
9	David Todd	United Kingdom	2:43:51
10	Chas Sadler	United Kingdom	2:46:51

=== Wheelchair women ===
Position	Athlete	Nationality	Time
1st place, gold medalist(s)	Karen Davidson	United Kingdom	2:45:30
2nd place, silver medalist(s)	Denise Smith	United Kingdom	3:53:46
3rd place, bronze medalist(s)	Deborah Beales	United Kingdom	4:09:18
