= 1986 London Marathon =

6th London Marathon

6th London Marathon
- Venue: London, United Kingdom
- Date: 20 April 1986

Champions
- Men: Toshihiko Seko (2:10:02)
- Women: Grete Waitz (2:24:54)
- Wheelchair men: Gerry O'Rourke (2:26:38)
- Wheelchair women: Kay McShane (3:02:40)

The 1986 London Marathon was the sixth running of the annual marathon race in London, United Kingdom, which took place on Sunday, 20 April. The elite men's race was won by Japan's Toshihiko Seko in a time of 2:10:02 hours and the women's race was won by Norway's Grete Waitz in 2:24:54.

In the wheelchair races, Irish athletes Gerry O'Rourke (2:26:38) and Kay McShane (2:47:12) won the men's and women's divisions, respectively.

Around 80,000 people applied to enter the race, of which 25,566 had their applications accepted and 19,261 started the race. A total of 18,067 runners finished the race.

== Results ==
=== Men ===
| Position | Athlete | Nationality | Time |
|---|---|---|---|
| 1st place, gold medalist(s) | Toshihiko Seko | Japan | 2:10:02 |
| 2nd place, silver medalist(s) | Hugh Jones | United Kingdom | 2:11:42 |
| 3rd place, bronze medalist(s) | Allister Hutton | United Kingdom | 2:12:36 |
| 4 | Pat Petersen | United States | 2:12:56 |
| 5 | Mehmet Terzi | Turkey | 2:13:02 |
| 6 | Yutaka Kanai | Japan | 2:13:42 |
| 7 | Henrik Albahn | Denmark | 2:14:34 |
| 8 | Ieuan Ellis | United Kingdom | 2:14:38 |
| 9 | Geir Kvernmo | Norway | 2:14:48 |
| 10 | Cidálio Caetano | Portugal | 2:14:57 |
| 11 | Oddmund Roalkvam | Norway | 2:14:59 |
| 12 | Philip O'Brien | United Kingdom | 2:15:00 |
| 13 | Lindsay Robertson | United Kingdom | 2:15:03 |
| 14 | Peter Lyrenmann | Switzerland | 2:15:06 |
| 15 | Kevin Forster | United Kingdom | 2:15:19 |
| 16 | Richard Umberg | Switzerland | 2:15:46 |
| 17 | Zhu Shuchun | China | 2:15:47 |
| 18 | Gyula Borka | Hungary | 2:15:53 |
| 19 | Eleuterio Antón | Spain | 2:15:54 |
| 20 | John Wheway | United Kingdom | 2:15:56 |

=== Women ===
| Position | Athlete | Nationality | Time |
|---|---|---|---|
| 1st place, gold medalist(s) | Grete Waitz | Norway | 2:24:54 |
| 2nd place, silver medalist(s) | Mary O'Connor | New Zealand | 2:30:52 |
| 3rd place, bronze medalist(s) | Ann Ford | United Kingdom | 2:31:40 |
| 4 | Sylvie Bornet | France | 2:31:43 |
| 5 | Paula Fudge | United Kingdom | 2:32:25 |
| 6 | Kersti Jakobsen | Denmark | 2:32:53 |
| 7 | Julia Armstrong | United Kingdom | 2:36:31 |
| 8 | Glynis Penny | United Kingdom | 2:38:47 |
| 9 | Jacqueline Hulbert | United Kingdom | 2:39:26 |
| 10 | Deborah Butterfield | United States | 2:41:11 |
| 11 | Angie Hulley | United Kingdom | 2:41:12 |
| 12 | Carolyn Naisby | United Kingdom | 2:41:57 |
| 13 | Oddrun Hovsengen | Norway | 2:42:05 |
| 14 | Christine Kennedy | Ireland | 2:42:18 |
| 15 | Yuko Gordon | Hong Kong | 2:42:23 |
| 16 | Mora Main | Australia | 2:43:15 |
| 17 | Sandra Lappage | United Kingdom | 2:43:54 |
| 18 | Rosemary Ellis | United Kingdom | 2:45:19 |
| 19 | Eva Isaacs | Sweden | 2:45:28 |
| 20 | Tanya Maria Ball | United Kingdom | 2:45:30 |

=== Wheelchair men ===
| Position | Athlete | Nationality | Time |
|---|---|---|---|
| 1st place, gold medalist(s) | Gerry O'Rourke | Ireland | 2:26:38 |
| 2nd place, silver medalist(s) | Mike Bishop | United Kingdom | 2:29:14 |
| 3rd place, bronze medalist(s) | Chris Hallam | United Kingdom | 2:30:59 |
| 4 | Terje Roel | Norway | 2:36:13 |
| 5 | Kevin Breen | Ireland | 2:43:52 |
| 6 | Michael Cunnham | ? | 2:50:52 |
| 7 | John Naude | United Kingdom | 2:50:59 |
| 8 | Graham Stones | United Kingdom | 2:51:04 |
| 9 | Gerry Kinsella | Ireland | 2:55:46 |
| 10 | Chas Sadler | United Kingdom | 2:57:01 |

=== Wheelchair women ===
| Position | Athlete | Nationality | Time |
|---|---|---|---|
| 1st place, gold medalist(s) | Kay McShane | Ireland | 3:02:40 |
| 2nd place, silver medalist(s) | Karen Davidson | United Kingdom | 3:24:53 |
| 3rd place, bronze medalist(s) | Denise Smith | United Kingdom | 4:07:57 |
| 4 | Sheila Watkins | United Kingdom | 5:58:30 |
