= 1984 London Marathon =

4th London Marathon

4th London Marathon
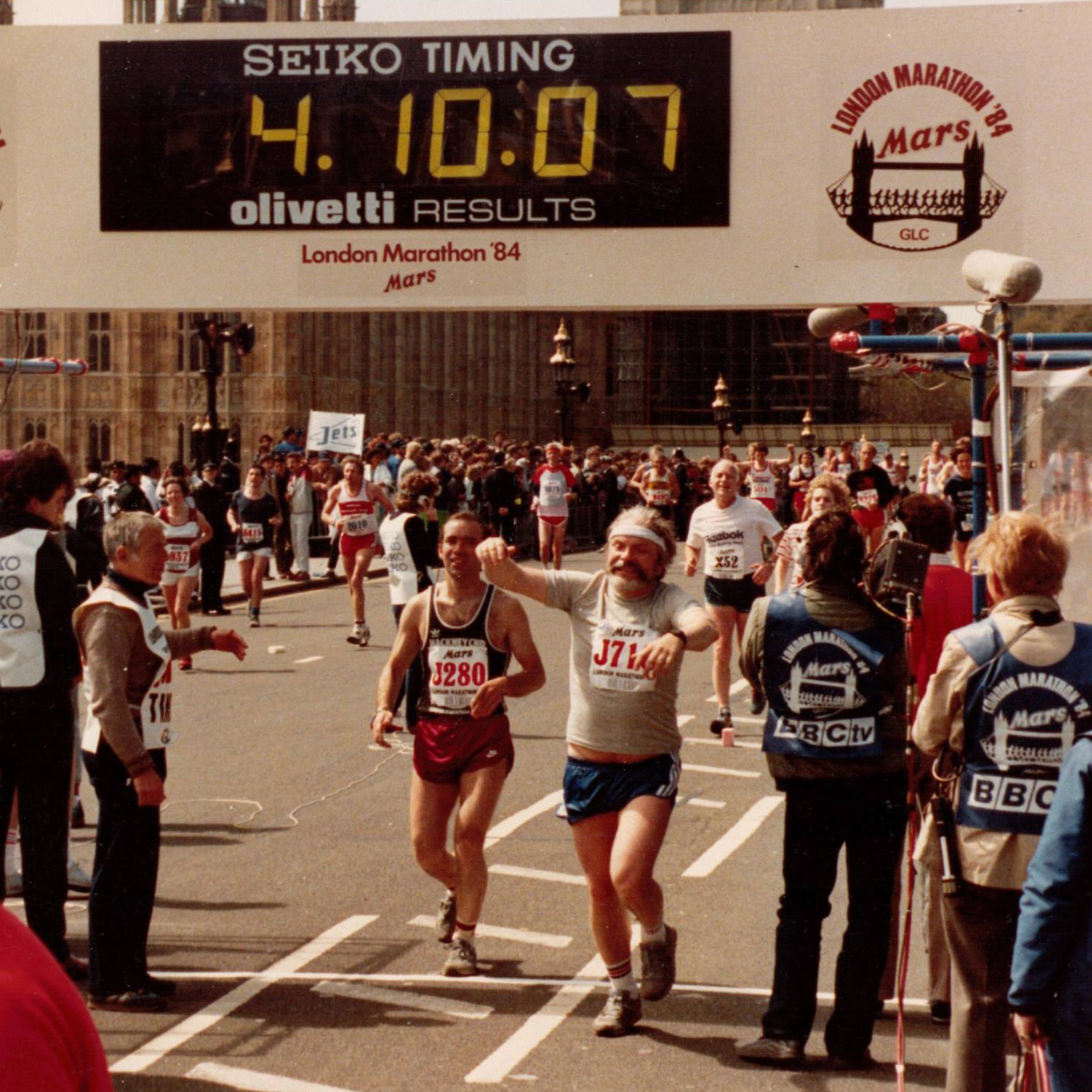
- Finishers in the mass race
- Venue: London, United Kingdom
- Date: 13 May 1984

Champions
- Men: Charlie Spedding (2:09:57)
- Women: Ingrid Kristiansen (2:24:26)
- Wheelchair men: Kevin Breen (2:38:40)
- Wheelchair women: Kay McShane (3:10:04)

The 1984 London Marathon was the fourth running of the annual marathon race in London, United Kingdom, which took place on Sunday, 13 May. The elite men's race was won by home athlete Charlie Spedding in a time of 2:09:57 hours, and the women's race was won by Norway's Ingrid Kristiansen in 2:24:26.

In the wheelchair races, Irish athletes Kevin Breen (2:38:40) and Kay McShane (3:10:04) set course records in the men's and women's divisions, respectively.

Around 70,000 people applied to enter the race, of which 21,142 had their applications accepted and 16,992 started the race. A total of 15,675 runners finished the race.

== Results ==
=== Men ===
Position	Athlete	Nationality	Time
1st place, gold medalist(s)	Charlie Spedding	United Kingdom	2:09:57
2nd place, silver medalist(s)	Kevin Forster	United Kingdom	2:11:41
3rd place, bronze medalist(s)	Dennis Fowles	United Kingdom	2:12:12
4	Øyvind Dahl	Norway	2:12:19
5	Jørn Lauenborg	Denmark	2:12:21
6	Juma Ikangaa	Tanzania	2:12:35
7	James Ashworth	United Kingdom	2:13:49
8	Malcolm East	United Kingdom	2:14:01
9	Christopher Bunyan	United Kingdom	2:14:03
10	Svend Erik Kristensen	Denmark	2:14:22
11	John Graham	United Kingdom	2:14:40
12	Stephen-Glenn Forster	United Kingdom	2:15:08
13	Luis Horta	Portugal	2:15:12
14	Kingston Mills	Ireland	2:15:14
15	Zoltan Kiss	Hungary	2:15:17
16	Jan-Erik Vilholmen	Norway	2:15:35
17	Mervyn Brameld	United Kingdom	2:15:38
18	Fraser Clyne	United Kingdom	2:15:5
19	Gaspar Esnaola	Spain	2:16:14
20	Gary Huckle	United Kingdom	2:14:25

=== Women ===
Position	Athlete	Nationality	Time
1st place, gold medalist(s)	Ingrid Kristiansen	Norway	2:24:26
2nd place, silver medalist(s)	Priscilla Welch	United Kingdom	2:30:06
3rd place, bronze medalist(s)	Sarah Rowell	United Kingdom	2:31:28
4	Véronique Marot	United Kingdom	2:33:52
5	Kersti Jakobsen	Denmark	2:34:53
6	Bente Moe	Norway	2:35:28
7	Julie Barleycorn	United Kingdom	2:35:53
8	Margaret Lockley	United Kingdom	2:36:06
9	Gillian Horovitz	United Kingdom	2:37:10
10	Lone Dybdal	Denmark	2:39:39
11	Heidi Jacobsen	Norway	2:39:54
12	Gillian Castka	United Kingdom	2:41:21
13	Karen Holdsworth	United Kingdom	2:42:51
14	Kim Webb	United Kingdom	2:43:55
15	Maureen Hurst	United Kingdom	2:44:13
16	Lorna Irving	United Kingdom	2:44:15
17	Lynda Bain	United Kingdom	2:45:03
18	May-Britt Aastad	Sweden	2:45:22
19	Annette Roberts	United Kingdom	2:45:43
20	Carol Gould	United Kingdom	2:45:59

=== Wheelchair men ===
Position	Athlete	Nationality	Time
1st place, gold medalist(s)	Kevin Breen	Ireland	2:38:40
2nd place, silver medalist(s)	Mick Karaphillides	United Kingdom	2:44:31
3rd place, bronze medalist(s)	Gordon Perry	United Kingdom	2:45:12
4	Joseph Fletcher	United Kingdom	2:51:55
5	Arthur Walton	United Kingdom	2:59:10
6	Andrew D'Costa	?	3:10:10
7	Leroy Dobson	United Kingdom	3:15:03
8	Ric Casell	United Kingdom	3:18:49
9	John Naude	United Kingdom	3:26:39
10	Shahriar Esfandiari	Iran	3:32:06

=== Wheelchair women ===
Position	Athlete	Nationality	Time
1st place, gold medalist(s)	Kay McShane	Ireland	3:10:04
2nd place, silver medalist(s)	Denise Smith	United Kingdom	3:57:52
3rd place, bronze medalist(s)	Joanne Roberts	United Kingdom	4:05:52
