= Morpeth To Newcastle Road Race =

Road running event in England

The Morpeth To Newcastle Road Race (short The Morpeth) was the oldest road running event in England, United Kingdom and was traditionally run on New Year's Day from Morpeth to Newcastle-upon-Tyne.

== History ==
The event begun in 1904 between Morpeth and Newcastle-upon-Tyne covering a distance of 13.6 miles (21.9 km) but was later changed to 14.1 miles (22.7 km) in 1983. Only in 2002 was the road race standardised to the half-marathon distance.

In 2002 the sponsor pulled out and finance for safety precautions became a serious issue for the host club Morpeth Harriers. The race was moved away from its traditional New Year's Day slot to the second Sunday in January. The last official Morpeth was run in its centenary Year of 2004.

Ultimately the race was cancelled in 2005 and 2006 as safety issues could not be resolved with the local authorities. In particular the police, who proposed a new route via Dinnington (which was met with much resistance from the current organisers).

At present, Morpeth Harriers host an 11k road race on New Year's Day in which there are over 100 competitors.

In 2016 a new race called Morpeth 2 Newcastle incorporating a marathon and a half marathon took place on 30 October.

== Winners ==
The title of most victories belongs to that of Dunky Wright who scored seven wins. North-East based athlete Jim Alder who represented Scotland in the 1966 Kingston Commonwealth Games and won a Gold medal in the marathon has also claimed five victories in this event.

=== Morpeth to Newcastle Marathon (2016–). ===
Date	Time (h:m:s)	Men's race	Time (h:m:s)	Women's race
30 October 2016	2:38:08	Conrad Franks	3:16:14	Gillian Allen

=== North Tyneside to Newcastle Half Marathon (2016–). ===
Date	Time (h:m:s)	Men's race	Time (h:m:s)	Women's race
30 October 2016	1:09:24	Abraham Tewelde	1:31:22	Andrea Banner

=== Over Half Marathon distance (2002–2004). ===
Date	Time (h:m:s)	Men's race	Time (h:m:s)	Women's race
11 January 2004	1:07:23	Huw Lobb	1:16:35	Annie Emmerson
12 January 2003	1:07:48	David Norman	1:15:36	Andrea Green
13 January 2002	1:07:24	Dominic Bannister	1:21:16	Jan Roxburgh

=== Over 22.7 km course (1983–2001). ===
Date	Time (h:m:s)	Men's race	Time (h:m:s)	Women's race
1 January 2001	1:13:04	Mark Hudspith	1:28:02	Sheila Allen
1 January 2000	1:11:23	Mark Hudspith	1:25:51	Jill Boltz
1 January 1999	1:13:29	Ian Hudspith	1:24:54	Tracey Brindley
1 January 1998	1:15:30	Brian Rushworth	1:26:58	Sandra Branney
1 January 1997	1:10:03	Mark Hudspith	1:22:44	Jane Shields
1 January 1996	1:09:44	Steve Brace	1:25:11	Anne Hegvold
1 January 1995	1:08:07	Ian Hudspith	1:18:30	Catherine Mijovic
1 January 1994	1:09:50	Colin Walker	1:20:00	Lynn Harding
1 January 1993	1:10:24	Mark Hudspith	1:22:20	Lynn Harding
1 January 1992	1:09:35	Paul Evans (athlete)	1:20:23	Lynn Harding
1 January 1991	1:12:27	Paul Davies-Hale	1:23:58	Angela Hulley
1 January 1990	1:09:14	Paul Cuskin	1:20:08	Veronique Marot
1 January 1989	1:09:17	Fraser Clyne	1:16:33	Angela Hulley
1 January 1988	1:08:33	Paul Davies-Hale	1:19:26	Susan Crehan
1 January 1987	1:12:24	Peter Tootell	1:21:22	Veronique Marot
1 January 1986	1:07:02	Paul Davies-Hale	1:18:06	Veronique Marot
1 January 1985	1:05:38	Allister Hutton	1:22:03	Sue Gaskell
1 January 1984	1:09:06	Allister Hutton	1:19:44	Angela Tooby
1 January 1983	1:08:24	Kevin Forster	1:23:58	Margaret Lockley
