= Athletics at the 1982 Commonwealth Games – Men's 10,000 metres =

Men's 10,000 metres at the Commonwealth Games

The men's 10,000 metres event at the 1982 Commonwealth Games was held on 3 October at the QE II Stadium in Brisbane, Australia.

== Results ==
Rank	Name	Nationality	Time	Notes
1st place, gold medalist(s)	Gidamis Shahanga	Tanzania	28:10.20	
2nd place, silver medalist(s)	Zacharia Barie	Tanzania	28:10.60	
3rd place, bronze medalist(s)	Julian Goater	England	28:16.20	
4	Charlie Spedding	England	28:25.00	
5	Allister Hutton	Scotland	28:28.70	
6	Dennis Fowles	Wales	28:33.90	
7	Zephaniah Ncube	Zimbabwe	28:38.85	
8	Lawrence Whitty	Australia	28:43.93	
9	Mike McLeod	England	28:46.97	
10	Marios Kassianidis	Cyprus	28:57.94	
11	Steve Jones	Wales	29:13.68	
12	Peter Butler	Canada	29:16.89	
13	Esau Zwane	Swaziland	30:02.74	
14	Nada Meta	Swaziland	30:03.84	
15	Peter Koech	Kenya	30:06.00	
16	Erastus Kimei	Kenya	30:36.00	
17	Nicholas Akers	Cayman Islands	35:21.79	
18	David Bonn	Cayman Islands	41:21.49	
	Shiri Chand	Fiji	DNF	
	Tau Tokwepota	Papua New Guinea	DNF	
	Abel Manumanua	Papua New Guinea	DNF	
	Mackay Talasasa	Solomon Islands	DNF	
	John Andrews	Australia	DNS	
