= Great North Run =

Largest Road Race in the UK, North East England, September

- Date: September annually (occasionally October)
- Location: Newcastle upon Tyne to South Shields, England, UK
- Event type: Road
- Distance: Half marathon
- Primary sponsor: AJ Bell
- Established: 1981
- Course records: Men: (Kenya) Martin Mathathi 58:56; Women: (Kenya) Brigid Kosgei 1:04:28
- Website: Great North Run

The Great North Run, or AJ Bell Great North Run, is the largest half marathon in the world. It takes place annually in North East England each September. Participants run between Newcastle upon Tyne and South Shields. The run was devised by Olympic 10,000 m bronze medallist and BBC Sport commentator Brendan Foster. Since 2025, the run has sponsored and shared its branding with The Great North, a partnership of elected mayors across Northern England.

The first Great North Run was staged on 28 June 1981, when 12,000 runners participated. By 2011, the number of participants had risen to 54,000. For the first year it was advertised as a local fun run; nearly thirty years on it has become one of the biggest running events in the world and the biggest in the UK. Only the London Marathon comes close to attracting similar numbers of athletes each year.

The 1992 edition of the race incorporated the 1st IAAF World Half Marathon Championships. The event also has junior and mini races attached with these being run the Saturday before the main race on the Newcastle Quayside. Martin Mathathi holds the current men's course record with his run of 58:56 in 2011. In 2019, Brigid Kosgei's women's course record of 64:28 bettered the previous mark by over a minute and was also the fastest ever half marathon by a woman; however, the course was not eligible for records. That same year, Mo Farah won a record sixth consecutive men's Great North Run.

== Course ==
The Great North Run starts in Newcastle upon Tyne on the A167 road just north of the central motorway, on the edge of both the city centre and the Town Moor. The route heads east and south down the motorway section, around the eastern side of the city centre, then crosses the Tyne Bridge into Gateshead. It heads around the eastern side of Gateshead town centre, then at a roundabout turns east and heads down the A184 (the Felling Bypass) in the direction of Sunderland. After 3.5 miles (5.6 km), the route turns off the A184 and heads north-east towards South Shields down the A194 (Leam Lane). 2.5 miles (4.0 km) later, the route reaches the southern side of Jarrow and it turns east down the A1300 (John Reid Road). The route passes through the south of South Shields (through Harton and Marsden) until it reaches the seafront just over 3.5 miles (5.6 km) later, where it turns north up the A183. The last mile (1.6 km) of the route runs along the seafront road to the finishing line at South Shields. All roads on the course are closed several hours before the race begins; however, multiple vehicles including TV crews, emergency services, event staff, and a fleet of buses carrying participants' belongings are authorised to travel between Newcastle and South Shields on the closed course roads ahead of and following the participants.

== History ==
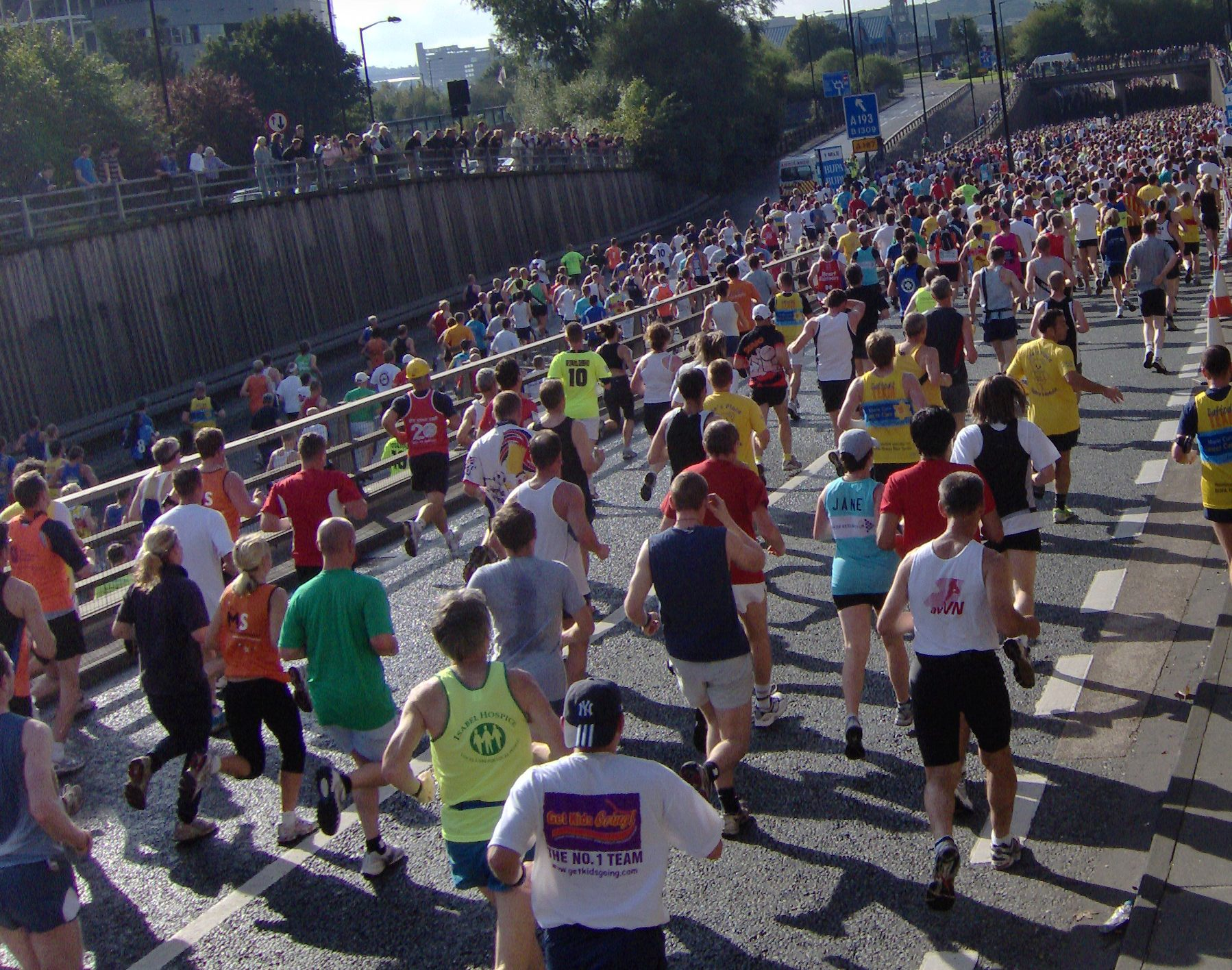
The Great North Run is a mass participation event: two lines of runners merging near the one mile mark.

The run was devised by former Olympic 10,000 m bronze medallist and BBC Sport commentator Brendan Foster. Foster was inspired after running in the Round the Bays Race in New Zealand in 1979, and has built upon the Great North Run with a series of other Great Run road races.

The first Great North Run was staged on 28 June 1981, when 12,000 runners participated. By 2003, the number of participants had risen to 47,000. The 2011 event saw an announced field of 54,000. The number of finishers was 35,777 in 2007, the largest half marathon and the 13th largest running race that year. In 2014, the event had 41,615 finishers, making it the largest half-marathon in the world as certified by Guinness World Records in 2016.

For the first nine races, eight of them were held in June. Since 1990, the race has instead been held in the autumn, usually in September but occasionally in October. Since 1990, the earliest date the race has been held on is 7 September (2014) and the latest is 22 October (2000). Bupa was the title partner of the Great North Run from the early 1990s until 2014, one of Britain's longest ever sports sponsorship agreements. In 2015 Morrisons announced their sponsorship of the Great Run series. In November 2015, the Great Run Company announced it was searching for a new title sponsor which includes the Great North Run. The 2016 Great North Run was the first staging of the event without a title sponsor. Simplyhealth became the new lead sponsor for 2017. AJ Bell became the new lead sponsor for the Great Run series in 2023, with an expected 5-year partnership.

=== Events ===
2017 Great North Run finishers medal

In 2004 a runner died (the eighth death in the event's then 24-year history).

The 2005 Great North Run was the twenty-fifth edition of the race. Events to mark the anniversary included the launch of the Great North Run Cultural Programme at the Sage Gateshead. The race was started by Mike McLeod, the winner of the inaugural race in 1981. During the race, four participants died en route to South Shields. An inquest into the four deaths from 2005 began on Monday 5 June 2006 at Gateshead Council Chambers. In subsequent events, more emergency service personnel were brought in to ensure there was adequate cover. In spite of increased medical provision at the 2006 race, a man in his twenties died.

The 2007 Great North Run was held on 30 September and was started by former England and Newcastle United manager Sir Bobby Robson. Kara Goucher defeated Paula Radcliffe in an impressive victory for the American. Goucher's winning time was 1:06:57.

The 2008 Great North Run was held on 5 October and was started by former Prime Minister of the United Kingdom Tony Blair.

The 2009 Great North Run was held on 20 September and was started by the musician Sting.

The 2010 Great North Run was the 30th running of the event and was held on 19 September and was started by TV presenters Ant & Dec. The number of finishers (half marathon only) was 39,459.

The 2011 Great North Run took place on the morning of Sunday, 18 September 2011. The race was started by World 5,000-metre champion Mo Farah.

In 2013 the 33rd Great North Run had 56,000 participants, most of whom were raising money for charity. The elite races had Olympic Gold Medalists and World Champion long-distance runners participating including in the men's race, Mo Farah, Kenenisa Bekele and a regular supporter of the event, Haile Gebrselassie. Ethiopian Bekele won the men's event just ahead of Farah. Kenya's Priscah Jeptoo came first the women's race and multi Olympic Gold Medalist David Weir won the wheelchair event.

In 2014 the 34th Great North Run had 57,000 participants, celebrated the 1 millionth runner to cross the finish line, and was the first to have a British man win in 29 years. Mo Farah completed the race in exactly 1 hour, while Mary Keitany completed in 1:05:39 seconds - surpassing the previous course record of 1:05:40 by 1 second, a record held by Paula Radcliffe. Tracey Cramond, who was raising money for Butterwick Hospices, was the 1 millionth person to complete the run, stating she was "gobsmacked" and that it was her "moment of fame". The Great North Run was the first International Athletics Association Event (IAAF) event in the world to reach such a milestone.

In 2015 a 58 year old male runner died.

The 2020 Great North Run was cancelled due to the COVID-19 pandemic. The 2022 event cancelled its Junior and Mini events due to the death of Elizabeth II.

Eddie Howe started the 2023 Great North Run for the 60,000 participants. The race was Mo Farah's last ever before his retirement.

The 2024 Great North Run took place on 8th September and was started by Olympic Silver Medalist Kieran Reilly. A 29 year old male runner died after collapsing during the race.

The 2025 edition was notable for an error where the finisher’s medal features a mislabeled map of Sunderland and the River Wear instead of the Tyne.

The 2026 Great North Run took place on 13th September. Andy Burnham became the first sitting Prime Minister to participate. Two runners died at the event.

The 2027 Great North Run is set to take place on Sunday 12 September, the 46th edition aims to improve on its 2014 Guinness World Record number of finishers (41,615 people).

== Past winners ==
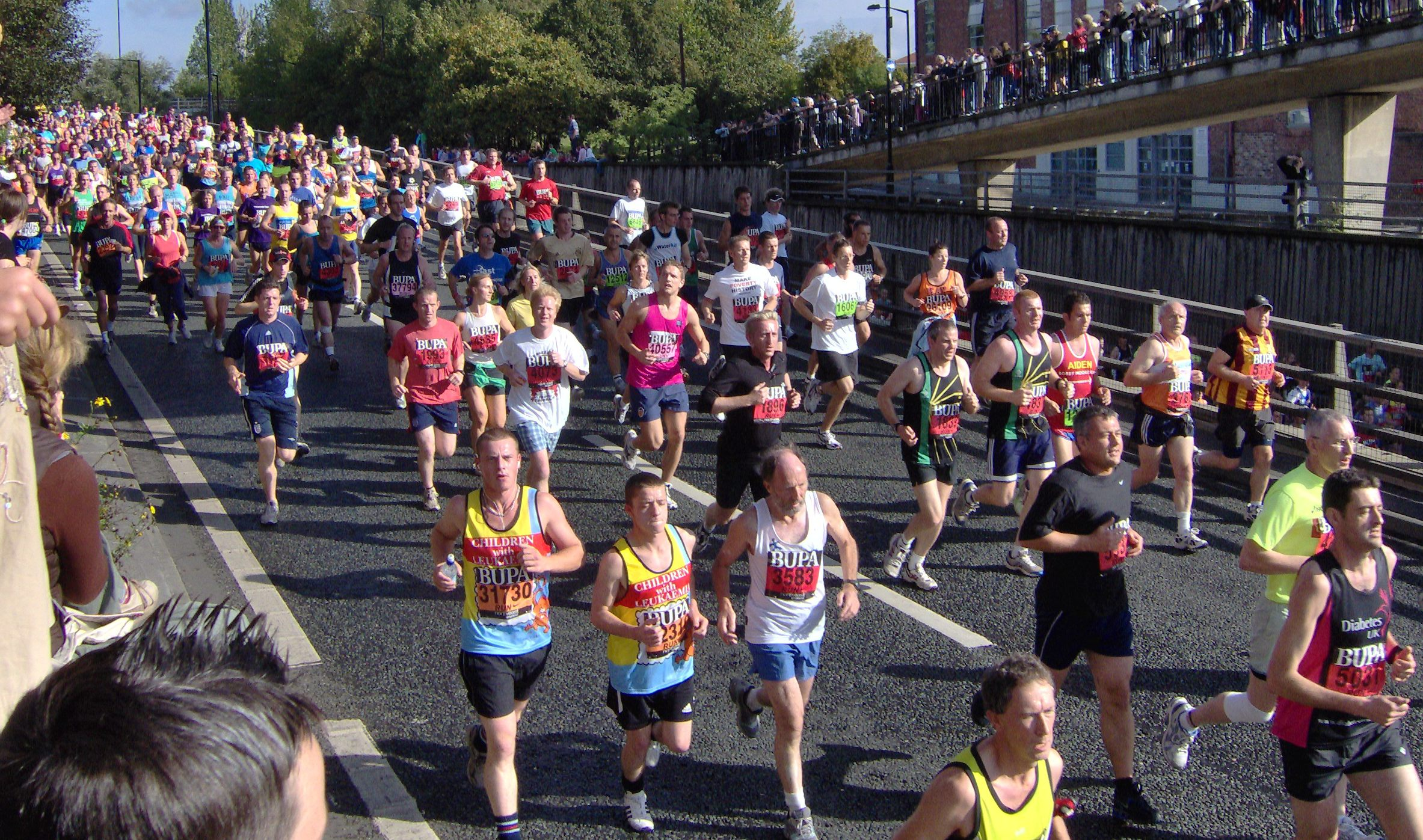
Runners taking part in 2006

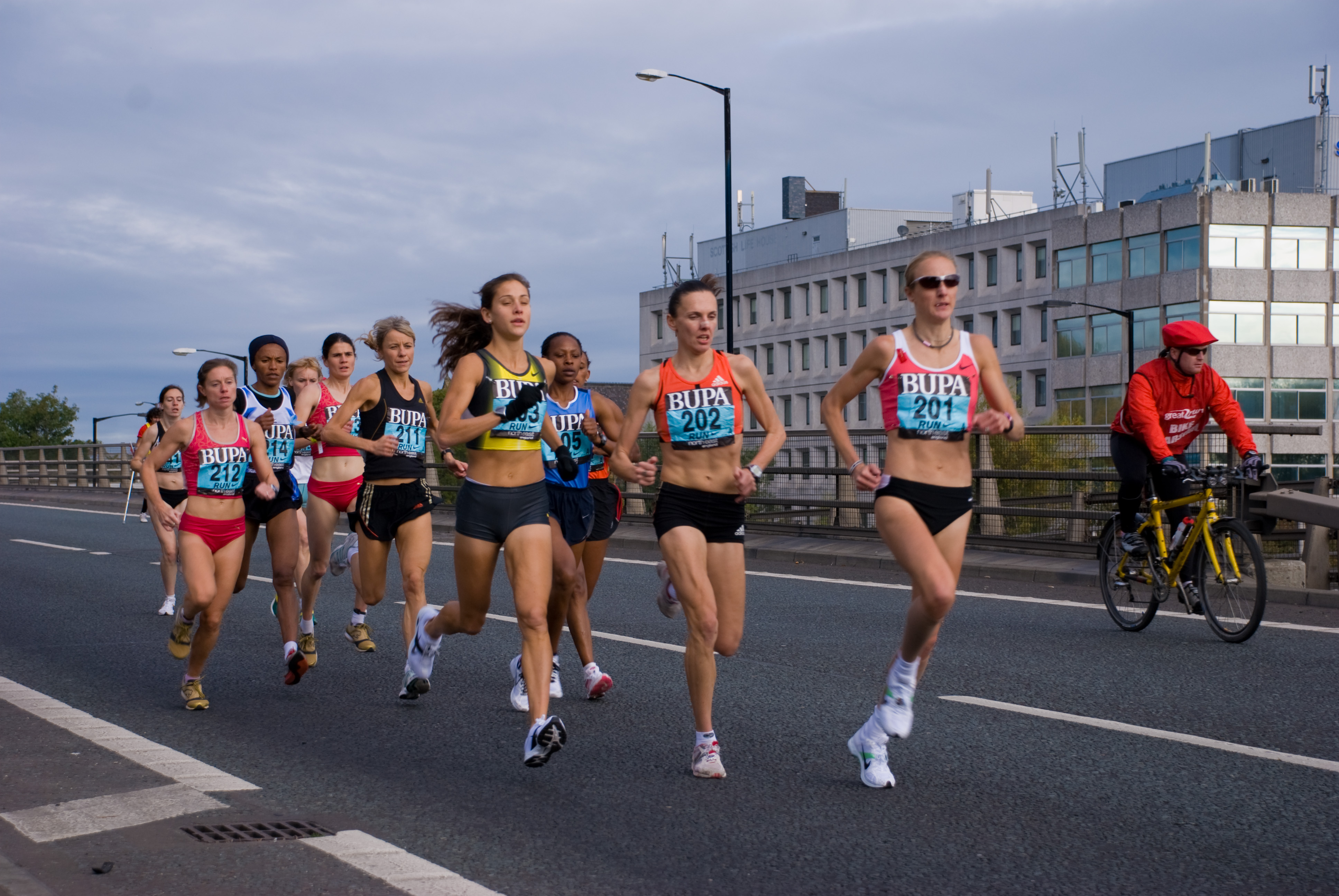
Paula Radcliffe and Kara Goucher heading the pack in the 2007 race

Key: Course record

Edition	Year	Men's winner	Time (h:m:s)	Women's winner	Time (h:m:s)
1st	1981	Mike McLeod (GBR)	1:03:23	Karen Goldhawk (GBR)	1:17:36
2nd	1982	Mike McLeod (GBR)	1:02:44	Margaret Lockley (GBR)	1:19:24
3rd	1983	Carlos Lopes (POR)	1:02:46	Julie Barleycorn (GBR)	1:16:39
4th	1984	Øyvind Dahl (NOR)	1:04:36	Grete Waitz (NOR)	1:10:27
5th	1985	Steve Kenyon (GBR)	1:02:44	Rosa Mota (POR)	1:09:54
6th	1986	Michael Musyoki (KEN)	1:00:43	Lisa Martin (AUS)	1:09:45
7th	1987	Robert de Castella (AUS)	1:02:04	Lisa Martin (AUS)	1:10:00
8th	1988	John Treacy (IRL)	1:01:00	Grete Waitz (NOR)	1:08:49
9th	1989	El Mostafa Nechchadi (MAR)	1:02:39	Lisa Martin (AUS)	1:10:43
10th	1990	Steve Moneghetti (AUS)	1:00:34	Rosa Mota (POR)	1:09:33
11th	1991	Benson Masya (KEN)	1:00:28	Ingrid Kristiansen (NOR)	1:10:57
12th	1992	Benson Masya (KEN)	1:00:24	Liz McColgan (GBR)	1:08:53
13th	1993	Moses Tanui (KEN)	59:47	Tegla Loroupe (KEN)	1:12:55
14th	1994	Benson Masya (KEN)	1:00:02	Rosanna Munerotto (ITA)	1:11:29
15th	1995	Moses Tanui (KEN)	1:00:39	Liz McColgan (GBR)	1:11:42
16th	1996	Benson Masya (KEN)	1:01:43	Liz McColgan (GBR)	1:10:28
17th	1997	Hendrick Ramaala (RSA)	1:00:25	Lucia Subano (KEN)	1:09:24
18th	1998	Josia Thugwane (RSA)	1:02:32	Sonia O'Sullivan (IRL)	1:11:50
19th	1999	John Mutai (KEN)	1:00:52	Joyce Chepchumba (KEN)	1:09:07
20th	2000	Phaustin Baha Sulle (TAN)	1:01:57	Paula Radcliffe (GBR)	1:07:07
21st	2001	Paul Tergat (KEN)	1:00:30	Susan Chepkemei (KEN)	1:08:40
22nd	2002	Paul Kosgei (KEN)	59:58	Sonia O'Sullivan (IRL)	1:07:19
23rd	2003	Hendrick Ramaala (RSA)	1:00:01	Paula Radcliffe (GBR)	1:05:40
24th	2004	Dejene Berhanu (ETH)	59:37	Benita Johnson (AUS)	1:07:55
25th	2005	Zersenay Tadese (ERI)	59:05	Derartu Tulu (ETH)	1:07:33
26th	2006	Hendrick Ramaala (RSA)	1:01:03	Berhane Adere (ETH)	1:10:03
27th	2007	Martin Lel (KEN)	1:00:08	Kara Goucher (USA)	1:06:57
28th	2008	Tsegaye Kebede (ETH)	59:45	Gete Wami (ETH)	1:08:51
29th	2009	Martin Lel (KEN)	59:32	Jéssica Augusto (POR)	1:09:08
30th	2010	Haile Gebrselassie (ETH)	59:33	Berhane Adere (ETH)	1:08:49
31st	2011	Martin Mathathi (KEN)	58:56	Lucy Wangui (KEN)	1:07:06
32nd	2012	Wilson Kipsang (KEN)	59:06	Tirunesh Dibaba (ETH)	1:07:35
33rd	2013	Kenenisa Bekele (ETH)	1:00:09	Priscah Jeptoo (KEN)	1:05:45
34th	2014	Mo Farah (GBR)	1:00:00	Mary Keitany (KEN)	1:05:39
35th	2015	Mo Farah (GBR)	59:22	Mary Keitany (KEN)	1:07:32
36th	2016	Mo Farah (GBR)	1:00:04	Vivian Cheruiyot (KEN)	1:07:54
37th	2017	Mo Farah (GBR)	1:00:06	Mary Keitany (KEN)	1:05:59
38th	2018	Mo Farah (GBR)	59:27	Vivian Cheruiyot (KEN)	1:07:44
39th	2019	Mo Farah (GBR)	59:07	Brigid Kosgei (KEN)	1:04:28
	2020	cancelled			
40th	2021	Marc Scott (GBR)	1:01:22	Hellen Obiri (KEN)	1:07:42
41st	2022	Jacob Kiplimo (UGA)	59:33	Hellen Obiri (KEN)	1:07:05
42nd	2023	Tamirat Tola (ETH)	59:58	Peres Jepchirchir (KEN)	1:06:45
43rd	2024	Abel Kipchumba (KEN)	59:52	Mary Ngugi-Cooper (KEN)	1:07:40
44th	2025	Alexander Mutiso Munyao (KEN)	1:00:52	Sheila Chepkirui (KEN)	1:09:32
45th	2026	Zouhair Talbi (USA)	59:47	Brigid Kosgei (KEN)	1:06:15
46th	2027	TBA	TBA	TBA	TBA

=== Wheelchair race ===
Course record

Edition	Year	Men's winner	Time (h:m:s)	Women's winner	Time (h:m:s)
1st	1981	Alan Robinson (GBR)	1:28:54		
2nd	1982	Alan Robinson (GBR)	1:32:00		
3rd	1983	John Grant (GBR)	1:17:16	Maria Dodsworth (GBR)	2:27:29
4th	1984	Terry Clark (GBR)	1:10:28	Ellen Hodgson (GBR)	2:50:42
5th	1985	Mark Tong (GBR)	1:17:18	Anne Graham (GBR)	2:26:53
6th	1986	Chris Hallam (GBR)	1:01:15	Karen Davidson (GBR)	1:13:04
7th	1987	Chris Hallam (GBR)	56:37	Karen Davidson (GBR)	1:19:55
8th	1988	David Holding (GBR)	57:57	Josie Cichockyj (GBR)	1:37:38
9th	1989	Chris Hallam (GBR)	1:01:40	Eileen Dixon (GBR)	2:06:54
10th	1990	Chris Hallam (GBR)	56:32	Tanni Grey-Thompson (GBR)	1:05:08
11th	1991	David Holding (GBR)	47:24	Tanni Grey-Thompson (GBR)	1:00:22
12th	1992	David Holding (GBR)	50:21	Tanni Grey-Thompson (GBR)	59:21
13th	1993	Ivan Newman (GBR)	54:11	Rose Hill (GBR)	58:00
14th	1994	David Holding (GBR)	50:33	Rose Hill (GBR)	1:00:41
15th	1995	Jack McKenna (GBR)	52:16	Tanni Grey-Thompson (GBR)	58:44
16th	1996	David Holding (GBR)	49:17	Tanni Grey-Thompson (GBR)	57:17
17th	1997	David Holding (GBR)	44:22	Tanni Grey-Thompson (GBR)	52:17
18th	1998	Hadj Lahmar (GBR)	53:47	Tanni Grey-Thompson (GBR)	1:10:58
19th	1999	Hadj Lahmar (GBR)	49:57	Tanni Grey-Thompson (GBR)	1:02:32
20th	2000	Kevin Papworth (GBR)	49:18	Sarah Piercey (GBR)	1:13:32
21st	2001	Tushar Patel (GBR)	48:10	Gunilla Wallengren (SWE)	52:59
22nd	2002	Tushar Patel (GBR)	48:46	Gunilla Wallengren (SWE)	57:47
23rd	2003	David Weir (GBR)	45:41	Gunilla Wallengren (SWE)	53:04
24th	2004	Kenny Herriot (GBR)	45:37	Gunilla Wallengren (SWE)	52:14
25th	2005	David Weir (GBR)	42:33	Shelly Woods (GBR)	50:04
26th	2006	Kurt Fearnley (AUS)	42:39	Diane Roy (CAN)	50:33
27th	2007	Ernst van Dyk (RSA)	42:35	Shelly Woods (GBR)	50:33
28th	2008	Josh Cassidy (CAN)	44:10	Diane Roy (CAN)	51:18
29th	2009	David Weir (GBR)	41:34	Amanda McGrory (USA)	49:47
30th	2010	David Weir (GBR)	44:49	Shelly Woods (GBR)	52:59
31st	2011	Josh Cassidy (CAN)	43:57	Shelly Woods (GBR)	50:14
32nd	2012	Josh Cassidy (CAN)	43:18	Jane Egan (GBR)	1:15:00
33rd	2013	David Weir (GBR)	43:06	Shelly Woods (GBR)	54:28
34th	2014	Jordi Madeira (ESP)	43:02	Shelly Woods (GBR)	50:34
35th	2015	David Weir (GBR)	42:46	Shelly Woods (GBR)	53:38
36th	2016	Mark Telford (GBR)	49:02	Claire Lomas (GBR)	
37th	2017	Simon Lawson (GBR)	44:22	Manuela Schär (CHE)	48:44
38th	2018	David Weir (GBR)	41:19	Martyna Snopek (POL)	1:03:44
39th	2019	David Weir (GBR)	43:29	Jade Jones-Hall (GBR)	50:15
	2020	cancelled			
40th	2021	Sean Frame (GBR)	49:52	Shelly Woods (GBR)	57:01
41st	2022	David Weir (GBR)	42:59	Eden Rainbow-Cooper (GBR)	51:27
42nd	2023	Daniel Sidbury (GBR)	42:48	Samantha Kinghorn (GBR)	42:21
43rd	2024	JohnBoy Smith (GBR)	48:59	Jade Jones-Hall (GBR)	58:26
44th	2025	Sean Frame (GBR)	49:24	Mel Nicholls (GBR)	1:05:24
45th	2026	David Weir (GBR)	43:06	Melanie Woods (GBR)	50:19
46th	2027	TBA	TBA	TBA	TBA

== Mayoral partnership ==
For the 2024 instalment of the Great North Run, Brendan Foster and elected mayors across Northern England discussed the formation of an eponymous partnership called The Great North, which would replace the UK Government's recently discontinued levelling-up programme. In May 2025, The Great North was officially established with the Great North Run as its sponsor, with which it shares its branding. The partnership consists of almost all elected mayors in Northern England, including the mayor of Hull and East Yorkshire, the mayor of South Yorkshire, the mayor of York and North Yorkshire, the mayor of West Yorkshire, the mayor of the Liverpool City Region, the mayor of Tees Valley, the mayor of the North East and the mayor of Greater Manchester. It is supported by the UK Government and is chaired by one of the mayors, North East mayor Kim McGuinness since 2025.

== See also ==
- Northeast of England
- Great South Run
