= Douglas Wakiihuri =

Kenyan long-distance runner

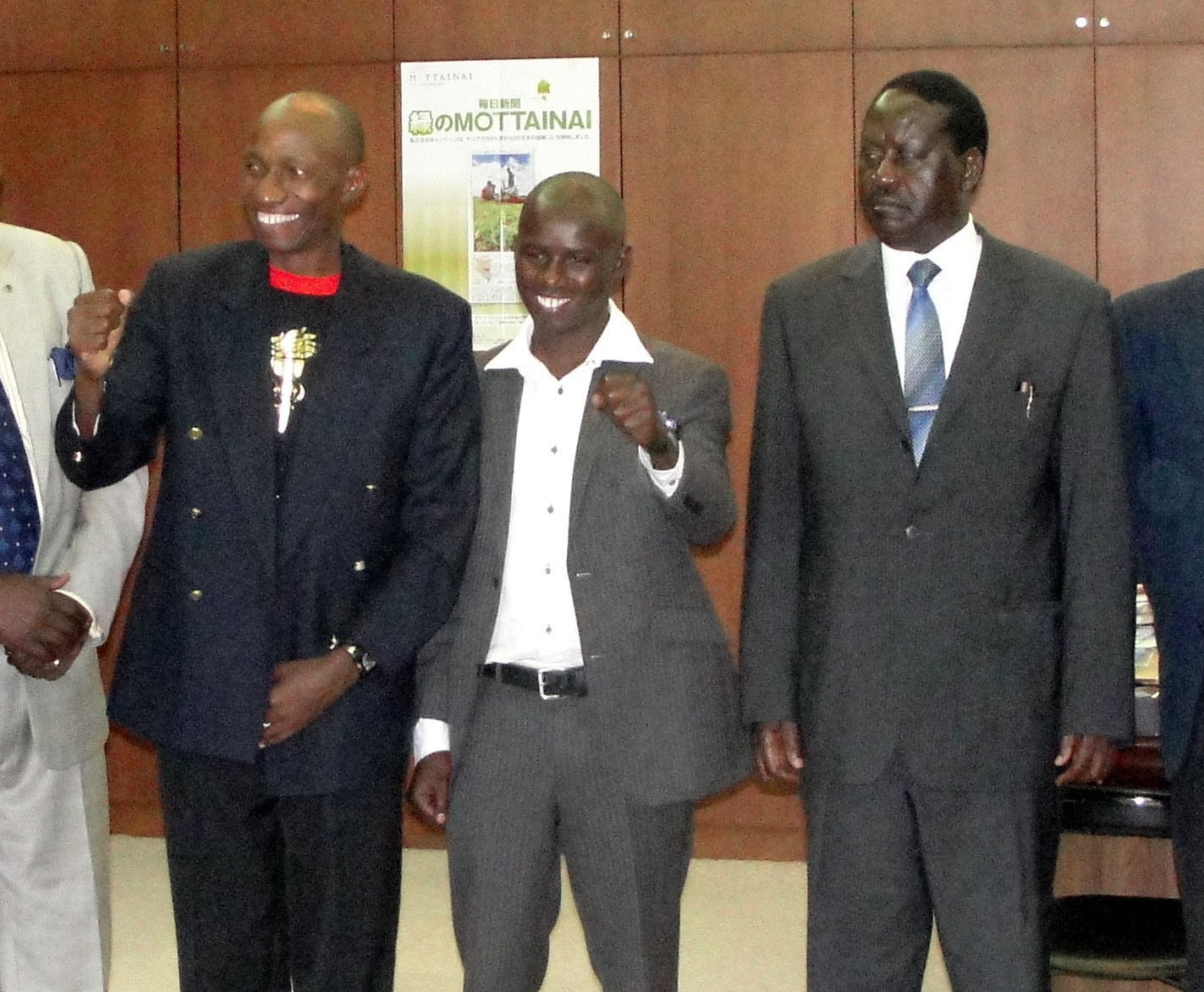
Wakiihuri (on the left) with Samuel Wanjiru (center) and Raila Odinga at the Japanese Embassy in Kenya in March 2011

Douglas Wakììhūri (born September 26, 1963, in Mombasa) is a former Kenyan long-distance runner, who won the gold medal in the marathon at the 1987 World Championships in Athletics in Rome.

No other male Kenyan runner had ever won the marathon at World Championships or Olympic Games until 2007, when Luke Kibet became a world champion. The following year, Wakììhūri won the silver medal at the 1988 Summer Olympics in Seoul, finishing behind Gelindo Bordin.

In 1989 Wakììhūri won the London Marathon. In 1990 he won the New York Marathon. Wakììhūri was famous for wearing white gloves during races. He now runs a marathon fitness center and training school.

== Competitions ==
Year	Competition	Venue	Position	Event	Notes
Representing Kenya
1986	Lake Biwa Marathon	Ōtsu, Japan	6th	Marathon	2:16:26
1987	Beppu-Oita Marathon	Beppu-Ōita, Japan	6th	Marathon	2:13:34
1987	World Championships	Rome, Italy	1st	Marathon	2:11:48
1988	Tokyo Marathon	Tokyo, Japan	7th	Marathon	2:11:57
1988	Olympic Games	Seoul, South Korea	2nd	Marathon	2:10:47
1989	London Marathon	London, United Kingdom	1st	Marathon	2:09:03
1990	Commonwealth Games	Auckland, New Zealand	1st	Marathon	2:10:27
1990	20 km of Brussels	Brussels, Belgium	1st	20 km	57:21
1990	New York City Marathon	New York, United States	1st	Marathon	2:12:39
1991	Boston Marathon	Boston, United States	6th	Marathon	2:13:30
1992	Olympic Games	Barcelona, Spain	36th	Marathon	2:19:38
1995	World Marathon Cup	Athens, Greece	1st	Marathon	2:12:01
