= Jacqueline Gareau =

Canadian marathon runner

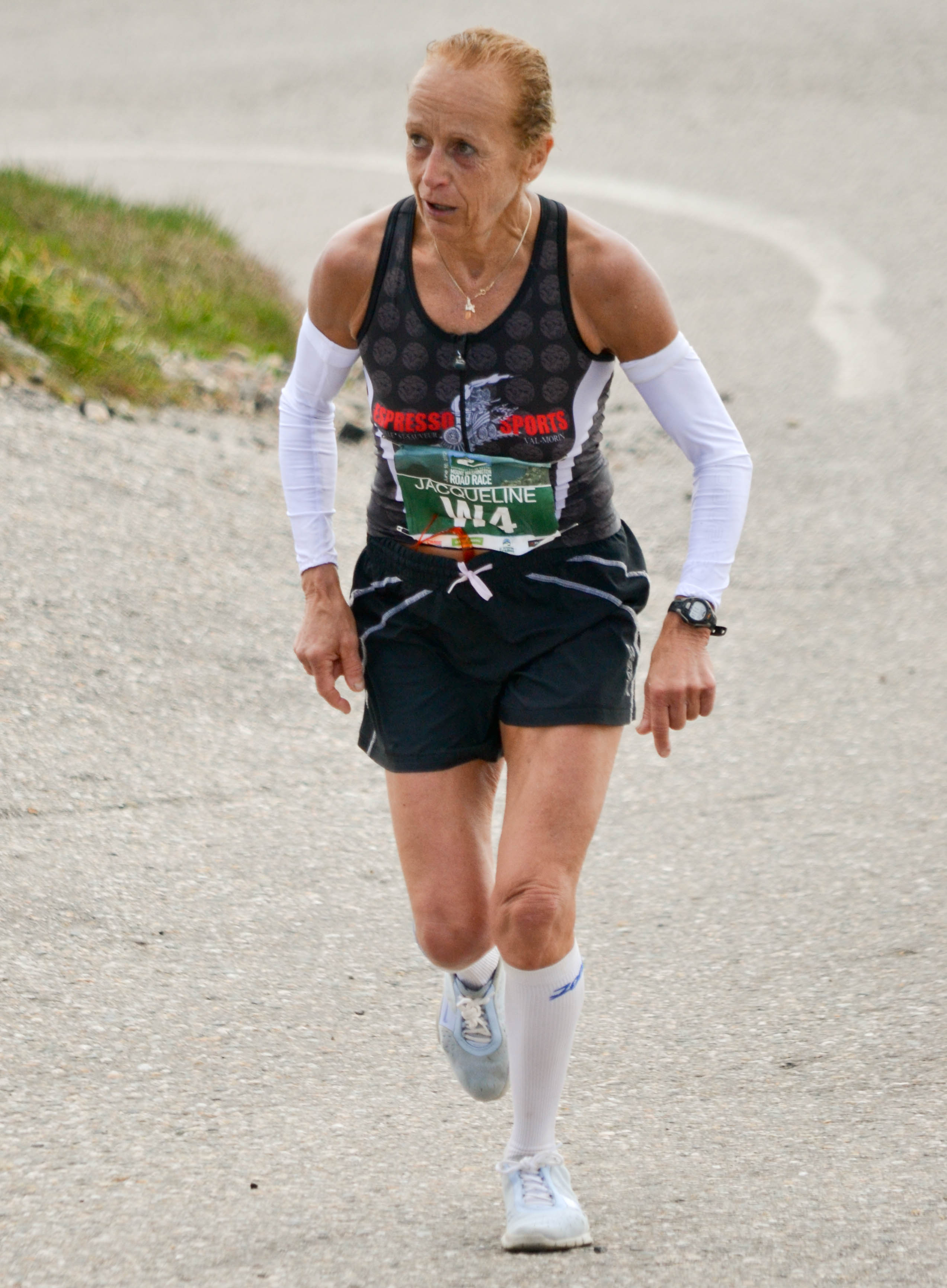
- Gareau in 2012

Personal information
- Full name: Jacqueline Gareau
- Born: March 10, 1953 (age 73) L'Annonciation, Quebec, Canada

Sport
- Country: Canada
- Sport: Marathon

Jacqueline Gareau (born March 10, 1953) is a Canadian runner who won the Boston Marathon on April 21, 1980. Gareau led the women's field for most of the race, only to find another runner, Rosie Ruiz, wearing the traditional victor's laurels when she crossed the finish line. Ruiz was later disqualified after it was determined she had cheated and did not run the entire race. Gareau was awarded the victory in a special ceremony one week later. Her official time for the 1980 marathon, 2:34:28, was the fastest time recorded for a woman in the event's history at the time.

Gareau met Ruiz two years after the marathon as she prepared to run a 10K race in Miami, Florida. The encounter was brief and Ruiz refused (as she continued to do until her death) to concede that she did not win the 1980 marathon.

Gareau served as the Grand Marshal of the 2005 Boston Marathon and was allowed to "break the tape" in a special ceremony. She married her former coach, Montréal banker Gilles Lapierre. She has a son, Yannick Lapierre, who participates in Nordic skiing.

== Achievements ==
| Year | Competition | Venue | Position | Event | Notes |
Representing Canada
| 1978 | Marathon de l'Ile d'Orléans | Île d'Orléans, Quebec, Canada | 1st | Marathon | 2:59:15 |
| 1979 | National Capital Marathon | Ottawa, Ontario, Canada | 1st | Marathon | 2:47:58 |
| 1979 | Marathon International de Montréal (élite) | Montreal, Quebec, Canada | 1st | Marathon | 2:40:56 |
| 1979 | New York City Marathon | New York City, United States | 3rd | Marathon | 2:39:06 |
| 1980 | Boston Marathon | Boston, United States | 1st | Marathon | 2:34:28 |
| 1980 | Tokyo Marathon | Tokyo, Japan | 2nd | Marathon | 2:30:58 |
| 1981 | Boston Marathon | Boston, United States | 5th | Marathon | 2:31:27 |
| 1982 | Boston Marathon | Boston, United States | 2nd | Marathon | 2:36:10 |
| 1983 | Boston Marathon | Boston, United States | 2nd | Marathon | 2:29:28 |
| 1983 | World Championships | Helsinki, Finland | 5th | Marathon | 2:32:35 |
| 1983 | America's Marathon | Chicago, United States | 2nd | Marathon | 2:31:36 |
| 1984 | L.A. International Marathon | Los Angeles, United States | 1st | Marathon | 2:31:57 |
| 1984 | Olympic Games | Los Angeles, United States | — | Marathon | DNF |
| 1987 | Marathon international de Montréal | Montreal, Canada | 1st | Marathon | 2:32:51 |
| 1988 | London Marathon | London, England | 6th | Marathon | 2:36:04 |
| 1988 | Grandma's Marathon | Duluth, United States | 1st | Marathon | 2:43:27 |
