= Athletics at the 1984 Summer Paralympics – Women's marathon 4 =

Women's marathon 4 at the VII Paralympic Games
- Paralympic Athletics
- Competitors: 6 from 6 nations

Medalists
1st place, gold medalist(s)		Jan Randles	Australia
2nd place, silver medalist(s)		Kay McShane	Ireland
3rd place, bronze medalist(s)		S. Norman	United States

The Women's marathon 4 was a wheelchair marathon event in athletics at the 1984 Summer Paralympics. The race was won by Jan Randles.

== Results ==
Place	Athlete	Time
1	Jan Randles (AUS)	2:42:09
2	Kay McShane (IRL)	2:48:22
3	S. Norman (USA)	2:54:01
4	Josie Cichockyj (GBR)	3:01:40
5	Patricia Weston (CAN)	3:08:40
6	M. L. Moprales (MEX)	3:25:39

== See also ==
- Marathon at the Paralympics
