= Dennis Fowles =

Welsh runner (born 1951)

Personal information
- Nationality: British (Welsh)
- Born: 8 April 1951 (age 75)

Sport
- Sport: Athletics
- Event: Marathon
- Club: Cardiff AAC
Medal record
Marathon
World Marathon Majors
Representing Great Britain
Bronze medal – third place	1984 London	Marathon

Dennis Fowles (born 8 April 1951) is a Welsh former runner, who came third at the 1984 London Marathon. He has won the Welsh Championships events in the 5,000 and 10,000 metres.

== Biography ==
Fowles trained at Cardiff Amateur Athletic Club. Fowles began as a middle distance runner. He won the 5,000 metres event at the 1974 and 1981 Welsh National Championships, and the 10,000 metres event at the 1982 Welsh National Championships.

Fowles' first marathon event was at the 1982 Commonwealth Games in Brisbane, where he finished 13th. He also came sixth in the 10,000 metres event at the Games. Fowles finished 14th at the 1983 London Marathon in a time of 2:13:21. Fowles came third at the 1984 London Marathon after overtaking Norwegian Øyvind Dahl in the last kilometre of the race. Fowles' time of 2:12:12 was a Welsh national record. As of 2020, it is the fourth fastest time for a Welsh marathon runner. Fowles was not selected for the 1984 Summer Olympics in Los Angeles. In 1984, he also won the first Cardiff Half Marathon. In 1985, Fowles won the inaugural City of Norwich Half Marathon in a time of 1:05:11.
