= Kay McShane =

Irish Paralympic athlete (died 2019)

Personal information
- Born: 1948/1949
- Died: 20 December 2019 (aged 70)
Medal record
Women's wheelchair racing
Representing Ireland
Paralympic Games
Silver medal – second place	1984 Stoke Mandeville /New York	Marathon 4
Bronze medal – third place	1988 Seoul	Marathon 4
Bronze medal – third place	1988 Seoul	800 m 4
London Marathon
Gold medal – first place	1984 London	Wheelchair
Gold medal – first place	1985 London	Wheelchair
Gold medal – first place	1986 London	Wheelchair

Kay McShane (1948/1949 – 20 December 2019) was an Irish wheelchair athlete.

== Career ==
Her record of three consecutive wins in the 1984–1986 London Marathon women's wheelchair race remained unequaled for nearly 20 years until Francesca Porcellato tied the record in 2005 and then broke it in 2006.

McShane competed in the 1984 and 1988 Summer Paralympics, in events ranging from the 800 metres to the marathon. She took a silver medal in the marathon in 1984, and two bronze medals in the marathon and 800 metres in 1988.

== Life ==
McShane was born in Fermoy and raised on Spike Island in Cork Harbour. She contracted polio as a child, and as a result used a wheelchair for the rest of her life.

She lived in the coastal town of Cobh with her husband Michael White; she worked as a civil servant.

Kay McShane died on 20 December 2019, aged 70, of cancer.

In 2023, the Spike Island Development Company Limited (SIDCL) worked with her family to stage an exhibit of her life and achievements at the island's fortress. Disputes arose between the family and SIDCL over accessibility of the exhibit, as the bus transport from the harbour to the fortress was not wheelchair-accessible. SIDCL said it was unable to fund the needed improvements, and the exhibition was cancelled.
