= Josie Cichockyj =

British wheelchair athlete

Personal information
- Born: 9 December 1964 Huddersfield, West Yorkshire, United Kingdom
- Died: 2 December 2014 (aged 49)
- Education: University of Bolton
- Occupation(s): Wheelchair athlete, coach
- Years active: c. 1984–1997
- Life partner: Sandra Johnston

Sport
- Country: Great Britain
- Sport: Wheelchair racing, Wheelchair basketball
- Disability: Spina bifida
- Team: Manchester Mavericks
- Updated on 9 December 2014

Josie Cichockyj (9 December 1964 – 2 December 2014) was a British wheelchair athlete. Born in Huddersfield, she competed in the London Marathon women's wheelchair race for a number of years, finishing as runner-up to Kay McShane and Karen Davidson, before winning the 1989 race. Josie won further Marathons including the Leeds, Gloucester, Ottawa and Brussels Marathons. Plus several half Marathons including Great North Run and Reading.

== Career ==
Cichockyj took part in the Summer Paralympics, competing in wheelchair racing at the 1984 Games and in wheelchair basketball at the 1988 Games. Josie held every British Track Record from 100m through to 5,000m breaking 28 British Records. The highlight of her track career was breaking the 5,000m World Track record in addition to silver medals at European Track Championships in Belgium and Austria.

Cichockyj was Great Britain Wheelchair Basketball Captain, 1989-1992 and also acted as Vice captain for several years. She competed in the 1988 Paralympics in Seoul, South Korea and the 1996 Paralympics in Atlanta, USA, gaining 6th Position (highest placed British team). She won bronze medals in the 1995 European Championships in Delden, Holland, and the 1997 championships in Madrid, Spain, 1997. Josie competed in World Championships including Sydney, Australia in 1998.

During the time Josie Cichockyj was competing at basketball she also competed in table tennis and became a National Champion and became a ranked tennis player playing on the ATP tour ITF Tennis. She was also a ranked tennis player on the ATP World Wheelchair Tennis Tour

Cichockyj died on 2 December 2014 due to cancer.
