= Allister Hutton =

British

Personal information
- Nationality: British (Scottish)
- Born: 18 July 1954 (age 71)

Sport
- Sport: Athletics
- Event: long-distance
- Club: Edinburgh Southern Harriers

Allister Hutton (born 18 July 1954) is a former elite long-distance runner from Scotland, who won the London Marathon in 1990. He competed in three consecutive Commonwealth Games for Scotland during his career.

== Biography ==
Running for Edinburgh Southern Harriers (now incorporated into Edinburgh AC), Hutton was Scottish National Cross-country champion in 1978 and 1982.

Hutton finished third behind Charlie Spedding in the 10,000 metres event at the 1983 AAA Championships.

He was third in the 1985 London Marathon, completing a British clean sweep behind Steve Jones and Charlie Spedding, and his time of 2:09:16 places him seventh on the UK all-time rankings. He was third again in 1986. Coached by Alan Storey, Hutton won the 1990 race (2:10:10), a clear thirty seconds ahead of the Italian Salvatore Bettiol. By virtue of winning the 1990 race he was classified as the AAA champion and therefore the British marathon champion.

== Achievements ==
Year	Competition	Venue	Position	Event	Notes
Representing United Kingdom and Scotland
1984	Oslo Marathon	Oslo, Norway	2nd	Marathon	2:16:08
1985	London Marathon	London, United Kingdom	3rd	Marathon	2:09:16
1985	Chicago Marathon	Chicago, United States	11th	Marathon	2:12:28
1986	London Marathon	London, United Kingdom	3rd	Marathon	2:12:36
1986	European Championships	Stuttgart, West Germany	—	Marathon	DNF
1986	Chicago Marathon	Chicago, United States	12th	Marathon	2:15:57
1988	London Marathon	London, United Kingdom	6th	Marathon	2:11:42
1989	London Marathon	London, United Kingdom	13th	Marathon	2:12:47
1990	London Marathon	London, United Kingdom	1st	Marathon	2:10:10
