= Pat Petersen =

American long-distance runner (1959–2015)

Personal information
- Nationality: American
- Born: December 3, 1959 Rockville Centre, New York
- Died: May 31, 2015 (aged 55)

Sport
- Sport: Track, long-distance running
- Event(s): 5,000 meters, 10,000 meters, marathon
- College team: Farmingdale State College; Manhattan College

Achievements and titles
- Personal best(s): 10,000 meters: 28:19.3; Marathon: 2:10:04 (National Record)

Patrick Petersen (December 3, 1959 – May 31, 2015) was an American long-distance runner who once held the American record for the marathon, when he ran 2:10:04 at the 1989 London Marathon. It was a record that stood for 9 years, until it was finally broken in 1999 by Khalid Khannouchi's world-record run of 2:05:42 in that year's Chicago Marathon.

== Running career ==
=== High school ===
Petersen attended Islip High School until he graduated in 1977. He competed in cross country and track in high school, and was described as a competitive runner but had no extraordinary results as a high-schooler. From his earliest years of running he was identified as having an unusual running form.

=== Collegiate ===
Petersen first attended Farmingdale State College for two years, and then transferred to Manhattan College, where he graduated in 1981. At the time, Manhattan College had one of the most competitive collegiate distance running programs in the United States, and when Petersen transferred, the team had Bill Krohn.

=== Post-collegiate ===
Petersen initially intended on quitting running after college, but was offered a part-time position at Super Runners shop in Long Island, which was owned by the winner of the 1970 New York City Marathon, Gary Muhrcke. He ran for Warren Street Social and for a time was sponsored by Adidas. In 1991 he collapsed in the middle of a workout in Central Park and was subsequently diagnosed with a heart irregularity, which ultimately ended his competitive running career. He married Bea Huste-Petersen, also a marathoner, and had four children. They both started a foundation for autism called the EJ Autism Foundation.

He died as a result of pancreatic cancer in May 2015, at the age of 55.

== Achievements ==
Year	Competition	Venue	Position	Event	Notes
1983	New York City Marathon	New York City, United States	12th	Marathon	2:12:06
1984	New York City Marathon	New York City, United States	4th	Marathon	2:16:35
1985	London Marathon	London, England	6th	Marathon	2:11:23
1985	New York City Marathon	New York City, United States	3rd	Marathon	2:12:59
1986	London Marathon	London, England	4th	Marathon	2:12:56
1987	London Marathon	London, England	12th	Marathon	2:12:42
1987	New York City Marathon	New York City, United States	4th	Marathon	2:12:03
1989	London Marathon	London, England	7th	Marathon	2:10:04 NR
1989	New York City Marathon	New York City, United States	10th	Marathon	2:14:02

Source: Association of Road Racing Statisticians (ARRS) profile: Pat Petersen.
