= Kevin Forster =

English long-distance runner

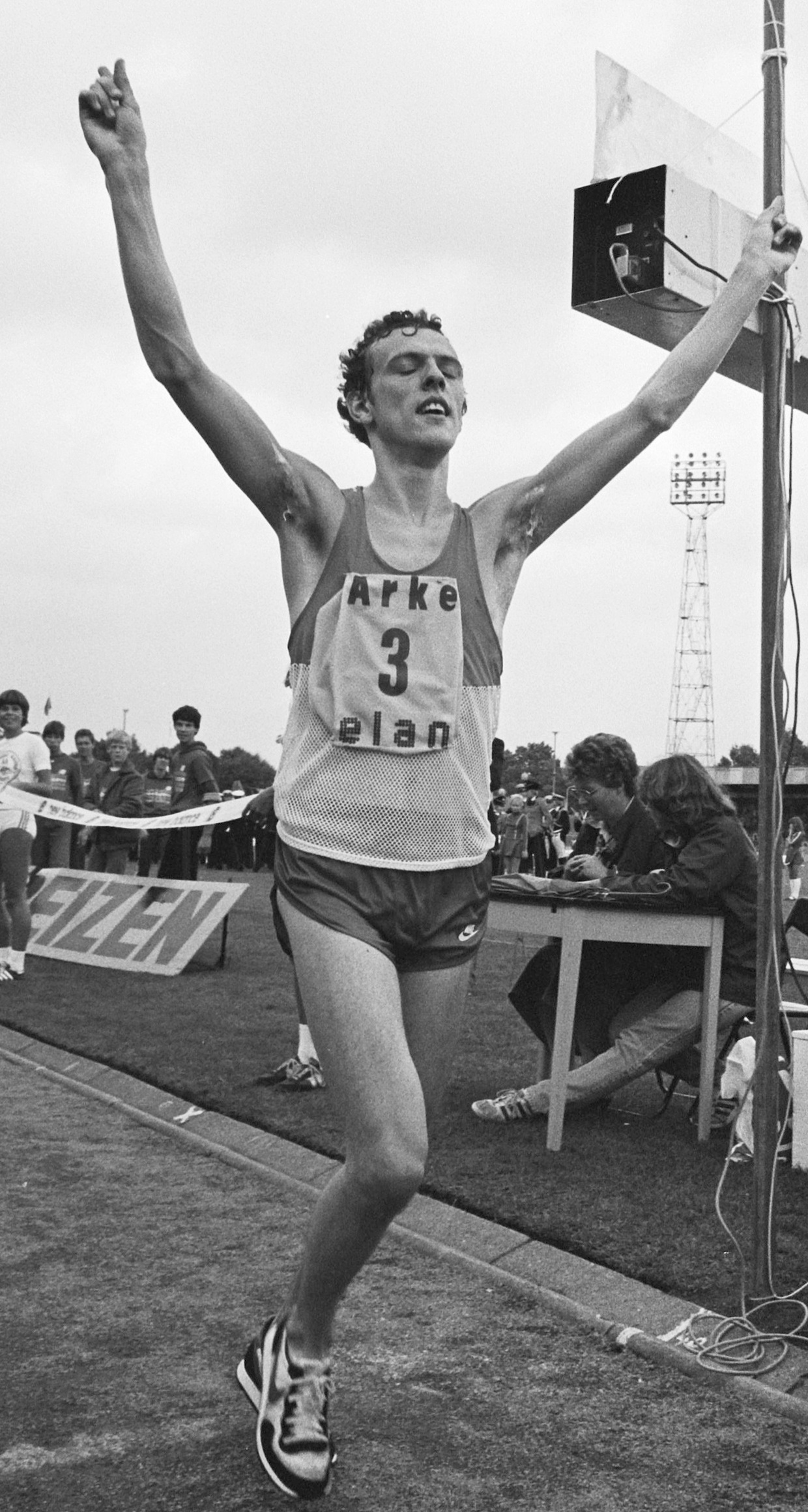
- Kevin Forster winning the Enschede Marathon in 1983

Personal information
- Born: 27 September 1958 (age 68) Stockton-on-Tees, England
- Height: 178 cm (5 ft 10 in)
- Weight: 61 kg (134 lb)

Sport
- Sport: Athletics
- Event: Long-distance running
- Club: Valli Harriers

Kevin John Forster (born 27 September 1958) is a male retired long-distance runner from England. He competed at the 1988 Summer Olympics.

== Biography ==
Forster represented Great Britain and finished 33rd in the marathon at the 1988 Olympic Games in Seoul, and was the fastest English marathon runner of 1988.

Forster won the Enschede Marathon, the Toronto Marathon and the Stockholm Marathon during his career. He was also a member of the England Cross Country teams competing in the World Cross Country Championships through the 1980s, winning silver team medals in 1982 (Rome) and 1987 (Warsaw). Forster won an individual silver medal in the 1987 European Club championships (Clusone, Milan).

He represented England in the marathon event, at the 1986 Commonwealth Games in Edinburgh, Scotland.

Forster won two silver medals from the London Marathon (1984, 2:11:41 and 1988, 2:10:52) and as the highest placed British athlete in 1988 was considered the British marathon champion.

== Competition record ==
Year	Competition	Venue	Position	Event	Notes
Representing United Kingdom & England
1983	The Morpeth	Morpeth, England	1st	22.7 km	1:08:24
1983	Enschede Marathon	Enschede, Netherlands	1st	Marathon	2:14:19
1986	Commonwealth Games	Edinburgh, Scotland	8th	Marathon	2:16:36
1987	Reading Half Marathon	Reading, England	1st	Half Marathon	1:02:07
1987	Stockholm Marathon	Stockholm, Sweden	1st	Marathon	2:13:52
1988	Olympic Games	Seoul, South Korea	33rd	Marathon	2:20:45
