= Angie Hulley =

British long-distance runner

Angie Hulley née Pain
Personal information
- Nationality: British (English)
- Born: 8 February 1962 (age 64) Bromley, Greater London, England
- Height: 162 cm (5 ft 4 in)
- Weight: 51 kg (112 lb)

Sport
- Sport: Athletics
- Event: long-distance
- Club: Leeds City AC
Medal record
Athletics
Representing England
Commonwealth Games
Bronze medal – third place	1990 Auckland	marathon

Angela Joyce "Angie" Hulley (née Pain, born 8 February 1962) is an English retired female long-distance runner. Representing Great Britain, she ran a personal best of 2:30:51, to finish 10th in the marathon at the 1988 Seoul Olympics. Representing England, she won a bronze medal in the marathon at the 1990 Commonwealth Games.

== Biography ==
Born Angela Pain in Bromley, Greater London, she finished sixth for England in the marathon at the 1986 Commonwealth Games in Edinburgh in 2:37:57. A year later, she ran 2:34:47 for eighth at the 1987 London Marathon and was selected for the 1987 World Championships in Rome, where she finished 11th (and first Briton) in 2:38:12. The British trial race for the Seoul Olympics was the 1988 London Marathon on 17 April. With the top two British finishers assured of selection, she was the fourth British athlete, after Ann Ford, Susan Tooby and Sue Crehan, finishing eighth overall in 2:36:11. The third athlete selected to join Ford and Tooby in Seoul was Priscilla Welch, who decided to miss the London trial race and run the Boston Marathon the following day instead. In Boston, Welch ran faster than all the British women in London. In August 1988, both Ford and Welch withdrew from the Olympic team due to injury and an Olympic place was offered to Veronique Marot, who declined it due to injury. The place was then offered to Paula Fudge, who also turned it down. Finally, only a few weeks before the Olympic marathon on 23 September, Sue Crehan and Hulley (then Pain), were both selected to join Tooby in the British Olympic team. In Seoul, she ran her best ever marathon, running 2:30:51 for 10th place. As in Edinburgh (Commonwealths) and Rome (Worlds), she was once again the top British finisher.

Pain finished second behind Jill Hunter in the 10,000 metres event at the 1989 AAA Championships.

At the 1989 IAAF World Cross Country Championships, she finished 13th. In January 1990, she again was the top British athlete in the marathon when winning a bronze medal for England at the Commonwealth Games in Auckland in 2:36:35, behind the Australian pair of Lisa Martin and Tani Ruckle. At the 1990 European Championships in Split, now competing as Angie Hulley, she finished 15th in the 10,000 metres in 33:06.09. She then finished second at the 1991 Pittsburgh Marathon in 2:45:46 and 38th at the 1993 World Marathon Cup in San Sebastián in 2:43:38.

She also represented England in the 10,000 metres event, at the 1994 Commonwealth Games in Victoria, British Columbia, Canada. At the 1996 British Olympic trials in June, she was second in the 10,000 metres but failed to run the qualifying time for Atlanta. In September 1996, she finished 10th in the World Mountain Running Trophy.

== Achievements ==
Year	Competition	Venue	Position	Event	Notes
Representing Great Britain / England
1984	London Marathon	London, United Kingdom	22nd	Marathon	2:47:45
1985	London Marathon	London, United Kingdom	18th	Marathon	2:45:58
1985	Glasgow Marathon	Glasgow, United Kingdom	1st	Marathon	2:37:06
1985	Tokyo International Women's Marathon	Tokyo, Japan	10th	Marathon	2:42:28
1986	London Marathon	London, United Kingdom	11th	Marathon	2:41:12
1986	Commonwealth Games	Edinburgh, United Kingdom	6th	Marathon	2:37:57
1987	London Marathon	London, United Kingdom	8th	Marathon	2:34:47
1987	World Championships	Rome, Italy	11th	Marathon	2:38:12
1988	Houston Marathon	Houston, United States	3rd	Marathon	2:36:21
1988	London Marathon	London, United Kingdom	8th	Marathon	2:36:11
1988	Olympic Games	Seoul, South Korea	10th	Marathon	2:30:51
1989	World Cross Country Championships	Stavanger, Norway	13th	6 km	23:15
1989	London Marathon	London, United Kingdom	7th	Marathon	2:31:06
1990	Commonwealth Games	Auckland, New Zealand	3rd	Marathon	2:36:35
1990	European Championships	Split, Yugoslavia	15th	10,000 m	33:06.09
1991	Pittsburgh Marathon	Pittsburgh, United States	2nd	Marathon	2:45:46
1992	World Cross Country Championships	Boston, United States	46th	6.4 km	22:26
1993	World Marathon Cup	San Sebastián, Spain	38th	Marathon	2:43:38
1994	Commonwealth Games	Victoria, Canada	10th	10,000 m	33:45.04
1995	World Cross Country Championships	Durham, England	78th	6.5 km	22:07
1996	World Cross Country Championships	Cape Town, South Africa	58th	6.4 km	21:58
