= Charlie Spedding =

English former long-distance runner

Personal information
- Nationality: British (English)
- Born: 19 May 1952 (age 74) Bishop Auckland, County Durham, England
- Height: 173 cm (5 ft 8 in)
- Weight: 63 kg (139 lb)

Sport
- Sport: Athletics
- Event: long-distance/marathon
- Club: Valli Harriers

Charles Spedding (born 19 May 1952) is an English former long-distance runner who competed at the 1984 Summer Olympics and the 1988 Summer Olympics.

== Biography ==
Spedding finished third behind Brendan Foster in the 5,000 metres event at the 1976 AAA Championships and was third behind Julian Goater in the 1982 AAA Championships.

Spedding was fourth in the 10,000 metres representing England, at the 1982 Commonwealth Games in Brisbane, Australia. and became the British 5,000 metres champion after winning the British AAA Championships title at the 1983 AAA Championships, in a time of 28:08.12. His first marathon was the Houston Marathon in 1984, which he won by "the thickness of a vest".

Spedding followed this by winning the London Marathon in 1984 and the bronze medal for Great Britain in the marathon at the 1984 Summer Olympics held in Los Angeles, United States, finishing just 2 seconds behind silver medallist John Treacy. Although it was the first British Olympic marathon medal for 20 years, and the last won by Britain (male or female), the performance was one of 16 British medals in athletics that year, and it possibly did not get the recognition it deserved.

In 1985 he set a PB and English Marathon record of 2:08.33 (which stood until 2014) when he finished second behind Steve Jones in the London Marathon. As of August 2024, he is the seventh fastest British marathon runner of all time. He represented England in the marathon, at the 1986 Commonwealth Games in Edinburgh, Scotland.

In 1987, he finished 8th in the London Marathon in 2:10.32. He also competed at the 1988 Summer Olympics in Seoul, South Korea, finishing 6th.

== Post athletics ==
Spedding was a pharmacist by profession and worked in Ferryhill, County Durham. He is a real ale enthusiast and in 1976 co-founded the Durham branch of CAMRA. In September 2009, he published an autobiography of his running career called From Last to First.

He was awarded an Honorary Fellowship from the University of Sunderland in 2012.

In November 2019 he published a book Stop Feeding Us Lies: How Health and Happiness Come to Those Who Seek the Truth which examines dietary recommendations and lifestyle approaches which he analyses as being causes of high levels of obesity, type 2 diabetes and other illnesses.

== Achievements ==
Year	Competition	Venue	Position	Event	Notes
Representing Great Britain
1984	Houston Marathon	Houston, United States	1st	Marathon	2:11:54
1984	London Marathon	London, United Kingdom	1st	Marathon	2:09:57
1984	Olympic Games	Los Angeles, United States	3rd	Marathon	2:09:58
1985	London Marathon	London, United Kingdom	2nd	Marathon	2:08:33
1986	Chicago Marathon	Chicago, United States	3rd	Marathon	2:10:13
1987	London Marathon	London, United Kingdom	8th	Marathon	2:10:32
1988	London Marathon	London, United Kingdom	10th	Marathon	2:12:28
1988	Olympic Games	Seoul, South Korea	6th	Marathon	2:12:19
