= Kevin Breen =

Irish paralympic athlete

Kevin Breen is a former Irish wheelchair athlete. He won the second London Marathon men's wheelchair race in 1984, defeating second-place winner Mick Karaphillides, whose wheelchair broke during the race, and the previous champion Gordon Perry. In winning, he broke the previous course record by nearly one hour, setting a new record of 2:38:40. He also competed in athletics at the Summer Paralympic Games in 1984, 1988, and 1992.
