= Véronique Marot =

British marathon runner (born 1955)

Personal information
- Nationality: British (English)
- Born: 16 September 1955 (age 70) Compiègne, Oise, France
- Height: 168 cm (5 ft 6 in)
- Weight: 52 kg (115 lb)

Sport
- Sport: Athletics
- Event: long distance
- Club: Leeds City AC

Marie-Véronique Antoinette Colette Jeannine Marot (English: /mɑːˈroʊ/ mah-ROH, French: [veʁɔnik maʁo]; born 16 September 1955) is a French-born British marathon runner. She twice broke the British record for the marathon, with 2:28:04 at the 1985 Chicago Marathon and 2:25:56 when winning the 1989 London Marathon. The latter time stood as the UK record for 13 years. She is also a three-time winner of the Houston Marathon and represented Great Britain at the 1992 Barcelona Olympics.

== Biography ==
Marot was born in Compiègne, France. She moved to England in 1976 to study at York University and became a British citizen in 1983. Early in her running career, Marot competed in several fell races. In 1979, she unofficially completed the Ennerdale Fell Race before women were allowed to take part, to the consternation of the race organiser. The next year, women were allowed to compete over the full course.

Marot first ran under three hours for the marathon with a time of 2:55:38 at the 1980 Barnsley Marathon. At the inaugural London Marathon in 1981, she finished ninth, improving her best to 2:46:51. Marot then finished third behind Leslie Watson at the 1981 WAAA Championships.

She further improved with 2:42:14 for 21st at the 1983 London Marathon and 2:36:24 for 7th at the 1983 New York Marathon. She improved again with 2:33:52 for fourth at the 1984 London Marathon, before finishing second at the 1984 New York Marathon with 2:33:58. She broke the British record for the first time when finishing fifth at the 1985 Chicago Marathon, running 2:28:04. A three-time winner of the Houston Marathon, she first won it in 1986, running 2:31:33. Later that year, she failed to finish at the 1986 European Championships in Stuttgart. At the 1987 World Championships in Rome, she finished 22nd in 2:45:02. She earned selection for the 1988 Olympic Games but declined it due to injury.

1989 began with Marot winning the Houston Marathon for the second time, with 2:30:16. Then in April, she won the 1989 London Marathon in 2.25.56, regaining the British record from Priscilla Welch, who had run 2:26:51 in 1987. Marot's time stood as the British record for 13 years until it was broken by Paula Radcliffe in 2002. Marot won the Houston Marathon for the third time in 1991, running 2:30:55, before failing to finish at the 1991 World Championships in Tokyo. In 1992, she finished 16th at the Barcelona Olympics in 2:42:55. She also twice won the Around the Bay Road Race in Ontario (1991 and 1992). In 2003, aged 47, she finished 24th at the London Marathon, running 2:55:01. Marot (as of 2022) ranks fifth on the UK all-time list behind Radcliffe, Jess Piasecki, Mara Yamauchi and Charlotte Purdue.

== Personal life ==
Marot has a son and a daughter with her coach, Brian Scobie.

== Achievements ==
Year	Competition	Venue	Position	Event	Notes
Representing United Kingdom
1978	Barnsley Marathon	Barnsley, United Kingdom	unknown	Marathon	3:55:48
1979	Barnsley Marathon	Barnsley, United Kingdom	15th	Marathon	3:42:13
1980	Barnlsey Marathon	Barnsley, United Kingdom	1st	Marathon	2:55:38
1981	London Marathon	London, United Kingdom	9th	Marathon	2:46:51
1981	Rugby Marathon (AAAs)	Rugby, United Kingdom	3rd	Marathon	2:53:39
1981	Bolton Marathon	Bolton, United Kingdom	1st	Marathon	2:51:52
1982	Sandbach Marathon	Sandbach, United Kingdom	1st	Marathon	2:54:29
1983	London Marathon	London, United Kingdom	21st	Marathon	2:42:14
1983	Bolton Marathon	Bolton, United Kingdom	2nd	Marathon	2:49:51
1983	New York City Marathon	New York, United States	7th	Marathon	2:36:24
1984	Osaka International Ladies Marathon	Osaka, Japan	8th	Marathon	2:38:37
1984	London Marathon	London, United Kingdom	4th	Marathon	2:33:52
1984	New York City Marathon	New York, United States	2nd	Marathon	2:33:58
1985	Reading Half Marathon	Reading, United Kingdom	1st	Half marathon	1:12:56
1985	Houston Marathon	Houston, United States	3rd	Marathon	2:31:16
1985	World Marathon Cup	Hiroshima, Japan	8th	Marathon	2:37:05
1985	London Marathon	London, United Kingdom	9th	Marathon	2:35:12
1985	Bolton Marathon	Bolton, United Kingdom	1st	Marathon	2:42:01
1985	Chicago Marathon	Chicago, United States	5th	Marathon	2:28:04
1986	Houston Marathon	Houston, United States	1st	Marathon	2:31:33
1986	London Marathon	London, United Kingdom	—	Marathon	DNF
1986	European Championships	Stuttgart, West Germany	—	Marathon	DNF
1987	Houston Marathon	Houston, United States	2nd	Marathon	2:35:37
1987	London Marathon	London, United Kingdom	3rd	Marathon	2:30:15
1987	World Championships	Rome, Italy	22nd	Marathon	2:45:02
1987	Tokyo International Women's Marathon	Tokyo, Japan	4th	Marathon	2:31:55
1988	Humber Bridge Marathon	United Kingdom	1st	Marathon	2:38:25
1988	Columbus Marathon	Columbus, Ohio, United States	3rd	Marathon	2:33:36
1989	Houston Marathon	Houston, United States	1st	Marathon	2:30:16
1989	London Marathon	London, United Kingdom	1st	Marathon	2:25:56
1990	New York City Marathon	New York, United States	11th	Marathon	2:38:40
1991	Houston Marathon	Houston, United States	1st	Marathon	2:30:55
1991	World Championships	Tokyo, Japan	—	Marathon	DNF
1992	Olympic Games	Barcelona, Spain	16th	Marathon	2:42:55
2003	London Marathon	London, United Kingdom	24th	Marahon	2:55:01
2005	London Marathon	London, United Kingdom	505th	Marathon	3:29:39
2016	London Marathon	London, United Kingdom	9700th	Marathon	5:02:56

Note: In 1985 Marot ran the London Marathon just 8 days after running in the World Cup Marathon.
