= Karen Davidson (athlete) =

British wheelchair racer

Personal information
- Nationality: British
Medal record
Representing Great Britain
Paralympic Games
Athletics
Gold medal – first place	1984 New York/Stoke Mandeville	Women's shot put A1
Silver medal – second place	1984 New York/Stoke Mandeville	Women's discus A1
Bronze medal – third place	1984 New York/Stoke Mandeville	Women's javelin A1
Swimming
Bronze medal – third place	1984 New York/Stoke Mandeville	Women's 200m individual medley A1

Karen Davidson is a British former wheelchair athlete. Davidson was a force in the London Marathon women's wheelchair race during the mid-1980s. She was the runner-up in 1986, won the race setting new course and British records in 1987, and retained her title in 1988 while setting another British record. She competed in both athletics and swimming at the 1984 Summer Paralympics, taking a gold medal in the shot put A1, silver in discus A1, bronze in javelin A1, and another bronze in the pool in the 200 metre individual medley A1. She participated in athletics again at the 1988 Games, but did not medal. Davidson was a member of Rugby Sport for the Disabled Association.
