= London Marathon =

Annual race held in London, England

Coordinates: 51°28′22″N 00°00′34″E

- Date: April
- Location: London, United Kingdom
- Event type: Road
- Distance: Marathon
- Primary sponsor: TCS
- Established: 1981 (45 years ago)
- Course records: Men: 1:59:30 (Sabastian Sawe, 2026); Women: 2:15:25 (Paula Radcliffe, 2003); Wheelchair men: 1:23:44 (Marcel Hug, 2023); Wheelchair women: 1:38:24 (Catherine Debrunner, 2022)
- Website: www.tcslondonmarathon.com
- 2026 London Marathon

The London Marathon (Note: Also known as the TCS London Marathon for sponsorship reasons) is an annual marathon held in London, England. Founded by athletes Chris Brasher and John Disley in 1981, it is typically held in April, although it moved to October for 2020, 2021, and 2022 due to the COVID-19 pandemic. The largely flat course is set around the River Thames, starting in Blackheath and finishing at The Mall. Hugh Brasher (son of Chris) is the current race director and Nick Bitel its chief executive.

The race has several components: it has a mass race for the public, professional races for men and women long-distance runners, elite-level wheelchair races for men and women, and a 3-mile mini marathon event for under-17 athletes. In 2026, London Marathon Events launched a collaboration with Friday Night Lights, a paid-for 5km run at Battersea Park on the Friday prior to the marathon.

There is a significant charity running aspect to the marathon, with participants helping to raise over £1.4 billion since its founding.

Since 2006, the elite race has been part of the World Marathon Majors, which includes seven of the world's top level marathon races. The London Marathon has seen the marathon world record broken on seven occasions: Khalid Khannouchi broke the men's record in 2002, and Sabastian Sawe notably broke the 2 hours barrier in 2026, while women's records have been broken by Grete Waitz (1983), Ingrid Kristiansen (1985), Paula Radcliffe (2002, 2003, 2005) and Mary Jepkosgei Keitany (2017). The current elite course records are held by Sabastian Sawe (1:59:30 in 2026) and Paula Radcliffe (2:15:25 in 2003). The current wheelchair course records are held by Marcel Hug (1:23:44 in 2023) and Catherine Debrunner (1:38:24 in 2022). The race often has a title sponsorship, it has been branded the "TCS London Marathon" since 2022.

== Editions ==
Edition	Date	Applicants	Accepted	Starters	Finishers	Charity raised (£ millions)	Official charity
1	29 March 1981	20,000	7,747	7,055	6,255		—N/a
2	9 May 1982	90,000	18,059	16,350	15,116		—N/a
3	17 April 1983	60,000	19,735	16,500	15,793		—N/a
4	13 May 1984	70,000	21,142	16,992	15,675		
5	21 April 1985	83,000	22,274	17,500	15,873		
6	20 April 1986	80,000	25,566	19,261	18,067		British Sports Association for the Disabled (autistic)
7	10 May 1987	80,000	28,364	21,485	19,586		Farnham Park Trust
8	17 April 1988	73,000	29,979	22,469	20,932		SportsAid
9	23 April 1989	72,000	31,772	24,452	22,701		The Evelina Family Trust; Special Olympics
10	22 April 1990	73,000	34,882	26,500	25,013		Battle of Britain Appeal; Community Action Trust
11	21 April 1991	79,000	33,485	24,500	23,435		Action on Addiction; Royal Marsden Cancer Research
12	12 April 1992	83,000	34,250	24,500	23,833		Guy's Hospital; Evelina London Children's Hospital; Tuskforce
13	18 April 1993	68,000	35,820	25,000	24,495		St John Ambulance; Snowden Award Scheme
14	17 April 1994	72,000	37,379	26,000	25,242		British Heart Foundation; Childline
15	2 April 1995	79,000	39,097	27,000	25,377		Leonard Cheshire Disability; Cancer Relief Macmillan
16	21 April 1996	68,000	39,173	27,134	26,806		British Heart Foundation; National Asthma Campaign
17	13 April 1997	78,000	39,813	29,500	29,189		British Heart Foundation; NSPCC
18	26 April 1998	96,000	42,228	30,663	29,972		Age Concern; Diana, Princess of Wales Memorial Fund
19	18 April 1999	87,000	43,774	31,582	30,849		Whizz-Kidz; Leukaemia Research
20	16 April 2000	93,000	42,596	32,620	31,698		Mencap
21	22 April 2001	92,000	43,517	31,156	30,318		MS Society
22	14 April 2002	99,000	46,083	33,297	32,950		Outward Bound; FCWL
23	13 April 2003	111,000	45,629	32,746	32,324		Shelter
24	18 April 2004	108,000	45,219	32,746	32,012		Sense; British Heart Foundation
25	17 April 2005	132,000	47,969	35,600	35,300		Help the Hospices
26	23 April 2006	119,000	47,020	33,578	33,250		The Stroke Association; Anthony Nolan
27	22 April 2007	128,000	50,039	36,396	35,729	46.5	WellChild
28	13 April 2008	120,000	48,630	35,037	34,637	46.7	Heart UK; Spinal Injuries Association
29	26 April 2009	155,000	49,995	35,884	35,404	47.2	The Children's Trust
30	25 April 2010	163,000	51,378	36,956	36,666	50.6	CLIC Sargent
31	17 April 2011	163,926	50,532	35,303	34,872	51.8	Oxfam
32	22 April 2012	170,150	50,200	37,227	36,812	52.8	Prostate Cancer Charity (now Prostate Cancer UK) (Breast Cancer Care)
33	21 April 2013	167,449	48,323	34,631	34,381	53.0	YouthNet; Age UK
34	13 April 2014	169,682	49,872	36,337	35,977	53.2	Anthony Nolan
35	26 April 2015	172,888	51,696	38,020	37,793	54.1	Cancer Research UK
36	24 April 2016	247,069	53,152	39,523	39,140	59.4	NSPCC
37	23 April 2017	253,930	53,229	40,048	39,487	61.5	Heads Together
38	22 April 2018	386,050	54,685	40,926	40,220	63.7	Teenage Cancer Trust
39	28 April 2019	414,168	56,398	42,906	42,549	66.4	Dementia Revolution
40	4 October 2020	457,861	77	77	61		Mencap
41	3 October 2021			36,401	35,596		Macmillan
42	2 October 2022	350,000		42,000	40,619		British Heart Foundation
43	23 April 2023		49,675	49,272	43,965	63.0	Great Ormond Street Hospital
44	21 April 2024	578,304	65,725	54,218	53,000	67.0	Samaritans
45	27 April 2025	840,318		57,449	56,640	87.3	Pancreatic Cancer UK
46	26 April 2026	1,133,813		60,512	59,830		Marie Curie

- All information from official website.

NOTE: The 2020 race was restricted to elite athletes in able-bodied (30 for each sex) and invited wheelchair athletes.

== History ==
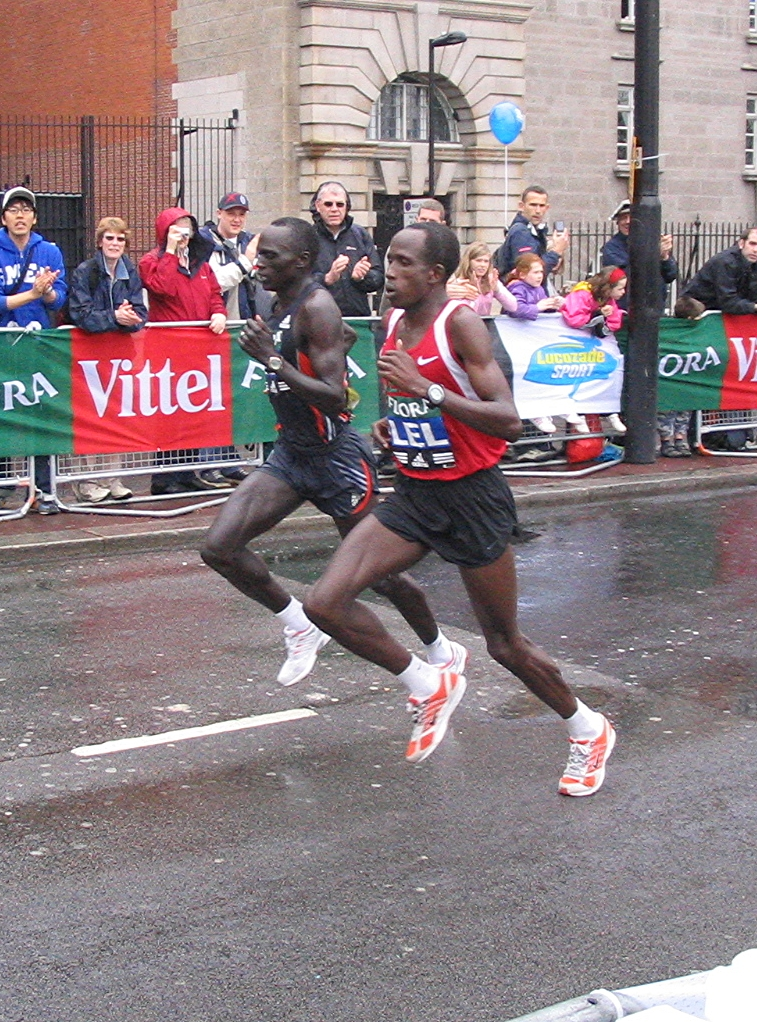
2006 winner Felix Limo (left) and 2005, 2007 & 2008 winner Martin Lel (right)

The London Marathon was not the first long-distance running event held in the city, which has a long history of marathon events. The Polytechnic Marathon (also known as the Poly) was first held in 1909.

The current London Marathon was founded in 1981 by Olympic champion and journalist Chris Brasher and athlete John Disley. Shortly after completing the New York City Marathon in November 1979 Brasher wrote an article for The Observer newspaper which began:

To believe this story you must believe that the human race be one joyous family, working together, laughing together, achieving the impossible. Last Sunday, in one of the most trouble-stricken cities in the world, 11,532 men and women from 40 countries in the world, assisted by over a million black, white and yellow people, laughed, cheered and suffered during the greatest folk festival the world has seen.

The first London Marathon was held on 29 March 1981, more than 20,000 applied to run. 6,747 were accepted and 6,255 crossed the finish line on Constitution Hill. The Marathon's popularity has steadily grown since then. As at 2009, 746,635 people have completed the race since its inception. In 2010, 36,549 people crossed the line, the biggest field since the race began. The first wheelchair marathon race was held in 1983 and the event was credited with reducing the stigma surrounding disabled athletes. In 2013 the IPC Athletics Marathon World Cup was held within the London Marathon featuring athletes of both genders in the T42–T46 and T11–T13 categories. In August 2013 it was announced that the event would be staged in London until 2017 and feature athletes in the T11-T12, T13, T42-T44, T43, T45-46, T51-52 and the T53-54 class.

For many years the London and Polytechnic Marathons competed with each other until, in 1996, the latter folded in due to the popularity of the former.

Following the Boston Marathon bombing, organisers of the 2013 London Marathon undertook a review of their security arrangements, despite no specific threats against the event. A 30-second silence was held before the start of the marathon to show respect and support to those affected by the tragedy.

In April 2025, race organisers announced they will no longer post on X.

== Organisation ==
The race is currently organised by Hugh Brasher, son of Chris, as race director and Nick Bitel as chief executive. Previously David Bedford and Bitel had overseen a period of great change for the race, including amendments to the course in 2005 which saw the cobbled section by the Tower of London replaced with a flat stretch along the Highway.

Dan Tunstall Pedoe was the medical director of the London Marathon for 25 years between the first one in 1981 until 2005. In 2003, Pedoe was shadowed by Sanjay Sharma from St George's Hospital (University of London) who took over the role in its entirety in 2006. Medical cover is provided by 150 doctors. Also assisting were more than 1,500 volunteers of St. John Ambulance, who organise over 50 first aid posts along the route, and three field hospitals at the finish. St John Ambulance also provide a number of healthcare professions for the event, including nurses, paramedics, ambulances with crews. After pressure from Sophie Power and sheRACES, the marathon now allows pregnant and post-partum women to defer their place to a later date of their choosing, thus ensuring they are fully fit and well when they race.

The BBC covers the event, devoting rolling coverage for most of the morning. The theme music associated with this coverage, and with the event itself, is called "Main Titles to The Trap", composed by Ron Goodwin for the film The Trap.

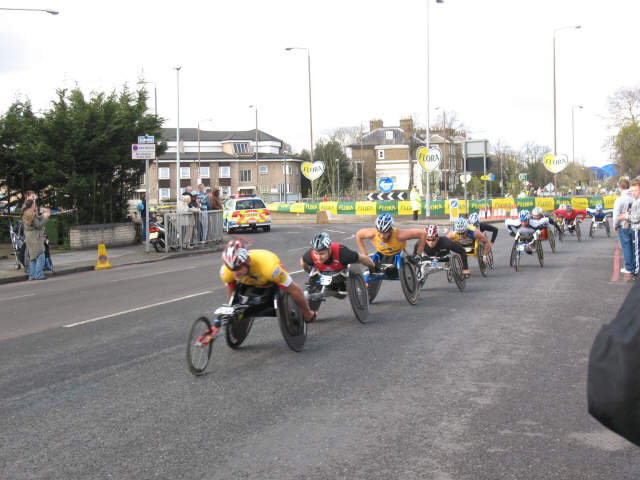
Men's Wheelchair competitors at Shooter's Hill, 13 April 2008

There are three separate groups of starters: Elite Women, Wheelchair (Men and Women), and Elite Men followed by Mass Race.

First mooted in March 2026, in 2027, for "one year only", the marathon will be held on both days of the weekend. Format details are still to be confirmed but could see female elite and good-for-age entrants run on one day, and male elite and good-for-age entrants on the other.

== Course ==
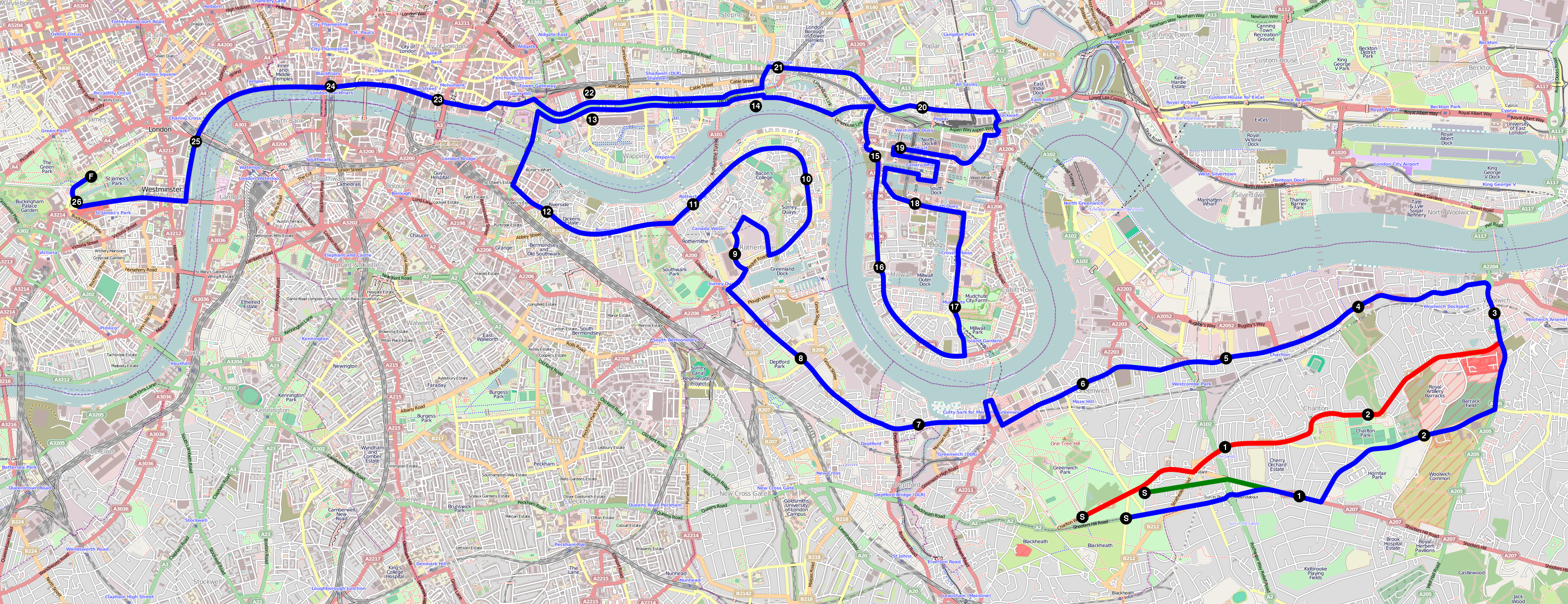
Course map

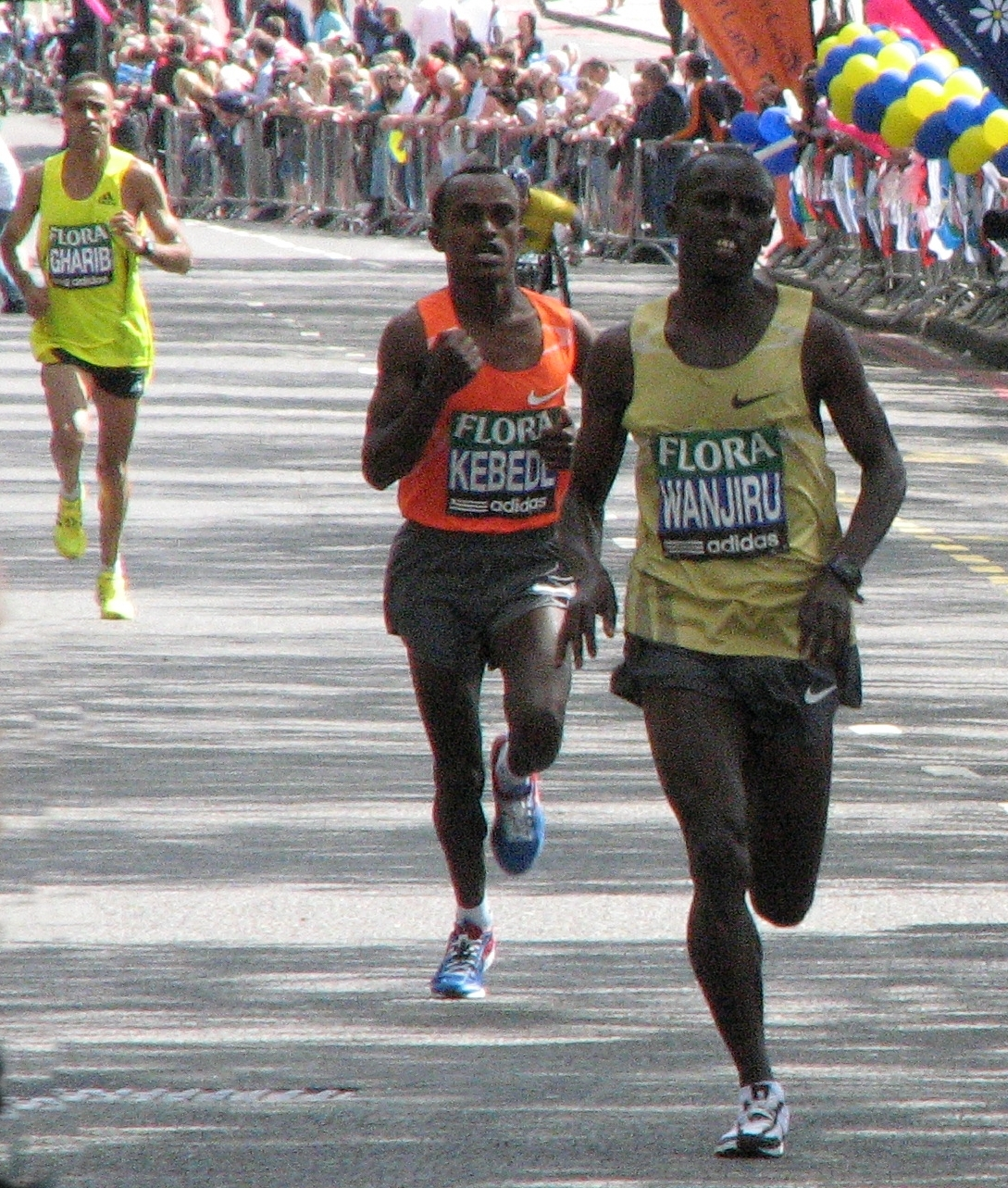
The top three men, Samuel Wanjiru, Tsegay Kebede, and Jaouad Gharib, near the end of the 2009 marathon

The marathon is run over a largely flat course around the River Thames, and spans 42.195 kilometres (26.219 mi). The course gains only 278 feet (85 m) in elevation and is widely regarded as one of the fastest marathon courses in the world.

The route has markers at one mile intervals. Although the race publicity (athlete advice, timing charts and so on) is mile-orientated, the individual timing splits that are available to competitors after the event are kilometre-oriented.

The course begins at three separate points: the 'red start' in southern Greenwich Park on Charlton Way, the 'green start' in St John's Park, and the 'blue start' on Shooter's Hill Road. From these points around Blackheath at 35 m (115 ft) above sea level, south of the River Thames, the route heads east through Charlton. The three courses converge after 4.5 km (2.8 miles) in Woolwich, close to the Royal Artillery Barracks.

As the runners reach the 10 km mark (6.2-mile), they pass by the Old Royal Naval College and head towards Cutty Sark drydocked in Greenwich. Heading next into Deptford and Surrey Quays/Rotherhithe in the Docklands, and out towards Bermondsey, competitors race along Jamaica Road before reaching the half-way point as they cross Tower Bridge. Running east again along The Highway through Wapping, competitors head up towards Limehouse and into Mudchute in the Isle of Dogs via Westferry Road, before heading into Canary Wharf.

As the route leads away from Canary Wharf into Poplar, competitors run west down Poplar High Street back towards Limehouse and on through Commercial Road. They then move back onto The Highway, onto Lower and Upper Thames Streets. Heading into the final leg of the race, competitors pass The Tower of London on Tower Hill. In the penultimate mile along The Embankment, the London Eye comes into view, before the athletes turn right into Birdcage Walk to complete the final 352 m (385 yards), catching the sights of Big Ben and Buckingham Palace, and finishing in The Mall alongside St. James's Palace. This final section of the route formed part of the 2012 Olympic Marathon Course.

Since the first marathon, the course has undergone very few route changes. In the first race, the course took a diversion around Southwark Park before re-joining Jamaica Road on the way to Tower Bridge and was routed through St Katherine Docks past the Tower Hotel, en route to the Tower of London and the cobblestoned stretch of road that in later years was carpeted, to help runners prevent injury on the uneven surface. In 1982, the finishing post was moved from Constitution Hill to Westminster Bridge due to construction works. It remained there for twelve years before moving to its present location at The Mall. In 2005, the route around the Isle of Dogs between 22 and 34 kilometres (14 and 21 mi) was switched from a clockwise to an anti-clockwise direction, and at 35 km (22 miles) the route was diverted to avoid St Katherine Docks and the cobblestoned area near the Tower of London. In 2008, a suspected gas leak at a pub in Wapping diverted the course, but in 2009 the race followed the same path as in 2007.

Since 2012 mile 21 has become a significant cheer zone with Run Dem Crew transforming the stretch of Commercial Road outside the former Limehouse Town Hall into a street party with music and confetti cannons.

Due to the COVID-19 pandemic, the 2020 London Marathon was run on a non-traditional course, consisting of 19.6 laps of length 2.15 kilometres (1.34 mi) around St James's Park, taking in The Mall, Horse Guards Parade, Birdcage Walk and Buckingham Palace. The final circuit was 1,345 metres (0.84 mi) along the Mall, following the finish line of the traditional London Marathon course.

== Results ==
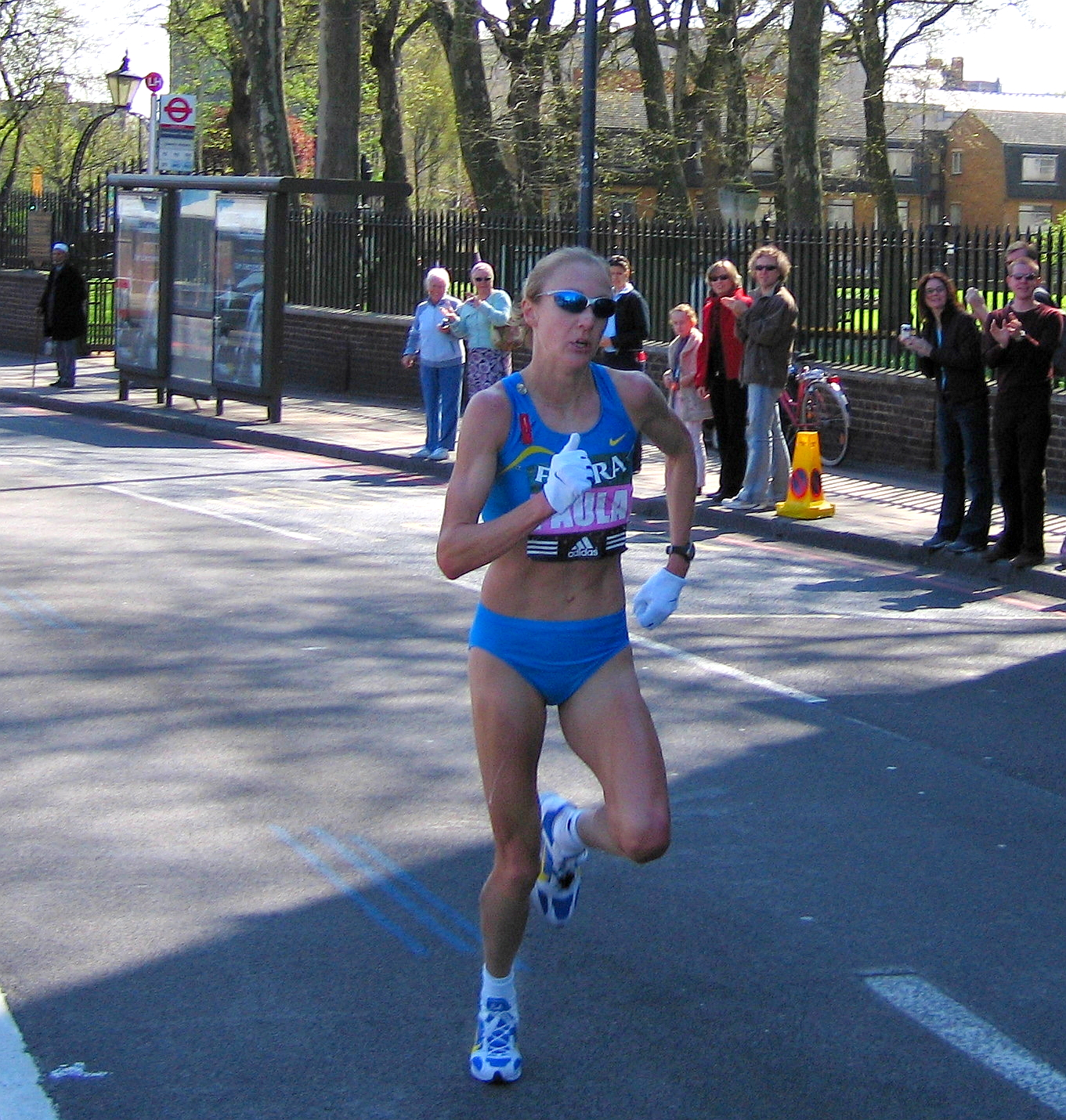
Paula Radcliffe, women's winner of the 2005 race

London is one of the top seven world marathons that form the World Marathon Majors competition with a million prize purse. The inaugural marathon had 7,741 entrants, 6,255 of whom completed the race. The first Men's Elite Race in 1981 was tied between American Dick Beardsley and Norwegian Inge Simonsen, who crossed the finish line holding hands in 2 hours, 11 minutes, 48 seconds. The first Women's Elite Race, also in 1981, was won by Briton Joyce Smith in 2:29:57. In 1983, the first wheelchair races took place. Organized by the British Sports Association for the Disabled (BASD), 19 people competed and 17 finished. Gordon Perry of the United Kingdom won the Men's Wheelchair Race, coming in at 3:20:07, and Denise Smith, also of the UK, won the Women's Wheelchair Race in 4:29:03.

World records for marathon running have been set several times. Sabastian Sawe ran a world record time of 1:59:30 in 2026, almost two minutes faster than the course record set by Kenyan Kelvin Kiptum in 2023. Khalid Khannouchi, representing the United States, set the men's world record in 2:05:38 in 2002.

British runner Paula Radcliffe was the last female athlete to set the women's world record at the London Marathon, in 2:15:25 in the 2003 race (later briefly downgraded to "world best" by the IAAF as it was achieved in a mixed race, but restored to the title of "world Record" shortly thereafter). In 2026 Tigst Assefa of Ethiopia set a world record of 2:15:40 for an all-women's marathon. Previous women's world records were set in 1983, 1985 and 2017 by Grete Waitz, Ingrid Kristiansen and Mary Keitany respectively.

Marcel Hug of Switzerland set the Men's Wheelchair Race course record at 1:26:27 in 2021, and the Women's equivalent was set by Swiss athlete Manuela Schär in 2021, with 1:39:52.

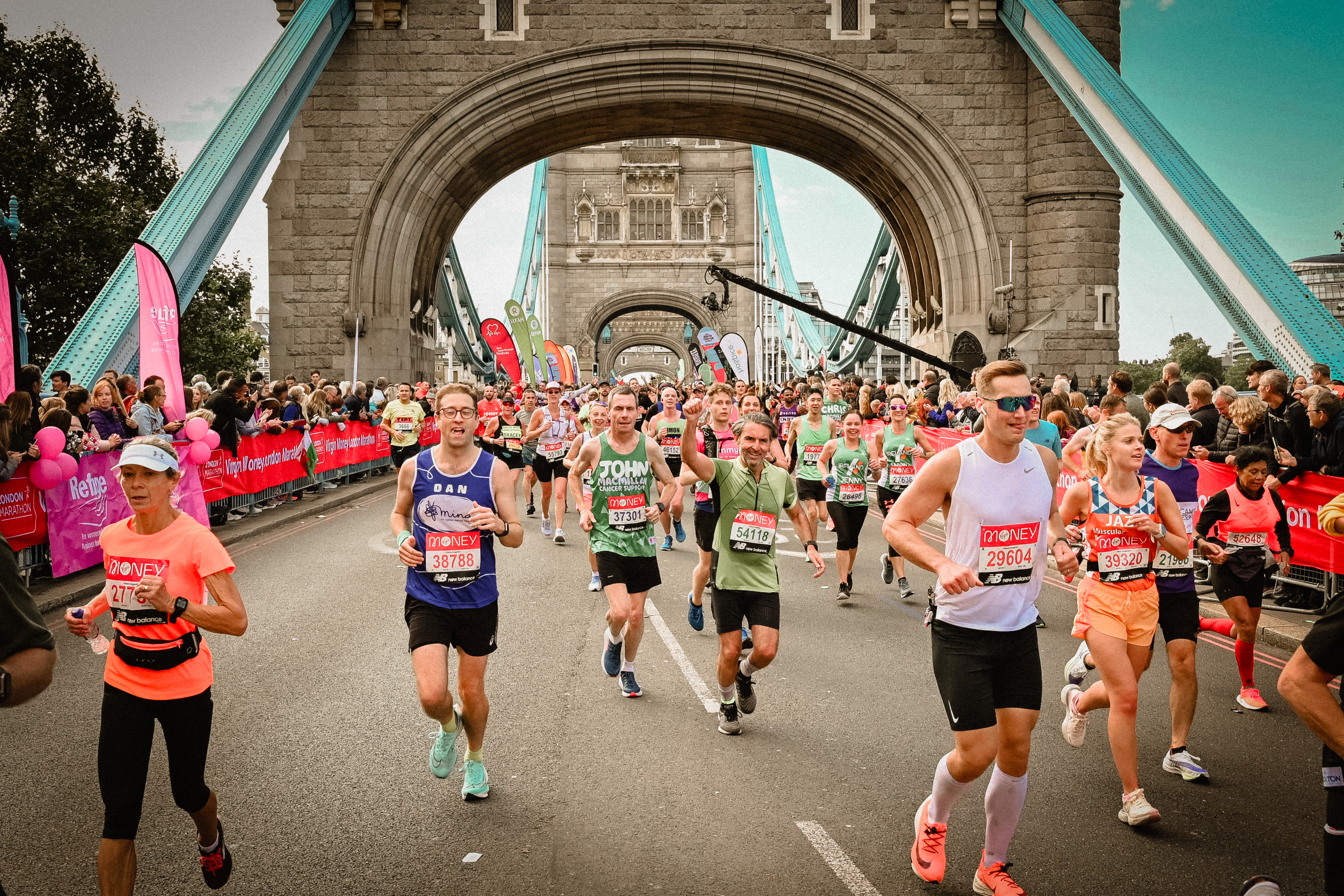

== Amateur runners ==
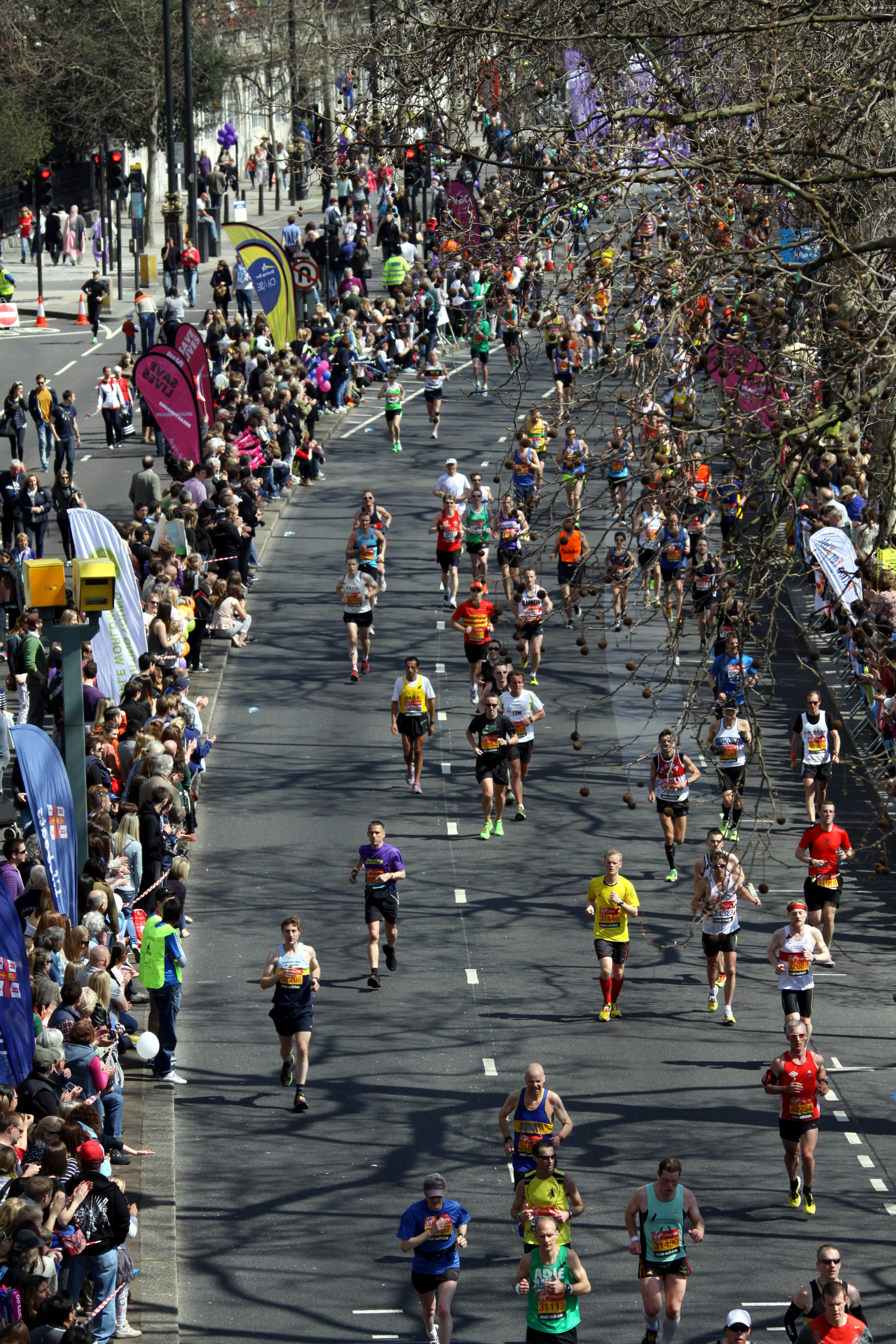
Amateur runners in the race running along Victoria Embankment

The race attracts amateur runners who make up the bulk of the thirty thousand or more participants; commonly running in fancy dress for charity causes.

In 2002, Lloyd Scott completed the marathon wearing a deep sea diving suit that weighed a total of 110 lb (50 kg), with each shoe weighing 24 lb (11 kg); he also set a record for the slowest London Marathon time. On 19 April 2003, former boxer Michael Watson, who had been told he would never be able to walk again after a fight with Chris Eubank, made headlines by finishing the marathon in six days. In 2006, Sir Steve Redgrave (winner of five consecutive Olympic gold medals) set a new Guinness World Record for money raised through a marathon by collecting £1.8 million in sponsorship. This broke the record set the previous year by the founder of the Oasis Trust, Steve Chalke, who had collected over £1.25 million. In 2011, Chalke raised a new record £2.32 million. The £500 that Claire Squires collected before the race increased to over £1 million after she died having collapsed during the 2012 race.

A small number of runners, known as the "Ever Presents", have completed each of the London Marathons since 1981. When the list was first established in 1995, there were 42. After 2019, their number has shrunk to 10. At the running of the 2019 event, the oldest runner was 85-year old Kenneth Jones, whilst the youngest runner was 60-year-old Chris Finill. They are all male.

In 2025, Singaporean marathon record holder Soh Rui Yong set a new Guinness World Record for fastest ever marathon in a suit, running 2:39:57. This broke the previous record of 2:40:53 by Frenchman Emmanuel Bonnier. Soh accomplished this feat while an MBA student at London Business School and is also a graduate of University College London Law School.

== Entry ==
There are multiple ways that runners can enter the London Marathon. The breakdown of places is not publicly shared by the organisation. As of 2023, the available places are generally considered to be distributed approximately as follows:

- Charity (25,000)
- General Ballot (approximately 17,000 (estimated))
- Good For Age Entry (6,000)
- Championship (1,000)
- Affiliated Running Clubs (1,515)
- Celebrity (100)
- Elite (100)

As well as a small number of places distributed directly to overseas ballot, tour operators and those deferred from previous editions.

=== Charity ===
The majority of runners at the London Marathon do so using a Charity Place. To obtain this, they commit to raising a minimum amount for a registered charitable cause. In contrast to the other World Marathon Majors and other international events, London Marathon has a bigger focus on charity running than other similar events. London Marathon participants have helped to raise £1.4 billion since its founding, including £87 million at the 2025 London Marathon which was the highest amount for an annual single-day fund-raising event in the world.

=== General Ballot ===
In recent years, following the growth in popularity of recreational running, it has become increasingly difficult to obtain a place via the general ballot or lottery. In 2024, success in the ballot is estimated to be below 3%. There have been a number of changes in recent years to address the increase in applications (online applications, removal of multi-ballot entry guarantee etc.). The 2027 event ballot received 1,338,544 applications.

=== Good for age ===
The Good-for-Age entry route is the entry route for the majority of "competitive" runners. The aim of the good-for-age category is to provide places for those who achieve a sufficiently fast age-graded time. Due to a greater number of men meeting the Good-for-age criteria, places were capped at 3,000 entries for each gender to ensure an even gender split. This has led to the reduction in the Good for Age mens times in recent years. There is a 10% difference in the marathon World Record pace, but a 26% difference in the London Marathon Good for Age entry times. London Marathon is now harder to enter for men than Boston.

== Mini Marathon ==
The Virgin Money Giving Mini London Marathon is the sister of The London Marathon. The course is the last 3 mi (4.8 km) of the London Marathon and is for under-13s, under-15s and under-17s from all 33 London Boroughs along with 13 teams from ten English regions and three Home Countries: Scotland, Wales and Northern Ireland. There is also a Mini Wheelchair race on the day. The race doubles as the British Athletics 3mile Championships.

== BBC live coverage ==
2019 London Marathon finishers medal

The BBC has broadcast coverage of the London Marathon since its inception in 1981 and has broadcast the race live, and in full, since 1984. Originally hosted out-of-vision by David Coleman, more recently the main presenters on BBC One have been Sue Barker, Jonathan Edwards and Gabby Logan. The highlight presenters on BBC Two have been Jonathan Edwards (2007–12), Sonali Shah (2013), and Helen Skelton (2014–15). The commentators for the Marathon on the BBC were David Coleman, Ron Pickering, Brendan Foster, Paul Dickinson, Steve Cram, Andrew Cotter, Stuart Storey, Paula Radcliffe, Dame Tanni Grey-Thompson, Liz McColgan, and Rob Walker.

=== Theme tune ===
The theme tune used by the BBC every year is from the film score of The Trap, a 1966 film about a Canadian fur trapper, starring Oliver Reed and Rita Tushingham. The music was written by Ron Goodwin and is performed by the Bournemouth Symphony Orchestra.

== Sponsorship and marketing ==
Logo used from 2013 to 2021 under Virgin Money sponsorship

The original sponsors of the London Marathon were Gillette, who sponsored the event from 1981 to 1983. Subsequent sponsors have been Mars (1984–1988), ADT (1989–1992), NutraSweet (1993–1995), and Flora (1996–2009). Virgin Money sponsored the marathon from 2010, after signing a five-year £17m sponsorship deal in 2008. In April 2013, the London Marathon renewed its sponsorship deal with Virgin Money for a further five years and the race changed its name to the Virgin Money London Marathon. In 2021 it was announced that Indian consultancy company Tata Consultancy Services would take over sponsorship of the London Marathon from 2022.

A number of other companies and organisations also use the event for brand identification and marketing, including New Balance, Lucozade Sport, and Fuller's Brewery.

== See also ==
- London Triathlon
