= List of winners of the London Marathon =

The London Marathon, one of the seven World Marathon Majors, has been contested by men and women annually since 29 March 1981. Set over a largely flat course around the River Thames, the marathon is 26.2 miles (42.2 km) in length and generally regarded as a competitive and unpredictable event, and conducive to fast times.

The inaugural marathon had 7,741 entrants, 6,255 of whom completed the race. The first Men's Elite Race was tied between American Dick Beardsley and Norwegian Inge Simonsen, who crossed the finish line holding hands in 2 hours, 11 minutes, 48 seconds. The first Women's Elite Race was won by Briton Joyce Smith in 2:29:57. In 1983, the first wheelchair races took place. Organized by the British Sports Association for the Disabled (BASD), 19 people competed and 17 finished. Gordon Perry of the United Kingdom won the Men's Wheelchair Race, coming in at 3:20:07, and Denise Smith, also of the UK, won the Women's Wheelchair Race in 4:29:03.

Twenty athletes representing the United Kingdom have won the London Marathon a total of forty times. The most recent win by a British athlete was in the 2018 London Marathon, by David Weir in the Men's Wheelchair Race. It was his eighth win in London. Kenya has the second largest number of winning athletes. Seven Kenyan men and seven Kenyan women have been victorious a total of eighteen times, all in the able-bodied category. Eleven men, including those from the wheelchair races, have won the marathon more than once, Weir's six wins being the record. Sixteen women have been winners more than once; Tanni Grey-Thompson won the women's wheelchair race six times between 1992 and 2002.

Course records for the London Marathon have been set ten times in the men's race, seven times in the women's race, sixteen times in the men's wheelchair race, and seventeen times in the women's wheelchair race. World records for marathon running have been set six times considering marks for men and women in mixed sex and women-only races. Khalid Khannouchi, representing the United States, set the men's world record in 2:05:38 in 2002. The following year, British runner Paula Radcliffe set the women's world record in 2:15:25, which also stands as the current course record in the Women's Elite Race. In 2017 Kenyan Mary Keitany ran a women-only race world record of 2:17:01. Eliud Kipchoge of Kenya set the course record at 2:02:37 in 2019 in the Men's Elite Race. Marcel Hug of Switzerland set the Men's Wheelchair Race course record at 1:26:27 in 2021. The course record for the Women's Wheelchair Race was set by Swiss athlete Manuela Schär in 2021, with 1:39:52.

== Elite race – men's winners ==
Year	Athlete	Nationality	Time (h:m:s)	Notes
1981	Dick Beardsley (Tie)	United States	2:11:48	Course record
1981	Inge Simonsen (Tie)	Norway	2:11:48	Course record
1982	Hugh Jones	United Kingdom	2:09:24	Course record
1983	Mike Gratton	United Kingdom	2:09:43	
1984	Charlie Spedding	United Kingdom	2:09:57	
1985	Steve Jones	United Kingdom	2:08:16	Course record
1986	Toshihiko Seko	Japan	2:10:02	
1987	Hiromi Taniguchi	Japan	2:09:50	
1988	Henrik Jørgensen	Denmark	2:10:20	
1989	Douglas Wakiihuri	Kenya	2:09:03	
1990	Allister Hutton	United Kingdom	2:10:10	
1991	Yakov Tolstikov	Soviet Union	2:09:17	
1992	António Pinto	Portugal	2:10:02	
1993	Eamonn Martin	United Kingdom	2:10:50	
1994	Dionicio Cerón (3)	Mexico	2:08:53	
1995	Dionicio Cerón (3)	Mexico	2:08:30	
1996	Dionicio Cerón (3)	Mexico	2:10:00	
1997	António Pinto (2)	Portugal	2:07:55	Course record
1998	Abel Antón	Spain	2:07:57	
1999	Abdelkader El Mouaziz	Morocco	2:07:57	
2000	António Pinto (3)	Portugal	2:06:36	Course record
2001	Abdelkader El Mouaziz (2)	Morocco	2:07:09	
2002	Khalid Khannouchi	United States	2:05:38	World marathon record
2003	Gezahegne Abera	Ethiopia	2:07:56	
2004	Evans Rutto	Kenya	2:06:18	
2005	Martin Lel	Kenya	2:07:35	
2006	Felix Limo	Kenya	2:06:39	
2007	Martin Lel (3)	Kenya	2:07:41	
2008	Martin Lel (3)	Kenya	2:05:15	Course record
2009	Samuel Wanjiru	Kenya	2:05:10	Course record
2010	Tsegaye Kebede	Ethiopia	2:05:19	
2011	Emmanuel Kipchirchir Mutai	Kenya	2:04:40	Course record
2012	Wilson Kipsang Kiprotich	Kenya	2:04:44	
2013	Tsegaye Kebede (2)	Ethiopia	2:06:04	
2014	Wilson Kipsang Kiprotich (2)	Kenya	2:04:29	Course record
2015	Eliud Kipchoge (2)	Kenya	2:04:42	
2016	Eliud Kipchoge (2)	Kenya	2:03:05	Course record
2017	Daniel Wanjiru	Kenya	2:05:48	
2018	Eliud Kipchoge (4)	Kenya	2:04:17	
2019	Eliud Kipchoge (4)	Kenya	2:02:37	Course record
2020	Shura Kitata Tola	Ethiopia	2:05:58	
2021	Sisay Lemma	Ethiopia	2:04:01	
2022	Amos Kipruto	Kenya	2:04:39	
2023	Kelvin Kiptum	Kenya	2:01:25	Course record
2024	Alexander Mutiso	Kenya	2:04:01	
2025	Sabastian Sawe (2)	Kenya	2:02:27	
2026	Sabastian Sawe (2)	Kenya	1:59:30	Course record and men's world record

== Elite race – women's winners ==
Year	Athlete	Nationality	Time (h:m:s)	Notes
1981	Joyce Smith (2)	United Kingdom	2:29:57	Course record
1982	Joyce Smith (2)	United Kingdom	2:29:43	Course record
1983	Grete Waitz	Norway	2:25:29	World marathon record
1984	Ingrid Kristiansen (2)	Norway	2:24:26	Course record
1985	Ingrid Kristiansen (2)	Norway	2:21:06	World marathon record
1986	Grete Waitz (2)	Norway	2:24:54	
1987	Ingrid Kristiansen (4)	Norway	2:22:48	
1988	Ingrid Kristiansen (4)	Norway	2:25:41	
1989	Véronique Marot	United Kingdom	2:25:56	
1990	Wanda Panfil	Poland	2:26:31	
1991	Rosa Mota	Portugal	2:26:14	
1992	Katrin Dörre-Heinig (3)	Germany	2:29:39	
1993	Katrin Dörre-Heinig (3)	Germany	2:27:09	
1994	Katrin Dörre-Heinig (3)	Germany	2:32:34	
1995	Małgorzata Sobańska	Poland	2:27:43	
1996	Liz McColgan	United Kingdom	2:27:54	
1997	Joyce Chepchumba	Kenya	2:26:51	
1998	Catherina McKiernan	Ireland	2:26:26	
1999	Joyce Chepchumba (2)	Kenya	2:23:22	
2000	Tegla Loroupe	Kenya	2:24:33	
2001	Derartu Tulu	Ethiopia	2:23:57	
2002	Paula Radcliffe (2)	United Kingdom	2:18:56	Course record
2003	Paula Radcliffe (2)	United Kingdom	2:15:25	World marathon record (mixed)
2004	Margaret Okayo	Kenya	2:22:35	
2005	Paula Radcliffe (3)	United Kingdom	2:17:42	World marathon record (women-only)
2006	Deena Kastor	United States	2:19:35	
2007	Zhou Chunxiu	China	2:20:38	
2008	Irina Mikitenko (2)	Germany	2:24:14	
2009	Irina Mikitenko (2)	Germany	2:22:11	
2010	Aselefech Mergia	Ethiopia	2:22:38	Initially third but Liliya Shobukhova and Inga Abitova both disqualified retrospectively
2011	Mary Jepkosgei Keitany (2)	Kenya	2:19:19	
2012	Mary Jepkosgei Keitany (2)	Kenya	2:18:37	
2013	Priscah Jeptoo	Kenya	2:20:15	
2014	Edna Kiplagat	Kenya	2:20:21	
2015	Tigist Tufa	Ethiopia	2:23:21	
2016	Jemima Sumgong	Kenya	2:22:58	
2017	Mary Jepkosgei Keitany (3)	Kenya	2:17:01	World marathon record (women-only)
2018	Vivian Cheruiyot	Kenya	2:18:31	
2019	Brigid Kosgei (2)	Kenya	2:18:20	
2020	Brigid Kosgei (2)	Kenya	2:18:58	
2021	Joyciline Jepkosgei	Kenya	2:17:43	
2022	Yalemzerf Yehualaw	Ethiopia	2:17:26	
2023	Sifan Hassan	Netherlands	2:18:33	
2024	Peres Jepchirchir	Kenya	2:16:16	
2025	Tigst Assefa (2)	Ethiopia	2:15:50	World marathon record (women-only)
2026	Tigst Assefa (2)	Ethiopia	2:15:41	World marathon record (women-only)

== Wheelchair race – men's winners ==
Year	Athlete	Nationality	Time (h:m:s)	Notes
1983	Gordon Perry	United Kingdom	3:20:07	Course record
1984	Kevin Breen	Ireland	2:38:40	Course record
1985	Chris Hallam	United Kingdom	2:19:53	Course record
1986	Gerry O'Rourke	Ireland	2:26:38	
1987	Chris Hallam	United Kingdom	2:08:34	Course record; second victory
1988	Ted Vince	Canada	2:01:37	Course record
1989	David Holding	United Kingdom	1:59:31	Course record
1990	Håkan Ericsson	Sweden	1:57:12	Course record
1991	Farid Amarouche	France	1:52:52	Course record
1992	Daniel Wesley	Canada	1:51:42	Course record
1993	George Vandamme	Belgium	1:44:10	Course record
1994	David Holding	United Kingdom	1:46:06	Second victory
1995	Heinz Frei	Switzerland	1:39:14	Course record
1996	David Holding	United Kingdom	1:43:48	Third victory
1997	David Holding	United Kingdom	1:42:15	Fourth victory
1998	Heinz Frei	Switzerland	1:35:18	Course record; second victory
1999	Heinz Frei	Switzerland	1:35:27	Third victory
2000	Kevin Papworth	United Kingdom	1:41:50	
2001	Denis Lemeunier	France	1:42:37	
2002	David Weir	United Kingdom	1:39:44	
2003	Joël Jeannot	France	1:32:02	Course record
2004	Saúl Mendoza	Mexico	1:36:56	
2005	Saúl Mendoza	Mexico	1:35:51	Second victory
2006	David Weir	United Kingdom	1:29:48	Course record; second victory
2007	David Weir	United Kingdom	1:30:51	Third victory
2008	David Weir	United Kingdom	1:33:56	Fourth victory
2009	Kurt Fearnley	Australia	1:28:57	Course record
2010	Josh Cassidy	Canada	1:35:21	
2011	David Weir	United Kingdom	1:30:05	Fifth victory
2012	David Weir	United Kingdom	1:32:26	Sixth victory
2013	Kurt Fearnley	Australia	1:31:29	Second victory
2014	Marcel Hug	Switzerland	1:32:41	
2015	Josh George	United States	1:31:31	
2016	Marcel Hug	Switzerland	1:35:19	Second victory
2017	David Weir	United Kingdom	1:31:06	Seventh victory
2018	David Weir	United Kingdom	1:31:15	Eighth victory
2019	Daniel Romanchuk	United States	1:33:37	
2020	Brent Lakatos	Canada	1:36:04	
2021	Marcel Hug	Switzerland	1:26:27	Course record; third victory
2022	Marcel Hug	Switzerland	1:24:38	Course record; fourth victory
2023	Marcel Hug	Switzerland	1:23:44	Course record; fifth victory
2024	Marcel Hug	Switzerland	1:28:35	Sixth victory
2025	Marcel Hug	Switzerland	1:25:25	Seventh victory
2026	Marcel Hug	Switzerland	1:24:13	Eighth victory

== Wheelchair race – women's winners ==
Year	Athlete	Nationality	Time (h:m:s)	Notes
1983	Denise Smith	United Kingdom	4:29:03	Course record
1984	Kay McShane	Ireland	3:10:04	Course record
1985	Kay McShane	Ireland	2:47:12	Course record; second victory
1986	Kay McShane	Ireland	3:02:40	Third victory
1987	Karen Davidson	United Kingdom	2:45:30	Course record
1988	Karen Davidson	United Kingdom	2:41:45	Course record, second victory
1989	Josie Cichockyj	United Kingdom	3:03:54	
1990	Connie Hansen	Denmark	2:10:25	Course record
1991	Connie Hansen	Denmark	2:04:40	Course record; second victory
1992	Tanni Grey-Thompson	United Kingdom	2:17:23	
1993	Rose Hill	United Kingdom	2:03:05	Course record
1994	Tanni Grey-Thompson	United Kingdom	2:08:26	Second victory
1995	Rose Hill	United Kingdom	2:17:02	Second victory
1996	Tanni Grey-Thompson	United Kingdom	2:00:10	Course record; third victory
1997	Monica Wetterström	Sweden	1:49:09	Course record
1998	Tanni Grey-Thompson	United Kingdom	2:02:01	Fourth victory
1999	Monica Wetterström	Sweden	1:57:38	Second victory
2000	Sarah Piercy	United Kingdom	2:23:30	
2001	Tanni Grey-Thompson	United Kingdom	2:13:55	Fifth victory
2002	Tanni Grey-Thompson	United Kingdom	2:22:51	Sixth victory
2003	Francesca Porcellato	Italy	2:04:21	
2004	Francesca Porcellato	Italy	2:04:58	Second victory
2005	Francesca Porcellato	Italy	1:57:00	Third victory
2006	Francesca Porcellato	Italy	1:59:57	Fourth victory
2007	Shelly Woods	United Kingdom	1:50:40	
2008	Sandra Graf	Switzerland	1:48:04	Course record
2009	Amanda McGrory	United States	1:50:39	
2010	Wakako Tsuchida	Japan	1:52:33	
2011	Amanda McGrory	United States	1:46:31	Course record; second victory
2012	Shelly Woods	United Kingdom	1:49:10	Second victory
2013	Tatyana McFadden	United States	1:46:02	Course record
2014	Tatyana McFadden	United States	1:45:12	Course record; second victory
2015	Tatyana McFadden	United States	1:41:14	Course record; third victory
2016	Tatyana McFadden	United States	1:44:14	Fourth victory
2017	Manuela Schär	Switzerland	1:39:57	Course record
2018	Madison de Rozario	Australia	1:42:58	
2019	Manuela Schär	Switzerland	1:44:09	Second victory
2020	Nikita den Boer	Netherlands	1:40:07	
2021	Manuela Schär	Switzerland	1:39:52	Course record; third victory
2022	Catherine Debrunner	Switzerland	1:38:24	Course record
2023	Madison de Rozario	Australia	1:38:51	Second victory
2024	Catherine Debrunner	Switzerland	1:38:54	Second victory
2025	Catherine Debrunner	Switzerland	1:34:18	Third victory
2026	Catherine Debrunner	Switzerland	1:38:29	Fourth victory

== Victories by nationality ==
Country	Men's race	Women's race	Men's wheelchair	Women's Wheelchair	Total
United Kingdom	6	7	16	15	44
Kenya	19	14	0	0	33
Switzerland	0	0	12	7	19
United States	2	1	2	6	11
Ethiopia	5	6	0	0	11
Norway	1	6	0	0	7
Ireland	0	1	2	3	6
Germany	0	5	0	0	5
Mexico	3	0	2	0	5
Australia	0	0	2	2	4
Canada	0	0	4	0	4
Italy	0	0	0	4	4
Portugal	3	1	0	0	4
Denmark	1	0	0	2	3
France	0	0	3	0	3
Japan	2	0	0	1	3
Sweden	0	0	1	2	3
Netherlands	0	1	0	1	2
Morocco	2	0	0	0	2
Poland	0	2	0	0	2
Belgium	0	0	1	0	1
China	0	1	0	0	1
Soviet Union	1	0	0	0	1
Spain	1	0	0	0	1
