= List of British champions in marathon =

The British marathon athletics champions covers two competitions; the AAA Championships (1925-1982) and the London Marathon from 1983.

Where an international athlete won the AAA Championships or London Marathon the highest ranking UK athlete is considered the National Champion in this list.

== Past winners ==
AAA Championships marathon, men's event only
Year	Men's champion
1925	Sam Ferris
1926	Sam Ferris (2)
1927	Sam Ferris (3)
1928	Harry Payne
1929	Harry Payne (2)
1930	Dunky Wright
1931	Dunky Wright (2)
1932	Donald Robertson
1933	Donald Robertson (2)
1934	Donald Robertson (3)
1935	Albert Norris
1936	Donald Robertson (4)
1937	Donald Robertson (5)
1938	John Beman
1939	Donald Robertson (6)
1946	Squire Yarrow
1947	Jack Holden
1948	Jack Holden (2)
1949	Jack Holden (3)
1950	Jack Holden (4)
1951	Jim Peters (1)
1952	Jim Peters (2)
1953	Jim Peters (3)
1954	Jim Peters (4)
1955	Bill McMinnis
1956	Harry Hicks
1957	Eddie Kirkup
1958	Colin Kemball
1959	Christopher Fleming-Smith
1960	Brian Kilby
1961	Brian Kilby (2)
1962	Brian Kilby (3)
1963	Brian Kilby (4)
1964	Brian Kilby (5)
1965	Bill Adcocks
1966	Graham Taylor
1967	Jim Alder
1968	Tim Johnston
1969	Ron Hill
1970	Don Faircloth
1971	Ron Hill (2)
1972	Ron Hill (3)
1973	Ian Thompson
1974	Bernie Plain
1975	Jeff Norman
1976	Barry Watson
1977	Dave Cannon

AAA Championships/WAAA Championships
Year	AAA Men	Year	WAAA Women
1978	Tony Simmons	1978	Margaret Lockley
1979	Greg Hannon	1979	Joyce Smith
1980	Ian Thompson (2)	1980	Joyce Smith (2)
1981	Hugh Jones	1981	Leslie Watson
1982	Steve Kenyon	1982	Kathryn Binns

London Marathon
Year	Men	Women
British Champion determined by highest placed British athlete
1983	Mike Gratton	Glynis Penny
1984	Charlie Spedding	Priscilla Welch
1985	Steve Jones	Sarah Rowell
1986	Hugh Jones (2)	Ann Ford
1987	Hugh Jones (3)	Priscilla Welch (2)
1988	Kevin Forster	Ann Ford (2)
1989	Tony Milovsorov	Véronique Marot
1990	Allister Hutton	Nicky McCracken
1991	Dave Long	Sally Ellis
1992	Paul Evans	Andrea Wallace
1993	Eamonn Martin	Liz McColgan
1994	Eamonn Martin (2)	Sally Ellis (2)
1995	Paul Evans (2)	Liz McColgan (2)
1996	Paul Evans (3)	Liz McColgan (3)
1997	Paul Evans (4)	Liz McColgan (4)
1998	Mark Hudspith	Liz McColgan (5)
1999	Mark Hudspith (2)	Nicola Scales
2000	Mark Hudspith (3)	Lynne MacDougall
2001	Mark Steinle	Lynne MacDougall (2)
2002	Mark Steinle (2)	Paula Radcliffe
2003	Chris Cariss	Paula Radcliffe (2)
2004	Jon Brown	Tracey Morris
2005	Jon Brown (2)	Paula Radcliffe (3)
2006	Peter Riley	Mara Yamauchi
2007	Dan Robinson	Mara Yamauchi (2)
2008	Dan Robinson (2)	Liz Yelling
2009	Andi Jones	Mara Yamauchi (3)
2010	Andrew Lemoncello	Mara Yamauchi (4)
2011	Lee Merrien	Jo Pavey
2012	Lee Merrien (2)	Claire Hallissey
2013	Derek Hawkins	Susan Partridge
2014	Mo Farah	Amy Whitehead
2015	Scott Overall	Sonia Samuels
2016	Callum Hawkins	Alyson Dixon
2017	Josh Griffiths	Alyson Dixon (2)
2018	Mo Farah (2)	Lily Partridge
2019	Mo Farah (3)	Charlotte Purdue
2020	Not held due to COVID	
2021	Philip Sesemann	Charlotte Purdue (2)
2022	Weynay Ghebresilasie	Rose Harvey
2023	Emile Cairess	Samantha Harrison
2024	Emile Cairess (2)	Mhairi Maclennan
2025	Mahamed Mahamed	Eilish McColgan
2026	Mahamed Mahamed (2)	Eilish McColgan (2)
