= 1995 London Marathon =

15th London Marathon

15th London Marathon
- Venue: London, United Kingdom
- Date: 2 April 1995

Champions
- Men: Dionicio Cerón (2:08:30)
- Women: Małgorzata Sobańska (2:27:43)
- Wheelchair men: Heinz Frei (1:39:14)
- Wheelchair women: Rose Hill (2:17:02)

The 1995 London Marathon was the 15th running of the annual marathon race in London, United Kingdom, which took place on Sunday, 2 April. The elite men's race was won by Mexico's Dionicio Cerón, who took his second straight title in a time of 2:08:30 hours, and the women's race was won by Poland's Małgorzata Sobańska in 2:27:43.

In the wheelchair races, Switzerland's Heinz Frei (1:39:14) and Britain's Rose Hill (2:17:02) won the men's and women's divisions, respectively. Frei's winning time was a course record and the first sub-1:40 finish at the race.

Around 79,000 people applied to enter the race, of whom 39,097 had their applications accepted. Approximately 27,000 started the race, and a total of 25,377 runners finished.

== Results ==
=== Men ===
Position	Athlete	Nationality	Time
1st place, gold medalist(s)	Dionicio Cerón	Mexico	2:08:30
2nd place, silver medalist(s)	Steve Moneghetti	Australia	2:08:33
3rd place, bronze medalist(s)	António Pinto	Portugal	2:08:48
4	Xolile Yawa	South Africa	2:10:22
5	Paul Evans	United Kingdom	2:10:31
6	Joaquim Pinheiro	Portugal	2:10:35
7	Willie Mtolo	South Africa	2:11:35
8	Luigi Di Lello	Italy	2:11:36
9	Johannes Mabitle	South Africa	2:11:39
10	Zachariah Nyambaso	Kenya	2:11:56
11	Mark Hudspith	United Kingdom	2:11:58
12	Peter Whitehead	United Kingdom	2:12:23
13	Eamonn Martin	United Kingdom	2:12:44
14	Bruno Le Stum	France	2:13:40
15	Fabián Roncero	Spain	2:14:36
16	Colin Moore	United Kingdom	2:15:02
17	David Navarro	Spain	2:17:09
18	Wiesław Perszke	Poland	2:17:18
19	Mustapha Nadour	Sweden	2:17:33
20	Anders Szalkai	Sweden	2:17:42
21	Abel Gisemba	Kenya	2:18:29
22	Hassan Sebtaoui	Morocco	2:18:51
23	Christopher Buckley	United Kingdom	2:19:05
24	Luis Soares	France	2:19:38
25	John September	South Africa	2:19:40

=== Women ===
Position	Athlete	Nationality	Time
1st place, gold medalist(s)	Małgorzata Sobańska	Poland	2:27:43
2nd place, silver medalist(s)	Manuela Machado	Portugal	2:27:53
3rd place, bronze medalist(s)	Ritva Lemettinen	Finland	2:28:00
4	Renata Kokowska	Poland	2:30:35
5	Liz McColgan	Scotland	2:31:14
6	Kim Jones	United States	2:31:36
7	Katrin Dörre-Heinig	Germany	2:32:16
8	Nyla Carroll	New Zealand	2:33:19
9	Kerryn McCann	Australia	2:33:23
10	Anita Håkenstad	Norway	2:33:56
11	Serap Aktaş	Turkey	2:36:33
12	Ingmarie Nilsson	Sweden	2:38:46
13	Nelly Glauser	Switzerland	2:39:14
14	Hayley Nash	United Kingdom	2:39:59
15	Pan Jinhong	China	2:40:15
16	Lynn Harding	United Kingdom	2:41:20
17	Julie Barleycorn	England	2:41:37
18	Aurora Pérez	Spain	2:42:02
19	Eryl Davies	United Kingdom	2:44:43
20	Christina Scobey	United States	2:46:24
21	Maria Bak	Germany	2:46:39
22	Elaine Flather	United Kingdom	2:47:11
23	Janice Moorekite	United Kingdom	2:48:06
24	Zoe Lowe	United Kingdom	2:49:28
25	Eleanor Robinson	United Kingdom	2:51:36
—	Cathy O'Brien	United States	DNF
—	Päivi Tikkanen	Finland	DNF

=== Wheelchair men ===
Position	Athlete	Nationality	Time
1st place, gold medalist(s)	Heinz Frei	Switzerland	1:39:14
2nd place, silver medalist(s)	David Holding	United Kingdom	1:47:36
3rd place, bronze medalist(s)	Georg Schrattenecker	Austria	1:47:41
4	Jack McKenna	United Kingdom	1:48:58
5	Ivan Newman	United Kingdom	1:53:18
6	Huub Nelisse	Netherlands	1:53:44
7	Ian Thompson	United Kingdom	1:53:46
8	Chris Madden	United Kingdom	1:53:47
9	Theo Geeve	Netherlands	1:57:37
10	John Van Buren	Netherlands	1:57:38

=== Wheelchair women ===
Position	Athlete	Nationality	Time
1st place, gold medalist(s)	Rose Hill	United Kingdom	2:17:02
2nd place, silver medalist(s)	?	?	
3rd place, bronze medalist(s)	?	?	
