= 1998 London Marathon =

18th London Marathon

18th London Marathon
- Venue: London, United Kingdom
- Date: 26 April 1998

Champions
- Men: Abel Antón (2:07:57)
- Women: Catherina McKiernan (2:26:26)
- Wheelchair men: Heinz Frei (1:35:18)
- Wheelchair women: Tanni Grey (2:02:01)

The 1998 London Marathon was the 18th running of the annual marathon race in London, United Kingdom, which took place on Sunday, 26 April. The elite men's race was won by Spain's Abel Antón in a time of 2:07:57 hours and the women's race was won by Ireland's Catherina McKiernan in 2:26:26.

In the wheelchair races, Switzerland's Heinz Frei (1:35:18) and Britain's Tanni Grey (2:02:01) won the men's and women's divisions, respectively. Frei's winning time was a course record by a margin of nearly four minutes.

Around 96,000 people applied to enter the race, of which 42,228 had their applications accepted and 30,663 started the race. A total of 29,972 runners finished the race.

== Results ==
=== Men ===
Position	Athlete	Nationality	Time
1st place, gold medalist(s)	Abel Antón	Spain	2:07:57
2nd place, silver medalist(s)	Abdelkader El Mouaziz	Morocco	2:08:07
3rd place, bronze medalist(s)	António Pinto	Portugal	2:08:13
4	Julio Rey	Spain	2:08:33
5	Abebe Mekonnen	Ethiopia	2:09:52
6	Róbert Štefko	Slovakia	2:09:54
7	Diego García	Spain	2:10:36
8	Jon Brown	United Kingdom	2:11:11
9	Steve Moneghetti	Australia	2:11:41
10	Kenjiro Jitsui	Japan	2:12:47
11	Vincenzo Modica	Italy	2:13:22
12	Gideon Mutisya	Kenya	2:13:41
13	Antonio Serrano	Spain	2:13:53
14	Masaki Oya	Japan	2:14:11
15	Spyros Andriopoulos	Greece	2:14:13
16	Mark Hudspith	United Kingdom	2:14:20
17	Lawrence Peu	South Africa	2:14:53
18	Sean Quilty	Australia	2:15:19
19	Robert Johnston	New Zealand	2:15:34
20	Harri Hänninen	Finland	2:16:09
—	Josia Thugwane	South Africa	DNF
—	Jerry Lawson	United States	DNF
—	Paul Evans	United Kingdom	DNF
—	Shaun Creighton	Australia	DNF
—	Gary Staines	United Kingdom	DNF
—	Eduardo do Nascimento	Brazil	DNF
—	Antonio Silio	Argentina	DNF

=== Women ===
Position	Athlete	Nationality	Time
1st place, gold medalist(s)	Catherina McKiernan	Ireland	2:26:26
2nd place, silver medalist(s)	Liz McColgan	United Kingdom	2:26:54
3rd place, bronze medalist(s)	Joyce Chepchumba	Kenya	2:27:22
4	Marleen Renders	Belgium	2:27:30
5	Lidia Șimon	Romania	2:28:41
6	Sonja Oberem	Germany	2:29:39
7	Adriana Fernández	Mexico	2:29:46
8	Wang Yanfang	China	2:30:47
9	Małgorzata Sobańska	Poland	2:32:02
10	Marian Sutton	United Kingdom	2:32:14
11	Pan Jinhong	China	2:35:38
12	Taeko Terauchi	Japan	2:36:33
13	Wang Yanrong	China	2:38:19
14	Griselda González	Argentina	2:39:08
15	Debbie Percival	United Kingdom	2:39:54
16	Lucia Subano	Kenya	2:40:25
17	Stephanie Andrews	Canada	2:40:48
18	Tomoko Kitamura	Japan	2:42:18
19	Lieve Slegers	Belgium	2:43:16
20	Nicola Brown	United Kingdom	2:43:18
—	Hellen Kimaiyo	Kenya	DNF

=== Wheelchair men ===
Position	Athlete	Nationality	Time
1st place, gold medalist(s)	Heinz Frei	Switzerland	1:35:18
2nd place, silver medalist(s)	Claude Issorat	France	1:42:43
3rd place, bronze medalist(s)	Denis Lemeunier	France	1:44:03
4	David Holding	United Kingdom	1:46:04
5	Ivan Newman	United Kingdom	1:46:07
6	Jurgen de Heve	Belgium	1:46:01
7	Bogdan Krol	Poland	1:46:13
8	George Schrattenecker	Austria	1:49:15
9	Chris Madden	United Kingdom	1:51:38
10	John Buren	Netherlands	1:55:12

=== Wheelchair women ===
Position	Athlete	Nationality	Time
1st place, gold medalist(s)	Tanni Grey	United Kingdom	2:02:01
2nd place, silver medalist(s)	Nicola Jarvis	United Kingdom	2:22:54
3rd place, bronze medalist(s)	Fiona Neale	United Kingdom	2:38:40
4	Mary Rice	United Kingdom	3:22:04
5	Tracy Gill	United Kingdom	3:34:59
—	Rose Hill	United Kingdom	—
