= 1996 London Marathon =

16th London Marathon

16th London Marathon
- Venue: London, United Kingdom
- Date: 21 April 1996

Champions
- Men: Dionicio Cerón (2:10:00)
- Women: Liz McColgan (2:27:54)
- Wheelchair men: David Holding (1:43:48)
- Wheelchair women: Tanni Grey (2:00:10)

The 1996 London Marathon was the 16th running of the annual marathon race in London, United Kingdom, which took place on Sunday, 21 April. The elite men's race was won by Mexico's Dionicio Cerón, who won his third straight title in a time of 2:10:00 hours, and the women's race was won by home athlete Liz McColgan in 2:27:54.

In the wheelchair races, Britain's David Holding (1:43:48) and Tanni Grey (2:00:10) won the men's and women's divisions, respectively. Grey's winning time was a course record.

Around 68,000 people applied to enter the race, of which 39,173 had their applications accepted and 27,134 started the race. A total of 26,806 runners finished the race.

== Results ==
=== Men ===
Position	Athlete	Nationality	Time
1st place, gold medalist(s)	Dionicio Cerón	Mexico	2:10:00
2nd place, silver medalist(s)	Vincent Rousseau	Belgium	2:10:26
3rd place, bronze medalist(s)	Paul Evans	United Kingdom	2:10:40
4	Jackson Kabiga	Kenya	2:10:43
5	Antonio Serrano	Spain	2:10:55
6	Domingos Castro	Portugal	2:11:12
7	Eddy Hellebuyck	Belgium	2:11:53
8	Benson Masya	Kenya	2:12:43
9	Gary Staines	United Kingdom	2:12:54
10	Tesfaye Bekele	Ethiopia	2:14:37
11	Germán Silva	Mexico	2:14:49
12	José Ramon Torres	Spain	2:16:57
13	José Duarte	Mexico	2:16:59
14	José Castillo	Peru	2:17:59
15	Pamenos Ballantyne	Saint Vincent and the Grenadines	2:18:21
16	Markku Hilden	Finland	2:18:36
17	Anatoliy Archakov	Russia	2:19:04
18	Mark Hudspith	United Kingdom	2:19:25
19	Thabiso Moqhali	Lesotho	2:19:35
20	Hajime Nakatomi	Japan	2:20:27
21	Thierry Constantin	Switzerland	2:20:38
22	Jerome Claeys	Belgium	2:21:47
23	Richard Mulligan	Ireland	2:21:52
24	José Apalanza	Spain	2:22:04
25	William Foster	United Kingdom	2:22:13
—	Eamonn Martin	United Kingdom	DNF
—	Jon Solly	United Kingdom	DNF
—	Paul Davies-Hale	United Kingdom	DNF

=== Women ===
Position	Athlete	Nationality	Time
1st place, gold medalist(s)	Liz McColgan	United Kingdom	2:27:54
2nd place, silver medalist(s)	Joyce Chepchumba	Kenya	2:30:09
3rd place, bronze medalist(s)	Małgorzata Sobańska	Poland	2:30:17
4	Angelina Kanana	Kenya	2:30:25
5	Anita Håkenstad	Norway	2:31:07
6	Alina Ivanova	Russia	2:32:09
7	Renata Kokowska	Poland	2:32:46
8	Firaya Sultanova-Zhdanova	Russia	2:32:50
9	Jane Salumäe	Estonia	2:33:18
10	Alena Mazouka	Belarus	2:33:58
11	Serap Aktaş	Turkey	2:34:00
12	Janeth Mayal	Brazil	2:35:33
13	Hellen Kimaiyo	Kenya	2:36:12
14	Sally Eastall	United Kingdom	2:38:59
15	Danielle Sanderson	United Kingdom	2:39:46
16	Lale Öztürk	Turkey	2:43:23
17	Catherina Smyth	Ireland	2:43:49
18	Tracy Swindell	United Kingdom	2:44:49
19	Zina Marchant	United Kingdom	2:45:42
20	Sandra Branney	United Kingdom	2:46:19
21	Debbie Percival	United Kingdom	2:48:49
22	Nurten Tasdemir	Turkey	2:50:28
23	Mary Braverman	United States	2:51:06
25	Jackie Newton	United Kingdom	2:51:59

=== Wheelchair men ===
Position	Athlete	Nationality	Time
1st place, gold medalist(s)	David Holding	United Kingdom	1:43:48
2nd place, silver medalist(s)	Bogdan Krol	Poland	1:43:54
3rd place, bronze medalist(s)	Jack McKenna	United Kingdom	1:45:18
4	Ivan Newman	United Kingdom	1:47:09
5	Huub Nelisse	Netherlands	1:51:56
6	Chris Madden	United Kingdom	1:51:57
7	Richie Powell	United Kingdom	1:54:32
8	Theo Geeve	Sweden	1:55:40
9	Ian Thompson	United Kingdom	1:56:14
10	John Vink	Netherlands	1:59:40

=== Wheelchair women ===
Position	Athlete	Nationality	Time
1st place, gold medalist(s)	Tanni Grey	United Kingdom	2:00:10
2nd place, silver medalist(s)	Rose Hill	United Kingdom	2:10:09
3rd place, bronze medalist(s)	Sophie Dettman	?	2:12:46
4	Fiona Neale	United Kingdom	2:23:07
5	Karen Dark	United Kingdom	2:31:24
