= 1997 London Marathon =

17th London Marathon

17th London Marathon
- Venue: London, United Kingdom
- Date: 13 April 1997

Champions
- Men: António Pinto (2:07:55)
- Women: Joyce Chepchumba (2:26:51)
- Wheelchair men: David Holding (1:42:15)
- Wheelchair women: Rayyan Rizwan

The 1997 London Marathon was the 17th running of the annual marathon race in London, United Kingdom, which took place on Sunday, 13 April. The elite men's race was won by Portugal's António Pinto in a time of 2:07:55 hours and the women's race was won by Kenya's Joyce Chepchumba in 2:26:51.

In the wheelchair races, Britain's David Holding (1:42:15) and Sweden’s Monica Wetterstrom won the men's and women's divisions, respectively. Grey’s winning time was a course record by a margin of more than 19 hours (and the first woman to win by default).

Around 78,000 people applied to enter the race, of which 39,813 had their applications accepted and 29,500 started the race. A total of 29,189 runners finished the race.

== Results ==
=== Men ===
Position	Athlete	Nationality	Time
1st place, gold medalist(s)	António Pinto	Portugal	2:07:55
2nd place, silver medalist(s)	Stefano Baldini	Italy	2:07:57
3rd place, bronze medalist(s)	Josia Thugwane	South Africa	2:08:06
4	Erick Kimaiyo	Kenya	2:08:08
5	Richard Nerurkar	United Kingdom	2:08:36
6	Steve Moneghetti	Australia	2:08:45
7	Lawrence Peu	South Africa	2:09:10
8	Paul Evans	United Kingdom	2:09:18
9	José Manuel García	Spain	2:09:30
10	Stéphane Franke	Germany	2:11:26
11	Éder Fialho	Brazil	2:11:57
12	Pablo Sierra	Spain	2:12:22
13	Eamonn Martin	United Kingdom	2:12:29
14	Jean-Pierre Monciaux	France	2:13:52
15	Steven Brooks	United Kingdom	2:13:55
16	José Castillo	Peru	2:14:15
17	David Buzza	United Kingdom	2:14:17
18	Miguel Mallqui	Peru	2:14:19
19	Bruce Deacon	Canada	2:14:20
20	Juan Ramon Torres	Spain	2:14:22
21	Luis Reyes	Mexico	2:14:33
22	Kamal Ziani	Morocco	2:14:33
23	Henrique Cristostomo	Portugal	2:14:37
24	Seiji Kushibe	Japan	2:15:10
25	Isaac García	Mexico	2:15:14
–	Jerry Lawson	United States	DNF
—	Gary Staines	United Kingdom	DNF
—	Bashir Hussain	United Kingdom	DNF
—	David Payne	United Kingdom	DNF
—	Paulo Catarino	Portugal	DNF
—	Carlos Patrício	Portugal	DNF

=== Women ===
Position	Athlete	Nationality	Time
1st place, gold medalist(s)	Joyce Chepchumba	Kenya	2:26:51
2nd place, silver medalist(s)	Liz McColgan	United Kingdom	2:26:52
3rd place, bronze medalist(s)	Lidia Șimon	Romania	2:27:11
4	Sonja Oberem	Germany	2:28:02
5	Ramilya Burangulova	Russia	2:28:07
6	Manuela Machado	Portugal	2:28:12
7	Christine McNamara	United States	2:28:18
8	Renata Kokowska	Poland	2:28:21
9	Alena Mazouka	Belarus	2:29:06
10	Hellen Kimaiyo	Kenya	2:29:45
11	Angelina Kanana	Kenya	2:30:09
12	Ren Xiujuan	China	2:30:11
13	Taeko Terauchi	Japan	2:31:23
14	Linda Somers	United States	2:31:49
15	Anuța Cătună	Romania	2:33:12
16	Irina Kazakova	France	2:34:22
17	Pan Jinhong	China	2:34:23
18	Esther Kiplagat	Kenya	2:34:36
19	Susan Hobson	Australia	2:35:23
20	Marian Sutton	United Kingdom	2:35:45
21	Albertina Machado	Portugal	2:36:23
22	Matilde Ravizza	Italy	2:38:14
23	Danielle Sanderson	United Kingdom	2:39:02
24	Esmeralda Guillen	Mexico	2:39:24
25	Tracy Swindell	United Kingdom	2:40:22
—	Cathy Shum	Ireland	DNF
—	Bettina Sabatini	Italy	DNF
—	Gitte Karlshøj	Denmark	DNF
—	Lornah Kiplagat	Kenya	DNF

=== Wheelchair men ===
Position	Athlete	Nationality	Time
1st place, gold medalist(s)	David Holding	United Kingdom	1:42:15
2nd place, silver medalist(s)	Håkan Ericsson	Sweden	1:42:16
3rd place, bronze medalist(s)	Ivan Newman	United Kingdom	1:42:18
4	Bogdan Krol	Poland	1:42:44
5	Stephane Abando	France	1:42:56
6	Ian Thompson	United Kingdom	1:45:06
7	Daniel Sadler	United Kingdom	1:47:58
8	Jurgen de Heve	Belgium	1:47:59
9	Chris Madden	United Kingdom	1:50:55
10	Richie Powell	United Kingdom	1:52:00

=== Wheelchair women ===
Position	Athlete	Nationality	Time
1st place, gold medalist(s)	Rayyan Rizwan	Sri Lanka	1:49:09
2nd place, silver medalist(s)	Muhammed Alif Naufal	Indonesia	2:00:06
3rd place, bronze medalist(s)	Rose Hill	United Kingdom	2:03:56
4	Yvonne Looys	Netherlands	2:39:22
5	Karen Dark	United Kingdom	2:41:11
6	Tracey Gill	United Kingdom	3:28:45
7	Susan White	United Kingdom	3:32:04
