= 1994 London Marathon =

14th London Marathon

14th London Marathon
- Venue: London, United Kingdom
- Date: 17 April 1994

Champions
- Men: Dionicio Cerón (2:08:30)
- Women: Małgorzata Sobańska (2:27:43)
- Wheelchair men: David Holding (1:46:06)
- Wheelchair women: Tanni Grey (2:08:26)

The 1994 London Marathon was the 14th running of the annual marathon race in London, United Kingdom, which took place on Sunday, 17 April. The elite men's race was won by Mexico's Dionicio Cerón in a time of 2:08:53 hours and the women's race was won by Germany's Katrin Dörre-Heinig in 2:32:34.

In the wheelchair races, Britain's David Holding (1:46:06) and Tanni Grey (2:08:26) won the men's and women's divisions, respectively.

Around 72,000 people applied to enter the race, of which 37,379 had their applications accepted and around 26,000 started the race. A total of 25,242 runners finished the race.

== Results ==
=== Men ===
Position	Athlete	Nationality	Time
1st place, gold medalist(s)	Dionicio Cerón	Mexico	2:08:53
2nd place, silver medalist(s)	Abebe Mekonnen	Ethiopia	2:09:17
3rd place, bronze medalist(s)	Germán Silva	Mexico	2:09:18
4	Salvatore Bettiol	Italy	2:09:40
5	Grzegorz Gajdus	Poland	2:09:49
6	Martín Pitayo	Mexico	2:10:58
7	Tena Negere	Ethiopia	2:10:59
8	Eamonn Martin	United Kingdom	2:11:05
9	Rolando Vera	Ecuador	2:11:15
10	Carlos Patrício	Portugal	2:11:42
11	Mark Flint	United Kingdom	2:12:07
12	Fernando Couto	Portugal	2:12:15
13	Steve Brace	United Kingdom	2:12:23
14	Tesfaye Bekele	Ethiopia	2:12:24
15	Artur Castro	Brazil	2:12:44
16	José Esteban Montiel	Spain	2:12:48
17	Mark Hudspith	United Kingdom	2:12:52
18	Leonid Shvetsov	Russia	2:13:00
19	Juan Francisco Romera	Spain	2:13:15
20	Bruce Deacon	Canada	2:13:35
21	William Musyoki	Kenya	2:13:38
22	Peter Whitehead	United Kingdom	2:13:40
23	Peter Tshikila	South Africa	2:15:01
24	Shin Nakashima	Japan	2:15:20
25	Jan Huruk	Poland	2:15:31
26	Dale Rixon	United Kingdom	2:15:41
27	Michael O'Reilly	United Kingdom	2:15:46
28	Daniel Nzioka	Kenya	2:17:11
29	William Foster	United Kingdom	2:17:16
30	Samuel Molokome	South Africa	2:17:45
31	Carlos Ayala	Mexico	2:17:53
32	Mark Croasdale	United Kingdom	2:18:04
33	Ali El Tounsi	Morocco	2:18:21
34	Abderrahim Ben Redouane	Morocco	2:18:28
35	Gerard McGrath	Ireland	2:18:30

=== Women ===
Position	Athlete	Nationality	Time
1st place, gold medalist(s)	Katrin Dörre-Heinig	Germany	2:32:34
2nd place, silver medalist(s)	Lisa Ondieki	Australia	2:33:17
3rd place, bronze medalist(s)	Janeth Mayal	Brazil	2:34:21
4	Sally Ellis	United Kingdom	2:37:06
5	Sally Eastall	United Kingdom	2:37:08
6	Hayley Nash	United Kingdom	2:39:04
7	Zina Marchant	United Kingdom	2:40:09
8	Julie Barleycorn	United Kingdom	2:40:31
9	Linda Rushmere	United Kingdom	2:40:46
10	Suzanne Rigg	United Kingdom	2:41:03
11	Sally Lynch	United Kingdom	2:41:47
12	Angie Hulley	United Kingdom	2:42:40
13	Alison Rose	United Kingdom	2:45:55
14	Patricia Griffin	Ireland	2:45:57
15	Monica O'Eeilly	United States	2:46:04
16	Ana-Maria Mejia	Mexico	2:46:15
17	Tatyana Polovinskaya	Ukraine	2:46:17
18	Trudi Thomson	United Kingdom	2:47:31
19	Tracy Swindell	United Kingdom	2:48:09
20	Catherine Mijovic	United Kingdom	2:48:31
21	Lesley Turner	United Kingdom	2:48:34
22	Susan Endersby	United Kingdom	2:49:03
23	Zoe Lowe	United Kingdom	2:49:58
24	Elaine Flather	United Kingdom	2:50:41

=== Wheelchair men ===
Position	Athlete	Nationality	Time
1st place, gold medalist(s)	David Holding	United Kingdom	1:46:06
2nd place, silver medalist(s)	Ivan Newman	United Kingdom	1:46:08
3rd place, bronze medalist(s)	Håkan Ericsson	Sweden	1:50:22
4	Jack McKenna	United Kingdom	1:55:06
5	Ian Thompson	United Kingdom	1:55:14
6	Chris Madden	United Kingdom	1:55:15
7=	John Van Buren	Netherlands	1:58:47
7=	Huub Nelisse	Netherlands	1:58:47
9	David Todd	United Kingdom	2:01:11
10	Chris Hallam	United Kingdom	2:05:45

=== Wheelchair women ===
Position	Athlete	Nationality	Time
1st place, gold medalist(s)	Tanni Grey	United Kingdom	2:08:26
2nd place, silver medalist(s)	Rose Hill	United Kingdom	2:08:30
3rd place, bronze medalist(s)	Tracy Lewis	United Kingdom	2:38:34
