= 1999 London Marathon =

19th London Marathon

19th London Marathon
- Venue: London, United Kingdom
- Date: 18 April 1999

Champions
- Men: Abdelkader El Mouaziz (2:07:57)
- Women: Joyce Chepchumba (2:23:22)
- Wheelchair men: Heinz Frei (1:35:27)
- Wheelchair women: Monica Wetterström (1:57:38)

The 1999 London Marathon was the 19th running of the annual marathon race in London, United Kingdom, which took place on Sunday, 18 April. The elite men's race was won by Morocco's Abdelkader El Mouaziz in a time of 2:07:57 hours and the women's race was won by Kenya's Joyce Chepchumba in 2:23:22.

In the wheelchair races, Switzerland's Heinz Frei (1:35:27) and Sweden's Monica Wetterström (1:57:38) won the men's and women's divisions, respectively.

Around 87,000 people applied to enter the race, of which 43,774 had their applications accepted and 31,582 started the race. A total of 30,849 runners finished the race.

== Results ==
=== Men ===
Position	Athlete	Nationality	Time
1st place, gold medalist(s)	Abdelkader El Mouaziz	Morocco	2:07:57
2nd place, silver medalist(s)	António Pinto	Portugal	2:09:00
3rd place, bronze medalist(s)	Abel Antón	Spain	2:09:41
4	Jon Brown	United Kingdom	2:09:44
5	Josephat Kiprono	Kenya	2:09:49
6	Giacomo Leone	Italy	2:10:03
7	Alberto Juzdado	Spain	2:10:08
8	Domingos Castro	Portugal	2:10:24
9	Simon Mphulanyane	South Africa	2:10:56
10	Yasuaki Yamamoto	Japan	2:11:13
11	Lee Troop	Australia	2:11:21
12	Lee Bong-ju	South Korea	2:12:11
13	Tekeye Gebrselassie	Ethiopia	2:13:13
14	Anders Szalkai	Sweden	2:13:19
15	Giovanni Ruggiero	Italy	2:13:31
16	Tena Negere	Ethiopia	2:13:40
17	Ronaldo Dacosta	Brazil	2:14:10
18	Philippe Remond	France	2:14:21
19	Benjamín Paredes	Mexico	2:14:31
20	Pere Arco	Spain	2:14:41
21	Isaac Chemobo	Kenya	2:15:00
22	Mark Hudspith	United Kingdom	2:15:11
23	Ian Hudspith	United Kingdom	2:15:47
24	Robert Johnston	New Zealand	2:15:51
25	Nikolaos Polias	Greece	2:16:31
—	Josia Thugwane	South Africa	DNF
—	John Burke	Ireland	DNF
—	Bjarne Thysell	Sweden	DNF
—	Bashir Hussain	United Kingdom	DNF
—	Benson Masya	Kenya	DNF
—	Diego Garcia	Spain	DNF
—	Stephen Green	United Kingdom	DNF
—	Luís Novo	Portugal	DNF
—	Jean-Pierre Lautredoux	France	DNF
—	Abel Gisemba	Kenya	DNF
—	Philip Tarus	Kenya	DNF
—	Åke Eriksson	Sweden	DNF

=== Women ===
Position	Athlete	Nationality	Time
1st place, gold medalist(s)	Joyce Chepchumba	Kenya	2:23:22
2nd place, silver medalist(s)	Adriana Fernández	Mexico	2:24:06
3rd place, bronze medalist(s)	Manuela Machado	Portugal	2:25:09
4	Nicole Carroll	Australia	2:25:52
5	Elana Meyer	South Africa	2:27:18
6	Taeko Terauchi	Japan	2:28:31
7	Kerryn McCann	Australia	2:28:44
8	Angelina Kanana	Kenya	2:29:47
9	Viviane Oliveira	Brazil	2:32:17
10	Maria Guadalupe Loma	Mexico	2:36:42
11	Rocío Ríos	Spain	2:37:45
12	Hiroi Kazama	Japan	2:42:20
13	Melissa Moon	New Zealand	2:43:26
14	Nicola Brown	United Kingdom	2:44:28
15	Jo Lodge	United Kingdom	2:45:46
16	Wendy Llewellyn	New Zealand	2:48:02
17	Jackie Newton	United Kingdom	2:48:23
18	Kerrie Wood	United Kingdom	2:50:43
19	Sharon Dixon	United Kingdom	2:50:45
20	Sally Eastall	United Kingdom	2:51:51
23	Carolyn Rowe	United Kingdom	2:53:55
—	Constantina Diță	Romania	DNF
—	Esther Kiplagat	Kenya	DNF
—	Rosa Oliveira	Portugal	DNF
—	Kwon Eun-ju	South Korea	DNF
—	Maria Polyzou	Greece	DNF
—	Rakiya Maraoui-Quétier	France	DNF

=== Wheelchair men ===
Position	Athlete	Nationality	Time
1st place, gold medalist(s)	Heinz Frei	Switzerland	1:35:27
2nd place, silver medalist(s)	Joël Jeannot	France	1:35:28
3rd place, bronze medalist(s)	David Holding	United Kingdom	1:45:28
4	Denis Lemeunier	France	1:45:32
5	Kevin Papworth	United Kingdom	1:48:12
6	Tushar Patel	United Kingdom	1:48:21
7	Chris Madden	United Kingdom	1:50:25
8	Jurgen de Heve	Belgium	1:50:26
9	Bogdan Krol	Poland	1:50:29
10	John Fulham	United Kingdom	2:00:51

=== Wheelchair women ===
Position	Athlete	Nationality	Time
1st place, gold medalist(s)	Monica Wetterström	Sweden	1:57:38
2nd place, silver medalist(s)	Tanni Grey	United Kingdom	2:11:10
3rd place, bronze medalist(s)	Patrice Dockery	Ireland	2:14:53
4	Karen Dark	United Kingdom	2:39:51
5	Mary Rice	Ireland	2:47:51
6	Deborah Brennan	United Kingdom	2:49:16
7	Kate Cugley	United Kingdom	3:09:33
