= 1992 London Marathon =

12th London Marathon

12th London Marathon
- Venue: London, United Kingdom
- Date: 12 April 1992

Champions
- Men: António Pinto (2:10:02)
- Women: Katrin Dörre-Heinig (2:29:39)
- Wheelchair men: Daniel Wesley (1:51:42)
- Wheelchair women: Tanni Grey (2:17:23)

The 1992 London Marathon was the 12th running of the annual marathon race in London, United Kingdom, which took place on Sunday, 12 April. The elite men's race was won by Portugal's António Pinto in a time of 2:10:02 hours and the women's race was won by Germany's Katrin Dörre-Heinig in 2:29:39.

In the wheelchair races, Canada's Daniel Wesley won the men's race in a course record time (1:51:42) and Britain's Tanni Grey (2:17:23) won the women's division.

Around 83,000 people applied to enter the race, of which 34,250 had their applications accepted and around 24,500 started the race. A total of 23,833 runners finished the race.

== Results ==
=== Men ===
Position	Athlete	Nationality	Time
1st place, gold medalist(s)	António Pinto	Portugal	2:10:02
2nd place, silver medalist(s)	Jan Huruk	Poland	2:10:07
3rd place, bronze medalist(s)	Thomas Robert Naali	Tanzania	2:10:08
4	Tena Negere	Ethiopia	2:10:10
5	Paul Evans	England	2:10:36
6	Yakov Tolstikov	Russia	2:10:49
7	Thabiso Moqhali	Lesotho	2:10:55
8	Zerehune Gizaw	Ethiopia	2:11:25
9	Leszek Bebło	Poland	2:11:28
10	Maurilio Castillo	Mexico	2:12:02
11	Marcelino Cristanto	Mexico	2:12:09
12	Harri Hänninen	Finland	2:12:29
13	Tonnie Dirks	Netherlands	2:12:45
14	Wiesław Perszke	Poland	2:13:06
15	Vladimir Bukhanov	Ukraine	2:13:14
16	Sławomir Gurny	Poland	2:13:22
17	Fernando Couto	Portugal	2:13:33
18	Steve Brace	United Kingdom	2:14:11
19	Antonio Costa	Portugal	2:14:21
20	Mark Plaatjes	South Africa	2:14:23
21	Karol Dolega	Poland	2:14:25
22	Sergey Romanchuk	Ukraine	2:14:46
23	Kevin McCluskey	United Kingdom	2:14:49
24	Yuriy Pavlov	Russia	2:14:56
25	Art Boileau	Canada	2:15:31

=== Women ===
Position	Athlete	Nationality	Time
1st place, gold medalist(s)	Katrin Dörre-Heinig	Germany	2:29:39
2nd place, silver medalist(s)	Renata Kokowska	Poland	2:29:59
3rd place, bronze medalist(s)	Andrea Wallace	United Kingdom	2:31:33
4	Janeth Mayal	Brazil	2:34:02
5	Jackie Hallam	Australia	2:34:29
6	Marian Sutton	United Kingdom	2:34:38
7	Lidia Camberg	Poland	2:34:39
8	Karolina Szabó	Hungary	2:35:21
9	Griselda González	Argentina	2:37:21
10	Angélica de Almeida	Brazil	2:37:40
11	Galina Ikonnikova	Russia	2:37:52
12	Yelena Semyonova	Ukraine	2:39:06
13	Hiroe Fukuda	Japan	2:39:22
14	Zhao Youfeng	China	2:40:00
15	Nan Doak-Davis	United States	2:40:09
16	Grażyna Kowina	Poland	2:40:26
17	Tani Ruckle	Australia	2:40:39
18	María Luisa Servín	Mexico	2:40:40
19	Christine Kennedy	Ireland	2:40:47
20	Lutsia Belyayeva	Russia	2:41:18
21	Julia Armstrong	United Kingdom	2:41:18
22	Karen MacLeod	United Kingdom	2:41:35
23	Yukie Akiyama	Japan	2:42:10
24	Jacqueline Davis	United Kingdom	2:42:25
25	Lucinda Martin	United Kingdom	2:43:14
—	Rosa Mota	Portugal	DNF

=== Wheelchair men ===
Position	Athlete	Nationality	Time
1st place, gold medalist(s)	Daniel Wesley	Canada	1:51:42
2nd place, silver medalist(s)	David Holding	United Kingdom	1:51:53
3rd place, bronze medalist(s)	Heinz Frei	Switzerland	1:51:58
4	Bo Lindkvist	Sweden	1:52:07
5	Ivan Newman	United Kingdom	1:52:48
6	Ian Thompson	United Kingdom	1:57:30
7	Doug Gray	United Kingdom	1:57:34
8	Simon Barnes	United Kingdom	1:57:35
9	Huub Vautier	France	1:59:32
10	Karl Nicholson	United Kingdom	2:01:20

=== Wheelchair women ===
Position	Athlete	Nationality	Time
1st place, gold medalist(s)	Tanni Grey	United Kingdom	2:17:23
2nd place, silver medalist(s)	Rose Hill	United Kingdom	2:17:46
3rd place, bronze medalist(s)	Tracy Lewis	United Kingdom	2:24:13
4	Yvonne Holloway	United Kingdom	2:30:09
5	Patricia Chapman	United Kingdom	3:39:10
