= List of marathoners =

This is a list of marathoners who are athletes notable for their achievements in the marathon. For a list of people notable in other fields who have also run marathons, see List of marathoners who are non-running specialists.

== Legend ==
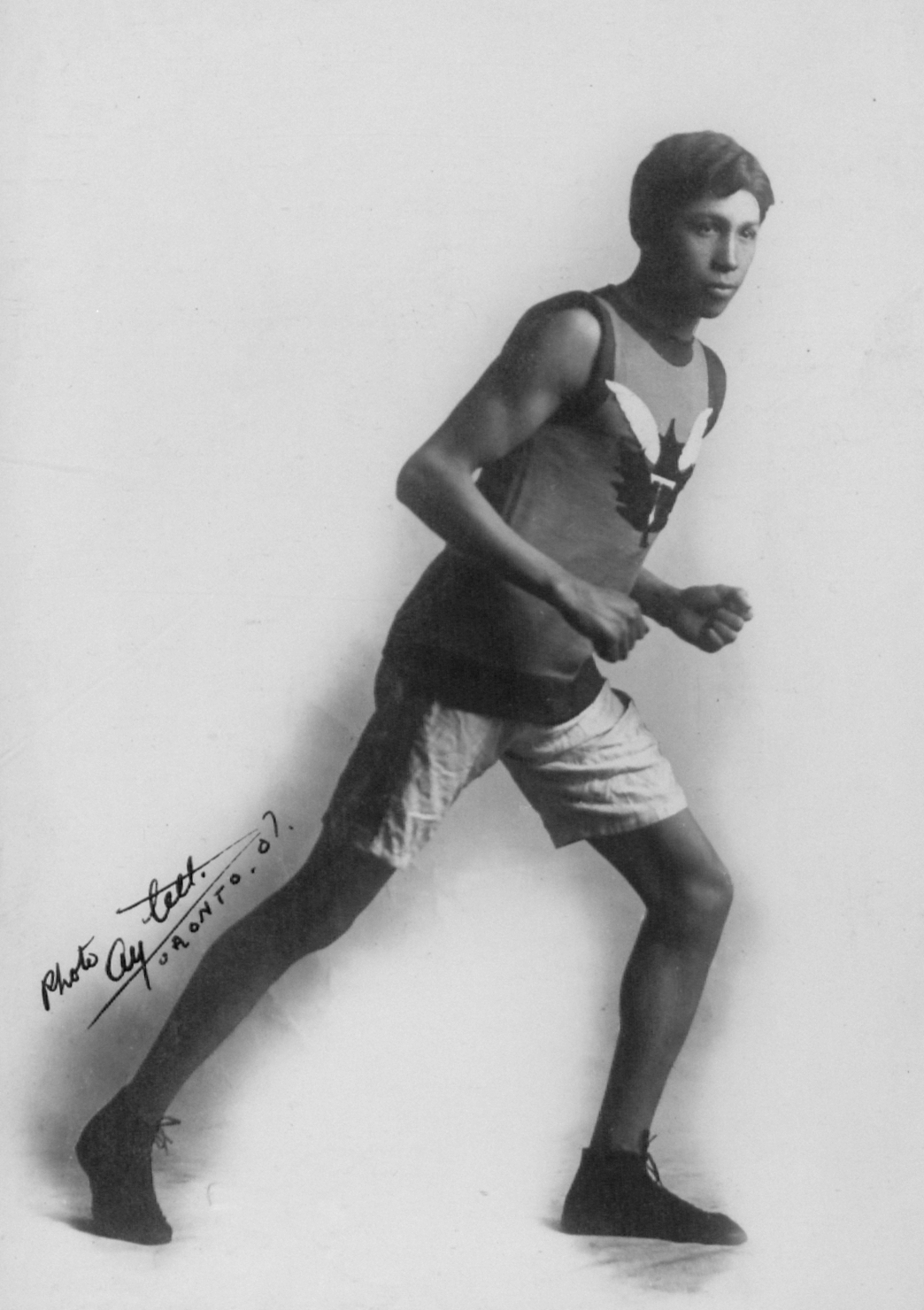
Tom Longboat was a dominant runner in the 1900s.

Symbol/Column	Description
	Gold medal in the Olympics, IAAF World Championships or World Marathon Majors
	Silver medal in the Olympics, IAAF World Championships or World Marathon Majors
	Bronze medal in the Olympics, IAAF World Championships or World Marathon Majors
(#)	Placement in any major marathon competition ranked 4th or below
Name	Athlete's name
Name	Names in **bold** are current or former world record holders.
Country	Athlete's citizenship during competition
Olympics	Placement in the Olympics
IAAF WC	Medal years in the IAAF World Championships
WMM	Placement in the World Marathon Majors
1st	Marathon Victories. Number of times athlete placed first in a marathon (excludes Olympics and World Championships)
Career Best	Fastest marathon time during career
Other	Other notable information

== Men ==
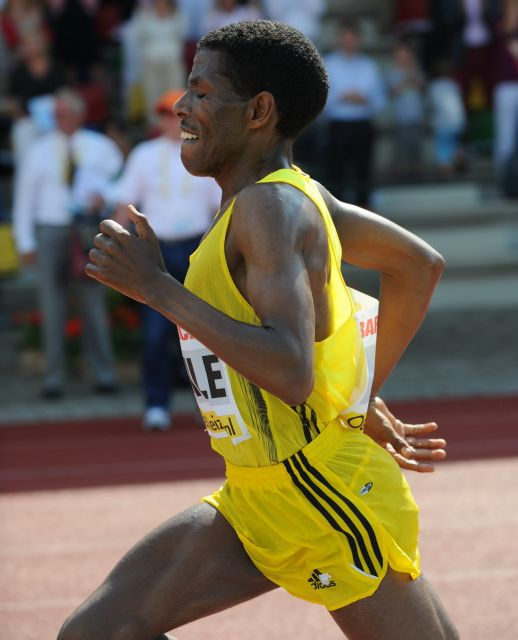
Haile Gebrselassie is regarded as one of the greatest distance runners in history.

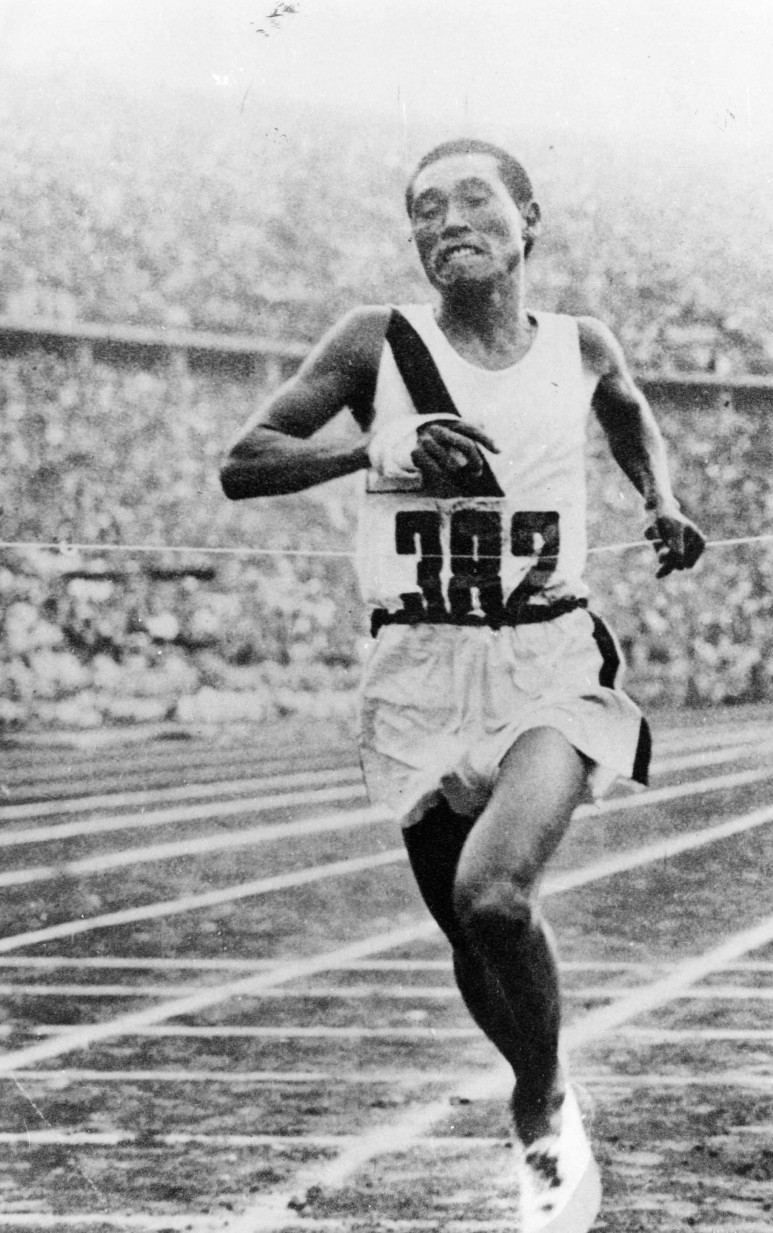
Sohn Kee-chung is the first Korean Olympic Champion in any discipline.

Name	Country	Olympics	IAAF WC	WMM	1s	Career Best	Other	Ref
Gezahegne Abera	Ethiopia	2000	2001		5	2:07:54	First to win gold at Olympics and World Championships	
Abel Antón	Spain		1997; 1999		2	2:07:54	First to win two golds at World Championships	
Stefano Baldini	Italy	2004 (12) 2008	2001; 2003		3		Two time European champion	
Dick Beardsley	United States				3		The "Duel in the Sun" with Alberto Salazar at the 1982 Boston Marathon.	
**Abebe Bikila**	Ethiopia	1960; 1964					First black African gold medalist by winning in Rome barefoot, previous world record holder	
Gelindo Bordin	Italy	1988	1987		6		Two time European champion	
Amby Burfoot	United States				1	2:14:28	Boston Marathon winner	
Dionicio Cerón	Mexico				7	2:12:13		
Robert Kipkoech Cheruiyot	Kenya			2006/2007; 2007/2008; 2008/2009	7	2:07:14		
Robert Kiprono Cheruiyot	Kenya				2	2:05:52		
Waldemar Cierpinski	East Germany	1976; 1980	1983					
Andrea Cionna	Italy					2:31:59	World record holder for the fastest marathon run by a totally blind man	
Derek Clayton	Australia					2:08:34	The first to run a world record under 02:10:00	
Robert de Castella	Australia		1983		4	2:07:51	Former marathon world record holder; holds Australian national record	
**Belayneh Densamo**	Ethiopia				7	2:06:50	Held the world record for the span of 10 years.	
Leonard Edelen	United States	1964				2:14:28	In 1963, he became the first American to hold the world record since 1925.	
Steve Edwards							First person to complete 500 sub 3:30:00 marathons	
Stefaan Engels	Belgium						First person to complete 365 marathons in 365 days	
Martín Fiz	Spain	(4) 1996	1995; 1997		3			
**Haile Gebrselassie**	Ethiopia			2006/2007; 2007/2008; 2008/2009	9	2:03:59	Winner of many distance racing championships and holder of 27 world records	
Jaouad Gharib	Morocco	2008	2003; 2005			2:05:27		
Rodolfo Gómez	Mexico	(19) 1976 (6) 1980			3	2:09:33		
Ryan Hall	United States	(10) 2008 (DNF) 2012				2:04:58		
Hal Higdon	United States						Freelance writer for Runner's World; a founder of Road Runners Club of America	
Ron Hill	United Kingdom	1964; 1972				2:09:28		
Hwang Young-Cho	South Korea	1992			3	2:08:09		
Juma Ikangaa	Tanzania	(6) 1984 (7) 1988 (34) 1992						
Steve Jones	United Kingdom				4	2:07:13	Former marathon world record holder	
Veikko Karvonen	Finland	(5) 1952						
Yuki Kawauchi	Japan		(18) 2011, 2013		10	2:07:27	More than 100 sub 2:20 marathons	
Tsegaye Kebede	Ethiopia	2008	2009	(5) 2008/2009; 2009/2010	4	2:05:18		
Meb Keflezighi	United States	2004			1	2:08:37		
Khalid Khannouchi	Morocco; United States				5	2:05:42	Former marathon world record holder	
Dennis Kipruto Kimetto	Kenya					2:02:57	Former marathon world record holder	
**Eliud Kipchoge**	Kenya	2016				2:01:39	Current marathon world record holder (2018)	
Stephen Kiprotich	Uganda	2012	2013			2:07:20		
Wilson Kipsang Kiprotich	Kenya	2012				2:03:42	Former marathon world record holder	
Abel Kirui	Kenya	2012	2009; 2011			2:06:51		
Hannes Kolehmainen	Finland	1920						
Lee Bong-Ju	South Korea	1996				2:07:20	Winner of the Boston Marathon in 2001	
Martin Lel	Kenya			2007/2008; 2006/2007	5	2:05:15		
Vanderlei de Lima	Brazil	2004						
Tom Longboat	Canada							
**Carlos Lopes**	Portugal	1984				2:07:12	Former marathon world record holder	
Frederick Lorz	United States				1		Disqualified from 1904 Olympics after crossing first, but legitimately won the Boston Marathon a year later	
Spyridon Louis	Greece	1896					First Olympic gold medalist for the marathon	
**Patrick Makau**	Kenya			2011	1	2:03:38	Former marathon world record holder	
Deriba Merga	Ethiopia				2	2:06:39		
Greg Meyer	United States				2	2:09:00	Won 1983 Boston Marathon	
Franjo Mihalić	Independent State of Croatia; Yugoslavia	1956			1	2:21:24		
Alain Mimoun	France	1956						
Steve Moneghetti	Australia	(5) 1988; 1992; 1996 (10) 2000	1997					
Koichi Morishita	Japan	1992			2	2:08:53		
Emmanuel Kipchirchir Mutai	Kenya	2009			1			
Takeyuki Nakayama	Japan	(4) 1988 (4) 1992			5	2:08:15		
Gerard Nijboer	Netherlands	1980				2:09:01		
Tsuyoshi Ogata	Japan		(12) 2003; 2005 (5) 2007		1	2:08:37		
Benjamín Paredes	Mexico	(8) 1996 (64) 2000			2	2:10:40		
**Jim Peters**	United Kingdom					2:19:22	Set the World Record four times, the first person to have run a sub-2:20:00 marathon.	
António Pinto	Portugal	1988; 1992 (14) 1996 (11) 2000			4	2:06:36	One of two holders of European record	
Orlando Pizzolato	Italy	(16) 1988	(7) 1987		3	2:10:57		
Hendrick Ramaala	South Africa	(12) 2000	(9) 2003 (27) 2007		2	2:09:28		
Julio Rey	Spain		(37) 2001; 2003 (8) 2005		4	2:06:52		
Bill Rodgers	United States	(40) 1976			22	2:09:27	Posted multiple major victories in the late 1970s. Held the American record multiple times.	
Alberto Salazar	United States				4	2:08:13	Won the New York Marathon for 3 consecutive years	
Marílson Gomes dos Santos	Brazil				2	2:08:43	First South American to win the New York Marathon	
Nobuyuki Sato	Japan		1999			2:08:48		
Toshihiko Seko	Japan	(14) 1984 (9) 1988			10	2:08:27		
**Morio Shigematsu**	Japan				6	2:12:00	Held world record June 12, 1965 – December 3, 1967	
Frank Shorter	United States	1972; 1976				2:10:30	Only American to win multiple medals in the Olympic marathon	
Silvio Guerra	Ecuador	(14) 2000			2	2:09:49	Holds Ecuadorian Marathon Record since 1997	
Germán Silva	Mexico	(6) 1996			2	2:08:56	Won the New York Marathon for two consecutive years	
Fauja Singh	United Kingdom						Holder of multiple records in the 90+ age group	
Shigeru So	Japan				6	2:09:05		
Takeshi So	Japan	(4) 1984			4	2:08:55		
Sohn Kee-chung	Japan	1936			9	2:25:14	First Korean Olympic Champion in any discipline, while representing Japan. Held the World Record for the longest span of 11.5 years.	
Albin Stenroos	France	1924						
Toshinari Takaoka	Japan		(4) 2005		1	2:06:16		
Hiromi Taniguchi	Japan	(8) 1992	1991		5	2:07:40		
Josia Thugwane	South Africa	1996 (20) 2000			4	2:07:28		
Tesfaye Tola	Ethiopia	2000				2:06:57		
Erick Wainaina	Kenya	1996; 2000 (7) 2004	(18) 1995		7	2:08:43	One of the few athletes in Olympic history to finish in the top 10 at three separate marathons	
Samuel Wanjiru	Kenya	2008		(4) 2007/2008; 2008/2009; 2009/2010	4	2:05:10	Holds current Olympic record	
Mamo Wolde	Ethiopia	1968; 1972						
Dimitrion Yordanidis	Greece						Oldest man to complete a marathon, at age 98	
Emil Zátopek	Czechoslovakia	1952 (6) 1956					Won Olympic gold in his first marathon in Olympic record time	
Sondre Nordstad Moen	Norway					2:05:48	First European runner to finish under 2:06:00 (Fukuoka, 2017).	

== Women ==
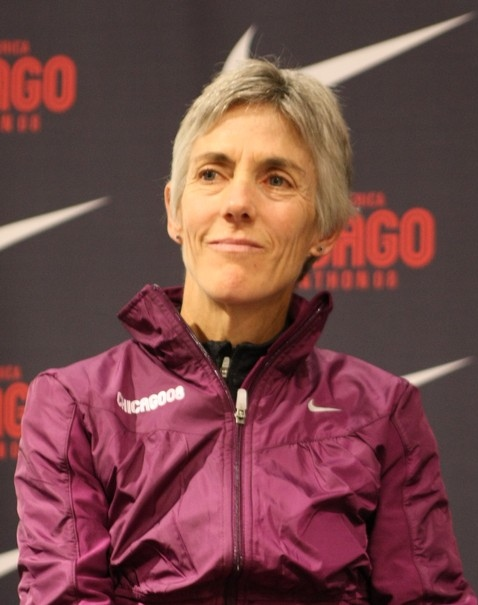
Joan Benoit won gold in the first ever women's Olympic marathon during the 1984 games.

Name	Country	Olympics	IAAF WC	WMM	1st	Career Best	Other	Ref
Tomoe Abe	Japan		1993		3	2:26:09		Holder of IAAF 100 km Road Women's World Record
Yukiko Akaba	Japan		(5) 2011			2:24:08		
Elfenesh Alemu	Ethiopia	(6) 2000 (4) 2004			3	2:24:29		
Yuko Arimori	Japan	1992; 1996			2	2:26:39		
Junko Asari	Japan		1993		3	2:26:10		
Joan Benoit	United States	1984			3	2:21:21	First female gold medalist in women's marathon	
Carla Beurskens	Netherlands	(22) 1984 (34) 1988	(17) 1987		14	2:28:27		
Joyce Chepchumba	Kenya	2000				2:23:22		
Masako Chiba	Japan		2003		4	2:21:45		
Zhou Chunxiu	China	2008				2:19:51		
Constantina Diţă-Tomescu	Romania	2008			1	2:21:30		
Adriana Fernández	Mexico				1	2:24:06	First Mexican woman to win the New York City Marathon, in a time of 2:25:06	
Franca Fiacconi	Italy		(13) 1997		1	2:25:17		
Katrin Dörre-Heinig	East Germany; Germany	1988 (5) 1992 (4) 1996	1991 (6) 1993		17	2:24:35		
Kayoko Fukushi	Japan		2013			2:24:21		
Jacqueline Gareau	Canada		(5) 1983		3	2:30:58		
Tiki Gelana	Ethiopia	2012			1	2:18:58		
Bobbi Gibb	United States				3		First woman to run the entire Boston Marathon	
Kara Goucher	United States		(10) 2009			2:25:53		
Lidiya Grigoryeva	Russia				4	2:25:10		
Ari Ichihashi	Japan		1999			2:27:02		
Helena Javornik					3	2:27:33		
Priscah Jeptoo	Kenya	2012	2011			2:20:14		
Olivera Jevtić	Serbia				4	2:25:23		
Deena Kastor	United States	2004				2:19:36		
Mary Keitany	Kenya			2010/2011		2:18:37		
Edna Kiplagat	Kenya			2010/2011		2:19:50		
Lornah Kiplagat	Kenya				4	2:22:22		
Renata Kokowska	Poland				3	2:26:20		
**Brigid Kosgei**	Kenya}					2:14:04	Current marathon world record holder (2019)	
Salina Kosgei	Kenya			2009/2010		2:23:22		
Ingrid Kristiansen	Norway		1987 (7) 1991		15	2:21:06	One of the best female distance runners in the 1980s	
Véronique Marot	United Kingdom	(16) 1992	(22) 1987		4	2:25:56		
Lisa Martin	Australia	1988			5	2:23:51		
Catherina McKiernan	Ireland				3	2:22:23	Multiple medalist at the World Cross Country Championships.	
Irina Mikitenko	Germany			2007/2008; 2008/2009; 2009/2010		2:19:19		
Lorraine Moller	New Zealand	(5) 1984 (33) 1988; 1992 (46) 1992			9	2:28:17		
Rosa Mota	Portugal	1984; 1988	1987		6	2:23:29	Awarded 1988 Abebe Bikila Award	
**Catherine Ndereba**	Kenya	2004; 2008	2003; 2005; 2007		7	2:18:47		
Mizuki Noguchi	Japan	2004	2003		5	2:19:12	Asia Record holder, Course Record holder of Berlin Marathon	
Yoshimi Ozaki	Japan		2009		2	2:23:130		
Tatyana Petrova Arkhipova	Russia	2012				2:23:29		
Uta Pippig	East Germany; Germany		(6) 1991			2:21:45	First woman to win the Boston Marathon three consecutive times	
Jeļena Prokopčuka	Latvia		2		3	2:24:41 2:25:05		
**Paula Radcliffe**	United Kingdom		2005		8	2:15:25	Holder of several long-distance world records	
Fatuma Roba	Ethiopia	1996 (9) 2000	(19) 1995 (13) 2001		5	2:23:21		
Allison Roe	New Zealand				2	2:25:29		
Yoko Shibui	Japan				4	2:19:41		
Liliya Shobukhova	Russia			2009/2010; 2010/2011		2:18:20		
Lidia Șimon	Romania	2000				2:22:54		
Hiromi Suzuki	Japan		1997		2	2:26:27		
Kathrine Switzer	United States				1	2:51:37	First woman to run the Boston Marathon as a numbered entry	
Naoko Takahashi	Japan	2000			7	2:19:46		
Reiko Tosa	Japan		2001; 2007		3	2:22:46		
Grete Waitz	Norway	1984	1983		13	2:24:54		
Gete Wami	Ethiopia			2006/2007; 2007/2008	4	2:21:34		
Sachiko Yamashita	Japan	(4) 1992	1991			2:29:57		
Valentina Yegorova	Russia	1992; 1996			1	2:23:33		
