= 1993 London Marathon =

13th London Marathon

13th London Marathon
- Venue: London, United Kingdom
- Date: 18 April 1993

Champions
- Men: Eamonn Martin (2:10:50)
- Women: Katrin Dörre-Heinig (2:27:09)
- Wheelchair men: George Vandamme (1:44:10)
- Wheelchair women: Rose Hill (2:03:05)

The 1993 London Marathon was the 13th running of the annual marathon race in London, United Kingdom, which took place on Sunday, 18 April. The elite men's race was won by home athlete Eamonn Martin in a time of 2:10:50 hours and the women's race was won by Germany's Katrin Dörre-Heinig in 2:27:09.

In the wheelchair races, Belgium's George Vandamme (1:44:10) and Britain's Rose Hill (2:03:05) set course records in the men's and women's divisions, respectively. Vandamme's time was a significant improvement on the old record, knocking over seven and a half minutes off it.

Around 68,000 people applied to enter the race, of which 35,820 had their applications accepted and around 25,000 started the race. A total of 24,495 runners finished the race.

== Results ==
=== Men ===
Position	Athlete	Nationality	Time
1st place, gold medalist(s)	Eamonn Martin	United Kingdom	2:10:50
2nd place, silver medalist(s)	Isidro Rico	Mexico	2:10:53
3rd place, bronze medalist(s)	Grzegorz Gajdus	Poland	2:11:07
4	Salvatore Bettiol	Italy	2:11:55
5	Frank Bjørkli	Norway	2:12:23
6	David Buzza	United Kingdom	2:12:24
7	Baek Seung-do	South Korea	2:12:34
8	Hussein Ahmed Salah	Djibouti	2:12:40
9	Juan Ramon Torres	Spain	2:13:44
10	Steve Brace	United Kingdom	2:14:00
11	Thabiso Moqhali	Lesotho	2:14:40
12	Tesfaye Bekele	Ethiopia	2:15:43
13	Omar Abdillahi Charmarke	Djibouti	2:16:00
14	Vladimir Bukhanov	Ukraine	2:16:16
15	Hugh Jones	United Kingdom	2:16:35
16	Ezael Tlhobo	South Africa	2:16:53
17	Vitor Mariano Da Silva	Portugal	2:17:00
18	Martin McLoughlin	United Kingdom	2:17:27
19	Joaquim Silva	Portugal	2:17:30
20	Christopher Buckley	United Kingdom	2:17:42
21	Toshinobu Sato	Japan	2:17:46
22	Terje Naess	Norway	2:17:50
23	Gyula Borka	Hungary	2:18:52
24	Juvenal Ribeiro	Portugal	2:18:56
25	Peter Whitehead	United Kingdom	2:18:57
—	Paul Evans	United Kingdom	DNF
—	Carl Thackery	United Kingdom	DNF

=== Women ===
Position	Athlete	Nationality	Time
1st place, gold medalist(s)	Katrin Dörre-Heinig	Germany	2:27:09
2nd place, silver medalist(s)	Lisa Ondieki	Australia	2:27:27
3rd place, bronze medalist(s)	Liz McColgan	United Kingdom	2:29:37
4	Renata Kokowska	Poland	2:32:30
5	Lorraine Moller	New Zealand	2:32:56
6	Anna Rybicka	Poland	2:34:21
7	Ritva Lemettinen	Finland	2:34:44
8	Alina Ivanova	Russia	2:37:21
9	Galina Zhulyeva	Ukraine	2:41:50
10	Gillian Horovitz	United Kingdom	2:42:14
11	Danielle Sanderson	United Kingdom	2:42:37
12	Zina Marchant	United Kingdom	2:43:59
13	Carolyn Rowe	United Kingdom	2:44:59
14	Susan Clarke	United Kingdom	2:45:13
15	Manuela Dias	Portugal	2:45:28
16	Marianne Fløymo	Norway	2:46:05
17	Sandra Bentley	United Kingdom	2:47:33
18	Lesley Turner	United Kingdom	2:48:20
19	Christina Scobey	United States	2:49:10
20	Marina Vanzulli	Italy	2:49:38
21	Eleanor Robinson	United Kingdom	2:49:59
22	Zoe Lowe	United Kingdom	2:50:05
23	Lucy Ramwell	United Kingdom	2:50:50
24	Janice Moorekite	United Kingdom	2:53:30
25	Sandra Lappage	United Kingdom	2:54:13

=== Wheelchair men ===
Position	Athlete	Nationality	Time
1st place, gold medalist(s)	George Vandamme	Belgium	1:44:10
2nd place, silver medalist(s)	Ivan Newman	United Kingdom	1:46:15
3rd place, bronze medalist(s)	David Holding	United Kingdom	1:51:22
4	Håkan Ericsson	Sweden	1:55:24
5	Huub Nelisse	Netherlands	1:55:34
6	Diet Van Dijk	Netherlands	1:56:15
7	Ian Thompson	United Kingdom	1:57:24
8	Daniel Wesley	Canada	1:59:10
9	David Todd	United Kingdom	1:59:14
10	Iranilson Da Silva	Brazil	1:59:30

=== Wheelchair women ===
Position	Athlete	Nationality	Time
1st place, gold medalist(s)	Rose Hill	United Kingdom	2:03:05
2nd place, silver medalist(s)	Lily Anggreny	Germany	2:09:16
3rd place, bronze medalist(s)	Tanni Grey	United Kingdom	2:12:25
