= 2001 London Marathon =

21st London Marathon

21st London Marathon
- Venue: London, United Kingdom
- Date: 22 April 2001

Champions
- Men: Abdelkader El Mouaziz (2:07:11)
- Women: Paula Radcliffe (2:23:57)
- Wheelchair men: Denis Lemeunier (1:42:37)
- Wheelchair women: Tanni Grey-Thompson (2:13:55)

The 2001 London Marathon was the 21st running of the annual marathon race in London, United Kingdom, which took place on Sunday, 22 April. The elite men's race was won by Morocco's Abdelkader El Mouaziz in a time of 2:07:11 hours and the women's race was won by Ethiopia's Derartu Tulu in 2:23:57.

In the wheelchair races, France's Denis Lemeunier (1:42:37) and Britain's Tanni Grey-Thompson (2:13:55) won the men's and women's divisions, respectively.

Around 92,000 people applied to enter the race, of which 43,517 had their applications accepted and 31,156 started the race. A total of 30,066 runners finished the race, comprising 23,259 men and 6807 women.

== Results ==
=== Men ===
Position	Athlete	Nationality	Time
1st place, gold medalist(s)	Abdelkader El Mouaziz	Morocco	2:07:11
2nd place, silver medalist(s)	Paul Tergat	Kenya	2:08:15
3rd place, bronze medalist(s)	António Pinto	Portugal	2:09:36
4	Tesfaye Jifar	Ethiopia	2:09:45
5	Japhet Kosgei	Kenya	2:10:45
6	Mark Steinle	England	2:10:46
7	Takayuki Inubushi	Japan	2:11:42
8	Abel Antón	Spain	2:11:57
9	Hendrick Ramaala	South Africa	2:12:02
10	Gert Thys	South Africa	2:12:11
11	Mark Hudspith	United Kingdom	2:13:13
12	Joseph Mereng	Kenya	2:13:26
13	Mohamed El Hattab	Morocco	2:14:27
14	Alfred Shemveta	Sweden	2:15:34
15	Erick Wainaina	Kenya	2:15:43
16	Craig Kirkwood	New Zealand	2:16:25
17	Simon Pride	United Kingdom	2:16:27
18	David Makori	Kenya	2:17:09
19	William Burns	Switzerland	2:18:29
20	Robert Holladay	United Kingdom	2:19:26
—	Tesfaye Tola	Ethiopia	DNF
—	Mark Croasdale	United Kingdom	DNF
—	Santtu Mäkinen	Finland	DNF
—	Yakov Tolstikov	Russia	DNF
—	Armando Quintanilla	Mexico	DNF
—	Zebedayo Bayo	Tanzania	DNF
—	Jon Brown	United Kingdom	DNF
—	Luis Soares	France	DNF
—	Paul Evans	United Kingdom	DNF
—	Luís Jesus	Portugal	DNF

=== Women ===
Position	Athlete	Nationality	Time
1st place, gold medalist(s)	Derartu Tulu	Ethiopia	2:23:57
2nd place, silver medalist(s)	Svetlana Zakharova	Russia	2:24:04
3rd place, bronze medalist(s)	Joyce Chepchumba	Kenya	2:24:12
4	Lidia Șimon	Romania	2:24:15
5	Elfenesh Alemu	Ethiopia	2:24:29
6	Nuța Olaru	Romania	2:25:18
7	Alina Ivanova	Russia	2:25:34
8	Tegla Loroupe	Kenya	2:26:10
9	Adriana Fernández	Mexico	2:26:22
10	Madina Biktagirova	Russia	2:27:14
11	Marleen Renders	Belgium	2:28:31
12	Harumi Hiroyama	Japan	2:29:01
13	Lidiya Vasilevskaya	Russia	2:31:36
14	Irina Bogacheva	Kyrgyzstan	2:32:28
15	Teresa Duffy	United Kingdom	2:35:27
16	Lynne MacDougall	United Kingdom	2:37:20
17	Bev Hartigan	United Kingdom	2:37:45
18	Sara Elizabeth Cedillo	Mexico	2:38:53
19	Tania Jones	Canada	2:39:10
20	Mika Adachi	Japan	2:41:35
—	Pamela Chepchumba	Kenya	DNF
—	Michaela McCallum	United Kingdom	DNF

=== Wheelchair men ===
Position	Athlete	Nationality	Time
1st place, gold medalist(s)	Denis Lemeunier	France	1:42:37
2nd place, silver medalist(s)	Kevin Papworth	United Kingdom	1:44:54
3rd place, bronze medalist(s)	David Weir	United Kingdom	1:50:55
4	Tushar Patel	United Kingdom	1:50:56
5	Chris Madden	United Kingdom	1:53:23
6	Richie Powell	United Kingdom	2:02:31
7	Bogdan Krol	Poland	2:06:47
8	Edward Grazier	United Kingdom	2:08:01
9	Mark Telford	United Kingdom	2:08:08
10	John Hanks	United Kingdom	2:09:52

=== Wheelchair women ===
Position	Athlete	Nationality	Time
1st place, gold medalist(s)	Tanni Grey-Thompson	United Kingdom	2:13:55
2nd place, silver medalist(s)	Deborah Brennan	United Kingdom	2:36:50
3rd place, bronze medalist(s)	Mary Rice	Ireland	3:14:37
