= Athletics at the 2000 Summer Paralympics – Men's 100 metres T54 =

Men's 100 metres T54 at the XI Paralympic Games
- Venue: Stadium Australia
- Competitors: 14 from 13 nations
- Winning time: 14.46

Medalists
1st place, gold medalist(s)		Geoff Trappett	Australia
2nd place, silver medalist(s)		Hakan Ericsson	Sweden
3rd place, bronze medalist(s)		David Holding	Great Britain

The men's 100 metres T54 took place in Stadium Australia.

There were two heats and one final round. The T54 is for athletes who have normal hand, arm and trunk function but no function in their legs.

== Heats ==
Qualified for final round

=== Heat 1 ===
Rank	Athlete	Time	Notes
1	Hakan Ericsson (SWE)	14.44	
2	Supachai Koysub (THA)	14.56	
3	Geoff Trappett (AUS)	14.56	
4	Kenny van Weeghel (NED)	15.07	
5	Alexey Ivanov (RUS)	15.43	
6	Carl Marquis (CAN)	15.76	
7	Laurens Molina Sibaja (CRC)	16.13	

=== Heat 2 ===
Rank	Athlete	Time	Notes
1	David Holding (GBR)	14.36	
2	Steffen Woischnik (GER)	14.58	
3	Yoshifumi Nagao (JPN)	14.82	
4	Troy Davis (USA)	15.15	
5	Prasitdhi Thongchuen (THA)	15.23	
6	Cho Hang Duk (KOR)	15.26	
7	Narciso Hernandez (HON)	19.42	

== Final round ==
Rank	Athlete	Time	Notes
1st place, gold medalist(s)	Geoff Trappett (AUS)	14.46	
2nd place, silver medalist(s)	Hakan Ericsson (SWE)	14.51	
3rd place, bronze medalist(s)	David Holding (GBR)	14.61	
4	Supachai Koysub (THA)	14.62	
5	Kenny van Weeghel (NED)	14.95	
6	Steffen Woischnik (GER)	15.10	
7	Yoshifumi Nagao (JPN)	15.16	
8	Troy Davis (USA)	15.19	
