= Pablo Sierra (runner) =

Spanish long-distance runner

Pablo Sierra (born 13 May 1969, also known as Pablo Sierra Hermoso) was a Spanish long-distance runner and a team silver medalist in the 1995 IAAF World Half Marathon Championships.

While in high school in California, Sierra was the high school champion in the 10K. At college in University of Mississippi, he was the 1992 individual Southeastern Conference champion in cross country running, and the fourth-place finisher in the 1993 NCAA Division I Outdoor Track and Field Championships in the 5000 meters.

Sierra was the winner of the 1994 Twin Cities Marathon in 2:11:35 and later was a top competitor in the 1997 London Marathon.

== Early and personal life ==
Sierra was born in Valdelaguna, Spain, but moved to Los Angeles while a teenager. Later, he studied at the University of Mississippi and earned a B.A. in Liberal Arts with an emphasis in ceramics.

After completing his competitive running career, he became a potter and is the subject of the 2018 documentary The Way: The Process of Pablo Sierra. Sierra doesn't purchase his clay, he gathers it from the ground near his workshop in Yocona, Mississippi, for his works.
