= Yocona, Mississippi =

- Unincorporated community
- Location within Mississippi Location within the United States
- Coordinates: 34°16′41″N 89°24′53″W
- Country: United States
- State: Mississippi
- County: Lafayette
- Elevation: 322 ft (98 m)
- Time zone: UTC-6 (Central (CST))
  - Summer (DST): UTC-5 (CDT)
- Area code: 662
- GNIS feature ID: 695229

Yocona is an unincorporated community in Lafayette County, in the U.S. state of Mississippi.

== History ==
Yocona was founded in the late 1840s, and named after the Yocona River. A variant name was "Stringtown".

== Notable person ==
- Pablo Sierra, former long-distance runner
