= Josia Thugwane =

South African long-distance runner

Personal information
- Nationality: South African
- Born: 14 April 1971 (age 55) Bethal, Transvaal

Sport
- Sport: Track and field
- Event: Marathon
Medal record
Men's athletics
Representing South Africa
Olympic Games
Gold medal – first place	1996 Atlanta	Marathon

Josia Thugwane (born 15 April 1971) is a South African retired long-distance runner, best known for winning the gold medal in the marathon at the 1996 Summer Olympics. Thugwane, who is of Ndebele heritage, is the first black athlete to earn an Olympic gold for South Africa.

Born in Bethal, Thugwane ran his first marathon in 1991, but his breakthrough to the international athletics scene came in 1995, when he won the Honolulu Marathon.

Just five months before the Games commenced, Thugwane was carjacked and shot; the bullet grazed his chin, leaving an inch-long scar, and he injured his back as a result of jumping from his moving car. The coalmine that employed him paid for his medical care and rehabilitation.

At Atlanta, in the 1996 Olympic marathon, a large leading pack stayed in contact with each other for most of the race, until at the 35 km mark when Thugwane initiated a break away and he along with Lee Bong-Ju from South Korea and Erick Wainaina from Kenya. They stayed together until entering the stadium, when Thugwane got a slight lead. Thugwane finished three seconds ahead of Lee for the closest Olympic marathon finish ever.

Thugwane had a very successful year in 1997 by winning the Fukuoka Marathon and he won the AIMS Best Marathon Runner Award that year. After that point his career performance dipped. He failed to finish in three successive marathons, and finished only twentieth in the 2000 Sydney Olympic marathon despite top ten finishes in the New York Marathon and London Marathon that year. In 2002 he won the Nagano Olympic Memorial Marathon in Japan.

He was awarded the Silver Order of Ikhamanga, South Africa's second highest cultural honour, in 2011.

== Statistics ==
=== International competition record ===
Year	Competition	Venue	Position	Event	Notes
Representing South Africa
1992	Potsdam–Berlin Ekiden	Potsdam–Berlin, Germany	3rd	5K (4th leg)	14:07
1992	Potsdam–Berlin Ekiden	Potsdam–Berlin, Germany	?	Team	
1995	World Half Marathon Championships	Montbéliard–Belfort, France	5th	Half marathon	1:02:28
1995	World Half Marathon Championships	Montbéliard–Belfort, France	12th	Team	3:12:40
1996	Olympic Games	Atlanta, United States	1st	Marathon	2:12:36
2000	Olympic Games	Sydney, Australia	20th	Marathon	2:16:59
2001	World Championships	Edmonton, Canada	—	Marathon	DNF
2002	World Half Marathon Championships	Brussels, Belgium	30th	Half marathon	1:03:39
2002	World Half Marathon Championships	Brussels, Belgium	4th	Team	3:07:29
2003	World Championships	Paris, France	—	Marathon	DNF

=== Professional races ===
Year	Competition	Venue	Position	Event	Notes
1993	Tiberias Marathon	Tiberias, Israel	3rd	Marathon	2:18:42
1993	Hyper to Hyper Marathon	Pretoria, South Africa	1st	Marathon	2:15:57
1993	Honolulu Marathon	Honolulu, United States	13th	Marathon	2:29:16
1994	Gyeongju International Marathon	Gyeongju, South Korea	28th	Marathon	2:24:52
1994	Chicago Marathon	Chicago, United States	—	Marathon	DNF
1995	Honolulu Marathon	Honolulu, Hawaii	1st	Marathon	2:16:08
1995	New York City Marathon	New York City, United States	—	Marathon	DNF
1996	Fukuoka Marathon	Fukuoka, Japan	—	Marathon	DNF
1997	Fukuoka Marathon	Fukuoka, Japan	1st	Marathon	2:07:28
1997	London Marathon	London, United Kingdom	3rd	Marathon	2:08:06
1998	London Marathon	London, United Kingdom	—	Marathon	DNF
1998	New York City Marathon	New York City, United States	—	Marathon	DNF
1998	Great Scottish Run	Glasgow, United Kingdom	2nd	Half marathon	1:02:47
1998	Great North Run	South Shields, United Kingdom	1st	Half marathon	1:02:32
1999	London Marathon	London, United Kingdom	—	Marathon	DNF
1999	Great Scottish Run	Glasgow, United Kingdom	3rd	Half marathon	1:03:01
1999	Great North Run	South Shields, United Kingdom	17th	Half marathon	1:05:42
1999	Fukuoka Marathon	Fukuoka, Japan	26th	Marathon	2:17:01
2000	London Marathon	London, United Kingdom	8th	Marathon	2:10:29
2000	New York City Marathon	New York City, United States	6th	Marathon	2:15:25
2000	Great Scottish Run	Glasgow, United Kingdom	10th	Half marathon	1:04:32
2000	Lisbon Half Marathon	Glasgow, United Kingdom	11th	Half marathon	1:05:29
2001	Seoul International Marathon	Seoul, South Korea	2nd	Marathon	2:11:52
2001	Honolulu Marathon	Honolulu, United States	—	Marathon	DNF
2002	Nagano Marathon	Nagano, Japan	1st	Marathon	2:13:23
2002	Two Oceans Half Marathon	Cape Town, South Africa	1st	Half marathon	1:04:15
2002	JoongAng Seoul Marathon	Seoul, South Korea	7th	Marathon	2:10:05
2003	Nagano Marathon	Nagano, Japan	2nd	Marathon	2:14:18
2003	Göteborgsvarvet	Gothenburg, Sweden	3rd	Half marathon	1:04:14
2004	Milano City Marathon	Milan, Italy	—	Marathon	DNF
2005	Vienna City Marathon	Vienna, Austria	—	Marathon	DNF
2005	Honolulu Marathon	Honolulu, United States	—	Marathon	DNF
2006	Two Oceans Marathon	Cape Town, South Africa	—	56K	DNF
2006	Warsaw Marathon	Warsaw, Poland	4th	Marathon	2:17:11
2007	Two Oceans Marathon	Cape Town, South Africa	2nd	56K	3:09:46

== National titles ==
- South African Athletics Championships
  - Marathon: 1993, 1996

== See also ==
- List of 1996 Summer Olympics medal winners
- List of African Olympic medalists
- List of marathoners
- List of Olympic medalists in athletics (men)
- List of South African sportspeople
- Marathons at the Olympics
