= Jan Huruk =

Polish long-distance runner

Jan Huruk (born 27 October 1960 in Orsk) is a Polish retired long-distance runner who specialized in the marathon.

== Achievements ==
Year	Competition	Venue	Position	Event	Notes
Representing Poland
1988	Rhein-Ruhr-Marathon	Duisburg, West Germany	1st	Marathon	2:17:11
1989	Berlin Marathon	Berlin, West Germany	6th	Marathon	2:13:12
1990	Marrakech Marathon	Marrakesh, Morocco	1st	Marathon	2:14:29
1990	European Championships	Split, Yugoslavia	—	Marathon	DNF
1991	World Championships	Tokyo, Japan	4th	Marathon	2:15:47
1991	London Marathon	London, United Kingdom	3rd	Marathon	2:10:21
1992	Olympic Games	Barcelona, Spain	7th	Marathon	2:14:32
1992	London Marathon	London, United Kingdom	2nd	Marathon	2:10:07 PB
1994	European Championships	Helsinki, Finland	13th	Marathon	2:14:27

=== Personal bests ===
- 10,000 metres – 28:18.42 minutes (1989)
- Marathon – 2:10.07 hours (1992)
