= George Vandamme =

Belgian wheelchair racer

George Vandamme is a former Belgian wheelchair racer. In 1993, he won the men's wheelchair race of the London Marathon, dominating the race. He set a new course record of 1:44:10, beating the old London course record by nearly eight minutes.
