= Wiesław Perszke =

Polish long-distance runner

Wiesław Perszke (born 18 February 1960 in Jabłonowo Pomorskie, Kuyavian-Pomeranian) is a former long-distance runner from Poland, who represented his native country at the 1992 Summer Olympics in Barcelona, Spain. He set his personal best (2:11:15) in the classic distance in 1993].

== Achievements ==
- All results regarding marathon, unless stated otherwise

Year	Competition	Venue	Position	Notes
Representing Poland
1992	Olympic Games	Barcelona, Spain	21st	2:16:38
1994	European Championships	Helsinki, Finland	34th	2:17:35
