= Mark Steinle =

British long-distance runner

Personal information
- Nationality: British (English)
- Born: 22 November 1974 (age 51) Pembury, England
- Height: 183 cm (6 ft 0 in)
- Weight: 63 kg (139 lb)

Sport
- Sport: Athletics
- Event: Long-distance / Marathon
- Club: Blackheath Harriers

Mark Steinle (born 22 November 1974) is a British long-distance runner. He competed at the 2000 Summer Olympics.

== Biography ==
Steinle became the British 10,000 metres champion after winning the British AAA Championships title at the 1997 AAA Championships.

At the 2000 Olympic Games in Sydney, he represented Great Britain in the men's marathon event.
