= 2007 London Marathon =

Road running event in London, England

27th London Marathon
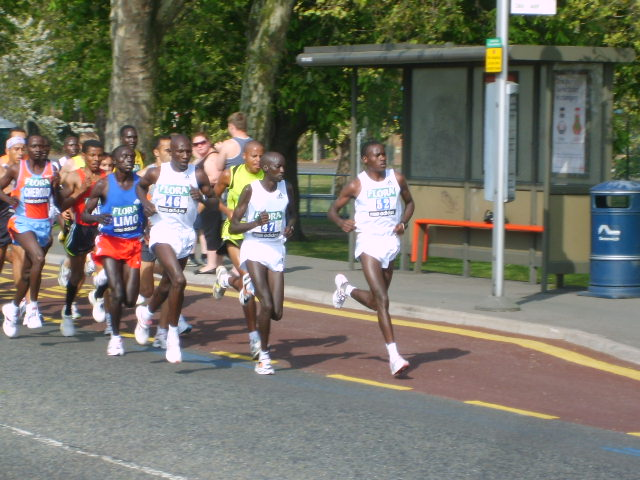
- Leaders during the men's race
- Venue: London, United Kingdom
- Date: 22 April 2007

Champions
- Men: Martin Lel (2:07:41)
- Women: Zhou Chunxiu (2:20:38)
- Wheelchair men: David Weir (1:30:49)
- Wheelchair women: Shelly Woods (1:50:40)

The 2007 London Marathon was the 27th running of the annual marathon race in London, United Kingdom, which took place on Sunday, 22 April. The elite men's race was won by Kenya's Martin Lel in a time of 2:07:41 hours and the women's race was won by China's Zhou Chunxiu in 2:20:38.

In the wheelchair races, Britain's David Weir (1:30:49) and Shelly Woods (1:50:40) won the men's and women's divisions, respectively.

Around 128,000 people applied to enter the race: 50,039 had their applications accepted and 36,396 started the race. A total of 35,667 runners, 24,815 men and 10,852 women, finished the race.

== Results ==
=== Men ===
Position	Athlete	Nationality	Time
1st place, gold medalist(s)	Martin Lel	Kenya	2:07:41
2nd place, silver medalist(s)	Abderrahim Goumri	Morocco	2:07:44
3rd place, bronze medalist(s)	Felix Limo	Kenya	2:07:47
4	Jaouad Gharib	Morocco	2:07:54
5	Hendrick Ramaala	South Africa	2:07:56
6	Paul Tergat	Kenya	2:08:06
7	Ryan Hall	United States	2:08:24
8	Marílson Gomes dos Santos	Brazil	2:08:37
9	Dan Robinson	United Kingdom	2:14:14
10	Andi Jones	United Kingdom	2:17:49
11	Benson Cherono	Kenya	2:18:55
12	Ørjan Lunde	Norway	2:20:21
13	Richard Gardiner	United Kingdom	2:20:26
14	Joe Driscoll	United States	2:20:49
15	John McFarlane	United Kingdom	2:22:18
16	Gareth Raven	United Kingdom	2:23:27
17	Neil Renault	United Kingdom	2:23:44
18	Mark Miles	United Kingdom	2:24:20
19	Darren Bilton	United Kingdom	2:25:10
—	Paul Kimaiyo	Kenya	DNF
—	Patrick Makau Musyoki	Kenya	DNF
—	Wilfred Taragon	Kenya	DNF
—	James Yatich	Kenya	DNF
—	Stephen Kipkoech Kibiwott	Kenya	DNF
—	Steven Kamar	Bahrain	DNF
—	Stefano Baldini	Italy	DNF
—	Haile Gebrselassie	Ethiopia	DNF
—	Meb Keflezighi	United States	DNF
—	Khalid Khannouchi	United States	DNF
—	Juan Carlos de la Ossa	Spain	DNF
—	Hicham Chatt	Morocco	DNF
—	Jason Hartmann	United States	DNF
—	Scott Larson	United States	DNF

=== Women ===
Position	Athlete	Nationality	Time
1st place, gold medalist(s)	Zhou Chunxiu	China	2:20:38
2nd place, silver medalist(s)	Gete Wami	Ethiopia	2:21:45
3rd place, bronze medalist(s)	Constantina Diță	Romania	2:23:55
4	Salina Kosgei	Kenya	2:24:13
5	Lornah Kiplagat	Netherlands	2:24:46
6	Mara Yamauchi	United Kingdom	2:25:41
7	Benita Willis	Australia	2:29:47
8	Liz Yelling	United Kingdom	2:30:44
9	Inga Abitova	Russia	2:34:25
10	Berhane Adere	Ethiopia	2:39:11
11	Eleni Donta	Greece	2:40:42
12	Milka Mikhaylova	Bulgaria	2:44:35
13	Yolanda Mercado	Puerto Rico	2:44:58
14	Nicola Clay	United Kingdom	2:46:25
15	Elke Schmidt	Germany	2:47:09
16	Lizzy Hawker	United Kingdom	2:47:55
17	Jo Kelsey	United Kingdom	2:47:59
18	Karen Natoli	Australia	2:48:23
19	Gillian Laithwaite	United Kingdom	2:48:32
20	Laura Cowley	United Kingdom	2:48:46
—	Galina Bogomolova	Russia	DNF
—	Lyudmila Petrova	Russia	DNF
—	Kiyoko Shimahara	Japan	DNF
—	Kathy Butler	United Kingdom	DNF
—	Blake Russell	United States	DNF
—	Mary Jepkosgei Keitany	Kenya	DNF
—	Irene Kwambai	Kenya	DNF
—	Sylvia Jebiwott Kibet	Kenya	DNF
—	Ruth Kutol	Kenya	DNF
—	Jennifer Chesinon	Kenya	DNF

=== Wheelchair men ===
Position	Athlete	Nationality	Time
1st place, gold medalist(s)	David Weir	United Kingdom	1:30:49
2nd place, silver medalist(s)	Kurt Fearnley	Australia	1:30:50
3rd place, bronze medalist(s)	Saúl Mendoza	Mexico	1:33:46
4	Ernst van Dyk	South Africa	1:33:46
5	Choke Yasuoka	Japan	1:33:50
6	Brian Alldis	United Kingdom	1:44:31
7	Mark Telford	United Kingdom	1:54:18
8	Andrew Cheek	United Kingdom	1:58:14
9	Paul Rea	United Kingdom	2:05:07
10	Wayne Phillips	Canada	2:15:49

=== Wheelchair women ===
Position	Athlete	Nationality	Time
1st place, gold medalist(s)	Shelly Woods	United Kingdom	1:50:40
2nd place, silver medalist(s)	Francesca Porcellato	Italy	1:59:46
3rd place, bronze medalist(s)	Sarah Piercy	United Kingdom	2:41:18
—	Deborah Johnson	United Kingdom	DNF
