= Denis Lemeunier =

French wheelchair racer

Denis Lemeunier (born 12 February 1965) is a French wheelchair racer. He is best known for defeating defending champion Kevin Papworth in the 2001 London Marathon wheelchair race, a feat given that his wheelchair, which normally would take a year to break in, was only 5 weeks old. He competed in the 2004 and 2008 Summer Paralympics, taking a bronze medal in the 4 × 400 metre relay the latter year.
