= Peter Whitehead (runner) =

British athlete

Personal information
- Nationality: British
- Born: 3 December 1964 (age 60)

Sport
- Sport: Long-distance running
- Event: Marathon

Peter Whitehead (born 3 December 1964) is a British long-distance runner. He competed in the men's marathon at the 1996 Summer Olympics.
