= Lawrence Peu =

South African long-distance runner

Personal information
- Nationality: South African
- Born: 13 February 1966 (age 60) Boksburg, South Africa

Sport
- Sport: Long-distance running
- Event: Marathon

Lawrence Peu (born 13 February 1966) is a South African long-distance runner. He competed in the men's marathon at the 1996 Summer Olympics.
