= Steve Moneghetti =

Australian long-distance runner (born 1962)

Personal information
- Full name: Stephen James Moneghetti
- Nationality: Australian
- Born: 26 September 1962 (age 63)
- Height: 176 cm (5 ft 9 in)
- Weight: 60 kg (132 lb)

Sport
- Sport: Marathon running
- Events: 10,000 m, marathon
Medal record
Men's Athletics
Representing Australia
World Championships
Bronze medal – third place	1997 Athens	Marathon
Commonwealth Games
Gold medal – first place	1994 Victoria	Marathon
Silver medal – second place	1990 Auckland	Marathon
Bronze medal – third place	1986 Edinburgh	Marathon
Bronze medal – third place	1998 Kuala Lumpur	10000 m

Stephen James Moneghetti, AM (born 26 September 1962), is an Australian long-distance runner and physical health consultant who has represented Australia on many occasions. He is a personal development consultant with the Ministry of Education and chair of the Victorian Review into Physical and Sport Education in Schools.

== Early life and education ==
Moneghetti was born in Ballarat, Victoria, and was not considered to be a good runner in primary school. When he attempted to join Little Athletics, his father was told that Moneghetti was not wanted. However, by high school (St Patrick's College, Ballarat) he had developed into an excellent endurance athlete and was well on his way to becoming one of Australia's greatest marathon runners.

Moneghetti has a degree in civil engineering, a graduate diploma in education and an honorary doctorate from the University of Ballarat.

== Career ==
Moneghetti started out as a 10,000-metre runner and finished fifth in that event at the 1986 Commonwealth Games. He ran his first marathon at the same meet, winning the bronze medal. His first marathon victory was in Berlin in 1990 with a time of 2:08:16, coming only a couple of weeks after winning the Great North Run in 1:00:34. In 1991 he set the course record of 40:03 for Sydney's iconic 14 km City 2 Surf, which still stands. In 1994, he won the Tokyo Marathon and the marathon at the Commonwealth Games. He came 3rd in the 1997 World Championships marathon race. He has also competed in the marathon at four Olympic Games: 1988 in Seoul, 1992 in Barcelona, 1996 in Atlanta and 2000 in Sydney. His best performance in the Olympics was 5th place at Seoul in 1988.

Moneghetti's last race representing Australia was the Sydney 2000 Olympic Marathon. After meeting trouble in the middle of the race, he recovered to finish 10th. In the interview after the race, he thanked Australia for its support during his long career.

Moneghetti continued to race for fun in other events in Australia such as the city to Surf and Sydney and Melbourne Marathons on an infrequent basis. He is the only male to have won the Sydney City to Surf four times in succession (1988–1991). On 25 July 2010, Moneghetti won the Park2Park 10 km race at Ipswich in Queensland, finishing with a race record time of 32:18. In 2014, he competed in the Oceania Masters Athletics Cross Country Championships hosted in Bendigo. Moneghetti won the event, against strong competition from the likes of future U50 masters world champion Michael Wray.

He lit the cauldron in his hometown of Ballarat to celebrate the Sydney 2000 Olympic Games. He was the mayor of the Commonwealth Games Village at the Melbourne Commonwealth Games in 2006.

In 2010 he was named as the Australian team's chef de mission for the 2010 Commonwealth Games in Delhi, India.

In 2014 he was named a Member of the Order of Australia.

On 24 September 2017 he finished the 44th Berlin Marathon in the time of 3:27:30.

In 2021, he was inducted into Sport Australia Hall of Fame as a general member.

In 2022 Moneghetti ran the fastest ever time for 5000 meters for the 60 and over age category, in 15 minutes and 52 seconds.

== Media ==
Moneghetti appears in the 2012 feature film Reverse Runner. He plays the fictional character John Johns, a retired champion at the 100 metres backwards sprint. The film is a sporting comedy which also features a cameo from sports broadcaster Bruce McAvaney.

== Personal life ==
He is married to Tanya Moneghetti, and they have four children: Emma, Laura, Matthew and Olivia.

Moneghetti's heritage can be traced to the Swiss Italians of Australia.

Sporting positions
Preceded by (South Africa) Matthew Temane	Men's Half Marathon Best Year Performance; 1990	Succeeded by (South Africa) Lawrence Peu
