= Angelina Kanana =

Kenyan long-distance runner

Angelina Kanana (born 16 December 1965) is a retired long-distance runner from Kenya, who represented her native country at the 1996 Summer Olympics in the women's marathon race. There she finished in fifteenth place in the overall rankings. Kanana set her personal best (2:27:24) in the classic distance on 30 April 1995 at the Hamburg Marathon in Hamburg, Germany.

== Achievements ==
Year	Competition	Venue	Position	Event	Notes
Representing Kenya
1994	Hamburg Marathon	Hamburg, Germany	1st	Marathon	2:29:59
1995	Hamburg Marathon	Hamburg, Germany	1st	Marathon	2:27:24
1995	World Championships	Gothenburg, Sweden	—	Marathon	DNF
1996	Olympic Games	Atlanta, United States	15th	Marathon	2:34:19
1997	Cologne Marathon	Cologne, Germany	1st	Marathon	2:27:27
1998	Frankfurt Marathon	Frankfurt, Germany	1st	Marathon	2:31:38
