= Tena Negere =

Ethiopian long-distance runner

Tena Negere (born 5 October 1972) is a retired long-distance runner from Ethiopia, who won the gold medal in the men's marathon at the 1991 All-Africa Games in Cairo, Egypt. He also triumphed in the 1992 edition of the Fukuoka Marathon, clocking 2:09:04 on 6 December 1992. The next year he finished in 34th place (2:29:46) at the 1993 World Championships. He also competed in the men's marathon at the 1992 Summer Olympics.

== Achievements ==
Year	Competition	Venue	Position	Event	Notes
Representing Ethiopia
1992	Fukuoka Marathon	Fukuoka, Japan	1st	Marathon	2:09:04
1993	World Championships	Stuttgart, Germany	34th	Marathon	2:29:46
1994	Venice Marathon	Venice, Italy	1st	Marathon	2:10:50
1995	World Championships	Gothenburg, Sweden	—	Marathon	DNF
