= Kevin Papworth =

British wheelchair racer

Kevin Papworth is a British wheelchair racer. He is best known for winning the 2000 London Marathon, having passed the expected winner, South African Ernst van Dyk, who is the current world record holder for the men's wheelchair marathon, in the final mile of the race.
