= Małgorzata Sobańska =

Polish long-distance runner

Małgorzata Sobańska-Mańkowska (born April 25, 1969, in Poznań, Wielkopolskie) is a retired female long-distance runner from Poland. She twice competed for her native country at the Summer Olympics: in 1996 and 2004.

== Achievements ==
Year	Competition	Venue	Position	Event	Notes
Representing Poland
1995	London Marathon	London, United Kingdom	1st	Marathon	2:27:43
1995	World Championships	Gothenburg, Sweden	4th	Marathon	2:31:10
1996	Olympic Games	Atlanta, United States	11th	Marathon	2:31:52
1998	Cologne Marathon	Cologne, Germany	1st	Marathon	2:29:39
2000	Cologne Marathon	Cologne, Germany	1st	Marathon	2:28:42
2000	Tokyo Marathon	Tokyo, Japan	4th	Marathon	2:27:52
2001	Boston Marathon	Boston, United States	2nd	Marathon	2:26:42
2001	Chicago Marathon	Chicago, United States	4th	Marathon	2:26:08
2001	Tokyo Marathon	Tokyo, Japan	5th	Marathon	2:27:01
2004	Olympic Games	Athens, Greece	17th	Marathon	2:36:43
2006	Toronto Waterfront Marathon	Toronto, Canada	1st	Marathon	2:34:32
2008	Warsaw Marathon	Warsaw, Poland	1st	Marathon	2:31:20

=== Personal bests ===
- 10,000 metres – 33:52.03 (2004)
- Half marathon – 1:11:47 hrs (2008)
- Marathon – 2:26:08 hrs (2001)
