= Heinz Frei =

Swiss Paralympic athlete

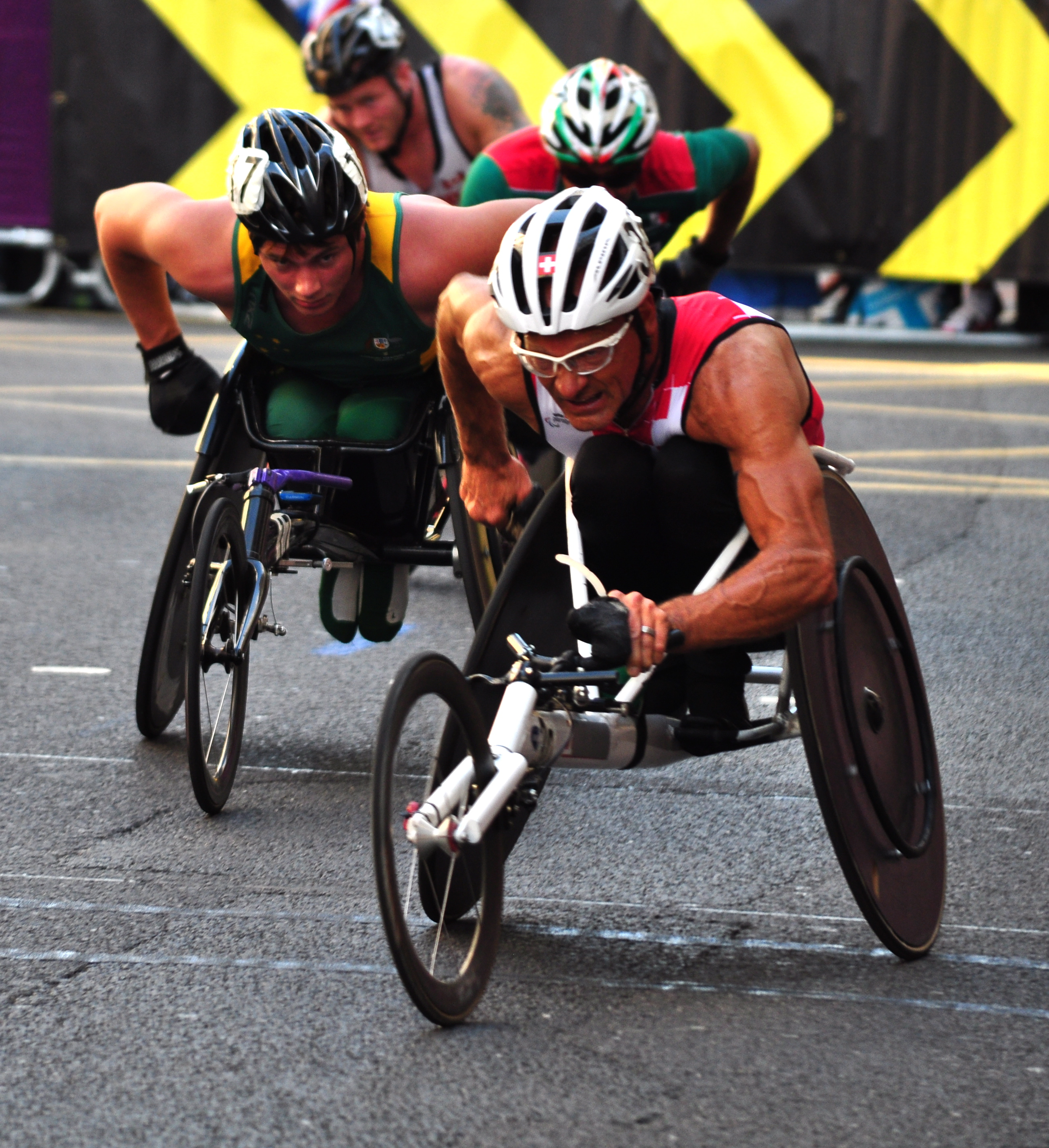
- Frei at the 2012 London Paralympics

Personal information
- Nationality: Swiss
- Born: 28 January 1958 (age 68)

Sport
- Country: Switzerland
- Sport: Athletics, cross-country skiing, and track and road cycling
- Disability class: H3
Medal record
Men's Athletics
Paralympic Games
Gold medal – first place	1984 Stoke Mandeville/New York	1500m
Gold medal – first place	1984 Stoke Mandeville/New York	5000m
Gold medal – first place	1984 Stoke Mandeville/New York	Marathon
Gold medal – first place	1988 Seoul	1500m
Gold medal – first place	1988 Seoul	10000m
Gold medal – first place	1992 Barcelona	800m
Gold medal – first place	1992 Barcelona	5000m
Gold medal – first place	1992 Barcelona	Marathon
Gold medal – first place	1996 Atlanta	1500m
Gold medal – first place	1996 Atlanta	10000m
Gold medal – first place	2000 Sydney	800m
Silver medal – second place	1984 Stoke Mandeville/New York	800m
Silver medal – second place	1988 Seoul	800m
Silver medal – second place	1988 Seoul	5000m
Silver medal – second place	1992 Barcelona	10000m
Silver medal – second place	1996 Atlanta	800m
Silver medal – second place	1996 Atlanta	4×400m relay
Bronze medal – third place	1984 Stoke Mandeville/New York	400m
Bronze medal – third place	1992 Barcelona	4×100m relay
Bronze medal – third place	1996 Atlanta	Marathon
Bronze medal – third place	2000 Sydney	10000m
Bronze medal – third place	2000 Sydney	Marathon
Men's Road cycling
Paralympic Games
Gold medal – first place	2008 Beijing	Time trial
Gold medal – first place	2008 Beijing	Road race
Gold medal – first place	2012 London	Time trial
Bronze medal – third place	2012 London	Team relay
Men's Cross-country skiing
Winter Paralympic Games
Gold medal – first place	1988 Innsbruck	5km short distance
Silver medal – second place	1988 Innsbruck	3x2.5 km relay
Bronze medal – third place	1984 Innsbruck	10km middle distance
Bronze medal – third place	1984 Innsbruck	3×2.5km relay
Bronze medal – third place	1988 Innsbruck	10km long distance
Bronze medal – third place	1992 Albertville/Tignes	3×2.5km relay
Bronze medal – third place	1998 Nagano	10km sitski
Bronze medal – third place	1998 Nagano	15km sitski

Heinz Frei (born 28 January 1958) is a Swiss wheelchair athlete. Frei has won the London Marathon wheelchair race three times, and five medals at the 2003 European games. He won 15 gold medals at the summer and winter Paralympics and is a world record holder in the marathon wheelchair race. He competed in athletics at every Summer Paralympic Games from 1984 to 2008, and at the 2008, 2012 and 2016 Summer Olympics he competed in cycling, using a handcycle. At the Winter Paralympics, he competed in cross-country sit-skiing between 1984 and 2006 and in the biathlon in 1994.

Frei planned to retire from track competition at an event on 28 August 2009, though he will continue competing in road races.

== See also ==
- Athletes with most gold medals in one event at the Paralympic Games
