= Dionicio Cerón =

Mexican long-distance runner

Personal information
- Full name: Dionicio Cerón Pizarro
- Nationality: Mexico
- Born: 9 October 1965 (age 60) Toluca, Mexico
- Height: 1.71 m (5 ft 7 in)
- Weight: 54 kg (119 lb)

Sport
- Sport: Running
- Event(s): 10,000 metres marathon

Dionicio Cerón Pizarro (born October 9, 1965) is a Mexican former marathon runner, whose personal best in the classic distance was 2:08:30. He represented his native country two times at the Summer Olympics: in 1992 and 1996. He also won the London Marathon three consecutive times between 1994 and 1996, the only man to have ever achieved this feat. Eliud Kipchoge, António Pinto and Martin Lel are the only other men to have won it three times or more, however not in consecutive years. In 1990 he won the Peachtree Road Race in Atlanta, and is to date the only Mexican, male or female, to have won this prestigious 10K run.

== Achievements ==
Year	Competition	Venue	Position	Event	Notes
Representing Mexico
1990	Chicago Marathon	Chicago, United States	9th	Marathon	2:12:18
1990	Central American and Caribbean Games	Mexico City, Mexico	1st	10,000 m	29:46.09
1990	Peachtree Road Race	Atlanta, Georgia	1st	10 K	28:23
1991	Rotterdam Marathon	Rotterdam, Netherlands	2nd	Marathon	2:10:02
1992	Olympic Games	Barcelona, Spain	—	Marathon	DNF
1992	Beppu-Ōita Marathon	Beppu-Ōita, Japan	1st	Marathon	2:08:36
1992	Fukuoka Marathon	Fukuoka, Japan	4th	Marathon	2:10:42
1993	Rotterdam Marathon	Rotterdam, Netherlands	1st	Marathon	2:11:06
1993	Central American and Caribbean Games	Ponce, Puerto Rico	1st	10,000 m	28:58.11
1993	Fukuoka Marathon	Fukuoka, Japan	1st	Marathon	2:08:51
1994	London Marathon	London, United Kingdom	1st	Marathon	2:08:53
1994	Fukuoka Marathon	Fukuoka, Japan	16th	Marathon	2:15:23
1995	London Marathon	London, United Kingdom	1st	Marathon	2:08:30
1995	World Championships	Gothenburg, Sweden	2nd	Marathon	2:12:13
1996	London Marathon	London, United Kingdom	1st	Marathon	2:10:00
1997	Boston Marathon	Boston, United States	3rd	Marathon	2:10:59
1997	New York City Marathon	New York City, United States	8th	Marathon	2:13:01
2000	Hokkaido Marathon	Sapporo, Japan	1st	Marathon	2:17:14

Records
Preceded by (United States) Mark Curp	Men's Half Marathon World Record Holder; 16 September 1990 – 3 April 1993	Succeeded by (Kenya) Moses Tanui
