= Mark Hudspith =

English long-distance runner

Personal information
- Nationality: British (English)
- Born: 19 January 1969 (age 57) Tynemouth, England

Sport
- Sport: Athletics
- Event: Long-distance
- Club: Morpeth AC
Medal record
Men's athletics
Representing England
Commonwealth Games
Bronze medal – third place	1994 Victoria	Men's Marathon

Mark Edward Hudspith (born 19 January 1969) is a male English former long-distance runner.

== Biography ==
Hudspith studied at Durham University. He achieved a personal best time of 2:11:58 in London on 2 April 1995.

Hudspith represented England and won the bronze medal in the Marathon at the 1994 Commonwealth Games in Victoria, Canada. At the time he was the first British athlete to win a major championship medal in the marathon in 10 years, since Charlie Spedding won bronze at the 1984 Olympics in Los Angeles. He represented England again at the 2002 Commonwealth Games.

Hudspith was three-times British marathon champion by virtue of being the highest placed British athlete in the London marathon and therefore taking the AAA Championships title in 1998, 1999 and 2000.

His brother Ian Hudspith won the 10,000 metres event at the 1997 British Athletics Championships.
