= Renata Kokowska =

Polish long-distance runner

Renata Kokowska (born 4 December 1958 in Głubczyn) is a former long-distance runner from Poland, who is a triple winner of the Berlin Marathon: 1988, 1991 and 1993. In 1990 she triumphed in the Amsterdam Marathon. She is a two-time national champion in the women's 5.000 metres.

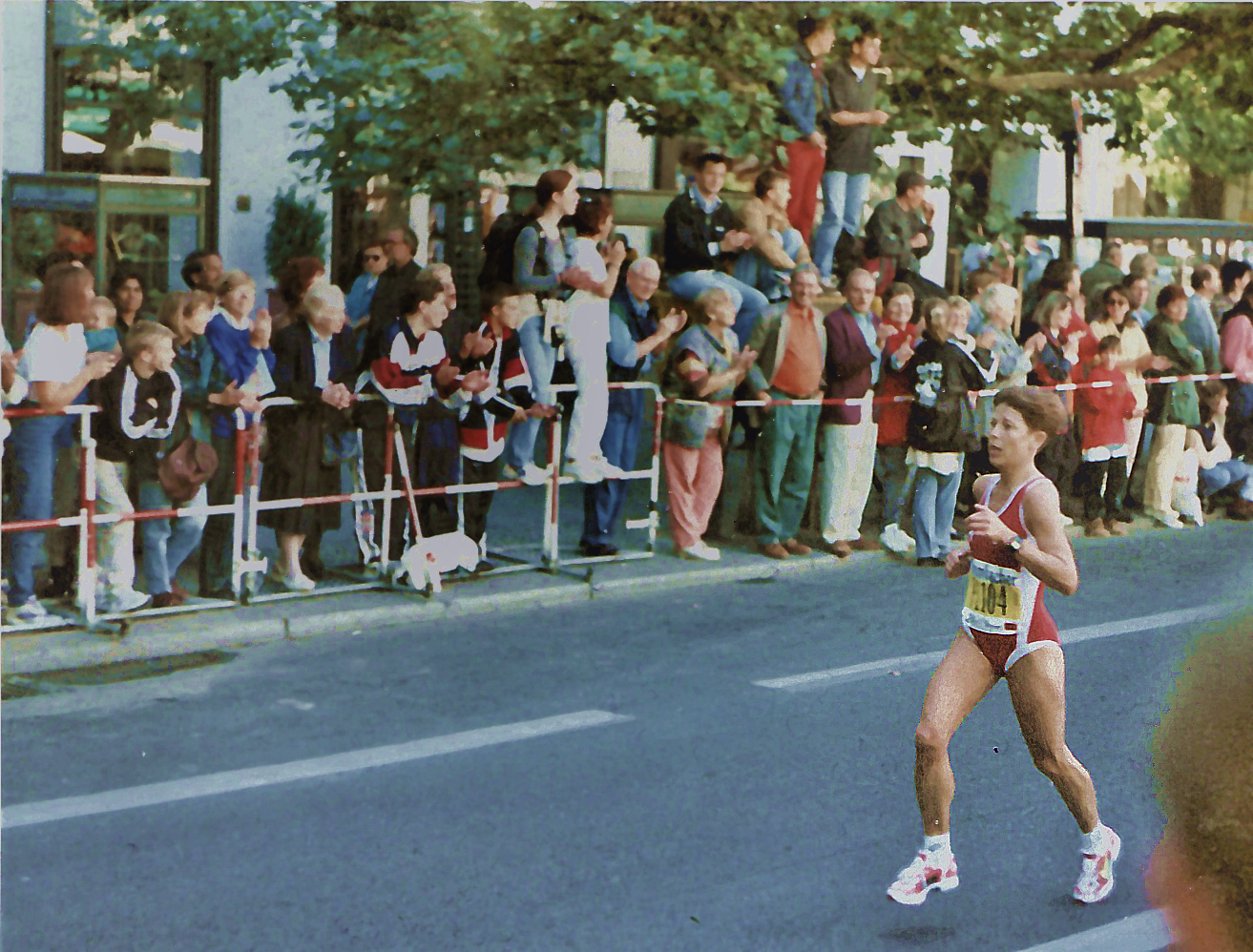

== Achievements ==
- All results regarding marathon, unless stated otherwise

Year	Competition	Venue	Position	Notes
Representing Poland
1988	Berlin Marathon	Berlin, West Germany	1st	2:29:16
1990	Amsterdam Marathon	Amsterdam, Netherlands	1st	2:35:31
1991	Berlin Marathon	Berlin, Germany	1st	2:27:36
1993	Berlin Marathon	Berlin, Germany	1st	2:26:20
