= Eamonn Martin =

British athlete

Personal information
- Nationality: British (English)
- Born: 9 October 1958 (age 67) Basildon, Essex, England
- Height: 183 cm (6 ft 0 in)
- Weight: 67 kg (148 lb)

Sport
- Sport: Athletics
- Events: cross-country; five miles; 5,000m; 10,000; marathon
- Club: Basildon AC
Medal record
Athletics
Representing England
Commonwealth Games
Gold medal – first place	1990 Auckland	10,000m

Eamonn Thomas Martin (born 9 October 1958) is an English former long distance runner who competed at three Olympic Games.

== Biography ==
Martin is the most recent British male winner of the London Marathon, having won the 1993 race in a sprint finish against the Mexican athlete Isidro Rico in a time of 2:10:50. The race was Martin's debut marathon and he went on to win the Chicago Marathon in 1995, in a time of 2:11:18.

On 24 March 1973, the then 14-year-old Martin won the Junior title at the English Schools Athletics Association Cross-Country Championships. Steve Ovett, exactly three years older than Martin, was runner-up in the Senior title. Martin went on to compete at the top level in track, cross country, and road racing. He was the National Cross-Country Champion in 1984 and 1992 and he won the Belfast International Cross Country race in 1991. He competed at the 1984 and 1988 Summer Olympics, finishing thirteenth in the 5000-metre final in 1984, and dropping out of the 10,000-metre final in 1988.

He represented England at the 1990 Commonwealth Games in Auckland, New Zealand, winning a gold medal in the 10,000 metres event in a time of 28:08.56. Four years later he represented England at the 1994 Commonwealth Games in Victoria, Canada.

Martin was a three-time British 5000 metres champion after winning the British AAA Championships titles in 1988, 1990 and 1991 and twice British 10,000 metres champion after winning the British AAA Championships titles in 1989 and 1992.

As of 2014, Martin worked for Horiba Mira Ltd. Formerly, he was a test engineer for Ford Motor Company's Dunton Technical Centre. In 1993, his son was born. He also has two daughters.

== International competitions ==
Year	Competition	Venue	Position	Event	Notes
Representing the United Kingdom
1990	European Championships	Split, Yugoslavia	13th	5000m	13:34.62

== Professional marathons ==
Year	Competition	Venue	Position	Event	Notes
1993	London Marathon	London, United Kingdom	1st	Marathon	2:10:50
1994	London Marathon	London, United Kingdom	8th	Marathon	2:11:05
1995	London Marathon	London, United Kingdom	13th	Marathon	2:12:44
1995	Chicago Marathon	Chicago, United States	1st	Marathon	2:11:18
1996	Chicago Marathon	Chicago, United States	4th	Marathon	2:11:21
1997	London Marathon	London, United Kingdom	13th	Marathon	2:12:29
