= Joyce Chepchumba =

Kenyan long-distance runner (born 1970)

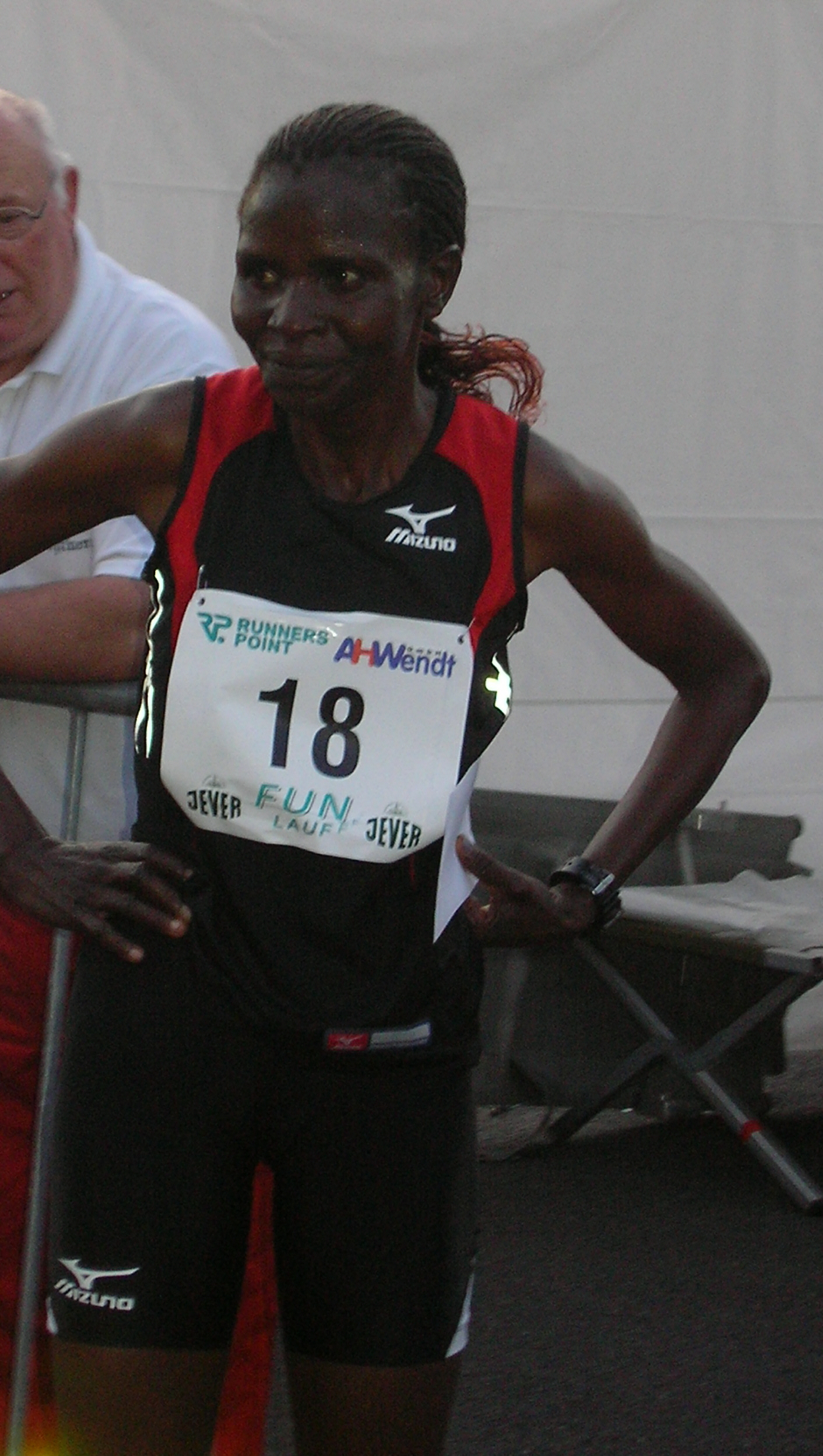

Medal record

Women's Athletics

Representing Kenya

Olympic Games
Bronze medal – third place	2000 Sydney	Marathon

Joyce Chepchumba (born 6 November 1970 in Kericho) is a long distance athlete from Kenya, who won a bronze medal in marathon at the 2000 Summer Olympics.

== Achievements ==
- 1995
  - Tilburg Ten Miles winner
  - Parelloop 10Kwinner
- 1997
  - London Marathon winner
- 1998
  - Chicago Marathon winner
- 1999
  - London Marathon winner
  - Chicago Marathon winner
  - Berlin Half Marathon winner
  - Great North Run winner
- 2000
  - Tokyo International Women's Marathon winner
  - 2000 Summer Olympics bronze medallist
  - Berlin Half Marathon winner
- 2001
  - Berlin Half Marathon winner
- 2002
  - New York City Marathon winner
- 2004
  - Lisbon Half Marathon winner
  - Berlin Half Marathon winner
