= Rose Hill (athlete) =

British wheelchair athlete

- Born: 1956 (age 68–69)
- Occupation: wheelchair athlete

Rose Hill (born c. 1956) is a British wheelchair athlete.

== Biography ==
Hill was left using a wheelchair following a road accident in about 1979. She began racing marathons in order to raise money for hospital beds specially designed for paraplegics. She completed her first marathon in Abingdon, Oxfordshire, fast enough to qualify for the London Marathon. It was after finishing the 1991 London race that she decided to become a serious marathoner.

In 1993, she beat defending London Marathon champion and race favourite Tanni Grey and set a new course record of 2:03:05. The next year she was edged out by Grey during a sprint to the finish line, but returned in 1995 to win her second London Marathon.

Shortly after winning the 1993 London Marathon, Hill broke the British women's wheelchair marathon record in Switzerland with a time of 1:43:52. She competed in the 1992 and 1996 Summer Paralympics, taking a silver medal in the 4×100 metre relay the earlier year.

She was coached by Peter Eriksson and used racing to raise money for organizations such as Motability.
