= Paul Evans (runner) =

British athlete

Personal information
- Nationality: British (English)
- Born: 13 April 1961 (age 65) Glasgow, Scotland
- Height: 183 cm (6 ft 0 in)
- Weight: 64 kg (141 lb)

Sport
- Sport: Athletics
- Event: Long-distance
- Club: Belgrave Harriers; City of Norwich AC

Paul William Evans (born 13 April 1961) is a former distance runner from England, who competed at the 1992 Barcelona Olympics and 1996 Atlanta Olympics.

== Biography ==
He took up running at 25, having been a footballer. He was a member of Belgrave Harriers and the City of Norwich Athletics Club.

At the 1992 Olympic Games in Barcelona, he represented Great Britain in the 10,000 metres event and reached the track final. Four years later at the 1996 Olympic Games in Atlanta, he represented Great Britain, again in the 10,000 metres.

Evans came second in the 1996 Great North Run, third in the 1996 London Marathon, and won the 1996 Chicago Marathon at the age of 35. His 2:08:52 in Chicago places him fifth on the UK all-time marathon list. Other achievements include a half-marathon best time of 61:18, and a course record in the premier Swedish 30 km cross country running race Lidingöloppet in 1995.

Evans was twice the British 10,000 metres champion after winning the British AAA Championships title at the 1993 AAA Championships and the 1999 AAA Championships.

He is now athletics development officer for Norfolk.

== Achievements ==
Year	Competition	Venue	Position	Event	Notes
Representing England and Great Britain
1991	Lisbon Half Marathon	Lisbon, Portugal	1st	Half marathon	1:01:44
1991	Italian Marathon	Carpi, Emilia-Romagna, Italy	9th	Marathon	2:12:53
1992	London Marathon	London, United Kingdom	5th	Marathon	2:10:36
1992	World Half Marathon Championships	Newcastle, United Kingdom	10th	Half marathon	1:01:38
1993	Reading Half Marathon	Reading, United Kingdom	1st	Half marathon	1:01:38
1993	New York City Marathon	New York City, United States	7th	Marathon	2:13:36
1995	London Marathon	London, United Kingdom	5th	Marathon	2:10:31
1995	New York City Marathon	New York City, United States	2nd	Marathon	2:11:05
1996	London Marathon	London, United Kingdom	3rd	Marathon	2:10:40
1996	Chicago Marathon	Chicago, United States	1st	Marathon	2:08:52
1997	London Marathon	London, United Kingdom	8th	Marathon	2:09:18
1997	Chicago Marathon	Chicago, United States	6th	Marathon	2:09:20
1999	Edinburgh Marathon	Edinburgh, Scotland	4th	Marathon	2:17:35
2001	Chicago Marathon	Chicago, United States	23rd	Marathon	2:18:35
