= António Pinto (runner) =

Portuguese long-distance runner

Medal record

Men's athletics

Representing Portugal

European Championships
Gold medal – first place	1998 Budapest	10,000 m

António Coelho Pinto (born 22 March 1966) is a retired Portuguese long-distance runner. He was born in Vila Garcia, Amarante.

Pinto won the London Marathon in 1992, 1997 and 2000, as well as the 10,000 metres final at the 1998 European Championships in Athletics in Budapest, Hungary. Pinto's best time in the marathon is 2:06:36. He competed in four consecutive Summer Olympics for his native country, beginning in 1988. He also won the Lisbon Half Marathon 1998. He retired in 2002.

== Achievements ==
Year	Competition	Venue	Position	Event	Notes
Representing Portugal
1990	European Championships	Split, Yugoslavia	14th	10,000m	28:26.68
1991	Italian Marathon	Carpi, Italy	7th	Marathon	2:12:39
1992	London Marathon	London, United Kingdom	1st	Marathon	2:10:02
1994	Paris Marathon	Paris, France	2nd	Marathon	2:10:58
1994	European Championships	Helsinki, Finland	9th	Marathon	2:13:24
1994	Berlin Marathon	Berlin, Germany	1st	Marathon	2:08:31
1995	London Marathon	London, United Kingdom	3rd	Marathon	2:08:48
1995	Berlin Marathon	Berlin, Germany	3rd	Marathon	2:08:57
1996	Tokyo Marathon	Tokyo, Japan	2nd	Marathon	2:08:38
1996	Olympic Games	Atlanta, United States	14th	Marathon	2:16:41
1997	London Marathon	London, United Kingdom	1st	Marathon	2:07:55
1997	World Championships	Athens, Greece	—	Marathon	DNF
1998	Lisbon Half Marathon	Lisbon, Portugal	1st	Half marathon	59:43
1998	London Marathon	London, United Kingdom	3rd	Marathon	2:08:13
1998	European Championships	Budapest, Hungary	1st	10,000m	27:12.47
1998	Fukuoka Marathon	Fukuoka, Japan	13th	Marathon	2:12:28
1999	London Marathon	London, United Kingdom	2nd	Marathon	2:09:00
2000	London Marathon	London, United Kingdom	1st	Marathon	2:06:36
2000	Olympic Games	Sydney, Australia	11th	Marathon	2:15:17
2000	Great Scottish Run	Glasgow, Scotland	1st	Half Marathon	1:02:04
2001	London Marathon	London, United Kingdom	3rd	Marathon	2:09:36
2002	London Marathon	London, United Kingdom	7th	Marathon	2:09:10

Records
Preceded by (Portugal) Fernando Mamede	Men's 10,000m European Record Holder; July 30, 1999 – September 3, 1999	Succeeded by (Belgium) Mohammed Mourhit
Preceded by (Portugal) Carlos Lopes	Men's Marathon European Record Holder; April 16, 2000 – March 20, 2016	Succeeded by (Turkey) Kaan Kigen Özbilen
