= David Holding =

British wheelchair racer (born 1968)

Personal information
- Nationality: British
- Born: 1968 (age 57–58)
Medal record
Representing Great Britain
Para athletics
Paralympic Games
Gold medal – first place	1996 Atlanta	100m T53
Bronze medal – third place	1996 Atlanta	200m T53
Bronze medal – third place	2000 Sydney	100m T54

David Holding (born 1968) is a British wheelchair athlete. Holding was born with spina bifida, a birth defect that affects the spinal cord, and has been in a wheelchair since childhood. An accountant by training, he competes as an amateur athlete in wheelchair races of all distances. He has won a number of races, but is most well known for being a four-time winner of the London Marathon and the former world record holder, and a Paralympic Games gold medal winner in the 100 meter wheelchair race.

He competed in four Summer Paralympic Games, from 1992 to 2004, in events ranging from the 100 meters to the marathon. In addition to his gold in the 100m T53 at Atlanta 1996, he also won two bronze medals: In the 200m T53 in 1996, and in the 100m T54 at Sydney 2000.

At the 2004 Athens Paralympics, Holding made the final for both the 100m and 200m in the T54 class, but missed out on a medal, finishing fourth and eighth respectively.

Holding is a patron of the National Association for Bikers with a Disability.
