= Australasian Athletics Championships =

The Australasian Athletics Championships was an athletics competition between male athletes principally from Australia and New Zealand that was held between 1893 and 1927. They were the precursor to the national Australian Athletics Championships, which replaced the competition from 1930 onwards.

The competition emerged from an inter-colonial athletics event in 1890 between New South Wales, Victoria, Queensland and New Zealand before becoming a formalised event. This marked a progression towards organised sports competition among the emerging colonial regions in the British Empire and occurred at the same time as the Sheffield Shield cricket developed into a formal regional tournament. An Australasian Championships in tennis for the colonies was established in 1905 and would later become the Australian Open.

During the same period, athletics organisers of the region began to cooperate more and the Amateur Athletic Union of Australasia (AAUA) was established in 1897. This became the basis for the modern-day national federation, Athletics Australia, after New Zealand split in 1928. Sports cooperation between Australia and New Zealand also resulted in a combined national team being sent as Australasia at the Olympics in 1908 and 1912.

The main base of the athletics programme consisted of track and field events measured in imperial units. The first edition in 1893 featured ten track events and five field events for men. The track events were three sprints, two middle-distance races, a 3-mile long-distance race, two hurdling events, and two track walking events. On the field, there were high jump, long jump, pole vault, shot put and hammer throw. The programme remained in this format until 1922, when three new events were added (javelin throw, discus throw, and mile medley relay). A decathlon was held for three editions from 1924 onwards and a men's triple jump was contested in 1927 only. A marathon event was included on the programme in 1909 and the prominence of the event marked the growing importance of the newly developed distance in the region.

Among the winners during the competition's lifespan were three-time Olympic sprint athlete Stan Rowley, 1908 Olympic race walk medalist Harry Kerr, sprinter Nigel Barker and hurdler George William Smith.

== Editions ==
Key

Precursor inter-colonial competition

Ed.	Year	City	Country	No. of events
—	1890	Sydney	Australia	11
1st	1893	Melbourne	Australia	15
2nd	1896	Christchurch	New Zealand	15
3rd	1897	Sydney	Australia	15
4th	1899	Brisbane	Australia	15
5th	1901	Auckland	New Zealand	15
6th	1904	Melbourne	Australia	15
7th	1905	Sydney	Australia	15
8th	1908	Hobart	Australia	15
9th	1909	Brisbane	Australia	16
10th	1911	Wellington	New Zealand	15
11th	1914	Melbourne	Australia	15
12th	1920	Sydney	Australia	15
13th	1922	Adelaide	Australia	18
14th	1924	Hobart	Australia	19
15th	1926	Brisbane	Australia	19
16th	1927	Wellington	New Zealand	20

== Champions ==
=== 100 yards ===
- 1890: Jack Hempton (NZL)
- 1893: Bill MacPherson (AUS)
- 1896: Bill Cartwright (AUS)
- 1897: Stan Rowley (AUS)
- 1899: Stan Rowley (AUS)
- 1901: George Moir (AUS)
- 1904: Herb Hunter (AUS)
- 1905: Nigel Barker (AUS)
- 1908: Nigel Barker (AUS)
- 1909: William Woodger (NZL)
- 1911: Ron Opie (NZL)
- 1914: George Parker (USA)
- 1920: William Hunt (AUS)
- 1922: Slip Carr (AUS)
- 1924: Les Parker (AUS)
- 1926: Les Parker (AUS)
- 1927: Jim Carlton (AUS)

=== 220 yards ===
- 1890: Bill MacPherson (AUS)
- 1893: Bill MacPherson (AUS)
- 1896: Bill Cartwright (AUS)
- 1897: Stan Rowley (AUS)
- 1899: Stan Rowley (AUS)
- 1901: George Moir (AUS)
- 1904: Nigel Barker (AUS)
- 1905: Nigel Barker (AUS)
- 1908: Nigel Barker (AUS)
- 1909: William Woodger (NZL)
- 1911: Ron Opie (NZL)
- 1914: George Parker (USA)
- 1920: William Hunt (AUS)
- 1922: Slip Carr (AUS)
- 1924: Norman Grehan (AUS)
- 1926: Norman Grehan (AUS)
- 1927: Jim Carlton (AUS)

=== 440 yards ===
- 1890: Bill MacPherson (AUS)
- 1893: Bill MacPherson (AUS)
- 1896: W. Low (NZL)
- 1897: Charles Campbell (AUS)
- 1899: William Shea (AUS)
- 1901: A. Oxlade (AUS)
- 1904: Nigel Barker (AUS)
- 1905: Nigel Barker (AUS)
- 1908: Nigel Barker (AUS)
- 1909: Nigel Barker (AUS)
- 1911: Ron Opie (NZL)
- 1914: George Parker (USA)
- 1920: Bart Linehan (AUS)
- 1922: William Hutton (AUS)
- 1924: Les Tracy (NZL)
- 1926: Roy Norman (AUS)
- 1927: Charles Stuart (AUS)

=== 880 yards ===
- 1890: Neil Ferguson (AUS)
- 1893: Ken McCrae (AUS)
- 1896: Ernest Corner (AUS)
- 1897: Charles Campbell (AUS)
- 1899: D'Arcy Wentworth (AUS)
- 1901: D'Arcy Wentworth (AUS)
- 1904: Harvey Sutton (AUS)
- 1905: Greg Wheatley (AUS)
- 1908: W. Trembath (NZL)
- 1909: Greg Wheatley (AUS)
- 1911: Guy Harding (NZL)
- 1914: Russell Watson (AUS)
- 1920: Reg Piggott (AUS)
- 1922: Charles Taylor (NZL)
- 1924: William Whyte (AUS)
- 1926: William Whyte (AUS)
- 1927: Charles Stuart (AUS)

=== Mile run ===
- 1890: Peter Morrison (NZL)
- 1893: Edwin Flack (AUS)
- 1896: W. Bennett (NZL)
- 1897: William Cumming (AUS)
- 1899: D'Arcy Wentworth (AUS)
- 1901: William Simpson (NZL)
- 1904: Harvey Sutton (AUS)
- 1905: Greg Wheatley (AUS)
- 1908: Alfred Clemes (AUS)
- 1909: Greg Wheatley (AUS)
- 1911: George Hill (NZL)
- 1914: John Power (USA)
- 1920: William Brown (AUS)
- 1922: Jack Newman (AUS)
- 1924: Randolph Rose (NZL)
- 1926: George Hyde (AUS)
- 1927: Randolph Rose (NZL)

=== Three miles ===
- 1890: Peter Morrison (NZL)
- 1893: Charles Herbert (AUS)
- 1896: A. Bell (NZL)
- 1897: William Cumming (AUS)
- 1899: P. Malthus (NZL)
- 1901: William Simpson (NZL)
- 1904: Rufus Ferguson (AUS)
- 1905: William Steele (AUS)
- 1908: S. Sharp (NZL)
- 1909: Miles Dickson (NZL)
- 1911: George Hill (NZL)
- 1914: James Beatson (NZL)
- 1920: Harry Grandemange (AUS)
- 1922: Reg Webber (NZL)
- 1924: Randolph Rose (NZL)
- 1926: George Hyde (AUS)
- 1927: Randolph Rose (NZL)

=== 120 yards hurdles ===
- 1890: Robert Lusk (NZL)
- 1893: Harry Davis (AUS)
- 1896: W. Martin (NZL)
- 1897: J. Laidlaw (AUS)
- 1899: Corrie Gardner (AUS)
- 1901: George William Smith (NZL)
- 1904: George William Smith (NZL)
- 1905: Colin Stewart (AUS)
- 1908: John Davis (AUS)
- 1909: Gerald Keddell (NZL)
- 1911: Gerald Keddell (NZL)
- 1914: Les Wallman (AUS)
- 1920: Harry Wilson (NZL)
- 1922: Leslie Edmunds (AUS)
- 1924: Robert Almond (AUS)
- 1926: Ernest Scott (AUS)
- 1927: Roger Lander (NZL)

=== 440 yards hurdles ===
- 1893: David Matson (NZL)
- 1896: W. Martin (NZL)
- 1897: Arthur Holder (NZL)
- 1899: George William Smith (NZL)
- 1901: George William Smith (NZL)
- 1904: George William Smith (NZL)
- 1905: Francis Brown (AUS)
- 1908: Henry St. Aubin Murray (NZL)
- 1909: Gerald Keddell (NZL)
- 1911: Gerald Keddell (NZL)
- 1914: Russell Watson (AUS)
- 1920: Leslie Edmunds (AUS)
- 1922: Francis Edwards (AUS)
- 1924: Richard Honner (AUS)
- 1926: Alf Watson (AUS)
- 1927: Francis Nesdale (NZL) & Stan Ramson (NZL)

=== High jump ===
- 1890: E. Kellett (AUS)
- 1893: W. Cole (AUS)
- 1896: James Doyle (AUS)
- 1897: P. English (AUS)
- 1899: P. English (AUS)
- 1901: C. Laurie (NZL)
- 1904: P. English (AUS)
- 1905: Tim Frawley (AUS)
- 1908: Charles Orbell (NZL)
- 1909: John Smith (AUS)
- 1911: Lester Kelly (AUS)
- 1914: Lester Kelly (AUS)
- 1920: Harold Harbison (AUS)
- 1922: Roy Harbison (AUS)
- 1924: Laurence Mason (AUS)
- 1926: Laurence Mason (AUS)
- 1927: Ewen Davidson (AUS)

=== Pole vault ===
- 1893: J. Gleeson (AUS)
- 1896: H. Kingsley (NZL)
- 1897: Hori Eruera (NZL)
- 1899: James Te Paa (NZL)
- 1901: C. Laurie (NZL)
- 1904: C. Laurie (NZL)
- 1905: R. Adams (AUS)
- 1908: Len McKay (NZL)
- 1909: Len McKay (NZL) & L. Walker (AUS)
- 1911: John Brake (AUS)
- 1914: John Brake (AUS) & Richard Templeton (USA)
- 1920: George Harvey (NZL)
- 1922: Roy Harbison (AUS)
- 1924: Roy Harbison (AUS)
- 1926: Norman Shaddock (AUS)
- 1927: Eino Keskinen (AUS)

=== Long jump ===
- 1890: Leonard Cuff (NZL)
- 1893: W. Cole (AUS)
- 1896: J. Ryan (NZL)
- 1897: David Bevan (AUS)
- 1899: P. English (AUS)
- 1901: Herb Hunter (AUS)
- 1904: H. Duigan (AUS)
- 1905: Nigel Barker (AUS)
- 1908: John Davis (AUS)
- 1909: John Smith (AUS)
- 1911: Ethelbert Southee (AUS)
- 1914: John Smith (AUS)
- 1920: Richard Honner (AUS)
- 1922: Richard Honner (AUS)
- 1924: Richard Honner (AUS)
- 1926: Hubert Day (AUS)
- 1927: Charles Ebert (AUS)

=== Triple jump ===
- 1927: John Shirley (NZL)

=== Shot put ===
- 1893: Timothy O'Connor (NZL)
- 1896: W. Rhodes (NZL)
- 1897: P. English (AUS)
- 1899: George Hawkes (AUS)
- 1901: William O'Reilly (AUS)
- 1904: William O'Reilly (AUS)
- 1905: William O'Reilly (AUS)
- 1908: William O'Reilly (AUS)
- 1909: William O'Reilly (AUS)
- 1911: D. McGrath (AUS)
- 1914: Edward Caughey (USA)
- 1920: Peter Munro (NZL)
- 1922: Leslie Rouse (AUS)
- 1924: Peter Munro (NZL)
- 1926: Alex McIntosh (AUS)
- 1927: Peter Munro (NZL)

=== Discus throw ===
- 1922: A. West (AUS)
- 1924: Peter Munro (NZL)
- 1926: Roy Thomson (AUS)
- 1927: Peter Munro (NZL)

=== Hammer throw ===
- 1893: Timothy O'Connor (NZL)
- 1896: R. Martin (NZL)
- 1897: J. Milward (AUS)
- 1899: W. Madill (NZL)
- 1901: William O'Reilly (AUS)
- 1904: William O'Reilly (AUS)
- 1905: William O'Reilly (AUS)
- 1908: William O'Reilly (AUS)
- 1909: William O'Reilly (AUS)
- 1911: D. McGrath (AUS)
- 1914: Jack McHolm (NZL)
- 1920: Jack McHolm (NZL)
- 1922: Leslie Rouse (AUS)
- 1924: Jack McHolm (NZL)
- 1926: William Harvey (NZL)
- 1927: William Harvey (NZL)

=== Javelin throw ===
- 1922: Alf Reid (AUS)
- 1924: Dennis Duigan (AUS)
- 1926: Stan Lay (NZL)
- 1927: Stan Lay (NZL)

=== Decathlon ===
- 1924: Dennis Duigan (AUS)
- 1926: Max Kroger (AUS)
- 1927: Eino Keskinen (AUS)

=== One mile walk ===
- 1890: E. McKelvey (NZL)
- 1893: A. Bullock (AUS)
- 1896: Frank Creamer (NZL)
- 1897: Dave Wilson (NZL)
- 1899: C. McAffar (NZL)
- 1901: Dave Wilson (NZL)
- 1904: Arthur Barrett (AUS)
- 1905: L. Pomeroy (AUS)
- 1908: Harry Kerr (NZL)
- 1909: Harry Kerr (NZL)
- 1911: Harry Kerr (NZL)
- 1914: Alfred Pickard (AUS)
- 1920: George Parker (AUS)
- 1922: George Parker (AUS)
- 1924: Ernie Austen (AUS)
- 1926: George Parker (AUS)
- 1927: Ernie Austen (AUS)

=== Three mile walk ===
- 1890: E. McKelvey (NZL)
- 1893: Arthur Barrett (AUS)
- 1896: Frank Creamer (NZL)
- 1897: Dave Wilson (NZL)
- 1899: Peter Corrigan (AUS)
- 1901: Dave Wilson (NZL)
- 1904: Arthur Barrett (AUS)
- 1905: L. Pomeroy (AUS)
- 1908: Harry Kerr (NZL)
- 1909: Harry Kerr (NZL)
- 1911: Harry Kerr (NZL)
- 1914: Alfred Pickard (AUS)
- 1920: George Parker (AUS)
- 1922: George Parker (AUS)
- 1924: Ernie Austen (AUS)
- 1926: George Parker (AUS)
- 1927: Bill Lankey (NZL)

=== One mile relay ===
- 1922: South Africa (RSA)
- 1924: Victoria (VIC)
- 1926: Victoria (VIC)
- 1927: New South Wales (NSW)
