= Athletics at the 1920 Summer Olympics – Men's 3000 metres walk =

Athletics at the Olympics

Men's 3 kilometres walk at the Games of the VII Olympiad
- Venue: Olympisch Stadion
- Dates: August 20–21, 1920
- Competitors: 22 from 12 nations

Medalists
1st place, gold medalist(s)		Ugo Frigerio	Italy
2nd place, silver medalist(s)		George Parker	Australia
3rd place, bronze medalist(s)		Richard Remer	United States

Official Video

The men's 3 kilometres walk event was part of the track and field athletics programme at the 1920 Summer Olympics. The competition was held on the track on Friday, August 20, 1920, and on Saturday, August 21, 1920. Twenty-two race walkers from twelve nations competed.

== Records ==
These were the standing world and Olympic records (in minutes) prior to the 1920 Summer Olympics.

World record	Gunnar Rasmussen (DEN)	12:53.8 (Note: Note that the 2-mile walk world record at the time was 13:11.4 by G. E. Lamer of England, set on 13 June 1904. This is approximately 12:17.6 pace through 3000 metres.)	Denmark	7 July 1918
Olympic record	György Sztantics (HUN)	15:13.2	Athens (GRE)	1 May 1906

Every race saw a new Olympic record. At first Donato Pavesi bettered the record in the first semifinal with 13:46.8 minutes. In the second semifinal his fellow countryman Ugo Frigerio improved the record with 13:40.2 minutes. In the final Frigerio again set a new Olympic record with 13:14.2 minutes. As the competition has been discontinued, his Olympic record still stands.

== Results ==
=== Semifinals ===
The semifinals were held on Friday, August 20, 1920.

Semifinal 1

Place	Athlete	Time	Qual.
1	Donato Pavesi (ITA)	13:46.8 OR	Q
2	George Parker (AUS)	(13:47.9)	Q
3	Thomas Maroney (USA)	(13:52.1)	Q
4	Charles Dowson (GBR)	(13:54.9)	Q
5	Niels Pedersen (DEN)	(14:06.3)	Q
6	Jean Seghers (BEL)	(14:09.2)	Q
7	Paul Verlaeckt (BEL)		
—	Josef Šlehofer (TCH)	DQ	
—	Cor Gubbels (NED)	DQ	
—	Eduard Hermann (EST)	DQ	
—	Joseph Pearman (USA)	DQ	

Semifinal 2

Place	Athlete	Time	Qual.
1	Ugo Frigerio (ITA)	13:40.2 OR	Q
2	Cecil McMaster (RSA)	(13:48.5)	Q
3	Richard Remer (USA)	(13:54.1)	Q
4	Winfred Rolker (USA)	(13:59.8)	Q
5	William Hehir (GBR)		Q
5	Charles Gunn (GBR)		Q
7	August Schotte (NED)		
8	Edward Freeman (CAN)		
9	Charles Wiggers (BEL)		
—	Stanislas Anselmetti (SUI)	DQ	
—	Gunnar Rasmussen (DEN)	DQ	

=== Final ===
The final was held on Saturday, August 21, 1920.

Place	Athlete	Time
1	Ugo Frigerio (ITA)	13:14.2 OR
2	George Parker (AUS)	(13:19.6)
3	Richard Remer (USA)	(13:22.2)
4	Cecil McMaster (RSA)	(13:23.6)
5	Thomas Maroney (USA)	(13:25.0)
6	Charles Dowson (GBR)	(13:28.0)
7	William Hehir (GBR)	(13:29.8)
8	Winfred Rolker (USA)	(13:30.4)
9	Jean Seghers (BEL)	(13:31.3)
10	Charles Gunn (GBR)	(13:34.0)
11	Niels Pedersen (DEN)	(13:36.8)
—	Donato Pavesi (ITA)	DQ

== Sources ==
- Belgium Olympic Committee (1957). Olympic Games Antwerp 1920: Official Report (in French).
- Wudarski, Pawel (1999). "Wyniki Igrzysk Olimpijskich" (in Polish).
