= Australia at the 1906 Intercalated Games =

Australia at the Olympics

- IOC code: AUS
- NOC: Australasian Olympic Committee

in Athens
- Competitors: 4 in 2 sports
- Medals Ranked 15th: Gold 0 Silver 0 Bronze 3 Total 3

Summer appearances
- 1896; 1900; 1904; 1908; 1912; 1920; 1924; 1928; 1932; 1936; 1948; 1952; 1956; 1960; 1964; 1968; 1972; 1976; 1980; 1984; 1988; 1992; 1996; 2000; 2004; 2008; 2012; 2016; 2020; 2024

Winter appearances
- 1936; 1948; 1952; 1956; 1960; 1964; 1968; 1972; 1976; 1980; 1984; 1988; 1992; 1994; 1998; 2002; 2006; 2010; 2014; 2018; 2022; 2026

Other related appearances
- Australasia (1908–1912)

Australia competed at the 1906 Intercalated Games in Athens, Greece. Four athletes, all men, competed in nine events in two sports.

== Medalists ==
Medal	Name	Sport	Event
Bronze	Nigel Barker	Athletics	100 metres
Bronze	Nigel Barker	Athletics	400 metres
Bronze	Cecil Healy	Swimming	100 metres freestyle

== Athletics ==
Three athletes represented Australia in 1906 in athletics. Nigel Barker won both of Australia's medals in athletics at these Games.

Ranks given are within the heat.

Athlete	Event	Round 1	Semifinals	Final
Nigel Barker	100 metres	2	2	3rd place, bronze medalist(s)
Nigel Barker	400 metres	1	N/A	3rd place, bronze medalist(s)
George Blake	1500 metres	DNQ	N/A	Did not continue
George Blake	5 mile	N/A	N/A	6
George Blake	Marathon	N/A	N/A	6
Dad Wheatley	800 metres	3	N/A	Did not continue
Dad Wheatley	1500 metres	4	N/A	4

== Swimming ==
One swimmer, Cecil Healy, represented Australia in 1906.

Ranks given are within the heat.

Athlete	Event	Round 1	Semifinals	Final
Cecil Healy	100 metres freestyle	2	2	3rd place, bronze medalist(s)
Cecil Healy	400 metres freestyle	N/A	N/A	6
Cecil Healy	1 mile freestyle	N/A	N/A	DNF
