= London Marathon Ever Presents =

Group of people to run each London Marathon

Ever Presents
- Formation: c. April 20, 1996; 30 years ago
- Members: Runners of all London Marathons since 1981
- Affiliations: London Marathon
- Website: www.everpresent.org.uk

The Ever Presents are a group of people who have run the London Marathon at each event since the first event in 1981. In 1995 the group was first recognised with 42 members. A person is considered to no longer be an Ever Present if they do not run the race in a given year. After the 2026 race, there were five remaining members of the group.

The group's youngest member is Chris Finill who, from 1981 to 2013, completed every race in less than three hours, earning a Guinness World Record for this consistent high performance.

Beginning with the 2020 London Marathon, which was elite-only on the London track, virtual participation (running a tracked marathon on the same day elsewhere) has been sufficient to maintain Ever Present status.

== Members ==
=== Original members ===
The group was first acknowledged in 1995 after the 15th marathon with 42 members who had run each event.

Name	Club	Age in 1981	Time in 1981	Final race (Note: "Final race" denotes last complete race; some runners started the following year's race but failed to finish)
Christopher Adams	Orion Harriers	38	02:49:37	2002
Alastair Aitken	Highgate Harriers	41	02:53:01	1999
Jeff Aston	Les Croupiers	33	02:49:53	Ever Present
Geoffrey Balfour	Huncote Harriers	31	02:45:00	2000
Reginald Brown	SLH	49	03:07:38	2000
Reginald Burbidge	Highgate Harriers	55	03:54:17	2007
Rainer Burchett	Shaftesbury Barnet Harriers	41	02:58:30	2011
Harold Chadwick	Bournemouth /TH&H	34	02:24:10	1996
David Clark	Newbury AC	45	02:53:55	2010
Charles Cousens	Vale of Aylesbury	38	02:58:13	2020
Patrick Dobbs	Thurrock Harriers	42	02:41:37	2014
Erik Falck-Therkelsen	Woking AC	40	02:59:59	2001
David Fereday	Barnet & District	42	03:13:55	2014
Chris Finill	Harrow AC	22	02:32:55	Ever Present
Derek Fisher	Newport Harriers	45	02:56:22	2004
Jeffrey Gordon	Thames H&H	47	03:13:42	2013
Peter Greenwood	Canterbury Harriers AC	38	02:46:53	2002
John Hanscombe	Ranelagh Harriers	45	02:54:29	2008
Jan Hildreth	Thames H&H	48	03:25:37	2005
Raymond Johnson	Kimberley & Dist. Striders	48	03:11:00	2006
Kenneth Jones	Orion Harriers	47	03:18:37	2023
Max Jones	Birchfield Harriers	53	03:51:52	2002
John Legge	Orion Harriers	50	03:02:35	2000
Roger Low	Highgate Harriers	37	02:47:55	2020
Dale Lyons	Massey Ferguson RC	44	03:10:03	2018
Terence Macey	New Eltham Joggers	32	03:17:56	2020
Lionel Mann	Belgrave Harriers	40	03:06:07	2002
Don Martin	Royal Parks Police	40	04:10:00	2005
Roger Mawer	Lowestoft	40	02:58:04	2009
Mick McGeoch	Les Croupiers	25	02:24:19	2002
William O’Connor	Queen's Park Harriers	35	02:35:52	Ever Present
Michael Peace	Ranelagh Harriers	31	03:11:45	Ever Present
Mike Peel	Blackheath & Bromley Harriers AC	39	02:40:30	2012
Derrick Pickering	East Hull Harriers	44	02:38:38	2010
Bryan Read	Orion Harriers	40	03:24:05	1998
Peter Shepheard	Blackheath Harriers	38	02:29:47	2005
Malcolm Speake	Bildeston Bounders	39	02:47:58	2025
Michael Starr	St Albans Striders	37	03:47:11	2002
Tony Tillbrooke	Victory AC	41	03:42:24	2012
David Walker	Chalfont & Chiltern	35	03:06:11	Ever Present
Steve Wehrle	Dulwich Runners AC	32	03:51:26	2016
Michael Wilkinson	Duke Street Runners	42	02:52:51	2007

- — no longer a member
- — still a member

=== Current members ===
Five people have completed every London Marathon up to and including the 2026 event.

Name	Club	Age	Most recent time (2026)
Jeff Aston	Les Croupiers	78	08:45:26
Chris Finill	Harrow AC	67	03:15:16
William O'Connor	Queen's Park Harriers	80	08:39:55
Michael Peace	Ranelagh Harriers	76	04:51:37
David Walker	Chalfont & Chiltern	80	09:29:58
