= Queen's Park Harriers =

Athletics club

- Nickname(s): The Hoopsters, The Hoops, The Park
- Founded: 1887
- Colors: Red and White Hooped Vest (Danebury hoops)
- Home ground: Willesden Sports Centre, Willesden Green, London NW10 3QX, England

Personnel
- Members: Approx. 200 (June 2026)
- Website: official webiote
Home

Queen's Park Harriers are a track and cross country running club based in Willesden Green in London, United Kingdom with a current focus on long distance running competitions.

Having been founded in 1887 the club has been in continual existence for over 100 years. The club are one of nine London clubs that compete in the annual Summer League, an event that takes place across several London parks over the course of the summer months as well as several cross country championships in North London and Middlesex. It also organises the annual Liddiard Trophy Cross Country event.

== History ==
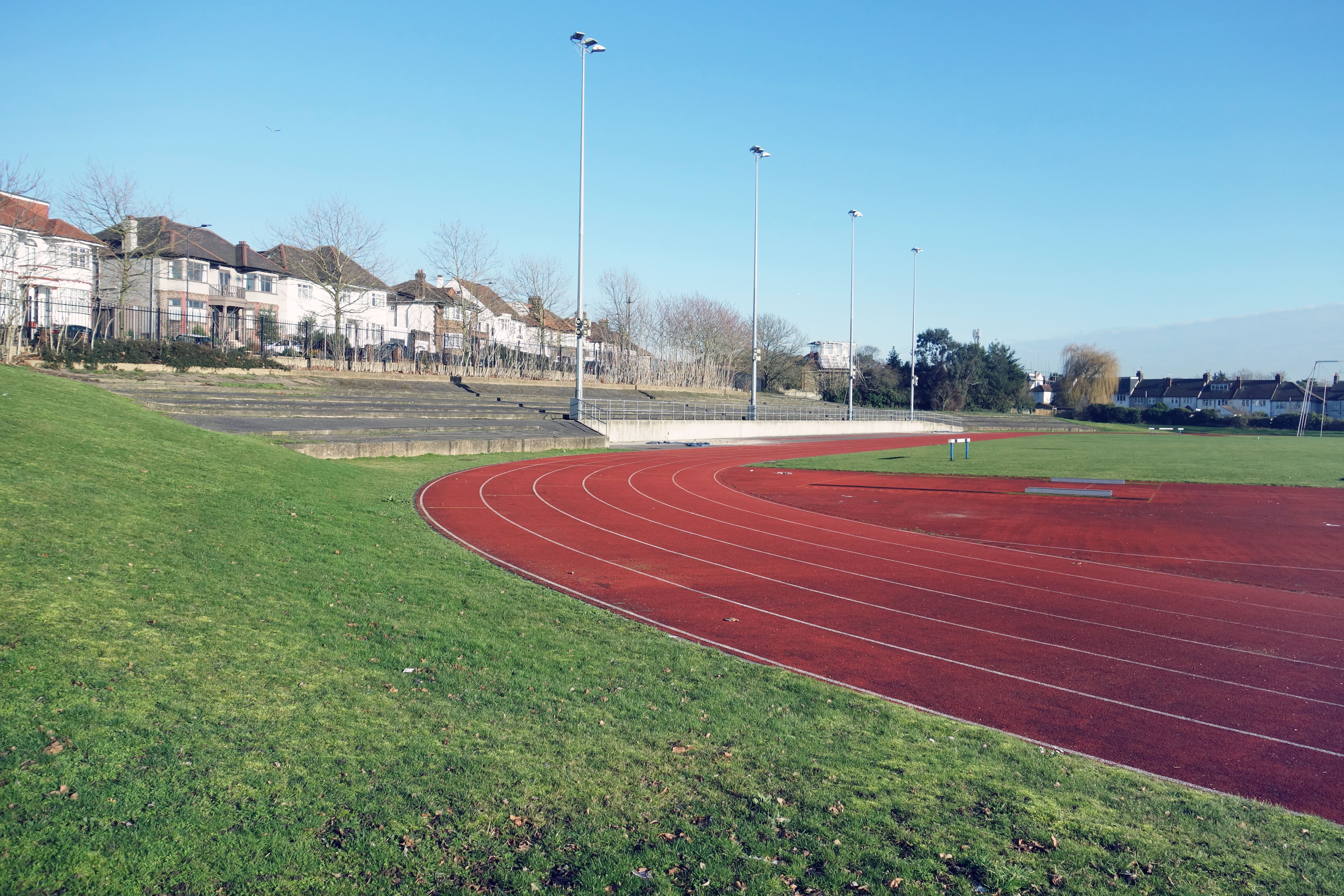
The athletics track at Willesden Sports Centre

The roots of Queen's Park Harriers can be traced back to a group of students from St. Judes Institute, Queen's Park who formed a sports club including both athletics and football in 1884. In 1886, the sports club merged with Christchurch Rangers to form Queens Park Rangers F.C., and in the following year "Queen's Park Harriers" was formed from those original members who wished to focus on athletics.

Founded in 1887, the Queen's Park Harriers commenced its activities from the St Jude's Institute, Queens Park. The club is the result of a division of the members of the Institute, one half forming themselves into the Harriers, whilst the remainder formed a football section which has since evolved into the now famous Queen's Park Rangers F.C.

The club run in red and white horizontally stripped vests, known as "The Danebury Hoops", named after the racing colours of jockey and horse trainer Tom Cannon Sr. In 1889, the club amalgamated with another local athletics club, West London Harriers, before merging with North London Harriers in 1897.

Amalgamation of the North London and Queen's Park Harriers

The above popular cross-country packs have amalgamated, and in future will be known as the Queen's Park Harriers. The colours will be changed for Tom Cannon's "Danebury Hoops" (red and white).

From formation, as well as being an athletics club, Q.P.H. would also organise social events for its members including "Smoking Concerts".

After the death of Mr E. J. Liddiard in 1946, the longest serving founding member of the club, the annual Liddiard Trophy Cross Country race was inaugurated on March 20, 1948 and continues to be run by club members at the local Fryent Country Park.

In 2021, the club was commended by England Athletics for their role in helping members of the local community stay active during the Covid pandemic lockdown stating:

Queen's Park Harriers, based in north west London, have been a shining example over the last 12-months of harnessing the sport's strong community spirit, particularly during this challenging time.

As of the 2024 event, long standing member William (Bill) O'Connor is one of only 6 remaining London Marathon 'Ever Presents', having run in all 44 events, starting with the 1981 event in a time of 02:35:52, at the age of 35.

== Leagues / Events ==
The club members compete in events throughout the year, focusing on road and track events in the spring and summer months, and cross country in the winter.

The events include, but are not limited to:

- Summer League
- Chiltern Cross Country League
- North London Cross Country Championships
- SEAA Masters Cross Country Championships
- Middlesex County Cross Country Championships
- Middlesex County Veterans Cross Country Championships
- Southern Counties Cross Country Championships

== Associated Clubs ==
Queen's Park Harriers also includes a club for junior athletes (ages 7 to 16).

The junior club competes in the following leagues:

- North West London Young Athletes Cross Country League
- Middlesex Young Athletes League

== Notable Athletes ==
=== Olympians ===
Athlete	Events	Games	Medals/Ref
Fred Carter	10 miles walk	1908	
Charles Dowson	3 km walk / 10 km walk	1920	
Eddie Toms	4 x 400m relay	1924	Bronze medal
Mike Lindsay	Shot Put / Discus	1960, 1964	
Alan Lerwill	Long Jump	1968, 1972	
Pete Tancred	Discus	1976	

=== Commonwealth Games ===
Athlete	Events	Games	Medals/Ref
Peter Browne	800m	1974	
