= Athletics at the 1920 Summer Olympics – Men's 10 kilometres walk =

Athletics at the Olympics

Men's 10 kilometres walk at the Games of the VII Olympiad
- Venue: Olympisch Stadion
- Dates: August 17–18, 1920
- Competitors: 23 from 13 nations

Medalists
1st place, gold medalist(s)		Ugo Frigerio	Italy
2nd place, silver medalist(s)		Joseph Pearman	United States
3rd place, bronze medalist(s)		Charles Gunn	Great Britain

The men's 10 kilometres walk event was part of the track and field athletics programme at the 1920 Summer Olympics. The competition was held on Tuesday, August 17, 1920, and on Wednesday, August 18, 1920. Twenty-three race walkers from 13 nations competed.

== Records ==
These were the standing world and Olympic records (in minutes) prior to the 1920 Summer Olympics.

World record	Gunnar Rasmussen (DEN)	45:26.4	Denmark	18 August 1918
Olympic record	George Goulding (CAN)	46:28.4	Stockholm (SWE)	11 August 1912

== Results ==
=== Semifinals ===
The semifinals were held on Tuesday, August 17, 1920.

Semifinal 1

This heat was one lap short, so the distance of this race was only 9600 metres.

Place	Athlete	Time	Qual.
1	Ugo Frigerio (ITA)	47:06.4	Q
2	Joseph Pearman (USA)	47:30.0	Q
3	George Parker (AUS)	47:31.0	Q
4	Donato Pavesi (ITA)	48:12.0	Q
5	Charles Gunn (GBR)	48:22.0	Q
6	Jean Seghers (BEL)	48:29.0	Q
7	Winfred Rolker (USA)		
—	Josef Šlehofer (TCH)	DNF	
—	Charles Dowson (GBR)	DNF	
—	Paul Verlaeckt (BEL)	DQ	
—	Eduard Hermann (EST)	DQ	
—	Martial Simon (FRA)	DQ	
—	Gunnar Rasmussen (DEN)	DQ	

Semifinal 2

Place	Athlete	Time	Qual.
1	William Hehir (GBR)	51:33.8	Q
2	Cecil McMaster (RSA)	51:39.0	Q
3	Thomas Maroney (USA)	(51:54.6)	Q
4	William Plant (USA)	(52:18.3)	Q
5	Luis Meléndez (ESP)	(53:56.6)	Q
6	Antoine Doyen (BEL)		Q
—	Stanislas Anselmetti (SUI)	DNF	
—	Charles Wiggers (BEL)	DQ	
—	Niels Pedersen (DEN)	DQ	
—	Eversleigh Freeman (CAN)	DQ	

=== Final ===
The final was held on Wednesday, August 18, 1920.

Before the race started Frigerio handed the conductor of the mid-field band several sheets of music, which he requested to be played during the race. He won so easily that he stopped once to show the band the correct tempo...

Place	Athlete	Time
1	Ugo Frigerio (ITA)	48:06.2
2	Joseph Pearman (USA)	(49:40.2)
3	Charles Gunn (GBR)	(49:43.9)
4	Cecil McMaster (RSA)	(50:04.0)
5	William Hehir (GBR)	(50:11.8)
6	Thomas Maroney (USA)	(50:24.4)
7	Jean Seghers (BEL)	(50:32.4)
8	Antoine Doyen (BEL)	(56:30.0)
—	Luis Meléndez (ESP)	DNF
—	George Parker (AUS)	DQ
—	Donato Pavesi (ITA)	DQ
—	William Plant (USA)	DNS

== Sources ==
- Belgium Olympic Committee (1957). Olympic Games Antwerp 1920: Official Report (in French).
- Wudarski, Pawel (1999). "Wyniki Igrzysk Olimpijskich" (in Polish).
