= Konrad Gerhardt Klemmer =

German herpetologist (1930–2023)

- Born: 25 November 1930; Frankfurt am Main, Germany
- Died: 28 March 2023 (aged 92); Bad Homburg vor der Höhe, Germany
- Education: Goethe University Frankfurt
- Known for: Research on Lacertidae; European reptiles
- Scientific career
- Fields: Herpetology
- Workplaces: Senckenberg Naturmuseum

Konrad Gerhardt Klemmer (25 November 1930 – 28 March 2023) was a German herpetologist whose research focused primarily on the family Lacertidae (true lizards). He spent most of his professional career at the Senckenberg Naturmuseum in Frankfurt am Main.

== Biography ==
Konrad Klemmer was born in Frankfurt am Main to Georg and Helene Klemmer (née Köhler). Shortly after the end of the Second World War, he began working as a volunteer assistant at the Senckenberg Museum, demonstrating an early commitment to natural history research. In 1946, he became a member of the Senckenberg Society for Nature Research.

In 1949, Klemmer began studying zoology, botany, chemistry, and paleontology at Goethe University Frankfurt. His academic mentors included Hermann Giersberg, Robert Mertens, Otto zur Strassen, Camill Montfort, Karl Egle and Rudolf Richter. In November 1957, under the supervision of Robert Mertens, he earned a doctorate with a dissertation on the osteology and taxonomy of European wall lizards.

Klemmer joined the herpetology department of the Senckenberg Museum as a research assistant in 1956, became a scientific assistant in 1957, and was appointed curator in April 1962, a position he held until his retirement in November 1995. His research concentrated primarily on lizards, but also included European amphibians and reptiles, venomous snakes, and convergent adaptations to tropical environments. He was the first herpetologist to investigate the molting mechanism of sea snakes.

During the 1960s, Klemmer conducted collecting expeditions to Morocco and Western Sahara. In 1964, he was a founding member of the German Society for Herpetology and Terrarium Science and its journal Salamandra, serving as the society's president from 1968 to 1982. He was also appointed director of the Senckenberg School in 1964, Germany's only vocational school training technical assistants for natural history museums and research institutions.

Following Germany’s accession to the Convention on International Trade in Endangered Species of Wild Fauna and Flora (CITES) in 1976, Klemmer became a founding member and later elected chair of the federal scientific advisory board on species protection, a role he held until 1992. In this capacity, he served as a member of the German delegation to CITES conferences from New Delhi (1981) to Kyoto (1992).

After Wolfgang Klausewitz retired in 1987, Klemmer assumed responsibility for public relations at the Senckenberg Society for Nature Research. Following his own retirement, his institutional roles were taken over by Gunther Köhler, Michael Türkay and Peter Königshof.

== Taxonomic work ==
Klemmer described two reptile species: in 1967, together with Robert Mertens and Ilya Darevsky, he described the Elburz viper Montivipera latifii, and in 1994, with Gunther Köhler, he described the iguanid lizard Ctenosaura flavidorsalis from Guatemala.

Three reptile species were later named in his honour: Argyrophis klemmeri, Lygodactylus klemmeri, and Phelsuma klemmeri.

== Selected literature ==
- Senckenberg-Nachrichten: Konrad Klemmer im Ruhestand, Natur und Museum, 126(5), 1996, pp. 33–34.
- Beolens, B.; Watkins, M.; Grayson, M. (2011). The Eponym Dictionary of Reptiles. Johns Hopkins University Press. p. 143. ISBN 978-1-4214-0135-5.
