= Jerry Lawson (runner) =

American long-distance runner

Personal information
- Born: July 2, 1966 (age 59) Jacksonville, Florida, United States

Sport
- Sport: Track and field

Jerry Lawson (born July 2, 1966) is a retired American long-distance runner who held a national record in the marathon. He won the 1992 Jacksonville Marathon in a course best time of 2:14.33 which thirty years later is still the male record. In 1993, Lawson bettered his marathon time by over three minutes, clocking a (still valid) course record time of 2:10:27 while winning the California International Marathon. After finishing in second place in the 1996 Chicago Marathon, Lawson set his P.R. of 2:09:35 in the 1997 Chicago Marathon behind winner Khalid Khannouchi.

In the mid-1980s, Lawson competed in cross country and track for Mohawk Valley Community College.

== Achievements ==
Year	Competition	Venue	Position	Notes
Representing the United States
1992	Macau Marathon	Macau, China	5th	Marathon
1992	Jacksonville Marathon	Jacksonville, Florida, United States	1st	Marathon
1993	California International Marathon	California State Capitol, United States	1st	Marathon
1996	Chicago Marathon	Chicago, United States	2nd	Marathon
