= Athletics at the 1912 Summer Olympics – Men's 10 kilometres walk =

Men's 10 kilometres walk at the Games of the V Olympiad
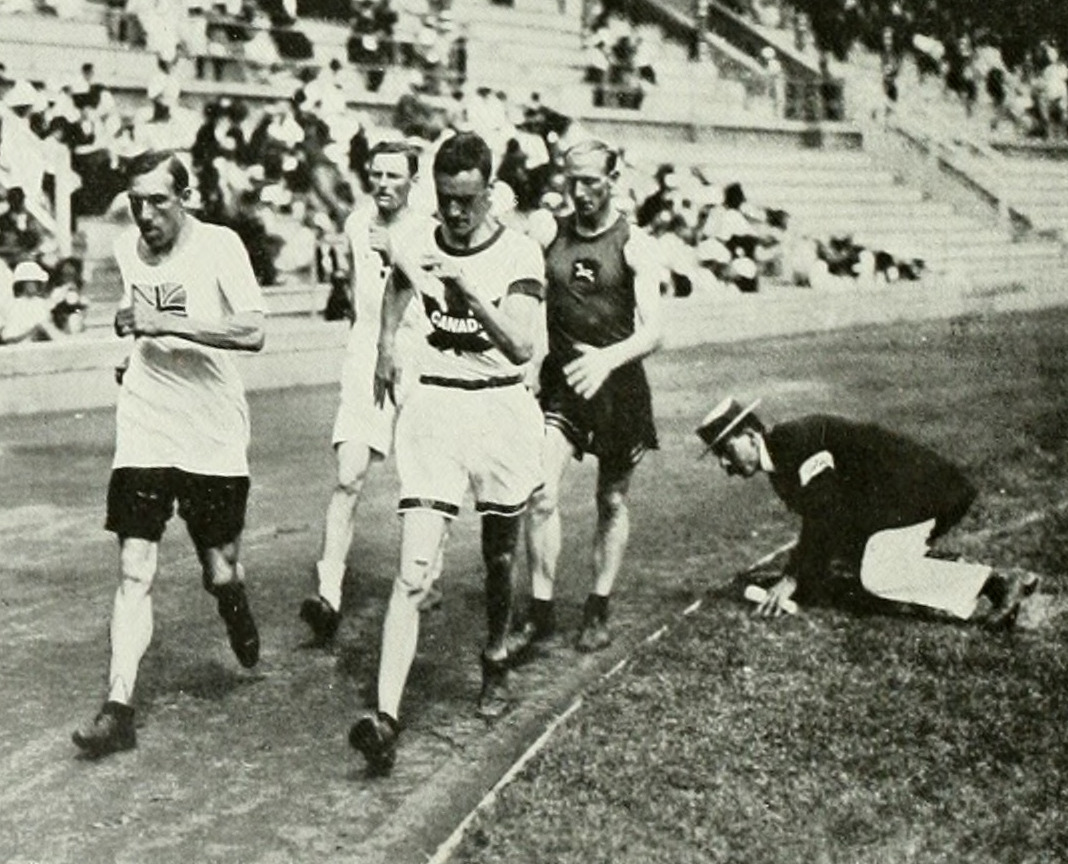
- The final with George Goulding in the middle.
- Venue: Stockholm Olympic Stadium
- Dates: July 8, 1912 (semifinals); July 11, 1912 (final)
- Competitors: 23 from 12 nations

Medalists
1st place, gold medalist(s)		George Goulding	Canada
2nd place, silver medalist(s)		Ernest Webb	Great Britain
3rd place, bronze medalist(s)		Fernando Altimani	Italy

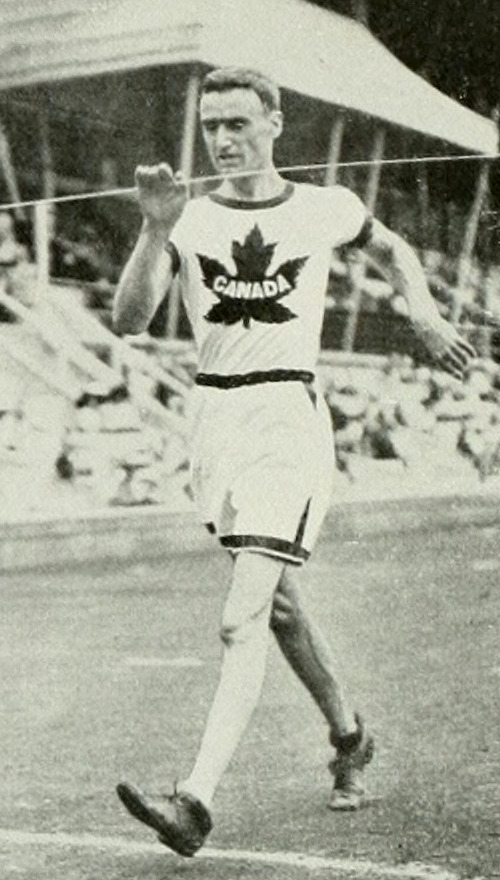
The winner George Goulding.

The men's 10 kilometres walk was a track and field athletics event held as part of the Athletics at the 1912 Summer Olympics programme. It was the second appearance of racewalking, which had debuted at the previous games with the 10 mile and 3500 metre walks. The 10 kilometre was the only racewalking event in 1912. The competition was held on Monday, July 8, 1912, and on Thursday, July 11, 1912. Twenty-three racewalkers from twelve nations competed. NOCs could enter up to 12 athletes.

== Records ==
These were the standing world and Olympic records (in hours) prior to the 1912 Summer Olympics.

World record	E. E. Merrill (USA)	45:28 (6 miles); 54:07 (7 miles)	Boston	5 October 1880
Olympic record	N/A			

== Results ==
=== Semifinals ===
Both semi-finals were held on Monday, July 8, 1912.

==== Semifinal 1 ====
Place	Athlete	Time	Qual.
1	George Goulding (CAN)	47:14.5	QF
2	Ernest Webb (GBR)	47:25.4	QF
3	Aage Rasmussen (DEN)	48:15.8	QF
4	Fernando Altimani (ITA)	48:54.2	QF
5	William Palmer (GBR)	51:21.0	QF
6	Samuel Schwartz (USA)	53:30.8	
7	Edward Renz (USA)	53:30.8	
—	Kaarel Lukk (RU1)	Did not finish	
—	Rudolf Richter (BOH)	Did not finish	
—	Eduard Hermann (RU1)	Disqualified	

==== Semifinal 2 ====
Place	Athlete	Time	Qual.
1	William Yates (GBR)	49:43.6	QF
2	Arthur St. Norman (RSA)	50:17.9	QF
3	Thomas Dumbill (GBR)	50:57.6	QF
4	Vilhelm Gylche (DEN)	51:13.8	QF
5	Frederick Kaiser (USA)	51:31.8	QF
6	Alfred Voellmeke (USA)	52:29.0	
7	Rolando Salinas (CHI)	55:02.0	
8	Henrik Ripszám (HUN)	55:20.6	
9	Aleksis Aide (RU1)	59:24.4	
—	István Drubina (HUN)	Did not finish	
—	Robert Bridge (GBR)	Disqualified	
—	William Murray (ANZ)	Disqualified	
—	Niels Pedersen (DEN)	Disqualified	

=== Final ===
The final was held on Thursday, July 11, 1912.

Place	Athlete	Time
1	George Goulding (CAN)	46:28.4
2	Ernest Webb (GBR)	46:50.4
3	Fernando Altimani (ITA)	47:37.6
4	Aage Rasmussen (DEN)	48:00.0
—	Vilhelm Gylche (DEN)	Did not finish
—	Frederick Kaiser (USA)	Did not finish
—	William Palmer (GBR)	Did not finish
—	Thomas Dumbill (GBR)	Disqualified
—	Arthur St. Norman (RSA)	Disqualified
—	William Yates (GBR)	Disqualified

== Sources ==
- Bergvall, Erik, ed. (1913). The Official Report of the Olympic Games of Stockholm 1912. Translated by Adams-Ray, Edward. Stockholm: Wahlström & Widstrand.
- Wudarski, Pawel (1999). "Wyniki Igrzysk Olimpijskich" (in Polish).
