= Arthur Norman =

Arthur Norman may refer to:

- Arthur Norman (industrialist) (1917–2011), British industrialist
- Arthur Charles Alfred Norman (1858–1944), British architect
- Arthur Norman (computer scientist), British computer scientist
- Arthur St. Norman (1878–1956), South African long-distance runner
