= William Hehir =

British racewalker

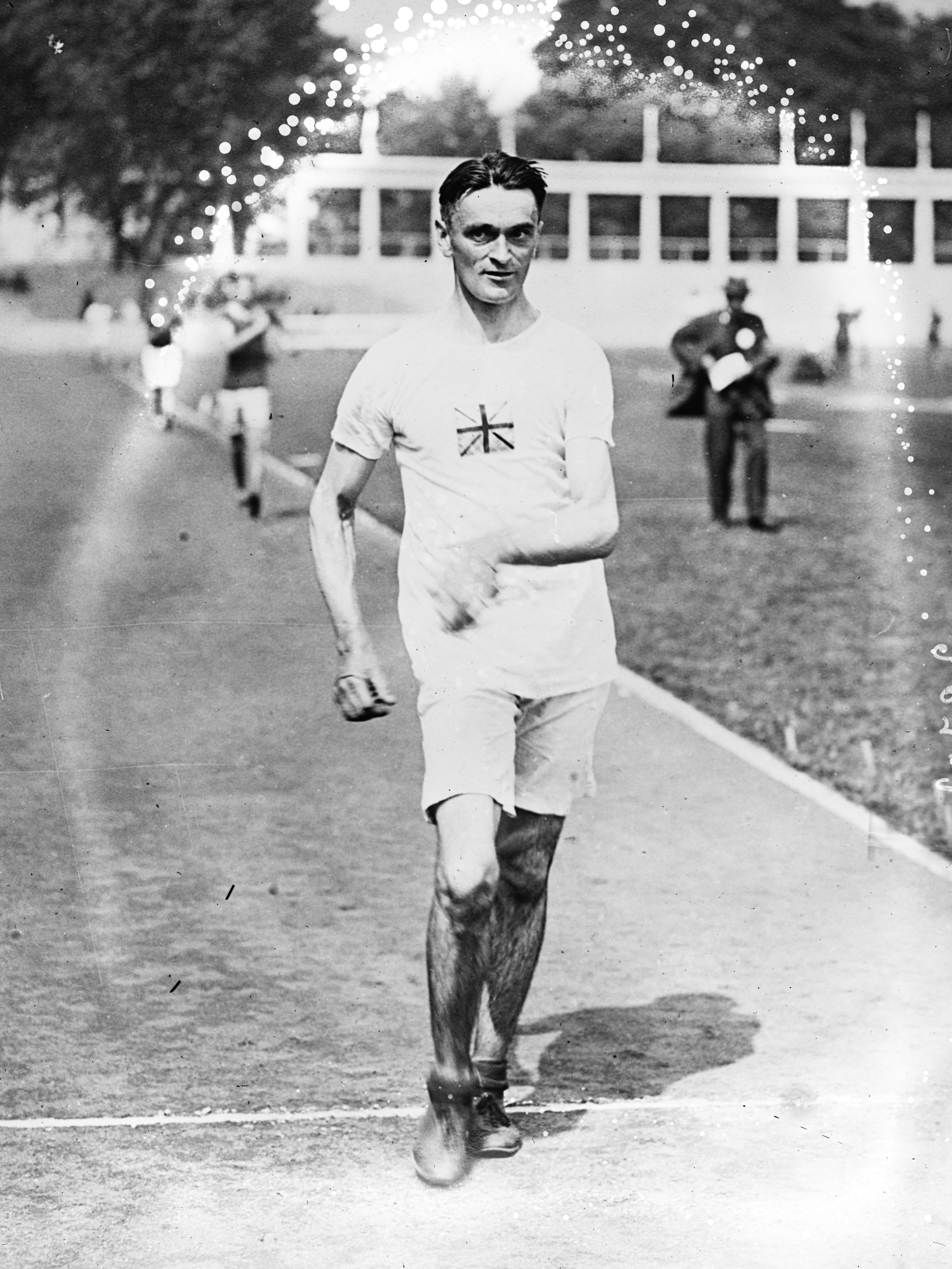

Personal information
- Born: 18 January 1887 Lisdoonvarna, Clare, Ireland
- Died: 15 October 1972 (aged 85) London, England

Sport
- Sport: Athletics
- Event: walk events
- Club: Herne Hill Harriers; Surrey Walking Club

William Hehir (18 January 1887 – 15 October 1972) was a British track and field athlete who competed in the 1920 Summer Olympics in racewalking events.

== Career ==
Hehir was born in Lisdoonvarna in County Clare, Ireland, but was associated with the Surrey Walking Club.

Hehir finished second and third respectively behind Robert Bridge in the 2 miles walk and 7 miles walk events at the 1914 AAA Championships.

After the war, Hehir finally became the National 7 miles walk champion after winning the title at the 1919 AAA Championships. In 1920 Hehir finished second behind Charles Dowson in both the 2 and 7 miles walk events at the 1920 AAA Championships. One month later, he competed at the 1920 Olympic Games in Antwerp, Belgium, where he finished fifth in the 10 kilometre walk competition and seventh in the 3 kilometre walk competition. The following year, he finished second behind Harold Ross in the 7 miles walk event at the 1921 AAA Championships.

Hehir was a carpenter and joiner by trade and lived in Dulwich. He died in London in 1972.
