= Eduard Hermann (race walker) =

Estonian race walker (1887–1960)

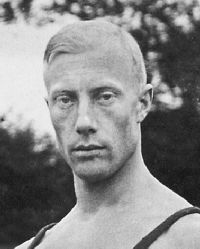
- Hermann in the 1910s

Personal information
- Born: 10 July 1887 Sootaga Municipality, Kreis Dorpat, Russian Empire
- Died: 8 February 1960 (aged 72) Chatswood, New South Wales, Australia

Sport
- Sport: Athletics, boxing
- Event(s): Race walking, middleweight
- Club: Aberg Tartu; Sport Tallinn

Achievements and titles
- Personal best(s): 3 kmW – 14:49.8 (1920); 10 kmW – 53:43.0 (1913)

Eduard Hermann (10 July 1887 – 8 February 1960) was an Estonian race walker and boxer. He started his career after placing first in a test event held in Riga, where he was selected to compete for the Russian Empire at the 1912 Summer Olympics. There he competed in the men's 10 kilometres walk, though he dropped out in the race. After the 1912 Summer Games, he set an Estonian national record in the event. Outside of sport, he fought for Russia during World War I and was captured as a prisoner of war in the German Empire.

He was released and competed for Estonia at the 1920 Summer Olympics in the men's 10 kilometres walk and men's 3000 metres walk, though he was eventually disqualified in both events due to a loss of contact with the road. In the same year, he became the national champion and held another national record.

After his race walking career, he became a middleweight boxer and was the first Estonian to write about boxing history and its rules. He later immigrated to Australia in 1926 for an agricultural job and later worked as a farmer until his death in 1960.

== Biography ==
Eduard Hermann was born on 10 July 1887 in Sootaga Municipality, Kreis Dorpat, Russian Empire. He began race walking in 1911 while being coached by Hendrik Tõnisson. Hermann qualified for the 1912 Summer Olympics in Stockholm, Sweden, after placing first in a 10,000 metres test event in Riga.

He competed for the Russian Empire at the 1912 Summer Olympics in the men's 10 kilometres walk. In the semifinals on 8 July, he was unranked after he had dropped out in the race. The following year he set a national record in the 10 kilometres walk with a time of 53:43.0. In November 1914 during World War I, he had to fight for Russia and was eventually captured as a prisoner of war in the German Empire.

After the war, he was released and eventually competed for Estonia at the 1920 Summer Olympics in Antwerp, Belgium. He competed in the semifinals of the men's 10 kilometres walk on 17 August and men's 3000 metres walk on 20 August. He was disqualified in both events due to a loss of contact with the road. In the same year, he won the 3 kilometres walk in the first Estonian Racewalking Championships. He also set another national record, doing so in the 3 kilometres walk with a time of 14:49.8.

Hermann was the first Estonian to write about boxing history and its rules, subsequently transitioning to the sport in the same year, competing in the middleweight category. The following year, he joined a boxing club and competed against the Helsinki Boxing Club.

He later immigrated to Australia, leading an agricultural and forestry team of Estonian migrants in the nation. He then worked as a farmer until his death on 8 February 1960 in Chatswood, New South Wales, Australia.
