= Liddiard trophy =

Cross-country competition

The Liddiard Cup is a London cross country competition first run in 1947. The event is named after E.J. Liddiard, a founding member of the host club, the Queens Park Harriers.

The event is annually staged in Fryent Country Park, Kingsbury.

In recent years the Liddiard Cup has been run in conjunction with the North of the Thames competition.

== Famous winners ==
Some famous winners include Mike Barratt, Andy Ferguson, Eric Shirley, John Merriman, Tony Simmons, Dave Bedford, Julian Goater and John Downes.

Mike Barratt has won the event more times than anyone else. The Ealing, Southall & Middlesex runner won it nine times between 1952 and 1965.

== Past winners ==
| Year | Men | Women |
|---|---|---|
| 2019 | M Callegari | E Dudgeon |
| 2018 | J Shelley | A Hollingsworth |
| 2017 | M Mohamed | M Renfer |
| 2016 | R Goodman | N Taschimowitz |
| 2015 | R Goodman | A Gounelas |
| 2014 | A Silva | E Mack |
| 2013 | A Silva | A Scott |
| 2012 | H Dodwell | M Urner |
| 2011 | M Aadan | L Da Silva |
| 2010 | C Smith | D Niccol |
| 2009 | H Lobb | B Penty |
