= Cor Gubbels =

Dutch racewalker

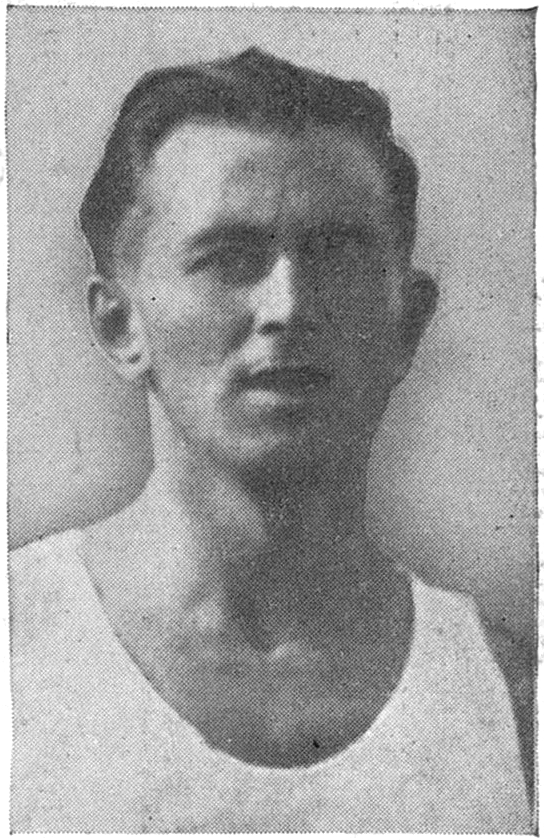
- Portret van Cor Gubbels, c. 1930

Personal information
- Full name: Cornelis Alexander Gubbels
- Nationality: Dutch
- Born: 21 September 1898 Bleiswijk, Netherlands
- Died: 24 January 1975 (aged 76) Rotterdam, Netherlands

Sport
- Sport: Athletics
- Event: Racewalking

Cornelis Alexander Gubbels (21 September 1898 – 24 January 1975) was a Dutch racewalker. He competed in the men's 3000 metres walk at the 1920 Summer Olympics.
