= William Murray (Australian athlete) =

Australian competitive walker

Personal information
- Born: 17 April 1882 Richmond, Victoria, Australia
- Died: 12 November 1977 (aged 95) Brisbane, Queensland, Australia

Sport
- Sport: Walking, long-distance running
- Club: Melbourne Harriers

William Murray (17 April 1882 – 12 November 1977) was an Australian athlete who competed in the 1912 Summer Olympics in Stockholm, Sweden.

Murray joined the Melbourne Harriers as a young man and started in long-distance running events; he is credited for winning the first-ever marathon run in Melbourne in 1910. He took up racewalking when asked to enter a race due to a poor field, which he went on to win. Over the next two weeks, he won two more events and even beat the current Australian record holder. In 1911 he broke the Australasian record for the one mile which had stood for 15 years and also became Victorian champion at the three-mile event, he won both events the next year also both in faster times, the NSWAAA (New South Wales Amateur Athletic Association) acknowledged his world record in the 3500 metre event of 14:49.4.

Later, in 1912, he travelled to Stockholm, Sweden to compete in the 1912 Summer Olympics, he was entered into the 10 km walk event, but due to some overzealous judging Murray was one of three athletes in his heat to be disqualified.

After the Olympics, he carried on winning in Australia, including the three-mile Victorian Championship three more times. He carried on walking for most of his life. In 1922, he was one of the foundation members of the Victorian Amateur Walkers Club; in 1930, he became president of the Melbourne Harriers; and in 1971, when he was 90 years old, he was Australia's oldest practising solicitor and still walked to work four times a week.
