= Alfred Voellmeke =

American racewalker

Personal information
- Nationality: USA
- Born: December 19, 1874 New York City, United States
- Died: May 10, 1951 (aged 76) Wolfeboro, United States
- Height: 6 ft 0 in (183 cm)
- Weight: 68 kg (150 lb)

Sport
- Sport: Athletics
- Event: Racewalking
- Club: Pastime Athletics Club

Achievements and titles
- Personal best: 10 km walk: 52:30 (1912)

Alfred Voellmeke (December 19, 1874 – May 10, 1951) was an American racewalker. He competed in the 10 km walk at the 1912 Summer Olympics.
