= Stanislas Anselmetti =

Swiss racewalker

Personal information
- Nationality: SUI
- Born: 4 May 1892
- Died: 18 August 1952 (aged 60) Geneva, Switzerland

Sport
- Sport: Athletics
- Event: Racewalking

Achievements and titles
- Personal best: 3 km walk: 14:03.2 (1918)

Stanislas Anselmetti (1892 – 18 August 1952) was a Swiss racewalker. He competed in the 3 km walk and the 10 km walk events at the 1920 Summer Olympics.
