= Donato Pavesi =

Italian racewalker (1888–1946)

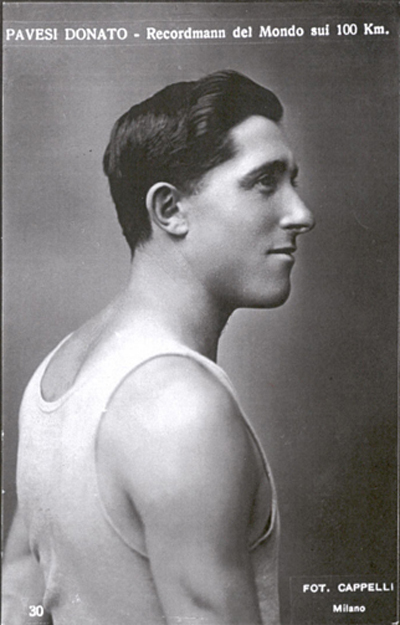
- Donato Pavesi after setting the world record

Personal information
- Nationality: Italian
- Born: August 19, 1888 Milan, Italy
- Died: 30 June 1946 (aged 57)
- Height: 1.76 m (5 ft 9 1/2 in)

Sport
- Country: Italy
- Sport: Athletics
- Event: Race walk
- Club: OM Milano

Achievements and titles
- Personal best: 10 km walk : 47.47.0 (1910) - 100 km walk : 9.51.39 (1922) 20 km walk : 1.37.42.2 (1927)

Donato Pavesi (August 19, 1888 – June 30, 1946) was an Italian track and field athlete who competed in racewalking in the 1920 Summer Olympics and in the 1924 Summer Olympics.

== Biography ==
Born in Milan (Italy) on the 19 August 1888, he was an extraordinary walker, especially on long distances. He won six times the famous yearly 100 kilometres racewalk between 1908 and 1939, also establishing the world record in the 1922 edition, with a time of 9.51’39’’ . He won other classic racewalks, such as the London-Brighton (8h 26' 23 in the 1921 edition and 8h 37' 27 in the 1923 edition), the Manchester-Liverpool, the Manchester-Blackpool or the 20 Miles of London at Stamford Bridge -

In 1920, he took part to the Summer Olympic Games in Antwerp and was disqualified in the 3 km racewalk final as well as in the 10 km final. Four years later he finished fourth in the 10 km competition at the Paris Games.

In 1927, he established the world record of Men's 20 kilometres walk with a time of 1.37’42’’2. He died in 1946 during a veteran racewalk.

== Achievements ==
Year	Competition	Country	Position	Event	Performance	Note
1921	London-Brighton	Great Britain	1 st	London-Brighton walk	8.26.23	
1922	100 km walk	Italy	1st	100 km walk	9.51.39	WR
1923	London-Brighton	GB	1 st	London-Brighton walk	8.37.27	
1924	Olympic Games	(France) Paris	4th	10 km walk	49:17.0	
1927	Arena-Milan	Italy	1 st	20 km walk	1.37.42.2	WR

== See also ==
- Italy at the 1920 Summer Olympics
- Italy at the 1924 Summer Olympics
