= 1997 Chicago Marathon =

Footrace held in Chicago, Illinois

20th Chicago Marathon
- Venue: Chicago, United States
- Dates: October 19

Champions
- Men: Khalid Khannouchi (2:07:10)
- Women: Marian Sutton (2:29:03)

The 1997 Chicago Marathon was the 20th running of the annual marathon race in Chicago, United States and was held on October 19. The elite men's race was won by Morocco's Khalid Khannouchi in a time of 2:07:10 hours and the women's race was won by Great Britain's Marian Sutton in 2:29:03.

== Results ==
=== Men ===
Position	Athlete	Nationality	Time
1	Khalid Khannouchi	Morocco	2:07:10
2	Fred Kiprop	Kenya	2:08:19
3	Peter Ndirangu	Kenya	2:08:46
4	Philip Chirchir	Kenya	2:08:56
5	Patrick Muturi	Kenya	2:08:59
6	Paul Evans	United Kingdom	2:09:20
7	Jerry Lawson	United States	2:09:35
8	Silvio Guerra	Ecuador	2:09:49
9	Jon Brown	United Kingdom	2:10:13
10	Todd Williams	United States	2:11:17

=== Women ===
Position	Athlete	Nationality	Time
1	Marian Sutton	United Kingdom	2:29:03
2	Gitte Karlshøj	Denmark	2:31:31
3	Irina Bogacheva	Kyrgyzstan	2:32:45
4	Christine McNamara	United States	2:33:08
5	Yoshiko Yamamoto	Japan	2:33:55
6	Debbie Kilpatrick	United States	2:35:05
7	Elaine Van Blunk	United States	2:35:49
8	Stefanija Statkuvienė	Lithuania	2:36:52
9	Ann Schaefers-Coles	United States	2:38:25
10	Lornah Kiplagat	Kenya	2:39:13
