= Aage Rasmussen =

Danish racewalker and photographer

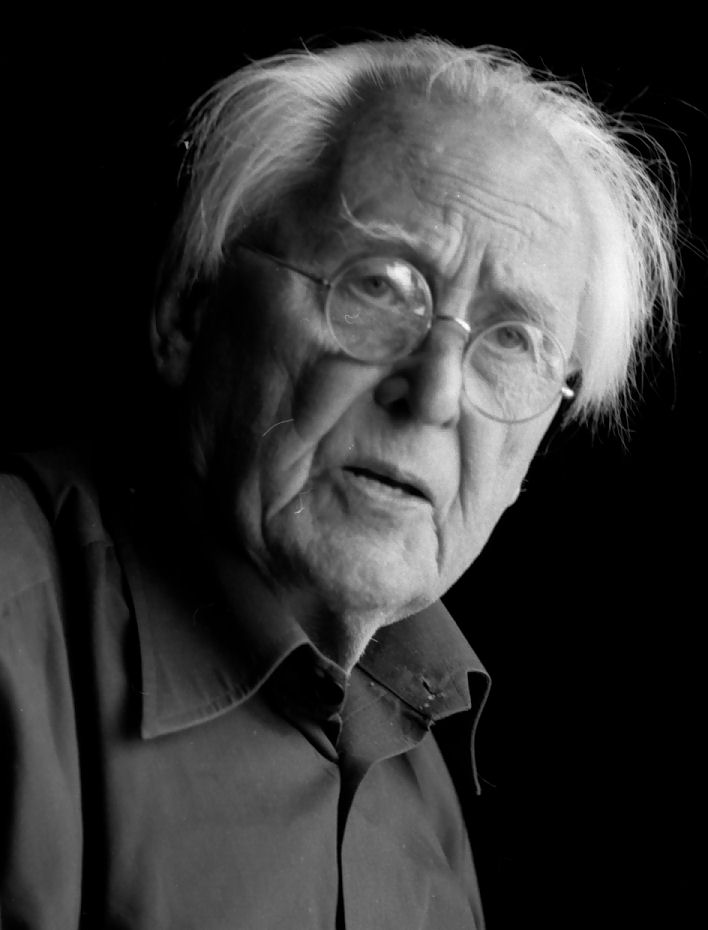

Aage Rasmussen (later Remfeldt; 4 September 1889 – 29 November 1983) was a Danish photographer and track and field athlete who competed in the 1912 Summer Olympics. He was born in Frederiksberg and died in Havdrup, Solrød municipality.

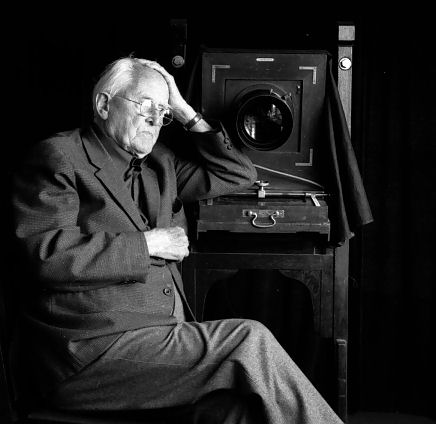
Remfeldt in 1979

In 1912 he finished fourth in the 10 kilometre walk event.
