= Charles Gunn (athlete) =

British racewalker

Personal information
- Born: 14 August 1885 St. Pancras, London, England
- Died: 30 December 1983 (aged 98) Chichester, England

Sport
- Sport: Athletics
- Event: walk events
- Club: Railway Clearing House AC
Medal record
Olympic Games
Men's athletics
Representing Great Britain
Bronze medal – third place	1920 Antwerp	10 km walk

Charles Edward James Gunn (14 August 1885 – 30 December 1983) was a British athlete who competed at the Olympic Games.

== Career ==
Gunn, born in St Pancras, London, finished third behind Charles Dowson in the 2 miles walk event at the 1920 AAA Championships.

One month later, at the 1920 Summer Olympics held in Antwerp, Belgium, Gunn competed for Great Britain in the 10 kilometre walk, where he won the bronze medal in the 10 kilometre walk. The following year he finished second behind John Evans in the 2miles walk event at the 1921 AAA Championships.

He died in Chichester.
