= Frederick Kaiser =

American racewalker

Frederick Henry Kaiser
Personal information
- Nationality: USA
- Born: October 31, 1889 New York City, United States
- Died: February 17, 1928 (aged 38) Chicago, United States
- Height: 5 ft 11 in (180 cm)
- Weight: 68 kg (150 lb)

Sport
- Sport: Racewalking
- Event: 10 kilometres walk
- Club: New York Athletic Club

Achievements and titles
- Personal best: 10 Km Walk: 51:31.8 (1912)

Frederick Henry Kaiser (October 31, 1889 – February 17, 1928) was an American track and field athlete. He competed in the 10 km walk at the 1912 Summer Olympics but he did not finish the race.
