= Luis Meléndez (athlete) =

Spanish racewalker

Personal information
- Nationality: Spanish
- Born: 28 May 1900 Barcelona, Spain
- Died: 3 March 1971 (aged 70) Barcelona, Spain

Sport
- Sport: Athletics
- Event: Racewalking

Luis Meléndez (28 May 1900 – 3 March 1971) was a Spanish racewalker. He competed in the men's 10 kilometres walk at the 1920 Summer Olympics.
