= Antoine Doyen =

Belgian racewalker

Personal information
- Full name: Antoine Joseph Doyen
- Nationality: Belgian
- Born: 26 December 1881 Saint-Gilles, Belgium
- Died: 3 January 1951 (aged 69)

Sport
- Sport: Athletics
- Event: Racewalking

Antoine Doyen (26 December 1881 – 3 January 1951) was a Belgian racewalker. He competed in the men's 10 kilometres walk at the 1920 Summer Olympics.
