= Herb Hunter (footballer) =

Australian rules footballer

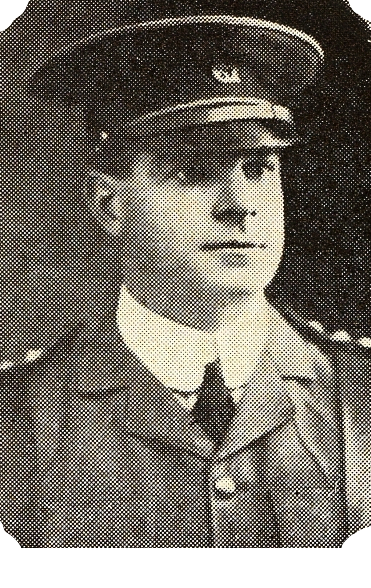

Personal information
- Full name: Herbert Humphreys Hunter
- Born: 18 November 1881; Sandhurst, Australia
- Died: 8 May 1915 (aged 33); Krithia, Ottoman Turkey
- Original team: Melbourne Grammar
- Position: Centre

Playing career^{1}
Years	Club	Games (Goals)
1900	Essendon	3 (0)
- ^{1} Playing statistics correct to the end of 1900.

Herbert Humphreys Hunter (18 November 1881 – 8 May 1915), LDS (Licentiate of Dental Surgery), DDS (Doctor of Dental Surgery), MACD (Member of the Australian College of Dentistry), a champion athlete, and an expert dental surgeon, was an Australian rules footballer who played with Essendon in the Victorian Football League (VFL).

He died in action at Gallipoli on 8 May 1915.

== Family ==
He was one of five sons and five daughters of George Frederick Hunter (1832–1907), an English civil engineer born at Ramsgate, who took over the established Kent Brewery, in McRae street, Bendigo, and Elizabeth Humphreys, whom he married on 11 September 1862. He was born in Bendigo (then known as Sandhurst), on 18 November 1881.

== Education ==
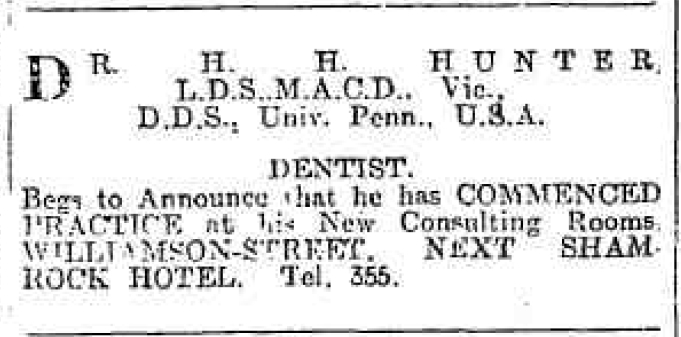
Hunter's February 1908 advertisement for his independent dental surgery practise in Bendigo.

Educated at Caulfield Grammar School and Melbourne Grammar School, he studied dentistry whilst resident at Trinity College at the University of Melbourne, where he gained the diploma for L.D.S. (Licentiate of Dental Surgery) in December 1904.

He went on to continue his studies at the University of Pennsylvania, where he gained a D.D.S. (Doctor of Dental Surgery) in 1906.

He became a member of the Australian College of Dentistry in 1906, and was registered to practise in the State of Victoria on 20 December 1907.

Whilst at the University of Pennsylvania he was admitted to the Delta Sigma Delta dental fraternity.

== Sportsman ==
A sportsman with multiple talents, he was awarded a double Blue in football and athletics whilst at the University of Melbourne.

=== Footballer ===
Whilst still at Melbourne Grammar, he played three senior matches for Essendon. He made his debut, playing at centre, against Collingwood on 23 May 1900. The match was postponed from the previous Saturday (19 May), and was rescheduled for Wednesday, 23 May; a public holiday celebrating the Relief of the Siege of Mafeking. The Age noted that "Hunter, centre, Groves and Hastings on the wing formed a splendid centre line [for Essendon]".

He played his second match, at centre, against Carlton on 26 May 1900, on a very wet ground which he did not handle well. and played his last match, again at centre, on 2 June 1900 against St Kilda.

He immediately resumed schoolboy football, and returned to playing with Melbourne Grammar's First XVIII.

=== Athlete ===
On 4 January 1901, at a special "Commonwealth Celebration" championship competition, held at the Sydney Cricket Ground as part of the celebrations held to mark the proclamation of the Federation of Australia on 1 January 1901, competing for the Victorian Amateur Athletic Association, Hunter registered some outstanding performances, including:

- First place: (Great Public Schools) Running Broad Jump Commonwealth Celebration Championship: 21 ft 11in (a world schoolboy's record)
- First place: (Great Public Schools) 100 Yards Commonwealth Celebration Championship: 11sec. (Nigel Barker of N.S.W. came second).
- First place: (Great Public Schools) 120 Yards Commonwealth Celebration Hurdles Championship: 17.6sec.
- Second Place: (Open Age) 100 Yards Commonwealth Celebration Championship (winner's time 10.6 sec).
- Second Place: (Open Age) Broad Jump Commonwealth Celebration Championship: 21 ft 4½in.

Two days earlier, at the 33rd gathering of the Highland Society of New South Wales, also representing the V.A.A.A., and also at the Sydney Cricket Ground, he had taken the significant Open Age amateur sprinter's handicap "double":

- First place (running off 5½ yards): "Hopetoun Sprint" 100 Yards Amateur Handicap (N.S.W.A.A.A.) Final: 9.8sec.
- First place (running off 11½ yards): "Federation Plate" 200 Yards Amateur Handicap (N.S.W.A.A.A.) Final: 22.2sec.

=== Bendigo Hare and Hounds Club ===
In 1903, he was captain of the Bendigo Hare and Hounds athletics club.

== Soldier ==
Herbert Humphreys Hunter

"This was the man – a champion athlete, an organiser,
a leader of men – he thought nothing of the pleasant life
of a professional man in his native city, but gave it all up.
He was appointed Captain in the [7]th Battalion, and in all
that went to make up the life of the camp he was a leader.
The sports meetings and boxing competitions saw him take
an active part, and in Egypt he organised a Stadium and
acted as referee in the boxing contests there.
"The story of his death is shortly told: On the morning of the
ever-memorable Landing on Gallipoli, in getting out of a boat
he sprained his ankle, but would not give in, and though his
foot was badly swollen he limped along at the head of his
men.
"Some days after (on May 8), in the assault of Krithia, he was
shot in the foot and was carried out of the firing line. Some
distance back, in what appeared to be a position of safety,
his bearers laid his stretcher down, and the dressers were
binding up his wound when a stray bullet, almost spent,
landed between them and shot Herbert Hunter through the
head, killing him. Thus died a brave, energetic, soldierly
man who earned and commanded the respect of all."

Prior to the Great War, Hunter had been a member of the 67th (Bendigo) Infantry Battalion, in the Citizens Military Forces. During his time with the Citizens Military Forces, he held the rank of Second Lieutenant (from 9 April 1908), Lieutenant (from 20 March 1911), and Captain (from 1 July 1913).

On 29 August 1914, he enlisted in the First A.I.F. His enlistment form was signed by Lieutenant Colonel Harold "Pompey" Elliott, who had raised the 7th Battalion in Bendigo, and had enlisted men from Western and Central Victoria. Elliot appointed Hunter a Captain in the 7th Battalion, First A.I.F., in charge of "G" Company; a company of men mainly enlisted from Bendigo and the wider Bendigo District.

He was part of the Landing on Gallipoli on 25 April 1915; and was killed in action during the assault of Krithia, less than two weeks later, on 8 May 1915: "In the 7th, advancing precisely as they had been trained to do … Captain Hunter – a famous Victorian athlete – was wounded and then hit again and killed" (Bean, 1923, p. 29).

== Remembered ==
Hunter has no known grave. He is commemorated amongst the 20,000 names at the Helles Memorial.

=== University of Pennsylvania ===
In 1920, the following entry appeared in a supplement to the University of Pennsylvania's October 1920, Alumni Register:

Herbert Humphreys Hunter ('07 D.), with the Australians, was killed in action at Cape Hilles [sic] May 8, 1915. He was wounded in the trenches near Walker's Ridge and while two stretcher lads were taking him down to the beach, where the hospital was, a Turkish shell killed him. He was Captain of D Company, 7th Battalion, 2nd Infantry Brigade, 1st Division, Australian Imperial Forces. 39.

== H. H. Hunter Memorial Shield ==
In July 1920, a beautifully designed shield, now generally known as "the Hunter Shield", carved in Australian blackwood by the prominent South Yarra artist, Mr Robert Prenzel, was presented to the Victorian Amateur Athletic Association (now known as Athletics Victoria) by Mr. M. P. (Marmion Percy) Adams, the author of The Rich Uncle from Fiji: and Some of his Relatives (1911), on behalf of a group of subscribers, to be a perpetual challenge trophy for the Association's annual track championship competition.

The shield's carving depicts Hunter beating the (later) Olympian athlete Nigel Barker by six inches in the 1901 national championship 100 yards race. Beneath the carving is a copper representation of an open book, upon which the names of the annual winners could be displayed.

Since 2001, when the Victorian Athletic League was discontinued, the Hunter Shield represented the best performing male club in Victoria; and, since 2009, the winner is based on female and male performances at the open Victorian Championships.

== H. H. Hunter Memorial Athlete of the Year ==
In 2008, Athletics Bendigo renamed its athlete of the year trophy "the H. H. Hunter Memorial Athlete of the Year" in Hunter's memory.

== See also ==
- List of Victorian Football League players who died on active service
- List of Caulfield Grammar School people

== Sources ==
External images
- Photograph of Captain Hunter and his men (Bendigo Railway Station, 5 September 1914). Source: NLA Trove
- Captains McKenna, Hunter, and Henderson in Egypt. Source: Museum Victoria
- Captain Hunter in Egypt. Source: Museum Victoria
- Captains Hunter, Weddell, and McKenna, Alexandria Wharf, leaving for Gallipoli (5 April 1915). Source: Museum Victoria
- Australians Killed in Action: Captain H. H. Hunter, The Argus, (Monday, 24 May 1915), p.7. Source: NLA Trove
- Those Who have Died for Freedom's Cause: Captain H. H. Hunter of Bendigo, Bendigo Advertiser, (Monday, 24 May 1915), p.5. Source: NLA Trove
- H. H. Hunter Shield. Source: Athletics Essendon

- Herb Hunter's playing statistics from AFL Tables
- Essendon Football Club profile
- Presentations to Bendigo Soldiers: Captain Hunter Honored, The Bendigonian, (Tuesday, 8 September 1914), p. 14.
- Careers of the Fallen: Captain Herbert Humphreys Hunter, The Age, (Monday, 24 May 1915), p. 11.
- Men of the Dardanelles: Captain H. H. Hunter, The Sydney Morning Herald, (Tuesday, 25 May 1915), p. 10.
- Anon, "Bendigo Officer Killed: Captain H. H. Hunter: A Brilliant Athlete", The Bendigonian, (Thursday, 27 May 1915), p.4.
- Freeman, G.H., "In Memoriam: Captain H. H. Hunter", The Bendigonian, (Thursday, 27 May 1915), p.4.
- Anon, "Late Captain Hunter: Football League's Tribute", Bendigo Advertiser, (Wednesday, 2 June 1915), p.7.
- Anon, "Caulfield Grammar School: Roll of Honour", The Argus, (Tuesday, 27 July 1915), p.8.
- National Archives of Australia: World War I Service Record: Captain Herbert Humphreys Hunter
- First World War Nominal Roll (26-066)
- First World War Embarkation Roll
- Australian War Memorial Roll of Honour: Herbert Humphreys Hunter
- Allen, H.W., "Hunter, Herbert Humphreys", p.lxv in Allen, H.W., Record of Active Service of Teachers, Graduates, Undergraduates, Officers and Servants in the European War, 1914–1918, H.J. Green, Government Printer, (Melbourne), 1926.
- Austin, R., "The Evolution of an AIF Battalion: the 7th Battalion at the Battles of Krithia (8 May 1915) and Lihons (10 August 1918)", Sabretache, Vol.46, No.1, (March 2005), pp. 11–18.
- Bean, C.E.W., The Story of Anzac: From 4 May 1915, to the evacuation of the Gallipoli Peninsula, Angus and Robertson, (Sydney), 1923.
- Holmesby, Russell & Main, Jim (2007). The Encyclopedia of AFL Footballers. 7th ed. Melbourne: Bas Publishing.
- Main, J. & Allen, D., "Hunter, Herbert", pp. 86–87 in Main, J. & Allen, D., Fallen – The Ultimate Heroes: Footballers Who Never Returned From War, Crown Content, (Melbourne), 2002.
- Maplestone, M., Flying Higher: History of the Essendon Football Club 1872–1996, Essendon Football Club, (Melbourne), 1996. ISBN 0-9591740-2-8
- Webber, Horace (1981). Years May Pass On... Caulfield Grammar School, 1881–1981. Centenary Committee, Caulfield Grammar School, (East St Kilda). ISBN 0-9594242-0-2.
- Wilkinson, Ian R. (1997). The Fields at Play – 115 years of sport at Caulfield Grammar School 1881–1996. Playright Publishing. ISBN 0-949853-60-7.
