= Rolando Salinas =

Chilean racewalker

Personal information
- Nationality: CHI
- Born: 1 November 1889 San Felipe, Chile
- Died: 20 April 1971 (aged 81)

Sport
- Sport: Athletics
- Event: Racewalking

Rolando Salinas (1 November 1889 – 20 April 1971) was a Chilean racewalker. He competed in the 10 km walk at the 1912 Summer Olympics.
