= Vilhelm Gylche =

Danish racewalker (1888–1952)

Vilhelm Emanuel Jakob Gylche (6 January 1888 – 18 December 1952) was a Danish track and field athlete who competed in the 1912 Summer Olympics. He is the brother of Karl Paul Kristian Gylche.

He was born in Copenhagen and died in Gentofte.

In 1912 he qualified for the final of the 10 kilometre walk event, but did not finish the race.
