= Winfred Rolker =

American racewalker

Personal information
- Nationality: USA
- Born: March 14, 1892 Brooklyn, United States
- Died: June 7, 1978 (aged 86) Palm Beach, United States
- Height: 5 ft 8 in (173 cm)
- Weight: 64 kg (141 lb)

Sport
- Sport: Athletics
- Event: Racewalking
- Club: New York Athletic Club

Achievements and titles
- Personal best: 3 km walk: 13:18 (1920)

Winfred Rolker (March 14, 1892 – June 7, 1978) was an American racewalker. He competed in the 3 km walk and the 10 km walk events at the 1920 Summer Olympics.
