= Martial Simon =

French racewalker

Personal information
- Nationality: French
- Born: 11 December 1898 Saint-Junien, France
- Died: 1 June 1977 (aged 78) Bry-sur-Marne, France
- Height: 160 cm (5 ft 3 in)

Sport
- Sport: Athletics
- Event: Racewalking

Martial Simon (11 December 1898 – 1 June 1977) was a French racewalker. He competed in the men's 10 kilometres walk at the 1920 Summer Olympics.
