= Aleksis Aide =

Latvian cyclist

Personal information
- Nationality: Latvian
- Born: 3 February 1888 Saint Petersburg, Russian Empire
- Died: 1913 (aged 24–25) St. Petersburg, Russian Empire

Sport
- Sport: Athletics
- Event(s): Cycling, Racewalking
- Club: 1 Riga Cyclists Union

Aleksis Aide (3 February 1888 – 1913) was an athlete from the Russian Empire. He competed in the 10 km walk at the 1912 Summer Olympics.
