= 1920 AAA Championships =

Outdoor track and field competition

- Dates: 2–3 July 1920
- Host city: London, England
- Venue: Stamford Bridge
- Level: Senior
- Type: Outdoor
- Events: 22

The 1920 AAA Championships was the 1920 edition of the annual outdoor track and field competition organised by the Amateur Athletic Association (AAA). It was held from 2–3 July 1920 at Stamford Bridge in London, England. The attendance was between 15,000 and 20,000 and the championships received a record entry of athletes.

The Championships consisted of 22 events and covered two days of competition. Two additional events in the form of the 56lb weight throw and tug of war were held during the 1920 championships.

== Results ==
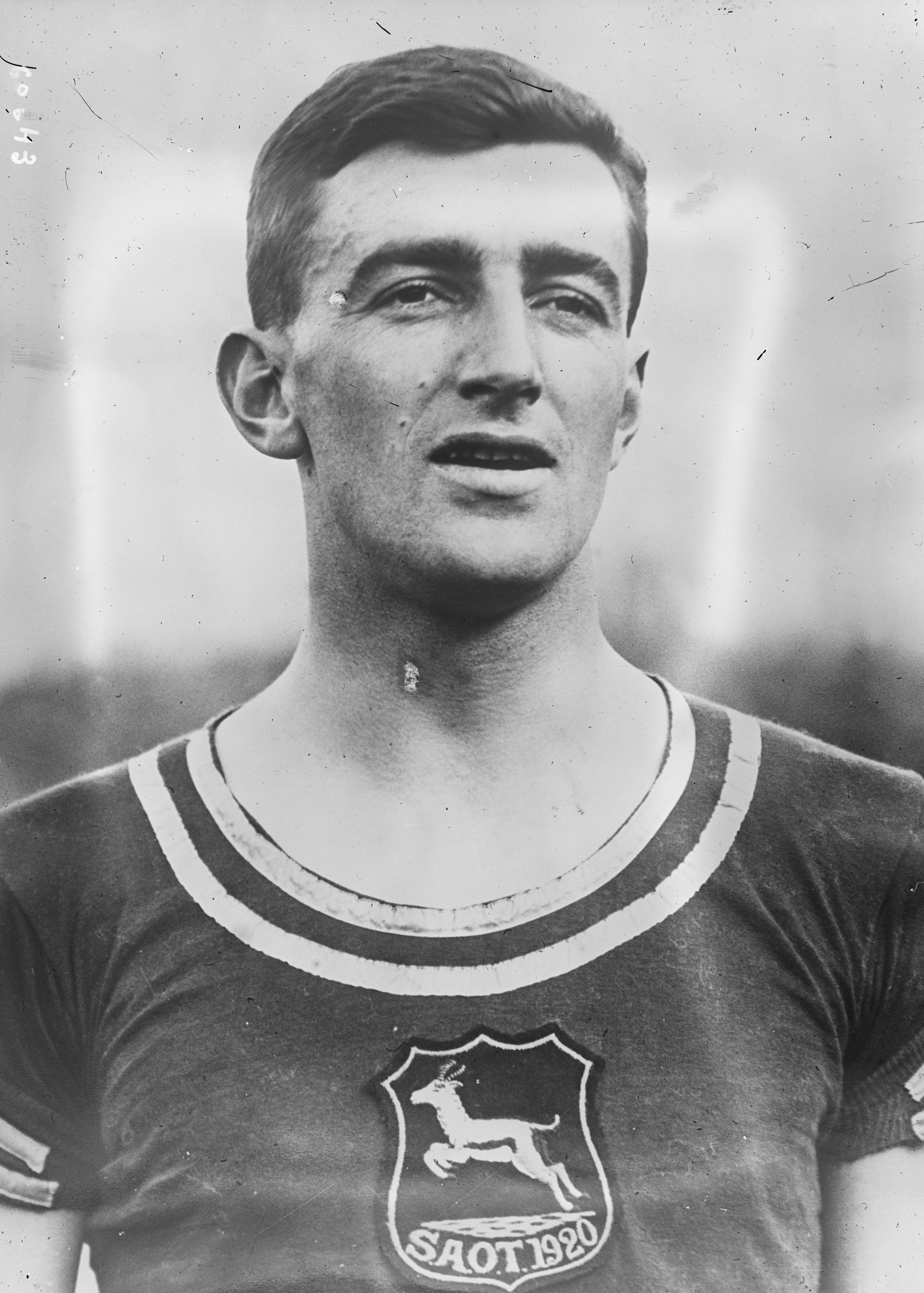
South African Bevil Rudd won the 440 and 880 yard events

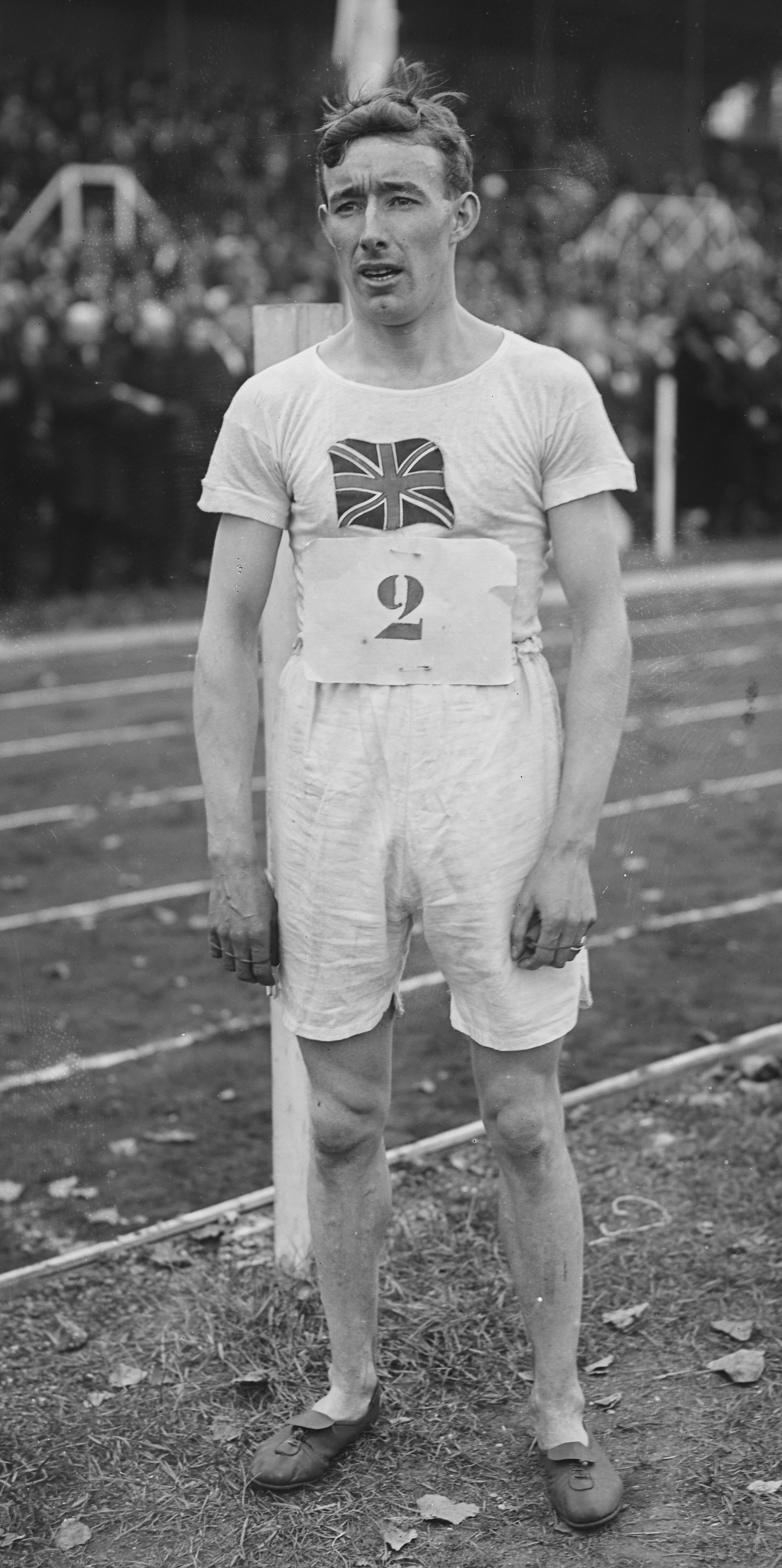
4 miles champion Joe Blewitt

Event	Gold		Silver		Bronze	
100 yards	Harry Edward	10.0	William Hill	½ yd	(South Africa) Jack Oosterlaak	1 ft
220 yards	Harry Edward	21.6	(United States) Ralph Brown	4 yd	William Hill	4-6 yd
440 yards	(South Africa) Bevil Rudd	49.2	Guy Butler	8½-10 yd	(Wales) Cecil Griffiths	12 yd
880 yards	(South Africa) Bevil Rudd	1:55.8	Albert Hill	1:56.6	Edgar Mountain	2-3 yd
1 mile	(France) Armand Burtin	4:23.0	(Scotland) Duncan McPhee	4:25.8	Wilfrid Tatham	12-20 yd
4 miles	Joe Blewitt	20:10.8	Evelyn Montague	20:14.4	(France) Gaston Heuet	25 yd
10 miles	Charles Clibbon	53:53.4	Bobby Mills	54:35.0	Walter Pratt	54:49.2
steeplechase	Percy Hodge	11:22.8	Charles Ruffell	11:32.0	Halland Britton	11:49.4
120y hurdles	(United States) George Trowbridge	15.4	George Gray	2 yd	(Australia) Eric Dunbar	7 yd
440y hurdles	Edward Wheller	57.4	(United States) W. A. Adams	4 yd	(Australia) Wilfrid Kent Hughes	
2 miles walk	Charles Dowson	14:32.0	William Hehir	14:43.0	Charles Gunn	14:49.0
7 miles walk	Charles Dowson	53:50.0	William Hehir	55:54.2	James Belchamber	57:36.4
high jump	Benjamin Howard Baker	1.911 NR	(Republic of Ireland) Tim Carroll (United States) Samuel Thomson	1.753	n/a	
pole jump	(France) André Francquenelle	3.20	Joe Birkett	2.79	only 2 competitors	
long jump	(United States) Donald Lourie	6.81	(France) Georges Courtin	6.40	(Republic of Ireland) G. Murphy	6.37
triple jump	Charles Lively	13.19	(Republic of Ireland) Tim Carroll	12.56	T. Welch	11.95
shot put	(France) Raoul Paoli	13.36	(United States) Samuel Thomson	13.27	(United States) Charles Halsey	13.00
discus throw	(Republic of Ireland) Patrick Quinn	37.62	(France) Raoul Paoli	37.40	(United States) Charles Halsey	31.76
hammer throw	(United States) Theodore Speers	42.81	(Scotland) Donald Rose	42.64	(Republic of Ireland) Denis Carey	40.42
javelin throw	(United States) Frank Murrey	45.64	(France) Arthur Picard	45.61	(United States) Samuel Thomson	41.16
56lb weight throw	(United States) Wesley Coe	7.21	(Republic of Ireland) James Barrett	6.67	(Republic of Ireland) Denis Carey	6.59
Tug of war	City of London Police AC	w/o	n/a		n/a	
1 mile Relay	Achilles AC; Philip Noel-Baker; C. F. Wood; William Milligan; Bevil Rudd	3.39 1-5sec	South London AC	80 yards	Crompton AC	
