= Thomas Dumbill =

British racewalker

Personal information
- Nationality: British (English)
- Born: 23 September 1884 Woolton, Merseyside, England
- Died: 9 November 1974 (aged 90) Hamilton, Ontario, Canada

Sport
- Sport: Athletics
- Event: Racewalking
- Club: Rusholme AC; Lancashire Walking Club

Thomas Henry Dumbill (23 September 1884 – 9 November 1974) was a British racewalker who competed at the 1912 Summer Olympics.

== Career ==
Dumbill finished third behind Bobby Bridge in the 2 miles walk event at the 1912 AAA Championships.

Shortly after the 1912 AAA Championships he competed in the 10 km walk at the 1912 Olympic Games.
