= Samuel Schwartz (race walker) =

American racewalker (1882–1943)

Personal information
- Born: July 1, 1882 New York City, United States
- Died: June 29, 1943 (aged 60) New York, United States
- Height: 5 ft 5 in (165 cm)
- Weight: 59 kg (130 lb)

Sport
- Sport: Athletics
- Event: Racewalking

Achievements and titles
- Personal best: 10 km walk: 53:30.8 (1912)

Samuel Schwartz (July 1, 1882 – June 29, 1943) was an American racewalker. He competed in the 10 km walk at the 1912 Summer Olympics.
