= August Schotte =

Dutch racewalker

Personal information
- Nationality: Dutch
- Born: 20 June 1883 The Hague, Netherlands
- Died: 4 March 1968 (aged 84) Brussels, Belgium

Sport
- Sport: Athletics
- Event: Racewalking

August Schotte (20 June 1883 – 4 March 1968) was a Dutch racewalker. He competed in the men's 3000 metres walk at the 1920 Summer Olympics.
