= Joseph Pearman =

American racewalker (1892–1961)

Personal information
- Born: May 8, 1892 Manhattan, New York, United States
- Died: May 30, 1961 (aged 69) East Orange, New Jersey, United States
- Height: 188 cm (6 ft 2 in)

Sport
- Sport: Men's athletics

Achievements and titles
- Personal bests: 47:30.0 (10kmW, 1920)
Medal record
Men's athletics
Representing the United States
Olympic Games
Silver medal – second place	1920 Antwerp	10 km walk

Joseph Bernard Pearman (May 8, 1892 – May 30, 1961) was an American race walker. He competed for the United States in the 1920 Summer Olympics held in Antwerp, Belgium, in the 3 kilometer walk and 10 kilometer walk, where he won silver in the latter. After retiring from racing, he became an athletics official and editor.

== Early life ==
Pearman was born in Manhattan, New York, on May 8, 1892. He claimed that his father paid the cost of moving to the United States by wagering on a horse race. He played American football with future author F. Scott Fitzgerald while attending the Newman School, where he played center. Afterwards, Pearman attended New York University.

Pearman served in the United States Army. He was a member of 71st New York Infantry Regiment and the 105th Infantry Regiment during World War I. Later in life, he was a commander for an American Legion post.

== Athletic career ==
Pearman's first race was at Ulmer Park, Brooklyn, in 1915. Afterwards, Pearman won multiple races, including first place in an Amateur Athletic Union race walking events in the one-mile, two-mile, three-mile, and seven-mile races. Pearman's fastest time for the mile was six minutes and thirty seconds. During his athletic career, Pearman was affiliated with the New York Athletic Club.

During the 1920 Summer Olympics, Pearman competed in the 10 kilometer walk and the 3 kilometer walk. For the three-kilometer race, Pearman failed to qualify for the finals. Despite this, Pearman qualified for the 10-kilometer race after taking second place. During the final, he led for the first ten laps and ran the first kilometer at 4:28. However, eventual winner Ugo Frigerio surged to take the lead. Pearman's final time was 94 seconds behind Frigerio's, taking second place. At the Olympics, Pearman shook the hand of Albert I of Belgium.

Pearman retired from competition in 1930. Afterwards, he participated as an athletics official, primarily for the Amateur Athletic Union. During the 1936 Summer Olympics, Pearman served as an official.

== Post-athletic career ==
=== Politics ===
Pearman unsuccessfully ran for the political office of Bergen County sheriff in 1945. He ran for office as a member of the New Jersey Democratic Party. His opponent in the election was Republican candidate Frank Livermore. He additionally served as a municipal chairman within the Democratic Party.

=== Writing ===
In addition to athletics, Pearman was an author and editor. He edited for the then-New York Edison Company, and for the Winged Foot, the publication for the New York Athletic Club. In addition to editing, he was a contributor to Bernarr Macfadden's publications and Encyclopædia Britannica's Book of the Year.

== Personal life ==
Pearman was involved in Catholicism; he served as the president of a Catholic Club, and hosted events for a Catholic church.

During his life, Pearman resided in Closter, New Jersey. He lived there for at least 30 years.

At the age of 69, Pearman died on May 30, 1961, at Veterans Administration Hospital in East Orange, New Jersey. At the time of his death, he was married.
