= Thomas Maroney =

American racewalker

Thomas Moroney
Personal information
- Born: August 12, 1895 New York City, New York, United States
- Died: January 1971 (aged 75) New York, United States
- Height: 5 ft 11 in (180 cm)
- Weight: 72 kg (159 lb)

Sport
- Sport: Athletics
- Event: Racewalking
- Club: St. Anselms Athletic Club

Achievements and titles
- Personal best: 3 km walk: 13:25 (1920) 10 km walk: 50:20.6 (1920)

Thomas Moroney (August 12, 1895 – January 1971) was an American racewalker. He competed in the 3 km walk and the 10 km walk events at the 1920 Summer Olympics.
