= István Drubina =

Slovak racewalker (1884–1965)

István Drubina (Slovak: Štefan Drubina; 17 August 1884 – 7 April 1965) was a Slovak track and field athlete who competed for Hungary in the 1908 Summer Olympics and in the 1912 Summer Olympics. He was born in Bratislava.

In 1908, he participated in the 3500 metre walk competition and was eliminated in the first round after finishing fifth in his heat. Four years later, he competed in the 10 kilometre walk event but did not finish his semi-final heat.
