= 2000 London Marathon =

20th London Marathon

20th London Marathon
- Venue: London, United Kingdom
- Date: 16 April 2000

Champions
- Men: António Pinto (2:06:36)
- Women: Tegla Loroupe (2:24:33)
- Wheelchair men: Kevin Papworth (1:41:50)
- Wheelchair women: Sarah Piercy (2:23:30)

The 2000 London Marathon was the 20th running of the annual marathon race in London, United Kingdom, which took place on Sunday, 16 April. The elite men's race was won by Portugal's António Pinto in a time of 2:06:36 hours and the women's race was won by Kenya's Tegla Loroupe in 2:24:33.

In the wheelchair races, Britain's Kevin Papworth (1:41:50) and Sarah Piercy (2:23:30) won the men's and women's divisions, respectively.

Around 93,000 people applied to enter the race, of which 42,596 had their applications accepted and 32,620 started the race. A total of 31,561 runners finished the race, comprising 24,613 men and 6948 women.

== Results ==
=== Men ===
Position	Athlete	Nationality	Time
1st place, gold medalist(s)	António Pinto	Portugal	2:06:36
2nd place, silver medalist(s)	Abdelkader El Mouaziz	Morocco	2:07:33
3rd place, bronze medalist(s)	Khalid Khannouchi	United States	2:08:36
4	William Kiplagat	Kenya	2:09:06
5	Hendrick Ramaala	South Africa	2:09:43
6	Stefano Baldini	Italy	2:09:45
7	Mathias Ntawulikura	Rwanda	2:09:55
8	Josia Thugwane	South Africa	2:10:29
9	Mukhamet Nazipov	Kazakhstan	2:10:35
10	Danilo Goffi	Italy	2:10:54
11	Mark Steinle	United Kingdom	2:11:18
12	Gert Thys	South Africa	2:11:32
13	Shem Kororia	Kenya	2:12:28
14	Patrick Ndayisenga	Burundi	2:13:28
15	Keith Cullen	United Kingdom	2:13:37
16	John Mutai	Kenya	2:14:55
17	Jamie Lewis	United Kingdom	2:15:07
18	Mark Hudspith	England	2:15:16
19	Sergio Jimenez	Mexico	2:15:37
20	William Burns	Switzerland	2:15:42
21	Alejandro Gomez	Spain	2:15:48
22	Mark Croasdale	United Kingdom	2:16:03
23	Joseph Maqala	South Africa	2:17:00
24	Rhodri Jones	United Kingdom	2:18:35
25	Ian Hudspith	United Kingdom	2:18:40
—	Daniel Lopes Ferreira	Brazil	DNF
—	Alcidio Costa	Portugal	DNF
—	Andrés Espinosa	Mexico	DNF
—	Germán Silva	Mexico	DNF
—	Peter Maher	Ireland	DNF
—	David Buzza	United Kingdom	DNF
—	Glynn Tromans	United Kingdom	DNF
—	David Tune	United Kingdom	DNF
—	Japhet Kosgei	Kenya	DNF
—	Isidro Rico	Mexico	DNF
—	Rui Vieira	Portugal	DNF

=== Women ===
Position	Athlete	Nationality	Time
1st place, gold medalist(s)	Tegla Loroupe	Kenya	2:24:33
2nd place, silver medalist(s)	Lidia Șimon	Romania	2:24:46
3rd place, bronze medalist(s)	Joyce Chepchumba	Kenya	2:24:57
4	Adriana Fernández	Mexico	2:25:42
5	Kerryn McCann	Australia	2:25:59
6	Derartu Tulu	Ethiopia	2:26:09
7	Maria Guida	Italy	2:26:12
8	Lyubov Morgunova	Russia	2:26:33
9	Manuela Machado	Portugal	2:26:41
10	Svetlana Zakharova	Russia	2:28:11
11	Zinaida Semenova	Russia	2:28:46
12	Ham Bong-sil	North Korea	2:29:08
13	Esther Kiplagat	Kenya	2:30:30
14	Ramilya Burangulova	Russia	2:31:14
15	Cleusa Maria Irineu	Brazil	2:35:11
16	Silvana Trampuz	Italy	2:36:32
17	Kim Chang-ok	North Korea	2:36:39
18	Patricia Jardon	Mexico	2:37:05
19	Teresa Duffy	Ireland	2:38:30
20	Lynne MacDougall	United Kingdom	2:38:32
21	Alison Wyeth	United Kingdom	2:39:02
22	Trudi Thomson	United Kingdom	2:40:40
23	Jo Lodge	United Kingdom	2:40:52
24	Angela Joiner	United Kingdom	2:44:07
25	Jo-Anne Newcombe	United Kingdom	2:46:16
—	Olga Markova	Russia	DNF
—	Nadezhda Wijenberg	Netherlands	DNF
—	Fernanda Ribeiro	Portugal	DNF

=== Wheelchair men ===
Position	Athlete	Nationality	Time
1st place, gold medalist(s)	Kevin Papworth	United Kingdom	1:41:50
2nd place, silver medalist(s)	Ernst van Dyk	South Africa	1:41:53
3rd place, bronze medalist(s)	David Holding	United Kingdom	1:47:11
4	David Weir	United Kingdom	1:47:11
5	Tushar Patel	United Kingdom	1:47:15
6	Bogdan Krol	Poland	1:47:16
7	Chris Madden	United Kingdom	1:52:01
8	John Hanks	United Kingdom	2:02:21
9	Richie Powell	United Kingdom	2:03:27
10	John Vink	Netherlands	2:04:39

=== Wheelchair women ===
Position	Athlete	Nationality	Time
1st place, gold medalist(s)	Sarah Piercy	United Kingdom	2:23:30
2nd place, silver medalist(s)	Tanni Grey-Thompson	United Kingdom	2:34:53
3rd place, bronze medalist(s)	?	?	
