= Edmund Law Rogers Jr. =

American actor (1850–1893)

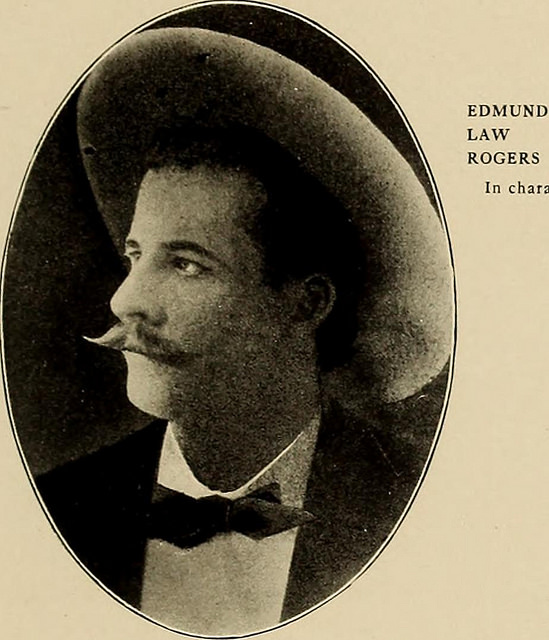
- Born: July 1, 1850; Baltimore, Maryland, U.S.
- Died: December 19, 1893 (aged 43); New York City, New York, U.S.
- Burial place: Baltimore, Maryland
- Other name: Leslie Edmunds
- Occupation: Stage actor
- Spouse: Anna Carleton
- Parent(s): Edmund Law Rogers; Charlotte Matilda Leeds Plater

Edmund Law Rogers, also known by the stage name Leslie Edmunds (July 1, 1850 – December 19, 1893), was an American stage actor. He was also a founding father of the Kappa Sigma fraternity at the University of Virginia.

== Early life ==
Rogers was born on July 1, 1850, in Baltimore, Maryland. His parents were Charlotte Matilda Leeds Plater and Edmund Law Rogers, a millionaire. He was a descendant and Calvert family of Mary and of Martha Washington (great-great-great-grandmother) and Elizabeth Parke Custis Law (great-grandmother). The family estate, Druid Hill, today is one of the largest city parks in North America.

Rogers attended the James Kinner Academy in Baltimore, where Frank Courtney Nicodemus was one of his classmates. In 1869, Rogers enrolled in the University of Virginia where he studied architecture and became interested in acting.

While at the university, Rogers, Nicodemus, and four other students started the Kappa Sigma fraternity. He also designed the fraternity's badge.

== Career ==
As early as 1875, Rogers began performing in plays, using the stage name of Leslie Edmunds. He initially performed in small parts for a low salary. In September 1875, he performed the role of Governor of Harfleur in Henry V at Ford's Grand Opera House in Baltimore. In April 1876, he played the timorous lover in Dollie Bidwell's touring production of Josephine: The Wife of Two. In August 1877, he joined the stock company of the Pittsburgh Opera House in Pittsburgh, Pennsylvania for the 1877–78 season.

He was cast in the role of St. Clair in a production of Uncle Tom's Cabin in Memphis, Tennessee in December 1878. He was cast in the role of George Peyton in The Octaroon production at the Broad Street Theatre in Philadelphia in December 1879. In November 1880, he was a member of Willie Edouin's Sparks Company, performing Dreams or Fun in a Photograph Gallary at Hooley's Theatre in Chicago; the Detroit Opera House in Detroit, Michigan; and Music Hall in Lynn, Massachusetts. Dreams also played at the Music Hall in Lynn, Massachusetts; the Academy of Music in Fall River, Massachusetts; and Roberts Opera House in Hartford, Connecticut; the Park Theatre in Boston; the Walnut Street Theatre in Philadelphia; and Ford's Opera House in Washington, D.C.

In August 1881, Rogers was cast in a production of The Connie Soogah with George Clarke, at the Madision Square Theatre in New York City after a trial run at the Academy Theatre in Buffalo. When the show played at the Windsor Theatre in Boston, The Boston Globe noted that "Leslie Edmunds did well as the 'fox-hunting squireen'". Next, he had a part in the American tour of The Colonel that started in late 1881. In May 1882, Rogers played the lead role twice as the understudy for Eric Bailey; the newspaper noted, "He acquitted himself exceedingly well."

In 1883, he joined the cast of the national tour of Brentwood, starring Pearl Eytinge, which opened at the People's Theater in St. Louis. However after just four weeks, Rogers and three others left the cast, leading a newspaper to speculated that the season "will no doubt be brought to a close at once." Some six week later, he was in a touring cast of My Partner. In a review of a performance in New Orleans, the newspaper noted, "The Ned Singleton of Mr. Leslie Edmunds is...excellent...." In 1983, he was cast in a leading role in "Youth".

In November 1883, he was the business manager of a play called The New Flying Dutchman at the Grand Opera House in Brooklyn, New York. When Dutchman toured in February 1884, Rogers shared top billing with C. P. Flockton as its producers; ads also noted the play was "under the sole management of Mr. Leslie Edmunds." He joined the cast of Kit, the Arkansas Traveller, the season opener at the Boston Theatre in August 1884. In December 1884, he had a role in Spot Cash but was fired when his wife, who was also a cast member got into an argument with the show's star and manager, Maurice Curtis, that led to a physical altercation.

He was a cast member in the production of Dr. Bazilos on Broadway in 1885. He was also cast in a touring production starring the Austrian actress Madame Antonie Janisch. In 1886, he joined the cast of Waiting For the Verdict, followed by roles in Ten Nights in a Bar-Room and A Grass Widow in 1887. In the fall of 1888 season, Rogers and his wife joined Arthur Rehan's comedy company in Montreal, performing in the plays Nancy & Co, 7–20–8 and Love and Harness. However, one critic wrote the following about his performance in the latter, "Mr. Leslie Edmunds, as an M.D., without practice, desperately in love and at once bashful and aggressive, made a decided hit, but there was a suspicion of excess in his perturbation, and he showed a tendency to indulge in a little horseplay when his lines demanded a frenzy of excitement." In the spring of 1889, the Rehan company took the plays on the road in Canada and the United States.

Rogers and his wife joined the touring company of Harry L. Hamlin and Paul M. Potter's The Fakir for the 1889 to 1890 season. In 1891, he joined the supporting cast of Jessie Daw, starring Hattie Harvey, at the Amphion Theatre in Brooklyn. This was followed by the couple supporting Katie Emmett in the tour of The Waifs on New York in 1991.

== Personal life ==
Rogers married Charlotte Matilda Leeds, an actress known as Leslie Edmunds from Massachusetts. He died December 19, 1893, in New York City of "nervous prostration". He was buried in the Rogers-Buchanan Family Cemetery in Druid Hill Park.
