= Gunnar Rasmussen =

Danish racewalker

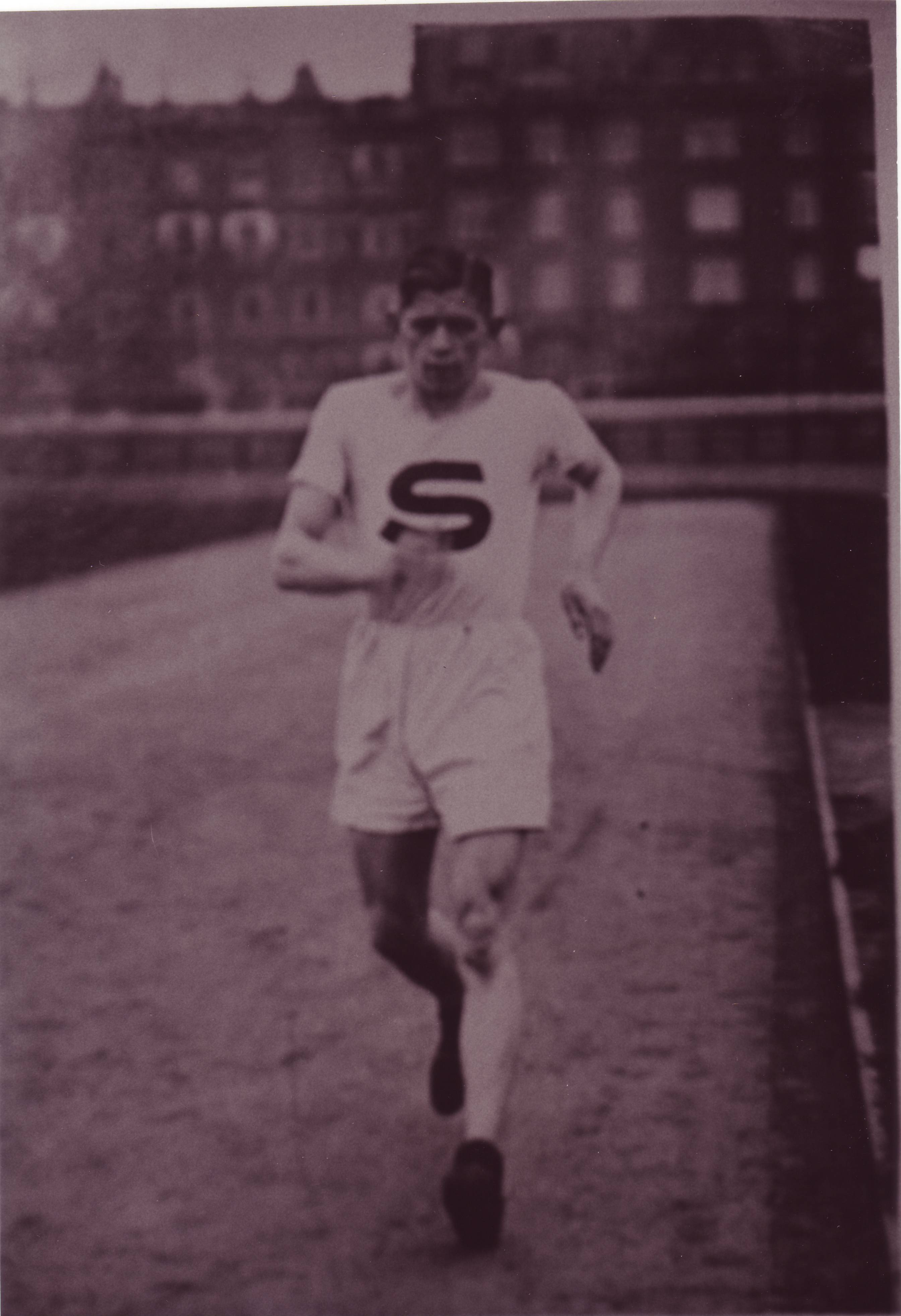

Personal information
- Nationality: Danish
- Born: 30 January 1894 Slagelse, Sjælland, Denmark
- Died: 5 December 1945 (aged 51) New York, USA

Sport
- Sport: Athletics
- Event: Racewalking
- Club: IF Sparta, København

Gunnar Rasmussen (30 January 1894 – 5 December 1945) was a Danish racewalker, who competed at the 1920 Summer Olympics.

== Career ==
Rasmussen finished second behind Robert Bridge in the 2 miles walk event at the British 1919 AAA Championships.

The following year at the 1920 Olympic Games, Rasmussen competed in the men's 10 kilometres walk.
