= Randolph Rose =

New Zealand athlete (1901–1989)

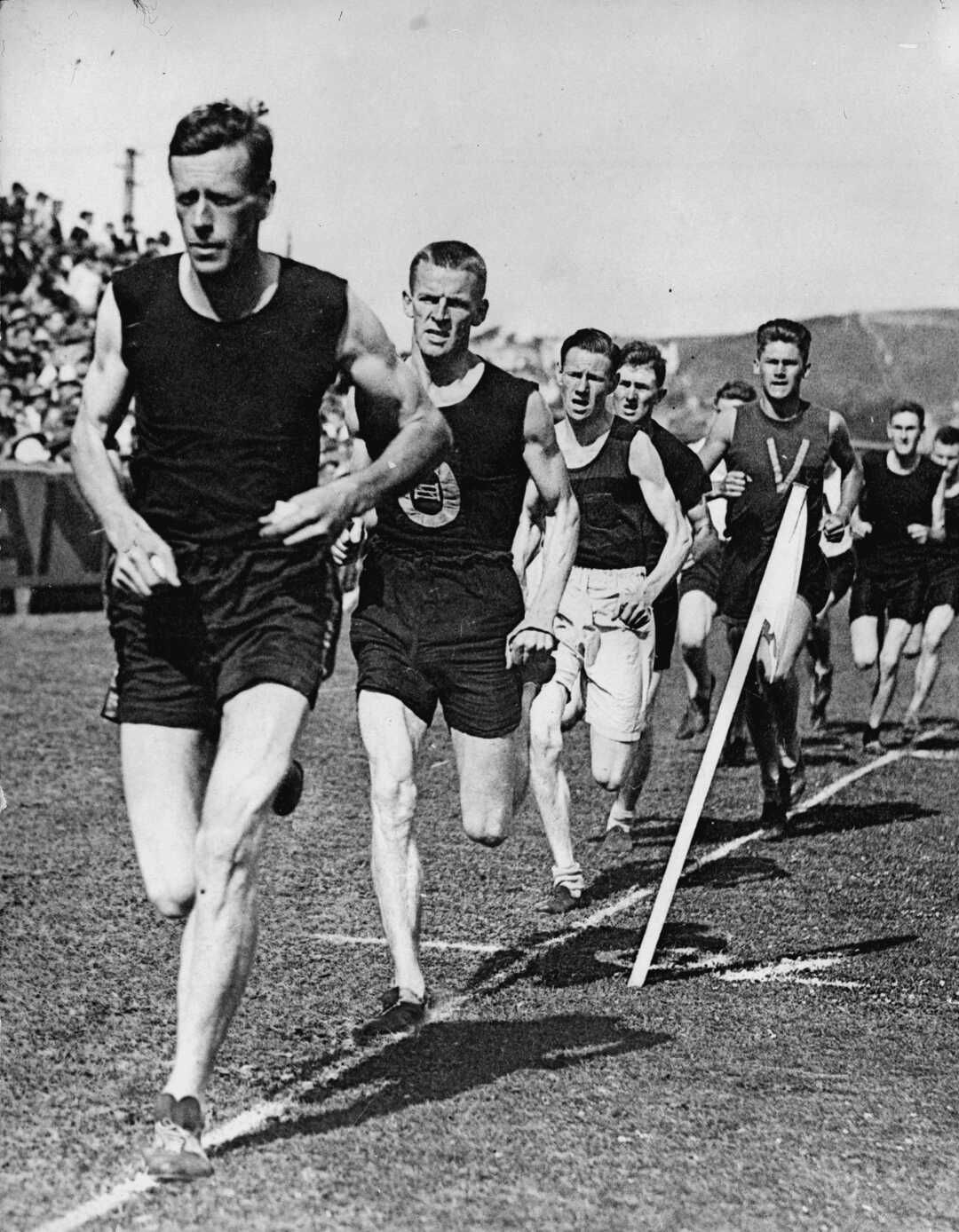
Randolph Rose leading a race, c. 1930s

Randolph Arthur John Scott Rose (25 December 1901 – 4 March 1989) was a New Zealand middle-distance runner. He was born in Wellington, New Zealand, in 1901. He came from a family of athletes, but lacked ambition and hardly ever trained. In his first year of competitive running, he won a three-mile race at Wellington's Basin Reserve so easily that he jumped the finish tape, and when he was disqualified by officials, he became an instant celebrity. He was Wellington champion in 1922, the New Zealand champion in the following year, and the Australasian champion in 1924. He missed the 1924 Summer Olympics as he had been operated for appendicitis in March 1924. When American runner Lloyd Hahn, who had come sixth in the 1500 metres at the Olympics, visited Wellington, they had five one-mile races. In front of crowds of up to 16,000, Hahn won the first race. This spurred Rose on to train for the first time in his life, and he won the four subsequent races. In the fourth race, he set a British Empire record. The New Zealand Amateur Athletic Association held national fund-raising events to be able to send Rose to Europe to compete there, and while he broke the French record over 3000 metres in 1926, he was then struck by influenza and missed all the important races. Rose did not want to go to the 1928 Summer Olympics; he declared himself "unavailable". He retired to his farm, did some more running for New Zealand, but finally retired in 1931 due to painful varicose veins.

Rose married his cousin, Doreen Burkitt Rose, on 8 August 1931 at Masterton; they were to have three children. He farmed with his brother near Whangamōmona in Taranaki. Rose was a shy and private man who would later work in Inglewood. His wife died in 1977. In the same year, he was inducted into the New Zealand Sports Hall of Fame. He died on 4 March 1989 at Bell Block.

Rose made the New Zealand public interested in running, and inspired many others to take up athletics.
