= Arthur St. Norman =

South African long-distance runner (1878 – 1956)

Personal information
- Nationality: South African
- Born: 20 October 1878 Brighton, England
- Died: 18 May 1956 (aged 77) Johannesburg, South Africa

Sport
- Sport: Long-distance running
- Event: Marathon

Arthur St. Norman (20 October 1878 – 18 May 1956) was a South African long-distance runner. He competed in the marathon and the 10km walk at the 1912 Summer Olympics.
