= Khalid Khannouchi =

Moroccan-born American long-distance runner (born 1971)

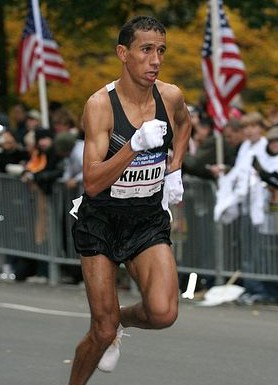

Personal information
- Born: September 12, 1971 (age 55) Meknes, Morocco

Sport
- Country: (Morocco) (United States)

Achievements and titles
- World finals: 2001; Marathon, DNF
- Personal bests: 5,000 m: 13:41.6; 10km (Road): 27:45; Half Marathon: 1:00:27 (1997); Marathon: 2:05:38 (2002)(former WR)
Medal record
Men’s athletics
World Marathon Majors
Representing Morocco
Gold medal – first place	1997 Chicago	Marathon
Gold medal – first place	1999 Chicago	Marathon
Silver medal – second place	1998 Chicago	Marathon
Representing United States
Gold medal – first place	2000 Chicago	Marathon
Gold medal – first place	2002 Chicago	Marathon
Gold medal – first place	2002 London	Marathon
Bronze medal – third place	2000 London	Marathon

Khalid Khannouchi (Arabic: خالد خنّوشي) (born September 12, 1971) is a Moroccan-born American retired long-distance runner. He is the former world record holder for the marathon and held the former road world best for the 20 km distance. He is one of only five men to break the marathon world record more than once, and one of only five to break their own marathon world record (the others are Jim Peters, Derek Clayton, Eliud Kipchoge, and Haile Gebrselassie).

Khalid fell out with the Moroccan athletics federation over training expenses and moved to Brooklyn, New York City in 1992 with three of his friends. He married American Sandra Inoa in 1996, who coached him and acted as his agent. They set up home in Ossining, New York. He became a naturalized citizen of the United States on May 2, 2000. He first gained broad renown by winning the 1997 Chicago Marathon by over a minute with a time of 2:07.10, breaking the 12-year old course record held by Steve Jones.

Khannouchi officially retired on March 27, 2012 due to recurring foot injuries since 2003. Khannouchi stated "It was really my feet that betrayed me. Every time I go and try to push hard, I get the pain and soreness again. I can't train hard and if you can't train at a certain level where you can be competitive it's not worth it to keep wasting time."

== Achievements ==
- 1993
  - World Student Games, winner of the men's 5000 metres in Buffalo.
- 1997
  - Cobán Half Marathon (Guatemala), winner (1:04:30).
  - Chicago Marathon, winner (2:07:10), at that time the fastest debut marathon in history and the fourth fastest marathon of all time.
- 1998
  - Chicago Marathon, second place (2:07:19)
  - Peachtree Road Race 10k, winner (27:47)
  - Falmouth Road Race 7.1 miles, winner (31:48)
  - New Haven 20K, winner in a world road record (57:37)
- 1999
  - Chicago Marathon, winner in world record time (2:05:42)
  - Peachtree Road Race 10k, winner (27:45)
- 2000
  - London Marathon, third place (2:08:36)
  - Chicago Marathon, winner in a new American record (2:07:01)
- 2002
  - London Marathon, winner in world record time (2:05:38)
  - Chicago Marathon, winner (2:05:56), becoming the first man in history to break 2:06 twice in one year
  - Ranked as the number #1 marathoner in the world by Track & Field News and their American Athlete of the Year.
- 2004
  - Chicago Marathon, fifth place (2:08:44)
- 2006
  - London Marathon, 4th place (2:07:04), coming back from a long period of injury.
- 2007
  - London Marathon, did not finish.
  - United States Olympic Marathon Trials in New York City, 4th place (2:12:34)

Khannouchi was the first marathoner to break 2:06:00. However, he lost the world record to Paul Tergat on September 28, 2003.

== Personal bests ==
Event	Best	Location	Date
5000 metres	13:44.39		1 January 1992
10 kilometres run	27:45	Atlanta, GA United States	4 July 1999
15 kilometres run	42:57	Utica, NY United States	12 July 1998
20 kilometres run	57:37	New Haven, CT United States	7 September 1998
Half marathon	1:00:27	Philadelphia, PA United States	28 September 1997
25 kilometres run	1:14:13	Chicago, IL United States	10 October 2004
30 kilometres run	1:29:01	London, England	14 April 2002
Marathon	2:05:38	London, England	14 April 2002

Records
Preceded by (Brazil) Ronaldo da Costa	Men's Marathon World Record Holder; October 24, 1999 – September 28, 2003	Succeeded by (Kenya) Paul Tergat
