= Lester Kelly =

Australian rules footballer

Personal information
- Full name: Lester Hamilton Kelly
- Born: 14 February 1892; Moonta, South Australia
- Died: 6 January 1958 (aged 65); Brighton, Victoria
- Original team: Wesley College
- Position: Half-back

Playing career^{1}
Years	Club	Games (Goals)
1912–14	University	40 (0)
- ^{1} Playing statistics correct to the end of 1914.

Lester Hamilton Kelly (14 February 1892 – 6 January 1958) was an Australian rules footballer who played with the Melbourne University Football Club in the Victorian Football League (VFL).

== Family ==
The son of Rev. Robert Kelly, and Mary Kelly, née Steer, Lester Hamilton Kelly was born at Moonta, South Australia on 14 February 1892. He married Christina Maude Howard in 1916.

== Education ==
Educated at Wesley College, and the University of Melbourne, he was an outstanding athlete, and was the first Australian schoolboy to high-jump six feet.

At the Wesley College Sports on 21 October 1910, Kelly won the Open shot put (32 ft 10in), the open long jump (20 ft 8½in), the open 220 yards (23 1/5 secs.), and was second ("by inches") in the open 100 yards.

== Football ==
All of the 40 games he played with University resulted in losses. Kelly played the most games without recording a win of all players in the history of the Victorian Football League.

== Military service ==
He enlisted in the First AIF on 17 August 1914.

== Schoolmaster ==
On his return to Australia, he was a member of the teaching staff at Wesley College.

== Death ==
He died on 6 January 1958.
