= Max Kroger =

Australian rules footballer

Personal information
- Full name: Max Wylie Kroger
- Born: 14 March 1899; Tylden, Victoria
- Died: 3 April 1989 (aged 90)
- Height: 183 cm (6 ft 0 in)
- Weight: 77 kg (170 lb)

Playing career^{1}
Years	Club	Games (Goals)
1919–22, 1924	Geelong	42 (5)
- ^{1} Playing statistics correct to the end of 1924.

Max Wylie Kroger (14 March 1899 – 3 April 1989) was an Australian rules footballer who played with Geelong in the Victorian Football League (VFL).

An all-round sportsman, Kroger won the decathlon and came second in the pole vault at the 1926 Australasian championships.
