= Charles Wiggers =

Belgian racewalker

Personal information
- Full name: Carolus Wiggers
- Nationality: Belgian
- Born: 10 October 1891 Berchem, Belgium
- Died: Unknown

Sport
- Sport: Athletics
- Event: Racewalking

Charles Wiggers (born 10 October 1891) was a Belgian racewalker. He competed in the men's 10 kilometres walk at the 1920 Summer Olympics.
