= 2002 London Marathon =

22nd London Marathon

22nd London Marathon
- Venue: London, United Kingdom
- Date: 14 April 2002

Champions
- Men: Khalid Khannouchi (2:05:38)
- Women: Paula Radcliffe (2:18:56)
- Wheelchair men: David Weir (1:39:44)
- Wheelchair women: Tanni Grey-Thompson (2:22:51)

The 2002 London Marathon was the 22nd running of the annual marathon race in London, United Kingdom, which took place on Sunday, 14 April. The elite men's race was won by Khalid Khannouchi of the United States in a time of 2:05:38 hours and the women's race was won by home athlete Paula Radcliffe in 2:18:56. Khannouchi's time was a marathon world record, improving on his own record by four seconds. Radcliffe was also close to a world record, just nine seconds off the time set by Catherine Ndereba the previous year.

In the wheelchair races, Britain's David Weir (1:39:44) and Britain's Tanni Grey-Thompson (2:22:51) won the men's and women's divisions, respectively – with Grey-Thompson winning for the sixth time.

Around 99,000 people applied to enter the race, of which 46,083 had their applications accepted and 33,297 started the race. A total of 32,536 runners finished the race, comprising 24,768 men and 7768 women.

== Results ==
=== Men ===
Position	Athlete	Nationality	Time
1st place, gold medalist(s)	Khalid Khannouchi	United States	2:05:38 WR
2nd place, silver medalist(s)	Paul Tergat	Kenya	2:05:48
3rd place, bronze medalist(s)	Haile Gebrselassie	Ethiopia	2:06:35
4	Abdelkader El Mouaziz	Morocco	2:06:52
5	Ian Syster	South Africa	2:07:06
6	Stefano Baldini	Italy	2:07:29
7	António Pinto	Portugal	2:09:10
8	Mark Steinle	United Kingdom	2:09:17
9	Tesfaye Jifar	Ethiopia	2:09:50
10	Mohamed El Hattab	Morocco	2:11:50
11	Michael Buchleitner	Austria	2:14:11
12	Rachid Ghanmouni	Morocco	2:15:29
13	William Kiplagat	Kenya	2:15:59
14	William Burns	Switzerland	2:17:36
15	Dan Robinson	United Kingdom	2:17:51
16	Julius Kimutai	Kenya	2:18:13
17	Nicholas Wetheridge	United Kingdom	2:19:41
18	Runar Höiom	Sweden	2:20:36
19	Damon Harris	Australia	2:20:44
20	Christopher Cariss	United Kingdom	2:20:45
—	Worku Bikila	Ethiopia	DNF
—	Joseph Kariuki	Kenya	DNF
—	Luís Jesus	Portugal	DNF
—	Alberto Chaíça	Portugal	DNF

=== Women ===
Position	Athlete	Nationality	Time
1st place, gold medalist(s)	Paula Radcliffe	United Kingdom	2:18:56
2nd place, silver medalist(s)	Svetlana Zakharova	Russia	2:22:31
3rd place, bronze medalist(s)	Lyudmila Petrova	Russia	2:22:33
4	Reiko Tosa	Japan	2:22:46
5	Susan Chepkemei	Kenya	2:23:19
6	Joyce Chepchumba	Kenya	2:26:53
7	Silviya Skvortsova	Russia	2:27:07
8	Zinaida Semenova	Russia	2:27:45
9	Derartu Tulu	Ethiopia	2:28:37
10	Shitaye Gemechu	Ethiopia	2:28:58
11	Irina Safarova	Russia	2:29:20
12	Jo Lodge	United Kingdom	2:38:25
13	Helene Willix	Sweden	2:40:24
14	Beverley Jenkins	United Kingdom	2:44:32
15	Alison Fletcher	United Kingdom	2:44:42
16	Sharon Dixon	United Kingdom	2:45:05
17	Ruth Pickvance	United Kingdom	2:45:34
18	Annette Wolfrom	Germany	2:46:58
19	Clare Pauzers	United Kingdom	2:49:26
20	Sarah Mycroft	Australia	2:49:38
—	Iness Chepkesis Chenonge	Kenya	DNF
—	Maria Guida	Italy	DNF

=== Wheelchair men ===
Position	Athlete	Nationality	Time
1st place, gold medalist(s)	David Weir	United Kingdom	1:39:44
2nd place, silver medalist(s)	Tushar Patel	United Kingdom	1:41:17
3rd place, bronze medalist(s)	Denis Lemeunier	France	1:41:17
4	Paul Nunnari	Australia	1:41:17
5	Chris Madden	United Kingdom	1:55:57
6	Jason Gill	United Kingdom	1:56:49
7	Pierre Fairbank	France	1:57:48
8	John Hanks	United Kingdom	2:01:39
9	Gregory Leray	France	2:01:41
10	Richie Powell	United Kingdom	2:01:45

=== Wheelchair women ===
Position	Athlete	Nationality	Time
1st place, gold medalist(s)	Tanni Grey-Thompson	United Kingdom	2:22:51
2nd place, silver medalist(s)	Michelle Lewis	United Kingdom	2:37:07
3rd place, bronze medalist(s)	Paula Craig	United Kingdom	2:48:53
