= Jean Seghers =

Belgian racewalker

Personal information
- Nationality: Belgian
- Born: 27 November 1893 Molenbeek-Saint-Jean, Belgium

Sport
- Sport: Athletics
- Event: Racewalking

Jean Seghers (born 27 November 1893, date of death unknown) was a Belgian racewalker. He competed in the men's 10 kilometres walk at the 1920 Summer Olympics.
