= Rudolf Richter =

Czech racewalker

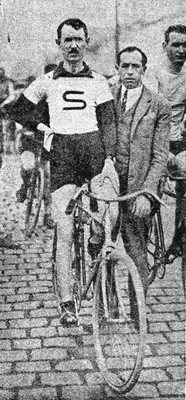

Personal information
- Nationality: BOH
- Born: 7 April 1883 Prague, Austria-Hungary
- Died: 5 January 1962 (aged 78) Prague, Czechoslovakia

Sport
- Sport: Athletics
- Event: Racewalking

Rudolf Richter (7 April 1883 – 5 January 1962) was a Bohemian racewalker. He competed in the 10 km walk at the 1912 Summer Olympics.
