= Charles Stuart (runner) =

Australian sprinter

Personal information
- Nationality: Australian
- Born: 1 February 1907
- Died: 6 April 1970 (aged 63)

Sport
- Sport: Sprinting
- Event: 400 metres

Charles Stuart (1 February 1907 – 6 April 1970) was an Australian sprinter. He competed in the men's 400 metres at the 1928 Summer Olympics.
