= Charles Dowson =

British racewalker

Personal information
- Nationality: British (English)
- Born: 16 November 1889 London, England
- Died: 5 February 1980 (aged 90) London, England

Sport
- Sport: Athletics
- Event: Racewalking
- Club: Queens Park Harriers

Achievements and titles
- Personal bests: 3 km walk: 13:28 (1920) 2 mile walk: 14:32 (1920) 7 mile walk: 53:31.2 (1919)

Charles Samuel Dowson (16 November 1889 – 5 February 1980) was a British racewalker, who competed at the 1920 Summer Olympics.

== Career ==
Dowson finished second behind William Hehir in the 7 miles walk event at the 1919 AAA Championships. Dowson then became the national 2 miles walk champion and the national 7 miles walk national champion after winning the AAA Championships titles at the 1920 AAA Championships.

One month later, he competed at the 1920 Olympic Games in Antwerp, Belgium. Dowson competed in the 3 km walk and the 10 km walk events.
