= Ernie Austen =

Australian racewalker

Personal information
- Full name: Ernest Elliott Austen
- Nationality: Australian
- Born: 25 July 1891
- Died: 21 May 1985 (aged 93)

Sport
- Sport: Athletics
- Event: Racewalking

Ernest Elliott Austen (25 July 1891 – 21 May 1985) was an Australian racewalker. He competed in the men's 10 kilometres walk at the 1924 Summer Olympics.
