= George Hyde (athlete) =

Australian long-distance runner

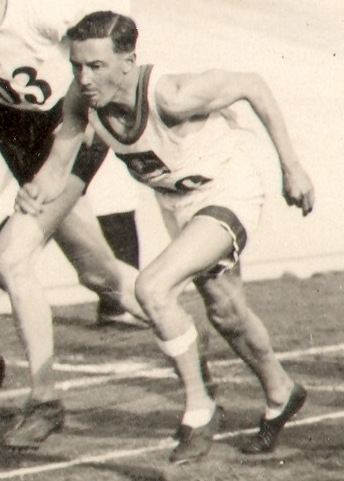
George Hyde in 1928

George Hyde (6 May 1905 – 29 May 1975) was an Australian long-distance runner who competed in the 1928 Summer Olympics.
