= Dad Wheatley =

Australian athletics competitor

Personal information
- Full name: Alfred William Gregory Wheatley
- Nickname: dad
- Nationality: Australian
- Born: Alfred William Gregory; 20 October 1882 St Kilda, Victoria, Australia
- Died: 1 March 1961 (aged 78)

Sport
- Country: Australia
- Sport: Track and field

Alfred William Gregory "Dad" Wheatley (20 October 1882 – 1 March 1961), born in St Kilda, Victoria, was an Australian sportsman. He competed in the 1906 Intercalated Games as a middle distance runner.

Wheatley, running for the East Melbourne Harriers, won the 880 yard and 1 mile events at the 1905 Australian Athletics Championships. The following year he sailed to Athens to compete in the 1906 Intercalated Games, he entered two events, the 800 metres and the 1500 metres. In the 800 metres he had to be content with third place in his heat and so didn't qualify for the final. He fared better in the 1500 metres, finishing fourth in his heat which was good enough to qualify for the final, in the final, he was in second place on entering the final lap, but in the end he finished in fourth place, 13 yards behind the bronze medal position.

Three years later in 1909, Wheatley again won the 880 yard and 1 mile events at the Australian Athletics Championships.

In 1912, while attempting to gain selection for the 1912 Summer Olympics, Wheatley broke down in training and was forced to retire from competitive athletics.

When his brother Noel, was killed in the Gallipoli Campaign in 1915, Wheatley signed up with the Australian forces and served four years across Europe and Egypt, reaching the rank of Sergeant-Major.

Wheatley was an accountant by profession and died in 1961, aged 78 years old.
