= Paul Verlaeckt =

Belgian racewalker

Personal information
- Nationality: Belgian

Sport
- Sport: Athletics
- Event: Racewalking

Paul Verlaeckt was a Belgian racewalker. He competed in the men's 10 kilometres walk at the 1920 Summer Olympics.
