= George Parker (race walker) =

Australian racewalker

Medal record

Men's athletics

Representing Australia

Olympic Games
Silver medal – second place	1920 Antwerp	3000 metre walk

George R. Parker (19 November 1897 – 18 June 1974) was an Australian athlete who competed mainly in racewalking. He competed for Australia in the 1920 Summer Olympics held in Antwerp, Belgium in the 3000 metre walk where he won the silver medal.
