= Eversleigh Freeman =

Canadian racewalker (1893–1973)

Personal information
- Full name: Eversleigh Campbell Freeman
- Nationality: Canadian
- Born: 2 January 1893 Half Way Tree, Jamaica
- Died: 30 June 1973 (aged 80)

Sport
- Sport: Athletics
- Event: Racewalking

Eversleigh Campbell Freeman (2 January 1893 – 30 June 1973) was a Canadian racewalker. He competed in the men's 10 kilometres walk at the 1920 Summer Olympics and the 1924 Summer Olympics.
