= Niels Pedersen (athlete) =

Danish racewalker

Personal information
- Nationality: Danish
- Born: 5 August 1888
- Died: 4 January 1968 (aged 79)

Sport
- Sport: Athletics
- Event: Racewalking

Niels Pedersen (5 August 1888 – 4 January 1968) was a Danish racewalker. He competed in the 10 kilometres walk at the 1912 Summer Olympics and the 1920 Summer Olympics.
