= Nigel Barker (sprinter) =

Australian sprinter (1883–1948)

Medal record

Men's athletics

Representing Australia

Intercalated Games
Bronze medal – third place	1906 Athens	100 metres
Bronze medal – third place	1906 Athens	400 metres

Nigel Chase Barker (26 February 1883 – 31 July 1948) was an Australian track and field athlete, who is regarded as holder of Australia's first athletics world record, in the 400 yards, and is an Intercalated Games bronze medalist.

Barker was born in Sydney and attended Newington College (1895–1901) and the University of Sydney. He is described in the official Olympic history of Australia as "an outstanding all-rounder". He played representative rugby union for New South Wales, and was twice selected for Australia in rugby but was forced to decline on both occasions. In 1904, Barker was selected for the St. Louis Games, but injured an ankle playing rugby.

A public subscription raised the funds for Barker to compete in Athens for the 1906 Intercalated Games, at the games he competed in two events, first up was the 100 metres, in the first round he finished in second place behind American Lawson Robertson, in the semi-finals he finished second again, one yard behind another American William Eaton, in the final, running from lane 2, he finished in third place for the bronze medal behind another two Americans, Archie Hahn and Fay Moulton. On the same day as the 100 metres final, he also competed in the 400 metres, in his first-round heat he won in a time of 53 seconds and qualified for the final, after a couple of days' rest he finished again in bronze medal position behind Paul Pilgrim and James Lightbody.

At the end of his athletic career Barker had won ten National Championship titles from 1903 to 1910.

Since 2012, University of Sydney have awarded the Nigel C Barker Medal for Sport Achievement named in his honour.
