= Takeshi So =

Japanese long-distance runner

Personal information
- Born: 9 January 1953 (age 73) Usuki, Ōita, Japan

Sport
- Country: Japan
- Sport: Athletics
- Event: Marathon

Achievements and titles
- Personal best: Marathon: 2:08:55 (Tokyo 1983)
Medal record
Men's athletics
Representing Japan
Asian Championships
Bronze medal – third place	1979 Tokyo	10,000 m

Takeshi So (宗猛, Sō Takeshi; born January 9, 1953 in Usuki, Ōita) is a retired long-distance runner from Japan, who represented his native country at the 1984 Summer Olympics in Los Angeles, California.

== Career ==
So won the 1976 edition of the Košice Peace Marathon in Czechoslovakia. His twin brother Shigeru So (宗茂, Sō Shigeru) is also a retired Olympic marathoner.

In 1984, So represented Japan at the 1984 Summer Olympics in Los Angeles, where he finished just outside the medals in fourth place.

He trained 2016 Olympics marathon runner Satoru Sasaki and runs the marathon program for the Japan Association of Athletics Federations.

His PR in the marathon was 2:08:55 at the 1983 Tokyo Marathon, finishing second, 17 seconds behind fellow Japanese runner Toshihiko Seko.

== Achievements ==
Year	Competition	Venue	Position	Event	Notes
Representing Japan
1975	Fukuoka Marathon	Fukuoka, Japan	6th	Marathon	2:12:52
1976	Košice Peace Marathon	Košice, Czechoslovakia	1st	Marathon	2:18:42
1978	Beppu-Ōita Marathon	Beppu-Ōita, Japan	2nd	Marathon	2:12:49
1978	Lake Biwa Marathon	Ōtsu, Japan	1st	Marathon	2:15:15
1979	Lake Biwa Marathon	Ōtsu, Japan	4th	Marathon	2:14:30
1979	Open Spartakiada Marathon	Moscow, Russia	10th	Marathon	2:15:01
1979	Fukuoka Marathon	Fukuoka, Japan	3rd	Marathon	2:10:40
1980	Fukuoka Marathon	Fukuoka, Japan	2nd	Marathon	2:09:49
1981	Beppu-Ōita Marathon	Beppu-Ōita, Japan	2nd	Marathon	2:11:31
1981	Fukuoka Marathon	Fukuoka, Japan	5th	Marathon	2:11:29
1983	Tokyo Marathon	Tokyo, Japan	2nd	Marathon	2:08:55
1983	Fukuoka Marathon	Fukuoka, Japan	4th	Marathon	2:09:17
1984	Olympic Games	Los Angeles, United States	4th	Marathon	2:10:55
1985	IAAF World Marathon Cup	Hiroshima, Japan	8th	Marathon	2:11:01
1985	Beijing Marathon	Beijing, PR China	2nd	Marathon	2:10:23
1988	Beijing Marathon	Beijing, PR China	3rd	Marathon	2:10:40
1989	1989 World Marathon Cup	Milan, Italy	8th	Marathon	2:12:53
1990	Lake Biwa Marathon	Ōtsu, Japan	2nd	Marathon	2:13:58
1990	International Peace Marathon	Moscow, Russia	3rd	Marathon	2:15:21
1991	Tokyo Marathon	Tokyo, Japan	11th	Marathon	2:12:37
1991	London Marathon	London, United Kingdom	27th	Marathon	2:13:15
1993	Beppu-Ōita Marathon	Beppu, Ōita, Japan	7th	Marathon	2:15:32
1993	Hōfu Marathon	Hōfu, Japan	5th	Marathon	2:15:58
