= April 1966 =

Month of 1966

<<	April 1966					>>
Su	Mo	Tu	We	Th	Fr	Sa
					1	2
3	4	5	6	7	8	9
10	11	12	13	14	15	16
17	18	19	20	21	22	23
24	25	26	27	28	29	30

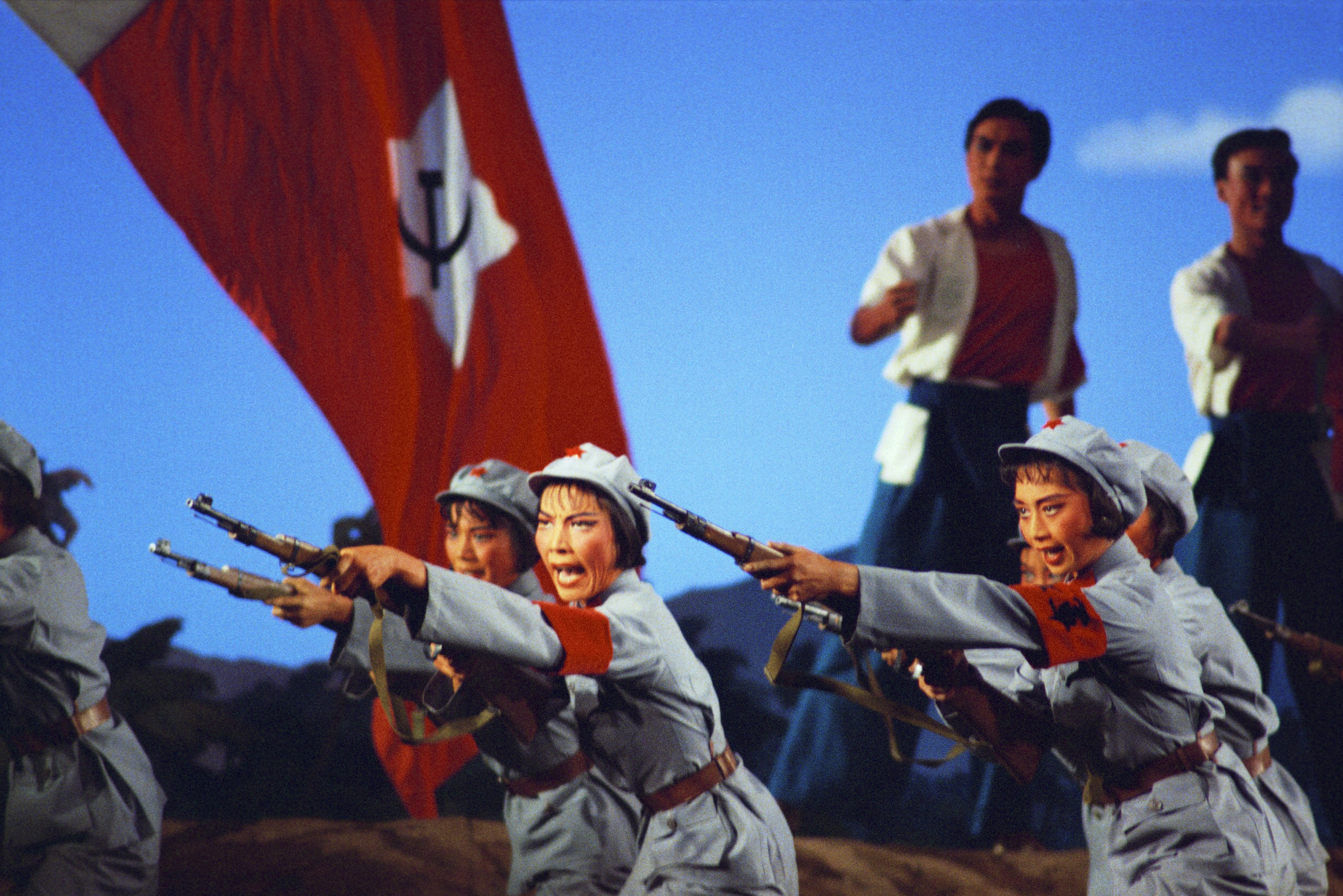
April 18, 1966: Cultural Revolution proclaimed in China (image from a 1972 play)

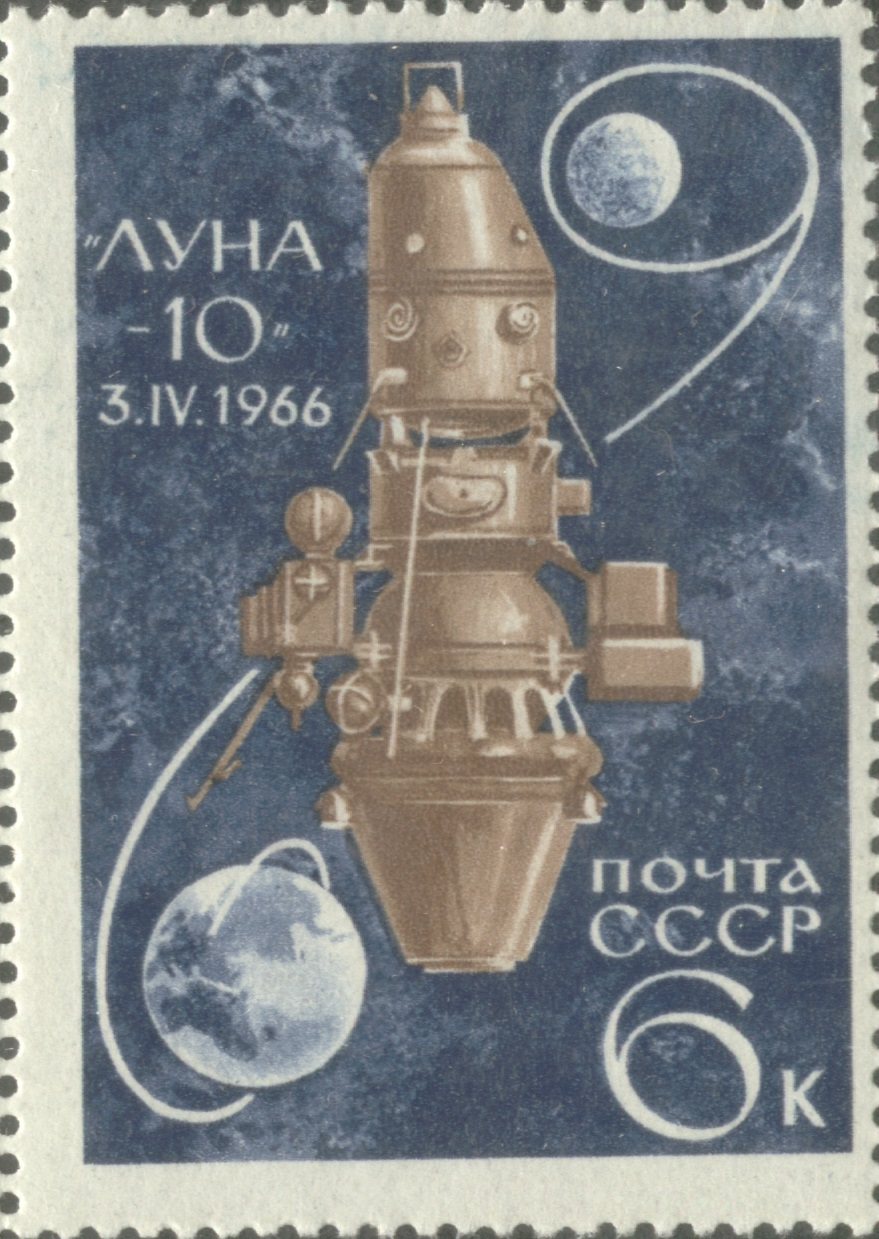
April 3, 1966: USSR's Luna 10 becomes first Earth object to orbit the Moon

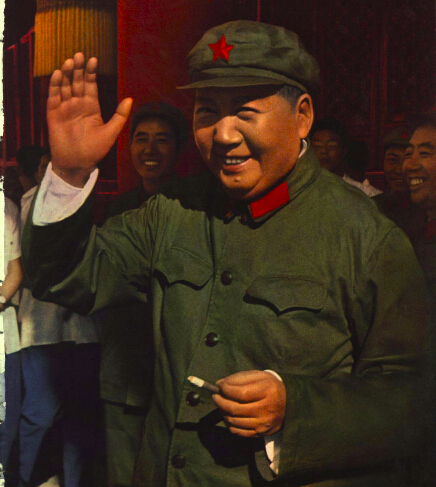
Chairman Mao Zedong, who implemented the Cultural Revolution

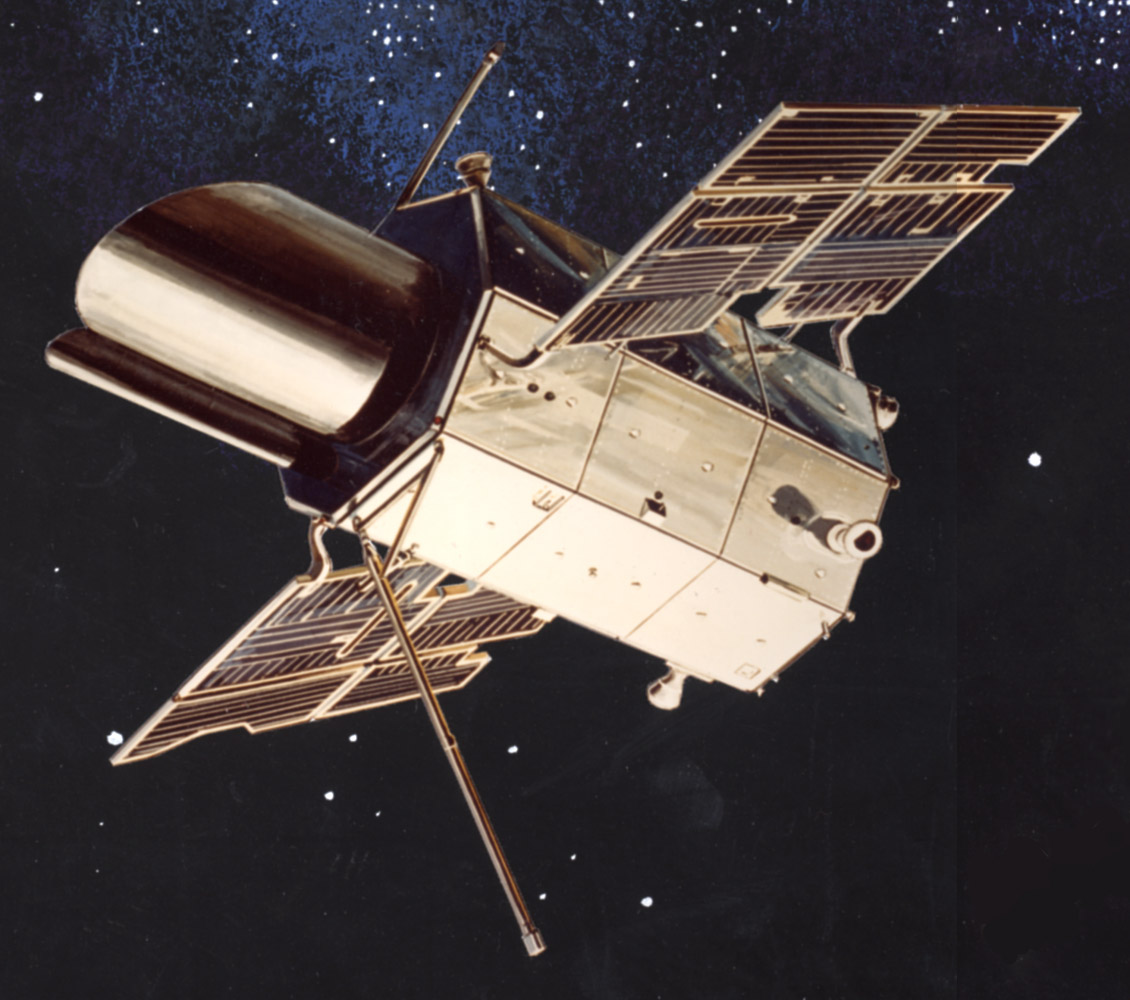
April 8, 1966: U.S. launches first astronomical observatory to orbit the Earth

The following events occurred in April 1966:

== April 1, 1966 (Friday) ==
- General Pham Xuan Chieu, a member of South Vietnam's 10-man military junta who was appearing as an emissary of Vietnam's Prime Minister Nguyễn Cao Kỳ to seek popular support, was surrounded by a mob of 1,000 students and Buddhist activists as he arrived at city government offices. The group then held him captive, transported him around the city in a cycle rickshaw, forced him to make a speech at the local radio station, and then released him unharmed.
- At the Communist Party Congress, Soviet Defense Minister Rodion Malinovsky made a cryptic reference to "the blue belt" of national defense, then discussed recently constructed intercontinental ballistic missiles and nuclear submarines, along with other weapons that could destroy "any planes and many rockets of the adversary".
- The long-running Christian telethon The 700 Club was broadcast for the first time on the Christian Broadcasting Network. Pat Robertson would host The 700 Club from 1966 until his retirement in 2021.
- Born:
  - Janette Rallison, American writer; mother of YouTuber and cartoonist Robert J. Rallison ("TheOdd1sOut"); in Pullman, Washington
  - Chris Evans, English television and radio presenter; in Warrington
- Died: Brian O'Nolan, 54, Irish humorist who wrote under the pen names "Flann O'Brien" and "Myles na Gopaleen"; of throat cancer

== April 2, 1966 (Saturday) ==
- Ten thousand protesters (including 2,000 South Vietnamese soldiers and sailors in uniform) marched through the streets of Da Nang in South Vietnam and denounced both the United States and the South Vietnamese government of Prime Minister Nguyen Cao Ky. Da Nang Mayor Nguyen Van Man, who had allowed protesters free use of city offices, motor vehicles and printing facilities, was accused of treason by Ky, who said that he planned to have Man executed by a firing squad.
- People's Daily, the official newspaper of the Chinese Communist Party, published an editorial by cultural critic Qi Benyu, titled "On the Essence of 'Han Rui Scolding the Emperor' and 'Hai Rui Dismissed from Office'", in what would be a prelude for the Party's calls for a violent public uprising.
- On his fourth day in office, Ecuador's new President, Clemente Yerovi, announced that he was cancelling a presidential election that had been scheduled for July.
- Died: C. S. Forester (Cecil Louis Troughton Smith), 66, English adventure novelist known for the Horatio Hornblower series

== April 3, 1966 (Sunday) ==
- A North Sea gale ran the British passenger ship Anzio aground at Donna Nook, Lincolnshire, near the mouth of the Humber River, and it was demolished. The ship, which had recently been purchased and was en route from London to Inverness to be delivered to its new owners, was occupied only by its skipper, Adam Fotheringham, and twelve other crewmembers. There were no survivors. The bodies of ten men, all wearing life jackets but killed after being battered by debris and the rocks, washed ashore on the beach, while three men (including Captain Fotheringham) were presumed to have gone down with the ship.
- At 18:44 UTC (9:44 p.m. in Moscow), the Soviet lunar probe Luna 10 became the first human-made object to orbit the Moon. Luna 10 would make a complete trip around the Moon every three hours and would transmit signals back to Earth until May 30.
- Died: Battista Farina, 72, Italian car designer

== April 4, 1966 (Monday) ==
- NASA announced the names of its fifth group of astronauts, 19 men qualified for missions in the 1970s. From the fifth generation of explorers came Apollo astronauts Fred Haise and Jack Swigert (Apollo 13), Edgar Mitchell and Stuart Roosa (Apollo 14), James Irwin and Alfred Worden (Apollo 15), Charles Duke and Ken Mattingly (Apollo 16), Ronald Evans (Apollo 17) and Vance D. Brand (Apollo-Soyuz); Skylab astronauts Paul J. Weitz (Skylab 2), Jack R. Lousma (Skylab 3) and Gerald P. Carr and William R. Pogue (Skylab 4); and Space Shuttle astronauts Joe Engle, Don L. Lind and Bruce McCandless II. Two would not go into outer space; John S. Bull would be disqualified by a medical condition, while Edward Givens would be killed in an automobile accident in 1967.
- So Sau Chung began a hunger strike at the entrance of the Star Ferry Terminal in Hong Kong's Central District, sparking the Hong Kong 1966 riots. At issue was the recent announcement that the fare for ferry boats would be increased by one cent; the next day, hundreds of youths joined him in a protest. Within days, thousands of young protesters were setting fires, smashing glass windows, and battling British colonial police.
- A deadly tornado family affected the I-4 corridor in Central Florida from the Tampa Bay area to Brevard County. Eleven people were killed across the state in what remains one of only two F4 tornadoes ever to strike that U.S. state.
- Born:
  - Brother Marquis (stage name for Mark D. Ross), American rapper for 2 Live Crew; in Rochester, New York
  - Viceregal, Canadian Champion Thoroughbred racehorse (d. 1984); at Windfields Farm

== April 5, 1966 (Tuesday) ==
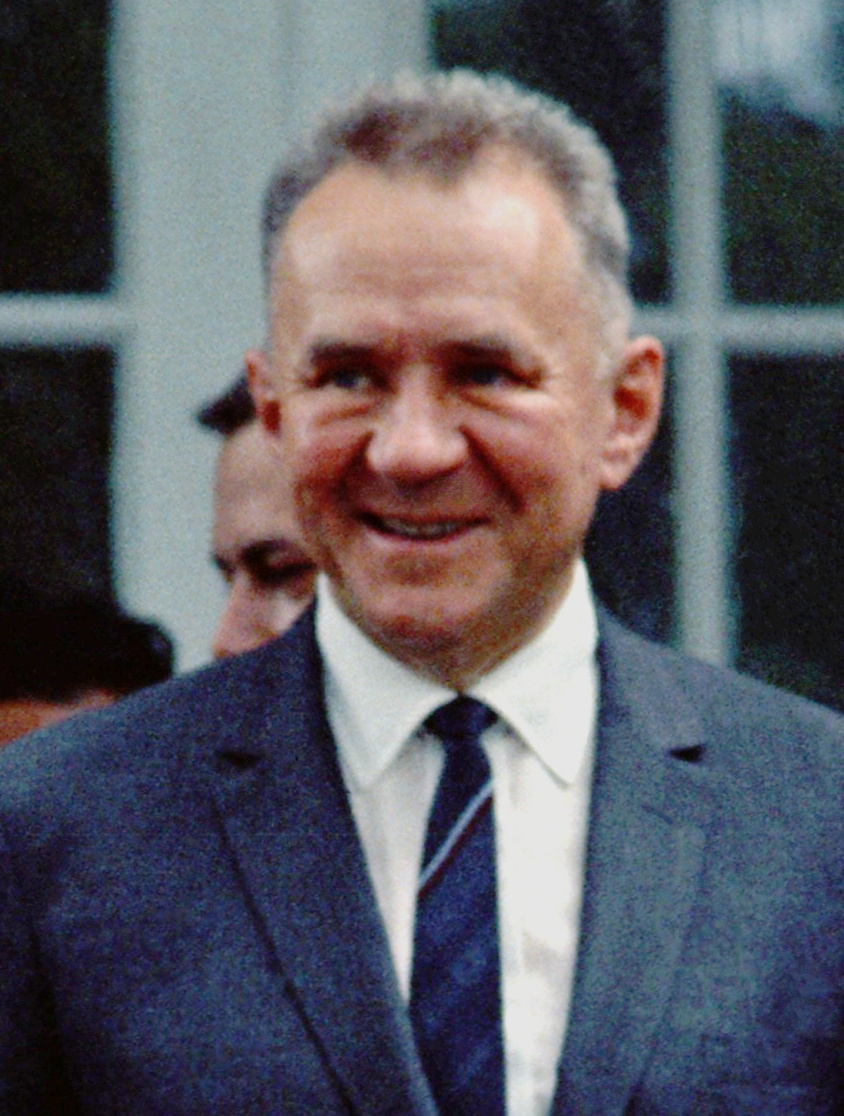
Premier Kosygin

- Soviet Prime Minister Alexei Kosygin said in a speech to the 23rd Communist Party Congress that the nation would begin measuring economic success by profits rather than by achievement of production target quantities. Starting in 1967, Kosygin said, nearly one-third of factory workers would be eligible for incentive bonuses. He asked the Party Congress to approve a new Five Year Economic Plan implementing the changes.

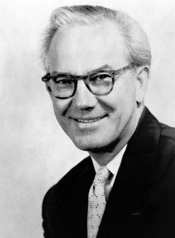
Congressman Rivers

- The first Congressional hearing about unidentified flying objects (UFOs) was convened in Washington, D.C., before the House Armed Services Committee, chaired by U.S. Representative L. Mendel Rivers of South Carolina. The request for the Congressional investigation had been made by House Republican leader (and future U.S. President) Gerald R. Ford of Michigan.
- Acting upon authority granted by NASA Headquarters and approval of Manned Spacecraft Center (MSC)'s statement of work, Kenneth S. Kleinknecht, MSC Gemini Program Deputy Manager, informed officials in Washington and Huntsville that Houston had presented requests for proposals to Douglas, Grumman, and McDonnell to undertake definition studies on the Saturn S-IVB spent-stage experiment support module (SSESM).
- NBC television broadcast the final original episode of Dr. Kildare. In its final season, the popular show had been moved from one hour on Thursday nights, to half-hour programs shown on Monday and Tuesday, "with disastrous results", and was canceled after poor ratings.
- In an attempt to suppress the Buddhist Uprising, South Vietnamese prime minister and strongman Nguyễn Cao Kỳ personally attempted to lead the capture of the restive city of Đà Nẵng before backing down.
- The International Convention on Load Lines was signed in London.

== April 6, 1966 (Wednesday) ==
- The Beatles began their "Studio Years", discontinuing public concerts in favor of simply releasing new albums and singles for sale, as the first song was recorded for their upcoming album Revolver. That session, with John Lennon singing "Tomorrow Never Knows", marked the first use of automatic double tracking (ADT), invented by EMI recording engineer Ken Townsend, and the first to include music played backwards.
- Reginald Prentice replaced Charles Pannell as Minister of Public Buildings and Works and George Thomson replaced Douglas Houghton as Chancellor of the Duchy of Lancaster in the British government. The Earl of Longford succeeded Sir Frank Soskice as Lord Privy Seal, and Frederick Lee became Secretary of State for the Colonies.
- The first secret meeting concerning the merger of professional football's National Football League and the American Football League took place at a parking lot in Dallas, between Dallas Cowboys owner Tex Schramm and Kansas City Chiefs owner Lamar Hunt.
- Mihir Sen of the Bihar state in India became the first person to swim across the 33-mile (53 km) wide Palk Strait between India and Sri Lanka, arriving at Dhanushkodi on India's Pamban Island 25 hours and 36 minutes after departing Sri Lanka.
- Born:
  - Vince Flynn, American thriller novelist known for the "Mitch Rapp" series of political thrillers, starting with 1999's Transfer of Power (d. 2013); in St. Paul, Minnesota
  - Elizabeth Fitzel, a woman who was held captive in a cellar for 24 years by her father, Josef Fritzl; in Amstetten, Lower Austria

== April 7, 1966 (Thursday) ==
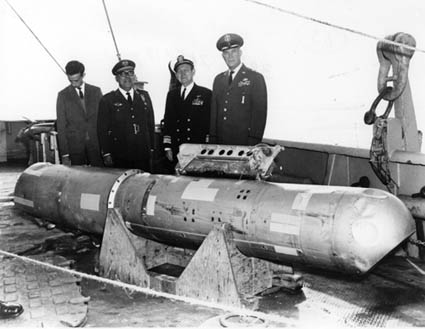
H-Bomb recovered

- After an 80-day operation in the Mediterranean Sea, the United States finally recovered the hydrogen bomb that had been lost off of the coast of Spain. After being raised from the sea by a winch, the bomb was loaded onto the rescue ship USS Petrel (ASR-14) and shipped back to the United States.
- Police in Japan arrested Dr. Mitsuru Suzuki at the Chiba University Hospital, where he was employed as a bacteriologist. Between December 25, 1964, and March 15, 1966, Dr. Suzuki had deliberately infected 200 people— four of them fatally— including many of his co-workers, with various diseases from bacteria that he had placed into food. Over a period of 15 months, he laced a sponge cake with dysentery; and medicines, shellfish, a cake, bananas, and bottles of a soft drink with typhoid. Suzuki was prosecuted for 66 cases of infecting people, but not for any of the deaths.
- The United Kingdom asked the United Nations Security Council for authority to use force to stop the Joanna V, an oil tanker that, anchored outside the harbor, was loading petroleum at a port in Portuguese East Africa (now Mozambique) and preparing to violate the United Nations embargo against Rhodesia (now Zimbabwe).
- Test pilot Robert G. Ferry landed a Hughes OH-6A Pawnee helicopter in Ormond Beach, Florida, after flying 2,213.1 miles (3,561.6 km) from Culver City, California, without refueling, to set the record for the longest non-stop helicopter flight.

== April 8, 1966 (Friday) ==
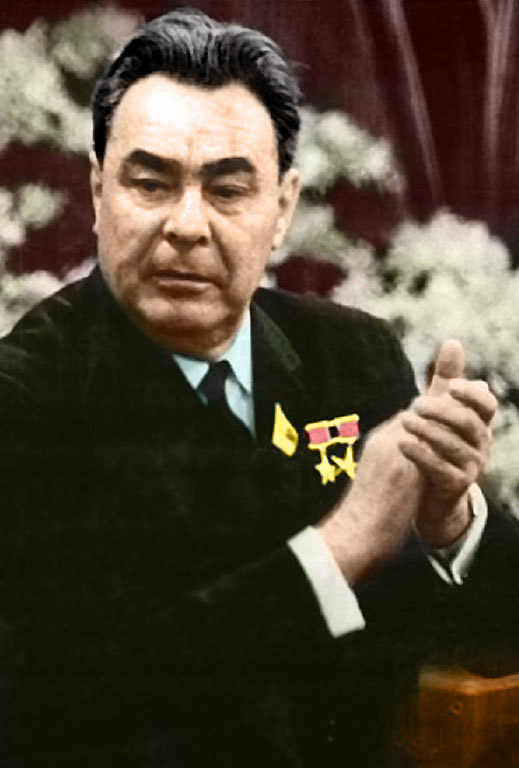
Secretary Brezhnev

- Leonid Brezhnev, First Secretary of the Communist Party of the Soviet Union since replacing Nikita Khrushchev in 1964, was unanimously elected by the Party's Central Committee as the party's leader, now referred to as the General Secretary of the Communist Party of the Soviet Union. In addition, the 12-man Presidium of the CPSU was renamed the Politburo, and its roster changed to 11 members. The last of the "old Bolsheviks" in the Kremlin hierarchy, 70-year-old Anastas Mikoyan and 78-year-old Nikolai Shvernik, were allowed to retire. Shvernik was replaced by newcomer Arvids Pelshe. The other ten members of the Politburo were Brezhnev, Prime Minister Alexei Kosygin, party ideologist Mikhail Suslov, Russian Federation premier Gennady Voronov, Russian first deputy premiers Kiril Mazurov and Dmitry Polyansky, and Ukraine Party First Secretary Pyotr Shelest.
- The last poll tax in the United States was outlawed when a three-judge panel of the Fifth U.S. Circuit Court of Appeals voided the requirement in Mississippi, in accordance with the U.S. Supreme Court's ruling in Harper v. Virginia State Board of Elections. Since 1890, a registered voter had to present receipts showing payment of the poll tax for the two preceding Januarys before being allowed to cast a vote in a Mississippi election. Ostensibly, the law had been justified as a fundraiser for the "common school fund", but the poll tax accounted for only 0.43% of Mississippi's education revenues. As a practical matter, the poll tax was a deterrent to participation by low income Southerners, and most African-Americans. Earlier in the year, similar decisions had outlawed the taxes in Texas, Alabama and Virginia.
- All 494 people on board the Norwegian cruise ship Viking Princess were saved from a fire that swept through the luxury ocean liner while it was sailing in the Caribbean Sea between Aruba and Curaçao, although three of the passengers died of heart attacks during their escape. "It's funny the way the passengers all stuck together," a passenger would later say, "It was a very peculiar thing. No shouting or screaming." The ship's captain, Otto Thoresen, said that it took the passengers only ten minutes to enter lifeboats after the 'abandon ship' order was given. At the time, the closest ship, the German vessel Cap Norte, was still 90 minutes away.
- Two boys, aged 13 and 12, who ran away from their homes in Fayetteville, North Carolina, sneaked on to a railroad box car and then found themselves locked inside for the next 13 days. The sealed car was carrying a cargo of nearly empty beer bottles to the Schlitz Brewing Company in Milwaukee, Wisconsin, and for nearly two weeks, they survived by drinking small amounts of stale beer, until April 21, when they arrived in Milwaukee and workmen at the brewing company heard their cries for help.
- The terrorist group Fatah caused its first death in Israel when an Israeli farmer was killed by a land mine that had been placed by members who had sneaked across the border with Syria. After more mine casualties, Israel would launch air strikes against Syria and, in June 1967, would make the first strike against its Arab neighbors in the Six-Day War.
- NASA launched its first Orbiting Astronomical Observatory, OAO-1, with detection instruments that would measure stellar ultraviolet radiation without the interference that ground-based telescopes faced on Earth. The spacecraft's batteries would be depleted two days after the launch, after a high-voltage arc when powering up the trackers.
- The Norwegian cargo ship Stavfjord collided with the Cuban ship Oriente 16 nautical miles (30 km) north of Ameland, Netherlands. Both ships sank, but all crew were rescued by the Dutch ship Luden.
- In one of the most controversial covers of Time magazine, the national newsweekly's cover for Good Friday, 1966, had a black background and, in bold red letters, the question "Is God Dead?"
- Born: Robin Wright, American actress; in Dallas

== April 9, 1966 (Saturday) ==
- United Nations Security Council Resolution 221 was adopted by a 10 to 0 vote, with five abstentions, and authorized the United Kingdom to use military force to enforce a U.N. embargo against Southern Rhodesia. Two permanent members, the Soviet Union and France, abstained, but did not veto the British-sponsored resolution. The vote authorized the Royal Navy to halt the Greek oil tanker Joanna V, already at anchor outside the Portuguese Mozambique port of Beira, from going any further and unloading its petroleum cargo for delivery through a pipeline to Rhodesia, and to stop the incoming ship Manuela from sailing into Beira.
- Spain temporarily lifted the censorship of newspapers that had been in effect since the end of the Spanish Civil War in 1936, and restored freedom of the press. The new liberties would be short-lived and would be rescinded in a decree on January 24, 1969.
- Nell Theobald, an American model who appeared in advertisements to promote various products, was injured on the job while posing with a lion named Ludwig as part of a photo shoot for BMW automobiles. Although Ludwig co-operated with the taking of multiple pictures during the International Automobile Show at the New York Coliseum, the lion bit Ms. Theobald on the left thigh when photography was over. The model required surgery to prevent her leg from being amputated, and would later receive a $250,000 settlement from a lawsuit against multiple defendants.
- John H. Disher, NASA's Saturn/Apollo Applications Deputy Director, asked the Marshall Space Flight Center (MSFC) to prepare cost and schedule estimates for integration of the Apollo Telescope Mount (ATM) with the Apollo Lunar Module (LEM).
- Born:
  - Thomas Doll, German soccer football midfielder who played for East Germany's national team and later for the team of reunified Germany; in Malchin, East Germany
  - Cynthia Nixon, American TV and stage actress, winner of two Emmy Awards, two Tony Awards and a Grammy Award; in New York City
- Died:
  - Sutan Sjahrir, 56, Indonesia independence leader and that nation's first Prime Minister; following a stroke
  - Barry Butler, 31, English footballer; in a car accident

== April 10, 1966 (Sunday) ==
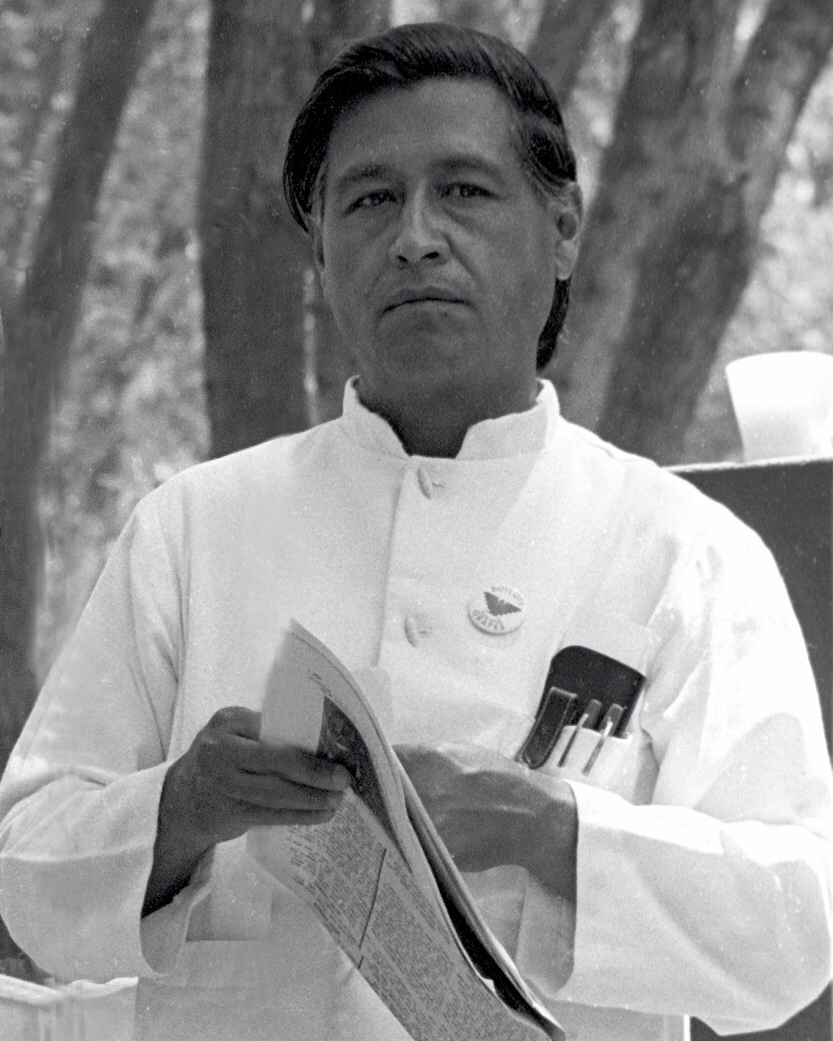
Cesar Chavez

- The march of grape farm workers from Delano, California came to a conclusion after 250 miles and 25 days as the original group of 65 was joined by thousands of supporters at the State Capitol building in Sacramento, where union leader Cesar Chavez announced the successful negotiation of a favorable contract between the National Farm Workers Association and Schenley Industries.
- The Central Committee of the Chinese Communist Party approved a directive that disapproved of almost all of the literary and artistic works that had been created since the 1949 founding of the People's Republic, on the ground that they reflected an "anti-party and anti-socialist black line... that combines bourgeois literary theory and modern revisionist literary theory" that was contrary to the thought of Chairman Mao. The ruling, sent out nationwide, made criminal suspects of China's artists and writers during the Cultural Revolution.
- The Royal Navy, acting under the authorization of the Security Council, boarded the oil tanker Manuela and directed it not to continue toward Beira. Over the next two years, the Navy would stop 29 more ships in order to prevent Rhodesia from getting oil through its pipeline from Mozambique.
- New Jersey became the first U.S. state to create a Public Defender's Office to pay for free criminal defense for anyone charged with a crime and unable to afford a private attorney.
- Died: Evelyn Waugh (Arthur Evelyn St. John Waugh), 62, British writer of novels, biographies and travel books

== April 11, 1966 (Monday) ==
- Sandoz Pharmaceuticals, the only licensed distributor in the United States of LSD discontinued all further American sales of the hallucinogenic drug. According to a spokesman, Sandoz had "released it only to highly qualified clinical investigators", but voluntarily quit due to "unforeseen public reaction".
- Emmett Ashford made his debut as the first African-American Major League Baseball umpire, appearing in Washington, D.C. at third base in the Washington Senators' season opening game against the Cleveland Indians. Cleveland won, 5–2, before a record Washington baseball crowd of 44,468.
- The conservative newsweekly U.S. News & World Report became the first American news magazine to analogize the Vietnam War as a "stalemate" with neither side likely to defeat the other. Newsweek would not use the term until December 19, and TIME not until June 30, 1967.
- The inaugural Singapore Grand Prix motor race was won by Lee Han Seng of Singapore. The race would be discontinued after 1973, but revived thirty-five years later in 2008.
- Born: Lisa Stansfield, English singer; in Manchester

== April 12, 1966 (Tuesday) ==
- For the first time, American B-52 planes bombed North Vietnam, after years of bombing runs by smaller planes. In the largest bombing mission by any nation since World War II, 29 B-52s dropped 585 tons of bombs on the Mụ Giạ Pass through the Annamese Mountain Range, in an attempt to break the supply line that was nicknamed the "Ho Chi Minh trail". Although the objective was to create landslides that would close off the pass completely, a reconnaissance mission the next day found that the Viet Cong guerillas had cleared the area, filled the craters in the road, and were driving their trucks through the pass once more. After a second wave of intensive bombings and an equally intensive clearing of the pass, a CIA appraisal would later note that the "Communists will spare no effort to keep it open".
- Singer Jan Berry of the rock music duo Jan & Dean was seriously injured when he lost control of his Corvette automobile and crashed into a parked truck on Sunset Boulevard in Beverly Hills, California, near (but not at) the slight turn on the Boulevard that was the inspiration for the group's 1963 hit song, "Dead Man's Curve". Berry was in a coma for two months and would undergo years of rehabilitation after awakening.
- The trial of Egyptian dissident Sayyid Qutb began in Cairo, after his indictment on charges of conspiring to overthrow the government of President Gamal Abdel Nasser of the United Arab Republic. Qutb and two of his accused co-conspirators would be convicted and hanged on August 29.
- The first reported instance of a flag burning in the course of protests against the Vietnam War took place in a theater in New York City, where an antiwar skit entitled LBJ was being performed.
- U.S. President Johnson told France's President de Gaulle that the United States would not comply with his ultimatum to remove all American troops before April 1, 1967.
- The Japan Art Theater Guild released Patriotism, a short film written, produced and directed by Yukio Mishima, based on his 1960 short story of the same name.
- Died:
  - Chris Soumokil, 60, South Moluccan separatist leader who fought against the government of Indonesia, was executed in an Indonesian prison. On April 25, 1950, he had proclaimed the "Republic of South Maluku" on several of the islands that made up the South Moluccas and named himself President, but had been arrested in 1963.
  - Sir Waithilingam Duraiswamy, 91, Ceylonese lawyer, politician and speaker of the State Council of Ceylon

== April 13, 1966 (Wednesday) ==
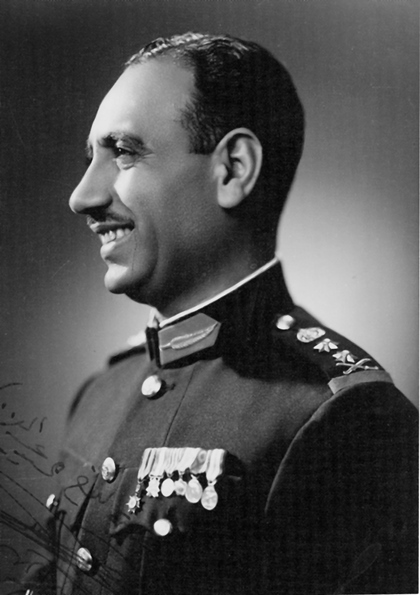
President Arif

- Field Marshal Abdul Salam Arif, the 45-year-old President of Iraq, was killed in a helicopter crash, along with ten of his aides, after the aircraft failed during a sandstorm after their takeoff from Al-Qurnah in southern Iraq, north of the port of Basra. The dead included Interior Minister Abdul Latif Daraji and Minister of Industry Mustafa Abdullah, and the Basra district governor. Prime Minister Abdel Rahman Bazzaz became the Acting President, pending a selection of Marshal Arif's successor.
- One day after the Atlanta Braves played their first regular season baseball game since moving from Milwaukee (a 3–2 loss in Atlanta to the Pittsburgh Pirates), Milwaukee County, Wisconsin Circuit Court Judge Elmer W. Roller ordered the team to return to Milwaukee by May 18, unless the National League intended to grant Milwaukee an expansion franchise in 1967. Judge Roller also fined the league, the Braves, and the other nine NL teams $5,000 apiece for violating Wisconsin's antitrust laws. Major League Baseball Commissioner William D. Eckert announced that Judge Roller's decision would be appealed to the Wisconsin Supreme Court. The state Supreme Court would reverse Judge Roller's ruling in August.
- U.S. President Lyndon Johnson signed the 1966 Uniform Time Act, setting a common date (the last Sunday in April) for all states in the U.S. to set their clocks forward one hour, beginning on April 29, 1967, and to set clocks forward one hour on the last Sunday in October, starting in 1967. At the time, 18 states observed daylight saving time (DST), 14 switched time zones rather than changing their clocks, and the other 18 left the option up to their local governments. Before the Uniform Act was passed, the prescribed days for changing the clocks varied across the nation; in the state of Iowa alone, there were 23 different DST periods.
- William Olson, a 24-year-old American Peace Corps volunteer and teacher from Spencer, New York, was eaten by a crocodile while he and five other Corps members were swimming in the Baro River at Gambela, Ethiopia. Olson, whose remains were recovered only after the crocodile was killed and opened up, was the first Corps volunteer to die in Ethiopia, and the first to be killed by an animal.
- Died:
  - Felix von Luckner, 84, German naval officer known during World War I as "the Sea-Devil" (Der Seeteufel). During the war, he commanded his sea raider SMS Seeadler (literally "Sea Eagle") in the capture of 16 merchant ships, with a minimum loss of enemy lives.
  - Georges Duhamel, 81, French novelist
  - Carlo Carrà, 85, Italian Futurist painter

== April 14, 1966 (Thursday) ==
108.7-acre nation with 566 citizens

- Vatican City released the results of its 1966 census and announced that the 108.7 acres (44.0 ha) nation had a population of 890 people inside its walls, of whom 566 were Vatican citizens. Of those 566 people, 60 were priests, 124 were other members of the clergy, 220 were members of the Swiss Guard, and 162 were civilian employees and their families.
- The three convicted assassins of Malcolm X were each sentenced to life in prison, after having been found guilty of murdering the Black Nationalist leader at the Audubon Ballroom in New York City on February 21, 1965. "Norman 3X" Butler (later Muhammad Abdul Aziz), "Thomas 15X" Johnson (later Khalil Islam) and Thomas Hagan (aka Talmadge Hayer), all members of the Black Muslim's Nation of Islam movement, had been found guilty on March 11. Johnson had been the first to fire, cutting down Malcolm X with two blasts from a shotgun, and Hagan and Butler then completed the execution with their pistols. Butler and Johnson would be paroled in 1985 and 1987, respectively, while Hagan would be released from prison after 44 years in 2010.
- Lieutenant General Nguyen Van Thieu, Head of State and Chairman of the military junta that ruled South Vietnam, signed a decree promising that free national elections for a civilian government would take place by September 15.
- NASA Administrator James E. Webb said at a press conference that the Apollo Applications Program would be hampered without additional funding in the Fiscal Year 1968 budget. Efforts to obtain funding for post-Apollo projects had been hindered by rising costs of the Vietnam War and congressional discontent with NASA's increasing administrative costs.
- Born:
  - Greg Maddux, American Baseball Hall of Fame pitcher; in San Angelo, Texas
  - David Justice, American major league baseball player; in Cincinnati

== April 15, 1966 (Friday) ==
- A mob of 2,000 Indonesian Chinese protesters attacked the Embassy of the People's Republic of China in Jakarta, smashing windows and doors, throwing documents into bonfires, and tearing down the PRC flag. The protesters, Indonesian citizens with Chinese ancestry, made the attack after a two-hour rally in which they pledged their loyalty to Indonesia.
- An American military spokesman reported that there had been 1,361 U.S. servicemen killed in the Vietnam War in 1966 as of April 9, already more than the 1,342 that had died during the entire year of 1965. By April, according to the press release, the combat death rate for U.S. Army, Marine, Navy and Air Force personnel had was now averaging 100 people per week.
- Uganda's Prime Minister Milton Obote declared himself to be the President of Uganda under the newly approved constitution of that African nation. The office had been vacant since March 2, when Dr. Obote sent the ceremonial President, Sir Edward Mutesa, into exile.
- NASA's George E. Mueller declined to accept a Lockheed Corporation proposal to launch space probes from orbiting space stations in space, as well as a proposal to eventually launch vehicles from orbit. MSC Director Robert R. Gilruth summarized his conference with Mueller and voiced his concern that "the future of manned space flight... is in jeopardy because we do not have firm goals, and because the present approach appears to us to be technically unsound."
- Born:
  - Chai Ling, Chinese women's rights activist who guided the Tiananmen Square protests of 1989 while she was a student at Beijing University; in Rizhao, Shandong
  - Cressida Cowell, British children's author, known for her How to Train Your Dragon book series; in London

== April 16, 1966 (Saturday) ==
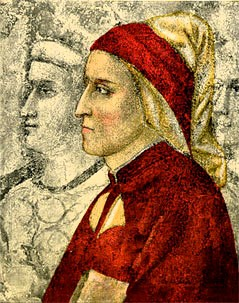
Dante Alighieri, 1265–1321

- Italian poet Dante Alighieri was cleared of charges of conspiracy against the city of Florence, and of corruption in public office, following an eight-hour hearing convened in Arezzo by a court headed by former Court of Cassations President Ernesto Eula, and that included former Prime Minister Giovanni Leone. Dante had been sentenced to death in both 1303 and 1315 after trials in Florence, but was subsequently exiled and had died on September 13, 1321. The hearing was the last event in a series of celebrations of the 700th anniversary of Dante's birth.

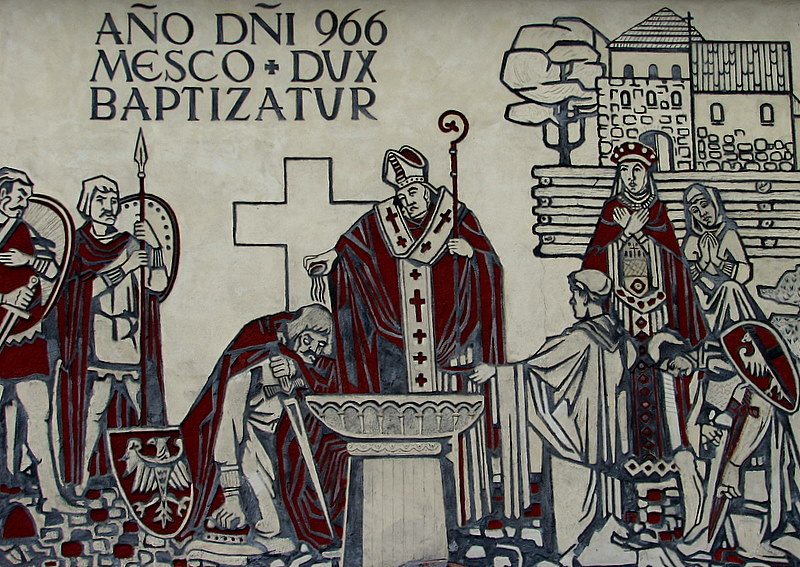
Baptism of Mieszko in 966

- The millennium of the founding of the nation of Poland, and the 1,000th anniversary of the date that its rulers first endorsed the Christian faith, was celebrated by both church and state in separate ceremonies at the city of Gniezno. Poland's first ruler, Mieszko the First, had received Christian baptism on Easter Sunday, April 15, 966, at the age of 26. Church ceremonies at St. Adalbert's Cathedral ended in time for Communist Party leaders to assemble at the town square for public addresses.
- After 83 years at West 39th Street and Broadway, New York City's original Metropolitan Opera House conducted its final performance before closing its doors. A standing-room-only crowd watched a five-hour performance of operatic arias by 60 different singers at "The Met". To introduce the program, the Met's general manager, Sir Rudolf Bing, summed up the move to the new location at the Lincoln Center on West 63rd Street, saying "The company goes on and will do all we can to deserve your continued support. The queen is dead. Long live the queen!"
- Chinese intellectual, poet and journalist Deng Tuo was publicly chastised by the government newspaper Beijing Daily, which revealed that he had written literary and political works that were now judged as counterrevolutionary, and listed the various pen names that he had used. More denunciations followed and on May 17, he committed suicide.
- Died: Nandalal Bose, 83, Indian painter

== April 17, 1966 (Sunday) ==
- In one of the better known unidentified flying object (UFO) cases of the decade, two deputies with the Sheriff's office of Portage County, Ohio, Dale Spaur and W. L. Neff, were investigating a traffic accident at 5:00 a.m., when they were alerted by the dispatcher that there was an unknown object heading toward their vicinity. Spaur, a U.S. Air Force pilot during the Korean War, would say later that he saw a circular object that he estimated at 30 feet (9.1 m) in diameter, 1,000 feet (300 m) off the ground. He and Neff then followed it for 85 miles (137 km) from Atwater, Ohio, being joined by other lawmen as they crossed into Pennsylvania, before losing track of it at the town of Freedom. On the same morning, police in Benton Harbor, Michigan, received reports about UFO sightings as well. Spaur would lose his job and his marriage, and he and the others involved in the chase would be ridiculed by the public.
- Ian Smith, the Prime Minister of Rhodesia, announced that his nation was severing the last of its ties to the United Kingdom, closing the British mission in the capital at Salisbury, Rhodesia (now Harare, Zimbabwe) and removing the last of its staffers at the former High Commissioner's office at the Rhodesia House.
- Major General Abdul Rahman Arif was sworn in as the new President of Iraq, three days after the death of his younger brother and predecessor in office, Abdul Salam Arif. He would remain in office for two years, before being overthrown by Ahmed Hassan al-Bakr on July 17, 1968.
- Wrotham transmitting station in Kent, England, became the first BBC transmitter to broadcast in stereo.

== April 18, 1966 (Monday) ==
- The Cultural Revolution was officially proclaimed in the People's Republic of China, with the publication of the government announcement that gave the name that would define the era of upheaval. The official People's Liberation Army daily newspaper, Jiefangjun Bao, published a front-page editorial with the title "Hold High the Great Red Banner of Mao Tse-tung's Thought, and Actively Participate in the Great Socialist Cultural Revolution".
- The first official sporting event ever played on AstroTurf, the original artificial turf made to resemble grass, took place at the Houston Astrodome in Texas. Originally, the turf was installed only in the infield. Astros outfielder Jimmy Wynn would later comment, "You could already feel the difference in how quickly the ball moved when it took its first good roll or hard bounce off that surface. It occurred to me that big changes were coming." The visiting Los Angeles Dodgers defeated the Houston Astros in that game, 6–3. The Dodgers and the Astros had previously been the first to test the turf in a preseason exhibition game on March 19.
- Bill Russell became the first African-American head coach in the National Basketball Association (NBA), when the Boston Celtics named him to the helm at the end of the regular season. Russell, who would continue to play for the Celtics even while coaching them, was named after Red Auerbach decided to retire from coaching in order to spend full-time as the Celtics' general manager.
- As a counter to France's announcement that it would withdraw from NATO on July 1, West Germany's Foreign Minister Gerhard Schroeder informed his French counterpart, Maurice Couve de Murville, that the 75,000 French troops in West Germany would either have to be placed under German authority or withdrawn.
- The Sound of Music, which had already broken the record for highest grossing motion picture, earned five Oscars out of ten nominations, including the award for Best Picture, at the 38th Academy Awards.
- The government of India declared the new Paradip Port to be the nation's eighth major port. Located in the state of Odisha, Paradip was also the first major port on India's east coast.

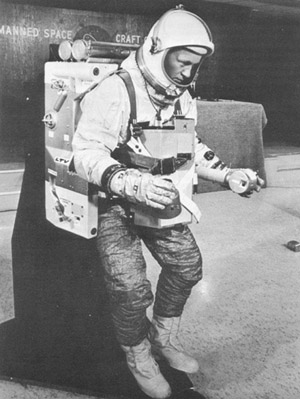
Demonstration of Astronaut Maneuvering Unit

- Tests began on the extravehicular life support system (ELSS) for installation on Gemini spacecraft No. 9, and the unit was installed on May 2.

== April 19, 1966 (Tuesday) ==
- Roberta Gibb of San Diego became the first woman to run in the Boston Marathon, though unofficially, because the foot race was officially limited to men at the time. Gibb had applied to the Boston Athletic Association in 1965 to run for that year's Marathon, and was rejected with a letter explaining that it was "not physiologically possible for a woman" to run the distance of more than 26 miles. On the day of the 1966 race, Gibb dressed in a hooded sweatshirt and sweatpants, hid near the starting line, then jumped in with the other runners as the race began in Hopkinton. Unofficially, Gibb (whose married name was Mrs. Roberta Bingay) finished in 124th place in the field of more than 500 contestants, completing the course in 3 hours, 21 minutes and 25 seconds. Winning the laurels in first place was Kenji Kimihara, who, as with the finishers in second (Seiichiro Sasaki), third (Toru Terasawa) and fourth place (Hikokoaru Okabe) was from Japan.
- Ian Brady and Myra Hindley went on trial at Chester Crown Court, before Mr Justice Fenton Atkinson, for the murders of three children who had vanished between November 1963 and October 1965. They would be convicted two weeks later.
- Died:
  - Javier Solís, 34, Mexican singer of ranchera & bolero music; from complications following routine gallbladder surgery
  - Väinö Tanner, 85, Prime Minister of Finland (1926–27)

== April 20, 1966 (Wednesday) ==
- President Liu Shaoqi of China first came under criticism from the Red Guards, the group of students who carried out the call from Chairman Mao Zedong to identify national enemies as part of the Cultural Revolution. President Liu was accused of being a capitalist and a member of the "bourgeois and feudal remnants" of pre-revolutionary China. As a scapegoat for China's problems, Liu would be fired, arrested and tortured before his death in 1969.
- Sixty people were killed and 122 injured when a terrorist bomb exploded on a passenger train at a railroad station in Lumding, in the Assam State in northeastern India. The Indian government attributed the blast to Naga separatists. Only three days later, another bomb attack, this time in the Assamese town of Diphu, would kill 29 people.
- Born:
  - David Filo, American billionaire, computer entrepreneur and co-founder (with Jerry Yang) of Yahoo!; in Madison, Wisconsin
  - Vincent Riendeau, Canadian ice hockey player; in Saint-Hyacinthe, Quebec

== April 21, 1966 (Thursday) ==
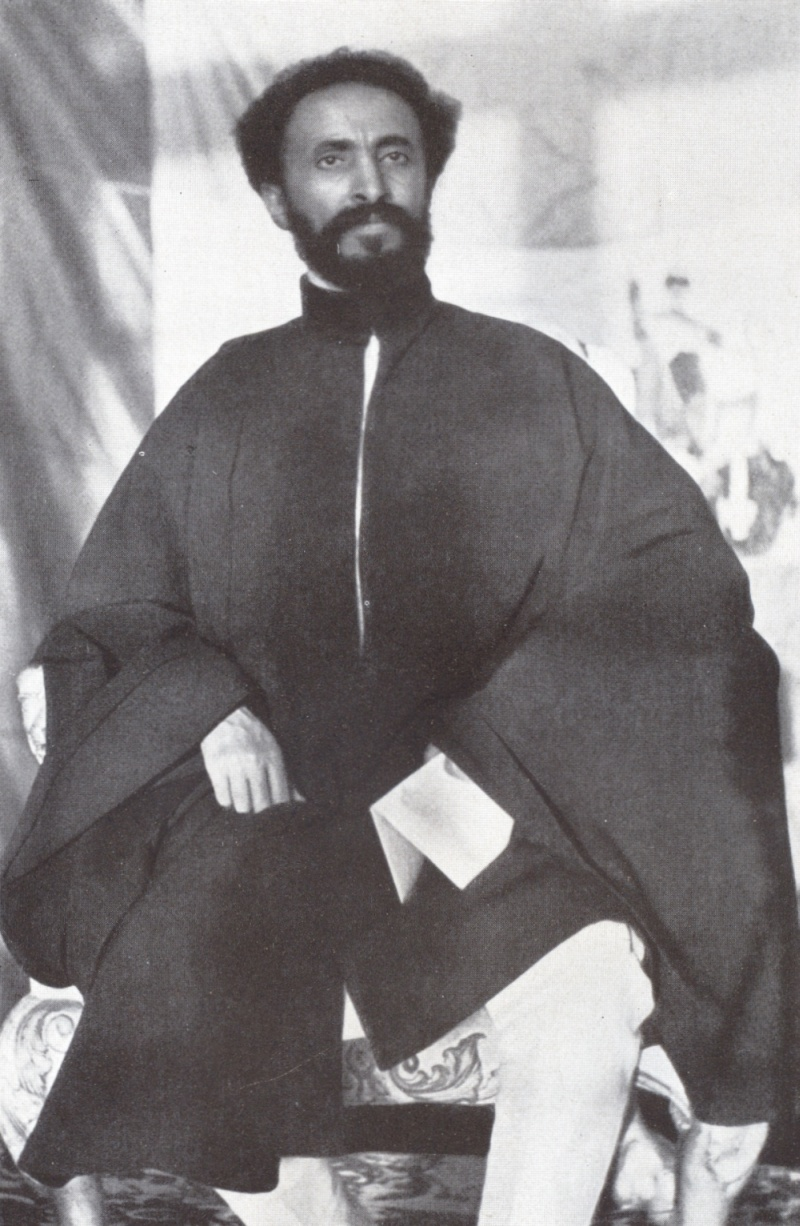
Ras Tafari, Emperor Haile Selassie

- Ethiopia's Emperor Haile Selassie, known before his ascent to the throne as Ras Tafari Makonnen, and a Messianic figure among thousands of adherents to the Rastafarian religion, arrived in Jamaica, 30 after Rastafari took root, where he was greeted at the Palisadoes Airport in Kingston by more than 100,000 people. The anniversary of his visit is still celebrated as "Grounation Day", a holy day in the Rastafarian religion.
- For the first time, an artificial heart was installed in a human being, as Dr. Michael DeBakey and a team of surgeons from Baylor University implanted the device into coal miner Marcel DeRudder in order to keep him alive. The six-hour surgery took place at the Methodist Hospital in Houston. Five days later, DeRudder, a resident of Westville, Illinois, would die from a ruptured lung.
- The opening of the Parliament of the United Kingdom was televised for the first time.
- MSC Director Robert R. Gilruth designated Deputy Director George M. Low as the principal contact for all matters pertaining to the Apollo Applications Program.
- Died: Sepp Dietrich, 73, convicted Nazi German war criminal and general who commanded various armored divisions during World War II

== April 22, 1966 (Friday) ==
- The crash of American Flyers Flight 280 killed 81 of the 98 people aboard. The Lockheed Electra turboprop airplane was carrying 92 U.S. Army soldiers and a crew of six on the way back from training camp, and impacted into the foothills of the Arbuckle Mountains, 2 miles (3.2 km) from the airport at Ardmore, Oklahoma, where it was stopping for refueling. The flight had been en route from Fort Ord, California, to Fort Benning, Georgia.
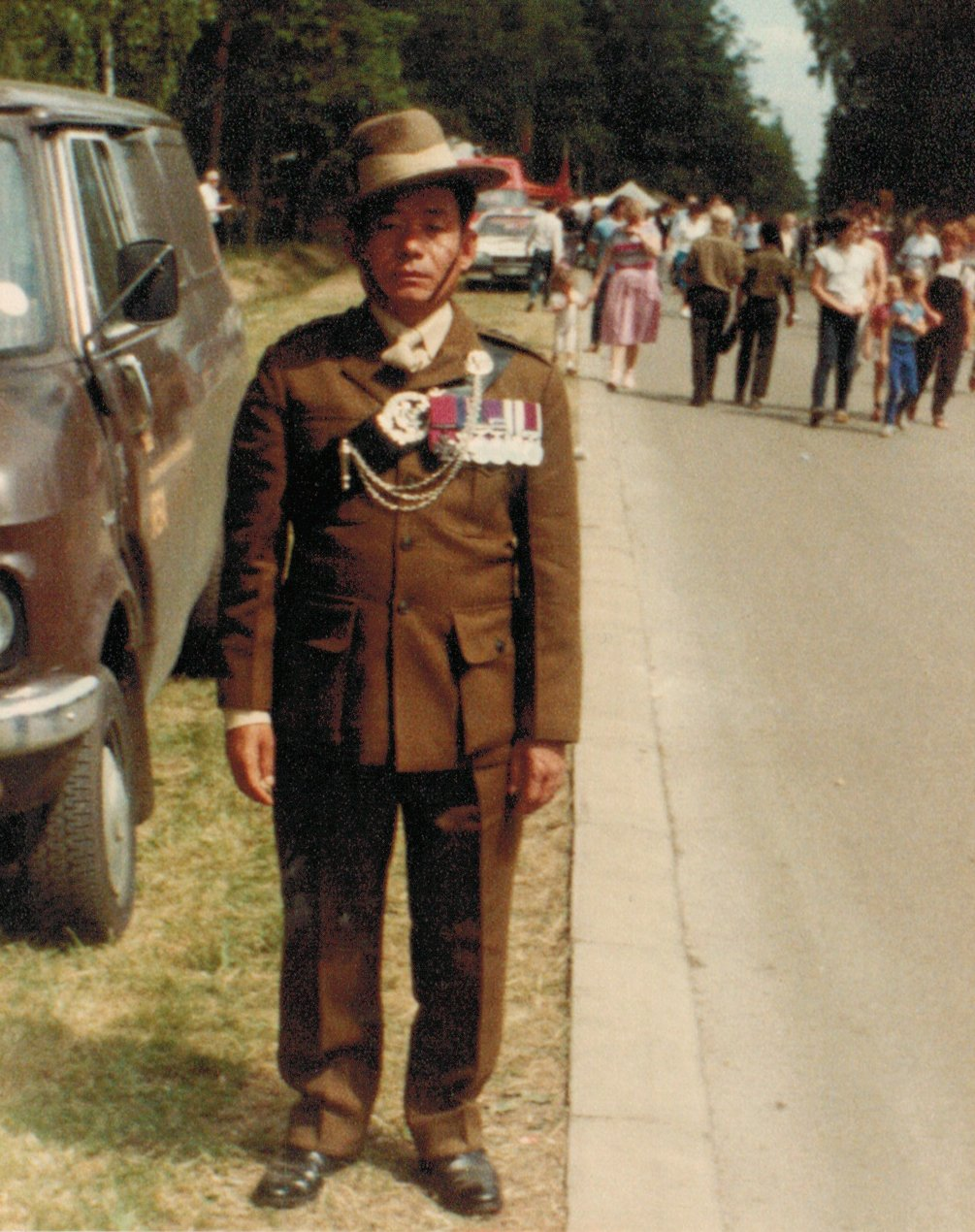
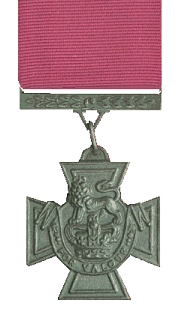
Rambahadur and Victoria Cross
- Gurkha Lance-Corporal Rambahadur Limbu, a native of Nepal serving with the 10th Gurkha Rifles of the British Army, was awarded the Victoria Cross for his heroism at Sarawak on November 21, 1965. It was the first time in more than 12 years that the Victoria Cross, emblematic of outstanding bravery and selfless conduct, had been awarded.
- NASA Deputy Director Robert C. Seamans, Jr., postponed the competition for the development of the Apollo Telescope Mount (ATM) until the AAP funding picture for the next two fiscal years became clearer, but assigned the sole source award to Ball Brothers Research Corporation to study adapting the use of the ATM beyond the basic 14-day mission, as well as a study to adapt the mount to the Apollo lunar module (LM) for extended operations.
- Gemini Program Manager Charles W. Mathews reported the launch dates tentatively scheduled for Gemini 10 as July 18, 1966 for Gemini 11 as September 7, and for Gemini 12 as October 31. Each of the three flights were launched within days after their projected liftoff, on July 18, September 12 and November 11.

== April 23, 1966 (Saturday) ==
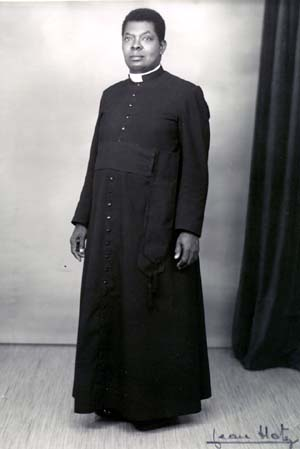
The cassock

- The cassock, a long black, multi-buttoned garment that had served as the standard uniform for Latin Catholic clergy in Italy, Spain and Poland for centuries, was no longer required to be worn at all times, as the dress code was eased by the Church. Under new rules, priests were allowed to wear "modern" suits (jacket and pants) with the clerical collar, though not while in Rome, or when performing religious duties or teaching religion in schools.
- Aerial combat in the Vietnam War entered a new phase as the North Vietnamese Air Force sent its first MiG-21 to fight against U.S. Air Force bombers. Two B-66 Destroyers were being escorted to their mission by a flight of F-4 Phantoms when the MiG-21, faster and better armed than previous North Vietnamese jets, came in behind them. Despite attempts by one of the F-4s to shoot down the MiG-21, neither side struck the other during the first mission.
- The crash of Aeroflot Flight 2723 into the Soviet Union's Caspian Sea killed all 33 people on board. The Ilyushin Il-14 had originated in Baku in the Azerbaijani SSR and toward a stopover in Makhachkala in the Russian SFSR, but suffered engine problems 12 minutes after takeoff and was attempting to return to Baku when it fell into the Caspian and sank. The wreckage was not discovered until several months later.
- The New York Herald Tribune and a more recent product of merger, the New York World-Telegram and Sun both published their final issues. That evening, negotiations between the Newspaper Guild of New York and the Publishers Association of New York City failed and the newspaper employees walked out on strike, postponing plans for their merged company, World Journal Tribune, Inc., to publish.
- Died: George Ohsawa (born Nyoichi Sakurazawa), 72, Japanese founder of the philosophy of the macrobiotic diet

== April 24, 1966 (Sunday) ==
- A "mini-census" was conducted across the United Kingdom in Great Britain and Northern Ireland, using a ten percent sample. The detailed results, however, were ordered sealed for a century and are not scheduled to be released until January 1, 2067.
- The 1966 United States Road Racing Championship season began, with the Stardust Grand Prix at Las Vegas, Nevada. The opening race was won by Canada's John Cannon.
- Pascal Lissouba resigned as Prime Minister of Congo (Brazzaville) and was replaced by Ambroise Noumazalaye.
- Died:
  - George Humphrey, 76, English psychologist who, in 1923, published one of the first popular books about experimental psychology, The Story of Man's Mind.
  - Louis A. Johnson, 75, U.S. Secretary of Defense who was fired by President Harry Truman after the Korean War began.
  - Vyacheslav Oltarzhevsky, 86, Soviet skyscraper architect

== April 25, 1966 (Monday) ==
- The Kelud volcano in Indonesia, in East Java, erupted, sending lava and hot ash over into the surrounding area. According to the Indonesian news agency Antara, the village of Bambunan was destroyed along with much of another nearby hamlet, Margomuijo. The final death toll for three days of eruptions, including a larger blast on April 27, was 175 people, with another 60 missing. The final toll, after the cessation of the eruption on May 7, would be 215.
- Eleven schoolchildren, mostly 7 and 8 years old, were killed by a drunken driver in Belgium in the town of Waregem-Asse while their teacher was giving them a lesson on how to safely cross the street. The children had been standing on a sidewalk when a bakery truck skidded on to the curb after coming around a curve. The driver, 43 year old Emile Tibeout, was later charged with manslaughter.
- TASS, the official Soviet news agency, reported that Asmar Salakhova of the Armenian SSR was the oldest woman in the world at the supposed age of 153 years old. Mrs. Salkhova claimed that she had been born in 1812, that she had been forced to go into exile at the age of 65 after an invasion in 1877, and that after 62 years away, when she was 137, "her dream came true" of returning home in 1949.
- The first edition of the British newspaper Morning Star (formerly the Daily Worker) was issued.
- Died: Maria Nikolaevna Kuznetsova, 85, Russian/Soviet opera singer and dancer

== April 26, 1966 (Tuesday) ==
- An attempt to assassinate the Sultan of Oman, Said bin Taimur, failed while the monarch was inspecting troops at the 'Ain Razat Army Camp near Salalah. The commander of a nine-man ceremonial guard, Staff Sergeant Sa'id Suhayl Qatn, and another guard, two other guards, raised their rifles during a salute, and then took aim at the Sultan himself, but "missed him by a considerable distance". Both mutineers had secretly been working with the Dhofar Liberation Front. The Sultan would order a blockade of Dhofar mountains, and the erection of a fence around the city of Salalah, effectively imprisoning the people there by barring entry or exit from the town. Becoming increasingly paranoid, he would withdraw from all further public appearances, and would eventually be deposed in 1970 by his son, Qaboos bin Said al Said.
- At their meeting in Rome, the International Olympic Committee voted for the site of 1972's Summer and Winter Olympic games. There were four candidates for the 1972 Summer Olympics, from West Germany (Munich), Spain (Madrid), Canada (Montreal) and the United States (Detroit), with none getting a majority of the 61 votes on the first ballot. On the second vote, Munich got 31, Madrid 15, Montreal 14 and Detroit (which had 6 votes the first time) zero. Sapporo, Japan was awarded the 1972 Winter Olympics on the first ballot, receiving 32 votes, with the entry from Canada (Banff, Alberta) getting 16, and Lahti (Finland) and the American candidate (Salt Lake City, Utah) receiving seven apiece.
- In Amravati, India, 32 employees of a cottonseed oil mill were killed and 26 others seriously injured in an explosion.
- Born: Natasha Trethewey, American poet; in Gulfport, Mississippi

== April 27, 1966 (Wednesday) ==
- A 17-year-old American girl sneaked aboard the British submarine HMS Walrus (S08) while it was docked at Baltimore. A runaway, she was discovered after the sub was four hours out to sea, saying that she had wanted to go to England, and the Walrus returned to the United States. The Royal Navy attaché to the U.S., Captain Douglas Scobe, told reporters later, "Taking one of their citizens is rather overextending our appreciation of their hospitality in Baltimore."
- LANSA Flight 501 crashed into the side of Mount Talaula in Peru while on a flight from Lima to Cuzco, killing all 43 passengers and six crew. Subsequent investigation concluded that the pilot of the Lockheed Constellation airplane, operated by Líneas Aéreas Nacionales S. A. (LANSA), misjudged the height of the mountains, resulting in an impact while at an altitude of 12,600 feet (3,800 m).
- In the first meeting between the leader of the Roman Catholic Church and a governmental minister from any Communist nation, Pope Paul VI received Soviet Foreign Minister Andrei Gromyko in a private audience at the Vatican.
- Born:
  - Yoshihiro Togashi, Japanese manga artist known for writing and illustrating the YuYu Hakusho and Hunter × Hunter series; in Shinjō, Yamagata, Japan
  - Matt Reeves, American filmmaker and showrunner, in Rockville Center, New York

== April 28, 1966 (Thursday) ==
- In the Battle of Sinoia in Rhodesia (now Zimbabwe), the British South Africa Police killed seven ZANLA men in combat, escalating the second Chimurenga or Rhodesian Bush War. The force of 21 men, armed with AK-47 machine guns and grenades and calling itself "The Armageddon Group", had entered Rhodesia from Zambia, then split into three groups; another group of seven reached a white-owned farm and murdered a husband and wife, marking the first of the "white farm murders" in Rhodesia. The anniversary of the confrontation at Sinoia (now called Chinhoyi) is now celebrated as Chimurenga Day, marking the beginning of black liberation from the white minority government.
- American composer Douglas Moore's stage opera Carry Nation, about the temperance crusader Carrie Nation, was performed for the first time in Lawrence, Kansas as part of the centennial celebration of the founding of the University of Kansas. It would be presented by the New York City Opera on March 28, 1968.
- A high tension wire electrocuted 19 sugar cane workers near the city of São Simão in Brazil, and injured 25 others, when the truck they were riding in made contact with the fallen line.
- The Boston Celtics won the championship of the National Basketball Association in Game 7 of the best-of-7 NBA Finals, defeating the Los Angeles Lakers, 95–93, holding off the Lakers' bid to overcome a 95–85 deficit in the last 90 seconds. The victory marked Boston's eighth consecutive NBA Championship, and the farewell game for coach Red Auerbach.
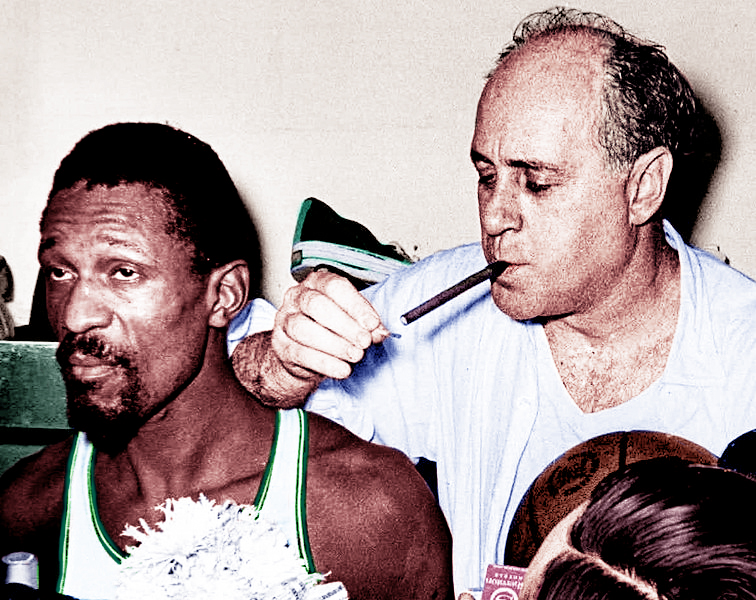
  Bill Russell and Red Auerbach after the championship
- Born:
  - Ali-Reza Pahlavi, titular prince of Iran and second in line for the abolished Pahlavi family monarchy at the time of his death; in Tehran (committed suicide, 2011)
  - John Daly, American professional golfer and 1991 PGA champion; in Carmichael, California
  - Too $hort (stage name for Todd Anthony Shaw), American hip hop artist; in Los Angeles

== April 29, 1966 (Friday) ==
- The total number of U.S. troops in South Vietnam reached 250,000 with one-quarter of a million Americans committed to the war there, as 4,000 members of the 25th U.S. Infantry Division came ashore at Vũng Tàu.

== April 30, 1966 (Saturday) ==
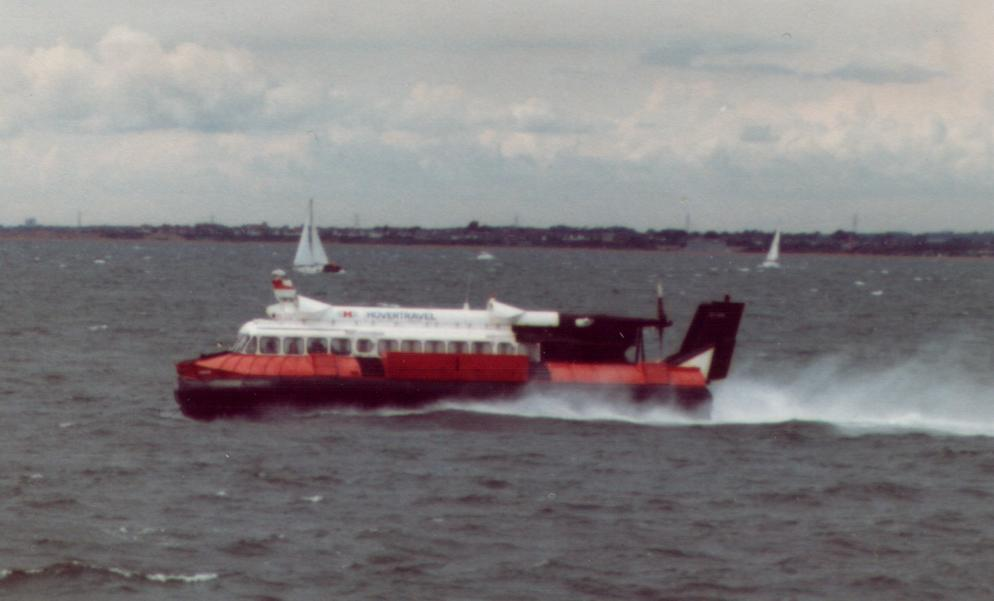
An SR.N6 hovercraft

- Regular hovercraft service began over the English Channel, between Ramsgate and Calais, with an SR.N6 transporting 36 passengers. It would be discontinued in 2000. The customers paid two pounds, two shillings (equivalent to $6.30) apiece for the journey.
- The first edition of bicycling's Amstel Gold Race took place in the Netherlands. The course, from Breda to Meerssen had been planned for 249 kilometres (155 mi), but because of several detours because of festivities on Queen's Day to honor Queen Beatrix, the race had been extended (officially) by more than 20% to 302 kilometres (188 mi). French former world champion cyclist Jean Stablinski won the inaugural classic.
- The body of Prince Frederick of Prussia, 54, fourth son of Crown Prince Wilhelm of Germany and grandson of Kaiser Wilhelm II, was found in the Rhine river near the town of Bingen am Rhein, two weeks after he went missing from his home in the West German village of Erbach.
- Anton LaVey of San Francisco founded the Church of Satan, declaring April 30 (the pagan holiday Walpurgisnacht) as the beginning of the first day of the first "Anno Satanas".
- Died:
  - Everett Case, 65, North Carolina State University basketball coach who would later be inducted into the Basketball Hall of Fame. In his will, Case bequeathed three-quarters of his estate to be divided among the 57 players whom he had coached over the years.
  - Richard Fariña, 29, American folk singer and novelist; in a motorcycle accident in Carmel Valley Village, California, after a book-signing party for his first novel.
