= Gert Thys =

South African long-distance runner

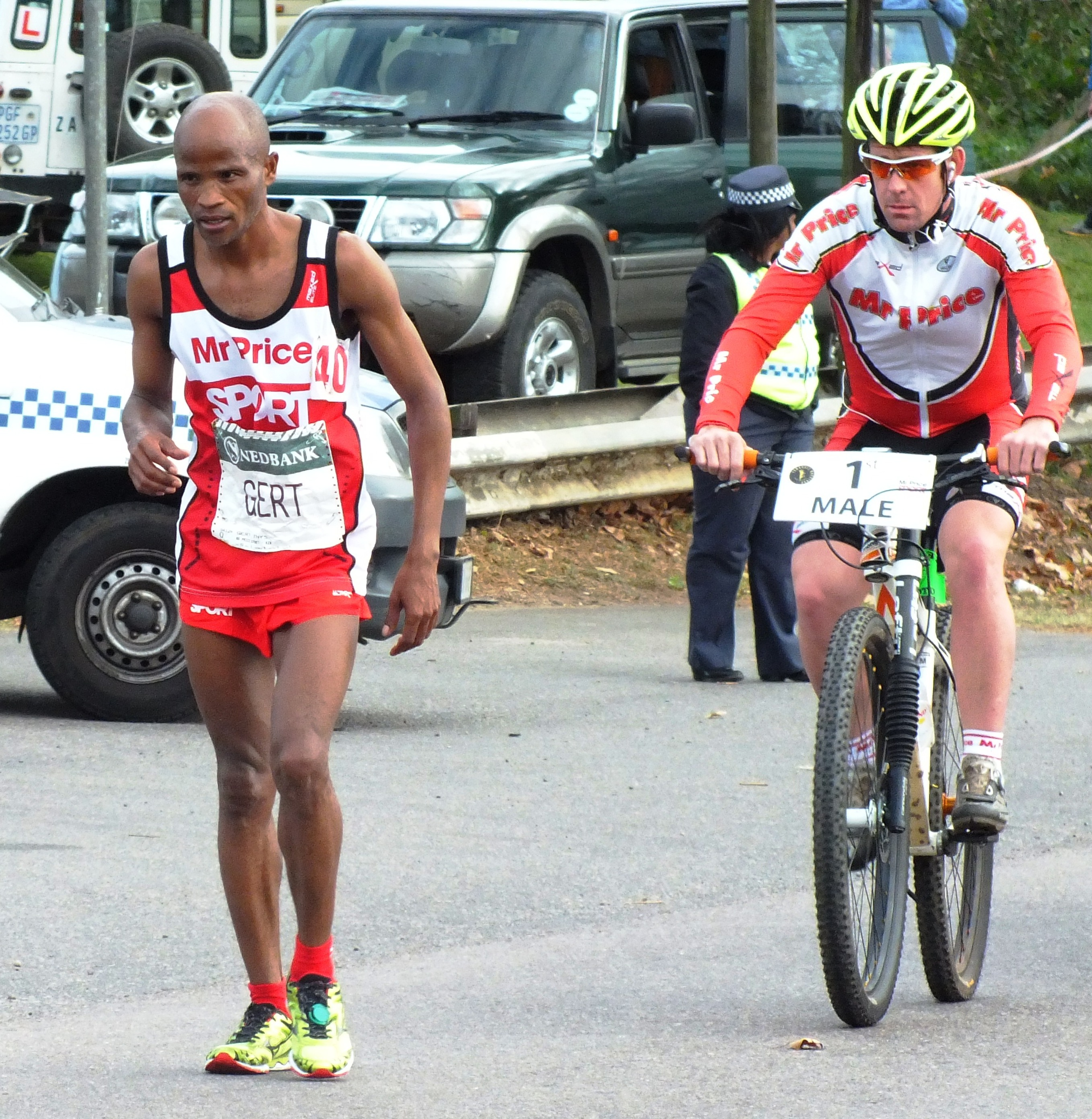
Gert Thys (left), 2012

Gert Thys (born 12 November 1971) is a male long-distance runner from South Africa, who represented his native country in the marathon at the 1996 and 2004 Summer Olympics. Thys is a former African record holder in the marathon, and is the current holder of the South African record with his best of 2:06:33 from the 1999 Tokyo International Marathon, which was also the course record for that race.

== Biography ==
Thys was born in Prieska, Northern Cape. He represented South Africa in the marathon at four consecutive editions of the World Championships in Athletics from 1999 to 2005. He has also competed at the IAAF World Half Marathon Championships on three occasions, highlighted by top six finishes in 1997 and 1998. Thys is a two-time winner of the Beppu-Ōita Marathon and his time of 2:08:30 set in 1996 was the course record until 2013. He was also a cross country runner earlier on in his career and was the 1994 winner of the Chiba International Cross Country.

He also had success in East Asia at the Seoul International Marathon, where he won three times between 2003 and 2006, as well as taking the runner-up spot in 2005. However, he was disqualified after his 2006 win because his doping test at the race was positive for the banned steroid norandrosterone. Thys contested the outcome and a protracted hearing following his competitive ban by Athletics South Africa eventually resulted in his exoneration. Laboratory errors in processing his sample meant the Court of Arbitration for Sport CAS found in his favour. In May 2010 the Federal Supreme Court of Switzerland overruled this decision, declaring that the CAS has no jurisdiction over this case. Thys successfully argued to the court that the fact that the same technician had analysed both his positive samples (a breach of the anti-doping rules) had meant that the validity of the tests could not stand. His doping ban was overturned on this basis in 2012 and he was re-instated as the winner of the 2006 Seoul Marathon.

His extensive running career, which began at the age of thirteen, has taken in around forty competitive marathons. He came close to victory at the 2010 Beijing Marathon, but he slowed in the final stages and was runner-up to Siraj Gena.

== Achievements ==
Year	Competition	Venue	Position	Event	Notes
Representing South Africa
1993	Lake Biwa Marathon	Ōtsu Japan	3rd	Marathon	2:11:40
1993	Fukuoka Marathon	Fukuoka, Japan	2nd	Marathon	2:09:31
1995	New York City Marathon	New York City, United States	11th	Marathon	2:13:28
1996	Olympic Games	Atlanta, United States	33rd	Marathon	2:18:55
1996	Beppu-Ōita Marathon	Beppu-Ōita, Japan	1st	Marathon	2:08:30
1996	Reims à Toutes Jambes	Reims, France	3rd	Marathon	2:11:13
1997	Beppu-Ōita Marathon	Beppu-Ōita, Japan	2nd	Marathon	2:13:14
1997	Gold Coast Marathon	Brisbane, Australia	2nd	Marathon	2:11:55
1998	Boston Marathon	Boston, United States	3rd	Marathon	2:07:52
1998	Chicago Marathon	Chicago, United States	3rd	Marathon	2:07:45
1999	Tokyo Marathon	Tokyo, Japan	1st	Marathon	2:06:33
1999	World Championships	Seville, Spain	15th	Marathon	2:17:13
2000	London Marathon	London, United Kingdom	12th	Marathon	2:11:32
2000	Fukuoka Marathon	Fukuoka, Japan	7th	Marathon	2:14:28
2001	London Marathon	London, United Kingdom	10th	Marathon	2:12:11
2001	World Championships	Edmonton, Canada	—	Marathon	DNF
2002	Seoul International Marathon	Seoul, South Korea	4th	Marathon	2:12:46
2002	New York City Marathon	New York City, United States	7th	Marathon	2:11:48
2003	Tokyo International Marathon	Tokyo, Japan	7th	Marathon	2:12:51
2003	Seoul International Marathon	Seoul, South Korea	1st	Marathon	2:08:42
2003	World Championships	Paris, France	30th	Marathon	2:15:00
2004	Seoul International Marathon	Seoul, South Korea	1st	Marathon	2:07:06
2004	Olympic Games	Athens, Greece	16th	Marathon	2:16:08
2004	Fukuoka Marathon	Fukuoka, Japan	4th	Marathon	2:14:27
2005	Seoul International Marathon	Seoul, South Korea	2nd	Marathon	2:11:19
2005	World Championships	Helsinki, Finland	—	Marathon	DNF
2006	Beppu-Ōita Marathon	Beppu-Ōita, Japan	1st	Marathon	2:09:45
2006	Seoul International Marathon	Seoul, South Korea	1st	Marathon	2:10:40
