= Shigeru So =

Japanese long-distance runner

Personal information
- Born: 9 January 1953 (age 73) Usuki, Ōita, Japan

Sport
- Country: Japan
- Sport: Athletics
- Event: Marathon

Achievements and titles
- Personal best: Marathon: 2:09:05 (Beppu-Ōita 1978)

Shigeru So (宗 茂, Sō Shigeru) (born 9 January 1953 in Usuki, Ōita) is a Japanese retired long-distance runner who represented his native country at two Summer Olympics: 1976 and 1984. He won the 1985 edition of the Tokyo Marathon. His twin brother Takeshi So is also a retired Olympic marathoner, and finished fourth in Los Angeles, California (1984). Both Shigeru So and his twin brother Takeshi So were known for attending training camps in New Zealand, including at Mount Taranaki.

Some road racing authorities consider his winning run at the Beppu-Ōita Marathon in 1978 (2:09:05.6) to have been a marathon world best. (Note: The International Association of Athletics Federations has published a progression of road racing world bests and records that were widely recognized prior to ratification and official acceptance by the IAAF. According to that progression, Derek Clayton's 2:08:34 performance in Antwerp on 30 May 1969 was a world best at the time. Other road racing authorities, including the Association of Road Racing Statisticians, consider Clayton's performance to have occurred on a short course and recognize other athletes in the progression for world best in the marathon.)

== Achievements ==
- All results regarding marathon, unless stated otherwise

Year	Competition	Venue	Position	Notes
Representing Japan
1973	Nobeoka Marathon	Nobeoka, Japan	1st	2:17:29
1974	Fukuoka Marathon	Fukuoka, Japan	16th	2:18:32
1975	Fukuoka Marathon	Fukuoka, Japan	16th	2:15:50
1976	Lake Biwa Marathon	Ōtsu, Japan	3rd	2:18:05
1976	Olympic Games	Montreal, Canada	20th	2:18:26
1976	Fukuoka Marathon	Fukuoka, Japan	4th	2:14:59
1978	Beppu-Ōita Marathon	Beppu-Ōita, Japan	1st	2:09:06
1978	Lake Biwa Marathon	Ōtsu, Japan	3rd	2:17:13
1978	Fukuoka Marathon	Fukuoka, Japan	3rd	2:11:41
1979	Lake Biwa Marathon	Ōtsu, Japan	1st	2:13:26
1979	Open Spartakiada Marathon	Moscow, Russia	2nd	2:13:20
1979	Fukuoka Marathon	Fukuoka, Japan	2nd	2:10:37
1980	Fukuoka Marathon	Fukuoka, Japan	5th	2:10:23
1981	Beppu-Ōita Marathon	Beppu-Ōita, Japan	1st	2:11:30
1981	Fukuoka Marathon	Fukuoka, Japan	3rd	2:10:19
1983	Tokyo Marathon	Tokyo, Japan	10th	2:13:18
1983	Fukuoka Marathon	Fukuoka, Japan	3rd	2:09:11
1984	Olympic Games	Los Angeles, United States	17th	2:14:38
1985	Tokyo Marathon	Tokyo, Japan	1st	2:10:32
1985	1985 World Marathon Cup	Hiroshima, Japan	17th	2:12:27
1985	Beijing Marathon	Beijing, PR China	1st	2:10:23
1987	London Marathon	London, United Kingdom	21st	2:14:53
1989	Beppu-Ōita Marathon	Beppu-Ōita, Japan	5th	2:12:49
