= Kenji Kimihara =

Japanese long-distance runner

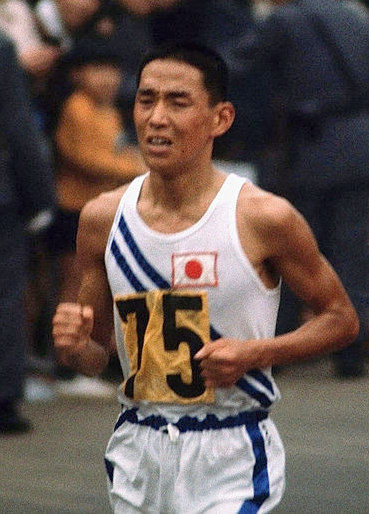
- Kenji Kimihara at the 1964 Olympics

Personal information
- Born: March 20, 1941 (age 85) Kitakyūshū, Fukuoka, Japan
- Height: 1.67 m (5 ft 6 in)
- Weight: 58 kg (128 lb)

Sport
- Country: Japan
- Sport: Long-distance running
Medal record
Olympic Games
Silver medal – second place	1968 Mexico City	Marathon
Asian Games
Gold medal – first place	1966 Bangkok	Marathon
Gold medal – first place	1970 Bangkok	Marathon

Kenji Kimihara (君原 健二, Kimihara Kenji; born March 20, 1941) is a retired Japanese long-distance runner. He competed in the marathon at the 1964, 1968 and 1972 Olympics and finished in eighth, second and fifth place, respectively. He won two gold medals in the marathon at the Asian Games in 1966 and 1970, and won the Boston Marathon in 1966.

He was very successful on the Japanese road racing circuit, winning the Tokyo International Marathon and Lake Biwa Marathon in both 1963 and 1964, and registering four wins at the Beppu-Ōita Marathon between 1967 and 1973.

Kimihara raced in the 2016 Boston Marathon, celebrating the 50th anniversary of his 1966 win. He completed the race in a time of 4:53:14.

== Achievements ==
- All results regarding marathon, unless stated otherwise

Year	Competition	Venue	Position	Notes
Representing Japan
1963	Lake Biwa Marathon	Ōtsu, Japan	1st	2:20:24
1964	Lake Biwa Marathon	Ōtsu, Japan	1st	2:17:11
1966	Boston Marathon	Boston, United States	1st	2:17:11
1967	Beppu-Ōita Marathon	Beppu-Ōita, Japan	1st	2:13:34
1970	Beppu-Ōita Marathon	Beppu-Ōita, Japan	1st	2:17:12
1971	Beppu-Ōita Marathon	Beppu-Ōita, Japan	1st	2:16:52
1973	Beppu-Ōita Marathon	Beppu-Ōita, Japan	1st	2:14:56
