= Kurao Hiroshima =

Japanese long-distance runner

Kurao Hiroshima (廣島 庫夫, Hiroshima Kurao; 5 December 1928 – 11 May 1996) was a Japanese long-distance runner who specialised in the marathon. Born in Kitago, Higashiusuki District, Miyazaki, he went on to represent his country twice at the Olympic Games: he finished 33rd in the marathon at the 1956 Summer Olympics and returned for the same event four years later at the 1960 Rome Olympics, taking 31st position with a time of 2:29:40.

Outside of the Olympics, Hiroshima experienced much success on the Japanese marathon circuit. He made his first impact at the Japanese national championships: becoming the national champion for the first time in Tokyo in 1953 and for a second time in Fukuoka in 1955. Between 1953 and 1959 he often registered within the world's top twenty fastest marathon runners of the year. He was a three-time winner of the Lake Biwa Marathon, with victories in 1955, 1957 and 1959.

His achievements at the Fukuoka Marathon singled him out as one of the best Japanese runners of his generation: his winning time of 2:21:40 in 1957 was a new Japanese record, the fifth fastest in the world that year. He became the first runner to win twice in Fukuoka when he took the title again two years later.

At the Beppu-Ōita Marathon, he was also the first athlete to win on multiple occasions (in 1956 and 1958). He also proved himself adept at the 20 kilometres distance when he won the Kashima Yutoku 20K in both 1955 and 1957.

Although Hiroshima was largely focused on running in Japan throughout his career, he competed at the Boston Marathon in 1954 and just missed out on a podium place in fourth position.

== Achievements ==
- All results regarding marathon, unless stated otherwise

Year	Competition	Venue	Position	Notes
Representing Japan
1955	Mainichi Marathon	Ōsaka, Japan	1st	2:26:32
1956	Beppu-Ōita Marathon	Beppu-Ōita, Japan	1st	2:26:24
1957	Mainichi Marathon	Ōsaka, Japan	1st	2:31:20
1957	Fukuoka Marathon	Fukuoka, Japan	1st	2:21:40
1958	Beppu-Ōita Marathon	Beppu-Ōita, Japan	1st	2:25:16
1959	Mainichi Marathon	Ōsaka, Japan	1st	2:30:06
1959	Fukuoka Marathon	Fukuoka, Japan	1st	2:29:34

== Personal bests ==
Event	Time (h:m:s)	Race	Venue	Date
Marathon	2:21:40	Fukuoka Marathon	Fukuoka, Japan	1 December 1957
