= Kenichi Suzuki (runner) =

Japanese long-distance runner

Kenichi Suzuki (鈴木 賢一, Suzuki Ken'ichi; born April 6, 1967) is a retired male long-distance runner from Japan, who won the 1993 edition of Amsterdam Marathon, clocking 2:11:56 on September 26, 1993.

== Achievements ==
Year	Competition	Venue	Position	Event	Notes
Representing Japan
1993	Amsterdam Marathon	Amsterdam, Netherlands	1st	Marathon	2:11:56
1994	Lake Biwa Marathon	Ōtsu, Japan	1st	Marathon	2:11:05
