= Shuichi Morita =

Japanese long-distance runner

Shuichi Morita (森田 修一; born February 3, 1965) is a retired long-distance runner from Japan, who won the 1991 edition of the Fukuoka Marathon, clocking 2:10:58 on December 1, 1991. The event also served as the national championship contest.

== Achievements ==
Year	Competition	Venue	Position	Event	Notes
Representing Japan
1991	Fukuoka Marathon	Fukuoka, Japan	1st	Marathon	2:10:58
