= Satoru Sasaki =

Japanese long-distance runner

Satoru Sasaki (Japanese: 佐々木悟; born 16 October 1985) is a Japanese long-distance runner who specialises in marathon running.

Sasaki finished 3rd at the 2015 Fukuoka Marathon in 2:08:56, an IAAF Gold Label Road Race. He was the highest finishing runner from Japan in this race. He achieved this without being an invited runner for the race. This finish earned him selection for the 2016 Olympics, where he finished 16th.
