= Toru Terasawa =

Japanese long-distance runner (1935–2025)

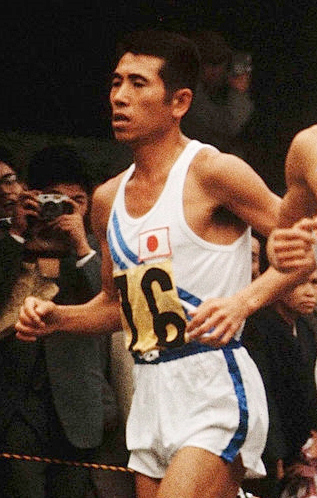
- Terasawa at the 1964 Olympics

Personal information
- Born: January 4, 1935 Toyama Prefecture, Japan
- Died: March 23, 2025 (aged 90)
- Height: 1.63 m (5 ft 4 in)
- Weight: 54 kg (119 lb)

Sport
- Sport: Long-distance running

Toru Terasawa (寺沢 徹, Terasawa Tōru; January 4, 1935 – March 23, 2025) was a Japanese long-distance runner who on February 17, 1963 set a world record in the marathon with a time of 2:15:16 at the Beppu Marathon. Terasawa placed second in the marathon at the 1964 Japanese Olympic trials and 15th at the 1964 Summer Olympics. Terasawa is also a two-time champion of the Fukuoka Marathon; he set a Japanese national record during his 1962 victory (2:16:18.4) and improved on it when he won in 1964 (2:14:48.2). At Fukuoka in 1966, he finished fifth (2:15:51.2) after colliding with Jim Hogan, the 1966 European marathon champion, and falling to the pavement just before the halfway mark.

When Morio Shigematsu set the world record at the 1965 Polytechnic Marathon, Terasawa finished second. His 2:13:41 performance was the third best ever at the time In 1965, he set his second world record, in the 30 km, and in 1969 he won the Nagano Marathon. He died on March 23, 2025, at the age of 90.

== Achievements ==
- All results regarding marathon, unless stated otherwise

Year	Competition	Venue	Position	Notes
Representing Japan
1962	Fukuoka Marathon	Fukuoka, Japan	1st	2:16:19
1963	Beppu-Ōita Marathon	Beppu-Ōita, Japan	1st	2:15:16
1964	Fukuoka Marathon	Fukuoka, Japan	1st	2:14:49
1964	Beppu-Ōita Marathon	Beppu-Ōita, Japan	1st	2:17:49
1965	Beppu-Ōita Marathon	Beppu-Ōita, Japan	1st	2:14:38
1966	Beppu-Ōita Marathon	Beppu-Ōita, Japan	1st	2:14:35
1969	Nagano Commemorative Marathon	Nagano, Japan	1st	2:21:02

Records
Preceded by (Ethiopia) Abebe Bikila	Men's Marathon World Record Holder; February 17, 1963 – June 15, 1963	Succeeded by (United States) Leonard Edelen
