= Tokyo International Marathon =

Marathon

The Tokyo International Marathon was a marathon for male elite runners held in Tokyo, Japan, from 1980 until 2006.

It actually consisted of two marathons - the Tokyo International Marathon which took place on even years, and Tokyo-New York Friendship International Marathon which took place on odd years. In the inaugural year, 1981, both marathons took place. However, because it was not possible to support two marathons a month apart in the same city, from 1982, the alternating format went into effect. The events were replaced in 2007 by the Tokyo Marathon, a race which is open to general runners of both sexes.

Between 1979 and 2008 there was also a Tokyo International Women's Marathon for female elite runners in November.

== Winners ==
Key: Course record

| Year | Athlete | Country | Time |
|---|---|---|---|
| 1981 Feb | Hideki Kita | Japan | 2:12:04 |
| 1981 Mar | Rodolfo Gomez | Mexico | 2:11:00 |
| 1982 | Vadim Sidorov | Soviet Union | 2:10:33 |
| 1983 | Toshihiko Seko | Japan | 2:08:38 |
| 1984 | Juma Ikangaa | Tanzania | 2:10:49 |
| 1985 | Shigeru So | Japan | 2:10:32 |
| 1986 | Juma Ikangaa | Tanzania | 2:08:10 |
| 1987 | Hiromi Taniguchi | Japan | 2:10:06 |
| 1988 | Abebe Mekonnen | Ethiopia | 2:08:33 |
| 1989 | Hiromi Taniguchi | Japan | 2:09:34 |
| 1990 | Takeyuki Nakayama | Japan | 2:10:57 |
| 1991 | Abebe Mekonnen | Ethiopia | 2:10:26 |
| 1992 | Koichi Morishita | Japan | 2:10:19 |
| 1993 | Abebe Mekonnen | Ethiopia | 2:12:00 |
| 1994 | Steve Moneghetti | Australia | 2:08:55 |
| 1995 | Erick Wainaina | Kenya | 2:10:31 |
| 1996 | Vanderlei de Lima | Brazil | 2:08:38 |
| 1997 | Koji Shimizu | Japan | 2:10:09 |
| 1998 | Alberto Juzdado | Spain | 2:08:01 |
| 1999 | Gert Thys | South Africa | 2:06:33 |
| 2000 | Japhet Kosgei | Kenya | 2:07:15 |
| 2001 | Kenichi Takahashi | Japan | 2:10:51 |
| 2002 | Erick Wainaina | Kenya | 2:08:43 |
| 2003 | Zebedayo Bayo | Tanzania | 2:09:07 |
| 2004 | Daniel Njenga | Kenya | 2:08:43 |
| 2005 | Toshinari Takaoka | Japan | 2:07:41 |
| 2006 | Ambesse Tolosa | Ethiopia | 2:08:58 |

== See also ==
- Tokyo Marathon
