= Beppu-Ōita Marathon =

Annual marathon between Beppu and Ōita, Japan

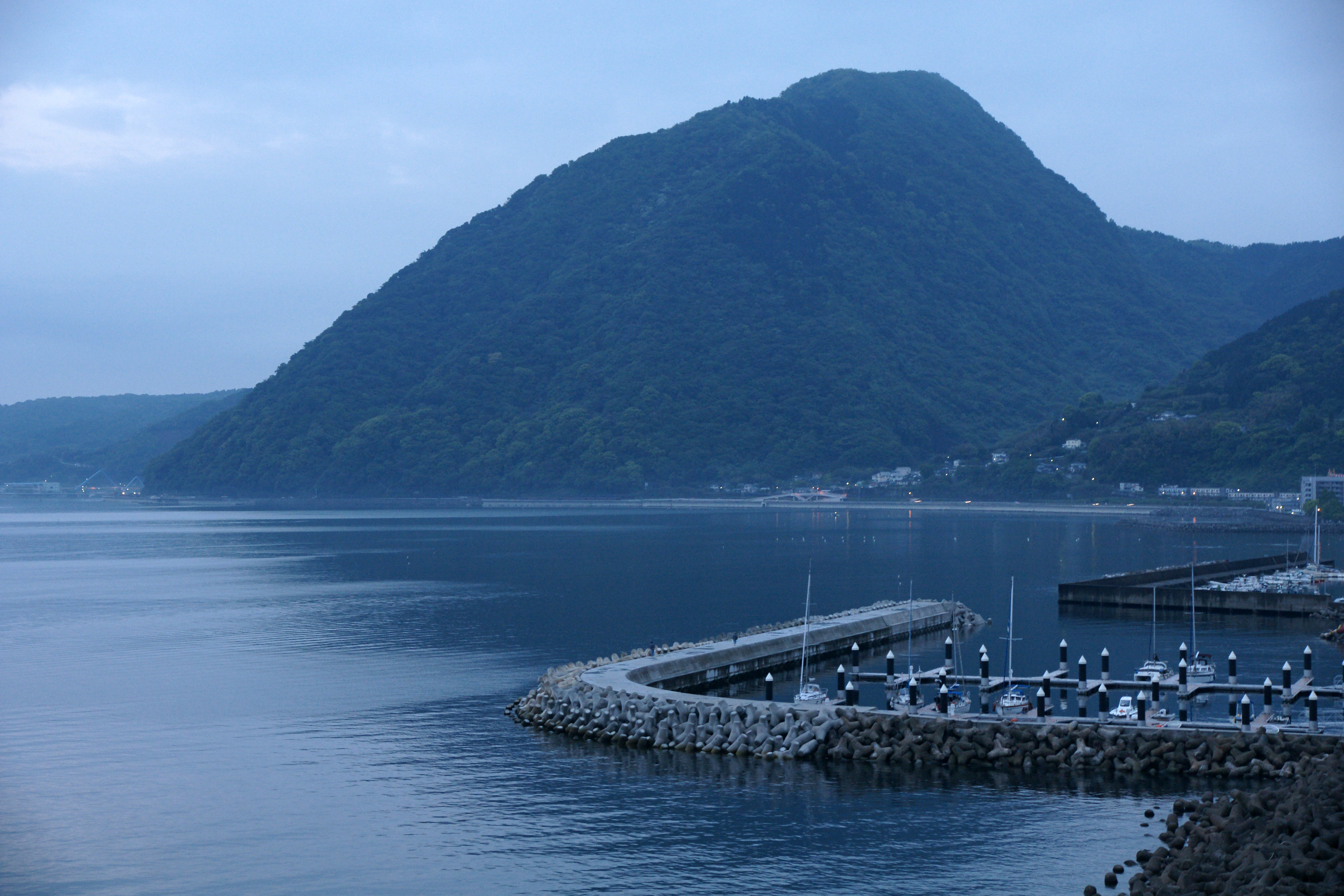
- Beppu Bay, near the turning point of the race between Beppu and Ōita
- Date: Early February
- Location: Beppu and Ōita, Japan
- Event type: Road
- Distance: Marathon
- Established: 1952
- Course records: Men : 2:06:43 (Djibouti) Ibrahim Hassan (2023); Women : 2:33:00 (Japan) Hiroko Yoshitomi (2018)
- Website: Beppu-Ōita Mainichi Marathon
- Participants: 355 finishers (2022); 3,130 (2020)

The Beppu-Ōita Mainichi Marathon (別府大分毎日マラソン, Beppu Ōita Mainichi Marason) is an annual marathon race that takes place every February between the cities of Beppu and Ōita on the island of Kyushu in Japan. The race has IAAF Silver Label Road Race status and is a listed course of AIMS (Association of International Marathons).

== Course History ==
First held in 1952 as a 35 km race, the looped marathon course begins at the bottom of Takasaki Mountain and reaches Beppu's Kankoko International Port before turning back towards the finishing point in the Ōita Municipal Athletic Stadium. The event is sponsored by The Mainichi Newspapers Co. and is formally known as the Beppu-Ōita Mainichi Marathon. It hosted the Asian Marathon Championship in 1994.

The course is AIMS-certified which means that performances on the course are eligible for national and world records. The course has historically provided fast times: in 1963 Tōru Terasawa's time of 2:15:15.8 was recognised as the marathon world best and fifteen years later Shigeru Sō brought the course its second world best with his winning time of 2:09:05.6 in 1978. (Note: The International Association of Athletics Federations has published a progression of road racing world bests and records that were widely recognized prior to ratification and official acceptance by the IAAF. According to that progression, Derek Clayton's 2:08:34 performance in Antwerp on May 30, 1969 was a world best at the time. Other road racing authorities, including the Association of Road Racing Statisticians, consider Clayton's performance to have occurred on a short course and recognize other athletes in the progression for world best in the marathon.) Furthermore, Koichi Morishita's win in 1991 was the fastest time recorded that year. Gert Thys of South Africa won the race in 1996 with a time of 2:08:30 and his mark stood for seventeen years until Yuki Kawauchi completed the course in 2:08:15 in 2013.

The marathon race attracts approximately 500 entrants each year, of whom around two-thirds finish the course. The large majority of the runners are Japanese, or Japanese-based. A small number of international athletes are invited to compete each year, although other foreign athletes also appear in the race for pace setting purposes. An additional road race, the Beppu-Oita Mainichi Half Marathon, was held in conjunction with the main race between 1976 and 2001.

== Past winners ==
Key: Course record 35 km course Asian Marathon Championship race

Year	Men's winner	Time (h:m:s)	Women's winner	Time (h:m:s)
2024	Derese Workneh (ETH)	2:07:58	Aoi Makara (JPN)	2:40:31
2023	Ibrahim Hassan (DJI)	2:06:43	Zeyituba Husan (ETH)	2:31:40
2022	Yusuke Nishiyama (JPN)	2:07:47	Misato Michishita (JPN)	2:57:20
2020	Hamza Sahli (MAR)	2:08:01	Rochelle Rodgers (AUS)	2:40:02
2019	Hicham Laqouahi (MAR)	2:08:35	Haruka Yamaguchi (JPN)	2:36:51
2018	Desmond Mokgobu (RSA)	2:09:31	Hiroko Yoshitomi (JPN)	2:33:00
2017	Kentaro Nakamoto (JPN)	2:09:32	Haruka Yamaguchi (JPN)	2:40:31
2016	Melaku Abera (ETH)	2:09:27	Hiroko Yoshitomi (JPN)	2:45:07
2015	Tewelde Estifanos (ERI)	2:10:18	Chiyuki Mochizuki (JPN)	2:41:28
2014	Abraham Kiplimo (UGA)	2:09:23	Haruka Yamaguchi (JPN)	2:41:56
2013	Yuki Kawauchi (JPN)	2:08:15	Chiyuki Mochizuki (JPN)	2:40:11
2012	Harun Mbugua (KEN)	2:09:38	Chiyuki Mochizuki (JPN)	2:43:12
2011	Ahmed Baday (MAR)	2:10:14	Chiyuki Mochizuki (JPN)	2:39:57
2010	Jonathan Kipkorir (KEN)	2:10:50		
2009	Adil Annani (MAR)	2:10:15		
2008	Tomoya Adachi (JPN)	2:11:59		
2007	Atsushi Fujita (JPN)	2:10:23		
2006	Gert Thys (RSA)	2:09:45		
2005	Satoshi Irifune (JPN)	2:09:58		
2004	Hiroaki Takeda (JPN)	2:12:02		
2003	Samson Ramadhani (TAN)	2:09:24		
2002	Sammy Korir (KEN)	2:11:45		
2001	Takayuki Nishida (JPN)	2:08:45		
2000	Kazutaka Enoki (JPN)	2:10:44		
1999	Éder Fialho (BRA)	2:09:54		
1998	Akira Shimizu (JPN)	2:09:11		
1997	Rolando Vera (ECU)	2:12:00		
1996	Gert Thys (RSA)	2:08:30		
1995	Patrick Carroll (AUS)	2:09:39		
1994	Hajime Nakatomi (JPN)	2:11:28		
1993	Maurilio Castillo (MEX)	2:13:04		
1992	Dionicio Cerón (MEX)	2:08:36		
1991	Kōichi Morishita (JPN)	2:08:53		
1990	Bogusław Psujek (POL)	2:11:56		
1989	Satoru Shimizu (JPN)	2:12:26		
1988	Bruno Lafranchi (SUI)	2:11:58		
1987	Yoshihiro Nishimura (JPN)	2:12:03		
1986	Taisuke Kodama (JPN)	2:10:34		
1985	Hiromi Taniguchi (JPN)	2:13:16		
1984	Cor Vriend (NED)	2:12:05		
1983	Yoshihiro Nishimura (JPN)	2:13:55		
1982	Bob Hodge (USA)	2:15:43		
1981	Shigeru So (JPN)	2:11:30		
1980	Yutaka Taketomi (JPN)	2:13:29		
1979	Hideki Kita (JPN)	2:13:30		
1978	Shigeru So (JPN)	2:09:06		
1977	Yasunori Hamada (JPN)	2:13:57		
1976	Yukio Shigetake (JPN)	2:14:23		
1975	Ken’ichi Ozawa (JPN)	2:13:11		
1974	Yasunori Hamada (JPN)	2:13:05		
1973	Kenji Kimihara (JPN)	2:14:56		
1972	Yoshiro Mifune (JPN)	2:19:11		
1971	Kenji Kimihara (JPN)	2:16:52		
1970	Kenji Kimihara (JPN)	2:17:12		
1969	Tadaaki Ueoka (JPN)	2:14:04		
1968	Seiichiro Sasaki (JPN)	2:13:24		
1967	Kenji Kimihara (JPN)	2:13:34		
1966	Toru Terasawa (JPN)	2:14:35		
1965	Toru Terasawa (JPN)	2:14:38		
1964	Toru Terasawa (JPN)	2:17:49		
1963	Toru Terasawa (JPN)	2:15:16		
1962	Hideaki Shishido (JPN)	2:23:54		
1961	Hiroshi Uwa (JPN)	2:23:45		
1960	Kazumi Watanabe (JPN)	2:23:30		
1959	Yoshitaka Tsukiji (JPN)	2:23:40		
1958	Kurao Hiroshima (JPN)	2:25:16		
1957	Nobuyoshi Sadanaga (JPN)	2:26:40		
1956	Kurao Hiroshima (JPN)	2:26:24		
1955	Katsuo Nishida (JPN)	2:29:19		
1954	Yoshitaka Uchikawa (JPN)	2:34:48		
1953	Keizō Yamada (JPN)	2:29:05		
1952	Hideo Hamamura (JPN)	2:01:50		

== Statistics ==
=== Winners by country ===
Country	Wins
Japan	46
Morocco	3
South Africa	3
Kenya	2
Mexico	2
Australia	1
Brazil	1
Ecuador	1
Netherlands	1
Poland	1
Switzerland	1
Tanzania	1
United States	1
Ethiopia	1

=== Multiple winners ===
Athlete	Country	Wins	Years
Tōru Terasawa	Japan	4	1963, 1964, 1965, 1966
Kenji Kimihara	Japan	4	1967, 1970, 1971, 1973
Kurao Hiroshima	Japan	2	1956, 1958
Yasunori Hamada	Japan	2	1974, 1977
Shigeru Sō	Japan	2	1978, 1981
Yoshihiro Nishimura	Japan	2	1983, 1987
Gert Thys	South Africa	2	1996, 2006
