= Fukuoka Marathon =

Annual race in Japan held since 1947

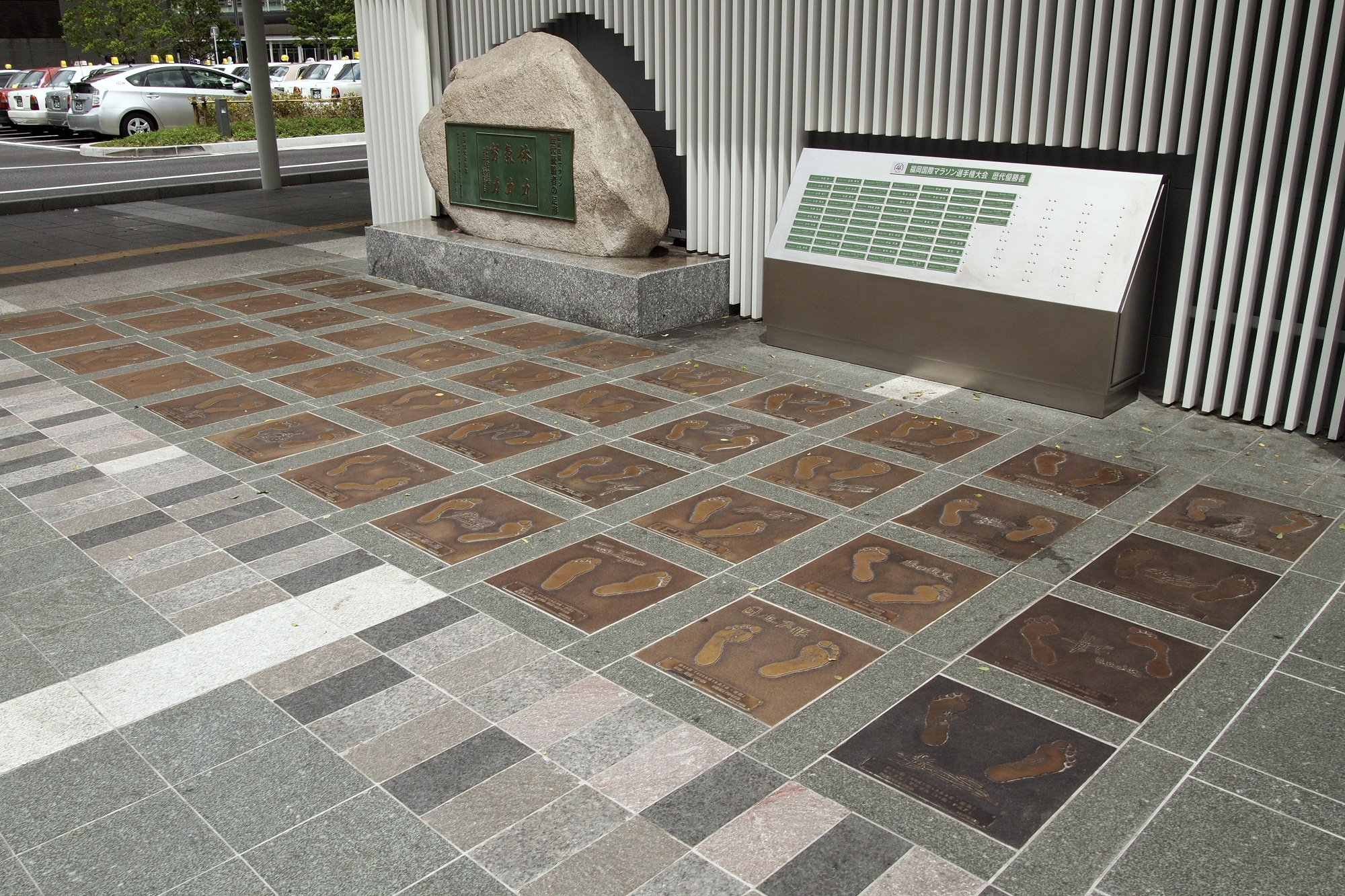
- The Fukuoka Marathon monument at Hakata Station with footprints of past winners
- Date: Early December
- Location: Fukuoka, Japan
- Event type: Road
- Distance: Marathon
- Established: 1947 (79 years ago)
- Course records: 2:05:18 (2009) (Ethiopia) Tsegaye Kebede
- Website: Fukuoka Marathon
- Participants: 80 finishers (2021); 67 (2020); 370 (2019); 291 (2018)

The Fukuoka International Marathon (福岡国際マラソン, Fukuoka Kokusai Marason) is an IAAF Gold Label international men's marathon race held in Fukuoka, Japan. It was previously known as the Fukuoka International Open Marathon Championship between 1947 and 2021, when it was announced the race would be discontinued on its 75th edition. However, due to popular support, a successor race, inheriting the tradition and course of the original marathon, was established the next year.

The course record is held by Tsegaye Kebede of Ethiopia, running 2:05:18 in 2009 to best his own record from the previous year. Toshihiko Seko (1978–80, '83) and Frank Shorter (1971–74) tie for most victories at the race with four each.

== History ==
In its early years, the race had a rotating venue format, but these races are contained within the Fukuoka history as they all shared a common organiser and sponsor (the Asahi Shimbun, a Japanese national newspaper). The inaugural edition was launched in 1947 as the "Kanaguri Prize Asahi Marathon" (金栗賞朝日マラソン, Kanaguri-Shō Asahi Marason) and was held in Kumamoto. The 1951 was the first of the race series to be held in Fukuoka. Foreign runners were invited for the first time in 1954 and Reinaldo Gorno of Argentina subsequently became the first non-Japanese winner. The competition was renamed as the "Asahi International Marathon" (朝日国際マラソン, Asahi Kokusai Marason) the following year and Finland's Veikko Karvonen became the first European victor. In 1956 the race reverted to a national race between Japanese men, but foreign runners were reintroduced for later editions.

The 1959 edition saw Fukuoka instated was the permanent host city for the marathon race and Japanese runner Kurao Hiroshima became the first two-time winner that year. Water stations for runners were introduced along the course for the first time in 1961. The last race to be held outside of Fukuoka came in 1963, when a special pre-Olympic edition was held in Tokyo as a way of testing the marathon course for the 1964 Tokyo Olympics. Recognising the Fukuoka Marathon's increasingly international nature, the event was renamed in 1966 to the "International Marathon Championship" (国際マラソン選手権, Kokusai Marason Senshuken). A year later, the course saw its first world record performance as Australian Derek Clayton knocked over two minutes off the previous record to win the race in 2:09:36.4 hours. Frank Shorter had three straight wins in 1971 to 1973 and a fourth win came in 1974, the same year that the race took on its current title of the "Fukuoka International Open Marathon Championship" (福岡国際マラソン選手権, Fukuoka Kokusai Marason Senshuken).

In 1980, Toshihiko Seko won in a time of 2:09:45 hours, just four seconds ahead of Takeshi So. This represented the first time that two men had completed the marathon distance under two hours and ten minutes at the same competition. The second world record of the competition's history came in 1981 and it was again an Australian runner, this time Robert de Castella, whose time of 2:08:18 hours became the new world standard.

In 2020, due to the coronavirus pandemic, organizers restricted the number of participants to about 100 runners. (Note: The size of the field is normally around 400 runners.)

On March 26, 2021, the Japan Association of Athletics Federations, newspaper Asahi Shimbun, and broadcast partners Kyushu Asahi Broadcasting and TV Asahi announced that the 75th Fukuoka International Marathon would be its last edition citing difficulties in continuing the event such as increasing operating costs and the COVID-19 pandemic.

However, on March 15, 2021, the JAAF and the Fukuoka Prefectural Government announced that a successor race would be held in December of that year "maintaining [the] history and tradition" of the original championship.

The Fukuoka Marathon is the third-longest running competition of its type in Japan, being established two years after the Lake Biwa Marathon and one year after the Kochi Marathon. This makes it the tenth longest running annual marathon race in recorded history. The competition has hosted the men's marathon championship race numerous times: it first held the event in 1955 and then hosted the race on a biennial basis from 1963 to 1997. It later hosted the national championship race once every three years, on a rotational basis alongside the Lake Biwa and Tokyo Marathons.

== Qualification ==
Male runners who achieved the following times in an official event of the International Association of Athletics Federation (IAAF) or a race for members of the Association of International Marathons and Distance Races (AIMS) in a certain period, and who were aged 19 years or older on the day of the race could apply for the race.

Group A:

1. Marathon: under 2 hours 27 minutes
2. 30 km road race: under 1 hour 35 minutes
3. Half-marathon: under 1 hour 05 minutes

Group B:

1. Marathon: under 2 hours 35 minutes
2. 30 km road race: under 1 hour 45 minutes
3. Half-marathon: under 1 hour 10 minutes

== Winners ==
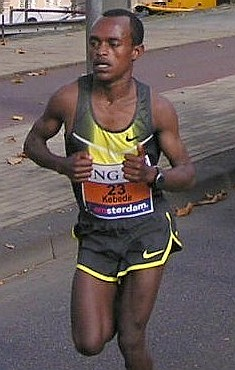
Ethiopia's Tsegaye Kebede winner in 2008-2009.

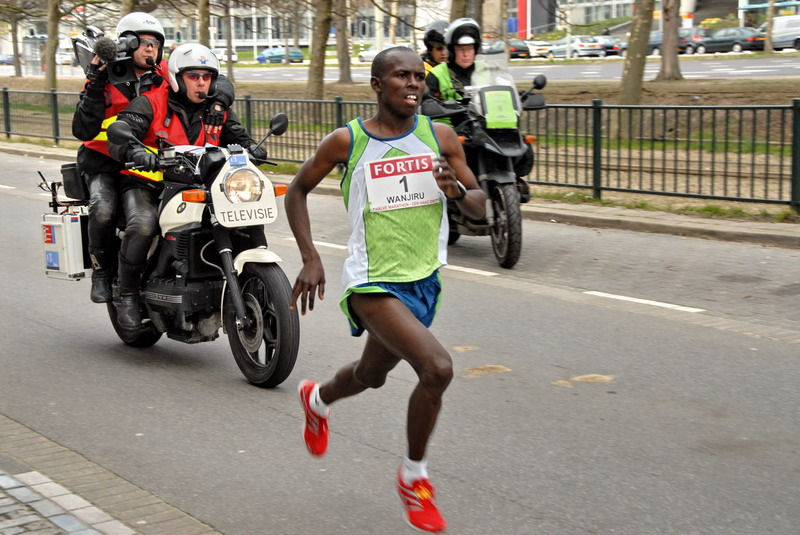
Samuel Wanjiru won in 2007 and went on to take the 2008 Olympic marathon title.

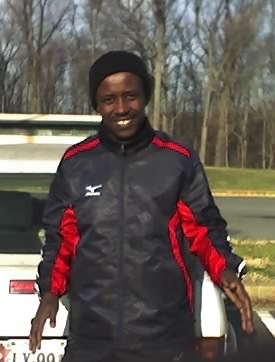
Gezahegne Abera is a three-time race winner

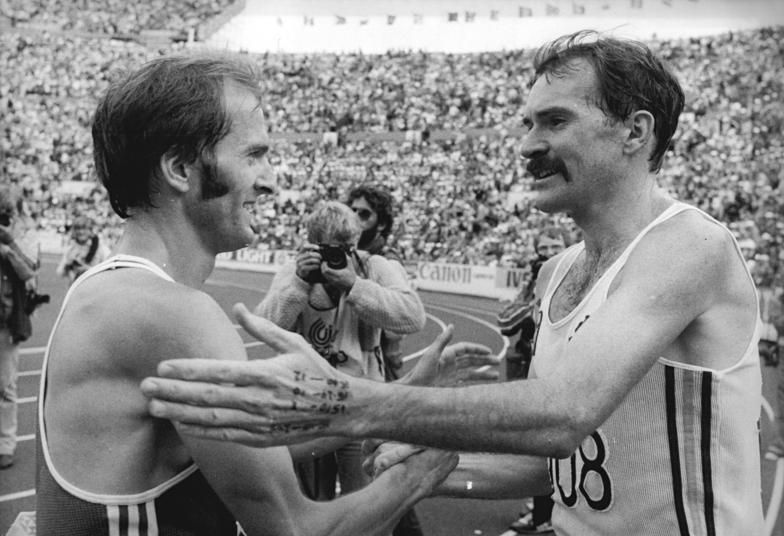
Robert de Castella (right) of Australia set a world record at the 1981 edition.

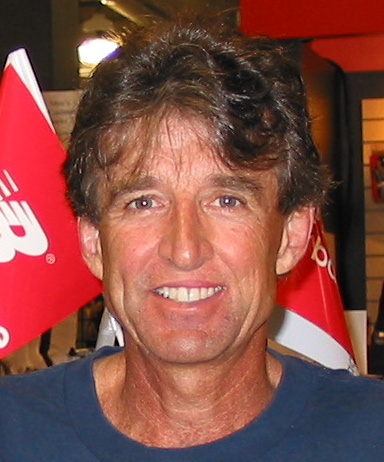
Frank Shorter had a record four straight wins in Fukuoka from 1971 to 1974.

Key:

Course record
Japanese championship race

Ed.	Date	Winner	Country	Time	Notes	Rf.
79	2025.12.07	Bayelign Teshager	Ethiopia	2:07:51		
78	2024.12.01	Yūya Yoshida	Japan	2:05:16		
77	2023.12.03	Michael Githae	Kenya	2:07:08		
76	2022.12.04	Maru Teferi	Israel	2:06:43		
75	2021.12.05	Michael Githae	Kenya	2:07:51		
74	2020.12.06	Yūya Yoshida	Japan	2:07:05		
73	2019.12.01	Taku Fujimoto (Note: El Mahjoub Dazza crossed the finish line first, but was disqualified for using a prohibited substance.)	Japan	2:09:36		
72	2018.12.02	Yuma Hattori	Japan	2:07:27		
71	2017.12.03	Sondre Nordstad Moen	Norway	2:05:48		
70	2016.12.04	Yemane Tsegay	Ethiopia	2:08:48		
69	2015.12.06	Patrick Makau	Kenya	2:08:18		
68	2014.12.07	Patrick Makau	Kenya	2:08:22		
67	2013.12.01	Martin Mathathi	Kenya	2:07:16		
66	2012.12.02	Joseph Gitau	Kenya	2:06:58		
65	2011.12.04	Josephat Ndambiri	Kenya	2:07:36		
64	2010.12.05	Jaouad Gharib	Morocco	2:08:24		
63	2009.12.06	Tsegaye Kebede	Ethiopia	2:05:18		
62	2008.12.07	Tsegaye Kebede	Ethiopia	2:06:10		
61	2007.12.02	Samuel Wanjiru	Kenya	2:06:39		
60	2006.12.03	Haile Gebrselassie	Ethiopia	2:06:52		
59	2005.12.04	Dmytro Baranovskyy	Ukraine	2:08:29		
58	2004.12.05	Tsuyoshi Ogata	Japan	2:09:10		
57	2003.12.07	Tomoaki Kunichika	Japan	2:07:52		
56	2002.12.01	Gezahegne Abera	Ethiopia	2:09:13		
55	2001.12.02	Gezahegne Abera	Ethiopia	2:09:25		
54	2000.12.03	Atsushi Fujita	Japan	2:06:51 NR		
53	1999.12.05	Gezahegne Abera	Ethiopia	2:07:54		
52	1998.12.06	Jackson Kabiga	Kenya	2:08:42		
51	1997.12.07	Josia Thugwane	South Africa	2:07:28		
50	1996.12.01	Lee Bong-ju	South Korea	2:10:48		
49	1995.12.03	Luíz Antônio	Brazil	2:09:30		
48	1994.12.04	Boay Akonay	Tanzania	2:09:45		
47	1993.12.05	Dionicio Cerón	Mexico	2:08:51		
46	1992.12.06	Tena Negere	Ethiopia	2:09:04		
45	1991.12.01	Shuichi Morita	Japan	2:10:58	Current course layout introduced	
44	1990.12.02	Belayneh Dinsamo	Ethiopia	2:11:35		
43	1989.12.03	Manuel Matias	Portugal	2:12:54		
42	1988.12.04	Toshihiro Shibutani	Japan	2:11:04		
41	1987.12.06	Takeyuki Nakayama	Japan	2:08:18		
40	1986.12.07	Juma Ikangaa	Tanzania	2:10:06		
39	1985.12.01	Hisatoshi Shintaku	Japan	2:09:51	Course layout changed	
38	1984.12.02	Takeyuki Nakayama	Japan	2:10:00		
37	1983.12.04	Toshihiko Seko	Japan	2:08:52		
36	1982.12.05	Paul Ballinger	New Zealand	2:10:15		
35	1981.12.06	Robert de Castella	Australia	2:08:18 WR		
34	1980.12.07	Toshihiko Seko	Japan	2:09:45		
33	1979.12.02	Toshihiko Seko	Japan	2:10:35		
32	1978.12.03	Toshihiko Seko	Japan	2:10:21		
31	1977.12.04	Bill Rodgers	United States	2:10:56		
30	1976.12.05	Jerome Drayton	Canada	2:12:35		
29	1975.12.07	Jerome Drayton	Canada	2:10:09		
28	1974.12.08	Frank Shorter	United States	2:11:32		
27	1973.12.02	Frank Shorter	United States	2:11:45		
26	1972.12.03	Frank Shorter	United States	2:10:30		
25	1971.12.05	Frank Shorter	United States	2:12:51		
24	1970.12.06	Akio Usami	Japan	2:10:38		
23	1969.12.07	Jerome Drayton	Canada	2:11:13		
22	1968.12.08	Bill Adcocks	United Kingdom	2:10:48		
21	1967.12.03	Derek Clayton	Australia	2:09:37 WR		
20	1966.11.27	Mike Ryan	New Zealand	2:14:05		
19	1965.10.10	Hidekuni Hiroshima	Japan	2:18:36		
18	1964.12.06	Toru Terasawa	Japan	2:14:49		
17	1963.10.15	Jeff Julian	New Zealand	2:18:01	Held in Tokyo	
16	1962.12.02	Toru Terasawa	Japan	2:16:19		
15	1961.12.03	Pavel Kantorek	Czechoslovakia	2:22:05		
14	1960.12.04	Barry Magee	New Zealand	2:19:04		
13	1959.11.08	Kurao Hiroshima	Japan	2:29:34	Fukuoka becomes permanent host	
12	1958.12.07	Nobuyoshi Sadanaga	Japan	2:24:01	Held in Utsunomiya	
11	1957.12.01	Kurao Hiroshima	Japan	2:21:40	Held in Fukuoka City	
10	1956.12.09	Keizo Yamada	Japan	2:25:15	Held in Nagoya	
9	1955.12.11	Veikko Karvonen	Finland	2:23:16	Held in Fukuoka/Koga	
8	1954.12.05	Reinaldo Gorno	Argentina	2:24:55	Held in Kamakura/Yokohama	
7	1953.12.06	Hideo Hamamura	Japan	2:27:26	Held in Nagoya	
6	1952.12.07	Katsuo Nishida	Japan	2:27:59	Held in Ube	
5	1951.12.09	Hiromi Haigo	Japan	2:30:13	Held in Fukuoka/Maebaru	
4	1950.12.10	Shunji Koyanagi	Japan	2:30:47	Held in Hiroshima	
3	1949.12.04	Shinzo Koga	Japan	2:40:26	Held in Shizuoka	
2	1948.12.05	Saburo Yamada	Japan	2:37:25	Held in Takamatsu	
1	1947.12.07	Toshikazu Wada	Japan	2:45:45	Held in Kumamoto	
