= Lake Biwa Marathon =

Road running event in Japan

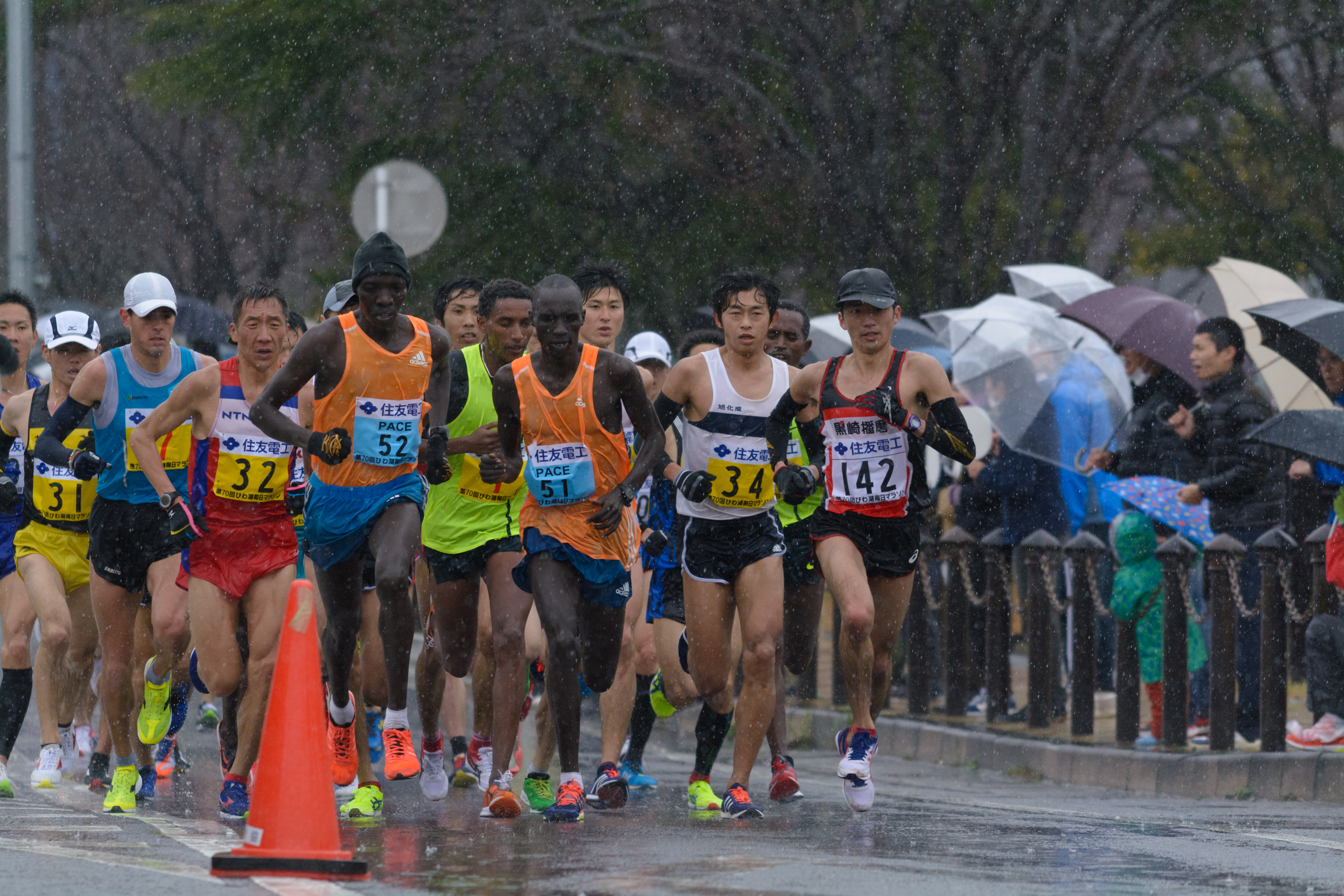
- 2015 Lake Biwa Marathon
- Date: Early March
- Location: Ōtsu, Shiga, Japan
- Event type: Road
- Distance: Marathon
- Primary sponsor: SEI; K-Opticom Corporation (2010–)
- Established: 1946
- Course records: 2:04:56 (2021) (Japan) Kengo Suzuki
- Website: Lake Biwa Marathon
- Participants: 325 (2021)

The Osaka-Lake Biwa Mainichi Marathon (びわ湖毎日マラソン, Biwako Mainichi Marason) was a marathon race held in Otsu, Shiga, Japan. It was one of the prominent marathons in Japan. It was a male only competition and had IAAF Gold Label status. It was first held in 1946 and, having taken place every year since then, it was Japan's oldest annual marathon race. The early editions of the race were held in Osaka until a switch to Tokyo occurred for the 1963–64 marathons, and all subsequent races thereafter were held in Shiga Prefecture, starting in Ōtsu fronting Lake Biwa, where the race received its name. It was sponsored by Mainichi and was known simply as the Mainichi Marathon for a period. The final race was held in 2021.

The race began and ended at the Ojiyama Stadium. The Lake Biwa Marathon was selected as the Japanese national marathon championships on dozens of occasions, starting in 1960. The course record for the competition was 2:04:56 hours, set by Kengo Suzuki at the final 2021 edition. The 2021 race was also noteworthy for having 29 runners finish in under 2:09:00 and 42 runners finish under 2:10:00.

The race was merged into the Osaka Marathon by the JAAF. The elite men's race at the Osaka Marathon for 2022 was designated by officials as the 77th Annual Lake Biwa Marathon, while the other races were billed as the Osaka Marathon.

== Winners ==
Key: Course record Japanese championship race Asian Marathon Championship race

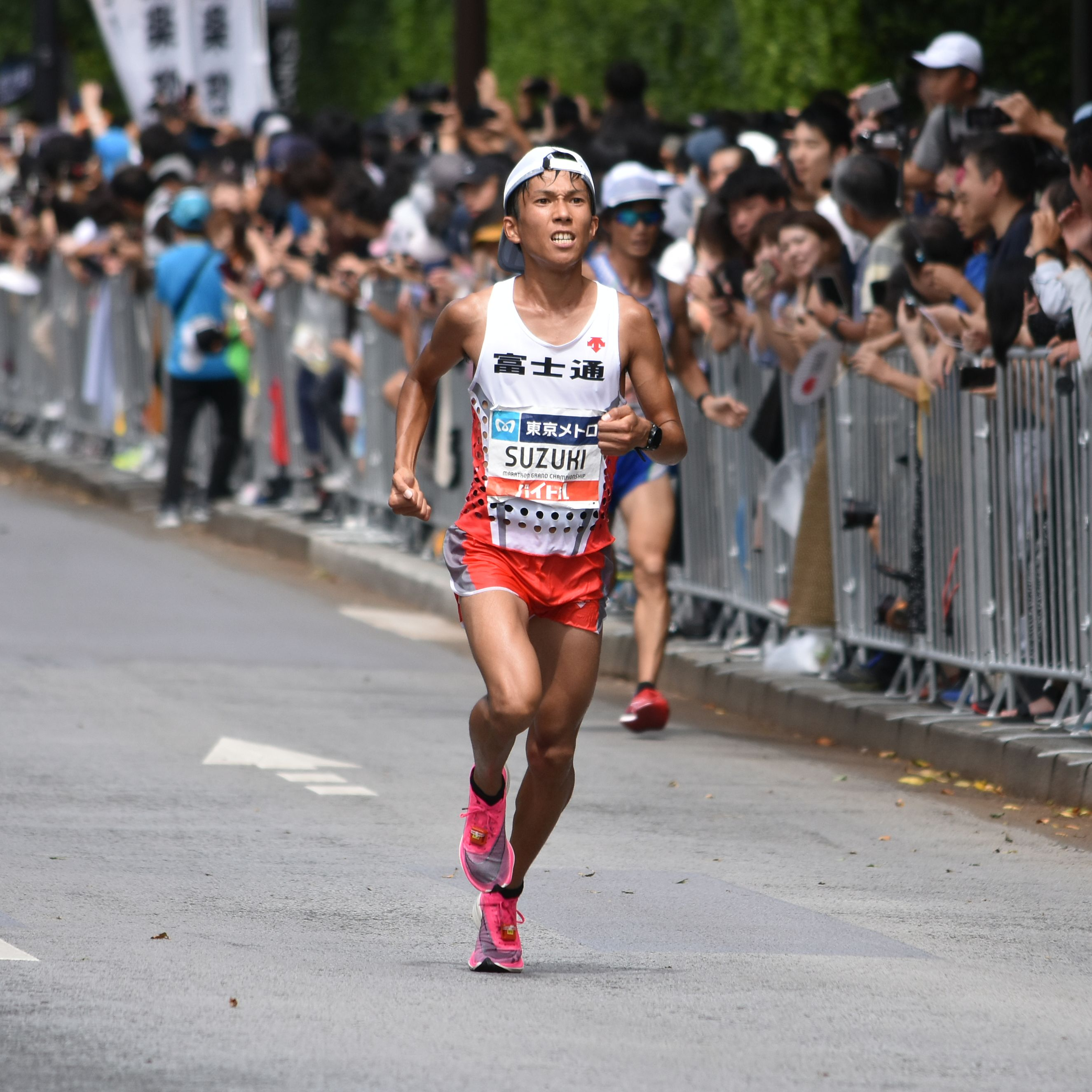
Record holder Kengo Suzuki (pictured in 2019)

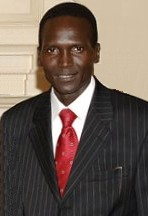
Paul Tergat won the 2009 competition

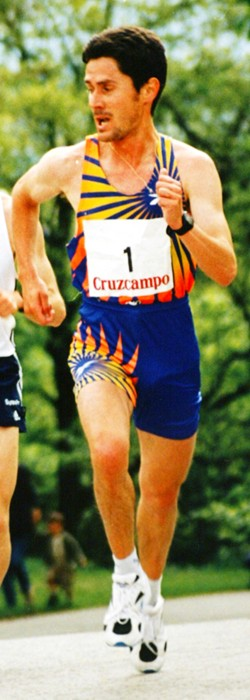
Martín Fiz of Spain is a three-time winner of the race

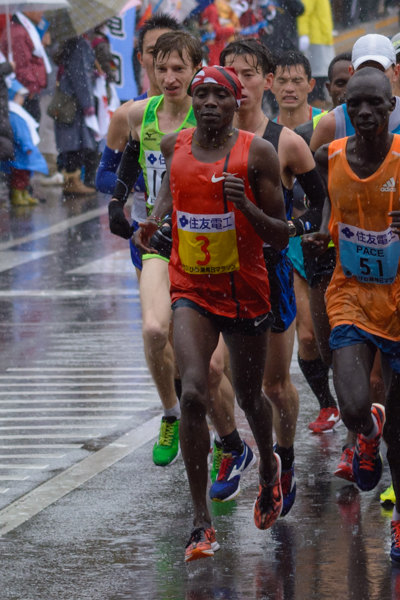
Samuel Ndungu

Edition	Date	Winner	Time
77th	27 February 2022	Gaku Hoshi (JPN)	2:07:31
76th	28 February 2021	Kengo Suzuki (JPN)	2:04:56
75th	8 March 2020	Evans Chebet (KEN)	2:07:29
74th	10 March 2019	Salah-Eddine Bounasr (MAR)	2:07:52
73rd	4 March 2018	Joseph Ndirangu (KEN)	2:07:53
72nd	5 March 2017	Ezekiel Chebii (KEN)	2:09:06
71st	6 March 2016	Lucas Rotich (KEN)	2:09:11
70th	1 March 2015	Samuel Ndungu (KEN)	2:09:08
69th	2 March 2014	Bazu Worku (ETH)	2:09:10
68th	3 March 2013	Vincent Kipruto (KEN)	2:08:34
67th	4 March 2012	Samuel Ndungu (KEN)	2:07:04
66th	6 March 2011	Wilson Kipsang (KEN)	2:06:13
65th	7 March 2010	Yemane Tsegay (ETH)	2:09:34
64th	1 March 2009	Paul Tergat (KEN)	2:10:22
63rd	2 March 2008	Mubarak Hassan Shami (QAT)	2:08:23
62nd	4 March 2007	Samson Ramadhani (TAN)	2:10:43
61st	5 March 2006	José Ríos (ESP)	2:09:15
60th	6 March 2005	Joseph Riri (KEN)	2:09:00
59th	7 March 2004	José Ríos (ESP)	2:07:42
58th	2 March 2003	Japhet Kosgei (KEN)	2:07:39
57th	3 March 2002	Ryūji Takei (JPN)	2:08:35
56th	4 March 2001	Antoni Peña (ESP)	2:07:34
55th	5 March 2000	Martín Fiz (ESP)	2:08:14
54th	7 March 1999	Martín Fiz (ESP)	2:08:50
53rd	1 March 1998	Muneyuki Ojima (JPN)	2:08:43
52nd	2 March 1997	Martín Fiz (ESP)	2:08:05
51st	3 March 1996	Joaquim Pinheiro (POR)	2:09:32
50th	19 March 1995	Yūji Nakamura (JPN)	2:10:49
49th	6 March 1994	Kenichi Suzuki (JPN)	2:11:05
48th	14 March 1993	Mike O'Reilly (IRL)	2:11:01
47th	15 March 1992	Mike O'Reilly (IRL)	2:13:15
46th	10 March 1991	Simon Mrashani (TAN)	2:11:34
45th	11 March 1990	Eddy Hellebuyck (BEL)	2:13:03
44th	12 March 1989	Tōru Kozasu (JPN)	2:14:31
43rd	13 March 1988	Toshihiko Seko (JPN)	2:12:41
42nd	8 March 1987	Fumiaki Abe (JPN)	2:11:08
41st	9 March 1986	Toshihiro Shibutani (JPN)	2:14:55
40th	10 March 1985	Fumiaki Abe (JPN)	2:11:04
39th	11 March 1984	Tetsuji Iwase (JPN)	2:14:24
38th	13 March 1983	Kōshirō Kawaguchi (JPN)	2:13:22
37th	14 March 1982	Michio Mizukubo (JPN)	2:15:23
36th	15 March 1981	Masao Matsuo (JPN)	2:14:38
35th	23 March 1980	Hiroshi Yuge (JPN)	2:14:33
34th	15 April 1979	Shigeru So (JPN)	2:13:26
33rd	23 April 1978	Takeshi So (JPN)	2:15:15
32nd	17 April 1977	Karel Lismont (BEL)	2:14:08
31st	18 April 1976	Akio Usami (JPN)	2:15:22
30th	20 April 1975	Akio Usami (JPN)	2:12:40
29th	21 April 1974	Akio Usami (JPN)	2:13:24
28th	18 March 1973	Frank Shorter (USA)	2:12:03
27th	19 March 1972	Akio Usami (JPN)	2:20:24
26th	21 March 1971	Yoshiaki Unetani (JPN)	2:16:45.4
25th	12 April 1970	Bill Adcocks (GBR)	2:13:46
24th	11 May 1969	Kazuo Matsubara (JPN)	2:22:44
23rd	14 April 1968	Akio Usami (JPN)	2:13:49
22nd	14 May 1967	Yoshiro Mifune (JPN)	2:25:53
21st	5 June 1966	Yoshiro Mifune (JPN)	2:26:01.6
20th	9 May 1965	Abebe Bikila (ETH)	2:22:55.8
19th	12 April 1964	Kenji Kimihara (JPN)	2:17:11.4
18th	12 May 1963	Kenji Kimihara (JPN)	2:20:24.8
17th	13 May 1962	Masayuki Nagata (JPN)	2:27:37
16th	25 June 1961	Abebe Bikila (ETH)	2:29:27
15th	15 May 1960	Nobuyoshi Sadanaga (JPN)	2:34:57
14th	10 May 1959	Kurao Hiroshima (JPN)	2:30:06
13th	11 May 1958	Takayuki Nakao (JPN)	2:25:51
12th	3 May 1957	Kurao Hiroshima (JPN)	2:31:20
11th	6 May 1956	Yoshiaki Kawashima (JPN)	2:27:45
10th	8 May 1955	Kurao Hiroshima (JPN)	2:26:32
9th	16 May 1954	Hideo Hamamura (JPN)	2:27:56
8th	10 May 1953	Hiroshi Uwa (JPN)	2:41:28
7th	4 May 1952	Yoshitaka Uchikawa (JPN)	2:29:54.4
6th	6 May 1951	Tadashi Asai (JPN)	2:32:41
5th	7 May 1950	Giichi Noda (JPN)	2:37:25
4th	4 May 1949	Saburō Yamada (JPN)	2:40:32
3rd	9 May 1948	Shinzō Koga (JPN)	2:40:05
2nd	18 May 1947	Shinzō Koga (JPN)	2:43:17
1st	10 February 1946	Shinzō Koga (JPN)	2:44:57

== Statistics ==
=== Winners by country ===
Country	Total wins
Japan	44
Kenya	11
Spain	6
Ethiopia	4
Belgium	2
Ireland	2
Tanzania	2
Portugal	1
Qatar	1
United States	1
United Kingdom	1

=== Multiple winners ===
Athlete	Country	Wins	Years
Akio Usami	Japan	5	1968, 1972, 1974–76
Shinzō Koga	Japan	3	1946–1948
Kurao Hiroshima	Japan	3	1955, 1957, 1959
Martín Fiz	Spain	3	1997, 1999, 2000
Abebe Bikila	Ethiopia	2	1961, 1965
Kenji Kimihara	Japan	2	1963, 1964
Yoshiro Mifune	Japan	2	1966, 1967
Fumiaki Abe	Japan	2	1985, 1987
Mike O'Reilly	United Kingdom	2	1992, 1993
José Ríos	Spain	2	2004, 2006
Samuel Ndungu	Kenya	2	2012, 2015

== Qualifications ==
The runners needed to meet both of the following requirements, or have a special recommendation from the JAAF, to enter the competition. 1, The runner must be at least 19 years old on the day of competition. 2, The runner should have achieved one of the following time within two years from the date of the competition.

- (1)Marathon: 2 hours 30 minutes or less
- (2)Half Marathon: 1 hour 10 minutes or less
- (3)30km: 1 hour 40 minutes or less
- (4)20km: 1 hour 5 minutes or less
- (5)10000m: 31 minutes or less
