= 1988 European Marathon Cup =

1988 Marathon competition held in Huy, Belgium

The 1988 European Marathon Cup was the fourth edition of the quadrennial team marathon competition between European countries, which was held in Huy, Belgium on 30 April.

== Results ==
Team men
#	Nations	Points
1	Soviet Union	31
2	France	54
3	Belgium	66

Team women
#	Nations	Points
1	Soviet Union	14
2	France	52
3	East Germany	54

== Individual men ==
Rank	Athlete	Nation	Time
1st place, gold medalist(s)	Ravil Kashapov	Soviet Union (URS)	2:11:30
2nd place, silver medalist(s)	Alessio Faustini	Italy (ITA)	2:11:52
3rd place, bronze medalist(s)	Alain Lazare	France (FRA)	2:12:24
4	Nikolay Tabak	Soviet Union (URS)	2:12:33
5	Alexandre Gonzalez	France (FRA)	2:12:52
6	Honorato Hernández	Spain (ESP)	2:13:17
7	Alfonso Abellán	Spain (ESP)	2:13:25
8	Dirk Vanderherten	Belgium (BEL)	2:13:33
9	Yakov Tolstikov	Soviet Union (URS)	2:14:10
10	Michael Heilmann	East Germany (GDR)	2:14:18
11	Jerzy Skarżyński	Poland (POL)	2:14:52
12	William Van Huylenbroek	Belgium (BEL)	2:15:11
13	Tadeusz Lawicki	Poland (POL)	2:15:13
14	Werner Grommisch	West Germany (FRG)	2:15:55
15	Jörg Peter	East Germany (GDR)	2:15:56
16	Jean-Jacques Padel	France (FRA)	2:16:21
17	Sergey Rozum	Soviet Union (URS)	2:16:43
18	Jozef Gees	Belgium (BEL)	2:16:46
19	Maurizio Lorenzetti	Italy (ITA)	2:16:55
20	Ryszard Misiewicz	Poland (POL)	2:17:03
21	Uwe Koch	East Germany (GDR)	2:17:08
22	Viktor Mosgovoy	Soviet Union (URS)	2:17:35
23	Leandro Croce	Italy (ITA)	2:18:20
24	Jose-Esteban Montiel	Spain (ESP)	2:18:36
25	Ian Bloomfield	Great Britain (GBR)	2:18:38
26	James Doig	Great Britain (GBR)	2:18:45
27	Martin Grüning	West Germany (FRG)	2:18:50
28	Cor Saelmans	Belgium (BEL)	2:18:59
29	Calum Bark	Great Britain (GBR)	2:19:19
30	Jacques Marechet	France (FRA)	2:19:24
31	Rosario LoPresti	Italy (ITA)	2:19:26
32	Jean-Pierre Paumen	Belgium (BEL)	2:19:46
33	Boguslaw Psujek	Poland (POL)	2:20:31
34	Edward Rydzewski	Poland (POL)	2:20:49
35	Marco Milani	Italy (ITA)	2:20:56
36	Daniel Duprix	Belgium (BEL)	2:20:59
37	Bernard Bobes	France (FRA)	2:21:04
38	Colin Moore	Great Britain (GBR)	2:21:06
39	Christos Papachristos	Greece (GRE)	2:21:50
40	Jean-Baptiste Protais	France (FRA)	2:22:53
42	Stephan Freigang	East Germany (GDR)	2:24:19
44	John Griffin	Ireland (IRL)	2:25:21
45	Stefan Paul	West Germany (FRG)	2:25:25
46	Aydin Ceken	Turkey (TUR)	2:26:45
48	Fotios Bourkoulas	Greece (GRE)	2:27:48
—	Giuseppe Miccoli	Italy (ITA)	DNF

== Individual women ==
Rank	Athlete	Nation	Time
1st place, gold medalist(s)	Katrin Dörre	East Germany (GDR)	2:28:28
2nd place, silver medalist(s)	Raisa Smekhnova	Soviet Union (URS)	2:28:40
3rd place, bronze medalist(s)	Zoya Ivanova	Soviet Union (URS)	2:29:37
4	Yekaterina Khramenkova	Soviet Union (URS)	2:32:04
5	Yelena Tsukhlo	Soviet Union (URS)	2:32:48
6	Maria Rebelo	France (FRA)	2:33:16
7	Françoise Bonnet	France (FRA)	2:33:32
8	Renata Kokowska	Poland (POL)	2:34:41
9	Annette Fincke	East Germany (GDR)	2:34:59
10	Jeannette Hein	East Germany (GDR)	2:35:06
11	Magda Ilands	Belgium (BEL)	2:35:36
12	Emma Scaunich	Italy (ITA)	2:36:31
13	Antonella Bizioli	Italy (ITA)	2:36:38
14	Sylviane Levesque	France (FRA)	2:36:59
15	Małgorzata Birbach	Poland (POL)	2:37:36
16	Ewa Szydlowska	Poland (POL)	2:37:39
17	Ria Van Landeghem	Belgium (BEL)	2:37:55
18	Anne Roden	Great Britain (GBR)	2:38:54
19	Irina Bogacheva	Soviet Union (URS)	2:40:11
20	Bettina Sabatini	Italy (ITA)	2:40:33
21	Maria-Luisa Irizar	Spain (ESP)	2:40:45
22	Marina Prat	Spain (ESP)	2:41:37
23	Renata Walendziak	Poland (POL)	2:42:08
24	Rossella di Dionisio	Italy (ITA)	2:42:33
25	Odile Poirot	France (FRA)	2:43:11
26	Nelly Aerts	Belgium (BEL)	2:44:22
27	Ewa Wrzosek	Poland (POL)	2:45:18
28	Jocelyne Villeton	France (FRA)	2:45:55
29	Krystyna Chylińska	Poland (POL)	2:46:11
30	Carmen Mingorance	Spain (ESP)	2:46:27
31	Gerrie Timmermans	Netherlands (NED)	2:46:42
32	Viviene Van Buggenhout	Belgium (BEL)	2:48:20
33	Eryl Davies	Great Britain (GBR)	2:48:44
34	Birgit Stephan	East Germany (GDR)	2:49:32
35	Christine Van Put	Belgium (BEL)	2:50:36
36	Elena Cobos	Spain (ESP)	2:51:07
37	Cassandra Mihailovic	France (FRA)	2:53:06
38	Bronwen Cardy	Great Britain (GBR)	2:55:12
39	Deborah Heath	Great Britain (GBR)	2:56:12
40	Leslie Watson	Great Britain (GBR)	3:02:46
—	Silvana Cucchietti	Italy (ITA)	DNF
—	Rita Marchisio	Italy (ITA)	DNF
