= European Marathon Cup =

Quadrennial team footrace

- Status: active
- Genre: Road running competitions
- Date: August
- Frequency: quadrennial
- Location: various
- Inaugurated: 1981
- Organiser: EAA

The European Marathon Cup is a quadrennial team marathon competition between European countries.

Initially a stand-alone championship race inaugurated in 1981, the race has been held in conjunction with the European Athletics Championships since 1994. Individual medallists are included in the European Championships medal table, while until 2026 team medals are awarded separately from the main championships.

In 2026 the Marathon Cup results were included in the overall medal table for the 2026 European Athletics Championships as the 'Marathon team' events for the first time.

Each national team may enter six runner and the team score is the sum of the times of the team's three fastest finishers. The IAAF World Marathon Cup (first held in 1985) follows a similar format.

The event alternates biennially with the European Half Marathon Cup which is contested under similar rules when the European Athletics Championships are held in Olympic years

== Editions ==
Edition	Year	Host country	Host city	Date	Notes
1st	1981	France	Agen	13 September	
2nd	1983	Spain	Laredo	19 June	
3rd	1985	Italy	Rome	15 September	
4th	1988	Belgium	Huy	30 April	
5th	1994	Finland	Helsinki	7, 14 August	
6th	1998	Hungary	Budapest	22–23 August	
7th	2002	Germany	Munich	10–11 August	
8th	2006	Sweden	Gothenburg	12–13 August	
9th	2010	Spain	Barcelona	31 July–1 August	
10th	2014	Finland	Helsinki	17 August	
11th	2018	Germany	Berlin	12 August	
12th	2022	Germany	Munich	15 August	
13th	2026	Great Britain	Birmingham	16 August	

== Rules ==
Each country can deploy a single team with a maximum of six athletes, the total time is scored on the time of the first three classified, but the other athletes of the team that finished the race will be also awarded with the medal.

== Medallists ==
=== Men ===
Year	Gold	Silver	Bronze
1981	Italy 30 pt 1. Massimo Magnani; 8. Giampaolo Messina; 9. Gianni Poli; 12. Armando Scozzari	Soviet Union 72 pt	Poland 80 pt
1983	East Germany 22 pt 1. Waldemar Cierpinski; 2. Jürgen Eberding	Italy 28 pt 3. Gianni Poli; 4. Marco Marchei; 8. Giampaolo Messina; 13. Antonio Erotavo	Spain 45 pt
1985	East Germany 32 pt 1. Michael Heilmann; 3. Jörg Peter	France 36 pt 2. Jacques Lefrand	Italy 38 pt 4. Alessio Faustini; 7. Gelindo Bordin; 13. Aldo Fantoni; 14. Loris Pimazzoni
1988	Soviet Union; 1. Ravil Kashapov	France; 3. Alain Lazare	Belgium
1994	Spain; 1. Martín Fiz; 2. Diego García; 3. Alberto Juzdado	Portugal; 6. António Rodrigues; 7. Manuel Matias; 9. António Pinto	France; 10. Dominique Chauvelier; 11. Noureddine Sobhi; 18. Bruno Le Stum
1998	Italy; 1. Stefano Baldini; 2. Danilo Goffi; 3. Vincenzo Modica; 7. Giovanni Ruggiero; 20. Ottaviano Andriani	Spain; 4. Julio Rey; 5. Alejandro Gómez; 6. Antoni Peña	Portugal; 9. João Lopes; 10. António Salvador; 15. Paulo Catarino
2002	Spain; 3. Julio Rey; 5. Alberto Juzdado; 6. Alejandro Gómez	Italy; 4. Daniele Caimmi; 10. Migidio Bourifa; 12. Alberico di Cecco; 13. Danilo Goffi; 19. Ottaviano Andriani; 21. Sergio Chiesa	Portugal; 23. José Santos; 27. Manuel Pita; 29. António Sousa
2006	Italy; 1. Stefano Baldini; 5. Francesco Ingargiola; 11. Danilo Goffi	Portugal; 8. Alberto Chaíça; 10. Luís Jesus; 15. Hélder Ornelas	Russia; 6. Dmitriy Semyonov; 13. Dmitriy Burmakin; 17. Grigoriy Andreyev
2010	Spain; 2. José Manuel Martínez; 5. Pablo Villalobos; 6. Rafael Iglesias	Russia; 3. Dmitriy Safronov; 9. Aleksey Sokolov; 15. Oleg Kulkov	Italy; 4. Ruggero Pertile; 7. Migidio Bourifa; 11. Ottaviano Andriani; 31. Daniele Caimmi
2014	Russia; Aleksey Reunkov; Stepan Kiselev; Sergey Rybin; Aleksey Sokolov	France	Switzerland
2018	Italy; 3. Yassine Rachik; 5. Eyob Faniel; 12. Stefano La Rosa	Spain; 4. Javier Guerra; 6. Jesus Espana; 16. Camilo Raul Santiago; 22. Petro Nimo; 34. Iraitz Arrospide	Austria; 8. Lamawork Ketema; 10. Peter Herzog; 41. Christian Steinhammer
2022	Israel; Marhu Teferi; Gashau Ayale; Yimer Getahun; Girmaw Amare; Omer Ramon; Bukayawe Malede	Germany; Richard Ringer; Amanal Petros; Johannes Motschmann; Hendrik Pfeiffer; Konstantin Wedel; Simon Boch	Spain; Ayad Lamdassem; Jorge Blanco; Daniel Mateo; Yago Rojo; Abdelaziz Merzougui
2026	Israel; Gashau Ayale (3); Tadesse Getahon (5); Haimro Alame (8); Yitayew Abuhay (12); Maru Teferi (22); Bukayawe Malede (35)	Germany; Amanal Petros (1); Samuel Fitwi Sibhatu (9); Richard Ringer (10); Simon Boch (21); Erik Hille (28); Tom Thurley (37)	France; Valentin Gondouin (6); Emmanuel Roudolff Levisse (11); Hassan Chahdi (19); Felix Bour (DNF)

=== Women ===
Year	Gold	Silver	Bronze
1985	East Germany; 1. Katrin Dörre; 2. Gabriele Martins; 3. Birgit Weinhold	Italy; 6. Laura Fogli; 7. Emma Scaunich; 9. Rita Marchisio	Soviet Union
1988	Soviet Union; 2. Raisa Smekhnova; 3. Zoya Ivanova	France	East Germany; 1. Katrin Dörre
1994	Italy; 2. Maria Curatolo; 4. Ornella Ferrara; 8. Rosanna Munerotto; 9. Anna Villani; 21. Bettina Sabatini; DNF Laura Fogli	Romania	France
1998	Russia; 2. Madina Biktagirova; 7. Lyubov Morgunova; 8. Yelena Razdrogina; 9. Lyudmila Petrova; 18. Irina Timofeyeva	Italy; 3. Maura Viceconte; 4. Franca Fiacconi; 19. Gigliola Borghini; 24. Francesca Zanusso; 30. Paola Vignati; DNF Patrizia Ritondo	Germany
2002	Germany	Russia	Only two teams entered
2006	Italy; 5. Bruna Genovese; 7. Deborah Toniolo; 8. Giovanna Volpato; 9. Anna Incerti; 21. Marcella Mancini; DNF Rosaria Console	Russia	Germany
2010	Russia; 2. Nailya Yulamanova; 9. Irina Timofeyeva; 11. Silviya Skvortsova; 28. Yevgeniya Danilova; 29. Margarita Plaksina; DNF Tatyana Pushkareva	Italy; 3. Anna Incerti; 8. Rosaria Console; 10. Deborah Toniolo	Great Britain; 14. Michelle Ross-Cope; 16. Susan Partridge; 20. Holly Rush; 21. Helen Decker; 24. Rebecca Robinson; 25. Jo Wilkinson
2014	Italy; Valeria Straneo; Anna Incerti; Nadia Ejjafini; Emma Quaglia; Deborah Toniolo; Rosaria Console	Portugal; Jessica Augusto; Filomena Costa; Marisa Barros	Russia; Natalya Puchkova; Albina Mayorova; Gulnara Vygovskaya
2018	Belarus; Volha Mazuronak; Maryna Damantsevich; Nastassia Ivanova; Nina Savina; Iryna Somava	(Italy) Italy; Sara Dossena; Catherine Bertone; Fatna Maraoui; Laura Gotti	Spain; Trihas Gebre; Maria Azucena Diaz; Elena Loyo; Marta Galimany; Clara Simal
2022	Germany; Miriam Dattke; Domenika Mayer; Deborah Schöneborn; Rabea Schöneborn; Katharina Steinruck; Kristina Hendel	Spain; Marta Galimany; Irene Pelayo; Elena Loyo; Laura Méndez Esquer	Poland; Aleksandra Lisowska; Angelika Mach; Monika Jackiewicz; Izabela Paszkiewicz; Katarzyna Jankowska
2026	Great Britain; Abbie Donnelly; Natasha Wilson; Rose Harvey; Louise Small; Clara Evans-Graham	Italy; Rebecca Lonedo; Sofiia Yaremchuk; Giovanna Epis; Alessia Tuccitto	Spain; Carolina Robles; Fatima Ouhaddou; Ester Navarrete; Meritxell Soler

== All-time medal table ==
Rank	Nation	Gold	Silver	Bronze	Total
1	Italy (ITA)	7	7	2	16
2	Spain (ESP)	3	3	4	10
3	Russia (RUS)	3	3	2	8
4	East Germany	3	0	1	4
5	Germany (GER)	2	2	2	6
6	Soviet Union	2	1	1	4
7	Israel (ISR)	2	0	0	2
8	Great Britain (GBR)	1	0	1	2
9	Belarus (BLR)	1	0	0	1
10	France (FRA)	0	4	3	7
11	Portugal (POR)	0	3	2	5
12	Romania (ROM)	0	1	0	1
13	Poland (POL)	0	0	2	2
14	Austria (AUT)	0	0	1	1
14	Belgium (BEL)	0	0	1	1
14	Switzerland (SUI)	0	0	1	1
Totals (16 entries)		24	24	23	71

== See also ==
- IAAF World Marathon Cup
