= 1985 European Marathon Cup =

1985 Marathon competition held in Rome, Italy

The 1985 European Marathon Cup was the third edition of the European Marathon Cup of Athletics and were held in Rome, Italy.

== Team ==
Team men
#	Nations	Points
1	East Germany	32
2	France	36
3	Italy	38

Team women
#	Nations	Time
1	East Germany	7:36:10
2	Italy	7:48:50
3	Soviet Union	7:48:53

== Individual men ==
Rank	Athlete	Nation	Time
1	Michael Heilmann	East Germany (GDR)	2:11:28
2	Jacques LeFrand	France (FRA)	2:14:16
3	Jörg Peter	East Germany (GDR)	2:14:27
4	Alessio Faustini	Italy (ITA)	2:14:30
5	Cidálio Caetano	Portugal (POR)	2:15:03
6	Alexandre Gonzalez	France (FRA)	2:15:09
7	Gelindo Bordin	Italy (ITA)	2:15:13
8	Jean-Yves Madelon	France (FRA)	2:15:47
9	Czeslaw Wilczewski	Poland (POL)	2:15:51
10	Ieuan Ellis	Great Britain (GBR)	2:15:56
11	Jürgen Eberding	East Germany (GDR)	2:16:04
12	Elisio Rios	Portugal (POR)	2:16:13
13	Aldo Fantoni	Italy (ITA)	2:16:29
14	Loris Pimazzoni	Italy (ITA)	2:16:38
15	Gaspar Esnaolo	Spain (ESP)	2:16:54
16	Osvaldo Faustini	Italy (ITA)	2:16:59
17	Hartmut Tronnier	East Germany (GDR)	2:17:14
18	Giuseppe Denti	Italy (ITA)	2:17:19
19	John-Andrew Boyes	Great Britain (GBR)	2:17:29
20	Patrick Joannes	France (FRA)	2:17:31
21	Stavros Karakatsanis	Greece (GRE)	2:17:39
22	Pawel Lorens	Poland (POL)	2:17:41
23	Lindsay Robertson	Great Britain (GBR)	2:17:43
24	Jerzy Skarżyński	Poland (POL)	2:18:07
25	Alfonso Abellán	Spain (ESP)	2:18:10
26	Michel Lelut	France (FRA)	2:18:14
27	Santiago de la Parte	Spain (ESP)	2:18:26
28	Mehmet Yurdadön	Turkey (TUR)	2:18:34
29	Per-Olaf Holmnas	Finland (FIN)	2:18:37
30	John Griffin	Ireland (IRL)	2:18:48
31	Ahmet Altun	Turkey (TUR)	2:18:53
32	Vicente Anton	Spain (ESP)	2:18:55
33	Andrew Girling	Great Britain (GBR)	2:19:45
34	Richard Vollenbroek	Netherlands (NED)	2:19:53
35	Jose Reveyn	Belgium (BEL)	2:20:07
36	Petko Karpachev	Bulgaria (BUL)	2:20:14
39	Stanimir Nenov	Bulgaria (BUL)	2:20:56
42	Veselin Vasilev	Bulgaria (BUL)	2:21:24
55	Vasil Lechev	Bulgaria (BUL)	2:27:12
70	Luciano Acquarone	Italy (ITA)	2:36:39

== Individual women ==
Rank	Athlete	Nation	Time
1	Katrin Dörre	East Germany (GDR)	2:30:11
2	Gabriele Riemann	East Germany (GDR)	2:32:23
3	Birgit Stephan	East Germany (GDR)	2:33:36
4	Nadezhda Usmanova	Soviet Union (URS)	2:33:57
5	Sinikka Keskitalo	Finland (FIN)	2:34:28
6	Laura Fogli	Italy (ITA)	2:35:06
7	Emma Scaunich	Italy (ITA)	2:36:46
8	Yekaterina Khramenkova	Soviet Union (URS)	2:36:49
9	Rita Marchisio	Italy (ITA)	2:36:58
10	Valentina Ustinova	Soviet Union (URS)	2:38:07
11	Sirkku Kumpulainen	Finland (FIN)	2:38:44
12	Mercedes Calleja	Spain (ESP)	2:39:20
13	Nadezhda Gumerova	Soviet Union (URS)	2:39:32
14	Maria-Luisa Irizar	Spain (ESP)	2:39:42
15	Maija Vuorinen	Finland (FIN)	2:40:04
16	Annette Roberts	Great Britain (GBR)	2:41:37
17	Grazyna Mierzejewska	Poland (POL)	2:43:31
18	Ritva Lemettinen	Finland (FIN)	2:43:31
19	Irina Ruban	Soviet Union (URS)	2:43:32
20	Paola Moro	Italy (ITA)	2:43:59
21	Mia Pauwels	Belgium (BEL)	2:44:12
22	Stefania Colombo	Italy (ITA)	2:44:54
23	Renata Walendziak	Poland (POL)	2:45:22
24	Carolyn Horne	Great Britain (GBR)	2:46:16
25	Luzia Sahli	Switzerland (SUI)	2:46:38
26	Genoveva Eichenmann	Switzerland (SUI)	2:48:52
27	Consuelo Alonso	Spain (ESP)	2:49:25
28	Czeslawa Mentlewicz	Poland (POL)	2:50:12
29	Malgorzata Szuminska	Poland (POL)	2:50:16
