= IAAF World Marathon Cup =

Athletics event

The IAAF World Marathon Cup was an international event organised by the International Association of Athletics Federations every two years.

From 1997 until 2011 (its final year) it was incorporated with IAAF World Championships in Athletics. The competition is defunct, Daegu 2011 was the last edition.

== Editions ==
Year	Venue	Country	Date
1985	Hiroshima	Japan	13–14 April
1987	Seoul	South Korea	11–12 April
1989	Milan	Italy	15–16 April
1991	London	United Kingdom	21 April
1993	San Sebastián	Spain	31 October
1995	Athens	Greece	9 April
1997	Athens	Greece	9–10 August
1999	Seville	Spain	28–29 August
2001	Edmonton	Canada	3–12 August
2003	Paris	France	30–31 August
2005	Helsinki	Finland	13–14 August
2007	Osaka	Japan	25 August & 2 September
2009	Berlin	Germany	22–23 August
2011	Daegu	South Korea	27 August & 4 September

== Medalists ==
=== Men ===
Year	Gold		Silver		Bronze	
1985	Djibouti; Hussein Ahmed Salah; Djama Robleh; Omar Abdillahi Charmarke	6:27:08	Japan; Takeyuki Nakayama; Takeshi So; Shigeru So	6:31:43	Ethiopia; Abebe Mekonnen; Kebede Balcha; Dereje Nedi	6:32:46
1987	Italy; 3. Salvatore Bettiol; 4. Salvatore Nicosia; 5. Osvaldo Faustini	6:36:38	Japan; Taisuke Kodama; Kazuyoshi Kudo; Yoshihiro Nishimura	6:39:23	France; Alain Lazare; Jacques Marechet; Alexandre Gonzalez	6:43:46
1989	Ethiopia; Metaferia Zeleke; Dereje Nedi; Wami Alemayehu	6:37:20	Italy; 3. Gianni Poli; 7. Salvatore Bettiol; 14. Osvaldo Faustini	6:37:51	France; Dominique Chauvelier; Bertrand Itsweire; Alexandre Gonzalez	6:38:51
1991	United Kingdom; David Long; Stephen Brace; David Buzza	6:34:59	Portugal; Manuel Matias; Joaquim Pinheiro; Antonio Godinho	6:35:55	Poland; Jan Huruk; Sławomir Gurny; Wiesław Perszke	6:36:12
1993	Ethiopia; Gemechu Kebede; Becho Tadesse; Tumo Turbo	6:31:17	Italy; 2. Severino Bernardini; 8. Luca Barzaghi; 13. Walter Durbano	6:32:41	United Kingdom; Richard Nerurkar; David Buzza; Andrew Green	6:34:06
1995	Italy; 3. Davide Milesi; 6. Marco Gozzano; 7. Roberto Crosio	6:43:42	France; Jean-Marie Gehin; Dominique Chauvelier; Pascal Fetizon	6:48:47	Spain; José Ramón Torres; Bartolomé Serrano ?	6:51:05
1997	Spain; Abel Antón; Martín Fiz; Fabián Roncero	6:43:30	Italy; 4. Danilo Goffi; 6. Giacomo Leone; 30. Francesco Ingargiola	6:55:33	Brazil; Luíz Antônio dos Santos; Vanderlei de Lima; Osmiro Silva	7:02:56
1999	Italy; 2. Vincenzo Modica; 5. Danilo Goffi; 10. Daniele Caimmi	6:45:16	Japan	6:45:42	Ethiopia	6:50:11
2001	Ethiopia	6:43:32	Japan	6:48:36	Italy; 3. Stefano Baldini; 11. Giacomo Leone; 17. Alberico Di Cecco	6:51:56
2003	Japan	6:30:43	Italy; 3. Stefano Baldini; 6. Daniele Caimmi; 22. Alberico Di Cecco	6:32:19	South Africa	6:35:54
2005	Japan	6:38:39	Kenya	6:46:38	Ethiopia	6:52:14
2007	Japan	6:54:23	South Korea	7:12:08	Kenya	7:12:33
2009	Kenya	6:25:28	Ethiopia	6:32:06	Japan	6:41:05
2011	Kenya	6:29:23	Japan	6:41:13	Morocco	6:42:18

=== Women ===
Year	Gold		Silver		Bronze	
1985	Italy; 4. Laura Fogli; 6. Rita Marchisio; 11. Emma Scaunich	7:51:27	Soviet Union; 2. Zoya Ivanova; 10. Raisa Smekhnova; Nadia Ushanova	7:53:22	East Germany; 1. Katrin Dörre; 19. Birgit Weinhold; 22. Gabriele Martins	8:00:02
1987	Soviet Union; Zoya Ivanova; Tatyana Gridnyeva; Yekaterina Khramenkova	7:34:39	East Germany; Katrin Dörre; Uta Pippig; Annette Fincke	7:42:10	France; Maria Rebelo; Françoise Bonnet; Jocelyne Villeton	7:46:41
1989	Soviet Union; Yekaterina Khramenkova; Irina Yagodina; Valentina Yegorova	7:51:29	United States; Susan Marchiano; Gordon Bakoulis; Charlotte Thomas	7:56:17	China; Li Juan; Li Yemei; Xie Lihua	7:57:07
1991	Soviet Union; Valentina Yegorova; Ramilya Burangulova; Tatyana Zuyeva	7:30:21	Italy; 10. Anna Villani; 11. Antonella Bizioli; 13. Laura Fogli	7:36:37	France; Maria Rebelo; Françoise Bonnet; Marie-Helene Ohier	7:38:51
1993	China; Wang Junxia; Zhang Linli; Zhang Lirong	7:27:43	Spain; Maria-Luisa Muñoz; Monica Pont; Rocio Rios	7:33:55	Russia; Firiya Sultanova; Olga Michurina; Tatyana Pentukova	7:44:07
1995	Romania; Anuța Catuna; Lidia Șimon; Cristina Pomacu	7:35:05	Russia; Larisa Zyusko; Nadezhda Wijenberg; Marina Belyayeva	7:47:39	Italy; 4. Ornella Ferrara; 15. Maura Viceconte; 16. Antonella Bizioli	7:50:46
1997	Japan; Hiromi Suzuki; Takako Tobise; Nobuko Fujimura	7:38:57	Romania; Lidia Șimon; Anuța Cătună; Aurica Buia	7:52:18	Italy; 3. Ornella Ferrara; 13. Franca Fiacconi; 24. Laura Fogli	7:56:31
1999	Japan	7:27:52	Romania	7:34:37	Germany	7:35:41
2001	Japan	7:22:36	Russia	7:26:00	Romania	7:29:44
2003	Japan	7:14:48	Ethiopia	7:24:56	Russia	7:31:04
2005	Kenya	7:12:37	Japan	7:16:35	United Kingdom	7:27:04
2007	Kenya	7:35:02	China	7:35:52	Japan	7:37:39
2009	China	7:17:02	Japan	7:22:15	Russia	7:24:42
2011	Kenya	7:26:57	China	7:31:34	Ethiopia	7:32:20

== Medal table ==
Men

Rank	Nation	Gold	Silver	Bronze	Total
1	Japan (JPN)	3	5	1	9
2	Italy (ITA)	3	4	1	8
3	Ethiopia (ETH)	3	1	3	7
4	Kenya (KEN)	2	1	1	4
5	Great Britain (GBR)	1	0	1	2
5	Spain (ESP)	1	0	1	2
7	Djibouti (DJI)	1	0	0	1
8	France (FRA)	0	1	2	3
9	Portugal (POR)	0	1	0	1
9	South Korea (KOR)	0	1	0	1
11	Brazil (BRA)	0	0	1	1
11	Morocco (MAR)	0	0	1	1
11	Poland (POL)	0	0	1	1
11	South Africa (RSA)	0	0	1	1
Totals (14 entries)		14	14	14	42

Women

Rank	Nation	Gold	Silver	Bronze	Total
1	Japan (JPN)	4	2	1	7
2	Soviet Union (URS)	3	1	0	4
3	Kenya (KEN)	3	0	0	3
4	China (CHN)	2	2	1	5
5	Romania (ROM)	1	2	1	4
6	Italy (ITA)	1	1	2	4
7	Russia (RUS)	0	2	3	5
8	East Germany (GDR)	0	1	1	2
8	Ethiopia (ETH)	0	1	1	2
10	Spain (ESP)	0	1	0	1
10	United States (USA)	0	1	0	1
12	France (FRA)	0	0	2	2
13	Germany (GER)	0	0	1	1
13	Great Britain (GBR)	0	0	1	1
Totals (14 entries)		14	14	14	42

== See also ==
- IAAF Continental Cup
- European Marathon Cup
