= 1987 World Marathon Cup =

World Marathon Cup in Seoul

The 1987 World Marathon Cup was the second edition of the World Marathon Cup of athletics and were held in Seoul, South Korea on 12 April.

== Results ==
Team men
#	Nations	Time
1	Italy; Salvatore Bettiol; Salvatore Nicosia; Osvaldo Faustini	6:36:38
2	Japan; Taisuke Kodama; Kazuyoshi Kudo; Yoshihiro Nishimura	6:39:23
3	France; Alain Lazare; Jacques Marechet; Alexandre Gonzalez	6:43:46

Team women
#	Nations	Time
1	Soviet Union; Zoya Ivanova; Tatyana Gridnyeva; Yekaterina Khramenkova	7:34:39
2	East Germany; Katrin Dörre; Uta Pippig; Annette Fincke	7:42:10
3	France; Maria Rebelo; Françoise Bonnet; Jocelyne Villeton	7:46:41

=== Individual men ===
Rank	Athlete	Country	Time (h:m:s)
1	Hussein Ahmed Saleh	Djibouti (DJI)	2:10:55
2	Taisuke Kodama	Japan (JPN)	2:11:23
3	Salvatore Bettiol	Italy (ITA)	2:11:28
4	Salvatore Nicosia	Italy (ITA)	2:12:13
5	Osvaldo Faustini	Italy (ITA)	2:12:57
6	Sid-Ali Sakhri	Algeria (ALG)	2:13:29
7	Kazuyoshi Kudo	Japan (JPN)	2:13:34
8	Honorato Hernandez	Spain (ESP)	2:13:40
9	Alain Lazare	France (FRA)	2:13:43
10	Jacques Marechet	France (FRA)	2:13:47
11	Mirko Vindis	Yugoslavia (YUG)	2:13:47
12	Spyridon Andriopoulos	Greece (GRE)	2:14:19
13	Yoshihiro Nishimura	Japan (JPN)	2:14:26
14	John Vermeule	Netherlands (NED)	2:14:32
15	Thomas Ratcliffe	United States (USA)	2:14:44
16	Michael Heilmann	East Germany (GDR)	2:14:51
17	Aldo Fantoni	Italy (ITA)	2:14:54
18	Jürgen Eberding	East Germany (GDR)	2:14:59
19	Alfonso Abellan	Spain (ESP)	2:15:03
20	David Long	Great Britain (GBR)	2:15:04
21	Juan-Antonio Balsera	Spain (ESP)	2:15:06
22	Lindsay Robertson	Great Britain (GBR)	2:15:07
23	Christos Papachristos	Greece (GRE)	2:15:22
24	Peter Lyrenmann	Switzerland (SUI)	2:15:30
25	Hugo Rey	Switzerland (SUI)	2:15:30
26	Paul Herlihy	New Zealand (NZL)	2:15:51
27	Anastassios Psathas	Greece (GRE)	2:15:53
28	Brad Hawthorne	United States (USA)	2:15:57
29	Peter Gschwend	Switzerland (SUI)	2:15:57
30	Janos Papp	Hungary (HUN)	2:16:00
31	Alexandre Gonzalez	France (FRA)	2:16:16
32	Veselin Vasilev	Bulgaria (BUL)	2:16:18
33	Lee Chun-keun	South Korea (KOR)	2:16:19
34	Peter Dall	Denmark (DEN)	2:16:21
35	Thomas Eickmann	West Germany (FRG)	2:16:26
36	Hans Pfisterer	West Germany (FRG)	2:16:28
37	Justin Gloden	Luxembourg (LUX)	2:16:39
38	Stanimir Nenov	Bulgaria (BUL)	2:17:00
39	Gideon Buthana	Eswatini (SWZ)	2:17:08
40	Loris Pimazzoni	Italy (ITA)	2:17:12
41	Zoltan Kiss	Hungary (HUN)	2:17:21
42	Stephan Seidemann	East Germany (GDR)	2:17:34
43	Graham Macky	New Zealand (NZL)	2:17:35
44	Kim Reijnierse	Netherlands (NED)	2:17:37
45	Patrick Carroll	Australia (AUS)	2:17:39
46	Paul Pieters	Belgium (BEL)	2:17:41
47	Fraser Clyne	Great Britain (GBR)	2:17:43
48	Osmiro da Silva	Brazil (BRA)	2:17:48
49	Dragan Isailovic	Yugoslavia (YUG)	2:17:49
50	Peter Mitchell	Australia (AUS)	2:18:02
51	Andy Jones	Canada (CAN)	2:18:15
52	Semir Berber	Turkey (TUR)	2:18:22
53	Hanifi Atmaca	Turkey (TUR)	2:18:24
54	Derek Froude	New Zealand (NZL)	2:18:28
55	Richard Vollenbroek	Netherlands (NED)	2:18:32
56	Johan Geirnaert	Belgium (BEL)	2:18:40
57	Richard Mannen	Canada (CAN)	2:19:00
58	Steven Poulton	Australia (AUS)	2:19:22
59	Manuel de Oliviera	Portugal (POR)	2:19:40
60	Marc Agosta	Luxembourg (LUX)	2:19:44
61	Farid Belhmadi	Algeria (ALG)	2:19:51
62	Pierre Levisse	France (FRA)	2:19:59
66	Bigboy Matlapeng	Botswana (BOT)	2:20:48
79	Angel Zanev	Bulgaria (BUL)	2:23:24
86	Fernando Zuluaga	Spain (ESP)	2:24:23
87	Frank Plasso	United States (USA)	2:24:30
91	Colin Neave	Australia (AUS)	2:25:16
100	Daniel Gonzalez	United States (USA)	2:27:11
101	Youssef Doukal	Djibouti (DJI)	2:27:14
109	John Guerin	Australia (AUS)	2:29:06
116	Thomas Dlamini	Eswatini (SWZ)	2:30:39
—	Juan Antonio Garcia	Spain (ESP)	DNF

=== Individual women ===
Rank	Athlete	Country	Time (h:m:s)
1	Zoya Ivanova	Soviet Union (URS)	2:30:39
2	Maria Rebelo	France (FRA)	2:31:27
3	Katrin Dörre	East Germany (GDR)	2:31:30
4	Tatyana Gridnyeva	Soviet Union (URS)	2:31:56
5	Yekaterina Khramenkova	Soviet Union (URS)	2:32:04
6	Kim Mi-gyeong	South Korea (KOR)	2:32:40
7	Irina Bogacheva	Soviet Union (URS)	2:33:50
8	Uta Pippig	East Germany (GDR)	2:34:48
9	Gabriela Wolf	West Germany (FRG)	2:35:12
10	Genoveva Eichenmann	Switzerland (SUI)	2:35:40
11	Annette Fincke	East Germany (GDR)	2:35:52
12	Rita Marchisio	Italy (ITA)	2:36:12
13	Antonella Bizioli	Italy (ITA)	2:36:39
14	Janice Ettle	United States (USA)	2:37:02
15	Im Eun-ju	South Korea (KOR)	2:37:06
16	Mercedes Calleja	Spain (ESP)	2:37:13
17	Françoise Bonnet	France (FRA)	2:37:34
18	Sally Ellis	Great Britain (GBR)	2:37:39
19	Jocelyne Villeton	France (FRA)	2:37:40
20	Carolyn Naisby	Great Britain (GBR)	2:38:04
21	Irina Ruban	Soviet Union (URS)	2:38:07
22	Maria Curatolo	Italy (ITA)	2:38:30
23	Emma Scaunich	Italy (ITA)	2:39:26
24	Carol McLatchie	United States (USA)	2:39:39
25	Paola Moro	Italy (ITA)	2:40:18
26	Sandra Branney	Great Britain (GBR)	2:40:44
27	Kristina Garlipp	East Germany (GDR)	2:42:37
28	Maria-Luisa Irizar	Spain (ESP)	2:42:49
29	Anne Corneliussen	Norway (NOR)	2:43:34
30	Laura de Wald	United States (USA)	2:43:56
31	Margaret Reddan	Australia (AUS)	2:44:05
32	Patricia Rapet	France (FRA)	2:44:39
33	Gizela Molnar	Hungary (HUN)	2:45:31
34	Hanne Jensen	Denmark (DEN)	2:45:46
35	Denise Verhaert	Belgium (BEL)	2:45:55
36	Viviene Van Buggenhout	Belgium (BEL)	2:46:08
37	Bernadette Hudy	West Germany (FRG)	2:46:17
38	Petrina Trowbridge	Australia (AUS)	2:46:48
39	Consuelo Alonso	Spain (ESP)	2:46:52
40	Maria-Esther Pedrosa	Spain (ESP)	2:47:05
41	Joan Carstensen	Denmark (DEN)	2:47:26
42	Oddrun Hovsengen	Norway (NOR)	2:48:25
43	Ellinor Ljungros	Sweden (SWE)	2:48:37
44	Carmen Mingorance	Spain (ESP)	2:49:10
45	Margarita Galicia	Mexico (MEX)	2:49:48
46	Eva Isaacs	Sweden (SWE)	2:49:55
47	Ilona Zsilak	Hungary (HUN)	2:50:36
48	Barbara Filutze	United States (USA)	2:51:06
49	Jillian Costley	New Zealand (NZL)	2:51:13
50	Helle Dossing	Denmark (DEN)	2:51:23
51	Teresa Kidd	Ireland (IRL)	2:51:29
53	May-Britt Aastad	Sweden (SWE)	2:52:52
54	Tove Lorentzen	Denmark (DEN)	2:53:23
67	Cheryl Harper	United States (USA)	3:06:38
