= 1989 World Marathon Cup =

World Marathon Cup in Milan

The 1989 World Marathon Cup was the third edition of the World Marathon Cup of athletics and were held in Milan, Italy.

== Results ==
Team men
#	Nations	Time
1	Ethiopia; Metaferia Zeleke; Dereje Nedi; Wami Alemayehu	6:37:20
2	Italy; Gianni Poli; Salvatore Bettiol; Osvaldo Faustini	6:37:51
3	France; Dominique Chauvelier; Bertrand Itsweire; Alexandre Gonzalez	6:38:51

Team women
#	Nations	Time
1	Soviet Union; Yekaterina Khramenkova; Irina Yagodina; Valentina Yegorova	7:51:29
2	United States; Susan Marchiano; Gordon Bakoulis; Charlotte Thomas	7:56:17
3	China; Li Juan; Li Yemei; Xie Lihua	7:57:07

=== Individual men ===
Rank	Athlete	Country	Time (h:m:s)
1	Metaferia Zeleke	Ethiopia (ETH)	2:10:28
2	Dereje Nedi	Ethiopia (ETH)	2:10:36
3	Gianni Poli	Italy (ITA)	2:10:49
4	Ravil Kashapov	Soviet Union (URS)	2:11:07
5	Dominique Chauvelier	France (FRA)	2:11:24
6	Bertrand Itsweire	France (FRA)	2:11:40
7	Salvatore Bettiol	Italy (ITA)	2:12:41
8	Takeshi So	Japan (JPN)	2:12:53
9	Rainer Wachenbrunner	Germany (GER)	2:13:08
10	Konrad Dobler	Germany (GER)	2:13:51
11	Diamantino dosSantos	Brazil (BRA)	2:13:57
12	Nikolay Tabak	Soviet Union (URS)	2:14:03
13	Rustam Shagiev	Soviet Union (URS)	2:14:08
14	Osvaldo Faustini	Italy (ITA)	2:14:21
15	Radames Gonzalez	Cuba (CUB)	2:14:32
16	Honorato Hernandez	Spain (ESP)	2:15:02
17	Kazuyoshi Kudo	Japan (JPN)	2:15:11
18	Uwe Koch	Germany (GER)	2:15:16
19	Yakov Tolstikov	Soviet Union (URS)	2:15:35
20	Paul Herlihy	New Zealand (NZL)	2:15:38
21	Orlando Pizzolato	Italy (ITA)	2:15:46
22	Alexandre Gonzalez	France (FRA)	2:15:47
23	Won-Tak Kim	South Korea (KOR)	2:16:00
24	Wami Alemayehu	Ethiopia (ETH)	2:16:16
25	Valmir deCarvalho	Brazil (BRA)	2:16:23
26	Werner Grommisch	Germany (GER)	2:16:27
27	Guido Dold	Germany (GER)	2:16:32
28	Yevgeniy Okorokov	Soviet Union (URS)	2:16:40
29	Driss Lakkim	Morocco (MAR)	2:16:49
30	Michel Constant	France (FRA)	2:17:06
31	Sebio Sikanyka	Zambia (ZAM)	2:17:18
32	Francisco Pastor	Spain (ESP)	2:17:21
33	Vithana Samarasinghe	Sri Lanka (SRI)	2:17:35
34	Steven Poulton	Australia (AUS)	2:17:39
35	Mory Werner	Belgium (BEL)	2:17:39
36	William Bedell	Great Britain (GBR)	2:17:40
37	Enrique Cortinas	Spain (ESP)	2:17:51
38	Richard Umberg	Switzerland (SUI)	2:18:02
39	Graham Macky	New Zealand (NZL)	2:18:06
40	Tesfaye Tafa	Ethiopia (ETH)	2:18:23
41	Mohamed Abdi-Said	Djibouti (DJI)	2:18:48
42	Kuruppu Karunaratne	Sri Lanka (SRI)	2:18:53
43	Heiko Klimmer	Germany (GER)	2:18:56
44	Francis Mukuka	Zambia (ZAM)	2:19:06
45	Nourredine Sobhi	Morocco (MAR)	2:19:09
46	Omar Moussa	Djibouti (DJI)	2:19:18
47	Tomohiro Imamura	Japan (JPN)	2:19:20
48	Christos Papachristos	Greece (GRE)	2:19:32
49	Isidro Rico	Mexico (MEX)	2:20:13
50	Jacques Marechet	France (FRA)	2:20:14
51	John Fitzgerald	Ireland (IRL)	2:20:28
52	Jesús Valdez Falcón	Mexico (MEX)	2:20:32
53	Jacob Marti	Switzerland (SUI)	2:20:37
54	Georgios Malliaris	Greece (GRE)	2:20:52
55	Eamonn Tierney	Ireland (IRL)	2:21:08
57	Bigboy Matlapeng	Botswana (BOT)	2:21:58
59	Peter Lyrenmann	Switzerland (SUI)	2:22:23
60	James Hage	United States (USA)	2:22:25
61	Gerard Barrett	Australia (AUS)	2:22:32
62	James Girven	New Zealand (NZL)	2:22:42
63	Peter DeVocht	Belgium (BEL)	2:23:11
65	Maurice Cowman	Ireland (IRL)	2:23:44
66	Adam Hoyle	Australia (AUS)	2:23:46
67	Tomas Oliveras	Portugal (POR)	2:23:52
70	Rachid Tbahi	Morocco (MAR)	2:24:25
71	Moacir Marconi	Brazil (BRA)	2:24:36
74	Driss Dacha	Morocco (MAR)	2:25:46
76	Robert Hensley	United States (USA)	2:26:17
78	Domingos Neves	Portugal (POR)	2:26:56
79	Jean-Luc Debaissieux	Belgium (BEL)	2:27:59
82	James Klein	United States (USA)	2:28:57
88	Michael Thompson	Great Britain (GBR)	2:34:10
—	Peter Brett	Australia (AUS)	DNF
—	Michael Bishop	Great Britain (GBR)	DNF
—	Fraser Clyne	Great Britain (GBR)	DNF
—	Michael Heilmann	Germany (GER)	DNF
—	Spyridon Andriopoulos	Greece (GRE)	DNF
—	Salvatore Nicosia	Italy (ITA)	DNF
—	Gary Gargasz	United States (USA)	DNF
—	Vicente Anton	Spain (ESP)	DNF

=== Individual women ===
Rank	Athlete	Country	Time (h:m:s)
1	Susan Marchiano	United States (USA)	2:30:48
2	Misako Miyahara	Japan (JPN)	2:35:16
3	Uta Pippig	Germany (GER)	2:35:17
4	Yekaterina Khramenkova	Soviet Union (URS)	2:35:20
5	Irina Yagodina	Soviet Union (URS)	2:35:55
6	Katsuyo Hyodo	Japan (JPN)	2:36:06
7	Li Juan	China (CHN)	2:36:20
8	Gordon Bakoulis	United States (USA)	2:37:17
9	Li Yemei	China (CHN)	2:39:20
10	Suk-Song Kim	South Korea (KOR)	2:39:27
11	Annette Fincke	Germany (GER)	2:39:31
12	Anne Roden	Great Britain (GBR)	2:39:36
13	Emma Scaunich	Italy (ITA)	2:40:01
14	Françoise Bonnet	France (FRA)	2:40:12
15	Valentina Yegorova	Soviet Union (URS)	2:40:14
16	Xie Lihua	China (CHN)	2:40:52
17	Graziella Striuli	Italy (ITA)	2:41:15
18	Jocelyne Villeton	France (FRA)	2:41:31
19	Antonella Bizioli	Italy (ITA)	2:42:10
20	Myong-Hui Kim	North Korea (PRK)	2:42:23
21	Sharon Higgins	New Zealand (NZL)	2:42:24
22	Sylviane Levesque	France (FRA)	2:42:26
23	Maria-Luisa Irizar	Spain (ESP)	2:42:39
24	Marina Prat	Spain (ESP)	2:43:19
25	Sun-Gyong Lim	North Korea (PRK)	2:43:25
26	Xiao Hongyan	China (CHN)	2:43:51
27	Anna-Isabel Holtkamp	Germany (GER)	2:44:05
28	Li Xiuxia	China (CHN)	2:45:31
29	Luzia Sahli	Switzerland (SUI)	2:45:42
30	Jillian Costley	New Zealand (NZL)	2:45:49
31	Petra Liebertz	Germany (GER)	2:45:56
32	Hiromi Hayashi	Japan (JPN)	2:46:43
33	Ursula Starke	Germany (GER)	2:46:55
34	Odile Poirot	France (FRA)	2:47:20
35	Silvana Cucchietti	Italy (ITA)	2:47:39
36	Elena Tsukhlo	Soviet Union (URS)	2:47:43
37	Hassania Darami	Morocco (MAR)	2:48:01
38	Charlotte Thomas	United States (USA)	2:48:12
39	Linda Rushmere	Great Britain (GBR)	2:48:15
40	Bernardine Portenski	New Zealand (NZL)	2:49:19
41	Maria-Esther Pedrosa	Spain (ESP)	2:51:08
42	Mary Brayley	Ireland (IRL)	2:51:24
43	Sylvia Kerambrum	Great Britain (GBR)	2:51:57
45	Patricia Hinson	United States (USA)	2:54:33
47	Winnie Lai-chu Ng	Hong Kong (HKG)	2:55:04
48	Heather MacDuff	Great Britain (GBR)	2:55:14
49	Gloria Corona	Mexico (MEX)	2:58:23
56	Zahra Akrachi	Morocco (MAR)	3:09:00
—	Maria Rebelo	France (FRA)	DNF
—	Laura Fogli	Italy (ITA)	DNF
—	Zoya Ivanova	Soviet Union (URS)	DNF
—	Mary Level	United States (USA)	DNF
