= 1983 European Marathon Cup =

1983 Marathon competition held in Laredo, Spain

The 1983 European Marathon Cup was the second edition of the European Marathon Cup of athletics and were held in Laredo, Spain.

== Team ==
Team men
#	Nations	Points
1	East Germany	22
2	Italy	28
3	Spain	45

Team women
Not held in this 2nd edition.

== Individual men ==
Individual men
Rank	Athlete	Nation	Time
1	Waldemar Cierpinski	East Germany (GDR)	2:12:26
2	Jürgen Eberding	East Germany (GDR)	2:12:26
3	Gianni Poli	Italy (ITA)	2:12:28
4	Marco Marchei	Italy (ITA)	2:12:49
5	Michael Heilmann	East Germany (GDR)	2:12:55
6	Santiago de la Parte	Spain (ESP)	2:13:24
7	Jose Reveyn	Belgium (BEL)	2:13:30
8	Giampaolo Messina	Italy (ITA)	2:14:10
9	Dominique Chauvelier	France (FRA)	2:14:22
10	Johan Geirnaert	Belgium (BEL)	2:14:40
11	Juan Carlos Traspaderne	Spain (ESP)	2:14:51
12	Ricardo Ortega	Spain (ESP)	2:15:23
13	Antonio Erotavo	Italy (ITA)	2:15:31
14	Hans-Joachim Truppel	East Germany (GDR)	2:15:41
15	Eberhardt Weyel	West Germany (FRG)	2:15:56
16	Eleuterio Antón	Spain (ESP)	2:16:33
17	Jürgen Dächert	West Germany (FRG)	2:16:45
18	Reinhard Leibold	West Germany (FRG)	2:17:07
19	Mervyn Brameld	Great Britain (GBR)	2:17:08
20	Franz Homberger	West Germany (FRG)	2:17:20
21	Peter Lyrenmann	Switzerland (SUI)	2:17:22
22	John Cain	Great Britain (GBR)	2:17:28
23	Jörg Ludwig	East Germany (GDR)	2:17:29
24	Ryszard Misiewicz	Poland (POL)	2:17:53
25	Bernard Faure	France (FRA)	2:18:10
26	Renato Graça	Portugal (POR)	2:18:37
27	Manuel de Oliviera	Portugal (POR)	2:18:46
28	Leonid Moseyev	Soviet Union (URS)	2:19:02
29	Jörg Peter	East Germany (GDR)	2:19:03
30	Jose-Oscar Santos	Portugal (POR)	2:19:21
31	Udo Engelbrecht	West Germany (FRG)	2:19:24
32	Andrzej Sajkowski	Poland (POL)	2:19:44
33	Czeslaw Wilczewski	Poland (POL)	2:19:54
39	Orlando Pizzolato	Italy (ITA)	2:22:03
—	Michelangelo Arena	Italy (ITA)	DNF

== Individual women ==
Individual women
Rank	Athlete	Nation	Time
1st place, gold medalist(s)	Nadezhda Gumerova	Soviet Union (URS)	2:38:36
2nd place, silver medalist(s)	Tamara Surotseva	Soviet Union (URS)	2:39:17
3rd place, bronze medalist(s)	Raisa Sadreydinova	Soviet Union (URS)	2:40:22
4	Priscilla Welch	Great Britain (GBR)	2:42:23
5	Zhanna Domoratskaya	Soviet Union (URS)	2:42:26
6	Joaquina Casas	Spain (ESP)	2:53:13
