= 1981 European Marathon Cup =

1981 Marathon competition held in Agen, France

The 1981 European Marathon Cup was the first edition of the European Marathon Cup of athletics and were held in Agen, France.

== Team ==
Team men
#	Nations	Points
1	Italy	30
2	Soviet Union	72
3	Poland	80

Team women
Not held in this 1st edition.

== Individual men ==
Individual men
Rank	Athlete	Nation	Time
1st place, gold medalist(s)	Massimo Magnani	Italy (ITA)	2:13:29
2nd place, silver medalist(s)	Waldemar Cierpinski	Germany (GER)	2:15:44
3rd place, bronze medalist(s)	Tommy Persson	Sweden (SWE)	2:15:45
4	Ryszard Marczak	Poland (POL)	2:15:50
5	Hugh Jones	Great Britain (GBR)	2:16:18
6	Pertti Tiainen	Finland (FIN)	2:16:40
7	Anatoliy Aryukov	Soviet Union (URS)	2:16:47
8	Giampaolo Messina	Italy (ITA)	2:16:56
9	Gianni Poli	Italy (ITA)	2:17:28
10	Vladimir Kotov	Soviet Union (URS)	2:18:17
11	Ferenc Szekeres	Hungary (HUN)	2:18:30
12	Armando Scozzari	Italy (ITA)	2:18:49
13	Eleuterio Antón	Spain (ESP)	2:19:00
14	Kjell-Erik Ståhl	Sweden (SWE)	2:19:20
15	Janos Szekeres	Hungary (HUN)	2:19:31
16	Julien Grimon	Belgium (BEL)	2:19:34
17	Jozef Mitka	Poland (POL)	2:19:55
18	Svein Arve Pedersen	Norway (NOR)	2:20:14
19	David Cannon	Great Britain (GBR)	2:20:19
20	Igor Yefimov	Soviet Union (URS)	2:20:43
21	Cor Vriend	Netherlands (NED)	2:21:07
22	Vicente Polo	Spain (ESP)	2:21:16
23	Jürgen Eberding	East Germany (GDR)	2:21:18
24	Pavol Madar	Slovakia (SVK)	2:21:23
25	Hans-Joachim Truppel	East Germany (GDR)	2:21:32
26	Andy Holden	Great Britain (GBR)	2:21:53
27	Henryk Nogala	Poland (POL)	2:22:18
28	Juan Carlos Traspaderne	Spain (ESP)	2:22:23
29	Martin Hafström	Sweden (SWE)	2:22:40
35	Satymkul Dzhumanazarov	Soviet Union (URS)	2:23:36
38	Leonid Moseyev	Soviet Union (URS)	2:24:06
41	Dominique Chauvelier	France (FRA)	2:24:46
47	Vito Basiliana	Italy (ITA)	2:25:58
50	Gilbert Bessieres	France (FRA)	2:26:15
51	Andrew Robertson	Great Britain (GBR)	2:27:01
66	Michel Lelut	France (FRA)	2:32:11
—	Malcolm East	Great Britain (GBR)	DNF
—	John Graham	Great Britain (GBR)	DNF

== Individual women ==
Individual women
Rank	Athlete	Nation	Time
1st place, gold medalist(s)	Zoya Ivanova	Soviet Union (URS)	2:38:58
2nd place, silver medalist(s)	Charlotte Teske	West Germany (FRG)	2:41:04
3rd place, bronze medalist(s)	Nadezhda Gumerova	Soviet Union (URS)	2:44:49
4	Christa Vahlensieck	West Germany (FRG)	2:45:03
5	Laura Fogli	Italy (ITA)	2:45:41
6	Heidi Hutterer	West Germany (FRG)	2:48:25
7	Maria Pia D'Orlando	Italy (ITA)	2:48:46
8	Margherita Gargano	Italy (ITA)	2:51:11
9	Gerlinde Püttmann	West Germany (FRG)	2:55:20
10	Elli Hallikainen	Finland (FIN)	2:55:58
11	Odile Leveque	France (FRA)	3:00:22
