= 1985 World Marathon Cup =

World Marathon Cup in Hiroshima

The 1985 World Marathon Cup was the first edition of the World Marathon Cup of athletics and were held in Hiroshima, Japan, on 13 and 14 April.

== Results ==
=== Men ===
Team men
#	Nations	Time
1	Djibouti; Hussein Ahmed Salah; Djama Robleh; Omar Abdillahi Charmarke	6:27:08
2	Japan; Takeyuki Nakayama; Takeshi So; Shigeru So	6:31:43
3	Ethiopia; Abebe Mekonnen; Kebede Balcha; Dereje Nedi	6:32:46

Individual men
Rank	Athlete	Country	Time (h:m:s)
1	Hussein Ahmed Salah	Djibouti (DJI)	2:08:09
2	Takeyuki Nakayama	Japan (JPN)	2:08:15
3	Djama Robleh	Djibouti (DJI)	2:08:26
4	Michael Heilmann	East Germany (GDR)	2:09:03
5	Abebe Mekonnen	Ethiopia (ETH)	2:09:05
6	Orlando Pizzolato	Italy (ITA)	2:10:23
7	Omar Abdillahi Charmarke	Djibouti (DJI)	2:10:33
8	Takeshi So	Japan (JPN)	2:11:01
9	Massimo Magnani	Italy (ITA)	2:11:02
10	Juma Ikangaa	Tanzania (TAN)	2:11:06
11	Kebede Balcha	Ethiopia (ETH)	2:11:19
12	Gelindo Bordin	Italy (ITA)	2:11:29
13	Dean Matthews	United States (USA)	2:11:48
14	Herbert Steffny	West Germany (FRG)	2:11:49
15	Aldo Fantoni	Italy (ITA)	2:12:09
16	Dereje Nedi	Ethiopia (ETH)	2:12:22
17	Shigeru So	Japan (JPN)	2:12:27
18	Peter Pfitzinger	United States (USA)	2:12:28
19	Alain Lazare	France (FRA)	2:12:53
20	Daniel Nzioka	Kenya (KEN)	2:13:26
21	Dick Hooper	Ireland (IRL)	2:13:34
22	Luc Waegeman	Belgium (BEL)	2:13:49
23	Alessio Faustini	Italy (ITA)	2:13:55
24	Jong-Hyong Lee	North Korea (PRK)	2:13:56
25	Viktor Semyenov	Ukraine (UKR)	2:14:07
26	Eberhardt Weyel	West Germany (FRG)	2:14:22
27	Antoni Niemczak	Poland (POL)	2:14:30
28	Alfonso Abellán	Spain (ESP)	2:14:31
29	Istvan Kerekjarto	Hungary (HUN)	2:14:33
30	Yevgeniy Okorokov	Ukraine (UKR)	2:14:35
31	Mervyn Brameld	Great Britain (GBR)	2:14:36
32	Roy Dooney	Ireland (IRL)	2:14:38
33	Hugo Rey	Switzerland (SUI)	2:14:39
34	Paul Ballinger	New Zealand (NZL)	2:14:42
35	Franz Homberger	West Germany (FRG)	2:14:56
36	Jörg Peter	East Germany (GDR)	2:15:04
37	Zoltan Koszegi	Hungary (HUN)	2:15:17
38	Derek Froude	New Zealand (NZL)	2:15:32
39	Honorato Hernández	Spain (ESP)	2:15:48
40	Frantisek Visnicky	Czechoslovakia (TCH)	2:15:53
41	John Burra	Tanzania (TAN)	2:15:59
42	Sergey Rudenko	Soviet Union (URS)	2:16:00
43	Jae-Song Yoo	South Korea (KOR)	2:16:04
44	Frank Konzack	East Germany (GDR)	2:16:07
45	Jean-Yves Madelon	France (FRA)	2:16:09
46	Stephen-Glenn Forster	Great Britain (GBR)	2:16:14
47	Graham Macky	New Zealand (NZL)	2:16:17
48	Fraser Clyne	Great Britain (GBR)	2:16:20
49	Mojmir Lanicek	Czechoslovakia (TCH)	2:16:36
50	Willem Zegers	Netherlands (NED)	2:16:39
51	Elói Schleder	Brazil (BRA)	2:16:46
52	Taisuke Kodama	Japan (JPN)	2:16:51
53	Tommy Persson	Sweden (SWE)	2:16:54
54	Youssef Doukal	Djibouti (DJI)	2:16:57
55	Peter Lyrenmann	Switzerland (SUI)	2:17:18
56	Gino Braeckevelt	Belgium (BEL)	2:17:20
57	Herminio Martins	Portugal (POR)	2:17:21
58	Juan Zetina	Mexico (MEX)	2:17:27
59	Steven Poulton	Australia (AUS)	2:17:30
60	Xu Liang	China (CHN)	2:17:33
61	Victor Mudehwe	Zimbabwe (ZIM)	2:17:50
62	Georgios Afordakos	Greece (GRE)	2:17:56
63	Robert Wallace	Australia (AUS)	2:18:03
64	Klevestostenes Albuquerque	Brazil (BRA)	2:18:04
65	Jean-Jacques Padel	France (FRA)	2:18:06
66	Jose-Oscar Santos	Portugal (POR)	2:18:10
67	Jerzy Skarżyński	Poland (POL)	2:18:12
68	Luis Bautista	Venezuela (VEN)	2:18:18
69	Per Hoffmann	Denmark (DEN)	2:18:38
70	Dong-Myong Lee	North Korea (PRK)	2:18:41
71	Muya Wachira	Canada (CAN)	2:18:43
72	Michael Dyon	Canada (CAN)	2:19:00
73	James Fallon	Ireland (IRL)	2:19:00
74	Mergessa Tula	Ethiopia (ETH)	2:19:03
75	Richard Umberg	Switzerland (SUI)	2:19:09
76	Jeffrey Martin	Canada (CAN)	2:19:13
77	Kunimitsu Itō	Japan (JPN)	2:19:14
78	Jean-Michel Charbonnel	France (FRA)	2:19:18
79	Jürgen Eberding	East Germany (GDR)	2:19:25
80	Andras Mozes	Hungary (HUN)	2:19:28
81	Juan Camacho	Bolivia (BOL)	2:19:36
82	Paul Craig	Great Britain (GBR)	2:19:40
83	Wiktor Sawicki	Poland (POL)	2:19:57
84	Henryk Lupa	Poland (POL)	2:20:07
116	Wojciech Ratkowski	Poland (POL)	2:24:55
—	Mark Finucane	United States (USA)	DNF
—	Michael Pinocci	United States (USA)	DNF
—	Fred Torneden	United States (USA)	DNF

=== Women ===
Team women
#	Nations	Time
1	Italy; Laura Fogli; Rita Marchisio; Emma Scaunich	7:51:27
2	Soviet Union; Zoya Ivanova; Raisa Smekhnova; Nadezhda Usmanova	7:53:22
3	East Germany; Katrin Dörre; Birgit Stephan; Gabriele Riemann	8:00:02

Individual women
Rank	Athlete	Country	Time (h:m:s)
1	Katrin Dörre	East Germany (GDR)	2:33:30
2	Zoya Ivanova	Soviet Union (URS)	2:34:17
3	Karolina Szabó	Hungary (HUN)	2:34:57
4	Laura Fogli	Italy (ITA)	2:35:45
5	Kersti Jakobsen	Denmark (DEN)	2:35:56
6	Rita Marchisio	Italy (ITA)	2:35:59
7	Ľudmila Melicherová	Czechoslovakia (TCH)	2:36:26
8	Véronique Marot	Great Britain (GBR)	2:37:04
9	Eriko Asai	Japan (JPN)	2:37:18
10	Raisa Smekhnova	Soviet Union (URS)	2:37:31
11	Emma Scaunich	Italy (ITA)	2:39:41
12	Maria Curatolo	Italy (ITA)	2:40:09
13	Françoise Bonnet	France (FRA)	2:40:18
14	Sylvie Bornet	France (FRA)	2:40:31
15	Solweig Harrysson	Sweden (SWE)	2:41:05
16	Nadezhda Usmanova	Soviet Union (URS)	2:41:32
17	Chie Matsuda	Japan (JPN)	2:41:47
18	Xiao Hongyan	China (CHN)	2:41:56
19	Birgit Stephan	East Germany (GDR)	2:42:49
20	Magda Ilands	Belgium (BEL)	2:43:13
21	Mercedes Calleja	Spain (ESP)	2:43:39
22	Gabriele Riemann	East Germany (GDR)	2:43:43
23	Sylviane Levesque	France (FRA)	2:43:48
24	Dorothy Goertzen	Canada (CAN)	2:44:10
25	Barbara McKerrow	Australia (AUS)	2:44:23
26	Birgit Lennartz	East Germany (GDR)	2:44:41
27	Maria-Luisa Irizar	Spain (ESP)	2:45:28
28	Yuko Gordon	Hong Kong (HKG)	2:45:29
29	Nancy Ditz	United States (USA)	2:45:52
30	Denise Verhaert	Belgium (BEL)	2:46:07
31	Deborah Raunig	United States (USA)	2:46:12
32	Alba Milana	Italy (ITA)	2:46:21
33	Evy Palm	Sweden (SWE)	2:46:50
34	Grazyna Mierzejewska	Poland (POL)	2:47:05
35	Margaret Lockley	Great Britain (GBR)	2:47:15
36	Ma Liqin	China (CHN)	2:48:17
37	Consuelo Alonso	Spain (ESP)	2:48:28
38	Desiree Letherby	Australia (AUS)	2:48:43
39	Tracy Robinson	Canada (CAN)	2:49:06
40	Yoshiko Hirohama	Japan (JPN)	2:49:17
41	Gillian Castka	Great Britain (GBR)	2:49:36
42	Lutsia Belyayeva	Soviet Union (URS)	2:49:48
43	Mora Main	Australia (AUS)	2:50:25
44	Gillian Horovitz	Great Britain (GBR)	2:50:36
45	Angélica de Almeida	Brazil (BRA)	2:50:43
46	Susan Kainulainen	Canada (CAN)	2:51:15
47	Tina Wild	New Zealand (NZL)	2:51:20
48	Margaret Reddan	Australia (AUS)	2:52:30
49	Maria Rebelo	France (FRA)	2:52:47
50	Angelika Dunke	East Germany (GDR)	2:53:27
51	Sachiko Ishida	Japan (JPN)	2:53:46
52	Deirdre Nagle	Ireland (IRL)	2:53:52
53	Antonia Ladanyine	Hungary (HUN)	2:54:08
54	Winnie Lai-chu Ng	Hong Kong (HKG)	2:54:42
55	?	?	
56	?	?	
57	Kathy Ricica	Canada (CAN)	2:55:20
60?	Christine Kennedy	Ireland (IRL)	2:56:04
65?	Ailish Smyth	Ireland (IRL)	3:01:04
73	Elena Murgoci	Romania (ROM)	3:04:12
75?	Czeslawa Mentlewicz	Poland (POL)	3:05:09
—	Carol McLatchie	United States (USA)	DNF
—	Lorraine Moller	New Zealand (NZL)	DNF
—	Gabriela Gorzynska	Poland (POL)	DNF
—	Renata Walendziak	Poland (POL)	DNF
—	Ewa Wrzosek	Poland (POL)	DNF
