= José Montiel =

José Montiel may refer to:

- José Montiel (athlete) (born 1962), Spanish long-distance runner
- José Montiel (footballer) (born 1988), Paraguayan footballer
