= 2005 World Marathon Cup =

World Marathon Cup in Helsinki

The 2005 World Marathon Cup was the 11th edition of the World Marathon Cup of athletics and were held in Helsinki, Finland, inside of the 2005 World Championships. Athletes participated as teams in the men's and women's competitions, while medals were awarded by the International Association of Athletics Federations to individual world champions.

67 Runners from 11 countries (36 men and 31 women) formed the number of total athletes at the competition's start. Each country was permitted to present up to five runners in each of the two races. The sum results of their top three participants determined placement.

Moroccan runner Jaouad Gharib successfully defended his world championship title in the men's marathon, while Japan's national team won the Cup for the second consecutive time, beating their opponents from Kenya by eight minutes. Meanwhile, the Kenyan women's finished first, bringing Kenya its first team victory in the country's history of eleven World Marathon Cup appearances.

== Results ==
Team men
| # | Nations | Time |
|---|---|---|
| 1 | Japan | 6:38:39 |
| 2 | Kenya | 6:46:38 |
| 3 | Ethiopia | 6:52:14 |

Team women
| # | Nations | Time |
|---|---|---|
| 1 | Kenya | 7:12:37 |
| 2 | Japan | 7:16:35 |
| 3 | Great Britain | 7:27:04 |

Individual men
| # | Athlete | Time |
|---|---|---|
| 1st place, gold medalist(s) | Jaouad Gharib, Morocco | 2:10:10 |
| 2nd place, silver medalist(s) | Christopher Isengwe, Tanzania | 2:10:21 (PB) |
| 3rd place, bronze medalist(s) | Tsuyoshi Ogata, Japan | 2:11:16 (SB) |
| 4 | Toshinari Takaoka, Japan | 2:11:53 |
| 5 | Samson Ramadhani, Tanzania | 2:12:08 (SB) |
| 6 | Alex Malinga, Uganda | 2:12:12 (NR) |
| 7 | Paul Biwott, Kenya | 2:12:39 |
| 8 | Julio Rey, Spain | 2:12:51 |
| 9 | Brian Sell, United States | 2:13:27 (SB) |
| 10 | Marilson Gomes dos Santos, Brazil | 2:13:40 (SB) |

Individual women
| # | Athlete | Time |
|---|---|---|
| 1st place, gold medalist(s) | Paula Radcliffe (GBR) | 2:20:57 (CR) |
| 2nd place, silver medalist(s) | Catherine Ndereba (KEN) | 2:22:01 (SB) |
| 3rd place, bronze medalist(s) | Constantina Tomescu (ROM) | 2:23:19 |
| 4 | Derartu Tulu (ETH) | 2:23:30 (PB) |
| 5 | Zhou Chunxiu (CHN) | 2:24:12 |
| 6 | Yumiko Hara (JPN) | 2:24:20 |
| 7 | Rita Jeptoo (KEN) | 2:24:22 (PB) |
| 8 | Harumi Hiroyama (JPN) | 2:25:46 |
| 9 | Hellen Jemaiyo Kimutai (KEN) | 2:26:14 (SB) |
| 10 | Megumi Oshima (JPN) | 2:26:29 |

== See also ==
- 2005 World Championships in Athletics – Men's Marathon
- 2005 World Championships in Athletics – Women's Marathon
