= Ravil Kashapov =

Russian athletics competitor

Personal information
- Nationality: Soviet Union/Russia
- Born: 15 November 1956 (age 69) Bolgar, Tatarstan, Russia
- Height: 1.70 m (5 ft 7 in)
- Weight: 61 kg (134 lb)

Sport
- Sport: Running
- Events: 5000 metres, 10,000 metres, Marathon, Ultramarathon
Medal record
Men's athletics
Representing Russia
100 km World Championships
Bronze medal – third place	1998 Kochi	100 km
Representing Soviet Union
European Marathon Cup
Gold medal – first place	1988 Huy	Marathon

Ravil Iskhakovich Kashapov, мсмк (Russian: Равиль Исхакович Кашапов; born 15 November 1956) is a Russian ultramarathon and former marathon runner. He represented the Soviet Union at the 1987 World Championships and 1988 Summer Olympics.

He is currently an assistant professor at Kama State Institute of Physical Culture, as well as vice-president of the Tatarstan Athletics Federation. He was named a Master of Sport of the USSR, International Class.

== Early life ==
Kashapov was born on November 15, 1956, in the town of Bolgar, Spassky District, Republic of Tatarstan in Soviet Russia. He graduated from Kazan Federal University in the Volga region in 1979 with a degree in biochemistry. In his third year at the university, at 22 years old, he started training in athletics. His first coach was Hanif Mubarakzyanovich Murtazin, an Honoured Worker of Physical Culture of the Russian Federation, who convinced him to train as a runner after seeing him messing around with friends.

In 1981, he began competing at professional athletics events. That same year, he also began his career as a sports medicine professor at various universities across the country.

== Career ==
Kashapov began running marathons in 1986. In 1987, he won the gold medal at the Soviet Union Championships, thus qualifying for the 1987 World Championships in Rome, where he finished 8th, and the 1988 Summer Olympics in Seoul. He was the only Soviet man who competed in the Olympic marathon that year, finishing in 10th place. Also that year, Kashapov won gold at the 1988 European Marathon Cup in Huy, Belgium

He started the following year with a rare appearance at the 1989 IAAF World Cross Country Championships, finishing 74th in the long race (12 km). In April, he ran a personal best 2:11:07 time to finish fourth at the 1989 World Marathon Cup in Milan. Six months later, he finished second in the Chicago Marathon, losing to Englishman Paul Davies-Hale by just under two minutes. For the second straight year, he finished second at the Fukuoka Marathon in December. In addition, he competed at two IAAF events, the World Cup (4th in the marathon) and Golden Gala.

1990 was his last year competing at the world-class level, finishing 20th at the European Athletics Championships marathon event in Split.

From 1991 to 1997, Kashapov ran in various city marathons around the world, as well as occasional shorter races, with moderate success. Running out of Tampa, he finished 6th at the 1991 Houston Marathon and 3rd at the 1992 Pittsburgh Marathon.

In the late 1990s, he started running ultramarathons, races ranging from 50 to 100 kilometres. His greatest success came in 1998, when he won first place at the Russian 100 km Championships in Moscow, 3rd in the IAU World 100 km Championships in Kochi, Japan, and 5th in the annual Comrades Marathon (87 km). He was the over 45 age category winner in each one.

== Competition record ==
Year	Competition	Venue	Position	Event	Notes
Representing the Soviet Union
1986	Goodwill Games	Moscow, Soviet Union	4th	Marathon	2:17:10
1987	World Championships	Rome, Italy	8th	Marathon	2:14:41
1988	Summer Olympics	Seoul, South Korea	10th	Marathon	2:13:49
1988	European Marathon Cup	Huy, Belgium	1st	Marathon	2:11:30
1989	World Cross Country Championships	Stavanger, Norway	74th	12 km	42:30
1989	World Marathon Cup	Milan, Italy	4th	Marathon	2:11:07
1989	European Cup	Gateshead, England	6th	10,000 metres	29:32.47
1989	IAAF World Cup	Barcelona, Spain	4th	Marathon	2:11:07
1989	IAAF Golden Gala	Pescara, Italy	9th	5,000 metres	13:37.26
1990	European Championships	Split, Yugoslavia	20th	Marathon	2:28:49
Representing Russia
1998	World 100 km Championships	Kochi, Japan	3rd	100 km	6:36:33
2001	European 100 km Championships	Winschoten, Netherlands	7th	100 km	7:03:27
2002	World 100 km Championships	Torhout, Belgium	12th	100 km	6:57:20
2002	European 100 km Championships	Winschoten, Netherlands	9th	100 km	6:57:39
2003	World 100 km Championships	Taipei, Taiwan	20th	100 km	8:08:32
2003	European 100 km Championships	Chernogolovka, Russia	26th	100 km	7:22:33
2004	World 100 km Championships	Winschoten, Netherlands	52nd	100 km	6:30:00

=== Other events ===
Year	Competition	Venue	Position	Event	Notes
Representing the Soviet Union
1982	Znamenskiy Brothers Memorial	Moscow, Soviet Union	6th	10,000 metres	28:18.40
1986	Soviet Championships	Kiev, Soviet Union	4th	10,000 metres	28:39.50
1987	Uzhhorod Marathon	Uzhhorod, Soviet Union	5th	Marathon	2:13:12
1987	Soviet Championships	Bryansk, Soviet Union	2nd	10,000 metres	28:41.94
1987	Soviet Union Championships	Mogilyev, Soviet Union	1st	Marathon	2:12:43
1988	Fukuoka Marathon	Fukuoka, Japan	2nd	Marathon	2:11:19
1988	Soviet Championships	Kiev, Soviet Union	7th	5,000 metres	13:46.13
1988	Brothers Znamensky Memorial	Leningrad, Soviet Union	2nd	10,000 metres	27:56.75
1988	Memorial Van Damme	Brussels, Belgium	15th	10,000 metres	28:29.40
1989	Chicago Marathon	Chicago, Illinois, USA	2nd	Marathon	2:13:19
1989	Fukuoka Marathon	Fukuoka, Japan	2nd	Marathon	2:12:54
1990	Fukuoka Marathon	Fukuoka, Japan	4th	Marathon	2:14:27
1990	London Marathon	London, England	50th	Marathon	2:18:35
1990	Brothers Znamensky Memorial	Moscow, Soviet Union	6th	10,000 metres	28:32.63
Representing Russia
1991	Houston Marathon	Houston, Texas, USA	6th	Marathon	2:14:56
1991	London Marathon	London, England	126th	Marathon	2:21:52
1991	Red Lobster Classic	Orlando, Florida, USA	30th	10 km road	31:19
1991	Jacksonville River Run	Jacksonville, Florida, USA	30th	15 km	47:25
1991	Limerick Treaty 300 International Crosscountry	Limerick, Ireland	35th	8.75 km	28:24
1992	Pittsburgh Marathon	Pittsburgh, Pennsylvania, USA	3rd	Marathon	2:19:11
1992	Lake Biwa Marathon	Ōtsu, Japan	9th	Marathon	2:15:56
1992	Gold Coast Marathon	Gold Coast, Australia	9th	Marathon	2:19:15
1992	ADT Bermuda	Hamilton, Bermuda	17th	10 km	34:01
1996	Istanbul Marathon	Istanbul, Turkey	8th	Marathon	2:25:25
1996	Belgrade Marathon	Belgrade, Serbia	26th	Marathon	2:27:59
1996	Siberian International Marathon	Omsk, Russia	10th	Marathon	2:26:18
1996	Vratskiy Kholmy Marathon	Kirov, Russia	1st	Marathon	2:19:11
1997	Twin Cities Marathon	Minneapolis, Minnesota, USA	14th	Marathon	2:23:10
1997	Siberian International Marathon	Omsk, Russia	7th	Marathon	2:19:36
1998	Russian 100 km Championships	Moscow, Russia	1st	100 km	6:33:46
1998	Comrades Marathon	Durban, South Africa	5th	87 km	5:37:26
1999	Comrades Marathon	Pietermaritzburg, South Africa	23rd	89 km	6:01:02
1999	Siberian International Marathon	Omsk, Russia	15th	Marathon	2:25:24
1999	RABO-Interpolis RUN te Winschoten	Winschoten, Netherlands	10th	100 km	6:33:17
2000	Comrades Marathon	Durban, South Africa	30th	87 km	6:08:11
2000	Moscow International Peace Marathon	Moscow, Russia	7th	Marathon	2:27:33
2001	Russian 100 km Championships	Chernogolovka, Russia	9th	100 km	7:08:24
2001	Moscow Luzhniki Marathon	Moscow, Russia	4th	Marathon	2:31:27
2001	RABO-Interpolis RUN te Winschoten	Winschoten, Netherlands	7th	100 km	7:03:27
2002	Pedestres Villa de Madrid 100 km	Madrid, Spain	6th	100 km	7:13:04
2005	Russian 15 km Road Championships	Moscow, Russia	41st	15 km	52:14
2010	Chelyabinsk Self-Transcendence 50 km	Chelyabinsk, Russia	7th	50 km	4:27:49
2011	Chelyabinsk Self-Transcendence 50 km	Chelyabinsk, Russia	10th	50 km	4:34:49

== Personal bests ==
Outdoor

- 5000 metres – 13:37.26 (Pescara, 1989)
- 10,000 metres – 27:56.75 (Leningrad, 1988)
- 10 km road – 31:19 (Orlando, 1991)
- Marathon – 2:11:07 (Milan, 1989)
- 100 km road – 6:33:05 (Winschoten, 1999)

== Personal ==
He has two sons, Renat and Ruslan, who both run competitively as well.
