= 1990 European Athletics Championships – Men's marathon =

Men's marathon at the European Athletics Championships

These are the official results of the Men's Marathon event at the 1990 European Championships in Split, Yugoslavia. The final was held on 1 September 1990.

== Medalists ==
Gold	Gelindo Bordin; Italy (ITA)
Silver	Gianni Poli; Italy (ITA)
Bronze	Dominique Chauvelier; France (FRA)

== Abbreviations ==
- All times shown are in hours:minutes:seconds

DNS	did not start
NM	no mark
WR	world record
AR	area record
NR	national record
PB	personal best
SB	season best

== Final ranking ==
1 September

Rank	Name	Nationality	Time	Notes
1st place, gold medalist(s)	Gelindo Bordin	Italy	2:14:02	
2nd place, silver medalist(s)	Gianni Poli	Italy	2:14:55	
3rd place, bronze medalist(s)	Dominique Chauvelier	France	2:15:20	
4	Salvatore Bettiol	Italy	2:17:45	
5	José Esteban Montiel	Spain	2:17:51	
6	Geoff Wightman	United Kingdom	2:18:01	
7	Karel David	Czechoslovakia	2:18:05	
8	Manuel Matias	Portugal	2:18:52	
9	Konrad Dobler	West Germany	2:19:36	
10	Juan Francisco Romera	Spain	2:19:58	
11	Csaba Szűcs	Hungary	2:20:48	
12	Mirko Vindiš	Yugoslavia	2:21:05	
13	Rustam Shagiyev	Soviet Union	2:21:49	
14	Marti ten Kate	Netherlands	2:21:55	
15	Roy Dooney	Ireland	2:22:58	
16	Willy Van Huylenbroeck	Belgium	2:24:23	
17	Savo Alempić	Yugoslavia	2:25:50	
18	Rainer Wachenbrunner	West Germany	2:26:10	
19	John Fitzgerald	Ireland	2:28:11	
20	Ravil Kashapov	Soviet Union	2:28:49	
21	Helmut Schmuck	Austria	2:30:28	
22	Eddy Hellebuyck	Belgium	2:32:23	
23	Dick Hooper	Ireland	2:32:36	
	Yakov Tolstikov	Soviet Union	DNF	
	Spirídon Andriópoulos	Greece	DNF	
	Jan Huruk	Poland	DNF	
	Justin Gloden	Luxembourg	DNF	
	Joaquim Pinheiro	Portugal	DNF	
	Hristos Papahristos	Greece	DNF	
	Vicente Antón	Spain	DNF	
	Pascal Zilliox	France	DNF	
	Roland Wille	Liechtenstein	DNF	
	Gerard Nijboer	Netherlands	DNF	
	Tibor Baier	Hungary	DNF	
	Peter Dall	Denmark	DNF	
	Juvenal Ribeiro	Portugal	DNF	
	John Vermeule	Netherlands	DNF	

== Participation ==
According to an unofficial count, 37 athletes from 19 countries participated in the event.

- Austria (1)
- Belgium (2)
- Czechoslovakia (1)
- Denmark (1)
- France (2)
- Greece (2)
- Hungary (2)
- Ireland (3)
- Italy (3)
- Liechtenstein (1)
- Luxembourg (1)
- Netherlands (3)
- Poland (1)
- Portugal (3)
- Soviet Union (3)
- Spain (3)
- United Kingdom (1)
- West Germany (2)
- Yugoslavia (2)

== See also ==
- 1988 Men's Olympic Marathon (Seoul)
- 1990 Marathon Year Ranking
- 1991 Men's World Championships Marathon (Tokyo)
- 1992 Men's Olympic Marathon (Barcelona)
