= Salvatore Bettiol =

Italian long-distance runner

Personal information
- Born: 28 November 1961 (age 64) Volpago del Montello, Province of Treviso, Italy
- Height: 1.78 m (5 ft 10 in)
- Weight: 57 kg (126 lb)

Sport
- Country: Italy
- Sport: Athletics
- Event: Marathon
- Club: CUS Universo Ferrara

Achievements and titles
- Personal best: Marathon: 2:09:40 (1994)
Medal record
World Marathon Cup
Gold medal – first place	1987 Seoul	Team marathon
Silver medal – second place	1989 Milan	Team marathon
Bronze medal – third place	1987 Seoul	Marathon
Event / 1st / 2nd / 3rd; Venice Marathon / 2 / 0 / 0

Salvatore Bettiol (born 28 November 1961) is a retired long-distance runner from Italy.

== Biography ==
He represented his native country twice (1992 and 1996) at the Summer Olympics. He is best known for finishing in 2nd place overall at the 1988 New York Marathon, and for winning the 1987 Venice Marathon. He also finished in 4th place overall at the 1990 European Championships in Split, FR Yugoslavia.

== Achievements ==
Year	Competition	Venue	Position	Event	Notes
Representing Italy
1986	Venice Marathon	Venice, Italy	1st	Marathon	2:18:44
1987	World Championships	Rome, Italy	13th	Marathon	2:17:45
1987	Venice Marathon	Venice, Italy	1st	Marathon	2:10:01
1988	New York Marathon	New York City, United States	2nd	Marathon	2:11:41
1990	London Marathon	London, England	2nd	Marathon	2:10:40
1990	European Championships	Split, SFR Yugoslavia	4th	Marathon	2:17:45
1991	World Championships	Tokyo, Japan	6th	Marathon	2:15:58
1992	Olympic Games	Barcelona, Spain	5th	Marathon	2:14:15
1993	World Championships	Stuttgart, Germany	—	Marathon	DNF
1996	Olympic Games	Atlanta, United States	20th	Marathon	2:17:27

== National titles ==
Salvatore Bettiol has won 4 times the individual national championship.

- 2 wins in Marathon (1987, 1991)
- 2 wins in Half marathon (1986, 1988)
