= 1994 European Marathon Cup =

1994 Marathon competition held in Helsinki, Finland

The 1994 European Marathon Cup was the fifth edition of the European Marathon Cup of athletics and were held in Helsinki, Finland, inside of the 1994 European Championships.

== Results ==
Team men
#	Nations	Time
1	Spain	8:49:54
2	Portugal	8:54:55
3	France	8:57:46

Team women
#	Nations	Time
1	Italy	10:11:48
2	Romania	10:20:48
3	France	10:39:39

Individual men
Rank	Athlete	Time	Note
1st place, gold medalist(s)	Martín Fiz (ESP)	2:10:31	
2nd place, silver medalist(s)	Diego García (ESP)	2:10:46	
3rd place, bronze medalist(s)	Alberto Juzdado (ESP)	2:11:18	
4	Richard Nerurkar (GBR)	2:11:56	
5	Luigi Di Lello (ITA)	2:12:41	
6	António Rodrigues (POR)	2:12:43	
7	Manuel Matias (POR)	2:12:48	
8	Harri Hänninen (FIN)	2:13:21	
9	António Pinto (POR)	2:13:24	
10	Dominique Chauvelier (FRA)	2:13:30	

Individual women
Rank	Athlete	Time	Note
1st place, gold medalist(s)	Manuela Machado (POR)	2:29:54	
2nd place, silver medalist(s)	Maria Curatolo (ITA)	2:30:33	
3rd place, bronze medalist(s)	Adriana Barbu (ROM)	2:30:55	
4	Ornella Ferrara (ITA)	2:31:57	
5	Anuța Cătună (ROM)	2:32:51	
6	Ritva Lemettinen (FIN)	2:33:05	
7	Kirsi Rauta (FIN)	2:33:32	
8	Rosanna Munerotto (ITA)	2:34:32	
9	Anna Villani (ITA)	2:34:46	
10	Lidia Șimon (ROM)	2:36:14	

== See also ==
- 1994 European Athletics Championships – Men's Marathon
- 1994 European Athletics Championships – Women's Marathon
