= Alessio Faustini =

Italian long-distance runner (born 1960)

Personal information
- Nationality: Italian
- Born: 10 June 1960 (age 66) Rome, Italy
- Height: 1.68 m (5 ft 6 in)
- Weight: 48 kg (106 lb)

Sport
- Country: Italy
- Sport: Athletics
- Event: Marathon
- Club: G.S. Fiamme Oro

Achievements and titles
- Personal best: Marathon: 2:11:03 (1992)
Medal record
Universiade
Gold medal – first place	1983 Edmonton	Marathon
European Marathon Cup
Silver medal – second place	1988 Huy	Marathon
Bronze medal – third place	1985 Rome	Team marathon

Alessio Faustini (born 10 June 1960) is an Italian former long-distance runner.

== Biography ==
Alessio Faustini participated at one edition of the Summer Olympics (1992), he has 13 caps in national team from 1981 to 1992. He is not relative of the other Italian marathon runner Osvaldo Faustini.

== Achievements ==
Year	Competition	Venue	Position	Event	Time	Notes
1985	World Marathon Cup	(Japan) Hiroshima		Marathon	2:13:55	
1988	European Marathon Cup	(Belgium) Huy	2nd	Marathon	2:12:52	
1991	World Championships	(Japan) Tokyo	DNF	Marathon	-	
1992	Olympic Games	(Spain) Barcelona	44th	Marathon	2:21:37	
