= Roland Wille =

Liechtenstein athlete (born 1961)

Roland Wille (born 1 August 1961) is a Liechtenstein athlete who competed for his country at the 1992 Summer Olympics in Barcelona, Spain. In the Men's Marathon event he placed 68th with a time of 2:31.32. Wille was a member of the Leichtathletik Club Schaan.

== Achievements ==
- All results regarding marathon, unless stated otherwise

Year	Competition	Venue	Position	Notes
Representing Liechtenstein
1990	European Championships	Split, Yugoslavia	—	DNF
1991	World Championships	Tokyo, Japan	35th	2:48:12
1993	World Championships	Stuttgart, Germany	—	DNF
