= 1991 World Championships in Athletics – Men's marathon =

The men's marathon at the 1991 World Championships in Athletics in Tokyo, Japan was held on September 1, 1991. The race started at 18:00 local time.

== Medalists ==
Gold	Hiromi Taniguchi; Japan
Silver	Hussein Ahmed Salah; Djibouti
Bronze	Steve Spence; United States

== Records ==
Standing records prior to the 1991 World Athletics Championships
World Record	Belayneh Dinsamo	Ethiopia (ETH)	2:06:50	April 17, 1988	Rotterdam, Netherlands
Championships record	Robert de Castella	Australia (AUS)	2:10:03	August 14, 1983	Helsinki, Finland
Season best	Kōichi Morishita	Japan (JPN)	2:08:53	February 3, 1991	Ōita, Japan

== Results ==
Rank	Athlete	Nation	Result
1st place, gold medalist(s)	Hiromi Taniguchi	Japan	2:14:57
2nd place, silver medalist(s)	Hussein Ahmed Salah	Djibouti	2:15:26
3rd place, bronze medalist(s)	Steve Spence	United States	2:15:36
4	Jan Huruk	Poland	2:15:47
5	Futoshi Shinohara	Japan	2:15:52
6	Salvatore Bettiol	Italy	2:15:58
7	Maurilio Castillo	Mexico	2:16:15
8	Gelindo Bordin	Italy	2:17:03
9	Tekeye Gebrselassie	Ethiopia	2:18:37
10	Konrad Dobler	Germany	2:19:01
11	Steve Moneghetti	Australia	2:19:18
12	Sam Carey	Great Britain & N.I.	2:20:02
13	Peter Maher	Canada	2:20:31
14	Diego García	Spain	2:21:16
15	Dominique Chauvelier	France	2:21:37
16	Tonnie Dirks	Netherlands	2:22:17
17	Elphas Ginindza	Eswatini	2:22:43
18	Stephan Freigang	Germany	2:23:13
19	Kim Won-tak	South Korea	2:23:14
20	Dave Buzza	Great Britain & N.I.	2:23:24
21	Vladimir Bukhanov	Soviet Union	2:24:26
22	Motsemme Kgaotsang	Botswana	2:25:28
23	Kim Reynierse	Aruba	2:26:50
24	Martin Vrábeľ	Czechoslovakia	2:26:56
25	Gian Luigi Macina	San Marino	2:28:40
26	Steve Taylor	United States	2:29:09
27	Myint Kan	Myanmar	2:29:14
28	William Aguirre	Nicaragua	2:29:35
29	Aleksandr Vychuzhanin	Soviet Union	2:32:37
30	Alberto Cuba	Cuba	2:32:57
31	Krishna Bahadur Basnet	Nepal	2:33:13
32	Fai Yeung Ng	Hong Kong	2:34:26
33	Freddy Lujan	Bolivia	2:36:54
34	Hsu Gi-sheng	Chinese Taipei	2:37:20
35	Roland Wille	Liechtenstein	2:48:12
36	Abdillah Soilihi	Comoros	2:56:36
—	Faasalele Fuauli	Western Samoa (WSM)	DNF
—	Alessio Faustini	Italy	DNF
—	Manuel Matias	Portugal	DNF
—	Abebe Mekonnen	Ethiopia	DNF
—	Takeyuki Nakayama	Japan	DNF
—	Antoni Niemczak	Poland	DNF
—	Jörg Peter	Germany	DNF
—	Joaquim Pinheiro	Portugal	DNF
—	Francisco Romera	Spain	DNF
—	Yakov Tolstikov	Soviet Union	DNF
—	Carlos Ayala	Mexico	DNF
—	Alfredo Shahanga	Tanzania	DNF
—	Nivaldo Vieira	Brazil	DNF
—	Åke Eriksson	Sweden	DNF
—	Brad Hudson	United States	DNF
—	Mohamed Kamel Selmi	Algeria	DNF
—	Ahmed Al Hamshani	Jordan	DNF
—	Simon Mrashani	Tanzania	DNF
—	Kim Wan-ki	South Korea	DNF
—	Laurenio Beserra	Brazil	DNF
—	Jean-Luc Assemat	France	DNF
—	Tesfaye Dadi	Ethiopia	DNF
—	Daniel Böltz	Switzerland	DNF
—	Manny Lolin	Malaysia	DNF

== See also ==
- 1990 European Athletics Championships – Men's marathon
- Athletics at the 1992 Summer Olympics – Men's marathon
