= Massimo Magnani =

Italian marathon runner

Personal information
- Nationality: Italian
- Born: 4 October 1951 (age 74) Ferrara, Italy
- Height: 1.73 m (5 ft 8 in)
- Weight: 65 kg (143 lb)

Sport
- Country: Italy
- Sport: Athletics
- Event: Marathon
- Club: CUS Universo Ferrara
- Coached by: Gianpaolo Lenzi

Achievements and titles
- Personal best: Marathon: 2:11.02 (1985)
Medal record
European Marathon Cup
Gold medal – first place	1981 Agen	Team Marathon

Massimo Magnani (born 4 October 1951 in Ferrara) is a former Italian marathon runner.

He has the Italian best performance of the 30 km, established in 1982.

== Biography ==
Massimo Magnani participated at two edition of the Summer Olympics (1976 and 1980), he has 10 caps in national team from 1974 to 1985. He was technic commissioner of the Italy national athletics team till 2016.

== Achievements ==
Year	Competition	Venue	Position	Event	Performance	Note
1976	Olympic Games	(Canada) Montreal	13th	Marathon	2:16:56	
1977	Fukuoka Marathon	(Japan) Fukuoka	3rd	Fukuoka Marathon	2:13:04	
1978	Italian Athletics Championships	(Italy) Rome	1st	Italian Athletics Championships	2:16:46	
1978	European Athletics Championships	(Czech Republic) Prague	6th	European Athletics Championships	2:12:45	
1980	Olympic Games	(Soviet Union) Moscow	8th	Marathon	2:13:12	
1981	European Marathon Cup	(France) Agen	1st	European Marathon Cup	2:13:29	
1982	Italian Athletics Championships	(Italy) Rome	2nd	Italian Athletics Championships	2:11:28	
1983	Milano Internazionale	(Italy) Milan	2nd	Marathon	2:15:03	
1984	Houston Marathon	(United States) Houston	2nd	Houston Marathon	2:11:54	
1984	San Francisco Marathon	(United States) San Francisco	3rd	San Francisco Marathon	2:13:44	
1985	1985 World Marathon Cup	(Japan) Hiroshima	9th	1985 World Marathon Cup	2:11:02	

== National titles ==
Massimo Magnani has won 3 times the individual national championship.

- 2 wins in half marathon (1978, 1981)
- 1 win in marathon (1978)

== See also ==
- Italian records in athletics
