= France at the 2022 European Athletics Championships =

- Flag of France
- WA code: FRA
- National federation: French Athletics Federation

in Munich, Germany 15 August 2022 – 21 August 2022
- Competitors: 92 (55 men and 37 women) in 44 events
- Medals Ranked 22nd: Gold 0 Silver 4 Bronze 5 Total 9

European Athletics Championships appearances (overview)
- 1934; 1938; 1946; 1950; 1954; 1958; 1962; 1966; 1969; 1971; 1974; 1978; 1982; 1986; 1990; 1994; 1998; 2002; 2006; 2010; 2012; 2014; 2016; 2018; 2022; 2024

France competed at the 2022 European Athletics Championships in Munich, Germany, between 15 and 21 August 2022

== Medallists ==
Medal	Name	Event	Date
Silver	Pascal Martinot-Lagarde	Men's 110 metres hurdles	17 August
Silver	Wilfried Happio	Men's 400 metres hurdles	19 August
Silver	Rénelle Lamote	Women's 800 metres	20 August
Silver	Méba-Mickaël Zeze; Pablo Matéo; Ryan Zeze; Jimmy Vicaut	Men's 4 × 100 metres relay	21 August
Bronze	Jules Pommery	Men's long jump	16 August
Bronze	Jean-Marc Pontvianne	Men's triple jump	17 Augustv
Bronze	Just Kwaou-Mathey	Men's 110 metres hurdles	17 August
Bronze	Gilles Biron; Loïc Prévot; Téo Andant; Thomas Jordier; Simon Boypa	Men's 4 × 400 metres relay	20 August
Bronze	Yann Schrub	Men's 10,000 metres	21 August

== Results ==
France entered the following athletes.

Key

- Q = Qualified for the next round
- q = Qualified for the next round as a fastest loser or, in field events, by position without achieving the qualifying target
- NR = National record
- PB = Personal best
- SB = Season best
- N/A = Round not applicable for the event

=== Men ===
Track and road events

Athlete	Event	Heat		Semifinal		Final	
Athlete	Event	Result	Rank	Result	Rank	Result	Rank
Mouhamadou Fall	100 m	Bye		10.16	6 q	10.17	5
Jimmy Vicaut	100 m	Bye		10.18	8	Did not advance	
Méba-Mickaël Zeze	100 m	Bye		10.21	12	Did not advance	
Mouhamadou Fall	200 m	Bye		20.83	19	Did not advance	
Ryan Zeze	200 m	Bye		20.58	14	Did not advance	
Méba-Mickaël Zeze	200 m	Bye		20.47	11	Did not advance	
Thomas Jordier	400 m	45.39 PB	3 Q	45.37 PB	2 Q	45.67	8
Gilles Biron	400 m	45.82	10 Q	45.75	12	Did not advance	
Gabriel Tual	800 m	1:46.08	3 Q	1:47.70	7	Did not advance	
Benjamin Robert	800 m	1:47.66	14 Q	1:48.51	11 Q	1:45.42	5
Yanis Meziane	800 m	1:47.82	20	Did not advance			
Azeddine Habz	1500 m	3:38.47	6 q	—N/a		3:40.92	10
Baptiste Mischler	1500 m	3:39.58	14	—N/a		Did not advance	
Hugo Hay	5000 m	—N/a				13:45.63	19
Felix Bour	5000 m	—N/a				14:05.84	24
Yann Schrub	10,000 m	—N/a				27:47.13 PB	3rd place, bronze medalist(s)
Jimmy Gressier	10,000 m	—N/a				27:49.84	4
Yoann Kowal	10,000 m	—N/a				28:17.39	15
Nicolas Navarro	Marathon	—N/a				2:10:41	5
Michael Gras	Marathon	—N/a				2:12:39	10
Benjamin Choquert	Marathon	—N/a				2:15:48	21
Florian Carvalho	Marathon	—N/a				2:21:51	52
Emmanuel Roudolff	Marathon	—N/a				Did not finish	
Yohan Durand	Marathon	—N/a				Did not finish	
Nicolas Navarro; Michael Gras; Benjamin Choquert; Florian Carvalho; Emmanuel Roudolff |Yohan Durand	Marathon Cup	—N/a				6:39:08	4
Just Kwaou-Mathey	110 m hurdles	Bye		13.30	2 Q	13.30	3rd place, bronze medalist(s)
Pascal Martinot-Lagarde	110 m hurdles	Bye		13.35	4 Q	13.14 =EL	2nd place, silver medalist(s)
Sasha Zhoya	110 m hurdles	Bye		13.46	6 Q	16.51	8
Victor Coroller	400 m hurdles	49.35	1 Q	49.46	9 Q	50.46	8
Ludvy Vaillant	400 m hurdles	Bye		48.52 SB	2 Q	48.79	4
Wilfried Happio	400 m hurdles	Bye		48.89	4 Q	48.56	2nd place, silver medalist(s)
Louis Gilavert	3000 m steeplechase	8:32.26	7 Q	—N/a		8:39.62	15
Djilali Bedrani	3000 m steeplechase	8:35.57	15 q	—N/a		8:28.52	8
Mehdi Belhadj	3000 m steeplechase	8:42.38	22	—N/a		Did not advance	
Kévin Campion	20 km walk	—N/a				1:20:47 PB	6
Gabriel Bordier	20 km walk	—N/a				1:28:11	19
Aurélien Quinionn	35 km walk	—N/a				DSQ	
Méba-Mickaël Zeze; Pablo Matéo; Ryan Zeze; Jimmy Vicaut	4 × 100 m relay	38.17	2 Q	—N/a		37.94 SB	2nd place, silver medalist(s)
Gilles Biron; Loïc Prévot; Téo Andant; Thomas Jordier; Simon Boypa^{[a]}	4 × 400 m relay	3:02.09	6 Q	—N/a		2:59.64 SB	3rd place, bronze medalist(s)

Field events

Athlete	Event	Qualification		Final	
Athlete	Event	Distance	Position	Distance	Position
Sébastien Micheau	High jump	2.21	10 q	NM	
Nathan Ismar	High jump	NM		Did not advance	
Thibaut Collet	Pole vault	5.65	1 q	5.75	5
Renaud Lavillenie	Pole vault	5.65	6 q	5.65	7
Valentin Lavillenie	Pole vault	NM		Did not advance	
Jules Pommery	Long jump	7.83	6 q	8.06	3rd place, bronze medalist(s)
Augustin Bey	Long jump	7.73	13	Did not advance	
Tom Campagne	Long jump	NM		Did not advance	
Jean-Marc Pontvianne	Triple jump	16.96	3 Q	16.94	3rd place, bronze medalist(s)
Enzo Hodebar	Triple jump	16.70	6 q	16.62	7
Benjamin Compaoré	Triple jump	15.17	20	Did not advance	
Quentin Bigot	Hammer throw	77.22	6 q	77.48	7
Jean-Baptiste Bruxelle	Hammer throw	70.79	20	Did not advance	
Yann Chaussinand	Hammer throw	NM		Did not advance	
Felise Vaha'i Sosaia	Javelin throw	74.70	16	Did not advance	

Combined events – Decathlon

Athlete	Event	100 m	LJ	SP	HJ	400 m	110H	DT	PV	JT	1500 m	Final	Rank
Baptiste Thiery	Result	10.87	6.94	12.95 PB	1.90	47.66	15.10	41.93	5.40	55.07 PB	4:18.13 SB	8057 PB	9
Baptiste Thiery	Points	890	799	664	714	926	837	704	1035	664	824	8057 PB	9
Kevin Mayer	Result	11.67	Did not start									Did not finish	
Kevin Mayer	Points	717	Did not start									Did not finish	

=== Women ===
Track and road events

Athlete	Event	Heat		Semifinal		Final	
Athlete	Event	Result	Rank	Result	Rank	Result	Rank
Mallory Leconte	100 m	11.49	12 Q	DQ		Did not advance	
Shana Grebo	200 m	23.00	2 Q	23.13	9 Q	23.06	6
Gémima Joseph	200 m	23.21	10 Q	23.36	13	Did not advance	
Amandine Brossier	400 m	51.26 SB	2 Q	51.21 PB	9	Did not advance	
Sokhna Lacoste	400 m	52.62	14	Did not advance			
Rénelle Lamote	800 m	2:02.22	7 Q	2:00.23	1 Q	1:59.49	2nd place, silver medalist(s)
Agnès Raharolahy	800 m	2:07.02	29	Did not advance			
Aurore Fleury	1500 m	4:07.82	23	—N/a		Did not advance	
Manon Trapp	5000 m	—N/a				16:15.44	19
Alessia Zarbo	10,000 m	—N/a				32:36.28	12
Mekdes Woldu	10,000 m	—N/a				32:39.54	13
Melody Julien	Marathon	—N/a				2:32:19	14
Laura Valette	100 m hurdles	13.30	8 Q	13.20	18	Did not advance	
Cyréna Samba-Mayela	100 m hurdles	Bye		12.82	7 Q	13.05	7
Laëticia Bapté	100 m hurdles	Bye		13.16	15	Did not advance	
Camille Seri	400 m hurdles	56.18 PB	4 Q	Did not finish		Did not advance	
Flavie Renouard	3000 m steeplechase	9:51.49	17	—N/a		Did not advance	
Alexa Lemitre	3000 m steeplechase	9:58.49	21	—N/a		Did not advance	
Clémence Beretta	20 km walk	—N/a				1:30:37 NR	6
Camille Moutard	20 km walk	—N/a				1:34:04	11
Eloise Terrec	20 km walk	—N/a				1:33:16	10
Floriane Gnafoua; Gémima Joseph; Helene Parisot; Mallory Leconte	4 × 100 m relay	43.24 SB	3 Q	—N/a		Did not finish	
Sokhna Lacoste; Marjorie Veyssiere; Diana Iscaye; Amandine Brossier	4 × 400 m relay	3:29.64	11	—N/a		Did not advance	

Field events

Athlete	Event	Qualification		Final	
Athlete	Event	Distance	Position	Distance	Position
Solène Gicquel	High jump	1.87	12 q	1.86	13
Marie-Julie Bonnin	Pole vault	4.40	10 q	4.55 PB	6
Margot Chevrier	Pole vault	4.40	10 q	4.40	10
Ninon Chapelle	Pole vault	4.40	14	Did not advance	
Yanis David	Long jump	6.57	9 q	6.51	8
Maelly Dalmat	Long jump	NM		Did not advance	
Mélina Robert-Michon	Discus throw	58.85	9 q	60.60	8
Amanda Ngandu-Ntumba	Discus throw	54.70	22	Did not advance	
Alexandra Tavernier	Hammer throw	68.99	4 q	66.60	12
Rose Loga	Hammer throw	66.27	20	Did not advance	
Alizée Minard	Javelin throw	52.50	22	Did not advance	

Combined events – Heptathlon

Athlete	Event	100H	HJ	SP	200 m	LJ	JT	800 m	Final	Rank
Léonie Cambours	Result	13.52	1.77	11.95	24.73	NM	36.35	2:22.20	4949	14
Léonie Cambours	Points	1047	941	658	912	0	597	794	4949	14

^{a} Athletes who participated in the heats only.
