= Gelindo Bordin =

Italian marathon runner (born 1959)

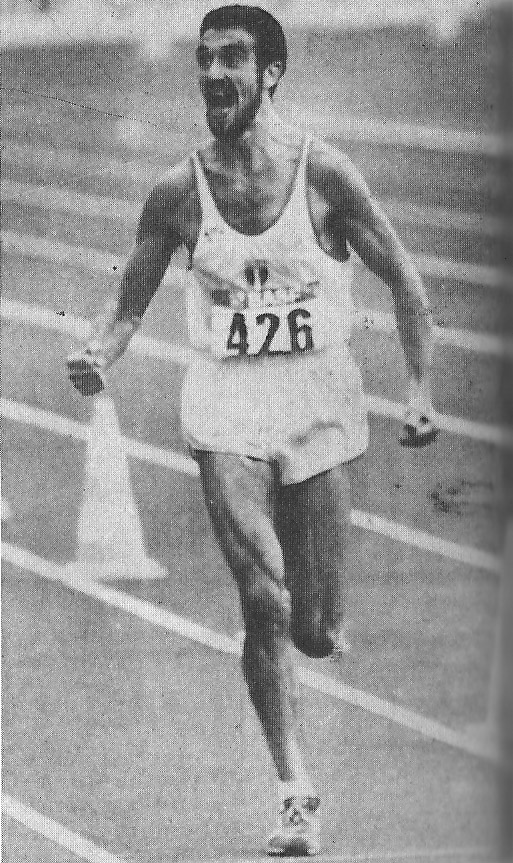
- Bordin in 1986

Personal information
- Nationality: Italian
- Born: 2 April 1959 (age 67) Vicenza, Italy
- Height: 1.80 m (5 ft 11 in)
- Weight: 68 kg (150 lb)

Sport
- Country: Italy
- Sport: Athletics
- Event: Marathon
- Club: Atalanta Paf Alitrans Verona

Achievements and titles
- Personal best: Marathon: 2:08:19 (1990)
Medal record
Men's athletics
Representing Italy
Olympic Games
Gold medal – first place	1988 Seoul	Marathon
World Championships
Bronze medal – third place	1987 Rome	Marathon
European Championships
Gold medal – first place	1986 Stuttgart	Marathon
Gold medal – first place	1990 Split	Marathon
European Marathon Cup
Bronze medal – third place	1985 Rome	Team marathon

Gelindo Bordin (born 2 April 1959) is an Italian former long-distance runner, winner of the marathon race at the 1988 Summer Olympics. He is the first Italian to have won an Olympic gold in the marathon and the only male to win both the Boston Marathon and the Olympic gold medal in this event.

== Biography ==
Born in Vicenza, Italy, Bordin made his first breakthrough at the 1986 European Championships, where he won a gold medal in the marathon. His next international competition was the 1987 World Championships in Rome. The marathon race was held on a very hot and humid day. Bordin wisely held back from the leaders in the early stages. He caught up with the leaders after the 35 km mark and finally managed to hold on to the third place, winning a bronze medal.

At the Olympic marathon in Seoul, Bordin stayed with the leaders from the start. After 25 km (16 mi) the leading pack started to distance itself from the rest of the runners. With 5 km (3.1 mi) remaining, only three runners remained: Bordin, Wakiihuri, the Kenyan and the Djiboutan, Salah. With 3 km (1.9 mi) to go, Salah surged forward taking Wakihuri with him and establishing a comfortable gap between the two and Bordin. At this late stage of the race the move seemed a decisive one, leading most viewers and sport commentators to reasonably conclude that the gold and silver medals were to be decided between Wakihuri and Salah, with Bordin hopefully holding on to his bronze medal position. But Bordin's sheer courage and determination gradually saw him lessen the gap and finally catch up with the leaders once again, much to the delight of the Italian commentators and fans who were now ecstatic. He first passed Wakihuri and then the tiring Salah with 1 km (0.62 mi) to go, gradually increasing his lead and achieving the ultimate prize of Olympic gold.

Bordin successfully defended his European marathon title in 1990, becoming the first man to win the title twice, but at the 1991 World Championships in Tokyo, he finished in a disappointing eighth place. Bordin attempted to defend his Olympic title at 1992 Summer Olympics in Barcelona, but he strained a groin muscle jumping over a fallen runner just after the halfway mark, and failed to finish. Shortly after the 1992 Summer Olympics Bordin decided to retire.

Bordin is the only male to win both the Boston Marathon and an Olympic gold medal in the marathon. He won the Boston Marathon in 1990 and describes the victory as his "second greatest run, after winning the Olympics".

== Achievements ==
Year	Competition	Venue	Position	Event	Notes
1984	Milano Marathon	Milan, Italy	1st	Marathon	2:13:20
1985	1985 World Marathon Cup	Hiroshima, Japan	12th	Marathon	2:11:29
1985	1985 European Marathon Cup	Rome, Italy	7th	Marathon	2:15:13
1986	European Championships	Stuttgart, West Germany	1st	Marathon	2:10:54
1987	Rome City Marathon	Rome, Italy	1st	Marathon	2:16:03
1987	World Championships	Rome, Italy	3rd	Marathon	2:12:40
1988	Boston Marathon	Boston, United States	4th	Marathon	2:09:27
1988	Olympic Games	Seoul, South Korea	1st	Marathon	2:10:32
1989	New York City Marathon	New York, United States	3rd	Marathon	2:09:40
1990	Boston Marathon	Boston, United States	1st	Marathon	2:08:19
1990	European Championships	Split, FR Yugoslavia	1st	Marathon	2:14:02
1990	Venice Marathon	Venice, Italy	1st	Marathon	2:13:42
1991	World Championships	Tokyo, Japan	8th	Marathon	2:17:03
1992	Olympic Games	Barcelona, Spain	—	Marathon	DNF

== See also ==
- List of winners of the Boston Marathon
- Italian all-time lists – Marathon
- FIDAL Hall of Fame
