= Dominique Chauvelier =

French long-distance runner

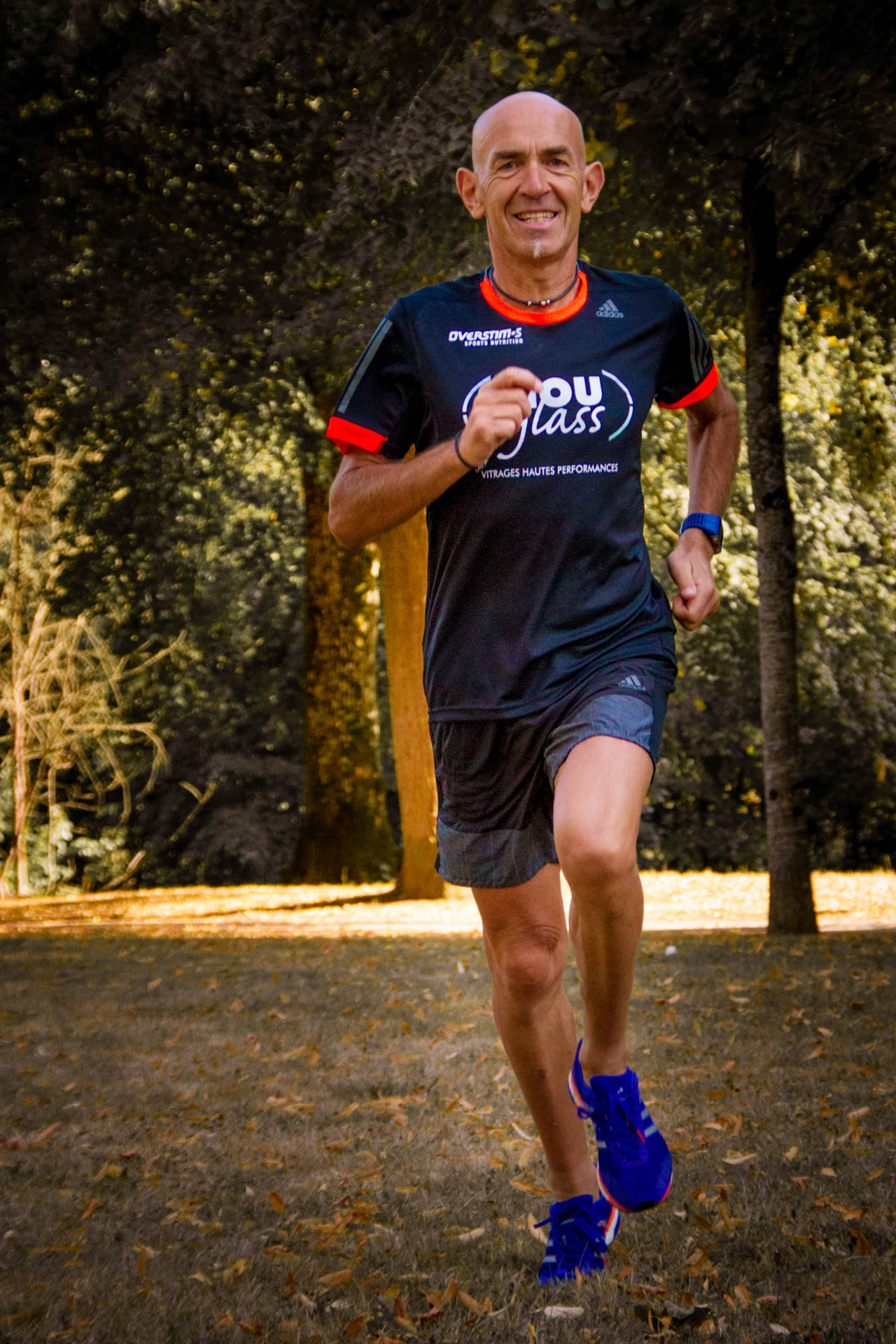
- Dominique Chauvelier Racing

Medal record

Men's athletics

Representing France

European Championships
Bronze medal – third place	1990 Split	Marathon

Dominique Chauvelier (born 3 August 1956) is a French former long-distance runner who competed in marathons. His greatest international achievement was a bronze medal in the marathon at the 1990 European Athletics Championships.

Born in La Flèche, he represented France at the 1992 Barcelona Olympics and was a five-time participant in the marathon at the World Championships in Athletics (1983, 1991, 1993, 1995, 1997). He also made four appearances in the marathon at the European Athletics Championships and seven appearances at the IAAF World Cross Country Championships. He led the French team to bronze medals at the 1989 World Marathon Cup and 1994 European Marathon Cup.

He was a four-time national champion in the marathon. He holds the French records for the 25,000 m and 30,000 m track events.

Among his wins on the professional circuit were the 1995 BIG 25 Berlin and the 1989 Reims Marathon. He is a five-time champion of the Marvejols-Mende Half Marathon and ran nine times at the New York City Marathon between 1992 and 2006 (his best result being 16th). As of 2016, he continues to compete as a masters category athlete.

== Personal bests ==
- 5000 metres – 15:43.32 min (2007)
- 10,000 metres – 28:50.88 min (1985)
- One hour run – 20,269 m (1989)
- 25,000 metres – 1:15:56.7 min (1992) NR
- 30,000 metres – 1:31:53.2 min (1992) NR
- 10K run – 31:19 min (2000)
- ½ marathon – 66:04 min (2001)
- Marathon – 2:11:24 (1989)

All information taken from All-Athletics.

== International competitions ==
Year	Competition	Venue	Position	Event	Notes
1981	IAAF World Cross Country Championships	Madrid, Spain	112th	Senior race	36:59
1981	IAAF World Cross Country Championships	Madrid, Spain	9th	Team	402 pts
1981	European Marathon Cup	Agen, France	41st	Marathon	2:24:46
1982	European Championships	Athens, Greece	14th	Marathon	2:22:40
1983	European Marathon Cup	Laredo, Spain	9th	Marathon	2:14:22
1983	World Championships	Helsinki, Finland	46th	Marathon	2:23:25
1984	IAAF World Cross Country Championships	East Rutherford, United States	36th	Senior race	34:25
1984	IAAF World Cross Country Championships	East Rutherford, United States	9th	Team	371 pts
1985	IAAF World Cross Country Championships	Lisbon, Portugal	173rd	Senior race	?
1985	IAAF World Cross Country Championships	Lisbon, Portugal	12th	Team	441 pts
1985	World Marathon Cup	Athens, Greece	11th	Marathon	2:15:58
1989	IAAF World Cross Country Championships	Stavanger, Norway	38th	Senior race	41:47
1989	IAAF World Cross Country Championships	Stavanger, Norway	4th	Team	187 pts
1989	World Marathon Cup	Milan, Italy	5th	Marathon	2:11:24
1989	World Marathon Cup	Milan, Italy	3rd	Team	6:38:51
1990	European Championships	Split, Yugoslavia	3rd	Marathon	2:15:20
1991	IAAF World Cross Country Championships	Antwerp, Belgium	198th	Senior race	37:41
1991	IAAF World Cross Country Championships	Antwerp, Belgium	14th	Team	571 pts
1991	World Championships	Tokyo, Japan	15th	Marathon	2:21:37
1992	Olympic Games	Barcelona, Spain	31st	Marathon	2:19:09
1993	World Marathon Cup	San Sebastián, Spain	17th	Marathon	2:12:58
1993	World Championships	Stuttgart, Germany	25th	Marathon	2:27:26
1994	European Championships	Helsinki, Finland	10th	Marathon	2:13:30
1994	European Championships	Helsinki, Finland	3rd	Team	8:57:46
1995	IAAF World Cross Country Championships	Durham, United Kingdom	111th	Senior race	36:51
1995	IAAF World Cross Country Championships	Durham, United Kingdom	10th	Team	422 pts
1995	World Championships	Gothenburg, Sweden	39th	Marathon	2:27:30
1996	IAAF World Cross Country Championships	Stellenbosch, South Africa	128th	Senior race	37:35
1996	IAAF World Cross Country Championships	Stellenbosch, South Africa	11th	Team	478 pts
1996	World Half Marathon Championships	Palma de Mallorca, Spain	59th	Half marathon	1:06:21
1996	European Mountain Running Trophy	Llanberis, Wales	26th	11 km	1:09:29
1996	World Mountain Running Trophy	Telfes, Austria	32nd	11 km	1:02:51
1997	World Championships	Athens, Greece	38th	Marathon	2:26:06
1998	European Championships	Budapest, Hungary	—	Marathon	DNF
2008	World Masters Athletics Indoor Championships	Clermont-Ferrand, France	2nd	M50 Cross country	25:41
2008	World Masters Athletics Indoor Championships	Clermont-Ferrand, France	2nd	M50 3000 m	9:09.90
2008	World Masters Athletics Indoor Championships	Clermont-Ferrand, France	3rd	M50 Half marathon	1:08:52

== National titles ==
- French Athletics Championships
  - 25K: 1990
  - Marathon: 1981, 1990, 1991, 1993

== Circuit wins ==
- Vignoble d'Alsace Marathon: 2005
- BIG 25 Berlin: 1995
- Val de Loire Marathon: 1995
- Marvejols-Mende Half Marathon: 1993, 1990, 1989, 1984, 1981
- Maroilles 20K: 1993
- Foulées du Gois: 1990
- Nice Marathon: 1990
- Reims à Toutes Jambes: 1989
- Lake Annecy Marathon: 1983
- Helsinki Marathon: 1982

== See also ==
- List of marathon national champions (men)
- List of European Athletics Championships medalists (men)
- France at the 1992 Summer Olympics
