= Gianni Poli =

Italian long-distance runner

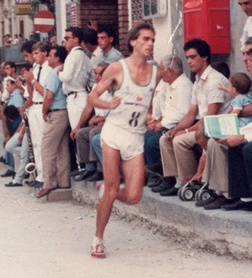

Personal information
- Full name: Pier Giovanni Poli
- Nationality: Italian
- Born: 5 November 1957 (age 68) Lumezzane, Italy
- Height: 1.80 m (5 ft 11 in)
- Weight: 68 kg (150 lb)

Sport
- Country: Italy
- Sport: Athletics
- Event: Marathon
- Club: S. Rocchino Brescia
- Coached by: Gabriele Rosa

Achievements and titles
- Personal best: Marathon: 2:09.33 (1988)
Medal record
Men's athletics
Representing Italy
European Championships
Silver medal – second place	1990 Split	Marathon
World Marathon Cup
Silver medal – second place	1989 Milan	Team marathon
Bronze medal – third place	1989 Milan	Marathon
European Marathon Cup
Silver medal – second place	1983 Laredo	Team marathon
Bronze medal – third place	1983 Laredo	Marathon

Pier Giovanni "Gianni" Poli (born 5 November 1957 in Lumezzane) is a former Italian long-distance runner who won the New York City Marathon in 1986.

He also won the silver in medal in the marathon at the 1990 European Athletics Championships.

== Biography ==
Gianni Poli participated at one edition of the Summer Olympics (1988), he has 12 caps in national team from 1979 to 1990.

== Achievements ==
Year	Competition	Venue	Position	Event	Notes
Representing Italy
1982	European Championships	Athens, Greece	13th	Marathon	2:22:27
1983	World Championships	Helsinki, Finland	7th	Marathon	2:11:05
1986	European Championships	Stuttgart, West Germany	13th	Marathon	2:15:25
1986	New York City Marathon	New York City, United States	1st	Marathon	2:11:06
1988	Olympic Games	Seoul, South Korea	19th	Marathon	2:16:07
1990	European Championships	Split, Yugoslavia	2nd	Marathon	2:14:55

== National titles ==
Gianni Poli has won one time the individual national championship.

- 1 win in marathon (1984)

== See also ==
- Italian all-time lists - Marathon
