= Osvaldo Faustini =

Italian long-distance runner

Personal information
- Born: July 27, 1956 (age 69) Villanuova sul Clisi, Italy
- Height: 1.68 m (5 ft 6 in)
- Weight: 48 kg (106 lb)

Sport
- Country: Italy
- Sport: Athletics
- Event: Marathon
- Club: G.S. Fiamme Oro

Achievements and titles
- Personal bests: 3000 m st: 8:39.8 (1989); Marathon: 2:12:57 (1987)
Medal record
World Marathon Cup
Gold medal – first place	1987 Seoul	Team marathon
Silver medal – second place	1989 Milan	Team marathon

Osvaldo Faustini (born 25 July 1956) is an Italian former long-distance runner.

== Biography ==
Osvaldo Faustini has 5 caps in national team from 1983 to 1991. He is not relative of the other Italian marathon runner Alessio Faustini.

== National titles ==
Osvaldo Faustini has won 2 times the individual national championship.

- 2 wins in Marathon (1985, 1986)
