= France at the European Athletics Championships =

- WA code: FRA
- Medals Ranked 4th: Gold 73 Silver 74 Bronze 72 Total 219

European Athletics Championships appearances (overview)
- 1934; 1938; 1946; 1950; 1954; 1958; 1962; 1966; 1969; 1971; 1974; 1978; 1982; 1986; 1990; 1994; 1998; 2002; 2006; 2010; 2012; 2014; 2016; 2018; 2022; 2024

France at the European Athletics Championships has participated in all editions of the European Athletics Championships, held since the first edition of 1934 European Athletics Championships.

== Medal count ==
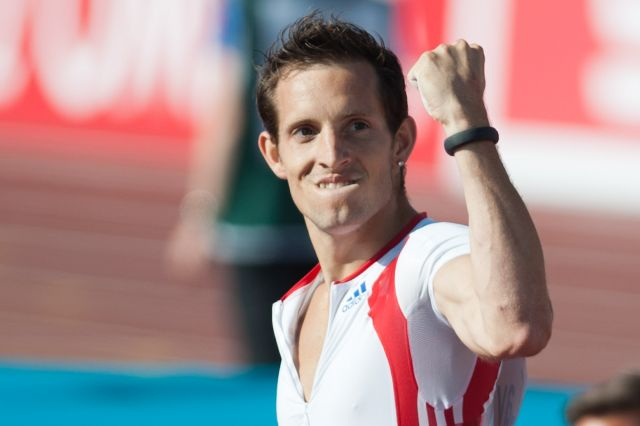
Renaud Lavillenie.

Edition	Gold	Silver	Bronze	Total
1934	1	3	1	5
1938	1	1	1	3
1946	3	4	4	11
1950	4	8	3	15
1954	1	1	1	3
1958	0	0	1	1
1962	2	2	0	4
1966	4	3	7	14
1969	3	4	0	7
1971	2	1	0	3
1974	2	2	0	4
1978	1	0	1	2
1982	0	0	3	3
1986	1	1	2	4
1990	3	2	5	10
1994	4	3	2	9
1998	2	1	1	4
2002	4	1	2	7
2006	4	1	3	8
2010	8	6	4	18
2012	5	4	5	14
2014	9	8	8	25
2016	2	5	3	10
2018	3	4	3	10
2022	0	4	5	9
2024	4	5	7	16
Total	73	74	72	219

== See also ==
- Athletics in France
- Fédération française d'athlétisme
