= 1994 European Athletics Championships – Men's marathon =

Men's marathon at the European Athletics Championships

These are the official results of the Men's marathon event at the 1994 European Championships in Helsinki, Finland. The race was held on 14 August 1994.

== Medalists ==
Gold	Martín Fiz; Spain (ESP)
Silver	Diego García; Spain (ESP)
Bronze	Alberto Juzdado; Spain (ESP)

== Abbreviations ==
- All times shown are in hours:minutes:seconds

DNS	did not start
NM	no mark
WR	world record
AR	area record
NR	national record
PB	personal best
SB	season best

== Final ranking ==
Rank	Athlete	Time	Note
1st place, gold medalist(s)	Martín Fiz (ESP)	2:10:31	CR
2nd place, silver medalist(s)	Diego García (ESP)	2:10:46	
3rd place, bronze medalist(s)	Alberto Juzdado (ESP)	2:11:18	PB
4	Richard Nerurkar (GBR)	2:11:56	
5	Luigi Di Lello (ITA)	2:12:41	
6	António Rodrigues (POR)	2:12:43	
7	Manuel Matias (POR)	2:12:48	
8	Harri Hänninen (FIN)	2:13:21	
9	António Pinto (POR)	2:13:24	
10	Dominique Chauvelier (FRA)	2:13:30	
11	Noureddine Sobhi (FRA)	2:13:43	
12	Oleg Strizhakov (RUS)	2:14:23	
13	Jan Huruk (POL)	2:14:27	
14	Konrad Dobler (GER)	2:14:28	
15	Kurt Stenzel (GER)	2:14:34	
16	Borislav Dević (Independent European Participants)	2:14:41	
17	Grzegorz Gajdus (POL)	2:14:55	
18	Bruno Le Stum (FRA)	2:14:57	
19	Rainer Wachenbrunner (GER)	2:15:11	
20	Yakov Tolstikov (RUS)	2:15:32	
21	Jean-Luc Assemat (FRA)	2:15:36	
22	Dov Kremer (ISR)	2:15:45	
23	Joaquim Silva (POR)	2:16:04	
24	Terje Naess (NOR)	2:16:10	
25	Rafaello Alliegro (ITA)	2:16:16	
26	Vladimir Bukhanov (UKR)	2:16:34	
27	Peter Whitehead (GBR)	2:16:40	
28	Marti ten Kate (NED)	2:16:48	
29	Lars Andervang (SWE)	2:16:59	
30	Walter Durbano (ITA)	2:17:09	
31	William Foster (GBR)	2:17:12	
32	Antoni Peña (ESP)	2:17:19	
33	Eduard Tukhbatullin (RUS)	2:17:26	
34	Wiesław Perszke (POL)	2:17:35	
35	Carsten Eich (GER)	2:17:54	
36	Bruno Léger (FRA)	2:18:33	
37	Spyros Andriopoulos (GRE)	2:19:01	
38	Jacek Kasprzyk (POL)	2:19:39	
39	Jean-Baptiste Protais (FRA)	2:19:47	
40	Walter af Donner (SWE)	2:19:55	
41	Michel de Maat (NED)	2:20:12	
42	Toomas Tarm (EST)	2:20:56	
43	Knut Hegvold (NOR)	2:21:18	
44	Uwe Honsdorf (GER)	2:21:22	
45	Juuso Rainio (FIN)	2:21:41	
46	Anders Szalkai (SWE)	2:21:42	
47	Jukka Vähä-Vahe (FIN)	2:22:32	
48	Pavel Loskutov (EST)	2:22:49	
49	Cihangir Demirell (TUR)	2:23:02	
50	Petri Kuusinen (FIN)	2:23:13	
51	Gerard Kappert (NED)	2:24:16	
52	Steve Brace (GBR)	2:24:41	
53	Heinz-Bernhardt Bürger (GER)	2:24:35	
54	Kaupo Sabre (EST)	2:24:39	
55	Gazi Aşıkoğlu (TUR)	2:25:08	
56	John Vermeule (NED)	2:27:06	
57	Jan Swenson (SWE)	2:27:21	
58	Teppo Jalonen (FIN)	2:27:57	
59	Timo-Pekka Kalermo (FIN)	2:28:09	
60	Islam Dugum (BIH)	2:29:19	
DID NOT FINISH (DNF)
—	Česlovas Kundrotas (LTU)	DNF	
—	Rodrigo Gavela (ESP)	DNF	
—	Fernando Couto (POR)	DNF	
—	Andrew Green (GBR)	DNF	
—	Sergey Struganov (RUS)	DNF	
—	Kjell-Erik Ståhl (SWE)	DNF	
—	Mirko Vindiš (SLO)	DNF	
—	Frank Bjørkli (NOR)	DNF	
—	Mark Flint (GBR)	DNF	
—	Mukhamet Nazipov (RUS)	DNF	
—	Aart Stigter (NED)	DNF	
—	Graziano Calvaresi (ITA)	DNF	
—	Gert-Inge Nilsson (SWE)	DNF	
—	Severino Bernardini (ITA)	DNF	
—	Luca Barzaghi (ITA)	DNF	
—	José Esteban Montiel (ESP)	DNF	
—	Aleksey Zhelonkin (RUS)	DNF	
—	Encho Kolev (BUL)	DNF	
—	Khristo Stefanov (BUL)	DNF	

=== Team results ===
Rank	Nation	Time	Notes
1st place, gold medalist(s)	Spain	8:49.54	
2nd place, silver medalist(s)	Portugal	8:54.59	
3rd place, bronze medalist(s)	France	8:57.46	
4	Germany	9:02.07	
5	Poland	9:06.36	
6	Great Britain	9:10.09	
7	Finland	9:20.47	

== Participation ==
According to an unofficial count, 79 athletes from 22 countries participated in the event.

- Bosnia and Herzegovina (1)
- Bulgaria (2)
- Estonia (3)
- Finland (6)
- France (6)
- Germany (6)
- Greece (1)
- Great Britain (6)
- Independent European Participants (1)
- Israel (1)
- Italy (6)
- Lithuania (1)
- Netherlands (5)
- Norway (3)
- Poland (4)
- Portugal (5)
- Russia (6)
- Slovenia (1)
- Spain (6)
- Sweden (6)
- Turkey (2)
- Ukraine (1)

== See also ==
- 1992 Men's Olympic Marathon (Barcelona)
- 1994 European Marathon Cup
