= Jose Reveyn =

Belgian long-distance runner

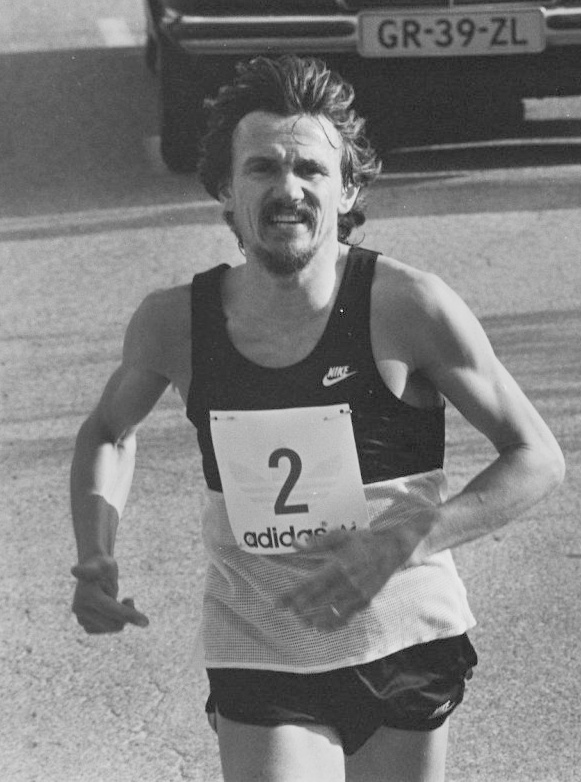
- Jose Reveyn in 1982

Personal information
- Born: 14 September 1947 (age 78)

Sport
- Sport: Athletics

Jose Reveyn (born 14 September 1947) is a Belgian long-distance runner who won the Amsterdam Marathon race in 1985 in a time of 2:19:24. He clocked his best marathon time of 2:12:26 at the Amsterdam Marathon of 1982, when he finished 9 seconds behind Cor Vriend.
