= Juan Carlos Traspaderne =

Spanish long-distance runner

Juan Carlos Traspaderne de la Fuente (born 2 February 1956) is a retired male long-distance runner from Spain, who represented his native country at the 1984 Summer Olympics in the men's marathon. He set his personal best (2:11:34) on 14 August 1983 at the men's marathon in Helsinki, Finland, clocking a national record at that time. Traspaderne won the national marathon title in 1983.

== Achievements ==
Year	Competition	Venue	Position	Event	Notes
Representing Spain
1983	World Championships	Helsinki, Finland	12th	Marathon	2:11:34
1984	Olympic Games	Los Angeles, United States	—	Marathon	DNF
