= Bettina Sabatini =

Italian marathon runner

Personal information
- Nationality: Italian
- Born: 21 March 1966 (age 60) Aalborg, Denmark
- Height: 1.70 m (5 ft 7 in)
- Weight: 48 kg (106 lb)

Sport
- Country: Italy
- Sport: Athletics
- Event: Marathon
- Club: CUS NCR Milano

Achievements and titles
- Personal best: Marathon: 2:30:29 (1991)
Medal record
Event	1st	2nd	3rd
Florence Marathon	1	0	0

Bettina Sabatini (born 21 March 1966 in Aalborg, Denmark) is a retired female marathon runner from Italy.

She represented her native country at the 1992 Summer Olympics in Barcelona, Spain, where she ended up in 23rd place in the women's marathon race. She set her personal best (2:30:29) in 1991. She has 6 caps in national team from 1988 to 1994.

== Achievements ==
Year	Competition	Venue	Position	Event	Notes
Representing Italy
1992	Olympic Games	Barcelona, Spain	23rd	Marathon	2:50:09
1993	World Championships	Stuttgart, Germany	—	Marathon	DNF
1994	European Championships	Helsinki, Finland	21st	Marathon	2:34.46
2003	Florence Marathon	Florence, Italy	1st	Marathon	2:33:51
