= Xie Lihua =

Chinese long-distance runner

Personal information
- Nationality: Chinese
- Born: 19 July 1965 (age 60)

Sport
- Sport: Long-distance running
- Event: 10,000 metres

Xie Lihua (Chinese: 谢丽华; born 19 July 1965) is a Chinese long-distance runner. She competed in the women's 10,000 metres at the 1988 Summer Olympics.
