= José Montiel (athlete) =

Spanish athlete

José Esteban Montiel Gómez (born 20 September 1962 in Ogijares, Granada) is a former long-distance athlete from Spain who finished in 32nd position (2:19.15,00) in the Men's Marathon at the 1992 Summer Olympics in Barcelona, Spain.

== Achievements ==
- All results regarding marathon, unless stated otherwise

Year	Competition	Venue	Position	Notes
Representing Spain
1990	European Championships	Split, FR Yugoslavia	5th	2:17:51
1992	Olympic Games	Barcelona, Spain	32nd	2:19:15
1994	European Championships	Helsinki, Finland	—	DNF
