= Li Juan (runner) =

Chinese long-distance runner

Personal information
- Nationality: Chinese
- Born: 5 October 1968 (age 57)

Sport
- Sport: Long-distance running
- Event: Marathon

Li Juan (栗 娟, born 5 October 1968) is a Chinese long-distance runner. She competed in the women's marathon at the 1988 Summer Olympics. She won the 1987 Hong Kong Marathon in a time of 2:37:35.
