= Emma Scaunich =

Italian long-distance runner

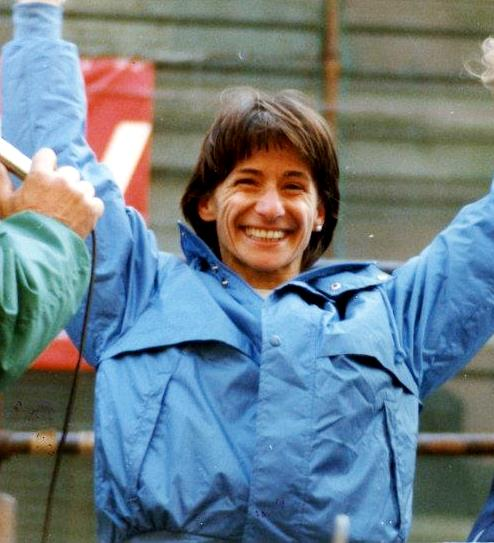
- Scaunich at the Maratonina 4 porte in Pieve di Cento in 1987.

Personal information
- Native name: Emma Scaunigh
- National team: Italy: 13 caps (1984-1992)
- Born: 1 March 1954 (age 72) Udine, Italy
- Height: 1.63 m (5 ft 4 in)
- Weight: 48 kg (106 lb)

Sport
- Country: Italy
- Sport: Athletics
- Event: Marathon
- Club: Cus Universo Ferrara

Achievements and titles
- Personal best: Marathon: 2:29.46 (1988)
Medal record
World Marathon Cup
Gold medal – first place	1985 Hiroshima	Team marathon
European Marathon Cup
Silver medal – second place	1985 Rome	Team marathon
International Marathons
Event	1st	2nd	3rd
Chicago Marathon	0	1	0
Venice Marathon	2	0	0
Barcelona Marathon	1	0	0
Italian Marathon	1	0	0
Turin Marathon	1	0	0
Total	5	1	0

Emma Scaunich, but real surname is Scaunigh, (1 March 1954) is a former Italian long-distance runner who specialized in the marathon race.

== Career ==
She won two medals, at senior level, at the International athletics competitions. She participated at one edition of the Summer Olympics (1992) and one of the IAAF World Championships in Athletics (1987). She has 13 caps in national team from 1984 to 1992.

== Achievements ==
Year	Competition	Venue	Position	Event	Performance	Note
1987	World Championships	(Italy) Rome	20th	Marathon	2:44:32	
1990	European Championships	(Socialist Federal Republic of Yugoslavia) Split	4th	Marathon	2:37:19	
1992	Olympic Games	(Spain) Barcelona	18th	Marathon	2:46:14	

== National titles ==
She has won 5 times consecutively the individual national championship.

- 5 wins in marathon (1989, 1990, 1991, 1992, 1993)

== See also ==
- Italian team at the running events
- Italy at the 1992 Summer Olympics
