= Jerzy Skarżyński (athlete) =

Polish long-distance runner

Jerzy Skarżyński (born 13 January 1956) is a retired Polish runner who specialized in the marathon.

He finished fifteenth in the marathon at the 1986 European Championships. He won the Warsaw Marathon in 1989 and the Leipzig Marathon in 1991.

His personal best time was 2.11.42 hours, achieved in April 1986 in Debno.
