= Giampaolo Messina =

Italian marathon runner

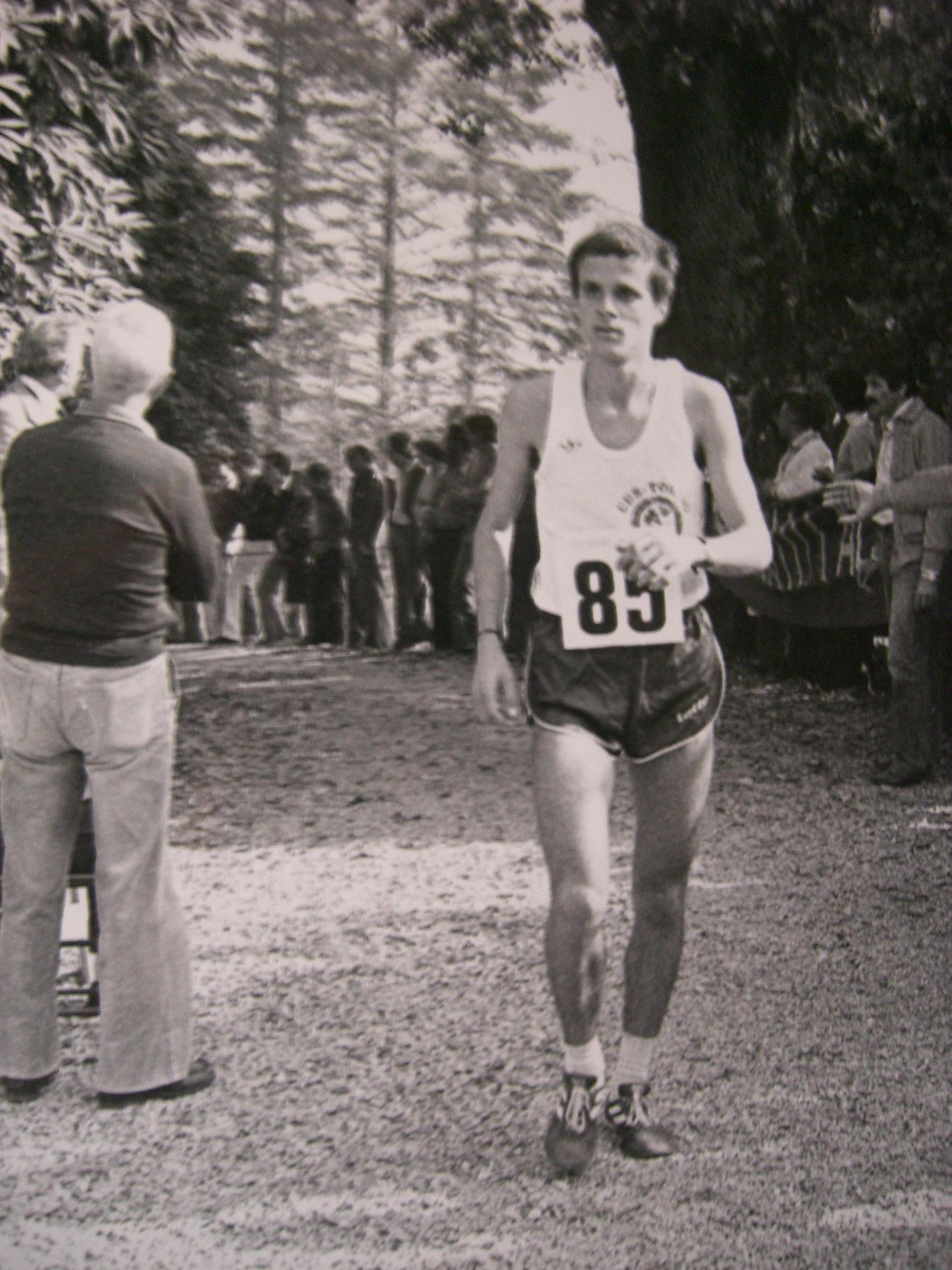

Personal information
- Nationality: Italian
- Born: 7 July 1957 (age 68) Bari, Italy

Sport
- Country: Italy
- Sport: Athletics
- Event: Marathon

Achievements and titles
- Personal best: Marathon: 2:12:42 (1982)

Giampaolo Messina (born 10 September 1957) is an Italian marathon runner. He competed in the 1983 World Championships in Athletics.

== Personal best ==
- Marathon: 2:12:42 - (United States) Chicago, 26 September 1982

== Achievements ==
Year	Competition	Venue	Position	Event	Time	Notes
1982	European Championships	(Greece) Athens	7th	Marathon	2:18:20	
1983	World Championships	(Finland) Helsinki	DNF	Marathon	No time	

== National titles ==
He won two national championships at senior level.

- Half marathon: 1979
- Marathon: 1981

== See also ==
- Italy at the 1982 European Athletics Championships
