= Alfonso Abellán =

Spanish long-distance runner

Personal information
- Nationality: Spanish
- Born: 21 July 1951 (age 74) Villacarrillo, Spain

Sport
- Sport: Long-distance running
- Event: Marathon

Alfonso Abellán López (born 21 July 1951) is a Spanish former long-distance runner. He competed in the men's marathon at the 1988 Summer Olympics.
