= Alexandre Gonzalez =

French long-distance runner

Personal information
- Born: 16 March 1951 (age 75) Decazeville, Aveyron, France
- Height: 183 cm (6 ft 0 in)
- Weight: 71 kg (157 lb)

Sport
- Country: France
- Sport: Long-distance running
- Event: Marathon
Medal record
Men's athletics
Representing France
European Indoor Championships
Gold medal – first place	1981 Grenoble	3000 m

Alexandre Gonzalez (born 16 March 1951) is a French long-distance runner. He competed in the men's marathon at the 1988 Summer Olympics.
