= Katrin Dörre-Heinig =

German long-distance runner

Personal information
- Full name: Juana Katrin Dörre-Heinig
- Born: 6 October 1961 (age 64) Leipzig, East Germany
- Height: 170 cm (5 ft 7 in)
- Weight: 57 kg (126 lb)
Medal record
Women's athletics
Representing East Germany
Olympic Games
Bronze medal – third place	1988 Seoul	Marathon
Representing Germany
World Championships
Bronze medal – third place	1991 Tokyo	Marathon

Katrin Dörre-Heinig (German: [kaˈtʁiːn ˈdœʁə ˈhaɪnɪç]; née Dörre; born 6 October 1961) is a former athlete from Germany, who competed mainly in the marathon. She won extensively on the road running circuit, having taken titles at races including the Tokyo Marathon, Berlin Marathon and the London Marathon; she won three times consecutively in London from 1992 to 1994.

Dörre was born in Leipzig, Bezirk Leipzig, and competed for East Germany at the 1988 Summer Olympics in Seoul, where she won the bronze medal in the classic race over 42.195 km. Dörre is a triple winner of the Osaka Ladies Marathon and has a record of 35 sub 2:34 times, with a personal best of 2:24:35 (1999, course record of the Hamburg Marathon). She was the bronze medallist in the marathon at the 1991 World Championships in Athletics and returned at the 1993 World Championships in Athletics, but managed only sixth place on her second attempt. She just missed out on the podium with a fourth-place finish in the marathon at the 1996 Summer Olympics

Since 1992 Dörre has been married to her trainer Wolfgang Heinig. Her daughter, Katharina Heinig, has followed in her footsteps and she won the Köln Marathon in her debut over the marathon distance.

Over the course of her career Dörre participated in 45 marathons and won 24. She planned to run the Chicago marathon in 1985, but did not run there, to avoid a face off with Joan Benoit, Rosa Mota and Ingrid Kristiansen. Up to this point, she won 7 marathons in a row and went on to win 3 more.

In 2012, Dörre started a coaching career. As of 2021 she is the German national coach for marathon running.

== Achievements ==
- All results regarding marathon, unless stated otherwise

Year	Competition	Venue	Position	Notes
Representing East Germany
1984	Osaka Ladies Marathon	Osaka, Japan	1st	2:31:41
1984	Tokyo Marathon	Tokyo, Japan	1st	2:33:23
1985	Tokyo Marathon	Tokyo, Japan	1st	2:34:21
1986	Nagoya Marathon	Nagoya, Japan	1st	2:29:33
1986	European Championships	Stuttgart, West Germany	—	DNF
1987	Tokyo Marathon	Tokyo, Japan	1st	2:25:24
1988	Olympic Games	Seoul, South Korea	3rd	2:26:21
Representing Germany
1991	Osaka Ladies Marathon	Osaka, Japan	1st	2:27:43
1991	World Championships	Tokyo, Japan	3rd	2:30:10
1992	London Marathon	London, United Kingdom	1st	2:29:39
1992	Olympic Games	Barcelona, Spain	5th	2:26:48
1993	London Marathon	London, United Kingdom	1st	2:27:09
1993	World Championships	Stuttgart, Germany	6th	2:35:20
1994	London Marathon	London, United Kingdom	1st	2:32:34
1994	Berlin Marathon	Berlin, Germany	1st	2:25:15
1994	European Championships	Helsinki, Finland	—	DNF
1995	Frankfurt Marathon	Frankfurt, Germany	1st	2:31:31
1996	Osaka Ladies Marathon	Osaka, Japan	1st	2:26:04
1996	Olympic Games	Atlanta, United States	4th	2:28:45
1996	Frankfurt Marathon	Frankfurt, Germany	1st	2:28:33
1997	Osaka Ladies Marathon	Osaka, Japan	1st	2:25:57
1997	Frankfurt Marathon	Frankfurt, Germany	1st	2:26:48
1998	Hamburg Marathon	Hamburg, Germany	1st	2:25:21
1999	Hamburg Marathon	Hamburg, Germany	1st	2:24:35
2000	Hamburg Marathon	Hamburg, Germany	2nd	2:33:10
