= Jürgen Eberding =

German long-distance runner (born 1955)

Personal information
- Nationality: German
- Born: 3 December 1955 (age 70) Halberstadt, Bezirk Magdeburg, East Germany

Sport
- Sport: Long-distance running
- Event: Marathon

Jürgen Eberding (born 3 December 1955) is a German long-distance runner. He competed in the marathon at the 1980 Summer Olympics in Moscow representing East Germany. He ran a time of 2:18:04 and placed 21st in the race.
