= 1978 European Athletics Championships – Men's marathon =

Men's marathon at the European Athletics Championships

The men's marathon at the 1978 European Athletics Championships was held in Prague, then Czechoslovakia, on 3 September 1978.

== Medalists ==
Gold	Leonid Moseyev; Soviet Union
Silver	Nikolay Penzin; Soviet Union
Bronze	Karel Lismont; Belgium

== Results ==
=== Final ===
3 September

Rank	Name	Nationality	Time	Notes
1st place, gold medalist(s)	Leonid Moseyev	Soviet Union	2:11:57.5	CR
2nd place, silver medalist(s)	Nikolay Penzin	Soviet Union	2:11:59.0	
3rd place, bronze medalist(s)	Karel Lismont	Belgium	2:12:07.7	
4	Waldemar Cierpinski	East Germany	2:12:20.0	
5	Cătălin Andreica	Romania	2:12:29.4	NR
6	Massimo Magnani	Italy	2:12:45.3	
7	Hans-Joachim Truppel	East Germany	2:12:54.3	
8	Jürgen Eberding	East Germany	2:13:39.7	
9	David Cannon	Great Britain	2:14:31.7	
10	Mihaíl Koúsis	Greece	2:14:41.3	
11	Satymkul Dzhumanazarov	Soviet Union	2:14:43.3	
12	Göran Bengtsson	Sweden	2:15:01.9	
13	Tony Simmons	Great Britain	2:15:31.5	
14	Ferenc Szekeres	Hungary	2:15:45.0	
15	Ryszard Marczak	Poland	2:15:47.8	
16	Michelangelo Arena	Italy	2:16:09.2	
17	Vlastimil Zwiefelhofer	Czechoslovakia	2:16:37.6	
18	Henri Schoofs	Belgium	2:16:49.5	
19	Josef Jánský	Czechoslovakia	2:16:53.0	
20	Reinhard Leibold	West Germany	2:16:56.3	
21	Jean-Marie Ancion	Belgium	2:17:24.5	
22	Ko van den Weyden	Netherlands	2:17:32.8	
23	Bernard Bobes	France	2:17:48.0	
24	Aarno Ristimäki	Finland	2:18:17.8	
25	Colin Taylor	Great Britain	2:18:44.5	
26	Antonio Romero	Spain	2:19:26.4	
27	Patrick Hooper	Ireland	2:20:28.5	
28	Manuel Paiva	Portugal	2:20:49.4	
29	Richard Hooper	Ireland	2:21:00.2	
30	Cor Vriend	Netherlands	2:21:25.2	
31	Henry Olsen	Norway	2:21:35.1	
32	Sadık Salman	Turkey	2:22:47.4	
33	Jørn Lauenborg	Denmark	2:23:14.8	
34	Roelof Veld	Netherlands	2:23:38.3	
35	András Fancsali	Hungary	2:23:39.7	
36	Veli Ballı	Turkey	2:25:56.2	
37	Kyriakos Lazaridis	Greece	2:32:16.9	
	Paolo Accaputo	Italy	DNF	
	Jörgen Hein	Denmark	DNF	
	Lars Enqvist	Sweden	DNF	
	Jan Fjærestad	Norway	DNF	
	Bjarne Brøndum	Denmark	DNF	
	Miroslav Krsek	Czechoslovakia	DNF	
	Ryszard Kopijasz	Poland	DNF	
	Håkan Spik	Finland	DNF	
	Aniceto Simões	Portugal	DNF	
	Fernand Kolbeck	France	DNF	
	Øyvind Dahl	Norway	DNF	
	Jochen Schirmer	West Germany	DNF	

== Participation ==
According to an unofficial count, 49 athletes from 21 countries participated in the event.

- Belgium (3)
- Czechoslovakia (3)
- Denmark (3)
- East Germany (3)
- Finland (2)
- France (2)
- Greece (2)
- Hungary (2)
- Ireland (2)
- Italy (3)
- Netherlands (3)
- Norway (3)
- Poland (2)
- Portugal (2)
- Romania (1)
- Soviet Union (3)
- Spain (1)
- Sweden (2)
- Turkey (2)
- Great Britain (3)
- West Germany (2)
