= 1980 in marathon running =

This page lists the World Best Year Performances in the year 1980 in the Marathon for both men and women. One of the main events during this season were the 1980 Summer Olympics in Moscow, Soviet Union, where the final of the men's competition was held on Friday August 1, 1980. The competition had an entry list of 76 competitors, with 53 runners actually finishing the race.

Norway's Grete Waitz clocked 2:25:41 winning the New York City Marathon on October 26, 1980, but her time was disputed and therefore not recognized as a world record because remeasurements of a nearly identical course in 1981 was 150 m short.

== Men ==
=== Records ===
Standing records prior to the 1980 season in track and field
World Record	Derek Clayton (AUS)	2:08:33.6	May 30, 1969	Antwerp, Belgium

=== 1980 World Year Ranking ===
Rank	Time	Athlete	Venue	Date	Note
1	2:09:01	Gerard Nijboer (NED)	Amsterdam, Netherlands	26-05-1980	NR
2	2:09:41	Alberto Salazar (USA)	New York, United States	26-10-1980	
3	2:09:45	Toshihiko Seko (JPN)	Fukuoka, Japan	07-12-1980	
4	2:09:49	Takeshi So (JPN)	Fukuoka, Japan	07-12-1980	
5	2:10:05	Kunimitsu Itō (JPN)	Fukuoka, Japan	07-12-1980	
6	2:10:09	Garry Henry (AUS)	Fukuoka, Japan	07-12-1980	Personal Best
7	2:10:13.9	Rodolfo Gómez (MEX)	New York, United States	26-10-1980	
8	2:10:18.6	Anthony Sandoval (USA)	Buffalo, United States	24-05-1980	Personal Best
9	2:10:19.9	Garry Bjorklund (USA)	Duluth, United States	21-06-1980	Personal Best
10	2:10:23	Shigeru So (JPN)	Fukuoka, Japan	07-12-1980	
11	2:10:24	Waldemar Cierpinski (GDR)	Fukuoka, Japan	07-12-1980	
12	2:10:29	Kirk Pfeffer (USA)	Fukuoka, Japan	07-12-1980	Personal Best
13	2:10:40.3	Benji Durden (USA)	Buffalo, United States	24-05-1980	
14	2:10:44	Robert de Castella (AUS)	Fukuoka, Japan	07-12-1980	
15	2:10:47	Dick Quax (NZL)	Eugene, United States	07-09-1980	Personal Best
16	2:10:52	Go Chun-Son (PRK)	Essonne, France	16-03-1980	Personal Best
17	2:10:54.1	Kyle Heffner (USA)	Buffalo, United States	24-05-1980	Personal Best
18	2:10:58	Vladimir Kotov (URS)	Moscow, Soviet Union	24-05-1980	Personal Best
19	2:10:59	Robert Hodge (USA)	Eugene, United States	07-09-1980	Personal Best
20	2:11:00	Ron Tabb (USA)	Metairie, United States	10-02-1980	
21	2:11:02	Tommy Persson (SWE)	Columbus, United States	16-11-1980	Personal Best
22	2:11:09	Dave Smith (USA)	Eugene, United States	07-09-1980	Personal Best
23	2:11:16	Satymkul Dzhumanazarov (URS)	Moscow, Soviet Union	24-05-1980	Personal Best
24	2:11:21.8	David Cannon (ENG)	Montréal, Canada	06-09-1980	Personal Best
25	2:11:22	Richard Callison (USA)	Metairie, United States	10-02-1980	Personal Best

== Women ==
=== Records ===
Standing records prior to the 1980 season in track and field
World Record	Christa Vahlensieck (FRG)	2:34:47.5	September 10, 1977	Berlin, West Germany

=== 1980 World Year Ranking ===
Rank	Time	Athlete	Venue	Date	Note
1	2:30:27	Joyce Smith (ENG)	Tokyo, Japan	16-11-1980	
2	2:30:57.1	Patti Catalano (USA)	Montréal, Canada	06-09-1980	
3	2:30:58	Jacqueline Gareau (CAN)	Tokyo, Japan	16-11-1980	
4	2:31:23	Joan Samuelson (USA)	Auckland, New Zealand	03-02-1980	
5	2:31:42	Lorraine Moller (NZL)	Eugene, United States	07-09-1980	
6	2:32:29	Marja Wokke (NED)	Eugene, United States	07-09-1980	
7	2:34:29	Allison Roe (NZL)	Eugene, United States	07-09-1980	
8	2:35:57	Vreni Forster (SUI)	Sandbach, United Kingdom	22-06-1980	
9	2:36:02	Nancy Conz (USA)	London, United Kingdom	03-08-1980	
10	2:36:47	Christa Vahlensieck (FRG)	Waldkraiburg, West Germany	15-05-1980	
11	2:37:27	Joëlle Audibert (FRA)	Montataire, France	12-10-1980	
12	2:37:39	Linda Staudt (CAN)	London, United Kingdom	03-08-1980	
13	2:38:04	Charlotte Teske (FRG)	Waldkraiburg, West Germany	15-05-1980	
14	2:38:45	Ingrid Kristiansen (NOR)	Stockholm, Sweden	23-08-1980	
15	2:39:10	Lyubov Putilova (URS)	Uzhgorod, Soviet Union	05-10-1980	
16	2:39:17	Gillian Horovitz (ENG)	Boston, United States	21-04-1980	
17	2:39:22	Laurie Binder (USA)	Boston, United States	21-04-1980	
18	2:39:29	Sylviane Levesque (FRA)	Montataire, France	12-10-1980	
19	2:39:49	Jane Wipf (USA)	Honolulu, United States	07-12-1980	
20	2:40:35.7	Dorthe Rasmussen (DEN)	Miami, United States	12-01-1980	
21	2:41:01	Marty Cooksey (USA)	London, United Kingdom	03-08-1980	
22	2:41:14.9	Martha Sartain (USA)	Dallas, United States	06-12-1980	
23	2:41:22	Magda Ilands (BEL)	Berchem, Belgium	12-09-1980	
24	2:41:44	Beth Guerin (USA)	London, United Kingdom	03-08-1980	
25	2:41:47	Chantal Langlacé (FRA)	Montataire, France	12-10-1980	
