= Athletics at the 1980 Summer Olympics – Men's marathon =

Men's marathon at the Games of the XXII Olympiad
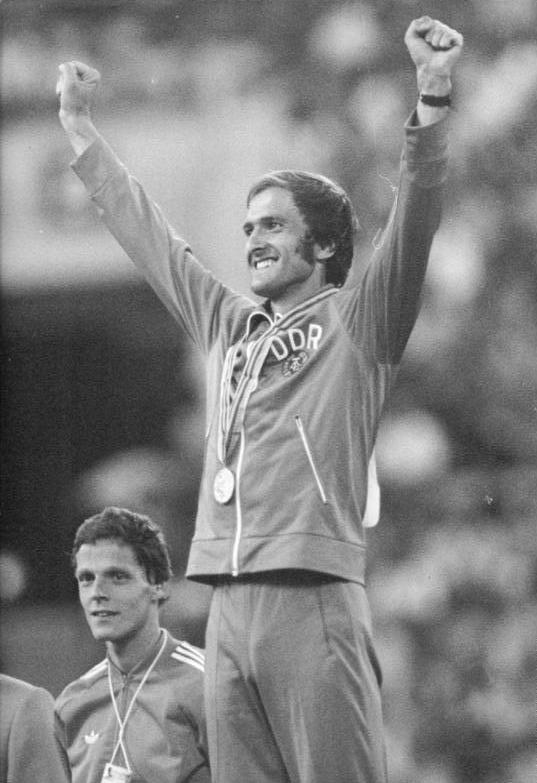
- Waldemar Cierpinski celebrating his gold medal. Left behind him Gerard Nijboer.
- Venue: Central Lenin Olympic Stadium, Moscow
- Date: 1 August
- Competitors: 74 from 40 nations
- Winning time: 2:11:03

Medalists
1st place, gold medalist(s)		Waldemar Cierpinski; East Germany
2nd place, silver medalist(s)		Gerard Nijboer; Netherlands
3rd place, bronze medalist(s)		Satymkul Dzhumanazarov; Soviet Union

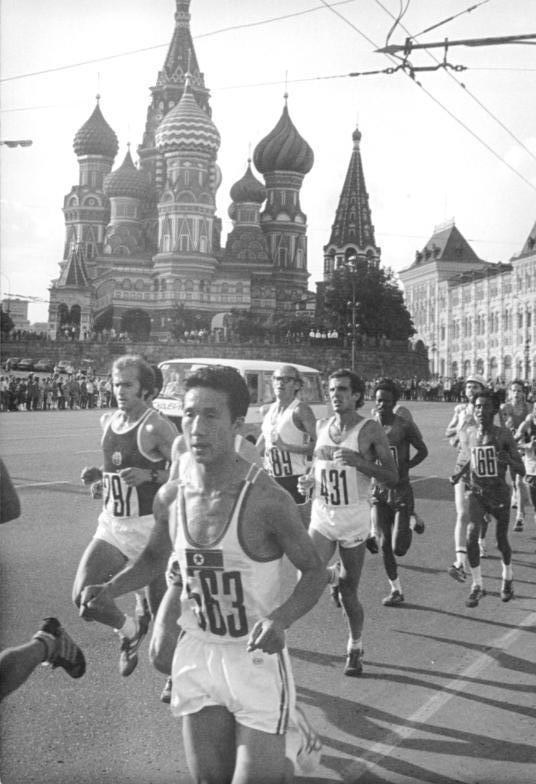
Runners pass in front of Saint Basil's Cathedral. Winner Waldemar Cierpinski is on the left.

The men's marathon at the 1980 Summer Olympics in Moscow, USSR had an entry list of 76 competitors, with 74 athletes from 40 nations starting and 53 runners finishing the race held on Friday 1 August 1980. The maximum number of athletes per nation had been set at three since the 1930 Olympic Congress. The event was won by Waldemar Cierpinski of East Germany, the second man to successfully defend Olympic gold in the marathon (after Abebe Bikila in 1960 and 1964). Both the Netherlands (Gerard Nijboer's silver) and the Soviet Union (Satymkul Dzhumanazarov's bronze) won their first men's Olympic marathon medals. The winning margin was 17 seconds.

== Background ==
This was the 19th appearance of the event, which is one of 12 athletics events to have been held at every Summer Olympics. Returning runners from the 1976 marathon included defending champion Waldemar Cierpinski of East Germany, bronze medalist (and 1972 silver medalist) Karel Lismont of Belgium, fifth-place finisher (and two-time doubler in the 5000 metres and 10000 metres) Lasse Virén of Finland, seventh-place finisher Leonid Moseyev of the Soviet Union, and tenth-place finisher Henri Schoofs of Belgium. The two strongest challengers against a Cierpinski repeat were Bill Rodgers of the United States (1975 and 1978–80 Boston winner, 1976–79 New York winner, 1977 Fukuoka winner, and 1976 Olympian) and Toshihiko Seko of Japan (1979–1980 Fukuoka winner). Both men, however, were kept out of the games due to the American-led boycott.

Algeria, the Republic of the Congo, Lebanon, Lesotho, Libya, Madagascar, the Seychelles, and Zimbabwe each made their first appearance in Olympic men's marathons. Great Britain made its 17th appearance, most of any nation competing but one behind the boycotting United States.

== Competition format and course ==
As all Olympic marathons, the competition was a single race. The marathon distance of 42,195 km was run over a "very flat" out-and-back route along the Moskva river.

== Records ==
These were the standing world and Olympic records prior to the 1980 Summer Olympics.

World record	Derek Clayton (AUS)	2:08:33.6	Antwerp, Belgium	30 May 1969
Olympic record	Waldemar Cierpinski (GDR)	2:09:55.0	Montreal, Canada	31 July 1976

No new world or Olympic bests were set during the competition.

== Schedule ==
All times are Moscow Time (UTC+3)

Date	Time	Round
Friday, 1 August 1980	17:15	Final

== Results ==
Rank	Athlete	Nation	Time
1st place, gold medalist(s)	Waldemar Cierpinski	East Germany	2:11:03
2nd place, silver medalist(s)	Gerard Nijboer	Netherlands	2:11:20
3rd place, bronze medalist(s)	Satymkul Dzhumanazarov	Soviet Union	2:11:35
4	Vladimir Kotov	Soviet Union	2:12:05
5	Leonid Moseyev	Soviet Union	2:12:14
6	Rodolfo Gómez	Mexico	2:12:39
7	Dereje Nedi	Ethiopia	2:12:44
8	Massimo Magnani	Italy	2:13:12
9	Karel Lismont	Belgium	2:13:27
10	Robert de Castella	Australia	2:14:31
11	Hans-Joachim Truppel	East Germany	2:14:55
12	Ferenc Szekeres	Hungary	2:15:18
13	Marc Smet	Belgium	2:16:00
14	Emmanuel Ndiemandoi	Tanzania	2:16:47
15	Gidamis Shahanga	Tanzania	2:16:47
16	Anacleto Pinto	Portugal	2:17:04
17	Domingo Tibaduiza	Colombia	2:17:06
18	Rik Schoofs	Belgium	2:17:28
19	Kjell-Erik Ståhl	Sweden	2:17:44
20	Michael Koussis	Greece	2:18:02
21	Jürgen Eberding	East Germany	2:18:04
22	Eleuterio Antón	Spain	2:18:16
23	Leodigard Martin	Tanzania	2:18:21
24	Moges Alemayehu	Ethiopia	2:18:40
25	Jules Randrianarivelo (Note: also competed at the 1984 Summer Olympics)	Madagascar	2:19:23
26	Zbigniew Pierzynka	Poland	2:20:03
27	Koh Chun-Son	North Korea	2:20:08
28	Chris Wardlaw	Australia	2:20:42
29	Li Jong-hyung	North Korea	2:21:10
30	Tommy Persson	Sweden	2:21:11
31	Hari Chand	India	2:22:08
32	Håkan Spik	Finland	2:22:24
33	Choe Chang-Sop	North Korea	2:22:42
34	Luis Barbosa	Colombia	2:22:58
35	Marco Marchei	Italy	2:23:21
36	Vincent Rakabaele	Lesotho	2:23:29
37	Baikuntha Manandhar	Nepal	2:23:51
38	Dick Hooper	Ireland	2:23:53
39	Josef Steiner	Austria	2:24:24
40	Joseph Peter	Switzerland	2:24:53
41	Cor Vriend	Netherlands	2:26:41
42	Pat Hooper	Ireland	2:30:28
43	Buumba Halwand	Zambia	2:36:51
44	Issa Chetoui	Libya	2:38:01
45	Mukunda Hari Shrestha	Nepal	2:38:52
46	Baba Ibrahim Suma-Keita	Sierra Leone	2:41:20
47	Soe Khin	Burma	2:41:41
48	Damiano Musonda	Zambia	2:42:11
49	Enemri Najem Al-Marghani	Libya	2:42:27
50	Nguyễn Quyễn	Vietnam	2:44:37
51	Tapfumaneyi Jonga	Zimbabwe	2:47:17
52	Emmanuel M'Pioh	Republic of the Congo	2:48:17
53	Abel Nkhoma	Zimbabwe	2:53:35
—	Shivnath Singh	India	DNF
—	Ryszard Marczak	Poland	DNF
—	Andrzej Sajkowski	Poland	DNF
—	Vlastimil Zwiefelhofer	Czechoslovakia	DNF
—	Radamés González	Cuba	DNF
—	Dave Black	Great Britain	DNF
—	Bernie Ford	Great Britain	DNF
—	Lasse Virén	Finland	DNF
—	Jean-Michel Charbonnel	France	DNF
—	Albert Marie	Seychelles	DNF
—	Abdelmadjid Mada	Algeria	DNF
—	Gerard Barrett	Australia	DNF
—	Göran Högberg	Sweden	DNF
—	Josef Jánský	Czechoslovakia	DNF
—	Nabil Chouéry	Lebanon	DNF
—	Ian Thompson	Great Britain	DNF
—	Jouni Kortelainen	Finland	DNF
—	Patrick Chiwala	Zambia	DNF
—	Kebede Balcha	Ethiopia	DNF
—	Jørn Lauenborg	Denmark	DNF
—	Kenneth Hlasa	Lesotho	DNF
—	Laswell Ngoma	Zimbabwe	DNS
—	John Treacy	Ireland	DNS

== See also ==
- 1980 Marathon Year Ranking
- 1982 Men's European Championships Marathon (Athens)
- 1983 Men's World Championships Marathon (Helsinki)
- 1986 Men's European Championships Marathon (Stuttgart)
