= 1982 European Athletics Championships – Men's marathon =

Men's marathon at the European Athletics Championships

These are the official results of the Men's marathon event at the 1982 European Championships in Athens, Greece, held on 12 September 1982.

== Medalists ==
Gold	Gerard Nijboer; Netherlands (NED)
Silver	Armand Parmentier; Belgium (BEL)
Bronze	Karel Lismont; Belgium (BEL)

== Abbreviations ==
- All times shown are in hours:minutes:seconds

DNS	did not start
NM	no mark
WR	world record
AR	area record
NR	national record
PB	personal best
SB	season best

== Final ranking ==
Rank	Athlete	Time	Note
1st place, gold medalist(s)	Gerard Nijboer (NED)	2:15:16	
2nd place, silver medalist(s)	Armand Parmentier (BEL)	2:15:51	
3rd place, bronze medalist(s)	Karel Lismont (BEL)	2:16:04	
4	Pertti Tiainen (FIN)	2:16:27	
5	Jukka Toivola (FIN)	2:17:31	
6	Waldemar Cierpinski (GDR)	2:17:50	
7	Ryszard Marczak (POL)	2:17:53	
8	Giampaolo Messina (ITA)	2:18:20	
9	Øyvind Dahl (NOR)	2:19:49	
10	Kjell-Erik Ståhl (SWE)	2:20:36	
11	Dick Hooper (IRL)	2:20:51	
12	David Cannon (GBR)	2:21:33	
13	Giovanni Poli (ITA)	2:22:27	
14	Dominique Chauvelier (FRA)	2:22:40	
15	Janos Szekeres (HUN)	2:22:41	
16	Leonid Moseyev (URS)	2:24:00	
17	Mehmet Terzi (TUR)	2:24:06	
18	Richard Umberg (SUI)	2:24:54	
19	Delfim Moreira (POR)	2:26:08	
20	Michael Koussis (GRE)	2:26:22	
21	Bernard Bobes (FRA)	2:26:37	
22	Ralf Salzmann (FRG)	2:27:24	
23	Freddy Vandervennet (BEL)	2:27:44	
24	Vadim Sidorov (URS)	2:31:29	
25	Theofanis Tsimingatos (GRE)	2:35:41	
DID NOT FINISH (DNF)
—	Richard Kopijasz (POL)	DNF	
—	Tommy Persson (SWE)	DNF	
—	Allan Zachariassen (DEN)	DNF	
—	Svend-Erik Kristensen (DEN)	DNF	
—	Kyriakos Lazaridis (GRE)	DNF	
—	Cor Vriend (NED)	DNF	
—	Santiago de la Parte (ESP)	DNF	
—	Niilo Kemppe (FIN)	DNF	
—	Steve Kenyon (GBR)	DNF	
—	Vladimir Kotov (URS)	DNF	

== Participation ==
According to an unofficial count, 35 athletes from 20 countries participated in the event.

- Belgium (3)
- Denmark (2)
- East Germany (1)
- Finland (3)
- France (2)
- Greece (3)
- Hungary (1)
- Ireland (1)
- Italy (2)
- Netherlands (2)
- Norway (1)
- Poland (2)
- Portugal (1)
- Soviet Union (3)
- Spain (1)
- Sweden (2)
- Switzerland (1)
- Turkey (1)
- United Kingdom (2)
- West Germany (1)

== See also ==
- 1980 Men's Olympic Marathon (Moscow)
- 1982 Marathon Year Ranking
- 1983 Men's World Championships Marathon (Helsinki)
- 1984 Men's Olympic Marathon (Los Angeles)
- 1987 Men's World Championships Marathon (Rome)
- 1988 Men's Olympic Marathon (Seoul)
