= 1983 World Championships in Athletics – Men's marathon =

The Men's Marathon at the inaugural 1983 World Championships in Helsinki, Finland was held on August 14, 1983.

== Medalists ==
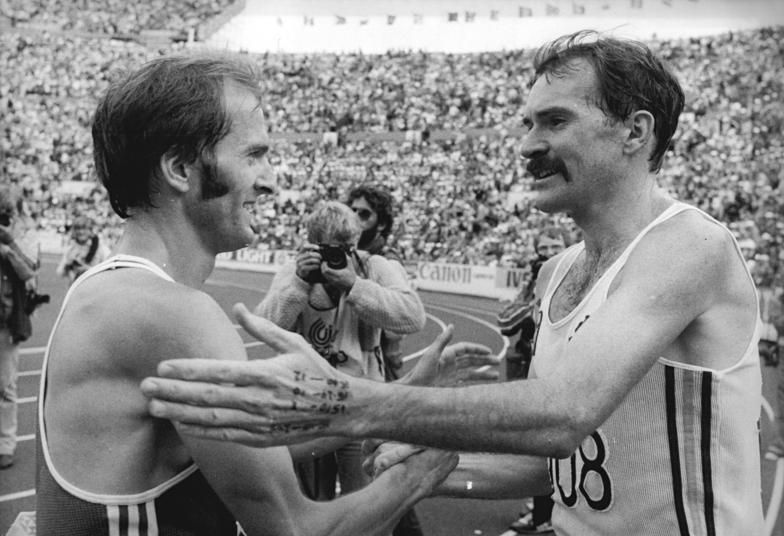
Gold medallist Robert de Castella (right) shakes hands with bronze medallist Waldemar Cierpinski after the race

Gold	Robert de Castella; Australia (AUS)
Silver	Kebede Balcha; Ethiopia (ETH)
Bronze	Waldemar Cierpinski; East Germany (GDR)

== Abbreviations ==
- All times shown are in hours:minutes:seconds

DNS	did not start
NM	no mark
WR	world record
WL	world leading
AR	area record
NR	national record
PB	personal best
SB	season best

== Records ==
Standing records prior to the 1983 World Athletics Championships
World Record	Robert de Castella (AUS)	2:08:18	December 6, 1981	Fukuoka, Japan
Event Record	New event			
Season Best	Robert de Castella (AUS)	2:08:37	April 9, 1983	Rotterdam, Netherlands
Broken records at the 1983 World Athletics Championships
Event Record	Robert de Castella (AUS)	2:10:03	August 14, 1983	Helsinki, Finland

== Final ranking ==
Rank	Athlete	Time	Note
1st place, gold medalist(s)	Robert de Castella (AUS)	2:10:03	
2nd place, silver medalist(s)	Kebede Balcha (ETH)	2:10:27	
3rd place, bronze medalist(s)	Waldemar Cierpinski (GDR)	2:10:37	
4	Kjell-Erik Ståhl (SWE)	2:10:38	NR
5	Agapius Masong (TAN)	2:10:42	
6	Armand Parmentier (BEL)	2:10:57	
7	Gianni Poli (ITA)	2:11:05	NR
8	Hugh Jones (GBR)	2:11:15	
9	Karel Lismont (BEL)	2:11:24	
10	Stig Roar Husby (NOR)	2:11:29	NR
11	Art Boileau (CAN)	2:11:30	
12	Juan Carlos Traspaderne (ESP)	2:11:34	NR
13	Marco Marchei (ITA)	2:11:47	
14	Pertti Tiainen (FIN)	2:12:11	
15	Juma Ikangaa (TAN)	2:13:11	
16	Ryszard Marczak (POL)	2:13:20	
17	Svend-Erik Kristensen (DEN)	2:13:34	
18	Ron Tabb (USA)	2:13:38	
19	Henrik Jørgensen (DEN)	2:14:10	
20	Hans Joachim Truppel (GDR)	2:14:20	
21	Ricardo Ortega (ESP)	2:14:46	
22	Tommy Persson (SWE)	2:14:57	
23	Bruno Lafranchi (SUI)	2:14:58	
24	Dave Edge (CAN)	2:15:43	
25	Yuriy Pleshkov (URS)	2:15:50	
26	Øyvind Dahl (NOR)	2:16:02	
27	Paul Ballinger (NZL)	2:16:06	
28	Jürgen Eberding (GDR)	2:16:55	
29	Gerard Nijboer (NED)	2:16:59	
30	Frederik Vandervennet (BEL)	2:17:11	
31	Trevor Wright (NZL)	2:17:31	
32	Mehmet Terzi (TUR)	2:17:56	
33	Delfim Moreira (POR)	2:18:27	
34	Li Jong-Hyong (PRK)	2:18:51	
35	Yoshihiro Nishimura (JPN)	2:18:56	
36	Cidálio Caetano (POR)	2:19:21	
37	John Skøvbjerg (DEN)	2:19:44	
38	Jeff Coole (AUS)	2:20:25	
39	Benji Durden (USA)	2:20:38	
40	So Chang-Sik (PRK)	2:20:43	
41	Wilson Theleso (BOT)	2:21:36	NR
42	Hideki Kita (JPN)	2:21:37	
43	Baikuntha Manandhar (NEP)	2:21:43	
44	Henrik Sandström (FIN)	2:21:56	
45	Rudi Verriet (NED)	2:22:07	
46	Dominique Chauvelier (FRA)	2:23:25	
47	Djama Robleh (DJI)	2:24:04	
48	Gerry Helme (GBR)	2:25:02	
49	Sam Hlawe (SWZ)	2:26:42	
50	Jan-Iwar Westlund (SWE)	2:27:05	
51	Carlos Carvajal (CHI)	2:27:30	
52	Don Greig (NZL)	2:27:37	
53	Luis Tipán (ECU)	2:28:30	
54	Palmireno Benjamin Campos (BRA)	2:29:41	
55	Jan Fjærestad (NOR)	2:30:58	
56	Tavares Silva (POR)	2:31:31	
57	Syrja Dalipi (ALB)	2:31:40	
58	Raymond Swan (BER)	2:33:20	
59	Chang-Ming Chen (TPE)	2:34:00	
60	Ágúst Þorsteinsson (ISL)	2:34:05	
61	José Jaime Hernández (ESA)	2:34:26	
62	Michael Lekhelsi (LES)	2:52:01	
63	Said Toumane (COM)	3:03:10	
DID NOT FINISH (DNF)
—	Ahmet Altun (TUR)	DNF	
—	Santiago de la Parte (ESP)	DNF	
—	Mike Gratton (GBR)	DNF	
—	Gerhard Hartmann (AUT)	DNF	
—	Yair Karni (ISR)	DNF	
—	Koshiro Kawaguchi (JPN)	DNF	
—	Louis Kenny (IRL)	DNF	
—	Ramón López (PAR)	DNF	
—	Alfredo Maravilla (ARG)	DNF	
—	Ed Mendoza (USA)	DNF	
—	Giampaolo Messina (ITA)	DNF	
—	Dereje Nedi (ETH)	DNF	
—	Peter Quance (CAN)	DNF	
—	Ahmed Salah (DJI)	DNF	
—	Carlos Victorino (MEX)	DNF	
—	Grenville Wood (AUS)	DNF	
—	Antonio Villanueva (MEX)	DNF	
—	Ralf Salzmann (FRG)	DNF	

== See also ==
- 1983 Marathon Year Ranking
- Men's Olympic Marathon (1984)
