= Marathon at the Summer Olympics =

Marathon at the Olympic Games
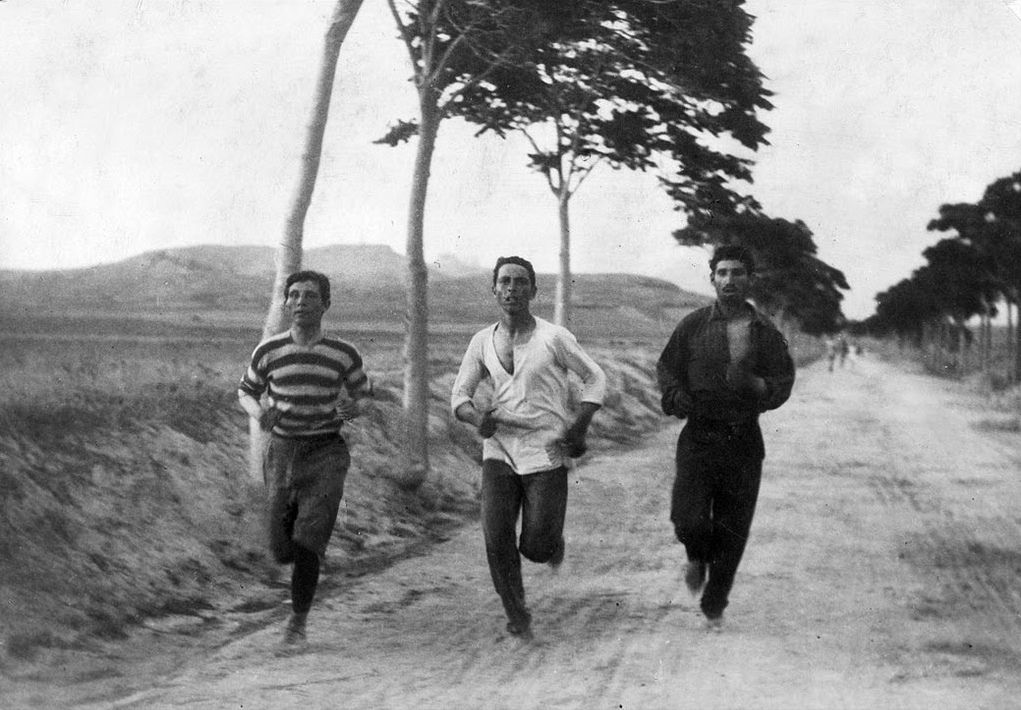
- Burton Holmes' photograph entitled 1896: Three athletes in training for the marathon at the Olympic Games in Athens

Overview
- Sport: Athletics
- Gender: Men and women
- Years held: Men: 1896–2024; Women: 1984–2024

Olympic record
- Men: 2:06:26 Tamirat Tola (2024)
- Women: 2:22:55 Sifan Hassan (2024)

Reigning champion
- Men: Tamirat Tola (ETH)
- Women: Sifan Hassan (NED)

The marathon at the Summer Olympics is the only road running event held at the multi-sport event. The men's marathon has been present on the Olympic athletics programme since the first modern Olympics in 1896. Nearly ninety years later, the women's event was added to the programme at the 1984 Olympics in Los Angeles.

== History ==
The modern marathon event was created and later refined through the Olympic competition. The idea of holding a marathon race at the first Olympics was suggested to Pierre de Coubertin by Michel Bréal. Based upon a popular myth stemming from the Battle of Marathon, in which Pheidippides ran to Athens from the town of Marathon, Greece to carry the message of a Greek victory, the 1896 course began in the town of Marathon and finished in Athens' Panathenaic Stadium – a distance of around 40 kilometres (25 mi). On April 10, 1896, Greek water-carrier Spyridon Louis won the first Olympic marathon in 2 hours 58 minutes and 50 seconds. The route between Marathon and Panathenaic Stadium was repeated when Athens hosted the 2004 Games.

The race distance varied from 40 to 42 kilometres (25 to 26 mi) in the early editions as it was typically based upon the distance between two points that the organisers felt were suitable. The 1908 London Olympics marked the introduction of the standard distance of 26 miles, 385 yards (42.195 km). However, it was not until the 1924 Paris Olympics that this distance became the standard at the Olympics.

The Olympic marathon proved immediately popular in the Western world and quickly spawned numerous long-running annual races, including the Boston Marathon in 1897, the Tour de Paris Marathon in 1902, the Yonkers Marathon in 1907, and the London Polytechnic Marathon in 1909. Such marathons played a key role in the expansion of the road running movement internationally over the course of the 20th century.

Until the 2016 Summer Olympics, it was tradition for the men's marathon to be held on the last day of the Games. However, due to changes to the Olympic program in 2020 and 2024, the women's marathon was held on the last day. The first time the marathon finish line took place inside the Olympic Stadium was at the 1908 Summer Olympics. This is something that has only been changed on a handful of occasions, the first time being at the 1936 Summer Olympics, when the event took place on a racing circuit. At the 1960 Summer Olympics, held in Rome, the finish line was at the Arch of Constantine; at the 2012 Summer Olympics, the marathon route started and finished on The Mall; in 2016, the start and finish were in the Sambadrome Marquês de Sapucaí; at the 2020 Summer Olympics, which were delayed to 2021 due to the COVID-19 pandemic, the marathon did not take place in the host city of Tokyo due to extreme weather conditions; in 2024, the route finished at the Esplanade des Invalides.

The Olympic records for the event are 2:06:26 hours for men, set by Tamirat Tola in 2024, and 2:22:55 hours for women, set by Sifan Hassan in 2024. The men's marathon world record has been improved several times at the Olympics: in 1908, 1920, and then at successive Olympics by Abebe Bikila in 1960 and 1964. Abebe Bikila, Waldemar Cierpinski, and Eliud Kipchoge are the only athletes to have won two Olympic gold medals in the marathon. No athlete has won more than two medals of any colour. Ethiopia have won the most gold medals in the event, with six, while Kenya has the greatest medal total with fifteen overall.

== Medal summary ==
=== Men ===
Games	Gold		Silver		Bronze	
1896 Athens	Spyridon Louis; Greece	2:58:50	Charilaos Vasilakos; Greece	3:06:03	Gyula Kellner; Hungary	3:06:35
1900 Paris	Michel Théato; France	2:59:45	Émile Champion; France	3:04:17	Ernst Fast; Sweden	3:37:14
1904 St. Louis	Thomas Hicks; United States	3:28:53	Albert Corey; United States	3:34:52	Arthur Newton; United States	3:47:33
1908 London	Johnny Hayes; United States	2:55:18.4	Charles Hefferon; South Africa	2:56:06.0	Joseph Forshaw; United States	2:57:10.4
1912 Stockholm	Ken McArthur; South Africa	2:36:54.8	Christian Gitsham; South Africa	2:37:52.0	Gaston Strobino; United States	2:38:42.4
1920 Antwerp	Hannes Kolehmainen; Finland	2:32:35.8	Jüri Lossmann; Estonia	2:32:48.6	Valerio Arri; Italy	2:36:32.8
1924 Paris	Albin Stenroos; Finland	2:41:22.6	Romeo Bertini; Italy	2:47:19.6	Clarence DeMar; United States	2:48:14.0
1928 Amsterdam	Boughera El Ouafi; France	2:32:57	Manuel Plaza; Chile	2:33:23	Martti Marttelin; Finland	2:35:02
1932 Los Angeles	Juan Carlos Zabala; Argentina	2:31:36	Sam Ferris; Great Britain	2:31:55	Armas Toivonen; Finland	2:32:12
1936 Berlin	Sohn Kee-chung; Japan	2:29:19.2	Ernest Harper; Great Britain	2:31:23.2	Nam Sung-yong; Japan	2:31:42.0
1948 London	Delfo Cabrera; Argentina	2:34:51.6	Tom Richards; Great Britain	2:35:07.6	Étienne Gailly; Belgium	2:35:33.6
1952 Helsinki	Emil Zátopek; Czechoslovakia	2:23:03.2	Reinaldo Gorno; Argentina	2:25:35.0	Gustaf Jansson; Sweden	2:26:07.0
1956 Melbourne	Alain Mimoun; France	2:25:00	Franjo Mihalić; Yugoslavia	2:26:32	Veikko Karvonen; Finland	2:27:47
1960 Rome	Abebe Bikila; Ethiopia	2:15:16.2	Rhadi Ben Abdesselam; Morocco	2:15:41.6	Barry Magee; New Zealand	2:17:18.2
1964 Tokyo	Abebe Bikila; Ethiopia	2:12:11.2	Basil Heatley; Great Britain	2:16:19.2	Kōkichi Tsuburaya; Japan	2:16:22.8
1968 Mexico City	Mamo Wolde; Ethiopia	2:20:26	Kenji Kimihara; Japan	2:23:31	Mike Ryan; New Zealand	2:23:45
1972 Munich	Frank Shorter; United States	2:12:19	Karel Lismont; Belgium	2:14:31	Mamo Wolde; Ethiopia	2:15:08
1976 Montreal	Waldemar Cierpinski; East Germany	2:09:55	Frank Shorter; United States	2:10:45	Karel Lismont; Belgium	2:11:12
1980 Moscow	Waldemar Cierpinski; East Germany	2:11:03	Gerard Nijboer; Netherlands	2:11:20	Satymkul Dzhumanazarov; Soviet Union	2:11:35
1984 Los Angeles	Carlos Lopes; Portugal	2:09:21	John Treacy; Ireland	2:09:56	Charlie Spedding; Great Britain	2:09:58
1988 Seoul	Gelindo Bordin; Italy	2:10:32	Douglas Wakiihuri; Kenya	2:10:47	Ahmed Salah; Djibouti	2:10:59
1992 Barcelona	Hwang Young-cho; South Korea	2:13:23	Kōichi Morishita; Japan	2:13:45	Stephan Freigang; Germany	2:14:00
1996 Atlanta	Josia Thugwane; South Africa	2:12:36	Lee Bong-ju; South Korea	2:12:39	Erick Wainaina; Kenya	2:12:44
2000 Sydney	Gezahegne Abera; Ethiopia	2:10:11	Erick Wainaina; Kenya	2:10:31	Tesfaye Tola; Ethiopia	2:11:10
2004 Athens	Stefano Baldini; Italy	2:10:55	Meb Keflezighi; United States	2:11:29	Vanderlei de Lima; Brazil	2:12:11
2008 Beijing	Samuel Wanjiru; Kenya	2:06:32	Jaouad Gharib; Morocco	2:07:16	Tsegay Kebede; Ethiopia	2:10:00
2012 London	Stephen Kiprotich; Uganda	2:08:01	Abel Kirui; Kenya	2:08:27	Wilson Kipsang Kiprotich; Kenya	2:09:37
2016 Rio de Janeiro	Eliud Kipchoge; Kenya	2:08:44	Feyisa Lelisa; Ethiopia	2:09:54	Galen Rupp; United States	2:10:05
2020 Tokyo	Eliud Kipchoge; Kenya	2:08:38	Abdi Nageeye; Netherlands	2:09:58	Bashir Abdi; Belgium	2:10:00
2024 Paris	Tamirat Tola; Ethiopia	2:06:26	Bashir Abdi; Belgium	2:06:47	Benson Kipruto; Kenya	2:07:00
2028 Los Angeles						

==== Multiple medalists ====
Rank	Athlete	Nation	Olympics	Gold	Silver	Bronze	Total
1=	Abebe Bikila	Ethiopia	1960–1964	2	0	0	2
1=	Waldemar Cierpinski	East Germany	1976–1980	2	0	0	2
1=	Eliud Kipchoge	Kenya	2016–2020	2	0	0	2
4	Frank Shorter	United States	1972–1976	1	1	0	2
5	Mamo Wolde	Ethiopia	1968–1972	1	0	1	2
6=	Karel Lismont	Belgium	1972–1976	0	1	1	2
6=	Erick Wainaina	Kenya	1996–2000	0	1	1	2
6=	Bashir Abdi	Belgium	2020–2024	0	1	1	2

==== Medals by country ====
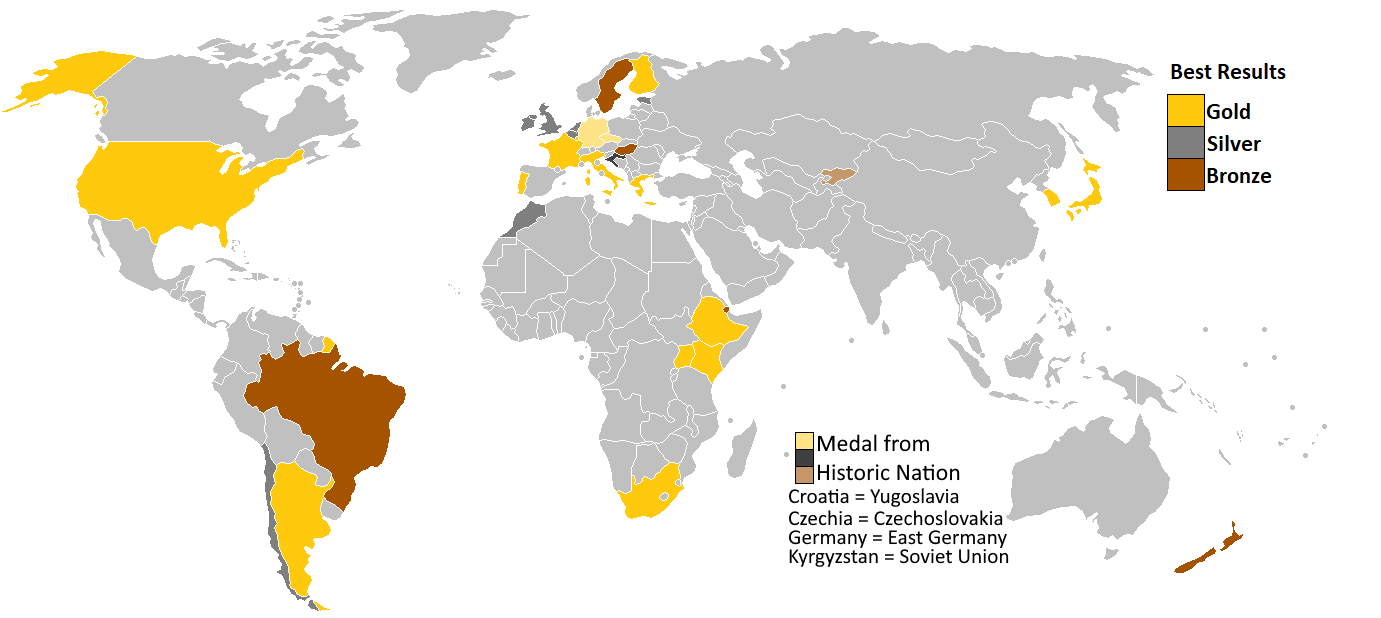
Map of countries' best results – Men's Marathon

As of the 2020 Olympics

Rank	Nation	Gold	Silver	Bronze	Total
1	Ethiopia	5	1	3	9
2	Kenya	3	3	2	8
3	United States	3	2	5	10
4	France	3	2	0	5
5	South Africa	2	2	0	4
6	Italy	2	1	1	4
7	Argentina	2	1	0	3
8	Finland	2	0	3	5
9	East Germany	2	0	0	2
10	Japan	1	2	2	5
11	Greece	1	1	0	2
11	South Korea	1	1	0	2
13	Czechoslovakia	1	0	0	1
13	Portugal	1	0	0	1
13	Uganda	1	0	0	1
16	Great Britain	0	4	1	5
17	Morocco	0	2	0	2
17	Netherlands	0	2	0	2
19	Belgium	0	1	3	4
20	Chile	0	1	0	1
20	Estonia	0	1	0	1
20	Ireland	0	1	0	1
20	Yugoslavia	0	1	0	1
24	New Zealand	0	0	2	2
24	Sweden	0	0	2	2
26	Brazil	0	0	1	1
26	Djibouti	0	0	1	1
26	Germany	0	0	1	1
26	Hungary	0	0	1	1
26	Soviet Union	0	0	1	1
Totals (30 entries)		30	29	29	88

=== Women ===
Games	Gold		Silver		Bronze	
1984 Los Angeles	Joan Benoit; United States	2:24:52	Grete Waitz; Norway	2:26:18	Rosa Mota; Portugal	2:26:57
1988 Seoul	Rosa Mota; Portugal	2:25:40	Lisa Martin; Australia	2:25:53	Katrin Dörre; East Germany	2:26:21
1992 Barcelona	Valentina Yegorova; Unified Team	2:32:41	Yuko Arimori; Japan	2:32:49	Lorraine Moller; New Zealand	2:33:59
1996 Atlanta	Fatuma Roba; Ethiopia	2:26:05	Valentina Yegorova; Russia	2:28:05	Yuko Arimori; Japan	2:28:39
2000 Sydney	Naoko Takahashi; Japan	2:23:14	Lidia Șimon; Romania	2:23:22	Joyce Chepchumba; Kenya	2:24:45
2004 Athens	Mizuki Noguchi; Japan	2:26:20	Catherine Ndereba; Kenya	2:26:32	Deena Kastor; United States	2:27:20
2008 Beijing	Constantina Tomescu; Romania	2:26:44	Catherine Ndereba; Kenya	2:27:06	Zhou Chunxiu; China	2:27:07
2012 London	Tiki Gelana; Ethiopia	2:23:07	Priscah Jeptoo; Kenya	2:23:12	Tatyana Petrova Arkhipova; Russia	2:23:29
2016 Rio de Janeiro	Jemima Sumgong; Kenya	2:24:04	Eunice Kirwa; Bahrain	2:24:13	Mare Dibaba; Ethiopia	2:24:30
2020 Tokyo	Peres Jepchirchir; Kenya	2:27:20	Brigid Kosgei; Kenya	2:27:36	Molly Seidel; United States	2:27:46
2024 Paris	Sifan Hassan; Netherlands	2:22:55	Tigst Assefa; Ethiopia	2:22:58	Hellen Obiri; Kenya	2:23:10

==== Multiple medalists ====
Rank	Athlete	Nation	Olympics	Gold	Silver	Bronze	Total
1	Valentina Yegorova	Unified Team; Russia	1992–1996	1	1	0	2
2	Rosa Mota	Portugal	1984–1988	1	0	1	2
3	Catherine Ndereba	Kenya	2004–2008	0	2	0	2
4	Yuko Arimori	Japan	1992–1996	0	1	1	2

==== Medals by country ====
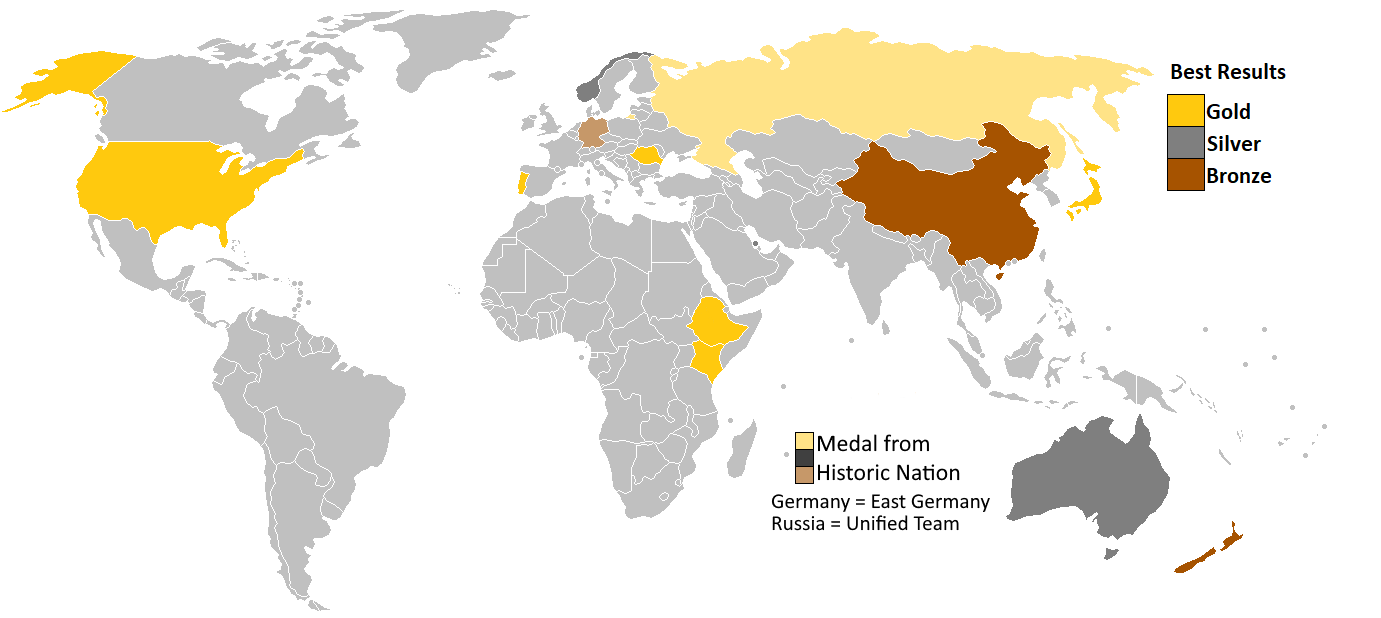
Map of countries' best results – Women's Marathon

As of the 2020 Olympics

Rank	Nation	Gold	Silver	Bronze	Total
1	Kenya	2	4	1	7
2	Japan	2	1	1	4
3	Ethiopia	2	0	1	3
4	Romania	1	1	0	2
5	United States	1	0	2	3
6	Portugal	1	0	1	2
7	Unified Team	1	0	0	1
8	Russia	0	1	1	2
9	Australia	0	1	0	1
9	Bahrain	0	1	0	1
9	Norway	0	1	0	1
12	China	0	0	1	1
12	East Germany	0	0	1	1
12	New Zealand	0	0	1	1
Totals (14 entries)		10	10	10	30

== Intercalated Games ==
The 1906 Intercalated Games were held in Athens and at the time were officially recognised as part of the Olympic Games series, with the intention being to hold a games in Greece in two-year intervals between the internationally held Olympics. However, this plan never came to fruition and the International Olympic Committee (IOC) later decided not to recognise these games as part of the official Olympic series. Some sports historians continue to treat the results of these games as part of the Olympic canon.

At this event a men's marathon was held over 41.86 km and Canada's Billy Sherring won the competition. John Svanberg, the runner-up in the 1906 5-mile race, was also runner-up in the marathon. American William Frank was the bronze medalist.

Games	Gold	Silver	Bronze
1906 Athens	Billy Sherring (CAN)	John Svanberg (SWE)	William Frank (USA)
