= 1983 London Marathon =

3rd London Marathon

3rd London Marathon
- Venue: London, United Kingdom
- Date: 17 April 1983

Champions
- Men: Mike Gratton (2:09:43)
- Women: Grete Waitz (2:25:29)
- Wheelchair men: Gordon Perry (3:20:07)
- Wheelchair women: Denise Smith (4:29:03)

The 1983 London Marathon was the third running of the annual marathon race in London, United Kingdom, which took place on Sunday, 17 April. The elite men's race was won by home athlete Mike Gratton in a time of 2:09:43 hours and the women's race was won by Norway's Grete Waitz in 2:25:29. Waitz's time was a marathon world record, yet it stood for only one day as it was beaten by Joan Benoit at the 1983 Boston Marathon.

Around 60,000 people applied to enter the race, of which 19,735 had their applications accepted and around 16,500 started the race. A total of 15,793 runners finished the race.

A wheelchair race was held for the first time, organised by the British Sports Association for the Disabled, and British athletes Gordon Perry and Denise Smith won the men's and women's divisions, respectively. The race organiser Chris Brasher had opposed the inclusion of wheelchair racers, emphasising that it should remain a running competition and that the inclusion of wheeled racers would lead to accidents and "more disability". The Greater London Council, under the leadership of Ken Livingstone and Illtyd Harrington, threatened to withdraw funding for the event, forcing the organisers to relent and include wheelchair athletes.

== Results ==
=== Men ===
Position	Athlete	Nationality	Time
1st place, gold medalist(s)	Mike Gratton	United Kingdom	2:09:43
2nd place, silver medalist(s)	Gerard Helme	United Kingdom	2:10:12
3rd place, bronze medalist(s)	Henrik Jørgensen	Denmark	2:10:47
4	Kebede Balcha	Ethiopia	2:11:32
5	James Dingwall	United Kingdom	2:11:44
6	Ricardo Ortega	Spain	2:11:51
7	Martin McCarthy	United Kingdom	2:11:54
8	Emiel Puttemans	Belgium	2:12:27
9	Trevor Wright	New Zealand	2:12:29
10	Øyvind Dahl	Norway	2:12:43
11	David Cannon	United Kingdom	2:12:51
12	Fred Vandervennet	Belgium	2:13:01
13	Raymond Crabb	United Kingdom	2:13:15
14	Dennis Fowles	United Kingdom	2:13:21
15	Jan Fjærestad	Norway	2:13:31
16	Marc De Blander	Belgium	2:13:43
17	John Caine	United Kingdom	2:13:43
18	Mervyn Brameld	United Kingdom	2:13:48
19	Eirik Berge	Norway	2:13:50
20	Bernard Bobes	France	2:14:00
21	Gyorgy Sinko	Hungary	2:14:11

=== Women ===
Position	Athlete	Nationality	Time
1st place, gold medalist(s)	Grete Waitz	Norway	2:25:29
2nd place, silver medalist(s)	Mary O'Connor	New Zealand	2:28:20
3rd place, bronze medalist(s)	Glynis Penny	United Kingdom	2:36:21
4	Karolina Szabó	Hungary	2:36:22
5	Jillian Colwell	Australia	2:37:12
6	Antonia Ladanyi	Hungary	2:37:42
7	Deirdre Nagle	Ireland	2:37:42
8	Kathryn Binns	United Kingdom	2:38:11
9	Sarah Rowell	United Kingdom	2:39:11
10	Priscilla Welch	United Kingdom	2:39:29
11	Jacquie Turney	Australia	2:40:05
12	Sally Ann Hales	United Kingdom	2:40:08
13	Heidi Jacobsen	Norway	2:40:11
14	Zehava Shmueli	Israel	2:40:29
15	Julie Asgill	United Kingdom	2:40:59
16	Dorothy Browne	Australia	2:41:24
17	Mette Holm	Denmark	2:41:35
18	Kersti Jakobsen	Denmark	2:41:53
19	Margaret Lockley	United Kingdom	2:42:08
20	Karen Whapshott	United Kingdom	2:42:13

=== Wheelchair men ===
Position	Athlete	Nationality	Time
1st place, gold medalist(s)	Gordon Perry	United Kingdom	3:20:07
2nd place, silver medalist(s)	Joe Fletcher	United Kingdom	3:25:03
3rd place, bronze medalist(s)	Tim Marshall	United Kingdom	3:26:15
4	Leroy Dobson	United Kingdom	3:27:40
5	Charles Raymond	United Kingdom	3:52:55
6	Ertie Gomec	Turkey	3:55:50
7	James Gilham	United Kingdom	3:56:57
8	Shahriar Esfandiari	Iran	4:08:16
9	Stuart Anderson	United Kingdom	4:29:03
10	Graham Young	United Kingdom	4:35:11

=== Wheelchair women ===
Position	Athlete	Nationality	Time
1st place, gold medalist(s)	Denise Smith	United Kingdom	4:29:03
2nd place, silver medalist(s)	Joanne Roberts	United Kingdom	6:09:03
