= Gerard Helme =

British marathon runner

Gerry Helme
Personal information
- Nationality: British
- Born: 28 March 1957 (age 69)
- Height: 5 ft 11 in (1.80 m)
- Weight: 153 lb (69 kg)

Sport
- Sport: Long-distance running
- Event: Marathon
- Coached by: Ted Forshaw

Achievements and titles
- Personal best(s): 10,000m: 28:13.4; Half-marathon: 1:04:27; Marathon: 2:10:12
Medal record
Men's athletics
Representing United Kingdom
World Marathon Majors
Silver medal – second place	1983 London	Marathon
UK Athletics Championships
Bronze medal – third place	1983 UK Championship	10,000m

Gerard Helme (born 28 March 1957, also known as Gerry Helme) is a runner from Britain and Northern Ireland who was a top long-distance runner in the 1980s. He was part of the British team of three (along with Hugh Jones and Mike Gratton) that completed at the 1983 Men’s Marathon World Championship race.

== Early career ==
Helme went to Range High School and clocked a fast time in the Liverpool Corporate Cup. Later, he studied at Liverpool College in Lancaster, England. In the late ‘70s and early ‘80s, as most running was concentrated in club teams, Helme was a part of the Ron Hill Race Team that ran cross country and road races around the United Kingdom.

== Professional career ==
In 1981, Helme won of the Freckleton Half Marathon and the Birmingham Marathon. The following year, after ankle surgery, he won several more road races, including the St. Petersburg Marathon in Florida and second place in the Orlando Marathon. At the London Marathon in 1983, as the broadcasters covered the event on live TV, good weather and fast times moved the mass of 18,000 runners through the city streets. Helme, who had decided to run the race two days earlier, dueled with Henrik Jørgensen of Denmark and fellow English runner Mike Gratton. Gratton took the lead in the end, and Helme finished second in 2:10:12, thirty seconds back. In the woman’s race that day, Grete Waitz ran a blistering pace in the woman’s race to tie the world record.

The following month, he was on the track in Edinburgh, Scotland, for the 1983 UK Athletics Championships in the 10,000 meters. He ran a 28:13.04 to finish third behind winner Steve Binns.

Still in great form, he traveled to the northeast shore of Lake Superior to run a point-to-point race called Grandma's Marathon (named after a restaurant). He started in Two Harbors, Minnesota with 7,000 other runners and out paced them all to cross the finish line in Duluth, Minnesota in 2:12:09 for the win. His coaches had discouraged him from attending the race, as he was scheduled to run the World Championship marathon in August.

The 1983 Men’s Marathon World Championship race in Helsinki, Finland, did not go in his favor. As Rob deCastella ran to victory in 2:10:03, Helme fell back to 48th place.

The following year, he focused on a shorter distance and entered the famous 11-kilometer cross-country race in Italy, the Cross di Alà dei Sardi. Over the grass and hills, he outran top runners such as Claudio Solone and Adriano Pezzoli to take home the first-place finish.

By 1989, he was a major contender at large road races. He entered the Rome Marathon, and many favored him to win. But Italian Giuseppe Gerbi got ahead on the cobblestone streets and took the win. Helme, in his pink singlet, finished second.

== Personal life ==
Helme later worked as a runner’s agent.
