= Antwerp Marathon =

Road running event in Antwerp, Belgium

- Date: April (since 2007)
- Location: Antwerp
- Event type: Road
- Distance: Marathon, 10 miles, (1&5km)
- Primary sponsor: AG Insurance
- Established: 1980
- Course records: Men's: 2:11:15 (2011) (Kenya) Elijah Kemboi; Women's: 2:31:26 (1995) (Belgium) Marleen Renders
- Website: Antwerp Marathon
- Participants: 2,682 (2019)

The Antwerp Marathon is an annual AIMS-certified marathon hosted by Antwerp, Belgium, organised since 1980 and held in April (since 2007; before then in different months). At this event, the more popular Antwerp 10 Miles is organised after the marathon itself.

== Track ==
The start of the 42.195 km is at the Left River Bank (Linkeroever) of Antwerp. After a loop of 8 km the track goes via the Waaslandtunnel (1770 meter), under the Scheldt to the North of Antwerp. Past the antique area, the old law court, the Binnensingel, park Rivierenhof, Antwerp International Airport and the Scheldt the finish is located at the Grote Markt.

== Distances ==
Apart from the marathon and the 10 miles race, also runs over five and one km are held at this event.

== Size ==
Far more people participate in the Antwerp 10 Miles than in the marathon itself. In 2014, the 10 Miles counted 25,998 participants and the marathon 1989 runners.

== Past winners ==
| Year | Winner (men) | Country | Time | Winner (women) | Country | Time |
|---|---|---|---|---|---|---|
| 11 October 1980 | Julien Grimon | Belgium | 2:22:05 | Unknown | | |
| 13 June 1981 | Jon Anderson | United States | 2:17:32 | Doretta Janssens | Belgium | 3:00:52 |
| 5 June 1982 | Armand Parmentier | Belgium | 2:19:13 | Denise Alfvoet | Belgium | 2:56:21 |
| 10 September 1983 | Kjell-Erik Ståhl | Sweden | 2:13:48 | Magda Ilands | Belgium | 2:37:51 |
| 23 June 1984 | Cor Saelmans | Belgium | 2:15:57 | Rebecca Price | United States | 2:56:50 |
| 22 June 1985 | Danny Pauwelijn | Belgium | 2:24:10 | Rose-Marie Cools | Belgium | 3:27:14 |
| 11 October 1986 | Francois Blommaerts | Belgium | 2:17:48 | Unknown | | |
| 27 June 1987 | Peter van der Elst | Belgium | 2:21:29 | Nadine Mawett | Belgium | 3:34:08 |
| 25 June 1988 | Unknown | | | Unknown | | |
| 1989–1993 | Not held | | | | | |
| 10 April 1994 | Eddy Hellebuyck | Belgium | 2:11:50 | Marie-Christine Christiaen | Belgium | 2:40:54 |
| 9 April 1995 | Oleg Otmakhov | Russia | 2:12:43 | Marleen Renders | Belgium | 2:31:26 |
| 14 April 1996 | Oleg Otmakhov | Russia | 2:14:41 | Kaoru Tsunekawa | Japan | 2:45:58 |
| 13 April 1997 | Oleg Otmakhov | Russia | 2:15:40 | Flora Venegas | Chile | 2:40:15 |
| 19 April 1998 | Ronny Ligneel | Belgium | 2:15:22 | Lyudmila Afonjuschkina | Russia | 2:38:19 |
| 18 April 1999 | Oleg Otmakhov | Russia | 2:13:44 | Lieve Slegers | Belgium | 2:34:23 |
| 24 September 2000 | Eric Gerome | Belgium | 2:20:04 | Marleen van Reusel | Belgium | 2:58:08 |
| 23 September 2001 | Eric Gerome | Belgium | 2:14:23 | Celine Steenhuyzen | Belgium | 3:08:58 |
| 22 September 2002 | Eric Gerome | Belgium | 2:19:45 | Christiane Gloesener | Belgium | 3:11:43 |
| 2003–2006 | Not held | | | | | |
| 22 April 2007 | Wilson Kibet | Kenya | 2:16:37 | Anja Smolders | Belgium | 2:41:20 |
| 20 April 2008 | Elias Chebet | Kenya | 2:17:54 | Anja Smolders | Belgium | 2:43:15 |
| 26 April 2009 | Daniel Koech | Kenya | 2:15:20 | Louise Deldicque | Belgium | 2:53:30 |
| 25 April 2010 | Nahashon Kimaiyo | Kenya | 2:12:00 | Anne-Marie Dupont | Belgium | 3:03:34 |
| 17 April 2011 | Elijah Kemboi | Kenya | 2:11:15 | Anne-Marie Dupont | Belgium | 3:08:06 |
| 22 April 2012 | Paul Kiprop | Kenya | 2:15:38 | Anje Damen | Belgium | 3:01:59 |
| 21 April 2013 | Abdelhadi El Hachimi | Belgium | 2:12:53 | Louise Deldicque | Belgium | 2:52:36 |
| 27 April 2014 | Moses Mwarur | Kenya | 2:15:26 | Trui Depondt | Belgium | 2:54:36 |
| 26 April 2015 | Florent Caelen | Belgium | 2:16:08 | Mieke Dupont | Belgium | 2:58:40 |
| 17 April 2016 | Felix Kirwa | Kenya | 2:15:57 | Hazel Behagg | United Kingdom | 2:55:59 |
| 23 April 2017 | David Cherop | Uganda | 2:17:13 | Mieke Dupont | Belgium | 2:54:16 |
| 22 April 2018 | Ezekiel Kiprop | Kenya | 2:15:53 | Ann Sofie Claeys | Belgium | 2:56:06 |
| 28 April 2019 | Willem Van Schuerbeeck | Belgium | 2:21:40 | Astrid Verhoeven | Belgium | 2:41:19 |
| 2020 | Not held (COVID-19) | | | | | |
| 11 September 2021 | Filip Vercruysse | Belgium | 2:24:11 | Victoria Warpy | Belgium | 3:02:00 |
| 11 September 2022 | Julien Calandreau | Belgium | 2:29:12 | Ada Geuze | Netherlands | 3:06:24 |
| 22 October 2023 | Vincent Rono | Kenya | 2:13:06 | Joke Odeyn | Belgium | 2:54:34 |

== See also ==
- List of marathon races in Europe
