= Robert de Castella =

Australian long-distance runner

Robert de Castella AO, MBE
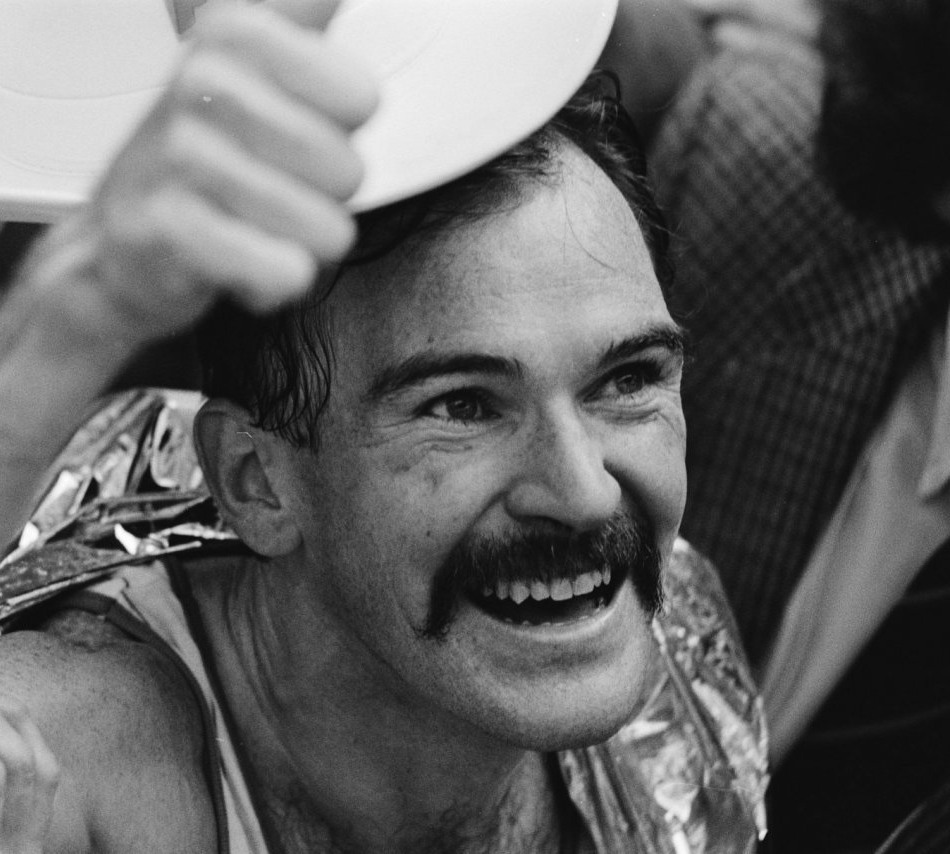
- De Castella in 1983

Personal information
- Full name: Francois Robert de Castella
- Born: 27 February 1957 (age 69) Melbourne, Victoria, Australia
- Height: 1.80 m (5 ft 11 in)
- Weight: 65 kg (143 lb)

Sport
- Country: Australia
- Sport: Long-distance running
- Club: Old Xaverians, Glenhuntly Athletics Club, Melbourne; Mazda Optimists Track Club
Medal record
World Championships
Gold medal – first place	1983 Helsinki	Marathon
Commonwealth Games
Gold medal – first place	1982 Brisbane	Marathon
Gold medal – first place	1986 Edinburgh	Marathon

Francois Robert de Castella (born 27 February 1957) is an Australian former world champion marathon runner.

De Castella is widely known as "Deek" or "Deeks" to the Australian public, and "Tree" to his competitors due to his thick legs and inner calm. He ran in four consecutive Olympic marathons, from 1980 to 1992, finishing in the top ten in three of them. He ran a personal best of 2:07:51 in 1986.

== Early life ==
De Castella is of French and Swiss-French descent. His family were part of both the French nobility and Swiss nobility. He was born in Melbourne, Victoria, the eldest of seven children. Sport was a way of life in his family – his father Rolet ran marathons in the 1950s. His mother Anne was a state-level tennis player. His brother Nicholas, took part in four World Cross Country Championships, whereas brother Anthony competed in running at club level for more than 25 years. Rob de Castella attended Xavier College in Melbourne where he was an outstanding track athlete and trained under Pat Clohessy from the age of 11.

== Marathon career ==
De Castella wanted to represent Australia at the Olympics in Moscow and reckoned his best chance was in the marathon. He won the Australian championship and finished second in the Australian Olympic trials to gain a place on the 1980 Olympic team.

=== 1980 Olympic Games Moscow ===
At his first big international marathon competition, DeCastella finished 10th in a time of 2:14:31, in a field of 74 runners. 21 competitors did not finish.

=== 1981 Fukuoka Marathon ===
De Castella first came to international attention when he won the 1981 Fukuoka Marathon in a time of 2:08:18, which was the fastest time recorded for an out-and-back course. It was not initially known to be a world best time, because his time was 5 seconds slower than the time set by Alberto Salazar in the 1981 New York City Marathon. It later emerged that the New York course was about 148 metres short. De Castella's time was later ratified as the world record.

=== 1982 Commonwealth Games Marathon ===
De Castella was the favourite to win the marathon at the 1982 Commonwealth Games in Brisbane. At the start of the race, Tanzanians Gidamis Shahanga and Juma Ikangaa raced to the lead and were 50 m ahead of the pack after five minutes. After the 20 km mark, this gap had widened to several hundred meters. At the halfway mark, De Castella developed diarrhoea. In 100% humidity, he let go of his bowels and signalled for some damp towels from his crew members. By the 23 km mark, Ikangaa had taken the lead from his compatriot, with de Castella in the main pack some 250 m behind but closing. De Castella passed the now-tiring Shahanga at the 38 km mark, and in the next kilometre drew level with Ikangaa and then took the lead. However, Ikangaa was not done yet, and he re-took the lead slightly. The duel continued for the remainder of the race. Eventually, de Castella pulled away and won by 80 metres in a time of 2:09:18, 12 seconds ahead of Ikangaa. Briton Mike Gratton finished third in 2:12:06, and Shahanga faded to finish 6th. The race finished on the streets of Brisbane, not in the main stadium.

=== 1983 Rotterdam Marathon ===
In April 1983, De Castella defeated a deep field to win the Rotterdam Marathon. The race was billed as a clash between de Castella and Salazar, who at the time was undefeated, and was also televised live back to Australia. De Castella dropped all of the field except Carlos Lopes (who would win the Olympic marathon the next year), and defeated Lopes in a sprint for the finish, winning in a time of 2:08:37. De Castella's time was, at that point, the fourth fastest in history.

=== 1983 IAAF World Championships ===
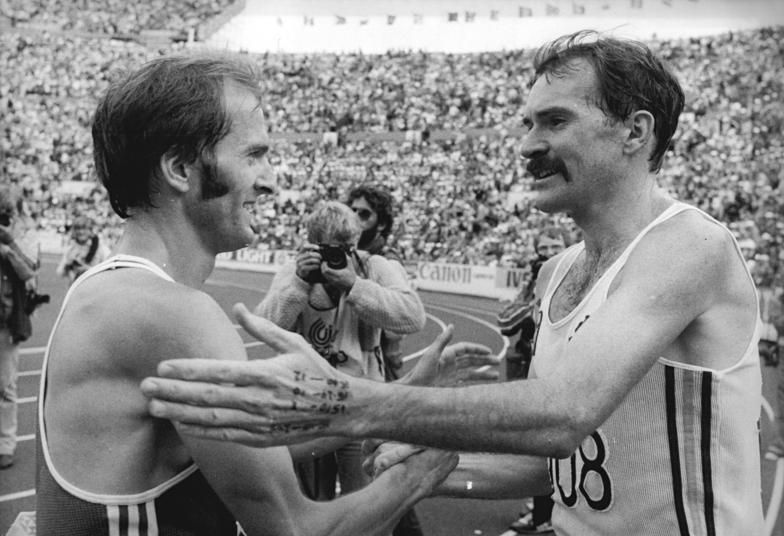
World champion Robert De Castella (r.) receives congratulations from 3rd-place finisher Waldemar Cierpinski (DDR) in Helsinki 1983

De Castella won Australia's first athletic World Championships gold medal when he won the marathon in August 1983, beating Ethiopian Kebede Balcha by 24 seconds and Olympic champion Waldemar Cierpinski by 34 seconds.

=== 1984 Olympic Games ===
De Castella was the favourite for the 1984 Summer Olympics marathon. He ran in a leading group of ten until about the 35 kilometres mark, when at a drink station, six leading runners picked up speed and de Castella could not keep up. He caught some of the leaders during the final kilometres, and finished fifth.

=== 1986 Commonwealth Games ===
De Castella defended his Commonwealth Games title in Edinburgh, winning in 2:10:15.

== Cross country running ==
In addition to marathon running, de Castella was also an accomplished cross country runner. He won the Australian national title once as a junior and four times as a senior, along with five other podium finishes. He competed eight times at the World Cross Country Championships from 1977 to 1986, finishing in the top 20 five times.

== Post career and life ==
De Castella failed to finish the marathon at the 1987 World Athletics Championships. He represented Australia at the 1988 Seoul and 1992 Barcelona Olympics, competing in four straight Olympic Games. He finished in the top ten in three Olympics, but never won a medal.

He retired from the sport in 1993 and lives in Canberra, together with his wife Theresa and four children. Previously he was married to the former champion triathlete Gaylene Clews. He lost his family home, along with many of his medals and other citations, in the 2003 Canberra bushfires. Choosing to move rather than rebuild, he now lives in a nearby suburb. He later helped with the taskforce established for the reconstruction of areas worst affected by the fires.

From 1990 to 1995, de Castella was the director of the Australian Institute of Sport and subsequently became executive director of Focus On You, a company focusing on corporate and community health and fitness. He has also been actively involved in other organisations dedicated to encouraging healthy living for both children and adults. He also fronts the Indigenous Marathon Project. In 2009, he founded the Stromlo Running Festival, an annual trail running event held at Stromlo Forest Park in Canberra. In 2014 he was made an Officer of the Order of Australia at the Australia Day honours.

In 2003, de Castella launched "deeks", a specialist chain of grain and gluten free bakeries & cafés. In 2004, he earned a black belt in the traditional Okinawan Goju Ryu; he has also been part of a long-running advertising campaign for the multi-vitamin tablet "Centrum".

On 10 October 2023, de Castella was one of 25 Australians of the Year who signed an open letter supporting the Yes vote in the Indigenous Voice referendum, initiated by psychiatrist Patrick McGorry.

== Results ==
- 1977 – won the Sydney City to Surf in 41' 12"
- 1979 – won the Victorian Championship in 2h 14'44" and the Australian marathon title in 2h 13'23"
- 1980 – 10th in the 1980 Summer Olympics marathon in Moscow, 2h 14'31"; 8th at the Fukuoka Marathon in 2h 10'44"
- 1981 – won the Fukuoka Marathon in 2h 08'18" (world record from 1981 to 1984)
- 1981 – won and set fastest time of 40'08" in City to Surf, Sydney. (this time bettered in 1991)
- 1982 – won the 1982 Commonwealth Games marathon in Brisbane in 2h 09'18"
- 1983 – won the Rotterdam Marathon in 2h 08'37"
- 1983 – won the 1983 World Championships in Athletics marathon in Helsinki in 2h 10'03"
- 1984 – 5th in the Olympic Marathon in Los Angeles in 2h 11'09"
- 1984 – 3rd in the Chicago Marathon in 2h 09'09"
- 1985 – 3rd in the Chicago Marathon in 2h 08'48"
- 1986 – won the 1986 Commonwealth Games marathon in Edinburgh in 2h 10'15"
- 1986 – won the Boston Marathon in 2h 07'51" (personal best)
- 1987 – won the Great North Run in 1h 02'04"
- 1988 – 4th in the Tokyo International Marathon in 2h 08'49"
- 1988 – 8th in the 1988 Summer Olympics marathon in Seoul in 2h 13'07"
- 1990 – 13th in the 1990 Commonwealth Games marathon in 2h 18'50"
- 1991 – won the Rotterdam Marathon in 2h 09'42"
- 1992 – finished 26th in Olympic Marathon, Barcelona in 2h 17'44"

== Records ==
As of May 2009, de Castella still held the following records:

- Australian U20 10,000 m – 28'54"4 on 16 December 1976 in Melbourne
- Australian 20 km Track – 58.37.2 on 17 April 1982 in Rome
- Australian 1 hr – 20,516 m on 17 April 1982 in Rome
- Australian All Comers Marathon – 2h 09'18" in Brisbane Commonwealth Games 1982
- Australian Marathon – 2h 07'51" at the 1986 Boston Marathon

== Other awards ==
- 1982 – Member of the Order of the British Empire in recognition of service to athletics.
- 1983 – Australian of the Year
- 1985 – Sport Australia Hall of Fame
- 2000 – Australian Sports Medal for significant contribution as a competitor (Athletics).
- 2001 – Centenary Medal service to the sport of athletics and to sports administration.
- 2001 – Australian Institute of Sport 'Best of the Best'
- 2014 – Officer of the Order of Australia for distinguished service to the community through programs promoting children's health and fitness, as a supporter and mentor of young Indigenous men and women, and to marathon running.

Records
Preceded by (Australia) Derek Clayton	Men's Marathon World Record Holder; 6 December 1981 – 21 October 1984	Succeeded by (United Kingdom) Steve Jones
