= Joseph Peter =

Swiss marathon runner

Personal information
- Nationality: Swiss
- Born: 23 September 1949 (age 76)

Sport
- Sport: Long-distance running
- Event: Marathon

Joseph Peter (born 23 September 1949) is a Swiss long-distance runner. He competed in the marathon at the 1980 Summer Olympics.
