= Dereje Nedi =

Ethiopian long-distance runner

Medal record

Men's athletics

Representing Ethiopia

African Championships
Gold medal – first place	1988 Annaba	Marathon
Bronze medal – third place	1985 Cairo	Marathon

Dereje Nedi (born October 10, 1955) is a retired male long-distance runner from Ethiopia. He represented his native country at the 1980 Summer Olympics in the men's marathon. He set his personal best (2:10:31) in the classic distance on August 18, 1984, winning the marathon race at the Friendship Games in Moscow.

== International competitions ==
Year	Competition	Venue	Position	Event	Notes
Representing Ethiopia
1978	All-Africa Games	Algiers, Algeria	2nd	Marathon	2:23:08
1980	Olympic Games	Moscow, Soviet Union	7th	Marathon	2:12:44
1981	Tokyo Marathon	Tokyo, Japan	3rd	Marathon	2:12:14
1983	World Championships	Helsinki, Finland	—	Marathon	DNF
1984	Frankfurt Marathon	Frankfurt, West Germany	1st	Marathon	2:11:18
1984	Friendship Games	Moscow, Soviet Union	1st	Marathon	2:10:32
1985	African Championships	Cairo, Egypt	3rd	Marathon	2:25:41
1987	All-Africa Games	Nairobi, Kenya	2nd	Marathon	2:15:27
1988	African Championships	Annaba, Algeria	1st	Marathon	2:27:51
