= Cor Vriend =

Dutch long-distance runner (born 1949)

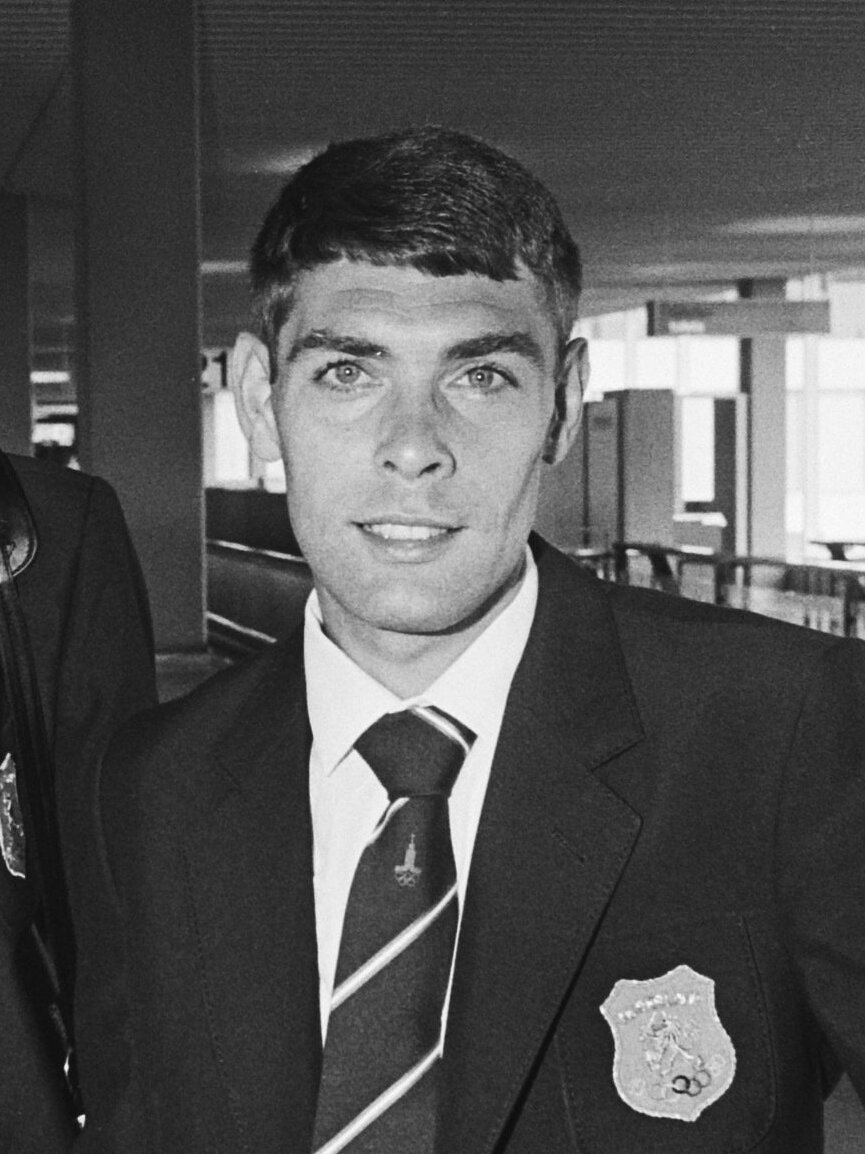
- Cor Vriend in 1980

Personal information
- Born: 8 November 1949 (age 77) Eindhoven, the Netherlands
- Height: 1.73 m (5 ft 8 in)
- Weight: 65 kg (143 lb)

Sport
- Sport: Athletics
- Club: HPAC, Helmond

Cornelis Wilhelmus Pieter "Cor" Vriend (born 8 November 1949) is a former long-distance runner from the Netherlands, who mainly competed in the marathon. He participated in two consecutive Summer Olympics for his native country; in 1980 (Moscow, 41st place) and 1984 (Los Angeles, 39th place). During the early 1980s he was overshadowed by his fellow countryman Gerard Nijboer.

Vriend twice won the Amsterdam Marathon, in 1983 and 1984. He also won the Enschede Marathon in 1981 and the Beppu-Ōita Marathon in Japan in 1984. He is the Dutch record holder for the relatively obscure 25,000 m and 30,000 m track events, both of which he set on 22 August 1981.

His personal best at the marathon was 2:11:41, set at the 1984 Maassluis Marathon, finishing first in the race.

== Achievements ==
Year	Competition	Venue	Position	Event	Notes
Representing the Netherlands
1980	Olympic Games	Moscow, Soviet Union	41st	Marathon	2:26:41
1981	Enschede Marathon	Enschede, Netherlands	1st	Marathon	2:15:54
1981	Fukuoka Marathon	Fukuoka, Japan	13th	Marathon	2:14:25
1982	Amsterdam Marathon	Amsterdam, Netherlands	1st	Marathon	2:12:15
1982	European Championships	Athens, Greece	—	Marathon	DNF
1983	Amsterdam Marathon	Amsterdam, Netherlands	1st	Marathon	2:13:41
1984	Olympic Games	Los Angeles, United States	39th	Marathon	2:21:08
1984	Beppu-Ōita Marathon	Beppu-Ōita, Japan	1st	Marathon	2:12:05
