= Leodigard Martin =

Tanzanian long-distance runner

Personal information
- Nationality: Tanzanian
- Born: 10 August 1960 (age 65)

Sport
- Sport: Long-distance running
- Event: Marathon

Leodigard Martin (born 8 October 1960) is a Tanzanian long-distance runner. He competed in the marathon at the 1980 Summer Olympics.
