= Leonid Moseyev =

Personal information
- Born: October 21, 1952 (age 73) Ozyorsk, Chelyabinsk Oblast, Soviet Union

Sport
- Sport: Marathon running
Medal record
Representing Soviet Union
European Championships
Gold medal – first place	1978 Prague	Marathon
Summer Universiade
Gold medal – first place	1977 Sofia	10,000m
Bronze medal – third place	1977 Sofia	5000m

Leonid Nikolaevich Moseyev (Russian: Леонид Николаевич Мосеев; born October 21, 1952) is a retired male long-distance runner from the Soviet Union.

Moseyev won the gold medal in the men's marathon at the 1978 European Championships in Prague.

He twice competed in the same event for the Soviet Union at the Summer Olympics in 1976 and 1980, finishing 7th and 5th respectively.

== Achievements ==
Year	Competition	Venue	Position	Event	Notes
Representing the Soviet Union
1976	Olympic Games	Montréal, Canada	7th	Marathon	2:13:33
1978	European Championships	Prague, Czechoslovakia	1st	Marathon	2:11:57.5
1980	Olympic Games	Moscow, Soviet Union	5th	Marathon	2:12:14
1982	European Championships	Athens, Greece	16th	Marathon	2:24:00
