= Moges Alemayehu =

Ethiopian long-distance runner

Personal information
- Nationality: Ethiopian
- Born: 6 December 1948 (age 77)

Sport
- Sport: Long-distance running
- Event: Marathon

Moges Alemayehu (born 6 December 1948) is an Ethiopian long-distance runner. He competed in the marathon at the 1980 Summer Olympics.
