= Josef Jánský =

Czech long-distance runner

Personal information
- Nationality: Czech
- Born: 24 November 1940 (age 85) Strakonice, Protectorate of Bohemia and Moravia

Sport
- Sport: Long-distance running
- Event: Marathon

Josef Jánský (born 24 November 1940) is a Czech long-distance runner. He competed in the 10,000 meters in the 1972 Summer Olympics, finishing in 9th place in the final, as well as the marathon at the 1980 Summer Olympics, which he did not finish.

Jánský qualified for Moscow Olympic marathon by running a time of 2:14:28 earlier on May 3, 1980 in Karl Marx City (East Germany). Two years earlier he also competed for his country in the 1978 European Athletics Championships – Men's marathon, finishing in 19th place with a time of 2:16:53.
