= Elijah Kemboi =

Kenyan long-distance runner

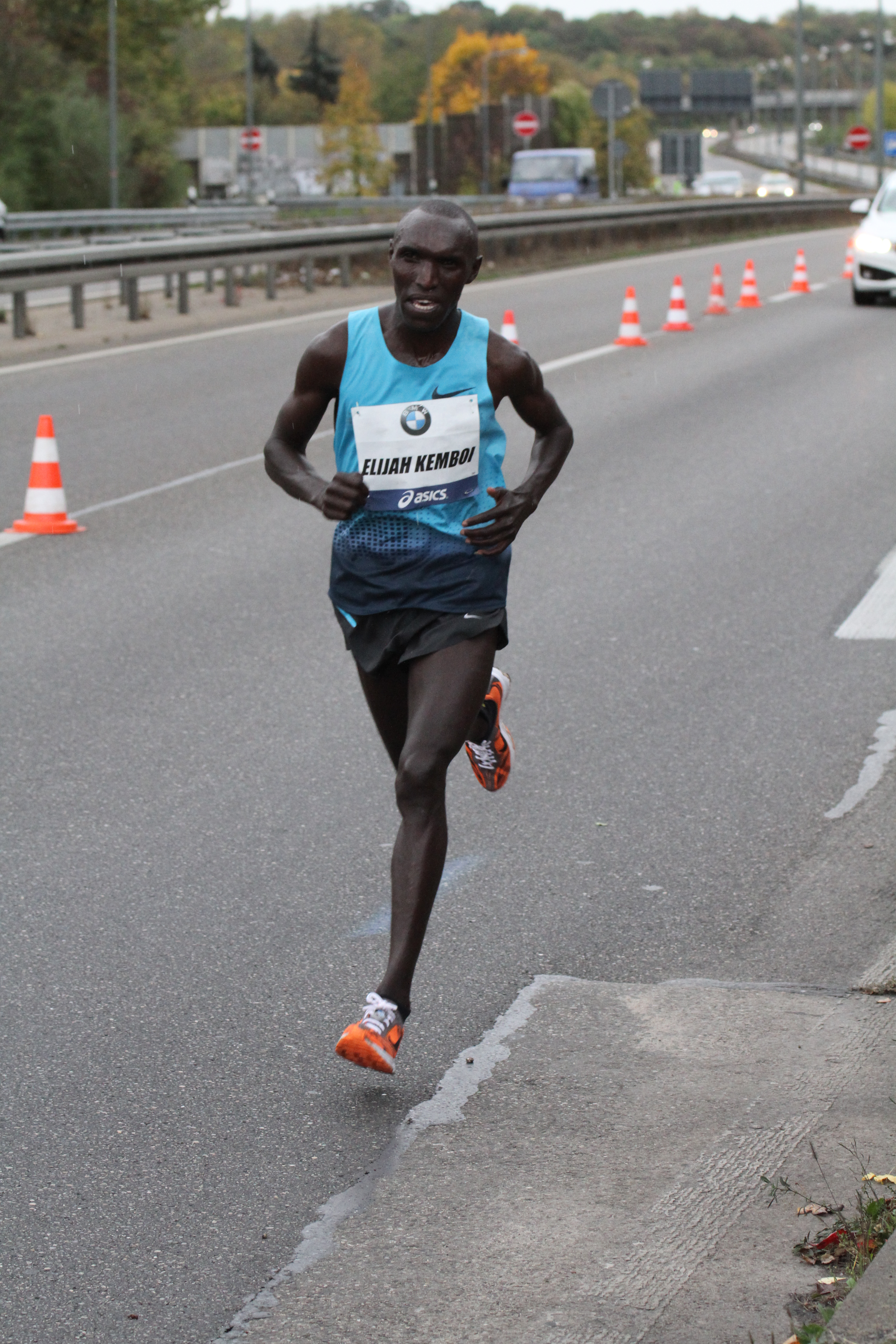
Kemboi at the 2013 Frankfurt Marathon

Elijah Kiprono Kemboi (born 1984) is a Kenyan long-distance runner who competes in marathon races. He has won marathons in Košice and Antwerp. His personal best for the event is 2:07:34 hours. He competed in Kenyan road races in his early twenties, and the Nairobi Marathon was his first experience of the distance (14th in 2008 and 21st in 2009). It was not until 2011 that he started racing at the top level in European marathons. That year saw him win the Antwerp Marathon in a course record time of 2:11:15 hours. He matched that time to win the Košice Peace Marathon in October. The following year he was tenth at the Barcelona Marathon (2:12:15), but was much improved on his return to Košice: although he failed to defend his title and ended the race in fourth, he set a new lifetime best of 2:07:51 hours for the distance.

In his first race of 2013, he placed third at the Mumbai Marathon with a run of 2:10:03 hours. The Porto Half Marathon saw him finish as runner-up in a personal best of 1:02:19 hours. This prepared him for the Frankfurt Marathon in October, where he was a comfortable third in a time of 2:07:34 hours – another personal best.
