= Raheny Shamrock Athletic Club =

Athletics club in Dublin, Ireland

Raheny Shamrock Athletic Club, founded in 1958, is an athletic club in Raheny, Dublin, Ireland, one of Ireland's oldest athletics clubs still operating and one of the most active. Raheny athletes compete in a wide range of events including every National Championship.

== History ==
The club was founded by Paddy Boland, partly based on local traditional annual sports activities.

== Honours ==
- National Senior Cross Country Champions Men - 2016, 2017
- National Senior Cross Country Champions Women - 1968, 1971, 2013
- National Road Relay Champions Men - 2001, 2003, 2004, 2009, 2010, 2011, 2016, 2017
- National Road Relay Champions Women - 1995, 2003, 2007, 2008, 2010

== Key figures ==
The club has provided five Olympic athletes, with seven appearances: Dick Hooper (1980, 1984, 1988); Pat Hooper (1980); Paddy McGrath (2000); Mick Clohisey (2016); and Sophie Becker (2020).

== Facilities ==
The club makes extensive use of quiet local roads but especially of Dublin city's second-largest municipal park, St. Anne's Park. It had a modest clubhouse in the centre of Raheny, in a former schoolhouse on the banks of the Santry River, before securing the use of the former Catholic church, St Assam's. Plans exist for a long-term clubhouse on city-owned land near the Raheny National Schools complex and other sports club bases.

== Colours ==
The club's colours are white and green. The Club's kit is a White Vest with an emerald Green Band across the chest with the word Raheny embedded. Shorts are emerald green.

== Races ==
The Shamrocks promote 36 races a year, including:

- Raheny 5 Mile Road Race - Last Sunday of January each year, a major national event, starting in Raheny Village and around St. Anne's Park
- Mid-Summers 5K
- Winter League Road Race Series - Held Between November and April, including Four 3 Mile Races, Four 2 Mile Races and Three 1 Mile Races
- Raheny Mile - incorporates the final Round of the Winter League
- The Holland Cup - 3 Mile Sealed Handicap Road Race
- Lord Mayor Two Mile Series - 12 two mile (3 km) races held between June and August.
- The Jim Wall Cup - Three Mile Open Handicap Road Race
- Joe Noonan Cup - Six Mile and Three Mile Road Race
- Christmas Day Mile - Held in association with GOAL
- St.Stephens Day Parlaufs
- Brian Boru 10 - 10 Mile road race which features the Leinster 10 Mile Championship
- St. Annes 4x400m race through the woods.
- Fit4Life Series - Six Two Mile Races aimed for people new and returning to the Sport
- National Road Relays - Hosted in association with Athletics Ireland
