= Steve Kenyon =

English long-distance runner

Personal information
- Nationality: British (English)
- Born: 16 September 1951 (age 75) Lancashire, England

Sport
- Sport: Athletics
- Event: long-distance
- Club: Bolton AC

Stephen Kenyon (born 16 September 1951) is a retired male long-distance runner from England, who competed in the late 1970s and early 1980s in the men's marathon and half marathon.

== Biography ==
Kenyon was raised in Bolton, England and is a life member of both Bolton United Harriers & Salford Harriers.

Kenyon became the British marathon champion after winning the British AAA Championships title at the 1982 AAA Championships. It was during this victory that he set his personal best of 2:11:40 over the classic distance on 13 June 1982 in Gateshead.

He competed in nine World Cross Country Championships, with his highest finish being 17th at the 1980 race, where he was a member of the winning England team. He won the Great North Run in 1985.

== Achievements ==
Year	Competition	Venue	Position	Event	Notes
Representing United Kingdom and England
1979	New York City Marathon	New York City, United States	3rd	Marathon	2:13:29
1981	Egmond Half Marathon	Egmond, Netherlands	1st	Half marathon	1:08:03
1981	Tokyo Marathon	Tokyo, Japan	6th	Marathon	2:12:34
1981	Manchester Charity	Manchester, England	1st	Marathon	2:11:54
1982	European Championships	Athens, Greece	—	Marathon	DNF
1985	Great North Run	South Shields, United Kingdom	1st	Half marathon	1:02:44

- 1986 3rd Great North Run
- 1982 AAA Marathon Champion
- 1979 3rd New York Marathon

Personal Bests:

- 5,000 m 13:45
- 10,000 m 28:20
- 10 mile 46:11
- half marathon 61:31
- marathon 2:11:40
