= Emmanuel Ndiemandoi =

Tanzanian long-distance runner

Personal information
- Nationality: Tanzanian
- Born: 1953 (age 72–73)

Sport
- Sport: Long-distance running
- Event: Marathon

Emmanuel Ndiemandoi (born 1953) is a Tanzanian long-distance runner. He competed in the marathon at the 1980 Summer Olympics.
