= Ryszard Marczak =

Polish long-distance runner

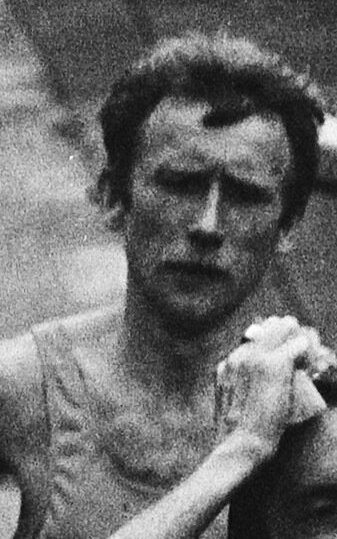
Marczak in 1982

Ryszard Antoni Marczak (born 25 November 1945 in Gdynia, Pomorskie) is a Polish former long-distance runner who represented his native country at the 1980 Summer Olympics in Moscow, USSR. He set his personal best (2:11:35) in the classic distance in 1981.

== Achievements ==
Year	Competition	Venue	Position	Event	Notes
Representing Poland
1980	Olympic Games	Moscow, Soviet Union	—	Marathon	DNF
1981	New York City Marathon	New York, United States	5th	Marathon	2:11:35
1982	European Championships	Athens, Greece	7th	Marathon	2:17:53
1982	New York City Marathon	New York, United States	4th	Marathon	2:12:44
1983	World Championships	Helsinki, Finland	16th	Marathon	2:13:20
