= Hans-Joachim Truppel =

German long-distance runner (born 1951)

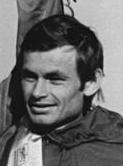
- Hans-Joachim Truppel in 1980

Personal information
- Nationality: German
- Born: 24 March 1951 (age 75) Kamsdorf, East Germany

Sport
- Sport: Long-distance running
- Event: Marathon

Hans-Joachim Truppel (born 24 March 1951) is a German long-distance runner. He competed in the marathon at the 1980 Summer Olympics where he finished in 11th place in a time of 2:14:55; like the winner Waldemar Cierpinski, he represented East Germany. The following year he won the Košice Peace Marathon in Czechoslovakia (today Slovak Republic) in a time of 2:16:58. His big early victory took place eight years earlier, in 1973 at the Dębno Marathon (Poland) which Truppel won in a time of 2:16:08. He set his P.R. of 2:11:56 in 1980.
