= Armand Parmentier =

Belgian long-distance runner

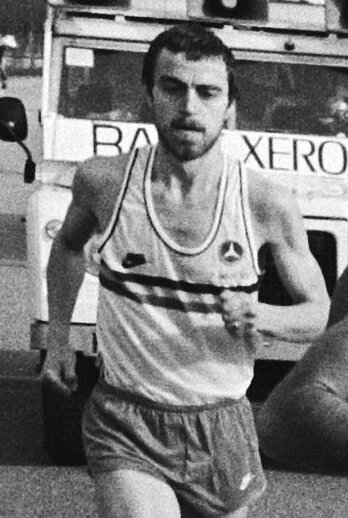
- Parmentier in 1983

Medal record

Representing Belgium

Men's Athletics

European Championships
Silver medal – second place	Athens 1982	Marathon

Armand Parmentier (born 15 February 1954 in Waregem, West Flanders) is a Belgian former long-distance runner who represented his native country in the men's marathon at the 1984 Summer Olympics in Los Angeles. There, he finished in 30th position, clocking 2:18:10. Two years earlier, he won the silver medal in the classic distance at the 1982 European Championships.

== Achievements ==
Year	Competition	Venue	Position	Event	Notes
Representing Belgium
1982	European Championships	Athens, Greece	2nd	Marathon	2:15:51
1983	World Championships	Helsinki, Finland	6th	Marathon	2:10:57
1984	Olympic Games	Los Angeles, United States	30th	Marathon	2:18:10
