= Gordon Perry (wheelchair athlete) =

British wheelchair athlete

Gordon Perry is a British wheelchair athlete who has competed in wheelchair racing and wheelchair basketball. The winner of the inaugural London Marathon wheelchair race, Perry competed in a number of wheelchair races during his racing career. He was a long-time wheelchair basketball competitor and coach, having played in competition in Great Britain and as a member of the British national team in the early 1980s. Perry now runs the Wheelchair Basketball Experience, a coaching and training company.
