= Kjell-Erik Ståhl =

Swedish long-distance runner

Personal information
- Nationality: Swedish
- Born: 17 February 1946 Killeberg, Skåne, Sweden
- Died: 5 August 2025 (aged 79)
- Height: 189 cm (6 ft 2 in)
- Weight: 69 kg (152 lb)

Sport
- Sport: Track and field, cross country
- Events: 800 m, 1500 m, 3000 m, 5000 m, 10000 m, cross country

Kjell-Erik Bertil Ståhl (17 February 1946 – 5 August 2025) was a long-distance runner from Sweden. He represented his native country twice at the Summer Olympics (1980 and 1984) in the men's marathon, finishing in 19th place in Moscow. Ståhl twice won the Stockholm Marathon. He held the Swedish marathon record with a time of 2:10:38, set in 1983, until it was surpassed in 2019.

He holds the Single Age World Record in the marathon for men who are 49 years of age, at 2:19:47, set on 10 June 1995 in Stockholm (source: Association of Road Racing Statisticians, updated 1 Nov 2019). In 2007, the German issue of Runners World featured an article about him. In one 12-month period, between August 1981 and August 1982, he ran 14 marathons with an average finishing time of 2:16:11. Between 1979 and 1998, he completed 101 marathons. In 70 of those, he finished in under two hours and twenty minutes, winning 17. He won the 1986 Stockholm marathon at the age of 40 in 2:12:33. In 1983, three weeks before the World Championship in Helsinki, he ran 190 km in a week, while employed full time.

His personal bests included:

- 800m 1:56.8 (1967)
- 1,500m 3:54.5 (1973)
- 3,000m steeplechase 8:46.7 (1974)
- 5000m 14:11.9 min (1979)
- 10,000m 29:48.0 min (1979)
- Marathon in 2:10:38 (1983)

== Achievements ==
| Year | Competition | Venue | Position | Event | Notes |
Representing Sweden
| 1980 | Olympic Games | Moscow, Soviet Union | 19th | Marathon | 2:17:44 |
| 1981 | Beijing Marathon | Beijing, PR China | 1st | Marathon | 2:15:20 |
| 1981 | Frankfurt Marathon | Frankfurt, West Germany | 1st | Marathon | 2:13:20 |
| 1981 | New York City Marathon | New York, United States | 12th | Marathon | 2:13:31 |
| 1981 | Fukuoka Marathon | Fukuoka, Japan | 12th | Marathon | 2:14:13 |
| 1982 | Stockholm Marathon | Stockholm, Sweden | 1st | Marathon | 2:19:20 |
| 1982 | Boston Marathon | Boston, United States | 5th | Marathon | 2:12:47 |
| 1982 | European Championships | Athens, Greece | 10th | Marathon | 2:20:36 |
| 1982 | Rome City Marathon | Rome, Italy | 8th | Marathon | 2:15:24 |
| 1983 | World Championships | Helsinki, Finland | 4th | Marathon | 2:10:38 |
| 1984 | Olympic Games | Los Angeles, United States | — | Marathon | DNF |
| 1986 | Stockholm Marathon | Stockholm, Sweden | 1st | Marathon | 2:12:33 |
| 1986 | European Championships | Stuttgart, West Germany | 9th | Marathon | 2:13:14 |
| 1994 | European Championships | Helsinki, Finland | — | Marathon | DNF |
