= Li Jong-hyong =

North Korean long-distance runner

Li Jong-Hyong
Personal information
- Nationality: North Korean
- Born: 3 January 1956 (age 70)

Sport
- Sport: Long-distance running
- Event: Marathon
Medal record
Men's athletics
Representing North Korea
Asian Championships
Gold medal – first place	1985 Jakarta	Marathon

Li Jong-Hyong (born 3 January 1956) is a North Korean long-distance runner. He competed in the marathon at the 1980 Summer Olympics. He also competed in the marathon and finished 34th at the 1st IAAF World Athletics Championships on 1983.
