= Jørn Lauenborg =

Danish long-distance runner

Personal information
- Nationality: Danish
- Born: 14 September 1944 (age 81) Odense, Denmark

Sport
- Sport: Long-distance running
- Event: Marathon

Jørn Lauenborg (born 14 September 1944) is a Danish long-distance runner. He competed in the marathon at the 1980 Summer Olympics.
