= Willem Van Schuerbeeck =

Belgian long-distance runner

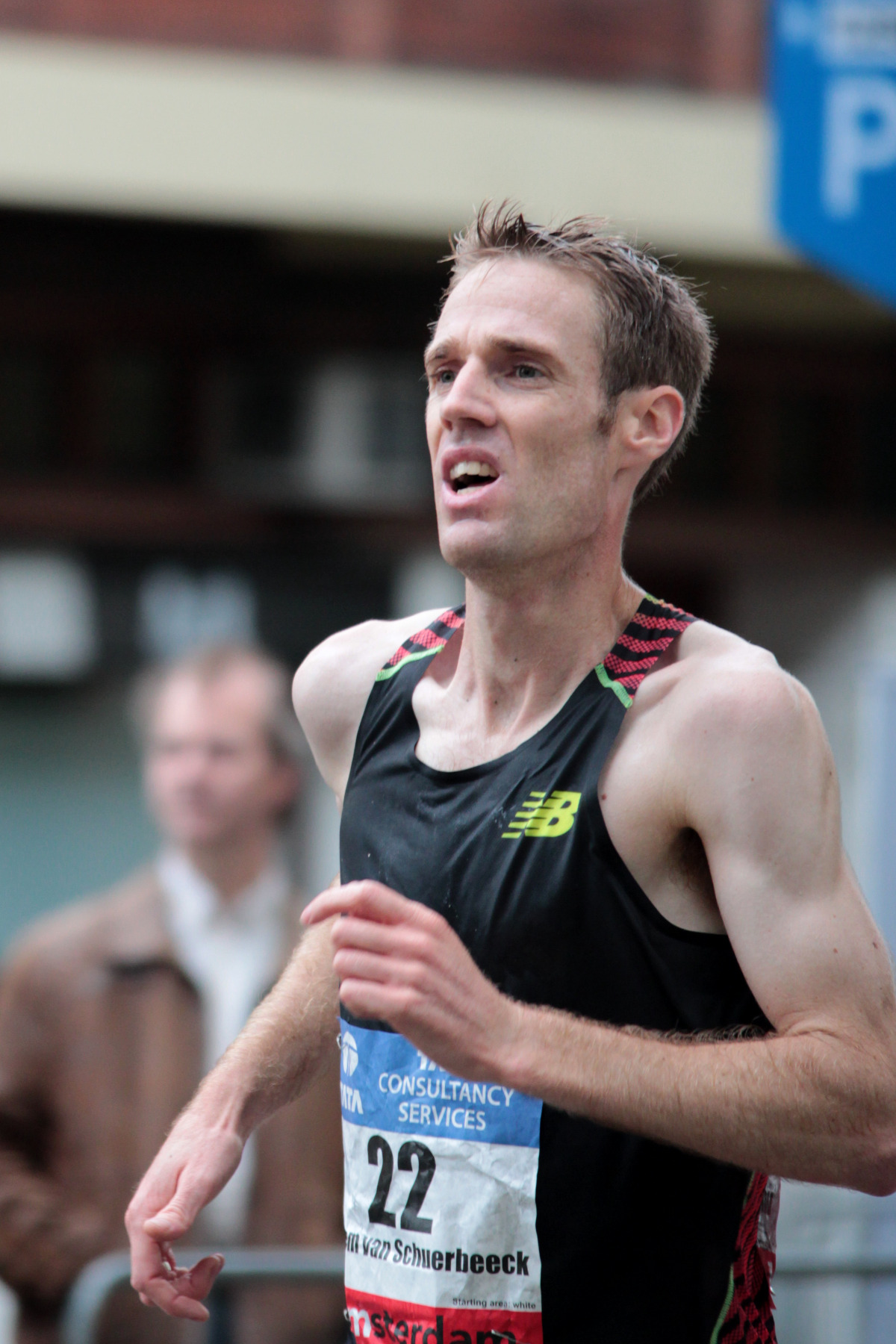
- Van Schuerbeeck at the 2014 Amsterdam Marathon

Personal information
- Nationality: Belgian
- Born: 24 October 1984 (age 41)
- Height: 1.78 m (5 ft 10 in)
- Weight: 60 kg (132 lb)

Sport
- Country: Belgium
- Sport: Athletics
- Event: Long-distance
- Club: VAC - Koninklijke Vilvoorde Atletiek Club
- Coached by: Guido Hartensveld

Willem Van Schuerbeeck (born 24 October 1984) is a Belgian long-distance runner. He competed in the marathon at the 2016 Summer Olympics on 21 August 2016 finishing 56th in 2:18:56.

== Biography ==
Willem Van Schuerbeeck was born in 1984 and has two sisters and a brother. He lives in Merchtem and is married and father of a son and daughter. He works as a teacher in physical education in Brussels.

== Olympic qualification ==
With a personal best of 2 hours 12 minutes and 49 seconds (achieved at the 2015 Berlin Marathon), Van Schuerbeeck was the second-fastest Belgian runner to meet the requirements for qualification of the Belgian Olympic Committee.
