= Michalis Kousis =

Greek long-distance runner

Michalis Koussis (Greek: Μιχάλης Κούσης; 10 October 1953 – 24 May 2005) was a Greek Olympian Marathon and long-distance runner.

Koussis was born in 1953 in Agrinio in Aetolia-Acarnania, western Greece. He was an athlete of the Agrinio Gymnast Company (GEA) and a member of the Greece national team from 1971 to 1987. He participated in the Olympic Games in 1976 and in 1984 and achieved many Panhellenic and Balkan records in marathon running. He finished fourth in the 1980 Boston Marathon. His greatest moment was the gold medal which he won in 1979, during the Mediterranean Games, in Split (present-day Croatia), where he finished 1st in a time then considered a world record. Subsequently it was announced that the course was remeasured and found shorter than the official marathon distance. In the same year, he was named the Greek Male Athlete of the Year. He ran for the 1982 European Championships Marathon.

== Olympics ==
He was included in the Greece delegations in the 1976, 1980, and 1984 Summer Olympic Games.

He died in 2005, from heart problems, while training on Seih Sou in Thessaloniki.
