= Pat Hooper =

Irish long-distance runner (1952–2020)

Personal information
- Nationality: Irish
- Born: 12 May 1952 Raheny, Dublin, Ireland
- Died: 9 October 2020 (aged 68)
- Height: 5 ft 11 in (180 cm)
- Weight: 150 lb (68 kg)

Sport
- Sport: Running
- Event: Marathon
- Club: Raheny Shamrock Athletic Club
Medal record
Running
Marathon
Silver medal – second place	1980 Irish National Championships
Gold medal – first place	1979 Irish National Championships

Patrick Hooper (12 May 1952 – 9 October 2020) was an Olympian and long-distance runner from Raheny, Dublin, Ireland.

== Career ==
He represented Ireland in the marathon at European and Olympic level. His marathon personal best time was 2:17:46. He was the older brother of three-time Olympian and marathoner Dick Hooper. After his retirement from active competition, Hooper remained extremely active in the sport, as a long-serving committee member of his club, Raheny Shamrock Athletic Club, and as a member of the Dublin and Leinster Athletics Boards.

Hooper died on 9 October 2020, aged 68, of a suspected heart attack.

== Achievements ==
- All results regarding marathon

Year	Competition	Venue	Position	Event	Notes
1980	Olympic Games	Moscow, Soviet Union	42nd	2:30:28	1 August
1980	Irish National Championships	Tullamore, County Offaly	Silver	2:19:53	8 July
1979	Irish National Championships	Tullamore, County Offaly	Gold	2:17:46 PB	18 May
1978	European Championships	Prague, Czechoslovakia	27th	2:20:29	3 September
