= Tommy Persson =

Swedish long-distance runner

Lars Tommy Persson (born 23 December 1954 in Östra Grevie, Skåne) is a retired long-distance runner from Sweden. He represented his native country twice at the Summer Olympics (1980 and 1984) in the men's marathon, finishing in 30th place in Moscow. Persson, nicknamed "Tomis", won the 1985 Stockholm Marathon.

== Achievements ==
Year	Competition	Venue	Position	Event	Notes
Representing Sweden
1980	Olympic Games	Moscow, Soviet Union	30th	Marathon	2:21:11
1981	Tokyo Marathon	Tokyo, Japan	2nd	Marathon	2:12:07
1981	New York City Marathon	New York, United States	10th	Marathon	2:13:23
1981	Fukuoka Marathon	Fukuoka, Japan	7th	Marathon	2:12:19
1982	Miami Marathon	Miami, United States	2nd	Marathon	2:12:32
1982	European Championships	Athens, Greece	—	Marathon	DNF
1983	World Championships	Helsinki, Finland	22nd	Marathon	2:14:57
1984	Olympic Games	Los Angeles, United States	—	Marathon	DNF
1985	Stockholm Marathon	Stockholm, Sweden	1st	Marathon	2:17:18
