= Vladimir Kotov =

Belarusian long-distance runner

Vladimir Kotov (Belarusian: Уладзімір Андрэевіч Котаў; born February 21, 1958, in Dolzha, Vitebsk) is a Belarus-born South African long-distance runner, who competed for the Soviet Union at the marathon of the 1980 Summer Olympics in Moscow. There he finished in fourth place, thirty seconds behind countryman and bronze medalist Setymkul Dzhumanazarov. Kotov has a very long career in athletics, during which he won the Eindhoven Marathon for instance, on October 13, 1991, and the Belgrade Marathon on April 22, 1995. He now lives in South Africa, where he is known for winning the Comrades Marathon three times (2000, 2002, 2004), setting the "Up Run" record in 2000. He finished 13th in the 2010 Comrades Marathon.

== Achievements ==
| Year | Competition | Venue | Position | Event | Notes |
Representing Soviet Union
| 1980 | Olympic Games | Moscow, Soviet Union | 4th | Marathon | 2:12:05 |
| 1981 | Fukuoka Marathon | Fukuoka, Japan | 8th | Marathon | 2:12:25 |
| 1982 | European Championships | Athens, Greece | — | Marathon | DNF |
Representing Belarus
| 1991 | Eindhoven Marathon | Eindhoven, Netherlands | 1st | Marathon | 2:14:03 |
| 1993 | World Championships | Stuttgart, Germany | 22nd | Marathon | 2:24:26 |
| 1995 | Belgrade Marathon | Belgrade, Yugoslavia | 1st | Marathon | 2:14:00 |
