= Pertti Tiainen =

Finnish long-distance runner

Personal information
- Nationality: Finnish
- Born: 15 November 1954 (age 71) Sysmä, Finland

Sport
- Sport: Long-distance running
- Event: Marathon

Pertti Pellervo Tiainen (born 15 November 1954) is a Finnish long-distance runner. He competed in the marathon at the 1984 Summer Olympics.
