= Mike Gratton =

British long distance runner

Personal information
- Nationality: British (English)
- Born: 28 November 1954 (age 71) Aldershot, Hampshire, England

Sport
- Sport: Athletics
- Event: long distance / marathon
- Club: Invicta AC
Medal record
Athletics
Representing England
Commonwealth Games
Bronze medal – third place	1982 Brisbane	marathon

Michael Colin Gratton (born 28 November 1954) is a male former elite long distance runner from England who won the 1983 London Marathon.

== Biography ==
A member of the Kent athletics club Invicta AC, Gratton finished third behind Hugh Jones in the marathon event at the 1981 AAA Championships.

He represented England and won a bronze medal in the marathon event (2:12:06), at the 1982 Commonwealth Games in Brisbane, Australia and the following year was the winner of the London Marathon. He won the 1983 London Marathon in a time of 2:09:43, a time which places him 14th on the UK all-time marathon list and gave him the title of British marathon champion.

Gratton now runs a sports holiday company called 2:09 Events and a running resource website called Coach the Run. He has gained a recent following through a well-known online forum on the Runners World website called “Hard Training with Mike Gratton.”

== Competition record ==
Year	Competition	Venue	Position	Event	Notes
Representing United Kingdom and England
1982	London Marathon	London, United Kingdom	3rd	Marathon	2:12:30
1982	Commonwealth Games	Brisbane, Australia	3rd	Marathon	2:12:06
1983	London Marathon	London, United Kingdom	1st	Marathon	2:09:43
1983	World Championships	Helsinki, Finland	—	Marathon	DNF
1985	London Marathon	London, United Kingdom	11th	Marathon	2:14:35
1989	Paris Marathon	Paris, France	11th	Marathon	2:17:06
