= Kebede Balcha =

Ethiopian marathon runner

Medal record

Men's athletics

Representing Ethiopia

African Championships
Gold medal – first place	1979 Dakar	Marathon
Silver medal – second place	1985 Cairo	Marathon
Silver medal – second place	1989 Lagos	Marathon
Bronze medal – third place	1988 Annaba	Marathon

Kebede Balcha (7 September 1951 – 10 July 2018) was a marathon runner from Ethiopia. He won the silver medal at the 1983 World Championships. He is the current record holder for the Montreal International Marathon with 2 hours 10 minutes 3 seconds in 1983. In 1999, he sought asylum in Toronto, where he lived until his death in 2019.

== International competitions ==
Year	Competition	Venue	Position	Event	Notes
Representing Ethiopia
1979	African Championships	Dakar, Senegal	1st	Marathon	2:29:53
1980	Olympic Games	Moscow, Soviet Union	—	Marathon	DNF
1983	World Championships	Helsinki, Finland	2nd	Marathon	2:10:27
1985	African Championships	Cairo, Egypt	2nd	Marathon	2:24:31
1987	All-Africa Games	Nairobi, Kenya	3rd	Marathon	2:16:07

== Road races ==
Year	Competition	Venue	Position	Event	Notes
1977	Athens Classic Marathon	Athens, Greece	1st	Marathon	2:14:40.8
1979	Montreal International Marathon	Montréal, Canada	1st	Marathon	2:11:35
1981	Montreal International Marathon	Montréal, Canada	1st	Marathon	2:11:11
1983	Tokyo Marathon	Tokyo, Japan	6th	Marathon	2:12:07
1983	London Marathon	London, United Kingdom	4th	Marathon	2:11:32
1983	Montreal International Marathon	Montréal, Canada	1st	Marathon	2:10:03
1984	Frankfurt Marathon	Frankfurt, Germany	2nd	Marathon	2:11:40
1985	Tokyo Marathon	Tokyo, Japan	2nd	Marathon	2:12:01
1985	1985 World Marathon Cup	Hiroshima, Japan	11th	Marathon	2:11:19
1985	Montreal International Marathon	Montréal, Canada	1st	Marathon	2:12:39
1986	Tokyo Marathon	Tokyo, Japan	11th	Marathon	2:14:11
1988	Rotterdam Marathon	Rotterdam, Netherlands	6th	Marathon	2:12:04
1988	Fukuoka Marathon	Fukuoka, Japan	10th	Marathon	2:12:55
