= Delfim Moreira (runner) =

Portuguese long-distance runner

Personal information
- Full name: Delfim José Teixeira Moreira
- Nationality: Portuguese
- Born: 11 December 1955 (age 69)

Sport
- Sport: Long-distance running
- Event: Marathon

Delfim José Teixeira Moreira (born 11 December 1955) is a Portuguese long-distance runner. He competed in the marathon at the 1984 Summer Olympics.
