= Dick Hooper =

Irish long-distance runner and Olympian

Personal information
- Nationality: Irish
- Born: 26 August 1956 (age 69) Dublin
- Height: 5 ft 9 in (175 cm)
- Weight: 150 lb (68 kg)

Sport
- Sport: Running
- Event: Marathon
- Club: Raheny Shamrock Athletic Club
Medal record
Representing Ireland
Men’s Athletics
Dublin Marathon
| Gold medal – first place | 1980 Dublin Marathon | Men's Marathon |
| Gold medal – first place | 1985 Dublin Marathon | Men's Marathon |
| Gold medal – first place | 1986 Dublin Marathon | Men's Marathon |

Richard Hooper (born 26 August 1956) is a former long-distance runner from Raheny, Dublin, Ireland.

== Career ==
He represented Ireland in the Olympic marathon in Moscow 1980, Los Angeles 1984 and Seoul 1988. He also represented Ireland four times in the European Championships - in Czechoslovakia 1978, Athens 1982, Stuttgart 1986 and Split 1990.

He is a three-time record-holding winner of the Dublin Marathon in 1980, 1985 and 1988 and he set his personal best time at the 1988 Irish National Championship in Wexford, clocking 2:12:19 finishing in 2nd place behind John Woods. He went on to win a record six national marathon championships winning his last in 1998 at the age of 42.

He is the younger brother of marathoner Pat Hooper, and, having had a career in banking, also worked as a coach, and an athletics commentator on Setanta Sports and Irish TV.

== Achievements ==
- All results regarding marathon, unless stated otherwise

| Year | Competition | Venue | Position | Notes | |
Representing Ireland
| 1978 | Irish National Marathon Championship | Tullamore | Gold | 2:23:19 | 18 June 1978 |
| 1978 | 1978 European Championships in Athletics | Prague | 29th | 2:21:01 | 3 September 1978 |
| 1980 | Dublin Marathon | Dublin | Gold | 2:16:14 | 26 October 1980 |
| 1980 | Irish National Marathon Championship | Tullamore | Gold | 2:16:27 | 8 July 1980 |
| 1980 | Moscow Olympics | Moscow | 38th place | 2:23:53 | 1 August 1980 |
| 1981 | Irish National Marathon Championship | Cork | Gold | 2:15:37 | 7 June 1981 |
| 1982 | Irish National Marathon Championship | Limerick | Gold | 2:12:56 | 6 June 1982 |
| 1982 | 1982 European Championships in Athletics – Men's Marathon | Athens | 11th place | 2:20:51 | 12 September 1982 |
| 1984 | Irish National Marathon Championship | Cork | Gold | 2:14:39 | 23 April 1984 |
| 1984 | Los Angeles Olympics | Los Angeles | 51st place | 2:24:41 | 12 August 1984 |
| 1985 | Dublin Marathon | Dublin | Gold | 2:13:48 | 27 October 1985 |
| 1986 | Dublin Marathon | Dublin | Gold | 2:18:10 | 26 October 1986 |
| 1986 | 1986 European Athletics Championships – Men's marathon | Stuttgart | 16th place | 2:17.45 | 30 August 1986 |
| 1987 | 1987 Dublin Marathon | Dublin | Bronze | 2:14:36 | 25 October 1987 |
| 1988 | Irish National Marathon Championship | Wexford | Silver | 2:12:19 PB | 24 April 1988 |
| 1988 | Seoul Olympics | Seoul | 24th place | 2:17:16 | 2 October 1988 |
| 1990 | 1990 European Championships in Athletics – Men's Marathon | Split | 23rd place | 2:32.36 | 1 September 1990 |
| 1998 | Irish National Marathon Championship | Killenaule | Gold | (2:22:08) | 19 April 1998 |
| 1998 | New York City Marathon | New York City | 34th place | 2:22:46 | 1 November 1998 |
