= Derek Clayton =

Australian long-distance runner (born 1942)

Personal information
- Nationality: English/Australian
- Born: 17 November 1942 (age 82) Barrow-in-Furness, England
- Height: 187 cm (6 ft 2 in)
- Weight: 72 kg (159 lb)

Sport
- Sport: Athletics
- Event: long-distance
- Club: St. Stephens Harriers

Derek James Clayton (born 17 November 1942) is a former Australian long-distance runner, born in Cumbria, England and raised in Northern Ireland.

== Biography ==
Clayton set a marathon world best in the Fukuoka Marathon, Japan on 3 December 1967 in 2:09:36.4, in what is considered a classic race, the first marathon race ever run in less than two hours and ten minutes.

He went on to break this time at the Antwerp Marathon on 30 May 1969 by more than a minute; this time stood as the world best for nearly another 12 years. (Note: The International Association of Athletics Federations has published a progression of road racing world bests and records that were widely recognized prior to ratification and official acceptance by the IAAF. According to that progression, Clayton's 2:08:34 performance in Antwerp on 30 May 1969 was a world best at the time. Other road racing authorities, including the Association of Road Racing Statisticians, consider Clayton's performance to have occurred on a short course and recognize other athletes in the progression for world best in the marathon.) His personal best time of 2:08:33.6 is still a world-class marathon time. Clayton represented Australia at the 1968 Summer Olympics in Mexico City, finishing in 7th place (2:27:23). Four years later, he finished in 13th place (2:19:49) in the same event.

Clayton finished second behind Ron Hill in the marathon event at the 1969 AAA Championships.

At the 1971 Australian Athletics Championships, he won the marathon in 2:11:08.8. Two years later, in 1973, he won the Australian Athletics Championships marathon again in 2:12:07.6. He also won the marathon in this event in 1967 and 1968. Clayton won 14 marathons in his career.

Clayton was inducted into the Sport Australia Hall of Fame in 1999.

== Notes ==
Records
Preceded by (Japan) Morio Shigematsu	Men's Marathon World Record Holder; 3 December 1967 – 6 December 1981	Succeeded by (Australia) Robert de Castella
