= Henri Schoofs =

Belgian athlete

Rik Schoofs
Personal information
- Nationality: Belgian
- Born: Hendrik Schoofs; 6 November 1950 (age 74) Borgloon

Sport
- Sport: Long-distance running
- Event: Marathon

Hendrik "Rik" Schoofs (born 6 November 1950) is a Belgian long-distance runner. He competed in the marathon at the 1976 Summer Olympics and the 1980 Summer Olympics.
