= Karel Lismont =

Belgian long-distance runner (born 1949)

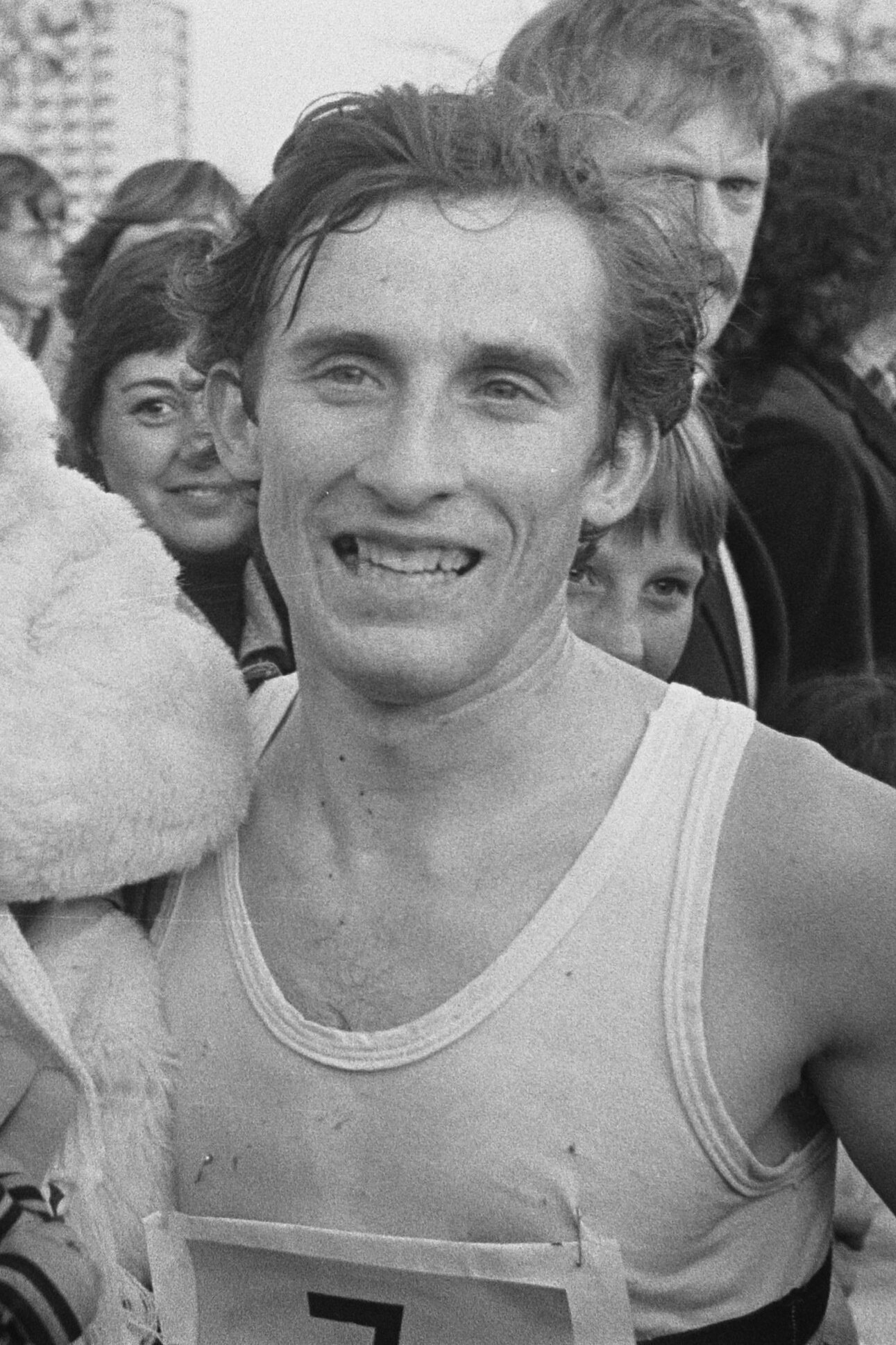
- Karel Lismont in 1976

Personal information
- Born: 8 March 1949 (age 77) Borgloon, Belgium
- Height: 1.68 m (5 ft 6 in)
- Weight: 62 kg (137 lb)

Sport
- Sport: Long-distance running
- Club: RFC, Liège
Medal record
Men's athletics
Representing Belgium
Olympic Games
Silver medal – second place	1972 Munich	Marathon
Bronze medal – third place	1976 Montreal	Marathon
European Championships
Gold medal – first place	1971 Helsinki	Marathon
Bronze medal – third place	1978 Prague	Marathon
Bronze medal – third place	1982 Athens	Marathon

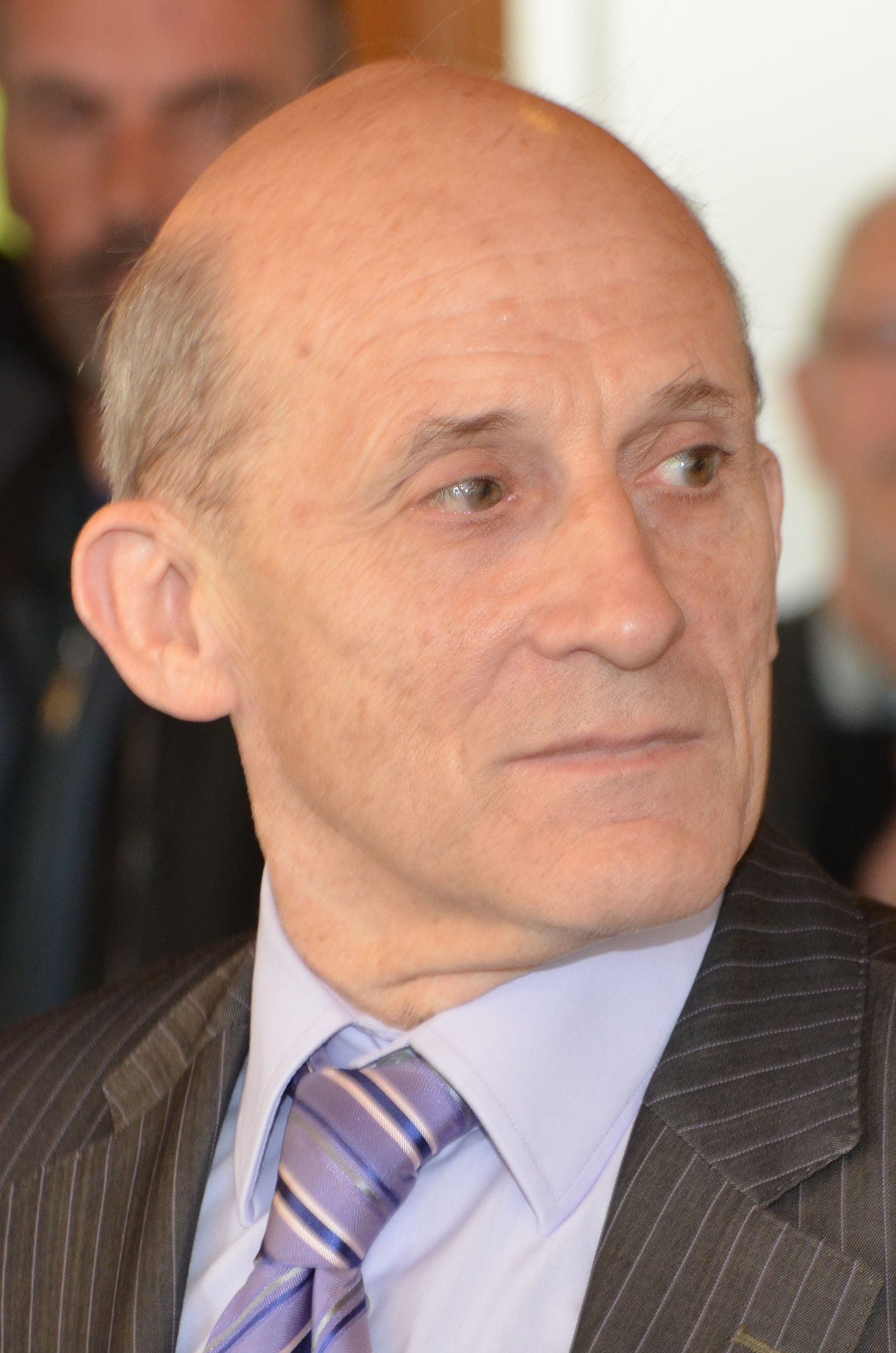
Lismont in 2012

Karel Lismont (Dutch pronunciation: [ˈkaːrəl ˈlɪsmɔnt], French pronunciation: [kaʁɛl lismɔ̃]; born 8 March 1949) is a former Belgian long-distance runner. He competed at the 1972, 1976, 1980 and 1984 Olympics in the marathon and 10,000 m events. He won two marathon medals: a silver in 1972 and a bronze in 1976, finishing ninth and twenty-fourth in 1980 and 1984, respectively; he was less successful in the 10,000 m, finishing eleventh in 1976 and failing to reach the final in 1972. His personal best for the marathon was 2:11:12.6 at the 1976 Olympic Games.

Lismont also won one gold and two bronze medals in the marathon at the 1971, and 1978 and 1982 European Championships. In cross country, he won the bronze medal at the 1978 IAAF World Cross Country Championships.

Lismont won the 1983 Berlin Marathon in 2:13:37. He won the first two Hamburg Marathons in 1986 and 1987, winning in 2:12:12 and 2:13:46, respectively.

Overall, Lismont recorded 10 marathon victories in his career. He has run 3 marathons under 2:12, 18 marathons under 2:15, and 24 marathons under 2:20. He remains the most successful medal-winning Belgian marathoner in international competition as of 2021.
