= David Cannon (athlete) =

British long-distance runner (born 1950)

David Albert Cannon (born 7 August 1950) is an English retired male long-distance runner, who competed in the late 1970s and early 1980s in the men's marathon. He won the 1981 edition of the Paris Marathon ex-æquo with USA's Ron Tabb.

Earlier in his running career, Cannon had been a successful fell runner, his many victories including several wins in the Ben Nevis Race. He was the British Fell Running Champion in 1972. Later, he guided Kenny Stuart in the latter's transition from the fells to road running.

== Marathons ==
Year	Competition	Venue	Position	Event	Notes
Representing United Kingdom and England
1980	Fukuoka Marathon	Fukuoka, Japan	10th	Marathon	2:11:35
1980	Montreal International Marathon	Montréal, Canada	1st	Marathon	2:11:21
1980	Auckland Marathon	Auckland, New Zealand	2nd	Marathon	2:13:44
1981	Auckland Marathon	Auckland, New Zealand	1st	Marathon	2:12:53
1981	Paris Marathon	Paris, France	1st	Marathon	2:11:44
1982	European Championships	Athens, Greece	12th	Marathon	2:21:33
1983	London Marathon	London, United Kingdom	11th	Marathon	2:12:51
