= Satymkul Dzhumanazarov =

Kyrgyzstani long-distance runner

Personal information
- Born: 17 September 1951 Talas Region, Soviet Union
- Died: 2 April 2007 (aged 55) Bishkek, Kyrgyzstan

Sport
- Sport: Track and field
Medal record
Representing Soviet Union
Olympic Games
Bronze medal – third place	1980 Moscow	Marathon

Satymkul Dzhumanazarov (Russian: Сатымкул Джуманазаров; 17 September 1951 – 2 April 2007) was a Soviet athlete from Kyrgyzstan who competed mainly in the marathon. He competed for the USSR at the 1980 Summer Olympics held in Moscow, Soviet Union, where he won the bronze medal in the men's marathon.

He came fifth at the 1981 Tokyo Marathon with a time of 2:12:31 hours.

Dzhumanazarov died after he accidentally fell off a balcony in Bishkek on 2 April 2007. He was 55 years old.

== International competitions ==
Year	Competition	Venue	Position	Event	Notes
Representing Soviet Union
1980	Olympic Games	Moscow, Soviet Union	3rd	Marathon	2:11:35
