= Gerard Nijboer =

Dutch long-distance runner (born 1955)

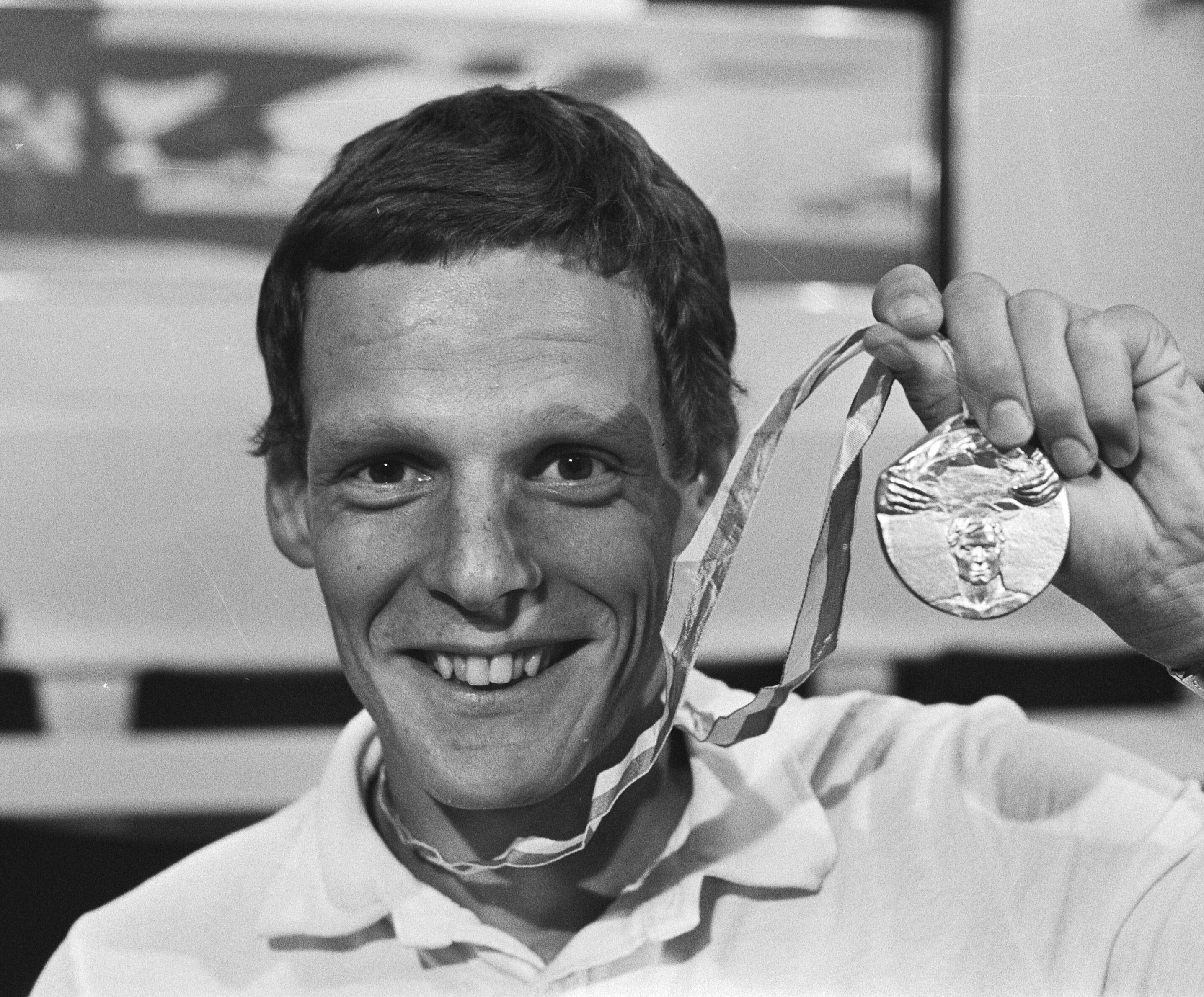
- Nijboer in 1982

Personal information
- Full name: Gerhardus Marinus Maria Nijboer
- Born: 18 August 1955 (age 70) Hasselt, Overijssel, Netherlands
- Height: 1.82 m (6 ft 0 in)
- Weight: 70 kg (154 lb)

Sport
- Country: Netherlands
- Sport: Athletics
- Event: Marathon
Medal record
Men's athletics
Representing the Netherlands
Olympic Games
Silver medal – second place	1980 Moscow	Marathon
European Championships
Gold medal – first place	1982 Athens	Marathon

Gerhardus Marinus Maria Nijboer (Dutch: [ɣeːˈrɑrdʏs maːˈrinʏs maːˈrijaː ˈnɛibuːr]; born 18 August 1955) is a Dutch former long-distance runner. Nijboer competed in three consecutive Summer Olympics, starting in 1980 (Moscow, Soviet Union), when he won the silver medal in the marathon. He became European champion in the marathon in 1982, for which he was named Dutch Sportsman of the year.

His personal best time was 2:09:01 at the Amsterdam Marathon of 26 April 1980, which was at the time the second best marathon ever (after Derek Clayton's 2:08:34 run in 1969). (Note: The International Association of Athletics Federations has published a progression of road racing world bests and records that were widely recognized prior to ratification and official acceptance by the IAAF. According to that progression, Clayton's 2:08:34 performance in Antwerp on 30 May 1969 was a world best at the time. Other road racing authorities, including the Association of Road Racing Statisticians, consider Clayton's performance to have occurred on a short course and recognize other athletes - including Nijboer - in the progression for world best in the marathon.)

== Notes ==
Awards
Preceded by Harry Schulting	Herman van Leeuwen Cup; 1980; 1982	Succeeded by Hans Koeleman
Preceded by Hans Koeleman	Herman van Leeuwen Cup; 1980; 1982	Succeeded by Rob Druppers
Preceded by Hennie Stamsnijder	Dutch Sportsman of the Year; 1982	Succeeded by Rob Druppers
