= Waldemar Cierpinski =

East German athlete (born 1950)

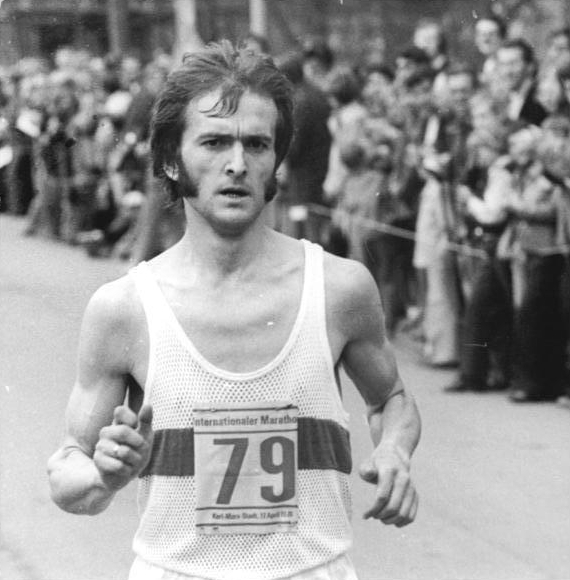
- Cierpinski in 1976

Medal record

Men's athletics

Representing East Germany

Olympic Games
Gold medal – first place	1976 Montreal	Marathon
Gold medal – first place	1980 Moscow	Marathon

World Championships
Bronze medal – third place	1983 Helsinki	Marathon

Waldemar Cierpinski (born 3 August 1950) is a former East German athlete and two-time Olympic champion in the marathon.

== Career ==
Cierpinski was born in Neugattersleben, East Germany to Polish parents who had moved to Germany in 1945. He was originally a successful steeplechase runner but decided to switch to the marathon in 1974.

He was virtually unknown when he entered the 1976 Olympic marathon. He ran with the lead pack until American Frank Shorter broke free after the 25 km mark. Cierpinski chased Shorter down then took the lead, winning the race by 51 seconds. His victory was so unexpected that in the Olympic football final that evening, goalkeeper Jürgen Croy, invoked Cierpinski, a "living example of mediocrity", to inspire East Germany to a 3–1 victory over fancied Poland.

Cierpinski finished in fourth place at the 1978 European Championships. In the 1980 Summer Olympics, he ran wisely and did not match the suicidal pace the leaders had set. He caught up to the leaders at the 36 km mark and soon led by a healthy margin. Although Gerard Nijboer from the Netherlands narrowed the gap in the last kilometre, Cierpinski sprinted the last 200 m to win his second consecutive Olympic gold medal and duplicate the feat of legendary Ethiopian Abebe Bikila of winning two straight Olympic marathons.

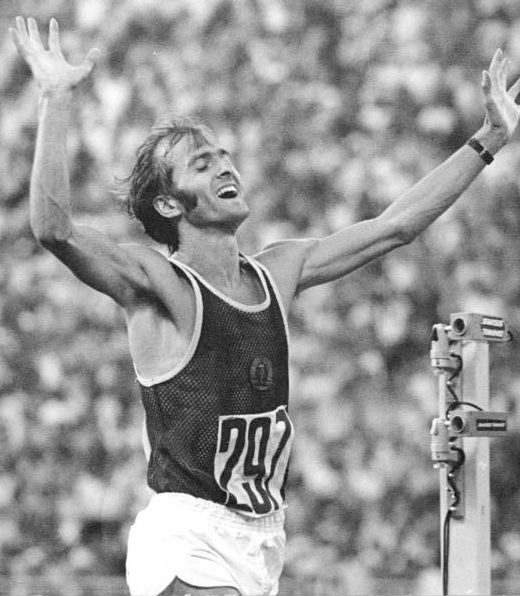
Cierpinski winning the marathon at the 1980 Summer Olympics

Cierpinski finished third in the marathon in the 1983 World Championships in Athletics. He was denied a chance of an unprecedented third Olympic marathon win by the Eastern Bloc boycott of the 1984 Summer Olympics in Los Angeles, which was tit for tat for the United States-led boycott of the 1980 Summer Olympics in Moscow. He left competition the same year and started a coaching career.

In Track & Field News World Rankings, Cierpinski was ranked first in the marathon in 1976 and 1980 and eighth in 1978 and 1983.

Cierpinski is a member of the German Olympic Committee. Since 2007, Cierpinski has been an honorary member of the SG WiP Goettingen 06. He lives in Halle an der Saale.

== Drug allegations ==
It is now well known that East Germany operated a state-sponsored system of providing performance-enhancing drugs to as many as 10,000 athletes from about 1968 to 1988. Cierpinski was implicated by East German track and field research files uncovered by Werner Franke at the Stasi headquarters in Leipzig in the late 1990s.

As a result, 1976 silver medallist Frank Shorter has advocated the belief that Cierpinski cheated and has supported official review of past performances, i.e. considering stripping medals from athletes who are found later on to have cheated, as a deterrent to drug-cheats. Fourth-place finisher Don Kardong has also written that he believed Cierpinski was involved in the East German doping program. Shorter's allegations are very similar to those of Shirley Babashoff, who accused the East German women of drug cheating during the swimming events in the same Olympic Games, which was later substantiated by investigators in the PBS documentary "Secrets of the Dead: Doping for Gold".

Awards
Preceded by (East Germany) Roland Matthes	East German Sportsman of the Year; 1976	Succeeded by (East Germany) Rolf Beilschmidt
Preceded by (East Germany) Bernd Drogan	East German Sportsman of the Year; 1980	Succeeded by (East Germany) Lothar Thoms
Sporting positions
Preceded by (United States) Bill Rodgers	Men's Fastest Marathon Race; 1976	Succeeded by (United States) Bill Rodgers
