= List of marathon national champions (men) =

Below a list of all National champions in the Men's Marathon in track and field from several countries since 1980.

== Argentina ==
- 1980: Alfredo Maravilla
- 1981: Raúl Omar Suárez
- 1982: Alfredo Maravilla
- 1983: Carlos José Orué
- 1984: Rubén Aguiar
- 1985: Carlos José Orué
- 1986: Juan Carlos Ríos
- 1987: Rubén Aguiar
- 1988: Toribio Gutiérrez
- 1989: Toribio Gutiérrez
- 1990: Carlos Edgar Barria
- 1991: Carlos Edgar Barria
- 1992: Toribio Gutiérrez
- 1993: Tranquilino Valenzuela
- 1994: Toribio Gutiérrez
- 1995: Carlos Edgar Barria
- 1996: Juan Pablo Juárez
- 1997: Toribio Gutiérrez
- 1998: Oscar Alarcón
- 1999: Oscar Cortínez
- 2000: Juan Castro
- 2001: Claudio Burgos
- 2002: Alejandro Giménez
- 2003: Daniel Simbrón
- 2004: Daniel Simbrón
- 2005: Oscar Cortínez
- 2006: Oscar Cortínez
- 2007: Oscar Cortínez

== Australia ==
- 1980: Lawrence Whitty
- 1981: Garry Bentley
- 1982: Robert Wallace
- 1983: John Stanley
- 1984: Andrew Lloyd
- 1985: Grenville Wood
- 1986: Stephen Austin
- 1987: Daniel Boltz
- 1988: Patrick Carroll
- 1989: Bradley Camp
- 1990: Allan Carman
- 1991: Sean Quilty
- 1992: Gerard Barrett
- 1993: Sean Quilty
- 1994: Michael Dalton
- 1995: Roderic deHighden
- 1996: Magnus Michelsson
- 1997: Patrick Carroll
- 1998: Greg Lyons
- 1999: Shaun Creighton
- 2000: Roderic deHighden
- 2001: Borislav Devic
- 2002: Jeremy Horne
- 2003: Paul Arthur
- 2004: Daniel Green
- 2005: Brett Cartwright
- 2006: Lee Troop

== Canada ==
- 1980: Brian Maxwell
- 1981: John Hill
- 1982: Michael Dyon
- 1983: Art Boileau
- 1984: Dave Edge
- 1985: Roger Schwegel
- 1986: Agustin Diaz Romero
- 1987: Michael Dyon
- 1988: Gordon Christie
- 1989: Peter Maher
- 1990: Ashley Dustow
- 1991: Michael Petrocci
- 1992-1999: Not Held
- 2000: Bruce Deacon
- 2001: Bruce Deacon
- 2002: Bruce Deacon
- 2003: Not Held
- 2004: Matthew McInnes
- 2005: James Finlayson
- 2006: Charles Bedley
- 2007: Matthew McInnes
- 2008: Giitah Macharia
- 2009: Reid Coolsaet
- 2010: Stephen Drew
- 2011: Lucas McAneney
- 2012: Rejean Chiasson

== England ==
- 1980: Ian Thompson
- 1981: Hugh Jones
- 1982: Steve Kenyon
- 1983: Mike Gratton
- 1984: Charlie Spedding
- 1985: Steve Jones (WAL)
- 1986: Hugh Jones
- 1987: Hugh Jones
- 1988: Kevin Forster
- 1989: Tony Milovsorov
- 1990: Allister Hutton (SCO)
- 1991: Dave Long
- 1992: Paul Evans
- 1993: Eamonn Martin
- 1994: Eamonn Martin
- 1995: Paul Evans
- 1996: Paul Evans
- 1997: Paul Evans
- 1998: Mark Hudspith
- 1999: Mark Hudspith
- 2000: Mark Hudspith
- 2001: Mark Steinle
- 2002: Mark Steinle
- 2003: Christopher Cariss
- 2004: Jonathan Brown
- 2005: Jonathan Brown
- 2006: Peter Riley
- 2007: Dan Robinson

== Denmark ==
- 1980: Jørn Lauenborg
- 1981: Svend-Erik Kristensen
- 1982: Jørn Lauenborg
- 1983: John Skovbjerg
- 1984: Keld Johnsen
- 1985: Christian Wolfsberg
- 1986: Svend-Erik Kristensen
- 1987: Palle Redder Madsen
- 1988: Jens Wørzner
- 1989: Peter Nordsmark
- 1990: Svend-Erik Kristensen
- 1991: Svend-Erik Kristensen
- 1992: Helge Gommesen
- 1993: Niels Kristian Vejen
- 1994: Palle Redder Madsen
- 1995: Kent Jensen
- 1996: Palle Redder Madsen
- 1997: Søren Rasmussen
- 1998: Christian Wolfsberg
- 1999: Torben Juul Nielsen
- 2000: Torben Juul Nielsen
- 2001: Torben Juul Nielsen
- 2002: Torben Juul Nielsen
- 2003: Jørgen Gamborg
- 2004: Torben Juul Nielsen
- 2005: Søren Palshøj
- 2006: Torben Juul Nielsen
- 2007: Søren Palshøj

== Estonia ==
Estonian national champions are as follows.

- 1927: Elmar Reiman
- 1928: Karl Laas
- 1929: Karl Laas
- 1930: Karl Laas
- 1931–1933: –
- 1934: Alfred Maasik
- 1935: Otto Treimann
- 1936: August Koidu
- 1937–1938: –
- 1939: Bernhard Lont
- 1940: Bernhard Lont
- 1941–1946: –
- 1947: Loit Laidna
- 1948: Aleksander Külm
- 1949: Richard Lulla
- 1950: Viktor Puusepp
- 1951: Nikolai Kanajev
- 1952: Arnold Vaabla
- 1953: Viktor Puusepp
- 1954: Viktor Puusepp
- 1955: Viktor Puusepp
- 1956: Viktor Puusepp
- 1957: Viktor Puusepp
- 1958: Arkaadi Birkenfeldt
- 1959: Rein Leinus
- 1960: Rein Leinus
- 1961: Rein Leinus
- 1962: Rein Leinus
- 1963: Rein Leinus
- 1964: Ronald Suur
- 1965: Ronald Suur
- 1966: Ronald Suur
- 1967: Rein Leinus
- 1968: Rein Leinus
- 1969: Rein Leinus
- 1970: Rein Leinus
- 1971: Mart Kalder
- 1972: Jüri Liim
- 1973: Mati Kartau
- 1974: Küllo Tiido
- 1975: Toivo Koovit
- 1976: Küllo Tiido
- 1977: Toivo Koovit
- 1978: Aare Kuum
- 1979: Avo Järv
- 1980: Aare Kuum
- 1981: Rene Meimer
- 1982: Vladimir Heerik
- 1983: Villy Sudemäe
- 1984: Villy Sudemäe
- 1985: Villy Sudemäe
- 1986: Kalev Urbanik
- 1987: Meelis Veilberg
- 1988: Rein Valdmaa
- 1989: Kaupo Sabre
- 1990: Kaupo Sabre
- 1991: Kaupo Sabre
- 1992: Vello Misler
- 1993: Rein Valdmaa
- 1994: Henno Haava
- 1995: Vladimir Arhipov
- 1996: Kaupo Sabre
- 1997: Margus Pirksaar
- 1998: Toomas Tarm
- 1999: Kaupo Sabre
- 2000: Vladimir Bõtšuk
- 2001: Kaupo Sabre
- 2002: Toomas Tarm
- 2003: Toomas Tarm
- 2004: Toomas Tarm
- 2005: Margus Lehtna
- 2006: Taavi Tambur
- 2007: Aleksei Saveljev
- 2008: Aleksei Markov
- 2009: Aleksei Markov
- 2010: Pavel Loskutov
- 2011: Kaupo Sasmin
- 2012: Viljar Vallimäe
- 2013: Roman Fosti
- 2014: Heinar Vaine
- 2015: Sergei Tšerepannikov
- 2016: Heinar Vaine
- 2017: Argo Jõesoo
- 2018: Roman Fosti
- 2019: Raido Mitt
- 2020: Rauno Jallai
- 2021: Dmitri Aristov

== Finland ==
- 1980: Esa Tikkanen
- 1981: Pertti Tiainen
- 1982: Niilo Kemppe
- 1983: Ulf-Hakan Spik
- 1984: Esa Liedes
- 1985: Vesa Kähkölä
- 1986: Jouni Kortelainen
- 1987: Asko Uusimäki
- 1988: Vesa Kähkölä
- 1989: Pekka Vähä-Vahe
- 1990: Illka Väänänen
- 1991: Pekka Vähä-Vahe
- 1992: Yrjö Pesonen
- 1993: Yrjö Pesonen
- 1994: Yrjö Pesonen
- 1995: Jussi Huttunen
- 1996: Jari Jaakkola
- 1997: Ville Hautala
- 1998: Lauri Friari
- 1999: Lauri Friari
- 2000: Yrjö Pesonen
- 2001: Jaakko Kero
- 2002: Yrjö Pesonen
- 2003: Yrjö Pesonen
- 2004: Petri Saavalainen
- 2005: Petri Saavalainen
- 2006: Yrjö Pesonen
- 2007: Marko Vaittinen
- 2008: Anssi Raittila
- 2009: Lewis Korir
- 2010: Obed Kipkurui
- 2011: Jaakko Kero

== France ==
- 1980: Bernard Bobes
- 1981: Dominique Chauvelier
- 1982: Bernard Faure
- 1983: Alain Lazare
- 1984: Patrick Joannes
- 1985: Patrick Joannes
- 1986: Alain Lazare
- 1987: Jean-Jacques Padel
- 1988: Alexandre Rachide
- 1989: Thierry Watrice
- 1990: Dominique Chauvelier
- 1991: Dominique Chauvelier
- 1992: Louis Soares
- 1993: Dominique Chauvelier
- 1994: Philippe Remond
- 1995: Abdi Djama
- 1996: Pascal Fétizon
- 1997: Pascal Blanchard
- 1998: Bertrand Itsweire
- 1999: Abdelhakim Bagy
- 2000: Benoît Zwierzchiewski
- 2001: Philippe Remond
- 2002: Samir Baala
- 2003: Not Held
- 2004: David Antoine
- 2005: David Antoine
- 2006: Pascal Fétizon
- 2007: David Antoine
- 2008: Samir Baala

== Germany ==
=== East Germany ===
- 1980: Martin Schröder
- 1981: Matthias Böckler
- 1982: Waldemar Cierpinski
- 1983: Stephan Seidemann
- 1984: Frank Konzack
- 1985: Jörg Peter
- 1986: Uwe Koch
- 1987: Michael Heilmann
- 1988: Rainer Wachenbrunner
- 1989: Steffen Dittmann
- 1990: Klaus Goldammer

=== West Germany ===
- 1968: Hubert Riesner
- 1969: Hubert Riesner
- 1970: Hans Hellbach
- 1971: Lutz Philipp
- 1972: Lutz Philipp
- 1973: Lutz Philipp
- 1974: Anton Gorbunow
- 1975: Günter Mielke
- 1976: Paul Angenvoorth
- 1977: Günter Mielke
- 1978: Reinhard Leibold
- 1979: Michael Spöttel
- 1980: Ralf Salzmann
- 1981: Ralf Salzmann
- 1982: Ralf Salzmann
- 1983: Ralf Salzmann
- 1984: Ralf Salzmann
- 1985: Herbert Steffny
- 1986: Wolfgang Krüger
- 1987: Guido Dold
- 1988: Udo Reeh
- 1989: Uwe Hartmann
- 1990: Josef Oefele

=== Unified Germany ===
- 1991: Thomas Ertl
- 1992: Thomas Ertl
- 1993: Kurt Stenzel
- 1994: Stephan Freigang
- 1995: Konrad Dobler
- 1996: Steffen Dittmann
- 1997: Dirk Nürnberger
- 1998: Stephan Freigang
- 1999: Carsten Eich
- 2000: Matthias Körner
- 2001: Michael Fietz
- 2002: Martin Beckmann
- 2003: Michael Fietz
- 2004: Stephan Freigang
- 2005: Dirk Nürnberger
- 2006: Matthias Körner
- 2007: Philipp Büttner
- 2008: Martin Beckmann
- 2009: Stefan Koch
- 2010: Dennis Pyka
- 2011: Stefan Koch
- 2012: Jan Simon Hamann
- 2013: Frank Schauer
- 2014: Tobias Schreindl

== Italy ==
- 1908: Umberto Blasi
- 1909: Umberto Blasi (2)
- 1910: Antonio Fraschini
- 1911: Orlando Cesaroni
- 1912: Giovanni Beltrandi
- 1913: Fernando Altimani (4)
- 1914: Angelo Malvicini
- 1915-1918: not held
- 1919: Valerio Arri
- 1920: Florestano Benedetti
- 1921: Florestano Benedetti (2)
- 1922: Angelo Malvicini (2)
- 1923: Ettore Blasi
- 1924: Romeo Bertini
- 1925: Attilio Conton
- 1926: Stefano Natale
- 1927: Luigi Rossini
- 1928: Luigi Prato
- 1929: Stefano Natale (2)
- 1930: Stefano Natale (3)
- 1931: Francesco Roccati
- 1932: Michele Fanelli
- 1933: Aurelio Genghini
- 1934: Michele Fanelli (2)
- 1935: Luigi Rossini (2)
- 1936: Giovanni Balzone
- 1937: Aurelio Genghini (2)
- 1938: Francesco Raccati
- 1939: Francesco Raccati (2)
- 1940: Salvatore Costantino
- 1941: Romano Maffeis
- 1942: Francesco Raccati (3)
- 1943-1944: not held
- 1945: Ettore Padovani
- 1946: Stefano Natale (4)
- 1947: Salvatore Costantino (2)
- 1948: Renato Braghini
- 1949: Cristofano Sestini
- 1950: Gaetano Marzano
- 1951: Asfò Bussotti
- 1952: Egilberto Martufi
- 1953: Antonio Sabelli
- 1954: Antidoro Berti
- 1955: Antidoro Berti (2)
- 1956: Rino Lavelli
- 1957: Rino Lavelli (2)
- 1958: Francesco Perrone
- 1959: Enrico Massante
- 1960: Rino Lavelli
- 1961: Francesco Perrone (2)
- 1962: Antonio Ambu
- 1963: Giorgio Jegmer
- 1964: Antonio Ambu (2)
- 1965: Antonio Ambu (3)
- 1966: Antonio Ambu (4)
- 1967: Antonio Ambu (5)
- 1968: Antonio Ambu (6)
- 1969: Antonio Ambu (7)
- 1970: Toni Ritsch
- 1971: Giovanbattista Bassi
- 1972: Francesco Amante
- 1973: Paolo Accaputo
- 1974: Giuseppe Cindolo
- 1975: Giuseppe Cindolo (2)
- 1976: Giuseppe Cindolo (3)
- 1977: Paolo Accaputo (2)
- 1978: Massimo Magnani
- 1979: Michelangelo Arena
- 1980: Michelangelo Arena (2)
- 1981: Giampaolo Messina
- 1982: Giuseppe Gerbi
- 1983: Giuseppe Gerbi (2)
- 1984: Gianni Poli
- 1985: Osvaldo Faustini
- 1986: Osvaldo Faustini (2)
- 1987: Salvatore Bettiol
- 1988: Carlo Terzer
- 1989: Marco Milani
- 1990: Severino Bernardini
- 1991: Salvatore Bettiol (2)
- 1992: Giacomo Tagliaferri
- 1993: Walter D'Urbano
- 1994: Salvatore Nicosia
- 1995: Danilo Goffi
- 1996: Franco Togni
- 1997: Massimiliano Ingrami
- 1998: Migidio Bourifa
- 1999: Roberto Barbi
- 2000: Roberto Barbi (2)
- 2001: Angelo Carosi
- 2002: Fabio Rinaldi
- 2003: Angelo Carosi (2)
- 2004: Roberto Barbi (3)
- 2005: Vincenzo Modica
- 2006: Ruggero Pertile
- 2007: Migidio Bourifa (2)
- 2008: Alberico Di Cecco
- 2009: Migidio Bourifa (3)
- 2010: Migidio Bourifa (4)
- 2011: Giovanni Gualdi
- 2012: Migidio Bourifa (5)
- 2013: Ruggero Pertile (2)

== Japan ==
- 1980: Hiroshi Yuge
- 1981: Robert de Castella (AUS)
- 1982: Michio Mizukubo
- 1983: Toshihiko Seko
- 1984: Tetsuji Iwase
- 1985: Hisatoshi Shintaku
- 1986: Toshihiro Shibutani
- 1987: Takeyuki Nakayama
- 1988: Toshihiko Seko
- 1989: Manuel Matias (POR)
- 1990: Eddy Hellebuyck (BEL)
- 1991: Shuichi Morita
- 1992: Michael O'Reilly (ENG)
- 1993: Dionicio Cerón (MEX)
- 1994: Kenichi Suzuki
- 1995: Masaki Oya
- 1996: Hiroshi Tako
- 1997: Toshiyuki Hayata
- 1998: Muneyuki Ojima
- 1999: Hiroshi Miki
- 2000: Atsushi Fujita
- 2001: Shigeru Aburaya
- 2002: Toshio Mano
- 2003: Tomoaki Kunichika
- 2004: Tadayuki Ojima
- 2005: Toshinari Takaoka
- 2006: Wataru Okutani
- 2007: Mitsuru Kubota
- 2008: Arata Fujiwara

== Netherlands ==
- 1980: Rudi Verriet
- 1981: Cor Vriend
- 1982: Cor Vriend
- 1983: Cor Vriend
- 1984: Gerard Nijboer
- 1985: Cor Vriend
- 1986: Adri Hartveld
- 1987: Marti ten Kate
- 1988: Gerard Nijboer
- 1989: Huub Pragt
- 1990: Jan van Rijthoven
- 1991: Bert van Vlaanderen
- 1992: Bert van Vlaanderen
- 1993: Bert van Vlaanderen
- 1994: Aart Stigter
- 1995: Bert van Vlaanderen
- 1996: Aiduna Aitnafa
- 1997: Luc Krotwaar
- 1998: Luc Krotwaar
- 1999: Luc Krotwaar
- 2000: Luc Krotwaar
- 2001: Peter van Egdom
- 2002: Luc Krotwaar
- 2003: Kamiel Maase
- 2004: Luc Krotwaar
- 2005: Kamiel Maase
- 2006: Kamiel Maase
- 2007: Luc Krotwaar
- 2008: Greg van Hest
- 2009: Koen Raymaekers
- 2010: Koen Raymaekers
- 2011: Michel Butter
- 2012: Patrick Stitzinger
- 2013: Patrick Stitzinger
- 2014: Paul Zwama
- 2015: Abdi Nageeye
- 2016: Khalid Choukoud

== New Zealand ==
- 1980: Don Greig
- 1981: Paul Ballinger
- 1982: Trevor Wright
- 1983: Graham Macky
- 1984: Barry Thompson
- 1985: John Campbell
- 1986: John Campbell
- 1987: Peter Renner
- 1988: Paul Ballinger
- 1989: Paul Ballinger
- 1990: Tom Birnie
- 1991: Paul Herlihy
- 1992: Mark Hutchinson
- 1993: Paul Herlihy
- 1994: Paul Smith
- 1995: Chris Mardon
- 1996: Phil Costley
- 1997: Peter Buske
- 1998: Mark Hutchinson
- 1999: Phil Costley
- 2000: Mark Hutchinson
- 2001: Alastair Snowdon
- 2002: Mark Bright
- 2003: Todd Stevens
- 2004: Dale Warrander
- 2005: Matt Dravitski
- 2006: Dale Warrander
- 2007: Stafford Thompson
- 2008: Joe Piggin
- 2009: Matt Dravitzki
- 2010: Dale Warrander
- 2011: Dale Warrander
- 2012: Tony Payne
- 2013: Dougal Thorburn
- 2014: Masataka Uchino (JPN)
- 2015: Aaron Pulford
- 2016: Nick Horspool
- 2017: Dan Lowry (USA)
- 2018: Blair McWhirter
- 2019: Oska Inkster-Baynes
- 2020: not held
- 2021: Daniel Jones
- 2022: Daniel Balchin
- 2023: Daniel Balchin

== Poland ==
- 1970: Zdzisław Bogusz
- 1971: Edward Stawiarz
- 1972: Edward Stawiarz
- 1973: Edward Stawiarz
- 1974: Edward Łęgowski
- 1975: Edward Łęgowski
- 1976: Kazimierz Orzeł
- 1977: Kazimierz Orzeł
- 1978: Ryszard Marczak
- 1979: Zbigniew Pierzynka
- 1980: Zbigniew Pierzynka
- 1981: Ryszard Marczak
- 1982: Ryszard Kopijasz
- 1983: Jerzy Kowol
- 1984: Wojciech Ratkowski
- 1985: Ryszard Misiewicz
- 1986: Antoni Niemczak
- 1987: Bogumił Kuś
- 1988: Wiktor Sawicki
- 1989: Marek Deputat
- 1990: Józef Kazanecki
- 1991: Tadeusz Ławicki
- 1992: Tadeusz Ławicki
- 1993: Tadeusz Ławicki
- 1994: Janusz Wójcik
- 1995: Wiesław Pałczyński
- 1996: Mirosław Plawgo
- 1997: Adam Szanowicz
- 1998: Wiesław Perszke
- 1999: Piotr Pobłocki
- 2000: Mirosław Plawgo
- 2001: Mirosław Plawgo
- 2002: Jan Białk
- 2003: Waldemar Glinka
- 2004: Waldemar Glinka
- 2005: Rafał Wójcik
- 2006: Rafał Wójcik
- 2007: Paweł Ochal
- 2008: Henryk Szost
- 2009: Radosław Dudycz
- 2010: Radosław Dudycz
- 2011: Błażej Brzeziński
- 2012: Yared Shegumo
- 2013: Arkadiusz Gardzielewski
- 2014: Henryk Szost
- 2015: Henryk Szost
- 2016: Artur Kozłowski

== Portugal ==
- 1980: Armando Aldegalega
- 1981: Delfim Moreira
- 1982: Renato Graça
- 1983: Cidálio Caetano
- 1984: Manuel Oliveira
- 1985: Artur Borba Oliveira
- 1986: Telmo Fernandes
- 1987: João A. Campos
- 1988: Telmo Fernandes
- 1989: António Costa
- 1990: António Godinho
- 1991: Mário Sousa
- 1992: Gilberto Fernandes
- 1993: Domingos Neves
- 1994: Galhardo Pires
- 1995: João Lopes
- 1996: Manuel Pita
- 1997: Domingos Neves
- 1998: Alcídio Costa
- 1999: Eusébio Costa
- 2000: António Sousa
- 2001: Carlos Valente
- 2002: Vítor Cordeiro
- 2003: Luís Jesus
- 2004: Eusébio Rosa
- 2005: João Marques
- 2006: Luís Jesus
- 2007: José Oliveira
- 2008: Rui Coimbra
- 2009: Vasco Azevedo
- 2010: -
- 2011: Vasco Azevedo

== Russia ==
- 1992: Ruslan Yamayev
- 1993: Andrey Tarasov
- 1994: Anatoliy Archakov
- 1995: Vladimir Plykin
- 1996: Aleksandr Gurin
- 1997: Vladimir Epanov
- 1998: Andrey Shalagin
- 1999: Oleg Strizhakov
- 2000: Aleksey Korobov
- 2001: Mikhail Romanov
- 2002: Yuriy Chizhov
- 2003: Aleksey Sokolov
- 2004: Dmitriy Burmakin
- 2005: Aleksey Sokolov
- 2006: Andrey Chernyshov
- 2007: Aleksey Sokolov

== Spain ==
Spanish national champions are as follows.

- 1980: Eleuterio Antón
- 1981: Eleuterio Antón
- 1982: Santiago de la Parte
- 1983: Juan Carlos Traspaderne
- 1984: Eleuterio Antón
- 1985: Alfonso Abellán
- 1986: Santiago de la Parte
- 1987: Vicente Anton
- 1988: Alfonso Abellan
- 1989: Emiliano García
- 1990: Vicente Anton
- 1991: Jesus de Grado
- 1992: Rodrigo Gavela
- 1993: Ricardo Jose Castaño
- 1994: Jose Apalanza
- 1995: Ricardo Jose Castaño
- 1996: Rodrigo Gavela
- 1997: Antoni Peña
- 1998: Juan Antonio Ruiz
- 1999: José María Gonzales
- 2000: Benito Ojeda
- 2001: Benito Ojeda
- 2002-2004: Not Held
- 2005: Roger Roca
- 2006: Javier Díaz
- 2007: Oskar Martin
- 2008: Asier Cuevas
- 2009: Rafael Iglesias
- 2010: Miguel Angel Gamonal
- 2011: Pablo Villalobos
- 2012: Carles Castillejo
- 2013: Javi Guerra
- 2014: Carles Castillejo
- 2015: Pedro Nimo
- 2016: Carles Castillejo
- 2017: Pablo Villalobos
- 2018: Javi Guerra

== Ukraine ==
- 1992: ???
- 1993: ???
- 1994: Pavlo Vasylenko
- 1995: ???
- 1996: ???
- 1997: ???
- 1998: ???
- 1999: ???
- 2000: ???
- 2001: ???
- 2002: ???
- 2003: Oleksandr Holovnytskyi
- 2004: Serhiy Kryzhko
- 2005: Viktor Rogovyi
- 2006: Andriy Goliney
- 2007: ???
- 2008: Oleksiy Rybalchenko
- 2009: Oleksiy Rybalchenko
- 2010: Vasyl Remshchuk
- 2011: Oleksandr Sitkovskyy
- 2012: Ihor Olefirenko
- 2013: Ihor Olefirenko
- 2014: Roman Romanenko
- 2015: Ihor Olefirenko
- 2016: Serhiy Marchuk
- 2017: Artem Piddubnyi
- 2018: Mykola Yukhymchuk
- 2019: Bohdan-Ivan Horodyskyi
- 2020: not held

== United States ==
- 1980: Frank Richardson
- 1981: Robert Johnson
- 1982: Joel Menges
- 1983: Peter Pfitzinger
- 1984: Ken Martin
- 1985: Ken Martin
- 1986: William Donakowski
- 1987: Ric Sayre
- 1988: Mark Conover
- 1989: Bill Reifsnyder
- 1990: Steve Spence
- 1991: Bill Reifsnyder
- 1992: Steve Spence
- 1993: Ed Eyestone
- 1994: Paul Pilkington
- 1995: Keith Brantly
- 1996: Bob Kempainen
- 1997: Dave Scudamore
- 1998: Keith Brantly
- 1999: Alfredo Vigueras
- 2000: Rod DeHaven
- 2001: Scott Larson
- 2002: Dan Browne
- 2003: Ryan Shay
- 2004: Alan Culpepper
- 2005: Mbarak Hussein
- 2006: Mbarak Hussein
- 2007: Ryan Hall
- 2008: Fernando Cabada
- 2009: Meb Keflezighi
- 2010: Sergio Reyes

== External sources ==
- Athletics Canada
- GBRathletics
- ARRS site
- Australian Championships
