= Cinque Mulini =

Annual cross country running race in San Vittore Olona, Italy

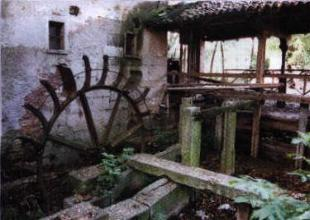
- The Montoli mill, one of several near the course.
- Date: Late January or Early February
- Location: San Vittore Olona, Italy
- Event type: Cross country
- Distance: 8.2 km for men 6.2 km for women
- Established: 1933
- Website: Cinque Mulini
- Participants: 100 finishers (2022); 88 (2021); 109 (2020); 74 (2019)

The Cinque Mulini is an annual cross country running race in San Vittore Olona, Italy. First held in 1933, the course is unusual in that it revolves around a number of water mills along Olona river, which lend the competition its name – meaning Five Mills in Italian. It is one of the IAAF cross country permit meetings that act as qualifiers for the IAAF World Cross Country Championships. As one of the most prestigious meets, numerous world record holders and Olympic champions have competed at the Cinque Mulini throughout its history.

== History ==
Giovanni Malerba organised the first competition in 1933 as a reaction to a competition in a neighbouring village which revolved around seven clock towers. The competition has been held every year since its inception, including throughout the Second World War and in 1939 when the Federazione Italiana di Atletica Leggera (FIDAL) ordered that all cross country competitions be postponed. The course was altered from 10 km to 12 in the late 1930s, in order to accommodate all five mills. The race began to grow after being selected as the course for the Italian Cross Country Championship in 1946 and 1949. The competition became an international one in 1952 and Tunisian runner Ahmed Labidi became the first foreign winner two years later. By the early 1960s, Olympic silver medallist Franjo Mihalić had brought the race to new heights, taking three victories over five editions.

A junior race was introduced in 1960, the first international women's race was held in 1971, and student races were added to the program in the late 1970s. Olympic and World champions graced the course at every edition in the 1970s. By the mid-eighties, East African runners had established themselves, frequently reaching the podium in the senior races. It was part of the IAAF World Cross Challenge the following decade, remaining at the forefront of European cross country running. The course was significantly changed throughout the 2000s, only the Cozzi and Meraviglia mills remained as part of the course and gradually only the semi-functioning Meraviglia was included.

Both former champion David Bedford and meet organiser Vito Garofalo stressed that the competition's longevity is due to, in part, the support the race receives from the local community. The race was elected to serve as the Italian national cross country championships in 1996; Gennaro Di Napoli and Patrizia Di Napoli took the honours.

The event hosted the European Cross Country Club Championships alongside the traditional race in 2011; Portuguese club Grupo Desportivo e Recreativo Conforlimpa won the men's team title while the women's title went to Turkey's Üsküdar Belediyesi Spor Kulübü.

== Past senior race winners ==
=== National era ===
Edition	Year	Men's winner	Time (m:s)	Women's winner	Time (m:s)
1st	1933	Mario Fiocchi (ITA)		Not held	—
2nd	1934	Luigi Pellin (ITA)		Not held	—
3rd	1935	Luigi Pellin (ITA)		Not held	—
4th	1936	Luigi Pellin (ITA)		Not held	—
5th	1937	Romano Maffeis (ITA)		Not held	—
6th	1938	Umberto de Florentis (ITA)		Not held	—
7th	1939	Vittorio Avila (ITA)		Not held	—
8th	1940	Antonio Vitali (ITA)		Not held	—
9th	1941	Romano Maffeis (ITA)		Not held	—
10th	1942	Salvatore Costantino (ITA)		Not held	—
11th	1943	Salvatore Costantino (ITA)		Not held	—
12th	1944	Giuseppe Beviacqua (ITA)		Not held	—
13th	1945	Armando Cesarato (ITA)		Not held	—
14th	1946	Aldo Rossi (ITA)		Not held	—
15th	1947	Sestini Cristoforo (ITA)		Not held	—
16th	1948	Giuseppe Italia (ITA)		Not held	—
17th	1949	Giuseppe Beviacqua (ITA)		Not held	—
18th	1950	Giuseppe Italia (ITA)		Not held	—
19th	1951	Luigi Pelliccioli (ITA)		Not held	—

=== International era ===
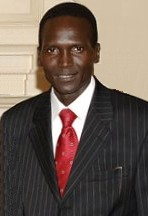
Paul Tergat took the title in 1996 and 1998.

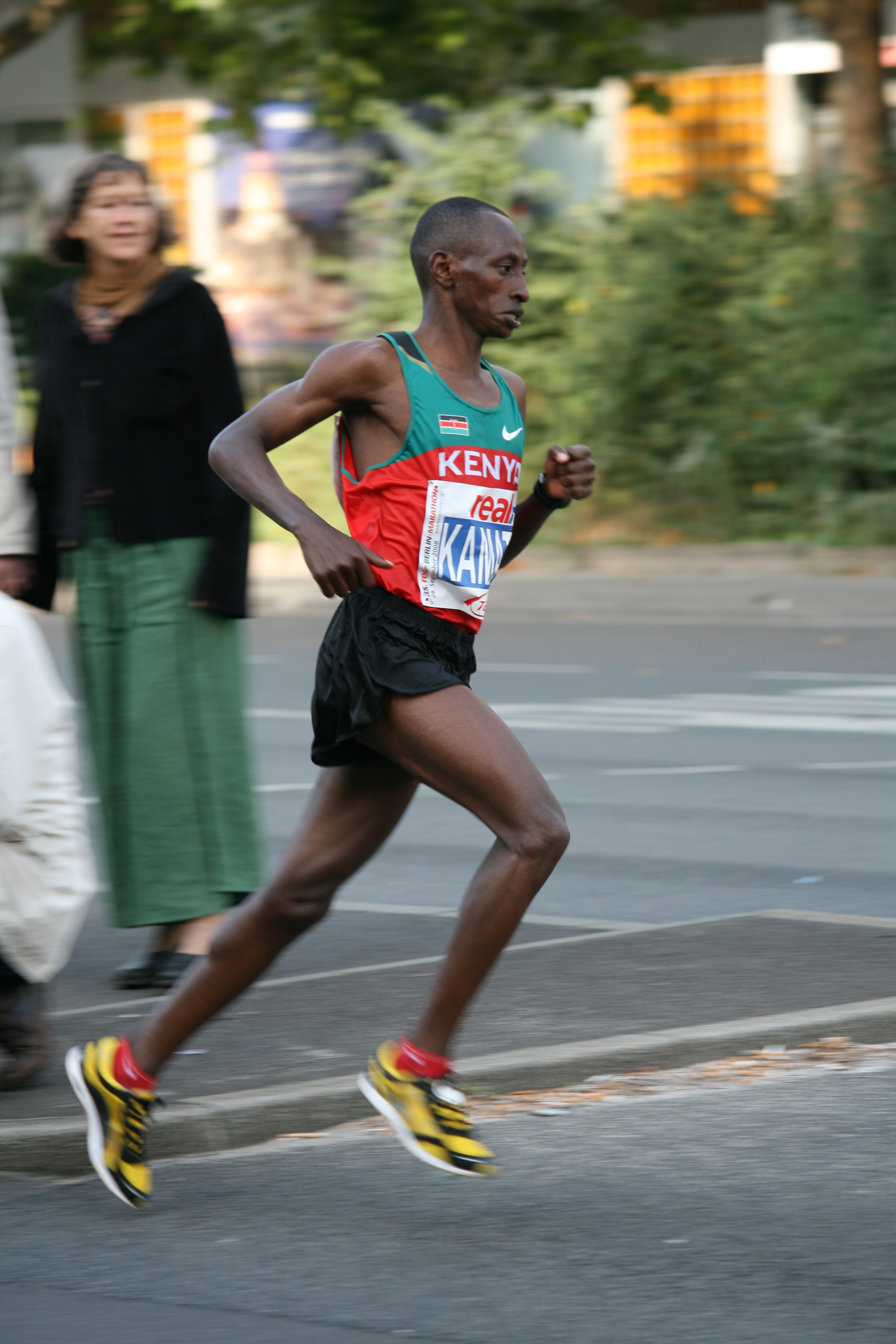
Charles Kamathi won consecutively in 2000 and 2001.

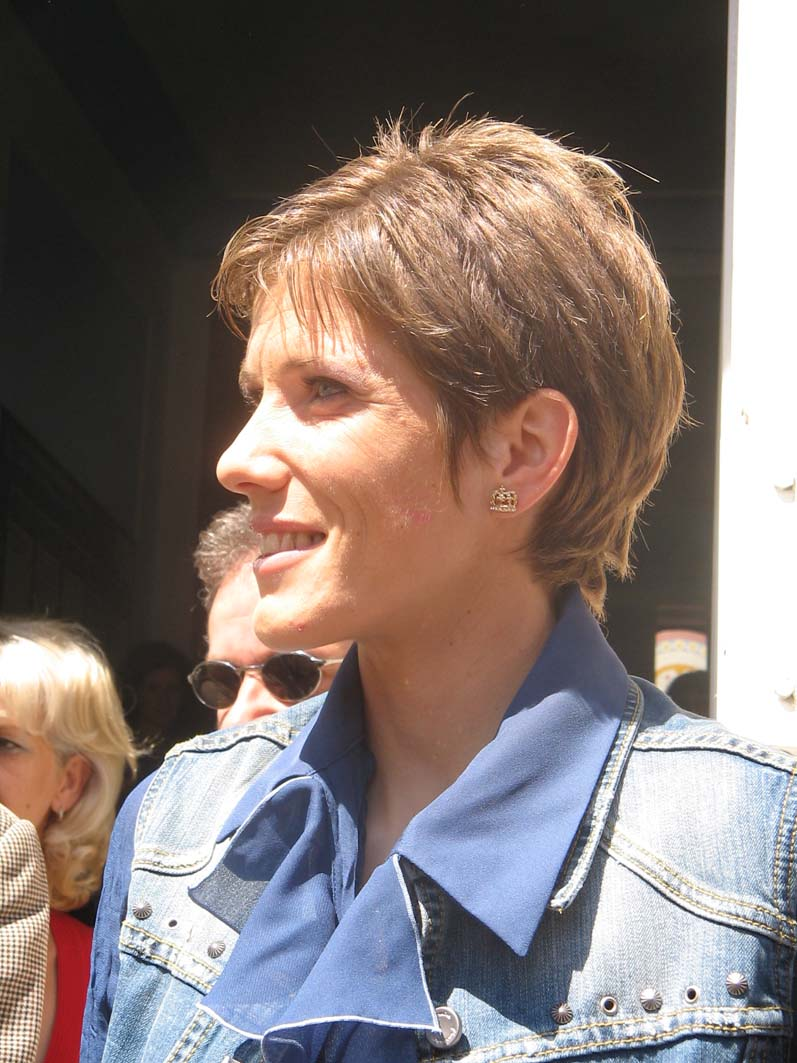
Olivera Jevtić was the 2001 and 2002 women's champion.

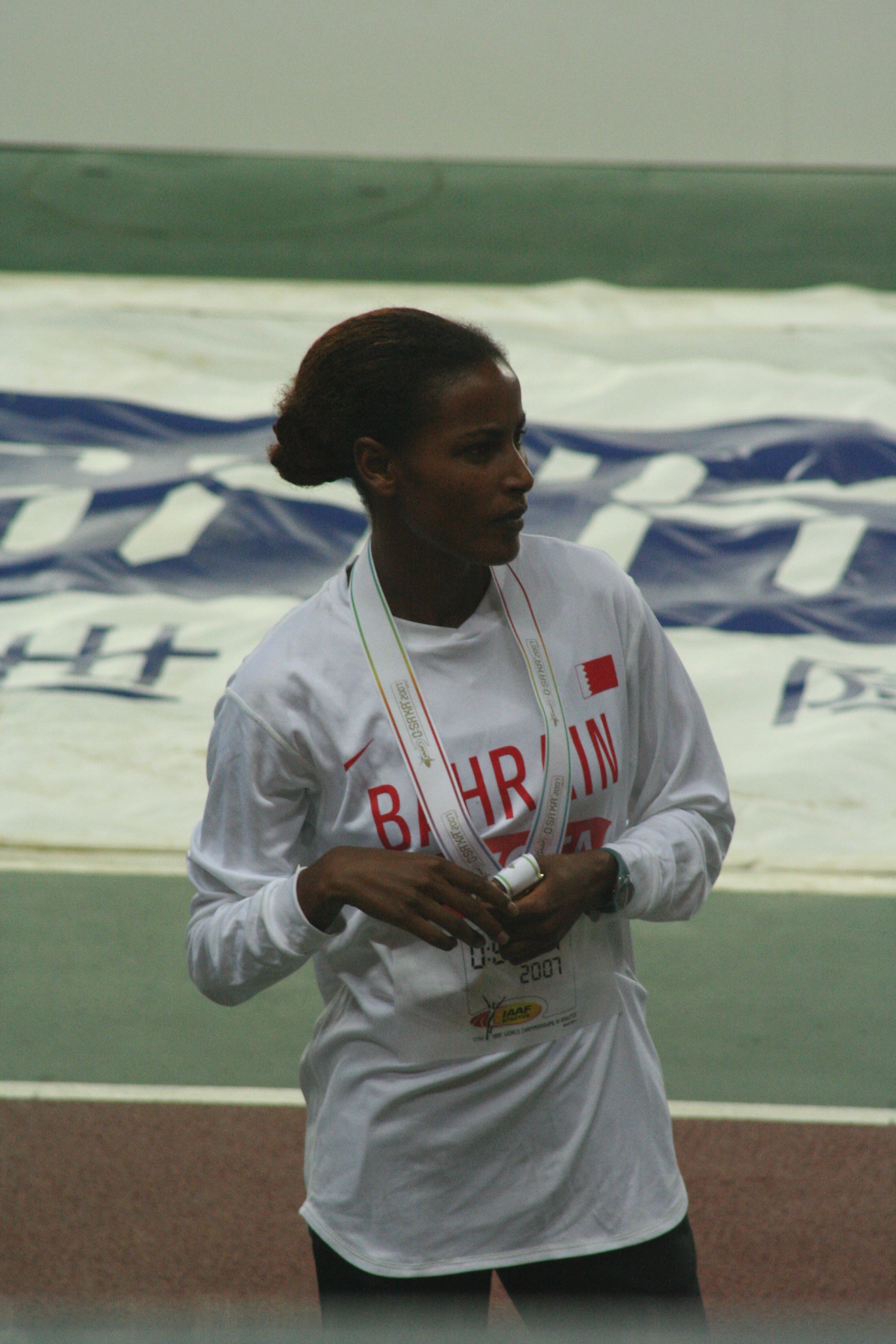
Maryam Yusuf Jamal won the 2007 women's race.

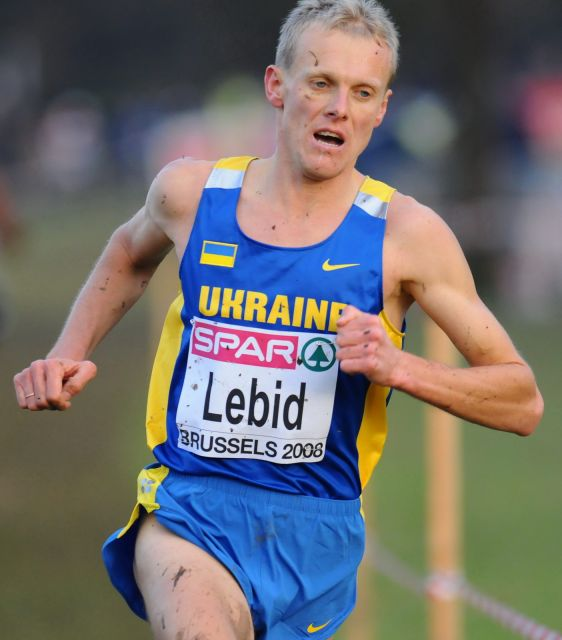
The 2003 and 2007 winner, Serhiy Lebid, was also European Champion both years.

Edition	Year	Men's winner	Time (m:s)	Women's winner	Time (m:s)
20th	1952	Luigi Pelliccioli (ITA)		Not held	—
21st	1953	Agostino Conti (ITA)		Not held	—
22nd	1954	Ahmed Labidi (TUN)		Not held	—
23rd	1955	Giacomo Pepicelli (ITA)		Not held	—
24th	1956	Rino Lavelli (ITA)		Not held	—
25th	1957	Franjo Mihalić (YUG)		Not held	—
26th	1958	Franjo Mihalić (YUG)		Not held	—
27th	1959	Francesco Perrone (ITA)		Not held	—
28th	1960	Gianfranco Baraldi (ITA)		Not held	—
29th	1961	Franjo Mihalić (YUG)		Not held	—
30th	1962	Michel Jazy (FRA)		Not held	—
31st	1963	Michel Jazy (FRA)		Not held	—
32nd	1964	Antonio Ambu (ITA)		Not held	—
33rd	1965	Billy Mills (USA)		Not held	—
34th	1966	Mike Turner (GBR)		Not held	—
35th	1967	Nikolai Dutov (URS)		Not held	—
36th	1968	Gaston Roelants (BEL)		Not held	—
37th	1969	Kipchoge Keino (KEN)		Not held	—
38th	1970	Naftali Temu (KEN)		Not held	—
39th	1971	Dane Korica (YUG)		Rita Ridley (GBR)	
40th	1972	David Bedford (GBR)		Rita Ridley (GBR)	
41st	1973	Frank Shorter (USA)		Paola Pigni (ITA)	
42nd	1974	Emiel Puttemans (BEL)		Rita Ridley (GBR)	
43rd	1975	Filbert Bayi (TAN)		Gabriella Dorio (ITA)	
44th	1976	Filbert Bayi (TAN)		Renata Pentlinowska (POL)	
45th	1977	Yohannes Mohamed (ETH)		Bronisława Ludwichowska (POL)	
46th	1978	Willy Polleunis (BEL)		Grete Waitz (NOR)	
47th	1979	Léon Schots (BEL)		Grete Waitz (NOR)	
46th	1980	Léon Schots (BEL)		Grete Waitz (NOR)	
49th	1981	Mohamed Kedir (ETH)		Grete Waitz (NOR)	
50th	1982	Eshetu Tura (ETH)		Grete Waitz (NOR)	
51st	1983	Robert de Castella (AUS)		Margaret Groos (USA)	
52nd	1984	Bekele Debele (ETH)		Grete Waitz (NOR)	
53rd	1985	Fesseha Abebe (ETH)		Betty Springs (USA)	
54th	1986	Alberto Cova (ITA)		Lynn Jennings (USA)	
55th	1987	Paul Kipkoech (KEN)		Lynn Jennings (USA)	
56th	1988	Paul Kipkoech (KEN)		Annette Sergent (FRA)	
57th	1989	John Ngugi (KEN)		Jacqueline Perkins (AUS)	
58th	1990	Moses Tanui (KEN)		Nadia Dandolo (ITA)	
59th	1991	Khalid Skah (MAR)		Luchia Yishak (ETH)	
60th	1992	Fita Bayisa (ETH)		Luchia Yishak (ETH)	
61st	1993	Fita Bayisa (ETH)		Esther Kiplagat (KEN)	
62nd	1994	Fita Bayisa (ETH)		Albertina Dias (POR)	
63rd	1995	Fita Bayisa (ETH)		Albertina Dias (POR)	
64th	1996	Paul Tergat (KEN)		Merima Denboba (ETH)	
65th	1997	Girma Tolla (ETH)		Gete Wami (ETH)	
66th	1998	Paul Tergat (KEN)		Merima Denboba (ETH)	
67th	1999	Salah Hissou (MAR)		Anita Weyermann (SUI)	
68th	2000	Charles Kamathi (KEN)		Asmae Leghzaoui (MAR)	
69th	2001	Charles Kamathi (KEN)		Olivera Jevtić (FRY)	
70th	2002	Kenenisa Bekele (ETH)		Olivera Jevtić (FRY)	
71st	2003	Serhiy Lebid (UKR)		Alice Timbilil (KEN)	
72nd	2004	Boniface Kiprop (UGA)		Zakia Mrisho (TAN)	
73rd	2005	Saif Shaheen (QAT)		Benita Johnson (AUS)	
74th	2006	Paul Koech (KEN)		Anikó Kálovics (HUN)	
75th	2007	Serhiy Lebid (UKR)		Maryam Jamal (BHR)	
76th	2008	Zersenay Tadese (ERI)		Pauline Korikwiang (KEN)	
77th	2009	Saif Shaheen (QAT)		Anikó Kálovics (HUN)	
78th	2010	Hunegnaw Mesfin (ETH)	28:03	Nancy Langat (KEN)	19:25
79th	2011	Ayad Lamdassem (ESP)	28:03	Alemitu Degfa (TUR)	20:28
80th	2012	Thomas Longosiwa (KEN)	30:04	Priscah Cheronno (KEN)	21:32
81st	2013	Muktar Edris (ETH)	30:08	Afera Godfay (ETH)	21:56
82nd	2014	Paul Tanui (KEN)	29:59	Faith Kipyegon (KEN)	20:54
83rd	2015	Muktar Edris (ETH)	33:50	Violet Jelagat (KEN)	24:40
84th	2016	Jairus Birech (KEN)	34:38	Faith Kipyegon (KEN)	18:15
85th	2017	Selemon Barega (ETH)	33:43	Beyenu Degefa (ETH)	18:23
86th	2018	Jacob Kiplimo (UGA)	34:00	Letesenbet Gidey (ETH)	18:14
87th	2019	Jairus Birech (KEN)	33:05	Winfred Yavi (BHR)	17:50
88th	2020	Leonard Bett (KEN)	32:08	Winfred Yavi (BHR)	17:22
89th	2021	Nibret Melak (ETH)	28:57	Tsehay Gemechu (ETH)	18:53
90th	2022	Nibret Melak (ETH)	28:33	Teresia Muthoni (KEN)	19:40
91st	2023	Gideon Rono (KEN)	29:00	Beatrice Chebet (KEN)	19:41
92nd	17 Nov 2024	Matthew Kipruto (KEN)	27:26	Yenenesh Shimeket (ETH)	18:35
93rd	23 Nov 2025	Saymon Amanuel (ERI)	22:48	Yenenesh Shimeket (ETH)	19:11

== Statistics ==
=== Winners by country ===
Country	Men's race	Women's race	Total
Italy	27	3	30
Ethiopia	17	10	27
Kenya	16	9	25
United States	2	4	6
Belgium	5	0	5
Yugoslavia	4	0	4
United Kingdom	1	3	4
Australia	1	2	3
Bahrain	0	3	3
France	2	1	3
Morocco	2	1	3
Tanzania	2	1	3
Eritrea	2	0	2
FR Yugoslavia	0	2	2
Hungary	0	2	2
Poland	0	2	2
Portugal	0	2	2
Qatar	2	0	2
Uganda	2	0	2
Ukraine	2	0	2
Soviet Union	1	0	1
Spain	1	0	1
Switzerland	0	1	1
Tunisia	1	0	1
Turkey	0	1	1

=== Multiple winners ===
Men
Athlete	Country	Wins	Years
Luigi Pellin	Italy	3	1934, 1935, 1936
Romano Maffeis	Italy	2	1937, 1940
Salvatore Constantino	Italy	2	1942, 1943
Giuseppe Beviacqua	Italy	2	1944, 1949
Giuseppe Italia	Italy	2	1948, 1950
Luigi Pelliccioli	Italy	2	1951, 1952
Franjo Mihalić	Yugoslavia	3	1957, 1958, 1961
Michel Jazy	France	2	1972, 1973
Filbert Bayi	Tanzania	2	1975, 1976
Leon Schots	Belgium	2	1979, 1980
Paul Kipkoech	Kenya	2	1987, 1988
Fita Bayisa	Ethiopia	4	1992, 1993, 1994, 1995
Paul Tergat	Kenya	2	1996, 1998
Charles Kamathi	Kenya	2	2000, 2001
Serhiy Lebid	Ukraine	2	2003, 2007
Saif Saaeed Shaheen	Qatar	2	2005, 2009
Muktar Edris	Ethiopia	2	2013, 2015

Women
Athlete	Country	Wins	Years
Rita Ridley	United Kingdom	3	1971, 1972, 1974
Grete Waitz Anderson	Norway	6	1978, 1979, 1980, 1981, 1982, 1984
Lynn Jennings	United States	2	1986, 1987
Luchia Yishak	Ethiopia	2	1991, 1992
Albertina Dias	Portugal	2	1994, 1995
Merima Denboba	Ethiopia	2	1996, 1998
Olivera Jevtić	FR Yugoslavia	2	2001, 2002
Anikó Kálovics	Hungary	2	2002, 2006
Faith Kipyegon	Kenya	2	2014, 2016

- Last updated January 2016

== See also ==
- Campaccio
- European Cross Country Championships
- Trofeo Alasport
