= Masters W55 10000 metres world record progression =

This is the progression of world record improvements of the 10000 metres W55 division of Masters athletics.

Key

Incomplete information Pending

Hand	Auto	Athlete	Nationality	Birthdate	Age	Location	Date	Ref
	36:38.32	Michelle Rohl	United States	12 November 1965	59 years, 214 days	Portland	14 June 2025	
	36:46.96	Sally Gibbs	New Zealand	5 June 1963	56 years, 159 days	Wellington	11 November 2019	
	36:53.81	Silke Schmidt	Germany	7 August 1959	55 years, 268 days	Ohrdruf	2 May 2015	
	37:09.27	Sandra Branney	Great Britain	30 April 1954	55 years, 3 days	Bedford	3 May 2009	
	37:22.37	Bernardine Portenski	New Zealand	26 August 1949	56 years, 233 days	Wellington	16 April 2006	
	37:47.95	Edeltraud Pohl	Germany	14 July 1936	55 years, 297 days	Menden	6 May 1992	
38:38.6 h		Jean Albury	Australia	28 September 1929	55 years, 189 days	Hobart	5 April 1985	
