= Copenhagen Marathon =

Danish marathon

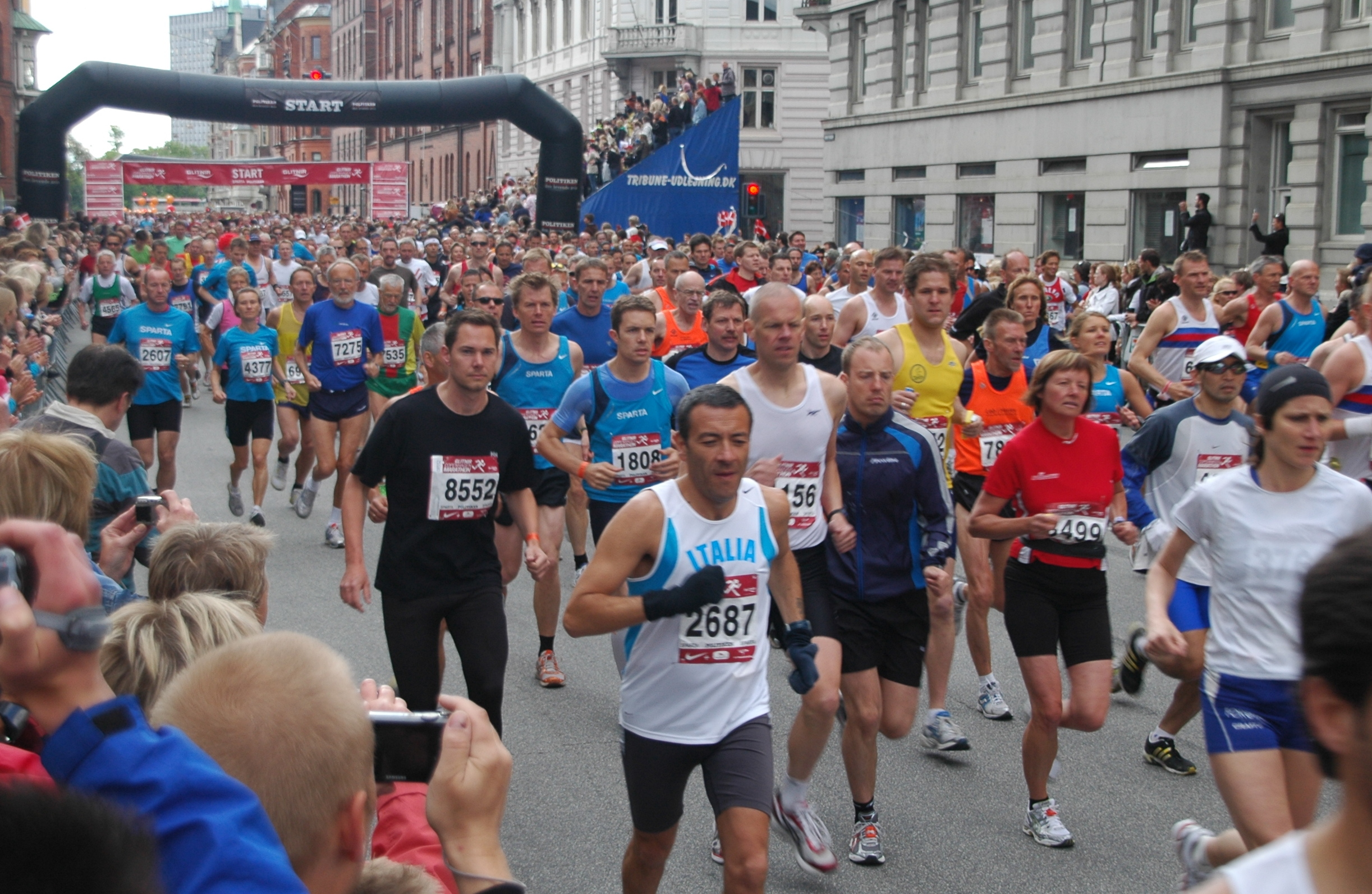
- The start of the mass race in 2008
- Date: May
- Location: Copenhagen, Denmark
- Event type: Road
- Distance: Marathon
- Established: 1980
- Course records: Men's: 2:08:23 (2022) (Eritrea) Birhane Tsegay; Women's: 2:22:08 (2026) (Kenya) Mercy Chebwogen
- Website: Copenhagen Marathon
- Participants: 18557 (2025)

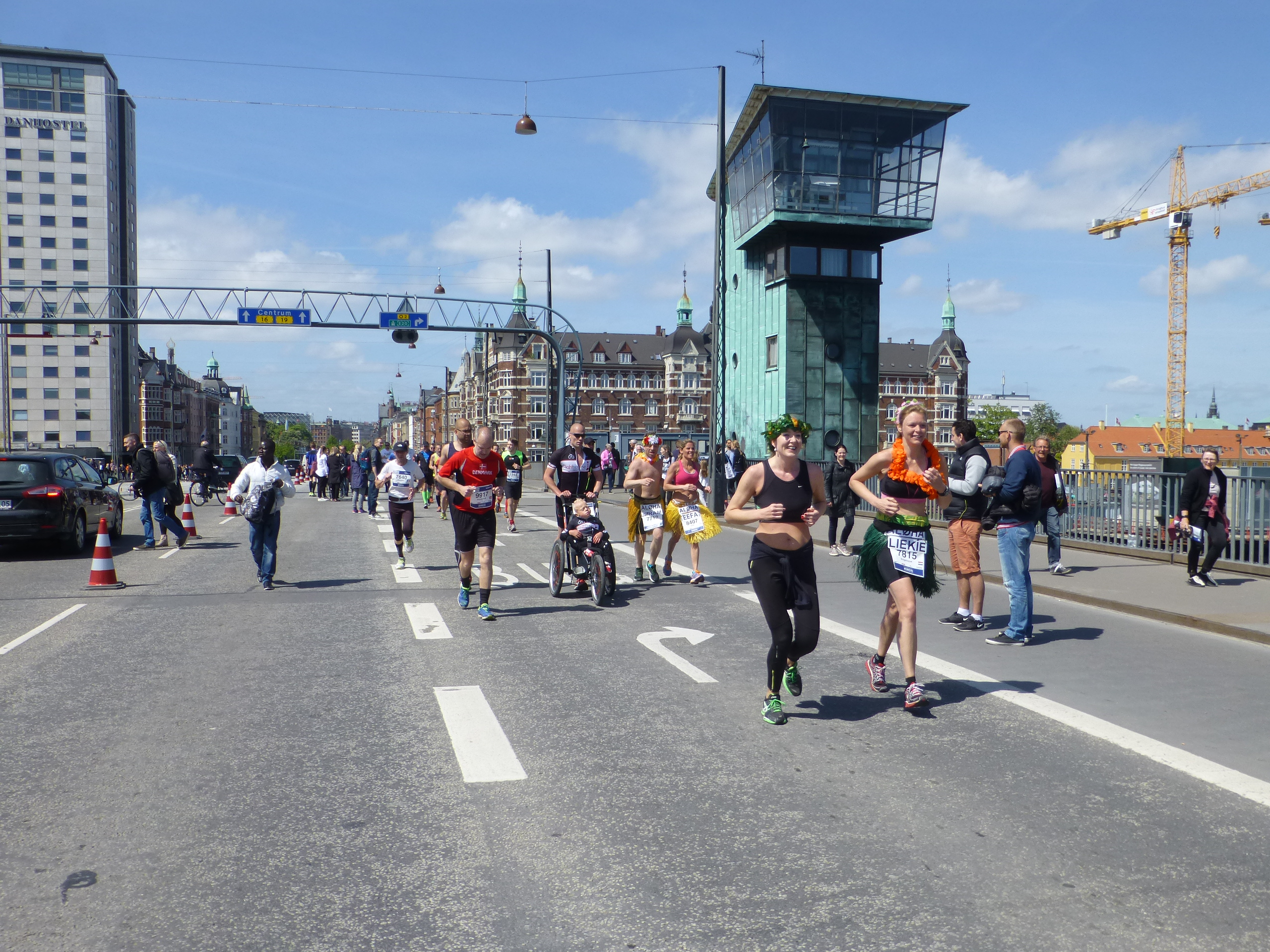
Runners on Langebro about to complete the last kilometre in 2015

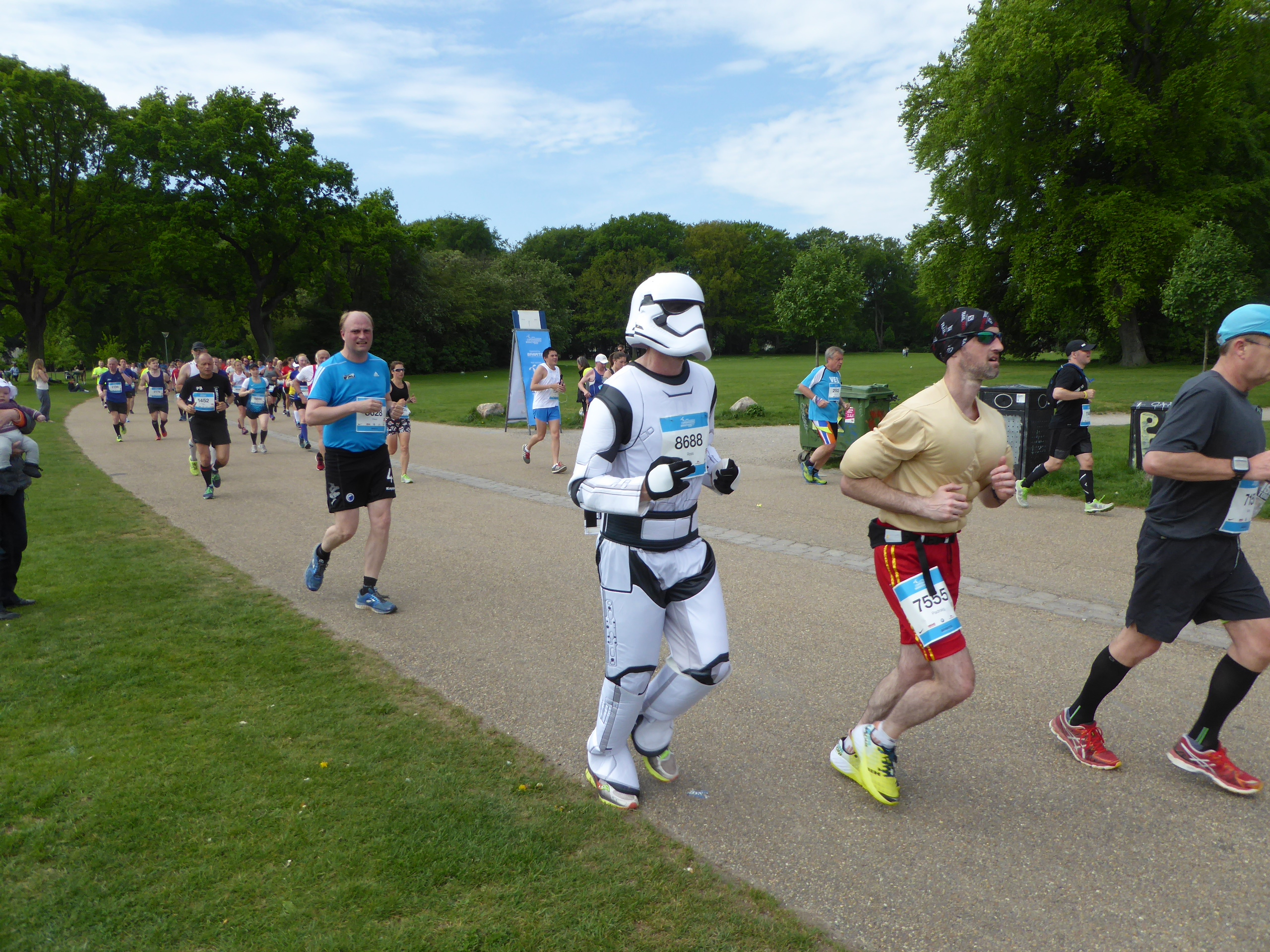
Running in costume in 2016

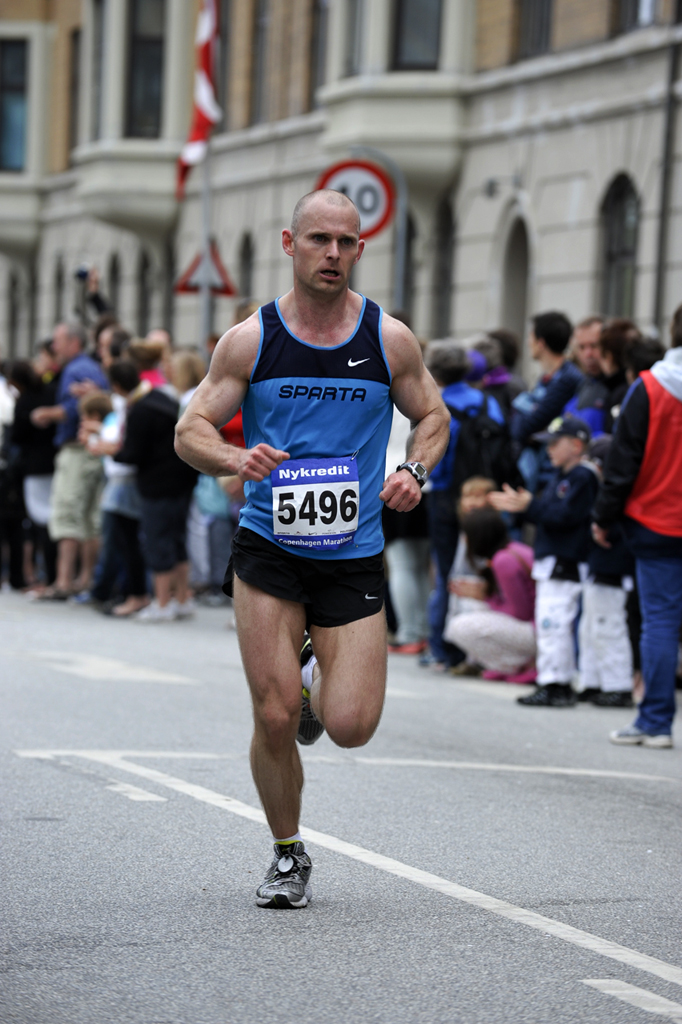
Danish runner Kian Zanno Ejlertsen at the race in 2010

The Copenhagen Marathon is an annual marathon that takes place on the streets of Copenhagen, Denmark. Established on the 24th of May 1980, it is annually held in May and has around 23,000 participants. It is a World Athletics Bronze Label race.

The mostly flat loop course begins and ends at the harbourfront of Islands Brygge and passes through the municipalities of Copenhagen and Frederiksberg. There is a time limit of six hours.

The 2020 and 2021 editions of the race were cancelled due to the coronavirus pandemic, with all paying registrants having the option to transfer their entry to the next edition of the race, or to obtain a full refund.

== Winners ==
Key: Course record

Ed.	Year	Male	Time	Female	Time
1	1980	Arne Stigsen (DEN)	2:19:27	Lone Dybdal (DEN)	2:58:09
2	1981	Ove Larsen (DEN)	2:24:10	Jytte Fruchtmann (USA)	3:16:26
3	1982	Henrik Jørgensen (DEN)	2:22:19	Vibeke Nielsen (DEN)	3:00:06
4	1983	Henrik Jørgensen (DEN)	2:16:41	Lone Dybdal (DEN)	2:45:10
5	1984	Philippe Adams (BEL)	2:22:18	Britta Houmann (DEN)	2:51:37
6	1985	Ole Jacobsen (DEN)	2:22:18	Lone Dybdal (DEN)	2:45:07
7	1986	Svend Erik Kristensen (DEN)	2:15:04	Joan Carstensen (DEN)	2:48:31
8	1987	Svend Erik Kristensen (DEN)	2:14:16	Mette Wertd (DEN)	2:49:22
9	1988	Allan Zachariasen (DEN)	2:21:19	Kersti Jacobsen (DEN)	3:01:00
10	1989	Beat Imhof (SUI)	2:29:22	Lisbeth Sejrsbøl (DEN)	3:08:34
11	1990	Alexander Schatz (DEN)	2:23:17	Anette Hansen (DEN)	2:51:42
12	1991	Stanislaw Cembrzynski (POL)	2:21:59	Mariann Stenbakk (NOR)	2:53:00
13	1992	Alexander Kouftyrev (RUS)	2:24:07	Tatiana Pentoukova (RUS)	2:47:21
14	1993	Stanislaw Cembrzynski (POL)	2:22:58	Tatiana Forminykh (RUS)	2:54:12
15	1994	Joel Kipchumba (KEN)	2:20:20	Svetlana Kazankina (RUS)	2:50:53
16	1995	Stanislaw Cembrzynski (POL)	2:20:09	Dorte Rasmussen (DEN)	2:35:48
17	1996	Palle Madsen (DEN)	2:24:43	Anette Hansen (DEN)	2:50:44
18	1997	Søren Rasmussen (DEN)	2:21:28	Karin Bøgh (DEN)	2:47:31
19	1998	Januz Sarnicki (POL)	2:24:12	Karin Bøgh (DEN)	2:51:49
20	1999	Wislaw Göra (DEN)	2:21:05	Guo Hong Xiao (CHN)	2:37:26
21	2000	Samuel Kiplimo (KEN)	2:21:30	Michaela McCallum (GBR)	2:42:26
22	2001	Henrik Jensen (DEN)	2:22:15	Shona Crombie-Hicks (GBR)	2:45:23
23	2002	Janusz Sarnicki (POL)	2:23:53	Anne-Mette Aagaard (DEN)	2:49:31
24	2003	Mostafa Errebbah (ITA)	2:19:57	Anne-Mette Aagaard (DEN)	2:48:52
25	2004	Torben Nielsen (DEN)	2:23:10	Anne-Mette Aagaard (DEN)	2:42:18
26	2005	William Kiprotich (DEN)	2:21:14	Jo Kelsey (GBR)	2:48:21
27	2006	Torben Nielsen (DEN)	2:24:08	Kathrine Tilma (DEN)	2:49:21
28	2007	Julius Mutai (KEN)	2:23:54	Anne-Sofie Pade Hansen (DEN)	2:47:56
29	2008	Julius Mutai (KEN)	2:21:05	Annemette Aagaard (DEN)	2:36:08
30	2009	Toyokazu Yoshimura (JPN)	2:18:04	Chihiro Tanaka (JPN)	2:40:59
31	2010	Mikkel Kleis (DEN)	2:22:29	Colleen De Reuck (USA)	2:30:51
32	2011	Mårten Boström (FIN)	2:21:44	Anne-Sofie Pade Hansen (DEN)	2:45:29
33	2012	Martin Parkhoi (DEN)	2:24:49	Barbara Sánchez (IRL)	2:41:17
34	2013	Rachid Kisri (MAR)	2:17:22	Annemette Aagaard (DEN)	2:44:12
35	2014	Julius Mutai (KEN)	2:17:54	Ayelu Hordofa (ETH)	2:40:02
36	2015	Hassane Ahouchar (MAR)	2:15:24	Nancy Koech (KEN)	2:33:44
37	2016	Aschalew Hunde (ETH)	2:20:47	Gladys Kibiwot (BHR)	2:36:58
38	2017	Julius Karinga (KEN)	2:12:10	Hana Zemedkun (ETH)	2:47:24
39	2018	William Morwabe (KEN)	2:11:15	Shasho Insermu (ETH)	2:32:17
40	2019	Jackson Limo (KEN)	2:09:54	Etalemahu Habtewold (ETH)	2:29:29
41	2020	cancelled due to coronavirus pandemic			
42	2021	cancelled due to coronavirus pandemic			
43	2022	Birhane Tsegay (ERI)	2:08:23	Helah Kiprop (KEN)	2:24:10
44	2023	Solomon Kirwa (KEN)	2:09:12	Rodah Chepkorir Tanui (KEN)	2:23:14
45	2024	Abdi Ali Gelelchu (BHR)	2:09:11	Margaret Agai (KEN)	2:27:31
46	2025	Berhane Tesfaye (ERI)	2:08:25	Sharon Kiptugen (KEN)	2:23:19
47	2026	Tadesse Kassa (ETH)	2:08:26	Mercy Chebwogen (KEN)	2:22:08
