= Olefirenko =

Olefirenko (Ukrainian: Олефіренко) is a Ukrainian surname. Notable people with the surname include:

- Ihor Olefirenko (born 1990), Ukrainian athlete
- Mykhaylo Olefirenko (born 1960), Ukrainian footballer
- Olena Olefirenko (born 1978), Ukrainian rower
