= Masters W60 10000 metres world record progression =

This is the progression of world record improvements of the 10000 metres W60 division of Masters athletics.

Key

Incomplete information Pending

Hand	Auto	Athlete	Nationality	Birthdate	Age	Location	Date	Ref
	37:38.98 Mx	Sally Gibbs	New Zealand	5 June 1963	60 years, 167 days	Wellington	19 November 2023	
	37:57.95	Mariko Yugeta	Japan	13 May 1958	62 years, 185 days	Tokyo	14 November 2020	
	39:04.23	Bernardine Portenski	New Zealand	26 August 1949	60 years, 186 days	Wellington	28 February 2010	
39:21.1 h		Theresia Baird	Australia	1 October 1941	60 years, 26 days	Melbourne	27 October 2001	
41:38.0 h		Edeltraud Pohl	Germany	14 July 1936	61 years, 47 days	Oberhausen	30 August 1997	
42:16.0 h		Jean Albury	Australia	28 September 1929	60 years, 197 days	Hobart	13 April 1990	
43:01.1 h		Jocelyn Ross	Great Britain	18 April 1928	61 years, 82 days	Reading	9 July 1989	
43:21.4 h		Lieselotte Schulz	Germany	7 May 1920	61 years, 105 days	Verden	20 August 1981	
