= 1986 European Athletics Championships – Men's marathon =

Men's marathon at the European Athletics Championships

These are the official results of the Men's marathon event at the 1986 European Championships in Stuttgart, West Germany, held on 30 August 1986.

== Medalists ==
Gold	Gelindo Bordin; Italy (ITA)
Silver	Orlando Pizzolato; Italy (ITA)
Bronze	Herbert Steffny; West Germany (FRG)

== Abbreviations ==
- All times shown are in hours:minutes:seconds

DNS	did not start
NM	no mark
WR	world record
AR	area record
NR	national record
PB	personal best
SB	season best

== Final ranking ==
Rank	Athlete	Time	Note
1st place, gold medalist(s)	Gelindo Bordin (ITA)	2:10.54	
2nd place, silver medalist(s)	Orlando Pizzolato (ITA)	2:10.57	
3rd place, bronze medalist(s)	Herbert Steffny (FRG)	2:11.30	
4	Ralf Salzmann (FRG)	2:11.41	
5	Hugh Jones (GBR)	2:11.49	
6	Gerard Nijboer (NED)	2:12.46	
7	Jacques Lefrand (FRA)	2:12.53	
8	Antoni Niemczak (POL)	2:13.04	
9	Kjell-Erik Ståhl (SWE)	2:13.14	
10	Dirk Vanderherten (BEL)	2:13.29	
11	Alex Gonzalez (FRA)	2:13.36	
12	Wiktor Sawicki (POL)	2:15.16	
13	Gianni Poli (ITA)	2:15.25	
14	Tomislav Ašković (YUG)	2:15.27	
15	Jerzy Skarżyński (POL)	2:16.40	
16	Dick Hooper (IRL)	2:17.45	
17	Jörg Peter (GDR)	2:18.05	
18	Pär Wallin (SWE)	2:19.28	
19	Peter Lyrenmann (SUI)	2:19.49	
20	Steve Jones (GBR)	2:22.12	
21	István Kerékjártó (HUN)	2:22.46	
DID NOT FINISH (DNF)
—	Allister Hutton (GBR)	DNF	
—	Freddy Vandervennet (BEL)	DNF	
—	Henrik Sandstrom (FIN)	DNF	
—	Santiago de la Parte (ESP)	DNF	
—	Svend-Erik Kristensen (DEN)	DNF	
—	Michael Heilmann (GDR)	DNF	
—	Jouni Kortelainen (FIN)	DNF	

== Participation ==
According to an unofficial count, 28 athletes from 16 countries participated in the event.

- Belgium (2)
- Denmark (1)
- East Germany (2)
- Finland (2)
- France (2)
- Hungary (1)
- Ireland (1)
- Italy (3)
- Netherlands (1)
- Poland (3)
- Spain (1)
- Sweden (2)
- Switzerland (1)
- United Kingdom (3)
- West Germany (2)
- Yugoslavia (1)

== See also ==
- 1983 Men's World Championships Marathon (Helsinki)
- 1984 Men's Olympic Marathon (Los Angeles)
- 1986 Marathon Year Ranking
- 1987 Men's World Championships Marathon (Rome)
- 1988 Men's Olympic Marathon (Seoul)
