= Masters W55 3000 metres world record progression =

This is the progression of world record improvements of the 3000 metres W55 division of Masters athletics. Records must be set in properly conducted, official competitions under the standing IAAF rules unless modified by World Masters Athletics. The W55 division consists of female athletes who have reached the age of 55 but have not yet reached the age of 60, so exactly from their 55th birthday to the day before their 60th birthday.

Key

Incomplete information Pending

Hand	Auto	Athlete	Nationality	Birthdate	Location	Date
	10:03.91	Silke Schmidt	Germany	07 Aug 1959	Utrecht	10 Jul 2015
10:13.8		Sandra Branney	United Kingdom	30 April 1954	Edinburgh	31 May 2009
10:38.8		Bernardine Portenski	New Zealand	26 August 1949	Wellington	22 January 2005
11:17.5		Lucia Soranzo	Italy	13 December 1948	Imola	10 June 2004
