= 1987 World Championships in Athletics – Men's marathon =

The Men's Marathon at the 1987 World Championships in Rome, Italy was held on Sunday September 6, 1987.

== Medalists ==
Gold	Douglas Wakiihuri; Kenya (KEN)
Silver	Hussein Ahmed Salah; Djibouti (DJI)
Bronze	Gelindo Bordin; Italy (ITA)

== Abbreviations ==
- All times shown are in hours:minutes:seconds

DNS	did not start
NM	no mark
WR	world record
WL	world leading
AR	area record
NR	national record
PB	personal best
SB	season best

== Records ==
Standing records prior to the 1987 World Athletics Championships
World Record	Carlos Lopes (POR)	2:07:12	April 20, 1985	Rotterdam, Netherlands
Event Record	Robert de Castella (AUS)	2:10:03	August 14, 1983	Helsinki, Finland
Season Best	Hiromi Taniguchi (JPN)	2:09:50	May 10, 1987	London, United Kingdom

== Final ranking ==
RANK	FINAL	TIME
	Douglas Wakiihuri (KEN)	2:11:48
	Hussein Ahmed Salah (DJI)	2:12:30
	Gelindo Bordin (ITA)	2:12:40
4.	Steve Moneghetti (AUS)	2:12:49
5.	Hugh Jones (GBR)	2:12:54
6.	Juma Ikangaa (TAN)	2:13:43
7.	Orlando Pizzolato (ITA)	2:14:03
8.	Ravil Kashapov (URS)	2:14:41
9.	Henrik Jørgensen (DEN)	2:14:58
10.	Dirk Vanderherten (BEL)	2:16:42
11.	Yakov Tolstikov (URS)	2:16:55
12.	Martin Vrabel (TCH)	2:16:58
13.	Salvatore Bettiol (ITA)	2:17:45
14.	Mirko Vindiš (YUG)	2:18:09
15.	Tefera Guta (ETH)	2:18:27
16.	Vicente Antón (ESP)	2:19:00
17.	Herbert Steffny (FRG)	2:19:24
18.	Honorato Hernández (ESP)	2:20:00
19.	Michael Spottel (FRG)	2:20:43
20.	Graham Macky (NZL)	2:20:43
21.	Don Janicki (USA)	2:20:46
22.	Masayuki Nishi (JPN)	2:20:51
23.	Eloi Rodrigues (BRA)	2:21:03
24.	Marti ten Kate (NED)	2:22:21
25.	Kingston Mills (IRL)	2:22:52
26.	Yuichiro Osuda (JPN)	2:23:25
27.	Sam Hlawe (SWZ)	2:24:09
28.	Alfonso Abellán (ESP)	2:24:20
29.	Bigboy Matlapeng (BOT)	2:24:43
30.	Fumiaki Abe (JPN)	2:24:47
31.	Jeong Man-Hwa (KOR)	2:25:41
32.	Peter Maher (CAN)	2:26:40
33.	William Aguirre (NCA)	2:27:19
34.	Vithanakande Samarasinghe (SRI)	2:28:35
35.	José Jami (ECU)	2:29:04
36.	Peter Mitchell (AUS)	2:30:04
37.	Francis Mukuka (ZAM)	2:30:05
38.	Justin Gloden (LUX)	2:30:08
39.	Hsu Gi-sheng (TPE)	2:30:31
40.	Moacir Marconi (BRA)	2:31:39
41.	Stanimir Nenov (BUL)	2:32:44
42.	Hari Singh (IND)	2:34:20
43.	Albert Marie (SEY)	2:40:48
44.	Veselin Vasilev (BUL)	2:43:14
45.	Salvator Sahabo (BRU)	2:43:43
46.	Chandra Bahadur Gurung (NEP)	2:43:54
47.	William Abrams (GUY)	3:12:33
—	Ralf Salzmann (FRG)	DNF
—	Bruno Lafranchi (SUI)	DNF
—	Policarpio Calizaya (BOL)	DNF
—	Robert de Castella (AUS)	DNF
—	Christos Papachristos (GRE)	DNF
—	El Mostafa Nechchadi (MAR)	DNF
—	Dan Grimes (USA)	DNF
—	Geoff Smith (GBR)	DNF
—	Abebe Mekonnen (ETH)	DNF
—	Delfim Moreira (POR)	DNF
—	Martti Vainio (FIN)	DNF
—	Mehmet Terzi (TUR)	DNF
—	Alain Lazare (FRA)	DNF
—	Dave Gordon (USA)	DNF
—	Jorge Yeber (ARG)	DNF
—	Djama Robleh (DJI)	DNF
—	James Walker (GUM)	DNF
—	Samu Samuelu (WSM)	DNF
—	Bogusław Psujek (POL)	DNF
—	Allan Zachariassen (DEN)	DNF

== See also ==
- 1987 Marathon Year Ranking
- Men's Olympic Marathon (1988)
