= Alice Mason (runner) =

New Zealand athlete

Personal information
- Full name: Alice Clare Mason
- Born: 15 June 1987 (age 38)
- Occupation: Physician

Sport
- Country: New Zealand
- Sport: Track and Field
- Event: Marathon

Alice Clare Mason (born 15 June 1987) is a New Zealand long-distance runner. She was the 2021 national champion for New Zealand in the marathon. She runs for the Wellington Harrier Athletic Club.

== Career ==
Mason ran a PB of 2:38:35 whilst finishing fifth at the Sydney Marathon in September 2019. With that performance she achieved the Olympic qualifying standard after finishing in the top five in a gold label race. A doctor, Mason had put her career on hiatus to try and qualify for the 2020 Tokyo Olympics. After the COVID-19 pandemic started however, she took a part time job again at an urgent-care centre in Tauranga.

In June 2020, Mason changed coaches to join the roster of Craig Kirkwood; a former runner himself, he also had Olympic 1500 metre qualifier Sam Tanner and triathlete Hayden Wilde in his training group.

Mason, a three-time defending New Zealand champion, won the ASB Auckland Marathon women's title in November 2020.
