= Orlando Pizzolato =

Italian long-distance runner (born 1958)

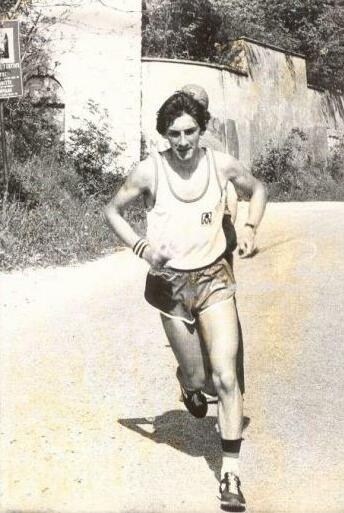

Personal information
- Nationality: Italian
- Born: 30 July 1958 (age 67) Thiene, Italy
- Height: 1.79 m (5 ft 10 in)
- Weight: 61 kg (134 lb)

Sport
- Country: Italy
- Sport: Athletics
- Event: Marathon
- Club: CUS Universo Ferrera

Achievements and titles
- Personal best: Marathon: 2:10:23 (1985)
Medal record
Men's athletics
Representing Italy
European Championships
Silver medal – second place	1986 Stuttgart	Marathon
Summer Universiade
Gold medal – first place	1985 Kobe	Half marathon

Orlando Pizzolato (born 30 July 1958) is a retired long-distance runner from Italy.

== Biography ==
He represented his native country in the men's marathon at the 1988 Summer Olympics, finishing in 16th place (2:15:20). His biggest success was twice winning the New York City Marathon (1984 and 1985), and the silver medal in the men's marathon at the 1986 European Championships in Stuttgart, West Germany.

== Achievements ==
- All results regarding marathon, unless stated otherwise

Year	Competition	Venue	Position	Notes
1984	New York City Marathon	New York City, United States	1st	2:14:53
1985	IAAF World Cup	Hiroshima, Japan	6th	2:10:23
1985	New York City Marathon	New York City, United States	1st	2:11:34
1986	Boston Marathon	Boston, United States	3rd	2:11:43
1986	European Championships	Stuttgart, West Germany	2nd	2:10:57
1986	New York City Marathon	New York City, United States	3rd	2:12:13
1987	World Championships	Rome, Italy	7th	2:14:03
1987	New York City Marathon	New York City, United States	6th	2:12:50
1988	Boston Marathon	Boston, United States	7th	2:12:32
1988	Olympic Games	Seoul, South Korea	16th	2:15:20
1988	Venice Marathon	Venice, Italy	1st	2:15:24
