= Santiago de la Parte =

Santiago de la Parte de las Cuevas (born August 18, 1948, in Amusco, Palencia) is a retired male long-distance runner from Spain, who represented his native country at the 1984 Summer Olympics in the men's marathon. He set his personal best (2:11:10) on February 12, 1984, finishing in third place at the Tokyo Marathon. De la Parte twice won the national marathon title during his career: 1982 and 1986. He is a three-time winner of the Cross Internacional de Venta de Baños: 1980, 1981 and 1982.

As of 2022, de la Parte is also the coach of Spanish long-distance runner Carla Gallardo.

== Achievements ==
Year	Competition	Venue	Position	Event	Notes
Representing Spain
1982	European Championships	Athens, Greece	—	Marathon	DNF
1983	World Championships	Helsinki, Finland	—	Marathon	DNF
1984	Tokyo Marathon	Tokyo, Japan	3rd	Marathon	2:11:10
1984	Olympic Games	Los Angeles, United States	—	Marathon	DNF
1986	European Championships	Stuttgart, West Germany	—	Marathon	DNF
