= Huub Pragt =

Dutch egyptologist and former athlete

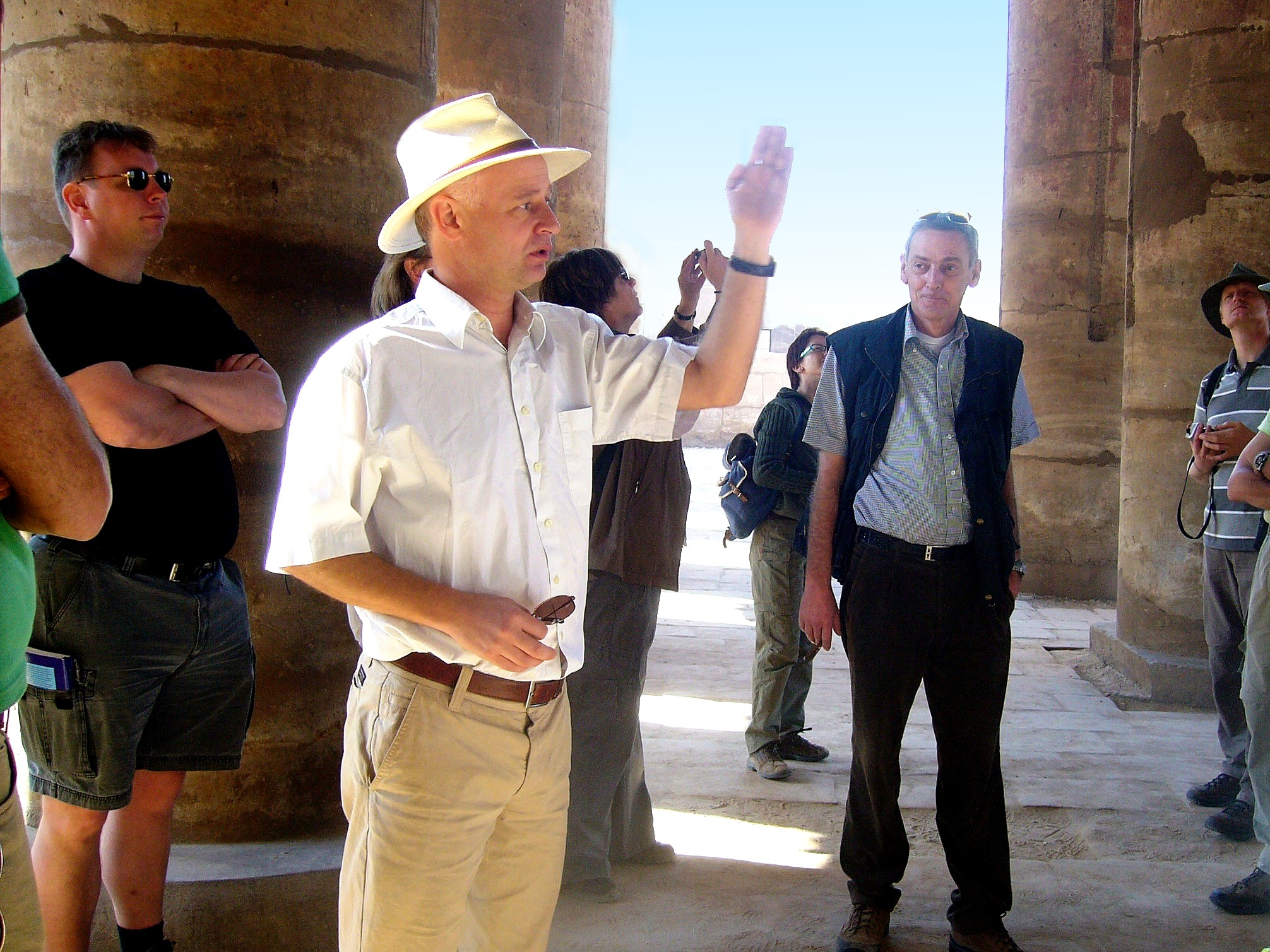
- Occupation: Egyptologist

Hubertus Johannes (Huub) Pragt (Eindhoven, 28 July 1961) is a Dutch Egyptologist and former athlete, and author of scientific books as well as novels. His best performance as an athlete is winning the Dutch national marathon championship. He also won a bronze medal at the Dutch national 25 km championship and competed in several other national championships As an Egyptologist he worked in Egypt, affiliated with the Dutch National Museum of Antiquities in Leiden, wrote a number of books (both non-fiction and fiction) and he gives lectures about Egyptology and archeology in Egypt.

== Athletics ==
Pragt started with athletics at the age of fifteen in the Belgian city of Tongeren. In 1980 he joined the club Ilion in Zoetermeer and in 1983 V&LTC, a (former) club in The Hague. There Pragt subsequently developed into an athlete, first on the track and later on the road, however without qualifying for medals.

In 1989 his athletics career took a turn. While working at a scientific project in Egypt, he participated in the Egyptian national athletics championships in Alexandria. Pragt registered for the title fight in the 5000 m, where he won as a foreigner in a time of 14.35, about ten second ahead of the fastest Egyptian runner, who finished in a time of 14.45.1.

Six months later, on 8 October 1989, Huub Pragt became Dutch champion of the marathon in Helmond, in 2:23.27 It was his second marathon ever, having debuted at this distance in the Midwinter Marathon in Apeldoorn a few years earlier. Two years after his Dutch title, Pragt became the first winner of the Leiden Marathon in 1991.

On 31 December 1999, Pragt ended his athletics career. From January 1997 he was active as a running trainer at an athletics club in Hilversum.

== Egyptologist ==
Huub Pragt studied Egyptology at Leiden University. As part of his studies, he worked at the Museum of Fine Arts in Boston. He has also studied epigraphic work on masta graves on the Giza Plateau as part of the Giza Mastaba Project.

From 1990 to 2001, Huub Pragt worked at the National Museum of Antiquities in Leiden, first as an educator, later as a producer. During this period Pragt, in collaboration with the NOS Jeugdjournaal of the Dutch national television network NOS, he came up with an April fools´ joke. On 1 April 1993 it was reported that the heart of a mummy had started to beat in the National Museum of Antiquities. With great interest, the coffin containing the mummy was opened, where a note revealed that it was an April Fools´ joke.

Pragt is specialized in giving courses and lectures, guiding trips and short excursions in the field of ancient Egypt.

== Novels ==
Pragt has written several novels set in Egypt. His debut novel De Verborgen Tombe (The hidden tomb) was published in November 2008. In this book, dedicated to the archaeologist Isabelle Montet, a great-niece of the famous Egyptologist Pierre Montet (1885–1966), Pragt describes a story partly based on true facts, partly in Ancient Egypt and in modern times. In fact, it concerns several intertwined stories: a contemporary entanglement, which resembles a detective story, around the mysterious disappearance of some investigators and a journalist whose search traces back to a previous, forgotten story.

This last story is about how the high priest Menkheperra became king over Upper Egypt. During his long reign, the tombs of the mighty pharaohs were opened in the Valley of the Kings. The gold and silver that emerged was used by priest-king Menkheperra for the decoration of his still undiscovered royal tomb.

His second novel, Kunstroof in Egypte (Art heist in Egypt) is a thriller. The book is set in the period of the so-called Egyptian Facebook revolution, which began on January 25, 2011, and ended eighteen days later with the departure of the president.

== Publications (selection) ==
=== Non-fiction ===
- H. Pragt: Hiërogliefen. Het schrift ontcijferd. Leiden, 2001. ISBN 9061101808
- H. Pragt en C. Couvée: De sterren boven Egypte. Hilversum, 2006. ISBN 9081047418
- Hans Schoens & Huub Pragt: Opper-Nubië. Van Naga tot Aboe Oda. Purmerend, 2015. ISBN 978-90-810474-4-9

=== Fiction ===
- Huub Pragt: De Verborgen Tombe. Hilversum, 2008. ISBN 9789081047425
- Huub Pragt: Kunstroof in Egypte. Hilversum, 2011. ISBN 9789081047401

== See also ==
- List of marathon national champions (men)
- Abydos King List
