= Jouni Kortelainen =

Finnish long-distance runner

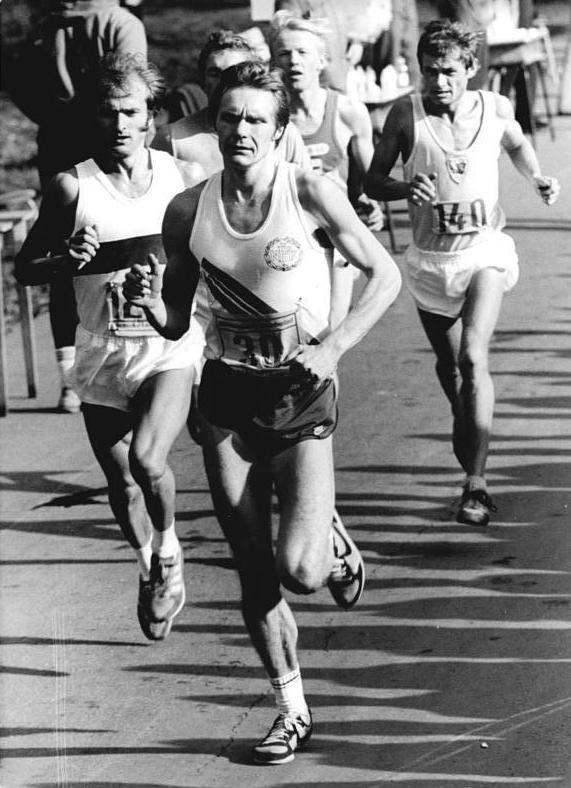
Jouni Kortelainen (in the back) in 1980

Jouni Ensio Kortelainen (born 9 June 1957 in Polvijärvi) is a retired male long-distance runner from Finland. He represented his native country at the 1980 Summer Olympics in the men's marathon. He set his personal best (2:12:09) in the classic distance on 3 May 1980, finishing in fourth place in Chemnitz. Kortelainen won the men's national marathon title in 1986.

== Achievements ==
Year	Competition	Venue	Position	Event	Notes
Representing Finland
1978	Košice Peace Marathon	Košice, Czechoslovakia	3rd	Marathon	2:16:50.2
1979	Košice Peace Marathon	Košice, Czechoslovakia	1st	Marathon	2:15:12
1980	Olympic Games	Moscow, Soviet Union	—	Marathon	DNF
1981	Boston Marathon	Boston, United States	12th	Marathon	2:13:15
1982	Tokyo Marathon	Tokyo, Japan	5th	Marathon	2:12:15
1986	European Championships	Stuttgart, West Germany	—	Marathon	DNF
1987	Hamburg Marathon	Hamburg, West Germany	5th	Marathon	2:17:03
1990	Hamburg Marathon	Hamburg, West Germany	12th	Marathon	2:17:14
1991	Hamburg Marathon	Hamburg, Germany	10th	Marathon	2:17:09
1992	Houston Marathon	Houston, United States	8th	Marathon	2:15:58
