= James Walker (runner) =

Marathon runner from Guam

James Walker (born August 18, 1954) is a marathon runner. Walker, who gained Guam citizenship through residency, competed for Guam at the 1988 Summer Olympics in Seoul, South Korea in the marathon, finishing 90th at 2:56:32.

Walker is a graduate of the University of Richmond, class of 1976. Though he didn't run competitively in college, Walker competed internationally three years after the 1988 Games and kept running recreationally for decades, including in multiple Boston Marathons. At age 60, he ran the 2014 Boston Marathon.

== Achievements ==
Year	Competition	Venue	Position	Notes
Representing Guam
1987	World Championships	Rome, Italy	—	DNF
1988	Olympic Games	Seoul, South Korea	90th	2:56:32
