= El Mostafa Nechchadi =

Moroccan long-distance runner

El Mostafa Nechchadi (Arabic: المصطفى نشاشدي; born 15 November 1962) is a retired Moroccan long-distance runner who specialized in the marathon.

Nechchadi was a 1988 Olympian in the marathon, but did not finish the race. His personal best time was 2:10:09 hours achieved in 1987, and he held the Moroccan national marathon record for 10 years. He was second in the 1987 London Marathon and ranked #3 in the world for marathon that year. In 1989 he was ranked #1 in the world for half-marathon with 1:02:01 hours.

Now an American citizen, he is a coach for the running group Promotion in Motion International, which includes Catherine Ndereba.

== Achievements ==
Year	Competition	Venue	Position	Notes
Representing Morocco
1987	World Championships	Rome, Italy	—	DNF
