= Henrik Jørgensen (runner) =

Danish marathon runner (1961–2019)

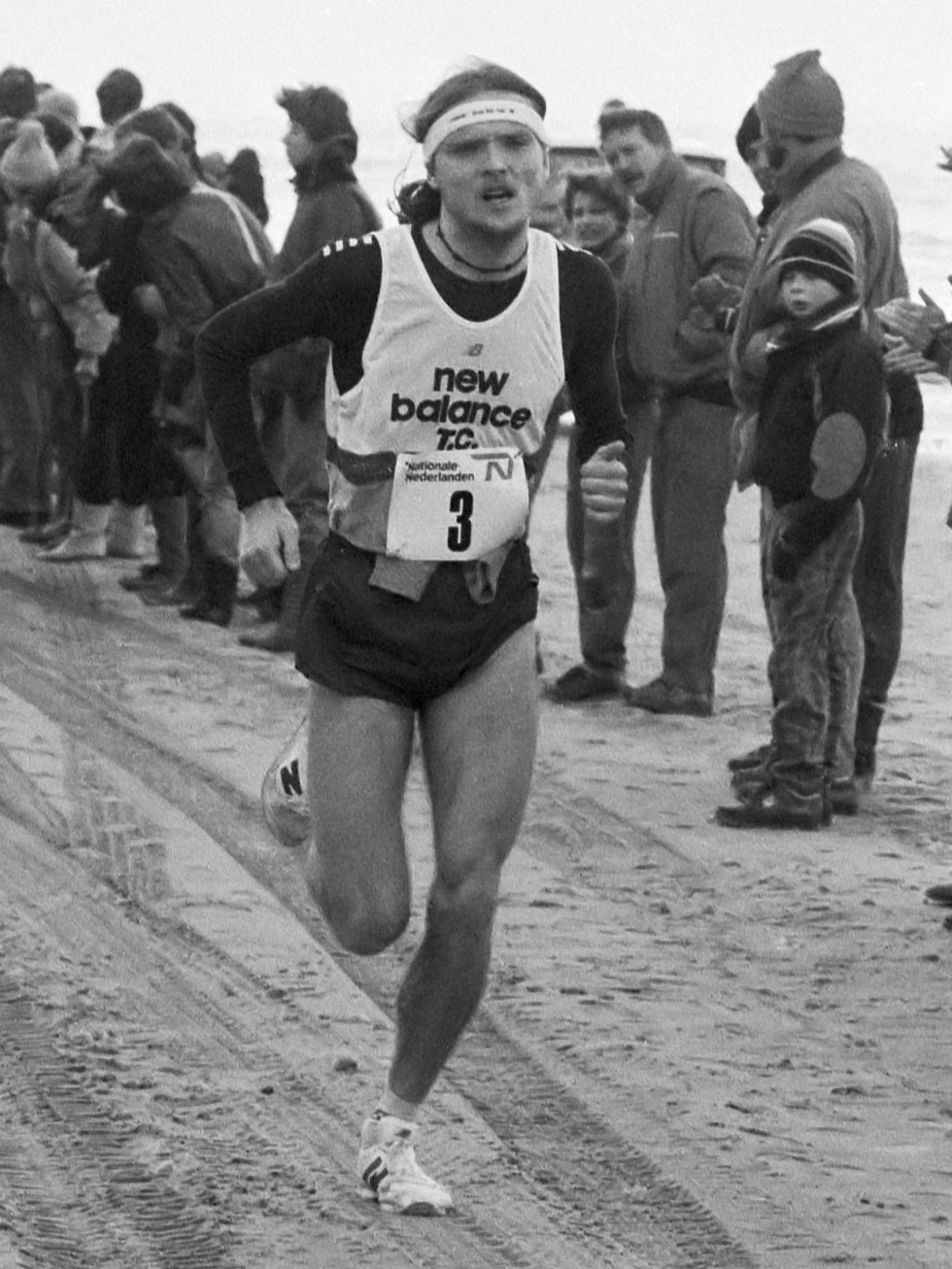
- Henrik Jørgensen (1986)

Personal information
- Nationality: Danish
- Born: 10 October 1961 Copenhagen, Denmark
- Died: 26 January 2019 (aged 57) Sorthat-Muleby, Bornholm, Denmark
- Height: 178 cm (5 ft 10 in)
- Weight: 59 kg (130 lb)

Sport
- Sport: Athletics
- Event: Long-distance
- Club: Herlev IF / KIF Atletik

Henrik Høve Jørgensen (10 October 1961 – 26 January 2019) was a Danish marathon runner, who won the London Marathon in 1988. He finished 5th in 1985 in 2:09.43 hours – this time remains the Danish national record and stood as the Nordic record for over 30 years until beaten by Sondre Nordstad Moen in 2017. Born in Herlev, Jørgensen represented his native country in the men's marathon at the 1984 and the 1988 Summer Olympics in Seoul, South Korea.

He was a two-time national champion in the men's 5000 m and won the British AAA Championships title by virtue of winning the London marathon.

Jørgensen competed for Iowa State University, Ames, Iowa, USA in the spring of 1981 (following injury during the fall of 1980), returning to Denmark later that year..

Jørgensen died on Bornholm in January 2019 aged 57, from a heart attack during a training run

Danish distance runner Anna Holm Baumeister is Jørgensen's daughter.

== Achievements ==
Year	Competition	Venue	Position	Event	Notes
Representing Denmark
1982	Copenhagen Marathon	Copenhagen, Denmark	1st	Marathon	2:22:19
1983	Copenhagen Marathon	Copenhagen, Denmark	1st	Marathon	2:16:41
1983	London Marathon	London, United Kingdom	3rd	Marathon	2:10:47
1983	World Championships	Helsinki, Finland	19th	Marathon	2:14:10
1984	Olympic Games	Los Angeles, United States	19th	Marathon	2:15:55
1984	Tokyo Marathon	Tokyo, Japan	5th	Marathon	2:11:31
1985	London Marathon	London, United Kingdom	5th	Marathon	2:09:43
1986	Berlin Marathon	West Berlin, West Germany	2nd	Marathon	2:11:49
1987	World Championships	Rome, Italy	9th	Marathon	2:14:58
1988	London Marathon	London, United Kingdom	1st	Marathon	2:10:20
1988	Olympic Games	Seoul, South Korea	22nd	Marathon	2:16:40
