= Auckland Marathon =

Annual race in New Zealand held since 1992

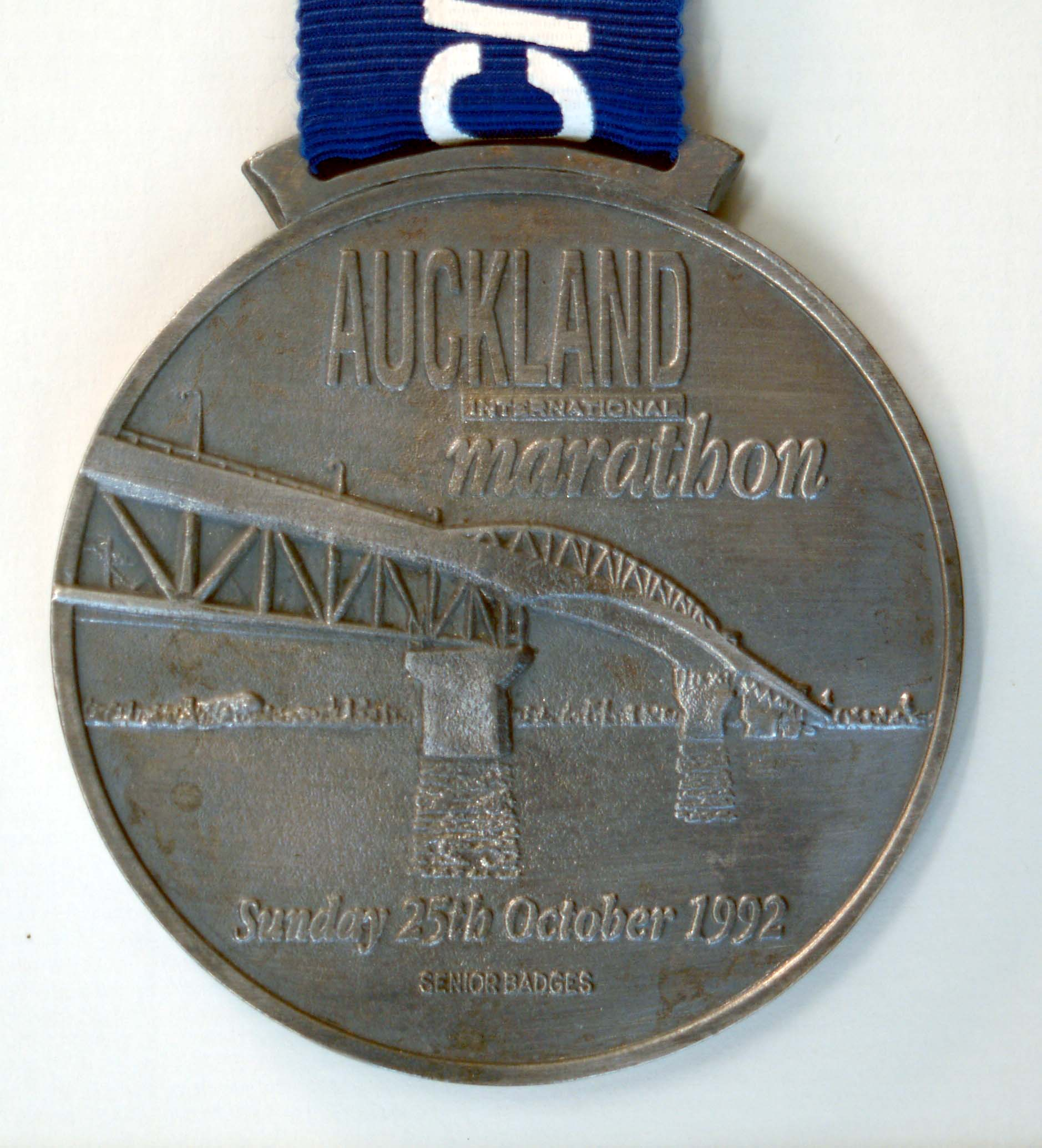
- Finisher medal from inaugural marathon in 1992
- Date: Late October or early November
- Location: Auckland, New Zealand
- Event type: Road
- Distance: Marathon
- Primary sponsor: Barfoot & Thompson
- Established: 1992 (34 years ago)
- Course records: Men's: 2:14:03 (1997) (New Zealand) Phil Costley; Women's: 2:38:47 (1999) (New Zealand) Gabrielle O'Rourke
- Website: Auckland Marathon
- Participants: 867 finishers (2022); 1,618 (2020); 1,645 (2019)

The Barfoot & Thompson Auckland Marathon and Half Marathon is an annual running event held in Auckland, New Zealand. The event is held in October or early November of each year, which is during the spring in New Zealand. The main feature of the event is the crossing of the Auckland Harbour Bridge, which involves a climb of 33 metres to the highest point.

== History ==
The first Auckland Marathon was held in June 1936, using an Auckland waterfront course. The race did not become an annual event until 1949, or the 1960s, or until 1992 if the Great Northern Marathon (Takanini) events are not regarded as the Auckland Marathon editions of 1989 to 1991, and it was not until October 1992 that the Harbour Bridge crossing was first used, becoming the first sports event to cross the Auckland Harbour Bridge.

The Harbour Bridge crossing was the brainchild of Rendell McIntosh, a 1974 British Commonwealth Games 400 metres hurdles competitor. Together with Paul Ryken, as Race Director, they planned and implemented the first event on the 25 October 1992. The initial bridge crossing event attracted over 3,000 entrants, had 500 accredited media and a budget of $450,000.

In September 2006, the Auckland marathon course was officially measured by approved measurer Bob Braid. This means an athlete's time over the 2006 marathon course can be recognised to qualify for international events such as the World Championships in Athletics.

The 2020 edition of the race, held on 1 November 2020, was notable for being one of the only large marathons in the world that was held during a time when many other countries were suffering through the second wave of the coronavirus pandemic, as the effective coronavirus management protocols in New Zealand allowed thousands of runners to compete in the race.

== Course ==
External image
- Course map of full marathon in 2020

The course begins in the seaside suburb of Devonport on the North Shore and travels through Takapuna and Northcote before crossing the Harbour Bridge and heading towards the finish line at Victoria Park.

While the half marathon runners complete their race at Victoria Park, those competing in the full marathon continue eastward through Viaduct Harbour and along Tamaki Drive to the turn-around point at Saint Heliers Bay. The marathon then returns along Tamaki Drive and back to Victoria Park.

== Winners ==
Key: Course record (in bold)

Ed.	Year	Men's Winner	Time	Women's Winner	Time	Rf.
1	1992	Mark Hutchinson (NZL)	2:16:32	Anne Roden (GBR)	2:39:41	
2	1993	Kerry Rodger (NZL)	2:19:58	Raewyn Rodger (NZL)	2:46:17	
3	1994	Lucas Matlala (RSA)	2:27:41	Bernardine Portenski (NZL)	2:50:52	
4	1995	Paul Herlihy (NZL)	2:22:34	Tracey Clissold (NZL)	2:42:44	
5	1996	Phil Costley (NZL)	2:20:32	Tracey Clissold (NZL)	2:39:03	
6	1997	Phil Costley (NZL)	**2:14:03**	Bernardine Portenski (NZL)	2:45:57	
7	1998	Mark Hutchinson (NZL)	2:24:51	Bernardine Portenski (NZL)	2:44:52	
8	1999	Phil Costley (NZL)	2:17:43	Gabrielle O'Rourke (NZL)	2:38:47	
9	2000	Mark Hutchinson (NZL)	2:24:58	Melissa Moon (NZL)	2:45:42	
10	2001	Phillip Clode (NZL)	2:28:45	Bernardine Portenski (NZL)	2:51:40	
11	2002	Craig Burke (NZL)	2:32:50	Zelah Morrall (GBR)	2:53:14	
12	2003	Scott Winton (NZL)	2:30:06	Nicole Cope (NZL)	2:55:45	
13	2004	Dale Warrander (NZL)	2:16:50	Tracey Clissold (NZL)	2:41:58	
14	2005	Phil Costley (NZL)	2:22:07	Sharon Fitzgerald (NZL)	2:53:42	
15	2006	Dale Warrander (NZL)	2:17:43	Tracey Clissold (NZL)	2:50:47	
16	2007	Matthew Smith (GBR)	2:20:41	Ady Ngawati (NZL)	2:49:05	
17	2008	Ben Ruthe (NZL)	2:28:11	Ady Ngawati (NZL)	2:46:47	
18	2009	Rowan Hooper (NZL)	2:31:46	Jessica Ruthe (NZL)	2:49:55	
19	2010	Dale Warrander (NZL)	2:19:22	Shireen Crumpton (NZL)	2:45:51	
20	2011	Dale Warrander (NZL)	2:24:42	Lisa Robertson (NZL)	2:41:56	
21	2012	Rowan Walker (AUS)	2:24:07	Alexandra Williams (NZL)	2:41:29	
22	2013	Samuel Wreford (NZL)	2:18:57	Kirsten Molloy (AUS)	2:52:24	
23	2014	Stephen Lett (NZL)	2:27:38	Liza Hunter-Galvan (NZL)	2:47:42	
24	2015	Aaron Pulford (NZL)	2:27:01	Katie Kemp (NZL)	2:42:35	
25	2016	Oska Baynes (NZL)	2:20:36	Nicole Goldsmid (NZL)	2:47:45	
26	2017	Matthew Davy (NZL)	2:24:14	Hannah Oldroyd (NZL)	2:54:11	
27	2018	David Criniti (AUS)	2:24:13	Fiona Yates (AUS)	2:48:31	
28	2019	Isaias Beyn (ERI)	2:19:32	Hannah Wells (NZL)	2:50:47	
29	2020	Daniel Jones (NZL)	2:21:57	Alice Mason (NZL)	2:43:32	
30	2022	Daniel Jones (NZL)	2:20:00	Lisa Cross (NZL)	2:50:44	
31	2023	Daniel Balchin (NZL)	2:23:09	Alice Mason (NZL)	2:44:20	
32	2024	Oska Baynes (NZL)	2:21:49	Brigid Dennehy (IRL)	2:41:31	
33	2025	Daniel Balchin (NZL)	2:19:55	Brigid Dennehy (IRL)	**2:38:10**	
33	2025	TOBY GUALTER (NZL)	02:15:29	Brigid Dennehy (IRL)	2:42:49	
