= Graham Macky =

New Zealand long-distance runner

Graham Hamilton Macky (born 16 February 1954) is a long-distance runner from New Zealand, clocking his personal best of 2:14:36 in Beijing, 1986. He won his first national title in the men's marathon in 1983, clocking 2:21:22 in Mosgiel, and won the Rotorua Marathon in 1991.

Macky continues to run, and since moving to Auckland in 2000 with his wife, Deborah Macky, and daughters Bridie Macky and Tessa Macky, has run for the Auckland University Track Club. Prior to this Macky ran for the Scottish Harriers (1975–1988), and for Christchurch Avon (1988–1999).

== Achievements ==
- All results regarding marathon, unless stated otherwise

Year	Competition	Venue	Position	Notes
Representing New Zealand
1987	World Championships	Rome, Italy	20th	2:20:43
