= Ralf Salzmann =

German long-distance runner (born 1955)

Ralf Salzmann (born February 6, 1955, in Kassel) is a former long-distance runner from Germany, who represented West Germany in the men's marathon at the 1984 Summer Olympics in Los Angeles, California. There he finished in 18th position, clocking 2:15:29. Four years later, when Seoul hosted the Games, he ended up in 23rd place (2:16:54). He won the Tiberias Marathon in 1982.

Salzmann became West German marathon champion in 1980, 1981, 1982, 1983 and 1984, as well as winning the 10,000 metres in 1988. He represented the clubs LG Frankfurt and PSV Grün-Weiß Kassel.

== Achievements ==
Year	Competition	Venue	Position	Event	Notes
Representing West Germany
1982	European Championships	Athens, Greece	22nd	Marathon	2:27:24
1983	World Championships	Helsinki, Finland	—	Marathon	DNF
1984	Olympic Games	Los Angeles, United States	18th	Marathon	2:15:29
1986	European Championships	Stuttgart, West Germany	4th	Marathon	2:11:41
1987	World Championships	Rome, Italy	—	Marathon	DNF
1988	Olympic Games	Seoul, South Korea	23rd	Marathon	2:16:54
