= Dale Warrander =

New Zealand long-distance runner

Personal information
- Born: 8 September 1973 (age 52)

Sport
- Country: New Zealand
- Sport: Athletics
- Event: Marathon

Dale Warrander (born 8 September 1973), sometimes incorrectly spelled Warrender, is a New Zealand long distance runner. His personal best in the marathon is 2:12.58, set in Fukuoka, 2004.

He competed at the 2004 Summer Olympics in Athens, in the men's marathon. He has enjoyed victory in many of New Zealand's premier road running events including multiple Auckland Marathon titles. His most recent Auckland Marathon victory was at the 2006 event with a winning time of 2:17.43 in testing conditions, over 15 minutes ahead of second placed Mark Williams. In 2007, he switched to the half marathon event, winning with a time of 1:06:52.
