= Artidoro Berti =

Italian long-distance runner

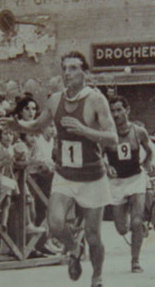
- Berti running in 1936

Personal information
- Nationality: Italian
- Born: 29 July 1920 Pistoia, Italy
- Died: 9 January 2005 (aged 84) Iano, Italy

Sport
- Sport: Long-distance running
- Event: Marathon

Artidoro Berti (29 July 1920 – 9 January 2005) was an Italian long-distance runner. He competed in the marathon at the 1952 Summer Olympics.
