= Antoni Niemczak =

Polish long-distance runner

Antoni Niemczak (born 17 November 1955) is a retired long-distance runner from Poland, who won the inaugural 1984 edition of the Vienna Marathon, clocking 2:12:17 on March 25, 1984. He finished in eighth place at the 1986 European Championships in Stuttgart, West Germany. His best marathon time is 2:09:41, which he ran on October 28, 1990, in the Chicago Marathon. He finished in second place with a margin of less than one second between him and Martin Pitayo. Antoni was ranked seventh in the world for the marathon in 1990, the same year he won the San Francisco Marathon.

== Suspension ==
Niemczak tested positive for the anabolic steroid Nandrolone after finishing second at the 1986 New York City Marathon. , Niemczak received a two-year suspension from the sport.

== Achievements ==
Year	Competition	Venue	Position	Event	Notes
Representing Poland
1984	Vienna Marathon	Vienna, Austria	1st	Marathon	2:12:17
1986	European Championships	Stuttgart, West Germany	8th	Marathon	2:13:04
1986	1986 New York City Marathon	New York, USA	DSQ (2nd)	Marathon	
1990	San Francisco Marathon	San Francisco, United States	1st	Marathon	2:13:48
1991	World Championships	Tokyo, Japan	—	Marathon	DNF
