= Franco Togni =

Italian marathon runner and mountain runner

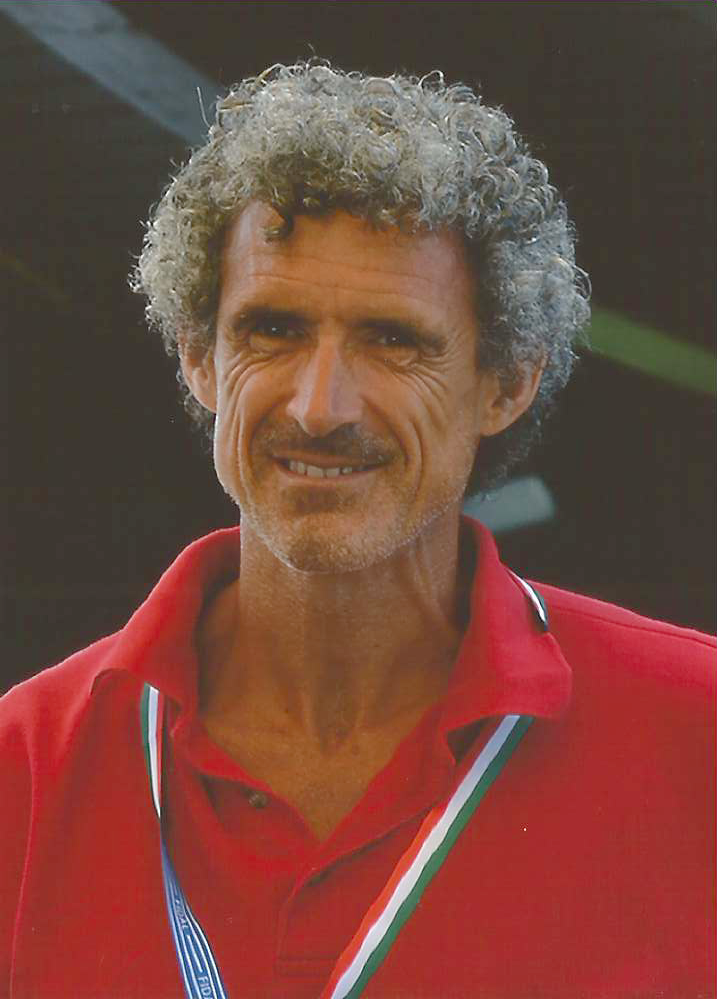

Personal information
- Full name: Francesco Togni
- Nationality: Italian
- Born: 3 November 1960 Alzano Lombardo
- Died: 29 December 2016 (aged 56) Carona

Sport
- Country: Italy (18 cap)
- Sport: Mountain running Athletics
- Event: Marathon
- Club: Runners Bergamo

Achievements and titles
- Personal best: Marathon: 2:12:36 (1996)

Franco Togni (3 November 1960 - 29 December 2016) was an Italian male marathon runner and mountain runner. He won one national championships at senior level (1996 marathon).

== Biography ==
On December 29, 2016, at the age of 56, he died as a result of a mountain accident, near the Valsecca Pass, during the crossing from the Fratelli Calvi refuge to the Baroni al Brunone refuge.
