= Wiktor Sawicki =

Polish long-distance runner

Wiktor Sawicki (born 20 May 1955) is a retired Polish runner who specialized in the marathon.

He finished twelfth in the marathon at the 1986 European Championships. He became Polish champion in the 20 kilometres race in 1986 and in the marathon in 1988.
