= Phil Costley =

New Zealand athlete

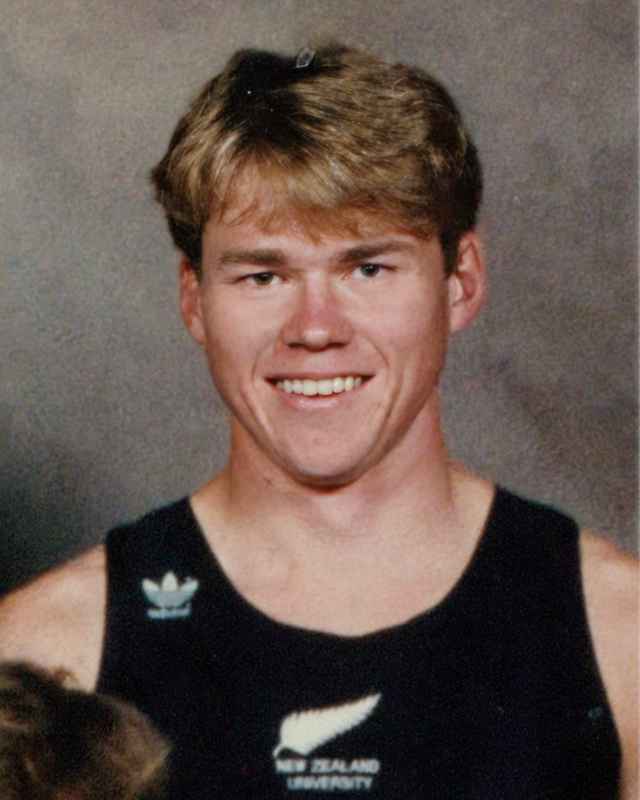
- Costley in 1990

Personal information
- Born: Philip Costley; 1970 (age 55–56) Wairoa, New Zealand
- Occupation: School teacher
- Height: 1.70 m (5 ft 7 in)

Sport
- Country: New Zealand
- Sport: Athletics

Achievements and titles
- National finals: 3000 m champion (2002); 3000 m steeplechase champion (1994, 1996, 1999, 2000, 2001); 5000 m champion (2003); 10,000 m champion (2008); Marathon champion (1996, 1999)

Philip Costley (born 1970 in Wairoa, New Zealand) is a New Zealand distance runner. He represented his country at the two Commonwealth Games and four World Athletics Cross Country Championships, and has won 33 New Zealand national athletic titles on the track, road and cross country over distances from 3000 metres to 100 kilometres.

Costley holds the men's record in the Auckland Marathon. His record run was in the 1997 event, finishing the race in 2:14:03. He has won the event on a further three occasions (1996, 1999, and 2005).

Costley represented New Zealand twice in the marathon at the Commonwealth Games, placing 18th in 1998 and 17th in 2002.

Costley is a mathematics teacher at Garin College.
