= Luc Krotwaar =

Dutch long-distance runner (born 1968)

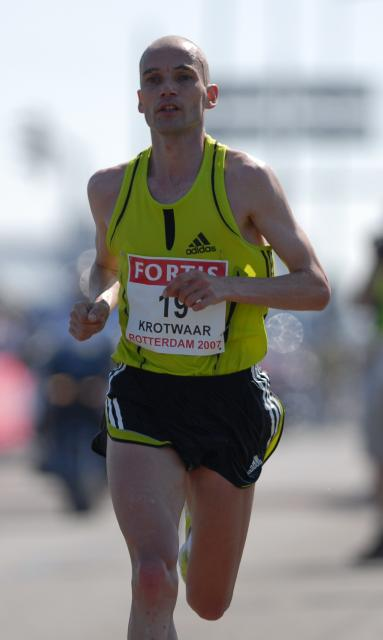

Personal information
- Full name: Luc Krotwaar
- Nickname: The White Kenyan
- Born: 25 January 1968 (age 58) Bergen op Zoom, Netherlands
- Years active: ?-present
- Height: 1.75 m (5 ft 9 in)
- Weight: 60 kg (132 lb)

Achievements and titles
- Personal best(s): 800 metres – 1:49.3 (1988); 1500 metres – 3:41.58 (1988) mile – 4:08.5 (1987); 3000 metres – 8:02.8 (1990); 5000 metres – 13:38.73 (2000); 10000 metres – 28:39.04 (2002); 10 km – 28:09 (2002); 10 miles – 47:18 (1998) half marathon – 1:01.49 (2002) marathon – 2:10.13 (2003)
- Updated on 5 May 2008

Luc Krotwaar (born 25 January 1968 in Bergen op Zoom, North Brabant) is a Dutch long-distance runner, who is nicknamed 'The White Kenyan'.

== Running career ==
In the spring of 2003 Krotwaar ran 2:19.42 in the Rotterdam Marathon and only eight days later 2:13.41 in the Utrecht marathon.

In the fall of 2003, he ran a personal best of 2:10.13 in Fukuoka. He qualified for the 2004 Summer Olympics, but eventually did not start. Krotwaar finished fifteenth at the 2005 World Championships marathon and fourth at 2:12:44 in the 2006 European Athletics Championships in Gothenburg. He finished second in the 2006 Posbankloop in Velp.
