= Domingos Neves =

Portuguese footballer

Personal information
- Full name: Domingos das Neves
- Date of birth: Unknown
- Place of birth: Portugal
- Date of death: Deceased
- Position: Forward

Senior career*
Years	Team	Apps	(Gls)
- Olhanense

International career
1925	Portugal	1	(0)
- * Club domestic league appearances and goals

Domingos das Neves (born unknown - deceased) was a Portuguese footballer who played as a forward.
