= Stefano Natale =

Italian long-distance runner

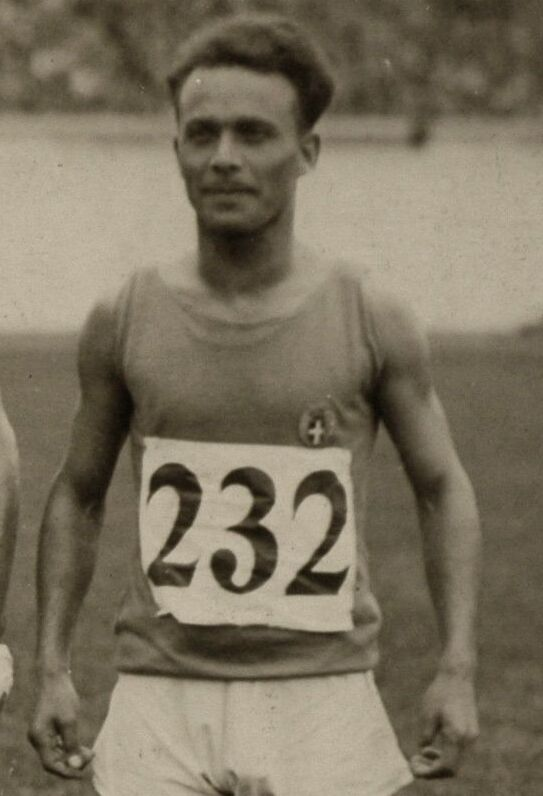
- Natale at the 1928 Summer Olympics

Personal information
- Nationality: Italian
- Born: 16 April 1903 Rome, Italy
- Died: 1970 (aged 66–67)

Sport
- Sport: Long-distance running
- Event: Marathon

Stefano Natale (16 April 1903 – 1970) was an Italian long-distance runner. He competed in the marathon at the 1928 Summer Olympics.
