= Ahmed Labidi =

Tunisian long-distance runner

Personal information
- Nationality: Tunisian
- Born: Mohamed Ali Ahmed Labidi Ben Dali; 19 April 1923 Gammouda, Tunisia
- Died: 17 July 2008 (aged 85)
- Height: 172 cm (5 ft 8 in)
- Weight: 60 kg (132 lb)

Sport
- Sport: Long-distance running
- Events: Marathon, 10,000 metres
- Club: CA Montreuil

Mohamed Ali Ahmed Labidi Ben Dali (Arabic: محمد علي أحمد العبيدي بن دالي, 19 April 1923 – 17 July 2008), known as Ahmed Labidi, was a Tunisian long-distance runner. He competed in the marathon at the 1960 Summer Olympics. He had previously represented France in the 10,000 metres at the 1952 Helsinki Olympics.
