= Svend Erik Kristensen =

Danish long-distance runner

Svend Erik Kristensen (born 24 June 1956) is a retired male long-distance runner from Denmark, who twice represented his native country at the European Athletics Championships during his career: 1982 and 1986. He is a four-time national marathon title in the men's marathon: 1981, 1986, 1990 and 1991.

== Achievements ==
Year	Competition	Venue	Position	Event	Notes
Representing Denmark
1982	Tokyo Marathon	Tokyo, Japan	6th	Marathon	2:12:33
1982	European Championships	Athens, Greece	—	Marathon	DNF
1983	World Championships	Helsinki, Finland	17th	Marathon	2:13:34
1984	Dublin Marathon	Dublin, Ireland	1st	Marathon	2:18:25
1986	European Championships	Stuttgart, West Germany	—	Marathon	DNF
