= Herbert Steffny =

German distance runner

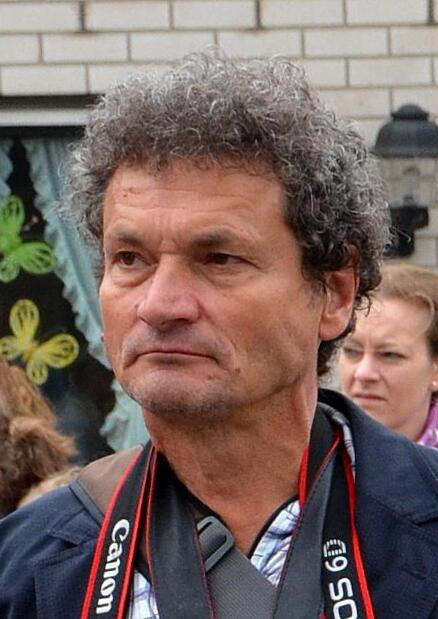
- Herbert Steffny, 2013.

Medal record

Men's athletics

Representing West Germany

European Championships
Bronze medal – third place	1986 Stuttgart	Marathon

Herbert Steffny (born 5 September 1953 in Trier) is a former German long-distance track event runner and prominent physical trainer.

== Professional career ==
After modest successes as a youngster in long-distance running, Steffny gave up the competitive running while studying biology, and returned to competition in the older than 30 category.

His first victory came at the Echternach Marathon in 1983, and in the following year he would place third in the New York City Marathon.

Steffny was the German champion in the 1985 marathon run, 1987 German champion in 10,000 meter run and 1989 German Champion in cross country. In addition came the title in the 25 kilometer road running and fell running. He won the Eurocross competition in Luxembourg in 1988.

He was the first West German marathon runner to hold a medal in a major international event, as he placed 3rd in the 1986 European Championships in Athletics in Stuttgart Germany with a time of 2:11:30.

He competed for Post-Jahn Freiburg. In his active career (officially particularly from the 80's), he was 1.79 meters tall and weighed 67 kg. He wrote the bestselling book on distance running in the German language reading market entitled Das große Laufbuch.

== Achievements ==
- All results regarding marathon, unless stated otherwise

Year	Competition	Venue	Position	Notes
Representing West Germany
1984	New York Marathon	New York City, United States	3rd	2:16:22
1985	Frankfurt Marathon	Frankfurt, West Germany	1st	2:12:12
1986	Chicago Marathon	Chicago, United States	5th	2:11:17
1989	Frankfurt Marathon	Frankfurt, West Germany	1st	2:13:51
1989	Munich Marathon	Munich, West Germany	1st	2:11:30
Representing Germany
1991	Frankfurt Marathon	Frankfurt, Germany	1st	2:13:45
1991	Pittsburgh Marathon	Pittsburgh, United States	1st	2:16:21

- Boston Marathon: 1996 Winner of the Age Class Championship (over 40)

== Personal life ==
Herbert Steffny has a degree in biology and became a running trainer after his sports career. Since 1998, he has published numerous books (among others the German best seller Das große Laufbuch) about running.

He has been a business leader of a company for running seminars, training and trips in the Titisee-Neustadt in the Black Forest. He looked after the former Federal Foreign Minister Joschka Fischer by his marathon training.

Steffny works as a co-commentator for ARD television and presents the live feed in the city marathons of Berlin, Frankfurt, Cologne and Mainz.

Also his older brother, the German Spiridon running magazine editor Manfred Steffny, was also a successful marathon runner.
