= Rino Lavelli =

Italian long-distance runner

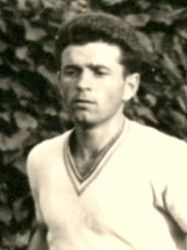
- Rino Lavelli in the 1950s

Personal information
- Nationality: Italian
- Born: 12 November 1928 (age 96) Ponteranica, Italy

Sport
- Sport: Long-distance running
- Event: Marathon

Giuseppe "Rino" Lavelli (born 12 November 1928) is an Italian former long-distance runner. He competed in the marathon at the 1956 Summer Olympics.
