= Ihor Olefirenko =

Ukrainian long-distance runner

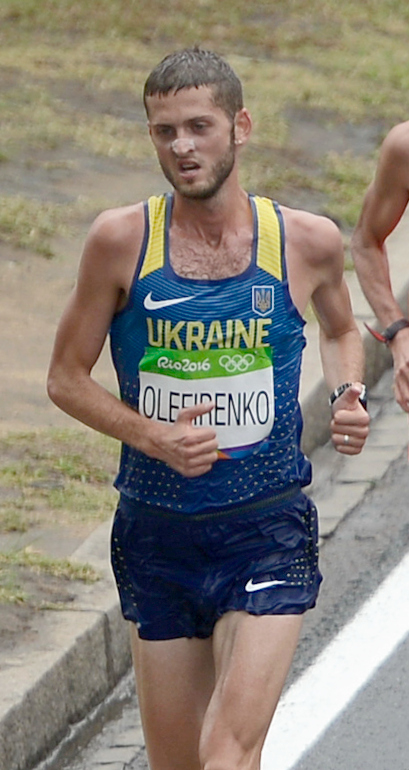
- Olefirenko at the 2016 Olympics

Personal information
- Born: 14 March 1990 (age 36)
- Height: 186 cm (6 ft 1 in)
- Weight: 70 kg (154 lb)

Sport
- Sport: Track and field
- Event: Marathon

Achievements and titles
- Personal best: 2:12:04 (2015)

Ihor Olefirenko (born 14 March 1990) is a Ukrainian long-distance runner and archer. He finished 30th in the marathon at the 2016 Summer Olympics. In 2020, he competed in the men's race at the 2020 World Athletics Half Marathon Championships held in Gdynia, Poland.
