= Salvatore Costantino =

Italian long-distance runner

Personal information
- Nationality: Italian
- Born: 11 January 1919 Naples
- Died: 31 March 1973 (aged 54) Naples

Sport
- Country: Italy
- Sport: Athletics
- Event(s): Long-distance running Marathon

Salvatore Costantino (11 January 1919 – 31 March 1973) was an Italian long-distance runner who competed at the 1936 Summer Olympics.
