= Bernardine Portenski =

New Zealand long-distance runner

Bernie Portenski

Personal information
- Born: Bernardine Judith Coleman; 26 August 1949 Lower Hutt, New Zealand
- Died: 1 February 2017 (aged 67) Wellington, New Zealand

Sport
- Country: New Zealand
- Sport: Athletics

Achievements and titles
- National finals: Marathon champion (1989, 1998, 2002)

Bernardine Judith Portenski (née Coleman; 26 August 1949 – 1 February 2017), commonly known as Bernie Portenski, was a New Zealand long-distance runner. She set numerous age-group world records, and competed at events ranging from 800 metres to marathon.

== Athletics ==
Portenski took up running at the age of 30, and discovered a liking for long-distance events. She ran 114 marathons, including competing at the annual Rotorua Marathon on 33 occasions. In 1992 she qualified for the Olympics, but was deemed too old by the New Zealand Olympic selectors and was not added to the team.

== Personal life ==
Portenski was born in Lower Hutt on 26 August 1949, the daughter of Mary Coleman (née Caroll) and John Coleman, and educated at Sacred Heart College. When not running, Portenski ran a hairdressing salon in the Wellington suburb of Miramar. She was married to Peter Horan, and had one daughter and one stepson. Portenski was diagnosed with ovarian cancer in May 2016.

Portenski died in Wellington on 1 February 2017 at the age of 67 from the ovarian cancer with which she had been diagnosed the previous year.

== Records and achievements ==
Portenski recorded the following times, titles, and records:

Open

- Winner, 2001 Auckland Marathon

40–44 age group

- 34:48.95 for the 10,000 metres (at Wellington, 1993) – New Zealand age-group record

45–49 age group

- 17:32.13 for the 5000 metres (at Hastings, New Zealand, 18 January 1998) – New Zealand age-group record
- 35:35.5 for the 10,000 metres (at Wellington, 1 February 1998) – New Zealand age-group record
- 2:43:38 for the marathon (at Rotorua, 2 May 1998) – New Zealand age-group record
- Winner, 1998 New York Marathon (45–49 age-group)

50–54 age group

- 5:00.58 for the 1500 metres (in 2002) – New Zealand age-group record
- 17:22.22 for the 5000 metres (at Wellington, 10 February 2002) – New Zealand age-group record, world third-fastest
- 36:34.24 for the 10,000 metres (at Inglewood, New Zealand, 21 January 2002) – New Zealand age-group record, world second-fastest
- 2:51:40 for the marathon (at Auckland, 28 October 2001) – New Zealand age-group record

55–59 age group

- 2:38.36 for the 800 metres (at Wellington, 22 January 2005) – second-fastest by a New Zealander
- 17:58.05 for the 5000 metres (at Wellington, 6 February 2005) – World age-group record
- 37:22.37 for the 10,000 metres (at Wellington, 16 April 2006) – World age-group record
- 1:24:50 for the half-marathon (at Wellington, 1993) – New Zealand age-group record, world second-fastest
- 2:59:23 for the marathon (at Auckland, 30 October 2005) – New Zealand age-group record

60–64 age group

- 18:51.13 for the 5000 metres (at Wellington, 21 February 2010) – World age-group record
- 39:04.23 for the 10,000 metres (at Wellington, 28 February 2010) – World age-group record
- 1:24:56 for the half-marathon (at Christchurch, 6 June 2010) – World age-group record
- 3:01:30 for the marathon (at Gold Coast, Australia, 4 July 2010) – World age-group record

== Honours and awards ==
In 1994 and 1998, Portenski was named Wellington sports personality of the year. Also in 1998, she was named Wellingtonian of the Year, Kapiti Coast sports personality of the year, and New Zealand veteran athlete of the year.
