= List of Kenyan records in athletics =

The following are the national records in athletics in Kenya maintained by Athletics Kenya (AK).

== Outdoor ==
Key to tables: Awaiting ratification Record not kept by AK Not ratified or later rescinded by AK

=== Men ===
Event	Record	Athlete	Date	Meet	Place	Ref.	Video
100 m	9.77 A (+1.2 m/s)	Ferdinand Omanyala	18 September 2021	Kip Keino Classic	Nairobi, Kenya		
150 m (straight)	14.70 (−1.1 m/s)	Ferdinand Omanyala	17 May 2025	Adidas Games	Atlanta, United States		
200 m	20.14 (+1.9 m/s)	Carvin Nkanata	18 April 2015	NTC Pure Athletics Sprint Elite Meet	Clermont, United States		
300 m	33.43	Kennedy Ochieng	21 May 2000	Internationales Läufermeeting Pliezhausen	Pliezhausen, Germany		
400 m	44.18	Samson Kitur	3 August 1992	Olympic Games	Barcelona, Spain		
500 m	57.69 (Note: road race)	David Rudisha	10 September 2016	Great North CityGames	Newcastle, United Kingdom		
600 m	1:13.10	David Rudisha	5 June 2016	British Grand Prix	Birmingham, United Kingdom		
800 m	1:40.91	David Rudisha	9 August 2012	Olympic Games	London, United Kingdom		
1000 m	2:11.83	Emmanuel Wanyonyi	10 July 2026	Herculis	Fontvieille, Monaco		
1500 m	3:26.34	Bernard Lagat	24 August 2001	Memorial Van Damme	Brussels, Belgium		
Mile	3:43.40	Noah Ngeny	7 July 1999	Golden Gala	Rome, Italy		
Mile (road)	3:52.45	Emmanuel Wanyonyi	26 April 2025	Adizero: Road to Records	Herzogenaurach, Germany		
2000 m	4:48.14	Reynold Kipkorir Cheruiyot	8 September 2023	Memorial Van Damme	Brussels, Belgium		
3000 m	7:20.67	Daniel Komen	1 September 1996	IAAF Grand Prix	Rieti, Italy		
Two miles	7:58.61	Daniel Komen	19 July 1997		Hechtel-Eksel, Belgium		
5000 m	12:39.74	Daniel Komen	22 August 1997	Memorial Van Damme	Brussels, Belgium		
5 km (road)	12:55	Nicholas Kimeli	30 April 2022	Adizero Road to Records	Herzogenaurach, Germany		
8 km (road)	20:11+	Rhonex Kipruto	12 January 2020	10K Valencia Ibercaja	Valencia, Spain		
10,000 m	26:27.85	Paul Tergat	22 August 1997	Memorial Van Damme	Brussels, Belgium		
10 km (road)	26:24	Rhonex Kipruto	12 January 2020	10K Valencia Ibercaja	Valencia, Spain		
15,000 m (track)	41:51.64+	Sabastian Sawe	1 September 2022	Memorial Van Damme	Brussels, Belgium		
15 km (road)	40:49	Alex Matata	15 November 2026	Zevenheuvelenloop	Nijmegen, Netherlands		
10 miles (road)	44:04	Benard Koech	4 December 2022	Kosa 10-Miler	Kōsa, Japan		
20,000 m (track)	56:20.55	Sabastian Sawe	1 September 2022	Memorial Van Damme	Brussels, Belgium		
20 km (road)	54:43+ (Note: by official result source, 54:42 by World Athletics source)	Kibiwott Kandie	6 December 2020	Valencia Half Marathon	Valencia, Spain		
Half marathon	57:32	Kibiwott Kandie	6 December 2020	Valencia Half Marathon	Valencia, Spain		
One hour	21,250 m	Sabastian Sawe	2 September 2022	Memorial Van Damme	Brussels, Belgium		
25,000 m (track)	1:12:25.4+	Moses Mosop	3 June 2011	Prefontaine Classic	Eugene, United States		
25 km (road)	1:11:08+	Eliud Kipchoge	25 September 2022	Berlin Marathon	Berlin, Germany		
25 km (road)	1:10:59+	Eliud Kipchoge	12 October 2019	Ineos 1:59 Challenge	Vienna, Austria		
30,000 m (track)	1:26:47.4	Moses Mosop	3 June 2011	Prefontaine Classic	Eugene, United States		
30 km (road)	1:25:40+	Eliud Kipchoge	25 September 2022	Berlin Marathon	Berlin, Germany		
30 km (road)	1:25:11+	Eliud Kipchoge	12 October 2019	Ineos 1:59 Challenge	Vienna, Austria		
Marathon	1:59:30	Sabastian Sawe	26 April 2026	London Marathon	London, United Kingdom		
110 m hurdles	13.69 (−0.1 m/s)	Fatwell Kimaiyo	26 January 1974	Commonwealth Games	Christchurch, New Zealand		
400 m hurdles	47.78	Boniface Mucheru Tumuti	18 August 2016	Olympic Games	Rio de Janeiro, Brazil		
2000 m steeplechase	5:14.43	Julius Kariuki	21 August 1990	Palio Città della Quercia	Rovereto, Italy		
3000 m steeplechase	7:53.64	Brimin Kipruto	22 July 2011	Herculis	Fontvieille, Monaco		
High jump	2.30 m A	Mathieu Sawe	6 June 2018		Nairobi, Kenya		
High jump	2.30 m	Mathieu Sawe	3 August 2018	African Championships	Asaba, Nigeria		
Pole vault	4.60 m A	Kenneth Kirui	22 July 2000		Nairobi, Kenya		
Long jump	8.12 m (+0.2 m/s)	Jacob Katonon	14 September 1995		Johannesburg, South Africa		
Triple jump	17.12 m A (±0.0 m/s)	Jacob Katonon	19 June 1996		Nairobi, Kenya		
Shot put	18.19 m A	Robert Welikhe	6 October 1989		Nairobi, Kenya		
Discus throw	56.08 m A	James Nyambureti	23 July 1994		Nairobi, Kenya		
Hammer throw	62.57 m	Dominic Abunda	4 August 2018		Asaba, Nigeria		
Javelin throw	92.72 m	Julius Yego	26 August 2015	World Championships	Beijing, China		
Decathlon	7305 pts	Edwin Kimutai Too	5–6 March 2024	Trials for African Games	Nairobi, Kenya		
Decathlon	100m (wind) / Long jump (wind) / Shot put / High jump / 400m / 110m H (wind) / Discus / Pole vault / Javelin / 1500m; 10.84 (+0.5 m/s) / 7.89 m (+1.9 m/s) / 9.35 m / 1.95 m / 49.06 / 15.30 (−1.5 m/s) / / 4.40 m / 51.43 m / 4:40.64						
10,000 m walk (track)	39:08.6 h	David Kimutai	21 March 2009		Nyeri, Kenya		
20 km walk (road)	1:18:23 A	Samuel Gathimba	18 June 2021		Nairobi, Kenya		
20 km walk (road)	1:18.20 A (Note: Short course.)	David Kimutai	16 July 2011	Kenyan Championships	Nairobi, Kenya		
50 km walk (road)	4:25:24	William Sawe	30 September 1988	Olympic Games	Seoul, South Korea		
4 × 100 m relay	38.35	Kenya; Boniface Mweresa; Ferdinand Omanyala; Meshack Kitsubuli Babu; Steve Onyango Odhiambo	10 May 2025	World Relays	Guangzhou, China		
4 × 100 m relay	38.26 A	Kenya; Samwel Imeta; Bonface Mweresa; Steve Onyango; Ferdinand Omanyala	29 April 2023	Botswana Golden Grand Prix	Gaborone, Botswana		
4 × 200 m relay	1:22.35	Kenya; Stephen Barasa; Carvin Nkanata; Tony Kipruto Chirchir; Walter Michuki Moenga	24 May 2014	IAAF World Relays	Nassau, Bahamas		
4 × 400 m relay	2:59.29	Kenya; Kelvin Tonui; Zablon Ekwam; Boniface Onyari Mweresa; Kevin Kipkorir	11 May 2025	World Relays	Guangzhou, China		
Sprint medley relay (2,2,4,8)	3:16.21	Kenya; Mike Mokamba (200 m); Alfas Kishoyian (200 m); Collins Omae (400 m); Collin Kipruto (800 m)	27 April 2019	Penn Relays	Philadelphia, United States		
4 × 800 m relay	7:02.43	Kenya; Joseph Mwengi Mutua; William Yiampoy; Ismael Kombich; Wilfred Bungei	25 August 2006	Memorial Van Damme	Brussels, Belgium		
Distance medley relay	9:15.56	Elkanah Angwenyi 2:50.8 (1200m); Thomas Musembi 45.8 (400m); Alfred Kirwa Yego 1:46.2 (800m); Alex Kipchirchir 3:52.8 (1600 m)	29 April 2006	Penn Relays	Philadelphia, United States		
4 × 1500 m relay	14:22.22	Kenya; Collins Cheboi; Silas Kiplagat; James Kiplagat Magut; Asbel Kiprop	25 May 2014	IAAF World Relays	Nassau, Bahamas		
Ekiden relay	1:57:06	Kenya; Josephat Muchiri Ndambiri 13:24/ 5 km Martin Irungu Mathathi 27:12/ 10 km Daniel Muchunu Mwangi 13:59/ 5 km Mekubo Mogusu 27:56/ 10 km Onesmus Nyerre 14:36/ 5 km John Kariuki 19:59/ 7.195 km	23 November 2005	International Chiba Ekiden	Chiba, Japan		

=== Women ===
Event	Record	Athlete	Date	Meet	Place	Ref.	Video
100 m	11.19 A (+0.3 m/s)	Maximilla Imali	25 June 2022	Kenyan World Championships and Commonwealth Games Trials	Nairobi, Kenya		
200 m	23.12 A (−0.5 m/s)	Maximilla Imali	24 June 2022	Kenyan World Championships and Commonwealth Games Trials	Nairobi, Kenya		
200 m	22.4 h A NWI	Joy Nakhumicha Sakari	11 July 2015	Kenyan Championships	Kasarani, Kenya		
300 m	35.77 A	Mercy Oketch	28 April 2026	Simbine Classic	Pretoria, South Africa		
400 m	50.14 A	Mercy Oketch	31 May 2025	Kip Keino Classic	Nairobi, Kenya		
600 m	1:21.63	Mary Moraa	1 September 2024	ISTAF Berlin	Berlin, Germany		
800 m	1:54.01	Pamela Jelimo	29 August 2008	Weltklasse Zürich	Zürich, Switzerland		
1000 m	2:29.15	Faith Kipyegon	14 August 2020	Herculis	Fontvieille, Monaco		
1500 m	3:48.68	Faith Kipyegon	5 July 2025	Prefontaine Classic	Eugene, United States		
Mile	4:07.64	Faith Kipyegon	21 July 2023	Herculis	Fontvieille, Monaco		
Mile	4:06.42 (Note: Not record eligible due to the use of a team of pacemakers and custom gear.)	Faith Kipyegon	26 June 2025	Breaking4	Paris, France		
Mile (road)	4:22.54 Wo	Mirriam Cherop	8 December 2018	Honolulu Kalakaua Merrie Mile	Honolulu, United States		
2000 m	5:26.09	Edinah Jebitok	12 July 2024	Herculis	Fontvieille, Monaco		
3000 m	8:07.04	Faith Kipyegon	16 August 2025	Kamila Skolimowska Memorial	Chorzów, Poland		
Two miles	9:11.49	Mercy Cherono	24 August 2014	British Athletics Grand Prix	Birmingham, United Kingdom		
5000 m	13:58.06	Beatrice Chebet	5 July 2025	Prefontaine Classic	Eugene, United States		
5 km (road)	14:13 Wo	Beatrice Chebet	31 December 2023	Cursa dels Nassos	Barcelona, Spain		
5 km (road)	13:54 Mx	Beatrice Chebet	31 December 2024	Cursa dels Nassos	Barcelona, Spain		
4 miles (road)	19:14	Viola Kibiwot	13 October 2013	4 Mile of Groningen	Groningen, Netherlands		
8 km (road)	23:10+	Agnes Ngetich	14 January 2024	10K Valencia Ibercaja	Valencia, Spain		
10,000 m	28:54.14	Beatrice Chebet	25 May 2024	Prefontaine Classic	Eugene, United States		
10 km (road)	28:46 Mx	Agnes Ngetich	14 January 2024	10K Valencia Ibercaja	Valencia, Spain		
10 km (road)	29:27 Wo	Agnes Ngetich	26 April 2025	Adizero: Road to Records	Herzogenaurach, Germany		
10 km (road)	29:26 Wo	Agnes Ngetich	18 November 2023	Urban Trail de Lille	Lille, France		
10 km (road)	29:24 Wo (Note: Ngetich's mark was not certified after World Athletics determined the course was 25 meters too short.)	Agnes Ngetich	10 September 2023	Brașov Running Festival	Brașov, Romania		
15 km (road)	44:15+ Mx	Agnes Jebet Ngetich	27 October 2024	Valencia Half Marathon	Valencia, Spain		
15 km (road)	46:24+ Wo	Peres Jepchirchir	17 October 2020	World Half Marathon Championships	Gdynia, Poland		
10 miles (road)	49:49+ Mx	Ruth Chepng'etich	9 October 2022	Chicago Marathon	Chicago, United States		
10 miles (road)	49:21+ a	Brigid Kosgei	8 September 2019	Great North Run	Newcastle upon Tyne-South Shields, United Kingdom		
One hour	18341 m	Eva Cherono	4 September 2020	Memorial van Damme	Brussels, Belgium		
20,000 m (track)	1:05:26.6	Tegla Loroupe	3 September 2000		Borgholzhausen, Germany		
20 km (road)	59:42+ Mx	Agnes Jebet Ngetich	27 October 2024	Valencia Half Marathon	Valencia, Spain		
20 km (road)	1:01:56+ Wo	Agnes Ngetich	20 September 2026	World Road Running Championships	Copenhagen, Denmark		
Half marathon	1:03:04 Mx	Agnes Jebet Ngetich	27 October 2024	Valencia Half Marathon	Valencia, Spain		
Half marathon	1:05:15 Wo	Agnes Ngetich	20 September 2026	World Road Running Championships	Copenhagen, Denmark		
25,000 m (track)	1:27:05.84	Tegla Loroupe	21 September 2002		Mengerskirchen, Germany		
25 km (road)	1:16:17+ Mx	Ruth Chepngetich	13 October 2024	Chicago Marathon	Chicago, United States		
25 km (road)	1:18:48+ Wo	Hellen Obiri	26 April 2026	London Marathon	London, United Kingdom		
25 km (road)	1:18:48+ Wo	Joyciline Jepkosgei	26 April 2026	London Marathon	London, United Kingdom		
30,000 m (track)	1:45:50.00	Tegla Loroupe	6 June 2003		Warstein, Germany		
30 km (road)	1:31:49+ Mx	Ruth Chepngetich	13 October 2024	Chicago Marathon	Chicago, United States		
30 km (road)	1:35:21+ Wo	Joyciline Jepkosgei	26 April 2026	London Marathon	London, United Kingdom		
30 km (road)	1:35:21+ Wo	Hellen Obiri	26 April 2026	London Marathon	London, United Kingdom		
Marathon	2:09:56 Mx	Ruth Chepng'etich	13 October 2024	Chicago Marathon	Chicago, United States		
Marathon	2:15:53 Wo	Hellen Obiri	26 April 2026	London Marathon	London, United Kingdom		
50 km (road)	3:08:30	Shelmith Muriuki	6 March 2022	Nedbank #Runified 50 km	Gqeberha, South Africa		
100 m hurdles	13.99 A (+0.7 m/s)	Priscilla Tabuda	27 April 2022 (Note: by World Athletics Profile; 26 April 2022 by World Athletics statistic handbook)	Kenyan Championships	Kasarani, Kenya		
400 m hurdles	55.84	Francisca Koki	14 August 2014		Marrakesh, Morocco		
400 m hurdles	55.82 A X	Francisca Koki	11 July 2015	Kenyan Championships	Kasarani, Kenya		
Mile steeplechase	4:52.10	Celestine Jepkosgei Biwot	22 August 2025	Memorial Van Damme	Brussels, Belgium		
2000 m steeplechase	5:47.42	Beatrice Chepkoech	10 September 2023	Hanžeković Memorial	Zagreb, Croatia		
3000 m steeplechase	8:44.32	Beatrice Chepkoech	20 July 2018	Herculis	Fontvieille, Monaco		
High jump	1.75 m A	Caroline Cherotich	13 May 2014		Nairobi, Kenya		
High jump	1.75 m A	Zeddy Chesire	22 June 2023	Kenyan Championships	Nairobi, Kenya		
High jump	1.75 m A	Zeddy Chesire	5 January 2024	2nd AK Track & Field Weekend Meeting/AK Relay Series	Nairobi, Kenya		
Pole vault	3.20 m A	Caroline Cherotich	9–11 July 2015		Nairobi, Kenya		
Long jump	6.43 m A NWI	Maximila Imali	20 June 2019		Nairobi, Kenya		
Triple jump	13.05 m A NWI	Gloria Mulei	21 June 2019		Nairobi, Kenya		
Shot put	15.60 m A	Elizabeth Olaba	27 June 1987		Nairobi, Kenya		
Discus throw	50.84 m A	Rose Rakamba	4/5 May 2018		Mombasa, Kenya		
Discus throw	50.90 m	Roseline Nyanchama	21 March 2024	African Games	Accra, Ghana		
Hammer throw	60.80 m	Linda Oseso	26 May 2012	NCAA West Preliminary Round	Austin, United States		
Javelin throw	53.58 m	Cecilia Kiplangat	3 March 2007	Athletics Kenya Meeting	Kisumu, Kenya		
Heptathlon	5407 pts	Caroline Kola	22–23 August 1994	Commonwealth Games	Victoria, Canada		
Heptathlon	100m H (wind) / High jump / Shot put / 200m (wind) / Long jump (wind) / Javelin / 800m; 14.78 / 1.53 m / 12.84 m / 26.02 / 5.55 m / 41.50 m / 2:10.47						
10,000 m walk (track)	43:50.86	Emily Wamusyi Ngii	6 August 2022	Commonwealth Games	Birmingham, United Kingdom		
10 km walk (road)	48:46 A	Grace Wanjiru	17 April 2015		Nakuru, Kenya		
20 km walk (road)	1:30:43	Grace Wanjiru Njue	26 June 2016	African Championships	Durban, South Africa		
20 km walk (road)	1:28:15 A (Note: Short course)	Grace Wanjiru Njue	15 July 2011	Kenyan Championships	Nairobi, Kenya		
20 km walk (road)	1:30:40 A	Grace Wanjiru Njue	6 June 2018	Kenya Defence Forces Championships	Nairobi, Kenya		
35 km walk (road)							
50 km walk (road)	7:26:09	Irene Jeptoo-Kipchumba	12 December 2009		Putrajaya		
4 × 100 m relay	44.75	Kenya; Eunice Kadogo; Milicent Ndoro; Frasha Wangari; Maureen Nyatichi	15 September 2015	All-Africa Games	Brazzaville, Republic of the Congo		
4 × 200 m relay	1:38.26	Kenya; Joan Cherono; Doreen Waka; Maximila Imali; Monica Safania	2 May 2021	World Relays	Chorzów, Poland		
Sprint medley relay (1,1,2,4)	1:46.05	Kenya; Eunice Kadogo (100 m); Fresha Mwangi (100 m); Joan Cherono (200 m); Evengeline Makena (400 m)	27 April 2019	Penn Relays	Philadelphia, United States		
4 × 400 m relay	3:28.94 A	Kenya; Geraldine Shitandayi; Florence Wanjiru; Esther Kavaya; Francisca Chepkurui	12 August 1987	All-Africa Games	Nairobi, Kenya		
4 × 800 m relay	8:04.28	Kenya; Agatha Jeruto Kimaswai; Sylvia Chematui Chesebe; Janeth Jepkosgei; Eunice Jepkoech Sum	25 May 2014	IAAF World Relays	Nassau, Bahamas		
Distance medley relay	10:43.35	Kenya; Selah Jepleting Busienei (1200 m); Joy Nakhumicha Sakari (400 m); Sylivia Chematui Chesebe (800 m); Virginia Nyambura Nganga (1600 m)	2 May 2015	IAAF World Relays	Nassau, Bahamas		
4 × 1500 m relay	16:33.58	Kenya; Mercy Cherono; Faith Kipyegon; Irene Jelagat; Hellen Obiri	24 May 2014	2014 IAAF World Relays	Nassau, Bahamas		
Ekiden relay	2:13:35	Kenya; Philes Ongori; Everline Kimwei; Catherine Ndereba; Jane Wanjiku; Lucy Wangui Kabuu; Sally Chepyego Kaptich	23 November 2006	International Chiba Ekiden	Chiba, Japan		

=== Mixed ===
Event	Record	Athlete	Date	Meet	Place	Ref.
4 × 400 m relay	3:11.88 A	Kenya; Zablon Ekwam; Mary Moraa; Kelvin Sane Tauta; Mercy Chebet	15 June 2024	Kenyan Olympic Trials	Nairobi, Kenya	

== Indoor ==
=== Men ===
Event	Record	Athlete	Date	Meet	Place	Ref.
60 m	6.51	Ferdinand Omanyala	11 February 2024	Meeting de Paris	Paris, France	
200 m	20.85	Paulvince Obuon	6 March 2004		Allston, United States	
300 m	32.60 OT	Carvin Nkanata	7 December 2013	Kent State Golden Flash Gala	Kent, United States	
400 m	45.98	Charles Gitonga	19 February 1995	Meeting Pas de Calais	Liévin, France	
600 y	1:06.93	Moitalel Naadokila	15 February 2020		Lubbock, United States	
600 m	1:14.79 A	Michael Saruni	19 January 2018	Dr. Martin Luther King Collegiate Invitational	Albuquerque, United States	
800 m	1:43.98	Michael Saruni	9 February 2019	Millrose Games	New York City, United States	
1000 m	2:15.50	Kennedy Kimwetich	6 February 2000	Sparkassen Cup	Stuttgart, Germany	
1500 m	3:32.11	Laban Rotich	1 February 1998	Sparkassen Cup	Stuttgart, Germany	
Mile	3:49.44	Edward Cheserek	9 February 2018	David Hemery Valentine Invitational	Boston, United States	
2000 m	4:55.72	Shadrack Korir	17 February 2007	AVIVA Indoor Grand Prix	Birmingham, United Kingdom	
3000 m	7:24.90	Daniel Komen	6 February 1998		Budapest, Hungary	
Two miles	8:06.48	Paul Kipsiele Koech	16 February 2008	AVIVA Indoor Grand Prix	Birmingham, United Kingdom	
5000 m	12:51.48	Daniel Komen	19 February 1998	GE Galan	Stockholm, Sweden	
10,000 m	27:50.29	Mark Bett	10 February 2002	Indoor Flanders Meeting	Ghent, Belgium	
60 m hurdles	7.7 h	John Kiplangat Ngeno	31 January 1976		Portland, United States	
60 m hurdles	8.09	Lawrence Lokonobei	20 February 2021		Brookings, United States	
2000 m steeplechase	5:13.77 ^{[WB]}	Paul Kipsiele Koech	13 February 2011	Indoor Flanders Meeting	Ghent, Belgium	
High jump	2.27 m	Mathew Sawe	8 February 2020		Hustopeče, Czech Republic	
Pole vault						
Long jump	7.98 m A	Benjamin Koech	2 February 1993	Lumberjack Invitational	Flagstaff, United States	
Long jump	7.98 m A	Benjamin Koech	20 February 1994	Lumberjack Invitational	Flagstaff, United States	
Triple jump	16.70 m	Benjamin Koech	3 March 1990		Lawrence, United States	
Shot put						
Heptathlon						
Heptathlon	60m / Long jump / Shot put / High jump / 60m H / Pole vault / 1000m					
5000 m walk						
4 × 400 m relay	3:06.71	Kenya; Wiseman Mukhobe; Zablon Ekwam; Kelvin Tauta; Boniface Mweresa	3 March 2024	World Championships	Glasgow, United Kingdom	

=== Women ===
Event	Record	Athlete	Date	Meet	Place	Ref.
60 m	7.89	Ivy Atieno	15 January 2012		Leverkusen, Germany	
200 m	25.30	Joyce Odhiambo	6 March 1987	World Championships	Indianapolis, United States	
400 m	54.21	Ruth Waithera	10 March 1984		Syracuse, United States	
400 m	53.34 A OT	Ruth Waithera	3 March 1984		Flagstaff, United States	
400 m	51.25	Mercy Adongo Oketch	21 March 2026	World Championships	Toruń, Poland	
800 m	1:58.83	Pamela Jelimo	11 March 2012	World Championships	Istanbul, Turkey	
1000 m	2:37.26 OT	Dorcas Ewoi	27 January 2024	UW Invitational	Seattle, United States	
1500 m	4:02.09	Beatrice Chepkoech	4 February 2020	PSD Bank Meeting	Düsseldorf, Germany	
Mile	4:20.61	Susan Lokayo Ejore	11 February 2024	Millrose Games	New York City, United States	
2000 m	5:40.35	Sally Kipyego	7 February 2015	New Balance Indoor Grand Prix	Boston, United States	
3000 m	8:29.41	Hellen Obiri	18 February 2017	Birmingham Indoor Grand Prix	Birmingham, United Kingdom	
3000 m	8:22.68	Beatrice Chepkoech	2 March 2024	World Championships	Glasgow, United Kingdom	
Two miles	9:12.35	Vivian Cheruiyot	20 February 2010	Aviva Indoor Grand Prix	Birmingham, United Kingdom	
5000 m	14:51.21	Doris Lemngole	14 February 2026	BU David Hemery Valentine Invitational	Boston, United States	
60 m hurdles						
High jump	1.50 m	Ananda Maende	16 December 2018		Orléans, France	
High jump	1.50 m	Ananda Maende	20 January 2019		Orléans, France	
Pole vault						
Long jump	6.16 m A	Esther Otieno	22 February 1980		Pocatello, United States	
Triple jump						
Shot put	14.41 m	Linda Oseso	29 January 2011	UW Invitational	Seattle, United States	
Weight throw	18.02 m	Linda Oseso	25 February 2011	MPSF Indoor Track & Field Championships	Seattle, United States	
Pentathlon						
Pentathlon	60m H / High jump / Shot put / Long jump / 800m					
3000 m walk						
4 × 400 m relay						

== U20 (Junior) records ==
=== Men outdoor ===
Event	Record	Athlete	Date	Meet	Place	Age	Ref.
100 m	10.23 A (+0.8 m/s)	Mike Nyang'au	11 July 2015	Kenyan Championships	Nairobi, Kenya	18 years, 317 days	
100 m	9.9 h A NWI	Mike Nyang'au	1 August 2015	Kenyan World Championship Trials	Nairobi, Kenya	18 years, 338 days	
200 m	20.48 A (+1.8 m/s)	Mike Nyangau	1 Aug 2015	Kenyan World Championship Trials	Nairobi, Kenya	18 years, 338 days	
200 m	20.2h A	Mike Nyangau	11 Jul 2015	Kenyan Athletics Championships	Nairobi, Kenya	18 years, 317 days	
400 m	45.22 A	Alex Sampao	11 Jul 2015	National Championships	Nairobi, Kenya	18 years, 192 days	
600 m	1:14.94	Wilfred Bungei	1 Sep 1999		Bellinzona, Switzerland	19 years, 39 days	
800 m	1:42.53	Timothy Kitum	9 Aug 2012	30th Olympic Games	London, United Kingdom	17 years, 263 days	
1000 m	2:15.00	Benjamin Kipkurui	17 Jul 1999		Nice, France	18 years, 211 days	
1500 m	3:27.72	Phanuel Koech	20 Jun 2025	Meeting de Paris	Paris, France	18 years, 201 days	
Mile run	3:48.06	Reynold Cheruiyot	16 Sep 2023	Prefontaine Classic, Wanda Diamond League Final	Eugene, United States	19 years, 48 days	
2000 m	4:48.14	Reynold Cheruiyot	8 Sep 2023	47th Memorial van Damme	Brussels, Belgium	19 years, 40 days	
3000 m	7:28.28	Emmanuel Kiprono	7 Aug 2026	World U20 Championships	Eugene, United States	17 years, 225 days	
Two miles	8:09.23	Ishmael Kipkurui	9 Jun 2023	Meeting de Paris	Paris, France	18 years, 119 days	
5000 m	12:48.64	Isiah Koech	6 Jul 2012	Meeting Areva, Samsung Diamond League, Stade-de-France	Paris, France	18 years, 200 days	
10,000 m	26:41.75	Samuel Wanjiru	26 Aug 2005	Van Damme Memorial	Brussels, Belgium	18 years, 289 days	
10 km (road)	27:08	Rhonex Kipruto	29 Apr 2018	New York Healthy Kidney 10K	New York, United States	18 years, 199 days	
Half marathon	59:16	Samuel Wanjiru	11 Sep 2005	2nd Fortis Rotterdam Half-Marathon	Rotterdam, Netherlands	18 years, 305 days	
Marathon	2:06:07	Erick Leon Ndiema	16 Oct 2011		Amsterdam, Netherlands	18 years, 292 days	
2000 m steeplechase	5:20.44	Ronald Rutto	13 May 2005	Doha Qatar Athletic Super Grand Prix	Doha, Qatar	17 years, 217 days	
3000 m steeplechase	7:58.66	Saif Saeed Shaheen	24 Aug 2001		Brussels, Belgium	18 years, 313 days	
110 m hurdles	14.22A	Kipkorir Rotich	10 Jun 2017	National Championships, Nyayo Stadium	Nairobi, Kenya	18–19 years	
400 m hurdles	49.33A	Joseph Maritim	9 Aug 1987		Nairobi, Kenya	18 years, 291 days	
High jump	2.06A	Sid Markurs	21 Aug 2021	18th World Athletics U20 Championships	Nairobi, Kenya	18 years, 324 days	
Long jump	7.75A	Bethwell Kibet	28 May 2016		Nairobi, Kenya	17–18 years	
Triple jump	16.21A	Benjamin Koech	18 Jun 1988		Nairobi, Kenya	18	
Triple jump	16.42A NWI	Kevin Kemboi	25 Apr 2025	5th AK Track & Field Weekend Meeting/Relay Series	Nairobi, Kenya	19	
Javelin throw	75.56A	Alex Kiprotich	13 Aug 2013	African Junior Championships Trials, Nyayo Stadium	Nairobi, Kenya	18 years, 307 days	
10,000 m walk (track)	40:37.54	Stephen Ndangiri Kihu	30 August 2024	World U20 Championships	Lima, Peru	18 years, 260 days	
20 km walk (road)	1:24:44A	Heristone Wanyonyi	26 Apr 2022	Kenyan Championships	Nairobi, Kenya	18 years, 300 days	
4 × 400 m relay	3:05.54	Kenya	20 Aug 2006	11th IAAF World Junior Championships	Beijing, China		

=== Women outdoor ===
Event	Record	Athlete	Date	Meet	Place	Country	Age	Ref.
100 m	12.17 A	Annet Mwanzi	18 Jun 2005	National Championships, Moi International Sports Centre, Kasarani	Nairobi, Kenya	17 years, 332 days		
200 m	23.73 A	Damaris Ndeleva	23 Jun 2023	National Championships	Nairobi, Kenya	17 years, 175 days		
200 m	23.5 h A NWI	Maureen Nyatichi Thomas	11 Jul 2015	National Championships	Nairobi, Kenya	17 years, 194 days		
400 m	51.71	Damaris Ndeleva	4 Aug 2022	World Athletics U20 Championships	Cali, Colombia	16 years, 217 days		
800 m	1:54.01	Pamela Jelimo	29 Aug 2008	21st Weltklasse Zürich	Zürich, Switzerland	18 years, 268 days		
1000 m	2:37.98	Janeth Jepkosgei	28 Aug 2002		Rovereto, Italy	18 years, 258 days		
1500 m	3:56.98	Faith Kipyegon	10 May 2013	IAAF Diamond League Meeting	Doha, Qatar	19 years, 120 days		
Mile run	4:28.97	Faith Cherotich	11 Sep 2022	72nd Memorial Boris Hanžeković	Zagreb, Croatia	18 years, 57 days		
2000 m	5:35.65	Mercy Cherono	4 Sep 2009	33rd Memorial Van Damme	Brussels, Belgium	18 years, 120 days		
3000 m	8:35.89	Sally Barsosio	16 Aug 1997		Monaco	19 years, 148 days		
Two miles	9:49.74	Gladys Ondeyo	20 Jul 1993	36th Paavo Nurmi Games, Turku Sports Park Stadium	Turku, Finland	18 years, 71 days		
5000 m	14:45.98	Pauline Korikwiang	2 Jun 2006	Bislett Games	Oslo, Norway	18 years, 93 days		
10,000 m	30:26.50	Linet Masai	15 Aug 2008	29th Olympic Games	Beijing, China	18 years, 254 days		
10 km (road)	31:11	Agnes Mwikali Mutuku	19 Dec 2021	Sanyo Ladies Road Race	Okayama, Japan	19 years, 4 days		
Half marathon	1:07:05	Phena Yego Siyoi	14 Sep 2025	Copenhagen Half Marathon	Copenhagen, Denmark	19 years, 83 days		
Marathon	2:25:32	Jane Nyaboke	7 Nov 2021	Zurich Marato Barcelona	Barcelona, Spain	19 years, 218 days		
2000 m steeplechase	6:07.01	Fancy Cherono	1 Sep 2019	ISTAF Berlin	Berlin, Germany	18 years, 30 days		
3000 m steeplechase	8:58.78	Celliphine Chespol	26 May 2017	Prefontaine Classic	Eugene, United States	18 years, 64 days		
400 m hurdles	56.95	Vanice Nyagisera	30 Aug 2019	12th All Africa Games	Rabat, Morocco	18 years, 148 days		
High jump	1.71 m A	Zeddy Chesire	23 Feb 2020		Eldoret, Kenya	16 years, 134 days		
Long jump	6.20 m A	Winnie Chepngetich Bii	1 Jul 2022	Kenyan Trials For World Under 20 Championships	Nairobi	Kenya	18 years, 186 days	
Triple jump	13.05 m A	Gloria Mulei	20 Jun 2019	Kenya National Championship, Kasarani Stadium	Nairobi	Kenya	18 years, 265 days	
Shot put	13.48 m A	Belinda Oburu	20 Jun 2019	Kenya National Championship, Kasarani Stadium	Nairobi	Kenya	18 years, 253 days	
Javelin throw	52.91 m A	Irene Jepkemboi	23 Jun 2023	National Championships	Nairobi	Kenya	19 years, 110 days	
20 km walk (road)	1:52:53	Veronica Nyaruai	19 Jul 2007	9th All Africa Games, Stade 5 juillet	Alger	Algeria	17 years, 263 days	

=== Men indoor ===
Event	Record	Athlete	Date	Meet	Place	Country	Age	Ref.
60 m	6.92	Moffat Wanjiru	3 Feb 2017	Armory Track Invitational, Armory Track & Field Center	New York City, United States	18 years, 301 days		
400 m	46.32	Moitalel Mpoke	24 Jan 2020	Red Raider Invitational	Lubbock, United States	18 years, 350 days		
600 m	1:16.43	Timothy Kitum	3 Feb 2013	Russian Winter	Moscow, Russia	18 years, 75 days		
800 m	1:44.98	Noah Kibet	11 Feb 2023	115th Millrose Games	New York City, United States	18 years, 305 days		
1000 m	2:17.96	Sylas Kimutai	20 Feb 2002		Piraeus, Greece	18 years, 131 days		
1500 m	3:36.37	Michael Too	3 Feb 2002		Stuttgart, Germany	18 years, 184 days		
Mile run	3:54.78	Brian Muange Musau	1 Feb 2025	Razorback Invitational	Fayetteville, United States	18 years, 34 days		
2000 m	4:59.02	Remmy Limo	17 Feb 2007		Birmingham, United Kingdom	19 years, 14 days		
3000 m	7:32.89	Isiah Kiplangat Koech	14 Feb 2012	Meeting du Pas-de-Calais	Liévin, France	18 years, 57 days		
Two miles	8:39.15	Edward Cheserek	16 Feb 2013	106th Millrose Games, The Armory Track and Field Center	New York City, United States	19 years, 14 days		
5000 m	12:53.29	Isiah Koech	11 Feb 2011	PSD Bank Meeting, Arena-Sportpark	Düsseldorf, Germany	17 years, 54 days		

=== Women indoor ===
Event	Record	Athlete	Date	Meet	Place	Age	Ref.
400 m	55.23	Sylvia Chelangat	3 Feb 2023	South Carolina Invitational	Columbia, United States	18 years, 304 days	
800 m	2:07.26	Sylvia Chelangat	11 Feb 2023	Tiger Paw Invite	Clemson, United States	18 years, 312 days	
1500 m	4:11.75	Irene Jelagat	20 Feb 2007		Stockholm, Sweden	18 years, 72 days	
Mile	4:33.60	Mary Nyaboke Ogwoka	26 Feb 2026	Southeastern Conference Indoor Track & Field Championship	College Station, United States	18 years, 213 days	
3000 m	9:03.59	Veronica Nyaruai	9 Feb 2008		Valencia, Spain	18 years, 103 days	
5000 m	15:12.57	Judy Chepkoech	6 Dec 2025	Boston University Sharon Colyear-Danville Season Opener	Boston, United States	18 years, 100 days	

== See also ==
- Kenya national athletics team
