= List of African records in athletics =

African records in athletics are the best marks set in track and field and road running events by an athlete who competes for a member nation of the Confederation of African Athletics (CAA). The organisation is responsible for ratification and analyses each record before approving it. Records may be set in any continent and at any competition, providing the correct measures (such as wind-gauges) to allow for a verifiable and legal mark.

== Outdoor ==
Key to tables: Awaiting ratification Record not kept by CAA Not ratified or later rescinded by CAA

=== Men ===
Event	Record	Athlete	Nationality	Date	Meet	Place	Ref.	Video
100 y	9.40 NWI	Kofi Okyir	Ghana	12 April 1974		Austin, United States		
100 m	9.77 A (+1.2 m/s)	Ferdinand Omanyala	Kenya	18 September 2021	Kip Keino Classic	Nairobi, Kenya		
150 m (straight)	14.70 (−1.1 m/s)	Ferdinand Omanyala	Kenya	17 May 2025	Adidas Games	Atlanta, United States		
150 m (bend)	14.99+ (+0.3 m/s)	Frankie Fredericks	Namibia	20 August 1993	World Championships	Stuttgart, Germany		
200 m	19.46 (+0.4 m/s)	Letsile Tebogo	Botswana	8 July 2024	Olympic Games	Saint-Denis, France		
200 m straight	19.84 (+0.6 m/s)	Wayde van Niekerk	South Africa	4 June 2017	Boost Boston Games	Boston, United States		
300 m	30.69 A	Letsile Tebogo	Botswana	17 February 2024	Simbine Curro Classic Shoot-Out	Pretoria, South Africa		
400 m	43.03	Wayde van Niekerk	South Africa	14 August 2016	Olympic Games	Rio de Janeiro, Brazil		
500 m (road)	57.69	David Rudisha	Kenya	10 September 2016	Great North CityGames	Newcastle, United Kingdom		
600 m	1:13.10	David Rudisha	Kenya	5 June 2016	British Grand Prix	Birmingham, United Kingdom		
800 m	1:40.91	David Rudisha	Kenya	9 August 2012	Olympic Games	London, United Kingdom		
1000 m	2:11.83	Emmanuel Wanyonyi	Kenya	10 July 2026	Herculis	Fontvieille, Monaco		
1500 m	3:26.00	Hicham El Guerrouj	Morocco	14 July 1998	Golden Gala	Rome, Italy		
Mile	3:43.13	Hicham El Guerrouj	Morocco	7 July 1999	Golden Gala	Rome, Italy		
Mile (road)	3:52.45	Emmanuel Wanyonyi	Kenya	26 April 2025	Adizero: Road to Records	Herzogenaurach, Germany		
2000 m	4:44.79	Hicham El Guerrouj	Morocco	7 September 1999	ISTAF	Berlin, Germany		
3000 m	7:20.67	Daniel Komen	Kenya	1 September 1996	IAAF Grand Prix	Rieti, Italy		
Two miles	7:58.61	Daniel Komen	Kenya	19 July 1997		Hechtel-Eksel, Belgium		
5000 m	12:35.36	Joshua Cheptegei	Uganda	14 August 2020	Herculis	Fontvieille, Monaco		
5 km (road)	12:49	Berihu Aregawi	Ethiopia	31 December 2021	Cursa dels Nassos	Barcelona, Spain		
10,000 m	26:11.00	Joshua Cheptegei	Uganda	7 October 2020		Valencia, Spain		
10 km (road)	26:24	Rhonex Kipruto	Kenya	12 January 2020	10K Valencia Ibercaja	Valencia, Spain		
15,000 m (track)	41:51.64+	Sabastian Sawe	Kenya	1 September 2022	Memorial Van Damme	Brussels, Belgium		
15 km (road)	40:27+	Jacob Kiplimo	Uganda	21 November 2021	Lisbon Half Marathon	Lisbon, Portugal		
15 km (road)	40:07+ (Note: Race conditions not in compliance with World Athletics rules, due to drafting issues)	Jacob Kiplimo	Uganda	16 February 2025	Barcelona Half Marathon	Barcelona, Spain		
10 miles (road)	44:04	Benard Koech	Kenya	4 December 2022	Kosa 10-Miler	Kōsa, Japan		
20,000 m (track)	56:20.55	Sabastian Sawe	Kenya	1 September 2022	Memorial Van Damme	Brussels, Belgium		
20 km (road)	54:02+	Yomif Kejelcha	Ethiopia	23 August 2026	21K Buenos Aires	Buenos Aires, Argentina		
20 km (road)	53:42+ (Note: Race conditions not in compliance with World Athletics rules, due to drafting issues)	Jacob Kiplimo	Uganda	16 February 2025	Barcelona Half Marathon	Barcelona, Spain		
Half marathon	57:30	Yomif Kejelcha	Ethiopia	27 October 2024	Valencia Half Marathon	Valencia, Spain		
Half marathon	57:20	Jacob Kiplimo	Uganda	8 March 2026	Lisbon Half Marathon	Lisbon, Portugal		
Half marathon	56:51	Yomif Kejelcha	Ethiopia	23 August 2026	21K Buenos Aires	Buenos Aires, Argentina		
Half marathon	56:42 (Note: Race conditions not in compliance with World Athletics rules, due to drafting issues)	Jacob Kiplimo	Uganda	16 February 2025	Barcelona Half Marathon	Barcelona, Spain		
One hour (track)	21285 m	Haile Gebrselassie	Ethiopia	27 June 2007	Golden Spike Ostrava	Ostrava, Czech Republic		
25,000 m (track)	1:12:25.4+	Moses Mosop	Kenya	3 June 2011	Prefontaine Classic	Eugene, United States		
25 km (road)	1:11:08+	Eliud Kipchoge	Kenya	25 September 2022	Berlin Marathon	Berlin, Germany		
25 km (road)	1:10:59+ (Note: time trial with shifts of pacemakers and mobile drink deliveries)	Eliud Kipchoge	Kenya	12 October 2019	Ineos 1:59 Challenge	Vienna, Austria		
30,000 m (track)	1:26:47.4	Moses Mosop	Kenya	3 June 2011	Prefontaine Classic	Eugene, United States		
30 km (road)	1:25:31+	Jacob Kiplimo	Uganda	12 October 2025	Chicago Marathon	Chicago, United States		
30 km (road)	1:25:11+ (Note: time trial with shifts of pacemakers and mobile drink deliveries)	Eliud Kipchoge	Kenya	12 October 2019	Ineos 1:59 Challenge	Vienna, Austria		
Marathon	1:59:30	Sabastian Sawe	Kenya	26 April 2026	London Marathon	London, United Kingdom		
50 km (road)	2:39:04	Tete Dijana	South Africa	26 February 2023	Nedbank Runified Breaking Barriers 50 km	Gqeberha, South Africa		
100 km (road)	6:24:06	Bongmusa Mthembu	South Africa	27 November 2016		Los Alcázares, Spain		
100 km (road)	5:59:20# (Note: Non-ratifiable as the athlete ran behind a car, wore unratified prototype shoes, and was paced by rotating pacemakers)	Sibusiso Kubheka	South Africa	26 August 2025	Chasing 100	Nardò Ring, Italy		
110 m hurdles	13.11 (+1.8 m/s)	Antonio Alkana	South Africa	5 June 2017	Josef Odložil Memorial	Prague, Czech Republic		
200 m hurdles (straight)	22.10 (+1.8 m/s)	L. J. van Zyl	South Africa	9 May 2015	Manchester City Games	Manchester, United Kingdom		
200 m hurdles (bend)	22.6 h OT	Hendrik Serfontein	South Africa	23 March 1967		Bloemfontein, South Africa		
300 m hurdles	34.34	Sabelo Dhlamini	South Africa	26 August 2025	International Meeting	Maribor, Slovenia		
400 m hurdles	47.10	Samuel Matete	Zambia	7 August 1991	Weltklasse Zürich	Zürich, Switzerland		
2000 m steeplechase	5:14.06	Soufiane El Bakkali	Morocco	11 September 2022	Hanžeković Memorial	Zagreb, Croatia		
3000 m steeplechase	7:52.11	Lamecha Girma	Ethiopia	9 June 2023	Meeting de Paris	Paris, France		
High jump	2.38 m	Jacques Freitag	South Africa	5 March 2005		Oudtshoorn, South Africa		
Pole vault	6.03 m	Okkert Brits	South Africa	18 August 1995		Cologne, Germany		
Long jump	8.65 m A (+1.3 m/s)	Luvo Manyonga	South Africa	22 April 2017	South African Championships	Potchefstroom, South Africa		
Triple jump	17.82 m (+0.2 m/s) (Note: outdoor best; indoor mark ratified as absolute record)	Hugues Fabrice Zango	Burkina Faso	6 July 2021	Gyulai István Memorial	Székesfehérvár, Hungary		
Shot put	22.10 m	Chukwuebuka Enekwechi	Nigeria	5 July 2025	Prefontaine Classic	Eugene, United States		
Discus throw	70.32 m	Frantz Kruger	South Africa	26 May 2002		Salon-de-Provence, France		
Hammer throw	81.27 m	Mostafa Al-Gamel	Egypt	21 March 2014		Cairo, Egypt		
Javelin throw	92.72 m	Julius Yego	Kenya	26 August 2015	World Championships	Beijing, China		
Decathlon	8521 pts	Larbi Bourrada	Algeria	17–18 August 2016	Olympic Games	Rio de Janeiro, Brazil		
Decathlon	100m (wind) / Long jump (wind) / Shot put / High jump / 400m / 110m H (wind) / Discus / Pole vault / Javelin / 1500m; 10.75 (−0.4 m/s) / 7.52 m (+0.4 m/s) / 13.78 m / 2.10 m / 47.98 / 14.15 (+0.4 m/s) / 42.39 m / 4.60 m / 66.49 m / 4:14.60							
3000 m walk (track)	10:47.08	Lebogang Shange	South Africa	21 July 2018	Diamond League	London, United Kingdom		
5000 m walk (track)	18:05.49	Hatem Ghoula	Tunisia	1 May 1997		Tunis, Tunisia		
10,000 m walk (track)	38:04.09 A	Misgana Wakuma	Ethiopia	28 March 2026	Ethiopian Championships	Addis Ababa, Ethiopia		
10 km walk (road)	38:12	Hatem Ghoula	Tunisia	28 May 2000		Sesto San Giovanni, Italy		
20,000 m walk (track)	1:22:51.84	Hatem Ghoula	Tunisia	8 September 1994		Leutkirch, Germany		
20 km walk (road)	1:18:23 A	Samuel Gathimba	Kenya	18 June 2021		Nairobi, Kenya		
30,000 m walk (track)	2:19:21.4	Hatem Ghoula	Tunisia	12 March 2011		Reims, France		
35 km walk (road)	2:31:15	Wayne Snyman	South Africa	24 July 2022	World Championships	Eugene, United States		
50,000 m walk (track)	4:21:44.5	Abdelouaheb Ferguène	Algeria	25 March 1984		Toulouse, France		
50 km walk (road)	3:53:09 (Note: by official result source;3:35:09 by CAA source, a typo)	Marc Mundell	South Africa	20 March 2021	Dudinská Päťdesiatka	Dudince, Slovakia		
4 × 100 m relay	37.49	Mvuyo Moss; Cheswill Johnson; Bradley Nkoana; Akani Simbine	South Africa	3 May 2026	World Relays	Gaborene, Botswana		
4 × 200 m relay	1:20.42	Simon Magakwe; Chederick van Wyk; Sinesipho Dambile; Akani Simbine	South Africa	12 May 2019	IAAF World Relays	Yokohama, Japan		
4 × 400 m relay	2:54.47	Lee Eppie; Letsile Tebogo; Bayapo Ndori; Collen Kebinatshipi	Botswana	3 May 2026	World Relays	Gaborene, Botswana		
Sprint medley relay (2,2,4,8)	3:16.21	Mike Mokamba (200 m); Alfas Kishoyian (200 m); Collins Omae (400 m); Collin Kipruto (800 m)	Kenya	27 April 2019	Penn Relays	Philadelphia, United States		
4 × 800 m relay	7:02.43	Joseph Mwengi Mutua; William Yiampoy; Ismael Kipngetich Kombich; Wilfred Bungei	Kenya	25 August 2006	Memorial Van Damme	Brussels, Belgium		
Distance medley relay	9:15.56	Elkanah Angwenyi 2:50.8 (1200m); Thomas Musembi 45.8 (400m); Alfred Kirwa Yego 1:46.2 (800m); Alex Kipchirchir 3:52.8 (1600 m)	Kenya	29 April 2006	Penn Relays	Philadelphia, United States		
4 × 1500 m relay	14:22.22	Collins Cheboi; Silas Kiplagat; James Kiplagat Magut; Asbel Kiprop	Kenya	25 May 2014	IAAF World Relays	Nassau, Bahamas		
Ekiden relay	1:57:06	Josephat Muchiri Ndambiri 13:24/ 5 km Martin Irungu Mathathi 27:12/ 10 km Daniel Muchunu Mwangi 13:59/ 5 km Mekubo Mogusu 27:56/ 10 km Onesmus Nyerere 14:36/ 5 km John Kariuki 19:59/ 7.195 km	Kenya	23 November 2005	Chiba Ekiden	Chiba, Japan		

=== Women ===
Event	Record	Athlete	Nationality	Date	Meet	Place	Ref.	Video
100 y	10.30+ (+1.1 m/s)	Ruddy Zang Milama	Gabon	31 May 2011	Golden Spike Ostrava	Ostrava, Czech Republic		
100 m	10.72 (+0.4 m/s)	Marie-Josee Ta Lou	Ivory Coast	10 August 2022	Herculis	Fontvieille, Monaco		
150 m (straight)	15.85 (+2.0 m/s)	Favour Ofili	Nigeria	17 May 2025	Adidas Games	Atlanta, United States		
150 m (bend)	16.99 (+0.6 m/s)	Marie Josée Ta Lou	Ivory Coast	8 September 2020	Golden Spike Ostrava	Ostrava, Czech Republic		
200 m	21.78 (+0.6 m/s)	Christine Mboma	Namibia	9 September 2021	Weltklasse Zürich	Zürich, Switzerland		
300 m	34.60 A	Beatrice Masilingi	Namibia	18 February 2023	Curro Simbine Classic Shoot Out	Pretoria, South Africa		
400 m	49.10	Falilat Ogunkoya	Nigeria	29 July 1996	Olympic Games	Atlanta, United States		
400 m	48.54 (Note: mark was unratified because organisers did not arrange for doping control)	Christine Mboma	Namibia	30 June 2021	Irena Szewińska Memorial	Bydgoszcz, Poland		
600 m	1:21.63	Mary Moraa	Kenya	1 September 2024	ISTAF Berlin	Berlin, Germany		
800 m	1:54.01	Pamela Jelimo	Kenya	29 August 2008	Weltklasse Zürich	Zürich, Switzerland		
1000 m	2:29.15	Faith Kipyegon	Kenya	14 August 2020	Herculis	Fontvieille, Monaco		
1500 m	3:48.68	Faith Kipyegon	Kenya	5 July 2025	Prefontaine Classic	Eugene, United States		
Mile	4:07.64	Faith Kipyegon	Kenya	21 July 2023	Herculis	Fontvieille, Monaco		
Mile	4:06.42 (Note: Not record eligible due to the use of a team of pacemakers and custom gear.)	Faith Kipyegon	Kenya	26 June 2025	Breaking4	Paris, France		
Mile (road)	4:20.98 Wo	Diribe Welteji	Ethiopia	1 October 2023	World Road Running Championships	Riga, Latvia		
2000 m	5:21.56	Francine Niyonsaba	Burundi	14 September 2021	Hanžeković Memorial	Zagreb, Croatia		
3000 m	8:07.04	Faith Kipyegon	Kenya	16 August 2025	Kamila Skolimowska Memorial	Chorzów, Poland		
Two miles	8:58.58	Meseret Defar	Ethiopia	14 September 2007	Memorial Van Damme	Brussels, Belgium		
5000 m	13:58.06	Beatrice Chebet	Kenya	5 July 2025	Prefontaine Classic	Eugene, United States		
5 km (road)	14:13 Wo	Beatrice Chebet	Kenya	31 December 2023	Cursa dels Nassos	Barcelona, Spain		
5 km (road)	13:54 Mx	Beatrice Chebet	Kenya	31 December 2024	Cursa dels Nassos	Barcelona, Spain		
4 miles (road)	19:14	Viola Kibiwot	Kenya	13 October 2013	4 Mile of Groningen	Groningen, Netherlands		
10,000 m	28:54.14	Beatrice Chebet	Kenya	25 May 2024	Prefontaine Classic	Eugene, United States		
10 km (road)	29:27 Wo	Agnes Ngetich	Kenya	26 April 2025	Adizero: Road to Records	Herzogenaurach, Germany		
10 km (road)	29:26 Wo	Agnes Ngetich	Kenya	18 November 2023	Urban Trail de Lille	Lille, France		
10 km (road)	29:24 Wo (Note: Ngetich's mark was not certified after World Athletics determined the course was 25 meters too short.)	Agnes Ngetich	Kenya	10 September 2023	Brașov Running Festival	Brașov, Romania		
10 km (road)	28:46 Mx	Agnes Ngetich	Kenya	14 January 2024	10K Valencia Ibercaja	Valencia, Spain		
15 km (road)	44:15+ Mx	Agnes Jebet Ngetich	Kenya	27 October 2024	Valencia Half Marathon	Valencia, Spain		
15 km (road)	44:20 Mx	Letesenbet Gidey	Ethiopia	17 November 2019	Zevenheuvelenloop	Nijmegen, Netherlands		
15 km (road)	46:24+ Wo	Peres Jepchirchir	Kenya	17 October 2020	World Half Marathon Championships	Gdynia, Poland		
10 miles (road)	49:21+ Mx	Tsigie Gebreselama	Ethiopia	11 January 2026	Houston Half Marathon	Houston, United States		
10 miles (road)	49:21+ Mx	Fentaye Belayneh	Ethiopia	11 January 2026	Houston Half Marathon	Houston, United States		
10 miles (road)	49:21+ a	Brigid Kosgei	Kenya	8 September 2019	Great North Run	Newcastle upon Tyne-South Shields, United Kingdom		
One hour (track)	18517 m	Dire Tune	Ethiopia	12 June 2008	Golden Spike Ostrava	Ostrava, Czech Republic		
20,000 m (track)	1:05:26.6	Tegla Loroupe	Kenya	3 September 2000		Borgholzhausen, Germany		
20 km (road)	59:35 Mx+	Letesenbet Gidey	Ethiopia	24 October 2021	Valencia Half Marathon	Valencia, Spain		
20 km (road)	1:01:56+ Wo	Agnes Ngetich	Kenya	20 September 2026	World Road Running Championships	Copenhagen, Denmark		
Half marathon	1:02:52 Mx	Letesenbet Gidey	Ethiopia	24 October 2021	Valencia Half Marathon	Valencia, Spain		
Half marathon	1:05:15 Wo	Agnes Ngetich	Kenya	20 September 2026	World Road Running Championships	Copenhagen, Denmark		
25,000 m (track)	1:27:05.9	Tegla Loroupe	Kenya	21 September 2002		Mengerskirchen, Germany		
25 km (road)	1:16:17+ Mx	Ruth Chepngetich	Kenya	13 October 2024	Chicago Marathon	Chicago, United States		
25 km (road)	1:18:48+ Wo	Hellen Obiri	Kenya	26 April 2026	London Marathon	London, United Kingdom		
25 km (road)	1:18:48+ Wo	Joyciline Jepkosgei	Kenya	26 April 2026	London Marathon	London, United Kingdom		
25 km (road)	1:18:48+ Wo	Tigst Assefa	Ethiopia	26 April 2026	London Marathon	London, United Kingdom		
30,000 m (track)	1:45:50.0	Tegla Loroupe	Kenya	6 June 2003		Warstein, Germany		
30 km (road)	1:31:49+ Mx	Ruth Chepngetich	Kenya	13 October 2024	Chicago Marathon	Chicago, United States		
30 km (road)	1:35:21+ Wo	Tigst Assefa	Ethiopia	26 April 2026	London Marathon	London, United Kingdom		
30 km (road)	1:35:21+ Wo	Joyciline Jepkosgei	Kenya	26 April 2026	London Marathon	London, United Kingdom		
30 km (road)	1:35:21+ Wo	Hellen Obiri	Kenya	26 April 2026	London Marathon	London, United Kingdom		
Marathon	2:09:56 Mx	Ruth Chepng'etich	Kenya	13 October 2024	Chicago Marathon	Chicago, United States		
Marathon	2:15:41 Wo	Tigst Assefa	Ethiopia	26 April 2026	London Marathon	London, United Kingdom		
50 km (road)	3:00:29 Wo (Note: by World Athletics source; 3:00:30 by CAA source)	Emane Seifu Hayile	Ethiopia	26 February 2023	Nedbank Runified Breaking Barriers 50 km	Gqeberha, South Africa		
100 km (road)	7:31:47	Helene Joubert	South Africa	16 September 1995		Winschoten, Netherlands		
100 m hurdles	12.12 (+0.9 m/s)	Tobi Amusan	Nigeria	24 July 2022	World Championships	Eugene, United States		
200 m hurdles (straight)	26.16 (+0.3 m/s)	Zeney van der Walt	South Africa	16 June 2019	Adidas Boost Boston Games	Boston, United States		
300 m hurdles	38.6 h	Mame Tacko Diouf	Senegal	21 February 1999		Dakar, Senegal		
400 m hurdles	52.90	Nezha Bidouane	Morocco	25 August 1999	World Championships	Seville, Spain		
2000 m steeplechase	5:47.42	Beatrice Chepkoech	Kenya	10 September 2023	Hanžeković Memorial	Zagreb, Croatia		
3000 m steeplechase	8:44.32	Beatrice Chepkoech	Kenya	20 July 2018	Herculis	Fontvieille, Monaco		
High jump	2.06 m	Hestrie Cloete	South Africa	31 August 2003	World Championships	Paris Saint-Denis, France		
Pole vault	4.50 m	Ansume de Beer	South Africa	30 June 2026	Fribourg International Meeting	Fribourg, Switzerland		
Long jump	7.17 m (+1.1 m/s)	Ese Brume	Nigeria	29 May 2021	Chula Vista Field Festival	Chula Vista, United States		
Triple jump	15.39 m (+0.5 m/s)	Françoise Mbango Etone	Cameroon	17 August 2008	Olympic Games	Beijing, China		
Shot put	18.43 m (Note: outdoor best; indoor mark ratified as absolute record)	Vivian Chukwuemeka	Nigeria	19 April 2003	Mt. SAC Relays	Walnut, United States		
Shot put	18.86 m X	Vivian Chukwuemeka	Nigeria	1 July 2012	African Championships	Porto-Novo, Benin		
Discus throw	64.96 m	Chioma Onyekwere	Nigeria	14 April 2023	Oklahoma Throws Series Meet 2	Ramona, United States		
Hammer throw	75.49 m	Annette Echikunwoke	Nigeria	22 May 2021	USATF Throws Festival	Tucson, United States		
Javelin throw	69.35 m	Sunette Viljoen	South Africa	9 June 2012	Adidas Grand Prix	New York City, United States		
Weight throw	4.22 m	Birtukan Bouele	Ethiopia	18 July 2020	International Lucerne Masters Throws Pentathlon	Lucerne, Switzerland		
Heptathlon	6423 pts	Margaret Simpson	Ghana	28–29 May 2005	Hypo-Meeting	Götzis, Austria		
Heptathlon	100m H (wind) / High jump / Shot put / 200m (wind) / Long jump (wind) / Javelin / 800m; 13.41 (−0.8 m/s) / 1.85 m / 13.01 m / 24.55 (+1.0 m/s) / 6.32 m (+0.7 m/s) / 52.71 m / 2:21.71							
Decathlon	7014 pts h	Margaret Simpson	Ghana	18–19 April 2007		Réduit, Mauritius		
Decathlon	100m (wind) / Long jump (wind) / Shot put / High jump / 400m / 100m H (wind) / Discus / Pole vault / Javelin / 1500m; 12.3h (NWI) / 5.73 m (NWI) / 12.42 m / 1.72 m / 1:02.2h / 14.0h (NWI) / 32.17 m / 2.50 m / 47.67 m / 5:41.7h							
3000 m walk (track)	23:23.43	Birtukan Bouele	Ethiopia	7 June 2019	Soirée Inter régionale de demi-fond	Belfort, France		
5000 m walk (track)	20:50.03	Chahinez Nasri	Tunisia	23 March 2021		Radès, Tunisia		
5 km walk (road)	22:20	Nicolene Cronje	South Africa	5 March 2004	ABSA Series	Durban, South Africa		
10,000 m walk (track)	43:50.86	Emily Wamusyi Ngii	Kenya	6 August 2022	Commonwealth Games	Birmingham, United Kingdom		
10 km walk (road)	45:05.4	Susan Vermeulen	South Africa	17 April 1999		Bloemfontein, South Africa		
10 km walk (road)	45:02	Chahinez Nasri	Tunisia	28 May 2016	XXX Gran Premio Cantones	A Coruña, Spain		
15 km walk (road)	1:10:31+	Anél Oosthuizen	South Africa	9 April 2016	Poděbrady Walking Race	Poděbrady, Czech Republic		
20,000 m walk (track)	1:36:18.3	Nicolene Cronje	South Africa	17 March 2004		Durban, South Africa		
20 km walk (road)	1:30:40 A	Grace Wanjiru Njue	Kenya	6 June 2018	Kenya Defence Forces Championships	Nairobi, Kenya		
20 km walk (road)	1:28:15 A (Note: Short course)	Grace Wanjiru Njue	Kenya	15 July 2011	Kenyan Championships	Nairobi, Kenya		
35 km walk (road)	3:42:04 (Note: by official result source; 3:40:04 by CAA source, a typo)	Esther Steenkamp	South Africa	15 January 2022 (Note: by official result source; 15 January 2021 by CAA source, a typo)	ASA 35 km Race Walking Championships & Interprovicial Challenge	Cape Town, South Africa		
50 km walk (road)	4:48:00	Nathalie le Roux	South Africa	5 May 2018	IAAF World Race Walking Team Championships	Taicang, China		
4 × 100 m relay	41.90	Murielle Ahouré-Demps; Marie-Josée Ta Lou; Jessika Gbai; Maboundou Koné	Ivory Coast	25 August 2023	World Championships	Budapest, Hungary		
4 × 200 m relay	1:30.52	Blessing Okagbare; Regina George; Dominique Duncan; Christy Udoh	Nigeria	2 May 2015	IAAF World Relays	Nassau, Bahamas		
Sprint medley relay (1,1,2,4)	1:46.05	Eunice Kadogo (100 m); Fresha Mwangi (100 m); Joan Cherono (200 m); Evengeline Makena (400 m)	Kenya	27 April 2019	Penn Relays	Philadelphia, United States		
4 × 400 m relay	3:21.04	Olabisi Afolabi; Fatima Yusuf; Charity Opara; Falilat Ogunkoya	Nigeria	3 August 1996	Olympic Games	Atlanta, United States		
4 × 800 m relay	8:04.28	Agatha Jeruto Kimaswai; Sylvia Chematui Chesebe; Janeth Jepkosgei; Eunice Jepkoech Sum	Kenya	25 May 2014	IAAF World Relays	Nassau, Bahamas		
Distance medley relay	10:43.35	Selah Jepleting Busienei (1200 m); Joy Nakhumicha Sakari (400 m); Sylivia Chematui Chesebe (800 m); Virginia Nyambura Nganga (1600 m)	Kenya	2 May 2015	IAAF World Relays	Nassau, Bahamas		
4 × 1500 m relay	16:33.58	Mercy Cherono; Faith Kipyegon; Irene Jelagat; Hellen Obiri	Kenya	24 May 2014	2014 IAAF World Relays	Nassau, Bahamas		
Ekiden relay	2:13:35	Philes Ongori; Evelyne Kemunto Kimwei; Catherine Ndereba; Jane Wanjiku Gakunyi; Lucy Wangui Kabuu; Sally Chepyego Kaptich	Kenya	23 November 2006	Chiba Ekiden	Chiba, Japan		

=== Mixed ===
Event	Record	Athlete	Nationality	Date	Meet	Place	Ref.
4 × 400 m relay	3:11.16	Gardeo Isaacs; Miranda Coetzee; Leendert Koekemoer; Zenéy van der Walt	South Africa	13 September 2025	World Championships	Tokyo, Japan	

== Indoor ==
=== Men ===
Event	Record	Athlete	Nationality	Date	Meet	Place	Ref.
50 m	5.61+	Deji Aliu	Nigeria	21 February 1999	Meeting Pas de Calais	Liévin, France	
55 m	6.02 A	Leonard Myles-Mills	Ghana	22 February 1997		Colorado Springs, United States	
60 m	6.45 A	Leonard Myles-Mills	Ghana	20 February 1999		Colorado Springs, United States	
60 m	6.45	Kayinsola Ajayi	Nigeria	26 February 2026	SEC Championships	College Station, United Station	
60 m	6.45	Kayinsola Ajayi	Nigeria	14 March 2026	NCAA Division I Championships	Fayetteville, United States	
100 m	10.05	Frankie Fredericks	Namibia	12 February 1996		Tampere, Finland	
200 m	19.92	Frank Fredericks	Namibia	18 February 1996	Meeting Pas de Calais	Liévin, France	
300 m	32.36	Frankie Fredericks	Namibia	28 February 2003		Karlsruhe, Germany	
400 m	44.57	Samuel Ogazi	Nigeria	14 March 2026	NCAA Division I Championships	Fayetteville, United States	
500 m	1:00.71	Onkabetse Nkobolo	Botswana	17 February 2016	Globen Galan	Stockholm, Sweden	
600 y	1:06.93	Moitalel Naadokila	Kenya	15 February 2020		Lubbock, United States	
600 m	1:14.79 A	Michael Saruni	Kenya	19 January 2018	Dr. Martin Luther King Collegiate Invitational	Albuquerque, United States	
800 m	1:43.98	Michael Saruni	Kenya	9 February 2019	Millrose Games	New York City, United States	
1000 m	2:14.20	Ayanleh Souleiman	Djibouti	17 February 2016	Globen Galan	Stockholm, Sweden	
1500 m	3:31.04	Samuel Tefera	Ethiopia	16 February 2019	Birmingham Indoor Grand Prix	Birmingham, United Kingdom	
Mile	3:47.01	Yomif Kejelcha	Ethiopia	3 March 2019	Bruce Lehane Invitational	Boston, United States	
2000 m	4:49.99	Kenenisa Bekele	Ethiopia	17 February 2007	Aviva Indoor Grand Prix	Birmingham, United Kingdom	
3000 m	7:23.81	Lamecha Girma	Ethiopia	15 February 2023	Meeting Hauts-de-France Pas-de-Calais	Liévin, France	
Two miles	8:04.35	Kenenisa Bekele	Ethiopia	16 February 2008	Aviva Indoor Grand Prix	Birmingham, United Kingdom	
5000 m	12:49.60	Kenenisa Bekele	Ethiopia	20 February 2004	Aviva Indoor Grand Prix	Birmingham, United Kingdom	
10,000 m	27:50.29	Mark Bett	Kenya	10 February 2002	Indoor Flanders Meeting	Ghent, Belgium	
50 m hurdles	6.48+	Shaun Bownes	South Africa	25 February 2001	Meeting Pas de Calais	Liévin, France	
55 m hurdles	7.13	Lehann Fourie	South Africa	11 February 2012	Millrose Games	New York City, United States	
60 m hurdles	7.52	Shaun Bownes	South Africa	23 February 2001	Indoor Flanders Meeting	Ghent, Belgium	
60 m hurdles	7.50	Franco Le Roux	South Africa	21 March 2026	World Championships	Toruń, Poland	
300 m hurdles	34.92 OT	Llewellyn Herbert	South Africa	9 February 1999	Pirkkahall	Tampere, Finland	
400 m hurdles	50.94	Mamadou Hasse	Senegal	12 February 2013	International Meeting Val-de-Reuil	Val-de-Reuil, France	
400 m hurdles	49.90 OT	Llewellyn Herbert	South Africa	9 February 2005	Botnia Games	Korsholm, Finland	
2000 m steeplechase	5:13.77 WB	Paul Kipsiele Koech	Kenya	13 February 2011	Indoor Flanders Meeting	Ghent, Belgium	
High jump	2.32 m	Anthony Idiata	Nigeria	15 February 2000		Patras, Greece	
Pole vault	5.90 m	Okkert Brits	South Africa	16 February 1997	Meeting Pas de Calais	Liévin, France	
Pole vault	5.90 m	Okkert Brits	South Africa	1 June 1997		Toronto, Canada	
Long jump	8.44 m	Luvo Manyonga	South Africa	2 March 2018	World Championships	Birmingham, United Kingdom	
Triple jump	18.07 m	Hugues Fabrice Zango	Burkina Faso	16 January 2021		Aubière, France	
Shot put	21.47 m	Janus Robberts	South Africa	1 December 2001		Norman, United States	
Weight throw	24.39 m	Chukwuebuka Enekwechi	Nigeria	13 February 2015	Fred Wilt Invitational	West Lafayette, United States	
Discus throw	63.37 m	Yasser Fathy	Egypt	27 March 2010	Wexiö Indoor Throwing Competition	Växjö, Sweden	
Heptathlon	5911 pts	Larbi Bourrada	Algeria	27–28 February 2010	Championnats de France Elite	Paris, France	
Heptathlon	60m / Long jump / Shot put / High jump / 60m H / Pole vault / 1000m; 6.89 / 7.34 m / 14.00 m / 1.92 m / 8.05 / 4.60 m / 2:39.86						
5000 m walk	19:39.92	Hédi Teraoui	Tunisia	18 February 2018	French Championships	Liévin, France	
4 × 400 m relay	3:07.95	Tobi Ogunmola; Noah Akwu; Salihu Isah; Cristian Morton	Nigeria	8 March 2014	World Championships	Sopot, Poland	
4 × 400 m relay	3:06.96	Wiseman Mukhobe; Zablon Ekwam; Kelvin Tauta; Boniface Mweresa	Kenya	3 March 2024	World Championships	Glasgow, United Kingdom	
4 × 400 m relay	3:06.71	Wiseman Mukhobe; Zablon Ekwam; Kelvin Tauta; Boniface Mweresa	Kenya	3 March 2024	World Championships	Glasgow, United Kingdom	

=== Women ===
Event	Record	Athlete	Nationality	Date	Meet	Place	Ref.
50 m	6.04+	Chioma Ajunwa	Nigeria	22 February 1998	Meeting Pas de Calais	Liévin, France	
55 m	6.58	Beatrice Utondu-Okoye	Nigeria	11 February 1990		Monroe, United States	
60 m	6.97	Murielle Ahouré	Ivory Coast	2 March 2018	World Championships	Birmingham, United Kingdom	
200 m	22.11 A	Favour Ofili	Nigeria	10 March 2023	NCAA Division I Championships	Albuquerque, United States	
300 m	35.99	Favour Ofili	Nigeria	4 February 2024	New Balance Indoor Grand Prix	Boston, United States	
400 m	50.73	Charity Opara	Nigeria	1 February 1998	Sparkassen Cup	Stuttgart, Germany	
400 m	50.28	Ella Onojuvwevwo	Nigeria	13 March 2026	NCAA Division I Championships	Fayetteville, United States	
500 m	1:11.48	Akua Obeng-Akrofi	Ghana	2 February 2018	Metropolitan Indoor Championships	New York City, United States	
600 m	1:24.19	Sanu Jallow-Lockhart	Gambia	16 January 2026	Arkansas Invitational	Fayetteville, United States	
800 m	1:57.06	Maria Mutola	Mozambique	21 February 1999	Meeting Pas de Calais	Liévin, France	
800 m	1:56.36 (Note: Disallowed for running inside curb.)	Maria Mutola	Mozambique	22 February 1998	Meeting Pas de Calais	Liévin, France	
1000 m	2:30.94	Maria Mutola	Mozambique	25 February 1999	GE Galan	Stockholm, Sweden	
1500 m	3:53.09	Gudaf Tsegay	Ethiopia	9 February 2021	Meeting Hauts-de-France Pas-de-Calais	Liévin, France	
Mile	4:13.31	Genzebe Dibaba	Ethiopia	17 February 2016	Globen Galan	Stockholm, Sweden	
2000 m	5:23.75	Genzebe Dibaba	Ethiopia	7 February 2017	Míting Internacional de Catalunya	Sabadell, Spain	
3000 m	8:16.60	Genzebe Dibaba	Ethiopia	6 February 2014	XL Galan	Stockholm, Sweden	
Two miles	9:00.48	Genzebe Dibaba	Ethiopia	15 February 2014	Aviva Indoor Grand Prix	Birmingham, United Kingdom	
5000 m	14:18.86	Genzebe Dibaba	Ethiopia	19 February 2015	XL Galan	Stockholm, Sweden	
50 m hurdles	6.76+	Glory Alozie	Nigeria	25 February 2001	Meeting Pas de Calais	Liévin, France	
55 m hurdles	7.60	Ime Akpan	Nigeria	13 March 1992	NCAA Division I Women's Championships	Indianapolis, United States	
60 m hurdles	7.82	Glory Alozie	Nigeria	16 February 1999		Madrid, Spain	
60 m hurdles	7.77	Tobi Amusan	Nigeria	27 January 2024	Astana Indoor Meeting	Astana, Kazakhstan	
60 m hurdles	7.75	Tobi Amusan	Nigeria	4 February 2024	New Balance Indoor Grand Prix	Boston, United States	
400 m hurdles	58.66	Haissat Lambarki	Morocco	29 January 2012		Bordeaux, France	
High jump	1.97 m	Hestrie Cloete	South Africa	18 February 2001	Aviva Indoor Grand Prix	Birmingham, United Kingdom	
Pole vault	4.41 m	Elmarie Gerryts	South Africa	20 February 2000	Aviva Indoor Grand Prix	Birmingham, United Kingdom	
Long jump	6.97 m	Chioma Ajunwa	Nigeria	5 February 1997		Erfurt, Germany	
Triple jump	14.90 m	Yamilé Aldama	Sudan	6 March 2004	World Championships	Budapest, Hungary	
Shot put	18.50 m	Jessica Oji	Nigeria	1 March 2026	Ivy League Championships	New York City, United States	
Weight throw	25.32 m	Oyesade Olatoye	Nigeria	10 February 2023	Music City Challenge	Nashville, United States	
Pentathlon	4558 pts	Eunice Barber	Sierra Leone	7 March 1997		Paris, France	
Pentathlon	60m H / High jump / Shot put / Long jump / 800m; 8.39 / 1.80 m / 13.05 m / 6.35 m / 2:18.17						
3000 m walk	14:13.46	Tahani Ghazal	Tunisia	3 February 2018		Lyon, France	
4 × 400 m relay	3:29.67 (Note: by official result source; 3:22.67 by CAA source, prabably a mistake)	Omolara Omotosho; Patience Okon George; Bukola Abogunloko; Folashade Abugan	Nigeria	8 March 2014	World Championships	Sopot, Poland	
