= 2005 in the sport of athletics =

2005 in athletics
- Major world events: 2005 World Championships
- IAAF Athletes of the Year: Kenenisa Bekele; Yelena Isinbayeva

This page shows the main events during the 2005 year in the sport of athletics throughout the world.

== Major events ==
=== World ===
- World Championships
- World Athletics Final
- World Cross Country Championships
- World Half Marathon Championships
- World Youth Championships
- World Student Games
- Golden League

=== Regional ===
- African Junior Championships
- Bolivarian Games
- Central American and Caribbean Championships
- South American Championships
- Jeux de la Francophonie
- European Indoor Championships
- European U23 Championships
- European Junior Championships
- European Cup
- European Cross Country Championships
- European Mountain Running Championships
- European Race Walking Cup
- Balkan Games
- Mediterranean Games
- Asian Championships
- Asian Indoor Games
- Central Asian Games
- East Asian Games
- Islamic Solidarity Games
- Southeast Asian Games
- West Asian Games

=== National ===
- 2005 Chinese National Games

== World records ==
=== Men ===
Event	Athlete	Nation	Performance	Meeting	Place	Date
100 metres	Asafa Powell	Jamaica	9.77		Athens, Greece	14 June
10,000 metres	Kenenisa Bekele	Ethiopia	26:17.53		Brussels, Belgium	26 August
20 km (road)	Samuel Kamau Wanjiru	Kenya	59:16+		Rotterdam, Netherlands	11 September
30 km (road)	Takayuki Matsumiya	Japan	1:28:00		Kumamoto, Japan	27 February
Road relay	Josephat Ndambiri; Martin Mathathi; Daniel Muchunu Mwangi; Mekubo Mogusu; Onesmus Nyerre; John Kariuki	Kenya	1:57:06		Chiba, Japan	23 November

=== Women ===
Event	Athlete	Nation	Performance	Meeting	Place	Date
25 km (road)	Mizuki Noguchi	Japan	1:22:13+		Berlin, Germany	25 September
30 km (road)	Mizuki Noguchi	Japan	1:38:49+		Berlin, Germany	25 September
Marathon (women only)	Paula Radcliffe	United Kingdom	2:17:42		London, United Kingdom	17 April
Pole vault	Yelena Isinbaeva	Russia	4.93 m		Lausanne, Switzerland	5 July
Pole vault	Yelena Isinbaeva	Russia	4.95 m		Madrid, Spain	16 July
Pole vault	Yelena Isinbaeva	Russia	4.96 m		London, United Kingdom	22 July
Pole vault	Yelena Isinbaeva	Russia	5.00 m		London, United Kingdom	22 July
Pole vault	Yelena Isinbaeva	Russia	5.01 m		Helsinki, Finland	12 August
Hammer throw	Tatyana Lysenko	Russia	77.06 m		Moscow, Russia	15 July
Javelin Throw (new)	Osleidys Menéndez	Cuba	71.70 m		Helsinki, Finland	14 August
Decathlon	Austra Skujytė	Lithuania	8358 pts		(United States) Columbia, Missouri, USA	14-15 April

== Awards ==
=== Men ===
2005 Award	Winner
IAAF World Athlete of the Year	Kenenisa Bekele (ETH)
Track & Field Athlete of the Year	Kenenisa Bekele (ETH)
European Athlete of the Year Award	Virgilijus Alekna (LTU)
Best Male Track Athlete ESPY Award	Not Awarded

=== Women ===
2005 Award	Winner
IAAF World Athlete of the Year	Yelena Isinbayeva (RUS)
Track & Field Athlete of the Year	Yelena Isinbayeva (RUS)
European Athlete of the Year Award	Yelena Isinbayeva (RUS)
Best Female Track Athlete ESPY Award	Not Awarded

== Season's best performances ==
=== Men ===
==== 400 m hurdles ====
RANK	2005 WORLD BEST PERFORMERS	TIME
1.	Kerron Clement (USA)	47.24
2.	Bershawn Jackson (USA)	47.30
3.	James Carter (USA)	47.43
4.	Bennie Brazell (USA)	47.67
5.	Bayano Kamani (PAN)	47.84

==== 3000 m steeplechase ====
RANK	2005 WORLD BEST PERFORMERS	TIME
1.	Saif Saeed Shaheen (QAT)	7:55.51
2.	Paul Kipsiele Koech (KEN)	7:56.37
3.	Brimin Kipruto (KEN)	8:04.22
4.	Brahim Boulami (MAR)	8:04.92
5.	Simon Vroemen (NED)	8:04.95

==== Pole vault ====
RANK	2005 WORLD BEST PERFORMERS	HEIGHT
1.	Paul Burgess (AUS)	6.00 m
2.	Brad Walker (USA)	5.96 m
3.	Tim Lobinger (GER)	5.93 m
4.	Toby Stevenson (USA)	5.90 m
5.	Steven Hooker (AUS)	5.87 m

=== Women ===
==== 100 metres ====
RANK	2005 WORLD BEST PERFORMERS	TIME
1.	Chandra Sturrup (BAH)	10.84
2.	Veronica Campbell (JAM)	10.85
3.	Lauryn Williams (USA)	10.88
4.	Christine Arron (FRA)	10.93
5.	Sherone Simpson (JAM)	10.97

==== 200 metres ====
RANK	2005 WORLD BEST PERFORMERS	TIME
1.	Allyson Felix (USA)	22.13
2.	Rachelle Smith (USA)	22.22
3.	Lauryn Williams (USA)	22.27
4.	Christine Arron (FRA)	22.31
5.	LaTasha Colander (USA)	22.34

==== 400 metres ====
RANK	2005 WORLD BEST PERFORMERS	TIME
1.	Sanya Richards (USA)	48.92
2.	Tonique Williams-Darling (BAH)	49.30
3.	Svetlana Pospelova (RUS)	49.80
4.	Ana Guevara (MEX)	49.81
5.	DeeDee Trotter (USA)	49.88

==== 800 metres ====
RANK	2005 WORLD BEST PERFORMERS	TIME
1.	Tatyana Andrianova (RUS)	1:56.07
2.	Svetlana Cherkasova (RUS)	1:56.93
3.	Larisa Chzhao (RUS)	1:57.33
4.	Svetlana Klyuka (RUS)	1:57.35
5.	Olga Kotlyarova (RUS)	1:57.55

==== 1500 metres ====
RANK	2005 WORLD BEST PERFORMERS	TIME
1.	Maryam Yusuf Jamal (BHR)	3:56.79
2.	Natalya Yevkodimova (RUS)	3:57.73
3.	Yuliya Fomenko (RUS)	3:58.68
4.	Tatyana Tomashova (RUS)	3:59.05
5.	Olga Yegorova (RUS)	3:59.47

==== 3000 metres ====
RANK	2005 WORLD BEST PERFORMERS	TIME
1.	Maryam Yusuf Jamal (BHR)	8:28.87
2.	Edith Masai (KEN)	8:31.27
3.	Isabella Ochichi (KEN)	8:31.42
4.	Berhane Adere (ETH)	8:31.89
5.	Meseret Defar (ETH)	8:33.57

==== 5000 metres ====
RANK	2005 WORLD BEST PERFORMERS	TIME
1.	Meseret Defar (ETH)	14:28.98
2.	Berhane Adere (ETH)	14:31.09
3.	Tirunesh Dibaba (ETH)	14:32.42
4.	Edith Masai (KEN)	14:37.20
5.	Ejegayehu Dibaba (ETH)	14:37.34

==== 10,000 metres ====
RANK	2005 WORLD BEST PERFORMERS	TIME
1.	Tirunesh Dibaba (ETH)	30:15.67
2.	Ejegayehu Dibaba (ETH)	30:18.39
3.	Werknesh Kidane (ETH)	30:19.39
4.	Berhane Adere (ETH)	30:25.41
5.	Xing Huina (CHN)	30:27.18

==== Half marathon ====
RANK	2005 WORLD BEST PERFORMERS	TIME
1.	Derartu Tulu (ETH)	1:07:33

==== 100 m hurdles ====
RANK	2005 WORLD BEST PERFORMERS	TIME
1.	Michelle Perry (USA)	12.43
2.	Joanna Hayes (USA)	12.47
3.	Brigitte Foster-Hylton (JAM)	12.55
4.	Anjanette Kirkland (USA)	12.57
4.	Delloreen Ennis-London (JAM)	12.57

==== 400 m hurdles ====
RANK	2005 WORLD BEST PERFORMERS	TIME
1.	Yuliya Pechonkina (RUS)	52.90
2.	Lashinda Demus (USA)	53.27
3.	Sandra Glover (USA)	53.32
4.	Jana Rawlinson (AUS)	53.44
5.	Anna Jesień (POL)	53.96

==== 3000 m steeplechase ====
RANK	2005 WORLD BEST PERFORMERS	TIME
1.	Dorcus Inzikuru (UGA)	9:15.04
2.	Yekaterina Volkova (RUS)	9:20.49
3.	Wioletta Janowska (POL)	9:25.09
4.	Jeruto Kiptum (KEN)	9:26.95
5.	Mardrea Hyman (JAM)	9:27.21

==== High jump ====
RANK	2005 WORLD BEST PERFORMERS	HEIGHT
1.	Kajsa Bergqvist (SWE)	2.03 m
2.	Yelena Slesarenko (RUS)	2.00 m
2.	Chaunte Howard (USA)	2.00 m
4.	Anna Chicherova (RUS)	1.99 m
5.	Tatyana Kivimyagi (RUS)	1.98 m
5.	Venelina Veneva (BUL)	1.98 m

==== Pole vault ====
RANK	2005 WORLD BEST PERFORMERS	HEIGHT
1.	Yelena Isinbayeva (RUS)	5.01 m
2.	Anna Rogowska (POL)	4.83 m
3.	Monika Pyrek (POL)	4.70 m
4.	Tracy O'Hara (USA)	4.60 m
4.	Vanessa Boslak (FRA)	4.60 m
4.	Mary Vincent (USA)	4.60 m
4.	Stacy Dragila (USA)	4.60 m

==== Heptathlon ====
RANK	2005 WORLD BEST PERFORMERS	POINTS
1.	Eunice Barber (FRA)	6889
2.	Carolina Klüft (SWE)	6887
3.	Kelly Sotherton (GBR)	6547
4.	Hyleas Fountain (USA)	6502
5.	Margaret Simpson (GHA)	6423

== Marathon ==
=== Men's competition ===
==== Best Year Performances ====
RANK	ATHLETE	TIME	EVENT
1.	Haile Gebrselassie (ETH)	2:06:19	Amsterdam Marathon
2.	Felix Limo (KEN)	2:07:02	Chicago Marathon
3.	Benjamin Maiyo (KEN)	2:07:09	Chicago Marathon
4.	Daniel Njenga (KEN)	2:07:14	Chicago Marathon
5.	Martin Lel (KEN)	2:07:26	London Marathon
6.	Evans Rutto (KEN)	2:07:28	Chicago Marathon
7.	Julio Rey (ESP)	2:07:38	Hamburg Marathon
8.	Toshinari Takaoka (JPN)	2:07:41	Tokyo Marathon
—	Philip Manyim (KEN)	2:07:41	Berlin Marathon
10.	Patrick Ivuti (KEN)	2:07:46	Chicago Marathon

=== Women's competition ===
==== Best Year Performances ====
RANK	ATHLETE	TIME	EVENT
1.	Paula Radcliffe (GBR)	2:17:42	London Marathon
2.	Mizuki Noguchi (JPN)	2:19:12	Berlin Marathon
3.	Paula Radcliffe (GBR)	2:20:57	Helsinki Marathon
4.	Sun Yingjie (CHN)	2:21:01	Beijing Marathon
5.	Zhou Chunxiu (CHN)	2:21:11	Beijing Marathon
6.	Deena Kastor (USA)	2:21:25	Chicago Marathon
7.	Constantina Tomescu (ROM)	2:21:30	Chicago Marathon
8.	Catherine Ndereba (KEN)	2:22:01	Helsinki Marathon
9.	Constantina Tomescu (ROM)	2:22:50	London Marathon
10.	Jeļena Prokopčuka (LAT)	2:22:56	Osaka International Ladies Marathon

- Saint Silvester Marathon

== Deaths ==
- May 27 — Piotr Gładki (33), Polish long-distance runner (b. 1972)
