= Yuichiro Ueno =

Japanese long-distance runner

Yuichiro Ueno (上野 裕一郎, Ueno Yuichirō; born 29 July 1985 in Saku, Nagano) is a Japanese professional long-distance runner who specializes in the 1500 and 5000 metres events.

Ueno began his international career at the IAAF World Cross Country Championships, where he ran in the junior race in 2004, then in the senior short race for the two years following that. He represented Japan in the International Chiba Ekiden in 2007, starting off the race with the second fastest leg, behind Moses Ndiema Masai. Japan won the competition.

Ueno won in the 1500 m and 5000 m at the 2009 Japan Championships in Athletics, beating his teammate Kensuke Takezawa in the latter race. He finished 16th in his heat in the 5000 m at the 2009 World Championships in Athletics, and won bronze medals in the 1500 m and 5000 m at the East Asian Games later that year.

Ueno competed for Nagano in the 2011 Inter-Prefectural Men's Ekiden and ran in the final 13 km leg, improving the prefecture to second place in the final rankings behind Tochigi. Later that year he ran the opening leg of the International Chiba Ekiden and the Japanese team finished as runner-up behind Kenya.

He is managed by Toshihiko Seko of S&B Foods.

== Personal bests ==
- 1500 metres - 3:40.83 min (2010)
- 3000 metres - 7:57.70 min (2006)
- 5000 metres - 13:21.49 min (2007)
- 10,000 metres - 28:27.39 min (2003)

== See also ==
- List of 5000 metres national champions (men)
