= Kagawa Marugame Half Marathon =

Annual road competition in Marugame, Japan

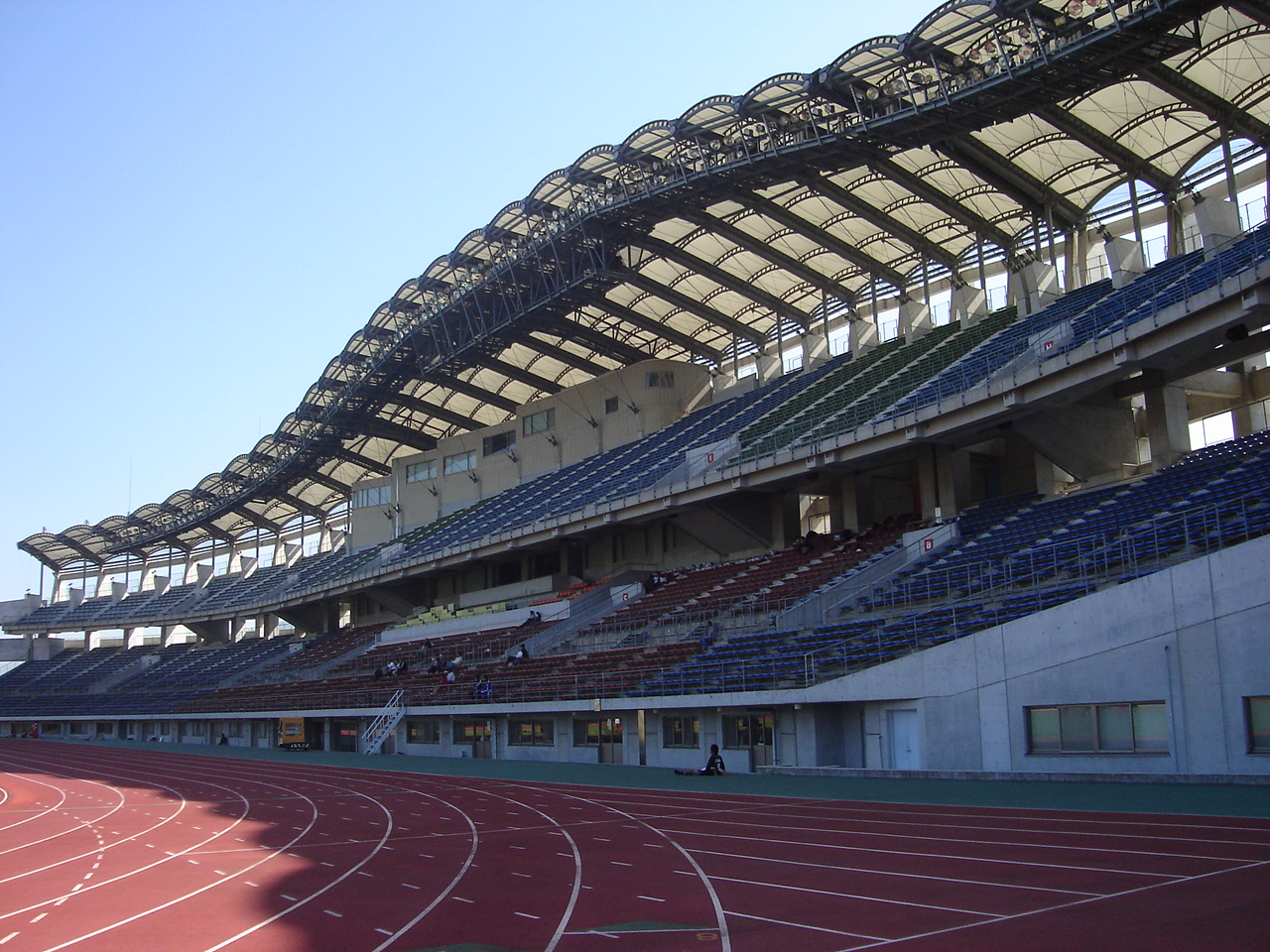
- Marugame Stadium is the start and finishing point of the race
- Date: Early February
- Location: Marugame, Japan
- Event type: Road
- Distance: Half marathon
- Primary sponsor: Suzuki
- Established: 1947
- Course records: Men: 59:16 (2025) (Kenya) Alexander Mutiso; Women: 1:06:05 (2025) (Kenya) Dolphine Omare
- Website: Kagawa Marugame Half Marathon
- Participants: 943 (2020)

The Kagawa Marugame Half Marathon (香川丸亀ハーフマラソン, Kagawa Marugame Hāfu Marason) is an annual road running competition which takes place in early February in Marugame, Japan. It currently holds IAAF Silver Label Road Race status and the professional races attract over 1000 entries each year, and hosted by the Sankei Shimbun, Sankei Sports, Okayama Broadcasting, BS Fuji.

The race in Marugame was first held in 1947 as a full-length marathon, known as the Kagawa Marathon. A companion 20 km race began in 1949 in addition to the scheduled marathon. The course lengths were gradually reduced over time: the main race lasted as a full marathon until 1961 when a 35 km race was held and the shorter race became a 10 km competition. The main race was again shortened in 1971, being reduced to a 20 km race. The competitions were known as the Kagawa Road Races until 1997, when the main race was slightly extended to the half marathon distance and the competition received its current moniker.

Competitors in the professional races are largely Japanese athletes, supplemented by African athletes based in the country. In addition, a small number of foreign athletes are invited to compete each year. The level of competition is strong: Kenyan runner Mekubo Mogusu recorded a sub-60 minute time in 2007 for the men's course record (59:48), while the women's course record of 1:07:26, set by Kayoko Fukushi in 2006, is the Asian record for the half marathon. The course is AIMS-certified making performances at the course eligible for national and world records.

The course of the half marathon is largely linear, beginning at the Marugame Stadium and heading eastwards before abruptly looping back to follow the same path back towards the finish point within the stadium.

== Past winners ==
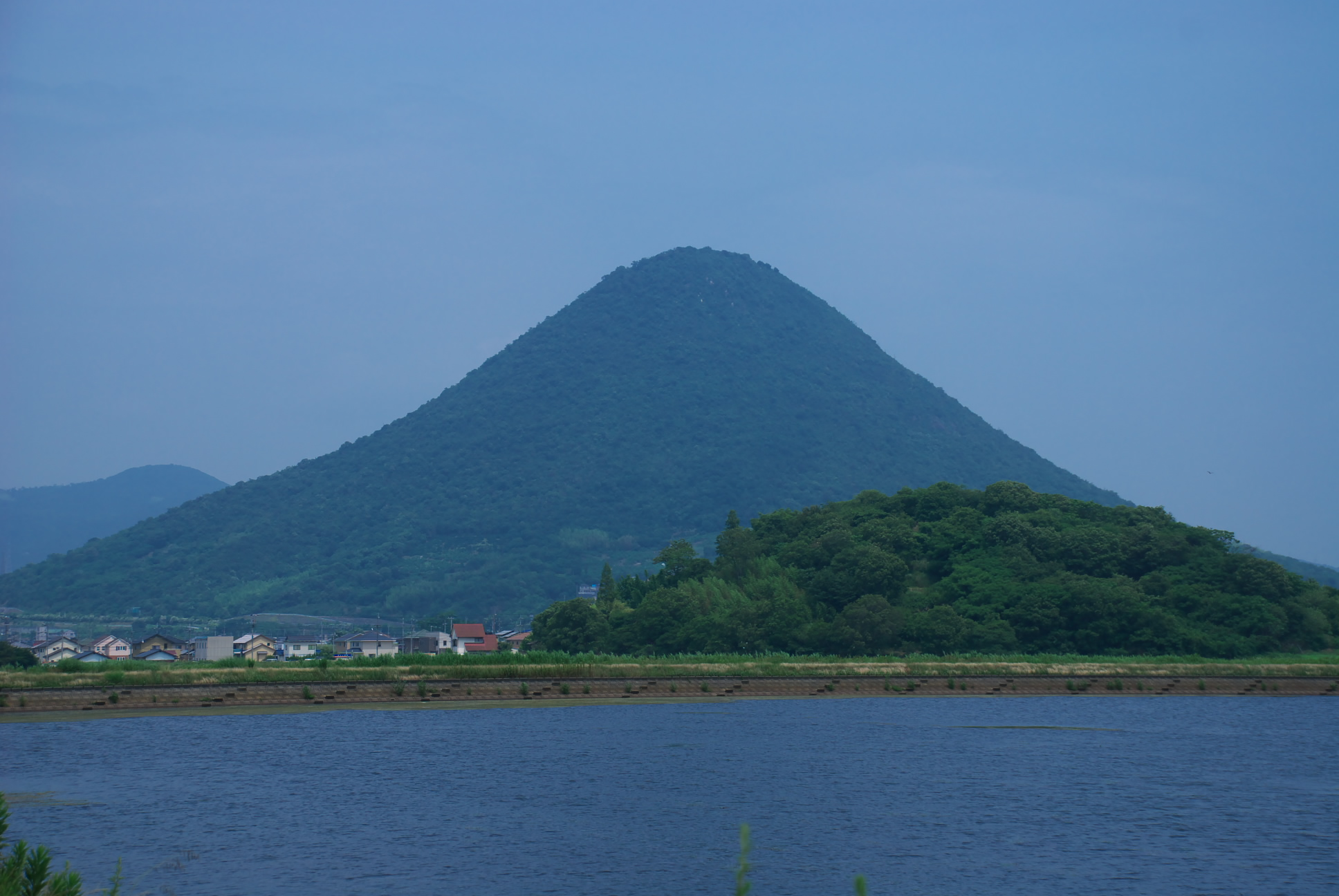
One of the many mountains that overlook the city of Marugame

=== Early distances ===
Key: Marathon 35 km 20 km

Edition	Year	Men's winner	Time (h:m:s)
1st	1947	Toshio Fuke (JPN)	2:47:30
2nd	1948	Toshio Fuke (JPN)	2:39:54
3rd	1949	Giichi Noda (JPN)	2:40:08
4th	1950	Toshio Fuke (JPN)	2:39:21
5th	1951	Toshio Fuke (JPN)	2:39:41
6th	1952	Giichi Noda (JPN)	2:37:27
7th	1953	Fumio Kuramoto (JPN)	2:49:16
8th	1954	Giichi Noda (JPN)	2:35:08
—	1955	Not held	—
9th	1956	Matsuichi Murakami (JPN)	2:54:56
10th	1957	Hideaki Nagai (JPN)	3:15:20
11th	1958	Muneyuki Maekawa (JPN)	3:00:54
12th	1959	Takayoshi Yokoi (JPN)	2:44:02
13th	1960	Takayoshi Yokoi (JPN)	2:45:43
14th	1961	Yukio Kimura (JPN)	2:12:18
15th	1962	Kazuo Tanisawa (JPN)	2:09:13
16th	1963	Yukio Kimura (JPN)	2:09:53
17th	1964	Ryuji Kobayashi (JPN)	2:03:43
18th	1965	Sumio Kohama (JPN)	2:01:47
19th	1966	Tsutomu Tsunei (JPN)	2:02:02
20th	1967	Kazuo Tanisawa (JPN)	2:01:57
—	1968	Not held	—
21st	1969	Iwao Hamamoto (JPN)	1:55:15
22nd	1970	Iwao Hamamoto (JPN)	1:56:55
23rd	1971	Noboru Miyatake (JPN)	1:05:59
24th	1972	Yoshimitsu Nakamura (JPN)	1:07:06
25th	1973	Masatomo Seki (JPN)	1:08:50
26th	1974	Hiroshi Yamaguchi (JPN)	1:08:03
27th	1975	Masatomo Seki (JPN)	1:08:44
28th	1976	Masakazu Ichimura (JPN)	1:07:42
29th	1977	Masahiro Takebayashi (JPN)	1:06:23
30th	1978	Masahiro Takebayashi (JPN)	1:04:26
31st	1979	Masahiro Takebayashi (JPN)	1:04:43
32nd	1980	Masahiro Takebayashi (JPN)	1:03:53
33rd	1981	Masahiro Takebayashi (JPN)	1:03:45
34th	1982	Sachi Utsunomiya (JPN)	1:04:09
35th	1983	Toshihiko Sasaki (JPN)	1:08:33
36th	1984	Yasumasa Takagi (JPN)	1:04:57
37th	1985	Shoji Nakanishi (JPN)	1:05:33
38th	1986	Masahiro Takebayashi (JPN)	1:05:11
39th	1987	Masahiro Takebayashi (JPN)	1:04:45
40th	1988	Shoji Nakanishi (JPN)	1:08:19
41st	1989	Masahiro Takebayashi (JPN)	1:06:34
42nd	1990	Masahiro Takebayashi (JPN)	1:06:16
43rd	1991	Minoru Kishimoto (JPN)	1:02:21
44th	1992	Masahiro Takebayashi (JPN)	1:08:30
45th	1993	Hiroshi Fujisawa (JPN)	1:04:09
46th	1994	Masayuki Arakawa (JPN)	1:08:11
47th	1995	Masayuki Arakawa (JPN)	1:05:36
48th	1996	Yoshihiro Hiramori (JPN)	1:04:20

=== Half marathon ===
Key: Course record

Edition	Year	Men's winner	Time (h:m:s)	Women's winner	Time (h:m:s)
49th	1997	Yoshihiro Hiramori (JPN)	1:09:01	Not held	—
50th	1998	Yoshihiro Hiramori (JPN)	1:09:00	Not held	—
51st	1999	Daisuke Matsubara (JPN)	1:08:02	Not held	—
52nd	2000	Kazuhito Yokota (JPN)	1:02:59	Rie Ueno (JPN)	1:09:57
53rd	2001	Hidemori Noguchi (JPN)	1:02:28	Ikumi Nagayama (JPN)	1:09:28
54th	2002	Laban Kagika (KEN)	1:01:43	Mari Ozaki (JPN)	1:09:33
55th	2003	Zakayo Ngatho (KEN)	1:00:21	Yasuko Hashimoto (JPN)	1:09:32
56th	2004	Pharis Kimani (KEN)	1:01:55	Yasuko Hashimoto (JPN)	1:10:46
57th	2005	Laban Kagika (KEN)	1:01:36	Takako Kotorida (JPN)	1:09:34
58th	2006	Takayuki Matsumiya (JPN)	1:02:13	Kayoko Fukushi (JPN)	1:07:26 AR
59th	2007	Mekubo Mogusu (KEN)	59:48	Kayoko Fukushi (JPN)	1:08:00
60th	2008	Harun Mbugua (KEN)	1:01:35	Philes Ongori (KEN)	1:07:57
61st	2009	Mekubo Mogusu (KEN)	1:00:37	Mara Yamauchi (GBR)	1:08:29
62nd	2010	Daniel Gitau (KEN)	1:01:08	Nikki Chapple (AUS)	1:08:37
63rd	2011	Samuel Ndungu (KEN)	1:00:55	Kayoko Fukushi (JPN)	1:09:00
64th	2012	Mathew Kisorio (KEN)	1:00:02	Tiki Gelana (ETH)	1:08:48
65th	2013	Collis Birmingham (AUS)	1:00:56	Tiki Gelana (ETH)	1:08:53
66th	2014	Martin Mathathi (KEN)	1:00:11	Eri Makikawa (JPN)	1:10:27
67th	2015	Paul Kuira (KEN) Zane Robertson (NZ)	59:47	Eloise Wellings (AUS)	1:10:41
68th	2016	Goitom Kifle (ERI)	1:00:49	Eunice Kirwa (BHR)	1:08:06
69th	2017	Callum Hawkins (GBR)	1:00:00	Eunice Kirwa (BHR)	1:08:07
70th	2018	Edward Waweru (KEN)	1:00:31	Betsy Saina (KEN)	1:09:17
71st	2019	Abdi Nageeye (NED)	1:00:24	Betsy Saina (KEN)	1:07:49
72nd	2020	Brett Robinson (AUS)	59:57	Helalia Johannes (NAM)	1:08:10
Editions 73rd (2021) and 74th (2022) were not held due to COVID-19 pandemic in Japan
75th	2023	Alexander Mutiso (KEN)	59:17	Pauline Kamulu (KEN)	1:07:22
76th	2024	Richard Etir (KEN)	59:32	Dolphine Omare (KEN)	1:06:07
77th	2025	Alexander Mutiso (KEN)	59:16	Dolphine Omare (KEN)	1:06:05

== Statistics ==
- Note: All statistics apply to international half marathon only

=== Winners by country ===
Country	Men's race	Women's race	Total
Kenya	14	3	17
Japan	6	10	16
Australia	2	2	4
Great Britain	1	1	2
Eritrea	1	0	1
Bahrain	0	1	1
Scotland	1	0	1
Namibia	0	1	1
Netherlands	1	0	1

=== Multiple winners ===
Athlete	Country	Wins	Years
Yoshihiro Hiramori	Japan	2	1997, 1998
Laban Kagika	Kenya	2	2002, 2005
Yasuko Hashimoto	Japan	2	2003, 2004
Kayoko Fukushi	Japan	2	2006, 2007, 2011
Mekubo Mogusu	Kenya	2	2007, 2009
Eunice Kirwa	Bahrain	2	2016, 2017
Betsy Saina	Kenya	2	2018, 2019

== See also ==
- Tokyo Marathon
- Osaka International Ladies Marathon (Osaka Women's Marathon)
- Sankei Shimbun - daily newspaper in Japan
- Okayama Broadcasting.
- Fujisankei Communications Group - Sankei Shimbun and Fuji Television, the largest media conglomerate in Japan
