= Samuel Ndungu =

Kenyan long-distance runner (born 1988)

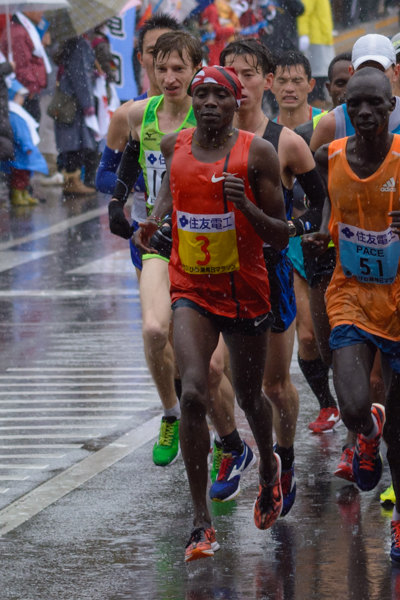
Ndungu running at the 2015 Lake Biwa Marathon

Samuel Ndungu Wanjiku (born 4 April 1988) is a Kenyan long-distance runner who specialises in the 10,000 metres and road running events. He has a half marathon best of 60:55 minutes and a marathon best of 2:07:04 hours. A Japan-based runner, he has won the Lake Biwa Marathon, the Marugame Half Marathon, and was the 2010 Japanese Corporate champion the half marathon.

== Career ==
Ndungu became interested in athletics at a young age and joined a club at age twelve. He attended Kagondo High School, near Nyahururu in Kenya's Rift Valley Province. His first successes in running came through competing in cross country races in his region. Starting from the age of fifteen, he came fifth in the junior race at the Eastern Africa Region Cross Country Championships in 2005, then won the junior competition the following year. In April 2007, the nineteen-year-old Ndungu joined the Japanese corporate running team at Aichi Steel.

After moving to Japan, he began to focus on track running and set bests of 13:30.29 and 27:48.03 minutes for the 5000 metres and 10,000 metres, respectively. He knocked his best down to 13:28.44 in the shorter event in 2008 and also started doing road races for Aichi. He came third at the Kosa 10 Mile Road Race and second at the Nagoya Half Marathon. He continued running half marathons in 2009 and again placed top three in Nagoya and was fourth in Sapporo. The 2010 brought his first major accomplishments. After a strong performance as pacemaker at the Lake Biwa Marathon, he won the title at the All Japan Corporate Team Half Marathon Championships with a personal best of 61:19 minutes. He also reached the top three of the Sapporo Half Marathon that year. He improved further in 2010, helping pace Wilson Kipsang to a course record at the Lake Biwa race and winning the Marugame Half Marathon with a best of 60:55 minutes.

Moving beyond his pacing days, he entered the 2011 Lake Biwa Marathon as a competitive runner. He made the second-fastest ever marathon debut in Japan (after Olympic champion Samuel Wanjiru) with his time of 2:07:04 hours, which was enough to win on his first outing, as he was half a minute ahead of Henryk Szost, who ran a Polish record. Turning back to the shorter distance, he came runner-up to Martin Mathathi at the Gifu Seiryu Half Marathon in May. Building on his debut success, he was invited to the 2012 Chicago Marathon and he came close to his best with a run of 2:07:26 hours for seventh place at the World Marathon Major race.

== Personal bests ==
- 5000 metres – 13:28.44 (2008)
- 10,000 metres – 27:48.03 (2007)
- 15 kilometres – 42:57 (2009)
- 20 kilometres – 57:47 (2011)
- Half Marathon – 1:00:55 (2011)
- 25 kilometres – 1:14:35 (2012)
- 30 kilometres – 1:29:04 (2012)
- Marathon – 2:07:04 (2012)
