= Benjamin Koech =

Kenyan long jumper

Personal information
- Nationality: Kenyan
- Born: 25 June 1969 (age 57)

Sport
- Sport: Athletics
- Event: Long jump
Medal record
Representing Kenya
African Games
Bronze medal – third place	1991 Cairo	Long jump

Benjamin Koech (born 25 June 1969) is a Kenyan athlete. He competed in the men's long jump at the 1992 Summer Olympics.
