= International Chiba Ekiden =

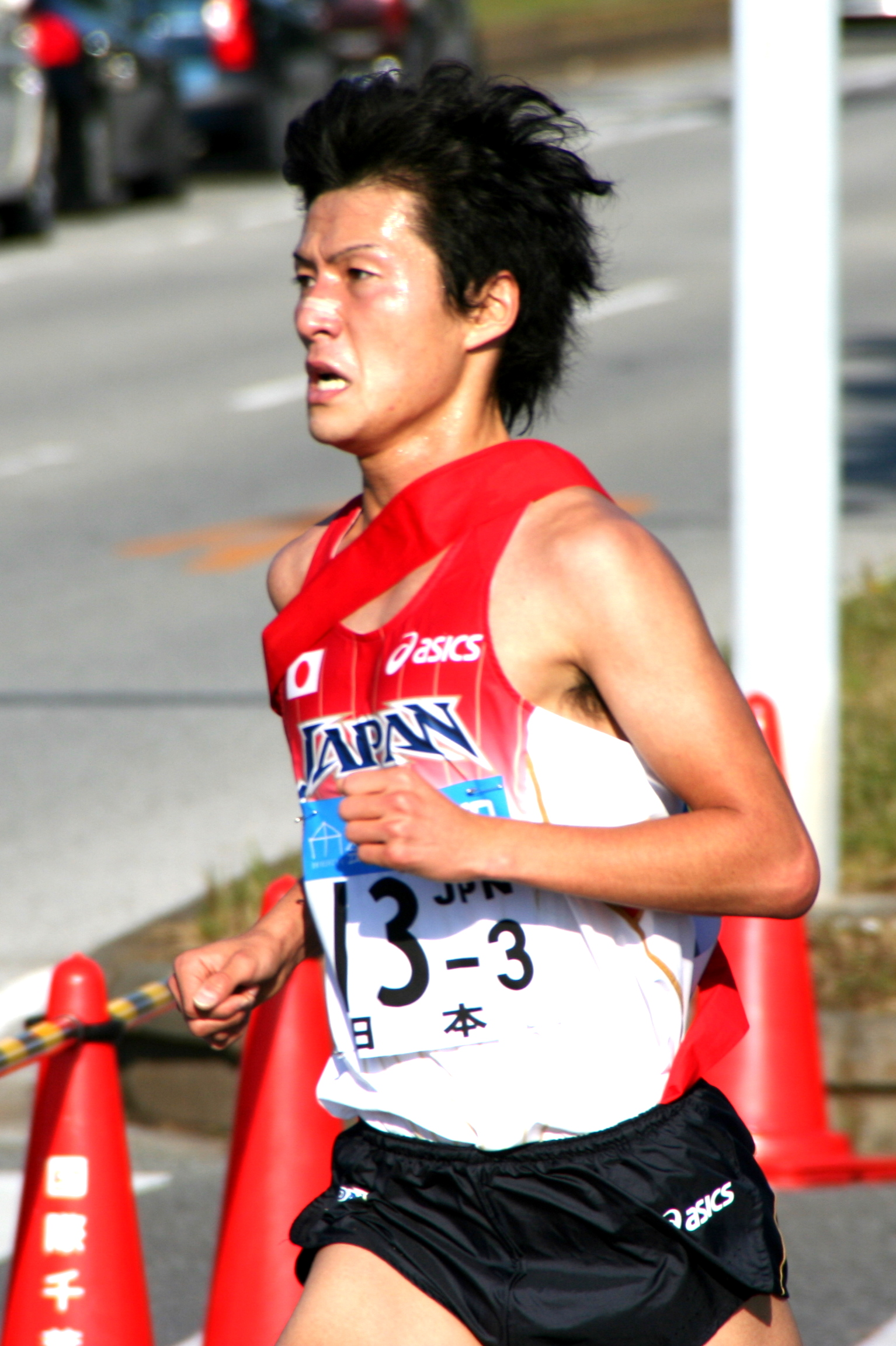
Japan's Kensuke Takezawa at the 2009 edition of the race.

The International Chiba Ekiden (国際千葉駅伝, Kokusai chiba ekiden) was an annual team road running competition held in Chiba, Japan in late November. The marathon relay race, or ekiden as it is known in Japan, is one of the prominent annual races of its kind. The competition is split into six legs which combine to make up the marathon distance of 42.195 km. The Chiba Ekiden was first held in 1988 and featured separate competitions for both men and women. Since 2007, each competing country selects three men and three women for their team. The legs are divided as follows: 5 km (men), 5 km (women), 10 km (men), 5 km (women), 10 km (men), and 7.195 km (women).

The men's world record for the event was set at the competition in 2005 as the Kenyan team of Josephat Ndambiri, Martin Mathathi, Daniel Mwangi, Mekubo Mogusu, Onesmus Nyerere and John Kariuki completed the course in a time of 1:57:06. In the same race the Japanese team ran an Asian record, the United States men ran a North American record and the fourth-placed Russian team broke the European record.

== Winners ==
Key: Stage winner

Men's and women's era
Year	Men	Women
1988	Ethiopia	New Zealand
1990	Japan	Romania
1991	Australia	Kenya
1992	Australia	Japan
1993	Morocco	Japan
1994	Ethiopia	Japan
1995	Australia	Japan
1996	South Africa	Japan
1997	Kenya	Japan
1998	Japan	Japan
1999	Japan	Japan
2000	Japan	Japan
2001	South Africa	Japan
2002	Ethiopia	Ethiopia
2003	Ethiopia	Ethiopia
2004	Ethiopia	Ethiopia
2005	Kenya; Josephat Ndambiri, Martin Mathathi; Daniel Mwangi, Mekubo Mogusu; Onesmus Nyerere and John Kariuki	Kenya; Philes Ongori, Evelyn Wambui ?, Catherine Ndereba ?, ?
2006	Kenya; Martin Mathathi, Gideon Ngatuny; Josephat Ndambiri, Sammy Korir; Mekubo Mogusu, Cyrus Njui	Kenya; Philes Ongori, Evelyne Kemunto Kimwei; Sally Kaptich Chepyego, Catherine Ndereba; Jane Wanjiku, Lucy Wangui

Mixed era
Year	Winner	Time	Athletes (stage winners)
2007	Japan	2:05:56	Yuichiro Ueno, Kayoko Fukushi, Kenji Noguchi, Megumi Kinukawa, Kensuke Takezawa, Yukiko Akaba
2008	Ethiopia	2:05:27	Ali Abdosh, Sule Utura, Dejen Gebremeskel, Belaynesh Fekadu, Hunegnaw Mesfin, Tsega Gelaw
2009	Japan	2:05:58	Yuichiro Ueno, Yuriko Kobayashi, Kensuke Takezawa, Yukiko Akaba, Atsushi Sato, Yurika Nakamura
2010	Japan Collegiate	2:07:52	Taku Fujimoto, Risa Takenaka, Yo Yazawa, Kasumi Nishihara, Shota Hiraga, Hanae Tanaka
2011	Kenya	2:04:40	Thomas Longosiwa, Lidia Mathathi, Patrick Mutunga Mwikya, Pauline Kahenya, Edwin Mokua, Pamela Lisoreng
2012	Kenya	2:05:06	Thomas Longosiwa, Gladys Cherono, Edwin Soi, Priscah Jeptoo, Philip Mosima, Joyce Chepkurui

Hanji Aoki Cup International Chiba Ekiden - 42.195 km - Stage Winners
	First.stage......5.0 km...........................	Second.stage......5.0 km.women....................	Third.stage......10.0 km..........................	Fourth.stage......5.0 km.women....................	Fifth.stage......10.0 km..........................	Sixth.stage......7.195 km.women.......................
2007	1. Moses Masai (KEN) - 13:22; 2. Yuichiro Ueno (Japan) - 13:29; 3. Ed Moran (USA) - 13:32	1. Emily Chebet (KEN) - 15:38; 2. Kayoko Fukushi (Japan) - 15:34; 3. Elena Zadorozhnaya (Russia) - 15:37	1. Barnaba Sigei (KEN) - 28:32; 2. Evgeny Rybakov (Russia) - 29:00; 3. Scott Bauhs (USA) - 28:31	1. Catherine Kirui (KEN) - 16:20; 2. Megumi Kinukawa (Japan) - 16:03; 3. Olesya Syreva (Russia) - 16:38	1. Joseph Birech (KEN) - 29:21; 2. Kensuke Takezawa (Japan) - 28:49; 3. Ryan Sheehan (USA) - 29:31	1. Yukiko Akaba (Japan) - 22:39; 2. Catherine Ndereba (KEN) - 23:53; 3. Lilia Shobukhova (Russia) - 23:15
2008	Ali Abdosh (ETH) - 13:34	Yuriko Kobayashi (Japan); 15:08 - new stage record	Dejen Gebremeskel (ETH); 28:20 - new stage record	Belaynesh Fikadu (ETH); 15:34 - new stage record	Hunegnaw Mesfin (ETH) - 28:54	Maria Konovalova (Russia) - 23:31
2009	Craig Mottram (Australia) - 13:23	Yuriko Kobayashi (Japan) - 15:09	Kensuke Takezawa (Japan) - 29:07	Yukiko Akaba (Japan); 15:34 - ties stage record	Atsushi Sato (Japan) - 28:57	Hikari Yoshimoto (Japan Univ. Select) - 23:12
2010	Yuichiro Ueno (JPN) - 13:23	Yuriko Kobayashi (JPN) - 15:27	Titus Mbishei (KEN) - 28:57	Kasumi Nishihara (JUT) - 16:02	Tsuyoshi Ugachi (JPN) - 28:51	Pauline Korikwiang (KEN) - 23:20
2011	1. Thomas Pkemei Longosiwa (KEN) - 13:36; 2. Egor Nikolaev (RUS) - 13:38; 3. Robert Cheseret (U.S.A.) - 13:38	1. Kasumi Nishihara (JPN) - 15:17; 2. Risa Takenaka (UNIV) - 15:36; 3. Lisa Corrigan (AUS) - 15:48	1. Patrick Mutunga Mwikya (KEN); 28:08 -new stage record 2. Evgeny Rybakov (RUS) - 28:42; 3. Kensuke Takezawa (JPN) - 28:53	1. Yuriko Kobayashi (JPN) - 15:46; 2. Hikari Yoshimoto (UNIV) - 15:49; 3. Elena Korobkina (RUS) - 16:21	1. Edwin Nyandusi Mokua (KEN); 27:43 - new stage record 2. Tetsuya Yoroizaka (JPN) - 28:47; 3. Bobby Mack (U.S.A.) - 28:55	1. Hitomi Niiya (JPN); 22:36 - new stage record 2. Pamela Chesopich Lisoreng (KEN) - 22:52; 3. Emily Brichacek (AUS) - 23:46

Hanji Aoki Cup International Chiba Ekiden - 42.195 km -
	First.Place......................	Second.Place.....................	Third.Place......................	Fourth.Place.....................	Fifth.Place......................	Sixth.Place......................	Seventh.Place....................	Eight.Place......................	Ninth.Place......................	Tenth.Place......................	Eleventh.Place...................	Twelfth.Place....................
2007	Japan - 2:05:56	Kenya - 2:07:06	Russia - 2:08:00	USA - 2:09:05	Japan University Select - 2:09:22	Great Britain - 2:10:11	Australia - 2:11:56	Chiba Prefecture - 2:11:57	Romania - 2:12:17	China - 2:13:59	Belarus - 2:14:32	Poland - 2:15:10
2008	Ethiopia - 2:05:27 new course record	Japan - 2:06:39	Russia - 2:08:04	Japanese University Select - 2:08:47	Australia - 2:09:36	Chiba Prefecture - 2:10:00	Great Britain - 2:10:12	U.S.A. - 2:11:54	Canada - 2:11:56	China - 2:12:11	Sweden - 2:12:16	Brazil - 2:14:15
2009	Japan - 2:05:58	Japanese University Select - 2:07:47	Kenya - 2:08:34	Chiba (Japan) Prefecture - 2:09:26	U.S.A. - 2:09:42	Russia - 2:11:19	Australia - 2:11:35	Canada - 2:12:24	Italy - 2:13:13	Romania - 2:14:28	China - 2:14:47	Belarus - 2:15:11
2010	Japan University Select - 2:07:52	Kenya - 2:08:06	Japan - 2:08:12	Russia - 2:09:35	U.S.A. - 2:10:54	Chiba Prefecture - 2:12:56	Australia - 2:14:07	Italy - 2:14:55	Romania - 2:15:02	Canada - 2:15:13	Czech Republic - 2:15:23	Norway - 2:17:01
2011	Kenya - 2:04:40 - CR	Japan - 2:04:59 (CR)	Japanese University Select- 2:07:26	Russia - 2:07:56	U.S.A. - 2:09:06	Australia - 2:09:56	Chiba Prefecture - 2:11:55	Poland - 2:12:53	Romania - 2:13:39	Canada - 2:13:52	New Zealand - 2:14:37	Czech Republic - 2:16:33

== See also ==
- Chiba International Cross Country, another prominent athletics competition in the city
