= Kensuke Takezawa =

Japanese long-distance runner

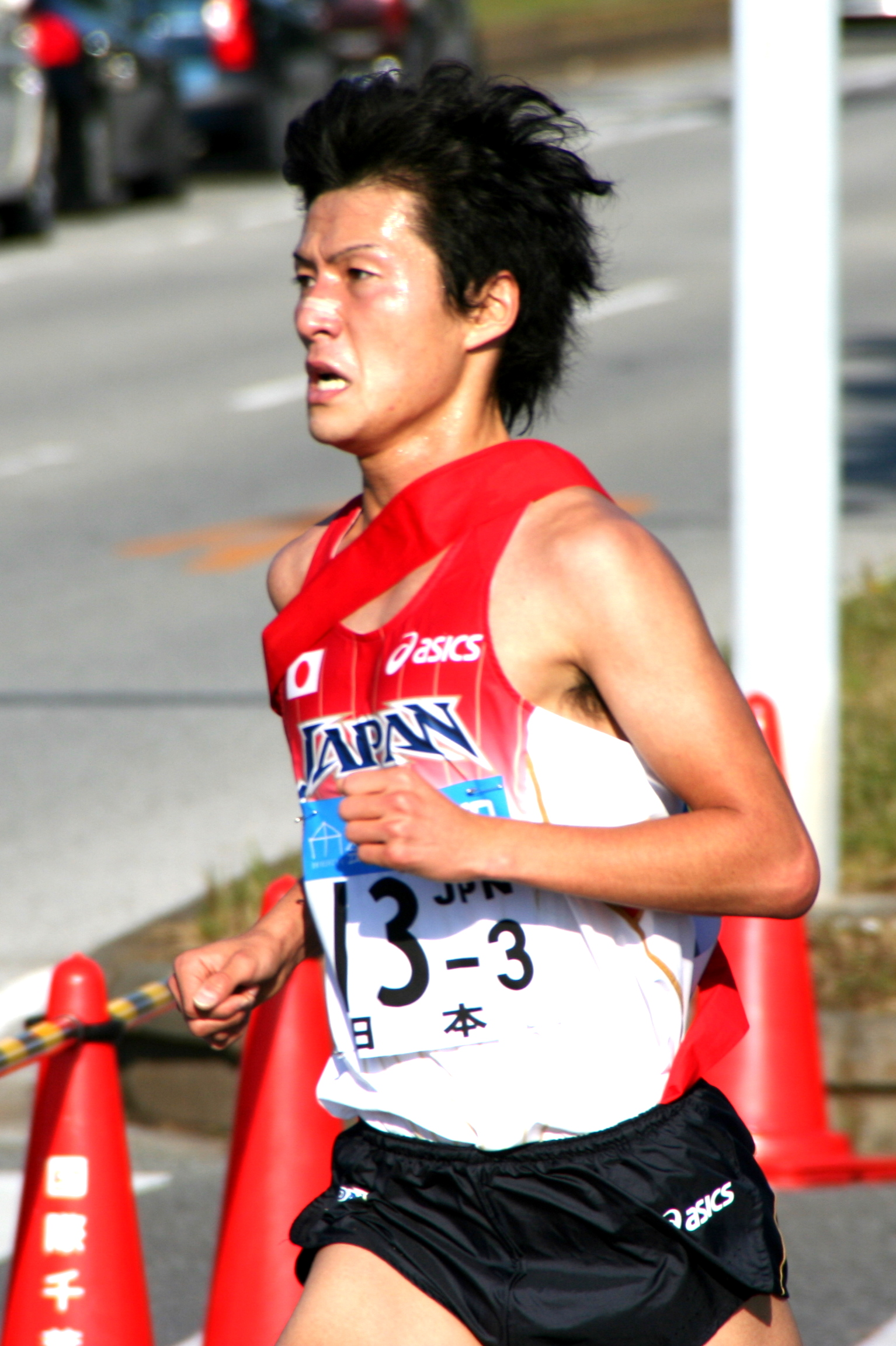
Kensuke Takezawa at the 2009 International Chiba Ekiden.

Kensuke Takezawa (竹澤 健介, Takezawa Kensuke; born October 11, 1986 in Himeji, Hyogo, Japan) is a Japanese professional long-distance runner. He attended Waseda University in Tokyo.

His international debut came at the 2006 IAAF World Cross Country Championships in Fukuoka, where he was 49th in the men's long race. In 2007 he was second over 10,000 metres at the Japanese Athletics Championships then equalled the Japanese collegiate record over 5000 m at the KBC Night of Athletics (running a time of 13:19.00 minutes). He finished twelfth in the 10,000 m at the 2007 World Championships. Takezawa was runner-up in the 5000 m at the 2008 Japanese nationals and was selected for the Japanese Olympic team: he ran in the first round of the 5000 m and finished twenty-eighth in the 10,000 m at the men's 10,000 metres.

At the 2009 East Asian Games he won the 10,000 m gold medal – his first win on the international stage. That year he was again the 5000 m runner-up at the Japanese Championships and placed fourth over the distance at the 2009 Asian Athletics Championships. He won his first national title in 2010, taking the 10,000 m honours, and placed sixth in the 5000 m at the 2010 Asian Games. He was part of the Japanese team for the International Chiba Ekiden race in 2011 and helped the team to finish second overall.

He began 2012 with a run at the Inter-Prefectural Men's Ekiden, where he won the final stage to take the title for Hyōgo Prefecture.

== Personal bests ==
- 3000 metres - 7:49.26 min (2009)
- 5000 metres - 13:19.00 min (2007)
- 10,000 metres - 27:45.59 min (2007)
- Half marathon - 1:02:26 hrs (2006)
