= Moitalel Naadokila =

Kenyan athlete

Personal information
- Full name: Moitalel Mpoke Naadokila
- Born: 8 February 2001 (age 25) Nairobi, Kenya

Sport
- Country: Kenya
- Sport: Athletics
- Event: 400m hurdles
- College team: Texas A&M Aggies

Achievements and titles
- Personal bests: 48.70 (Eugene, 2021)
Medal record
Men's athletics
Representing Kenya
World U18 Championships
Silver medal – second place	2017 Nairobi	400 m hurdles

Moitalel Mpoke Naadokila (born 8 February 2001) is a Kenyan athlete who competes in the 400m hurdles. He represented Kenya at the 2022 World Athletics Championships.

== Career ==
Competing in Nairobi, he won the silver medal in the 400m hurdles at the 2017 IAAF World U18 Championships, running a personal best time of 52.06 metres to finish behind Sokwakhana Zazini of South Africa.

In 2019, while studying at South Plains College in the United States, he achieved NJCAA All-American honours by placing third in the 400m hurdles running 51.12. Then, in 2020 he was the NJCAA National Champion in the 600m and 800m.

In May 2021 he achieved qualification for the delayed 2020 Tokyo Olympics as he clocked 48.89 seconds to win the 400m hurdles during the South Eastern Conference Outdoor Championships at the E.B Cushing Stadium in Texas, competing for Texas A&M University. In doing so he became the first athlete in the history of the university to run a sub 49 seconds in the 400m hurdles. He lowered his personal best to 48.70 seconds in finishing fourth at the 2021 NCAA Outdoor Championships in Eugene, Oregon. However, he was unable to compete at the Olympics later in the year as he had not been part of the dope testing programme expected from an athlete from the Kenyan federation.

In December 2021, he ran a personal best for the 600 metres indoors for the Texas Aggies, running 1:16.92 to finish runner-up to Brandon Miller.

In July 2022, he competes in the men's 400 metres hurdles at the 2022 World Athletics Championships in Eugene, Oregon, where he qualified for the semi-finals before he finished sixth in his semi-final heat in 49.34 seconds, two seconds behind the winner, Brazilian Alison Dos Santos.

He was runner-up to Wiseman Mukhobe in the 400m hurdles at the 2024 Kenyan Olympic Trials in June 2024.
