= Michael Saruni =

Kenyan middle-distance runner

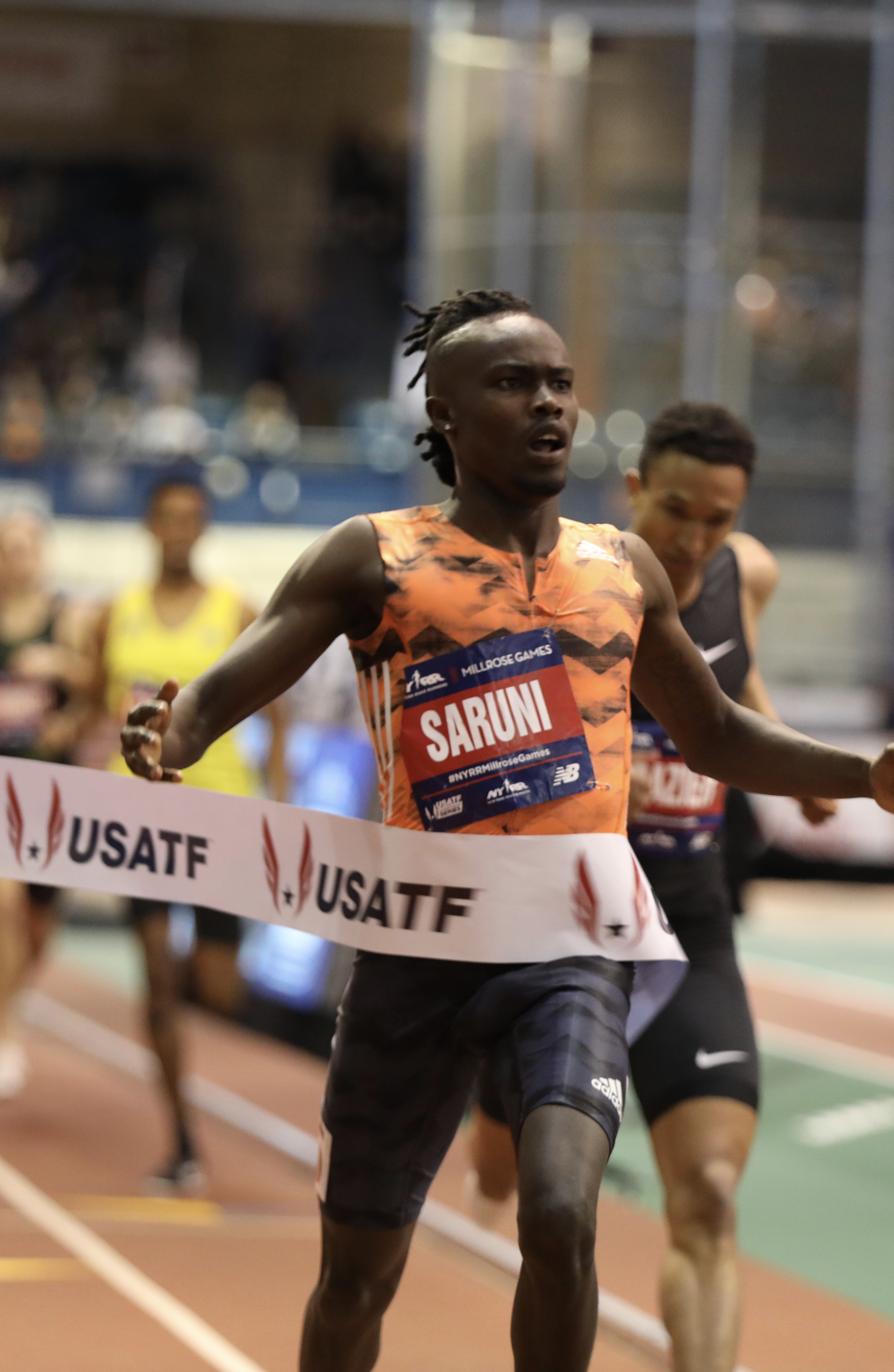
- Saruni at the 2019 Millrose Games

Personal information
- Nationality: Kenya
- Born: June 18, 1995 (age 31) Eldama Ravine, Kenya
- Height: 5 ft 10 in (178 cm)

Sport
- Sport: Track and field
- Events: 800 metres 1500 metres
- College team: UTEP

Michael Saruni (born June 18, 1995) is a Kenyan collegiate middle-distance runner. He was the former world record holder for the indoor 600 m with a time of 1:14.79, set in January 2018. Representing the University of Texas in El Paso, he also set the all-time collegiate record for 800 m in April 2018, with a time of 1:43.25.

Michael Saruni graduated from Kabimoi High School in Baringo County - Eldama Ravine, Kenya.

In 2017 NCAA Division I Indoor Track and Field Championships 800 meters final, Saruni won in 1:47, but was disqualified after bumping Piazza who cut into lane 1 in front of Saruni.

In 2017 NCAA Division I Outdoor Track and Field Championships 800 final, champion Emmanuel Korir tripped Saruni at 600 meters.

Saruni was controversially excluded from the Kenyan 2017 World Championships team by Athletics Kenya due to a misunderstanding of IAAF policies.

In 2018 NCAA Division I Indoor Track and Field Championships 800 meters final, Saruni won in 1:45.15.

Michael Saruni, a sophomore UTEP Miners (University of Texas El Paso), set the NCAA 800 meters record at the 2018 Desert Heat Classic in Tucson, Arizona in 1:43.25 improving NCAA 800 m record of Donavan Brazier (1:43.55 in 2016).

In 2018 NCAA Division I Outdoor Track and Field Championships 800 meters final, Saruni placed 3rd in 1:45.31.

He qualified to represent Kenya at the 2020 Summer Olympics.

In 2022, Saruni was given a provisional suspension for anti-doping rules violations. He has been suspended for 4 years in 2024.

== Competitions ==
Year	Competition	Venue	Position	Event	Notes
Representing University of Texas at El Paso
2016	Conference USA Cross Country Championships	Frank Liske Park Concord, North Carolina	6th	8000 m	24:16.2
2016	2016 NCAA Division I Cross Country Championships	LaVern Gibson Championship; Cross Country Course; Terre Haute, Indiana	228th	10,000 m	32:08
2017	Conference USA Indoor Track and Field Championships	Birmingham Metro CrossPlex	1st	800 meters	1:50.67
2017	Conference USA Indoor Track and Field Championships	Birmingham Metro CrossPlex	1st	Mile	4:03.32
2017	NCAA Men's Division I Indoor Track and Field Championships	College Station, Texas	DQ 1st	800 m	DQ 1:47.48
2017	NCAA Men's Division I Indoor Track and Field Championships	College Station, Texas	11th	DMR	9:56.03
2017	Conference USA Outdoor Track and Field Championships	El Paso, Texas	1st	800 meters	1:47.48
2017	Conference USA Outdoor Track and Field Championships	El Paso, Texas	2nd	1500 m	3:46.15
2017	NCAA Men's Division I Outdoor Track and Field Championships	Eugene, Oregon	8th	800 m	2:15.56 (Tripped @ 600 m)
2017	NCAA Men's Division I Outdoor Track and Field Championships	Eugene, Oregon	24th	4 × 400 m	3:18.65
Representing Athletics Kenya
2017	2017 Athletics Kenya World Championship Trials	Nairobi, Kenya	3rd	800 m	1:44.61
2017	IAAF World Championships in Athletics	London, United Kingdom	DNS	800 m	DNS
Representing University of Texas at El Paso
2018	Conference USA Indoor Track and Field Championships	Birmingham Metro CrossPlex	1st	800 meters	1:52.05
2018	Conference USA Indoor Track and Field Championships	Birmingham Metro CrossPlex	2nd	Mile	4:10.39
2018	NCAA Men's Division I Indoor Track and Field Championships	College Station, Texas	1st	800 m	1:45.15
2018	Conference USA Outdoor Track and Field Championships	Rice University	2nd	800 meters	1:49.71
2018	Conference USA Outdoor Track and Field Championships	Rice University	2nd	1500 m	3:50.09
2018	NCAA Men's Division I Outdoor Track and Field Championships	Eugene, Oregon	3rd	800 m	1:45.31
