= Josephat Ndambiri =

Kenyan long-distance runner (born 1985)

Personal information
- Born: 12 February 1985 (age 41)
- Education: Ryutsu Keizai University

Sport
- Country: Kenya
- Sport: Long-distance running
- Event(s): 5000 metres, 10000 metres, Half marathon, Marathon
- Club: PACE Sports Management

Josephat Muchiri Ndambiri (born 12 February 1985) is a Kenyan long-distance runner. He represented his country at the World Championships in Athletics in 2007.

He is based in Japan and trains with PACE Sports Management. He moved to Japan as a teenager on an athletic scholarship and specialised in long-distance track running, including the 5000 metres and 10,000 metres. He competed for, and graduated from, Ryutsu Keizai University.

At the 2005 Sapporo Half Marathon, he led for the first half of the race but had faded to fourth by the finish point. At the end of the year he represented Kenyan in the International Chiba Ekiden. Running the marathon distance with a relay team of Martin Mathathi, Daniel Mwangi, Mekubo Mogusu, Onesmus Nyerere and John Kariuki, he helped set a world record time of 1:57:06 hours for the popular Japanese event. Ndambiri won a second Chiba Ekiden title with Kenya the following year, where he won his 5-kilometre leg by a margin of over twenty seconds.

He won the 10,000 metres at the Kenyan Championships in 2007 and in his major international debut he finished fifth in the event at the 2007 World Championships. A month after his world appearance, he took a 5000/10,000 m double at the Japan Corporate Team Track & Field Championships. He attempted to gain selection for the 2008 Summer Olympics, but ended the trials in seventh and was not picked for the squad. Representing the Komori Corporation, he ran in the New Year Ekiden and won his 8.3 km stage. In the 2009 track season he became the first athlete to run the 10,000 m under 27 minutes on Japanese soil, taking the win at the Shizuoka International in an all-comers record of 26:57.36 minutes.

He came seventh at the RAK Half Marathon in 2010, setting a personal best of 1:01:07 hours. The following year he came fourth over 10,000 m at the Hyogo Relays and then claimed third place at the Sapporo Half Marathon in June. He made his debut over the marathon distance in December 2011 and made a successful transition by taking the Fukuoka Marathon title in a time of 2:07:36 hours.

== Personal bests ==
- 1500 metres - 3:38.72 min (2004)
- 3000 metres - 7:42.98 min (2006)
- 5000 metres - 13:05.33 min (2005)
- 10,000 metres - 26:57.36 min (2009)
- Half marathon - 1:01:07 hrs (2010)
- Marathon - 2:07:36 hrs (2011)
