= Daniel Muchunu Mwangi =

Kenyan long-distance runner (born 1984)

Daniel Mwangi
Personal information
- Full name: Daniel Muchunu Mwangi
- Born: 1984 (age 41–42)

Sport
- Sport: Long-distance running
- Event(s): 5000 metres, 10,000 metres, Half marathon

Achievements and titles
- Personal bests: 5000 metres: 13:18.21 (Hiroshima 2005); 10000 metres: 28:05.30 (Kumagaya 2007); Half marathon: 1:03:10 (Sapporo 2008); Marathon: 2:14:13 (Fukuoka 2008)

Daniel Muchunu Mwangi (born 1984) is a Kenyan long-distance runner. He is a joint world record holder for the ekiden marathon relay race.

== Biography ==
He gained an athletic scholarship as a teenager to train and study in Japan. In 2003 he ran bests of 13:38.70 minutes and 28:13.34 minutes for the 5000 metres and 10,000 metres, respectively. He also ran at the Sapporo Half Marathon that year and came eighth in a personal best time of 1:03:16 hours. He improved his 5000 m best to 13:29.18 minutes in the 2004 season. He improved this further in 2005, running 13:18.21 minutes. He had two consecutive wins over the distance at the Oda Memorial in 2006 and 2007.

At the 2005 New Year Ekiden, he ran for the JAL AGS corporate team and won the first stage, completing the distance just one second short of Martin Mathathi's record. The 2005 International Chiba Ekiden in November saw Mwangi help break the world record for the ekiden marathon relay race as part of a Kenyan team including Josephat Ndambiri, Martin Mathathi, Mekubo Mogusu, Onesmus Nyerere and John Kariuki. He returned to the New Year Ekiden race in 2006 and again won the first leg for JAL AGS.

In 2008 he switched to marathon running and made his debut at the Beppu-Ōita Marathon. He fell over and lost a shoe mid-race but rejoined the leading pack and eventually finished in fifth place with a time of 2:14:28 hours. His second outing over the distance came at the Fukuoka Marathon and his run of 2:14:13 hours was a little faster, but this was only enough for twelfth place. He has not competed since this race.
