= John Kariuki =

Kenyan long-distance runner (born 1986)

Personal information
- Born: 10 November 1986 (age 39)

Sport
- Sport: Long-distance running
- Event(s): 5000 metres, 10,000 metres, Half marathon

Achievements and titles
- Personal bests: 3000 metres: 7:51.21 (Haruno 2002); 5000 metres: 13:12.12 (Hiroshima 2005); 10000 metres: 27:14.84 (Oita 2006); 10 miles: 45:24 (Kosa 2007); Half marathon: 1:03:16 (Kumamoto 2015)

John Kariuki (born 10 November 1986) is a Kenyan former long-distance runner.

At the age of 14 he emigrated to Japan, where he attended Shiga Gakuen High School. After graduating from school, he started competing professionally for the Toyota Boshoku team.

He was a member of the team that set the world record for the Ekiden road relay on 23 November 2005 in the International Chiba Ekiden. The team, which consisted of Kariuki alongside Josephat Ndambiri, Martin Mathathi, Daniel Muchunu Mwangi, Mekubo Mogusu and Onesmus Nyerere, finished in a time of 1:57:06.
