= Onesmus Nyerere =

Kenyan long-distance runner (born 1983)

Personal information
- Born: 10 November 1983 (age 42) Nyamira, Kenya

Sport
- Sport: Long-distance running
- Event(s): 10K, Half marathon, Marathon

Achievements and titles
- Personal bests: 10K: 28:53 (Dongen 2005); Half marathon: 1:03:28 (Nairobi 2006); Marathon: 2:14:31 (Düsseldorf 2008)

Onesmus Nyerere (born 10 November 1983) is a Kenyan former long-distance runner.

He was a member of the team that set the world record for the Ekiden road relay on 23 November 2005 in the International Chiba Ekiden. The team, which consisted of Nyerere alongside Josephat Ndambiri, Martin Mathathi, Daniel Muchunu Mwangi, Mekubo Mogusu and John Kariuki, finished in a time of 1:57:06.

He ran his personal best time of 2:14:31 hours in the marathon at the Düsseldorf Marathon in 2008, where he finished 9th.
