= Mekubo Mogusu =

Kenyan long-distance runner (born 1986)

Personal information
- Born: 25 December 1986 (age 39)
- Education: Yamanashi Gakuin University

Sport
- Country: Kenya
- Sport: Long-distance running
- Events: 10000 metres, Half marathon

Mekubo Job Mogusu (born 25 December 1986) is a Kenyan long-distance runner who specialises in road running, particularly the half marathon. An emigrant to Japan, he has won the Sapporo Half Marathon on three occasions and the Kagawa Marugame Half Marathon twice – he is the course record holder for both of the races. Mogusu was also part of the Kenyan ekiden marathon relay team which set the world record time of 1:57:06 at the 2005 Chiba Ekiden. He has a half marathon best of 59 minutes and 48 seconds and competed at the 2008 IAAF World Half Marathon Championships.

== Career ==
Mogusu emigrated to Japan as a youth and attended high school before moving on to Yamanashi Gakuin University. The decision to continue his studies further, rather than begin running professionally, confused his Kenyan peers. However, Mogusu emphasised the importance of continuing to compete in ekiden marathon road relay at college level, under the guidance of the university coach Ueda. He had his first major circuit win in July 2005 when he won the Sapporo Half Marathon, recording a personal best time of 1:01:28 and beating Olympic medallist Erick Wainaina among others. Further success came in December when he teamed up with Josephat Ndambiri, Martin Mathathi, Daniel Mwangi, Onesmus Nyerere and John Kariuki to run at the Chiba Ekiden. Running the fourth leg of 10 km, Mogusu extended the Kenyan team's lead with a time of 27:56, helping the team to a new world record time of 1:57:06 for the marathon road relay event. He continued to have success in ekiden competitions, being defeated only once in nine races and recording stage records on five occasions.

He attempted to defend his Sapporo Half Marathon title in 2006, but managed only fourth place, almost a minute behind winner Cyrus Gichobi Njui. He made a breakthrough in February the following year, winning the Kagawa Marugame Half Marathon in a course record time of 59:48 – his first half marathon clocking under an hour. He continued his winning streak to take a second title at the Sapporo Half Marathon. He set another course record and his finishing time of 59:54 was the first sub-60-minute run of the course's 23-year history. His last road race of 2007 was the Ichinoseki International Half Marathon, which he won in another sub-hour clocking of 59:58.

In 2008 he competed in the Middle-East for the first time, taking fifth place and at the high-stakes Ras Al Khaimah Half Marathon with a season's best of 1:00:35. Mogusu won at the Kanto University Track and Field Championships, beating Daniel Gitau and recording a 10,000 metres personal best of 27:27.64 – a championship record and within the Olympic "A" standard for the distance. He did not make the Olympic team but he continued winning on the road racing circuit, leading the Sapporo Half Marathon from the 4 km onwards to take his third victory on the course. He was selected for the Kenyan team at the 2008 IAAF World Half Marathon Championships, but he failed to finish the race in Rio de Janeiro.

At the 2009 Kagawa Marugame Half Marathon, only Daniel Gitau challenged Mogusu, but his front-running tactics prevailed as he maintained his lead to the finish to win his second title with a time of 1:00:37. Mogusu was driving in his native Kenya in March 2009 when he became involved in a car crash. While he, Daniel Gitau and Cosmas Ondiba were uninjured, their new Team Aidem coach Sho Kimura was hospitalised. Guilt and shock over the incident interrupted Mogusu's training that year. He set a 10,000 m track best of 27:26.56 in Niigata in May 2009. He made plans to make his marathon debut at the Fukuoka Marathon in 2009, but he dropped out at around the 30 km mark.

He was runner up at the Kagawa Marugame race in February (losing to Daniel Gitau) and was again the second-placer at the Sendai Half Marathon in May, running 1:01:34 to finish behind Martin Mathathi. His third appearance over the distance that year came at the Sapporo Half Marathon, but finished out of the top three and had to settle for fifth place. He made his marathon debut at the Hokkaido Marathon in August. Although he led the race at the 35 km point, he faded in the latter stages and finished in third place, recording 2:16:38 on the hot and humid course.

He took an early lead at the Marugame Half Marathon in February 2011, but slowed and ended up in third. The opposite occurred at the Sapporo race in June as he overtook runners in the second half of the race to claim a clear second place. He finished second again in Sapporo the following year, placing behind Martin Mathathi.

== Personal bests ==
Event	Time (m:s)	Venue	Date
5000 m	13:27.14	Tokyo, Japan	15 May 2005
10,000 m	27:26.56	Niigata, Japan	31 May 2009
Half marathon	59:48	Marugame, Japan	4 February 2007
Marathon	2:16:38	Sapporo, Japan	28 August 2010

- All information taken from IAAF profile.
