= Martin Mathathi =

Kenyan long-distance runner (born 1985)

Personal information
- Born: 25 December 1985 (age 40) Nyahururu, Kenya
- Education: Sipili secondary school

Sport
- Country: Kenya
- Sport: Long-distance running
- Events: 5000 metres, 10000 metres, Half marathon, Marathon
- Club: PACE Sports Management
Medal record
Representing Kenya
Men's athletics
World Championships
Bronze medal – third place	2007 Osaka	10,000 m

Martin Irūngū Mathathi (born 25 December 1985 in Nyahururu) is a Kenyan long-distance runner, who competes in track, cross country and road running events. Mathathi won the bronze medal in the 10,000 metres at the 2007 World Championships in Osaka. He represented his country in the same event at the 2008 Summer Olympics. He holds the 10 miles world junior record of 44:51.

He trains with PACE Sports Management. He was schooled at Sipili secondary school.

Mathathi was the 2010 winner of the men's short race at the Chiba Cross Country in Japan. He won the Sendai Half Marathon in a personal best time of 59:48 minutes, easily beating second placed Mekubo Mogusu.

He gained selection for the 2011 World Championships in Athletics and came fifth for Kenya in the men's 10,000 m. That year, Mathathi set a course record for the Great North Run half marathon, finishing in a time of 58 minutes 56 seconds. Two weeks later he also won the Great Edinburgh Run 10K in course record time. At the start of 2012 he finished second at the Chiba Cross Country meet. He won the 10,000 m at the Hyogo Relays with a world-leading time of 27:35.16 minutes, but said that he intended to miss the Olympics and focus on a marathon debut at the Fukuoka Marathon instead. He won the Gifu Half Marathon for a second time in May and won the Sapporo Half Marathon in July.

Mathathi attempted to run the fastest marathon debut at the Fukuoka Marathon but he dropped out of the race after 38 km. He attempted to extend his undefeated streak at the Gifu Half Marathon and although he finished in 1:00:54 hours he was runner-up to world champion Zersenay Tadese.

== Achievements ==
Year	Competition	Venue	Position	Notes
2005	World Championships	Helsinki, Finland	5th	10,000 m
2006	World Cross Country Championships	Fukuoka, Japan	3rd	Long race
2006	World Cross Country Championships	Fukuoka, Japan	1st	Team competition
2007	World Championships	Osaka, Japan	3rd	10,000 m
2008	Olympic Games	Beijing, China	7th	10,000 m
2011	World Championships	Daegu, South Korea	5th	10,000 m
2013	Fukuoka Marathon	Fukuoka, Japan	1st	Marathon

=== Personal bests ===
- 5000 metres - 13:03.84 min (2004)
- 10,000 metres - 26:59.88 min (2009)
- Half marathon - 58:56 min (2011)
- Marathon - 2:07:16 (2013)
