= Mao Ichiyama =

Japanese long-distance runner

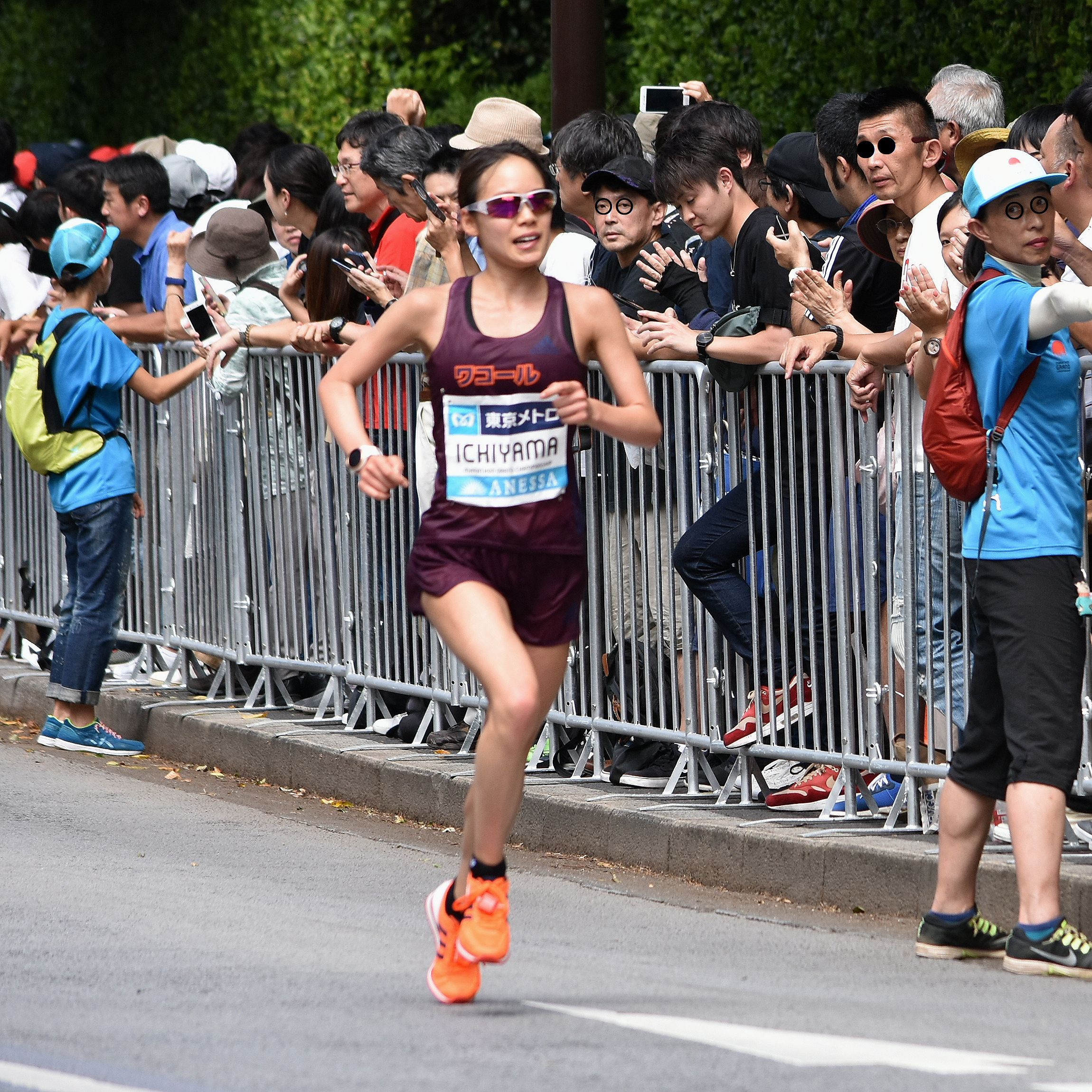
- Mao Ichiyama at the 2019 Japan's Marathon Grand Championship

Personal information
- Native name: 一山 麻緒
- Nicknames: Mao-chan, Ichichi
- Born: 29 May 1997 (age 29) Izumi, Kagoshima Prefecture, Japan
- Education: Izumi Central High School
- Height: 1.58 m (5 ft 2 in)
- Weight: 43 kg (95 lb)

Sport
- Country: Japan
- Sport: Track and field
- Event: 1500 metres – Marathon
- Club: Wacoal (ワコール)
- Team: Adidas (to 2020); Nike (2020 — )
- Turned pro: 2016

Achievements and titles
- Personal bests: 1500 m: 4:28.35; 3000 m: 8:53.54; 5000 m: 15:24.17; 10,000 m: 31:34.56; 10 km: 32:24; Half marathon: 1:08:49; Marathon: 2:20:29 (2020 Nagoya Women's Marathon)

Mao Ichiyama (一山 麻緒, Ichiyama Mao; born 29 May 1997 in Izumi, Kagoshima Prefecture, Japan) is a Japanese long-distance runner. She represented Japan at the 2020 Tokyo Olympics.

== Running career ==
Ichiyama is winner of 2017 Fukuoka International Cross Country (8 km in 26:46) and 2020 Nagoya Women's Marathon in 2:20:29 thus beating 2:21:47 time of Mizuki Matsuda (2020 Osaka International Women's Marathon) to enter as third participant to 2020 Tokyo Olympics, together with Honami Maeda and Ayuko Suzuki. She won 2021 Osaka Women's Marathon with new event record 2:21:11.

== Footwear ==
Mao Ichiyama was sponsored by Adidas. From 2020 Nagoya Women's Marathon she is sponsored by Nike, where she made her Marathon personal best.

== International competitions ==
Key: Personal best

| Year | Competition | Venue | Position | Event | Notes |
Representing Japan
| 2017 | Rock 'n' Roll Virginia Beach Half Marathon | Virginia Beach, United States | 1st | Half Marathon | 1:13:49 |
| 2017 | Sanyo Women's Half Marathon | Okayama, Japan | 3rd | Half Marathon | 1:09:14 |
| 2018 | World Half Marathon Championships | Valencia, Spain | 19th | Half Marathon | 1:11:02 |
| 2018 | BOLDERBoulder 10k | Boulder, United States | 8th | 10 km | 34:10 |
| 2018 | KBC Night of Athletics | Heusden-Zolder, Belgium | 19th | 5000 m | 15:45.56 |
| 2019 | Kagawa Marugame International Half Marathon | Marugame, Japan | 6th | Half marathon | 1:10:49 |
| 2019 | Tokyo Marathon | Tokyo, Japan | 7th | Marathon | 2:24:33 |
| 2019 | London Marathon | London, United Kingdom | 17th | Marathon | 2:27:27 |
| 2019 | Hakodate Marathon | Hakodate, Japan | 1st | Half marathon | 1:08:49 |
| 2020 | Kagawa Marugame International Half Marathon | Marugame, Japan | 5th | Half marathon | 1:08:56 |
| 2020 | Nagoya Women's Marathon | Nagoya, Japan | 1st | Marathon | 2:20:29 |
| 2021 | Osaka Women's Marathon | Osaka, Japan | 1st | Marathon | 2:21:11 |
| 2021 | Olympic Games | Sapporo, Japan | 8th | Marathon | 2:30:13 |
| 2022 | Tokyo Marathon | Tokyo, Japan | 6th | Marathon | 2:21:02 |
| 2024 | Olympic Games | Paris, France | 51st | Marathon | 2:34:13 |
