= Izumi =

Origin
- Region of origin: Japanese

Izumi (泉), meaning "spring" or "source of water", is a Japanese given name and surname. It is sometimes translated as "fountain" in reference to natural springs and should not be confused with architectural fountains, which are called funsui (噴水) in Japanese. While a unisex name, it is more commonly used by women. It can alternately be written as 泉美, 和泉, 泉水, いずみ or いづみ.

== As given name ==
- Izumi Aki (いずみ; born 1960), actress
- Izumi Arai (泉; born 1964), stage name Minami Takayama, voice actress and singer
- Izumi Ashikawa (芦川 いずみ; born 1935), Japanese actress
- Izumi Eto (江藤 泉; born 1935), Japanese sprint canoeist
- Izumi Hoshi (泉; born 1967), Tibetologist
- Izumi Inamori (いずみ; born 1972), actress
- Izumi Kato (和; born 1990), Japanese swimmer
- Izumi Kato (泉; born 1969), contemporary artist
- Izumi Kazuto (いずみ; born 1979), manga artist
- Izumi Kimura (born 1973), pianist
- Izumi Kirihara (いづみ, born), manga artist
- Izumi Kitta (いずみ; born 1984), actress and singer
- Izumi Kobayashi (泉美; born 1977), professional Go player
- Izumi Kobayashi (泉美; born 1957), musician and businesswoman
- Izumi Matsumoto (泉; born 1958), real name Kazuya Terashima, manga artist
- Izumi Mori (泉; born 1982), model and tarento
- Izumi Motoya (和泉; born 1974), real name Motohisa Yamawaki, Kyōgen actor
- Izumi Ochiai (泉; born 1966), founder member of the Japanese band Aion
- Izumi Nakadai (born 1988), member of Bon-Bon Blanco
- Izumi Nakamitsu (泉; born 1963), United Nations official
- Izumi Sakai (泉水; 1967–2007), real name Sachiko Kamachi, singer
- Izumi Shima (いづみ; born 1953), real name Keiko Ishida, actress
- Izumi Shimada (泉; born 1948), American anthropologist
- Izumi Suzuki (いづみ; born 1949), Japanese novelist and actor
- Izumi Tabata (泉; born 1956), health scientist, founder of the Tabata protocol
- Izumi Takemoto (泉; born 1959), manga artist and illustrator
- Izumi Tsubaki (いづみ), manga artist
- Izumi Yamaguchi (いづみ), actress
- Izumi Yokokawa (泉; born 1963), football player
- Izumi Yoshida (吉田 泉; born 1949), Japanese politician
- Izumi Yukimura (いづみ; born 1937), singer and actress
- Princess Izumi (泉; died 734), princess during the Asuka period and Nara period

== As surname ==
- Arata Izumi (和泉; born 1982), Japanese-born Indian footballer
- Bob Izumi (born 1958), Canadian angler
- Hiroshi Izumi (泉; born 1982), judoka and mixed martial artist
- Izumi Maki (athlete) (和; born 1968), former long-distance runner
- Kaneyoshi Izumi (和泉), manga artist
- Keisuke Izumi (泉 圭輔; born 1997), Japanese baseball player
- Kyōka Izumi (泉; 1873–1939), author
- Masaki Izumi (born 1961), Japanese shogi player
- Masako Izumi (1947–2025), Japanese actress, singer and adventurer
- Masanobu Izumi (泉; born 1944), former football player
- Masayuki Izumi (泉; 1980–2015), actor
- Miyuki Izumi (泉; born 1973), football player
- Pinko Izumi (泉; born 1947), real name Sayo Takemoto (née Eguchi), actress and singer
- Rika Izumi (泉; born 1988), fashion model and gravure idol
- Ryuji Izumi (和泉; born 1993), football player
- Shigechiyo Izumi (泉; 1880–1986), previously verified by Guinness to be the oldest man ever, but whose case is now disputed
- Izumi Shikibu (和泉; born 978), mid Heian period poet, member of the Thirty-Six Immortals of Poetry
- Sayoko Izumi (泉, born 1988), singer-songwriter
- Shigeru Izumi (泉 茂; 1922–1995), Japanese painter and printmaker
- Shūhei Izumi (和泉; born 1977), actor
- Shinya Izumi (泉; born 1937), politician
- Shiro Izumi (和泉; born 1961), actor
- Sohji Izumi (和泉; born 1988), actor
- Takura Izumi (泉; born 1948), archaeologist
- Tokuji Izumi (泉; born 1939), Supreme Court of Japan member

== Fictional characters ==
=== Characters with the given name ===
- Izumi, the current Fire Lord of the Fire Nation, from Avatar: The Last Airbender
- Izumi (Shelly), a member of Team Aqua in the Pokémon anime
- Izumi, a character from anime Parasol Henbe
- Doll Izumi, a character in Super Doll Licca-chan
- Izumi Akazawa, a character in Another
- Izumi Chiba, a character in Natsunagu!
- Izumi Curtis, a character in Fullmetal Alchemist
- Izumi Himuro, a character in Princess Nine
- Izumi Izosaki, a character in I"s
- Izumi Kanai, a character in Battle Royale
- Izumi Katsuragi (泉), a character in Link! Like! Love Live!
- Izumi Maki, a character in Soar High! Isami
- Izumi Miyama, a character in Ultraman Leo
- Izumi Miyamura, main character in Horimiya
- Izumi Moriyama, a character in Ultraman Taro
- Izumi Nase, a character in Kyoukai no Kanata
- Izumi Orimoto (Zoe Orimoto in all English dubs), a character in Digimon Frontier
- Izumi Sakurai, a character from the anime and manga series Nichijou
- Izumi Sano (泉), a character in Hanazakari no Kimitachi e
- Izumi Sawatari (いずみ), a character in He Is My Master
- Izumi Segawa, a character in Hayate the Combat Butler
- Izumi Sena, a character in Ensemble Stars!
- Izumi Sena (泉水), a character in Love Stage!!
- Izumi Shimomura, a character In Ajin: Demi-Human
- Izumi Rio (いずみ), a character in Full Moon o Sagashite
- Izumi Toraishi, a character in Star-Myu
- Izumi Uchiha, a character in Naruto Shippuden
- Izumi Yukitaka, a character in Haikyuu!!

=== Characters with the surname ===
- Ako Izumi, a character in Negima! Magister Negi Magi
- Eita Izumi, a character in Just Because!
- Gaku Izumi, a character in Flunk Punk Rumble
- Hina Izumi, a character in Kamen Rider OOO
- Kagura Izumi, one of the protagonists of the Ressha Sentai ToQger
- Kaori Izumi, a character in Best Student Council
- Ken Izumi, the protagonist of the toon Chargeman Ken!
- Kohei Izumi, a character in World Trigger
- Konata Izumi (泉), protagonist of Lucky Star
- Kota Izumi, a character in My Hero Academia
- Koushiro "Izzy" Izumi, a character in Digimon Adventure
- Kyōka Izumi, a character in "Bungo Stray Dogs"
- Sagiri Izumi, the protagonist of Eromanga Sensei
- Shion Izumi, a character in Gantz
- Shinichi Izumi (泉), the protagonist of the series Parasyte
- Mitsuki Izumi and Iori Izumi, the members of Idolish7 in Idolish7
- Noa Izumi, protagonist of Patlabor
- Yuu Izumi, protagonist of "Kawaii dake ja Nai Shikimori-san"
