= Sally Chepyego Kaptich =

Kenyan long-distance runner

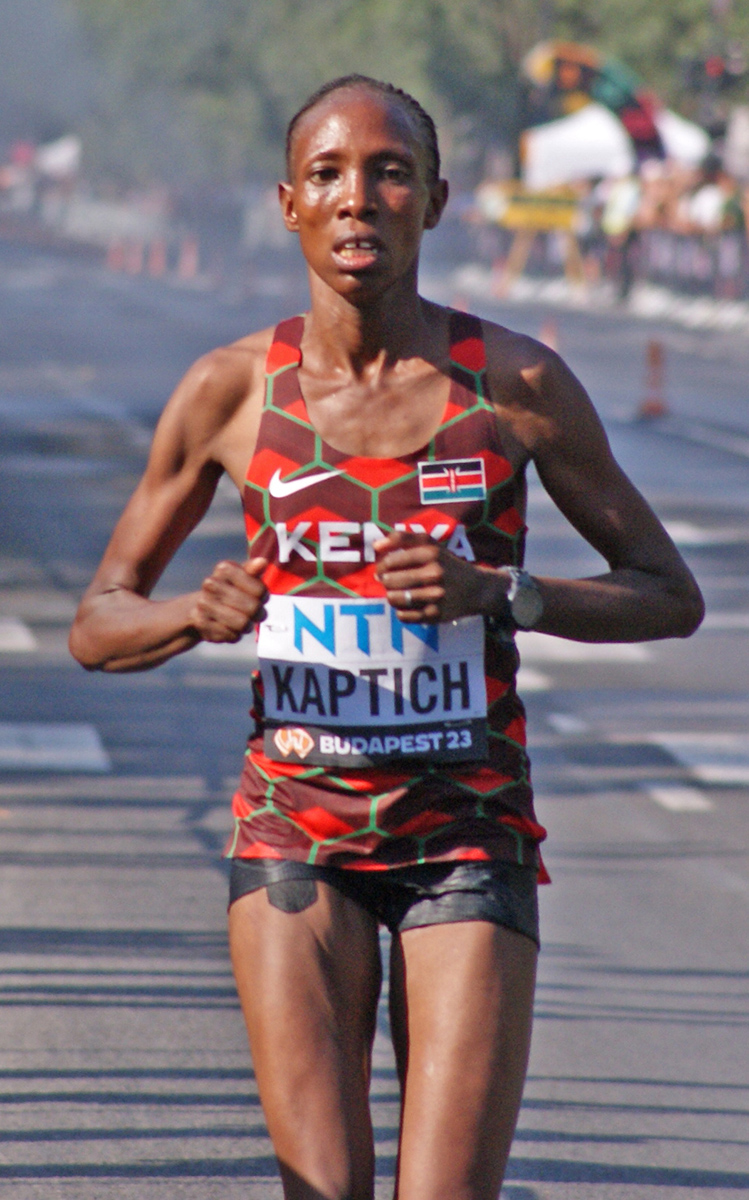

Sally Chepyego Kaptich (Japanese: シェリー・チェピエゴ; born 3 October 1985) is a Kenyan long-distance runner who competes mainly in track and road running events.

She established herself at the World Youth Championships in Athletics in 2001, winning the 3000 metres title. She moved to Japan several years later to compete for the Kyudenko running team. She has won several corporate track running titles for the team.

Chepyego has twice represented Kenya as a senior athlete: first at the 2006 International Chiba Ekiden, where she broke an African record, and then at the 2013 World Championships in Athletics, where she placed seventh in the 10,000 metres.

Chepyego is currently part of the NN Running Team, an international team of elite long-distance runners managed by Global Sports Communication in Nijmegen, Netherlands.

== Career ==
Born near Keiyo District in Kenya's Rift Valley Province, Chepyego's first success came at the 2001 World Youth Championships in Athletics where, running barefoot, she held off Ethiopia's Mestewat Tufa to win the gold medal in the 3000 metres. She competed only at local competitions for the next few years and was the 2004 Rift Valley High Schools champion. At age nineteen, she placed third at the North Rift Valley championships.

In 2006, she emigrated to Japan to take up professional running. She gained her first international selection soon after for the International Chiba Ekiden. Running in a team of Philes Ongori, Evelyne Kemunto Kimwei, Catherine Ndereba, Jane Wanjiku Gakunyi and Lucy Wangui Kabuu, she won the race and helped break the African record for the marathon ekiden distance. The following year she competed on the Japanese track circuit and won the Miyazaki 5K run. She did not compete in 2008 and changed location for the 2009 season, entering a series of road races in Europe. Her best performances were a win at the Würzburg half marathon, third at the Kö-Lauf in a personal best 33:41 minutes, and a fourth-place finish at the Hamburg Half Marathon in another best of 75:27 minutes.

Chepyego returned to running in Japan in 2010. After a runner-up finish at the Baringo 15K, she won the end-of-year Sanyo Women's 10K. She signed up with the Kyudenko corporate running team in 2011 and performed well on the track circuit, almost going undefeated that season with wins at the Oda Memorial, Hokuren Shibetsu Meet, Japan Corporate Track and Field Championships and the Hyogo Relays. Her sole defeat on the track came at the Nobeoka Golden Games, where she was runner-up to Ann Karindi. On the roads she set a new best of 72:03 minutes to place second to Florence Kiplagat at the Sapporo Half Marathon. She improved to 69:58 minutes at the Sanyo Women's Half Marathon, although that time was only enough for third as race winner Yukiko Akaba set a new course record. Chepyego was Kyudenko's top performer at the All-Japan Women's Corporate Ekiden Championships.

In 2011, Chepyego took a 5000 metres/10,000 metres double at the Japan Corporate Championships, but failed in her aim to make the 10,000 m team for Kenya at the 2012 Summer Olympics. She was runner-up at the Sanyo 10K that year. She focused on the track event in 2013 and was rewarded with her first major international selection. After winning the 10,000 m at the Hyogo Relays, she placed third at the Kenyan trials. This earned her a place at the 2013 World Championships in Athletics. In the final she ran a personal best of 31:22.11 minutes, which brought her seventh place overall. She won the Sanyo Half Marathon in December, setting a personal best and course record time of 68:24 minutes.

== Competition record ==
Year	Competition	Venue	Position	Event	Notes
2001	World Youth Championships	Debrecen, Hungary	1st	3000 metres	
2013	World Championships	Moscow, Russia	7th	10,000 metres	
