= Akemi Matsuno =

Japanese long-distance runner

- 松野 明美
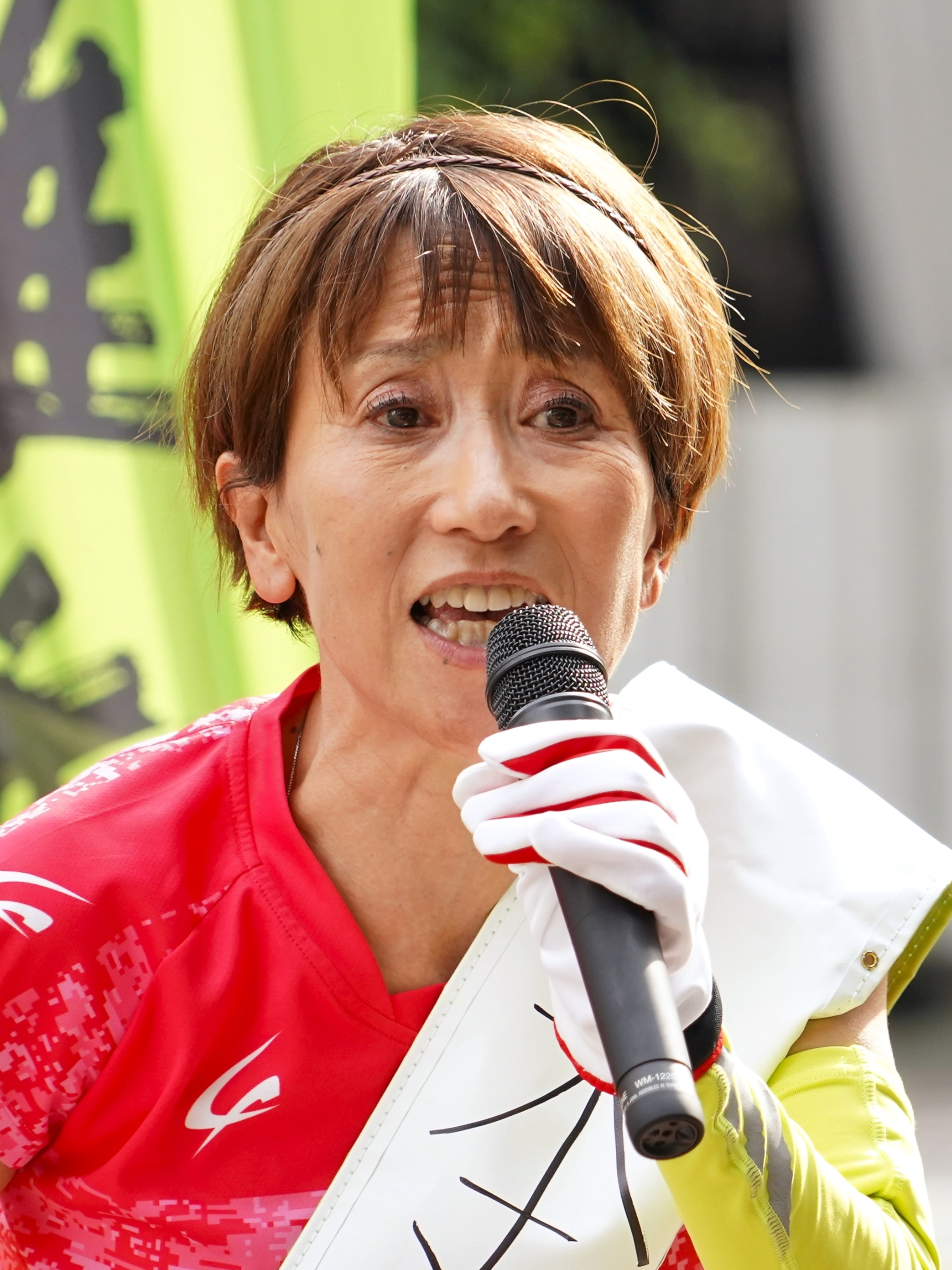
- Matsuno in 2022

Member of the House of Councillors
- Incumbent
- Assumed office 26 July 2022
- Constituency: National PR

Member of the Kumamoto Prefectural Assembly
- In office 30 April 2015 – 22 April 2022
- Constituency: Kumamoto City 1st

Member of the Kumamoto City Council
- In office 2010 – 3 April 2015

Personal details
- Born: 27 April 1968 (age 58) Ueki, Kumamoto, Japan
- Party: Innovation (since 2022)
- Other political affiliations: Independent (2010–2022)

Akemi Matsuno (松野 明美, Matsuno Akemi) (born April 27, 1968) is a politician and retired long-distance runner from Japan.

Matsuno was born in Ueno, Kumamoto Prefecture. She finished ninth in the women's 10,000m track event at the 1988 Summer Olympics in Seoul. In 1989 she set the Japanese women's record in the 10,000m event. She finished second to Yumi Kogamo in the Osaka International Women's Marathon in 1992. After her sports career, she served as a member of the Kumamoto City Council and the Kumamoto Prefectural Assembly. In 2022 she was elected to the National Diet as a Councillor (Senator).

== International competitions ==
Year	Competition	Venue	Position	Event	Notes
Representing Japan
1988	Olympic Games	Seoul, South Korea	22nd	10,000 m	32:19.57
1990	Asian Games	Beijing, China	3rd	10,000 m	31:56.93
1993	World Championships	Stuttgart, Germany	11th	Marathon	2:38:04
