= 1990 Boston Marathon =

Footrace in Boston, Massachusetts, USA

- Venue: Boston, United States
- Dates: April 16

Champions
- Men: Gelindo Bordin (2:08:19)
- Women: Rosa Mota (2:25:24)

The 1990 Boston Marathon was the 94th running of the annual marathon race in Boston, United States, which was held on April 16. The elite men's race was won by Italy's Gelindo Bordin in a time of 2:08:19 hours and the women's race was won by Portugal's Rosa Mota in 2:25:24.

A total of 7950 runners finished the race, 6516 men and 1434 women.

== Results ==
=== Men ===
| Position | Athlete | Nationality | Time |
|---|---|---|---|
| 1st place, gold medalist(s) | Gelindo Bordin | Italy | 2:08:19 |
| 2nd place, silver medalist(s) | Juma Ikangaa | Tanzania | 2:09:52 |
| 3rd place, bronze medalist(s) | Rolando Vera | Ecuador | 2:10:46 |
| 4 | John Campbell | New Zealand | 2:11:04 |
| 5 | Robert de Castella | Australia | 2:11:28 |
| 6 | Isidro Rico | Mexico | 2:13:02 |
| 7 | Geoffrey Smith | United Kingdom | 2:13:38 |
| 8 | Salah Qoqaiche | Morocco | 2:13:53 |
| 9 | Futoshi Shinohara | Japan | 2:14:10 |
| 10 | Philip O'Brien | United Kingdom | 2:14:21 |
| 11 | Tesfaye Tafa | Ethiopia | 2:14:29 |
| 12 | Gerry Curtis | Ireland | 2:14:37 |
| 13 | Peter Maher | Canada | 2:15:25 |
| 14 | Darrell General | United States | 2:15:28 |
| 15 | Thomas Eickmann | West Germany | 2:15:51 |
| 16 | Osamu Monoe | Japan | 2:16:02 |
| 17 | Kjell-Erik Ståhl | Sweden | 2:16:19 |
| 18 | Art Boileau | Canada | 2:16:26 |
| 19 | Steve Spence | United States | 2:16:40 |
| 20 | Delmir Alves Dos Santos | Brazil | 2:16:44 |
| 21 | Ryszard Marczak | Poland | 2:16:44 |
| 22 | Rich McCandless | United States | 2:16:56 |
| 23 | Joseph Leuchtmann | United States | 2:17:25 |
| 24 | Mario Cuevas | Mexico | 2:17:30 |
| 25 | Vincent Ruguga | Uganda | 2:17:46 |

=== Women ===
| Position | Athlete | Nationality | Time |
|---|---|---|---|
| 1st place, gold medalist(s) | Rosa Mota | Portugal | 2:25:24 |
| 2nd place, silver medalist(s) | Uta Pippig | East Germany | 2:28:03 |
| 3rd place, bronze medalist(s) | María Trujillo | United States | 2:28:53 |
| 4 | Kamila Gradus | Poland | 2:28:56 |
| 5 | Kim Jones | United States | 2:31:01 |
| 6 | Véronique Marot | United Kingdom | 2:31:09 |
| 7 | Zoya Ivanova | Soviet Union | 2:31:15 |
| 8 | Ritva Lemettinen | Finland | 2:38:44 |
| 9 | Dimitra Papaspirou | Greece | 2:38:45 |
| 10 | Anne Roden | England | 2:39:36 |
| 11 | Jane Welzel | United States | 2:42:04 |
| 12 | Chie Matsuda | Japan | 2:42:14 |
| 13 | Christa Vahlensieck | West Germany | 2:42:18 |
| 14 | Cindy New | Canada | 2:44:18 |
| 15 | Gillian Horovitz | United Kingdom | 2:45:00 |
| 16 | Janine Aiello | United States | 2:45:02 |
| 17 | Cesarina Taroni | Italy | 2:46:32 |
| 18 | Chiemi Saito | Japan | 2:47:28 |
| 19 | Jane Hutchison | United States | 2:47:55 |
| 20 | Kristin Larson | United States | 2:49:13 |
| 21 | Judith Hine | New Zealand | 2:49:30 |
| 22 | Junko Kawakami | Japan | 2:50:04 |
| 23 | Christine Gibbons | United States | 2:50:09 |
| 24 | Maureen Griffith | Canada | 2:50:40 |
| 25 | Mary Wood | United States | 2:51:09 |
