= Ruth Wanjiru =

Kenyan long-distance runner

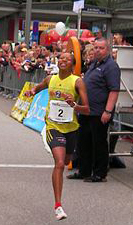
- Wanjiru seen right, as number 2 in a yellow vest

Personal information
- Nationality: Kenyan
- Born: 11 September 1981 (age 44) Nyeri, Kenya
- Updated on 26 October 2013

Ruth Wanjiru Kuria (born 11 September 1981) is a Kenyan professional long-distance runner who competes in marathon and half marathon races. She has a personal best of 2:27:38 hours for the longer distance (set in 2009) and was the 2013 winner of the Eindhoven Marathon.

Wanjiru spent her early career in Japan, running for Hitachi, then Second Wind AC and regularly competed on the road circuit there. She represented her country at the 2009 Yokohama International Women's Ekiden.

== Career ==
Wanjiru gained an athletic scholarship in Japan at Sendai Ikue High School (renowned for sports) as a teenager and moved there to study and improve her running. She was a contemporary of Samuel Wanjiru, the 2008 Olympic champion, at the school. Initially she focused on middle- and long-distance track running; in her first year in Japan she won the high school title over 3000 metres. Following her graduation she moved in the corporate running system and began competing for Hitachi. At that year's Japan Corporate Track and Field Championships she set track bests of 15:43.05 minutes for the 5000 metres and 32:34.71 minutes for the 10,000 metres. Her fifth place finish at the Sapporo Half Marathon in 70:15 minutes was another best for the Kenyan. She improved her track bests further to 15:31.49 and 31:56.21 minutes in 2003.

She claimed her first big win at the Sanyo Women's Half Marathon in 2004. She improved her best in the half marathon event two years later to 70:04 minutes at the Miyazaki Women's Half Marathon, placing third. She had two road wins in 2006 at the Kasumigaura 10 Miles and the Shibetsu Half Marathon. She was eighth at the high-profile Miyazaki Half at the start of 2007. In November 2007 she won the Hakusan half marathon before making her debut over the full marathon distance at the Shanghai Marathon (marking the start of her competing outside Japan). At that race she successfully transitioned and finished fourth in a time of 2:43:16 hours. She was a little slower at the Nagano Marathon the next year, finishing tenth. In both 2008 and 2009, she placed third at the Sanyo Women's Half Marathon.

Wanjiru began running for Second Wind AC and in 2009 she competed in her first European races. She began that year with a significant personal best at the Osaka Ladies Marathon, running 2:27:38 hours for seventh place in a competitive field At the final edition of the Yokohama International Women's Ekiden she helped the Kenyan women to second place behind the Japanese. She was runner-up at the Hannover Marathon and Hamburg Half Marathon that year.

After a two-year break from the sport in 2010 and 2011 she returned with a third place finish at the 2012 Ottawa Marathon and a runner-up placing at the Ljubljana Marathon. In her two outings of 2013 she was only fifth at the Ottawa race, but had her first major European win at the Eindhoven Marathon.

Wanjiru served a 16-month competition ban from January 2018 to May 2019 issued by the Athletics Integrity Unit.
