= Hokkaido Marathon =

Annual race in Sapporo, Japan

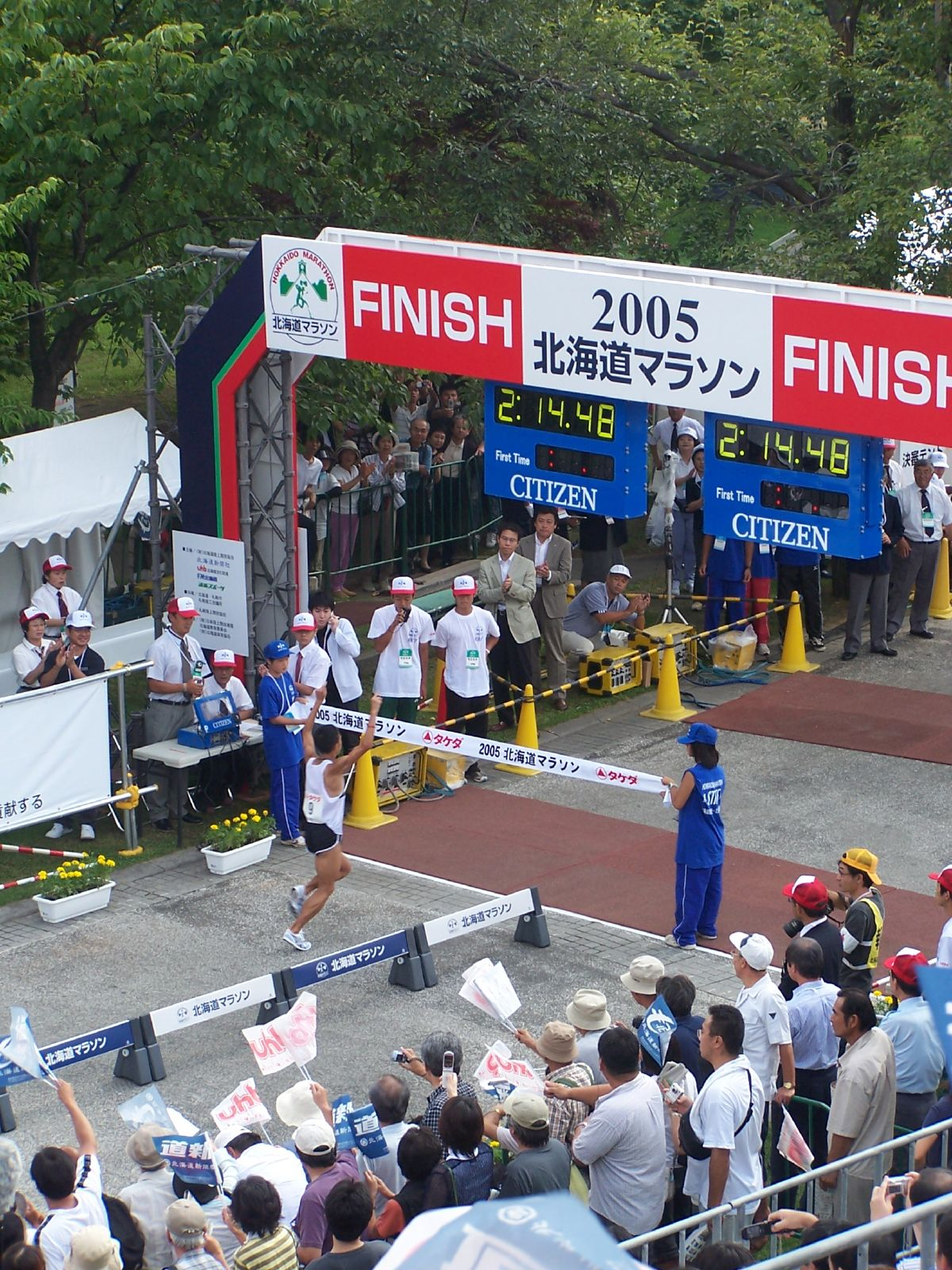
- Tomonori Watanabe winning the men's 2005 edition
- Date: August
- Location: Sapporo, Japan
- Event type: Road
- Distance: Marathon
- Established: 1987
- Course records: Men's: 2:10:13 (1998) (Ethiopia) Ambesse Tolosa; Women's: 2:25:10 (2009) (Japan) Kiyoko Shimahara
- Website: Official website

The Hokkaido Marathon held in Sapporo, Hokkaidō, Japan, is one of the prominent marathon races of the year.

The staging area as well as both the start and finish lines are in Odori Park starting between Nishi 3-chome and Nishi 4-chome and the finishing at Nishi 8-chome. The course is sanctioned by both the Japan Association of Athletics Federations (JAAF) and AIMS, meaning it is eligible for world record performances.

== History ==
The Hokkaido Marathon was first held in 1987 with 439 entrants and 380 starters.

In 2009, the time limit was increased to 5 hours.

For the 2012 edition of the race, the start was moved from Nakajima Park to Odori Park.

In 2013, the number of finishers of the full marathon exceeded 10,000 for the first time.

The 2020 edition of the race was cancelled because the marathon usually took place in August, while the marathon event of the Tokyo 2020 Summer Olympics was scheduled to take place in Sapporo that August as well. (Note: The Olympic marathon event was moved from Tokyo to Sapporo due to concerns about heat. The Paralympic marathon events, however, were to remain in Tokyo.) Logistical issues, such as a likely shortage of staff to organize the marathon due to the Paralympics taking place around the same time, and the short timeframe in which the areas used by the Olympic marathon would have to be reset for the Hokkaido Marathon, led to the decision to cancel the marathon. (Note: The Olympic and Paralympic Games were later postponed due to the coronavirus pandemic.)

== Winners ==
Key: Course record

Edition	Year	Men's Winner	Time (h:m:s)	Women's Winner	Time (h:m:s)
1st	6 September 1987	Fedor Ryzhov (URS)	2:24:28	Lutsia Belyayeva (URS)	2:42:17
2nd	4 September 1988	Masayuki Nishi (JPN)	2:17:11	Jane Welzel (USA)	2:40:53
3rd	27 August 1989	Hiromi Taniguchi (JPN)	2:13:16	Lorraine Moller (NZL)	2:36:39
4th	26 August 1990	Futoshi Shinohara (JPN)	2:15:32	Lisa Rainsberger (USA)	2:31:29
5th	4 August 1991	Koichi Fujita (JPN)	2:17:05	Lorraine Moller (NZL)	2:33:20
6th	30 August 1992	Michael Scout (RSA)	2:16:38	Olga Appell (MEX)	2:30:22
7th	29 August 1993	Tadesse Gebre (ETH)	2:15:34	Nobuko Fujimura (JPN)	2:33:10
8th	28 August 1994	Erick Wainaina (KEN)	2:15:03	Olga Appell (USA)	2:36:31
9th	27 August 1995	Tadesse Gebre (ETH)	2:15:07	Yuko Arimori (JPN)	2:29:17
10th	25 August 1996	Biruk Bekele (ETH)	2:14:26	Tomoe Abe (JPN)	2:31:21
11th	31 August 1997	Erick Wainaina (KEN)	2:13:45	Chihiro Ogura (JPN)	2:33:30
12th	30 August 1998	Ambesse Tolosa (ETH)	2:10:13	Eri Yamaguchi (JPN)	2:27:36
13th	29 August 1999	Masahiro Matsumoto (JPN)	2:12:08	Kazumi Matsuo (JPN)	2:32:14
14th	27 August 2000	Dionicio Cerón (MEX)	2:17:14	Mayumi Ichikawa (JPN)	2:32:30
15th	26 August 2001	Tsutomu Sassa (JPN)	2:13:45	Masako Chiba (JPN)	2:30:39
16th	25 August 2002	Samson Kandie (KEN)	2:15:12	Chika Horie (JPN)	2:26:11
17th	31 August 2003	Erick Wainaina (KEN)	2:13:13	Chihiro Tanaka (JPN)	2:34:11
18th	29 August 2004	Laban Kagika (KEN)	2:12:20	Masako Chiba (JPN)	2:26:50
19th	28 August 2005	Tomonori Watanabe (JPN)	2:14:49	Masako Chiba (JPN)	2:25:46
20th	27 August 2006	Tomonori Watanabe (JPN)	2:17:51	Kaori Yoshida (JPN)	2:32:53
21st	9 September 2007	Julius Gitahi (KEN)	2:17:26	Yuri Kanō (JPN)	2:30:43
22nd	31 August 2008	Masaru Takamizawa (JPN)	2:12:10	Yukari Sahaku (JPN)	2:31:50
23rd	30 August 2009	Daniel Njenga (KEN)	2:12:03	Kiyoko Shimahara (JPN)	2:25:10
24th	29 August 2010	Cyrus Njui (KEN)	2:11:22	Yumiko Hara (JPN)	2:34:12
25th	28 August 2011	Harun Mbugua (KEN)	2:14:10	Tomo Morimoto (JPN)	2:33:45
26th	26 August 2012	Yuki Kawauchi (JPN)	2:18:38	Yuri Yoshizumi (JPN)	2:39:07
27th	25 August 2013	Koji Gokaya (JPN)	2:14:26	Yuko Watanabe (JPN)	2:29:13
28th	31 August 2014	Shigeki Tsuji (JPN)	2:15:24	Azusa Nojiri (JPN)	2:30:26
29th	30 August 2015	Arata Fujiwara (JPN)	2:16:49	Yui Okada (JPN)	2:32:10
30th	28 August 2016	Ryo Kiname (JPN)	2:13:16	Kaori Yoshida (JPN)	2:32:33
31st	27 August 2017	Akinobu Murasawa (JPN)	2:14:48	Honami Maeda (JPN)	2:28:48
32nd	26 August 2018	Okamoto Naomi (JPN)	2:11:29	Ayuko Suzuki (JPN)	2:28:32
33rd	25 August 2019	Ryo Matsumoto (JPN)	2:12:57	Mirai Waku (JPN)	2:33:44
	2020	cancelled due to conflict with Olympic and Paralympic Games			
	2021	Not held			
34th	28 August 2022	Luka Musembi (KEN)	2:10:49	Haruka Yamaguchi (JPN)	2:29:52
35	27 August 2023	Patrick Mazenge Wambui (KEN)	2:20:54	Tomomi Sawabata (JPN)	2:38:18
36	25 August 2024	Shogo Nakamura (JPN)	2:15:36	Pauline Kamulu (KEN)	2:31:04

== See also ==
- Sapporo Half Marathon
