= Tokuji (given name) =

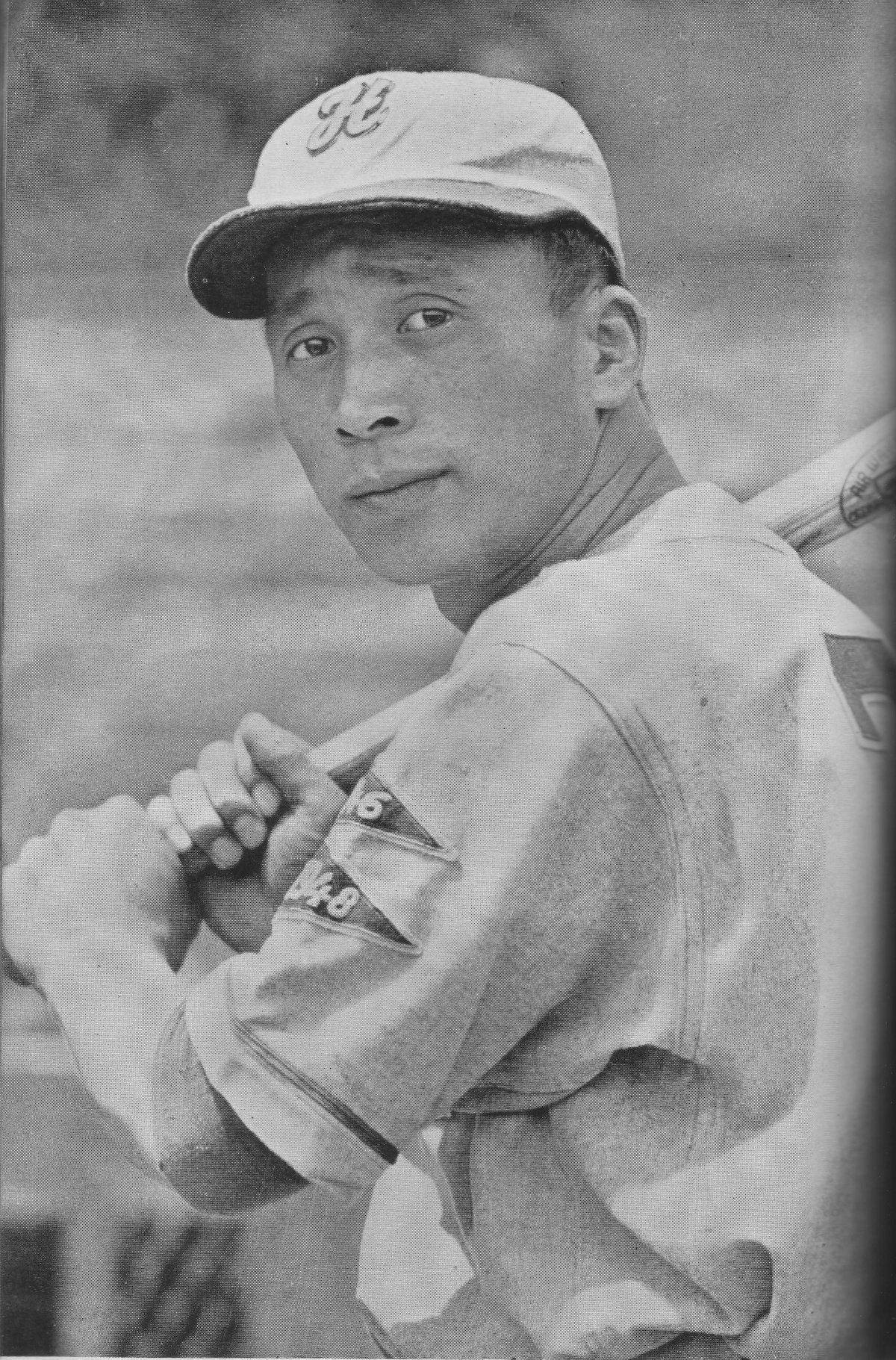
- Tokuji iida (1924–2000), Japanese baseball player and manager
- Pronunciation: tokɯdʑi (IPA)
- Gender: Male

Origin
- Origin: Japanese
- Meaning: Different meanings depending on the kanji used

Other names
- Alternative spelling: Tokuzi (Kunrei-shiki) Tokuzi (Nihon-shiki) Tokuji (Hepburn)

Tokuji is a masculine Japanese given name.

== Written forms ==
Tokuji can be written using different combinations of kanji characters. Some examples:

- 徳次, "benevolence, next"
- 徳治, "benevolence, manage/cure"
- 徳二, "benevolence, two"
- 徳児, "benevolence, child"
- 徳爾, "benevolence, you"
- 徳慈, "benevolence, mercy"
- 得次, "gain, next"
- 得治, "gain, manage/cure"
- 得二, "gain, two"
- 篤次, "sincere, next"
- 竺次, "bamboo, next"
- 啄次, "peck, next"

The name can also be written in hiragana とくじ or katakana トクジ.

== Notable people with the name ==
- Tokuji Hayakawa (早川 徳次; 1894–1981), Japanese businessman
- Tokuji Iida (飯田 徳治; 1924–2000), Japanese baseball player and manager
- Tokuji Izumi (泉 德治; born 1939), Japanese judge
- Tokuji Wakasa (若狭 得治; 1914–2005), Japanese businessman
