= Yuri Kanō =

Japanese long-distance runner

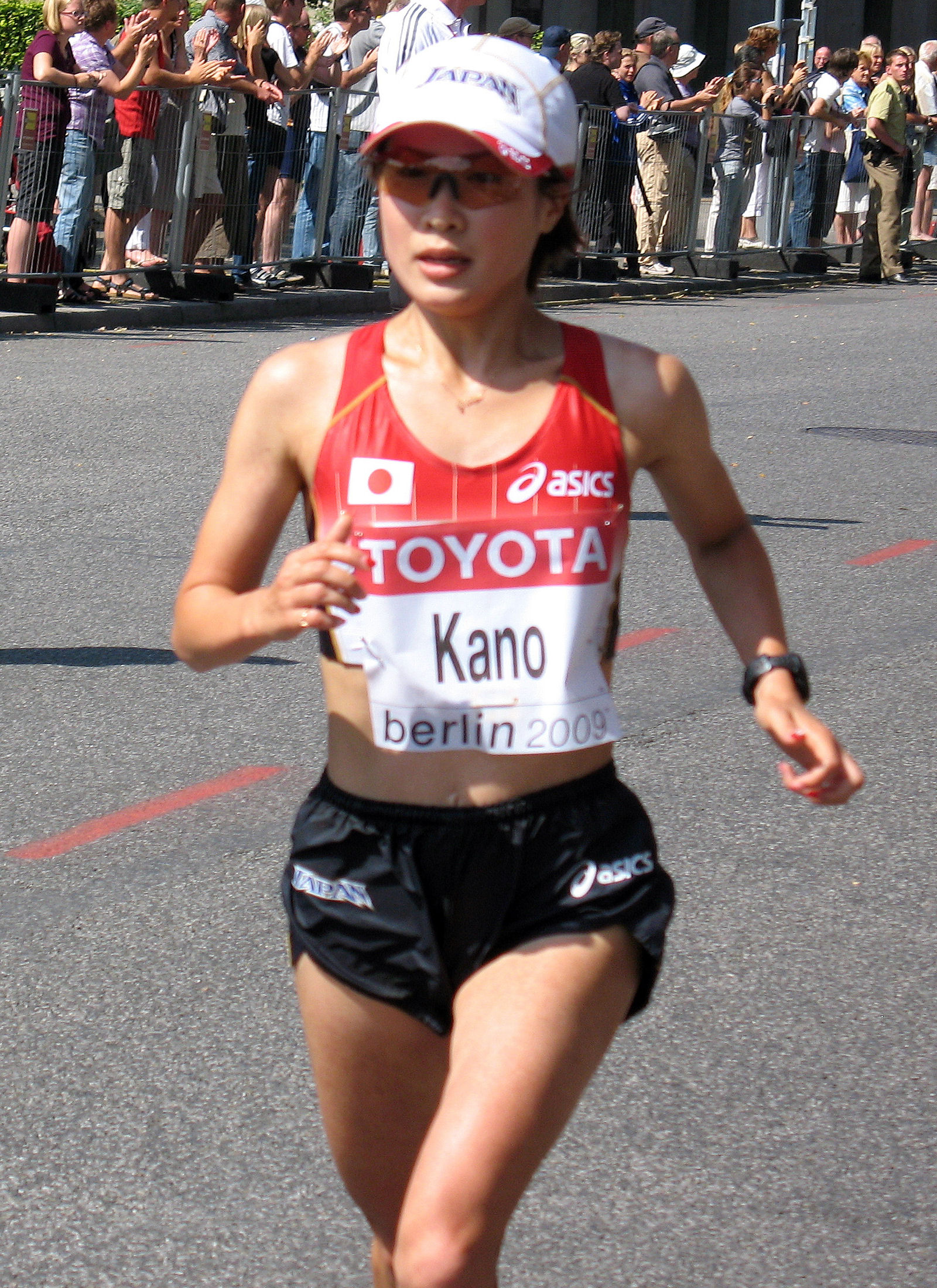
- Kanō running in the 2009 World Championship Marathon race

Personal information
- Born: 27 October 1978 (age 48) Takasago

Sport
- Sport: Track and field
Medal record
Representing Japan
Summer Universiade
Silver medal – second place	1999 Palma de Mallorca	10,000 m
East Asian Games
Silver medal – second place	2009 Hong Kong	Half marathon

Yuri Kanō (加納 由理, Kanō Yuri; born 27 October 1978) is a Japanese athlete who specialises in long distance running, including the marathon.

Her first major medal came at the Summer Universiade, where she won the silver in the 10,000 metres race. She changed to focus on road running and after successful appearances in ekiden competitions, she won her first marathon in 2007 – the Hokkaido Marathon.

Representing an independent athletics club she took part in the New York City Marathon and the London Marathon in 2009. She competed at the World Championships in Athletics for the first time that year, and ended the World Championship marathon race in seventh place. She won a silver in the half marathon event at the 2009 East Asian Games and won her first major domestic marathon race soon after, taking the Nagoya Marathon in a time of 2:27:11.

== Career ==
=== Early career ===
She started out as a 10,000 metres runner on the track and won the silver medal behind Leigh Daniel at the 1999 Summer Universiade. She continued to race over 5000 metres and 10,000 m at Japanese track meetings but she began to make an impact in road running instead, competing in the half marathon.

At the Women's Corporate Team Ekiden Championships in 2004, she ran for Shiseido and the team finished third overall. She set the stage two record at the 2005 Yokohama International Ekiden, running the 10 km stretch in 31:25, and took the team gold with Japan. She ran for Japan in the International Chiba Ekiden in 2006, helping her team to third place. She also began competing abroad and took part in the Carlsbad 5000 and finished in sixth place. She closed the year with a fourth-place finish at the Sanyo Half Marathon.

=== Marathon running ===
After 2007, Kanō became unusual as a road racing athlete in that she competed for an independent athletics club (Second Wind) instead of being part of the corporate team system prevalent in Japan. This enabled her to focus on performing at major races internationally rather than being placed in races where she would be confident of winning.

She began competing over the marathon distance and made her debut at the 2007 Osaka International Ladies Marathon, where she finished third overall with a time of 2:24:43. She won her first marathon race later that year at the Hokkaido Marathon, leading from the very start in her first victory. The following year she won at the Rock ‘n’ Roll San Jose Half Marathon, over half a minute ahead of the rest of the field. She recorded a significant half marathon best of 1:08:57 to win at the 2008 Sapporo Half Marathon.

In 2009, she was second at the Kagawa Marugame Half Marathon and fifth at the Sapporo Half Marathon. She appeared at two World Marathon Majors that year: the New York City Marathon and the London Marathon. She took a tumble onto the pavement in the former race but managed to recover and finished in ninth place. She finished in eleventh place in London. Kanō was selected to represent Japan at the 2009 World Championships in Athletics. She finished seventh overall and was Japan's second best performer in the World Championships marathon race after silver medallist Yoshimi Ozaki. She brought an end to her 2009 campaign with a silver medal in the half marathon at the 2009 East Asian Games, finishing just behind Kim Kum-Ok of North Korea.

She won her first major marathon in 2010: seeing off competition including Derartu Tulu, she won the Nagoya Women's Marathon in 2:27:11, which also doubled as a national championship victory. She was happy with her second ever marathon win, saying: "I have promised myself to challenge for a victory many times before but I was unable to attain my goal previously...this time I was determined to win". A victory at the Sapporo Half Marathon in July came after as she held off a challenge from Azausa Nojiri to keep the lead in the final stages.

== Achievements ==
- All results regarding marathon, unless stated otherwise

Year	Competition	Venue	Position	Notes
Representing Japan
2007	Hokkaido Marathon	Sapporo, Japan	1st	2:30:43
2009	World Championships	Berlin, Germany	7th	2:26:57
2010	Nagoya Marathon	Nagoya, Japan	1st	2:27:11

== Personal bests ==
Event	Time (h:m:s)	Race	Venue	Date
Half marathon	1:08:57	Sapporo Half Marathon	Sapporo, Japan	15 June 2008
Marathon	2:24:27	Tokyo International Women's Marathon	Tokyo, Japan	16 November 2008
