= Yumiko Hara =

Japanese long-distance runner

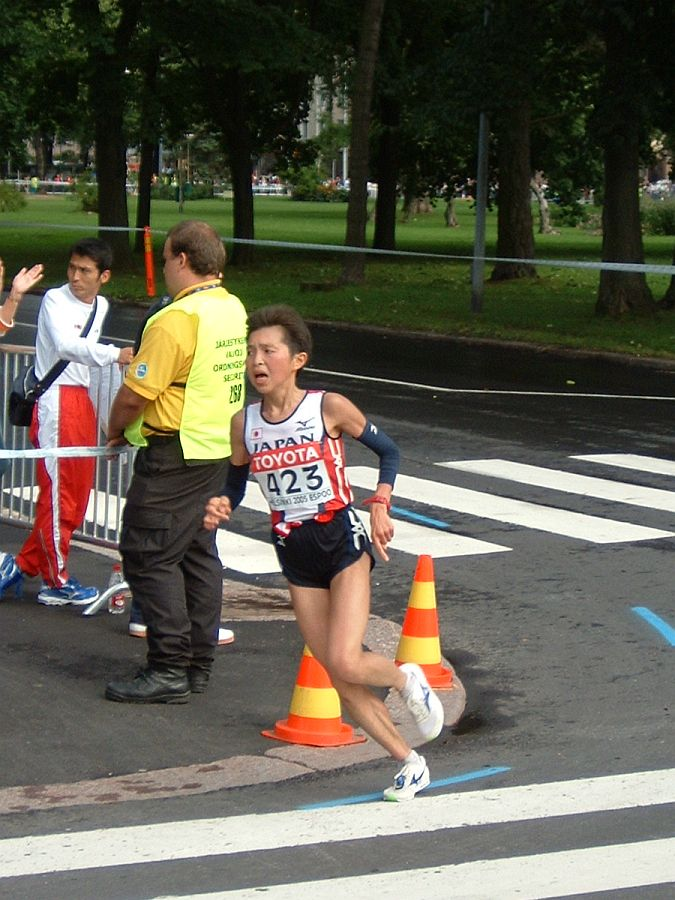
Yumiko Hara

Yumiko Hara (Japanese: 原裕 美子, Hara Yumiko; born 9 January 1982) is a Japanese marathon runner. She has represented Japan at two World Championships in Athletics and had won marathons in Nagoya, Osaka and Hokkaido.

== Early life ==
Hara was born on 9 January 1982, in Ashikaga, Tochigi.

== Career ==
She started out as a 10,000 metres track runner but she changed to road running at a relatively young age. She set a half marathon best at the 2002 Miyazaki Women's Road Race, where her time of 1:09:28 brought her third place behind Mizuki Noguchi and Mikie Takanaka. Running at the Sapporo Half Marathon in 2003 she finished with a time not far from her personal best (1:09:37) to take second place behind Catherine Ndereba, who set a course record. Over this period she competed at the IAAF World Half Marathon Championships and although she failed to finish at the 2002 edition, she managed 19th place the following year.

Hara made her debut over the classic distance at the 2005 Nagoya Marathon, which she won in a time of 2:24:19, and she went on to finish sixth at the 2005 World Championships.

She achieved a personal best time of 2:23:48 hours when she won the 2007 Osaka Ladies Marathon. Having won in a sub-2:26 time, she received automatic selection for the World Championship marathon, also in Osaka, later that year. She was eighteenth at the 2007 World Championships. She returned to the Nagoya course in 2008 but could not repeat her previous success as she fell behind the leading pack at 31 km and finished in fourth place.

Hara took third at the 2009 Osaka Ladies Marathon, but did not compete for over a year after the run. Having left her coaching team (Kyocera track), she began training alone. She approached Japanese coach Yoshio Koide (who trained 2000 Olympic champion Naoko Takahashi among others) and Hara joined his stable in 2010. She quickly responded and won the Hokkaido Marathon in August, running 2:34:12 in hot and humid weather.

She currently is retired from running.

== Legal issues ==
Hara has been arrested for shoplifting several times. She was arrested for stealing cosmetics and other items on July 30, 2017. She was subsequently convicted and sentenced to a one-year prison term, which was suspended by the judge in the case.

== Achievements ==
Year	Competition	Venue	Position	Notes
Representing Japan
2005	World Championships	Helsinki, Finland	6th	2:24:20
2005	Nagoya Marathon	Nagoya, Japan	1st	2:24:19
2007	Osaka Ladies Marathon	Osaka, Japan	1st	2:23:48
2007	World Championships	Osaka, Japan	18th	2:24:20
2010	Hokkaido Marathon	Sapporo, Japan	1st	2:34:12
