= Everline Kimwei =

Kenyan long-distance runner

Medal record

Women's athletics

Representing Kenya

IAAF World Road Running Championships
Gold medal – first place	2007 Udine	Team

Everline Kemunto Kimwei (born 25 August 1987) is a Kenyan long-distance runner. Her greatest achievement was a team gold medal at the 2007 IAAF World Road Running Championships, where she was sixth. She is joint-holder of the African record for the ekiden marathon relay, courtesy of her winning run for Kenya at the 2006 Chiba Ekiden.

Kimwei won a team silver medal as a junior at the 2004 IAAF World Cross Country Championships. She holds the world junior bests for the 15K and 20K distances, with times of 47:39 minutes and 65:04 minutes, respectively. Both these marks were achieved at the 2006 Kobe Women's Half Marathon, which she won. Kimwei was based in Japan for much of her teenage life and was highly successful there. She won the Matsue 10K and Sanyo Women's Half Marathon in both 2005 and 2007. She also had top three finishes at the Nobeoka Golden Games, Shizuoka International, Hyogo Relays and Sapporo Half Marathon. She was the 2007 Japanese Corporate champion over 10K.

Her brief marathon running career began at the 2008 Mumbai Marathon, where she recorded a lifetime best of 2:32:51 hours. She followed this with a run at the 2008 London Marathon, where she failed to finish. She won the Colombo Marathon later that year and made her final appearance at the Istanbul Marathon, finishing well out of contention in 3:20:05 hours.

== International competitions ==
Year	Competition	Venue	Position	Event	Notes
2004	World Cross Country Championships	Brussels, Belgium	16th	Junior race	21:41
2004	World Cross Country Championships	Brussels, Belgium	2nd	Team	36 pts
2007	World Road Running Championships	Udine, Italy	6th	Half marathon	1:08:39
2007	World Road Running Championships	Udine, Italy	1st	Team	3:23:33

== Personal bests ==
- 3000 metres – 9:06.84 min (2007)
- 5000 metres – 15:14.15 min (2005)
- 10,000 metres – 31:16.50 min (2006)
- 10K run – 31:18 min (2007)
- Half marathon – 68:39 min (2007)
- Marathon – 2:32:51 (2008)
