= Cyrus Njui =

Kenyan long-distance runner

Cyrus Gichobi Njui (born 11 February 1986) is a Kenyan long-distance runner who specialises in road running competitions.

Njui initially competed in the steeplechase and the 10,000 metres. He moved to Japan at a young age and studied at Ryutsu Keizai University. In 2006 he won the Sapporo Half Marathon (running for Nissan Motors) and was part of the winning Kenyan team at the International Chiba Ekiden.

In 2010 he won both the Sapporo Half Marathon and the Hokkaido Marathon, recording a time of 2:11:22 hours at the latter event (the second fastest in the history of the race). He improved his marathon best to 2:09:10 hours to take fifth place at the 2011 Tokyo Marathon and defended his Sapporo title in June.

Njui received an 8-month doping ban as a result of a failed drug test at the 2015 Hokkaido Marathon.
