= Hiromi Taniguchi =

Japanese long-distance runner

Medal record
Men's athletics
Representing Japan
World Championships
Gold medal – first place	1991 Tokyo	Marathon

Hiromi Taniguchi (谷口 浩美, Taniguchi Hiromi; born April 5, 1960) is a former Japanese long-distance runner, best known from winning the gold medal in the marathon at the 1991 World Championships in Athletics in Tokyo. The favourite to win the race, Olympic champion Gelindo Bordin, only finished eighth. The marathon was run under extremely adverse conditions of heat and humidity, which are reflected in the slow winning time of 2:14:57h. Taniguchi is the only male Japanese runner ever to have won a gold medal at World Championships.

Taniguchi also won the Beppu-Ōita Marathon in 1985 and the Tokyo and London Marathons in 1987.

== Achievements ==
- All results regarding marathon, unless stated otherwise

Year	Competition	Venue	Position	Notes
Representing Japan
1985	Beppu-Ōita Marathon	Beppu-Ōita, Japan	1st	2:13:16
1985	Fukuoka Marathon	Fukuoka, Japan	2nd	2:10:01
1986	Tokyo International Marathon	Tokyo, Japan	7th	2:11:42
1986	Asian Games	Seoul, South Korea	2nd	2:10:08
1987	London Marathon	London, United Kingdom	1st	2:09:50
1987	Tokyo International Marathon	Tokyo, Japan	1st	2:10:06
1987	Fukuoka Marathon	Fukuoka, Japan	6th	2:12:14
1988	Tokyo International Marathon	Tokyo, Japan	9th	2:13:16
1988	Beijing Marathon	Beijing, PR China	2nd	2:07:40
1989	Tokyo International Marathon	Tokyo, Japan	1st	2:09:34
1989	Hokkaido Marathon	Sapporo, Japan	1st	2:13:16
1990	Rotterdam Marathon	Rotterdam, Netherlands	1st	2:10:56
1991	Tokyo International Marathon	Tokyo, Japan	9th	2:11:55
1991	World Championships	Tokyo, Japan	1st	2:14:57
1992	Olympic Games	Barcelona, Spain	8th	2:14:42
1993	Boston Marathon	Boston, United States	4th	2:11:02
1994	Rotterdam Marathon	Rotterdam, Netherlands	4th	2:10:46
1995	Lake Biwa Marathon	Ōtsu, Japan	4th	2:11:51
1995	Fukuoka Marathon	Fukuoka, Japan	7th	2:10:42
1996	Olympic Games	Atlanta, United States	19th	2:17.26
1997	Tokyo International Marathon	Tokyo, Japan	4th	2:11:26
