= Olga Appell =

American long-distance runner

Medal record
Women's Athletics
Representing Mexico
Pan American Games
Gold medal – first place	1991 Havana	Marathon

Olga Appell Avalos (born August 2, 1963, in Durango) is an American long-distance runner from Mexico, best known for winning the gold medal in the women's marathon at the 1991 Pan American Games in Havana, Cuba. She ran at the 1992 Summer Olympics the following year, but failed to finish the race. She competed for Mexico until February 25, 1994, at which point she switched allegiance to the United States. She represented her adopted country at the 1996 Summer Olympics. There she was eliminated in the qualifying heats of the women's 10,000 metres event.

She won the USA Cross Country Championships in 1994. Among her wins on the road running circuit were the 1993 Sapporo Half Marathon, 1994 Lilac Bloomsday Run and 1995 Vancouver Sun Run. She won the Hokkaido Marathon on two occasions, 1992 and 1995 (the second time as a naturalized U.S. citizen) and was the 1996 winner of the Twin Cities Marathon. Olga Appell is the 12th best marathoner in USA History.
