= 2005 Nagoya Women's Marathon =

Marathon race in 2005

The 2005 Nagoya marathon was held on March 13, 2005. It was the 26th edition of the Nagoya Women's Marathon. The Japanese Yumiko Hara finished first with a time of 2:24.19. Only females were allowed to take part in the competition.

rank	name	country	time
Gold	Yumiko Hara	Japan	2:24.19
Silver	Megumi Oshima	Japan	2:24.25
Bronze	Ryoko Kitajima	Japan	2:24.54
4	Yasuko Hashimoto	Japan	2:25.21
5	Kiyomi Ogawa	Japan	2:26.02
6	Chieko Yamazaki	Japan	2:27.22
7	Yoko Shibui	Japan	2:27.40
8	Takami Ominami	Japan	2:31.16
9	Kaoru Nishi	Japan	2:32.39
10	Monika Stefanowicz	Poland	2:33.14
11	Miwako Ueki	Japan	2:33.31
12	Ayumi Hayashi	Japan	2:33.37
13	Yumiko Okamoto	Japan	2:33.47
14	Jackie Fairweather	Australia	2:34.10
15	Aki Negoro	Japan	2:34.43
16	Tomoko Kai	Japan	2:35.06
17	Emi Takagi	Japan	2:35.28
18	Roseline Nyangacha	Kenya	2:36.09
19	Maya Nishio	Japan	2:36.51
20	Irina Bogacheva	Kyrgyzstan	2:37.04
21	Yoriko Oda	Japan	2:37.27
22	Ayumi Noshita	Japan	2:38.50
23	Takako Kotorida	Japan	2:39.00
24	Megumi Kobayashi	Japan	2:43.17
25	Mai Tagami	Japan	2:43.56
