= Masako Chiba =

Japanese long-distance runner

Masako Chiba (千葉 真子, Chiba Masako; born 18 July 1976 in Uji, Kyoto) is a Japanese long-distance runner, who won the bronze medal in 10,000 metres at the 1997 World Championships in Athens and in the marathon race at the 2003 World Championships in Paris.

Chiba was a torchbearer during the 1998 Nagano Olympics Opening Ceremony.

== Achievements ==
Year	Competition	Venue	Position	Event	Notes
Representing Japan
1997	East Asian Games	Busan, South Korea	1st	10,000 m	31:31.85
1997	World Championships	Athens, Greece	3rd	10,000 m	31:41.93
2001	Hokkaido Marathon	Sapporo, Japan	1st	Marathon	2:30:39
2003	World Championships	Paris, France	3rd	Marathon	2:25:09
2004	Hokkaido Marathon	Sapporo, Japan	1st	Marathon	2:26:50
2005	Hokkaido Marathon	Sapporo, Japan	1st	Marathon	2:25:46

== Personal bests ==
- 5000 metres - 15:20.58 min (1997)
- 10,000 metres - 31:20.46 min (1996)
- Half marathon - 1:09:27 hrs (1999)
- Marathon - 2:21:45 hrs (2003)
