= Colombo Marathon =

Annual marathon in Colombo, Sri Lanka

- Logo of Colombo Marathon
- Date: 1st Sunday of October
- Location: Colombo, Sri Lanka
- Distance: 5 km, 10 km, half and full Marathon
- Primary sponsor: LSR Travel (LSR)
- Established: 1998
- Course records: Men: (Kenya) Anthony Mugo 2:18:33; Women: (Kenya) Winfrida Kwamboka 2:46:53
- Website: Official website

The Colombo Marathon, officially known as the LSR Colombo Marathon and formerly known as the LSR International Marathon, is a marathon held annually since 1998 in Colombo, capital city of Sri Lanka. It is a permanent member of Association of International Marathons and Distance Races (AIMS). It also has voting rights in AIMS, which makes it one of 56 races out of 110 worldwide with that right.

== History ==
In the late 1990s, Sri Lankan tour operator LSR decided to start an international marathon in Sri Lanka because there was no such event in Sri Lanka at that time. The first marathon, the "LSR International Marathon", was held in the city of Galle in 1998. The host city of the marathon subsequently changed to Negombo, Kandy, and then Dambulla, before Sri Lanka's capital Colombo hosted the event for the first time in 2004. In 2006 the name of marathon was changed to the "LSR Colombo Marathon".

== Organization ==
Travel agent and tour operator company Lanka Sportreizen (LSR) is the organizer and primary sponsor of the marathon. The event is also supported by the Ministry of Tourism, the Ministry of Youth Affairs, the Ministry of Education, and the Ministry of Sport, along with SriLankan Airlines and the Sri Lanka Police Service. Technical assistance is provided by the Athletic Association of Sri Lanka. Some of the key objectives of the marathon are to promote recreational activities in Sri Lanka and to promote Sri Lanka as safe and ideal place for tourism and sports.

== Participants and prize ==
The 2015 edition of the marathon hosted around 7,000 runners from more than 30 countries, who participated in various categories. The prize money for the event was increased from 2014 to encourage an increase in participation, with the prize money for winner of full marathon increasing from $1,500 (US) to $2,500 (US). The event includes a special full and half marathons for men and women over 50 years in addition to a "fun run" of 5 and 10 km for youth aged more than 15 years.

== Course ==
The full marathon starts at the headquarters of the Ministry of Sports and proceeds through the suburbs of Borella, Dematagoda, Peliyagoda, Wattala, along the Hamilton Canal, Pamunugama, Thalahena, Pitipana and Duwa, finishing at the Negombo Beach Park.

== Results ==
Edition	Year	Men's Winner	Time (h:m:s)	Women's Winner	Time (h:m:s)
1st	1998	Sarath Gamage (SRI)	2:22:22	Malika Chandrakanthi (SRI)	3:01:31
2nd	1999	Sarath Amila (SRI)	2:32:22	Sujeewa Jayasena (SRI)	3:13:13
—	1999	Was not held			
3rd	2001	Anuradha Cooray (SRI)	2:19:51		
4th	2002	Ajith Bandara (SRI)	2:22:26	Malika Chandrakanthi (SRI)	3:09:17
5th	2003	Sujeewa Chandrapala (SRI)	2:25:19	Kanchanamala Udagedara (SRI)	3:05:22
6th	2004	Sujeewa Chandrapala (SRI)	2:28:23	Kanchanamala Udagedara (SRI)	3:12:57
—	2005	Was not held			
7th	2006	Nimal Shantha (SRI)	2:30:26	Lakmini Bogahawatte (SRI)	2:59:27
8th	2007	Ajith Bandara (SRI)	2:26:37	Lakmini Bogahawatte (SRI)	3:25:43
9th	2008	Ajith Bandara (SRI)	2:25:25	Everline Kimwei (KEN)	3:00:39
—	2009	Was not held			
10th	2010	Kennedy Kimutai (KEN)	2:22:14	Manjula Kumarasinghe (SRI)	3:10:01
11th	2011	Geoffrey Birgen (KEN)	2:28:08	Ruvina Mallawarachchige (SRI)	2:57:28
12th	2012	Geoffrey Birgen (KEN)	2:26:40	Ruvina Mallawarachchige (SRI)	2:55:47
13th	2013	Anthony Mugo (KEN)	2:21:01	Fridah Too (KEN)	2:48:11
14th	2014	Anthony Mugo (KEN)	2:18:33	Winfrida Kwamboka (KEN)	2:46:53
15th	2015	Anthony Mugo (KEN)	2:23:17	Lakmini Bogahawatte (SRI)	3:02:38
16th	2016	Joseph Gitau (KEN)	2:25:32	Margaret Wangui (KEN)	2:53:47
17th	2017	James Tallam (KEN)	2:23:37	Mercy Too (KEN)	2:59:46
18th	2018	James Tallam (KEN)	2:21:52	Margaret Wangui (KEN)	2:52:54
–	2019	Was not held			
