= Mizuki Matsuda =

Japanese long-distance runner

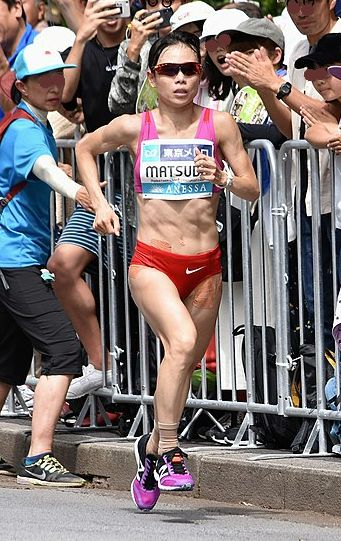
- Mizuki Matsuda in 2019

Personal information
- Nationality: Japanese
- Born: 31 May 1995 (age 31) Oriono, Osaka, Japan
- Height: 1.58 m (5 ft 2 in)
- Weight: 46 kg (101 lb)

Sport
- Sport: Long-distance running
- Events: 10,000 metres, Marathon
- Club: Daihatsu (ダイハツ工業)

Achievements and titles
- Personal bests: 1500 m: 4:21.15; 3000 m: 9:08.15; 5000 m: 15:46.40 (2016); 10,000 m: 31:39.41 (2017); Half marathon: 1:10:25 (2016); Marathon: 2:20:47 (2022 Osaka International Ladies Marathon)

Mizuki Matsuda (松田瑞生, Matsuda Mizuki, born 31 May 1995) is a Japanese long distance runner. She competed in the women's 10,000 metres at the 2017 World Championships in Athletics.

In July 2017, Matsuda placed 3rd in the 10,000 meter run at the 2017 Asian Athletics Championships. She has been national champion at the 10,000 meter distance in 2017 and 2018, with a personal best of 31:39.

In January 2018, Matsuda won the Osaka International Women's Marathon with a time of 2:22:44, in her marathon debut. She won 2020 Osaka International Ladies Marathon with personal best 2:21:47. In March 2021 she won Nagoya Women's Marathon in 2:21:51. On 30 January 2022 she won Osaka International Women's Marathon and made her new personal best (lifting 55 seconds from 2020 Osaka Marathon) and also set new course record.
