= Yumi Kokamo =

Japanese long-distance runner

Yumi Kokamo (小鴨 由水, Kokamo Yumi) (born December 26, 1971, in Akashi, Hyogo) is a retired female long-distance runner from Japan. She won the 1992 edition of the Osaka Ladies Marathon. She clocked a winning time of 2:26:26 on January 26, 1992. Later that year Kokamo competed at the 1992 Summer Olympics, finishing in 29th place in the women's marathon race.

== Achievements ==
- All results regarding marathon, unless stated otherwise

Year	Competition	Venue	Position	Notes
Representing Japan
1982	Osaka Ladies Marathon	Osaka, Japan	1st	2:26:26
1982	Olympic Games	Barcelona, Spain	29th	2:58:18
