= Sanyo Women's Half Marathon =

Road running event in Japan

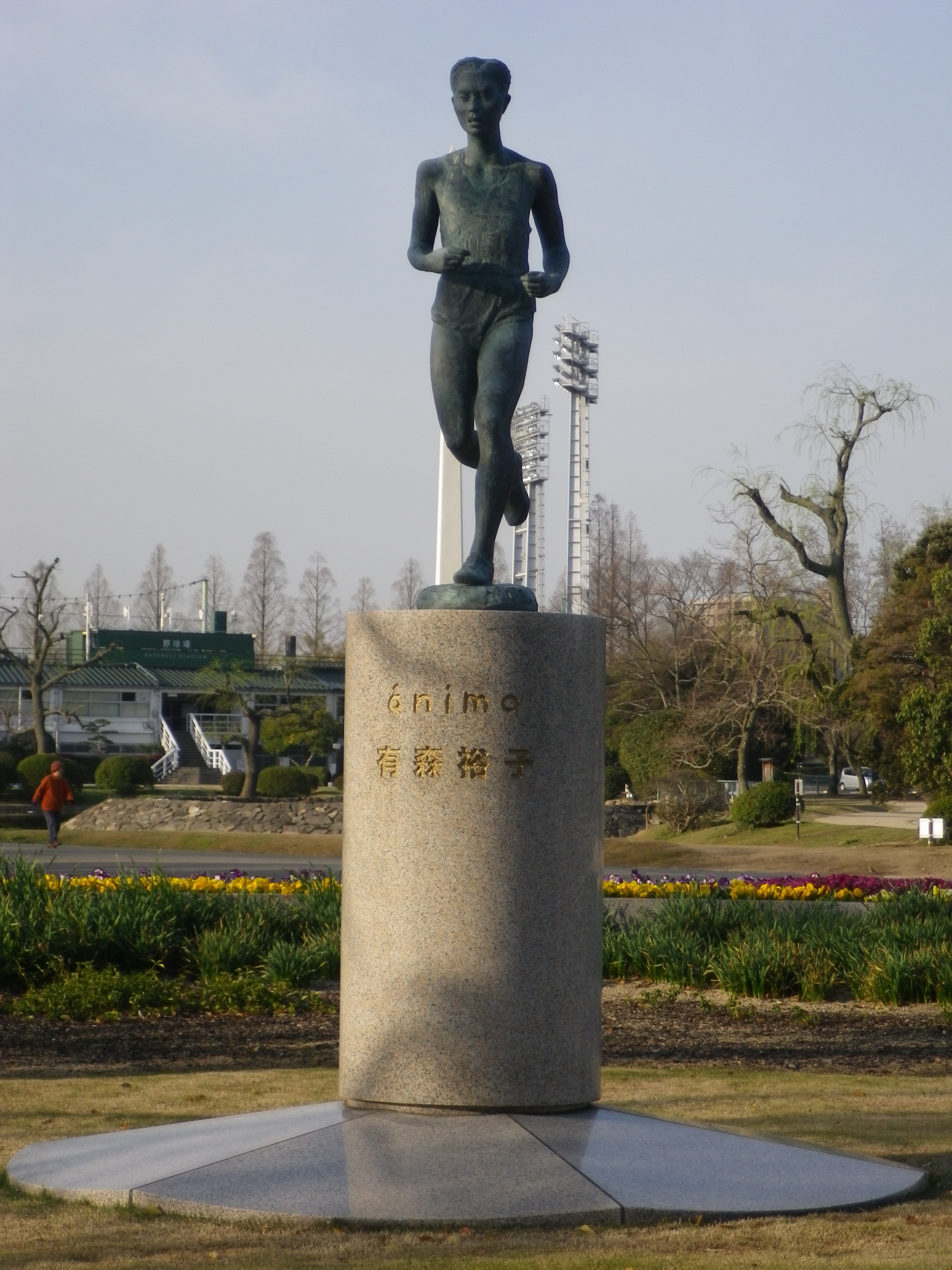
A statue in Okayama of Yuko Arimori, after whom the half marathon prize is named

The Sanyo Women's Half Marathon, also known as the Sanyo Women's Road Race (Japanese: 山陽女子ロードレース), is an annual road running competition for women held in December in Okayama, Japan. It features both a 10K run and half marathon race (21.1 km/13.1 miles). Sanyo Shimbun, a daily newspaper, is the title sponsor for the event.

The day's events previously included an inter-prefectural competition (1985 to 1999) and a junior 3 km race in the 1990s. The half marathon race attracts top level Japanese and Japan-based foreign runners, as well as a smaller number of other international runners. The race is occasionally used as the Japanese women's selection race for the IAAF World Half Marathon Championships. Japanese entrants in both events are mostly collegiate athletes or members of corporate running teams.

The course starts and finishes at Kanko Stadium in the centre of Okayama city. The half marathon is known as the Yuko Arimori Cup, in honour of the two-time Olympic medallist in the marathon, who was born in the city. The 10K is referred to as the Kinue Hitomi Cup in respect of the Okayama-born athlete who won Japan's first ever women's Olympic medal. Typically, the half marathon features about 100 entries and the 10K attracts around 200 runners. The 2011 edition had a record high of 366 entrants into the top level races.

The course record for the half marathon is held by Sally Kaptich Chepyego with her time of 1:08:17 hours set in 2015 – the second time she had broken the record. The 10K record of 31:54 minutes was set in 2007 by Tiki Gelana. Historically, the winners of both races have been Japanese. There were several Chinese winners in the 1990s and since 2000 Kenyan women based in Japan have increasingly reached the top of the podium. Yukiko Akaba is the only runner to win consecutive half marathon titles. Kenyans Chepyego and Evelyn Kimwei and Japan's Mizuki Noguchi (the 2004 Olympic marathon champion) are the only other women to win the race twice.

== Past winners ==
Key: Course record 20 km distance

=== Half marathon ===
Edition	Year	Winner	Time (h:m:s)
1st	1982	Rumiko Kaneko (JPN)	1:12:39
2nd	1983	Mafune Hori (JPN)	1:17:23
3rd	1984	Izumi Kitamura (JPN)	1:12:16
4th	1985	Mayumi Matsumoto (JPN)	1:14:47
5th	1986	Yuki Tamura (JPN)	1:14:00
6th	1987	Lee Mi-Ok (KOR)	1:08:59
7th	1988	Katsuyo Hyodo (JPN)	1:07:57
8th	1989	Yuko Arimori (JPN)	1:09:02
9th	1990	Chen Qingmei (CHN)	1:08:59
10th	1991	Wang Xiuting (CHN)	1:10:14
11th	1992	Wang Yenmei (CHN)	1:10:37
12th	1993	Yoshiko Yamamoto (JPN)	1:12:39
13th	1994	Megumi Setoguchi (JPN)	1:12:05
14th	1995	Sachiyo Seiyama (JPN)	1:12:04
15th	1996	Liang Ying (CHN)	1:12:00
16th	1997	Kanako Haginaga (JPN)	1:11:14
17th	1998	Rie Matsuoka (JPN)	1:10:08
18th	1999	Tomoko Motohira (JPN)	1:12:14
19th	2000	Mizuki Noguchi (JPN)	1:09:44
20th	2001	Nami Kurosawa (JPN)	1:11:04
21st	2002	Derartu Tulu (ETH)	1:11:09
22nd	2003	Mizuki Noguchi (JPN)	1:10:04
23rd	2004	Ruth Wanjiru (KEN)	1:10:23
24th	2005	Evelyn Kimwei (KEN)	1:10:47
25th	2006	Benita Johnson (AUS)	1:10:01
26th	2007	Evelyn Kimwei (KEN)	1:09:20
27th	2008	Pauline Wanguru (KEN)	1:10:54
28th	2009	Yumi Hirata (JPN)	1:11:13
29th	2010	Shoko Mori (JPN)	1:11:41
30th	2011	Yukiko Akaba (JPN)	1:09:16
31st	2012	Yukiko Akaba (JPN)	1:09:56
32nd	2013	Sally Chepyego Kaptich (KEN)	1:08:24
33rd	2014	Asami Furuse (JPN)	1:12:01
34th	2015	Sally Chepyego Kaptich (KEN)	1:08:17
35th	2016	Rei Ohara (JPN)	1:10:04
36th	2017	Pauline Kaveke Kamulu (KEN)	1:08:04
37th	2018	Honami Maeda (JPN)	1:09:12
38th	2019	Charlotte Purdue (UK)	1:08:45

=== 10K run ===
Edition	Year	Winner	Time (h:m:s)
1st	1982	Chiemi Kashiwagi (JPN)	35:26
2nd	1983	Chiemi Kashiwagi (JPN)	35:34
3rd	1984	Mikiko Oguni (JPN)	36:13
4th	1985	Yuki Tamura (JPN)	35:29
5th	1986	Ikuko Takahashi (JPN)	34:22
6th	1987	Mi-Ja Chung (KOR)	34:15
7th	1988	Tsugumi Fukuyama (JPN)	34:01
8th	1989	Yoshie Terazawa (JPN)	33:10
9th	1990	Yoshie Terazawa (JPN)	33:44
10th	1991	Wang Yongmei (CHN)	33:04
11th	1992	Makiko Okamoto (JPN)	33:02
12th	1993	Makiko Okamoto (JPN)	33:10
13th	1994	Sachiyo Seiyama (JPN)	33:03
14th	1995	Kazuko Kusakabe (JPN)	33:19
15th	1996	Yoshiko Ichikawa (JPN)	33:13
16th	1997	Kaoru Shibata (JPN)	33:13
17th	1998	Yuri Kano (JPN)	32:47
18th	1999	Keiko Fushimiya (JPN)	32:51
19th	2000	Miki Oyama (JPN)	33:29
20th	2001	Miwako Yamanaka (JPN)	32:10
21st	2002	Emi Ikeda (JPN)	32:38
22nd	2003	Chieko Yamazaki (JPN)	32:46
23rd	2004	Winfrida Kebaso (KEN)	32:20
24th	2005	Benita Johnson (AUS)	32:26
25th	2006	Ai Seike (JPN)	32:33
26th	2007	Tiki Gelana (ETH)	31:54
27th	2008	Winfrida Kebaso (KEN)	32:19
28th	2009	Nanae Kuwashiro (JPN)	32:27
29th	2010	Sally Chepyego Kaptich (KEN)	32:13
30th	2011	Ann Karindi Mwangi (KEN)	32:47
31st	2012	Felista Wambui Wanjuku (KEN)	32:16
32nd	2013	Grace Mbuthi Kimanzi (KEN)	32:24
33rd	2014	Grace Mbuthi Kimanzi (KEN)	32:05
34th	2015	Rosemary Monica Wanjiru (KEN)	32:03
