= Takura Izumi =

Japanese archaeologist and writer (born 1948)

Takura Izumi (泉 拓良, Izumi Takura; born 1948) is a Japanese archaeologist and writer. He is a Professor of Archaeology at Kyoto University and Professor Emeritus of Nara University. He specializes in the archeology of prehistoric times, and has authored books on the appearance of Jōmon pottery and the early history of Japan. He is a member of the Japanese Archaeological Association, Japan Society of Scientific Studies on Cultural Properties, West Asian Archaeology Society, Japanese Society for West Asian Archeology, Japan Orient Society, and The Society For Near Eastern Studies on Japan.
