= Erick Wainaina =

Kenyan marathon runner

Erick Wainaina (born December 19, 1973, in Nyahururu) is a Kenyan marathon runner, who won an Olympic bronze medal in 1996 and a silver medal in 2000. He finished seventh in the 2004 Summer Olympics marathon in Athens, making him one of the few athletes in Olympic history to finish in the top 10 at three marathons.

Wainaina ran in the marathon at the 1995 World Championships and finished in 18th place. He missed the 1999 World Championships due to injury. Wainaina frequently competed in Japanese races: he is a two-time winner of the Tokyo International Marathon, having taken the title in both 1995 and 2002. He has won the Hokkaido Marathon on three occasions and he also won the 2003 edition of the Nagano Marathon. He finished 13th at the 2008 Nagano Marathon. Two years later he participated in the Nagano Marathon again, finishing 10th.

== Achievements ==
| Year | Competition | Venue | Position | Event | Notes |
Representing Kenya
| 1994 | Hokkaido Marathon | Sapporo, Japan | 1st | Marathon | 2:15:03 |
| 1995 | Tokyo Marathon | Tokyo, Japan | 1st | Marathon | 2:10:31 |
| 1995 | World Championships | Gothenburg, Sweden | 18th | Marathon | 2:19:53 |
| 1996 | Olympic Games | Atlanta, United States | 3rd | Marathon | 2:12:44 |
| 1997 | Hokkaido Marathon | Sapporo, Japan | 1st | Marathon | 2:13:45 |
| 2000 | Nagano Marathon | Nagano, Japan | 1st | Marathon | 2:10:17 |
| 2000 | Olympic Games | Sydney, Australia | 2nd | Marathon | 2:10:31 |
| 2002 | Tokyo Marathon | Tokyo, Japan | 1st | Marathon | 2:08:43 |
| 2003 | Nagano Marathon | Nagano, Japan | 1st | Marathon | 2:12:00 |
| 2003 | Hokkaido Marathon | Sapporo, Japan | 1st | Marathon | 2:13:13 |
| 2004 | Olympic Games | Athens, Greece | 7th | Marathon | 2:13:30 |
