= Steve Spence =

American long-distance runner and coach

Medal record

Representing United States

Men's athletics

World Championships
Bronze medal – third place	1991 Tokyo	Marathon

Steve Spence (born May 9, 1962, in Elizabethtown, Pennsylvania) is a United States long-distance runner and coach. One of his many accomplishments was winning a bronze medal at the 1991 World Championships in Athletics. He graduated from Lower Dauphin High School in Hummelstown, Pennsylvania, where he ran track. He then attended Shippensburg University, where he won numerous NCAA Division Two national titles in the 5000m run. Spence is now the head cross country coach and assistant track coach at Shippensburg University.

== Achievements ==
Year	Competition	Venue	Position	Event	Notes
Representing the United States
1991	World Championships	Tokyo, Japan	3rd	Marathon	2:15:36
1992	Olympic Games	Barcelona, Spain	12th	Marathon	2:15:21
