= Noriyasu Mizukami =

Japanese athlete

Personal information
- Nationality: Japanese
- Born: 6 October 1947 (age 78)

Sport
- Sport: Long-distance running
- Event: Marathon

Noriyasu Mizukami (水上 則安, Mizukami Noriyasu; born 6 October 1947) is a Japanese long-distance runner. He competed in the marathon at the 1976 Summer Olympics.
