= Workenesh Edesa =

Ethiopian long-distance runner (born 1992)

Personal information
- Born: 11 September 1992 (age 33)

Sport
- Sport: Athletics
- Event: Long distance running

Achievements and titles
- Personal best(s): Marathon: 2:18:51 (Berlin, 2022)

Workenesh Edesa (born 11 September 1992) is an Ethiopian marathon runner.

== Career ==
She had her first top eight finish at a major marathon at the 2021 Boston Marathon. She set a personal best of 2:18:51 at the Berlin Marathon in 2022. She was upgraded to a third place finish at Tokyo Marathon in 2023 after runner-up Tsehay Gemechu was found guilty of blood doping.

She set a new course record to win the Sydney Marathon in 2024, running 2:21:40 to take three minutes from the previous best set in 2019 by Stella Barsosio. It was also the fastest woman's marathon time ever set on Australian soil. She finished seventh at the Boston Marathon in 2024.

In 2024 and 2025 she won the Osaka Marathon in Japan, equalling her personal best of 2:18:51 to set a course record in 2024, and running 2:21:00 to win in January 2025. She finished third in 2:22.05 behind Sifan Hassan and Brigid Kosgei at the Sydney Marathon on 31 August 2025.
