= Futoshi Shinohara =

Japanese marathon runner

Futoshi Shinohara (Japanese: 篠原 太; born 14 April 1962) is a Japanese male former long-distance runner who competed in marathons. He represented his country at the 1991 World Championships in Athletics and finished in fifth place. He set a personal best of 2:11:34 hours at the 1992 Tokyo International Marathon, where he placed sixth.

On the professional circuit, he won the 1986 Perth Marathon and 1990 Hokkaido Marathon. He was also runner-up at the Toronto Marathon, Beppu-Ōita Marathon, and Otawara Marathon.

== International competitions ==
Year	Competition	Venue	Position	Event	Notes
1991	World Championships	Tokyo, Marathon	5th	Marathon	2:15:52
