= Masanobu Izumi =

Japanese footballer and manager

Masanobu Izumi 泉 政伸
Personal information
- Full name: Masanobu Izumi
- Date of birth: April 8, 1944 (age 82)
- Place of birth: Hiroshima, Japan
- Height: 1.66 m (5 ft 5 1/2 in)
- Position: Forward

Youth career
- 1960–1962: Hiroshima Motomachi High School
- 1963–1966: Meiji University

Senior career*
Years	Team	Apps	(Gls)
1967–1976	Toyota Motors		

International career
1965	Japan	1	(0)

Managerial career
- 1987–1988: Toyota Motors
- * Club domestic league appearances and goals

Masanobu Izumi (泉 政伸, Izumi Masanobu; born April 8, 1944) is a former Japanese football player and manager. He played for Japan national team.

== Club career ==
Izumi was born in Hiroshima Prefecture on April 8, 1944. After graduating from Meiji University, he joined Japanese Regional Leagues club Toyota Motors in 1967. The club was promoted to Japan Soccer League Division 1 in 1972 and Division 2 in 1973. He retired in 1976.

== National team career ==
On March 25, 1965, when Izumi was a Meiji University student, he debuted for the Japan national team against Singapore and Japan won the match. However, after graduating from university, he was not selected for Japan because he had joined a club that did not play in the Japan Soccer League.

== Coaching career ==
After retirement, Izumi became a manager for Toyota Motors. He managed one season, but the club finished on last place and was relegated to Division 2.

== National team statistics ==
Japan national team
Year	Apps	Goals
1965	1	0
Total	1	0
