= Sohji Izumi =

Japanese actor (born 1988)

- Izumi Sōji (和泉 崇司)
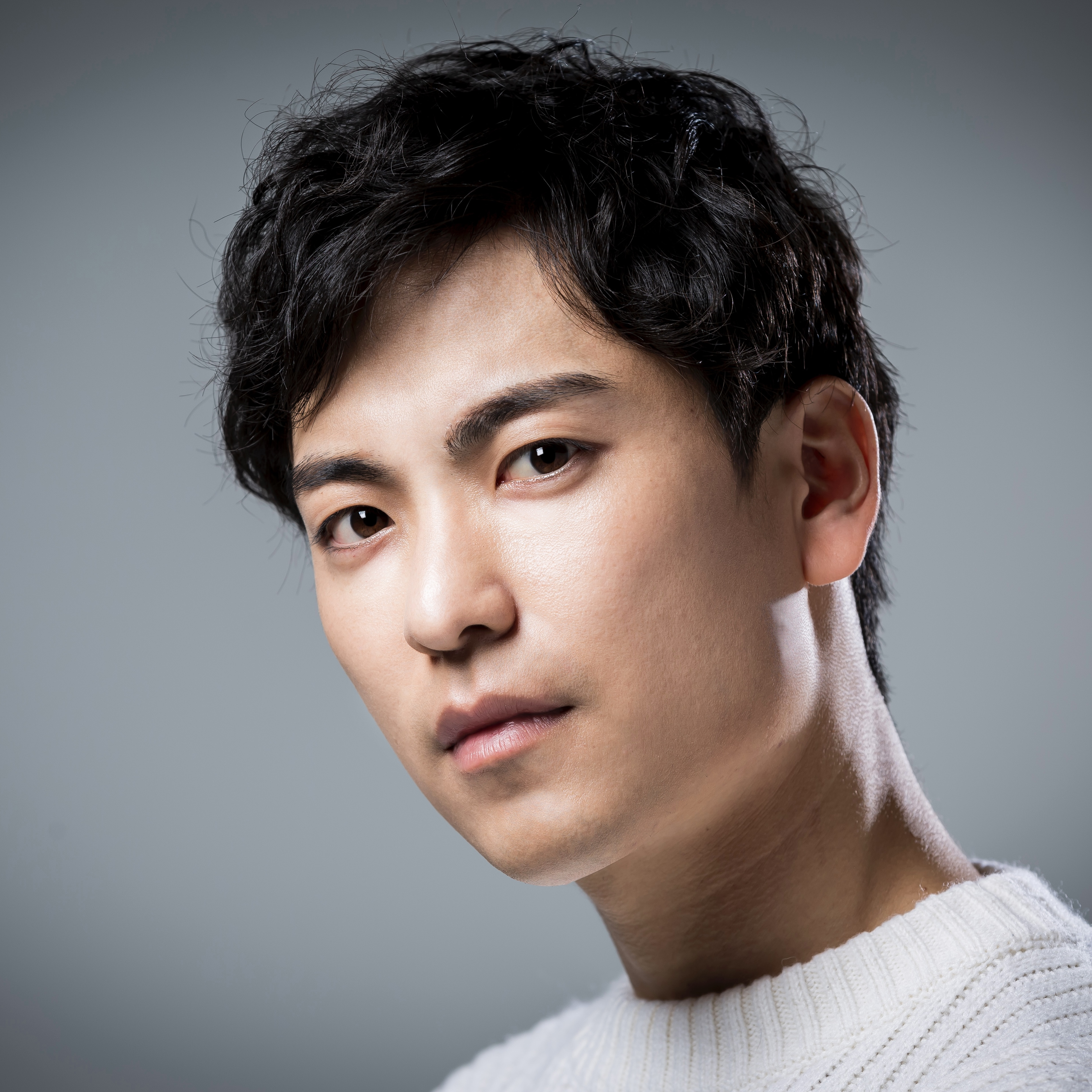
- Born: February 1, 1988 (age 38); Hiroshima, Japan
- Occupation: Actor
- Years active: 2012–present
- Agent: Zero Light-Years
- Known for: Angel Heart
- Height: 181 cm (5 ft 11 in)
- Website: zly.co.jp/izumi.html

Sohji Izumi (和泉 崇司, Izumi Sôji; born February 1, 1988 in Hiroshima) is a Japanese actor.

Izumi was born in Hiroshima, Japan in 1988. He competed in javelin throwing in high school, placing 4th in Hiroshima prefecture and 8th in Chugoku Area. While studying at the University of Central Arkansas, he broke the school record and received an athletic scholarship. He participated in the United States Army ROTC program and received basic military training. He also completed the Emergency Medical Technician training at the local fire station, and Advanced Life-support training at the Tokyo Fire Department.

Izumi began acting in 2012 after completing graduate school.

He is best known for his roles as Carlito in the drama Angel Heart, a sequel to City Hunter by Tsukasa Hojo.

== Filmography ==
=== Television ===
- IRYU SOSA Season2 (TV Asahi, 2012)
- Taira no Kiyomori (NHK, 2012)
- IRYU SOSA Season3 as Satoshi Shiomi (TV Asahi, 2013, Episode 3)
- Nirai Kanai no Kataribe (ABC, 2013)
- Tokusou Saizensen 2013 as Oyama (TV Asahi, 2013)
- Kaiki Daisakusen (NHK-BS, 2013)
- Specialist 2 as Yuki Nagamine (TV Asahi, 2014)
- TEAM as Hayashi (TV Asahi, 2014, Episode 6)
- Hanasaki Mai Speaks Out as Jyunichi Kameda (Nippon TV, 2014, Final Episode)
- Inochi Arukagiri Tatakae soshite Ikinukunda as Toshinao Takagi (Fuji TV, 2014)
- Women won't allow it as Masato Hirata (TBS TV, 2014, Episode 9&10)
- ORANGE as Satoshi Naito (TBS-TV, 2015)
- Saigo no Shonin as Akira Miyake (TV Asahi, 2015)
- Deiri Kinshi no Onna as Tatsuya Ariyoshi (TV Asahi, 2015, Episode 5)
- SCOOP as Syunsuke Sasaki (TBS-TV, 2015)
- Kage no Chitai as Ryoichi Kusakabe (TBS-TV, 2015)
- Hanasaki Mai Speaks Out Season2 as Naoki Kase (Nippon TV, 2015)
- Angel Heart as Carlito (Nippon TV, 2015)
- Kenji no Shimei as Jyunichi Mabuchi (TV Asahi, 2016)
- Specialist as Takumi Ayuhara (TV Asahi, 2016)
- Shizumanu Taiyō as Katsuki Onchi (WOWOW, 2016)
- Guard Center 24 as Minegishi (Nippon TV, 2016)
- OMIYASAN Special2 as Keichiro Nishi (TV Asahi, 2016)
- Kenji no Honkai as Tetsuaki Koyama (TV Asahi, 2016)
- Zenigata Keibu as Wataru Takasugi (WOWOW, 2017)
- Shacho shitsuno Fuyu as Oonishi (WOWOW, 2017)
- IRYU SOSA Season4 as Nobuhiko Takase (TV Asahi, 2017)
- Temisu no Tsurugi as Nonomura (TV Tokyo, 2017)

=== Films ===
- Niryu Shosetsuka -The Serialist (TOEI, 2013)

=== Stage ===
- SANADA JUYUSHI (2013)
- 9days Queen as Robert Kett (2014)
- Shakespeare Monogatari as Adam (2016-2017)
- Chiruran as Keisuke Yamanami (2017)
