= Yukiko Akaba =

Japanese long-distance runner (born 1979)

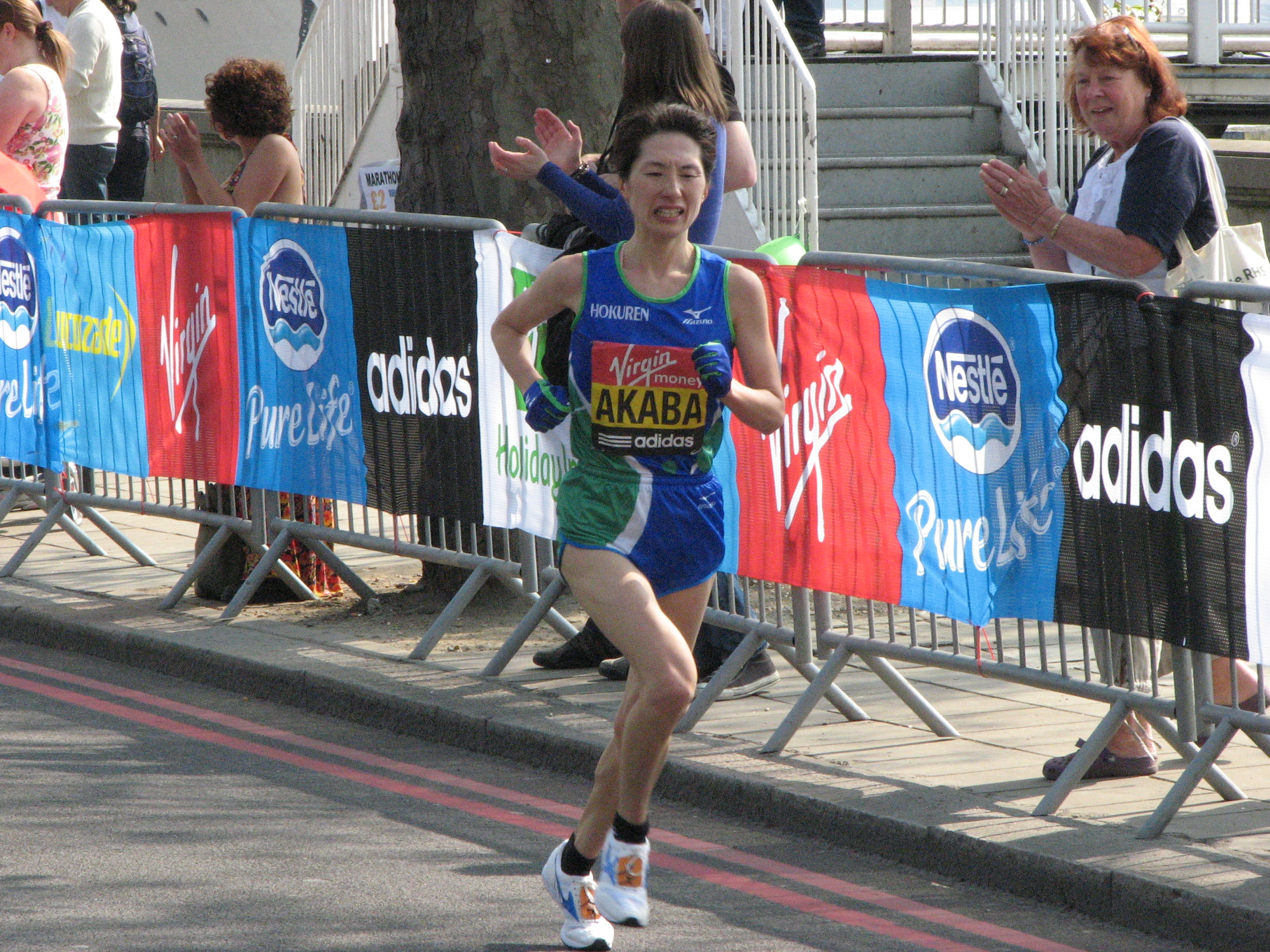
- Akaba at the 2011 London Marathon

Personal information
- Born: October 18, 1979 (age 47) Haga, Tochigi, Japan

Sport
- Sport: Marathon running
Medal record
Representing Japan
Summer Universiade
Silver medal – second place	1999 Palma de Mallorca	Half marathon
Bronze medal – third place	2001 Beijing	10,000m

Yukiko Akaba (赤羽 有紀子, Akaba Yukiko; born 18 October 1979) is a Japanese long-distance runner who specializes in the 10,000 metres, half marathon and marathon events.

== Career ==
She won the silver medal in half marathon at the 1999 Summer Universiade. At the 2001 Summer Universiade she finished eighth in the 5000 metres and won the bronze medal in the 10,000 metres. She finished twentieth in the 10,000 metres at the 2008 Olympic Games, but was less successful in the women's 5000 metres, failing to make the final. Her next global competition came at the 2009 World Championships in Athletics, where she finished 31st in the World Championship marathon race. She also ran at the 2009 IAAF World Half Marathon Championships, but failed to make an impact in either the individual race or with the Japanese team.

In the beginning of the 2010, she entered the Osaka International Ladies Marathon as a possible podium contender, she dropped out mid-race. She soon returned to form, however, clocking a time of 1:11:09 for second place at the Matsue Ladies Half Marathon in March behind Kenyan Obare Doricah. Running at the 2010 London Marathon, she took sixth place with a time of 2:24:55, a personal best for the distance. She won her first race at the 2011 Osaka Marathon, although she did not achieve the time standard to make the Japanese World Championships team. She achieved this at the 2011 London Marathon, taking sixth for a second year running but also achieving a personal best time of 2:24:09 hours. She was chosen to represent Japan at the 2011 World Championships in Athletics and took fifth place in the marathon.

Akaba was eighth at the 2012 Nagoya Marathon, but was chosen as the substitute for the Olympic team due to her World Championship performance. She didn't race at the Olympics, but won the Sanyo Women's Half Marathon later that year. Giving her fastest run since 2009, she won the 2013 All-Japan Corporate Team Half Marathon Championships with a time of 68:59 minutes. She had her second best ever performance at the 2013 London Marathon, where her time of 2:24:43 hours was enough for third place. A course record of 2:27:17 hours followed at the Gold Coast Marathon in Australia in July.

== Achievements ==
- All results regarding marathon, unless stated otherwise

Year	Competition	Venue	Position	Notes
Representing Japan
2009	Osaka Ladies Marathon	Osaka, Japan	2nd	2:25:40
2009	World Championships	Berlin, Germany	31st	2:37:43
2010	London Marathon	London, United Kingdom	6th	2:24:55
2011	Osaka Ladies Marathon	Osaka, Japan	1st	2:26:29
2011	London Marathon	London, United Kingdom	6th	2:24:09
2013	London Marathon	London, United Kingdom	3rd	2:24:43

== Personal bests ==
- 5000 metres - 15:11.17 min (2005)
- 10,000 metres - 31:15.34 min (2008)
- Half marathon - 1:08:11 min (2008)
- Marathon - 2:24:09 (2011)
