= Osaka Women's Marathon =

Annual road race in Osaka, Japan

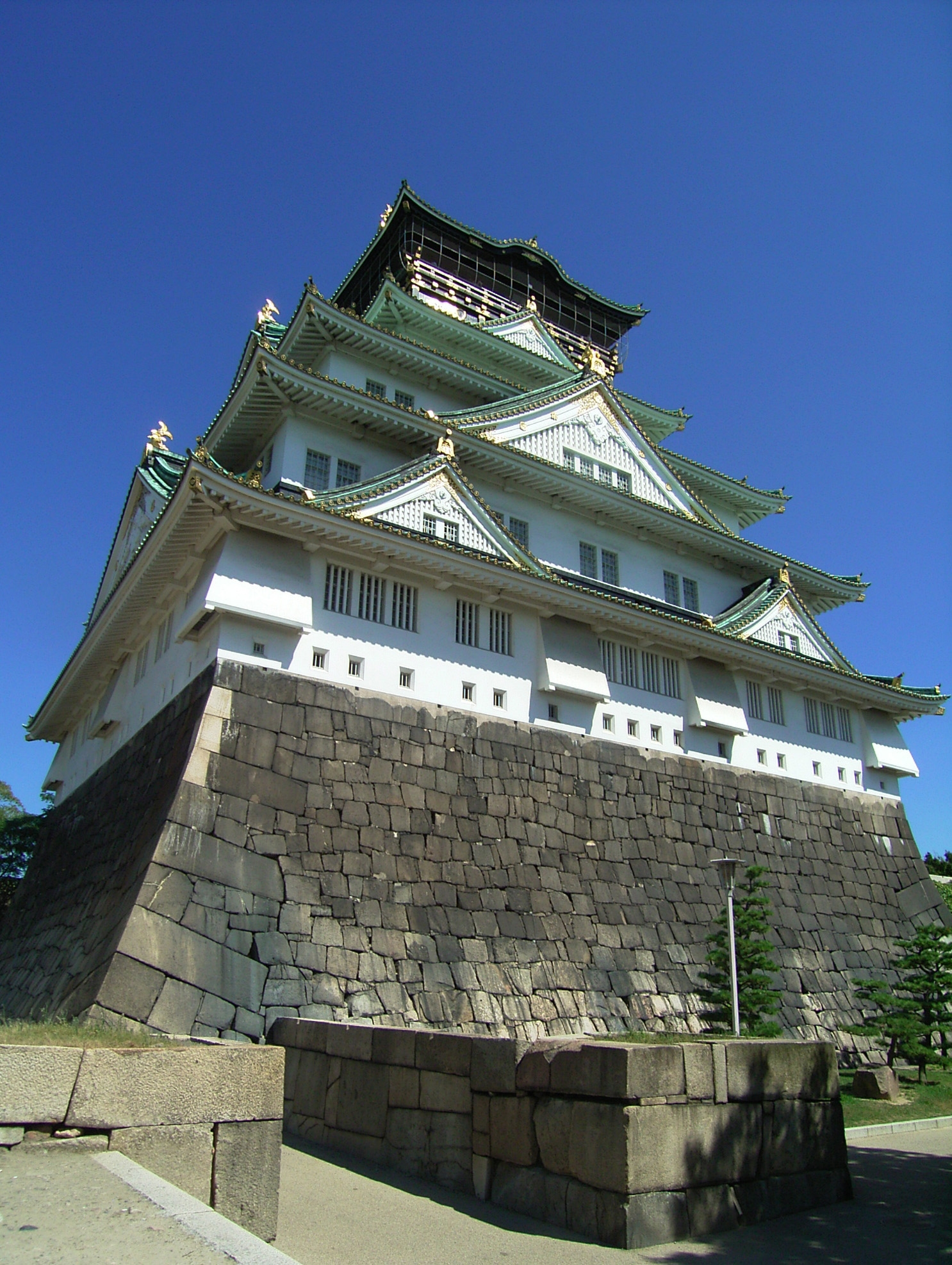
- The city course loops past Osaka Castle twice
- Date: 4th or 5th Sunday of January
- Location: Osaka, Japan
- Event type: Road
- Distance: Marathon
- Primary sponsor: Okumura
- Established: 1982
- Course records: 2:18:51 (Ethiopia) Workenesh Edesa (2024)
- Website: Osaka Women's Marathon
- Participants: 257 finishers (2022); 423 (2020); 366 (2019)

The Osaka International Women's Marathon (大阪国際女子マラソン, Ōsaka Kokusai Joshi Marason) is an annual marathon road race for women over the classic distance of 42.195 kilometres which is held on the 4th or 5th Sunday of January in the city of Osaka, Japan, and hosted by Japan Association of Athletics Federations, Kansai Telecasting Corporation, the Sankei Shimbun, Sankei Sports, Radio Osaka and Osaka City.

The first edition took place on January 24, 1982, and was won by Italy's Rita Marchisio. The 1995 marathon was cancelled due to the Great Hanshin earthquake. The race takes place in the city and passes prominent landmarks such as Osaka Castle. The course was altered in 2011 to allow for faster times by cutting out a number of hilly sections near Osaka Castle. The finish line of the race is at Nagai Stadium, which was the host venue for the 2007 World Championships in Athletics.

The Osaka Half Marathon, open regardless of gender, is held alongside the women's marathon.

The Japanese rock group The Alfee provided a new theme song for Kansai TV's broadcast of the event every year for 31 consecutive years from 1987 until 2018, when the broadcaster announced they would no longer use themes. The band were certified with a Guinness World Record for the achievement in December 2018.

== Winners ==
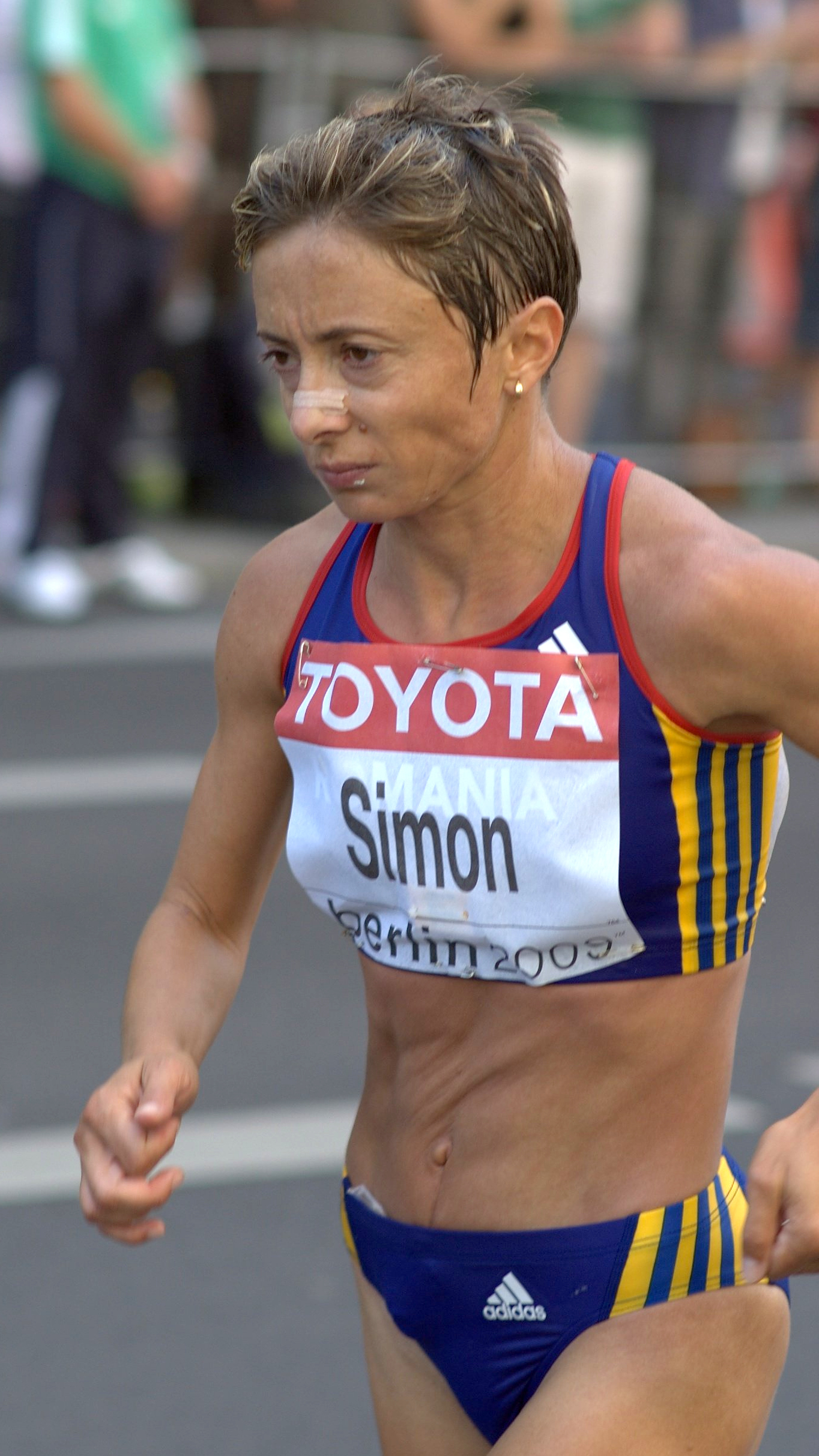
Lidia Șimon is a three-time winner (1998–2000)

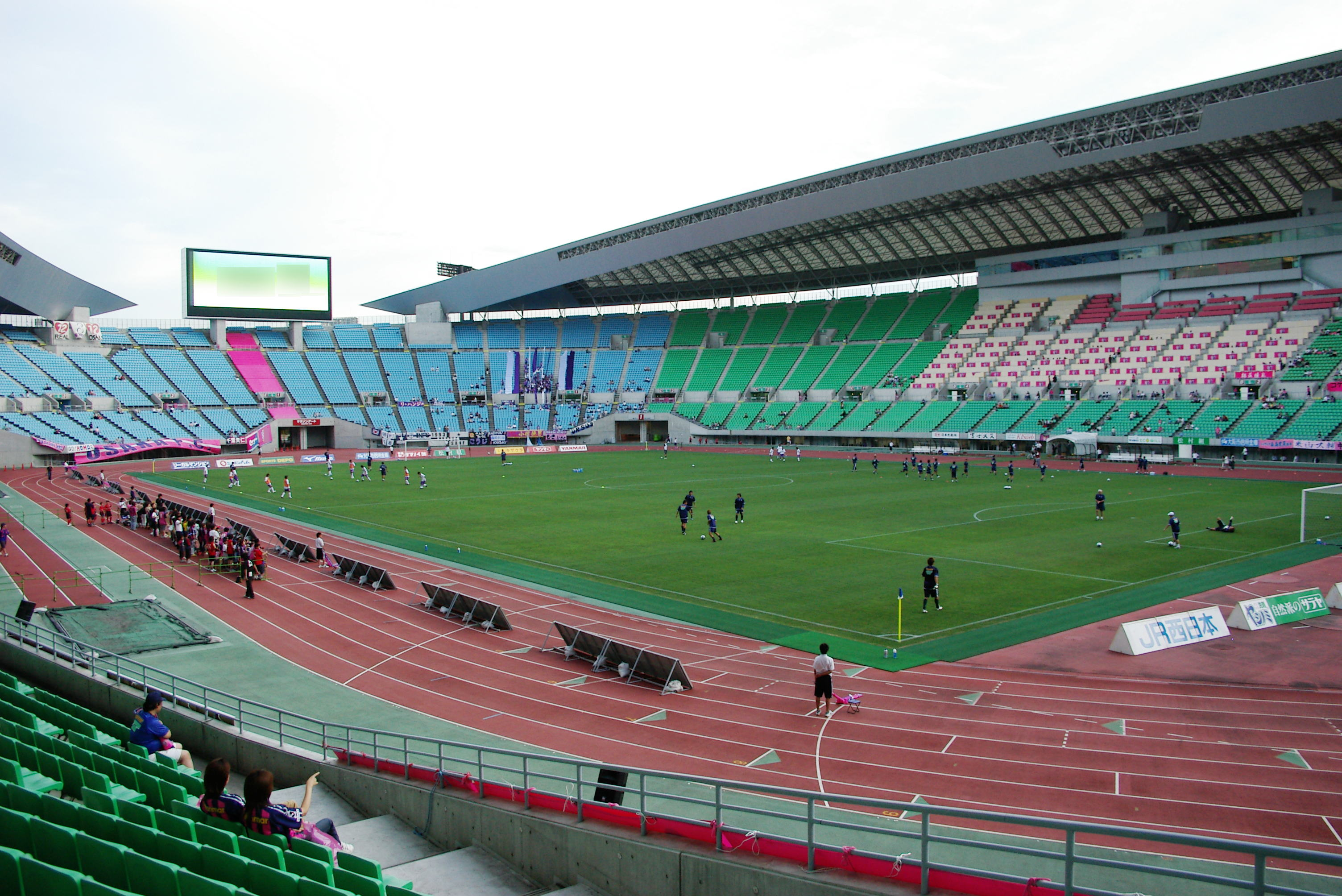
Nagai Stadium, where the marathon race finishes.

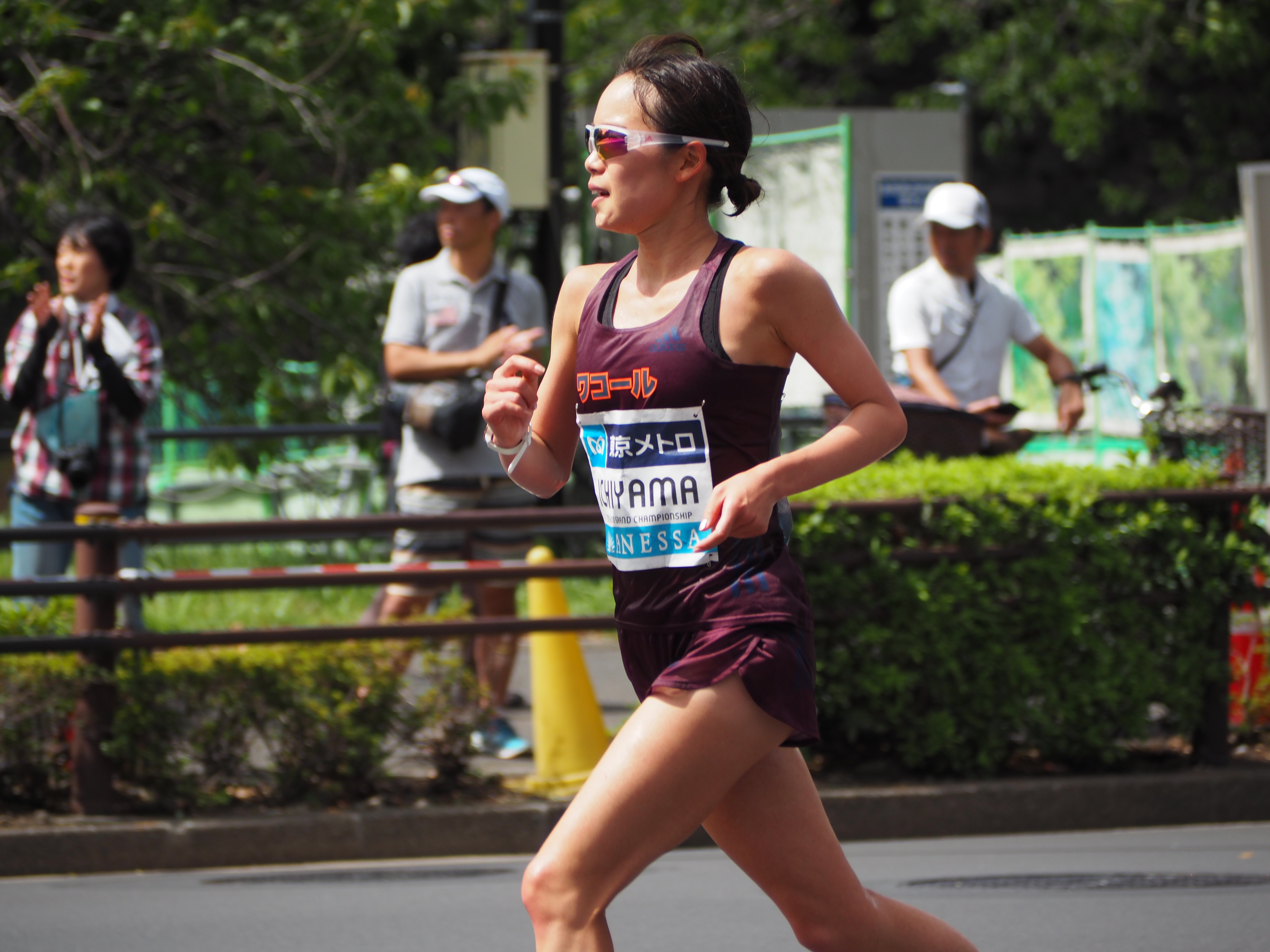
2021 winner Mao Ichiyama (pictured in 2019 Marathon Grand Championship)

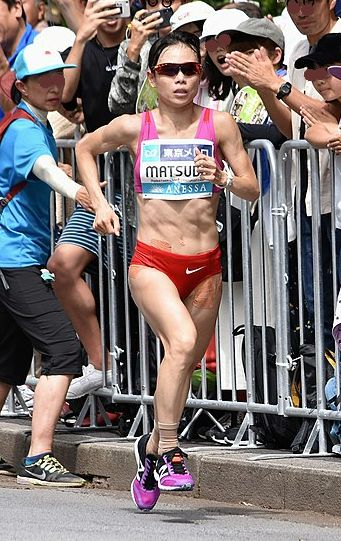
Former winner Mizuki Matsuda (pictured in 2019)

Key: Course record

Edition	Date	Winner	Country	Time (h:m:s)
1st	January 24, 1982	Rita Marchisio	Italy	2:32:55
2nd	January 30, 1983	Carey May	(Republic of Ireland) Ireland	2:29:23
3rd	January 29, 1984	Katrin Dörre	East Germany	2:31:41
4th	January 27, 1985	Carey May (2)	(Republic of Ireland) Ireland	2:28:07
5th	January 26, 1986	Lorraine Moller	New Zealand	2:30:24
6th	January 25, 1987	Lorraine Moller (2)	New Zealand	2:30:40
7th	January 31, 1988	Lisa Ondieki	Australia	2:23:51
8th	January 29, 1989	Lorraine Moller (3)	New Zealand	2:30:21
9th	January 28, 1990	Rosa Mota	Portugal	2:27:47
10th	January 27, 1991	Katrin Dörre (2)	Germany	2:27:43
11th	January 26, 1992	Yumi Kokamo	Japan	2:26:26
12th	January 31, 1993	Junko Asari	Japan	2:26:26
13th	January 30, 1994	Tomoe Abe	Japan	2:26:09
14th	January 29, 1995	Cancelled due to Great Hanshin earthquake		
15th	January 26, 1996	Katrin Dörre-Heinig (3)	Germany	2:26:04
16th	January 26, 1997	Katrin Dörre-Heinig (4)	Germany	2:25:57
17th	January 25, 1998	Lidia Șimon	Romania	2:28:31
18th	January 31, 1999	Lidia Șimon (2)	Romania	2:23:24
19th	January 30, 2000	Lidia Șimon (3)	Romania	2:22:54
20th	January 28, 2001	Yoko Shibui	Japan	2:23:11
21st	January 27, 2002	Lornah Kiplagat	Netherlands	2:23:55
22nd	January 26, 2003	Mizuki Noguchi	Japan	2:21:18
23rd	January 25, 2004	Naoko Sakamoto	Japan	2:25:29
24th	January 30, 2005	Jeļena Prokopčuka	Latvia	2:22:56
25th	January 29, 2006	Catherine Ndereba	Kenya	2:25:05
26th	January 28, 2007	Yumiko Hara	Japan	2:23:48
27th	January 27, 2008	Mara Yamauchi	United Kingdom	2:25:10
28th	January 25, 2009	Yoko Shibui (2)	Japan	2:23:42
29th	January 31, 2010	Amane Gobena	Ethiopia	2:25:14
30th	January 30, 2011	Yukiko Akaba	Japan	2:26:29
31st	January 29, 2012	Risa Shigetomo	Japan	2:23:23
32nd	January 27, 2013	Kayoko Fukushi*	Japan	2:24:21
33rd	January 26, 2014	Yukiko Akaba* (2)	Japan	2:26:00
34th	January 25, 2015	Jeļena Prokopčuka* (2)	Latvia	2:24:07
35th	January 31, 2016	Kayoko Fukushi (2)	Japan	2:22:17
36th	January 29, 2017	Risa Shigetomo (2)	Japan	2:24:22
37th	January 28, 2018	Mizuki Matsuda	Japan	2:22:44
38th	January 27, 2019	Fatuma Sado	Ethiopia	2:25:39
39th	January 26, 2020	Mizuki Matsuda (2)	Japan	2:21:47
40th	January 31, 2021	Mao Ichiyama	Japan	2:21:11
41st	January 30, 2022	Mizuki Matsuda(3)	Japan	2:20:52
42nd	January 29, 2023	Haven Hailu	Ethiopia	2:21:13
43rd	January 28, 2024	Workenesh Edesa	Ethiopia	2:18:51
44th	January 26, 2025	Workenesh Edesa (2)	Ethiopia	2:20:59

* Tetyana Hamera-Shmyrko was suspended by the Ukrainian Athletic Federation for four years from 30 September 2015 until 29 September 2019 due to doping rules violation. All her results from 26 August 2011 to 30 September 2015, including victories in the 2013, 2014 and 2015 editions of the Osaka International Ladies Marathon, were annulled.

== Notes ==
1 2021 edition had male pacemakers including Yuki Kawauchi
