= Tokuji Izumi =

Japanese attorney (born 1939)

Tokuji Izumi (泉 德治, Izumi Tokuji, born January 25, 1939) is a Japanese attorney (Special Counsel of TMI Associates). He was a career judge and a Justice of the Supreme Court of Japan. Following his retirement, Izumi participated in a public campaign against the re-election of two of his former colleagues, Justices Wakui and Nasu, in protest against the votes they had cast in an electoral malapportionment case.
