= Sapporo Half Marathon =

Road running competition in Japan

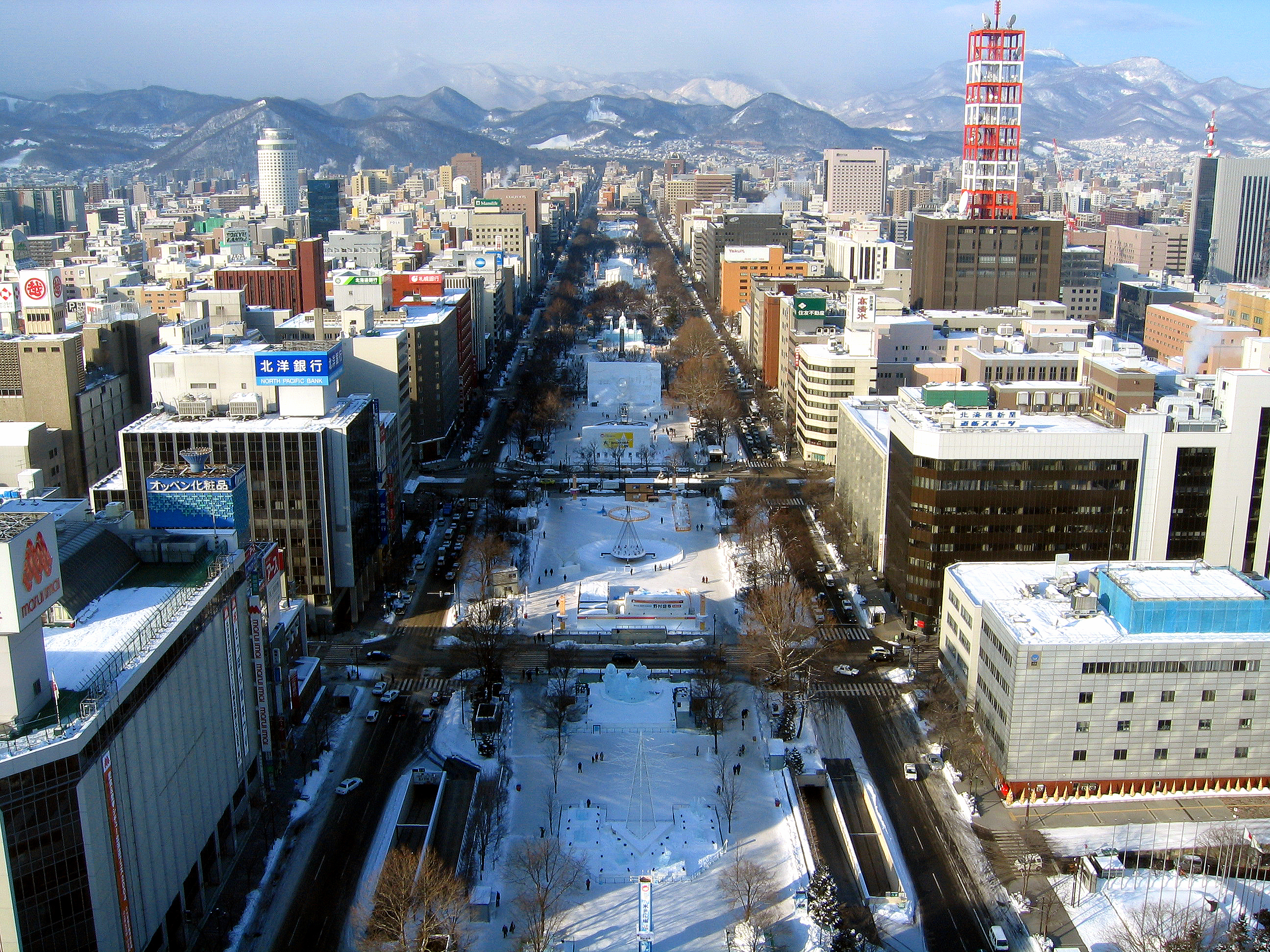
- The streets of the city of Sapporo
- Date: July
- Location: Sapporo, Japan
- Event type: Road
- Distance: Half marathon
- Established: 1958
- Course records: Men's: 59:54 (2007) (Kenya) Mekubo Mogusu; Women's: 1:08:14 (2006) (Japan) Mizuki Noguchi

The Sapporo International Half Marathon (札幌国際ハーフマラソン大会, Sapporo Kokusai hāfumarason taikai) was an annual road running competition over the half marathon distance 21.0975 kilometres (13.1094 mi) which took place each July in Sapporo, Japan.

First held in 1958, the race began as a full marathon competition for men under the moniker of the Hokkai Times Marathon. This lasted until 1973, as it was replaced with a shorter race of 30 km in 1974 and became known as the Times 30K. A women's programme was introduced in 1981, at which point the men's 30 km race was complemented with a women's 20 km. The women's race was slightly extend to the half marathon distance in 1986 and the men's race followed suit the following year. The road racing competition was known as the Sapporo Half Marathon from 1990 onwards.

The race had a strictly looped course in the city of Sapporo which doubled back on itself, having Maruyama Stadium as the start and end point. The competition was broadcast live on national television each year via Nihon TV. The course was certified by AIMS and the Japanese Association of Athletics Federations. The competition doubled up to act as the national selection race for the 2010 IAAF World Half Marathon Championships.

The Japanese Olympic marathon champion Mizuki Noguchi set a women's course record of 1:08:14 in 2006. Kenya's Mekubo Mogusu is the only runner to finish the course in under an hour, with his men's course record set in 2007 standing at 59 minutes and 54 seconds. Four athletes won the race on three occasions: Mogusu, Stephen Mayaka and Juma Ikangaa on the men's side, and Catherine Ndereba on the women's side.

Following the withdrawal of support from its traditional broadcaster, the race ceased to be held after the 2012 edition. On 16 October 2019, the International Olympic Committee announced plans to re-locate the marathon and racewalking events of the Tokyo-based 2020 Summer Olympics to Sapporo due to heat concerns. The plans were made official on 1 November 2019 after Tokyo Governor Yuriko Koike accepted the IOC's decision, despite her belief that the events should have remained in Tokyo.

== Past winners ==
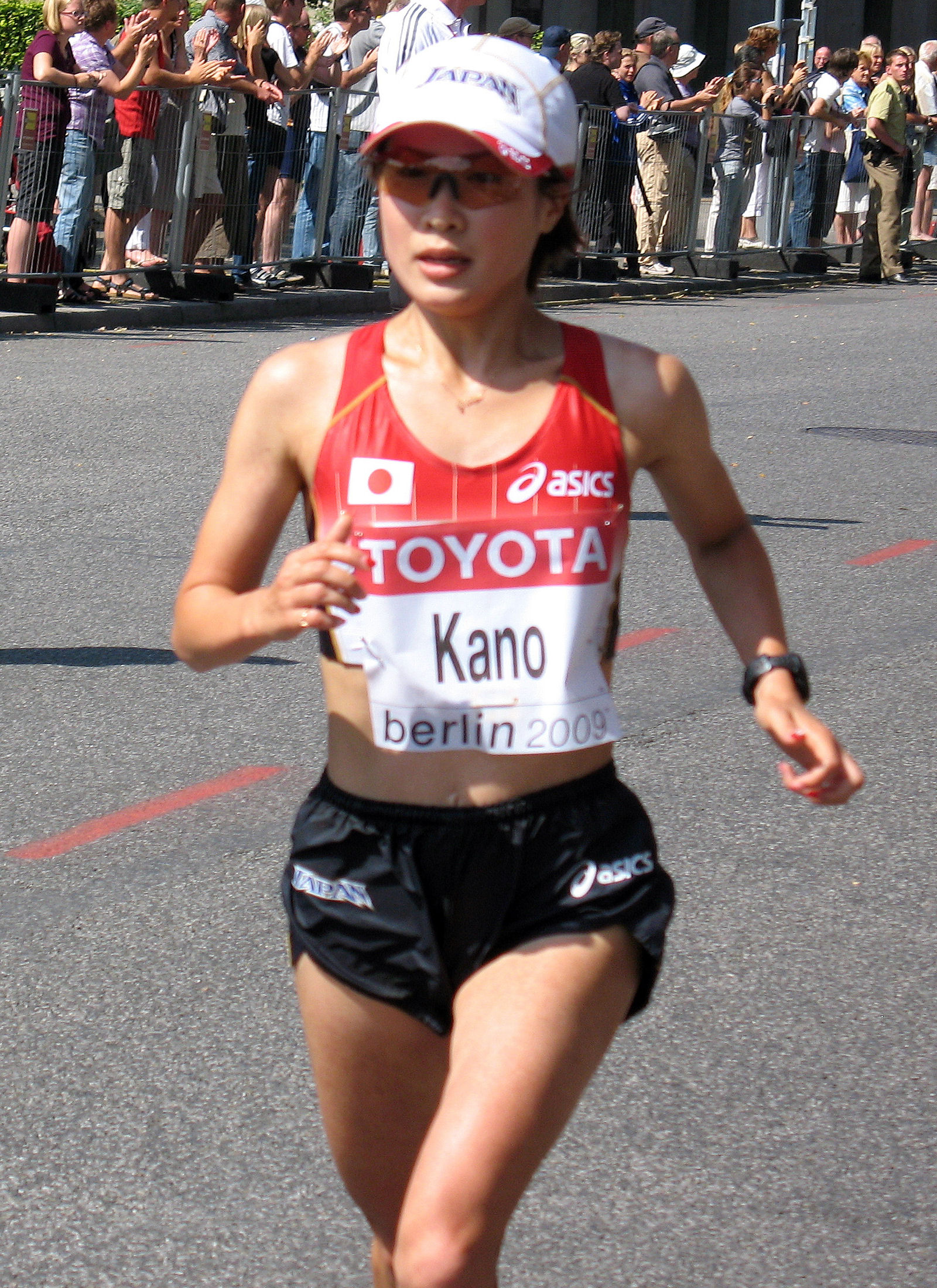
Yuri Kanō won the women's race in 2008 and 2010.

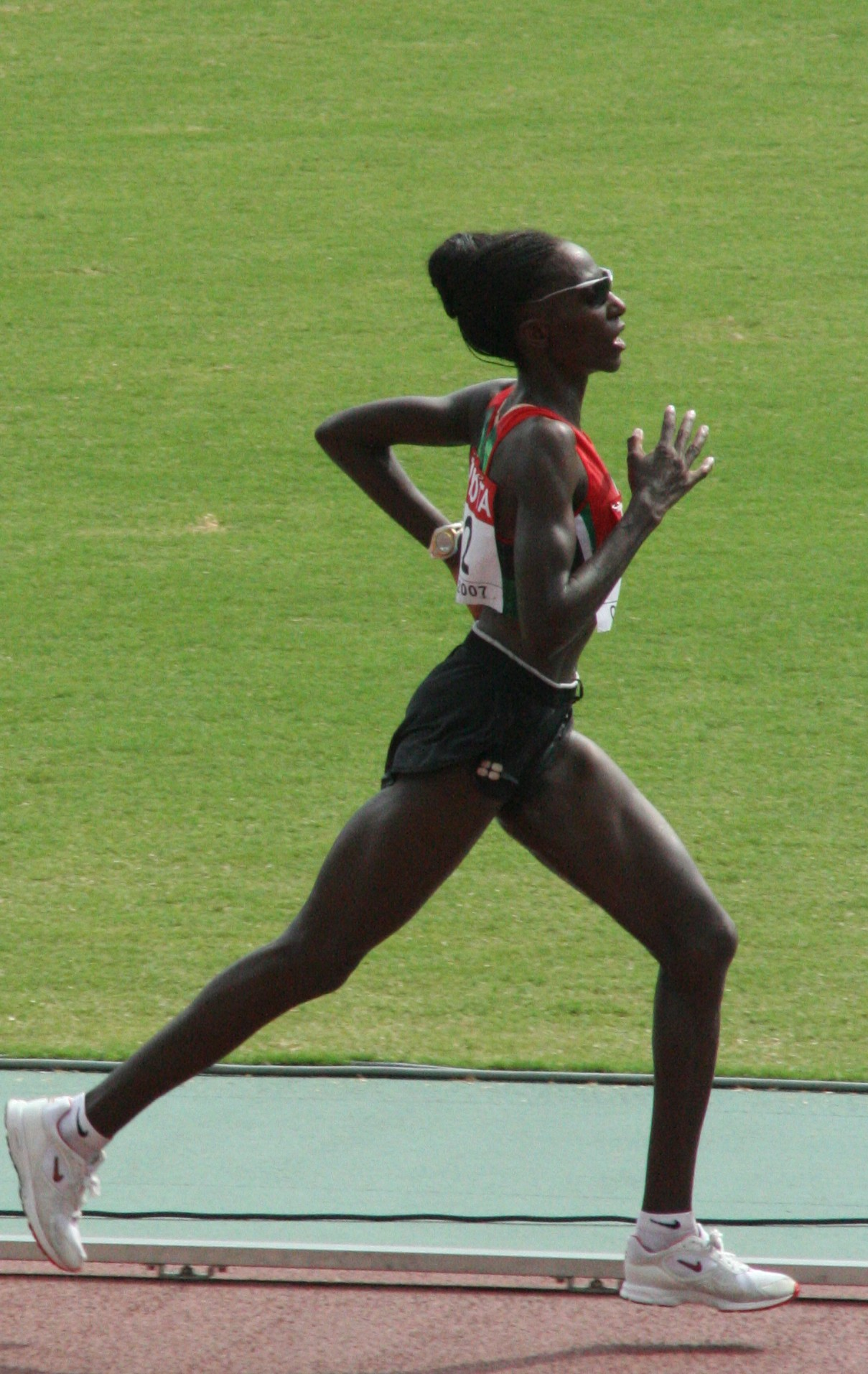
Kenyan Catherine Ndereba has won the women's race a record three times

Key: Course record
Distances: Marathon 30 km 20 km

Edition	Year	Men's winner	Time (h:m:s)	Women's winner	Time (h:m:s)
55th	2012	Martin Mathathi (KEN)	1:01:35	Mai Ito (JPN)	1:10:52
54th	2011	Cyrus Njui (KEN)	1:01:47	Florence Kiplagat (KEN)	1:10:29
53rd	2010	Cyrus Njui (KEN)	1:01:20	Yuri Kanō (JPN)	1:11:46
52nd	2009	Gedion Ngatuny (KEN)	1:00:39	Yurika Nakamura (JPN)	1:09:20
51st	2008	Mekubo Mogusu (KEN)	1:00:52	Yuri Kanō (JPN)	1:08:57
50th	2007	Mekubo Mogusu (KEN)	59:54	Mizuki Noguchi (JPN)	1:08:22
49th	2006	Cyrus Njui (KEN)	1:01:16	Mizuki Noguchi (JPN)	1:08:14
48th	2005	Mekubo Mogusu (KEN)	1:01:28	Catherine Ndereba (KEN)	1:09:24
47th	2004	James Macharia (KEN)	1:01:28	Hiromi Ominami (JPN)	1:08:45
46th	2003	John Kanyi (KEN)	1:02:08	Catherine Ndereba (KEN)	1:08:23
45th	2002	Samuel Kabiru (KEN)	1:01:11	Catherine Ndereba (KEN)	1:08:57
44th	2001	James Wainaina (KEN)	1:01:52	Lidia Șimon (ROM)	1:09:46
43rd	2000	Laban Kagika (KEN)	1:02:16	Naoko Takahashi (JPN)	1:09:10
42nd	1999	John Kanyi (KEN)	1:01:32	Lidia Șimon (ROM)	1:08:51
41st	1998	Erick Wainaina (KEN)	1:02:56	Ari Ichihashi (JPN)	1:11:45
40th	1997	Stephen Mayaka (KEN)	1:03:57	Ari Ichihashi (JPN)	1:11:03
39th	1996	Stephen Mayaka (KEN)	1:02:02	Kazumi Kanbayashi (JPN)	1:09:40
38th	1995	Stephen Mayaka (KEN)	1:01:43	Naomi Sakashita (JPN)	1:10:32
37th	1994	Tadesse Gebre (ETH)	1:04:29	Mari Tanigawa (JPN)	1:13:53
36th	1993	Luketz Swartbooi (NAM)	1:02:02	Olga Appell (MEX)	1:10:38
35th	1992	Kenjirō Jitsui (JPN)	1:02:59	Eriko Asai (JPN)	1:12:20
34th	1991	Hitoshi Saotome (JPN)	1:04:39	Lisa Weidenbach (USA)	1:13:50
33rd	1990	Juma Ikangaa (TAN)	1:03:56	Lisa Weidenbach (USA)	1:12:54
32nd	1989	Juma Ikangaa (TAN)	1:02:56	Lisa Martin (AUS)	1:12:25
31st	1988	Juma Ikangaa (TAN)	1:03:22	Kumi Araki (JPN)	1:13:30
30th	1987	Toshihiro Shibutani (JPN)	1:05:40	Eriko Asai (JPN)	1:14:50
29th	1986	Kazuya Nishimoto (JPN)	1:33:08	Kumi Araki (JPN)	1:15:31
28th	1985	Isamu Sennai (JPN)	1:31:32	Mami Fukao (JPN)	1:10:30
27th	1984	Isamu Sennai (JPN)	1:35:28	Yōko Higuchi (JPN)	1:15:22
26th	1983	Kazuya Nishimoto (JPN)	1:32:57	Naomi Kurahashi (JPN)	1:11:50
25th	1982	Yūji Mori (JPN)	1:37:10	Rumiko Kaneko (JPN)	1:14:48
24th	1981	Tetsuji Iwase (JPN)	1:33:35	Akemi Masuda (JPN)	1:11:40
23rd	1980	Yutaka Taketomi (JPN)	1:34:15	Not held	
22nd	1979	Yutaka Taketomi (JPN)	1:34:22	Not held	
21st	1978	Yasunori Hamada (JPN)	1:32:48	Not held	
20th	1977	Yoshinobu Kitayama (JPN)	1:35:23	Not held	
19th	1976	Noriyasu Mizukami (JPN)	1:34:54	Not held	
18th	1975	Mineteru Sakamoto (JPN)	1:36:52	Not held	
17th	1974	Kimio Ōtsuka (JPN)	1:40:55,6	Not held	
16th	1973	Noriyasu Mizukami (JPN)	2:23:16,8	Not held	
15th	1972	Ryōsuke Matsuoka (JPN)	2:23:42,0	Not held	
14th	1971	Kimio Ōtsuka (JPN)	2:20:46,4	Not held	
13th	1970	Yoshiro Mifune (JPN)	2:22:49,2	Not held	
12th	1969	Ryōichi Masuda (JPN)	2:23:04,0	Not held	
11th	1968	Morio Shigematsu (JPN)	2:24:27,0	Not held	
10th	1967	Kenji Kimihara (JPN)	2:20:16,4	Not held	
9th	1966	Morio Shigematsu (JPN)	2:30:06,2	Not held	
8th	1965	Yoshikazu Funasako (JPN)	2:48:52,2	Not held	
7th	1964	Kenji Kimihara (JPN)	2:17:12	Not held	
6th	1963	Osamu Kawabata (JPN)	2:33:41	Not held	
5th	1962	Yoshitaka Uchikawa (JPN)	2:31:38	Not held	
4th	1961	Yoshiaki Kawashima (JPN)	2:47:56	Not held	
3rd	1960	Yasuo Koshikawa (JPN)	2:34:40	Not held	
2nd	1959	Yoshikazu Igarashi (JPN)	2:38:49	Not held	
1st	1958	Masao Suzuki (JPN)	2:47:31	Not held	
