= List of Japanese records in athletics =

The following are the national records in athletics in Japan maintained by Japan's Association of Athletics Federations (JAAF).

== Outdoor ==
Key to tables: Awaiting ratification Record not kept by JAAF Not ratified or later rescinded by JAAF

=== Men ===
Event	Record	Athlete	Date	Meet	Place	Ref.
100 m	9.95 (+2.0 m/s)	Ryota Yamagata	6 June 2021	Fuse Sprint 2021	Tottori, Japan	
150 m (bend)	15.35 (±0.0 m/s)	Yoshihide Kiryū	17 March 2017		Gold Coast, Australia	
200 m	20.03 (+0.6 m/s)	Shingo Suetsugu	7 June 2003	Japanese Championships	Yokohama, Japan	
300 m	32.20	Kenki Imaizumi	11 October 2024	National Sports Festival	Saga, Japan	
400 m	44.44	Yuki Joseph Nakajima	14 September 2025	World Championships	Tokyo, Japan	
800 m	1:43.45	Ko Ochiai	30 May 2026	Twolaps Middle Distance Circuit	Tokyo, Japan	
1000 m	2:15.24	Ko Ochiai	10 July 2026	Herculis	Fontvieille, Monaco	
1500 m	3:35.42	Kazuki Kawamura	17 July 2021	Hokuren Distance Challenge	Chitose, Japan	
Mile	3:58.89 (Note: Outdoor best, indoor mark ratified as absolute record)	Kiyonari Shibata	11 May 1996		Osaka, Japan	
Mile (road)	3:57.0 h	Soma Nagahara	20 June 2026	Ginza Road Mile	Tokyo, Japan	
2000 m	5:07.24	Fumikazu Kobayashi	14 July 2006		Kortrijk, Belgium	
3000 m	7:40.09	Suguru Osako	7 September 2014	Rieti Meeting	Rieti, Italy	
Two miles	8:24.69	Kensuke Takezawa	3 August 2007	Norwich Union Super Grand Prix	London, United Kingdom	
5000 m	13:08.40	Suguru Osako	18 July 2015	KBC Night of Athletics	Heusden-Zolder, Belgium	
5 km (road)	13:37	Kanta Shimizu	1 October 2023	World Road Running Championships	Riga, Latvia	
10,000 m	27:05.92	Mebuki Suzuki	22 November 2025	Hachioji Long Distance	Hachioji, Japan	
10 km (road)	28:02+	Tomoki Ota	2 February 2025	Kagawa Marugame Half Marathon	Marugame, Japan	
15,000 m (track)	43:38.2	Toshihiko Seko	24 September 1983		Shizuoka, Japan	
15 km (road)	42:08 +	Tomoki Ota	2 February 2025	Kagawa Marugame Half Marathon	Marugame, Japan	
10 Miles (road)	45:40	Masanari Shintaku	19 February 1984		Karatsu, Japan	
20,000 m (track)	57:48.7	Toshihiko Seko	11 May 1985		Odawara, Japan	
20 km (road)	56:26+	Tomoki Ota	2 February 2025	Kagawa Marugame Half Marathon	Marugame, Japan	
One hour	20410 m	Seiji Kushibe	20 October 1996		Tokyo, Japan	
Half marathon	59:27	Tomoki Ota	2 February 2025	Kagawa Marugame Half Marathon	Marugame, Japan	
25,000 m (track)	1:13:55.8+	Toshihiko Seko	22 March 1981		Christchurch, New Zealand	
25 km (road)	1:13:14+	Takayuki Matsumiya	27 February 2005		Kumamoto, Japan	
30,000 m (track)	1:29:18.8	Toshihiko Seko	22 March 1981		Christchurch, New Zealand	
30 km (road)	1:28:00	Takayuki Matsumiya	27 February 2005		Kumamoto, Japan	
Marathon	2:04:55	Suguru Osako	7 December 2025	Valencia Marathon	Valencia, Spain	
50 km (road)	2:44:07	Yuki Kawauchi	19 June 2016	Okinoshima 50K Ultramarathon	Okinoshima, Japan	
100 km (road)	6:06:08	Junpei Yamaguchi	25 June 2023	Lake Saroma Ultramarathon	Yūbetsu, Japan	
24-hour run	273.708 km	Shingo Inoue	13–14 May 2010	IAU 24 Hour World Championships	Brive-la-Gaillarde, France	
110 m hurdles	12.92 (+0.6 m/s)	Rachid Muratake	16 August 2025	Athlete Night Games	Fukui, Japan	
200 m hurdles	22.55	Yoshiro Watanabe	1 October 2017		Itami, Japan	
300 m hurdles	34.22	Ken Toyoda	26 April 2025	Xiamen Diamond League	Xiamen, China	
400 m hurdles	47.89	Dai Tamesue	10 August 2001	World Championships	Edmonton, Canada	
2000 m steeplechase	5:29.89	Ryohei Sakaguchi	25 April 2021	Hyogo Relay Carnival	Kobe, Japan	
3000 m steeplechase	8:03.43	Ryuji Miura	11 July 2025	Herculis	Fontvieille, Monaco	
High jump	2.33 m (Note: indoor mark ratified as absolute record)	Naoyuki Daigo	2 July 2006	Japanese Championships	Kobe, Japan	
Pole vault	5.83 m	Daichi Sawano	3 May 2005		Shizuoka, Japan	
Long jump	8.40 m (+1.5 m/s)	Shotaro Shiroyama	17 August 2019	Athlete Night Games in Fukui — Fukui 9.98Cup	Fukui, Japan	
Triple jump	17.15 m (+0.9 m/s)	Norifumi Yamashita	1 June 1986	Japanese Championships	Tokyo, Japan	
Shot put	18.85 m	Daichi Nakamura	20 May 2018	Golden Grand Prix Osaka	Osaka, Japan	
Discus throw	64.48 m	Masateru Yugami	26 April 2025	Oklahoma Throws Series	Ramona, United States	
Hammer throw	84.86 m	Koji Murofushi	29 June 2003		Prague, Czech Republic	
Javelin throw	87.60 m	Kazuhiro Mizoguchi	27 May 1989		San Jose, United States	
Decathlon	8321 pts	Yuma Maruyama	15–16 April 2026	Mt. SAC Relays	Walnut, United States	
Decathlon	100m (wind) / Long jump (wind) / Shot put / High jump / 400m / 110m H (wind) / Discus / Pole vault / Javelin / 1500m; 10.85 (±0.0 m/s) / 7.32 m (+2.0 m/s) / 14.60 m / 1.93 m / 48.60 / 14.07 (+1.0 m/s) / 47.53 m / 5.00 m / 59.86 m / 4:33.58					
3000 m walk (track)	11:29.49	Eiki Unami	18 May 2008		Komatsu, Japan	
5000 m walk (track)	18:16.97	Ryo Hamanishi	18 May 2024	66th East Japan Corporate Championships	Kumagaya, Japan	
5 km walk (road)	18:44+	Eiki Takahashi	16 April 2016	Japanese Race Walking Championships	Wajima, Japan	
10,000 m walk (track)	37:25.21	Eiki Takahashi	14 November 2020	Juntendo University Long Distance meeting	Inzai, Japan	
10 km walk (road)	38:03	Eiki Takahashi	16 April 2016	Japanese Race Walking Championships	Wajima, Japan	
15 km walk (road)	57:15+	Yusuke Suzuki	15 March 2015	Asian Race Walking Championships	Nomi, Japan	
20,000 m walk (track)	1:21:36.7	Yuga Yamashita	8 January 2017	Race Walk Meeting of Tokyo Gakugei University	Koganei, Japan	
20 km walk (road)	1:16:10	Toshikazu Yamanishi	16 February 2025	Japanese 20km Race Walking Championships	Kobe, Japan	
Half Marathon walk (road)	1:20:34	Toshikazu Yamanishi	15 February 2026	Japanese Half Marathon Race Walking Championships	Kobe, Japan	
Two hours walk (track)	25739 m	Takehiro Sonohara	22 February 1987		Tokyo, Japan	
30,000 m walk (track)	2:19:49.2	Takehiro Sonohara	22 February 1987		Tokyo, Japan	
30 km walk (road)	2:01:26+	Masatora Kawano	27 October 2024	All Japan Race Walking competition	Takahata, Japan	
35 km walk (road)	2:21:47	Masatora Kawano	27 October 2024	All Japan Race Walking competition	Takahata, Japan	
Marathon walk (road)	2:55:14	Masatora Kawano	25 October 2026	All Japan Race Walking competition Takahata	Takahata, Japan	
50,000 m walk (track)	4:07:24.7	Fumio Imamura	17 March 1991		Kanazawa, Japan	
50 km walk (road)	3:36:45	Masatora Kawano	27 October 2019	58th All Japan Race Walking	Takahata, Japan	
4 × 100 m relay	37.43	Japan; Shuhei Tada; Kirara Shiraishi; Yoshihide Kiryū; Abdul Hakim Sani Brown	5 October 2019	World Championships	Doha, Qatar	
4 × 200 m relay	1:21.44	Waseda University; Yudai Nishi; Reona Miura; Kenta Shinjo; Tomasu Chida	25 September 2022		Yokohama, Japan	
Swedish relay	1:48.27	Japan Select; Shingo Kawabata; Nobuharu Asahara; Kenji Tabata; Jun Osakada	15 September 2001		Yokohama, Japan	
4 × 400 m relay	2:58.33	Yuki Joseph Nakajima; Kaito Kawabata; Fuga Sato; Kentaro Sato	10 August 2024	Olympic Games	Paris, France	
4 × 800 m relay	7:20.34	JPN Select; Daiki Nemoto; Daichi Setoguchi; Takahiro Hayashi; Jun Mitake	19 October 2019	Denka Athletics Challenge Cup	Niigata, Japan	
4 × 1500 m relay	15:19.33	University Select; Tomokazu Sakashita; Kenji Mizuuchi; Hiroyuki Miyake; Masayoshi Kagetani	23 June 2002		Odawara, Japan	
Ekiden relay	1:58:58	Japan; Takayuki Matsumiya (13:34); Yuki Sato (27:52); Atsushi Sato (13:59); Kazuo Ietani (28:26); Michitaka Hosokawa (14:10); Takanobu Otsubo (20:57)	23 November 2005	International Chiba Ekiden	Chiba, Japan	

=== Women ===
Event	Record	Athlete	Date	Meet	Place	Ref.
60 m	7.46 (+0.6 m/s)	Mayumi Watanabe	20 June 2010		Fukushima, Japan	
100 y	10.56+ (+0.5 m/s)	Arisa Kimishima	11 March 2023	Sydney Track Classic	Sydney, Australia	
100 m	11.21 (+1.7 m/s)	Chisato Fukushima	29 April 2010	Mikio Oda Memorial Athletic Game	Hiroshima, Japan	
150 m (bend)	18.04 (NWI)	Mariko Nagano	4 February 2017	Nitro Athletics Round 1	Melbourne, Australia	
200 m	22.79 (+1.0 m/s)	Fuka Idoabigeiru (Note: by JAAF source; Abigeirufuka Ido by World Athletics source)	3 August 2025	Fuji Hokuroku World Trial	Fujiyoshida, Japan	
300 m	36.93	Nanako Matsumoto	12 October 2024	National Sports Festival	Saga, Japan	
300 m	36.79	Arie Flores (Note: born as Arie Aoki in Japan; started for Peru at the competition, nevertheless ratified by Asian Athletics as Asian record)	12 October 2024	National Sports Festival	Saga, Japan	
400 m	51.75	Asami Tanno	3 May 2008		Fukuroi, Japan	
600 m	1:28.41	Ayako Jinnouchi	9 July 2008	Hokuren Distance Challenge	Abashiri, Japan	
800 m	1:59.93	Rin Kubo	15 July 2024	Long Distance Time Trials Meet	Kashihara, Japan	
1000 m	2:37.33	Nozomi Tanaka	22 June 2022	Hokuren Distance Challenge	Fukagawa, Japan	
1500 m	3:59.19	Nozomi Tanaka	4 August 2021	Olympic Games	Tokyo, Japan	
Mile	4:34.81 (Note: outdoor best; indoor mark ratified as absolute record)	Ikuko Tamura	15 June 2002		Amagasaki, Japan	
Mile (road)	4:32.0 h	Nozomi Tanaka	3 September 2023		Düsseldorf, Germany	
2000 m	5:47.17	Tomoka Kimura	13 September 2016		Marseille, France	
3000 m	8:32.29	Nozomi Tanaka	18 July 2026	London Athletics Meet	London, United Kingdom	
Two miles	9:35.04	Yuko Kawakami	27 June 1998		Cork, Ireland	
5000 m	14:29.18	Nozomi Tanaka	8 September 2023	Memorial Van Damme	Brussels, Belgium	
5 km (road)	15:21	Yuzu Nishide	7 December 2025		Kumamoto, Japan	
5 km (road)	15:21	Manami Nishiyama	7 December 2025		Kumamoto, Japan	
10,000 m	30:20.44	Hitomi Niiya	4 December 2020	Japanese Long Distance Championships	Osaka, Japan	
10 km (road)	30:55 Mx	Rino Goshima	26 February 2023	10K Facsa Castellón	Castellón, Spain	
10 km (road)	31:44 Wo	Masako Chiba	11 February 1996		Karatsu, Japan	
10 km (road)	30:52+ a	Kayoko Fukushi	5 February 2006		Marugame, Japan	
15 km (road)	46:55+ Mx	Kayoko Fukushi	5 February 2006	Kagawa Marugame Half Marathon	Marugame, Japan	
10 miles (road)	53:08	Mai Endo	15 April 2007	Kasumigaura 10 Miles	Tsuchiura, Japan	
One hour	17952 m	Junko Kataoka	1 October 1994		Tokyo, Japan	
20,000 m (track)	1:06:48.8	Izumi Maki	19 September 1993		Amagasaki, Japan	
20 km (road)	1:03:13+ Mx	Hitomi Niiya	19 January 2020	Houston Half Marathon	Houston, United States	
Half marathon	1:06:38 Mx	Hitomi Niiya	19 January 2020	Houston Half Marathon	Houston, United States	
Half marathon	1:08:03 Wo	Rino Goshima	13 February 2022	Yamaguchi All-Corporate Half Marathon Championships	Yamaguchi, Japan	
Half marathon	1:07:47 Wo	Mizuki Noguchi	6 January 2004	Miyazaki Half Marathon	Miyazaki, Japan	
25,000 m (track)	1:33:53.4+	Tamaki Okuno	10 October 1996		Tokyo, Japan	
25 km (road)	1:22:13+ Mx	Mizuki Noguchi	25 September 2005	Berlin Marathon	Berlin, Germany	
25 km (road)	1:22:26+ Wo	Honami Maeda	28 January 2024	Osaka Women's Marathon	Osaka, Japan	
25 km (road)	1:22:08+ a	Naoko Takahashi	6 December 1998		Bangkok, Thailand	
30,000 m (track)	1:53:03.6	Tamaki Okuno	10 October 1996		Tokyo, Japan	
30 km (road)	1:38:35 Mx	Honami Maeda	16 February 2020	Ohme 30 km Road Race	Tokyo, Japan	
30 km (road)	1:38:36+ Wo	Honami Maeda	28 January 2024	Osaka Women's Marathon	Osaka, Japan	
Marathon	2:18:59 Wo	Honami Maeda	28 January 2024	Osaka Women's Marathon	Osaka, Japan	
100 km (road)	6:33:11 Mx	Tomoe Abe	25 June 2000		Kitami, Hokkaido, Japan	
24 hours (road)	271.987 km	Miho Nakata	19 October 2025	IAU 24 Hour World Championship	Albi, France	
100 m hurdles	12.73 (+1.1 m/s)	Mako Fukube	25 September 2022	70th All Japan Corporate Team Championships	Gifu, Japan	
400 m hurdles	55.34	Satomi Kubokura	26 June 2011	Osaka Championships	Osaka, Japan	
2000 m steeplechase	6:19.55	Yuno Yamanaka	25 April 2021	Hyogo Relay Carnival	Kobe, Japan	
3000 m steeplechase	9:24.72	Miu Saito	15 September 2025	World Championships	Tokyo, Japan	
High jump	1.96 m	Miki Imai	15 September 2001		Yokohama, Japan	
Pole vault	4.48 m	Misaki Morota	2 October 2023	Asian Games	Hangzhou, China	
Long jump	6.97 m (+0.5 m/s)	Sumire Hata	14 July 2023	Asian Championships	Bangkok, Thailand	
Triple jump	14.16 m (+0.7 m/s)	Mariko Morimoto	3 June 2023	Japanese Championships	Osaka, Japan	
Shot put	18.22 m	Chinatsu Mori	18 April 2004		Hamamatsu, Japan	
Discus throw	59.03 m	Nanaka Kori	23 March 2019		Kitakyushu, Japan	
Hammer throw	69.89 m	Joy McArthur	7 April 2023	Ron & Sharlene Allice Trojan Invitational	Los Angeles, United States	
Javelin throw	68.92 m	Haruka Kitaguchi	12 September 2026	World Athletics Ultimate Championship	Budapest, Hungary	
Heptathlon	5975 pts (NWI)	Yuki Yamasaki	22–23 May 2021		Kitakyushu, Japan	
Heptathlon	100m H (wind) / High jump / Shot put / 200m (wind) / Long jump (wind) / Javelin / 800m; 14.00 (NWI) / 1.65 m / 12.39 m / 24.63 (NWI) / 6.01 m (NWI) / 48.62 m / 2:13.95					
Decathlon	7244 pts (NWI)	Yuki Yamasaki	10–11 November 2018		Aichi, Japan	
Decathlon	100m (wind) / Long jump (wind) / Shot put / High jump / 400m / 110m H (wind) / Discus / Pole vault / Javelin / 1500m; 12.13 (NWI) / 5.80 m (NWI) / 12.14 m / 1.65 m / 44.46 / 14.29 (NWI) / 32.59 m / 2.40 m / 57.24 m / 5:19.99					
3000 m walk (track)	12:25.01	Mayumi Kawasaki	2 June 2007		Naka, Japan	
5000 m walk (track)	20:42.25	Kumiko Okada	18 May 2019		Kumagaya, Japan	
5 km walk (road)	21:27+	Mayumi Kawasaki	17 April 2010		Wajima, Japan	
5 km walk (road)	21:25	Mayumi Kawasaki	7 July 2006		Naka, Japan	
10,000 m walk (track)	42:51.82	Kumiko Okada	8 December 2019		Nagasaki, Japan	
10 km walk (road)	42:46	Kumiko Okada	1 January 2024	72nd New Year Race Walk	Tokyo, Japan	
15 km walk (road)	1:05:45	Nanako Fuji	18 February 2024		Kobe, Japan	
20,000 m walk (track)	1:38:03.3	Rei Inoue	6 February 2011		Wakayama, Japan	
20 km walk (road)	1:26:33	Nanako Fujii	16 February 2025	Japanese 20km Race Walking Championships	Kobe, Japan	
Half Marathon walk (road)	1:33:27	Nanako Fujii	23 May 2026	XXXIX Gran Premio Cantones de A Coruña de Marcha	La Coruña, Spain	
30 km walk (road)	2:21:02+	Kumiko Okada	16 April 2023	Japanese 35 km Racewalking Championships	Wajima, Japan	
35 km walk (road)	2:44:11	Kumiko Okada	16 April 2023	Japanese 35 km Racewalking Championships	Wajima, Japan	
Marathon walk (road)	3:29:10	Ayane Yanai	25 October 2026	All Japan Race Walking competition Takahata	Takahata, Japan	
50 km walk (road)	4:19:56	Masumi Fuchise	14 April 2019	Japanese Race Walking Championships	Wajima, Japan	
4 × 100 m relay	43.33	Japan; Masumi Aoki; Arisa Kimishima; Mei Kodama; Midori Mikase	22 July 2022	World Championships	Eugene, United States	
4 × 200 m relay	1:34.57	Japan; Miku Yamada; Naoka Miyake; Mei Kodama; Shuri Aono	12 May 2019	IAAF World Relays	Yokohama, Japan	
Swedish relay	2:06.36	Company's sports club Team; Satomi Watanabe; Mayumi Maki; Wada Kubokura; Sayaka Aoki	15 October 2011		Odawara, Japan	
4 × 400 m relay	3:28.91	Japan; Seika Aoyama; Kana Ichikawa; Asami Chiba; Sayaka Aoki	29 August 2015	World Championships	Beijing, China	
4 × 800 m relay	8:33.77	Higashiōsaka High School; Rin Kitamura; Runa Asano; Misa Tamura; Rin Kubo	13 July 2024	Higashiosaka City OV30 Record Meet	Osaka, Japan	
4 × 1500 m relay	18:31.18	Hitachi Team; Mina Ogawa; Ishizuka; Sayuri Kumagai; Hitomi Nakasaka	26 May 1996		Hitachinaka, Japan	
Ekiden relay	2:16:13 Mx	Japan; Yoko Shibui; Aki Fujikawa; Kei Satomura; Takami Ominami; Noriko Geji; Hiromi Ominami	28 February 1998		Beijing, China	

=== Mixed ===
Event	Record	Athlete	Date	Meet	Place	Ref.
4 × 400 m relay	3:12.08	Japan; Kenki Imaizumi; Abigeirufuka Ido; Takuho Yoshizu; Nanako Matsumoto	13 September 2025	World Championships	Tokyo, Japan	
2×2×400 m relay	3:38.36	Japan; Ayano Shiomi; Allon Tatsunami Clay	11 May 2019	IAAF World Relays	Yokohama, Japan	
Shuttle hurdle relay	55.59	Japan; Ayako Kimura; Shunya Takayama; Masumi Aoki; Taio Kanai	11 May 2019	IAAF World Relays	Yokohama, Japan	

== Indoor ==
=== Men ===
Event	Record	Athlete	Date	Meet	Place	Ref.
50 m	5.75	Nobuharu Asahara	24 February 2002	Meeting Pas de Calais	Liévin, France	
55 m	6.29 A	Shingo Kawabata	14 February 2004		Reno, United States	
60 m	6.52	Shuhei Tada	1 March 2024	World Championships	Glasgow, United Kingdom	
100 m	10.41	Nobuharu Asahara	4 February 2002		Tampere, Finland	
200 m	20.63	Koji Ito	5 March 1999	World Championships	Maebashi, Japan	
400 m	45.76	Shunji Karube	9 March 1997	World Championships	Paris, France	
600 m	1:15.47	Allon Tatsunami Clay	27 February 2026	Big Ten Conference Championships	Indianapolis, United States	
800 m	1:45.17	Allon Clay	30 January 2026	Penn State National Open	State College, United States	
1000 m	2:17.29	Allon Clay	13 February 2026	BU David Hemery Valentine Invitational	Boston, United States	
1500 m	3:39.51	Nanami Arai	27 February 2020	Boston University Last Chance Invitational	Boston, United States	
Mile	3:54.84	Ryoma Aoki	10 February 2024	BU David Hemery Valentine Invitational	Boston, United States	
3000 m	7:42.56+	Keita Satoh	11 February 2024	Millrose Games	New York City, United States	
Two miles	8:14.71	Keita Satoh	11 February 2024	Millrose Games	New York City, United States	
5000 m	13:09.45	Keita Satoh	26 January 2024	BU John Thomas Terrier Classic	Boston, United States	
50 m hurdles	6.75	Masahiko Sugii	4 March 1987		Kobe, Japan	
50 m hurdles	6.75	Hiroshi Kakimori	4 March 1987		Kobe, Japan	
55 m hurdles	7.39 A	Masato Naito	14 February 2004		Reno, United States	
60 m hurdles	7.49 (Semi-Final)	Shusei Nomoto	21 March 2026	World Championships	Toruń, Poland	
60 m hurdles	7.49 (Final)	Shusei Nomoto	21 March 2026	World Championships	Toruń, Poland	
High jump	2.35 m	Naoto Tobe	2 February 2019	Weltklasse in Karlsruhe	Karlsruhe, Germany	
Pole vault	5.77 m A	Seito Yamamoto	15 January 2016	Pole Vault Summit	Reno, United States	
Long jump	8.21 m (Note: indoor best; outdoor mark ratified as absolute record)	Shunsuke Izumiya	23 March 2025	World Championships	Nanjing, China	
Triple jump	16.70 m	Norifumi Yamashita	11 February 1992		Osaka, Japan	
Shot put	18.07 m	Yasutada Noguchi	18 February 2004		Tianjin, China	
Heptathlon	5831 pts	Akihiko Nakamura	20–21 February 2016	Asian Championships	Doha, Qatar	
Heptathlon	60m / Long jump / Shot put / High jump / 60m H / Pole vault / 1000m; 7.03 / 7.13 m / 11.60 m / 1.94 m / 8.13 / 4.90 m / 2:32.88					
5000 m walk	21:10.01	Hirofumi Sakai	7 March 1987	World Championships	Indianapolis, United States	
4 × 200 m relay	1:27.04	Hosei University; Wataru Iwanaga; Tatsuo Sugimoto; Kuniaki Masukawa; Haruyasu Kato	3 March 1991		Yokohama, Japan	
4 × 400 m relay	3:05.90	Japan; Kazuhiro Takahashi; Jun Osakada; Masayoshi Kan; Shunji Karube	6 March 1999	World Championships	Maebashi, Japan	
4 × 800 m relay	8:48.6 h	Japan; Shunji Kawasaki; Katsumi Nakao; Susumu Kawasho; Takashi Sugisaki	19 March 1961		Tokyo, Japan	

=== Women ===
Event	Record	Athlete	Date	Meet	Place	Ref.
50 m	6.47	Emiko Konishi	9 March 1985		Kobe, Japan	
60 m	7.29	Chisato Fukushima	10 March 2012	World Championships	Istanbul, Turkey	
200 m	24.11	Motoka Arai	26 February 2000		Yokohama, Japan	
400 m	53.64	Asami Tanno	1 March 2005		Tianjin, China	
800 m	2:00.78	Miho Sugimori	22 February 2003		Yokohama, Japan	
1500 m	4:08.46	Nozomi Tanaka	4 February 2024	New Balance Indoor Grand Prix	Boston, United States	
Mile	4:28.94	Nozomi Tanaka	4 February 2023	New Balance Indoor Grand Prix	Boston, United States (Note: by official results source; New York by JAAF source, a typo)	
3000 m	8:36.03	Nozomi Tanaka	2 March 2024	World Championships	Glasgow, United Kingdom	
Two miles	9:16.76	Nozomi Tanaka	11 February 2024	Millrose Games	New York City, United States	
5000 m	14:51.26	Nozomi Tanaka	15 February 2025	BU David Hemery Valentine Invitational	Boston, United States	
50 m hurdles	7.19	Emi Akimoto	5 March 1986		Kobe, Japan	
55 m hurdles	7.69 A	Yvonne Kanazawa	25 January 1997	Rocky Mountain Cup	Colorado Springs, United States	
60 m hurdles	8.01	Masumi Aoki	12 February 2023 (Note: by official result source; 23 February 2012 by JAAF source, a typo)	Asian Championships	Astana, Kazakhstan	
High jump	1.91 m	Megumi Sato	15 January 1986		Osaka, Japan	
High jump	1.91 m	Megumi Sato	11 February 1989		Osaka, Japan	
High jump	1.91 m	Megumi Sato	11 March 1990		Yokohama, Japan	
High jump	1.91 m	Miki Imai	25 February 1998		Beijing, China	
High jump	1.91 m	Miki Imai	15 February 2001		Stockholm, Sweden	
High jump	1.91 m	Miki Imai	5 February 2003		Dortmund, Germany	
Pole vault	4.35 m	Misaki Morota	3 February 2024	Japanese Championships	Osaka, Japan	
Long jump	6.64 m	Sumire Hata	12 February 2023	Asian Championships	Astana, Kazakhstan	
Triple jump	13.66 m	Mariko Morimoto	11 February 2023	Asian Championships	Astana, Kazakhstan	
Shot put	17.46 m	Chinatsu Mori	8 February 2004		Tianjin, China	
Pentathlon	4078 pts	Yuki Yamasaki	10 February 2023	Asian Championships	Astana, Kazakhstan	
Pentathlon	60m H / High jump / Shot put / Long jump / 800m; 8.67 / 1.63 m / 12.56 m / 5.78 m / 2.18.32					
3000 m walk	12:42.65	Yuko Sato	11 February 1994		Osaka, Japan	
4 × 200 m relay	1:42.80	Japan; Masayo Kitagawa; Ayako Nomura; Kimiko Yokoyama; Kyoko Kumata	3 March 1991		Yokohama, Japan	
4 × 400 m relay	3:38.43	Japan; Mayu Kida; Rina Fujimaki; Makiko Yoshida; Miho Sugimori	22 February 2003		Yokohama, Japan	

== See also ==
- Japan Championships in Athletics
