= List of Asian records in athletics =

Asian records in athletics are the best marks set in an event by an athlete who competes for a member nation of the Asian Athletics Association. The organisation is responsible for ratification and it analyses each record before approving it. Records may be set in any continent and at any competition, providing that the correct measures are in place (such as wind-gauges) to allow for a verifiable and legal mark.

== Key to tables ==
Awaiting ratification Record not kept by AAA Not ratified or later rescinded by AAA

a = aided road course according to IAAF rule 260.28
# = not recognised by association
! = timing by photo-electric cell

== Outdoor ==
=== Men ===
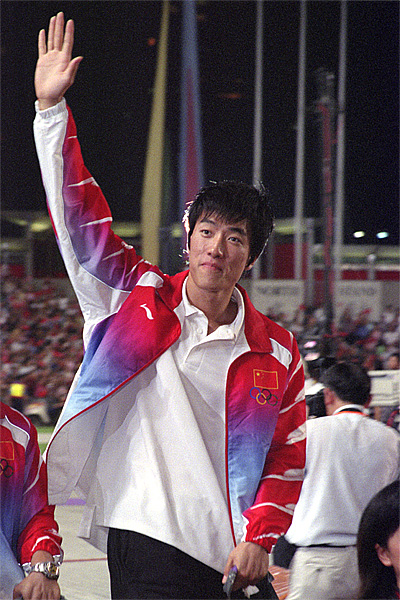
110 metre hurdles record holder Liu Xiang is an Olympic gold medallist, World Outdoor and Indoor Champion, and former world record holder.

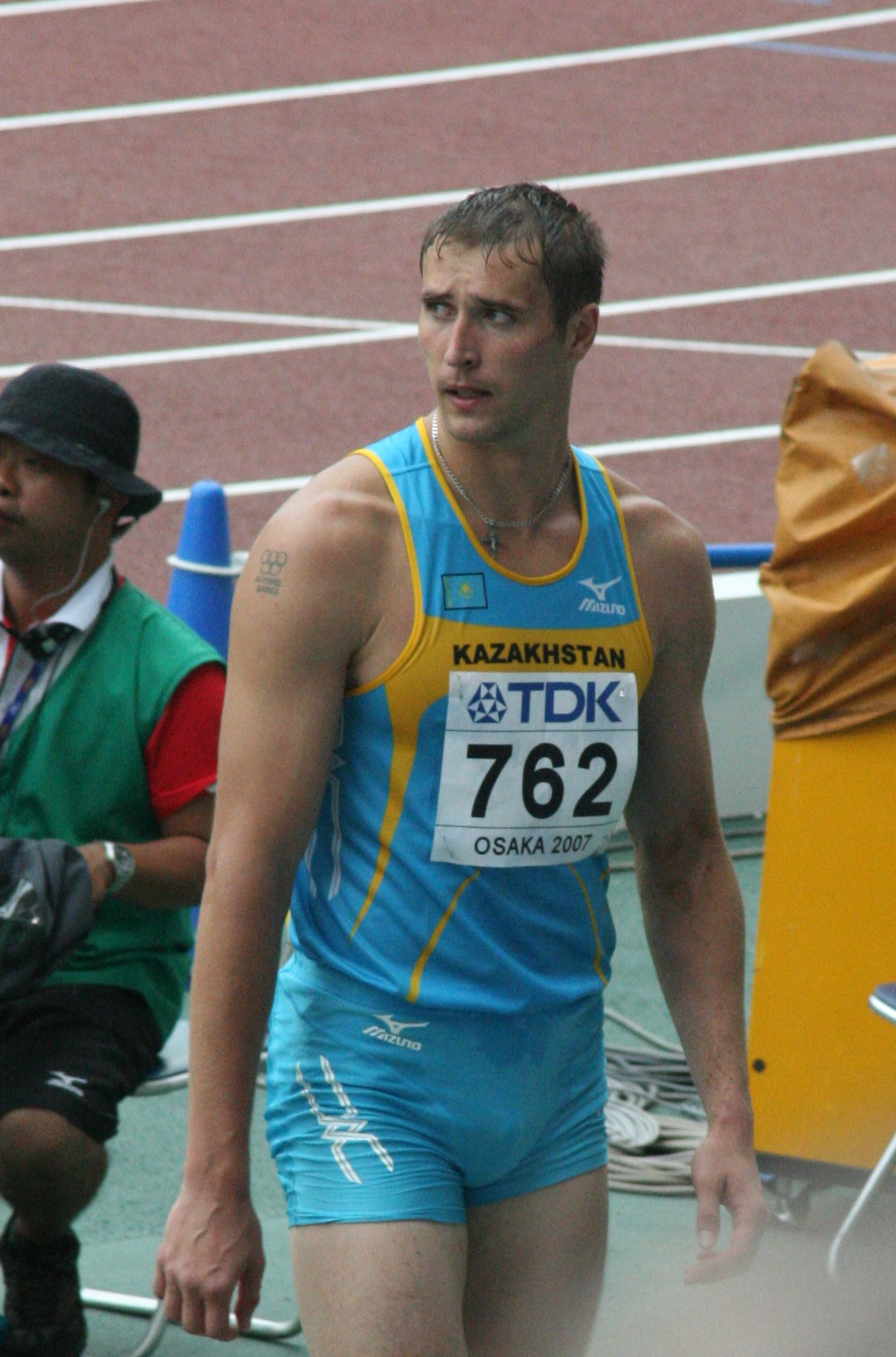
Decathlon record holder Dmitriy Karpov is a World Championship and Olympic medallist.

Event	Record	Athlete	Nationality	Date	Meet	Place	Ref.
100 y	9.43+ (−0.4 m/s)	Su Bingtian	China	17 June 2014	Golden Spike Ostrava	Ostrava, Czech Republic	
100 m	9.83 (+0.9 m/s)	Su Bingtian	China	1 August 2021	Olympic Games	Tokyo, Japan	
150 m (bend)	15.16 (+1.4 m/s)	Yupun Abeykoon	Sri Lanka	24 April 2022	Perseo Trophy	Rieti, Italy	
200 m	19.88 (+0.9 m/s)	Xie Zhenye	China	21 July 2019	Diamond League	London, United Kingdom	
200 m	19.88 (−0.3 m/s)	Puripol Boonson	Thailand	27 September 2026	Asian Games	Aichi-Nagoya, Japan	
300 m	32.20	Kenki Imaizumi	Japan	11 October 2024	National Sports Festival	Saga, Japan	
400 m	43.93	Yousef Ahmed Masrahi	Saudi Arabia	23 August 2015	World Championships	Beijing, China	
600 m	1:15.77	Mohamed Nasir Abbas	Qatar	1 February 2019		Pretoria, South Africa	
800 m	1:42.79	Yusuf Saad Kamel	Bahrain	29 July 2008	Herculis	Fontvieille, Monaco	
1000 m	2:14.72	Yusuf Saad Kamel	Bahrain	22 July 2008	DN Galan	Stockholm, Sweden	
1500 m	3:29.14	Rashid Ramzi	Bahrain	14 July 2006	Golden Gala	Rome, Italy	
Mile	3:47.97	Daham Najim Bashir	Qatar	29 July 2005	Bislett Games	Oslo, Norway	
Mile (road)	4:01.26	Ryoji Tatezawa	Japan	1 October 2023	World Road Running Championships	Riga, Latvia	
2000 m	4:55.57	Mohamed Suleiman	Qatar	8 June 1995		Rome, Italy	
3000 m	7:29.60	Birhanu Balew	Bahrain	16 May 2026	Shanghai Diamond League	Shaoxing/Keqiao, China	
Two miles	8:13.16	Rashid Ramzi	Bahrain	8 June 2008	Prefontaine Classic	Eugene, United States	
5000 m	12:45.70	Birhanu Balew	Bahrain	5 September 2026	Memorial van Damme	Brussels, Belgium	
5 km (road)	13:05	Birhanu Balew	Bahrain	9 December 2023		Khobar, Saudi Arabia	
10,000 m	26:38.76	Abdullah Ahmad Hassan	Qatar	5 September 2003	Memorial Van Damme	Brussels, Belgium	
10 km (road)	26:54	Birhanu Balew	Bahrain	26 April 2025	Adizero: Road to Records	Herzogenaurach, Germany	
15,000 m (track)	43:38.2	Toshihiko Seko	Japan	24 September 1983		Shizuoka, Japan	
15 km (road)	41:53+	Abraham Cheroben	Bahrain	17 September 2017	Copenhagen Half Marathon	Copenhagen, Denmark	
15 km (road)	41:25+	Birhanu Balew	Bahrain	14 February 2026	Ras Al Khaimah Half Marathon	Ras Al Khaimah, United Arab Emirates	
10 miles (road)	45:40	Hisatoshi Shintaku	Japan	19 February 1984		Karatsu, Japan	
20,000 m (track)	57:48.7	Toshihiko Seko	Japan	11 May 1985		Odawara, Japan	
20 km (road)	55:51+	Abraham Cheroben	Bahrain	17 September 2017	Copenhagen Half Marathon	Copenhagen, Denmark	
20 km (road)	55:22+	Birhanu Balew	Bahrain	14 February 2026	Ras Al Khaimah Half Marathon	Ras Al Khaimah, United Arab Emirates	
One hour	20410 m	Seiji Kushibe	Japan	20 October 1996		Tokyo, Japan	
Half marathon	58:23	Birhanu Balew	Bahrain	14 February 2026	Ras Al Khaimah Half Marathon	Ras Al Khaimah, United Arab Emirates	
25,000 m (track)	1:13:55.8+	Toshihiko Seko	Japan	22 March 1981		Christchurch, New Zealand	
25 km (road)	1:13:14+	Takayuki Matsumiya	Japan	27 February 2005		Kumamoto, Japan	
30,000 m (track)	1:29:18.8	Toshihiko Seko	Japan	22 March 1981		Christchurch, New Zealand	
30 km (road)	1:28:00	Takayuki Matsumiya	Japan	27 February 2005		Kumamoto, Japan	
Marathon	2:04:43	El Hassan El-Abbassi	Bahrain	2 December 2018	Valencia Marathon	Valencia, Spain	
50 km (road)	2:44:07	Yuki Kawauchi	Japan	19 June 2016	Okinoshima 50K Ultramarathon	Oki Islands, Japan	
100 km (road)	6:06:08	Junpei Yamaguchi	Japan	25 June 2023	Lake Saroma Ultramarathon	Yūbetsu, Japan	
24-hour run	273.708 km	Shingo Inoue	Japan	13–14 May 2010	IAU 24 Hour World Championships	Brive-la-Gaillarde, France	
110 m hurdles	12.88 (+1.1 m/s)	Liu Xiang	China	11 July 2006	Athletissima	Lausanne, Switzerland	
200 m hurdles	22.55	Yoshiro Watanabe	Japan	1 October 2017		Itami, Japan	
300 m hurdles	33.84	Abderrahman Samba	Qatar	12 June 2025	Bislett Games	Oslo, Norway	
400 m hurdles	46.98	Abderrahman Samba	Qatar	30 June 2018	Meeting de Paris	Paris, France	
2000 m steeplechase	5:14.53	Saif Saeed Shaheen	Qatar	13 May 2005		Doha, Qatar	
3000 m steeplechase	7:53.63	Saif Saeed Shaheen	Qatar	3 September 2004	Memorial Van Damme	Brussels, Belgium	
High jump	2.43 m	Mutaz Essa Barshim	Qatar	5 September 2014	Memorial Van Damme	Brussels, Belgium	
Pole vault	6.00 m	EJ Obiena	Philippines	10 June 2023	Bergen Jump Challenge	Bergen, Norway	
Pole vault	6.00 m	EJ Obiena	Philippines	26 August 2023	World Championships	Budapest, Hungary	
Long jump	8.48 m (+0.6 m/s)	Mohamed Salman Al-Khuwalidi	Saudi Arabia	2 July 2006		Sotteville-lès-Rouen, France	
Triple jump	17.68 m (+1.0 m/s)	Wu Ruiting	China	4 August 2025	Chinese Championships	Quzhou, China	
Shot put	21.80 m	Mohammed Tolo	Saudi Arabia	21 June 2024	Meeting de Atletismo Madrid	Madrid, Spain	
Discus throw	69.32 m	Ehsan Haddadi	Iran	3 June 2008		Tallinn, Estonia	
Hammer throw	84.86 m	Koji Murofushi	Japan	29 June 2003		Prague, Czech Republic	
Javelin throw	92.97 m	Arshad Nadeem	Pakistan	8 August 2024	Olympic Games	Paris, France	
Decathlon	8725 pts	Dmitriy Karpov	Kazakhstan	23–24 August 2004	Olympic Games	Athens, Greece	
Decathlon	100m (wind) / Long jump (wind) / Shot put / High jump / 400m / 110m H (wind) / Discus / Pole vault / Javelin / 1500m; 10.50 (+2.2 m/s) / 7.81 m (−0.9 m/s) / 15.93 m / 2.09 m / 46.81 / 13.97 (+1.5 m/s) / 51.65 m / 4.60 m / 55.54 m / 4:38.11						
5000 m walk (track)	18:16.97	Ryo Hamanishi	Japan	18 May 2024	66th East Japan Corporate Championships	Kumagaya, Japan	
5 km walk (road)	19:04+ #	Yusuke Suzuki	Japan	15 March 2015	Asian Race Walking Championships	Nomi, Japan	
10,000 m walk (track)	37:25.21	Eiki Takahashi	Japan	14 November 2020	Juntendo University Long Distance meeting	Inzai, Japan	
10 km walk (road)	37:44	Wang Zhen	China	18 September 2010	World Race Walking Challenge	Beijing, China	
15 km walk (road)	57:15+	Yusuke Suzuki	Japan	15 March 2015	Asian Race Walking Championships	Nomi, Japan	
20,000 m walk (track)	1:18:03.3	Bo Lingtang	China	7 April 1994		Beijing, China	
20 km walk (road)	1:16:10	Toshikazu Yamanishi	Japan	16 February 2025	Japanese 20km Race Walking Championships	Kobe, Japan	
Half Marathon walk (road)	1:20:34	Toshikazu Yamanishi	Japan	15 February 2026	Japanese Half Marathon Race Walking Championships	Kobe, Japan	
30,000 m walk (track)	2:19:49.2	Takehiro Sonohara	Japan	22 February 1987		Tokyo, Japan	
30 km walk (road)	2:01:26+	Masatora Kawano	Japan	27 October 2024	All Japan Race Walking competition	Takahata, Japan	
35 km walk (road)	2:21:47	Masatora Kawano	Japan	27 October 2024	All Japan Race Walking competition	Takahata, Japan	
50,000 m walk (track)	3:48:13.7	Zhao Yongsheng	China	7 May 1994		Fana, Norway	
Marathon walk (road)	2:55:14	Masatora Kawano	Japan	25 October 2026	All Japan Race Walking competition Takahata	Takahata, Japan	
50 km walk (road)	3:36:06	Yu Chaohong	22 October 2005	Chinese National Games	Nanjing, China		
4 × 100 m relay	37.43	Shuhei Tada; Kirara Shiraishi; Yoshihide Kiryū; Abdul Hakim Sani Brown	Japan	5 October 2019	World Championships	Doha, Qatar	
4 × 200 m relay	1:20.83	Shandong Team; Wang Shengjie; Xie Yuqiang; Zhang Yaorong; Qiao Zhen	China	23 September 2021	National Games	Xi'an, China	
4 × 200 m relay	1:20.83	Guangdong Team; Su Bingtian; Zhang Ruixian; Mo Youxue; Yan Haibin	China	23 September 2021	National Games	Xi'an, China	
4 × 400 m relay	2:58.33	Yuki Joseph Nakajima; Kaito Kawabata; Fuga Sato; Kentaro Sato	Japan	10 August 2024 (Note: by official result source; 8 August 2024 by AAA source, a typo)	Olympic Games	Paris, France	
4 × 800 m relay	7:06.66	Majed Saeed Sultan; Salem Amer Al-Badri; Abdulrahman Suleiman; Abubaker Ali Kamal	Qatar	25 August 2006	Memorial Van Damme	Brussels, Belgium	
4 × 1500 m relay	15:10.77	Mohamad Al-Garni; Hashim Salah Mohamed; Maaz Abdelrahman Shagag; Abubaker Ali Kamal	Qatar	25 May 2014	IAAF World Relays	Nassau, Bahamas	
Marathon road relay (Ekiden)	1:58:58	Takayuki Matsumiya (13:34); Yuki Sato (27:52); Atsushi Sato (13:59); Kazuo Ietani (28:26); Michitaka Hosokawa (14:10); Takanobu Otsubo (20:57)	Japan	23 November 2005	International Chiba Ekiden	Chiba, Japan	

=== Women ===
Event	Record	Athlete	Nationality	Date	Meet	Place	Ref.
100 y	10.56+ (+0.5 m/s)	Arisa Kimishima	Japan	11 March 2023	Sydney Track Classic	Sydney, Australia	
100 y	10.0 h NWI	Chi Cheng	Chinese Taipei	13 June 1970		Portland, United States	
100 m	10.79 (±0.0 m/s)	Li Xuemei	China	18 October 1997	National Games	Shanghai, China	
150 m (bend)	16.82+ (+1.7 m/s)	Susanthika Jayasinghe	Sri Lanka	31 August 2007	World Championships	Osaka, Japan	
200 m	22.01 (±0.0 m/s)	Li Xuemei	China	22 October 1997	National Games	Shanghai, China	
300 m	35.85	Salwa Eid Naser	Bahrain	9 August 2025	Mityng Ambasadorów Białostockiego Sportu	Białystok, Poland	
400 m	48.14	Salwa Eid Naser	Bahrain	3 October 2019	World Championships	Doha, Qatar	
600 m	1:24.84	Tharushi Karunarathne	Sri Lanka	18 June 2024	XIX Reunión Internacional Villa de Bilbao	Bilbao, Spain	
800 m	1:55.54	Liu Dong	China	9 September 1993	National Games	Beijing, China	
1000 m	2:41.08	Miho Sugimori	Japan	19 June 2002		Yokohama, Japan	
1500 m	3:50.46	Qu Yunxia	China	11 September 1993	National Games	Beijing, China	
Mile	4:17.75	Maryam Yusuf Jamal	Bahrain	14 September 2007	Memorial Van Damme	Brussels, Belgium	
Mile (road)	4:35.32 Wo	Nozomi Tanaka	Japan	1 October 2023	World Road Running Championships	Riga, Latvia	
2000 m	5:29.43+ !	Wang Junxia	China	12 September 1993	National Games	Beijing, China	
2000 m	5:31.88	Maryam Yusuf Jamal	Bahrain	7 June 2009		Eugene, United States	
3000 m	8:06.11	Wang Junxia	China	13 September 1993	National Games	Beijing, China	
Two miles	9:13.85	Mimi Belete	Bahrain	31 May 2014	Prefontaine Classic	Eugene, United States	
5000 m	14:28.09	Jiang Bo	China	23 October 1997	National Games	Shanghai, China	
5 km (road)	14:46+ Mx	Kalkidan Gezahegne	Bahrain	3 October 2021	The Giants Geneva	Geneva, Switzerland	
10,000 m	29:31.78	Wang Junxia	China	8 September 1993	National Games	Beijing, China	
10 km (road)	29:38 Mx	Kalkidan Gezahegne	Bahrain	3 October 2021	The Giants Geneva	Geneva, Switzerland	
15 km (road)	45:40+	Violah Jepchumba	Bahrain	1 April 2017	Prague Half Marathon	Prague, Czech Republic	
10 miles (road)	52:02	Norah Jeruto	Kazakhstan	12 April 2026	Cherry Blossom Ten Mile Run	Washington, D.C., United States	
One hour	17952 m	Junko Kataoka	Japan	1 October 1994		Tokyo, Japan	
20,000 m (track)	1:06:48.8	Izumi Maki	Japan	19 September 1993		Amagasaki, Japan	
20 km (road)	1:01:50+	Violah Jepchumba	Bahrain	1 April 2017	Prague Half Marathon	Prague, Czech Republic	
Half marathon	1:05:22	Violah Jepchumba	Bahrain	1 April 2017	Prague Half Marathon	Prague, Czech Republic	
25,000 m (track)	1:33:53.4+	Tamaki Okuno	Japan	10 October 1996		Tokyo, Japan	
25 km (road)	1:21:04	Desi Mokonin	Bahrain	18 December 2022	Kolkata 25K	Kolkata, India	
30,000 m (track)	1:53:03.6	Tamaki Okuno	Japan	10 October 1996		Tokyo, Japan	
30 km (road)	1:38:49+ Mx	Mizuki Noguchi	Japan	25 September 2005	Berlin Marathon	Berlin, Germany	
30 km (road)	1:38:35 Mx	Honami Maeda	Japan	16 February 2020	Ohme 30 km Road Race	Tokyo, Japan	
30 km (road)	1:38:36+ Wo	Honami Maeda	Japan	28 January 2024	Osaka Women's Marathon	Osaka, Japan	
Marathon	2:19:12 Mx	Mizuki Noguchi	Japan	25 September 2005	Berlin Marathon	Berlin, Germany	
Marathon	2:20:29 Wo	Mao Ichiyama	Japan	8 March 2020	Nagoya Women's Marathon	Aichi, Japan	
Marathon	2:18:59 Wo	Honami Maeda	Japan	28 January 2024	Osaka Women's Marathon	Osaka, Japan	
100 km (road)	6:33:11	Tomoe Abe	Japan	25 June 2000		Yūbetsu, Japan	
24 hours (road)	271.987 km	Miho Nakata	Japan	19 October 2025	IAU 24 Hour World Championship	Albi, France	
100 m hurdles	12.44 (−0.8 m/s)	Olga Shishigina	Kazakhstan	27 June 1995		Lucerne, Switzerland	
300 m hurdles	40.20	Mariam Kareem	United Arab Emirates	18 July 2026	Night of Athletics	Heusden-Zolder, Belgium	
400 m hurdles	53.09	Kemi Adekoya	Bahrain	24 August 2023	World Championships	Budapest, Hungary	
Mile steeplechase	4:40.13 WB	Winfred Yavi	Bahrain	22 August 2025	Memorial Van Damme	Brussels, Belgium	
2000 m steeplechase	5:54.16+	Ruth Jebet	Bahrain	27 August 2016	Meeting Areva	Saint-Denis, France	
3000 m steeplechase	8:44.39	Winfred Yavi	Bahrain	30 August 2024	Golden Gala	Roma, Italy	
High jump	2.00 m	Nadezhda Dubovitskaya	Kazakhstan	8 June 2021	Kazakh Championships	Almaty, Kazakhstan	
Pole vault	4.73 m	Niu Chunge	China	31 May 2026	National Grand Prix 4	Bengbu, China	
Long jump	7.01 m (+1.4 m/s)	Yao Weili	China	5 June 1993	National Championships	Jinan, China	
Triple jump	15.25 m (+1.7 m/s)	Olga Rypakova	Kazakhstan	4 September 2010	Continental Cup	Split, Croatia	
Shot put	21.76 m	Li Meisu	China	23 April 1988	Shijiazhuang Track Classic	Shijiazhuang, China	
Discus throw	71.68 m	Xiao Yanling	China	14 March 1992		Beijing, China	
Hammer throw	78.64 m	Zhang Jiale	China	16 August 2026	Chinese Championships	Quzhou, China	
Hammer throw	79.62 m	Zhang Jiale	China	12 September 2026	National Hammer Throw Competition	Huai'an, China	
Javelin throw	71.74 m	Yan Ziyi	China	23 May 2026	Xiamen Diamond League	Xiamen, China	
Heptathlon	6942 pts	Ghada Shouaa	Syria	25–26 May 1996	Hypo-Meeting	Götzis, Austria	
Heptathlon	100m H (wind) / High jump / Shot put / 200m (wind) / Long jump (wind) / Javelin / 800m; 13.78 (+0.3 m/s) / 1.87 m / 15.64 m / 23.78 (+0.6 m/s) / 6.77 m (+0.6 m/s) / 54.74 m / 2:13.61						
Decathlon	7798 pts	Irina Naumenko	Kazakhstan	25–26 September 2004	Decastar	Talence, France	
Decathlon	100m (wind) / Discus / Pole vault / Javelin / 400m / 100m H (wind) / Long jump (wind) / Shot put / High jump / 1500m; 12.58 / 34.63 m / 3.30 m / 37.57 m / 55.91 / 14.42 / 5.98 m / 12.51 m / 1.77 m / 4:59.03						
5000 m walk (track)	20:34.76	Liu Hong	China	16 September 2012	Chinese University Games	Tianjin, China	
5 km walk (road)	21:05	Yang Xizhen	China	8 April 2023	Chinese Race Walking Grand Prix 2	Taicang, China	
5 km walk (road)	20:41+	Liu Hongyu	China	8 May 1999	Oder-Neisse Racewalking Grand Prix	Eisenhüttenstadt, Germany	
10,000 m walk (track)	41:37.9	Gao Hongmiao	China	7 April 1994		Beijing, China	
10 km walk (road)	41:16	Wang Yan	China	8 May 1999	Oder-Neisse Race Walk Grand Prix	Eisenhüttenstadt, Germany	
20,000 m walk (track)	1:29:32.4	Hongjuan Song	China	24 October 2003	National City Games	Changsha, China	
20 km walk (road)	1:23:49	Yang Jiayu	China	20 March 2021	Chinese Race Walking Championships	Huangshan, China	
Half Marathon walk (road)	1:31:39	Yunyan Jiang	China	1 March 2026	Chinese Race Walking Grand Prix	Taicang, China	
30,000 m walk (track)	1:53:03.6	Tamaki Okuno	Japan	10 October 1996		Tokyo, Japan	
30 km walk (road)	2:15:37+	Liu Hong	China	16 April 2023	Japanese 35 km Racewalking Championships	Wajima, Japan	
35 km walk (road)	2:38:42	Liu Hong	China	16 April 2023	Japanese 35 km Racewalking Championships	Wajima, Japan	
Marathon walk (road)	3:24:48	Chen Mengyuan	China	2 March 2026	Chinese Race Walking Grand Prix	Taicang, China	
50,000 m walk (track)	3:48:13.7	Tamaki Okuno	Japan	7 May 1994		Fana, Norway	
50 km walk (road)	3:59:15	Liu Hong	China	9 March 2019	Chinese Race Walk Grand Prix	Huangshan, China	
4 × 100 m relay	42.23	Sichuan Team; Xiao Lin; Li Yali; Liu Xiaomei; Li Xuemei	China	23 October 1997	National Games	Shanghai, China	
4 × 200 m relay	1:32.76	Liang Xiaojing; Wei Yongli; Kong Lingwei; Ge Manqi	China	12 May 2019	IAAF World Relays	Yokohama, Japan	
4 × 400 m relay	3:24.28	Hebei Team; An Xiaohong; Bai Xiaoyun; Cao Chunying; Ma Yuqin	China	13 September 1993	National Games	Beijing, China	
4 × 800 m relay	8:16.2 h	Liaoning Team; Liu Dong; Chen Yumei; Qu Yunxia; Liu Li	China	3 October 1991	National Championships	Shanghai, China	
4 × 1500 m relay	18:31.18	Hitachi Team; Mina Ogawa; Ishizuka; Sayuri Kumagai; Hitomi Nakasaka	Japan	26 May 1996		Hitachinaka, Japan	
Ekiden relay	2:11:41	Jiang Bo 15:42 (5 km); Dong Yanmei 31:36 (10 km); Zhao Fengting 15:16 (5 km); Ma Zaijie 31:01 (10 km); Lan Lixin 15:50 (5 km); Li Na 22:16 (7.195 km)	China	28 February 1998		Beijing, China	

=== Mixed ===
Event	Record	Athlete	Nationality	Date	Meet	Place	Ref.
4 × 100 m relay	40.78	Chen Jinfeng; Liu Guoyi; Shi Junhao; Chen Yujie	China	29 September 2026	Asian Games	Nagoya, Japan	
4 × 400 m relay	3:11.82	Musa Isah; Aminat Yusuf Jamal; Salwa Eid Naser; Abbas Abubakar Abbas	Bahrain	29 September 2019	World Championships	Doha, Qatar	

== Indoor ==
=== Men ===
Event	Record	Athlete	Nationality	Date	Meet	Place	Ref.
50 m	5.72	Anvar Kuchmuradov	Uzbekistan	4 February 1994		Moscow, Russia	
50 m	5.72	Vitaliy Savin	Kazakhstan	9 February 1995		Madrid, Spain	
50 m	5.69+	Gennadiy Chernovol	Kazakhstan	24 February 2002	Meeting Pas de Calais	Liévin, France	
55 m	6.29 A	Shingo Kawabata	Japan	14 February 2004		Reno, United States	
60 m	6.42	Su Bingtian	China	3 March 2018	World Championships	Birmingham, United Kingdom	
100 m	10.41	Nobuharu Asahara	Japan	4 February 2002		Tampere, Finland	
200 m	20.63	Koji Ito	Japan	5 March 1999	World Championships	Maebashi, Japan	
300 m	33.67	Gennadiy Chernovol	Kazakhstan	7 January 2002		Yekaterinburg, Russia	
400 m	45.39	Abdalelah Haroun	Qatar	19 February 2015	XL Galan	Stockholm, Sweden	
500 m	59.83	Abdalelah Haroun	Qatar	17 February 2016	Globen Galan	Stockholm, Sweden	
600 m	1:15.47	Allon Clay	Japan	27 February 2026	Big Ten Conference Championships	Indianapolis, United States	
800 m	1:45.17	Allon Clay	Japan	30 January 2026	Penn State National Open	State College, United States	
1000 m	2:17.06	Belal Mansoor Ali	Bahrain	24 February 2008	Indoor Flanders Meeting	Ghent, Belgium	
1500 m	3:36.28	Belal Mansoor Ali	Bahrain	20 February 2007	GE Galan	Stockholm, Sweden	
Mile	3:54.72	Kieran Tuntivate	Thailand	14 February 2025	Boston University David Hemery Valentine Invitational	Boston, United States	
2000 m	5:00.34	Birhanu Balew	Bahrain	10 February 2019	Meeting Pas de Calais	Liévin, France	
3000 m	7:31.77	Birhanu Balew	Bahrain	17 February 2022	Meeting Hauts-de-France Pas-de-Calais	Liévin, France	
Two miles	8:14.71	Keita Satoh	Japan	11 February 2024	Millrose Games	New York City, United States	
5000 m	12:59.77	Gulveer Singh	India	22 February 2025	BU Terrier DMR Challenge	Boston, United States	
Marathon	3:13:19	Lokesh Kumar Meena	India	24 June 2018	Grant-Pierce Indoor Marathon	Arlington, United States	
50 m hurdles	6.50	Li Tong	China	19 February 1994		Los Angeles, United States	
50 m hurdles	6.44+	Liu Xiang	China	28 February 2004	Meeting Pas de Calais	Liévin, France	
55 m hurdles	7.08	Li Tong	China	8 March 1991	NCAA Division I Championships	Indianapolis, United States	
60 m hurdles	7.41	Liu Xiang	China	18 February 2012	Aviva Indoor Grand Prix	Birmingham, United Kingdom	
High jump	2.41 m	Mutaz Essa Barshim	Qatar	18 February 2015	Athlone IT International Grand Prix	Athlone, Ireland	
Pole vault	5.93 m	EJ Obiena	Philippines	23 February 2024	ISTAF Indoor	Berlin, Germany	
Long jump	8.27 m	Su Xiongfeng	China	11 March 2010	Nanjing Indoor Meeting	Nanjing, China	
Triple jump	17.41 m	Dong Bin	China	29 February 2016	National Grand Prix	Nanjing, China	
Shot put	21.10 m	Abdelrahman Mahmoud	Bahrain	29 January 2021	Belarusian Cup	Gomel, Belarus	
Weight throw	21.89 m	Khalil Bedioui	Qatar	18 February 2022	Virginia Tech Challenge	Blacksburg, United States	
Heptathlon	6229 pts	Dmitriy Karpov	Kazakhstan	15–16 February 2008		Tallinn, Estonia	
Heptathlon	60m / Long jump / Shot put / High jump / 60m H / Pole vault / 1000m; 7.07 / 7.21 m / 16.23 m / 2.07 m / 7.99 / 5.15 m / 2:43.69						
5000 m walk	19:14.00	Sergey Korepanov	Kazakhstan	28 January 1995		Karaganda, Kazakhstan	
4 × 200 m relay	1:26.70	Karaganda Team; Vitaliy Zems; Vladislav Grigoryev; Vyacheslav Zems; David Efremov	Kazakhstan	15 January 2018	Kazakhstani Championships	Oskemen, Kazakhstan	
4 × 400 m relay	3:05.90	Kazuhiro Takahashi; Jun Osakada; Masayoshi Kan; Shunji Karube	Japan	6 March 1999	World Championships	Maebashi, Japan	
4 × 800 m relay	8:48.6 h #	Syougawa Susumu; Syougawa; Katsumi Nakao; Syunzi Kawasaki	Japan	19 March 1961		Tokyo, Japan	

=== Women ===
Event	Record	Athlete	Nationality	Date	Meet	Place	Ref.
50 m	6.31+	Susanthika Jayasinghe	Sri Lanka	25 February 2001	Meeting Pas de Calais	Liévin, France	
60 m	7.09	Susanthika Jayasinghe	Sri Lanka	7 February 1999	Sparkassen Cup	Stuttgart, Germany	
200 m	22.99	Susanthika Jayasinghe	Sri Lanka	9 March 2001	World Championships	Lisbon, Portugal	
400 m	51.45	Kemi Adekoya	Bahrain	19 March 2016	World Championships	Portland, United States	
500 m	1:10.35	Oksana Luneva	Kyrgyzstan	7 January 2006		Yekaterinburg, Russia	
600 m	1:30.33	Lauren Hoffman (Note: USA until 30 September 2023; eligible to represent PHI from 1 October 2023)	Philippines	19 January 2024	Hokie Invitational	Blacksburg, United States	
800 m	2:00.78	Miho Sugimori	Japan	22 February 2003		Yokohama, Japan	
1000 m	2:46.6 h	Geng Xiujuan	China	27 March 1987		Beijing, China	
1500 m	3:59.79	Maryam Yusuf Jamal	Bahrain	9 March 2008	World Championships	Valencia, Spain	
Mile	4:24.71	Maryam Yusuf Jamal	Bahrain	20 February 2010	Aviva Indoor Grand Prix	Birmingham, United Kingdom	
2000 m	5:55.6 h	Liu Jianying	China	18 March 1994		Beijing, China	
3000 m	8:36.03	Nozomi Tanaka	Japan	2 March 2024	World Championships	Glasgow, United Kingdom	
Two miles	9:16.76	Nozomi Tanaka	Japan	11 February 2024	Millrose Games	New York City, United States	
5000 m	14:51.26	Nozomi Tanaka	Japan	15 February 2025	BU David Hemery Valentine Invitational	Boston, United States	
50 m hurdles	6.70	Olga Shishigina	Kazakhstan	5 February 1999		Budapest, Hungary	
55 m hurdles	7.59 A	Chan Sau Ying	Hong Kong	26 February 1994		Flagstaff, United States	
60 m hurdles	7.82	Olga Shishigina	Kazakhstan	21 February 1999	Meeting Pas de Calais	Liévin, France	
2000m steeplechase	5:45.09	Winfred Yavi	Bahrain	9 February 2021	Meeting Hauts-de-France Pas-de-Calais	Liévin, France	
High jump	1.98 m	Svetlana Zalevskaya	Kazakhstan	2 March 1996		Samara, Russia	
High jump	1.98 m	Nadezhda Dubovitskaya	Kazakhstan	19 March 2022	World Championships	Belgrade, Serbia	
Pole vault	4.70 m	Li Ling	China	19 February 2016	Asian Championships	Doha, Qatar	
Long jump	6.82 m	Yang Juan	China	13 March 1992		Beijing, China	
Long jump	6.96 m	Wang Yanping	China	4 February 2017	Azerbaijani Championships	Baku, Azerbaijan	
Triple jump	15.14 m	Olga Rypakova	Kazakhstan	13 March 2010	World Championships	Doha, Qatar	
Shot put	21.10 m	Sui Xinmei	China	3 March 1990		Beijing, China	
Weight throw	19.52 m	Shiloh Corrales-Nelson	Philippines	17 February 2024	Alex Wilson Invitational	Notre Dame, United States	
Discus throw	60.68 m	Chen Yang	China	27 March 2020		Beijing, China	
Hammer throw	69.44 m	Luo Na	China	30 May 2020		Beijing, China	
Javelin throw	64.34 m	Lü Huihui	China	29 May 2020		Beijing, China	
Pentathlon	4582 pts	Olga Rypakova	Kazakhstan	10 February 2006	Asian Championships	Pattaya, Thailand	
Pentathlon	60m H / High jump / Shot put / Long jump / 800m; 8.68 / 1.88 m / 12.90 m / 6.55 m / 2:23.26						
3000 m walk	12:42.65	Yuko Sato	Japan	11 February 1994		Osaka, Japan	
5000 m walk	24:22.41	Yasmina Toksanbayeva	Kazakhstan	17 February 2022		Oskemen, Kazakhstan	
4 × 200 m relay	1:36.40	Anastasiya Tulapina; Yuliya Rakhmanova; Aygerim Shynyzbekova; Viktoriya Zyabkina	Kazakhstan	11 February 2017	Kazakh Indoor Championships	Oskemen, Kazakhstan	
4 × 400 m relay	3:35.07	Salwa Eid Naser; Aminat Yusuf Jamal; Iman Essa Jasim; Kemi Adekoya	Bahrain	21 February 2016	Asian Championships	Doha, Qatar	
