= 2026 in the sport of athletics =

In 2026, multiple world records were set in the sport of athletics.

== World records ==
=== Indoor ===
Event	Perf.	N	R.	Athlete(s)	Nat.	Date	Meeting	Location	Ctry.	R
Men's 800 m sh	1:42.50 min		R	Josh Hoey	USA	24 Jan 2026	New Balance Grand Prix	Boston	USA	
Men's 4 × 800 m sh	7:10.29 min		R	Clay Pender; Luke Houser; Luciano Fiore; Sean Dolan	USA	6 Feb 2026	Penn Classic	Philadelphia	USA	
Men's 400 m sh	44.52 s		R	Khaleb McRae	USA	13 Feb 2026	Tyson Invitational	Fayetteville	USA	
Women's 800 m sh	1:54.87 min			Keely Hodgkinson	GBR	19 Feb 2026	Meeting Hauts-de-France Pas-de-Calais	Liévin	FRA	
Men's 5000 m race walk sh	17:54.48 min			Francesco Fortunato	ITA	28 Feb 2026	Italian Championships	Ancona	ITA	
Men's pole vault	6.31 m		R	Armand Duplantis	SWE	12 Mar 2026	Mondo Classic	Uppsala	SWE	
Men's heptathlon sh	6670 pts		R	Simon Ehammer	SUI	20-21 Mar 2026	World Indoor Championships	Toruń	POL	
Women's 60 m hurdles sh	7.65 s		R	Devynne Charlton	BAH	22 Mar 2026	World Indoor Championships	Toruń	POL	

=== Outdoor ===
Event	Perf.	N	R.	Athlete(s)	Nat.	Date	Meeting	Location	Ctry.	R
Men's half marathon race walk	1:20:34 h		R	Toshikazu Yamanishi	JPN	15 Feb 2026	Japanese Half Marathon Race Walking Championships	Kobe	JPN	
Men's half marathon	57:20 min		R	Jacob Kiplimo	UGA	8 Mar 2026	Lisbon Half Marathon	Lisbon	POR	
Men's marathon	1:59:30 h		R	Sebastian Sawe	KEN	26 Apr 2026	London Marathon	London	GBR	
Women's marathon	2:15:41 h	Wo	R	Tigst Assefa	ETH	26 Apr 2026	London Marathon	London	GBR	
Mixed 4 × 100 m	40.07 s	Mx		Eliezer Adjibi; Marie-Éloïse Leclair; Duan Asemota; Audrey Leduc	CAN	2 May 2026	World Relays	Gaborone	BOT	
Mixed 4 × 100 m	39.99 s	Mx		Ackeem Blake; Tina Clayton; Kadrian Goldson; Tia Clayton	JAM	2 May 2026	World Relays	Gaborone	BOT	
Mixed 4 × 100 m	39.62 s	Mx		Ackeem Blake; Tina Clayton; Kadrian Goldson; Tia Clayton	JAM	3 May 2026	World Relays	Gaborone	BOT	
Men's 110 m hurdles	12.75 s		R	Ja'Kobe Tharp	USA	10 Jun 2026	NCAA DI Men's Outdoor Championships	Eugene	USA	
Men's 1000 m	2:11.83 min		R	Emmanuel Wanyonyi	KEN	10 Jul 2026	Herculis	Monaco	MON	
Men's mile	3:42.66 min		R	Josh Kerr	GBR	18 Jul 2026	London Athletics Meet	London	GBR	
Women's half marathon race walk	1:30:06 h			María Pérez	ESP	15 Aug 2026	European Championships	Birmingham	GBR	
Women's marathon race walk	3:15:11 h			Sofia Fiorini	ITA	15 Aug 2026	European Championships	Birmingham	GBR	
Men's half marathon	56:51 min		R	Yomif Kejelcha	ETH	23 Aug 2026	Media Maratón Ciudad de Buenos Aires	Buenos Aires	ARG	
Women's 100 m hurdles	12.09 s		R	Masai Russell	USA	27 Aug 2026	Weltklasse Zürich	Zürich	SUI	
Men's 400 m hurdles	45.80 s		R	Alison dos Santos	BRA	27 Aug 2026	Weltklasse Zürich	Zürich	SUI	
Women's half marathon	1:05:15 h	Wo		Agnes Ngetich	KEN	20 Sep 2026	World Road Running Championships	Copenhagen	DEN	
Men's marathon race walk	2:55:14 h			Masatora Kawano	JPN	25 October 2026	All Japan Race Walking	Takahata	JPN	
Women's marathon race walk	3:14:52 h			Rebecca Henderson	AUS	25 October 2026	All Japan Race Walking	Takahata	JPN	

== Competitions ==
=== Global ===
- 2026 World Athletics Indoor Tour (13 December 2025 – 12 March 2026)
- 2026 World Athletics Cross Country Championships (10 January 2026)
- 2026 World Athletics Continental Tour (17 January – 1 November 2026)
- 2026 World Athletics Indoor Championships (20–22 March 2026)
- 2026 World Athletics Race Walking Team Championships (12 April 2026)
- 2026 World Athletics Relays (2–3 May 2026)
- 2026 Diamond League (16 May – 5 September 2026)
- 2026 World Athletics Ultimate Championship (11–13 September 2026)

=== Regional ===
- Athletics at the 2026 Commonwealth Games (27 July − 1 August 2026)
- 2026 European Athletics Championships (10–16 August 2026)
