= Athletics at the 2018 Asian Games – Men's 20 kilometres walk =

In 2018, Asian Games took place at the Gelora Bung Karno Stadium

Men's 20 kilometres walk at the 2018 Asian Games
- Venue: Gelora Bung Karno Stadium
- Date: 29 August 2018
- Competitors: 11 from 7 nations

Medalists
gold medal	Wang Kaihua	China
silver medal	Toshikazu Yamanishi	Japan
bronze medal	Jin Xiangqian	China

The men's 20 kilometres walk competition at the 2018 Asian Games took place on 29 August 2018 at the Gelora Bung Karno Stadium.

== Schedule ==
All times are Western Indonesia Time (UTC+07:00)

Date	Time	Event
Wednesday, 29 August 2018	06:00	Final

== Records ==
Prior to this competition, the existing world, Asian and Games records were as follows.

World Record	Yusuke Suzuki (JPN)	1:16:36	Nomi, Japan	15 March 2015
Asian Record	Yusuke Suzuki (JPN)	1:16:36	Nomi, Japan	15 March 2015
Games Record	Wang Zhen (CHN)	1:19:45	Incheon, South Korea	28 September 2014

== Results ==
Legend

- DSQ — Disqualified

Rank	Athlete	Time	Notes
1st place, gold medalist(s)	Wang Kaihua (CHN)	1:22:04	
2nd place, silver medalist(s)	Toshikazu Yamanishi (JPN)	1:22:10	
3rd place, bronze medalist(s)	Jin Xiangqian (CHN)	1:25:41	
4	Kim Hyun-sub (KOR)	1:27:17	
5	Eiki Takahashi (JPN)	1:27:31	
6	Georgiy Sheiko (KAZ)	1:27:58	
7	Choe Byeong-kwang (KOR)	1:29:49	
8	Bayu Prasetyo (INA)	1:42:35	
9	Chin Man Kit (HKG)	1:43:43	
—	K. T. Irfan (IND)	DSQ	
—	Manish Singh Rawat (IND)	DSQ	
