= Keita Satoh =

Keita Satoh may refer to:

- Keita Satoh (curler)
- Keita Satoh (runner)
