= Half marathon race walk =

Racewalking event in athletics

Athletics Half marathon race walk
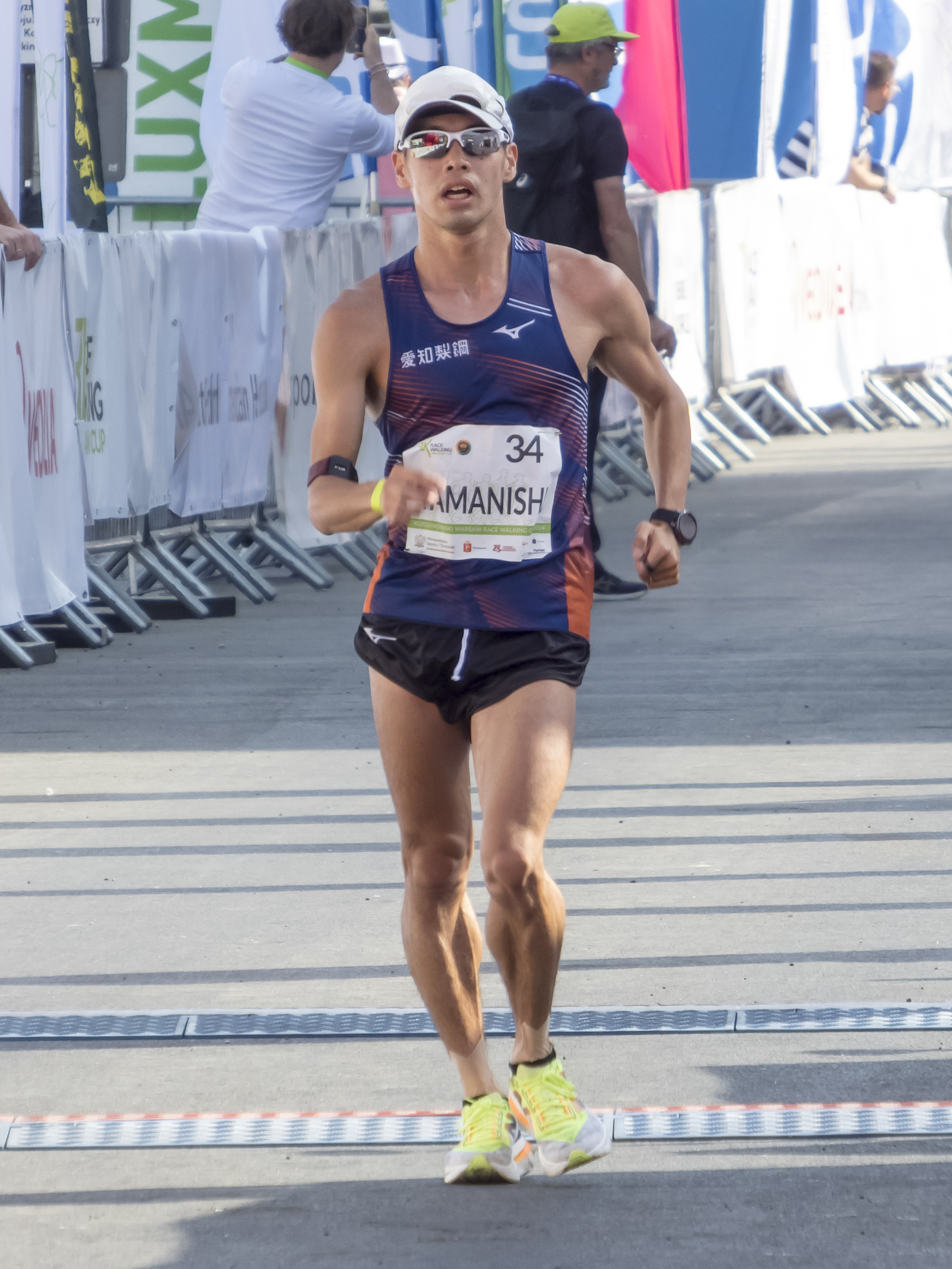
- Men's record-holder Toshikazu Yamanishi in 2024

World records
- Men: Toshikazu Yamanishi (JPN) 1:20:34 (2026)
- Women: Jiang Yunyan (CHN) 1:31:39 (2026)

The half marathon race walk is a road racewalking event over the half marathon distance (21.0975 km). It will be contested in lieu of the 20 km walk at the 2028 Summer Olympics.

== History ==
The event was first announced by World Athletics in December 2024 to replace the 20 kilometres race walk. It was the second non-metric race walk distance to be contested in athletics at the Summer Olympics, following the marathon race walk mixed relay first contested in 2024. The first international championship in the event was held at the 2026 World Athletics Race Walking Team Championships.

== Area records ==
- Updated 3 November 2026.

Area	Men			Women		
Area	Time	Season	Athlete	Time	Season	Athlete
World	1:20:34	2026	Toshikazu Yamanishi (JPN)	1:30:06	2026	María Pérez (ESP)
Area records
Africa (records)
Asia (records)
Europe (records)	1:23:00	2026	Francesco Fortunato (ITA)	1:30:06	2026	María Pérez (ESP)
North, Central America and Caribbean (records)	1:24:59	2026	Ricardo Ortiz (MEX)	1:32:15	2026	Alegna González (MEX)
Oceania (records)
South America (records)	1:21:44	2026	Caio Bonfim (BRA)	1:31:44	2026	Kimberly García (PER)

== See also ==
- 20 kilometres race walk
- Marathon race walk
