= Jin Xiangqian =

Chinese racewalker (born 1997)

Personal information
- Born: 18 March 1997 (age 29)

Sport
- Country: China
- Sport: Racewalking
Medal record
Men's racewalking
Representing China
Asian Games
Bronze medal – third place	2018 Jakarta	20 km walk

Jin Xiangqian (born 18 March 1997) is a Chinese racewalker. He won the bronze medal in the men's 20 kilometres walk at the 2018 Asian Games held in Jakarta, Indonesia.

In 2017, he competed in the men's 20 kilometres walk at the 2017 World Championships in Athletics held in London, United Kingdom. He finished in 19th place.
