= Takayuki Matsumiya =

Japanese long-distance runner (born 1980)

Takayuki Matsumiya (Japanese: 松宮隆行; born 21 February 1980 in Akita) is a Japanese long-distance runner who specializes in marathon races. He holds the Asian record and Japanese record over 25 km and 30 km. He has a twin brother, Yuko, who is also a top-level marathon runner.

He made his debut over the marathon distance at the Nobeoka Marathon, which he finished in a time of 2:18:48. He also made his global championship debut that year, competing at the 2001 IAAF World Half Marathon Championships and taking 53rd place overall. He was eleventh at the 2005 World Half Marathon Championships, which was good enough to help Japan finish third in the team competition. He won the Kagawa Marugame Half Marathon in 2006, breaking a run of wins by Kenyan runners. He improved his marathon best at the Lake Biwa Marathon the month after, taking second place to José Ríos with a run of 2:10:20.

In February 2007 he broke the 30 kilometres road running world record in Kumamoto. The time was 1:28:00 hours – a mark which stood for over two years, eventually being beaten by Haile Gebrselassie in September 2009, en route to his marathon world record run in Berlin. Matsumiya competed at the 2007 Rotterdam Marathon and was pleased despite being defeated by Joshua Chelanga as the Japanese set a personal best of 2:10:04 to finish in the runner-up spot. He represented Japan in the 5000 metres at the 2007 World Championships in Athletics but did not manage to progress into the event final. He made his Olympic debut at the 2008 Beijing Olympics and ran in both the 5000 m and 10,000 metres. He was knocked out in the qualifiers over the shorter distance and placed 31st in the 10,000 m.

He aimed to qualify for the marathon at the 2011 World Championships in Athletics in Daegu. He missed the necessary time at a hot Fukuoka Marathon, but his run of 2:10:54 still got him third place on the podium. He returned to the marathon distance in 2012 and ran a personal best of 2:09:28 hours to claim seventh place at the Tokyo Marathon.

== Personal bests ==
- 3000 metres - 7:53.52 min (2003)
- 5000 metres - 13:13.20 min (2007)
- 10,000 metres - 27:41.75 min (2008)
- Half marathon - 1:01:32 hrs (2005)
- 30 kilometres - 1:28:00 (former world record) (2005)
- Marathon - 2:09:28 hrs (2012)
