= Eiki Takahashi =

Japanese racewalker

Personal information
- Born: 19 November 1992 (age 33)

Sport
- Country: Japan
- Sport: Track and field
- Event: racewalking
- Updated on 29 August 2015

Eiki Takahashi (高橋 英輝, Takahashi Eiki; born 19 November 1992) is a male Japanese racewalker. He competed in the 20 kilometres walk event at the 2015 World Championships in Athletics in Beijing, China. On 13 December 2015, he set the Asian record for the 10,000m race walk on a track. In 2016, he was the #1 ranked walker in the world for 20 km. As a result of his fast time in February, he was considered Japan's next great walking hope, replacing teammate world record holder Yusuke Suzuki. He walked in the 2016 Olympics where he walked with the lead (chase) pack until almost 14 km when eventual winner Cai Zelin broke the race open. Takahashi eventually finished 42nd.

== See also ==
- Japan at the 2015 World Championships in Athletics
