= 20,000 metres =

Long distance running event

The 20,000 metres (approximately 12.43 mi or 65,617 ft) is a rarely contested long-distance running event in track and field competitions; most world records in the event have been set during half marathons and one-hour races, as a half marathon is roughly 21,000 meters.

== World records ==
+ = indicates a time was taken at an intermediate distance in a longer race

=== Men ===
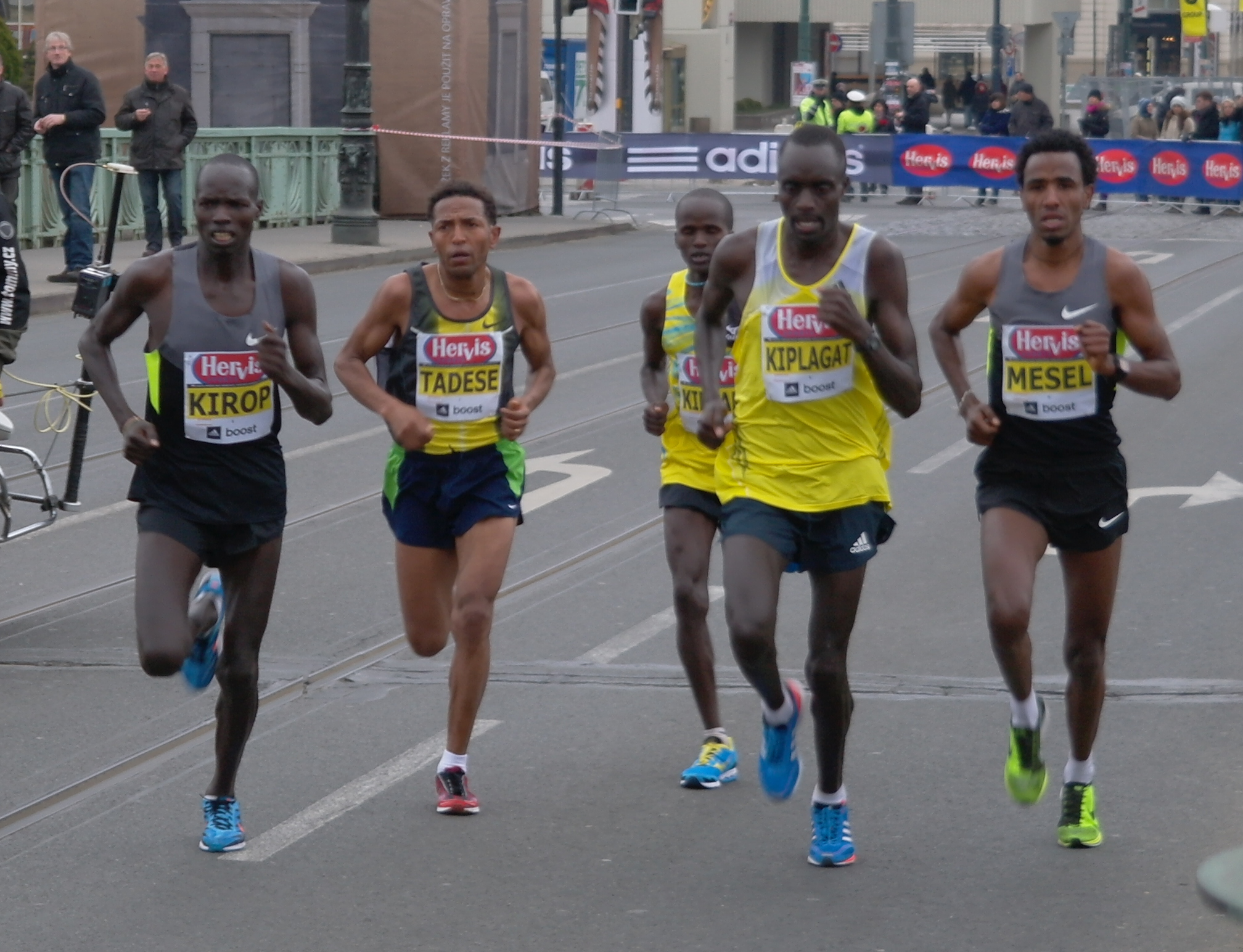
- Zersenay Tadese in the lead pack of the 2013 Prague Half Marathon
  Updated January 2024.

Event	Result	Athlete	Nation	Date	Place	Meeting	Ref.
20,000 m (track)	56:20.02+	Bashir Abdi	Belgium	4 September 2020	Brussels	Memorial Van Damme	
20 km (road)	54:29+	Jacob Kiplimo	Uganda	21 Nov 2021	Lisbon	Lisbon Half Marathon	

=== Women ===
- Correct as of January 2024.

Event	Result	Athlete	Nation	Date	Place	Meeting	Ref.
20,000 m (track)	1:05:26.6	Tegla Loroupe	Kenya	3 Sep 2000	Borgholzhausen		
20 km (road)	59:35+	Letesenbet Gidey	Ethiopia	24 Oct 2021	Valencia	Valencia Half Marathon	

== All-time top 25 ==
- + = en route to longer performance
- h = hand timed

=== Men ===
- Updated September 2022.

Rank	Result (m)	Athlete	Nation	Date	Place	Ref.
1	56:20.02+	Bashir Abdi	Belgium	4 September 2020	Brussels	
2	56:20.30+	Mo Farah	Great Britain	4 September 2020	Brussels	
3	56:20.55+	Sabastian Sawe	Kenya	2 September 2022	Brussels	
4	56:26.0+	Haile Gebrselassie	Ethiopia	27 June 2007	Ostrava	
5	56:51.60+	Sondre Nordstad Moen	Norway	7 August 2020	Kristiansand	
6	56:55.6+ h	Arturo Barrios	Mexico	30 March 1991	La Fléche	
7	57:07.41+	Kibiwott Kandie	Kenya	2 September 2022	Brussels	
8	57:18.4+ h	Dionisio Castro	Portugal	31 March 1990	La Flèche	
9	57:24.2+	Jos Hermens	Netherlands	1 May 1976	Arnhem	
10	57:28.7+ h	Carl Thackery	Great Britain	31 March 1990	La Flèche	
11	57:44.4+ h	Gaston Roelants	Belgium	20 September 1972	Brussels	
12	57:48.7	Toshihiko Seko	Japan	11 May 1985	Odawara	
13	57:50.25+	Morhad Amdouni	France	19 September 2020	Lucciana	
14	58:17.3+	Daniel Mateo	Spain	20 April 2021	La Nucía	
15	58:18.4+	Bertrand Itsweire	France	31 March 1990	La Flèche	
16	58:25.0	Bill Rodgers	United States	9 August 1977	Boston	
17	58:30.2+	Werner Schildhauer	Germany	29 April 1983	Cottbus	
18	58:37.2+ h	Rob de Castella	Australia	17 April 1982	Rome	
19	58:37.8+ h	Mariano Haro	Spain	9 August 1975	San Sebastián	
20	58:53.6+	Girmaw Amare	Israel	26 January 2020	Tel Aviv	
21	58:43.8 h	Franco Fava	Italy	9 April 1977	Rome	
22	59:02.0 h	Rashid Sharafetdinov	Soviet Union	2 May 1971	Leningrad	
23	59:14.02	Stéphane Schweickhardt	Switzerland	15 April 1998	Martigny	
24	59:19.0	András Fancsali	Hungary	15 April 1978	Budapest	
25	59:24.8+	Leszek Bebło	Poland	31 March 1990	La Flèche	

==== Notes ====
Below is a list of all other times equal or superior to 57:55.00:

- Sondre Nordstad Moen also ran 57:55.0+ h (2020).

=== Women ===
- Updated September 2022.

Rank	Result	Athlete	Nation	Date	Place	Ref.
1	1:05:26.6	Tegla Loroupe	Kenya	3 September 2000	Borgholzhausen	
2	1:05:35.3	Dire Tune	Ethiopia	17 June 2009	Ostrava	
3	1:06:48.8	Izumi Maki	Japan	19 September 1993	Amagasaki	
4	1:06:55.5	Rosa Mota	Portugal	14 May 1983	Lisbon	
5	1:07:19.9	Naomi Sakashita	Japan	10 October 1995	Amagasaki	
6	1:07:47.0	Kaori Kumura	Japan	19 September 1993	Amagasaki	
7	1:07:49.9	Rika Ota	Japan	17 June 1992	Akashi	
8	1:07:52.0	Midori Shimizu	Japan	1 October 1994	Amagasaki	
9	1:08:07.6	Megumi Fujiwara	Japan	17 June 1992	Akashi	
10	1:08:46.6	Takako Kobayashi	Japan	1 October 1994	Amagasaki	
11	1:08:51.9	Junko Asari	Japan	17 June 1992	Akashi	
12	1:08:52.6	Nanae Sasaki	Japan	29 May 1984	Tokyo	
13	1:08:59.2	Aki Yasaki	Japan	17 June 1992	Akashi	
14	1:09:19.1	Chiyuki Ona	Japan	17 June 1992	Akashi	
15	1:09:53.0	Blandine Bitzner	France	13 May 2000	La Celle-Saint-Cloud	
16	1:10:30.4+	Helena Javornik	Slovenia	19 July 2006	Maribor	
17	1:10:35.0	Leah Malot	Kenya	17 June 2009	Ostrava	
18	1:10:50.2	Christa Vahlensieck	West Germany	25 October 1975	Essen	
19	1:10:56.6	Ágnes Özéné Sipka	Hungary	16 October 1988	Székesfehérvár	
20	1:11:00.0	Miki Kitajima	Japan	20 September 1993	Amagasaki	
21	1:11:05.0+	Judit Nagy	Hungary	22 October 1989	Székesfehérvár	
22	1:11:17.6	Chiara Mainetti	Argentina	18 June 2022	Buenos Aires	
23	1:11:48.9+	Karolina Szabo	Hungary	23 April 1988	Budapest	
24	1:12:44	Maria Luisa Irizar	Spain	23 June 1985	Laredo	
25						

== In popular culture ==
Tegla Loroupe's 20,000 meter world record was mentioned in Chapter 1, problem 64P of Chemistry (Seventh Edition) by John E. McMurry, Robert C. Fay, and Jill Kirsten Robinson.
