= Keita Satoh (runner) =

Japanese long-distance runner

Personal information
- Born: 22 January 2004 (age 22) Kyoto, Japan
- Height: 1.84 m (6 ft 0 in)
- Weight: 67 kg (148 lb)

Sport
- Sport: Athletics
- Event: 3000 metres – 10,000 metres
Medal record
Representing Japan
Asian Indoor Athletics Championships
Silver medal – second place	2023 Astana	3000 metres

Keita Satoh (佐藤 圭汰, Satō Keita, born 22 January 2004) is a Japanese long-distance runner. He won a silver medal in the 3000 metres at the 2023 Asian Indoor Athletics Championships. He also set the Asian record for the indoor two miles at the Millrose Games in February 2024, running 8:14.71.

== Personal bests ==
- 1500 metres – 3:37.18 (Chitose 2021)
- 3000 metres – 7:42.56i (Boston 2024) NR
- Two miles – 8:14.71i (New York 2024) ABP
- 5000 metres – 13:09.45i (Boston 2024) NR
- 10,000 metres – 27:28.50 (Konosu 2017) AU20R
