= Honami Maeda =

Japanese long-distance runner

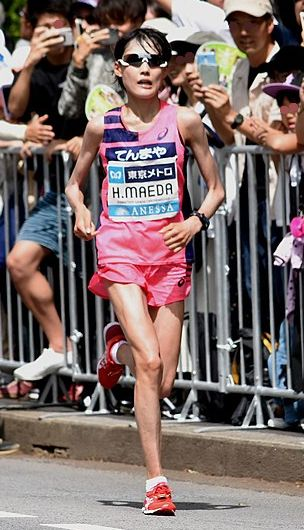
- Maeda in 2019 Japan's Marathon Grand Championship

Personal information
- Native name: 前田 穂南
- Nickname: Honan
- Born: 17 July 1996 (age 30) Amagasaki, Hyogo Prefecture
- Education: Higashinaka Sonoda (Hyogo); Kaoruide Osaka High School (Osaka)
- Height: 1.66 m (5 ft 5 in)
- Weight: 46 kg (101 lb)

Sport
- Country: Japan
- Sport: Track and field
- Events: 10,000 metres, Marathon
- College team: Osaka Kaoruide Jogakuin High School
- Club: Tenmaya (天満屋)
- Team: Asics

Achievements and titles
- Personal bests: 5000 m: 15:38:16; 10,000 m: 32:13:87; Half marathon: 69:12 (2018 Sanyo Women's Half Marathon); 30 km : 1:38:35 AR; Marathon: 2:18:59 NR (2024 Osaka International Ladies Marathon)

Honami Maeda (前田 穂南, Maeda Honami; born 17 July 1996) is a Japanese long-distance runner. She is the holder of the Japanese national record for 30 km (1:38:35), and the marathon (2:18:59), and the winner of the 2017 Hokkaido Marathon and the 2019 Marathon Grand Championship. She represented Japan at the 2020 Tokyo Olympics.

Maeda won her first marathon in 2017 (Hokkaido Marathon in 2:28:48). She was second in the 2018 Osaka International Women's Marathon, and in the same year won the Sanyo Women's Half Marathon in 1:09:12. In 2020 Maeda won the Japanese Olympic Marathon trials in 2:25:15, beating second placed Ayuko Suzuki and third placed Rei Ohara.

On 10 March 2024, Maeda was selected to represent Japan in the women's marathon at the 2024 Paris Olympics. On 9 August, the day before the race, she announced that she would be forced to withdraw from competition due to a stress fracture in her right femur.

== Marathons ==
Key: Personal best

Year	Competition	Venue	Position	Event	Notes
Representing Japan
2017	Osaka Women's Marathon	Osaka, Japan	12th	Marathon	2:32:19
2017	Hokkaido Marathon	Hokkaido, Japan	1st	Marathon	2:28:48
2018	Osaka Women's Marathon	Osaka, Japan	2nd	Marathon	2:23:48
2018	Berlin Marathon	Berlin, Germany	7th	Marathon	2:25:23
2019	Tokyo Marathon	Tokyo, Japan	12th	Marathon	2:31:42
2020	Marathon Grand Championship	Tokyo, Japan	1st	Marathon	2:25:15
2021	Osaka Women's Marathon	Osaka, Japan	2nd	Marathon	2:23:30
2021	Olympic Games	Sapporo, Japan	33rd	Marathon	2:35:28
2023	Nagoya Women's Marathon	Nagoya, Japan	3rd	Marathon	2:22:32
2023	Marathon Grand Championship	Tokyo, Japan	7th	Marathon	2:27:02
2024	Osaka Women's Marathon	Osaka, Japan	2nd	Marathon	2:18:59 (NR)
2024	Olympic Games	Paris, France	DNS	Marathon	
