= 2024 Millrose Games =

Indoor athletics meeting in New York City

- Dates: 11 February 2024
- Host city: New York City, New York, United States
- Venue: Fort Washington Avenue Armory
- Level: 2024 World Athletics Indoor Tour

The 2024 Millrose Games was the 116th edition of the annual indoor track and field meeting in New York City. Held on 11 February at the Fort Washington Armory in Upper Manhattan, it was the sixth leg of the 2024 World Athletics Indoor Tour Gold series – the highest-level international indoor track and field circuit.

== Highlights ==
A world record and a world best were set at the meeting. First, Devynne Charlton broke Susanna Kallur's women's 60 metres hurdles world record by 0.01 seconds with a time of 7.67. This performance was not expected, as Charlton had only finished third at the 2024 New Balance Indoor Grand Prix one week prior.

The world best occurred in the short track men's two miles, where Josh Kerr broke Mo Farah's previous world best with an 8:00.67 clocking. He was led through the mile in 4:03, and stayed behind Grant Fisher until the final stages. Behind him, Fisher set an American best at the distance and various other national records were achieved in the same race.

In the women's two miles, Medina Eisa originally crossed the line first, but she was disqualified for cutting in her lane during the staggered start, so her total distance ran was less than two miles.

== Results ==
=== World Athletics Indoor Tour ===
Men's 60m
Place	Athlete	Country	Time	Points
1st place, gold medalist(s)	Christian Coleman	United States	6.51	10
2nd place, silver medalist(s)	Abdul Hakim Sani Brown	Japan	6.54	7
3rd place, bronze medalist(s)	Ackeem Blake	Jamaica	6.55	5
4	Ryiem Forde	Jamaica	6.60	3
5	J.T. Smith	United States	6.60	
6	Shakur Williams	Jamaica	6.61	
7	Demek Kemp	United States	6.61	
8	Andre De Grasse	Canada	6.62	
9	Miles Lewis	Puerto Rico	6.66	

Men's 800m
Place	Athlete	Country	Time	Points
1st place, gold medalist(s)	Bryce Hoppel	United States	1:45.54	10
2nd place, silver medalist(s)	Noah Kibet	Kenya	1:46.09	7
3rd place, bronze medalist(s)	Mark English	Ireland	1:46.61	5
4	Luciano Fiore	United States	1:46.73	3
5	Luis Peralta	Dominican Republic	1:46.74	
6	Sam Ellis	United States	1:47.44	
	CJ Jones	United States	DNF	

Men's 2 Miles
Place	Athlete	Country	Time	Points
1st place, gold medalist(s)	Josh Kerr	Great Britain	8:00.67 WB	10
2nd place, silver medalist(s)	Grant Fisher	United States	8:03.62	7
3rd place, bronze medalist(s)	Cole Hocker	United States	8:05.70	5
4	Geordie Beamish	New Zealand	8:05.73	3
5	Morgan McDonald	Australia	8:12.01	
6	Kieran Lumb	Canada	8:14.52	
7	Keita Satoh	Japan	8:14.71	
8	Samuel Firewu	Ethiopia	8:15.69	
9	Joe Klecker	United States	8:20.57	
	AJ Ernst	United States	DNF	
	Hazem Miawad	Egypt	DNF	

Men's Pole Vault
Place	Athlete	Country	Mark	Points
1st place, gold medalist(s)	Chris Nilsen	United States	5.82 m	10
2nd place, silver medalist(s)	KC Lightfoot	United States	5.82 m	7
3rd place, bronze medalist(s)	Austin Miller	United States	5.75 m	5
4	Zach Bradford	United States	5.75 m	3
5	Zach McWhorter	United States	5.50 m	
6	Matt Ludwig	United States	5.35 m	

Women's 300m
Place	Athlete	Country	Time	Points
1st place, gold medalist(s)	Talitha Diggs	United States	36.21	10
2nd place, silver medalist(s)	Rhasidat Adeleke	Ireland	36.42	7
3rd place, bronze medalist(s)	Leah Anderson	Jamaica	37.40	5
4	Candice McLeod	Jamaica	38.01	3

Women's Mile
Place	Athlete	Country	Time	Points
1st place, gold medalist(s)	Elle Purrier St. Pierre	United States	4:16.41	10
2nd place, silver medalist(s)	Jessica Hull	Australia	4:19.03	7
3rd place, bronze medalist(s)	Susan Lokayo Ejore	Kenya	4:20.61	5
4	Yolanda Ngarambe	Sweden	4:23.68	3
5	Dani Jones	United States	4:23.80	
6	Marta Pérez	Spain	4:23.88	
7	Simone Plourde	Canada	4:24.67	
8	Maia Ramsden	New Zealand	4:24.83	
9	Lucia Stafford	Canada	4:24.92	
10	Josette Andrews	United States	4:25.86	
11	Anna Camp Bennett	United States	4:26.95	
	Sadi Henderson	United States	DNF	
	Helen Schlachtenhaufen	United States	DNF	

Women's 60mH
Place	Athlete	Country	Time	Points
1st place, gold medalist(s)	Devynne Charlton	Bahamas	7.67 WR	10
2nd place, silver medalist(s)	Danielle Williams	Jamaica	7.79	7
3rd place, bronze medalist(s)	Tia Jones	United States	7.79	5
4	Ackera Nugent	Jamaica	7.80	3
5	Cindy Sember	Great Britain	7.91	
6	Nia Ali	United States	7.95	
7	Megan Tapper	Jamaica	7.98	
8	Sharika Nelvis	United States	8.05	
9	Aleesa Samuel	United States	8.26	

Women's High Jump
Place	Athlete	Country	Mark	Points
1st place, gold medalist(s)	Yaroslava Mahuchikh	Ukraine	2.00 m	10
2nd place, silver medalist(s)	Vashti Cunningham	United States	1.97 m	7
3rd place, bronze medalist(s)	Nawal Meniker	France	1.86 m	5
4	Elisabeth Pihela	Estonia	1.86 m	3
	Kimberly Williamson	Jamaica	NM	

=== Indoor Meeting ===
Men's Mile
Place	Athlete	Country	Time
1st place, gold medalist(s)	Yared Nuguse	United States	3:47.83
2nd place, silver medalist(s)	Hobbs Kessler	United States	3:48.66
3rd place, bronze medalist(s)	George Mills	Great Britain	3:48.93
4	Adam Fogg	Great Britain	3:49.62
5	Casey Comber	United States	3:51.92
6	Adam Spencer	Australia	3:52.70
7	Charles Philibert-Thiboutot	Canada	3:53.12
8	Cooper Teare	United States	3:53.41
9	Liam Murphy	United States	3:53.96
10	Mario García	Spain	3:54.15
11	Sam Prakel	United States	3:55.09
12	Andrew Coscoran	Ireland	4:01.69
	Derek Holdsworth	United States	DNF

Men's 60mH
Place	Athlete	Country	Time
1st place, gold medalist(s)	Dylan Beard	United States	7.44
2nd place, silver medalist(s)	Daniel Roberts	United States	7.51
3rd place, bronze medalist(s)	Trey Cunningham	United States	7.52
4	Cordell Tinch	United States	7.52
5	Damion Thomas	Jamaica	7.64
6	Michael Dickson	United States	7.70
7	Orlando Bennett	Jamaica	7.76
8	Giano Roberts	Jamaica	7.80

Women's 60m
Place	Athlete	Country	Time
1st place, gold medalist(s)	Julien Alfred	Saint Lucia	6.99
2nd place, silver medalist(s)	Shashalee Forbes	Jamaica	7.14
3rd place, bronze medalist(s)	Destiny Smith-Barnett	United States	7.16
4	Briana Williams	Jamaica	7.25
5	Tamara Clark	United States	7.27
6	English Gardner	United States	7.27
7	Crystal Emmanuel	Canada	7.37
8	Shannon Ray	United States	7.38

Women's 800m
Place	Athlete	Country	Time
1st place, gold medalist(s)	Allie Wilson	United States	2:01.61
2nd place, silver medalist(s)	Olivia Baker	United States	2:01.91
3rd place, bronze medalist(s)	Lorena Martín	Spain	2:01.93
4	Kaela Edwards	United States	2:02.06
5	Gabija Galvydytė	Lithuania	2:02.24
6	Raevyn Rogers	United States	2:02.49
	Emily Richards	United States	DNF

Women's 2 Miles
Place	Athlete	Country	Time
1st place, gold medalist(s)	Laura Muir	Great Britain	9:04.84
2nd place, silver medalist(s)	Melknat Wudu	Ethiopia	9:07.12
3rd place, bronze medalist(s)	Alicia Monson	United States	9:09.70
4	Nikki Hiltz	United States	9:15.80
5	Nozomi Tanaka	Japan	9:16.76
6	Emily Mackay	United States	9:18.29
7	Emily Infeld	United States	9:23.58
8	Courtney Wayment	United States	9:24.71
9	Abby Nichols	United States	9:35.30
10	Alicja Konieczek	Poland	9:35.43
11	Roisin Flanagan	Ireland	9:36.70
12	Krissy Gear	United States	9:41.26
	Laurie Barton	United States	DNF
	Medina Eisa	Ethiopia	DQ

=== U12 Events ===
Women's 400m
Place	Athlete	Country	Time
1st place, gold medalist(s)	Abigail Robisky	United States	57.48
2nd place, silver medalist(s)	Anahia Joseph	United States	59.76
3rd place, bronze medalist(s)	Kelly McCabe	United States	61.31

=== USA Race Walking Ch. ===
Men's Mile Race Walk
Place	Athlete	Country	Time
1st place, gold medalist(s)	Nick Christie	United States	6:01.14
2nd place, silver medalist(s)	Jordan Crawford	United States	6:37.52
3rd place, bronze medalist(s)	Clayton Stoil	United States	6:42.77
4	Carson Johnson	United States	6:49.09
5	Richard Luettchau	United States	6:58.99
6	Colin Graham	United States	7:03.67
7	Dmitry Babenko	Canada	7:08.45

Women's Mile Race Walk
Place	Athlete	Country	Time
1st place, gold medalist(s)	Angelina Colon	United States	7:04.10
2nd place, silver medalist(s)	Ruby Ray	United States	7:05.63
3rd place, bronze medalist(s)	Ciara Durcan	United States	7:10.88
4	Madison Morgan	United States	7:14.26
5	Alexa Governor	United States	7:16.47
6	Marissa Sciotto	United States	7:37.26
7	Kyra Pellegrino	United States	7:39.02

=== National Events ===
Men's Weight Throw
Place	Athlete	Country	Mark
1st place, gold medalist(s)	Alex Kristeller	United States	21.36 m
2nd place, silver medalist(s)	Marcus Disbrow	United States	20.59 m
3rd place, bronze medalist(s)	Brian Luciano	United States	20.06 m
4	Evangelos Fradelakis	United States	18.92 m
5	Jaston Ormsby	United States	18.40 m
6	Chinedu Onye	United States	18.07 m
7	Robert Decker	United States	18.01 m
8	Parker Kim	United States	17.92 m
9	Liam Lovering	United States	16.70 m

Women's Weight Throw
Place	Athlete	Country	Mark
1st place, gold medalist(s)	Kyria Moore	United States	20.43 m
2nd place, silver medalist(s)	Stephanie Green	United States	19.33 m
3rd place, bronze medalist(s)	Alina Duran	United States	19.33 m
4	Margaret Hayden	Ireland	19.02 m
5	Mary Gill	United States	18.37 m
6	Kiana Nosile	Haiti	17.73 m
7	Kristin Stickdorn	Germany	16.45 m
8	Lailah Malone	United States	16.08 m
9	Alexandra Caraher	United States	16.00 m

Men's 4 × 200 m
Place	Athlete	Country	Time
1st place, gold medalist(s)	Rikkoi Brathwaite; Nadale Buntin; Jaelen Means; Alex Kainer	International team	1:26.24
2nd place, silver medalist(s)	Kimorie Shearman; Vincenzo Battaglia; Shervon Barthelmy; Jovanni Parkinson	International team	1:28.82

Men's 4 × 400 m
Place	Athlete	Country	Time
1st place, gold medalist(s)	Carl Drakes; Jarrett Gentles; Daniel Cunningham; Asa Francis	International team	3:17.18
2nd place, silver medalist(s)	Kevin Callaghan; Dakota Strain; Sam Freeman; Matthew Nurse	United States	3:19.71
3rd place, bronze medalist(s)	Chazz Alexander; Dwayne Fleming; Tinashe Bure; Mehdi Alim Guerrah	International team	3:19.92
4	Harrison Alonzo; Jaiden Bradshaw; Jay Glenn; Travis Delaney	United States	3:23.72

Men's Distance Medley
Place	Athlete	Country	Time
1st place, gold medalist(s)	John Lewis; Mike Columbus; Isaac Clarke; Billy Hill	United States	9:55.49

Women's 4 × 200 m
Place	Athlete	Country	Time
1st place, gold medalist(s)	Mariah Toussaint; Taylor Anderson; Gabrielle Farquharson; Divonne Franklin	International team	1:39.24
2nd place, silver medalist(s)	Gabriella Apelian; Gabby Buissereth; Anna Hoffman; Wahjerjay Blango	United States	1:44.77

Women's 4 × 400 m
Place	Athlete	Country	Time
1st place, gold medalist(s)	Nia Holden; Amarachukwu Jecinta OBI; Nora Haugen; Chinenye Onuorah	International team	3:45.72
2nd place, silver medalist(s)	Dillyn Green; Alexandra Williams; Michele Daye; Kyla Hill	United States	3:48.40
3rd place, bronze medalist(s)	Brinesha Derrick-Bain; Thalia Benoit; Tyler Howard; Jazmen Newberry	United States	3:49.19
4	Grace Burke; Hayley Lucido; Sanai Jenkins; Maddie Stevens	United States	3:49.78
5	Shaquka Tyrell; Attoya Harvey; Kayla Johnson; Quaycian Davis	International team	3:53.03

Women's Distance Medley
Place	Athlete	Country	Time
1st place, gold medalist(s)	Kassidy Johnson; Gabby Buissereth; Emily Rosario; Michelle Howell	United States	11:31.86
2nd place, silver medalist(s)	Laurel Fisher; Olga Kosichenko; Brittany Ogunmokun; Anna Jurew	International team	11:37.24
3rd place, bronze medalist(s)	Alana Levy; Zoe Wilki-Tomasik; Deirdre Martyn; Brooke Wildermuth	United States	11:37.78

=== U20 Events ===
Men's Pole Vault
Place	Athlete	Country	Mark
1st place, gold medalist(s)	Bryce Barkdull	United States	5.35 m
2nd place, silver medalist(s)	Dyson Wicker	United States	5.15 m
3rd place, bronze medalist(s)	Khaliq Muhammad	United States	4.95 m
4	Luke Beattie	United States	4.95 m
5	Neil Howard	United States	4.95 m
6	Julian Lynch	United States	4.45 m
7	Zachary Davidson	United States	4.45 m
8	Logan Schupner	United States	4.45 m
	Luther Mogelvang	United States	NM

Men's 60m
Place	Athlete	Country	Time
1st place, gold medalist(s)	Jelani Watkins	United States	6.68
2nd place, silver medalist(s)	Ajani Dwyer	United States	6.76
3rd place, bronze medalist(s)	Malachi James	United States	6.78
4	Antwan Jr. Hughes	United States	6.78
5	Jaden Wiley	United States	6.80
6	Tristan Wright	United States	6.80
7	Jake Odey-Jordan	United States	6.85
8	Terrence Mahomes	United States	6.90

Men's 300m
Place	Athlete	Country	Time	Heat
1st place, gold medalist(s)	Caine Stanley	United States	32.85	2
2nd place, silver medalist(s)	Jayden Mims	United States	32.94	2
3rd place, bronze medalist(s)	Nick Spikes	United States	33.22	2
4	James Long	United States	33.85	1
5	Jayvian Greene	United States	34.05	2
6	Joshua Davenport	United States	34.32	1
7	Jaylin Santiago	United States	34.34	1
8	Maximilian Deangelo	United States	34.41	1
9	Dylan Woodruffe	Trinidad and Tobago	34.60	1
10	Micah Walker	United States	34.89	2

Men's 600m
Place	Athlete	Country	Time
1st place, gold medalist(s)	Quincy Wilson	United States	1:17.36
2nd place, silver medalist(s)	Jaden Marchan	United States	1:17.96
3rd place, bronze medalist(s)	Jonathan Simms	United States	1:18.22
4	Colin Abrams	United States	1:19.58
5	Tyler Mathews	United States	1:19.71
6	David Davitt	Ireland	1:19.98
7	Nicholas Steed	United States	1:21.02

Men's Mile
Place	Athlete	Country	Time
1st place, gold medalist(s)	Riley Smith	United States	4:05.05
2nd place, silver medalist(s)	TJ Hansen	United States	4:05.87
3rd place, bronze medalist(s)	Byron Grevious	United States	4:07.78
4	Keegan Smith	United States	4:09.27
5	Nayan Kasperowski	United States	4:10.88
6	Tamrat Gavenas	United States	4:12.07
7	Soheib Dissa	United States	4:13.26
8	Ethan Walther	United States	4:15.18
9	Luke Schagelin	United States	4:15.25
10	Alex Pelov	United States	4:16.42
11	Jimmy Wischusen	United States	4:17.85
12	Conor Clifford	United States	4:26.44

Men's Triple Jump
Place	Athlete	Country	Mark
1st place, gold medalist(s)	Xavier Drumgoole	United States	15.15 m
2nd place, silver medalist(s)	Jaden Lippett	United States	15.13 m
3rd place, bronze medalist(s)	CJ Simbiri	United States	14.38 m
4	Liam Paneque	United States	14.18 m
5	Joachim Johnson	United States	14.01 m
6	Tyler Mathes	United States	13.97 m
7	Rocco Carpinello	United States	13.95 m
8	Drew Dillard	United States	13.92 m
9	Jordan Sowell	United States	13.74 m

Men's 4 × 200 m
Place	Athlete	Country	Time
1st place, gold medalist(s)	Dezmone Starks; Jake Odey-Jordan; Chase Dejesus; Damil Bostic	United States	1:26.34
2nd place, silver medalist(s)	Julian Roberson; Alexander Lambert; Matthew Goines; Wilson Quincy	United States	1:26.65
3rd place, bronze medalist(s)	Antwan Jr. Hughes; Micah Walker; Kobe Mack; Jaylin Bacote	United States	1:28.24
4	Joshua Akodu; Franklyn Akabi-During; Anthony Waterman; Myles Dixon	United States	1:28.85
5	Brandon Dong; Chase Wade; Chase Kaufman; Luke Petryna	United States	1:29.36
6	Jayden Perkins; Mason Samuels; Myles Dorsey; D'Kwan Thomas	United States	1:29.38

Men's 4 × 400 m
Place	Athlete	Country	Time
1st place, gold medalist(s)	David Pinnock; Anthony Barrett; Anthony Burnett; Brady Danyluk	United States	3:18.68
2nd place, silver medalist(s)	Dominic Bassey; Chukwuemeka Ajaegbulemh; Darrell Jackson; Jayden Poteat	United States	3:20.43
3rd place, bronze medalist(s)	Gideon Griffin; Andres Acosta; Ethan Sampson; Cooper Harwood	United States	3:23.20
4	Mason Garagliano; Michael Cromwell; Uriah Dieujuste; Anthony Couch	United States	3:24.31

Men's 4 × 800 m
Place	Athlete	Country	Time	Heat
1st place, gold medalist(s)	Joshua Gresham; Chase Lopez; Sayid Shakur; Daden Grogan	United States	7:48.07	2
2nd place, silver medalist(s)	Messiah McKinley; Jackson Crenshaw; Dean Solomon; Nathaniel Spears	United States	7:51.49	2
3rd place, bronze medalist(s)	Richard Newell; Nathan Terry; Benjamin Fuhrmeister; Nate Fehrman	United States	7:55.23	2
4	Eli Engelman; Curtis Conner; Dawson French; Michael Woolery	United States	7:55.24	2
5	Gabriel Wigutow; Jack Morelli; Collin McLaughlin; James Ciaccio	United States	7:56.11	1
6	Dev Patel; Edward Condolon; Joseph Dachnowicz; Brenden McMahon	United States	7:59.87	2

Women's 60m
Place	Athlete	Country	Time
1st place, gold medalist(s)	Adaejah Hodge	British Virgin Islands	7.25
2nd place, silver medalist(s)	McKenzie Travis	United States	7.26
3rd place, bronze medalist(s)	Brianna Selby	United States	7.32
4	Lisa Raye	United States	7.39
5	Olivia Pace	United States	7.42
6	Amoi Hagans	United States	7.43
7	Sariah Ostanie Doresca	Haiti	7.52
8	Davis Kiera	United States	7.76
9	Kyndal Dailey	United States	7.77

Women's 300m
Place	Athlete	Country	Time	Heat
1st place, gold medalist(s)	Sydney Sutton	United States	37.51	3
2nd place, silver medalist(s)	Skyler Franklin	United States	37.56	2
3rd place, bronze medalist(s)	Ashley Fulton	United States	38.35	3
4	Tyler Lowe	United States	38.51	2
5	Kennedy Brown	United States	38.54	1
6	Rhia Randolph	United States	38.59	2
7	Sianni Wynn	United States	38.66	1
8	Rachael Uvieghara	United States	38.89	1
9	Jasmine Sharps	United States	39.06	2
10	Nevaeh Burns	United States	39.69	1
11	Haylie Donovan	United States	40.53	1
12	Anna Vidolova	Bulgaria	40.88	3
13	Kaela Swift	United States	41.06	2
14	Sharly Ramirez-Castillo	United States	42.15	1

Women's 600m
Place	Athlete	Country	Time
1st place, gold medalist(s)	Alivia Williams	United States	1:30.79
2nd place, silver medalist(s)	Michelle Smith	U.S. Virgin Islands	1:30.96
3rd place, bronze medalist(s)	Allison Delisi	United States	1:31.26
4	Morgan Rothwell	United States	1:32.52
5	Sidney Nolan	United States	1:33.23
6	Kylee King	United States	1:34.34
7	Leonni Griffin	United States	1:34.96

Women's Mile
Place	Athlete	Country	Time
1st place, gold medalist(s)	Samantha Humphries	United States	4:41.43
2nd place, silver medalist(s)	Dylan McElhinney	United States	4:44.19
3rd place, bronze medalist(s)	Katherine Bohlke	United States	4:45.49
4	Abby Faith Cheeseman	United States	4:46.05
5	Isabelle Walsh	United States	4:46.27
6	Emily Bush	United States	4:46.36
7	Rylee Blade	United States	4:48.03
8	Elizabeth Leachman	United States	4:48.55
9	Sophia Rodriguez	United States	4:49.16
10	Emma Zawatski	United States	4:54.81
11	Zariel Macchia	United States	4:54.85
12	Ella Cohen	United States	4:54.91
13	Alyson Johnson	United States	5:04.19
14	Olivia Cieslak	United States	5:05.27

Women's Pole Vault
Place	Athlete	Country	Mark
1st place, gold medalist(s)	Veronica Vacca	United States	4.30 m
2nd place, silver medalist(s)	Lily Beattie	United States	4.10 m
3rd place, bronze medalist(s)	Jathiyah Muhammad	United States	4.00 m
4	Ava Allen	United States	4.00 m
5	Ella Galloway	United States	3.85 m
6	Amelia McBain	United States	3.70 m
7	Sophia Hill	United States	3.55 m

Women's Triple Jump
Place	Athlete	Country	Mark
1st place, gold medalist(s)	Sydnee Burr	United States	12.40 m
2nd place, silver medalist(s)	Corintia Griffith	United States	12.23 m
3rd place, bronze medalist(s)	Caitlyn Johnson	United States	12.14 m
4	Sophia Curtis	United States	12.09 m
5	Gabrielle Pierre	United States	12.03 m
6	Matilde Sofia Tejos	Chile	11.80 m
7	Samantha Ennin	United States	11.71 m
8	Jordynn West	United States	11.29 m

Women's 4 × 200 m
Place	Athlete	Country	Time
1st place, gold medalist(s)	Skyler Franklin; Adaejah Hodge; Alivia Williams; Michelle Smith	International team	1:34.78
2nd place, silver medalist(s)	Aida Joseph; Kennedy Flynn; Sydney Sutton; Kennedy Brown	United States	1:35.25
3rd place, bronze medalist(s)	Jasmine Sharps; Naaema Solomon; Jasmine Cook; Simisola Balogun	United States	1:36.58
4	Rhia Randolph; Taylor Cox; Sydney Chadwick; Taylor Aska	United States	1:38.03
5	Morgan Roundtree; Carrie Vannoy; Nevaeh Burns; Jayda Watson	United States	1:41.28

Women's 4 × 400 m
Place	Athlete	Country	Time	Heat
1st place, gold medalist(s)	Skhye Seamon; Olivia Okaro; Djassi Dean; Cinniya Robinson	United States	3:49.50	1
2nd place, silver medalist(s)	Chloe Jones; Billie Frazier; Ryan Jennings; Naylah Jones	United States	3:49.59	1
3rd place, bronze medalist(s)	Abriyah Thompson; Leah Gould; Isabella Murray; Natalia Thompson	United States	3:53.31	1
4	Athauna Williams; Skylar Skevelair; Shania Duke; Nyla Henderson	United States	3:56.70	2
5	Maddison Praylow; Sierra Passee; Brianna Lindo; Kylie Comas	United States	3:56.99	2
