= Yamada Green Dome Maebashi =

Arena in Maebashi, Japan

Nippon Totor Green Dome Maebashi
- Maebashi Velodrome

- Location within Gunma Prefecture Location within Japan
- Interactive map of Nippon Totor Green Dome Maebashi
- Former names: Maebashi Velodrome
- Location: Maebashi Gunma Prefecture, Japan
- Coordinates: 36°23′51.40″N 139°03′28″E
- Owner: Maebashi city
- Operator: Green Dome Maebashi Foundation
- Capacity: 12,596; Concert: 20,000; Track and field, Cycling: 7,584

Construction
- Opened: May 1990
- Main contractor: Shimizu Corporation

Tenants
- Gunma Crane Thunders (2012–2016); 1990 UCI Track Cycling World Championships; Keirin

Nippon Totor Green Dome Maebashi (日本トーターグリーンドーム前橋, Nihon Tōtā Gurīn Dōmu Maebashi) is an arena in Maebashi, Japan. With a capacity of 8,000, it is primarily used for indoor sports. One of its primary functions is as a velodrome - when it is known as Maebashi Velodrome (前橋競輪場, Maebashi Keirinjyō) - holding parimutuel Keirin races throughout the year.

Some of the international sports meets held in the past include the 1990 UCI Track Cycling World Championships and the 1999 IAAF World Indoor Championships. It is the former home arena of the Gunma Crane Thunders of the B.League, Japan's professional basketball league.

== Professional Keirin ==
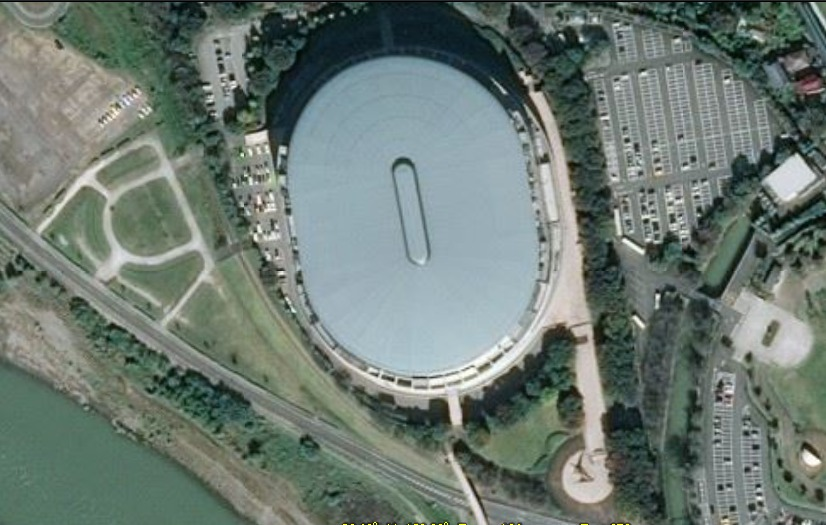
Satellite view

The Dome's velodrome oval is 335 meters in circumference. A typical keirin race of 2,035 meters consists of six laps around the course.

Green Dome Maebashi is one of only two indoor locations in Japan that offer professional keirin races - the other venue is Kokura Velodrome at the Kitakyushu Media Dome.

Maebashi's keirin identification number for betting purposes is 22# (22 sharp).

== Naming rights ==
Takasaki-based Yamada Denki purchased the naming rights in 2014, later Nippon Totor in 2022.

== See also ==
- List of cycling tracks and velodromes
- List of indoor arenas in Japan

Preceded by Tête d'Or (Georges Prévéral) Velodrome; Lyon	UCI Track Cycling World Championships; Venue; 1990	Succeeded by Hanns-Martin-Schleyer-Halle; Stuttgart
Preceded by Palais omnisports de Paris-Bercy; Paris	IAAF World Indoor Championships in Athletics; Venue; 1999	Succeeded by Pavilhão Atlântico; Lisbon
