= Shingo Inoue =

Japanese runner

Personal information
- Born: September 27, 1980 (age 46) Hachioji, Tokyo
- Height: 177 cm (5 ft 10 in)

Sport
- Country: Japan
- Sport: marathon, ultramarathon
Medal record
Representing Japan

Shingo Inoue (井上真悟, Inoue Shingo; born 27 September 1980) is a Japanese ultramarathon and marathon runner from Hachioji, Tokyo. He won the IAU 24 Hour Run World Championship held in Brive-la-Gaillarde, France in 2010 with the distance of 273.708 km (170.074 miles) at the age of 29. He won the International Tour de Taiwan Ultra-marathon in April, 2013 with a time of 109:25:21.

His personal best in full marathon is 2:29:12 achieved in 2013 at Katsuta Marathon, and his personal best in 100 km is 7:02:05 achieved in 2011 at Lake Saroma Ultramarathon.

== International competitions ==
Year	Competition	Venue	Position	Event	Notes
Representing Japan
2010	World Championships	Brive-la-Gaillarde, France	1st	24-hour run	273.708 km
