= Yusuke Suzuki (race walker) =

Japanese racewalker (born 1988)

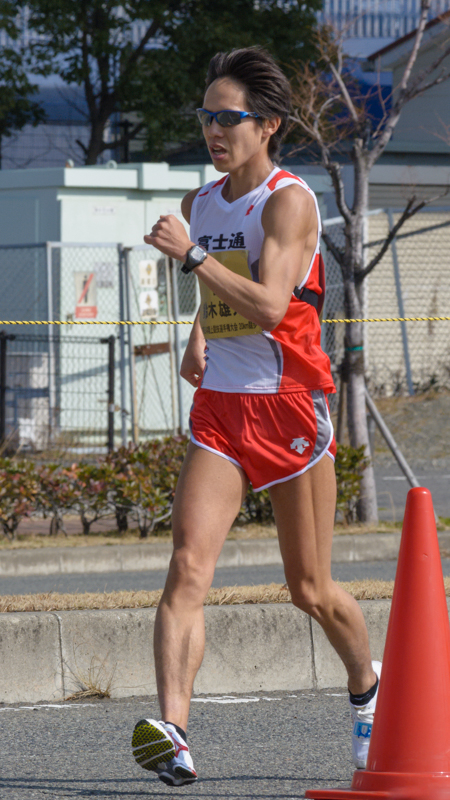
- Suzuki in 2014

Personal information
- Nationality: Japanese
- Born: 2 January 1988 (age 38) Nomi, Ishikawa, Japan
- Height: 169 cm (5 ft 7 in)
- Weight: 57 kg (126 lb)

Sport
- Country: Japan
- Sport: Athletics
- Event: Racewalking
- College team: Juntendo University
Medal record
World Championships
Gold medal – first place	2019 Doha	50 km walk
Asian Games
Silver medal – second place	2014 Incheon	20 km walk
World Junior Championships
Bronze medal – third place	2006 Beijing	10,000 m walk

Yusuke Suzuki (鈴木 雄介, Suzuki Yūsuke; born 2 January 1988) is a Japanese racewalker. He has represented Japan in the 20 km event twice at the World Championships in Athletics and competed at the 2012 Summer Olympics. He is the pending world record holder for the 20 km walk with a time of 1:16:36 hours at an event in his home town of Nomi in 2015.

Suzuki competed in race walking from a young age and his international debut came at the 2004 World Junior Championships in Athletics. He was the 10,000 metres walk bronze medallist at the 2005 World Youth Championships in Athletics and the 2006 World Junior Championships in Athletics. He began competing in the senior ranks a year later and came sixth in the 20 km walk at the Asian Race Walking Championships and fourth at the 2007 Summer Universiade. In the following two years he came tenth and fifth at the Asian Race Walking Championships. A personal best time of 1:22:05 hours in 2009 earned him a place at the 2009 World Championships in Athletics but he was among the last walkers to finish in the 20 km race.

He won the 2010 Asian title with a new best of 1:20:06 hours, but again did not perform well on the global stage, taking 40th place at the 2010 IAAF World Race Walking Cup. He placed fifth at the end of year Asian Games. The 2011 World Championships in Athletics saw him establish himself among the world's top walkers, as he placed eighth overall in the 20 km event. He pushed out the pace at the beginning of the 2012 London Olympics, but finished back down the order placing 36th. The start of the 2013 season saw Suzuki break the Japanese record twice – he won the national title in 1:19:02 hours then took his second Asian title with a finish in 1:18:34 hours in Nomi, Ishikawa.

Suzuki was selected to once again to compete for Japan at the 2020 Summer Olympics in Tokyo.

Records
Preceded by Yohann Diniz	Men's 20 km walk world record holder 15 March 2015 – 16 February 2025	Succeeded by Toshikazu Yamanishi
