= Marathon race walk =

Racewalking event in athletics

Athletics Marathon race walk
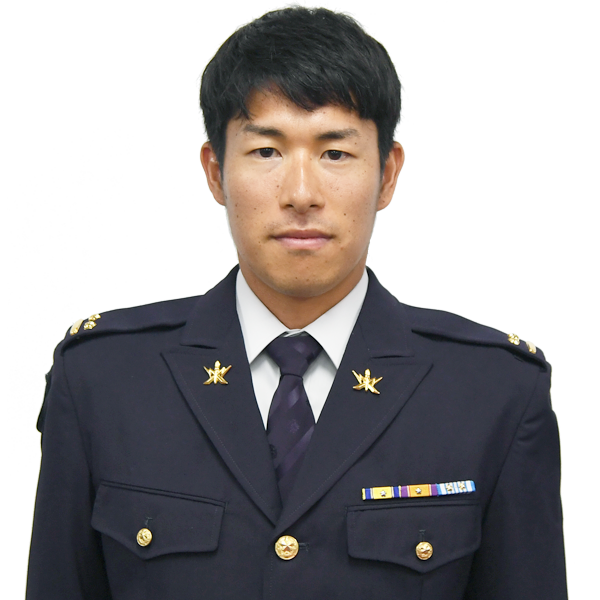
- Hayato Katsuki the winner of the race of Brasilia 2026

World Championship records
- Men: Hayato Katsuki (JPN) 2:55:28 (2025)
- Women: Katarzyna Zdziebło (POL) 3:24:19 (2025)

The Marathon race walk is a road racewalking event with a distance of 42.195 kilometres, which became a standard championship discipline from 2026, following a decision by the 236th World Athletics Council on 4 December 2024.

== History ==
Since the beginning of 2025, the first official competitions have begun to be held in the world, but the first international competition took place in Brasilia on 12 April 2026 on the occasion of the 2026 World Athletics Race Walking Team Championships.

== Area records ==
- Updated 3 November 2026.

Area	Men			Women		
Area	Time	Season	Athlete	Time	Season	Athlete
World	2:55:14	2026	Masatora Kawano (JPN)	3:14:52	2026	Rebecca Henderson (AUS)
Area records
Africa (records)
Asia (records)	2:55:14	2026	Masatora Kawano (JPN)			
Europe (records)	2:56:49	2026	Massimo Stano (ITA)	3:15:11	2026	Sofia Fiorini (ITA)
North, Central America and Caribbean (records)
Oceania (records)
South America (records)	3:05:57	2026	David Hurtado (ECU)	3:24:37	2026	Paula Milena Torres (ECU)

== See also ==
- 35 kilometres race walk
