= Toshihiko Seko =

Japanese long-distance runner

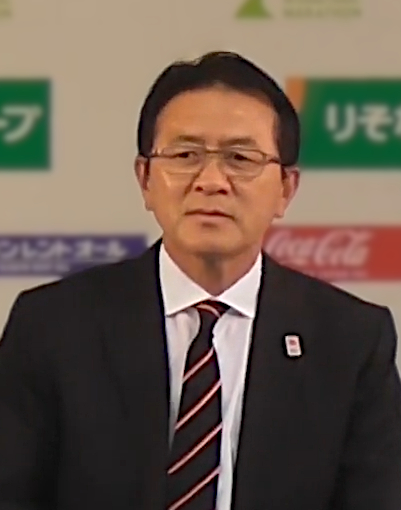
- Seko in 2018

Personal information
- Nationality: Japanese
- Born: July 15, 1956 (age 70) Kuwana, Mie, Japan

Sport
- Country: Japan
- Sport: Men's athletics
- Events: 5000 metres, 10,000 metres, half marathon, marathon

Achievements and titles
- Personal bests: 3000m: 7:56.47; 5000m: 13:24.29; 10,000m: 27:42.17; Marathon: 2:08:27
Medal record
Men's athletics
Representing Japan
Asian Games
Bronze medal – third place	1986 Seoul	10,000 m
Asian Championships
Gold medal – first place	1979 Tokyo	10,000 m

Toshihiko Seko (瀬古 利彦, Seko Toshihiko; born July 15, 1956) is a Japanese former long-distance runner. He was a world-class marathon competitor in the 1980s. He represented his native country at the 1984 Olympics in Los Angeles and the 1988 Summer Olympics in Seoul, South Korea.

Seko's notable marathon wins include Fukuoka Marathon (1978–1980, 1983), Boston Marathon (1981, 1987), London Marathon (1986) and Chicago Marathon (1986).

On March 22, 1981, Seko set world records at 25,000 m (1:13:55.8) and 30,000 m (1:29:18.8). The records stood for 30 years until they were broken by Moses Mosop in June 2011. On April 20, 1981, Seko shaved one second off Bill Rodgers's course record at the Boston Marathon.

Seko was a coach at the S & B Foods Track Team until the team was disbanded in 2012. He also was a member of the Tokyo 2016 Olympics Advisory Panel.

He serves on the Tokyo Metropolitan Government Board of Education from December 21, 2007.

He was devoted to the sport above other interests and once remarked "The marathon is my only girlfriend. I give her everything I have."

== International competitions ==
Year	Competition	Venue	Position	Event	Notes
Representing Japan
1979	Asian Championships	Tokyo, Japan	1st	10,000 m	28:59.2a
1984	Olympic Games	Los Angeles, United States	14th	Marathon	2:14:13
1986	Asian Games	Seoul, South Korea	3rd	10,000 m	29:31.90
1988	Olympic Games	Seoul, South Korea	9th	Marathon	2:13:41

== Marathons ==
Year	Competition	Venue	Position	Event	Notes
1977	Fukuoka Marathon	Fukuoka, Japan	5th	Marathon	2:15:00
1978	Fukuoka Marathon	Fukuoka, Japan	1st	Marathon	2:10:21
1979	Fukuoka Marathon	Fukuoka, Japan	1st	Marathon	2:10:35
1979	Boston Marathon	Boston, United States	2nd	Marathon	2:10:12
1980	Fukuoka Marathon	Fukuoka, Japan	1st	Marathon	2:09:45
1981	Boston Marathon	Boston, United States	1st	Marathon	2:09:26
1983	Tokyo Marathon	Tokyo, Japan	1st	Marathon	2:08:38
1983	Fukuoka Marathon	Fukuoka, Japan	1st	Marathon	2:08:52
1986	London Marathon	London, United Kingdom	1st	Marathon	2:10:02
1986	Chicago Marathon	Chicago, United States	1st	Marathon	2:08:27
1987	Boston Marathon	Boston, United States	1st	Marathon	2:11:50
1988	Lake Biwa Marathon	Ōtsu, Japan	1st	Marathon	2:12:41

== See also ==
- List of winners of the Boston Marathon
- List of winners of the London Marathon
