= Masatora Kawano =

Japanese racewalker (born 1998)

Personal information
- Nationality: Japanese
- Born: 23 October 1998 (age 28) Hyuga, Japan

Sport
- Sport: Athletics
- Event: Racewalking
Medal record
Men's athletics
Representing Japan
World Championships
Silver medal – second place	2022 Eugene	35 km walk
Bronze medal – third place	2023 Budapest	35 km walk

Masatora Kawano (川野 将虎, born 23 October 1998) is a Japanese race walker.

== Career ==
Kawano represented Japan at the 2020 Summer Olympics in Tokyo, finishing in 6th place in the 50 km walk and setting a season best.

Kawano won a silver medal at the 2022 World Athletics Championships in Eugene in the 35 km walk with an Asian record time of 2:23:15. He then won a bronze medal in the 35 km walk at the 2023 World Athletics Championships in Budapest.

He is the Japanese national record holder for the 50 km walk with a time of 3:36:45 in 2019.

On 27 October 2024, Kawano broke the world record for the 35 km walk in Takahata, Japan with a time of 2:21:47. At the same location, he broke the world record for the marathon race walk on 25 October 2026 with a time of 2:55:14.
