= Toshikazu Yamanishi =

Japanese racewalker (born 1996)

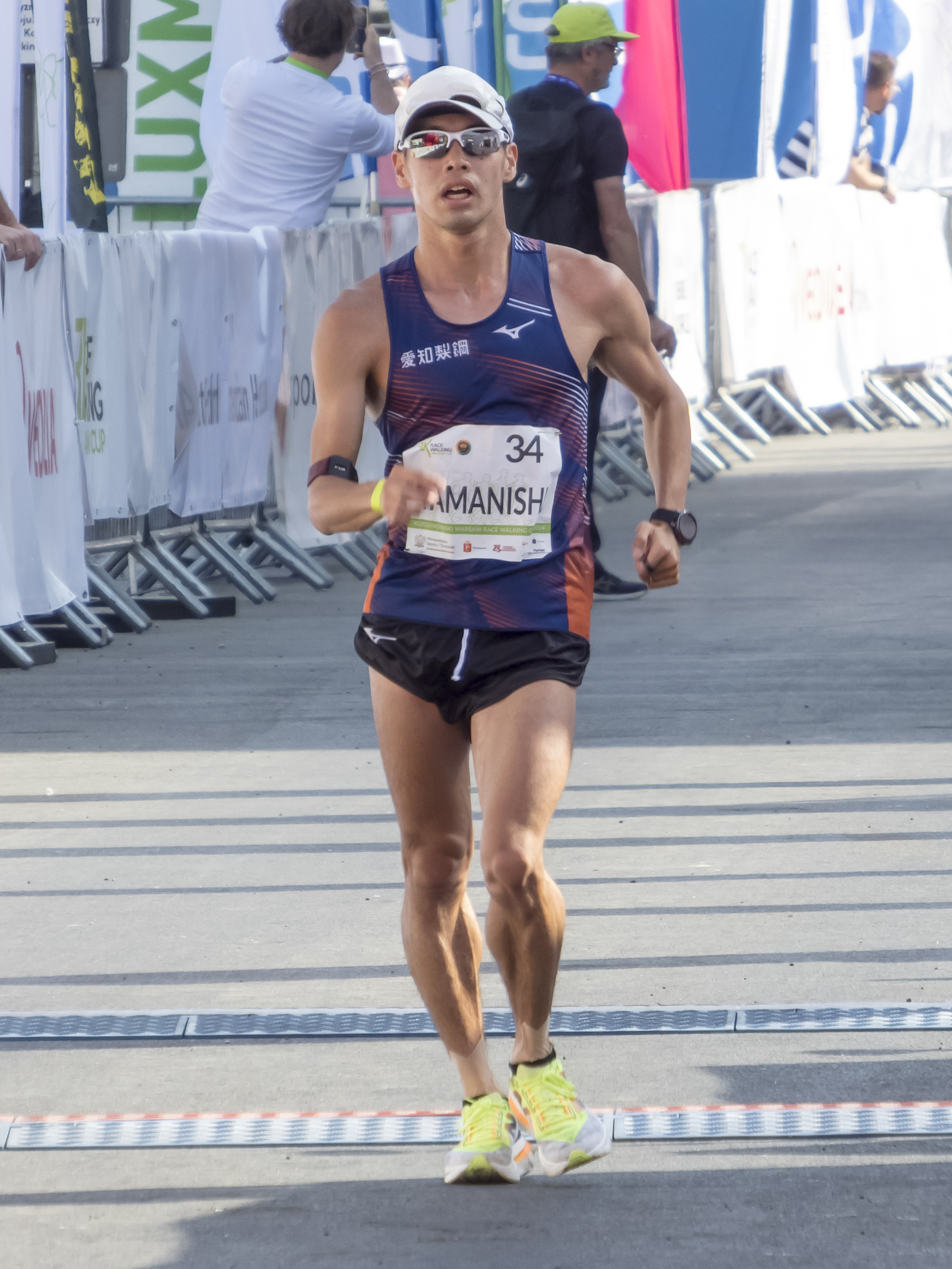
- Toshikazu Yamanishi at Korzeniowski Warsaw Race Walking Cup 2024

Personal information
- Nationality: Japanese
- Born: 15 February 1996 (age 30) Nagaokakyō, Kyoto, Japan
- Height: 1.64 m (5 ft 5 in)

Sport
- Country: Japan
- Sport: Athletics
- Event: Racewalking
Medal record
Men's athletics
Representing Japan
Olympic Games
Bronze medal – third place	2020 Tokyo	20 km walk
World Championships
Gold medal – first place	2019 Doha	20 km walk
Gold medal – first place	2022 Eugene	20 km walk
World Race Walking Cup
Gold medal – first place	2022 Muscat	20 km walk
Asian Games
Silver medal – second place	2018 Jakarta	20 km walk
Silver medal – second place	2026 Aichi-Nagoya	Half marathon walk
Summer Universiade
Gold medal – first place	2017 Taipei	20 km walk

Toshikazu Yamanishi (山西 利和, Yamanishi Toshikazu; born 15 February 1996) is a Japanese race walker.

== Career ==
Yamanishi won a gold medal in 20 kilometres race walk at the 2019 Asian Race Walking Championships in Nomi, with a World Leading time of 1:17.15 (2019 season).

At the 2019 and 2022 World Athletics Championships, Yamanishi won the gold medal in the 20 kilometres walk event, consecutively in 2019 and 2022.

On 16 February 2025, Yamanishi won the Japanese 20 kilometres Race Walking Championships with a new world record of 1:16:10 to break the previous record of 1:16:36 set by Yusuke Suzuki in 2015.

Records
Preceded by Yusuke Suzuki	Men's 20 km walk world record holder 16 February 2025 – present	Succeeded by Incumbent
