= Ekiden =

Long-distance running multistage relay race

Athletics Ekiden
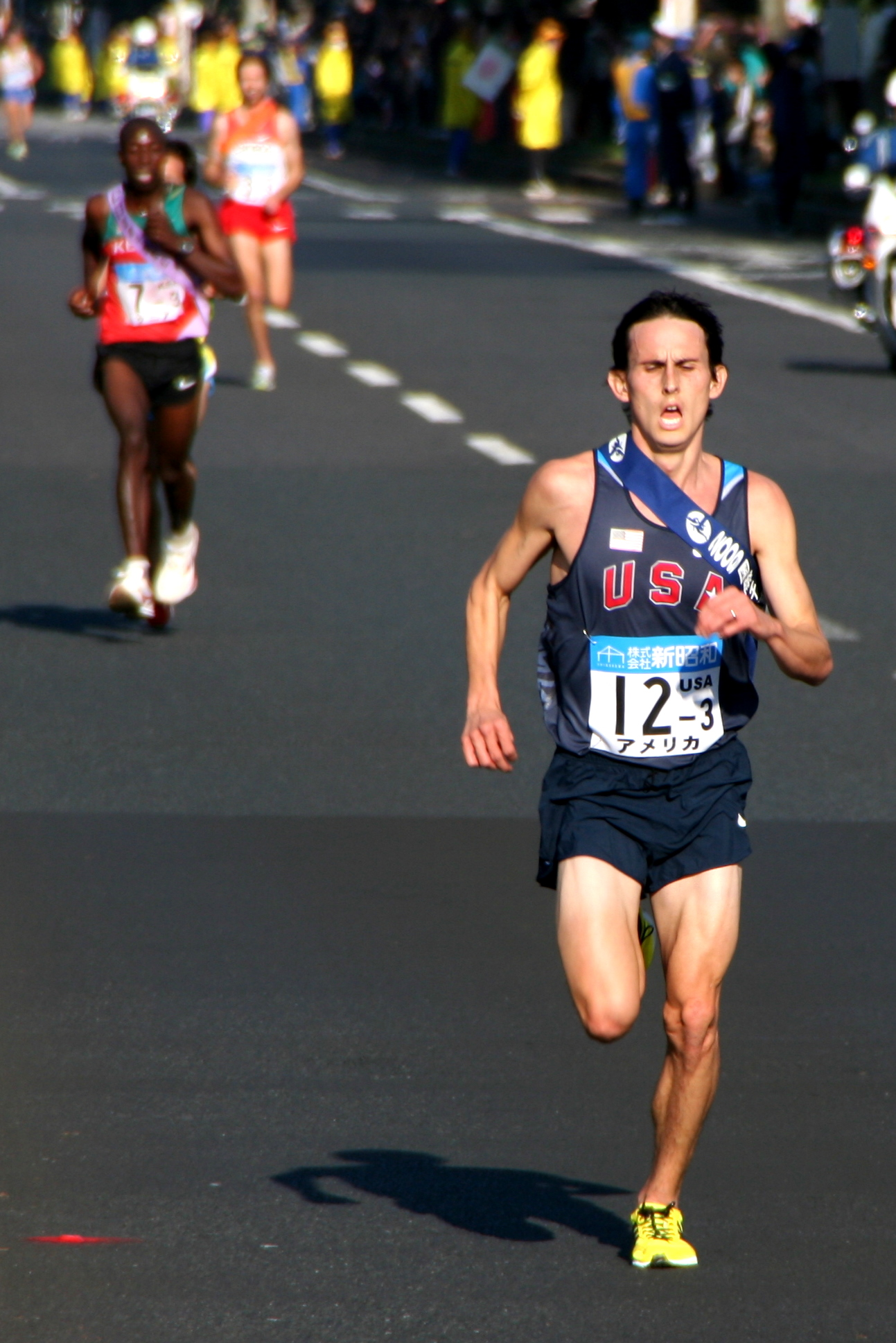
- Runners in the 2009 International Chiba Ekiden third leg

Ekiden (Japanese: 駅伝) is a long-distance running multi-stage relay race, mostly held on roads.

The original Japanese term referred to the age old post-horse or stagecoach courier system which transmitted communication by stages. Instead of one horse or a man covering the entire long distance a relay team of multiple horses or runners would be employed. Eki means "station" and den translates as "to communicate, to convey", therefore ekiden could be roughly translated as ''Station to station''. The original meaning of the word is reflected in its rule where each runner at the end of their run has to pass down their sash to the next runner.

The first ever ekiden as a sport was held in Japan in 1917 as a 3-day, 23-stage run from Kyoto to Tokyo over 507 kilometres (315 mi), to celebrate the 50th anniversary of Tokyo's establishment as the nation's capital (previously Kyoto was the imperial seat).

Today ekiden is a national sport in Japan, especially popular as inter-varsity competitions between schools or universities, and its popularity has since become widespread and worldwide.

The IAAF staged four editions of a World Road Relay Championship from 1992 (at Hiroshima, Japan) to 1998 as a stage race over the marathon distance with alternate stages of 5 km (3.1 mi) and 10 km (6.2 mi) before a final leg of 7.195 km (4.471 mi). The IAAF now recognizes world records for men for five stages (with a final leg of 12.195 km (7.578 mi)) and for women for six stages over the marathon distance.

== History ==
The first ekiden race was sponsored by the Yomiuri Shimbun in 1917, and was run over three days between the old Japanese capital of Kyoto and the modern capital of Tokyo, a distance of 508 km, to celebrate the anniversary of the moving of the capital from Kyoto to Edo, which was then renamed Tokyo.

In written Japanese, ekiden combines the character for "station" (駅) and another for "transmit" (伝) and as a word it goes back to ancient times. As a modern game, however, it owes its naming to the poet Zenmaro Toki (1885–1980), who was head of the Yomiuri Shimbun's Social Affairs Department at the time. The original concept of the race hearkens back to Japan's old Tōkaidō communication and transportation system in which stations were posted at intervals along the road. In the race, each runner runs the distance from one "station" to the next, and then hands off a cloth sash, or tasuki, to the next runner.

The lengths of ekiden in Japan can vary greatly, as can the number of runners on a team. For example, in the national junior high ekiden championship, 5 girls cover 12 kilometers and 6 boys cover 18 kilometers. The national high school championship involves 5 girls in a 21 kilometer race and 7 boys in a 42.195 kilometer race, the length of the modern Olympic marathon. In the national inter-prefecture championships, 9 women run 42.195 kilometers and 7 men run 48 kilometers. For the collegiate Hakone Ekiden, a 2-day event, 10 male athletes for each team run 21.9 kilometers. Each runner covers just over a half marathon. The mid-December National Corporate Women's Ekiden Championships, 6 runners cover 42.195 kilometers. In the January 1 National Corporate Men's Ekiden Championships, 7 runners cover 100.0 kilometers. For the mid-January national open championships (teams composed of selected junior high, high school and open athletes), the distances are 42.195 for the women and 48.0 for the men. Notably in distance, in the Round-Kyūshū Ekiden, a 10 days event, 72 segments cover 1064 kilometers around Kyushu Island and it is the longest relay race in the world.

== Contemporary ekiden in Japan ==
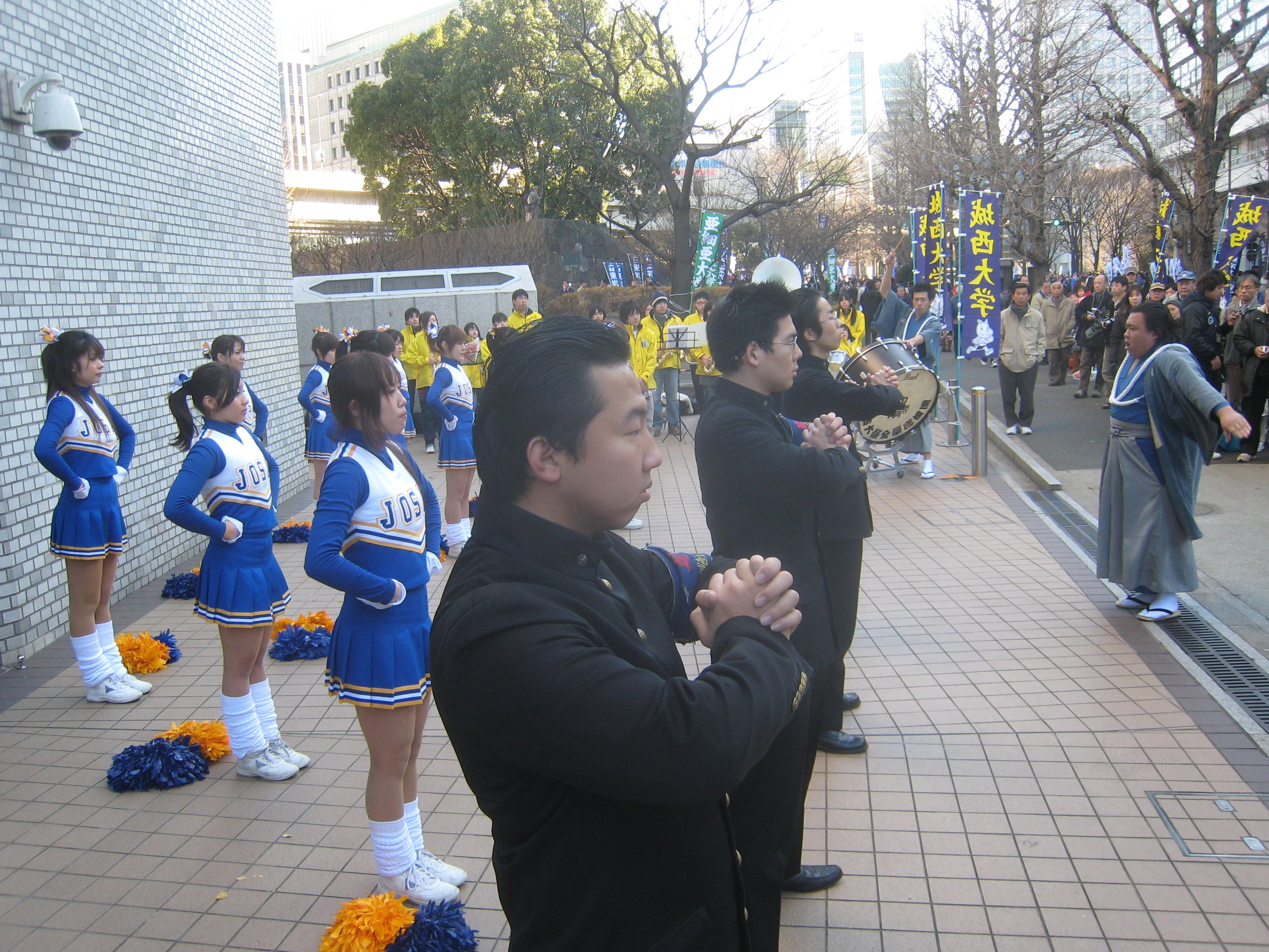
Typical university cheering leaders at a collegiate ekiden race, with mixture of American style cheerleaders and traditional Japanese oendan

One of the most popular modern ekidens in Japan is the Hakone Ekiden, which features teams of 10 male students from various Japanese universities of the Tokyo (Kanto) region. This race from central Tokyo along Tokyo Bay, past Yokohama to Hakone and back is held over two days at the New Year, covering 219 kilometers. It is a popular spectator sport that draws large crowds (a million or more) along the whole route and receives full network television coverage nationwide over the two days. Runners in the race compete to set individual records (e.g., stage times, number of schools passed) as well as to support their teams, and the race is considered to display many aspects of Japanese culture and spirit, including individual perseverance, identity within a group, and the importance within the Japanese hierarchy of allegiance to a major university. In the latter matter, there is a similarity to American school sports allegiance. The competitive level compares well with the highest levels of American universities. This comparison is based on participants' (Hakone Ekiden and NCAA Division 1 championships) personal best marks at 5000 meters, although in the Hakone Ekiden each runner covers just over a half marathon.

== Secondary schools ==
=== Comparison to cross country ===
For the athletes, ekiden provides an experience quite different from track and field. In Japanese secondary and tertiary education, ekiden racing gives the school's long distance runners a team racing experience that parallels but is yet different from cross country running as practiced in North American secondary and tertiary schools.

School-based teams and competition in the name of one's school are highly prized concepts common to both Japan and North America. It has been pointed out that such fervor over school sports is not shared by all, such as Korea where after-school academic clubs are more the norm, a point of worry for some track and field enthusiasts.

Other similarities between high school cross country as conducted in North America and high school ekiden in Japan include the season (autumn), approximate team size (5 to 7 competitors), and competition taking place on non-track venues. The differences are significant.

Unlike the American school sports clear distinction of "track season" and "cross country season", the Japanese autumn ekiden races are intermingled with standard track competitions, although many autumn track meets have a narrow focus, calling themselves "long distance" meets. Japan has a very highly structured format leading to a national high school championship for track in early August and for ekiden in late December, whereas the US school format ends at state championships in both sports. Japanese school ekiden teams compete infrequently, some only once or twice between September and December, unless they qualify to go on to higher levels; nationals are held in late December. American school cross country teams typically race almost weekly during September and October, with a narrowed set of school teams competing for state championships in late October or November. December post season American races like the Nike Cross Nationals and the Foot Locker Cross Country Championships are not officially school based.

Ekidens are usually road races, and as such require intensive route management and police traffic control. Cross country races can include grass, mud, sand, and steep slopes. Each ekiden competitor runs a different distance, whereas all cross country runners run the same course and start at the same time. Some Japanese high school ekiden stages are longer and some stages are shorter than the "standard" 5000 meters for US high school cross country (see below). Ekiden competition does not highlight the single individual winner of the race as in cross country, but ekiden analysis does highlight individual fastest runners in each stage; these runners may be in the middle of the field. Each ekiden runner has to run without reference to their own teammates for help in judging pace, whereas cross country team races can include strategies like "pack" running. This same contrast can be made between track and ekiden; only the runners in the first ekiden stage run as a group; later stage runners must judge for themselves the appropriate pace and the decisions to challenge and pass other runners, whose abilities might be significantly different and whose position was determined by the efforts of preceding teammates.

=== All-Japan High School Ekiden Championships ===
National championships are held for junior high and high school teams in late December. A series of city, prefecture and regional championships in November select the representative school teams for the national championship in late December.

==== Race format ====
Although there is no single definition of ekiden format, for purposes of the Japanese national championships for junior high school and high school, the format has been set. High school girls cover a half marathon; 5 runners follow the 6 – 4.1 – 3 – 3 – 5 kilometer pattern (total 21.1 kilometers). High school boys cover a full marathon; 7 runners follow the 10 – 3 – 8.1075 – 8.0875 – 3 – 5 – 5 kilometer pattern (total 42.195 kilometers).

=== All-Japan junior high school ekiden championship ===
In mid December, 48 teams representing all the regions and prefectures of Japan gather in Yamaguchi City of Yamaguchi Prefecture for the annual All-Japan Junior High School Ekiden Championships. For junior high school girls, a team of 5 girls run stages that follow the 3 – 2 – 2 – 2 – 3 kilometer pattern (total 12 kilometers). The boys team consists of 6 runners following the 3 – 3 – 3 – 3 – 3 – 3 kilometer pattern (total 18 kilometers). The 2011 race was the 19th annual competition. The junior high championship ekiden is not a road race but rather each runner runs a loop within the confines of a park. The boys team (6 boys) complete 18 kilometers, in a 3k-3k-3k-3k-3k-3k pattern. The girls team (5 runners) complete 12 kilometers, in a 3k-2k-2k-2k-3k pattern. In 2008 the winning boys team had an average pace of 5:01.9/mile or 9:26/3000 meters; the girls team had an average pace of 5:21.6/mile or just over 10:00/3000 meters.

Many of the elite high school and junior high school runners from these two races will be selected to represent their prefectures in the All-Japan Interprefectural Ekiden Championships.

=== Local and regional ===
==== Nihonkai Boys Ekiden – Nihonkai Kurayoshi Girls Ekiden ====
A 5-stage 21.0975 km (half marathon) high school girls ekiden is held in Kurayoshi, Tottori. Ninety high school teams participated in the 26th annual meet on October 2, 2011. In the boys race, the 31st annual Nihonkai Ekiden, 128 teams participated in the 7 stage race. Both the boys and girls races are exactly the same configuration as the national high school championships.

==== East Japan Women's Ekiden ====
The annual East Japan Women's Ekiden is held in Fukushima, Fukushima. Nine stages cover 42.195 kilometers. It is a regional version of the Empress Cup National Women's Ekiden in January, with 18 prefectural teams made up of runners ranging from junior high to professional. The winning team in the 24th annual running in 2008 was from Tokyo, with a time of 2:19:15.

2011 Stage Best Performances

- First Stage (6.0 km) – Yuko Shimizu (Nagano Pref.) – 19:04
- Second Stage (4.0 km) – Hitomi Nakamura (Kanagawa Pref.) – 12:58
- Third Stage (3.0 km) – Haruka Wada (Saitama Pref.) – 9:58
- Fourth Stage (3.0 km) – Yuka Kobayashi (Tochigi Pref.) – 9:18
- Fifth Stage (5.0875 km) – Yurie Doi (Chiba Pref.) – 16:21
- Sixth Stage (4.1075 km) – Sakiko Naito (Chiba Pref.) – 12:44 – Course Record
- Seventh Stage (4.0 km) – Saki Nakayama (Saitama Pref.) – 13:01
- Eighth Stage (3.0 km) – Yukine Oguchi (Nagano Pref.) – 9:15
- Ninth Stage (10.0 km) – Mika Yoshikawa (Kanagawa Pref.) – 32:25

2011 Top Team Results

1. Kanagawa Pref. – 2:16:57 (CR)
2. Nagano Pref. – 2:17:03 (CR)
3. Chiba Pref. – 2:18:55
4. Fukushima Pref. – 2:19:19
5. Saitama Pref. – 2:19:22
6. Tokyo – 2:19:28

== University/Collegiate ==
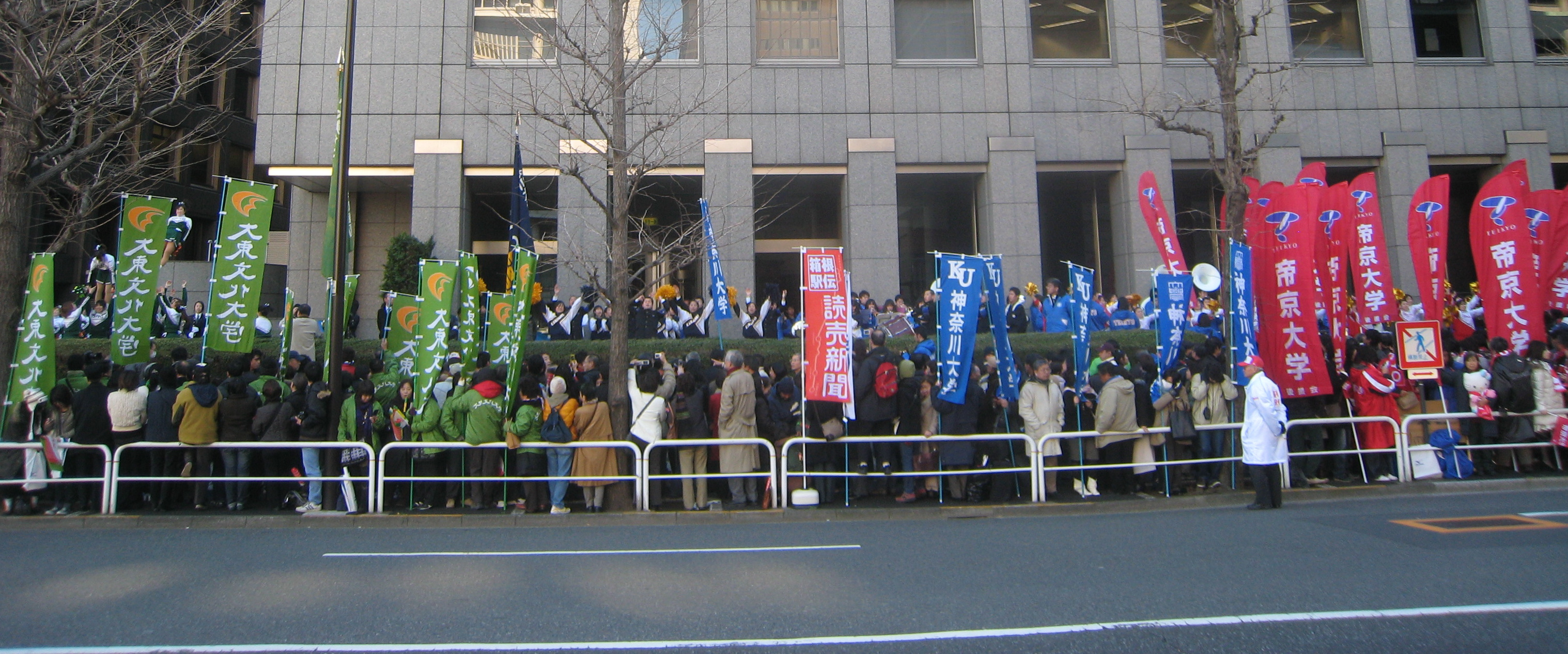
Banners naming participating schools will be visible throughout the typical ekiden race course.

In addition to the abovementioned Hakone Ekiden at the beginning of the new year, there are many other collegiate ekiden races.

=== Izumo Ekiden ===
The Izumo Ekiden in Izumo City, Shimane Prefecture of western Japan marks the beginning of the collegiate ekiden season and is for male university athletes. Teams come from all over Japan. The race is 6 stages (8k, 5.8k, 8.5k, 6.5k, 5k, 10.2k.) covering 43.1 kilometers. The 20th annual race was held on October 13, 2008. Since 1998, a select team of Ivy league alumni runners from the United States has competed and found the competition quite stiff. The Ivy league representatives had finished in the last half of the field each time, until 2024, when they finished fifth.

=== All-Japan Collegiate Women's Ekiden Championship (Morinomiyako Ekiden) ===
The annual All-Japan Collegiate Women's Ekiden Championship, begun in 1981 and also called Morinomiyako Ekiden, is held in Sendai Miyage Prefecture at the end of October. It is a 6-stage, 38.6 kilometer race from Miyagi Track and Field Grounds to Sendai City Hall.

=== All-Japan Collegiate (Men's) Ekiden Championship ===
On the first Sunday of November, the men compete in the 8 stage, 106.8 kilometer National Collegiate Ekiden Championship in Aichi and Mie Prefectures. This race is the second of the season's big three, the first being the Izumo Ekiden and the last being the Hakone Ekiden. Here, 27 teams battle for the national title. The race starts in front of Atsuta Shrine in Nagoya City and then proceeds out of the city, along the coast and 106.8 kilometers later to Ise Grand Shrine in Ise, Mie Prefecture.

=== Biwako University Ekiden ===
More than 20 Kansai area universities gather for the eight-stage, 83.6 km Biwako University Ekiden. It has been likened to the Kanto area's Hakone Ekiden.

=== Shikoku Ekiden ===
The Shikoku Ekiden is five-stage, 21.0975 km, run November 20, 2011.

=== All-Japan Collegiate Women's Invitational Ekiden ===
Tsukuba, Ibaraki Prefecture, is host to the All-Japan Collegiate Women's Invitational Ekiden, the 6th annual having been held on December 23‚ 2008. The race is 6 stages and a distance of 30.67 kilometers. The competition was recessed for 2010 and 2011, with hopes of securing sponsorships in 2012 or later, says the Inter-University Athletic Union of Japan.

=== Tokyo-Hakone Ekiden ===
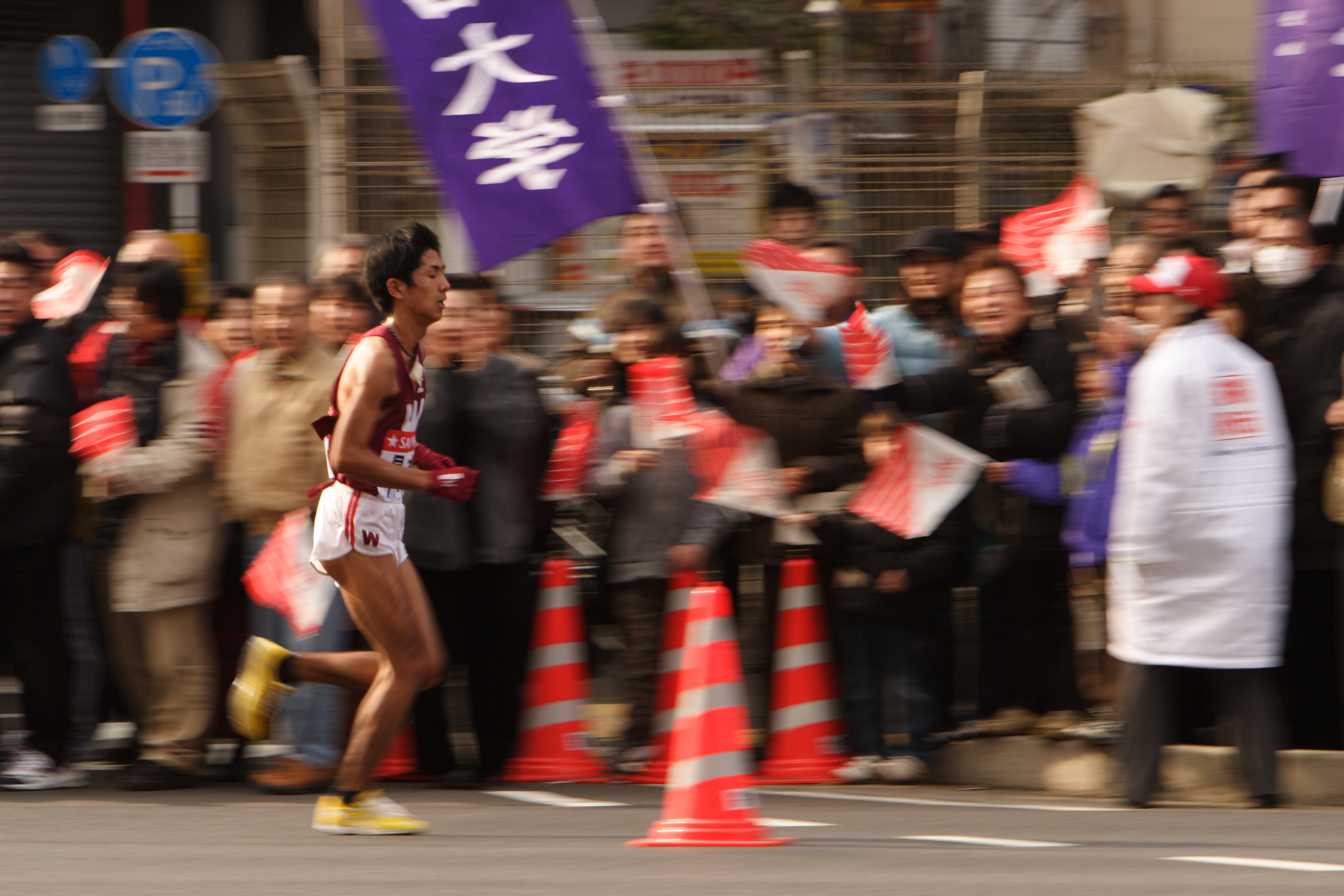
Waseda University's runner in 2007 Hakone Ekiden 10th Leg

January 2 and 3 is the date for the annual Hakone Ekiden. The Izumo and National Collegiate ekidens plus the Hakone Ekiden have been coined the triple crown of collegiate ekiden.

=== Others ===
Fukui Super Ladies' Ekiden, November 11, 2011 for university and corporate women's teams.

Other major collegiate ekiden races include Western Japan Regional University Women's Ekiden, Eastern Japan Regional University Women's Ekiden, National Invitational Ekiden

==== Kansai Intercollegiate Ekiden ====
.

== Other major events ==
=== All-Japan Interprefectural Ekiden Championships ===
==== Overview ====
The All-Japan Interprefectural Ekiden Championships are held in January. The Empress Cup – Interprefectural Women's Ekiden is held in Kyoto, on the third Sunday in January. The Interprefectural Men's Ekiden is held in Hiroshima, in recent years on the fourth Sunday of January.

==== Men's All-Japan Interprefectural Ekiden Championship ====
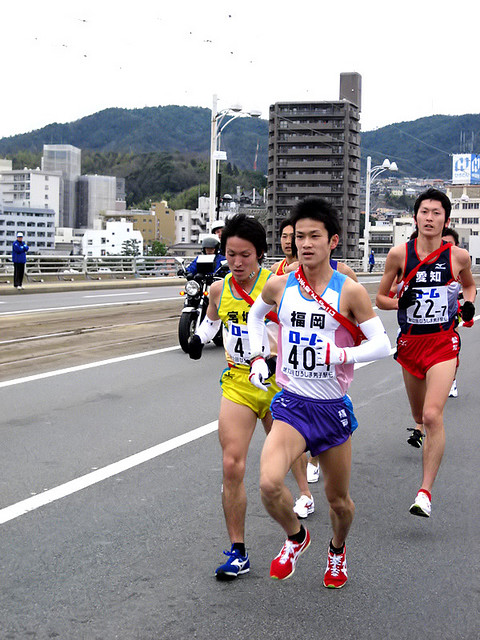
Runners in 2007 meeting 7th Leg

In the Men's All-Japan Interprefectural Ekiden Championship, 7 runners run 48 kilometers in stages of 7k 3k 8.5k 5k 8.5k 3k and 13k In both races, each team is composed of runners selected to represent one prefecture, a total of 47 teams in each race. The majority of the team members are high school and junior high school elite runners. Junior high runners are assigned to the two 3k stages and high school runners are assigned to the 7k, the 5k and 8.5k stages. Open runners are placed in the remaining 8.5k stage and the 13k stage. In 2009 the team from Nagano took its 5th title in 6 years.

==== Women's All-Japan Interprefectural Ekiden Championship – The Empress Cup ====
The Women's All-Japan Interprefectural Ekiden Championships – Empress Cup – is held in Kyoto on the third Sunday in January. The 2012 running marks the 30th annual event. Forty-seven teams from the 47 prefectures of Japan compete. The course is the same as the course for the high school boys national ekiden race held on the third Sunday of December (see above) (map in Japanese), except that the women's relay has 9 stages (rather than 7) over the 42.195 kilometers. The stages are 6k, 4k, 3k, 4k, 4.0175k, 4.0875k, 4k, 3k, and 10k. The two 3k stages are reserved for junior high athletes and generally high school athletes run the five stages that are 4k or just over 4k. Collegiate and open runners take the 6k and 10k stages. The mixed-age squads maintain a rapid pace.

In 2009, the team from Kyoto took its 13th championship and, as of that year, in the ekiden's 20 years Kyoto has only twice placed outside the top 6. Okayama took its first ever title in 2010, Kyoto reclaimed it in 2011, and in 2012 Kyoto finished second, a minute back from the winning team from neighboring Osaka.

==== School-Age participants ====
Of the 94 junior high school boys running the 3k stages in 2009, 62 were between 8:30 and 9:10. Of the 94 junior high school girls running 3k stages, 39 were between 9:21 and 10:00. Of the 188 high school girls running the 4 legs of 4000m to 4175m, 68 were under 10:00/3k pace. The 141 high school boys ran 3 distances: 7k (34 were between 20:10 and 21:00) or 5k (25 were between 14:28 and 15:00) or 8.5k (28 were between 23:55 and 26:00).

=== International ===
==== Chiba International Ekiden ====
Inaugurated in 1988, the November Chiba International Ekiden (2008–2011 results posted) was two separate races – one for men and one for women. From 2007, it has changed format into a combine male/female race. In 2008, 13 teams from 11 countries participated; in 2011 it was 12 teams from 10 countries. The race is contested in six stages over 42.195 kilometers, exactly a marathon. The race begins and ends at the Chiba Sports Center Track and Field Complex (on the monorail). The first 5k stage, third 10k stage, and fifth 10k stage are reserved as men's stages, while 5k second stage, 5k fourth stage and 7.195k sixth stage are reserved for women.

==== Yokohama International Women's Ekiden ====
The Yokohama International Women's Ekiden, from 2000 to 2008, was won 7 times by foreign teams. The 27th annual running of the race on February 22, 2009, was the final time. The race was run in six-stages over a 42.195 kilometer course beginning and ending at Yokohama's Red Brick Warehouse (Akarenga) arts space. "With last year's demise of the Tokyo International Women's Marathon, the ekiden is being replaced with a new Yokohama International Women's Marathon to take place in November."

== Corporate ==
The All-Japan Corporate Ekiden Championships structure involves regional qualifying races (more details) throughout Japan in November followed by a national championship for women in December and men on New Year Day.

=== All-Japan Women's Corporate Ekiden Championship ===
The All-Japan Women's Corporate (Jitsugyodan) Ekiden Championship are held in mid December after 3 regional qualifying ekiden.

=== All-Japan Men's Corporate Ekiden Championship ===
The All-Japan Men's Corporate Team Ekiden Championships, held in Maebashi, Gunma Prefecture on New Years Day, is also referred to as New Year Ekiden. This race for men's teams covers 100 kilometers in 7 stages. It has been claimed that the high TV viewership of this meet makes it the central motivating event in the annual calendar for professional Japanese male runners.

=== Asahi Ekiden ===
Following the men's New Year's Day race in Gunma, the men race again in Fukuoka Prefecture, the Asahi Ekiden. The 60th annual version was held on January 12, 2009. A mixture of corporate and university teams competed, 21 teams taking part in the 7-stage, 99.9 kilometer ekiden. The 2011 running was the final running of the race.

=== Women's Kita-Kyushu Ekiden ===
The corporate women's teams take their turn, racing in the Women's Kita-Kyushu Ekiden. The 20th annual race was held on January 18, 2009, from Fukuoka to Kokura on Japan's southern island of Kyushu. The distance is 32.8 kilometers. The open division women run it in 5 stages and the high school women's teams run it in 6 stages. First place in 2009 was 1:43:56 for the open and 1:47:22 for the high school. Eighth place for both was just over 1:50. 1:50 is about a 10:03 3k pace.

=== Minami Kyushu Ekiden ===
On February 1, 2009, 51 one teams competed the 63rd annual 7 stage 61.25 km race starting in Ebino City, Miyazaki Prefecture. The first place team managed a 15:15/5k pace and the 8th place team was 15:45/5k pace.

=== Gifu to Nagoya Ekiden ===
February 1, 2009 marked the 63rd annual Gifu (Gifu Prefecture) to Nagoya (Aichi Prefecture) Ekiden for men. The race is 6 stages covering 52.6k for the open division and 6 stages covering 40.2k for the high school division. The open winners in 2009 covered the distance in 2:31:14 (14:25 5k pace) and the high school winners were 1:59.15 (14:50 5k pace). The 8th place high school boys team managed a 15:15 5k pace.

== Kanto Region ==
Kanto Region is a region of Japan, and the south and western portions includes Tokyo, Saitama, Chiba and Kanagawa prefectures. The winter months provide a full schedule of community races. The races below are listed in calendar order, starting in October. The listing is not exhaustive for the region and does not include the exclusively secondary and tertiary school and professional ekidens which are linked to the prefecture and national championships (see above). Many other regions of Japan would have similar calendars.

=== Tamagawa Ekiden Carnival ===
The first Saturday in October (October 5, 2011) is the date set for the Tamagawa Ekiden Carnival. The race is an out-and-back relay along the Tama River. Each runner goes out and returns to the central meet site. The long course version is 23 kilometers (10 km～5 km～3 km～5 km), and the short course version is 12 kilometers (5 km～3 km～1 km～3 km). The race is held at Furuichi track and field facility (古市場陸上競技場). This ekiden strives to be inclusive of all ages and abilities.

=== East Japan International (Sagamihara) Ekiden ===
The first Sunday in October is when the East Japan International Ekiden (東日本国際駅伝) is held in (Sagamihara, Kanagawa). The meet proclaims itself to be for teams from "my pace" to "elite". It is held in Sagamihara's Sagami General Depot (相模総合補給廠); entrance via Gate 5. The proximity of American and Japanese culture lends the international flavor to the event. A post-race American lunch picnic is a special feature.

There are entry categories for all ages and speeds. Relay distances are 25k, 20k, and 15k, all divided into 4 stages. Registration is usually closed by mid August. The meet website proclaims that 2,645 teams were entered in 2011.

=== Shounan (Hiratsuka Kanagawa) Ekiden ===
The third Sunday in November (November 20, 2011) is the date for the Shounan Hiratsuka Ekiden (湘南ひらつか駅伝) in Hiratsuka (Kanagawa). The format is 4 stage race, but the distance per stage varies from 1 km (lower elementary) to 5 km (open). Male, female and mixed teams are welcomed, limited to 70 teams; individuals who come can be linked up with a team on day of meet.

=== Okutama (Tokyo) Ekiden ===
On the first Sunday of December, the Okutama Ekiden has been run in the mountain valleys of Ōme of Western Tokyo annually since 1936. It is a mixture of local university teams, serious running clubs and high school teams. In the December 4, 2011 race, 111 open teams, 29 college teams, 4 high school teams, and 50 women's teams participated.

One of the hallmarks of this ekiden is that it literally parallels a train line and races from station to station to station. Based on the 2011 race, men's teams run 6 stages totaling 47 kilometers (7.4 km – 8.4 km – 6.5 km – 6.3 km – 8.4 km – 7.4 km). This race begins 10:00 at the Ome City Hall. The women's ekiden is 3 stages over 11.1 kilometers (3.6 km – 3.6 km – 3.9 km). It begins at Mitake Station (御嶽駅前) at 11:30. Slow teams are subject to a time limit.

=== Saitama Elementary Ekiden ===
The first Saturday of December marks the Saitama Elementary Ekiden, held at Kumagaya Sports Park. In 2011, 44 mixed club teams competed in the following pattern: girl boy girl boy girl boy. Each runner ran 1.5 kilometers.

=== Saitama Ekiden ===
The second Sunday of January (January 15, 2012) is the annual Saitama Ekiden. The 2012 race was the 79th annual. The open men's race is 6 stages covering 50.9 kilometers. High school boys cover 41.7 km in 6 stages. Open women and high school girls cover 22.8 km in 5 stages. Application for participation closed November 11, 2011. The race begins in Fukaya City and ends in Ageo, with the shorter races starting at way points in between. Forty open boys and men's teams, 40 high school boys teams, and almost 20 high school girls teams typify recent participation levels.

A junior high race is conducted at the same time, the recent meets involving 60 junior high girls teams and 60 junior high boys. Girls run (3.2 km～2 km～2 km～2 km～3 km), and boys run (3.2 km～3 km～3 ～3 ～3 ～3 ). The junior high race is conducted within Kumagaya Sports Park.

=== Shibuya (Tokyo) New Ekiden ===
On the third Sunday of January, a four-stage 11.6 km ekiden is held annually in Yoyogi Park of Shibuya (Tokyo). The race is called Shibuya New Ekiden (しぶやニュー駅伝確定結果). The 58th annual running was January 20, 2008 and was attended by over 204 teams.

The January 15, 2012 race was the 62nd annual race. 35 girls junior high teams, 72 boys junior high teams, 27 open women's teams, 152 open men's teams, and 26 over-40 teams participated, a significant growth in recent years. Additionally 25 other 7-member teams of mixed age (which must have male and female from upper elementary and from junior high, plus an over 40 contestant and an open male and female contest over high school) competed, by adding on two 1,350 meter stages for the elementary runners and an additional 2,900 meter stage for a total of 7 stages.

The ekiden is run in heats, so that each category has its own start time. Preregistration for this annual event is open during the second and third week of November, at the Shibuya Sports Center and the Ward Central Office.

=== Sagamihara (Kanagawa) Ekiden ===
The third Sunday in January is the traditional date for the Sagamihara (Kanagawa) Ekiden, sponsored by the Sagamihara Amateur Sports Association. The race is held at Asamizo-Stadium park. The 2012 competition was the 72nd annual event.

Competition is categorized into junior high, high school, collegiate and open. Collegiate and open teams (10 in 2012) start the 6 stage race at 9:00 and run a 6-stage course around the outside of the park. The 2012 winning time was 1:53:12. The high school teams (20 in 2012, gender unspecified), starting at 9:10, do the same. Winning time in 2012 was 1:56:30. Open teams (69 teams in 2012, gender unspecified) start a 5-stage race at 9:20, using the same inside-the-park course that the junior high teams run later. The junior high 5-stage race begins at 10:30. In 2012, nearly 20 teams for each gender participated, the boys winner was 44:24 (1 minute slower than the open winner) and the girls winner was 51:06.

=== Tokyo German Village (Chiba) Ekiden ===
The fourth Saturday in January has been designated for the Tokyo German Village Ekiden, which began in 2011. January 28, 2012 was the second. The race is conducted in the park of Tokyo German Village, Chiba. The 4-member teams complete 20 km, with each stage running two 2.5 km laps within the park. Pair runs and "chibiko" children's runs are also held. The event is limited to 600 teams. There is a post-race BBQ and beer garden.

=== OkuMusashi (Saitama) Ekiden ===
On the last Sunday of January, the OkuMusashi Ekiden (see 奥むさし駅伝競走大会) has been held in Hannō City, Saitama Prefecture, since 2002. A similar competition had been held for 48 years, but was ended in 1999. The current race is an ekiden, with participating teams being a mixture of local university teams, serious running clubs and high school teams; the vast majority are male teams. In 2012 (the tenth annual), 59 high school teams representing 52 high schools entered, along with 161 teams from universities and running clubs. Most university squads use this race to give younger runners a chance for competition, giving the high school teams a chance to finish near the top.

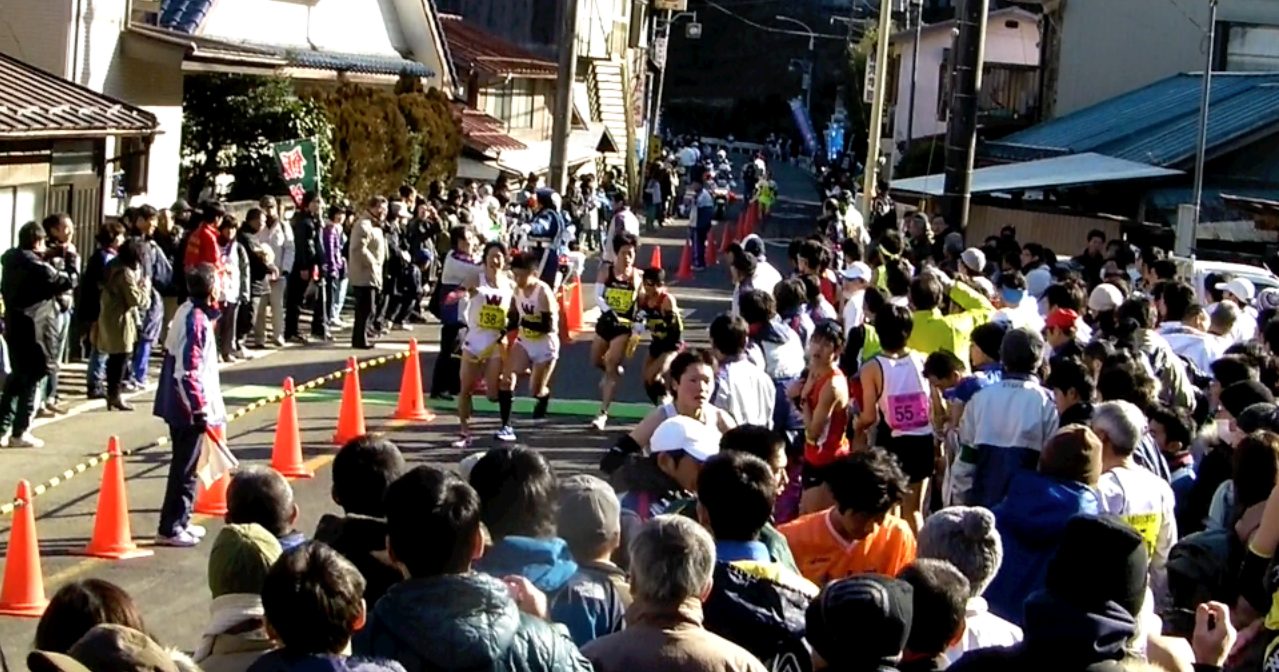
Runners run up the Koma River valley; view from train paralleling the race, on the other side of the river

The race is 38.792 kilometers (net vertical gain of 120 meters but with many gentle ups and downs), starting at Higashi Hanno station. The course winds through the city of Hanno, then up the long, narrow valley toward Chichibu, with a turn-around at Nishi Agano station. There are 6 legs or stages, the first three being up hill to Nishi Agano and the returning 3 descending back to Hanno City. The first and last leg are just over 9 kilometers, and the middle stages are between 4.2 and 5.4 k and the exchange points are situated near rail stations along the valley. The race uses highway 299 (which is blocked off for the race) up the narrow, winding valley and parallels the Koma River and the Seibu rail line.

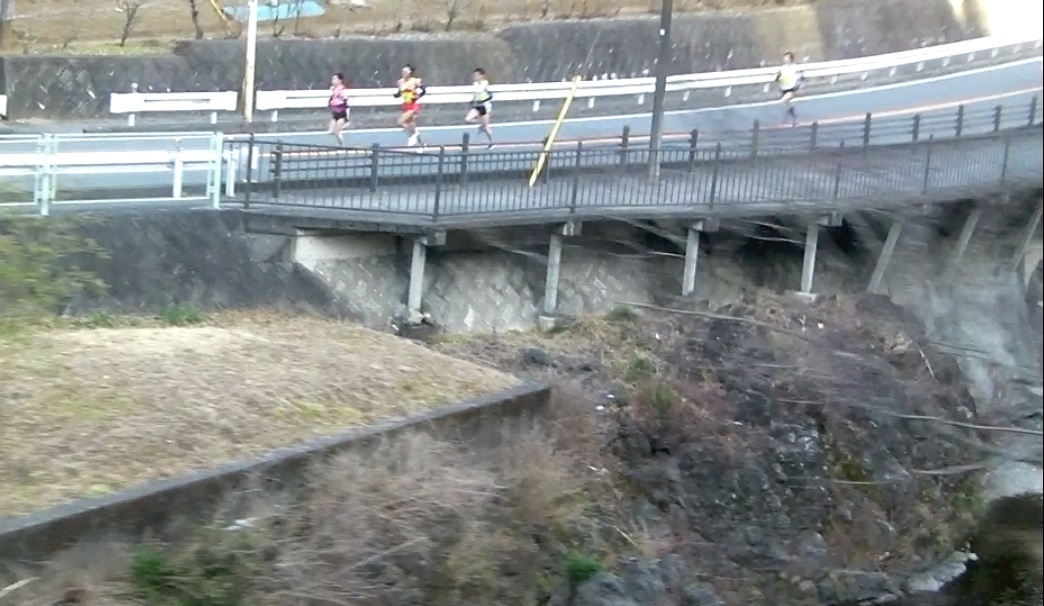
Runners run up the Koma River valley; view from train paralleling the race, on the other side of the river

A special train is timed to take spectators up the valley, departing Higashi Hanno station just after the start and arriving at the race turn-around, at Nishi Agano station, in time to catch the action. Along the way, glimpses of the race can be seen from the rail cars. A timely return train brings spectators back to the finish.

=== Odaiba Ekiden ===
Sunday January 29, 2012, was the 4th annual Odaiba Ekiden, held at Shiokaze Park (潮風公園). The race is conducted within the park and is divided into 5 stages of 5.0k for high school and above, 3.0k for elementary school and above. Registration closes in mid-December. Odaiba is a popular waterfront park and shopping area, in the bay in front of the city of Tokyo.

Runners begin the first stage of the 14.9k ekiden in Hachiōji.

=== Hachioji (Tokyo) All-Kanto Yume Kaido Ekiden ===
On the first Sunday of February, from in front of Hachioji JR Station, the city of Hachiōji-sponsored All-Kanto Hachioji Yume Kaido (Dream Street) Ekiden (全関東八王子夢街道駅伝競走大会) begins. The course proceeds past Nishi Hachioji Station and loops around Keio Hazama and Meijirodai stations.

The 2012 edition of the race is the 62nd annual. Since 2001 the meet has expanded its categories, with increased emphasis on junior high and on separating men's open and collegiate. For the February 5, 2012 meet, 203 men's open teams, 78 men's collegiate teams, 68 women's open (including a few collegiate) teams, 72 boys' high school teams, 23 girls' high school teams, 25 boys' junior high teams and 16 girls' junior high teams were entered, nearly 500 relay teams. (Registration for the meet is open from first of November to first of December.) The printed meet program names approximately 1000 volunteers, not including innumerable police and traffic regulators along the 10 kilometers of city streets.

Hachioji is home to a large number of colleges. What is notable is that so few colleges and universities fielded a women's team for this race.

The race starts in two waves, at 10:00 (high school boys and collegiate and open men) and 10:10 (junior high boys and all women's teams). Teams in the first wave run 20.7 kilometers, divided into 4 stages (4.7k – 6.2k – 5.4k – 4.4k). The teams in the second wave run 14.9 kilometers; the high school and open women divide the distance into 4 stages (4.7k – 2.3k – 3.4k – 4.4k) and the junior high teams divide the distance into 5 stages.

=== Tokyo International Exchange Ekiden ===
The Tokyo International Exchange Ekiden (国際交流駅伝) is held on the second Saturday of February. The race is limited to contestants 18 and older. Teams of three members link to relay the tasuki in three 5 km stages. The course begins and ends at Takebashi, encompassing one loop around the Tokyo Imperial Palace for each stage.

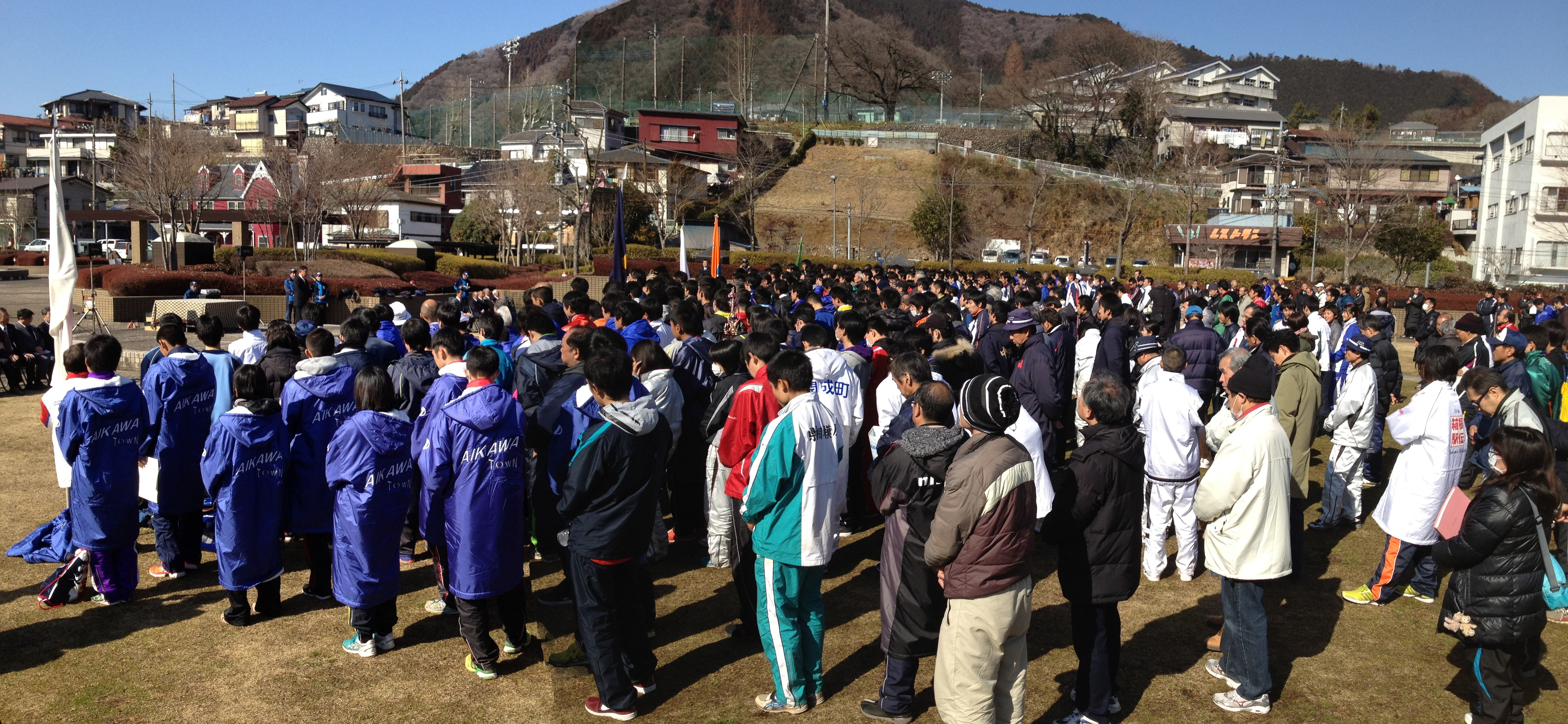
Runners gather at the finish line at Lake Sagami State Park for speeches and awards. Cooperative compliance with such ceremony is a hallmark of Japanese events.

=== Kanagawa Ekiden ===
The Kanagawa Ekiden, held on the second Sunday of February, is an inter-city competition. Teams represent cites or towns, and are composed of a mixture of junior high, high school and open/collegiate runners. Junior high The 2012 competition is the 66th annual meet. Since 2003, the course has been a 51.5 kilometer race (in seven stages) from Hadano City's Chuo Sports Park (秦野市中央運動公園) to Lake Sagami State Park (県立相模湖公園). Hadano city is not far from the US Atsugi Naval Air Facility. Lake Sagami is west of Hachioji and Takao. Sagamiko Station is one stop beyond Takao, with 2 or 3 local trains per hour connecting. The Sagamiko State Park is a ten-minute walk from the station.

The race starts at 9:00 and runners will start appearing at Sagamiko State Park shortly after 11:30.

The teams for this race are mostly, but not entirely, students. Though it is a competition between communities, participation is not open to the general running public. The race format places junior high boys in the first leg (3.0 km) and junior high or high school girls in the 4th leg (2.7 km). The other 5 legs are longer, usually run by males, and with no age restrictions.

=== Nissan Stadium (Kanagawa) Ekiden ===
On the third Saturday of February (February 18, 2012 – the 5th annual race) Nissan Stadium is the host of an ekiden. A 22.2 km 4 stage relay (8.2～4.7～4.7～4.6) for junior high age and up, and a 14.3 km 4 stage "Enjoy" relay (5.1～3.1～3.1～3.0) for elementary and up. Registration closes early-mid January; limit 500 teams each category.

=== Tamagawa Riverside Ekiden ===
Kawasaki City hosts the Tamagawa Riverside Ekiden in Kawasaki on the third Sunday of March (March 18, 2012). It runs along the Tamagawa, or the Tama River. The competition is limited to 1350 teams, and registration is closed by the first of February.

Competition is divided into three categories: family/kids (2 km～1 km～1 km～2 km), short for junior high and above (3 km～3 km～2 km～1 km), and long for high school and above (10 km～5 km～3 km～3 km～5 km). Mixed teams are permitted and masters (40+) teams can run the long course.

=== Tama-ko (Tokyo) Ekiden ===
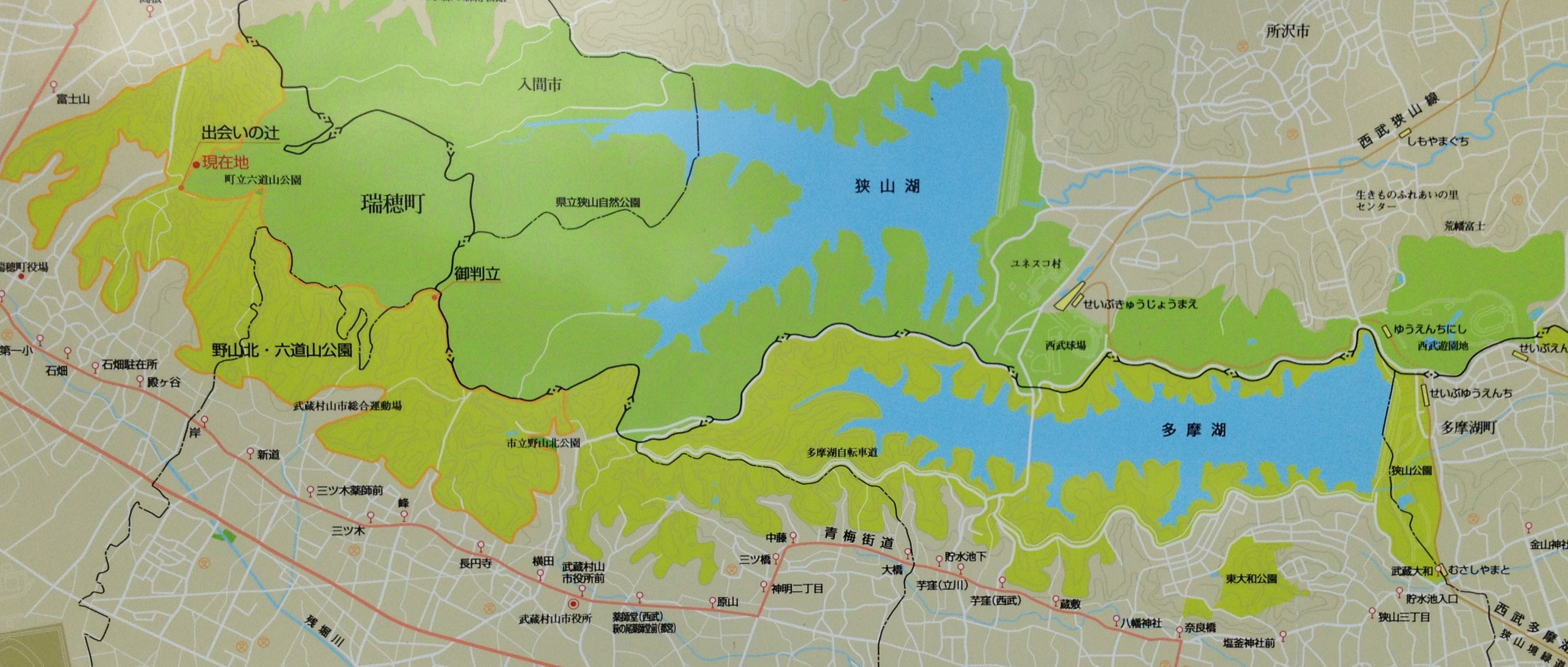
Tama-ko is the lower of two man-made lakes west of Tokorozawa and partially within Higashi Yamato City.

The Tama-ko Ekiden near Lake Tama on the Lake Tama Bicycle Trail is an example of a citizen's ekiden, hosted by the city of Higashi Yamato in western Tokyo, south of the lake.

The Tama-ko Ekiden has two versions. The men's open and high school boys' (may include girl members) teams run a combined 4-stage relay of 28.968 km around Lake Tama. The remaining contestants of a wide assortment of categories run a 4-stage race of 9.628 km within the confines of Sayama Koen park.

The race is held on Vernal Equinox – 春分の日, which in 2012 is on Tuesday, March 20. It is a national holiday in Japan. Registration typically ends January 31; there is a limit of 300 teams. In 2009, over 240 4-person teams competed, representing all ages.

The race of 2012 is the 22nd annual event. For many of the first 20 years, the reconstruction of the dam forming Lake Tama forced the event organizers to eliminate the round-the-lake format and use local streets instead of the park.

=== Tokyo Ekiden Carnival ===
The Ekiden Carnival, held in early May (May 8, 2011 – registration closed April 11), is conducted along the Arakawa River Cycling Road.

There are 3 courses: (10 km～5 km～3 km～5 km)(5 km～5 km～5 km～5 km) and (5 km～3 km～1 km～3 km).

=== Yokota (Tokyo) Ekiden ===
This ekiden is hosted by the American forces at their facilities on the western side of Tokyo. The race is open to everyone but is limited to 1000 teams; 4 members each run 5k. The event on June 6, 2009 is the 25th annual ekiden. The host organization is Yokota Striders.

== In other regions ==
=== Kyushu Isshu Ekiden – Grand Tour Kyushu ===
The Prince Takamatsu Cup Nishinippon Round-Kyūshū Ekiden, held annually from 1951 to 2013, followed a 72-stage, 1056.6 km course in Kyūshū. The race was sponsored by the Nishi Nippon Shimbun (newspaper) of Fukuoka. The race began in Nagasaki and consisted of one loop of the coast of Japan's southernmost main island of Kyushu, heading south, turning and heading north through Miyazaki, and ending in Fukuoka. The race was held for the last time in 2013 due to declining TV revenues and the event's extreme length.

== Outside Japan ==
=== Hawaii ===
Honolulu Rainbow EKIDEN: The Honolulu Rainbow EKIDEN began on March 3, 2013 as Hawaii's first "Ekiden" relay race for amateur runners. The event features teams consisting of 3 to 5 runners who will compete in a long distance relay race. Each runner will run from Kapiolani Park to Diamond Head and return to Kapiolani Park where they will hand over a sash (ribbon rei) to the next runner who will run the same course. Each lap is approx 5 km (3.1 miles).

Honolulu Ekiden & Music Festival: The first annual Honolulu Ekiden & Music Festival was held on May 12, 2013. Certified by the USATF the course consists of six different sections; the course totals 42.195 km/26 miles . Starting at the base of Diamond Head at Kapiolani Park, the course progresses eastward along the coast and winds past Hanauma Bay with a turnaround point at Sandy Beach Park. A maximum number of six (6) runners may participate on a team. For teams with less than six members, a runner or runners may run more than one section consecutively. Individual runners are also welcome to participate.

=== Guam ===
Guam Ko'Ko' Road Race – Ekiden Relay: The Guam Ko'ko' Race is the island's elite ekiden relay and half-marathon, so named to raise awareness of the plight of Guam's territorial bird, the Guam rail or ko'ko'.

=== Belgium ===
Brussels Ekiden: (for sponsorship reasons named Acerta Brussels Ekiden and later Adecco Brussels Ekiden) has been taking place in the Belgian capital since 2004. Over 1,400 teams and 8,000 runners participated in 2017.

=== New Zealand ===
Rotorua Ekiden: 42.2 km course basically following the Rotorua Marathon course around Lake Rotorua. Currently on its 12th Edition on 10 October 2015.

=== Australia ===
Anglesea Ekiden: Part of Athletics Victoria cross country season, this Ekiden takes place on Victoria's Surf Coast in Angelsea. The inaugural edition takes place on 15 August 2015.

O'Keefe Marathon Ekiden Relay. Part of the O'Keefe Marathon event, this Ekiden follows the historic O'Keefe Rail Trail between Bendigo and Heathcote in the state of Victoria. The inaugural event took place on the 1st May 2016.

=== Canada ===
The Longest Day Ekiden Relay Race: 42.2 km course which takes place in Toronto, since 2013.

=== Singapore ===
Mizuno Ekiden

Organised by Mizuno Singapore, Mizuno Corporation's regional headquarters for Asia Pacific, it is the first dedicated ekiden race in Singapore with no individual runner categories. The race is also Japanese themed with a matsuri (Japanese festival) race village at the finish line.

=== United States ===
1918 Boston Marathon Relay: The 1918 Boston Marathon was cancelled because of World War I. A ten-stage ekiden relay, with runners doing approximately 4 km (2.5 miles) each, was held instead. Camp Devens won the ekiden at 2:24:53.

=== United Kingdom ===
The inaugural FT Nikkei UK Ekiden for British university teams in partnership with corporate sponsor teams from both the UK and Japan took place on 24 June 2024. The inaugural race coincided with a high-profile visit to the UK by Japanese Emperor Naruhito and Empress Masako. The 2024 UK Ekiden course was a 76 mile/123 km route from Oxford to Windsor mainly utilizing sections of the Thames Path. The race consisted of 10 runners per team and for the three university teams participating, an equal number of women and men athletes. The inaugural race was won by the University of Oxford. In the second edition of the event held on 20 June 2025, 15 British university teams participated alongside corporate sponsor teams and one guest team from Ritsumeikan University, Japan. The course for the second edition of the event was a 72 mile/115 km circuit along the Thames Path from Windsor to Reading, returning to a finish at Windsor. The second edition of the event was won by the Ritsumeikan University team.

== See also ==
- Relay race
- Cross country running
- IAAF World Road Relay Championships
- Middle distance track event
- Nike Team Nationals
- List of world records in athletics
