= All-Japan Corporate Ekiden Championships =

The corporate ekiden competition is a series of races contested between Japan's corporate (business) running teams. The championships are officially the 全日本実業団対抗駅伝競走大会 (All-Japan Corporate Team Ekiden Championships)). The structure involves regional qualifying races and a national championship for women and for men.

== Women's Championship ==
The All-Japan Women’s Corporate (Jitsugyodan) Ekiden Championship is held in mid December after 3 regional qualifying ekiden (2011 summary) events, narrowing the field to 24 to 27 teams, although new qualification standards in 2011 increased the field to 33 teams. In addition to teams coming from the East Japan qualifying meet, there are teams from the Central Japan and Western Japan qualifying meets.

== Men's Championship ==
The All-Japan Men's Corporate Ekiden Championship, also called the New Year Ekiden, takes place in Japan's Gunma Prefecture on 1 January.

== Qualification Structure ==
Teams gain qualification into the final ekiden race through a series of preliminaries which are principally conducted on a district-by-district basis. The Eastern Japan Corporate Ekiden Championship qualifies men's and women's teams. Two other qualifying meets for the women are held for Central Japan and Western Japan, (women's divisions detailed in Japanese). The Western Japan women's qualifying race (6 stages, 42.195 km, 31st race on October 23, 2011) begins in Munakata, Fukuoka; website.

The men have a slightly different pattern (men's divisions detailed in Japanese). One of the men's qualifying races is the Kyushu men's qualifying race (7 stages, 78.8 km, 48th on November 23, 2011), which begins in Fukuoka City and ends in Kita Kyushu city; 2010 video. Other regionals include Kansai Jitsugyodan Ekiden (2010 - 53rd, held in Tabe), Chubu Jitsugyodan Ekiden (2010 - 50th, held in Gero, Gifu), Hokuriku Jitsugyodan Ekiden (2010 - 40th, held in Gero, Gifu), and Chugoku Jitsugyodan Ekiden (2010 - 49th, held in Sera, Hiroshima).

== Qualification Round - Eastern Japan Corporate Ekiden Championships ==
Konosu City, Saitama Prefecture, has hosted for several years the men's and women's Eastern Japan Corporate (Jitsugyodan) Ekiden Championships (2011 meet website). The meet site is Kumagaya Sports Culture Park (熊谷スポーツ文化公園陸上競技). This meet is a regional qualifier for the December women's and January 1 men's national championships. The women run a 6-stage 42.195 kilometer (full marathon) race and the men run a 7-stage 77.5 km race. The 2011 race was the meet's 22nd women's championship and the men's 52nd. 2011 race highlights in English; Japanese television website.

=== Men ===
Men's Eastern Japan Corporate Ekiden Championship (75.5 km; top 13 qualify for nationals)
	First Place	Second Place	Third Place	Fourth Place	Fifth Place	Sixth Place	Seventh Place	Eight Place	Ninth Place	Tenth Place	EleventhPlace	Twelfth Place	Thirteenth Place
2011 52nd Cup	Nissin Shokuhin; 3:44:56	Konica Minolta; 3:45:53	Kanebo; 3:46:43	Honda; 3:47:19	Fujitsu; 3:47:53	Yakult; 3:48:25	JR Higashi Nihon; 3:48:49	Komori Corp. 3:49:10	Subaru; 3:49:26	Hitachi Cable; 3:51:23	SDF Academy; 3:54:34	Tokyo Police; 3:54:52	Press Kogyo; 3:56:36

Men's Eastern Japan Corporate Ekiden Championship Stage Winners
	First stage 11.6 km	Second stage 15.3 km	Third stage 9.2 km	Fourth stage 9.9 km	Fifth stage 7.4 km	Sixth stage 10.6 km	Seventh stage 13.5 km
2011 52nd Cup	Yuki Sato; Team Nissin Shokuhin; 33:00 CR	Tsuyoshi Ugachi; Team Konica Minolta; 44:28 CR	Josephat Ndambiri; Team Komori Corp. 25:20 CR	Masato Kihara; Team Kanebo; 28:43 CR	Yoshihiro Wakamatsu; Team Nissin Shokuhin; 21:19 CR	Yuki Nakamura; Team Kanebo; 30:41	Masakazu Fujiwara; Team Honda; 39:31

=== Women ===
Women's Eastern Japan Corporate Ekiden Championship (24.195 km; from 2011 all teams under 2:30.00 qualify for national championships)
	First Place	Second Place	Third Place	Fourth Place	Fifth Place	Sixth Place	Seventh Place	Eight Place	Ninth Place	Tenth Place	Eleventh Place	Twelfth Place
2011 22nd Cup	Daiichi Seimei; 2:17:21	Sekisui Kagaku; 2:17:24	Universal Entertainment; 2:17:56	Panasonic; 2:18:07	Starts; 2:19:00	Hokuren; 2:19:51	Mitsui Sumitomo Kaijo; 2:20:12	Shiseido; 2:20:17	Nihon ChemiCon; 2:20:25	Yamada Denki; 2:21:21	Shimamura; 2:21:32	Hitachi; 2:23:49

Women's Eastern Japan Corporate Ekiden Championship Stage Winners (CR = Course record)
	First stage 6.795 km	Second stage 3.1 km	Third stage 12.2 km	Fourth stage 3.8 km	Fifth stage 10.0 km	Sixth stage 6.3 km
2011 22nd Cup	Yurie Doi; Team Starts; 21:44	Grace Kimanzi; Kenya/Team Starts; 9:28 CR	Misaki Katsumata; Team Daiichi Seimei; 39:07 CR	Miku Yamamoto; Team Sekisui Kagaku; 11:58 CR	Asami Kato; Team Panasonic; 32:49	Yoshimi Ozaki; Team Daiichi Seimei; 20:41 CR

== Qualification Round - Western Japan Corporate Ekiden Championships ==
The Western Japan women's qualifying race (6 stages, 42.195 km) begins in Munakata, Fukuoka; website. The 31st annual race was held on October 23, 2011.
