= All-Japan Interprefectural Ekiden Championships =

The All-Japan Interprefectural Ekiden Championships are two annual ekiden (road running relay) competitions between the 47 Prefectures of Japan. The championships are both held in January and are divided by gender. The Empress Cup - Interprefectural Women's Ekiden is held in Kyoto on the third Sunday in January. The Interprefectural Men's Ekiden is held in Hiroshima in recent years on the fourth Sunday of January.

== Women's Championship ==
The Empress Cup - Interprefectural Women's Ekiden Championship is held in Kyoto on the third Sunday in January. The 2012 running marks the 30th annual event. Forty seven teams from the 47 prefectures of Japan compete. The course is the same as the course for the high school boys national ekiden race held on the third Sunday of December, except that the women's relay has 9 stages (rather than 7) over the 42.195 kilometers. The stages are 6k 4k 3k 4k 4.0175k 4.0875k 4k 3k and 10k. The two 3k stages are reserved for junior high athletes and generally high school athletes run the 5 stages that are 4k or just over 4k. Collegiate and open runners take the 6k and 10k stages. The mixed-age squads maintain a rapid pace. In 2009 the first 10 teams finished under 2 hours and 20 minutes, and 12 teams broke 2:20 in 2012. In 2009, the team from Kyoto took its 13th championship, and as of that year, in the ekiden's 20 years Kyoto has only twice placed outside the top 6. Okayama took its first ever title in 2010, Kyoto reclaimed it in 2011, and in 2012 Kyoto finished second, a minute back from the winning team from neighboring Osaka.

Women's ekiden top three
Edition	First Place	Second Place	Third Place
2009 27th Cup	Kyoto; 2:15:39; 5th_consecutive	Okayama; 2:17:03	Hyogo; 2:17:42
2010 28th Cup	Okayama; 2:16:24 first-ever title	Chiba; 2:16:39	Kyoto; 2:17:12
2011 29th Cup	Kyoto; 2:17:16	Okayama; 2:18:07	Fukuoka; 2:19:00
2012 30th Cup	Osaka; 2:16:37	Kyoto; 2:17:33	Chiba; 2:17:49

- Note: Jr.HS = Junior High School, H.S.= High School

Top stage performers
Edition	1st (6 km Open)	2nd (4 km HS/Open)	3rd (3 km Jr.HS)	4th (4 km HS/Open)	5th (4.1075 km HS/Open)	6th (4.0875 km HS/Open)	7th (4 km HS)	8th (3 km Jr.HS)	9th (10 km Open)
2009	Yurika Nakamura & Ryoko Kisaki; Okayama & Kyoto: 19:14	Yuriko Kobayashi; Hyogo - 12:07 new stage record	Haruka Kyuma; Kyoto - 9:21	Risa Shigetomo; Okayama - 12:50	Ikumi Natsuhara; Kyoto -13:11	Ai Kuboki; Okayama - 12:54	Aya Ito; Kyoto - 12:26	Moe Kyuma; Kyoto - 9:41 > new stage record	Hitomi Niiya; Chiba - 32:31
January 17, 2010	Kasumi Nishihara; Kyoto - 19:11	Kaori Urata; Okayama - 12:31	Tomoka Kimura; Shizuoka - 9:22	Ryoko Kisaki; Osaka - 12:50	Katsuki Suga; Okayama - 13:02	Mahiro Akamatsu; Okayama - 12:42 new stage record	Minami Nakaarai; Hyogo - 12:24	Yume Tanaka; Shizuoka - 9:46	Kayoko Fukushi; Aomori - 31:03
January 16, 2011	Hanae Tanaka; Fukuoka; Ritsumeikan Univ. - 19:41	Tomoka Kimura; Fukuoka; Chikushi Jyogakuen H.S. - 12:22	Hanami Sekine; Tokyo; Kanai Jr.H.S. - 9:21	Yuriko Kobayashi; Hyogo; Team Toyota Jidoshoki - 12:41 new stage record	Mutsumi Ikeda & Erina Maki; Hyogo & Kyoto; Suma Gakuen H.S. & Ritsumeikan Uji H.S. - 13:26	Nanako Kanno; Kyoto; Ritsumeikan Uji H.S. - 12:39 new stage record	Ayano Ikeuchi; Kyoto; Ritsumeikan Uji H.S. - 12:35	Ayaka Nakagawa; Saitama; Asaka Dai-San Jr.H.S. - 10:02	Kayoko Fukushi; Kyoto; Team Wacoal - 31:53
January 15, 2012	Ryoko Kizaki; Osaka; Team Daihatsu - 19:21	Yuka Ando; Aichi; Toyokawa H.S. - 12:26	Ayaka Nakagawa; Saitama; Asaka #3 Jr. H.S. - 9:17	Risa Takenaka; Shiga; Ritsumeikan Univ. - 12:48	Nanami Aoki; Kyoto; Ritsumeikan Uji H.S. - 12:57	Mika Kobayashi; Hyogo; Suma Gakuen H.S. - 12:58	Risa Yokoe; Hyogo; Suma Gakuen H.S. - 12:33	Kokoro Sawairi; Shizuoka; Fujioka Jr. H.S. - 9:53	Hitomi Niiya; Chiba; Sakura A.C. - 32:06

== Men's Championship ==
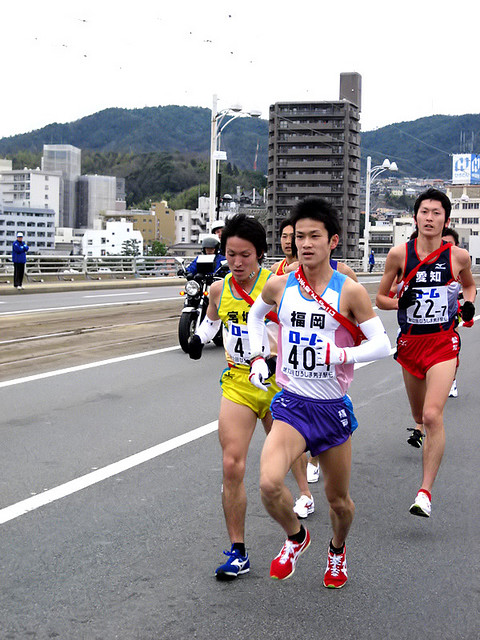
Runners in 2007 meeting 7th Leg.

In the men's All-Japan Interprefectural Ekiden Championship, 7 runners run 48 kilometers in stages of 7k 3k 8.5k 5k 8.5k 3k and 13k. In both races, each team is composed of runners selected to represent one prefecture, a total of 47 teams in each race. The majority of the team members are high school and junior high school elite runners. Junior high runners are assigned to the two 3k stages and high school runners are assigned to the 7k, the 5k and 8.5k stages. Open runners are placed in the remaining 8.5k stage and the 13k stage. Despite the youth, the first 7 men's teams in 2009 finished under 2 hours and 21 minutes (48k), the equivalent of 14:40 5k pace or 8:48 3k pace. In 2009 the team from Nagano took its 5th title in 6 years.

Men's ekiden top three
Edition	1st	2nd	3rd
2009 14th Annual	Nagano - 2:18:43; Course Record; 5th title in 6 years	Hyogo - 2:20:03	Miyazaki - 2:20:07
2010 15th Annual	Hyogo - 2:20:02	Fukushima - 2:20:05	Saitama - 2:20:20
2011 16th Annual	Tochigi - 2:19:31; First ever Title	Nagano - 2:20:02	Hiroshima - 2:20:37
2012 17th Annual			
2013 18th	Hyogo - 2:19:51	Tokyo - 2:19:56	Aichi - 2:20:35

- Note: Jr HS = Junior High School, HS= High School

Men's Top stage performers
Edition	1st (7 km HS)	2nd (3 km Jr HS)	3rd (8.5 km Open)	4th (5 km HS)	5th (8.5 km HS)	6th (3 km Jr HS)	7th (13 km Open)
2009	Shodai Hattori; Saitama - 20:10	Yuta Katsumata; Shizuoka - 8:30 new stage record	Yu Mitsuya; Fukuoka - 23:49	Shota Hiraga; Nagano - 14:28	Akinobu Murasawa; Nagano - 23:55 new stage record	Hideshi Ikegami; Kyoto - 8:51	Naoki Okamoto; Hiroshima - 37:55
January 24, 2010	Shota Hattori; Saitama - 20:12	Koki Maeda; Fukuoka - 8:39	Tomoya Onishi; Gifu - 24:16	Hirotaka Tamura; Aomori - 14:10 new stage record	Keita Shitara; Saitama - 24:38	Taiga Machizawa; Chiba - 8:31 new stage record	Yuki Sato; Nagano - 37:12
January 23, 2011	Genki Yagisawa; Tochigi/Nasu Takuyo H.S. - 20:07	Kengo Takamori; Chiba/Abiko Jr.H.S. - 8:31	Akinobu Murasawa; Nagano/Tokai Univ. - 23:48	Keita Shioya; Tochigi/Nasu Takuyo H.S. - 14:25	Kenta Murayama; Miyagi/Meisei H.S. - 24:33	Yuichi Yasui; Chiba/Tokiwadaira Jr.H.S. - 8:40	Yusuke Takabayashi; Mie/Team Toyota - 37:25
January 22, 2012							
2013	Keisuke Nakatani (Hyogo) 19:56	Shiki Shinsako (Hiroshima) 8:29	Suguru Osako (Tokyo) 23:39	Yuhi Akiyama (Hyogo) 14:07	Rintaro Takeda (Tokyo) 24:50	Mashide Saito (Saitama) 8:52	Keigo Yano (Nagano) 37:54
