= Mizuno Ekiden =

Mizuno Ekiden is an annual marathon race in Singapore that incorporates the ekiden concept, a Japanese long-distance relay race concept. Organised by Mizuno Singapore, Mizuno Corporation's regional headquarters for Asia Pacific, it is the first dedicated ekiden race in Singapore with no individual runner categories. The race is also Japanese themed with a matsuri (Japanese festival) race village at the finish line. The race village features Japanese cultural performances, booths selling Japanese cuisine and traditional games.

== Race mechanics ==
Runners race in teams of four, each covering a quarter of the marathon distance. During the race, runners wear the traditional tasuki sash. After the first runner finishes his leg of the race, he enters the transition area where his teammates are waiting, and passes on the sash to the next runner in his team. This repeats until the fourth runner finishes his leg. There are three categories: 42.195 km Open Category, 21.1 km Open Category, and 21.1 km Corporate Category.

== Races ==
=== 2015 ===
Mizuno Ekiden's inaugural race was held on 18 July 2015 at The Meadow, Gardens by the Bay. Infinitus was the appointed events organiser.

=== 2016 ===
The 2016 race took place on 16 July, 4pm at The Promontory @ Marina Bay.

=== 2017 ===
The third edition of Mizuno Ekiden took place on 19 August, 4pm at The Promontory @ Marina Bay. Close to 4,000 runners participated in the race, which flagged off at 4.30pm. In the 21.1 km corporate category, a team from the Singapore Prison Service, consisting of Cleeve Mu, Ramesh Palaniandy, Yew Meng Tan and Zainul Arrifin came out tops, completing the race in 1hr 24min to walk away with over $2,000 worth of cash and vouchers, and retained their title for the second year running. Mark Calton, Takuya Sawada, Creighton Connolly, Yuta Suda won the 42.195 km open category, clocking in at 2hr 36min while team F1 Runners won the 21.1 km open category (1 hr 20min).

=== 2020 ===
In response to COVID-19 restrictions, the inaugural Mizuno Ekiden Singapore Online Race was held in 2020, organized by Mizuno in partnership with Spacebib, a social race platform. This marked the first-ever virtual edition of the event.
