= River to River Relay =

Relay race in Illinois, United States

- Date: April 26, 2025
- Location: Wolf Creek, Illinois to Golconda, Illinois, United States
- Event type: Road
- Distance: 80 miles
- Established: 1987
- Website: http://rrr.olm.net/index.html

The River to River Relay is a long distance relay race in which teams of runners run from the Mississippi River to the Ohio River, covering a distance of 80 miles. Over 2000 runners take part in the race every year. River to River is a race of friendly competition that experienced to novice runners enjoy running. The race takes place in the southern part of Illinois beginning near Wolf Lake, Illinois and ending in Golconda, Illinois. The River to River Relay, the first of which was organized in 1987 with Gordon Pitz as the Race Director, is held annually sometime in April to not coincide with Easter weekend.

The race is run across the southern tip of Illinois. Runners form teams that race against each other in 9 major divisions. Registration is usually in October of each year and the race field has been known to fill up in as little as 5 minutes on registration day. After the race, massage tables are ready for runners to use, a band plays, food stands are set up, and awards are given out.

== Course ==
The 80 mile course begins near Wolf Lake, IL, in La Rue Pine Hills, and ends in Golconda, IL. The course runs across the very southern tip of Illinois. The first leg of the race goes through the Shawnee National Forest. The rest of the race is run on country roads and highways. The most difficult leg of the race is generally considered to be section 22. This leg of the race is covered by Runner 6. There are many places throughout the race where residents will cheer on runners as they pass by their homes.

The race is operated by the River to River Runners Club of Southern Illinois. The current Race Director is Kyle Orso and there is an organizing committee plus over 200 volunteers that help throughout the course on race day. The volunteers perform numerous functions including staffing water stations set up, directing traffic, and monitoring exchanges.

== Logistics ==
Teams must submit applications to join the race in October. Though there are over 350 teams that will apply, only 250 are accepted into the race. This limit is imposed due to the logistics of the course. Each team must come up with a creative name by which to call themselves. Teams have until the week prior to the race to change any roster information. Teams are seeded according to prospective times. These times are based on the sum of each member's 5k time. Faster teams start the race earlier. The first runners leave at 6:15 AM and there are starts every thirty minutes until 8:45 AM.

Teams are allowed to have only one vehicle with exceptions made for the fastest teams who may use two if they are worried about their runner making to the next exchange zone before the vehicle arrives due to traffic. The vehicle is used to transport the seven runners who are not currently running to the next exchange zone. There are 23 exchange zones. The runners must run with a baton. The baton must be passed to the next runner within the exchange zone.

"The relay is the equivalent of three hard races in one day. Runners recover as best they can while other team members take a turn, encountering mud, hills, dust, hills, sweat, hills... They learn to welcome the cramped quarters of a vehicle occupied by seven other muddy, dusty, sweaty, tired people, and wonder why they were picked to tackle the terrible hill on section 22. The euphoria on reaching the finish line at the Ohio River, running in together as a team, resolves all the doubt."

Though the rules of the race are taken seriously, the race is primarily meant to be recreational. Some participants run in costumes corresponding to their team names. Vehicles cheer on runners as they pass them on their way to the next exchange zone. Overall, the competition is characterized by friendly competition.

== Teams ==
Teams consist of eight runners. The runners must run in a fixed sequence. Each runner runs three legs of the race throughout the course of the day. For example, Runner 1 will run legs 1, 9, and 17. Each leg of the race is of differing difficulty and distance.

If a runner is unable to run his or her leg, the team has two options:

1. The previous runner in sequence must continue running through the exchange and run the absent runner's leg.
2. The next runner in the sequence must take over the absent runner's leg and continue running through his or her leg.

Team Divisions

There are 9 major Team Divisions that each team can qualify for in order to receive an award a team must belong to a division. There is friendly competition throughout the day within each division.

== Post Race ==
After the grueling race, there are massage tables set up with therapists ready to work out any kinks acquired during the race. Blue grass music is provided outside of the Pope County Courthouse. Pope County High School offers showers for the runners to use after the race. There are also stands set up at the finish selling various types of food.

After the finish line has closed, awards are presented. One award is given for every five teams with a maximum of three awards given per division. Awards are not substantial; each team member gets a plaque and the team captain receives a silver platter.
