= All-Japan Women's Corporate Ekiden Championships =

Queen's Ekiden Annual event (1983)

The All-Japan Women’s Corporate (Jitsugyodan) Ekiden Championship, also known as Queen´s Ekiden (クイーンズ駅伝) is held in mid December. The 6 stage 42.195 kilometer ekiden race had been held in Gifu Prefecture from 1983 to 2010. For the December 18, 2011 race, the site was moved to Sendai.

== All-Japan Corporate Ekiden Championships ==
The All-Japan Corporate Ekiden Championships is a series of races contested between Japan's corporate (business) running teams. The structure involves regional qualifying races and a national championship for women and for men. The All-Japan Men's Corporate Ekiden Championship, also called the New Year Ekiden takes place in Japan's Gunma Prefecture on 1 January.

== Qualification Structure ==
Teams for the women's championship gain qualification into the final ekiden race through a series of 3 preliminaries (2011 summary). The Eastern Japan Corporate Ekiden Championship qualifies men's and women's teams. Two other qualifying meets for the women are held for Central Japan and Western Japan, (women's divisions detailed in Japanese). The Western Japan women's qualifying race (6 stages, 42.195 km, 31st race on October 23, 2011) begins in Munakata, Fukuoka; website. After the 3 regional qualifying ekiden events, the field is typically narrowed to 24 to 27 teams, although new qualification standards in 2011 increased the field to include any corporate team that could break the 2:30 mark in one of the regional qualifier meets. Further details and results of the qualification races can be found at All-Japan Corporate Ekiden Championships.

The men have a slightly different pattern (men's divisions detailed in Japanese). One of the men's qualifying races is the Kyushu men's qualifying race (7 stages, 78.8 km, 48th on November 23, 2011), which begins in Fukuoka City and ends in Kita Kyushu city; 2010 video. Other regionals include Kansai Jitsugyodan Ekiden (2010 - 53rd, held in Tabe), Chubu Jitsugyodan Ekiden (2010 - 50th, held in Gero, Gifu), Hokuriku Jitsugyodan Ekiden (2010 - 40th, held in Gero, Gifu), and Chugoku Jitsugyodan Ekiden (2010 - 49th, held in Sera, Hiroshima).

== Championship Ekiden Race ==
The 33 women's teams that qualified for the championship race in mid December, 2011, ran on the new Sendai course. One of the characteristics of the new course is its uphill nature (video map) with a prevailing headwind. TBS broadcast homepage, with results (Japanese). English 2008 Results; English 2009 Results; English 2010 Results; English 2011 race preview; English 2011 post race summary.

Like the men's championship race, participation of foreign team-members is restricted to the shortest stage, in this case the 3.6 km fourth stage; the same rule applied to the second stage on the Gifu course.

=== Results ===
All-Japan Women's Corporate Ekiden Championship (42.195 km)
	First Place	Second Place	Third Place	Fourth Place	Fifth Place	Sixth Place	Seventh Place	Eight Place	Ninth Place	Tenth Place
2009 - 26th Gifu	Mitsui Sumitomo Kaijo - 2:15:27	Tenmaya - 2:15:38	Daiichi Seimei - 2:16:27	Shiseido - 2:16:43	Wacoal - 2:16:58	Denso - 2:17:16	Daihatsu; 2:17:35	Hokuren - 2:17:37	Toyota Jidoshoki - 2:17:57	Nihon Chemicon - 2:18:40
2010 - 27th Gifu, Last running	Tenmaya; 2:14:35	Daiichi Seimei; 2:15:36	Toyota Jidoshoki; 2:15:46	Universal Entertainment; 2:16:17	Mitsui Sumitomo Kaijo; 2:16:23	Shiseido; 2:16:48	Daihatsu; 2:16:49	Wacoal; 2:16:54	Denso; 2:17:04	Sekisui Kagaku; 2:17:17
2011 - 28th Sendai, First running	Daiichi Seimei; 2:17:17	Panasonic; 2:18:15	Sekisui Kagaku; 2:18:25	Tenmaya; 2:18:32	Denso; 2:18:40	Wacoal; 2:18:44	Daihatsu; 2:18:55	Kyocera; 2:19:15	Starts; 2:19:40	Universal Entertainment; 2:19:41

All-Japan Women's Corporate Ekiden Championship Stage Winners
	First stage 6.6 km	Second stage 3.3 km	Third stage 10.0 km	Fourth stage 4.1 km	Fifth stage 11.6 km	Sixth stage 6.595 km
2009 - 26th Gifu Course	Aya Isomine; Team Shiseido; 20:35	Doricah Obare; Team Hitachi; 10:02 new stage record	Kayoko Fukushi; Team Wacoal; 31:02 new stage record	Yuka Kakimi; Team Daiichi Seimei; 12:46	Yukiko Akaba; Team Hokuren; 37:00	Kaori Urata; Team Tenmaya; 21:01
2010 - 27th Gifu Course	Mizuho Nasukawa; Team Univ. Ent. 20:46	Ann Karindi; Team Toyota Jidoshokki; 9:56	Kayoko Fukushi; Team Wacoal; 31:26	Yuka Kakimi; Team Daiichi Seimei; 12:43	Risa Shigetomo; Team Tenmaya; 37.36	Kaori Urata; Team Tenmaya; 20:39
	First stage 7.0 km	Second stage 3.9 km	Third stage 10.9 km	Fourth stage 3.6 km	Fifth stage 10.0 km	Sixth stage 6.795 km
2011 - 28th Sendai course	Yoshimi Ozaki; Team Daiichi Seimei; 22:17	Riko Matsuzaki; Team Sekisui Kagaku; 12:17	Kayo Sugihara; Team Denso; 35:43	Felista Wanjugu; Team Univ. Ent. 11:29	Risa Shigetomo; Team Tenmaya; 32:51	Tomomi Tanaka; Team Daiichi Seimei; 21:06
