= New Year Ekiden =

Annual mens running relay in Japan

- Date: January 1st (New Year's Day)
- Location: Gunma Prefecture, Japan
- Event type: Road Relay
- Distance: Varies per checkpoint Total Distance: 100.0Km
- Primary sponsor: Yamazaki Baking and TBS
- Established: 1957 (69 years ago)
- Course records: 4h44m00s (2026); GMO Internet Group
- Website: TBS Official Page

The New Year Ekiden (ニューイヤー駅伝), (officially the 全日本実業団対抗駅伝競走大会 (All-Japan Men's Corporate Team Ekiden Championships)), is an annual men's ekiden (road running relay) over 100 kilometres which takes place in Japan's Gunma Prefecture on 1 January. The race is a national championship contested between Japan's corporate (business) running teams. There is also an annual championship race for women in Japan – the Women's Corporate Ekiden Championships. The race starts and ends in the city of Maebashi and the course passes through the major cities within the prefecture, including Takasaki, Isesaki, Ota and Kiryu. The relay is divided into seven legs of varying lengths that alternate on a frequent basis. The 2012 race was divided as follows: 12.3 km, 8.3 km, 13.6 km, 22 km, 15.8 km, 12.5 km and 15.5 km.

Historically, the race was conducted around Kashiko Island in Mie Prefecture at its inauguration in 1957. Over the first 30 years of the competition's life it expanded from an 83 km race to a 99 km one. The 31st edition in 1986 was held around Hikone and the Shiga Prefecture, but the race moved again the following year to its current location of Gunma. At this point the distance was reduced to around 85 km and the full 100 km format was introduced at the 2001 ekiden. The first competition featured 14 corporate running teams and this number steadily increased when the entry was limited to around 40 teams. The 50th edition in 2006 proved to be an except in this respect, as 43 teams were allowed entry in respect of the five people killed during the East Japan Railway derailment accident on 25 December 2005.

The New Year Ekiden is part of the two ekiden race events that celebrate the new year, the other one being the Hakone Ekiden on January 2 and 3.

The competition has been broadcast on Tokyo Broadcasting System Television every year since 1988 and there is also coverage on TBS Radio. The main commercial sponsor of the relay race is Yamazaki Baking. It has been claimed that the high TV viewing figures of this meet makes it the central motivating event in the annual calendar for professional runners in Japan.

== Participation ==
Teams gain qualification into the final ekiden race through a series of preliminaries which are principally conducted on a regional basis. Some qualifying competitions are for both men and women while others are single-sex qualifiers. The Eastern Japan Corporate Ekiden Championship qualifies men's and women's teams. The Kyushu men's qualifying race (Fukuoka City to Kita Kyushu city) is held in November. and others include the Kansai Jitsugyodan Ekiden in Tabe, the Chubu and Hokuriku Jitsugyodan Ekidens in Gero, and the Chugoku Jitsugyodan Ekiden in Sera, Hiroshima.

Although the majority of the competing athletes are Japanese, a limited number of foreign runners are allowed to participate. These runners are mostly Kenyan immigrants and are often the best runners on the team. Companies are permitted foreign representatives on just one of the seven legs. Past Kenyans that have competed at the New Year Ekiden include Martin Mathathi, Josephat Ndambiri and Samuel Wanjiru. Ethiopia's Ibrahim Jeylan is another prominent East African to have competed.

== Past results ==
Edition	Date	Location	Distance	Teams	1st (h:m:s)	2nd (h:m:s)	3rd (h:m:s)	Notes
1st	1957 3 March	Ise	83.5km	14	Yawata Iron & Steel (4:27:58)	Asahi Kasei Kasei (4:32:21)	Japan National Railway (4:37:11)	
2nd	1958 3 February	Ise	83.5km	15	Riccar Sewing (4:28:21)	Yawata Iron & Steel (4:33:02)	Kanebo (4:38:25)	
3rd	1959 3 January	Ise	83.5km	14	Riccar Sewing (4:27:56)	Yawata Iron & Steel (4:30:57)	Toyo Bearing (4:36:14)	
4th	1960 21 February	Ise	83.5km	15	Yawata Iron & Steel (4:30:11)	Toyo Bearing (4:31:43)	Meiji Seika (4:39:14)	
5th	1960 18 December	Ise	83.5km	17	Riccar Sewing (4:25:23)	Tokyo Express (4:30:17)	Kurashiki Rayon (4:32:17)	
6th	1961 17 December	Ise	83.6km	19	Tokyu (4:25:35)	Riccar Sewing (4:28:10)	Yawata Iron & Steel (4:28:11)	
7th	1962 16 December	Ise	83.6km	16	Yawata Iron & Steel (4:16:04)	Tokyu (4:19:27)	Kurashiki Rayon (4:22:53)	
8th	1963 15 December	Ise	83.6km	19	Tokyu (4:16:13)	Asahi Kasei (4:18:37)	Toyo (4:19:11)	
9th	1964 20 December	Ise	83.6km	18	Asahi Kasei (4:13:28)	Yawata Iron & Steel (4:14:34)	Tokyu (4:14:37)	
10th	1965 19 December	Ise	83.6km	21	Asahi Kasei (4:14:21)	Tokyu (4:15:13)	Yawata Iron & Steel (4:15:25)	
11th	1966 18 December	Ise	83.0 km	23	Asahi Kasei (4:15:44)	Kurashiki Rayon (4:16:40)	Riccar Sewing (4:17:04)	Distance reduced
12th	1967 17 December	Ise	83.0 km	26	Denden Chugoku (4:14:57)	Kurashiki Rayon (4:15:21)	Kyushu Electric Works (4:15:51)	
13th	1968 22 December	Ise	83.0 km	24	Asahi Kasei (4:11:45)	Yawata Iron & Steel (4:13:15)	Toyo Bearing (4:13:30)	
14th	1969 21 December	Ise	83.0 km	23	Toyo (4:08:11)	Asahi Kasei (4:08:23)	Denden Chugoku (4:08:55)	
15th	1970 20 December	Ise	99.4km	23	Denden Chugoku (5:00:59)	Asahi Kasei (5:02:30)	Riccar Sewing (5:02:40)	Distance extended
16th	1971 19 December	Ise	99.4km	25	Toyo (5:02:08)	Kanebo (5:03:57)	Kuraray (5:04:21)	
17th	1972 17 December	Ise	99.4km	26	Kuraray (4:58:10)	Toyo (4:58:54)	Asahi Kasei (4:59:03)	
18th	1973 16 December	Ise	99.0 km	26	Asahi Kasei (5:06:47)	Nippon Steel (5:06:53)	Toyo (5:06:54)	Distance reduced
19th	1974 15 December	Ise	99.0 km	25	Kanebo (5:01:42)	Asahi Kasei (5:05:47)	Kobe Steel (5:05:47)	
20th	1975 21 December	Ise	99.0 km	25	Asahi Kasei (4:58:48)	Kanebo (4:59:05)	Riccar Sewing (4:59:24)	
21st	1976 19 December	Ise	99.0 km	27	Kanebo (4:58:42)	Asahi Kasei (5:02:05)	Kobe Steel (5:03:35)	
22nd	1977 18 December	Ise	99.0 km	27	Kanebo (5:00:10)	Kyushu Electric Works (5:02:40)	Asahi Kasei (5:03:07)	
23rd	1978 17 December	Ise	99.0 km	27	Asahi Kasei (5:00:09)	Kanebo (5:03:35)	Nippon Steel (5:05:55)	
24th	1979 16 December	Ise	99.0 km	28	Asahi Kasei (4:57:15	Kyushu Electric Works (5:03:12)	Riccar Sewing (5:04:16)	
25th	1980 21 December	Ise	99.0 km	26	Asahi Kasei (4:56:00)	Kobe Steel (5:00:56)	Riccar Sewing (5:03:56	
26th	1981 20 December	Ise	99.0 km	28	Asahi Kasei (4:59:18)	Kanebo (5:01:38)	Riccar Sewing (5:02:06)	
27th	1982 19 December	Ise	99.0 km	28	Asahi Kasei (4:56:42)	Kanebo (4:57:07)	Kobe Steel (5:00:48)	
28th	1983 18 December	Ise	99.0 km	28	Asahi Kasei (4:57:11)	Kobe Steel (4:59:08)	Kanebo (5:00:48)	
29th	1984 16 December	Ise	99.0 km	30	S & B Foods (4:48:32)	Asahi Kasei (4:54:46)	Nissan (4:56:45)	
30th	1985 15 December	Ise	99.0 km	29	S & B Foods (4:48:32)	Asahi Kasei (4:54:46)	Nissan (4:56:45)	
31st	1986 21 December	Hikone	84.4km	30	S & B Foods (4:04:01)	Asahi Kasei (4:07:39)	Nissan (4:08:55)	Distance reduced
32nd	1988 1 January	Gunma	84.9km	27	S & B Foods (4:05:45)	Nissan (4:07:40)	Asahi Kasei (4:09:32)	Distance extended
33rd	1989 1 January	Gunma	86.3km	25	Nissan (4:14:52)	Asahi Kasei (4:16:53)	NEC HE (4:19:26)	Distance extended
34th	1990 1 January	Gunma	86.3km	24	Asahi Kasei (4:13:52)	Kyushu Electric Works (4:14:51)	Nissan (4:16:16)	
35th	1991 1 January	Gunma	86.3km	25	Asahi Kasei (4:10:04)	Nissan (4:13:20)	Honda Saitama (4:13:55)	
36th	1992 1 January	Gunma	86.3km	26	Asahi Kasei (4:08:24)	Kyudenko Corporation (4:12:24)	Yaskawa (4:13:30)	
37th	1993 1 January	Gunma	86.3km	32	Asahi Kasei (4:10:50)	Kyudenko Corporation (4:14:22)	Honda (4:15:33)	
38th	1994 1 January	Gunma	86.3km	32	Asahi Kasei (4:14:21)	Honda (4:18:22)	Kanebo (4:18:38)	
39th	1995 1 January	Gunma	86.3km	37	Asahi Kasei (4:15:02)	Kanebo (4:17:00)	S & B Foods (4:17:05)	
40th	1996 1 January	Gunma	86.3km	37	Kanebo (4:14:33)	Asahi Kasei (4:14:34)	S & B Foods (4:19:29)	
41st	1997 1 January	Gunma	86.3km	37	Asahi Kasei (4:07:54)	S & B Foods (4:07:57)	Daiei (4:12:00)	
42nd	1998 1 January	Gunma	86.3km	37	Asahi Kasei (4:06:28)	S & B Foods (4:06:43)	Daiei (4:10:07)	
43rd	1999 1 January	Gunma	86.4km	37	Asahi Kasei (4:11:34)	S & B Foods (4:12:24)	Chugoku Electric Power (4:14:54)	Distance extended
44th	2000 1 January	Gunma	86.4km	37	Fujitsu Limited (4:12:07)	Asahi Kasei (4:12:45)	NEC (4:15:37)	
45th	2001 1 January	Gunma	100.0 km	37	Konica (4:49:44)	Fujitsu Limited (4:50:59)	Chugoku Electric Power (4:53:25)	Distance extended
46th	2002 1 January	Gunma	100.0 km	37	Konica (4:45:32)	Chugoku Electric Power (4:46:21)	Nissin (4:49:38)	
47th	2003 1 January	Gunma	100.0 km	37	Konica (4:44:48)	Nissin (4:47:02)	Chugoku Electric Power (4:47:11)	
48th	2004 1 May 1	Gunma	100.0 km	37	Chugoku Electric Power (4:47:03)	Konica Minolta (4:49:05)	Nissin (4:50:35)	
49th	2005 1 January	Gunma	100.0 km	37	Konica Minolta (4:48:57)	Chugoku Electric Power (4:49:44)	Nissin (4:50:41)	
50th	2006 1 January	Gunma	100.0 km	43	Konica Minolta (4:44:54)	Chugoku Electric Power (4:45:53)	Fujitsu Limited (4:46:52)	Memorial race
51st	2007 1 January	Gunma	100.0 km	37	Chugoku Electric Power (4:47:02)	Asahi Kasei (4:47:53)	Nissin (4:48:16)	
52nd	2008 1 January	Gunma	100.0 km	37	Konica Minolta (4:46:28)	Chugoku Electric Power (4:49:45)	Honda (4:49:56)	
53rd	2009 1 January	Gunma	100.0 km	37	Fujitsu (4:51:55)	Nissin Group (4:51:56)	Asahi Kasei (4:51:56)	
54th	2010 1 January	Gunma	100.0 km	37	Nissin Group (4:50:07)	Konica Minolta (4:50:36)	Fujitsu (4:51:37)	
55th	2011 1 January	Gunma	100.0 km	37	Toyota (4:51:56)	Fujitsu (4:51:57)	Nissin Group (4:52:05)	
56th	2012 1 January	Gunma	100.0 km	37	Nissin Group (4:49:32)	Konica Minolta (4:50:52)	Asahi Kasei (4:51:16)	
57th	2013 1 January	Gunma	100.0 km	37	Konica Minolta (4:51:32)	Toyota Kyushu (4:55:24)	Honda (4:55:25)	
58th	2014 1 January	Gunma	100.0 km	37	Konica Minolta (4:53:35)	Toyota Motors Kyushu (4:54:59)	Nissin Group (4:56:48)	
59th	2015 1 January	Gunma	100.0 km	37	Toyota Motor Corp. (4:51:41)	Konica Minolta (4:53:20)	Nissin Group (4:55:00)	
60th	2016 1 January	Gunma	100.0 km	43	Toyota Motor Corp.(4:52:15)	Konica Minolta (4:52:36)	Toyota Motors Kyushu (4:53:32)	
61st	2017 1 January	Gunma	100.0 km	37	Asahi Kasei Corp. (4:49:55)	Toyota Motor Corp. (4:51:02)	Toyota Motors Kyushu (4:52:18)	
62nd	2018 1 January	Gunma	100.0 km	37	Asahi Kasei Corp. (4:52:18)	Honda (4:54:30)	Toyota Motor Corp. (4:54:39)	
63rd	2019 1 January	Gunma	100.0 km	37	Asahi Kasei Corp. (4:51:27)	MHPS (4:51:31)	Toyota Motor Corp.(4:52:34)	
64th	2020 1 January	Gunma	100.0 km	37	Asahi Kasei Corp. (4:46:07)	Toyota Motor Corp. (4:48:02)	Honda (4:49:30)	
65th	2021 1 January	Gunma	100.0 km	37	Fujitsu (4:48:52)	Toyota Motor Corp. (4:49:55)	Asahi Kasei Corp. (4:50:32)	
66th	2022 1 January	Gunma	100.0 km	37	Honda (4:51:04)	Subaru (4:52:09)	Asahi Kasei Corp. (4:52:47)	
67th	2023 1 January	Gunma	100.0 km	37	Honda (4:48:06)	Fujitsu (4:48:52)	Toyota Motor Corp. (4:50:10)	
68th	2024 1 January	Gunma	100.0 km	41	Toyota Motor Corp. (4:49:02)	Honda (4:51:11)	Asahi Kasei Corp. (4:51:27)	
69th	2025 1 January	Gunma	100.0 km	37	Asahi Kasei Corp. (4:47:32)	Honda (4:47:40)	Toyota Motor Corp. (4:47:12)	
70th	2026 1 January	Gunma	100.0 km	40	GMO Internet Group (4:44:00)	LOGISTEED (4:46:27)	Toyota Motor Corp. (4:47:12)	Course Record

== Stage records ==
Stage	Distance	Time (m:s)	Runner	Team	Year
1st	12.3 km	34:16	Martin Mathathi	Suzuki	2007
2nd	21.1 km	1:01:01	Hibiki Yoshida	Sun Bel'x	2026
3rd	15.3Km	42:53	Kotaro Shinohara	Fujitsu	2026
4th	22.0 km	1:02:51	Yuki Sato	Nissin Foods	2026
5th	15.9 km	46:00	Aoi Ota	GMO Internet Group	2026
6th	11.4 km	32:27	Yudai Shimazu	GMO Internet Group	2026
7th	15.6 km	45:23	Neo Namiki	SUBARU	2026

== In popular culture ==
- Rikuoh is a 2013 Japanese novel by Jun Ikeido that features the backstage of japanese rack & field world, Rikuoh main plot features some parts that happens during the New Year Ekiden. It has been adapted to live action drama in 2017 for TBS, featuring Koji Yakusho and Ryoma Takeuchi as protagonists.
