= Round-Kyūshū Ekiden =

Former running race in Japan

The Prince Takamatsu Cup Nishinippon Round-Kyūshū Ekiden (九州一周駅伝 Kyūshū isshū ekiden) was a running race in Japan that was held annually from 1951 to 2013.

== Race ==
Contestants from the prefectures on the island of Kyūshū, as well as from Yamaguchi and Okinawa Prefectures, gathered each November. The event was held at the Kyushu island, beginning in Nagasaki and proceeding to the cities of Sasebo, Saga, Kumamoto, Minamata, Kagoshima, Miyazaki, Nobeoka, Ōita, Kitakyushu, and finally Fukuoka. The 1064-km course consisted of 72 segments, and was the longest relay race in the world.

The winning team received the Prince Takamatsu trophy. The Nishinippon Shimbun sponsors the event.

== History ==
The organisers announced that the 2013 and 62nd edition of the race would be its last, owing to the difficulty and cost of assuring athletes' safety over such a long course and time period. Increased traffic in the race's later years was a specific factor in its decision to fold the race.
