= Nishinippon Shimbun =

Japanese newspaper

The Nishinippon (The Nishinippon Shimbun)

- Front page of Nishinippon Shimbun on September 28, 2026
- Type: Daily newspaper
- Format: Blanket (54.6 cm x 40.65 cm)
- Owner(s): The Nishinippon Shimbun Co., Ltd.
- Publisher: Takao Kawasaki
- Founded: March 1877
- Political alignment: Center-left
- Language: Japanese
- Headquarters: Fukuoka
- Circulation: Morning edition: 427,855; Evening edition: 40,677 (ABC Japan, average for May 2022)
- Price: Morning edition: 130 Yen/copy; Evening edition: 50 Yen/copy; Subscription: 3,925 Yen/month (Morning and evening edition)
- Sister newspapers: The Shikoku Shimbun
- Website: www.nishinippon.co.jp

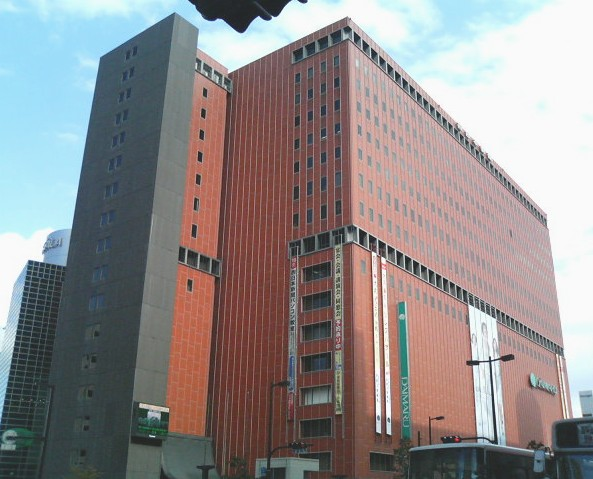
Headquarters of Nishinippon Shimbun in Fukuoka.

The Nishinippon Shimbun (西日本新聞, Nishinippon Shinbun; West-Japan Daily) is a Japanese language daily newspaper published by the Nishinippon Shimbun Co., Ltd (株式会社西日本新聞社, Kabushiki-gaisha Nishinippon Shinbunsha). As of 2022, it had a circulation of about 467,000 (total of morning and evening editions). It is headquartered in Fukuoka, which accounts for the bulk of its circulation, and is also sold throughout Kyūshū.

== History ==
Nishinippon Shimbun began in 1877 as the Chikushi Shimbun to report the Seinan Civil War. In 1880 it became the Fukuoka Nichi-Nichi Shimbun and then in 1942, during the Pacific War, it joined with Kyushu Hodo to form the Nishinippon Shimbun.

== Domestic network ==
Nishinippon Shimbun is the largest regional newspaper in Kyushu. Its reporters network covers all of Kyushu. In addition to its main office in Fukuoka City, it has 65 local offices in the 7 prefectures of Kyushu, and has Tokyo and Osaka branches.

== Foreign correspondents network ==
Nishinippon Shimbun has six foreign bureaus, in Washington, D.C., Paris, Beijing, Taipei, Seoul, and Bangkok. It has also had a writer program with Busan Ilbo in Busan, Korea.

== Events and teams sponsored ==
In 1950, Nishinippon Shimbun owned the Nishi-Nippon Pirates, a Japanese baseball team and a founding member of Nippon Professional Baseball's Central League. The Pirates only lasted one season before being merged with the Nishitetsu Clippers to form the Nishitetsu Lions.

The Nishinippon Shimbun sponsors the Prince Takamatsu Cup Nishinippon Round-Kyūshū Ekiden (Grand Tour Kyushu), the world's longest relay race.
