= Relay race =

Team sport in athletics, swimming, etc

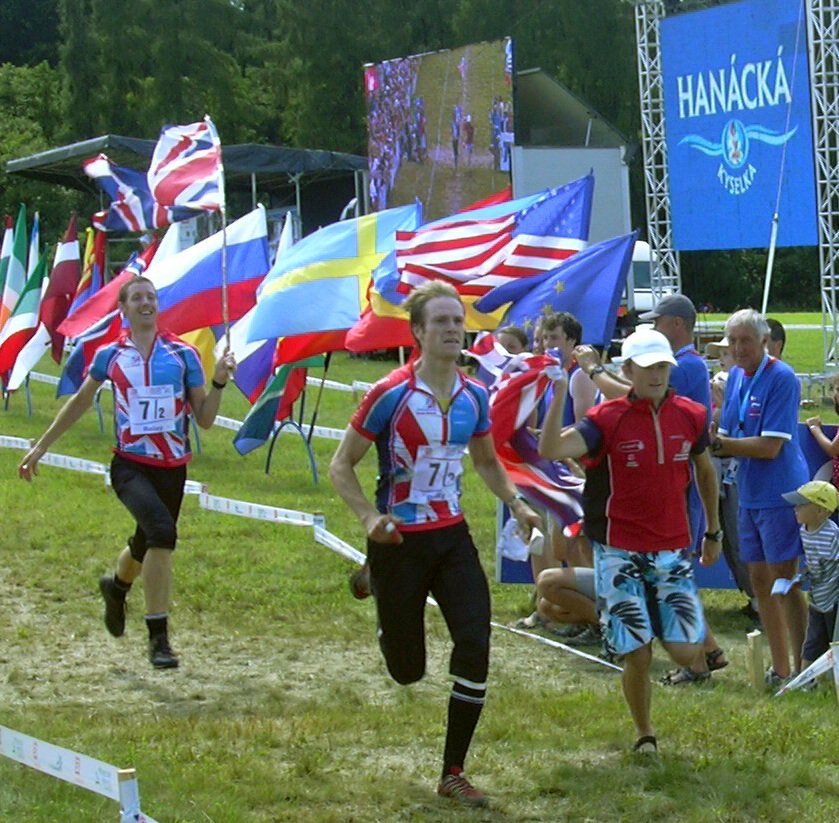
World Orienteering Championship 2008 gold medal winners in relay

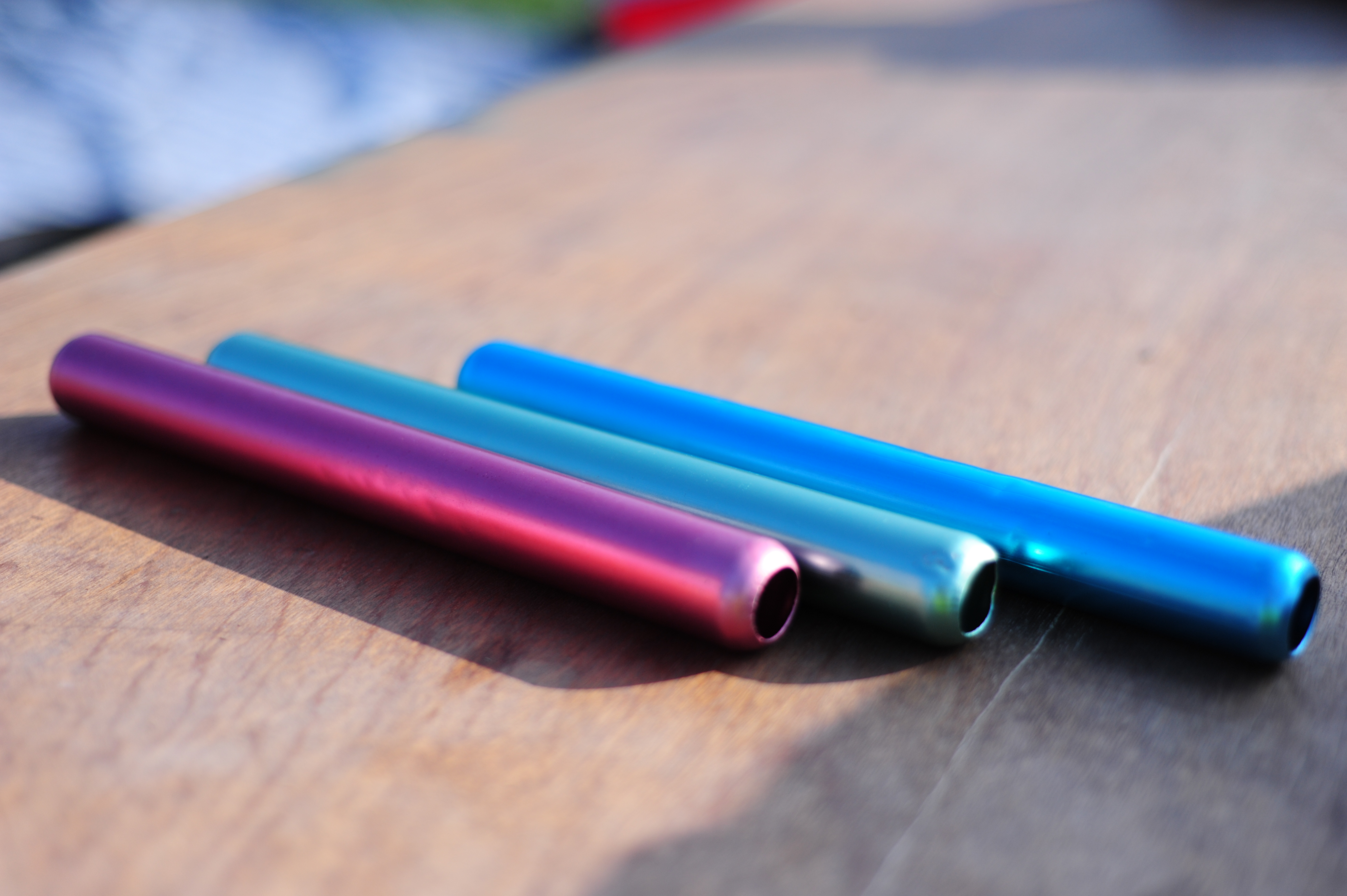
Batons

A relay race is a racing competition where members of a team take turns completing parts of racecourse or performing a certain action. Relay races take the form of professional races and amateur games. Relay races are common in running, orienteering, swimming, cross-country skiing, biathlon, or ice skating (usually with a baton in the fist). In the Olympic Games, there are several types of relay races that are part of track and field, each consisting of a set number of stages (legs) (usually four), each leg run by different members of a team. The runner finishing one leg is usually required to pass the next runner a stick-like object known as a "baton" while both are running in a marked exchange zone. In most relays, team members cover equal distances: Olympic events for both men and women are the 400-metre (4 × 100-metre) and 1,600-metre (4 × 400-metre) relays. Some non-Olympic relays are held at distances of 800 m, 3,200 m, and 6,000 m. In the less frequently run medley relays, however, the athletes cover different distances in a prescribed order—as in a sprint medley of 200, 200, 400, 800 metres or a distance medley of 1,200, 400, 800, 1,600 metres.

== Relays in swimming ==
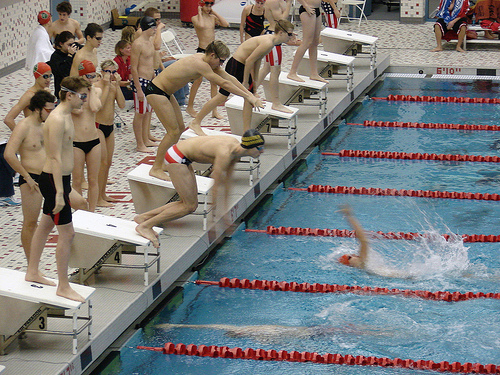
Swimmers about to make the pass during a relay race

A swimming relay of four swimmers usually follows this strategy: second-fastest, third-fastest, slowest, then fastest (anchor). However, it is not uncommon to see either the slowest swimmer racing in the second slot (creating an order of second-fastest, slowest, third-fastest, and then fastest), or an order from slowest to fastest (an order of slowest, third-fastest, second-fastest, fastest).

FINA rules require that a foot of the second, third or fourth swimmer must be contacting the platform while (and before) the incoming teammate is touching the wall; the starting swimmer may already be in motion, however, which saves 0.6–1.0 seconds compared to a regular start. Besides, many swimmers perform better in a relay than in an individual race owing to a team spirit atmosphere. As a result, relay times are typically 2–3 seconds faster than the sum of best times of individual swimmers.

In medley swimming, each swimmer uses a different stroke (in this order): backstroke, breaststroke, butterfly, and freestyle, with the added limitation that the freestyle swimmer cannot use any of the first three strokes. At competitive levels, essentially all freestyle swimmers use the front crawl. Note that this order is different from that for the individual medley, in which a single swimmer swims butterfly, backstroke, breaststroke, and freestyle in a single race, in that order.

The three standard relays raced at the Olympics are the 4 × 100 m freestyle relay, 4 × 200 m freestyle relay and 4 × 100 m medley relay.

Mixed-gendered relays were introduced at the 2014 FINA World Swimming Championships (25 m) (4 × 50 m freestyle and medley) and the 2015 World Aquatics Championships (4 × 100 m freestyle and medley). The event debuted at the 2020 Summer Olympics (4 × 100 m medley).

In open water swimming, mixed-gendered relays were introduced at the 2011 World Aquatics Championships (4 × 1250 m).

== Relays in athletics ==
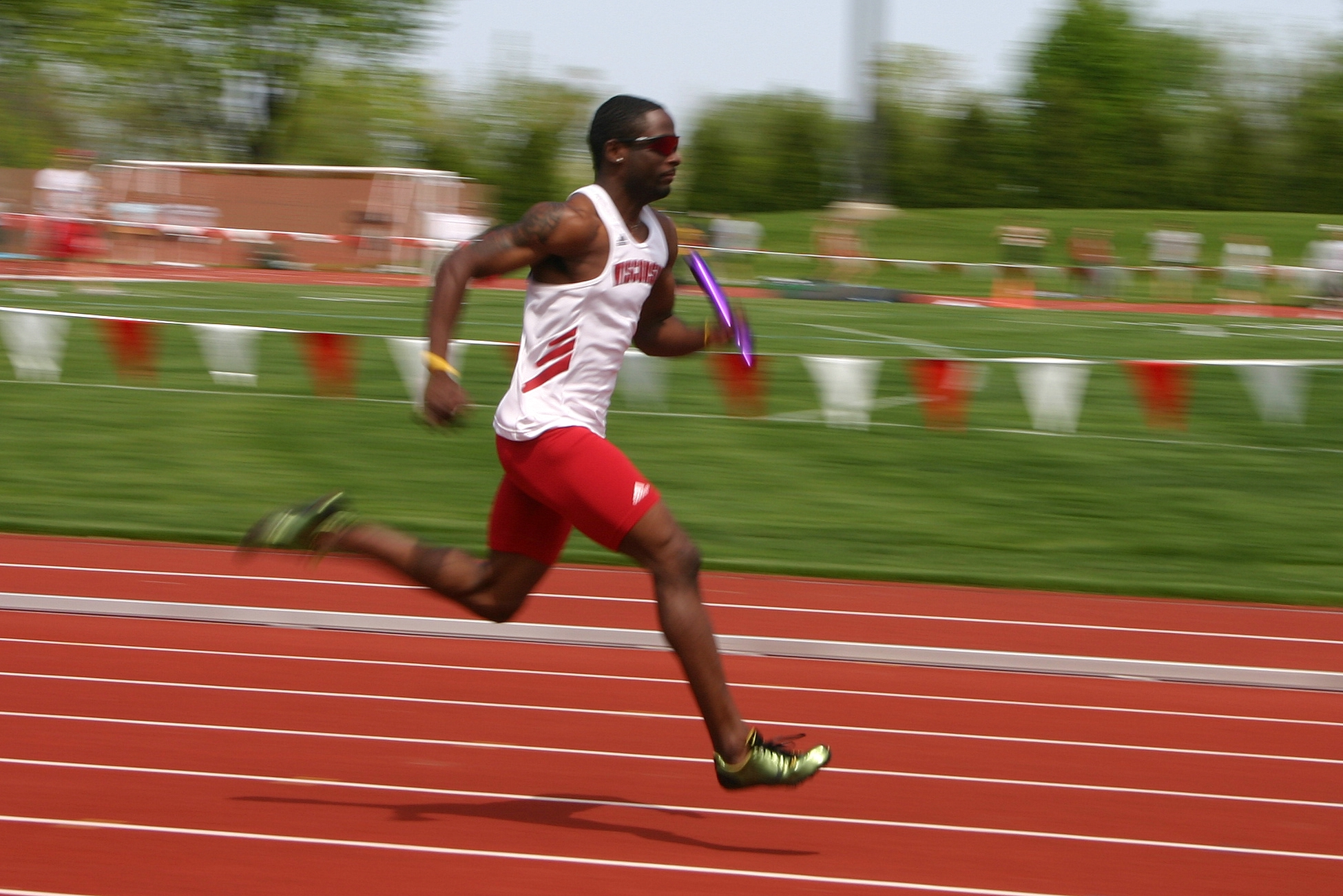
A final-leg runner for the University of Wisconsin holding a violet-colored baton

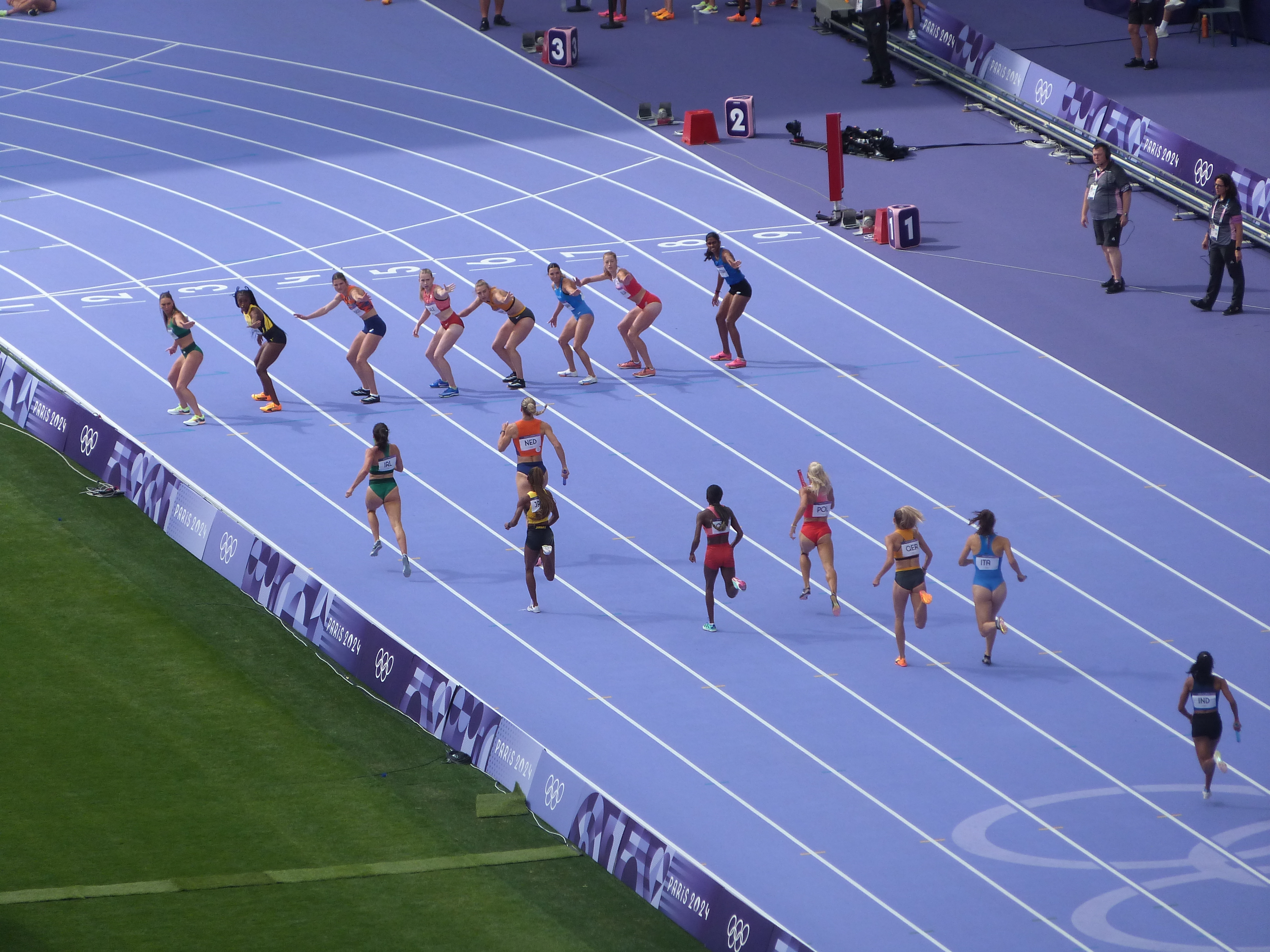
Third-leg runners approaching the anchor-leg runners for the handover during the women's 4 × 400 metres relay at the 2024 Summer Olympics

In athletics, the two standard relays are the 4 × 100 metres relay and the 4 × 400 metres relay. 4 × 200, 4 × 800, and 4 × 1500 m relays exist as well, but they are rarer. Mixed-gendered 4 × 400 metres relays were introduced at the 2017 IAAF World Relays, repeated at the 2018 Asian Games, the 2019 World Championships in Athletics and were added to the 2020 Summer Olympics. In addition, a 2 × 2 × 400 m and shuttle hurdles mixed relay races were introduced at the 2019 IAAF World Relays. Mixed-gendered 4 × 100 metres relays were introduced at the 2025 World Athletic Relays and continued into the 2026 platform of the same event.

Traditionally, the 4 × 400 m relay finals are the last event of a track meet, and is often met with a very enthusiastic crowd, especially if the last leg is a close race. (Note: Each segment of the relay (the distance run by one person) is referred to as a leg.) It is hard to measure exact splits in a 4 × 400 (or a 4 × 100) relay. For example, if a team ran a 3-minute 4 × 400, it does not mean every runner on the team has to run a 45-second open 400, because a person starts accelerating before they have the baton, therefore allowing for slightly slower overall open 400 times. A 4 × 400 relay generally starts in lanes for the first leg, including the handoff. The second leg then proceeds to run in lanes for the first 100 metres, after which point the runners are allowed to break into the first lane on the backstretch, as long as they do not interfere with other runners. A race organizer then puts the third-leg runners into a line depending on the order in which they are running (with the first place closest to the inside). The faster teams pass first, while the slower teams have to slide in to the inside lanes as they come available.

According to the IAAF rules, world records in relays can only be set if all team members have the same nationality. Several superior marks were established by teams from a mixture of countries and were thus never ratified.

Major USA Track and field events, f.e. the Penn Relays, Drake Relays, Kansas Relays, Mt. SAC Relays, Modesto Relays, Texas Relays, West Coast Relays, include different types of relays.

=== Rules and strategy ===
Each runner must hand off the baton to the next runner within a certain zone, usually marked by triangles on the track. In sprint relays, runners typically use a "blind handoff", where the second runner stands on a spot predetermined in practice and starts running when the first runner hits a visual mark on the track (usually a smaller triangle). The second runner opens their hand behind them after a few strides, by which time the first runner should be caught up and able to hand off the baton. Usually a runner will give an auditory signal, such as "Stick!" repeated several times, for the recipient of the baton to put out his hand. In middle-distance relays or longer, runners begin by jogging while looking back at the incoming runner and holding out a hand for the baton.

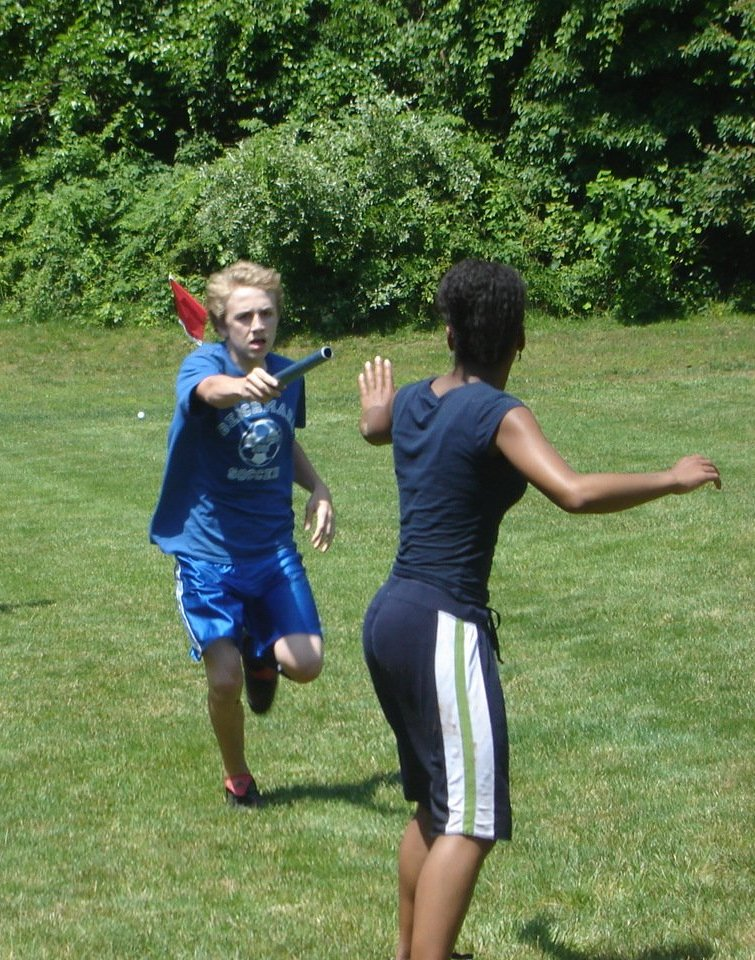
Two runners prepare to pass the baton.

A team may be disqualified from a relay for:

- Losing the baton (dropping the baton shall not result in disqualification. See IAAF rule no. 170.6)
- Making an improper baton pass, especially when not passing in the exchange zone
- False starting (usually once but sometimes twice)
- Improperly overtaking another competitor
- Preventing another competitor from passing
- Willfully impeding, improperly crossing the course, or in any other way interfering with another competitor

Based on the speed of the runners, the generally accepted strategy used in setting up a four-person relay team is: second-fastest, third-fastest, slowest, then fastest (anchor); however some teams (usually middle school or young high school) use second-fastest, slowest, third-fastest, then the fastest (anchor). But if a runner is better in the starting blocks than the others, they may be moved to the first spot because it is the only spot that uses starting blocks.

=== Competitions ===
The largest relay event in the world is the Norwegian Holmenkollstafetten, 2,944 teams of 15 starting and ending at Bislett Stadium in Oslo which had a total of 44,160 relay-competitors on May 10, 2014.

Another large relay event is the Penn Relays, which attracts over 15,000 competitors annually on the high-school, collegiate and professional levels, and over its three days attracts upwards of 100,000 spectators. It is credited with popularizing relay racing in the sport of track & field.

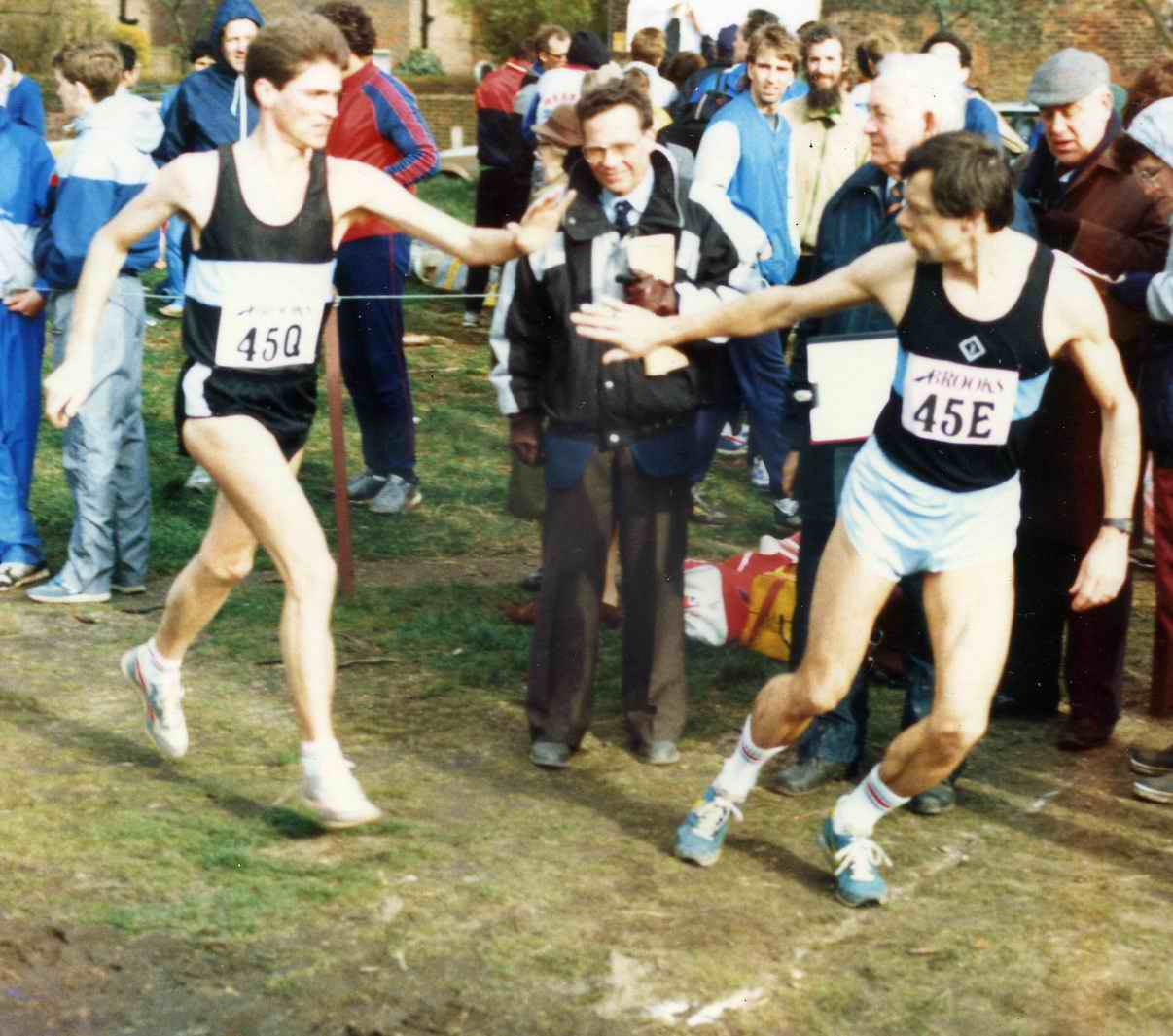
Athletes in the Southern Counties 12-Stage Road Relay Championships, Wimbledon Common, London, 1988

=== Long-distance relays ===
Long-distance relays have become increasingly popular with runners of all skill levels. These relays typically have 5 to 36 legs, each usually between 5 and 10 km (3.1 and 6.2 miles) long, though sometimes as long as 16 km (9.9 mi).

The IAAF World Road Relay Championships was held from 1986 to 1998, with six-member teams covering the classic 42.195-kilometre (26.219 mi) marathon distance.

Races under 100 kilometres (62 mi) are run in a day, with each runner covering one or two legs. Longer relays are run overnight, with each runner typically covering three legs.

The world's longest relay race was Japan's Prince Takamatsu Cup Nishinippon Round-Kyūshū Ekiden, which begins in Nagasaki and continues for 1,064 kilometres (661 mi).

=== Cross-country relays ===
For the 2017 IAAF World Cross Country Championships, a mixed relay race was added (4 × 2 km).

The Crusader Team Sprint Cross Country Relay Race is a venue specifically designed to get runners familiar with distance running for the rest of the cross country season. Teams are in pairs of runners and run four loops of a one-mile course. Runner “A” runs loop one and hands off to Runner “B.” Runner “B” runs the same loop and hands off back to Runner “A.” “A” runs one more loop, hands off to “B,” and “B” finishes. 3 race categories: boys, girls, and co-ed. Awards are given in each of the three categories.

=== Shuttle hurdle relay ===
The Shuttle hurdle relay is a Men's and Women's competition that is part of Relay meetings like Drake Relays or Penn Relays. A mixed version was introduced at the 2019 IAAF World Relays, it consist of a race in which two men and two women on each team, are running a 110 m hurdles.

=== Medley relay ===
Medley relay events are also occasionally held in track meets, usually consisting of teams of four runners running progressively longer distances. The distance medley relay consists of four legs run at distances of 1200, 400, 800, and 1,600 metres, in that order. The sprint medley relay usually consists of four legs run at distances of 400, 200, 200, and 800 metres, though a more uncommon variant of 200, 100, 100 and 400 metres (sometimes called a short sprint medley) also exists. See also Swedish relay.

Relays commemorative coin

=== Relays on coinage ===
Relay race events have been selected as a main motif in numerous collectors' coins. One of the recent samples is the €10 Greek Relays commemorative coin, minted in 2003 to commemorate the 2004 Summer Olympics. In the obverse of the coin three modern athletes run, holding their batons while in the background three ancient athletes are shown running a race known as the dolichos (a semi-endurance race of approximately 3,800 metres' distance).

== Relays in skiing ==
=== Cross-country skiing ===
The FIS Nordic World Ski Championships features a relay race since 1933, and a women's race since 1954. Each team has four skiers, each of whom must complete 10 kilometres / 6.2 miles (men) or 5 kilometres / 3.1 miles (women).

=== Biathlon ===
In biathlon, the relay race features a mass start, with teams consist of four biathletes. Each competitor must complete 7.5 kilometres / 4.66 miles (men) or 6.0 kilometres / 3.73 miles (women). Each leg is held over three laps, with two shooting rounds; one prone, one standing.

A mixed biathlon relay race was first held at the Biathlon World Championships 2005 in Khanty-Mansiysk, and it was added to the 2014 Winter Olympics.

== Relays in orienteering ==
There are two major relays in orienteering:

- Tiomila in April/May in Sweden
- Jukola and Venla relay in June in Finland

There are other relays in autumn with requirements about the age and gender distributions:

- Halikko relay, near Salo, Finland
- 25-manna, near Stockholm, Sweden

== Other relays ==
The World Triathlon Mixed Relay Championships is a mixed-gendered relay triathlon race held since 2009. Previously, the Triathlon Team World Championships were held in 2003, 2006 and 2007. Also, the triathlon at the Youth Olympic Games has a mixed relay race since 2010, and the event was introduced at the 2020 Summer Olympics. As in standard triathlons, each triathlon competitor must do a segment of swimming, cycling and running.

The madison is a track cycling event where two riders take turns to complete the race. Riders can alternate at any moment by touching the partner with the hand. The madison is featured at the UCI Track Cycling World Championships since 1995 and the Olympics since 2000. The format has been used in six-day racing. In road racing, the Duo Normand is a two-man time trial relay held annually in Normandy, France. In mountain biking, the UCI Mountain Bike World Championships has a mixed team relay race since 1999.

The game show Triple Threat had a bonus round called the "Triple Threat Relay Round" which was played like a relay race. The winning team had to take turns matching song titles to its corresponding musical artists.

== See also ==
- 4 × 100 metres relay
- 4 × 400 metres relay
- Anchor leg
- Ekiden
- Relay (disambiguation)
- River to River Relay
