= 1982 in marathon running =

This page lists the World Best Year Performances in the year 1982 in the Marathon for both men and women. Australia's Robert de Castella broke the men's world record on December 6, 1981, at the Fukuoka Marathon, clocking a total time of 2:08:18.

== Men ==
=== Records ===
Standing records prior to the 1982 season in track and field
World Record	Robert de Castella (AUS)	2:08:18	December 6, 1981	Fukuoka, Japan

=== 1982 World Year Ranking ===
Rank	Time	Athlete	Pos	Venue	Date	Note
1	2:08:52	Alberto Salazar (USA)	1	Boston, United States	19-04-1982	
2	2:08:54	Dick Beardsley (USA)	2	Boston, United States	19-04-1982	Personal Best
3	2:09:18	Robert de Castella (AUS)	1	Brisbane, Australia	08-10-1982	
4	2:09:24	Hugh Jones (ENG)	1	London, United Kingdom	09-05-1982	Personal Best
5	2:09:30	Juma Ikangaa (TAN)	2	Brisbane, Australia	08-10-1982	
6	2:09:33	Rodolfo Gómez (MEX)	2	New York City, United States	24-10-1982	
7	2:10:15	Paul Ballinger (NZL)	1	Fukuoka, Japan	05-12-1982	Personal Best
8	2:10:33	Vadim Sidorov (URS)	1	Tokyo, Japan	31-01-1982	Personal Best
9	2:11:00	Greg Meyer (USA)	1	Chicago, United States	26-09-1982	
10	2:11:08	Bill Rodgers (USA)	1	Melbourne, Australia	17-10-1982	
11	2:11:09	Hideki Kita (JPN)	2	Fukuoka, Japan	05-12-1982	
12	2:11:12	Benji Durden (USA)	1	Houston, United States	24-01-1982	
13	2:11:12	Bruno Lafranchi (SUI)	3	Fukuoka, Japan	05-12-1982	Personal Best
14	2:11:21	Rod Dixon (NZL)	1	Auckland, New Zealand	30-05-1982	
15	2:11:22	Stefano Brunetti (ITA)	3	Tokyo, Japan	31-01-1982	Personal Best
16	2:11:25	Giuseppe Gerbi (ITA)	1	Ferrara, Italy	02-05-1982	Personal Best
17	2:11:27	Massimo Magnani (ITA)	2	Ferrara, Italy	02-05-1982	
18	2:11:40	Steve Kenyon (ENG)	1	Gateshead, United Kingdom	13-06-1982	Personal Best
18	2:11:40	Joseph Nzau (KEN)	2	Chicago, United States	26-09-1982	
20	2:11:44	Gabashane Rakabaele (LES)	1	Port Elizabeth, South Africa	01-05-1982	
21	2:11:45	Kunimitsu Ito (JPN)	4	Fukuoka, Japan	05-12-1982	
22	2:11:46	John Halberstadt (RSA)	3	Chicago, United States	26-09-1982	Personal Best
23	2:11:50	Allan Zachariasen (DEN)	1	St Paul, United States	03-10-1982	
24	2:11:53	Robert Hodge (USA)	5	Fukuoka, Japan	05-12-1982	
25	2:11:54	Dan Schlesinger (USA)	3	New York City, United States	24-10-1982	
26	2:12:02	John Lodwick (USA)	3	Boston, United States	19-04-1982	
27	2:12:06	Mike Gratton (ENG)	3	Brisbane, Australia	08-10-1982	
28	2:12:09	Valeriy Solovyev (URS)	6	Fukuoka, Japan	05-12-1982	Personal Best
29	2:12:11	Takao Nakamura (JPN)	4	Tokyo, Japan	31-01-1982	
30	2:12:15	Jouni Kortelainen (FIN)	5	Tokyo, Japan	31-01-1982	
31	2:12:15	Cor Vriend (NED)	1	Amsterdam, Netherlands	08-05-1982	
32	2:12:16.8	David Brian Long (ENG)	1	Miami, United States	16-01-1982	Personal Best
33	2:12:21	Øyvind Dahl (NOR)	2	London, United Kingdom	09-05-1982	
34	2:12:22	Bernard Rose (RSA)	2	Port Elizabeth, South Africa	01-05-1982	
35	2:12:25	David Edge (CAN)	4	Chicago, United States	26-09-1982	
36	2:12:26	José Reveyn (BEL)	2	Amsterdam, Netherlands	08-05-1982	Personal Best
37	2:12:32	Tommy Persson (SWE)	2	Miami, United States	16-01-1982	
38	2:12:33	Svend-Erik Kristensen (DEN)	6	Tokyo, Japan	31-01-1982	
39	2:12:33	Randy Thomas (USA)	5	Chicago, United States	26-09-1982	
40	2:12:36	Ferenc Szekeres (HUN)	7	Tokyo, Japan	31-01-1982	
41	2:12:40	Kevin Ryan (NZL)	2	Auckland, New Zealand	30-05-1982	
42	2:12:41	Hailu Ebba (ETH)	2	Eugene, United States	12-09-1982	
43	2:12:42	Giampaolo Messina (ITA)	6	Chicago, United States	26-09-1982	Personal Best
44	2:12:44	Ryszard Marczak (POL)	4	New York City, United States	24-10-1982	
45	2:12:47	Kjell-Erik Ståhl (SWE)	5	Boston, United States	19-04-1982	
46	2:12:47	Ed Mendoza (USA)	7	Chicago, United States	26-09-1982	
47	2:12:48	David Murphy (ENG)	5	New York City, United States	24-10-1982	
48	2:12:49	David Cannon (ENG)	2	Gateshead, United Kingdom	13-06-1982	
49	2:12:50	Grenville Wood (AUS)	2	Melbourne, Australia	17-10-1982	Personal Best
50	2:12:54	Delfim Moreira (POR)	1	Frankfurt, West Germany	23-05-1982	

== Women ==
=== Records ===
Standing records prior to the 1982 season in track and field
World Record	Christa Vahlensieck (FRG)	2:34:47.5	September 10, 1977	Berlin, West Germany

=== 1982 World Year Ranking ===
Rank	Time	Athlete	Pos	Venue	Date	Note
1	2:26:12	Joan Samuelson (USA)	1	Eugene, United States	12-09-1982	
2	2:27:14	Grete Waitz (NOR)	1	New York City, United States	24-10-1982	
3	2:28:33	Julie Brown (USA)	2	New York City, United States	24-10-1982	
4	2:29:01.6	Charlotte Teske (FRG)	1	Miami, United States	16-01-1982	
5	2:29:43	Joyce Smith (ENG)	1	London, United Kingdom	09-05-1982	
6	2:32:55	Rita Marchisio (ITA)	1	Osaka, Japan	24-01-1982	
7	2:32:56	Regina Joyce (IRL)	1	Scottsdale, United States	04-12-1982	
8	2:33:01	Laura Fogli (ITA)	4	New York City, United States	24-10-1982	
9	2:33:24	Nancy Conz (USA)	1	Chicago, United States	26-09-1982	
10	2:33:36	Ingrid Kristiansen (NOR)	5	New York City, United States	24-10-1982	
11	2:33:51	Laurie Binder (USA)	2	Eugene, United States	12-09-1982	
12	2:34:14	Carla Beurskens (NED)	2	Osaka, Japan	24-01-1982	
13	2:34:24	Julie Isphording (USA)	6	New York City, United States	24-10-1982	
14	2:34:26	Zoya Ivanova (URS)	1	Tokyo, Japan	14-11-1982	
15	2:34:28	Jan Yerkes (USA)	1	Philadelphia, United States	28-11-1982	
16	2:34:28.4	Midde Hamrin (SWE)	1	The Woodlands, United States	27-02-1982	
17	2:34:35	Alison Blake (ENG)	1	Bedford, United Kingdom	14-10-1982	
18	2:34:41	Karen Dunn (USA)	2	Chicago, United States	26-09-1982	
19	2:34:42	Christa Vahlensieck (FRG)	3	Osaka, Japan	24-01-1982	
20	2:34:59	Laura deWald (USA)	4	Osaka, Japan	24-01-1982	
21	2:34:59.3	Nanae Sasaki (JPN)	1	Christchurch, New Zealand	06-06-1982	
22	2:35:18	Ellen Hart Peña (USA)	3	Eugene, United States	12-09-1982	
23	2:35:37	Nadezhda Gumerova (URS)	8	New York City, United States	24-10-1982	
24	2:36:04	Rosa Mota (POR)	1	Athens, Greece	12-09-1982	
25	2:36:05.5	Annick Loir (FRA)	1	Montréal, Canada	30-05-1982	
26	2:36:10	Jacqueline Gareau (CAN)	2	Boston, United States	19-04-1982	
27	2:36:12	Kathryn Binns (ENG)	1	Windsor, United Kingdom	12-06-1982	Personal Best
28	2:36:13	Lorraine Moller (NZL)	1	San Francisco, United States	06-06-1982	
29	2:36:14	Debbie Eide (USA)	4	Eugene, United States	12-09-1982	
30	2:36:34	Akemi Masuda (JPN)	1	Chiba, Japan	21-02-1982	
31	2:36:38	Heidi Hutterer (FRG)	1	Frankfurt, West Germany	23-05-1982	
32	2:36:50	Glenys Quick (NZL)	3	Chicago, United States	26-09-1982	
33	2:37:04	Raisa Smekhnova (URS)	2	Moscow, Soviet Union	27-06-1982	
34	2:37:08	Christine Seeman (FRA)	2	Frankfurt, West Germany	23-05-1982	
35	2:37:14	Lutsia Belyayeva (URS)	1	Uzhgorod, Soviet Union	10-10-1982	
36	2:37:16	Eileen Claugus (USA)	4	Chicago, United States	26-09-1982	
37	2:37:28	Annie van Stiphout (NED)	1	Amsterdam, Netherlands	08-05-1982	
38	2:37:38	Irina Bondarchuk (URS)	4	Moscow, Soviet Union	27-06-1982	
39	2:37:52	Tuija Toivonen (FIN)	1	Seinajoki, Finland	23-05-1982	
40	2:37:53	Carol Gould (ENG)	2	Windsor, United Kingdom	12-06-1982	
41	2:37:57	Susan King (USA)	1	Melbourne, Australia	17-10-1982	
42	2:38:03	Karolina Szabó (HUN)	1	Papa, Hungary	27-06-1982	
43	2:38:08	Raisa Sadreydinova (URS)	6	Moscow, Soviet Union	27-06-1982	
44	2:38:08	Nancy Ditz (USA)	10	New York City, United States	24-10-1982	
45	2:38:12	Cynthia Hamilton (CAN)	11	New York City, United States	24-10-1982	
46	2:38:17	Elena Tsukhlo (URS)	2	Tokyo, Japan	14-11-1982	
47	2:38:20	Monika Lövenich (FRG)	7	Osaka, Japan	24-01-1982	
48	2:38:24	Jane Buch (USA)	1	Huntsville, United States	11-12-1982	
49	2:38:29	Antonia Ladanyi (HUN)	1	Budapest, Hungary	31-10-1982	
50	2:38:31.7	Carey May (IRL)	2	San Francisco, United States	06-06-1982	
