= 1985 in the sport of athletics =

1985 in athletics
- Major world events: World Indoor Games

This article contains an overview of the year 1985 in the sport of athletics.

== International Events ==
- African Championships
- Asian Championships
- Balkan Games
- Bolivarian Games
- Central American and Caribbean Championships
- European Indoor Championships
- South American Championships
- Pan Arab Games
- World Cross Country Championships
- World Cup
- World Indoor Games
- World Student Games

== World records ==
=== Men ===
EVENT	ATHLETE	MARK	DATE	VENUE
1,500 metres	Steve Cram (GBR)	3:29.67	16 July	Nice, France
1,500 metres	Said Aouita (MAR)	3:29.46	23 August	Berlin, West Germany
Mile	Steve Cram (GBR)	3:46.32	27 July	Oslo, Norway
2,000 metres	Steve Cram (GBR)	4:51.39	4 August	Budapest, Hungary
5,000 metres	Said Aouita (MAR)	13:00.40	27 July	Oslo, Norway
High Jump	Rudolf Povarnitsyn (URS)	2.40m	11 August	Donetsk, Soviet Union
High Jump	Igor Paklin (URS)	2.41m	4 September	Kobe, Japan
Pole vault	Sergey Bubka (URS)	6.00m	13 July	Paris, France
Triple Jump	Willie Banks (USA)	17.97m	16 June	Indianapolis, USA
Shot Put	Ulf Timmermann (GDR)	22.62m	22 September	Berlin, Germany
Half Marathon	Steve Jones (GBR)	1:01:14	11 August	Birmingham, UK
Half Marathon	Mark Curp (USA)	1:00:55	15 September	Philadelphia, United States
Marathon	Carlos Lopes (POR)	2:07:12	20 April	Rotterdam, Netherlands

=== Women ===
EVENT	ATHLETE	MARK	DATE	VENUE
400 metres	Marita Koch (GDR)	47.60	6 October	Canberra, Australia
Mile	Mary Slaney (USA)	4:16.71	21 August	Zürich, Switzerland
5,000 metres	Zola Budd (GBR)	14:48.07	26 August	London, Great Britain
10,000 metres	Ingrid Kristiansen (NOR)	30:59.42	27 July	Oslo, Norway
400m Hurdles	Sabine Busch (GDR)	53.55	22 September	East Berlin, East Germany
4 × 100 m Relay	East Germany (GDR) • Silke Möller • Sabine Günther • Ingrid Auerswald • Marlies Göhr	41.37	6 October	Canberra, Australia
Long Jump	Heike Drechsler (GDR)	7.44	22 September	East Berlin, East Germany
Javelin throw	Petra Felke (GDR)	75.26	4 June	Schwerin, East Germany
Javelin throw	Petra Felke (GDR)	75.40	4 June	Schwerin, East Germany

== Men's Best Year Performers ==
=== 100 metres ===
RANK	1985 WORLD BEST PERFORMERS	TIME
1.	Carl Lewis (USA)	9.98
2.	Ben Johnson (CAN)	10.00
3.	Harvey Glance (USA)	10.05
4.	Frank Emmelmann (GDR)	10.06
5.	Terry Scott (USA)	10.08

=== 200 metres ===
RANK	1985 WORLD BEST PERFORMERS	TIME
1.	Lorenzo Daniel (USA)	20.07
2.	Kirk Baptiste (USA)	20.11
3.	Roy Martin (USA)	20.13
4.	Calvin Smith (USA)	20.14
5.	Mike Conley (USA)	20.21

=== 400 metres ===
RANK	1985 WORLD BEST PERFORMERS	TIME
1.	Michael Franks (USA)	44.47
2.	Thomas Schönlebe (GDR)	44.62
3.	Innocent Egbunike (NGR)	44.66
4.	Roddie Haley (USA)	44.67
5.	Darrell Robinson (USA)	44.71

=== 800 metres ===
RANK	1985 WORLD BEST PERFORMERS	TIME
1.	Joaquim Cruz (BRA)	1:42.49
2.	Johnny Gray (USA)	1:42.60
3.	Steve Cram (GBR)	1:42.88
4.	Sebastian Coe (GBR)	1:43.07
5.	David Mack (USA)	1:43.35

=== 1,500 metres ===
RANK	1985 WORLD BEST PERFORMERS	TIME
1.	Saïd Aouita (MAR)	3:29.46
2.	Steve Cram (GBR)	3:29.67
3.	Sydney Maree (USA)	3:29.77
4.	José Luis González (ESP)	3:30.92
5.	José Manuel Abascal (ESP)	3:31.69

=== Mile ===
RANK	1985 WORLD BEST PERFORMERS	TIME
1.	Steve Cram (GBR)	3:46.32
2.	Saïd Aouita (MAR)	3:46.92
3.	José Luis González (ESP)	3:47.79
4.	Sebastian Coe (GBR)	3:49.22
5.	Steve Scott (USA)	3:49.93

=== 3,000 metres ===
RANK	1985 WORLD BEST PERFORMERS	TIME
1.	Saïd Aouita (MAR)	7:32.94
2.	Doug Padilla (USA)	7:38.25
3.	Steve Scott (USA)	7:38.53
4.	Thomas Wessinghage (FRG)	7:42.61
5.	Johan Fourie (RSA)	7:44.0

=== 5,000 metres ===
RANK	1985 WORLD BEST PERFORMERS	TIME
1.	Saïd Aouita (MAR)	13:00.40
2.	Sydney Maree (USA)	13:01.15
3.	Alberto Cova (ITA)	13:10.06
4.	Bruce Bickford (USA)	13:13.49
5.	Doug Padilla (USA)	13:15.44

=== 10,000 metres ===
RANK	1985 WORLD BEST PERFORMERS	TIME
1.	Bruce Bickford (USA)	27:37.17
2.	Mark Nenow (USA)	27:40.85
3.	Ed Eyestone (USA)	27:41.05
4.	Fernando Mamede (POR)	27:41.09
5.	Toshihiko Seko (JPN)	27:42.17

=== Half Marathon ===
RANK	1985 WORLD BEST PERFORMERS	TIME
1.	Mark Curp (USA)	1:00:55

=== 110m Hurdles ===
RANK	1985 WORLD BEST PERFORMERS	TIME
1.	Roger Kingdom (USA)	13.14
2.	Greg Foster (USA)	13.24
3.	Andre Phillips (USA)	13.25
4.	Mark McKoy (CAN)	13.27
4.	Tonie Campbell (USA)	13.27

=== 400m Hurdles ===
RANK	1985 WORLD BEST PERFORMERS	TIME
1.	Danny Harris (USA)	47.63
2.	Andre Phillips (USA)	47.67
3.	Harald Schmid (FRG)	47.85
4.	Aleksandr Vasilyev (URS)	47.92
5.	Amadou Dia Bâ (SEN)	48.29

=== 3,000m Steeplechase ===
RANK	1985 WORLD BEST PERFORMERS	TIME
1.	Henry Marsh (USA)	8:09.17
2.	Krzysztof Wesolowski (POL)	8:11.04
3.	Joseph Mahmoud (FRA)	8:11.07
4.	Rainer Schwarz (FRG)	8:11.93
5.	Graeme Fell (CAN)	8:12.58

=== High Jump ===
RANK	1985 WORLD BEST PERFORMERS	HEIGHT
1.	Igor Paklin (URS)	2.41
2.	Rudolf Povarnitsyn (URS)	2.40
3.	Dietmar Mögenburg (FRG)	2.39
4.	Patrik Sjöberg (SWE)	2.38
5.	Eddy Annys (BEL)	2.36

=== Long Jump ===
RANK	1985 WORLD BEST PERFORMERS	DISTANCE
1.	Carl Lewis (USA)	8.62
2.	Larry Myricks (USA)	8.44
3.	Jason Grimes (USA)	8.43
3.	Mike Conley (USA)	8.43
5.	Robert Emmiyan (URS)	8.30
5.	László Szalma (HUN)	8.30

=== Triple Jump ===
RANK	1985 WORLD BEST PERFORMERS	DISTANCE
1.	Willie Banks (USA)	17.97
2.	Charles Simpkins (USA)	17.86
3.	Khristo Markov (BUL)	17.77
4.	Mike Conley (USA)	17.71
5.	Oleg Protsenko (URS)	17.69

=== Discus ===
RANK	1985 WORLD BEST PERFORMERS	DISTANCE
1.	Imrich Bugár (TCH)	71.26
2.	Luis Delís (CUB)	70.00
3.	Jürgen Schult (GDR)	69.74
4.	Knut Hjeltnes (NOR)	69.62
5.	Juan Martínez (CUB)	69.32

=== Hammer ===
RANK	1985 WORLD BEST PERFORMERS	DISTANCE
1.	Jüri Tamm (URS)	84.08
2.	Yuriy Syedikh (URS)	82.70
3.	Günther Rodehau (GDR)	82.64
4.	Christoph Sahner (FRG)	81.56
5.	Matthias Moder (GDR)	80.92

=== Shot Put ===
RANK	1985 WORLD BEST PERFORMERS	DISTANCE
1.	Ulf Timmermann (GDR)	22.62
2.	Sergey Smirnov (URS)	22.05
3.	Alessandro Andrei (ITA)	21.95
4.	Remigius Machura (URS)	21.88
4.	Udo Beyer (GDR)	21.88

=== Javelin (old design) ===
RANK	1985 WORLD BEST PERFORMERS	DISTANCE
1.	Uwe Hohn (GDR)	96.96
2.	Brian Crouser (USA)	95.10
3.	Duncan Atwood (USA)	94.06
4.	Viktor Yevsyukov (URS)	93.70
5.	Zdeněk Adamec (TCH)	92.94

=== Pole Vault ===
RANK	1985 WORLD BEST PERFORMERS	HEIGHT
1.	Sergey Bubka (URS)	6.00
2.	Pierre Quinon (FRA)	5.90
3.	Joe Dial (USA)	5.85
4.	Vasiliy Bubka (URS)	5.80
4.	Mike Tully (USA)	5.80
4.	Thierry Vigneron (FRA)	5.80
4.	Pavel Bogatyryov (URS)	5.80
4.	Philippe Collet (FRA)	5.80
4.	Marian Kolasa (POL)	5.80

=== Decathlon ===
RANK	1985 WORLD BEST PERFORMERS	POINTS
1.	Torsten Voss (GDR)	8559
2.	Uwe Freimuth (GDR)	8504
3.	Siegfried Wentz (FRG)	8440
4.	Aleksandr Nevskiy (URS)	8409
5.	John Sayre (USA)	8381

== Women's Best Year Performers ==
=== 100 metres ===
RANK	1985 WORLD BEST PERFORMERS	TIME
1.	Marlies Göhr (GDR)	10.86
2.	Merlene Ottey-Page (JAM)	10.92
3.	Marita Koch (GDR)	10.97
4.	Marina Zhirova (URS)	10.98
5.	Silke Gladisch (GDR)	10.99

=== 200 metres ===
RANK	1985 WORLD BEST PERFORMERS	TIME
1.	Marita Koch (GDR)	21.78
2.	Merlene Ottey-Page (JAM)	21.93
3.	Valerie Brisco (USA)	21.98
4.	Silke Gladisch (GDR)	22.12
5.	Pam Marshall (USA)	22.39

=== 400 metres ===
RANK	1985 WORLD BEST PERFORMERS	TIME
1.	Marita Koch (GDR)	47.60
2.	Olga Vladykina (URS)	48.27
3.	Valerie Brisco (USA)	49.56
4.	Mariya Pinigina (URS)	49.61
5.	Jarmila Kratochvílová (TCH)	49.89

=== 800 metres ===
RANK	1985 WORLD BEST PERFORMERS	TIME
1.	Ella Kovacs (ROU)	1:55.68
2.	Jarmila Kratochvílová (TCH)	1:55.91
3.	Ravilya Agletdinova (URS)	1:56.24
4.	Nadiya Olizarenko (URS)	1:56.25
5.	Yekaterina Podkopayeva (URS)	1:56.65

=== 1,500 metres ===
RANK	1985 WORLD BEST PERFORMERS	TIME
1.	Mary Slaney (USA)	3:57.24
2.	Maricica Puică (ROU)	3:57.73
3.	Ravilya Agletdinova (URS)	3:58.40
4.	Natalya Artyomova (URS)	3:59.28
5.	Doina Melinte (ROU)	3:59.88

=== Mile ===
RANK	1985 WORLD BEST PERFORMERS	TIME
1.	Mary Slaney (USA)	4:16.71
2.	Maricica Puică (ROU)	4:17.33
3.	Zola Budd (GBR)	4:17.57
4.	Kirsty McDermott (GBR)	4:19.41
5.	Ulrike Bruns (GDR)	4:21.59

=== 3,000 metres ===
RANK	1985 WORLD BEST PERFORMERS	TIME
1.	Mary Slaney (USA)	8:25.83
2.	Maricica Puică (ROU)	8:27.83
3.	Zola Budd (GBR)	8:28.83
4.	Zamira Zaytseva (URS)	8:35.74
5.	Ulrike Bruns (GDR)	8:36.51

=== 5,000 metres ===
RANK	1985 WORLD BEST PERFORMERS	TIME
1.	Zola Budd (GBR)	14:48.07
2.	Natalya Artyomova (URS)	14:54.08
3.	Olga Bondarenko (URS)	14:55.76
4.	Ingrid Kristiansen (NOR)	14:57.43
5.	Maricica Puică (ROU)	15:06.04

=== 10,000 metres ===
RANK	1985 WORLD BEST PERFORMERS	TIME
1.	Ingrid Kristiansen (NOR)	30:59.42
2.	Olga Bondarenko (URS)	31:25.18
3.	Aurora Cunha (POR)	31:35.46
4.	Svetlana Guskova (URS)	31:57.80
5.	Lynn Jennings (USA)	32:03.37

=== Half Marathon ===
RANK	1985 WORLD BEST PERFORMERS	TIME
1.	Joan Benoit (USA)	1:09:44

=== 100m Hurdles ===
RANK	1985 WORLD BEST PERFORMERS	TIME
1.	Ginka Zagorcheva (BUL)	12.42
2.	Vera Akimova (URS)	12.59
3.	Svetlana Gusarova (URS)	12.61
4.	Nadezhda Korshunova (URS)	12.71
5.	Cornelia Oschkenat (GDR)	12.72

=== 400m Hurdles ===
RANK	1985 WORLD BEST PERFORMERS	TIME
1.	Sabine Busch (GDR)	53.33
2.	Genowefa Błaszak (POL)	54.27
3.	Tatyana Pavlova (URS)	54.34
4.	Marina Stepanova (URS)	54.37
5.	Judi Brown-King (USA)	54.38

=== High Jump ===
RANK	1985 WORLD BEST PERFORMERS	HEIGHT
1.	Stefka Kostadinova (BUL)	2.06
2.	Tamara Bykova (URS)	2.02
3.	Silvia Costa (CUB)	2.01
4.	Charmaine Weavers (RSA)	2.00
4.	Louise Ritter (USA)	2.00

=== Long Jump ===
RANK	1985 WORLD BEST PERFORMERS	DISTANCE
1.	Heike Drechsler (GDR)	7.44
2.	Yelena Khlopotnova (URS)	7.31
3.	Galina Chistyakova (URS)	7.28
4.	Jackie Joyner (USA)	7.24
5.	Helga Radtke (GDR)	7.19

=== Shot Put ===
RANK	1985 WORLD BEST PERFORMERS	DISTANCE
1.	Natalya Lisovskaya (URS)	21.73
2.	Natalya Akhrymenko (URS)	21.08
3.	Helena Fibingerová (TCH)	21.03
4.	Mihaela Loghin (ROU)	20.97
5.	Helma Knorscheidt (GDR)	20.79

=== Discus ===
RANK	1985 WORLD BEST PERFORMERS	DISTANCE
1.	Galina Savinkova (URS)	72.96
2.	Zdeňka Šilhavá (TCH)	70.70
3.	Maritza Marten (CUB)	70.50
4.	Martina Hellmann (GDR)	69.78
5.	Florenţa Crăciunescu (ROU)	69.50

=== Javelin (old design) ===
RANK	1985 WORLD BEST PERFORMERS	DISTANCE
1.	Petra Felke (GDR)	75.40
2.	Fatima Whitbread (GBR)	72.98
3.	Ivonne Leal (CUB)	71.82
4.	Tessa Sanderson (GBR)	71.18
5.	Tiina Lillak (FIN)	70.62

=== Heptathlon ===
RANK	1985 WORLD BEST PERFORMERS	POINTS
1.	Jackie Joyner (USA)	6718
2.	Jane Frederick (USA)	6666
3.	Malgorzata Nowak (POL)	6616
4.	Sabine Paetz (GDR)	6595
5.	Natalya Shubenkova (URS)	6510

== Marathon ==
=== Year Rankings ===
==== Men ====
RANK	ATHLETE	TIME	DATE	EVENT
1.	(Portugal) Carlos Lopes (POR)	2:07.12 WR	April 20	Rotterdam, Netherlands
2.	(Wales) Steve Jones (WAL)	2:07.13	October 20	Chicago, United States
3.	(Djibouti) Djama Robleh (DJI)	2:08.08	October 20	Chicago, United States
4.	(Djibouti) Hussein Ahmed Salah (DJI)	2:08.09	April 14	Hiroshima, Japan
5.	(Japan) Takeyuki Nakayama (JPN)	2:08.15	April 14	Hiroshima, Japan
6.	(Wales) Steve Jones (WAL)	2:08.16	April 21	London, United Kingdom
7.	(Djibouti) Djama Robleh (DJI)	2:08.26	April 14	Hiroshima, Japan
8.	(England) Charlie Spedding (ENG)	2:08.33	April 21	London, United Kingdom
9.	(Australia) Robert de Castella (AUS)	2:08.48	October 20	Chicago, United States
10.	(South Africa) Mark Plaatjes (RSA)	2:08.58	May 4	Port Elizabeth, South Africa

==== Women ====
RANK	ATHLETE	TIME	DATE	EVENT
1.	(Norway) Ingrid Kristiansen (NOR)	2:21:06 WR	April 21	London, United Kingdom
2.	(United States) Joan Samuelson (USA)	2:21:21	October 20	Chicago, United States
3.	(Norway) Ingrid Kristiansen (NOR)	2:23:05	October 20	Chicago, United States
4.	(Portugal) Rosa Mota (POR)	2:23:29	October 20	Chicago, United States
5.	(Netherlands) Carla Beurskens (NED)	2:27:50	October 20	Chicago, United States
6.	(England) Veronique Marot (ENG)	2:28:04	October 20	Chicago, United States
7.	(England) Sarah Rowell (ENG)	2:28:06	April 21	London, United Kingdom
8.	(Republic of Ireland) Carey May (IRL)	2:28:07	January 27	Osaka, Japan
9.	(Norway) Grete Waitz (NOR)	2:28:34	April 21	New York, United States
10.	(Canada) Silvia Ruegger (CAN)	2:28:36	January 6	Houston, United States

=== National Champions ===
NATION	MEN'S WINNER	TIME	WOMEN'S WINNER	TIME	PLACE	DATE
Australia	Grenville Wood	2:13:37	Elizabeth Patmore	2:46:00	Sydney	June 9
Belgium	Frederik Vandervennet	2:15:49	Agnes Pardaens	2:42:25	Leuven	June 9
Canada	Roger Schwegel	2:22:32	Bernadette Duffy	2:48:09	Winnipeg	June 16
Japan	Hisatoshi Shintaku	2:09:51	—	—	Fukuoka	December 1
Netherlands	Cor Vriend	2:15:51	Eefje van Wissen	2:39:32	Enschede	June 22
West Germany	Herbert Steffny	2:12:12	Charlotte Teske	2:32:38	Frankfurt	May 19
United States	Ken Martin	2:12:57	Nancy Ditz	2:31:36	Pittsburgh (men) / California (women)	May 5 (men) / December 8 (women)

=== Road races ===
Date	Race	Location	Men's winner	Time	Women's winner	Time
January 27	Osaka International Ladies Marathon	Japan	—	—	(Republic of Ireland) Carey May	2:28:07
February 2	Auckland Marathon	New Zealand	(United States) Jeff Wells	2:16:43	(Denmark) Kiersti Jakobsen	2:37:12
February 10	Tokyo Marathon	Japan	(Japan) Shigeru So	2:10:32	—	—
March 17	Barcelona Marathon	Spain	(Spain) Rafael Garcia	2:18:16	(Spain) Joaquina Casas	2:48:01
March 31	Vienna Marathon	Austria	(Austria) Gerhard Hartmann	2:14:59	(Soviet Union) Elena Tsukhlo	2:39:01
April 15	Boston Marathon	United States	(England) Geoff Smith	2:14:05	(United States) Lisa Rainsberger	2:34:06
April 20	Rotterdam Marathon	Netherlands	(Portugal) Carlos Lopes	2:07:12 WR	(Netherlands) Wilma Rusman	2:35:32
April 21	London Marathon	United Kingdom	(Wales) Steve Jones	2:08:16	(Norway) Ingrid Kristiansen	2:21:06 WR
May 5	Pittsburgh Marathon	United States	(United States) Ken Martin	2:12:57	(Australia) Lisa Ondieki	2:31:54
May 5	Vancouver Marathon	Canada	(Australia) Adrian Wellington	2:24:24	(Japan) Kikue Teshima	2:55:34
May 6	Belfast Marathon	(Northern Ireland) Belfast	(Northern Ireland) Martin Deane	2:15:52	(Northern Ireland) Moira O'Neill	2:45:40
May 12	Amsterdam Marathon	Netherlands	(Belgium) Jose Reveyn	2:19:25	(Netherlands) Carolien Lucas	2:47:15
May 12	Paris Marathon	France	(France) Jacky Boxberger	2:10:49	(United Kingdom) Maureen Hurst	2:43:31
May 19	Geneva Marathon	Switzerland	(Soviet Union) Nikolay Shamyeyev	2:19:17	(Soviet Union) Nadezhda Gumerova	2:36:04
June 1	Stockholm Marathon	Sweden	(Sweden) Tommy Persson	2:17:18	(Sweden) Jeanette Nordgren	2:36:43
July 21	San Francisco Marathon	United States	(United States) Ric Sayre	2:15:08	(Denmark) Kersti Jakosen	2:38:03
August 25	Reykjavik Marathon	Iceland	(West Germany) Josef Hermann	2:30:04	(United Kingdom) Leslie Watson	2:52:44
August 31	Oslo Marathon	Norway	(Sweden) Josef Machalek	2:19:00	(Norway) Oddrun Hovsengen	2:43:39
September 29	Berlin Marathon	West Germany	(England) Jimmy Ashworth	2:11:43	(Belgium) Magda Ilands	2:34:10
September 29	Portland Marathon	United States	(United States) Leonard Hill	2:19:42	(United States) Lynn Bernot	2:51:25
October 12	Enschede Marathon	Netherlands	(Hungary) Zoltan Köszegi	2:15:39	(Netherlands) Eefje van Wissen	2:39:32
October 12	Niagara Marathon	Canada	(United States) Mark Coleman	2:30:29	(Canada) Charlene MacDonald	3:07:20
October 13	Athens Classic Marathon	Greece	(Sweden) Michael Hill	2:26:20	(United Kingdom) Eryl Davies	3:04:30
October 13	Beijing Marathon	China	(Japan) Shigeru So	2:10:23	—	—
October 13	Melbourne Marathon	Australia	(Belgium) Frederick Vandervennet	2:12:35	(Australia) Margaret Reddan	2:44:56
October 20	Chicago Marathon	United States	(Wales) Steve Jones	2:07:13	(United States) Joan Samuelson	2:21:21
October 27	New York City Marathon	United States	(Italy) Orlando Pizzolato	2:11:34	(Norway) Grete Waitz	2:28:34
October 28	Dublin Marathon	(Republic of Ireland) Ireland	(Republic of Ireland) Dick Hooper	2:16:14	(United Kingdom) Julia Gates	2:41:26
November 3	Istanbul Marathon	Turkey	(Turkey) Mehmet Terzi	2:12:50	—	—
November 17	Buenos Aires Marathon	Argentina	(Argentina) Ruben Huerga	2:25:20	(Argentina) Derlis Maria Fraschina	3:59:47
November 17	Tokyo Marathon	Japan	—	—	(East Germany) Katrin Doerre	2:34:21
December 1	Fukuoka Marathon	Japan	(Japan) Hisatoshi Shintaku	2:09:51	—	—
December 8	Honolulu Marathon	United States	(Kenya) Ibrahim Hussein	2:12:08	(Netherlands) Carla Beurskens	2:35:51
December 17	Tiberias Marathon	Israel	(Scotland) Lindsay Robertson	2:15:39	(United States) Sharlet Gilbert	2:42:54

== Births ==
- January 4 — Antar Zerguelaïne, Algerian middle distance runner
- January 4 — Nataliya Zolotukhina, Ukrainian hammer thrower
- January 6 — Nick Owens, American hammer thrower
- February 10 — Mariya Smolyachkova, Belarusian hammer thrower
- March 2 — Patrick Makau Musyoki, Kenyan distance runner
- March 16 — Olexiy Sokyrskiyy, Ukrainian hammer thrower
- March 19 — Sean Wroe, Australian sprinter
- March 21 — Vladimir Kanaykin, Russian race walker
- March 25 — Wilfried Bingangoye, Gabonese sprinter
- April 6 — Anna Avdeyeva, Russian shot putter
- April 7 — James Rendón, Colombian race walker
- April 18 — Musa Amer Obaid, Kenyan-Qatari middle distance runner
- May 4 — Henry Sugut, Kenyan long-distance runner
- May 5 — Gu Junjie, Chinese triple jumper
- May 21 — Mohsen El Anany, Egyptian hammer thrower
- May 26 — Irina Petrova, Russian race walker
- May 27 — Karina Vnukova, Lithuanian high jumper
- May 31 — Kim Hyun-Sub, South Korean race walker
- June 1 — Tirunesh Dibaba, Ethiopian long-distance runner
- June 3 — Samwel Mwera, Tanzanian middle distance runner
- June 15 — Susan McKelvie, Scottish hammer thrower
- June 17 — Ozge Gurler, Turkish athlete
- June 21 — Ryoko Kizaki, Japanese long-distance runner
- July 29 — Anja Pollmächer, German sprinter
- July 31 — Brimin Kipruto, Kenyan middle distance runner
- August 26 — Oleksiy Kasyanov, Ukrainian decathlete
- September 17 — Tracy-Ann Rowe, Jamaican sprinter
- October 12 — Boniface Kiprop Toroitich, Ugandan athlete
- November 14 — Andrey Krivov, Russian race walker
- November 16 — Rogério Bispo, Brazilian long jumper
- November 18 — Allyson Felix, American sprinter
- December 1 — Andretti Bain, Bahamian sprinter
- December 8 — Kim Deok-Hyeon, South Korean triple jumper
- December 20 — Gilbert Kirwa, Kenyan marathon runner
- December 26 — Carol Rodríguez, Puerto Rican sprinter

== Deaths ==
- March 4 — Sverre Strandli (59), Norwegian hammer thrower (b. 1925)
- June 15 — Andy Stanfield (67), American athlete (b. 1927)
- October 30 — Edgar Bruun (80), Norwegian race walker (b. 1905)
