= Marathons at the World Athletics Championships =

Marathon at the World Athletics Championships
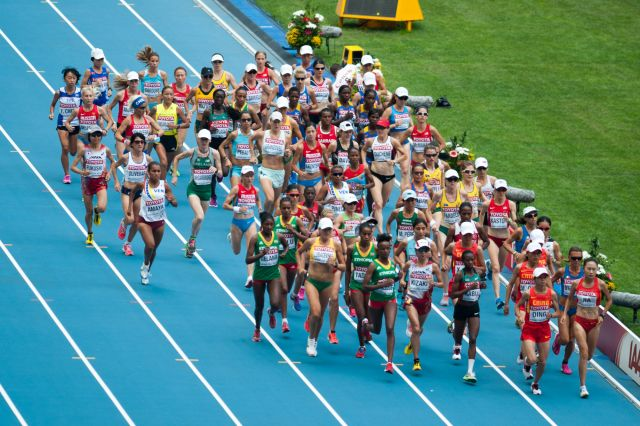
- Women starting the 2013 marathon on the track

Overview
- Gender: Men and women
- Years held: Men: 1983 – 2025; Women: 1983 – 2025

Championship record
- Men: 2:05:36 Tamirat Tola (2022)
- Women: 2:18:11 Gotytom Gebreslase (2022)

Reigning champion
- Men: Alphonce Simbu (TAN)
- Women: Peres Jepchirchir (KEN)

The marathon at the World Championships in Athletics has been contested by both men and women since the inaugural edition in 1983. It is the second most prestigious global title in the discipline after the marathon at the Olympics. From 1997 to 2011 it hosted the World Marathon Cup team event. It currently forms part of the World Marathon Majors circuit, which includes the six top annual races. The competition format has separate men's and women's races, which both serve as a straight final. Participation typically numbers between sixty and eighty runners per race. The event usually starts and ends in the main stadium, with the rest of the race taking place on the surrounding roads of the host city.

The championship records for the event are 2:06:54 hours for men, set by Abel Kirui in 2009, and 2:20:57 hours for women, set by Paula Radcliffe in 2005. The world record has never been broken or equalled at the competition by either men or women, reflecting the lack of pacemaking and athletes' more tactical approach to championship races.

Catherine Ndereba and Edna Kiplagat are the most successful athletes of the event, having each won two gold medals and one silver medal in the women's marathon. In addition, Kiplagat finished top five in five consecutive World Athletics Championship Marathons from 2011-2019. Three other athletes have won the World Championships marathon twice: Abel Antón, Jaouad Gharib, and Abel Kirui – all of whom along with Edna Kiplagat had back-to-back victories.

Kenya is the most successful nation in the discipline, having won ten gold medals overall (five in each division). Ethiopia is the next most successful, with six gold medallists. Spain has won three gold medals.

== Age records ==
- All information from World Athletics.

Distinction	Male			Female		
Distinction	Athlete	Age	Date	Athlete	Age	Date
Youngest champion	Ghirmay Ghebreslassie (ERI)	19 years, 281 days	22 Aug 2015	Bai Xue (CHN)	20 years, 251 days	23 Aug 2009
Youngest medalist	Ghirmay Ghebreslassie (ERI)	19 years, 281 days	22 Aug 2015	Bai Xue (CHN)	20 years, 251 days	23 Aug 2009
Youngest finalist	Ghirmay Ghebreslassie (ERI)	19 years, 281 days	22 Aug 2015	Kim Hye-Gyong (PRK)	20 years, 154 days	10 Aug 2013
Youngest participant	Ahmed Hassan (SOM)	18 years, 187 days	3 Aug 2001	Su Su-Ning (TPE)	14 years, 274 days	15 Aug 1993
Oldest champion	Abel Antón (ESP)	36 years, 308 days	28 Aug 1999	Catherine Ndereba (KEN)	35 years, 43 days	2 Sep 2007
Oldest medalist	Abel Antón (ESP)	36 years, 308 days	28 Aug 1999	Helalia Johannes (NAM)	39 years, 46 days	28 Sep 2019
Oldest finalist	Ruggero Pertile (ITA)	41 years, 14 days	22 Aug 2015	Roberta Groner (USA)	41 years, 267 days	28 Sep 2019
Oldest participant	Patrick Dupouy (PYF)	46 years, 85 days	5 Aug 1995	Colleen de Reuck (USA)	47 years, 136 days	27 Aug 2011

Patrick Dupouy of French Polynesia became the oldest male competitor of World Championships history in 2007, at the age of 46 years and 85 days. Under current regulations, the records for the youngest participants will remain indefinitely as any athlete in the junior category (under-20) that year, or younger, is ineligible to enter the marathon.

== Doping ==
The first doping ban to effect the World Championships marathon came in 2001, when Italy's Roberto Barbi (60th in the men's race) was disqualified. Original eighth-placer Nailiya Yulamanova was disqualified from the 2009 women's race and another Russian, Mikhail Lemayev, had his result annulled from the men's race that year. Biological passport irregularities saw Abderrahim Goumri's runs in 2009 and 2011 retrospectively annulled. The anti-doping programme at the 2013 championships saw Jeremías Saloj disqualified from the men's race for doping.

== Medalists ==
=== Men ===
Championships	Gold	Silver	Bronze
1983 Helsinki	Robert de Castella (AUS)	Kebede Balcha (ETH)	Waldemar Cierpinski (GDR)
1987 Rome	Douglas Wakiihuri (KEN)	Hussein Ahmed Salah (DJI)	Gelindo Bordin (ITA)
1991 Tokyo	Hiromi Taniguchi (JPN)	Hussein Ahmed Salah (DJI)	Steve Spence (USA)
1993 Stuttgart	Mark Plaatjes (USA)	Luketz Swartbooi (NAM)	Bert van Vlaanderen (NED)
1995 Gothenburg	Martín Fiz (ESP)	Dionicio Cerón (MEX)	Luíz Antônio dos Santos (BRA)
1997 Athens	Abel Antón (ESP)	Martín Fiz (ESP)	Steve Moneghetti (AUS)
1999 Seville	Abel Antón (ESP)	Vincenzo Modica (ITA)	Nobuyuki Sato (JPN)
2001 Edmonton	Gezahegne Abera (ETH)	Simon Biwott (KEN)	Stefano Baldini (ITA)
2003 Saint-Denis	Jaouad Gharib (MAR)	Julio Rey (ESP)	Stefano Baldini (ITA)
2005 Helsinki	Jaouad Gharib (MAR)	Christopher Isengwe (TAN)	Tsuyoshi Ogata (JPN)
2007 Osaka	Luke Kibet Bowen (KEN)	Mubarak Hassan Shami (QAT)	Viktor Röthlin (SUI)
2009 Berlin	Abel Kirui (KEN)	Emmanuel Kipchirchir Mutai (KEN)	Tsegaye Kebede (ETH)
2011 Daegu	Abel Kirui (KEN)	Vincent Kipruto (KEN)	Feyisa Lilesa (ETH)
2013 Moscow	Stephen Kiprotich (UGA)	Lelisa Desisa (ETH)	Tadese Tola (ETH)
2015 Beijing	Ghirmay Ghebreslassie (ERI)	Yemane Tsegay (ETH)	Solomon Mutai (UGA)
2017 London	Geoffrey Kirui (KEN)	Tamirat Tola (ETH)	Alphonce Simbu (TAN)
2019 Doha	Lelisa Desisa (ETH)	Mosinet Geremew (ETH)	Amos Kipruto (KEN)
2022 Eugene	Tamirat Tola (ETH)	Mosinet Geremew (ETH)	Bashir Abdi (BEL)
2023 Budapest	Victor Kiplangat (UGA)	Maru Teferi (ISR)	Leul Gebresilase (ETH)
2025 Tokyo	Alphonce Simbu (TAN)	Amanal Petros (GER)	Iliass Aouani (ITA)

==== Multiple medalists ====
Rank	Athlete	Nation	Period	Gold	Silver	Bronze	Total
1	Abel Antón	Spain (ESP)	1997–1999	2	0	0	2
1	Jaouad Gharib	Morocco (MAR)	2003–2005	2	0	0	2
1	Abel Kirui	Kenya (KEN)	2009–2011	2	0	0	2
4	Martín Fiz	Spain (ESP)	1995–1997	1	1	0	2
4	Lelisa Desisa	Ethiopia (ETH)	2013-2019	1	1	0	2
4	Tamirat Tola	Ethiopia (ETH)	2017-2022	1	1	0	2
7	Hussein Ahmed Salah	Djibouti (DJI)	1987–1991	0	2	0	2
7	Mosinet Geremew	Ethiopia (ETH)	2019–2022	0	2	0	2
9	Stefano Baldini	Italy (ITA)	2001–2003	0	0	2	2

==== Medalists by country ====
Rank	Nation	Gold	Silver	Bronze	Total
1	Kenya (KEN)	5	3	1	9
2	Ethiopia (ETH)	3	6	4	13
3	Spain (ESP)	3	2	0	5
4	Morocco (MAR)	2	0	0	2
4	Uganda (UGA)	2	0	0	2
6	Tanzania (TAN)	1	1	1	2
7	Japan (JPN)	1	0	2	3
8	Australia (AUS)	1	0	1	2
8	United States (USA)	1	0	1	2
10	Eritrea (ERI)	1	0	0	1
11	Djibouti (DJI)	0	2	0	2
12	Italy (ITA)	0	1	4	5
13	Germany (GER)	0	1	0	1
13	Mexico (MEX)	0	1	0	1
13	Israel (ISR)	0	1	0	1
13	Namibia (NAM)	0	1	0	1
13	Qatar (QAT)	0	1	0	1
18	Belgium (BEL)	0	0	1	1
18	Brazil (BRA)	0	0	1	1
18	East Germany (GDR)	0	0	1	1
18	Netherlands (NED)	0	0	1	1
18	Switzerland (SUI)	0	0	1	1

=== Women ===
Championships	Gold	Silver	Bronze
1983 Helsinki	Grete Waitz (NOR)	Marianne Dickerson (USA)	Raisa Smekhnova (URS)
1987 Rome	Rosa Mota (POR)	Zoya Ivanova (URS)	Jocelyne Villeton (FRA)
1991 Tokyo	Wanda Panfil (POL)	Sachiko Yamashita (JPN)	Katrin Dörre (GER)
1993 Stuttgart	Junko Asari (JPN)	Manuela Machado (POR)	Tomoe Abe (JPN)
1995 Gothenburg	Manuela Machado (POR)	Anuța Cătună (ROU)	Ornella Ferrara (ITA)
1997 Athens	Hiromi Suzuki (JPN)	Manuela Machado (POR)	Lidia Slăvuțeanu (ROU)
1999 Seville	Jong Song-ok (PRK)	Ari Ichihashi (JPN)	Lidia Șimon (ROU)
2001 Edmonton	Lidia Șimon (ROU)	Reiko Tosa (JPN)	Svetlana Zakharova (RUS)
2003 Saint-Denis	Catherine Ndereba (KEN)	Mizuki Noguchi (JPN)	Masako Chiba (JPN)
2005 Helsinki	Paula Radcliffe (GBR)	Catherine Ndereba (KEN)	Constantina Diţă-Tomescu (ROU)
2007 Osaka	Catherine Ndereba (KEN)	Zhou Chunxiu (CHN)	Reiko Tosa (JPN)
2009 Berlin	Bai Xue (CHN)	Yoshimi Ozaki (JPN)	Aselefech Mergia (ETH)
2011 Daegu	Edna Kiplagat (KEN)	Priscah Jeptoo (KEN)	Sharon Cherop (KEN)
2013 Moscow	Edna Kiplagat (KEN)	Valeria Straneo (ITA)	Kayoko Fukushi (JPN)
2015 Beijing	Mare Dibaba (ETH)	Helah Kiprop (KEN)	Eunice Kirwa (BHR)
2017 London	Rose Chelimo (BHR)	Edna Kiplagat (KEN)	Amy Cragg (USA)
2019 Doha	Ruth Chepng'etich (KEN)	Rose Chelimo (BHR)	Helalia Johannes (NAM)
2022 Eugene	Gotytom Gebreslase (ETH)	Judith Korir (KEN)	Lonah Chemtai Salpeter (ISR)
2023 Budapest	Amane Beriso Shankule (ETH)	Gotytom Gebreslase (ETH)	Fatima Ezzahra Gardadi (MAR)
2025 Tokyo	Peres Jepchirchir (KEN)	Tigst Assefa (ETH)	Julia Paternain (URU)

==== Multiple medalists ====
Rank	Athlete	Nation	Period	Gold	Silver	Bronze	Total
1	Catherine Ndereba	Kenya (KEN)	2003–2007	2	1	0	3
1	Edna Kiplagat	Kenya (KEN)	2011–2017	2	1	0	3
3	Manuela Machado	Portugal (POR)	1993–1997	1	2	0	3
4	Lidia Șimon	Romania (ROU)	1997–2001	1	0	2	3
5	Reiko Tosa	Japan (JPN)	2001–2007	0	1	1	2

==== Medalists by country ====
Rank	Nation	Gold	Silver	Bronze	Total
1	Kenya (KEN)	16	5	1	22
2	Ethiopia (ETH)	3	2	1	4
3	China (CHN)	2	15	14	31
4	Portugal (POR)	2	2	0	4
5	Romania (ROU)	1	1	3	5
6	Bahrain (BHR)	1	1	1	3
7	Hong Kong (HKG)	1	1	0	2
8	Great Britain (GBR)	1	0	0	1
8	North Korea (PRK)	1	0	0	1
8	Norway (NOR)	1	0	0	1
8	Poland (POL)	1	0	0	1
12	Italy (ITA)	0	1	0	1
12	Soviet Union (URS)	0	1	0	1
12	United States (USA)	0	1	0	1
15	France (FRA)	0	0	1	2
15	Israel (ISR)	0	0	1	1
15	Morocco (MAR)	0	0	1	1
15	Namibia (NAM)	0	0	1	1
15	Russia (RUS)	0	0	1	1
15	Uruguay (URU)	0	0	1	1

== Championship record progression ==
=== Men ===
Men's marathon World Championships record progression
Time	Athlete	Nation	Year	Round	Date
2:10:03	Robert De Castella	Australia (AUS)	1983	Final	14 August
2:08:31	Jaouad Gharib	Morocco (MAR)	2003	Final	30 August
2:06:54	Abel Kirui	Kenya (KEN)	2009	Final	22 August
2:05:36	Tamirat Tola	Ethiopia (ETH)	2022	Final	17 July

=== Women ===
Women's marathon World Championships record progression
Time	Athlete	Nation	Year	Round	Date
2:28:08	Grete Waitz	Norway (NOR)	1983	Final	7 August
2:25:17	Rosa Mota	Portugal (POR)	1987	Final	29 August
2:23:55	Catherine Ndereba	Kenya (KEN)	2003	Final	31 August
2:20:57	Paula Radcliffe	Great Britain (GBR)	2005	Final	14 August
2:18.11	Gotytom Gebreslase	Ethiopia (ETH)	2022	Final	18 July

== Finishing times ==
=== Top ten fastest World Championship times ===
Fastest men's times at the World Championships
Rank	Time (sec)	Athlete	Nation	Year	Date
1	2:05.36	Tamirat Tola	Ethiopia	2022	2022-07-17
2	2:06.44	Mosinet Geremew	Ethiopia	2022	2022-07-17
3	2:06.48	Bashir Abdi	Belgium	2022	2022-07-17
4	2:06.54	Abel Kirui	Kenya	2009	2009-08-22
5	2:07.09	Cameron Levins	Canada	2022	2022-07-17
6	2:07.14	Geoffrey Kamworor	Kenya	2022	2022-07-17
7	2:07.17	Seifu Tura	Ethiopia	2022	2022-07-17
8	2:07.31	Gabriel Geay	Tanzania	2022	2022-07-17
9	2:07.35	Daniel Ferreira do Nascimento	Brazil	2022	2022-07-17
10	2:07.38	Abel Kirui	Kenya	2011	2011-09-04

Fastest women's times at the World Championships
Rank	Time (sec)	Athlete	Nation	Year	Date
1	2:18.11	Gotytom Gebreslase	Ethiopia	2022	2022-07-18
2	2:18.20	Judith Korir	Kenya	2022	2022-07-18
3	2:20.18	Lonah Chemtai Salpeter	Israel	2022	2022-07-18
4	2:20.29	Nazret Weldu	Eritrea	2022	2022-07-18
5	2:20.57	Paula Radcliffe	Great Britain	2005	2005-08-14
6	2:22.01	Catherine Ndereba	Kenya	2005	2005-08-14
7	2:22.10	Sara Hall	United States	2022	2022-07-18
8	2:22.15	Angela Tanui	Kenya	2022	2022-07-18
9	2:23.18	Emma Bates	United States	2022	2022-07-18
10	2:23.19	Constantina Diță	Romania	2005	2005-08-14

== Bibliography ==
- Butler, Mark (2013). IAAF Statistics Book Moscow 2013 (PDF). IAAF. Archived from the original (PDF) on 12 October 2014.
