= 1984 Chicago Marathon =

Footrace held in Chicago, Illinois

8th Chicago Marathon
- Venue: Chicago, United States
- Dates: October 21

Champions
- Men: Steve Jones (2:08:05)
- Women: Rosa Mota (2:26:01)

The 1984 Chicago Marathon was the eighth running of the annual marathon race in Chicago, United States and was held on October 21. The elite men's race was won by Britain's Steve Jones in a time of 2:08:05 hours, setting a world best time. The women's race was won by Portugal's Rosa Mota in 2:26:01. A total of 5844 runners finished the race, an increase of over 600 from the previous year.

== Results ==
=== Men ===
Position	Athlete	Nationality	Time
1st place, gold medalist(s)	Steve Jones	United Kingdom	2:08:05 WR
2nd place, silver medalist(s)	Carlos Lopes	Portugal	2:09:06
3rd place, bronze medalist(s)	Robert de Castella	Australia	2:09:09
4	Gabriel Kamau	Kenya	2:10:05
5	Geoff Smith	United Kingdom	2:10:08
6	Martín Pitayo	Mexico	2:10:29
7	Jerry Kiernan	Ireland	2:12:24
8	Kjell-Erik Ståhl	Sweden	2:14:16
9	Agapius Masong	Tanzania	2:14:23
10	Cor Lambregts	Netherlands	2:14:46
11	Richard Kaitany	Kenya	2:14:50
12	Cor Saelmans	Belgium	2:15:13
13	Luc Waegeman	Belgium	2:15:23
14	Paul Cummings	United States	2:15:29
15	Osvaldo Faustini	Italy	2:15:44
16	Ivan Huff	United States	2:15:49
17	Simon Kigen	Kenya	2:15:58
18	Doug Kurtis	United States	2:16:17
19	Ronald Boreham	United Kingdom	2:16:21
20	Juan Zetina	Mexico	2:16:27
—	Joseph Nzau	Kenya	DNF

=== Women ===
Position	Athlete	Nationality	Time
1st place, gold medalist(s)	Rosa Mota	Portugal	2:26:01
2nd place, silver medalist(s)	Lisa Ondieki	Australia	2:27:40
3rd place, bronze medalist(s)	Ingrid Kristiansen	Norway	2:30:21
4	Dorthe Rasmussen	Denmark	2:30:42
5	Lisa Rainsberger	United States	2:31:31
6	Glenys Quick	New Zealand	2:32:53
7	Regina Joyce	Ireland	2:35:05
8	Jacqueline Gareau	Canada	2:35:33
9	Rita Borralho	Portugal	2:35:43
10	Magda Ilands	Belgium	2:36:04
11	Marie-Christine Deurbroeck	Belgium	2:38:25
12	Genoveva Dominguez	Mexico	2:41:50
13	Deborah Raunig	United States	2:42:15
14	Heidi Jacobsen	Norway	2:45:52
15	Karen Bukowski	United States	2:46:08
16	Karolina Szabó	Hungary	2:46:59
17	Sharon Greenwood	United States	2:48:18
