= 1984 New York City Marathon =

Footrace held in New York City

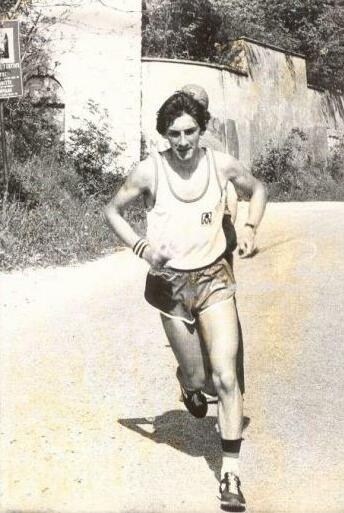
- Men's winner Orlando Pizzolato.
- Date: 28 October
- Location: (United States) New York City, NY
- Event type: Marathon
- Distance: 42.195 km
- Edition: 15th
- Course records: 2:08:12 (1981 men); 2:25:29 (1981 women)
- Website: Official website

The 1984 New York City Marathon was the 15th edition of the New York City Marathon and took place in New York City on 28 October.

== Results ==
=== Men ===
Rank	Athlete	Country	Time
1	Orlando Pizzolato	Italy	2:14:53
2	David Murphy	United Kingdom	2:15:36
3	Herbert Steffny	West Germany	2:16:22
4	Pat Petersen	United States	2:16:35
5	Gianni Demadonna	Italy	2:17:05
6	Michael Spöttel	West Germany	2:17:11
7	Antoni Niemczak	Poland	2:17:34
8	Nicholas Brawn	United Kingdom	2:17:42
9	Ahmed Mohamed Ismail	Somalia	2:18:16
10	Zackariah Barie	Tanzania	2:18:27
11	Ryszard Marczak	Poland	2:18.29
12	Mehmet Terzi	Turkey	2:19.12
13	Jukka Toivola	Finland	2:19.18
14	Lindsay Robertson	Scotland	2:20.09
15	Mohammed Rutiginga	Tanzania	2:20.29
16	Mats Erixon	Sweden	2:20.38
17	David J Clark	Scotland	2:21.04
18	Johan Geirnaert	Belgium	2:21.09
19	Kjeld Johnsen	Denmark	2:21.16
20	Larry Barthlow	United States	2:21.39
21	Pedro Rodríguez	Spain	2:21.52
22	Alfonso Abellan	Spain	2:22.01
23	James Ashworth	England	2:22.14
24	Lou Supino	United States	2:22.57
25	Zoltan Kiss	Hungary	2:22.59

=== Women ===
Rank	Athlete	Country	Time
1	Grete Waitz	Norway	2:29:30
2	Veronique Marot	United Kingdom	2:33:58
3	Laura Fogli	Italy	2:37:25
4	Lizanne Bussières	Canada	2:37:34
5	Judi St Hilaire	United States	2:37:49
6	Carey May	Ireland	2:38:11
7	Renata Walendziak	Poland	2:40:48
8	Charlotte Teske	West Germany	2:41:16
9	Rita Marchisio	Italy	2:41:18
10	Laura Albers	United States	2:42:12
11	Gabriela Andersen-Schiess	Switzerland	2:42.24
12	Gillian Horovitz	England	2:43.27
13	Mary O'Connor	New Zealand	2:45.00
14	Evy Palm	Sweden	2:45.18
15	Linda Begley	United States	2:45.27
16	Joyce Smith	England	2:46.17
17	Caroll Myers	United States	2:46.25
18	Daniela Tiberti	Italy	2:46.59
19	Paola Moro	Italy	2:47.17
20	Deirdre O'Farrelly	Ireland	2:47.56
21	Kiki Sweigart	United States	2:48.11
22	Sissel Grottenberg	Norway	2:50.44
23	Chantal Langlacé	France	2:51.59
24	Birgit Lennartz	West Germany	2:52.39
25	Carol Gould	England	2:54.47
