= Athletics at the Friendship Games – Women's marathon =

The women's marathon event at the Friendship Games was held on 18 August 1984 at the Evžen Rošický Stadium in Prague, Czechoslovakia. The start and finish line were in the Výstaviště Praha (then known as Park kultury an oddechu Julia Fučíka).

== Results ==
Rank	Name	Nationality	Time	Notes
1st place, gold medalist(s)	Zoya Ivanova	Soviet Union	2:33:44	
2nd place, silver medalist(s)	Lucia Belyayeva	Soviet Union	2:33:54	
3rd place, bronze medalist(s)	Raisa Smekhnova	Soviet Union	2:33:59	
–	Nadezhda Usmanova	Soviet Union	2:36:33	
–	Yelena Tsukhlo	Soviet Union	2:38:20	
4	Karolina Szabó	Hungary	2:41:51	
5	Ľudmila Melicherová	Czechoslovakia	2:43:21	
6	Gabriela Górzyńska	Poland	2:44:00	
7	Ilona Zsilak	Hungary	2:47:34	
8	Antónia Ladányiné	Hungary	2:52:52	
9	Helena Bidmonová	Czechoslovakia	2:54:33	
	Radka Naplatanova	Bulgaria	DNF	
	Ágnes Sipka	Hungary	DNF	
	Anna Król	Poland	DNF	
	Jarmila Urbanová	Czechoslovakia	DNF	
	Věra Stanovská	Czechoslovakia	DNF	

== See also ==
- Athletics at the 1984 Summer Olympics – Women's marathon
