= 1983 Chicago Marathon =

Footrace held in Chicago, Illinois

7th Chicago Marathon
- Venue: Chicago, United States
- Dates: October 16

Champions
- Men: Joseph Nzau (2:09:44.3)
- Women: Rosa Mota (2:31:12)

The 1983 Chicago Marathon was the seventh running of the annual marathon race in Chicago, United States and was held on October 16. The elite men's race was won by Kenya's Joseph Nzau in a time of 2:09:44.3 hours and the women's race was won by Portugal's Rosa Mota in 2:31:12. Nzau edged Britain's Hugh Jones by half a second in a tight finish. A total of 5237 runners finished the race, an increase of nearly 600 from the previous year.

== Results ==
=== Men ===
Position	Athlete	Nationality	Time
1st place, gold medalist(s)	Joseph Nzau	Kenya	2:09:44.3
2nd place, silver medalist(s)	Hugh Jones	United Kingdom	2:09:44.8
3rd place, bronze medalist(s)	Simon Kigen	Kenya	2:10:51
4	Agapius Masong	Tanzania	2:11:57
5	Christoph Herle	West Germany	2:12:15
6	Gianni Poli	Italy	2:12:34
7	Thomas Raunig	United States	2:12:55
8	Gabriel Kamau	Kenya	2:14:20
9	Jeff Wells	United States	2:15:45
10	Henrik Jørgensen	Denmark	2:15:59
11	Giuseppe Moretti	Italy	2:16:24
12	Matt Wilson	United States	2:17:10
13	Bill McClement	United States	2:17:23
14	Greg Meyer	United States	2:17:34
15	Hank Pfeifle	United States	2:17:46
16	Joseph Sheeran	United States	2:17:51
17	Duncan Macdonald	United States	2:18:03
18	John Halberstadt	South Africa	2:18:24
19	Mervyn Brameld	United Kingdom	2:18:29
20	Mark Stickley	United States	2:18:49
—	Steve Jones	United Kingdom	DNF

=== Women ===
Position	Athlete	Nationality	Time
1st place, gold medalist(s)	Rosa Mota	Portugal	2:31:12
2nd place, silver medalist(s)	Jacqueline Gareau	Canada	2:31:36
3rd place, bronze medalist(s)	Dorthe Rasmussen	Denmark	2:31:45
4	Anne Audain	New Zealand	2:32:15
5	Karen Dunn	United States	2:34:24
6	Lisa Rainsberger	United States	2:34:55
7	Anna Marie Malone	Canada	2:36:23
8	Nancy Conz	United States	2:36:44
9	Rita Marchisio	Italy	2:37:29
10	Carol McLatchie	United States	2:37:57
11	Linda Begley	United States	2:39:21
12	Joyce Smith	United Kingdom	2:39:43
13	Jeanne Lasee	United States	2:41:36
14	Ria Van Landeghem	Belgium	2:42:22
15	Bev Docherty	United States	2:44:34
16	Karen Bukowski	United States	2:44:57
17	Susan Lupica	United States	2:45:29
18	Kellie Archuletta	United States	2:48:01
19	Cynthia Lorenzoni	United States	2:48:01
20	Kathy Molitor	United States	2:49:52
—	Laura Fogli	Italy	DNF
