= 1983 World Championships in Athletics – Women's marathon =

Long-distance running race at the 1983 World Championships in Athletics

Women's marathon at the 1983 World Championships
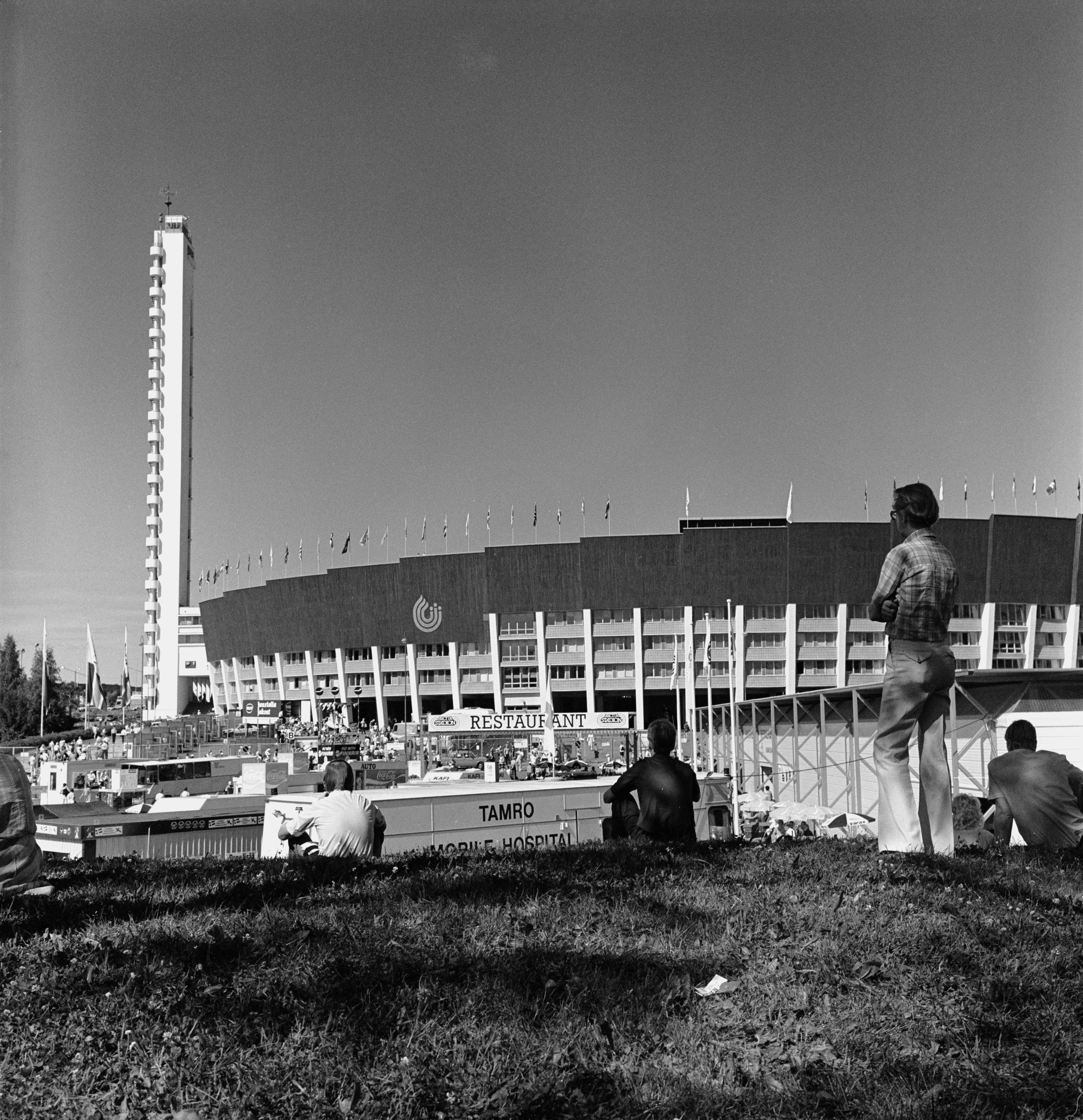
- The marathon started and finished at the Olympic Stadium
- Venue: Helsinki Olympic Stadium
- Date: 7 August 1983
- Competitors: 63 from 31 nations
- Winning time: 2:28:09

Medalists
gold medal	Grete Waitz	Norway
silver medal	Marianne Dickerson	United States
bronze medal	Raisa Smekhnova	Soviet Union

The women's marathon was one of the road events at the 1983 World Championships in Athletics in Helsinki, Finland. It took place on 7 August 1983, starting and finishing at the Helsinki Olympic Stadium. The race was won by Norway's Grete Waitz in 2:28:09, ahead of Marianne Dickerson of the United States in second and the Soviet Union's Raisa Smekhnova in third.

In warm conditions, Rumiko Kaneko of Japan and Ireland's Carey May led in the early stages, before Jacqueline Gareau of Canada took over, trailed by a pack of runners which included two of the favourites, Waitz and Julie Brown. Ireland's Regina Joyce took the lead by the 12-mile (19 km) point and opened a gap of around 30 seconds ahead of the chasing group. After 19 miles (31 km), she was caught by a group led by Waitz, who was increasing the pace of the race. Gradually those running with her dropped back, leaving her to win the race by three minutes. Smekhnova was just ahead of Dickerson when they entered the stadium, but was passed by the American in a sprint finish.

== Background ==
The women's marathon was not an established event at an international level. It had not featured in the Olympic Games and had only become popular during the 1970s. Historically, some experts claimed that running the marathon distance, 26 miles 385 yards (42.195 km), was dangerous for women's health. As it gained prominence through the 1970s, there were calls for it to be added to the Olympics, though there was significant opposition. The governing body for athletics, the International Association of Athletics Federations (IAAF, now World Athletics) announced that it would be added to the programme for the inaugural World Championships in Athletics in 1983, making it the first global championships to feature a women's marathon. (Note: A women's marathon had also been included in the 1982 European Athletics Championships.)

In 1983, an American runner, Joan Benoit, established a new fastest time for the women's marathon, when she ran 2:22:43 at the 1983 Boston Marathon; cutting almost three minutes off the previous fastest time, held jointly by Allison Roe of New Zealand and Norway's Grete Waitz. Of the three, only Waitz was taking part in the World Championships: Benoit did not run in the Avon International Marathon in Los Angeles, which the United States used as a qualifying race, choosing to focus on shorter distances instead. In Benoit's absence, The Observer and The Times described Waitz as the favourite for the race. The American press rated Julie Brown as their best chance of victory in the race; writing in the Hartford Courant, Amby Burfoot said that despite the fact Waitz had beaten Brown in their previous meetings, Brown had "recently brought a new maturity to her road racing".

The race started at the Helsinki Olympic Stadium, and moved onto the streets of Helsinki, following an undulating course that Brown suggested would prevent fast times. The course passed Helsinki's docks, looped around the shore road, and past Market Square. After looping through downtown Helsinki, they returned to the stadium along the same route, to finish on the track.

== Summary ==
The race started at 15:05 local time on 7 August 1983, the opening day of the Championships, in clear, dry conditions, with temperatures of around 21 °C (70 °F). Early on, Japan's Rumiko Kaneko and Ireland's Carey May led, passing the 3.1 miles (5 km) mark in 18:14. Canada's Jacqueline Gareau then established a small lead, passing the 6.2-mile (10 km) mark in 36:13, around 20 yards (18 m) ahead of a pack which included: Waitz of Norway; all three United States runners, Marianne Dickerson, Debbie Eide and Brown; Rosa Mota of Portugal; Italy's Laura Fogli and May from Ireland. Two miles (3.2 km) later, Gareau still led, and the pack behind her had grown to include 13 runners. David Miller, a journalist for The Times, criticised her inexperience in pressing ahead too early, but Gareau said it was the only way she could secure a good finishing position. Her lead, which peaked at around 30 seconds, was eroded and she was passed by Ireland's Regina Joyce between 10 and 12 miles (16 and 19 km) into the race. Waitz asked Brown if she thought they should go with her, but Brown said no: "She'll come back to us".

Joyce, who had also opened up a lead of 30 seconds at one stage, led the race until the 19-mile (31 km) mark, when a surge from Waitz broke up the chasing group, and she led a smaller pack of five runners at the front. Along with Waitz were two Soviet athletes, Lyutsia Belyayeva and Raisa Smekhnova, Dickerson and Joyce. Running into the wind, they formed a single-file procession behind Waitz. Two miles (3.2 km) later, Waitz was clear at the front; Smekhnova had tried to stay with her for as long as possible, but Waitz continued to extend her lead. Brown was unable to match the leaders' pace from around the 20-mile (32 km) stage due to an Achilles injury and dropped out of the race completely three miles later. Behind, Joyce had dropped out of medal contention when she had to stop for a toilet break, leaving Dickerson to vie with Smekhnova for second place. The American athlete was around 130 yards (120 m) behind Smekhnova with 3.2 miles (5.1 km) of the race remaining, but was closing the gap. Waitz won the race in 2:28:09 and had time to complete a victory lap before Smekhnova narrowly led Dickerson as they entered the stadium. Dickerson had enough energy left for a sprint finish, and passed Smekhnova on the bend of the track, and finished second in 2:31:09, exactly three minutes behind Weitz, and four seconds ahead of Smekhnova, who claimed the bronze medal. Mota finished in fourth, while the early race leader, Gareau, placed fifth. Waitz, who was running her first female-only race, said that the makeup of the race changed her tactics significantly, as there were no men around her to share the pacing responsibilities: "Here, the final time didn't really matter. The idea was to win the Championship."

== Results ==
Results
Rank	Name	Nationality	Time	Notes
1st place, gold medalist(s)	Grete Waitz	Norway	2:28:09	
2nd place, silver medalist(s)	Marianne Dickerson	United States	2:31:09	
3rd place, bronze medalist(s)	Raisa Smekhnova	Soviet Union	2:31:13	NR
4	Rosa Mota	Portugal	2:31:50	
5	Jacqueline Gareau	Canada	2:32:35	
6	Laura Fogli	Italy	2:33:31	
7	Regina Joyce	Ireland	2:33:52	
8	Tuija Toivonen	Finland	2:34:14	NR
9	Joyce Smith	Great Britain & N.I.	2:34:27	
10	Lyutsia Belyayeva	Soviet Union	2:34:44	
11	Rita Marchisio	Italy	2:35:08	
12	Debbie Eide	United States	2:36:17	
13	Carey May	Ireland	2:36:28	
14	Glenys Quick	New Zealand	2:37:14	
15	Monika Lövenich	West Germany	2:39:19	
16	Marja Vartiainen	Finland	2:39:22	
17	Carla Beurskens	Netherlands	2:39:25	
18	Karolina Szabó	Hungary	2:40:23	
19	Christa Vahlensieck	West Germany	2:40:43	
20	Magda Ilands	Belgium	2:40:52	
21	Cindy Hamilton	Canada	2:41:27	
22	Kathryn Binns	Great Britain & N.I.	2:42:12	
23	Zoya Ivanova	Soviet Union	2:43:27	
24	Ngaire Drake	New Zealand	2:43:51	
25	Jill Colwell	Australia	2:45:07	
26	Jackie Turney	Australia	2:45:43	
27	Sinikka Keskitalo	Finland	2:46:10	
28	Dorothy Goertzen	Canada	2:46:38	
29	Kersti Jacobsen	Denmark	2:46:48	
30	Ilona Zsilak	Hungary	2:46:48	
31	Mieko Tajima	Japan	2:47:10	
32	Tuulikki Raisanen	Sweden	2:47:29	
33	Jarmila Urbanova	Czechoslovakia	2:48:28	
34	Mary O'Connor	New Zealand	2:48:44	
35	Yuko Gordon	Hong Kong	2:48:51	
36	Zehava Shmueli	Israel	2:49:07	
37	Mette Holm-Hansen	Denmark	2:49:43	
37	Lone Dybdahl	Denmark	2:49:43	
39	Megan Sloane	Australia	2:51:11	
40	Elizabeth Oberli-Schuh	Venezuela	2:51:30	
41	Evy Palm	Sweden	2:51:49	
42	Heidi Jacobsen	Norway	2:52:51	
43	Midde Hamrin	Sweden	2:52:53	
44	Deirdre Foreman-Nagle	Ireland	2:53:07	
45	Iciar Martínez	Spain	2:53:24	
46	Rita Borralho	Portugal	2:53:41	
47	Oddrun Hovsengen	Norway	2:54:04	
48	Maria-Luisa Ronquillo	Mexico	2:56:33	
49	Rumiko Kaneko	Japan	2:58:53	
50	Son Yong-Hi	North Korea	2:59:10	
51	Kim Myong-Suk	North Korea	3:12:41	
–	Julie Brown	United States	DNF	
–	Yueh-Mei Kao	Chinese Taipei	DNF	
–	Wu Jinmei	China	DNF	
–	Kandasamy Jayamani	Singapore	DNF	
–	Chantal Langlacé	France	DNF	
–	Yupin Lohachart	Thailand	DNF	
–	Alba Milana	Italy	DNF	
–	Charlotte Teske	West Germany	DNF	
–	Marie-Christine Deurbroeck	Belgium	DNS	
–	Glynis Penny	Great Britain & N.I.	DNS	
–	Chu Winnie Ng Lai	Hong Kong	DNS	
–	Amy Cesaretti	San Marino	DNS	

== See also ==
- 1982 European Athletics Championships – Women's marathon
- Athletics at the 1984 Summer Olympics – Women's marathon
- 1986 European Athletics Championships – Women's marathon
