= 1982 European Athletics Championships – Women's marathon =

Women's marathon at the European Athletics Championships

These are the official results of the Women's marathon at the 1982 European Championships in Athens, Greece. The race was held on 12 September 1982. This was the first time that women's marathon was featured at a major athletics competition.

== Medalists ==
Gold	Rosa Mota; Portugal (POR)
Silver	Laura Fogli; Italy (ITA)
Bronze	Ingrid Kristiansen; Norway (NOR)

== Abbreviations ==
- All times shown are in hours:minutes:seconds

DNS	did not start
NM	no mark
WR	world record
AR	area record
NR	national record
PB	personal best
SB	season best

== Final ranking ==
Rank	Athlete	Time	Note
1st place, gold medalist(s)	Rosa Mota (POR)	2:36:03	
2nd place, silver medalist(s)	Laura Fogli (ITA)	2:36:28	
3rd place, bronze medalist(s)	Ingrid Kristiansen (NOR)	2:36:38	
4	Alba Milana (ITA)	2:38:54	
5	Carla Beurskens (NED)	2:39:22	
6	Karolina Szabó (HUN)	2:40:50	
7	Midde Hamrin (SWE)	2:42:14	
8	Zoya Ivanova (URS)	2:42:43	
9	Kathryn Binns (GBR)	2:44:09	
10	Rita Marchisio (ITA)	2:44:24	
11	Monika Lövenich (FRG)	2:45:10	
12	Charlotte Teske (FRG)	2:45:17	
13	Heidi Hutterer (FRG)	2:46:32	
14	Tuija Toivonen (FIN)	2:48:51	
15	Sinikka Kiippa (FIN)	2:48:54	
16	Henriette Fina (AUT)	2:49:57	
17	Christine Seeman (FRA)	2:51:58	
18	Carey May (IRL)	2:52:06	
19	Vreni Forster (SUI)	2:52:49	
20	Nadezhda Gumerova (URS)	2:53:00	
21	Carol Gould (GBR)	2:58:48	
22	Georgia Papanastasiou (GRE)	3:18:40	
23	Kyriaki Kouvara (GRE)	3:28:53	
DID NOT FINISH (DNF)
—	Iclar Martínez (ESP)	DNF	
—	Annick Lebreton (FRA)	DNF	
—	Magda Ilands (BEL)	DNF	
—	Yelena Tsukhlo (URS)	DNF	

== Participation ==
According to an unofficial count, 27 athletes from 17 countries participated in the event.

- Austria (1)
- Belgium (1)
- Finland (2)
- France (2)
- Greece (2)
- Hungary (1)
- Ireland (1)
- Italy (3)
- Netherlands (1)
- Norway (1)
- Portugal (1)
- Soviet Union (3)
- Spain (1)
- Sweden (1)
- Switzerland (1)
- United Kingdom (2)
- West Germany (3)

== See also ==
- 1982 Marathon Year Ranking
- 1983 Women's World Championships Marathon (Helsinki)
- 1984 Women's Olympic Marathon (Los Angeles)
- 1987 Women's World Championships Marathon (Rome)
- 1988 Women's Olympic Marathon (Seoul)
