= 1986 European Athletics Championships – Women's marathon =

Women's marathon at the European Athletics Championships

These are the official results of the Women's marathon at the 1986 European Championships in Stuttgart, West Germany. The race was held on 30 August 1986.

== Medalists ==
Gold	Rosa Mota; Portugal (POR)
Silver	Laura Fogli; Italy (ITA)
Bronze	Yekaterina Khramenkova; Soviet Union (URS)

== Abbreviations ==
- All times shown are in hours:minutes:seconds

DNS	did not start
NM	no mark
WR	world record
AR	area record
NR	national record
PB	personal best
SB	season best

== Final ranking ==
Rank	Athlete	Time	Note
1st place, gold medalist(s)	Rosa Mota (POR)	2:28:38	CR
2nd place, silver medalist(s)	Laura Fogli (ITA)	2:32:52	
3rd place, bronze medalist(s)	Yekaterina Khramenkova (URS)	2:34:14	
4	Sinikka Keskitalo (FIN)	2:34:31	
5	Jocelyne Villeton (FRA)	2:35:17	
6	Bente Moe (NOR)	2:35:34	
7	Carla Beurskens (NED)	2:39:05	
8	Paola Moro (ITA)	2:39:19	
9	Maria Rebelo-Lelut (FRA)	2:40:20	
10	Agnes Pardaens (BEL)	2:40:33	
11	Mercedes Calleja (ESP)	2:40:46	
12	Genoveva Eichenmann (SUI)	2:41:54	
13	Rita Marchisio (ITA)	2:42:06	
14	Jeanette Nordgren-Ling (SWE)	2:42:39	
15	Luzia Sahli (SUI)	2:42:54	
16	Solveig Harrysson (SWE)	2:43:16	
17	Irina Bogachova (URS)	2:43:30	
18	Sylviane Geffray (FRA)	2:43:34	
19	Sirkku Kumpulainen (FIN)	2:45:26	
20	Ágnes Sipka (HUN)	2:45:36	
21	Grażyna Mierzejewska (POL)	2:45:36	
22	Helen Comsa (SUI)	2:50:13	
23	Linda Delvaux (LUX)	2:52:07	
DID NOT FINISH (DNF)
—	Véronique Marot (GBR)	DNF	
—	Rita Borralho (POR)	DNF	
—	María Luisa Irizar (ESP)	DNF	
—	Gabriela Górzyńska (POL)	DNF	
—	Heidi Hutterer (FRG)	DNF	
—	Kersti Jakobsen (DEN)	DNF	
—	Katrin Dörre (GDR)	DNF	
—	Nadezhda Gumerova (URS)	DNF	

== Participation ==
According to an unofficial count, 31 athletes from 18 countries participated in the event.

- Belgium (1)
- Denmark (1)
- East Germany (1)
- Finland (2)
- France (3)
- Hungary (1)
- Italy (3)
- Luxembourg (1)
- Netherlands (1)
- Norway (1)
- Poland (2)
- Portugal (2)
- Soviet Union (3)
- Spain (2)
- Sweden (2)
- Switzerland (3)
- United Kingdom (1)
- West Germany (1)

== See also ==
- 1983 Women's World Championships Marathon (Helsinki)
- 1984 Women's Olympic Marathon (Los Angeles)
- 1986 Marathon Year Ranking
- 1987 Women's World Championships Marathon (Rome)
- 1988 Women's Olympic Marathon (Seoul)
