= Marianne Dickerson =

American long-distance runner

Personal information
- Born: November 14, 1960 St. Joseph, Illinois, United States
- Died: October 14, 2015 (aged 54)
- Education: University of Illinois '83; University of Michigan '84; Harvard Business School

Sport
- Sport: Athletics
- Event: Marathon

Achievements and titles
- Personal best: 2:31:09
Medal record
Women's athletics
Representing the United States
World Championships
Silver medal – second place	1983 Helsinki	Marathon

Marianne Dickerson (November 14, 1960 – October 14, 2015) was an American long-distance runner.

== Personal life ==
Dickerson was born in St. Joseph, Illinois.

== NCAA ==
She was a star runner first at St. Joseph-Ogden High School, then at the University of Illinois after a stint on a track scholarship to the University of Michigan. (She earned a bachelor's in general engineering from the University of Illinois and a master's in industrial engineering from the University of Michigan). November, 1980: UI cross country's Marianne Dickerson placed first at the AIAW state meet.November 1982: In the first-ever Big Ten women's cross country championship meet, Marianne Dickerson earned first-team All-Big Ten honors with a sixth-place finish. in 1983 after also earning All-American status in the 10,000m, placing third, at NCAA Division I Women's Outdoor Track and Field Championships.

== Professional ==
Against the advice of her coach, she entered a Missouri race, a portion of the inaugural Avon Marathon series. Winning the race qualified her for the series championship in Los Angeles, where she placed second behind Julie Brown.

That race served as the qualifier to the World Championships. She was a surprise to take the silver medal at the 1983 World Championships in Helsinki, Finland. While Grete Waitz was a clear winner, Dickerson was in fourth place behind Rosa Mota and Raisa Smekhnova, that group having already dispatched stars Joyce Smith, Laura Fogli and Christa Vahlensieck. Dickerson passed Mota outside the stadium then surged to dramatically beat Smekhnova (a sub-4 minute 1500m runner) on the track inside the stadium.

Injuries prevented her from competing in the 1984 Olympic Trials. She qualified for the 1988 trials by winning the Baltimore Marathon, but faded in the middle of those trials.

After getting her degree in engineering, she went to the Harvard Business School. In 2015, she returned to her alma-mater high school as an assistant coach before her death.

== Achievements ==
- All results regarding marathon, unless stated otherwise

Year	Competition	Venue	Position	Notes
Representing the United States
1983	Los Angeles Marathon	Los Angeles, California	2nd	2:33:45
1983	World Championships	Helsinki, Finland	2nd	2:31:09
1988	Baltimore Marathon	Baltimore, United States	1st	2:41:05
