= St. Joseph, Illinois =

St. Joseph
- Village
- Saint Joseph
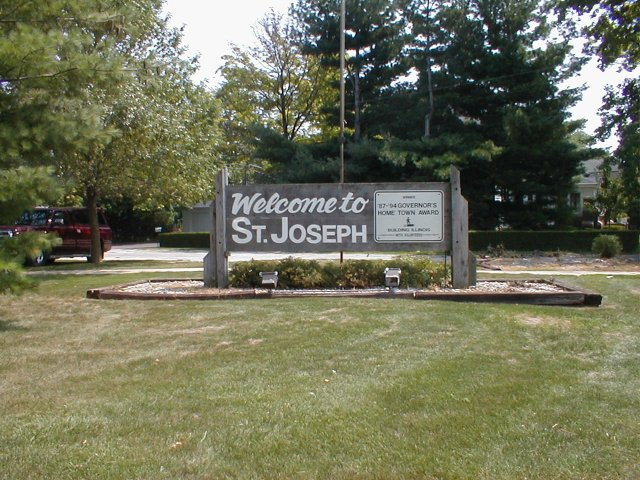
- The welcome sign coming in the north side of the village.

- Location of St. Joseph in Champaign County, Illinois.

- Location within Champaign County St. Joseph (Illinois)
- Coordinates: 40°06′51″N 88°02′08″W
- Country: United States
- State: Illinois
- County: Champaign
- Founded: April 28, 1881

Area
  - Total: 2.10 sq mi (5.44 km^{2})
  - Land: 2.08 sq mi (5.39 km^{2})
  - Water: 0.015 sq mi (0.04 km^{2})
- Elevation: 673 ft (205 m)

Population (2020)
  - Total: 3,810
  - Density: 1,829.5/sq mi (706.38/km^{2})
- Time zone: UTC-6 (CST)
  - Summer (DST): UTC-5 (CDT)
- ZIP Code: 61873
- Area code: 217
- FIPS code: 17-66950
- GNIS feature ID: 2399166
- Website: www.stjosephillinois.org

The Village of St. Joseph or Saint Joseph was founded on April 28, 1881, and is located in St. Joseph Township, Champaign County, Illinois, United States. The population was 3,810 at the 2020 census, a decline from the figure of 3,967 in 2010.

== Geography ==
According to the 2021 census gazetteer files, St. Joseph has a total area of 2.10 square miles (5.44 km^{2}), of which 2.08 square miles (5.39 km^{2}) (or 99.24%) is land and 0.02 square miles (0.05 km^{2}) (or 0.76%) is water.

== Demographics ==
Historical population
Census	Pop.	Note	%±
1880	328		—
1890	552		68.3%
1900	637		15.4%
1910	681		6.9%
1920	772		13.4%
1930	777		0.6%
1940	810		4.2%
1950	941		16.2%
1960	1,210		28.6%
1970	1,554		28.4%
1980	1,900		22.3%
1990	2,052		8.0%
2000	2,912		41.9%
2010	3,967		36.2%
2020	3,810		−4.0%
U.S. Decennial Census

=== 2020 census ===
As of the 2020 census, St. Joseph had a population of 3,810. The median age was 37.9 years. 28.5% of residents were under the age of 18 and 14.0% of residents were 65 years of age or older. For every 100 females there were 93.1 males, and for every 100 females age 18 and over there were 86.8 males age 18 and over.

There were 1,086 families in the village. The population density was 1,815.15 inhabitants per square mile (700.83/km^{2}). There were 1,519 housing units at an average density of 723.68 per square mile (279.41/km^{2}), of which 4.3% were vacant. The homeowner vacancy rate was 0.9% and the rental vacancy rate was 5.7%.

0.0% of residents lived in urban areas, while 100.0% lived in rural areas.

There were 1,454 households in St. Joseph, of which 39.9% had children under the age of 18 living in them. Of all households, 59.1% were married-couple households, 11.6% were households with a male householder and no spouse or partner present, and 24.6% were households with a female householder and no spouse or partner present. About 23.0% of all households were made up of individuals and 11.2% had someone living alone who was 65 years of age or older. The average household size was 3.33 and the average family size was 2.78.

The village's age distribution included 5.1% from 18 to 24, 24.3% from 25 to 44, and 26.7% from 45 to 64.

Racial composition as of the 2020 census
Race	Number	Percent
White	3,516	92.3%
Black or African American	17	0.4%
American Indian and Alaska Native	10	0.3%
Asian	38	1.0%
Native Hawaiian and Other Pacific Islander	0	0.0%
Some other race	44	1.2%
Two or more races	185	4.9%
Hispanic or Latino (of any race)	115	3.0%

=== Income and poverty ===
The median income for a household in the village was $93,621, and the median income for a family was $105,526. Males had a median income of $56,065 versus $49,076 for females. The per capita income for the village was $35,292. About 2.5% of families and 5.2% of the population were below the poverty line, including 2.9% of those under age 18 and 16.3% of those age 65 or over.

== Education ==
The public high school for this community is St. Joseph-Ogden High School, a school that combines students graduating from St. Joseph Middle School with students graduating from Prairieview-Ogden Junior High, with the majority of students coming from the St. Joseph area. Not all students within Prairieview-Ogden Junior High's district are within the high school's district. Some of these students fall within the borders of the Rantoul, Illinois or Thomasboro, Illinois high school districts instead.

== Notable people ==
- Frank Hanly, 26th Governor of Indiana, was born in St. Joseph.
- Marianne Dickerson, a world-class long-distance runner, lived in St. Joseph.
