= Genoveva Eichenmann =

Swiss long-distance runner

Genoveva Eichenmann (born September 12, 1957) is a retired female long-distance runner from Switzerland. She set her personal best (2:34:43) in the marathon on April 24, 1988 in Zürich.

== Achievements ==
Year	Competition	Venue	Position	Event	Notes
Representing Switzerland
1986	European Championships	Stuttgart, West Germany	12th	Marathon	2:41:54
1986	New York City Marathon	New York City, United States	18th	Marathon	2:40:46
1987	World Championships	Rome, Italy	18th	Marathon	2:43:07
1988	Olympic Games	Seoul, South Korea	47th	Marathon	2:44:37
