= Sinikka Keskitalo =

Finnish long-distance runner

Sinikka Marja-Liisa Keskitalo (29 January 1951 – 25 October 2011) was a female long-distance runner from Finland. She competed in the women's marathon for her native country at two consecutive Summer Olympics, starting in 1984. Her best result was the 15th place at the 1984 Summer Olympics in Los Angeles, California. She was born in Jalasjärvi.

== Achievements ==
Year	Competition	Venue	Position	Event	Notes
Representing Finland
1982	European Championships	Athens, Greece	15th	Marathon	2:48:54
1983	World Championships	Helsinki, Finland	27th	Marathon	2:46:10
1984	Olympic Games	Los Angeles, United States	15th	Marathon	2:35:15
1986	European Championships	Stuttgart, West Germany	4th	Marathon	2:34:31
1987	World Championships	Rome, Italy	8th	Marathon	2:35:16
1988	Olympic Games	Seoul, South Korea	42nd	Marathon	2:43:00
