= Bente Moe =

Norwegian long-distance runner

Bente Moe (born 2 December 1960) is a retired Norwegian long-distance runner who specialized in the marathon race. She represented SK Vidar.

In the marathon she finished 26th at the 1984 Summer Olympics, sixth at the 1986 European Championships and fourth at the 1987 World Championships. She ran at the 1988 Summer Olympics without finishing, and also competed at the World Cross Country Championships in 1988 and 1989 without any success. She became Norwegian champion in marathon in 1991.

== Personal bests ==
- 10,000 metres - 32:59.68 min (1987) - ninth among Norwegian 10,000 m runners.
- Half marathon - 1:11:54 hrs (1988) - eighth among Norwegian half marathon runners.
- Marathon - 2:32:36 hrs (1988) - sixth among Norwegian marathon runners.

== Achievements ==
Year	Competition	Venue	Position	Event	Notes
Representing Norway
1984	Olympic Games	Los Angeles, United States	26th	Marathon	2:40:52
1986	European Championships	Stuttgart, West Germany	6th	Marathon	2:35:34
1987	Houston Marathon	Houston, United States	1st	Marathon	2:32:37
1987	World Championships	Rome, Italy	4th	Marathon	2:33:21
1988	Olympic Games	Seoul, South Korea	—	Marathon	DNF
1992	Frankfurt Marathon	Frankfurt, Germany	1st	Marathon	2:32:36
1993	Vienna Marathon	Vienna, Austria	1st	Marathon	2:38:21
