= 1987 World Championships in Athletics – Women's marathon =

Long distance running race at the 1987 World Championships in Athletics

Women's marathon at the 1987 World Championships
- Venue: Stadio Olimpico, Rome
- Date: 29 August 1987
- Competitors: 42 from 27 nations
- Winning time: 2:25:17

Medalists
| gold medal | Rosa Mota | Portugal |
| silver medal | Zoya Ivanova | Soviet Union |
| bronze medal | Jocelyne Villeton | France |

The women's marathon was one of the road events at the 1987 World Championships in Athletics in Rome, Italy. It took place on 29 August 1987; the course started and finished at the Stadio Olimpico and passed several of Rome's historic landmarks. The race was won by Portugal's Rosa Mota in 2:25:17, a new championship record, ahead of Zoya Ivanova of the Soviet Union in second and France's Jocelyne Villeton in third.

In warm conditions, the pre-race favourite, Mota, led from the start. Another of the runners expected to do well, Australia's Lisa Martin, was suffering from fatigue after working too hard in training, and she pulled out of the race after 25 kilometres (16 mi). Mota won the race by 7 minutes 21 seconds, but did not initially realise that she had finished the race, as she thought she still had to run another lap of the track in the stadium. As of 2024, this is the only time the women's marathon has been won by more than three minutes at these championships.

== Background ==
The race started and finished at the Stadio Olimpico, and largely stayed within the area of central Rome enclosed by the Aurelian Walls. It skirted around the lower edges of three of the seven hills of Rome without climbing any of them, and passed several ancient landmarks, including the Colosseum, the Baths of Caracalla and St. Peter's Square. Part of the course ran along cobbled streets, which along with the warm temperatures forecast, led to expectations that there would not be fast times in the race.

Several of the world's quickest female marathoners were absent from the race. Ingrid Kristiansen, who was the world record holder, having run the 1985 London Marathon in 2:21:06, opted to run the 10,000 metres instead. Joan Benoit, the Olympic champion, was also missing, as she was pregnant. Grete Waitz, the reigning world champion suffered a suspected stress fracture in her foot after running a 5,000-metre time-trial on 15 August, and although she travelled to Rome and considered running with painkillers, she decided not to take the risk, and withdrew. In their absence, the favourites were Rosa Mota of Portugal and Australia's Lisa Martin. Mota was a two-time European champion, and the third quickest female marathoner, while Martin had run the fifth fastest women's marathon time. Both came into the Championships in less than ideal situations: Mota had been suffering from a urinary tract infection, while training in Florida, Martin had overtrained in hot conditions.

== Summary ==
The race started at 16:55 local time on 29 August 1987, the opening day of the Championships, in temperatures of around 27 °C (80 °F). Mota took the lead before the marathon left the stadium, and extended it as the race progressed. She completed the first half of the marathon in 1:12:10, and won by over seven minutes. When she crossed the finish line, in 2:25:17, she continued running, as she thought she had another lap to complete. It was only when a race official flagged her down 30 metres (98 ft) into her second lap, telling her that she had finished, that she stopped. She blamed her mistake on the instructions she had received before the race: "an official told me I had to take two loops of the track". Mota's time was a new championship record, beating the 2:28:09 set by Grete Waitz at the 1983 marathon.

Martin, who was expected to be the most likely to challenge Mota in the race withdrew after 25 kilometres (16 mi); she was falling back down the field, and her whole body felt sore. She blamed it residual fatigue from the problems she had suffered during training in Florida. Martin was one of nine runners to pull out of the race. Zoya Ivanova of the Soviet Union finished in second, in 2:32:38, while France's Jocelyne Villeton claimed bronze, in 2:32:53.

== Aftermath ==
At the 1988 Olympics, Mota beat Martin by 13 seconds and became the only woman to be the reigning European, World, and Olympic champion simultaneously.

== Results ==
Results
| Rank | Name | Nationality | Time | Notes |
|---|---|---|---|---|
| 1st place, gold medalist(s) | Rosa Mota | Portugal | 2:25:17 | CR |
| 2nd place, silver medalist(s) | Zoya Ivanova | Soviet Union | 2:32:38 | |
| 3rd place, bronze medalist(s) | Jocelyne Villeton | France | 2:32:53 | |
| 4 | Bente Moe | Norway | 2:33:21 | |
| 5 | Yelena Tsukhlo | Soviet Union | 2:33:55 | |
| 6 | Yekaterina Khramenkova | Soviet Union | 2:34:23 | |
| 7 | Nancy Ditz | United States | 2:34:54 | |
| 8 | Sinikka Keskitalo | Finland | 2:35:16 | |
| 9 | Karolina Szabo | Hungary | 2:36:18 | |
| 10 | Miyuki Yamashita | Japan | 2:36:55 | |
| 11 | Angie Pain | Great Britain & N.I. | 2:38:12 | |
| 12 | Antonella Bizioli | Italy | 2:38:52 | |
| 13 | Mercedes Calleja | Spain | 2:38:58 | |
| 14 | Uta Pippig | East Germany | 2:39:30 | |
| 15 | Agnes Pardaens | Belgium | 2:39:52 | |
| 16 | Odette Lapierre | Canada | 2:40:20 | |
| 17 | Paula Fudge | Great Britain & N.I. | 2:42:42 | |
| 18 | Genoveva Eichenmann | Switzerland | 2:43:07 | |
| 19 | Maria Luisa Irizar | Spain | 2:43:54 | |
| 20 | Emma Scaunich | Italy | 2:44:32 | |
| 21 | Evy Palm | Sweden | 2:44:41 | |
| 22 | Veronique Marot | Great Britain & N.I. | 2:45:02 | |
| 23 | Gabriela Wolf | West Germany | 2:45:13 | |
| 24 | Christine Kennedy | Ireland | 2:45:47 | |
| 25 | Hazel Stewart | New Zealand | 2:48:41 | |
| 26 | Eriko Asai | Japan | 2:48:44 | |
| 27 | Marcianne Mukamurenzi | Rwanda | 2:49:38 | NR |
| 28 | Rita Borralho | Portugal | 2:52:26 | |
| 29 | Dorothy Goertzen | Canada | 2:53:11 | |
| 30 | Cornelia Melis | Aruba | 2:59:31 | |
| 31 | Gina Coello | Honduras | 3:01:53 | NR |
| 32 | Maria del Pilar | Guatemala | 3:16:20 | |
| 33 | Julie Ogborn | Guam | 3:50:56 | |
| – | Cathy Twomey | United States | DNF | |
| – | Lisa Martin | Australia | DNF | |
| – | Renata Kokowska | Poland | DNF | |
| – | Kim Jones | United States | DNF | |
| – | Maria Rebelo | France | DNF | |
| – | Rita Marchisio | Italy | DNF | |
| – | Monika Schäfer | West Germany | DNF | |
| – | Angélica de Almeida | Brazil | DNF | |
| – | Susan Stone | Canada | DNF | |

== See also ==
- 1984 Women's Olympic Marathon (Los Angeles)
- 1986 Women's European Championships Marathon (Stuttgart)
- 1988 Women's Olympic Marathon (Seoul)
- 1990 Women's European Championships Marathon (Split)
