= Yekaterina Khramenkova =

Medal record

Women's athletics

Representing Soviet Union

European Championships
Bronze medal – third place	1986 Stuttgart	Marathon

Yekaterina Khramenkova (Belarusian: Кацярына Храменкава; born October 16, 1956) is a retired long-distance runner from Belarus, best known for winning the bronze medal for the Soviet Union in the women's marathon at the 1986 European Championships (Stuttgart, West Germany). She was the winner of the 1992 Madrid Marathon. She is the Belarusian record holder in the 10,000 metres and 10 km.

== Achievements ==
Year	Competition	Venue	Position	Event	Notes
Representing Soviet Union
1986	European Championships	Stuttgart, West Germany	3rd	Marathon	2:34:14
1987	World Championships	Rome, Italy	6th	Marathon	2:34:23
1990	European Championships	Split, SFR Yugoslavia	—	Marathon	DNF
Representing Belarus
1992	Madrid Marathon	Madrid, Spain	1st	Marathon	2:35:30
1992	Lisbon Marathon	Lisbon, Portugal	1st	Marathon	2:30:17
