= Paola Moro =

Italian long-distance runner

Personal information
- Nationality: Italian
- Born: August 14, 1952 (age 73) Bassano del Grappa, Italy

Sport
- Sport: Athletics
- Event: Long-distance running

Paola Moro (born 14 August 1952) is a retired female long-distance runner from Italy.

== Biography ==
She competed for her native country at the 1984 Summer Olympics in Los Angeles, California. There she ended up in 20th place in the women's marathon. Moro set her personal best in the classic distance (2:33.03) in 1984.

== Achievements ==
- All results regarding marathon, unless stated otherwise

Year	Competition	Venue	Position	Notes
Representing Italy
1984	Olympic Games	Los Angeles, United States	20th	2:37:06
1986	European Championships	Stuttgart, West Germany	8th	2:39:19
1986	Venice Marathon	Venice, Italy	1st	2:38:10
