= Tuija Toivonen =

Finnish long-distance runner

Personal information
- Born: 22 September 1958 (age 67) Elimäki, Finland

Sport
- Sport: Long-distance running

Tuija Sisko Annele Toivonen-Jousimaa (born 22 September 1958) is a retired female long-distance runner from Elimäki, Finland. She competed in the women's marathon for her native country at two consecutive Summer Olympics, starting in 1984. Her best result was the 10th place at the 1984 Summer Olympics in Los Angeles, California. Toivonen set her personal best in the classic distance in 1991, clocking 2:28:59.

== Achievements ==
Year	Competition	Venue	Position	Event	Notes
Representing Finland
1982	European Championships	Athens, Greece	14th	Marathon	2:48:51
1983	World Championships	Helsinki, Finland	8th	Marathon	2:34:14
1984	Olympic Games	Los Angeles, United States	10th	Marathon	2:32:07
1987	World Championships	Rome, Italy	20th	10,000 m	33:25.46
1988	Olympic Games	Seoul, South Korea	41st	Marathon	2:43:00
