= Athletics at the 1984 Summer Olympics – Women's marathon =

Women's marathon at the Games of the XXIII Olympiad
- Venue: Los Angeles Memorial Coliseum, Los Angeles
- Dates: August 5
- Competitors: 50 from 28 nations
- Winning time: 2:24:52

Medalists
1st place, gold medalist(s)		Joan Benoit; United States
2nd place, silver medalist(s)		Grete Waitz; Norway
3rd place, bronze medalist(s)		Rosa Mota; Portugal

Official Video on YouTube Anderson-Schiess Video on YouTube

The Women's Marathon at the 1984 Summer Olympics in Los Angeles, California (United States) was held on August 5, 1984. It was the first time a women's marathon had been held at the Olympic Games. The 50 competitors came from 28 countries. 44 finished the race. The world record holder Joan Benoit of the United States won the gold medal by 1m 26, with the silver medal going to the 1983 World champion Grete Waitz of Norway, and bronze to Rosa Mota of Portugal.

Strategically, the race was notable for Benoit making a bold move in only the third mile of the race, despite the August heat. The rest of the field did not try to keep pace with her, and Benoit maintained her lead all the way to finish, defeating Waitz by more than a minute.

Official Video Highlights of Gabriela Andersen-Schiess

The race was also notable for Gabriela Andersen-Schiess from Switzerland, who entered the stadium for the final lap in a state of almost total exhaustion, barely able to walk but eventually completing the race, collapsing at the finishing line and being immediately treated by medical personnel. She finished 37th.

== Abbreviations ==
- All times shown are in hours:minutes:seconds

DNS	did not start
NM	no mark
OR	olympic record
WR	world record
AR	area record
NR	national record
PB	personal best
SB	season best

== Records ==
Standing records prior to the 1984 Summer Olympics
World Record	Joan Benoit (USA)	2:22:43	April 18, 1983	Boston, United States
Olympic Record	New Event			
Season Best	Ingrid Kristiansen (NOR)	2:24:26	May 13, 1984	London, United Kingdom
Broken records during the 1984 Summer Olympics
Olympic Record	Joan Benoit (USA)	2:24:52	August 5, 1984	Los Angeles, United States

== Final ranking ==
Place	Athlete	Time
	Joan Benoit (USA)	2:24:52
	Grete Waitz (NOR)	2:26:18
	Rosa Mota (POR)	2:26:57
4	Ingrid Kristiansen (NOR)	2:27:34
5	Lorraine Moller (NZL)	2:28:34
6	Priscilla Welch (GBR)	2:28:54
7	Lisa Martin (AUS)	2:29:03
8	Silvia Ruegger (CAN)	2:29:09
9	Laura Fogli (ITA)	2:29:28
10	Tuija Toivonen (FIN)	2:32:07
11	Joyce Smith (GBR)	2:32:48
12	Alba Milana (ITA)	2:33:01
13	Dorthe Rasmussen (DEN)	2:33:40
14	Sarah Rowell (GBR)	2:34:08
15	Sinikka Keskitalo (FIN)	2:35:15
16	Charlotte Teske (FRG)	2:35:56
17	Anne Marie Malone (CAN)	2:36:33
18	Midde Hamrin (SWE)	2:36:41
19	Nanae Sasaki (JPN)	2:37:04
20	Paola Moro (ITA)	2:37:06
21	Ria Van Landeghem (BEL)	2:37:11
22	Carla Beurskens (NED)	2:37:51
23	Regina Joyce (IRL)	2:37:57
24	Marie-Christine Deurbroeck (BEL)	2:38:01
25	Maria Trujillo (MEX)	2:38:50
26	Bente Moe (NOR)	2:40:52
27	Mary O'Connor (NZL)	2:41:22
28	Carey May (IRL)	2:41:27
29	Francine Peeters (BEL)	2:42:22
30	Zehava Shmueli (ISR)	2:42:27
31	Winnie Ng (HKG)	2:42:38
32	Monica Regonesi (CHI)	2:44:44
33	Naydi Nazario (PUR)	2:45:49
34	Yuko Gordon (HKG)	2:46:12
35	Ena Guevara (PER)	2:46:50
36	Julie Brown (USA)	2:47:33
37	Gabriela Andersen-Schiess (SUI)	2:48:42
38	Rita Borralho (POR)	2:50:58
39	Conceição Ferreira (POR)	2:50:58
40	Maria Cardenas (MEX)	2:51:03
41	María Luisa Ronquillo (MEX)	2:51:04
42	Nelly Chávez (BOL)	2:51:35
43	Mary Wagaki (KEN)	2:52:00
44	Eleonora de Mendonça (BRA)	2:52:19
—	Ifeoma Mbanugo (NGR)	DNF
—	Akemi Masuda (JPN)	DNF
—	Jacqueline Gareau (CAN)	DNF
—	Julie Isphording (USA)	DNF
—	Anne Audain (NZL)	DNF
—	Leda Díaz (HON)	DNF

== See also ==
- 1982 Women's European Championships Marathon (Athens)
- 1983 Women's World Championships Marathon (Helsinki)
- 1984 Marathon Year Ranking
- 1986 Women's European Championships Marathon (Stuttgart)
- 1987 Women's World Championships Marathon (Rome)
