= Glenys Quick =

New Zealand long-distance runner

Glenys Quick (born 29 November 1957) is a New Zealand retired female long-distance runner, who won the 1984 edition of Nagoya Marathon, clocking a total time of 2:34:25.

Quick competed in the AIAW for the Texas Woman's Pioneers track and field team, finishing 5th in the 10,000 m at the 1981 AIAW Outdoor Track and Field Championships.

== Achievements ==
Year	Competition	Venue	Position	Event	Notes
Representing New Zealand
1981	Dallas White Rock Marathon	Dallas, United States	2nd	Marathon	2:35:24
1982	Chicago Marathon	Chicago, United States	3rd	Marathon	2:36:50
1983	World Championships	Helsinki, Finland	14th	Marathon	2:37:14
1984	Nagoya Marathon	Nagoya, Japan	1st	Marathon	2:34:25
