= Carol Gould (athlete) =

English long-distance runner

Carol Gould née Firth
Personal information
- Nationality: British (English)
- Born: 10 July 1944 (age 81) Keighley, West Yorkshire, England

Sport
- Sport: Athletics
- Event: long-distance/cross country
- Club: Ipswich Harriers

Carol Tess Gould (née Firth; born 10 July 1944) is a retired female long-distance runner from England, who competed in the 1970s and early 1980s in the women's marathon and cross country events.

== Biography ==
Firth became the national 3000 metres champion after winning the British WAAA Championships title at the 1968 WAAA Championships. She also finished third behind Rita Lincoln in the 1500 metres at the same meeting.

Firth married Terence Gould in Ipswich during the latter part of 1968 and competed under her married name thereafter.

Gould won the South of England Championships 3,000 metres title three times from 1973 to 1978. Gould remained a force on the track, winning the 3000 metres title again at the 1977 WAAA Championships.

Gould set her personal best in the marathon of 2:35.04 at the 1980 New York City Marathon and at the 1982 European Athletics Championships Gould finished 21st in the women's marathon event.

== Achievements ==
Year	Competition	Venue	Position	Event	Notes
Representing United Kingdom and England
1982	European Championships	Athens, Greece	21st	Marathon	2:58:48
