= Karolina Szabó =

Hungarian long-distance runner

Karolina Szabó (born November 17, 1961) is a retired Hungarian athlete, who specialized in the long-distance running events. Born in Dunaföldvár, Tolna, she represented Hungary in the marathon at the 1988 Seoul Olympics, finishing 13th, and the 1992 Barcelona Olympics, finishing 11th.

Szabo won the City-Pier-City Loop half marathon in the Hague in 1987. On 23 April 1988 in Budapest, she broke the 25,000 metres world record on the track with 1:29:29.2, en route to also breaking the 30,000 metres world record with 1:47:05.6. She also won the 1991 Munich Marathon and the 1994 San Francisco Marathon.

== Personal best ==
- Marathon — 2:30:31 (1986)

== Achievements ==
Year	Competition	Venue	Position	Event	Notes
Representing Hungary
1982	European Championships	Athens, Greece	6th	Marathon	2:40:50
1983	World Championships	Helsinki, Finland	18th	Marathon	2:40:23
1984	Friendship Games	Prague, Czechoslovakia	6th	Marathon	2:41:51
1985	Osaka International Ladies Marathon	Osaka, Japan	4th	Marathon	2:36:45
1985	World Marathon Cup	Hiroshima, Japan	3rd	Marathon	2:34:57
1985	New York City Marathon	New York City, United States	28th	Marathon	2:52:06
1986	European Championships	Stuttgart, West Germany	8th	10,000 m	31:55.93 NR.
1986	New York City Marathon	New York City, United States	5th	Marathon	2:34:51
1987	City-Pier-City Loop	The Hague, Netherlands	1st	Half Marathon	1:10:58
1987	World Championships	Rome, Italy	9th	Marathon	2:36:18
1987	New York City Marathon	New York City, United States	5th	Marathon	2:34:58
1988	Olympic Games	Seoul, South Korea	13th	Marathon	2:32:26
1988	New York City Marathon	New York City, United States	4th	Marathon	2:36:40
1991	Munich Marathon	Munich, Germany	1st	Marathon	2:33:09 CR.
1992	Olympic Games	Barcelona, Spain	11th	Marathon	2:40:10
1994	San Francisco Marathon	San Francisco, United States	1st	Marathon	2:44:34
