= Yelena Tsukhlo =

Belarusian marathon runner

Yelena Tsukhlo (Belarusian: Алена Цухло, also transliterated as Alena Zuchlo; born 13 May 1954) is a Belarusian female former long-distance runner who competes in marathons.

Her first international success came at the World University Cross Country Championships, which she won in 1982. She later competed for Belarus at the 1994 IAAF World Cross Country Championships.

It was in the marathon she made her impact, however. In 1987 she set a personal best of 2:28:53 hours in Mogilev for second at the Soviet Championships, ranking her eighth on time for the season, then finished fifth at the 1987 World Championships in Athletics. She also competed at the 1982 European Athletics Championships, 1986 Goodwill Games, European Marathon Cup, IAAF World Marathon Cup (twice), and Friendship Games. She won numerous races on the professional circuit, foremost the 1985 Vienna City Marathon and three straight wins at the Warsaw Marathon from 1994 to 1996. Highly present on the Polish running scene, she is a six-time victor at both the Puck Marathon and Torun Marathon.

== International competitions ==
Year	Competition	Venue	Position	Event	Notes
1982	World University Cross Country Championships	Darmstadt, West Germany	1st	Senior race	15:14
1982	European Championships	Athens, Greece	—	Marathon	DNF
1984	Friendship Games	Moscow, Soviet Union	(guest)	Marathon	2:38:20
1986	Goodwill Games	Moscow, Soviet Union	11th	Marathon	2:39:58
1987	World Championships	Rome, Italy	5th	Marathon	2:33:55
1988	European Marathon Cup	Huy, Belgium	5th	Marathon	2:32:48
1989	World Marathon Cup	Milan, Italy	36th	Marathon	2:47:43
1994	World Cross Country Championships	Budapest, Hungary	127th	Senior race	23:09
1994	World Cross Country Championships	Budapest, Hungary	23rd	Team race	453 pts
1995	World Marathon Cup	Athens, Greece	39th	Marathon	2:49:18

== Marathon wins ==
- Gdansk Marathon: 1996, 1997
- Lebork Marathon: 1997, 2001
- Malorita Marathon: 2003
- Puck Marathon: 1998, 1999, 2000, 2002, 2004, 2005
- Szczytno Marathon: 1998, 2004, 2005
- Torun Marathon: 1998, 2000, 2001, 2003, 2004, 2005
- Tsukuba Marathon: 1993
- Usedom Marathon: 1999, 2000, 2002, 2004
- Uzhhorod Marathon: 1981, 1987
- Vienna City Marathon: 1985
- Warsaw Marathon: 1994, 1995, 1996
