= Carey May =

Irish long-distance runner (born 1959)

Carey May (born 19 July 1959 in Dublin) is a former long-distance runner from Ireland.

She won the Osaka Ladies Marathon in 1983 and 1985 and was the inaugural winner of the Dublin Marathon in 1980.

May competed for the BYU Cougars track and field team in the AIAW.

== Achievements ==
| Year | Competition | Venue | Position | Event | Notes |
Representing Ireland
| 1982 | European Championships | Athens, Greece | 18th | Marathon | 2:52:06 |
| 1983 | Osaka Ladies Marathon | Osaka, Japan | 1st | Marathon | 2:29:23 |
| 1983 | World Championships | Helsinki, Finland | 13th | Marathon | 2:36:28 |
| 1984 | Olympic Games | Los Angeles, United States | 28th | Marathon | 2:41:27 |
| 1984 | New York City Marathon | New York City, United States | 6th | Marathon | 2:38:11 |
| 1985 | Osaka Ladies Marathon | Osaka, Japan | 1st | Marathon | 2:28:07 |
