= Rita Marchisio =

Italian long-distance runner

Personal information
- Nationality: italian
- Born: 13 February 1950 (age 76) Cuneo, Italy
- Height: 1.70 m (5 ft 7 in)
- Weight: 53 kg (117 lb)

Sport
- Country: Italy
- Sport: Athletics
- Event: Marathon

Achievements and titles
- Personal best: Marathon: 2:29.36 (1987)
Medal record
Silver medal – second place	1982 Rome	Team

Rita Marchisio (born 13 February 1950 in Cuneo) is a former long-distance runner from Italy

== Biography ==
She won the inaugural Osaka Ladies Marathon on 24 January 1982 in an Italian record time of 2:32:55 hours. More than a year later the record was broken by Laura Fogli in the New York City Marathon: 2:31:49.

== Achievements ==
Year	Competition	Venue	Position	Event	Notes
1982	Osaka Ladies Marathon	Osaka, Japan	1st	Marathon	2:32:55
1982	European Championships	Athens, Greece	10th	Marathon	2:44:24
1983	World Championships	Helsinki, Finland	11th	Marathon	2:35:08
1984	New York City Marathon	New York City, United States	9th	Marathon	2:41:18
1985	New York City Marathon	New York City, United States	19th	Marathon	2:44:41
1986	European Championships	Stuttgart, West Germany	13th	Marathon	2:42:06
1986	New York City Marathon	New York City, United States	8th	Marathon	2:37:59
1987	World Championships	Rome, Italy	—	Marathon	DNF
1987	Venice Marathon	Venice, Italy	1st	Marathon	2:29:36
1988	Italian Marathon	Carpi, Italy	1st	Marathon	2:31:08
