= Magda Ilands =

Belgian long-distance runner

Magda Ilands (born 16 January 1950) is a Belgian former long-distance runner. She represented Belgium at the 1988 Summer Olympics. She also won the 1985 edition of the Berlin Marathon.

== Achievements ==
Year	Competition	Venue	Position	Event	Notes
Representing Belgium
1982	European Championships	Athens, Greece	—	Marathon	DNF
1983	World Championships	Helsinki, Finland	20th	Marathon	2:40:52
1985	Berlin Marathon	Berlin, West Germany	1st	Marathon	2:34:10
1986	Hamburg Marathon	Hamburg, West Germany	1st	Marathon	2:35:17
1986	European Championships	Stuttgart, West Germany	22nd	10,000 m	33:10.62
1987	Egmond Half Marathon	Egmond, Netherlands	1st	Half Marathon	1:19:30
1988	Olympic Games	Seoul, South Korea	35th	Marathon	2:38:02
