= Regina Joyce =

Irish long-distance runner

Personal information
- Nationality: Irish/American
- Born: 7 February 1957 (age 68) Surrey, England
- Height: 163 cm (5 ft 4 in)
- Weight: 48 kg (106 lb)

Sport
- Sport: Athletics
- Event: middle-distance
- Club: Crawley AC; Westport Athletics Club

Regina Joyce (born 7 February 1957) is an English born, Irish/American retired female long-distance runner, who competed at the 1984 Summer Olympics.

== Biography ==
Regina Joyce and her younger sister Monica Joyce grew up with their parents in Sussex, England. Both sisters originally competed for England as junior athletes but switched to Ireland in 1982, based on the citizenship of their parents, for competitive reasons.

Joyce won the British WAAA Championships title in the 3,000 metres event at the 1980 WAAA Championships.

She set her personal best in the marathon with 2:32.56 in Scottsdale 1982. Also in 1982 she finished second behind her younger sister Monica at the 1982 WAAA Championships.

At the 1984 Olympic Games in Los Angeles, Joyce finished 23rd in the marathon. Her sister Monica also competed in the 1984 Olympics in the 3000 metres. Joyce competed as an NCAA athlete in the U.S. for the University of Washington, where she set school records in every event from 1500m to 10 km.

Joyce became an American citizen in 1993, and continues to run in the Masters division.

== Achievements ==
| Year | Competition | Venue | Position | Event | Notes |
Representing Ireland
| 1983 | World Championships | Helsinki, Finland | 7th | Marathon | 2:33:52 |
| 1984 | World Cross Country Championships | New York City, United States | 21st | 5 km | 16:35 |
| 1984 | Olympic Games | Los Angeles, United States | 23rd | Marathon | 2:37:57 |
