= Lisa Martin (runner) =

Australian long-distance runner

Personal information
- Nationality: Australian
- Born: Lisa Frances O'Dea; 12 May 1960 (age 66) Gawler, South Australia, Australia

Sport
- Country: Australia
- Sport: Athletics
- Event: Marathon
Medal record
Women's athletics
Representing Australia
Olympic Games
Silver medal – second place	1988 Seoul	Marathon
Commonwealth Games
Gold medal – first place	1986 Edinburgh	Marathon
Gold medal – first place	1990 Auckland	Marathon

Lisa Frances Ondieki (née O'Dea, formerly Martin; born 12 May 1960) is an Australian former long-distance runner. In the marathon, she won the 1988 Olympic silver medal and two Commonwealth Games gold medals. Other marathon victories included the 1988 Osaka International Ladies Marathon and the 1992 New York City Marathon. She also won the Great North Run Half Marathon three times. Her best time for the marathon of 2:23:51, set in 1988, made her the fourth-fastest female marathon runner in history at the time.

== Career ==
Lisa O'Dea was born in Gawler, South Australia. She attended Gawler High School. She was originally a 400 m hurdler, and she competed in middle-distance events in the AIAW for the Oregon Ducks track and field team. Initially reluctant to take up the marathon, she won her first marathon competition, the Rocket City marathon in Huntsville, Alabama in 1983, taking almost five minutes off the Australian record with her time of 2:32:22. In 1984, as Lisa Martin, she finished seventh in the inaugural women's Olympic marathon at the 1984 Los Angeles Olympics. Her time of 2:29:03 was the first of her eleven sub 2:30 marathons. Three months later, she finished second in the Chicago Marathon, with a new personal best time of 2:27:40.

At the 1985 Pittsburgh Marathon, she competed alongside her husband at the time, American distance runner Ken Martin; they became the fastest married couple ever in a marathon winning the men's and women's races in 2:12:57 and 2:31:54 respectively. Later that year, she finished second behind Grete Waitz in the New York City Marathon. She won the gold medal in the marathon at the 1986 Commonwealth Games in Edinburgh in a personal best of 2:26:07, with New Zealand's Lorraine Moller in second. A month later, she won the first of her three Great North Run Half Marathon titles in a personal best of 69:45. She ended the 1986 season by again finishing second to Waitz in the New York Marathon. She finished second in the 1987 Osaka marathon, behind Moller, then failed to finish the 1987 World Championship marathon in Rome.

In 1988, she ran her fastest ever marathon, when winning in Osaka with a time of 2:23:51, which at the time made her the fourth-fastest woman marathon runner in history, behind Ingrid Kristiansen, Joan Benoit and Rosa Mota. Later that year, she won a silver medal at the 1988 Seoul Olympics in 2:25:53, 13 seconds behind Mota. In January 1990, she retained her Commonwealth marathon title at the Auckland Games. In a solo performance, she finished over seven minutes ahead of silver medallist Australian team-mate Tani Ruckle. Her time of 2:25:28 remains a Games record (as of 2014). Divorced from Martin, she married Kenyan distance runner Yobes Ondieki in 1990 and missed the rest of that season due to pregnancy, giving birth to their daughter in November 1990. In 1991, she achieved her third top three finish at the New York Marathon, finishing third in a race won by Scotland's Liz McColgan.

In January 1992, she finished second in the Tokyo Half Marathon, running a lifetime best of 68:33, in a race won by McColgan in 67:11. In June, she ran her lifetime best 10,000 metres, running 31:11.72 in Helsinki. This time was the second fastest in the world in 1992, with only Olympic champion Derartu Tulu going faster (31:06). At the 1992 Barcelona Olympics, she failed to finish the marathon, having been one of the gold medal favourites. Three months later, she recovered to win the New York City Marathon, setting a course record of 2:24:40 that would last for nine years. In 1993, she competed in the London Marathon for the first time. In a heavily hyped head-to head with Liz McColgan, they both lost out to Germany's Katrin Dorre, with Ondieki second and McColgan third. In 1994, she again finished second to Dorre in London.

In 1996, now divorced from Ondieki, she ran her fastest marathon time for three years with 2:30:57 in Osaka, to earn selection for her fourth and final Olympics. At the 1996 Atlanta Games, she failed to finish.

== Recognition ==
Martin was inducted into the Sport Australia Hall of Fame in 1997. In 2000, she received an Australian Sports Medal. In 2014, she was inducted into the Athletics Australia Hall of Fame.

== International competitions ==
- All results regarding marathon, unless stated otherwise

Year	Competition	Venue	Position	Notes
Representing Australia
1984	Olympic Games	Los Angeles, United States	7th	2:29:03
1986	Commonwealth Games	Edinburgh, Scotland	1st	2:26:07
1987	World Championships	Rome, Italy	—	DNF
1988	Olympic Games	Seoul, South Korea	2nd	2:25:53
1990	Commonwealth Games	Auckland, New Zealand	1st	2:25:28
1992	Olympic Games	Barcelona, Spain	—	DNF
1996	Olympic Games	Atlanta, United States	—	DNF

== Road races ==
Year	Competition	Venue	Position	Notes
1983	Rocket City Marathon	Huntsville, United States	1st	2:32:22
1984	Canberra Marathon	Canberra, Australia	1st	2:35:05
1984	Chicago Marathon	Chicago, United States	2nd	2:27:40
1985	Pittsburgh Marathon	Pittsburgh, United States	1st	2:31:54
1985	New York City Marathon	New York City, United States	2nd	2:29:48
1986	Great North Run Half Marathon	Newcastle upon Tyne, England	1st	1:09:45
1986	Inverness 10k	Inverness, United Kingdom	1st	31.56
1986	New York City Marathon	New York City, United States	2nd	2:29:12
1987	Osaka International Ladies Marathon	Osaka, Japan	2nd	2:30:59
1987	Great North Run Half Marathon	Newcastle upon Tyne, England	1st	1:10:00
1988	Osaka International Ladies Marathon	Osaka, Japan	1st	2:23:51
1989	Great North Run Half Marathon	Newcastle upon Tyne, England	1st	1:11:03
1991	New York City Marathon	New York, United States	3rd	2:29:01
1992	Tokyo Half Marathon	Tokyo, Japan	2nd	1:08:33
1992	New York City Marathon	New York, United States	1st	2:24:40
1993	London Marathon	London, England	2nd	2:27:27
1994	London Marathon	London, England	2nd	2:33:17
1994	Tokyo International Women's Marathon	Tokyo, Japan	3rd	2:31:01
1995	Tokyo International Women's Marathon	Tokyo, Japan	—	DNF
1996	Osaka International Ladies Marathon	Osaka, Japan	9th	2:30:27
