= Nadezhda Gumerova =

Soviet long-distance runner

Nadezhda Gumerova (Russian: Надежда Гумерова; born January 1, 1949) is a retired female long-distance runner from Kazakhstan, who represented the Soviet Union during her career. She is best known for winning the gold medal in the women's marathon race at the 1986 Goodwill Games. She placed eighth at the New York City Marathon in 1982 with a time of 2:35:37.

== International competitions ==
Year	Competition	Venue	Position	Event	Notes
Representing Soviet Union
1982	European Championships	Athens, Greece	20th	Marathon	2:53:00
1986	European Championships	Stuttgart, West Germany	—	Marathon	DNF
1986	Goodwill Games	Moscow, Soviet Union	1st	Marathon	2:33:55
