= Charlotte Teske =

German long-distance runner (born 1949)

Charlotte Teske (née Bernhardt; born 23 November 1949 in Sachsenhausen, a neighborhood in Waldeck, Hesse) is a former female long-distance runner from Germany, who represented West Germany at the 1984 Summer Olympics. She won the 1982 edition of the Boston Marathon, and the 1986 edition of the Berlin Marathon.

== Achievements ==
Year	Competition	Venue	Position	Event	Notes
Representing West Germany
1982	Boston Marathon	Boston, United States	1st	Marathon	2:29:33
1982	Miami Marathon	Miami, United States	1st	Marathon	2:29:01.6
1982	European Championships	Athens, Greece	12th	Marathon	2:45:17
1983	World Championships	Helsinki, Finland	—	Marathon	DNF
1983	Frankfurt Marathon	Frankfurt, Germany	1st	Marathon	2:28:32
1984	Olympic Games	Los Angeles, United States	16th	Marathon	2:35:56
1984	Frankfurt Marathon	Frankfurt, Germany	1st	Marathon	2:31:16
1986	Berlin Marathon	Berlin, West Germany	1st	Marathon	2:32:10
1987	Hamburg Marathon	Hamburg, West Germany	1st	Marathon	2:31:49
1988	Hamburg Marathon	Hamburg, West Germany	1st	Marathon	2:30:23
