= Zoya Ivanova =

Athletics competitor

Zoya Ivanova (Зоя Иванова; born March 14, 1952, in Petropavl, Kazakh SSR) is a retired long-distance runner from Kazakhstan, who represented the Soviet Union in the women's marathon at the 1988 Summer Olympics in Seoul, South Korea.

She was the 1982 winner of the Tokyo International Women's Marathon. Ivanova was runner-up 1987 World Championships, taking the marathon silver medal.

== Competitions ==
Year	Competition	Venue	Position	Event	Notes
Representing Soviet Union
1982	Tokyo Marathon	Tokyo, Japan	1st	Marathon	2:34:26
1982	European Championships	Athens, Greece	8th	Marathon	2:42:43
1983	World Championships	Helsinki, Finland	23rd	Marathon	2:43:27
1987	World Championships	Rome, Italy	2nd	Marathon	2:32:28
1988	Olympic Games	Seoul, South Korea	9th	Marathon	2:30:25
1989	Los Angeles Marathon	Los Angeles, United States	1st	Marathon	2:34:42
1990	Boston Marathon	Boston, United States	7th	Marathon	2:31:15
1990	Goodwill Games	Seattle, United States	1st	Marathon	2:34:38
