= Raisa Smekhnova =

Soviet long-distance runner

Personal information
- Born: September 16, 1950 (age 75) Kaltan, Kemerovo, Soviet Union

Sport
- Sport: Marathon running
Medal record
Representing Soviet Union
World Championships
Bronze medal – third place	1983 Helsinki	Marathon

Raisa Katyukova-Smekhnova, nacida Raisa Katyukova, (Belarusian: Раіса Кацюкова-Сьмехава; born September 16, 1950) is a retired long-distance runner from the Soviet Union, who won the bronze medal at the 1983 World Championships in Helsinki, Finland, behind Norway's Grete Waitz and USA's Marianne Dickerson. She won the Soviet title in the women's marathon in 1985.

== Achievements ==
Year	Competition	Venue	Position	Event	Notes
Representing Soviet Union
1983	World Championships	Helsinki, Finland	3rd	Marathon	2:31:13
1988	Olympic Games	Seoul, South Korea	16th	Marathon	2:33:19
