= Rita Borralho =

Portuguese long-distance runner

Personal information
- Nationality: Portuguese
- Born: 21 March 1954 (age 72)

Sport
- Sport: Long-distance running
- Event: Marathon

Rita Borralho (born 21 March 1954) is a Portuguese long-distance runner. She competed in the women's marathon at the 1984 Summer Olympics.
