= Rosa Mota =

Portuguese marathon runner (born 1958)

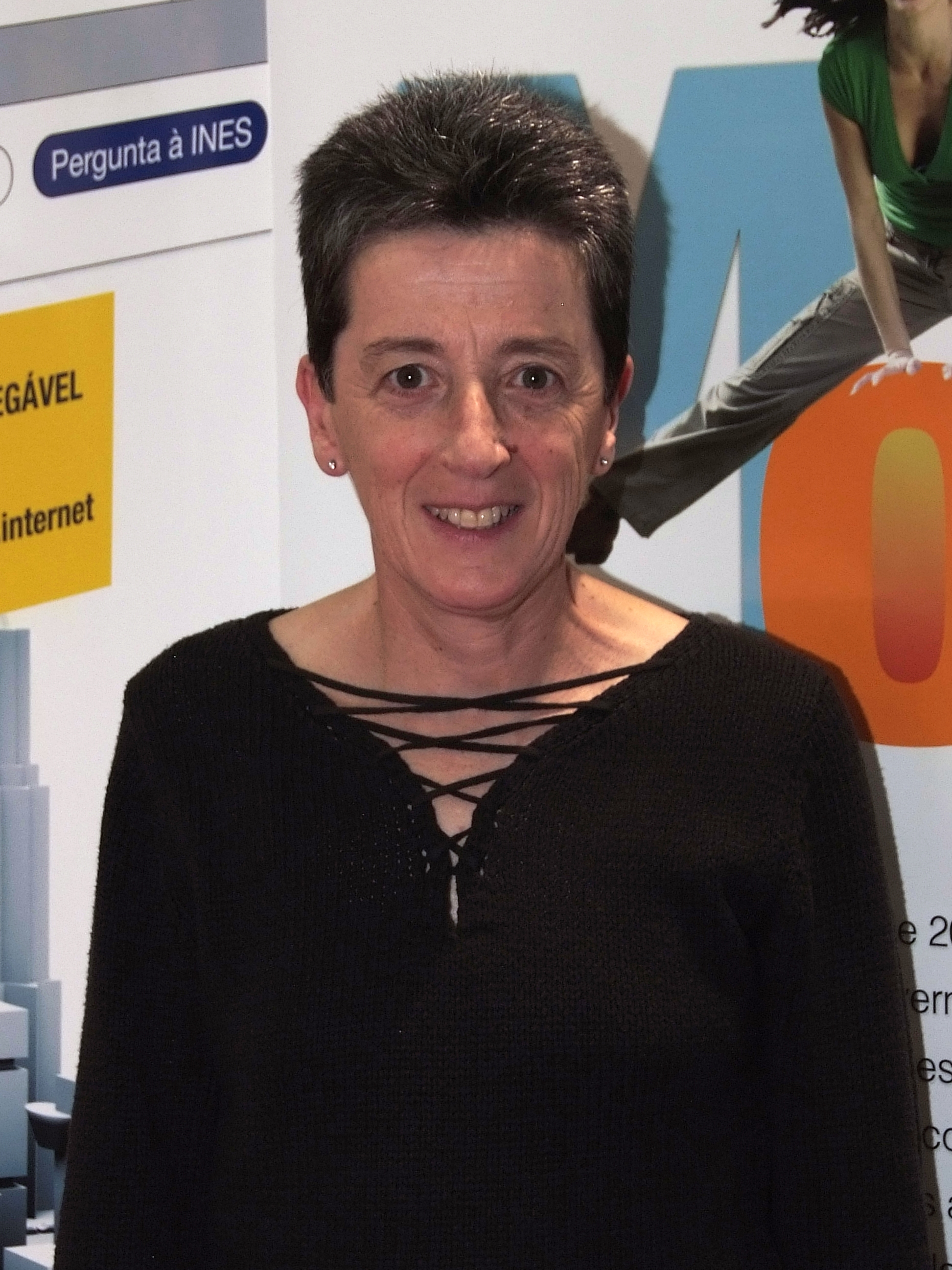
- Rosa Mota in 2012

Personal information
- Full name: Rosa Maria Correia dos Santos Mota
- Born: 29 June 1958 (age 68) Porto, Portugal
- Height: 5 ft 2 in (1.57 m)
- Weight: 99 lb (45 kg)

Sport
- Sport: Track and field athletics
- Event: Marathon
- Retired: 1992

Achievements and titles
- Olympic finals: 1988 – Gold
Medal record
Women's athletics
Representing Portugal
Olympic Games
Gold medal – first place	1988 Seoul	Marathon
Bronze medal – third place	1984 Los Angeles	Marathon
World Championships
Gold medal – first place	1987 Rome	Marathon
European Championships
Gold medal – first place	1982 Athens	Marathon
Gold medal – first place	1986 Stuttgart	Marathon
Gold medal – first place	1990 Split	Marathon

Rosa Maria Correia dos Santos Mota, GCIH, GCM (Portuguese pronunciation: [ˈʁɔzɐ ˈmɔtɐ]; born 29 June 1958) is a Portuguese former marathon runner, one of her country's foremost athletes, being the first sportswoman from Portugal to win Olympic gold. Mota was the first woman to win multiple Olympic marathon medals, as well as being the only woman to be the reigning European, World, and Olympic champion at the same time. On the 30th Anniversary Gala of the Association of International Marathons and Distance Races (AIMS), she was distinguished as the greatest female marathon runner of all time.

== Biography ==
Born in Porto's downtown neighbourhood of Foz Velha, Rosa started participating in cross-country races while in high school.

In 1980, she met José Pedrosa, the man who would eventually be her personal trainer for her entire career. Rosa Mota's first marathon was at the European Championships of 1982, hosted by Athens, Greece - the first Women's Marathon ever. Mota was not one of the favourites for gold, but she easily beat Ingrid Kristiansen to win her first marathon.

This success was typical of Rosa Mota's career, as she usually finished well in the prestigious marathons. She was awarded the bronze medal in the first Women's Olympic Marathon in the Los Angeles Olympic Games. Her personal best time was 2:23:29 in the 1985 Chicago Marathon. Mota won the Chicago Marathon twice.

European Champion in 1986, and World Champion in Rome, 1987, she kept on winning with the Olympic gold medal in Seoul 1988, where with 2 km left in the race, she attacked, winning by 13 seconds from silver medalist Lisa Martin.

In 1990, she returned to Boston to win for a third time, beating Uta Pippig. After that, she attempted to defend her European Marathon Championship in Split. She ran from the front and had a lead of over 1.5 minutes at the halfway mark, but she was caught at the 35 km mark by Valentina Yegorova. They battled to the finish, and Mota won by a slim margin of five seconds. As of 2006, winning a third European Championship marathon was unprecedented for both men and women. She won the 1991 Lisbon Half Marathon

Despite all her success, Rosa Mota was suffering from sciatica and asthma as a child, yet, in 1991, she continued winning, this time the London Marathon. Later that year, Mota had to abandon the Tokyo World championships, and she finally considered retirement after failing to finish the 1992 London Marathon.

Mota ran 21 marathon races between 1982 and 1992. She averaged two marathons a year for a decade and won 14 of those races.

== Achievements ==
Year	Competition	Venue	Position	Event	Notes
Representing Portugal
1982	European Championships	Athens, Greece	1st	Marathon	2:36:04
1983	Rotterdam Marathon	Rotterdam, the Netherlands	1st	Marathon	2:32:27
1983	World Championships	Helsinki, Finland	4th	Marathon	2:31:50
1983	Chicago Marathon	Chicago, United States	1st	Marathon	2:31:12
1984	Olympic Games	Los Angeles, United States	3rd	Marathon	2:26:57
1984	Chicago Marathon	Chicago, United States	1st	Marathon	2:26:01
1985	Chicago Marathon	Chicago, United States	3rd	Marathon	2:23:29
1986	Tokyo Marathon	Tokyo, Japan	1st	Marathon	2:27:15
1986	European Championships	Stuttgart, West Germany	1st	Marathon	2:28:38
1987	Boston Marathon	Boston, United States	1st	Marathon	2:25:21
1987	World Championships	Rome, Italy	1st	Marathon	2:25:17
1988	Boston Marathon	Boston, United States	1st	Marathon	2:24:30
1988	Olympic Games	Seoul, South Korea	1st	Marathon	2:25:40
1989	Osaka Marathon	Osaka, Japan	--	Marathon	DNF
1989	Los Angeles Marathon	Los Angeles, United States	2nd	Marathon	2:35:27
1990	Osaka Marathon	Osaka, Japan	1st	Marathon	2:27:47
1990	Boston Marathon	Boston, United States	1st	Marathon	2:25:24
1990	European Championships	Split, Yugoslavia	1st	Marathon	2:31:27
1991	London Marathon	London, United Kingdom	1st	Marathon	2:26:14
1991	World Championships	Tokyo, Japan	--	Marathon	DNF
1991	Lisbon Half Marathon	Lisbon, Portugal	1st	Half marathon	1:09:52
1992	London Marathon	London, United Kingdom	--	Marathon	DNF

== After retirement ==
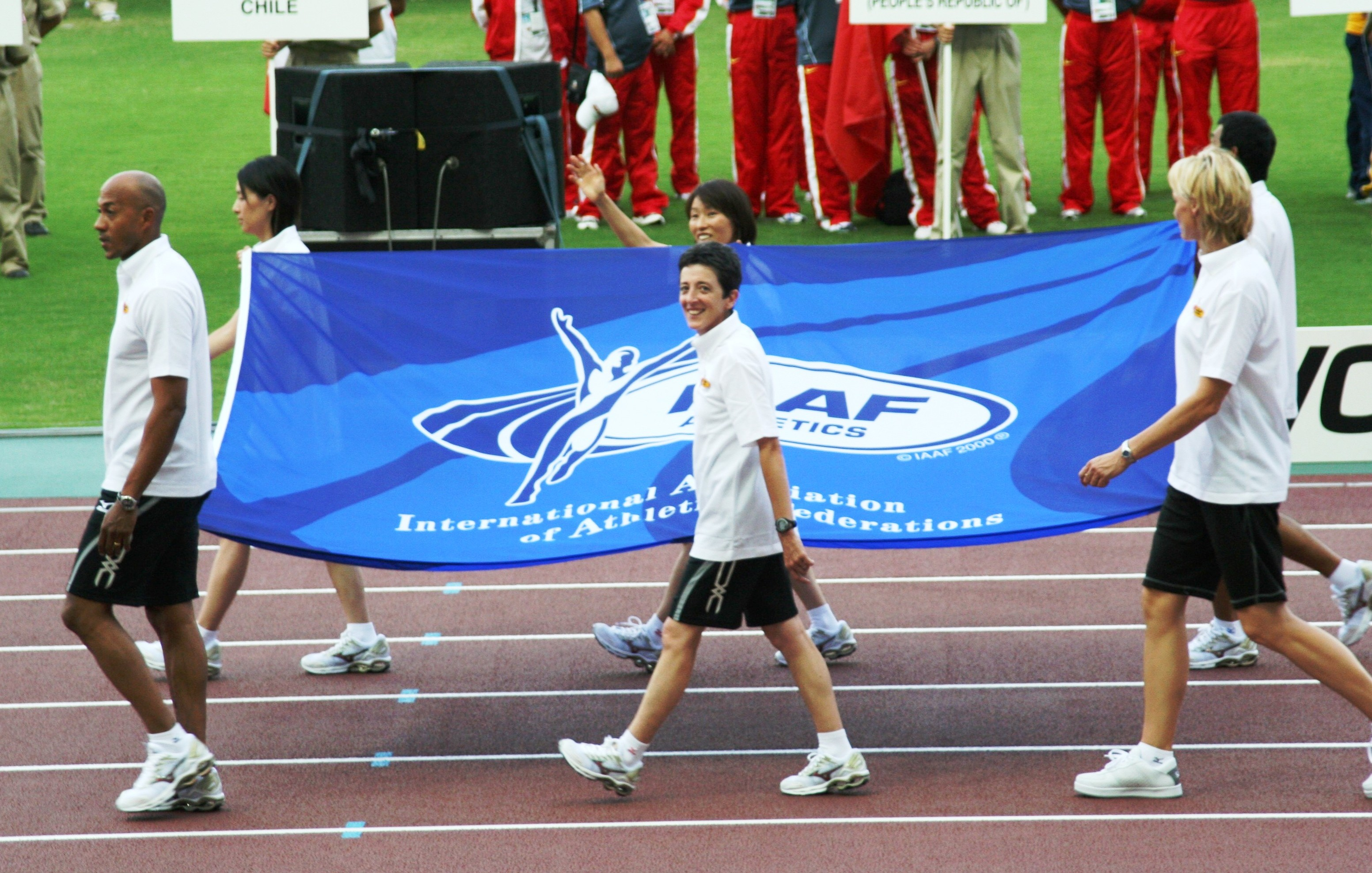
Mota carrying the IAAF flag at the World Athletics Championships 2007 in Osaka

Considered an Ambassador of Sport, in 1998 she won the Abebe Bikila Award for contributions to the development of long-distance race training. The trophy was awarded at the end of the International Race for Friendship, sponsored by the United Nations, taking place in the morning before the 1998 New York City Marathon.

Rosa Mota was one of the most popular personalities of Portuguese sport in the late 20th century, alongside Eusébio, Carlos Lopes and Luís Figo. A Sports Pavilion in Porto was named after her in 1991.

Rosa Mota carried the Olympic flame along the roads of Athens before the 2004 Summer Olympics in Greece.

In recent years Rosa Mota has returned to competitions, winning the Macau mini-marathon (6.3km) 4 times (2018, 2019, 2023 and 2024) and breaking the 10.000m record for women 65-69 year old multiple times with a best time of 35:37 in the Lisbon São Silvestre race.

Awards
Preceded by Alexandre Yokochi; Péricles Pinto	Nobre Guedes Olympic Medal; 1981	Succeeded by Francisco Coelho
