= Laura Fogli =

Italian long-distance runner

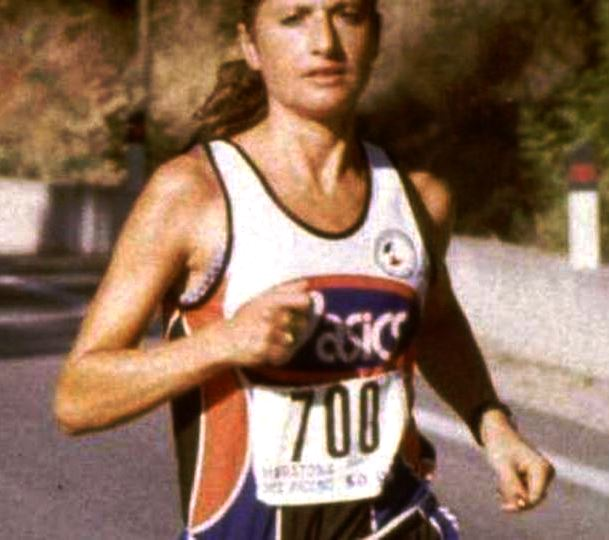
- Fogli in a marathon in Italy in 1980s.

Personal information
- Nationality: Italian
- Born: 5 October 1959 (age 66) Comacchio, Italy
- Height: 1.68 m (5 ft 6 in)
- Weight: 50 kg (110 lb)

Sport
- Country: ITA Italy
- Sport: Athletics
- Event: Marathon
- Club: Snia Milano
- Coached by: Giuseppe Rossetti

Achievements and titles
- Personal bests: Marathon: 2:27.49 (1988); 5000 m: 16:09.19; 10000 m: 33:39.04 (1984)
Medal record
Women's athletics
Representing Italy
Event	1st	2nd	3rd
European Championships	0	2	0
World Marathon Cup	1	1	1
European Cup	0	2	0
European Championships
Silver medal – second place	1982 Athens	Marathon
Silver medal – second place	1986 Stuttgart	Marathon
World Marathon Cup
Gold medal – first place	1985 Hiroshima	Team marathon
Silver medal – second place	1991 London	Team marathon
Bronze medal – third place	1997 Athens	Team marathon
European Marathon Cup
Silver medal – second place	1985 Rome	Team marathon
International Marathons
Event	1st	2nd	3rd
New York City Marathon	0	2	4
Rome City Marathon	1	0	0
Venice Marathon	1	0	0
Pittsburgh Marathon	1	0	0
Turin Marathon	1	0	0

Laura Fogli (born 5 October 1959) is an Italian former long-distance runner who specialized in the marathon race. She finished ninth at the 1984 Los Angeles Olympics and sixth at the 1988 Seoul Olympics. She also won silver medals at the European Championships in 1982 and 1986, and finished second in the New York City Marathon in 1983 and 1988. Her marathon victories include Rome (1982) and Pittsburgh (1986).

== Career ==
Born in Comacchio, Foglio won the inaugural edition of the Rome City Marathon in 1982. From 1981 to 1989 she finished in the top four in eight out of nine New York City Marathons, the exception being 1987 when she did not compete.

She is married with Giuseppe Rossetti, who was also her coach. She is the coach of the Italian singer Gianni Morandi who often takes part in marathons.

== Progression ==
Marathon

Fogil finished eight times in the top 25 world list.

Year	Performance	World Rank	Venue	Date
1981	2.34.48	13	USA New York City	25 October
1982	2.33.01	8	USA New York City	24 October
1983	2.31.49	14	USA New York City	23 October
1984	2.29.28	11	USA Los Angeles	5 August
1985	2.31.36	15	USA New York City	27 October
1986	2.29.44	9	USA New York City	2 November
1988	2.27.49	8	KOR Seoul	23 September
1989	2.28.43	9	USA New York City	5 November

== Achievements ==
- All results regarding marathon, unless stated otherwise

Year	Competition	Venue	Position	Performance	Note
1981	New York City Marathon	USA New York, United States	4th	2:34:47	
1982	Rome City Marathon	ITA Rome, Italy	1st	2:31:08	
1982	European Championships	GRE Athens, Greece	2nd	2:36:28	
1982	New York City Marathon	USA New York, United States	4th	2:33:01	
1983	World Championships	FIN Helsinki, Finland	6th	2:33:31	
1983	New York City Marathon	USA New York, United States	2nd	2:31:49	
1984	Stramilano Half Marathon	ITA Milan, Italy	1st	1:14:10	
1984	Olympic Games	USA Los Angeles, United States	9th	2:29:28	
1984	New York City Marathon	USA New York, United States	3rd	2:37:25	
1985	New York City Marathon	USA New York, United States	3rd	2:31:36	
1986	Pittsburgh Marathon	USA Pittsburgh, United States	1st	2:37:04	
1986	European Championships	FRG Stuttgart, West Germany	2nd	2:32:52	
1986	New York City Marathon	USA New York City, United States	3rd	2:29:44	
1988	Olympic Games	KOR Seoul, South Korea	6th	2:27:49	
1988	New York City Marathon	USA New York, United States	2nd	2:31:26	
1989	New York City Marathon	USA New York, United States	3rd	2:28:43	
1990	Venice Marathon	ITA Venice, Italy	1st	2:38:34	
1991	World Championships	JPN Tokyo, Japan	—	DNF	
1993	New York City Marathon	USA New York, United States	14th	2:47:45	
1994	Turin Marathon	ITA Turin, Italy	1st	2:31:45	
1994	European Championships	FIN Helsinki, Finland	—	DNF	
1997	World Championships	GRE Athens, Greece	24th	2:43:28	

== National titles ==
Laura Fogli has won two times the individual national championship.

- 2 wins in half marathon (1980, 1982)

== See also ==
- Italian all-time lists – Marathon

Awards
Preceded by Manuela Dalla Valle	Italian Sportswoman of the Year; 1988	Succeeded by Angela Bandini
