= List of winners of the Berlin Marathon =

The Berlin Marathon is an annual marathon that has been held in Berlin since 1974. It is known for its flat course that has produced numerous world record times, including by Eliud Kipchoge in 2018 and 2022 and Tigst Assefa in 2023. In addition, wheelchair, handcycle, and inline skating races are also held.

== Elite race ==
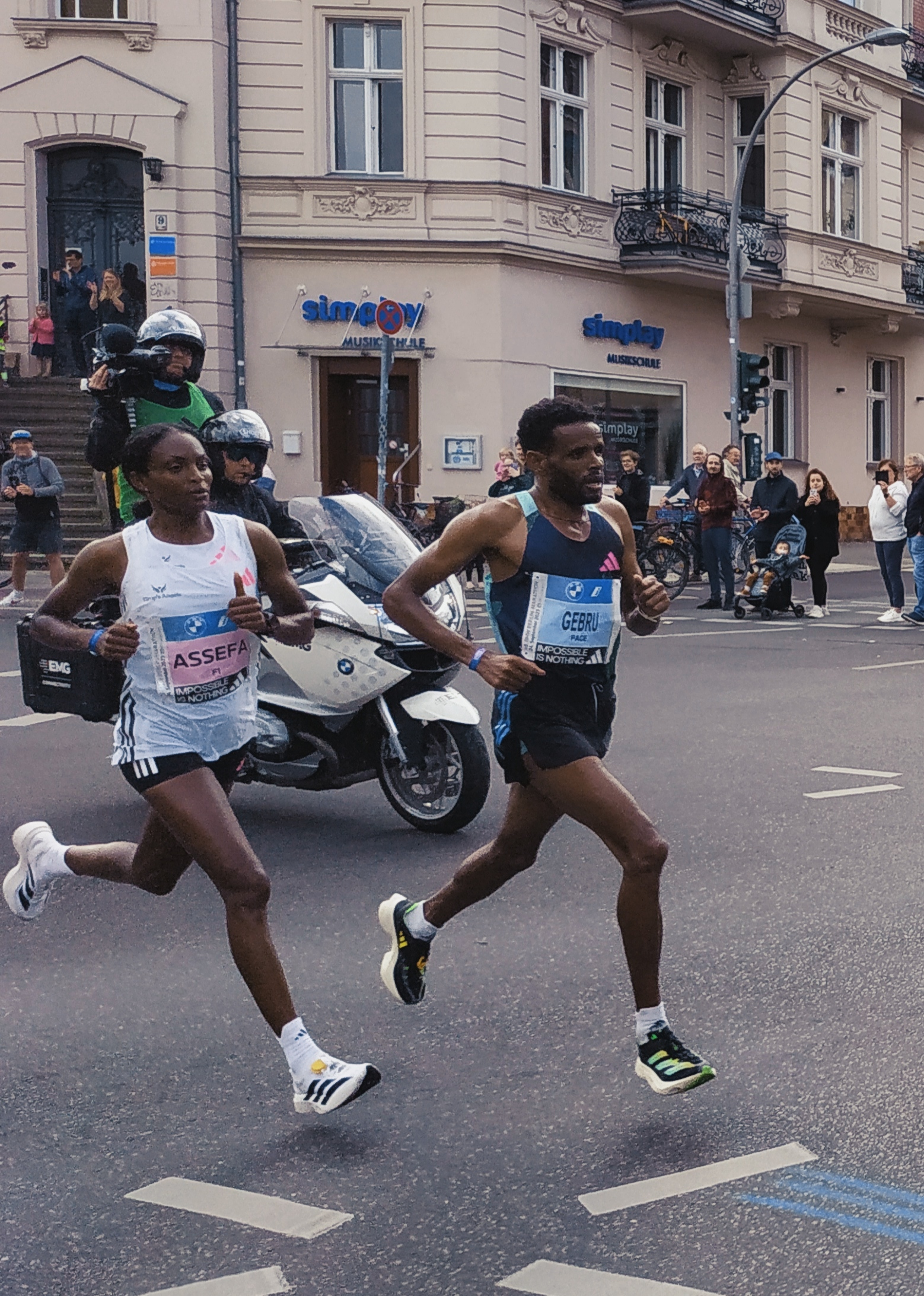
World record winner Tigst Assefa (left) about 25 km (16 mi) into the 2023 Berlin Marathon, alongside pacemaker Girmay Birhanu Gebru

=== Winners ===
Key:

Current course record
German championship race

Ed.	Date	Men's winner	Country	Time	Women's winner	Country	Time
51	21 September 2025	Sabastian Sawe	Kenya	2:02:16	Rosemary Wanjiru	Kenya	2:21:05
50	29 September 2024	Milkesa Mengesha	Ethiopia	2:03:17	Tigist Ketema	Ethiopia	2:16:42
49	24 September 2023	Eliud Kipchoge	Kenya	2:02:42	Tigst Assefa	Ethiopia	2:11:53 WR
48	25 September 2022	Eliud Kipchoge	Kenya	2:01:09 WR	Tigst Assefa	Ethiopia	2:15:37
47	26 September 2021	Guye Adola	Ethiopia	2:05:45	Gotytom Gebreslase	Ethiopia	2:20:09
—	2020	Cancelled due to COVID-19 pandemic					
46	29 September 2019	Kenenisa Bekele	Ethiopia	2:01:41	Ashete Bekere	Ethiopia	2:20:14
45	16 September 2018	Eliud Kipchoge	Kenya	2:01:39 WR	Gladys Cherono	Kenya	2:18:11
44	24 September 2017	Eliud Kipchoge	Kenya	2:03:32	Gladys Cherono	Kenya	2:20:23
43	25 September 2016	Kenenisa Bekele	Ethiopia	2:03:03	Aberu Kebede	Ethiopia	2:20:45
42	27 September 2015	Eliud Kipchoge	Kenya	2:04:00	Gladys Cherono	Kenya	2:19:25
41	28 September 2014	Dennis Kimetto	Kenya	2:02:57 WR	Tirfi Tsegaye	Ethiopia	2:20:18
40	29 September 2013	Wilson Kipsang	Kenya	2:03:23 WR	Florence Kiplagat	Kenya	2:21:13
39	30 September 2012	Geoffrey Mutai	Kenya	2:04:15	Aberu Kebede	Ethiopia	2:20:30
38	25 September 2011	Patrick Musyoki	Kenya	2:03:38 WR	Florence Kiplagat	Kenya	2:19:44
37	26 September 2010	Patrick Musyoki	Kenya	2:05:08	Aberu Kebede	Ethiopia	2:23:58
36	20 September 2009	Haile Gebrselassie	Ethiopia	2:06:08	Atsede Habtamu	Ethiopia	2:24:47
35	28 September 2008	Haile Gebrselassie	Ethiopia	2:03:59 WR	Irina Mikitenko	Germany	2:19:19
34	30 September 2007	Haile Gebrselassie	Ethiopia	2:04:26 WR	Gete Wami	Ethiopia	2:23:17
33	24 September 2006	Haile Gebrselassie	Ethiopia	2:05:56	Gete Wami	Ethiopia	2:21:34
32	25 September 2005	Philip Manyim	Kenya	2:07:41	Mizuki Noguchi	Japan	2:19:12
31	26 September 2004	Felix Limo	Kenya	2:06:44	Yoko Shibui	Japan	2:19:41
30	28 September 2003	Paul Tergat	Kenya	2:04:55 WR	Yasuko Hashimoto	Japan	2:26:32
29	29 September 2002	Raymond Kipkoech	Kenya	2:06:47	Naoko Takahashi	Japan	2:21:49
28	30 September 2001	Joseph Ngolepus	Kenya	2:08:47	Naoko Takahashi	Japan	2:19:46 WR
27	10 September 2000	Simon Biwott	Kenya	2:07:42	Kazumi Matsuo	Japan	2:26:15
26	26 September 1999	Josephat Kiprono	Kenya	2:06:44	Tegla Loroupe	Kenya	2:20:43 WR
25	20 September 1998	Ronaldo da Costa	Brazil	2:06:05 WR	Marleen Renders	Belgium	2:25:22
24	28 September 1997	Elijah Lagat	Kenya	2:07:41	Catherina McKiernan	Ireland	2:23:44
23	29 September 1996	Abel Antón	Spain	2:09:15	Colleen De Reuck	South Africa	2:26:35
22	24 September 1995	Sammy Lelei	Kenya	2:07:02	Uta Pippig	Germany	2:25:37
21	25 September 1994	António Pinto	Portugal	2:08:31	Katrin Dörre-Heinig	Germany	2:25:15
20	26 September 1993	Xolile Yawa	South Africa	2:10:57	Renata Kokowska	Poland	2:26:20
19	27 September 1992	David Tsebe	South Africa	2:08:07	Uta Pippig	Germany	2:30:22
18	29 September 1991	Steve Brace	United Kingdom	2:10:57	Renata Kokowska	Poland	2:27:36
17	30 September 1990	Steve Moneghetti	Australia	2:08:16	Uta Pippig	East Germany	2:28:37
16	1 October 1989	Alfredo Shahanga	Tanzania	2:10:11	Päivi Tikkanen	Finland	2:28:45
15	9 October 1988	Suleiman Nyambui	Tanzania	2:11:45	Renata Kokowska	Poland	2:29:16
14	4 October 1987	Suleiman Nyambui	Tanzania	2:11:11	Kerstin Preßler	West Germany	2:31:22
13	28 September 1986	Bogusław Psujek	Poland	2:11:03	Charlotte Teske	West Germany	2:32:10
12	29 September 1985	Jimmy Ashworth	United Kingdom	2:11:43	Magda Ilands	Belgium	2:34:10
11	30 September 1984	John Skovbjerg	Denmark	2:13:35	Ágnes Sipka	Hungary	2:39:32
10	25 September 1983	Karel Lismont	Belgium	2:13:37	Karen Holdsworth	United Kingdom	2:40:32
9	26 September 1982	Domingo Tibaduiza	Colombia	2:14:47	Jean Lochhead	United Kingdom	2:47:05
8	27 September 1981	Ian Ray	United Kingdom	2:15:42	Angelika Stephan	West Germany	2:47:24
7	28 September 1980	Ingo Sensburg	West Germany	2:16:48	Gerlinde Püttmann	West Germany	2:47:18
6	30 September 1979	Ingo Sensburg	West Germany	2:21:09	Jutta von Haase	West Germany	3:07:07
5	3 September 1978	Michael Spöttel	West Germany	2:20:03	Ursula Blaschke	West Germany	2:57:09
4	10 September 1977	Günter Mielke	West Germany	2:15:19	Christa Vahlensieck	West Germany	2:34:48 WR
3	26 September 1976	Ingo Sensburg	West Germany	2:23:08	Jutta von Haase	West Germany	3:05:19
2	28 September 1975	Ralf Bochröder	West Germany	2:47:08	Kristin Bochröder	West Germany	2:59:15
1	13 October 1974	Günter Hallas	West Germany	2:44:53	Jutta von Haase	West Germany	3:22:01

=== World records ===
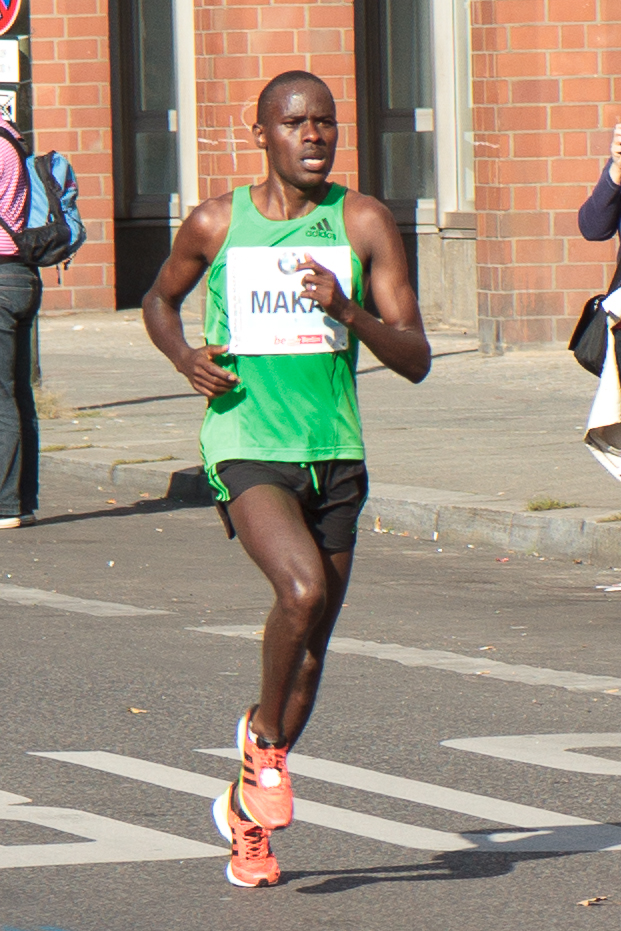
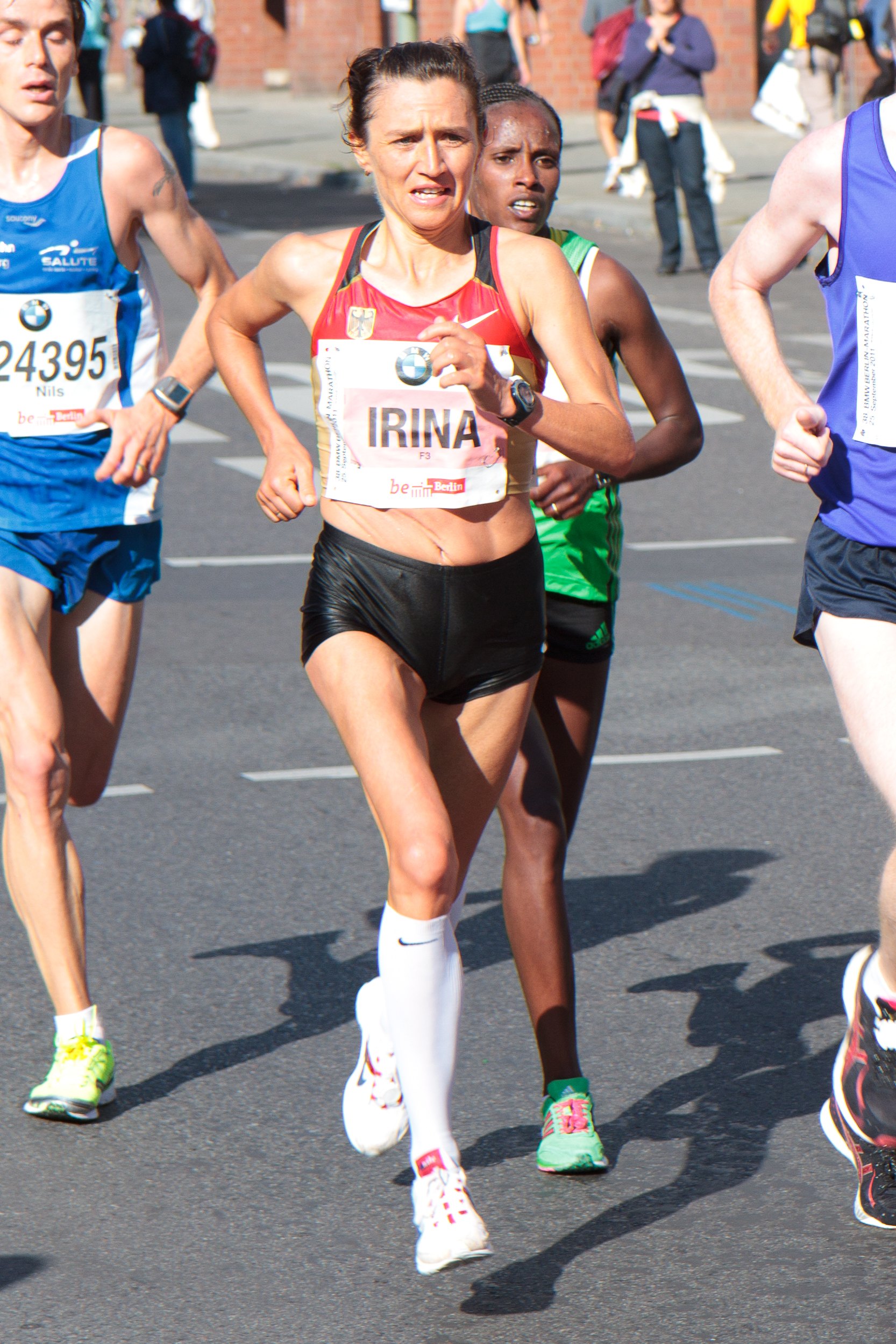
Patrick Makau Musyoki and Irina Mikitenko in 2011

Year	Athlete	Country	Record	Sex
2023	Tigst Assefa	Ethiopia	2:11:53	Women
2022	Eliud Kipchoge	Kenya	2:01:09	Men
2018	Eliud Kipchoge	Kenya	2:01:39	Men
2014	Dennis Kipruto Kimetto	Kenya	2:02:57	Men
2013	Wilson Kipsang Kiprotich	Kenya	2:03:23	Men
2011	Patrick Makau Musyoki	Kenya	2:03:38	Men
2008	Haile Gebrselassie	Ethiopia	2:03:59	Men
2007	Haile Gebrselassie	Ethiopia	2:04:26	Men
2003	Paul Tergat	Kenya	2:04:55	Men
2001	Naoko Takahashi	Japan	2:19:46	Women
1999	Tegla Loroupe	Kenya	2:20:43	Women
1998	Ronaldo da Costa	Brazil	2:06:05	Men
1977	Christa Vahlensieck	West Germany	2:34:48	Women

== Inline skating race ==
Key: Course record (in bold)

Year	Men's winner	Country	Time	Women's winner	Country	Time
2025	Ewen Fernandez	France	59:27	Aubane Plouhinec	France	1:16:06
2024	Bart Swings	Belgium	1:00:02	Noraly Berber Vonk	Netherlands	1:13:53
2023	Jason Suttels	Belgium	57:01	Gabriela Rueda	Colombia	1:08:59
2022	Bart Swings	Belgium	56:45	Marie Dupuy	France	1:11:19
2021	Bart Swings	Belgium	56:50	Sandrine Tas	Belgium	1:13:40
2020	cancelled due to coronavirus pandemic					
2019	Felix Rijhnen	Germany	1:10:30	Sandrine Tas	Belgium	1:25:49
2018	Bart Swings	Belgium	57:58	Katharina Rumpus	Germany	1:09:15
2017	Bart Swings	Belgium	58:42	Maira Yaqueline Arias	Argentina	**1:06:35**
2016	Bart Swings	Belgium	59:59	Manon Kamminga	Netherlands	1:08:38
2015	Bart Swings	Belgium	**56:49**	Sandrine Tas	Belgium	1:09:20
2014	Bart Swings	Belgium	59:59	Manon Kamminga	Netherlands	1:08:38
2013	Bart Swings	Belgium	59:28	Manon Kamminga	Netherlands	1:09:58
2012	Ewen Fernandez	France	1:00:04	Sabine Berg	Germany	1:14:13
2011	Ewen Fernandez	France	1:01:26	Sabine Berg	Germany	1:14:56
2010	Severin Widmer	Switzerland	1:09:19	Giovanna Turchiarelli	Italy	1:22:25
2009	Luca Saggiorato	Italy	1:02:50	Cecilia Baena	Colombia	1:14:47
2008	Joey Mantia	United States	1:00:33	Cecilia Baena	Colombia	1:13:24
2007	Nicolas Iten	Switzerland	1:12:30	Hilde Goovaerts	Belgium	1:23:20
2006	Luca Saggiorato	Italy	1:02:25	Giovanna Turchiarelli	Italy	1:14:02
2005	Luca Saggiorato	Italy	1:01:21	Brigitte Méndez	Colombia	1:10:43
2004	Roger Schneider	Switzerland	1:04:43	Cecilia Baena	Colombia	1:17:08
2003	Juan Carlos Betancur	Colombia	1:02:03	Julie Glass	United States	1:11:28
2002	Juan Carlos Betancur	Colombia	1:04:44	Angèle Vaudan	France	1:13:59
2001	Arnaud Gicquel	France	1:04:17	Sheila Herrero	Spain	1:12:57
2000	Chad Hedrick	United States	1:01:45	Angèle Vaudan	France	1:08:29
1999	Tristan Loy	France	1:01:08	Anne Titze	Germany	1:09:32
1998	Johann Langenberg	France	1:07:32	Caroline Lagree	France	1:14:20
1997	Pascal Briand	France	1:07:52	Caroline Jean	France	1:15:30

== Handcycle race ==
Key: Course record (in bold)

Year	Men's winner	Time	Women's winner	Time
2025	Joseph Fritsch (FRA)	**57:53**	Annika Zeyen-Giles (GER)	1:10:38
2024	Vico Merklein (GER)	1:04:46	Francesca Porcellato (ITA)	1:17:44
2023	Joseph Fritsch (FRA)	1:00:05	Julia Dierkesmann (GER)	1:17:51
2022	Joseph Fritsch (FRA)	1:04:32	Katrin Möller (GER)	1:20:59
2021	Jonas van de Steene (BEL)	1:01:40	Yvonne Pijahn (GER)	1:22:03
2020	cancelled due to coronavirus pandemic			
2019	Jetze Plat (NED)	1:00:01	Jennette Jansen (NED)	1:10:21
2018	Vico Merklein (GER)	1:04:56	Jennette Jansen (NED)	1:17:36
2017	Jetze Plat (NED)	1:03:45	Christiane Reppe (GER)	1:10:07
2016	Jetze Plat (NED)	1:05:06	Christiane Reppe (GER)	**1:08:54**
2015	Vico Merklein (GER)	1:02:32	Christiane Reppe (GER)	1:10:12
2014	Jetze Plat (NED)	1:03:37	Christiane Reppe (GER)	1:10:23
2013	Vico Merklein (GER)	1:06:14	Silke Pan (GER)	1:15:31
2012	Vico Merklein (GER)	1:05:21	Karen Darke (GBR)	1:17:42
2011	Vico Merklein (GER)	1:04:12	Ursula Schwaller (SUI)	1:17:09
2010	Vico Merklein (GER)	1:09:04	Ursula Schwaller (SUI)	1:25:13
2009	Torsten Purschke (GER)	1:05:47	Monique van der Vorst (NED)	1:18:28
2008	Bernd Jeffré (GER)	1:05:46	Dorothee Vieth (GER)	1:13:55
2007	Wim Decleir (BEL)	1:11:12	Andrea Eskau (GER)	1:18:40
2006	Wim Decleir (BEL)	1:11:03	Monique van der Vorst (NED)	1:18:34
2005	Wim Decleir (BEL)	1:13:32	Andrea Eskau (GER)	1:15:50
2004	Errol Marklein (GER)	1:17:02	Monique van der Vorst (NED)	1:24:43

== Wheelchair race ==
Key: Course record (in bold)

Year	Men's winner	Time	Women's winner	Time
2025	Marcel Hug (SUI)	1:21:46	Manuela Schär (SUI)	1:35:08
2024	Marcel Hug (SUI)	1:27:18	Catherine Debrunner (SUI)	1:35:23
2023	Marcel Hug (SUI)	1:23:07	Catherine Debrunner (SUI)	**1:34:16**
2022	Marcel Hug (SUI)	1:24:56	Catherine Debrunner (SUI)	1:36:47
2021	Marcel Hug (SUI)	1:24:03	Manuela Schär (SUI)	1:37:31
2020	cancelled due to coronavirus pandemic			
2019	Marcel Hug (SUI)	1:28:09	Manuela Schär (SUI)	1:38:07
2018	Brent Lakatos (CAN)	1:29:41	Manuela Schär (SUI)	1:36:53
2017	Marcel Hug (SUI)	1:29:03	Manuela Schär (SUI)	1:40:05
2016	Marcel Hug (SUI)	1:29:51	Manuela Schär (SUI)	1:43:00
2015	David Weir (GBR)	1:27:36	Natalia Kocherova (RUS)	1:50:36
2014	Kota Hokinoue (JPN)	1:32:25	Shelly Woods (GBR)	1:47:56
2013	Heinz Frei (SUI)	1:31:00	Manuela Schär (SUI)	1:41:39
2012	Marcel Hug (SUI)	1:29:43	Sandra Graf (SUI)	1:46:19
2011	Marcel Hug (SUI)	1:29:31	Edith Hunkeler (SUI)	1:45:20
2010	Masazumi Soejima (JPN)	1:28:46	Wakako Tsuchida (JPN)	1:46:15
2009	Heinz Frei (SUI)	1:28:38	Sandra Graf (SUI)	1:39:31
2008	Heinz Frei (SUI)	1:27:55	Sandra Hager (SUI)	2:04:21
2007	Masazumi Soejima (JPN)	1:26:50	Simone Buess (SUI)	1:48:50
2006	Heinz Frei (SUI)	1:29:30	Sandra Graf (SUI)	1:42:52
2005	Heinz Frei (SUI)	1:28:32	Edith Hunkeler (SUI)	1:49:46
2004	Thomas Gerlach (DEN)	1:33:49	not held	
2003	Joël Jeannot (FRA)	1:25:19	Yvonne Sehmisch (GER)	1:52:05
2002	Heinz Frei (SUI)	1:28:28	Edith Hunkeler (SUI)	1:45:52
2001	Heinz Frei (SUI)	1:30:24	Edith Hunkeler (SUI)	1:47:46
2000	Heinz Frei (SUI)	1:26:30	Sandra Graf (SUI)	1:52:31
1999	Heinz Frei (SUI)	1:23:57	Monica Wetterström (SWE)	1:48:12
1998	Heinz Frei (SUI)	1:24:19	Edith Hunkeler (SUI)	1:47:53
1997	Heinz Frei (SUI)	**1:21:39**	Louise Sauvage (AUS)	1:49:58
1996	Heinz Frei (SUI)	1:25:34	Monica Wetterström (SWE)	1:54:00
1995	Heinz Frei (SUI)	1:22:49	Lily Anggreny (GER)	1:58:38
1994	Heinz Frei (SUI)	1:22:12	Louise Sauvage (AUS)	1:57:14
1993	Heinz Frei (SUI)	1:27:16	Lily Anggreny (GER)	1:50:34
1992	Heinz Frei (SUI)	1:29:41	Jennette Jansen (NED)	1:42:07
1991	Heinz Frei (SUI)	1:27:39	Beate Meier (GER)	1:51:50
1990	Jean-Marc Berset (SUI)	1:34:41	Daniela Jutzeler (SUI)	1:57:47
1989	Heinz Frei (SUI)	1:40:11	Daniela Jutzeler (SUI)	1:55:23
1988	Markus Pilz (FRG)	1:52:08	Gabriele Schild (SUI)	2:52:29
1987	Gregor Golombek (FRG)	1:46:52	Margit Quell (FRG)	2:21:29
1986	Heinz Frei (SUI)	1:46:44	Connie Hansen (DEN)	2:32:23
1985	Heinz Frei (SUI)	1:57:28	Gabriele Schild (SUI)	2:33:51
1984	Bosse Lindquist (SWE)	2:16:32	Gabriele Beyer (FRG)	2:47:14
1983	Gregor Golombek (FRG)	1:55:10	Gabriele Beyer (FRG)	2:51:12
1982	Bosse Lindquist (SWE)	2:03:10		
1981	Georg Freund (FRG)	2:08:44	not held	
