= Bochröder =

Bochröder is a German surname. Notable people with the surname include:

- Kristin Bochröder (born 1941), German judge and marathon runner
- Ralf Bochröder (born 1940), German marathon runner
