= 2005 Berlin Marathon =

Road running event in Berlin, Germany

32nd Berlin Marathon
- Venue: Berlin, Germany
- Dates: 25 September 2005

Champions
- Men: Philip Manyim (2:07:41)
- Women: Mizuki Noguchi (2:19:12)

The 2005 Berlin Marathon was the 32nd edition of the Berlin Marathon. The marathon took place in Berlin, Germany, on 25 September 2005.

The men's race was won by Philip Manyim in 2:07:41 hours and the women's race was won by Mizuki Noguchi in a time of 2:19:12 hours.

== Results ==
=== Men ===
Position see	Athlete	Nationality	Time
1st place, gold medalist(s)	Philip Manyim	Kenya	2:07:41
2nd place, silver medalist(s)	Peter Kiplagat Chebet	Kenya	2:08:58
3rd place, bronze medalist(s)	Jackson Koech	Kenya	2:09:07
4	Joshua Chelanga	Kenya	2:09:10
5	Joseph Ngolepus	Kenya	2:10:10
6	Mola Shimelis	Ethiopia	2:10:11
7	Michael Kosgei Rotich	Kenya	2:10:53
8	Andrew Letherby	Australia	2:11:42
9	Romulo Wagner	Brazil	2:12:03
10	Terefe Yae	Ethiopia	2:12:07

=== Women ===
Position	Athlete	Nationality	Time
1st place, gold medalist(s)	Mizuki Noguchi	Japan	2:19:12
2nd place, silver medalist(s)	Luminita Zaituc	Germany	2:27:34
3rd place, bronze medalist(s)	Askale Tafa	Ethiopia	2:28:27
4	Melanie Kraus	Germany	2:34:23
5	Worknesh Tola	Ethiopia	2:35:31
6	Shona Crombie-Hicks	United Kingdom	2:38:42
7	Anne-Metta Aagaard	Denmark	2:38:44
8	Anna Rahm	Sweden	2:39:31
9	Eva-Maria Gradwohl	Austria	2:39:51
10	Jessica Draskau-Petersson	Denmark	2:42:00
