= Eric Kimaiyo =

Kenyan marathon runner and coach

Personal information
- Full name: Erick Kimaiyo Kimase
- Born: 8 July 1969 (age 57) Kenya

Sport
- Sport: Athletics
Medal record
Marathon
World Marathon Majors
Representing Kenya
Silver medal – second place	1997 Berlin	Marathon

Erick Kimaiyo Kimase (born 8 July 1969) is a Kenyan former marathon runner who came second at the 1997 Berlin Marathon, and won the Honolulu and Baltimore Marathons on multiple occasions. Kimaiyo now works as a marathon coach, and trains current women's world record holder Brigid Kosgei.

== Personal life ==
Kimaiyo is the cousin of fellow Kenyan former runner Raymond Kipkoech. He has four children.

== Running career ==
In 1996, Kimaiyo finished 18th at the Boston Marathon, in a time of 2:14:37. Later in the year, he won the Honolulu Marathon in a time of 2:13:23. It was the second fastest marathon time that year. Kimaiyo and Jimmy Muindi had broken away around 19 miles (31 km) into the race, and Kimaiyo was awarded $20,000 for winning the race.

Kimaiyo came second at the 1997 Berlin Marathon, losing in a sprint finish to fellow Kenyan Elijah Lagat by two seconds. The Kenyan team at the event won the team world record. Later in the year, Kimaiyo competed at the 1997 New York City Marathon. In the same year, Kimaiyo won the Honolulu Marathon again, in a time of 2:12:17, a course record time. (Note: The Honolulu Marathon course was altered in 1992. Ibrahim Hussein ran 2:11:43 on a previous course.) Kimaiyo broke away from Muindi and Thabiso Moqhali after 25 miles (40 km) of the race, on the ascent of Diamond Head. In 1998, Kimaiyo came eighth at a half marathon event in Ngong, Kenya.

In 1999, Kimaiyo came second at the Honolulu Marathon behind Muindi. Muindi, Kimaiyo and Mbarak Hussein were all involved in the sprint finish. Kimaiyo ran in the 2000 Berlin Marathon, but dropped away from the lead group 10–20 kilometres (6.2–12.4 mi) into the race. In 2002, Kimaiyo came eighth at the Rock 'n' Roll San Diego Marathon. In the same year, he won the Baltimore Marathon in a time of 2:17.44. He won the race by over two minutes. In 2003, he retained his Baltimore Marathon title after beating Christopher Kipkosgei in a sprint finish.

== Coaching career ==
Kimaiyo now works as a marathon coach, and runs a training camp in Kapsait, Kenya at an altitude of 9,600 feet (2,900 m). In 2015, Kimaiyo invited Brigid Kosgei to join his training camp in Kapsait, Kenya. Since 2019, Kosgei is the current women's world record holder. Kimaiyo has also trained Edward Zakayo, who won the 5000 metres event at an under-20 World Championships, Christopher Kipkosgei, who finished second to Kimaiyo at the 2003 Baltimore Marathon after training with him for half a year, and Judith Korir, who won the 2022 Paris Marathon.
