= Gabriele Beyer =

Gabriele Beyer may refer to:

- Gabriele Beyer née Bertrand (1737‍–‍1802), French-Austrian pastel artist in the Viennese court
- Gabriele Beyer (Q106939399) (born 1961), judge and jurist from Hanover
- Gabriele Beyer, German Paralympic gold medalist and former Berlin Marathon champion
