= 1995 Berlin Marathon =

22nd Berlin Marathon
- Venue: Berlin, Germany
- Dates: 24 September 1995

Champions
- Men: Sammy Lelei (2:07:02)
- Women: Uta Pippig (2:25:37)

The 1995 Berlin Marathon was the 22nd running of the annual marathon race held in Berlin, Germany, held on 24 September 1995. Kenya's Sammy Lelei won the men's race in 2:07:02 hours, while the women's race was won by home athlete Uta Pippig in 2:25:37.

== Results ==
=== Men ===
Position	Athlete	Nationality	Time
1	Sammy Lelei	Kenya	2:07:02
2	Vincent Rousseau	Belgium	2:07:20
3	António Pinto	Portugal	2:08:57
4	Sam Nyangincha	Kenya	2:09:36
5	Gilbert Rutto	Kenya	2:11:12
6	Xolile Yawa	South Africa	2:11:56
7	Davide Milesi	Italy	2:11:58
8	Bruno Leger	France	2:12:16
9	Vanderlei de Lima	Brazil	2:13:48
10	Carlos Patrício	Portugal	2:15:28

=== Women ===
Position	Athlete	Nationality	Time
1	Uta Pippig	Germany	2:25:37
2	Angelina Kanana	Kenya	2:27:41
3	Rakiya Maraoui	Morocco	2:28:17
4	Olga Appell	United States	2:29:16
5	Maria Curatolo	Italy	2:31:12
6	Albertina Machado	Portugal	2:33:04
7	Adriana Barbu	Romania	2:34:10
8	Suzanne Rigg	United Kingdom	2:34:21
9	Helena Javornik	Slovenia	2:34:29
10	Wilma van Onna	Netherlands	2:38:09
