= Pete Pfitzinger =

American former distance runner

Peter Dickson Pfitzinger (born August 29, 1957, in Camden, New Jersey) is an American former distance runner, who later became an author, exercise physiologist and sports administrator.

He is best known for his accomplishments in the marathon, an event in which he represented the United States as its top finisher in two Summer Olympic Games: the Los Angeles Olympics (where Pfitzinger finished 11th) and the 1988 Seoul Olympics (where he placed 14th).

== Marathon career ==
In the 1984 Olympic Marathon Team Trials in Buffalo, New York, Pfitzinger became immediately known among American marathoners by taking the lead halfway through the race, relinquishing it in the final mile, then storming past the heavily favored Alberto Salazar in the final fifty yards to win the race, in a time of 2:11:43. In the 1988 Olympic Marathon Team Trials, held in Jersey City, New Jersey, Pfitzinger finished 3rd in a time of 2:13:09, to qualify for his second Olympic Games.

In other marathons apart from the Olympic Trials and Olympic Games, Pfitzinger won the National Sports Festival (Syracuse, New York) marathon in 1981, the Winstones (New Zealand) marathon in 1983, and the San Francisco Marathon in 1983 and 1986. He was 2nd at the Montreal (Canada) marathon in 1983. He was 3rd at the Nike OTC Marathon in 1981 and at the New York City Marathon in 1987.

He was a consistent performer: All but his first 3 career marathons were run in times between 2:11:43 - 2:15:21 (2 in 2:11, 4 in 2:12, 3 in 2:13, 3 in 2:14, and 1 in 2:15). He won 8 of his 16 marathons, and finished 2nd or 3rd in 4 others. Apart from the Olympic Games marathons, his only other finishes outside the top 3 were at the 1986 New York City Marathon (9th) and at the 1985 Marathon World Cup (Hiroshima, Japan), where he finished 18th.

Pfitzinger was awarded the DeCelle Award in 1984 by USA Track & Field as America's best male long distance runner. In 1984, he was ranked #1 U.S. Marathoner by Track & Field News and was named the Road Runners’ Club of America Male Runner of the Year. Pfitzinger was also inducted into the Road Runners Club of America Hall of Fame and Cornell University Athletics Hall of Fame.

== Personal life ==
Growing up, Pfitzinger lived in Haddonfield, NJ, Glenmont, NY, Westport, CT and Pittsford, NY. His running career started in high school in Pittsford, running 9:18.4 for two miles. Pfitzinger is a 1979 graduate of Cornell University. During college, he was the Heptagonal 10,000m Champion in 1977 and the Heptagonal Indoor 3 Mile Champion in 1978 and set the course record for the Cornell cross country course.

He also holds a Master of Business Administration from Cornell's Johnson Graduate School of Management and a Master of Science in exercise science from the University of Massachusetts at Amherst.

Pfitzinger is the co-author of two highly popular training books for distance runners - Advanced Marathoning (with Scott Douglas) and Faster Road Racing (with Philip Latter). He was formerly also a senior writer for Running Times Magazine.

Pfitzinger's wife, Christine Pfitzinger, is also a former world-class runner. The Pfitzingers have lived in New Zealand—Chrissey's country of origin—since 1997.

== Achievements ==
Year	Competition	Venue	Position	Notes	
July 1981	U.S. National Sports Festival	Syracuse, New York	1st	Marathon	2:15:20
Sept 1981	Nike Oregon Marathon	Eugene, Oregon	3rd	Marathon	2:12:41
July 1983	San Francisco Marathon	San Francisco, California	1st	Marathon	2:14:45
Sept 1983	Montreal Marathon	Quebec, Canada	2nd	Marathon	2:12:33
Nov 1983	Winstones Marathon	Auckland, New Zealand	1st	Marathon	2:12:19
May 1984	U.S. Olympic Trials	Buffalo, New York	1st	Marathon	2:11:43
Aug 1984	Olympic Games	Los Angeles, California	11th	Marathon	2:13.53
April 1985	World Cup Marathon	Hiroshima, Japan	18th	Marathon	2:12:28
July 1986	San Francisco Marathon	San Francisco, California	1st	Marathon	2:13:29
Nov 1986	New York City Marathon	New, York, NY	9th	Marathon	2:14:09
Nov 1987	New York City Marathon	New, York, NY	3rd	Marathon	2:11:54
April 1988	U.S. Olympic Trials	Jersey City, NJ	3rd	Marathon	2:13:09
Oct 1988	Olympic Games	Seoul, South Korea	14th	Marathon	2:14.44
