= Wachau Marathon =

Annual race in Austria held since 1998

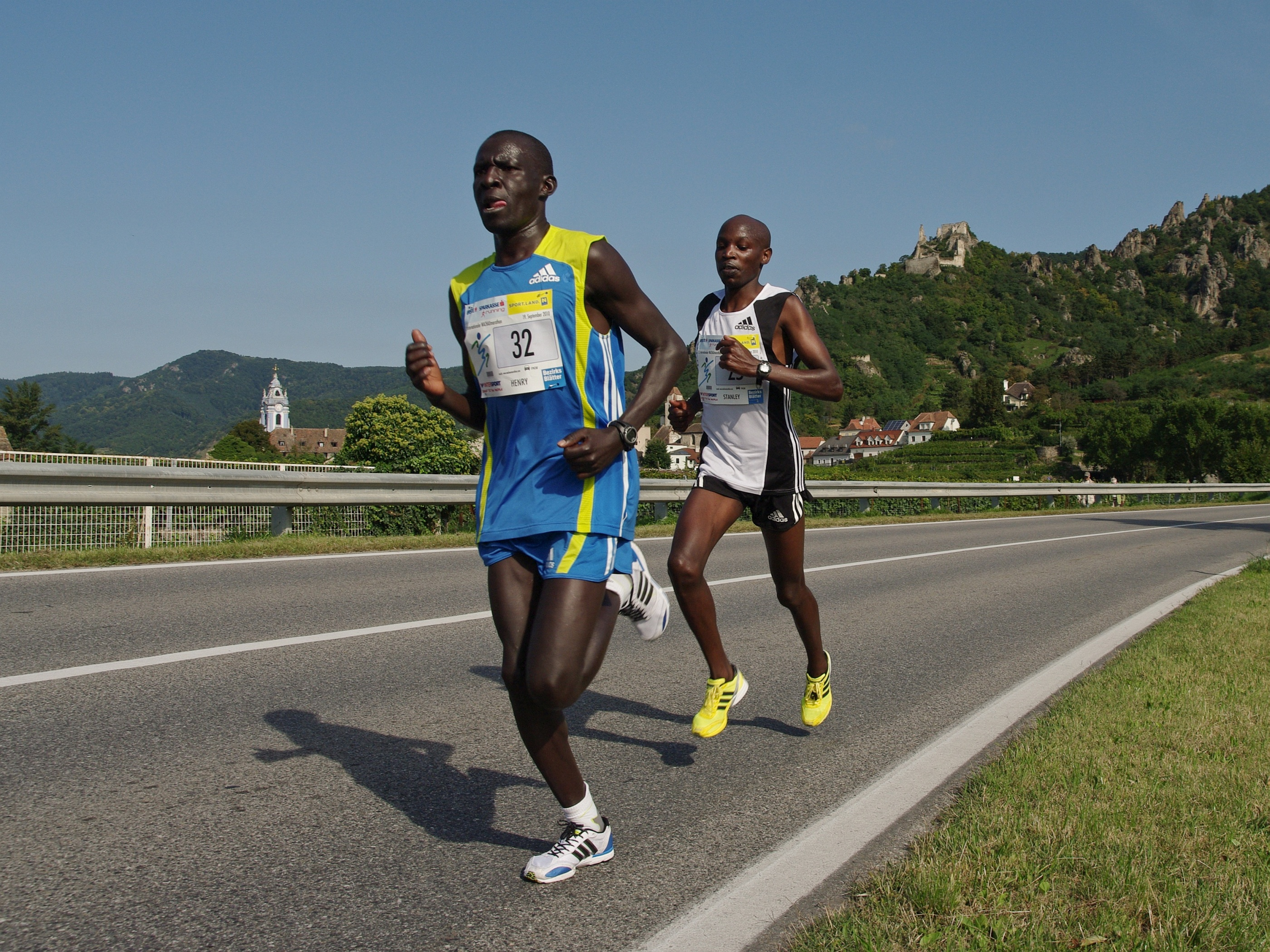
- Half marathoners passing through Dürnstein in 2010. The blue tower of Dürnstein Abbey is visible on the left, and Dürnstein Castle on the hill on the right.
- Date: September
- Location: Emmersdorf to Krems, Austria
- Event type: Road
- Distance: Marathon; Half marathon Quarter marathon
- Established: 1998 (28 years ago)
- Course records: Men: 2:12:32 (2003); John Kipngeno Rotich; Women: 2:33:33 (2002); Karina Szymańska; Half; Men: 59:53 (2016); Peter Cheruiyot Kirui; Women: 1:09:21 (2018); Perendis Lekapana
- Website: www.wachaumarathon.com
- Participants: 7,000 (in all races)

The Wachau Marathon (stylized as WACHAUmarathon) is a 26.2-mile foot race on paved roads along the Danube River from Emmersdorf to Krems an der Donau in Wachau, Austria, usually held in September. The race was founded in 1998, and its course is certified by World Athletics. It has hosted the Austrian National Championships thrice before.

The event also includes a half marathon, a race of length 11 km (6.8 mi), and races for children. There were more than 7,000 participants in total for 2019.

== History ==
The marathon was first held in 1998.

After Helmut Paul led the event for ten years, another company under the leadership of Michael Buchleitner took over the responsibility for the run in 2008.

The Austrian National Championships have been held three times as part of the Wachau Marathon. In 2002, the Austrian marathon champions were Max Wenisch (2:27:48, 7th overall male) and Veronika Kienbichl (2:53:09, 8th overall female). In 2007, the Austrian half marathon champions were Eva-Maria Gradwohl (1st overall female) and Martin Pröll (1:05:31). In 2010, the Austrian half marathon champions were Andrea Mayr (1:14:21, 3rd overall) and Günther Weidlinger (1:04:59, 7th overall).

The 2020 edition of the race was cancelled due to the coronavirus pandemic, with registrants receiving a refund via a voucher. (Note: Those who had elected to purchase race insurance would receive their entry fee back.)

== Course ==
External image
- Course map of full marathon in 2019

The course is described as fast and flat with beautiful scenery. The route first leads 3 km (1.9 mi) upstream on the left bank of the Danube, turns and then runs downstream to the center of Krems for the finish. The half marathon starts in Spitz, and the "quarter marathon" in Dürnstein.

== Other races ==
During the race weekend, there is also a half marathon favored by competitive runners that often has a deep international field. The shortest race is 11 km (6.8 mi) long, marketed as a "quarter marathon". On the preceding day, children's runs are held over different distances.

From 2004 to 2007, an ultramarathon of length 53 km (33 mi) was offered, which was part of the European Ultramarathon Cup.

== Winners ==
=== Course records ===
Marathon

Men: 2:12:32, John Kipngeno Rotich (KEN), 2003
Women: 2:33:32, Karina Szymańska (POL), 2002

Half Marathon

Men: 59:53, Peter Cheruiyot Kirui (KEN), 2016
Women: 1:09:21, Perendis Lekapana (KEN), 2018

=== Marathon ===
Date	Men	Time	Women	Time
2020	cancelled due to coronavirus pandemic			
29 September 2019	Markus Marouschek (AUT)	2:38:48	Zuzana Korotviková (SVK)	3:12:14
23 September 2018	Wolfgang Wallner -6-	2:30:52	Elisabeth Smolle (AUT)	2:56:40
17 September 2017	Wolfgang Wallner -5-	2:32:23	Cornelia Krapfenbauer -2-	3:01:18
18 September 2016	Ben Gamble (GBR)	2:32:59	Christina Oberndorfer (AUT)	3:08:22
13 September 2015	Wolfgang Wallner -4-	2:38:06	Manuela Antosch (AUT)	3:11:10
14 September 2014	Wolfgang Wallner -3-	2:34:19	Cornelia Krapfenbauer (AUT)	3:04:03
15 September 2013	Wolfgang Wallner -2-	2:32:02	Veronika Limberger (AUT)	3:12:20
16 September 2012	Tobias Sauter (GER)	2:28:44	Gertraud Schneitl (AUT)	3:14:58
18 September 2011	Wolfgang Wallner (AUT)	2:36:20	Meta Steinbach-Olsson (SWE)	3:12:08
19 September 2010	Thomas Augustin (AUT)	2:35:39	Karin Freitag (AUT)	2:56:10
20 September 2009	Alexander Frühwirth -2-	2:44:16	Ingrid Eichberger -3-	2:59:34
14 September 2008	Alexander Frühwirth (AUT)	2:44:14	Réka Kovács (HUN)	3:14:04
16 September 2007	Béla Horváth (HUN)	2:37:06	Marija Vrajić (CRO)	3:03:53
17 September 2006	Erich Kokaly (AUT)	2:28:18	Ivana Martincová (CZE)	2:54:00
18 September 2005	Kidus Gebremeskel (ETH)	2:26:22	Ingrid Eichberger -2-	2:52:13
19 September 2004	Julius Randich (KEN)	2:23:11	Ingrid Eichberger (AUT)	2:54:16
14 September 2003	John Kipngeno Rotich (KEN)	2:12:32	Olena Roschko (UKR)	2:52:48
15 September 2002	Mykola Rudyk (UKR)	2:18:31	Karina Szymańska -3-	2:33:32
16 September 2001	Joseph Kanda (KEN)	2:15:35	Karina Szymańska -2-	2:42:33
17 September 2000	James Tanui (KEN)	2:14:32	Karina Szymańska (POL)	2:38:47
19 September 1999	János Zabari (HUN)	2:29:55	Ida Šurbek (SLO)	2:49:53
20 September 1998	Antal Szűcs (HUN)	2:21:35	Dana Hajná (CZE)	2:47:21

=== Half marathon ===
Year	Men	Time	Women	Time
2020	cancelled due to coronavirus pandemic			
2019	Charles Karanja Kamau (KEN)	1:01:01	Joyline Chemutai (KEN)	1:11:20
2018	Geoffrey Ronoh (KEN)	1:00:21	Perendis Lekapana -2-	1:09:21
2017	Peter Cheruiyot Kirui -2-	1:00:45	Polline Njeru (KEN)	1:10:38
2016	Peter Cheruiyot Kirui (KEN)	0:59:53	Perendis Lekapana (KEN)	1:09:49
2015	Benard Bett (KEN)	1:01:34	Viola Jelagat (KEN)	1:09:57
2014	Daniel Kinyua Wanjiru (KEN)	1:00:38	Joan Chelimo (KEN)	1:11:52
2013	Luka Rotich (KEN)	1:01:15	Polline Wanjiku (KEN)	1:10:48
2012	Robert Langat (KEN)	1:01:05	Magdalene Mukunzi (KEN)	1:10:26
2011	Geoffrey Ngugi Kanyanjua (KEN)	1:01:18	Alice Mogire (KEN)	1:12:28
2010	Weldon Kirui (KEN)	1:01:10	Mary Naali (TAN)	1:12:16
2009	Simon Kasmili (KEN)	1:05:03	Sabrina Mockenhaupt (GER)	1:12:49
2008	Wilson Kipkosgei Chemweno (KEN)	1:05:31	Eva-Maria Gradwohl -2-	1:14:33
2007	Jonathan Koilege (KEN)	1:04:17	Eva-Maria Gradwohl (AUT)	1:14:33
2006	Serhij Satschepa (UKR)	1:05:55	Dana Janečková (SVK)	1:18:02
2005	Stanley Kipkosgei Salil (KEN)	1:03:47	Tatjana Wilissowa (RUS)	1:13:44
2004	Eliud Tanui (KEN)	1:04:42	Simona Staicu -4-	1:14:30
2003	Michael Buchleitner -2-	1:04:10	Beáta Rakonczai (HUN)	1:09:45
2002	Augustin Togom (KEN)	1:03:33	Anikó Kálovics (HUN)	1:10:26
2001	Mykola Antonenko (UKR)	1:04:20	Simona Staicu -3-	1:14:22
2000	Zsolt Benedek (HUN)	1:05:18	Dagmar Rabensteiner (AUT)	1:15:29
1999	Francis Mbiu (KEN)	1:03:25	Simona Staicu -2-	1:13:33
1998	Michael Buchleitner (AUT)	1:02:58	Simona Staicu (ROM)	1:12:59

=== "Quarter marathon" ===
Year	Men	Time	Women	Time
2020	cancelled due to coronavirus pandemic			
2019	Martin Hofbauer (AUT)	0:37:32	Marie Glaser (AUT)	0:45:39
2018	Philipp Gintenstorfer -2-	0:38:08	Michaela Zwerger -2-	0:44:10
2017	Wolfgang Hiller -3-	0:36:28	Julia Mayer (AUT)	0:40:23
2016	Philipp Gintenstorfer (AUT)	0:36:34	Anita Baierl (AUT)	0:39:24
2015	Andreas Vojta (AUT)	0:34:08	Anna Glack (AUT)	0:44:29
2014	Wolfgang Hiller -2-	0:35:22	Annabelle-Mary Konczer (AUT)	0:38:39
2013	Wolfgang Hiller (AUT)	0:35:42	Michaela Zwerger (AUT)	0:41:10
2012	Manuel Wyss (SUI)	0:34:49	Kis Zsanett (HUN)	0:38:52
2011	Gerhard Gutmann (AUT)	0:37:32	Anna Hajdú (HUN)	0:42:03
2010	Christian Steinhammer (AUT)	0:33:06	Franziska Gruber (AUT)	0:41:29

=== Ultra marathon ===
Held from 2004 to 2007

Date	Men	Time	Women	Time
2007	Rene Fanninger (AUT)	3:40:08	Bärbel Lemme (GER)	4:14:12
2006	Alexander Frühwirth (AUT)	3:26:01	Henriette Holzknecht (AUT)	4:08:27
2005	Stefan Bosch (GER)	3:43:04	Heike Grob (GER)	4:18:20
2004	Günter Marhold (GER)	4:01:35	Manuela Skobek (AUT)	4:36:53
