= Baltimore Marathon =

Annual running event in Baltimore, Maryland

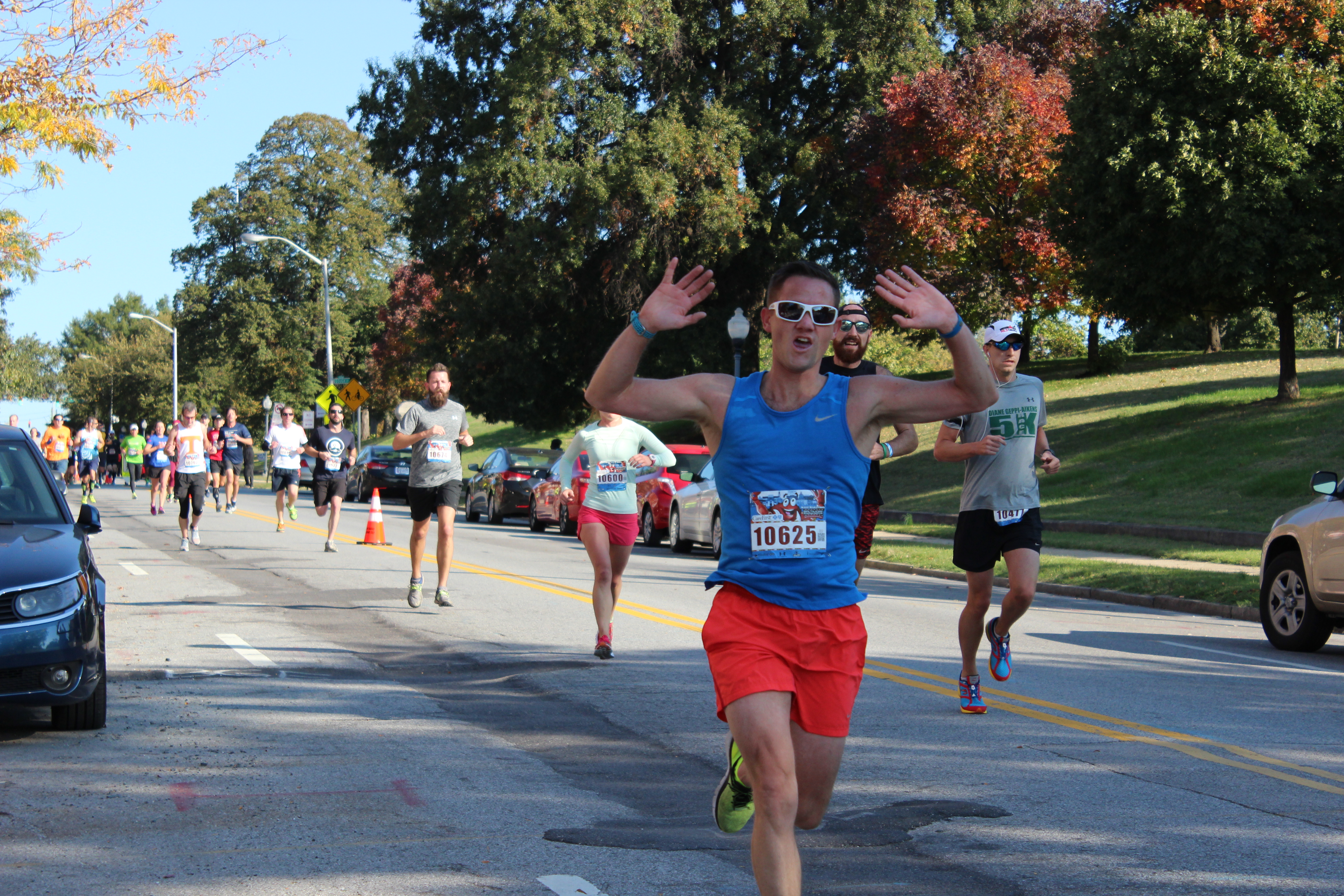
- Runners at the 2015 Baltimore Marathon
- Date: Mid-October
- Location: Baltimore, Maryland
- Event type: Road
- Distance: Marathon
- Established: 2001
- Course records: 2:11:56 (M) 2:29:11 (F)
- Website: www.thebaltimoremarathon.com

The Baltimore Marathon is the flagship race of several races held in Baltimore, Maryland known collectively as the Baltimore Running Festival.

The event was once one of the fastest-growing marathons in the United States, but the number of finishers in the marathon has declined each year since 2013. Additionally, the number of elite runners attending has almost disappeared since the elimination of prize money for winners following the 2012 running of the marathon. Currently Julius Kipyego Keter holds the men's record at 2:11:56 and Olena Shurkhno holds the women's record at 2:29:11.

The marathon begins at the Camden Yards sports complex and travels through many diverse neighborhoods of Baltimore, including the scenic Inner Harbor waterfront area, historic Federal Hill, Fells Point, and Canton, Baltimore. The race then proceeds to other important focal points of the city such as Patterson Park, Clifton Park, Lake Montebello, the Charles Village neighborhood and the western edge of downtown. After winding through 42.195 kilometres (26.219 mi) of Baltimore, the race ends in the Inner Harbor.

The competition was first held in 2001, but the city has featured marathon races prior to the current incarnation: the Maryland Marathon was held from 1973 to 1980 and this evolved into the Baltimore City Marathon, which was held from 1981 to 1989.

== Past winners ==
Key: Course record

Edition	Year	Men's winner	Time (h:m:s)	Women's winner	Time (h:m:s)
1st	1973	Victor Nelson (USA)	2:22:56.6	Kathrine Switzer (USA)	3:10:37
2nd	1974	Ron Hill (GBR)	2:17:23	Kathrine Switzer (USA)	3:05:51
3rd	1975	John Vitale (USA)	2:17:02	Liane Winter (GER)	2:53:23.2
4th	1976	Bill Rodgers (USA)	2:14:23	Lisa Matovcik (USA)	3:03:23
5th	1977	Garry Bjorklund (USA)	2:13:47	Marilyn Bevans (USA)	2:51:18
6th	1978	Jeff Bradley (USA)	2:19:36.2	Kathy Heckman (USA)	2:55:35
7th	1979	Jeff Foster (USA)	2:19:26	Marilyn Bevans (USA)	2:54:35
8th	1980	Jerome Drayton (CAN)	2:19:45	Jean Kerr (USA)	2:49:13
9th	1981	Christopher Stewart (GBR)	2:19:55	Kathy Heckman (USA)	2:49:12
10th	1982	Terry Rauch (USA)	2:26:22	Vera Thornhill (USA)	3:06:38
11th	1983 (Apr)	Matt Tobin (USA)	2:23:05	Margaret Rosasco (USA)	3:03:44
12th	1983 (Nov)	David Shafer (USA)	2:20:08	Pat Wilkerson (USA)	2:49:23
13th	1985	Zdzislaw Szmit (USA)	2:17:47	Nancy Kelly (USA)	2:53:51
14th	1986	Steve Molnar (USA)	2:27:34	Rose Malloy (USA)	2:55:45
15th	1987	Gordon Christie (CAN)	2:24:49	Christine Gibbons (USA)	2:51:49
16th	1988	Tom Stevens (USA)	2:22:42	Marianne Dickerson (USA)	2:41:05
17th	1989	Robert Yara (USA)	2:29:07	Cathy Ventura-Merkel (USA)	3:02:25
—	1990–2000	Not held	—	Not held	—
18th	2001	Luka Cherono (KEN)	2:19:46	Elvira Kolpakova (RUS)	2:52:08
19th	2002	Eric Kimaiyo (KEN)	2:17:44	Elvira Kolpakova (RUS)	2:50:01
20th	2003	Eric Kimaiyo (KEN)	2:18:41	Elvira Kolpakova (RUS)	2:48:50
21st	2004	John Itati (KEN)	2:14:51	Ramilya Burangulova (RUS)	2:40:21
22nd	2005	Mykola Antonenko (UKR)	2:15:40	Ramilya Burangulova (RUS)	2:42:00
23rd	2006	Yerefu Birhanu (ETH)	2:16:27	Rimma Dubovik (UKR)	2:35:45
24th	2007	John Itati (KEN)	2:16:24	Gladys Asiba (KEN)	2:36:27
25th	2008	Julius Kipyego Keter (KEN)	2:11:56	Maria Portilla (PER)	2:36:32
26th	2009	Alphonse Yatich Kibor (KEN)	2:14:04	Iuliia Arkhipova (KGZ)	2:32:09
27th	2010	David Ruto Kipkorir (KEN)	2:13:11	Olena Shurkhno (UKR)	2:32:17
28th	2011	Stephen Muange (KEN)	2:15:16	Olena Shurkhno (UKR)	2:29:11
29th	2012	Stephen Muange (KEN)	2:13:08	Elfheshe Yado (ETH)	2:38:46
30th	2013	David Berdan (USA)	2:30:05	Elizabeth Perry (USA)	2:58:00
31st	2014	Brian Rosenberg (USA)	2:33:27	Alex Wang (USA)	2:58:41
32nd	2015	David Berdan (USA)	2:30:21	Caitlin Gaughan (USA)	2:58:13
33rd	2016	Patrick Hearn (USA)	2:26:19	Caitlyn Tateishi (USA)	2:55:42
34th	2017	Jordan Tropf (USA)	2:29:06	Silvia Baage (USA)	2:58:36
35th	2018	Jeffrey Redfern (USA)	2:30:26	Julia Roman-Duval (FRA)	2:47:42
36th	2019	Jeremy Ardanuy (USA)	2:27:16	Natalie Atabek (USA)	2:58:57
—	2020	Not held	—	Not held	—
37th	2021	Jeremy Ardanuy (USA)	2:26:49	Joanna Hayes (USA)	3:10:11
38th	2022	Robert Creese (USA)	2:26:45	Julia Roman-Duval (USA)	2:46:48
39th	2023	Zachary Ripley (USA)	2:28:12	Emily Royston (USA)	2:52:23
40th	2024	Willy Fink (USA)	2:21:37	Sara Kenefick (USA)	3:03:41
