= 1979 Berlin Marathon =

6th Berlin Marathon
- Venue: Berlin, West Germany
- Date: 30 September

Champions
- Men: Ingo Sensburg (2:21:09)
- Women: Jutta von Haase (3:07:07)

The 1979 Berlin Marathon was the 6th running of the annual marathon race held in Berlin, West Germany, held on 30 September. West Germany's Ingo Sensburg won the men's race in 2:21:09 hours, while the women's race was won by West Germany's Jutta von Haase in 3:07:07. A total of 222 runners finished the race, comprising 207 men and 15 women.

== Results ==
=== Men ===
Rank	Athlete	Nationality	Time
1st place, gold medalist(s)	Ingo Sensburg	West Germany	2:21:09
2nd place, silver medalist(s)	Wilfried Jackisch	West Germany	2:24:53
3rd place, bronze medalist(s)	Ronald Scherbaum	West Germany	2:30:07
4	Michael Weiß	West Germany	2:30:19
5	Valentin Mudrik	West Germany	2:31:42
6	Pattrijk Macke	West Germany	2:32:24
7	Wolfgang Schröder	West Germany	2:34:15
8	Dietmar Gathmann	West Germany	2:35:08
9	Kevin Hodsman	West Germany	2:37:56
10	Wolfram Weber	West Germany	2:39:38

=== Women ===
Rank	Athlete	Nationality	Time
1st place, gold medalist(s)	Jutta von Haase	West Germany	3:07:07
2nd place, silver medalist(s)	Ursula Wedig	West Germany	3:35:45
3rd place, bronze medalist(s)	Marlies Neese	West Germany	3:41:31
