= 1976 Berlin Marathon =

3rd Berlin Marathon
- Venue: Berlin, West Germany
- Date: 26 September

Champions
- Men: Ingo Sensburg (2:23:08)
- Women: Ursula Blaschke (3:04:12)

The 1976 Berlin Marathon was the third running of the annual marathon race held in Berlin, West Germany, held on 26 September. West Germany's Ingo Sensburg won the men's race in 2:23:08 hours, while the women's race was won by another West German, Ursula Blaschke, in 3:04:12. A total of 311 runners finished the race, comprising 296 men and 15 women.

== Results ==
=== Men ===
Rank	Athlete	Nationality	Time
1st place, gold medalist(s)	Ingo Sensburg	West Germany	2:23:08
2nd place, silver medalist(s)	Wolfram Weber	West Germany	2:24:59
3rd place, bronze medalist(s)	Michael Weiß	West Germany	2:26:27
4	K. Rathgen	West Germany	2:28:22
5	J. Rose	West Germany	2:32:17
6	P. Bieler	West Germany	2:33:38
7	M. Tschetschel	West Germany	2:36:12
8	G. Hallas	West Germany	2:38:44
9	P. Schwarz	West Germany	2:40:44
10	B. Hopp	West Germany	2:42:28

=== Women ===
Rank	Athlete	Nationality	Time
1st place, gold medalist(s)	Ursula Blaschke	West Germany	3:04:12
2nd place, silver medalist(s)	Jutta von Haase	West Germany	3:05:19
3rd place, bronze medalist(s)	Siegrid Sucker	West Germany	3:18:33
