= Athletics at the 1998 Asian Games – Women's marathon =

Women's marathon at the 1998 Asian Games
- Venue: Thammasat Stadium
- Dates: 6 December 1998
- Competitors: 12 from 10 nations

Medalists
gold medal	Naoko Takahashi	Japan
silver medal	Kim Chang-ok	North Korea
bronze medal	Tomoko Kai	Japan

The women's marathon competition at the 1998 Asian Games in Bangkok, Thailand was held on 6 December 1998.

== Schedule ==
All times are Indochina Time (UTC+07:00)

Date	Time	Event
Sunday, 6 December 1998	06:30	Final

== Results ==
Legend

- DNF — Did not finish

Rank	Athlete	Time	Notes
1st place, gold medalist(s)	Naoko Takahashi (JPN)	2:21:47	AR
2nd place, silver medalist(s)	Kim Chang-ok (PRK)	2:34:55	
3rd place, bronze medalist(s)	Tomoko Kai (JPN)	2:35:01	
4	Pan Jinhong (CHN)	2:37:29	
5	Ruwiyati (INA)	2:37:34	
6	Sunisa Pechpongprai (THA)	2:42:39	
7	Kim Hye-yong (KOR)	2:44:37	
8	Wang Yanfang (CHN)	2:58:13	
9	Sirivanh Ketavong (LAO)	3:28:40	
10	Radha Shrestha (NEP)	3:35:13	
—	Irina Bogacheva (KGZ)	DNF	
—	Gulsara Dadabayeva (TJK)	DNF	
