= 1980 Berlin Marathon =

7th Berlin Marathon
- Venue: Berlin, West Germany
- Date: 28 September

Champions
- Men: Ingo Sensburg (2:16:48)
- Women: Gerlinde Püttmann (2:47:18)

The 1980 Berlin Marathon was the 7th running of the annual marathon race held in Berlin, West Germany, held on 28 September. West Germany's Ingo Sensburg won the men's race in 2:16:48 hours, while the women's race was won by West Germany's Gerlinde Püttmann in 2:47:18. A total of 294 runners finished the race, comprising 276 men and 18 women.

== Results ==
=== Men ===
Rank	Athlete	Nationality	Time
1st place, gold medalist(s)	Ingo Sensburg	West Germany	2:16:48
2nd place, silver medalist(s)	Dave Clark	United Kingdom	2:19:33
3rd place, bronze medalist(s)	Roland Szymaniak	West Germany	2:23:50
4	Wilfried Jackisch	West Germany	2:26:01

=== Women ===
Rank	Athlete	Nationality	Time
1st place, gold medalist(s)	Gerlinde Püttmann	West Germany	2:47:18
2nd place, silver medalist(s)	Angelika Brandt	West Germany	2:49:53
3rd place, bronze medalist(s)	Bettina Köly	West Germany	2:59:05
