= 1987 New York City Marathon =

Footrace held in New York City

- Date: 1 November
- Location: New York City, NY (United States)
- Edition: 18th
- Organizer: New York Road Runners
- Website: Official website

The 18th New York City Marathon took place on Sunday 1 November.

== Results ==
=== Men ===
Place	Athlete	Nation	Time
1	Ibrahim Hussein	Kenya	2:11:01
2	Gianni Demadonna	Italy	2:11:53
3	Peter Pfitzinger	United States	2:11:54
4	Pat Petersen	United States	2:12:03
5	Tommy Ekblom	Finland	2:12:31
6	Orlando Pizzolato	Italy	2:12:50
7	Bogusław Psujek	Poland	2:13:38
8	Mirko Vindis	Yugoslavia	2:13:39
9	Hugh Jones	United Kingdom	2:14:05
10	Greg Meyer	United States	2:14:31

=== Women ===
Place	Athlete	Nation	Time
1	Priscilla Welch	United Kingdom	2:30:17
2	Françoise Bonnet	France	2:31:22
3	Jocelyne Villeton	France	2:32:03
4	Ria Van Landeghem	Belgium	2:32:38
5	Karolina Szabó	Hungary	2:34:58
6	Ágnes Sipka	Hungary	2:35:26
7	Laurie Crisp	United States	2:36:01
8	Monika Schäfer	West Germany	2:37:40
9	Robyn Root	United States	2:37:57
10	Nelly Aerts	Belgium	2:38:18
