= 1997 Berlin Marathon =

24th Berlin Marathon
- Venue: Berlin, Germany
- Dates: 28 September 1997

Champions
- Men: Elijah Lagat (2:07:41)
- Women: Catherina McKiernan (2:23:44)

The 1997 Berlin Marathon was the 24th running of the annual marathon race held in Berlin, Germany, held on 28 September 1997. Kenya's Elijah Lagat won the men's race in 2:07:41 hours, while the women's race was won by Ireland's Catherina McKiernan in 2:23:44.

== Results ==
=== Men ===
Position	Athlete	Nationality	Time
1	Elijah Lagat	Kenya	2:07:41
2	Eric Kimaiyo	Kenya	2:07:43
3	Sammy Lelei	Kenya	2:08:00
4	Jackson Kipngok	Kenya	2:08:36
5	Ronaldo da Costa	Brazil	2:09:07
6	Jackson Kabiga	Kenya	2:09:15
7	Andries Khulu	South Africa	2:09:36
8	Abdessalam Serrokh	Morocco	2:09:46
9	André Luiz Ramos	Brazil	2:09:50
10	Andrea Sambu	Tanzania	2:10:17

=== Women ===
Position	Athlete	Nationality	Time
1	Catherina McKiernan	Ireland	2:23:44
2	Madina Biktagirova	Russia	2:24:48
3	Marleen Renders	Belgium	2:26:18
4	Kayoko Obata	Japan	2:27:27
5	Renata Kokowska	Poland	2:29:38
6	Mayumi Ichikawa	Japan	2:30:26
7	Simona Staicu	Romania	2:31:12
8	Viviane de Oliveira	Brazil	2:31:39
9	Kaori Yamauchi	Japan	2:37:39
10	Anna Rybicka	Poland	2:39:48
