= Mykola Antonenko =

Ukrainian runner

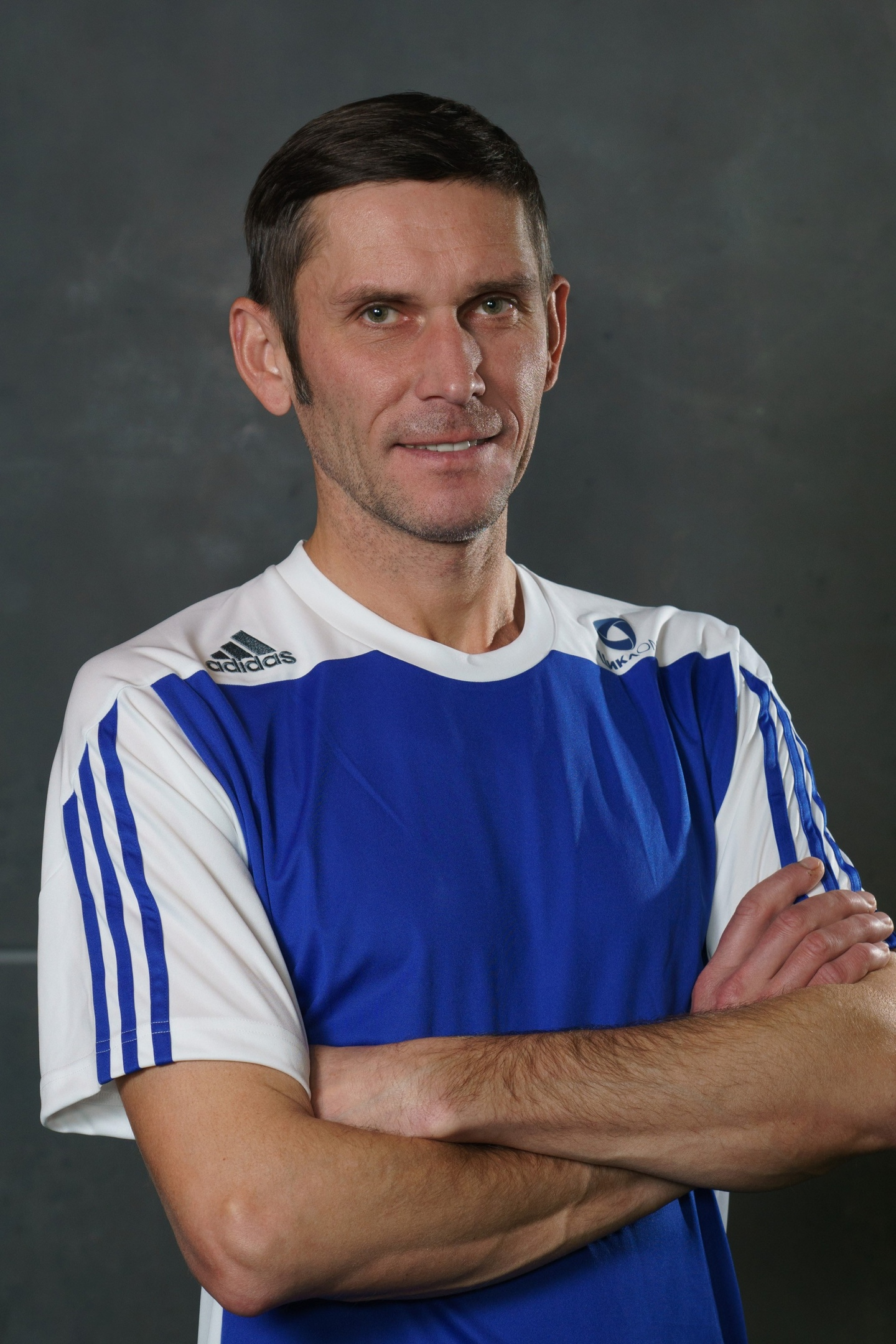

Personal information
- Nationality: Ukraine
- Born: September 2, 1972 (age 53) Severodonetsk, Ukraine
- Height: 6’ 2”
- Weight: 163

Sport
- Sport: long-distance running
- Events: 10,000 meters, half marathon, marathon
- Coached by: Shevtsov Leonid Vladimirovich

Achievements and titles
- Personal bests: 10,000 meters: 30:26; Half Marathon: 1:04:22; Marathon: 2:10:54

Mykola Antonenko (Ukrainian: Микола Петрович Антоненко; born September 2, 1972) is a Ukrainian middle- and long-distance runner, and Ukrainian national champion in the 10K. He is the winner of multiple notable road races and a top finisher in major international races.

== Running career ==
At the age of 16, Antonenko won the Ukrainian junior 5000 metres championship. A year later, he became the 3-kilometer junior champion of the USSR in the labor reserves.

He began training at longer distances after leaving the reserves, and found he could compete with the fastest runners in his nation. He became a member of the Ukrainian national marathon team.

In 1998 and 1999, he finished in the top five finishers at the Košice Peace Marathon with times of 2:17:05 (fifth place) and 2:18:14 (fourth place).

Nearly each year from 1995 to 2001, he ran and won the AIMS-certified Bratislava, Slovakia, full or half marathon, clocking 2:18:23 in his best marathon, establishing a presence in the European running community.

In 2001, he ran in the Wachau Half Marathon in Krems, Austria, the course of which follows the Danube River and draws strong competition. Keeping with a fast pace from the start, he won the race in 1:04:22, beating out more than 6,000 other runners.

The time would stand as a personal best, although he would come close to breaking it at the Carlsbad Half Marathon, when he ran 1:04:40 for a second-place finish behind Ibrahim Mohamed Aden.

In 2002, placed 10th in the Vienna City Marathon, keeping pace with the other marathon elite as one of only two non-Africans to finish in 2:15:45.

That fall, he won the Kleine Zeitung Graz Marathon, pushing his personal best to a faster 2:15:28.

In 2003, he came in second in the Hannover Marathon in 2:16:38

In 2004, he finished second in the Twin Cities Marathon, the Las Vegas Marathon and the Austin Marathon (2:14:43).

He had a breakthrough in America when he came to Baltimore, Maryland in 2005 to race the marathon. Antonenko toed the starting line on a warm morning. He ran with the lead pack as the heat increased, and eventually sped past former Olympian Mindaugas Pukštas and several international competitors to win the Baltimore Marathon in 2:15:40. After the race, many runners were treated for heat exhaustion 15 runners were taken to emergency rooms. He won $15,000 for the win and became even more widely known in the Ukrainian athletic community.

In April 2006, he finished fourth at the Nagano Olympic Commemorative Marathon in Japan in 2:13:28.

In September 2006, Antonenko ran in the Ukrainian 10K National Championship race in Slavyansk, Ukraine. He won the race and earned the title of “Master of Sports of International Class.”

Then in October, he returned to Baltimore. In a contrast to the year before, the 3,000 contestants lined up to cooler weather: 36 degrees. Antonenko again kept pace with the lead international pack. He remained in third with less than five miles to go, but kicked past Kenyan Wilson Komen as they went through the 23rd mile to secure second place in 2:16:55.

2007 was another big year for Antonenko. He returned to the United States, and decided to run the Twin Cities Marathon again. At 35, he was older than some of the world-class competition. He had to travel for two full days before arriving in Minneapolis, Minnesota, where the marathon started. On race morning, the usually cool northern October air was heating up the 8,106 marathon starters. At the sound of the gun, it was 72 degrees with around 90 percent humidity. The start was slow, and Antonenko bolted at mile 7 as he turned to follow Minnehaha Creek to the Mississippi River. He kept taking water, holding tempo, and increasing a significant lead over the other racers. “I wasn’t certain I could win,” he said afterward. “It would be unprofessional to have such thoughts.”

But he pumped his fists at the finish, crossed in 2:13:54 and won $25,000.

In 2008, he finished 9th in the Rome Marathon, the only non-Kenyan or Ethiopian in the top 10. He finished in 2:11:57. He also ran the SSE Airtricity Dublin Marathon, finishing 5th in 2:14:54.

On May 10, 2009, he captured his best marathon time, finishing 4th in the Prague Marathon with a time of 2:10:54, right behind the world-record holder for a masters marathon, Kenneth Mburu Mungara.

In 2010 he finished 5th at the Ljubljana Marathon in Slovenia on October 24.

In 2011, he ran the famed Chuncheon Marathon in South Korea.

In 2013, he finished 8th in the Mainz Marathon in 2:30:11.

== Early and personal life ==
Antonenko was born and raised in Severodonetsk, Luhansk Province in Ukraine. Antonenko started running and at by the age of 15 began competing in shorter distances around the country. Later in life, as he competed internationally, he lived in Donyetsk and trained in the Western Caucasus Mountains.
