= Gianni Demadonna =

Italian long-distance runner (born 1954)

Personal information
- Full name: Giovanni Demadonna
- Nationality: Italian
- Born: 14 June 1954 (age 72)

Sport
- Country: Italy
- Sport: Athletics
- Event: Long-distance running

Achievements and titles
- Personal bests: Half marathon: 1:03.34 (1982); Marathon: 2:11.53 (1987)

Gianni Demadonna (born 14 June 1954) is a former Italian male long-distance runner who competed at five editions of the IAAF World Cross Country Championships (from 1977 to 1987). He also won a national championship at the senior level. He currently works as an athletics agent.

== Achievements ==
| Year | Competition | Venue | Position | Event | Time | Notes |
|---|---|---|---|---|---|---|
| 1987 | New York City Marathon | (United States) New York City | 2nd | Marathon | 2:11:53 | PB |
