= 1981 Berlin Marathon =

Road running event in Berlin, West Germany

8th Berlin Marathon
- Venue: Berlin, West Germany
- Date: 27 September

Champions
- Men: Ian Ray (2:15:42)
- Women: Angelika Stephan (2:47:24)
- Wheelchair men: Georg Freund (2:08:44)

The 1981 Berlin Marathon was the 8th running of the annual marathon race held in Berlin, West Germany, held on 27 September. Great Britain's Ian Ray won the men's race in 2:15:42 hours, while the women's race was won by West Germany's Angelika Stephan in 2:47:24. Ray was the first non-West German winner of the race. A men's wheelchair race was held for the first time and was won by West German Georg Freund in 2:08:44. No women entered the wheelchair section. A total of 2567 runners finished the race, comprising 2418 men and 149 women.

== Results ==
=== Men ===
Rank	Athlete	Nationality	Time
1st place, gold medalist(s)	Ian Ray	United Kingdom	2:15:42
2nd place, silver medalist(s)	Mick Hurd	United Kingdom	2:17:44
3rd place, bronze medalist(s)	Dave Clarke	United Kingdom	2:20:10
4	John Dimick	United States	2:20:46
5	Richard Umberg	Switzerland	2:21:55
6	John Robertshaw	West Germany	2:23:07
7	Bent Larsson	Denmark	2:23:25
8	Alessandro Rasello	Italy	2:24:02
9	Peter Alt	West Germany	2:24:51
10	John Bicourt	United Kingdom	2:25:13
11	Thorbjoern Larsen	Norway	2:25:15
12	Jodmund Rualquam	Norway	2:25:59
13	Peter Morawski	West Germany	2:26:11
14	Ingo Sensburg	West Germany	2:27:01
15	Andreas Jost	West Germany	2:28:36
16	Ray Maule	United Kingdom	2:28:44
17	Michael Heine	West Germany	2:29:59
18	Michael Weiss	West Germany	2:30:50
19	Risto Issakainen	Finland	2:31:59
20	Hagen Jaedicke	West Germany	2:32:38

=== Women ===
Rank	Athlete	Nationality	Time
1st place, gold medalist(s)	Angelika Stephan	West Germany	2:47:24
2nd place, silver medalist(s)	Gillian Castka	United Kingdom	2:50:45
3rd place, bronze medalist(s)	Liane Winter	West Germany	2:53:56
4	Catherina Bakker	Netherlands	2:54:39
5	Leslie Watson	United Kingdom	2:55:34
6	Jutta von Haase	West Germany	2:58:13
7	Monika Kuno	West Germany	2:57:30
8	Elisabeth Schuh	Venezuela	3:02:26
9	Elena Dugono	Italy	3:02:51
10	Eva-Marie Lehmann	West Germany	3:05:26
