= Andrew Letherby =

Australian long-distance runner

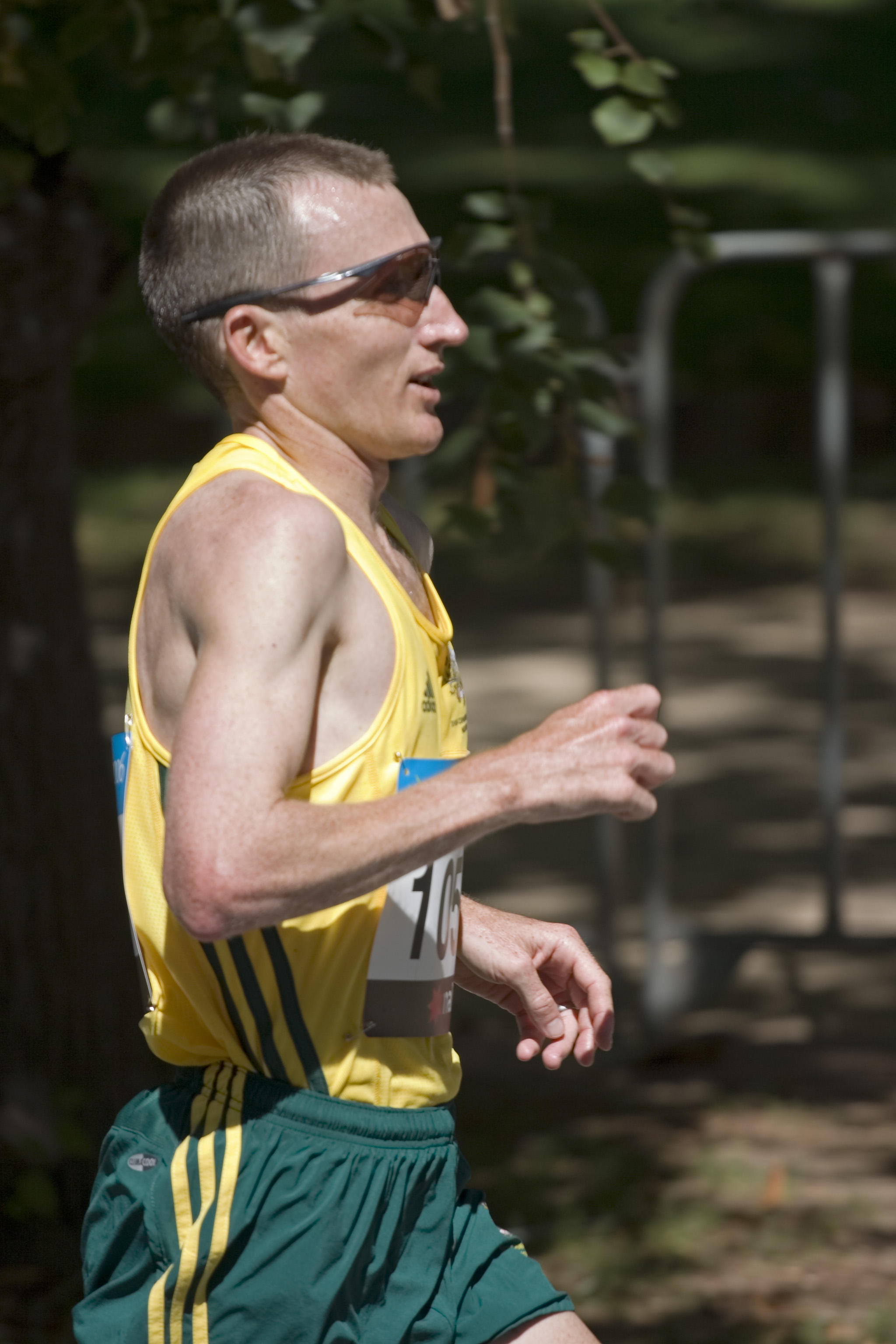

Personal information
- Born: Andrew Letherby; 19 September 1973 (age 53) Modbury, Adelaide, Australia
- Height: 1.65 m (5 ft 5 in)
- Weight: 54 kg (119 lb)

Sport
- Country: Australia
- Sport: Athletics
- Event: Long-distance running
Medal record
Men's Athletics
Commonwealth Games
Bronze medal – third place	2002 Manchester	Marathon

Andrew Letherby (born 19 September 1973) is an Australian former long-distance runner who won a bronze medal in the marathon at the 2002 Commonwealth Games.

== Biography ==
=== Early life ===
Letherby, originally from Adelaide, later lived in Queensland, before taking up an athletics scholarship at Georgia State University in 1994. He graduated with a Bachelor of Science degree and in 2001 married an American, Meg, with whom he moved to Boulder, Colorado, where he remained based during his athletics career.

=== Career ===
At the 2002 Commonwealth Games in Manchester, Letherby finished in third position, behind Francis Naali and Joshua Chelanga. He won a sprint finish for the bronze medal against one of the pre-race favourites, Kenya's Erick Wainaina.

Other notable performances in the marathon over the next two years includes a 35th placing at the 2003 World Championships and finishing eighth at both the 2004 and 2005 Boston Marathons.

His personal best in the marathon was set at the 2005 Berlin Marathon, when he finished in eight position with a time of 2:11:42.

In 2006 he was the national champion in the 10,000 metres and came fifth in the marathon at the 2006 Commonwealth Games.

He was 30th in the marathon event at the 2009 World Championships.
