= 1976 European Athletics Indoor Championships – Men's 3000 metres =

The men's 3000 metres event at the 1976 European Athletics Indoor Championships was held on 21 and 22 February in Munich.

== Medalists ==
Gold	Silver	Bronze
Ingo Sensburg; West Germany	Józef Ziubrak; Poland	Ray Smedley; Great Britain

== Results ==
=== Heats ===
First 4 from each heat (Q) qualified directly for the final.

Rank	Heat	Name	Nationality	Time	Notes
1	2	Ray Smedley	Great Britain	8:02.4	Q
2	2	Ingo Sensburg	West Germany	8:02.4	Q
3	2	Józef Ziubrak	Poland	8:02.6	Q
4	2	Hans-Jürgen Orthmann	West Germany	8:02.8	Q
5	2	Dan Glans	Sweden	8:02.8	
6	1	Spilios Zacharopoulos	Greece	8:10.0	Q
7	1	Štefan Polák	Czechoslovakia	8:10.0	Q
8	1	Fernando Cerrada	Spain	8:10.2	Q
9	1	Peter Weigt	West Germany	8:10.2	Q
10	1	Paul Copu	Romania	8:10.6	
11	1	Günther Hasler	Liechtenstein	8:28.4	
	1	Ruben Sørensen	Denmark	DNF	

=== Final ===
Rank	Name	Nationality	Time	Notes
1st place, gold medalist(s)	Ingo Sensburg	West Germany	8:01.6	
2nd place, silver medalist(s)	Józef Ziubrak	Poland	8:02.0	
3rd place, bronze medalist(s)	Ray Smedley	Great Britain	8:02.2	
4	Fernando Cerrada	Spain	8:02.8	
5	Štefan Polák	Czechoslovakia	8:03.2	
6	Peter Weigt	West Germany	8:03.2	
7	Spilios Zacharopoulos	Greece	8:05.2	
8	Hans-Jürgen Orthmann	West Germany	8:10.4	
