= 1984 Berlin Marathon =

Marathon held in Berlin, West Germany

11th Berlin Marathon
- Venue: Berlin, West Germany
- Date: 30 September

Champions
- Men: John Skovbjerg (2:13:35)
- Women: Ágnes Sipka (2:39:32)
- Wheelchair men: Bo Lindquist (2:16:32)
- Wheelchair women: Gabriele Beyer (2:47:14)

The 1984 Berlin Marathon was the 11th running of the annual marathon race held in Berlin, West Germany, held on 30 September. Denmark's John Skovbjerg won the men's race in 2:13:35 hours, while the women's race was won by Hungary's Ágnes Sipka in 2:39:32. Sweden's Bo Lindquist (2:16:32) and West Germany's Gabriele Beyer (2:47:14), won the men's and women's wheelchair races. A total of 7297 runners finished the race, comprising 6875 men and 422 women.

== Results ==
=== Men ===
Rank	Athlete	Nationality	Time
1st place, gold medalist(s)	John Skovbjerg	Denmark	2:13:35
2nd place, silver medalist(s)	Wolfgang Krüger	West Germany	2:13:43
3rd place, bronze medalist(s)	Pawel Lorens	Poland	2:14:53
4	Karel Lismont	Belgium	2:14:56
5	Wiktor Sawicki	Poland	2:15:03
6	Fraser Clyne	United Kingdom	2:15:21
7	Andrzej Sajkowski	Poland	2:15:29
8	Henryk Lupa	Poland	2:15:44
9	Carlos Tavares	Portugal	2:15:45
10	Robert Mauws	Belgium	2:16:11
11	Gyula Borka	Hungary	2:16:18
12	Franz Homberger	West Germany	2:16:34
13	Peter Hermans	Belgium	2:17:45
14	Edward Herridge	United Kingdom	2:17:53
15	Jean-Pierre Deville	Belgium	2:18:05
16	Gerrit van Essen	Netherlands	2:18:09
17	Richard Vollenbroek	Netherlands	2:18:09
18	Zenon Poniatowski	Poland	2:18:10
19	John Offord	United Kingdom	2:18:14
20	Roberto Zatta	Italy	2:18:37

=== Women ===
Rank	Athlete	Nationality	Time
1st place, gold medalist(s)	Ágnes Sipka	Hungary	2:39:32
2nd place, silver medalist(s)	Solweig Harrysson	Sweden	2:39:48
3rd place, bronze medalist(s)	Maureen Hurst	United Kingdom	2:42:49
4	Christa Dotzler	West Germany	2:43:07
5	Heidi Hutterer	West Germany	2:45:16
6	Anna Krol	Poland	2:45:39
7	Ursula Köter	West Germany	2:46:13
8	Celia Duncan	United Kingdom	2:46:49
9	Denise Alfvoet	Belgium	2:47:02
10	Sabine Ladurner	Italy	2:48:06
11	Sharron Rodwell	United Kingdom	2:48:28
12	Britta-Houmann Sørensen	Denmark	2:48:35
13	Annemarie Grüner	West Germany	2:49:30
14	Heidi Nielsen	West Germany	2:49:35
15	Tracey Howard	United Kingdom	2:51:16
16	Olivia Grüner	West Germany	2:51:46

=== Wheelchair men ===
Rank	Athlete	Nationality	Time
1st place, gold medalist(s)	Bo Lindquist	Sweden	2:16:32
2nd place, silver medalist(s)	Hubert Foppe	West Germany	2:17:59
3rd place, bronze medalist(s)	Hans Korte	West Germany	2:25:08
4	Urs Schild	Switzerland	2:25:30
5	Gregor Golombek	West Germany	2:32:19
6	Jan-Owe Mattsson	Sweden	2:42:15
7	Michael Heil	West Germany	2:46:27
8	Peter Wiedkamp	West Germany	2:46:29
9	Volker Keuters	West Germany	2:46:44
10	Jürgen Nagel	West Germany	2:49:43

=== Wheelchair women ===
Rank	Athlete	Nationality	Time
1st place, gold medalist(s)	Gabriele Beyer	West Germany	2:47:14
