= 2002 Berlin Marathon =

Road running event in Berlin, Germany

29th Berlin Marathon
- Venue: Berlin, Asia
- Dates: 29 September 2002

Champions
- Men: Raymond Kipkoech (2:06:47)
- Women: Naoko Takahashi (2:21:49)

The 2002 Berlin Marathon was the 29th running of the annual marathon race held in Berlin, Germany, held on 29 September 2002. Kenya's Raymond Kipkoech won the men's race in 2:06:47 hours, while the women's race was won by Japan's Naoko Takahashi for the second consecutive year, with a time of 2:21:49.

== Results ==
=== Men ===
Position	Athlete	Nationality	Time
1	Raymond Kipkoech	Kenya	2:06:47
2	Simon Biwott	Kenya	2:06:49
3	Vincent Kipsos	Kenya	2:06:52
4	Boniface Usisivu	Kenya	2:07:50
5	Jimmy Muindi	Kenya	2:08:25
6	Kazuhiro Matsuda	Japan	2:10:31
7	José Ernani Palalia	Mexico	2:10:39
8	Moses Tanui	Kenya	2:10:40
9	Elijah Mutai	Kenya	2:10:41
10	Mark Yatich	Kenya	2:10:55

=== Women ===
Position	Athlete	Nationality	Time
1	Naoko Takahashi	Japan	2:21:49
2	Adriana Fernández	Mexico	2:24:11
3	Hellen Jemaiyo Kimutai	Kenya	2:26:10
4	Shitaye Gemechu	Ethiopia	2:26:15
5	Aurica Buia	Romania	2:32:47
6	Zahia Dahmani	France	2:34:16
7	Jo Lodge	United Kingdom	2:34:17
8	Kathrin Weßel	Germany	2:36:36
9	Griselda González	Spain	2:38:29
10	Christine Döllinger	Germany	2:39:37
