= Ralf Bochröder =

German marathon runner (born 1940)

Personal information
- Born: 8 July 1940 (age 85)

Sport
- Sport: Athletics
- Event: Marathon

Achievements and titles
- Personal best: 2:47:08
Medal record
Men's athletics
Berlin Marathon
Representing West Germany
Gold medal – first place	1975 Berlin	Marathon

Ralf Bochröder (born 8 July 1940) is a German former marathon runner, who won the 1975 Berlin Marathon. His wife Kristin won the women's event at the 1975 Berlin Marathon, making them the only couple to win both events.

== Personal life ==
Bochröder worked as a maths and sport teacher. Bochröder retired from teaching in 1999.

He is married to Kristin Bochröder, a former judge and amateur marathon runner. In 1980, Kristin and Ralf had their only child. He has been friends with Günter Hallas, who won the 1974 Berlin Marathon.

== Career ==
Bochröder started as a sprinter before moving into middle-distance running. After an injury, he moved into long-distance running. He was a member of the Berlin Olympic Sports Club (OSC). In his sports career, Bochröder ran five marathons.

Bochröder and his wife attended the inaugural Berlin Marathon in 1974 as spectators. He ran the 1974 Boston Marathon, finishing in 3:05:00. In March 1975, he competed at the Wolfsburg marathon, finishing in a time of 2:52:00.

Bochröder won the 1975 Berlin Marathon in a time of 2:47:08. It was his personal best marathon time, and he finished over a minute ahead of the second placed competitor, Dieter Weiß. Bochröder was out of sight of the other competitors for the final 17 kilometres (11 mi) of the race, and was a surprise winner of the race. Bochröder's wife Kristin won the women's race at the 1975 Berlin Marathon. It is the only time that a husband and wife pair have both won the Berlin Marathon. Bochröder's victory was not well publicised at the time, and it was 23 years before German newspapers started reporting about the couple's victories in the 1975 Berlin Marathon, when he was interviewed during television coverage of the 1998 Berlin Marathon. The prize for winning the 1975 Berlin Marathon was a tape recorder. In 1978, he competed at the Neuf-Brisach marathon, finishing in a time of 2:55:00. His wife set her personal best time in the women's event.

As of 2003, Bochröder was still competing in running events, and is believed in his age category to be winning about two thirds of them. He has also worked as a volunteer for the Berlin Marathon.
