= Raymond Kipkoech =

Kenyan marathon runner

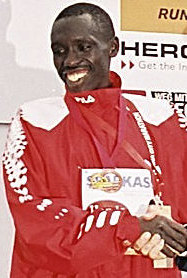
- Raymond Kipkoech at the 2004 Vienna Marathon awards ceremony

Personal information
- Full name: Raymond Kipkoech Chimwelo
- Born: 29 April 1978 (age 48) Kenya

Sport
- Sport: Athletics
Medal record
Marathon
World Marathon Majors
Representing Kenya
Gold medal – first place	2002 Berlin	Marathon

Raymond Kipkoech (born 29 April 1978) is a Kenyan marathon runner who won the 2002 Berlin Marathon. He also won the 2004 Venice Marathon, the 2005 Xiamen International Marathon, and the 2011 Jerusalem Marathon.

== Personal life ==
Kipkoech is from Kapsait, a Kenyan village at an elevation of around 3,000 metres (9,800 ft) close to Uganda. He has two brothers and three sisters. He is the cousin of fellow Kenyan marathon runner Eric Kimaiyo.

== Career ==
Kipkoech started running professionally in 2000. His coach was Italian Gabriele Rosa, who also trained Kenyan marathon runners Paul Tergat and Moses Tanui. Kipkoech's first marathon was the 2000 Turin Marathon, where he finished fifth. In 2002, Kipkoech won the Enschede Marathon, and came second at the Los Angeles Marathon. He secured his place at the 2002 Berlin Marathon a week before the race, after running 35 kilometres (22 mi) at altitude in Kenya. Kipkoech won the race in a final sprint with fellow Kenyans Simon Biwott and Vincent Kipsos. The top five finishers in the race were all Kenyan, and Kipkoech was an unexpected winner of the race. Kipkoech's finishing time was 2:06:47, which beat his previous personal best by over 4 minutes. It was suggested that if the race's pacemakers had run faster, Kipkoech would have had a chance of beating the world record, which was 2:05:38 at the time.

Kipkoech was invited to compete at the 2003 London Marathon due to his Berlin Marathon victory. He had to withdraw from the event due to an injury. He competed at the 2003 Berlin Marathon, his first marathon since winning the race in 2002. He finished fifth in the race. Later in the year, he came 13th at the 2003 New York City Marathon. In 2004, Kipkoech won the Venice Marathon, beating Italian Danilo Goffi by a fraction of a second. In the same year, Kipkoech came second at the Paris and Vienna City Marathons. In 2005, he won the Xiamen International Marathon after breaking away from Ethiopian Tekeste Kebede 37 kilometres (23 mi) into the race. His finishing time of 2:09:49 was the first time anyone had run faster than 2:10 at the Xiamen Marathon.

In 2011, Kipkoech won the Jerusalem Marathon, despite accidentally running to the half-marathon finish line rather than the marathon finish line. Robert Kipkoech Cheruiyot was first to cross the correct finish line, but Raymond Kipkoech was awarded the race ahead of Mutai Kopkorir and Kiman Njorage, who both also went to the incorrect finish line. Cheruiyot came fourth in the race.
