= Bogusław Psujek =

Polish long-distance runner

Bogusław Psujek (22 November 1956 – 21 April 1990) was a Polish long-distance runner who specialised in the marathon. His most prominent victory was at the 1986 Berlin Marathon, which he won in a course record of 2:11:03 hours. He also won the Beppu-Ōita Marathon in 1990. He achieved his highest global ranking of ninth in the 1990 season, with a then Polish national record run of 2:10:26 hours in a seventh-place finish at the 1987 London Marathon.

At international level he was a three-time competitor at the IAAF World Cross Country Championships, running in 1981, 1986 and 1987, and his best finish there was 114th. He represented his country on home turf in Warsaw at the 1987 IAAF World Cross Country Championships, placing 145th overall and helping Poland to 17th in the team rankings alongside Krzysztof Wesołowski, Bogusław Mamiński, Jan Huruk, Sławomir Gurny, and Andrzej Malicki. Psujek ran in the 1987 World Championships marathon later that year, but failed to finish. He also ran at the 1987 European Cup 10,000 m, placing 6th, and the 1988 European Marathon Cup, placing 33rd.

At the Polish national championships he won two indoor titles over 3000 metres, four outdoor titles in the 5000 metres and one title in the 10,000 metres. He was also a three-time winner of the Polish Cross Country Championships.

Among his individual performances were a win at the Cross Ala dei Sardi and Janusz Kusocinski Memorial in 1985, and two wins at the Trzebnica Sylwester Race in 1986 and 1987. In marathons, he placed seventh at the 1987 New York City Marathon and fourth at the 1988 Berlin Marathon.

Psujek was born in Krasnystaw and died in Szklarska Poręba. He died at the age of 33, having suffered a fall late at night outside the hotel he was staying at. He left a wife and two sons. He was a member of the WKS Oleśniczanka sports club and the club holds an annual memorial road running competition in his honour in Oleśnica.

== International competitions ==
Year	Competition	Venue	Position	Event	Notes
1981	World Cross Country Championships	Madrid, Spain	114th	Senior race	36:59
1981	World Cross Country Championships	Madrid, Spain	21st	Team race	700 pts
1986	World Cross Country Championships	Madrid, Spain	121st	Senior race	38:00.1
1986	World Cross Country Championships	Madrid, Spain	23rd	Team race	843 pts
1987	World Cross Country Championships	Warsaw, Poland	145th	Senior race	39:14
1987	World Cross Country Championships	Warsaw, Poland	17th	Team race	646 pts
1987	European Cup	Prague, Czechoslovakia	6th	10,000 m	29:08.63
1987	World Championships	Rome, Italy	—	Marathon	DNF
1988	European Marathon Cup	Huy, Belgium	33rd	Marathon	2:20:31

== Road races ==
Year	Race	Rank	Time
1986	Berlin Marathon	1st	2:11:03
1987	New York City Marathon	7th	2:13:38
1987	London Marathon	7th	2:10:26
1988	Berlin Marathon	4th	2:12:37

== National titles ==
- Polish Athletics Championships
  - 5000 m: 1981, 1982, 1985 (shared with Wojciech Jaworski), 1986
  - 10,000 m: 1986
- Polish Indoor Athletics Championships
  - 3000 m: 1982, 1985

== Personal bests ==
Event	Time	Location	Date
1500 metres	3:40.37	Zabrze, Poland	2 September 1984
3000 metres	7:55.7		1982
3000 metres steeplechase	8:43.54	Lublin, Poland	8 June 1984
Two miles	8:31.42	London, United Kingdom	26 August 1985
5000 metres	13:35.40	Sopot, Poland	2 August 1986
10,000 metres	28:28.53	Sopot, Poland	24 August 1986
Marathon	2:10:26	London, United Kingdom	10 May 1987

== See also ==
- List of 5000 metres national champions (men)
