= Naoko Takahashi =

Japanese long-distance runner

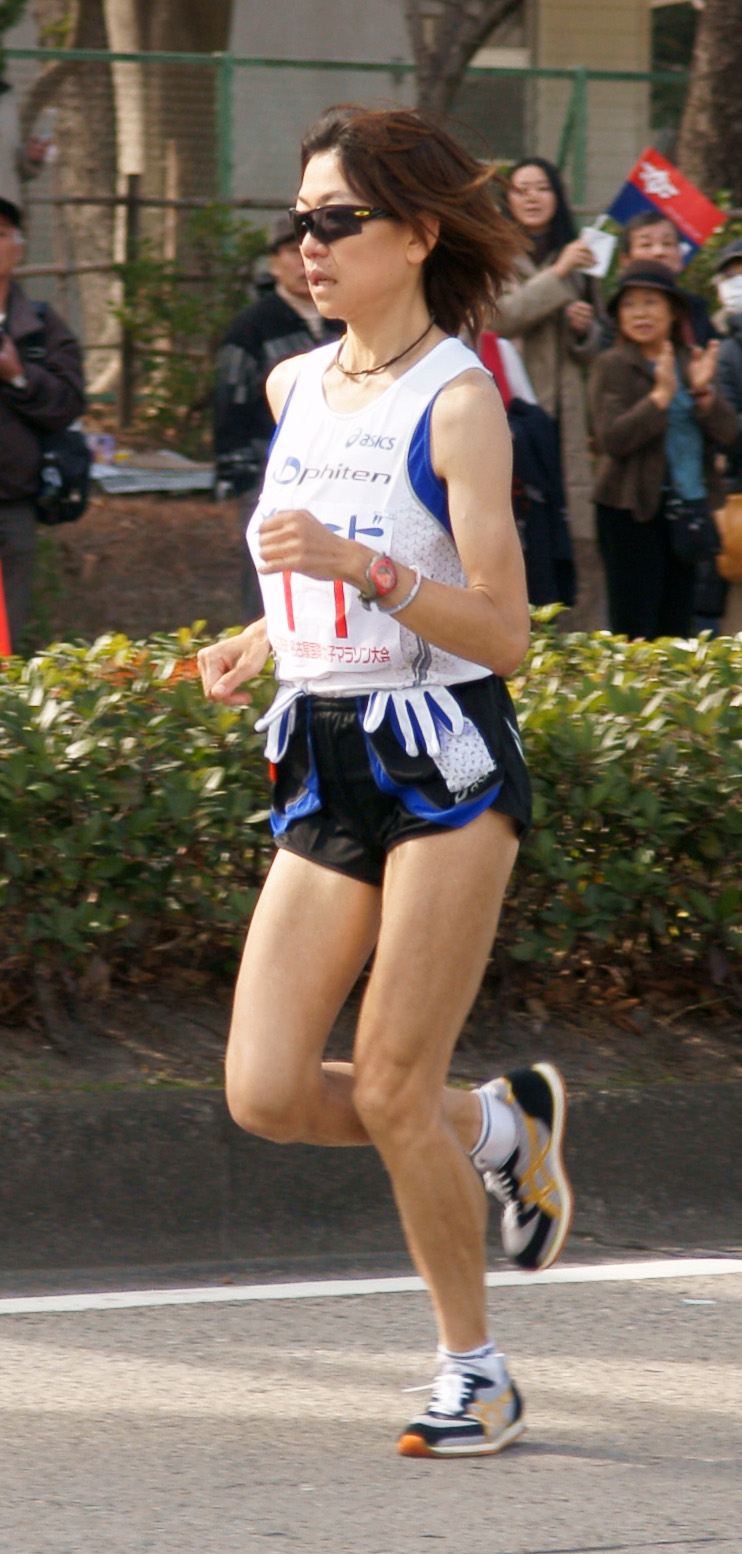
- Naoko Takahashi at the 2008 Nagoya Women's International Marathon

Medal record

Women's Athletics

Representing Japan

Olympic Games
Gold medal – first place	2000 Sydney	Marathon

Asian Games
Gold medal – first place	1998 Bangkok	Marathon

Naoko Takahashi (高橋 尚子, Takahashi Naoko; born May 6, 1972) is a Japanese retired long-distance runner and Olympic gold medal-winning marathoner. She won the gold medal in the marathon at the 2000 Sydney Olympics, and at the 2001 Berlin Marathon she became the first woman to complete a marathon in under 2 hours and 20 minutes.

== Biography ==
=== Early years ===
Takahashi was born in Gifu, Gifu Prefecture on May 6, 1972, the eldest daughter of educator Yoshiaki Takahashi and his wife Shigeko. Her father was a kindergarten principal. She is a second cousin-niece of chemist and Nobel Prize laureate Hideki Shirakawa.

=== Competitive career ===
Takahashi started running track in junior high school, and placed second in the 1500 meter and third in the 3000 meter races at the Japanese national collegiate championships while attending Osaka Gakuin University. Following graduation, she sought out the prominent distance running coach Yoshio Koide (coach) and began training under him. She supplemented her training regimen in Japan with altitude training in Colorado.

Takahashi competed in the finals of the 1997 World Championships 5000 meter race in Athens, where she finished in 13th place.

In March 1998, running in her second marathon, Takahashi set a Japanese women's record of 2:25:48 at the Nagoya Women's Marathon. Two months later, she won the 5000 meter race in the Osaka Japan Grand Prix with a time of 15:21.

Later in December of that same year, Takahashi set a new Japanese women's marathon record when she won the Asian Games marathon in Bangkok with a time of 2:21:47 under very warm conditions. She finished more than 13 minutes ahead of the second place finisher.

In March 2000, Takahashi earned a spot on Japan's Olympic women's marathon team after winning the Nagoya Women's Marathon in a time of 2:22:19. She went on to win the women's marathon at the 2000 Olympic Games in Sydney, with an Olympic record time of 2:23:14. It remained the fastest women's Olympic marathon until 2012 in London. Following her gold medal victory, Takahashi received the 2000 AIMS Best Marathon Runner Award as well as Japan's People's Honour Award.

At the 2001 Berlin Marathon, Takahashi became the first woman to break the 2 hour 20 minute barrier, finishing in a world record time of 2:19:46 and more than eight minutes ahead of the second place finisher, the previous world record holder Tegla Loroupe. The following year, Takahashi won the 2002 Berlin Marathon with a time of 2:21:49.

During her running career, Takahashi suffered from a series of injuries. She announced her retirement in October 2008.

=== Post-competitive career ===
The Gifu Seiryu Half Marathon was launched in 2011 with the honorary title being the Naoko Takahashi Cup. Takahashi serves as the chairwoman for the race.

Since her retirement from competitive running, Takahashi has also worked as a sportscaster, marathon commentator, served as a Japanese Olympic Committee (JOC) executive, and served as an executive member of the Japan Association of Athletics Federations (JAAF).

Takahashi is related to former Morning Musume leader Hitomi Yoshizawa.

== Achievements ==
- 2000 Olympic Games - Gold Medal
- 2001 Berlin Marathon - World Record, first woman to complete a marathon under 2:20

Year	Competition	Venue	Position	Event	Notes
Representing Japan
January 1997	Osaka Women's Marathon	Osaka, Japan	7th	Marathon	2:31:32
March 1997	Matsue Half Marathon	Matsue, Japan	1st	Half Marathon	1:10:35
March 1998	Nagoya Marathon	Nagoya, Japan	1st	Marathon	2:25:48
December 1998	Asian Games marathon	Bangkok, Thailand	1st	Marathon	2:21:47
May 1999	Kurobe Half Marathon, Kurobe	Kurobe, Japan	1st	Half Marathon	1:10:58
January 2000	Chiba Half Marathon	Chiba, Japan	1st	Half Marathon	1:08:55
March 2000	Nagoya Marathon	Nagoya, Japan	1st	Marathon	2:22:19
July 2000	Sapporo Half Marathon	Sapporo, Japan	1st	Half Marathon	1:09:10
September 2000	Sydney Olympics Marathon	Sydney, Australia	1st	Marathon	2:23:14
February 2001	Tokyo Ohme-Hochi 30 km	Tokyo, Japan	1st	30,000 m	1:41:57
September 2001	Berlin Marathon	Berlin, Germany	1st	Marathon	2:19:46 WR
September 2002	Berlin Marathon	Berlin, Germany	1st	Marathon	2:21:49
November 2003	Tokyo Marathon	Tokyo, Japan	2nd	Marathon	2:27:21
November 2005	Tokyo Marathon	Tokyo, Japan	1st	Marathon	2:24:39
November 2006	Tokyo Marathon	Tokyo, Japan	3rd	Marathon	2:32:22
March 2008	Nagoya Marathon	Nagoya, Japan	27th	Marathon	2:44:18
March 2009	Nagoya Marathon	Nagoya, Japan	29th	Marathon	2:52:23

Records
Preceded by (Kenya) Tegla Loroupe	Women's Marathon World Record Holder; 30 September 2001 – 7 October 2001	Succeeded by (Kenya) Catherine Ndereba
