= 1975 Berlin Marathon =

2nd Berlin Marathon
- Venue: Berlin, West Germany
- Date: 28 September

Champions
- Men: Ralf Bochröder (2:47:08)
- Women: Kristin Bochröder (3:04:12)

The 1975 Berlin Marathon, known as the Berlin Volksmarathon, was the second running of the annual marathon race held in Berlin, West Germany, held on 28 September. A West German husband and wife duo won the races, with Ralf Bochröder taking the men's race in 2:47:08 hours and Kristin Bochröder the women's race in 3:59:15. A total of 236 runners finished the race, comprising 232 men and 4 women.

== Results ==
=== Men ===
Rank	Athlete	Nationality	Time
1st place, gold medalist(s)	Ralf Bochröder	Germany	2:47:08
2nd place, silver medalist(s)	Dieter Weiß	Germany	2:48:26
3rd place, bronze medalist(s)	Hermann Brecht	Germany	2:50:02
4	Wolfgang Papenfuß	West Germany	2:53:30
5	Dietmar Gathmann	West Germany	2:54:26
6	Horst Zettlitz	West Germany	2:54:44
7	Manfred Wells	West Germany	2:56:13
8	Rohland Wächtler	West Germany	2:58:11
9	John Case	United States	2:58:35
10	Michael Heine	West Germany	2:58:55
11	Günter Hallas	West Germany	2:59:56
12	Alberto Tognetti	Italy	3:00:47

=== Women ===
Rank	Athlete	Nationality	Time
1st place, gold medalist(s)	Kristin Bochröder	Germany	3:59:15
2nd place, silver medalist(s)	Elfriede Kayser	Germany	4:26:05
3rd place, bronze medalist(s)	Astrid Ziezold	Germany	4:39:24
