= 2000 Berlin Marathon =

German Marathon

27th Berlin Marathon
- Venue: Berlin, Germany
- Dates: 10 September 2000

Champions
- Men: Simon Biwott (2:07:42)
- Women: Kazumi Matsuo (2:26:15)

The 2000 Berlin Marathon was the 27th running of the annual marathon race held in Berlin, Germany, held on 10 September 2000. Kenya's Simon Biwott won the men's race in 2:07:42 hours, while the women's race was won by Japan's Kazumi Matsuo in 2:26:15.

== Results ==
=== Men ===
| Position | Athlete | Nationality | Time |
|---|---|---|---|
| 1 | Simon Biwott | Kenya | 2:07:42 |
| 2 | Antoni Peña | Spain | 2:07:47 |
| 3 | Jackson Kabiga | Kenya | 2:09:52 |
| 4 | Takahiro Sunada | Japan | 2:10:08 |
| 5 | Paul Kiptanui | Kenya | 2:10:43 |
| 6 | Elias Chebet | Kenya | 2:11:06 |
| 7 | James Moiben | Kenya | 2:12:31 |
| 8 | Motsehi Moeketsana | South Africa | 2:12:47 |
| 9 | William Musyoki | Kenya | 2:12:54 |
| 10 | Moges Taye | Ethiopia | 2:13:35 |

=== Women ===
| Position | Athlete | Nationality | Time |
|---|---|---|---|
| 1 | Kazumi Matsuo | Japan | 2:26:15 |
| 2 | Franca Fiacconi | Italy | 2:26:42 |
| 3 | Zhang Shujing | China | 2:27:14 |
| 4 | Noriko Geji | Japan | 2:27:41 |
| 5 | Melanie Kraus | Germany | 2:27:58 PB |
| 6 | Helena Sampaio | Portugal | 2:29:34 |
| 7 | Hiromi Nakayama | Japan | 2:29:39 |
| 8 | Alina Ivanova | Russia | 2:31:26 |
| 9 | Sara Ferrari | Italy | 2:31:48 |
| 10 | Chantal Dällenbach | France | 2:33:56 |
