= 1988 Berlin Marathon =

15th Berlin Marathon
- Venue: Berlin, West Germany
- Date: 9 October

Champions
- Men: Suleiman Nyambui (2:11:45)
- Women: Renata Kokowska (2:29:16)
- Wheelchair men: Markus Pilz (1:52:08)
- Wheelchair women: Gabriele Schild (2:52:29)

The 1988 Berlin Marathon was the 15th running of the annual marathon race held in Berlin, West Germany, held on 9 October. Tanzania's Suleiman Nyambui won the men's race in 2:11:45 hours, while the women's race was won by Poland's Renata Kokowska in 2:29:16. West Germany's Markus Pilz (1:52:08) and Switzerland's Gabriele Schild (2:52:29), won the men's and women's wheelchair races. A total of 13,117 runners finished the race, comprising 11,986 men and 1131 women.

== Results ==
=== Men ===
Rank	Athlete	Nationality	Time
1st place, gold medalist(s)	Suleiman Nyambui	Tanzania	2:11:45
2nd place, silver medalist(s)	Spyros Andriopoulos	Greece	2:12:04
3rd place, bronze medalist(s)	Tulu Mekonnen	Ethiopia	2:12:29
4	Bogusław Psujek	Poland	2:12:37
5	Tesfaye Dadi	Ethiopia	2:12:49
6	Sergey Rozum	Soviet Union	2:13:09
7	Kenneth Stuart	United Kingdom	2:13:37
8	John Andrew Boyes	United Kingdom	2:14:16
9	Konrad Dobler	West Germany	2:14:17
10	Michel Constant	France	2:15:25
11	Jean Weijts	Belgium	2:15:34
12	Gerhard Hartmann	Austria	2:15:38
13	Wiesław Furmanek	Poland	2:15:41
14	Chala Urgessa	Ethiopia	2:15:51
15	Werner Grommisch	West Germany	2:15:59
16	Stanisław Zdunek	Poland	2:16:17
17	Helmut Schmuck	Austria	2:16:19
18	Agapius Masong	Tanzania	2:16:25
19	Sören Hellmark	Sweden	2:16:33
20	Dieter Notz	West Germany	2:16:43

=== Women ===
Rank	Athlete	Nationality	Time
1st place, gold medalist(s)	Renata Kokowska	Poland	2:29:16
2nd place, silver medalist(s)	Sheila Catford	United Kingdom	2:33:44
3rd place, bronze medalist(s)	Małgorzata Birbach	Poland	2:33:54
4	Ursula Starke	West Germany	2:35:58
5	Krystyna Chylińska	Poland	2:36:05
6	Marta Visnyei	Hungary	2:36:30
7	Ewa Szydlowska	Poland	2:36:55
8	Gabriela Gorzynska	Poland	2:36:58
9	Dimitra Papaspirou	Greece	2:37:04
10	Lyubov Svirskaya	Soviet Union	2:37:12
11	Irina Ruban	Soviet Union	2:37:59
12	Anne Roden	United Kingdom	2:38:24
13	Angelika Dunke	West Germany	2:38:42
14	Petra Liebertz	West Germany	2:39:42
15	Linda Milo	Belgium	2:39:46
16	Gizela Molnar	Hungary	2:40:00
17	Anne van Schuppen	Netherlands	2:42:23
18	Janina Saxer-Juszko	Switzerland	2:42:50
19	Beate Waeber	West Germany	2:42:55
20	Weronika Gierwatowska	Poland	2:42:55
