= Melanie Kraus =

German long-distance runner (born 1974)

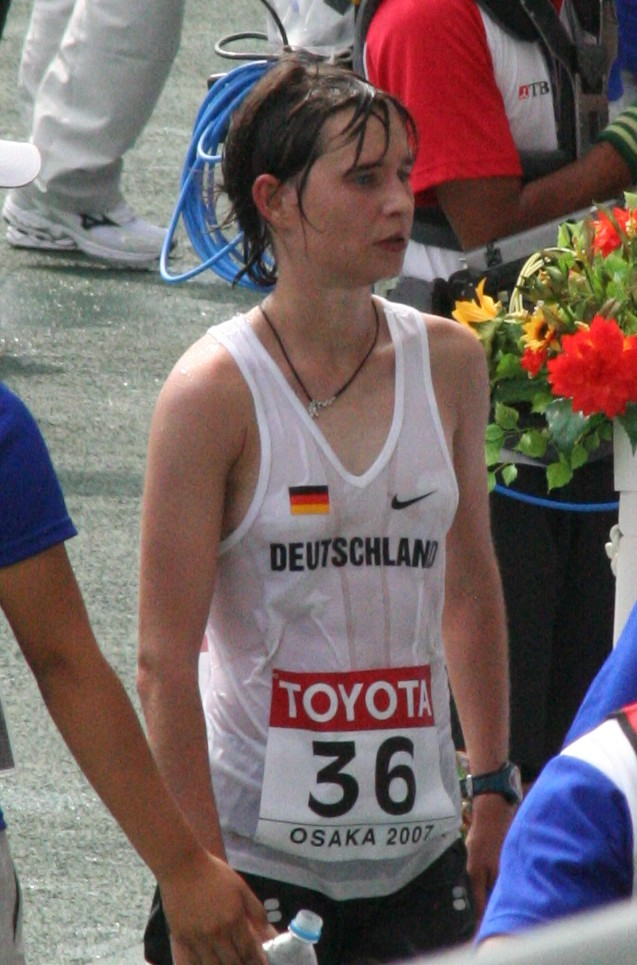
Melanie Kraus at the 2007 World Championships in Ōsaka

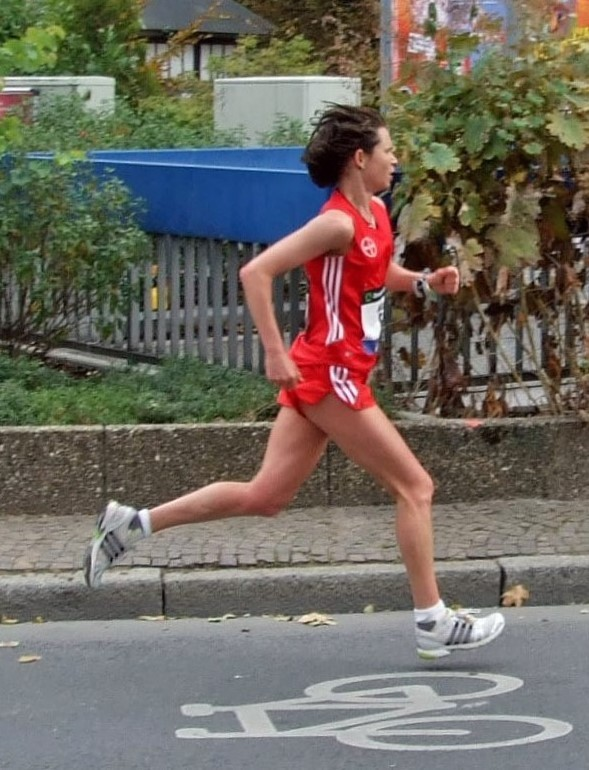
Frankfurt-Marathon 2007

Melanie Kraus (born 24 October 1974 in Mönchengladbach) is a German long-distance runner who specialises in track events and the marathon. She has won the Frankfurt Marathon and the Düsseldorf Marathon, but it was in the 2000 Berlin Marathon where she ran her fastest time of 2:27:58. She represented Germany at the 2008 Summer Olympics.

In 2001, she competed in the women's marathon at the 2001 World Championships in Athletics held in Edmonton, Alberta, Canada. She finished in 23rd place.

== Personal records ==
- 10,000 meters - 32:12.4 (1999) at Troisdorf
- Half marathon: 1:09:36 (1999) at Remich, Luxembourg
- Marathon (42.195 kilometers): 2:27:57 (2000) at Berlin
