= Kristin Bochröder =

German judge and marathon runner

Personal information
- Born: 6 May 1941 (age 85)

Sport
- Sport: Athletics
- Event: Marathon

Achievements and titles
- Personal best: 3:20:00
Medal record
Marathon
World Marathon Majors
Representing West Germany
Gold medal – first place	1975 Berlin	Marathon

Kristin Bochröder (born 6 May 1941) is a German former judge and marathon runner who won the 1975 Berlin Marathon. Her husband Ralf won the men's event at the 1975 Berlin Marathon, making them the only couple to win both events.

== Personal life ==
Bochröder was born on 6 May 1941. Her name is sometimes misspelt as Christin, although Bochröder insists that Kristin is the correct spelling. As a child, Bochröder suffered from tuberculosis, which hospitalised her for a year. She is married to Ralf Bochröder, a former teacher and middle-distance runner. In 1980, Kristin and Ralf had their only child. Bochröder worked as a judge in Schöneberg, and in her spare time, she enjoys playing the piano.

== Career ==
Bochröder was not a member of any athletics club. In total, Bochröder ran nine marathons. Bochröder and her husband attended the inaugural Berlin Marathon in 1974 as spectators. She competed in the 1974 Boston Marathon as the only amateur female athlete, finishing in a time of 4:28:00. Bochröder competed at the 1974 Athens Classic Marathon, the first time that women had competed at the event. She finished in a time of 4:48:00. In March 1975, she competed at the Wolfsburg marathon, finishing in a time of 3:55:00.

Bochröder won the 1975 Berlin Marathon in a time of 3:59:15. The weather was warm, and Bochröder had side cramps. She only became aware that she was winning the race on entering the Mommsenstadion, the location of the race finish. Only four women finished the event, and Bochröder was almost 27 minutes ahead of the second placed woman, Elfriede Kayser. Bochröder's husband Ralf won the men's race at the 1975 Berlin Marathon. It is the only time that a husband and wife pair have both won the Berlin Marathon. In 1978, Bochröder set her personal best time of 3:20:00 at the Neuf-Brisach marathon.
