= 1987 Berlin Marathon =

14th Berlin Marathon
- Venue: Berlin, West Germany
- Date: 4 October

Champions
- Men: Suleiman Nyambui (2:11:11)
- Women: Kerstin Preßler (2:31:22)
- Wheelchair men: Gregor Golombek (1:46:52)
- Wheelchair women: Margit Quell (2:21:29)

The 1987 Berlin Marathon was the 14th running of the annual marathon race held in Berlin, West Germany, held on 4 October. Tanzania's Suleiman Nyambui won the men's race in 2:11:11 hours, while the women's race was won by West Germany's Kerstin Preßler in 2:31:22. Gregor Golombek (1:46:52) and Margit Quell (2:21:29), both of West Germany, won the men's and women's wheelchair races. A total of 12,674 runners finished the race, comprising 11,651 men and 1023 women.

== Results ==
=== Men ===
Rank	Athlete	Nationality	Time
1st place, gold medalist(s)	Suleiman Nyambui	Tanzania	2:11:11
2nd place, silver medalist(s)	Rafael Marques	Portugal	2:13:23
3rd place, bronze medalist(s)	Japhet Mashishanga	Tanzania	2:13:27
4	John Vermeule	Netherlands	2:13:35
5	Peter Lyrenmann	Switzerland	2:13:40
6	Jean Weijts	Belgium	2:13:41
7	Mohammed Rutiginga	Tanzania	2:14:04
8	Richard Vollenbroek	Netherlands	2:14:08
9	Martin Grüning	West Germany	2:14:16
10	Kjeld Johnsen	Denmark	2:14:32
11	Peter Dall	Denmark	2:14:36
12	Mustapha Leghnider	Morocco	2:14:45
13	Tadeusz Lawicki	Poland	2:14:58
14	Andrzej Kaniak	Poland	2:15:10
15	Delfim Moreira	Portugal	2:15:20
16	Martin McCarthy	United Kingdom	2:15:33
17	Jozef Mitka	Poland	2:15:43
18	Ian Patten	United Kingdom	2:15:48
19	Sören Hellmark	Sweden	2:15:50
20	Eddy Hellebuyck	Belgium	2:16:07

=== Women ===
Rank	Athlete	Nationality	Time
1st place, gold medalist(s)	Kerstin Preßler	West Germany	2:31:22
2nd place, silver medalist(s)	Wanda Panfil	Poland	2:32:01
3rd place, bronze medalist(s)	Sissel Grottenberg	Norway	2:32:57
4	Cassandra Mihailovic	France	2:34:09
5	Magda Ilands	Belgium	2:34:23
6	Heather MacDuff	United Kingdom	2:36:22
7	Gabriela Gorzynska	Poland	2:38:17
8	Małgorzata Birbach	Poland	2:38:52
9	Rosmarie Müller	Switzerland	2:39:04
10	Krystyna Chylińska	Poland	2:39:22
11	Ailish Smyth	Ireland	2:39:36
12	Anna Iskra	Poland	2:39:38
13	Tove Lorentzen	Denmark	2:40:32
14	Ágnes Sipka	Hungary	2:40:33
15	Irina Hulanicka	Soviet Union	2:41:52
16	Vibeke Nielsen	Denmark	2:44:56
17	Maria Kawiorska	Poland	2:45:55
18	Ilona Zsilak	Hungary	2:46:50
19	Irena Czuta	Poland	2:47:00
20	Christiane Berethalmy	Austria	2:47:35
