= John Skovbjerg =

Danish marathon runner (born 1956)

Personal information
- Born: 22 January 1956 (age 70) Denmark

Sport
- Sport: Athletics
Medal record
Representing Denmark
Marathon
World Marathon Majors
Gold medal – first place	1984 Berlin	Marathon

John (Note: Some sources refer to him as Johan.) Skovbjerg (born 22 January 1956) is a Danish marathon runner, who won the 1984 Berlin Marathon, and came second at the 1985 and 1986 Vienna City Marathons.

== Career ==
Skovbjerg competed for Aarhus Gymnastikforening. He came 37th in the men's marathon event at the 1983 World Championships in Athletics.

Skovbjerg won the 1984 Berlin Marathon in a time of 2:13:25, after pulling away from West German Wolfgang Krüger in the final few kilometres of the race. He won the race by a few seconds, and his time was a course record, beating the previous record by two seconds. After the race, it was noticed that Skovbjerg had folded his race number, meaning that the sponsor could not be seen. As a result, he received a reduction in prize money; for a time, he had been threatened with disqualification.

In 1985, Skovbjerg came second at the Vienna City Marathon, and seventh at the 1985 Berlin Marathon. In 1986, he again came second at the Vienna City Marathon, and finished 12th in the 1986 Berlin Marathon.
