= 1994 Berlin Marathon =

21st Berlin Marathon
- Venue: Berlin, Germany
- Dates: 25 September 1994

Champions
- Men: António Pinto (2:08:31)
- Women: Katrin Dörre-Heinig (2:25:15)

The 1994 Berlin Marathon was the 21st running of the annual marathon race held in Berlin, Germany, held on 25 September 1994. Portugal's António Pinto won the men's race in 2:08:31 hours, while the women's race was won by home athlete Katrin Dörre-Heinig in 2:25:15.

== Results ==
=== Men ===
| Position | Athlete | Nationality | Time |
|---|---|---|---|
| 1 | António Pinto | Portugal | 2:08:31 |
| 2 | Sam Nyangincha | Kenya | 2:08:50 |
| 3 | Antonio Serrano | Spain | 2:09:13 |
| 4 | Lameck Aguta | Kenya | 2:10:41 |
| 5 | Bert van Vlaanderen | Netherlands | 2:10:49 |
| 6 | Jackson Kipngok | Kenya | 2:12:12 |
| 7 | Gilbert Rutto | Kenya | 2:12:36 |
| 8 | Juvenal Ribeiro | Portugal | 2:12:52 |
| 9 | Samson Maritim | Kenya | 2:12:59 |
| 10 | Mirosław Plawgo | Poland | 2:13:05 |

=== Women ===
| Position | Athlete | Nationality | Time |
|---|---|---|---|
| 1 | Katrin Dörre-Heinig | Germany | 2:25:15 |
| 2 | Rocío Ríos | Spain | 2:29:00 |
| 3 | Małgorzata Sobańska | Poland | 2:30:00 |
| 4 | Kirsi Mattila | Finland | 2:31:23 |
| 5 | Sonja Oberem | Germany | 2:31:35 |
| 6 | Aurica Buia | Romania | 2:33:16 |
| 7 | Elżbieta Jarosz | Poland | 2:33:28 |
| 8 | Olga Loginova | Russia | 2:33:58 |
| 9 | Krystyna Kuta | Poland | 2:35:24 |
| 10 | Cristina Costea | Romania | 2:35:45 |
