= Eva-Maria Gradwohl =

Austrian long-distance runner

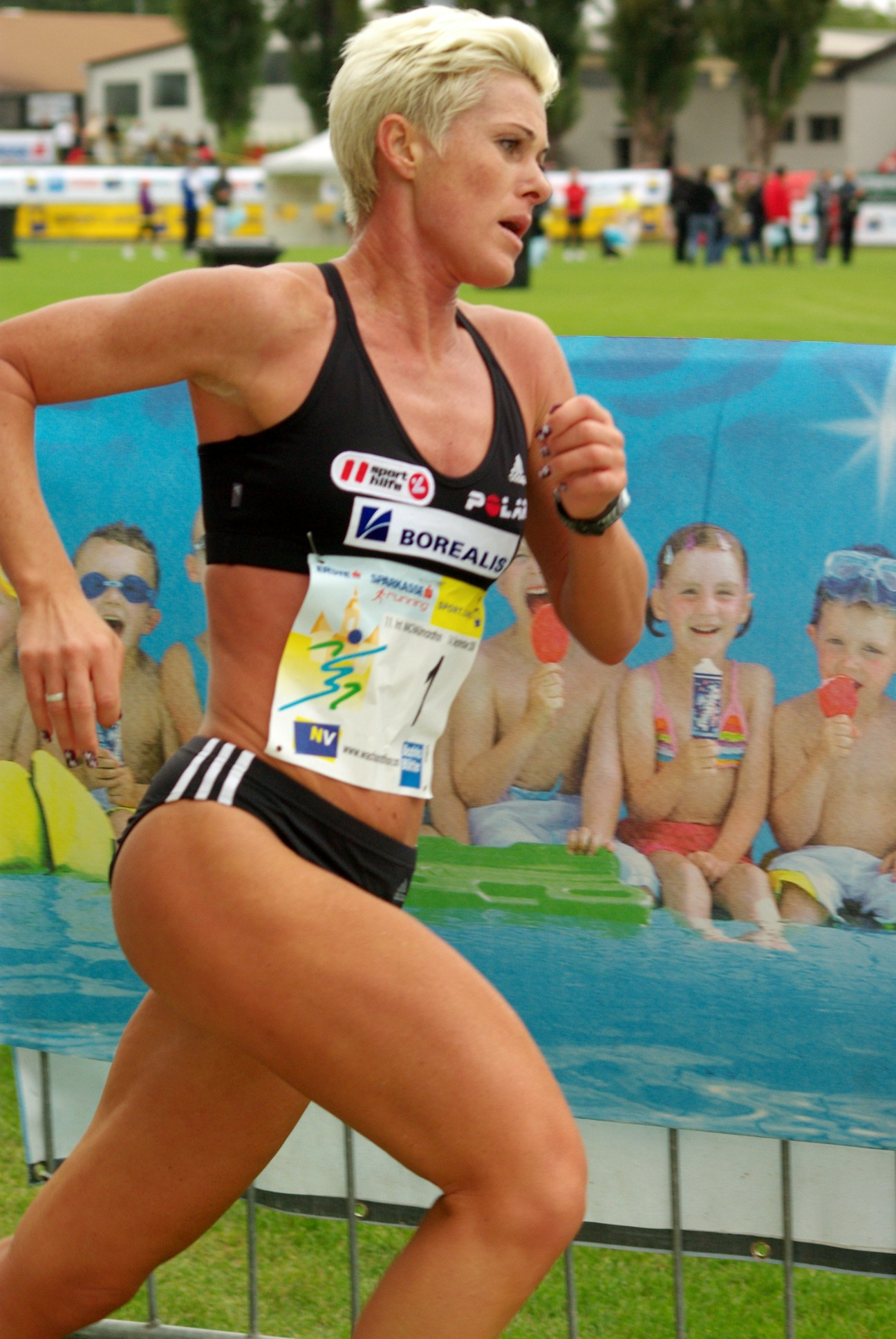
- Eva-Maria Gradwohl in the 2008 Wachau Marathon

Personal information
- Nationality: Austria
- Born: 29 March 1973 (age 53) Weiz, Austria
- Height: 1.68 m (5 ft 6 in)
- Weight: 57 kg (126 lb)

Sport
- Sport: Athletics
- Event: Marathon
- Club: SV ADA Happy Lauf Anger
- Coached by: Harald Bauer

Achievements and titles
- Personal best: 2:30:52

Eva-Maria Gradwohl (born March 29, 1973, in Weiz) is a retired Austrian long-distance and marathon runner. She is also four-time Austrian national champion in half-marathon, three-time in marathon, and two-time in 10-km road run. In 2010 Gradwohl retired from her sporting career, after refusing to take a doping test; according to NADA director Andreas Schwab, refusing to undergo a doping test was considered a positive test, and would be an obvious breach of the rules imposed in every sporting competition.

== Biography ==
Gradwohl started her sporting career as a cyclist, until she began long-distance running at the Vienna Marathon. In 2002, she won her first national championship title in the Wachau Marathon, with a time of 1:14:47 for the half-marathon race, in addition to her personal best of 1:13:25, and two other titles in Vienna for the following year. She had also won medals in numerous marathon races, including silver at the Stockholm Marathon in 2006, and gold at the Linz Marathon in 2008, beating her personal best time of 2:30:51. Gradwohl did not only set a national record for her best possible time, but also reached a qualifying standard time of 2:33:00, which made her eligible to compete at the 2008 Summer Olympics in Beijing.

At age thirty-five, Gradwohl made her official Olympic debut, and competed in the women's marathon. She ran and finished the race in fifty-seventh place, with a time of 2:44:24, just fourteen minutes behind her personal best set in Linz. In the following year, Gradwohl continued her winning streak at the Florence and Linz marathon.

== Doping scandal ==
On April 29, 2010, Gradwohl retired from her sporting career, after refusing to take a doping test, while on a vacation with her friends in Croatia. According to NADA director Andreas Schwab, refusing to undergo a doping test was considered a positive test, and would be an obvious breach of the rules imposed in every sporting competition. Gradwohl later admitted to the media reports that she was heavily involved in a personal relationship with former Nordic skiing coach Walter Mayer, who had been banned by the International Olympic Committee for a blood-doping scandal at the 2002 Winter Olympics in Salt Lake City, Utah, and also, for his alleged role in another doping scandal that rocked the Austrian national team at the 2006 Winter Olympics in Turin, Italy.
