= 1986 Berlin Marathon =

Racing event

13th Berlin Marathon
- Venue: Berlin, West Germany
- Date: 28 September

Champions
- Men: Bogusław Psujek (2:11:03)
- Women: Charlotte Teske (2:32:10)
- Wheelchair men: Heinz Frei (1:46:44)
- Wheelchair women: Connie Hansen (2:32:23)

The 1986 Berlin Marathon was the 13th running of the annual marathon race held in Berlin, West Germany, held on 28 September. Poland's Bogusław Psujek won the men's race in 2:11:03 hours, while the women's race was won by West Germany's Charlotte Teske in 2:32:10. Switzerland's Heinz Frei (1:46:44) and Denmark's Connie Hansen (2:32:23), won the men's and women's wheelchair races. A total of 11,450 runners finished the race, comprising 10,574 men and 876 women.

== Results ==
=== Men ===
Rank	Athlete	Nationality	Time
1st place, gold medalist(s)	Bogusław Psujek	Poland	2:11:03
2nd place, silver medalist(s)	Henrik Jørgensen	Denmark	2:11:49
3rd place, bronze medalist(s)	Gabriel Kamau	Kenya	2:12:35
4	Delfim Moreira	Portugal	2:12:39
5	Zbigniew Pierzynka	Poland	2:13:02
6	Pawel Lorens	Poland	2:13:05
7	Thomas Eickmann	West Germany	2:13:24
8	Eddy Hellebuyck	Belgium	2:13:45
9	Oddmund Roalkvam	Norway	2:13:53
10	Kingston Mills	Ireland	2:13:55
11	Jozef Machalek	Slovakia	2:13:57
12	Johan Skovbjerg	Denmark	2:14:48
13	Ryszard Misiewicz	Poland	2:14:56
14	Göran Högberg	Sweden	2:15:14
15	Zenon Poniatowski	Poland	2:15:32
16	Carlo Terzer	Italy	2:15:36
17	Martin Hafström	Sweden	2:16:04
18	Ronny Agten	Belgium	2:16:07
19	Stanimir Nenov	Bulgaria	2:16:41
20	Bjorn Sivertsen	Denmark	2:16:41

=== Women ===
Rank	Athlete	Nationality	Time
1st place, gold medalist(s)	Charlotte Teske	West Germany	2:32:10
2nd place, silver medalist(s)	Magda Ilands	Belgium	2:33:53
3rd place, bronze medalist(s)	Monika Schäfer	West Germany	2:34:05
4	Renata Kokowska	Poland	2:36:11
5	Maureen Hurst	United Kingdom	2:39:20
6	Irina Hulanicka	Soviet Union	2:39:37
7	Ursula Starke	West Germany	2:39:42
8	Ilona Zsilak	Hungary	2:40:49
9	Glynis Penny	United Kingdom	2:41:25
10	Eva Isaacs	Sweden	2:42:23
11	Anna Iskra	Poland	2:42:59
12	Stefania Kozik	Poland	2:45:52
13	Krystyna Chylińska	Poland	2:47:22
14	Barbara Paczos	Poland	2:47:29
15	Jutta Karsch	West Germany	2:47:52
16	Petra Liebertz	West Germany	2:48:09
17	Eva Petrik	Hungary	2:48:19
18	Vibeke Nielsen	Denmark	2:48:47
19	?	?	?
20	Brigitte Mühlisch	West Germany	2:50:49
