= Ian Ray =

British marathon runner

Personal information
- Nationality: British (English)
- Born: 28 August 1957 (age 68) Salisbury, England

Sport
- Sport: Athletics
- Event: long-distance
- Club: Salisbury AC
Medal record
Marathon
World Marathon Majors
Gold medal – first place	1981 Berlin	Marathon

Ian Ray (born 28 August 1957) is a British former marathon runner who won the 1981 Berlin Marathon.

== Biography ==
Ray was born in Salisbury, England. In 1979, Ray won the Southern Counties marathon championship in Harlow, in a time of 2:16:04. Ray won the 1981 Berlin Marathon in a time of 2:15:41. The top three in the race were all British, as were five of the top 10 finishers. The race was the first to be held in central West Berlin, and the finish line was in Kurfürstendamm near to the Kaiser Wilhelm Memorial Church. It was also the first Berlin Marathon with a cash prize for the winner. Ray was awarded 1000DM.

Ray was selected to represent England in the marathon event at the 1982 Commonwealth Games in Brisbane, Australia, after performing well at the AAA Championships. Ray came eighth in the race, in a time of 2:15:11. He was the second Englishman to finish, behind Mike Gratton.

He finished third behind Steve Kenyon in the marathon event at the 1982 AAA Championships and also competed at the 1983 London Marathon.
