= Philip Manyim =

Kenyan track and field athlete

Philip Manyim (born 24 March 1978) is a former Kenyan steeplechaser turned marathon runner. He was a pacesetter in steeplechase and competed in IAAF Grand Prix and IAAF Super Grand Prix events held from 2002 to 2004. He left steeplechase for marathon running in 2004, and won the 2005 Berlin Marathon with a time of 2:07:41. His other World Marathon Majors performances was an eighteenth place finish at the 2007 Boston Marathon and fourth place at the 2007 Berlin event. Manyim ended his running career at a 2010 marathon in Ljubljana, where he came in eighth place.

== Early life ==
Manyim was born on 24 March 1978 in Uasin Gishu County, Kenya.

== Career ==
Manyim started his sports career participating in road races, primarily throughout Italy, Kenya and the United States, from 1999 to 2004. During this time, he was a pacesetter and competitor in steeplechase. As a steeplechaser, he participated in multiple IAAF Grand Prix and IAAF Super Grand Prix events between 2002 and 2004. His best Grand Prix performance was a fifth place finish at Zagreb in 2003. Manyim also ran in IAAF Golden League meets while racing in the Grand Prixs, but did not finish any of his races.

After a 2004 steeplechase race in Switzerland, Manyim decided to switch from steeplechase to marathon. In a 2007 interview with Runners World, he said he went to marathon running because "a pacer does nothing but make a name for other people". After running in marathons held in Amsterdam, Rome, and Prague, he won the 2005 Berlin Marathon with a time of 2:07:41. In other World Marathon Majors, Manyim was eighteenth at the 2007 Boston Marathon and fourth at the 2007 Berlin event. His final race was at a 2010 marathon in Ljubljana where he had an eighth place finish.

== Personal life ==
Manyim is married and has two children.
