= Kazumi Matsuo =

Japanese long-distance runner

Kazumi Matsuo (松尾 和美, Matsuo Kazumi; born April 16, 1974 in Kobe) is a female marathon runner from Japan, who won the Nagoya Marathon on March 11, 2001, in a personal best time of 2:26:01 hours after having triumphed in the Berlin Marathon seven months earlier. She finished ninth at the 2001 World Championships in Athletics.

== Achievements ==
| Year | Competition | Venue | Position | Event | Notes |
Representing Japan
| 1999 | Hokkaido Marathon | Sapporo, Japan | 1st | Marathon | 2:32:14 |
| 2000 | Berlin Marathon | Berlin, Germany | 1st | Marathon | 2:26:15 |
| 2001 | Nagoya Marathon | Nagoya, Japan | 1st | Marathon | 2:26:01 |
| 2001 | World Championships | Edmonton, Canada | 9th | Marathon | 2:29:57 |
