= Sammy Lelei =

Kenyan long-distance runner

Sammy Lelei (born August 14, 1964) is a former long-distance runner from Kenya, who won the 1995 Berlin Marathon with a career best time of 2:07:02 hours. It was the fastest marathon time in 1995. This time stood as the Kenyan record for the event until 1998, when it was beaten by Ondoro Osoro.

In 1991 he competed in a high calibre one hour run contest and covered 19,820 m, while the winner Arturo Barrios set a world record. Lelei set his half marathon best of 1:01:36 hours en route to winning the 1992 Humarathon Half Marathon in France. In 1992 he won both the Peachtree Road Race and the Boilermaker Road Race. He was a two-time winner of the Cascade Run Off, having back-to-back wins in 1992 to 1993. He also won the Lisbon Half Marathon 1993 with a time of 59:24 minutes (although the course was short). His major marathon debut came at the 1993 Boston Marathon and his finishing time of 2:12:12 hours brought him fifth place overall. He ran in the New York City Marathon later that year and managed eighth. He came close to his personal best at the following year's New York race, coming fourth behind Arturo Barrios with a time of 2:12:24 hours.

Lelei took third place at the Paris Marathon in 1995, improving his best time to 2:11:11 hours. He ran at the 1996 Boston Marathon, finishing in 2:10:11 hours for fifth place. He focused more on marathon races in his late career. He returned to defend his title at the 1996 Berlin Marathon and reached the podium with a third-place finish and his second sub-2:10 clocking of 2:09:49 hours. He was third at the 1997 Berlin Marathon, recording a time of 2:08:00 hours,

His niece, Janet Cherobon-Bawcom, is also a marathon runner.

== Achievements ==
Year	Competition	Venue	Position	Event	Notes
Representing Kenya
1993	Lisbon Half Marathon	Lisbon, Portugal	1st	Half marathon	59.24
1993	Boston Marathon	Boston, United States	5th	Marathon	2:12:12
1993	New York City Marathon	New York City, United States	8th	Marathon	2:13:56
1994	New York City Marathon	New York City, United States	4th	Marathon	2:12:24
1995	Paris Marathon	Paris, France	3rd	Marathon	2:11:11
1995	Berlin Marathon	Berlin, Germany	1st	Marathon	2:07:02
1996	Boston Marathon	Boston, United States	5th	Marathon	2:10:11
1996	Berlin Marathon	Berlin, Germany	3rd	Marathon	2:09:49
1997	Berlin Marathon	Berlin, Germany	3rd	Marathon	2:08:00
