= 1974 Berlin Marathon =

Annual Sports Event in Berlin

1st Berlin Marathon
- Venue: Berlin, West Germany
- Date: 13 October

Champions
- Men: Günter Hallas (2:44:53)
- Women: Jutta von Haase (3:22:01)

The 1974 Berlin Marathon, known as the Berlin Volksmarathon, was the first running of the annual marathon race held in Berlin, West Germany, held on 13 October. Two West Germans won the competitions, with Günter Hallas taking the men's race in 2:44:53 hours and Jutta von Haase finishing first among women with 3:22:01. A total of 244 runners finished the race, comprising 234 men and 10 women.

== Results ==
=== Men ===
Rank	Athlete	Nationality	Time
1st place, gold medalist(s)	Günter Hallas	West Germany	2:44:53
2nd place, silver medalist(s)	Rudolf Breuer	West Germany	2:46:43
3rd place, bronze medalist(s)	Günter Olbrich	West Germany	2:48:08
4	Dieter Daubermann	West Germany	2:48:40
5	Dietrich Sickert	West Germany	2:49:01
6	Clifford Lewitz	United States	2:49:42
7	Horst Zettlitz	West Germany	2:53:48
8	Herbert Pieritz	West Germany	2:54:27
9	Horst Heinze	West Germany	2:55:08
10	Helmut Lewrick	West Germany	2:56:05

=== Women ===
Rank	Athlete	Nationality	Time
1st place, gold medalist(s)	Jutta von Haase	West Germany	3:22:01
2nd place, silver medalist(s)	Elfriede Kayser	West Germany	4:03:50
3rd place, bronze medalist(s)	Hannelore Eder	West Germany	4:26:35
4	Astried Ziezold	West Germany	4:39:22
5	Doris Lange	West Germany	4:48:01
6	Dorothea Bier	West Germany	4:52:22
7	Marion Breitkreuz	West Germany	5:20:48
8	Lieselotte Steglich	West Germany	5:40:10
