= Ingo Sensburg =

German long-distance runner

Personal information
- Born: 27 January 1949 (age 77) Berlin, West Germany

Sport
- Sport: Track and field
Medal record
Representing West Germany
European Indoor Championships
Gold medal – first place	1976 Munich	3000 m
Bronze medal – third place	1970 Vienna	Medley relay

Ingo Sensburg (born 27 January 1949) is a German male former long-distance runner who competed for West Germany in track events and the marathon.

From Berlin and trained by Fred Behrnsen, he took his first international medal at the 1970 European Athletics Indoor Championships where he was part of the bronze medal-winning West German medley relay team. He returned to the competition six years later and became the 3000 metres champion on home turf in Munich.

He achieved the majority of success in road running. He took the first of his three victories at the Berlin Marathon in 1976 with a time 2:23:08 hours. He improved to 2:20:21 hours in winning the Essen Marathon later that year, then to 2:17:49 hours to top the podium in Porz the following April. Sensburg won the Berlin Marathon again in 1979 and had his fastest performance there (2:16:48) during his 1980 win. His record of three wins was finally bettered by Haile Gebrselassie, who completed four straight wins in 2009. Sensburg was runner-up at the Hamburg Marathon in 1981. The highlights of his later career were four straight wins at the Berlin Half Marathon from 1985 to 1988.

Sensburg competed very frequently during his career at a local level and in 2012 he estimated that he had won 166 Berlin championship titles. He continued running in his older years in the masters athlete categories. In the over-45s category he was world champion in the 10,000 metres in 1995 and in the 10K run in 1994.

== International competitions ==
Year	Competition	Venue	Position	Event	Notes
1970	European Indoor Championships	Vienna, Austria	3rd	Medley relay	6:19.6
1976	European Indoor Championships	Munich, West Germany	1st	3000 m	8:01.6

== See also ==
- List of European Athletics Indoor Championships medalists (men)
