= 1980 New York City Marathon =

Footrace held in New York City

- Date: 26 October
- Location: (United States) New York City, NY
- Event type: Marathon
- Distance: 42.195 km
- Edition: 11th
- Course records: 2:09.41 (1980 men); 2:25.41 (1980 women)
- Website: Official website

The 1980 New York City Marathon was the 11th edition of the New York City Marathon and took place in New York City on 26 October.

== Results ==
=== Men ===
Rank	Athlete	Country	Time
1st place, gold medalist(s)	Alberto Salazar	United States	2:09.41
2nd place, silver medalist(s)	Rodolfo Gómez	Mexico	2:10.13
3rd place, bronze medalist(s)	John Graham	Scotland	2:11.46,5
4	Jeff Wells	United States	2:11.59,4
5	Bill Rodgers	United States	2:13.20,3
6	Inge Simonsen	Norway	2:13.28,3
7	Trevor Wright	England	2:13.31,0
8	Ryszard Marczak	Poland	2:13.45,1
9	Dick Beardsley	United States	2:13.56,0
10	Frank Richardson	United States	2:14.27,8
11	Christopher Garforth	England	2:14.28,7
12	Ricardo Ortega	Spain	2:14.44,6
13	Øyvind Dahl	Norway	2:15.06,9
14	Michelangelo Arena	Italy	2:15.16,2
15	Emmanuel Ndiemandoi	Tanzania	2:15.46,3
16	Jaime White	United States	2:16.38,6
17	Ferenc Szekeres	Hungary	2:17.19,0
18	Kevin Mccarey	United States	2:17.20,7
19	Roy Kulikowski	United States	2:17.50,6
20	Norman Wilson	England	2:17.58,5
21	Jerome Drayton	Canada	2:17.58,8
22	Christopher Stewart	England	2:17.59,0
23	Herman Parmentier	Belgium	2:18.08,6
24	Rick Callison	United States	2:18.15,8
25	Esa Tikkanen	Finland	2:18.29,1

=== Women ===
Rank	Athlete	Country	Time
1st place, gold medalist(s)	Grete Waitz	Norway	2:25.41,3
2nd place, silver medalist(s)	Patti Catalano	United States	2:29.33,6
3rd place, bronze medalist(s)	Ingrid Kristiansen	Norway	2:34.24,9
4	Carol Gould	England	2:35.05,5
5	Gillian Horovitz	England	2:37.55,4
6	Laurie Binder	United States	2:38.09,3
7	Kiki Sweigart	United States	2:40.34,3
8	Oddrun Mosling	Norway	2:41.00,5
9	Gayle Olinekova	Canada	2:41.32,9
10	Jean Chodnicki	United States	2:43.33,8
11	Sonja Laxton	South Africa	2:43.48,1
12	Janice Arenz	United States	2:44.16,0
13	Donna Burge	United States	2:44.47,1
14	Leslie Watson	Scotland	2:45.39,2
15	Carol Cook	United States	2:46.09,9
16	Karlene Herrell	United States	2:47.23,2
17	Kathleen Horton	United States	2:48.08,8
18	Sissel Grottenberg	Norway	2:48.28,4
19	Iciar Martinez	Spain	2:49.01,7
20	Jean Kerr	United States	2:50.45
21	Vreni Forster	Switzerland	2:51.29,3
22	Katie Mcdonald	United States	2:53.39,2
