= 1979 New York City Marathon =

Footrace held in New York City

- Date: 21 October
- Location: (United States) New York City, NY
- Event type: Marathon
- Distance: 42.195 km
- Edition: 10th
- Course records: 2:10:09 (1976 men); 2:27:33 (1979 women)
- Website: Official website

The 1979 New York City Marathon was the 10th edition of the New York City Marathon and took place in New York City on 21 October.

== Results ==
=== Men ===
Rank	Athlete	Country	Time
1	Bill Rodgers	United States	2:11:42
2	Kirk Pfeffer	United States	2:13:09
3	Stephen Kenyon	United Kingdom	2:13:30
4	Ian Thompson	United Kingdom	2:13:43
5	Benji Durden	United States	2:13:49
6	Jukka Toivola	Finland	2:14:00
7	Frank Shorter	United States	2:16:15
8	Ron Tabb	United States	2:16:28
9	Jon Peter Anderson	United States	2:16:38
10	Oyvind Dahl	Norway	2:16:41

=== Women ===
Rank	Athlete	Country	Time
1	Grete Waitz	Norway	2:27:33
2	Gillian Adams	United Kingdom	2:38:33
3	Jacqueline Gareau	Canada	2:39:06
4	Patti Lyons	United States	2:40:19
5	Carol Gould	United Kingdom	2:42:21
6	Vreni Forster	Switzerland	2:43:14
7	Suzanne Petersen	United States	2:47:37
8	Sissel Grottenberg	Norway	2:47:50
9	Doreen Ennis	United States	2:48:09
10	Vivian Soderholm	United States	2:49:05
