= 1983 New York City Marathon =

Marathon held in New York City in 1983

- Date: 23 October
- Location: (United States) New York City, NY
- Event type: Marathon
- Distance: 42.195 km
- Edition: 14th
- Course records: 2:08:12 (1981 men); 2:25.28 (1981 women)
- Website: Official website

The 1983 New York City Marathon was the 14th edition of the New York City Marathon and took place in New York City on 23 October.

== Results ==
=== Men ===
Rank	Athlete	Country	Time
1st place, gold medalist(s)	Rod Dixon	New Zealand	2:08.59
2nd place, silver medalist(s)	Geoff Smith	England	2:09.08
3rd place, bronze medalist(s)	Ron Tabb	United States	2:10.46
4	John Tuttle	United States	2:10.51
5	John Graham	Scotland	2:10.57
6	Gidamis Shahanga	Tanzania	2:11.05
7	Rudy Chapa	United States	2:11.13
8	Domingo Tibaduiza	Colombia	2:11.21
9	Derek Froude	New Zealand	2:11.25
10	Jukka Toivola	Finland	2:11.35
11	David Gordon	United States	2:11.41
12	Pat Petersen	United States	2:12.06
13	Kirk Pfeffer	United States	2:12.20
14	Kevin Ryan	New Zealand	2:12.53
15	Santiago de la Parte	Spain	2:12.54
16	David Brian Long	England	2:12.57
17	Oyvind Dahl	Norway	2:13.20
18	Tony Sandoval	United States	2:13.21
19	Don Norman	United States	2:13.34
20	Douglas Avrit	United States	2:13.57
21	Dean Matthews	United States	2:14.17
22	Alex Kasich	United States	2:14.22
23	Terence Colton	England	2:14.39
24	Sal Vega	United States	2:14.48
25	Ricardo Ortega	Spain	2:15.04

=== Women ===
Rank	Athlete	Country	Time
1st place, gold medalist(s)	Grete Waitz	Norway	2:27.00
2nd place, silver medalist(s)	Laura Fogli	Italy	2:31.49
3rd place, bronze medalist(s)	Priscilla Welch	England	2:32.31
4	Alba Milana	Italy	2:34.57
5	Nancy Ditz	United States	2:35.31
6	Christa Vahlensieck	West Germany	2:35.59
7	Veronique Marot	England	2:36.24
8	Paola Moro	Italy	2:37.46
9	Isabelle Carmichael	United States	2:38.15
10	Ann Peisch	United States	2:38.19
11	Maria Trujillo	Mexico	2:38.32
12	Julie Shea	United States	2:39.02
13	Carol Gould	England	2:40.34
14	Sarah Rowell	England	2:40.52
15	Gillian Horovitz	England	2:41.23
16	Heidi Jacobsen	Norway	2:41.25
17	Maria Luisa Ronquillo	Mexico	2:41.29
18	Renata Walendziak	Poland	2:41.34
19	Birgit Lennartz	West Germany	2:41.42
20	Jacqueline Hulbert	Wales	2:41.51
21	Kare Holm	United States	2:42.33
22	Inez Mclean	Scotland	2:42.42
23	Lone Dybdal	Denmark	2:42.45
24	Julie Barleycorn	England	2:42.57
25	Marilyn Hulak	United States	2:43.28

== Suptil ==
- Official website
