= Bill Squires =

American track and field coach (1932–2022)

- Born: William Squires; November 24, 1932
- Died: June 30, 2022 (aged 89)
- Education: University of Notre Dame
- Occupations: Track and Field coach

William Squires (November 24, 1932 – June 30, 2022) was an American track and field coach. He was well known for coaching the Greater Boston Track Club at the height of its marathon success, including marathoners Bill Rodgers, Alberto Salazar, Dick Beardsley, and Greg Meyer.

Squires was originally from Arlington, Massachusetts, and competed in track and field events for Arlington High School. While a senior there, Squires was chosen as a member of the 1952 Parade All-American team. Squires went on to college at Notre Dame, where he was a two-time All-American in cross-country in 1954 and 1955. Squires's personal bests according to the MSTCA hall-of-fame induction were 4:21 for the mile in high school and 4:07 in college. He was notable for designing a Heartbreak Hill simulator for training. He was formerly a coach at Boston State College from 1965 to 1978.

In 2002 Squires received the Bill Bowerman award from the National Distance Running Hall of Fame. Squires co-authored the book Speed with Endurance with Bruce Lehane.

Squires died on June 30, 2022, at the age of 89.
