= 1982 New York City Marathon =

Footrace held in New York City

- Date: 24 October
- Location: (United States) New York City, NY
- Event type: Marathon
- Distance: 42.195 km
- Edition: 13th
- Course records: 2:08:12 (1981 men); 2:25.28 (1981 women)
- Website: Official website

The 1982 New York City Marathon was the 13th edition of the New York City Marathon and took place in New York City on 24 October.

== Results ==
=== Men ===
Rank	Athlete	Country	Time
1st place, gold medalist(s)	Alberto Salazar	United States	2:09.29
2nd place, silver medalist(s)	Rodolfo Gómez	Mexico	2:09.33
3rd place, bronze medalist(s)	Dan Schlesinger	United States	2:11.54
4	Ryszard Marczak	Poland	2:12.44
5	David Murphy	England	2:12.48
6	Thomas Raunig	United States	2:13.22
7	George Malley	United States	2:13.29
8	José Gómez	Mexico	2:13.43
9	Martti Kiilholma	Finland	2:13.51
10	Dean Matthews	United States	2:14.00
11	Ralph Serna	United States	2:14.22
12	Ricardo Ortega	Spain	2:14.23
13	Ralf Salzmann	Germany	2:14.33
14	Armando Cendejas	United States	2:15.00
15	Kjell-Erik Ståhl	Sweden	2:15.02
16	Adrian Leek	Wales	2:15.56
17	Anatoliy Aryukov	Soviet Union	2:15.56
18	Benji Durden	United States	2:16.09
19	Michael Pinocci	United States	2:16.11
20	Oyvind Dahl	Norway	2:16.33
21	Michael Buhmann	United States	2:16.53
22	Don Norman	United States	2:16.56
23	Mervyn Brameld	England	2:17.11
24	Alessandro Rastello	Italy	2:17.15
25	Demetrio Cabanillas	Mexico	2:17.31

=== Women ===
Rank	Athlete	Country	Time
1st place, gold medalist(s)	Grete Waitz	Norway	2:27.14
2nd place, silver medalist(s)	Julie Brown	United States	2:28.33
3rd place, bronze medalist(s)	Charlotte Teske	Germany	2:31.53
4	Laura Fogli	Italy	2:33.01
5	Ingrid Kristiansen	Norway	2:33.36
6	Julie Isphording	United States	2:34.24
7	Laurie Binder	United States	2:35.18
8	Nadezhda Gumerova	Soviet Union	2:35.28
9	Carla Beurskens	Netherlands	2:35.37
10	Nancy Ditz	United States	2:38.08
11	Cynthia Hamilton	Canada	2:38.12
12	Marit Uglem	Norway	2:39.34
13	Iciar Martinez	Spain	2:42.36
14	Karolin Szabo	Hungary	2:42.43
15	Kitty Consolo	United States	2:42.46
16	Carol Gould	England	2:42.47
17	Zhanna Domoratskaya	Soviet Union	2:43.57
18	Laura Dewald	United States	2:43.57
19	Cindy Dalrymple	United States	2:44.15
20	Leslie Watson	Scotland	2:44.18
21	Ann Peisch	United States	2:44.32
22	Beverley Malan	South Africa	2:44.40
23	Isabelle Carmichael	United States	2:44.43
24	Sarah Quinn	United States	2:45.18
25	Cindy Wuss	United States	2:45.21
