= Bermuda Triangle Challenge =

Road running event in Bermuda

- Date: January
- Location: Bermuda
- Event type: Road
- Distance: Marathon, half marathon, 10K, mile
- Primary sponsor: Chubb Limited
- Established: 1975 (51 years ago) (marathon)
- Website: Official website
- Participants: Over 1,500 (2020)

The Bermuda Triangle Challenge (BTC) (also known as the Chubb Bermuda Triangle Challenge, and formerly known as the Bermuda Marathon Weekend) is a road race event held on the island of Bermuda. The marathon has been held since 1975, while the challenge was created in 2008. The three-day running challenge takes place throughout Bermuda and includes a mile run on Friday evening, either the 10K run or walk on Saturday morning, and either the half or full marathon on Sunday. (Note: With regards to our sponsors, the runs are entitled the Bank of Butterfield Front Street Mile, the BF&M 10k Run/Walk, the PwC Bermuda Half Marathon, and the PwC Bermuda Marathon.)

The event takes place in January, coinciding with the holiday weekend in honor of Martin Luther King Jr. observed in the United States.

Race participants include runners from over 25 countries. (Note: This includes runners from the United States, Canada, United Kingdom, Belgium, Netherlands, Switzerland, Germany, Ethiopia, Kenya, Singapore, and China.) Elite runners have included Olympic and World Champions and former world record holders such as Douglas Wakiihuri, Steve Jones, Steve Cram, Frank Shorter, Geoff Smith, Ron Hill, Tyler Butterfield, Paula Radcliffe, Kathrine Switzer and Grete Waitz.

The race is supported by a number of top sponsors including - Chubb Limited, PricewaterhouseCoopers, Bank of N.T. Butterfield, BF&M Insurance, Gosling Brothers, Bacardi Limited, Hamilton Princess, Zurich Insurance, Butterfield & Vallis, Strata-G Ltd & many others.

== History ==
The marathon was first held on 15 January 1975 as the Bermuda International Marathon. Seven runners participated, although only five finished the race. The marathon was not held again in 1976, but it returned in 1977.

In 1978, the 10K race was added. That same year, Joan Benoit Samuelson ran her first marathon here, after having won the inaugural 10K the previous day. She treated the marathon as a long workout, and ended up in second place with a time of 2:50:54.

In 1989, the mile race was added, and in 1993, the half marathon was also added.

== Courses ==
External image
- Course map of full marathon in 2020

The event features scenic courses along the coast and beaches of Bermuda and through historic sections of the island showcasing the island’s unique architecture. The point-to-point PricewaterhouseCoopers Bermuda Marathon course, which was redesigned in 2020, is IAAF certified and a Boston Marathon qualifier. The marathon course begins in Sandy's Parish at the Royal Navy Dockyard and travels through Ireland Island, Boaz Island around The Great Sound and continues along the Bermuda Railway trail and over the smallest drawbridge in the world, Somerset Bridge. The trail continues through Southampton Parish taking in the views of Gibb's Hill Lighthouse and the pink south shore beaches including Horseshoe Bay and Elbow Beach. The marathon course meets the half marathon course in Paget Parish and passes along the Bermuda Botanical Garden's and into Smith's Parish along Spittal Pond and Devil's Hole then continues into Flatt's Village along the North Shore Road by Government House and turns at Spanish Point and heads towards the City of Hamilton finishing at Hamilton Harbor.

== Winners and record holders ==
Andy Holden won the event marathon in a time of 2:15:20 in 1980. That time has not been bettered and is the event's longest standing record.

== Other activities ==
The event includes leading speakers such as Bart Yasso, Joan Benoit Samuelson, and Frank Shorter from the sports and health world and the BF&M 10k and PwC Half and Full Marathons culminate with a Finish Festival & Award Presentation Celebrations with live entertainment, free food and local adult refreshments. On Sunday, following the PwC events, the celebration takes place in Barr’s Bay Park overlooking Hamilton Harbor. Added to the festivities are bands, Gombey dancers, DJ’s and local celebrations along all the race courses.
