= Duel in the Sun =

Duel in the Sun may refer to:

- Duel in the Sun (film), a 1946 Western film directed by King Vidor
- Duel in the Sun (book), a book about Dick Beardsley, Alberto Salazar, and the 1982 Boston Marathon
- The 1977 Open Championship in golf, which saw an epic duel between Tom Watson and Jack Nicklaus
