= 1985 New York City Marathon =

Footrace held in New York City

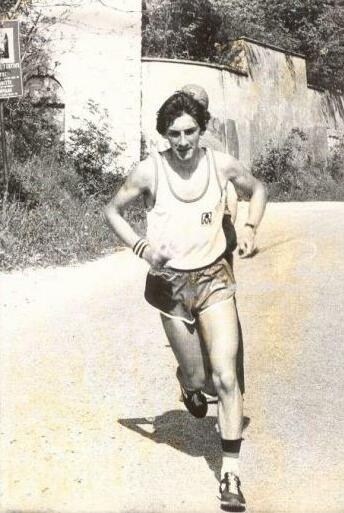
- Men's winner Orlando Pizzolato.
- Date: 27 October
- Location: (United States) New York City, NY
- Event type: Marathon
- Distance: 42.195 km
- Edition: 16th
- Course records: 2:08:12 (1981 men); 2:25:29 (1981 women)
- Website: Official website

The 1985 New York City Marathon was the 16th edition of the New York City Marathon and took place in New York City on 27 October.

== Results ==
=== Men ===
Rank	Athlete	Country	Time
1st place, gold medalist(s)	Orlando Pizzolato	Italy	2:11.34
2nd place, silver medalist(s)	Ahmed Salah	Djibouti	2:12.29
3rd place, bronze medalist(s)	Pat Petersen	United States	2:12.59
4	Don Norman	United States	2:14.08
5	Gerard Nijboer	Netherlands	2:14.27
6	Allan Zachariasen	Denmark	2:15.18
7	Bill Rodgers	United States	2:15.33
8	Giuseppe Pambianchi	Italy	2:15.40
9	Ibrahim Hussein	Kenya	2:15.55
10	Jorge Gonzalez	Puerto Rico	2:16.51
11	Grenville Wood	Australia	2:17.13
12	Jean-Yves Madelon	France	2:17.20
13	Julian Goater	England	2:17.33
14	Antoni Niemczak	Poland	2:17.48
15	Tommy Persson	Sweden	2:18.06
16	Nicholas Brawn	England	2:18.24
17	Ric Sayre	United States	2:18.34
18	Budd Coates	United States	2:18.45
19	Sam Ngatia	Kenya	2:19.29
20	Mohammed Rutiginga	Tanzania	2:19.55
21	Ed Swiatocha	United States	2:20.11
22	Thomas Downes	United States	2:20.15
23	Suleiman Nyambui	Tanzania	2:20.41
24	Isamu Sennai	Japan	2:21.10
25	Zoltan Koszegi	Hungary	2:21.23

=== Women ===
Rank	Athlete	Country	Time
1st place, gold medalist(s)	Grete Waitz	Norway	2:28.34
2nd place, silver medalist(s)	Lisa Ondieki	Australia	2:29.48
3rd place, bronze medalist(s)	Laura Fogli	Italy	2:31.36
4	Lorraine Moller	New Zealand	2:34.55
5	Priscilla Welch	England	2:35.30
6	Ngaire Drake	New Zealand	2:36.53
7	Susan King	United States	2:37.38
8	Julie Brown	United States	2:37.53
9	Jacqueline Gareau	Canada	2:38.31
10	Agnes Sipka	Hungary	2:40.22
11	Evy Palm	Sweden	2:40.50
12	Cristina Tomasini	Italy	2:41.08
13	Marianne Dickerson	United States	2:41.28
14	Michele Bush	United States	2:42.03
15	Magda Ilands	Belgium	2:42.34
16	Emma Scaunich	Italy	2:42.54
17	Beth Dillinger	United States	2:44.27
18	Grazyna Mierzejewska	Poland	2:44.28
19	Rita Marchisio	Italy	2:44.41
20	Katy Laetsch	United States	2:45.26
21	Marilyn Hulak	United States	2:47.01
22	Karen Cosgrove	United States	2:47.09
23	Lorna Irving	Scotland	2:47.52
24	Agnes Pardaens	Belgium	2:48.39
25	Caroll Myers	United States	2:50.03
