= L'eggs Mini-Marathon =

The L'eggs Mini-Marathon was a series of women only 10 kilometer (10K) road races held in the 1970s and 1980s, sponsored by the L'eggs hosiery company. The race grew from a small single event in 1972 into a national series with the sponsorship. The circuit consisted of three preliminary races, situated around the United States, in Dallas, Texas, Chicago, Illinois and San Diego, California leading to a big, nationally televised final race in New York City's Central Park, conducted by the New York Road Runners. Tens of thousands of women participated in the series which allowed them to rub shoulders most of the female running elite of the time, such as Grete Waitz, Rosa Mota and Priscilla Welch.

Women's only road races were virtually unheard of at that point in time. The event capitalized on three phenomenon of that era: Feminism, Title IX, and the Running boom of the 1970s. Many women, who had not previously thought of themselves as athletes achieved a feeling of self-empowerment by learning how to run, participating and completing the race. They felt comforted in the festive environment surrounded by other women of varying abilities. There was a unity in accomplishing this together with other women. For some, like Gerry Davidson and Gail Waesche Kislevitz, it was the only race they ran.

== Results ==
Year	Name	Nationality	Time	Entrants
1972	Jacqueline Dixon	United States	37:01.7	78
1973	Katherine Schrader	United States	36:48.7	103
1974	Doreen Ennis	United States	35:45.6	157
1975	Charlotte Lettis	United States	35:56.6	304
1976	Julie Shea	United States	35:04.8	492
1977	Peg Neppel	United States	34:115.3	2,277
1978	Martha White	United States	33:29.7	4,346
1979	Grete Waitz	Norway	31:15.4	5,807
1980	Grete Waitz	Norway	30:59.8 (World Record)	5,417

== Alumni ==
- Margaret Groos
- Ingrid Kristiansen
- Lisa Martin
- Rosa Mota
- Joan Benoit Samuelson
- Mary Decker Slaney
- Priscilla Welch
