= Bob Hall (wheelchair athlete) =

American wheelchair athlete (1951–2026)

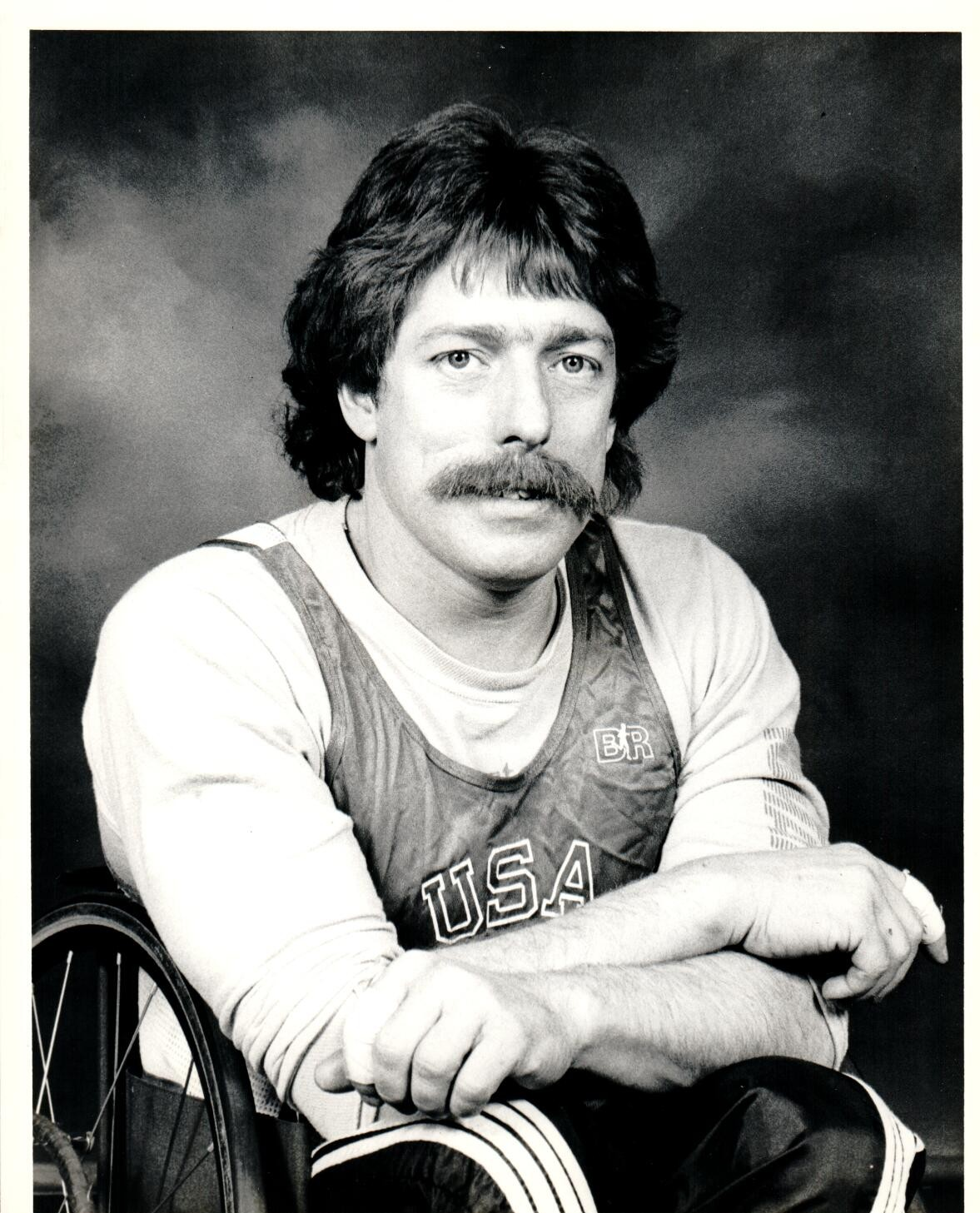
- Bob Hall in 1986
- Born: October 31, 1951; Cambridge, Massachusetts, U.S.
- Died: April 12, 2026 (aged 74); Cambridge, Massachusetts, U.S.
- Education: Boston State College
- Known for: 2 × Boston Marathon champion (1975, 1977)
- Sports career
- Height: 5 ft 3 in (1.60 m)
- Weight: 120 lb (54 kg)
- Country: USA
- Sport: Wheelchair racing
- Club: Greater Boston Track Club

Robert Joseph Hall (October 31, 1951 – April 12, 2026) was an American wheelchair racer and wheelchair designer. He competed in the 1975 Boston Marathon, for which he is recognized as the race's first official wheelchair champion. He also was the wheelchair champion of the 1977 Boston Marathon.

== Early life ==
Robert Joseph Hall was born on October 31, 1951, in Cambridge, Massachusetts. He contracted polio as a child, when he was 10 months old. Corrective surgery left his right ankle permanently fused. He graduated from Belmont High School in Belmont, Massachusetts, in 1970. Hall was a member of the class of 1974 at Boston State College.

While at Belmont High School, Hall was the manager (student assistant) for the basketball and football teams; his entry in his high school yearbook said he aspired to become a sportswriter.

Around 1970, a fellow athlete persuaded Hall to try wheelchair basketball, which led to him competing in wheelchair racing. According to articles from the 1970s, Hall was able to walk, albeit with difficulty, and used a wheelchair solely in competition. He qualified for a division meant for athletes with minimal handicaps. (Note: A 1974 article in The Boston Globe said that Hall was not confined to a wheelchair, but was "qualified to compete in wheelchair games in division five, for those with minimum handicap." In a 1976 article in the Globe, Hall was quoted as stating, "I've used crutches, but the only time I've ever used a wheelchair has been to compete." A 1979 article in The Spokesman-Review said, "He is not confined to his chair, but he's been rebuilt from his right hip down so he can walk — with difficulty.")

== Racing career ==
In 1974, Hall placed first in the National Wheelchair Mile and National Wheelchair Marathon, and also won the Toledo Marathon in Ohio.

Following his marathon victory in Toledo, Hall sought permission from the Boston Athletic Association (BAA) to compete in the Boston Marathon. Hall was granted permission to enter under official conditions. He was informed that if he completed the course in under three and a half hours, (Note: Some sources state that Hall needed to complete the course in three hours.) he would receive an official BAA finisher’s certificate. Hall successfully completed the 1975 Boston Marathon, held on April 21, in 2 hours and 58 minutes, earning official recognition. (Note: In the 1970 Boston Marathon, a disabled veteran in a wheelchair, Eugene Roberts, began before the official noon start of the race and went on to complete the course in approximately seven hours. Roberts is not recognized as a Boston Marathon champion.)

Hall's performance played a key role in convincing the BAA to formally recognize wheelchair racing as an official division of the event. The Boston Marathon subsequently became the first major international marathon to allow wheelchair competitors, which was a catalyst for marathons around the world to add a wheelchair division. Hall was the wheelchair champion of the 1977 Boston Marathon, with a then-world record of 2:40:10.

In 1976, Hall requested entry to the New York City Marathon, but was refused. In 1978, Hall filed a discrimination lawsuit against the New York Road Runners (NYRR), who then allowed him to partake in the 1978 and 1979 events. In 1982, after NYRR appealed the suit, the court ruled in favor of NYRR. However, the Mayor of New York City, Ed Koch, intervened and threatened to cancel the race if wheelchair athletes were not allowed to participate.

In 1980, Hall completed a wheelchair trek from Florida to Boston alongside American road racer Dave McGillivray to raise money for The Jimmy Fund. The East Coast Run took 38 days over a distance of 1,520 miles (2,450 km), ending at the Boston Marathon finish line, and included photo ops with the Boston Red Sox and President Jimmy Carter.

In 2002, Hall appeared on the list of Boston magazine's Top 40 Favorite Bostonians, preceded only by Errol Morris and Tom Brady.

== Wheelchair design ==
In 1978, Hall founded Hall's Wheels, a company that designed and produced lightweight, custom-built racing wheelchairs. Hall's innovations significantly improved the performance of racing wheelchairs, making them lighter and more aerodynamic.

== Death ==
Hall died from complications of pneumonia on April 12, 2026, at the age of 74. He had been under hospice care at Mount Auburn Hospital in Cambridge at the time of his death.

== Recognition ==
In 1996, Hall participated in the unveiling of a monument in Copley Square, in Boston, celebrating the 100th anniversary of the Boston Marathon. Hall was joined by several fellow champions, including Johnny Kelley, Greg Meyer, and the race's first female participant and women's champion, Bobbi Gibb.

In 2025, Hall was honored by the BAA on the 50th anniversary of his historic Boston Marathon race. He was named Grand Marshal of the 129th Boston Marathon, alongside fellow 1975 champion Bill Rodgers.

== Awards and distinctions ==
- 1974 National Wheelchair Mile (6:51) 1st (NR)
- 1974 Toledo Ohio Marathon 1st
- 1975 Boston Marathon (2:58:00) 1st (CR)
- 1977 Boston Marathon (2:40:10) 1st (WR)
- 1980 Boston Marathon 3rd
- 1981 Boston Marathon 3rd
- 1991 Adaptive Sports Hall Of Fame inductee
- 2025 Rick and Dick Hoyt Award
- 2025 Boston Marathon grand marshal with Bill Rodgers
- 2025 UMass Boston Athletics Hall of Fame (Note: Hall's alma mater, Boston State College, was merged into the University of Massachusetts Boston in 1982.)
