= John Brant =

John Brant may refer to:

- John Brant (Mohawk leader) (1794–1832), son of Joseph Brant
- John Brant (author), writes on the subject of software architecture
- John Brant (sportswriter), author of Duel in the Sun
- Jon Brant (born 1955), American bass player
