= Ngaire Drake =

New Zealand marathon runner

Personal information
- Born: 11 May 1949 (age 77) New Zealand

Sport
- Sport: Athletics
Medal record
Marathon
Major marathons
Silver medal – second place	1981 London	Marathon
Bronze medal – third place	1986 Nagoya	Marathon
Bronze medal – third place	1986 Tokyo	Marathon

Ngaire Drake (born 11 May 1949) is a New Zealand former marathon runner, who came second at the 1981 London Marathon, and sixth at the 1985 New York City Marathon. She has also won the Hamilton, Canberra and Sydney Marathons, and the 1984 Avon International Marathon in Paris. She competed in the marathon event at the 1983 World Championships in Athletics.

== Career ==
In 1981, Drake came second at the inaugural London Marathon. In 1982, she won the Hamilton Marathon. She competed in the marathon event at the 1983 World Championships in Athletics, finishing 24th. That year, she also won the Canberra Marathon, in a time of 2:44:11. She came seventh at the 1984 Avon International Marathon in Paris. Drake won the Wang Australia marathon in Sydney, Australia in 1984 and 1985. She won the 1985 event by over two minutes, and was the first person to win the event twice. She came sixth at the 1985 New York City Marathon, and also came sixth in a 10 km race in San Diego, US.

In 1986, Drake came third at the Nagoya International Women's Marathon, in a time of 2:38:46. Drake won the 1986 Sydney Marathon in a time of 2:38:52, and came third at the Tokyo International Women's Marathon in a time of 2:38:08. The same year, she won the Westfield Marathon for the third successive year. In 1987, she won the Wellington Half-Marathon in a time of 1:15, In 1988, she won the Australian Marathon Championships as a guest runner. In 1989, she won the over-40s event at the Twin Cities Marathon, in a time of 2:41:25. She finished ninth overall.
