= 1981 London Marathon =

1st London Marathon

1st London Marathon
- Venue: London, United Kingdom
- Date: 29 March 1981

Champions
- Men: Dick Beardsley & Inge Simonsen (2:11:48)
- Women: Joyce Smith (2:29:57)

The 1981 London Marathon was the first running of the annual marathon race in London, United Kingdom, which took place on Sunday, 29 March. The elite men's race was won in a time of 2:11:48 hours by two athletes, American Dick Beardsley and Inge Simonsen of Norway, who crossed the finish line holding hands. The women's race was won by Britain's Joyce Smith in 2:29:57.

Around 20,000 people applied to enter the race, of which 7747 had their applications accepted and around 7055 started the race. A total of 6255 runners finished the race.

== Results ==
=== Men ===
Position	Athlete	Nationality	Time
1st place, gold medalist(s)	Dick Beardsley	United States	2:11:48
1st place, gold medalist(s)	Inge Simonsen	Norway	2:11:48
3rd place, bronze medalist(s)	Trevor Wright	United Kingdom	2:12:53
4	Mike Kearns	United Kingdom	2:13:37
5	Graham Laing	United Kingdom	2:13:59
6	Brian Cole	United Kingdom	2:14:01
7	James Dingwall	United Kingdom	2:14:54
8	Keith Penny	United Kingdom	2:15:31
9	Paul Eales	United Kingdom	2:15:55
10	Don Faircloth	United Kingdom	2:16:36

=== Women ===
Position	Athlete	Nationality	Time
1st place, gold medalist(s)	Joyce Smith	United Kingdom	2:29:57
2nd place, silver medalist(s)	Gillian Drake	New Zealand	2:37:12
3rd place, bronze medalist(s)	Horovitz	United Kingdom	2:40:44
4	Kathy Molitor	United States	2:42:26
5	Sally Strauss	United States	2:42:42
6	Karen Holdsworth	United Kingdom	2:43:28
7	Suzan Morris	United Kingdom	2:43:28
8	Julie Barleycorn	United Kingdom	2:45:33
9	Véronique Marot	France	2:46:51
10	Margaret Lockley	United Kingdom	2:47:29
11	Leslie Watson	United Kingdom	2:48:06
