= Ron Tabb =

American long-distance runner (born 1954)

Ron Tabb (born August 7, 1954) is a retired male long-distance runner from the United States, who competed in the late 1970s and early 1980s in the men's marathon. He won the 1981 edition of the Paris Marathon ex-æquo with England's Dave Cannon. He won the 1983 Beijing Marathon and competed at the 1983 World Championships in Athletics later that year, finishing in 18th place overall. He qualified for the 1980 Olympic team but never competed due to the U.S. boycott on the Moscow Games that year. He once held the fifth fastest marathon time ever run by an American. Tabb is a four time United States Olympic trials qualifier. He is one of only four Americans to run more than 20 marathons under 2:20 and he is one of two Americans to a win major marathon on five different continents.

From 1981 through 1983 he was married to and coached Mary Decker. While overseeing Decker's training Mary set several world records both indoors and outdoors. Among the many records she set were the 1 mile, 3,000, 5,000, and 10,000. Decker remains the only athlete to ever accomplish this feat male or female.

Born and raised in Lexington, Missouri. Tabb began running track in the spring of his junior year. He immediately found success running the two mile where he set the L.H.S. school record which still stands as of 2020. Tabb's success earned him an athletic scholarship to Central Missouri State University.

At Central Missouri, Tabb broke every school record from the mile to 10,000 meters and he was a four time NCAA All American. After college, in 1977 Tabb set his sights on qualifying for the 1980 United States Olympic marathon trials and in January 1978 he won his first major marathon in Houston (2:17:11) setting a Texas state record and qualifying for the United States Olympic trials.

In January 1980, Tabb again won the Houston Marathon (2:13:35) re-setting the mark he established in 1978, then in February he won the Mardi Gras Marathon in New Orleans (2:11:00) setting a Louisiana state marathon record which continues to stand in 2020. In April Tabb finished 3rd at the Boston Marathon (2:14:48), and in May Tabb went on to finish 4th at the Olympic Marathon (2:12:39) trails.

In 1983 Tabb who had been self coached since 1977 began training under the legendary University of Oregon coach Bill Dellinger. Dellinger once coached the great Steve Prefontaine and he was coaching Alberto Salazar the current world record holder in the marathon. Under Dellinger's guidance Tabb became the fifth fastest marathon runner in United States history by finishing 2nd at the 1983 Boston Marathon (2:09:31). Entering 1984 Tabb was a favorite to win a medal in the Olympic Marathon but a series of injuries derailed his hopes. "

== Meb Keflezighi influenced by Ron Tabb ==
After former U.S. marathon star Ron Tabb watched Meb training one afternoon in San Diego, Tabb told Meb that he would make a great marathoner some day. Meb thought Tabb was crazy. And the 26.2-mile distance too.

Meb is "The only athlete in history to win the Boston Marathon, the New York City Marathon & an Olympic medal"

== Fort Myers names former top marathoner Ron Tabb new girls cross country coach ==
"A winner of 10 marathons in a career that ended in 1992, Tabb posted top-10 finishes in the Boston and New York Marathons while winning the Paris and Beijing marathons.

Upon retiring as a professional runner, Tabb took his running experience and began coaching at the college level. His first coaching job was at Cuyamaca Community College in El Cajon, CA. where in 1993 he coached his men's team to a California Cross Country State Championship and was named California Community Coach of the year. His men's team was the number one ranked Community College team in the nation. It was during this time when he began coaching a high school student/athlete named Meb Keflezighi. Under Tabb's guidance Keflezighi led the nation in four events, 1600, 1 mile, 3200, and 2 mile. Keflezighi would follow Tabb's footsteps becoming a marathon runner and become the first United States Olympic marathon medalist since Frank Shorter in 1976 winning the silver medal in 2004 in Athens, Greece. Keflezighi would represent the United States in four Olympic games and win both the Boston and New York City Marathons.

Tabb was also the head men's and women's Head Cross Country and Track Coach at NCAA D-III Pacific University in Forest Grove, Oregon where coached dozens of NCAA National qualifiers and several NCAA All-Americans.

== Achievements ==
- 1983 Boston Marathon 2:09:31 2nd. 5th fastest marathon in U.S. history
- 1983 N.Y. City Marathon 2:10:48 3rd. 1st American
- 1983 Wang Australian Marathon..2:10:53 1st 2nd fastest marathon on Australian continent.
- 1980 Mardi Gras Marathon (New Orleans) 2:11:00 1st Louisiana state record.
- 1981 Paris Marathon Paris, France..2:11:44 1st fastest marathon on French soil.
- 1980 U.S. Olympic trials 2:12:39 4th 1st alternate United States Olympic Team
- 1980 Houston Marathon 2:13:35..1st..Texas state record
- 1983 World Championships 2:13:38..Helsinki, Finland 18th. Best time by an American at World Championships until 2007.
- 1980 Boston Marathon 2:14:48..3rd..2nd American
- 1982 Nike OTC Marathon..2:15:30 15th. Eugene, Oregon.
- 1985 Rio Marathon..2:16:16..1st.
- 1978 St. Louis Marathon 2:16:35..1st..Missouri state record.
- 1979 N.Y. City Marathon 2:16:28 8th.
- 1981 Toronto Marathon 2:16:48..2nd.
- 1978 Houston Marathon..2:17:11..1st..Texas state record
- 1979 Montreal Marathon 2:17:14..10th..1st American
- 1985 Big "M" Marathon 2:17:45..4th..1st American
- 1979 Honolulu Marathon 2:17:58..3rd
- 1983 Beijing Marathon 2:18:51..1st..
- 1985 New Jersey Waterfront Marathon 2:19:11..4th
- 1988 Houston Marathon 2:19:38..17th
- 1979 Boston Marathon 2:19:41..51st.

Year	Competition	Venue	Position	Event	Notes
Representing the United States
1981	Paris Marathon	Paris, France	1st	Marathon	2:11:44
1983	Boston Marathon	Boston, United States	2nd	Marathon	2:09:31
1983	Beijing Marathon	Beijing, PR China	1st	Marathon	2:18:51
1983	World Championships	Helsinki, Finland	18th	Marathon	2:13:38
