= Frank Richardson (runner) =

American retired marathon runner

Frank Richardson (born February 26, 1955) is an American retired marathon runner who competed during the 1970s and 1980s. Before entering his first races in the late 1970s, Richardson was 4th at the 1976 NCAA Men's Division III Cross Country Championship and 1st at the 1977 NCAA Division III Men's Outdoor Track and Field Championships in the 10,000 meters. In World Marathon Majors, Richardson was 20th at the 1979 Boston Marathon and did not complete the 1980 Boston event. That year, Richardson won the 1980 Chicago Marathon with a course record time of 2:15:15 and was 10th at the 1980 New York City Marathon. In other events, Richardson won the 1980 USA Marathon Championships and was 9th in the marathon at the 1980 United States Olympic Trials. After ending his marathon career in 1985, Richardson worked at a pharmacy before resuming road racing in 2001.

== Early life and education ==
On February 26, 1955, Richardson was born in Sac City, Iowa. Growing up, Richardson played multiple sports before becoming a runner in his teens. In 1973, Richardson was injured in a car accident and sustained a vertebral compression fracture months before he was to start an athletic scholarship at Drake University. Following his injury, Richardson was advised not to do any running for half a year.

For his post-secondary education, Richardson initially studied physics at the Massachusetts Institute of Technology before switching to life sciences. After completing his MIT program, Richardson went to Iowa State University in the late 1970s for veterinary medicine. While at Iowa State, Richardson went to San Francisco for his veterinary training. For additional education, Richardson completed a degree specializing in experimental pathology.

== Career ==
While at MIT in 1976, Richardson was 4th at the NCAA Men's Division III Cross Country Championship and won the IC4A college cross country championship. At the 1977 NCAA Division III Men's Outdoor Track and Field Championships, Richardson won the 10,000 meters with a time of 29:50:92. That same year, Richardson began his road running career in mid 1977. Between 1978 and 1985, Richardson primarily competed in American races ranging from the 10 kilometers and marathon.

During this time period, Richardson was 20th at the 1979 Boston Marathon and won the 1980 USA Marathon Championships. After the championship, it was determined that Richardson and the other competitors had not run the entire race after they were accidentally directed to a road not part of the marathon. With a time of 2:13:54, Richardson qualified for the Boston Marathon and United States Olympic Trials to be held in 1980. That year, Richardson did not complete the Boston Marathon and was 9th in the marathon during the 1980 United States Olympic Trials.

In June 1980, Richardson won the Manitoba Marathon with a time of 2:15:15. At Manitoba, Richardson and two other competitors were temporally delayed from finishing the race due to a railway train. Months later, Richardson won the 1980 Chicago Marathon with a new course record time of 2:14:04. Later that year, Richardson finished in 10th at the 1980 New York City Marathon. After competing in the 1981 Nike OTC Marathon, Richardson received a three-month suspension from The Athletics Congress for running in a professional event as an amateur athlete. Throughout the 1980s, Richardson continued to run in marathons until 1985.

== Post-career ==
After ending his marathon career, Richardson worked at a pharmacy before he reappeared at road racing events in 2001. Richardson is married and has three kids.
