= 1988 New York City Marathon =

Footrace held in New York City

19th New York City Marathon
- Venue: New York City, New York
- Date: November 6

Champions
- Men: Steve Jones (2:08:20)
- Women: Grete Waitz (2:28:07)

The 1988 New York City Marathon was the 19th running of the annual marathon race in New York City, New York, which took place on Sunday, November 6. The men's elite race was won by Great Britain's Steve Jones in a time of 2:08:20 hours while the women's race was won by Norway's Grete Waitz in 2:28:07.

A total of 22,405 runners finished the race, 18,431 men and 3974 women.

== Results ==
=== Men ===
Position	Athlete	Nationality	Time
1st place, gold medalist(s)	Steve Jones	United Kingdom	2:08:20
2nd place, silver medalist(s)	Salvatore Bettiol	Italy	2:11:41
3rd place, bronze medalist(s)	John Treacy	Ireland	2:13:18
4	Gidamis Shahanga	Tanzania	2:13:50
5	Juan-Carlos Montero	Spain	2:14:00
6	Nikolay Tabak	Soviet Union	2:14:06
7	Kazuyoshi Kudo	Japan	2:14:14
8	Mark Nenow	United States	2:14:21
9	Dereje Nedi	Ethiopia	2:14:27
10	Rustam Shagiev	Soviet Union	2:14:34
11	Pierre Lévisse	France	2:14:38
12	Wodajo Bulti	Ethiopia	2:14:43
13	Salvatore Nicosia	Italy	2:14:58
14	Geoffrey Wightman	United Kingdom	2:15:40
15	John Vermeule	Netherlands	2:15:54
16	Ryszard Marczak	Poland	2:15:54
17	Antoni Niemczak	Poland	2:15:54
18	Yuri Porotov	Soviet Union	2:15:56
19	Metaferia Zeleke	Ethiopia	2:16:14
20	Carlo Terzer	Italy	2:17:40

=== Women ===
Position	Athlete	Nationality	Time
1st place, gold medalist(s)	Grete Waitz	Norway	2:28:07
2nd place, silver medalist(s)	Laura Fogli	Italy	2:31:26
3rd place, bronze medalist(s)	Joan Samuelson	United States	2:32:40
4	Karolina Szabó	Hungary	2:36:40
5	Kerstin Preßler	West Germany	2:37:35
6	Alevtina Naumova	Soviet Union	2:37:59
7	Graziella Striuli	Italy	2:39:32
8	Hazel Stewart	New Zealand	2:40:26
9	Bente Moe	Norway	2:40:41
10	Tove Lorentzen	Denmark	2:41:07
11	Ľudmila Melicherová	Czechoslovakia	2:41:43
12	Ágnes Sipka	Hungary	2:42:03
13	Gillian Horovitz	United Kingdom	2:42:18
14	Ritva Lemettinen	Finland	2:42:19
15	Irina Petrova	Soviet Union	2:42:20
16	Czeslawa Mentlewicz	Poland	2:42:38
17	Gillian Beschloss	United Kingdom	2:43:10
18	Ewa Szydlowska	Poland	2:44:47
19	Marie Boyd	United States	2:45:20
20	Gail Scott	United States	2:47:33
