= 1980 Chicago Marathon =

Footrace held in Chicago, Illinois

4th Chicago Marathon
- Venue: Chicago, United States
- Dates: September 28

Champions
- Men: Frank Richardson (2:14:04)
- Women: Sue Petersen (2:45:03)

The 1980 Chicago Marathon was the fourth running of the annual marathon race in Chicago, United States and was held on September 28. The elite men's and women's races were won by Americans Frank Richardson (2:14:04 hours) and Sue Petersen (2:45:03). A total of 3624 runners finished the race, an increase of over 750 from the previous year.

== Results ==
=== Men ===
Position	Athlete	Nationality	Time
1st place, gold medalist(s)	Frank Richardson	United States	2:14:04
2nd place, silver medalist(s)	Chuck Smead	United States	2:16:47
3rd place, bronze medalist(s)	Joseph Sheeran	United States	2:19:12
4	Duane Spitz	United States	2:19:55
5	Gordon Minty	United States	2:21:24
6	John Wellerding	United States	2:21:37
7	Jim Macnider	United States	2:22:07
8	Kurt Shallenberger	United States	2:22:52
9	Frank Shorter	United States	2:23:38
10	Veli Bali	Turkey	2:24:07

=== Women ===
Position	Athlete	Nationality	Time
1st place, gold medalist(s)	Sue Petersen	United States	2:45:03
2nd place, silver medalist(s)	Susan Henderson	United States	2:49:43
3rd place, bronze medalist(s)	Marilyn Bevans	United States	3:00:43
4	Bonnie Payne	United States	3:01:00
5	Diane Sims Page	United States	3:01:00
6	Melissa Uchitelle	United States	3:05:39
7	Helen Dick	United States	3:08:48
8	Ada Letinsky	Canada	3:10:58
9	Maryanne Joyce	United States	3:12:45
10	Matilee Christman	United States	3:14:11
