= 1975 Boston Marathon =

Footrace in Boston, Massachusetts, USA

- Venue: Boston, Massachusetts, U.S.
- Date: April 21, 1975
- Competitors: 2,041

Champions
- Men: Bill Rodgers (2:09:55)
- Women: Liane Winter (2:42:24)
- Wheelchair men: Bob Hall (2:58:00)

The 1975 Boston Marathon took place on Monday, April 21, 1975. It was the 79th time the Boston Marathon was organized. Of the field of 2,041 competitors, 1,838 completed the race; 1,810 men and 28 women.

The men's race was won by American Bill Rodgers in 2:09:55, setting a new course record. At the time, Rodgers was a graduate student at Boston College; he later won the 1978, 1979, and 1980 editions of the race. The women's race was won by Liane Winter of West Germany in a world-record time of 2:42:24.

Bob Hall became the first recognized wheelchair champion of the Boston Marathon, finishing in two hours and 58 minutes. (Note: In the 1970 Boston Marathon, a disabled veteran in a wheelchair, Eugene Roberts, began before the official noon start of the race and went on to complete the course in approximately seven hours.)

== Results ==
=== Men ===
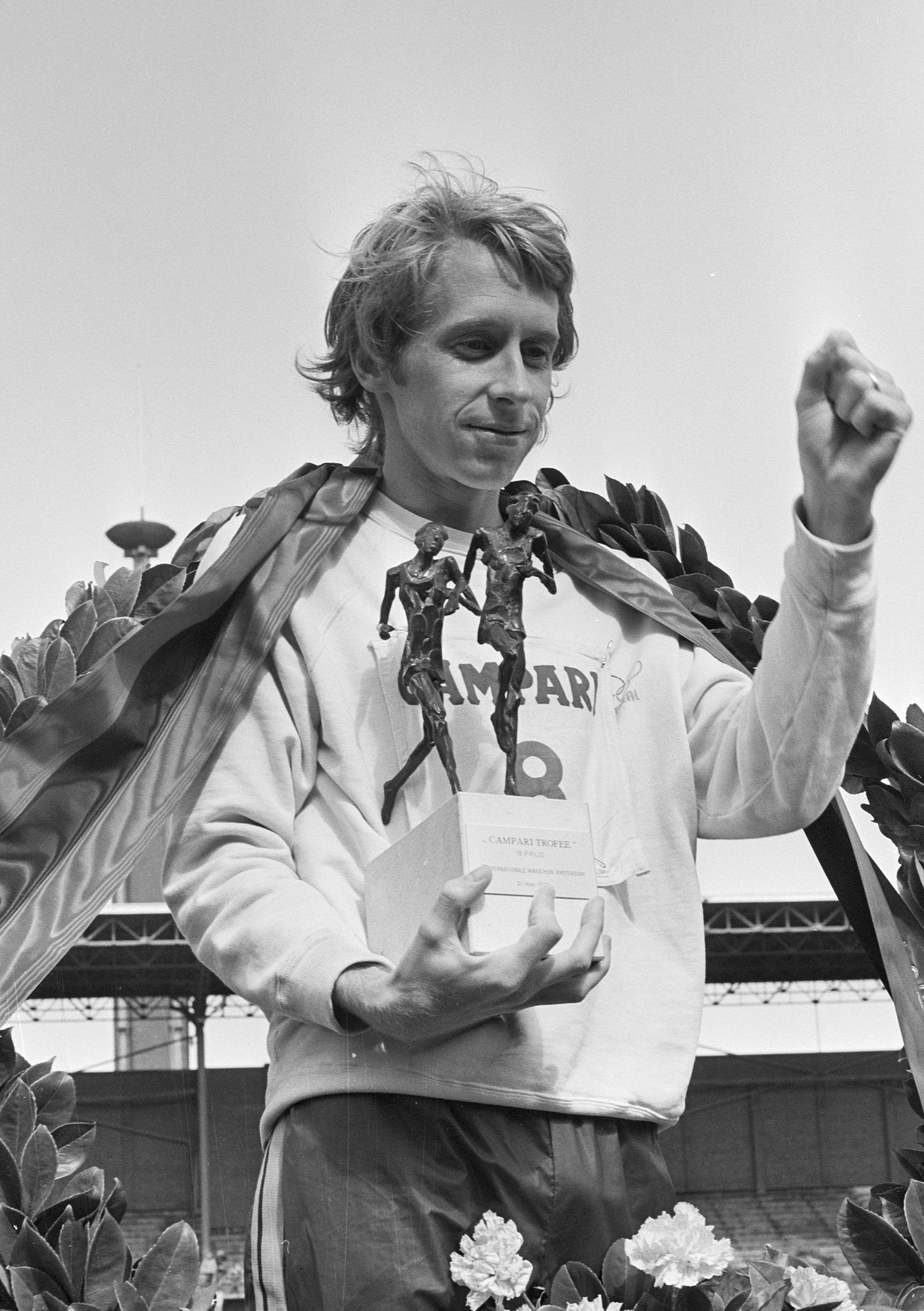
Bill Rodgers in 1977

Position	Athlete	Nationality	Time
1	Bill Rodgers	United States	2:09:55
2	Steve Hoag	United States	2:11:54
3	Tom Fleming	United States	2:12:05
4	Thomas Howard	Canada	2:13:23
5	Ron Hill	United Kingdom	2:13:28
6	James Stanley	United States	2:14:54
7	Russell Pate	United States	2:15:22
8	Peter Fredriksson	Sweden	2:15:38
9	Mario Quezas	Mexico	2:16:03
10	Andy Boychuk	Canada	2:16:13

Other notable finishers included Amby Burfoot (32nd), and John J. Kelley (167th).

=== Women ===
Position	Athlete	Nationality	Time
1	Liane Winter	West Germany	2:42:24
2	Kathrine Switzer	United States	2:51:37
3	Gayle Barron	United States	2:54:11
4	Marilyn Bevans	United States	2:55:52
5	Merry Cushing	United States	2:56:57
6	Kathryn Loper	United States	2:59:10
7	Marilyn Paul	United States	2:59:37
8	Joan Ullyot	United States	3:02:20
9	Judy Gumbs	United States	3:02:54
10	Janice Arenz	United States	3:03:03
