= Gerry Davidson =

American long-distance runner

Gerry Davidson (March 12, 1921 – August 5, 2011) was an American long-distance runner from Fallbrook, California. She is the former world record holder in the W85 Mile run (and previously in the W80 division). She is also the American record holder in most W80 and W85 track events from the 400 metres through the 10,000 metres and several road running records going back to 1991 when she was 70 years old.

Davidson first took up jogging for exercise when she moved to Fallbrook in the 1970s. It was the era of the running boom of the 1970s and the thing to do. Eventually she took on competitive running by entering the annual L'eggs Mini-Marathon in nearby San Diego. That was the only race she did for several years until it was discontinued. The competitive bug had bitten, she became a fixture in the local running scene, has run in marathons coast to coast and began running in the sport of masters athletics.

It was coincidental that she set her Mile world record on the same day that Alan Webb broke Jim Ryun's fabled high school mile record. She died in Seal Beach, California on August 5, 2011.
