= Bruce Lehane =

Bruce Lehane (January 11, 1949 – September 23, 2017) was the cross country, middle distance, and long distance track and field coach at Boston University from 1982 to 2017.

== Early life and running career ==
Lehane grew up in South Boston, Massachusetts. He began his cross country and track career at Boston English High School and continued his career at Boston State College. There, he set school records in the 880 yard run (1:52.1) and mile run (4:11.2) and earned N.A.I.A. All-American honors under coach Bill Squires.

== Coaching career ==
Lehane began coaching at Boston University in 1982; he coached 50 D.1 NCAA All-Americans, 7 national champions, 7 world champions, and 2 Olympians. Lehane said of coaching, "No one system works for all athletes. The key to successful training is to match the training loads to what the individual athlete benefits from."

World Championship athletes under Lehane include: Cross Country: Lesley Lehane (5th place), Rosemary Ryan, Matthew Smith, Karl Rasmussen, Are Nakkim, Eirik Hansen, and Markku Kyyronen.

Individual National Champions under Lehane include: Lesley Lehane (USA XC, 3k Indoors), Matthew Smith (British XC), Karl Rasmussen (Norwegian XC), Are Nakkim (Norwegian 5k, 10k), Eirik Hansen (Norwegian 5k, 10k), Jennifer Lanctot (NCAA mile), and Dean Crowe (NCAA 5000).

Olympic Appearances by athletes under Lehane include: Rosemary Ryan (2000 Olympics) and Cathy O'Brien (1988 Olympics).

== Other works ==
Lehane co-authored the book Speed With Endurance with Bill Squires.

== Personal ==
Bruce Lehane married his wife Lesley in 1987 and had three sons.

His son Elliot was in the class of 2012 at BU and ran on the cross-country and track and field teams. He was an assistant coach at BU for 2 seasons from 2015 to 2017.

== Quotes ==
"Putting on the meets is a labor of love. We give thanks to all who participated and to all who came to spectate - except to the guy who threw up in the sink in the men's room. Like us, he has got to clean up his act."
