= Tom Howard (runner) =

Canadian long-distance runner

Personal information
- Nationality: Canadian
- Born: 20 September 1948 (age 77) Vancouver, British Columbia, Canada

Sport
- Sport: Long-distance running
- Event: Marathon
Medal record
Representing Canada
Pan American Games
Bronze medal – third place	1975 Mexico City	Marathon

Thomas George "Tom" Howard (born 20 September 1948) is a Canadian long-distance runner. He competed in the marathon at the 1976 Summer Olympics.

== See also ==
- 1975 Boston Marathon
