= Sue Petersen =

American marathoner (born 1944)

Personal information
- Nationality: American
- Born: September 6, 1944 (age 81) Torrington, Connecticut
- Height: 5 ft 5 in (165 cm)
- Weight: 108 lb (49 kg)
Medal record
World Marathon Majors
Gold medal – first place	1980 Chicago	Marathon

Sue Petersen (born September 6, 1944) is a former American marathoner. During her running career, Petersen appeared at her first World Marathon Majors event at the 1977 Boston Marathon and placed in eleventh place. After placing in the top eight at the New York and Boston from 1978 to 1979, Petersen won her only major marathon at the 1980 Chicago Marathon. Upon her last major marathon appearance at Chicago in 1981, Petersen continued to compete in various marathons throughout the Western United States until 1987. After leaving running in 1988, Petersen worked as a teacher until her retirement in 2002.

== Early life and education ==
Petersen was born on September 6, 1944, and spent her childhood in Torrington, Connecticut. She ventured into sports as a high school cheerleader in Long Beach, California, before becoming a legal secretary in Jacksonville, North Carolina, upon her 1966 marriage. For her post-secondary education, Petersen studied physical education at Saddleback College and California State University Long Beach during the late 1970s.

== Career ==
Petersen began running alongside her husband at a 1976 marathon in Los Alamitos, California. While continuing to run in California, Petersen's first World Marathon Majors appearance was an 11th place finish at the 1977 Boston Marathon. After finishing third at the 1978 New York City Marathon, Petersen had a top eight finish at New York and Boston in 1979. Following her 35th placement at Boston in 1980, Petersen won the 1980 Chicago Marathon with a time of 2:45:03. The following year, Petersen finished her last major marathon at Chicago in fifth place. Between 1981 and 1987, Petersen primarily ran in marathons held throughout the Western United States. Petersen ended her running career in 1988 to become a teacher in Laguna Beach before retiring in 2002.

== Personal life ==
Petersen is married and has three children.
