= Gayle Olinekova =

Canadian runner and bodybuilder

- Born: March 3, 1953; Canada
- Died: November 26, 2003 (aged 50); City of Hope in Duarte, California
- Occupation: Marathoner
- Parent(s): Nestor and Lucy Olinek

Gayle Olinekova (birth name Olinek; March 3, 1953 – November 26, 2003) was a marathon runner and bodybuilder from Toronto Canada.

Olinekova, whom Sports Illustrated nicknamed the "Greatest Legs To Ever Stride The Earth," challenged the perception of femininity and athleticism during a time period when Title IX, which prohibits discrimination based on gender in school athletics, was first going into effect. Olinekova encouraged fellow female athletes to embrace a muscular physique by publicly declaring that strength is beauty.

== Biography ==
=== Early life ===
As a child, Gayle wouldn't take the bus to school. She would race the bus on foot (even on the coldest of mornings) just for the chance to stay in her warm bed ten minutes longer. At the time, she had no dreams of becoming a world-class runner. In her youth, Gayle Olinek (only later changed back to Olinekova as it had been in Ukraine), dreamed of being a concert pianist. Even at the age of five, she thrived on the rigorous discipline music required.

Still, she delighted in being the fastest kid on the block—faster, even, than the older boys. She was 10 when a shoe salesman in a large store had her try on every knee boot he had in her size before finally giving up because none could get over her calves. Her family was embarrassed by her legs, suggesting she hide them as they wondered aloud which of their Ukrainian ancestors had provided the genes for such an embarrassment, but Olinekova promised, "Someday people will pay to see these legs."

As a child, she was described as being a serious girl and a bit of a loner. She held a paper route to earn money for her music lessons until, around the age of fifteen, Olinekova decided to pour all that discipline into running.

==== First competitions ====
"On Christmas Eve, 1968, I promised myself that I would go for it. I loved to run and decided to put all my energies into that. I didn't even own a pair of running shoes."

At 15, still wearing sweat pants to hide her legs during workouts, she ran a 62-second quarter mile in her first real competition; it broke the Toronto girls' high school record by 10 seconds. Eight months later in June 1969, she was named to the Canadian national team. Thinking back on her first victory, Olinekova said, "I remember climbing onto the victory podium to get my bronze metal and thinking, 'Now I really have to learn how to train.'"

But she trained too hard and contracted mononucleosis. In her own words, training "took longer than I ever expected. Injury and mononucleosis from overtraining with my first two coaches made me realize that my overwhelming desire and effort were not enough."

It wasn't until two years later, in the spring of 1971, that she regained her strength. The Pan Am Games were coming up in July, and Olinekova went to the trials. She finished a strong second in the 800. But the Canadian authorities decided to send the woman who was third. They said her record was more consistent than Olinekova's.

=== College ===
Olinekova put sprinting on hold and used a scholarship to enroll at Ryerson Polytechnical Institute, where she studied modern dance, according to her book. (However, A Sports Illustrated article cites her as having studied journalism for a semester.)

"I had never danced anything in my life except a polka at my gradparents' fiftieth wedding anniversary," she explains in her 1982 book, Go For It!, "but the audition for this program was so crowded (476 hopefuls for 30 spots) I felt that there was nothing to lose. I was no match for all those nascent prima ballerinas, but I made it. The dance master said I was different and new, with a style all my own." It was through this program that Olinekova first realized that "moving your body could feel... beautiful and sensual."

The other dancers resented this newcomer at the start, but later choreographed dramatic pieces for Olinekova that highlighted her strength and speed—high leaps, turns, and bounding. Though Olikenova described the program as hard work, she said she found it extremely gratifying.

=== Leaving Canada ===
==== Amsterdam (1973) ====
Frustrated in her efforts to learn new things, Olinekova made plans to leave Canada at the age of 20. With just $150 to her name, she purchased a one-way ticket to Amsterdam for $100. She was hoping to find someone in Europe—maybe a sports hypnotherapist or famous doctor—who could help her find out what she needed to know.

"I had yet to explore the mental aspects of the sport. I felt I needed life experience. I got both in an almost two-year odyssey that saw me push myself mentally and physically beyond the periphery of anything I had known to that time."

==== European travels ====
She traveled to the sport science centers in Switzerland, Germany, Italy, and France, having to wait sometimes for hours before the famous scientists would deign to answer even one question. She studied German in order to understand East German translations of Soviet sports documents.

==== Switzerland (1974) ====
In the summer of her 21st year, Olinekova was hired as a lumberjack in the forests of Switzerland—the only woman among hundreds of men. When applying for this job clearing bush and planting trees, Olinekova was told by the foreman that they were "looking for men." Reportedly, she pulled up her pant leg and said, "I'm stronger than you are." The foreman replied, "You start in the morning."

Olinekova moved to Westlake Village, California to train for the first women's Olympic marathon in 1984. However, she was seriously injured in a car accident; not only did she miss out on the Olympics, but her running career was ended as well.

Olinekova only competed once as a bodybuilder, in the Frank Zane Invitational on June 28, 1980. However, she had a significant impact on the sport due to her amazing quadriceps and calf development. (Wennerstrom, 2004) Her amazing legs earned her national coverage in 1981, when she was the subject of a feature article in Sports Illustrated called "Greatest Legs To Ever Stride The Earth". (Levin, 1981)

Later in 1981, Olinekova appeared on the cover of the magazine New West, photographed by art photographer Helmut Newton. The photograph was one of several by Newton that ran under the heading "Strong Women: A Portfolio of California's Super Athletes".

=== Death and afterward ===
Olinekova died at Duarte, California at age 50 on November 26, 2003, after a long battle with breast cancer. In her eulogy, Rev. Rob Calderhead, pastor of La Canada United Methodist Church, explained that "although Olinekova was told by one doctor that she had only two months to live, she set her sights on recovery and courageously battled the disease for 3½ years, undergoing chemotherapy, radiation and stem cell replacement at the City of Hope hospital."

At the time of her death, she had been working as a chiropractor in Westlake Village. While there, she was said to have sometimes provided chiropractic services in exchange for fruit. At her memorial service, longtime friend Maura Barraza explained, "Money was never that important to Gayle: people were."

== Published works ==
Olinekova participated in a number of other sports, including speedskating, cycling, and rough-water rowing. She published several books on exercise and healthy lifestyles:

- Go For It! (1982), Simon & Schuster. ISBN 0-671-45692-X.
- Legs: Super Legs in Six Weeks (1983), Simon & Schuster. ISBN 0-671-47241-0.
- The Sensuality of Strength (1984), Simon & Schuster. ISBN 0-671-49187-3.
- Winning Without Steroids (1988), Keats Publishing. ISBN 0-87983-480-3.
- Power Aging: Staying Young At Any Age (1998), Thunder's Mouth PR. ISBN 1-56025-123-9.

== Personal bests ==
Event	Time	Place	Date
Marathon	2:41:33	New York, USA	October 26, 1980
Marathon	2:36:12	Scottsdale, Arizona	December 1, 1979
