= Bill Rodgers (runner) =

American distance runner (born 1947)

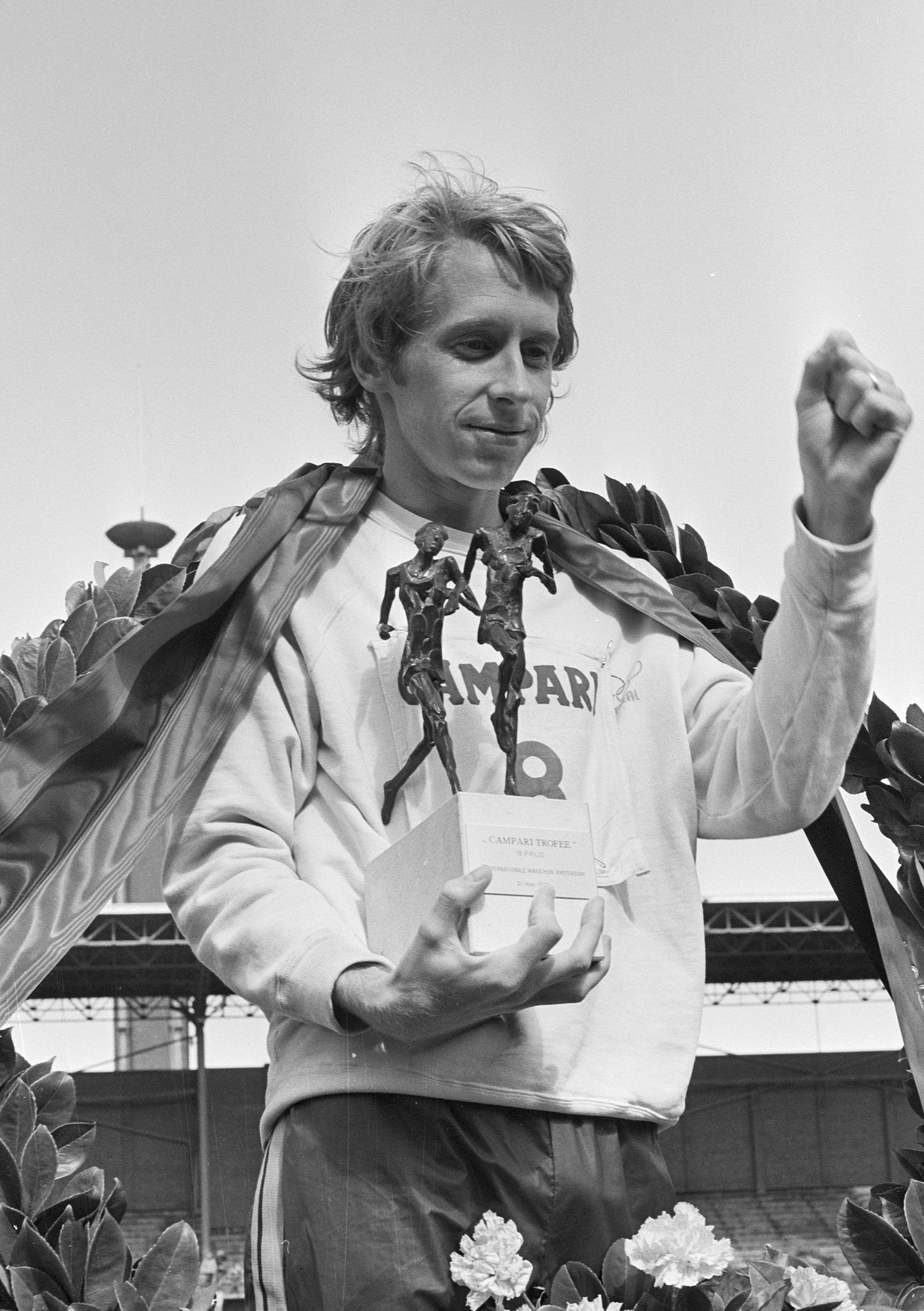
- Rodgers at the Amsterdam Marathon in 1977

Personal information
- Full name: William Henry Rodgers
- Born: December 23, 1947 (age 78) Hartford, Connecticut, U.S.
- Height: 5 ft 9 in (1.75 m)
- Weight: 130 lb (59 kg)

Sport
- Sport: Long-distance running
- Club: Greater Boston Track Club

Achievements and titles
- Personal bests: 5000 meters: 13:42.00; 10,000 meters: 28:04.42; Half marathon: 1:04:55; Marathon: 2:09:27
Medal record
Representing United States
World Cross Country Championships
Bronze medal – third place	1975 Rabat	Individual

William Henry Rodgers (born December 23, 1947) is an American runner, Olympian, and former record holder in the marathon. Rodgers is best known for his four victories in both the Boston Marathon, including three straight from 1978 to 1980, and 4 straight wins in the New York City Marathon, between 1976 and 1979.

== Biography ==
=== Early life ===
Born in Hartford, Connecticut, Rodgers moved to Newington, Connecticut, with his family when he was around five. He attended Newington High School, where he played hockey and baseball, along with his older brother Charlie. When Newington High School added cross country as a sport in the fall of 1963, sophomore Bill Rodgers decided to join. Running track and cross country under coach Frank O'Rourke, Rodgers ran the mile in 4:28:8, won the 1965 Connecticut state cross country title and finished seventh in the New England Cross Country Championships. He first ran a road race at the Manchester Thanksgiving Day 4.78 mile race in 1965. Despite his amazing success, he never won this famous race.

=== Running career ===
In the fall of 1966, Rodgers enrolled at Wesleyan University where he ran cross country and track, graduating with a B.A. in sociology in 1970. One of his teammates and college roommate, Amby Burfoot, won the 1968 Boston Marathon while still a student at Wesleyan and went on to edit Runner's World magazine. Another teammate and friend was future Olympian Jeff Galloway, who is a noted author on running.

After graduating in 1970, Rodgers enrolled to study and eventually receive his MS in special education from Boston College. After stepping away from competitive running for a time, in 1973, track coach Bill Squires first formed the Greater Boston Track Club at Boston College to train small group of local elite runners, with Rodgers becoming one of them.

In April 1973, Rodgers entered his first Boston Marathon, dropping out at mile 20. After the race, Rodgers quit running for three months, only to return to training. Rodgers then won the Bay State Marathon in 2:28 in October 1973.

In April 1974, Rodgers returned to run the Boston Marathon, finishing 14th. On October 29, 1974, Rodgers ran his first New York City Marathon, finishing fifth. One month after New York, Rodgers won the Philadelphia Marathon in 2:21.

In 1975, Rodgers then burst into national prominence when he won the 1975 Boston Marathon in 2:09:55, setting a new American record.

Rodgers won both the New York City Marathon and the Boston Marathon four times each between 1975 and 1980, twice breaking the American record at Boston with a time of 2:09:55 in 1975 and 2:09:27 in 1979. In 1977, he won the Fukuoka Marathon, making him the only runner ever to hold the championship of all three major marathons at the same time. He made the 1976 U.S. Olympic team and raced the marathon at the Montreal Olympics in 1976, finishing 40th in 2:25:14. He did not participate in the Olympics in 1980 due to the U.S. boycott over the invasion of Afghanistan by the USSR.

In 1975, Rodgers won the bronze medal at the IAAF World Cross Country Championships, equaling Tracy Smith's 1966 bronze in the International Cross Country Championships as the highest an American had ever finished in international cross country competition. Rodgers' most remarkable year on the road racing circuit came in 1978 when he won 27 of the 30 races he entered, including the Pepsi 10 km nationals (with a new world road 10 km best time of 28:36.3), the Falmouth Road Race, and the Boston and New York City marathons. Rodgers is also the former world record holder for 25 kilometers as he broke Pekka Päivärinta's world record with a time of 1:14.11.8 on a track at West Valley College in Saratoga, California, in 1979.

Track & Field News ranked Rodgers number one in the world in the marathon in 1975, 1977 and 1979. Of the 59 marathons Rodgers ran, 28 were run under 2:15. In all, he won 22 marathons in his career. He came to be referred to by sportswriters and others as "Boston Billy".

Rodgers was inducted to the National Track and Field Hall of Fame on December 3, 1999, in ceremonies in Los Angeles. In 1998, Rodgers was inducted in the first round to the National Distance Running Hall of Fame in Utica, New York.

Rodgers has run the Bix 7 road race in Davenport, Iowa, every year since 1980, earning the local nickname "Bix Billy". A bronze statue of Rodgers and Joan Benoit Samuelson was erected near the Bix finish line in 2007.

On April 20, 2015, Patriots' Day, Rodgers was honored by the Boston Red Sox as he threw out the ceremonial first pitch at Fenway Park.

Bill Rodgers Running Center in Faneuil Hall Marketplace in Boston was owned and operated by Bill and his brother Charlie. The family-run business operated from 1977 to 2013. He lives in the small town of Boxborough, Massachusetts, and still participates in running-themed events.

Rodgers was named as a Grand Marshal for the 2025 Boston Marathon, alongside long-time friend and fellow Boston Marathon champion, Bob Hall, a wheelchair athlete.

== Marathons ==
1. 1973 Boston Marathon (Did not Finish)(DNF)
2. 1973 Bay State Marathon (2:28:12) 1st Course Record (CR)
3. 1974 Boston (2:19:34) 14th
4. 1974 New York City Marathon (NYC) (2:36:00) 5th
5. 1974 Philadelphia Marathon (2:21:57) 1st CR
6. 1975 Boston (2:09:55) 1st American Record (AR)
7. 1975 Enschede Marathon, Netherlands (DNF)
8. 1975 Fukuoka Marathon (2:11:26) 3rd
9. 1976 Olympic Trials (2:11:58) 2nd
10. 1976 Montreal Olympics (2:25:14) 40th
11. 1976 NYC (2:10:10) 1st CR
12. 1976 Sado Island, Japan (2:08:23) 1st CR (200 meters short)
13. 1976 Maryland (2:14:12) 1st CR
14. 1977 Kyoto, Japan (2:14:25) 1st
15. 1977 Boston (DNF)
16. 1977 Amsterdam, Netherlands (2:12:47) 1st CR
17. 1977 Waynesboro (2:25:12) 1st
18. 1977 NYC (2:11:28) 1st
19. 1977 Fukuoka (2:10:55) 1st
20. 1978 Boston (2:10:13) 1st
21. 1978 NYC (2:12:12) 1st
22. 1978 Fukuoka (2:12:53) 6th
23. 1979 Boston (2:09:27) 1st AR
24. 1979 Montreal (2:22:12) 15th
25. 1979 NYC (2:11:42) 1st
26. 1980 Boston (2:12:11) 1st
27. 1980 Toronto (2:14:47) 1st
28. 1980 NYC (2:13:20) 5th
29. 1981 Houston-Tennaco (2:12:10) 1st CR
30. 1981 Boston (2:10:34) 3rd
31. 1981 Atlantica-Boavista, Rio de Janeiro, Brazil (2:14:13) 1st CR
32. 1981 Stockholm, Sweden (2:13:28) 1st
33. 1981 Bank One, Columbus, OH (2:17:34) 7th
34. 1982 Houston (2:14:51) 5th
35. 1982 Tokyo (2:24) 301st
36. 1982 Boston (2:12:38) 4th
37. 1982 Atlantica-Boavista, Rio de Janeiro, Brazil (DNF)
38. 1982 Melbourne, Australia (2:11:08) 1st
39. 1983 Orange Bowl, FL (2:15:08) 1st
40. 1983 Boston (2:11:58) 10th
41. 1983 Beijing, China (DNF)
42. 1983 Chicago (2:21:40) 30th
43. 1984 U.S. Olympic Trials (2:13:31) 8th
44. 1985 New Jersey Waterfront (2:14:46) 2nd
45. 1985 NYC (2:15:33) 7th
46. 1986 Boston (2:13:35) 4th
47. 1986 Chicago (2:15:31) 11th
48. 1987 Phoenix (DNF)
49. 1987 Boston (2:18:18) 15th
50. 1987 NYC (2:25:01) 54th
51. 1988 Phoenix (DNF)
52. 1988 Los Angeles (2:20:27) 2nd masters
53. 1988 Boston (2:18:17) 2nd masters
54. 1988 NYC (DNF)
55. 1989 Los Angeles (2:22:24)
56. 1990 Boston (2:20:46) 5th masters
57. 1992 Vietnam International 19th
58. 1996 Boston (2:53:23)
59. 1999 Boston (DNF)
60. 2009 Boston (4:06:49)

== Awards and distinctions ==
- 1973 AAU All-American Long Distance Team (20K)
- 1975 National AAU- DI Benadato Award – Best Athletic Performance
- 1975 Nominated Sullivan Award (placed second)
- 1975 Ranked #1 in the World in the Marathon by Track & Field News
- 1976 Ranked #6 in the World in the Marathon by Track & Field News
- 1976 Member U.S. Olympic Team – Montreal, Canada
- 1976 AAU All-American Track & Field Team (10K)
- 1977 Ranked #1 in the World in the Marathon by Track & Field News
- 1978 Ranked #2 in the World in the Marathon by Track & Field News
- 1979 Ranked #1 in the World in the Marathon by Track & Field News
- 1981 Ranked #7 in the World in the Marathon by Track & Field News
- 1989 New York Road Runners Club Abebe Bikila Award
- 1989 Tiffany's Man of Achievement Award
- 1990 RRCA Masters of the Year Award
- 1992 RRCA Masters of the Year Award
- 1994 CT Sports Writers Alliance Gold Key Award
- 1999 Inducted into Long Distance Running Hall of Fame
- 2000 Inducted into USA Track and Field Hall of Fame
- 2025 Inducted into the Credit Union Cherry Blossom Hall of Fame

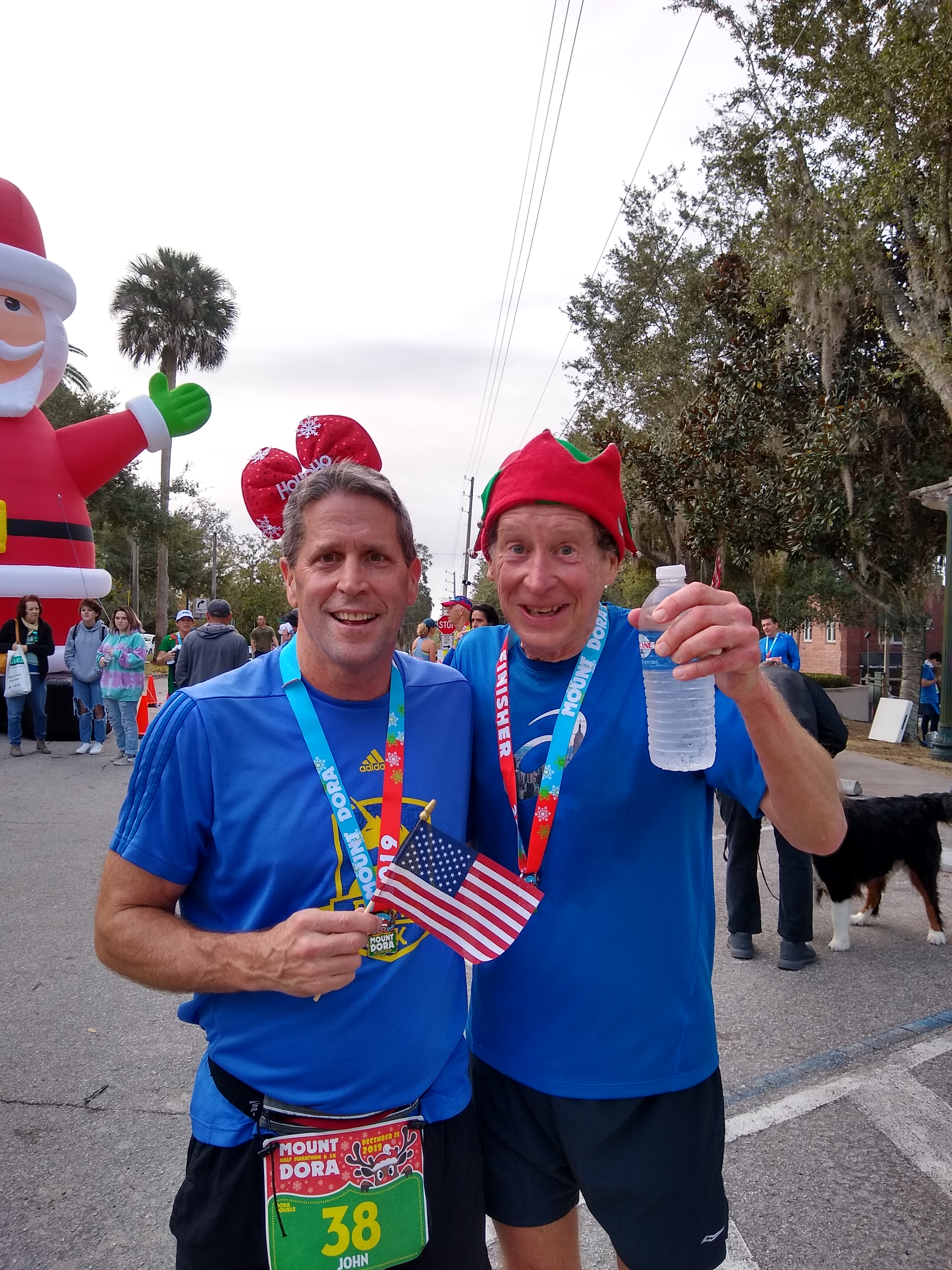
Bill Rodgers, on right, at the Mount Dora 5K in 2019.

== Personal track records ==
- 1 mile – 4:18.8
- 2 miles – 8:48 (indoor practice); 8:53.6 (1975)
- 3 miles – 13:25.4 (1976)
- 5 kilometers – 13:42.00 (1978)
- 10 kilometers – 28:04.4 (1976)
- 15 kilometers – 43:39.8 (1977 – American Record)
- 10 miles – 46:35
- 20 kilometers – 58:15 (1977 – American Record)
- 1 hour – 12 mi 1351 yd (20.556 km) (1977 – American Record)
- 25 kilometers – 1:14:12 (1979 – World and American Record)
- 30 kilometers – 1:31:50 (1979 – American Record)

== Personal road records ==
- 10 kilometers: 28:16 (1983)
- 15 kilometers: 43:25 (1981)
- 20 kilometers: 58:43 (1982)
- 25 kilometers: 1:17:23
- 30 kilometers: 1:29:04 (1976 – Unofficial World Road Record)
- Marathon (42.195 kilometers): 2:09:27 (1979 – former American record)

== Major road race wins ==
- Boston Marathon: 4 wins
- New York City Marathon: 4 wins
- Fukuoka Marathon: 1 win
- Amsterdam Marathon: 1 win
- Houston Marathon: 1 win
- Melbourne Marathon: 1 win
- Falmouth Road Race: 3 wins
- Virginia 10-Miler: 5 wins
- Cherry Blossom 10-Mile Run: 4 wins
- Boilermaker Road Race 15 km: 1 win
- Beverly Hills 10 km: 4 wins
- Azalea Trail 10 km: 4 wins
- Gurnet Classic Beach Run, Duxbury MA
- Bloomsday 12 km: 1 win
- Gasparilla Distance Classic 15 km: 1 win (first yr.)
- Jacksonville Gate River Run 15 km: 1 win, 1978
- Bix 7: 2 wins (incl. first yr.)
- Big Boy 20 km: 3 wins
- Toronto Marathon,1 win,1980

== See also ==
- List of winners of the Boston Marathon
- List of winners of the New York City Marathon
