= Patti Catalano =

American long-distance runner

Personal information
- Full name: Patti Catalano Dillon
- Born: Patti Lyons; April 6, 1953 (age 73)
- Spouse(s): Joe Catalano (1980-1984); Dan Dillon (1992-present)
- Children: 2

Sport
- Coached by: Joe Catalano

Achievements and titles
- Personal best: Marathon: 2:27:52 (1981)
Medal record
Women's athletics
World Marathon Majors
Silver medal – second place	1979 Boston	Marathon
Silver medal – second place	1980 New York	Marathon
Silver medal – second place	1980 Boston	Marathon
Silver medal – second place	1981 Boston	Marathon

Patti Catalano Dillon (née Lyons, April 6, 1953) is a former long-distance runner from the United States who is recognized by the International Association of Athletics Federations as having set world bests in the half marathon, 30 kilometers, and 20 kilometers. (Note: The International Association of Athletics Federations credits Catalano's 20 kilometers performance as "Patty Lyons", her maiden name. Various sources report that she also held a world record in the 5 mile; however, the IAAF currently does not recognize a world record or world best at that distance.) She was the first American woman to break 2:30 in the marathon in 1980. She was the runner-up in the 1980 New York City Marathon and the 1979-1981 Boston Marathons. She is Mi’kmaw.

== Early life ==
She grew up in Quincy, Massachusetts, in the working-class Houghs Neck neighborhood, the eldest of nine children. Her father was a second-generation Irish immigrant from Dorchester and an all-Navy boxer. Her mother, a Mi'kmaw woman, had run away from home in Nova Scotia when she was 11 and wound up in Quincy working as a nanny after lying about her age.

== Running career ==
Catalano has held the World Record in the marathon and American road records in the marathon, half marathon, 30 kilometers, 15 kilometers, 10 miles, and 5 mile (now 8 kilometers). Described as "one of the most dominating American female road runners of the 1970s" and "the queen of U.S. women distance runners", she was inducted into the National Distance Running Hall of Fame in 2006.

She unsuccessfully attempted to qualify for the 1984 Olympics.

Catalano won five of the first six runnings of the Ocean State Marathon (1976–1979, 1981) (Note: According to the Association of Road Racing Statisticians, Catalano posted a 2:33:31 in the 1981 race but "ran in a special division due to questions regarding her amateur status. Mary Hynes was the official winner of the women's division in 2:52:12.") and four consecutive at the Honolulu Marathon (1978–1981). Included among the many races she has won are the Montreal International Marathon (1980), Crim 10 miler (1980, 1981), the Crescent City Classic 10 km (1980, 1981), and the Rio de Janeiro Marathon (1985). (Note: Unlike the International Association of Athletics Federations, the Association of Road Racing Statisticians recognizes Catalano as having set a world best in the marathon with her 2:30:57.1 performance at the Montreal International Marathon on September 6, 1980. The IAAF progression includes two earlier marks from Grete Waitz, including a 2:27:33 performance at the 1979 New York City Marathon, which were set on a course that in 1981 was reported to be short.)

Catalano won the Rio de Janeiro Marathon despite getting food poisoning. This was one of her final marathons.

== Achievements ==
Year	Competition	Venue	Position	Event	Notes
Representing the United States
1978	Honolulu Marathon	Honolulu, Hawaii	1st	Marathon	2:43:10
1979	Honolulu Marathon	Honolulu, Hawaii	1st	Marathon	2:40:07
1980	New York Marathon	New York, New York	2nd	Marathon	2:29:33
1980	Honolulu Marathon	Honolulu, Hawaii	1st	Marathon	2:35:26
1981	Boston Marathon	Boston, United States	2nd	Marathon	2:27:52
1981	Houston Marathon	Houston, United States	1st	Marathon	2:35:28
1981	Eugene Marathon	Eugene OregonNike-OTC	3rd	Marathon	2:37:09
1981	Honolulu Marathon	Honolulu, Hawaii	1st	Marathon	2:33:24

== Personal life ==
Catalano is Mi’kmaw through her mother and reconnected to her heritage later in life. Toward the end of her running career, she struggled with injuries and bulimia. She divorced her coach, Joe Catalano. Several years later, following her third divorce and loss of her job, she struggled with homelessness.

In 1992, Catalano married Dan Dillon. Dillon was a Big East champion in the 3,000 meters and a cross country All-American at Providence College. As of 2003, they live in New London, Connecticut, with their two children. Catalano won Best in Show with a French Lop at the Pennsylvania Rabbit Convention.

== Notes ==
Records
Preceded by (United States) Ellison Goodall	Women's Half marathon World record holder 29 September 1979 – 29 March 1980	Succeeded by (Netherlands) Marja Wokke
