= Duel in the Sun (book) =

Book by John Brant

Duel in the Sun: Alberto Salazar, Dick Beardsley, and America's Greatest Marathon
- The cover of the 2006 hardcover edition.
- Author: John Brant
- Language: English
- Subject: Sportswriting; Running; Boston Marathon; Biographies
- Publisher: Rodale
- Publication date: 2006
- Publication place: United States
- Media type: Hardcover
- Pages: 256
- ISBN: 1-59486-262-1
- OCLC: 62172800
- Dewey Decimal: 796.42/52092 B 22
- LC Class: GV1061.14 .B73 2006

Duel in the Sun: Alberto Salazar, Dick Beardsley, and America's Greatest Marathon is a 2006 book by freelance sportswriter John Brant. Expanded from an article featured in Runner's World magazine, the book tells the story of two American distance runners, Dick Beardsley and Alberto Salazar, and how their lives changed after both men ran the 1982 Boston Marathon. Brant, a regular contributor to Runner's World since 1985 and a contributing editor at Outside, uses a writing style in the book that relies heavily on flashbacks and foreshadowing. The result of this style is that the story of the marathon and the story of the two men's lives are told simultaneously throughout the book.

Although the book has a plot and often reads like a work of fiction, it is in fact a non-fiction work, and the events described in the book actually occurred in real life.

== Plot summary ==
The early part of the book describes the preparations that Beardsley and Salazar underwent before the marathon, along with many other aspects of the men's running backgrounds and personal lives.

There are three concurrent story lines: Beardsley's life, Salazar's life, and the marathon itself. It is revealed early on that Salazar, who was already a renowned distance runner in the late 1970s and early '80's, was the favorite to win Boston. Beardsley, described as a small-town farmboy, is clearly the underdog. But as the race progresses and the stories of the two men's lives are developed in greater detail, it becomes clear that both men will have a chance at winning the Boston Marathon, for Americans the most prestigious in the world.

The story gradually becomes an intense contest between Beardsley and Salazar as they leave the rest of the runners behind during the latter part of the marathon. The title comes from the two men's shadows cast by the hot sun onto the pavement as they run "in each other's pockets" during the final miles of the race, and anticipation builds as to who will win the "duel." The shadow is also featured prominently on the cover of the first edition as part of the title.

After the race, the lives of both runners spiral downhill. The book describes in detail Salazar's depression and compromised immune system, and Beardsley's industrial accident and drug addiction.

== Connection to Cuba and Fidel Castro ==
Salazar's father, Jose Salazar, was a Cuban expatriat who had fought alongside Fidel Castro to overthrow the government of Fulgencio Batista in the 1950s. Jose Salazar remained a Castro supporter until Castro assumed power and aligned with the communists. This story and the influence it had on Alberto Salazar is told in some detail in one of the flashbacks during the early part of the book.

== Criticism and praise ==
- The book has received positive reviews for its message, which some critics consider to be inspirational and uplifting.
- Other critics complain that the unique narrative style "creates distance instead of allowing readers into the runners' heads."

== See also ==
- Grandma's Marathon
- Greater Boston Track Club
