= Jukka Toivola =

Finnish long-distance runner

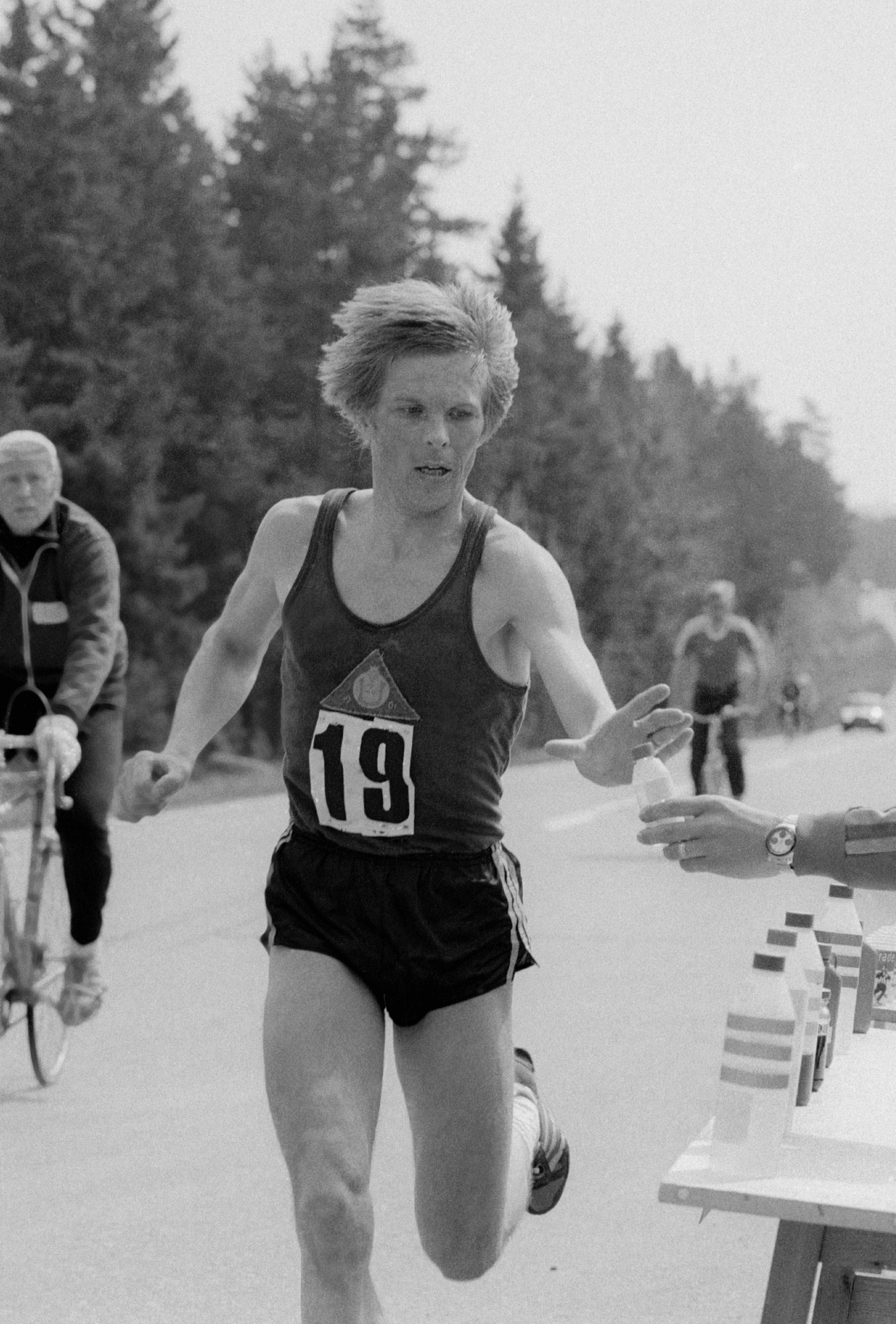
- Jukka Toivola in 1979, running in Mariehamn.

Personal information
- Born: 7 September 1949 Liperi, Finland
- Died: 27 May 2011 (aged 61) Pori, Finland

Sport
- Sport: Marathon running

Jukka Olavi Toivola (7 September 1949 – 27 May 2011) was a male long-distance runner and teacher of chemistry from Finland.

Born in Liperi, North Karelia, Toivola represented his native country at the 1976 Summer Olympics in the men's marathon, finishing in 27th place. In 1979, he won the first edition of the Stockholm Marathon.

Toivola died in 2011 in Pori, after suffering from ALS since 2007.

== Achievements ==
Year	Competition	Venue	Position	Event	Notes
Representing Finland
1976	Olympic Games	Montréal, Canada	27th	Marathon	2:20:46
1979	Stockholm Marathon	Stockholm, Sweden	1st	Marathon	2:17:35
1981	Boston Marathon	Boston, United States	6th	Marathon	2:11:53
1981	New York City Marathon	New York, United States	2nd	Marathon	2:10:52
1982	European Championships	Athens, Greece	5th	Marathon	2:17:31
