= Grete Waitz =

Norwegian marathon runner and former world record holder

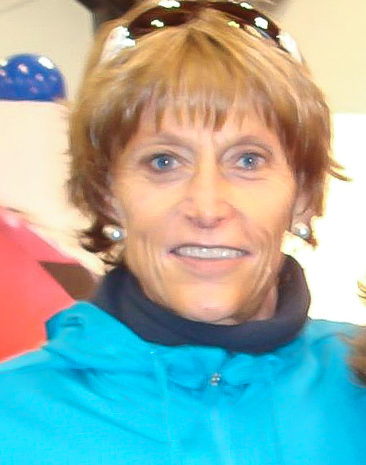
- Waitz in New York City in 2010

Personal information
- Born: 1 October 1953 Oslo, Norway
- Died: 19 April 2011 (aged 57) Oslo, Norway
- Height: 5 ft 8 in (1.73 m)
- Weight: 120 lb (54 kg)

Sport
- Country: Norway
- Sport: Sport of athletics
- Event: Marathon
Medal record
Women's athletics
Representing Norway
Olympic Games
Silver medal – second place	1984 Los Angeles	Marathon
World Championships
Gold medal – first place	1983 Helsinki	Marathon
World Cross Country Championships
Gold medal – first place	1978 Glasgow	Senior
Gold medal – first place	1979 Limerick	Senior
Gold medal – first place	1980 Paris	Senior
Gold medal – first place	1981 Madrid	Senior
Gold medal – first place	1983 Gateshead	Senior
Bronze medal – third place	1982 Rome	Senior
Bronze medal – third place	1984 East Rutherford	Senior
European Championships
Bronze medal – third place	1974 Rome	1500 m
Bronze medal – third place	1978 Prague	3000 m
IAAF World Cup
Gold medal – first place	1977 Düsseldorf	3000 m
Silver medal – second place	1979 Montreal	3000 m
Marathons
Gold medal – first place	1978 New York City	Marathon
Gold medal – first place	1979 New York City	Marathon
Gold medal – first place	1980 New York City	Marathon
Gold medal – first place	1982 New York City	Marathon
Gold medal – first place	1983 New York City	Marathon
Gold medal – first place	1983 London	Marathon
Gold medal – first place	1984 New York City	Marathon
Gold medal – first place	1985 New York City	Marathon
Gold medal – first place	1986 New York City	Marathon
Gold medal – first place	1986 London	Marathon
Gold medal – first place	1988 New York City	Marathon
Gold medal – first place	1988 Stockholm	Marathon

Grete Waitz, née Andersen (1 October 1953 – 19 April 2011) was a Norwegian marathon runner and former world record holder. In 1979, at the New York City Marathon, she became the first woman in history to run the marathon in under two and a half hours. Waitz won nine New York City Marathons, women's division, between 1978 and 1988, the highest number of victories in a single big city marathon in history. She won the silver medal at the 1984 Olympic Games in Los Angeles and a gold medal at the 1983 World Championships in Helsinki. She was also a five-time winner of the World Cross Country Championships.

Waitz four times set a world record in the marathon, twice at the 3000 metres, and she set world records at distances of 8 kilometers, 10 kilometers, 15 kilometers and 10 miles. She won 12 World Marathon Majors, the most for any runner, earning her a place in the Guinness World Records. Her other marathon victories included winning the London Marathon in 1983 and 1986 and the Stockholm Marathon in 1988.

== Background ==
Born Grete Andersen in Oslo, Norway, Waitz was a talented young runner, but had difficulty in getting her parents to take her potential profession seriously. However, she ran at the 1972 Summer Olympics in Munich in the 1500 metres, and to support her athletic career she studied at a teachers college.

== Career ==
In her teen years, Andersen won national junior titles in Norway in the 400 and 800 metres. At age 17, she set the European junior record for the 1500 metres with a time of 4:17 and won the bronze medal at the European Athletics Championships in this event in 1974. Andersen won the British WAAA Championships title in the 1500 metres event at the 1974 WAAA Championships.

In 1975, Waitz broke the 3000 metres world record, running 8:46.6 in Oslo. Also in Oslo a year later, she lowered this record with an 8:45.4 effort, then in 1977 she won the gold medal over the distance at the inaugural IAAF World Cup in Athletics meet in Düsseldorf with a personal best time of 8:43.50. Two years later in Montreal, she won the silver medal, and came to her all-time personal best of 8:31.75 in Oslo.

She ran the 1500 m at the European Championships in Prague on 3 September 1978. The run was won by Giana Romanova (USSR) in 3:59.01. Waitz placed fifth, with a career best of 4:00.55. It still stands as the Norwegian national record. Back then it was the eighth best time for the 1500 m. On 29 August at the Championships, she placed third in the 3000 m, with a time of 8:34.33. The winner was Svetlana Ulmasova with 8:33.16.

=== New York City Marathon 1978 ===
It was in 1978 that Waitz' association with the New York City Marathon began; she was invited to run there by race co-founder and director Fred Lebow, and in her first appearance, she not only won but took a full two minutes off the women's course record. On 22 October 1978, she finished in 2:32:30 more than 9 minutes ahead of Marty Cooksey's 2:41:49. Cooksey won the San Diego Half Marathon on 26 Aug in 1:15:04. Waitz' winning time there was a world record. During 1978, the world record in the women's marathon was 2:34:47.5 set on 10 September 1977 by Christa Vahlensieck at the Berlin Marathon. In 1981, the 1978 NYC course was remeasured and found 151 meters short. She further improved her NYC record with her following victories in 1979 and 1980.

According to the Association of Road Racing Statisticians (ARRS) Waitz had a 28 race winning streak from 22 September 1979 with a win in a 10-mile road race in Lynchburg (USA) until 8 June 1981 her win in a 3000 m track race in Basel (Switzerland).

Waitz went on to win the race nine times and broke the course record three years in a row. In 1979, she won the NYC marathon in 2:27:33. Gillian Adams was the runner up with 2:38:33. Her winning time in the 1980 edition was 2:25:41, Patti Lyons-Catalano placed second with 2:29:33.

In 1983, she set the world record to 2:25:29, which she ran in London. Besides her marathon victories in New York and at the 1983 World Championships in Helsinki, Waitz also won the London Marathon in 1983 and 1986 (the latter in a personal best of 2:24:54), as well as the Stockholm Marathon in 1988 at 2:28:24 (which as of 2022 was still the Stockholm course record for women).

Waitz enjoyed much success on the road at non-marathon distances as well, including a win at the Falmouth Road Race in 1980, four victories at the prestigious 10-km Peachtree Road Race in Atlanta, five wins at the L'eggs Mini-Marathon in New York, and world road records at 8 km (25:03), twice in the 10-km (31:16 in 1979, then later to 30:59), 15-km (48:01), and 10-mile distances. She further demonstrated her versatility by successfully competing in cross country, earning two bronze medals (1982, 1984) at the IAAF World Cross Country Championships and winning the gold medal five times, (1978–1981 and 1983), tying her with Doris Brown Heritage for most wins in the history of women's International / World Cross Country Championships.

Waitz' last race was a victory at 5000 metres in Oslo in June 1982, in which her 15:08.80 was the second best in history, falling only a half second short of the world record set three weeks earlier by Mary Slaney.

The only significant award Waitz did not win in her career was an Olympic victory. As an up-and-coming 19-year-old in Munich and then a 23-year-old running the 1500 m in Montreal (the longest event allowed for women in the Olympics up until 1984), she competed, but did not medal, in an event that was far short of her specialty. In 1980, Norway was one of the countries that decided to boycott the 1980 Summer Olympics in Moscow. At the 1984 Summer Olympics, she finished second in the marathon to Joan Benoit, taking the silver medal. In the 1988 Summer Olympics in Seoul, South Korea, a bad knee forced her to drop out of the women's marathon just after passing the 18-mile mark.

Waitz completed her last marathon on 1 November 1992 with her friend Fred Lebow. In celebration of Lebow's 60th birthday, after he was diagnosed with brain cancer in early 1990, they both completed the New York City Marathon with a time of 5:32:35.

== Personal bests ==
Source: IAAF

- 1500 metres – 4:00.55 – Prague – 3 September 1978
- One mile – 4:26.90 – Gateshead – 9 July 1978
- 3000 metres – 8:31.75 – Oslo (Bislett) – 17 July 1979
- 15 kilometres – 47:52 – Tampa, FL – 11 February 1984
- Marathon – 2:24:54 – London – 20 April 1986

== After retirement ==
Although not competing at the top level, Waitz still ran in and organised corporate races in which she aimed to give advice and information on distance running and health. She also did charity work, particularly for the CARE International and the International Special Olympics. In June 2005 it was publicly known that she was undergoing treatment for cancer. She also coached Liz McColgan. For more than 25 years, Waitz served as the ambassador for the worldwide JPMorgan Chase Corporate Challenge Series, promoting health and wellness to full-time workers. She provided regular training and motivational tips. Waitz was also a spokesperson for Avon Products.

In August 2009 it was revealed that Waitz had initiated a co-operation between her old sponsor, Adidas, and the cancer care foundation she started in 2007 – "Aktiv mot kreft" (Norwegian for "Active against cancer"). The co-operation would mean that the cancer care foundation would get 5% of the proceeds from Adidas' sale of their Grete Waitz and Modern Classics collections. This could be as much as NOK 500 million per year, which would go to the establishment of hospital physical training centres and investment in PET-scanners.

== Death ==
Waitz died of cancer on 19 April 2011, aged 57. She was first diagnosed in 2005, but the specific type of cancer was never disclosed to the public. Waitz was survived by her husband Jack and brothers Jan and Arild. The Norwegian government later announced she would be buried with government honor at state expense, the sixth woman in Norwegian history to be given this honor. This was equivalent to a state funeral, although in accordance with her family wishes the ceremony was private.

== Legacy ==
Waitz won 13 out of 20 marathons. With nine NYC Marathon wins, two London Marathon wins, and one World Championship win, she is the record holder for World Major Marathons.

Waitz is widely acknowledged as helping to promote marathon and long-distance running for women. In Norway she is a sporting legend, with an annual race named in her honor. The New York Road Runners club annually sponsors "Grete's Great Gallop," formerly a half-marathon and now a 10K, in her honor.

There is a statue of Waitz in the Norway pavilion in EPCOT at the Walt Disney World Resort. There is also a statue of her outside Bislett Stadium in Oslo, and she has been featured on a set of stamps. In addition, Waitz' portrait is featured on the tail of a Norwegian Air Shuttle 787 Dreamliner aircraft (a plane, coincidentally, manufactured in North Charleston, South Carolina, a market where she won the Charleston-area 10 km race in 1989).

In November 2008, Waitz was appointed a Knight 1st Class of the Royal Norwegian Order of St. Olav, bestowed by King Harald V of Norway at a ceremony in Oslo. She was only the third sportsperson ever to receive this award. Waitz received the St. Olav's Medal in 1981 and Medal of St. Hallvard in 1989.

== Achievements ==
Year	Competition	Venue	Position	Event	Notes
Representing Norway
1972	Olympic Games	Munich, Germany	heats	1500 m	4.16.0
1974	European Championships	Rome, Italy	3rd	1500 m	4.05.2
1976	Olympic Games	Montreal, Canada	semi-final	1500 m	4.04.80
1977	IAAF World Cup	Düsseldorf, Germany	1st	3000 metres	8:43.50
1978	World Cross Country Championships	Glasgow, United Kingdom	1st	4.728 km	16:19
1978	European Championships	Prague, Czech Republic	3rd	3000 metres	8:34.33
1978	New York City Marathon	New York City, United States	1st	Marathon	2:32:30
1979	World Cross Country Championships	Limerick, Ireland	1st	5.04 km	16:48
1979	IAAF World Cup	Montreal, Canada	2nd	3000 metres	8:38.59
1979	New York City Marathon	New York City, United States	1st	Marathon	2:27:33
1980	World Cross Country Championships	Paris, France	1st	4.82 km	15:05
1980	New York City Marathon	New York City, United States	1st	Marathon	2:25:41
1981	World Cross Country Championships	Madrid, Spain	1st	4.41 km	14:07
1982	World Cross Country Championships	Rome, Italy	3rd	4.663 km	14:43.9
1982	New York City Marathon	New York City, United States	1st	Marathon	2:27:14
1983	World Cross Country Championships	Gateshead, United Kingdom	1st	4.072 km	13:29
1983	London Marathon	London, United Kingdom	1st	Marathon	2:25:29
1983	World Championships	Helsinki, Finland	1st	Marathon	2:28:09
1983	New York City Marathon	New York City, United States	1st	Marathon	2:27:00
1984	World Cross Country Championships	East Rutherford, United States	3rd	5 km	15:58
1984	Olympic Games	Los Angeles, United States	2nd	Marathon	2:26:18
1984	New York City Marathon	New York City, United States	1st	Marathon	2:29:30
1985	New York City Marathon	New York City, United States	1st	Marathon	2:28:34
1986	London Marathon	London, United Kingdom	1st	Marathon	2:24:54
1986	New York City Marathon	New York City, United States	1st	Marathon	2:28:06
1988	Stockholm Marathon	Stockholm, Sweden	1st	Marathon	2:28:24
1988	Olympic Games	Seoul, South Korea	–	Marathon	DNF
1988	New York City Marathon	New York City, United States	1st	Marathon	2:28:07
1990	New York City Marathon	New York City, United States	4th	Marathon	2:34:34

== Audio interview ==
- TheFinalSprint.com's interview with running pioneer Grete Waitz

Records
Preceded by Lyudmila Bragina	Women's 3 000 m world record holder 24 June 1975 – 7 August 1976	Succeeded by Lyudmila Bragina
Preceded by (West Germany) Christa Vahlensieck	Women's marathon world record holder 22 October 1978 – 18 April 1983	Succeeded by (United States) Joan Benoit
Preceded by (United States) Joan Benoit	Women's Half marathon World record holder 15 May 1982 – 18 September 1983	Succeeded by (United States) Joan Benoit
Sporting positions
Preceded by Joyce Smith; Ingrid Kristiansen	Women's London Marathon winner 1983; 1986	Succeeded by Ingrid Kristiansen; Ingrid Kristiansen
Preceded by Lyudmila Bragina; Lyudmila Bragina	Women's 3000 m Best Year Performance; 1975; 1977–1979	Succeeded by Lyudmila Bragina; Yelena Sipatova
Preceded by Ingrid Kristiansen	Women's fastest marathon race 1986	Succeeded by Ingrid Kristiansen
