= Inge Simonsen =

Norwegian long-distance runner

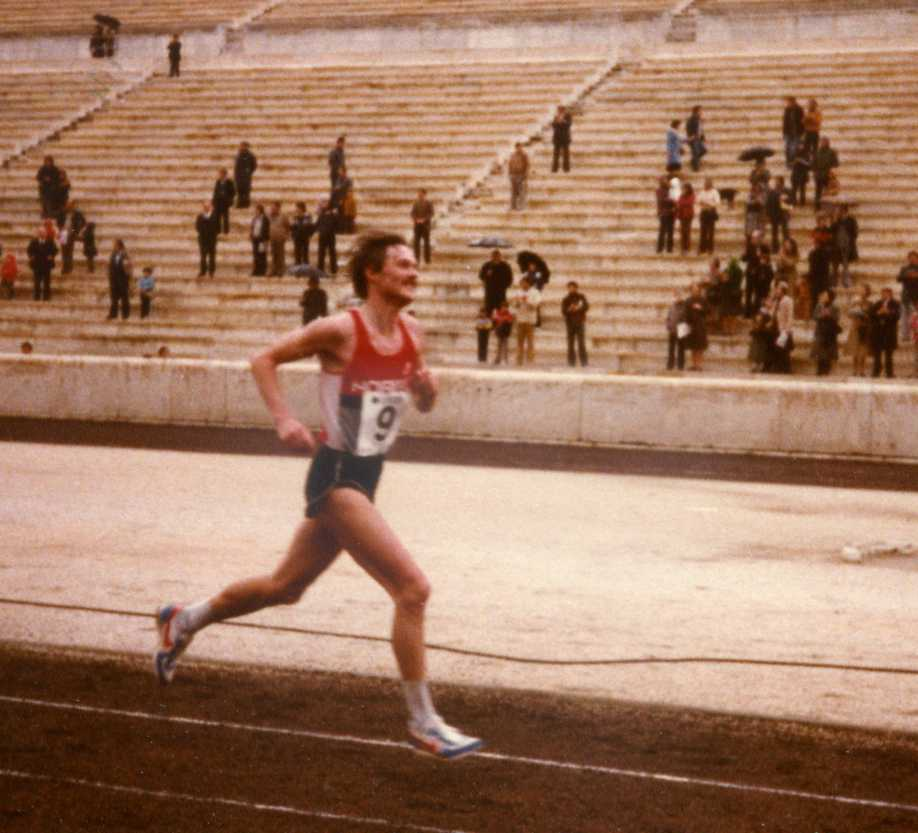
Simonsen finishing the IAAF Citizen Golden Marathon in Athens, Greece, 7 March 1982 in 2:15:03 for 6th place

Inge Simonsen (born 1 July 1953) is a Norwegian distance runner who tied for first place in the inaugural 1981 London Marathon. In that race, he and the other winner, American Dick Beardsley, intentionally crossed the finish line, in 2:11:48, holding hands in a dead heat. According to Beardsley, "It was a big deal for both of us because neither one of us had won a marathon before."

== Achievements ==
- All results regarding marathon, unless stated otherwise

Year	Competition	Venue	Position	Notes
Representing Norway
1981	London Marathon	London, United Kingdom	1st	2:11:48
1981	New York City Marathon	New York, United States	14th	2:13:38
