= Joan Benoit =

American distance runner (born 1957)

Joan Benoit Samuelson
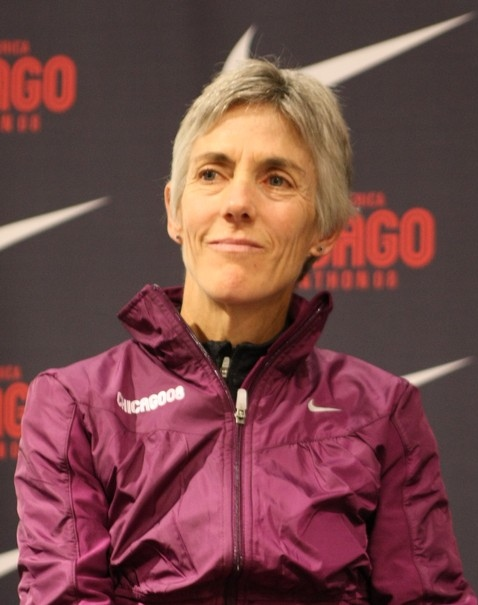
- Benoit in 2008

Personal information
- Full name: Joan Benoit Samuelson
- Born: Joan Benoit; May 16, 1957 (age 69) Cape Elizabeth, Maine, U.S.
- Height: 5 ft 2 in (157 cm)
- Spouse: Scott Samuelson (m. 1984)
- Children: 2

Sport
- Country: USA
- Sport: Track and field athletics
- Events: 3000 m, Marathon
- College team: Bowdoin, North Carolina State
- Club: Athletics West
- Coached by: Bob Sevene

Achievements and titles
- Olympic finals: 1984; Marathon, 1st
- Personal best: Marathon: 2:21:21 (1985)
Medal record
Women's athletics
Representing the United States
Olympic Games
Gold medal – first place	1984 Los Angeles	Marathon
World Marathon Majors
Gold medal – first place	1983 Boston	Marathon
Gold medal – first place	1985 Chicago	Marathon
Bronze medal – third place	1981 Boston	Marathon
Bronze medal – third place	1988 New York	Marathon
Pan American Games
Gold medal – first place	1983 Caracas	3,000 metres

Joan Benoit Samuelson (née Benoit; born May 16, 1957) is an American marathon runner who was the first women's Olympic Games marathon champion, winning the gold medal at the 1984 Summer Olympics in Los Angeles. She held the fastest time for an American woman at the Chicago Marathon for 32 years after winning the race in 1985. Her time at the Boston Marathon was the fastest time by an American woman in that race for 28 years. She was inducted into the Maine Women's Hall of Fame in 2000.

== Competitive life and Boston Marathon victories ==
Born in Cape Elizabeth, Maine, Benoit took to long-distance running to help recover from a broken leg suffered while slalom skiing. At Bowdoin College, she excelled in athletics. In 1977, after two years at Bowdoin, she accepted a running scholarship to North Carolina State, where she began concentrating solely on her running. She earned All-America honors at NC State in both 1977 and 1978. In 1978, she helped lead the Wolfpack to the Atlantic Coast Conference cross-country championship. She won the Broderick Award (Honda Sports Award) as the nation's best female collegiate cross-country runner for 1979–80.

After returning to Bowdoin to complete her degree, she entered the 1979 Boston Marathon as a relative unknown. She won the race, wearing a Boston Red Sox cap, in 2:35:15, knocking eight minutes off the competition record. In 1981, she captured the U.S. 10,000 meter championship, posting a time of 33:37.50. Despite having surgery on her Achilles tendons two years earlier, she repeated her marathon success with a victory in 1983, setting a course record of 2:22:43. That took more than two minutes off the world's best time, set by Norway's Grete Waitz in the London Marathon only a day earlier. Her Boston record was not broken for another 11 years.

== Olympic success and later life ==
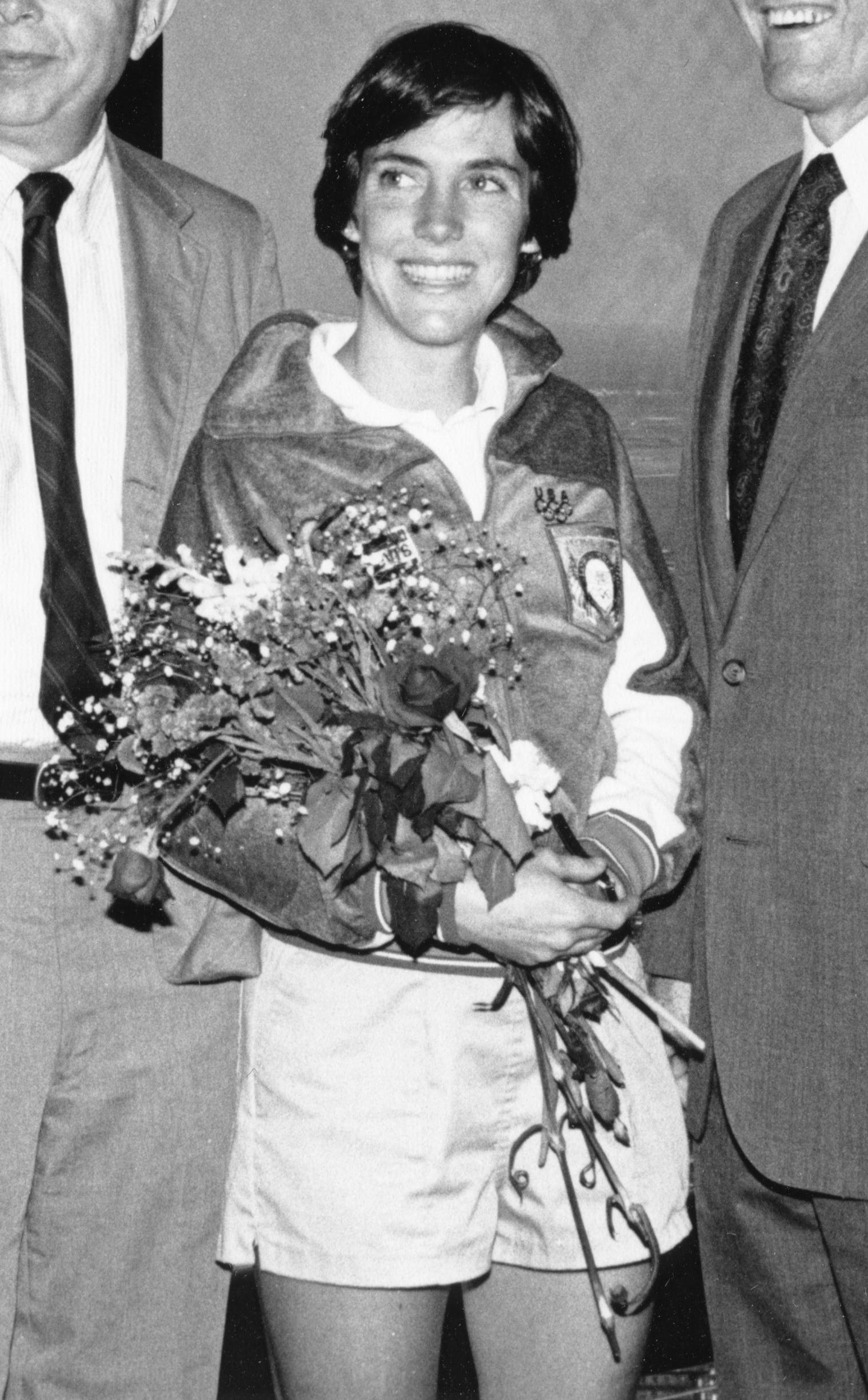
Benoit in 1984

In March 1984, Benoit injured her knee during a 20-mile training run, forcing her to undergo arthroscopic knee surgery just 17 days before the United States Olympic Women's Marathon Trials were scheduled. However, she recovered from the surgery much more quickly than expected and was the favorite in the trials at Olympia, Washington. She beat runner-up Julie Brown by 30 seconds, winning in 2:31:04. Three months later, she competed in the 1984 Summer Olympics in Los Angeles, winning the first Olympic Women's Marathon in 2:24:52, several hundred meters ahead of Grete Waitz, Rosa Mota, and Ingrid Kristiansen.

Benoit enjoyed success at non-marathon distances as well, winning the prestigious Falmouth Road Race (7.1 miles), a total of six times (1976, 1978, 1981–1983, and 1985), breaking the course record on four of those occasions.

Although she won the 1985 Chicago marathon, defeating Kristiansen and Mota in an American Record time of 2:21:21 (that would last as the AR for 18 years until broken by Deena Kastor in 2003 in London), Benoit was hampered for some years after her Olympic victory by injuries and struggled to compete in major races. She received the 1985 James E. Sullivan Award as the top amateur athlete in the United States.

Benoit wrote Running Tide (1987) and Running for Women (1995).

In 1998, she founded the Beach to Beacon 10K Road Race, a 10 km (6.2 mi) race held in Cape Elizabeth, Maine, each August, going from Crescent Beach State Park to Fort Williams Park and Portland Head Light. The race attracts many of the world's top distance runners. Elite runners often run this race and then, the following weekend, run the Falmouth Road Race on Cape Cod, Massachusetts. Benoit won that race several times, and ran it last in 2022, finishing as the 69th woman overall and first in her age group.

In 2003, at age 46, Benoit won the Maine half-marathon, defeating a field dominated by runners two decades her junior, and she was faster than all but six men overall, finishing in 1:18. In 2006, she helped pace former cycling champion Lance Armstrong as he competed in the New York City Marathon. At the 2008 US Olympic Team trials, at the age of 50, she finished in 2:49:08, setting a new US 50+ record and beating her personal goal at the time of a mid-2:50s marathon. When she ran the New York City Marathon on November 1, 2009, she broke the Senior Masters record for runners older than 50 with a final time of 2:49:09. On October 10, 2010, she ran 2:47:50 for the 43rd place at the Chicago Marathon—the site of her American record a quarter century earlier—missing her goal of qualifying for an eighth Olympic Marathon Team Trials race by 1:50, but recording the fastest-ever performance by a woman over 52. Later that month, she ran in the Athens Classic Marathon for fun and finished in 3:02, the slowest time of her career; she was not fully healed from her Chicago performance. In April 2011, Joan competed in the Boston Marathon, completing the course in 2:51:29 and placing 1st in her age group. Between 2013 and 2015, Samuelson ran the Boston Marathon each year, setting three of the four fastest marathon times for the 55–59 age group. None are recognized by the World Masters Athletics since the Boston Marathon course does not comply with IAAF regulations. Her times are 2:50:33 (2013), 2:52:15 (2014), and 2:54:26 (2015). In 2019, Benoit ran the Boston Marathon again, forty years after her 1979 win. She had hoped to be within 40 minutes of her 1979 time, but did even better than that with a time of 3:04:00, within thirty minutes of her winning time, again winning her age group (60–64).

Winning the race four times, Benoit has run the Bix 7 road race in Davenport, Iowa, annually since 1983. A bronze statue of Benoit and Bill Rodgers was erected near the Bix finish line in 2007.

Benoit resides in Freeport, Maine, where the high school athletic complex is named the "Joan Benoit Samuelson Track and Field". In addition to her running, as of 2014, she serves as a coach to women's cross-country and long-distance athletes, and is a motivational speaker and sports commentator. She is featured on the Nike+ iPod system as one of the congratulatory voices. Benoit and her husband, Scott Samuelson, whom she met when they were both students at Bowdoin College, have two children, daughter Abby and son Anders, who are runners in their own right and shared the running of the 2014 Boston Marathon with their mother.

Benoit was inducted into the National Distance Running Hall of Fame in 1998, the Maine Women's Hall of Fame in 2000, the National Track and Field Hall of Fame in 2004 and the USATF Masters Hall of Fame in 2014. In 2017, a plaque honoring her was unveiled in the L.A. Memorial Coliseum's Court of Honor.

In 2019, on the eve of the 40th anniversary of her first Boston Marathon win, Benoit and her daughter Abby ran together as they had done in previous marathons. Joan recorded a run time of 3:04:00, which was within 40 minutes of her original time which was a promise she had made prior to competing in that year's edition of the Boston Marathon. This allowed her to win her age group (60–64) by nearly nine minutes, but falling short of the overall (3:01:30) fastest time by a woman over 60 in a marathon.

== Marathoning achievements ==
- All results regarding marathon, unless stated otherwise

Year	Competition	Venue	Position	Notes
Representing the United States
1978	Bermuda Marathon	Bermuda	2nd	2:50:54
1979	Boston Marathon	Boston, United States	1st	2:35:15
1980	Auckland Marathon	Auckland, New Zealand	1st	2:31:23
1981	Boston Marathon	Boston, United States	3rd	2:30:17
1982	Nike OTC Marathon	Eugene, United States	1st	2:26:12
1983	Boston Marathon	Boston, United States	1st	2:22:43
1984	Summer Olympics	Los Angeles, United States	1st	2:24:52
1985	Chicago Marathon	Chicago, United States	1st	2:21:21
1988	New York City Marathon	New York City, United States	3rd	2:32:40
1991	Boston Marathon	Boston, United States	4th	2:26:54
1991	New York City Marathon	New York City, United States	6th	2:33:49
2013	Boston Marathon	Boston, United States	47th (overall); 1st (AG)	2:50:29
2019	Boston Marathon	Boston, United States	245th (overall); 1st (AG)	3:04:00

AG = Samuelson is credited with winning her age group at the 2013 and 2019 Boston Marathon. The 2013 race is the fastest marathon by a woman aged 55–59 but is not recognized by World Masters Athletics because Boston is not recognized under IAAF regulations as a world record qualifying marathon course.

Records
Preceded by (Norway) Grete Waitz	Women's marathon world record holder 18 April 1983 – 21 April 1985	Succeeded by (Norway) Ingrid Kristiansen
Preceded by (Netherlands) Marja Wokke (Norway) Grete Waitz	Women's Half marathon World record holder 18 January 1981 – 15 May 1982; 18 September 1983 – 9 March 1989	Succeeded by (Norway) Grete Waitz (Norway) Ingrid Kristiansen
