= Greater Boston Track Club =

The Greater Boston Track Club (usually abbreviated GBTC), a nonprofit organization, was started in 1973 by Jack McDonald in Boston, Massachusetts to provide coaching for runners looking to remain competitive beyond their collegiate running careers.

During the past 30 years, the club has provided coaching and support to Olympic qualifiers, Boston Marathon victors, national cross-country champions, and national and world championship participants. It has also offered runners of all ages and abilities the opportunity to achieve their personal and team goals.

== Sponsored events ==
- GBTC Indoor Track and Field Invitational – Annually held in January at Harvard Indoor Track, Cambridge, Massachusetts
- GBTC Cross-country Invitational – Annually held in September at Elm Bank Park, Wellesley, Massachusetts

== Notable alumni ==
List of notable Greater Boston Track Club athletes and coaches

- Ayanna Alexander
- Bruce Bickford
- Jack Fultz
- Samyr Lainé
- Greg Meyer
- Pete Pfitzinger
- Anna Pierce
- Bill Rodgers
- Alberto Salazar
- Bill Squires
