= Don Norman (runner) =

American middle-distance and long-distance runner

Don Norman (born 21 October 1958) is an American middle-distance and long-distance running athlete who was a winner or top finisher in multiple US marathons.

== Career ==
=== Notable races ===
He was the 1985 winner of Grandma's Marathon from Two Harbors, Minnesota to Duluth when he ran the second-fastest time of an American that year: 2:11:08.

A few months later, with a sponsorship from New Balance, he ran the New York Marathon, he battled with Orlando Pizzolato, Hussein Ahmed Salah and Pat Petersen to finish fourth, netting the 27-year-old $15,000 in prize winnings.

In 1985, he was fourth in the Sydney Marathon in Australia. He also finished second in the Old Kent River Bank Run 25K with a 1:18:18. Norman was also the winner of the Charlotte Observer Marathon (1984), the Charleston Distance Run (1986, beating out Bill Rodgers, and 1988), and the Johnstown Marathon (1999) in Pennsylvania.

Norman ran the Olympic Trials Marathon in 1988. He had run the previous trials race (in 1984), but had dropped out. In his return to the trials, he stayed in, kept with the leaders, and finished sixth. The same year, he was a top finisher at the Cherry Blossom Ten Mile Run.

=== Advocacy for the Pittsburgh Marathon ===
After several top finishes at the Pittsburgh Marathon, Norman, a native Pennsylvanian, was dismayed to see the race fall on hard times and disappear. In the late 2000s he helped lead a group of organizers and who brought the race back to life.
