= Dick Beardsley =

American long-distance runner

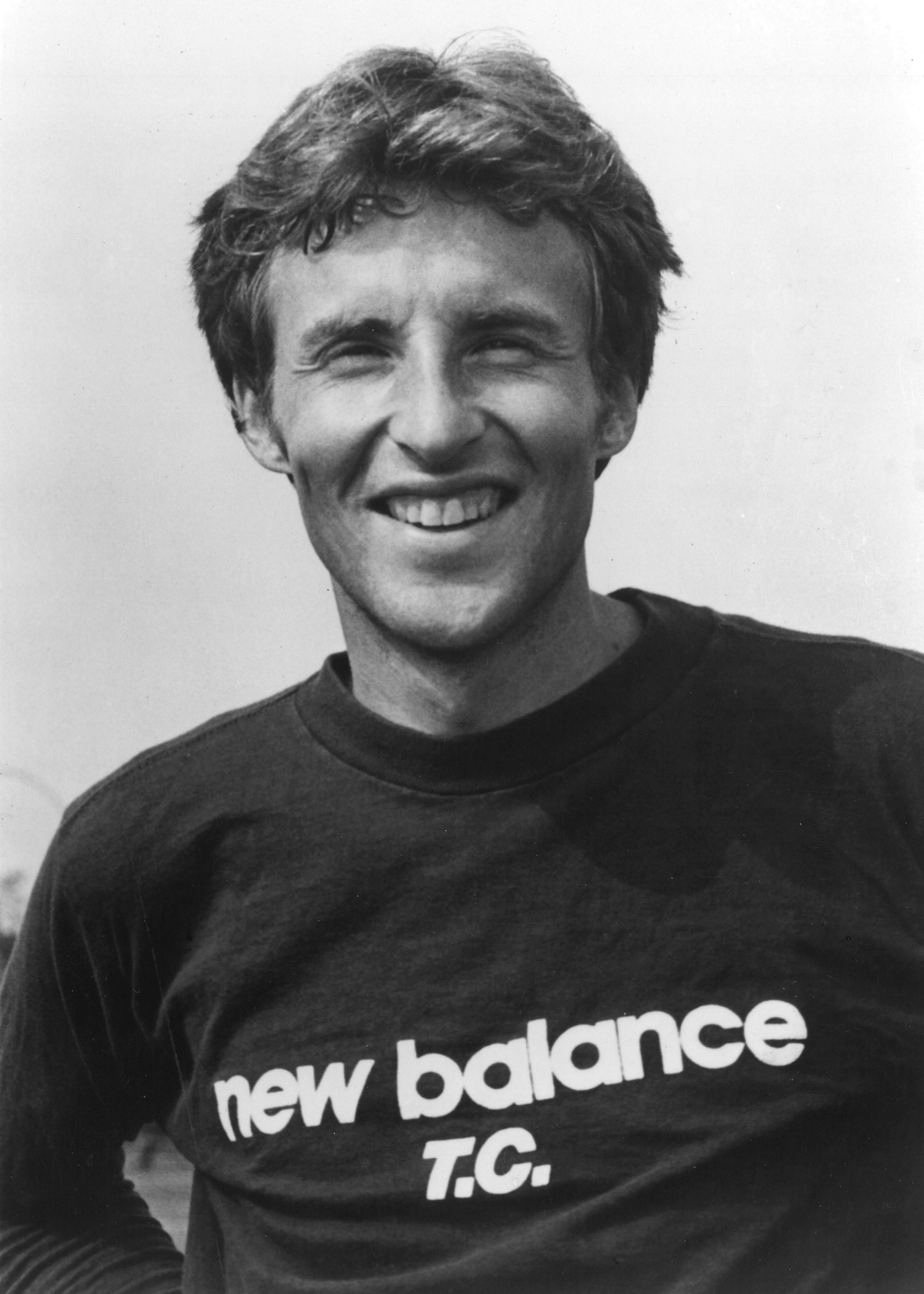
- Born: March 21, 1956 (age 69); Minneapolis, Minnesota, U.S.
- Occupation: Long-distance runner
- Website: dickbeardsley.com

Dick Beardsley (born March 21, 1956) is an American long-distance runner. He tied for first place with Inge Simonsen in the inaugural 1981 London Marathon and finished second to Alberto Salazar by one second in the 1982 Boston Marathon.

== Running career ==
Beardsley ran his first marathon in 2:47:14 at the 1977 Paavo Nurmi Marathon in Hurley, Wisconsin. In subsequent marathons, he steadily lowered his times: 2:33:22, 2:33:06, and 2:31:50. Beardsley is the only man to have ever run 13 consecutive personal bests in the marathon, and is in the Guinness Book of World Records for the feat.

In 1981 he and Norwegian Inge Simonsen intentionally crossed the finish line together holding hands in a time of 2:11:48. According to Beardsley, "It was a big deal for both of us because neither one of us had won a marathon before."

His finish time of 2:09:37 at the 1981 Grandma's Marathon stood as a course record for 33 years until it was broken in 2014. Beardsley placed second (2:08:53) on the heels of Alberto Salazar in the 1982 Boston Marathon, breaking the Boston Marathon course record and the American record.

In 2003 he started the Dick Beardsley Marathon Running Camp, which used to be held each September at Rainbow Resort in Waubun, Minnesota, but which are now held at Lake Bemidji, Minnesota.

Beardsley is one of the subjects of the book Duel in the Sun, published in 2006 by John Brant. His memoir, Staying the Course: A Runner's Toughest Race, was co-authored by Maureen Anderson and published in 2002 by the University of Minnesota Press.

In 2007, Beardsley was featured in the documentary movie Spirit of the Marathon.

In 2010, Beardsley was inducted into the National Distance Running Hall of Fame.

Year	Competition	Venue	Position	Notes
Representing the United States
1981	London Marathon	London, United Kingdom	1st	2:11:48
1981	Grandma's Marathon	Duluth, United States	1st	2:09:37
1982	Grandma's Marathon	Duluth, United States	1st	2:14:50
1982	Boston Marathon	Boston, United States	2nd	2:08:53

== Drug addiction ==
In November 1989, Beardsley nearly died in a farm mishap; he required five months to recuperate. Between July 1992 and February 1993, he was involved in three serious automobile accidents, each requiring hospitalization for back and neck injuries. While on a hike, he was hurt after falling down an embankment when the path collapsed. He underwent three back operations in 1994 and knee surgery in 1995.

After each of his injuries, Beardsley was prescribed medication for the pain. Over four years, he developed an addiction to the medication. He was arrested September 30, 1996, for forging prescriptions and sentenced to five years' probation and 460 hours of community service. Beardsley spent nine days in a psychiatric unit where he was prescribed methadone. He was released for outpatient treatment, returned to inpatient treatment where he quit methadone, and again began outpatient treatment. His first day of chemical-free sobriety was February 12, 1997.

Beardsley started the Dick Beardsley Foundation in October 2007 to provide assistance to individuals suffering from chemical dependency who are unable to pay for a 12-step treatment program. The foundation's goals are to educate the general public about chemical dependency. It allows Beardsley to speak about his own experience in overcoming addiction.

== Personal life ==
Beardsley married Mary in 1979. They adopted one son, Andrew. They later divorced and Beardsley moved to Austin, Texas in 2007 and remarried. In August 2010, it was reported that Beardsley and his wife had filed for bankruptcy. Beardsley's wife Jill said that they filed to consolidate Internal Revenue Service debt.

In 2023, Beardsley started a podcast with his friend and fellow marathon runner Mike Dunlap, called On The Run With Beards And Dun.
