= 1988 Boston Marathon =

Footrace in Boston, Massachusetts, USA

- Venue: Boston, United States
- Dates: April 18

Champions
- Men: Ibrahim Hussein (2:08:43)
- Women: Rosa Mota (2:24:30)
- Wheelchair men: Mustapha Badid (1:43:19)
- Wheelchair women: Candace Cable (2:10:44)

The 1988 Boston Marathon was the 92nd running of the annual marathon race in Boston, United States, which was held on April 18. The elite men's race was won by Kenya's Ibrahim Hussein in a time of 2:08:43 hours and the women's race was won by Portugal's Rosa Mota in 2:24:30. In the wheelchair race, Mustapha Badid of France won the men's race in 1:43:19 and Candace Cable of United States won the women's race in 2:10:44.

A total of 5261 runners finished the race, 4472 men and 789 women.

== Results ==
=== Men ===
Position	Athlete	Nationality	Time
1st place, gold medalist(s)	Ibrahim Hussein	Kenya	2:08:43
2nd place, silver medalist(s)	Juma Ikangaa	Tanzania	2:08:44
3rd place, bronze medalist(s)	John Treacy	Ireland	2:09:15
4	Gelindo Bordin	Italy	2:09:27
5	Gianni Poli	Italy	2:09:33
6	John Campbell	New Zealand	2:11:08
7	Orlando Pizzolato	Italy	2:12:32
8	John Makanya	Tanzania	2:14:04
9	Steve Jones	United Kingdom	2:14:07
10	Tomoyuki Taniguchi	Japan	2:14:18
11	Zakariah Barie	Tanzania	2:14:32
12	Hideki Kita	Japan	2:14:40
13	Joseph Kipsang	Kenya	2:15:05
14	Michael O'Reilly	United Kingdom	2:15:27
15	Ahmet Altun	Turkey	2:15:48
16	Jean-Michel Charbonnel	France	2:15:58
17	Vesa Kähkölä	Finland	2:16:17
18	Geoffrey Smith	United Kingdom	2:16:34
19	Jean-Yves Madelon	France	2:16:42
20	John Burra	Tanzania	2:17:11
22	Tommy Ekblom	Finland	2:17:34
23	Roger Soler	Peru	2:17:46
24	Silvio Salazar	Colombia	2:17:49
25	Ryszard Marczak	Poland	2:17:53

=== Women ===
Position	Athlete	Nationality	Time
1st place, gold medalist(s)	Rosa Mota	Portugal	2:24:30
2nd place, silver medalist(s)	Tuija Toivonen	Finland	2:29:26
3rd place, bronze medalist(s)	Odette Lapierre	Canada	2:30:35
4	Priscilla Welch	United Kingdom	2:30:48
5	Lizanne Bussières	Canada	2:30:57
6	Ellen Rochefort	Canada	2:31:36
7	Sinikka Keskitalo	Finland	2:34:12
8	Sirkku Kumpulainen	Finland	2:35:24
9	Susan Stone	Canada	2:38:48
10	Gillian Beschloss	United Kingdom	2:40:08
11	Angella Hearn	United Kingdom	2:40:15
12	Gillian Horovitz	United Kingdom	2:40:26
13	Ritva Lemettinen	Finland	2:41:58
14	Marjaana Lahti-Koski	Finland	2:42:57
15	Kirsi Rauta	Finland	2:43:54
16	El-Hassania Darami	Morocco	2:44:29
17	Gloria Corona	Mexico	2:45:40
18	Lise Bouchard	Canada	2:46:02
19	Louise Mohanna	United States	2:46:09
20	Christine Iwahashi	United States	2:48:57

=== Wheelchair men ===
Position	Athlete	Nationality	Time
1st place, gold medalist(s)	Mustapha Badid	France	1:43:19
2nd place, silver medalist(s)	Philippe Couprie	France	1:54:58
3rd place, bronze medalist(s)	Bosse Lindquist	Sweden	1:56:58
4	Scott Patterson	United States	1:57:22
5	Markus Pilz	Germany	1:58:40
6	Marty Vogel	United States	2:00:20
7	André Viger	Canada	2:00:49
8	Robert Molinatti	United States	2:01:34
9	Tim O'Connell	United States	2:02:06
10	Bart Bardwell	United States	2:02:37

=== Wheelchair women ===
Position	Athlete	Nationality	Time
1st place, gold medalist(s)	Candace Cable	United States	2:10:44
2nd place, silver medalist(s)	Sharon Frenette	United States	2:30:17
3rd place, bronze medalist(s)	Mary Thompson	United States	2:59:57
