= Susan Stone (athlete) =

Pioneering long-distance runner from Canada

Susan K. Stone (b. Aug. 29, 1960) is a former Canadian athlete who competed in middle and long distance races. She became the Canadian National Champion in the 10K in 1988 after only beginning to run in 1983.

Stone became a prominent runner along with international competitors Zhong Huandi, Marguerite Buist, Ellen Rochefort, Sissel Grottenberg, and Odette Lapierre. She was ninth at the 1988 Boston Marathon, 7th at the 1986 Osaka Women's Marathon (in Japan), 13th at the 1987 London Marathon, 13th at the 1986 New York City Marathon and 13th at the 1985 Chicago Marathon. Stone was selected for the Canadian team at the 1987 World Championship Marathon and the 1989 World Cross Country Championships.

She is the winner of the 1985 and 1987 Around the Bay Road Race, the 1986 and 1988 Subaru 4-Mile Chase (in Buffalo, New York), the 1985 Grandma's Marathon, the 1988 Toronto Marathon, the 1984 Avon Women's NYC Half Marathon, and was second at the 1984 Marine Corps Marathon. She continued to run and compete in age categories (masters) after taking time off to further her teaching career and to raise a family.

== Achievements ==
Year	Competition	Venue	Position	Event	Notes
Representing Canada
1989	Chicago Marathon	Chicago, Illinois	16th	Marathon	2:45:47
1989	World Cross Country Championships	Stavanger, Norway	30th	6K	23:47
1988	Toronto Marathon	Toronto, Canada	1st	Marathon	2:40:38
1988	Boston Marathon	Boston, Massachusetts	9th	Marathon	2:38:48
1988	Canadian Championships	Toronto, Canada	1st	10K	33:56
1987	Around the Bay Road Race	Hamilton, Canada	1st	30K	1:51:37
1987	World Championships	Rome, Italy	DNF	Marathon	n/a
1987	London Marathon	London, England	13th	Marathon	2:37:16
1986	New York City Marathon	New York, New York	13th	Marathon	2:39:05
1985	Chicago Marathon	Chicago, Illinois	13th	Marathon	2:38:48
1985	Grandma's Marathon	Duluth, Minnesota	1st	Marathon	2:39:45
1985	Around the Bay Road Race	Hamilton, Canada	1st	30K	1:53:23
1984	Marine Corps Marathon	Washington, DC	2nd	Marathon	2:45:47
1984	Avon Women's Half Marathon	New York, New York	1st	Half Marathon	1:17:15

== See also ==
- Canadian records in track and field
- Susan Stone at World Athletics
