= 1987 Boston Marathon =

Footrace in Boston, Massachusetts, USA

- Venue: Boston, United States
- Dates: April 20

Champions
- Men: Toshihiko Seko (2:11:50)
- Women: Rosa Mota (2:25:21)
- Wheelchair men: André Viger (1:55:42)
- Wheelchair women: Candace Cable (2:19:55)

The 1987 Boston Marathon was the 91st running of the annual marathon race in Boston, United States, which was held on April 20. The elite men's race was won by Japan's Toshihiko Seko in a time of 2:11:50 hours and the women's race was won by Portugal's Rosa Mota in 2:25:21. In the wheelchair race, André Viger of Canada won the men's race in 1:55:42 and Candace Cable of United States won the women's race in 2:19:55. Sinclair Warner of the United States won the men's visually impaired race in a time of 2:51:22.

A total of 5369 runners finished the race, 4576 men and 793 women.

== Results ==
=== Men ===
Position	Athlete	Nationality	Time
1st place, gold medalist(s)	Toshihiko Seko	Japan	2:11:50
2nd place, silver medalist(s)	Steve Jones	United Kingdom	2:12:37
3rd place, bronze medalist(s)	Geoff Smith	United Kingdom	2:12:42
4	David Gordon	United States	2:13:30
5	Tomoyuki Taniguchi	Japan	2:13:40
6	Robert de Castella	Australia	2:14:24
7	Dirk Vanderherten	Belgium	2:15:02
8	Eddy Hellebuyck	Belgium	2:15:16
9	Hideki Kita	Japan	2:15:23
10	Ken Martin	United States	2:15:41
11	Juma Ikangaa	Tanzania	2:16:17
12	Abraha Arega	Ethiopia	2:16:23
13	Richard Umberg	Switzerland	2:17:01
14	John Treacy	Ireland	2:17:50
15	Bill Rodgers	United States	2:18:18
16	Jean-Jacques Padel	France	2:18:49
17	Bruce Bickford	United States	2:18:57
18	Yoji Takahashi	Japan	2:19:03
19	Ed Eyestone	United States	2:19:19
20	Robert Yara	United States	2:20:19
21	Kari Suominen	Finland	2:21:10
22	Domingo Tibaduiza	Colombia	2:21:35
23	Gary Fanelli	United States	2:21:36
24	David J Clark	United Kingdom	2:21:37
25	Bob Clifford	United States	2:21:40

=== Women ===
Position	Athlete	Nationality	Time
1st place, gold medalist(s)	Rosa Mota	Portugal	2:25:21
2nd place, silver medalist(s)	Agnes Pardaens	Belgium	2:29:50
3rd place, bronze medalist(s)	Ria Van Landeghem	Belgium	2:29:56
4	Odette Lapierre	Canada	2:31:33
5	Sinikka Keskitalo	Finland	2:33:58
6	Evy Palm	Sweden	2:36:24
7	Ellen Rochefort	Canada	2:36:42
8	Leatrice Hayer	United States	2:37:58
9	Jacqueline Gareau	Canada	2:40:40
10	Lisa Rainsberger	United States	2:43:06
11	Ena Guevara	Peru	2:44:38
12	Tuija Toivonen	Finland	2:44:39
13	Nancy Corsaro	United States	2:46:10
14	Christina Skarvelis	United States	2:46:52
15	Christine Iwahashi	United States	2:49:42
16	Kimberly Moody	United States	2:49:46
17	Ann Wehner	United States	2:50:21
18	Lynn Dobkowski	United States	2:52:31
19	Cheryl Boessow	United States	2:52:43
20	Claudia Ciavarella	United States	2:54:02
21	Kathy Culla	United States	2:54:03
22	Rejane Plante	Canada	2:54:14
23	Christine Gibbons	United States	2:54:22
24	Jane Hutchison	United States	2:55:04
25	Louise Mohanna	Canada	2:55:38

=== Wheelchair men ===
Position	Athlete	Nationality	Time
1st place, gold medalist(s)	André Viger	Canada	1:55:42
2nd place, silver medalist(s)	Jim Martinson	United States	2:02:36
3rd place, bronze medalist(s)	Thomas Foran	United States	2:03:10
4	Philippe Couprie	France	2:03:11
5	Yukifumi Yamamoto	Japan	2:03:13
6	Jean Francois Poitevin	France	2:05:04
7	Farid Amarouche	France	2:05:09
8	Marty Ball	United States	2:06:58
9	Robert Molinatti	United States	2:08:11
10	Greg Gibbons	United States	2:08:18

=== Wheelchair women ===
Position	Athlete	Nationality	Time
1st place, gold medalist(s)	Candace Cable	United States	2:19:55
2nd place, silver medalist(s)	Sherry Ramsey	United States	2:27:54
3rd place, bronze medalist(s)	Brenda Zajac	United States	2:53:34
4	Mary Thompson	United States	3:08:41
