= York Boulevard =

Road in Hamilton, Ontario, Canada

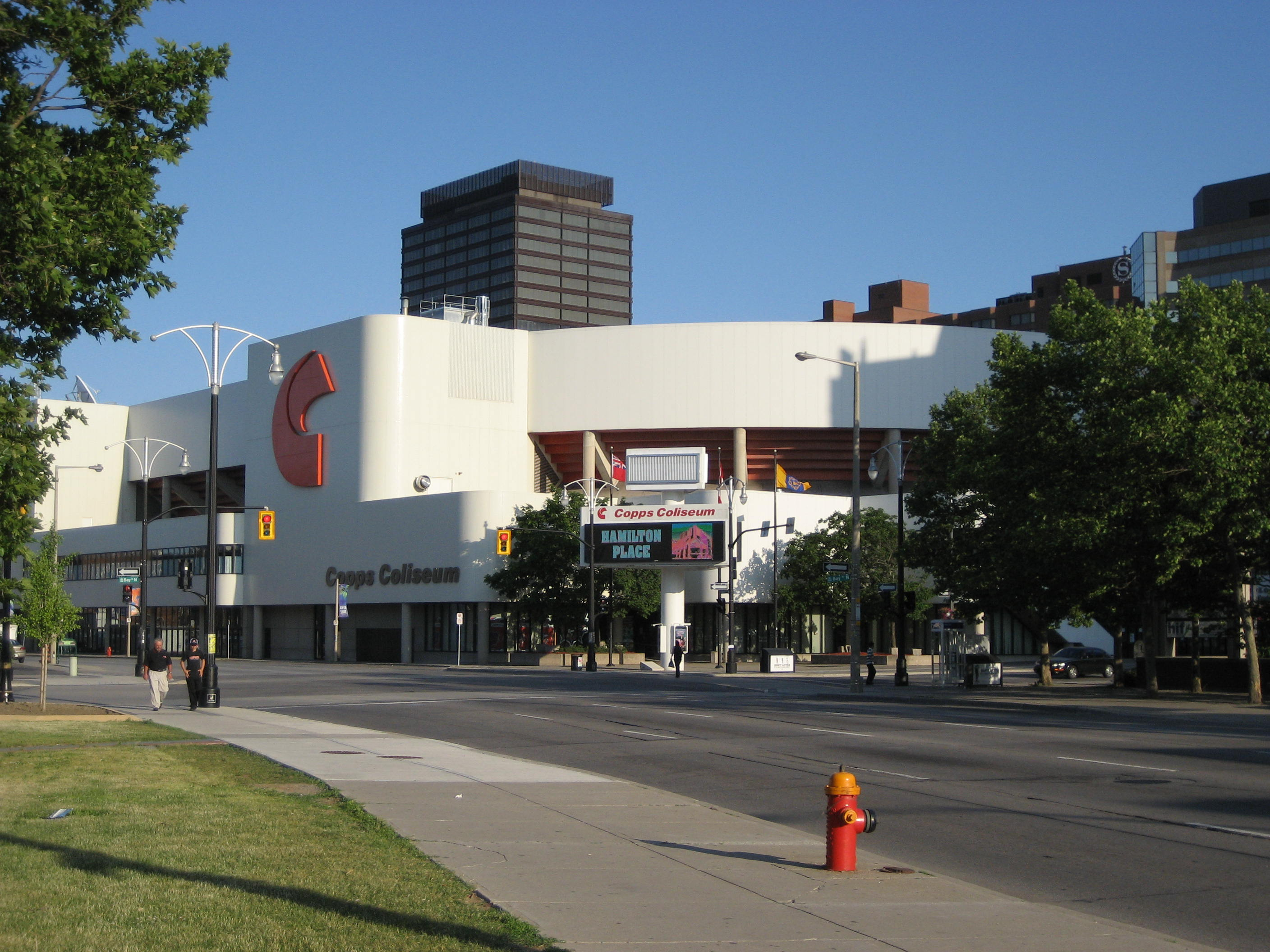
York Boulevard, looking east in downtown.

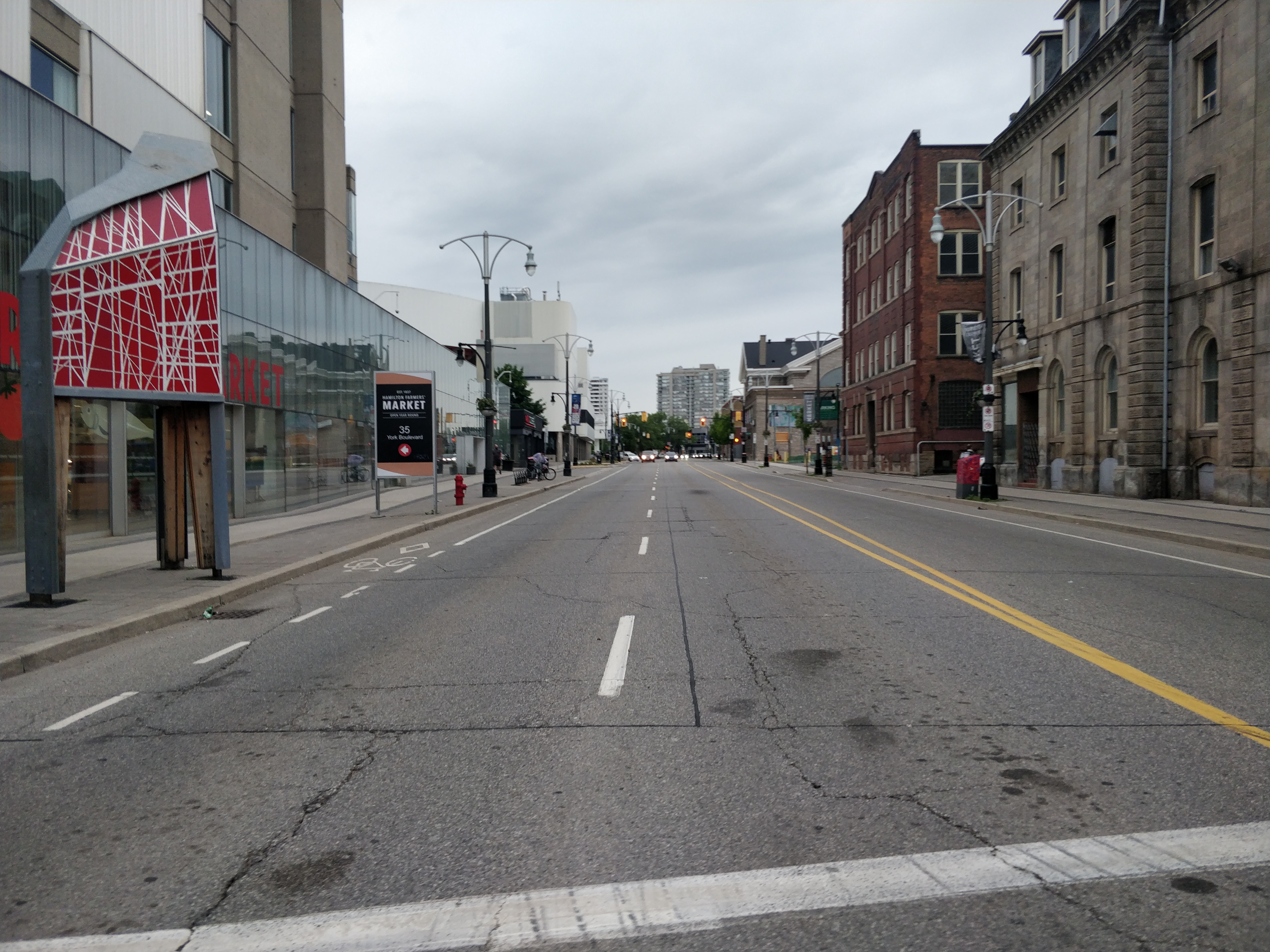
York Boulevard, looking west from downtown.

York Boulevard is a Lower City arterial road in Hamilton, Ontario, Canada. Formerly known as Highway 2 and Highway 6, it starts in Burlington, Ontario, at Plains Road West as a two-way arterial road that wraps around and over Hamilton Harbour, enters the city of Hamilton in the west end at Dundurn Park, and ends at James Street North. It has a one-way section from Queen Street to Bay Street North, and continues east of James Street North as Wilson Street.)

== History ==
York Boulevard was part of the military road that connected the chain stations lying between Kingston and the Niagara River, and was the used as the main road to York, Upper Canada (present-day Toronto). As a result, it became known as York Street. In 1976, the road was closed for construction, over the protests of residents and businesspeople, widened and redesignated York Boulevard on November 29, 1976, at a final cost of $5.5-million.

No street runs parallel with York Boulevard. George Hamilton, a settler and local politician, established a town site in the northern part of Barton Township after the war in 1815. He kept several east–west roads which were originally Indian trails, although the north–south streets were on a regular grid pattern. Streets were designated "East" or "West" if they crossed James Street or Highway 6, and "North" or "South" if they crossed King Street or Highway 8. York Street was originally one of those Indian trails; it runs along a ridge of elevated ground (a former sandbar), cutting through the Strathcona and Central neighbourhoods diagonally.

In 1857, 57 passengers were killed when a train derailed near the Desjardins Canal.

The old City Hall, with its 38-metre clock tower, was demolished in 1961 (corner of York and James Street) to allow expansion of Eaton's department store. The clock and bell went into the tower of the 1990 Eaton Centre. Hamilton's Central Library was opened in 1980 by Prince Philip. TD Coliseum, a sports and entertainment arena with a capacity of up to 19,000 (depending on event type and configuration) opened its doors for business in 1985. It was originally named Copps Coliseum after the former Hamilton mayor, Victor K. Copps, and was renamed in 2014.

As part of the Hamilton master transportation plan, York Boulevard was converted from a one way street to allow two-way traffic. This change came into effect at 10 am on December 10, 2010.

=== Parks ===
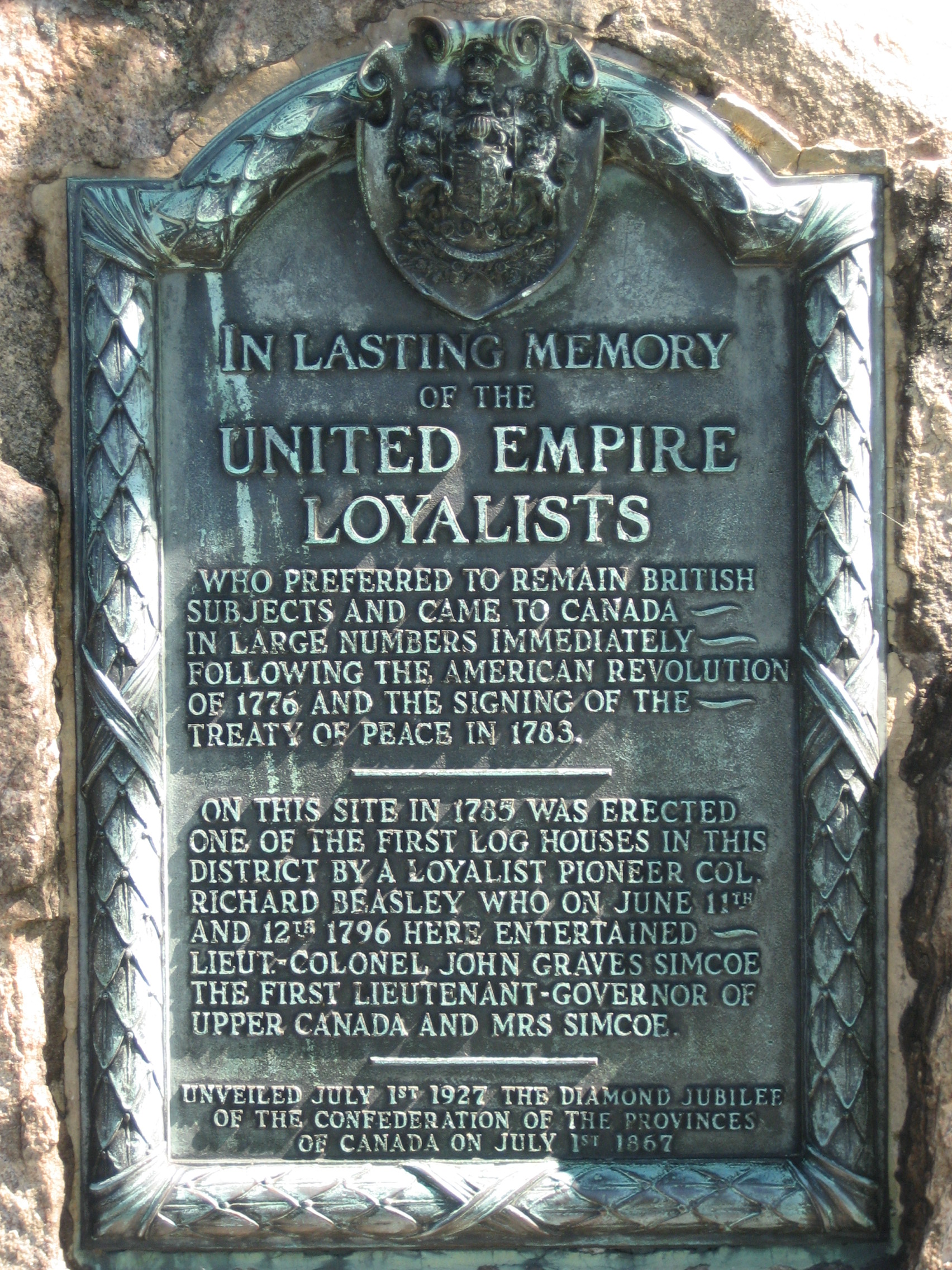
Dundurn Park Loyalists marker

In 1790, Richard Beasley occupied Burlington Heights (now the site of Dundurn Park and Harvey Park) and was granted land by the Crown in 1799. A local entrepreneur, Beasley's business ventures included fur trading, land acquisition and establishment of a grist mill in Ancaster. He was a member of the legislative assembly of Upper Canada from 1791 to 1804 and was appointed colonel of the 2nd regiment of the York militia in 1809. Financial difficulties forced Beasley to sell lands at Burlington Heights, but they were purchased in 1832 by Sir Allan Napier MacNab who built Dundurn Castle on the foundations of Beasley's brick home. Richard Beasley was a United Empire Loyalist who preferred to stay British and came to Canada following the American Revolution of 1776.

Sir Allan Napier MacNab, (1798–1862), was a businessman, land speculator and soldier, and was active in public life. He was a successful lawyer and was appointed Upper Canada's first Queen's Council. In 1838 he was knighted for his role in suppressing the rebellion of Upper Canada. The profits from his extensive land speculation were fed into a variety of projects, including construction of his monument, Dundurn. He was influential in establishing the Gore Bank and in promoting the Great Western Railway. During a political career spanning three decades, he was three times Speaker and, from 1854 to 1856 Joint Premier of the Province of Canada.

Dundurn Castle was built between 1832 and 1835 for Sir Allan Napier MacNab, and named after his family ancestral seat in Scotland. Incorporating an existing farmhouse, it was designed by local architect Robert Wetherell as a statement of its owner's place in society. The house features classical and Italian motifs, French windows, broad verandahs, and a panoramic view of Burlington Bay. With its outbuildings and grounds, Dundurn Castle stands as an important example of the Picturesque movement in Canada. After years in private hands, the property was purchased by the city and from 1964 to 1967 was restored to its former splendour.

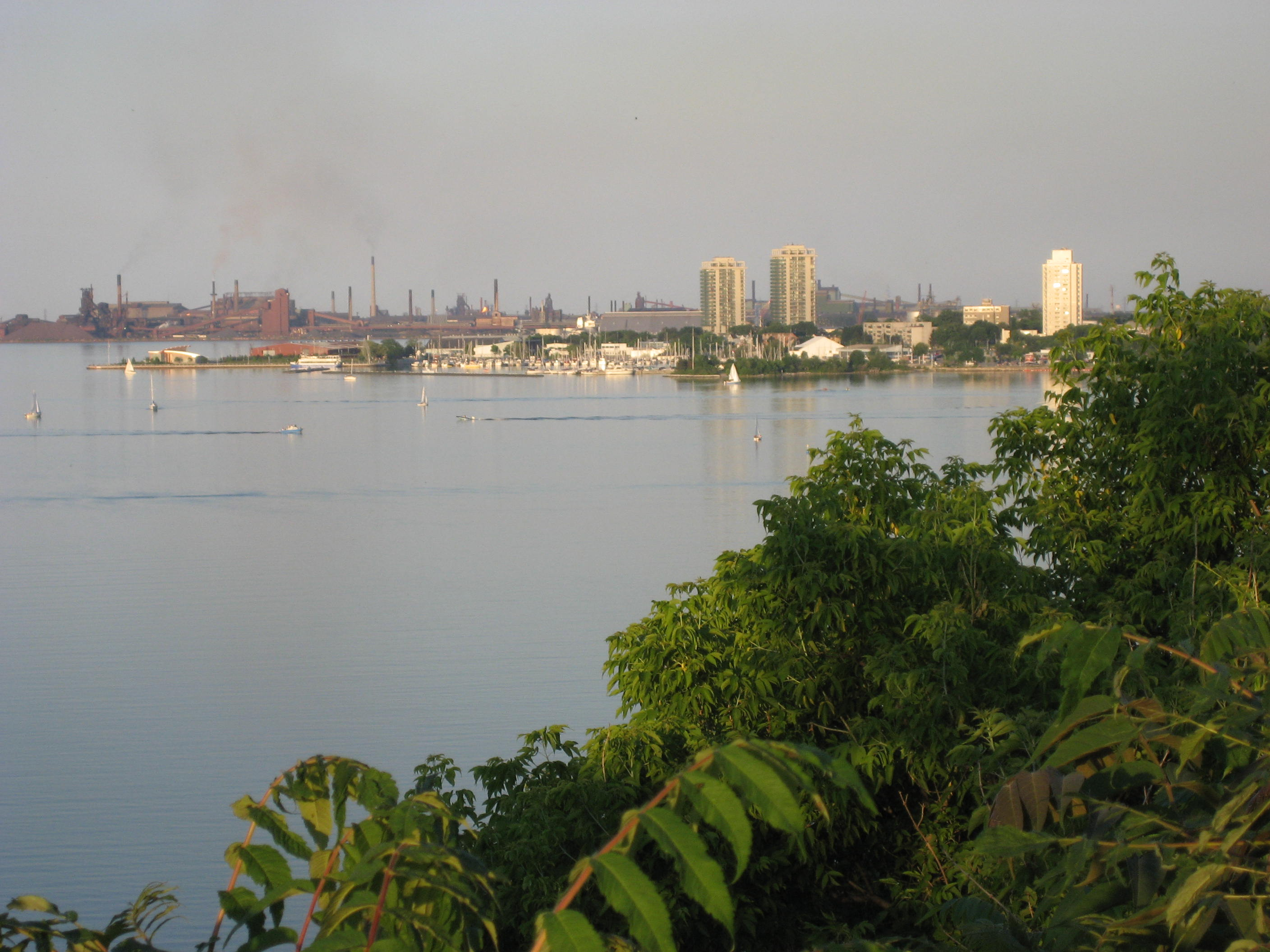
Hamilton Harbour, view from Harvey Park, just West of Dundurn Park

Harvey Park was named after Colonel John Harvey, a British officer during the War of 1812. The name was accepted by Hamilton City Council June 11, 1894. From Harvey Park Lieutenant-Colonel John Harvey set out with about 700 men on the night of June 5, 1813, to launch a surprise attack on an invading United States force of some 3,000 men camped in Stoney Creek. His rout of the troops commanded by Brigadier-General John Chandler under cover of darkness in the early hours of June 6 is generally credited with saving Upper Canada from being overrun by the enemy. Harvey was knighted in 1824, served as Lieutenant-Governor of New Brunswick (1834–1841), Lieutenant-Governor of Newfoundland (1841–1846), and Lieutenant-Governor of Nova Scotia (1846-18851).

Cootes Paradise is a haven for naturalists. Close to the downtown, this sanctuary provides an undisturbed refuge for birds, fish and animals of all types and can be reached from York Boulevard by following the Harvey Park Trail west and descending the stairs at the Thomas B. McQuesten High Level Bridge.

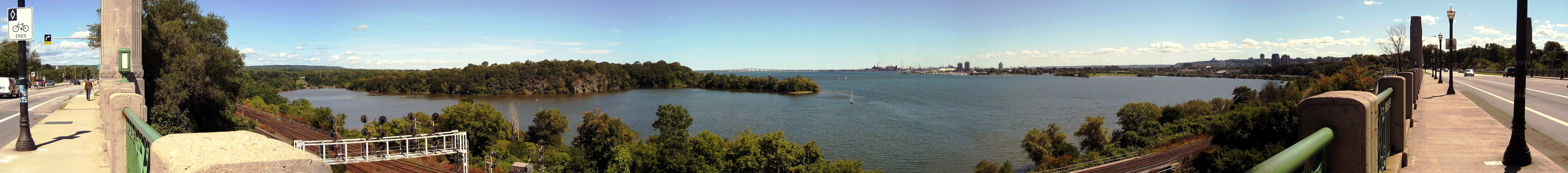
Panoramic view of Hamilton Harbour from T.B. McQuesten High Level Bridge on York Boulevard, near Harvey Park.

=== Festivals and events ===
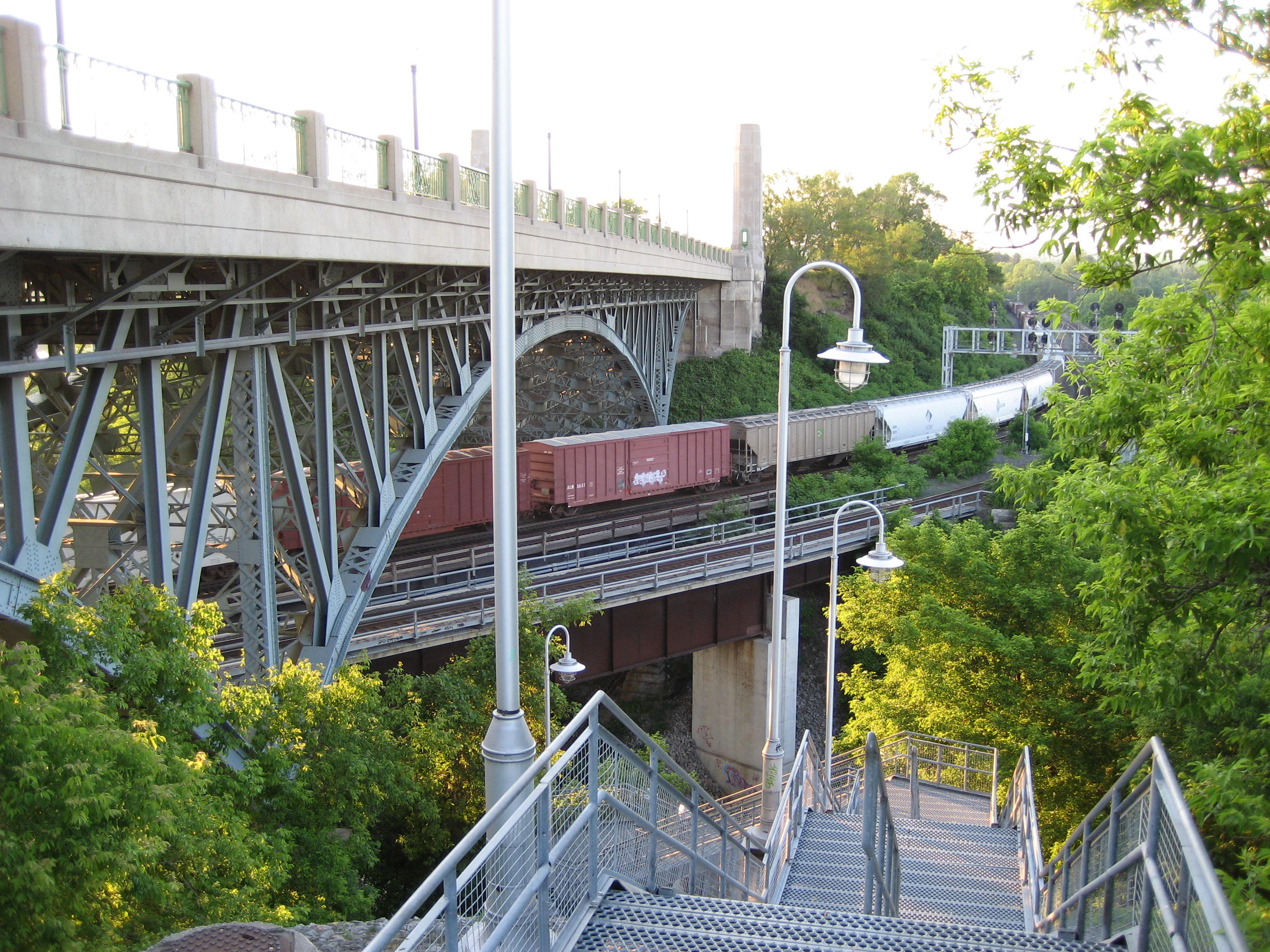
Stairway, T.B. McQuesten high level bridge, leading down to Waterfront Trail.

The Around the Bay Road Race is the oldest long-distance road race in North America, held annually in Hamilton, Ontario, since 1894, three years before the Boston Marathon. This 30-kilometre race is also known as the Billy Sherring Memorial Road Race. All races start on York Boulevard, one block west of TD Coliseum, and finish inside TD Coliseum. On Sunday, March 30, 2008, a record 8,500 participants crossed the finish line.

The City's Parks Board drew up plans in 1927 for the construction of a full-scale botanical gardens. By 1930 work had started on the project which converted an ugly stone quarry into a horticultural showcase, known as the Royal Botanical Gardens. A decade later a bill was introduced in the Provincial Legislature calling for an even more ambitious project which when completed would become the "Mecca of flower lovers from all parts of North America" its supporters claimed. The sponsor of the legislation was the Minister of Highways in the Provincial Government, and native Hamiltonian, T.B. McQuesten.

The Royal Botanical Gardens was established as an independent entity in 1941 by an act of the provincial government, but the project traces its origins to the late 1920s when the City of Hamilton began acquiring land for the beautification of the city's northwest entrance. Breathtaking gardens and spectacular nature sanctuaries plus three on-site restaurants and gift shop, over 30 kilometres of nature trails, and more can be found here. The Royal Botanical Gardens also plays host to a number of festivals throughout the year. Some of these include the Tulip Celebration, Lilac Celebration, Iris Festival, Rose Celebration and Music @ the Gardens. In addition to the festivals, hundreds of educational programs are offered for all ages as well as day camps for children.

== Waterfront Shuttle ==
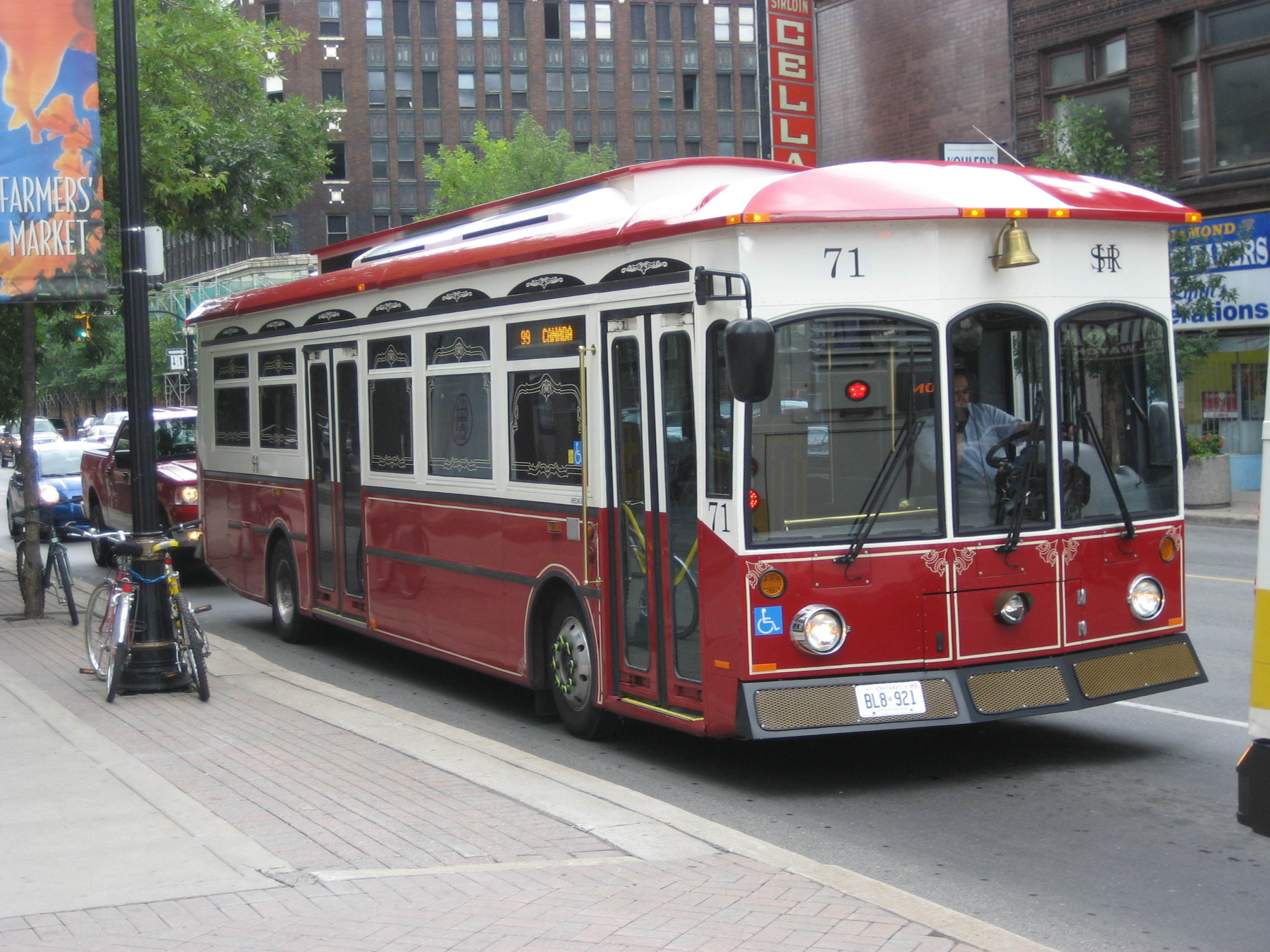
Waterfront Shuttle

The Waterfront Shuttle is a free service offered by the Hamilton Street Railway. It has a seasonal schedule that runs daily from late June to early September connecting Hamilton's downtown core to the waterfront and attractions that can be found there, such as HMCS Haida, Bayfront Park, Pier 4 Park, and the Hamilton Waterfront Outdoor Rink. The bus leaves the loop point on King Street West opposite Summers Lane and circles Hamilton's downtown core on Bay Street North, York Boulevard, and James Street North, where it travels through the Art District until it reaches the waterfront at Guise Street and passes the Royal Hamilton Yacht Club, Hamilton Chamber of Commerce and the Harbour West Marina Complex, ending on Discovery Drive at Pier 8. Also at this site is the Hamilton Harbour Queen (cruise boat), Hamiltonian (tour boat) and the Hamilton Waterfront Trolley.

== Gallery ==
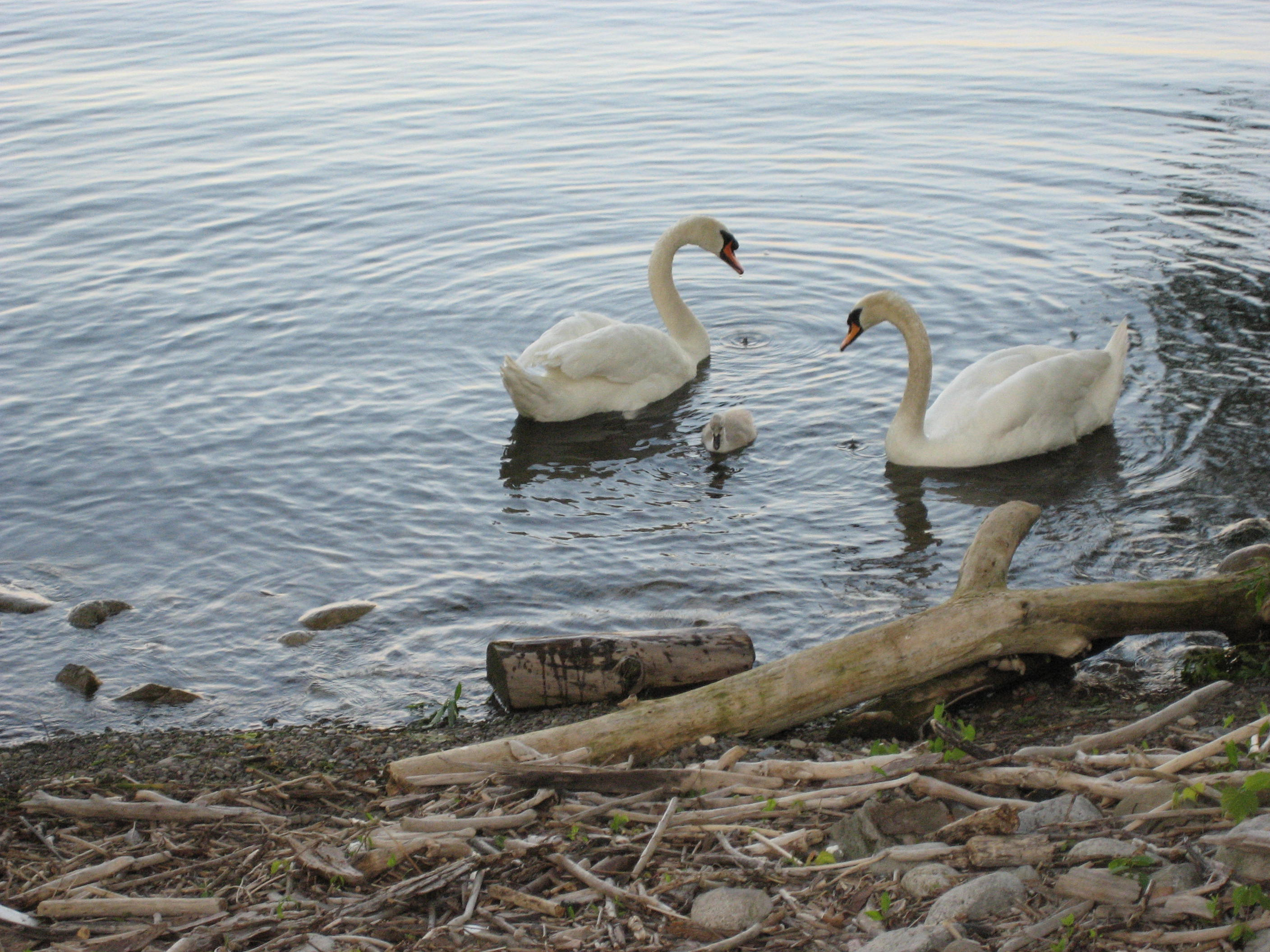
Swans swimming in Cootes Paradise

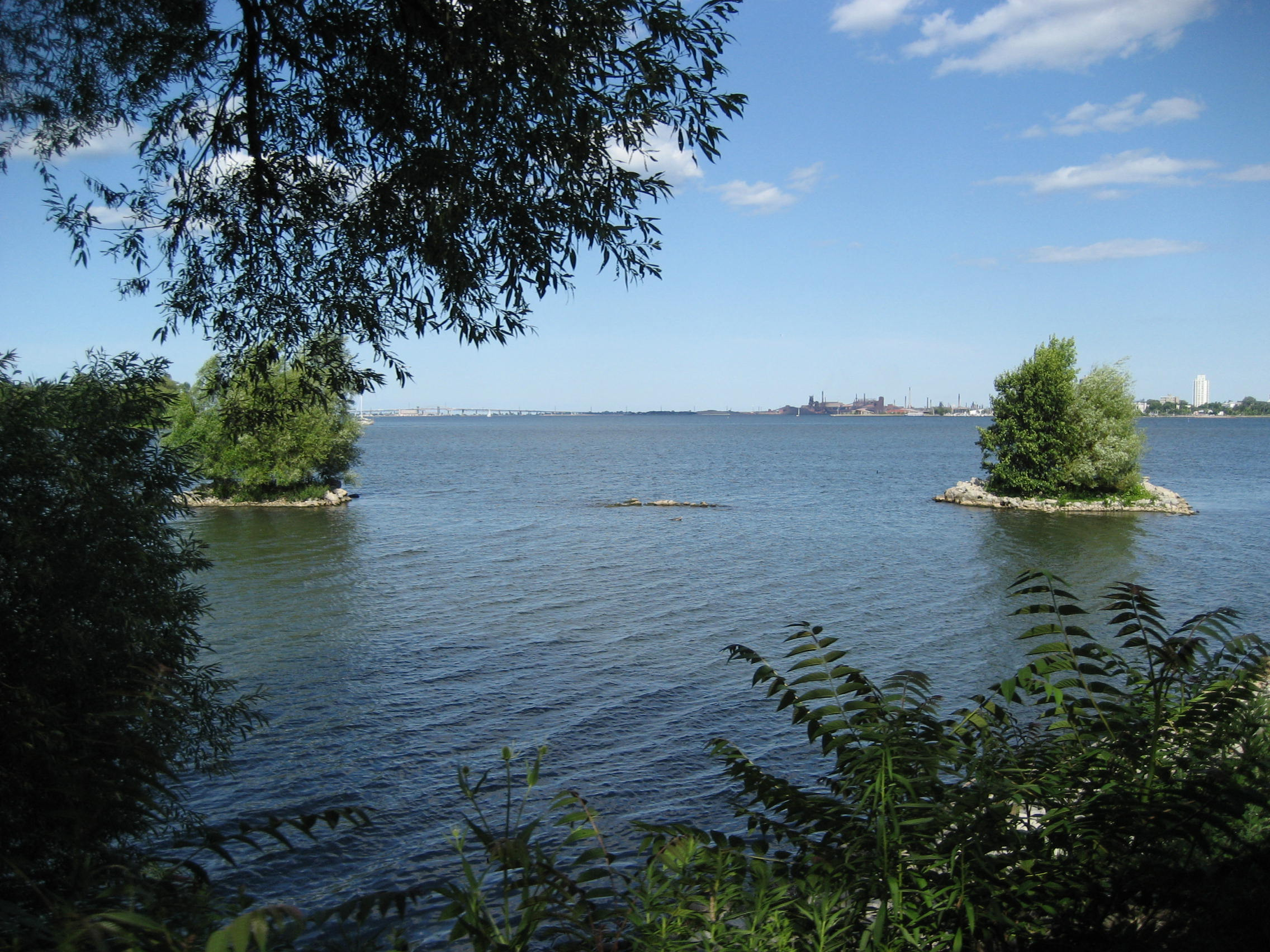
Waterfront Trail, man-made islands, home to many Canada geese and swans.

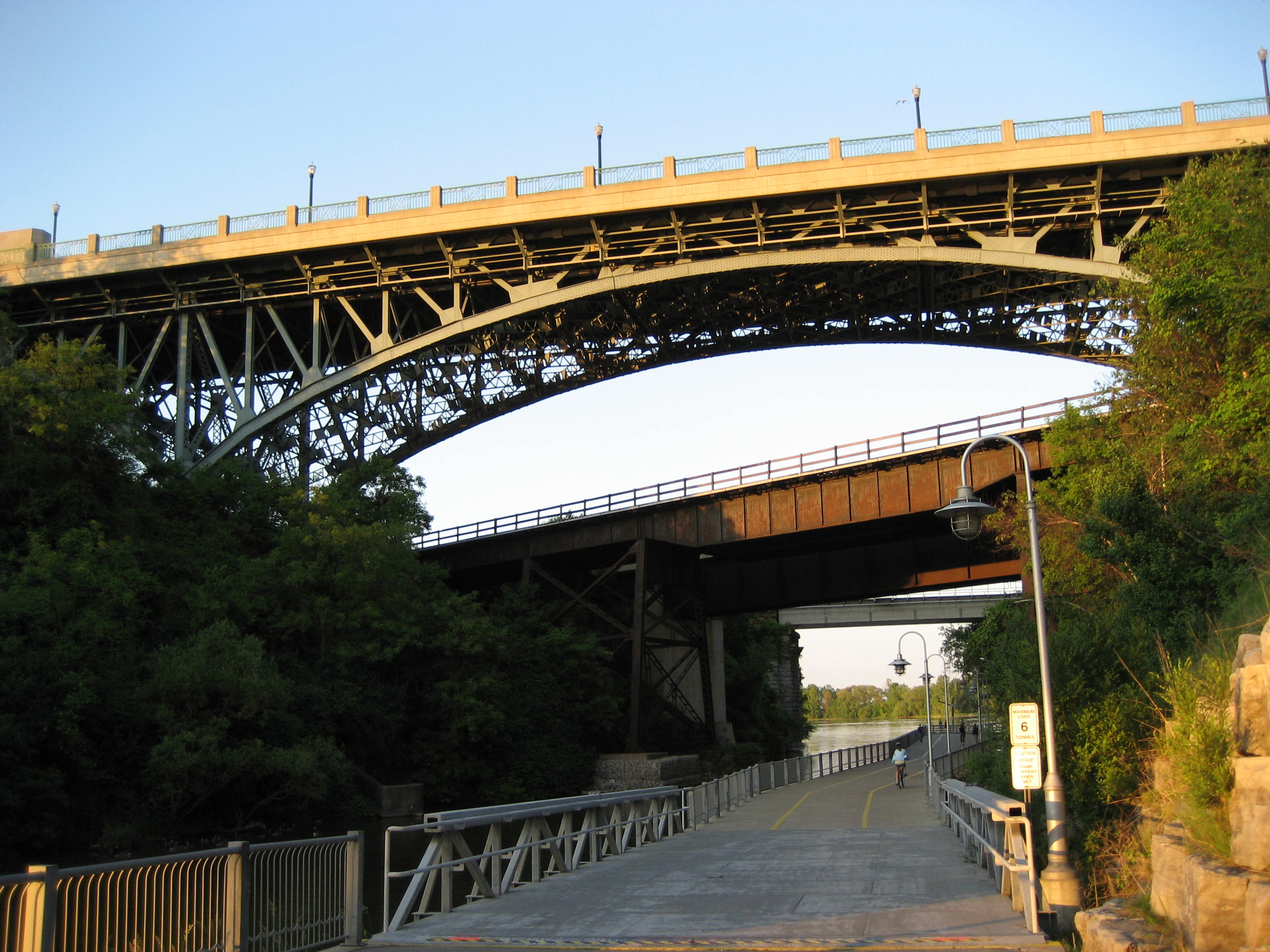
High Level Bridge, view from Waterfront Trail

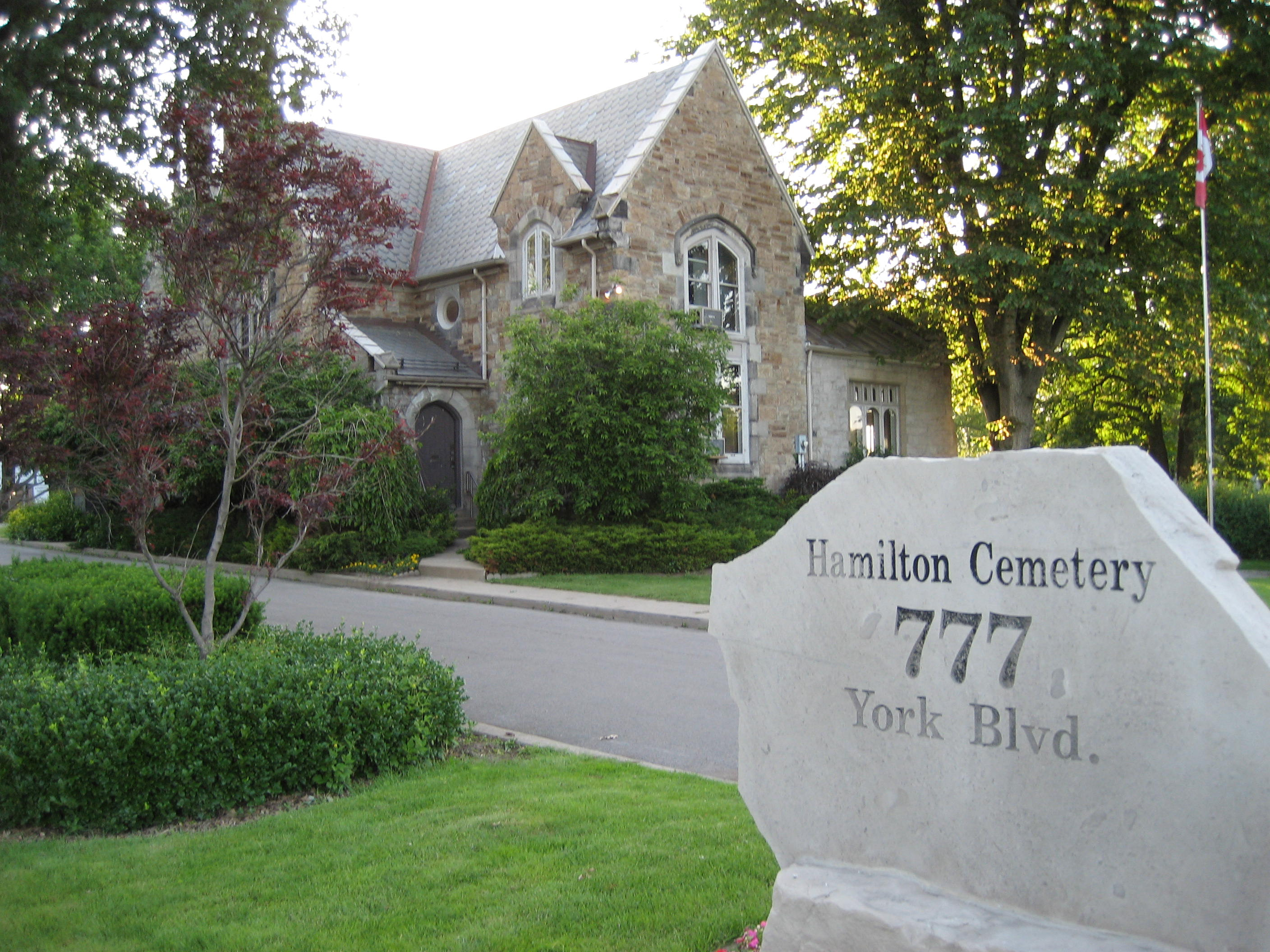
Hamilton Cemetery, York Boulevard Entrance

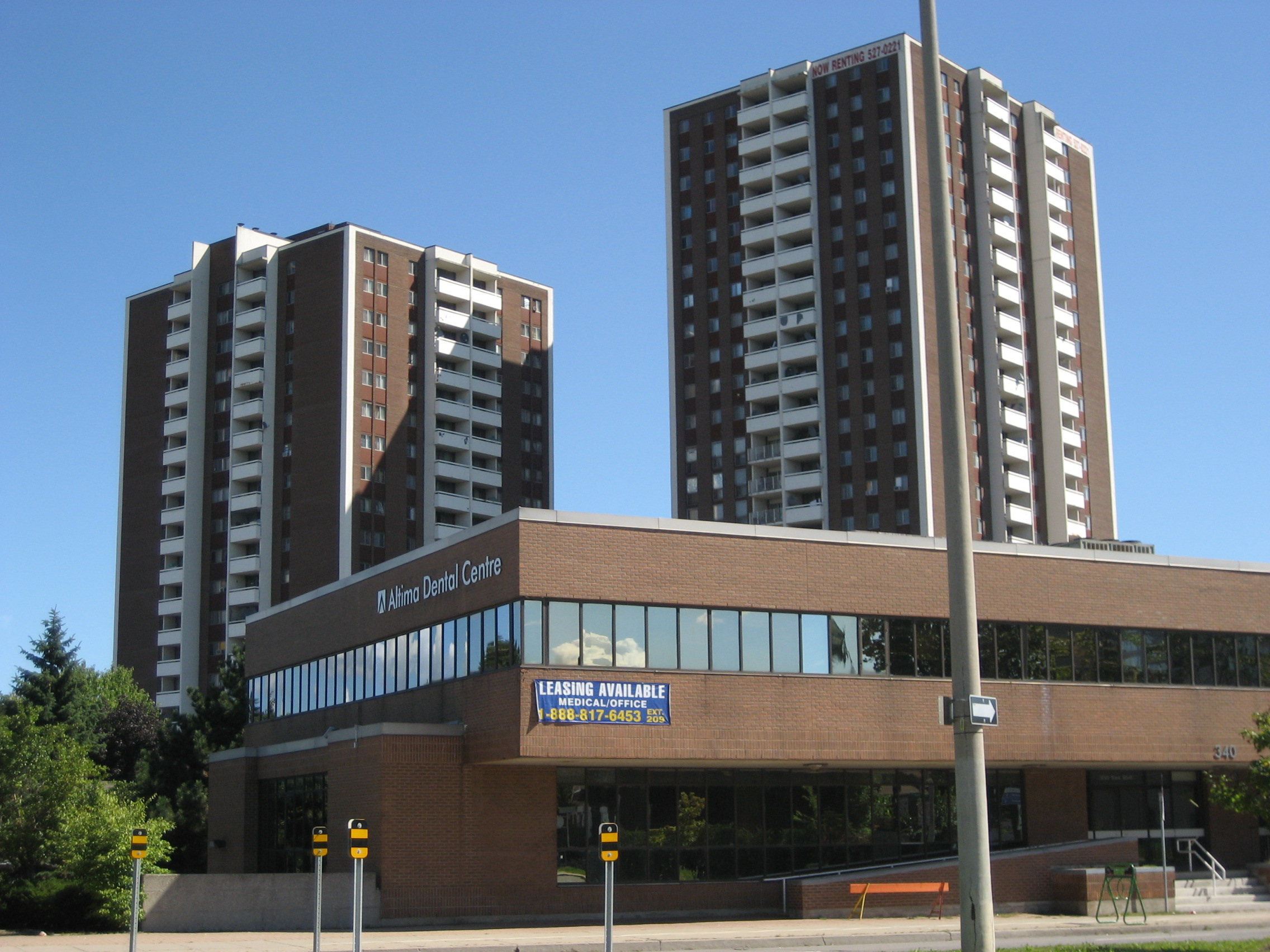
Altima Dental Centre

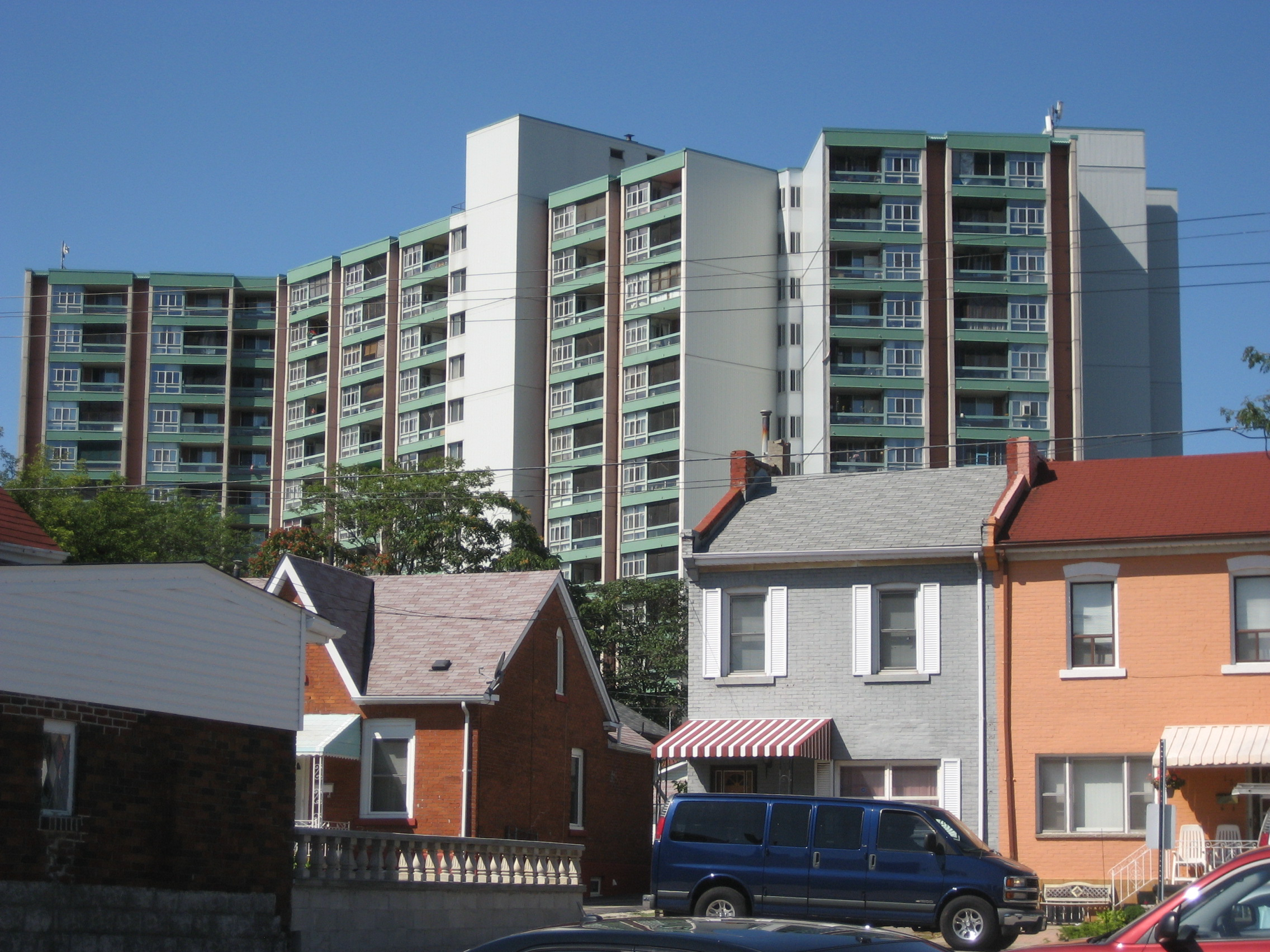
Strathcona Gardens Apartments

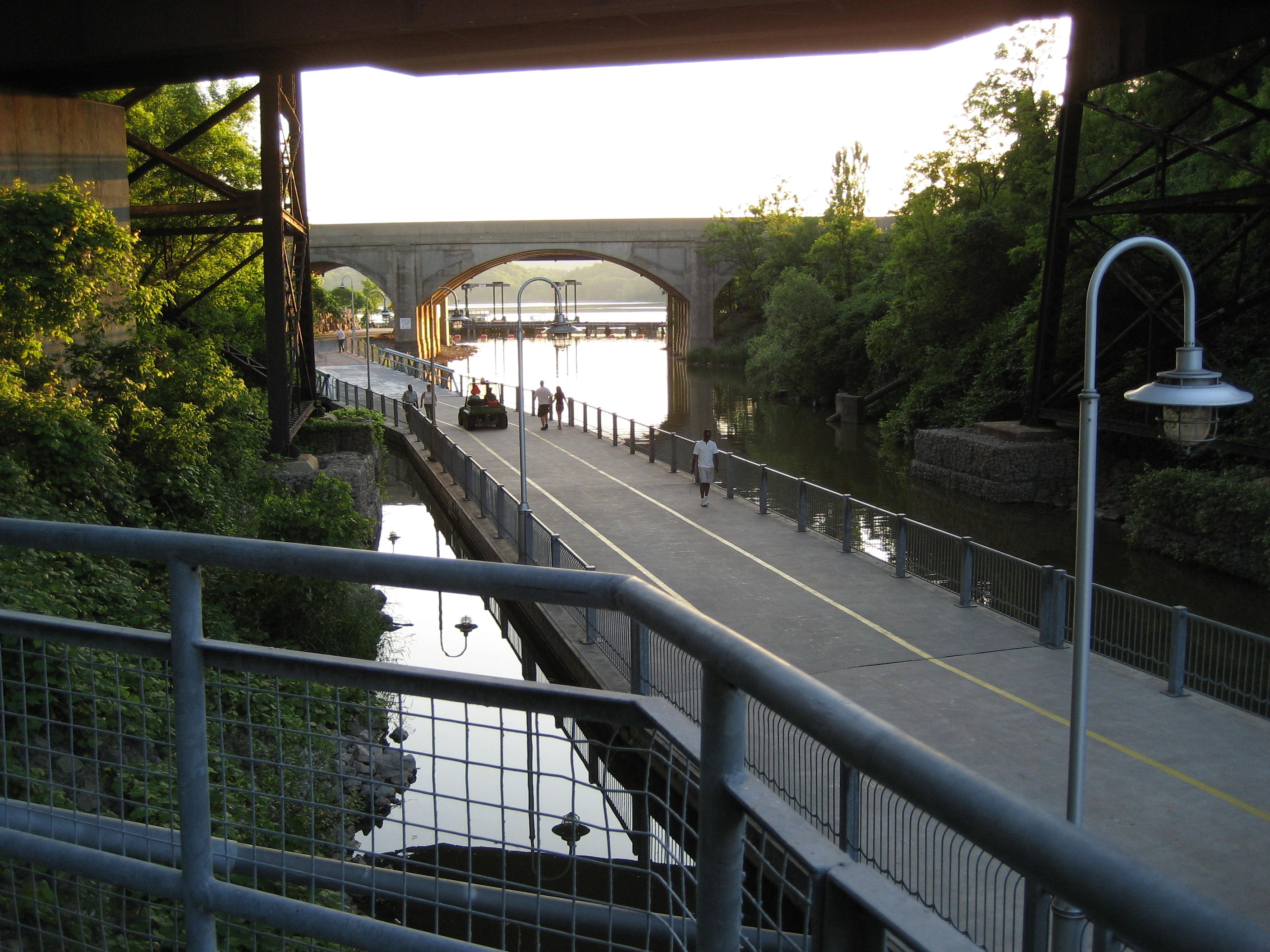
Waterfront Trolley route (seasonal)

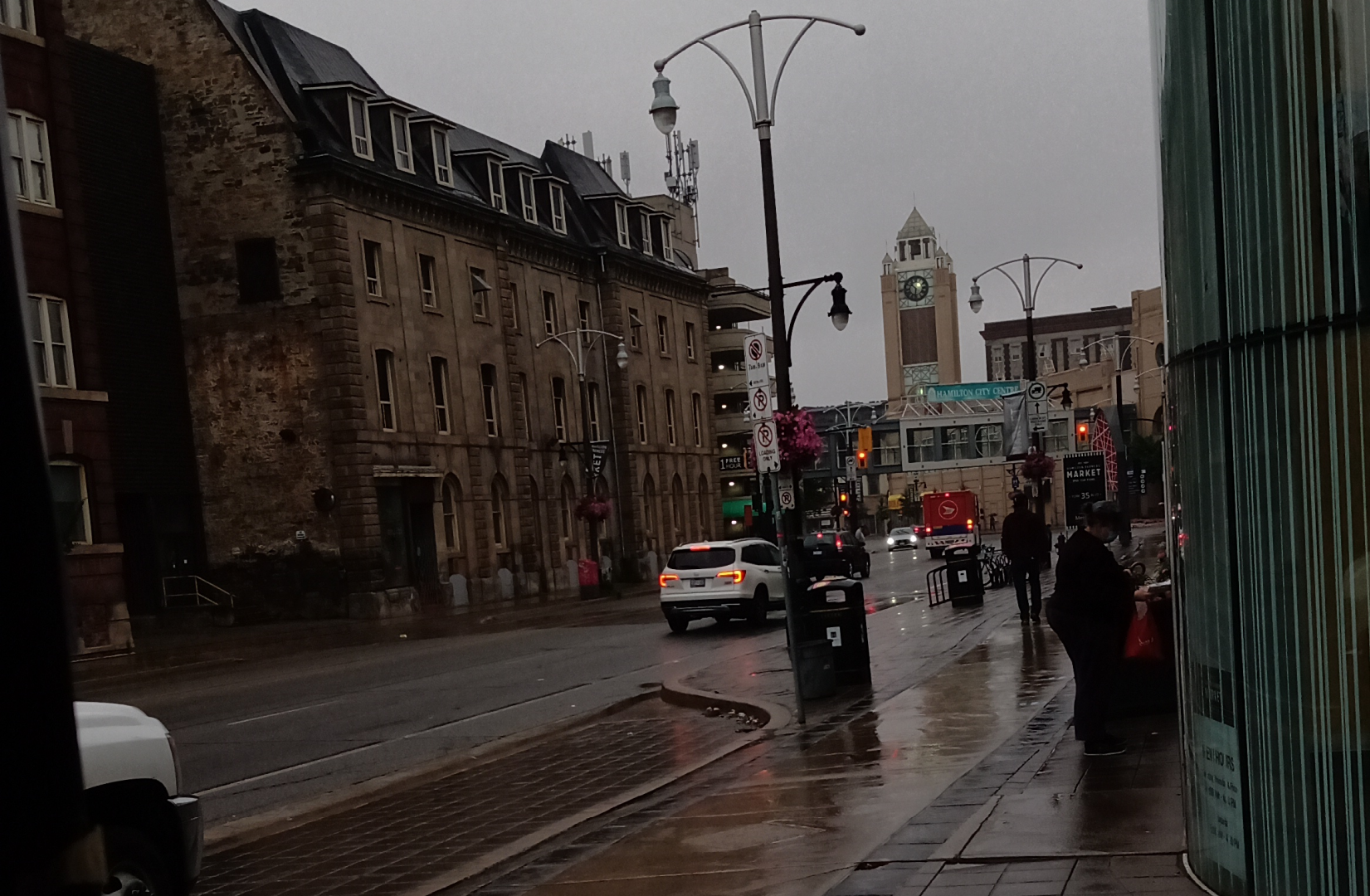
The end of York Boulevard downtown

== See also ==
- Botanic Gardens Conservation International
- James Street (Hamilton, Ontario)
- Locke Street (Hamilton, Ontario)
