= 1986 New York City Marathon =

Footrace held in New York City

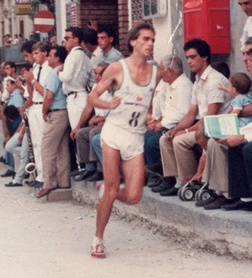
- Men's winner the Italian Gianni Poli.
- Date: 2 November
- Location: (United States) New York City, NY
- Event type: Marathon
- Distance: 42.195 km
- Edition: 17th
- Course records: 2:08:12 (1981 men); 2:25:29 (1981 women)
- Website: Official website

The 1986 New York City Marathon was the 17th edition of the New York City Marathon and took place in New York City on 2 November.

== Results ==
=== Men ===
- Antoni Niemczak of Poland finished 2nd but was later disqualified after a positive doping test.

Rank	Athlete	Country	Time
1st place, gold medalist(s)	Gianni Poli	Italy	2:11.06
2nd place, silver medalist(s)	Robert de Castella	Australia	2:11.43
3rd place, bronze medalist(s)	Orlando Pizzolato	Italy	2:12.13
4	Ibrahim Hussein	Kenya	2:12.51
5	Ralf Salzmann	West Germany	2:13.21
6	Salvatore Bettiol	Italy	2:13.27
7	Agapius Masong	Tanzania	2:13.59
8	Osvaldo Faustini	Italy	2:14.03
9	Pete Pfitzinger	United States	2:14.09
10	Eddy Hellebuyck	Belgium	2:14.30
11	James Ashworth	United Kingdom	2:15.20
12	Mehmet Terzi	Turkey	2:15.49
13	John Campbell	New Zealand	2:15.55
14	Honorato Hernández	Spain	2:16.03
15	Osmiro Da Silva	Brazil	2:16.24
16	Bill Reifsnyder	United States	2:16.31
17	Barry-David Smith	United Kingdom	2:16.33
18	Peter Butler	Canada	2:16.44
19	Gerard Nijboer	Netherlands	2:16.47
20	Randy Reina	United States	2:16.56
21	Alexandre Gonzalez	France	2:16.58
22	Malcolm East	United Kingdom	2:17.12
23	Gerhard Hartmann	Austria	2:17.27
24	Lindsay Robertson	United Kingdom	2:17.31
25	Tomislav Ašković	Yugoslavia	2:18.27

=== Women ===
Rank	Athlete	Country	Time
1st place, gold medalist(s)	Grete Waitz	Norway	2:28.06
2nd place, silver medalist(s)	Lisa Ondieki	Australia	2:29.12
3rd place, bronze medalist(s)	Laura Fogli	Italy	2:29.44
4	Jocelyne Villeton	France	2:32.51
5	Karolina Szabó	Hungary	2:34.51
6	Odette Lapierre	Canada	2:35.33
7	Emma Scaunich	Italy	2:37.50
8	Rita Marchisio	Italy	2:37.59
9	Christa Vahlensieck	West Germany	2:38.12
10	Sharlet Gilbert	United States	2:38.24
11	Gabriela Wolf	West Germany	2:38.46
12	Jeannette Nordgren	Sweden	2:38.49
13	Susan Stone	Canada	2:39.05
14	Leatrice Hayer	United States	2:39.35
15	Paola Moro	Italy	2:40.37
16	Antonella Bizioli	Italy	2:40.38
17	Wilma Rusman	Netherlands	2:40.42
18	Genoveva Eichenmann	Switzerland	2:40.46
19	Mary O'connor	New Zealand	2:41.00
20	Michele Bush	United States	2:41.36
21	Teresa Ornduff	United States	2:41.55
22	Gillian Horovitz	United Kingdom	2:46.32
23	Deborah Heath	United Kingdom	2:46.38
24	Anne Roden	United Kingdom	2:48.10
25	Marilyn Hulak	United States	2:49.52
