= 1985 Chicago Marathon =

Footrace held in Chicago, Illinois

9th Chicago Marathon
- Venue: Chicago, United States
- Dates: October 20

Champions
- Men: Steve Jones (2:07:13)
- Women: Joan Samuelson (2:21:21)

The 1985 Chicago Marathon was the ninth running of the annual marathon race in Chicago, United States and was held on October 20. The elite men's race was won by Britain's Steve Jones in a time of 2:07:13 hours and the women's race was won by America's Joan Samuelson in 2:21:21. A total of 7562 runners finished the race, an increase of over 1700 from the previous year.

== Results ==
=== Men ===
Position	Athlete	Nationality	Time
1st place, gold medalist(s)	Steve Jones	United Kingdom	2:07:13
2nd place, silver medalist(s)	Djama Robleh	Djibouti	2:08:08
3rd place, bronze medalist(s)	Robert de Castella	Australia	2:08:48
4	Gianni Poli	Italy	2:09:57
5	Ralf Salzmann	West Germany	2:10:56
6	José Gómez	Mexico	2:11:08
7	Don Janicki	United States	2:11:16
8	Francisco Pacheco	Mexico	2:11:57
9	Ken Martin	United States	2:12:00
10	Henrik Jørgensen	Denmark	2:12:03
11	Allister Hutton	United Kingdom	2:12:28
12	John Graham	United Kingdom	2:12:55
13	Mats Erixon	Sweden	2:13:29
14	Bill Donakowski	United States	2:14:07
15	David Olds	United States	2:14:19
16	Jean-Pierre Paumen	Belgium	2:14:25
17	Gianni Demadonna	Italy	2:14:30
18	Craig Holm	United States	2:14:43
19	Kurt Hürst	Switzerland	2:14:49
20	Agapius Masong	Tanzania	2:14:54
—	Mark Curp	United States	DNF
—	David Gordon	United States	DNF
—	Simon Kigen	Kenya	DNF
—	Martín Pitayo	Mexico	DNF

=== Women ===
Position	Athlete	Nationality	Time
1st place, gold medalist(s)	Joan Samuelson	United States	2:21:21
2nd place, silver medalist(s)	Ingrid Kristiansen	Norway	2:23:05
3rd place, bronze medalist(s)	Rosa Mota	Portugal	2:23:29
4	Carla Beurskens	Netherlands	2:27:50
5	Véronique Marot	United Kingdom	2:28:04
6	Glenys Quick	New Zealand	2:31:44
7	Mary O'Connor	New Zealand	2:33:41
8	Maria Rebelo	France	2:34:02
9	Sylvie Bornet	France	2:34:05
10	Rita Borralho	Portugal	2:36:03
11	Charlotte Teske	West Germany	2:36:42
12	María Trujillo	Mexico	2:37:10
13	Susan Stone	Canada	2:38:48
14	Gillian Castka	United Kingdom	2:38:53
15	Henrietta Fina	Austria	2:39:52
16	Sissel Grottenberg	Norway	2:43:52
17	Linda Somers	United States	2:46:29
18	Susan Bosch	United States	2:47:09
19	Joanne Scianna	United States	2:49:31
20	Jane Murphy	United States	2:50:04
