= 1985 Berlin Marathon =

Road running event in Berlin, West Germany

12th Berlin Marathon
- Venue: Berlin, West Germany
- Date: 29 September

Champions
- Men: James Ashworth (2:11:43)
- Women: Magda Ilands (2:34:10)
- Wheelchair men: Heinz Frei (1:57:28)
- Wheelchair women: Gabriele Schild (2:33:51)

The 1985 Berlin Marathon was the 12th running of the annual marathon race held in Berlin, West Germany, held on 29 September. Britain's James Ashworth won the men's race in 2:11:43 hours, while the women's race was won by Belgium Magda Ilands in 2:34:10. Switzerland's Heinz Frei (1:57:28) and Gabriele Schild (2:33:51), won the men's and women's wheelchair races. A total of 9810 runners finished the race, comprising 9146 men and 664 women.

== Results ==
=== Men ===
| Rank | Athlete | Nationality | Time |
|---|---|---|---|
| 1st place, gold medalist(s) | James Ashworth | United Kingdom | 2:11:43 |
| 2nd place, silver medalist(s) | Henrik Albahn | Denmark | 2:13:47 |
| 3rd place, bronze medalist(s) | Marc De Blander | Belgium | 2:13:59 |
| 4 | Gyula Borka | Hungary | 2:14:02 |
| 5 | Justin Gloden | Luxembourg | 2:14:28 |
| 6 | Zbigniew Pierzynka | Poland | 2:14:41 |
| 7 | Johan Skovbjerg | Denmark | 2:14:50 |
| 8 | Eleuterio Antón | Spain | 2:15:39 |
| 9 | Bogdan Śliwiński | Poland | 2:15:44 |
| 10 | Józef Ziubrak | Poland | 2:16:08 |
| 11 | Willem Zeegers | Netherlands | 2:16:35 |
| 12 | Lucien Rottiers | Belgium | 2:16:56 |
| 13 | Ian Beauchamp | United Kingdom | 2:17:22 |
| 14 | Ingo Sensburg | West Germany | 2:17:33 |
| 15 | Joseph Perske | United States | 2:17:52 |
| 16 | Gerard Helme | United Kingdom | 2:17:57 |
| 17 | Víctor Mora | Colombia | 2:18:12 |
| 18 | Niels Kim Hjorth | Denmark | 2:18:25 |
| 19 | Richard Umberg | Switzerland | 2:18:37 |
| 20 | Klaas Lok | Netherlands | 2:18:39 |

=== Women ===
| Rank | Athlete | Nationality | Time |
|---|---|---|---|
| 1st place, gold medalist(s) | Magda Ilands | Belgium | 2:34:10 |
| 2nd place, silver medalist(s) | Karen Holdsworth | United Kingdom | 2:35:18 |
| 3rd place, bronze medalist(s) | Ágnes Sipka | Hungary | 2:35:27 |
| 4 | Gabriela Wolf | West Germany | 2:36:04 |
| 5 | Gabriela Gorzynska | Poland | 2:38:13 |
| 6 | Heidi Jacobsen | Norway | 2:38:29 |
| 7 | Angelika Dunke | West Germany | 2:39:35 |
| 8 | Helene Eschler | Switzerland | 2:43:02 |
| 9 | Linda Delvaux | Luxembourg | 2:43:41 |
| 10 | Mette Holm | Denmark | 2:44:42 |
| 11 | Sylvia Kerambrum | United Kingdom | 2:45:03 |
| 12 | Lorna Irving | United Kingdom | 2:45:34 |
| 13 | Celia Duncan | United Kingdom | 2:46:00 |
| 14 | Helle Dossing | Denmark | 2:46:39 |
| 15 | Sonja Ambrosy | West Germany | 2:47:19 |
| 16 | Helena Koziorynska | Poland | 2:49:47 |
| 17 | Regina Schulz | West Germany | 2:50:12 |
| 18 | Annemarie Grüner | West Germany | 2:50:33 |
| 19 | Vibeke Nielsen | Denmark | 2:50:42 |
| 20 | Daniela Staudenmann | Switzerland | 2:50:53 |

=== Wheelchair men ===
| Rank | Athlete | Nationality | Time |
|---|---|---|---|
| 1st place, gold medalist(s) | Heinz Frei | Switzerland | 1:57:28 |
| 2nd place, silver medalist(s) | Erwin Zemp | Switzerland | 1:57:29 |
| 3rd place, bronze medalist(s) | Jean-Marc Berset | France | 2:03:51 |
| 4 | Hubert Foppe | West Germany | 2:10:29 |
| 5 | Hans Korte | West Germany | 2:10:30 |
| 6 | Frank Löhr | West Germany | 2:10:50 |
| 7 | Errol Merklein | West Germany | 2:14:58 |
| 8 | Terje Roel | Norway | 2:20:17 |
| 9 | Hans Albert Werkmann | West Germany | 2:20:38 |
| 10 | Urs Schild | Switzerland | 2:21:58 |

=== Wheelchair women ===
| Rank | Athlete | Nationality | Time |
|---|---|---|---|
| 1st place, gold medalist(s) | Gabriele Schild | Switzerland | 2:33:51 |
| 2nd place, silver medalist(s) | Margit Quell | West Germany | 2:42:21 |
| 3rd place, bronze medalist(s) | Waltraud Hagenlocher | West Germany | 2:56:45 |
| 4 | Birgit Frank | West Germany | 2:58:56 |
| 5 | Roswitha Wotte | West Germany | 3:03:43 |
| 6 | Elly Kleiner | West Germany | 3:12:13 |
