= James Ashworth (runner) =

British marathon runner

Personal information
- Nickname: Jimmy
- Born: 8 April 1957 (age 69) Bradford, England
- Occupation: Dustbin Man/Endurance Coach

Sport
- Sport: Athletics
- Club: Bingley Harriers
Medal record
Representing Great Britain
Marathon
Major Marathons
Silver medal – second place	1983 Berlin	Marathon
Gold medal – first place	1985 Berlin	Marathon

James Ashworth (born 8 April 1957) is a British former marathon runner, who won the 1985 Berlin Marathon, and came second at the 1983 Berlin Marathon. He also won the 1985 Miami Marathon.

== Career ==
Ashworth competed for Bingley Harriers. In 1983, Ashworth won the Piccadilly Marathon in Manchester, England. Later in the year, he came second at the 1983 Berlin Marathon, 24 seconds behind Karel Lismont. It has his personal best time. He finished second at the 1984 Miami Marathon behind Sweden's Tommy Persson. Ashworth had been leading until 5 miles (8.0 km) to go in the race, when he was overtaken by Persson. His finishing time was five seconds slower than in Berlin the previous year. He came seventh at the 1984 London Marathon, and 24th at the 1984 New York City Marathon.

Ashworth won the 1985 Miami Marathon in a time of 02:18:50. American Barry Brown had been leading the race for the first 20 miles (32 km), before Ashworth overtook him, as Brown was suffering with a leg injury. Ashworth had spent most of the race in the leading pack behind Brown, and gradually caught up to him. Ashworth himself was running with a knee injury sustained two months before the race. Later in the year, he won the 1985 Berlin Marathon, in a time of 02:11:43. He finished more than two minutes ahead of Henrik Albahn, who finished the race in second.

In 1986, Ashworth chose not to race the Miami Marathon, and competed in a 10 kilometres (6.2 mi) race in the city instead. He attempted to qualify for the marathon event at the 1986 Commonwealth Games. Later in the year, he came 12th at the 1986 New York City Marathon; he was the highest finishing Briton at the race.

== Personal life ==
Ashworth is from Bradford, Yorkshire, England. As of 1985, he was married and had two children. Aside from running, he worked as a dustbin man.
