= Around the Bay Road Race =

North America's oldest long distance road race

- Date: Last Sunday in March (Note: The 2026 race was pushed back to April 12 to avoid conflicting with the Juno Awards of 2026 and Easter.)
- Location: Hamilton, Ontario, Canada
- Event type: Road
- Distance: 30K, (Note: The 2024 race featured a modified 35.4km race route due to renovations at TD Coliseum and a sinkhole that opened along the originally planned route.) 5K, 10K, 15K
- Primary sponsor: CN
- Beneficiary: St. Joseph's Healthcare Foundation
- Established: 1894; 132 years ago
- Course records: Men (1:32:22) Alene Reta; Women (1:44:40) Lanni Marchant
- Website: bayrace.com

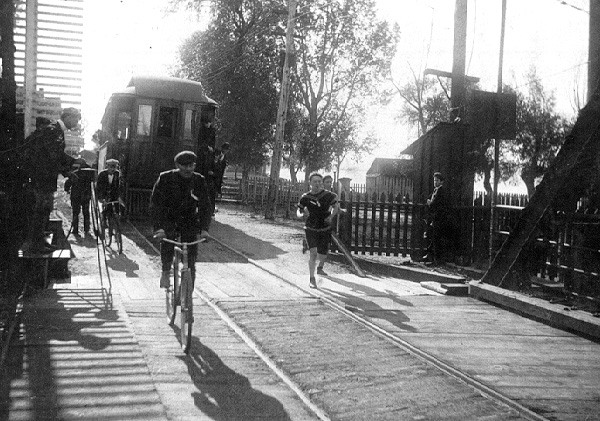
Winner Jim Duffy (1912) on the bridge over Burlington Canal.

The Around the Bay Road Race (ATB) is a long distance road race annually in Hamilton, Ontario. The event features a 30 kilometer race, a 5 kilometer race, a 10 kilometer race, a 15 kilometer race, and virtual races. First held in 1894, it is the oldest long distance road race in North America.

Since it began, the race has been held every year except for 1917 to 1919 (due to World War I), 1925 to 1935, 1962 (due to construction), and 2020 and 2021 (due to the COVID-19 pandemic).

== History ==
The Hamilton Herald Newspaper and cigar store owner "Billy" Carroll, originated and sponsored the "Herald Road Race", the first Around the Bay Road Race, run on Christmas Day, 1894. Thirteen racers ran the 19 mile and 168 yard course around Hamilton Harbour. Billy Marshall won the race and was awarded a $25 silver cup and some boxes of cigars.

In the early 20th century, Jack Caffery and William Sherring battled it out and won two "Bay" races each. Famed Canadian-Onondaga runner Tom Longboat also took the first major victory of his career here, in 1906.

Scotty Rankine won a record seven races in the 1930s and 1940s, while Peter Maher won his fifth Bay race in 1996, tying the record of local Gord Dickson, who had five wins in the late 1950s.

In 1967, Army, Navy and Air Force Veterans in Canada (ANAVIC) renamed its junior version of the annual Billy Sherring Around the Bay Road Race, to "The Ivan Miller Memorial", in recognition of journalist Ivan Miller's years of promoting the race.

Women were first allowed to enter in 1979.

In 2005, the ATB partnered with St. Joseph's Healthcare Foundation and, for the first time, became a fundraising event.

=== Recent history ===
==== 2020 ====
In February 2020, race organizers announced that the 30k race route would change to exclude the signature trek up the Valley Inn Road hill after the city of Hamilton closed the road's pedestrian bridge due to safety concerns. This ultimately didn't matter as, on March 13, the race was cancelled due to the rapidly progressing COVID-19 pandemic.

==== 2021 ====
In 2021, the ATB held a virtual race in lieu of the regular in-person event due to the continuing COVID-19 pandemic. In addition to ATB's 5k and 30k race distance, the virtual race included 2k, 10k, and 15k race distances as well as The Hammer challenge that honoured runners who completed all five race distances.

==== 2022 ====
The ATB returned to in-person racing in 2022 following two years of COVID-19 related restrictions. The 30k race featured 3,362 participants and the 5k race 777 participants. The race raised $275,000 for the St. Joseph's Healthcare Foundation.

Construction work on the Valley Inn Road bridge was completed less than a month before race day, allowing for the road's iconic Heartbreak Hill to be included in the 30k race route.

==== 2023 ====
The Burlington Canal Lift Bridge, historically the ATB's 15-kilometre mark, was closed on January 5 for major maintenance and scheduled to reopen on March 20, less than a week before race day. The bridge did reopen on March 20 as scheduled, allowing the race to proceed.

Race day was March 26 with more than six thousand participants. The men's 5k race had an unusual finish as several leading runners took a wrong turn onto Queen Street, missing out on their chance to win the race.

==== 2024 ====
Due to upcoming major renovations to FirstOntario Centre, race organizers announced that the start and finish for the 2024 race would move from FirstOntario Centre to Tim Hortons Field. The move was later confirmed after the FirstOntario Centre renovations were later rescheduled to begin after race day. The change in venue required changes to be made to the race routes, resulting in the 30k race being extended to a 34k race. This modified route was later changed just days before the race when a sinkhole unexpectedly opened on Burlington's North Shore Boulevard, resulting in a final race distance to 35.4k. The event also featured 5k, 10k, 15k, and virtual races.

== Race ==
For years, races started on York Boulevard, one block west of the TD Coliseum, and finished inside the arena. Due to upcoming major renovations to TD Coliseum, the start and finish for the 2024 race moved to Tim Hortons Field.

The 30 kilometre race is also known as the Billy Sherring Memorial Road Race. It is also called the 30K Around The Bay. On March 29, 2007, over 9,000 participants crossed the finish line.

== Winners ==
Key: Course record

=== 30k ===
Year	Men's winner	Time (h:m:s)	Women's winner	Time (h:m:s)	Rf.
2025	Phil Parrot-Migas (CAN)	1:37:30	Rachel Hannah (CAN)	1:47:36	
2024	Phil Parrot-Migas (CAN)	1:51:13	Rachel Hannah (CAN)	2:10:57	
2023	Blair Morgan (CAN)	1:37:46	Sasha Gollish (CAN)	1:48:03	
2022	Kevin Coffey (CAN)	1:40:10	Victoria Coates (CAN)	1:50:01	
2021	Ahmed Jouar (CAN)	1:50:06	Kathleen Lawrence (CAN)	2:02:48	
2020	Canceled due to the COVID-19 pandemic.				
2019	Daniel Kemoi (KEN)	1:32:57	Mengistu Emebet (ETH)	1:45:56	
2018	Haron Kiptoo Sirma (KEN)	1:35:11	Dayna Pidhoresky (CAN)	1:49:39	
2017	Panuel Mkungo (KEN)	1:34:51	Dayna Pidhoresky (CAN)	1:47:27	
2016	Paul Kimugal (KEN)	1:35:17	Risper Gesabwa (KEN)	1:47:38	
2015	Paul Kimugal (KEN)	1:33:48	Dayna Pidhoresky (CAN)	1:50:47	
2014	Paul Kimugal (KEN)	1:35:35	Krista DuChene (CAN)	1:47:14	
2013	Terence Attema (CAN)	1:35:45	Lanni Marchant (CAN)	1:44:40	
2012	Reid Coolsaet (CAN)	1:33:21	Krista DuChene (CAN)	1:47:04	
2011	Derek Nakluski (CAN)	1:37:15	Dayna Pidhoresky (CAN)	1:50:45	
2010	Alene Reta (ETH)	1:32:22	Lucy Njeri Muhami (KEN)	1:48:59	
2009	Thomas Omwenga (KEN)	1:35:29	Lucy Ngeri (KEN)	1:50:26	
2008	Alene Reta (ETH)	1:33:06	Lucy Ngeri (KEN)	1:48:28	
2007	Simon Njorge (KEN)	1:32:50	Magdelene Makunzi (KEN)	1:46:51	
2006	Nourddine Betchim	1:37:38	Kate MacNamara (CAN)	1:55:10	
2005	Joseph Ndritu (KEN)	1:38:46	Kate MacNamara (CAN)	1:58:06	
2004	Mustapha Bennacer	1:33:28	Lioudmila Kortchaguina (RUS)	1:46:04	
2003	Joseph Nsengiyumva	1:35:02	Lioudmila Kortchaguina (RUS)	1:52:50	
2002	Joseph Ndritu (KEN)	1:33:13	Lioudmila Kortchaguina (RUS)	1:46:18	
2001	Joseph Ndritu (KEN)	1:36:39	Elizabeth Ruel (CAN)	1:54:20	
2000	Joseph Ndritu (KEN)	1:32:53	Veronique Vandersmissen (CAN)	1:52:33	
1999	Paul Aufdemberge	1:36:31	May Allison	1:52:37	
1998	Sean Wade	1:34:43	Danuta Bartoszek	1:53:52	
1997	Paul Mbugua	1:35:35	Katie Dosser	1:56:22	
1996	Peter Maher	1:35:41	Cindy New	1:53:42	
1995	Mike McGowan	1:36:09	Kim Webb	1:49:17	
1994	Sammy Nyangincha	1:32:55	May Allison	1:50:54	
1993	Dave O’Keefe	1:38:22	Lizanne Bussieres	1:47:03	
1992	Clive Hamilton	1:40:26	Veronique Marot	1:54:42	
1991	Peter Maher	1:33:00	Veronique Marot	1:48:52	
1990	Peter Maher	1:35:54	Laura Konantz	1:54:16	
1989	Peter Maher	1:34:12	Dorothy Goertzen	1:58:53	
1988	Paul Waldie	1:39:21	Laura Konantz	1:58:40	
1987	Peter Maher	1:34:02	Susan Stone	1:51:37	
1986	Bob Slipp	1:39:53	Jennifer Ditchfield	1:55:03	
1985	Roger Martindill	1:34:22	Susan Stone	1:53:23	
1984	Roger Martindill	1:33:53	Anne-Marie Malone	1:46:29	
1983	Mike Dyon	1:34:15	Dorothy Goertzen	1:53:45	
1982	Dave Edge	1:34:50	Christine Keaney	2:02:02	

The 30 kilometre course was certified in 1982. Prior to then, the race was contested over a few different distances.

=== 5k ===
Year	Men's winner	Time (m:s)	Women's winner	Time (m:s)	Rf.
2025	Austin McGoey (CAN)	15:29	Emma Elliot (CAN)	17:27	
2024	Hunter Andrin (CAN)	15:06	Hannah Goodjohn (CAN)	16:01	
2023	Aaron De Jong (CAN)	15:56	Brittany Moran (CAN)	17:33	
2022	Dylan Pust (CAN)	15:57	Seanna Robinson (CAN)	19:00	
2021	Jon Gray (CAN)	17:01	Kathleen Lawrence (CAN)	18:11	
2020	Canceled due to the COVID-19 pandemic.				
2019	Alex Drover (CAN)	15:10	Gladys Tarus (CAN)	17:38	
2018	Ross Proudfoot (CAN)	14:37	Gladys Tarus (CAN)	17:47	
2017	Ross Proudfoot (CAN)	14:44	Kate Van Buskirk (CAN)	16:14	
2016	Joshua Bolton (CAN)	15:04	Victoria Coates (CAN)	17:08	
2015	Alex Genest (CAN)	14:35.2	Genevieve Lalonde (CAN)	16:25.9	
2014	Peter Corrigan (CAN)	14:29.5	Kate Van Buskirk (CAN)	16:18.7	
2013	Peter Corrigan (CAN)	14:41.5	Chantelle Groenewoud (CAN)	17:02.9	
2012	Alexander Hinton (CAN)	14:50.4	Chantelle Groenewoud (CAN)	16:45.0	
2011	Taylor Milne (CAN)	14:26.4	Lydia Willemse (CAN)	16:58.6	
2010	Taylor Milne (CAN)	14:10.9	Megan Brown (CAN)	16:46.1	
2009	Rob Watson (CAN)	14:16.6	Lanni Marchant (CAN)	17:19.8	
2008	Rob Watson (CAN)	14:12.9	Tara Johnson (CAN)	18:48.4	
2007	Andrew Smith (CAN)	14:32.8	Megan Brown (CAN)	16:34.1	
2006	Eric Morrison (CAN)	15:17.1	Shari Boyle-Hopkins (CAN)	18:13.9	
2005	Zeljko Sabol (CAN)	15:36.3	Megan Brown (CAN)	17:50.4	
2004	Calvin Staples (CAN)	14:50.3	Diane Nukuri (CAN)	17:00.1	
2003	Henry Githuka (KEN)	14:31	Nicole Stevenson (CAN)	16:41	
2002	Joseph Nsengiyumva (CAN)	14:40	Krestena Sullivan (CAN)	17:12	
2001	Stephane Gamache (CAN)	15:19	Tambra Dunn (CAN)	17:01	
2000	Guy Schultz (CAN)	15:15	Kim Webb (CAN)	16:59	
1999	Guy Schultz (CAN)	14:50	Danuta Bartosek (CAN)	16:33	
1998	Dave Lorne (CAN)	15:13	Natalie Cote (CAN)	16:48	
1997	Dave Lorne (CAN)	14:49	Andrea Johnson (CAN)	17:10	
1996	Rich Tremain (CAN)	14:34	Paula Schnurr (CAN)	16:01	
1995	Fraser Bertram (CAN)	14:40	Liz Jones (CAN)	16:50	
1994	Richard Charette (CAN)	14:24	Elizabeth Jones (CAN)	16:34	
1993	Greg Jackson (CAN)	15:42	Missy McCleary (CAN)	17:39	

== Top fundraisers ==
Top fundraisers of the event since 2005.
Year	Participant	Funds raised
2008	Ted Michaels/ Connie Smith	$60,000
2007	Ron Foxcroft	$55,000
2006	Brian Mullan (Hamilton Police Chief)	$50,000
2005	Dave Andreychuk	$30,000
