= Hideki Kita =

Japanese long-distance runner

Medal record

Men's athletics

Representing Japan

Asian Championships
Gold medal – first place	1979 Tokyo	5000 m

Hideki Kita (喜多 秀喜, Kita Hideki; born September 28, 1952) is a retired male long-distance runner from Japan. His personal best at the marathon distance was 2:10:30 at the 1983 Fukuoka Marathon. He won the Beijing Marathon in 1984, and competed in the Boston Marathon in 1987 and 1988.

== Competition record ==
Year	Competition	Venue	Position	Event	Notes
Representing Japan
1978	Beppu-Ōita Marathon	Beppu/Ōita, Japan	5th	Marathon	2:15:02
1978	Fukuoka Marathon	Fukuoka, Japan	2nd	Marathon	2:11:05
1979	Beppu-Ōita Marathon	Beppu/Ōita, Japan	1st	Marathon	2:13:29
1979	Asian Championships	Tokyo, Japan	1st	5000 m	13:55.3
1980	Fukuoka Marathon	Fukuoka, Japan	15th	Marathon	2:14:37
1981	Tokyo Marathon	Tokyo, Japan	1st	Marathon	2:12:04
1981	Fukuoka Marathon	Fukuoka, Japan	14th	Marathon	2:14:32
1982	Tokyo Marathon	Tokyo, Japan	8th	Marathon	2:13:24
1982	Fukuoka Marathon	Fukuoka, Japan	2nd	Marathon	2:11:09
1983	World Championships	Helsinki, Finland	42nd	Marathon	2:21:37
1983	Fukuoka Marathon	Fukuoka, Japan	7th	Marathon	2:10:30
1984	Beijing Marathon	Beijing, China	1st	Marathon	2:12:16
1987	Boston Marathon	Boston, United States	9th	Marathon	2:15:23
1987	Beijing Marathon	Beijing, China	5th	Marathon	2:13:09
1988	Boston Marathon	Boston, United States	12th	Marathon	2:14:40
1988	Fukuoka Marathon	Fukuoka, Japan	5th	Marathon	2:11:51
1989	Rotterdam Marathon	Rotterdam, Netherlands	13th	Marathon	2:15:41
1989	Fukuoka Marathon	Fukuoka, Japan	14th	Marathon	2:17:28
1990	Rotterdam Marathon	Rotterdam, Netherlands	5th	Marathon	2:15:39
1990	Moscow Peace Marathon	Moscow, Russia	8th	Marathon	2:18:31
1990	Fukuoka Marathon	Fukuoka, Japan	8th	Marathon	2:15:36
1991	Hōfu Marathon	Hōfu, Japan	5th	Marathon	2:16:27

== See also ==
- List of 5000 metres national champions (men)
