= Gabriela Wolf =

German long-distance runner (born 1960)

Personal information
- Nationality: German
- Born: 28 October 1960 (age 65) Schwerte, West Germany
- Height: 1.69 m (5 ft 7 in)

Sport
- Sport: Long-distance running
- Event: Marathon
- Club: LAV Dortmund / LG Olympia Dortmund

Gabriela Petra Wolf (born 28 October 1960) is a German long-distance runner who specialized in the marathon race.

She finished 42nd at the 1987 World Women's Road Race Championships, 23rd at the 1987 World Championships marathon, 31st at the 1988 IAAF World Women's Road Race Championships, 27th at the 1988 Summer Olympic marathon and 41st at the 1992 World Half Marathon Championships.

She recorded top-4 placements, including victories, at the Frankfurt Marathon, Berlin Marathon (1985), Hamburg Marathon, Duisburg Marathon, Karlsruhe Marathon, Hannover Marathon and the Osaka International Ladies Marathon. She also finished 11th at the 1986 New York City Marathon and 9th at the 1992 Tokyo Marathon.
