= 1983 Berlin Marathon =

10th Berlin Marathon
- Venue: Berlin, West Germany
- Date: 25 September

Champions
- Men: Karel Lismont (2:13:37)
- Women: Karen Holdsworth (2:40:32)
- Wheelchair men: Gregor Golombek (2:16:32)
- Wheelchair women: Gabriele Beyer (Paralympian) (2:51:12)

The 1983 Berlin Marathon was the 10th running of the annual marathon race held in Berlin, West Germany, held on 25 September. Belgium's Karel Lismont won the men's race in 2:13:37 hours, while the women's race was won by Britain's Karen Holdsworth in 2:40:32. West Germany's Gregor Golombek (1:55:10) and Gabriele Beyer (Paralympian) (2:51:12), won the men's and women's wheelchair races. A total of 5121 runners finished the race, comprising 4886 men and 235 women.

== Results ==
=== Men ===
Rank	Athlete	Nationality	Time
1st place, gold medalist(s)	Karel Lismont	Belgium	2:13:37
2nd place, silver medalist(s)	James Ashworth	United Kingdom	2:14:01
3rd place, bronze medalist(s)	Werner Meier	Switzerland	2:15:06
4	Franz Homberger	Germany	2:15:27
5	Wiktor Sawicki	Poland	2:16:15
6	Jonathan Kilsby	United Kingdom	2:17:31
7	Paul Campbell	United Kingdom	2:18:52
8	Helmut Dreyer	West Germany	2:21:13
9	Clemens Hoube	West Germany	2:21:27
10	Istvan Denes	West Germany	2:21:31
11	Richard Umberg	Switzerland	2:21:55
12	Wojciech Ratkowski	Poland	2:22:08
13	Kazimierz Marczuk	Poland	2:22:10
14	Norbert Bollweg	West Germany	2:22:18
15	Rolf Barr	Sweden	2:22:40
16	John Barker	United Kingdom	2:22:50
17	Keith Brackstone	United Kingdom	2:22:56
18	Adrian Philpott	Ireland	2:23:10
19	Sam Lambourne	United Kingdom	2:23:27
20	Ulf Llunge	West Germany	2:23:41

=== Women ===
Rank	Athlete	Nationality	Time
1st place, gold medalist(s)	Karen Holdsworth	United Kingdom	2:40:32
2nd place, silver medalist(s)	Jean Lochhead	United Kingdom	2:43:56
3rd place, bronze medalist(s)	Renata Walendziak	Poland	2:44:07
4	Else Ulrich	Denmark	2:49:03
5	Helen Comsa	Switzerland	2:51:34
6	Angelika Brandt	West Germany	2:52:14
7	Jutta von Haase	West Germany	2:53:43
8	Ulla Meyer	West Germany	2:54:12
9	Mathilde Heuing	West Germany	2:54:31
10	Anna Krol	Poland	2:56:30
11	Eroica Staudenmann	Switzerland	2:57:19
12	Françoise Nicolas	France	2:58:09
