= Priscilla Welch =

British marathon runner (born 1944)

Personal information
- Nationality: British (English)
- Born: 22 November 1944 (age 81) Bedford, England
- Height: 165 cm (5 ft 5 in)
- Weight: 50 kg (110 lb)

Sport
- Sport: Athletics
- Event: long distance
- Club: Nuneaton Harriers

Priscilla June Welch, née Mayes (born 22 November 1944) is a British retired marathon runner. She twice broke the British record for the marathon, with 2:28:54 when finishing sixth at the 1984 Los Angeles Olympics and 2:26:51 when finishing second at the 1987 London Marathon. The latter time stood as the W40 World Masters record for over 20 years. She also won the 1987 New York City Marathon.

== Biography ==
Born in Bedford, England, as Priscilla Mayes, she had a most unlikely career in international athletics, having been a smoker of a pack a day until she began running competitively at age 35. An officer in the British Army, Welch met her husband Dave while serving in Norway. She quit smoking, and under his tutelage, she ran in the 1981 London Marathon at age 36, running 2:59:00.

Welch won the Glasgow Marathon in 1981 (2:55:15) and 1982 (2:46:58), before twice improving her best in 1983 with 2:39:29 for 10th in London and 2:36:32 when winning the Enschede Marathon. She moved to second on the British all-time list (behind Joyce Smith's 2:29:43) when running 2:30:06 at the 1984 London Marathon, qualifying for the British team for the 1984 Los Angeles Olympics. The same year Welch also became the British 10,000 metres champion and marathon national champion after winning the British WAAA Championships titles at the 1984 WAAA Championships.

In the first women's Olympic marathon (1984), aged 39, she finished sixth, setting a new British record with 2:28:54. Two months after the Olympics, she won the Columbus Marathon in 2:34:04. After the British record was improved by Sarah Rowell (2:28:06) and Veronique Marot (2:28:04), Welch regained the record with 2:26:51 when finishing second at the London Marathon in April 1987. This time was also an age group (W40) world record, and ranked her as the sixth fastest in the world for 1987. This stood as the W40 age group world record until 2008 when Ludmila Petrova ran 2:25:43. In November 1987, Welch won the New York City Marathon running 2:30:17.

The 1988 British Olympic trial race was the London Marathon on 17 April. Welch instead chose to run the Boston Marathon the following day. There she set the Boston W40 age group record by running a 2:30:48. This record stood until 2002 when Firiya Sultanova ran 2:27:58. With the first two British finishers in London (Ann Ford and Susan Tooby) assured Olympic selection, there was only one remaining Olympic place. Welch, whose Boston time was almost a minute faster than Ford's in London, was initially overlooked in favour of Veronique Marot, who had withdrawn shortly before London due to injury. Marot was given the third Olympic spot, providing she could prove her fitness, but days later, it was announced that there had been a mix-up and Welch, not Marot, was selected for the Seoul Olympics. Months later she withdrew because of injury.

A 1992 bout with breast cancer curtailed Welch's marathon career. Her last marathon was the 1991 Los Angeles Marathon, where she finished 11th in 2:40:20. In October 1999, aged 54, she ran 63:58 at the Tulsa 15 km road race. She later moved to Bend, Oregon, with family living in Northampton, England.

== Achievements ==
- All results regarding marathon, unless stated otherwise

Year	Competition	Venue	Position	Notes
Representing Great Britain
1981	London Marathon	London, United Kingdom	18th	2:59:00
1981	Aberdeen Marathon	Aberdeen, United Kingdom	2nd	3:08:55
1981	Glasgow Marathon	Glasgow, United Kingdom	1st	2:55:15
1982	London Marathon	London, United Kingdom	21st	2:53:36
1982	Scottish Championships	Grangemouth, United Kingdom	3rd	2:55:59
1982	Bolton Marathon	Bolton, United Kingdom	2nd	2:56:19
1982	Aberdeen Marathon	Abedeen, United Kingdom	3rd	2:55:59
1982	Glasgow Marathon	Glasgow, United Kingdom	1st	2:46:58
1983	London Marathon	London, United Kingdom	10th	2:39:29
1983	Enschede Marathon	Enschede, Netherlands	1st	2:36:32
1984	London Marathon	London, United Kingdom	2nd	2:30:06
1984	Olympic Games	Los Angeles, United States	6th	2:28:54
1984	Columbus Marathon	Columbus, United States	1st	2:34:04
1985	Pittsburgh Marathon	Pittsburgh, United States	4th	2.34.35
1985	Columbus Marathon	Columbus, United States	4th	2.38.06
1985	New York Marathon	New York, United States	5th	2.35.30
1986	Nagoya International Women's Marathon	Nagoya, Japan	DNF	—
1986	Pittsburgh Marathon	Pittsburgh, United States	3rd	2:41:25
1986	Chicago Marathon	Chicago, United States	3rd	2:31:14
1987	Nagoya International Women's Marathon	Nagoya, Japan	6th	2:38:51
1987	London Marathon	London, United Kingdom	2nd	2:26:51
1987	New York City Marathon	New York, United States	1st	2:30:17
1988	Boston Marathon	Boston, United States	4th	2.30.53
1988	Honolulu Marathon	Honolulu, United States	2nd	2:43:20
1989	New York City Marathon	New York, United States	12th	2:36:15
1991	Los Angeles Marathon	Los Angeles, United States	11th	2:40:20
