= Karen Holdsworth =

British marathon runner

Personal information
- Born: 2 August 1960
- Died: 30 April 2013 (aged 52)

Sport
- Sport: Athletics
- Event: Marathon
Medal record
Marathon
World Marathon Majors
Representing Great Britain
Gold medal – first place	1983 Berlin	Marathon

Karen Holdsworth (née Moody, also Goldhawk, 2 August 1960 – 30 April 2013) was a British marathon runner, who won the 1983 Berlin Marathon.

== Career ==
Holdsworth was a member of South Shields athletics club. In 1981, Holdsworth won the inaugural Great North Run, finishing in a time of 1:17.36. In the same year, she finished sixth at the inaugural London Marathon, in a time of 2:43:28. In 1983, she won the Berlin Marathon in a time of 2:40:32. In the same year, she won the Paris Marathon. In 1984, she won the Reading and Fleet Half Marathons.

== Marathon competition record ==
Competition	Rank	Time	Location	Date
1981 London Marathon	6th	2:43:28	London	29 March 1981
1981 Great North Run	1st	1:17:36	South Shields	28 June 1981
1983 Paris Marathon	1st	2:51:08	Paris	14 May 1983
1983 Berlin Marathon	1st	2:40:32	Berlin	25 September 1983
1984 Reading Half Marathon	1st	1:13:56	Reading	25 March 1984
1984 London Marathon	13th	2:42:51	London	13 May 1984
1985 Berlin Marathon	2nd	2:35:18	Berlin	29 September 1985
