= Billy Sherring =

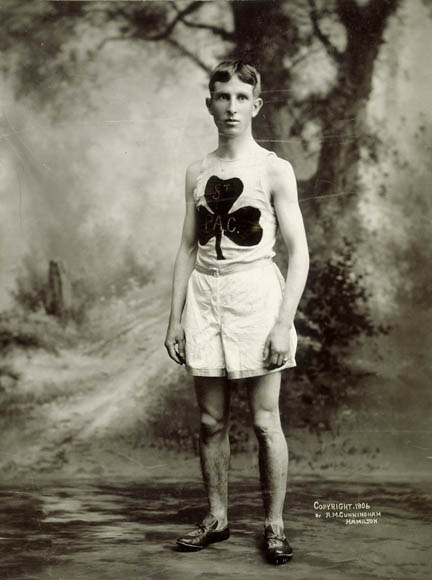
- William Sherring

Personal information
- Born: William John Sherring; September 18, 1877 Hamilton, Ontario, Canada
- Died: September 5, 1964 (aged 86) Hamilton, Ontario, Canada
- Height: 5 ft 5 in (1.65 m)
- Weight: 119 lb (54 kg)

Sport
- Sport: Marathon
- Retired: 1906

Achievements and titles
- Olympic finals: 1906 Summer Olympics: Marathon – Gold
Medal record
Men's athletics
Representing Canada
Olympic Games
Gold medal – first place	1906 Athens	Marathon

William John Sherring (September 18, 1877 – September 5, 1964) was a Canadian athlete of English and Irish descent, winner of the marathon race at the 1906 Olympic Games (later called "Intercalated Games").

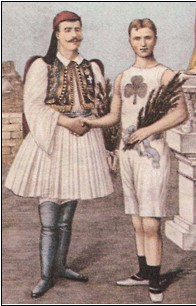
With Spyridon Louis, Athens, 1906

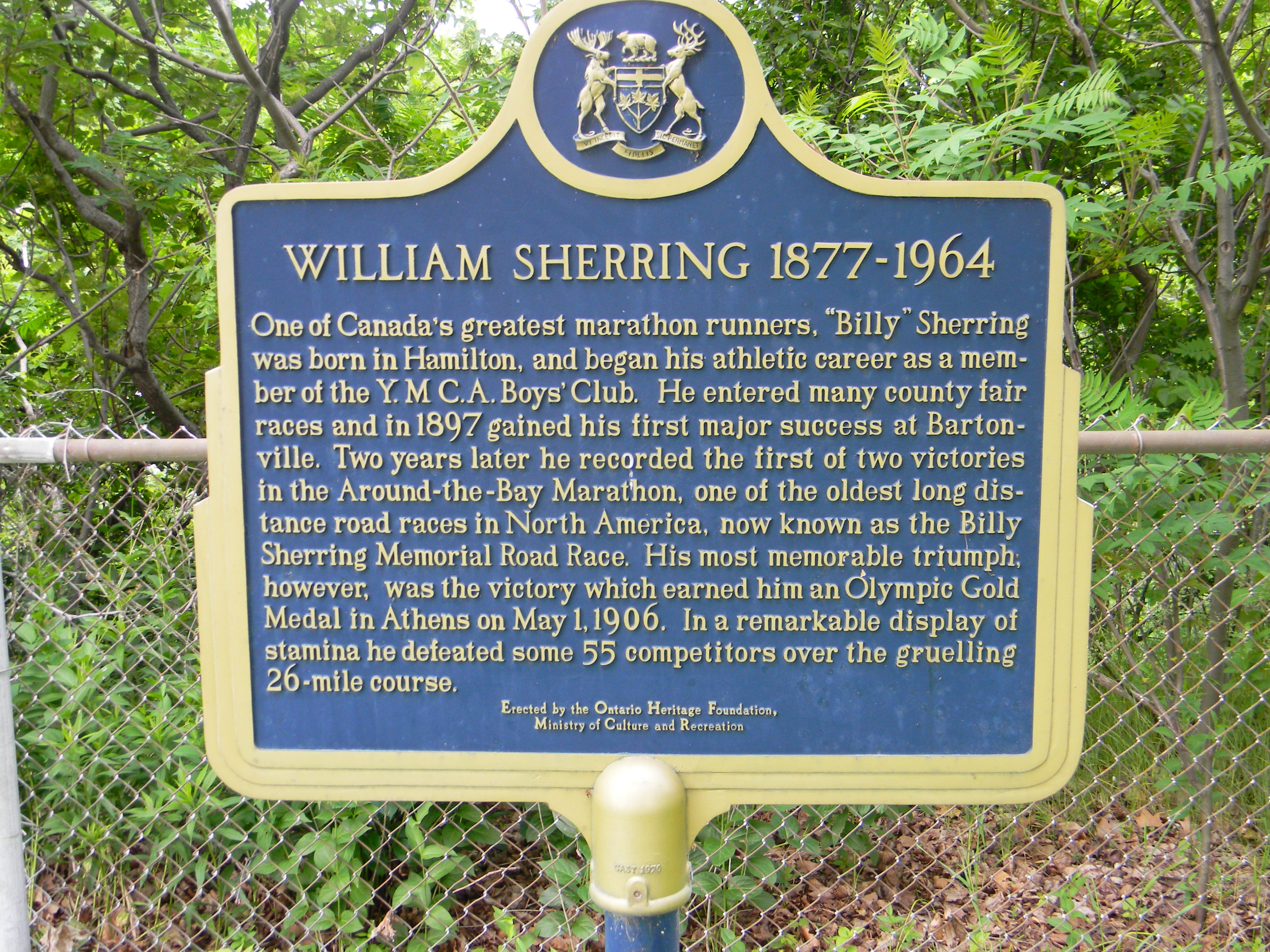
Plaque in Hamilton

During the decade of the early 1900s, Sherring, from Hamilton, Ontario was acknowledged to be a world class marathoner. He had won a second place behind a fellow countryman Jack Caffery at the Boston Marathon in 1900. He also had won the Hamilton Around the Bay Road Race on two occasions.

In 1906, Sherring – an athlete of St. Patrick's Athletic Club – was chosen to represent Canada in the Athens Olympic Games. However, it was left up to him, a working man with meager resources (he was a brakeman at the Grand Trunk Railway), to finance his journey to Athens. Sherring managed to collect an amount claimed to be between $45 and $90 (a clearly insufficient amount to travel to Athens), which he then bet on a horse named Cicely which won with good odds. He arrived in Athens seven weeks before the Olympic Games and started to work as a porter at the Athens railway station.

At the marathon race, the 45 kg (99 lb) Sherring proceeded at a steady pace, at one point a half-mile behind the leaders, before taking the lead at about the fifteen mile mark and finishing seven minutes before the next runner. Prince George of Greece ran the last 50 metres of the marathon alongside Sherring. Sherring received a live lamb and a statue of Athena as a reward. When he returned to Canada, Hamilton City Council awarded him $5000 and the City of Toronto awarded him a further $400. Baron Pierre de Coubertin wrote a letter to the Governor General of Canada, Albert Grey, protesting the gifts as inconsistent with the Olympic ideal of "sport for sport's sake." So far as is known, Sherring got to keep his money. The province of Ontario named two new townships in New Ontario (now part of Cochrane District) in honour of Sherring, Sherring twp and Marathon twp (not to be confused with Marathon, Ontario).

Upon his triumphant return from the marathon, Sherring quit athletics and worked as a customs officer in Hamilton until his retirement in 1942.

Sherring was inducted into the Canada's Sports Hall of Fame in 1955.

After his death, the Around the Bay Road Race was renamed the Billy Sherring Memorial Road Race, and Hamilton has since built a Billy Sherring Park to commemorate their most famous athlete.

Sherring is thought to have inspired the founders of Panathinaikos to adopt the shamrock as the Greek multi-sport club's official emblem in 1918.
