= Agapius Masong =

Tanzanian long-distance runner (born 1962)

Personal information
- Born: December 10, 1962 (age 63)

Sport
- Sport: Marathon running
Medal record
Representing Tanzania
Summer Universiade
Silver medal – second place	1983 Edmonton	10,000m

Agapius Masong Amo (born December 10, 1962) is a former long-distance runner from Tanzania, who represented his native country in the men's marathon at the 1984 Summer Olympics. There he finished in 21st position, clocking 2:16:25 minutes. He finished fifth at the 1983 World Championships. He won the Stockholm and Belgrade Marathons during his career.

== Achievements ==
Year	Competition	Venue	Position	Event	Notes
Representing Tanzania
1983	World Championships	Helsinki, Finland	5th	Marathon	2:10:42
1984	Stockholm Marathon	Stockholm, Sweden	1st	Marathon	2:13:47
1984	Olympic Games	Los Angeles, United States	21st	Marathon	2:16:25
1986	New York City Marathon	New York City, United States	7th	Marathon	2:13:59
1988	Bremen Marathon	Bremen, Germany	1st	Marathon	2:17:18
1989	Hamburg Marathon	Hamburg, Germany	4th	Marathon	2:16:02
1991	Belgrade Marathon	Belgrade, Yugoslavia	1st	Marathon	2:16:23
