= Ellen Rochefort =

Canadian long-distance runner

Personal information
- Born: 22 November 1954 (age 71) Lac-Saint-Jean, Quebec, Canada

Sport
- Sport: Long-distance running
- Event: Marathon

Ellen Rochefort (born 22 November 1954) is a Canadian long-distance runner. She competed in the women's marathon at the 1988 Summer Olympics.
