= Odette Lapierre =

Canadian marathon runner

Odette Lapierre (born January 28, 1955, in Charny, Quebec) is a Canadian former long-distance runner, who competed in the women's marathon at two consecutive Summer Olympics for her native country, starting in 1988. After having finished in 11th place (2:30:56) in Seoul, South Korea she ended up in 19th place (2:46.18), four years later in Barcelona, Spain.

== Achievements ==
Year	Competition	Venue	Position	Event	Notes
Representing Canada
1986	Commonwealth Games	Edinburgh, Scotland	3rd	Marathon	2:31:48
1986	New York City Marathon	New York City, United States	6th	Marathon	2:35:33
1987	World Championships	Rome, Italy	16th	Marathon	2:40:20
1988	Olympic Games	Seoul, South Korea	11th	Marathon	2:30:56
1990	Commonwealth Games	Auckland, New Zealand	8th	Marathon	2:41:36
1990	New York City Marathon	New York City, United States	12th	Marathon	2:38:48
1992	Olympic Games	Barcelona, Spain	19th	Marathon	2:46:18
